= List of Kannada films of 1969 =

== Top-grossing films ==
| Rank | Title | Collection | Ref. |
|---|---|---|---|
| 1. | Mayor Muthanna | ₹70 lakh (₹37.8 crore in 2025) | |
| 2. | Kappu Bilupu | ₹30 lakh (₹17.51 crore in 2025) | |

== List ==
The following is a list of films produced in the Kannada film industry in India in 1969, presented in alphabetical order.

| Title | Director | Cast | Music director | Producer |
|---|---|---|---|---|
| Ade Hrudaya Ade Mamate | M. N. Prasad | Udaya Kumar, Ramesh, Jayanthi | Upendra Kumar | D. Krishna Murthy |
| Bageerathi | T. V. Singh | Udaya Kumar, Jayanthi, Pandari Bai | G. K. Venkatesh | G. N. Viswanath |
| Bhale Basava | B. S. Ranga | Udaya Kumar, Rajesh, Jayanthi | S.Rajeswara Rao | B. S. Ranga |
| Bhale Raja | Y. R. Swamy | Rajkumar, Nagappa, Jayanthi | Satyam | Yajaman Moti |
| Broker Bheeshmachari | B. C.Srinivas | Rajesh, Shylashri, Jayanthi | Vasanth Kumar | M. S. Shivaraj |
| Brundaavana | S. P. Rajgopal | Kalpana, Leelavathi, M. V. Rajamma | Vijaya Bhaskar | Sri Nandi Films |
| Chaduranga | N. C. Rajan | Rajaashankar, Udaya Kumar, Bharathi | R. Ratna | Sakkamma |
| Chikkamma | R. Sampath | Rajkumar, Balakrishna, Jayanthi | T. V. Raju | M. Chandra Kumar |
| Choori Chikkanna | R. Ramamurthy | Rajkumar, K. S. Ashwath, Jayanthi | Satyam | R. Rama Murthy |
| Choukada Deepa | G. V. Iyer | Rajendra Kumar, Niranjan, Anantharam Maccheri | Upendra Kumar | Premier Studios |
| Eradu Mukha | M. R. Vittal | Rajesh, Jayanthi, K. S. Ashwath | Vijaya Bhaskar | B. V. Srinivas |
| Gandondu Hennaru | B. R. Panthulu | Rajkumar, Bharathi, Mynavathi | T. G. Lingappa | B. R. Panthulu |
| Gruhalakshmi | Vijaya Satyam | Ramesh, K. S. Ashwath, Jayanthi | M. Ranga Rao | T. P. Venugopal |
| Kadina Rahasya | Geethapriya | R. N. Sudarshan, Shylashri, K. S. Ashwath | Satyam | M. P. Shankar |
| Kaanike | Satyam | Jayashree, Kalpana, Shylashri | Satyam | A. G. Taylor |
| Kalpavruksha | Ku. Ra. Seetharam | Udaya Kumar, Leelavathi, Srinath | Jaidev | Manubhai Patel |
| Kannamucchale | M. R. Vittal | Kalyan Kumar, Vandana, Dwarakish | G. K. Venkatesh | M. P. Shankar |
| Kappu Bilupu | Puttanna Kanagal | Kalpana, R. N. Sudarshan, Balakrishna | R. Ratna | Ravikumar |
| Madhura Milana | S. K. A. Chari | Udaya Kumar, K. S. Ashwath, Balakrishna | T. Chalapati Rao | K. Subba Rao |
| Maduve Maduve Maduve | Geethapriya | Udaya Kumar, Jayanthi, B. M. Venkatesh | Satyam | Sharadamma |
| Makkale Manege Manikya | A. V. Sheshagiri Rao | Udaya Kumar, Shylashri, Dinesh | Vijaya Bhaskar | N. B. Vatsalan |
| Mallammana Pavaada | Puttanna Kanagal | Rajkumar, B. Saroja Devi, Vajramuni | Vijaya Bhaskar | A. L. S. Productions |
| Manashanthi | M. S. Nayak | Ramesh, K. S. Ashwath, Pandari Bai | A. A. Raj | M. S. Nayak |
| Margadarshi | M. R. Vittal | Rajkumar, Chandrakala, Balakrishna | M. Ranga Rao | Srikanth Patel |
| Matrabhoomi | M. S. Gopinath | Udaya Kumar, Kalpana, A. L. A. Naidu | Satyam | A. L. A. Naidu |
| Mayor Muthanna | Siddalingaiah | Rajkumar, Bharathi, B. V. Radha | Rajan–Nagendra | Ambuja Dwarakish |
| Mukunda Chandra | S. K. A. Chari | Kalyan Kumar, Udaya Kumar, B. V. Radha | Rajan–Nagendra | M. H. Narayanappa |
| Namma Makkalu | R. Nagendra Rao | Pandari Bai, K. S. Ashwath, Vadiraj | Vijaya Bhaskar | Harini |
| Niraparaadhi | B. Valii Nayagam | Kalyan Kumar, Balakrishna, Vandana, Sowkar Janaki | N. S. Thygarajan | M. T. Kulandaivelu |
| Odahuttidavaru | B. N. Haridaas | Kalyan Kumar, Pandari Bai | S. Hanumatha | B. S. Ranga |
| Operation Jackpot Nalli C.I.D 999 | Dorai-Bhagawan | Rajkumar, Rekha, Surekha | G. K. Venkatesh | Dorai-Bhagawan |
| Punarjanma | Peketi Sivaram | Rajkumar, Jayanthi, Chandrakala | Dulaalsen | Sri Bhagawati |
| Punya Purusha | K. Janakiram | Rajesh, Pandari Bai, Chandrakala | Satyam | K. Janakiram |
| Shiva Bhakta | K. V. Srinivas | Udaya Kumar, Bharathi, Dwarakish | S. Hanumatha | B. S. Ranga |
| Suvarna Bhoomi | A. M. Samiulla | Rajesh, R. N. Sudarshan, Shylashri | Vijaya Bhaskar | A. M. Samiulla |
| Vichithra Samsara | S. N. Singh | Dikki Madhava Rao, B. V. Radha, Mynavathi, Dwarakish | Sathyam | Mohini Productions |
| Uyyale | N. Lakshminarayan | Rajkumar, Kalpana, K. S. Ashwath | Vijaya Bhaskar | Bharat Enterprises |
| Yellelu Naane | M. S. Gopinath | R. N. Sudarshan, Dwarakish, Kavitha | Satyam | B. V. Ravi Kottarakara |

== See also ==
- Kannada films of 1968
- Kannada films of 1970
