= List of Kannada films of 1973 =

== Top-grossing films ==
Rank	Title	Collection	Ref.
1.	Gandhada Gudi	₹2.5 crore (₹100 crore in 2025)	

== Released films ==
The following is a list of films produced in the Kannada film industry in India in 1973, presented in alphabetical order.

Title	Director	Cast	Music
Abachurina Post Office	N. Lakshminarayan	Naani, Girija Lokesh, Ramesh Bhat	Vijaya Bhaskar
Bangarada Kalla	Shankar D Singh	Sangram Singh, Ranga, B. V. Radha, Anita, Sampath	Satyam
Bharatada Ratna	T. V. Singh	Udaya Kumar, Jayanthi, Leelavathi	R. Sudarsanam
Beesida Bale	B. A. Arasu	Ramgopal, Jayalakshmi, Ravikala	Rajan–Nagendra
Bidugade	Y. R. Swamy	Rajkumar, Bharathi, Rajesh	M. Ranga Rao
CID 72	K. S. L. Swamy	Srinath, Rajasree, Rajesh	Vijaya Bhaskar
Cowboy Kulla	Vijay	Dwarakish, Udaya Kumar, Vajramuni, Jothilakshmi	Rajan–Nagendra
Devaru Kotta Thangi	K. S. L. Swamy	Rajkumar, Srinath, Jayanthi, B. V. Radha, Kala, Narasimharaju	Upendra Kumar
Dharma Patni	Aaruru Pattabhi	Rajashankar, Vijayakala, Leelavathi	Rajan–Nagendra
Doorada Betta	Siddalingaiah	Rajkumar, Bharathi, Leelavathi, K. S. Ashwath, Dwarakish, M. P. Shankar	G. K. Venkatesh
Edakallu Guddada Mele	Puttanna Kanagal	Chandrashekhar, Jayanthi, Aarathi, Srinath	M. Ranga Rao
Gandhada Gudi	Vijay	Rajkumar, Kalpana, Vishnuvardhan, Balakrishna	Rajan–Nagendra
Jaya Vijaya	A. V. Sheshagiri Rao	Gangadhar, Jayanthi, Dinesh	Vijaya Bhaskar
Jwala Mohini	S. N. Singh	Rajasree, Ranga, Venkatesh, B. V. Radha, Sampath	Satyam
Kaadu	Girish Karnad	Girish Karnad, G. S. Nataraj, Amrish Puri, Nandini	B. V. Karanth
Kaanada Kai	K. Seetharam	Srinath, Shylashri, Ramesh	R. Rathna
Kesarina Kamala	R. N. Jayagopal	Shringar Nagaraj, Kalpana, Uma Shivakumar, Sampath	Vijaya Bhaskar
Mane Belagida Sose	Srikanth	Vishnuvardhan, Aarathi, Bharathi	Vijaya Bhaskar
Mooroovare Vajragalu	Y. R. Swamy	Rajkumar, Aarathi, Manjula, Srinath, Jayanthi	R. Sudarsanam
Sahadharmini	K. S. Satyanarayana	B. Saroja Devi, Rajesh, Shubha	R. Ratna
Sankalpa	P. V. Nanjaraja Urs	Ananth Nag, C. R. Simha, Bindu Jayadev, Vishwanatha Shastry, Saroja	Vijaya Bhaskar
Seethe Alla Savithri	Vadiraj	Vishnuvardhan, Ambareesh, Udaya Chandrika, Jayalakshmi	Vijaya Bhaskar
Swayamvara	Y. R. Swamy	Rajkumar, Bharathi, Dinesh	Rajan–Nagendra

== See also ==
- Kannada films of 1972
- Kannada films of 1974
