= Chi. Udayashankar =

Indian Kannada lyricist

- Born: Chitnahalli Udayashankar; 18 February 1934; Chittanalli, Gubbi, Kingdom of Mysore, British India
- Died: 2 July 1993 (aged 59)
- Other name: Udaya Shankar
- Occupations: Lyricist, writer
- Spouse: Sharadamma
- Children: 3 including Chi. Guru Dutt, Chi. Ravi Shankar
- Parent: Chi Sadashivaiah (father)

Chitnahalli Udayashankar (18 February 1934 – 2 July 1993; born in Chitnahalli) was an Indian lyricist and dialogue writer in the Kannada film industry for over three decades, who penned more than 3000 songs for films and devotional songs. His dialogues, screenplay and lyrics were instrumental in the success of many movies of Dr. Rajkumar. Udayashankar received four Karnataka State Film Award for Best Dialogue and two Karnataka State Film Award for Best Screenplay. He was the son of lyricist Chi. Sadashivaiah. His son Chi. Guru Dutt is an actor and director in Kannada and Tamil feature films.

== Career ==
In 1963, Chi Udayshankar wrote dialogues for the first time. This was for the film Santha Thukaram starring Rajkumar. He co-wrote dialogues and lyrics for numerous Kannada movies and worked with his father in his early career. He directed the movie Manku Dinne in 1968. He wrote a great deal of dialogues and lyrics for many Rajkumar movies. He worked with Rajkumar from 1963 to 1993 in more than 90 movies. He also acted in movies like Lagna Pathrike, Shankar Guru, Haalu Jenu, Nee Nanna Gellalare, Jeevana Chakra, Halli Rambhe Belli Bombe and Anand.

== Style ==
Chi Udayashakar used to write his lyrics in simple and easily understood words. He was given the title 'Sahithya Rathna' (gem of literature) for his work.

== Filmography ==
Year	Film title	Remarks
1963	Santha Thukaram	Dialogue
1964	Annapoorna	Lyrics
1964	Amarashilpi Jakanachari	Lyrics
1965	Mahasathi Anasuya	Screenplay, Dialogue and Lyrics
1965	Sathi Savithri	Lyrics for 2 songs, others penned by R N Jayagopal 3 Chi Sadashivaiah 2
1966	Bala Nagamma	Screenplay, Dialogue. He co-wrote lyrics with his father Chi Sadashivaiah
1967	Anuradha	Screenplay, Dialogue and Lyrics
1967	Lagna Pathrike	Story, Screenplay, Dialogue, Lyrics and Acting
1967	Bangarada Hoovu	Dialogue and Lyrics. He co-wrote lyrics with Vijaya Naarasimha
1967	Sri Purandara Dasaru	Dialogue
1968	Gandhinagara	Dialogue and Lyrics
1968	Bangalore Mail	Dialogue and Lyrics
1968	Manku Dinne	Story, Dialogue and Lyrics
1968	Bhagyada Bagilu	Dialogue and Lyrics
1968	Nata Sarvabhouma	Dialogue and Lyrics
1968	Rowdy Ranganna	Dialogue and Lyrics
1968	Simha Swapna	Dialogue and Lyrics
1969	Choori Chikkanna	Dialogue and Lyrics
1969	Uyyale	Lyrics for one song. Other 4 penned by R. N. Jayagopal, Vijaya Narasimha, Geethapriya
1969	Eradu Mukha	Dialogue and Lyrics
1969	Mayor Muthanna	Dialogue and Lyrics
1969	Operation Jackpot Nalli C.I.D 999	Lyrics, co-wrote with M. Narendra Babu
1969	Bhale Basava	Dialogue. Lyrics: Co-wrote with his father Chi. Sadashivaiah
1969	Gruhalakshmi	Story, Screenplay, Dialogue. Lyrics: Co-wrote with his father Chi. Sadashivaiah, Vijaya Narasimha and Kanagal Prabhakar Shastry
1969	Brundaavana	Dialogue and Lyrics.
1969	Shiva Bhakta	Dialogue and Lyrics.
1970	Bhale Jodi	Dialogue and Lyrics for 3 songs. Other 2 penned by R. N. Jayagopal
1970	Baalu Belagithu	Dialogue and Lyrics for 3 songs. Other 1 penned by Vijaya Narasimha
1970	Mr. Rajkumar	Dialogue and Lyrics.
1970	C.I.D. Rajanna	Dialogue and Lyrics.
1970	Arishina Kumkuma	Dialogue and Lyrics.
1970	Aaru Mooru Ombhatthu	Dialogue and Lyrics.
1970	Boregowda Bangalorige Banda	Lyrics.
1970	Gejje Pooje	Lyrics for 1 song. Other 4 penned by R. N. Jayagopal (2) and Vijaya Narasimha (2).
1970	Lakshmi Saraswathi	Dialogue. Lyrics: Co-wrote with his father Chi. Sadashivaiah.
1970	Devara Makkalu	Dialogue and Lyrics for 1 song. Other 3 penned by Vijaya Narasimha and Ugranarasimha
1970	Modala Raatri	Dialogue and Lyrics.
1970	Mooru Mutthugalu	Dialogue and Lyrics.
1970	Sedige Sedu	Dialogue and Lyrics.
1970	Paropakari	Dialogue and Lyrics for 2 songs. Other 3 penned by R. N. Jayagopal
1970	Rangamahal Rahasya	Lyrics, co-wrote with Sorat Ashwath and Vijaya Narasimha.
1971	Kasturi Nivasa	Dialogue and Lyrics for 3 songs. Other 3 penned by R. N. Jayagopal (2) and Vijaya Narasimha (1)
1971	Nyayave Devaru	Dialogue and Lyrics.
1971	Baala Bandhana	Lyrics for 1 song
1971	Kula Gourava	Dialogue and Lyrics for 2 songs, Others 4 penned by R. N. Jayagopal (3) and Vijaya Narasimha (1)
1971	Pratidwani	Dialogue and Lyrics
1971	Namma Samsara	Dialogue and Lyrics for 2 songs. Other 2 penned by R. N. Jayagopal
1971	Thayi Devaru	Dialogue and Lyrics
1971	Bhale Bhaskar	Dialogue and Lyrics.
1971	Bhale Adrushtavo Adrushta	Dialogue and Lyrics, co-wrote with K. S. L. Swamy.
1971	Sri Krishna Rukmini Satyabhama	Dialogue. Lyrics: Co-wrote with his father Chi. Sadashivaiah
1971	Sidila Mari	Lyrics
1971	Signalman Sidappa	Lyrics
1971	Sothu Geddavalu	Lyrics, co-wrote with R. N. Jayagopal and Vijaya Narasimha.
1971	Anugraha	Lyrics, co-wrote with Sorat Ashwath and H L Sheshachandra
1972	Hrudaya Sangama	Lyrics for 1 song. Other 5 written by R. N. Jayagopal (2), Geethapriya (2) and Vijaya Narasimha (1).
1972	Bhale Huchcha	Story, Screenplay, Dialogue and Lyrics for 1 song. Other 4 penned by Vijaya Naarasimha (2), Geethapriya (1) and Hunsur Krishnamurthy (1).
1972	Bangarada Manushya	Lyrics for 1 song. Other 4 penned by Hunsur Krishnamurthy (2), R. N. Jayagopal (1) and Vijaya Naarasimha (1).
1972	Naagarahaavu	Dialogue and Lyrics for 2 songs. Other 4 penned by Vijaya Naarasimha (3) and R. N. Jayagopal (1).
1972	Kranti Veera	Dialogue and Lyrics
1972	Kulla Agent 000	Dialogue and Lyrics
1972	Nanda Gokula	Story, Dialogue and Lyrics for 2 songs. Other 2 penned by Vijaya Naarasimha. Also, co-wrote screenplay with Y. R. Swamy.
1973	Devaru Kotta Thangi	Dialogue and Lyrics for 2 songs.
1973	Bidugade	Dialogue and Lyrics
1973	Doorada Betta	Dialogue and Lyrics for 1 song.
1973	Gandhada Gudi	Dialogue and Lyrics
1973	Bangaarada Panjara	Dialogue and Lyrics
1973	Cowboy Kulla	Dialogue and Lyrics
1973	Swayamvara	Lyrics for 1 song
1973	CID 72	Lyrics
1973	Mooruvare Vajragalu	Screenplay, Dialogue. Lyrics: Co-wrote with his father Chi. Sadashivaiah.
1973	Jwala Mohini	Screenplay
1974	Sampathige Saval	Screenplay, Dialogue and Lyrics for 3 songs, other 1 penned by R. N. Jayagopal
1974	Bangaarada Panjara	Dialogue and Lyrics
1974	Bhakta Kumbara	Lyrics, co-wrote with Hunsur Krishnamurthy
1974	Bhootayyana Maga Ayyu	Lyrics for 2 songs. Other 2 penned by R. N. Jayagopal (1) and Vijaya Naarasimha (1).
1974	Chamundeshwari Mahime	Lyrics, co-wrote with his father Chi. Sadashivaiah
1974	Sri Srinivasa Kalyana	Screenplay, Dialogue and Lyrics for 8 songs, other 4 penned by Chi. Sadashivaiah
1974	Eradu Kanasu	Dialogue and Lyrics for 5 songs
1974	Maga Mommaga	Dialogue and Lyrics, co-wrote with Vijaya Naarasimha
1974	Upasane	Lyrics for 2 songs. Other 3 penned by R. N. Jayagopal (2) and Vijaya Naarasimha (1).
1974	Mannina Magalu	Dialogue. Lyrics: Co-wrote with his father Chi. Sadashivaiah.
1975	Mayura	Dialogue and Lyrics
1975	Shubhamangala	Lyrics for 1 song. Rest 5 penned by Vijaya Narasimha (2), M. N. Vyasa Rao (2) and Kanagal Prabhakar Shastry (1)
1975	Thrimurthy	Dialogue and Lyrics
1975	Kalla Kulla	Dialogue. Lyrics: Co-wrote with R. N. Jayagopal
1975	Bhagya Jyothi	Lyrics, co-wrote with G. V. Iyer, Vijaya Naarasimha, R. N. Jayagopal and P. B. Sreenivas
1975	Devara Gudi	Dialogue and Lyrics
1975	Daari Tappida Maga	Story, Dialogue and Lyrics for 1 song. Other 3 penned by R. N. Jayagopal (2) and Vijaya Naarasimha (1)
1975	Hennu Samsarada Kannu	Dialogue and Lyrics
1975	Devara Kannu	Lyrics for 2 songs. Other 3 penned by Vijaya Naarasimha
1975	Nagakanye	Lyrics for 3 songs. Other 3 penned by Hunsur Krishnamurthy
1975	Ninagagi Naanu	Dialogue and Lyrics
1975	Nireekshe	Lyrics, co-wrote with K. R. Seetharama Sastry
1975	Sarpa Kaavalu	Lyrics, co-wrote with R. N. Jayagopal and M. N. Aradhya
1975	Mahadeshwara Pooja Phala	Lyrics for 2 songs. Other 1 penned by R. N. Jayagopal
1975	Mane Belaku	Dialogue. Lyrics: Co-wrote with his father Chi. Sadashivaiah
1975	Viplava Vanithe	Lyrics, co-wrote with Vijaya Narasimha and R. N. Jayagopal
1976	Premada Kanike	Screenplay, Dialogue and Lyrics for 4 songs. Rest 2 penned by Vijaya Naarasimha
1976	Aparadhi	Dialogue. Lyrics: Co-wrote with Vijaya Narasimha
1976	Badavara Bandhu	Dialogue and Lyrics
1976	Baduku Bangaravayitu	Dialogue and Lyrics
1976	Bahaddur Gandu	Screenplay, Dialogue and Lyrics
1976	Bangarada Gudi	Dialogue and Lyrics
1976	Bayalu Daari	Dialogue and Lyrics
1976	Besuge	Lyrics for 1 song. Other 4 penned by Vijaya Narasimha, R. N. Jayagopal, Geethapriya and Shyamsundar Kulkarni
1976	College Ranga	Lyrics, co-wrote with Vijaya Narasimha and R. N. Jayagopal
1976	Devaru Kotta Vara	Dialogue and Lyrics
1976	Hudugatada Hudugi	Dialogue and Lyrics
1976	Kanasu Nanasu	Dialogue and Lyrics
1976	Makkala Bhagya	Lyrics, co-wrote with Geethapriya, K. S. L. Swamy and Ravishree
1976	Mugiyada Kathe	Dialogue. Lyrics: Co-wrote with R. N. Jayagopal
1976	Naa Ninna Mareyalare	Dialogue and Lyrics
1976	Punardattha	Lyrics, co-wrote with Vijaya Naarasimha and R. N. Jayagopal
1976	Phoenix	Lyrics
1976	Tulasi	Dialogue. Lyrics: Co-wrote with R. N. Jayagopal, Vijaya Naarasimha and K. S. L. Swamy
1976	Vijaya Vani	Lyrics, co-wrote with R. N. Jayagopal
1976	Raja Nanna Raja	Screenplay, Dialogue and Lyrics
1977	Babruvahana	Lyrics for 3 songs
1977	Banashankari	Dialogue and lyrics, co-written with his grandfather Chi. Srikantaiah and his father Chi. Sadashivaiah
1977	Bayasade Banda Bhagya	Dialogue and Lyrics
1977	Bhagyavantharu	Dialogue and Lyrics
1977	Chinna Ninna Muddaduve	Lyrics, co-wrote with R. N. Jayagopal
1977	Deepa	Dialogue. Lyrics: Co-wrote with Vijaya Naarasimha, M. N. Vyasa Rao, Doddarangegowda
1977	Dhanalakshmi	Dialogue. Lyrics: Co-wrote with K. S. Sathyanarayana
1977	Galate Samsara	Dialogue and Lyrics
1977	Ganda Hendathi	Dialogue and Lyrics
1977	Giri Kanye	Dialogue & Lyrics
1977	Hemavathi	Lyrics
1977	Kartavyada Kare	Lyrics, co-wrote with R. N. Jayagopal and Vijaya Naarasimha
1977	Kittu Puttu	Dialogue and Lyrics
1977	Kokila	Lyrics
1977	Kumkuma Rakshe	Dialogue and Lyrics
1977	Lakshmi Nivasa	Dialogue. Lyrics: Co-wrote with Hunsur Krishnamurthy
1977	Mugdha Manava	Lyrics for 1 song. Rest 4 written by R. N. Jayagopal (3) and M. Narendra Babu (1)
1977	Nagarahole	Lyrics for 2 songs. Rest penned by R. N. Jayagopal and Vijaya Naarasimha (1 each)
1977	Olavu Geluvu	Dialogue and Lyrics
1977	Pavana Ganga	Lyrics
1977	Sahodarara Savaal	Dialogue and Lyrics
1977	Sanaadi Appanna	Screenplay, Dialogue and Lyrics
1977	Shrimanthana Magalu	Dialogue. Lyrics: Co-wrote with R. N. Jayagopal
1977	Sose Tanda Soubhagya	Dialogue. Lyrics for 3 songs. Rest penned by R. N. Jayagopal (1) and Vijaya Naarasimha (2)
1977	Thayigintha Devarilla	Dialogue and Lyrics
1978	Shankar Guru	Dialogue and Lyrics
1978	Balu Aparoopa Nam Jodi	Lyrics
1978	Bhale Huduga	Lyrics
1978	Halli Haida	Lyrics
1978	Kiladi Jodi	Lyrics for 4 songs. Other 1 song penned by Doddarangegowda
1978	Kiladi Kittu	Dialogue. Lyrics: Co-wrote with R. N. Jayagopal and Vijaya Naarasimha
1978	Muyyige Muyyi	Lyrics, co-wrote with Vijaya Naarasimha and Doddarangegowda
1978	Nanna Prayaschittha	Lyrics, co-wrote with Ugranarasimha
1978	Thayige Thakka Maga	Dialogue and Lyrics
1978	Operation Diamond Racket	Dialogue and Lyrics
1978	Priya	Dialogue and Lyrics
1978	Singaporenalli Raja Kulla	Dialogue and Lyrics
1978	Sneha Sedu	Dialogue and Lyrics
1978	Suli	Dialogue and Lyrics
1978	Thappida Thala	Lyrics, co-wrote with Hunsur Krishnamurthy
1978	Vasantha Lakshmi	Lyrics for 4 songs. 1 song penned by R. N. Jayagopal
1979	Huliya Haalina Mevu	Screenplay, Dialogue and Lyrics
1979	Adalu Badalu	Dialogue and lyrics for 1 song. Rest 3 songs penned by Vijaya Naarasimha (2) and Doddarangegowda (1)
1979	Aliya Devaru	Dialogue and Lyrics
1979	Asadhya Aliya	Dialogue and lyrics for 5 songs. 1 song penned by Doddarangegowda
1979	Chandanada Gombe	Dialogue and Lyrics
1979	I Love You	Dialogue and Lyrics
1979	Nanobba Kalla	Dialogue and Lyrics
1980	Ravi Chandra	Dialogue and Lyrics
1980	Vasantha Geetha	Dialogue and Lyrics
1980	Narada Vijaya	Dialogue and Lyrics
1980	Auto Raja	Lyrics
1981	Havina Hede	Dialogue and Lyrics
1981	Bhagyavantha	Dialogue and Lyrics
1981	Nee Nanna Gellalare	Dialogue and Lyrics
1981	Keralida Simha	Dialogue and Lyrics
1981	Garjane	Dialogue and Lyrics
1982	Hosa Belaku	Dialogue and Lyrics for 5 songs. 1 song is from Kuvempu used here.
1982	Haalu Jenu	Dialogue, Acting and Lyrics
1982	Baadada Hoo	Lyrics only
1982	Nanna Devaru	Lyrics only
1982	Chalisuva Modagalu	Dialogue and Lyrics
1982	Mullina Gulabi	Dialogue and Lyrics
1983	Kaviratna Kalidasa	Dialogue and Lyrics
1983	Bhakta Prahlada	Screenplay, Dialogue and Lyrics
1983	Eradu Nakshatragalu	Dialogue and Lyrics
1983	Samayada Gombe	Dialogue and Lyrics
1983	Kaamana Billu	Screenplay, Dialogue and Lyrics for 4 songs, other 1 from Kuvempu
1983	Shravana Banthu	Screenplay co-wrote with Singeetam Srinivasa Rao, Dialogue and Lyrics
1984	Apoorva Sangama	Lyrics
1984	Yarivanu	Screenplay, Dialogue and Lyrics
1984	Olavu Moodidaga	Dialogue and Lyrics
1978	Sneha Sedu	Dialogues
1985	Dhruva Thare	Screenplay, Dialogue and Lyrics
1985	Ade Kannu	Screenplay, Dialogue and Lyrics
1985	Jeevana Chakra	Dialogue and Lyrics
1985	Jwaalamukhi	Screenplay co-wrote with Singeetam Srinivasa Rao, Dialogue and Lyrics
1985	Thayi Thande	Dialogues
1986	Bhagyada Lakshmi Baramma	Screenplay with Singeetam Srinivasa Rao, Dialogue and Lyrics
1986	Anuraga Aralithu	Screenplay, Dialogue and Lyrics
1986	Guri	Dialogue and Lyrics
1987	Ondu Muttina Kathe	Dialogue and Lyrics
1987	Shruthi Seridaga	Screenplay with Singeetam Srinivasa Rao, Dialogue and Lyrics
1987	Karunamayi	Lyrics
1988	Shiva Mecchida Kannappa	Dialogue and Lyrics
1988	Chiranjeevi Sudhakar	Screenplay co-wrote with Singeetam Srinivasa Rao, Dialogue and Lyrics
1988	Devatha Manushya	Screenplay co-wrote with Singeetam Srinivasa Rao, Dialogue and Lyrics
1989	Parashuram	Dialogue and Lyrics for 2 songs. Other 3 songs penned by Hamsalekha 2 and T P Kailasam 1
1989	Nanjundi Kalyana	Script
1991	Gandu Sidigundu	Dialogue and Lyrics
1991	Halli Rambhe Belli Bombe	Dialogue, Lyrics and actor
1991	Kalyana Mantapa	Dialogue and Lyrics
1992	Jeevana Chaitra	Screenplay, Dialogue and Lyrics for 4 songs. Other 2 songs penned by K S Narasimhaswamy 1 and Mugur Mallappa
1992	Ksheera Sagara	Dialogue and Lyrics
1992	Aakasmika	Dialogue
1993	Gadibidi Ganda	Dialogue
1993	Roopayi Raja	Screenplay
1993	Jaga Mechida Huduga	Screenplay, dialogues
1993	Apoorva Jodi	Story, screenplay and dialogues
1993	Ananda Jyothi	Screenplay, dialogues
1993	Vasantha Poornima	Screenplay dialogues
1994	Odahuttidavaru	Screenplay, Dialogue and Lyrics for 1 song. Rest of each one song penned by Vijaya Naarasimha, M N Vyasa Rao, Hamsalekha, Sri Ranga and Geethapriya
1994	Gandhada Gudi Part 2	Dialogues and lyrics

== Awards ==
Karnataka State Film Awards

- 1970–71 – Karnataka State Film Award for Best Dialogue – Kula Gourava
- 1972–73 – Karnataka State Film Award for Best Dialogue – Naagarahaavu
- 1975–76 – Karnataka State Film Award for Best Dialogue – Premada Kanike
- 1985–86 – Karnataka State Film Award for Best Screenplay – Bhagyada Lakshmi Baramma (Shared with Singeetam Srinivasa Rao)
- 1986–87 – Karnataka State Film Award for Best Screenplay – Anand (Shared with Singeetam Srinivasa Rao)
- 1992–93 – Karnataka State Film Award for Best Dialogue – Jeevana Chaitra
