= Thendral Veesum =

1962 film directed by B. S. Ranga

- Poster
- Directed by: B. S. Ranga
- Screenplay by: Virudhai Ramasamy
- Produced by: B. S. Ranga
- Starring: Kalyan Kumar; M. R. Radha; A. Karunanidhi; Krishna Kumari; Rajasree
- Music by: Viswanathan–Ramamoorthy
- Production company: Vikram Productions
- Release date: 7 September 1962
- Country: India
- Languages: Tamil; Telugu

Thendral Veesum (transl. Breezy air is blowing) is a 1962 Indian Tamil language film produced and directed by B. S. Ranga. The film stars Kalyan Kumar, M. R. Radha, Krishna Kumari and Rajasree. The film was simultaneously produced in Telugu with the title Aasa Jeevulu.

== Cast ==
=== Tamil version ===
The list was adapted from K. Neelamegam's Thiraikalanjiyam Part2.

- Kalyan Kumar
- M. R. Radha
- A. Karunanidhi
- Prem Nazir
- S. Rama Rao
- V. Nagayya
- Krishna Kumari
- Rajasree
- Rukmini

=== Telugu version ===
- Ramanamurthy
- Rajasree
- Relangi
- Girija
- Ramana Reddy
- Kutumbarao
- Chayadevi
- V. Nagayya

== Production ==
The film was simultaneously produced in Telugu with the title Aasa Jeevulu (lit. "Hopeful Souls"). The song Paadinaar Kavignar Paadinaar was recorded for Nichaya Thaamboolam with Sivaji Ganesan and Jamuna featuring in the scene. But that was not included in the film for some reason. B. S. Ranga who was the producer and director for that film as well, used the song in this film.

== Soundtrack ==
Music was composed by the duo Viswanathan–Ramamoorthy. The song Aambala Manasu Aasaiyinaale Aaduthu sung by S. C. Krishnan, K. Jamuna Rani and L. R. Eswari was recorded in the disc but was not included in the film.

Song	Singer/s	Lyricist	Length
"Paadinaar Kavignar Paadinaar"	T. M. Soundararajan & P. Susheela	Kannadasan	04:57
"Meettaadha Veenai Idhu"	P. Susheela	Kannadasan	03:06
"Ellorum Vaazhgavenru"	P. Susheela	Kannadasan	02:35
"Veetinile Iruvar Vaazhginraar"	P. Susheela	Kannadasan	
"Paatu Pirandhavudan Paarka Vandhaaye"	P. Susheela	Kannadasan	03:20
"Aasaiyil Pirapathu Thunivu"	P. Susheela	Mayavanathan	03:33
"Sandhanathil Nirameduthu"	S. Janaki	Mayavanathan	03:17
"Yaen Mama Kovamaa"	G. K. Venkatesh & L. R. Eswari	Mayavanathan	03:18
"Azhagaana Malare Arivaana Porule"	P. B. Sreenivas	Mayavanathan	03:31
"Aasaiyil Pirapathu Thunivu 2"	P. Susheela	Mayavanathan	03:11
"Aambala Manasu Aasaiyinaale"	S. C. Krishnan, K. Jamuna Rani & L. R. Eswari		03:24
