= Kaalinga =

1980 Indian film by V. Somashekhar

Kalinga
- Directed by: V. Somashekhar
- Written by: R. N. Jayagopal (dialogues)
- Screenplay by: V. Somashekhar
- Story by: Ghai; Bhalla
- Produced by: Srikanth Nahatha
- Starring: Vishnuvardhan; Rati Agnihotri; Udaykumar; Vajramuni
- Cinematography: S. V. Srikanth
- Edited by: D. Venkatarathnam
- Music by: Satyam
- Production companies: Srikanth & Srikanth Enterprises
- Distributed by: Srikanth & Srikanth Enterprises
- Release date: 11 March 1980
- Running time: 147 min
- Country: India
- Language: Kannada

Kalinga is a 1980 Indian Kannada-language film directed by V. Somashekhar and produced by Srikanth Nahatha. The film stars Vishnuvardhan, Rati Agnihotri, Udaykumar, and Vajramuni. It is a remake of the 1976 Hindi movie Kalicharan.

== Cast ==
- Vishnuvardhan
- Rati Agnihotri
- Udaykumar as Vinayak Patil
- Vajramuni as 'Lion' Dayanand
- Dinesh
- Thoogudeepa Srinivas
- Shakti Prasad
- Tiger Prabhakar as Danny
- Sampath
- Geetha
- B. Jayashree
- Rajeshwari
- Baby Rekha
- Baby Lakshmi
- Jyothilakshmi
- Hanumanthachar
- Shivaprakash
- Ashwath Narayana

== Soundtrack ==
The music was composed by Satyam.

No.	Song	Singers	Lyrics	Length (m:ss)
1	"Bhayavanu Sidu"	S. Janaki, Malaysia Vasudevan	Chi. Udaya Shankar	04:56
2	"Durugutti Nodabedayya"	S. P. Balasubrahmanyam, P. Susheela	R. N. Jayagopal	04:58
3	"Thata Pata Hanigalu"	S. P. Balasubrahmanyam, P. Susheela	Chi. Udaya Shankar	04:41
4	"Thayi Thande Ibbaru"	S. Janaki, Vani Jairam	Chi. Udaya Shankar	04:55
