= Parvathi Kalyana =

1967 Indian Kannada film by B. S. Ranga

- Directed by: B. S. Ranga
- Written by: Chi Sadashivaiah (dialogues)
- Produced by: B. S. Ranga
- Starring: Rajkumar; Chandrakala; Udaykumar; M. P. Shankar; Raghavendra Rao
- Cinematography: B. N. Haridas
- Edited by: P. G. Mohan; Devendranath; Chakrapani
- Music by: G. K. Venkatesh
- Production company: Vikram Productions
- Distributed by: Vikram Productions
- Release date: 28 February 1967
- Running time: 129 minutes
- Country: India
- Language: Kannada

Parvathi Kalyana is a 1967 Indian Kannada-language film, directed and produced by B. S. Ranga. The film stars Rajkumar, Chandrakala, Udaykumar, M. P. Shankar and Raghavendra Rao. The musical score was composed by G. K. Venkatesh.

== Cast ==
- Rajkumar as Lord Shiva
- Chandrakala as Goddess Parvathi
- Udaykumar as Narada
- M. P. Shankar as Taraka
- Raghavendra Rao
- Dinesh
- Kuppuraj
- Master Babu
- Pandari Bai
- M. Jayashree
- Vijayalalitha
- Baby Prashanth
- Baby Sunanda

== Soundtrack ==
The music was composed by G. K. Venkatesh and lyrics by Chi. Sadashivaiah.

| No. | Song | Singers | Length (m:ss) |
|---|---|---|---|
| 1 | "Shyama Mohana Madhava" | P. B. Srinivas | 02:33 |
| 2 | "Gangeya Dharisidena" | S. Janaki | 02:19 |
| 3 | "Vanamaali Vaikuntapathe" | P. B. Sreenivas, Bangalore Latha | 03:08 |
| 4 | "Jayashankara Bhavagochara" | B. K. Sumitra | 02:43 |
| 5 | "Jaya Hey Shankara" | P. Leela | 04:47 |
| 6 | "Navavasantha Naguta Banda" | L. R. Eswari, chorus | 03:02 |
| 7 | "Baaleya More Idu" | S. Janaki | 03:13 |
| 8 | "Maara Chittha Chora" | Bangalore Latha, L. R. Eswari | 04:27 |
| 9 | "Endu Madida Papa" | P. Leela | 01:18 |
| 10 | "Vishwavandya Vighnesha Ganesha" | P. B. Srinivas, chorus | 01:48 |
