= Bala Nagamma (1966 film) =

- Directed by: P. R. Kaundinya
- Screenplay by: Chi Udayashankar
- Produced by: Vikram Srinivas
- Starring: Rajkumar; Udaykumar; Rajasree; Narasimharaju; Master Babu
- Cinematography: B. N. Haridas
- Edited by: T. Chakrapani
- Music by: S. Rajeshwara Rao
- Production company: Sanathana Kalamandira
- Distributed by: Sanathana Kalamandira
- Release date: 5 March 1966
- Country: India
- Language: Kannada

Bala Nagamma is a 1966 Indian Kannada-language film, directed by P. R. Kaundinya and produced by Vikram Srinivas. The film stars Rajkumar, Udaykumar, Narasimharaju and Master Babu. The film has musical score by S. Rajeshwara Rao. The movie is based on one of the popular stories of the traditional folklore Burra katha.

== Cast ==
- Rajkumar
- Udaykumar
- Kalpana as Manikya Devi
- Narasimharaju
- Rajasree
- Balakrishna in Guest Appearance
- Pandari Bai in Guest Appearance
- R. T. Rama in Guest Appearance
- V. Nagayya in Guest Appearance
- Chi Sadashivaiah in Guest Appearance
- Master Babu
- Sharada
- Sabitha
- Suryakala
- Janaki
- Baby Vishalakshi

== Production ==
Produced by Sanathana Kalamandira, the filming took place in Vikram Studios, Madras (now Chennai). Rajasree was signed to play the title role opposite Rajkumar. The Indian Express reported on 3 October 1965 that recording of three tracks for the film were complete, and that the producer Vikram Srinivasan confirmed completing filming by November.

== Soundtrack ==
The music was composed by Nageshwara Rao.

| No. | Song | Singers | Lyrics | Length (m:ss) |
|---|---|---|---|---|
| 1 | "Kanda Kanmaniye" | L. R. Eswari | Chi. Udaya Shankar | 03:01 |
| 2 | "Kala Bandithu" | Bangalore Latha, L. R. Eswari | | |
