= Mannina Magalu =

- Directed by: B. S. Ranga
- Written by: Krishnamurthy Puranika (Based on Novel)
- Produced by: B. S. Ranga
- Starring: Udaykumar; Jayanthi; Gangadhar; Aarathi; Rajasree
- Cinematography: B. N. Haridas
- Edited by: V. Chakrapani; M. Devendranath
- Music by: S. Rajeshwara Rao
- Production company: Vikram Productions
- Distributed by: Vikram Productions
- Release date: 28 May 1973
- Country: India
- Language: Kannada

Mannina Magalu ( transl. Daughter of the soil) is a 1973 Indian Kannada-language film, directed and produced by B. S. Ranga. The film stars Udaykumar, Jayanthi, Gangadhar, Aarathi, and Rajasree. The film has musical score by S. Rajeshwara Rao and is based on a novel of same name by Krishnamoorthy Puranik.

== Cast ==
- Udaykumar
- Jayanthi
- Gangadhar
- Aarathi
- Rajasree
- B. Ramadevi
- Annapurnamma
- Mysore Lakshmi
- Saraswathi
- Rukmini
- Ku Raji
- Baby Sumathi
- R. Nagendra Rao
- Balakrishna
- Dinesh (Kannada actor)
- B. M. Venkatesh
- Belur Raghavendra Rao
- Mahadevayya
- H. Ramachandra Shastry
- Bangalore Nagesh
- Narayana Rao
- Srikanth
- Ku Chandrashekar

== Soundtrack ==
The music was composed by S.Rajeswarao with lyrics written by Chi. Udayashankar and Chi.Sadashivaiah.

No.	Song	Singers	Length (m:ss)
1	"Mannina Magalivalu"	P. B. Srinivas	04:28
2	"Thaalu Thaalu"	S. Janaki	02:50
3	"Hettha Thaayiya Bittu"	S. Janaki	03:14
4	"Hunnime Bandide"	P.Susheela	03:14
5	"Iniya Sukhaneeduve"	P.Susheela	03:17
