= Chandrahasa (1965 film) =

- Directed by: B. S. Ranga
- Written by: Chi Sadashivaiah (dialogues)
- Screenplay by: Chi Sadashivaiah
- Story by: Chi Sadashivaiah; Sadashiva Brahmam
- Produced by: B. S. Ranga
- Starring: Rajkumar; Udaykumar; K. S. Ashwath; Narasimharaju
- Cinematography: B. N. Haridas
- Edited by: P. G. Mohan
- Music by: S. Hanumantha Rao
- Production company: Vasanth Pictures
- Distributed by: Vasanth Pictures
- Release date: 1965
- Running time: 152 minutes
- Country: India
- Language: Kannada

Chandrahasa is a 1965 Indian Kannada-language film directed and produced by B. S. Ranga. The film stars Rajkumar, Udaykumar, K. S. Ashwath and Narasimharaju. The film had musical score by S. Hanumantha Rao.

The story is based on a segment of Kannada poet Lakshmeesha's epic Jaimini Bharatha, which tells the life of the Kuntala king Chandrahasa. Actress Jayanthi made a guest appearance in film's climax as Goddess Kaali, and Rajkumar sings Maata marakathashyama maatangi madhushaalini in her praise. B. S. Ranga also shot the film simultaneously in Telugu as Chandrahasa starring Gummadi.

== Cast ==
- Rajkumar as Chandrahasa
- Udaykumar as Shekhara
- K. S. Ashwath as Munishwara
- Narasimharaju as Ganapati
- Rathnakar as Ambala
- R. N. Sudarshan as Madana
- Master Babu as young Chandrahasa
- R. Nagendra Rao as Chakreshwara (cameo)
- Jayanthi as Kali (cameo)
- Srikanth
- A. V. Subba Rao
- Krishna Shastry
- Vijayarao
- Kashinath
- Subramanyam
- Hanumantha Rao
- Shivaji Rao
- Srinivasa Rao
- Kasthuriraj
- L. N. Swamy
- Leelavathi as Vishaya
- Vanisri as Champakamalini
- Pandari Bai as Nandini
- Suryakala
- Sabithadevi
- Ramadevi as Chandi
- B. Jaya as Vishaya's companion
- Radhakumari
- Dinesh
- M. Jayashree as Hemavathi

== Soundtrack ==
- "Kaviya Madhura Kalpane" (P. B. Sreenivas, S. Janaki)
- "Baa Baa Bayasida Banasiri Baa" (Amirbai Karnataki)
- "Pampaa Chiranagari" (Vijaya Desai)
- "Panchaamrutha" (G.T. Balakrishna, Neelagaara)
- "Sri Sheshashayana" (P. Leela)
- "Yaava Kaviya Shrungaara Kalpaneyo (Ghantasala, Bangalore Latha)
