= Dhanalakshmi (film) =

- Directed by: K. S. Sathyanarayana
- Written by: M. D. Sundar
- Produced by: H. N. Maruthi
- Starring: Srinath; Manjula; Leelavathi; Dwarakish
- Cinematography: Z. A. Khan
- Edited by: P. Bhakthavathsalam
- Music by: M. Ranga Rao
- Release date: 1977
- Running time: 140 minutes
- Country: India
- Language: Kannada

Dhanalakshmi is a 1977 Indian Kannada language film directed by K. S. Sathyanarayana. The film stars Srinath, Manjula and Leelavathi. The film is based on a story where a number of thieves enter a household as disguised guests and acquaintances to loot a secret treasure supposed to be hidden in there.

== Cast ==
- Srinath
- Manjula
- Leelavathi
- Dinesh
- Shivaram
- Baby Indira
- Shakti Prasad
- Ambareesh

== Soundtrack ==
The music was composed by M. Ranga Rao with lyrics by Chi. Udaya Shankar and K. S. Sathyanarayana.

Track listing
No.	Title	Lyrics	Singer(s)	Length
1.	"Nille Neenalle"	K. S. Sathyanarayana	P. Susheela, S. P. Balasubrahmanyam
2.	"Bhoomige Banda Kaamannano"	Chi. Udaya Shankar	S. P. Balasubrahmanyam, S. Janaki
3.	"Dhanalakshmi Daye Thoru"	Chi. Udaya Shankar	P. B. Sreenivas
4.	"Hunnime Belakanu"	Chi. Udaya Shankar	S. Janaki
