= Mahishasura Mardini =

- Kannada poster
- Directed by: B. S. Ranga
- Screenplay by: B. S. Ranga
- Produced by: B. S. Ranga
- Starring: Rajkumar; Sowcar Janaki; V. Nagayya; Udaykumar; Narasimharaju
- Cinematography: B. S. Ranga
- Edited by: P. G. Mohan; M. Devendranath
- Music by: G. K. Venkatesh
- Production company: Vikram Productions
- Distributed by: Vikram Productions
- Release date: 1959
- Running time: 133 minutes
- Country: India
- Language: Kannada

Mahishasura Mardini ( lit. 'Slayer of Mahishasura'; a name for Durga) is a 1959 Indian Kannada-language film, directed and produced by B. S. Ranga. The film stars Rajkumar, V. Nagayya, Udaykumar and Narasimharaju. It was dubbed in seven other languages and is retrospectively identified as amongst the first major Pan-India films.

The film features a musical score by G. K. Venkatesh. It was dubbed in seven languages, including in Telugu under the same name and in Hindi as Durga Maata (lit. 'Mother Durga', 1960). This was the first movie shot in Vikram Studios, Madras. In the movie, Rajkumar sang a duet (Thumbithu Manava) as a playback singer for the first time.

== Cast ==
- Dr. Rajkumar as Mahishasura
- Sowcar Janaki as Gunavathi
- V. Nagayya as Shukracharya
- Udaykumar as Rambhesha
- Narasimharaju as Vyaaghrasimha
- K. S. Ashwath as Narada
- Rajanala
- Ganapathi Bhat
- Sandhya as Chamundeshwari
- T. D. Kusalakumari
- Suryakala
- Indrani as Goddess Durga
- M. Lakshmidevi
- Vasudeva Girimaji
- Hanumantha Rao
- Suryakumar
- Chi. Udayashankar as Vishnu
- Sadashivaiah
- Rajendra Krishna
- Y. N. S. Swamy
- Rangaswamy
- Papamma
- Shanthamma

Theatrical poster of the Telugu version

== Soundtrack ==
The music was composed by G. K. Venkatesh.

No.	Song	Singers	Lyrics	Length (m:ss)
1	"Gaganadali Mugilaneri"	S. Janaki	Chi. Sadaashiviah	03:02
2	"Jaya Jagadeeswari"		Chi. Sadaashiviah	02:35
3	"Sree Hari Muraari Chakradhaari"	P. B. Srinivas	Chi. Sadaashiviah	02:49
4	"Sri Hari Narayana Vanamaali"	P. B. Srinivas	Chi. Sadaashiviah	02:54
5	"Thumbithu Manava"	Rajkumar, S. Janaki	Chi. Sadaashiviah	03:26
