= Santha Thukaram =

- Directed by: Sundar Rao Nadkarni
- Written by: Chi. Udayashankar (dialogues)
- Produced by: B. Radhakrishna
- Starring: Rajkumar; Udaykumar; K. S. Ashwath; T. N. Balakrishna; Leelavathi; Rajasree
- Cinematography: D. V. Rajaram
- Edited by: Sundar Rao Nadakarni; P. K. Krishnan
- Music by: Vijaya Bhaskar
- Production company: Sri Ganesh Prasad Movies
- Distributed by: M/s. Vijaya Pictures Circuit
- Release date: 1963
- Country: India
- Language: Kannada

Santha Thukaram is a 1963 Indian Kannada language film directed by Sundar Rao Nadkarni and produced by B. Radhakrishna. The film stars Rajkumar and Leelavathi with Udaykumar, K. S. Ashwath and T. N. Balakrishna. The musical score was composed by Vijaya Bhaskar.

The film was awarded the National Film Award for Best Feature Film in Kannada at the 11th National Film Awards. It is based on the life of poet-saint Tukaram.

Chi. Udayashankar, who would go on to become one of the greatest lyricists in Kannada film industry, wrote the dialogues for this movie.

== Cast ==
- Rajkumar as Tukaram
- Leelavathi as Jija
- Udaykumar
- Rajasree as Menaka
- K. S. Ashwath
- Pandari Bai
- T. N. Balakrishna
- Baby Kala as Maada
- Baby Suma as Kashi
- C. V. Shivashankar
- P. Vadiraj
- H. R. Hanumantha Rao
- Sundar Rao
- H. Krishna Shastry
- Kupparaj
- Baby Kala as Maada
- Baby Suma as Kashi

== Soundtrack ==
The music was composed by Vijaya Bhaskar.

No.	Song	Singers	Lyrics	Length (m:ss)
1	"Elayya Manamohana"	P. Leela, L. R. Eswari	Chi. Sadashivaiah	06:04
2	"Pativrate Kurudalu"	P. B. Sreenivas	Chi. Sadashivaiah	02:15
3	"Aadi Bee Jaondene"	P. B. Sreenivas	Chi. Sadashivaiah	02:35
4	"Beda Krishna"	S. Janaki	Chi. Sadashivaiah	02:41
5	"Entha Karunanidhiyo"	P. B. Sreenivas	Chi. Sadashivaiah	01:16
6	"Horatesere Namma"	P. B. Sreenivas	Chi. Sadashivaiah	01:07
7	"Jayathu Jayavitala"	P. B. Sreenivas	Chi. Sadashivaiah	03:16
8	"Kivivarege Seledamba"	P. B. Sreenivas	Chi. Sadashivaiah	02:12
9	"Mareyade Sooryanu"	P. B. Sreenivas, S. Janaki	Chi. Sadashivaiah	03:59
10	"Pundaleekanigaagi"	P. B. Sreenivas	Chi. Sadashivaiah	02:23
11	"Sada Kanna Munde"	P. B. Sreenivas	Chi. Sadashivaiah	02:06
