= Naga Pooja =

1965 Indian Kannada film

- Directed by: D. S. Rajagopal
- Screenplay by: Geethapriya
- Produced by: A. S. Bhakthavathsalam; N. Geethadevi
- Starring: Rajkumar; Leelavathi; Rajasree; Raghavendra Rao; Rajendra Krishna; Hanumantha Rao
- Cinematography: K. Janakiram
- Edited by: P. Bhakthavathsalam
- Music by: T. G. Lingappa
- Production company: Maruthi Films
- Distributed by: Maruthi Films
- Release date: 1965
- Country: India
- Language: Kannada

Naga Pooja is a 1965 Indian Kannada-language film, directed by D. S. Rajagopal and produced by A. S. Bhakthavathsalam and N. Geethadevi. The film stars Rajkumar, Leelavathi, Raghavendra Rao, Rajendra Krishna and Hanumantha Rao. The film has musical score by T. G. Lingappa.

== Cast ==
- Rajkumar
- Raghavendra Rao
- Rajendra Krishna
- Hanumantha Rao
- Comedian Guggu
- Leelavathi
- Rajasree
- Papamma
- Geethadevi
- Shantha
- Shivaji Rao
- Thipatur Raghu
- Naresh
- Siddalingappa
- Balu
- Madan
- Bharathi
- Rama
- Revathi
- Lakshmi Rajyam

== Soundtrack ==
The music was composed by T. G. Lingappa and lyrics by Geetha Priya.

No.	Song	Singers	Length (m:ss)
1	"Baaramma Kamadhenu"	P. Susheela	03:13
2	"Belagisoo"	P. Susheela	06:04
3	"Kannada Naadinaa"	Nageshwara Rao	03:29
4	"Madhumaaya Chandrana"	P. B. Sreenivas	03:07
5	"Neethiya Meresi"	P. Susheela	03:06
6	"O Premada Poojaari"	L. R. Eswari	03:28
7	"Sei Sei Sei Ennuva"	L. R. Eswari	03:25
