= Dial 2244 =

- Directed by: R. M. Krishnaswamy
- Written by: Kalyanasundari; S. L. Puram Sadanandan (dialogues)
- Screenplay by: S. L. Puram Sadanandan
- Produced by: R. M. Krishnaswamy
- Starring: Prem Nazir; Sukumari; Adoor Bhasi; Rajasree
- Cinematography: Viswanath Roy
- Edited by: R. M. Venu
- Music by: G. K. Venkatesh
- Release date: 3 May 1968
- Country: India
- Language: Malayalam

Dial 2244 is a 1968 Indian Malayalam-language film, directed and produced by R. M. Krishnaswamy. The film stars Prem Nazir, Sukumari, Adoor Bhasi and Rajasree. The film had musical score by G. K. Venkatesh.

== Cast ==
- Prem Nazir
- Sukumari
- Adoor Bhasi
- Rajasree
- N. Govindankutty
- N. G. Menon
- Sachu
- Thodupuzha Radhakrishnan

== Soundtrack ==
The music was composed by G. K. Venkatesh and the lyrics were written by P. Bhaskaran.

No.	Song	Singers	Lyrics	Length (m:ss)
1	"Ayyayyo Azhakin"	L. R. Eeswari, Renuka	P. Bhaskaran	
2	"Jeevitha Kshethrathin"	A. P. Komala	P. Bhaskaran	
3	"Kandaalo Sundaran"	L. R. Eeswari	P. Bhaskaran	
4	"Mandaarapoovanathil"	Latha Raju, Renuka	P. Bhaskaran	
5	"Vaa Vaa Vaa Ennu Kannukal"	K. Jamuna Rani	P. Bhaskaran	
