= Sabash Satyam =

- Theatrical release poster
- Directed by: G. Viswanatham
- Produced by: M. D. Najem
- Starring: Krishna; Rajasree
- Cinematography: S. J. Thomas
- Edited by: B. S. Mani
- Music by: Sri Vijaya Krishnamurthy
- Distributed by: Purna Pictures
- Release date: 19 April 1969
- Running time: 168 mins
- Country: India
- Language: Telugu

Sabash Satyam (transl. Bravo Satyam) is a 1969 Indian Telugu-language science fiction film starring Krishna and Rajasree. The plot revolves around Satyam who falls in love with Chaya. When Satyam becomes invisible, he must find a way to become visible again and win his love.

== Plot ==
Satyam, who works at his uncle Dayanand's cancer research facility, falls in love with Dayanand's daughter Chaya, but her family has different plans for Chaya. Chaya's relatives set up a lab accident, and Satyam is turned invisible. Now Satyam must find a way to become visible again and win his love.

== Cast ==
- Krishna as Satyam
- Rajasree as Chaya
- Kaikala Satyanarayana as Dayanand, Satyam's uncle
- Vijaya Lalitha
- Nagabhushanam
- Rajababu
- M. Prabhakar Reddy

== Soundtrack ==
No.	Title	Lyrics	Singer(s)	Length
1.	"Nalo Ninnu Choodu"	Daasarathi Krishnamacharyulu	P. Susheela, S. P. Balasubrahmanyam	4:00
2.	"Mekola Mekola"	Daasarathi Krishnamacharyulu	P. Susheela	5:00
3.	"Itu Rave Rave Bangaru Chilakamma"	Kosaraju Raghavaiah	L. R. Eswari, A. L. Raghavan	2:35
4.	"Kalalu Nijalai Kanulu Varalai"	Aatreya	P. Susheela, S. P. Balasubrahmanyam	4:00
5.	"Ekkadiko Enduko Ee Parugu"	Aatreya	Ghantasala	5:00
6.	"Kalu Vesava Katu Vestanu"	Aatreya	P. Susheela	5:00
Total length:				25:35
