= Ide Mahasudina =

- Directed by: B. C. Srinivas
- Written by: B. C. Srinivas
- Produced by: Udayakumar; Dhanjee Kalyanjee
- Starring: Rajkumar; Udaykumar; Balakrishna; Raghavendra Rao
- Cinematography: Debri M. S. Mani
- Edited by: Kanda Swamy
- Music by: B. Gopal
- Production company: Shanth Films
- Distributed by: Shanth Films
- Release date: 16 September 1965
- Running time: 145 min
- Country: India
- Language: Kannada

Ide Mahasudina is a 1965 Indian Kannada-language film, directed by B. C. Srinivas and produced by Udaykumar and Dhanjee Kalyanjee. The film stars Rajkumar, Udaykumar, Balakrishna, and Raghavendra Rao. The film has musical score composed by B. Gopal. It was produced by actor Udaykumar: one of his initial film productions.

== Cast ==
- Rajkumar as Dr. Anand
- Udaykumar as Raja, Anand's brother
- Balakrishna
- B. Raghavendra Rao
- Leelavathi as Indira
- Harini as Radha
- M. Jayashree as Poornima, Anand and Raja's mother
- Dinesh as Ranga
- B. Jaya as Chenni, Ranga's wife
- H. P. Saroja
- Makeup Subbanna
- Comedian Guggu
- Narayan
- U. N. Simha
- Sampige Shankar
- Sanjeeva Rao
- Krishna Shastry
- Lakshmi
- Baby Vardhini
- Vijayabharathi
- Suryakumari
- Krishna
