= Bhagyavantha =

- Poster
- Directed by: B. S. Ranga
- Written by: B. S. Ranga
- Produced by: S. A. Govinda Raj; V. Bharath Raju
- Starring: Master Lohith; Jai Jagadish; Aarathi; K. S. Ashwath
- Cinematography: B. R. Ramkumar
- Edited by: P. G. Mohan
- Music by: T. G. Lingappa
- Production company: Nirupama Art Combines
- Release date: 1981
- Running time: 137 minutes
- Country: India
- Language: Kannada

Bhagyavantha is a 1981 Indian Kannada-language drama film directed and written by B. S. Ranga. The film featured Master Lohit, Aarathi and Jai Jagadish in pivotal roles. Veteran actor Rajkumar and Thoogudeepa Srinivas made brief appearances in the film.

The film is a remake of director's own 1954 Telugu film Maa Gopi which itself was a remake of 1953 Hindi film Bhagyawan and its Marathi version Soubhagya. The 1982 Hindi movie Anokha Bandhan based on the story Ramer Sumati by Sarat Chandra Chattopadhyay had a similar storyline except for the climax. The movie saw a theatrical run of 28 weeks.

The dialogues and lyrics were written by Chi. Udaya Shankar. Performance of Master Lohith were praised by critics and audience. The film featured original score and soundtrack composed by T. G. Lingappa. The soundtrack included two songs sung by actor Rajkumar.

== Plot ==
The movie stars and revolves around the life of Krishna (Puneeth Rajkumar) who is considered as an unlucky child and is shunned by most of his family members except his paternal uncle, his uncle's daughter and his brother's wife.

== Cast ==
- Puneeth Rajkumar as Krishna (credited as Master Lohit)
- Aarathi as Seeta, Krishna's sister-in-law
- Jai Jagadish as Ramu, Krishna's brother
- Rajkumar Guest appearance
- Sudharani as young Tara
- K. S. Ashwath
- Balakrishna
- Kanchana
- Thoogudeepa Srinivas as Train Loco pilot

== Soundtrack ==
The music was composed by T. G. Lingappa. However, the soundtrack included the very popular devotional song "Vaara Banthamma Guruvara Banthamma" sung by actor Rajkumar earlier for a private album for which music was scored by M. Ranga Rao but he was not credited in this movie. Puneeth Rajkumar made his singing debut with "Baana Daariyalli".

Track listing
| No. | Title | Lyrics | Singer(s) | Length |
|---|---|---|---|---|
| 1. | "Baana Daariyalli" | Chi. Udaya Shankar | Master Lohith |
| 2. | "Amma Seethamma" | Chi. Udaya Shankar | Poornachandra, Master Lohith |
| 3. | "Nagu Kanda" | Chi. Udaya Shankar | Kumari Jyothi |
| 4. | "Thilidavaro Moodaro" | Chi. Udaya Shankar | Rajkumar |
| 5. | "Guruvara Banthamma" | Chi. Udaya Shankar | Rajkumar |

== Legacy ==
Puneeth Rajkumar said that this is his favorite film as a child actor and that the song "Banadaariyalli Soorya Jaari Banda" is his favorite song sung by him. The song inspired a 2023 film of the same name.
