= Rajasree =

Indian actress

- Born: Kusuma Kumari; Eluru, Godavari District, Madras presidency. Now in Eluru, Eluru district, Andhra.
- Other names: Rajasri, Gracy, Rajasree T.
- Occupations: Actress, Classical dancer
- Years active: 1956–1979
- Spouse: Thota Panchajanyam (m. 1975; died 1983)
- Children: 1 son (b.1979)

Rajasree (Rajasree Thota Panchajanyam, Kusuma Kumari), also known as Rajasri or Rajashri, is an Indian actress who was active from 1956 to 1979. She is particularly famous for her portrayal as a princess in several folklore Telugu movies opposite N. T. Rama Rao and Tadepalli Lakshmi Kanta Rao and for acting alongside Ravichandran in the Tamil comedy films Neeyum Naanum, Kadhalikka Neram Illai and Delhi Mappilai. Notable among Rajasri's roles in non-folklore social films in Tamil are as Nimmi in the Tamil hit comedy film Kaadhalikka Neramillai, remade as Preminchi Choodu in Telugu, as movie star Bhama in Tamil film Bama Vijayam. She was credited as Gracy in the Malayalam movies she starred in her career since her debut film Bharya (1962), directed by Kunchako. Rajasree went on to do 200 films spread across the languages – Telugu, Tamil, Kannada, Malayalam (as Gracy) and Hindi from beginning of 1956 to 1979.

== Film industry ==
Rajsree first appeared as a child artiste in the Tamil film Naga Devadhai in 1956. She worked as child artiste in films like Bhaktha Ambarisha (1959) and Mangalyam (1960) in Telugu, Aasha Sundari (1960) in Kannada, Petraval Kanda Peruvazhvu (1960) and Baktha Sabari (1960) in Tamil. She debuted as a young heroin in Telugu film Nitya Kalyanam Paccha Thoranam in 1960 opposite another debutante hero Ramakrishna. She acted as the supporting young heroine with the Malayalam film Bharya (1962). Her character was named Gracy. With the success of her debut Malayalam film, Rajsree was always credited throughout her Malayalam film career as Gracy. Some of her famous Malayalam movies include Kadalamma (1963), Rebecca (1963), Pazhassi Raja (1964) and Shakuntala (1965). However, she was cast only as supporting and second lead actress in Tamil films like Sengamala Theevu (1962), Nichaya Thaamboolam (1962), Thendral Veesum (1962), Kalai Arasi (1963), Yarukku Sondham (1963) and Kattu Maina (1963) in the period 1962 to 1963. Her portrayal as the courtesean Madhavi in the film Poompuhar brought her new recognition as supporting actress in 1964. It was the film Kadhalikka Neram Illai in 1964, which made her a household name as the main lead heroine. She started receiving more Tamil films from 1964 onward.

However, she continued to be very selective as far as her choice of doing Malayalam movies was concerned. Her notable films in Malayalam as the lead heroine include Jail (1966), Kadamattathachan (1966), Anarkali (1966), Udhyogastha (1967), Karutha Rathrikal (1967), Kadal (1968), Dial 2244 (1968), Urangatha Sundary (1969), Sree Guruvayoorappan (1972), Sreemurukan and Devi Kanyaakumaari (1974). She did about 30 movies in Malayalam. Her last Malayalam film was Vishwaroopam (1978).

It was the Tamil comic classic, Kaadhalikka Neramillai, that catapulted Rajasree to national fame. She quoted in an interview "When I got a call from such a big banner as Chitralaya asking me to be present at the studio the next morning, I couldn't believe my ears. Many artistes had been considered for the role, I had heard. The song, "Anubavam Pudhumai", was the sequence that was shot first. They liked it and I did the film,". Rajasree went on to play the same role in Telugu with Akkini Nageswara Rao and in Hindi with Shashi Kapoor — she was the only one to repeat the role in the remakes. She quoted in interview "I remember Nagesh pulling my leg often shouting out "Dhigilazhagi" whenever I was on the sets,". Hence both during the shooting of Bama Vijayam and every time she met actor Nagesh, he would always call her as Dhiglazhagi as in the film, a thief refers to her by that name.

It was decided by Sridhar to remake Kadhallikaa Neram Illai in Hindi as Pyar Kiye Jaa and he retained only Rajasree from the original. Her debut Hindi film was a major box office hit in 1966. This led to her receiving films in Hindi as well. However, none of her four films in Hindi became a hit except for her debut Hindi film.

She made her heroine debut in Telugu films with Nitya Kalyanam Paccha Thoranam in 1960 opposite Hero Ramakrishna (Telugu actor) and Constable Kuthuru (1962) opposite Kanta Rao, but previously she had been already introduced as a child artist in Nagula Chavithi (1956). She was cast as the heroine of N. T. Rama Rao in films like Aggi Barata (1966), Pidugu Ramudu (1966), Aggi Veerudu (1969) and Chitti Chellelu (1969). Her pairing opposite actor Kanta Rao was a box office success. The pair Rajasree-Kanta Rao worked in Pakkalo Ballem (1965), Bangaru Timmaraju (1964), Saptaswaralu (1969), Pratigyna Palana (1966), Vijaya Simha (1965), Aggidora (1967), Bhoolokamlo Yamolokam (1966), Devudichchina Bharta (1968), Veera Pooja (1968), Ranabheri (1968), Aggimeeda Guggilam (1968), Oke Kutumbham (1970), Merupu Veerudu (1970), Maa Manchi Akkayya (1970), Prema Jeevulu, Bhale Ettu Chivaraku Chittu (1970) and Raite Raju (1970). They worked in another 10 movies where they were not paired opposite each other. She did about 76 films in Telugu. Her last film in Telugu was Andame Anandham (1977).

Her debut film in Kannada was Kantheredu Nodu (1961). The Kannada film Thejaswini, produced by M. Pandaribai, made Rajasree a popular in the Kannada film circle. She played second lead supporting roles in Kannada films like Swarna Gowri, Rathna Manjari, Karuneye Kutumbada Kannu and Chandra Kumara. She regularly starred in mythological period films like Santha Thukaram (1963), Shivarathri Mahathme and Shivagange Mahathme with either Rajkumar or Udaykumar or both. After achieving success in Tamil with Kadhalikka Neram Illai, she decided to do only lead heroine roles even in Kannada from 1964. Her Kannada films as lead heroine include Chandavalliya Thota, Satya Harishchandra (1965), Bala Nagamma (1966), Bhale Basava, Mr. Rajkumar (1970), Jwala Mohini, CID 72 and C.I.D. Rajanna. She was part of the cast in 14 films in Kannada with Rajkumar in the lead role. She did 30 films in Kannada with her last movie being Devadhasi (1978).

She went on to do comedy films as the lead heroine in Tamil to capitalize on her comic abilities like Bama Vijayam (1967), Anubavi Raja Anubavi (1967), Anubavam Pudhumai (1967), Neeyum Naanum (1968) and Delhi Mapillai (1968). These films have developed classic cult status over the years. She then went on to get the second lead heroine roles in films with M. G. Ramachandran in the lead, like Thaikku Thalaimagan (1967), Kudiyirundha Koyil (1968), Adimai Penn (1969), Pattikaattu Ponnaiya (1973), Netru Indru Naalai (1974) and Naalai Namadhe (1975). Her other notable films in Tamil include Kallum Kaniyagum, suspense thriller Selva Magal (1967), Siritha Mugam (1968), Patham Pasali (1970), Poi Sollathae (1971), Pattondru Ketten (1971), Yanai Valartha Vanampadi Magan, Amudha (1975) and Veeduvarai Uravu (1976). Her last film in Tamil was Iravu 12 Mani (1978). She did more than sixty films in Tamil.

== Personal life ==
Rajasree hails from a village in Eluru, Andhra Pradesh. She was born with a sister and her father was a railway station master. Rajasree was ten years old when she came to Chennai. She married Thota Panchajanyam in Hyderabad at 1977. Rajasree's husband died within few years after her marriage, when her child was four years old.

== Awards ==
- MGR Award - 2004
- Kalaimamani Award - 2012

== Partial filmography ==
In order of languages in which she acted the most to fewest films.

This list is incomplete; you can help by expanding it.

=== Telugu ===
1. Nagula Chavithi (1956) - Debut in Telugu (Child Artist)
2. Bhaktha Ambarisha (1959)
3. Nitya Kalyanam Paccha Thoranam (1960)
4. Sahasra Siracheda Apoorva Chintamani (1960) as Princess who imprisons Prathapa Simha
5. Mangalyam (1960)
6. Madana Kamaraju Katha (1962) as Mohana
7. Constable Koothuru (1962)
8. Dakshayagnam (1962)
9. Aradhana (1962)
10. Mahamantri Timmarusu (1962)
11. Aasa Jeevulu (1962)
12. Guruvunu Minchina Sishyudu (1963)
13. Babruvahana (1964)
14. Aggi Pidugu (1964)
15. Totalo Pilla Kotalo Raani (1964)
16. Bhaktha Ramadasu (1964)
17. Pooja Phalam (1964)
18. Bangaru Thimmaraju (1964)
19. Aakasaramanna (1965) as Chandravathi
20. Prameelarjuna Yuddham (1965)
21. Aatma Gowravam (1965)
22. Vijaya Simha (1965)
23. Manushulu Mamathalu (1965)
24. Preminchi Chudu (1965)
25. Mangamma Sapatham (1965)
26. Pakkalo Ballem (1965)
27. Aggi Barata (1966)
28. Loguttu Perumallakeruka (1966)
29. Bhimanjaneya Yuddham (1966)
30. Pidugu Raamudu (1966)
31. Bhulokamlo Yamalokam (1966)
32. Prathigna Palana (1966)
33. Rahasyam (1967)
34. Aggidora (1967)
35. Stree Janma (1967)
36. Kambojaraju Katha (1967)
37. Sri Sri Sri Maryada Ramanna (1967)
38. Raktha Sindhooram (1967)
39. Satyame Jayam (1967)
40. Veera Pooja (1967)
41. Govula Gopanna (1968)
42. Aggi Meeda Guggilam (1968) as Chandraprabha
43. Rajayogam (1968)
44. Ranabheri (1968)
45. Bhale Kodallu (1968)
46. Evaru Monagadu (1968) as Padma
47. Ukku Pidugu (1969) as Padmavathi Devi
48. Gopaludu Bhoopaludu (1969)
49. Sattekalapu Satteya (1969)
50. Sabash Satyam (1969)
51. Takkari Donga Chankkani Chukka (1969)
52. Devudichina Bhartha (1969) as Amruthavalli
53. Aggi Veerudu (1969)
54. Ukku Pidugu (1969)
55. Saptaswaralu (1969)
56. Gandara Gandadu (1969)
57. Chitti Chellelu (1970)
58. Evarini Nammali (1970)
59. Jhanmabhoomi (1970)
60. Okka Kutumbham (1970)
61. Raithe Raju (1970)
62. Lakshmi Kataksham (1970)
63. Maa Manchi Akkayya (1970)
64. Bale Etthu Chivariki Chitthu (1970)
65. Merupu Veerudu (1970)
66. Prema Jeevulu (1971)
67. Pattindalla Bangaram (1971) as Bharathi
68. Adavi Veerulu (1971)
69. Vikramarka Vijayam (1971)
70. Anuradha (1971) as Aruna
71. Bangaru Kutumbam (1971)
72. Kalavari Kutumbam (1972) as Kalpana
73. Atthanu Diddina Kodalu (1972)
74. Panjaramlo Pasipapa (1973)
75. Alluri Seetarama Raju (1974)
76. Intinti Katha (1974)
77. Sri Ramanjaneya Yuddham (1975)
78. Manushulanta Okkate (1976)
79. Andame Anandham (1977)
80. Daana Veera Soora Karna (1977)

=== Tamil ===
This list is incomplete; you can help by expanding it.

Year	Film	Role
1956	Naga Devathai	Child Artist (Debut in Tamil)
1960	Bhaktha Sabari	
1960	Petraval Kanda Peruvazhvu	
1961	Panam Panthiyile	Santha
1962	Nichaya Thaamboolam	Sarala
1962	Sengamala Theevu	Kanni
1962	Thendral Veesum	
1962	Neeya Naana?	
1963	Kaattumaina	
1963	Yarukku Sontham	Mallika
1963	Manthiri Kumaran	Rani
1963	Kalai Arasi	Princess Rajani
1963	Kubera Theevu	Vasanthi
1964	Kalai Kovil	Saroja
1964	Amma Engey	Bhuvana
1964	Magaley Un Samathu	Alli
1964	Nal Varavu	
1964	Nanum Manidhandhaan	
1964	Poompuhar	Madhavi
1964	Kaadhalikka Neramillai	Nirmala/Nimmi
1965	Neela Vanam	Vimala
1965	Vazhikaathi	Kamala
1965	Iru Thuruvam	Kamala
1965	Poomalai	Nalina
1966	Thayin Mel Aanai	Rathnamala
1967	Selva Magal	Saradha
1967	Anubavam Pudhumai	Vanitha
1967	Anubavi Raja Anubavi	Rajamani
1967	Bama Vijayam	Bama
1967	Thaikku Thalaimagan	Nalini
1968	Kudiyirundha Koyil	Asha
1968	Siritha Mugam	
1968	Delhi Mapillai	Gandhimathi
1968	Neeyum Naanum	
1968	Kallum Kaniyagum	Geetha
1969	Kumara Sambhavam	Urvasi
1969	Singapore Seeman	
1969	Avare En Deivam	
1969	Adimai Penn	Princess Muthazhagi
1969	Poova Thalaiya	Raji
1969	Ulagam Ivvalaudhan	Sumathi
1970	Patham Pasali	Radha
1970	Sorgam	Anjana
1970	Namma Veettu Deivam	
1971	Yanai Valartha Vanampadi Magan	Kamini
1971	Aathi Parasakthi	Lakshmi Devi
1971	Pattondru Ketten	
1971	Poi Sollathae	
1971	Needhi Dhevan	
1972	Ellai Kodu	Bhavani
1973	Pattikaattu Ponnaiya	Megala
1973	School Master	Ponggodi
1974	Akkarai Pachai	Usha
1974	Netru Indru Naalai	Amudha
1974	Pathu Matha Bandham	Mallika
1975	Amudha	Anbarasi
1975	Naalai Namadhe	Kamala
1975	Swami Ayyappan	
1976	Veeduvarai Uravu	Sophia
1978	Iravu 12 Mani	

=== Kannada ===
Year	Film	Role	Notes
1960	Aasha Sundari		
1960	Dashavathara		
1962	Thejaswini		
1962	Swarna Gowri		
1962	Rathna Manjari		
1962	Karuneye Kutumbada Kannu		
1962	Kantheredu Nodu		
1963	Santha Thukaram		
1963	Chandra Kumaara		
1964	Shivarathri Mahathme		
1964	Shivagange Mahathme		
1964	Chandavalliya Thota		
1965	Satya Harishchandra		
1965	Naagapooja		
1966	Bala Nagamma		
1968	Arunodaya		
1969	Gruhalakshmi		
1969	Bhale Basava		
1970	Sukha Samsaara		
1970	Mr. Rajkumar		
1970	C.I.D. Rajanna		
1970	Modala Rathri	Rajani	
1973	Jwala Mohini		
1973	CID 72		
1974	Urvashi		
1974	Mahadeshwara Pooja Phala		
1974	Mannina Magalu		
1975	Aashirvaada		
1975	Naaga Kanye		
1977	Shani Prabhava		
1978	Devadasi		

=== Malayalam: Credited as Gracy ===
Year	Film	Role	Notes
1962	Bharya	Gracy	Malayalam debut
1963	Kadalamma		
1963	Rebecca		
1964	Pazhassi Raja	Ammu Thampuratty	
1965	Shakuntala	Menaka	
1966	Jail		
1966	Kadamattathachan		
1966	Anarkali	Gulnar	
1967	Udhyogastha		
1967	Karutha Rathrikal		
1968	Kadal	Rajeena	
1968	Dial 2244		
1969	Kumara Sambhavam	Urvashi	
1969	Urangatha Sundary	Vilasini	
1970	Dathuputhran		
1971	Aana Valarthiya Vanampadiyude Makan		
1972	Sree Guruvayoorappan		
1973	Manassu		
1973	Ponnaapuram Kotta	Maalu	
1974	Devi Kanyaakumaari	Devaki	
1974	Durga	Latha	
1975	Raasaleela		
1975	Hotel Kaveri		
1977	Sreemurukan	Rajeswari	
1978	Vishwaroopam		

=== Hindi ===
Year	Film	Role	Notes
1966	Pyar Kiye Jaa	Nirmala "Nimmo"	Hindi Debut as Rajasree of South (Remake of Kadhalikka Neramillai)
1967	Nasihat		
1968	Payal Ki Jhankar	Kala	
1968	Mujrim Kaun?		
