= Dashavathara (film) =

- DVD cover
- Directed by: P. G. Mohan
- Screenplay by: G. V. Iyer
- Produced by: B. S. Ranga
- Starring: Rajkumar; Udaykumar; Rajashankar; Narasimharaju
- Cinematography: B. Dorairaj
- Edited by: P. G. Mohan; Devendranath
- Music by: G. K. Venkatesh
- Production company: Vikram Productions
- Distributed by: Vikram Productions
- Release date: 26 October 1960
- Running time: 175 min
- Country: India
- Language: Kannada

Dashavathara ( transl. The Ten Avatars) is a 1960 Indian Kannada-language film, directed by P. G. Mohan and produced by B. S. Ranga. The film stars Rajkumar, Udaykumar, Rajashankar and Narasimharaju. The film has a musical score by G. K. Venkatesh. This film's climax scene was shot in Eastmancolor.

== Cast ==
- Udaykumar as Kamsa
- Rajkumar as Jaya/Hiranyakashipu/Ravana/Shishupala
- Rajashankar as Vishnu and his avataras
- Narasimharaju as Rahu/Makaranda
- K. S. Ashwath
- H. R. Shastry as Dharmaraya
- Eshwarappa
- Veerabhadrappa
- H. K. Shastry
- A. V. Subba Rao
- M. Bhagavathar
- Srikanth
- Kashinath
- Varadaraj
- Kuppuraj
- Rathnakar
- Rajendrakrishna
- Ganapathi Bhat
- Keshavamurthy
- R. Srinivasan
- Girimaji
- Leelavathi as Mandodari/Droupadi
- Advani Lakshmi Devi as Seethe/Rukmini
- Rajasree
- M. Jayashree
- Saroja
- B. Jaya
- Papamma as Shabari
- Baby Suma
- Lakshmikantham
- Mala

== Production ==
The song "Godavaridevi Maunavaagi" is more popularly known as "Vaidehi Enadalo" since the opening words never repeat again in the song. BS Ranga, who planned to shoot a summary of Ramayana via a separate song with actress Jamuna as Seetha, had asked music director GK Venkatesh to check about the availability of actress Jamuna and to verify the status, he sent a telegram using minimal words - Vaidehi Enadalo (meaning what happened to Seetha). Impressed by the phrase, Venkatesh decided to incorporate it into the song's lyrics.

== Soundtrack ==
The music was composed by G. K. Venkatesh. The song "Vaidehi Enadalo" - which is in kandapadya style, is a rare instance in Indian cinema where a song is picturized on the character of Lord Rama singing for other character. Typically songs are picturized with other characters singing in praise of Rama.

No.	Song	Singers	Lyrics	Length (m:ss)
1	Vaidehi Yenadalo	P. B. Srinivas	G. V. Iyer	04:18
2	Onde Balliya hoovu	S. Janaki, A. P. Komala	G. V. Iyer	
3	Baare Radhike Kopa Ethake	L. R. Eswari (credited as Rajeshwari), S. Janaki, chorus	G. V. Iyer	
4	Keshava Maadhava Govinda	P. B. Srinivas	Purandara Dasa	03:50
