= Mahadeshwara Pooja Phala =

- Directed by: Sangram Singh
- Screenplay by: S. V. Rajendra Singh
- Produced by: S. V. Rajendra Singh
- Starring: Srinath; B. V. Radha; Ramadevi; T. N. Balakrishna; Rajasree
- Cinematography: M. R. K. Murthy
- Edited by: P. S. U. Maniyam
- Music by: Satyam
- Production company: Mahathma Productions
- Distributed by: Mahathma Productions
- Release date: 1 November 1974
- Country: India
- Language: Kannada

Mahadeshwara Pooja Phala is a 1975 Indian Kannada-language Hindu devotional drama film, directed by Sangram Singh and produced by S. V. Rajendra Singh. The film stars Srinath, B. V. Radha, Ramadevi, T. N. Balakrishna and Rajasree in the lead roles. The film has musical score by Satyam.

== Cast ==
- Srinath
- B. V. Radha
- Ramadevi
- T. N. Balakrishna
- Ramgopal
- Rajasree
- Rajanand
- Dwarakish
- B. Jaya
- Ambareesh
- Sangram
- Dikki Madhavarao
- Master Honnappa Bhagavathar
- C. D. Ramachandra
- Maccheri
- Ramaraje Urs
- Kamalamma
- Premakumari

== Soundtrack ==
The music was composed by Satyam with lyrics written by Chi. Udayashankar and R. N. Jayagopal.

No.	Song	Singers	Lyrics	Length (m:ss)
1	"Daye Thoru Mahadeswara"	Vani Jairam	Chi. Udaya Shankar	04:39
2	"Jaya Jaya Lokavana"	Ghantasala	R. N. Jayagopal	02:27
3	"Vishweswara Gangadhara"	Vani Jairam	Chi. Udaya Shankar	04:40
