= Hemavathi =

- Directed by: Siddalingaiah
- Written by: Hunasuru Krishnamurty (dialogues)
- Screenplay by: Siddalingaiah
- Story by: Goruru Ramaswamy Iyengar (Based on Novel)
- Produced by: N. Veeraswamy; S. P. Varadaraj; J. Chandulal Jain; Siddalingaiah
- Starring: G. V. Iyer; Udaykumar; C. H. Lokanath; Yoganarasimha, Srinivasa Murthy
- Cinematography: Srikanth
- Edited by: P. Bhakthavathsalam
- Music by: L. Vaidyanathan
- Production company: Jain Combines
- Distributed by: Jain Combines
- Release date: 2 September 1977
- Running time: 140 min
- Country: India
- Language: Kannada

Hemavathi is a 1977 Indian Kannada-language film directed by Siddalingaiah and produced by N. Veeraswamy, S. P. Varadappa, Chandulal Jain and Siddalingaiah. The film stars G. V. Iyer, Udaykumar, C. H. Lokanath, Srinivasa Murthy and Yoganarasimha.

== Cast ==
- G. V. Iyer
- Udaykumar
- Lokanath
- Gode Lakshminarayan
- Ashwini
- Shyamala
- Shashikala
- Sathyabhama

== Soundtrack ==
The music was composed by L. Vaidyanathan with lyrics penned by Chi. Udayashankar.

No.	Song	Singers	Lyrics	Length (m:ss)
1	"Maanavaro Neevu"	K. J. Yesudas	Chi. Udaya Shankar	06:16
2	"Shiva Shiva ennada"	S. Janaki	Chi. Udaya Shankar	04:01
3	"Guhanalli Sodara Vaatsalya"	P. B. Sreenivas	Chi. Udaya Shankar	06:10
4	"Shuddabrahma"	P. B. Sreenivas	Chi. Udaya Shankar	01:49
