= The Man Who Dared (1946 film) =

1946 film by John Sturges

- Directed by: John Sturges
- Written by: Edward Bock; Malcolm Stuart Boylan; Alex Gottlieb; Maxwell Shane
- Produced by: Leonard S. Picker
- Starring: George Macready; Forrest Tucker
- Cinematography: Philip Tannura
- Edited by: Charles Nelson
- Production company: Columbia Pictures
- Distributed by: Columbia Pictures
- Release date: May 30, 1946
- Running time: 66 minutes
- Country: United States
- Language: English
- Budget: less than $100,000

The Man Who Dared is a 1946 American film noir crime film directed by John Sturges, which serves as the first film he directed.

== Plot ==
It tells the story of a reporter who concocts a false case so as to get himself convicted for first degree murder. He does this to prove that a death sentence could be erroneously issued based on circumstantial and flawed evidence and that the death penalty should be abolished.

== Cast ==
- Leslie Brooks as Lorna Claibourne
- George Macready as Donald Wayne
- Forrest Tucker as Larry James
- Charles D. Brown as Dist. Atty. Darrell Tyson
- Warren Mills as Felix
- Richard Hale as Reginald Fogg
- Charles Evans as Judge
- Trevor Bardette as Police Sgt. Arthur Landis
- William Newell as Police Sgt. Clay

== Movies with similar themes ==
- Beyond a Reasonable Doubt (1956)
- Bidugade (1973)
- Abhilasha (1983)
- The Life of David Gale (2003)

== See also ==
- Wrongful execution
