= Rajashekara =

- Directed by: G. V. Iyer
- Screenplay by: G. V. Iyer
- Story by: B. S. Ranga
- Produced by: B. S. Ranga
- Starring: Rajkumar; Bharathi Vishnuvardhan; Udaykumar; Balakrishna; Narasimharaju
- Cinematography: B. N. Haridas
- Edited by: P. G. Mohan; Devendranath; Chakrapani
- Music by: G. K. Venkatesh
- Production company: Vasanth Pictures
- Distributed by: Vasanth Pictures
- Release date: 17 May 1967
- Running time: 173 min
- Country: India
- Language: Kannada

Rajashekara is a 1967 Indian Kannada-language film, directed by G. V. Iyer and produced by B. S. Ranga. The film stars Rajkumar, Bharathi Vishnuvardhan, Udaykumar, Balakrishna and Narasimharaju. The musical score was composed by G. K. Venkatesh.

== Cast ==
- Rajkumar as Shekharavarma
- Udaykumar as Jagamalla
- Bharathi Vishnuvardhan as Mangala
- Balakrishna as Vijayavarma
- Narasimharaju as Veeravarma
- B. M. Venkatesh as Raja
- Vandana as Pankajavalli
- R. T. Rama as Singaravalli
- Ramadevi as Alankaravalli
- Papamma as Aaramavalli
- Kupparaj
- Raghavendra Rao
- Dinesh
- Shyam
- Maccheri
