= Simha Swapna =

- Directed by: W. R. Subba Rao
- Written by: S. Bhavanarayan
- Produced by: S. Bhavanarayan
- Starring: Rajkumar; Udaykumar; Narasimharaju; Dikki Madhavarao
- Cinematography: W. R. Subba Rao
- Edited by: R. Hanumantha Rao
- Production company: Gowri Productions
- Distributed by: Gowri Productions
- Release date: 14 October 1968
- Running time: 133 min
- Country: India
- Language: Kannada

Simha Swapna is a 1968 Indian Kannada-language swashbuckler film directed by W. R. Subba Rao and produced by S. Bhavanarayan. The film stars Rajkumar, Udaykumar, Narasimharaju and Dikki Madhavarao. The film has musical score by G. K. Venkatesh. This is the only film in which Rajkumar lip-synced to the voices of T. M. Soundararajan and Pithapuram Nageswara Rao.

== Cast ==
- Rajkumar
- Udaykumar
- Narasimharaju
- Dikki Madhavarao
- Dinesh
- Raghavendra Rao
- Hanumanthachar
- Rathnakar
- Jayanthi
- B. V. Radha
- Sadhana
- Ramadevi
- Jyothilakshmi

== Soundtrack ==
The music was composed by Dakshinamoorthy.

No.	Song	Singers	Lyrics	Length (m:ss)
1	"Angaile Aagasa Thoro"	Madhavapeddi Satyam, S. Janaki	Chi. Udaya Shankar	03:20
2	"Olle Olle Huli Uguru"	Pithapuram Nageswara Rao	Chi. Udayashankar	
2	"Raajara Mahalinali"	T. M. Soundararajan	Hunsur Krishnamurthy	02:59
