= C.I.D. Rajanna =

1970 film

- Directed by: R. Ramamurthy
- Written by: Kottarakara
- Screenplay by: V. Somanathan
- Produced by: R. Ramamurthy
- Starring: Rajkumar; Rajasree; Premalatha
- Cinematography: B. Dorairaj
- Edited by: R. Ramamurthy
- Music by: Satyam
- Distributed by: Shri Rama Enterprise
- Release date: 23 September 1970
- Running time: 149 minutes
- Country: India
- Language: Kannada

C.I.D. Rajanna is a 1970 Indian Kannada-language film produced and directed by R. Ramamurthy, starring Rajkumar. The supporting cast includes Rajasree, Premalatha, Dinesh, Ranga, Dwarakish and K.S. Ashwath. S.P. Balasubrahmanyam sang for Rajkumar for the song "Illi aaduva maatu Kannada" which was his third and last lip sync song for Rajkumar after the two songs in Mr. Rajkumar which was released few months before this movie.

== Cast ==
- Rajkumar as Rajanna
- Rajasree
- Premalatha
- Dinesh
- Ranga
- Dwarakish as Mallanna
- Kanchana
- K. S. Ashwath

== Soundtrack ==
The music was composed by Satyam with lyrics by Chi. Udaya Shankar.

=== Track list ===
#	Title	Singer(s)
1	"Yaavurappa Ninna Hesarenappa"	P. B. Sreenivas, S. Janaki
2	"Nannaleno Hosa Baavane"	P. Susheela, P. B. Sreenivas, S. P. Balasubrahmanyam
3	"Nee Baluki Baluki Nadevaaga"	P. B. Sreenivas
4	"Illi Aduva Maathu Kannada"	S. P. Balasubrahmanyam
5	"Amma Thaaye Amma Thaaye"	P. B. Sreenivas
