= Pattikaattu Ponnaiya =

- Theatrical release poster
- Directed by: B. S. Ranga
- Story by: Shyamala (Devi)
- Produced by: B. S. Ranga
- Starring: M. G. Ramachandran; Jayalalithaa; Rajasree
- Cinematography: B. N. Haridas
- Edited by: V. Chakrapani; M. Devandranath
- Music by: K. V. Mahadevan
- Production company: Vasanth Pictures
- Release date: 10 August 1973
- Running time: 138 minutes
- Country: India
- Language: Tamil

Pattikaattu Ponnaiya (transl. Rural man Ponnaiya) is a 1973 Indian Tamil-language film, directed by B. S. Ranga. The film stars M. G. Ramachandran, Jayalalithaa and Rajasree. It was the last film to feature Ramachandran and Jayalalithaa together. The film was released on 10 August 1973.

== Plot ==
Ponnaiya is a farmer and the son of a farmer. His father owes money to Pannaiyar Paramasivam and he is given time to return the money or else he would lose his father who would not live if he loses his respect. He leaves his lover Kannama and comes to the city to make money. There, he fights and saves Singhaiya, a wrestler trainer. He joins under his tutelage, learns fighting and decides to join a tournament. Kannama initially comes in to marry him but understanding the situation supports him.

He reaches the tournament finals where he faces a master fighter who is revealed to be Muthaiya, his long-lost younger twin who is also in desperate need of money. How the two brothers join hands and solve both their problems is the rest of the story.

== Cast ==
- M. G. Ramachandran as Ponnaiya and Muthaiya
- Jayalalithaa as Kannamma, Ponnaiya's lover
- Rajasree as Megala, Muthaiya's lover
- M. N. Nambiar as Pannaiyar Paramasivam
- S. A. Ashokan as Master-wrestler Singhaiya
- Nagesh as Murugan, Chinna Pannaiyar
- V. K. Ramasamy as Major Vaithiyalingam Megala Father
- V. Nagayya as Nattamai Nallasivam, father of Ponnaiya and Muthaiya
- Thengai Srinivasan as Lossu Subbu
- Usharani as Kaveri, young sister of Ponnaiya and Muthaiya
- S. N. Lakshmi as Meenakshi, Nattamai Nallasivam 's wife
- Gandhimathi as Master-wrestler Singhaiya's wife
- A. Veerappan as Singhaiya's assistant
- Pandu as Cyclist
- M. S. Sundari Bai as Paravatham, the Major Vaithiyalingam 's wife
- S. Rama Rao as Rajapart Rangadurai, Kannamma Father
- Shabnam as dancer
- Vijayachandrika as Murugan's lover

== Production ==
Pattikaattu Ponnaiya was the last film to feature M. G. Ramachandran and Jayalalithaa together. Sahul served as stunt double for Ramachandran in a boxing scene.

== Soundtrack ==
The music was composed by K. V. Mahadevan.

Song	Singers	Lyricist	Length
"Yeh Machan"	T. M. Soundararajan & P. Susheela	Kannadasan	03:17
"Oru Varusham"	T. M. Soundararajan & P. Susheela	Kannadasan	03:16
"Iravugalai Paatha"	S. P. Balasubrahmanyam & S. Janaki	Kannadasan	03:24
"Dididi Saathukudi"	L. R. Eswari (with dialogues)	Pulamaipithan	03:24
"Pattupola Ponnai"	P. Susheela	Kannadasan	03:17
