= Seethe Alla Savithri =

- Directed by: P. Vadiraj-Jawahar
- Written by: P. Vadiraj; Dialogues: Sorat Ashwath; Lyrics: R. N. Jayagopal; Vijayanarasimha
- Screenplay by: P. Vadiraj
- Produced by: Jawahar; K. Sampathraj
- Starring: Vishnuvardhan; Jayalakshmi; Udaya Chandrika; Ambareesh; Balakrishna; Nagaraj; Mukesh
- Cinematography: R. N. K. Prasad
- Edited by: K. L. Narayana Rao
- Music by: Vijaya Bhaskar
- Production company: Vijaya Bharathi
- Release date: 25 July 1973
- Running time: 127 minutes
- Country: India
- Language: Kannada

Seethe Alla Savithri is a 1973 Indian Kannada family film directed by Jawahar and P. Vadiraj starring Vishnuvardhan. The film was produced by renowned comedian and reputed Kannada producer P. Vadiraj through his production company Vijaya Bharathi. It is a remake of Tamil film Komatha En Kulamatha.

== Cast ==
- Vishnuvardhan as Shankara
- Ambareesh
- Jayalakshmi
- Udaya Chandrika
- Balakrishna
- Shringar Nagaraj
- H. R. Shastry
- M. N. Lakshmi Devi
- Kalavathi
- Advani Lakshmi Devi

== Soundtrack ==
1. "Dum Dum Baarisu Nagaari"
2. "Thaarunya Thandide Bhaara" – singer: S. Janaki
3. "Samaagama Manorama" – singer: P. B. Sreenivas, lyrics: R. N. Jayagopal
4. "Balleya Iniya Balleya"
5. "Devi Aatagaathiyu Neenu" – singer: P. B. Sreenivas, S. Janaki, lyrics: R. N. Jayagopal
