= Sidila Mari =

- Directed by: B. S. Ranga
- Written by: Shyamala Devi
- Screenplay by: G. Balasubramanyam
- Produced by: B. S. Ranga
- Starring: Udaykumar; K. S. Ashwath; Dinesh; Dwarakish
- Cinematography: B N Haridas
- Edited by: M Devendranath; Chakrapani
- Music by: S. Rajeshwara Rao
- Production company: Vikas Productions
- Distributed by: Vikas Productions
- Release date: 19 January 1971
- Running time: 131 min
- Country: India
- Language: Kannada

Sidila Mari is a 1971 Indian Kannada film, directed and produced by B. S. Ranga. The film stars Udaykumar, K. S. Ashwath, Dinesh and Dwarakish in lead roles. The musical score was composed by S. Rajeshwara Rao.

== Cast ==
- Udaykumar
- K. S. Ashwath
- Dinesh
- Dwarakish
- Rajanand
- Nagesh
- Maccheri
- B. Raghavendra Rao
- H.R. Shastry
- Shyam
- Aras
- Premier Srinivas
- Baby Balaraju
- Jayanthi
- Sadhana
- Surekha
- Vijayalalitha
