= Kiladi Ranga =

- VCD cover
- Directed by: G. V. Iyer
- Written by: Sadashiva Brahmam; Chi Sadashivaiah; G. V. Iyer
- Screenplay by: Sadashiva Brahmam; Chi Sadashivaiah; G. V. Iyer
- Produced by: B. S. Ranga
- Starring: Rajkumar; Jayanthi; M. P. Shankar; Narasimharaju
- Cinematography: B. N. Haridas
- Edited by: P. G. Mohan
- Music by: G. K. Venkatesh
- Production company: Vasantha Pictures
- Release date: 1966
- Country: India
- Language: Kannada

Kiladi Ranga is a 1966 Indian Kannada-language film, directed by G. V. Iyer and produced by B. S. Ranga. The film stars Rajkumar, Jayanthi, M. P. Shankar and Narasimharaju. The film has musical score by G. K. Venkatesh. The movie is based on the 1894 novel The Prisoner of Zenda by Anthony Hope, which was also later adapted in Hindi in 2015 as Prem Ratan Dhan Payo.

== Cast ==
- Rajkumar
- Jayanthi
- M. P. Shankar
- Narasimharaju
- B. Jayashree
- B. V. Radha
- Raghavendra Rao
- Dinesh
- Bangalore Nagesh

== Soundtrack ==
The music was composed by G. K. Venkatesh.

No.	Song	Singers	Lyrics	Length (m:ss)
1	"Yaarige Mudi"	S. Janaki	G. V. Iyer	03:11
