= Suli (1978 film) =

- Directed by: B. S. Ranga
- Written by: Chi. Udaya Shankar (dialogues)
- Screenplay by: Shankar-Sundar
- Story by: Savanthri by Krishnamurthy Puranik
- Produced by: B. S. Ranga
- Starring: Lokesh; Ashok; Ramakrishna; M. S. Sathya
- Cinematography: B. N. Haridas
- Edited by: Chakrapani
- Music by: Upendra Kumar
- Production company: Vikram Productions
- Distributed by: Vikram Productions
- Release date: 17 June 1978
- Running time: 137 minutes
- Country: India
- Language: Kannada

Suli ( transl. Whirl) is a 1978 Indian Kannada-language film, produced and directed by B. S. Ranga. The film stars Lokesh, Ashok, Ramakrishna and M. S. Sathya. The film has musical score by Upendra Kumar.

== Cast ==
- Lokesh
- Ashok as Cheluva
- Ramakrishna as Thimma
- M. S. Sathya
- Nimbalkar
- L. R. Ananth
- Shani Mahadevappa
- Shivaprakash
- B. Prakash
- Jr. Mahadev
- Master Raja
- Chandrakala as Savithri
- Susheela Naidu
- Papamma as Sathajji
- Jr. Bharathi
- Shantha Prakash
- Indiradevi

== Soundtrack ==
The music was composed by Upendra Kumar with lyrics written by Chi. Udayashankar for all songs except one.

No.	Song	Singers	Lyrics	Length (m:ss)
1	"Mella Mellane Bandane"	Kasturi Shankar	Purandaradasa	03:09
