= Bidugade =

- Directed by: Y. R. Swamy
- Written by: Ramesh Movies
- Screenplay by: Ramesh Movies
- Produced by: T. P. Venugopal
- Starring: Rajkumar; Bharathi; Rajesh; K. S. Ashwath
- Cinematography: Annayya
- Edited by: Babu; N. C. Rajan
- Music by: M. Ranga Rao
- Production company: Ramesh Movies
- Release date: 1973
- Running time: 175 minutes
- Country: India
- Language: Kannada

Bidugade is a 1973 Indian Kannada language drama film directed by Y. R. Swamy and produced by T. P. Venugopal. It starred Rajkumar, Rajesh and Bharathi along with a host of supporting actors. Minugutare Kalpana made a special appearance in the film. M. Ranga Rao scored the music and the story was written and produced by Ramesh Movies. Chi. Udaya Shankar wrote the lyrics and dialogues. The cinematography by Annayya won him the Karnataka State Film Award for Best Cinematographer award.

The core plot of the movie is based on a short story which had earlier been an inspiration for two English movies – the 1946 movie The Man Who Dared and the 1956 movie Beyond a Reasonable Doubt. The 1983 Telugu movie Abhilasha, in spite of being based on the Telugu novel of same name, was reported to be similar to these movies.

The movie is also noticeable for showing Rangeet River as a border between India and Sikkim "country" which was true at the time of release of the movie since Sikkim became a part of India only in 1975.

== Theme ==
The movie questions the need for capital punishment and confronts it from the perspective of the innocent victims trapped by the system's incompetence.

== Plot ==
The movie is about a reporter who concocts a false case so as to get himself convicted for first degree murder so that he can prove that the death sentence can be given based on circumstantial evidence and that it be done away with. However, by the time he is out of the prison proving his innocence, his father is falsely arrested in another murder case and is awarded a death penalty!

== Cast ==
- Rajkumar as M. B. Shekhar
- Bharathi as Shobha
- Kalpana as Mala (Special appearance)
- Rajesh as Somnath, Shekhar's friend
- Sampath as Sadashiva Rao, Shobha's father
- T. N. Balakrishna as Subba Rao
- Narasimharaju as Kapinipathi Rao
- K. S. Ashwath as Bhyrappa, Shekhar's father
- Vajramuni as Gopal, CID Inspector
- Thoogudeepa Srinivas as Muniya, labourer
- Shakti Prasad as jail superintendent
- Dinesh as Devappa, owner of the coffee plantations
- M. Jayashree as Mala's mother
- Vijaya Lalitha as Rekha, Mala's sister
- Shani Mahadevappa as Thammayya, labourer

== Soundtrack ==
The music of the film was composed by M. Ranga Rao and the lyrics were written by Chi. Udaya Shankar.

=== Track list ===
#	Title	Singer(s)	Length
1	"Bedagina Henna"	P. Susheela, P. B. Sreenivas	06:06
2	"Baanige Neeliya"	P. Susheela, P. B. Sreenivas	05:38
3	"Ninneyo Mugida Kathe"	S. Janaki	03:27
4	"Nanna Putta Samsara"	P. Susheela	03:26
5	"Bedagina Henna"	P. Susheela & chorus	03:26

== Reception ==
According film historian K. Puttaswamy, this was the first Kannada film that had its ending changed, as the audiences disliked the tragic climax.

== See also ==
- Kannada films of 1973
- Abhilasha
- The Man Who Dared
- Beyond a Reasonable Doubt
