= Mr. Rajkumar =

- Directed by: B. S. Ranga
- Written by: Chi. Udaya Shankar (dialogues)
- Screenplay by: G. Balasubramanyam
- Story by: G. Balasubramanyam
- Produced by: B. S. Ranga
- Starring: Rajkumar; Rajasree; Nagappa; Dwarakish; Raghavendra Rao
- Cinematography: B. N. Haridas
- Edited by: P. G. Mohan
- Music by: S. Rajeshwara Rao
- Production company: Vikram Productions
- Distributed by: Vikram Productions
- Release date: 10 August 1970
- Running time: 136 min
- Country: India
- Language: Kannada

Mr. Rajkumar is a 1970 Indian Kannada-language film directed and produced by B. S. Ranga. It stars Rajkumar, Rajasree, Nagappa, Dwarakish and Raghavendra Rao. The film has musical score by S. Rajeshwara Rao. S. P. Balasubrahmanyam lent his voice for the first time to Rajkumar in this movie. He lent his voice to Rajkumar in two lip sync songs in the movie. He went on to do it for one last time in C.I.D. Rajanna which released in the same year. This was also Rajkumar's first full- fledged colour movie in the social drama genre and second overall after Sri Krishnadevaraya which also released in the same year.

== Plot ==
After completing his 6-month education course in America, Kumar returns to India with his younger sister Latha. Kumar who is the proprietor of a profitable Sugar Factory aims to bridge the gap between the rich and the poor due to which he decides to work as one among them. His loyal servant Ramarayaru puts forward a proposal. Kumar falls in love with that girl, Saroja, daughter of a wealthy, Shyaamarayaru, but not before pledging to quell the arrogance of her illiterate mother, Radhabai.

He wins Saroja's heart by posing as Driver Raja and then pretends as a flirtatious and crooked Kumar to test the love of Saroja. When he learns that she wholeheartedly loves the Driver Raja, he reveals the truth to her and her father's role in the play. Saroja pretends to be pregnant with Kumar's son, a claim refuted by Kumar, forcing Radhabai to conduct the marriage of Raja and Saroja. Later Kumar reveals the entire story to Radhabai who accepts it.

Meanwhile, Shekhar, the good for nothing brother of Kumar who has taken to drinking and gambling is used by a crooked Nagappa to exhort money. Nagappa later woos Latha, Kumar's younger sister. Property disputes soon crops up in Kumar's house causing him to transfer the entire property to his siblings' name. This enrages Radhabai who prevents Saroja from moving out with Kumar.

Kumar travels to the nearby village which is plagued by alcoholism. He not only reforms the people but also manages to make it big in the field of agriculture with their help earning the honorary title of Annavru. Nagappa uses Latha's money to enjoy life while Shekhar falls for Mala. Kumar takes the identity of Farooq Baba to warn and guide his siblings but fails miserably. Saroja, meanwhile, returns to Kumar and stays with him in the village in a hut. Latha's marriage with Nagappa is opposed by Mala who teases him to be a money hungry person. This forces Latha to transfer her wealth to Shekhar to prove that Nagappa would still accept her and is not behind her wealth. Shekhar in turn transfers the entire property to Mala in a hurry to show his love towards Mala. But, Mala kicks Shekhar out of the house.

Nagappa leaves Latha after coming to know she is penniless. Kumar in the guise of Farooq Baba takes her to Ramaraya's house. Nagappa kidnaps Saroja for a ransom of 10 lakhs. Kumar saves her and unites with his siblings. It is then revealed that Mala is Kumar's secretary who was sent by Kumar himself to take care of the property in the guise of being a lover to Shekhar so that Shekhar does not fall prey to any one else with evil intentions. She returns the property papers to Kumar and Kumar decides to get Shekhar married to Mala. Kumar and Saroja leave after handing over the entire property to Shekhar. When Shekhar expresses his inability to manage the factory and asks Kumar to stay with him, Kumar refuses to stay. He further announces that the ownership of the factory would belong to every employee working there and proceeds to move towards village life along with his wife.

== Cast ==
- Rajkumar as Mr.Raj/Kumar/Farooq Baba
- Rajasree as Saroja
- Nagappa as Nagappa
- Dwarakish as Shekhar
- Raghavendra Rao as Ramarayaru
- Mahadevaiah
- Bangalore Nagesh
- Narayan Rao
- Shyam
- Mallesh
- Jr. Revathi
- Ramadevi as Radhabai
- Manimala
- Saraswathi

== Soundtrack ==
The music was composed by Rajeswara Rao.

| No. | Song | Singers | Lyrics | Length (m:ss) | Note |
|---|---|---|---|---|---|
| 1 | "Balliyondu" | P. B. Sreenivas | Chi. Udaya Shankar | 03:01 | |
| 2 | "Gangi Ninmele" | P. B. Sreenivas, S. Janaki | Chi. Udaya Shankar | 03:41 | |
| 3 | "I Love You" | S. P. Balasubrahmanyam | Chi. Udaya Shankar | 02:56 | Picturized on Dwarkish |
| 4 | "Kudiyona Baa Kuniyona Baa" | P. B. Sreenivas | Chi. Udaya Shankar | 03:53 | |
| 5 | "Unte Unte Ammayya" | S. P. Balasubrahmanyam | Chi. Udaya Shankar | 03:53 | Picturized on Rajkumar |
| 6 | "Ba Ba Ba Bangalore" | S. P. Balasubrahmanyam | | | Picturized on Rajkumar |
| 7 | "Roja Ennu Gulaabi Ennu" | | | 03:39 | Title Song |
