= Sedige Sedu =

- Directed by: A. V. Sheshagiri Rao
- Written by: A. L. A. Naidu
- Screenplay by: A. V. Sheshagiri Rao
- Produced by: K. Krishnaiah Naidu
- Starring: Udaykumar; Jayanthi; T. N. Balakrishna; Narasimharaju
- Cinematography: K. S. Mani
- Edited by: P. Bhakthavatsalam
- Music by: Satyam
- Production company: Madhu Balaji Combines
- Release date: 1970
- Running time: 158 minutes
- Country: India
- Language: Kannada

Sedige Sedu is a 1970 Indian Kannada-language film, directed by A. V. Sheshagiri Rao and produced by K. Krishnaiah Naidu. The film stars Udaykumar, Jayanthi, T. N. Balakrishna and Narasimharaju in the lead roles. The musical score was composed by Satyam.

== Cast ==
- Udaykumar as Ranga
- Jayanthi as Shanti
- T. N. Balakrishna as Sitapathi
- Narasimharaju
- Nagappa
- Rajanand
- Papamma
- R. T. Rama as Nagu
- Vijayalalitha
- Vijayaprabha

== Soundtrack ==
Sedige Sedu

Soundtrack album by Satyam
- Genre: Feature film soundtrack
- Language: Kannada
- Label: Saregama

The music for the film and its soundtrack was composed by Satyam.

All lyrics are written by Chi. Udayashankar.

Track listing
No.	Title	Singer(s)	Length
1.	"Nanjangudina Nanjundappa"	P. B. Sreenivas
2.	"Muddu Maava Nidde Baradu"	L. R. Eswari
3.	"Neeneke Koraguve"	S. P. Balasubrahmanyam
4.	"Balina Balliyalli Aralida"	S. Janaki
