= Nata Sarvabhouma =

1968 film

- Directed by: Aaruru Pattabhi
- Produced by: U. S. Rajaram; B. K. Hasan Sharief; K. A. Gopal; R. Laxman
- Starring: Rajkumar
- Cinematography: Janaki Ram
- Edited by: Bhaktavatsalam
- Music by: Vijaya Bhaskar
- Release date: 1968
- Country: India
- Language: Kannada

Nata Sarvabhouma is a 1968 documentary film on Rajkumar directed by Aaruru Pattabhi. It was made coinciding the occasion of the release of his 100th film Bhagyada Bagilu. The documentary introduced Rajkumar's village, home, family members and also contained clippings of some of his films. It also has the footage of his felicitation by Gubbi Veeranna and conferring him the title "Nata Sarvabhouma".

== Felicitation ==
Procession at the Narasimharaja road moving towards Kanteerava Stadium

On the morning of Sunday, 23 July 1968, the procession in Bangalore started from the Mysore Bank circle, Kempegowda Road with thousands of fans chanting "Rajkumararige Jayavaagali" ("All hail Rajkumar"). Rajkumar was accompanied by his contemporaries and popular actors like Kalyan Kumar, Narasimharaju and Balakrishna among others. Popular actresses Kalpana, Pandari Bai and Bharathi were also present. Rajkumar was then felicitated at the Kanteerava Stadium for having successfully completed 100 films as an actor by Kannada cinema's popular actor and theatre director Gubbi Veeranna conferring him the title Nata Sarvabhouma in front of thousands of fans.
