= CID 72 =

- Directed by: K. S. L. Swamy
- Produced by: D. R. Naidu
- Starring: Srinath; Rajasree; Rajesh; B. V. Radha
- Cinematography: P. S. Prakash
- Music by: Vijaya Bhaskar
- Release date: 1973
- Country: India
- Language: Kannada

CID 72 (Kannada: ಸಿ.ಐ.ಡಿ.೭೨) is a 1973 Indian Kannada film, directed by K. S. L. Swamy and produced by D. R. Naidu. The film stars Srinath, Rajasree, Rajesh and B. V. Radha. The film has musical score by Vijaya Bhaskar.

== Cast ==
- Srinath
- Rajasree
- Rajesh
- B. V. Radha
- Thoogudeepa Srinivas
- Dwarakish

== Soundtrack ==
The music was composed by Vijaya Bhaskar.

No.	Song	Singers	Lyrics	Length (m:ss)
1	"Heegay Iruva Haayagiruva"	P. B. Sreenivas, P. Susheela	Chi. Udaya Shankar	03:11
