= Choori Chikkanna =

- Directed by: R. Ramamurthy
- Written by: K. P. Kottarakkara
- Produced by: R. Ramamurthy
- Starring: Rajkumar; Narasimharaju; Dinesh; K. S. Ashwath
- Cinematography: B. Dorairaj
- Edited by: R. Ramamurthy
- Music by: Satyam
- Production company: Sri Rama Enterprises
- Distributed by: Sri Rama Enterprises
- Release date: 26 May 1969
- Running time: 153 minutes
- Country: India
- Language: Kannada

Choori Chikkanna is a 1969 Indian Kannada-language film, directed by R. Ramamurthy and produced by R. Ramamurthy. The film stars Rajkumar, Narasimharaju, Dinesh and K. S. Ashwath. The film has musical score by Satyam.

== Cast ==
- Dr. Rajkumar as Chikkanna/Bhaskar
- Narasimharaju as Gopala
- Dinesh as Rajashekhar/Java Seth
- K. S. Ashwath as Krishnaraja
- Nagappa
- Keshavamurthy
- Ganapathi Bhat
- B. Narayana Rao
- Srikantaswamy
- Joker Shyam
- Judo Rathnam
- Jippi Krishna
- Ramamurthy
- Jayanthi as Vasantha
- B. V. Radha
- Jayakumari
- Vijayalalitha

== Soundtrack ==
The music was composed by Satyam.

No.	Song	Singers	Lyrics	Length (m:ss)
1	"Kele Kele Nanna Kathe Heluve"	P. B. Sreenivas, Rathnakar	Chi. Udaya Shankar	04:44
2	"Nee Modalu Modalu"	S. P. Balasubrahmanyam, Bangalore Latha	Chi. Udaya Shankar	03:15
3	"Cycle Mele Banda"	S. Janaki, L. R. Eswari	Chi. Udaya Shankar	02:42
4	"Karaneri Banda"	P. B. Sreenivas	Chi. Udaya Shankar	02:32
5	"Madayya Bandeya"	L. R. Eswari	Chi. Udaya Shankar	03:48
6	"Mellage Nade Mellage"	P. B. Sreenivas	Chi. Udaya Shankar	03:31
