= Nichaya Thamboolam =

1962 film by B. S. Ranga

- Theatrical release poster
- Directed by: B. S. Ranga
- Written by: 'Virudai' Ramasamy
- Produced by: B. S. Ranga
- Starring: Sivaji Ganesan; Jamuna
- Cinematography: B. S. Ranga
- Edited by: P. G. Mohan; M. Devendranath
- Music by: Viswanathan–Ramamoorthy
- Production company: Vikram Productions
- Release date: 9 February 1962
- Running time: 130 minutes
- Country: India
- Language: Tamil

Nichaya Thamboolam (transl. The Betrothal) is a 1962 Indian Tamil-language romantic drama film, directed and produced by B. S. Ranga. The film stars Sivaji Ganesan and Jamuna. It was released on 9 February 1962. The film was released in Telugu as Pelli Thambulam.

== Plot ==
Raghuraman is the spoiled son of a senior police officer, Ranganathan. Raghuraman's mother, Kamakshi, is a kind-hearted woman. Raghuraman falls in love with Seetha, the daughter of a poor teacher, Ramanna. Ranganathan's family and Ramanna's family are related. When Seetha was born, both parents agreed that she should be married to Raghuraman and exchanged the Nichaya Thamboolam. However, due to their status, the families had been estranged from each other. Raghuraman marries Seetha, who becomes pregnant. Raghuraman suspects Seetha's fidelity and walks out on her. To complicate matters further, Raghuraman is charged with the murder of his friend Pattusamy. Seetha takes the blame for the murder in order to save Raghuraman. After more twists and turns it is revealed that Pattusamy is alive. The families come together and all live happily.

== Cast ==
Male cast

- Sivaji Ganesan as Raghu / Raghuraman
- M. N. Nambiar as Pattusamy
- S. V. Ranga Rao as Ranganathan
- V. Nagayya as Ramanna
- T. S. Durairaj as Pichai Muthu
- S. Rama Rao

Female cast

- Jamuna as Seetha
- P. Kannamba as Kamakshi
- Rajasree as Sarala
- Malathi as Parvathi
- Jothi (special appearance in "Nee Nadanthaal Enna")

== Production ==
For the song "Padaithane Padaithane", Ranga initially built an elaborate set; however he had it torn down and "instead painted the floor wet black and used lamp posts".

== Soundtrack ==
The music composed by Viswanathan–Ramamoorthy and the lyrics were penned by Kannadasan. "Padaithane Padaithane" is set in Bilaskhani Todi, a Hindustani raga. "Paavadai Dhavaniyil" is loosely based on Yamuna Kalyani.

Song	Singers	Length
"Aandavan Padaichan"	T. M. Soundararajan	05:13
"Padaithaane, Padaithaane Manithanai"	T. M. Soundararajan	04:43
"Paavadai Dhavaniyil"	T. M. Soundararajan	04:26
"Alangaram Alangaram"	S. C. Krishnan, L. R. Eswari	02:50
"Ithu Ver Ulagam"	T. M. Soundararajan, L. R. Eswari	04:00
"Maalai Soodum Mana Naal"	P. Susheela	03:07
"Nethiyile Oru Kunguma Pottu"	P. Susheela	03:43
"Nee Nadanthaal Enna"	P. Susheela	02:43

== Reception ==
The film was a box-office success, though it did not hit the 100-day mark.
