= Odahuttidavaru (1969 film) =

- Directed by: B. N. Haridas
- Written by: Vikram Sahithya Shakhe
- Screenplay by: Chi Sadashivaiah
- Produced by: B. S. Ranga
- Starring: Kalyan Kumar; Udaykumar; Balakrishna; Dinesh
- Cinematography: B. N. Haridas
- Edited by: P. G. Mohan; Devendranath; Chakrapani
- Music by: S. Hanumantha Rao
- Production company: Vikram Productions
- Distributed by: Vikram Productions
- Release date: 16 January 1969
- Country: India
- Language: Kannada

Odahuttidavaru is a 1969 Indian Kannada film, directed by B. N. Haridas and produced by B. S. Ranga. The film stars Kalyan Kumar, Udaykumar, Balakrishna and Dinesh in the lead roles. The musical score was composed by S. Hanumantha Rao.

== Cast ==
- Kalyan Kumar
- Udaykumar
- Kalpana
- Pandari Bai
- Balakrishna
- Dinesh
- Rathnakar
- Shyam
- Mahadevaiah
- Baby Shyamsundar
- Jaya
- Baby Maithili
