= Swayamvara (1973 film) =

- Directed by: Y. R. Swamy
- Written by: Ma. Na. Murthy (Based on Novel)
- Produced by: C. R. Basavaraju
- Starring: Rajkumar; Bharathi Vishnuvardhan; T. N. Balakrishna; Dinesh
- Cinematography: V. Manohar
- Edited by: P. Bhakthavathsalam
- Music by: Rajan–Nagendra, Vaidyanathan - Assistant
- Production company: Karnataka Films Ltd.
- Distributed by: Karnataka Films Ltd.
- Release date: 1973
- Country: India
- Language: Kannada

Swayamvara is a 1973 Indian Kannada-language film, directed by Y. R. Swamy and produced by C. R. Basavaraju. The film stars Rajkumar, Bharathi Vishnuvardhan, T. N. Balakrishna and Dinesh. The film has musical score by Rajan–Nagendra. The movie is based on a novel of same name by Ma. Na. Murthy.

== Plot ==
Bharati is a young socialite who does not want to marry. Her father's will explicitly mentions that she would not inherit the family's wealth without marriage. Balakrishna, her lawyer and trusted adviser, sees the news in the paper about Rajkumar, who is a convict about to be hanged. Bharati marries Rajkumar, just to claim her ancestral wealth. The day before the hanging, the real killer reveals on his death-bed that Rajkumar is innocent. Rajkumar is released and thinks it was the marital bliss that changed his fortunes. Anguished that her plans are thwarted, Bharati cries and accuses Rajkumar of plotting. Being the simpleton that he is, Rajkumar mentions he only came to thank her and walks away from her life. Bharati's suitor Dinesh turns up to entice Bharati and enquire on when the estate will be in Bharati's name. The clause inserted in the will shocks them. Bharati must lead a marital life with her husband for at least one month.

Rajkumar is a daily wage labourer, struggling all day in coal-mine for 3 1/4 rupees a day. He has to take care of his sister and now, his supposed-wife. Bharati is introduced to the difficulties of life and learns the value of labour, hard-earned savings, love and life. She is of two minds as to whether to stay as Rajkumar's wife or be part of the plan she hatched to gain riches. On the last day of the agreed stay, Rajkumar's ears are filled with the plot. Rajkumar is dejected, when he learns his wife is in fact is staying with him, only to claim her estate. Bharati saves a kid's life and decides to stay as Rajkumar's wife. Rajkumar, is no mood to listen and asks her to move away from his life. Dejected, Bharati leaves to the city. In the climax, Dinesh and Bharati come to collect Rajkumar's signatures on divorce papers. An accident at the coal mine leads to cave-ins, blocking the way out of coal mines. Rajkumar, Dinesh and Bharati are trapped and to make way, one person has to stay back and fire the dynamite to make way. Rajkumar taunts Dinesh to stay back and prove his love to save Bharati. Dinesh is found out to be self-serving and wouldn't want to risk his life. Rajkumar mentions to Bharati he has signed the divorce papers and says she is free to lead her life. He rushes to make way. Providence saves Rajkumar for the second time, leading Bharati to remark, she has chosen Rajkumar not for the first time in the jail, when he was due to die, but also now, in the face of death. Rajkumar and Bharati happily unite and walk towards their humble home.

== Cast ==
- Rajkumar as Natraj
- Bharathi Vishnuvardhan as Vasanta Devi
- Sampath as Venkappa (Guest appearance)
- Balakrishna as Nanjundaiyya
- Dinesh as Swami
- Raghavendra Rao as Advocate
- Bangalore Nagesh as Chilre
- M. Jayashree as Gauramma
- Kunigal Nagabhushan
- Kunigal Ramanath
- B. Jaya
- Pramila Joshai
- Shani Mahadevappa
- Sampangi
- Bheema Rao
- Srinivas
- Bhushan
- Chikka Veerayya
- Padmanabh
- Nawab
- Siddamallayya
- V. Doreswamy
- Kala
- Nagarathnamma
- Jyothi
- Kamala
- Rajina
- Sushila Naidu
- Ananthamani
- Sathya

== Production ==
Few scenes were shot in Bharat Gold Mines [K.G.F] and Bengaluru Central Jail [its now converted into Freedom Park]

== Soundtrack ==
The music was composed by Rajan–Nagendra.

No.	Song	Singers	Lyrics	Length (m:ss)
1	"Ee Jagavondu"	S. P. Balasubrahmanyam	Ashwath	02:54
2	"Priyasakhi priyamvade"	P. Susheela		
3	"Kotige obba"	S. Janaki		
4	"Ninna kanna kannadiyalli"	P B Srinivas, P Susheela		
