= Bhale Basava =

- Directed by: B. S. Ranga
- Written by: Shyamaladevi
- Screenplay by: G. Balasubramanyam
- Produced by: B. S. Ranga
- Starring: Udaykumar; Rajesh; V. Nagayya; Narasimharaju; Rajasree
- Cinematography: B. N. Haridas
- Edited by: P. G. Mohan; Devendranath; Chakrapani
- Music by: S. Rajeshwara Rao
- Production company: Vikram Productions
- Distributed by: Vikram Productions
- Release date: 24 November 1969
- Country: India
- Language: Kannada

Bhale Basava is a 1969 Indian Kannada-language film, directed and produced by B. S. Ranga. The film stars Udaykumar, Rajesh, V. Nagayya and Narasimharaju. The musical score was composed by S. Rajeshwara Rao.

== Cast ==
- Udaykumar
- Rajesh
- V. Nagayya
- Narasimharaju
- Raghavendra Rao
- Nagappa
- Nagesh
- Maniyam
- Udayashankar
- Jayanthi
- Rajasree
- Premalatha
- Papamma
- Ramadevi
- Sadhana
- Mysore Lakshmi
- Jyothilakshmi
- Shakunthala
