= B. S. Ranga =

Indian photographer, actor, producer and director

- Born: Bindiganavile Srinivas Iyengar Ranga; 11 November 1917; Magadi, Kingdom of Mysore, British India
- Died: 12 December 2010 (aged 93); Chennai, Tamil Nadu, India
- Occupations: Film director, producer, cinematographer, screenwriter

Bindiganavile Srinivas Iyengar Ranga (11 November 1917 – 12 December 2010) was an Indian photographer, actor, producer and director who has made many landmark movies in Kannada, Telugu, and Tamil. He was also the owner of Vikram Studios. He has directed and produced about 87 films in these three languages with a maximum of 18 films in Kannada alone starring matinee idol Dr. Rajkumar.

== Biography ==
He was born to a Hebbar Iyengar family in Magadi Village (near Bare, India) Mysore (now part of Karnataka State). After an art-enriched childhood wherein he interacted with many stage personalities, B.S. Ranga entered the field of photography. At the age of 17, the self-trained Ranga sent some of his work to be exhibited at the Royal Salon in London, and was elected an Honorary Fellow of the Royal Photographic Society.

Subsequently, he moved to Bombay (now Mumbai) and apprenticed himself to the cameraman and laboratory technician, Krishna Gopal. B.S. Ranga then embarked on a film career lasting more than five decades, during which he played the roles of cinematographer, director, producer, laboratory owner, studio owner, exhibitor and script-writer, sometimes all at once for one of his productions. His production company, Vikram Productions, gained prominence in the 1960s and 1970s, and won B.S. Ranga many awards, including two President's Awards. The first was for Tenali Ramakrishna in Telugu (starring N.T. Rama Rao and Akkineni Nageswara Rao), and the second was for Amarshilpi Jakkanachari, the first colour movie produced in Kannada.

== Filmography ==
=== As director ===
Year	Film	Language
1940	Pardesi	Hindi
1940	Pyaas	Hindi
1940	Prakash	Hindi
1941	Bhakta Tulsidas	Hindi
1942	Mehman	Hindi
1942	Fox Movietone News	Hindi
1943	Bakta Naradar	Hindi
1945	Dassi Aparanji	Tamil
1947	Baktha Thulasidas	Tamil
1952	Shanthi	Telugu
1954	Maa Gopi	Telugu
1954	Jaya Gopi	Tamil
1955	Kannavane Kankanda Deivam	Tamil
1955	Baktha Markandeya	Telugu
1956	Tenali Ramakrishna	Telugu
1956	Tenali Raman	Tamil
1957	Kutumba Gauravam	Telugu
1957	Kudumba Gauravam	Tamil
1959	Mahishasura Mardini	Kannada
1959	Raja Malaiya Simman	Tamil
1959	Raja Malaya Simha	Telugu
1960	Mohabbat Ki Jeet	Hindi
1960	Chandrahasa (Gunavathi)	Tamil
1961	Pelli Thambulam	Telugu
1962	Nichaya Thaamboolam	Tamil
1962	Ashajeevulu	Telugu
1962	Thendral Veesum	Tamil
1963	Pyaar Kiya To Darna Kya	Hindi
1964	Amarashilpi Jakanachari	Kannada
1964	Amara Silpi Jakkanna	Telugu
1964	Prathigne	Kannada
1965	Chandrahasa	Kannada
1965	Chandrahasa	Telugu
1965	Mahasathi Anusuya	Kannada
1967	Parvathi Kalyana	Kannada
1967	Vasantha Sena	Telugu
1969	Shiva Bhakta	Kannada
1969	Bhale Basava	Kannada
1970	Mr. Rajkumar	Kannada
1971	Sidila Mari	Kannada
1972	Bhai Behen	Hindi
1973	Mannina Magalu	Kannada
1973	Pattikaattu Ponnaiya	Tamil
1975	Ganga Ki Kasam	Hindi
1978	Suli	Kannada
1981	Bhagyavantha	Kannada
1982	Hasyaratna Ramakrishna	Kannada
1984	Huliyada Kala	Kannada

=== As Cinematographer ===
Year	Film	Language
1944	Bala Nagamma	Telugu
1951	Stree Sahasam	Telugu
1951	Sthree Sahasam	Tamil
1953	Devadasu	Telugu
1956	Tenali Ramakrishna	Telugu
1959	Mahishasura Mardini	Kannada
1962	Nichaya Thaamboolam	Tamil
1964	Prathigne	Kannada

=== As producer ===
Year	Film	Language
1955	Baktha Markandeya	Telugu
1956	Tenali Ramakrishna	Telugu
1959	Mahishasura Mardini	Kannada
1960	Dashavathara	Kannada
1962	Nichaya Thaamboolam	Tamil
1964	Amara Silpi Jakkanna	Telugu
1964	Prathigne	Kannada
1965	Chandrahasa	Kannada
1965	Mahasathi Anusuya	Kannada
1966	Kiladi Ranga	Kannada
1967	Parvathi Kalyana	Kannada
1967	Rajashekara	Kannada
1969	Odahuttidavaru	Kannada
1969	Bhale Basava	Kannada
1970	Mr. Rajkumar	Kannada
1971	Sidila Mari	Kannada
1973	Mannina Magalu	Kannada
1973	Pattikaattu Ponnaiya	Tamil
1978	Suli	Kannada

=== As Screenwriter ===
Year	Film	Language
1959	Mahishasura Mardini	Kannada
1967	Rajashekara	Kannada
1981	Bhagyavantha	Kannada

== Awards ==
National Film Awards:

- All India Certificate of Merit for Best Feature Film in 1957.
- 1956 – President's silver medal for Best Feature Film in Telugu – Tenali Ramakrishna

== External ==
- B. S. Ranga at IMDb
