= Makkale Manege Manikya =

- Directed by: A. V. Sheshagiri Rao
- Written by: Sriramachand
- Produced by: N. B. Vathsalan
- Starring: Udaykumar; R. Nagendra Rao; Dinesh; Ranga
- Cinematography: Sanjeevi
- Edited by: Bal G. Yadav
- Music by: Vijaya Bhaskar
- Production company: Rupashree
- Distributed by: Rupashree
- Release date: 30 April 1969
- Country: India
- Language: Kannada

Makkale Manege Manikya is a 1969 Indian Kannada-language film, directed by A. V. Sheshagiri Rao and produced by N. B. Vathsalan. The film stars Udaykumar, R. Nagendra Rao, Dinesh and Ranga in the lead roles. The musical score was composed by Vijaya Bhaskar.

== Cast ==
- Udaykumar
- R. Nagendra Rao
- Dinesh
- Ranga
- Sathya
- Adavani Lakshmi
- B. V. Radha
- Shailashree
- B. Jaya
- M. Shivaji Rao
- Narayana Rao
- Venkata Raman
- Govinda Rajan
- Kumar
- Shivanna
- Prakash
- Srinivas
- Y. R. Ashwath Narayan
- Master Krishnakumar
- Baby Prashanth
