= Udaykumar =

Indian actor and producer (1933–1985)

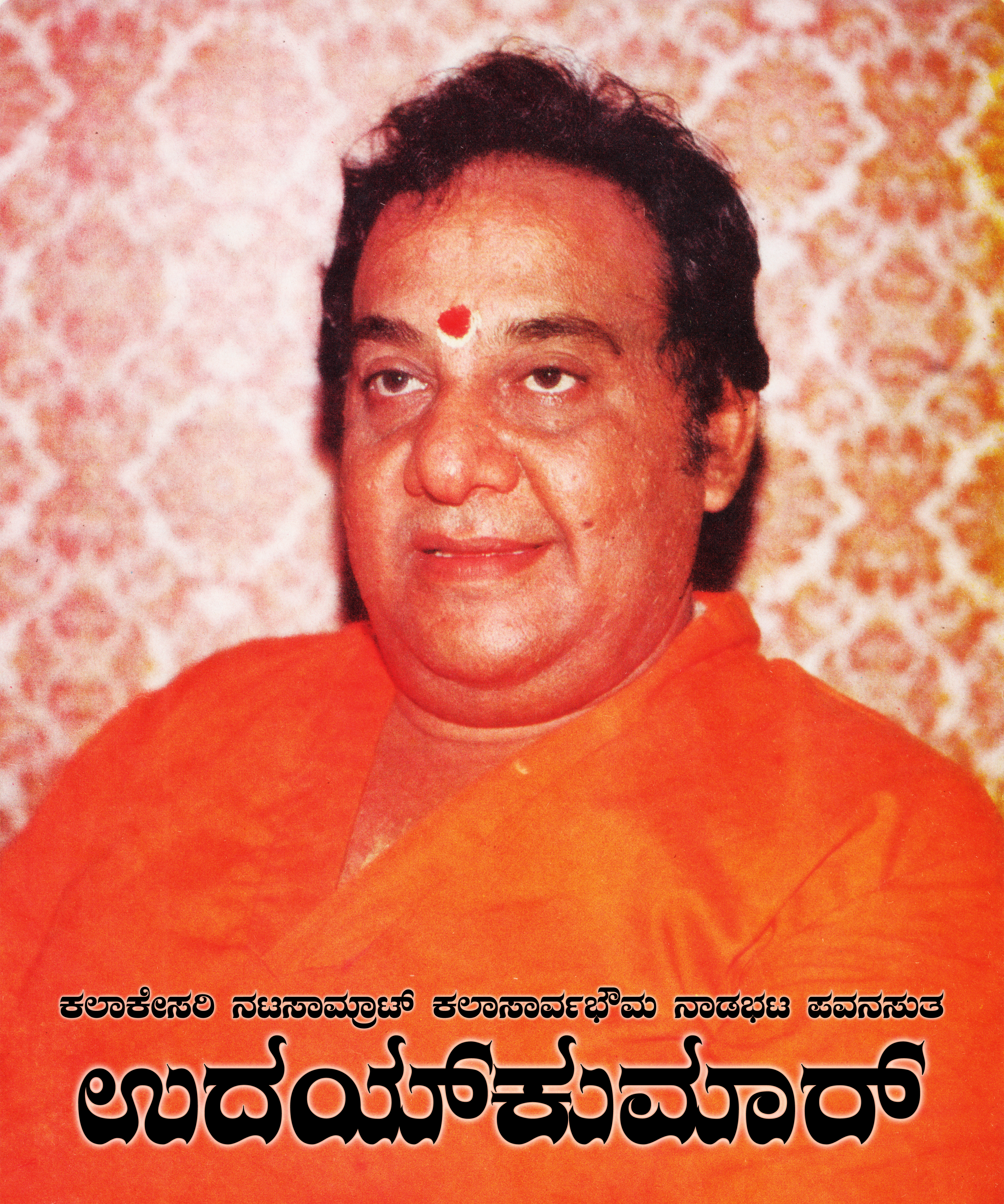
- Born: Bommasandra Srinivasaiah Suryanarayana Murthy; 16 March 1933; Palacode, Dharmapuri, Madras Presidency, British India
- Died: 26 December 1985 (aged 52); Bangalore, India
- Occupations: Actor, film producer, director, writer, novelist, lyricist
- Years active: 1954–1985
- Spouse: Kamalamma (m. 1953)
- Children: 5

Bommasandra Srinivasaiah Suryanarayana Murthy (16 March 1933 – 26 December 1985), known professionally as Udaykumar, was an Indian actor, writer, and film producer who worked primarily in Kannada cinema. Along with Rajkumar and Kalyan Kumar, he was part of the trio known as the Kumarathrayaru ("the three Kumars") of Kannada cinema. In addition to acting, he wrote several stage dramas and books.

Uday Kumar appeared in a wide variety of roles and collaborated with many notable actors of his era. In the early part of his career, he was cast in heroic roles, but he later became known for portraying complex antagonists, particularly in historical and mythological films, where he was frequently cast opposite Rajkumar’s protagonist roles.

== Early life ==
Uday Kumar was born into a Brahmin family, with sources differing on his birth date—some citing 5 March 1933 and others 16 March 1933. He was the second of four children and the only son of B. S. Srinivasaiah and Sharadamma. The family's ancestral roots trace back to Andhra Pradesh but they had settled in ⁣⁣Karnataka approximately two centuries prior to his birth.

He received his primary education in the villages of Helaine and Muthanallur near Sarjapura in Bangalore district and later completed his secondary education in Anekal. During his school years, he actively participated in cultural events and competitions.

After an unsuccessful attempt at the matriculation examination, Uday Kumar married Kamalamma at the age of 20. He subsequently worked as a physical education teacher at a school in Anekal. On the advice of a friend, he relocated to Bangalore, where he joined the theatre troupe of Gubbi Veeranna, marking the beginning of his acting career.

== Film career ==
In 1954, while working on the script for Bhagyodaya (1956), screenwriter Kanagal Prabhakar Shastry was seeking a lead actor for the film. At the time, Uday Kumar was performing as Buddha in a stage production in Mandya with Gubbi Veeranna’s theater troupe. S. K. Bhagavan, Shastry’s assistant, observed the performance and offered Uday Kumar a screen test. Following the test, he was cast in the lead role. Shastry also gave him the screen name "Uday Kumar," inspired by the film's title and the production company, Udaya Productions.

Known by the nickname "Gandugali," Uday Kumar acted in 193 films, including 171 in Kannada, 15 in Telugu, six in Tamil, and one in Hindi. He received several regional awards, particularly for his contributions to Kannada cinema.

Beyond his work in film, Uday Kumar was involved in Kannada cultural and linguistic movements. He supported the unification of Kannadigas and collaborated with individuals such as Ma Ramamurthy, A. N. Krishna Rao (Aa. Na. Kru), Thirumale Shriranga Tatacharya, Ta. Su. Shama Rao, Ha. Ma. Nayak, and Ta. Ra. Su. to promote the Kannada language and culture through speeches, writings, and public events.

He founded Udaya Kalanikethana, a training institute for theater and film acting, with the aim of promoting performing arts. He also supported professional theater groups across Karnataka, and beginning in 1960, regularly dedicated one week each month to stage performances.

In 2005, on the occasion of what would have been his 73rd birthday, a charitable trust named Pavanasutha Kesari Kalaa Shalaa was established during a commemorative cultural event titled Udaya-73 Ondu Savinenapu in Anekal, his birthplace. The trust, founded by Vikram Udaykumar, runs social and cultural initiatives, including P. S. M. School and Kalaashaala—a cultural school offering training in classical music and performing arts such as Bharatanatyam. Its activities also include rural arts education and organizing state-level theater competitions.

== Filmography ==
=== Kannada films ===
Year	Film	Role(s)	Notes
1956	Bhagyodaya		
1956	Daiva Sankalpa		
1956	Panchratna	Ishwara	
1957	Varadakshine	Raghu	
1957	Bettada Kalla	Bhairava	
1957	Rathnagiri Rahasya	Rajkumar Chakravarthy	
1957	Premada Putri		
1958	Bhakta Prahlada		
1958	Mane Thumbida Hennu		
1958	School Master	Ravikumar	
1959	Mahishasura Mardini	Rambhesha	
1960	Dashavathara	Kamsa	
1960	Ranadheera Kanteerava	Vishwanatha Shastry	
1960	Bhakta Kanakadasa		
1960	Shivalinga Sakshi		
1961	Mahavat		
1961	Vijayanagarada Veeraputhra		
1961	Raja Satya Vrata		
1962	Rathna Manjari		
1962	Gaali Gopura		Cameo
1962	Vidhivilasa		
1962	Thayi Karulu		
1962	Bhoodana	Rama	
1962	Nanda Deepa	Ravi	
1962	Karuneye Kutumbada Kannu	Ranganna	
1963	Santha Thukaram		
1963	Jenu Goodu	Rajanna	
1963	Chandra Kumara		
1963	Veera Kesari		
1963	Sri Ramanjaneya Yuddha		
1963	Bevu Bella		
1963	Mana Mecchida Madadi	Devarajayya	
1963	Malli Maduve		
1964	Amarashilpi Jakanachari		
1964	Chandavalliya Thota	Sivananjaya Gowda	
1964	Kalaavati	Suresh	
1964	Naandi		Cameo
1965	Miss Leelavathi	Kapanipathi Rao	Cameo
1965	Veera Vikrama		
1965	Chandrahasa	Shekhara	
1965	Kavaleradu Kulavondu		
1965	Ide Mahasudina	Raja	
1965	Maduve Madi Nodu	Bheemanna	
1965	Bettada Huli	Bhairava	
1965	Sathi Savithri		
1965	Satya Harishchandra	Vishvamitra	
1965	Pathivratha		
1965	Vathsalya	Anand	
1966	Deva Maanava		
1966	Madhu Malathi		
1966	Sandhya Raga	Rama	
1966	Katari Veera		
1966	Mohini Bhasmasura	Shiva	
1966	Badukuva Daari		
1966	Mane Katti Nodu		
1966	Mantralaya Mahatme	Thimmanna Bhat	
1967	Rajadurgada Rahasya		
1967	Padavidhara		
1967	Immadi Pulakeshi	Kubja Vishnuvardhana	
1967	Parvathi Kalyana	Narada	
1967	Bangarada Hoovu	Ravi	
1967	Sathi Sukanya		
1967	Rajashekara	Jagamalla	
1967	Chakra Theertha	Kashipathaiah	
1967	Sri Purandara Dasaru	Vyasatirtha	
1968	Hoovu Mullu	Bhima	
1968	Arunodaya		
1968	Simha Swapna		
1968	Anna Thamma		
1968	Dhoomakethu		
1968	Mysore Tanga		
1968	Maneye Maha Mandira		
1968	Namma Ooru		
1968	Jedara Bale	Gopinath Kumar	
1968	Mahasathi Arundathi		
1968	Naane Bhagyavati		
1969	Chaduranga		
1969	Bhale Basava	Basava	
1969	Maduve Maduve Maduve		
1969	Ade Hridaya Ade Mamathe		
1969	Mathrubhoomi		
1969	Madhura Milana	Ramesh	
1969	Kalpa Vruksha		
1969	Mukunda Chandra		
1969	Odahuttidavaru	Sundar	
1969	Shiva Bhakta		
1969	Makkale Manege Manikya		
1969	Bhagirathi		
1970	Takka Bitre Sikka		
1970	Kallara Kalla	Shankar	
1970	Hasiru Thorana	Suri	
1970	Aaru Mooru Ombhatthu		
1970	Mrityu Panjaradalli Goodarachari 555	Bhaskar	
1970	Sedige Sedu	Ranga	
1970	Mukti		
1970	Rangamahal Rahasya	Kumar	
1970	Prateekaara		
1970	Modala Rathri	C.B.I. Head	
1971	Sidila Mari		
1971	Bhale Rani		
1971	Jatakarathna Gunda Joisa		
1971	Bhale Bhaskar		
1971	Samshaya Phala		
1971	Kasidre Kailasa	Ramu	
1971	Purnima		
1971	Signalman Siddappa		
1971	Mahadimane		
1972	Kulla Agent 000		
1972	Kaanch Aur Heera		
1972	Nari Munidare Mari		
1973	Bettada Bhairava		
1973	Mannina Magalu		
1973	Cowboy Kulla		
1973	Bharathada Rathna		
1973	Triveni		
1973	Prema Paasha		
1974	Chamundeshwari Mahime		
1974	Nanu Baalabeku	Ramanath	
1975	Sarpa Kavalu		
1975	Ashirwada		
1975	Bili Hendthi		
1975	Jagruthi		
1975	Mantra Shakti		
1976	Sutrada Bombe		
1976	Rajanarthakiya Rahasya		
1977	Banashankari		
1977	Shani Prabhava		
1977	Hemavathi		
1977	Shri Renukadavi Mahatme		
1977	Srimanthana Magalu		
1978	Maathu Tappada Maga	Diamonds smuggler	
1978	Madhura Sangama	Stage actor in play as Kampili Raya	Cameo
1978	Parashuraman		
1978	Bhale Huduga		
1978	Devadasi		
1979	Putani Agent 123		
1979	Seetharamu		
1980	Vajrada Jalapatha	Parangi	
1980	Maria My Darling	Mahadeva / "Ramdas"	
1980	Moogana Sedu	Papanna	
1980	Chitrakoota		
1980	Kaalinga	Vinayak Patil	
1981	Kula Puthra		
1981	Garjane		
1981	Thayiya Madilalli		
1982	Sahasa Simha	Chaudhary	Cameo
1982	Mava Sose Saval		
1982	Kempu Hori		
1983	Nodi Swamy Navirodu Hige	Aparna's father	
1983	Bhayankara Bhasmasura		
1983	Devara Theerpu		
1983	Kalluveene Nudiyithu		
1984	Gandu Bherunda		
1984	Agni Gundam		
1984	Kanoonige Saval	Public Prosecutor	
1984	Maryade Mahalu		
1984	Police Papanna		
1985	Vishakanya	Kapala Bhairava	
1985	Pithamaha		
1985	Havu Eni Aata		
1985	Lakshmi Kataksha	Narayanadasa	
1988	Varna Chakra		

=== Telugu films ===
Year	Film	Role(s)	Notes
1959	Veer Bhaskaradu		
1961	Sita Rama Kalyanam	Kumbhakarna	
1966	Sri Krishna Pandaveeyam	Bhima	
1983	Maga Maharaju	Raghavaiah	
1984	Bharyamani		
1984	Mahanagaramlo Mayagadu		
1984	Ee Charitra Inkennallu		

=== Tamil films ===
Year	Film	Role(s)	Notes
1958	Sengottai Singam	Singam	
1960	Yanai Paagan	Shankar	
1960	Ivan Avanethan		
1980	Maria My Darling		

== Awards ==
- Karnataka State Film Awards:
  - 1967-68 – Won – Best Supporting Actor – Chakra Theertha
  - 1977-78 – Won – Best Supporting Actor – Hemavathi
