= Dinesh (Kannada actor) =

Indian actor

- Born: Balasubramanium; 1937; Mysore, Kingdom of Mysore
- Died: 28 April 1990 (aged 52–53); Bangalore, Karnataka, India
- Occupation: Actor
- Spouse: Vimala
- Children: 5

Balasubramaniam (1937–1990), known by his screen name Dinesh, was an Indian actor known for his work in Kannada cinema. Notably, he acted in Bhootayyana Maga Ayyu (1974), Golmaal Radhakrishna (1990), S. P. Sangliyana Part 2 (1990) and Seetharamu (1979).

== Biography ==
Balasubramaniam was born and brought up in Mysore, where he completed his matriculation. He was one of seven children of Singaravelu, a ticket collector with the Indian Railways, and Dhanalakshmi. Balasubramaniam was married to Vimala, a singer. His wife was called to perform at Gubbi Veeranna's theatre company, when Dinesh followed her. Once there, he was given opportunities to act in plays, thanks to his booming voice. However, eager to act in films, Balasubramaniam travelled to Madras (now Chennai) for an audition for a Kannada-language film. He was rejected owing to his lack of fluency in the language. Balasubramaniam subsequently returned to Karnataka where he continued performing on stage.

Balasubramaniam's first film appearance came in Naandi (1964), during the making of which he was given the screen name, Dinesh, by producer Vadiraj. The 1960s saw Dinesh appearing in negative-shaded roles such as in Choori Chikkanna (1969). In Seetharamu (1979), he appeared in a comedic character, a role he would continue to portray majorly for the rest of his career. In Ruthugaana (1977), his 100th film as an actor, Dinesh played the lead role. Dinesh appeared in a total of 360 films. His final screen appearance came in Udbhava (1990). Dinesh was also an active stage actor during this time; he was touring with a troupe performing Lakshadheeshwara, a play written by him. Dinesh died from cardiac arrest on 28 April 1990, aged 53.

== Selected filmography ==
Year	Title	Role	Notes
1964	Naandi	Gopal Rao	
1965	Ide Mahasudina	Ranga	
1965	Bettada Huli		
1966	Kiladi Ranga		
1966	Sri Kanyaka Parameshwari Kathe	Agni Deva	
1967	Beedi Basavanna		
1967	Gange Gowri		
1967	Manassiddare Marga	Johnny	
1967	Premakkoo Permitte		
1967	Rajashekara		
1967	Rajadurgada Rahasya		
1968	Amma	Lingaraju	
1968	Chinnari Puttanna		
1968	Gandhinagara		
1968	Hannele Chiguridaga	Keshava	
1968	Jedara Bale		
1968	Manku Dinne		
1968	Mysore Tanga		
1968	Rowdy Ranganna	Chikka	
1968	Simha Swapna	Yugandhara	
1968	Lakshadheeshwara	Raje Gowda	
1969	Choori Chikkanna	Rajashekhar	
1969	Gandondu Hennaru		
1969	Makkale Manege Manikya		
1969	Odahuttidavaru		
1969	Suvarna Bhoomi		
1970	Bhoopathi Ranga	Dharmashekhara Sathyamurthy	
1970	C.I.D. Rajanna		
1970	Karulina Kare	Raja / Soorappa	
1970	Namma Mane	Giri	
1970	Sri Krishnadevaraya	Achyuta Deva Raya	
1970	Modala Rathri	Nanjundappa	
1970	Nyayave Devaru	Narasimha	
1971	Pratidwani	Bhushan	
1971	Sri Krishna Rukmini Satyabhama	Shishupala	
1973	Swayamvara	Swami	
1973	Triveni	Parameshwaraiah	
1973	Bidugade	Devappa	
1978	Kiladi Jodi	Somaiah	
1978	Madhura Sangama	Vasu's friend	
1979	Seetharamu		
1979	Naniruvude Ninagagi	Columbus	
1980	Point Parimala		
1981	Ranganayaki	Venkataramana Shetty	
1981	Simhada Mari Sainya		
1981	Bhaari Bharjari Bete	Chamkanna	
1982	Jimmy Gallu	Chowdappa	
1982	Mullina Gulabi	Sarvesha	
1982	Tony	Damodara	
1984	Gandu Bherunda	Taggappa Sharanappa Menshinkayi	
1984	Indina Bharatha	Constable Hanumayya	
1984	Shapatha	Swaminatha	
1984	Makkaliralavva Mane Thumba	Maruthi Rao	
1986	Malaya Marutha		
1987	Anthima Ghatta		
1987	Poornachandra	Kuppaswamy Naidu	
1987	Prema Kadambari		
1987	Ee Bandha Anubandha		
1987	Lorry Driver	Appanna Pandita	
1988	Shanthi Nivasa		
1988	Krishna Rukmini		
1989	Anantana Avantara		
1989	Hrudaya Geethe		
1989	Kindari Jogi		
1989	C.B.I. Shankar	Subramanya	
1990	Golmaal Radhakrishna	Inspector	
1990	S. P. Sangliyana Part 2		
1990	Udbhava	Rangayya	
1991	Avatara Purusha		
1993	Prana Snehitha		

== See also ==
- List of people from Karnataka
