= M. S. Parthasarathy =

M.S. Parthasarathy
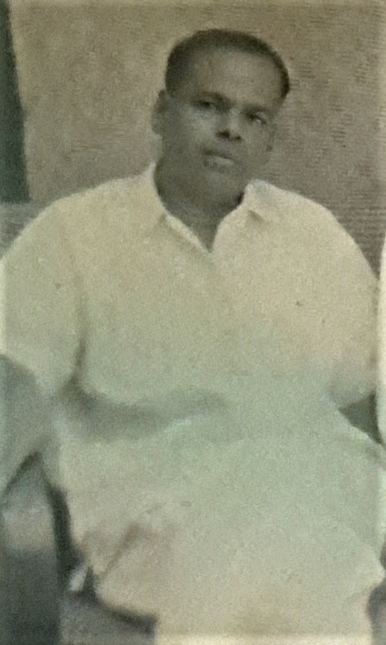
- Born: 28 August 1924; Madras, British India
- Died: 29 April 1981 (aged 56)
- Occupations: Film editor, director and producer
- Years active: 1941–1975
- Notable work: Errakota Veerudu, Bhakta Kanakadasa, Ondre Kulam, Sumangali
- Spouse: P. Andal (m. 9-Sep-1948)
- Children: 5

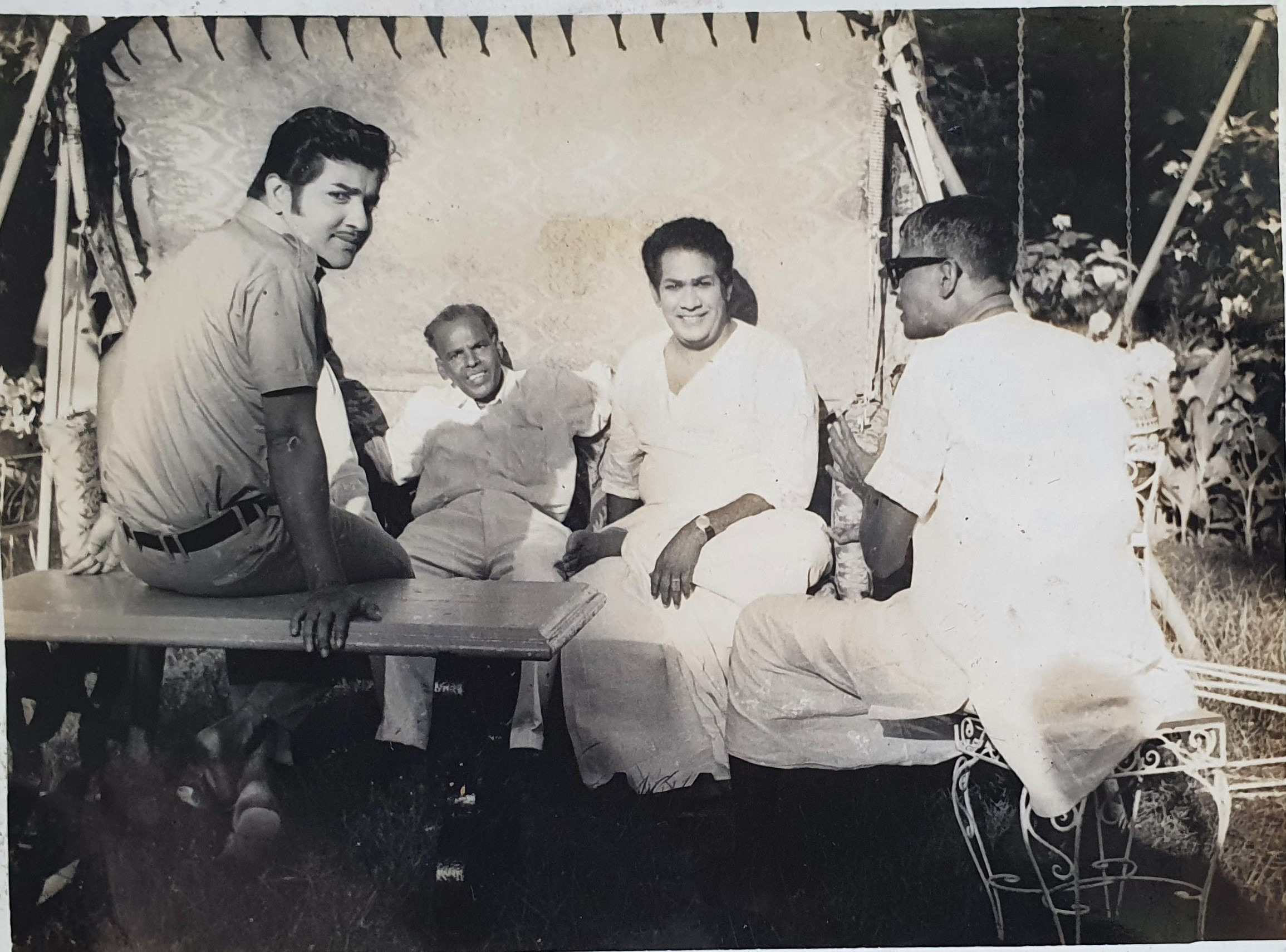
Photo take during Kataya Kalyanam movie discussion. Left to Right, Sivakumar, M. S. Parthasarathy, O. A. K. Thevar

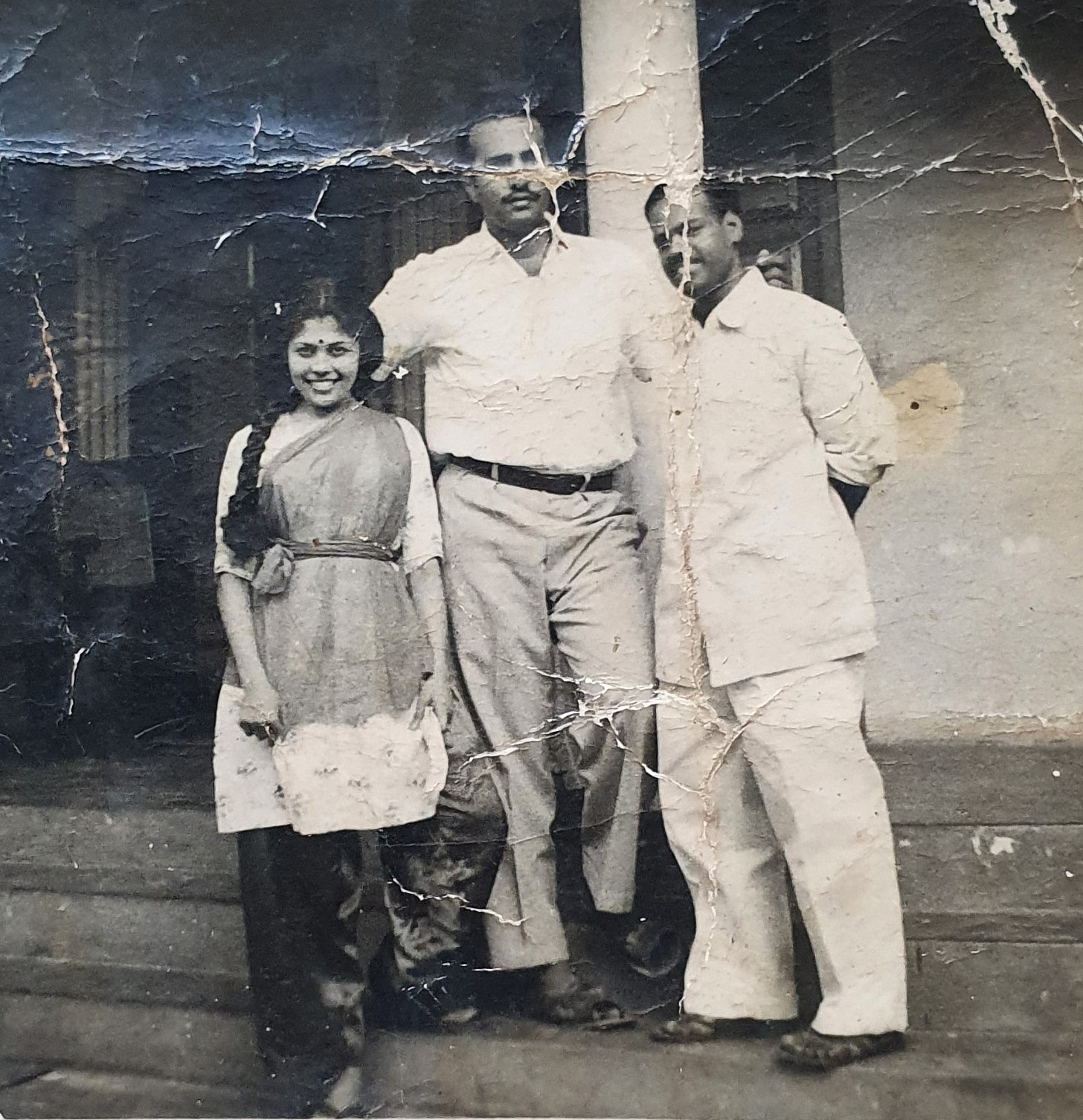
M. S. Parthasarathy with Robin Tampoe and his wife Rita Carmelyn Fernando

M.S. Parthasarathy or M.S.P. Sarathi (28 August 1924 – 29 April 1981) was an Indian film editor, director, and producer. He is nicknamed as "Japan" due to his hard working nature. He was closely associated with H.M. Reddy and worked numerous movies with him as an editor. He directed Telugu movie Errakota Veerudu (1973) with NT Rama Rao in the lead role. He edited Bhakta Kanakadasa (1960), with Dr. Rajkumar in the lead role which marked the official 100th film in Sandalwood (Kannada) film industry. He also edited Vaddante Dabbu with NT Rama Rao in the lead role.

Parthasarathy also contributed to cross-cultural movies. He had collaborated with director and producer Robin Tampoe with whom he edited numerous films between 1958 and 1960 in Sri Lanka in Sinhala language.

== Early years ==
Parthasarathy was born in Mylapore, Chennai, India, the eldest son of Annapurani Ammal and M.C. Sada Gopal, Mylapore high school headmaster. He did his schooling at Mylapore Government High School. Due to the family's financial situation during World War II, Parthasarathy began a lifelong career in the film industry, adoring various hats. He started his career as editor when he was 16 yrs old. He was trained on the job. In collaboration with Rohini Pictures he worked in both Tamil and Telugu film industry.

Parthasarathy was well versed in five Indian languages (Tamil, Telugu, Kannada, Malayalam and Hindi) and two international languages (English and Sinhala). He has worked as associate editor and as editor in Tamil, Telugu, Kannada and Sinhala movies. Parthasarathy was the editor of movie Chandralekha (1948). The movie then underwent scripting and filming crew changes, and when the first director TG Raghavachari alias Acharya walked out on the film, Parthasarathy followed him.

== Career history ==
Parthasarathy was the editor for Niraparadhi is a 1951 Telugu/Tamil film produced and directed by H. M. Reddy. Mukkamala Krishna Murthy played lead role whereas Anjali Devi played a dual role and Sivaji Ganesan's debut movie as dubbing artist and given his voice to Mukkamala Krishna Murthy for the Tamil version. In collaboration with Rohini Pictures he worked in both Tamil and Telugu film industry, editing note-worthy movies like Gruhalakshmi (1955) and Vaddante Dabbu (1954) He worked as associate editor in the Vanjam (1953) movie, Tamil-language film directed by Y. R. Swamy and produced by M.M Reddy and in movie Panam Paduthum Paadu (1953), produced by H.M Reddy and directed by Y.R Swamy.

Parthasarathy edited the famous, Ondre Kulam (1956) Tamil-language film produced and directed by N. Krishnaswamy. The film stars R. S. Manohar and Madhuri Devi. This film title was named by former Tamil Nadu Chief Minister K.Kamaraj and it a 1956 award-winning Tamil film. He moved to Sri Lanka to work in cross-cultural movies. He was a pioneer editor in Sri Lankan films. In collaboration with Robin Tampoe he edited a Sinhala-language film, Sepali (1958), Srimali (1959). He worked in the Sri Lankan Sinhala-language film, produced by P.L Buddhadasa and Mina Tampoe.

== Director and producer ==
Parthasarathy directed the Telugu blockbuster movie, Errakota veeradu (1973). with Actor NT Rama Rao and Actress Savithri in the lead role. The movie, 'Kataya Kalyanam' in Tamil, with Actor Sivakumar in lead role along with Kumari Padmini and Srividya was directed and produced by Parthasarathy. Unfortunately, the movie didn't make it to the silver screen due to health and financial constraints.

== Partial filmography ==
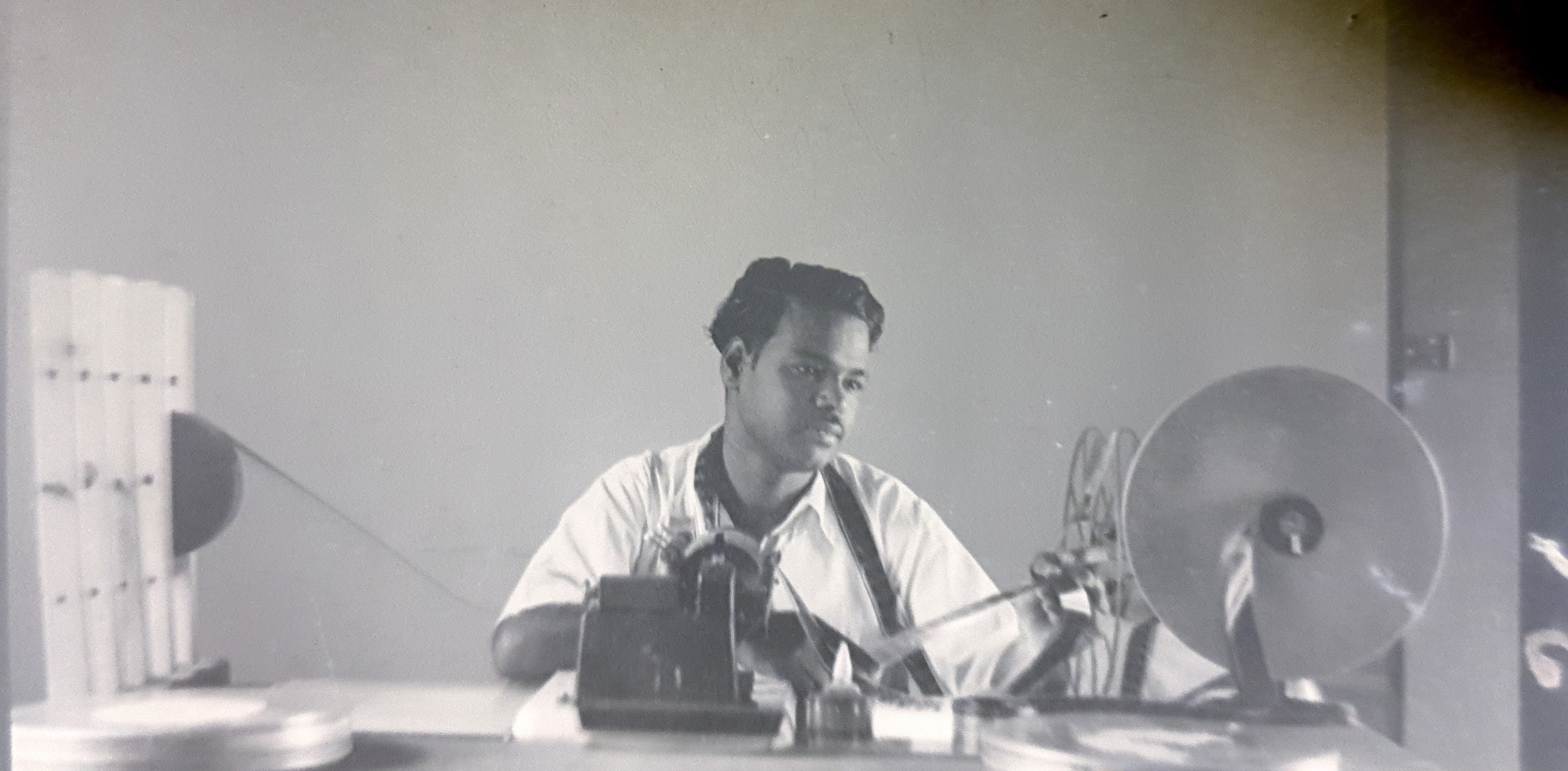
M. S. Parthasarathy editing in action

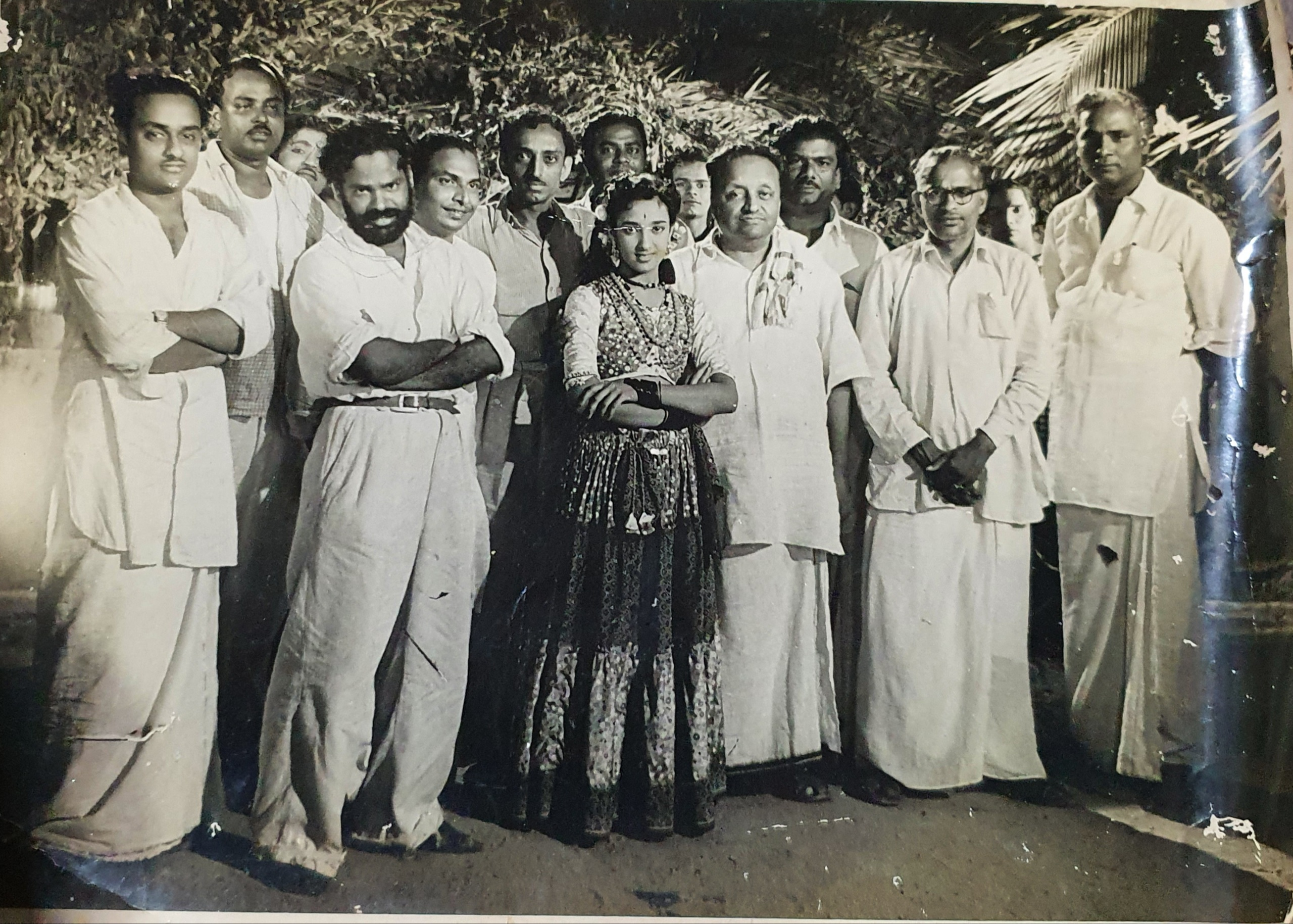
M. S. Parthasarathy (2nd front left), Padma Subrahmanyam (3rd front left), K. Subramanyam (3rd front right)

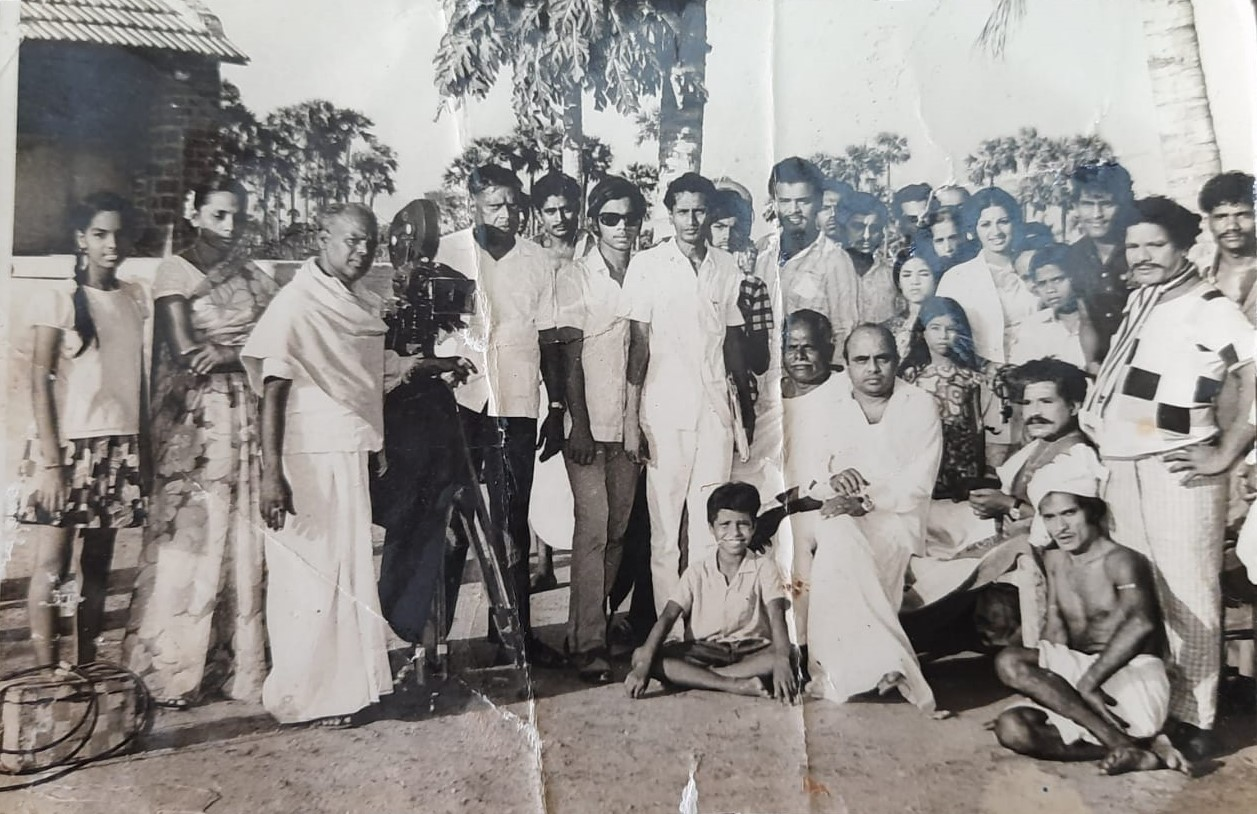
Photo take at Kataya Kalyanam shooting. M. S. Parthasarathy (3rd from left), Srividya (5th from right standing)

Year	Movies	Language	Notes
1950	Sri Sai Baba	Telugu	
1951	Niraparadhi	Tamil/Telugu	
1954	Vaddante Dabbu	Telugu	
1955	Gruhalakshmi	Tamil	
1956	Ondre Kulam	Tamil	
1958	Sepali	Sinhala	
1959	Srimali	Sinhala	
1959	Sumangali	Tamil	
1960	Bhakta Kanakadasa	Kannada	
1967	Chand Par Chadayee	Hindi	This is first science fiction movie in Hindi released in the year 1967 with the story line of traveling to Moon, in fact this movie was released two years before Neil Armstrong landed in Moon in 1969.
1973	Errakota Veerudu	Telugu	
