= Gruhalakshmi (1955 film) =

- Directed by: H. V. Babu
- Screenplay by: Udhayakumar (dialogues)
- Story by: H. M. Reddy
- Produced by: H. M. Reddy
- Starring: M. K. Radha; Anjali Devi; V. Nagayya; T. V. Kumudhini
- Cinematography: D. L. Narayana
- Edited by: M. S. Parthasarathy
- Music by: B. S. Kala/Sarala; T. A. Kalyanam; G. Natarajan
- Production company: Rohini Pictures
- Distributed by: Rohini Pictures
- Release date: 14 April 1955
- Running time: 181 minutes
- Country: India
- Language: Tamil

Gruhalakshmi (transl. Prosperous House-wife) is a 1955 Indian Tamil-language drama film directed by H. V. Babu. The film stars M. K. Radha and Anjali Devi. It is a remake of the 1938 Telugu film of the same name. The film was released on 14 April 1955.

== Cast ==
List adapted from the database of Film News Anandan

Male cast

- M. K. Radha
- V. Nagayya
- Raghuveer
- Peer Mohamed
- T. E. Krishnamachari

Female cast

- Anjali Devi
- T. V. Kumudhini
- Bombay Meenakshi
- Padma

== Production ==
The film was produced by H. M. Reddy who earlier produced and directed the Telugu version in 1938. This Tamil version was directed by H. V. Babu (Hanumappa Viswanath Babu). H. M. Reddy wrote the story and the dialogues were written by Udayakumar. D. L. Narayana handled the cinematography while the editing was done by M. S. Parthasarathy. Art direction was by A. K. Sekar and the choreography was done by Natraj. Still photography was done by Eswar Babu. The film was made at Film Centre, Madras.

== Soundtrack ==
Music was composed by B. S. Kala, Sarala, T. A. Kalyanam and G. Nataraj. A song "Kaalai Thookki Nindru Aadum", penned by Carnatic music composer Marimutha Pillai was included in the film.

Song	Singer/s	Lyricist	Duration (m:ss)
"Jaya Jaya Savithri Devi"	P. Leela	Papanasam Sivan	
"Kanne Maniye Kannoli Poove"	Ghantasala	Guhan	
"Vaaraayi Sukumaaraa Yen Manadhil"	Jikki	Guhan	3:19
"O Settaiyyaa Sottaiyyaa"	P. Leela	Guhan	
"Paapam Seydheno"	P. Leela & K. Jamuna Rani	Guhan	
"Kaalai Thookki Ninru Aadum"	Natarajan & Padma	Marimutha Pillai	
