= Aada Paduchu =

- Theatrical release poster
- Directed by: K. Hemambharadhara Rao
- Written by: K. Pratyagatma (dialogues)
- Screenplay by: L. V. Prasad
- Story by: T. S. Natarajan
- Based on: En Thangai (Tamil)
- Produced by: K. Hemambharadhara Rao
- Starring: N. T. Rama Rao; Krishna Kumari; Sobhan Babu; Vanisree; Chandrakala
- Cinematography: M. G. Singh; M. C. Shekar
- Edited by: B. Gopala Rao
- Music by: T. Chalapathi Rao
- Production company: Subhashini Art Pictures
- Release date: 30 November 1967
- Running time: 162 minutes
- Country: India
- Language: Telugu

Aada Paduchu (transl. Sister) is a 1967 Indian Telugu-language drama film, produced and directed by K. Hemambaradhara Rao under the Subhashini Art Pictures banner. It stars N. T. Rama Rao, Krishna Kumari, Sobhan Babu, Vanisri and Chandrakala, with music composed by T. Chalapathi Rao. The film is a remake of the 1952 Tamil movie En Thangai (1952) which was earlier remade in Hindi in 1959 as Chhoti Bahen and in Kannada in 1967 as Onde Balliya Hoogalu. The film received critical acclaim and was recorded as a Super Hit at the box office.

== Cast ==
- N. T. Rama Rao as Satyam
- Chandrakala as Sharada
- Shobhan Babu as Sekhar
- Relangi as Dharmaiah
- Padmanabham as Sadanandam
- Nagabhushanam as Rao Bahadoor Ranga Rao
- Haranath as Dr. Ramesh
- Chadalavada as Sukhalu
- Vanisree as Lalitha
- Krishna Kumari as Susheela
- Geetanjali as Hema
- Radha Kumari as Manga

== Soundtrack ==
Aada Paduchu

Film score by T. Chalapathi Rao
- Released: 1967
- Genre: Soundtrack
- Length: 22:54
- Label: His Master's Voice
- Producer: T. Chalapathi Rao

Music composed by T. Chalapathi Rao. Music released by His Master's Voice.

S. No.	Song title	Lyrics	Singers	length
1	"Anna Nee Anuragam"	Dasaradhi	P. Susheela	4:10
2	"Garadi Chese Kannulatho"	Dasaradhi	T. R. Jayadev, P. Susheela	4:34
3	"Madhi Thulli Thulli Yegirindi"	Aarudhra	P. Susheela	4:01
4	"Prema Pakshulam"	C. Narayana Reddy	Madhavapeddi Satyam, Vasantha	3:43
5	"Idhena Dayaleni"	Sri Sri	P. Susheela	3:31
6	"Rikshavalanu"	Kosaraju	Ghantasala	3:05

== Box office ==
The film ran for more than 100 days in five centers in Guntur, Vijayawada, Kakinada, Rajahmundry and Visakhapatnam.

== Reception ==
Sikaraju of Andhra Sachitra Vara Patrika praised the risk taken by the producers in making the movie. He wrote positively about the performance of the cast and the music composition. He critically praised N. T. Rama Rao for taking up a new role against the popular culture.
