= Onde Balliya Hoogalu =

- Directed by: M.Nageshwara Rao
- Based on: En Thangai (Tamil)
- Produced by: Vanamala S. Nayak
- Starring: K. S. Ashwath; Rajashankar; Balakrishna; Dikki Madhavarao
- Cinematography: S. J. Thomas
- Edited by: Bal G. Yadav; Thathayya
- Music by: Satyam
- Production company: Amrithakala Productions
- Distributed by: Amrithakala Productions
- Release date: 20 January 1967
- Running time: 138 min
- Country: India
- Language: Kannada

Onde Balliya Hoogalu ( transl. Flowers from the same creeper) is a 1967 Indian Kannada film, directed by M.Nageshwara Rao and M. S. Nayak and produced by Vanamala S. Nayak. The film stars K. S. Ashwath, Rajashankar, Balakrishna and Dikki Madhavarao in the lead roles. The film has musical score by Satyam. The film was a remake of the 1952 Tamil film En Thangai which was earlier remade in Hindi in 1959 as Chhoti Bahen and later in Telugu in 1967 as Aada Paduchu.

The film has many firsts. The first Kannada song by Mohammed Rafi who sang the ever popular "Neenelli nadeve Doora" and first Kannada song by K. J. Yesudas who sang another popular song "Daari Kaanade Bandavale". The film saw a resounding success commercially and also acclaimed for its simplistic portrayal of Brother Sister bonding.

In an interview to Telugu and Kannada Film Director M.Nageshwara Rao, super star Rajinikanth told that he was a big fan of the film and had watched the film Onde Balliya Hoogalu 14 times during his growing up years in Bangalore and could not control the tears. M.Nageswara Rao incidentally had played a key role in recording the anecdotes of Shri Raghavendra swami during His life time and swami's travels to the length and breadth of the country. The impact of those anecdotes could be seen in the later version of Rajni's film on Raghavendra swami in Tamil.

== Cast ==
- K. S. Ashwath as Veerabhadra
- Rajashankar
- Balakrishna
- Dikki Madhavarao
- Ranga
- B. M. Venkatesh
- Ashwath Narayan
- Muniyappa
- Chandrakala as Rangi
- Jayanthi in guest appearance
- Pandari Bai in guest appearance
- B. V. Radha
- Rama
- Annapurna
- Bhujanga Rao
- Srirangamurthy
- Srinivasan
- Ramachandra Rao
- Nagaraj
- Srinath as special appearance
- Durgaprasad Rao

== Soundtrack ==
The music was composed by Satyam with lyrics written by Geethapriya.

| No. | Song | Singers | Length (m:ss) |
|---|---|---|---|
| 1 | "Riksha Gadi Mister" | P. B. Sreenivas | 04:57 |
| 2 | "Anna Ninna Sodariyanna" | S. Janaki | 04:00 |
| 3 | "Daari Kanda Bandavale" | K. J. Yesudas, S. Janaki | 04:14 |
| 4 | "Neenelli Nadevedoora" | Mohammed Rafi | 04:52 |
| 5 | "Ore Notada" | P. B. Sreenivas, B. K. Sumitra | 04:30 |
| 6 | "Yeko Yeko Yethako" | B. K. Sumitra | 04:16 |
