= Potti Veerayya =

Indian actor and comedian (1946–2021)

- Born: Gattu Veerayya c. 1946; Phanigiri, Telangana, India
- Died: 25 April 2021 (aged 74 or 75); Hyderabad, Telangana, India
- Spouse: Mallika (died in 2008)
- Children: 2

Potti Veerayya (c. 1946 – 25 April 2021) was an Indian actor and comedian who predominantly acted in Telugu films. A dwarf by birth, he acted in more than 500 films, mostly in Telugu along with Kannada, Tamil, and Malayalam films. He acted in notable films like Aggi Veerudu (1969), Tata-Manavadu (1972), Radhamma Pelli (1974), Jaganmohini (1978), Yugandhar (1979), Gaja Donga (1981), Tarzan Sundari (1983).

== Early life ==
Hailing from Phanigiri village of Suryapeta district, Telangana, he was born as Gattu Veerayya. He was a dwarf by birth and stood just two feet. He was attracted to stage plays, drama and films since his childhood. Before commencing his career as a film actor, he was a theatre artiste.

== Film career ==
His passion for acting landed him in Madras where he met actor Sobhan Babu while working in a shop selling flowers for film sets. As Veerayya was a dwarf, Sobhan Babu advised him to meet directors like B. Vittalacharya for suitable roles in their films. On his advice, Veerayya met Vittalacharya who cast him in the film Aggidora (1967) featuring Kanta Rao and N. T. Rama Rao. Later, he acted in films like Aggi Veerudu (1969), Tata-Manavadu (1972), Radhamma Pelli (1974), Jaganmohini (1978), Yugandhar (1979), Gaja Donga (1981), Attagaari Pettanam (1981), Tarzan Sundari (1988).

His characters mostly used to be that of a clown or a small demon in folklore films. He has acted in more than 500 films in Telugu, Kannada, Tamil, and Malayalam languages. During an interview, he mentioned that Raja Babu and Dasari Narayana Rao had encouraged him in the initial phase of his career.

Knowing his plight, Chiranjeevi had extended monetary help of ₹2 lakh.

== Personal life ==
He had three daughters. His youngest daughter Vijayadurga is an actor in the Telugu film industry. His wife Mallika died in 2008.

== Death ==
He died on 25 April 2021, aged 74 or 75, at a private hospital in Hyderabad due to heart-related ailments.

== Filmography ==
- Aggidora (1967)
- Aggi Veerudu (1969)
- Tata Manavadu (1972)
- Radhamma Pelli (1974)
- Jaganmohini (1978)
- Yugandhar (1979)
- Sri Rama Bantu (1979)
- Gaja Donga (1981)
- Gola Nagamma (1981)
- Attagaari Pettanam (1981)
- Mugguru Ammayila Mogudu (1983)
- Chandirani (1983)
- Tarzan Sundari (1983) as Tribal Chief
- Ee Charitra Inkenallu (1984)
- Rowdy Police (1987)
- Punya Dampathulu (1987)
- Rowdy Babai (1987)
- Samsaram Oka Chadarangam (1987) as Washerman
- Ukku Sankellu (1988)
- Brahma Puthrudu (1988)
- Pape Naa Pranam (1988)
- Mayadari Kutumbam (1995)
- 786 Khaidi Premakatha (2005)

Television

- Lady Detective
