= Sumangali (1959 film) =

- Theatrical release poster
- Directed by: M. K. R. Nambiar
- Screenplay by: En Thangai Natarajan (dialogues)
- Story by: Vaduvur Duraisami Iyengar
- Produced by: V. Thandavam
- Starring: K. Balaji; E. V. Saroja; C. S. Pandian
- Cinematography: S. S. Nathan
- Edited by: M. S. Parthasarathy
- Music by: M. Ranga Rao
- Production company: Rajeswari Films
- Release date: 14 January 1959
- Country: India
- Language: Tamil

Sumangali is a 1959 Indian Tamil language drama film directed by M. K. R. Nambiar. The film stars K. Balaji and E. V. Saroja. It was released on 14 January 1959.

== Cast ==
Male cast

- K. Balaji
- C. S. Pandian
- E. R. Sahadevan
- Natarajan
- K. Nagaiah
- Pakkirisami

Male cast (Contd.)

- Nambirajan
- Babu
- Stunt Krishnan
- K. Kannan
- Karikol Raj
- V. Namasivayam

Female cast

- E. V. Saroja
- T. K. Pushpavalli
- Baby Kanchana
- P. Mohana
- Kamala
- Mohana
- P. Saraswathi

== Production ==
The film was produced by V. Thandavam under the banner Rajeswari Films. The story was based on a novel written by Vaduvur Duraisami Iyengar. Screenplay and dialogues were written by En Thangai fame Natarajan. Cinematography was handled by S. S. Nathan while editing was done by M. S. Parthasarathy. J. Gnanayudham was in charge of art direction. Choreography was handled by Natanam Nataraj, Sampath and Chinnilal. S. S. Radhakrishnan of Bharath Studio did the still photography. Stunt master was K. Kundumani. The film was shot at Vijaya, Narasu and Newtone studios. Processing was done at Vijaya Laboratories.

== Soundtrack ==
Music was composed by M. Ranga Rao while the lyrics were penned by En Thangai Natarajan.

Song	Singer/s	Duration (m:ss)
"Vegama Poravaley"	Seerkazhi Govindarajan & K. Rani	02:54
"Aanandam, Aanandam Aandavaney"	P. Susheela	03:34
"Aeyi Erinthaan Madhanendru"	A. G. Rathnamala & Ramachandran	10:05
"Akka Magaley, Sokki Penney"	S. C. Krishnan & A. G. Rathnamala	03:12
"Manithanaaga Pirandhu"	Seerkazhi Govindarajan & S. C. Krishnan	02:53
"Vidhi Seydha Sadhiyo Athaan"	Seerkazhi Govindarajan & R. Balasaraswathi	03:05
"Kaadhal Thandha Jothi"	P. B. Srinivas & P. Leela	04:31
"Andam Kidukidungum Mandalangal"	Ramachandran, Mohana & group	00:54
"Aaduvom Naame, Vel Vel"	Ramachandran, Mohana & group	04:02
"Chinna Chinna Pullainga"	Mohana, K. Jamuna Rani, Nirmala & group	01:56
"Sodhanai Seythiddaaney"	T. V. Rathnam	03:07
"Uzhavan Viyarvaiyada...Pattikadu Endraley"	Seerkazhi Govindarajan, Shanmugasundaram, A. G. Rathnamala & group	03:45
