= Alaigal =

Alaigal (lit. 'waves' in Tamil) may refer to:

- Alaigal (film), a 1973 Indian film by C. V. Sridhar
- Alaigal (TV series), an Indian soap opera
