= Chandrakala =

Indian actress

- Born: 1950 or 1951; Uttara Kannada, Karnataka
- Died: 21 June 1999 (aged 48)
- Occupations: Actress, producer
- Years active: 1961–1978

Chandrakala was an Indian actress who appeared in Kannada, Telugu, Tamil, Malayalam and Hindi films.

== Film career ==
She debuted in Kannada films in 1963 and went on to pair with Dr. Rajkumar, Kalyan Kumar, Uday Kumar and Rajesh. In 1971, she made her debut in the Tamil movie Praptham opposite Sivaji Ganesan and Srikanth. Her most significant role was in the film Alaigal, directed by C. V. Sridhar. Her other notable films include Kaalangalil Aval Vasantham, Ulagam Sutrum Valiban and Moondru Deivangal (as Sivakumar's co-star).

== Partial filmography ==
=== Tamil ===
1. Praptham (1971) as Gowri - Debut in Tamil
2. Moondru Dheivangal (1971) as Lakshmi
3. Puguntha Veedu (1972) as Vasanthi
4. Deivamsam (1973) as Radha
5. Alaigal (1973) as Lakshmi
6. Ulagam Sutrum Valiban (1973) as Rathnadevi
7. Uravadum Nenjam (1976)
8. Kaalangalil Aval Vasantham (1976) as Kalpana
9. Ellam Avale (1977)
10. Varuvan Vadivelan (1978)
11. Vazhthungal (1978)

=== Hindi ===
1. Shola Aur Shabnam (1961) as young Sandhya
2. Arab Ka Sitara (1961)
3. Kala Jadoo (1963)
4. Black Arrow (1965)
5. Badmaash (1969)
6. Return Of Johny (1972)
7. Aarambh (1976)
8. Kaisan Banaul Sansar (1989)

=== Kannada ===
1. Sri Ramanjaneya Yuddha (1963) as Dancer
2. Jeevana Tharanga (1963)
3. Jenu Goodu (1963)...Latha
4. Navakoti Narayana (1964)
5. Subba Shastry (1966)
6. Parvathi Kalyana (1967)
7. Onde Balliya Hoogalu (1967)
8. Bedi Bandavalu (1968)
9. Rowdy Ranganna (1968)
10. Ananda Kanda (1968)
11. Punya Purusha (1969)
12. Punarjanma (1969)
13. Margadarshi (1969)
14. Manashanthi (1969)
15. Chaduranga (1969)
16. Amarabharathi (1971)
17. Sankalpa (1973)
18. Maga Mommaga (1974)
19. Onde Roopa Eradu Guna (1975)
20. Mane Belaku (1975)
21. Suli (1978)
22. Sri Raghavendra Vaibhava (1981)

=== Telugu ===
1. Sathi Sukanya (1963)
2. Visala Hrudayalu (1965)
3. Aada Paduchu (1967)...Sharada
4. Chelleli Kosam (1968)
5. Aatmiyulu (1969)...Seetha
6. Mathru Devata (1969)
7. Pratheekaram (1969)...Radha
8. Varakatnam (1969)
9. Thalli Thandrulu (1970)
10. Jai Jawan (1970)
11. Thalla? Pellama? (1970)
12. Sampoorna Ramayanamu (1971)...Sita Devi
13. Nammaka Drohulu (1971)
14. Tahsildar Gari Ammayi (1971)
15. Dussehra Bullodu (1971)...Nirmala
16. Inspector Bharya (1972)...Vimala
17. Maa Inti Velugu (1972)
18. Kiladi Bullodu (1972)
19. Tata Manavadu (1972)...Suguna
20. Kanna Thalli (1972)
21. Poolmala (1973)
22. Puttinillu Mettinillu (1973)
23. Sthree (1973)
24. Manuvu Manasu (1973)
25. Meena (1973)...Raji
26. Nomu (1974)...Parvati
27. Chakravakam (1974)
28. Uttama Illalu (1974)...Meena
29. Mugguru Ammayilu (1974)
30. Kode Nagu (1974)
31. Ammayila Sapatham (1975)
32. Iddaru Iddare (1976)
33. Oka Deepam Veligindhi (1976)
34. Kurukshetram (1977)...Rukmini
35. Jeevithamlo Vasantham (1977)...Vasantha
36. Annadammula Savaal (1978)
37. Sahasavanthudu (1978)...Raji
38. Lakshmi Pooja (1979)
39. Sri Mantralaya Raghavendra Vaibhavam (1981)

=== Malayalam ===
1. Ezhuthatha Kadha (1970) as Meena
2. Moonnupookkal (1971)
3. Aanandham Paramaanandham (1977) as Rekha
4. Aa Nimisham (1977)
5. Vayanadan Thamban (1978)
6. Aalmaaraattam (1978)

== Death ==
Chandrakala died prematurely of cancer on 21 June 1999, aged 48.
