= Bhakta Kanakadasa =

1960 film

- Directed by: Y. R. Swamy
- Screenplay by: Hunsur Krishnamurthy
- Story by: Hunsur Krishnamurthy
- Produced by: D. R. Naidu
- Starring: Dr.Rajkumar
- Cinematography: R. Madhu
- Edited by: Govinda Swamy; M.S. Parthasarathy
- Music by: M. Venkataraju
- Distributed by: Shaymprasad Movies
- Release date: 30 November 1960
- Running time: 127 minutes
- Country: India
- Language: Kannada

Bhakta Kanakadasa is a 1960 Indian Kannada language film, directed by Y. R. Swamy. It depicts the spiritual journey of Kanakadasa, a devotee of the Hindu deity Krishna, and a poet associated with the Dasa sect. The film stars Rajkumar, Krishna Kumari and Udaykumar in the major roles. This film, officially marked the 100th production or release in Kannada cinema, since its inception in 1934.

The film features musical compositions based on the works of Kanakadasa, with music composed by M. Venkataraju. The songs gained significant popularity upon release. The film was edited by Govinda Swamy and M.S. Parthasarathy.

== Plot ==
Kanaka, the chieftain of a fort, wishes to marry a woman played by Krishna Kumari, which despleases his rival, portrayed by Uday Kumar. During a climactic battle, Kanaka finds himself on the brink of defeat when Lord Krishna appears and advises him to surrender to divine grace. However, Kanaka, known for his strong temper, refuses and continues to fight.

Kanaka is severely injured during the battle but is miraculously healed by Lord Krishna. After this divine intervention, he surrenders himself to Lord Krishna and becomes a dasa (servant) of the deity.His devotion and service earn him the trust of Sri Vyasatirtha, the Royal Priest of Vijayanagar. Following Sri Vyasatirtha encouragement, Kanaka embarks on a pilgrimage to the historic Udupi Sri Krishna Temple. Upon his arrival, however, he is denied entry due to prevailing social norms.

Kanaka is accused of defying the law and is subjected to punishment. As his eyes are about to be gouged, it is believed that a miraculous event occurs: the idol of Lord Krishna at the Udupi Sri Krishna Temple is said to have turned around, breaking through the wall to offer Darshana (divine vision) to Kanaka. This event is traditionally associated with the creation of "Kanakana kindi" (Kanaka's Window), which remains a revered site.

Following this event, Kanaka is recognized as a saint by society and dedicates the rest of his life to singing praises of Lord Krishna and composing devotional works, including Mohana Tarangini and Rama Dhyaana Charitre.

== Cast ==
- Rajkumar as Kanaka Dasa/Thimmanayaka
- Udaya Kumar
- Sorat Ashwath
- Krishnakumari
- M. N. Lakshmi Devi
- Narasimharaju
- Hanumanthachar
- K. S. Ashwath
- H. R. Shastry
- M. Jayashree
- Krishna Shastry

== Soundtrack ==
Sl No.	Song title	Singer(s)
1	"Kula Kula Kulavendu"	P. B. Sreenivas
2	"Badukidenu Badukidenu"	P. B. Sreenivas
3	"Balli Balli"	S. Janaki
4	"Chinnadante Chinna"	S. Janaki
5	"Deena Naanu" (Baagilanu Teredu)	P. B. Sreenivas
6	"Eesha Ninna Charana"	P. B. Sreenivas
7	"Eethaneega Vasudevanu"	P. B. Sreenivas
8	"Enthuge Ninna Deha"	P. B. Sreenivas
9	"Shringaara Sheela"	P. B. Sreenivas, S. Janaki

== Awards ==
National Film Awards

- 1960: Certificate of Merit for Best Feature Film in Kannada
