= Vaddante Dabbu =

1954 film directed by Y. R. Swamy

- Theatrical release poster in Telugu
- Directed by: Y. R. Swamy
- Screenplay by: Vempati Sadasivabrahmam; Y. R. Swamy
- Story by: G. D. Mudugulkar
- Based on: Brewster's Millions by George Barr McCutcheon
- Produced by: Moola Narayana Swamy; H. M. Reddy (Presents)
- Starring: N. T. Rama Rao; Sowcar Janaki; Jamuna
- Cinematography: D. L. Narayana
- Edited by: M. S. Parthasarathy
- Music by: T. A. Kalyanam
- Production company: Rohini Pictures
- Release dates: 19 February 1954 (Telugu); 4 March 1954 (Tamil)
- Running time: 140 minutes
- Country: India
- Languages: Telugu; Tamil

Vaddante Dabbu (transl. Endless money) is a 1954 Indian Telugu-language screwball comedy film directed by Y. R. Swamy. It was produced by Moola Narayana Swamy and presented by H. M. Reddy under the Rohini Pictures banner. The film stars N. T. Rama Rao, Sowcar Janaki and Jamuna, with music composed by T. A. Kalyanam. It was simultaneously shot in Tamil as Panam Paduthum Padu (transl. Strains caused by money).

The film was based on the George Barr McCutcheon novel Brewster's Millions (1902). Despite originally opening to a mixed response, it attained cult status in Telugu cinema, and was remade in the same language as Babai Abbai (1985).

== Plot ==
The film follows Syam, a painter, and his close associate Rama Rao, who live together and are often engaged in borrowing money and evading creditors. Syam's artwork catches the eye of Saroja, the daughter of the wealthy Rao Saheb Hemachalapati. Saroja commissions a portrait, and the two fall in love. Impressed by Syam's talent, Rao Saheb gives him ₹1 lakh with the condition that he must spend it within 30 days, without donating or wasting the money.

Syam, guided by Rama Rao, spends the money on various activities, including horse racing, gambling, theatre plays, and building a house. As the days pass, Syam’s finances continue to grow. However, he becomes disillusioned with the pursuit of wealth and decides to return the money to Rao Saheb. Rao Saheb reveals that the purpose of the task was to teach Syam the dangers of money and help him understand its true value. The film ends with Syam and Saroja’s marriage, symbolizing his newfound understanding.

== Cast ==
- N. T. Rama Rao as Syam
- Sowcar Janaki as Saroja
- Jamuna as Rekha
- Rajanala as Rao Saheb Hemachalapathi
- Peketi Sivaram as Rama Rao
- Allu Ramalingaiah as Master Baddanki
- Hemalatha as Yashoda
- K. A. Thangavelu (Tamil version)

== Production ==
Vaddante Dabbu was adapted from George Barr McCutcheon's English-language novel Brewster's Millions (1902), and was among the earliest screwball comedies of Telugu cinema.

== Music ==
Music was composed by T. A. Kalyanam.

Telugu version

Lyrics were written by Devulapalli, Vempati Sadasivabrahmam, and Sri Sri.

Song title	Lyrics	Singers	length
"Naa Priya"	Devulapalli	Jikki	3:14
"Alladi Avatala"	Vempati Sadasivabrahmam	Jikki	3:05
"Chadavali"	Vempati Sadasivabrahmam	A. M. Rajah, P. Susheela	
"Evaro Doshulu"	Vempati Sadasivabrahmam	Rohini	
"Endukoyi"	Devulapalli	R. Balasaraswathi Devi	2:49
"Thimtalangthom"	Sri Sri	A. V. Saraswathi, Rohini, V. Ramakrishna, S. P. Kodandapani, M. V. Raju	
"Alakinchavoyi"	Devulapalli	Jikki	3:33
"Mansaemo Chalinchaneyo"	Sri Sri	R. Balasaraswathi Devi	2:55

Tamil version

The lyrics were written by Hanumantha Rao, Thanjai N. Ramaiah Dass and Guhan.

Song	Singer/s	Lyricist
"Anpanae Aasai Palithidumaa"	Jikki	
"Angaeye Arugil Adhuve"	Jikki	
"Vaadugindra Yezhai...Mannil Veezhndhum'"	Jikki	
"En Nenjin Premai Geetham"	A. M. Rajah & P. Susheela	
"Kalagam Yerpada Kaaranam"	Rohini	
"Endrum Ilaa Inbam Idhe"	R. Balasaraswathi Devi	
"Maname Sugame Perumo"	R. Balasaraswathi Devi	

== Release and reception ==
Vaddante Dabbu was released on 19 February 1954, and Panam Padathum Padu was released on 4 March 1954. Regarding the Telugu version, a critic from Zamin Ryot wrote that there is no need to be poor with the knowledge of the world, but Syam is portrayed as a dunce. This flaw in the main character makes the entire film look flawed and concluded that throughout the film, Swamy tickles the audience's funny bone. Despite originally opening to a mixed response, the Telugu version attained cult status, and was remade in the same language as Babai Abbai (1985).
