= Nuggehalli Pankaja =

Indian writer and poet (born 1929)

N. Pankaja
- Born: 2 June 1929 (age 97); Bangalore, Mysore State, British India
- Writing career
- Pen name: Nuggehalli Pankaja
- Language: Kannada, English

Nuggehalli Pankaja (born 2 June 1929) is an Indian writer and poet in the Kannada and English languages. She is considered one of the notable writers in the Kannada language. Her works include novels, short stories, and plays. She was conferred the Excellence in World Poetry Award by the International Academy for English Poetry. Some of her novels have been made into movies in Kannada.

== Novels made into films ==
(This list is incomplete, please help expanding it)

Novel	Movie	Year of release
Barale Innu Yamune?	Sipayi Ramu	1972
Gagana	Gagana (film)	1989
Malayamaruta	Malaya Marutha	1986

== Bibliography ==
=== Novels ===
- Kaveriya Arthrava
- Barale Innu Yamune?
- Ushanishi
- Malayamaruta
- Veena oh Veena!
- Mugilaminchu
- Gagana
- Namaskara Garudammanavare En Samachara?
- Balli-Moggu
- Deepa
- Goodu Bitta Hakki
- Teli Banda Bandhana
- Sandya Baruvale?
- Pratikarada Suliyalli
- Tere Sariyutu
- Alege Sikkida Yele
- Tuvvi Tuvvi, Uliyitu Gubbacchi
- Konegondu Kathe, Mulegondu Maathu
- Eradu Rembegalu
- Ondu Vasanta Rutuvinalli
- Mohinigondu Haadu
- Anuragada Seletha
- Balina Uyyale

=== Short stories ===
- Ardha Chandra
- Ippattu Varshagala Hinde
- Mother Tree
- Educating The Maid Servant

=== Plays ===
- Salome (transilation of Oscar Wilde's play 'Salome')
- Aa Ondu Vishada Ghalige (adaptation of Oscar Wilde's ' Lady Windermere’s fan')
- Aralikatte Ramachariya Eradaneya Hendati(Adaptation of Arthur Wing Pinero’s Second Mrs.Tanquery)

== Awards ==
- Karnataka Sahitya Academy award in recognition of her contribution to Kannada Literature
- Anupama Prashsti given yearly to recognized writers byLekakiyara sangha (Lady writers association).
- Community Award
- Golden Jubilee Award of Independence
- Atimabbe Award
- Shrirasa Award
- Nuggehalli Award
- Chandrakala Prashasti
- Koravanji-Aparanji Award given in recognition of Humorous works,
- Suwarna Karnataka Shri Prashasti
- Recognition of novel ‘Balli-Moggu’ by Kannada Sahitya Parishat
- All India Radio Award for the story of the drama ‘Namaskara Garudammanavare….En Samachara?’ broadcast through all stations.
- Excellence in World Poetry Award conferred by the International Academy for English Poetry.
