= Apoorva Sangama =

- Poster
- Directed by: Y. R. Swamy
- Written by: K.A. Narayan
- Screenplay by: Y. R. Swamy
- Produced by: Y. R. Swamy; Naveen Kumar
- Starring: Rajkumar; Shankar Nag; Ambika; T. N. Balakrishna; Thoogudeepa Srinivas; Vajramuni
- Cinematography: B. C. Gowrishankar
- Edited by: P. Bhaktavatsalam
- Music by: Upendra Kumar
- Distributed by: Sri Kalikamba Creations
- Release date: December 7, 1984
- Running time: 151 minutes
- Country: India
- Language: Kannada

Apoorva Sangama ( transl. Rare Rendezvous) is a 1984 Indian Kannada-language film directed by Y. R. Swamy. It stars Rajkumar, Shankar Nag and Ambika. The music for the film was composed by Upendra Kumar. "Apoorva Sangama" had a theatrical run of 16 weeks. The film is a remake of Hindi film Johny Mera Naam. Rajkumar agreed to be a part of the movie in spite of it being a remake for the sake of then financially distressed director Y.R. Swamy who has the distinction of having directed Rajkumar in most number of movies - making this just the 18th and the last remake of Rajkumar's career.

== Cast ==
- Dr. Rajkumar as Gopi Krishna / Santhosh
- Shankar Nag as Harish / Suresh
- Ambika as Tara
- T. N. Balakrishna as Bhujanga
- Thoogudeepa Srinivas as Vishwanath
- Vajramuni as Danraj / Rao Bahadur Saheb
- Pandari Bai as Sathosh and Suresh's Mother
- M. S. Umesh as Shivarama
- Sadashiva Brahmavar as Dharamraj
- Roopa Chakravarty as Mala
- Janakamma
- Lavanya
- Baby Sonal
- Dubbing Janaki as Thara's mother

== Production ==
When the film was under production, it was titled Anireekshita Milana (Unexpected Meeting).

== Soundtrack ==
Apoorva Sangama

Soundtrack album by Upendra Kumar
- Released: 1984
- Genre: Feature Film
- Length: 20:00
- Language: Kannada
- Label: MRT Music
- Director: Upendra Kumar

Upendra Kumar chronology
Hennina Sowbhagya (1984)	Apoorva Sangama (1984)	Ayyappa Sharanu (1984)

All lyrics are written by Chi. Udaya Shankar; all music is composed by Upendra Kumar.

No.	Title	Singer(s)	Length
1.	"Thaara O Thaara"	Dr.Rajkumar, S. Janaki	4:17
2.	"Aralide Thanu Mana"	Dr.Rajkumar, S. Janaki	3:57
3.	"Bangari"	Dr.Rajkumar	4:09
4.	"Ninnegintha Indhu Chenna"	Vani Jairam	4:19
5.	"Bhagya Ennale"	Dr.Rajkumar, Ramesh	3:17
Total length:			20:00
