= Ondre Kulam =

- Poster
- Directed by: N. Krishnaswamy
- Screenplay by: S. D. Sundharam; V. Seetharaman; Ku. Sa. Krishnamoorthy
- Story by: Sathasiva Brahmam
- Produced by: N. Krishnaswamy
- Starring: R. S. Manohar; Madhuri Devi; S. V. Sahasranamam; K. Sarangapani
- Cinematography: Balu
- Edited by: M. S. Parthasarathy
- Music by: M. V. Ranga Rao; S. V. Venkatraman
- Production company: Triveni Pictures
- Release date: 20 April 1956
- Running time: 164 minutes
- Country: India
- Language: Tamil

Ondre Kulam (transl. Community is one only) is a 1956 Indian Tamil-language drama film directed by N. Krishnaswamy and edited by M. S. Parthasarathy. The film stars R. S. Manohar and Madhuri Devi. This film's title was named by former Tamil Nadu Chief Minister K.Kamaraj.

== Cast ==
List adapted from the database of Film News Anandan.

Male cast

- R. S. Manohar
- S. V. Sahasranamam
- K. Sarangapani
- J. P. Chandrababu

Female cast

- Maduri Devi
- K. R. Chellam
- T. V. Kumudhini

== Production ==
The film was produced and directed by N. Krishnaswamy. Sathasiva Brahmam wrote the story while the dialogues were written by S. D. Sundharam, V. Seetharaman and Ku. Sa. Krishnamoorthy. Balu was in charge of Cinematography while the editing was done by M.S. Parthasarathy. Art direction was K. R. Sarma and the still photography was done by S. V. Gopal Rao.

== Soundtrack ==
Music was composed by M. V. Ranga Rao and S. V. Venkatraman. One song by Subramania Bharathiyar and another song by Poet Auwaiyar were included in the film.

| Song | Singer/s | Lyricist | MD | Duration (m:ss) |
|---|---|---|---|---|
| "Jaathigal Illaiyadi Paappa" | A. P. Komala | Subramania Bharathiyar | M. V. Ranga Rao | |
| "Jaathi Irandoliya" | A. P. Komala | Auwaiyar | M. V. Ranga Rao | |
| "Anda Pagiranda Akilandeswari" | M. L. Vasanthakumari | | M. V. Ranga Rao | |
| "Thiruvarul Purivai Jaganmatha" | M. L. Vasanthakumari | Ku. Sa. Krishnamoorthy | S. V. Venkatraman | 03:09 |
| "Hailesa, Hailesa, Hailesa" | Jikki, Vasantha, Sundaramma & Sirkazhi Govindarajan | Ku. Sa. Krishnamoorthy | S. V. Venkatraman | 03:16 |
| "Thulliye Odum Pulli Maan Polae" | Jikki | Ku. Sa. Krishnamoorthy | S. V. Venkatraman | 02:46 |
| "Mangkilai Maele Poonguyil Kooviyadhu" | V. N. Sundaram, N. L. Ganasaraswathi, K. Rani, M. S. Rajeswari & Kalyani | Surabhi | S. V. Venkatraman | 06:35 |
| "Sirippu Varaadho" | K. Rani | V. Seetharaman | S. V. Venkatraman | 03:14 |
| "Naalum Theriyaame Naa Koosaame" | S. V. Ponnusamy & G. Kasthuri | V. Seetharaman | S. V. Venkatraman | |
| "Ondre Kulam.... En Pirandhai Kanne" | S. V. Venkatraman | V. Seetharaman | S. V. Venkatraman | 03:08 |
| "Unnai Ninaindhe Ullam" | Jikki | | S. V. Venkatraman | 03:16 |
