= Jari Bidda Jana =

1980 Indian film directed by Y. R. Swamy

- Directed by: Y. R. Swamy
- Written by: Chi. Udaya Shankar (dialogues)
- Screenplay by: Y. R. Swamy
- Story by: H. S. Tharanala
- Produced by: J. Chandulal Jain; B. Deepak Chand; Naveenchand Shah; A. Krishnamurthy
- Starring: Lokesh; Jayanthi; Ashok; Rekha Rao
- Cinematography: R. Madhusudan
- Edited by: R. Rajan
- Music by: T. G. Lingappa
- Production company: Thirupathi Jain Films
- Distributed by: Thirupathi Jain Films
- Release date: 16 October 1980
- Running time: 134 min
- Country: India
- Language: Kannada

Jari Bidda Jana is a 1980 Indian Kannada-language film, directed by Y. R. Swamy and produced by J. Chandulal Jain, B. Deepak Chand, Naveenchand Shah and A. Krishnamurthy. The film stars Lokesh, Jayanthi, Ashok and Rekha Rao. The film has musical score by T. G. Lingappa.

== Cast ==
- Lokesh
- Jayanthi
- Ashok
- Rekha Rao
- Srinivasa Murthy
- Pramila Joshai
- Thoogudeepa Srinivas
- Musuri Krishnamurthy
- Rajanand in Guest appearance
- Uma Shivakumar in Guest appearance

== Soundtrack ==
The music was composed by T. G. Lingappa.

No.	Song	Singers	Lyrics	Length (m:ss)
1	"Yelle Madhavanu"	S. Janaki	Chi. Udaya Shankar	04:19
2	"Kogileyu Haaduthidhe"	Vani Jairam	Chi. Udaya Shankar	04:03
3	"Halliya Thotadi"	Vani Jairam, S. P. Balasubrahmanyam	Chi. Udaya Shankar	04:34
4	"Nanage Nanade Nyaya"	S. P. Balasubrahmanyam	Chi. Udaya Shankar	04:29
