= Onde Roopa Eradu Guna =

- Directed by: A. M. Sameevulla
- Written by: R. N. Jayagopal (dialogues)
- Screenplay by: A. M. Sameevulla
- Story by: A. M. Sameevulla
- Produced by: A. M. Sameevulla
- Starring: Vishnuvardhan; Bhavani; Chandrakala; Chandrashekar
- Cinematography: K. Janakiram
- Edited by: T. R. Srinivasulu
- Music by: Salil Chowdhury
- Production company: Bawa Movies
- Distributed by: Bawa Movies
- Release date: 30 July 1975
- Running time: 143 min
- Country: India
- Language: Kannada

Onde Roopa Eradu Guna is a 1975 Indian Kannada film, directed by A. M. Sameevulla and produced by A. M. Sameevulla. The film stars Vishnuvardhan, Bhavani, Chandrakala and Chandrashekhar in lead roles. The film had musical score by Salil Chowdhury.

== Cast ==
- Vishnuvardhan in dual roles as Ashok and Vikram
- Bhavani as Rajani
- Bharathi in Special Appearance
- Chandrakala as Shanthi
- Chandrashekhar as Chandrashekhar
- Ambareesh as Daadaa in Jail
- Shivaram as Padmanabhayya, Rajani father
- Sampath as Anantha Murthy, Ashok and Shanthi father
- Balakrishna as Kathri, Kittu
- Narasimharaju Chathri, Juttu
- M. Jayashree as Susheela, Ashok and Shanthi mother
- Chethan Ramarao
- Manmatha Rao
- Raghu
- Shyam
- Nandagopal
- Muniyappa
- Maccheri
- Halam
- Tiger Prabhakr in a fight scene takes photo of Chandru

== Soundtrack ==
shiva
