= Kaalangalil Aval Vasantham (1976 film) =

- Theatrical release poster
- Directed by: S. P. Muthuraman
- Screenplay by: Panchu Arunachalam
- Story by: C. N. Muthu
- Produced by: S. Baskar
- Starring: R. Muthuraman; Chandrakala; Srividya
- Cinematography: Babu
- Edited by: R. Vittal
- Music by: Vijaya Bhaskar
- Production company: Vijayabaskar Productions
- Release date: 13 April 1976
- Country: India
- Language: Tamil

Kaalangalil Aval Vasantham (transl. Among seasons, she is spring) is a 1976 Indian Tamil-language film directed by S. P. Muthuraman and produced by S. Baskar. The screenplay was written by Panchu Arunachalam from a story by C. N. Muthu. The film stars R. Muthuraman, Chandrakala and Srividya. It was released on 13 April 1976.

== Plot ==
Sisters Rajalakshmi (Raji) and Kalpana live with their father, and are often visited by their uncle Santhanam from Singapore. Kalpana, the younger one is in love with Ravi. Raji is about to be married, bur the groom dies in an accident, leaving her mentally troubled obsessing herself with marriage and groom. On the persuasion of her father, Kalpana is asked to marry in the hope that at least his younger daughter would be happy. With initial hesitance she later agrees. Soon after she is married her father dies, leaving the mentally challenged sister in her and his son in law's responsibility.

The three of them shift to Ooty, where situations worsen and it becomes difficult to look after her sister. They consult a psychiatrist who says that she has a superficial disorder, which could be cured by getting her married since the cause for this trouble was due to the marriage that did not take place. No one wishes to marry the mentally challenged Raji.

Troubled, Kalpana decides to have her husband, Ravi, marry her sister. After initially disapproving Ravi marries Raji for the sake of his wife. This slowly heals Raji. She believes that Ravi is her husband and one fine day she is completely cured and even recovers her memory. Kalpana is rejoiced to see her sister back to her normal self. She tells her what happened but deliberately conceals the truth that she got her husband married to her sister. The situation deteriorates when Raji discovers that her husband is having an affair with her sister. Her uncle too comes to visit her and she confides to him about her ill fate. He knows the truth but is helpless.

When Ravi is critically injured, Kalpana in panic starts hospitalising her husband forgetting that her sister is near. Raji is shocked to learn that her sister is the wife of her husband. She pretends to be mentally deranged and goes to Singapore with her uncle.

== Cast ==
- R. Muthuraman as Ravi
- Chandrakala as Kalpana
- Srividya as Rajalakshmi (Raji)
- S. A. Ashokan as Santhanam
- Senthamarai
- Jeyachandran
- Thengai Srinivasan
- Manorama as Kalyani
- A. Sakunthala as Radha
- Vijayakumar as Kumar (cameo)

== Production ==
The film's shoot began on 28 September 1975 at Modern Theatres. After shooting some scenes at Modern Theatres, the team decided to shift the rest of the film at Ooty as Arunachalam wrote the script in such a way that the story is set there. The first day of shoot was held at Lovedale Railway Station then next day a marriage procession was shot at a lake near Kamaraj Nagar. The scene where Muthuraman saves Srividya from Jayachandran was shot at a dam near Pykara while the song "Mudhal Mudhal Varum" was shot falls near Samiyar Thottam. The film's shoot ended in April 1976.

== Soundtrack ==
Music was by Vijaya Bhaskar. The song "Anbenum Sudaral" is set to the Carnatic raga Poorvikalyani.

Song	Singers	Length
"Paadum Vandae"	Vani Jairam	04:09
"Muthal Muthal"	S. P. Balasubrahmanyam, Vani Jairam	03:59
"Manamagale Manamagale"	Vani Jairam	04:17
"Manamagale Manamagale" — Sad	Vani Jairam	04:16
"Anbenum Sudaral"	Vani Jairam	02:24
"Paadhum"	Vani Jairam	04:18

== Critical reception ==
Kanthan of Kalki appreciated S. P. Muthuraman's direction and cast performances, especially Srividya's, but felt R. Muthuraman was underutilised and criticised the writing. Naagai Dharuman of Navamani praised the direction, acting and cinematography.
