= Suntan (1976 film) =

- Poster
- Directed by: Mohan Segal
- Written by: S. M. Abbas; Verma Malik (lyrics)
- Screenplay by: Dasari Narayana Rao
- Story by: Dasari Narayana Rao
- Based on: Tata Manavadu (1972)
- Produced by: Mohan Segal
- Starring: Jeetendra; Rekha; Ashok Kumar
- Cinematography: Kamalakar Rao
- Edited by: Ramakant Dabhilkar
- Music by: Laxmikant–Pyarelal
- Production company: Delux Films
- Release date: 20 July 1976
- Running time: 162 minutes
- Country: India
- Language: Hindi

Suntan (transl. Progeny) is a 1976 Hindi-language drama film, produced & directed by Mohan Segal on Delux Films banner. Starring Jeetendra, Rekha, Ashok Kumar and music composed by Laxmikant–Pyarelal. The film is a remake of Telugu film Tata Manavadu (1972), starring S. V. Ranga Rao, Raja Babu, Vijaya Nirmala.

== Cast ==
- Ashok Kumar as Dinanath Malhotra
- Jeetendra as Ravi Malhotra
- Rekha as Sarita
- Nirupa Roy as Tulsi
- Satyendra Kapoor as Kishore Malhotra
- Utpal Dutt as Advocate Baldev Raj
- Bindu as Lata Malhotra
- Johnny Walker
- Master Raju as Young Ravi

== Soundtrack ==
Laxmikant-Pyarelal composed the film's music while Verma Malik wrote all the songs.

Song	Singer
"Pappu Ki Mummy, Tu Badi Nikammi, Teri Jaan Ko"	Kishore Kumar, Asha Bhosle
"Aaj Khushi Se Jhum Raha" - 1	Asha Bhosle
"Aaj Khushi Se Jhum Raha" - 2	Asha Bhosle
"Laaton Ke Bhoot Baaton Se"	Asha Bhosle
"Jawani Ke Din Chaar"	Asha Bhosle
"Tu Mile To Poochhoon"	Mukesh
