= Chand Par Chadayee =

1967 film by T. P. Sundaram

- Poster
- Directed by: T. P. Sundaram
- Produced by: T. P. Sundaram
- Starring: Dara Singh; Anwar Hussain; Bhagwan; G. Ratna; Padma Khanna
- Cinematography: M. Krishnasamy
- Edited by: Joshi; M. S. Parthasarathy
- Music by: Usha Khanna
- Production company: Cauvery Productions
- Release date: 1967
- Running time: 150 minutes
- Country: India
- Language: Hindi

Chand Par Chadayee (English: Trip to Moon) is a 1967 Indian Hindi-language science fiction film produced and directed by T. P. Sundaram. The film stars Dara Singh, Anwar Hussain, Bhagwan, G. Ratna and Padma Khanna.

== Plot ==
After landing on the Moon, the astronaut Anand and his associate Bhagu face off against many warriors and monsters from another planet.

== Cast ==
- Dara Singh as Anand
- Anwar Hussain as Barahatu
- Bhagwan as Bhagu
- G. Ratna as Shimoga
- Padma Khanna as Simi

== Production ==
Chand Par Chadayee was directed by T. P. Sundaram, who also produced it under Cauvery Productions. Cinematography was handled by M. Krishnasamy, and the editing by Joshi and M. S. Parthasarathy. The writer of the film is not credited onscreen, while Balakrishna Monj wrote the dialogues.

== Soundtrack ==
The soundtrack was composed by Usha Khanna, while S. H. Bihari and Asad Bhopali were lyricists.

| No. | Title | Length |
