= Renuka Mahatme =

- Directed by: Y. R. Swamy
- Produced by: H. M. Reddy
- Starring: R. Nagendra Rao; Pandari Bai; Narasimharaju
- Cinematography: D. L. Narayana
- Music by: H. R. Padmanabha Shashtri
- Release date: 1956
- Country: India
- Language: Kannada

Renuka Mahatme is a 1956 Indian Kannada film, directed by Y. R. Swamy and produced by H. M. Reddy. The film stars R. Nagendra Rao, Pandari Bai and Narasimharaju in the lead roles. The film has musical score by H. R. Padmanabha Shashtri.

== Cast ==
- R. Nagendra Rao
- Pandari Bai
- Narasimharaju
