= Bhale Raja =

- Directed by: Y. R. Swamy
- Written by: Puvai Krishnan
- Screenplay by: Y. R. Swamy
- Produced by: Yajaman Mothi Veeranna
- Starring: Dr. Rajkumar; Jayanthi; Ranga; Nagappa; Eshwarappa
- Cinematography: R Madhu
- Edited by: R Hanumantha Rao
- Music by: Satyam
- Production company: Sri Rajeshwari Pictures
- Distributed by: Sri Rajeshwari Pictures
- Release date: 8 August 1969
- Country: India
- Language: Kannada

Bhale Raja is a 1969 Indian Kannada-language film, directed by Y. R. Swamy and produced by Yajaman Mothi Veeranna. The film stars Dr. Rajkumar, Jayanthi, Ranga, Nagappa and Eshwarappa. The film had musical score by Satyam.

== Cast ==
- Rajkumar as Shivaraj
- Jayanthi as Maala/Rani
- Ranga as Shyam
- B. V. Radha as Pushpalatha
- Nagappa
- Eshwarappa
- Mahadevappa
- Narayan
- M. Jayashree as Parvathamma
- Jaikumari
- Baby Sunitha
- Baby Padmashree
- Master Prabhakar as young Shivaraj
- K. S. Ashwath in Guest Appearance
- M. P. Shankar in Guest Appearance

== Soundtrack ==
The music was composed by Satyam with lyrics by Sorat Ashwath and Kanagal Prabhakar Shastri.

	Song	Singer
1	Naane Baalina Joker	P. B. Srinivas
2	Chaku Mukhi Hudugi	S. P. Balasubramanyam
3	Ye Mukka Thaa Rokka	P. Susheela
4	Kannu Eneno Katheyella Helithu	P Susheela
5	O Iniya O Geleya	P Susheela
