= Sipayi Ramu =

- Directed by: Y. R. Swamy
- Written by: Nuggehalli Pankaja
- Screenplay by: Basumani
- Based on: Barale Innu Yamune? by Nuggehalli Pankaja
- Starring: Rajkumar; Leelavathi; Aarathi; K. S. Ashwath; Shivaram; Vajramuni; Thoogudeepa Srinivas
- Cinematography: R. Chittibabu
- Edited by: P. Bhakthavathsalam
- Music by: Upendra Kumar
- Production company: Sri Bhagavathi Productions
- Release date: 1972
- Running time: 161 minutes
- Country: India
- Language: Kannada

Sipayi Ramu is 1972 Indian Kannada language film directed by Y. R. Swamy, based on the novel Barale Innu Yamune? by Nuggehalli Pankaja. It stars Rajkumar, Leelavathi and Aarathi. The supporting cast includes K. S. Ashwath, Shivaram, Vajramuni and Thoogudeepa Srinivas. At the 1971-72 Karnataka State Film Awards, the film was awarded the Third Best Film and Best Actress (Leelavathi).

The 2012 Hindi movie Paan Singh Tomar, based on the life of Indian soldier turned dacoit Paan Singh Tomar had a similar story line. Portions of the movie were shot in the Chambal Valley.

== Cast ==
- Rajkumar as Ramu alias Ram Singh
- Leelavathi as Yamuna, Ramu's wife
- Aarathi as Champa
- K. S. Ashwath as Hari Singh
- Shivaram as Lakhan Singh
- Vajramuni as Sudhakar
- Thoogudeepa Srinivas as Mangal Singh
- Shakti Prasad as Shetty
- Y. R. Ashwath Narayana
- B. Jaya
- M. Jayashree as Janaki
- Baby Sunitha (Cameo)

== Soundtrack ==
The music of the film was composed by Upendra Kumar, with lyrics written by R. N. Jayagopal. The tune of the song "Baaji Katti Nodu" was reused in the song "Baare Mandya Henne" from the 2004 Kannada movie Kanasina Loka.

| Track # | Song | Singer(s) |
|---|---|---|
| 1 | "Thangaali Sangeetha Haadide" | P. Susheela |
| 2 | "Kanna Notadalle Nee Kaadabeda" | P. Susheela |
| 3 | "Kokorekoko Kokorekoko Ko" | S. P. Balasubrahmanyam, L. R. Eswari |
| 4 | "Nidireyu Sadaa Eko Doora" | P. B. Sreenivas, P. Susheela |
| 5 | "Ellige Payana Yaavudo Daari" | P. B. Sreenivas |
