= Maga Mommaga =

- Directed by: Y. R. Swamy
- Written by: Dasari Narayana Rao
- Screenplay by: Y. R. Swamy
- Based on: Tata Manavadu (1972)
- Produced by: R. Panduranga Naidu; D. R. Raghavendra Naidu
- Starring: Dwarakish; K. S. Ashwath; Vajramuni; Balakrishna
- Cinematography: S. V. Srikanth
- Edited by: T. P. Velayudhan
- Music by: M. Ranga Rao
- Production company: Shyamprasad Combines
- Distributed by: Shyamprasad Combines
- Release date: 1974
- Country: India
- Language: Kannada

Maga Mommaga is a 1974 Indian Kannada-language film, directed by Y. R. Swamy and produced by R. Panduranga Naidu and D. R. Raghavendra Naidu. The film stars Dwarakish, K. S. Ashwath, Vajramuni and Balakrishna in the lead roles. The film has musical score by M. Ranga Rao. The film was a remake of the Telugu film Tata Manavadu.

== Cast ==
- Dwarakish
- K. S. Ashwath
- Vajramuni
- Balakrishna
- M. S. Sathya
- Hanumanthachar
- Master Arun
- Chandrakala
- Leelavathi
- Shailashree
- M. N. Lakshmidevi
- Vijayakala
- Baby Shyam
- Chethan
- Ashwath Narayan
- T. Thimmayya
- Sriram
- Bheema Rao
- Thyagaraj Urs
- Ramanna
- Mohan
- Manohar
- T. Raju
- Padmanabha Rao
- Honnappa
- Kannada Raju

== Soundtrack ==
The music was composed by M. Ranga Rao with lyrics written by Chi. Udayashankar and Vijaya Naarasimha.

No.	Song	Singers	Length (m:ss)
1	"Chamundeswari"	L. R. Eswari	03:26
2	"Irulali Kanasaagalu"	Susheel, Maheshwar	03:17
3	"Irulella Oorsutthi"	S. P. Balasubrahmanyam	03:27
