= Mane Belaku =

- Directed by: Y. R. Swamy
- Written by: K. Vishwanath (Remake)
- Produced by: A. R. S. Sharma
- Starring: Chandrashekar; K. S. Ashwath; Balakrishna; Ramgopal
- Cinematography: S. V. Srikanth; S. N. Chandramohan; V. K. Kannan
- Edited by: P. Bhakthavathsalam
- Music by: M. Ranga Rao
- Production company: Sovereign Cine Enterprises
- Distributed by: Sovereign Cine Enterprises
- Release date: 21 May 1975
- Country: India
- Language: Kannada

Mane Belaku is a 1975 Indian Kannada-language film, directed by Y. R. Swamy and produced by A. R. S. Sharma. The film stars Chandrashekar, K. S. Ashwath, Balakrishna and Ramgopal. The film has musical score by M. Ranga Rao.

== Cast ==
- Chandrashekar
- K. S. Ashwath
- Balakrishna
- Ramgopal
- M. S. Sathya
- Kuppuraj
- Dheerendra Gopal
- Bheemaraj
- Shivakumar
- Raghava
- Raju
- Amar
- Master nataraj
- Vittal
- Bangalore Nagesh in Guest Appearance
- Chandrakala
- B. V. Radha
- Ramaprabha
- B. Jayashree
- M. N. Lakshmidevi
- Papamma
- Baby Madhushree
- Rajesh in Guest Appearance

== Soundtrack ==
The music was composed by M. Ranga Rao.

No.	Song	Singers	Lyrics	Length (m:ss)
1	"Malle Hoove Naachidhe"	S. P. Balasubrahmanyam, P. Susheela	Chi. Udaya Shankar	03:31
