= Praptham =

- Theatrical release poster
- Directed by: Savitri
- Story by: Acharya Aatreya; Mullapudi Venkata Ramana
- Produced by: Savitri
- Starring: Sivaji Ganesan; Savitri
- Cinematography: Sekar–Singh
- Edited by: A. Dhandapani
- Music by: M. S. Viswanathan
- Production company: Sri Savithri Productions
- Release date: 14 April 1971
- Country: India
- Language: Tamil

Praptham (transl. Destiny) is a 1971 Indian Tamil-language film, directed and produced by Savitri. The film stars Sivaji Ganesan and Savitri. It is a remake of the 1964 Telugu film Mooga Manasulu. The film was released on 14 July 1971, and became a box-office bomb.

== Cast ==
- Sivaji Ganesan as Kannan
- Savitri as Radha
- S. V. Ranga Rao as Zamindar
- M. N. Nambiar as Raju
- Srikanth as Ramu/Thiyagarajan
- Chandrakala as Gowri
- Nagesh as Ponnan
- C. K. Saraswathi as Rama
- Senthamarai as Church father
- S.R. Janaki as Aaya

== Production ==
After watching Mooga Manasulu, Savitri wanted to remake it in Tamil, produce it and direct it. Gemini Ganesan, then romantically linked to her, warned her against doing so, describing it as an acid test, but Savitri refused to comply. Besides directing and producing, Savitri also was the lead actress, over Ganesan's objections. The film was mostly shot on an island between Kakinada and Amalapuram.

== Soundtrack ==
The music was composed by M. S. Viswanathan, with lyrics by Kannadasan. The song "Sandhanathil Nalla" is set in Madhyamavati raga.

Song	Singers	Length
"Sondam Eppodum"	T. M. Soundararajan, P. Susheela	05:10
"Sala Sala Aathottam"	L. R. Eswari	04:25
"Sandanathil Nalla Vasam"	T. M. Soundararajan, P. Susheela	03:30
"Nethu Paricha roja"	T. M. Soundararajan	02:25
"Idhu Margazhi Madham"	L. R. Eswari	05:30
"Thalattu Padi"	T. M. Soundararajan	02:25

== Release and reception ==
Praptham was released on 14 April 1971, Puthandu and became a box-office bomb, partly due to releasing on the same day as another Sivaji Ganesan film, Sumathi En Sundari. It caused a massive impediment in Savitri's career and led to her downfall. Despite this, Viswanathan won the Chennai Film Fans' Association Award for Best Music Composer.
