= Y. R. Swamy =

Indian Kannada-language film director and screenwriter (1927-2002)

- Born: c. 1927; Chitradurga, Kingdom of Mysore, British India
- Died: 21 October 2002 (aged 74–75); Pune, India
- Other name: Y. R. Swami
- Occupations: Film director, screenwriter

Y. R. Swamy (c. 1927 – 21 October 2002) was an Indian film director and screenwriter who worked primarily Kannada cinema. He directed over 35 films in his career, 18 of which came in films that stars Dr. Rajkumar in the lead role. He also holds the record for directing Dr. Rajkumar for the highest no. of times — eighteen.

Swamy's first film as a director came in the 1953 Telugu film, Pratigna. Since then, he directed films in the Kannada language and mostly in the mythological genre and with a social connect. His popular films include Bhakta Kanakadasa (1960), Katari Veera (1966), Paropakari (1970), Sipayi Ramu (1972) and Bhale Huchcha (1972). Recognizing his contribution to Kannada cinema, he was awarded the 1990–91 Puttanna Kanagal Award.

== Career ==
Swamy's role as Prahlada, a mythological Indian boy-saint, marked his entry into films in the early 1950s. Around the time, he worked as an assistant to his adoptive father and filmmaker H. M. Reddy, who directed films in Telugu and Tamil languages. Swamy's directorial debut came in the 1953 Telugu film Pratigna, a film that Reddy produced, starring Kanta Rao (debut as a hero) and Savitri with Rajanala debuting as a villain. Following this, he directed Vaddante Dabbu starring NTR, Peketi Sivaram, Jamuna and Sowcar Janaki and other films before entering Kannada cinema as an independent director with the 1956 film Renuka Devi. His next directorial was the 1960 film Bhakta Kanakadasa that had Rajkumar playing the lead role of Kanakadasa, a 16th-century Kannada poet. The film was a massive success during its time and is seen as a landmark film in Kannada cinema.

Alongside directing, Swamy also wrote the screenplay to films such as Swarna Gowri (1962), Katari Veera (1966) and Bhale Raja (1969), also producing the latter. He would go on to direct other films such as Sipayi Ramu (1972), Bhale Huchcha (1972), Mooruvare Vajragalu (1973), Devara Kannu (1975), Pavana Ganga (1977) and Apoorva Sangama (1984). The 1991 film Bangaradantha Maga marked his last as director.

== Filmography ==
- Pratigne (1953)
- Vanjam (1953)
- Vaddante Dabbu (1954)
- Panam Paduthum Paadu (1954)
- Renuka Mahatme (1956)
- Bhakta Kanakadasa (1960)
- Swarna Gowri (1962)
- Jenu Goodu (1963)
- Muriyada Mane (1964)
- Vathsalya (1965)
- Katari Veera (1966)
- Sathi Sukanya (1967)
- Muddu Meena (1967)
- Mamathe (1968)
- Atthegondu Kala Sosegondu Kala (1968)
- Bhale Raja (1969)
- Bhale Jodi (1970)
- Devara Makkalu (1970)
- Paropakari (1970)
- Sipayi Ramu (1972)
- Bhale Huchcha (1972)
- Nanda Gokula (1972)
- Bidugade (1973)
- Swyamvara (1973)
- Mooruvare Vajragalu (1973)
- Maga Mommaga (1974)
- Mane Belaku (1975)
- Devara Kannu (1975)
- Aparadhi (1976)
- Pavana Ganga (1977)
- Thayigintha Devarilla (1977)
- Kudure Mukha (1978)
- Muyyige Muyyi (1978)
- Pakka Kalla (1979)
- Atthege Thakka Sose (1979)
- Savathiya Neralu (1979)
- Jari Bidda Jana (1980)
- Apoorva Sangama (1984)
- Bangaradantha Maga (1991)
