= Nirdoshi (1951 film) =

- Telugu poster
- Directed by: H. M. Reddy
- Produced by: H. M. Reddy
- Starring: Anjali Devi; Mukkamala Krishna Murthy; G. Varalakshmi; Lakshmikantam; Kanta Rao; Kaikala Satyanarayana
- Cinematography: P. L. Roy
- Edited by: M.S. Parthasarathy
- Music by: Ghantasala; H. R. Padmanabha Sastry
- Release date: 1951
- Running time: 186 minutes
- Country: India
- Languages: Telugu; Tamil

Nirdoshi (transl. Blameless) is a 1951 Telugu-language film produced and directed by H. M. Reddy. Mukkamala Krishna Murthy played the role of the hero whereas Anjali Devi played a double role. The film was simultaneously shot in Tamil as Niraparadhi. The Rai Brothers (P. L. Rai and Viswanatha Rai) worked as cinematographers behind the camera and Ghantasala as the music director. The film was edited by M.S. Parthasarathy

== Cast ==
- Mukkamala Krishna Murthy as Vijay
- Anjali Devi as Nirmala
- G. Varalakshmi as Tara
- Kona Prabhakara Rao
- Lakshmikantam
- Tadepalli Lakshmi Kanta Rao
- Kaikala Satyanarayana
- Doraiswamy
- Chandrashekhar
- Madhu
- Pandit Rao

== Production ==
As Mukkamala Krishna Murthy could not speak Tamil, director H. M. Reddy appointed Sivaji Ganesan as a dubbing artiste. Ganesan was a stage actor and not much known at that time. The film was edited by M.S. Parthasarathy.

== Songs ==
=== Telugu ===
All music is composed by Ghantasala.

No.	Title	Singer(s)	Length
1.	"Swagatam Swagatam"	Ghantasala, Sundaramma

=== Tamil ===
Music was composed by Ghantasala and Padmanabha Sastri while the lyrics were penned by M. S. Subramaniam.

Song	Singer/s	Duration (m:ss)
"Logamaiyaa Logamaam"	A. V. Saraswathi	02:27
"Sarasa Sangeethamadhil.... Kannaalaa"	G. Varalakshmi	02:53
"Aasai Machan O Nesa Machan"	A. P. Komala & Group	03:01
"Swagatham Sadhi Saamrajyam"	Ghantasala & Sundaramma	
"Kaattukulle Kuruvi Ottum"	M. S. Subramaniam	
"Hrudhayame Needhi"		
"Laali Laali Kanne Thaalelo"	Jikki	02:34
"Inba Vaazhvil Thunbama"		
"Vidhiyaale Vanameha Seedhai"	M. S. Rama Rao	02:50
"Naane Raaniye, Kalaivaaniye"	G. Varalakshmi	01:57
"Bhaaratha Devi Jeganthanil"	Jikki & Ghantasala	02:34

== Reception ==
Film historian Randor Guy wrote in 2008 that the film is "Remembered for the impressive performance of Anjali Devi in a difficult double role and the arresting screen presence of G. Varalakshmi."
