= Vanjam =

- Theatrical release poster
- Directed by: Y. R. Swamy
- Screenplay by: N. Seetharaman (dialogues)
- Story by: H. M. Reddy; N. Seetharaman
- Produced by: M. M. Reddy
- Starring: Kantha Rao; Savithri; Gummadi; K. Sarangapani; Girija
- Cinematography: D. L. Narayan; V. K. P. Maniam
- Edited by: S. D. N. Krishna
- Music by: T. A. Kalyanam
- Production company: Rohini Pictures
- Distributed by: Rajsri Pictures
- Release date: 5 December 1953
- Running time: 184 minutes
- Country: India
- Language: Tamil

Vanjam (transl. Revenge) is a 1953 Indian Tamil-language film directed by Y. R. Swamy. The film stars Kantha Rao, Gummadi, Savithri and Girija. It was released on 4 December 1953.

== Cast ==
List adapted from the database of Film News Anandan.

Male cast

- Kantha Rao
- Gummadi
- K. Sarangapani
- Rajnala

Female cast

- Savithri
- Girija

== Production ==
The film was produced by M. M. Reddy and directed by Y. R. Swamy. H. M. Reddy wrote the story along with N. Seetharaman who also written the dialogues. D. L. Narayan and V. K. B. Maniam were in charge of cinematography while the editing was done by S. D. N. Krishna. L. V. Mantri and A. V. Dharma Rao handled the art direction. Choreography was by Chopra and Vembatti Satyam. Stunt Swaminathan was the Stunt master. Still photography was done by P. C. M. Eswar Babu.

The film was also produced in Telugu with the title Pratigna.

== Soundtrack ==
Music was composed by T. A. Kalyanam while the lyrics were written by Guhan.

Song	Singer/s	Duration (m:ss)
"Vellumaa Dharmam"		
"Aanandamaen Ivvaanandham"	T. S. Bhagavathi	02:33
"Varaporaar Idho Varaporaar"	A. P. Komala	02:52
"Thulliye Odumae Vaazhvumae"	A. M. Rajah	02:49
"Mayangaadhe Manidhaa"	Rohini	03:03
"Maname Nee Kalangidaadhe"		
"O! Thalukku Maamaa"	Rohini & Gajalakshmi	03:20
