= Punarjanma (1969 film) =

- Directed by: Peketi Shivaram
- Written by: Tha Ra Su (dialogues)
- Screenplay by: Tha Ra Su
- Story by: Tha Ra Su
- Starring: Rajkumar; Jayanthi; Chandrakala; T. N. Balakrishna
- Cinematography: R. Chittibabu
- Edited by: P. Bhakthavathsalam
- Music by: Dulal Sen
- Production company: Sri Bhagavathi Art Productions
- Distributed by: Sri Bhagavathi Art Productions
- Release date: 2 June 1969
- Running time: 140 min
- Country: India
- Language: Kannada

Punarjanma ( transl. Reincarnation) is a 1969 Indian Kannada-language film, directed by Peketi Shivaram. The film stars Rajkumar, Jayanthi, Chandrakala and T. N. Balakrishna. The film has musical score by Dulal Sen. The movie is based on the novel Saakumagalu by Ta.Ra.Su.

== Plot ==
Chenna (Rajkumar) and Honna (Ranga) are brothers in a small village live with their Mother (Jayashree). Chenna is married to Leela (Jayanthi) and works with his brother on their land as a farmer. Honna is still childish and not mentally mature (innocent). Poojarappa (Balakrishna) is the chief priest for the temple in the village and Chikka Poojarappa is his accomplice. Naagi (Chandrakala) is an orphan and is regarded as someone who brings bad luck to people.

At one point Poojarappa is beating up Naagi, since she showed up at his door in the morning and is rescued by Honna, which does not sit well with Poojarappa. Chikka Poojarappa puts ideas into Poojarappa's head regarding Naagi. Heeding this, Poojarappa goes to Naagi's house and forces himself upon her, but Naagi pushes him away and he runs. Chenna and Leela who are coming to meet Naagi, see Poojarappa running away from Naagi's house. They ask Naagi to move into their house for safety.

After a while Naagi has become one of the member of Chenna's family and is happy. Leela goes her parents house for few days, and gets stuck due to her mother's illness. Meanwhile, Poojarappa works Honna and puts ideas about Naagi into him. Honna forces upon himself on Naagi and has his way with her. Chenna hearing the noises runs down and sees what happened and chases Honna away. Naagi runs away to her house and now has lost her voice. Chenna wants to get Honna back and get him married to Naagi, but the mother intervenes and says it won't sit well with the village and that it's a matter of status for the family. She also goes to Naagi and asks her not to tell anyone about what happened. Chenna is not happy but since Naagi does not say anything, he is helpless.

Leela comes back and finds everything is odd at home. Mother tells Leela this is all because of Naagi. Leela goes to Naagi and blames her for everything. She then goes to the temple, where she finds Honna hiding. When asked what happened, Poojarappa says that Chenna raped Naagi and that Honna saw everything and is too afraid to go home, to which Honna agrees. Leela cannot take this news and she leaves town and later it is found that she is dead.

Naagi gives birth to a child and the village wants to throw her out. At this point, Mother goes to Naagi's house and accepts the baby as her heir. Honna comes out and accepts his fault and that he will marry Naagi. This realization of Honna, Mother and others accepting this is termed as 'Punarjanma' by Chenna.

== Cast ==
- Rajkumar as Chenna
- Jayanthi as Leela
- Chandrakala As Naagi
- T. N. Balakrishna as Poojarappa
- Ranga as Honna
- Sathya as Chikka Poojarappa
- Jayashree as Mother
- Ganapathi Bhat
- Govindaraj
- Nanjappa
- B. R. Srinath
- Gopal Bhatta
- Veerappa
- Rama
- Renuka

== Soundtrack ==
The music was composed by Dulal Sen.

No.	Song	Singers	Lyrics	Length (m:ss)
1	"Muluga Bayasuve"	P. B. Sreenivas	R. N. Jayagopal	03:31
2	"Hubballiyinda Haribanda"	P. Susheela	R. N. Jayagopal	03:33
3	"Godholi Haruva"	P. Susheela, P. B. Sreenivas	R. N. Jayagopal	03:20
4	"Hakki Haado"	P. Susheela	R. N. Jayagopal	03:29
5	"Kannadathi Nammodathi"	P. Susheela, P. B. Sreenivas	R. N. Jayagopal	04:48
6	"Olumeya Hoove"	P. B. Sreenivas	R. N. Jayagopal	03:28
