= Gagana (film) =

- Directed by: Dorai–Bhagavan
- Written by: Chi. Udayashankar (dialogues)
- Based on: Gagana by Nuggehalli Pankaja
- Produced by: G. R. Krishnan
- Starring: Anant Nag; Khushbu; Mahalakshmi
- Cinematography: J. G. Krishna
- Edited by: Bhakthavatsala
- Music by: Rajan–Nagendra
- Production company: Ravikiran Combines
- Release date: 1989
- Country: India
- Language: Kannada

Gagana is a 1989 Indian Kannada-language directed by the duo of Dorai–Bhagavan, based on a novel of the same name by Nuggehalli Pankaja. It stars Anant Nag and Khushbu in the lead roles with Mahalakshmi in special appearance.

== Plot ==
Raju owns a textile business. On his subordinate Srikanth's request he hires Asha as his secretary to Raju. Asha is a chatterbox. Raju is irritated by her repeated messing up at the workplace.

Ash finds out from her mother's conversation that she was married in childhood. Asha confides in Raju's mother Annapoorna. When Annapoorna visits Asha's house to comfort her, she finds out that Asha is Gagana, Raju's child-bride. Annapoorna brings Asha home. Raju whoi is grieving the death of his wife Devayani does not remember the child marriage and refuses to accept Asha as his wife.

Asha makes repeated attempts to woo Raju but fails. Subbalakshmi arrives on the scene and wants to get her daughter Meena married to Raju. Asha continuously thwarts her attempts. Asha successfully foils an attempt on Raju's life by a rival business man by putting her own life in jeopardy. Raju eventually accepts Asha as his wife.

== Cast ==
- Anant Nag as Raju
- Srinath as Srikanth
- Khushbu as Asha
- Mahalakshmi as Devyani (Special Appearance)
- Vanitha Vasu as Meena
- Leelavathi as Annapoorna
- Thimmaiah as owner of textile company
- Sathyabhama as Subbalakshmi
- Ashok Badaradinni
- Shani Mahadevappa as Rangayya, a mechanic
- Y. R. Ashwath Narayana
- BEML Somanna
- Sundar Raj
- Archana (credited as Baby Archana) as Gagana
- K. S. Ashwath as Ananth (Guest Appearance)
- Rajanand as Shyam (Guest Appearance)

== Soundtrack ==
Track #	Song	Singer(s)
1	"Yenaithu Nanna Nalla"	K. S. Chitra
2	"Ellu Kaanenu Nanintha Hennanu"	S. P. Balasubrahmanyam, K. S. Chitra
3	"Baagilu Teredhu Kayya Hididhu"	K. S. Chitra
4	"Naanu Happy Neenu Happy"	S. P. Balasubrahmanyam, K. S. Chitra
