= En Thangai (1952 film) =

- Theatrical release poster
- Directed by: Ch. Narayana Murthy
- Screenplay by: Ch. Narayana Murthy
- Based on: En Thangai by T. S. Natarajan
- Produced by: C. Chenna Kesava Chettiyar
- Starring: M. G. Ramachandran; E. V. Saroja; P. S. Govindan; P. V. Narasimmabharathi; Madhuri Devi
- Cinematography: Jithen Banerji
- Edited by: Ch. Narayana Murthy
- Music by: C. N. Pandurangan
- Production company: Ashoka Pictures Salem
- Release date: 31 May 1952
- Running time: 170 minutes
- Country: India
- Language: Tamil

En Thangai (transl. My Younger Sister) is a 1952 Indian Tamil-language drama film directed by Ch. Narayana Murthy, starring M. G. Ramachandran and E. V. Saroja. The film is based on T. S. Natarajan's play of the same name. It was released on 31 May 1952. The film was remade in Hindi as Chhoti Bahen, in Telugu as Aada Paduchu and in Kannada as Onde Balliya Hoogalu.

== Plot ==
Rajendran, the breadwinner of his family, watches over his young brother, Selvam, a student, his younger sister Meena, and their very ill mother, Gunavathi. Karunagaran Pillai, their paternal uncle, robs them of their fortune after the disappearance of the patriarch, and refuses all requests for financial help by Rajendran. On the other hand, Suriyamoorthy, Karunagaran's son, discreetly devotes himself to his cousin, Rajendran, and his family. One evening, during a violent thunderstorm, young Meena loses her eyesight. She then becomes the scapegoat of Selvam's wealthy wife, Rajam, her sister-in-law, who also begins hating Meena. Rajendran, previously unaware of the situation, finally discovers his younger sister's ordeal. Following a heated quarrel, Selvam and Rajam leave the family home, leaving Rajendran totally distraught. Then sadly, their mother dies and, expelled by their uncle, Rajendran and Meena are forced out onto the street.

Their cousin, Suriyamoorthy, runs away from his father to the capital, where he becomes a rickshaw driver and offers temporary accommodation to Rajendran and Meena. Meanwhile, younger brother, Selvam, becomes addicted to horse racing just like his father-in-law, driving his family into financial ruin and neglecting Rajam. After Rajendran manages to reconcile the couple, Rajam dies in a road accident. Karunagaran comes in search of his son, and he too is knocked down by a vehicle. Dying, he gives his permission for Suriyamoorthy to marry Mary, a Christian. As for Rajendran, he is beaten and finally, pushed to his limits, carries his sister into the sea and they both disappear under the waves.

== Cast ==
Male cast

- M. G. Ramachandran as Rajendran
- P. S. Govindan as Suryamurthi
- P. V. Narasimmabharathi as Selvam
- M. G. Chakrapani as Karunagaram Pillai
- T. R. B. Rao as Veerasami Pillai
- C. S. Pandhiyan as Azhagan
- S. N. Narayanasami as Veeraiyan
- Kottapuli Jayaraman as Chitraguptan
- Master Krishnan as Idiot Boy
- N. Azhwar as Gundu Chetty

Female cast

- Madhuri Devi as Rajam
- V. Susheela as Mary
- S. R. Janaki as Gunavathi
- E. V. Saroja as Meena
- M. N. Rajam as Azhagi

== Production ==
The pre-production crew at Central Studios, Coimbatore, initially planned to merge the plays Parasakthi by Pavalar Balasundaram and En Thangai by T. S. Natarajan to make a film. However, Natarajan disagreed with the idea; En Thangai was ultimately made as a single film directed by Ch. Narayana Murthy. Thiruchi Loganathan was initially cast as the lead actor; however, after a few scenes were shot, he was removed as Narayana Murthy was not impressed. Unsuccessful attempts were earlier made to have Sivaji Ganesan, who portrayed the role on stage, do the same onscreen. The role ultimately went to M. G. Ramachandran.

== Soundtrack ==
The music was composed by C. N. Pandurangan.

Song	Singers	Lyrics	Length
"Aadum Oonjalai Pole"	T. A. Mothi & P. Leela	Suratha	03:33
"Azhagaai Bommai Vaitthu"	A. P. Komala	A. Maruthakasi	03:02
"Good Luck Good Luck"	C. S. Pandiyan & A. G. Rathnamala	A. Maruthakasi	02:30
"Meelaa Thuyaraamo...Kankal Irandum"	N. Lalitha	Narasimman	03:39
"Dheena Dhayaabari Thaaye"	M. L. Vasanthakumari	Saravanabhavananthar	03:34
"Kaadhal Vaazhvile Magizhndhom"	T. A. Mothi & P. Leela	Bharathidasan	03:11
"Vaazhvadhilum Nalam Soozhvadhilum"	P. S. Govindhan	Bharathidasan	02:56
"Inbame Siridhum Ariyaadha Pen Jenmam"	P. Leela	Saravanabhavananthar	03:12
"Naalukku Naal Paarkira Podhe"	N. Lalitha	A. Maruthakasi	03:01
"Varumai Puyalaale...Karuvile Uruvaana Gaayam"	A. M. Rajah	A. Maruthakasi	04:01
"En Inba Jothiye Un Anbu Paarvaiyaal"	P. S. Govindhan & K. V. Janaki	A. Maruthakasi	03:34
"Annaiye Annaiye Annaiye Arul Thaaarum Mary Thaaye"	A. P. Komala	Ki. Rajagopal	03:22

== Reception ==
The film was a success in box office. Film historian Randor Guy wrote in 2008 that the film will be "Remembered for its emotion drenched storyline and MGR’s role as a loving brother, considered by critics as one of his best performances ever." The film was remade in Telugu as Na Chellelu (1953) with the same team. It was remade by L. V. Prasad in Hindi as Chhoti Bahen (1959), and in Odia as Punar Milana.
