= Phanigiri =

Buddhist site in Telangana, India

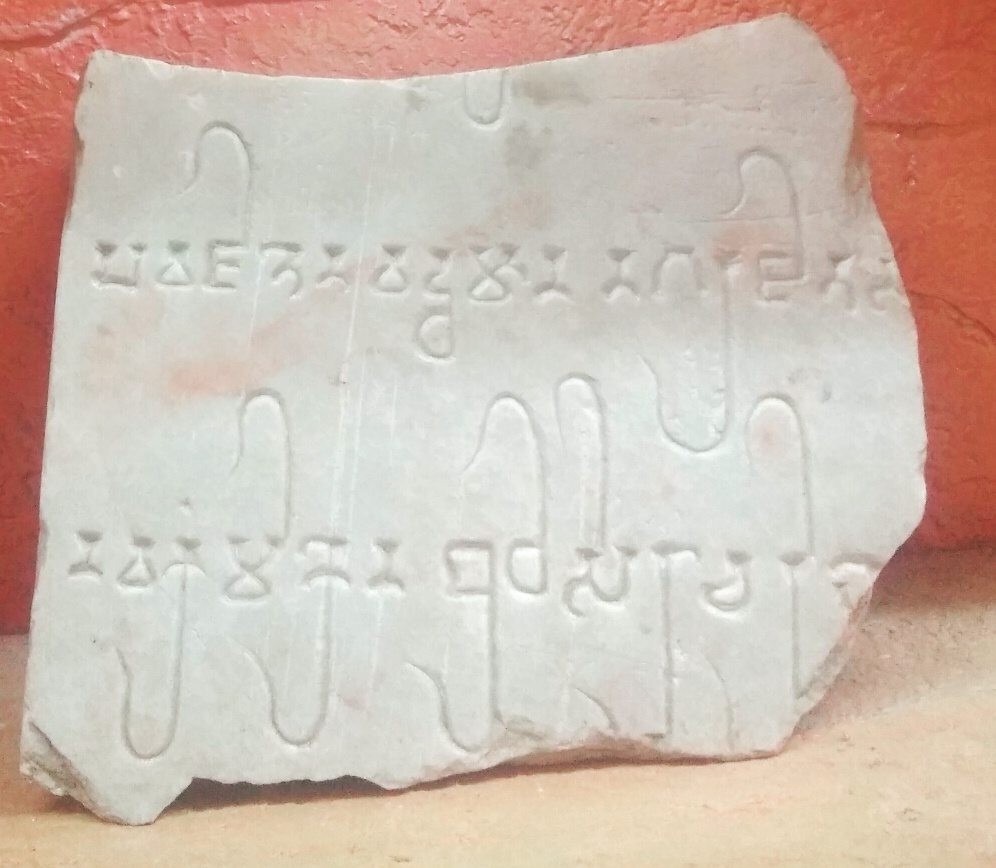
A Brahmi stone inscription from Phanigiri

Phanigiri is a Buddhist site in Suryapet district, Telangana. It dates to the 1st Century BCE - 4th century CE period.

The site is a major discovery in the history of the early India. It is closely related to the stupa complexes at Amaravati and Nagarjunakonda.

== Structure ==
Phanigiri is a village in Suryapet district, Telangana. It is situated about 40 km from Suryapet city. The place consists of a Buddhist complex which is adorned with a massive stupa along with two apsidal halls with stupas in it.

Two large footprints in the complex are believed to belong to Gautama Buddha. The place also houses three viharas which were once served as the dwelling for the Buddhist monks. Previously the name of the village is Dharmachakrapuram but later it is changed to Phanigir. The name is derived from two words which represent the shape of the hill (phani=snake, giri=hill).
