= Alaigal (film) =

1973 film by C. V. Sridhar

- Title card
- Directed by: Sridhar
- Written by: Sridhar
- Produced by: Sridhar
- Starring: Vishnuvardhan; Chandrakala
- Cinematography: U. Rajagopal
- Edited by: N. M. Shankar
- Music by: M. S. Viswanathan
- Production company: Chithralaya
- Release date: 1973
- Country: India
- Language: Tamil

Alaigal (transl. Waves) is a 1973 Indian Tamil-language film written, produced and directed by Sridhar. The film stars Vishnuvardhan and Chandrakala. It was the first Tamil film of Vishnuvardhan.

== Cast ==
- Vishnuvardhan as Inspector Raju
- Chandrakala as Lakshmi
- Cho
- Manorama as Nalina
- Selvakumar
- Thengai Srinivasan
- Suruli Rajan
- Rama Rao
- Typist Gopu
- Sundari Bai
- Kumudhini
- Seethalakshmi

== Production ==
After the average response to his previous film Avalukendru Or Manam (1971), Sridhar decided to make a Tamil-Telugu bilingual titled Thulasi (transl. Basil) with A. V. M. Rajan starring in Tamil and Sobhan Babu in Telugu. Sridhar developed a story from the Hindi film Aadmi (1939) and the American film Waterloo Bridge (1931), retaining only the basic premise. However, after canning 4,000 feet (1,200 m), he decided to drop the film, uncertain whether the audience would accept a film with anti-sentimental elements. Sridhar restarted the same film with changes in the script and cast. The title was changed to Alaigal, with Kannada actor Vishnuvardhan in the lead which marked his debut in Tamil cinema. The film also marked the acting debut of Selvakumar. A scene with Vishnuvardhan and Chandrakala was shot at Vasu Studios.

== Soundtrack ==
The music was composed by M. S. Viswanathan, while the lyrics were written by Kannadasan.

Track listing
No.	Title	Singer(s)	Length
1.	"Oomai Pennai"	S. Janaki
2.	"Ponnenna Poovenna"	P. Jayachandran
3.	"Pachai Ilai"	L. R. Eswari
4.	"Vaangaiya"	L. R. Eswari

== Reception ==
Kumudham called the story ordinary, criticising it for lack of originality. Kalki praised Sridhar for directing a film with a different kind of plot without including any cinematic elements. Navamani praised the dialogues, acting, cinematography and direction and concluded calling it a milestone in Sridhar's career. However the film failed at the box office.
