= Thatha-Manavadu =

- Theatrical release poster
- Directed by: Dasari Narayana Rao
- Written by: Dasari Narayana Rao
- Produced by: K. Raghava
- Starring: S. V. Ranga Rao; Raja Babu; Kaikala Satyanarayana; Anjali Devi; Vijaya Nirmala; Rajasulochana
- Cinematography: M. Kannappa
- Music by: Ramesh Naidu
- Release date: 23 March 1973
- Country: India
- Language: Telugu

Thatha-Manavadu (transl. Grandfather-Grandson) is a 1973 Indian Telugu-language film written and directed by Dasari Narayana Rao in his debut. The film stars S. V. Ranga Rao and Raja Babu in the titular roles. Thatha-Manavadu featured Raja Babu, who had mostly acted in comic and supporting roles until then, as a lead actor. He is paired with actress Vijaya Nirmala.

The film was released on 23 March 1973. It ran for 25 weeks in theatres. The film won the Nandi Award for Second Best Feature Film. It was later remade in Kannada as Maga Mommaga (1974) and in Hindi as Suntan (1976).

== Plot ==
Rangayya (S. V. Ranga Rao) lives with his wife Seetha (Anjali Devi) and his sister's daughter, Suguna (Chandrakala). He is a labourer who toils to fulfill the wish of making his son, Anand (Kaikala Satyanarayana), a doctor, by sending him to the city and hopes to marry Anand to his sister's daughter Suguna (Chandrakala), as promised to his dying sister, after Anand becomes a doctor. However, Anand leads a Casanova lifestyle, conning everyone in the city and his family back home, who as a result of not being privy to what is happening in the city, send him money regularly on demand. This fools even creditors in the city who give him huge loans, using which Anand leads a life of excess. He does this to show that he is from a rich Zamindar's family, to conceal his origin, in order to woo Geetha (Rajasulochana), a rich girl who leads a Page 3 life and detests lower-class people. He intends to use her to pay off his loans and enjoy the rest of her wealth after marrying her. When the debts mount, he resorts to continuous postponement of marriage with Geetha, for fear of being exposed, and runs back home to get money for temporary payment of loans to ensure his plan of marrying Geetha is not jeopardized. When he reaches the village, Anand promises to marry Suguna, makes her pregnant and cheats her into giving her jewellery and runs away for good.

Eventually, this is revealed to Rangayya and Seetha, who in order to save Suguna's honour decide to marry her to Anand as soon as possible. Rangayya sets off to the city to bring back Anand only to find out Anand has married Geeta. Rangayya angrily confronts Anand, but latter claims he doesn't know who Rangayya is and Rangayya is thrown out. Geetha however, confronts Anand on his successful ploy, but decides against taking action, believing it would bring shame to her if this matter became public. Rangayya reaches home a broken man and reveals what happened to his family. Shattered, they decide to leave the city to escape humiliation in the village. Rangayya now toils even harder for the sake of his family. Soon, Suguna gives birth to a daughter, Laxmi, and dies while Geeta gives birth to a son, Giri. Time flies by with Rangayya and Seetha taking solace from despair by tending to Laxmi.

Eventually, circumstances cause Rangayya to work as a labourer, in Anand's mansion construction, and when this fact reaches his knowledge, he suffers an accident at the construction site making him blind. This means that Seetha now has to work as housemaid for the upkeep of the family and circumstances cause even her to reach Anand's home as a housemaid. Soon, Seetha and Anand meet face to face, in shock, Seetha explains to her son what has transpired and remorseless, Anand blames it on fate and refuses to come to her mother's rescue. Seetha, for Rangayya and Laxmi's sake, decides to keep the matter secret and continues to work in the home. She suffers constant humiliation daily, at the hands of Anand and his family, with Giri albeit young the only one shielding Seetha, which does not bode well with Geeta and the rest of the family. Giri ends up meeting Laxmi at school, which leads him to meet Rangayya. He treats him like his own father, but Seetha refuses to reveal any secret, but is forever indebted and proud of her own grandson.

Years later, Giri (now Raja Babu) has become a medical student and falls in love with his college mate Raani (Vijay Nirmala), who is the daughter of Paramatma Rao (Gummadi), Advocate and Solicitor to Geetha's family. Meanwhile, Laxmi also has grown up to become a nurse. Giri, as an adult with the capacity of independence, has grown to love Rangayya's family even more while defending them and helping them at every step. One day, an elderly and tired Seetha, while serving coffee to guests visiting home, faints, spilling coffee on Geetha. She pushes Seetha out of disgust and this injures Seetha. Giri on learning of the incident tends to Seetha. He goes to bring Rangayya to her care. Meanwhile, Geeta makes her family including Anand throw Seetha into the garage. Giri comes back with Rangayya to notice this, yet prevents telling blind Rangayya what transpired, to prevent him from being shattered on the turn of events. He rebels against his family, tends to both and makes them comfortable and leaves for a medical camp. Seeing the opportunity, Rangayya and Seetha leave for their home, where Seetha's condition deteriorates. Giri reaches Rangayya's home with Raani and her brother Kutumba Rao, as on return to his home after camp, he noticed Rangayya and Seetha had left. He brings a specialist doctor who diagnoses Seetha with internal haemorrhage, stating, she will not live long. Circumstances make Seetha reveal to everything to everyone and dies. Giri performs his grandmother's last rites. Completely void of all hope to live life, Ramaiah wanders away from the rites ceremony and meets with an accident and is revealed to have died. Giri reveals everything now to an inconsolable Laxmi and they all gather at Raani's house and decide to teach Anand's family a lesson as a revenge as per Paramata Rao's instruction. The plan is to make them suffer exactly the way Ramaiah and Seetha suffered. The life of excess led by Anand's family was fed by loans from mortgaging property which Geetha's grandfather had willed to Giri when he would be born, but now since Giri was a major he gained Power of Attorney, so, they decide to grab it from him by deceit. He foils their plan, so they plan to marry him to the creditor's daughter itself, which would wipe out the loans for which Giri pretends to marry Raani who now poses as a villager, which infuriates Geetha who detests such people. At wit's end, they try to forge the Power of Attorney papers, for which they go to Paramatma Rao. He pretends to oblige, but later publicizes everything and when confronted by Anand's family, he lies by saying he was threatened by Giri at gunpoint. He then disguises himself as Raani's village father and all of them start to blackmail Anand's family to the brink of breakdown, which makes them realise all their sins. The creditor comes to arrest Anand and Geetha for non-payment of loans, for which they oblige, but they are led as per plan to Paramatma's home. There, a man repays the creditor the loan amount preventing Anand and Geetha's arrest. They wish to know who is the man who saved them, it is revealed to be Rangayya along with the rest. Rangayya survived an apparent accident and was operated upon to get back his vision and cared for in Paramatma Rao's house. He reveals the whole sequence of events to his Anand and Geeta, who were ashamed and apologized for their actions and thus the forgery case was also rested. Rangayya, refused to forgive them, but was ready to forget. He praises his grandson and Rao's family by claiming how they gave him a new lease of life. Paramatma Rao announces the wedding of Raani with Giri and Laxmi with Kutumba Rao. The movie ends on a happy note with the family opening a free hospital named in memory of Seetha as Rangayya wished.

== Cast ==
Actor	Character
S. V. Ranga Rao	Rangayya
Anjali Devi	Seeta, wife of Rangayya
Raja Babu	Giri, son of Anand
Kaikala Satyanarayana	Anand, son of Rangayya
Rajasulochana	Geeta, wife of Anand
Vijaya Nirmala	Raani
Allu Ramalingaiah	
Ramaprabha	
Chhaya Devi	
Chandrakala	Suguna
Gummadi	Paramatma Rao
Rao Gopal Rao	Kutumba Rao
Kommineni Seshagiri Rao	
Srividya	Dancer
Potti Veerayya	

== Songs ==
Track list
No.	Title	Lyrics	Singer(s)	Length
1.	"Anubandham Athmeeyatha"	C. Narayana Reddy	V. Ramakrishna
2.	"Eenade Babu Nee Puttinaroju"	C. Narayana Reddy	P. Susheela
3.	"Nookalammanu Nenu"		S. P. Balasubrahmanyam, L. R. Eswari
4.	"Raayanti Naa Mogudu"		L. R. Eswari
5.	"Soma Mangala Budha"		S. P. Balasubrahmanyam, L. R. Eswari
6.	"Yemito Ee Lokamanta"		V. Ramakrishna

== Awards ==
- The film won the Nandi Award for Second Best Feature Film – Silver (producers K. Raghava and Ekambara Rao)
