= Chhoti Bahen =

1959 film

- Theatrical poster
- Directed by: L. V. Prasad
- Screenplay by: Inder Raj Anand
- Based on: En Thangai (Tamil)(1952)
- Produced by: L. V. Prasad
- Starring: Balraj Sahni; Nanda; Rehman
- Cinematography: Dwarka Divecha
- Edited by: Shivaji Awdhut
- Music by: Shankar-Jaikishan
- Distributed by: Prasad Productions Pvt. Ltd.
- Release date: 6 February 1959
- Running time: 160 minutes
- Country: India
- Language: Hindi

Chhoti Bahen (transl. Younger sister) is a 1959 Indian Hindi-language film that stars Nanda in the title role, Balraj Sahni and Rehman. It is a remake of the 1952 Tamil film En Thangai.

== Plot ==
Rajendra lives a poor lifestyle along with his younger collegian brother Shekhar, as well a younger sister Meena. He is in love with a school-teacher, and both hope to get married after Meena and Shekhar's marriages. Luck shines upon them and Meena's marriage is arranged with Dr. Ramesh, while Shekhar decides to wed Shobha, the only daughter of a wealthy man obsessed with horse-racing. Rajendra mortgages his house with his paternal uncle. Then things turn sour after Meena loses her vision; the wedding gets canceled, and Rajendra is humiliated by Ramesh's dad. Rajendra decides to remain single to look after Meena, and permits Shekhar and Shobha to get married. The marriage takes place, and Shobha moves in. Shortly thereafter misunderstandings crop up, and lead to arguments, with Shekhar and Shobha moving out to live with Shobha's dad. Then Rajendra is fired from his job, his paternal uncle takes over the house, and asks him to leave. Homeless, they turn to Shekhar for help, but he refuses to assist them in any way. Then Rajendra falls ill and gets separated from his sister, while Shekhar takes to horse-racing and alcohol, and a path that will only lead to self-destruction. When Shekhar leaves his house, he finds meena met with an accident with a truck and then takes her to the hospital. In hospital, he reunites with his family after begging for forgiveness for his ill-deeds. Dr. Ramesh arrives and offers to marry Meena. Meena in turn ask Rajendra to marry Yashoda. The movie ends on a happy note on the Airport where Meena is leaving to go to outside India for her eye treatment with her husband .

== Cast ==
- Balraj Sahni as Rajendra
- Nanda as Meena
- Dhumal as Sukhiya
- Mehmood as Mahesh
- Shubha Khote as Sheela
- Shyama as Shobha
- Rehman as Shekhar
- Kanchanamala as Chanchal
- Hari Shivdasani as Ramesh's father
- Badri Prasad as Shobha's father
- Kunwar Keshav as Doctor
- Radhakrishan as Mahesh's father
- Sudesh Kumar as Dr. Ramesh
- Veena (actress) as Yashoda

== Soundtrack ==
Chhoti Bahen

Soundtrack album by Shankar-Jaikishan
- Released: 31 December 1959
- Genre: Feature film soundtrack
- Label: EMI

Music composed by Shankar-Jaikishan and lyrics by Shailendra and Hasrat Jaipuri.

Track list
Track	Song	Singer(s)	Lyric
1	Jaoon Kahan Bata Ae Dil	Mukesh	Hasrat Jaipuri
2	Main Rangeela Pyar Ka Rahi	Lata Mangeshkar & Subir Sen	Hasrat Jaipuri
3	Kali Anar Ki Na Itna Satao	Asha Bhosle & Manna Dey	Hasrat Jaipuri
4	Main Rickshwala	Mohd. Rafi	Shailendra
5	Yeh Kaisa Nyay Tera	Lata Mangeshkar	Shailendra
6	Bagon Mein Baharon Mein	Lata Mangeshkar	Shailendra
7	Badi Door Se Aai Hoon Main	Lata Mangeshkar	Shailendra
8	Bhaiya Mere Rakhi Ke Bandhan Ko	Lata Mangeshkar	Shailendra

The song "Jaoon Kahan Bata Ae Dil" is set in raga Jhinjhoti.

== Awards and nominations ==
- Nomination Filmfare Award for Best Film
- Nomination Filmfare Award for Best Director – Prasad
- Nomination Filmfare Award for Best Supporting Actor – Mehmood as Mahesh
- Nomination Filmfare Award for Best Music Director – Shankar-Jaikishan
- Nomination Filmfare Award for Best Playback Singer – Lata Mangeshkar for the song "Bhaiya Mere Rakhi Ke Bandhan Ko"
