= H. M. Reddy =

Indian film director, producer (1892–1960)

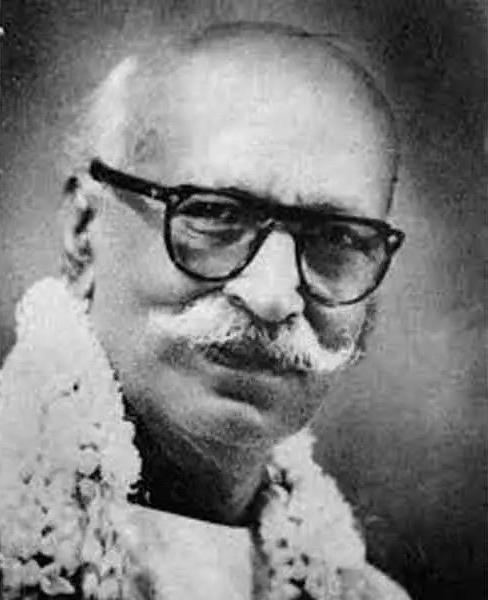
- Born: Hanumappa Muniappa Reddy; 12 June 1892; British India
- Died: 14 January 1960 (aged 67)
- Occupations: Film director; film producer

Hanumappa Muniappa Reddy (12 June 1892 – 14 January 1960), known as H. M. Reddy, was an Indian film director and producer, known for his works in Telugu cinema. He directed the first Indian multilingual sound film Kalidas (1931), shot in Telugu and Tamil. He then produced and directed the first full length Telugu sound film, Bhakta Prahlada in 1932.

== Early career ==
H. M. Reddy was born in a Telugu family on 12 June 1892. He studied in Bangalore where he worked as a police inspector. Later he left the job as he was not interested to work for the British. With an interest in the field of cinema, he moved to Mumbai to research on Telugu movies where he also worked as reflector boy in a studio.

Reddy had started Rohini Pictures Limited at Madras with the partnership of B. N. Reddy and actress Kannamba. Reddy produced and directed India's first multilingual (Telugu-Tamil) talkie, Kalidasa in 1931. He then produced and directed the first full length Telugu sound film, Bhakta Prahlada in 1932. The first film released from this banner was Gruha Lakshmi that was based on the play of "Rangoon Rowdy".

H. M. Reddy died on 14 Jan 1960, during the making of Gaja Donga.

== Producer ==
1. Bhakta Prahlada (1932)
2. Gruhalakshmi (1938)
3. Tenali Ramakrishna (1941)
4. Pratigna (1953)
5. Vaddante Dabbu (1954) (presenter)

== Director ==
1. Prince Vijay Kumar (1930)
2. Kalidas (1931)
3. Bar Ke Pobar (1931)
4. Bhakta Prahlada (1932)
5. Sati Savitri (1933)
6. Jazz of Life (1932)
7. Sita Swayamvar (1933)
8. Gruhalakshmi (1938)
9. Mathru Bhoomi (1939)
10. Chaduvukunna Bharya (1940)
11. Bondam Pelli (1940)
12. Barrister Parvateesam (1940)
13. Tenali Ramakrishna (1941)
14. Gharana Donga (1942)
15. Sati Seeta (1946)
16. Nirdoshi (1951)
17. Niraparadhi (1951)
18. Pratigna (1953)

== See also ==
- Raghupathi Venkaiah Naidu
