= List of Kannada songs recorded by S. Janaki =

Sistla Janaki, commonly known as S. Janaki, was an Indian singer who has sung over 10,000 songs in various Indian languages. The following is a list of Kannada songs recorded by her:

== Before 1970s ==
=== 1950s–1960s ===
Year	Film	Song	Music director	Writer	Co-singer	Note(s)
1957	Rayara Sose	Thaalalenthu Shoka Vega	R. Diwakara	P. Gundu Rao		
1958	Shree Krishna Gaarudi	Bhale Bhale Gaarudi	Pendyala Nageshwara Rao	Hunsur Krishnamurthy	Pendyala Nageshwara Rao	
1959	Abba Aa Hudugi	Hrudaya Deviye	P. Kalinga Rao	H L N Simha	P. B. Sreenivas	
1959	Abba Aa Hudugi	Aaseya Gopura	P. Kalinga Rao	H L N Simha	P. B. Sreenivas	
1959	Abba Aa Hudugi	Aanandadaayakavu		H L N Simha		
1959	Mahishasura Mardini	Gaganadali Mugilaneri	G. K. Venkatesh	Chi. Sadashivaiah		
1959	Mahishasura Mardini	Thumbithu Manava	G. K. Venkatesh	Chi. Sadashivaiah	Rajkumar	
1960	Aasha Sundari	Oh Sakhi	S. Dakshinamurthi	Hunsur Krishnamurthy	S. Varalakshmi	
1960	Aasha Sundari	Guttenide Gatti Mathu	S. Dakshinamurthi	Hunsur Krishnamurthy		
1960	Aasha Sundari	Amruthamaya Ee Sneha	S. Dakshinamurthi	Hunsur Krishnamurthy	P. Susheela	
1960	Dashavathara	Onde Balliya Hoovu	G. K. Venkatesh	G. V. Iyer	A. P. Komala	
1960	Dashavathara	Baare Radhike Kopa Ethake	G. K. Venkatesh	G. V. Iyer	L. R. Eswari	
1960	Dashavathara	Raghupathi Raghava	G. K. Venkatesh	G. V. Iyer		
1960	Dashavathara	Nandana Nandana	G. K. Venkatesh	G. V. Iyer		
1960	Bhakta Kanakadasa	Balli Balli	M. Venkataraju	Hunsur Krishnamurthy		
1960	Bhakta Kanakadasa	Chinnadante Chinna	M. Venkataraju	Hunsur Krishnamurthy		
1960	Bhakta Kanakadasa	Shringaara Sheela	M. Venkataraju	Hunsur Krishnamurthy	P. B. Sreenivas	
1960	Makkala Rajya	Jaya Jaya Gokula Baala	T. G. Lingappa	Kanagal Prabhakar Shastry	A. P. Komala	
1960	Makkala Rajya	Nagalu Barado	T. G. Lingappa	Kanagal Prabhakar Shastry		
1960	Rani Honnamma	Srikrishnanekinta	Vijaya Bhaskar	K. R. Seetharama Sastry	P. B. Sreenivas	
1960	Rani Honnamma	Jeevan Hoovina	Vijaya Bhaskar	K. R. Seetharama Sastry	P. B. Sreenivas	
1960	Rani Honnamma	Kolu Gejje Kaalu Gejje	Vijaya Bhaskar	K. R. Seetharama Sastry		
1960	Ranadheera Kanteerava	Sanchari Manasothe	G. K. Venkatesh	G. V. Iyer		
1961	Kantheredu Nodu	Hennina Mele	G. K. Venkatesh	G. V. Iyer	P. B. Sreenivas	
1961	Kantheredu Nodu	Yedavidare Naa	G. K. Venkatesh	G. V. Iyer	L. R. Eswari	
1961	Kaiwara Mahathme	Nidiraa Devi	G. K. Venkatesh	G. V. Iyer		
1961	Kittur Chennamma	Hoovina Hantha Hatthuva Jane	T. G. Lingappa	G. V. Iyer	Kamala	
1961	Kittur Chennamma	Aalakke Hoovilla	T. G. Lingappa	G. V. Iyer	A. P. Komala	
1961	Kittur Chennamma	Sanne Eneno Maadithu Kannu	T. G. Lingappa	G. V. Iyer	P. B. Sreenivas	
1961	Kittur Chennamma	Kolu Thudiya Kodagananthe	T. G. Lingappa	Akka Mahadevi		
1961	Nagarjuna	Ananda Thanda Chandira	Rajan Nagendra	Hunsur Krishnamurthy	P. B. Sreenivas	
1962	Bhoodana	Paatashaale Illade	G. K. Venkatesh	G. V. Iyer	P. B. Sreenivas	
1962	Karuneye Kutumbada Kannu	Ashagana Mohana	G. K. Venkatesh	Kanagal Prabhakara Shastry		
1962	Karuneye Kutumbada Kannu	Baramma Guruseve	G. K. Venkatesh	Kanagal Prabhakara Shastry		
1962	Karuneye Kutumbada Kannu	Jan Jan Kalgejje	G. K. Venkatesh	Kanagal Prabhakara Shastry		
1962	Karuneye Kutumbada Kannu	Nagareekane Ninna	G. K. Venkatesh	Kanagal Prabhakara Shastry		
1962	Karuneye Kutumbada Kannu	Nijavo Sullo	G. K. Venkatesh	Kanagal Prabhakara Shastry	P. B. Sreenivas	
1962	Karuneye Kutumbada Kannu	Premagana Thanda	G. K. Venkatesh	Kanagal Prabhakara Shastry		
1962	Rathna Manjari	Neerahotha Neere Jaane	T. G. Lingappa	G. V. Iyer	P. B. Sreenivas	
1962	Rathna Manjari	Gili Gili Gilakku	T. G. Lingappa	G. V. Iyer		
1962	Sri Dharmasthala Mahathme	Chandranatha Paramapootha	M. Venkataraju	G. V. Iyer		
1962	Sri Dharmasthala Mahathme	Gathikaane Hey Dayamaya	M. Venkataraju	G. V. Iyer		
1962	Swarna Gowri	Baara Chandramaa	M. Venkataraju	S. K. Karim Khan	P. B. Sreenivas	
1962	Swarna Gowri	Haadelenu Manadaase	M. Venkataraju	S. K. Karim Khan		
1962	Swarna Gowri	Ee Leela Vilaasa	M. Venkataraju	S. K. Karim Khan		
1962	Swarna Gowri	Nyayavidenamma	M. Venkataraju	S. K. Karim Khan		
1962	Swarna Gowri	Jaya Gowri Jagadeeshwari	M. Venkataraju	S. K. Karim Khan	Chittaranjan	
1962	Swarna Gowri	Banthu Nava Youvvana	M. Venkataraju	S. K. Karim Khan		
1962	Swarna Gowri	O Janani Kalyani	M. Venkataraju	S. K. Karim Khan		
1962	Thejaswini	Rasaghalige Baaradu	M. Venkataraju	K. R. Seetharama Sastry		
1962	Vidhi Vilasa	Daari Kaanene Nova Thaalalaarene	T. Padman	Narayana Rao	P. B. Sreenivas	
1962	Vidhi Vilasa	Aananda Saamrajyada	T. Padman	Narayana Rao	P. B. Sreenivas	
1962	Vidhi Vilasa	Maathaa Hay Girijaatha	T. Padman	Narayana Rao		
1963	Chandra Kumaara	Neene Neere Mandaara	M. Venkataraju; T. Chalapathi Rao	S. K. Karim Khan	P. B. Sreenivas	
1963	Chandra Kumaara	Bannadinda Bangaradanda	M. Venkataraju; T. Chalapathi Rao	S. K. Karim Khan		
1963	Chandra Kumaara	Gejje Jhan Jhan	M. Venkataraju; T. Chalapathi Rao	S. K. Karim Khan		
1963	Gowri	"Putta Putta Hejje" (duet)	G. K. Venkatesh	Kuvempu	P. B. Sreenivas	
1963	Gowri	"Ivalu Yaaru Balle Yenu"	G. K. Venkatesh	K S Narasimha Swamy	P. B. Sreenivas	
1963	Gowri	"Naa Bedavende"	G. K. Venkatesh	K. R. Seetharama Sastry	solo	
1963	Gowri	"Putta Putta Hejje" (female)	G. K. Venkatesh	Kuvempu	solo	
1963	Gowri	"Yaava Janmada Maitri"	G. K. Venkatesh	Kuvempu	solo	
1963	Jeevana Tharanga	"Baara Mandaara"	M. Venkataraju	S. K. Karim Khan		
1963	Jeevana Tharanga	"Banthamma Madhuve"	M. Venkataraju	S. K. Karim Khan		
1963	Jeevana Tharanga	"Hennagi Bandamele"	M. Venkataraju	S. K. Karim Khan		
1963	Jeevana Tharanga	"Manade Munide"	M. Venkataraju	S. K. Karim Khan	P. B. Sreenivas	
1963	Jeevana Tharanga	"Aananda Thumbi Thande"	M. Venkataraju	S. K. Karim Khan	P. B. Sreenivas	
1963	Jenu Goodu	Hesarige Ranga Vichaarise	Vijaya Krishnamurthy	K. R. Seetharama Sastry		
1963	Kanyarathna	Suvvi Suvvi Suvvale	G. K. Venkatesh	K. Prabhakar Sastry	P. B. Sreenivas	
1963	Kanyarathna	Elliharo Nalla	G. K. Venkatesh	Chi. Sadashivaiah	P. B. Sreenivas	
1963	Kanyarathna	Manava Kadda	G. K. Venkatesh	Chi. Sadashivaiah		
1963	Kanyarathna	Onde Maathu Onde Manasu	G. K. Venkatesh	Vijaya Narasimha		
1963	Kulavadhu	Emma Maneyangaladi	G. K. Venkatesh	Seetharamayya		
1963	Kulavadhu	Thaye Bara Mogava	G. K. Venkatesh	M. Govinda Pai		
1963	Kulavadhu	Hennina Mele	G. K. Venkatesh	G. V. Iyer	P. B. Sreenivas	
1963	Kulavadhu	Yedavidare Naa	G. K. Venkatesh	G. V. Iyer		
1963	Kulavadhu	Yuga Ugaadi Kaledaroa	G. K. Venkatesh	D. R. Bendre		
1963	Lava Kusa	Virise Chandira Vanthire	Ghantasala			
1963	Malli Maduve	Mahaapurushare Preraka Shakti	G. K. Venkatesh	K. R. Seetharama Sastry		
1963	Malli Maduve	Mangana Moreya Mudi Moosangi	G. K. Venkatesh	K. R. Seetharama Sastry		
1963	Malli Maduve	Nanna Ninna Sallapavella	G. K. Venkatesh	K. R. Seetharama Sastry		
1963	Mana Mecchida Madadi	Sirithana Beke	Vijaya Bhaskar	K. R. Seetharama Sastry		
1963	Nanda Deepa	Naadinanda Ee Deepavali	M. Venkataraju	Sorat Ashwath	P. Leela	
1963	Nanda Deepa	Gaaligopura Ninnashatheera	M. Venkataraju	Sorat Ashwath		
1963	Nanda Deepa	Naliva Mana	M. Venkataraju	Sorat Ashwath	P. B. Sreenivas	
1963	Nanda Deepa	Kanasonda Kande	M. Venkataraju	Sorat Ashwath		
1963	Saaku Magalu	Onde Ondu Hosa Haadu	T. G. Lingappa	Kanagal Prabhakara Shastry	P. B. Sreenivas	
1963	Saaku Magalu	Jeevana Raga	T. G. Lingappa	Kanagal Prabhakara Shastry	Ghantasala	
1963	Santha Thukaram	Beda Krishna	Vijaya Bhaskar	Chi. Sadashivaiah		
1963	Santha Thukaram	Mareyade Sooryanu	Vijaya Bhaskar	Chi. Sadashivaiah	P. B. Sreenivas	
1963	Sathi Shakthi	Chandramaama	T. G. Lingappa	Kanagal Prabhakara Shastry		
1963	Sathi Shakthi	Ee Vilaasi	T. G. Lingappa	Kanagal Prabhakara Shastry	P. B. Sreenivas	
1963	Sri Ramanjaneya Yuddha	Jhana Jhana Jhanjhana	Satyam	Geethapriya	Bangalore Latha	
1963	Sri Ramanjaneya Yuddha	Jaya Jaya Rama	Satyam	Geethapriya	B. Vasantha	
1963	Sri Ramanjaneya Yuddha	Belaguvare Anyayavane	Satyam	Geethapriya		
1963	Valmiki	Manade Maha Bayake	Ghantasala	Kanagal Prabhakar Sastry	P. Leela	
1964	Annapoorna	Krishna Bidu Bidu Kopava	Rajan–Nagendra	Chi. Udaya Shankar		
1964	Chandavalliya Thota	Balli Hange	T. G. Lingappa	R. N. Jayagopal	P. B. Sreenivas	
1964	Chandavalliya Thota	Namma Maneye Nandana	T. G. Lingappa	Ta Ra Su		
1964	Chinnada Gombe	Nodalli Meravangie	T. G. Lingappa	Vijaya Narasimha		
1964	Kalaavati	Gaana Naatya Rasaradhe	G. K. Venkatesh		T. A. Mothi	
1964	Madhu Malathi	Ee Bhava Ee Bhangi	G. K. Venkatesh		Bangalore Latha	
1964	Naandi	Chandramukhi Pranasakhi	Vijaya Bhaskar	R. N. Jayagopal	Bangalore Latha	
1964	Naandi	Udugoreyonda Thanda	Vijaya Bhaskar	R. N. Jayagopal		
1964	Naandi	Sathyakke Endigu Jayavemba	Vijaya Bhaskar	R. N. Jayagopal	P. B. Sreenivas	
1964	Navajeevana	Ide Ide Savi Baladina	Rajan–Nagendra	Sorat Aswath	P. B. Sreenivas	
1964	Navajeevana	Kareye Kogile	Rajan–Nagendra	Sorat Aswath		
1964	Navakoti Narayana	Ranga Bara	Shivaprasad		M. Balamuralikrishna	
1964	Post Master	Indenu Hunnimeyo	Vijaya Bhaskar	G. V. Iyer	P. B. Sreenivas	
1964	Post Master	Naaneshto Sala	Vijaya Bhaskar	G. V. Iyer		
1964	Thumbida Koda	Balle Balle Na Balle	G. K. Venkatesh			
1964	Thumbida Koda	Madhumaga Banda	G. K. Venkatesh			
1965	Bettada Huli	Attheya Magale	T. G. Lingappa	Geethapriya	L. R. Eswari & Rudrappa	
1965	Bettada Huli	Aakashada Lokadi Doora	T. G. Lingappa	Geethapriya	P. B. Sreenivas	
1965	Bettada Huli	Madumagalu Naanagi	T. G. Lingappa	Geethapriya		
1965	Bettada Huli	Eko Ee Dina	T. G. Lingappa	Geethapriya		
1965	Chandrahasa	"Kaviya Madhura Kalpane"	S. Hanumantha Rao	N/A	P. B. Sreenivas	
1965	Mavana Magalu	Naane Veene Neene Thanthi	T. Chalapathi Rao	Kuvempu	P. B. Sreenivas	
1965	Miss Leelavathi	"Doni Saagali"	R. Sudarsanam	Kuvempu	Ramachandra	
1965	Miss Leelavathi	"Nodu Baa Nodu Baa"	R. Sudarsanam	Vijaya Narasimha		
1965	Miss Leelavathi	"Bayake Balli"	R. Sudarsanam	Vijaya Narasimha	P. B. Sreenivas	
1965	Miss Leelavathi	"Neerinalli Neenu"	R. Sudarsanam	Vijaya Narasimha	P. B. Sreenivas	
1965	Nanna Kartavya	Nannalli Neenagi	G. K. Venkatesh	Nanju Kavi	P. B. Sreenivas	
1965	Pathala Mohini	Hagalu Irulu	Rajan–Nagendra	Hunsur Krishnamurthy		
1965	Pathala Mohini	Chilipiliguttuva Hakkiya	Rajan–Nagendra	Hunsur Krishnamurthy		
1965	Pathala Mohini	Oh Mavana Magale	Rajan–Nagendra	Hunsur Krishnamurthy	P. B. Sreenivas	
1965	Pathala Mohini	Enidu Yaaridu	Rajan–Nagendra	Hunsur Krishnamurthy	P. B. Sreenivas	
1965	Pathala Mohini	Anandasaara Prabhu	Rajan–Nagendra	Hunsur Krishnamurthy		
1966	Badukuva Daari	Illoo Iruve	T. Chalapathi Rao	Hunsur Krishnamurthy		
1966	Dudde Doddappa	Mathi Beku	T. G. Lingappa	Vijaya Narasimha		
1966	Dudde Doddappa	Yoeanada Hosa Hadu	T. G. Lingappa	R. N. Jayagopal	T. A. Mothi	
1966	Emme Thammanna	Belli Hakki Aguva	T. G. Lingappa	G. V. Iyer	P. B. Sreenivas	
1966	Emme Thammanna	Kanneradu Kareyuthide	T. G. Lingappa	G. V. Iyer	P. B. Sreenivas & Bangalore Latha	
1966	Emme Thammanna	Emme Ella Ellanna	T. G. Lingappa	G. V. Iyer		
1966	Emme Thammanna	Ninnayalla Thammanna	T. G. Lingappa	G. V. Iyer		
1966	Katari Veera	Haayaada Ee Sangama	Upendra Kumar	Sorat Ashwath	P. B. Sreenivas	
1966	Kiladi Ranga	Yaarige Mudi	G. K. Venkatesh	G. V. Iyer		
1966	Mantralaya Mahatme	Abharanada Alankaravenu Illade	Rajan–Nagendra	G. V. Iyer	L. R. Eswari	
1966	Mantralaya Mahatme	Rasika Saalade Rasada Authana	Rajan–Nagendra	G. V. Iyer		
1966	Premamayi	Henne Ninna Kannanota	R. Sudarsanam	Vijaya Narasimha	K. J. Yesudas	
1966	Premamayi	Krishna Aa Krishneyu	R. Sudarsanam	Vijaya Narasimha		
1966	Premamayi	Thengella Thoogadi	R. Sudarsanam	Narendra Babu	T. M. Soundararajan	
1966	Sandhya Raga	Nambide Ninna Nada Devathe	G. K. Venkatesh	G. V. Iyer		
1967	Bangarada Hoovu	Maduve Maduve	Rajan–Nagendra		P. Susheela	
1967	Bangarada Hoovu	Odhi Odhi	Rajan–Nagendra			
1967	Bangarada Hoovu	Nee Nadeva Haadiyalli	Rajan–Nagendra		P. Susheela	
1967	Beedi Basavanna	Angaile Aagasa Thoro	T. G. Lingappa	Chi. Udaya Shankar	Madhavapeddi Satyam	
1967	Belli Moda	Moodala Maneya Muttina Neerina	Vijaya Bhaskar	D. R. Bendre		
1967	Chakra Theertha	Eko Ee Pulaka	T. G. Lingappa	R. N. Jayagopal	P. B. Sreenivas	
1967	Chakra Theertha	Ninninda Neenendoo Hagalirulu	T. G. Lingappa	R. N. Jayagopal	P. B. Sreenivas	
1967	Gange Gowri	Cheluvaralli Cheluva	T. G. Lingappa	G. V. Iyer	Bangalore Latha	
1967	Gange Gowri	Thunga Badra Kaveri Ganga	T. G. Lingappa	G. V. Iyer		
1967	Gange Gowri	Neerahotha Neere Jaane	T. G. Lingappa	G. V. Iyer	P. B. Sreenivas	
1967	Immadi Pulikeshi	Kannadada Kula Thilaka	G. K. Venkatesh	G. V. Iyer	P. B. Sreenivas	
1967	Immadi Pulikeshi	Cheluvina Odethana	G. K. Venkatesh	G. V. Iyer		
1967	Immadi Pulikeshi	Thaaniralu Mane Keli	G. K. Venkatesh	G. V. Iyer		
1967	Immadi Pulikeshi	Atthige Naale	G. K. Venkatesh	G. V. Iyer		
1967	Lagna Pathrike	Aashagana Mohana	Vijaya Bhaskar	K. Prabhakara Shastry		
1967	Lagna Pathrike	Jan Jan Kalgejje	Vijaya Bhaskar			
1967	Lagna Pathrike	Nagareekane Ninna	Vijaya Bhaskar			
1967	Lagna Pathrike	Nijavo Sullo	Vijaya Bhaskar	K. Prabhakara Shastry	P. B. Sreenivas	
1967	Lagna Pathrike	Premagana Thanda	Vijaya Bhaskar			
1967	Muddu Meena	Bengaloora Dundumalli	Upendra Kumar	Sorat Ashwath		
1967	Onde Balliya Hoogalu	Anna Ninna Sodariyanna	C. Satyam	Geethapriya		
1967	Onde Balliya Hoogalu	Daari Kanda Bandavale	C. Satyam	Geethapriya	K. J. Yesudas	
1968	Adda Dari	"Thalu Thalelo Rangayya"	Rajan–Nagendra	Purandara Dasa		
1968	Adda Dari	"Aadise Thangi Aadise Akka"	Rajan–Nagendra	Hunsur Krishnamurthy	L. R. Eswari	
1968	Amma	Bangaaravaagali	T. G. Lingappa	G. V. Iyer	P. B. Sreenivas	
1968	Bangalore Mail	Kannugale kamalagalu	C. Satyam	Chi. Udaya Shankar	P. B. Sreenivas	
1968	Bangalore Mail	"Bangara Balayuna"	C. Satyam	Chi. Udaya Shankar	B. K. Sumithra	
1968	Bangalore Mail	Are Ja Jaa	C. Satyam	Chi. Udaya Shankar		
1968	Chinnari Puttanna	Roopayi Thanodi Banthu	T. G. Lingappa	G. V. Iyer	P. B. Sreenivas	
1968	Chinnari Puttanna	Hoovathandu Maridalu	T. G. Lingappa	G. V. Iyer	Renuka & Bangalore Latha	
1968	Chinnari Puttanna	Madhumagalu Neenamma	T. G. Lingappa	G. V. Iyer	Renuka & Bangalore Latha	
1968	Dhoomakethu	Eako Ee Dina	T. G. Lingappa	Geethapriya		
1968	Goa Dalli CID 999	Love in Goa	G. K. Venkatesh	R. N. Jayagopal		
1968	Manku Dinne	Baa Bega Manamohini	Vijaya Bhaskar	Chi. Udaya Shankar	P. B. Sreenivas	
1968	Manku Dinne	Guarantee Sweet Sevevteen	Vijaya Bhaskar	Chi. Udaya Shankar	L. R. Eswari	
1968	Manku Dinne	Bengaloora Dundumalli	Vijaya Bhaskar	Sorat Aswath		
1968	Mannina Maga	"Bareyada Kaigalu"	Vijaya Bhaskar	Geethapriya		
1968	Rowdy Ranganna	O Geleya Ramaiah	C. Satyam	Chi. Udaya Shankar		
1968	Rowdy Ranganna	Kanneradu Nanage	C. Satyam	Chi. Udaya Shankar		
1968	Sarvamangala	Laali Laali	C. Satyam	Janapada Sahitya		
1968	Sarvamangala	Laali Laali (sad)	C. Satyam	Janapada Sahitya		
1968	Sarvamangala	Krishna Bidu Bidu Kopava	C. Satyam	Chi. Udaya Shankar		
1968	Sarvamangala	Thengella Thoogadi	C. Satyam	M. Nagendra Babu	T. M. Soundararajan	
1968	Simha Swapna	Angaile Aagasa Thoro	G. K. Venkatesh	Chi. Udaya Shankar	Madhavapeddi Satyam	
1969	Choori Chikkanna	Cycle Mele Banda	C. Satyam	Chi. Udaya Shankar	L. R. Eswari	
1969	Kadina Rahasya	"Ide Ide Sukha Sakha"	C. Satyam	Geethapriya	solo	
1969	Kadina Rahasya	"Gaganadalli Haaruthire"	C. Satyam	Geethapriya	P. B. Sreenivas	
1969	Kadina Rahasya	"Iko Kaanenu Naa"	C. Satyam	Geethapriya	L. R. Eswari	
1969	Mayor Muthanna	Onde Naadu	Rajan–Nagendra	Chi. Udaya Shankar		
1969	Namma Makkalu	Manase Nagaleke	Vijaya Bhaskar	R. N. Jayagopal		
1969	Namma Makkalu	Hele gelathi	Vijaya Bhaskar	R. N. Jayagopal		
1969	Namma Makkalu	Tharegala Thotadinda	Vijaya Bhaskar	R. N. Jayagopal		
1969	Namma Makkalu	Ninnolume Namagirali Tande	Vijaya Bhaskar	R. N. Jayagopal		

== 1970s ==
=== 1970 ===
Film	Song	Music director	Writer	Co-singer
Arishina Kumkuma	Arashina Kumkuma	Vijaya Bhaskar		
Arishina Kumkuma	Mannalli Kaleya	Vijaya Bhaskar		
Bhale Jodi	Aalisu o iniya	R Rathna		
Bhale Jodi	Aalisu o iniya (sad)	R Rathna		
C.I.D. Rajanna	"Yaavurappa Ninna Hesarenappa"	C Satyam		
Devara Makkalu	"Devara Makkalu Navella"	G K Venkatesh		
Devara Makkalu	"Haadi Hoovu"	G K Venkatesh		
Gejje Pooje	"Gaganavo Ello"	Vijaya Bhaskar	R. N. Jayagopal	
Gejje Pooje	"Hejje Hejjegu Honne Suriyali"	Vijaya Bhaskar	Chi. Udaya Shankar	
Gejje Pooje	"Maguve Ninna Hoonagu"	Vijaya Bhaskar	Vijaya Narasimha	
Gejje Pooje	"Panchama Vedha, Premadha Naadha"	Vijaya Bhaskar	Vijaya Narasimha	
Hasiru Thorana	"Ondu Dina Ellindalo"	Upendra Kumar		P B Srinivas
Hasiru Thorana	"Onde Thayi Makkalu"	Upendra Kumar		
Hasiru Thorana	"Nee Yaaro Eno Sakha"	Upendra Kumar		
Karulina Kare	"A Aa E Ee Kannadada"	M Ranga Rao		B K Sumitra, R N Jayagopal
Karulina Kare	"Thaja Thaja Kalle Kayi"	M Ranga Rao		
Karulina Kare	"Nannavarige Yaaru Saati"	M Ranga Rao		L R Eswari
Mr. Rajkumar	Gangi Ninmele	S. Rajeshwara Rao		P B Srinivas
Paropakari	"Kannu Reppe Ondanondu Marevude"	Upendra Kumar	Chi. Udaya Shankar	P. B. Sreenivas
Paropakari	"Hodare Hogu Nanagenu"	Upendra Kumar	Chi. Udaya Shankar	P. B. Sreenivas
Seetha	"Barede Neenu Ninna Hesara"	Vijaya Bhaskar		
Sri Krishnadevaraya (film)	"Sharanu Virupaksha Shashishekara"	T G Lingappa		
Sri Krishnadevaraya (film)	"Khana Peena"	T G Lingappa		
Sri Krishnadevaraya (film)	"Bahunanmada Poojaphala"	T G Lingappa		P B Srinivas
Sri Krishnadevaraya (film)	"Chennarasi Cheluvarasi"	T G Lingappa		P Leela
Sri Krishnadevaraya (film)	"Kalyanaadbhuta"	T G Lingappa		P. Susheela, P. B. Sreenivas
Sri Krishnadevaraya (film)	"Tirupatigirivasa"	T G Lingappa		P. Susheela, P. B. Sreenivas
Sri Krishnadevaraya (film)	"Krishnana Hesare Lokapriya"	T G Lingappa		Soolamangalam Rajalakshmi, P. B. Sreenivas
Bhale Adrushtavo Adrushta	Kandu Kandu Nee Enna	Vijaya Bhaskar		

=== 1971 ===
Film	Song	Music director	Writer	Co-singer
Shri Krishna Rukmini Satyabhama	"Nodalu Kangalu"	R. Sudarsanam	Chi. Udaya Shankar, Chi. Sadashivaiah	P. B. Sreenivas
Shri Krishna Rukmini Satyabhama	"Marethanalla Indu"	R. Sudarsanam	Chi. Udaya Shankar, Chi. Sadashivaiah	solo
Shri Krishna Rukmini Satyabhama	"Meera Ballane"	R. Sudarsanam	Chi. Udaya Shankar, Chi. Sadashivaiah	solo
Thayi Devaru	"Haayagide Ee Dina Mana"	G. K. Venkatesh	Chi. Udaya Shankar	P. B. Sreenivas

=== 1972 ===
Film	Song	Music director	Writer	Co-singer
Bhale Huchcha	"Nodu Nanna Beauty"	Rajan–Nagendra		Solo
Yaava Janmada Maitri	"Manjula Naada"	Vijaya Bhaskar	Geethapriya	solo
Yaava Janmada Maitri	"Ananda Kanda"	Vijaya Bhaskar	Geethapriya	L. R. Anjali

=== 1973 ===
Film	Song	Music director	Writer	Co-singer
Gandhada Gudi	"Ellu Hogolla"	Rajan–Nagendra	Chi. Udaya Shankar	P. B. Sreenivas
Kesarina Kamala	"Manjina Hani Thampu"	Vijaya Bhaskar	R. N. Jayagopal	solo
Kesarina Kamala	"Hele Gelathi Priya Madhava Baarene Endu"	Vijaya Bhaskar	R. N. Jayagopal	solo

=== 1974 ===
Film	Song	Music director	Writer	Co-singer
Bhootayyana Maga Ayyu	"Malenaada Henna"	G. K. Venkatesh	Chi. Udaya Shankar	P. B. Sreenivas
Eradu Kanasu	"Thamnam Thamnam"	Rajan–Nagendra	Chi. Udaya Shankar	P. B. Sreenivas
Eradu Kanasu	"Poojisalendhe Hoogala Tande"	Rajan–Nagendra	Chi. Udaya Shankar	solo
Eradu Kanasu	"Indu Enage Govindha"	Rajan–Nagendra	Raghavendra Swamy	solo
Upasane	"Aacharavillada Naalige"	Vijaya Bhaskar	Purandaradasa	solo
Upasane	"Bharatha Bhooshira"	Vijaya Bhaskar	Vijaya Narasimha	solo

=== 1975 ===
Film	Song	Music director	Writer	Co-singer
Kalla Kulla	"Saaka Ishte Saaka"	Rajan–Nagendra	Chi. Udaya Shankar	P. Susheela
Kalla Kulla	"Madana Prema Sadana"	Rajan–Nagendra	Chi. Udaya Shankar	P. B. Sreenivas

=== 1976 ===
Film	Song	Music director	Writer	Co-singer
Bangarada Gudi	"Hayagide Hithavagide"	G. K. Venkatesh	Chi. Udaya Shankar	solo
Bangarada Gudi	"Avasaravethake Nillu"	G. K. Venkatesh	Chi. Udaya Shankar	P. B. Srinivas
Bangarada Gudi	"Thayya Thakka"	G. K. Venkatesh	Chi. Udaya Shankar	S. P. Balasubrahmanyam
Bayalu Daari	"Baanallu Neene, Bhuviyallu Neene"	Rajan–Nagendra	Chi. Udaya Shankar	solo
Bayalu Daari	"Baanallu Neene, Bhuviyallu Neene" (sad)	Rajan–Nagendra	Chi. Udaya Shankar	solo
Naa Ninna Mareyalare	"Nannaseya Hoove"	Rajan–Nagendra	Chi. Udaya Shankar	Rajkumar
Naa Ninna Mareyalare	"Ellelli Nodali"	Rajan–Nagendra	Chi. Udaya Shankar	Rajkumar
Naa Ninna Mareyalare	"Sihi Muthu Sihi Muthu"	Rajan–Nagendra	Chi. Udaya Shankar	
Phalitamsha	"Annorella Annali"	Vijaya Bhaskar		solo
Premada Kanike	"Putta Putta"	Upendra Kumar	Vijaya Narasimha	Rajkumar

=== 1977 ===
Film	Song	Music director	Writer	Co-singer
Hemavathi	"Shiva Shiva Yendhare"	L. Vaidhyanadhan	Chi. Udaya Shankar	Solo
Kiladi Jodi	"Naachike Inneke"	Rajan–Nagendra	Chi. Udaya Shankar	S. Janaki
Kiladi Jodi	"Krishnaswamy Ramaswamy"	Rajan–Nagendra	Chi. Udaya Shankar	S. Janaki
Kiladi Jodi	"Kanasinali Nodidenu"	Rajan–Nagendra	Chi. Udaya Shankar	S. Janaki
Kokila	"Sanje Thangaali Mai Sokalu"	Salil Chowdhury	Chi. Udaya Shankar	solo

=== 1979 ===
Film	Song	Music director	Writer	Co-singer
Adalu Badalu	"Prayada Vayasige"	Vijaya Bhaskar	Doddarange Gowda	S. P. Balasubrahmanyam
Bhoolokadalli Yamaraja	"Ye Muddyaa"	C. Ashwath	Bhangi Raja	solo
Bhoolokadalli Yamaraja	"Ninna Myaage"	C. Ashwath	Doddarange Gowda	S. P. Balasubrahmanyam, Vani Jairam
Bhoolokadalli Yamaraja	"Youvvana Mojina Aananda"	C. Ashwath	Doddarange Gowda	S. P. Balasubrahmanyam
Chandanada Gombe	"Ee Binka Bidu Bidu	Rajan–Nagendra	Chi. Udaya Shankar	S. P. Balasubrahmanyam
Chandanada Gombe	"Maneyanu Belagide"	Rajan–Nagendra	Chi. Udaya Shankar	S. P. Balasubrahmanyam
Chandanada Gombe	"Kangalu Thumbiralu"	Rajan–Nagendra	Chi. Udaya Shankar	solo
Putani Agent 123	"Putaani Agent 123"	Rajan–Nagendra	N/A	S. P. Balasubrahmanyam, Rajeshwari
Putani Agent 123	"Yeno Santhosha"	Rajan–Nagendra	N/A	S. P. Balasubrahmanyam
Putani Agent 123	"Sahyaadri Saalinale"	Rajan–Nagendra	N/A	solo

=== 1978 ===
Film	Song	Music director	Writer	Co-singer
Thayige Thakka Maga	"Chali Chali"	T. G. Lingappa	Chi. Udaya Shankar	Rajkumar
Vasantha Lakshmi	"Hennugalendoo Abaleyaralla"	Vijaya Bhaskar	Chi. Udaya Shankar	Vani Jairam
Vasantha Lakshmi	"Kannu Kannu Bittukondu"	Vijaya Bhaskar	Chi. Udaya Shankar	S. P. Balasubrahmanyam, K. J. Yesudas, Vani Jairam
Vasantha Lakshmi	"Kannu Kannu Bittukondu"	Vijaya Bhaskar	R. N. Jayagopal	solo

== 1980s ==
=== 1980 ===
Film	Song	Composer(s)	Writer(s)	Co-artist(s)
Janma Janmada Anubandha	"Yaava Shilpi Kanda Kanasu"	Ilaiyaraaja	Chi. Udaya Shankar	S. P. Balasubrahmanyam
Janma Janmada Anubandha	"Aakashadinda Jaari"	Ilaiyaraaja	Chi. Udaya Shankar	S. P. Balasubrahmanyam
Janma Janmada Anubandha	"Thangaliyalli Naanu"	Ilaiyaraaja	Chi. Udaya Shankar	solo
Jari Bidda Jana	"Yelle Madhavanu"	T. G. Lingappa	Chi. Udaya Shankar	solo
Kaalinga	"Thayi Thande Ibbaru"	C. Satyam	Chi. Udaya Shankar	Vani Jairam
Kaalinga	"Bhayavanu Sidu"	C. Satyam	Chi. Udaya Shankar	Malaysia Vasudevan
Manjina There	"Noduve Ideke"	Upendra Kumar	Chi. Udaya Shankar	solo
Manjina There	"Joke"	Upendra Kumar	Chi. Udaya Shankar	solo
Maria My Darling	"Hoovanthe Naanu Olidaga"	Shankar–Ganesh	Chi. Udaya Shankar	solo
Vasantha Geetha	"Haayada Ee Sanje"	M. Ranga Rao	Chi. Udaya Shankar	Rajkumar

=== 1981 ===
Film	Song	Composer(s)	Writer(s)	Co-artist(s)
Antha	"Baaramma Illi Baaramma"	G. K. Venkatesh	Chi. Udaya Shankar, R. N. Jayagopal, Geethapriya	S. P. Balasubrahmanyam
Antha	"Deepaveke Beku"	G. K. Venkatesh	Chi. Udaya Shankar, R. N. Jayagopal, Geethapriya	solo
Antha	"Premavide"	G. K. Venkatesh	Chi. Udaya Shankar, R. N. Jayagopal, Geethapriya	solo
Antha	"Ninna Aata"	G. K. Venkatesh	Chi. Udaya Shankar, R. N. Jayagopal, Geethapriya	solo
Avala Hejje	"Bandeya Baalina Belakaagi"	Rajan-Nagendra	Chi. Udaya Shankar	S. P. Balasubrahmanyam
Avala Hejje	"Aakasha Neeragali"	Rajan-Nagendra	Chi. Udaya Shankar	S. P. Balasubrahmanyam
Avala Hejje	"Devara Aata"	Rajan-Nagendra	Chi. Udaya Shankar	solo
Bhaari Bharjari Bete	"Sweety Nanna Jodi"	Ilaiyaraaja	Chi. Udaya Shankar	S. P. Balasubrahmanyam
Bhaari Bharjari Bete	"Yarigaagi Ee Aata"	Ilaiyaraaja	Chi. Udaya Shankar	solo
Bhaari Bharjari Bete	"Ammamma"	Ilaiyaraaja	R. N. Jayagopal	solo
Bhoomige Banda Bhagavantha	"Nagauvenu"	G. K. Venkatesh	Chi. Udaya Shankar	Vani Jairam
Garjane	"Bandeya Bandeya"	Ilaiyaraaja	Sreekumaran Thampi	S. P. Balasubrahmanyam
Garjane	"Kanna Minchinda"	Ilaiyaraaja	Sreekumaran Thampi	S. P. Balasubrahmanyam
Garjane	"Hathavagidhe"	Ilaiyaraaja	Sreekumaran Thampi	P. Jayachandran
Geetha	"Yene Kelu"	Ilaiyaraaja	Chi. Udaya Shankar	S. P. Balasubrahmanyam
Geetha	"Nanna Jeeva"	Ilaiyaraaja	Chi. Udaya Shankar	S. P. Balasubrahmanyam
Geetha	"Jotheyali"	Ilaiyaraaja	Chi. Udaya Shankar	S. P. Balasubrahmanyam
Guru Shishyaru	"Ninagagi Ella Ninagagi"	K. V. Mahadevan	Chi. Udaya Shankar	S. P. Balasubrahmanyam
Guru Shishyaru	"Naachi Odidanu Madana"	K. V. Mahadevan	Chi. Udaya Shankar	S. P. Balasubrahmanyam
Guru Shishyaru	"Deenala Moreya"	K. V. Mahadevan	Chi. Udaya Shankar	P. Susheela
Guru Shishyaru	"Jaya Jaya Samba Sadashiva"	K. V. Mahadevan	Chi. Udaya Shankar	solo
Maha Prachandaru	"Suralokada"	Upendra Kumar	N/A	P. B. Sreenivas
Maha Prachandaru	"Shileyalli"	Upendra Kumar	N/A	solo
Naga Kala Bhairava	"Naguvude"	M. Ranga Rao	Chi. Udaya Shankar	Vishnuvardhan
Preethisi Nodu	"Balli Hoovigaasare"	Vijaya Bhaskar	Geethapriya	S. P. Balasubrahmanyam
Preethisi Nodu	"Prema Vemba Pandyadalli"	Vijaya Bhaskar	Geethapriya	solo

=== 1982 ===
Film	Song	Composer(s)	Writer(s)	Co-artist(s)
Baadada Hoo	Hoova Nodu Entha Andavagide"	L. Vaidyanathan	Chi. Udaya Shankar	S. Janaki
Baadada Hoo	"Neenendu Baadada Hoo"	L. Vaidyanathan	Chi. Udaya Shankar	S. Janaki
Baadada Hoo	"Aase Noorase"	L. Vaidyanathan	Chi. Udaya Shankar	solo
Hasyaratna Ramakrishna	"Iddhu Hogu"	T. G. Lingappa	Chi. Udaya Shankar	K. J. Yesudas
Hasyaratna Ramakrishna	"Krishna Karedaaga"	T. G. Lingappa	Chi. Udaya Shankar	solo
Hasyaratna Ramakrishna	"Mellage Kai Kotthu"	T. G. Lingappa	Chi. Udaya Shankar	solo
Hasyaratna Ramakrishna	"Nanu Neenu Iniya"	T. G. Lingappa	Chi. Udaya Shankar	solo
Hasyaratna Ramakrishna	"Enu Chenna"	T. G. Lingappa	Chi. Udaya Shankar	solo
Hosa Belaku	"Theredide Mane"	M. Ranga Rao	Kuvempu	Vani Jairam
Hosa Belaku	"Ravi Neenu Aagasadinda"	M. Ranga Rao	Chi. Udaya Shankar	Rajkumar
Hosa Belaku	"Cheluveye Ninna Nodalu"	M. Ranga Rao	Chi. Udaya Shankar	Rajkumar
Hosa Belaku	"Hosa Belaku"	M. Ranga Rao	Chi. Udaya Shankar	Rajkumar

=== 1983 ===
Film	Song	Composer(s)	Writer(s)	Co-artist(s)
Ananda Bhairavi	"Malagiruveya Ranganatha"	Ramesh Naidu	N/A	S. P. Balasubrahmanyam
Gandugali Rama	"Appa Ramanna"	C. Satyam	Chi. Udaya Shankar	S. P. Balasubrahmanyam
Gedda Maga	"Ondu Gandu Hennu"	K. Chakravarthy		S. P. Balasubrahmanyam
Gedda Maga	"Ravigintha Shashiye"	K. Chakravarthy		S. P. Balasubrahmanyam
Gedda Maga	"Minchanthe Minchi"	K. Chakravarthy		S. P. Balasubrahmanyam
Gedda Maga	"Love Me, Allow Me"	K. Chakravarthy		S. P. Balasubrahmanyam
Gedda Maga	"Benkiyanu Muttuveya"	K. Chakravarthy		Ramesh
Geluvu Nannade	"Rojabeku Rojabeku"	T. G. Lingappa	N/A	S. P. Balasubrahmanyam
Geluvu Nannade	"Thom Thananam"	T. G. Lingappa	N/A	S. N. Surendar
Hasida Hebbuli	"Savinenappu Yemanathe"	C. Satyam	N/A	S. Janaki
Hasida Hebbuli	"Praaya Matherithe"	C. Satyam		S. Janaki
Hasida Hebbuli	"Ee Rathraadi Namakkaagi"	C. Satyam	S. Surendran	
Kranthiyogi Basavanna	"Shiva Shiva Mahadeva"	M. Ranga Rao	Maate Mahadevi	S. P. Balasubrahmanyam
Kranthiyogi Basavanna	"Januma Janumantarada"	M. Ranga Rao	Maate Mahadevi	S. P. Balasubrahmanyam
Sididedda Sahodara	"Hareyavu Karedide"	C. Satyam	R. N. Jayagopal	S. P. Balasubrahmanyam, Vani Jairam
Sididedda Sahodara	"Nanna Sama Yarilla"	C. Satyam	R. N. Jayagopal	S. P. Balasubrahmanyam
Sididedda Sahodara	"Beda Annuvarunte"	C. Satyam	Vishnuvardhan	Chi. Udaya Shankar

=== 1984 ===
Film	Song	Composer(s)	Writer(s)	Co-artist(s)
Madhuve Madu Tamashe Nodu	"Santhoshada"	Vijayanand	R. N. Jayagopal	S. P. Balasubrahmanyam
Thaliya Bhagya	"Savira Mathugalethake"	C. Satyam	Chi. Udaya Shankar	S. P. Balasubrahmanyam
Thaliya Bhagya	"Kaka Ennuve Eke"	C. Satyam	Chi. Udaya Shankar	solo
Apoorva Sangama	"Aralide Thanu Mana"	Upendra Kumar	Chi. Udaya Shankar	Dr. Rajkumar
Apoorva Sangama	"Thaara O Thaara"	Upendra Kumar	Chi. Udaya Shankar	Dr. Rajkumar
Bandhana	"Banna Nanna Olavina"	M. Ranga Rao	R. N. Jayagopal	S. P. Balasubrahmanyam
Bandhana	"Ee Bandhana"	M. Ranga Rao	R. N. Jayagopal	K. J. Yesudas
Samayada Gombe	"Kogile Haadide Kelideya"	M. Ranga Rao	Chi. Udaya Shankar	Dr. Rajkumar
Samayada Gombe	"Nanna Saradara"	M. Ranga Rao	Chi. Udaya Shankar	Dr. Rajkumar
Samayada Gombe	"Sankochava Bidu"	M. Ranga Rao	Chi. Udaya Shankar	Dr. Rajkumar
Yarivanu	"Raagavo Anuragavo"	Rajan-Nagendra	Chi. Udaya Shankar	Dr. Rajkumar

=== 1985 ===
Film	Song	Composer(s)	Writer(s)	Co-artist(s)
Bidugadeya Bedi	"Eno Hosa Santhoshade	Rajan–Nagendra	R. N. Jayagopal	S. P. Balasubrahmanyam
Bidugadeya Bedi	"Manasugala Savi Milama"	Rajan–Nagendra	R. N. Jayagopal	S. P. Balasubrahmanyam
Bidugadeya Bedi	"Olavina Sarigama"	Rajan–Nagendra	R. N. Jayagopal	S. P. Balasubrahmanyam
Dhruva Thare	"Nyayavelli Adagide"	Upendra Kumar	Chi. Upendra Kumar	Raj Kumar
Hosa Neeru	"Neene Indu Prema Veene"	G. K. Venkatesh	R. N. Jayagopal	S. P. Balasubrahmanyam
Hosa Neeru	"Koreva Chaliyali"	G. K. Venkatesh	R. N. Jayagopal	S. P. Balasubrahmanyam
Hosa Neeru	"Olavu Thanda Besuge"	G. K. Venkatesh	R. N. Jayagopal	S. P. Balasubrahmanyam
Hosa Neeru	"Naavella Ondagi"	G. K. Venkatesh	R. N. Jayagopal	S. P. Balasubrahmanyam
Jeevana Chakra	"Ananda Ananda"	Rajan–Nagendra	Chi. Udaya Shankar	S. P. Balasubrahmanyam
Jeevana Chakra	"Aakashavu Ee Bhoomiyu"	Rajan–Nagendra	Chi. Udaya Shankar	S. P. Balasubrahmanyam
Jeevana Chakra	"Olleya Vayaside"	Rajan–Nagendra	Chi. Udaya Shankar	S. P. Balasubrahmanyam, Vani Jairam
Masanada Hoovu	"O Gunvantha"	Vijaya Bhaskar	N/A	solo
Savira Sullu	"Aakasha Neenadare"	Shankar–Ganesh	N/A	S. P. Balasubrahmanyam
Savira Sullu	"Hennendarenu"	Shankar–Ganesh	N/A	S. P. Balasubrahmanyam
Savira Sullu	"Intha Ganda Node Illa"	Shankar–Ganesh	N/A	S. P. Balasubrahmanyam
Swabhimana	"Doorada Oorinda Hammera Banda	Shankar–Ganesh	R. N. Jayagopal	S. P. Balasubrahmanyam
Swabhimana	"Ondu Eradu Mooru Beke"	Shankar–Ganesh	R. N. Jayagopal	S. P. Balasubrahmanyam

=== 1986 ===
Film	Song	Composer(s)	Writer(s)	Co-artist(s)
Anuraga Aralithu	"Ganga Yamuna Sangama"	Upendra Kumar	Chi. Udaya Shankar	Raj Kumar
Ee Jeeva Ninagagi	"Mannisu Endodane"	Vijayanand		S. P. Balasubrahmanyam
Hosa Neeru	"Neene Indu Prema Veene"	G. K. Venkatesh	R. N. Jayagopal	S. P. Balasubrahmanyam
Hosa Neeru	"Koreva Chaliyali"	G. K. Venkatesh	R. N. Jayagopal	S. P. Balasubrahmanyam
Hosa Neeru	"Olavu Thanda Besuge"	G. K. Venkatesh	R. N. Jayagopal	S. P. Balasubrahmanyam
Hosa Neeru	"Naavella Ondagi"	G. K. Venkatesh	R. N. Jayagopal	S. P. Balasubrahmanyam
Krishna Nee Begane Baro	"Mummy Mummy"	Bappi Lahiri	N/A	S. P. Balasubrahmanyam
Krishna Nee Begane Baro	"Aalare Aalare"	Bappi Lahiri	N/A	solo
Krishna Nee Begane Baro	"Ee Radhege"	Bappi Lahiri	N/A	solo
Mrugaalaya	"Mella Mellane"	Rajan–Nagendra	Purandara Dasa	solo
Ratha Sapthami	"Shilegalu Sangeethava"	Upendra Kumar	Chi. Udaya Shankar	S. P. Balasubrahmanyam
Ratha Sapthami	"Jotheyagi Hithavagi"	Upendra Kumar	Chi. Udaya Shankar	S. P. Balasubrahmanyam
Sathya Jyothi	"Nee Needida Prema"	Ilaiyaraaja	Chi. Udaya Shankar	S. P. Balasubrahmanyam

=== 1987 ===
Film	Song	Composer(s)	Writer(s)	Co-artist(s)
Jayasimha	"Andha Andha"	Vijayanand	Chi. Udaya Shankar	S. P. Balasubrahmanyam
Jayasimha	"Appa Amma"	Vijayanand	Chi. Udaya Shankar	S. P. Balasubrahmanyam
Manamecchida Hudugi	"Gowramma Ninna Ganda"	Upendra Kumar	N/A	S. P. Balasubrahmanyam
Manamecchida Hudugi	"Ninnane naanu Benkiyallu Thampu Kandenu"	Upendra Kumar	N/A	S. P. Balasubrahmanyam
Manamecchida Hudugi	"Halligella Ivane Chenda"	Upendra Kumar	N/A	solo
Premaloka	"Premalokadinda"	Hamsalekha	Hamsalekha	K J Yesudas
Premaloka	"Cheluve Ondu Kelthini"	Hamsalekha	Hamsalekha	S P Balasubrahmanyam
Premaloka	"E Gangu Ee Biku Kalisikodu"	Hamsalekha	Hamsalekha	S P Balasubrahmanyam
Premaloka	"Idu Nanna Ninna Prema Geethe"	Hamsalekha	Hamsalekha	S P Balasubrahmanyam
Premaloka	"Yaarivanu Ee Manmathanu"	Hamsalekha	Hamsalekha	solo
Premaloka	"Boy Friend Barthaanantha"	Hamsalekha	Hamsalekha	solo
Shruthi Seridaaga	"Shruthi Seride"	T. G. Lingappa	Chi. Udaya Shankar	Rajkumar
Shruthi Seridaaga	"Kanasalli Bandavanare"	T. G. Lingappa	Chi. Udaya Shankar	solo
Shruthi Seridaaga	"Honnina"	T. G. Lingappa	Chi. Udaya Shankar	solo
Shubha Milana	"Milana Milana"	M. Ranga Rao		S. P. Balasubrahmanyam
Shubha Milana	"Ee Chanchale Kuniyuvanthe"	M. Ranga Rao		S. P. Balasubrahmanyam
Shubha Milana	"Baalu Pranaya Geethe"	M. Ranga Rao		S. P. Balasubrahmanyam
Shubha Milana	"Krishnana Haage"	M. Ranga Rao		S. P. Balasubrahmanyam
Shubha Milana	"Geleya Heege"	M. Ranga Rao		S. P. Balasubrahmanyam
Vijayotsava	"Sarigamapaga Paga"	M. Ranga Rao		S. P. Balasubrahmanyam

=== 1988 ===
Film	Song	Composer(s)	Writer(s)	Co-artist(s)
Brahma Vishnu Maheshwara	"Rathri Vele"	Vijayanand	Chi. Udaya Shankar	S. P. Balasubrahmanyam
Brahma Vishnu Maheshwara	"Hudugiya Chenna"	Vijayanand	Chi. Udaya Shankar	S. P. Balasubrahmanyam
Ranadheera	"Baa Baaro Baaro Ranadheera"	Hamsalekha	Hamsalekha	S. P. Balasubrahmanyam
Ranadheera	"Preethi Maadabaaradu"	Hamsalekha	Hamsalekha	S. P. Balasubrahmanyam
Ranadheera	"Naavindu Haado Haadige Kone Illa"	Hamsalekha	Hamsalekha	S. P. Balasubrahmanyam
Ranadheera	"Yaare Neenu Sundara Cheluve"	Hamsalekha	Hamsalekha	S. P. Balasubrahmanyam
Samyuktha	"Thangaaliyagi Hode"	Singeetham Srinivasa Rao	Chi. Udaya Shankar	solo

=== 1989 ===
Film	Song	Composer(s)	Writer(s)	Co-artist(s)
Deva	"Devanna Nina Mele"	Upendra Kumar	M. N. Vyasa Rao	S. P. Balasubrahmanyam
Deva	"Koragi Koragi"	Upendra Kumar	Chi. Udaya Shankar	solo
Jai Karnataka	"Hawa Hawaii"	Vijayanand	N/A	solo
Kindari Jogi	"Gange Baare Thunge Baare	Hamsalekha	Hamsalekha	S. P. Balasubrahmanyam
Kindari Jogi	"Kottalo Kottalamma"	Hamsalekha	Hamsalekha	S. P. Balasubrahmanyam
Kindari Jogi	"Ooru Uddara Madtheenantha "	Hamsalekha	Hamsalekha	S. P. Balasubrahmanyam
Kindari Jogi	"Aagallampe Hoogallampe"	Hamsalekha	Hamsalekha	S. P. Balasubrahmanyam
Kindari Jogi	"Chendina Baale"	Hamsalekha	Hamsalekha	S. P. Balasubrahmanyam
Kindari Jogi	"Haalakki Koogaithu"	Hamsalekha	Hamsalekha	S. P. Balasubrahmanyam
Yuddha Kaanda	"Sole Illa" (duet)	Hamsalekha	Hamsalekha	S. P. Balasubrahmanyam
Yuddha Kaanda	"Sole Illa" (sad)	Hamsalekha	Hamsalekha	S. P. Balasubrahmanyam

== 1990s ==
=== 1990 ===
Film	Song	Composer(s)	Writer(s)	Co-artist(s)
Aata Bombata	"Kalidasananje Aayithu"	Hamsalekha	Hamsalekha	
Bannada Gejje	"Swathi Mutthina Male Haniye"	Hamsalekha		S. P. Balasubrahmanyam
Bannada Gejje	"Dance Dance"	Hamsalekha		S. P. Balasubrahmanyam
Bannada Gejje	"Jodusthinayyo Brahma Ninge"	Hamsalekha		S. P. Balasubrahmanyam
Bannada Gejje	"Prema Geema Jaanedo"	Hamsalekha		Ramesh
Bannada Gejje	"Ee Bannada Gejje"	Hamsalekha		Ramesh
Aavesha	"Dhwani Dhwani Prathidhwani"	Hamsalekha	Hamsalekha	K. J. Yesudas
Aavesha	"Saptaswarada Madhuram"	Hamsalekha	Hamsalekha	S. P. Balasubrahmanyam
Aavesha	"Viraha Thaanariye"	Hamsalekha	Hamsalekha	
Agni Divya	"Aase Gaali Beeside"	Shyam		

=== 1991 ===
Film	Song	Composer(s)	Writer(s)	Co-artist(s)
Halli Rambhe Belli Bombe	"Halli Rambhe Anthare"	Upendra Kumar	Chi. Udaya Shankar	solo
Halli Rambhe Belli Bombe	"Rama Ennalenu"	Upendra Kumar	Chi. Udaya Shankar	solo
Halli Rambhe Belli Bombe	"Eko Kaane Nange Nachike"	Upendra Kumar	Chi. Udaya Shankar	S. P. Balasubrahmanyam
Police Matthu Dada	"O Nannase"	Bappi Lahiri	N/A	S. P. Balasubrahmanyam
Police Matthu Dada	"Naanu Garam Garam"	Bappi Lahiri	N/A	S. P. Balasubrahmanyam
Police Matthu Dada	"Ee Balla Geethike"	Bappi Lahiri	N/A	solo
Shanti Kranti	"Madhyarathrili"	Hamsalekha	N/A	S. P. Balasubrahmanyam, Mano & chorus
Shanti Kranti	"Swathantra Baanali"	Hamsalekha	N/A	S. P. Balasubrahmanyam
Shanti Kranti	"Gaaliyo Gaaliyo"	Hamsalekha	N/A	S. P. Balasubrahmanyam
Shanti Kranti	"Aaane Mele"	Hamsalekha	N/A	S. P. Balasubrahmanyam
Shanti Kranti	"Anatha Bhanduve"	Hamsalekha	N/A	S. P. Balasubrahmanyam
Shanti Kranti	"Bandano Yamaraya"	Hamsalekha	N/A	S. P. Balasubrahmanyam
Shanti Kranti	"Huttodyaake Saayodyaake"	Hamsalekha	N/A	solo

=== 1992 ===
Film	Song	Composer(s)	Writer(s)	Co-artist(s)
Belli Kalungura	"Belli Kalungura"	Hamsalekha	Hamsalekha	K. S. Chithra
Belli Kalungura	"Onde Ondu (female Version)"	Hamsalekha	Hamsalekha	
Belli Modagalu	"Male Billa Singara"	Upendra Kumar	K. V. Raju	Mano
Belli Modagalu	"Hrudayave Ninna Hesarige"	Upendra Kumar	K. V. Raju	Mano
Belli Modagalu	"Bhoomiyali Chandirana"	Upendra Kumar	K. V. Raju	solo
Chikkejamanru	"Rama Rama Rama	Hamsalekha	Hamsalekha	S. P. Balasubrahmanyam
Chikkejamanru	"Sobane Enniramma"	Hamsalekha	Hamsalekha	S. P. Balasubrahmanyam
Chikkejamanru	"Rama Rama Rama (sad)	Hamsalekha	Hamsalekha	S. P. Balasubrahmanyam
Gopi Krishna	"Oho Vasantha"	Hamsalekha	Hamsalekha	K. J. Yesudas
Gopi Krishna	"Jagavella Jagavella"	Hamsalekha	Hamsalekha	Mano
Gopi Krishna	"En Uduge Idu"	Hamsalekha	Hamsalekha	Mano, Latha Hamsalekha
Halli Meshtru	"Kaayi Kaayi Nugge Kaayi"	Hamsalekha	Hamsalekha	S. P. Balasubrahmanyam
Halli Meshtru	"Sankranthi Bantu"	Hamsalekha	Hamsalekha	S. P. Balasubrahmanyam
Halli Meshtru	"Halli Meshtre Halli Meshtre"	Hamsalekha	Hamsalekha	S. P. Balasubrahmanyam
Halli Meshtru	"Preeti Maadu Tappenilla"	Hamsalekha	Hamsalekha	K. J. Yesudas
Halli Meshtru	"Akka Nin Ganda"	Hamsalekha	Hamsalekha	solo
Mannina Doni	"Kogileye Kshemave"	Hamsalekha	Hamsalekha	solo
Police Lockup	"Jumma Chekka"	V. Manohar	V. Manohar	S. P. Balasubrahmanyam
Ravivarma	"Ododi Hoguva"	Upendra Kumar	Chi. Udaya Shankar, Shyansundar Kulkarni	Mano
Ravivarma	"Ravivarma Baredanta"	Upendra Kumar	Chi. Udaya Shankar, Shyansundar Kulkarni	Mano
Ravivarma	"Sogasu Kanna"	Upendra Kumar	Chi. Udaya Shankar, Shyansundar Kulkarni	solo
Shakthi Yukthi	"Nee Muttudre"	Manoranjan Prabhakar	N/A	S. Janaki

=== 1993 ===
Film	Song	Composer(s)	Writer(s)	Co-artist(s)
Annayya	"Bomne Bombe"	Hamsalekha		S. P. Balasubrahmanyam
Annayya	"Annayya Annayya"	Hamsalekha		solo
Mane Devru	"Neene Nanna Neene Nanna"	Hamsalekha	Hamsalekha	S. P. Balasubrahmanyam
Mane Devru	"Thappu Madodu Sahaja Kano"	Hamsalekha	Hamsalekha	S. P. Balasubrahmanyam
Mane Devru	"Sundari Sundari"	Hamsalekha	Hamsalekha	S. P. Balasubrahmanyam

=== 1994 ===
Film	Song	Composer(s)	Writer(s)	Co-artist(s)
Rasika	"Chitapata Chitapata"	Hamsalekha	Hamsalekha	S. P. Balasubrahmanyam
Rasika	"Yavvo Yaako Maige"	Hamsalekha	Hamsalekha	S. P. Balasubrahmanyam

=== 1995 ===
Film	Song	Composer(s)	Writer(s)	Co-artist(s)
Dheerga Sumangali	"Kaviya Samaya"	Hamsalekha		S. P. Balasubrahmanyam
Dheerga Sumangali	"Baila Baila"	Hamsalekha		solo
Dore	"Thai Thai Thai"	Hamsalekha	Hamsalekha	Mano
Ganeshana Galate	"Bhagyada Lakshmi Bandaaythu"	Rajan–Nagendra	N/A	S. P. Balasubrahmanyam
Ganeshana Galate	"Come Come Darling"	Rajan–Nagendra		solo
Ganeshana Galate	"Killer Naane Killer"	Rajan–Nagendra		solo
Himapatha	"Ee Kanchana Ganga""	Hamsalekha	Hamsalekha	S. P. Balasubrahmanyam
Himapatha	"Doiradinda Bande"	Hamsalekha	Hamsalekha	solo
Kona Edaithe	"Jackie Chan"	Hamsalekha	Hamsalekha	Rajesh Krishnan

=== 2000s and 2010s ===
Year	Film	Song	Composer(s)	Writer(s)	Co-artist(s)
2006	Savira Mettilu	"Saavira Mettilu Hatthi Banni"	Vijaya Bhaskar		P. B. Sreenivas
2008	Mandakini	"Chandra Vandane"	K. Kalyan	Ramesh Surve	solo
2009	Jhossh	"Jothe Jotheyalli"	Vardhan	Kaviraj	S. P. Balasubrahmanyam, Anuradha Bhat, Harsha
