= Jigri Dost =

1969 film by Ravikant Nagaich

- Theatrical release poster
- Directed by: Ravikant Nagaich
- Written by: Vishwamittar Adil (dialogues)
- Story by: A. K. Velan
- Based on: Emme Thammanna (1966)
- Produced by: Doondi; Sunderlal Nahata
- Starring: Jeetendra; Mumtaz; Poonam Sinha
- Cinematography: Ravikant Nagaich
- Edited by: N. S. Prakash
- Music by: Laxmikant–Pyarelal
- Production company: Vijaya Lakhshmi Pictures
- Release date: 7 November 1969
- Running time: 155 minutes
- Country: India
- Language: Hindi
- Box office: 2.7 crore

Jigri Dost (transl. Best Friend) is a 1969 Hindi-language comedy film, produced by Sunderlal Nahata and Dhoondy under the Vijaya Lakhshmi Pictures banner and directed by Ravikant Nagaich. It stars Jeetendra, Mumtaz and Poonam Sinha and music composed by Laxmikant–Pyarelal. The heroine Komal in the movie is actually Poonam Sinha, Shatrughan Sinha's wife. The film is a remake of 1966 Kannada movie Emme Thammanna, which had earlier been remade in Telugu in 1968 as Govula Gopanna and which later went on to be remade in Tamil in 1970 as Maattukara Velan.

== Cast ==
- Jeetendra as Gopi and Advocate Anand (dual role)
- Mumtaz as Shobha N. Das
- Poonam Sinha as Komal
- Agha as Advocate Narayan Das
- K. N. Singh as Chairman Neelkanth
- Jagdeep as Kasturi
- Prem Kumar as Jagawar
- Nirupa Roy as Annapurna N. Das
- Aruna Irani as Neelkanth's maidservant

== Soundtrack ==
#	Title	Singer(s)
1	"Dil Mein Kya Hai (Revival)"	Lata Mangeshkar, Mohammed Rafi
2	"Dil Men Kya Hai Tere"	Lata Mangeshkar, Mohammed Rafi
3	"Mere Des Mein Pavan Chale Purvai"	Mohammed Rafi
4	"Raat Suhani Jaag Rahi Hain"	Mohammed Rafi, Suman Kalyanpur
5	"Tirchhi Topi Wale"	Lata Mangeshkar
6	"Phool Hai Baharon Ka"	Lata Mangeshkar, Mohammed Rafi
