= Dikki Madhava Rao =

- Born: Murali Madhava Rao; 15 January 1919; Mysore, Kingdom of Mysore
- Died: 14 July 1985 (aged 66)
- Occupations: Actor; singer
- Children: 5

Dikki Madhava Rao (born Murali Madhava Rao; 15 January 1919 – 14 July 1985) was an Indian actor and singer known for his work as a character actor in Kannada-language films. He spent much of his early years as a stage actor in the 1920s and 1930s before appearing in Kannada films. He gained popularity with his role as the antagonist Kanyakumari Dikshit "Dikki" in the 1936 film Samsara Nauka. Subsequently, the name stuck to him as prefix.

As a stage actor, Rao worked with theatre companies of Mohammed Peer, H. L. N. Simha and B. R. Panthulu. Subsequently, he became a frequent collaborator of the latter two and D. Shankar Singh in films, and in a film career spanning four decades, appeared in 120 films.

== Biography ==
Madhava Rao was born on 15 January 1919 in Mysore. He was educated at the city's Wesley Mission School where H. L. N. Simha and Mohammed Peer, who would go on to become filmmaker and playwrights respectively, were his seniors. Rao was drawn towards stage acting during his school days and was spotted and cast by A. V. Varadachar in his stage plays produced by Ratnavali Theatrical Company. Rao went on to play a variety of roles for Mohammed Peer's Chandrakala Nataka Company, Gubbi Veeranna's company and Chamundeshwari Nataka Sabha; he was mostly cast to play negative-shaded characters.

In his first film, Samsara Nauka (1936), Rao played Kanyakumari Dikshit "Dikki", alongside B. R. Panthulu and M. V. Rajamma; he also scored music for the film. He appeared in the Tamil-Kannada bilingual film, Modala Thedi (1955) and also playback-sang for the first time, "Ondarinda Ippattara Varegu", a song that became popular during the time. He played a traitor in Kittur Chennamma (1961). In Bhakta Chetha, he played the villainous Beeranna. Rao played an irresponsible father of two children (played by Rajkumar and Kalpana) in Saaku Magalu (1963), who takes to squandering money. In Sri Ramanjaneya Yuddha (1963), he played sage Vishvamitra. He played Seshappa, a corporator, in the comedy film Emme Thammanna (1966). Rao's other notable performances came in Krishnaleela (1947) and Rathnagiri Rahasya (1957).

On 21 March 1979, while performing on stage in Challakere, Chitradurga, Rao suffered from paralysis on one of his legs, leaving him bedridden for six years. He died on 14 July 1985, leaving behind five children — two sons and three daughters.

== Partial filmography ==
- Samsara Nauka (1936)...Kanyakumari Dikshit "Dikki"
- Radha Ramana (1943)
- Vani (1943)
- Krishnaleela (1947)
- Shiva Parvathi (1950)
- Modala Thedi (1955)
- Shivasharane Nambekka (1955)
- Bhakta Vijaya (1956)
- Pancharathna (1956)...Paranjyoti
- Bhaktha Markandeya (1957)
- Rathnagiri Rahasya (1957)
- Varadakshine (1957)
- School Master (1958)
- Abba Aa Hudugi (1959)
- Makkala Rajya (1960)
- Kittur Chennamma (1961)
- Raja Satyavrata (1961)
- Gaali Gopura (1962)
- Shri Shaila Mahathme (1961)
- Sri Dharmasthala Mahathme (1962)
- Thejaswini (1962)
- Jeevana Tharanga (1963)
- Kanyarathna (1963)
- Paalige Bandadde Panchamrutha (1963)
- Saaku Magalu (1963)
- Mane Aliya (1964)
- Navakoti Narayana (1964)
- Sarvagna Murthy (1965)
- Emme Thammanna (1966)
- Premamayi (1966)
- Black Market (1967)
- Dhana Pishachi (1967)
- Nakkare Ade Swarga (1967)
- Onde Balliya Hoogalu (1967)
- Hoovu Mullu (1968)
- Lakshadheeshwara (1968)...Seetharamaiah
- Mannina Maga (1968)
- Simha Swapna (1968)
- Bhale Kiladi (1970)
- Anugraha (1971)
- Mukthi (1971)
- Namma Baduku (1971)
- Bangarada Kalla (1973)
- Jwala Mohini (1973)
- Chamundeshwari Mahime (1974)
- Maadi Madidavaru (1974)
- Bhagya Jyothi (1975)
- Bili Hendthi (1975)
- Mahadeshwara Pooja Phala (1975)
- Naga Kanye (1975)
- College Ranga (1976)
- Shani Prabhava (1977)
- Bhale Huduga (1978)
- Antha (1981)
- Dharmasere (1979)...Shamachar
- Udugore (1979)
- Bekkina Kannu (1984)
