= Kaviratna Kalidasa =

- Poster
- Directed by: Renuka Sharma
- Produced by: Smt Saraswathi Srinivas; V S Murali; V S Govindu
- Starring: Rajkumar; Jaya Prada; Balakrishna; Srinivasa Murthy
- Cinematography: V. K. Kannan
- Edited by: P. G. Mohan
- Music by: M. Ranga Rao
- Production company: Anandalakshmi Enterprises
- Distributed by: Vajreshwari Combines
- Release date: 18 February 1983
- Running time: 189 minutes
- Country: India
- Language: Kannada

Kaviratna Kalidasa ( transl. Poet Kalidasa) is a 1983 Kannada-language historical drama film based on the life of Kālidāsa, a renowned Classical Sanskrit writer of the 4th Century A.D. The film was directed by Renuka Sharma. The film stars Rajkumar, portraying the title role of Kalidasa, along with Jaya Pradha in the role of Vidyadhare and Srinivasa Murthy as Raja Bhoja.

The film is considered to be one of the all-time top money-grossing films in the history of Kannada movies. It was distributed by Parvathamma Rajkumar under the Vajreshwari Combines banner. The movie saw a theatrical run of 25 weeks in 19 theatres.

== Plot ==
The kingdom's chief minister wants his son to marry the king's daughter, Princess Vidyadhare. When he expresses his wish to the king, he is ridiculed. Instead, the king orders him to search for a "Sakala Vidya Paarangatha" groom for his daughter. Vowing to take revenge against the insult, the minister goes in search of a foolish groom.

Kalidasa, a humble shepherd is shown rearing his sheep. Convinced of his stupidity, the minister charms Kalidasa to accompany him to the palace, so that Kalidasa can marry the princess. Coached by the minister, Kalidasa excels in the tests conducted by Vidyadhare (Jaya Prada). The minister is shrewd enough to teach a key sentence to Kalidasa. If he can't answer a question, Kalidasa must utter "heluvudakku, keluvudakku, idu samayavalla" ("This isn't the right time to question or answer.")

Vidyadhare is fooled by Kalidasa's brilliance and marries him. However, the truth comes out during the first night. Shattered, Vidyadhare locks Kalidasa in the palace temple and gets him to demand "vidyaabuddhi" (knowledge and wisdom) from the goddess Kali. In a mystical scene, Vidyadhare loses consciousness, Goddess Kali appears and blesses Kalidasa with vidyabuddhi, who composes the Shyamala Dandakam song in praise of the goddess. Kalidasa is shown walking away from the palace-temple, implying his casting off his earlier ignorance and walking away from his previous life. Vidyadhare regains consciousness and goes in search of her husband.

Kalidasa, now a renowned poet, is one of the astadiggajas (eight great poets including Daṇḍin) in the court of King Bhoja (Srinivasa Murthy), much to the ire of the elder poet Musuri Krishnamurthy. Bhoja pleads with his dear friend Kalidasa to write a charama geethe (funeral song) for him. Kalidasa refuses since Bhoja is sure to die once he hears the song. Vidyadhare assumes the name Kaladhare, rests at a prostitute Ratnakala's home and catches Kalidasa's attention. Vidyadhare is pleased to see her husband, but Kalidasa is unaware of his former life. Kalidasa composes his best work Abhignaana Shaakuntala with romantic interests on Vidyadhare.

Bhoja can't bear the fact that his aptamitra (an intimate friend) Kalidasa is in the company of a prostitute. The differences lead to Kalidasa parting ways with Bhoja and walking out of his court. Dimdima kavi, who is blessed with a dindima from the goddess Saraswati, throws a literary challenge to Bhoja's ashtadiggajas, asking them to complete his shloka with the answer. Bhoja recalls his friend, when none can answer the question, kamale kamlotpattitih (lotus is born in a lotus). Shamed Bhoja announces that he will donate half of his kingdom to anyone who solves the puzzle. Ratnakala gets the answer from Kalidasa and poisons him. She walks into royal court, to claim half kingdom. She answers, "Eye lotuses in the face lotus of my lady."

Dimdima kavi, who could silence herds of laureates with his dimdima, catches her fault, asking when she is a lady, how can she say "my lady." He announces that other than Kalidasa no one can answer this puzzle. Bhoja rushes the guards to Kalaadhare's house, only to find the dead body of Kalidasa. Bhoja also learns the truth from Vidyadhare: Kalidasa was her husband. Bhoja pledges to Vidyadhare that he'll get her husband back to her and prays to the goddess Kali to donate his half life to Kalidasa. When Kalidasa awakens, Bhoja hides himself and tricks him to sing "charama geethe." Bhoja dies once his friend has completed the song.

The onus is now on Kalidasa to get his friend back to life; the only way is the divine intervention. He prays his heart out to the goddess Kali, who is touched by the love and affection Kalidasa and Bhoja bestow on each other. The goddess blesses both Kalidasa and Bhoja with long lives. The movie ends with Kalidasa reuniting with Vidyadhare.

== Cast ==
- Rajkumar as Kalidasa and Dushyantha
- Jayapradha as Vidhyadhare and Shakuntala
- Srinivasa Murthy as Raja Bhoja
- Balakrishna as Mantri Gunasaagara
- Nalini (credited as Anandi) as Goddess Kali
- K. Vijaya as Rathnakale
- Master Arjun as Sarvadamana/Bharata
- Thoogudeepa Srinivas as Mahakavi Rakshasa
- Musuri Krishnamurthy as Kavi Rakshasa
- Vadiraj as Mari Rakshasa
- Thimmaiah as Durvasa Muni
- Shani Mahadevappa, cameo appearance as Dindima kavi
- Papamma as Gouthami

== Soundtrack ==
The music for the film was composed by M. Ranga Rao and the lyrics of all the songs were written by Chi. Udaya Shankar ( except for Shyamala Dandaka written by Kalidasa which was used for Manikyaveena song). Rajkumar who was impressed by Mehdi Hassan's ghazal Nawazish Karam Shukriya, asked the music director to recreate the song which resulted in Sadaa Kannale. The movie also included a sequence where all the major works of Kalidasa are remembered.

Kaviratna Kalidasa

Soundtrack album by M. Ranga Rao
- Released: 1983
- Recorded: 1983
- Genre: Feature Film Soundtrack
- Language: Kannada
- Director: M. Ranga Rao

M. Ranga Rao chronology
Raja Maharaja (1982)	Kaviratna Kalidasa (1983)	Kalluveene Nudiyithu (1983)

No.	Title	Artist(s)	Length
1.	"Maanikyaveenam Upalalayanthim" (Lyrics: Kalidasa)	Dr. Rajkumar	7:32
2.	"Belli Mooditho"	Dr. Rajkumar	3:57
3.	"Sadaa Kannale"	Dr. Rajkumar, Vani Jairam	4:00
4.	"Alabyad Kane Sumkire"	Dr. Rajkumar	3:14
5.	"O Priyathama"	Dr. Rajkumar, Vani Jairam	6:07
Total length:			24:39
