= Poonam Sinha =

Indian actress, fashion model, and politician

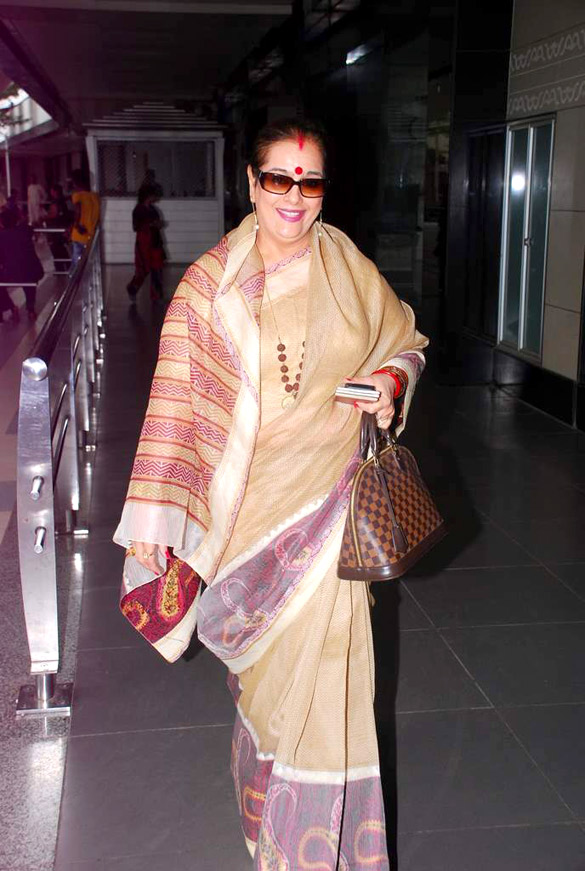
- Sinha in 2012
- Born: Poonam Chandiramani; 3 November 1949 (age 77); Hyderabad, India
- Other name: Komal
- Occupations: Actress; politician
- Political party: Samajwadi Party
- Spouse: Shatrughan Sinha (m. 1980)
- Children: 3, including Sonakshi Sinha and Luv Sinha

Poonam Sinha (née Chandiramani; born 3 November 1949) is an Indian politician and former actress, fashion model. She acted in Hindi cinema under the screen name Komal in her early career. She was crowned Miss Young India in 1968. She is married to actor and politician Shatrughna Sinha. She worked in lead roles in Hindi movies and has also produced two films.

== Early life ==
Poonam was born in Hyderabad, in a Sindhi family as Poonam Chandiramani. She later moved to Mumbai, where she pursued a career in modelling and films.

== Career ==
She was credited as Komal in all her films as heroine, including Jigri Dost, Dil Diwana and others. She was cast with Shatrughan Sinha in the movie Sabak (1973). The two later got married in 1980. They had earlier met in a train compartment while travelling.

After her marriage, she largely left her acting career to raise their children. After a long gap of thirty years, she starred in the film Jodhaa Akbar (2008) playing Mallika Hamida Banu Begum—mother of Emperor Akbar, enacted by Hrithik Roshan, directed by Ashutosh Gowariker.

=== Politics ===
On 16 April 2019, she joined the Samajwadi Party, while her husband Shatrughan Sinha joined Indian National Congress after resigning from BJP. She lost the Loksabha election to Rajnath Singh from Lucknow (Lok Sabha constituency).

== Personal life ==
She is married to actor-politician Shatrughan Sinha. They have twin sons, actors Luv Sinha and Kush Sinha, and a daughter, Bollywood actress Sonakshi Sinha. She lives with her husband and children in their Juhu bungalow, Ramayan.

Sonakshi had said she lives with her family due to her being a mommy/daddy's girl and that she has all the space she needs at her parents' house and that her apartment is more of a studio.

== Filmography ==
Year	Film	Role	Director(s)	Notes
1968	Jigri Dost	Komal	Ravikant Nagaich	
1969	Wapas		Satyen Bose	
1969	Aadmi Aur Insaan	Renu Mehra	Yash Chopra	
1970	Aag Aur Daag	Renu	A. Salaam	
1972	Joroo Ka Ghulam	Tina	A. Bhimsingh	
1973	Sabak	Poonam	Jugal Kishore	
1974	Shaitaan	Munish's Date	Firoz Chinoy	
1974	Dil Diwana	Sunita	Narendra Bedi	
1977	Dream Girl	Komal	Pramod Chakravorty	
1981	Prem Geet	N/A	Sudesh Issar	Associate Producer
2002	Mitr, My Friend	Relative	Revathi	
2006	Mera Dil Leke Dekho	N/A	Rohit Kaushik	Producer
2008	Jodhaa Akbar	Mallika Hamida Banu Begum	Ashutosh Gowariker	
