= Shaitaan (1974 film) =

- Directed by: Firoz Chinoy
- Written by: K.A. Narayan
- Screenplay by: Kaushal Bharati
- Story by: K.A. Narayan
- Produced by: A.A. Nadiadwala
- Starring: Shatrughan Sinha; Anil Dhawan; Sharmila Tagore; D.K. Sapru; Bindu; Aruna Irani; Jagdeep; Padma Khanna; Nivedita
- Music by: R. D. Burman
- Release date: 16 January 1974
- Country: India
- Language: Hindi

Shaitaan (transl. Devil/Satan) is a 1974 Hindi thriller film, directed by Firoze Chinoy starring Shatrughan Sinha and Sharmila Tagore in main roles. Majrooh Sultanpuri wrote the songs for this film while Rahul Dev Burman was the music director.

== Plot ==
Anand (Shatrughan Sinha) and Munish (Anil Dhawan) are two best friends. Anand is an honest police officer whereas Munish is the most famous lawyer of the city. Munish's sister Nisha is in love with Anand.

There are series of rapes and murders in the film. Anand discovers that all the victim girls were connected with Munish. One girl Shabnam, miraculously escapes from the hands of Munish. Anand arrests Munish on the charges of rape and murder but Shabnam identifies Anand as the killer and the rapist. The confusion arose because the actual killer is Anand's lookalike Ashok.

== Cast ==
- Shatrughan Sinha as Inspector Anand / Ashok (Double Role)
- Sharmila Tagore as Nisha (Special Appearance)
- Anil Dhawan as Advocate Munish
- Bindu as Sabrina
- Kumud Chuggani as Lily Fernandes (Air Hostess)
- Aruna Irani as Banjaran
- D.K. Sapru as Police Commissioner
- Tun Tun as Meena Advani
- Sulochana Latkar as Radha
- Padma Khanna as Shabnam
- Jagdeep as Maqtulla
- Komal as Munish's Date

== Soundtrack ==
Song	Singer
"Apna Samajhke Chali Aayi"	Lata Mangeshkar
"Meri Aankh Phadakti Hai"	Asha Bhosle
"Woh Jo Kal Gaye The"	Asha Bhosle
"Dil To Maane Na, Meri Jaan, Meri Jaan, Tan To Maane Na"	Asha Bhosle, R. D. Burman
