= Black Market (1967 film) =

- Directed by: S. N. Singh
- Written by: Mohini Productions (dialogues)
- Screenplay by: Mohini Productions
- Story by: Mohini Productions
- Produced by: S. N. Singh
- Starring: Dikki Madhava Rao; Narasimharaju; Sampath; Meese Muniyappa
- Cinematography: K. S. Govindaswamy
- Edited by: R. E. Chinnappa
- Music by: Satyam
- Production company: Mohini Productions
- Distributed by: Mohini Productions
- Release date: 1967
- Running time: 110 minutes
- Country: India
- Language: Kannada

Black Market is a 1967 Indian Kannada film, directed and produced by S. N. Singh. The film stars Dikki Madhava Rao, Narasimharaju, Sampath and Meese Muniyappa. The film has musical score by Satyam.

== Cast ==
- Dikki Madhava Rao
- Narasimharaju as Shyamsundar
- Sampath as Govind Rao
- Meese Muniyappa
- Vandana
- Sharada
- B. Kamalamma
- Baby Sujatha
- Musuri Krishnamurthy
- Chi Sadashivaiah
- Sampige Shankar
- Ramaraja Urs
- Gurumurthy
- Guruswamy
- Shivaram Nayak
- Master Jayaraj Singh
