= Paalige Bandadde Panchamrutha =

- Directed by: M. B. Ganesh Singh
- Produced by: K. Krishnaswamy
- Starring: Dikki Madhava Rao; Prathima Devi; Saraswathi
- Cinematography: K. S. Govinda Swamy
- Music by: A. R. K. Swamy
- Production company: Premier Studio
- Release date: 1963
- Country: India
- Language: Kannada

Paalige Bandadde Panchamrutha is a 1963 Indian Kannada film, directed by M. B. Ganesh Singh and produced by K. Krishnaswamy. The film stars Dikki Madhava Rao, Prathima Devi and Saraswathi in the lead roles. The film has musical score by A. R. K. Swamy.

== Cast ==
- Dikki Madhava Rao
- Prathima Devi
- Saraswathi
