= Shani Mahadevappa =

Indian Kannada actor (1933–2021)

- Mahadevappa as Dindima in Kaviratna Kalidasa (1983)
- Born: Mahadevappa; 19 March 1933; Belakavadi, Malavalli, Mandya, Kingdom of Mysore
- Died: 3 January 2021 (aged 87); Bengaluru, Karnataka, India
- Occupation: Actor
- Years active: 1962–2008
- Spouse: Jayamma
- Children: 2

Mahadevappa, known by his screen name Shani Mahadevappa (19 March 1933 – 3 January 2021), was an Indian actor who worked in Kannada cinema.

Having made his acting debut on stage in the 1950s, he became popular for his portrayal of deity Shani in Shanishwara Mahatme. His film career began with Sri Dharmasthala Mahathme (1962) and was known for his portrayal of supporting characters, notably the poet Dindima in Kaviratna Kalidasa (1983). He appeared in over 400 films.

== Biography ==
Shani Mahadevappa was born on 19 March 1933 in Belakavadi, a village in the present-day Mandya district of India's Karnataka State (in erstwhile Kingdom of Mysore). His father Kenchappa worked as a contactor while also staging and acting in plays in his village. Mahadevappa was drawn towards it as a youngster, but lack of a steady income led him to do menial jobs. He then joined Gubbi Veeranna's theatre company and later Kannada Theatres, another stage company, where he was paid ₹15 a month. His first gig as a stage actor came in the play Raja Vikrama, in which he played the role of deity Surya and then sage Vishvamitra in Satya Harischandra. However, it was his performance as Shani in Shanishwara Mahatme that received widespread recognition, also drawing crowds from nearby states. India's then Prime Minister Jawaharlal Nehru and President Sarvepalli Radhakrishnan were among those that watched the play.

Mahadevappa made his film acting debut with Sri Dharmasthala Mahathme (1962) in which he played deity Brahma. His second appearance came years later with Bhageerathi (1968). During the period, he played mostly supporting roles. In Bangalore Mail (1968), he played a CID officer. In Bhakta Kumbara (1974), he played the saint Jnanadeva. His other appearances include films starring Dr. Rajkumar such as Hasiru Thorana (1970), Bangaarada Manushya (1972), Daari Tappida Maga (1975) and Shankar Guru (1978) among others. Mahadevappa's portrayal of poet Dindima in Kaviratna Kalidasa (1983) was well received.

Mahadevappa died from complications of COVID-19 in Bengaluru on 3 January 2021, aged 88. He was survived by a son and daughter.

== Selected filmography ==
- Sri Dharmasthala Mahathme (1962)...Brahma
- Bhageerathi (1968)
- Bangalore Mail (1968)
- Hasiru Thorana (1970)
- Bangaarada Manushya (1972)...Chamaiah
- Daari Tappida Maga (1975)...Police Commissioner
- Thrimurthy (1975)...Rajaram's house servant
- Premada Kanike (1976)
- Shankar Guru (1978)
- Kaviratna Kalidasa (1983)...Dindima
- Chandi Chamundi (1983)...Mahadevappa
- Yarivanu (1984)
- Nee Thanda Kanike (1985)
- Ade Kannu (1985)
- Jwaalamukhi (1985)
- Nanna Prathigne (1985)...Somanna
- Madhuve Madu Tamashe Nodu (1986)
- Ee Jeeva Ninagagi (1986)
- Jeevana Jyothi (1987)
- Sathyam Shivam Sundaram (1987)
- Jayasimha (1987)
- Mathru Vathsalya (1988)
- Ranaranga (1988)
- Onti Salaga (1989)
- Gagana (1989)...Rangayya
- Ramarajyadalli Rakshasaru (1990)
- Shivashankar (1990)
- Mana Mecchida Sose (1992)
- Aathma Bandhana (1992)
- Saptapadi (1992)...bridegroom's father
- Aakasmika (1993)...Vaikuntaiah
- Bhagavan Sri Saibaba (1993)...Mallesha
- Odahuttidavaru (1994)...Dharma
- Jipuna Nanna Ganda (2001)
- Love Passagali (2003)...Shani Mahadevappa

== Awards ==
- Varadaraju Award 2009
- Rajkumar Souharda Award

== See also ==
- List of people from Karnataka
- Cinema of Karnataka
