= Raja Satyavrata =

- Directed by: D. Shankar Singh
- Produced by: N. Bhakta Vatsalan
- Starring: Udaykumar; T. N. Balakrishna; Dikki Madhava Rao; Prathima Devi
- Cinematography: S. K. Varada Rajan
- Music by: M. Venkataraju
- Production company: Parijatha Films
- Release date: 1961
- Country: India
- Language: Kannada

Raja Satyavrata is a 1961 Indian Kannada film, directed by D. Shankar Singh and produced by N. Bhakta Vatsalan. The film stars Udaykumar, T. N. Balakrishna, Dikki Madhava Rao and Prathima Devi in the lead roles. The film has musical score by M. Venkataraju.

== Cast ==
- Udaykumar
- T. N. Balakrishna
- Dikki Madhava Rao
- Prathima Devi
