= Belakavadi =

- Village
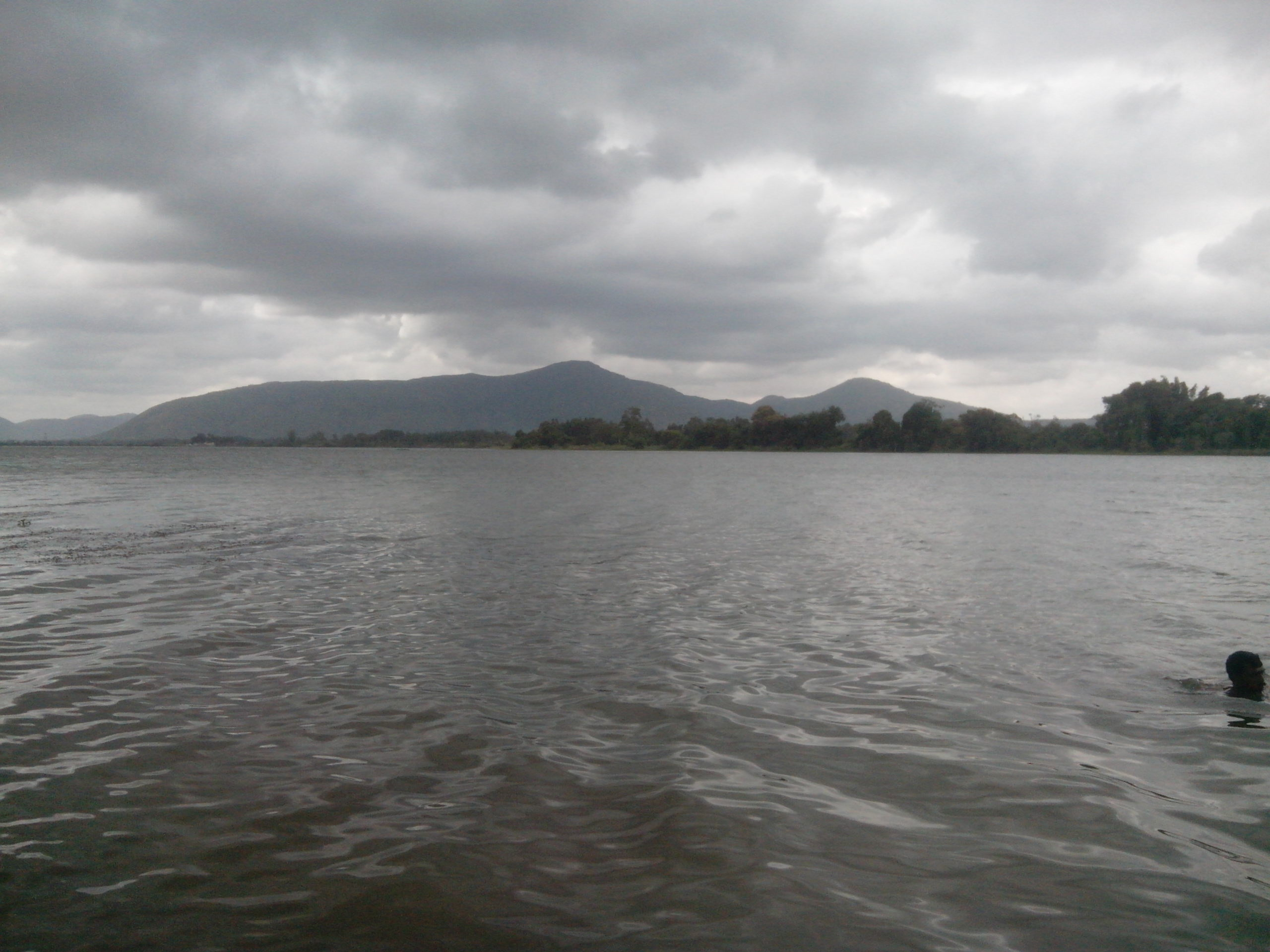
- Nickname: Belakodi
- Location in Karnataka, India Belakavadi (India)
- Coordinates: 12°15′18″N 77°7′21″E
- Country: India
- State: Karnataka
- District: Mandya
- Taluk: Malavalli

Government
  - Type: Village Panchayat
  - Body: Belakavadi Gram Panchayat

Population (2001)
  - Total: 9,851

Languages
  - Official: Kannada
- Time zone: UTC+5:30 (IST)
- PIN: 571417
- Vehicle registration: KA-11

Belakavadi or Belakawadi is a village in the southern state of Karnataka, India. It is located in the Malavalli taluk of Mandya district in Karnataka. As per the records of Hoysala rulers, Belakavadi was one of the central places of administrative divisions. Its temples include Shanbhulingeshwara Temple, Kashi Vishwanatheshwara Temple and maramma temple, Mayamma temple, Mandalakamma temple etc.

== Demographics ==
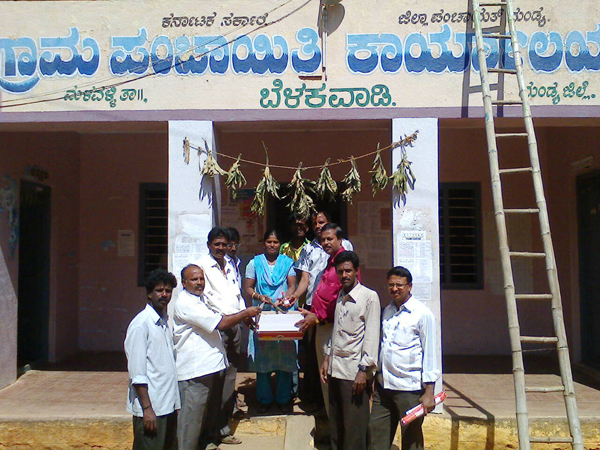
The office of the Gram Panchayat, Belakavadi

As of 2001 India census, Belakavadi had a population of 9851 with 4888 males and 4963 females. Majority of the population belong to Hinduism.

== History ==
Belakavadi is on the left bank of the river Kaveri situated 20 km southwest of the taluk centre Malavalli. Plenty of red, black, black red and coloured pottery as well as Rousette coated potteries of the Megalithic age were discovered in a site on the banks of the river. On some of them are traces of decorations. In a ruined pit, animal bones were found. The 1945-46 report of the department of Archaeology refers to it, probably as a mud burial. All the six inscriptions reported from this place are of the Vijayanagar period and registers the grant given to the Shambhulinga temple. The Ishwara temple on the river bank, is a structure of about 15th century and the Veerabhadra temple in the centre street of the village is of about 14th century. There are other temples such as Kattebasappa, Upparige Basaveshwara and Mandalakamma, It also has more than seven hero stones and several Masti stones.

== Notable people ==
- Shani Mahadevappa - Kannada theatre and film actor
- Roopa Iyer - film actress, director

== Transport ==
The village is well connected by roads. KSRTC (Karnataka State Road Transport Corporation) ply buses from Bengaluru, Mysuru, Malavalli, Kollegala and T.Narasipura.

== See also ==
- Mandya
- Districts of Karnataka
