= Chandra Kumara =

- Directed by: N. S. Varma
- Written by: T. Madar; Sanjeevani
- Produced by: T. Madar
- Starring: Rajkumar; Udaykumar; Rajashankar; Narasimharaju
- Cinematography: N. S. Varma
- Edited by: P. S. Murthy
- Music by: T. Chalapathi Rao; M. Venkataraju
- Production company: H M Baba Productions
- Distributed by: H M Baba Productions
- Release date: 27 September 1963
- Country: India
- Language: Kannada

Chandra Kumara is a 1963 Indian Kannada-language film directed by N. S. Varma and produced by T Madar. The film stars Rajkumar, Udaykumar, Rajashankar and Narasimharaju. The musical score was composed by T. Chalapathi Rao and M. Venkataraju.

== Plot ==
The plot centers around a man who faces numerous challenges in his life and learns the hard way that neither fate nor destiny can be changed by human efforts. Udaykumar played the titular character Chandrakumara, while Rajkumar portrays his father in law Prachanda. Krishnakumari played the role of Rajkumar's daughter. This is the only film in which Rajkumar played the role of father in law to Udaykumar.

== Cast ==
- Rajkumar as Brahmachari
- Udaykumar as Chandra Kumara
- Krishnakumari as Chandrika, Chandra Kumara's love interest
- Rajashankar as Vidyadhara or Veera Nayaka
- Narasimharaju as Vinodha
- Balakrishna as Timba
- Ganapathi Bhat as Gulaganji
- M Jayashree as Aparanji
- Rajasree as Prabhamani
- B. Jayashree
- Sheshkumari
- B. Jaya as Putnanji
- Eshwarappa
- Hanumantha Rao
- Kupparaj as Chithrasena
- Rajendra Krishna
- Jagadish
