= M. Venkataraju =

Indian music director and composer

- Born: Mandapati Venkataraju; 31 March 1916
- Died: 1969
- Occupation: Music director
- Mother: Rangamma
- Relatives: M. Ranga Rao (Brother)

M. Venkataraju (1916-1969) was a music director/composer who worked in Kannada cinema.

== Filmography ==
List of films

- Bhakta Kanakadasa (1960)
- Raja Satyavrata (1961)
- Swarna Gowri (1962)
- Thejaswini (1962)
- Sri Dharmasthala Mahathme (1962)
- Nanda Deepa (1963)
- Jeevana Tharanga (1963)
- Chandra Kumara (in association with T.Chalapathi Rao) (1963)
