= Bangalore Mail =

- Directed by: L. S. Narayana
- Produced by: Y. V. Rao
- Starring: Rajkumar; Narasimharaju; Jayanthi
- Cinematography: R. Madhu
- Edited by: Bal G. Yadav
- Music by: Satyam
- Production company: Gowri Art Films
- Distributed by: Eshwari Pictures
- Release date: 1968
- Running time: 151 minutes
- Country: India
- Language: Kannada

Bangalore Mail is a 1968 Indian Kannada-language mystery thriller film directed by L. S. Narayana and produced by Y. V. Rao. The film stars Rajkumar, Narasimharaju and Jayanthi. The film had musical score by Satyam . The movie is a remake of the 1967 Malayalam movie Cochin Express, which was also subsequently remade in Telugu as Circar Express (1968), in Tamil as Neelagiri Express (1968) and in Hindi as The Train (1970).

Malayalam actor Kottarakkara Sreedharan Nair appeared in the role of a gangster in his only Kannada movie appearance. Director S. K. Bhagavan played the role of antagonist in the movie. This is one of the few movies where credits to Chi. Udayashankar appear first before crediting the lead roles of the movie. Rajkumar makes an entry after nearly half an hour into the movie.

== Cast ==
- Dr. Rajkumar as Shyamsundar
- Narasimharaju as Babu Rajendra Prasad Venkata Girija Ramana
- S. K. Bhagawan as room service attendant
- Kottarakkara Sreedharan Nair as a gangster
- Vijayarao
- Comedian Guggu
- Jayanthi
- B. V. Radha
- Jyothi Lakshmi
- Vijayalalitha
- K. S. Ashwath in a guest appearance
- Shyam Sundar
- Kuppuraj
- Srikanth
- Narayan
- B. S. Raju
- Shani Mahadevappa
- Anilkumar
- L. S. Swamy
- Yashoda
- Shyamala
- Shanthamma
- Dhanashree
- Vijayasree
- Venkateshaiah Mandya (uncredited)

== Soundtrack ==
Bangalore Mail

Soundtrack album by Satyam
- Released: 1968
- Genre: Feature film soundtrack
- Length: 22:03
- Label: Saregama

The music of the film was composed by Satyam, with lyrics by Chi. Udaya Shankar. The album consists of six tracks.

Track list
No.	Title	Lyrics	Singer(s)	Length
1.	"Kannugale Kamalagalu"	Chi. Udaya Shankar	P. B. Sreenivas, S. Janaki	3:29
2.	"Ore Nota"	Chi. Udaya Shankar	L. R. Eswari	3:27
3.	"Pony Tailu Nodu Nodu"	Chi. Udaya Shankar	S. P. Balasubrahmanyam, L. R. Eswari	4:33
4.	"Bangara Balayuna"	Chi. Udaya Shankar	S. Janaki, B. K. Sumitra	2:55
5.	"Are Jaa Jaa"	Chi. Udaya Shankar	S. Janaki	4:11
6.	"Kuhusiri Cha Cha"	Chi. Udaya Shankar	L. R. Eswari, chorus	3:28
Total length:				22:03
