= Emme Thammanna =

1966 film by B. R. Panthulu

- Poster
- Directed by: B. R. Panthulu
- Screenplay by: Padmini Pictures Sahithya Vibhaga
- Story by: A. K. Velan
- Produced by: B. R. Panthulu
- Starring: Rajkumar; Dikki Madhava Rao; Bharathi
- Cinematography: P. L. Nagappa
- Edited by: R. Devarajan
- Music by: T. G. Lingappa
- Production company: Padmini Pictures
- Release date: 1966
- Running time: 146 minutes
- Country: India
- Language: Kannada

Emme Thammanna is a 1966 Indian Kannada-language film produced and directed by B. R. Panthulu. It stars Rajkumar, Dikki Madhava Rao, Bharathi Vishnuvardhan. The supporting cast features Narasimharaju, Subbanna, Krishna Shastry, B. R. Panthulu, Papamma, Jaya and M. V. Rajamma. The film was remade in Telugu as Govula Gopanna (1968), in Hindi as Jigri Dost (1969) and in Tamil as Mattukara Velan (1970). This was the first social drama movie of Rajkumar where he played dual roles in a full-fledged manner excluding Malli Maduve where his second character appears only for three seconds. The core plot was loosely based on a Marathi play.

== Plot ==
Thammanna, a cattleman, and Murali, a lawyer, are identical. Confusion arises when Thammanna falls in love with a rich and educated woman Meena, also a daughter of a lawyer, who mistakes him for Murali.

== Cast ==
- Rajkumar as "Emme" Thammanna / Murali
- Bharathi Vishnuvardhan as Meena
- G. V. Lathadevi as Radha
- Dikki Madhava Rao as Seshanna
- B. R. Panthulu as Narasimhaiah
- Narasimharaju as Kasturi
- Makeup Subbanna
- H. R. Shastry
- Papamma
- B. Jaya
- M. V. Rajamma as Kaveri, Narasimhaiah's wife
- M. Jayashree
- Narayan
- Bhavani Shankar
- Basappa
- Lakshmayya
- Nanjappa

== Soundtrack ==
T. G. Lingappa composed the soundtrack, and lyrics were written by G. V. Iyer.

Track listing
No.	Title	Singer(s)	Length
1.	"Neenaarigadayo Ele Manava"	P. B. Sreenivas, Bangalore Latha	2:53
2.	"Belli Hakki Aguva"	P. B. Sreenivas, S. Janaki	3:42
3.	"Kanneradu Kareyuthide"	P. B. Sreenivas, Bangalore Lata, S. Janaki	3:19
4.	"Kolalanoodhi Kuniva"	P. B. Sreenivas, Bangalore Lata	4:37
5.	"Emme Ella Ellanna"	S. Janaki	3:18
6.	"Kaththarisu Kaththarisu"	Pendyala Nageswara Rao	2:30
7.	"Ninnayalla Thammanna"	S. Janaki	3:30
Total length:			23:39
