= Govula Gopanna =

- Theatrical release poster
- Directed by: C. S. Rao
- Written by: Bhamidipati Radhakrishna (dialogues)
- Screenplay by: C. S. Rao
- Story by: A. K. Velan
- Based on: Emme Thammanna (1966)
- Produced by: Lakshmi Rajyam; Sridhar Rao; Sundarlal Nehata (Presents)
- Starring: Akkineni Nageswara Rao; Rajasree; Bharathi
- Cinematography: Kamal Ghosh
- Edited by: S. P. S. Veerappa
- Music by: Ghantasala
- Production company: Rajyam Productions
- Release date: 19 April 1968
- Running time: 160 minutes
- Country: India
- Language: Telugu

Govula Gopanna is a 1968 Indian Telugu-language comedy drama film, produced by Lakshmi Rajyam and Sridhar Rao and directed by C. S. Rao. The film stars Akkineni Nageswara Rao, Rajasree and Bharathi, with music composed by Ghantasala. It is a remake of the 1966 Kannada film Emme Thammanna.

== Cast ==
- Akkineni Nageswara Rao as Gopanna and Chandrasekhar
- Rajasree as Tara
- Bharathi as Radha
- Relangi as Pleader Narasimham
- Gummadi as Chairman Nagaraju
- Chalam as Kasthuri
- Suryakantham as Mahalakshmi
- Lakshmirajyam as Shanthamma
- Sukanya as Raji / Rajeswari
- Vangara as Subbaiah

== Soundtrack ==
Music composed by Ghantasala.

Song title	Lyrics	Singers	length
"Hello Mr. Govula Gopanna"	Kosaraju	S. Janaki	4:15
"Ee Virithotala"	Sri Sri	Ghantasala, P. Susheela, Raghavulu, Bangalore Latha	3:34
"Akasamlo"	Dasaradhi	Ghantasala, P. Susheela	3:40
"Kannela Valapula"	Aarudhra	Ghantasala, P. Susheela	5:29
"Vinara Vinara"	Kosaraju	Ghantasala	3:59
"Dum Dum Dry Cleaning"	Dasaradhi	Ghantasala, Bangalore Latha	3:06
"Hadapettakoi Bava"	Kosaraju	S. Janaki	3:52
"Vinara Vinara"	Kosaraju	Ghantasala, P. Susheela	2:23
