= Mattukkara Velan =

1970 film by P. Neelakantan

Maattukkara Velan
- Theatrical release poster
- Directed by: P. Neelakantan
- Screenplay by: A. L. Narayanan
- Based on: Emme Thammanna by A. K. Velan
- Produced by: N. Kanagasabai
- Starring: M. G. Ramachandran; Jayalalithaa; Lakshmi
- Cinematography: V. Ramamoorthy
- Edited by: K. Narayanan
- Music by: K. V. Mahadevan
- Production company: Jayanthi Films
- Release date: 14 January 1970
- Running time: 173 minutes
- Country: India
- Language: Tamil

Maattukkara Velan (transl. Velan, the cowherd) is a 1970 Indian Tamil-language action drama film directed by Pa. Neelakandhan. It is a remake of the 1966 Kannada film Emme Thammanna. The film stars M. G. Ramachandran, Jayalalithaa and Lakshmi, with S. A. Ashokan as the villain. It was released on 14 January 1970 and ran for 175 days.

== Cast ==
- M. G. Ramachandran as Velan and Raghu
- Jayalalithaa as Radha, daughter of Sattanathan
- Lakshmi as Kamala,daughter of Nagalingam
- S. A. Ashokan as Nagalingam
- V. K. Ramasamy as Sattanathan
- Cho Ramaswamy as Sundaram, son of Nagalingam
- C. R. Parthiban as Sokka, Dupe Police – a syndicate of the Chairman Nagalingam
- S. Varalakshmi as Annapurna, Advocate R. K. Sattanadhan's wife
- Sachu as Kaveri
- Karikol Raju as Victim of Nagalingam
- Usilai Mani as Sattanathan's client
- S. N. Lakshmi as Raghunath Sabhapathi's mother

== Soundtrack ==
The music was composed by K. V. Mahadevan and the lyrics were written by Kannadasan and Vaali.

| Song | Singers | Length |
|---|---|---|
| "Sathiyam Neeye" | T. M. Soundararajan | 04:15 |
| "Oru Pakkam Parkkiral" | T. M. Soundararajan, L. R. Eswari | 03:40 |
| "Poo Vaitha" | T. M. Soundararajan, P. Susheela, L. R. Eswari | 04:13 |
| "Thottu Kollava" | T. M. Soundararajan, P. Susheela | 03:05 |
| "Pattikada Pattanamma" | T. M. Soundararajan, L. R. Eswari | 05:24 |
