= Swarna Gowri =

- DVD Cover
- Directed by: Y. R. Swamy
- Written by: S. K. Karim Khan
- Screenplay by: Y. R. Swamy; Vituri; Prakash Rao
- Produced by: D. R. Naidu
- Starring: Rajkumar; Krishna Kumari; Udaykumar; Rajasree; Narasimharaju
- Cinematography: R. Madhu
- Edited by: S. P. N. Krishna; G. Bhoja Rao
- Music by: M. Venkataraju
- Production company: Shyam Prasad Movies
- Distributed by: Shyam Prasad Movies
- Release date: 28 April 1962
- Country: India
- Language: Kannada

Swarna Gowri is a 1962 Indian Kannada-language film, directed by Y. R. Swamy and produced by D. R. Naidu. The film stars Rajkumar, Krishna Kumari, Udaykumar and Narasimharaju. The film has musical score by M. Venkataraju. The movie was simultaneously shot in Telugu with the same name by the same producer and director with Kanta Rao and Krishna Kumari in the lead roles.

== Cast ==
- Rajkumar as Kaalinga/Chandra
- Krishna Kumari as Gowri
- Udaykumar as Maharaja
- Narasimharaju as Ganapati
- K. S. Ashwath as Narada
- Sathyanarayana as Lord Shiva
- H. R. Shastry as Shambudasa
- Sandhya as Goddess Partvati
- Rajasree as Malini
- M. N. Lakshmi Devi as Gomathi
- Ramadevi as Chandi
- M. Jayashree as Maharani
- Vadiraj as Giri
- Ganapathi Bhat
- Sorat Ashwath
- Kashinath
- Lakshmayya Choudhury
- Jagga Rao
- Sheshagiri Rao
- Devaki
- Praveena
- Papamma in cameo appearance
- Baby Sarvamangala

== Soundtrack ==
The music was composed by M. Venkataraju.

No.	Song	Singers	Lyrics	Length (m:ss)
1	"Baara Chanramaa"	P. B. Sreenivas, S. Janaki	S. K. Karim Khan	03:08
2	"Haadelenu Manadaase"	S. Janaki	S. K. Karim Khan	03:20
3	"Laali Laali Bala Mukunda"	P. Leela	S. K. Karim Khan	03:28
4	"Leela Vilaasa"	S. Janaki	S. K. Karim Khan	03:12
5	"Nudimana Shivaguna"	P. B. Srinivas, P. Susheela	S. K. Karim Khan	03:11
6	"Belagisoo"	P. Susheela	S. K. Karim Khan	06:02
7	"Kannada Naadinaa"	P. Nageswara Rao	S. K. Karim Khan	03:29
8	"Neethiya Meresi"	P. Susheela	S. K. Karim Khan	03:05
9	"Thai Thai Thai Ennuva"	L. R. Eswari	S. K. Karim Khan	03:24
10	"Bare Nee Eheluve"	P. B. Srinivas	S. K. Karim Khan	03:17
11	"Beeso Gaali Ale"	P. B. Srinivas, S. Janaki	S. K. Karim Khan	03:37
12	"Jaya Gowri Jagadeeshwari"	S. Janaki, Chittaranjan	S. K. Karim Khan	03:02
13	"Natavara Gangaadhara Umashankara"	M. Balamuralikrishna	S. K. Karim Khan	03:16
