= Sri Dharmasthala Mahathme =

- Directed by: D. Shankar Singh
- Written by: Hunsur Krishnamurthy; P. Gundu Rao; H. L. Narayana Rao
- Produced by: D. Shankar Singh
- Starring: H. T. Urs; Dikki Madhava Rao; Shamarao; H. R. Shastry
- Cinematography: K. S. Govindaswamy
- Edited by: K. V. Padmanabhan; G. V. Raman
- Music by: M. Venkataraju
- Production company: Mahathma Pictures
- Distributed by: Mahathma Pictures
- Release date: 13 July 1962
- Running time: 125 min
- Country: India
- Language: Kannada

Sri Dharmasthala Mahathme is a 1962 Indian Kannada Hindu mythological drama film directed and produced by D. Shankar Singh. The film stars H. T. Urs, Dikki Madhava Rao, Shamarao and H. R. Shastry in the lead roles. The film has musical score by M. Venkataraju.

== Cast ==
- H. T. Urs
- Dikki Madhava Rao
- Shamarao
- H. R. Shastry
- Sorat Ashwath
- Krishna Shastry
- Shivashankar
- D. N. Wadeyar
- Sriranga
- Srikanth
- M. Ramarao
- Shani Mahadevappa
- Mallikarjunappa
- Venkatappa
- Venkataramaiah
- Sham Singh
- Rajendra Prasad
- H. R. Hanumantha Rao
- Jorge
- Anantharam Maccheri
- Ankappa
- Nanjundappa
- Prathima Devi
- Indira Acharya
- C. K. Kalavathi
- Chandthara
- Jayanthi
- Kalyani
