= Jeevana Tharanga =

- Directed by: G. Bangar Raj
- Written by: G. Bangar Raj
- Screenplay by: G. Bangar Raj
- Produced by: D. RamaNaidu
- Starring: Rajkumar; Rajashankar; D. R. Naidu; K. S. Ashwath
- Cinematography: S. V. Srikanth
- Edited by: S. P. N. Krishna; T. P. Velayudham
- Music by: M. Venkataraju
- Production company: Shyam Prasad Movies
- Distributed by: Shyam Prasad Movies
- Release date: 27 April 1963
- Running time: 136 minutes
- Country: India
- Language: Kannada

Jeevana Tharanga is a 1963 Indian Kannada-language film, directed by G. Bangar Raj and produced by D. Rama Naidu. The film stars Rajkumar, Rajashankar, D. R. Naidu and K. S. Ashwath. The film has musical score by M. Venkataraju.

== Cast ==
- Rajkumar as Kumar
- Raja Shankar
- D. R. Naidu
- K. S. Ashwath
- Dikki Madhava Rao
- Balakrishna
- Subbanna
- Narasimharaju
- B. Hanumanthachar
- Leelavathi
- Advani Lakshmi Devi
- M. Jayashree
- Ramadevi
- Jr Revathi
- Leela Jayavanthi
- Chandrakala (credited as Kumari Chandrakala)
- Chithradevi
- Rajani
