= Thejaswini =

- Directed by: H. L. N. Simha
- Written by: Govinda Murthy Desai
- Screenplay by: H. L. N. Simha
- Based on: Holathi Kote by Govind Murthy Desai
- Produced by: M Pandaribai
- Starring: Rajkumar; Pandari Bai; Rajashankar; Rajasree
- Cinematography: R Sampath; B Dorairaj
- Edited by: P R Sabastiyan
- Music by: M. Venkataraju
- Production company: Sri Panduranga Productions
- Distributed by: Sri Panduranga Productions
- Release date: 21 December 1962
- Country: India
- Language: Kannada

Thejaswini is a 1962 Indian Kannada-language film, directed by H. L. N. Simha and produced by Pandari Bai. The film stars Rajkumar, Pandari Bai, Rajashankar and Rajasree. The film had musical score by M. Venkataraju. The movie is based on the short story Holathi Kote by Govinda Murthy Desai which was published in the monthly magazine Karmaveera.

== Cast ==
- Rajkumar
- Pandari Bai
- Rajashankar
- Rajasree
- Narasimharaju
- M. N. Lakshmidevi
- Ramachandra Shastry
- Chindodi Leela
- Hanumanthachar
- Adavani Lakshmidevi
- Ganapathi Bhat
- B. Ramadevi
- Suryakumar
- Papamma
- H. A. Narasimhan
- Nagarathnamma
- Maheshwaraiah
- Sharadamma
- Dikki Madhavarao in Guest appearance
- T. N. Balakrishna in Guest appearance
- K. S. Ashwath in Guest appearance
- S. N. Lakshmi in Guest appearance
