= Ajjihalli =

Ajjihalli may refer to:

- Ajjihalli, Davanagere, a village in the state of Karnataka, India
- Ajjihalli, Uttara Kannada, a village in the state of Karnataka, India
