= Eastmancolor =

Trade name and color process for film

Eastmancolor is a trade name used by Eastman Kodak for a number of related film and processing technologies associated with color motion picture production and referring to George Eastman, founder of Kodak.

Eastmancolor, introduced in 1950, was one of the first widely successful "single-strip color" processes, and eventually displaced the more cumbersome Technicolor. Eastmancolor was known by a variety of names, such as DeLuxe Color, Warnercolor, Metrocolor, Pathécolor, Columbiacolor, and others.

For more information on Eastmancolor, see

- Color motion picture film, for background on Eastmancolor and other motion picture processes in general
- Eastman Kodak Fine Grain color negative films (1950 onwards), within the "List of motion picture film stocks" article

== Eastman Color Negative ==
Eastman Color Negative (ECN) is a photographic processing system created by Kodak in the 1950s for the development of monopack color negative motion picture film stock. It is part of the Eastmancolor family of products sold by Eastman Kodak.

The original process, known as ECN-1, was used from the mid to late-1950s to the early to mid-1970s, and involved development at approximately 25 °C for around 7–9 minutes. Later research enabled faster development and more environmentally friendly film and process (and thus quicker photo lab turnaround time).

This process allowed a higher development temperature of 41.1 °C for around three minutes. This new environmentally friendly development process is known as ECN-2. It is the standard development process for all modern motion picture color negative developing, including Fujifilm and other non-Kodak film manufacturers. All film stocks are specifically created for a particular development process, thus ECN-1 film could not be put into an ECN-2 development bath since the designs are incompatible.

The ECN-2 process has normally been reserved for high volume labs involving hundreds or thousands of feet of film in a linear processor. With companies like QWD that have made this available in a kit form for home use, this process now can be done on a small scale.

Although respooled cinema film is able to be processed in standard C-41 chemistry with good results, an extra step for removing the remjet layer is required. Therefore, few labs are willing to process it, since it can accumulate on processing machines (or the film itself) and cause damage. Certain respoolers such as Cinestill remove the remjet before loading into the canisters, and thus can be processed on C-41 without film or machine damage concerns. New AHU coatings do a similarly good job at preventing halations, without the extra processing steps.

== Eastman Color Positive ==
Eastman Color Positive (ECP) is a photographic processing system created by Kodak in the 1950s for the development of monopack color positive print for direct projection motion picture film stock. It is part of the Eastmancolor family of products sold by Kodak.

ECP is not used for positive intermediate films because these are "pre-print" elements (e.g. archival or "protection" elements) and are never used for direct projection. One essential difference is the presence of an orange "mask" (i.e., effectively an orange base) on all films processed by Eastman Color Negative, and no "mask" (i.e., effectively a clear base) on all films processed by ECP.

The original process, known as ECP-1, was used from the 1950s to the mid-1970s, and involved development at approximately 25°C for around 7–9 minutes. Later research enabled faster development and more environmentally friendly film and process (and thus quicker photo lab turnaround time).

This process allowed a higher development temperature of 36.7°C for around three minutes. This new environmentally friendly development process is known as ECP-2. It is the standard development process for all modern motion picture color print developing, including Fuji and other non-Kodak film manufacturers. All film stocks are specifically created for a particular development process, thus ECP-1 film could not be put into an ECP-2 development bath since the designs are incompatible.

Originally, all Eastman Color films, ECN and ECP alike, were on triacetate base (no Eastman Color films were ever made on nitrate base), but recent practice has been for ECN elements to be on triacetate base, so these may be easily spliceable (using lap-type cemented splices, also called "negative assembly" splices), and for ECP elements to be on polyester base, so these are not spliceable (except by using butt-type splices with polyester splicing tapes).

== Examples of films that use Eastmancolor ==
- Royal Journey - (Canada) 1951
- Carson City - (Warnercolor) 1952
- Jigokumon - (Japan) 1953
- The High and the Mighty - (Warnercolor) 1954
- Valley of the Kings - 1954
- East of Eden (Warnercolor) - 1955
- Oklahoma! - 1955
- Rebel Without a Cause (Warnercolor) - 1955
- Foreign Intrigue 1956
- The Bolshoi Ballet - 1957
- Bayanihan - Filipino - 1959
- The Mouse That Roared (1959)
- Peeping Tom - British - 1960
- The Guns of Navarone - British (Eastmancolor by Pathe) - 1961
- Kandam Becha Kottu - Malayalam - 1961
- The Human Pyramid - France/Ivory Coast 1961
- Mere Mehboob - -Urdu (India) - 1963
- Good Neighbor Sam -- 1964
- Amara Shilpi Jakkanna - Telugu - 1964
- Kathalikka Neramillai - Tamil - 1964
- Karnan - Tamil 1964
- Padagotti - Tamil - 1964
- Amarashilpi Jakanachari - Kannada - 1964
- The Umbrellas of Cherbourg - French, 1964
- Thene Manasulu - Telugu - 1965
- Chemmeen - Malayalam - 1965
- Thiruvilaiyadal - Tamil - 1965
- Aayirathil Oruvan - Tamil - 1965
- Enga Veetu Pillai - Tamil - 1965
- Idhaya kamalam - Tamil - 1965
- Le Bonheur - French, 1965
- Help! - British, 1965
- Anbe Vaa - Tamil 1966
- Teorema - Italian, 1968
- 2001: A Space Odyssey - American/British, 1968 (Color credited as "Metrocolor")
- Macunaíma - Brazilian, 1969
- A Clockwork Orange - British/American, 1971 (Color credited as "Warnercolor")
- Piya Ka Ghar - Hindi, 1971
- Bangaarada Manushya - Kannada, 1972
- To Fly! - United States, 1976 (Eastman Color Negative)
- The NeverEnding Story - German/American, 1984
- Women on the Verge of a Nervous Breakdown - Spanish, 1988
- Jurassic Park - American, 1993
- Lapitch the Little Shoemaker - Croatian, 1997
