= Adibettahalli =

Coordinates: 12°08′N 76°55′E

- village
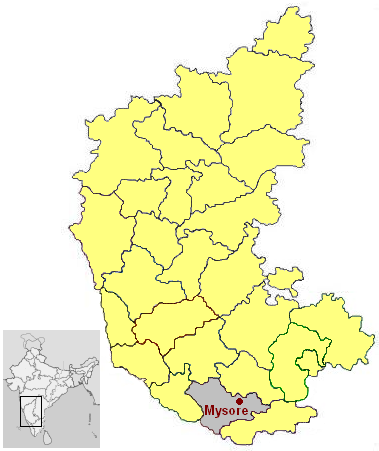
- Adibettahalli is in Mysore district
- Interactive map of Adibettahalli
- Country: India
- State: Karnataka
- District: Mysore
- Talukas: Tirumakudal Narsipur

Government
  - Body: Village Panchayat

Languages
  - Official: Kannada
- Time zone: UTC+5:30 (IST)
- ISO 3166 code: IN-KA
- Vehicle registration: KA
- Nearest city: Mysore
- Civic agency: Village Panchayat
- Website: karnataka.gov.in

Adibettahalli is a village in the southern state of Karnataka, India. It is located in the Tirumakudal Narsipur taluk of Mysore district in Karnataka.

== See also ==
- Mysore
- Districts of Karnataka
