= Amarasilpi Jakkanna =

- Theatrical release poster
- Directed by: B. S. Ranga
- Written by: Samudrala (dialogues)
- Screenplay by: B. S. Ranga
- Produced by: B. S. Ranga
- Starring: Akkineni Nageswara Rao; B. Saroja Devi
- Cinematography: B. S. Ranga
- Edited by: P. J. Mohan; M. Devendra Nath; Chakrapani
- Music by: S. Rajeswara Rao
- Production company: Vikram Studios
- Distributed by: Navayuga Films
- Release date: 27 March 1964
- Running time: 165 mins
- Country: India
- Language: Telugu

Amarasilpi Jakkanna is an Indian 1964 Telugu-language biographical film directed and produced by B. S. Ranga. The film stars Akkineni Nageswara Rao in the title role of Jakanachari, a legendary sculptor from the Hoysala period, whose dedication to art and personal sacrifices form the core of the narrative. The film also features B. Saroja Devi, V. Nagayya, and Udaya Kumar in key roles, with music composed by S. Rajeswara Rao.

Released on March 27, 1964, Amarasilpi Jakkanna was the first Telugu film shot in Eastmancolor and received critical acclaim, including a Presidential Certificate of Merit. Simultaneously, B. S. Ranga directed a Kannada version, Amarashilpi Jakanachari, which became the first full-length colour film in Kannada.

== Plot ==
Jakkanna, the son of master sculptor Mallanna, inherits the family’s legacy of sculpting. His life changes when he falls in love with Manjari, an exceptional dancer who becomes his muse. Inspired by her grace and beauty, Jakkanna creates breathtaking sculptures. However, Gopadevudu, a feudal lord, becomes infatuated with Manjari and devises plans to separate her from Jakkanna.

With the help of her uncle Sundaram and his fiancée Gangamma, Manjari marries Jakkanna. Enraged, Gopadevudu schemes against the couple, appointing Jakkanna to oversee the construction of the Vasanta Mantapa. Jakkanna pours his soul into the work, immortalizing Manjari’s beauty in the sculptures. Gopadevudu, intent on claiming Manjari, destroys one of Jakkanna’s sculptures, sends him away in search of new stones, and forcibly separates the couple. He manipulates Manjari into performing a forced dance under duress, exploiting her mother’s plight.

Heartbroken by these events, Jakkanna misunderstands Manjari's circumstances and leaves the village. In despair, Manjari attempts to drown herself but is rescued by boatmen and taken to an ashram. There, she gives birth to their son, Dankanna. Seeking Jakkanna, Manjari entrusts Dankanna to Mallanna, unaware that he is her father-in-law. Meanwhile, Jakkanna finds refuge under the guidance of the sage Ramanujacharya.

Ramanujacharya assigns Jakkanna the task of constructing the Chennakesava Temple at Belur for King Vishnuvardhana. Unknown to Jakkanna, Manjari joins the temple project and secretly assists him in sculpting. Dankanna grows up under Mallanna’s guidance and becomes a skilled sculptor. When he reaches Belur, he impresses the court by identifying flaws in a sculpture crafted by Jakkanna. Overcome with guilt, Jakkanna cuts off his own hand in penance but later sculpts another statue and miraculously regains his hand through divine intervention.

The narrative concludes with the emotional reunion of Mallanna, Jakkanna, Manjari, and Dankanna, bringing the family together after years of separation.

== Cast ==
- Akkineni Nageswara Rao as Jakanachari
- B. Saroja Devi as Manjari
- V. Nagayya as Mallanna
- Haranath as Dankanna
- Udaya Kumar as Gopadeva
- Dhulipala as Ramanujacharya
- Relangi as Sundaram
- A. V. Subba Rao as King Vishnuvardhana
- Suryakantham as Rajamma
- Girija as Gangamma
- Pushpavalli as Queen Saanthalaa Devi
- Jayalalitha as Dancer

== Production ==
B. S. Ranga drew inspiration for the film from his childhood visits to the Hoysala temples at Halebidu and Belur. The sculptural heritage of these temples, particularly the 42 Madanikas (celestial dancers) sculpted at the Chennakesava Temple, forms the backdrop for Jakkanna’s fictionalized story. While historical accounts credit Queen Saanthalaa Devi as the muse for these sculptures, the film replaces her with the fictional character Manjari. The screenplay, written by Samudrala Sr., combines historical elements with fictional drama. A poignant scene featuring Mallanna, blind, identifying Jakkanna’s sculpture by touch, emphasizes the emotional connection between the characters.

Amarasilpi Jakkanna marked a historic achievement as the first Telugu film to be shot in Eastmancolor. While Lava Kusa (1963) holds the distinction of being the first Telugu colour film, it was produced using Gevacolor. Amarasilpi Jakkanna pioneered the use of Eastmancolor in Telugu cinema, setting a new benchmark in the regional film industry. Despite strict limitations allowing only ten colour prints for regional films, director B. S. Ranga leveraged his expertise as a cinematographer to produce the film economically without compromising its visual grandeur. The Kannada version, Amarashilpi Jakanachari, also directed by Ranga, achieved a parallel milestone as the first Kannada film made in colour.

== Music ==
Amarasilpi Jakkanna

Film score by S. Rajeswara Rao
- Released: 1964
- Genre: Soundtrack
- Producer: S. Rajeswara Rao

The score and songs for Amarasilpi Jakkanna were composed by S. Rajeswara Rao.

Amarasilpi Jakkanna track listing
No.	Title	Lyrics	Singer(s)	Length
1.	"Ee Nallani Raallalo"	C. Narayana Reddy	Ghantasala	3:46
2.	"Andhaala Bommatho"	Dasarathi	P. Suseela	3:20
3.	"Manase Vikasincheraa"	Dasarathi	Ghantasala, P. Suseela	4:44
4.	"Murisevu Virisevu"	Samudrala	Ghantasala	4:02
5.	"Nagumomu Choopinchavaa"	C. Narayana Reddy	P. Suseela	3:38
6.	"Niluvumaa Niluvumaa"	Samudrala	Ghantasala, P. Suseela	3:12
7.	"Yechatikoyi Nee Payanam"	Dasarathi	Ghantasala	3:31
8.	"Yedho Yedho"	C. Narayana Reddy	Ghantasala, P. Suseela	3:52
9.	"Tharamaa Varadhaa"	Samudrala	Ghantasala, P. Suseela	4:10
10.	"Madhuramaina Jeevithaana"		Ghantasala
11.	"Sri Venugopala"		Ghantasala, P. Suseela
12.	"Jantarmantar"		Madhavapeddi Satyam, Swarnalatha
13.	"Mallepoolachendulanti"		Madhavapeddi Satyam, B. Vasantha

== Reception ==
Amarasilpi Jakkanna was well-received for its visual grandeur, performances, and music. Akkineni Nageswara Rao’s portrayal of Jakkanna was lauded. The film celebrated a successful 100-day run in five centres and received a Presidential Certificate of Merit.

== Awards ==
National Film Awards

- National Film Award for Best Feature Film in Telugu - 1963
