= Algodu =

Coordinates: 13°16′N 75°27′E

Alagudu
- village
- Interactive map of Alagudu
- Country: India
- State: Karnataka
- District: Mysore
- Talukas: Tirumakudal Narsipur

Government
  - Body: Gram panchayat

Population (2001)
  - Total: 5,951

Languages
  - Official: Kannada
- Time zone: UTC+5:30 (IST)
- ISO 3166 code: IN-KA
- Vehicle registration: KA
- Website: karnataka.gov.in

Algodu is a village in the southern state of Karnataka, India. It is located in the Tirumakudal Narsipur taluk of Mysore district.

== Demographics ==
As of 2001 India census, Algodu had a population of 5951 with 3001 males and 2950 females.

== See also ==
- Mysore
- Districts of Karnataka
