= Jakanachari Award =

Award for sculptors and craftsmen from Karnataka

The Jakanachari Award is a state award of Karnataka that recognizes sculptors and craftsmen from the state. These awards are given away every year by the government of Karnataka. Its name honours the contributions of the sculptor Amarashilpi Jakanachari.

== Awardees ==
S.No	Name	Birth / death	Awarded	Location	Notes
1.	C. Parameshwara Acharya	1922 (b)	1999	Karkala	
2.	R. Kalachar	1943 (b)	2003	Chitradurga	Student of Nagendrachar (grandfather) from Ajjihalli of Channagiri taluk in Davanagere. Sculptures on stone, metal, gold, silver and wood.
3.	C. Siddalingaiah		2005		
4.	Bilikere Narayanachar Channappacharya	1936 (b)	2006	Mysuru	From Bilikere village in Mysore district. He has sculpted several silver doors for various temples.
5.	Malloja Bheema Rao		2007	Bagalkot	
6.	R. Veerabhadrachar		2008	Bengaluru	
7.	K. C. Puttannachar		2009	Mysore	Kirenalli village.
8.	Venkatachalapathy		2010	Bengaluru	
9.	Kanaka Murthy		2011	Bengaluru	Lady sculptor. From small Karnataka town of T Narsipur. Disciple of Devalankunda Vadiraj. Stone sculpture in styles: Hoysala, Chola and Chalukya.
10.	G. B. Hamsanandacharya		2012		
11.	Basanna Monappa Badiger	1942 (b)	2013	Gulbarga	Known for wood carving, particularly the Surpur form with neem tree logs which are known for their hardness.
12.	Mahadevappa Shilpi		2014	Gulbarga	
13.	Shanmukappa Yarakad		2015	Ilkal	
