= Karnataka Kumbh Mela =

Karnataka Kumbh Mela is a Hindu religious gathering, or "mela", held at Tirumakudalu in T.Narasipura taluka, Mysore district, Karnataka, India.

== Triveni Sangam ==
In the village of Tirumakudalu, the three rivers Cauvery, Kapila, and Guptakamini meet. This place is referred to as Triveni Sangam.

== Aim ==
In the states of North India, in which Kumbh Mela takes place, three rivers converge. In 1989, Kumbh Mela was celebrated at Tirumakudalu Triveni Sangamam for the first time, for the benefit of the devotees who could not participate in the festival. After that, the festival was held 10 times there. After 2016, as per the announcement of the State Government, the festival was held from February 17 to February 19, 2019. As is being held once in 12 years in a rotation basis in Prayagraj, Ujjain, Nasik, and Haridwar, here the festival is being held once in three years. The main aim of starting the Kumbh Mela is to encourage pilgrims to dip at the confluence of the three rivers at T.Narasipura. The Kumbh Mela in Karnataka corresponds to the Kumbh Mela in the above-mentioned places in North India.

== About T. Narasipura ==
This place in South India, where the Kumbh Mela is held every three years, is in Skandapurana as one of the Trimakuta Kshetras (sacred places at the confluence of three rivers). 'Narasipura', the place's name, is derived from the Gunja Narasimhaswamy temple. T.Narasipura is also acknowledged as Dakshina Kashi and is considered sacred as Prayagraj, where the Ganga, Yamuna, and the mythical Saraswati join.
