= Geekalli Hundi =

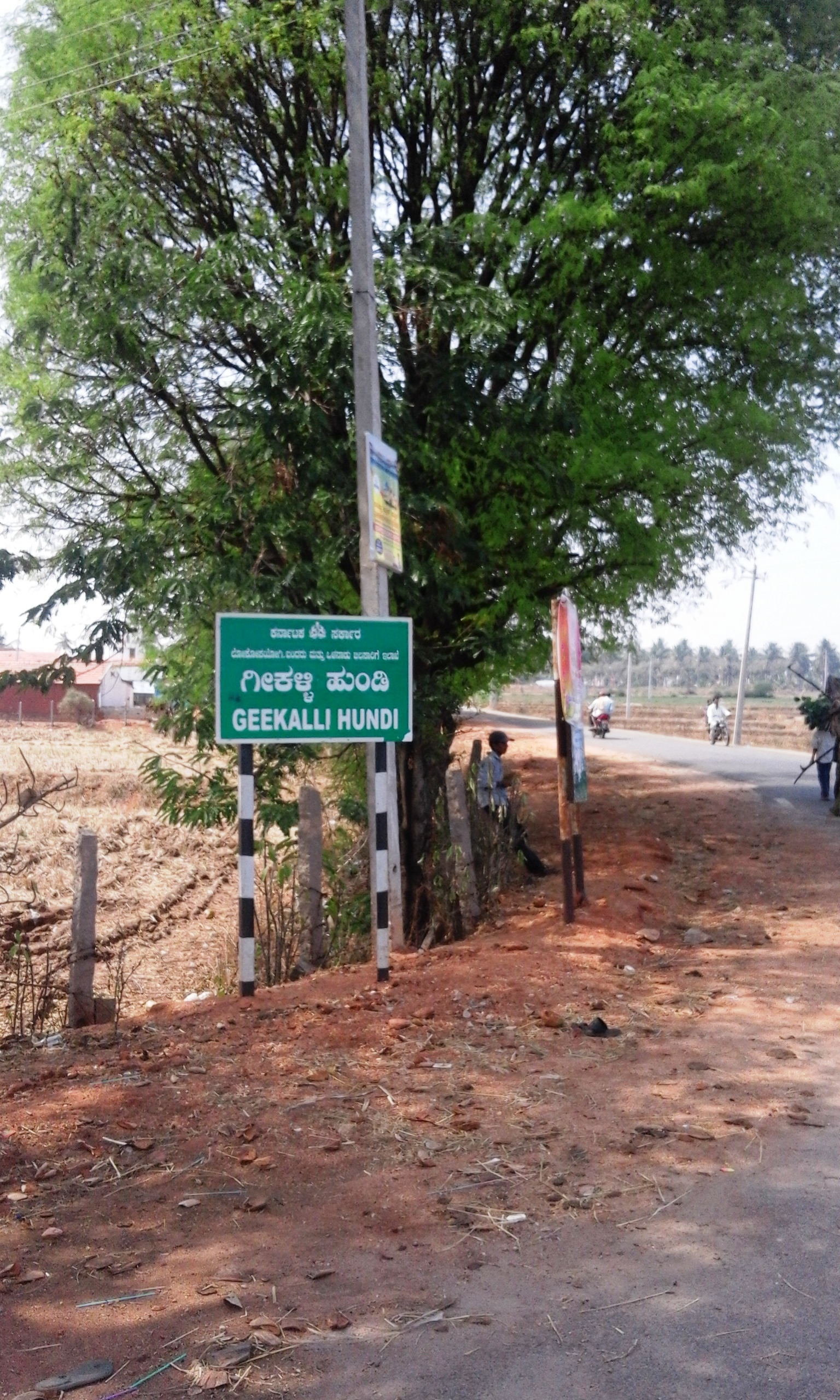
- Interactive map of Geekalli Hundi
- Coordinates: 12.11754°N 76.70225°E
- Country: India
- State: Karnataka
- District: Mysore
- Time zone: UTC+5:25 (IST)
- PIN: 571301

Geekalli Hundi is a small village near Nanjangud in Mysore district, Karnataka, India.

== Location ==
Geekalli Hundi is located on the Tirumakudal Narsipur road from Nanjangud at a distance of 4.7 kilometers.

== Industrial Pollution ==
Many residents of the village suffer from skin diseases due to industrial pollution.

== Education ==
The village has a new highschool called Samudhra Public School. This school has classes from first grade to the ninth grade.

== Image Gallery ==
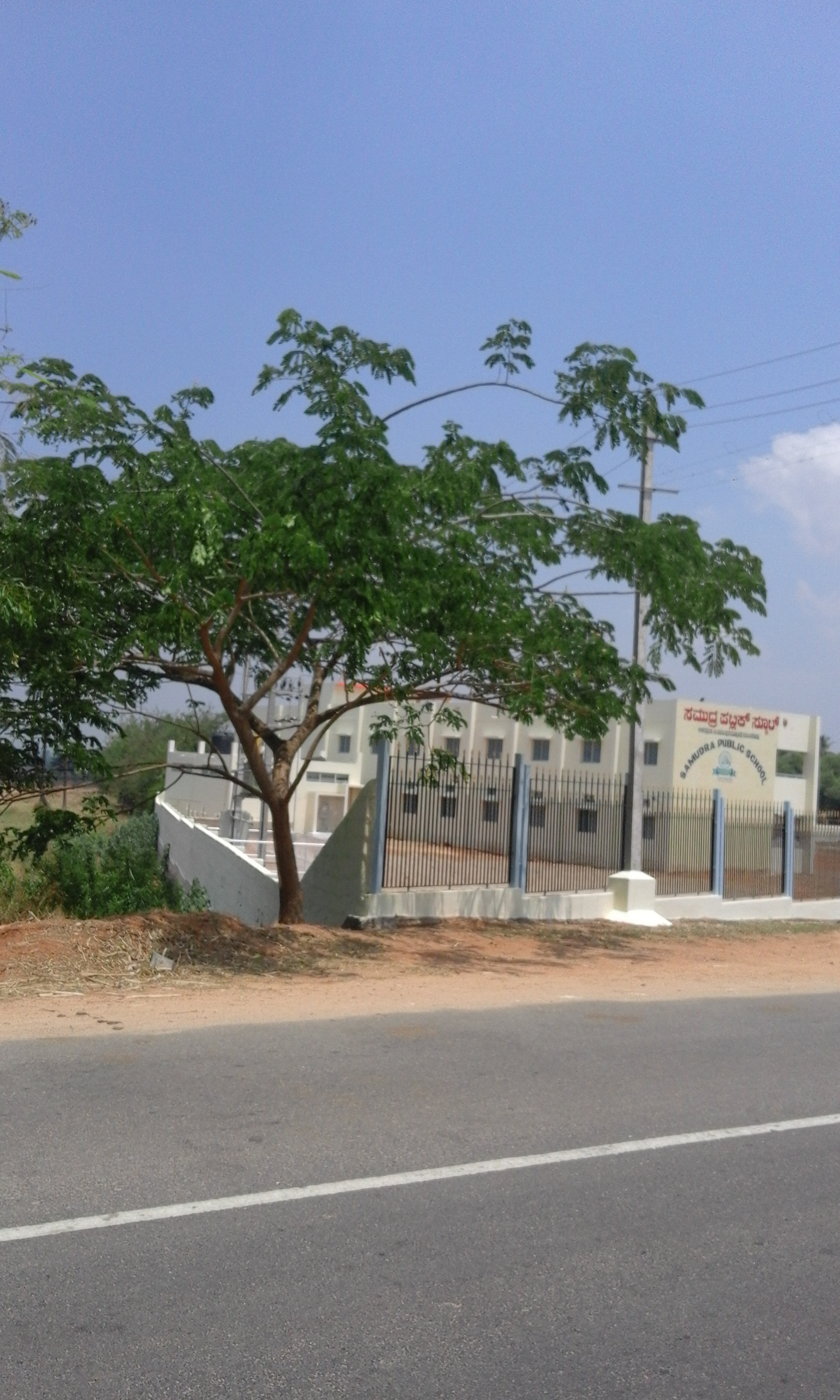
Samudra School

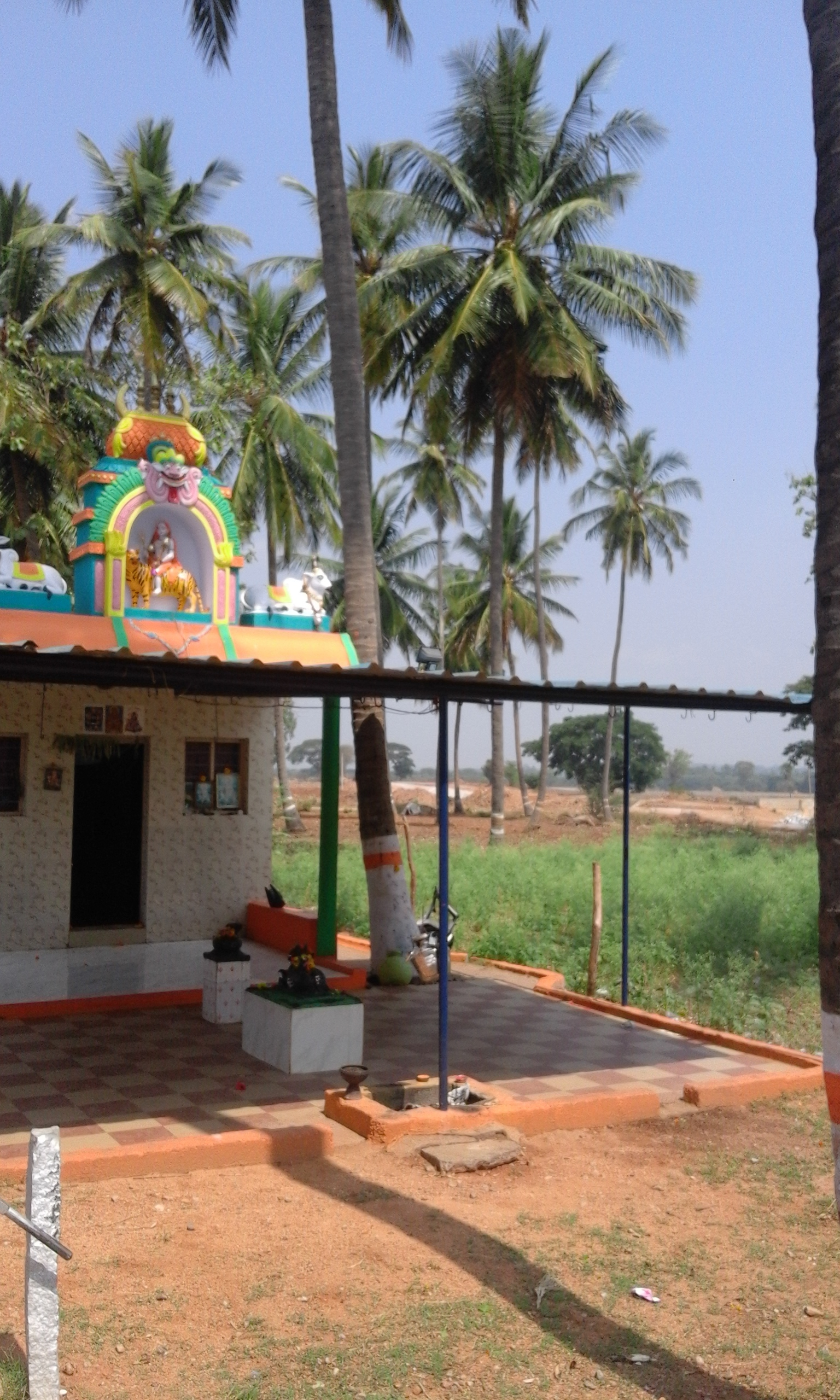
Geekalli Hundi temple

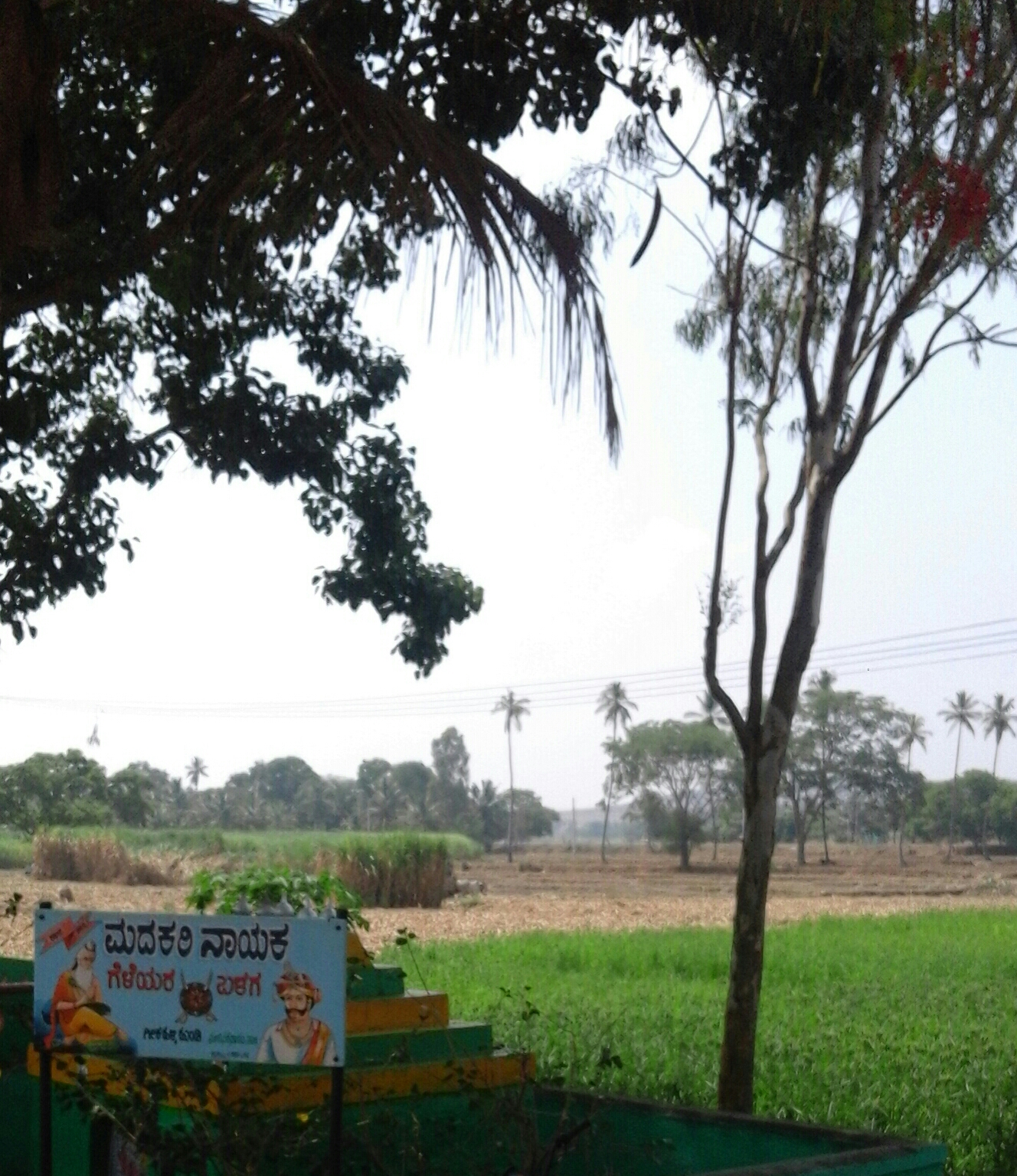
Geekalli Hundi village
