= Gunja Narasimha Swamy Temple, Tirumakudal Narasipura =

Vaishnava temple in Narasipura, Mysore, India

Gunja Narasima Swamy Temple
- Hindu temple
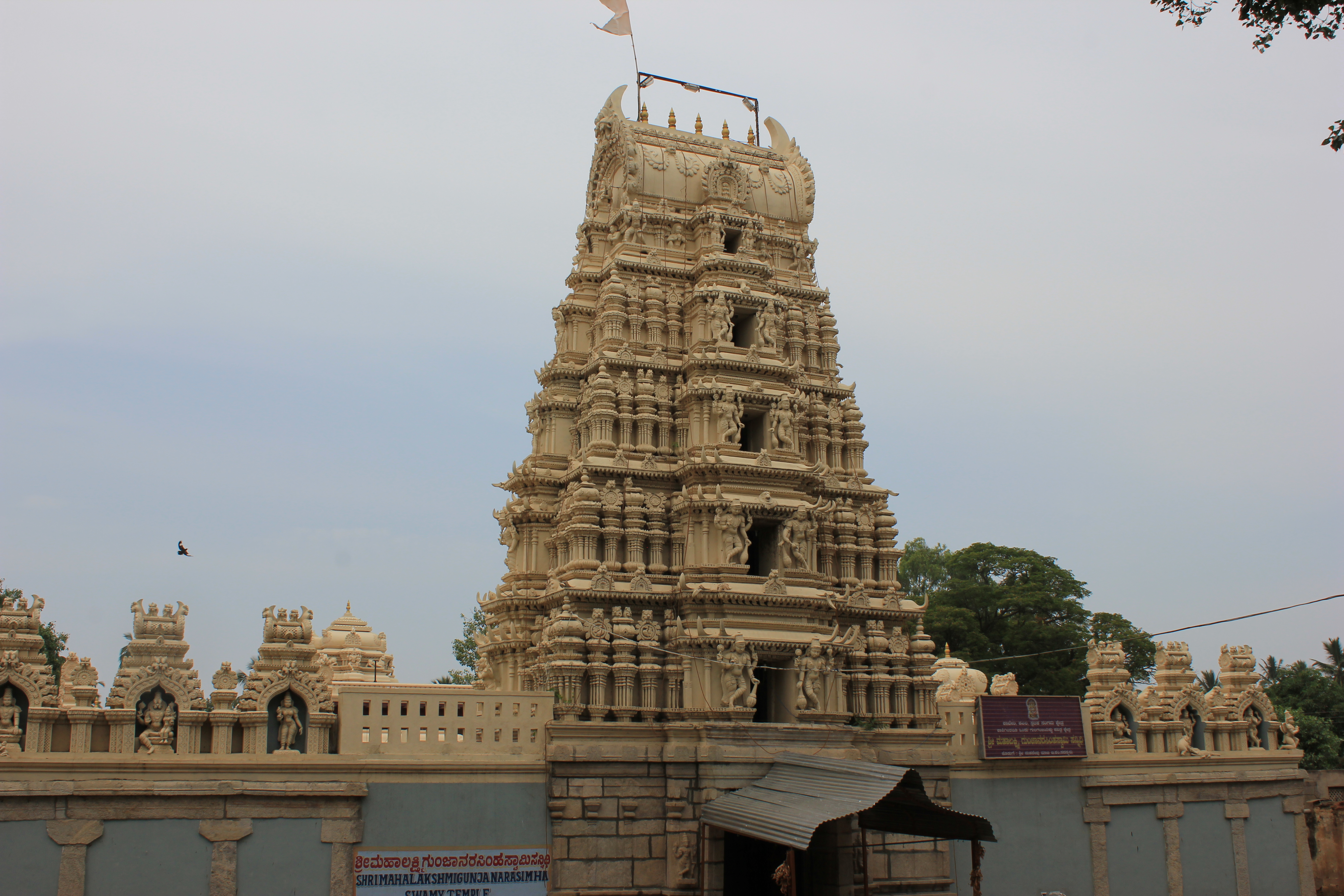
- Dravidian gopura of Gunja Narasimha Swamy temple

- Location in Karnataka, India
- Coordinates: 12.21°N 76.906°E
- Country: India
- State: Karnataka
- District: Mysore
- Talukas: Tirumakudal Narasipura

Languages
  - Official: Kannada
- Time zone: UTC+5:30 (IST)

The Gunja Narasima Swamy Temple is a Hindu temple in Tirumakudal Narasipura, a town in the Mysore district, Karnataka state, India. The town is located 20 miles south east of the historically important city of Mysore. The temple dates back to about the 16th rule of the Vijayanagara Empire and is built in typical dravidian style with an imposing gopura (tower) over the entrance gate (mahadwara) and a four pillared mantapa ("hall") in front of the sanctum. The temple is located at the confluence of the Kaveri river and the Kabini river and is considered sacred by Hindus. The temple gets its name from the Gunja(Gulaganji in Kannada) tree (Abrus precatorius) that grows in the front of the main entrance; a boastful local claim is that the temple is more sacred than Varanasi (Kashi) by the weight of a gunja plant. Sculptures in the temple include those of the Hindu god Narasimha (holding a gunja berry and stalk) and the demon King Hiranyakashipu.

According to the British Raj era historian and epigraphist B. Lewis Rice, the temple was in the patronage of the Dalavoy of Mysore ("feudal lord") with an annual maintenance. Records indicate the temple underwent repairs and embellishments during this time. The temple is a protected monument under the Karnataka state division of the Archaeological Survey of India. There is another temple close by, called the "Agastyeshwara" temple, and both temples are the venue of a religious fair (Jatra) that is held annually attracting large number of devotees.

== Gallery ==
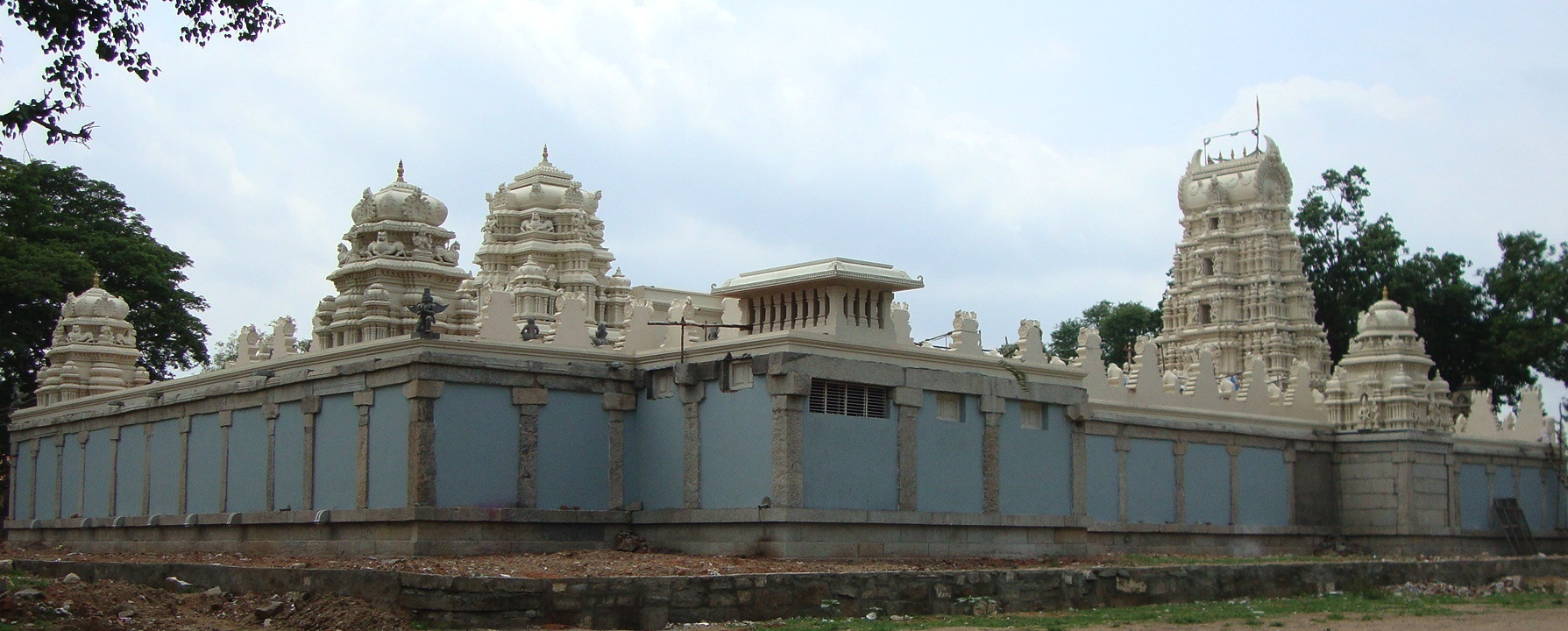
Gunja Narasimha Swamy temple complex, from outside the prakara at Tirumakudal Narasipura

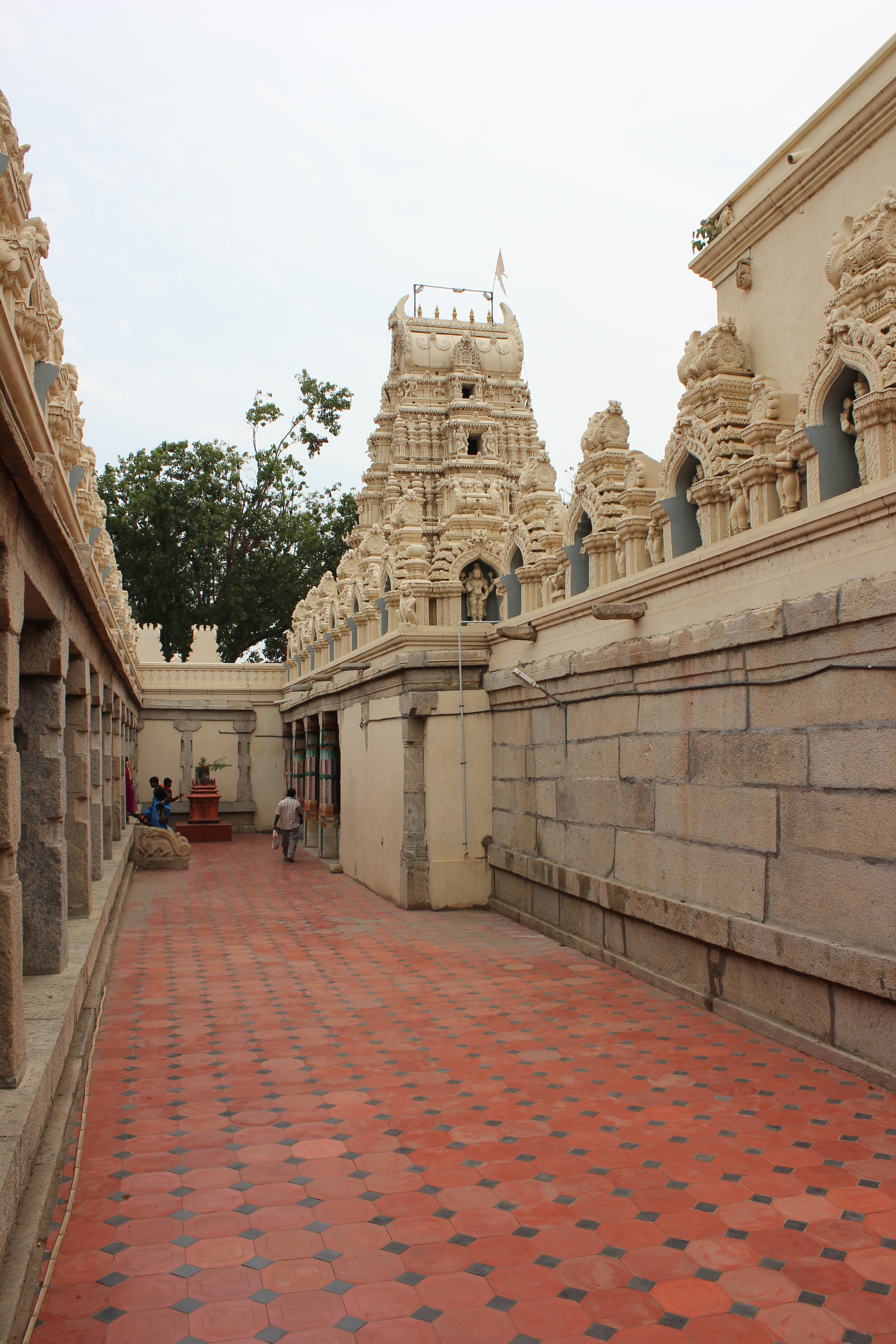
View from the rear in the Gunjanarasimhaswamy temple at Tirumakudal Narasipura

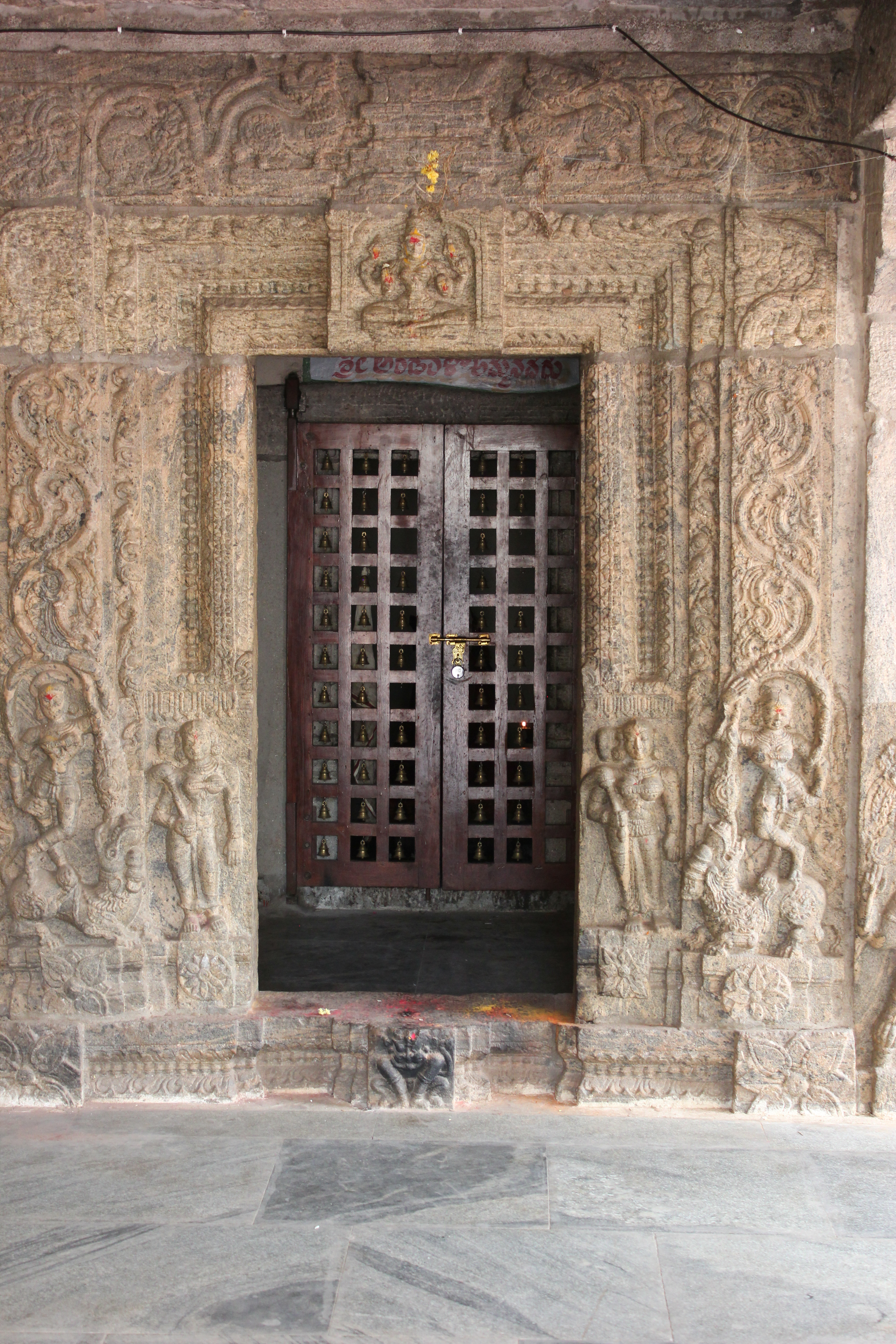
Decorative door jamb and lintel over a minor shrine in the rear prakara of the Gunja Narasimha Swamy temple at Tirumakudal Narasipura

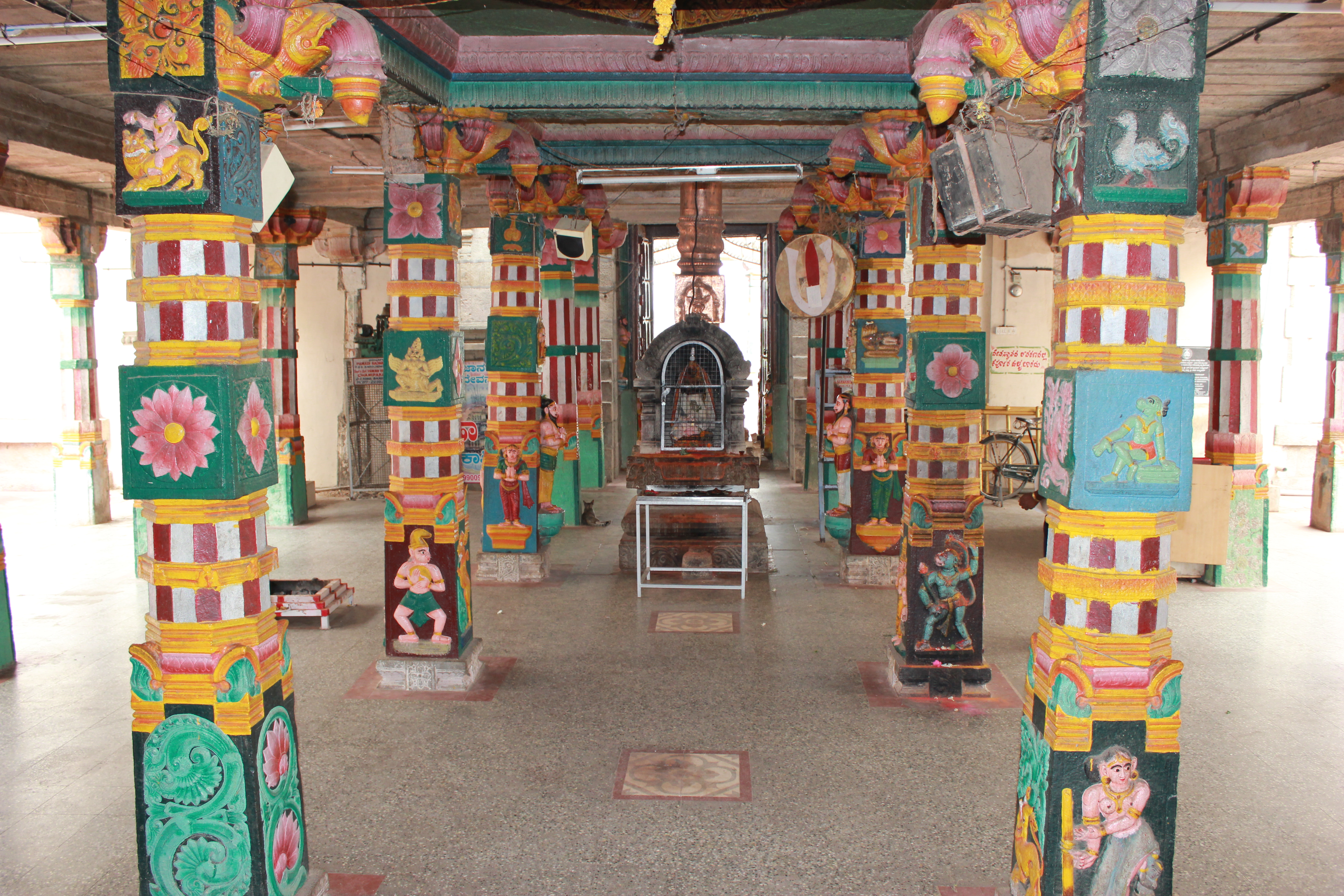
Pillared entrance to mantapa of the Gunja Narasimhaswamy temple at Tirumakudal Narasipura
