= Kanaka Murthy =

Indian sculptor and author (1942–2021)

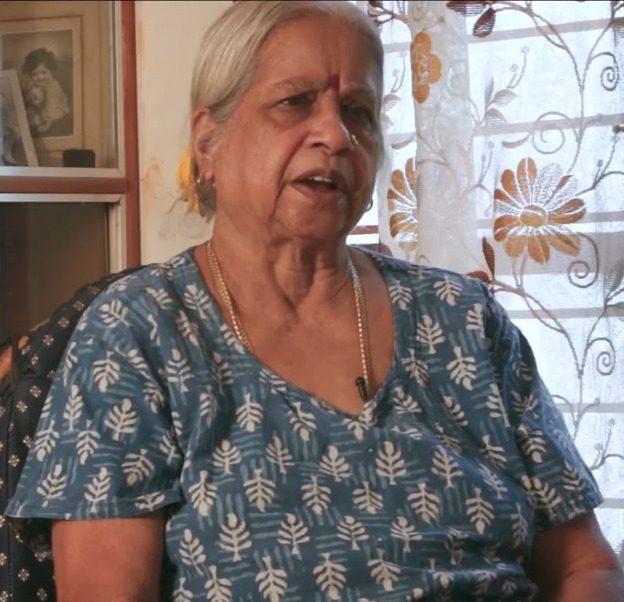
Murthy in 2019

Kanaka Murthy (2 December 1942 – 14 May 2021) was an Indian sculptor, working primarily in stone. She received several awards in India for her work, including the Jakanachari Award in 2011, and the Rajyotsava Award in 1996. A number of her sculptures were commissioned and installed in public places in India, particularly in temples for worship, as well as public installations in the city of Bengaluru. She also wrote several books about Indian art and sculpture.

== Biography ==
Murthy was born in a brahmin family on 2 December 1942 in Tirumakudal Narsipur, Mysore district, in the state of Karnataka, in India. Murthy attended college in Bengaluru, where she earned a Bachelor in Sciences, and later studied at Kalamandira, an arts college, where she trained in painting, drawing, and sculpture. She also studied sculpture with D Vadiraja, a well-known local sculptor. She married Narayana Murthy and they had a son, Rumi Harish. On 14 May 2021, she died of COVID-19 at the age of 79, in Bengaluru.

== Career and works ==
Murthy worked primarily in stone, using sandstone, shell stone, and granite. Although trained in the Hoysala style of sculpture, she explored other schools and forms of sculpture. She also sculpted in bronze, fibreglass, and clay. She has also worked with schist, despite the fact that it is easily split, in consonance with sculptural tradition in the state of Karnataka.

Murthy was known for her sculpted stone portraits, primarily busts. She notably created busts of several classical Carnatic and Hindustani musicians, including Gangubai Hangal, Doraiswamy Iyengar, T Chowdiah, Mallikarjuna Mansur and Bhimsen Joshi. A number of her stone portrait busts were commissioned and are installed in public places in Bengaluru, Karnataka. These include a bust of the poet and writer Kuvempu, located at the west gate of Lalbagh Park, and a fibreglass statue of the Wright brothers at the Visvesvaraya Industrial and Technological Museum. In total, 200 of her sculptures have been installed in public spaces in India.

Murthy spoke in several interviews about the challenges of breaking into the profession of sculpture, which was traditionally male-dominated, as a woman. She was one of the few women in Karnataka to create sculptures for religious worship in temples. Murthy has also stated that her inspiration to take up sculpting was from visiting temples containing religious sculptures in Mysuru. A number of her sculptures of Hindu idols are installed in places of worship, including an eight foot high idol of the Hindu god Ganesha, commissioned for a religious foundation dedicated to spiritual leader Sathya Sai Baba at Puttaparthi.

She also wrote four books, including an autobiography. One book, titled Shilpa Rekha, is an account of traditional line drawings in Karnataka. She also wrote a biography of her guru Devalakunda Vadiraj.

== Honours and awards ==
Murthy won a number of state awards for her work, including the Karnataka Jakanachari Award, State Shilpakala Academy Award (1999), the Rajyotsava Award (1996) and Suvarna Karnataka Award. She is the only woman to have received the Janakachari Award.
