= Jakanachari =

Legendary Indian sculptor

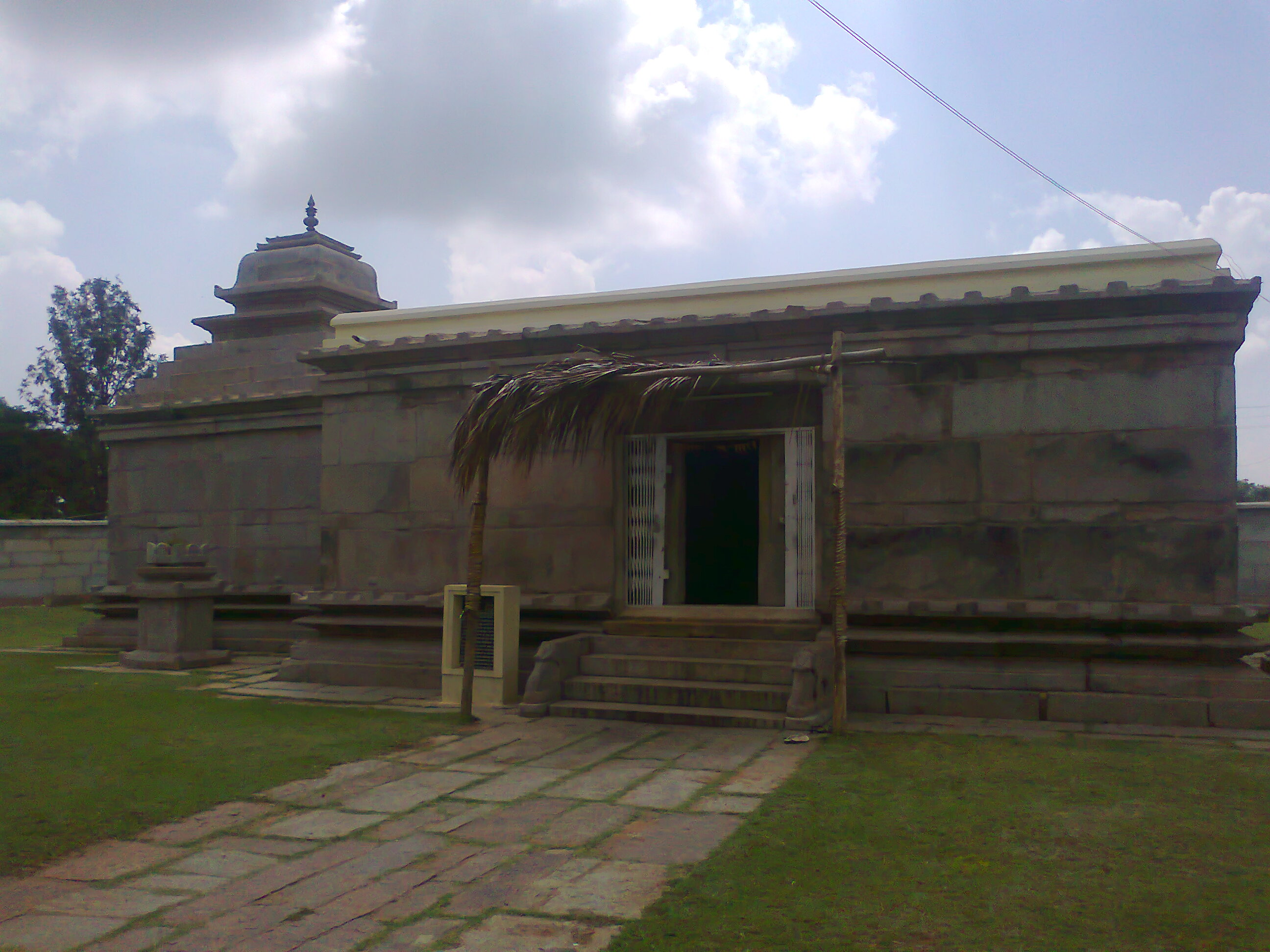
Chennakeshava temple, Kaidala

Jakanachari was a legendary Indian sculptor credited with building many fine temples for the Kalyani Chalukyas and Hoysalas. He is popularly known by the epithet Amarashilpi (transl. The Eternal Sculptor).

== His life ==
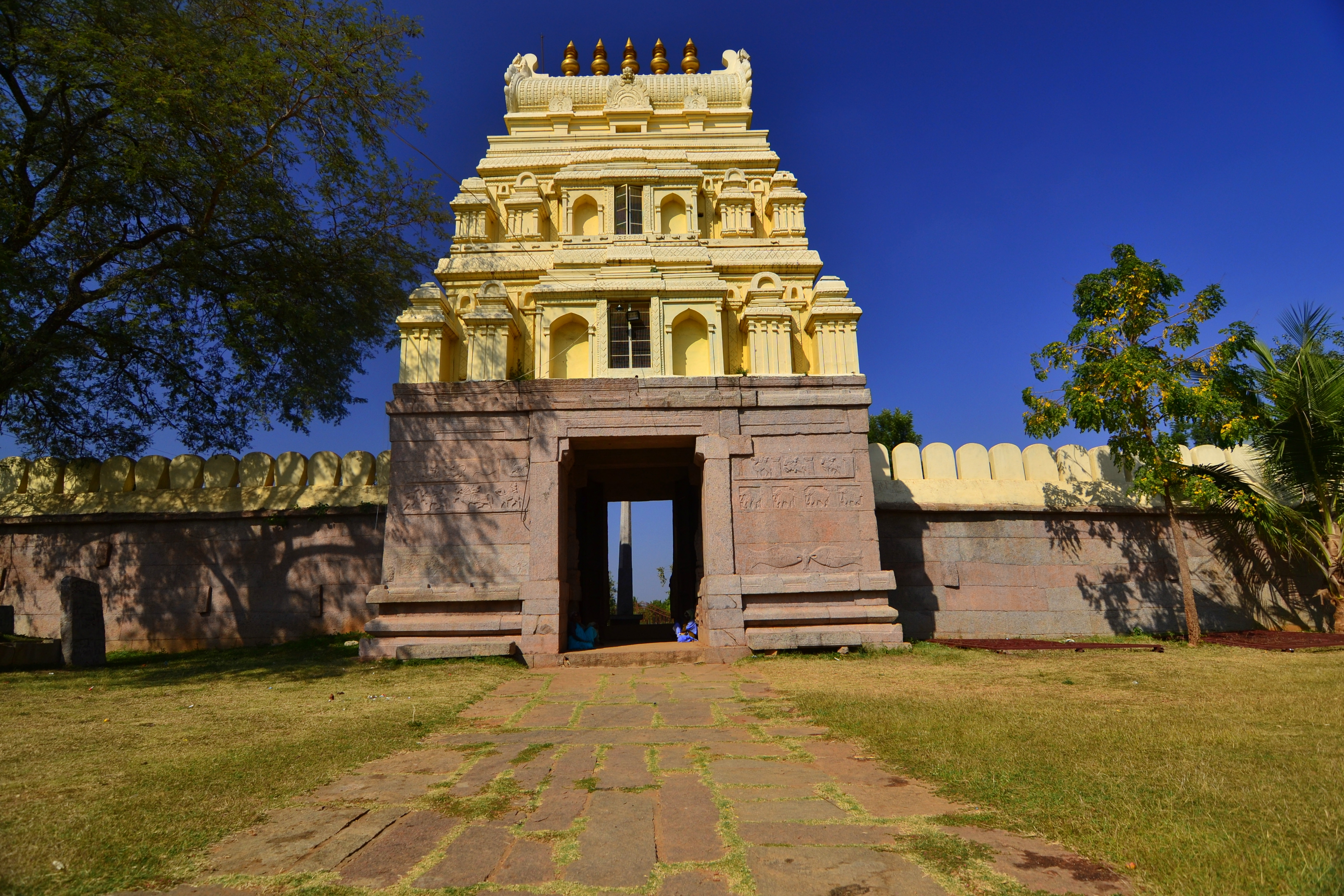
Entrance of Channakeshava Temple, Kaidala

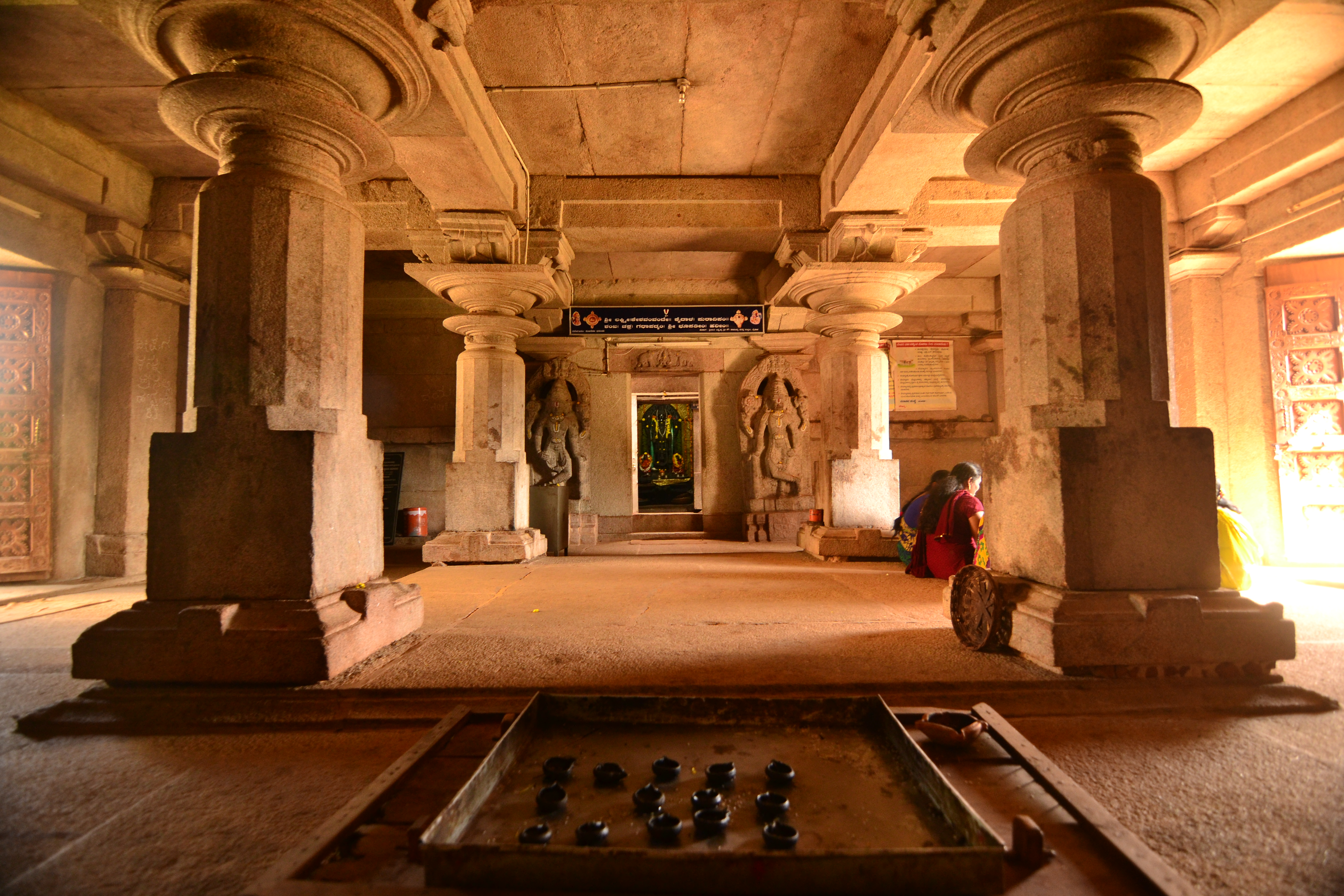
Interior of Chennakeshava Temple, Kaidala

Jakanachari was born in a small village called Kaidala, 9 km from Tumkur in Karnataka. The original name of the town as per records was Kridapura. His life was one of love and dedication to art. His career began when Nripa Haya ruled as a local chieftain of the area. He left home shortly after his marriage choosing utter devotion to god over family. He travelled far and wide building many temples.

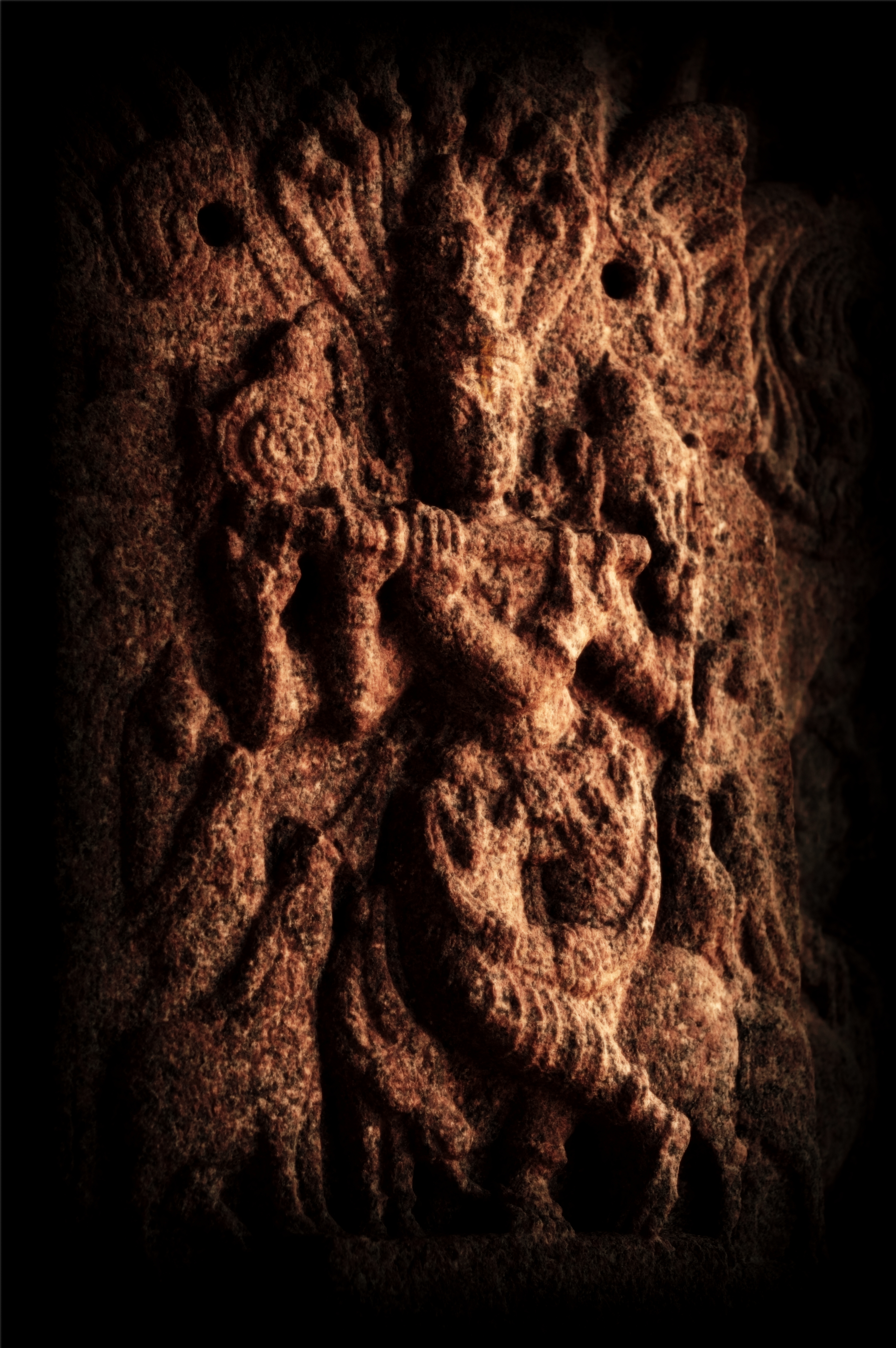
Krishna in relief at the entrance of Channakeshava Temple, Kaidala

== Jakanachari and his son ==
Jakanachari's wife, Kalalaambe, gave birth to his child, named Dankanacharya. Dankanacharya himself grew up to become a famous sculptor and set out to find his father. At Belur, he found a job as a sculptor and noticed a flaw in a figure sculpted by the great Jakanacharya himself. Dankanacharya told Jakanacharya that the stone which he was carving had a toad living inside which was a considered to be a flaw by the sculptors. Furious at this, Jakanacharya challenged to cut off his right hand if the young sculptor was correct in his assessment of the sculpture. Dankanacharya chiselled the place where the flaw was present and a toad jumped out with a little water flowing from that spot. Upon testing the figure, the flaw was indeed revealed and Jakanacharya kept his promise and cut off his right hand but Dankanacharya insisted not to do so. Eventually, the two sculptors become aware of their relationship as father and son.

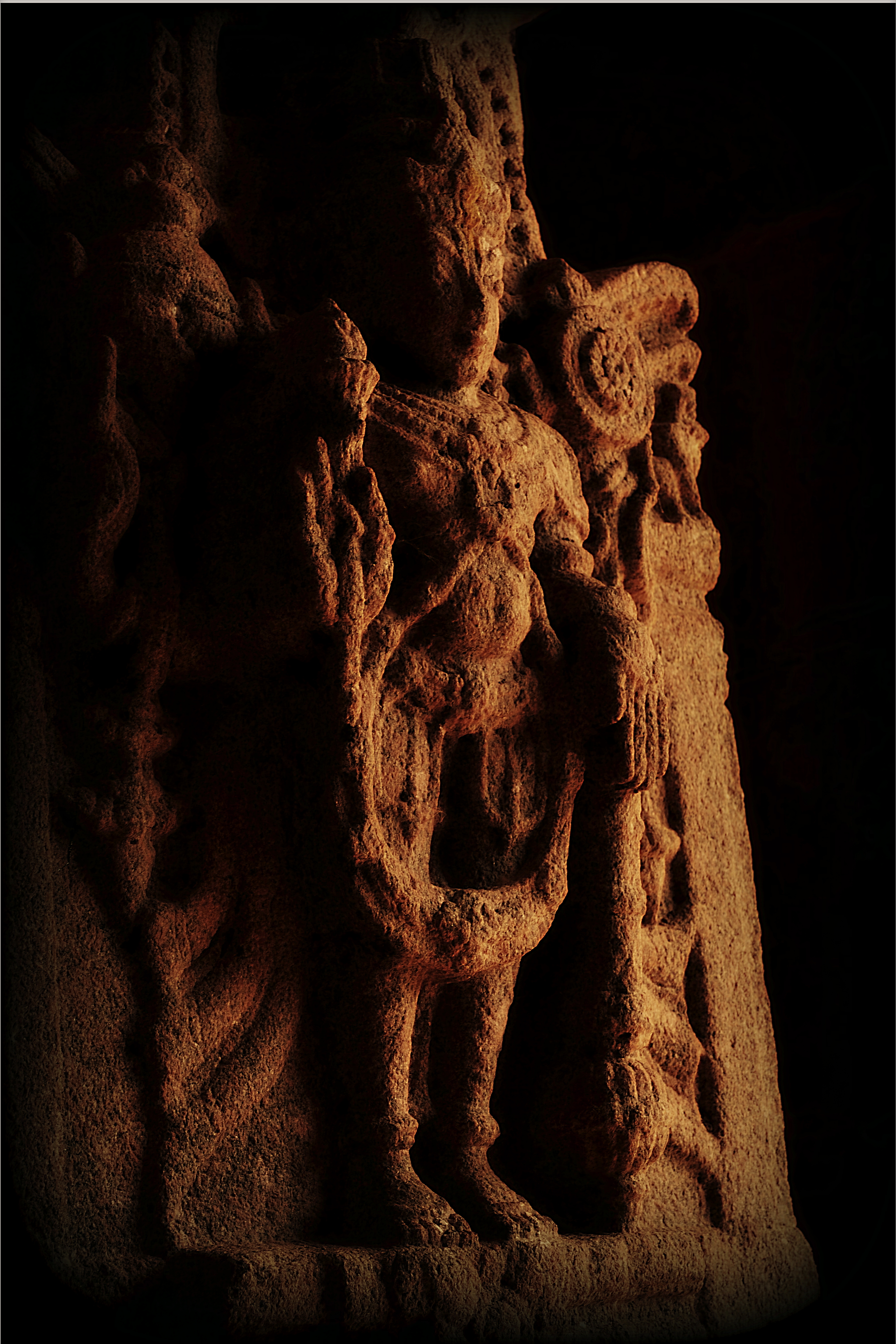
Vishnu relief adorning entrance of Channakeshava Temple, Kaidala

== Chennakeshava temple ==
Subsequently, Jakanacharya received a vision to build the Chennakeshava temple in his native place Kridapura. After this was completed, legend has it that God restored his right hand. In celebration of this incident, Kridapura was henceforth called Kaidala. The term Kai in Kannada means "hand". Local non-government organizations in the state of Karnataka have been trying to raise funds to protect the Chennakeshava temple at Kaidala.

== The Jakanchari Awards ==
The government of Karnataka confers the Jakanachari Awards to talented sculptors and craftsmen from the state every year to celebrate the contributions of this legendary architect.

== Film ==
In 1964, a Kannada biographical film about him, Amarashilpi Jakanachari starring Kalyan Kumar and Saroja Devi was produced. Cinematographer BS Ranga was instrumental in the making of this movie, the first Kannada colour movie. Simultaneously in 1964, a Telugu remake of the movie titled Amarasilpi Jakkanna starring Akkineni Nageswara Rao and Saroja Devi was also released.
