= Ajjihalli, Uttara Kannada =

Ajjihalli
- village
- Ajjihalli, Mundgod is in Uttara Kannada district
- Country: India
- State: Karnataka
- District: Uttara Kannada
- Talukas: Mundgod

Government
  - Body: Village Panchayat

Languages
  - Official: Kannada
- Time zone: UTC+5:30 (IST)
- Nearest city: Uttara Kannada
- Civic agency: Village Panchayat

Ajjihalli, Mundgod is a village in the southern state of Karnataka, India. It is located in the Mundgod taluk of Uttara Kannada district.

== See also ==
- Uttara Kannada
- Districts of Karnataka
