= Amarashilpi Jakanachari (film) =

1964 Kannada film

- Directed by: B. S. Ranga
- Written by: Shyamala Devi
- Screenplay by: Balasubramanyam
- Produced by: B. S. Ranga
- Starring: Kalyan Kumar; B. Saroja Devi; Udaykumar; V. Nagayya
- Cinematography: B. N. Haridas
- Edited by: P. G. Mohan; M. Devendranath; Chakrapani
- Music by: S. Rajeswara Rao
- Production company: Vikram Productions
- Release date: 15 April 1964
- Country: India
- Language: Kannada

Amarashilpi Jakanachari is a 1964 Indian Kannada-language film directed and produced by B. S. Ranga. It stars Kalyan Kumar in the titular role of Amarashilpi Jakanachari, a sculptor from the 12th-century Hoysala Empire. The film also features B. Saroja Devi, Udaykumar and V. Nagayya. The film's score and soundtrack were composed by S. Rajeswara Rao. It was the first Kannada feature film to be fully shot in colour.

== Cast ==
- Kalyan Kumar as Amarashilpi Jakanachari
- B. Saroja Devi as Manjari
- Udaykumar
- V. Nagayya
- Dhoolipala
- Narasimharaju
- D. Raghavendra Rao
- H. R. Shastry
- Balaraju
- Shyam
- Srinivas
- Ramadevi
- Girija
- Pushpavalli
- Shakunthala
- H. B. Soraja
- Chiranjeevi Kaleshwari
- J. Jayalalithaa in a dance sequence
- Ratan Kumar in a dance sequence

== Production ==
B. S. Ranga drew inspiration for the film from his childhood visits to the Hoysala temples at Halebidu and Belur. The sculptural heritage of these temples, particularly the 42 Madanikas (celestial dancers) sculpted at the Chennakesava Temple, forms the backdrop for Jakkanna’s fictionalized story. While historical accounts credit Queen Saanthalaa Devi as the muse for these sculptures, the film replaces her with the fictional character Manjari. The screenplay, written by Samudrala Sr., combines historical elements with fictional drama. A poignant scene featuring Jakkanna's blind father Mallanna identifying Jakkanna’s sculpture by touch emphasizes the emotional connection between the characters.
