= Thirumakudalu Narasipura =

Thirumakudalu Narasipura T. N. Pura
- Town
- T. Narasipura
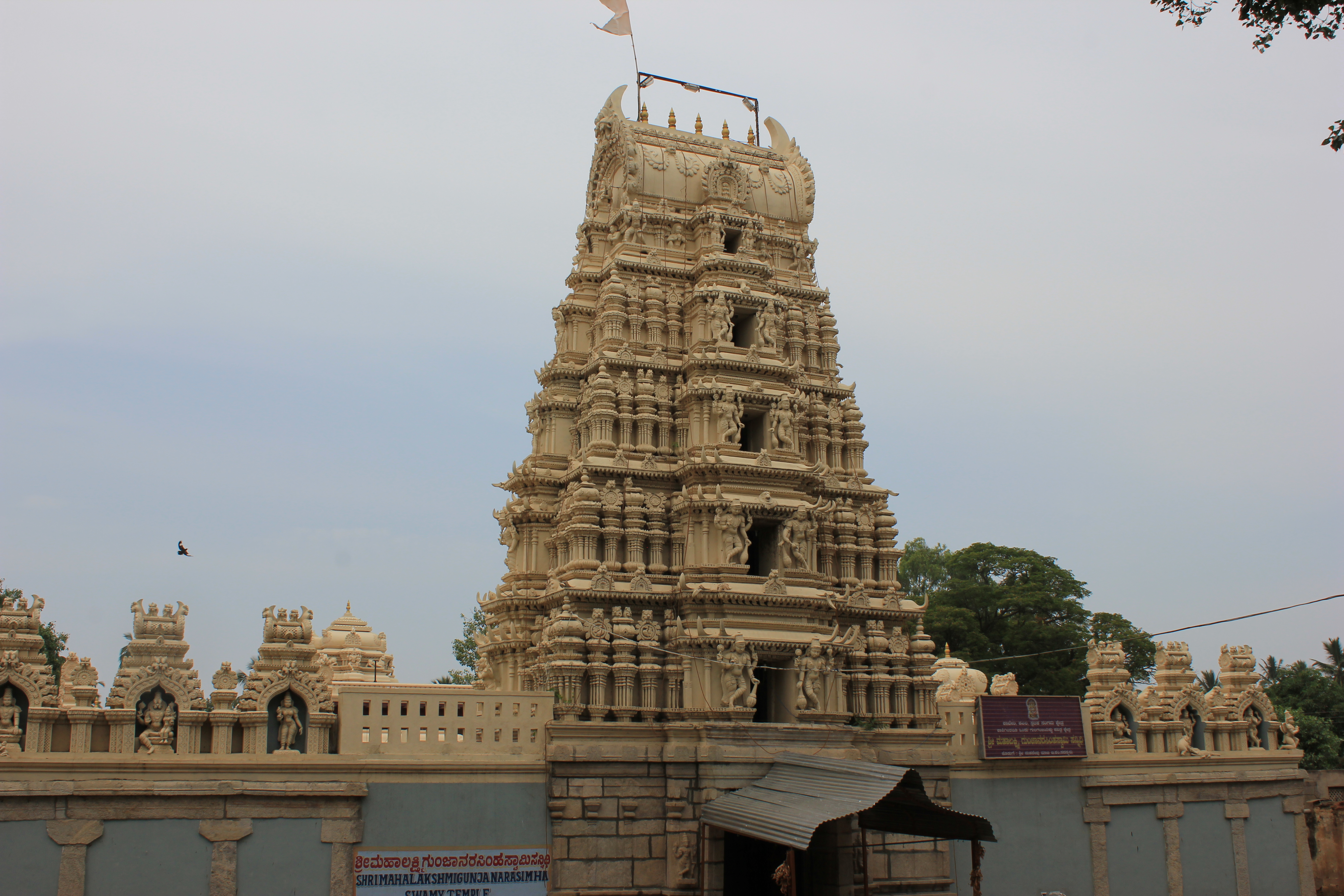
- Gunja Narasimha swamy temple, Narasipura
- Nickname: Temple City
- Interactive map of Thirumakudalu Narasipura
- Coordinates: 12°12′45″N 76°54′13″E
- Country: India
- State: Karnataka
- District: Mysore
- Elevation: 638 m (2,093 ft)

Population
  - Total: 31,498

Languages
  - Official: Kannada
- Time zone: UTC+5:30 (IST)
- PIN: 571 124
- Telephone code: 08227
- Vehicle registration: KA-55 KA-09

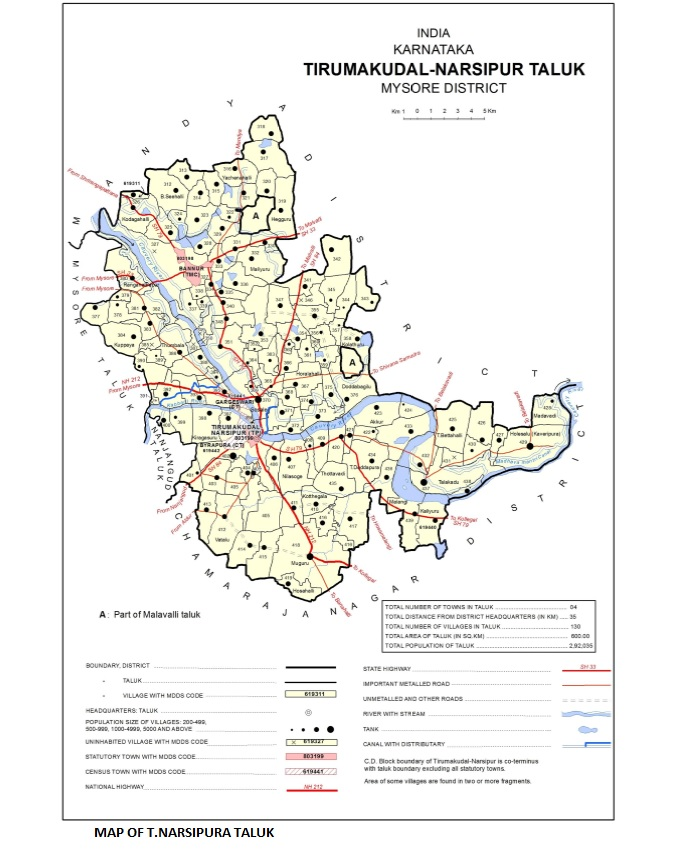
T. Narasipura Taluk Map

Tirumakudalu Narasipura (Tirumakūḍalu Narasīpura) the temple city of Karnataka, commonly known as T. Narasipura or T.N. Pura, is a town in Mysore district in the Indian state of Karnataka. The city is a Taluk of Mysore district and 32 km south-east of the district headquarters and has five Hobli centers. This taluk is bordered by Chamarajanagar district to the south and Mandya districts to the north with an area of 598 sq km. Agriculture is the main occupation of the people here. Rice is the main food crop and silk is the main commercial crop. Fossils of Neolithic age have been found by excavation in some lands of this Taluk. Vyasatirtha, the guru of Purandara Dasa, and T Chowdiah, the violinist, were born in this Taluk. Talakad, the capital of the Western Ganga dynasty, is in the Taluk.

It is the location in South India where Kumbhamela is held every three years. The Skanda Purana said it was one of the Trimakuta Kshetras (holy places at the confluence of three rivers).

== Archeological significance ==
T. Narasipura and its surrounding areas are prehistoric sites where many Neolithic sites have been unearthed by the Department of Archeology and Museums of Karnataka. The rich and fertile areas of the taluka cultivated by the Kaveri and its tributaries, has been the source of continued uninhibited human habitation, over the centuries, as verified by the ancient archeological evidences discovered in the area. The ancient sites excavated in the late fifties and up to mid-sixties (between 1959 and 1965) on the left bank of the Kaveri near the Bhiksheswara Temple, opposite to Narasipura town, which form part of the Upper Kaveri basin, has established the Neolithic phase in the region claiming a date from the first half of second millennium BC which saw the gradual evolution of the peasants into food producing and settled communities responsible for the growth of civilization. The systematic ground excavations comprising burial ground remnants, potteries, graffiti, stone implements, metal objects, beads and bangles, animal remains, human remains, wood remains, etc. examined in depth and in great detail have revealed four cultural phases at the sites, but the most outstanding phase has been deduced as the Neolithic phase.

An authoritative report on the "Excavations at T.Narasipur" by Prof M.Seshadri, Director of Archeology of Mysore published in 1971 provides a detailed insight into the ancient pre-historic civilizational bearings of T. Narasipura town and its surroundings.

== Demographics ==
As of 2001 India census, Tirumakudalu Narasipura town had a population of 9,930. Males constitute 50% of the population and females 50%. It has an average literacy rate of 66%, higher than the national average of 59.5%: male literacy is 73%, and female literacy is 59%. 11% of the population is under 6 years of age.

== Temples ==
The Gunja Narasimha Swamy temple on the right bank of the Kaveri river, is a massive complex belonging to the Vijayanagara period. It has inscriptions dating from the Krishnadevaraya period with a mélange of Dravidian and Hoysala Architecture and is renowned for the voluminous records in Nagari script.

Agasthyeshwara temple in the town predates Gunja Narasimha Swamy temple. (Agastya founded and sanctified the Agasthyeshwara temple. This temple complex contains many monuments belonging to the Ganga, Chola, Hoysala and Vijayanagara periods at Thirumakudlu, and also at the Bhiksheswara temple, the Moolasthaneshwara temple and the Anandeswara temple in the surrounding area.

== Religious festivals ==
The Kumbha Mela of T. Narasipura, of recent origin, since 1989, is an event that occurs once in three years.

The Kumbha Mela of Allahabad and Nasik is replicated at T. Narasipura when lakhs of devotees assemble and take a ritual dip in the confluence of three rivers. A slice of ancient India unfolds as ochre-clad sadhus join people to take a dip at the confluence of the Kaveri, the Kabini, and the mythical lake "Spatika Sarovara".

== Notable people ==
- Chowdiah - Carnatic violin maestro
- Vatal Nagaraj - member of Karnataka Legislative Assembly
- Siddaramaiah - chief minister of Karnataka
- Kanaka Murthy - sculptor and author
- S.M. Siddaiah - Former Member of Parliament representing Chamarajanagar constituency

== Gallery ==
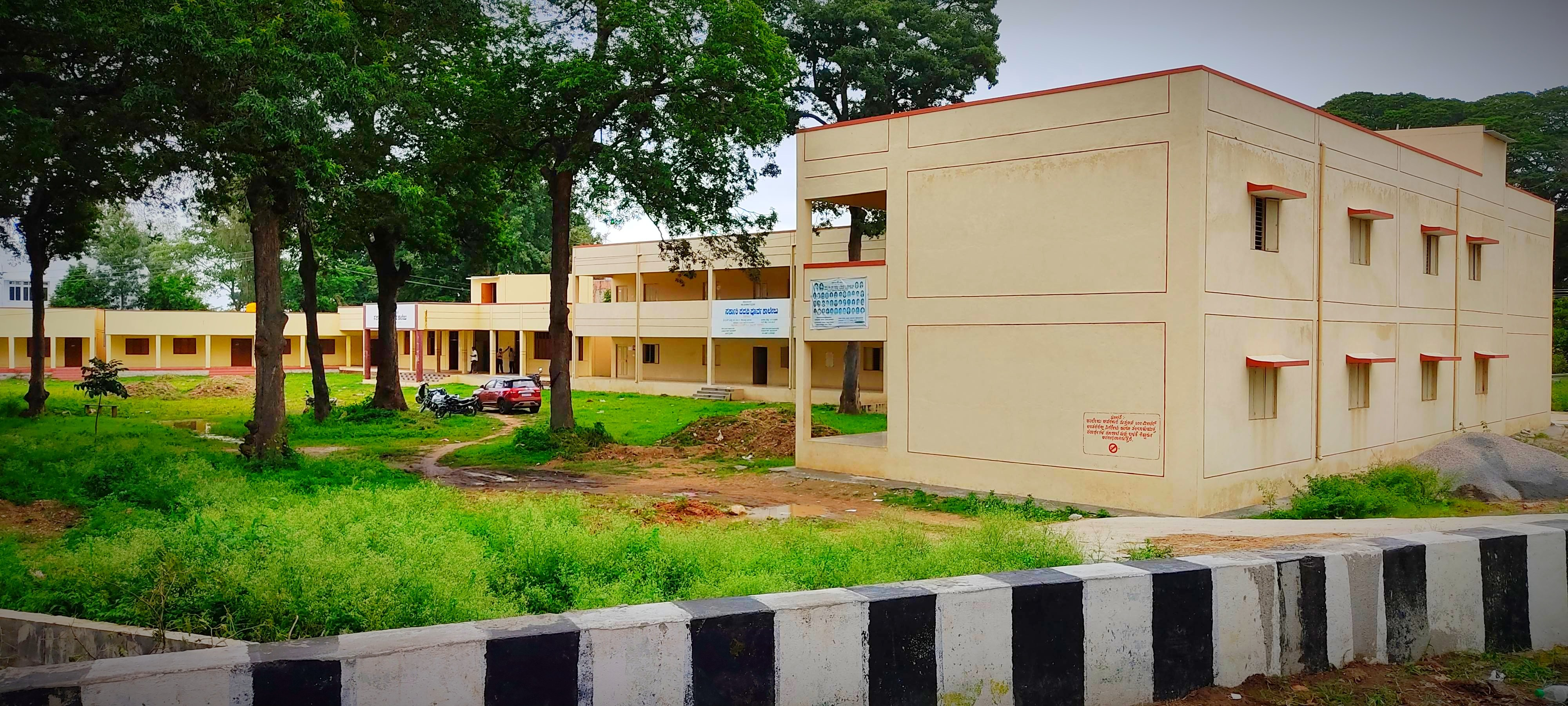
Government PU college in Narasipura

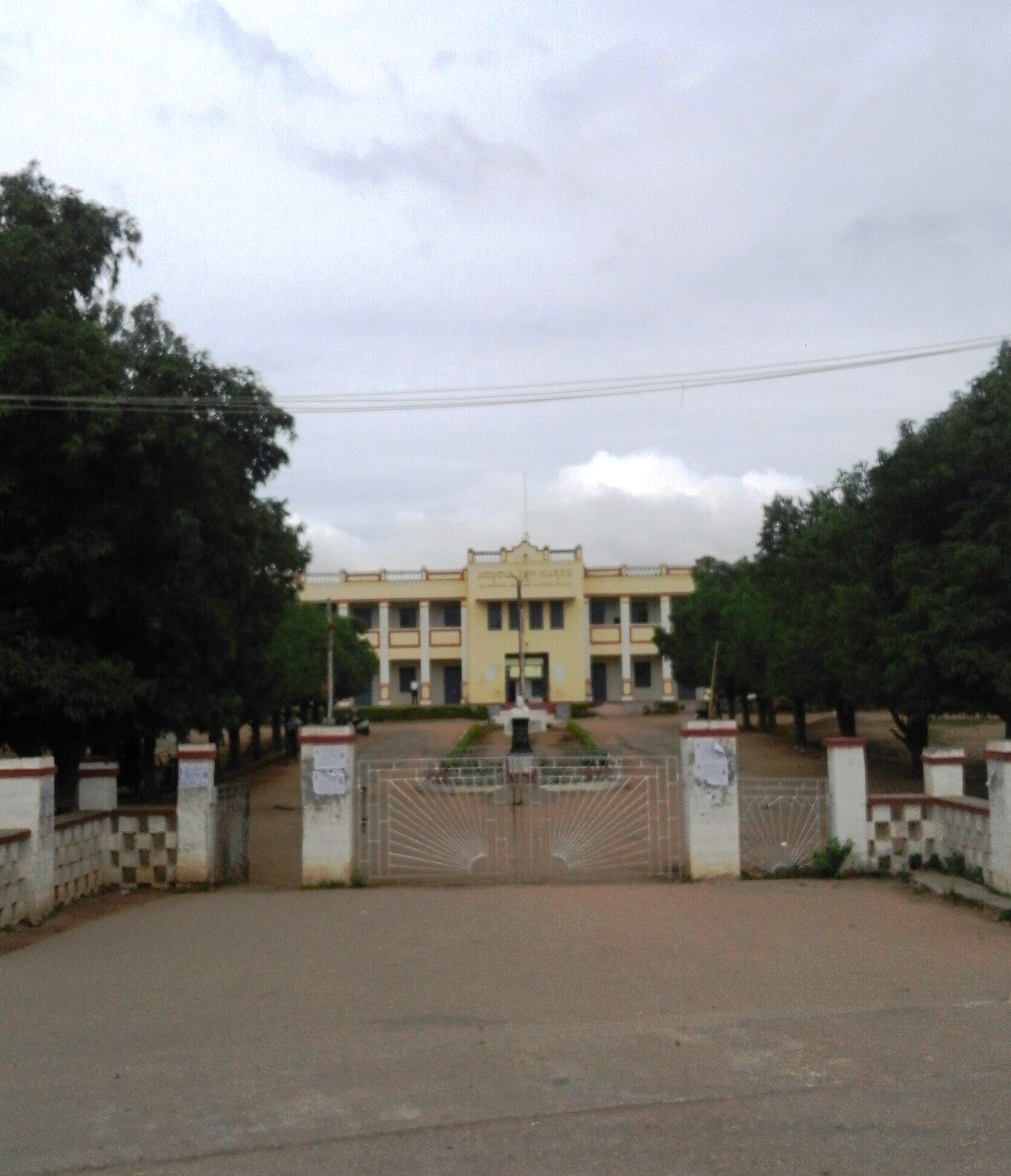
Vidyodaya College

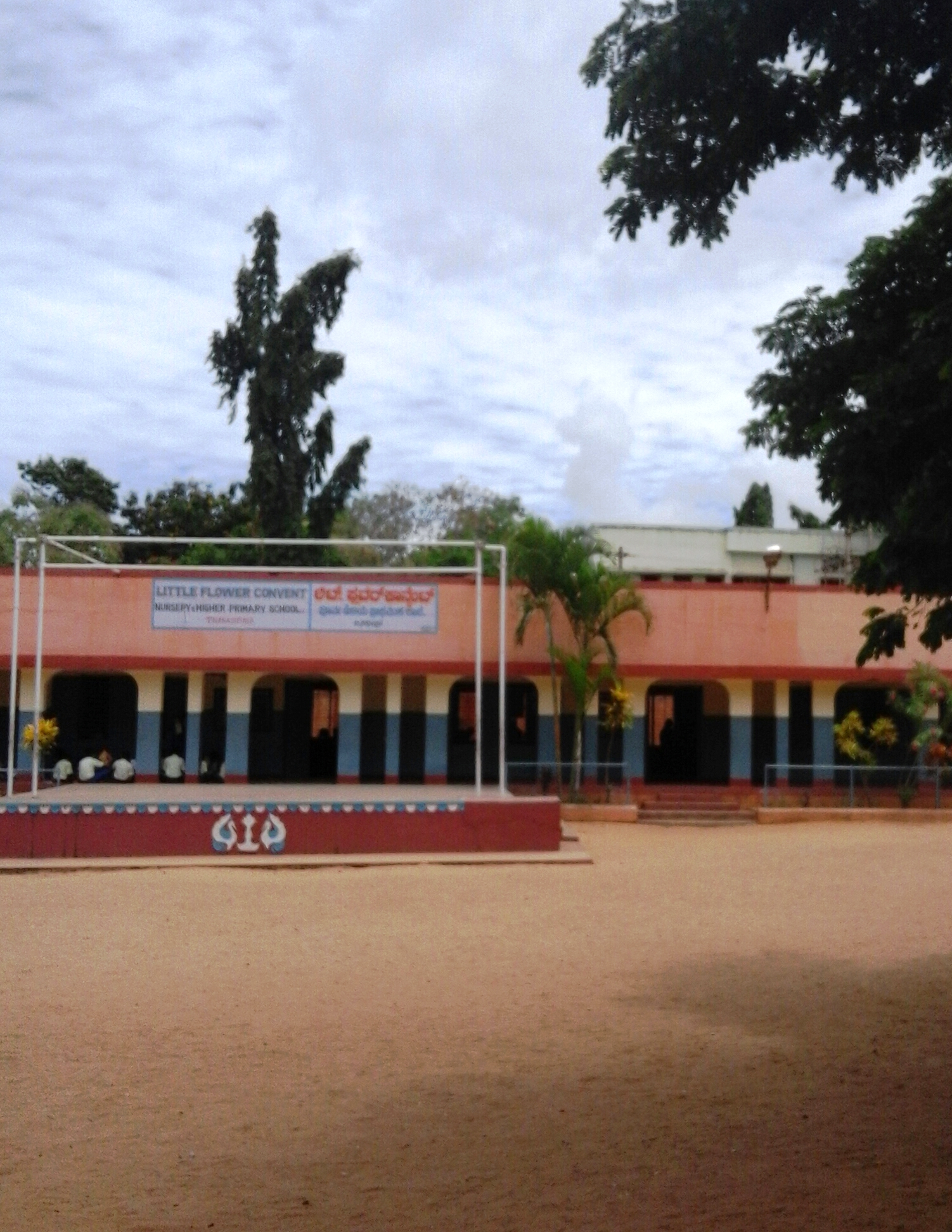
Little Flower school, Narasipura

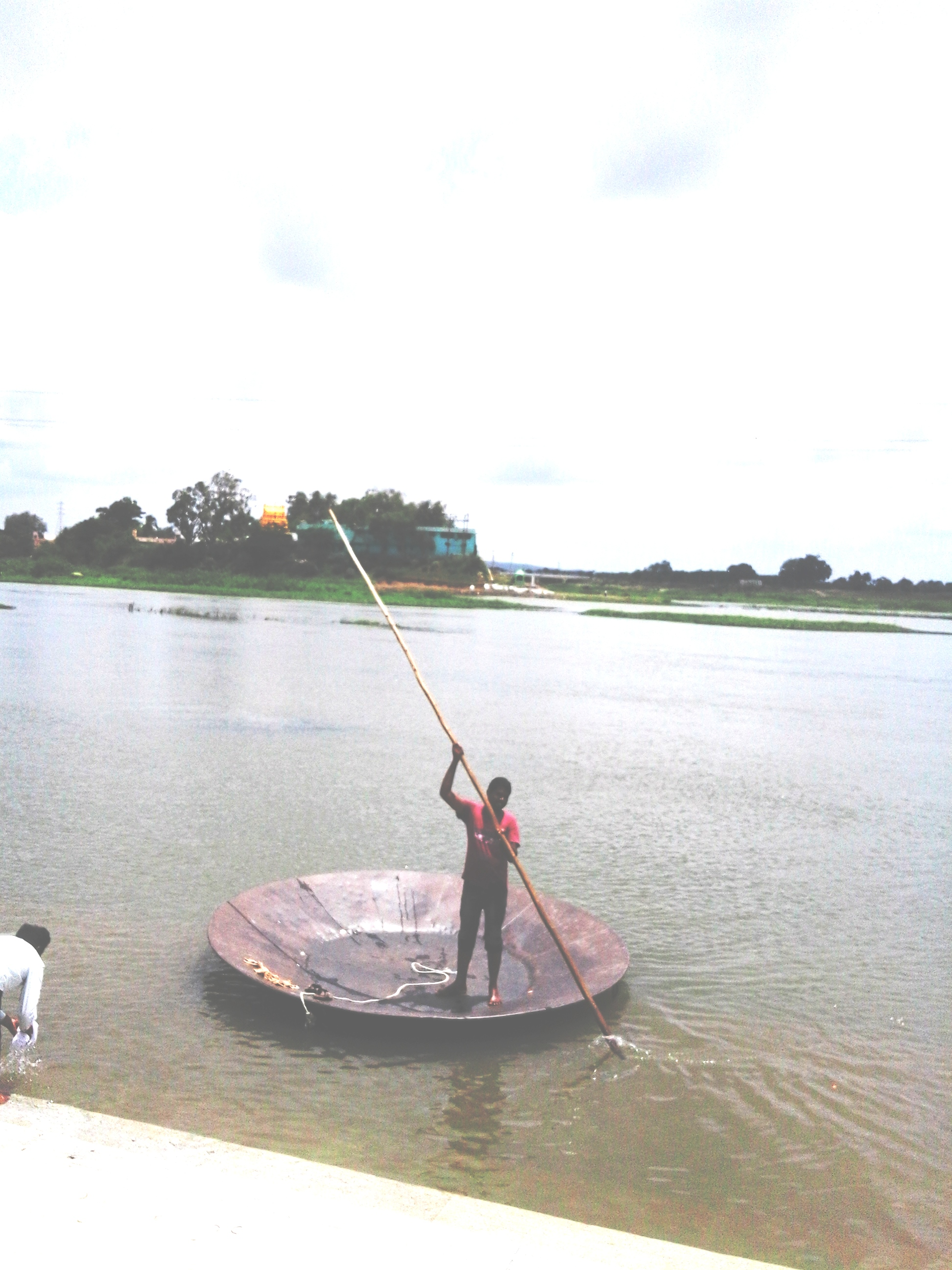
Temple Coracle at T.Narasipura Bypass Junction

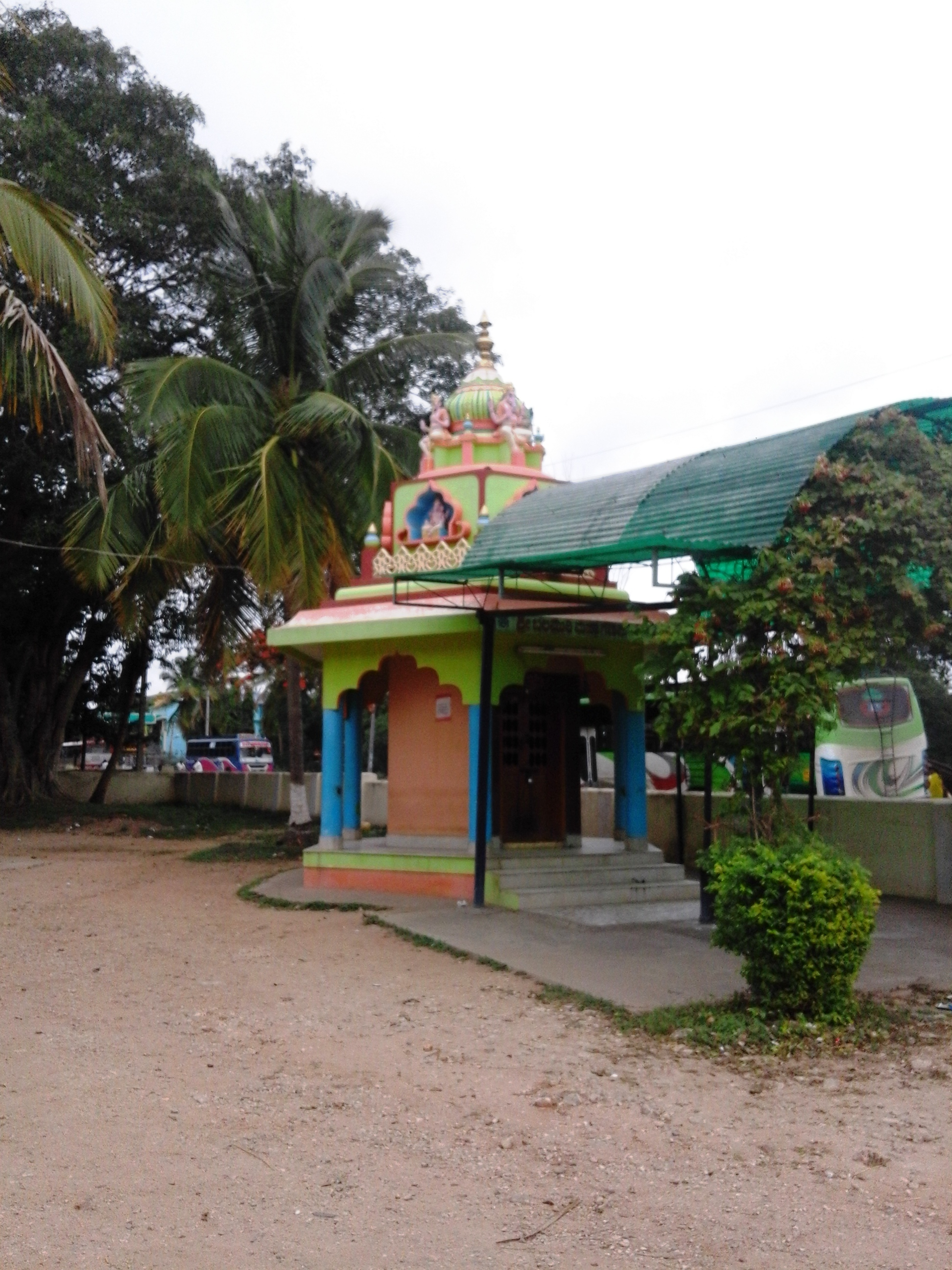
Ganapathy Temple near Vidyodaya college

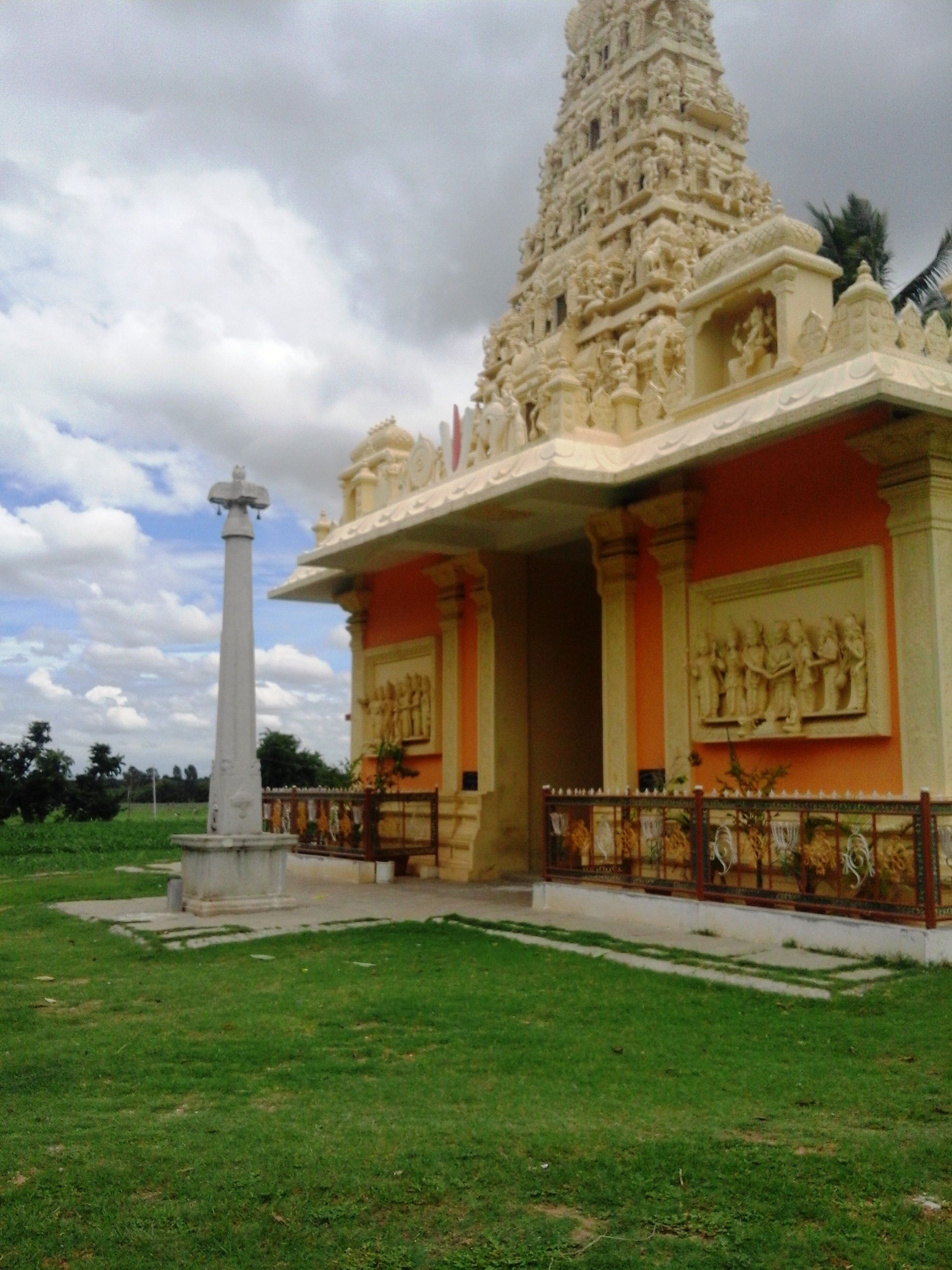
Sosale Devasthana
