= Kulavadhu =

- Directed by: T. V. Singh Takur
- Written by: Krishnamoorthy Puranik (Based on Novel Kulavadhu)
- Screenplay by: Shilashree Sahithya Vrunda
- Produced by: A. C. Narasimha Murthy & Friends
- Starring: Rajkumar; Leelavathi; Balakrishna; Narasimharaju; K. S. Ashwath
- Cinematography: B. Dorairaj
- Edited by: Venkatram; Raghupathi
- Music by: G. K. Venkatesh
- Production company: Shailashree Productions
- Distributed by: Shailashree Productions
- Release date: 21 May 1963
- Running time: 132 min
- Country: India
- Language: Kannada

Kulavadhu is a 1963 Indian Kannada-language film, directed by T. V. Singh Takur and produced by A. C. Narasimha Murthy & Friends. The film stars Rajkumar, Leelavathi, Balakrishna, Narasimharaju and K. S. Ashwath. The film has musical score by G. K. Venkatesh. The famous Ugadi song Yuga Yugadi Kaledaru from this movie is a still hit song. The movie is based on the novel of same name by Krishnamoorthy Puranik. This was Rajkumar's second movie to be based on a novel - the first being Karuneye Kutumbada Kannu (1962). Both the movies were based on novels by Krishnamoorthy Puranik.

== Cast ==
- Rajkumar
- Balakrishna
- Narasimharaju
- K. S. Ashwath
- Venkatasubbaiah
- Ashwath Narayana
- Aadishesh
- Shenoy
- Kuppuraj
- Raman
- Bhujanga Rao
- Basappa
- Master Udayashankar
- Leelavathi
- B. Jayashree
- Papamma
- Sharadamma
- Sadhana (Revathidevi)

== Soundtrack ==
The music was composed by G. K. Venkatesh.

| No. | Song | Singers | Lyrics | Length (m:ss) |
|---|---|---|---|---|
| 1 | "Emma Maneyangaladi" | S. Janaki | V. Seetharamaiah | 03:44 |
| 2 | "Thaye Bara Mogava" | S. Janaki | M. Govinda Pai | |
| 3 | "Yuga Ugaadi Kaledaro" | S. Janaki | D. R. Bendre | 02:45 |
| 4 | "Olavina Priyalate" | P. B. Srinivas | Kanagal Prabhakar Shastry | 03:34 |
