= Narayanaghatta =

Village in Bangalore Urban district, India

Narayana Ghatta is a village in Anekal Taluk, Muthanallur panchayat, Sarjapura Hobli, Bangalore, India. The village has a population of around 2,500. and it is close to Electronic city
