= Agasa Thimmanahalli =

- village
- Agasa Thimmanahalli is in Bangalore district
- Interactive map of Agasa Thimmanahalli
- Coordinates: 12.7101°N 77.6616°E
- Country: India
- State: Karnataka
- District: Bangalore
- Talukas: Anekal

Government
  - Body: Village Panchayat

Languages
  - Official: Kannada
- Time zone: UTC+5:30 (IST)
- PIN: 562 106
- Nearest city: Bangalore
- Civic agency: Village Panchayat

Agasa Thimmanahalli is a village in the southern state of Karnataka, India. It is located in the Anekal taluk of Bangalore urban district in Karnataka.

== Demographics ==
As of 2011 India census, Agasa Thimmanahalli had a population of 22. Males constitute 14 of the population and females 8. Kannada is the official and most widely spoken language in Agasa Thimmanahalli. Agasa Thimmanahalli has an average literacy rate of 68.18 percent, higher than the national average of 59.5 percent, with 71.43 percent of the males and 62.50 percent of females literate.
