= Maragondahalli =

- census town
- Country: India
- State: Karnataka
- District: Bangalore

Population (2011)
  - Total: 8,824

Languages
  - Official: Kannada
- Time zone: UTC+5:30 (IST)

Maragondahalli is a census town in the southern state of Karnataka, India. It is located in the Anekal taluk of Bangalore Urban district.

== Demographics ==
As of 2011 India census, Maragondahalli had a population of 3014. Males constitute 1557 of the population and females 1457. Kannada is the official and most widely spoken language in Maragondahalli. Maragondahalli has an average literacy rate of 77 percent, higher than the national average of 59.5 percent.
