= Aravantigepura =

- place
- Country: India
- State: Karnataka
- District: Bangalore

Population (2011)
  - Total: 247

Languages
  - Official: Kannada
- Time zone: UTC+5:30 (IST)
- PIN: 562 106

Aravantigepura is a village in the outskirts of Anekal town in the southern state of Karnataka, India. It is located in the Anekal taluk of Bangalore Urban district.
