= Thayiya Madilalli =

- VCD cover
- ತಾಯಿಯ ಮಡಿಲಲ್ಲಿ
- Directed by: B. Subba Rao
- Written by: Chi. Udaya Shankar (dialogues)
- Screenplay by: M. D. Sundar
- Story by: A. L. Abbaiah Naidu
- Produced by: A. L. Abbaiah Naidu
- Starring: Aarathi; Ashok
- Cinematography: R. Chittibabu
- Edited by: P. Bhakthavathsalam
- Music by: Satyam
- Production company: Madhu Art Films
- Distributed by: Madhu Art Films
- Release date: 16 February 1981
- Running time: 153 minutes
- Country: India
- Language: Kannada

Thayiya Madilalli is a 1981 Indian Kannada-language film directed by B. Subba Rao and produced by A. L. Abbaiah Naidu. The film stars Ashok, Aarathi, Udaykumar and Balakrishna. The musical score was composed by Satyam. Aarathi and Ashok, who played a brother-sister duo for the second time in this film (the first being Pavana Ganga), were a popular romantic pair of the time. Even though the movie failed to complete 100 days run in Bangalore, the movie achieved a rare feat of having completed a year long run in Bijapur (Jayshree theatre).

== Plot ==
Ramiah, a poor man, leads a happy and content life. However, his peaceful existence is shattered when a malevolent criminal disrupts his family, causing the untimely deaths of both Ramiah and his beloved wife. Filled with anguish and a burning desire for vengeance, their son Raghav embarks on a perilous journey to confront the wrongdoer and restore justice for his parents' tragic fate.

== Cast ==
- Aarathi as Ganga
- Ashok as Raghu
- Shankar Nag as Ravi (cameo)
- Varnashri
- Udaykumar
- Udayakumar as Inspector Vishwanathayya
- Balakrishna as Ramayya
- Leelavathi as Seethamma
- Tiger Prabhakar
- Shylashri
- Halam
- Comedian Guggu as Sidda

== Soundtrack ==
The music was composed by Satyam.

No.	Song	Singers	Lyrics	Length (m:ss)
1	"Allondu Loka"	P. Susheela	Chi. Udaya Shankar	04:44
2	"Amma Neenu"	S. Janaki, S. P. Balasubrahmanyam	Chi. Udaya Shankar	04:18
3	"Andagaara"	S. Janaki, S. P. Balasubrahmanyam	Chi. Udaya Shankar	04:16
4	"Yenendu Haadali"	S. Janaki, S. P. Balasubrahmanyam	Chi. Udaya Shankar	04:28
5	"Kannadada Ravi"	S. P. Balasubrahmanyam, S. Janaki	C. V. ShivaShankar	04:47
