= Ali Bommasandra =

HaleBommasandra
- village
- Country: India
- State: Karnataka
- District: Bangalore

Population (2011)
  - Total: 700

Languages
  - Official: Kannada
- Time zone: UTC+5:30 (IST)
- PIN: 560 099

Ali Bommasandra is a village in the southern state of Karnataka, India. It is located in the Anekal taluk of Bangalore Urban district.
