= Halunda Tavaru =

- DVD cover
- Directed by: D. Rajendra Babu
- Written by: Richard Louis (dialogues); D. Rajendra Babu (dialogues)
- Screenplay by: D. Rajendra Babu
- Based on: Haalunda Thavaru by Krishnamoorthy Puranik
- Produced by: Vizag Raju
- Starring: Vishnuvardhan; Sithara
- Cinematography: Ashok Cashyap
- Edited by: K. Balu
- Music by: Hamsalekha
- Production company: D. R. Pictures
- Distributed by: Ramu Films
- Release date: 5 August 1994
- Running time: 145 minutes
- Language: Kannada

Halunda Tavaru is a 1994 Indian Kannada-language drama film starring Vishnuvardhan and Sithara. It was directed by D. Rajendra Babu and produced by Vizag Raju. The music and lyrics were written and composed by Hamsalekha. It was commercially successful and completed 25 weeks in many theaters. It is based on a novel of the same name by Krishnamoorthy Puranik. The film was remade in Telugu as Puttinti Gowravam.

== Plot ==
The story revolves around a couple who are brought up in contrasting financial situations and how they undergo the riches to rags transition in life. The film was tagged as a tragedy drama with the lead protagonists dying towards the climax.

== Cast ==
- Vishnuvardhan as Siddharth
- Sithara as Jyoti
- Pandari Bai as Jyoti's mother
- Srinivasa Murthy as Jyoti's brother
- Rajanand
- Krishnegowda as Jyoti's father
- Pramila Joshai
- Gayathri Prabhakar
- Sanketh Kashi
- Ashalatha

== Production ==
After Karulina Koogu, Rajendra Babu who was on look out for a story appealing female audience decided to adapt the novel Halunda Thavaru by Krishnamurthy Puranik into a film of same name. He originally approached Dr. Rajkumar for the lead role who refused the offer as he felt it was unsuitable for this age. Sudharani was originally chosen for the role of Sitara however she left the film due to a surgery.

== Soundtrack ==
Soundtrack was composed by Hamsalekha.

- "Elu Shiva" - K. S. Chitra
- "Ele Hombisile" - K. S. Chitra, S. P. Balasubrahmanyam
- "Olavina Runava" - K. S. Chitra, S. P. Balasubrahmanyam
- "Ee Dharege" - K. S. Chitra, S. P. Balasubrahmanyam
- "Thaayiney Illadantha" - Mano
- "Haalunda Tavarannu" - S. Janaki

== Release ==
It was the first film to be distributed by H. D. Kumaraswamy.

== Awards ==
- Karnataka State Film Award for Best Music Director - Hamsalekha
- Filmfare Award for Best Music Director - Hamsalekha
- Filmfare Award for Best Actor - Vishnuvardhan
