= Ashok (Kannada actor) =

Indian Kannada film actor

- Born: 12 September 1951 (age 75); Anekal, Mysore State (present–day Karnataka), India
- Occupation: Actor

Ashok (born 12 September 1951) is an Indian actor in the Kannada film industry, primarily in romantic and dramatic roles during the late 1970s and 1980s. He made his acting debut in 1975 with the film Hennu Samsarada Kannu, where Sridevi in a small role played his romantic lead which marked the beginning of a prolific career spanning over five decades.

Ashok rose to prominence with critically acclaimed performances in films such as Sanaadi Appanna (1977), directed by Vijay, and Bayalu Daari (1977) by the Dorai–Bhagavan duo. He went on to star alongside leading actresses Aarathi and Manjula in several films after that. His role in Ranganayaki (1981), directed by Puttanna Kanagal, is considered one of his finest, earning him recognition for his nuanced portrayal of a complex gray-shaded character.

Ashok has appeared in several landmark films, including Archana (1982), Chellida Rakta (1982), Thayiya Madilalli (1981), Raja Maharaja (1983), and Kranthiyogi Basavanna (1983). He was widely appreciated for his ability to balance romantic leads with socially relevant roles. In addition to acting, Ashok served as the founding president of the Karnataka Film Artists, Workers and Technicians Union in 1986 and actively participated in cultural and social movements such as the Gokak agitation and Raitha Sangha protests. Ashok’s career spans five decades, with over 200 films, earning him recognition as one of Kannada cinema’s most enduring and versatile actors. His contributions earned him several accolades and honorary recognitions over the years.

== Early life ==
Ashok was born to V. Lakshminarasimhaiah, a police inspector and Puttamma in Anekal. From a young age, he aspired to become a film star. After completing his degree, he applied to the National School of Drama (NSD), the Film and Television Institute of India (FTII), Pune, and the Madras Film Institute. He was admitted to the Madras Film Institute, where he completed his course.Before entering films, Ashok participated in stage plays and was actively involved in cultural programs during his college years. He also appeared in television dramas, which helped him gain early exposure and refine his acting skills before making his big-screen debut.

== Career ==
=== 1975: Debut ===
Ashok made his acting debut in Hennu Samsarada Kannu (1975), in a supporting role with Sridevi playing his romantic lead, that was directed by A. V. Sheshagiri Rao. The critics noted his “fresh screen presence and expressive acting” marking him as a promising newcomer.

=== 1977: Breakthrough Year ===
Ashok rose to prominence with multiple hits such as Sanaadi Appanna, directed by Vijay, based on Krishnamoorthy Puranik’s novel playing Rajkumar's son where his portrayal of Hanumanthu was praised for its emotional depth, Bayalu Daari, directed by the Dorai–Bhagavan duo, where he played Kalpana's brother, Bhagyavantharu directed by H. R. Bhargava and Pavana Ganga directed by Y. R. Swamy, family melodramas where critics appreciated his versatility.

=== 1980s: Acclaimed Performance in Romantic and Social Dramas ===
Ashok delivered one of his finest performances in Ranganayaki, directed by Puttanna Kanagal co-starring Aarathi, Ambarish, and Ramakrishna. Based on Ashwattha’s novel, the film explored complex themes of morality and relationships. Critics hailed Ashok’s portrayal of Nagaraj Shetty as “intense and layered,” cementing his reputation as a serious actor. He appeared in Archana (1982) and Chellida Raktha, showcasing his romantic hero image. In Kranthiyogi Basavanna (1983), directed by K. S. L. Swamy, Ashok played the titular role alongside Aarathi and Manjula, earning praise for his dignified portrayal of the social reformer Basavanna. Films like Mugila Mallige directed by K. Balachander and a string of hit films with top heroine Aarathi reinforced his romantic and family drama credentials. Critics described him as “the quintessential gentleman hero" of Kannada cinema.

=== 1990s: Transition to Character Roles ===
In the 90s Ashok shifted to supporting and character roles in films such as Thumbida Mane (1995, dir. S. Umesh), Mutthinantha Hendathi (1995) and Janumada Jodi (1998), a blockbuster family drama where his performance as a father figure was well-received.

=== 2000s-2020s: Senior roles ===
He featured in major hits like Appu (2002, dir. Puri Jagannadh), playing a police officer, Dakota Express (2002) and Kutumba (2003), where critics praised his “commanding screen presence” in paternal roles. He continued to appear in prominent films: Kempe Gowda (2011), Maanikya (2014), Mr. Airavata (2015), and Shivalinga (2016), often portraying influential father figures.

Recent appearances include Raajakumara (2017), Ombattane Dikku (2022), Aachar & Co (2023) and Krishnam Pranaya Sakhi (2024), where critics lauded his “graceful adaptation to senior roles”.

== Filmography ==
Following list is Incomplete.

Year	Title	Role	Notes
1975	Hennu Samsarada Kannu		
1976	Vijaya Vani		
1976	Sutrada Bombe		
1976	Geddavalu Naane		
1977	Sanaadi Appanna	Hanumanthu	
1977	Bayalu Daari	Raja	
1977	Deepa		
1977	Bhagyavantharu	Ramu	
1977	Pavana Ganga	Narasimhan	
1977	Kumkuma Rakshe		
1977	Ondu Premada Kathe	Chandrashekhar Rao	
1978	Madhura Sangama	Vikram	
1979	Mallige Sampige		
1979	Maralu Sarapani		
1980	Rama Lakshmana		
1980	Kappu Kola	Manju	
1980	Varadakshine		
1981	Ranganayaki	Nagaraj Shetty	
1981	Ganeshana Mahime		
1981	Thayiya Madilalli	Raghu	
1981	Rajeshwari		
1981	Balu Bangara		
1982	Archana	Gopalakrishna	
1982	Kannu Teresida Hennu	Ravi	
1982	Chellida Raktha		
1983	Kranthiyogi Basavanna	Basavanna	
1983	Raja Maharaja		
1983	Manege Banda Mahalakshmi		
1984	Hennina Sowbhagya	Ramu	
1984	Shapatha		
1985	Mugila Mallige		
1985	Mavano Alliyano		
1985	Kalyana Agathigal	Robert	Tamil films
1986	Oru Manithan Oru Manaivi		Tamil films
1993	Valli	Shekar's father	Tamil films
1995	Thumbida Mane		
1995	Mutthinantha Hendathi		
1998	Janumada Jodi	Ramanna	
2001	Jipuna Nanna Ganda		
2002	Dakota Express	Rajashekhar Patil	
2002	Appu	Sub-inspector Sudarshan	
2004	Srusti		
2012	Prarthane		
2014	Kempe Gowda	Kempe Gowda's father	
2014	Maanikya	Ugrappa	
2014	Gajakesari		
2014	Tirupathi Express	Srinivas Rao	
2015	Rana Vikrama		
2015	Mr. Airavata		
2016	Parapancha		
2016	Shivalinga	Vishwanath	
2017	Raajakumara	Murthy	
2019	Adyaksha in America	Ullas' father	
2022	Ombattane Dikku	Vasu	
2023	Aachar & Co	Madhusudhan Aachar	
2024	Krishnam Pranaya Sakhi		
2025	GST		
