= Sanaadi Appanna =

- Poster
- Directed by: Vijay
- Written by: Krishnamoorthy Puranik
- Screenplay by: Chi. Udaya Shankar
- Based on: Kuniyitu Hejje Naliyithu Gejje by Krishnamoorthy Puranik
- Produced by: Saraswathi Srinivas; V. S. Murali
- Starring: Rajkumar; Jaya Prada
- Cinematography: R. Chittibabu
- Edited by: P. Bhaktavatsalam
- Music by: G. K. Venkatesh
- Distributed by: Anandalakshmi Enterprises
- Release date: August 1977
- Running time: 170 minutes
- Country: India
- Language: Kannada

Sanaadi Appanna is a 1977 Indian Kannada-language musical film directed by Vijay based on the novel Kuniyitu Hejje Naliyithu Gejje by Krishnamoorthy Puranik which was loosely based on the life of Bagalkote shehnai player Appanna (1876-1945). The film starred Rajkumar in title role with Jaya Prada in the lead role along with Ashok, Balakrishna, R. Sampath, Thoogudeepa Srinivas, Papamma and Baby Madhavi in supporting roles. Puneeth Rajkumar made a brief appearance in one of the songs of this film.

The film is considered a landmark in Kannada cinema. It is notable for the fact that Bismillah Khan played the actual shehnai for Rajkumar's character in this movie. The film was remade in Telugu as Sannayi Appanna (1980) starring Sobhan Babu. It saw a theatrical run of 50 weeks.

== Cast ==
- Dr. Rajkumar as Appanna
- Jaya Prada as Basanthi
- Ashok as Hanumanthu, Appanna's son
- Suma as Hanumanthu/Rao's wife
- Balakrishna as Ayyanna
- Sampath, Appanna's uncle
- Thoogudeepa Srinivas as Shivaraya
- Baby Madhavi
- Papamma as Akkamma
- Shivaprakash
- K. Venkataraju
- Bhatti Mahadevappa
- Joker Shyam as Thammayya
- Honnavalli Krishna as Apashruthi Ayyanna's son
- Puneeth Rajkumar as young Hanmanthu

== Production ==
Sanaadi translates to shehnai in the Kannada language. The films deals with the life of a rural shehnai artiste Appannna (played by Rajkumar). In early 1977, Bismillah Khan flew from Varanasi with his ten-member troupe to Prasad Studios in Madras (now Chennai) and spent nine days working on the film.

== Soundtrack ==
Sanaadi Appanna

Soundtrack album by G. K. Venkatesh
- Released: 1977
- Genre: Feature film soundtrack
- Length: 35:18
- Label: Saregama

The background score for the film and soundtrack were composed by G. K. Venkatesh. The soundtrack album consists of seven tracks, which includes a Shehnai solo played by Bismillah Khan.

Track list
No.	Title	Lyrics	Artist(s)	Length
1.	"Naane Thaayi Naane Thande"	Chi. Udaya Shankar	P. B. Sreenivas	6:05
2.	"Shehanoi Music Bit"		Bismillah Khan	3:03
3.	"Raaga Anuraaga"	Chi. Udaya Shankar	Rajkumar, S. Janaki	4:23
4.	"Ninagaagi Ododi Bande"	Chi. Udaya Shankar	Rajkumar	5:08
5.	"Shennai With Dialogues Raga Marwe"		Bismillah Khan	4:42
6.	"Karedaru Kelade"	Chi. Udaya Shankar	S. Janaki	6:58
7.	"Shennai With Diloguos Raga Sindhubhaira"		Bismillah Khan	4:59
Total length:				35:18

== Release, reception and legacy ==
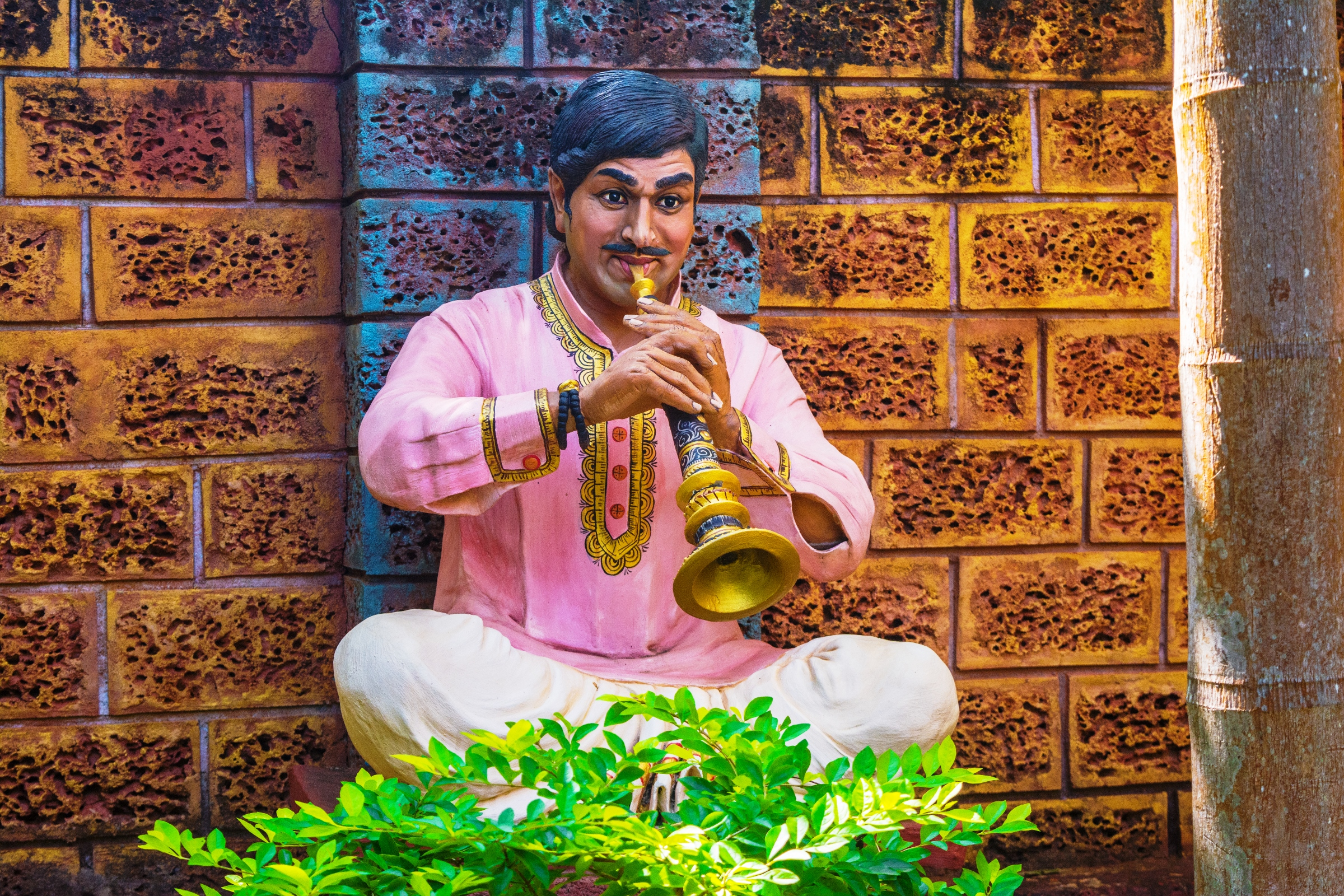
A Dr. Rajkumar statue which features him as Appanna from the film

The film made its theatrical release in August 1977. It completed a 100-day run in many centers across Karnataka. In the last week of November 1977, during the centenary day celebration at the Urvashi Theatre in Bangalore, Rajkumar paid tribute to Bismillah Khan saying, "I just acted in the role but Ustad Bismillah Khan is the real soul of the film. He gave life to the character I played in the film."

It has been reported that to master the shehnai-wielding technique, Dr. Rajkumar cancelled all his shooting schedules for a month. The elan with which he handles the instrument in the film is commendable. At no point does he ever resort to exaggerated gestures — quite a contrast to Sivaji Ganeshan, who plays the nadaswaram player in Thillana Mohanambal. By the end of it, Khansaheb and Rajkumar had become close friends. When the film completed its 50-week run, Khansaheb came for the celebrations here. "You have handled the shehnai to such perfection that it seemed as if you were really playing it!" the maestro complimented Rajkumar.

== Awards ==
- Karnataka State Film Award for Best Child Actor (Female) (1977) - Baby Madhavi
