= Marasuru Madivala inscriptions and hero stones =

Village in Karnataka, India

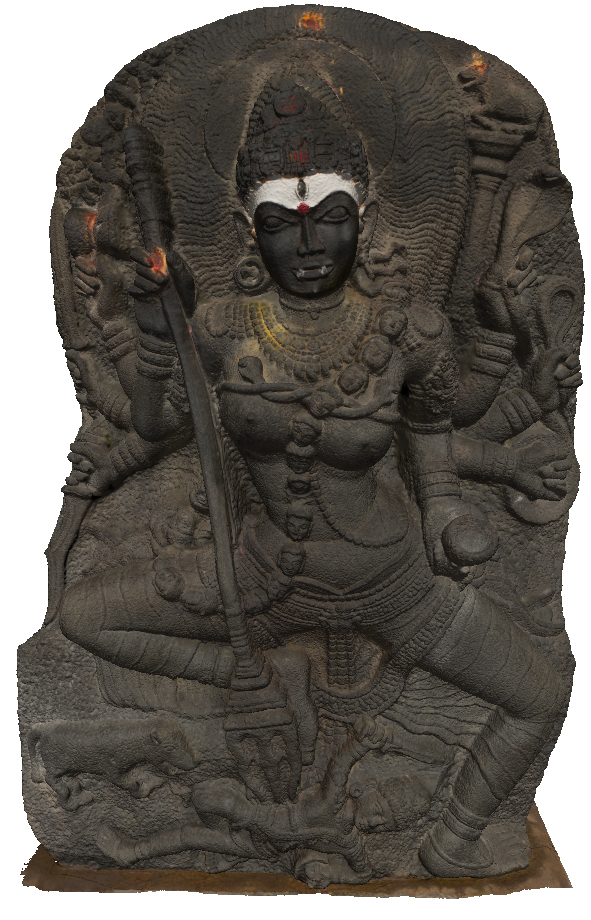
Digital Image of 9-10th Century Chamundi at Marasur Madivala. Picture Courtesy: Wikimedia Commons

Marasuru Madivala is a village in Anekal Taluk of Bengaluru, in the Indian state of Karnataka. It is a historical settlement with a millennium-long history. Its significance lies in the discovery of a herostone-inscription and an ornate sculpture of Chamundi found in the village. It is housed in a new mantapa. It is home to a 10th-century Someshwara temple, and a modern-day Nandi mantapa restored with 8th-century Ganga style stone pillars, Sati stones, hero-stones and ancient Jaina idols.

== Hero-stones ==
=== 9th-century Puniseyamma ===
The herostone inscription is in Kannada. It was dated paleographically to the 9th century CE, it records the death of Puniyasemma Gamunda. However, the reason for his death is not known. The inscription was discovered by the Mythic Society Bengaluru Inscriptions 3D Digital Conservation Project team.

Puniseyamma Hero-stone
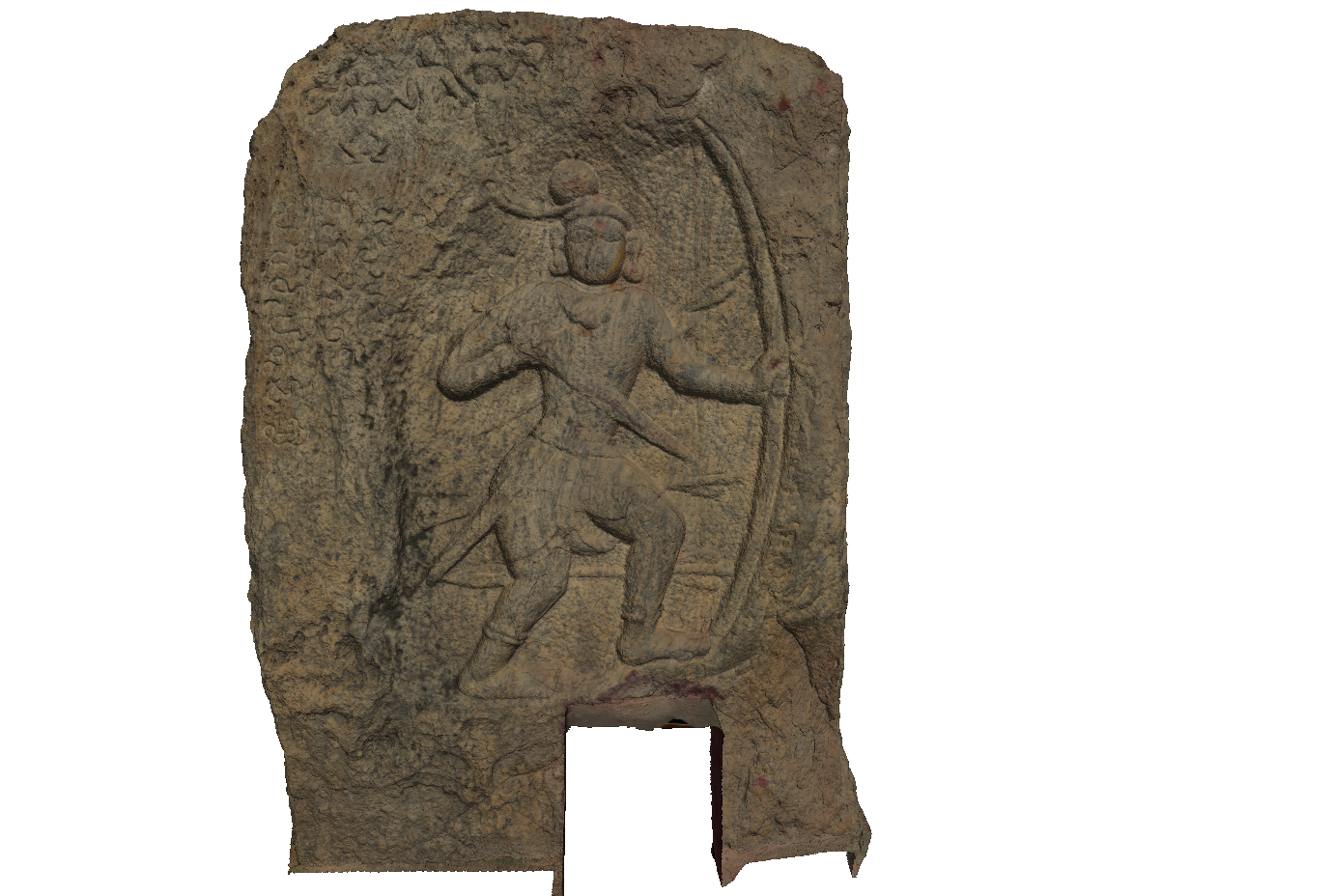
- Digital Image of The Marasuru Madivala 9th-century Puniseyamma Hero-stone
- Material: Stone
- Height: 140 cm (55 in)
- Width: 97 cm (38 in)
- Writing: Kannada script
- Discovered: Marasuru madivala, Anekal Taluk, Bengaluru
- Present location: 12.76165278°N 77.72380833°E
- Language: Kannada

Transliteration
Line Number	Kannada	IAST
1	ಪುಣಿಸೆಯ	puṇiseya
2	ಮ್ಮ ಗಾವು	mma gāvu
3	ಣ್ಡನು ದ.	ṇḍanu da.
4	.ಸತ.	sata
5	ರೂಗ ತೋ	rūga to
6	ರು ವದು	ru vadu

=== 10th-century Butuga "Irivabedenga" ===
Butuga "Irivabedenga" Hero-stone
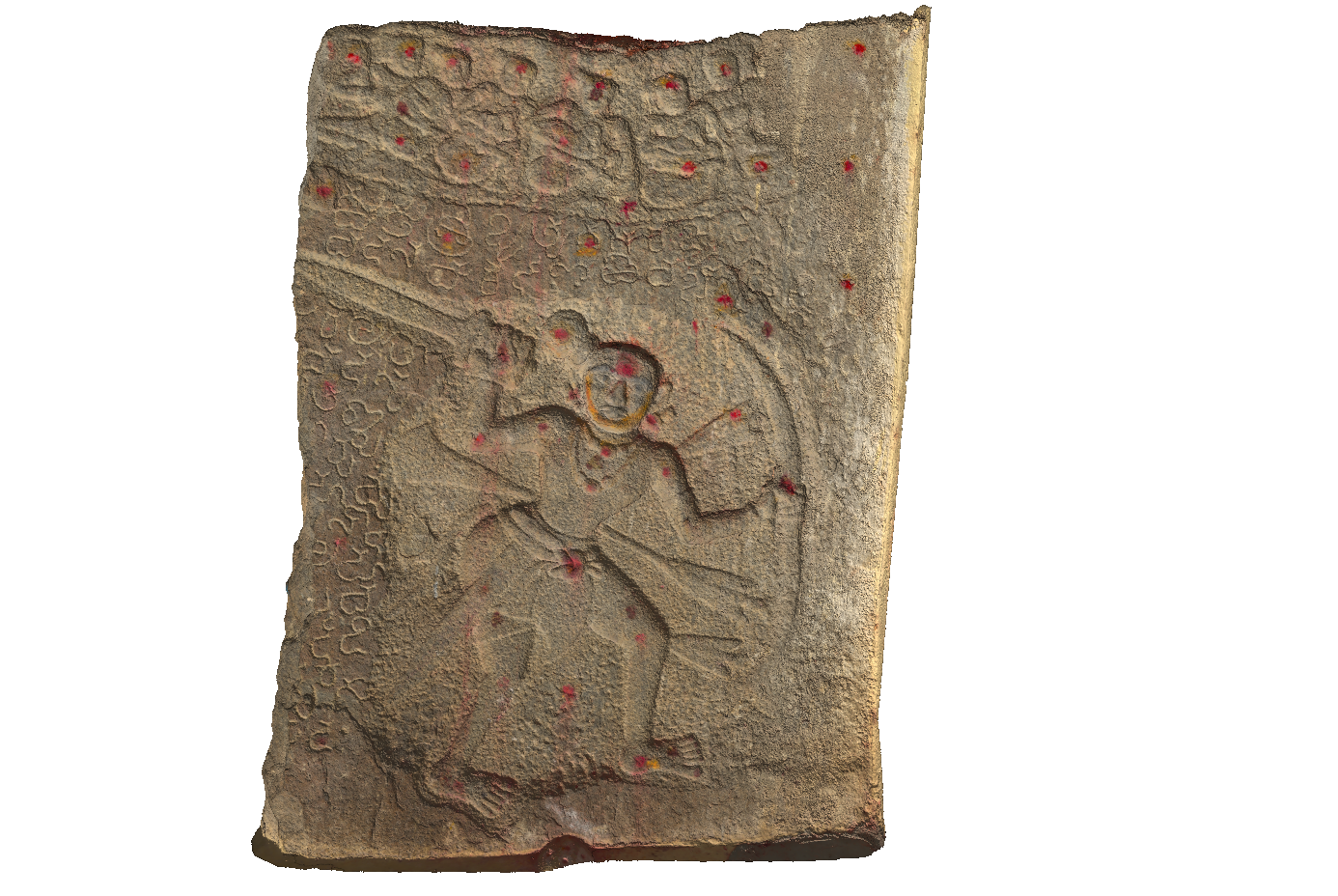
- Digital Image of the Marasuru Madivala 10th-century Butuga "Irivabedenga" Hero-stone
- Material: Stone
- Height: 131 cm (52 in)
- Width: 98 cm (39 in)
- Writing: Kannada script
- Present location: 12.76165278°N 77.72380833°E
- Language: Kannada

The inscription is in Kannada. It was dated paleographically to the 10th century CE. The stone has a sculpture of a hero called Irivabedenga, he holds a bow in one hand and a dagger in the other. The inscription text is worn out; its full context cannot be deciphered. The inscription mentions Butuga and Irivabedenga. Butuga was a Ganga king who ruled between 938 CE-961 CE in this region. Irivabedenga was a term used for an expert warrior (vide - Kannada Sahitya Parishat Kannada Nigantu).

Transliteration
Line Number	Kannada	IAST
1	ಸ್ವಸ್ತಿಶ್ರೀ ಬುತುಗನ ರಾಜ್ಯದ(ದೊ) ಳ್ .....	svastiśrī butugana rājyada(d) l .....
2	ವಳನ ಮಕ್ಕಳ್ ಇರಿವಬೆಡೆಙ್ಗ	valana makkal irivabḍṅga
3	. ಕಲತೊ	. . kalato
4	. ವಳ(ದ) ನು	. vala(da) nu
5	. ತ . .	. ta. .
6	. . ರು	. .ru
7	ಹವು	havu
8	ಣ(ನೊ).(ಳ್)	ṇa(n).(l)
9	ಲಹ	laha
10	. ವ(ಚ)	. va(ca)
11	.ಳ್ಕ ದಿ	.lka di
12	. ಸ	. sa

== Chamundi Sculpture ==
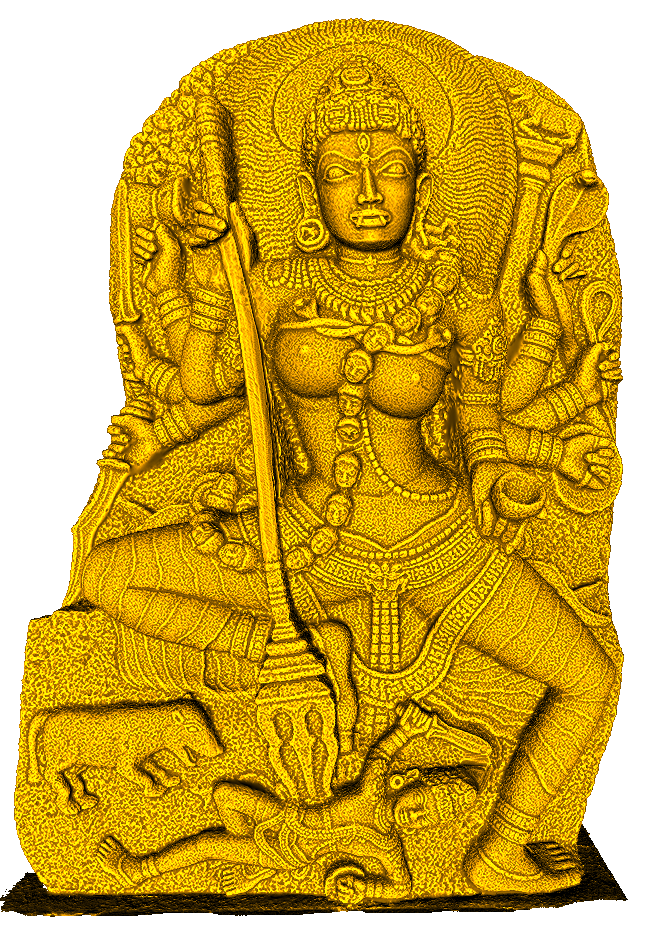
Digital Image Obtained by 3D Scanning of The Marasuru Madivala Chamundi sculpture. Picture Courtesy: Wikimedia Commons

The Chamundi sculpture found in Marasuru Madivala village of Anekal Taluk is one of the most ornate sculptures of the deity in south India. The goddess is depicted with an astabhuja (lit. Eight handed) with a face expressing raudra. She holds a trishula (trident) that pierces a fallen demon, with her other hands holding weapons including a sword, dagger, ankusa, Naga, Damaru, shield, and skull cup. She wears a Yajnopavita (sacred thread) of skulls. Her breasts are held by serpents depicted with two protruding fangs. These characteristics indicate the ferocious and wild nature of the goddess. She is also depicted with a sengol, ascribing royalty to the goddess as a mark of devotion and respect.

== Gallery ==
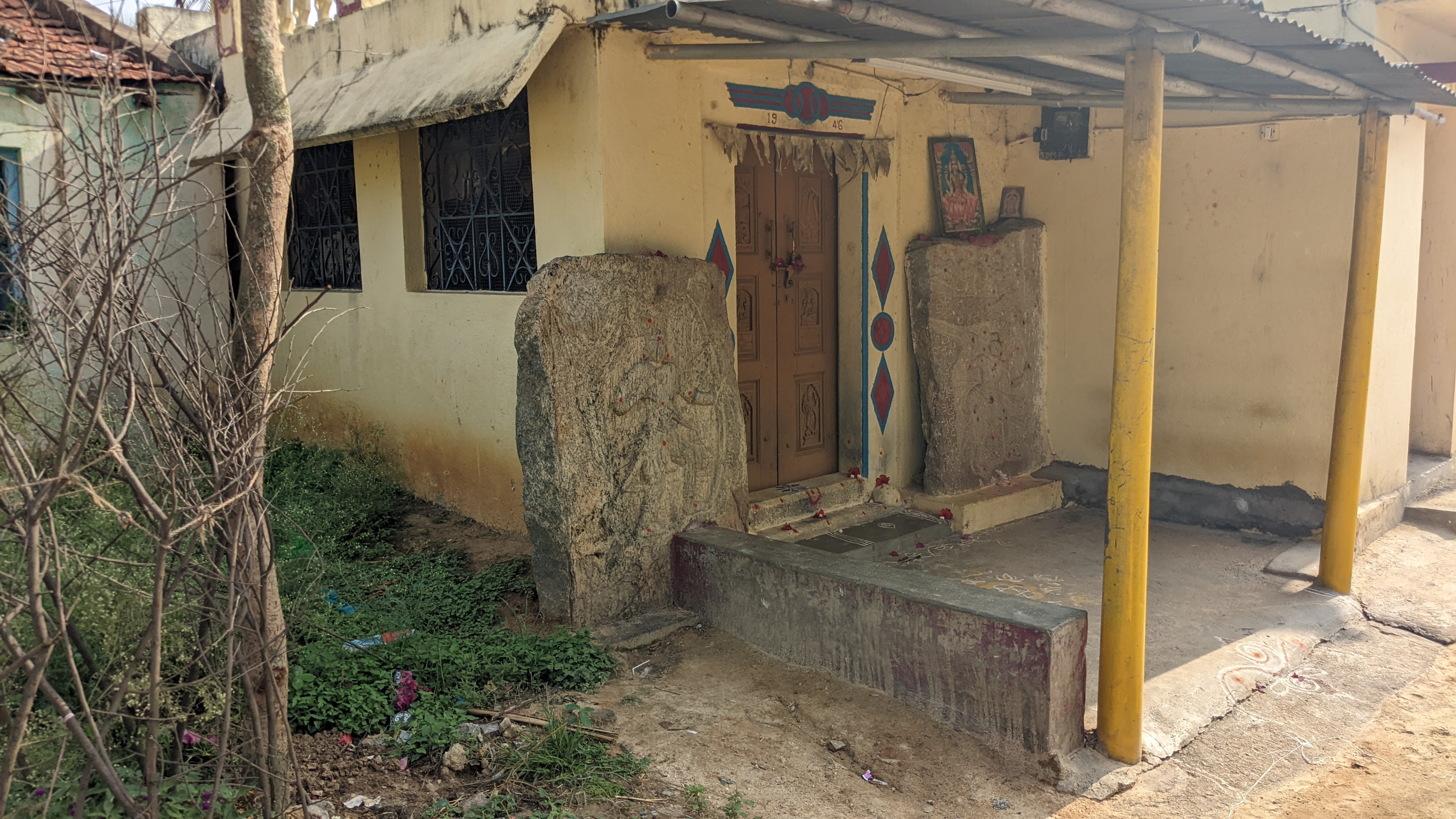
Marasuru Madivala herostones

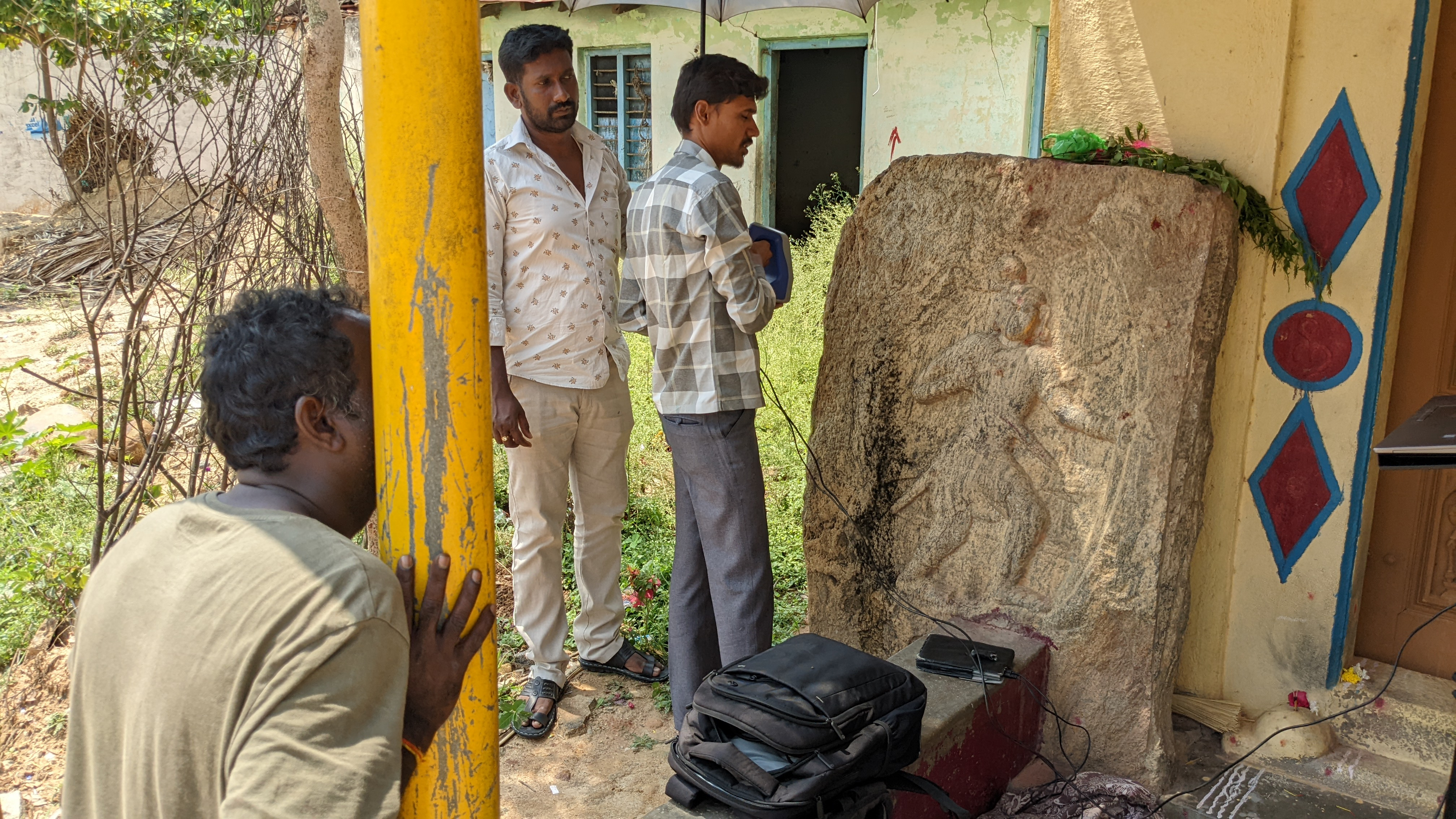
Marasuru Madivala 9th-century Puniseyamma Hero-stone

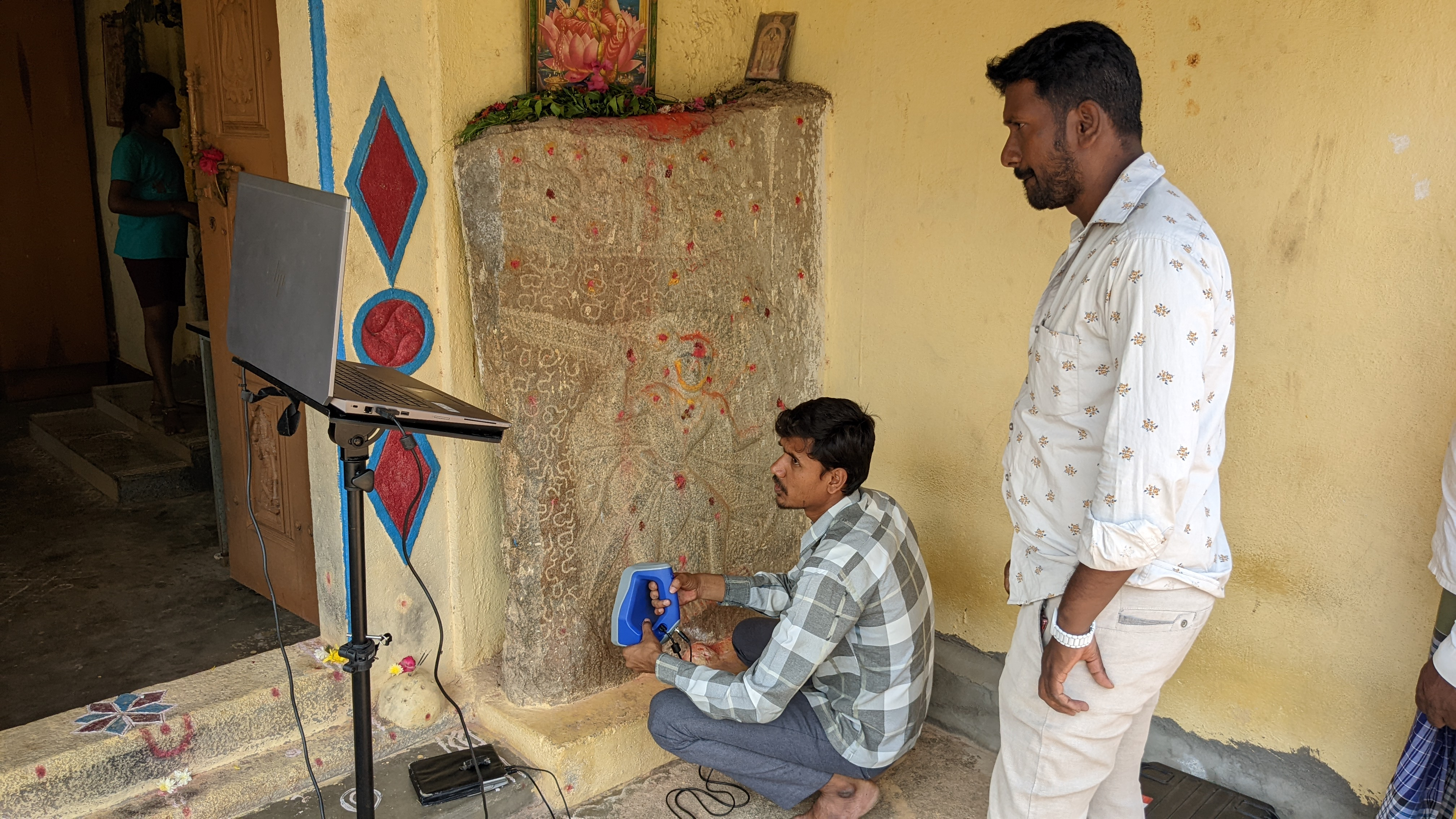
Marasuru Madivala 10th-century Butuga "Irivabedenga" Hero-stone
