= Bayalu Daari =

1976 Kannada film by Dore Bhagawan duo

- Poster
- Directed by: Dorai–Bhagavan
- Written by: Chi. Udayashankar (dialogues)
- Based on: Bayalu Daari by Bharathi Sutha
- Produced by: Dorai–Bhagavan
- Starring: Anant Nag; Kalpana; Ashok
- Cinematography: R. Chittibabu
- Edited by: P. Bhaktavatsalam
- Music by: Rajan–Nagendra
- Production company: Anupam Movies
- Release date: 1976
- Running time: 139 minutes
- Country: India
- Language: Kannada

Bayalu Daari ( transl. Open Way) is a 1976 Indian Kannada-language film directed and produced by the Dorai–Bhagavan duo. It is based on the novel of the same name by Bharathi Sutha. This was the first movie of the director duo without Dr. Rajkumar in the lead. The film starred Anant Nag, Kalpana, and K. S. Ashwath. It was a musical blockbuster with all the songs composed by Rajan–Nagendra considered evergreen hits. Bayalu Daari was the first commercial success for Anant Nag who had earlier done art films and established himself as a leading star in the Kannada cinema with a chocolate hero image. This film was one of the last big hits of Kalpana. The helicopter scenes formed a major highlight of the movie.

== Cast ==
- Kalpana as Chandra
- Anant Nag as Gopinath
- Ashok as Raja
- Padma Kumta as Katyayini
- Jayalakshmi as Indra
- K. S. Ashwath as Madhava Rao
- T. N. Balakrishna as Govinda Rao
- Advani Lakshmi Devi as Savitri
- M. Jayashree as Anusuya
- Upasane Seetharam
- R. Ashwath Narayana
- B. S. Narayana Rao
- Purandara as Hari
- Maithili
- Kokila

== Production ==
Director S. K. Bhagavan of the Dorai–Bhagavan duo had revealed that the movie was initially planned with Rajkumar. However, the idea was dropped because the protagonist seduces the girl before marriage which went against the veteran's star image at the time thus making it first film of the director duo without Rajkumar in the lead. The song "Elliruve Manava Kaaduva" was the first time a helicopter was used for filming over the Chikkamagaluru hills.

== Soundtrack ==
The music was composed by Rajan–Nagendra with lyrics by Chi. Udaya Shankar. All the four songs composed for the film were received extremely well and considered evergreen. The song Kanasalu Neene Manasalu Neene went on to be used in the 1982 Telugu movie Nalugu Stambhalata as Chinukula Rali and 1992 Hindi movie Deewana as Aisi Deewangi. The song Baanallu Neene was used in the 1977 Telugu movie Panthulamma as Sirimalle Neeve. Ilayaraja was the guitar player for this movie.

Track listing
No.	Title	Singer(s)	Length
1.	"Kanasalu Neene Manasalu Neene"	S. P. Balasubrahmanyam, Vani Jairam	3:33
2.	"Elliruve Manava Kaaduva"	S. P. Balasubrahmanyam	4: 31
3.	"Baanallu Neene Bhuviyallu Neene"	S. Janaki	4:26
4.	"Baanallu Neene Bhuviyallu Neene (Sad)"	S. Janaki	4:26

== Awards ==
- Karnataka State Film Award for Best Supporting Actress – Jayalakshmi
