= Shapatha =

- Directed by: Amrutham
- Written by: Rama Narayanan
- Produced by: Rama Narayanan
- Starring: Shankar Nag; Ashok; Vijayalakshmi Singh
- Cinematography: N. K. Viswanathan
- Edited by: Rajakeerthi
- Music by: Shankar–Ganesh
- Production company: Brindavan Productions
- Release date: 12 June 1984
- Country: India
- Language: Kannada

Shapatha (transl. Oath) is a 1984 Indian Kannada-language action film, directed by Amrutham and produced by Ramnarayan. The film stars Shankar Nag, Ambareesh, Ashok, Vijayalakshmi Singh and Nalini. The film was a remake of Tamil film Vengaiyin Maindhan which was released on 9 March 1984.

== Cast ==
- Shankar Nag as Ranga
- Ambareesh as Arjun
- Ashok
- Vijayalakshmi Singh as Usha
- Nalini as Radha
- Pavitra
- Srinivasa Murthy
- Aruna
- Charan Raj
- Master Nithin
- Master Rajesh
- Sudheer
- Musuri Krishnamurthy
- Dinesh
- Bangalore Nagesh
- Jr. Narasimharaju as forest guard
- Lakshman as Bhaskar
- Sathyabhama
