= Karuneye Kutumbada Kannu =

- Directed by: T. V. Singh Takur
- Written by: Chi. Sadasivaiah (dialogues)
- Screenplay by: Shilashree Sahithya Vrunda
- Based on: Dharma Devathe by Krishnamoorthy Puranik
- Produced by: A. C. Narasimha Murthy & Friends
- Starring: Rajkumar; Udaykumar; Balakrishna; Narasimharaju; Leelavathi; Rajasree
- Cinematography: B. Dorairaj
- Edited by: Venkatram; Raghupathi
- Music by: G. K. Venkatesh
- Production company: Shilashree Productions
- Distributed by: Shilashree Productions
- Release date: 16 August 1962
- Country: India
- Language: Kannada

Karuneye Kutumbada Kannu ( transl. Humanity is the eye of a family) is a 1962 Indian Kannada-language film, directed by T. V. Singh Takur and produced by A. C. Narasimha Murthy and Friends. The film stars Rajkumar, Udaykumar, Balakrishna and Narasimharaju, with a musical score composed by G. K. Venkatesh. The film is based on the Kannada novel Dharma Devathe by Krishnamoorthy Puranik and is considered the first Kannada film adaptation from a novel.

== Cast ==
- Rajkumar as Kumar
- Udaykumar as Ranganna
- Balakrishna as Balendra Mohana Kutike
- Narasimharaju as Narasimharaju
- K. S. Ashwath as K. Venkanna
- Rajashankar as Chandrashekhar
- Ganapathi Bhat
- Vijayarao
- Mahalinga Bhagavathar
- Kuppuraj
- Basappa
- Vijaykumar
- Master Udayashankar
- Leelavathi
- Advani Lakshmi Devi
- Harini in a cameo
- M. Jayashree as Suma
- Sharadamma
- Rajasree

== Soundtrack ==
The music was composed by G. K. Venkatesh.

No.	Song	Singers	Lyrics	Length (m:ss)
1	"Ashagana Mohana"	S. Janaki	Kanagal Prabhakara Shastry	03:15
2	"Baramma Guruseve"	S. Janaki		03:21
3	"Jan Jan Kalgejje"	S. Janaki		03:42
4	"Kanneradoo"	P. B. Srinivas		03:59
5	"Nagareekane Ninna"	S. Janaki		05:06
6	"Nijavo Sullo"	S. Janaki, P. B. Srinivas	K. P. Shasthry	04:06
7	"Premagana Thanda"	S. Janaki		02:55
8	Title Song (Instrumental)	Instrumental		02:11
