= Krishnamoorthy Puranik =

- Born: 5 September 1911; Bilagi, Bagalakote, India
- Died: 12 November 1985 (aged 74); Gokak, Karnataka, India
- Occupations: Teacher, writer

Krishnamoorthy Puranik (5 September 1911 – 12 November 1985) was an Indian writer and poet who wrote in Kannada. He was the principal of a government high school in Gokak and was awarded the Karnataka Sahitya Academy Award for his work Mannina Magalu (Daughter of the Soil).

Puranik was born in Bilagi, a village in the Bagalkot district. He was a creative fiction writer. Some of his writings were made into successful Kannada and Tamil movies.

They include Dharma Devate that was made into Karuneye Kutumbada Kannu, Kulavadhu, Kuniyitu Hejje Naliyithu Gejje that was made into Sanaadi Appanna, Muttaide, Mannina Magalu, Pavana Ganga and Halunda Tavaru. Puranik was a poet and also a short story writer.
