= Pavana Ganga =

- Directed by: Y. R. Swamy
- Written by: Krishnamoorthy Puranik (novel)
- Produced by: C. Jayaram
- Starring: Srinath; Aarathi; Ashok
- Cinematography: R. Chittibabu
- Edited by: P. Bhaktavatsalam
- Music by: Rajan–Nagendra
- Production company: Vijaya Vinayaka Enterprises
- Release date: 1977
- Running time: 137 minutes
- Country: India
- Language: Kannada

Pavana Ganga is a 1977 Kannada-language film directed by Y. R. Swamy based on the novel of the same name by Krishnamoorthy Puranik. The film stars Srinath, Aarathi and Ashok. Ashok and Arathi were paired as brother and sister for the first time in their career. They went on to be paired as brother and sister four years later for one more time in Thayiya Madilalli. T. N. Balakrishna, B. Jaya and Dwarakish feature in supporting roles. The film follows a woman's (Aarathi) long journey of sacrifice and resilience as she navigates poverty, family obligations and unfulfilled love.

The film was produced by C. Jayaram under the banner Vijaya Vinayaka Enterprises, with music composed by the duo Rajan–Nagendra, cinematography by R. Chittibabu and editing by P. Bhaktavatsalam. The film's soundtrack, particularly the track "Aakasha Deepavu Neenu" became popular.

== Plot ==
Ganga lives with her widowed father and younger brother Narasimhan in their ancestral village, under the same roof as her uncle Sampanna's family. Before his death, Ganga's father entrusts her with the responsibility of caring for Narasimhan and ensuring that he receives a proper education. After his death, Ganga and her brother are subjected to neglect and humiliation by their aunt Seetha. Achyutha, Seetha's brother, steals the family's savings and jewellery. Determined to build a better future, Ganga leaves for Bangalore with Narasimhan. She works first as a domestic help and later in a garment factory, using her earnings to educate her brother. Through years of sacrifice, Narasimhan excels academically, eventually earning postgraduate qualifications and securing a position as a lecturer.

During Narasimhan's college years, he befriends Annayya, an older student from a wealthy family who repeatedly fails his examinations but possesses a kind and generous nature. Annayya gradually develops feelings for Ganga, and the affection appears to be mutual, though neither openly expresses it. However, Annayya's father arranges his marriage to Champa, the daughter of his wealthy friend. When Annayya confides his distress to Narasimhan, Ganga overhears the conversation and advises him to obey his father's wishes. Believing that Ganga does not reciprocate his feelings, Annayya proceeds with the marriage. Meanwhile, Narasimhan falls in love with his classmate Yamuna, the daughter of his college's owner. Despite wishing to see Ganga married first, he agrees to marry Yamuna at her insistence.

After marriage, tensions arise within Narasimhan's household as Yamuna develops resentment toward Ganga's presence, often belittling her for her humble background and unmarried status. Narasimhan defends his sister, causing strain in his marriage. Around the same time, Ganga learns that her aunt Seetha, now bedridden after suffering a paralysis, wishes to seek forgiveness for her past cruelty. Displaying compassion, Ganga visits her aunt and nurses her back to health. Later, Yamuna realizes her mistakes and reconciles with her.

Around this time, tragedy strikes Annayya's family when Champa suffers multiple heart attacks. Annayya asks Ganga and Narasimhan to assist in caring for her children. Ganga devotes herself to Champa's recovery and grows close to the family, but Champa eventually dies after a third attack. Grief-stricken, Annayya finally reveals that he had loved Ganga all along and had married Champa only because he believed Ganga did not share his feelings. For the sake of his children and their future, he asks Ganga to marry him. Initially reluctant, Ganga agrees after Narasimhan urges her to accept a life of companionship and happiness, bringing her long journey of sacrifice and duty to a fulfilling conclusion.

== Cast ==
- Srinath as Annayya
- Aarathi as Ganga
- Ashok as Narasimhan
  - Manju as young Narasimhan (credited as Master Manju)
- T. N. Balakrishna as Sampanna
- Dwarakish as Shreepathi, Sampanna's son
- Sampath as Narasimhan's father-in-law
- Musuri Krishnamurthy as Achyutha
- H. R. Shastry as Ganga's father
- Sanju as Chandrakanth, Annayya's son (credited as Master Sanju)
- B. V. Radha as Champa
- Sathyapriya as Yamuna (credited as Anuradha)
- M. N. Lakshmi Devi as Seetha
- B. Jaya as Ganga's employer
- Rashmi as Lakshmi, Annayya's daughter (credited as Baby Rashmi)
- M. S. Umesh as stage actor (uncredited role)

== Soundtrack ==
The music for the film and its soundtrack was composed by Rajan–Nagendra, with lyrics for the soundtrack written by Chi. Udaya Shankar. All the songs composed for the film were received extremely well and considered as evergreen songs. The album cosists of four tracks.

Track listing
No.	Title	Singer(s)	Length
1.	"Aakasha Deepavu Neenu"	S. P. Balasubrahmanyam, S. Janaki	4:19
2.	"Aakasha Deepavu Neenu (sad)"	S. Janaki	4:21
3.	"Modalane Dinave"	S. P. Balasubrahmanyam, S. Janaki	4:34
4.	"Hoovondu Beku Ballige"	S. Janaki	4:22
Total length:			17:36
