= S. Janaki =

Indian singer (1938–2026)

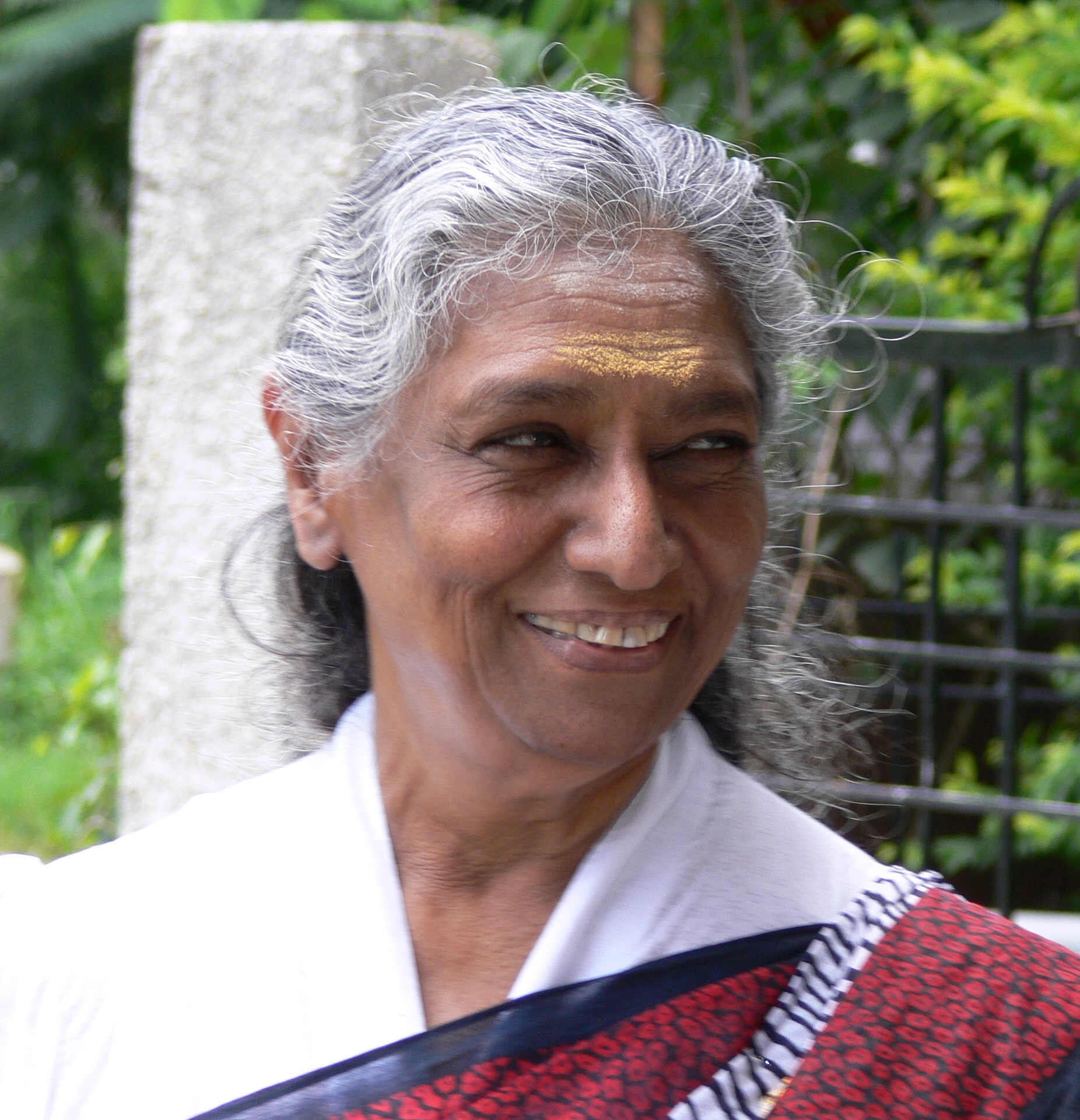
- Janaki in 2007
- Born: Sistla Janaki; 23 April 1938; Pallapatla, Madras Province, British Raj (now in Andhra Pradesh, India)
- Died: 11 July 2026 (aged 88); Mysuru, Karnataka, India
- Occupation: Playback singer
- Years active: 1957–2016
- Spouse: V. Ramaprasad (m. 1959; died 1997)
- Children: 1
- Relatives: Garimella Balakrishna Prasad (nephew)
- Honours: Kalaimamani (1986); Rajyotsava Prashasti (2014)
- Musical career
- Genres: .Filmi; .semi-classical .classical .Folk .pop .Devotional and Bhajans; []
- Instrument: Vocals
- Website: sjanaki.net

Sistla Janaki (23 April 1938 – 11 July 2026) was an Indian playback singer and occasional music composer. Fondly known as Janaki Amma (lit. Mother Janaki) and described as the 𝗡𝗶𝗴𝗵𝘁𝗶𝗻𝗴𝗮𝗹𝗲 𝗼𝗳 𝗶𝗻𝗱𝗶𝗮𝗻 𝗺𝘂𝘀𝗶𝗰 and "Nightingale of South India", Janaki is considered one of the greatest and most influential singers in the history of Indian music.She was widely regarded as most versatile singer of Indian music. She was widely acclaimed as the "Queen of Expression and Modulation".

Janaki recorded over 48,000 songs in films, albums, television, and radio, which includes solos, duets, chorus and title tracks in over 20 Indian languages as well as a few foreign languages, with highest number of songs in Kannada. She was one of the most versatile singers in India.

Janaki began her singing career with the Tamil film Vidhiyin Vilayattu (1957) at the age of 19 and recorded songs in six different languages in the same year. Her career spanned over six decades until 2016, when she announced her retirement from singing for films and stage appearances. However, she returned in 2018, singing for the Tamil film Pannaadi. She was active in the music industry for almost 60 years.

She won four National Film Awards and 33 different state film awards. She was a recipient of an honorary doctorate from the University of Mysore, the Kalaimamani award from the Government of Tamil Nadu, and the Rajyotsava Prashasti award from the Government of Karnataka. In 2013, she refused to accept the Padma Bhushan, the third-highest civilian award of India. She felt the honor came "too late" in her career. Furthermore, she expressed disappointment over the lack of representation and due recognition for South Indian artists in the national awards list.

== Early and personal life ==
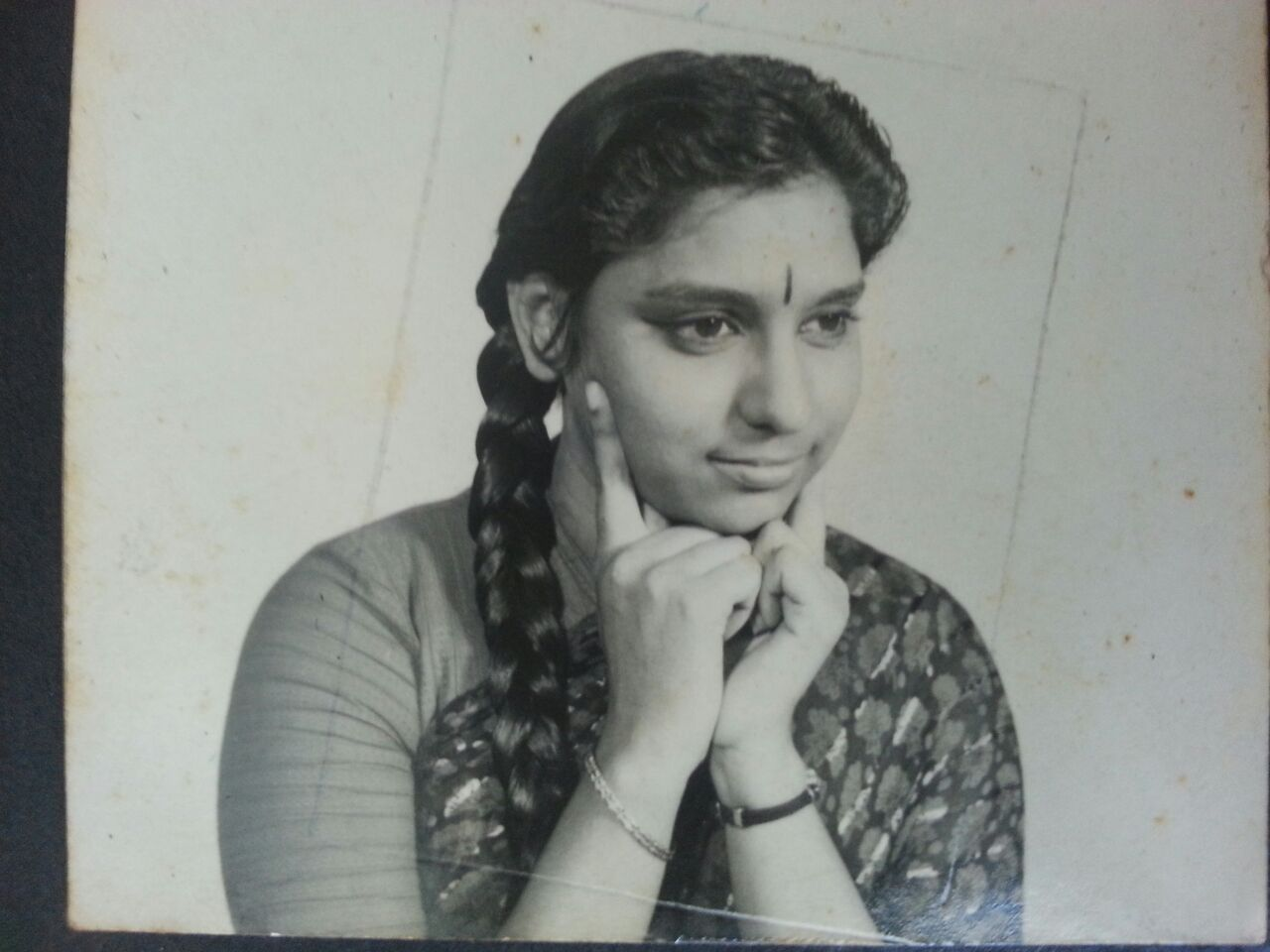
Janaki in early years

Janaki was born in the Pallapatla village of Madras Province, British Raj (now in Bapatla district, Andhra Pradesh, India) on 23 April 1938. Her father, Sistla Sreeramamurthy, was an Ayurvedic doctor and teacher. She spent most of her childhood in Sircilla (now in Telangana, India) where she got her first on-stage performance opportunity at the age of nine. She learnt the basics of music through a Nadaswaram vidwan, Paidiswamy. She never pursued any formal training in classical music.

She married V. Ramprasad in 1959. He encouraged her career and accompanied her during most of her recordings. He died in 1997 due to cardiac arrest.

Janaki's mother language was Telugu, but she also sang songs in roughly 20 languages in India, including Kannada, Telugu, Tamil, Malayalam, Hindi, Konkani, Odia, Tulu, Urdu, Punjabi and Bengali.

Janaki died in Mysuru, Karnataka on 11 July 2026, at the age of 88, due to age-related ailments. She was cremated with full state honour by the government of karnataka.

== Career ==
While in her twenties, Janaki moved to Chennai on the advice of her uncle to work with the music composer R. Sudarsanam in AVM Studios as a singer. She started her career as a playback singer in the Tamil movie Vidhiyin Vilayattu in 1957. Subsequently, she performed in the Telugu film M.L.A.. She sang film songs in 6 languages in her first year.

Janaki picked the Malayalam lullaby "Amma Poovinum" from 10 Kalpanakal as the swansong of her 60-year singing career and retired on 28 October 2017 with a concert held at Mysuru.

=== Telugu films ===
Janaki started her career in Telugu films in 1957 in the film M.L.A. Movies like Bava Maradallu, Pooja Phalam and Bangaru Panjaram had songs by S. Janaki which were immensely popular. She sang continuous hits throughout the 1960s and 70s, continuing this streak until about the mid-90s. Janaki won 12 Nandi awards, 10 for films and 2 for television serial songs. A few of her solos are:

- "Nee Aasa Adiyaasa" and "Idenandi Idenandi Bhagyanagaramu" - M.L.A. (1957)
- "Podamu Ravoi Bava" - Kutumba Gowravam (1957)
- "Anukunadanta" - Anna Thammudu (1958)
- "Gaajulamma Gaajulu" - Karthavarayuni Katha (1958)
- "Le Le Le" - Sobha (1958)
- "Aakashamele Andala Raje" - Rakta Sambandham (1962)
- "Ee Pagalu" - Siri Sampadalu (1962)
- "Venugaanammu Vinipinchene" Siri Sampadalu (1962)
- "Puvvu Navvenu" Siri Sampadalu (1962)
- "Pilichi" in Simharasi (2001)

=== Kannada films ===
Janaki sang the most songs in her career in Kannada. Her solos and duets with legends such as P B Srinivas, S. P. Balasubrahmanyam, and Dr. Rajkumar are considered evergreen hits.

She sang her first Kannada song in 1957. By the early 60s, she had started working with many prominent music composers. Throughout the 1970s and 80s, she remained the number one go-to female playback singer in Kannada films. Most of the music directors, from G. K. Venkatesh, Rajan–Nagendra to Hamsalekha, offered her most of their top compositions.

Janaki had a record number of duets with P B Srinivas, S P Balasubrahmanyam, and Dr Rajkumar. She was awarded the Rajyotsava Prashasti in 2014. Janaki was awarded an honorary doctorate from the University of Mysore for her tremendous contribution to Kannada film and music.

Some of her solos in Kannada cinema are:

- "Shiva Shiva Ennada Naaligeyeke" Hemavathi (1977)
- "Poojisalende Hoogala" Eradu Kanasu (1974)
- "Gaganavu Ello" Gejje Pooje (1969)
- "Omme Ninnanu" Gaali Maathu (1981)
- "Gaaligopura Ninnashatheera" Nanda Deepa (1963)
- "Nambide Ninna" Sandhya Raga (1966)
- "Barede Neenu" Seetha (1970 film)
- "Banallu Neene" Bayalu Daari (1976)
- "Karedaru Kelade" Sanaadi Appanna (1977)
- "Deepavu Ninnade" Mysore Mallige (film) (1992)
- "Bharatha Bhooshira" Upasane (1974)
- "Sukhada Swapna Gaana" Mareyada Haadu (1981)
- "Thangaliyalli Naanu" Janma Janmada Anubandha (1980)
- "Akasha Deepavu Neenu" Pavana Ganga (1977)
- "Aaseya Bhava Olavina Jeeva" Mangalya Bhagya (1976)
- "Mahalaksmi Manege" Lakshmi Kataksha (1985)
- "Hoovondu Beku Ballige" Pavana Ganga (1977)
- "Ragavendra- Bidenu Ninna Pada" Naa Ninna Bidalare (1979)
- "Kangalu Thumbiralu" Chandanada Gombe (1979)
- "Olavina Gelayane" Naniruvude Ninagagi (1979)
- "Manase Nagaleke" Namma Makkalu (1969)
- "Nagisalu Neenu" Gaali Maathu (1981)

=== Malayalam films ===
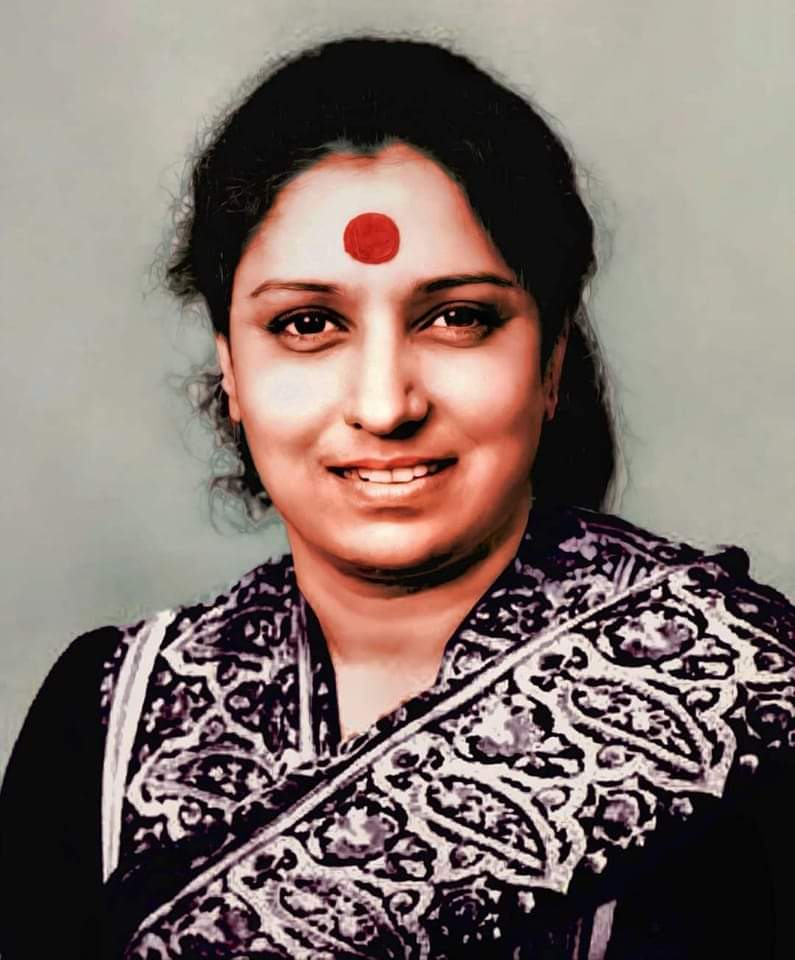
Janaki in the 1980s

Janaki sang her first Malayalam song in 1957. She practiced the correct accent and the nuances of the language, which made her the most sought-after singer in the industry throughout 1970s until mid 80s. She was the favorite of many popular music composers like V Dakshinamoorthi, MS Baburaj, Shyam, MB Sreenivasan, A.T.Ummer and Salil Choudhary.

She went on to sing thousands of songs from the early 1960s to the mid-80s. She received her first Kerala state film award for best singer in 1970 and went on to win the same award almost every year for the next 15 years.

Some of her solo tracks in Malayalam films are:

- "Thaliritta Kinaakkal" Moodupadam (1963)
- "Sooryakaanthi" Kattuthulasi (1965)
- "Keshaadipadam Thozhunnen" (Pakal Kinavu) (1966)
- "Oru Kochu Swapnathin" (Tharavattamma) (1966)
- "Ezhuthiyathaaraanu" (Udhyogastha) (1967)
- "Thenum Vayambum" Thenum Vayambum (1981)
- "Ettumanoor Ambalathil" (Oppol) (1981)
- "Ente Janmam Neeyeduthu" (Itha Oru Dhikkari) (1981)
- "Thumbi Vaa Thumbakudathin" Olangal (1982)
- "Swarna Mukile" Ithu Njangalude Katha (1982)
- "Oru Vattam Koodiyen" (Chillu) (1982)
- "Aadi Vaa Katte" (Koodevide) (1983)
- " Mizhiyithalil" (Onnaman) (2002)
- "Aazha Kadalinte" (Chanthupottu) (2005)
- "Thazhampoo Thottilil" (Mizhikal Sakshi) (2008)
- "Amma Poovinum" 10 Kalpanakal (2016)

=== Tamil films ===
Janaki sang her first Tamil song in 1957. The song Singaravelane Deva from the movie Konjum Salangai brought her into the limelight in Tamil films. M. S. Viswanathan gave her many hit songs every year throughout the 60s and early 70s. It was the song Unnidathil ennaik kodutthen from Avalukendru Or Manam (1971) that consolidated her position among the most promising singers in the Tamil industry.

She sang many songs under many famous composers. Ilaiyaraaja, S. P. Balasubrahmanyam, and Janaki produced songs together from 1970s till the 1990s. Janaki was the only singer who has won state awards under the oft-called top three music composers of the state (M. S. Viswanathan, Ilaiyaraaja and A. R. Rahman).

Some of her solos in Tamil cinema are:

- "Singara Velane Deva" Konjum Salangai (1962)
- "Oho Endhan Baby" (Thennilavu) (1961)
- "Adichirukku Nallathoru Chansu" (Nallavan Vazhvan) (1961)
- "Indha Mandrathil Odi Varum" Policekaran Magal (1962)
- "Kannan Mananilayai" Deivathin Deivam (1962)
- "Pakalil Pesum Nilavinai Kanden" (Sengamala Theevu) (1962)
- "Pandhal Irundhaal" (Bandha Pasam) (1962)
- "Unnidathil Ennai Koduthen (Avalukendru Or Manam) (1971)
- "Konduvaa Innum Konjam" (Neerum Neruppum) (1971)
- "Amma Amma" Velaiilla Pattadhari (2014)

=== Hindi films ===
Composer Bappi Lahiri was impressed by a Hindi song sung by S Janaki for a Tamil movie, when he visited Prasad Studio. He decided to have songs sung by her in his upcoming Hindi movies and introduced her to Bollywood. She sang many duets with singer Kishore Kumar.

Some of her notable Hindi songs are

- "Prabhu More Awgun Chit Na Dharo" and "Ayo Prabhat Sab Mil Gaayo" - Sur Sangam (1985)
- "Yaar Bina Chain Kahan Re" and "Jawan Hai Dil Jawan Hain Hum" - Saaheb (1985)
- "Aayaa Jab Se Tu Dil Mein" - Jhoothi (1985)
- "Sun Rubia Tumse Pyar Ho Gaya" - Mard (1985)
- "Mamla Gadbad Hai" and "Aankhen do" - Dharm Adhikari (1986)
- "Tune Mera Doodh Piya" Aakhree Raasta (1986)
- "Pag Paadam" Naache Mayuri(1986)
- "Dil Mein Ho Tum" Satyamev Jayate (1987)
- "Main Tere Liye" Main Tere Liye (1989)
- "Poocho Na Kaisa Maza" Awwal Number (1990)
- "Gopala Gopala" Humse Hai Muquabala (1994)

=== Odia films ===
Janaki sang many evergreen songs in Odia. She has sung about 68 songs in Odia films. Her songs are still popular today, and she also won 1 Orissa State Film Award for Odia film Sata Kebe Luchi Rahena (1986)

=== Tulu films ===
- Dareda Budedi (1971)
- Bisatti Babu (1972)
- Koti Chennayya (1973) -- "Ekkasaka Ekkasaka"
- Udalda Tudar (1973)
- Yaan Sanyasi Aape (1973)
- Bayya Mallige (1974)
- Belli Dota (1977)
- Nyayog Jindabad (1978)
- Kariyani Kattandi Kandane (1978)

=== Other languages ===
Janaki also sang a few songs in other languages.

- One Japanese song in Adutha Veettu Penn (1960)
- One German song in Puthu Paatu (1990)
- One English song in Swayamkrushi (1986)
- One Sinhala song (Mal Peedi Prema Wrukshaye) in Sihinaya (1959).

== Collaboration with music directors ==
Janaki worked with music directors of different generations. From the early 1960s she was given songs by composers mainly in Kannada and Malayalam films. Though she sang fewer songs in Telugu and Tamil during the beginning of her career, she went on to sing across all four south Indian languages from the mid 1970s.

=== A. R. Rahman ===
During the '90s, Janaki sang many great Tamil and Telugu songs for A. R. Rahman at the early stage of his career. Songs like "Ottagatha Kattiko", "Gopala Gopala", "Nenjinele", "Kadhal Kaditham Theetave", "Mudhalvane", "Endhan Nenjil", and "Margazhi Thingal" are still popular. She won the Tamil Nadu State Film Award for Best Female Playback Singer for "Margazhi Thingal" from the film Sangamam under his composition.

=== G. K. Venkatesh ===
G. K. Venkatesh collaborated with S. Janaki in the early 1960s. Two songs that need special mention from this combination are "Nambide ninna naadhadevate" from Sandhya Raga and "Karedaru kelade" from Sanaadi Appanna: both became very popular. Dr. Rajkumar, who had begun his acting career in the 1950s, got to sing his first duet with Janaki – "Tumbitu Manavaa" – for the film "Mahishasura Mardini" in which he played the villain.

=== Hamsalekha ===
By the end of 80s Hamsalekha established himself as the top music composer in Kannada cinema pushing all the veteran composers to the background. His strong association with actor Ravichandran resulted in many hit songs. Janaki was his first choice during the initial days of his career. They had duets in movies like Premaloka and Ranadheera. Janaki worked in more than 40 films with Hamsalekha.

=== Ilaiyaraaja ===
Ilaiyaraaja knew about Janaki's vocal range and versatility when he worked with G. K. Venkatesh. When he got a chance to compose music for his debut film Annakkili (1976) he asked Janaki to sing 3 songs which became immensely popular, beginning an era in Tamil cinema. S Janaki won four state awards in Tamil in his compositions.

Janaki sang most of her duets with S. P. Balasubrahmanyam, Malaysia Vasudevan, Mano, K. J. Yesudas, and Jayachandran. Ilaiyaraaja himself sang around 200 duets with Janaki. Many of the greatest hits for Kamal Haasan the singer came in collaboration with S. Janaki under Ilaiyaraaja's music direction. These include "Ninaivo Oru Paravai" from Sigappu Rojakkal, "Sundari Neeyum" from Michael Madana Kama Rajan, "Kanmani Anbodu Kadhalan" from Gunaa, and the duet version of "Inji Iduppazhagi" from Thevar Magan. After Ilaiyaraaja started giving more songs to S. Janaki, other music composers followed.

=== M. Ranga Rao ===
M. Ranga Rao was one of the composers who contributed memorable songs to Kannada film music. He collaborated with Janaki for many films, including Edakallu Guddada Mele ("Sanyasi Sanyasi") directed by Puttanna Kanagal. Ranga Rao composed memorable duets sung by Dr. Rajkumar and Janaki for "Vasanta Geeta", "Hosabelaku", and "Samayada Gombe".

For Hosabelaku, Ranga Rao composed a melodious tune for a poem by Rashtrakavi Kuvempu "Teredide Mane O Baa Atithi" and Janaki sang this along with another legendary singer, Vani Jayaram.

=== M. S. Baburaj ===
The earliest recognised collaboration of Janaki's was with the Malayalam composer MS Baburaj, who specialised in Hindustani music. Some of Janaki's best known solos come from this collaboration, including Vasantha Panchami Naalil (Bhargavi Nilayam), Anjana Kannezhuthi (Thacholi Othenan) and Thaane Thirinjum Marinjum (Ambalapravu).

=== Rajan–Nagendra ===
Janaki was a part of almost all their albums. During the initial days, RN gave many duets to PBS-SJ. Later their main singers were SPB and Janaki. Radios called the pair of SPB and S Janaki as "Love Birds" and are termed to be the "Best singing pair" in Kannada cinema, owing mainly to their romantic duets composed by Rajan–Nagendra in the 1970s and 80s. In terms of numbers, it was Rajan–Nagendra who gave maximum songs to Janaki after Ilaiyaraaja. Some top hit songs came from movies such as Eradu Kanasu, Hombisilu, Gaali Maathu, Pavana Ganga, Avala Hejje, Chandana Gombe, Naa Ninna Bidalare and the list continues.

=== Vijaya Bhaskar ===
Though his main singers were P Susheela in 60s and Vani Jayaram and Chitra in 70s and 80s, he gave some of his best compositions to Janaki in movies like Gejje Pooje, Bellimoda, Upasane, and Seetha (1970 film). "Gaganavu ello bhoomiyu ello" remains one of the most memorable songs of Janaki.

== Legacy and popularity ==
Janaki did a wide range of voice modulation according to the age of the character. Tamil Nadu state award for "Poda poda pokka" song from Uthiripookkal (1979) and Andhra Pradesh State award for "Govullu tellana" song from Saptapadi. The song "Kanna nee engey" from the Tamil film Rusi Kanda Poonai (1980), also penned by her, was sung entirely by Janaki in a child's voice. So was the song "Mummy Mummy" sung by her from the Malayalam film Ee Thanalil Ithiri Nerum (1985). Songs she sang in children's-voice in 70s in Kannada too were popular, one such song is "Thayiya thandeya" from the film Madhura Sangama (1978). She sang many such songs for many different characters of different ages. She sang more than 48000+ songs across all languages.

=== Toughest song ===
Janaki said that the toughest song of her singing career is the Kannada song "Shiva Shiva Ennada Naaligeyeke" from the movie Hemavathi, which featured many fast swaras. The song, which is in two different ragas, Thodi and Aabhogi, was composed by L. Vaidyanathan.

== Awards and honours ==
Awards
Awards	Wins
National Film Awards	4
Kerala State Film Awards	11
Andhra Pradesh State Film Awards	11
Tamil Nadu State Film Awards	6
Karnataka Rajyotsava award	1
Orissa State Film Award	1
Total	33

National Film Awards

Best Female Playback Singer

- 1977 – (Song: "Senthoora Poove") 16 Vayathinile,Tamil Film
- 1981 – (Song: "Ettumanoorambalathil") Oppol, Malayalam Film
- 1984 – (Song: "Vennello godari andham") Sitaara, Telugu Film
- 1992 – (Song: "Inji Iduppazhagha") Devar Magan, Tamil Film

Mirchi Music Awards

- 2015 – Filmfare Lifetime Achievement Award – South

Filmfare Awards South

- Filmfare Lifetime Achievement Award – South – 1997

Kerala State Film Awards

Best Female Playback Singer

- 1970 – Sthree
- 1972 – Pulliman
- 1974 – Chandrakantham
- 1976 – Aalinganam
- 1977 – Madanolsavam
- 1979 – Thakara
- 1980 – Manjil Virinja Pookkal,Chamaram, Aniyatha Valakal
- 1981 – Various films
- 1982 – Various films
- 1983 – Various film
- 1984 – Kanamarayathu

Nandi Awards (Andhra Pradesh State Film, Music, Television and Arts Awards)

Best Female Playback Singer

- 1980 – Sri Vasavi Kanyaka Parameswari Mahatyam
- 1981 – Sapthapadhi
- 1983 – Sagara Sangamam
- 1985 – Pratighatana
- 1986 – Aruna Kiranam
- 1988 – Janaki Ramudu
- 1994 – Bhairava Dweepam
- 1997 – Thodu
- 1998 – Anthapuram for the song "Suridu Puvva..."
- 2000 – Sri Sai Mahima

Tamil Nadu State Film Awards

Best Female Playback Singer

- 1970 – Namma Kuzhanthaigal
- 1977 – 16 Vayathinile Song: Senthoora poove
- 1979 – Uthiripookkal Song: Azhagiya kanne
- 1981 – Moondram Pirai
- 1982 – Kaadhal Oviyam
- 1999 – Sangamam Song: Margazhi thingal

Orissa State Film Awards

- 1986 – Best Female Playback Singer – Sata Kebe Luchi Rahena

Filmfare Awards

- 1986: Filmfare Award for Best Female Playback Singer – Nomination – "Yaar Bina Chain Kahan Re (Saaheb)

Padma Awards

- 2013: Padma Bhushan award the 3rd highest civilian honour of India announced by Govt. of India for her contributions to arts. But she declined it.

Special honours

- 1986 – Kalaimamani from the Government of Tamil Nadu
- 1987 – Sursinger Award for Mayuri (Hindi Version)
- 1992 – Paavender Bharathidasan Award (Tamil Nadu State Film Honorary Award)
- 1997 – Filmfare Lifetime Achievement Award – South
- 2002 – Cinema 'Achiever Award' from the Government of Kerala
- 2001 – Special Jury Swaralaya Yesudas Award for outstanding performance in music
- 2006 – Favourite Female Playback Singer Vijay Awards
- 2009 – honorary doctorate from the University of Mysore for contributions to Kannada Cinema
- 2011 – "Basava Bhushan" Award from Karnataka
- 2012 – Evergreen Voice of Indian Cinema Vijay Music Awards
- 2013 – Maa Music Life Time achievement award by Maa Music Awards
- 2013 – Padma Bhushan Award from Government of India (She refused to accept it citing too late and too little)
- 2013 – Lifetime Achievement Award from Udaya Film Awards
- 2014 – Karnataka Rajyotsava award, the second highest civilian award of the Karnataka state, by the Government of Karnataka in 2014
- 2014 – Dr. Rajkumar Lifetime Achievement Award for the contribution to the Kannada Cinema
- 2015 – Life Time Achievement Award from Radio Mirchi for Outstanding Contribution in all South Indian Languages [Kannada, Malayalam, Tamil and Telugu]
- 2016 – SIIMA Lifetime Achievement Award for Outstanding Contribution in all South Indian Languages
- 2018 – Santosham Lifetime Achievement Award at 16th Santosham Film Awards.
- 2018 June 5 – SPB National Award by S. P. Balasubrahmanyam.
- 2019– First Recipient of the MS Subbulakshmi National Award for immense contribution to the field of music, Tamil Nadu State Government

Other awards

- First Recipient of M S Baburaj Award
- First Recipient of P. Susheela trust National Award
- First Recipient of V Dakshinamoorthi Award
- Madhavapeddi Sathyam Award
- Vayalar Award for contribution to Malayalam Film Music
- Geeta Dutt Award from Andhra Pradesh Government
- Chi Udayashankar Award
- Sangeetha Ganga Gayana Award
- Sangeetha Rathna by Sangeetha Kalavedika
- Singer of the Century Award
- Manna Dey Puraskaar in 2014
- Singer Jikki Award in 2014
- First Recipient of Ramu Karyat Foundation Award
- Gulf Malayalam Musical Award
