= Anekal =

Anekal ಆನೇಕಲ್
- Town and Taluk
- Etymology: Kannada for 'Elephant rock'
- Location in Karnataka, India
- Coordinates: 12.7°N 77.7°E
- Country: India
- State: Karnataka
- District: Bangalore Urban
- Taluk: Anekal

Government
  - Type: Municipality
  - Body: Anekal Town Municipal Council

Area
  - Total: 5 km^{2} (1.9 sq mi)
- Elevation: 915 m (3,002 ft)

Population (2011)
  - Total: 44,644
  - Density: 8,900/km^{2} (23,000/sq mi)

Languages
  - Official: Kannada
- Time zone: UTC+5:30 (IST)
- PIN: 562106
- Telephone code: 91-80
- Vehicle registration: KA 51 and KA 59
- Website: www.anekaltown.mrc.gov.in

Anekal (ಆನೇಕಲ್) is a major town and taluk of Bengaluru Urban district, part of the Bangalore Metropolitan Region. It is a major town and a satellite town in the suburbs of Bengaluru. The Chandapura-Anekal stretch is an emerging residential hub in Bengaluru. It is approximately 36 km from the centre of Bengaluru and around 15 km from Hosur and Electronic City. It lies in the southern part of the Bangalore metropolitan area. Anekal is known for the Karaga and Dasara festivals.

Major multinational corporations and IT-BT companies like Infosys, Biocon, Wipro, Syngene, TCS, and Accenture and largest NGO like Akshayapatra Foundation are all part of Anekal Taluk. Jigani, which is situated 10 km from Anekal, is one of the industrial areas in Bengaluru.

The population has nearly doubled since 2011.

== Geography ==
Anekal is located at 12.7°N 77.7°E or 12°42′0″N 77°42′0″E. It has an average elevation of 915 metres or around 3,002 feet.

== Demographics ==
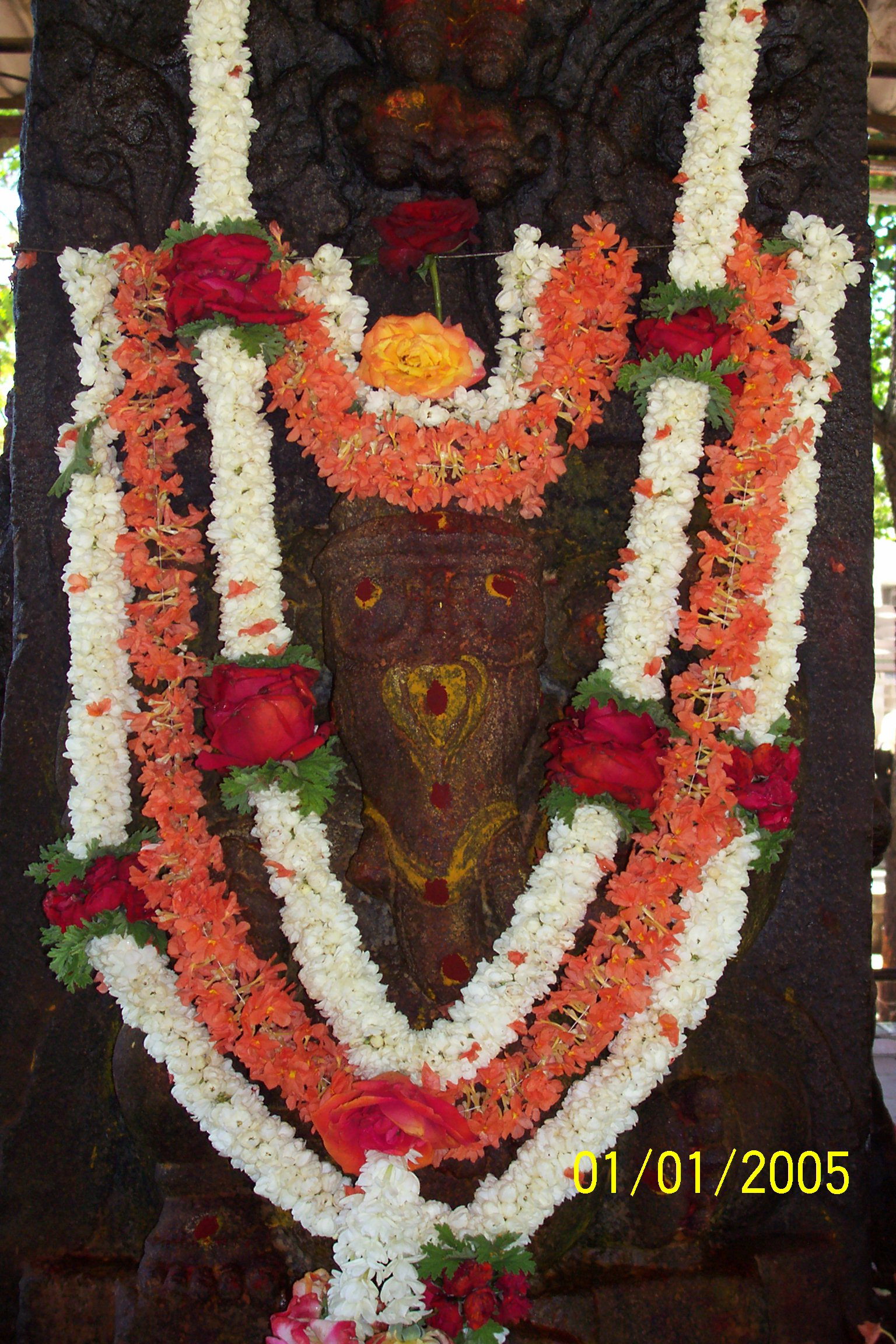
Kambada Ganesha Temple

As of 2011 India census, Anekal had a population of 44,260. Males constitute 52% of the population, while the latter is constituted by females. Kannada is the official and most widely spoken language in Anekal. Anekal has an average literacy rate of 67%, higher than the national average of 59.5%, with 56% of the males being literate, and 44% of females being literate. 12% of the population is under 6 years of age.

== Road and Railways ==
Anekal is well connected to nearby areas like Jigani, Chandapura, and Hosur. Frequent buses run by BMTC connect Anekal to Majestic.

BMTC bus routes from Anekal:

Route No	Destination
356M	KBS - Majestic (Via Electronic city)
V-356M	KBS - Majestic (Via Electronic city)
600CA	Banashankari (Via Electronic city)
399C	Chikka Tirupathi (Via Attibele)
399CA	Chikka Tirupathi (Via Chandapura)
399F	Hoskote (Via Sarjapura, Varthur)
361C	K.R.Market (Via Electronic city)
356Z	Chandapura
365P	KBS - Majestic (Via Bannerughatta)
366Z	K.R.Market (Via Bannerughatta)

DEMU trains connects Anekal Road railway station with Yeshwantpur and Bangalore city junction. The nearest Metro station is Bommasandra metro (Yellow line) which is 13 kms from Anekal.

Trains having stoppage at Anekal Road railway station are:

1. Yeshwantpur - Hosur MEMU
2. KSR Bengaluru - Dharmapuri MEMU
3. SMVT Bengaluru - Karaikal Express
4. Yeshwantpur - Salem Express

== Education ==
Alliance University situated in Anekal provides various courses in Engineering, Arts, Law and Management. Sri Sairam College of Engineering offers courses in different streams of engineering. St Joseph's School and College offers different courses at the PUC level.

== Tourist Attractions ==
1. Muthyala Maduvu Falls
2. Sri Thimmaraya Swami Gudi - Anekal

== See also ==
- Marasuru Madivala
- Marasuru Madiwala Inscriptions and Sculpture
