= List of Kannada films of 1965 =

== Top-grossing films ==
Rank	Title	Collection	Ref.
1.	Satya Harishchandra	₹1 crore (₹80.26 crore in 2025)	
2.	Bettada Huli	₹10 lakh (₹8 crore in 2025)	

== List ==
The following is a list of films produced in the Kannada film industry in India in 1965, presented in alphabetical order.

Title	Director	Cast	Music director	Producer
Amarajeevi	G. Krishnamurthy	Raja Shankar, Balakrishna, Harini	Vijaya Bhaskar	D. Narayanappa
Baalaraajana Kathe	Venunath	Kalyan Kumar, G. V. Latha, Narasimharaju	S. Hanumatha	RYC Films
Beratha Jeeva	K. R. Seetharama Sastry	Kalyan Kumar, B. Saroja Devi, Jayanthi	Vijaya Bhaskar	K. R. Seetharama Sastry
Bettada Huli	A. V. Sheshagiri Rao	Rajkumar, Udaya Kumar, Jayanthi	T. G. Lingappa	Shri Bhagavati
Chandrahasa	B. S. Ranga	Rajkumar, Leelavathi, Udaya Kumar	S. Hanumantha	B. S. Ranga
Ide Mahasudina	B. C. Srinivas	Rajkumar, Udaya Kumar, Leelavathi	Naadahamsa	Udaya Kumar
Mavana Magalu	S. K. A. Chari	Kalyan Kumar, Jayalalitha, K. S. Ashwath	T. Chalapathi Rao	A. V. Subba Rao
Maduve Madi Nodu	Hunsur Krishnamurthy	Rajkumar, Leelavathi, R. Nagendra Rao	Ghantasala	Naagi Reddy
Mahasathi Anasuya	B. S. Ranga	Rajkumar, K. S. Ashwath, Pandaribai	S. Hanumatha	B. S. Ranga
Miss Leelavathi	M. R. Vittal	Udaya Kumar, Ramesh, Jayanthi	R. Sudarshanam	K. S. Jagannath
Naga Pooja	D. S. Rajgopal	Rajkumar, Leelavathi, Rajashree	T. G. Lingappa	Bhaktavatsalam
Nanna Kartavya	Vedaantam	Kalyan Kumar, Jayalalithaa, R. Nagendra Rao	G. K. Venkatesh	K. S. Satyanarayana
Pathala Mohini	S. N. Singh	B. M. Venkatesh, Vanishree, Narasimharaju	Rajan-Nagendra	S. N. Singh
Pathivratha	P. S. Murthy	Rajkumar, Udaya Kumar, Harini	T. A. Moti	M. N. Srinivas
Sarvagna Murthy	Aaruru Pattabhi	Rajkumar, Harini, Mynavathi	G. K. Venkatesh	Narendra Babu
Sathi Savithri	P. R. Kaundinya	Rajkumar, Krishnakumari, Udaya Kumar	G. K. Venkatesh	N. Vishweshwariah
Satya Harishchandra	Hunsur Krishnamurthy	Rajkumar, Pandaribai, Udaya Kumar	Hunsur Krishnamurthy	K. V. Reddy
Vathsalya	Y. R. Swamy	Rajkumar, Leelavathi, Udaya Kumar	Vijaya	S. Heera
Veera Vikrama	S. R. Rajan	Udaya Kumar, Leelavathi, Raajan	T. A. Mothi	S. R. Rajan

== See also ==
- Kannada films of 1964
- Kannada films of 1966
