= List of Kannada films of 1967 =

== Top-grossing films ==
Rank	Title	Collection	Ref.
1.	Immadi Pulikeshi	₹80 lakh (₹50.46 crore in 2025)	
2.	Belli Moda	₹60 lakh (₹35 crore in 2025)	

== List ==
The following is a list of films produced in the Kannada film industry in India in 1967, presented in alphabetical order.

Title	Director	Cast	Music director	Producer
Anuradha	Aaruru Pattabhi	K. S. Ashwath, Pandari Bai, Mynavathi	Rajan–Nagendra	Pandari Bai
Bangaarada Hoovu	B. A. Arasu	Rajkumar, Kalpana, Udaya Kumar	Rajan–Nagendra	B. A. Arasu
Beedi Basavanna	B. R. Panthulu	Rajkumar, Vandana, Bharathi	T. G. Lingappa	B. R. Panthulu
Belli Moda	S. R. Puttanna Kanagaal	Kalyan Kumar, Kalpana, K. S. Ashwath	Vijaya Bhaskar	T. N. Srinivasan
Black Market	S. N. Singh	Sampath, Vandana, Narasimharaju	Satyam	S. N. Singh
Chakra Theertha	Peketi Sivaram	Rajkumar, Udaya Kumar, Jayanthi	T. G. Lingappa	S. N. Pal
Devara Gedda Manava	Hunsur Krishnamurthy	Rajkumar, Jayanthi, Narasimharaju	Rajan–Nagendra	Y. V. Rao
Dhana Pishachi	S. N. Singh	Ranga, Kalpana, Narasimharaju	G. K. Venkatesh	S. N. Singh
Gange Gowri	B. R. Panthulu	Rajkumar, Leelavathi, K. S. Ashwath	T. G. Lingappa	B. R. Panthulu
Immadi Pulikeshi	N. C. Raajan	Rajkumar, Jayanthi, Udaya Kumar	G. K. Venkatesh	Sri Venkatesh
Jaanara Jaana	B. Satyam	Rajaashankar, M. P. Shankar, Vanisri	G. K. Venkatesh	G. K. Murthy
Kallu Sakkare	Kalyan Kumar	Kalyan Kumar, Revati, Vandana	N. S. Thyagarajan	Kalyan Kumar
Kranthiveera Sangolli Rayanna	Baburao	Abhi Bhattacharya, Kaamini Kadam, V. S. Patil	Lakshmana	Anantha
Lagna Pathrike	K. S. L. Swamy	Rajkumar, Jayanthi, Narasimharaju	Vijaya Bhaskar	A. M. Sameeulla
Manassiddare Marga	M. R. Vittal	Rajkumar, Jayanthi, Rajaashankar	M.Ranga Rao	Srikanth Nahata
Miss Bangalore	P. S. Murthy	Jayanthi, Vandana, Narasimharaju	Sriramulu	Padmavathi
Muddu Meena	Y. R. Swamy	Kalyan Kumar, Jayanthi, K. S. Ashwath	G. K. Venkatesh	S. Heera
Nakkare Ade Swarga	M. R. Vittal	Arun Kumar, Shylashri, Narasimharaju	M. Ranga Rao	Srikanth Nahata
Onde Balliya Hoogalu	M. S. Nayak	K. S. Ashwath, B. V. Radha, Rajaashankar	Satyam	Vanamaala S.
Parvathi Kalyana	B. S. Ranga	Rajkumar, Jayashree, Udaya Kumar	G. K. Venkatesh	B. S. Ranga
Padavidhara	C. V. Shivashankar	Udaya Kumar, Balakrishna, Narasimharaju	R. Rathna	C. K. Gowda
Premakkoo Permitte	R. Nagendra Rao	Kalyan Kumar, Arun Kumar, Kalpana	Vijaya Bhaskar	Harini
Rajadurgada Rahasya	A. C. Narasimha	Rajkumar, Bharati, Udaya Kumar	G. K. Venkatesh	A. Vasudeva Rao
Rajashekara	G. V. Iyer	Rajkumar, Bharati, Udaya Kumar	G. K. Venkatesh	B. S. Ranga
Sathi Sukanya	Y. R. Swamy	Rajkumar, Harini, Udaya Kumar	Rajan–Nagendra	Y. R. Swamy
Sri Purandara Daasaru	C. V. Raju	K. S. Ashwath, Pandari Bai, R. Nagendra Rao	C. N. Panduranga	Smt. Jayalakshmi

== See also ==
- Kannada films of 1966
- Kannada films of 1968
