= List of Kannada films of 1964 =

== Top-grossing films ==
Rank	Title	Collection	Ref.
1.	Chandavalliya Thota	₹55 lakh (₹45 crore in 2025)	
2.	Aamarashilpi Jakanachari	₹50 lakh (₹38 crore in 2025)	

== List ==
The following is a list of films produced in the Kannada film industry in India in 1964, presented in alphabetical order.

Title	Director	Cast	Music director	Producer
Amarashilpi Jakanachari	B. S. Ranga	Kalyan Kumar, Rajaashankar, B. Saroja Devi	S. Rajeswara Rao	B. S. Ranga
Annapoorna	Aaruru Pattabhi	K. S. Ashwath, Pandari Bai, Rajkumar, Mynavathi	Rajan–Nagendra	Pandari Bai
Chandavalliya Thota	T. V. Singh	Rajkumar, Jayanthi, Udaya Kumar	T. G. Lingappa	T. N. Srinivasan
Chinnada Gombe	B. R. Panthulu	B. R. Panthulu, M. V. Rajamma, Kalyan Kumar	T. G. Lingappa	B. R. Panthulu
Kalaavati	T. V. Singh	Udaya Kumar, G. V. Latha, Advani Lakshmi Devi	G. K. Venkatesh	A. C. Narsimha Murthy
Kavaleredu Kulavandu	T. V. Singh	Udaya Kumar, Ramesh, Jayanthi	G. K. Venkatesh	A. C. Narasimha
Mane Aliya	S. K. A. Chari	Kalyan Kumar, Jayalalithaa, Narasimaraju	T. Chalapathi Rao	A. V. Subba Rao
Mangala Muhurta	M. R. Vittal	Rajaashankar, K. S. Ashwath, Harini	Rajan–Nagendra	U. Subba Rao
Muriyada Mane	Y. R. Swamy	Rajkumar, Jayanthi, Indrani	Vijaya	G. H. Veeranna
Naandi	N. Lakshminarayan	Rajkumar, Harini, Kalpana	Vijaya Bhaskar	Vadiraj-Jawahar
Navajeevana	T. V. Singh	K. S. Ashwath, Sudarshan, Narasimharaju	Rajan–Nagendra	Vadiraj-Jawahar
Navakoti Narayana	S. K. A. Chari	Rajkumar, Sowkar Janaki, Ramachandra Shastry	Shivaprasad	D. R. Naidu
Pathiye Daiva	R. Nagendra Rao	R. Nagendra Rao, R. N. Sudarshan, Kalpana	Vijaya Bhaskar	R. Nagendra Rao
Post Master	G. V. Iyer	B. M. Venkatesh, G. V. Shivaraj, Vandana	Vijaya Bhaskar	G. V. Iyer
Prathigne	B. S. Ranga	Rajkumar, K. S. Ashwath, Jayanthi	S. Hanumantha	B. S. Ranga
Shivagange Mahathme	Govindayya	Rajkumar, Udaya Kumar, Balakrishna	G. K. Raghu	J. C. Thimmarayappa
Shivarathri Mahathme	P. R. Kaundinya	Rajkumar, Leelavathi, K. S. Ashwath	Shivaprasad	S. S. Raju
Thumbida Koda	N. C. Rajan	Rajkumar, K. S. Ashwath, Leelavathi, Jayanthi	G. K. Venkatesh	G. K. Venkatesh
Veera Sankalpa	Hunsur Krishnamurthy	Hunsur Krishnamurthy, M. S. Acharya, B. M. Venkatesh	Rajan–Nagendra	Hunusur Krishnamurthy

== See also ==
- Kannada films of 1963
- Kannada films of 1965
