= List of Kannada films of 1966 =

== Top-grossing films ==
Rank	Title	Collection	Ref.
1.	Mantralaya Mahathme	₹70 lakh (₹44.1 crore in 2025)	

== List ==
The following is a list of films produced in the Kannada film industry in India in 1966, presented in alphabetical order.

Title	Director	Cast	Music director	Producer
Baala Nagamma	P. R. Kaundinya	Rajkumar, Kalpana, Udaya Kumar	S. Rajeswara Rao	Vikram Srinivas
Badukuva Daari	K. S. Prakash Rao	Kalyan Kumar, Jayalalithaa, Udaya Kumar	T. Chalapati Rao	A. S. R. Aanjaneyulu
Deva Maanava	C. P. Jambu	B. V. Radha, Jayanti, Udaya Kumar	S. M. Subbaiah	Raavana
Dudde Doddappa	B. R. Panthulu	B. R. Panthulu, Bharathi, Ramesh	T. G. Lingappa	B. R. Panthulu
Emme Thammanna	B. R. Panthulu	Rajkumar, Bharathi, M. V. Rajamma	T. G. Lingappa	B. R. Panthulu
Endu Ninnavane	Kalyan Kumar	Kalyan Kumar, Lathadevi, Jayanthi	Rajan–Nagendra	Kalyan Kumar
Katari Veera	Y. R. Swamy	Rajkumar, Udaya Chandrika, Udaya Kumar	Upendra Kumar	T. Vasanna
Kiladi Ranga	G. V. Iyer	Rajkumar, Jayanti, B. V. Radha	G. K. Venkatesh	B. S. Ranga
Love in Bangalore	M. Sampath	Kalyan Kumar, Bharathi, Narasimharaju	S. P. Kodandapaani	S. Heera
Madhu Malathi	S. K. A.Chari	Rajkumar, Bharathi, Udaya Kumar	G. K. Venkatesh	M. Sampath
Mahaashilpi	S. V. Doraiswamy	H. B. Jwalanaiah, K. S. Ashwath, Jayanthi	P.Kalinga Rao	H. B. Aadirajaiah
Mamatheya Bandhana	B. S. Narayan	B. M. Venkatesh, Jayanthi, Dwarakish	Satyam	Dwarakish
Mane Katti Nodu	Sri Sadguru	Dwarakish, Prabhakar, Udaya Kumar	R. Ratna	C. V. Shivashankar
Mantralaya Mahatme	T. V. Singh Thakur	Rajkumar, Jayanthi, Udaya Kumar	Rajan–Nagendra	T. V. Singh Thakur, Dorai–Bhagavan
Mohini Bhasmasura	S. S. Verma	Rajkumar, Leelavathi, Udaya Kumar	T. Chalapati Rao	T. Madaar
Premamayi	M. R. Vittal	Rajkumar, Leelavathi, K. S. Ashwath	R. Sudarshan	Srikanth Nahata
Sandhya Raga	A. C. Narasimha	Rajkumar, Bharathi, Udaya Kumar	G. K. Venkatesh	A. C. Narasimha
Sri Kanyaka Parameshwari Kathe	Hunsur Krishnamurthy	Rajkumar, Pandari Bai, B. M. Venkatesh	G. K. Venkatesh	Hunusur Krishnamurthy
Subba Shastry	M. V. Krishnaswamy	Kalyan Kumar, K. S. Ashwath, Harini	Veena Doraiswamy	M. V. Krishnaswsamy
Thoogudeepa	K. S. L. Swamy	Rajkumar, Leelavathi, Narasimharaju	Vijaya Bhaskar	R. G. Keshava Murthy

== See also ==
- Kannada films of 1965
- Kannada films of 1967
