= Pandari Bai filmography =

Pandari Bai (18 September 1928 – 29 January 2003) was an Indian actress who worked in South Indian cinema, mostly in Kannada cinema during the 1950s, 1960s and 1970s. She is considered Kannada cinema's first successful heroine. She has acted as both heroine and mother to stalwarts such as Rajkumar, M. G. Ramachandran, Sivaji Ganesan. She was the heroine in Rajkumar's debut movie Bedara Kannappa and also Sivaji's debut movie Parasakthi. She has acted in over 1,000 films in Kannada, Tamil, Telugu and Hindi. Bai was honoured by Kalaimamani from the Tamil Nadu government. The following is a complete list of her films:

== Films ==
| Year | Title | Role | Language |
|---|---|---|---|
| 1943 | Vani | | Kannada |
| 1944 | Haridas | | Tamil |
| 1947 | Bhakta Gora Kumbhara | | Tamil |
| 1948 | Vedhala Ulagam | Kali Devi | Tamil |
| 1949 | Bahar | Malti | Hindi |
| 1950 | Raja Vikrama | Padmini | Tamil; Kannada |
| 1951 | Marmayogi | Vasantha | Tamil |
| 1952 | Parasakthi | Vimala | Tamil |
| 1953 | Gumastha | Susheela | Tamil |
| 1953 | Gunasagari | Gunasagari | Kannada |
| 1953 | Pardesi | Susheela | Tamil |
| 1953 | Paradesi | | Telugu |
| 1953 | Poongothai | | Tamil |
| 1953 | Thirumbi Paar | Poomalai | Tamil |
| 1953 | Kangal | | Tamil |
| 1954 | Andha Naal | Usha | Tamil |
| 1954 | Bedara Kannappa | Neela | Kannada |
| 1954 | Manohara | Padmavathi | Tamil |
| 1954 | Manohara | Padmavathi | Telugu |
| 1954 | Nallakalam | | Tamil |
| 1955 | Sodari | Hemavati | Kannada |
| 1955 | Bhakta Mallikarjuna | | Kannada |
| 1955 | Santha Sakku | | Kannada |
| 1955 | Chella Pillai | Anjalai | Tamil |
| 1955 | Vadina | Chitti | Telugu |
| 1955 | Shiv Bhakta | | Hindi |
| 1956 | Bhakta Vijaya | Hema | Kannada |
| 1956 | Hari Bhakta | Lakshmi | Kannada |
| 1956 | Kula Deivam | Shanta | Tamil |
| 1956 | Renuka Mahatme | | Kannada |
| 1956 | Shantha Sakkubai | | Tamil (dubbed from Kannada) |
| 1957 | Bhabhi | Shanta | Hindi |
| 1957 | Rayara Sose | Geetha | Kannada |
| 1957 | Sati Nalaayini | Nalayini | Kannada |
| 1958 | Anbu Engey | Amudha | Tamil |
| 1958 | Maalaiyitta Mangai | Sarasu | Tamil |
| 1958 | Annaiyin Aanai | Gowri | Tamil |
| 1958 | Panchayat | Maya | Hindi |
| 1959 | Alli Petra Pullai | | Tamil |
| 1959 | Aval Yaar | Mahalakshmi | Tamil |
| 1959 | Chand | Kamla | Hindi |
| 1959 | Abba Aa Hudugi | Jyoti | Kannada |
| 1959 | Engal Kula Daivi | | Tamil |
| 1959 | Grihalakshmi | | Hindi |
| 1959 | Naalu Veli Neelam | | Tamil |
| 1959 | Nattukoru Nallavan | | Tamil |
| 1959 | Paigham | Parvati Ratan Lal | Hindi |
| 1959 | Paththarai Maathu Thangam | | Tamil |
| 1959 | Uthami Petra Rathinam | | Tamil |
| 1960 | Anbukkor Anni | | Tamil |
| 1960 | Bhaktha Sabari | | Tamil/Telugu/Kannada |
| 1960 | Irumbu Thirai | | Tamil |
| 1960 | Ivan Avanethan | | Tamil |
| 1960 | Kuravanji | | Tamil |
| 1960 | Paavai Vilakku | | Tamil |
| 1960 | Raja Bhakti | Princess Devasena | Tamil |
| 1960 | Thanthaikupin Thamayan | | Tamil |
| 1962 | Punithavathi | | Tamil |
| 1962 | Indira En Selvam | | Tamil |
| 1962 | Thejaswini | | Kannada |
| 1963 | Jenu Goodu | Shantha | Kannada |
| 1963 | Sri Sivarathri | | |
| 1963 | Sri Ramanjaneya Yuddha | | Kannada |
| 1963 | Santha Thukaram | | Kannada |
| 1964 | Thaayin Madiyil | Parvathi | Tamil |
| 1964 | Dheiva Thaai | | Tamil |
| 1964 | Annapoorna | Annapoorna | Kannada |
| 1964 | Shree Guruvayoorappan | | Malayalam |
| 1964 | Pratigne | | Kannada |
| 1964 | Pathiye Daiva | | Kannada |
| 1964 | Navajeevana | | Kannada |
| 1964 | Muriyada Mane | Shanti | Kannada |
| 1964 | Annapoorna | | Kannada |
| 1965 | Satya Harishchandra | Chandramathi, wife of Raja Harishchandra | Kannada |
| 1965 | Enga Veettu Pillai | Susila | Tamil |
| 1965 | C.I.D. | Parvathi | Telugu |
| 1965 | Nee | | Tamil |
| 1965 | Poojaikku Vandha Malar | Suresh's mother | Tamil |
| 1965 | Satya Harishchandra | | Telugu |
| 1965 | Mahasathi Anasuya | Anasuya | Kannada |
| 1965 | Maha Sathi | | |
| 1965 | Chandrahasa | | Kannada |
| 1965 | Bettada Huli | Parvati | Kannada |
| 1966 | Chandhrodhayam | Lakshmi | Tamil |
| 1966 | Motor Sundaram Pillai | | Tamil |
| 1966 | Sri Kanyaka Parameshwari Kathe | Queen of Raja Vishnuvardhana | Kannada |
| 1966 | Sandhya Raga | Meenakshi | Kannada |
| 1966 | Laadla | Seeta | Hindi |
| 1967 | Selva Magal | Parvathi | Tamil |
| 1967 | Kaavalkaaran | | Tamil |
| 1967 | Penn Endral Penn | | Tamil |
| 1967 | Belli Moda | Lalithamma | Kannada |
| 1967 | Sri Purandara Dasaru | | Kannada |
| 1967 | Punyavathi | Parvathi | Telugu |
| 1967 | Premalopramadam | | Telugu |
| 1967 | Anuradha | Nagu | Kannada |
| 1967 | Raaz | | Hindi |
| 1968 | Jeevanaamsam | Meenakshi | Tamil |
| 1968 | En Thambi | Meenakshi | Tamil |
| 1968 | Kudiyirundha Koyil | | Tamil |
| 1968 | Pudhiya Bhoomi | | Tamil |
| 1968 | Anbu Vazhi | | Tamil |
| 1968 | Palamanasulu | | Telugu |
| 1968 | Amma | | Kannada |
| 1969 | Anbalippu | | Tamil |
| 1969 | Bhale Abbayilu | Lakshmi | Telugu |
| 1969 | Adimaippenn | Abirami Mangamma | Tamil |
| 1969 | Nam Naadu | Bakiyum | Tamil |
| 1969 | Deiva Magan | Parvathi | Tamil |
| 1969 | Suvarna Bhoomi | | Kannada |
| 1969 | Odahuttidavaru | | Kannada |
| 1969 | Nanha Farishta | | Hindi |
| 1969 | Namma Makkalu | | Kannada |
| 1969 | Manashanti | | Kannada |
| 1969 | Madhura Milana | | Kannada |
| 1969 | Gejje Pooje | Tangamma | Kannada |
| 1969 | Chowkada Deepa | | Kannada |
| 1969 | Bhagirathi | | Kannada |
| 1970 | Nadu Iravil | Ponni | Tamil |
| 1970 | Nadu Iravil | Ponni | Tamil |
| 1970 | Muru Muttugalu | | Kannada |
| 1970 | Bhale Jodi | | Kannada |
| 1970 | Aparajithe | | Kannada |
| 1971 | Iru Thuruvam | Annapoorani | Tamil |
| 1971 | Oru Thaai Makkal | Parvathi | Tamil |
| 1971 | Sabatham | Lakshmi | Tamil |
| 1971 | Sampoorna Ramayanam | | Telugu |
| 1971 | Pratidwani | Meenakshi | Kannada |
| 1971 | Namma Baduku | | Kannada |
| 1971 | Mahadimane | | Kannada |
| 1971 | Ganga Tera Pani Amrit | | Hindi |
| 1971 | Bhale Rani | | Kannada |
| 1971 | Bandhavya | | Kannada |
| 1971 | Anugraha | | Kannada |
| 1971 | Rakhwala | | Hindi |
| 1972 | Raja | Parvathi | Tamil |
| 1972 | Thavapudhalavan | Rajalakshmi | Tamil |
| 1972 | Annamitta Kai | | Tamil |
| 1972 | Vasantha Maligai | Latha's Mother | Tamil |
| 1972 | Dhakam | | Tamil |
| 1972 | ...Aval! | | Tamil |
| 1972 | Thavapudhalavan | Rajalakshmi | Tamil |
| 1972 | Shehzada | | Hindi |
| 1972 | Rivaaj | Shekhar's Mother | Hindi |
| 1972 | Ranganna Sabatham | | Tamil |
| 1972 | Pandanti Kapuram | Chinnamma | Telugu |
| 1972 | Nijam Nirupistha | | Telugu |
| 1972 | Mathru Murthi | | Telugu |
| 1972 | Marapurani Talli | | Telugu |
| 1972 | Kodalu Pilla | | Telugu |
| 1972 | Hrudaya Sangama | | Kannada |
| 1972 | Apna Desh | Mrs. Dinanath Chandra | Hindi |
| 1972 | Dhakam | | Tamil |
| 1972 | Daiva Sankalpam | | Telugu |
| 1972 | Bandagi | Sita | Hindi |
| 1973 | Gowravam | Chellamma | Tamil |
| 1973 | Neramu Siksha | Santamma | Telugu |
| 1973 | Nee Ulla Varai | | Tamil |
| 1973 | Hemareddy Mallamma | | Kannada |
| 1973 | Gauravam | Chellamma | Tamil |
| 1974 | Thirumangalyam | | Tamil |
| 1974 | Thaaipiranthal | | Tamil |
| 1974 | Paadha Poojai | | Tamil |
| 1974 | Netru Indru Naalai | Kanaga | Tamil |
| 1974 | Bangaarada Panjara | | Kannada |
| 1974 | Onne Onnu Kanne Kannu | | Tamil |
| 1974 | Ramaiah Thandri | | Telugu |
| 1974 | Peddalu Marali | | Telugu |
| 1974 | Krishnaveni | Satyanarayana's elder sister | Telugu |
| 1974 | Janma Rahasya | | Kannada |
| 1974 | Gumasthavin Magal | Thiruppurasundari | Tamil |
| 1974 | Devadasu | Sharada Devi | Telugu |
| 1974 | Avalum Penn Dhaney | | Tamil |
| 1974 | Alluri Seetarama Raju | | Telugu |
| 1975 | Moguda Pellama | | Telugu |
| 1975 | Dr. Siva | | Tamil |
| 1975 | Idhayakkani | | Tamil |
| 1975 | Pallandu Vazhga | | Tamil |
| 1975 | Thota Ramudu | | Telugu |
| 1975 | Santhanam Saubhagyam | | Telugu |
| 1975 | Ramuni Minchina Ramudu | Ramu's sister | Telugu |
| 1975 | Raktha Sambandhalu | | Telugu |
| 1975 | Puttinti Gauravam | | Telugu |
| 1975 | Pattikkaattu Raja | Maria | Tamil |
| 1975 | Padmaragam | | Malayalam |
| 1975 | Moguda Pellamma | | Telugu |
| 1975 | Kathanayakuni Katha | Parvathi | Telugu |
| 1975 | Idhayakkani | Mohan's mother | Tamil |
| 1975 | Dr. Siva | Lakshmi | Tamil |
| 1975 | Asthi Kosam | | Telugu |
| 1975 | Anna Dammula Katha | | Telugu |
| 1976 | Uthaman | | Tamil |
| 1976 | Uzhaikkum Karangal | | Tamil |
| 1976 | Muthyala Pallaki | Poorna | Telugu |
| 1976 | Uzhaikkum Karangal | Annam | Tamil |
| 1976 | Uththaman | Gopi's mother | Tamil |
| 1976 | Swami Drohulu | | Telugu |
| 1976 | Seetamma Santhanam | | Telugu |
| 1976 | Raju Vedale | | Telugu |
| 1976 | Perum Pugazhum | | Tamil |
| 1976 | Neram Nadi Kadu Akalidi | | Telugu |
| 1976 | Muthyala Pallaki | Murali's mother | Telugu |
| 1976 | Muthana Muthallavo | | Tamil |
| 1976 | Mugiyada Kathe | | Kannada |
| 1976 | Maa Daivam | Raju's mother | Telugu |
| 1976 | Lalitha | Shankar's Aunt | Tamil |
| 1976 | Kaenelum Collectorum | | Malayalam |
| 1976 | Etharkum Thuninthavan | | Tamil |
| 1976 | Bangaru Manishi | Seeta | Telugu |
| 1976 | Bhadrakali | | Tamil |
| 1976 | Athirshtam Azhaikkirathu | | Tamil |
| 1976 | America Ammayi | Janaki | Telugu |
| 1976 | Ramarajyamlo Rakthapasam | | Telugu |
| 1977 | Avan Oru Sarithiram | Lakshmi | Tamil |
| 1977 | Eenati Bandham Yenatido | Shantha | Telugu |
| 1977 | Adavi Ramudu | | Telugu |
| 1977 | Indru Pol Endrum Vaazhga | | Tamil |
| 1977 | Janma Janmala Bandham | | Telugu |
| 1977 | Uyarnthavargal | | Tamil |
| 1977 | Thani Kudithanam | | Tamil |
| 1977 | Thaaliya Salangaiya | | Tamil |
| 1977 | Avan Oru Sarithiram | Lakshmi | Tamil |
| 1977 | Seeta Rama Vanavasam | | Telugu |
| 1977 | Punniyam Seithaval | | Tamil |
| 1977 | Punitha Anthoniar | | Tamil |
| 1977 | Palabishegham | Meenakshi | Tamil |
| 1977 | Oke Raktham | | Telugu |
| 1977 | Manavadi Kosam | | Telugu |
| 1977 | Maa Iddari Katha | | Telugu |
| 1977 | Geetha Sangeetha | | Telugu |
| 1977 | Eenati Bandham Yenatido | | Telugu |
| 1977 | Dongalaku Donga | | Telugu |
| 1977 | Aaru Pushpangal | Malliga and Kumutha's mother | Tamil |
| 1978 | Kalanthakulu | Annapurna | Telugu |
| 1978 | Dongala Veta | Lakshmi | Telugu |
| 1978 | Sahasavanthudu | Lakshmi, Raghu's mother | Telugu |
| 1978 | Vazhthungal | | Tamil |
| 1978 | Unakkum Vazhvu Varum | | Tamil |
| 1978 | Taxi Driver | | Tamil |
| 1978 | Swarg Narak | | Hindi |
| 1978 | Swargaseema | | Telugu |
| 1978 | Sahasavantudu | | Telugu |
| 1978 | Prema Chesina Pelli | | Telugu |
| 1978 | Oru Veedu Oru Ulagam | | Tamil |
| 1978 | Nindu Manishi | | Telugu |
| 1978 | Moodu Puvvulu Aaru Kayalu | | Telugu |
| 1978 | Makkal Kural | | Tamil |
| 1978 | Lawyer Viswanath | Shanthamma | Telugu |
| 1978 | Lambadolla Ramadasu | | Telugu |
| 1978 | Kungumam Kathai Solgirathu | | Tamil |
| 1978 | Kamatchiyin Karunai | | Tamil |
| 1978 | Kalanthakulu | | Telugu |
| 1978 | Dudubasavanna | | Telugu |
| 1978 | Dongala Veta | | Telugu |
| 1978 | Devadasi | | Kannada |
| 1978 | Sadhurangam | Sundaresan and Ram Kumar's mother | Tamil |
| 1978 | Bandhipotu Mutha | | |
| 1979 | Naan Vazhavaippen | Ravi's Mother | Tamil |
| 1979 | Hema Hemeelu | Rajeswari Devi | Telugu |
| 1979 | Vetagadu | Ayah | Telugu |
| 1979 | Srungara Ramudu | Jaya | Telugu |
| 1979 | Sankhu Teertham | | Telugu |
| 1979 | Priya Bandhavi | | Telugu |
| 1979 | Naan Vazhavaippen | Lakshmi | Tamil |
| 1979 | Khiladi Krishnudu | | Telugu |
| 1979 | Kadamai Nenjam | | Tamil |
| 1979 | Dongalaku Saval | | Telugu |
| 1979 | Burripalem Bullodu | | Telugu |
| 1979 | Laxmi Pooja | | Telugu |
| 1979 | Sommokadidhi Sokokadidhi | Parvathi | Telugu |
| 1979 | Lok Parlok | | Hindi |
| 1980 | Kiladi Krishnudu | Sãnthamma | Telugu |
| 1980 | Mahalakshmi | Shankaram's mother | Telugu |
| 1980 | Naan Potta Savaal | | Tamil/Telugu |
| 1980 | Yamanukku Yaman | Sathyamoorthy's mother | Tamil |
| 1980 | Triloka Sundari | | Telugu |
| 1980 | Superman | Sarada | Telugu |
| 1980 | Sardar Paparayudu | Sardar Paparayudu's mother | Telugu |
| 1980 | Rama Parushurama | | Kannada |
| 1980 | Pennukku Yar Kaval | | Tamil |
| 1980 | Ram Robert Rahim | Lakshmi's Grand Mother | Telugu |
| 1980 | Mother | | Kannada |
| 1980 | Guru | Sujatha's mother | Tamil/Telugu |
| 1980 | Gajadonga | | Telugu |
| 1980 | Dharma Chakram | | Telugu |
| 1980 | Bangaru Lakshmi | | Telugu |
| 1980 | Kottapeta Rowdy | Krishna's mother | Telugu |
| 1980 | Jyoti Bane Jwala | | Hindi |
| 1981 | Taxi Driver | | Telugu |
| 1981 | Sathya Sundharam | | Tamil |
| 1981 | Ram Lakshman | Meenakshi | Tamil |
| 1981 | Ramakrishnamanulu | | Telugu |
| 1981 | Oru Iravu Oru Paravai | | Tamil |
| 1981 | Main Aur Mera Haathi | | Hindi |
| 1981 | Keralida Simha | Savitri | Kannada |
| 1981 | Kanneer Pookkal | | Tamil |
| 1981 | Daari Thappinete Manishi | | Telugu |
| 1981 | Chhaya | | Kannada |
| 1981 | Antha | Sushil's Mother | Kannada |
| 1981 | Yeh Rishta Na Tootay | | Hindi |
| 1981 | Chattaniki Kallu Levu | Vijay and Durga's mother | Telugu |
| 1982 | Radha My Darling | | Telugu |
| 1982 | Vayyari Bhamalu Vagalamari Bhartalu | Shantamma | Telugu |
| 1982 | Bandhalu Anubandhalu | | Telugu |
| 1982 | Kalavari Samsaram | Kanthamma | Telugu |
| 1982 | Chalisuva Modagalu | Sheela's mother | Kannada |
| 1982 | Ajit | | Kannada |
| 1982 | Thyagi | | Tamil |
| 1983 | Mayagadu | Janaki | Telugu |
| 1983 | Vellai Roja | Peter and Mary's Mother | Tamil |
| 1983 | Sri Ranga Neethulu | Janaki | Telugu |
| 1983 | Sasthi Viratam | | Tamil |
| 1983 | Saatchi | | Tamil |
| 1983 | Raghu Ramudu | | Telugu |
| 1983 | Raagangal Maaruvathillai | | Tamil |
| 1983 | Pralaya Garjanai | | Telugu |
| 1983 | Palletoori Pidugu | | Telugu |
| 1983 | Mayagadu | | Telugu |
| 1983 | Malargalile Aval Malligal | | Tamil |
| 1983 | Lalitha | | |
| 1983 | Kaliyuga Daivam | | Telugu |
| 1983 | Ennai Paar Enn Azhagai Paar | | Tamil |
| 1983 | Dharma Poratam | | Telugu |
| 1983 | Amayakudu Kadhu Asadhyudu | | Telugu |
| 1983 | Amarajeevi | | Telugu |
| 1983 | Adadani Saval | | Telugu |
| 1984 | Vetri | | Tamil |
| 1984 | Apoorva Sangama | | Kannada |
| 1984 | Koteeswarudu | Shanthamma | Telugu |
| 1984 | Vetri | Vijay's mother | Tamil |
| 1984 | Babulugaadi Debba | | Telugu |
| 1984 | Vasantha Geetam | Parvathi | Telugu |
| 1984 | Naga Bhairava | | Telugu |
| 1984 | Amayakudu Kadu Aggi Bharothalu | | Telugu |
| 1985 | Pudhu Yugam | | Tamil |
| 1985 | Ooriki Soggadu | Susheela | Telugu |
| 1985 | Ketti Melam | Periya Sethupathi's wife | Tamil |
| 1985 | Andha Oru Nimidam | | Tamil |
| 1985 | Arthamulla Aasaigal | | Tamil |
| 1985 | Sri Raghavendrar | | Tamil |
| 1985 | Ragile Gundelu | | Telugu |
| 1985 | Pudhu Yugam | | Tamil |
| 1985 | Nyayada Kannu | | Telugu |
| 1985 | Mel Maruvathur Adi Parasakthi | | Tamil |
| 1985 | Hosa Neeru | Bhavana's mother | Kannada |
| 1986 | Anuraga Aralithu | Shankar's mother | Kannada |
| 1986 | Pasuputhadu | | Telugu |
| 1986 | Manavudu Danavudu | | Telugu |
| 1986 | Sri Vemana Charithra | | Telugu |
| 1987 | Shruthi Seridaaga | Murthy's mother | Kannada |
| 1987 | Marana Sasanam | | Telugu |
| 1988 | Ukku Sankellu | | Telugu |
| 1988 | Donga Ramudu | | Telugu |
| 1988 | Collector Vijaya | | Telugu |
| 1989 | Sahasame Naa Oopiri | | Telugu |
| 1989 | Gaduggayi | Parvathi | Telugu |
| 1989 | Pinni | | Telugu |
| 1989 | Ayyappa Swamy Mahatyam | | Telugu |
| 1989 | Samsara Nouke | Parvathi | Kannada |
| 1990 | Prajala Manishi | Jhansi's mother | Telugu |
| 1990 | Padmavathi Kalyanam | | Telugu |
| 1990 | Ramarajyadalli Rakshasaru | | Kannada |
| 1991 | Sri Yedukondala Swamy | | Telugu |
| 1991 | Srisaila Bhramarambika Kataksham | | Telugu |
| 1992 | Mannan | Krishnan's mother | Tamil |
| 1992 | Jeevana Chaitra | Vishwanathaiah's mother | Kannada |
| 1992 | Gruhalakshmi | | Kannada |
| 1993 | Aakasmika | Narasimha Murthy's mother | Kannada |
| 1993 | Manikantana Mahime | | Kannada |
| 1993 | Tholi Muddu | | Telugu |
| 1993 | Bhagavan Sri Saibaba | Bayaji | Kannada |
| 1994 | Jai Hind | Annai Maria Devi | Tamil |
| 1994 | Haalunda Thavaru | Jyoti's mother | Kannada |
| 1994 | Mahashakti Maye | | Kannada |
| 2000 | Hats Off India | | Kannada |
| 2006 | Savira Mettilu | | Kannada |
