= List of Kannada films of the 1960s =

The following are lists of Kannada feature films released in the 1960s.

- List of Kannada films of 1960
- List of Kannada films of 1961
- List of Kannada films of 1962
- List of Kannada films of 1963
- List of Kannada films of 1964
- List of Kannada films of 1965
- List of Kannada films of 1966
- List of Kannada films of 1967
- List of Kannada films of 1968
- List of Kannada films of 1969

== See also ==
- Kannada cinema
