= Rathna Manjari =

- Directed by: Hunsur Krishnamurthy
- Written by: Hunsur Krishnamurthy
- Screenplay by: Hunsur Krishnamurthy
- Produced by: Hunsur Krishnamurthy; D. Puttaswamy
- Starring: Udaykumar; Narasimharaju; K. S. Ashwath; C. V. Shivashankar; Leelavathi; Rajasree
- Cinematography: R. Madhu
- Edited by: P. S. Murthy
- Music by: Rajan–Nagendra
- Production company: Evergreen Productions
- Distributed by: Evergreen Productions
- Release date: 15 January 1962
- Country: India
- Language: Kannada

Rathna Manjari is a 1962 Indian Kannada-language film, directed and produced by Hunsur Krishnamurthy, with D. Puttaswamy serving as co-producer. The film stars Udaykumar, Narasimharaju, K. S. Ashwath and C. V. Shivashankar, with a musical score composed by Rajan–Nagendra. H.R. Bhargava served as the assistant director of this film. The film was later dubbed in Telugu under the title Maya Mohini and into Tamil with the same title, both released in 1962.

== Cast ==
- Udaykumar
- Narasimharaju
- K. S. Ashwath
- C. V. Shivashankar
- M. P. Shankar
- Subbanna
- Sriranga
- B. Hanumanthachar
- H. R. Shastry
- Krishna Shastry
- Hanumantha Rao
- Sorat Ashwath
- Girimaji
- Leelavathi
- Harini
- Rajasree
- M. N. Lakshmi Devi
- M. Jayashree
- Shanthamma
- Master Hunasur Siriprasad

== Soundtrack ==
The music was composed by T. G. Lingappa.

| No. | Song | Singers | Lyrics | Length (m:ss) |
|---|---|---|---|---|
| 1 | "Yaaru Yaaru Ni Yaaru" | Nagendra, Jamuna Rani | Hunsur Krishnamurthy | 03:14 |
| 2 | "Karuniso Nagaraja" | | Hunsur Krishnamurthy | |
| 3 | "Gili Gili Gilakku" | S. Janaki | Hunsur Krishnamurthy | |
| 4 | "Sirivarana Dayadinda" | | Hunsur Krishnamurthy | |
| 5 | "Jayahe Jeevanadodeya" | P. B. Srinivas | Hunsur Krishnamurthy | 02:54 |
| 6 | "Nalla Ninnu Suttu" | Jikki | Hunsur Krishnamurthy | 03:16 |
| 7 | "Thumbu Yavvana" | Jikki | Hunsur Krishnamurthy | 03:08 |
