= Kaveri (1975 film) =

- Directed by: H. N. Reddy
- Written by: B. Y. Ramadas (dialogues)
- Screenplay by: B. Y. Ramadas
- Story by: B. Y. Ramadas
- Produced by: H. N. Reddy
- Starring: Bharathi; Rajesh; Pandari Bai; Kumari Surekha
- Cinematography: D. V. Rajaram; Vijayashree Nanjappa
- Edited by: Jesudas
- Music by: M. Ranga Rao
- Production company: Sri Sharada Cine Productions
- Distributed by: Sri Sharada Cine Productions
- Release date: 30 July 1975
- Running time: 132 min
- Country: India
- Language: Kannada

Kaveri is a 1975 Indian Kannada-language film, directed and produced by H. N. Reddy. The film stars Bharathi, Rajesh, Pandari Bai and Kumari Surekha. The film has musical score by M. Ranga Rao.

== Cast ==
- Bharathi
- Rajesh
- Pandari Bai
- Kumari Surekha
- K. S. Ashwath
- T. N. Balakrishna
- Sampath
- Venkatarao Thalageri
- Maluru Sonnappa
- Dr N. Narayanaswamy in Guest appearance
- B. Y. Ramadas in Guest appearance
- Chinnadagani Chalam in Guest appearance
- Srinivas in Guest appearance
- Ramachandra in Guest appearance
- H. B. Krishnappa in Guest appearance
- Gadibidi Lakkanna in Guest appearance
- Master Nagaraj in Guest appearance

== Soundtrack ==
The music was composed by M. Ranga Rao with lyrics written by Vijaya Naarasimha.

No.	Song	Singers	Length (m:ss)
1	"Jyoti Yava Jathiyamma Jagadeeshwari"	S. Janaki	03:19
2	"Shrungeri Geervaani"	P. Susheela	03:04
3	"Aakashadalli BaanaaDiyaagi"	P. B. Sreenivas, S. Janaki	03:27
4	"Ee Desha Chenna"	S. P. Balasubrahmanyam	
5	"Shilpa Chatura Kalpana"	N. S. Raman, Bangalore Latha	
