= Harini =

Harini may refer to:

- Harini (singer), South Indian film playback singer
- Harini (Kannada actress), actress in Indian Kannada cinema, active 1950–1968
- Genelia D'Souza, Indian actress, also known as Harini in Tamil cinema
- Harini Amarasuriya (born 1970), 16th Prime Minister of Sri Lanka
