= Nagarjuna (film) =

- Directed by: Y. V. Rao
- Written by: Thandra Subramanyam
- Produced by: K. N. Mallikarjuna
- Starring: G. Varalakshmi; Sandhya; Harini; Ramadevi Dr Rajkumar
- Cinematography: N. Prakash
- Edited by: K. V. Padmanabhan
- Music by: Rajan–Nagendra
- Production company: Nandi Pictures
- Distributed by: Nandi Pictures
- Release date: 27 December 1961
- Running time: 110 minutes
- Country: India
- Language: Kannada

Nagarjuna is a 1961 Indian Kannada-language film, directed by Y. V. Rao and produced by K. N. Mallikarjuna. The film stars Rajkumar, Kanta Rao, G. Varalakshmi, Sandhya, Harini and Ramadevi. The film has musical score by Rajan–Nagendra. Y. V. Rao shot the movie simultaneously in Telugu with the same name (Naagaarjuna) starring Kanta Rao. Rajkumar portrayed the role of Arjuna's son Iravan in the Telugu version. He later on went on to portray the role of Babruvahana, another of Arjuna's sons, in the 1977 movie of the same name - making him the only actor to portray the role of Arjuna and his two sons. This remains the only movie in which YV Rao directed Rajkumar - since their second collaboration Hennina Baale Kanneeru was stalled after a portion of the shoot. The dialogues were written by H.L. Narayana Rao who happens to be the father of actor Vishnuvardhan.

== Cast ==
- Dr. Rajkumar as Arjuna
- G. Varalakshmi as Uluchi
- Narasimharaju as Vathapi
- Sandhya as Parvathi
- Harini as Subhadra
- Ramadevi
- Parvathi
- Jayalakshmi
- Rajeshwari
- Kumari Meena
- Kanta Rao as Krishna
- V. Nagayya as King of Nagas
- K. S. Ashwath
- Rajanala as Anjaneya
- Srikanth
- Narayana
- Master Sathyanarayana
- Krishnappa
- M. Raghavaiah
- Shivakumar
- M. S. Manyam
- Ramaswamy
- Shankar
- Subramanyam
- V. Nagarajan
- Rajendra Prasad
- B. Jaya
- Sharada
- Premakumari
- Gangubai
- Kalavathi
- Narmadadevi

== Soundtrack ==
The music was composed by Rajan–Nagendra.

No.	Song	Singers	Lyrics	Length (m:ss)
1	"Ninnavalu Naanendu Kaaye"	P. Leela	Hunsur Krishna Murthy	05:18
