= Navajeevana =

- Directed by: P. S. Murthy
- Written by: Sorat Ashwath (dialogues)
- Screenplay by: Sorat Ashwath
- Story by: Rasavadi
- Produced by: Vadiraj; Jawahar
- Starring: K. S. Ashwath; R. N. Sudarshan; Narasimharaju; Rathnakar
- Cinematography: R. Madhu
- Edited by: P. S. Murthy
- Music by: Rajan–Nagendra
- Production company: Sri Bharathi Chithra
- Distributed by: Sri Bharathi Chithra
- Release date: 21 February 1964
- Running time: 135 min
- Country: India
- Language: Kannada

Navajeevana ( transl. The New Life) is a 1964 Indian Kannada film, directed by P. S. Murthy and produced by Vadiraj and Jawahar. The film stars K. S. Ashwath, R. N. Sudarshan, Narasimharaju and Rathnakar in the lead roles. The film has musical score by Rajan–Nagendra.

== Cast ==
- K. S. Ashwath
- R. N. Sudarshan
- Narasimharaju
- Rathnakar
- Basavaraj
- Chindodi Shivaraj
- Krishna Shastry
- Girimaji
- Vadiraj
- Pandari Bai
- Revathi
- Chindodi Leela
- Mynavathi in Guest Appearance
- Suryakala in Guest Appearance
- B. Jayashree in Guest Appearance
- Ramadevi in Guest Appearance
- Rama in Guest Appearance
- Harini in Guest Appearance
- R. Nagendra Rao in Guest Appearance
- Kemparaj Urs in Guest Appearance
- G. V. Shivaraj in Guest Appearance
- Veerabhadrappa in Guest Appearance
- Suryakumar in Guest Appearance
- Hanumanthachar in Guest Appearance
- Subbanna in Guest Appearance
- Madhu in Guest Appearance
- Babu in Guest Appearance

== Soundtrack ==
The music was composed by Rajan–Nagendra.

No.	Song	Singers	Lyrics	Length (m:ss)
1	"Ide Ide Savi Baladina"	P. B. Sreenivas, S. Janaki	Sorat Aswath	03:16
2	"Preethe Honale"	P. Susheela	Sorat Aswath	03:34
3	"Bhama Bhama"	Nagendra Rao, L. R. Eswari	Sorat Aswath	03:09
4	"Kareye Kogile"	S. Janaki	Sorat Aswath	03:10
5	"Leelamaya He Deva"	P. Susheela	Sorat Aswath	03:18
6	"Yo Yo Yaam Yaam"	P. B. Sreenivas	Sorat Aswath	02:47
