= Baalaraajana Kathe =

- Directed by: Venunath
- Starring: Kalyan Kumar; G. V. Lathadevi; Narasimharaju; Udaykumar
- Cinematography: B. N. Haridas
- Music by: S. Hanumantha Rao
- Release date: 1965
- Country: India
- Language: Kannada

Baalaraajana Kathe is a 1965 Indian Kannada film, directed by Venunath. The film stars Kalyan Kumar, G. V. Lathadevi, Narasimharaju and Udaykumar in the lead roles. The film has musical score by S. Hanumantha Rao.

== Cast ==
- Kalyan Kumar
- G. V. Lathadevi
- Narasimharaju
- Udaykumar
- B. Jayamma
