= Nanda Deepa =

- Directed by: M. R. Vittal
- Written by: P. Vadiraj
- Produced by: Vadiraj; Jawahar
- Starring: Rajkumar; Harini; Leelavathi; Udaykumar
- Cinematography: R. Madhu
- Edited by: P. S. Murthy
- Music by: M. Venkataraju
- Production company: Sri Bharathi Chitra
- Release date: 31 December 1963
- Running time: 157 minutes
- Country: India
- Language: Kannada

Nanda Deepa ( transl. Eternal flame) is a 1963 Indian Kannada-language romantic drama film, directed by M. R. Vittal in his directorial debut. The film was produced and written by actor Vadiraj with Jawahar co-producing for the Sri Bharathi Chitra studio, marking its first production. The film stars Rajkumar and Harini, with Leelavathi and Udaykumar in pivotal supporting roles.

Upon its release, the film received significant appreciation and won the National Film Award for Best Feature Film in Kannada at the 10th National Film Awards.

The film was remade in Gujarati in 1964 as Ramat Ramade Ram, making this the first Kannada film to be remade in that language. The Gujarati version starred Tarla Mehta and Mahesh Kumar in the lead role with Sanjeev Kumar reprising Udaykumar's role. While the Kannada version won the National Award, the Gujarati version garnered eight State awards.

== Cast ==
- Rajkumar as Shankar
- Udaykumar as Ravi
- Harini
- Leelavathi
- K. S. Ashwath
- Sorat Ashwath
- Narasimharaju
- Vadiraj
- Ganapathi Bhat
- Hanumanthachar
- Balakrishna in a guest appearance

== Soundtrack ==
The music was composed by M. Venkataraju, with lyrics by Sorat Ashwath. All the songs composed for the film were received extremely well and considered as evergreen songs.

Track listing
No.	Title	Lyrics	Singer(s)	Length
1.	"Yaarige Yaaro"	Sorat Ashwath	P. B. Sreenivas	03:25
2.	"Naadinanda Ee Deepavali"	Sorat Ashwath	S. Janaki, P. Leela	03:10
3.	"Ondu Goodide"	Sorat Ashwath	P. Nageshwara Rao, Jikki	02:49
4.	"Gaaligopura Ninnashatheera"	Sorat Ashwath	S. Janaki	03:15
5.	"Naliva Mana"	Sorat Ashwath	P. B. Sreenivas, S. Janaki	03:13
6.	"Kanasonda Kande"	Sorat Ashwath	S. Janaki	03:05
7.	"Nyayakke Kannilla"	Sorat Ashwath	P. Leela	03:14

== Awards ==
- 10th National Film Awards
1. National Film Award for Best Feature Film in Kannada
