= Prathigne =

- Directed by: B. S. Ranga
- Written by: Chi. Sadashivaiah (dialogues)
- Story by: Smt. Shamaladevi
- Produced by: B. S. Ranga
- Starring: Rajkumar; K. S. Ashwath; Narasimharaju; Ganapathi Bhat
- Cinematography: B. S. Ranga
- Edited by: P. G. Mohan
- Music by: S. Hanumantha Rao
- Production company: Vikram Productions
- Distributed by: Vikram Productions
- Release date: 5 October 1964
- Running time: 130 min
- Country: India
- Language: Kannada

Prathigne ( transl. Oath or Vow) is a 1964 Indian Kannada-language film, directed by B. S. Ranga and produced by B. S. Ranga. The film stars Rajkumar, K. S. Ashwath, Narasimharaju and Ganapathi Bhat. The film has musical score by S. Hanumantha Rao. This was the first movie in which Rajkumar played the role of a doctor on-screen.

== Cast ==
- Rajkumar as Dr.Shankar
- Jayanthi
- K. S. Ashwath as Mahadevayya, Shankar's father
- Pandari Bai as Gowri, Shankar's mother
- Narasimharaju
- Ganapathi Bhat
- Rathnakar
- Vijayarao
- Girimaji
- Master Babu
- Baby Shyam
- B Ramadevi
- B. Jaya
- Rama
- Baby Vishalakshi
