= B. Jaya (actress) =

Indian (Kannada-cinema) actress (1944–2021)

B. Jayamma
- Born: 3 September 1944; Kollegal, Chamarajanagar, Kingdom of Mysore (Now Karnataka)
- Died: 3 June 2021 (aged 76); Bengaluru, India
- Occupation: Actress
- Awards: Karnataka State Film Award for Best Supporting Actress

Basappa Jaya (3 September 1944 – 3 June 2021), commonly known as B. Jaya, was an Indian actress, known for her work in Kannada cinema. She acted in over 200 films before turning to Directing. For her performance in the movie Gowdru, Jaya won the Karnataka State Film Award for Best Supporting Actress in 2004-05.

== Biography ==
Jaya was born in Kollegal, a town in the present-day Chamarajanagar district of India's Karnataka State. She was the fourth of seven children to Mahadevamma and Basappa. Father Basappa was a stage artist who went on to appear in over 100 films. Jaya followed her father into the stage and subsequently into films. Beginning in the 1950s, she went to work on stage till 1992. She made her film debut as a child actress in Bhakta Prahlada (1958).

Jaya has won awards for the films Prathigne, Bettada Huli, Nyayave Devaru and Gowdru which won her the Karnataka State Film Award for Best Supporting Actress in 2004.

== Death ==
Jaya died on 3 June 2021, in Bangalore from age related ailments.

== Partial filmography ==
- Bhakta Prahlada (1958)
- Dashavathara (1960)
- Nagarjuna (1961)
- Vidhi Vilasa (1962)
- Chandra Kumaara (1963)
- Kanyarathna (1963)
- Mana Mecchida Madadi (1963)
- Sathi Shakthi (1963)
- Valmiki (1963)
- Veera Kesari (1963)
- Chinnada Gombe (1964)
- Prathigne (1964)
- Shivagange Mahathme (1964)
- Beratha Jeeva (1965)
- Bettada Huli (1965)
- Chandrahasa (1965)
- Ide Mahasudina (1965)
- Sathi Savithri (1965)
- Mantralaya Mahatme (1966)
- Premamayi (1966)
- Emme Thammanna (1966)
- Beedi Basavanna (1967)
- Bellimoda (1967)
- Gange Gowri (1967)
- Bhagyada Bagilu (1968)
- Gowri Ganda (1968)
- Mannina Maga (1968)
- Mysore Tanga (1968)
- Makkale Manege Manikya (1969)
- Namma Makkalu (1969)
- Odahuttidavaru (1969)
- Eradu Mukha (1969)
- Arishina Kumkuma (1970)
- Kallara Kalla (1970)...Jaya
- Sri Krishnadevaraya (1970)
- Baala Bandhana (1971)
- Bhale Adrushtavo Adrushta (1971)
- Hennu Honnu Mannu (1971)
- Hoo Bisilu (1971)
- Kasidre Kailasa (1971)
- Kula Gourava (1971)
- Mukthi (1971)
- Naguva Hoovu (1971)
- Nyayave Devaru (1971)
- Sri Krishna Rukmini Satyabhama (1971)
- Thayi Devaru (1971)
- Jaga Mecchida Maga (1972)
- Kulla Agent 000 (1972)
- Sipayi Ramu (1972)
- Bharathada Rathna (1973)
- Devaru Kotta Thangi (1973)
- Gandhada Gudi (1973)
- Mooruvare Vajragalu (1973)
- Swayamvara (1973)
- Bangaarada Panjara (1974)
- Sampathige Savaal (1974)
- Sri Srinivasa Kalyana (1974)
- Daari Tappida Maga (1975)
- Devara Gudi (1975)
- Mahadeshwara Pooja Phala (1975)
- Shubhamangala (1975)
- Bahaddur Gandu (1976)
- Makkala Bhagya (1976)
- Premada Kanike (1976)
- Raja Nanna Raja (1976)
- Babruvahana (1977)
- Banashankari (1977)
- Bhagyavantharu (1977)
- Giri Kanye (1977)
- Pavana Ganga (1977)
- Kiladi Kittu (1978)
- Vasantha Lakshmi (1978)
- Vamsha Jyothi (1978)
- Seetharamu (1979)
- Rahasya Rathri (1980)
- Gowdru (2004)
- Auto Shankar (2005)
- Neenello Naanalle (2006)
- Savira Mettilu (2006)
- Milana (2007)
- Hatrick Hodi Maga (2009)
- Aithalakkadi (2010)
- Murari (2015)
- Kalpana 2 (2016)
- Cinema My Darling (2016)
