= Shree Krishna Gaarudi =

- Poster
- Directed by: Hunsur Krishnamurthy
- Screenplay by: Hunsur Krishnamurthy
- Story by: Bellave Narahari Shastri
- Produced by: K. M. Naganna
- Starring: Rajkumar; Revati; Vadiraj; Narasimha Raju siddaiah swamy (actor)
- Cinematography: G. Dorai
- Edited by: Manikyam
- Music by: Pendyala Nageshwara Rao
- Production company: Nandi Pictures
- Release date: 1958
- Country: India
- Language: Kannada

Shree Krishna Gaarudi is 1958 Indian Kannada language film written and directed by Hunsur Krishnamurthy based on the story by Bellave Narahari Shastri. It narrates the tale of Bheema and Arjuna's pride being crushed by Krishna, after the Kurukshetra War. The bickering and squabbling among the Pandavas for portfolios allegorizes the politics in the then newly formed Mysore state. The movie was remade in Telugu in the same year by well-known director Y. V. Rao starring Jaggayya also titled Shri Krishna Garudi .

== Plot ==
The Kurukshetra War is over and Dharmaraya ascends the throne of Hastinavati. Dharmaraya distributes powers and Bheema and Arjuna are unhappy with the powers and responsibilities vested to them. They fume in private, that they were the reason for Pandavas victory in Kurukshetra War, but have to be subservient to nakula and sahadeva.

Sri Krishna senses this and disguises as Gaarudi, a street player, skilled in warfare. He reaches Hastinavati, challenging men to fight him. He gathers fame, as unbeatable warrior.

When news reaches Bheema and Arjuna, in a fit of rage, they challenge Gaarudi. Arjuna has to set a bow and fails. They get beaten, are pushed below earth and suffer indignity. Bheema has to fight a giant snake that has bound him and made immovable. Arjuna has to fight off a family and infamy. Both suffer, because of their pride and forgetting Lord Sri Krishna.

After what seems a long time, they pray to Krishna and are able to come over their agony.

When they reach their palace at Hastinavati, Lord Krishna informs them, it was he, as Gaarudi, who taught them the lesson.

Nakula and Sahadeva pray to Krishna, before starting the task and easily finish it off.

Shri Krishna's mighty power and bliss fills Bheema and Arjuna. They happily perform the duties, bestowed on them.

Songs by Pendyala Nageshwara Rao were popular.

== Songs ==
Bombeyaatavayyaa song in the movie turned very popular. It was written by Hunasuru Krishna Murthy and sung by P. B. Sreenivas. The song, sung by Naarada in the movie, is the telling tale of the affairs of the world. It was reused in Rajkumar's 1987 movie Shruthi Seridaaga.
