= Immadi Pulikeshi (film) =

- Directed by: N. C. Rajan
- Screenplay by: G. V. Iyer
- Based on: Life story of Pulakeshin II
- Produced by: Sri Venkatesh Chitra
- Starring: Rajkumar; Udayakumar; Jayanthi; Kalpana
- Cinematography: B. Dorairaj; Rajaram
- Edited by: N. C. Rajan; S. A. John
- Music by: G. K. Venkatesh
- Release date: 1967
- Running time: 154 minutes
- Country: India
- Language: Kannada

Immadi Pulikeshi is a 1967 Kannada-language biographical film written by G. V. Iyer and directed by N. C. Rajan. The cast includes Rajkumar, Udayakumar, Jayanthi, Kalpana and Balakrishna. The film features a soundtrack and original score composed by G. K. Venkatesh and cinematography by B. Dorairaj and Rajaram.

The film is based on the life of the renowned Kannada ruler Pulakeshin II of the Chalukya dynasty, who played a key role in expanding the dynasty across much of the Deccan region. Immadi Pulikeshi was also the 100th film of actor Balakrishna. Music composer G. K. Venkatesh produced the film under the banner Sri Venkatesh Chitra. Rajkumar portrays the title role of Immadi Pulikeshi, while Udayakumar plays Kubja Vishnuvardhana, a hunchback, and K. S. Ashwath plays the role of Harshavardhana.

V. Vijayendra Prasad, father of director S. S. Rajamouli and the story writer of Baahubali: The Beginning, revealed that he was inspired by the hero introduction sequence of Immadi Pulikeshi and incorporated a similar sequence in Baahubali: The Beginning. He also mentioned that the central storyline, where a disabled brother is denied the throne, leading to conflict between relatives, was also partly inspired by this film.

== Cast ==
- Dr. Rajkumar as Immadi Pulikeshi
- Udaykumar as Kubja Vishnuvardhana
- T. N. Balakrishna as Rahappa
- Narasimharaju as royal messenger
- R. N. Sudarshan as Buddharaja
- Arun Kumar
- Shakti Prasad as Mangalesha
- H. R. Shastry
- Ganapathi Bhat
- Keshava Murthy
- Nagappa
- Krishnappa
- Nandakumar
- Gopi
- Srikanth
- Sundar Raj (credited as Sundararajan)
- Narayana Rao
- Rajamohan
- Lakshminarayana
- Jayanthi as Padmala
- Kalpana as Vasantika
- M. N. Lakshmi Devi as Padmala's attendant
- M. R. Thilakam
- Sumithra
- M. Bhanumathi
- Chandra
- B. Jayamma as Muthabbe (cameo)
- K. S. Ashwath as Harshavardhana (cameo)

== Soundtrack ==
The songs and score were composed by G. K. Venkatesh, with lyrics written by G. V. Iyer

Sl No.	Song title	Singers
1	"Kannadada Kula Thilaka"	S. Janaki
2	"Cheluvina Odethana"	S. Janaki
3	"Thaaniralu Mane Keli"	S. Janaki
4	"Atthige Naale"	S. Janaki
5	"Kaddu Noduva Henne"	P. Susheela
