= Mahasathi Anasuya =

- Directed by: B. S. Ranga
- Written by: Chi. Udaya Shankar (dialogues)
- Screenplay by: Chi. Udaya Shankar
- Produced by: B. S. Ranga
- Starring: Rajkumar; Pandari Bai; Leelavathi; Jayanthi; Vanisri
- Cinematography: B. N. Haridas
- Edited by: P. G. Mohan; M. Devendranath; T. Chakrapani
- Music by: S. Hanumantha Rao
- Production company: Vikram Productions
- Distributed by: Vikram Productions
- Release date: 19 August 1965
- Running time: 173 minutes
- Country: India
- Language: Kannada

Mahasathi Anasuya (transl. The Virtuos Wife Anasuya) is a 1965 Indian Kannada-language film, directed and produced by B. S. Ranga. The film stars Rajkumar, Pandari Bai, Leelavathi, Jayanthi and Vanisri. The film has musical score by S. Hanumantha Rao. Rajkumar portrayed the role of god-sage Narada in the movie.

== Cast ==
- Rajkumar as Narada Muni
- K. S. Ashwath as Athri Muni as Anasuya's husband
- Pandari Bai as Anasuya
- Balakrishna as Kowshika, Sumathi's husband
- Leelavathi as Sumathi
- Narasimharaju as Thandava
- M. N. Lakshmidevi as Nagaveni
- Mynavathi in a cameo appearance as Dakshayini
- Vanisri as Saraswathi
- R. T. Rama as Lakshmi
- Jayanthi as Lavanya
- Sabithadevi
- Suryakumari
- Srikanth
- Srikantaswamy
- Suryakumar
- Krishna Shastry
- Eshwarappa
- Kupparaj
- Sanjeevan
- L. N. Swamy

== Soundtrack ==
The music was composed by Hanumantha Rao.

No.	Song	Singers	Lyrics	Length (m:ss)
1	"Narayanam Bhajare"	P. B. Sreenivas	Chi. Udaya Shankar	03:00
2	"Sreedhara Keshava Narayana"	P. B. Sreenivas	Chi. Udaya Shankar	03:23
3	"Thrimurthkala Roopa"	P. B. Sreenivas	Chi. Udaya Shankar	03:08
4	"Samanaariharu Enna"	Bangalore Latha, B. K. Sumitra, S. Janaki		
