= Bettada Huli =

- Directed by: A. V. Sheshagiri Rao
- Produced by: Bhagavati Productions
- Starring: Rajkumar; K. S. Ashwath; Jayanthi; M. P. Shankar; Udaykumar
- Cinematography: K. Janakiram
- Edited by: A. Bhaktavatsalam
- Music by: T. G. Lingappa
- Production company: Bhagavati Productions
- Release date: 1965
- Country: India
- Language: Kannada

Bettada Huli is a 1965 Kannada-language action drama film, directed and written by A. V. Sheshagiri Rao. The film was dubbed into Tamil in 1968 as Kolaikaaran Magan.

== Plot ==
A bandit, played by Udaykumar, kidnaps the pregnant wife of a policeman, K. S. Ashwath. The cop's wife gives birth to a baby boy in a bandit's custody. However, the bandit's wife later conceives a baby girl and hands the child over to Ashwath. Before her death, the bandit's wife urges Ashwath to take her daughter away from her father.

The bandit raises the boy, telling him that he is the bandit's son and that his own mother is his maternal aunt. As a result, the cop's son is brought up to be a bandit, despite his reluctance. In contrast, the bandit's daughter, grows up with a chaste upbringing but is fascinated by robbers and thieves, admiring their daring exploits.

When the boy is tasked with his first robbery, he encounters his biological father at a fair and feels an unexplained connection. He is sent to rob jewels from the cop's daughter, Jayanthi, but hesitates to carry out the act. Jayanthi, in turn, offers the jewels and plays coy before her father.

As the film progresses, the boy, now increasingly known as Bettada Kalla, faces a confrontation with his father, with only one of them able to survive. The story revolves around whether the son will discover the truth and reunite his parents.

== Cast ==
- Rajkumar as Raju
- Udaykumar as Bhairava
- Jayanthi
- Pandari Bai as Parvati
- K. S. Ashwath
- Narasimharaju
- M. P. Shankar as Kalappa
- Ganapathi Bhat as Chinnappa
- B. Jaya
- Papamma
- B. N. Geetha
- Kuppuraj
- Dinesh
- Basappa
- G. N. Shanubhog
- Shekar
- Gurusiddappa
- Ranganath

== Soundtrack ==
The music was composed by T. G. Lingappa, with lyrics by Geethapriya. All the songs composed for the film were received extremely well and considered as evergreen songs.

Track listing
No.	Title	Lyrics	Singer(s)	Length
1.	"Aaduthiruva Modagale"	Geethapriya	P. B. Sreenivas
2.	"Attheya Magale"	Geethapriya	S. Janaki, L. R. Eswari, Rudrappa
3.	"Aakashada Lokadi Doora"	Geethapriya	P. B. Sreenivas, S. Janaki
4.	"Madumagalu Naanagi"	Geethapriya	S. Janaki
5.	"Eko Ee Dina"	Geethapriya	S. Janaki

Tamil

Track listing
No.	Title	Lyrics	Singer(s)	Length
1.	"Nalla Thalaivan Pathaiyile"	K. Devanarayanan	P. B. Sreenivas
2.	"Yeno Theriyalle Yethuvum"	K. Devanarayanan	S. Janaki
3.	"Athaiyin Magale Ennadi"	K. Devanarayanan	S. Janaki, L. R. Eswari
4.	"Andha Kannanandro En Thozhan"	K. Devanarayanan	S. Janaki, P. B. Srinivas
