= Sathi Sukanya =

- Directed by: Y. R. Swamy
- Written by: M. Sriramachandra
- Produced by: D. Puttaswamy
- Starring: Rajkumar; Udaykumar; K. S. Ashwath; Rajashankar
- Cinematography: R. Madhu
- Edited by: P. S. Murthy
- Music by: Rajan–Nagendra
- Production company: Sri Bhuvaneshwari Productions
- Distributed by: Sri Bhuvaneshwari Productions
- Release date: 8 March 1967
- Country: India
- Language: Kannada

Sathi Sukanya is a 1967 Indian Kannada-language film, directed by Y. R. Swamy and produced by D. Puttaswamy. The film stars Rajkumar, Udaykumar, K. S. Ashwath and Rajashankar. The musical score was composed by Rajan–Nagendra.

== Cast ==
- Rajkumar
- Udaykumar
- K. S. Ashwath
- Rajashankar
- Narasimharaju
- Balakrishna
- M. P. Shankar
- Rathnakar
- Bangalore Nagesh
- Kupparaj
- Vidyasagar
- Srirang
- Guggu
- Maccheri
- Harini
- B. Jayashree
- Rama
- Indra
- Janaki
- Mithravinda
- Nandini
- Jyothi
