= Miss Bangalore =

1967 Indian Kannada-language film

- Directed by: P. S. Murthy
- Written by: Durai (dialogues)
- Starring: Arun Kumar; B. Vijayalakshmi; Jayanthi; Narasimharaju
- Edited by: P. S. Murthy
- Music by: P. L. Sriramulu
- Release date: 1967
- Country: India
- Language: Kannada

Miss Bangalore (Kannada: ಮಿಸ್ ಬೆಂಗಳೂರು) is a 1967 Indian Kannada film, directed by P. S. Murthy. The film stars Arun Kumar, B. Vijayalakshmi, Jayanthi and Narasimharaju in the lead roles. The film has musical score by P. L. Sriramulu.

== Cast ==
- Arun Kumar
- B. Vijayalakshmi
- Jayanthi
- Narasimharaju
