= Muddu Meena =

- Directed by: Y. R. Swamy
- Produced by: S. Heerabai
- Starring: Kalyan Kumar; Jayanthi; K. S. Ashwath; Narasimharaju
- Cinematography: R. Madhu
- Music by: G. K. Venkatesh; Upendra Kumar
- Release date: 1967
- Country: India
- Language: Kannada

Muddu Meena is a 1967 Indian Kannada film, directed by Y. R. Swamy and produced by S. Heerabai. Associate director was Kunigal Nagabhushan. The film stars Kalyan Kumar, Jayanthi, K. S. Ashwath and Narasimharaju in the lead roles. The film has musical score by G. K. Venkatesh and Upendra Kumar.

== Cast ==
- Kalyan Kumar
- Jayanthi as Meena
- K. S. Ashwath
- Narasimharaju
- M. P. Shankar

== Soundtrack ==
The music was composed by Upendra Kumar.

No.	Song	Singers	Lyrics	Length (m:ss)
1	"Ammana Madilali"	P. Leela	Ashwath	03:25
2	"Bengaloora Dundumalli"	S. Janaki	Ashwath	03:19
3	"Iduve Vidhi Leele"	K. J. Yesudas	Ashwath	03:30
4	"O Gelathi Nanna"	P. B. Sreenivas, Sumithra	Ashwath	03:28
