= Maduve Madi Nodu =

- Directed by: Hunsur Krishnamurthy
- Story by: Chakrapani
- Produced by: Nagi Reddi; Chakrapani
- Starring: Rajkumar; R. Nagendra Rao; Udaykumar; Narasimharaju
- Cinematography: Madhava Bulubule
- Edited by: G. Kalyana Sundaram; D. G. Jayaram
- Music by: Ghantasala
- Production company: Vijaya Productions Ltd.
- Release date: 17 December 1965
- Country: India
- Language: Kannada

Maduve Madi Nodu is a 1965 Indian Kannada-language film, directed by Hunsur Krishnamurthy and produced by Nagi Reddi and Chakrapani. The film stars Rajkumar, R. Nagendra Rao, Udaykumar and Narasimharaju. The film has a musical score composed by Ghantasala. It is a remake of the producer's own Telugu film Pelli Chesi Choodu (1952). The film was a profitable venture and was declared a super hit.

== Cast ==
- Rajkumar as Vasu
- R. Nagendra Rao as Venkatapathy, Vasu's father
- Udaykumar as Bheemanna
- Narasimharaju as Raju
- K. S. Ashwath as Parameshwaraiah, a politician
- H. R. Shastry as Govinda
- Rathnakar
- Hanumanthachar
- Dwarakish as Simhadri
- Satyam
- Ganapathi Bhat
- Basavaraj (credited as Master Basavaraj) as Gopi
- Leelavathi as Saraswati, Raju's sister
- Vandana
- Jayashree
- Ramadevi
- Rama
- Sarigama Viji

== Soundtrack ==
The music was composed by Ghantasala.

No.	Song	Singers	Lyrics	Length (m:ss)
1	"Maduve Maadikondu"	Ghantasala	Hunsur Krishnamurthy	05:27
2	"Yaaro Yaaro"	Ghantasala, P. Susheela	Hunsur Krishnamurthy	03:01
3	"Venkatachala"	P. Susheela	Hunsur Krishnamurthy	03:01
