= Veera Sindhoora Lakshmana =

- Directed by: Hunsur Krishnamurthy
- Screenplay by: Hunsur Krishnamurthy
- Produced by: N. Basavaraj
- Starring: Basavaraj; K. S. Ashwath; Sudheer; Vajramuni
- Cinematography: J. Sathyanarayana
- Edited by: R. Rajan
- Music by: T. G. Lingappa
- Production company: Sri Sangameshwara Productions
- Distributed by: Sri Sangameshwara Productions
- Release date: 31 October 1977
- Country: India
- Language: Kannada

Veera Sindhoora Lakshmana is a 1977 Indian Kannada film, directed by Hunsur Krishnamurthy and produced by N. Basavaraj. The film stars Basavaraj, K. S. Ashwath, Sudheer and Vajramuni in the lead roles. The film has musical score by T. G. Lingappa. The movie is based on the life of Sindhura Lakshmana.

== Cast ==
- Basavaraj
- K. S. Ashwath
- Sudheer
- Vajramuni
- Hanumanthachar
- Thipatur Siddaramaiah
- Vasantharao Nakod
- G. V. Krishna
- Ramarao Desai
- Anilraj
- Haveri Babanna
- Manjula
- Anuradha
- M. Leelavathi
- Shanthamma Belagam
- Rajalakshmi Davanagere
- Nagarathnamma
- Vanajakshi
- Therisamma
- Radha
- Rukmini
