= Post Master =

- Directed by: G. V. Iyer
- Screenplay by: G. V. Iyer
- Story by: G. V. Iyer
- Produced by: G. V. Iyer
- Starring: B. M. Venkatesh; G. V. Shivaraj; Vandhana; Balakrishna
- Cinematography: E. N. Balakrishna
- Edited by: Bhaskar
- Music by: Vijaya Bhaskar
- Production company: G. V. Iyer Productions
- Distributed by: G. V. Iyer Productions
- Release date: 2 September 1964
- Running time: 152 minutes
- Country: India
- Language: Kannada

Post Master is a 1964 Indian Kannada film, directed and produced by G. V. Iyer. The film stars B. M. Venkatesh, G. V. Shivaraj, Vandhana and Balakrishna in the lead roles. The film has musical score by Vijaya Bhaskar.

== Cast ==
- B. M. Venkatesh as Jayanna
- G. V. Shivaraj
- Vandhana
- T. N. Balakrishna as Bellulli
- B. K. Eshwarappa
- G. V. Chennabasappa
- Shivashankar
- Basavaraj
- Papamma
- Prabha
- Sharada
- Leela

== Soundtrack ==
The music was composed by Vijaya Bhaskar.

No.	Song	Singers	Lyrics	Length (m:ss)
1	"Indenu Hunnimeyo"	P. B. Sreenivas, S. Janaki	G. V. Iyer	03:29
2	"Kannadadha Kuladevi"	P. B. Sreenivas	G. V. Iyer	03:08
3	"Muttina Nattondu"	L. R. Eswari	G. V. Iyer	03:34
4	"Naaneshto Sala"	S. Janaki	G. V. Iyer	03:09
