= Anuradha (1967 film) =

- Directed by: Aruru Pattabhi
- Produced by: Pandari Bai
- Starring: Raja Shankar; Jayanthi; K. S. Ashwath; Pandari Bai
- Cinematography: R. Madhu
- Music by: Rajan-Nagendra
- Release date: 1967
- Country: India
- Language: Kannada

Anuradha is a 1967 Indian Kannada film, directed by Aruru Pattabhi and produced by Pandari Bai. The film stars Raja Shankar, Jayanthi, K. S. Ashwath and Pandari Bai in the lead roles. The film has musical score by Rajan-Nagendra. Dr. Rajkumar appeared as himself in a cameo role in this movie. This was his first guest appearance role in a movie.

== Cast ==
- Pandari Bai as Nagu
- Mynavathi as Anuradha
- B. Ramadevi as Venkamma
- K. S. Ashwath as Sadanand Rao
- Raja Shankar as Ramesh
- Narasimharaju as Subba Rao
- Bangalore Nagesh
- Jayanthi as Vimala (cameo)
- Dr.Rajkumar in a cameo

== Soundtrack ==
The music was composed by Rajan–Nagendra with lyrics written by Chi. Udayashankar.

No.	Song	Singers	Lyricist	Length (m:ss)
1	"Thooguve Rangana"	P. B. Sreenivas, P. Leela	Chi Udayshankar	02:57

2. Gummana Karayadire PBS and S Janaki Lyrics: Purandara Dasaru
