= Sathi Savithri =

- Directed by: P. R. Kaundanya
- Written by: Chi Sadashivaiah (dialogues)
- Screenplay by: Chi Sadashivaiah
- Story by: Chi Sadashivaiah
- Produced by: N. Vishweshwariah
- Starring: Rajkumar; Udaykumar; Narasimharaju; K. S. Ashwath
- Cinematography: B. N. Haridas
- Edited by: T. Chakrapani
- Music by: G. K. Venkatesh
- Production company: K V M Pictures
- Distributed by: K V M Pictures
- Release date: 1965
- Running time: 149 min
- Country: India
- Language: Kannada

Sathi Savithri is a 1965 Indian Kannada-language film, directed by P. R. Kaundanya and produced by N. Vishweshwariah. The film stars Rajkumar, Udaykumar, Narasimharaju and K. S. Ashwath. The musical score for the film was composed by G. K. Venkatesh.

== Cast ==
- Rajkumar
- Udaykumar
- Narasimharaju
- K. S. Ashwath
- B. Raghavendra Rao
- H. Ramachandra Shastry
- Krishnakumari
- B. Jayashree
- Rukmini Devi
- B. Jaya
