= Sri Purandara Dasaru =

- Directed by: C. V. Raju; R. Ramamurthy
- Screenplay by: C. V. Raju
- Produced by: Smt Jayalakshmi
- Starring: K. S. Ashwath; R. Nagendra Rao; Udaykumar; Rajashankar
- Cinematography: Rajaram; Meenakshi Sundaram
- Edited by: C. V. Raju
- Music by: C. N. Pandurangan
- Production company: Sri Hamsa Chithra
- Distributed by: Sri Hamsa Chithra
- Release date: 1967
- Running time: 171 minutes
- Country: India
- Language: Kannada

Sri Purandara Dasaru is a 1967 Indian Kannada-language film, directed by C. V. Raju and produced by Smt Jayalakshmi. The film stars K. S. Ashwath, R. Nagendra Rao, Udaykumar and Rajashankar. The musical score was composed by C. N. Pandurangan. This film is the third Kannada film based on the life of Purandara Dasa, following the 1937 film Purandaradasa and the 1964 film Navakoti Narayana.

== Cast ==
- K. S. Ashwath as Srinivasa Nayaka/Sri Purandara Daasaru
- Pandari Bai as Lakshmi wife of Purandara
- R. Nagendra Rao as Panduranga
- Udaykumar as Vyasa Rayaru
- Rajashankar as Keshavacharya
- Balakrishna as Bagalakote Balakrishnacharya
- B Ramadevi as Bendakaluru Bhageerathi
- Narasimharaju as Hanumanthacharya
- Venkatesh
- Raghavendra Rao
- Vadiraj as Kullacharya
- Rathnakar as Appanna
- Ganapathi Bhat
- Master Sridhar
- Chittibabu
- Ramachandra Shastry
- Dwarakish as Dallali Deshakacharya
- Bangalore Nagesh as Gundacharya
- Rajendra Krishna
- Kuppuraj
- Srikanth
- Niranjan
- Lakshmaiah
- Dinesh
- Shivaram
- Dattharaj
- Iyengar
- Bapayya
- Swamy
- Harini as Sharade
- Mynavathi as Chithralekha
- L. Vijayalakshmi as Rukmini
- Papamma as Chithralekha's mother
- Saroja
- Janaki
- Shanthamma as wife of an Insolvent
- Kutty Padmini as Young Krishna

== Soundtrack ==
The music was composed by C. N. Pandurangan.

No.	Song	Singers	Lyrics	Length (m:ss)
1	"Aadidano Ranga"	M. L. Vasanthakumari	Purandara Dasa	03:06
2	"Aparadhi Nanallaa"	P. B. Sreenivas	Purandaradasa	03:14
3	"Chandrachooda"	M. Balamuralikrishna	Purandaradasa	03:02
4	"Jagadodharana"	M. Balamuralikrishna	Purandaradasa	03:16
5	"Kandu Kandu Nee Yenna"	M. Balamuralikrishna	Purandaradasa	03:26
6	"Sakalagrahabala"	P. B. Sreenivas	Purandaradasa	03:03
7	"Sri Gananatha"	M. Balamuralikrishna, Sarojini	Purandaradasa	05:56

== Reception ==
The Indian Express wrote, "If for nothing else, the music would make the Kannada film [Sri Purandara Dasaru] worth the while."
