= Sri Kanyaka Parameshwari Kathe =

- Directed by: Hunsur Krishnamurthy
- Screenplay by: Hunsur Krishnamurthy
- Produced by: Hunsur Krishnamurthy
- Starring: Rajkumar; B. M. Venkatesh; Nagendra Rao; H. R. Shastry
- Cinematography: D. V. Rajaram
- Edited by: P. N. Murthy
- Music by: Rajan–Nagendra
- Production company: Evergreen Productions
- Distributed by: Evergreen Productions
- Release date: 29 November 1966
- Country: India
- Language: Kannada

Sri Kanyaka Parameshwari Kathe is a 1966 Indian Kannada-language film, directed and produced by Hunsur Krishnamurthy. The film stars Rajkumar, B. M. Venkatesh, Nagendra Rao and H. R. Shastry. The film has musical score by Rajan–Nagendra. H. R. Bhargava was the associate director of this movie.

== Cast ==
- Rajkumar as Chitra Kanta and Raja Vishnuvardhana
- Pandari Bai Queen of Raja Vishnuvardhana
- B. M. Venkatesh as Lord Shiva
- Kalpana as Goddess Parvathi / Vasavi Kannika Parameswari (daughter of king kusuma sreshti and queen Vasavamba)
- R. Nagendra Rao as King Kusuma Sreshti
- M. Jayashree as Queen Vasavamba
- H. R. Shastry as Rajaguru of King Kusuma Sreshti
- Narasimharaju
- Subbanna
- Vasu
- Dinesh as God Agni Deva
- Shankar
- Dwarakish
- K. S. Ashwath
- H. K. Shastry
- Basappa
- Master Basavaraju
- Guptha
- Ranganath
- Raghu
- Ramadevi
- Sharada
- R. T. Rama
- Indira

== Soundtrack ==
The music was composed by Rajan–Nagendra.

No.	Song	Singers	Lyrics	Length (m:ss)
1	"Nintalli Avalu Kulitalli Avalu"	P. B. Sreenivas	Hunsur Krishnamurthy	03:01
