= Ananda Bashpa =

- Directed by: R. Nagendra Rao
- Produced by: R Nagendra Rao
- Starring: R. N. Sudarshan; K. S. Ashwath; Harini; Rajani
- Cinematography: R N Krishna Prasad
- Music by: G. K. Venkatesh
- Release date: 1963
- Country: India
- Language: Kannada

Ananda Bashpa is a 1963 Indian Kannada-language film, directed and produced by R. Nagendra Rao. The film stars R. N. Sudarshan, K. S. Ashwath, Harini and Rajani. The film had musical score by G. K. Venkatesh.

== Cast ==
- R. N. Sudarshan
- K. S. Ashwath
- Harini
- Rajani
- R. Nagendra Rao
