= Thumbida Koda =

1964 film directed by N. C. Rajan

- Directed by: N. C. Rajan
- Screenplay by: K. R. Seetharama Sastry
- Story by: Janakisutha
- Produced by: G. K. Venkatesh & Friends
- Starring: Rajkumar; Leelavathi; K. S. Ashwath; Narasimharaju; T. N. Balakrishna
- Cinematography: Annayya
- Edited by: N. C. Rajan; A. Thangaraj
- Music by: G. K. Venkatesh
- Production company: Sri Venkatesh Chithra
- Distributed by: Sri Venkatesh Chithra
- Release date: 1964
- Running time: 159 minutes
- Country: India
- Language: Kannada

Thumbida Koda is a 1964 Indian Kannada-language film directed by N. C. Rajan and produced by G. K. Venkatesh & Friends. The film stars Rajkumar, Leelavathi, K. S. Ashwath, Narasimharaju and Balakrishna.

The film has musical score by Venkatesh who also lent his voice for a song. The film features cameo appearances by singer P. Kalinga Rao and writer A. N. Krishna Rao.

== Cast ==
- Rajkumar as Ramachandra
- K. S. Ashwath as Sitapathi
- Narasimharaju as Nagesh
- T. N. Balakrishna as M. S. Ramdev, Ramachandra's father
- Comedian Guggu as Hampana Shetty
- Leelavathi as Radha
- Jayanthi as Uma, Sitapathi's daughter
- Jr Revathi
- Chindodi Leela as Komala
- M. Jayashree as Jaya, Ramachandra's mother
- Papamma as Meenakshi, Radha's mother
- Sharada
- Seethalakshmi
- Bangalore Nagesh
- Y. R. Ashwath Narayana
- Bhujanga Rao
- Gurusidda
- Chi. Udayashankar
- Chi. Narasimhan
- P. Kalinga Rao as himself (cameo; uncredited)
- A. N. Krishna Rao as himself (cameo; uncredited)

== Soundtrack ==
Thumbida Koda

Soundtrack album by G. K. Venkatesh
- Released: 1964
- Genre: Feature film soundtrack
- Length: 9:21
- Label: Saregama

Background music for the film was composed by G. K. Venkatesh, who also scored its soundtrack. The soundtrack album consists of three tracks.

Track listing
No.	Title	Lyrics	Singer(s)	Length
1.	"Madhumaga Banda"	K. R. Seetharama Sastry	S. Janaki	3:22
2.	"Anthintha Hennu"	K. S. Narasimhaswamy	P. Kalinga Rao	3:01
3.	"Balle Balle Na Balle"	K. R. Seetharama Sastry	S. Janaki	2:58
Total length:				9:21
