= S. Hanumantha Rao =

Saluri Hanumantha Rao
- Born: 1917
- Origin: Sivaramapuram, Vizianagaram district, India.
- Died: 27 May 1980 (aged 62–63)
- Genres: Vocalist, Music composer
- Occupation: Music composer
- Instrument: Harmonium
- Years active: 1944–1976

Saluri Hanumantha Rao (1917–1980) (Telugu: సాలూరు హనుమంతరావు) was a music composer of South Indian films. He was the son of Saluri Sanyasi Raju who was a mridangam player for the concerts of Dwaram Venkataswami Naidu and also a lyricist.

Rao was born in 1917 at Sivaramapuram, near Salur (Vijayanagaram district). He was the elder brother of S. Rajeswara Rao. He started his early life as a student of Dwaram Venkataswami Naidu. He was trained in Carnatic and Hindusthani classical music. He became the music composer for Golla Baama in 1944 and composed music for around 75 movies.

Rao married Raja Mani with whom he had three daughters and one son. Rao died on 27 May 1980.

== Films ==
Year	Film	Language	Director	Banner	Notes
1947	Gollabhama	Telugu	C. Pullayya	Sobhanachala Studios	with S. B. Dinakara Rao
1948	Madhalasa	Telugu	Chitrapu Narayana Rao	Sobhanachala Studios	
1948	Radhika	Telugu	K. Sadasiva Rao	Sri Chatrapathi Pictures	
1954	Rajee En Kanmani	Tamil	K. J. Mahadevan	Gemini Studios	
1954	Raji Na Pranam	Telugu	K. J. Mahadevan	Gemini Studios	
1957	Alladin Ka Chirag	Hindi	T. R. Raghunath	Jai Sakthi Pictures	with S. Rajeswara Rao
1957	Allauddin Adhbhuta Deepam	Telugu	T. R. Raghunath	Jai Sakthi Pictures	with S. Rajeswara Rao
1957	Allavudeenum Arputha Vilakkum	Tamil	T. R. Raghunath	Jai Sakthi Pictures	with S. Rajeswara Rao
1957	Bhale Ammayilu	Telugu	Vedantam Raghavayya	Narasu Studios	with S. Rajeswara Rao
1959	Veera Bhaskarudu	Telugu	K. B. Nagabhushanam	Varalakshmi Pictures	
1960	Dharmame Jayam	Telugu	K. B. Nagabhushanam	Varalakshmi Pictures	with G. Aswathama
1961	Usha Parinayam	Telugu	K. B. Nagabhushanam	Sri Rajarajeshwari Films	
1962	Dakshayagnam	Tamil	K. B. Nagabhushanam	Varalakshmi Pictures	
1962	Dakshayagnam	Telugu	K. B. Nagabhushanam	Varalakshmi Pictures	
1964	Prathigne	Kannada	B. S. Ranga	Vikram Productions	
1965	Chandrahasa	Kannada	B. S. Ranga	Vikram Productions	
1965	Chandrahasa	Telugu	B. S. Ranga	Vikram Productions	
1965	Mahasathi Anasuya	Kannada	B. S. Ranga	Vikram Productions	
1965	Sivarathri Mahatyam	Telugu	P. R. Kaundinya	Veeranjaneya Pictures	
1968	Bandhavyalu	Telugu	S. V. Ranga Rao	S. V. R. Films	
1968	Veyyi Rupayilu Notu	Telugu	K. S. Gopalakrishnan	Kalachithra	with K. V. Mahadevan
1970	Basthi Kiladilu	Telugu	G. V. R. Seshagiri Rao	Sri Chitra	
1971	Raithu Bidda	Telugu	B. A. Subba Rao	Lakshmi Kala Films	
1972	Muhammad bin Tughluq	Telugu	B. V. Prasad	Chalana Chitra	
1973	Panjaramlo Pasi Paapa	Telugu	Giduthuri Suryam	Ravi Chitra	
1974	Manushullo Devudu	Telugu	B. V. Prasad	Sri Bhaskara Chitra	with T. V. Raju
1975	Nija Roopalu	Telugu	K. V. Nandana Rao	Udayabhanu Productions	
1975	Aadadani Adrushtam	Telugu	G. V. R. Seshagiri Rao	Sri Vitthal Productions	
1975	Cinema Vaibhavam	Telugu	Padmanabham	Rekha & Murali Productions	
1975	Moguda? Pellama?	Telugu	B. A. Subba Rao	Nahata Film Enterprises	
1975	Sri Chamundeswari Mahima	Telugu	Addala Narayana Rao	Sri Venkatarama Films	
1976	Aasthi Kosam	Telugu	Giduthuri Suryam	Sri Rajalakshmi Chitra	
1976	Aradhana	Telugu	B. V. Prasad	Sri Bhaskara Chitra	
1976	Poornamma Katha	Telugu	K. V. Nandana Rao	Shivaji Arts	
1978	Parasurama Pratignya	Telugu	C. S. Rao		
1979	Swami Dhrohulu	Telugu	Giduthuri Suryam	Markandeya Films	
1980	Konda Raju Koya Pilla	Telugu		Padmalakshmi Productions	
1982	Paropakari Papanna	Telugu	D. S. Prakash Rao	Sri Tirumala Nagol Combines	
