= Vidhivilasa =

- Directed by: S. V. Mahesh
- Written by: H. L. Narayana Rao
- Produced by: N. N. Murugayyan
- Starring: Rajkumar; Leelavathi; K. S. Ashwath; Udaykumar; Harini; Narasimharaju; M. N. Lakshmi Devi
- Cinematography: S. K. Varadarajan, K. Govinda Swamy
- Edited by: P. S. Murthy, P. U. S. Mani, V. S. Mani
- Music by: T. Padman
- Release date: 1962
- Running time: 136 minutes
- Country: India
- Language: Kannada

Vidhivilasa is a 1962 Kannada language swashbuckler film directed by S. V. Mahesh and starring Rajkumar, Leelavathi and K. S. Ashwath. The film features a musical score composed by T. Padman. The story, screenplay, dialogues and lyrics were written by H. L. Narayana Rao, who was also the father of actor Vishnuvardhan.

== Plot ==
The film revolves around a King who challenges destiny, personified as a young woman, by attempting to alter the foretold events of his death. Despite his efforts to prevent the prophesied outcomes, a series of unforeseen events ultimately leads to the fulfillment of destiny's predictions.

== Cast ==
- Rajkumar as Madhava, the son of King's commander
- Leelavathi as Malathi
- K. S. Ashwath as King Malayakethu
- Udaykumar as another King who rescues the infant son of Malathi
- Harini as Mohini
- Narasimharaju as Ranjana
- M. N. Lakshmi Devi as Manjari
- B Jaya as Rohini
- Vasanthi as Sulochana

- Maala as Vidhi

== Soundtrack ==
The music was composed by T. Padman with lyrics by H. L. Narayana Rao.

Track listing
No.	Title	Lyrics	Singer(s)	Length
1.	"Aananda Saamrajyada Abhishechana"	H. L. Narayana Rao	P B Sreenivas, S. Janaki
2.	"Ariyade Ninnaya Gunagala"	H. L. Narayana Rao	P B Sreenivas, S. Janaki
3.	"Maathaa Hey Girijaatha"	H. L. Narayana Rao	S. Janaki
4.	"Sarasake Baa Sukumaara"	H. L. Narayana Rao	Jamuna Rani
5.	"Daari Kaanene Nova Thaalalaarene"	H. L. Narayana Rao	P B Sreenivas, S. Janaki
6.	"Bidu Gopi Janacharane"	H. L. Narayana Rao
7.	"Naane Neenu Neene Naanu"	H. L. Narayana Rao	Nagendra, Sarojini
