= Shiva Kotta Sowbhagya =

- Directed by: Hunsur Krishnamurthy
- Written by: Hunsur Krishnamurthy
- Screenplay by: Hunsur Krishnamurthy
- Produced by: V. Vargheese
- Starring: Lokesh; Aarathi; Jayanthi; Rajanand
- Cinematography: K. Mallik
- Edited by: R. Rajan; R. Rajashekar
- Music by: T. G. Lingappa
- Production company: Santhosh Combines
- Distributed by: Santhosh Combines
- Release date: 25 September 1985
- Country: India
- Language: Kannada

Shiva Kotta Sowbhagya is a 1985 Indian Kannada-language film, directed by Hunsur Krishnamurthy and produced by V. Vargheese. The film stars Lokesh, Aarathi, Jayanthi and Rajanand.

== Cast ==
- Lokesh
- Aarathi
- Jayanthi
- Rajanand
- B. K. Shankar
- Dingri Nagaraj
- Roopa Chakravarthy

== Soundtrack ==
The music was composed by T. G. Lingappa.

| No. | Song | Singers | Lyrics | Length (m:ss) |
|---|---|---|---|---|
| 1 | "Aduva Nalidaduva" | Sulochana | Hunsur Krishnamurthy | 04:03 |
| 2 | "Bale Todisalu" | Manjula | Hunsur Krishnamurthy | 02.:57 |
| 3 | "Darushanake Na Bande" | Rama | Hunsur Krishnamurthy | 04:24 |
| 4 | "Giniy Sobagina" | Jayachandran, Manjula | Hunsur Krishnamurthy | 04:18 |
| 5 | "O Gajaraja" | Jolly Abraham | Hunsur Krishnamurthy | 04:39 |
| 6 | "Yarakapayara Shapa" | Susheela | Hunsur Krishnamurthy | 03:28 |
