= Mahaashilpi =

- Directed by: S. V. Doraiswamy
- Produced by: H. B Aadirajaiah
- Starring: H. B. Jwalanaiah; K. S. Ashwath; Jayanthi
- Cinematography: S. V. SriKanth
- Music by: P. Kalinga Rao
- Release date: 11 April 1966
- Country: India
- Language: Kannada

Mahaashilpi is a 1966 Indian Kannada-language film, directed by S. V. Doraiswamy and produced by H. B Aadirajaiah. The film stars H. B. Jwalanaiah, K. S. Ashwath and Jayanthi in the lead roles. The film has musical score by P. Kalinga Rao.

== Cast ==
- H. B. Jwalanaiah
- K. S. Ashwath
- Jayanthi
