= Premamayi =

- Directed by: M. R. Vittal
- Written by: K.G.Sethunath
- Screenplay by: M. R. Vittal
- Produced by: Srikanth Nahatha; Srikanth Patel
- Starring: Rajkumar; K. S. Ashwath; Leelavathi; Jayanthi
- Cinematography: Srikanth; Rajaram
- Edited by: S. P. N. Krishna; T. P. Velayudham
- Music by: R. Sudarshanam
- Production companies: Srikanth & Srikanth Enterprises
- Distributed by: Srikanth & Srikanth Enterprises
- Release date: 2 June 1966
- Running time: 110 min
- Country: India
- Language: Kannada

Premamayi is a 1966 Indian Kannada-language film, directed by M. R. Vittal and produced by Srikanth Nahatha and Srikanth Patel. The film stars Rajkumar, K. S. Ashwath, Leelavathi and Jayanthi. The film has musical score by R. Sudarshanam. This is the only movie where Leelavathi played the role of Rajkumar's sister-in-law. The movie is an official adaptation of the National Award winning 1964 Malayalam movie Kudumbini.

This was singer K. J. Yesudas's second movie which had Rajkumar in the lead role - the first one being Ondaguva Mundaguva from Chandavalliya Thota (1964) which however was not picturized on Rajkumar. Thus, this became the only movie where Rajkumar lip synced to Yesudas' voice who sang two songs in the movie - Too Too Too Bedappa and Henne Ninna Kannanota. The movie is also noticeable for not having any songs by P.B. Sreenivas, who was the almost exclusive on-screen "voice" of Rajkumar during this era.

== Cast ==
- Rajkumar as Madhava
- Jayanthi as Janu
- K. S. Ashwath as Raghavayya
- Leelavathi as Lakshmi
- B. Jayamma
- B. Jaya as Sharada
- B. V. Radha
- B. Ramadevi as Maadhu, Raghu, and Sharada's mother
- Prashanth (credited as Baby Prashanth)
- Arun Kumar
- Ranga as Shetru
- Dikki Madhava Rao as Rudramuni
- Makeup Subbanna
- B. Raghavendra Rao as Sampangi
- Kuppuraj
- Basavaraj (credited as Master Basavaraj)

== Soundtrack ==
The music was composed by R. Sudarsanam.

No.	Song	Singers	Lyrics	Length (m:ss)
1	"Henne Ninna Kannanota"	K. J. Yesudas, S. Janaki	Vijaya Narasimha	03:20
2	"Krishna Aa Krishneyu"	S. Janaki	Vijaya Narasimha	03:55
3	"Maneya Jyothiyu"	T. M. Soundararajan	Vijaya Narasimha	04:01
4	"Thengella Thoogadi"	T. M. Soundararajan, S. Janaki	Narendra Babu	05:40
5	"Thoo Thoo Thoo Bedappa"	K. J. Yesudas	Vijaya Narasimha	03:25
