= Dhana Pishachi =

- Directed by: S. N. Singh
- Written by: Mohini Productions
- Story by: H. J. Mahanthesh Shastry
- Produced by: S. N. Singh
- Starring: Sampath; K. S. Ashwath; Dikki Madhavarao; Kalpana
- Cinematography: K. S. Govindaswamy
- Edited by: P. S. Murthy
- Music by: Satyam
- Production company: Mohini Productions
- Distributed by: Mohini Productions
- Release date: 1967
- Running time: 124 minutes
- Country: India
- Language: Kannada

Dhana Pishachi (transl. Wealth demon) is a 1967 Indian Kannada-language film directed and produced by S. N. Singh. The film stars Sampath, K. S. Ashwath, Dikki Madhavarao and Kalpana. The film has musical score by Satyam.

== Synopsis ==
The film explores how the toxic obsession with sudden or unearned riches tests human relationships and ultimately breeds misfortune if not balanced with humility and virtue.

== Cast ==
- Kalpana as Asha
- Sampath as Rama Rao
- K. S. Ashwath
- B. Vijayalakshmi
- B. M. Venkatesh
- Dwarakish as Dwarakish
- Ranga
- Ramaraj Urs
- Bhaskar
- Subramanya Shastry
- Ramarao
- Rajanand
- Anantharam Maccheri
- M. R. Srinivas
- Sampige Shankar
- Venkataramaiah
