= Subba Shastry =

- Directed by: M. V. Krishnaswamy
- Written by: A. N. Murthy Rao (dialogues)
- Screenplay by: A. N. Murthy Rao; M. V. Krishnaswamy
- Story by: A. N. Murthy Rao
- Based on: Drama Aashadabhoothi
- Produced by: M. V. Krishnaswamy
- Starring: Kalyan Kumar; K. S. Ashwath; Arunkumar; Shivaraj; Chandrakala; Harini
- Cinematography: H. M. K. Murthy
- Edited by: S. Jayaram; A. Rameshan
- Music by: Doreswamy Iyengar; S. Krishnamurthy
- Production company: Sriranga Productions
- Distributed by: Sriranga Productions
- Release date: 1966
- Running time: 133 minutes
- Country: India
- Language: Kannada

Subba Shastry is a 1966 Indian Kannada-language film, directed and produced by M. V. Krishnaswamy. The film is based on the play Aashadhabhoothi by A. N. Murthy Rao. It stars Kalyan Kumar, K. S. Ashwath, Arunkumar, Chandrakala, Harini, Mynavathi and G V Shivanand. The film has musical score by Doreswamy Iyengar and S. Krishnamurthy.

== Cast ==
- Kalyan Kumar
- K. S. Ashwath
- Arunkumar
- Shivaraj
- G. V. Shivanand
- M. S. Subbanna
- L. N. Swamy
- Harini
- Chandrakala
- Lakshmamma
- Mynavathi in a cameo
- K. B. Gopinath
- M. R. Subramanyam
- K. N. Shanthadevi
- Sharada
- Indira
- Bhargavi Narayan

== Soundtrack ==
The music was composed by Doreswamy Iyengar and S. Krishnamurthy.

No.	Song	Singers	Lyrics	Length (m:ss)
1	"Kalabeda Kolabeda"	M. Balamuralikrishna	Basavanna	1:27
2	"Karaarvindhena"	M. Balamuralikrishna	Purandaradasa	1:57
3	"Lokanmudayan"	M. Balamuralikrishna	Kanakadasa	4:29
4	"Sree Mathapay Onindhi" Purandaradasa	M. Balamuralikrishna	4:20	
5	"Krishnana Kolalina Kare"	Srirangam Gopalaratnam	P. T. Narasimhachar	4:00
