= Amarajeevi (1965 film) =

- Poster
- Directed by: G. Krishna Murthy
- Produced by: D. Narayanappa
- Starring: Raja Shankar; Harini; T. N. Balakrishna; Narasimharaju
- Cinematography: S. K. Varada Rajan
- Music by: Vijaya Bhaskar
- Release date: 1965
- Country: India
- Language: Kannada

Amarajeevi is a 1965 Indian Kannada film, directed by G. Krishna Murthy and produced by D. Narayanappa. The film stars Raja Shankar, Harini, T. N. Balakrishna and Narasimharaju in the lead roles. The film has musical score by Vijaya Bhaskar.

== Cast ==
- Raja Shankar
- Harini
- T. N. Balakrishna
- Narasimharaju
- B. Ramadevi

== Soundtrack ==
The music was composed by Vijaya Bhaskar.

No.	Song	Singers	Lyrics	Length (m:ss)
1	"Halliyoora Hammera"	P. B. Sreenivas	Kanagal Prabhakara Shastry	02:54
