= Shivagange Mahathme =

- Directed by: Govindaiah
- Written by: Sorat Ashwath
- Produced by: J. C. Thimmarayappa
- Starring: Rajkumar; Udaykumar; K. S. Ashwath; Balakrishna; Harini; Rajasree
- Cinematography: M. S. Mani
- Edited by: P. S. Murthy
- Music by: G. K. Raghu
- Production company: Balakrishna Movies
- Distributed by: Balakrishna Movies
- Release date: 4 August 1964
- Country: India
- Language: Kannada

Shivagange Mahathme is a 1964 Indian Kannada-language film, directed by Govindaiah and produced by J. C. Thimmarayappa. The film stars Rajkumar, Udaykumar, K. S. Ashwath and Balakrishna. The film has musical score by G. K. Raghu.

== Cast ==
- Rajkumar as Sukumara
- Udaykumar
- K. S. Ashwath
- Balakrishna
- Rathnakar
- T. Subba Rao
- Shyamsundar
- Sathyanarayana
- Kuppuraj
- Hanumantha Rao
- M. Basappa
- Harini
- M. Jayashree
- Rajasree
- H. P. Saroja
- B. Jaya as Meenakshi
- Sujatha

== Soundtrack ==
The music was composed by Raghu.

No.	Song	Singers	Lyrics	Length (m:ss)
1	"Shiva Gangavara"	P. B. Sreenivas	Sorat Ashwath	07:07
