= Mangala Muhurta =

- Directed by: M. R. Vittal
- Produced by: U. Subba Rao
- Starring: R. N. Sudarshan; Harini; Raja Shankar; K. S. Ashwath
- Cinematography: S. V. Srikanth
- Music by: Rajan–Nagendra
- Release date: 1964
- Country: India
- Language: Kannada

Mangala Muhurta is a 1964 Indian Kannada film, directed by M. R. Vittal and produced by U. Subba Rao. The film stars R. N. Sudarshan, Harini, Raja Shankar and K. S. Ashwath in the lead roles. The film has musical score by Rajan–Nagendra.

== Cast ==
- R. N. Sudarshan
- Harini
- Raja Shankar
- K. S. Ashwath
