= Sarvagna Murthy =

- Directed by: Aruru Pattabhi
- Written by: M. Narendra Babu (dialogues)
- Screenplay by: M. Narendra Babu
- Produced by: M. Narendra Babu
- Starring: Rajkumar; Harini; Udaykumar; Mynavathi
- Cinematography: K. Janakiram
- Edited by: Balu Rao
- Music by: G. K. Venkatesh
- Release date: 8 March 1965
- Country: India
- Language: Kannada

Sarvagna Murthy is a 1965 Indian Kannada-language film, directed by Aruru Pattabhi and produced by M. Narendra Babu. The film stars Rajkumar, Harini, Udaykumar and Mynavathi. The film has musical score by G. K. Venkatesh. The movie chronicles the life of Kannada poet – philosopher Sarvajna. Rajkumar's real life brother Varadaraj appeared as his brother in this movie. Renuka Sharma was the assistant director of this movie.

== Cast ==
- Rajkumar
- Harini
- Udaykumar
- Mynavathi
- K. S. Ashwath
- Rajamma Gokak
- Niranjan
- T. N. Balakrishna
- Jayalakshmi
- Varadaraj
- Dikki Madhava Rao
- Mysore Lakshmi
- H. Krishna Shastry
- M. A. Ganapathi Bhat
- B. Hanumanthachar
- H. R. Hanumantha Rao
- Ambujamma
- H. P. Saroja
- Padmamma
- Soorya Kumar
- E. V. Saroja

== Soundtrack ==
G K Venkatesh composed the music for the soundtrack and the background score for the film. The lyrics for the soundtrack was penned by M Narendra Babu, which also includes a Kannada Folk song, Belagagi Naaneddu. The soundtrack album consists of six tracks.

Song	Singer	Lyrics
Sarvajna Matthomme Hutti Baa	P Nageshwar Rao	M Narendra Babu
Belagagi Naaneddu Yaryaara Neneyali	C S Sarojini	M Narendra Babu
Neenellaranthe Allavanthe	C S Sarojini	M Narendra Babu
Balukuvi Chelvalatheyalli	S Janaki	M Narendra Babu
Nodilli Node Vayyari	S Janaki	M Narendra Babu
Obbanallade Jagake Ibbarunte Matthe	Aaradhya, Basavaraju	M Narendra Babu
