= Pathivratha =

- Directed by: P. S. Murthy
- Produced by: M. N. Srinivas
- Starring: Rajkumar; Udaykumar; Harini
- Cinematography: T. Ellappan
- Music by: T. A. Moti
- Release date: 1965
- Country: India
- Language: Kannada

Pathivratha (transl. husband fidelity) is a 1965 Indian Kannada-language film directed by P. S. Murthy and produced by M. N. Srinivas. The film stars Rajkumar, Udaykumar and Harini. The musical score was composed by T. A. Moti. The film took 6 years (from 1959 to 1965) to complete, making it the longest time period for a movie starring Rajkumar to be in production.

== Cast ==
- Rajkumar
- Udaykumar
- Harini
