= Shivarathri Mahathme =

- Directed by: P. R. Kaundinya
- Screenplay by: P. R. Kaundinya; Chi. Sadashivaiah
- Story by: P. R. Kaundinya; Chi. Sadashivaiah
- Produced by: P. R. Kaundinya; S. S. Raju
- Starring: Rajkumar; Leelavathi; K. S. Ashwath; M. Jayashree; Narasimharaju; Rajasree
- Cinematography: Mathur
- Edited by: K. A. Marthaand
- Music by: Shivaprasad
- Production company: Venus Studio
- Distributed by: Ambika Films
- Release date: 1964
- Country: India
- Language: Kannada

Shivarathri Mahathme is a 1964 Indian Kannada-language film directed by P. R. Kaundinya. The film stars Rajkumar, Leelavathi and K. S. Ashwath. The movie was dubbed in Telugu in 1965 as Shivarathri Mahatyam.

== Cast ==
- Rajkumar as Vijaya, King of Simhapuri
- Leelavathi as Vasanthi
- K. S. Ashwath as Veera Simha, Vijaya's father
- M. Jayashree as Vijaya's mother
- Narasimharaju as Panchu
- Rajasree as Ranjana
- Sobhan Babu as Narada
- Seetharama Shastri
- Prabhakara Reddy

== Reception ==
The film was reported to be "one of the most important films in Kannada on Lord Shiva".
