= Deva Maanava =

- Directed by: C. P. Jambulingam
- Produced by: Raavana
- Starring: Udaykumar; Jayanthi; B. Vijayalakshmi; B. V. Radha
- Music by: S. M. Subbaiah Naidu
- Release date: 1966
- Country: India
- Language: Kannada

Deva Maanava is a 1966 Indian Kannada film directed by C. P. Jambulingam and produced by Raavana. The film stars Udaykumar, Jayanthi, B Vijayalakshmi and B. V. Radha. The musical score was composed by S. M. Subbaiah Naidu.

== Cast ==
- Udaykumar
- Jayanthi
- B Vijayalakshmi
- B. V. Radha
