= K. S. Ashwath =

Indian actor (1925-2010)

- Ashwath in Naagarahaavu (1972)
- Born: Karaganahalli Subbaraya Ashwathanarayana; 25 March 1925; Karaganahalli, Holenarasipura, Hassan, Kingdom of Mysore (Now Karnataka), British India
- Died: 18 January 2010 (aged 84); Mysore, Karnataka, India
- Other name: Chammayya Meshtru
- Spouse: Sharadamma
- Children: 4, (Shankar Ashwath)

Karaganahalli Subbaraya Ashwathanarayana (25 March 1925 – 18 January 2010) was a veteran Indian actor who worked in Kannada films. He appeared in over 370 films during his five-decade-long career. His memorial is in the Kengeri satellite town, Bengaluru. Memorial name - "K. S. Ashwath Memorial Children's Park".

== Early life ==
Ashwath was born on 25 March 1925 in Mysore city in the Kingdom of Mysore of British India as Karaganahalli Subbaraya Ashwathanarayana. He completed his primary education from Dalvoy School, Mysore. He then attained the Bachelor of Commerce degree from Maharaja's College, Mysore with seventh rank in the university. His formal education came to an end in 1942 as he joined the Indian freedom struggle. Two years later, he got a job as a Food Inspector. He later became a stenographer in the Deputy Commissioner's office and spent ten years in government service.

== Career ==
Ashwath's acting career began when he started participating in radio plays produced by Mysore All India Radio. His theatre career thus took off and played major roles in plays of A. N. Murthy Rao, Parvathavani and others. Film director K. Subramanyam, who saw him in one of these plays, selected him for a role in Streerathna in 1956, which was Ashwath's debut as a film actor. He was associated with a theatre group shripita .

In 1960, he played the role of a Swami in Kittur Chennamma with B. Saroja Devi in the lead role. In the same year, he played Narada in the hit Bhakta Prahlada. His role in Gali Gopura gave him an edge and helped shape his career as an artiste of immense calibre. Ashwath then got a role in the English film Seven Wonders of the World and even became the first Kannada actor to appear in a colour film.

Several of his films became big hits. His character role in Naagarahaavu as Chamayya meshtru (i.e., Chamayya Teacher) is still remembered and emulated. Another performance in the film Gange Gauri as Narada (the mythological son of Lord Vishnu) is remarkable in the style, rendering in his inimitable style. He accepted the roles of a father to many co-artistes of around his age as long as the character he was playing was strong. In all, he appeared in 370 films, of which 98 came in supportive roles in films with Rajkumar as the lead actor.

== Death ==
Ashwath had been suffering from Vertebrobasilar insufficiency. On 11 January 2010, he was admitted to the B. M. Hospital, Mysore, following his return from Varanasi where he had developed urinary tract infection. His health deteriorated and he subsequently died at 2:15 a.m. on 18 January following a cardiac arrest. He was cremated at the foothills of Chamundi hills in Mysore.

== Awards ==
- 1993–94: Dr. Rajkumar Lifetime Achievement Award by the Karnataka Government.
- Honorary Doctorate: Ashwath was conferred an honorary doctorate from the Tumkur University in the year 2008 for his great contribution to the Kannada cinema for five long decades. He was supposedly the first actor to receive a doctorate from the Tumkur University. While receiving the award, Ashwath said he would dedicate this award to all his directors who brought out the actor in him.
- He is the recipient of 3 national awards.

== Filmography ==
Year	Title	Role	Notes
1955	Shivasharane Nambekka		
1955	Sthree Rathna		
1956	Kacha Devayani		
1956	Kokilavani		
1957	Chinthamani		
1957	Prabhulinga Leele		
1958	Bhookailasa (film)	Shiva	
1958	Anna Thangi	Somanna Gowda	
1959	Manege Banda Mahalakshmi		
1959	Jagajyothi Basveshwara		
1959	Mahishasura Mardini	Narada	
1960	Shivalinga Sakshi		
1960	Ranadheera Kanteerava	Nirisha	
1960	Dashavathara (film)		
1960	Bhakta Kanakadasa		
1961	Kittur Chennamma (film)		
1961	Kaiwara Mahathme		
1961	Nagarjuna (film)		
1962	Rathna Manjari		
1962	Gaali Gopura	Ranganna	
1962	Bhoodana		
1962	Swarna Gowri	Narada	
1962	Karuneye Kutumbada Kannu	K. Venkanna	
1962	Thayi Karalu		
1962	Vidhivilasa	King Malayakethu	
1962	Thejaswini		
1963	Nanda Deepa		
1963	Gowri		
1963	Jeevana Tharanga		
1963	Malli Maduve		
1963	Kulavadhu		
1963	Kalitharu Henne		
1963	Veera Kesari		
1963	Mana Mecchida Madadi	Umakanth	
1963	Ananda Bashpa		
1963	Bangari		
1963	Jenu Goodu	Raghanna	
1963	Santha Thukaram		
1963	Sri Ramanjaneya Yuddha		
1963	Sathi Shakthi		
1964	Mangala Muhurta		
1964	Shivarathri Mahathme	Veera Simha	
1964	Navajeevana		
1964	Annapoorna (film)	Shivashankar	
1964	Thumbida Koda	Sitapathi	
1964	Shivagange Mahathme		
1964	Muriyada Mane	Ramegowda	
1964	Prathigne	Mahadevayya	
1964	Chinnada Gombe		
1964	Pathiye Daiva		
1964	Mane Aliya	Shivappa	
1965	Beratha Jeeva		
1965	Chandrahasa	Munishwara	
1965	Sarvagna Murthy		
1965	Satya Harishchandra	Vashistha	
1965	Mahasathi Anasuya	Athri Muni	
1965	Mavana Magalu		
1965	Bettada Huli		
1965	Sathi Savithri		
1965	Miss Leelavathi	Govindachar	
1965	Maduve Madi Nodu	Parameshwaraiah	
1966	Mamatheya Bandhana		
1966	Mahaashilpi		
1966	Premamayi	Raghavayya	
1966	Deva Maanava		
1966	Subba Shastry		
1966	Madhu Malathi	Keshava Chandragupta	
1966	Sri Kanyaka Parameshwari Kathe		
1966	Sandhya Raga	Srinivasa Rao	
1967	Onde Balliya Hoogalu	Veerabhadra	
1967	Anuradha	Sadanand Rao	
1967	Sathi Sukanya		
1967	Gange Gowri	Narada	
1967	Kallu Sakkare		
1967	Belli Moda	Sadashivaiah	
1967	Muddu Meena		
1967	Manassiddare Marga	Police Commissioner Narayan Rao	
1967	Sri Purandara Dasaru	Srinivasa Nayaka/Sri Purandara Daasaru	
1967	Dhana Pishachi		
1967	Immadi Pulikeshi (film)	Harshavardhana	
1968	Jedara Bale	Rao Bahadur Narasimha Rao	
1968	Gandhinagara		
1968	Sarvamangala		
1968	Bhagya Devathe	Madhu Shetty	
1968	Bangalore Mail		
1968	Mamathe		
1968	Bhagyada Bagilu	Shyam Rao	
1968	Namma Ooru		
1968	Dhoomakethu		
1968	Amma	Vasu	
1969	Madhura Milana		
1969	Namma Makkalu		
1969	Kaadina Rahasya	Dr. Ranganath	
1969	Eradu Mukha		
1969	Choori Chikkanna	Krishnaraja	
1969	Bhageerathi		
1969	Kalpavruksha		
1969	Bhale Raja		
1969	Uyyale	Seshu Rao	
1969	Ade Hrudaya Ade Mamathe		
1969	Gruhalakshmi	Srikantayya	
1969	Ellellu Naane		
1969	Manashanthi		
1969	Mukunda Chandra		
1970	Gejje Pooje	Ananthaiah	
1970	Arishina Kumkuma	Nanjundaiah	
1970	Anireekshitha		
1970	Aparajithe		
1970	Mruthyu Panjaradalli Goodachari 555		
1970	Mooru Mutthugalu		
1970	Namma Mane		
1970	C.I.D. Rajanna		
1970	Aaru Mooru Ombhatthu	Lawyer Rangachari	
1970	Seetha		
1971	Kasturi Nivasa	Ramaiah	
1971	Sidila Mari		
1971	Onde Kula Onde Daiva		
1971	Sharapanjara	Narayanappa	
1971	Paapa Punya		
1971	Naguva Hoovu		
1971	Anugraha (film)		
1971	Namma Baduku		
1971	Thayi Devaru	Raja Rao	
1971	Kalyani		
1971	Bhale Adrushtavo Adrushta	Rao Bahadur Sundareshwar	
1971	Thande Makkalu		
1971	Mukthi		
1971	Nyayave Devaru	Chandrashekharaiah	
1971	Sri Krishna Rukmini Satyabhama	Satrajit	
1972	Naagarahaavu	Chamayya Meshtru	
1972	Janma Rahasya	Ramanath	
1972	Sipayi Ramu	Hari Singh	
1972	Vishakanye		
1972	Utthara Dakshina		
1972	Yaava Janmada Maitri	Shankar	
1972	Bhale Rani		
1972	Hrudaya Sangama		
1972	Naa Mechida Huduga	Bhaskar Rao	
1972	Nanda Gokula	Seetharamayya	
1972	Bandhavya		
1972	Jaga Mecchida Maga	King	
1972	Mareyada Deepavali		
1973	Sahadharmini		
1973	Bidugade	Bhyrappa	
1973	Doorada Betta		
1973	Kaanada Kai		
1973	Mooruvare Vajragalu	Dharmaja	
1974	Chamundeshwari Mahime		
1974	Bangaarada Panjara	Junjappa	
1974	Hemareddy Mallamma		
1974	Eradu Kanasu	Ramu's father	
1974	Upasane	Subba Rao	
1974	Maha Thyaga		
1974	Maga Mommaga		
1974	Anna Attige	Siddappa	
1975	Devara Gudi	Bhaskar and Suchitra's father	
1975	Daari Tappida Maga	D C Raju	
1975	Shubhamangala		
1975	Kasthuri Vijaya		
1975	Mane Belaku		
1975	Kaveri		
1975	Bhagya Jyothi		
1975	Mayura	Shadananasharma	
1975	Hennu Samsarada Kannu		
1975	Aasha Soudha		
1976	Devaru Kotta Vara	Ranganna	
1976	Makkala Bhagya	Bhama's father	
1976	Baduku Bangaravayithu		
1976	Besuge	Venu's father	
1976	Mugiyada Kathe		
1976	Raja Nanna Raja		
1976	Badavara Bandhu	Badrinatha	
1976	Bayalu Daari	Madhava Rao	
1976	Bangarada Gudi	Ramanappa	
1976	Mangalya Bhagya		
1976	Kanasu Nanasu		
1977	Sri Renukadevi Mahathme		
1977	Sose Tanda Soubhagya	Ramappa	
1977	Shrimanthana Magalu	Dayananda Rao	
1977	Shani Prabhava		
1977	Banashankari (film)	Ranganatha's Father	
1977	Veera Sindhoora Lakshmana		
1977	Galate Samsara	Gubbi Ganesh Rao	
1978	Havina Hejje		
1978	Vamsha Jyothi	Sharada's father	
1978	Maathu Tappada Maga	Jagapathi Rao	
1978	Mythri		
1978	Muyyige Muyyi	Nataraj	
1978	Siritanakke Savaal	Maadha	
1978	Nanna Prayaschittha	Suma's father	Guest Appearance
1978	Kiladi Jodi	Sadaananda	
1978	Vasantha Lakshmi	Narayanappa	
1978	Amarnath		
1978	Sridevi		
1978	Madhura Sangama	Srikanthaiah	
1979	Priya	Janardhan	
1979	Naa Ninna Bidalaare	Krishna's father	
1979	Pakka Kalla	Rajaram	
1979	Muyyi		
1979	Putani Agent 123		
1979	Vijay Vikram		
1979	Chandanada Gombe	Lakshman Rao	
1979	Nentaro Gantu Kallaro		
1979	Honni Maduve		
1980	Bhaktha Siriyala		
1980	Nanna Rosha Nooru Varusha	Raamu Varma Heggade	
1980	Dhairya Lakshmi		
1980	Auto Raja	Bhavani's father	
1980	Haddina Kannu	Dharmappa	
1980	Kappu Kola		
1980	Ondu Hennu Aaru Kannu	Ajay and Vijay's father	
1980	Narada Vijaya	Scientist Lakshmipathy	
1980	Nammammana Sose		
1980	Vasantha Geetha	Seshadri	
1980	Janma Janmada Anubandha	Panduranga	
1980	Nyaya Neethi Dharma	Kumar's father	
1980	Driver Hanumanthu		
1981	Leader Vishwanath		
1981	Chaya		
1981	Etu Eduretu		
1981	Gaali Maathu		
1981	Geetha	Srinivas	
1981	Nee Nanna Gellalare	Eshwaraiah	
1981	Bhoomige Banda Bhagavantha	Ganga's father	Guest Appearance
1981	Snehitara Savaal	Vishwanatha Rao	
1981	Bhagyavantha	Krishna's uncle	
1981	Prema Pallavi		
1981	Bhagyada Belaku		
1981	Edeyooru Siddalingeshwara		
1981	Lakshmi Prasanna		
1982	Baadada Hoo	Murthy	
1982	Hosa Belaku	Gopalraya	
1982	Guna Nodi Hennu Kodu		
1982	Parajitha		
1982	Jimmy Gallu		
1982	Nanna Devaru	Dr. Ranganath	
1982	Chalisuva Modagalu	Vishwanath Rao	
1982	Hasyaratna Ramakrishna		
1983	Benkiya Bale		
1983	Kaamana Billu	Seshappa	
1983	Ibbani Karagithu		
1983	Mududida Tavare Aralithu	Govinda Rao	
1983	Gayathri Maduve	Gayathri's father	
1983	Makkale Devaru	Gangadhar Rao	
1983	Samarpane		
1984	Eradu Rekhegalu		
1984	Shravana Banthu	Shankaraiah	
1984	Premave Baalina Belaku		
1984	Ramapurada Ravana	Basavarajaiah	Special Appearance
1984	Runa Mukthalu		
1984	Ajnathavasa		
1984	Male Banthu Male		
1984	Bilee Gulabi		
1984	Aaradhane		
1985	Bidugadeya Bedi	Sanjeeva Rao	
1985	Guru Jagadguru		
1985	Shwetha Gulabi		
1985	Lakshmi Kataksha		
1985	Giri Baale		
1985	Jwaalamukhi	Rudraiah	
1985	Dhruva Thare	Advocate Johny Briganza	
1986	Bhagyada Lakshmi Baramma	Parvati's grandfather	
1986	Karna	Karna's father	
1986	Beegara Pandya		
1986	Hennina Koogu		
1986	Anuraga Aralithu	Mohan Rao	
1986	Devathe		
1986	Sundara Swapnagalu		
1986	Aruna Raaga	Raghavayya	
1987	Bazar Bheema		
1987	Karunamayi	Shastri, Raja's father	
1987	Agni Kanye		
1987	Shubha Milana		
1987	Shruthi Seridaaga	N R Narayan Rao (Nani)	
1987	Sathyam Shivam Sundaram		Guest Appearance
1988	Brahma Vishnu Maheshwara	Hayavadan Rao	
1988	Shanthi Nivasa		
1988	Nava Bharatha		
1988	Bharath		
1988	Samyuktha	Veerabhadraiah	
1988	Jana Nayaka		
1988	Devatha Manushya	Vaikuntha	
1988	Mahadasohi Sharana Basava		
1988	Mutthaide		
1988	Daada	Senior Daada	
1989	Hongkongnalli Agent Amar		
1989	Rudra	Inspector Sadashiva	
1989	Inspector Vikram	Police Commissioner Chandrashekar	
1989	Sharavegada Saradara		
1989	Anthintha Gandu Nanalla		
1989	Singari Bangari		
1989	Gagana	Ananth (Guest Appearance)	
1989	Abhimana		
1989	Gajapathi Garvabhanga	Ranganna Meshtru	
1989	Yaaru Hone		
1990	Aasegobba Meesegobba	Police Inspector	Guest Appearance
1990	Mruthyunjaya	Lawyer Ramakrishnaiah	
1990	Udbhava		
1990	Muthina Haara	Belliappa	
1990	Halliya Surasuraru		
1990	Nigooda Rahasya		
1991	Hrudaya Haadithu	Mahadevayya	
1991	Aralida Hoovugalu	College principal	
1991	Garuda Dhwaja		
1991	Modada Mareyalli	M. R. Panduranga Rao	
1991	Jagadeka Veera		
1991	Mathru Bhagya		
1992	Kranthi Gandhi		
1992	Rajadhi Raja		
1992	Saptapadi	Sahana's father	
1992	Kanasina Rani	Ramu	
1992	Jeevana Chaitra	Rama Rao	
1992	Megha Mandara	Belliappa	
1992	Belliyappa Bangarappa	Police Commissioner	
1992	Halli Krishna Delhi Radha	Moorthy	
1992	Mana Mecchida Sose	Sitapathi	
1992	Mannina Doni	Chandrashekhaiah	
1993	Jaga Mechida Huduga	Shrikanta Shastri	
1993	Mangalya Bandhana	Geetha's father	
1993	Anuragada Alegalu		
1993	Vasantha Poornima		
1993	Chirabandhavya		
1993	Mane Devru	Ranganath	
1993	Urvashi Kalyana		
1993	Jeevana Sangharsha		
1993	Munjaneya Manju		
1993	Shrungara Raja		
1993	Kalyana Rekhe		
1993	Gejje Naada		
1993	Kumkuma Bhagya		
1993	Ananda Jyothi		
1993	Bhagavan Sri Saibaba	Bharadvaja	
1993	Hoovondu Beku Ballige		
1993	Navibbaru Namagibbaru		
1993	Rupayi Raja		
1994	Odahuttidavaru	Venkanna	
1994	Gandhada Gudi Part 2		
1994	Sammilana		
1994	Musuku		
1994	Makkala Sakshi		
1994	Kaveri Theeradalli		
1997	Prema Geethe		
1999	Dalavayi		
2000	Shabdavedhi	G. K. Kamalakar and G. K. Prasad	Dual Role
2000	Preethsu Thappenilla		
2000	Nan Hendthi Chennagidale	Seetha's father	
2000	Naxalite		
2001	Anjali Geethanjali		
2001	Shaapa	Cook	
2002	Law and Order (2002 film)		
2002	Mutthu		
2002	Entha Lokavayya		
2002	Nata		
2003	Kiccha		
2003	Preetisle Beku	Aish's father	
2005	Karnana Sampatthu		
2006	Sirivantha	Shankarananda Swamiji	Cameo appearance
2006	Saavira Mettilu		
2007	Bhoopathi	Bhupathi's grandfather	
