= Harini (Kannada actress) =

Heroine of Kannada Cinema in 1950s to 1960s

- Born: 1935 or 1936 (age 90–91)
- Other name: Harini S. Rao
- Occupations: Actress, Producer
- Years active: 1944–1972 (Retired)

Harini is a former actress in Kannada cinema. She was active during the 1950s and 1960s, retiring at the peak of her career. As of 2006 she lived in Bangalore.

== Early life ==
Harini was born to tulu speaking Shivalli Madhva Brahmins Paniyadi Srinivasa Upadhya and Bharathi in Udupi as their fourth child. Her brother Vadiraj was also an actor and producer. She appeared as a child artist in films like Sri Murugan and Kannika for which she received one rupee for delivering the dialogues very nicely. She became a full-fledged heroine through Tamil film Punyavathi.

== Career ==
Harini made her debut as leading lady in Jaganmohini in the role of Mohini at the age of 15. She was the first heroine to wear a swimsuit on the Kannada film screen. The film became a silver jubilee hit and made Harini an overnight star. Harini got 200 letters for her stellar performance when she was shooting for her second film, bilingual Ratnadeep made simultaneously in Tamil and Hindi.

From thereon Harini played a variety of roles in Dallali, Vichitra Prapancha, Nandi, Nanda Deepa, Kanya Dana, Gandharva Kanya and Pathivratha, among other films. Harini acted with many stars of her time, including Dr. Rajkumar, with whom she acted in more than 10 films, Kalyan Kumar, and Udaykumar. Harini has received best actress awards for Nanda Deepa and Mangala Muhurtha.

Sathi Sukanya, released in 1968, was her last film. Harini got married in 1972, moved to Saudi Arabia, and stayed there for 12 years.

Apart from acting, Harini has tried her hand in film production too. Along with her brothers Vadiraj-Jawahar she has produced some meaningful films under the banners of Sri Bharathi Chitra and Vijaya Bharathi. Some of the films produced by Harini are Naandi, Nanda Deepa, Nava Jeevana, Namma Makkalu, and Seetha.

== Awards ==
- 2015 - Dr. Rajkumar Award by the Karnataka Government.
- 2010 - Padmabhushan Dr. B. Saroja Devi National Award by Bharathiya Vidya Bhavan.
- 1969 - Filmfare Award for Best Film – Kannada for Namma Makkalu

== Filmography ==
Year	Title	Role	Notes	Ref.
1944	Haridas	Krishnan	Tamil film	
1946	Sri Murugan	Young Murugan	Tamil film	
1947	Kannika	Young Kannika	Tamil film	
1949	Pavalakodi		Tamil film	
1951	Jaganmohini			
1952	Ratnadeep		Hindi film	
1953	Dallali			
1953	Mangala Gowri			
1953	Sowbhagya Lakshmi	Sowbhagya Lakshmi		
1954	Madiddunno Maharaya			
1954	Kanyadana			
1954	Muttiddella Chinna			
1955	Gandharva Kanya			
1955	Vichitra Prapancha			
1957	Prabhulinga Leele			
1959	Dharma Vijaya	Saradara Vijaya's wife		
1960	Aasha Sundari	Mithravinda		
1961	Nagarjuna	Subhadra		
1962	Nanda Deepa			
1962	Rathna Manjari			
1962	Karuneye Kutumbada Kannu		Cameo	
1962	Vidhivilasa	Mayadevi		
1963	Ananda Bashpa			
1964	Naandi	Ganga		
1964	Mangala Muhurta			
1964	Navajeevana		Cameo	
1964	Shivagange Mahathme			
1965	Pathivratha			
1965	Sarvagna Murthy			
1965	Amarajeevi			
1965	Ide Mahasudina			
1966	Subba Shastry			
1967	Sathi Sukanya			
1967	Sri Purandara Dasaru			
1967	Premakkoo Permitte		Producer	
1969	Namma Makkalu		Producer	
1970	Seetha		Producer	
1972	Naa Mechida Huduga		Producer	
