= Hunsur Krishnamurthy =

Indian filmmaker

- Born: 9 February 1914; Hunsur, Kingdom of Mysore, British India
- Died: 13 February 1989 (aged 75)
- Occupations: Playwright; film director; producer; actor; screenwriter; lyricist
- Relatives: H. R. Bhargava; Dwarakish

Hunsur Krishnamurthy (9 February 1914 – 13 February 1989) was an Indian playwright, film director, producer, actor, screenwriter and lyricist in Kannada cinema.

He worked with noted theatre personalities early in his career; Gubbi Veeranna, Mohammed Peer and B. R. Panthulu before entering films. As a film director, he made films mostly in the mythological genre such as Satya Harishchandra (1965), Bhakta Kumbara (1974) and Babruvahana (1977), all of which star Rajkumar. The films were major critical and commercial successes and are seen as milestones in Kannada cinema and in the career of Rajkumar.

== Career ==
=== Theatre ===
Prior to working in films, Krishnamurthy worked in theatre as a playwright, writing plays such as Swarga Samrajya. He then worked for the Bangalore-based Bharat Nataka Company as a playwright and a scenarist, following which, he had a stint at Bombay Talkies. He then worked as a part of Marathi stage actor Bal Gandharva's theatre troupe. During that time, he also worked with famed Kannada theatre personalities Gubbi Veeranna and Mohamed Peer. In 1936, during his work with the latter in his drama company Chandrakala Natak, he worked with B. R. Panthulu, another popular theatre personality at the time, in his play Samsara Nauke, as an assistant director.

=== Films ===
Krishnamurthy entered the Kannada cinema primarily as a dialogue writer for films such as Hemareddy Mallamma (1945) and Krishnaleele (1947). He also wrote the screenplay for the films. Writing lyrics for the soundtracks of films such as Kanyadana, (1954), Devakannika (1954) and Sodari (1955), he made his debut as a director in the 1958 mythological film Shree Krishna Gaarudi, that features Rajkumar in the lead role, an actor who would go on to dominate Kannada cinema as an actor for over two decades. Krishnamurthy followed this up with other films such as Veera Sankalpa (1964), Satya Harishchandra (1965), Sri Kannika Parameshwari Kathe (1966), Bhakta Kumbara (1974), Babruvahana (1977), Bhakta Siriyala (1980), Bhakta Dnyanadeva (1982) and Shiva Kotta Sowbhagya (1985). Most of his films in the mythological genre had Rajkumar playing the lead role. Commercial successes during the time, they were instrumental in shaping Rajkumar's career as an actor. His film Satya Harishchandra won the National Film Award for Best Feature Film in Kannada at the 13th National Film Awards, and is seen as a milestone in Kannada cinema. His 1977 film Veera Sindhoora Lakshmana, which was based on the life of Lakshmana, a freedom fighter who fought the British during the Indian freedom struggle, was major commercial success.

Actors M. P. Shankar and Rajesh were introduced by him in his films; Shankar in Rathnamanjari (1962) and Rajesh in Veera Sankalpa.

== Filmography ==
Year	Title	Language	Director	Producer	Screenwriter	Actor	Lyricist	Role	Notes
1945	Hemareddy Mallamma	Kannada			Yes				
1947	Krishnaleele	Kannada			Yes				
1950	Shiva Parvathi	Kannada		Yes					
1951	Janganmohini	Kannada			Yes				
1953	Sowbhagya Lakshmi	Kannada					Yes		
1954	Madiddunno Maharaya	Kannada				Yes			
1954	Kanyadana	Kannada			Yes				
1954	Devakannika	Kannada					Yes		
1955	Sodari	Kannada			Yes		Yes		
1956	Muttaide Bhagya	Kannada			Yes	Yes	Yes		
1957	Nala Damayanti	Kannada			Yes		Yes		
1958	Shree Krishna Gaarudi	Kannada	Yes				Yes		
1960	Aasha Sundari	Kannada	Yes		Yes		Yes		
1960	Bhakta Kanakadasa	Kannada			Yes		Yes		
1961	Mera Suhaag	Hindi	Yes						
1961	Nagarjuna	Kannada					Yes		
1961	Bhakta Cheta	Kannada					Yes		
1962	Shri Dharmasthala Mahatme	Kannada			Yes		Yes		
1962	Ratnamanjari	Kannada	Yes	Yes	Yes		Yes		
1964	Veera Sankalpa	Kannada	Yes	Yes	Yes	Yes	Yes		
1965	Satya Harishchandra	Kannada	Yes				Yes		Won, National Film Award for Best Feature Film in Kannada
1965	Maduve Madi Nodu	Kannada	Yes				Yes		
1966	Sri Kanyaka Parameshwari Kathe	Kannada	Yes	Yes	Yes		Yes		
1967	Devara Gedda Manava	Kannada	Yes				Yes		
1967	Devuni Gelichina Manavudu	Telugu	Yes				Yes		
1968	Adda Dari	Kannada	Yes	Yes		Yes	Yes		(final film role)
1971	Vishakanya	Kannada	Yes						
1972	Jaga Mechida Maga	Kannada	Yes				Yes		
1972	Bangaarada Manushya	Kannada					Yes		
1974	Bhakta Kumbara	Kannada	Yes		Yes		Yes		
1975	Mantra Shakthi	Kannada	Yes						
1977	Babruvahana	Kannada	Yes		Yes		Yes		
1977	Veera Sindhoora Lakshmana	Kannada	Yes		Yes		Yes		
1979	Kurubara Lakkanu Elizabeth Raniau	Kannada	Yes						
1980	Bhakta Siriyala	Kannada	Yes		Yes		Yes		
1980	Guru Sarvabhowma Sri Raghavendra Karune	Kannada	Yes						
1981	Edeyuru Siddalingeshwara Mahatme	Kannada	Yes						
1981	Shiva Mahima	Malayalam	Yes						
1982	Bhakta Dnyanadeva	Kannada	Yes						
1984	Shiva Kanye	Kannada	Yes		Yes		Yes		
1985	Shiva Kotta Sowbhagya	Kannada	Yes		Yes		Yes		

== Awards ==
National Film Awards

- 1965 - Best Kannada Film – Sathya Harishchandra
- 1965 - Third Best Kannada Film – Maduve Madi Nodu

Karnataka State Film Awards

- 1973-74 - Best Dialogue Writer – Boothayyana Maga Ayyu
- 1974-75 - Third Best Film – Bhaktha Kumbara
- 1981-82 - Best Dialogue Writer – Edeyooru Siddalingeshwara
- 1986-87 - Lt. Puttanna Kanagal Award
