= Pandari Bai =

Indian actress

- Born: Geetha; 18 September 1928; Bhatkal, Bombay Presidency, British India (now in Karnataka, India)
- Died: 29 January 2003 (aged 74); Chennai, Tamil Nadu, India
- Occupation: Actress
- Years active: 1943–2001
- Works: Full list
- Spouse: P. H. Rama Rao
- Relatives: Mynavathi (sister)
- Honours: Kalaimamani (1965)

Pandari Bai (18 September 1928 – 29 January 2003) was an Indian actress who worked in South Indian cinema, mostly in Kannada cinema during the 1950s, 1960s and 1970s. She is considered Kannada cinema's first successful heroine. She has acted as both heroine and mother to actors Rajkumar, M. G. Ramachandran and Sivaji Ganesan. She was the heroine in Rajkumar's debut movie Bedara Kannappa and also Sivaji's debut movie Parasakthi. She has acted in over 1,000 films in Kannada, Tamil, Telugu and Hindi. Bai was honoured by Kalaimamani from the Tamil Nadu government.

== Career ==
Pandaribai began her career in acting in plays based on mythological stories before making her film debut in 1943 with the Kannada language film, Vani. She appeared in the 1954 Kannada film Bedara Kannappa opposite Rajkumar. In the film, she played Neela, wife of Kanna (played by Rajkumar), a hunter. She established herself as a lead actress portraying a woman with a "progressive" image assuming the burdens of a feudal patriarchy in films such as Sant Sakhu (1955) and Rayara Sose (1957). In 1959, she appeared in Abba Aa Hudugi, with her sister Mynavathi. The film is considered a landmark in Kannada cinema.

Later in her career, she transitioned to playing maternal roles often for leading men older than her, and many of whom had previously played been her on-screen romantic co-stars.

== Personal life ==
Pandari was married to P. H. Rama Rao, a physician. The couple had no children.

Pandari Bai sustained injuries in a road accident in 1994, and lost her left arm. It was reported that she kept a low profile after that. She died on 29 January 2003 at a hospital in Chennai while being treated for kidney failure.

== Awards and honours ==
- The lesson "Gunasagari Pandari Bai" is added to the class IX Kannada Language Textbook in Karnataka state to honour the legendary actress.
- 2001 - Filmfare Awards South - Lifetime Achievement Award
- 1994–95 - Dr. Rajkumar Lifetime Achievement Award from Karnataka Government
- 1968–69 - Karnataka State Film Award for Best Supporting Actress - Namma Makkalu
- 1967–68 - Karnataka State Film Award for Best Supporting Actress - Belli Moda
- 1965 - Kalaimamani Award from Tamil Nadu Government
