= Narasimharaju (Kannada actor) =

Indian Kannada actor

T. R. Narasimharaju
- Born: Tipaturu Rama Raju Narasimha Raju; 24 July 1923; Tiptur, Mysore State, British India
- Died: 11 July 1979 (aged 55); Karnataka, India
- Other names: Hasya chakravarthi, Hasya Rathna
- Occupation: Actor
- Years active: 1954–1979
- Children: Narahari Raju (Son); Sudha Narasimharaju (Daughter); Dharmavathi Narasimharaju (Daughter)

Tiptur Ramaraju Narasimharaju (24 July 1923 – 11 July 1979) was an Indian actor in Kannada cinema. He was a comedy stalwart of the Kannada film industry and specialised in roles that required ample comic timing. He acted in more than 111 Kannada films between 1954 and 1979. He was also referred to as Hasya Chakravarti.

== Career ==
=== Theatre ===
Narasimharaju made his stage debut when he was 4 years old. The poverty prevailing in the house made his uncle Lakshmipathiraju take the young lad to the 'Chandramouleshwara Drama Company' run by C. B. Mallappa who happened to be touring Tiptur at the time. He played the roles of Prahlada, Lohithaswa, Krishna, Markanda among others. After some time, Narasimharaju left that company and formed his own troupe and enacted his roles from his now previous performances – Gora-Kumbara, and Harischandra. He soon joined "Edathorey Drama Company" after his troupe sustained losses. He took on the garb of a lady in the mythological Vishvamitra, Rama, Ravana, and Bharata among others. He spent the first 27 years of his acting career in professional drama companies. He donned different roles in the plays of different companies like "Shri Chandramauleshwara Nataka Sabha", "Hirannaiah Mitra Mandali", "Bharatha Lalitha Kala Sangha", "Gunda Joisara Company" of Belur, and Gubbi "Channabasaveshwara Nataka Company". He did not neglect these drama companies even after becoming hugely popular as a film actor.

=== Films ===
He made his film debut in 1954 when he acted in the film Bedara Kannappa alongside Rajkumar in the role of the son of the temple priest. Both were colleagues from the time they were in Gubbi Veeranna's drama company. Narasimharaju took inspiration from Charlie Chaplin. He is referred to by some as one of the greatest comedians of his time. It is also said that people would not have watched Kannada films in the 1960s if he did not star in them.

Though known for his comic timing, Narasmimharaju unfortunately spent his last days mourning the death of his son in an accident. He died aged 56 on 11 July 1979 at around 4.30 a.m. due to severe heart attack. After his death, an annual cine award, the Narasimharaju Prashasti was established in his memory. He was the busiest actor in the Kannada film industry, even actors like Rajkumar used to wait for his callsheet, and used to adjust to his dates. However, despite his iconic status among Kannadigas, it is ironic that he was not awarded even once either by the state or the central governments.

A comedian by profession, Narasimharaju was a family man and knew what he had to do for his family. Narasimharaju intelligently invested his earnings into building houses in the then Madras city and Bangalore. In fact, he was the first Kannada actor to own a house in Madras, even before the matinee idol Rajkumar and is even credited to have completed 100 films before Dr Rajkumar through the 1967 film, Nakkare Ade Swarga.

== Filmography ==
Year	Title	Role
1954	Bedara Kannapa	Kashinatha Shastry
1955	Sodari	
1956	Shiva Bhaktha Markandeya	
1956	Hari Bhaktha	
1956	Renuka Mahatme	
1957	Bhaktha Prahalada	
1957	Prabhulinga leale	
1957	Nala Damayanthi	
1958	School Master	Puttanna
1958	Chori Chori	Guest appearance
1959	Jagajyothi Basaveshwara	
1959	Dharma Vijaya	
1959	Abba Aa Hudugi	
1960	Rani Honnamma	
1960	Dashavataara	
1960	Makkala Rajya	
1960	Aasha Sundari	Maithreya
1960	Ranadheera Kanteerava	
1961	Kaivara Mahatme	
1961	Nagarjuna	
1961	Kittur Chennamma	
1961	Vijayanagarada Veera Putra	
1962	Vidhi Vilasa	
1962	Swarna Gowri	
1962	Gaali Gopura	
1962	Bhoodaana	
1962	Ratna Manjari	
1963	Sathi Shakthi	
1963	Nanda Deepa	
1963	Jenu Goodu	Stage actor
1963	Veera Kesari	
1963	Saaku Magalu	
1963	Jeevana Taranga	
1963	Vaalmiki	
1963	Malli Maduve	
1964	Chandra Kumara	
1964	Chinnada Gombe	
1964	Amara Shilpi Jakana Chari	
1964	Shivaratri Mahatme	
1964	Pratigne	
1964	Nava Jeevana	Supporting Actor
1965	Chandrahasa	
1965	Vatsalya	
1965	Miss Leelavati	
1965	Nanna Karthavya	
1965	Sathya Harichandra	
1965	Amarajeevi	
1965	Pathala Mohini	
1965	Baalaraajana Kathe	
1966	Sri Kanyaka Parameshwari Kathe	
1966	Love in Bangalore	
1966	Thugu Deepa	
1967	Manassiddare Maarga	
1967	Rajashekara	
1967	Bhaktha Kanakadasa	
1967	Bangaarada Hoovu	
1967	Devara Gedda Manava	
1967	Immadi Pulikesi	
1967	Gange Gowri	
1967	Nakkare Ade Swarga	Hero
1967	Lagna Pathrike	
1967	Black Market	
1967	Padaveedhara	
1967	Premakkoo Permitte	
1968	Manasakshi	
1968	Simha Swapna	
1968	Jedara Bale	
1968	Goa Dalli CID 999	
1968	Namma Ooru	
1968	Gandhinagara	
1968	Bangalore Mail	Supporting Actor
1968	Rowdi Ranganna	
1968	Amma	
1969	Bhale Bhasava	
1969	Operation Jackpot Nalli C.I.D 999	Supporting Actor
1969	Kaadina Rahasya	
1969	Eradu Mukha	
1970	Modala Raatri	Shankar
1970	Hasiru Thorana	
1970	Aliya Geleya	Shekhar and Muniya (Double Role)
1970	Nadina Bhagya	
1970	Bhoopathi Ranga	
1970	Lakshmi Saraswathi	
1970	Sri Krishnadevaraya	Tenali Ramakrishna
1970	Rangamahal Rahasya	
1971	Kula Gourava	Gopu
1971	Kasturi Nivasa	
1971	Anugraha	
1971	Malathi Madhava	
1971	Namma Badaku	
1971	Jatakaratna Gundaa Joisa	Lead Hero
1971	Prathidwani	
1971	Sharapanjara	Guest role
1972	Yava Janmumada Mythri	
1972	Naari Munidare Maari	
1973	Gandhada Gudi	Shivaji Role
1973	Devaru Kotta Thangi	
1974	Professor Huchchuraya	Lead Hero & Producer
1975	Onde Roopa Eradu Guna	
1975	Aashirvaada	
1976	Aparadhi	
1977	Lakshmi Nivasa	
1977	Kittu Puttu	Guest Appearance
1977	Yella Hanakkagi	
1978	Maathu Thappadha Maga	
1978	Vasantha Lakshmi	
1978	Kiladi Kittu	
1978	Nammuru	
1978	Sneha Sedu	
1979	Preethi Madu Tamashe Nodu	
1979	Asadhya Aliya	
1980	Manjina There	

== Sources ==
- HSK. "T. R. Narasimharaju: Humorous Actor". Star of Mysore. OurKarnataka.Com, Inc.
