= Dr. Rajkumar filmography =

Filmography of Indian actor Rajkumar

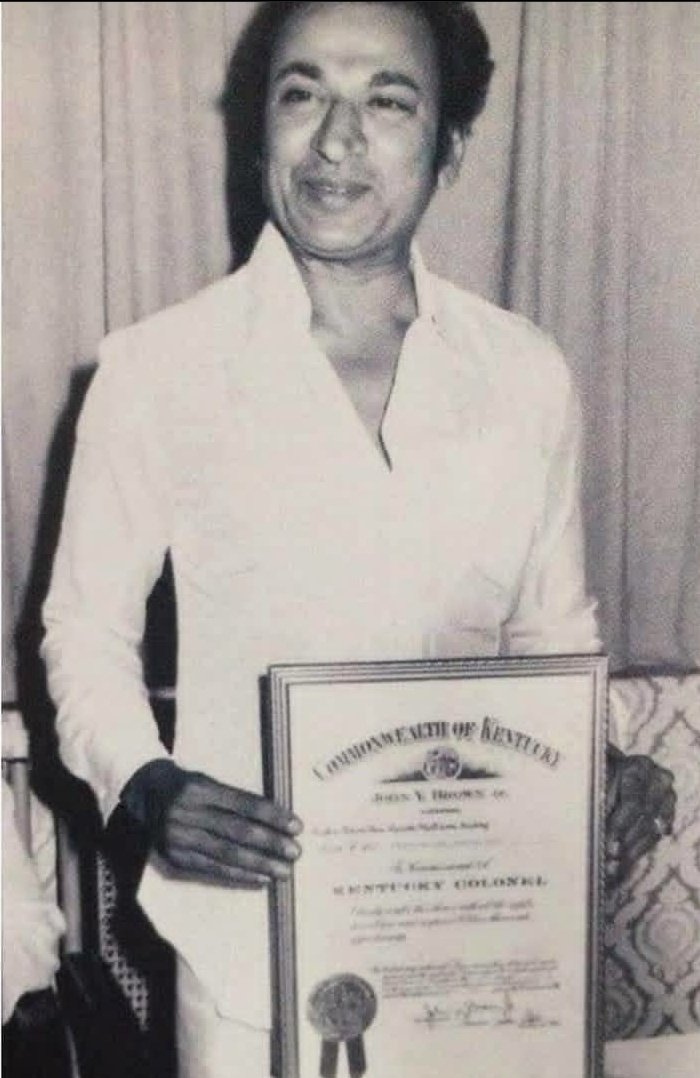
Dr. Rajkumar receives the Kentucky Colonel, the highest title of honor bestowed by the Commonwealth of Kentucky. He remains the only Indian actor to receive the honor.

Singanalluru Puttaswamaiah Muthuraj (24 April 1929 – 12 April 2006), better known by his stage name Dr. Rajkumar, was an Indian actor and singer who worked in Kannada cinema. Through his over five-decade long career of over 200 films, he was regarded one of the most pivotal and influential figures of the Kannada film industry. His films were praised for acting as a bridge between the popular and art films because of the theme of the story and their treatment. He debuted as a child actor in the 1942 Kannada film Bhakta Prahlada. His first role as an adult came in Sri Srinivasa Kalyana (1952) and as a lead, two years later, in Bedara Kannappa, which gave him stardom. He debuted as a singer with the track Om Namaha Shivaya from the 1956 film Ohileshwara. In 1960, he made his debut as a producer by producing Ranadheera Kanteerava. According to Ashish Rajadhyaksha and Paul Willemen in the book Encyclopaedia of Indian Cinema, Ranadheera Kanteerava was the first "big hit" in Kannada cinema. In a film career spanning fifty years, Rajkumar received eleven Karnataka State Film Awards, including nine Best Actor and two Best Singer awards, eight Filmfare Awards South, and one National Film Award. Along with Vishnuvardhan and Ambareesh, he is counted in Kannada cinema's "triumvirate" as its most celebrated actor.

In 1983, Rajkumar was honoured with the Padma Bhushan, India's third highest civilian award, for his contributions to Indian cinema, and the Dadasaheb Phalke Award in 1995. In 1985, he became the first Indian actor to receive the Kentucky Colonel, an honorary order from the governor of Kentucky, United States. On the occasion of the "Centenary of Indian Cinema" in April 2013, Forbes included his performance in Bangaarada Manushya on its list of "25 Greatest Acting Performances of Indian Cinema". Upon his death, The New York Times had described him as one of India's most popular movie stars. He received the NTR National Award in 2002 and was awarded an honorary doctorate from the University of Mysore. Dr. Rajkumar Samagra Charithre - a two-volume book by film critic D. Rukkoji on the life and achievements of Rajkumar won the Swarna Kamal Award at the 63rd National Film Awards under the National Film Award for Best Book on Cinema category. On the occasion of Rajkumar's 100th film Government of Karnataka honored him with the title of Nata Saarvabhouma. He is also the first film star to win the National Film Award for Best Male Playback Singer for the song Naadamaya Ee Lokavella from the film Jeevana Chaitra. The State Government established Dr. Rajkumar Award in 1993–94 to be given for lifetime achievement towards contributions to Kannada cinema.

Dr. Rajkumar's 1972 film Bangaarada Manushya was the longest running South Indian film at the time of its release. The film elevated him from being just another very popular actor to nearly demigod status among the masses. His 1986 film Anuraga Aralithu was the first Indian film to be remade in seven other languages. His 1973 film Gandhada Gudi was reported to be the first Indian film to be made on the concept of protection of forest and wildlife conservation with a focus on the need to preserve the flora and fauna at a time when the CITES treaty was signed with an aim to reduce the economic incentive to poach endangered species. The British daily newspaper The Guardian praised him for his subtle acting and described him as a humble, modest being who was a symbol of Kannada consciousness. ABC News acknowledged him as one of the greatest actors of his time and called him The Gentle Giant of Karnataka. In 2016, the Maharashtra State Government had prescribed the biography of the actor for its class VIII students detailing his achievements and contributions to the Kannada culture under the title Natasarvabhouma. In 1989, the critical failure of Parashuram led him to take a hiatus from acting. However, he returned to acting three years later, in 1992 with Jeevana Chaitra, which was a blockbuster running for more than a year in theatres. His final film was 2000's Shabdavedhi. He had a minimum of ten releases in each of the years from 1963 to 1971. He held the record for highest releases as a lead in a single year (16 in 1968) in Kannada movies for 24 years until it was broken by Malashri in 1992 with 19 releases. His 39 movies have been remade 63 times in 9 languages by 34 actors making him the first actor whose movies were remade more than fifty times and the first actor whose movies were remade in nine languages. 90% of his movies are considered to be successful.

== Filmography ==
Year	Film	Role	Notes	Ref.
1942	Bhakta Prahlada	school-going child	Appearance as child artist	
1952	Sri Srinivasa Kalyana	Agastya Maharshi	Cameo	
1954	Bedara Kannappa	Kannappa/Dinna/Manimantha (Note: Rajkumar played one character with three names)	Debut as a lead actor	
1954	Kalahasti Mahatyam	Thinnayya/Kannappa (Note: Rajkumar played one character with two names)	Telugu film	
1955	Sodari	Kailasanatha		
1956	Bhakta Vijaya	Santhoba Pavar		
1956	Hari Bhakta	Hari/Pundarika(Pundaleeka)		
1956	Ohileshwara	Ohila		
1957	Sati Nalaayini	Kaushikha		
1957	Rayara Sose	Dr. Govind Rao		
1958	Bhookailasa	Ravana		
1958	Shree Krishna Gaarudi	Arjuna		
1958	Anna Thangi	Mallanna		
1959	Jagajyothi Basveshwara	King Bijjala		
1959	Dharma Vijaya	Saradara Vijaya		
1959	Mahishasura Mardini	Mahishasura		
1959	Abba Aa Hudugi	Suresh	Extended Cameo	
1960	Ranadheera Kanteerava	Kanthirava Narasaraja I		
1960	Rani Honnamma	Veeranayaka		
1960	Aasha Sundari	Gunasheela		
1960	Dashavathara	Jaya/ Hiranyakashipu/ Ravana/ Shishupala (Note: Rajkumar played four distinct characters in the film)		
1960	Bhakta Kanakadasa	Kanaka Dasa/Thimmanayaka		
1961	Sri Shaila Mahathme	Chandragupta		
1961	Kittur Chennamma	Raja Mallasaraja		
1961	Kantheredu Nodu	Gopi		
1961	Kaiwara Mahathme	Narayanappa		
1961	Bhakta Cheta	Cheta		
1961	Nagarjuna	Nagarjuna		
1962	Gaali Gopura	Krishna		
1962	Bhoodaana	Dasanna		
1962	Swarna Gowri	Kalinga/Chandrashekhara		
1962	Devasundari	Gandharva Shankhapala		
1962	Karuneye Kutumbada Kannu	Kumar		
1962	Mahathma Kabir	Kabir Das		
1962	Vidhivilasa	Madhava Simha		
1962	Thejaswini	Shivappa Nayaka		
1963	Nanda Deepa	Shankar		
1963	Saaku Magalu	Raghuram		
1963	Kanyarathna	Raju		
1963	Gowri	Ramaiah		
1963	Jeevana Tharanga	Kumar		
1963	Malli Maduve	Ananda/Paramananda (Note: Rajkumar played dual roles in the film.)		
1963	Kulavadhu	Suryanarayana "Soori"		
1963	Kalitharu Henne	Chandrayya		
1963	Veerakesari	Narasimhanayaka		
1963	Valmiki	Raksha/ Valmiki		
1963	Mana Mecchida Madadi	Srinath		
1963	Chandra Kumara	Prachanda		
1963	Santha Thukaram	Tukaram		
1963	Sri Ramanjaneya Yuddha	Rama		
1963	Sathi Shakthi	Virupaksha/Rakthaksha		
1964	Navakoti Narayana	Purandara Dasa/Srinivasanayaka		
1964	Chandavalliya Thota	Hanumanna		
1964	Shivarathri Mahathme	Vijaya		
1964	Annapoorna	Krishna		
1964	Tumbida Koda	Ramachandra		
1964	Shivagange Mahathme	Ashoka		
1964	Muriyada Mane	Chennegowda		
1964	Prathigne	Dr. Shankar		
1964	Naandi	Murthy		
1965	Naga Pooja	Nagakumara		
1965	Chandrahasa	Chandrahasa		
1965	Sarvagna Murthy	Sarvajna		
1965	Vaatsalya	Rajashekhar "Raju"		
1965	Satya Harishchandra	Veeradasu/Harishchandra		
1965	Mahasathi Anasuya	Narada		
1965	Ide Mahasudina	Dr. Anand		
1965	Bettada Huli	Raju		
1965	Sati Savithri	Satyavan		
1965	Maduve Madi Nodu	Vasu		
1965	Pathivratha	Gopal		
1966	Mantralaya Mahatme	Venkatanatha Bhatta/Raghvendra Swamy		
1966	Katari Veera	Vijaya		
1966	Bala Nagamma	Anandavardhana		
1966	Thoogudeepa	Ramachandra		
1966	Premamayi	Madhava "Maadhu"		
1966	Kilaadi Ranga	Sanjaya/Ranga		
1966	Madhumalathi	Trivikramasena		
1966	Emme Thammanna	Murali/Thammanna		
1966	Mohini Bhasmasura	Bhasmasura		
1966	Sri Kannika Parameshwari Kathe	Vishnuvardhana		
1966	Sandhya Raga	Lakshmana		
1967	Anuradha	Himself	Cameo	
1967	Parvathi Kalyana	Shiva		
1967	Sathi Sukanya	Chyavana Maharshi		
1967	Gange Gowri	Shiva		
1967	Rajashekara	Shekharavarma		
1967	Lagna Pathrike	Raghuram		
1967	Rajadurgada Rahasya	Ramanna Nayaka/Somanna Nayaka		
1967	Devara Gedda Manava	Vijaya		
1967	Beedi Basavanna	Gopal Rao		
1967	Manassiddare Maarga	Ramachandra "Ramu" Rao		
1967	Bangarada Hoovu	Anand		
1967	Chakra Theertha	Srinivasa		
1967	Immadi Pulakeshi	Pulakeshin II		
1968	Jedara Bale	Prakash (CID 999)		
1968	Gandhinagara	Shekhar/Mahadevayya		
1968	Mahasathi Arundathi	Vasishtha		
1968	Manassakshi	Somanna		
1968	Sarvamangala	Nataraja		
1968	Bhagya Devathe	Chaduranga		
1968	Bangalore Mail	Shyamsundar		
1968	Hannele Chiguridaga	Prasad		
1968	Bhagyada Bagilu	Raju		
1968	Nata Sarvabhouma	Himself	Documentary	
1968	Rowdi Ranganna	Ranga		
1968	Dhoomaketu	Kumar		
1968	Amma	Sridhar		
1968	Simhaswapna	Manohara		
1968	Goa Dalli CID 999	Prakash (CID 999)		
1968	Mannina Maga	Raju		
1969	Margadarshi	Srikaanth		
1969	Gandondu Hennaru	Anand Rao		
1969	Mallammana Pavada	Chandrakantha		
1969	Choori Chikkanna	Chikkanna/Bhaskar		
1969	Punarjanma	Chenna		
1969	Bhale Raja	Shivaraj/Raju		
1969	Uyyale	Krishnegowda		
1969	Chikkamma	Sundar		
1969	Mayor Muthanna	Mutthanna		
1969	Operation Jackpot Nalli C.I.D 999	Prakash (CID 999)		
1970	Sri Krishnadevaraya	Krishnadevaraya		
1970	Karulina Kare	Parameshi		
1970	Hasiru Thorana	Madhu		
1970	Bhoopathi Ranga	Bhaskar/Bhoopathi Ranga		
1970	Mr. Rajkumar	Raj/Kumar/Farooq Baba (Note: Rajkumar played one character with three names)		
1970	Bhale Jodi	Ramesh/Suresh		
1970	C.I.D. Rajanna	CID Rajanna		
1970	Nanna Thamma	Prasad		
1970	Baalu Belagithu	Shankar/Paapanna		
1970	Devara Makkalu	Ranga		
1970	Paropakari	Mohan/Ramanna		
1970	Nadina Bhagya	Balu	Extended Cameo	
1971	Kasturi Nivasa	Ravi Varma		
1971	Baala Bandhana	Ranga		
1971	Kula Gourava	Raja Raghunatha Rao/Ravi (Chandrashekharaiah)/ Dr. Anand (Note: Rajkumar played triple role in the film)		
1971	Namma Samsara	Krishna		
1971	Kasidre Kailasa	Gopinath		
1971	Thayi Devaru	Krishna		
1971	Pratidwani	Ashok		
1971	Sakshatkara	Mahesh		
1971	Nyayave Devaru	Raghu		
1971	Sri Krishna Rukmini Satyabhama	Krishna		
1972	Janma Rahasya	Kumar		
1972	Sipayi Ramu	Ramu/Ram Singh		
1972	Bangaarada Manushya	Rajeeva		
1972	Hrudaya Sangama	Rajanna/Kumar		
1972	Kranti Veera	Chandrakumara/Vijay		
1972	Bhale Huchcha	Gopi		
1972	Nanda Gokula	Anand		
1972	Jaga Mecchida Maga	Aaditya		
1973	Devaru Kotta Thangi	Raghu		
1973	Bidugade	M. B. Shekhar		
1973	Swayamvara	Nataraj		
1973	Gandhada Gudi	Kumar		
1973	Doorada Betta	Shiva		
1973	Mooroovare Vajragalu	Narada / Krishna		
1974	Bangaarada Panjara	Beera		
1974	Eradu Kanasu	Ramachandraraya		
1974	Sampathige Saval	Veerabhadra		
1974	Bhakta Kumbara	Gora Kumbhar		
1974	Sri Srinivasa Kalyana	Lord Srinivasa		
1975	Daari Tappida Maga	Prasad / Prakash (Prashanth)		
1975	Mayura	Mayurasharma		
1975	Thrimurthy	Sridhar / Vijay / Shekhar / Sheshagiri (Note: Rajkumar played one character with four names)		
1976	Premada Kanike	Manohar		
1976	Bahaddur Gandu	Panju		
1976	Raja Nanna Raja	Raja		
1976	Naa Ninna Mareyalare	Anand		
1976	Badavara Bandhu	Ranganatha "Ranga"		
1977	Babruvahana	Babruvahana / Arjuna		
1977	Bhagyavantharu	Kumar		
1977	Giri Kanye	Chenna		
1977	Sanaadi Appanna	Appanna		
1977	Olavu Geluvu	Mohan		
1978	Shankar Guru	Rajashekhar (Jayraj)/ Shankar/ Gurumurthy		
1978	Operation Diamond Racket	Prakash (CID 999)		
1978	Thayige Thakka Maga	Kumar		
1979	Huliya Haalina Mevu	Chengumani		
1979	Nanobba Kalla	Gopi/Chandrasekhar		
1980	Ravichandra	Ravi/Chandra		
1980	Vasanta Geetha	Vasanth		
1981	Haavina Hede	Mutthanna/Raj		
1981	Nee Nanna Gellalare	Srikanth		
1981	Keralida Simha	Shankar		
1981	Bhagyavantha	Unnamed character	Cameo	
1982	Hosa Belaku	Ravi		
1982	Haalu Jenu	Rangaswamy		
1982	Chalisuva Modagalu	Mohan		
1983	Kaviratna Kalidasa	Kalidasa/ Dushyanta (Note: Rajkumar played two distinct characters in the film)		
1983	Kaamana Billu	Suryanarayana "Soori"		
1983	Bhakta Prahlada	Hiranyakashipu		
1983	Eradu Nakshatragalu	Vijaya		
1984	Samayada Gombe	Anil/Gurumurthy		
1984	Shravana Banthu	Raghu/Kumar/Peter (Note: Rajkumar played one character with three names)		
1984	Yarivanu	Bhaskar		
1984	Apoorva Sangama	Santhosh/Gopi		
1985	Ade Kannu	Jagannatha Rao/Gopi		
1985	Jwaalamukhi	Jayasimha		
1985	Dhruva Thare	Sagar		
1986	Bhagyada Lakshmi Baramma	Panduranga		
1986	Anuraga Aralithu	Shankar		
1986	Guri	Kaliprasad		
1987	Ondu Muttina Kathe	Aithu		
1987	Shruthi Seridaaga	Dr. G. N. Murthy		
1988	Devatha Manushya	Krishna Murthy		
1988	Shiva Mecchida Kannappa	Shiva	Special Appearance	
1989	Parashuram	Parashuram		
1992	Jeevana Chaitra	Vishwanathaiah		
1993	Aakasmika	Narasimha Murthy		
1994	Odahuttidavaru	Ramanna		
1994	Gandhada Gudi Part 2	Kumar	Special Appearance	
2000	Shabdavedhi	Sandeep		

== See also ==
- List of songs recorded by Rajkumar
- Kannada cinema
