= List of songs recorded by Rajkumar =

Dr. Rajkumar has sung approximately 300 songs in movies and an excess of 400 devotional (non-film) songs in Kannada. Rajkumar trained in classical music when he was with Gubbi Veeranna's theatre troupe. The track Om Namaha Shivaya from the 1956 film Ohileshwara, which he also starred in, was his first song for a film. He subsequently sang "Thumbithu Manava", a duet with S. Janaki, for the movie Mahishasura Mardini (1959). However, he became a full-fledged singer only in 1974 when he sang in place of P. B. Sreenivas for Sampathige Savaal, who had till then sung for most songs picturized on Rajkumar, fell ill. Rajkumar sang the energetic Yaare Koogadali for the film which became widely popular during the time and is considered one of his best songs.

Rajkumar has been credited for having sung across various genres and each rendition according to the mood of the scene in the film. In "Yaaru Tiliyaru Ninna" for Babruvahana (1977), a prosodic form of Kannada poetry that required the tone to be a combination of sarcasm and anger, he blended the twin skills of theatrics and music. For Nee Nanna Gellalare (1981), he sang two songs—"Jeeva Hoovagide" and "Anuraga Enaytu"—beginning both with the refrain "I love you", that is full of Carnatic gamakas. After the same tone in the refrain, they take on a life of their own with the form according to love and happiness in the former and love but a discord in the latter. He is known widely for his rendition of "Nadamaya" for Jeevana Chaitra (1992), a song based on the raga of Todi and with complex graces and strings other ragas as it progresses. He switches ragas with ease, and sings complex swara patterns like a professional classical artiste. For the rendition, he was awarded the National Film Award for Best Male Playback Singer.

== Film songs ==
=== 1950s ===
Year	Title	Song	Composer(s)	Co-singer(s)	Ref
1956	Ohileshwara	"Om Namah Shivaaya"	G. K. Venkatesh		
1959	Mahishasura Mardini	"Thumbithu Manava"	G. K. Venkatesh	S. Janaki	

=== 1970s ===
Year	Title	Song	Composer(s)	Co-singer(s)	Ref
1974	Sampathige Savaal	"Yaare Koogadali"	G. K. Venkatesh		
1974	Sri Srinivasa Kalyana	"Naane Bhagyavathi" "Cheluvina Thaare"	Rajan–Nagendra	S. Janaki	
1975	Daari Tappida Maga	"Naariye Seere Kadda"	G. K. Venkatesh		
1975	Mayura	"Naaniruvude Ninagagi" "Ee Mounava Taalenu"	G. K. Venkatesh	S. Janaki	
1975	Thrimurthy	"Le Le Appana Magale" "Enu Maadali Naanu" "Moogana Kaadidarenu" "Hannu Maagide"	G. K. Venkatesh	S. Janaki	
1976	Premada Kanike	"Baanigondu Elle" "Idu Yaaru Barida" "Naguveya Henne" "Naa Bidalare"	Upendra Kumar	H. P. Geetha; Vani Jayaram	
1976	Bahaddur Gandu	"Maanavanaaguveya" "Muthinantha Maathondu" "Hey Ninagagiye"	M. Ranga Rao	solo	
1976	Raja Nanna Raja	"Thanuvu Manuvu" "Kalletigintha Naana"	G. K. Venkatesh	S. Janaki	
1976	Naa Ninna Mareyalare	"Naa Ninna" "Nannaseya Hoove" "Elleli Nodali"	Rajan-Nagendra	Vani Jayaram; S. Janaki	
1976	Badavara Bandhu	"Ninna Kangala" "Ninna Nudiyu"	M. Ranga Rao	solo	
1977	Babruvahana	"Ee Samaya Anandamaya" "Aaradhisuve Madanaari" "Barasidilu Badidanthe" "Yaaru Thiliyaru Ninna"	T. G. Lingappa	S. Janaki; P. B. Sreenivas	
1977	Bhagyavantharu	"Ninna Snehake" "Ninna Nanna Manavu"	Rajan-Nagendra	P. Susheela	
1977	Giri Kanye	"Enendu Naa Helali" "Yaaru Neenu" "Thai Thai Bangari" "Koodi Baalona" "Nagunagutha Nee Baruve"	Rajan-Nagendra	S. P. Balasubrahmanyam; S. Janaki	
1977	Sanaadi Appanna	"Raaga Anuraaga" "Ninagagi Ododi Bande"	G. K. Venkatesh	S. Janaki	
1977	Olavu Geluvu	"Sangeethave Nee Nudiyuva Mathella" "Naa Helalaare" "Giniye Nanna Araginiye"	G. K. Venkatesh	S. Janaki	
1978	Shankar Guru	"Cheluveya Nota Chenna" "Love Me Or Hate Me" "Eneno Aase" "Chinna Baalalli Ee Raatri" "Naa Benkiyanthe"	Upendra Kumar	Vani Jayaram; P. B. Sreenivas	
1978	Operation Diamond Racket	"If You Come Today" "Alli Illi Noduve" "Nee Naduguve Eke"	G. K. Venkatesh	S. Janaki	
1978	Thayige Thakka Maga	"Entha Sogasu" "Sooryana Kaanthige" "Vishwanathanu Thandeyadare" "Chali Chali Nadukavu"	T. G. Lingappa	Kasthuri Shankar; S. Janaki	
1979	Huliya Haalina Mevu	"Chinnada Mallige Hoove" "Aase Heluvaase" "Beladingalagi Baa" "Rajadhi Raja"	G. K. Venkatesh	S. Janaki; P. Susheela	
1979	Nanobba Kalla	"Kopavethake Nannali" "Araluthide Moha" "Nanobba Kallanu" "Aaseyu Kaigoodithu"	Rajan-Nagendra	S. Janaki	

=== 1980s ===
Year	Title	Song	Composer(s)	Co-singer(s)	Ref
1980	Ravichandra	"Sathyabhame" "Naa Ninna Aase Kande" "Idu Rama Mandira" "O Entha Soundarya Kande" "Nasu Nagutha"	Upendra Kumar	S. Janaki; Sulochana	
1980	Vasantha Geetha	"Kannalle Eno" "Aatavenu Notavenu" "Haayada Ee Sanje" "Neenado Mathella"	M. Ranga Rao	Vani Jayaram; S. Janaki	
1981	Haavina Hede	"Bisi Bisi Kajjaya" "My Name is Raj" "Hoovinda Bareva Katheya" "Bere Enu Beda Endigu"	G. K. Venkatesh	Vani Jayaram	
1981	Nee Nanna Gellalare	"Jeeva Hoovagide" "Nanna Neenu Gellalare" "Anuraga Yenaythu"	Ilaiyaraaja	S. Janaki	
1981	Bhagyavantha	"Thilidavaro Moodaro" "Guruvara Banthamma"	T. G. Lingappa	solo	
1981	Keralida Simha	"Ondu Maathu Nanage Gotthu" "Amma Neenu Namagagi" "Thiliyade Nanage" "Eno Moha Eko Daaha"	Satyam	Sulochana; P. B. Sreenivas; Vani Jayaram	
1982	Hosa Belaku	"Hosabelaku Mooduthide" "Cheluveye Ninna Nodalu" "Neenade Baalige Jyothi" "Ravi Neenu Aagasadinda" "Kanneera Dhaare Ideke"	M. Ranga Rao	Vani Jayaram; S. Janaki	
1982	Haalu Jenu	"Aneya Mele Ambari" "Haayagi Kulithiru" "Baalu Belakayithu" "Haalu Jenu Ondaada Haage"	G. K. Venkatesh	Sulochana; Saritha	
1982	Chalisuva Modagalu	"My Lord Nanna Vaada" "Jenina Holeyo" "Chandira Thanda" "Neenello Naanalle"	Rajan-Nagendra	S. Janaki	
1983	Kaviratna Kalidasa	"Belli Moodithu" "Albyaad Kane Sumkire" "Maanikya Veenam" "Sadaa Kannali" "O Priyathama"	M. Ranga Rao	Vani Jayaram	
1983	Kaamana Billu	"Baa Muthu Koduve" "Kannu Kannu Kalethaga" "Indu Ananda Naa Thalalare"	Upendra Kumar	Vani Jayaram	
1983	Bhakta Prahlada	"Priyadim Bandu" "Hey Sarasijodbhava" "Sigivem Kshanadali" "Laali Laali Sukumara" "Ela Elavo"	T. G. Lingappa	Vani Jayaram	
1983	Eradu Nakshatragalu	"Eke Malli Hange" "Gelathi Baaradu Intha Samaya" "Howdu Endare"	G. K. Venkatesh	Vani Jayaram; Master Lohith	
1984	Samayada Gombe	"Chinnada Gombeyalla" "Sankochava Bidu" "Aakasha Kelageke" "Nanna Saradara" "Kogile Haadide Kelideya"	M. Ranga Rao	S. Janaki	
1984	Shravana Banthu	"Hosa Balina Hosilali" "Banina Anchinda Bande" "Mary Mary Mary" "Shravana Masa Bandaga" "Ide Raagadalli"	M. Ranga Rao	Vani Jayaram	
1984	Yarivanu	"Raagavo Anuraagavo" "Kaveri Eke Oduve" "Akashade Haaraduva"	Rajan-Nagendra	S. Janaki; Master Lohith	
1984	Apoorva Sangama	"Thara O Thara" "Aralide Thanu Mana" "Bangari Nanna Vayyari" "Bhagya Ennale"	Upendra Kumar	S. Janaki; Ramesh Chandra	
1985	Ade Kannu	"Nayana Nayana" "Ninnee Naguve Arunodayavu" "Ide Nota Ide Aata" "Ade Kannu"	G. K. Venkatesh	Bangalore Latha; P. B. Sreenivas; Vani Jayaram	
1985	Jwaalamukhi	"Eko Eno Ee Nanna Manavu" "Heluvudu Ondu Maaduvudu Innondu" "Nodi Nodi Ella Nodi" "Baale Prema Geethe"	M. Ranga Rao	Bangalore Latha; S. Janaki	
1985	Dhruva Thare	"Aa Moda Baanalli" "Aa Rathiye Dharegilidanthe" "O Nalle Savinudiya Hele" "Nyayavelli Adagide"	Upendra Kumar	Vani Jayaram; Bangalore Latha; S. Janaki	
1986	Bhagyada Lakshmi Baramma	"Enu Maayavo" "Nee Atthare" "Innu Hatthira" "Yaava Kaviyu" "Ananda Ananda"	Singeetham Srinivasa Rao	Vani Jayaram; B. R. Chaya; P. Susheela; Chi. Dattaraj	
1986	Anuraga Aralithu	"Shrikanta Vishakanta" "Nee Nadedare Sogasu" "Ganga Yamuna Sangama" "Sarthakavayithu"	Upendra Kumar	S. Janaki	
1986	Guri	"Allah Allah" "Vasantha Kala Bandaga" "Thangaliyanthe" "Kallina Veeneya"	Rajan-Nagendra	Rathnamala Prakash	
1987	Ondu Muttina Kathe	"Mutthondu Thande" "Mallige Hoovinanthe" "Ondu Eradu" "Melinda Hunnime"	L. Vaidyanathan	Rathnamala Prakash; Sunil, Sowmya; Shankar Nag	
1987	Shruthi Seridaaga	"Bombeyattavayya" "Nagalarade" "Raaga Jeevana" "Shruthi Seride"	T. G. Lingappa	Vani Jayaram; S. Janaki	
1988	Shiva Mecchida Kannappa	"Maayeya Thereyanu" "Ellaru Maduvudu"	T. G. Lingappa	solo	
1988	Devatha Manushya	"Hrudayadali Idenidu" "Ee Sogasada Sanje" "Haalalladaru Haaku" "Ninnantha Appa Illa"	Upendra Kumar	Manjula Gururaj; B. R. Chaya	
1988	Ranaranga	"Jagave Ondu Ranaranga"	Hamsalekha	solo	
1989	Nanjundi Kalyana	"Baduke Hasiru"	Upendra Kumar	solo	
1989	Parashuram	"Saradara Baa Baalina" "Thandana Thandana" "Nagutha Nagutha Baalu"	Hamsalekha	Swarnalatha; Manjula Gururaj	

=== 1990s ===
Year	Title	Song	Composer(s)	Co-singer(s)	Ref
1990	Ashwamedha	"Ashwamedha"	Sangeetha Raja	solo	
1990	Aasegobba Meesegobba	"Ella Burude Illi"	Upendra Kumar	solo	
1991	Modada Mareyalli	"Manadalli Aaseye Bere"	Rajan-Nagendra	solo	
1991	Kalyana Mantapa	"Ombathu Ombathu"	Upendra Kumar	solo	
1991	Hrudaya Haadithu	"Naliyuta Hrudaya Haadanu Haadide"	Upendra Kumar	solo	
1992	Jeevana Chaitra	"Ninna Cheluva Vadana" "Nannavalu Nannedeya" "Aralida Thanuvidu" "Manavanagi Huttidamele" "Lakshmi Baramma" "Nadamaya Ee Lokavella"	Upendra Kumar	Manjula Gururaj	
1992	Mannina Doni	"Megha Banthu Megha"	Hamsalekha	solo	
1992	Purushotthama	"Shiva Shiva Iva Shiva" "Naanu Nimmavanu"	Hamsalekha	solo	
1992	Saptapadi	"Sapthapadi Idu Sapthapadi"	Upendra Kumar	solo	
1993	Muddina Maava	"Deepavali Deepavali" "Kannappa Kottanu Kannanu"	S. P. Balasubrahmanyam	Manjula Gururaj; S. P. Balasubrahmanyam	
1993	Ananda Jyothi	"Amma Enuva"	Vijay Anand	solo	
1993	Aakasmika	"Anuragada Bhoga" "Ee Kannigoo Hennigoo" "Baaluvantha Hoove" "Agumbeya Prema Sanjeya" "Huttidare Kannada Nadalli"	Hamsalekha	Manjula Gururaj	
1993	Anuragada Alegalu	"Jeeva Kogile Inchara"	Hamsalekha	solo	
1993	Chirabandhavya	"Baaligu Bhoomigu"	Hamsalekha	solo	
1993	Hoovu Hannu	"Thaayi Thaayi"	Hamsalekha	K. S. Chithra	
1993	Mangalya Bandhana	"Gaandhari"	Hamsalekha	solo	
1993	Midida Hrudayagalu	"Thande Kodiso Seere"	Hamsalekha	solo	
1993	Munjaneya Manju	"Kaalada Kaiyolage"	solo		
1993	Jaga Mechida Huduga	"Ello Udurida Hoovu"	Rajan-Nagendra	solo	
1993	Navibbaru Namagibbaru	"Mai Gada Gada Naduguva"	Upendra Kumar	solo	
1994	Odahuttidavaru	"Madhura Ee Kshana" "Nambi Kettavarillavo" "Naanu Naanu Neenu" "Sole Geluvendu Baalali"	Upendra Kumar	Manjula Gururaj; S. P. Balasubrahmanyam; Sangeetha Katti	
1994	Megha Maale	"Megha Maale"	Hamsalekha	solo	
1994	Gandhada Gudi Part 2	"Naavaduva Nudiye"	Rajan-Nagendra	solo	
1994	Gandugali	"Ondu Maathanaadade"	Sadhu Kokila	solo	
1995	Karulina Kudi	"O Malle Hoove"	Rajan-Nagendra	solo	
1995	Kavya	"Aasegala Lokadali"	Sadhu Kokila	solo	
1995	Dore	"Raitha Raitha Raitha"	Hamsalekha	solo	
1995	Om	"Om Brahmananda Omkara" "O Gulabiye"	Hamsalekha	solo	
1995	Samara	"Kannadada Maathe Channa"	Kousthubha	solo	
1995	Sangeetha Sagara Ganayogi Panchakshara Gavai	"Saavirada Sharanu"	Hamsalekha	solo	
1995	Thayi Illada Thavaru	"Arishina Kumkuma"	Hamsalekha	solo	
1995	Gadibidi Aliya	"Kannadada Kuvaranu Naane"	Koti	Rajesh Krishnan	
1995	Karnataka Suputra	"Aa Vidhi Thandha"	M. M. Keeravani	solo	
1996	Aadithya	"Kavyavu Hosa Kavyavu"	Rajesh Ramanath	solo	
1996	Dhani	"Nee Kanda Aa Loka"	Sadhu Kokila	solo	
1996	Gajanura Gandu	"Yuga Yuga Sagihogi"	Sadhu Kokila	solo	
1996	Geluvina Saradara	"Topi Topi"	Hamsalekha	solo	
1996	Hetthavaru	"Makkalu Beku Anthare"	Hamsalekha	solo	
1996	Janumada Jodi	"Dehavendare O Manuja" "Janumada Jodi Aadaru"	V. Manohar	solo	
1996	Shreemathi Kalyana	"Ravi Illade"	Sadhu Kokila	solo	
1997	Janani Janmabhoomi	"Bayasuvudeno Aaguvudeno"	Rajan - Nagendra	solo	
1997	Ellaranthalla Nanna Ganda	"Janumava Neediruve"	Upendra Kumar	solo	
1997	Simhada Mari	"Manage Ondu Baagilu"	Hamsalekha	solo	
1997	Jodi Hakki	"Hara Hara Gange"	V. Manohar	solo	
1997	Baalida Mane	"Aa Vidhi Keralithe"	Rajan-Nagendra	solo	
1997	Raaja	"Shivane Shivane"	Deva	solo	
1998	Hoomale	"Hoomale Hoomale"	Ilaiyaraaja	solo	
1998	Baro Nanna Muddina Krishna	"Devrigeno Kopa"	Rajesh Ramanath	solo	
1998	Bhoomi Thayiya Chochchala Maga	"Bhoomithayiya"	V Manohar	solo	
1998	Kurubana Rani	"Thaali Thaali"	V Manohar	solo	
1998	Gadibidi Krishna	"Thamma Thamma"	Hamsalekha	solo	
1998	Swasthik	"Eddelu Huduga"	V. Manohar	solo	
1999	Janumadatha	"Aa Vidhathantha"	V. Manohar	solo	
1999	Idu Entha Premavayya	"Yeneno Kanasu"	Gurukiran	solo	
1999	Vishwa	"Vishwa Vishwa"	Hamsalekha	solo	
1999	Hrudaya Hrudaya	"O Premada Gangeye" "Hogi Baa"	Hamsalekha	K. S. Chithra	

=== 2000s ===
Year	Title	Song	Composer(s)	Co-singer(s)	Ref
2000	Shabdavedhi	"Thayyare Thayya" "Namma Yajamanru" "Prema Kashmira" "O Gelathi" "Janarinda Naanu Mele Bande"	Hamsalekha	K. S. Chithra; Manjula Gururaj	
2000	Hagalu Vesha	"Jaggadu Jaggadu"	Hamsalekha	solo	
2000	Devara Maga	"Manjanthe Ele Mele"	Hamsalekha	solo	
2000	Indradhanush	"Kelu Kelavva Kelavva" "Yara Kanasalla"	V. Manohar	solo	
2002	Appu	"Panavidu Panavidu" "Aa Devara Haadidu"	Gurukiran	solo	
2003	Abhi	"Vidhi Baraha"	Gurukiran	solo	
2003	Chigurida Kanasu	"Bandhuve O Bandhuve"	V. Manohar	solo	
2008	Vamshi	"Thayi Thayi"	Hamsalekha	solo	
2009	Raaj – The Showman	"O Kempa O Kaala"	V. Harikrishna	S. P. Balasubrahmanyam	
