= Jaanara Jaana =

- Directed by: B. Satyam
- Produced by: G. Krishna Murthy
- Starring: Raja Shankar; M. P. Shankar; Vanisri; Shylashri
- Cinematography: Sanjeevi
- Music by: G. K. Venkatesh
- Release date: 1967
- Country: India
- Language: Kannada

Jaanara Jaana is a 1967 Indian Kannada film, directed by B. Satyam and produced by G. Krishna Murthy. The film stars Raja Shankar, M. P. Shankar, Vanisri and Shylashri in the lead roles. The film has musical score by G. K. Venkatesh.

== Cast ==
- Raja Shankar
- M. P. Shankar
- Vanisri
- Shylashri
- R. Nagendra Rao
- Narasimharaju
