= Raja Shankar =

Indian film director

- Born: 18 August 1931; Madhugiri, Karnataka, India
- Died: 22 July 1987 (aged 55); Bangalore, Karnataka, India
- Other names: Rajashankar
- Occupation: Film actor
- Spouse: B.R. Shanthakumari
- Children: 5

Raja Shankar or Rajashankar was an Indian actor in Kannada cinema. His films include Bhakta Kumbara (1974), Sampathige Saval (1974) and Sri Srinivasa Kalyana (1974). He also co-produced the 1974 Kannada movie Bangaarada Panjara starring Dr. Rajkumar and the 1976 Kannada movie Vijaya Vani.

== Career ==
Shankar has appeared in more than 50 movies in Kannada.

== Personal life ==
His family lives in Malleswaram, Bangalore. There is a park and playground named after him at 1st Cross, Malleswaram, Bangalore. His youngest daughter, Chaya, contested the 17th Lok Sabha elections from Tumakuru representing the political party of the actor Upendra.

== Selected filmography ==
- Abba Aa Hudugi (1959)
- Kittur Chennamma (1961)
- Malli Maduve (1963)
- Saaku Magalu (1963)
- Kanyarathna (1963)
- Jenu Goodu (1963)
- Mangala Muhurta (1964)
- Manassiddare Marga (1967)
- Sri Purandara Dasaru (1967)
- Manassiddare Marga (1967)
- Broker Bheeshmachari (1969)
- Vaagdaana (1970)
- Hoo Bisilu (1971)
- Kasturi Nivasa (1971)
- Hoo Bisilu (1971)
- Signalman Siddappa (1971)
- Bangaarada Panjara (1974)
- Hemareddi Mallamma (1974)
- Sampathige Savaal (1974)
- Sri Srinivasa Kalyana (1974)
- Daari Tappida Maga (1975)
- Mayura (1975)
- Daari Tappida Maga (1975)
- Bahaddur Gandu (1976)
- Premada Kanike (1976)
- Aarada Gaaya (1980)

== See also ==
- List of people from Karnataka
- Cinema of Karnataka
- List of Indian film actors
- Cinema of India
