= Aduva Gombe =

2019 film by S. K. Bhagavan

- Poster
- Directed by: S. K. Bhagavan
- Screenplay by: S. K. Bhagavan
- Story by: S. K. Bhagavan
- Produced by: Shivappa A Venugopal K
- Starring: Sanchari Vijay; Ananth Nag; Sudha Belawadi
- Cinematography: Jabez K. Ganesh
- Edited by: Shivaprasad Yadav; Bharat Gowda
- Music by: Hemanth Kumar
- Production company: Kasthuri Nivasa Creations
- Release date: 4 January 2019
- Country: India
- Language: Kannada

Aduva Gombe (transl. Playing Doll) is a 2019 Indian Kannada-language drama film written and directed by S. K. Bhagavan of the famed duo Dorai–Bhagavan, who returns to film direction after 22 years. Produced under the banner of Kasthuri Nivasa Creations, the film is jointly funded by Shivappa A. and Venugopal K., Executive Producer: Satish S. The film stars Sanchari Vijay and Rishita Malnad. The supporting cast includes Ananth Nag and Sudha Belawadi among others. The film's score and soundtrack are composed by Hemanth Kumar and the cinematography is by Ganesh.

The film was released across Karnataka on 4 January 2019 and marked the first release for the year in Kannada cinema.

== Cast ==
- Sanchari Vijay as Madhava
- Ananth Nag as Kishan
- Rishita Malnad
- Sudha Belawadi as Rukmini
- Nirosha Shetty

== Soundtrack ==
Aduva Gombe

Soundtrack album by Hemanth Kumar
- Released: 26 October 2018
- Recorded: 2018
- Genre: Feature film soundtrack
- Label: PRK Audio
- Producers: Kasturinivasa Creations, A SHIVAPPA, K VENUGOPAL

Violinist Hemant Kumar scored the music for the film. The audio was released with much fanfare on 26 October 2018 and is owned by actor Puneeth Rajkumar's PRK Audio label. All three brother actors Shiva Rajkumar, Raghavendra Rajkumar, and Puneeth Rajkumar along with their cousin actor Vijay Raghavendra have lent their voices for the songs.

Track listing
No.	Title	Singer(s)	Length
1.	"Pisumaathige Thusu"	Shiva Rajkumar, Manasa Holla	6:11
2.	"Aa Dev Roopisida"	Puneeth Rajkumar	4:46
3.	"Adisi Nodu Beelisi Nodu"	Raghavendra Rajkumar	4:31
4.	"Madarangee Madarangee"	Vijay Raghavendra, Anuradha Bhat	6:24
5.	"O Madana"	Remo	4:52
6.	"Natyarani Shanthale"	Supriya Lohith	5:04

== Reception ==
=== Critical response ===
Sunayana Suresh of The Times of India scored the film at 2 out of 5 stars and says "If you are expecting some of the magic of the vintage Dorai-Bhagwan films, this might not really live up to the expectations. But if you want some soppy emotions and retro style filmmaking, you might like parts of it."Vijaya Karnataka scored the film at 2 out of 5 stars and says "Traveler Vijay has done well in emotional situations. Shivrajkumar, Puneeth, Raghavendra Rajkumar and Vijaya Raghavendra have sung for the first time in a single film. Those who like retro style cinema can watch cinema."
