= Ravanude Ramudayithe? =

Ravanude Ramudaithe ?
- Theatrical release poster
- Directed by: Dasari Narayana Rao
- Written by: Dasari Narayana Rao
- Produced by: N. R. Anuradha Devi
- Starring: Akkineni Nageswara Rao; Latha; Jayachitra
- Cinematography: K. S. Mani
- Edited by: K. Balu
- Music by: G. K. Venkatesh
- Production company: Lakshmi Film Combines
- Release date: 14 February 1979
- Running time: 144 mins
- Country: India
- Language: Telugu

Ravanude Ramudaithe? is a 1979 Telugu-language drama film, produced by N. R. Anuradha Devi for Lakshmi Film Combines and directed by Dasari Narayana Rao. It stars Akkineni Nageswara Rao, Latha and Jayachitra, with music composed by G. K. Venkatesh. The film recorded as a flop at the box office but it is remembered for its hit songs.

== Cast ==
- Akkineni Nageswara Rao as Naagulu / Nagaraju
- Latha as Rathalu
- Jayachitra as Taayaru
- Murali Mohan as Murali
- Mohan Babu as Poolaiah
- M. Prabhakar Reddy as Venkateswam
- Allu Ramalingaiah as English Manager
- Mukkamala as Lawyer
- Sowcar Janaki as Maha Lakshmi
- Jaya Malini as Jaya
- Thyagaraju as Thyagaraju
- K. V. Chalam as Chalamaiah
- Mada
- Chitti Babu
- Chidatala Appa Rao as Appa Rao

== Soundtrack ==
Ravanude Ramudaithe?

Film score by G. K. Venkatesh
- Released: 1979
- Genre: Soundtrack
- Length: 24:15
- Label: SEA Records
- Producer: G. K. Venkatesh

Music composed by G. K. Venkatesh. The film song "Ravivarmake Andani" is a blockbuster, which was borrowed from the Kannada song “Ravivarmana Kuchada” sung by singer P. B. Sreenivas and also composed by G.K. Venkatesh. The music released on SEA Records Audio Company.

S. No>	Song title	Lyrics	Singers	length
1	"Ravivarmake Andani"	Veturi	S. P. Balasubrahmanyam, S. Janaki	4:21
2	"Kanulalo Nee Roopam"	C. Narayana Reddy	S. P. Balasubrahmanyam, P. Susheela	4:17
3	"Aakalentho Dahamentho"	Veturi	P. Susheela	4:12
4	"Premante Telusa Neeku"	Acharya Aatreya	S. P. Balasubrahmanyam	4:06
5	"Usko Usko Pilla"	Veturi	S. P. Balasubrahmanyam, P. Susheela	3:34
6	"Uppu Chepa Pappu Charu"	Dasam Gopalakrishna	S. P. Balasubrahmanyam	3:45
