= Dorai–Bhagavan =

Indian filmmaking duo

- Occupation: Film directors
- Years active: 1961–2023

Dorai–Bhagavan were an Indian filmmaking duo consisting of directors B. Dorai Raj (died 2000) and S. K. Bhagavan (5 July 1933 – 20 February 2023), active mainly in Kannada cinema. The duo directed twenty seven films together, most of which starred Rajkumar and were highly successful at box-office. Fourteen of them were based on Kannada novels. Bhagavan was the principal of Adarsha Film Institute, Bangalore.

== Film career ==
Srinivasa Krishna Iyengar Bhagavan was born on 5 July 1933. He completed his schooling in Bangalore High school. At a young age, he was acting on stage dramas with Hirannaiah Mithra Mandali. He started his film career as an assistant to Kanagal Prabhakar Shastri in 1956 through the film Bhagyodaya. He then went on to direct his debut movie Sandhya Raga in 1966 though officially its direction was credited to A.C. Narasimha Murthy. However, next year, he was credited as the co-director of Rajadurgada Rahasya (1967) alongside A.C. Narasimha Murthy. His official directorial debut happened when he co-directed Jedara Bale (1968) with Dorai Raj under the name Dorai–Bhagavan thus becoming the first directors to make James Bond-style movies in Kannada.

The duo then directed films like Kasturi Nivasa, Eradu Kanasu, Bayalu Daari, Gaali Maathu, Chandanada Gombe, Hosa Belaku, Benkiya Bale, Jeevana Chaitra and more Bond-style movies such as Goa dalli C.I.D 999, Operation Jackpot Nalli C.I.D 999 and Operation Diamond Racket. Apart from Rajkumar, the duo directed many movies with Anant Nag and Lakshmi, most of which were based on novels. After the death of Dorai Raj, Bhagavan ceased directing for many years – their last film was Baalondu Chaduranga in 1996. In 2019, he made his comeback at the age of 85 with Aduva Gombe, which marks 50th film of his direction.

== Awards ==
Bhagavan was the principal of Adarsha Film Institute.

== Filmography ==
Dorai–Bhagavan directed a number of films. Apart from directing movies, Bhagavan also acted in films including Bhagyodaya, Rowdy Ranganna, Vasantha Geetha, Shravana Bantu, Sootradhaara, Haalu Jenu, Jeevana Chaithra and Bangalore Mail. He mostly worked with music director duo Rajan–Nagendra and G. K. Venkatesh for most of his films.

Note*: This is a partial filmography. You can expand it.

Key
†.	Denotes films that have not yet been released

Year	Film	Actors	Notes
1956	Bhagyodaya	Udaykumar	Assistant to Kanagal Prabhakar Shastri
1966	Sandhya Raga	Dr.Rajkumar, Bharati	Uncredited
1966	Mantralaya Mahatme	Dr.Rajkumar, Kalpana, Jayanthi	Production and direction department
1967	Rajadurgada Rahasya	Dr.Rajkumar, Bharati	Bhagavan only (co-director with A.C. Narasimha Murthy)
1968	Jedara Bale	Dr Rajkumar, Udaykumar	James Bond-style movie 1
1968	Goa Dalli CID 999	Dr Rajkumar, Lakshmi	James Bond-style movie 2 (debut of Lakshmi)
1969	Operation Jackpot Nalli C.I.D 999	Dr. Rajkumar, Rekha, Surekha	James Bond-style movie 3
1971	Kasturi Nivasa	Dr Rajkumar, Aarati, Jayanthi, Raja Shankar	
1971	Pratidwani	Dr Rajkumar, Rajesh, Aarati	
1974	Eradu Kanasu	Dr Rajkumar, Kalpana, Manjula	Novel by Vani
1976	Bayalu Daari	Anant Nag, Kalpana, Ashok, Jayalaxmi, Padma Kumta	Novel by Bharatisuta
1977	Giri Kanye	Dr Rajkumar, Jayamala	Novel by Bharatisuta
1978	Operation Diamond Racket	Dr Rajkumar, Padmapriya	James Bond-style movie 4
1979	Chandanada Gombe	Anant Nag, Lakshmi, Lokesh	Novel by Ta Ra Su
1979	Nanobba Kalla	Dr Rajkumar, Lakshmi, Kanchana	
1980	Vasantha Geetha	Dr Rajkumar, Gayatri, Puneet	
1981	Gaali Maathu	Lakshmi, Jai Jagadish, Kokila Mohan, Hema Chaudhry	Novel by Ta Ra Su
1981	Muniyana Madari	Shankar Nag, Jai Jagadish, Kokila Mohan, Jayamala	Novel by Ashwatha
1982	Hosa Belaku	Dr Rajkumar, Sarita, Mamata Rao, Srinivas Murthy	Novel by Vani
1983	Benkiya Bale	Anant Nag, Lakshmi	Novel by Ta Ra Su
1984	Samayada Gombe	Dr Rajkumar, Srinath, Roopadevi, Menaka, Kanchana	Novel by Chitralekha
1984	Yarivanu	Dr. Rajkumar, Srinath, Roopadevi, B. Saroja devi, Puneet, Hema Chaudhry	
1985	Bidugadeya Bedi	Anant Nag, Lakshmi	Novel by Ta Ra Su
1985	Sedina Hakki	Anant Nag, Lakshmi, Prabhakar, Rajeev, Jayamalini	Novel by T.K Rama Rao
1986	Hennina Koogu	Sarita, Sridhar	Novel by Geetha Nagabhushana (Hasi maamsa mattu haddugalu)
1987	Vijayothsava	Kumar Bangarappa, Sudharani, Kanchana	
1989	Gagana	Anant Nag, Srinath, Khushboo, Mahalakshmi, Vanita Vasu	Novel by N.Pankaja
1991	Neenu Nakkare Haalu Sakkare	Vishnuvardhan, Srinath, Rupini, Vinaya Prasad, Rajani, Chandrika, Anjali	Only movie with Vishnuvardhan
1992	Jeevana Chaitra	Dr Rajkumar, Madhavi, Sudharani	Novel by Vishalakshi Dakshinamurthy (Vyapti-Praapti)
1993	Mangalya Bandhana	Ananth Nag, Malashri, Moon Moon Sen	Bhagavan only
1994	Odahuttidavaru	Dr Rajkumar, Madhavi, Ambareesh, Srishanti, Umashree, Vajramuni	Last movie with Raj Kumar
1995	Baalondu Chaduranga	Lakshmi, Ramesh, Sai Kumar, Sudharani, S.P. Balasubramanyam, Srishanti	
2019	Aduva Gombe	Anant Nag, Sanchari Vijay	Bhagavan only
