= Gowri (1963 film) =

- Directed by: S. K. A. Chari
- Screenplay by: S. K. A. Chari
- Produced by: K. Narayan Rao
- Starring: Sowkar Janaki; Rajkumar; Sandhya
- Cinematography: Annayya
- Edited by: B. Harinarayanaiah
- Music by: G. K. Venkatesh
- Production company: Kalabharathi
- Distributed by: Kalabharathi
- Release date: 8 April 1963
- Running time: 150 minutes
- Country: India
- Language: Kannada

Gowri is a 1963 Indian Kannada-language film, directed by S. K. A. Chari and produced by K. Narayan Rao. The film stars Sowkar Janaki, Rajkumar, Dr. C.V. Subbarao ("Shashikanth"), and Sandhya. The film has a musical score by G. K. Venkatesh. This was the first Kannada movie to adapt already written Kannada poems into movie songs. The movie was remade from the 1952 Telugu movie Daasi with a few modifications in the plotline.

== Cast ==
- Sowkar Janaki as Gowri
- Rajkumar
- K. S. Ashwath
- Sandhya as Dhakshayini
- Rathna as Usha
- M. N. Lakshmi Devi
- Baby Suma
- Baby Latha
- Master Chandrashekar
- Master Francis

== Soundtrack ==
- "Ivalu Yaaru Balle Yenu" (Male Version) – P. B. Sreenivas
- "Yaava Janmada Maitri" – S. Janaki
- "Putta Putta Hejje" – S. Janaki, P. B. Sreenivas
- "Ivalu Yaaru Balle Yenu" (duet) – S. Janaki, P. B. Sreenivas
- "Naa Bedavende" – S. Janaki
- "Putta Putta Hejje" (female) – S. Janaki
