= Kaiwara Mahathme =

- Directed by: T. V. Singh Thakur
- Screenplay by: G. V. Iyer
- Produced by: Kaiwara Films (Pvt) Ltd.
- Starring: Rajkumar; Narasimharaju; Balakrishna; G. V. Iyer
- Cinematography: B. Dorairaj
- Edited by: Venkataram; Nazeer
- Music by: G. K. Venkatesh
- Production company: Kaiwara Films (Pvt) Ltd.
- Release date: 29 September 1961
- Country: India
- Language: Kannada

Kaiwara Mahathme is a 1961 Indian Kannada-language film, directed by T. V. Singh Thakur and produced by Kaiwara Films (Pvt) Ltd.. The film stars Rajkumar, Narasimharaju, Balakrishna and G. V. Iyer. The film has musical score by G. K. Venkatesh.

== Cast ==
- Rajkumar
- Narasimharaju
- Balakrishna
- G. V. Iyer
- K. S. Ashwath
- H. R. Shastry
- Bharadwaj
- Girimaji
- Krishna Shastry
- Kuppuraj
- M. Bhagavathar
- Srikanth
- Basappa
- Ramaraja Urs
- Suresh
- Leelavathi
- M. Jayashree
- Papamma
- Shanthamma
- Jayalakshmi
- Padmamma
- Indrani
- Kumari Jaya
- Kumari
- Revathi
- Vijayakumari
- Shakunthala
