= G. K. Venkatesh =

Indian music composer

Background information
- Born: 21 September 1927
- Origin: Hyderabad, Hyderabad State, British India (now in Telangana, India)
- Died: 17 November 1993 (aged 66) Madras (now Chennai), Tamil Nadu, India
- Occupations: Film score, music director, playback singer, actor, film producer
- Instrument: Veena
- Years active: 1946 to 1993

Gurusala Krishnadas Venkatesh (21 September 1927 – 17 November 1993) was an Indian film score composer who primarily worked in Kannada cinema from the 1960s until the late 1980s. He also composed music for Telugu, Malayalam and Tamil films. He created numerous masterpieces of Kannada film music and also brought in Western background score into Kannada films and scored music for all Bond movies of Rajkumar in the 1960s and the 1970s. He was fondly given the title Sangeetha Saarvabhouma meaning "Emperor of Music".

== Early life ==
Born in a Telugu Balija naidu family, Venkatesh began to learn music very young and was talented. Even as a child, he was appreciated by Ramakrishna Ranga Rao of Bobbili. He learned veena from his elder brother G. K. S. Pathi. As a teenager, he played Veena for the great music directors such as S. V. Venkatraman, S. M. Subbaiah Naidu and C. R. Subbaraman.

GKV was also a talented singer. Before entering to cinema, he was singing in the Bangalore All India Radio. He had done chorus under S. V. Venkatraman for Meera.

== Career ==
He became a close friend to M. S. Viswanathan (MSV) while working under S. M. Subbaiah Naidu during the late-1940s. They shared the same room in Jupiter Lodge, Madras when MSV was offered to compose some songs for Genoa. When N. S. Krishnan offered an opportunity to M. S. Viswanathan and T. K. Ramamoorthy to compose music for Panam (1952) for Madras Pictures, GKV became a part of their troupe. He had a chance to sing Ezhayin Kovilai Naadinaen in Panam which was also Sivaji Ganesan's second film. He was named as their assistant by Viswanathan–Ramamoorthy.

In 1952, he composed music independently for a Malayalam film, which was also dubbed in Tamil as Nadigai. In 1955, he started to compose music for a Kannada film named Sodari starring Dr. Rajkumar (his second film) and Pandaribai along with H. R. Padmanabha Shastry. Since then he became a much sought after and one of the successful music directors in Kannada films along with T. G. Lingappa and Vijaya Bhaskar. He was showered with offers where he composed music from Ohileshwara (1956) until Kalitharu Henne (1963) in a row. GKV launched P. B. Sreenivas as a successful singer in Kannada films.

He came back to Tamil films in 1964 for Thirumagal Films movie Magale Un Samathu. Since then he began to compose music for both Kannada and Tamil films.

In the late-1960s, it is notable that Ilaiyaraja and L. Vaidyanathan were playing instruments under GKV's troupe, assisting to compose music.

== Work with Rajkumar ==
GKV composed music for 51 films in which Dr. Rajkumar played the lead role. He launched Dr. Rajkumar as a singer in the film Ohileshwara (song: Sharanu Shambho) and also recorded Dr. Rajkumar's first duet in Mahishasura Mardhini (song: Tumbitu Manava with S. Janaki). GKV would insist Dr. Rajkumar to sing regularly, owing to his grooming in the Gubbi Company. Rajkumar, however preferred P. B. Sreenivas, to sing for him.

In 1974, P. B. Sreenivas was unwell on the day of recording of song "Yare Koogadali" in the movie Sampathige Saval.GKV proposed Rajkumar to sing the song and Rajkumar reluctantly recorded the song. Once PBS came back, they wanted to re-record the song, but PBS, being generous minded, suggested they keep the song as-is, because Rajkumar had done a phenomenal job.Thus it marked the re-emergence of the singer in Rajkumar.

A versatile music director, GKV used elaborate Western-style orchestration in his songs, be they of any genre. He successfully brought Master singer Dr. Bhimsen Joshi to sing for films Sandhya Raga (1966). Bhimsen Joshi sang again in the movie Nodi Swamy Navirodu Hige (1983).

Ustad Bismillah Khan was reluctant to play Shehnai for films during his later part of years. GKV got the Maestro to play Shehnai for lead character Appanna, enacted by Dr. Rajkumar in Sanaadi Appanna (1977). The songs became chartbusters and are aired regularly on the Kannada Radio.

== Style of composing ==
GKV brought in the western background score first into Kannada cinema, His re-recording played a role in each and every movie he did, with his use of instruments in his songs and background scores.

== Personal life ==
His brother, G. K. Raghu, was also a music composer who composed music for the Rajkumar-starrer Bangaarada Panjara. His granddaughter, Vani Harikrishna, is a playback singer.

== Works with Ilaiyaraaja ==
Ilaiyaraaja was hired as an assistant by GKV, an event that marked the entry of Ilaiyaraaja into film music composition and direction. Ilaiyaraaja assisted GKV in 200 Kannada film projects. Later Ilaiyaraaja went on to become one of the most prominent film music composers in India.

== Acting & Singing ==
GKV had a small part to play in AVM Productions's Mella Thirandhathu Kadhavu in 1986 in which he acted in the role of Mohan's musician father. His dialogues were dubbed by V. Gopalakrishnan. The music directors were M. S. Viswanathan and Ilaiyaraja.

He had appeared on-screen in the Kannada movie Kanteredu Nodu in 1961 in the song Kannadada Makkalella Ondagi Banni, composed and sung by himself.

He occasionally also sang songs in Kannada movies for which he had composed music such as - Ohileshwara (1956), Kantheredu Nodu (1961), Malli Maduve (1963) and Kasturi Nivasa (1971)

== Film producer ==
During the fledgling days of Kannada film movement, he produced movies such as Ranadheera Kantheerava (1960), Immadi Pulikeshi (1968) in partnership with other artists. In 1987, he produced the Ramarajan and Revathi starrer Gramathu Minnal Tamil film.

== Works ==
Prominent compositions of G. K. Venkatesh in Kannada include:

- "Kannadati taaye baa" from Sandhya Raga by Bhimsen Joshi
- "Nambide ninna naadadevateye" from Sandhya Raga sung in three different versions (Hindustani and Carnatic) by Bhimsen Joshi, M. Balamuralikrishna and S. Janaki respectively.
- "Aadisi nodu, beelisi nodu" from Kasturi Nivasa by P. B. Sreenivas.
- "Aadisidaata besara moodi" from Kasturi Nivasa by G. K. Venkatesh himself.
- "Nee Bandu Nintaga" from Kasturi Nivasa by P. B. Sreenivas and P. Susheela.
- "Nagu Naguta Nali" and "Aagadu Endu" from Bangaarada Manushya by P. B. Sreenivas
- "Baala Bangaara Neenu" from Bangaarada Manushya by P. Susheela
- "Aaha Mysuru Mallige" from Bangaarada Manushya by P. B. Sreenivas and P. Susheela
- "Preetine Aa Dyavaru Thanda" from Doorada Betta by P. B. Sreenivas & P. Susheela
- "Malenaada Henna" from Bhootayyana Maga Ayyu by P. B. Sreenivas and S. Janaki
- "Yaare Koogadali" from Sampathige Savaal by Dr. Rajkumar
- "Anthinta Hennu" from Sampathige Savaal by S. Janaki
- "Naguvudo Aluvudo" from Sampathige Savaal by P. B. Sreenivas
- "Manava Dehavu Moole Mamsada Thadike" and "Elli Mareyaade" from Bhakta Kumbara by P. B. Sreenivas
- "Naaniruvude Nimagaagi" from Mayura by Dr. Rajkumar
- "Ee Mounava Taalenu" from Mayura by Dr. Rajkumar and S. Janaki
- "Le Le Appana Magale" and "Moogana Kaadidarenu" from Thrimurthy by Dr. Rajkumar
- "Kannadada makkalella ondaagi banni" from Kantheredu Nodu by himself
- "Ravivarmana Kunchada Kale" from Sose Tanda Soubhagya by P. B. Sreenivas and S. Janaki
- "Kannanchina Ee Mathali" from Daari Tappida Maga by P. B. Sreenivas
- "Naariya seere kadda, radheya manava gedda.." from Daari Tappida Maga by Dr. Rajkumar
- "Ninade nenapu dinavu manadalli.." from Raja Nanna Raja by P. B. Sreenivas
- "Thanuvu Manavu" from Raja Nanna Raja by Dr. Rajkumar and S. Janaki
- "Nooru Kannu Saladu" from Raja Nanna Raja by P. B. Sreenivas and S. P. Balasubrahmanyam
- "Karedaroo kelade" and "Ninagaagi ododi bande" from Sanaadi Appanna by S. Janaki and Dr. Rajkumar with Bismillah Khan on the Shehanai.
- "Nannedhe Kogileya" from Olavu Geluvu by S. Janaki
- "Sangeethave Nee Nudiyuva" from Olavu Geluvu by Dr. Rajkumar and S. Janaki
- "If You Come Today" from "Operation Diamond Racket" by Dr. Rajkumar
- "Alli Illi Noduve" from "Operation Diamond Racket" by Dr. Rajkumar and S. Janaki
- "Chinnada Mallige Hoove" from Huliya Haalina Mevu by Dr. Rajkumar and S. Janaki
- "Aase Heluvaase" from Huliya Haalina Mevu by Dr. Rajkumar, P. Susheela and S. Janaki
- "Naanu Yaaru Yaava Ooru" from Antha by S. P. Balasubrahmanyam
- "Bisi Bisi Kajjaya" and "Hoovinda Bareda Katheya" from Havina Hede by Dr. Rajkumar
- Muthiah Bhagavatar's Kannada composition in the raaga Mohanakalyani "Bhuvaneshwariya nene maanasave" and "Sukhada Swapna Gaana" from Mareyada Haadu by S. Janaki.
- "Haalu Jenu Ondada Haage" and "Baalu belakaayitu.." from Haalu Jenu by Dr. Rajkumar
- "Nodi Swamy Naavirodu Heege" from Nodi Swamy Navirodu Hige by S. P. Balasubrahmanyam
- "Bhagyada lakshmi baaramma" from Nodi Swamy Navirodu Hige by Bhimsen Joshi
- "Eke Malli Hange" from Eradu Nakshatragalu by Dr. Rajkumar and Vani Jairam
- "Gelati Baaradu Intha Samaya" from Eradu Nakshatragalu by Dr. Rajkumar
- "Nanna Udupu Ninnadu" from Eradu Nakshatragalu by Master Lohith
- "Ade Kannu" from Ade Kannu by Dr. Rajkumar
- "Ide Nota Ide Aata" from Ade Kannu by Dr. Rajkumar and Vani Jairam

Some compositions of G. K. Venkatesh in Tamil, include:

- "Unga Manasu Oru Dhinusu" from Magale Un Samathu by K. Jamuna Rani
- "Vaa Vaa Vaa En Thalaiva" from Naanum Manithan Thaan by T. A. Mothi & S. Janaki
- "Kaatru Varum Kaalamondru" from Naanum Manithan Thaan by P. B. Sreenivas & S. Janaki
- "Poonthendral Isaipaada" from Thaayin Karunai by P. B. Sreenivas
- "Netru Nadanthathu" from Thaayin Karunai by A. L. Ragavan & S. Janaki
- "Thoduvathenna Thendralo Malargalo" from Sabatham by S. P. Balasubrahmanyam
- "Then Sindhudhe Vaanam"from Ponukku Thanga Manasu by S. P. Balasubrahmanyam & S. Janaki
- "Naan Paartha Rathidevi Enge" from Kannil Theriyum Kathaigal by A. L. Raghavan
- "Maasi Maadham Muhurtha Neram Medai Mangalam" from Pennin Vaazhkkai by Jayachandran & P. Susheela
- "Azhagiya Sennira Vaanam" from Kashmir Kadhali by S. P. Balasubrahmanyam & S. Janaki
- "Azhagiya Malarkkodi Pazhagiya Manikkili" from Inaindha Kodugal by K. J. Yesudas & Vani Jairam

Some compositions of G. K. Venkatesh in Telugu include:

- "Paadana Tenugu Paata Ne Paravasamai Mee Eduta Ee Paata" from America Ammayi by P. Susheela
- "Raasanu Premalekhalenno Daachanu Aashalenno Neelo" from Sridevi by S. P. Balasubrahmanyam & S. Janaki
- "Ravi Varmake Andani Oke Oka Andanivo" from Ravanude Ramudaite by S. P. Balasubrahmanyam

== Filmography ==
=== Music direction ===
| Year | Film | Language | Director | Banner | Notes |
|---|---|---|---|---|---|
| 1950 | Chechi | Malayalam | T. Janaki Ram | | |
| 1951 | Nadigai | Tamil | T. Janaki Ram | | |
| 1955 | Sodari | Kannada | T. V. Singh Thakur | Viswakala Chitra | with H. R. Padmanabha Shastry |
| 1956 | Hari Bhakta | Kannada | T. V. Singh Thakur | Viswakala Chitra | |
| 1956 | Ohileshwara | Kannada | T. V. Singh Thakur | Viswakala Chitra | |
| 1958 | Anna Thangi | Kannada | K. R. Seetharama Sastry | Girija Productions | |
| 1959 | Dharma Vijaya | Kannada | N. Jaganath | H. M. Baba Production | |
| 1959 | Jagajyothi Basveshwara | Kannada | T. V. Singh Thakur | Shashikala Chitra | |
| 1959 | Mahishasura Mardini | Kannada | B. S. Ranga | Vikram Productions | |
| 1959 | Mahishasura Mardini | Telugu | B. S. Ranga | Vikram Productions | |
| 1960 | Dashavathara | Kannada | P. G. Mohan | Vikram Productions | |
| 1960 | Ranadheera Kanteerava | Kannada | N. C. Rajan | Kannada Chalanachitra Kalavidara Sangha | |
| 1960 | Sanchari | Telugu | N. C. Rajan | Kannada Chalanachitra Kalavidara Sangha | |
| 1961 | Arappavan | Malayalam | K. Shankar | Seva Films | with P. S. Diwakar |
| 1961 | Kaiwara Mahathme | Kannada | T. V. Singh Thakur | Kaiwara Films (Pvt) Ltd | |
| 1961 | Kantheredu Nodu | Kannada | T. V. Singh Thakur | Arunachelam Studios | |
| 1962 | Bhoodana | Kannada | P. S. Gopalakrishna & G. V. Iyer | Ananthlakshmi Pictures | |
| 1962 | Karuneye Kutumbada Kannu | Kannada | T. V. Singh Thakur | Shilashree Productions | |
| 1962 | Prayaschittam | Telugu | A. Bhimsingh | Saravana Films | with Viswanathan–Ramamoorthy |
| 1962 | Thayi Karulu | Kannada | G. V. Iyer | | |
| 1963 | Ananda Bashpa | Kannada | R. Nagendra Rao | R. Nagendra Rao | |
| 1963 | Bangari | Kannada | G. V. Iyer | G. V. Iyer | |
| 1963 | Gowri | Kannada | S. K. A. Chari | Kalabharathi | |
| 1963 | Kalitharu Henne | Kannada | N. C. Rajan | Jaya Balakrishna | |
| 1963 | Kanyarathna | Kannada | J. D. Thotan | DBN Productions | |
| 1963 | Kulavadhu | Kannada | T. V. Singh Thakur | Shilashree Productions | |
| 1963 | Lawyer Magalu | Kannada | G. V. Iyer | G. V. Iyer | |
| 1963 | Malli Maduve | Kannada | G. R. Nathan | Jupiter Pictures Ltd | |
| 1963 | Vijayanagara Veeraputhruni Katha | Telugu | R. Nagendra Rao | RNR Pictures | with Viswanathan–Ramamoorthy |
| 1964 | Naanum Manithan Thaan | Tamil | A. Sheshagiri Rao | Anandan Movies | |
| 1964 | Kalaavati | Kannada | T. V. Singh Thakur | Krishnodya Chithra | |
| 1964 | Kavaleradu Kulavandu | Kannada | T. V. Singh Thakur | Shilashree Productions | |
| 1964 | Magale Un Samathu | Tamil | D. S. Rajagopal | Thirumagal Films | |
| 1964 | Thumbida Koda | Kannada | N. C. Rajan | Sri Venkatesh Chithra | |
| 1965 | Thayin Karunai | Tamil | G. V. Iyer | | |
| 1965 | Nanna Kartavya | Kannada | Vedantam Raghavayya | Movie Makers | |
| 1965 | Sarvagna Murthy | Kannada | Aruru Pattabhi | M. Narendra Babu | |
| 1965 | Sathi Savithri | Kannada | P. R. Kaundanya | K V M Pictures | |
| 1966 | Kiladi Ranga | Kannada | G. V. Iyer | Vasantha Pictures | |
| 1966 | Madhu Malathi | Kannada | S. K. A. Chari | Trimurthy Films | |
| 1966 | Sandhya Raga | Kannada | A. C. Narasimha Murthy & S. K. Bhagavan | Shailashree Productions | |
| 1967 | Dhana Pishachi | Kannada | S. N. Singh | Mohini Productions | |
| 1967 | Immadi Pulikeshi | Kannada | N. C. Rajan | Sri Venkatesh Chitra | |
| 1967 | Jaanara Jaana | Kannada | B. Satyam | G. Krishna Murthy | |
| 1967 | Muddu Meena | Kannada | Y. R. Swamy | S. Heerabai | with Upendra Kumar |
| 1967 | Parvathi Kalyana | Kannada | B. S. Ranga | Vikram Productions | |
| 1967 | Rajadurgada Rahasya | Kannada | A. C. Narasimha Murthy & S. K. Bhagavan | Krishnodaya Chithra | |
| 1967 | Rajashekara | Kannada | G. V. Iyer | Vasanth Pictures | |
| 1968 | Attagaru Kotha Kodalu | Telugu | Akkineni Sanjeevi | Kalpanachitra | |
| 1968 | Dial 2244 | Malayalam | R. M. Krishnaswamy | | |
| 1968 | Jedara Bale | Kannada | Dorai–Bhagavan | Manthralaya Movies | |
| 1968 | Manassakshi | Kannada | S. K. A. Chari | ALS Productions | |
| 1968 | Goa Dalli CID 999 | Kannada | Dorai–Bhagavan | Anupam Movies | |
| 1969 | Bhageerathi | Kannada | T. V. Singh Thakur | | |
| 1969 | Kannamucchale | Kannada | M. R. Vittal | | |
| 1969 | Operation Jackpot Nalli C.I.D 999 | Kannada | Dorai–Bhagavan | Golden Studio | |
| 1969 | Natakala Rayudu | Telugu | Akkineni Sanjeevi | Harihara Films | |
| 1969 | Ratha Paei | Tamil | Mooban | Golden Studio | Malaysian Film |
| 1970 | Devara Makkalu | Kannada | Y. R. Swamy | Bharath Enterprises | |
| 1970 | Goa CID 999 | Telugu | Dorai–Bhagavan | Anupam Movies | with T. V. Raju |
| 1970 | Jackpotlo Gudachari | Telugu | Dorai–Bhagavan | Golden Studio | |
| 1970 | Kiladi C I D 999 | Telugu | Dorai–Bhagavan | Manthralaya Movies | |
| 1970 | Sridevi | Telugu | | | |
| 1971 | Baala Bandana | Kannada | Peketi Sivaram | ALS Productions | |
| 1971 | Kasturi Nivasa | Kannada | Dorai–Bhagavan | Anupam Movies | |
| 1971 | Maa Ilavelpu | Telugu | G. V. R. Seshagiri Rao | Kamakshi Agencies | |
| 1971 | Naguva Hoovu | Kannada | R. N. K. Prasad | Sri Sudarshan Chitralaya | |
| 1971 | Pratidwani | Kannada | Dorai–Bhagavan | Vikram Studios & Sharada Studios | |
| 1971 | Sabatham | Tamil | P. Madhavan | Devanayaki Films | |
| 1971 | Tande Makkalu | Kannada | Srikanth | | |
| 1971 | Thayi Devaru | Kannada | S. Siddalingaiah | Jain Movies | |
| 1972 | Bangaarada Manushya | Kannada | S. Siddalingaiah | Kanteerava Studios | |
| 1972 | Kodalupilla | Telugu | M. Mallikarjuna Rao | Jai Shankar and Company | |
| 1972 | Somaripotu | Telugu | V. Ramachandra Rao | Sri Kalpana Chitra | |
| 1973 | Devi Lalithamba | Telugu | | | |
| 1973 | Doorada Betta | Kannada | S. Siddalingaiah | KCN Movies | |
| 1973 | Pasi Hrudayalu | Telugu | M. Mallikarjuna Rao | Navachitra Productions | |
| 1973 | Ponnukku Thanga Manasu | Tamil | Devaraj–Mohan | Arun Prasad Movies | |
| 1973 | Srivaru Maavaru | Telugu | B. S. Narayana | Mahavishnu Productions | |
| 1973 | Tallikodukulu | Telugu | P. Chandrasekhara Reddy | Gauri Shankar Pictures | |
| 1974 | Anna Attige | Kannada | M. R. Vittal | M R Sri Productions | |
| 1974 | Bhakta Kumbara | Kannada | Hunsur Krishnamurthy | Lakshmi Film Combines | Won – Karnataka State Film Award for Best Music Director |
| 1974 | Bhootayyana Maga Ayyu | Kannada | S. Siddalingaiah | Jain Combines | |
| 1974 | Murugan Kaattiya Vazhi | Tamil | P. Madhavan | Arun Prasad Movies | |
| 1974 | Sampathige Savaal | Kannada | A. V. Seshagiri Rao | Padmashree Enterprises | |
| 1975 | Daari Tappida Maga | Kannada | Peketi Sivaram | Jayaprabha Productions | |
| 1975 | Koodi Balona | Kannada | M. R. Vittal | | |
| 1975 | Mayura | Kannada | Vijay | Ramesh Movies | |
| 1975 | Mayura | Hindi | Vijay | Ramesh Movies | |
| 1975 | Nireekshe | Kannada | Kovi Manisekharan | | |
| 1975 | Piriya Vidai | Tamil | Srikanth | Prasad Productions | |
| 1975 | Thennangkeetru | Tamil | K. V. Manisekaran | Goodwin Enterprises | |
| 1975 | Thrimurthy | Kannada | C. V. Rajendran | Poornima Enterprises | |
| 1975 | Yarukkum Vetkam Illai | Tamil | Cho Ramaswamy | Narmada Arts | |
| 1975 | Zamindarugari Ammayi | Telugu | Singeetam Srinivasa Rao | | |
| 1976 | Aadavallu Apanindhalu | Telugu | B. S. Narayana | Subha Chitralaya | |
| 1976 | America Ammayi | Telugu | Singeetam Srinivasa Rao | Navata Arts | |
| 1976 | Baalu Jenu | Kannada | Kunigal Nagabhushan | S G S Films | |
| 1976 | Bangarada Gudi | Kannada | K. S. R. Das | Venus Mahija Pictures | |
| 1976 | Raja Nanna Raja | Kannada | A. V. Seshagiri Rao | Madhu Art Films | |
| 1977 | Chakradhari | Telugu | V. Madhusudhana Rao | Lakshmi Films Combines | |
| 1977 | Galate Samsara | Kannada | C. V. Rajendran | C. Jayaram | |
| 1977 | Kartavyada Kare | Kannada | Sunand | Kismath Movies | |
| 1977 | Olavu Geluvu | Kannada | H. R. Bhargava | Seenu Creations | |
| 1977 | Sanaadi Appanna | Kannada | Vijay | Anandalakshmi Enterprises | |
| 1977 | Shrimanthana Magalu | Kannada | A. V. Seshagiri Rao | | |
| 1977 | Sose Tanda Soubhagya | Kannada | A. V. Seshagiri Rao | Bhuvaneshwari Arts Productions | |
| 1977 | Tharam Marindi | Telugu | Singeetam Srinivasa Rao | Vishwabharati Movies | |
| 1978 | Bhale Huduga | Kannada | T. R. Ramanna | Royal Pictures | |
| 1978 | Devadaasi | Kannada | C. V. Raju | Raj Enterprises | |
| 1978 | Kaamam Kaatesindi | Telugu | | V. M. Pictures | with Purnachandra Rao |
| 1978 | Operation Diamond Racket | Kannada | Dorai–Bhagavan | Anupam Movies | |
| 1978 | Vamsha Jyothi | Kannada | A. Bhimsingh | | |
| 1978 | Chithegu Chinthe | Kannada | M. S. Sathyu | Savan Movies | Background Score only with L. Vaidyanathan |
| 1979 | Malligai Mohini | Tamil | Durai | Pallavi Enterprises | |
| 1979 | Asadhya Aliya | Kannada | H. R. Bhargava | Chandrika Films | |
| 1979 | Huliya Haalina Mevu | Kannada | Vijay | Rajkamal Arts | |
| 1979 | Kamala | Kannada | C. V. Rajendran | N V R Pictures | |
| 1979 | Mutthu Ondu Mutthu | Kannada | R. N. Jayagopal | Bhagya Kalamandir | |
| 1979 | Nentaro Gantu Kallaro | Kannada | A. V. Seshagiri Rao | Savan Movies | |
| 1979 | Ravanude Ramudayithe? | Telugu | Dasari Narayana Rao | Lakshmi Film Combines | |
| 1980 | Chinnajiru Kiliye | Tamil | K. Chandra Bose | Sunrise Enterprises | |
| 1980 | Dhairya Lakshmi | Kannada | Chitralaya Gopu | Vijayavani Combines | |
| 1980 | Jathara | Telugu | Dhavala Satyam | Soumya Cine Arts | |
| 1980 | Kannil Theriyum Kathaikal | Tamil | Devaraj–Mohan | Raja Meenakshi Films | (with K. V. Mahadevan, Agathiyar<ref, Ilaiyaraja & Shankar–Ganesh) |
| 1980 | Navvutu Bratakali | Telugu | P. Chandrasekhara Reddy | Narendra Productions | |
| 1980 | O Inti Bhagotham | Telugu | Devadas Kanakala | Navata Arts | |
| 1980 | Rakta Bandham | Telugu | Aluri Ravi | Ricoh Films | |
| 1980 | Rusthum Jodi | Kannada | K. Vijayan | N V R Productions | |
| 1980 | Sannayi Appanna | Telugu | Lakshmi Deepak | Sri Ramana Chitra | |
| 1980 | Usha Swayamvara | Kannada | C. V. Rajendran | Bhoomi Chithra | |
| 1981 | Antha | Kannada | Rajendra Singh Babu | Parimala Arts | |
| 1981 | Bhoomige Banda Bhagavantha | Kannada | K. S. L. Swamy | Jain Movies | |
| 1981 | Deiva Thirumanangal | Tamil | K. Shankar, P. Neelakantan & Kamalakara Kameswara Rao | Solar Combines | with K. V. Mahadevan & M. S. Viswanathan |
| 1981 | Devathala Kalyanamu | Telugu | K. Shankar, P. Neelakantan & Kamalakara Kameswara Rao | Solar Combines | with K. V. Mahadevan & M. S. Viswanathan |
| 1981 | Hanabalavo Janabalavo | Kannada | Vijay | Vishwamatha Productions | |
| 1981 | Havina Hede | Kannada | V. Somashekhar | Poornima Enterprises | |
| 1981 | Mareyada Haadu | Kannada | R. N. Jayagopal | K V S Movies | |
| 1981 | Nenjil Oru Mull | Tamil | Mathi Oli Shanmugam | Santosh Art Films | |
| 1981 | Pennin Vaazhkkai | Tamil | K. Vijayan | Annapoorna Art Pictures | |
| 1982 | Nepal Gudachari 999 | Telugu | Dorai–Bhagavan | Anupam Movies | |
| 1982 | Bhakta Gnanadeva | Kannada | Hunsur Krishnamurthy | Rajkamal Arts | |
| 1982 | Haalu Jenu | Kannada | Singeetam Srinivasa Rao | Poornima Enterprises | |
| 1982 | Karmika Kallanalla | Kannada | K. S. R. Das | Madhu Art Films | |
| 1982 | Bhakta Gnanadeva | Telugu | Hunsur Krishnamurthy | Rajkamal Arts | |
| 1982 | Inspector Jagan | Telugu | | | |
| 1982 | Maro Malupu | Telugu | V. Satyanarayana | Ruby Movies | |
| 1982 | Shankar Sundar | Kannada | A. T. Raghu | Varuna Films | |
| 1982 | Taghubothu Thirugubothu | Telugu | Thota Ramamohana Rao | Natesh Films | |
| 1983 | Aasha | Kannada | A. T. Raghu | Varuna Productions | |
| 1983 | Digivachina Devudu | Telugu | Ravi | | with Lakshmi Kiran |
| 1983 | Eradu Nakshatragalu | Kannada | Singeetam Srinivasa Rao | Kamakshi Cine Enterprises | |
| 1983 | Hosa Theerpu | Kannada | Shankar Nag | NVR Pictures | |
| 1983 | Kashmir Kadhali | Tamil | Mathi Oli Shanmugam | Chithra Priya Cine Arts | |
| 1983 | Nodi Swamy Navirodu Hige | Kannada | Shankar Nag | Gayathri Chithralaya | |
| 1983 | Urumulu Merupulu | Telugu | K. S. Satyanarayana | | with A. A. Raj |
| 1984 | Azhagu | Tamil | K. Vijayan | Seshasayee Films | |
| 1984 | Gajendra | Kannada | V. Somashekar | Gajaraja Pictures | |
| 1984 | Guru Bhakti | Kannada | K. N. Chandrashekar Sharma | Varuna Art Productions | |
| 1984 | Jiddu | Kannada | D. Rajendra Babu | A N S Productions | |
| 1984 | Kaliyuga | Kannada | Raja Chandra | Singh Brothers | |
| 1984 | Makkaliralavva Mane Thumba | Kannada | T. S. Nagabharana | Durga Dattha Enterprises | |
| 1984 | Male Banthu Male | Kannada | P. S. Prakash | Mani Padma Films | |
| 1984 | Manthrikudu Siva Bhakthudu | Telugu | | | |
| 1984 | Rakasi Nagu | Telugu | D. Rajendrababu | | |
| 1985 | Ade Kannu | Kannada | Chi. Dattaraj | Hayavadana Movies | |
| 1985 | Chaduranga | Kannada | V. Somashekhar | Premalaya Pictures | |
| 1985 | Guru Jagadguru | Kannada | A. T. Raghu | Varuna Art Productions | |
| 1985 | Inaintha Kodugal | Tamil | P. S. Prakash | Prasanna Creations | |
| 1985 | Parameshi Prema Prasanga | Kannada | Ramesh Bhat | Gayathri Chithralaya | |
| 1985 | Shabash Vikram | Kannada | Renuka Sharma | | |
| 1986 | Hosa Neeru | Kannada | K. V. Jayaram | Panchama Movie Makers | Won – Karnataka State Film Award for Best Music Director |
| 1986 | Preethi | Kannada | A. T. Raghu | Shakthi Productions | |
| 1987 | Jaganmatha | Telugu | | | |
| 1987 | Poornachandra | Kannada | C. V. Rajendran | Raj Enterprises | |
| 1987 | Yaarigagi | Kannada | Pradeep Kumar | Sohania Movies | |
| 1989 | Chattaniki Kallunte | Telugu | A. T. Raghu | | with A. A. Raj |
| 1989 | Gandandre Gandu | Kannada | V. Somashekhar | Sri Prasanna Lakshmi Combines | |

=== Playback singer ===
| Year | Film | Language | Song | Music | Co-singer |
|---|---|---|---|---|---|
| 1950 | Chechi | Malayalam | Varika Varika Sahachare | G. K. Venkatesh | Kaviyoor Revamma |
| 1952 | Panam | Tamil | Ezhayin Kovilai Naadinaen | Viswanathan–Ramamoorthy | M. L. Vasanthakumari |
| 1953 | Jatagam | Tamil | Aandavan Namakku | R. Govardhanam | A. G. Rathnamala |
| 1954 | Vaira Malai | Tamil | Nadana Kalaa Raani | Viswanathan–Ramamoorthy | P. Leela & A. P. Komala |
| 1955 | Gulebakavali | Tamil | Villenthum Veerannellam | Viswanathan–Ramamoorthy | Thiruchi Loganathan & P. Leela |
| 1955 | Santhosham | Telugu | Teeyani Eenati Reyi | Viswanathan–Ramamoorthy | P. Susheela |
| 1955 | Santhosham | Telugu | Nilupara | Viswanathan–Ramamoorthy | |
| 1956 | Ohileshwara | Kannada | Om Namaha Shivaya | G. K. Venkatesh | |
| 1959 | Mangaiyin Sabatham | Tamil | Nee Yaro Aval Yaro | Viswanathan–Ramamoorthy | |
| 1959 | Raja Malaiya Simman | Tamil | Maaligaiyilae Vasikkum | Viswanathan–Ramamoorthy | Seerkazhi Govindarajan & P. B. Sreenivas |
| 1959 | Raja Malaya Simha | Telugu | Oranna Mosappukaalam | Viswanathan–Ramamoorthy | Madhavapeddi Satyam & P. B. Sreenivas |
| 1960 | Kavalai Illaadha Manithan | Tamil | Kannodu Vin Pesum Jaadai | Viswanathan–Ramamoorthy | K. Jamuna Rani, T. S. Bagavathi & A. L. Raghavan |
| 1961 | Amulya Kanuka | Telugu | Ela Marachao Isha | C. N. Pandurangan | |
| 1961 | Kantheredu Nodu | Kannada | Kannadada Makkalella | G. K. Venkatesh | |
| 1961 | Pava Mannippu | Tamil | Nilai Maarinaal Gunam Maaruvaan | Viswanathan–Ramamoorthy | |
| 1962 | Prajasakthi | Telugu | Paduchupilla Valachenayya | Viswanathan–Ramamoorthy | |
| 1962 | Prajasakthi | Telugu | Avanilo Yedhi Nashinchadu | Viswanathan–Ramamoorthy | |
| 1962 | Senthamarai | Tamil | Kanavae Kaathal Vaazhvae | Viswanathan–Ramamoorthy | |
| 1962 | Thendral Veesum | Tamil | Yaen Mama Kovama | Viswanathan–Ramamoorthy | L. R. Eswari |
| 1962 | Veerathirumagan | Tamil | Azhivadhu Pol Thondrum | Viswanathan–Ramamoorthy | |
| 1963 | Bangari | Kannada | Naa Hutti Beledaadu | G. K. Venkatesh | |
| 1963 | Kanyarathna | Kannada | Kanya Rathna | G. K. Venkatesh | |
| 1963 | Malli Maduve | Kannada | Naguve Naaka Aluve Naraka | G. K. Venkatesh | P. B. Sreenivas |
| 1964 | Padithaal Mattum Podhuma | Tamil | Kalam Seidha Komalithanathil | Viswanathan–Ramamoorthy | P. B. Sreenivas & A. L. Raghavan |
| 1965 | Hello Mister Zamindar | Tamil | Sondhamumillai Oru Bandhamum Illai | Viswanathan–Ramamoorthy | |
| 1965 | Thayin Karunai | Tamil | Ponnu Mannu Pennum Moonum | G. K. Venkatesh | |
| 1967 | Rajadurgada Rahasya | Kannada | Rajadurgada Rahasya | G. K. Venkatesh | |
| 1970 | Sridevi | Telugu | Gundemalli Chenduchoosi | G. K. Venkatesh | Ramola |
| 1971 | Kasturi Nivasa | Kannada | Aadisidaata Besara Moodi | G. K. Venkatesh | |
| 1971 | Sabatham | Tamil | Aatathai Aadu Puliyudan Aadu | G. K. Venkatesh | A. L. Raghavan & L. R. Eswari |
| 1974 | Bhakta Kumbara | Kannada | Guru Bramham | G. K. Venkatesh | |
| 1974 | Bhootayyana Maga Ayyu | Kannada | Virasavemba Vishake | G. K. Venkatesh | |
| 1974 | Bhootayyana Maga Ayyu | Kannada | Maariye Gathiyendu | G. K. Venkatesh | P. B. Srinivas |
| 1975 | Piriyavidai | Tamil | Karunaikkadalae Kaarmugilvanna | G. K. Venkatesh | P. Susheela |
| 1977 | Kakana Kote | Kannada | Kari Haidanemboru | C. Ashwath | B. V. Karanth & C. Ashwath |
| 1977 | Kavikkuyil | Tamil | Maanathilae Meenirukka.... Udhayam Varugindrathe | Ilayaraja | S. Janaki |
| 1979 | Ravanude Ramudayithe? | Telugu | Ravanude Ramudayithe? | G. K. Venkatesh | |
| 1981 | Nenjil Oru Mul | Tamil | Vaazhkkaiyenum Paadhaithanile | G. K. Venkatesh | |
| 1982 | Maro Malupu | Telugu | Pranchabhushana Bahumuloolarucito Paalindlu | G. K. Venkatesh | |
| 1982 | Maro Malupu | Telugu | Vetalan Pettakuminka Nannanchu | G. K. Venkatesh | |

== See also ==
- Rajan–Nagendra
- Upendra Kumar
- Cinema of Karnataka
