= Goa Dalli CID 999 =

Goadalli CID 999
- Poster released during the film's re-release in Himalaya Theatre in Bangalore in 1985
- Directed by: Dorai–Bhagavan
- Written by: Dorai–Bhagavan
- Produced by: Dorai-Bhagawan
- Starring: Rajkumar; Lakshmi; Narasimharaju
- Cinematography: B. Dorairaj
- Edited by: Venkatram
- Music by: G. K. Venkatesh
- Production company: Anupam Movies
- Release date: 1968
- Running time: 144 minutes
- Country: India
- Language: Kannada

Goadalli CID 999 is a 1968 Indian Kannada-language spy thriller film written, directed and produced by Dorai–Bhagavan duo. The film starred Rajkumar in the lead role as a detective. Indian actress Lakshmi made her debut in lead role with this film. Sri Lankan based actress Sabeetha Perera also made her Indian movie debut with this film. The film had musical score by G. K. Venkatesh with lyrics by R. N. Jayagopal.The film met with highly positive response upon release and paved the way for many more such Bond style of movies in the combination of the director duo with lead actor Rajkumar.

The film is the second movie in the CID 999 Franchise created along the lines of the James Bond and James Bond - styled films with the first one being Jedara Bale. The success of this movie led to two more sequels - Operation Jackpot Nalli C.I.D 999 and Operation Diamond Racket. The movie did not have a male playback singer.

The 2019 Kannada movie Bell Bottom had its protagonist Diwakara being influenced by this movie in his childhood to become a detective.

== Cast ==
- Rajkumar as Prakash "CID 999"
- Narasimharaju as "CID 888"
- B. Raghavendra Rao
- Shakti Prasad as Suresh
- Janakiram
- Jayakumar
- Lakshmi as Veena
- Sabeetha Perera
- Jyothi Lakshmi
- Vijayabhanu

== Soundtrack ==
The music of the film was composed by G. K. Venkatesh with lyrics by R. N. Jayagopal. In the course of his concert in Bangalore on 16.11.2019, Ilaiyaraja had himself disclosed that his first assignment as a Sessions Guitarist for music director G.K. Venkatesh was for this film.

Track listing
No.	Title	Singer(s)	Length
1.	"Love in Goa"	S. Janaki
2.	"Minchidu Ee Hennu"	Renuka
3.	"Balige Baa"	L. R. Eswari
4.	"Kangale Heliri"	L. R. Eswari
