= Kanyarathna =

- Directed by: J. D. Thotan
- Screenplay by: Vijaya Narasimha; Chi. Sadashivaiah
- Story by: Vijaya Narasimha; Chi. Sadashivaiah
- Produced by: D. B. Narayan
- Starring: Rajkumar; Leelavathi
- Cinematography: M. K. Raju
- Edited by: B. Gopala Rao; T. Krishna
- Music by: G. K. Venkatesh
- Production company: DBN Productions
- Release date: 14 March 1963
- Running time: 144 minutes
- Country: India
- Language: Kannada

Kanyarathna is a 1963 Indian Kannada language film directed by J. D. Thotan in his directorial debut. It stars Dr. Rajkumar and Leelavathi. The supporting cast features Rajashankar, Balakrishna, Dikki Madhava Rao, Rathnakar and Sowcar Janaki.

== Cast ==
- Rajkumar as Raju
- Leelavathi
- Raja Shankar as Shivaprakash
- Balakrishna
- Dikki Madhava Rao
- Rathnakar
- Sowcar Janaki
- Ramadevi
- Papamma
- B. Jaya
- Sharadadevi
- Ashwath Narayana

== Soundtrack ==
Kanyarathna

Soundtrack album by G. K. Venkatesh
- Released: 1963
- Genre: Feature film soundtrack
- Length: 21:05
- Label: Saregama

G. K. Venkatesh composed the music for the soundtracks and the lyrics were written by K. R. Seetharama Shastry, K. Prabhakar Shastry, Chi. Sadashivaiah and Vijaya Narasimha. The soundtrack album consists of seven tracks.

Tracklist
No.	Title	Lyrics	Artist(s)	Length
1.	"Binkada Singaari"	K. R. Seetharama Shastry (Kurasi)	P. B. Sreenivas	3:28
2.	"Suvvi Suvvi"	K. Prabhakar Shastry	P. B. Sreenivas, S. Janaki	3:10
3.	"Yelliharo Nalla"	Chi. Sadashivaiah	P. B. Sreenivas, S. Janaki	2:48
4.	"Onde Mathu"	Vijaya Narasimha	S. Janaki	2:54
5.	"Kanya Rathna (Title)"	Instrumental	G. K. Venkatesh	1:48
6.	"Manava Kadda"	Chi. Sadashivaiah	S. Janaki	3:18
7.	"Mysore Dasara Bombe"	K. Prabhakar Shastry	T. A. Mothi	3:39
Total length:				21:05
