= Sandhya Raga =

- Directed by: A. C. Narasimha Murthy; S. K. Bhagavan
- Screenplay by: S. K. Bhagavan
- Based on: Sandhya Raga by A. N. Krishna Rao
- Produced by: A. C. Narasimha Murthy; A. Prabhakara Rao
- Starring: Dr. Rajkumar; Bharathi Vishnuvardhan; Udaykumar; Narasimharaju; K. S. Ashwath
- Cinematography: B. Dorairaj
- Edited by: N. C. Rajan
- Music by: G. K. Venkatesh; M. Balamurali Krishna
- Production company: Shailashree Productions
- Release date: 22 December 1966
- Country: India
- Language: Kannada

Sandhya Raga is a 1966 Indian Kannada-language film directed by A. C. Narasimha Murthy and co-produced by him alongside A. Prabhakara Rao. The film stars Dr. Rajkumar, Bharathi Vishnuvardhan, Udaykumar, Narasimharaju and K. S. Ashwath. The musical score was composed by G. K. Venkatesh.

The famous song "Nambide Ninna Naadadevathe" features three versions: one sung by M. Balamuralikrishna, another by Bhimsen Joshi (during the climax), and a female version by S. Janaki. Director S. K Bhagawan revealed that, though he directed the film, he was not officially credited for it. He also mentioned that A. N. Krishna Rao and Beechi had co-written the dialogues with him for the film. The film is based on the novel of same name by Rao.

== Plot ==
Sandhya Raga follows the journey of Lakshmana (portrayed by Rajkumar), who rejects the conventional pursuits of fame and wealth in favor of the challenging yet fulfilling path of mastering music. Ultimately, his dedication to the ares wins the admiration of music connoisseurs. The film is based A. N. Krishna Rao's novel of the same name.

== Cast ==
- Dr. Rajkumar as Lakshmana
- Bharathi Vishnuvardhan as Jayalakshmi
- Udaykumar as Rama
- Shylashri
- Narasimharaju as Venkatesha
- K. S. Ashwath as Srinivasa Rao
- Pandari Bai as Meenakshi
- H. R. Shastry as Mulbagal Chennappa
- Raghavendra Rao
- Kuppuraj
- Krishna Shastry
- Master Venkatesh
- Ashwath Narayan
- Shanthamma

== Soundtrack ==
The film is a musical, with the music composed by G. K. Venkatesh. Pandit Bhimsen Joshi performed five songs in the movi, while V. Balamuralikrishna sang three songs. The song 'nambidhe ninna' was sung by three singers, including S Janaki, and became a landmark in her career in Kannada films.

No.	Song	Singers	Lyrics	Length (m:ss)
1	"Nambide Ninna Nada Devathe"	Bhimsen Joshi	G. V. Iyer	03:45
2	"Nambide Ninna Nada Devathe"	M. Balamurali Krishna	G. V. Iyer	
3	"Ee Pariya Sobagu"	Pt. Bhimsen Joshi, M. Balamurali Krishna	Purandaradasa	03:26
4	"Kannadathi Thaaye Baa"	Pt. Bhimsen Joshi	G. V. Iyer	03:47
5	"Nambide Ninna Nada Devathe"	S. Janaki	G. V. Iyer	03:45
6	"Deena Naa Bandiruve"	P. B. Sreenivas	R. N Jayagopal	
7	"Guruvina Gulama Naaguva"	Pt. Bhimsen Joshi		
8	"Theliso Illa Mulugiso"	Pt. Bhimsen Joshi	Purandaradasa	02:38
