= Pratidwani =

- Directed by: B. Dorai Raj; S. K. Bhagavan
- Written by: G. Balasubramanyam
- Screenplay by: B. Dorai Raj; S. K. Bhagavan
- Story by: Shivam
- Produced by: B. Dorai Raj; S. K. Bhagavan
- Starring: Rajkumar; Rajesh; Aarathi; Narasimharaju; Balakrishna; Pandaribai; Dinesh
- Cinematography: Chittibabu; B. Dorai Raj
- Edited by: G. Venkatram
- Music by: G. K. Venkatesh
- Production companies: Vikram Studios; Sharada Studios
- Distributed by: Srinivas Pictures; Vijaya Pictures Circuit
- Release date: 11 October 1971
- Running time: 147 minutes
- Country: India
- Language: Kannada

Pratidwani is a 1971 Kannada-language film directed by Dorai–Bhagavan. The film stars Rajkumar, Rajesh and Aarathi, along with Narasimharaju, Balakrishna, Pandaribai in supporting roles, with Dinesh as the leader of the smugglers.

== Plot ==
As the name represents, pratidhwani (resound) in other terms, means reacting to what has happened. The film starts with the smuggler Dinesh whose driver is killed along with his wife, and daughter. But his two sons are left alive and take an oath to kill the smuggler. When the children are grown up, they are separated. Anand (Rajesh) is a robber. Ashok (Rajkumar) is a police inspector. Both are in search of the killer. Ashok meets Aarathi and falls in love with her. Once Anand comes to rob Ashok's house and sees his childhood photo. The brothers reunite and go on attacking the killer per their own plan. Finally, with help of a small drama, they release the killer and send him to jail.

== Cast ==
- Rajkumar as Ashok
- Arathi
- Rajesh as Anand
- Balakrishna
- Narasimharaju as Narasayya
- Pandari Bai as Meenakshi
- Dinesh as Bhushan
- R. T. Ramadevi
- Tiger Prabhakar

== Soundtrack ==
Track #	Song	Singer(s)
1	"Mareyadiru sneha"	P. B. Srinivas
2	"Eko eno haaduva aase"	P B Srinivas
3	"Sari naa hogi baruve"	P B Srinivas, S Janaki
4	"Bekagide sakagide"	S. Janaki
