= Rajadurgada Rahasya =

- Directed by: A. C. Narasimha Murthy; S. K. Bhagvan
- Written by: Nandana
- Screenplay by: Nandana
- Produced by: A. Vasudeva Rao; T. Dwarakanath
- Starring: Rajkumar; Bharathi; Udaykumar; Narasimharaju; Dinesh
- Cinematography: B. Dorairaj
- Edited by: N. C. Rajan
- Music by: G. K. Venkatesh
- Production company: Krishnodaya Chithra
- Distributed by: Krishnodaya Chithra
- Release date: 1967
- Country: India
- Language: Kannada

Rajadurgada Rahasya ( transl. Mystery of Rajadurga) is a 1967 Indian Kannada-language film, co-directed by A. C. Narasimha Murthy and S.K.Bhagwan, and produced by A. Vasudeva Rao and T. Dwarakanath. The film stars Rajkumar, Bharathi, Udaykumar, Narasimharaju and Dinesh, with a musical score composed by G. K. Venkatesh. Rajkumar plays dual roles in this film. Although S.K.Bhagwan was the primary director, he revealed that the directorial credit was shared with Narasimha Murthy, who was the chief financier of the film. The film was later dubbed in Tamil as Malaikotai Marmam. This was also the final film in which Bhagwan directed actress Bharathi Vishnuvardhan.

== Cast ==
- Rajkumar
- Udaykumar
- Narasimharaju
- Dinesh
- Kashinath
- Ganapathi Bhat
- Rajan
- Swamy
- Bangalore Nagesh
- Bharathi
- Papamma
- Jyothi
- B. V. Radha
- Suryakumari
- Lakshmi

== Soundtrack ==
The music was composed by G. K. Venkatesh.

No.	Song	Singers	Lyrics	Length (m:ss)
1	"Ammamma"	S. Janaki	R. N. Jayagopal	04:01
2	"Balli Sontatha"	P. B. Sreenivas	R. N. Jayagopal	03:11
3	"Devi Devi"	P. B. Sreenivas	R. N. Jayagopal	03:42
4	"Kaanuva Thanaka"	S. Janaki, P. B. Sreenivas	R. N. Jayagopal	04:37
5	"Moodana Dinda"	S. Janaki	R. N. Jayagopal	04:23
6	Title Music		R. N. Jayagopal	02:11
