= Jedara Bale =

1968 film by Dorai–Bhagavan

- Promotional poster
- Directed by: Dorai–Bhagavan
- Written by: Dorai–Bhagavan
- Produced by: T. P. Venugopal
- Starring: Rajkumar; Jayanthi; K.S. Ashwath; Narasimharaju; Udayakumar
- Cinematography: B. Dorairaj; R. Chittibabu
- Edited by: N. C. Rajan; Raghupathi
- Music by: G. K. Venkatesh
- Distributed by: Manthralaya Movies
- Release date: 12 January 1968
- Running time: 139 minutes
- Country: India
- Language: Kannada

Jedara Bale ( transl. Spider's web) is a 1968 Indian Kannada-language spy thriller written and directed by the duo Dorai–Bhagavan. It stars Rajkumar in the lead role, alongside Jayanthi, K. S. Ashwath, Narasimharaju, and Udayakumar. The music for the film was composed by G. K. Venkatesh. The film is the first installment in the CID 999 franchise, which went on to include three sequels: Goa Dalli CID 999 (1968), Operation Jackpot Nalli C.I.D 999 (1969), and Operation Diamond Racket (1978). The CID 999 franchise is notable as the first Indian film series to consist of four installments.

The film is regarded as one of the earliest Indian productions to adopt the James Bond-style spy thriller genre. Rajkumar's portrayal of CID 999 made him one of the first Indian actors to take on a character inspired by James Bond in a leading role. Bhagavan reportedly studied 11 James Bond novels before creating the film. Produced on a modest budget of under ₹3 lakh, the film recovered ₹2 lakh from the sale of dubbing rights alone. It also introduced cabaret dance sequences to South Indian cinema.

Jedara Bale and its subsequent installments played a significant role in shaping Kannada cinema. The franchise's success inspired similar spy thrillers in other South Indian languages. Critics have praised the film for its engaging plot and effective suspense, which have been noted to hold their appeal even decades after its release. In 2020, Film Companion highlighted its narrative-driven approach as a defining aspect. The film also contributed to Rajkumar's stardom and is credited with bringing a shift in the cinematic trends of Kannada films. It was the first character based trilogy in India.

== Plot ==
Prakash, code-named CID 999, is assigned the mission of preventing a formula that can turn any metal into gold from falling into the hands of criminals.

== Cast ==
- Dr. Rajkumar as Prakash aka "CID 999"
- Jayanthi as "Minni"
- Udaykumar as Gopinath Kumar
- Narasimharaju as Taxi driver Baby (CID Agent 888)
- K. S. Ashwath as Rao Bahadur Narasimha Rao
- Shylashri
- M. P. Shankar as Kumar's associate
- Shakti Prasad as Jeevan Rao
- R. T. Rama as Shantha
- Janakiram as Janakiram
- Vijayalalitha
- Dinesh

== Production ==
It was also the first south Indian film to use the miniature faking technique for a car explosion sequence. Additionally, it was Rajkumar's first film without a male playback singer.

== Soundtrack ==
The music for the film was composed by G. K. Venkatesh with Ilayaraja serving as the assistant. Lyrics for the soundtrack was written by R. N. Jayagopal. The album consists of four tracks.

Track listing
No.	Title	Singer(s)	Length
1.	"Hello Mister"	S. Janaki
2.	"Anjade Alukade"	S. Janaki	5:15
3.	"Iniya Banda Samaya"	S. Janaki
4.	"Yaaro Aadalu Bandavaru"	L. R. Eswari	5:24

== Legacy ==
Amar Ujala referred to Rajkumar as the "James Bond of India". The film is considered a game-changer in Rajkumar's career and is credited with bringing a significant shift in Kannada cinema. The film is credited with inspiring a distinct 'desi Bond ' genre, leading the Tamil, Telugu and Malayalam film industries to attempting replicating the Kannada spy movie genre, though there were earlier, less developed attempts in those industries The film's tremendous success prompted more serious efforts in other South Indian languages, featuring leading stars such as Jaishankar in Tamil; Krishna in Telugu and Prem Nazir in Malayalam.

== Sources ==
- Vijayasarathy, R.G. (17 April 2006). "The best of Dr Rajkumar". Rediff India Abroad.
