= Operation Jackpot Nalli C.I.D 999 =

1969 Indian film by S.K Bhagavan

- Title card
- Directed by: Dorai–Bhagavan
- Written by: Dorai–Bhagavan
- Produced by: Dorai–Bhagavan
- Starring: Rajkumar; Narasimharaju; Rekha; Surekha
- Cinematography: B. Dorairaj
- Edited by: Venkataram
- Music by: G. K. Venkatesh
- Production company: Golden Studio
- Distributed by: Reliable Movies
- Release date: 1969
- Country: India
- Language: Kannada

Operation Jackpot Nalli C.I.D 999 is a 1969 Indian Kannada-language spy thriller film directed and produced by Dorai–Bhagavan. It stars Rajkumar, Narasimharaju and Rekha.

The film is the third in the CID 999 franchise, created along the lines of the James Bond and James Bond-styled films, with the first two being Jedara Bale & Goa Dalli CID 999. The success of this movie led to one more sequel - Operation Diamond Racket. This was the debut movie of actress Rekha in a lead role.

With the release of this movie, CID 999 became the first character based trilogy movie in India. This movie was praised for its angled lighting, clever use of shadows and well thought out decor such as the atmospheric arches in the lair - all of which added an element of noir to the movie. This is the longest title for a film starring Rajkumar when his movie names are written in Kannada. The movie did not have a male playback singer.

== Premise ==
CID 999 aka Prakash is assigned to investigate about a nuclear scientist named Shekar, who created a formula named Plasma Binson, which is used to destroy any object in earth, and destroy the formula from getting into wrong hands. How does Prakash destroy the formula forms the crux of the plot.

== Cast ==
- Rajkumar as CID 999 Prakash
- Narasimharaju as CID 888 Baby
- Rekha as Mona
- Surekha

== Soundtrack ==
No.	Title	Singer(s)	Length
1.	"Baalalli Ondagona Baa Illi"	L. R. Eswari
2.	"Enu Ivanabali"	L R Eswari
3.	"I Thank You"	L R Eswari
