= Sri Srinivasa Kalyana (1952 film) =

- Directed by: D. Shankar Singh; B. Vittalacharya
- Written by: Hunsur Krishnamurthy (dialogue)
- Produced by: D. Shankar Singh; B. Vittalacharya
- Starring: Vimalananda Das; Prathima Devi
- Music by: P. Shyamanna
- Production company: Mahathma Pictures
- Release date: 1952
- Running time: 135 minutes
- Country: India
- Language: Kannada

Sri Srinivasa Kalyana is a 1952 Indian Kannada-language Hindu mythological film directed by D. Shankar Singh and B. Vittalacharya. Dr. Rajkumar played Agastya, one of the seven Saptarshis. It was the only Kannada film to be released in 1952.

== Cast ==
- Vimalananda Das as Srinivasa
- Prathima Devi as Padmavati
- Dr. Rajkumar as Agastya (Credited as S. P. Mutthuraj)
- M. N. Lakshmi Devi
- Amirbai Karnataki
- M. N. Veerabhadrappa
- U. Mahabalarao
- Jayashri
- Harini
- Radhabai

== Production ==
Dr. Rajkumar was reportedly paid ₹30 for his role that "he remembered [...] was over before he recognized himself in the scene". He bought a shawl for his mother using the money.
