= Sodari =

- Rajkumar and Pandari Bai in Sodari
- Directed by: T. V. Singh Thakur
- Screenplay by: Hunsur Krishnamurthy; G. V. Iyer
- Story by: Hunsur Krishnamurthy; G. V. Iyer
- Produced by: G. N. Vishwanatha Shetty; T. V. Singh Takur
- Starring: Pandari Bai; Rajkumar; Narasimha Raju
- Cinematography: B. Dorairaj
- Edited by: N. C. Rajan
- Music by: Padmanabha Shasthri
- Distributed by: Viswa Kala Chitra
- Release date: 1955
- Running time: 136 minutes
- Country: India
- Language: Kannada

Sodari is a 1955 Indian Kannada-language film directed by T. V. Singh Thakur. The film stars Pandari Bai, Narasimha Raju and Rajkumar. The music for the film was jointly composed by Padmanabha Shasthri and G. K. Venkatesh. The story of the film is based on the life of Hemavati, the pious wife of King Kailasanatha. She faces numerous hardships along with her children when Kailasanatha loses his kingdom due to a drought. The actress M. Jayashree plays a negative role of Chanchaladevi, a cunning relative of Hemavati. The movie is based on GV Iyer's stage play Anna Thangi which was based on the popular legend of Nalla Thangaal whose story had earlier been adapted in Malayalam in 1950 as Nalla Thanka and later in Tamil as Nalla Thangal (1955).

== Cast ==
- Pandari Bai as Hemavati
- M. Jayashree as Chanchaladevi
- Indira Acharya as Chandrika
- Lakshmidevi as Geeta
- Rajkumar as Kailasanatha
- Raghavendra Rao
- G. V. Iyer as Sarvaantaryami
- Narasimharaju as Madana

== Soundtrack ==
The music of the film was composed by Padmanabha Shasthri, with lyrics penned by Hunsur Krishnamurthy.

Track#	Song	Singer(s)	Lyrics	Duration
1	"Hey Deva Girijaadhava"	P. Leela	Hunsur Krishnamurthy	2:41
2	"Nyaayave Devaadhi Deva"	A. M. Rajah	Hunsur Krishnamurthy	2:34
3	"Shrungara Madhanana"	P. Susheela	Hunsur Krishnamurthy	
4	"Belaguva Baa Gelathi"	P. Leela	Hunsur Krishnamurthy	
5	"Aalisade Dayathorisade"	P. Leela, A. M. Rajah	Hunsur Krishnamurthy	
6	"Alabeda Alabeda O Nanna Chinna"	P. Leela	Hunsur Krishnamurthy	
7	"Vidhi Vilasava Enembe"	A. M. Rajah	Hunsur Krishnamurthy	
8	"Oora Serona Begane"	Pendyala Nageswara Rao	Hunsur Krishnamurthy	
9	"Samsaaravembude Manninda Maadida Madikeyu"	P. Leela	Hunsur Krishnamurthy	
10	"Anathalaadenu Ee Jagadali"	P. Leela	Hunsur Krishnamurthy	
