= Manassiddare Marga =

- Directed by: M. R. Vittal
- Screenplay by: M. Narendra Babu
- Produced by: Srikanth Nahatha; Srikanth Patel
- Starring: Rajkumar; Rajashankar; Narasimharaju; K. S. Ashwath
- Cinematography: Srikanth; Rajaram
- Edited by: S. P. N. Krishna; T. P. Velayudham
- Music by: M. Ranga Rao
- Production companies: Srikanth & Srikanth Enterprises
- Distributed by: Srikanth & Srikanth Enterprises
- Release date: 1967
- Running time: 168 min
- Country: India
- Language: Kannada

Manassiddare Marga is a 1967 Indian Kannada-language film, directed by M. R. Vittal and produced by Srikanth Nahatha and Srikanth Patel. The film stars Rajkumar, Rajashankar, Narasimharaju and K. S. Ashwath. The film has musical score by M. Ranga Rao. The film was a remake of 1957 Hindi movie Bada Bhai which had also been remade earlier in Telugu in 1959 as Sabhash Ramudu. The picturization of the song Ee Jeevana Bevu Bella was the first instance of a Kannada movie using the back projection technology.

== Cast ==
- Rajkumar as Ramachandra "Ramu" Rao
- Rajashankar as Srikanth Rao
- Narasimharaju as Paramatma
- K. S. Ashwath as Police Commissioner Narayan Rao
- M. P. Shankar as Prakash
- Ranga as Inspector Suresh
- Dinesh as Johnny
- Rathnakar as Ranga
- Shastry
- Jayanthi as Lakshmi
- Udaya Chandrika as Mala
- Shylashri as Asha
- B. V. Radha
- Kamalamma
- Padmashree as Radha (credited as Baby Padmashree)

== Soundtrack ==
The music was composed by M. Ranga Rao.

No.	Song	Singers	Lyrics	Length (m:ss)
1	"Madhura Mojina"	L. R. Eswari	Vijaya Narasimha	03:37
2	"O Chandamama"	L. R. Eswari	M. Narendra Babu	03:26
3	"Ee Jeevana Bevu Bella"	P. B. Sreenivas	M. Narendra Babu	
