= Hari Bhakta =

- Newspaper ad snippet
- Directed by: T. V. Singh Thakur
- Screenplay by: G. V. Iyer
- Produced by: G. N. Vishwanatha Shetty; T. V. Singh Thakur
- Starring: Rajkumar; Pandari Bai
- Cinematography: B. Dorairaj
- Edited by: N. C. Rajan
- Music by: G. K. Venkatesh
- Distributed by: Viswa Kala Chitra
- Release date: 1956
- Running time: 148 minutes
- Country: India
- Language: Kannada

Hari Bhakta is a 1956 Kannada-language film directed by T. V. Singh Thakur. The film stars Rajkumar and Pandari Bai. It had Mynavathi, Narasimharaju, G. V. Iyer, and H. R. Shastry playing supporting roles. The movie is based on the life of Pundarika which had earlier been adapted in Tamil as Haridas (1944) and in Telugu as Panduranga Mahatyam (1957).

== Cast ==
- Rajkumar as Hari / Pundarika
- Pandari Bai as Lakshmi, Hari's wife
- Mynavathi
- Narasimharaju as Shankar, Hari's friend
- G. V. Iyer
- H. R. Shastry as Hari's father
- Shanthamma as Hari's mother

== Soundtrack ==
The music of the film was composed by G. K. Venkatesh and lyrics written by K. R. Seetharama Sastry.

Track#	Song	Singer(s)	Duration
1	"Taayi Tandeyara Seveya "	Ghantasala	4:12
2	"Deva Darusanava Needeya"	Ghantasala	
3	"Aananda dina satige"	P.Susheela & chorus	
