= Eradu Nakshatragalu =

- Title card
- Directed by: Singeetham Srinivasa Rao
- Screenplay by: Singeetham Srinivasa Rao
- Produced by: Sharadamma Varadaraj; Shivaputtaswamy
- Starring: Rajkumar; Ambika; Master Lohith
- Cinematography: B. C. Gowrishankar
- Edited by: P. Bhaktavatsalam
- Music by: G. K. Venkatesh
- Production company: Kamakshi Cine Enterprises
- Release date: 1983
- Running time: 135 minutes
- Country: India
- Language: Kannada

Eradu Nakshatragalu ( transl. Two Stars) is a 1983 Indian Kannada-language film, directed by Singeetham Srinivasa Rao. The film stars Rajkumar, Ambika and Puneeth Rajkumar. The movie is famous for its evergreen songs which were composed by G. K. Venkatesh. The plot of the movie is based on the popular novel The Prince and the Pauper by Mark Twain. Puneeth Rajkumar played a double role in the movie and remains his only double-role movie in which both the characters appear together on-screen.

== Plot ==
The story follows two boys who look exactly alike—one is a rich, royal child named Raja, and the other is a poor street boy called Appu. By chance, they meet in the palace grounds and are amazed to see someone who mirrors their face. Curious about each other’s lives, they impulsively decide to switch places.

Raja steps out into the real world as Appu, while Appu moves into the luxuries of the palace. As they adjust to their new surroundings, each boy faces unexpected problems. The real Appu struggles to act like a prince—he must attend royal lessons, follow palace rules, and appear at official ceremonies. Meanwhile, Prince Raja finds life on the streets tough, dealing with hunger, rough living conditions, and the harsh rules of survival.

Despite these challenges, the boys learn lessons they never would have in their original worlds. Appu learns discipline, responsibility, and how power can be lonely. Raja learns the value of friendship, humility, and the tough realities of ordinary life. Eventually, their secret swap is discovered. With the help of their loyal guardian, an honest minister, and a caring palace guard, they manage to set things right. In the end, both boys return to their rightful places. Appu, having grown with confidence and wisdom, is awarded a chance to improve his life. Prince Raja, kinder and more grounded than before, brings positive change to his kingdom. The film ends on a heartwarming note, showing that stepping into another’s shoes can teach empathy, kindness, and true understanding.

== Cast ==
- Dr. Rajkumar as Vijaya
- Puneeth Rajkumar (credited as Master Lohith) as Rajkumara and Raja (double role)
- Ambika as Vasundhara
- Shakti Prasad as Raja's father
- Leelavathi as Raja's mother
- Rajanand as Maharaja, Rajkumara's father
- Bhatti Mahadevappa as Mahamantri
- Thoogudeepa Srinivas as Senapathi
- Shivaram as Rajkumara's teacher
- Lokanath as Vijaya's father
- Uma Shivakumar as Madamma
- M. S. Umesh as Chandra

== Soundtrack ==
Eradu Nakshatragalu

Soundtrack album by G. K. Venkatesh
- Released: 1983
- Genre: Feature film soundtrack
- Label: Sangeetha Music

Track #	Song	Singer(s)	Lyrics
1	"Eke Malli Hange"	Dr. Rajkumar, Vani Jairam	Chi. Udaya Shankar
2	"Gelathi Baradu"	Dr. Rajkumar	Chi. Udaya Shankar
3	"Nanna Udupu Ninnadu"	Master Lohith (Puneeth Rajkumar)	Chi. Udaya Shankar
4	"Howdu Endare"	Dr. Rajkumar, Master Lohith, Vani Jairam	Chi. Udaya Shankar
5	"Amma Kannu"	Master Lohith, Sulochana	Chi. Udaya Shankar

== Awards ==
- Karnataka State Film Awards
  - Best Child actor - Master Lohith

== External Source ==
- Eradu Nakshatragalu at IMDb
