= Operation Diamond Racket =

- DVD cover of the film
- Directed by: Dorai–Bhagavan
- Written by: Dorai–Bhagavan
- Produced by: Dorai–Bhagavan
- Starring: Rajkumar; Padmapriya
- Cinematography: P. S. Prakash
- Edited by: P. Bhaktavatsalam
- Music by: G. K. Venkatesh
- Distributed by: Anupam Movies
- Release date: 11 August 1978
- Running time: 165 minutes
- Country: India
- Language: Kannada

Operation Diamond Racket is a 1978 Indian Kannada-language action spy thriller film produced and directed by Dorai–Bhagavan. The film stars Rajkumar, alongside Padmapriya, Chandralekha, Vajramuni, Thoogudeepa Srinivas, Tiger Prabhakar and M. B. Shetty. The music was composed by G. K. Venkatesh, while cinematography and editing were handled by P. S. Prakash and P. Bhaktavatsalam.

The film was the fourth and the final film in the CID 999 Franchise created along the lines of the James Bond and James Bond – styled films following Jedara Bale (1968), Goa Dalli CID 999 (1968) and Operation Jackpot Nalli C.I.D 999 (1969). Operation Diamond Racket was re-released in 2013. It is the only colour film in the franchise and also the only film in the franchise to not feature Narasimharaju. It was dubbed in Hindi in 1983 as Jasoos 999 and in Telugu as Savaal Goodachari 999. A fifth film in the franchise titled Operation Golden Gang was announced but dropped owing to average response to this film coupled with high budget for the sequel. This was also the first film of the franchise to have a male playback singer.

The film was shot in Nepal and became the first Kannada film to be shot outside India, but Singaporenalli Raja Kulla, which released four months later is widely credited for it, which started the trend of Kannada films being shot outside India since it was shot in a country which is not an Indian neighbour. The core plot of the film was based on Ian Fleming's novel Diamonds Are Forever where James Bond impersonates a diamond smuggler to infiltrate a smuggling ring to uncover a diamond smuggling conspiracy where his old rival wants to use the diamonds to build a space-based giant laser weapon and blackmail the world with nuclear supremacy.

== Plot ==
Prakash aka CID 999, a CID officer, solves the gold smuggling cases, where the CID Chief informs about increase in diamond smuggling and missing case of top scientists. Prakash traces the lead from his colleague Madhu and locates David, the local kingpin. He impersonates as David and traps Lalita, who has the diamonds. Prakash kills David and entrusts Lalita to Madhu. Prakash goes to the hideout warehouse, where David was supposed to drop the diamonds, finds the diamonds and alerts the cops.

Prakash returns, only to find that Lalita escaped and Madhu dead. Meena, Madhu's sister vows vengeance against Madhu's killers. After checking an address in Lalitha's bag, which is located in Kathmandu, Prakash and Meena act as a honeymoon couple and leave for Kathmandu. Monzein, Prakash's friend and fellow-agent helps him with clues about antique shops, which are suspected to be involved in smuggling. Prakash spends quite some time, posing as a tourist, but cannot locate any clues about the smuggling gang. Vishwanath, the kingpin at Kathmandu tries to kill Meena and Prakash, but Prakash overpowers him.

Frustrated, Vishwanath orders his secretary Drenko to befriend Meena. Drenko kills Monzein's entire family and kidnaps Meena. Prakash finds a radar on top of a building at a remote site and finds it to be the secret hide-out and enters by disguising himself as one of the henchman. He observes a speech, where the diamonds are used as a powerful beam to bring down any fighter jet-planes, submarine or military installation. Prakash gets caught and is thrown into a snake cage, along with Meena. However, Prakash and Meena escape, where Prakash overpowers the place, kills all the henchmen and their boss. Prakash frees up Meena and escapes, where he burns down the place using a watch bomb.

== Cast ==
- Dr. Rajkumar as CID 999 Prakash
- Padmapriya as Meena, Madhu's sister
- Vajramuni as 'Golden Crocodile'
- Rajanand
- Chethan Ramarao
- Thoogudeepa Srinivas as Vikram Singh
- Tiger Prabhakar as David
- Shani Mahadevappa as waiter in hotel
- M. B. Shetty (credited as Fighter Shetty)
- Raji
- Jennifer as Jennifer
- Mamatha Shenoy
- Chandralekha
- Seema Kapoor
- Babbi
- Santhosh
- Muguru P. Guru
- H. P. Ramakrishna
- Bheemaraj
- Nithin Kumar

== Soundtrack ==
Operation Diamond Racket

Soundtrack album by G. K. Venkatesh
- Recorded: 1978
- Genre: Feature film soundtrack
- Length: 18:21
- Label: Saregama

The music of the film was composed by G. K. Venkatesh, with lyrics penned by Chi. Udaya Shankar. The song "If You Come Today", sung by Rajkumar became popular for being written entirely in broken English.

Track listing
No.	Title	Lyrics	Singer(s)	Length
1.	"Nee Naduguveyeke"	Chi. Udaya Shankar	Rajkumar, S. Janaki	4:24
2.	"If You Come Today"	S. K. Bhagwan and Chi. Udaya Shankar	Rajkumar	4:44
3.	"Alli Illi Noduve"	Chi. Udaya Shankar	Rajkumar, S. Janaki	4:29
4.	"Nodideya"	Chi. Udaya Shankar	Vani Jayaram	4:24
Total length:				18:21

== Release ==
The title of the movie created confusion among fans as to whether it was Racket or Rocket.

The film was re-released across 40 theatres in Karnataka on 31 May 2013. The film received a good opening, having collected ₹1 lakh (US$1,000) on the opening day in Kapali Theatre, Bangalore.
