= Ohileshwara =

- Poster
- Directed by: T. V. Singh Thakur
- Screenplay by: G. V. Iyer
- Produced by: Viswa Kala Chitra
- Starring: Rajkumar; Kalyan Kumar; Narasimharaju
- Cinematography: B. Dorairaj
- Edited by: N. C. Rajan; Venkataram
- Music by: G. K. Venkatesh
- Distributed by: Viswakala Chithra
- Release date: 1956
- Running time: 148 minutes
- Country: India
- Language: Kannada

Ohileshwara is a 1956 Kannada-language film directed by T.V. Singh Thakur. The film starred Rajkumar and Kalyan Kumar. It had Narasimharaju, G.V. Iyer and H. R. Shastry in supporting roles.

The film marks the first time singer P. B. Srinivas sung for Rajkumar. Rajkumar and G.K. Venkatesh too debuted as singers with this movie. It is noticeable that Narasimharaju had lip synced for Rajkumar's voice.

== Cast ==
- Rajkumar as Ohila
- Kalyan Kumar
- Narasimharaju as Shukha
- G. V. Iyer
- H. R. Shastry
- Sriranjini
- Meenakshi

== Soundtrack ==
The music of Ohileshwara was composed by G. K. Venkatesh and lyrics were written by K. R. Seetharama Sastry, and Vijaya Narasimha.

Track listing
| No. | Title | Music | Singer(s) | Length |
|---|---|---|---|---|
| 1. | "Yee Dehadinda Dooranaade" | G. K. Venkatesh | Ghantasala | 3:09 |
| 2. | "Paavana Parashiva" | G. K. Venkatesh | P. Leela, C. S. Sarojini Devi |
| 3. | "Hay Shankara Yee Dehadinda" | G. K. Venkatesh | Ghantasala | 3:00 |
| 4. | "Nee Emma Jeeva" | G. K. Venkatesh | A. P. Komala, Satyavathi |
| 5. | "Banni Baaleyare Honninaarathiya" | G. K. Venkatesh | | 3:01 |
| 6. | "Om Namaha Shivaya" | G. K. Venkatesh | Rajkumar | 3:30 |
