= Olavu Geluvu =

- Directed by: H. R. Bhargava
- Written by: Chi. Udaya Shankar; Sundar
- Screenplay by: Chi. Udaya Shankar; Sundar
- Produced by: S. A. Srinivas
- Starring: Rajkumar; Lakshmi; Balakrishna; Sampath
- Cinematography: D. V. Rajaram
- Edited by: P. Bhakthavathsalam
- Music by: G. K. Venkatesh
- Production company: Seenu Creations
- Distributed by: Seenu Creations
- Release date: 8 November 1977
- Running time: 141 min
- Country: India
- Language: Kannada

Olavu Geluvu is a 1977 Indian Kannada-language film, directed by H. R. Bhargava and produced by S. A. Srinivas. The film stars Rajkumar, Lakshmi, Balakrishna and Sampath. The film has musical score by G. K. Venkatesh.

A famous sequence from this movie - where the hero repeatedly calls a landline number but disconnects the call giving a feel of wrong connection but finally doesn't disconnect it when both the villains are into discussion - went on to be used in the 1984 Hindi movie Duniya.

== Plot ==
The lead character Rajkumar plays the role of an English professor, Mohan, in this movie. The story begins with a few fun-filled incidents that happen between him and Rohini, the most popular girl in college (played by Lakshmi). As the story unfolds, the two lead characters end up falling in love. The news of their love affair reach both the families and leads to Rohini deciding to end the relationship. Rajkumar's mentally ill brother then becomes the focus for the rest of the film.

== Cast ==
- Dr. Rajkumar as Mohan
- Lakshmi as Rohini
- Balakrishna as Narasimhaiah
- Sampath
- Thoogudeepa Srinivas
- Upasane Seetharam as Ramaswamy, Rohini's father
- Satish
- Ravi
- Tiger Prabhakar as Chintadri
- Shani Mahadevappa as Purushottam
- Bhadrachalam
- Chethan Ramarao as Raghu, Mohan's elder brother
- Jr. Shetty
- Jaikumar
- Honnavalli Krishna
- Shreemathi
- Surekha
- Sunanda
- Bhargavi
- Sridevi
- Gayathri
- Komala
- Lavanya
- Shashikala
- Vijayaleela

== Soundtrack ==
Olavu Geluvu

Soundtrack album by G. K. Venkatesh
- Label: Saregama Music

The music was composed by G. K. Venkatesh.

No.	Song	Singers	Lyrics	Length (m:ss)
1	"Na Helalare"	Dr. Rajkumar	Chi. Udaya Shankar	02:53
2	"Giniye Nanna"	Dr. Rajkumar	Chi. Udaya Shankar	03:18
3	"Nannedhe Kogileya"	S. Janaki	Chi. Udaya Shankar	03:30
4	"Sangeethave Nee Nudiyuva"	Rajkumar, S. Janaki	Chi. Udaya Shankar	03:15
