= Nanobba Kalla =

- Directed by: Dorai–Bhagavan
- Screenplay by: Chi. Udayashankar; M. D. Sundar
- Story by: Chi. Udayashankar; M. D. Sundar
- Produced by: S. Ramanathan; Shivaram
- Starring: Dr. Rajkumar; Lakshmi; Kanchana
- Cinematography: Chittibabu
- Edited by: P. Bhaktavatsalam
- Music by: Rajan–Nagendra
- Production company: Rashi Brothers
- Release date: 29 November 1979
- Country: India
- Language: Kannada

Nanobba Kalla ( transl. I am a thief) is a 1979 Indian Kannada-language action drama film directed by Dorai–Bhagavan and produced by Shivaram and S. Ramanathan under Rashi Brothers. The film stars Dr. Rajkumar in dual role and himself in a scene. The music was composed by Rajan–Nagendra, while cinematography and editing were handled by Chittibabu and P. Bhaktavatsalam.

Nanobba Kalla was released on 29 November 1979 to positive reviews from critics and became a commercial success at the box office.

This was the debut movie of actor Negro Johnny. Rajkumar who played dual roles in this movie also played dual roles in his immediate next release Ravichandra - making it the only instance in his career where he played dual roles in successive movies.

== Plot ==
Gopi, the son of DCP Chandrashekhar and Savitri, gets separated from his parents and grows up to become a criminal. When Gopi finds his parents and tries to return to them, Chandrashekhar refuses to accept him and Rukmini as his son and daughter in law, due to him being a criminal.

To make matters worse for Savitri, Chandrashekhar is determined to get Gopi dead or alive. Savitri dies of shock. At her funeral, Gopi tries to escape and his father kills him by firing a single bullet at his spine.

== Cast ==
- Dr. Rajkumar as DCP Chandrashekhar
  - Gopi, Chandrashekhar's son, a criminal
  - As himself in a programme
- Lakshmi as Rukmini
- Kanchana as Savitri
- Thoogudeepa Srinivas as Joginder
- Tiger Prabhakar as Chandru
- Shivaram
- Dheerendra Gopal as Satish
- Vajramuni
- Rajanand as Rajan
- Shakti Prasad as Shankarappa

== Soundtrack ==
The music was composed by Rajan–Nagendra, with lyrics written by Chi. Udayashankar.

Track listing
No.	Title	Singer(s)	Length
1.	"Araluthide Moha"	Dr. Rajkumar; S. Janaki	4:24
2.	"Kopavethake"	Dr. Rajkumar	4:57
3.	"Aaseyu Kaigoodithu"	Dr. Rajkumar; S. Janaki	4:43
4.	"Naanobba Kallanu"	Dr. Rajkumar	4:16
Total length:			18:20
