= Ade Kannu =

1985 film directed by Chi. Dattaraj

- Poster
- Directed by: Chi. Dattaraj
- Screenplay by: Chi. Udaya Shankar
- Story by: Wali
- Produced by: Subhadra Jawahar
- Starring: Rajkumar; Gayathri; Thoogudeepa Srinivas
- Cinematography: S. V. Srikanth
- Edited by: P. Bhaktavatsalam
- Music by: G. K. Venkatesh
- Production company: Hayavadana Movies
- Release date: 1985
- Running time: 147 minutes
- Country: India
- Language: Kannada

Ade Kannu ( transl. Same Eye) is a 1985 Indian Kannada-language psychological thriller film directed by Chi. Dattaraj. It stars Dr. Rajkumar and Gayathri. Dr. Rajkumar appeared in a dual role for the last time in his career, and this was the last movie in which Gayathri appeared in a lead role against Dr. Rajkumar. The movie was based on a Tamil stageplay. Though not a commercial failure, the theatrical business of the movie did not meet the trade expectations.

== Plot ==
Jagannath Rao is the rich owner of the Kamala coffee estate, ably supported by his friend Mahesh. He had earlier joined the estate in the position of the manager, falling in love with Mahesh's sister Kamala and eventually marrying her and begetting a son Gopinath aka Gopi, who is a car rally enthusiast. When Gopi is away participating in a rally, he receives a telegram that his mother is seriously ill and reaches home only to find out that she met with a car accident and has been buried. He finds it hard to believe this, as his mother was an excellent driver herself, and the one who taught him how to drive a car. There are no convincing answers on what happened from either Mahesh or from the household cook Ramayya.

As days pass, Jagannath Rao gets increasingly depressed at Kamala's death, and becomes a recluse. Gopi is unable to understand what his father is really worrying about. Eventually, an Inspector Shridhar arrives at the estate, stating that he has been deputed to investigate Kamala's death, and that her death may not be a car crash after all. The turquoise-coloured cat-like eyes of Sridhar scares Jagannath, who begins to have hallucinations of those eyes repeatedly. Sridhar keeps visiting from time to time and befriends Gopi as well, but Jagannath gets more and more strange in his behavior and becomes a recluse.

One day, Ramayya goes missing and Sridhar too gets killed in an accident. During this time, Gopi meets with an accident too, and loses his eyesight, and Sridhar's eyes are transplanted to him. When Gopi returns home, Jagannath just cannot bear to look at him, and becomes increasingly unstable and delirious whenever he sees the eyes of Gopi. Eventually, Gopi reveals that he used coloured contact lenses to get his father to open up as to why he is so scared of the eyes. It is then revealed that during an argument with Kamala, Jagannath had slapped her, and died from internal hemorrhage. They place her body in the car and push it over the cliff to prevent anyone from knowing. It is also revealed that Jagannath had killed Ramayya as well as Sridhar. Unable to manage the situation in guilt for a situation he cannot manage. Jagannath loses his sanity and commits suicide by driving over the cliff.

== Cast ==
- Dr. Rajkumar as Jagannath Rao & Gopi
- Gayathri as Kamala, Jagannath Rao's wife and Gopi's mother
- Thoogudeepa Srinivas as Mahesh, Kamala's brother
- Sathish as Inspector
- Shani Mahadevappa as Ramayya, A Cook in Jagannath Rao's House
- Sudheer
- Vijayaranjini as Sujatha, Gopi's love interest
- Uma Shivakumar as Sarala, Sujatha's sister
- Bhatti Mahadevappa as Ramaswamy, Mahesh's and Kamala's father
- Vadiraj as Sujatha and Sarala's father

== Production ==
When Rajkumar offered his callsheet to Vadiraj to produce a movie, he decided to adapt a Tamil stageplay penned by Vaali after watching its 2-episode teleserial adaptation on DD Tamil. Actor Sathish who played the role of the inspector in the movie had played the son's character in the serial. Being the last movie of Rajkumar in dual roles, it also marked the last movie where P.B. Srinivas and Rajkumar sang together. This was also the last movie where G.K. Venkatesh composed music for a movie starring Rajkumar in lead role.

== Soundtrack ==
The music and background score was composed by G. K. Venkatesh and the lyrics were penned by Chi. Udaya Shankar.

Ade Kannu

Soundtrack album by G. K. Venkatesh
- Released: 1985
- Genre: Feature Film
- Length: 18:14
- Language: Kannada
- Label: MRT Music
- Director: G. K. Venkatesh

G. K. Venkatesh chronology
Rakasi Nagu (1985)	Ade Kannu (1985)	Chaduranga (1985)

No.	Title	Singer(s)	Length
1.	"Ade Kannu"	Dr.Rajkumar	2:44
2.	"Nayana Nayana"	Dr.Rajkumar, Bangalore Latha	4:39
3.	"Ide Nota Ide Aata"	Dr.Rajkumar, Vani Jairam	5:15
4.	"Ninnee Naguve"	Dr.Rajkumar, Dr.P B Sreenivas	4:45
5.	"Sree Manohara"		37
Total length:			18:14
