= Thrimurthy =

- VCD cover
- Directed by: C. V. Rajendran
- Written by: C. V. Rajendran
- Screenplay by: M. D. Sundar
- Produced by: Parvathamma Rajkumar; S. P. Nagamma
- Starring: Rajkumar; Jayamala; Sampath; Vajramuni
- Cinematography: Srikanth
- Edited by: P. Bhakthavathsalam
- Music by: G. K. Venkatesh
- Distributed by: Poornima Enterprises
- Release date: 1975
- Country: India
- Language: Kannada

Thrimurthy is a 1975 Indian Kannada-language anthology thriller film, directed by C. V. Rajendran and produced by Parvathamma Rajkumar and S. P. Nagamma. The film stars Rajkumar, Jayamala, Sampath, T. N. Balakrishna and Vajramuni. The film is divided into 3 stories – Thrimurthy, Undoo Hoda Kondoo Hoda and Aalaagaballava Arasaagaballa. Rajkumar as main protagonist Sridhar plays three different roles in them — police inspector Vijay, hippie Shekhar and servant Sheshagiri. The film has musical score by G. K. Venkatesh. The movie was the debut movie of Tamil director C. V. Rajendran in Kannada. The movie was Parvathamma's first production venture under Poornima Enterprises banner. It was also her maiden distribution venture. The movie was a huge success.

== Plot ==
=== Thrimurthy ===
Mahadevayya is a businessman who has lost his wealth by gambling. He approaches his friend, Rajaram, on the day of his only daughter Prema's birthday party to ask for a sum of Rupees two lakhs. When Rajaram refuses, Mahadevayya threatens dire consequences. On the same day, Rajaram's nephew Shrikanth threatens to take his life if he is not married to Prema within a week's time.

After the party ends, Rajaram receives an anonymous phone call with a threat. CID Inspector Vijay, claiming that he has been sent to solve the mystery arrives at Rajaram's house. Vijay develops a liking for Prema. When Rajaram receives more threatening phone calls, Vijay reveals that the prime suspects are Mahadevayya, Shrikanth and Rajaram's servant. On the night when Rajaram is to give the ransom, Vijay asks the family to lock themselves in the bedroom and only come out the next morning. The next morning they come out to see the servant tied up. They find a notice from Vijay, who reveals that he was responsible for the confusion and that he has fled with some important documents.

=== Undoo Hoda Kondoo Hoda ===
A successful businessman from Mercara, Seetharamaiah, is blackmailed by a hippie Shekhar who is the brother of Shakuntala who is pregnant with Seetharamaiah's illegitimate child. Shekhar forces him to grant a monthly salary of Rupees 2,500 in addition to a comfortable stay in his house as his multi-millionaire friend's son. Seetharamaiah's wife is impressed by Shekhar, and wants him to marry their only daughter Bhaama. Shekhar find out that Bhaama however loves a professor from Mysore and asks her to consider him as an older brother. Shekhar persuades her to take him to Mysore. Knowing that Bhaama has developed an immense fear for knives, he uses one to make her unconscious and kidnaps her.

=== Aalaagaballava Arasaagaballa ===
Sridhar, the elder son of a widowed landlord, runs away from home after being harshly punished by his father. The landlord remarries to ensure maternal affection for his younger son, Giridhar. Years later, Sridhar returns as a spoilt young man and shows no respect for his step-mother, Savitri. Sridhar fights with his brother for property. Sridhar is stabbed to death and Giridhar is arrested since the knife has his fingerprints. The court awards him the death sentence. Savitri relocates to Bangalore where she runs into Seshgiri, an old servant of her husband. They receive a letter from a woman named Rani who claims to be Sridhar's wife.

Savitri's brother is Seetharamaiah who is upset over his daughter's disappearance. He is surprised to find out that the woman claiming to be Rani is Shakuntala, whom he had molested a few years back but doesn't reveal the truth after she secretly informs him that Bhaama is in her custody. Seetharam goes to Shakuntala's house where he meets Shekhar. Bhaama refuses to go with her father believing he killed Sridhar. In a flashback it is revealed that whoever threw a knife at Sridhar was supervised by Seetharam. Upon returning to his house Seetharamaiah realizes that Seshgiri resembles Shekhar. He calls his elder brother Rajaram who is shocked at the similarity that between Seshgiri and Inspector Vijay.

The brothers hire goons to kidnap Rani (Shakuntala) but they wrongly kidnap Prema. Rajaram receives an anonymous call informing him of Prema's location and goes there with some goons. They are greeted by Vijay who bashes the goons. Prema accuses her father for his involvement in Sridhar's murder. Vijay reveals he is in charge of Sridhar's case. Returning to his house, Rajaram and Seetharamaiah raid Seshgiri's room and get proofs that Vijay, Shekhar and Seshgiri are three roles played by a single person. They assign Shrikanth to murder him. Seshgiri defeats the goons who attack and takes Savitri to the house where Rani, Bhaama and Prema secretly reside and reveals that he is the real Sridhar. In a flashback it is revealed that while in Delhi, Sridhar came across a newspaper article about the arrest of Giridhar and Sridhar's murder forcing him to return to Bangalore to solve the mystery. He discovers that Kamalakar was the fake Sridhar and Shakuntala is Kamalakar's sister.

Back to the present, Sridhar gets the culprits punished and Giridhar is released and unites with his family.

== Cast ==
- Rajkumar as Sridhar/ Vijay/ Shekhar/ Sheshagiri
- Jayamala as Prema
- M. V. Rajamma as Savitri, Sridhar's mother
- Sureka as Bhaama
- G. V. Sharada as Rani/Shakuntala
- Sampath as Rajaram, Savitri's brother
- T. N. Balakrishna as Seetharamaiah, Savitri's brother
- Vajramuni as Shrikanth
- Thoogudeepa Srinivas as Sridhar/Kamalakar
- M. N. Lakshmi Devi as Seetharamaiah's wife
- Shani Mahadevappa
- Bheema Rao
- Mahadevappa
- Indiradevi
- Pushpa
- Joker Shyam

== Soundtrack ==
The music was composed by G. K. Venkatesh.

No.	Song	Singers	Lyrics	Length (m:ss)
1	"Eanu Maadali"	Rajkumar	Chi. Udaya Shankar	03:00
2	"Eako Na Manasothenu"	S. Janaki	Chi. Udaya Shankar	03:28
3	"Le Le Appana Magale"	Rajkumar	Chi. Udaya Shankar	03:27
4	"Moogana Kaadidarenu"	Rajkumar	Chi. Udaya Shankar	03:27
5	"Hannu Maagide"	Rajkumar, S. Janaki	Chi. Udaya Shankar	04:10
