= Malli Maduve =

- Directed by: G. R. Nathan
- Written by: Hunsur Krishnamurthy; Kanagal Prabhakara Shastry
- Story by: C. N. Annadurai
- Starring: Rajkumar; Udaykumar; Rajashankar; K. S. Ashwath
- Cinematography: G. R. Nathan
- Edited by: K. Govinda Swamy
- Music by: G. K. Venkatesh
- Production company: Jupiter Pictures Ltd.
- Distributed by: Jupiter Pictures Ltd.
- Release date: 14 May 1963
- Country: India
- Language: Kannada

Malli Maduve is a 1963 Indian Kannada-language film directed by G. R. Nathan. The film stars Rajkumar, Udaykumar, Rajashankar and K. S. Ashwath and has a musical score composed by G. K. Venkatesh. The film was a remake of 1949 Tamil film Velaikaari which was based on the play of the same name written by C. N. Annadurai incorporating plot details from the Alexandre Dumas novel The Count of Monte Cristo (1844). Rajkumar plays a dual role, with the second character making a brief appearance of just three seconds on-screen, contributing to an important plot revelation.

== Cast ==
- Rajkumar as Ananda and Paramananda (dual roles)
- Udaykumar
- Rajashankar
- K. S. Ashwath
- Narasimharaju
- Sahukar Janaki
- Leelavathi
- Meenakumari
- Ramadevi
- Papamma
- Jorge Indra
- Ganapathi Bhat
- Kupparaj
- Krishna Shastry
- Girimaji
- M. Shivaji
- Srikanth
- Satyam

== Soundtrack ==
The music was composed by G. K. Venkatesh who also was a co-singer for a song.

No.	Song	Singers	Lyrics	Length (m:ss)
1	"Madhuve Yemba Santhege"	P. Susheela	Ku. Ra. Seetharam Shastry	03:13
2	"Mahaapurushare Preraka Shakti"	S. Janaki	Ku. Ra. Seetharam Shastry	02:08
3	"Mangana Moreya Mudi Moosangi"	S. Janaki	Ku. Ra. Seetharam Shastry	04:15
4	"Naguve Naaka Aluve Naraka"	P. B. Srinivas, G. K. Venkatesh	Ku. Ra. Seetharam Shastry	03:38
5	"Nanna Ninna Sallapavella"	S. Janaki	Ku. Ra. Seetharam Shastry	03:16
6	"Olavanthe Geluvanthe"	P. Susheela, P. B. Srinivas,	Ku. Ra. Seetharam Shastry	03:55
