= Daari Tappida Maga =

- DVD cover
- Directed by: Peketi Sivaram
- Written by: Chi. Udaya Shankar
- Produced by: Peketi Sivaram
- Starring: Rajkumar; M.V. Rajamma; Kalpana; Aarathi; Manjula; Jayamala
- Cinematography: R. Madhusudan
- Edited by: P. Bhaktavatsalam
- Music by: G. K. Venkatesh
- Production company: Jayaprabha Productions
- Distributed by: KCN Movies
- Release date: 28 February 1975
- Running time: 156 minutes
- Country: India
- Language: Kannada

Daari Tappida Maga ( transl. The Wayward Son) is a 1975 Indian Kannada-language drama film produced and directed by Peketi Sivaram. The film stars Dr. Rajkumar in a dual role, alongside Kalpana, Aarathi, Manjula, Jayamala, K. S. Ashwath, M. V. Rajamma and Vajramuni. The music was composed by G. K. Venkatesh, while cinematography and editing were handled by R. Madhusudan and P. Bhaktavatsalam.

Daari Tappida Maga was released on 28 February 1975 and became a commercial success and by completing 175 days run in theatres. Rajkumar's second son Raghavendra appeared in a small role in his second on-screen appearance as a child artist after Sri Srinivasa Kalyana (1974). Despite being dubbed in Malayalam as Kollakkaran, the film was remade as Manushya Mrugam. It was also the first Kannada film to be shot at the Oberoi hotel in Mumbai.

== Plot ==
Prakash alias Prashanth and Prasad are twins who have been separated since childhood in July 1947. Prasad is a college professor living a peaceful life with his mother and wife Pramila, while Prashanth is a master thief. Prashanth befriends Radha and lives with her for a few days, but later cheats her. Prashanth and his partner Ashok steals diamonds while disguised as CBI officers. The police commissioner appoints the CBI to investigate. Raju, Prasad's friend and a CBI officer, takes the case and begins the investigation. Prashanth commits another heist disguised as a film crew and they also commit a robbery in the house of Princess of Bundelpur while disguised as swamijis.

Raju receives information about the incidents and inquires from Radha about Prashanth. Prashanth accidentally arrives at Prasad's home, where he is caught by Prasad and his mother and soon learns about his real identity as Prakash. Prashanth stays in their home, while Raju learns that Prakash is behind all incidents. Through Radha and Raju, Prasad learns about Prashanth's crimes and decides to punish him. Prasad and Prashanth quarrel with each other, but their mother stops them and she learns the truth. She states that Prasad and Prakash are like two eyes to her and she does not want to lose them.

Prashanth changes his mind due to his mother's words and decides to leave the city. Prasad confronts him and Ashok, who learns about Prashanth from Radha, arrives to take Prashanth with them and is shocked to see the twins. Prashanth calls him and decides to go with Ashok. Prasad tries to stop Prashanth, but Ashok beats him. An enraged Prashanth thrashes Ashok for beating Prasad. A quarrel starts between them in which the CBI and police arrive and kill Ashok. Prashanth is shot while attempting to escape and dies in front of Prasad and his family.

== Cast ==
- Rajkumar as Prakash "Prashanth"/Prasad
- Kalpana as Pramila: Prasad's wife
- Aarathi as Radha Devi: Prashanth's love interest
- Manjula as Pushpa: Pramila's sister
- Jayamala as Princess of Bundelpur
- M. V. Rajamma as Prakash and Prasad's mother
- K. S. Ashwath as D. C. Raju: an officer with the CID
- Vajramuni as Ashok: Prashanth's accomplice
- Rajashankar
- Sampath as Police Commissioner of Bengaluru
- T. N. Balakrishna as Prasad's father-in-law
- Thoogudeepa Srinivas
- Raghavendra Rajkumar as Kitty
- B. Jaya as Pankaja
- Honnavalli Krishna
- Shani Mahadevappa as Police Commissioner of Bombay
- Chi. Sadashivaiah as school teacher

== Soundtrack ==
The music was composed by G. K. Venkatesh. He reused the tune of "Kannanchina Ee Maatali" from this movie as "Oka Venuvu Vinipinchenu" for the 1976 Telugu movie America Ammayi directed by Singeetam Srinivasa Rao.

Daari Tappida Maga

Soundtrack album by G. K. Venkatesh
- Released: 1975
- Genre: Feature film soundtrack
- Label: Universal music

Track listing
No.	Title	Lyrics	Singer(s)	Length
1.	"Kannanchina Ee Mathali"	R. N. Jayagopal	P. B. Sreenivas
2.	"Haayada Ee Vele"	R N Jayagopal	P. B. Sreenivas, S. Janaki
3.	"Krishna Murari - Naariya Seere Kadda"	Chi. Udaya Shankar	Rajkumar
4.	"Kaapadu Sri Satyanarayana"	Vijaya Narasimha	P. B. Sreenivas, S. Janaki, A. P. Komala
