= List of Kannada films of the 1950s =

The list of Kannada feature films released by the Kannada film Industry located in Bangalore, Karnataka in the 1950s.

== Top-grossing films ==
Rank	Year	Title	Collection	Ref.
1.	1959	Mahishasura Mardini	₹1 crore (₹80.25 crore in 2025)	
2.	1958	Bhookailasa	₹80 lakh (₹61.36 crore in 2025)	
3.	1958	Shree Krishna Garudi	₹60 lakh (₹43.5 crore in 2025)	
4.	1958	School Master	₹50 lakh (₹63.2 crore in 2025)	
4.	1954	Bedara Kannappa	₹50 lakh (₹63.2 crore in 2025)	
5.	1951	Jaganmohini	₹25 lakh (₹53.8 crore in 2025)	
6.	1953	Gunasagari	₹10 lakh (₹13.62 crore in 2025)	

== 1950 ==
Film	Director	Cast	Music director	Producer	Banner
Shaneeshwara Mahatme	Kempraj Urs	Kemparaj Urs, M. V. Rajamma, Pandari Bai, B. Jayamma, M. S. Subanna	S. Rajam		Kempraj Productions
Shiva Parvathi	T. Janakiram	Kemparaj Urs, Sumathi, Kashinath, Prathima Devi, Shantha	B. Dayanidhi	Hunsur Krishnamurthy	Chitravani Productions

== 1951 ==
Film	Director	Cast	Music director	Producer	Banner
Jaganmohini	D. Shankar Singh	Harini, Prathima Devi, Jayashri, Srinivasarao, Mahabalarao, Makeup Subanna	P. Shyamanna		Mahathma Pictures
Thilothamme	R. M. Veerabadraiah	Veerbadrappa, Jayashri, G. R. Saindo			Sukhsampath and Chitrapatt

== 1952 ==
Film	Director	Cast	Music director	Producer	Banner
Sri Srinivasa Kalyana	D. Shankar Singh; B. Vittalacharya	Vimalananda Das, Prathima Devi, Rajkumar, M N Lakshmi	P. Shyamanna	D. Shankar Singh; B. Vittalacharya	Mahathama Pictures

== 1953 ==
Film	Director	Cast	Music director	Producer	Banner
Chanchal Kumari	D. Shankar Singh	Indu Shekar, Prathima Devi, Rajendra Singh Babu	P. Shyamanna		Mahathama Pictures
Dalalli	D. Shankar Singh	Sampath, Subbanna, Harini, Balakrishna, Mahabalarao	P. Shyamanna		Mahathama Pictures
Jathaka Phala	R. Nagendra Rao	Nagendra, Sarangapaani, T. K. Balachandran, Suryakala, Kamalabai	R. Govardhanam		R. N. R. Pictures
Gunasagari	H. L. N. Simha	Honnappa Bhagavathar, Pandari Bai, Gubbi Veeranna, T. S. Balaiah, B. Jayamma, K. Kumari	R. Sudharsanam	Gubbi Veeranna, C. R. Basavaraju	Gubbi Karnataka Productions
Mangala Gowri	T. R. Sundaram	Indu Shekar, Harini			Modern Theatres
Srikrishna	C. V. Raju	Kemparaj Urs, Marirai, Usha Bellar Lalitha, Rathnamala, Nagarathna			B. M. Ashwath Productions
Sowbhagya Lakshmi	B. Vittalacharya	Harini, Indu Shekar, Balakrishna, M. N. Lakshmi Devi	Rajan–Nagendra	B. Vittalacharya	Mahathma Pictures

== 1954 ==
Film	Director	Cast	Music director	Producer	Banner
Bedara Kannappa	H. L. N. Simha	Rajkumar, Pandari Bai, Rajasulochana, G. V. Iyer, T. R. Narasimharaju, H. R. Shasthry	R. Sudharsanam		Gubbi Karnataka Films
Devakannikaa	B. R. Rao	Indu Shekar, Sowcar Janaki, Balakrishna			Modern Theatres
Kanyadana	B. Vittalacharya	Harini, Balakrishna, Indushekar			Vittal Production
Jaladurga	Kempraju Urs	Kemparaj Urs, Krishnakumari, B. R. Panthulu, Jayalakshmi			Kempraj Productions
Madiddunnu Maharaya	D. Shankar Singh	Hunsur Krishnamurthy, Harini, Prathima, Revathi, Sampath			Mahathma Pictures
Muttidella Chinna	D. Shankar Singh	Balakrishna, Harini, Prathima Devi			Mahathma Pictures
Natasekhara	C. V. Raju	Kalyan Kumar, Vidya, Sandhya, Jayasree, G. Goggu	M. Venkataraju		Jai Raj Films
Rajalakshmi	B. Vittalacharya	Sampath, Revathy			Vittal Productions

== 1955 ==
Film	Director	Cast	Music director	Banner
Aadarsha Sathi	Chitrapu Narayana Murthy	R. Nagendra Rao, Jamuna, Sowcar Janaki, T. R. Narasimharaju	R. Sudarsanam, R. Govardhanam	AVM Productions
Aashadaboothi	D. Shankar Singh	B. Saroja Devi, Sampath, Balakrishna	P. Shyamanna	Mahatma Pictures
Bhakta Mallikarjuna	C. V. Raju	T. R. Narasimharaju, Pandari Bai, Amarnath, G. V. Iyer, Balakrishna	C. N. Pandurangan	Jairaj Productions
Gandarva Kanya	D. Shankar Singh	Rajasulochana, Revathi, Harini, Indushekar, Veerabadrappa, Rajendra Singh Babu	P. Shyamanna	Mahatma Pictures
Mahakavi Kalidasa	K. R. Seetharama Sastry	Honnappa Bhagavathar, G. V. Iyer, B. Saroja Devi, Raghavendra Rao, T. R. Narasimharaju	C. Honnappa Bhagavathar	Lalithakala Films
Modala Thedi	P. Neelakantan	B. R. Panthulu, M. V. Rajamma, M. Mahadavarao, Master Hirannaiah, C. Sadashivaiah, Sivaji Ganesan	T. G. Lingappa	Padmini Pictures
Santha Sakku	Krishnan–Panju	B. Hanumanthachar, Pandari Bai, Vimalanandadas, M. Prabhakar, Annapoorna	G. Govindarajulu Naidu	Sri Panduranga Productions
Shivasharane Nambiyakka	D. Shankar Singh	K. S. Ashwath, Prathima, Balakrishna, Babu	P. Shyamanna	Mahatma Pictures
Shivasharane Nambekka	P. Neelakantan	M. V. Rajamma, B. R. Panthulu, Dikki Madhava Rao, Revathi	T. G. Lingappa	Padmini Pictures
Sodari	T. V. Singh Tagore	Rajkumar, Pandari Bai, Jayasri, Raghavendrarao, G. V. Iyer, K. S. Ashwath, Sandhya, N. S. Krishnan, Kowshik, Vidya	H. R. Padmanabha Sasthri, G. K. Venkatesh, P. Srinivas Iyengar	Viswakala Chitra
Srirama Pooja	B. R. Krishnamurthy	Sandhya, B. Saroja Devi, Rajendra Krishna, B. K. Eshwarappa	Vijaya Bhaskar	B. R. K. Films
Stree Rathna	K. Subramaniyam	K. S. Ashwath, Sandhya, N. S. Krishnan, Kowshik, Vidya	Srinivas Iyengar	Lokeshwari Films
Vichitra Prapancha	Baalagajaber	Harini, Vasudeva Girimaji, Indushekar, Shanthakumar, Soorat Ashwath	S. Purshothaam	Vijayasri Chitra

== 1956 ==
Film	Director	Cast	Music director	Producer	Banner
Bhagyachakra	Y. V. Rao	Kalyan Kumar, Sowkar Janaki	Vijaya Bhaskar		Chitra Bharathi
Bhagyodaya	P. V. Babu	Udayakumar, Kowshik, T. R. Narasimharaju	L. Malleshwara Rao		Udaya Productions
Bhakta Markandeya	B. S. Ranga	R. Nagendra Rao, Nagaiah, Pushpavalli, T. R. Narasimharaju, Ramadevi, Padmini Priyadarshini	Viswanathan–Ramamoorthy		Vikram Productions
Bhakta Vijaya	Aaruru Pattabhi	Rajkumar, Mynavathi, Pandari Bai	Shyam-Aathmanath		Jaganath Productions
Daiva Sankalpa	M. B. Ganesh	Udayakumar, Balakrishna, Master Hirannaiah, Rajakumari, H. P. Saroja, Lakshmidevi	P. Shyamanna		Mahatham Pictures
Hari Bhakta	T. V. Singh Tagore	Rajkumar, Pandari Bai, Mynavathi, T. R. Narasimharaju, G. V. Iyer, H. R. Shastry	G. K. Venkatesh		Viswakala Chitra
Kacha Devayani	K. Subramaniyam	K. S. Ashwath, B. Saroja Devi	Pandu, Meenakshi Subramanyam		Morak Pictures
Kokilavaani	Natarajan	K. S. Ashwath, B. Saroja Devi, Musurikrishnamurthy	G. Ramanathan		Nayaki Art Production
Mutthaide Bhagya	B. Vittalacharya	Hunsur Krishnamurthy, Kalyan Kumar, Mynavathi, Balakrishna, Master Hirannaiah, Revathi, Jayasri	Rajan–Nagendra		Vital Production
Ohileshwara	T. V. Singh Tagore	Rajkumar, Kalyan Kumar, T. R. Narasimharaju, H. R. Shastri, Pandari Bai, Sriranjini, G. V. Iyer, Meenakshi	G. K. Venkatesh		Viswakala Chitra
Pancharathna	K. Vembu, KCK	Honnappa Bhagavathar, B. Saroja Devi, Balakrishna, T. R. Narasimharaju, Udayakumar	C. Honnappa Bhagavathar		Lalithakala Films
Renuka Mahatme	Y. R. Swamy	R. Nagendra Rao, Pandari Bai, T. R. Narasimharaju	H. R. Padmanabha Sashtri		Rohini Films
Sadaarame	K. R. Seetharama Sastry	Gubbi Veeranna, T. R. Narasimharaju, Kalyan Kumar, Kowshik, G. V. Iyer, Balakrishna, Sowcar Janaki	R. Sudharsanam, R. Govardhanam		Shankar Production

== 1957 ==
Film	Director	Cast	Music director	Producer	Banner
Bettada Kalla	S. M. Sriramulu Naidu	Kalyan Kumar, Mynavathi, R. Nagendra Rao, Uday Kumar, Ramadevi	S. M. Subbaiah Naidu		Pakshiraja Studios
Chintamani	Kotnies	K. S. Ashwath, B. Saroja Devi, T. R. Narasimharaju			Lokeshwari Pictures
Mahiravana	G. Nataraj	R. Nagendra Rao, Kantharao, Balakrishna, Meenakshi			Tripura Films
Naladamayanthi	Kempraj Urs	Kempraj Urs, Ganapathi Bhatt, P. Bhanumathi, T. R. Narasimharaju	B. Gopalam		Kempraj Productions
Prabhulinga Leele	Sri. Manjunatha	Prathima Devi, T. R. Narasimharaju, Harini, K. S. Ashwath	P. Shyamanna		Madukeshwara Films
Premada Putri	R. Nagendra Rao	R. Nagendra Rao, Kalyan Kumar, Udaykumar, Sandhya, Sriranjini, Suryakala	H. R. Padmanabha Sasthri, Vijaya Bhaskar		RNR Pictures
Rathnagiri Rahasya	B. R. Panthulu	Udaykumar, Jamuna, T. R. Ramachandran, B. R. Panthulu, M. V. Rajamma	T. G. Lingappa		Padmini Pictures
Rayara Sose	R. Ramamurthy, K. S. Murthy	Rajkumar, Pandari Bai, Kalyan Kumar, Mynavathi	R. Dewakara		Sri Panduranga Productions
Sati Nalaayini	T. R. S. Gopu	Rajkumar, Pandari Bai			Kamadenu Films
Shukradese	Aaruru Pattabhi	Balakrishna, Adavaani, Lakshmidevi, Suryakala, Ramadevi	T. A. Kalyanam		Jaganatha Productions
Varadakshine	Chandra Mohan	Udaykumar, Suryakala, T. R. Narasimharaju	P. Shyamanna		Venkateshwara Productions

== 1958 ==
Film	Director	Cast	Music director	Producer	Banner
Anna Thangi	Ku. Ra. C. Shastri	Rajkumar, B. Saroja Devi, Balakrishna, Eshwarappa, Jayamma, Vidhya, K. S. Ashwath, T. R. Narasimharaju			Girija Productions
Bhakta Prahlada	M. S. Subbiaha Naidu, H. S. Krishnaswamy	Subbiaha Naidu, Udaykumar, K. S. Ashwath, Master. Lokesh, Leelavathi, Lakshmi Bhai			S. S. S. Nataka Mandali
Bhookailasa	K. Shankar	Rajkumar, Kalyan Kumar, Jamuna, B. Saroja Devi, K. S. Ashwath	R. Sudharsanam, R. Govardhanam		AVM Productions
Mane Thumbida Hennu	B. V. Acharya	Udaykumar, Advani Lakshmi Devi, Lalitha Rao, Balakrishna, T. R. Narasimharaju			Vittal Productions
Mangalya Yoga	P. K. Lal	Leelavathi, Balakrishna			Pushpanjali Pictures
School Master	B. R. Panthulu	B. R. Panthulu, M. V. Rajamma, Udayakumar, Sowcar Janaki, B. Saroja Devi	T. G. Lingappa		Padmini Pictures
Shree Krishna Gaarudi	Hunsur Krishnamurthy	Rajkumar, Sidhia Swamy, Suryakala, Revathi, T. R. Narasimharaju			Nandi Pictures

== 1959 ==
Film	Director	Cast	Music director	Producer	Banner
Abba Aa Hudugi	H. L. N. Simha	Rajkumar, Pandari Bai, Mynavathi, Rajashankar, B. R. Panthulu, M. V. Rajamma, T. R. Narasimharaju			Jamuna Productions
Dharma Vijaya	N. Jaganath	Rajkumar, Leelavathi, Harini, T. R. Narasimharaju, Varadappa			H. M. Baba Production
Jagajyothi Basveshwara	T. V. Singh Tagore	Rajkumar, Honnappa Bhagavathar, Sandhya, B. Saroja Devi, Leelavathi, Balakrishna, Iyer			Shashikala Chitra
Mahishasura Mardini	B. S. Ranga	Rajkumar, Udaykumar, Sowcar Janaki, T. R. Narasimharaju, Sandhya, K. S. Ashwath, Ganapahti Bhat			Vikram Production
Manege Banda Mahalakshmi	B. V. Acharya, Govindhiah	Kalyan Kumar, Revathi, K. S. Ashwath			Manjunatha productions
Mangala Suthra	Chandra Mohan	Surya Kala, Balakrishna, Advani Lakshmidevi, Prathima Bhagwan			Venkateswara Productions

== See also ==
- Kannada cinema
