= List of Kannada films of 1968 =

== Top-grossing films ==
Rank	Title	Collection	Ref.
1.	Jedara Bale	₹90 lakh (₹54.2 crore in 2025)	
2.	Goa Dalli CID 999	₹70 lakh (₹37.8 crore in 2025)	

== List ==
The following is a list of films produced in the Kannada film industry in India in 1968, presented in alphabetical order.

Title	Director	Cast	Music director	Producer
Aananda Kanda	A. C. Narasimha	Kalyan Kumar, Kalpana, Mynavathi	Vijaya Bhaskar	A. C. Narasimha
Arunodaya	C. Srinivasan	Kalyan Kumar, Rajashree, Sowkar Janaki	R. Sudarshanam	T. N. Srinivasan
Adda Dari	Hunsur Krishnamurthy	Hunsur Krishnamurthy, Dwarakish, B. M. Venkatesh	Rajan–Nagendra	Hunusur Krishnamurthy
Amma	B. R. Panthulu	Rajkumar, B. R. Panthulu, Bharathi	T. G. Lingappa	B. R. Panthulu
Attegondu Kaala Sosegandu Kala	Y. R. Swamy	Kalyan Kumar, B. V. Radha, Leelavathi	Satyam	N. N. Bhat
Anna Thamma	K. S. L. Swamy	Kalyan Kumar, Kalpana, Leelavathi	Vijaya Bhaskar	N. B. Vatsalan
Bedi Bandavalu	C. Srinivasan	Kalyan kumar, Chandrakala, Chandrakala	R. Sudarshanam	T. N. Srinivasan
Bangalore Mail	L. S. Narayana	Rajkumar, Jayanthi, Narasimharaju	Satyam	Y. V. Rao
Bhagya Devathe	Ratnakar-Madhu	Rajkumar, K. S. Ashwath, Leelavathi	Gyanamani	V. Sundareshan
Bhagyada Bagilu	K. S. L. Swamy	Rajkumar, Vandana, Dwarakish	Vijaya Bhaskar	Jayanna
Chinnari Puttanna	B. R. Panthulu	B. R. Panthulu, Ramesh, Vandana	T. G. Lingappa	B. R. Panthulu
Dhoomakethu	R. N. Jayagopal	Rajkumar, Udaya Kumar, Udhayachandrika	T. G. Lingappa	S. N. Pal
Gandhinagara	K. S. L. Swamy	Rajkumar, Jayashree, Kalpana	Satyam	C. Venkaa-Bhava
Goa Dalli CID 999	S. K. Bhagavan	Rajkumar, Lakshmi, Narasimharaju	G. K. Venkatesh	S. K. Bhagawan
Gowri Ganda	Sundar Rao	Narasimharaju, Mynavathi, Rajaashankar	Tarai Ganesh	Sundar Rao
Hannele Chiguridaga	M. R. Vittal	Rajkumar, R. Nagendra Rao, Kalpana	M. Ranga Rao	Srikanth Nahata
Hoovu Mullu	A. V. Sheshagiri Rao	Udaya Kumar, Balakrishna, Kalpana	Satyam	A. L. Abbaya
Jedara Bale	B. Dorairaj	Rajkumar, Udaya Kumar, Jayanthi	G. K. Venkatesh	T. P. Venugopal
Lakshaadheeswara	S. N. Singh	Dinesh, Dikki Madava Rao, Shylashree	Satyam	Rajendra Singh Babu
Maatheye Maha mandira	B. C. Srinivas	Udaya Kumar, Jayanthi, B. M. Venkatesh	B. Gopal	N. S. Mani
Mahasathi Arundathi	Aaruru Pattabhi	Rajkumar, Arun Kumar, Kalpana	Ashwathaama	B. V. Reddy
Mamathe	Y. R. Swamy	Kalyan Kumar, Vandana, Leelavathi	Satyam	Smt. S. Heera
Manassakshi	S. K. A. Chari	Rajkumar, Narasimharaju, M. P. Shankar	G. K. Venkatesh	A. L. Srinivasan
Manku Dinne	K. S. L. Swamy	Kalyan Kumar, Vandana, Jayashree	Vijaya Bhaskar	A. M. Samiulla
Mannina Maga	Geethapriya	Rajkumar, Kalpana, M. P. Shankar	Vijaya Bhaskar	M. V. Venkatachalam
Mysore Tanga	G. V. Iyer	Kalyan Kumar, Vandana, Balakrishna	Vijaya Bhaskar	B. Vijayalakshmi
Naane Bhagyavati	T. V. Singh Thakur	Kalyan Kumar, Udaya Kumar, Mynavathi	T. G. Lingappa	M. Sampath
Namma Ooru	C. V. Shiva Shankar	Rajesh, Dinesh, Shylashree	R. Ratna	Begur Satya Narayan, Late Shri S. N. Rao, Late Shri J. N. Shetty
Nata Sarvabhouma	Aaruru Pattabhai	Rajkumar	Vijaya Bhaskar	
Pravasi Mandira	Kalyan Kumar	Kalyan Kumar, Vandana, R. N. Sudarshan	Rajan–Nagendra	Kalyan Kumar
Rowdy Ranganna	R. Ramamurthy	Rajkumar, Rajashankar, Balakrishna	Satyam	R. Ramamurthy
Sarvamangala	Chaduranga	Rajkumar, Kalpana, K. S. Ashwath	Satyam	Smt. Doddammanni
Simha Swapna	W. R. Subba Rao	Rajkumar, Udaya Kumar, Jayanthi	Susarla Dakshinamurthy	S. Bhavanarayan

== See also ==
- Kannada films of 1967
- Kannada films of 1969
