= List of Kannada films of 1962 =

== Top-grossing films ==
Rank	Title	Collection	Ref.
1.	Rathna Manjari	₹35 lakh (₹30.46 crore in 2025)	
2.	Bhoodana	₹30 lakh (₹21.33 crore in 2025)	
3.	Vidhi Vilasa	₹20 lakh (₹18.07 crore in 2025)	

== List ==
The following is a list of films produced in the Kannada film industry in India in 1962, presented in alphabetical order.

Title	Director	Cast	Music director	Producer
Bhoodana	G. V. Iyer	Rajkumar, Kalyan Kumar, Leelavathi	G. K. Venkatesh	P. N. Gopalakrishna
Daiva Leele	C. S. Krishna	Kalyan Kumar, Balakrishna, Sowkar Janaki	B. M. S. Murthy	R. T. Arasu
Devasundari	C. V. Raju	Rajkumar, Kalyan Kumar, B. Sarojadevi	C. N. Pandurangan	M. H. M. Munaas
Gaali Gopura	B. R. Panthulu	Rajkumar, Kalyan Kumar, Narasimharaju, Leelavathi	T. G. Lingappa	B. R. Panthulu
Karuneye Kutumbada Kannu	T. V. Singh	Rajkumar, Rajaashankar, Leelavathi	G. K. Venkatesh	A. C. Narasimha
Mahathma Kabir	P. Srinivas	Rajkumar, Krishnakumari, Paapamma	G. K. Venkatesh	T. N. Reddy
Rathna Manjari	Hunsur Krishnamurthy	Udaya Kumar, K. S. Ashwath, Sriranga	Rajan-Nagendra	Hunsur Krishnamurthy
Sri Dharmasthala Mahathme	D. Shankar Singh	H. T. Aras, Dikki Madhava Rao, Ramachandra Sastry	M. Venkataraju	D. Shankar Singh
Swarna Gowri	Y. R. Swamy	Rajkumar, Satyanarayana, Rajasree	M. Venkataraju	D. R. Naidu
Thayi Karulu	G. V. Iyer	Kalyan Kumar, Udaya Kumar, M. V. Rajamma	G. K. Venkatesh	G. V. Iyer
Thejaswini	H. L. N. Simha	Rajkumar, Rajaashankar, Pandari Bai	M. Venkataraju	Pandari Bai
Vidhi Vilasa	S. V. Mahesh	Rajkumar, Leelavathi, Udaya Kumar	T. Padman	N. N. Murugayyan

== See also ==
- Kannada films of 1961
- Kannada films of 1963
