= List of Kannada films of 1963 =

== Top-grossing films ==
Rank	Title	Collection	Ref.
1.	Veera Kesari	₹65 lakh (₹57.3 crore in 2025)	
2.	Santha Thukaram	₹50 lakh (₹46.4 crore in 2025)	

== List ==
The following is a list of films produced in the Kannada film industry in India in 1963, presented in alphabetical order.

Title	Director	Cast	Music director	Producer
Ananda Bashpa	R. Nagendra Rao	R. N. Sudarshan, K. S. Ashwath, R. Nagendra Rao	G. K. Venkatesh	R. Nagendra Rao
Bevu Bella	C. P. Jambulingam	Rajaashankar, Leelavathi, H. R. Shastry	P. S. Diwakar	T. S. Gopalakrishna
Bangari	G. V. Iyer	Kalyan Kumar, Vandana, K. S. Ashwath	G. K. Venkatesh	G. V. Iyer
Chandra Kumaara	N. S. Verma	Rajkumar, Udaya Kumar, G. V. Iyer	G. K. Venkatesh	T. Madaar
Gowri	S.K.A	Rajkumar, Sowkar Janaki, Bhagwan	G. K. Venkatesh	K. Narayan Rao
Jenu Goodu	Y. R. Swamy	K. S. Ashwath, G. V. Shivraj, Jayanthi, Pandari Bai	Vijaya Krishnamurthy	T. Vasanna
Jeevana Tharanga	Bangaararaju	Rajkumar, Leelavathi, K. S. Ashwath	M. Venkataraju	D. R. Naidu
Kalitharu Henne	N. C. Rajan	Rajkumar, Leelavathi, Advani Lakshmi Devi	G. K. Venkatesh	Balakrishna
Kanyarathna	J. D. Thotaan	Rajkumar, Leelavathi, Raja Shankar	G. K. Venkatesh	D. B. Naraayan
Kulavadhu	T. V. Singh	Rajkumar, Leelavathi, K. S. Ashwath	G. K. Venkatesh	A. C. Narasimha
Lawyer Magalu	G. V. Iyer	Kalyan Kumar, Udaya Kumar, Vandana	G. K. Venkatesh	G. V. Iyer
Malli Maduve	G. R. Naadan	Rajkumar, Leelavathi, Udaya Kumar	G. K. Venkatesh	Jupiter Pictures Ltd
Mana Mecchida Madadi	K. R. Seetharama Sastry	Rajkumar, Leelavathi, Udaya Kumar	Vijaya Bhaskar	N. B. Vatsalan
Nanda Deepa	M. R. Vittal	Rajkumar, Udaya Kumar, Harini	M. Venkataraju	Vadiraj-Jawahar
Paalige Bandadde Panchamrutha	M. B. Ganesh	Dikki Madhava Rao, Pratimadevi, Saraswathi	A. R. K. Swamy	K. Krishnaswamy
Saaku Magalu	B. R. Panthulu	Rajkumar, Rajaashankar, Sowkar Janaki, Kalpana	T. G. Lingappa	B. R. Panthulu
Santha Thukaram	Sundarrao Nadkarni	Rajkumar, Udaya Kumar, Rajashree	Vijaya Bhaskar	B. Radhakrishna
Sathi Shakthi	Kanagaal Prabhakara Shastry	Rajkumar, M. V. Rajamma, Sahukar Janaki	T. G. Lingappa	Kanagaal Prabhakara Shastry
Sri Ramanjaneya Yuddha	M. S. Nayak	Rajkumar, Udaya Kumar, Jayanti	Satyam	Amritkala
Valmiki	C. S. Rao	Rajkumar, Leelavathi, Narasimharaju	Ghantasala	S. K. Habeebulla
Veera Kesari	B. Vittalacharya	Rajkumar, Leelavathi, M. N. Lakshmi Devi	Ghantasala	Sundarlal Nahata

== See also ==
- Kannada films of 1962
- Kannada films of 1964
