= Bhookailas (1940 film) =

- Theatrical release poster
- Directed by: Sundar Rao Nadkarni
- Written by: Balijepalli Lakshmikantham Kavi
- Produced by: A. V. Meiyappan
- Starring: Subbaiah Naidu; R. Nagendra Rao; Rayaprolu Subramanyam
- Cinematography: Adi Irani
- Edited by: Sundar Rao Nadkarni
- Music by: R. Sudarshanam
- Production company: Pragathi Pictures
- Release date: 14 December 1940
- Running time: 185 minutes
- Country: India
- Language: Telugu

Bhookailas (Telugu: భూకైలాస్) is a 1940 Telugu film produced by A. V. Meiyappan and directed by Sundar Rao Nadkarni. The film starred Subbaiah Naidu, R. Nagendra Rao, and Rayaprolu Subramanyam. It was the first hit film after the establishment of AVM Productions.

It was adapted from the famous Kannada stage play Bhookailasa by Sri Sahitya Samrajya Nataka Mandali of Mysore.

== Plot ==
Demon King Ravana (Subbaiah Naidu) decides to invade Amaravati, the capital of the heavenly kingdom of Indra. Scared of Ravana's plans, Indra asks Narada (R. Nagendra Rao) for help. Narada informs Indra that Ravana's strength comes from the worship performed by Kaikasi (Parvathi Bai), Ravana's mother. He suggests that Indra sabotage Ravana's mother's worship of Saikatha Lingam, a sand sculpture representation of Siva (Rayaprolu Subramanyam).

Ravana decides to perform penance and bring Siva's Atma Lingam for his mother to worship. Hearing of Ravana's plans from Narada, Parvathi (Hymavathi), Siva's consort, appeals to Vishnu. When Siva appears to Ravana to grant his wish, Vishnu manipulates Ravana's mind and makes him wish for Parvathi. As Ravana proceeds home with Parvathi, Narada meets him midway and tells him that his companion is a fake Parvathi. Dejected by the subterfuge, Ravana returns Parvathi to Siva.

During his return journey, he meets Mandodari (Lakshmi Bai), the young princess of Pathala. Believing she is the real Parvathi, he marries her. Eventually, he realizes what happened and appeals to Siva for forgiveness by presenting his severed head. Siva presents Ravana with Atma Lingam and warns him that, if the Atma Lingam ever touches the earth, it can never be moved again. Narada instigates Vinayaka to trick Ravana into grounding the Atma Lingam at what later became known as Gokarna Kshethram in Karnataka.

== Cast ==
- Subbaiah Naidu as Ravana
- R. Nagendra Rao as Narada
- Rayaprolu Subramanyam as Shiva
- Hymavathi as Parvathi
- Parvathi Bai as Kaikasi, mother of Ravana
- Kamalabai as Vishnu Maya
- M. Satyanarayana as Mayasura
- Lakshmi Bai as Mandodari, daughter of Mayasura
- Master Viswam as young Ganesha

== Soundtrack ==
There are about 18 songs and poems in the film. Some of the songs are very popular. Lyrics are written by Balijepalli Lakshmikantham. The music score is provided by R. Sudarsanam.

Track listing
No.	Title	Singer(s)	Length
1.	"Aa Suroopa Rekhaa Idega"	Lakshmi Bai
2.	"Atyacharula Cheta Dharma Vilayambai (poem)"	Hymavathi
3.	"Bhuvanaika Jeeva Trigunanu Bhava"	Parvati Bai
4.	"Dariyedo Choochukora Melkora"	Master Viswam
5.	"Deva Jeevadhara Dayaraada"	Lakshmi Bai
6.	"Ide Kada Parvathi"	Nagendra Rao and Subbaiah Naidu
7.	"Kamala Mano Vihari Shouri"	Nagendra Rao
8.	"Maayalu Saagune Maa Edala"	Lakshmi Bai, Nagendra Rao and Subbaiah Naidu
9.	"Mahaadeva Nee Mahima Ne Grahimpa"	Subbaiah Naidu
10.	"Naa Janma Netiki Dhanyamaye"	Lakshmi Bai and Subbaiah Naidu
11.	"Naa Maaya Natakame Jagati"	Kamalabai
12.	"Nadavare Aavullara Poddugookipoyindi"	Master Viswam
13.	"Premanandamaya.. Naa Manoradhamu"	Lakshmi Bai
14.	"Samba Sadashiva Chandra Kaladhara"	Subbaiah Naidu
15.	"Sambho Shiva Lokaika Guru"	Subbaiah Naidu
16.	"Sri Sarva Mangala Mukha"	Subbaiah Naidu
17.	"Sumadoli Keli Haali Uyyalo Jampalo"	Lakshmi Bai group
18.	"Thagadoyi Danujendra (poem)"	Subbaiah Naidu

== Adaptations ==
Bhookailas (Telugu) (1940)	Bhookailas (Telugu) (1958)	Bhookailasa (Kannada) (1958)
Subbaiah Naidu	Nandamuri Taraka Rama Rao	Rajkumar
R. Nagendra Rao	Akkineni Nageswara Rao	Kalyan Kumar
Lakshmi Bai	Jamuna	Jamuna
