= Mysore Tanga =

- Directed by: G. V. Iyer
- Written by: G. V. Iyer
- Screenplay by: G. V. Iyer
- Produced by: B Vijayalakshmi
- Starring: Kalyan Kumar; B. Vijayalakshmi; Udaykumar; Balakrishna
- Cinematography: Srikanth
- Edited by: M Umanatha Rao
- Music by: Vijaya Bhaskar
- Production company: Vijayalakshmi Movietone
- Distributed by: Vijayalakshmi Movietone
- Release date: 1 April 1968
- Running time: 127 min
- Country: India
- Language: Kannada

Mysore Tanga is a 1968 Indian Kannada film, directed by G. V. Iyer and produced by B Vijayalakshmi. The film stars Kalyan Kumar, B. Vijayalakshmi, Udaykumar and Balakrishna in lead roles, with the musical score composed by Vijaya Bhaskar.

== Cast ==
- Kalyan Kumar
- B. Vijayalakshmi
- Udaykumar
- Balakrishna
- Narasimharaju
- Dinesh
- Ganapathi Bhat
- Bangalore Nagesh
- Shyam
- Venkataram
- Kupparaj
- Kuppuraj
- Anantharam Maccheri
- Madan
- Shailashree
- Jr Revathi
- B. Jaya
- Sacchu
- School Master Lakshmi
- Hema
- Sarasa
