= M. Jayashree =

Indian actress (1921-2006)

N Jayashree
- Jayashree in Mutthaide Bhagya (1956)
- Born: 1921; Mysore, Kingdom of Mysore (in present-day Karnataka, India)
- Died: 29 October 2006 (aged 84–85); Mysore, Karnataka, India
- Occupation: Actress
- Years active: 1948–1996

M. Jayashree (1921 – 2006), was an Indian actress who worked mainly in Kannada films. She is known for her supporting roles in such movies including Rayara Sose (1957), Naagarahaavu (1972), Eradu Kanasu and Sri Srinivasa Kalyana.

She was fondly referred to as 'Amma of Silvar screen'. She received Karnataka State Film Award for Best Supporting Actress for her performance in the movie Amara Bharathi in 1970.

== Career ==
Jayashree was brought to Pakshiraj Studio of Tamil Nadu by Devi, the sister of the studio owner who allowed her to cast in Tamil film Vazhivil Thirunal. Offers were poured in for Jayashree in Tamil movies. This was noticed by Kannada film maker Honnappa Bhagavathar and he made her to debut in Kannada films with the 1948 movie Bhakta Kumbara.

Her next project in Kannada as heroine was Nagakannika in 1949, a blockbuster movie directed by G. Vishwanath. This film considered to be the first Kannada movie based on a folk tale. She played the title role in her next movie Thilotthame in 1951. Gradually she got shifted to supporting roles playing mother, mother-in-law, aunt for stalwarts like Dr. Rajkumar, Kalyan Kumar, Vishnuvardhan, Ambareesh, Tiger Prabhakar, Rajesh, Gangadhar, Srinath and many. In her five decades acting career, Jayashree starred more than 450 films.

== Last days and death ==
Jayashree did only two movies in the 1990s. Her last released movie was Savira Mettilu, an unfinished film of Puttanna Kanagal and finished by K. S. L. Swamy.

Jayashree spent last years of her life in Sri Vasavi Shantidhama, an old age home in Mysore. She died of heart attack early morning on 29 October 2006.

== Awards ==
- 1970-71 - Karnataka State Film Award for Best Supporting Actress for the film ‛Amara Bharathi’.

== Selected filmography ==
=== Kannada ===
Year	Title	Role	Notes
1949	Bhakta Kumbara		
1949	Nagakannika		
1951	Thilotthame	Thilotthame	
1951	Jaganmohini		
1953	Mangala Gowri		
1954	Natashekhara		
1955	Sodari	Chanchaladevi	
1955	Modala Thedi		
1956	Muttaide Bhagya	Gowri	
1956	Daiva Sankalpa		
1957	Rayara Sose	Gowri	
1957	Sati Nalaayini	Parvati	
1957	Bettada Kalla		
1960	Rani Honnamma		
1960	Bhakta Kanakadasa		
1960	Dashavathara		
1962	Rathna Manjari		
1962	Swarna Gowri	Maharani	
1962	Mahathma Kabir	Neema	
1963	Jenu Goodu	Sharada	
1963	Mana Mecchida Madadi	Girija	
1964	Naandi	Savitri	
1964	Chandavalliya Thota	Puttathayi	
1964	Kalaavati	Puttamma	
1964	Thumbida Koda	Jaya	
1965	Ide Mahasudina	Poornima	
1965	Miss Leelavathi	Ganga	
1966	Madhumalathi	Gajalakshmi	
1967	Lagna Pathrike	Savitri	
1968	Bhagyada Bagilu	Kamala	
1968	Hannele Chiguridaga	Raji	
1968	Manku Dinne	Kaveri	
1969	Uyyale	Krishna's mother	
1969	Mayor Muthanna	Kamala	
1969	Margadarshi	Raji	
1969	Bhale Raja	Parvattamma	
1970	Hasiru Thorana	Jayashree	
1970	Devara Makkalu	Rukmini	
1970	Lakshmi Saraswathi	Lalitha	
1970	Modala Rathri	Kaveri	
1971	Sakshatkara	Maniyamma	
1971	Baala Bandhana	Parvati	
1971	Bhale Adrushtavo Adrushta	Aravind's mother	
1972	Naagarahaavu	Sonabai	
1972	Sipayi Ramu	Ramu	
1973	Devaru Kotta Thangi	Nagamma	
1973	Kesarina Kamala	Parvati	
1974	Sri Srinivasa Kalyana	Dharani Devi	
1974	Eradu Kanasu	Gowri's mother	
1976	Raja Nanna Raja		
1976	Bayalu Daari	Anusuya	
1976	Baduku Bangaravayithu	Ganga	
1977	Sose Tanda Soubhagya		
1978	Paduvaaralli Pandavaru	Lakshmi	
1980	Haddina Kannu		
1980	Moogana Sedu		
1981	Hennina Sedu		
1982	Tony		
1983	Premave Balina Belaku	Susheela	
1985	Nanna Prathigne	Seethamma	
1986	Aruna Raaga		
1986	Karna		
1987	Sundara Swapnagalu		
1987	Aaganthuka		
1987	Ee Bandha Anubandha	Vijay's aunt	
1990	Nammoora Hammera		

=== Telugu ===
- Manchi Manasuku Manchi Rojulu (1956)
- Anthuleni Katha (1976)

== See also ==
Karnataka State Film Award for Best Supporting Actress
