= Bhookailas (1958 film) =

1958 film by K. Shankar

- Theatrical release poster
- Directed by: K. Shankar
- Written by: Samudrala Sr (dialogues)
- Screenplay by: K. Shankar
- Produced by: A. V. Meiyappan
- Starring: N. T. Rama Rao; Akkineni Nageswara Rao; Jamuna
- Cinematography: Madhava Bulbule
- Edited by: K. Shankar; K. Narayanan
- Music by: R. Sudarsanam; R. Govardhanam
- Production company: AVM Productions
- Release date: 20 March 1958
- Running time: 174 minutes
- Country: India
- Language: Telugu

Bhookailas is a 1958 Indian Telugu-language Hindu mythological film directed by K. Shankar. It stars N. T. Rama Rao, Akkineni Nageswara Rao, Jamuna with music composed by R. Sudarsanam and R. Govardhanam. It was produced by A. V. Meiyappan under the AVM Productions banner.

The story is based on the Sthala Purana of Gokarna Kshetram in Karnataka. Previously, a film was made with the same story casting in Telugu in 1940 with the same title which was an adaptation of the famous Kannada stage play Bhookailasa by Sri Sahitya Samrajya Nataka Mandali of Mysore. A. V. Meiyappan also shot the movie simultaneously in Kannada as Bhookailasa starring Rajkumar.

== Plot ==
The film begins at Lanka, where its Empire Ravana trounces the Earth and declares to invade Amaravati. Narada keeps posting it to Indra and proclaims Ravana's power secret is devotion to his mother Kaikashi. Every day, she worships Saikathalingam, a sand sculptured Siva at the banks of the sea. So, Indra sabotages Kaikashi's prayers when enraged Ravana pledges to gift Atmalingam, i.e., the Lord's soul, to her and walks on to penance. Midway, Ravana meets Narada and divulges his intention. Hearing it, Parvati discomposes and bows before Vishnu for her husband's consort, who swears to help. Ravana underwent rigorous penance when stirred Siva & Parvati appeared. Vishnu manipulates an illusion that makes Ravana lust for Parvati and asks her, which the Lord grants. Parvati is cognizant of Vishnu's play and curses him to weep by detaching from his wife.

Listening to it, Narada is on cloud nine as a glorifying welcome sign of Ramavatar. Parvati morphs into Bhadrakali, and Ravana is startled when Narada tells him that Siva has endorsed a duplicate. Hence, he withdraws her at Siva and is searching for the original. At this point, Ravana is spotted by Mandodari, the daughter of Mayasura, ruler of Patala, who crushes on him at first sight. Narada poses her as Parvati, so she sets foot in their world. Initially, Mayasura defies the match since he is Vishnu's ardent devotee and Ravana is his antagonist. Narada straightens it out and performs the nuptials of Ravana & Mandodari. Soon after reaching home, Kaikashi questions Atmalingam when he states what happened, and she rebukes him. Learning the antecedents of Mandodari Ravana is violated by Narada, whose angered counsel extracts his illusion. Then, Ravana dies out of repentance and attempts self-sacrifice. Kaikashi bars it, enlightening him to give it another shot with unvarying initiation.

Thus, Ravana moves on and seeks regret before the Lord by decapitating. Elated Siva bestows him Atmalingam and edicts avoid putting it on the ground before landing in Lanka. Narada intends to hinder it and instigates Ganesha, who disguises himself as a Brahmin boy. Amidst, Ravana must fulfill the ritual to Surya when he gets the boy's aid to hold the Atmalingam. The boy stipulates that he will call him thrice and, if not, place it on the Earth. Accordingly, he alarms him thrice and puts it down. Infuriated, Ravana jumps onto Vigneswara, whom Narada pacifies. Next, he struggles his extent to re-extract Atmalingam but fails. Ergo collapses and implores before the statue because he cannot keep up his word. At last, Siva arises with Parvati & Ganesha, proclaiming that the idolatry took place since it is sanctum, and his story will be immortal. Finally, the movie ends by showing the place the public adores as Mahabaleshwar Temple, Gokarna at Karnataka till today.

== Cast ==
- Nandamuri Taraka Rama Rao as Ravana
- Akkineni Nageswara Rao as Narada Maharshi
- Jamuna as Mandodari
- S. V. Ranga Rao as Mayasura
- Nagabhushanam as Lord Siva
- Mahankali Venkaiah as Kumbhakarna
- B. Saroja Devi as Goddess Parvati
- Hemalatha as Kaikesi
- Helen as Apsara (in song Sundaranga Andukora)
- Vijaya Nirmala as Goddess Sita
- Kamala Lakshman as Dancer (in song Munneeta Pavalinchu)

== Soundtrack ==
Bhookailas

Film score by R. Sudarsanam R. Govardhanam
- Released: 1958
- Genre: Soundtrack
- Length: 61:35
- Producers: R. Sudharsanam; R. Govardhanam

Telugu Songs

Music composed by R. Sudarsanam, R. Govardhanam. Lyrics were written by Samudrala Sr.

S. No.	Song title	Singers	length	Tamil
1	"Andamulu Vindulayye"	P. Susheela, A. P. Komala & T. S. Bagavathi	3:54	
2	"Deva Deva Dhavalachala"	Ghantasala	4:05	
3	"Deva Mahadeva"	M. L. Vasantha Kumari	3:17	
4	"Munneeta Pavalinchu"	M. L. Vasantha Kumari	4:31	
5	"Naa Nomu Phalinchenuga"	P. Susheela	5:26	
6	"Agni Shikalatho"	Ghantasala	1:21	
7	"Neela Kandhara"	Ghantasala	9:11	Chandra Sekhara Vaarai
8	"Premale Vidhama"	Ghantasala, P. Susheela	3:32	
9	"Ramuni Avatharam"	Ghantasala	6:23	
10	"Sundaranga Andukora"	P. Susheela, Ghantasala	4:02	
11	"Taguna Varameeya"	Ghantasala	4:48	Iraivaa Vaa Vaa
12	"Teeyani Talapula"	P. Susheela	3:11	Un Thiruvadai Malar
13	"Eenenu Moodu Nala"	A. P. Komala	3:28	Indha Udal Moondru Naal
14	"Naa Kanula Mundoluku"	Ghantasala	0:58	
15	"Pilichina Palukuma"	Ghantasala	1:21	
16	"Saikatha Lingam"	Ghantasala	1:23	
17	"Swamy Danyudanithi"	Ghantasala	0:44	

== Adaptations ==
Bhookailas (Telugu) (1940)	Bhookailas (Telugu) (1958)	Bhookailasa (Kannada) (1958)
Subbaiah Naidu	Nandamuri Taraka Rama Rao	Rajkumar
R. Nagendra Rao	Akkineni Nageswara Rao	Kalyan Kumar
Lakshmi Bai	Jamuna	Jamuna

== Other ==
- VCDs & DVDs on – VOLGA Videos, Hyderabad
- VCDs & DVDs on – SHALIMAR Video Company, Hyderabad
