= Simha Gharjane =

- Video Cover
- Directed by: S. A. Chandrasekhar
- Written by: Kunigal Nagabhushan (dialogues)
- Screenplay by: S. A. Chandrasekhar
- Story by: M. D. Sundar
- Produced by: A. R. Raju
- Starring: Vishnuvardhan; Vijayashanti; Kalyan Kumar; Urvasi Sharada
- Cinematography: M.Kesavan
- Edited by: P. Venkateshwara Rao
- Music by: Satyam
- Production company: Ajantha Combines
- Distributed by: Ajantha Combines
- Release date: 27 December 1983
- Running time: 140 min
- Country: India
- Language: Kannada

Simha Gharjane (transl. Roar of the lion) is a 1983 Indian Kannada-language film, directed by S. A. Chandrasekhar and produced by A. R. Raju. The film stars Vishnuvardhan, Vijayashanti, Kalyan Kumar and Sharada. This film was the remake of the Telugu movie Mama Allula Saval (1980).

== Plot ==
Jayasimha, a dedicated and upright lawyer, finds himself falling in love with Lalitha, the daughter of a morally compromised police officer. When the corrupt policeman attempts to persuade Jaysimha to abandon a critical case, Jaysimha stands firm in his pursuit of justice, inadvertently inviting a series of challenges and obstacles into his life. As the story unfolds, the film explores themes of integrity, love, and the struggle against corruption.

== Cast ==
- Vishnuvardhan as 'Lion' Jayasimha
- Vijayashanti as Lalitha
- Kalyan Kumar as S.P. Chandrashekhar
- Sharada as Sharada
- Jai Jagadish as Vijay
- Mukhyamantri Chandru as Patitha Pavana Murthy
- Ceylon Manohar as Manohar
- Chethan Ramarao
- Dinesh
- M. S. Umesh
- B. K. Shankar
- Thimmaiah
- Anuradha as Roopa (Guest Appearance)
- Jayalakshmi as Santhanalakshmi
- Leelavathi in Guest Appearance
- Sundar Krishna Urs as Sundar Rao (Guest Appearance)
- Rajanand in Guest Appearance

== Production ==
Veteran producer A. R. Raju decided to produce the movie. Vishnuvardhan was roped in to play the lead role. Two notable movies in the career of the lead actor, Sahodarara Saval and Vijay Vikram, were also produced by Raju.

== Soundtrack ==
Simha Gharjane

Soundtrack album by Chellapilla Satyam
- Released: 1983
- Recorded: 1983
- Genre: Feature film soundtrack

Singles from Simha Gharjane
- 1. "Eddelo Bega Sididu"

Chi. Udayashankar and R. N. Jayagopal wrote the lyrics. Chellapilla Satyam scored the music. The song Kannalli Nee Bandu was sung by Vishnuvardhan himself.

| No. | Title | Singer(s) | Length |
|---|---|---|---|
| 1. | "Kannalli Nee Bandu" | Vishnuvardhan; S. Janaki |
| 2. | "Saavira Aase Moodide Indu" | S.Janaki; S. P. Balasubrahmanyam |
| 3. | "Nanna Ninna Aase" | P. Susheela; S.P.Balasubrahmanyam |
| 4. | "S.Janaki; S.P.Balasubrahmanyam" | Hosa Kathe Odu Kannalli |
| 5. | "Eddelo Bega Sididu" | S.P.Balasubrahmanyam |
