= Mutthaide Bhagya =

Mutthaide Bhagya (lit. 'Destiny Comes') may refer to these Indian films:

- Mutthaide Bhagya (1956 film), a Kannada-language film directed by B. Vittalacharya
- Mutthaide Bhagya (1983 film), a Kannada-language film directed by K N Chandrashekar Sharma
