= Veera Kesari =

- VCD cover
- Directed by: B. Vittalacharya
- Produced by: Sundarlal Nahatha; Doondi
- Starring: Rajkumar; T. N. Balakrishna; Udaykumar; R. Nagendra Rao
- Cinematography: Ravi
- Edited by: N. S. Prakasham
- Music by: Ghantasala
- Production company: Rajalakshmi Productions
- Release date: 1963
- Country: India
- Language: Kannada

Veera Kesari is a 1963 Indian Kannada-language swashbuckler film directed by B. Vittalacharya and produced by Sundarlal Nahatha and Doondi. The film stars Rajkumar, T. N. Balakrishna, Udaykumar and R. Nagendra Rao. The musical score was composed by Ghantasala. S. Siddalingaiah served as the assistant director. B. Vittalacharya also shot the film simultaneously in Telugu as Bandipotu, starring N. T. Rama Rao.

Critics have described Veera Kesari as a "clever adaptation of the adventures of Robin Hood," with the romantic subplot inspired by William Shakespeare's The Taming of the Shrew. The film's climax scene was shot in Eastmancolor. It was a major box office success. Midway through production, director Vittalacharya, who was suffering from typhoid, asked his friend, M. R. Vittal to complete the shoot. Vittal directed a significant portion of the film, including the song "Mellusiri Savigaana", but declined to be credited as the director.

== Plot ==
SaptaSena Maharaja R. Nagendra Rao has lost his legs, and administration is taken over by ShooraSimha (Udaykumar). ShooraSimha rules with an iron hand, torturing the masses and suppressing rebellions. He has an affair with a palace courtesan but aims to marry the princess, MandaaraMaala (Leelavathi). Narasimha (Rajkumar), whose uncle (K. S. Ashwath) is in hiding, leads a rebellion against ShooraSimha. K. S. Ashwath, known as Musuku-veera plays the hero, concealing his face with a mask.

K. S. Ashwath's elder brother, H. Ramachandra Shastry, however, does not agree with the armed fight. Tensions rise when Narasimha wards off K. S. Ashwath's attempt to kidnap Mandaaramaale. Reluctantly giving in to his brother's wish, K. S. Ashwath agrees to formally complain to SaptaSena Maharaja. However, ShooraSimha kills both brothers before they can present their case to the Maharaja. Before dying, H. Ramachandra Shastry urges Narasimha to abandon the non-violent path he had followed all his life and take up arms against ShooraSimha's tyranny.

Narasimha takes on his Uncle's role as Musuku-veera, kidnaps MandaaraMaale, and exposes her to the harsh conditions faced by the masses. After she comes to understand the suffering of the common people, he releases her. Romance blossoms between MandaaraMaale and Narasimha, much to the displeasure of ShooraSimha.

SaptaSena Maharaja learns of ShooraSimha's misdeeds and confronts him. In a fit of rage, ShooraSimha imprisons the Maharaja. The Palace-courtesan devises a "Damsel in Distress" plot, discovers Musuku-veera's hideout, and tricks ShooraSimha into capturing him. Condemned to prison, Narasimha is sentenced to be executed at the same time as ShooraSimha's ascension to the throne.

In a final showdown, Narasimha escapes from prison, defeats ShooraSimha at his own game, and bringing peace to the kingdom. SaptaSena Maharaja offers the throne and his daughter's hand to NaraSimha. However, Narasimha vows to rule the kingdom only to help the people.

== Cast ==
- Rajkumar as Narasimha
- T. N. Balakrishna
- Udaykumar
- R. Nagendra Rao
- T. R. Narasimharaju
- Leelavathi
- E. V. Saroja
- M. N. Lakshmi Devi
- B. Jayashree
- B. Jaya
- K. S. Ashwath
- H. R. Shastry
- Rathnakar
- Shivashankar
- Satyam
- Comedian Guggu

== Soundtrack ==
The music was composed by Ghantasala. The song "Mellusiri Savigana" inspired a 2004 film of same name. The song was recreated by Ajaneesh Lokanath for the film Spooky House.

Song	Singers	Lyrics	Length (m:ss)
"Dhundu Malli"	P. Leela, Ghantasala	Sorat Ashwath	03:40
"Ellaninagage"	P. Leela, Ghantasala	Sorat Ashwath	03:18
"Hareyukkide"	P. Leela	Ashwath	03:02
"Mellusiri Savigana"	Ghantasala, P. Susheela	K. R. Seetharama Sastry	03:36
"O Nama Bharada"	P. Susheela	Sorat Ashwath	03:12
"Prajara Maathanu"	Ghantasala, P. Susheela	Sorat Ashwath	03:15
"Ramalakshmanaranu"	Ghantasala, P. Susheela	Sorat Ashwath	02:47
"Swabhimanadha Nalle"	Ghantasala	K. R. Seetharama Sastry	03:40
