= Manku Dinne =

- Directed by: K. S. L. Swamy
- Written by: Chi Udayashankar
- Screenplay by: A. M. Sameevulla
- Produced by: A. M. Sameevulla
- Starring: Kalyan Kumar; B. Vijayalakshmi; Balakrishna; B. Jayashree
- Cinematography: K. Janakiram
- Edited by: Bal G. Yadav
- Music by: Vijaya Bhaskar
- Production company: Bawa Movietone
- Distributed by: Bawa Movietone
- Release date: 26 February 1968
- Country: India
- Language: Kannada

Manku Dinne is a 1968 Indian Kannada film, directed by K. S. L. Swamy and produced by A. M. Sameevulla. The film stars Kalyan Kumar, B. Vijayalakshmi, Balakrishna and B. Jayashree in the lead roles. The film has musical score by Vijaya Bhaskar.

== Cast ==
- Kalyan Kumar
- B. Vijayalakshmi
- Balakrishna
- M. Jayashree
- Dinesh
- Shylashri
- Narasimharaju
- Jr. Revathi
- Dwarakish
- B. V. Radha
- M. Srinivas
- Akhthar
- Humayun
- H. M. T. Sathya
- Sathyanarayana
- Asad

== Soundtrack ==
The music was composed by Vijaya Bhaskar with lyrics written by Chi. Udayashankar.

No.	Song	Singers	Length (m:ss)
1	"Baa Bega Manamohini"	P. B. Sreenivas, S. Janaki	03:23
2	"Guarantee Sweet Seventeen"	S. Janaki, L. R. Eswari	03:42
3	"Madhura Madhura Ee"	P. B. Sreenivas, P. Susheela	03:49
4	"Ammana Madilali"	P. Leela	03:24
5	"Bengaloora Dundumalli"	S. Janaki	03:18
6	"Idea Vidhi Leele"	K. J. Yesudas	03:29
7	"O Gelathi Nanna"	P. B. Sreenivas, B. K. Sumithra	03:27
