= Mavana Magalu =

- Directed by: S. K. A. Chari
- Written by: Ashapoornadevi
- Produced by: A. V. Subba Rao
- Starring: Kalyan Kumar; Jayalalitha; K. S. Ashwath; T. N. Balakrishna
- Cinematography: Annayya
- Edited by: J. Krishnaswamy
- Music by: T. Chalapathi Rao
- Production company: Prasad Art Pictures
- Release date: 18 September 1965
- Country: India
- Language: Kannada

Mavana Magalu (transl. Uncle's daughter;) is a 1965 Indian Kannada-language film, directed by S. K. A. Chari. The film stars Kalyan Kumar, Jayalalitha, K. S. Ashwath and T. N. Balakrishna. The film has musical score by T. Chalapathi Rao.

== Cast ==
- Kalyan Kumar as Manjunath
- J. Jayalalithaa as Saroja
- K. S. Ashwath
- T. N. Balakrishna
- Narasimharaju
- Vidyavathi as Shibu, Saroja's mother
- Ranga
- Comedian Guggu
- Rangabhoomi Narayan
- Girimaji
- H. R. Sharma
- Shivaram
- Shivaji
- Master Basavaraj
- Master Yogindrakumar
- Swamy Rao
- H. M. Gowda
- Bhaskar
- Bangalore Basappa
- B. Jayamma
- B. Jayashree
- Vasanthi
- Baby Padmashree
- Sharada

== Production ==
Part of the film was shot at Nandi Hills. This was one of two of Jayalalithaa's films for which Bhavani Lakshminarayan worked as a still photographer.

== Soundtrack ==
The music was composed by T. Chalapathi Rao.

No.	Song	Singers	Lyrics	Length (m:ss)
1	"Naane Veene Neene Thanthi"	P. B. Sreenivas, S. Janaki	Ku. Vem. Pu	03:27
