= Bhakta Chetha =

1961 film

Bhakta Cheta
- Directed by: M. B. Ganesh Singh
- Produced by: D. Shankar Singh
- Starring: Rajkumar; Pratima Devi; Indira
- Cinematography: K. S. Govindaswamy
- Edited by: P. U. S. Maniyam
- Music by: Srinivasa Iyengar
- Distributed by: Venkateshwara Productions
- Release date: 10 October 1961
- Running time: 135 minutes
- Country: India
- Language: Kannada

Bhakta Cheta is a 1961 Indian Kannada language film directed by M. B. Ganesh. The film stars Rajkumar, Pratima Devi and Indira with Rajendra Singh Babu as a child artist.

== Cast ==
- Rajkumar
- Prathima Devi
- Indira
- Balakrishna
- H. R. Shastry
- Dikki Madhava Rao
