= Hosilu Mettida Hennu =

- Directed by: V. T. Thyagarajan
- Produced by: T. H. Rama Murthy
- Starring: Vishnuvardhan; Aarathi; Leelavathi; Ambareesh
- Cinematography: R. N. Krishna Prasad
- Music by: T. G. Lingappa
- Release date: 1976
- Country: India
- Language: Kannada

Hosilu Mettida Hennu ( transl. The woman stepping on the doorway) is a 1976 Indian Kannada-language film, directed by V. T. Thyagarajan and produced by T. H. Rama Murthy. The film stars Vishnuvardhan, Aarathi, Leelavathi and Ambareesh. The film has musical score by T. G. Lingappa.

== Cast ==
- Vishnuvardhan
- Aarathi
- Leelavathi
- Ambareesh
- Krishna Kumari
- T. N. Balakrishna

== Soundtrack ==
The music was composed by T. G. Lingappa.

| No. | Song | Singers | Lyrics | Length (m:ss) |
|---|---|---|---|---|
| 1 | "Hoonage Daivada Sannidhiyo" | S. P. Balasubrahmanyam, P. Susheela | R. N. Jayagopal | 03:20 |
| 2 | "Saavira Prashneya" | P. Susheela | R. N. Jayagopal | 03:24 |
