= Annapoorna (film) =

1964 film

- Directed by: Aarooru Pattabhi
- Produced by: Pandari Bai
- Starring: K. S. Ashwath; Pandari Bai; Mynavathi; Rajkumar; Kalyan Kumar
- Cinematography: R. Madhu
- Edited by: Aaroor Pattabhi
- Music by: Rajan–Nagendra
- Distributed by: Sri Panduranga Productions
- Release date: 1964
- Running time: 155 minutes
- Country: India
- Language: Kannada

Annapoorna is a 1964 Indian Kannada language film directed by Aaroor Pattabhi and produced by actress Pandari Bai. Besides Pandari Bai herself in the title role, the film starred K. S. Ashwath, Mynavathi and Balakrishna in other main roles. Popular star Kalyan Kumar made a brief appearance in the first half of the film while Rajkumar makes an entry after one and a half hour into the movie. He appeared in the role of a lawyer for the first time on-screen. Chi. Udayashankar became a full-fledged lyricist for the first time by writing all the songs of this movie. The movie is a remake of Pandari Bai's 1959 Tamil film Aval Yaar which had not performed well at the box-office.

== Plot summary ==
The film portrays the life of a compassionate and determined woman named Annapoorna, who dedicates her life to holding her family together through emotional hardships. After being abandoned by her husband Shivashankar, Annapoorna settles down as a nanny in a different town.

Her son Krishna (Rajkumar), who appears later in the film, becomes a lawyer and is unaware of his mother's struggles. Conflict arises when Krishna takes up a case that threatens to harm his own family. The story highlights a mother's selfless love, the importance of doing what's right, and how families can heal and come back together. The story concludes with emotional reunions and the restoration of family bonds, highlighting Annapoorna's unwavering strength and moral dignity.

== Cast ==
- K. S. Ashwath as Shivashankar
- Pandari Bai as Annapoorna
- Mynavathi as Radha
- Balakrishna as Kailas
- Ganapathi Bhat as Narasimhayya
- R. T. Rama as Ashadevi
- K. M. Rathnakar as Kaashi
- Rajkumar as Krishna
- Kalyan Kumar as Mohan Ram (cameo)
- R. Nagendra Rao in a guest appearance
- B Ramadevi as Kamala
- V. Nagayya as Ramakrishnayy, Annapurna's father
- Ravikala as (Baby Ravikala) as Krishna
- SM Veerabhadrappa
- B Hanumanthachar
- Sadashivayya
- Kumari Rama
- Padmamma as maid
- Music Director Vijaya Bhaskar (credited as Bhaskar) as Shashikanth singing "Kannadave Taynudiyu" and '"Hrudayaveene Nudiye Taane" in the voice of P. B. Srinivas

== Soundtrack ==
The music of the film was composed by Rajan–Nagendra, with lyrics for the soundtrack written by Chi. Udaya Shankar.

=== Track list ===
#	Title	Singer(s)
1	"Kannadave Thaynudiyu"	P. B. Sreenivas
2	"Hrudayada Veene"	P. B. Sreenivas
3	"Anda Chendada Hoove"	P. Leela, T. R. Jayadev
4	"Cheluvina Siriye"	A. L. Raghavan
5	"Krishna Bidu Bidu Kopava"	S. Janaki
