= Kallu Sakkare =

- Directed by: Kalyan Kumar
- Produced by: Kalyan Kumar
- Starring: Kalyan Kumar; Jayanthi; Jr. Revathi; B. Vijayalakshmi
- Cinematography: R. Chittibabu
- Music by: N. S. Thyagarajan
- Release date: 1967
- Country: India
- Language: Kannada

Kallu Sakkare is a 1967 Indian Kannada film, directed and produced by Kalyan Kumar. The film stars Kalyan Kumar, Jayanthi, Jr. Revathi and B. Vijayalakshmi in the lead roles. It features a musical score by N. S. Thyagarajan.

== Cast ==
- Kalyan Kumar
- Jayanthi
- Jr. Revathi
- B. Vijayalakshmi
- K. S. Ashwath
