= Mohini Bhasmasura =

- Directed by: S. S. Verma
- Produced by: T. Madaar; V. M. Kuppayya Chettiyar
- Starring: Rajkumar; Leelavathi; Udaykumar; T. N. Balakrishna
- Music by: T. Chalapathi Rao
- Production company: HM Baba Productions
- Release date: 1966
- Country: India
- Language: Kannada

Mohini Bhasmasura is a 1966 Kannada-language Indian Hindu mythological film directed by S. S. Verma and produced by T. Madaar and V.M.Kuppayya Chettiyar. The film stars Rajkumar, Leelavathi, Udaykumar and TN Balakrishna in the lead roles. The musical score was composed by T. Chalapathi Rao. Vijaya Narasimha wrote both dialogues and songs for the film.

== Cast ==
- Rajkumar as Bhasmasura
- Leelavathi
- Uday Kumar as Shiva
- TN Balakrishna as Narada
