= Bevu Bella (1963 film) =

- Directed by: C. P. Jambulingam
- Produced by: T. S. Gopalakrishna
- Starring: Udaykumar; Raja shankar Leelavathi; H. Ramachandra Shastry
- Cinematography: T. K. Venkat
- Music by: P. S. Diwakar
- Release date: 1963
- Country: India
- Language: Kannada

Bevu Bella is a 1963 Indian Kannada film directed by C. P. Jambulingam and produced by T. S. Gopalakrishna. The film stars Udaykumar, Raja Shankar, Leelavathi and H. Ramachandra Shastry in the lead roles. The musical score was composed by P. S. Diwakar.

== Cast ==
- Udaykumar
- Raja shankar
- Leelavathi
- H. Ramachandra Shastry
