= Hoovu Mullu =

- Directed by: A. V. Sheshagiri Rao
- Written by: Geethapriya
- Screenplay by: A. V. Sheshagiri Rao
- Produced by: A L A Naidu
- Starring: Udaykumar; Kalpana; Balakrishna; Dikki Madhavarao
- Cinematography: T Ellappa
- Edited by: P Bhakthavathsalam
- Music by: Satyam
- Production company: Madhu Art Films
- Distributed by: Madhu Art Films
- Release date: 4 November 1968
- Country: India
- Language: Kannada

Hoovu Mullu is a 1968 Indian Kannada film, directed by A. V. Sheshagiri Rao and produced by A L A Naidu. The film stars Udaykumar, Kalpana, Balakrishna and Dikki Madhavarao in lead roles, with a musical score composed by Satyam.

== Cast ==
- Udaykumar as Bhima
- Kalpana as Cheluvi
- Balakrishna
- Dikki Madhava Rao
- M. P. Shankar
- Ranga
- H. R. Shastry
- Sadhana
- Renuka
- A. L. Abbaiah Naidu
- Shanthinidevi
- Vijayaleela
- Vijayaprabha
- Jayaram
- Devaraj
- Anvaruddin
- Nagesh Rao
- Venkataramanappa
