= Shiva Parvathi =

- Directed by: T. Janakiram
- Produced by: Hunsur Krishnamurthy
- Starring: Kemparaj Urs; Prathima devi Sumathi Kashinath; Shantha
- Cinematography: T. Janakiram
- Music by: B. Dayanidhi
- Production company: Chitravani Productions
- Distributed by: Chitravani Productions
- Release date: 1950
- Country: India
- Language: Kannada

Shiva Parvathi is a 1950 Indian Kannada film, directed by T. Janakiram and produced by Hunsur Krishnamurthy. The film stars Kemparaj Urs, Prathima Devi, Sumathi Kashinath and Shantha in the lead roles. The film has musical score by B. Dayanidhi.

== Cast ==
- Kemparaj Urs
- Prathima Devi
- Sumathi Kashinath
- Shantha
