= Devasundari =

- Directed by: C. V. Raju
- Produced by: M. H. M. Munas
- Starring: Rajkumar; B. Saroja Devi; Kalyan Kumar; Narasimharaju
- Cinematography: D. S. Kotnis
- Music by: C. N. Panduranga
- Release date: 1962
- Country: India
- Language: Kannada

Devasundari is a 1962 Indian Kannada-language film, directed by C. V. Raju and produced by M. H. M. Munas. The film stars Rajkumar, B. Saroja Devi, Kalyan Kumar and Narasimharaju. The film has musical score by C. N. Panduranga. The dialogues were written by T. N. Balakrishna who also wrote 16 songs in the movie one of which (Kaavi Battetottavarella) was sung by Dr. Rajkumar which was picturized on Narasimharaju - the first instance where Rajkumar's voice was used for a song not picturized on him.

== Cast ==
- Rajkumar as Gandharva Shankhapala
- B. Saroja Devi as Devasundari
- Kalyan Kumar as Veera Pratapa
- Narasimharaju

== Music ==
- "Kavi Battethottavarella" - Dr. Rajkumar, Sarojini
