= Badukuva Daari =

- Directed by: K. S. Prakash Rao
- Produced by: A. S. R. Aanjaneyulu
- Starring: Jayalalitha; Kalyan Kumar; Udaykumar; Narasimharaju
- Cinematography: J. Satya Narayana
- Music by: T. Chalapathi Rao
- Production company: Balaram Pictures
- Distributed by: Balaram Pictures
- Release date: 1966
- Country: India
- Language: Kannada

Badukuva Daari is a 1966 Indian Kannada-language film, directed by Vedantam Raghavayya and produced by A. S. R. Aanjaneyulu. The film stars Jayalalitha, Kalyan Kumar, Udaykumar, and Narasimharaju. The musical score was composed by T. Chalapathi Rao. The film is based on the 1953 Telugu film Bratuku Teruvu, which was later remade in Hindi in 1969 as Jeene Ki Raah and in Tamil in 1972 as Naan Yen Pirandhen.

== Cast ==
- Jayalalitha
- Kalyan Kumar
- Udaykumar
- Narasimharaju
- Balakrishna
- Ramesh

== Soundtrack ==
The music was composed by T. Chalapathi Rao.

No.	Song	Singers	Lyrics	Length (m:ss)
1	"Illoo Iruve"	S. Janaki	Hunsur Krishnamurthy	02:55
2	"Thaayi Thandheyu Otha"	P. Susheela	Hunsur Krishnamurthy	03:41
