= College Ranga =

- Directed by: Puttanna Kanagal
- Screenplay by: Puttanna Kanagal
- Story by: B. G. L. Swamy
- Based on: College Ranga by B. G. L. Swamy
- Produced by: B. R. Ravishankar
- Starring: Kalyan Kumar; Jayasimha; Leelavathi; Lokanath; Gode Lakshminarayana
- Cinematography: B. N. Haridas
- Edited by: V. P. Krishna
- Music by: T. G. Lingappa
- Distributed by: Padmini Pictures
- Release date: 1976
- Running time: 142 minutes
- Country: India
- Language: Kannada

College Ranga ( transl. The College Stage) is a 1976 Kannada language film directed by Puttanna Kanagal, based on a novel by B. G. L. Swamy of the same name, and starring Kalyan Kumar, Jayasimha, Leelavathi. The supporting cast features Lokanath, Musuri Krishnamurthy, B. R. Jayaram and Gode Lakshminarayana. The film highlights the ambience of a typical college campus, its politics and the students.

== Cast ==
- Kalyan Kumar as Professor Dr. Devayya
- G. K. Govinda Rao
- Anantharam Maccheri as Principal Somayya
- Jayasimha as Ramu
- Leelavathi
- Lokanath as Adavaiyya
- Padmashree as Gauri
- Musuri Krishnamurthy
- Gode Lakshminarayana as Clerk Rangaswamy
- B. R. Jayaram as Clerk / Stores in charge Cheluvaiah
- Venkat Rao as Seenappa
- Dikki Madhava Rao
- Yoga Narasimha—guest appearance
- Seetaram—guest appearance
- Uma Shivakumar—guest appearance

== Soundtaack ==
- Uppu Thinda Mele Neera Kudiyale Beku
- Kaleju Rangadalli Kalinga Sarpa Bandaithe
