= Endu Ninnavane =

- Directed by: Kalyan Kumar
- Produced by: Kalyan Kumar
- Starring: Kalyan Kumar; Jayanthi; G. V. Lathadevi; Ramesh
- Music by: Rajan–Nagendra
- Release date: 1966
- Country: India
- Language: Kannada

Endu Ninnavane is a 1966 Indian Kannada film, directed and produced by Kalyan Kumar. The film stars Kalyan Kumar, Jayanthi, G. V. Lathadevi and Ramesh in the lead roles. The film has musical score by Rajan–Nagendra.

== Cast ==
- Kalyan Kumar
- Jayanthi
- G. V. Lathadevi
- Ramesh
