= Naane Bhagyavati =

- Directed by: T. V. Singh Thakur
- Produced by: M. Sampath
- Starring: Kalyan Kumar; Udaykumar; Mynavathi; Bharathi
- Cinematography: R. Sampath
- Music by: T. G. Lingappa
- Release date: 1968
- Country: India
- Language: Kannada

Naane Bhagyavati is a 1968 Indian Kannada film, directed by T. V. Singh Thakur and produced by M. Sampath. The film stars Kalyan Kumar, Udaykumar, Mynavathi and Bharathi in the lead roles. The film has musical score by T. G. Lingappa.

== Cast ==
- Kalyan Kumar
- Udaykumar
- Mynavathi
- Bharathi
- Narasimharaju
