= Koodi Balona =

- Directed by: M. R. Vittal
- Produced by: Shivalingaiah
- Starring: Vishnuvardhan; Bhavani; Loknath; T. N. Balakrishna
- Cinematography: T. G. Shekhar
- Music by: G. K. Venkatesh
- Release date: 1975
- Country: India
- Language: Kannada

Koodi Balona is a 1975 Indian Kannada film, directed by M. R. Vittal and produced by Shivalingaiah. The film stars Vishnuvardhan, Bhavani, Loknath and T. N. Balakrishna in the lead roles. The film has musical score by G. K. Venkatesh.

== Cast ==
- Vishnuvardhan
- Bhavani
- Loknath
- T. N. Balakrishna
- Dwarakish
- Leelavathi
