= Pazhani (1965 film) =

- Theatrical release poster
- Directed by: A. Bhimsingh
- Written by: M. S. Solaimalai (dialogues)
- Screenplay by: A. Bhimsingh
- Story by: G. V. Iyer
- Based on: Bhoodana (Kannada)
- Produced by: A. P. Chinnappan
- Starring: Sivaji Ganesan; S. S. Rajendran; R. Muthuraman; Devika
- Cinematography: G. Vittal Rao
- Edited by: Thirumalai; A. Paul Duraisingh
- Music by: Viswanathan–Ramamoorthy
- Production company: Bharathamatha Pictures
- Release date: 14 January 1965
- Running time: 168 minutes
- Country: India
- Language: Tamil

Pazhani is a 1965 Indian Tamil-language drama film directed by A. Bhimsingh. The film stars Sivaji Ganesan, S. S. Rajendran, R. Muthuraman and Devika. It was released on 14 January 1965. The film was a critical success and won the National Film Award for Best Feature Film in Tamil under the Certificate of Merit category. It is a remake of the 1962 Kannada film Bhoodana.

== Cast ==
- Sivaji Ganesan as Pazhani
- S. S. Rajendran as Raju
- R. Muthuraman as Muthu
- T. S. Balaiah as Pannaiyar
- Devika as Kaveri
- M. R. Radha
- Nagesh as Sandhanam
- Sriram as Velu
- Pushpalatha as Emily
- Sivakami as Velu's wife

== Production ==
Pazhani does not have any actors credited in the opening titles; it only displays the credits of technicians.

== Soundtrack ==
The soundtrack was composed by Viswanathan–Ramamoorthy. Kannadasan wrote the song "Annan Ennada" at a time when he believed his brothers had abandoned him.

Track listing
No.	Title	Singer(s)	Length
1.	"Aarodum Mannil"	T. M. Soundararajan, Sirkazhi Govindarajan, P. B. Srinivas
2.	"Annan Ennada"	T. M. Soundararajan
3.	"Ullathukkule"	P. Susheela, T. M. Soundararajan
4.	"Vatta Vatta"	Sirkazhi Govindarajan, P. Susheela
5.	"Idhayam Irukkindrathe"	T. M. Soundararajan
6.	"Annachi"	Sirkazhi Govindarajan, T. M. Soundararajan, S. C. Krishnan, A. L. Raghavan, K. R. S. Samy, L. R. Eswari

== Release and reception ==
Pazhani was released on 14 January 1965. T. M. Ramachandran in Sport and Pastime wrote, "The slow pace at which the story progresses takes away much from the film’s quality and appeal but one cannot, while making a true art film, avoid this in depicting the humdrum life of a peasant and his family". The film received the National Film Award for Best Feature Film in Tamil under the Certificate of Merit category.

== Bibliography ==
- Dhananjayan, G. (2014). Pride of Tamil Cinema: 1931–2013. Blue Ocean Publishers. OCLC 898765509.
