= Jenu Goodu =

- Directed by: Y. R. Swamy
- Produced by: T. Vasanna; S. Heera
- Starring: K. S. Ashwath; Udaykumar; Rajashankar; Pandari Bai
- Cinematography: R. Madhu
- Edited by: P. S. Murthy
- Music by: Vijaya Krishnamurthy
- Production company: Sri Saraswathi Chithra
- Distributed by: Sri Saraswathi Chithra
- Release date: 1963
- Country: India
- Language: Kannada

Jenu Goodu ( transl. Beehive) is a 1963 Indian Kannada language film directed by Y. R. Swamy and produced by T. Vasanna and S. Heera. The film stars K. S. Ashwath, Udaykumar, Rajashankar and Pandari Bai in lead roles. Jayanthi and Chandrakala made their Kannada debuts with this film. The musical score was composed by Vijaya Krishnamurthy.

The film is a remake of the 1954 Bengali film Bhanga Gara, which was based on the novel Bijila by Prabhavathi Devi Saraswathi. The Bengali film was also remade in Tamil as Kula Dheivam and in Hindi as Bhabhi. Pandari Bai reprised her role in the Tamil and Hindi versiona, but not in the Bengali original.

== Cast ==
- K. S. Ashwath as Raghanna
- Udaykumar as Rajanna
- Pandari Bai as Shantha
- Rajashankar as Nagaraj
- T. N. Balakrishna as a stage actor
- Narasimharaju as a stage actor
- M. N. Lakshmi Devi as Mangala
- Jayanthi as Tara
- Shivaraj
- B. K. Eshwarappa
- H. R. Shastry as Raghanna's uncle
- Suryakumar
- Chandrakala as Latha
- M. Jayashree as Sharada
- G. M. Nanjappa
- Comedian Guggu as a moneylender
- Gopi as Kittu (credited as Master Gopi)
- A. M. Shivaji
- Sorat Ashwath as Raghanna's father
- K. Seethapathi as Seethapathi, doctor
- Rathnakar as young Raghanna
- Ramabai as Kallavva
