= Kalitharu Henne =

- Poster
- Directed by: N. C. Rajan
- Produced by: Jaya Balakrishna
- Starring: Rajkumar; Leelavathi; Advani Lakshmi Devi; R. Nagendra Rao
- Cinematography: K. Janakiram
- Music by: G. K. Venkatesh
- Release date: 1963
- Country: India
- Language: Kannada

Kalitharu Henne is a 1963 Indian Kannada-language film, directed by N. C. Rajan and produced by Jaya Balakrishna. The film stars Rajkumar, Leelavathi, Advani Lakshmi Devi and R. Nagendra Rao. The film has musical score by G. K. Venkatesh. The film was produced by actor T. N. Balakrishna marking his debut as independent producer. He also wrote the dialogues and worked as the assistant director of the movie. The movie was based on the short story Gowdthi Girijavva written by Balakrishna's wife Jaya. While Advani Lakshmidevi was paired opposite Rajkumar, Leelavathi played his younger brother's wife.

== Cast ==
- Rajkumar
- Leelavathi
- Advani Lakshmi Devi
- R. Nagendra Rao
