= Kalaavati =

- Directed by: T. V. Singh Takur
- Written by: Indirathanaya (dialogues)
- Screenplay by: Shailashree Sahithya Vrunda
- Story by: A. C. Narasimha Murthy; T. Dwarakanath
- Produced by: T. Dwarakanath; A. Vasudeva Rao
- Starring: Udaykumar; Balakrishna; Narasimharaju; Vijayarao
- Cinematography: B. Dorairaj
- Edited by: Venkatram; Raghupathi
- Music by: G. K. Venkatesh; Lakshman Berlekar
- Production company: Krishnodya Chithra
- Distributed by: Krishnodya Chithra
- Release date: 19 February 1964
- Running time: 145 min
- Country: India
- Language: Kannada

Kalaavati is a 1964 Indian Kannada film directed by T. V. Singh Thakur and produced by T. Dwarakanath and A. Vasudeva Rao. The film stars Udaykumar, Balakrishna, Narasimharaju, and Vijayarao in the lead roles. The film's musical score was composed by G. K. Venkatesh and Lakshman Berlekar.

== Cast ==
- Udaykumar as Suresh
- Balakrishna as Balakrishna Sanjeevini
- Narasimharaju as Boregowda
- Vijayarao
- T. Dwarakanath
- Sheshappa
- Sridhar
- Master Udayashankar
- Comedian Guggu as Linganna
- Bhaskar
- Jayanthi as Vanaja
- Advani Lakshmi Devi as Maya
- M. Jayashree as Puttamma, Vanaja's mother
- Latha as Kala

== Soundtrack ==
The music was composed by G. K. Venkatesh.

| No. | Song | Singers | Lyrics | Length (m:ss) |
|---|---|---|---|---|
| 1 | "Kuhu Kuhoo" | Manna Dey | Ku. Vem. Pu | 03:09 |
| 2 | "Odanadi Bekendu" | Suman Kalyanpur | Betageri Krishna Sharma | 03:13 |
| 3 | "Odandi Bekuendu" | P. B. Sreenivas | Chi. Udaya Shankar | 03:13 |
