= Manege Banda Mahalakshmi =

- Directed by: R. Govindaiah; B. Vitthalacharya
- Produced by: Raj Gopal
- Starring: Kalyan Kumar; K. S. Ashwath; Revathi; Mynavathi
- Cinematography: Debri M. S. Mani
- Music by: Rajan–Nagendra
- Production company: Manjunatha Productions
- Distributed by: Manjunatha Productions
- Release date: 1959
- Country: India
- Language: Kannada

Manege Banda Mahalakshmi is a 1959 Indian Kannada film, directed by R. Govindaiah and produced by Raj Gopal. The film stars Kalyan Kumar, K. S. Ashwath, Revathi and Mynavathi in the lead roles. The film has musical score by Rajan–Nagendra.

== Cast ==
- Kalyan Kumar
- K. S. Ashwath
- Revathi
- Mynavathi
