= Gowri Ganda =

- Directed by: Sundara Rao Nadakarni
- Produced by: Sundara Rao Nadakarni
- Starring: Narasimharaju; Mynavathi; Raja shankar B. Jaya
- Cinematography: D. V. Rajaram
- Music by: Thare Ganesh
- Release date: 1968
- Country: India
- Language: Kannada

Gowri Ganda is a 1968 Indian Kannada film, directed and produced by Sundara Rao Nadakarni. The film stars Narasimharaju, Mynavathi, Raja Shankar and B. Jaya in the lead roles. The film has musical score by Thare Ganesh.

== Cast ==
- Narasimharaju
- Mynavathi
- Raja Shankar
- B. Jaya
- Sarasa
