= Bhoodana =

1962 Indian Kannada–language film

- Directed by: P. S. Gopalakrishna; G. V. Iyer
- Written by: G. V. Iyer
- Screenplay by: G. V. Iyer
- Produced by: P. S. Gopalakrishna; G. V. Iyer
- Starring: Rajkumar; Kalyan Kumar; Udaykumar; K. S. Ashwath
- Cinematography: B. Dorairaj
- Edited by: Rajan
- Music by: G. K. Venkatesh
- Production company: Ananthlakshmi Pictures
- Distributed by: Ananthlakshmi Pictures
- Release date: 1962
- Country: India
- Language: Kannada

Bhoodana is a 1962 Indian Kannada-language film jointly directed and produced by G. V. Iyer and P.S. Gopalkrishna. The film stars Rajkumar, Kalyan Kumar, Udaykumar, and K. S. Ashwath, with a musical score by G. K. Venkatesh.

The film features Rajkumar, Kalyan Kumar and Udaykumar in full-fledged roles together for the only time in their careers. While all three were previously cast in Gaali Gopura, Udaykumar's role was limited to a special appearance in that film which also did not feature any sequence of all three together. Additionally, Bhoodana is the only film in which Rajkumar portrayed the father of both Kalyan Kumar and Udaykumar, and the only film in which Leelavathi played Rajkumar's daughter.

The theme of Bhoodana is inspired by Vinoba Bhave's Bhoodan movement and also draws from the novel Chomana Dudi by K. Shivaram Karanth. The film addresses the religious conversion of marginalized groups. S. K. Bhagavan, who worked as an assistant director on this film, revealed that the filmmakers approached Karanth to obtain the rights to Chomana Dudi for a direct adaptation. Karanth declined to sell the copyrights but permitted them to make a film inspired by the story.

The film was remade in Tamil in 1965 as Pazhani, directed by A. Bhimsingh and starring Sivaji Ganesan.

== Cast ==
- Rajkumar as Dasanna
- Kalyan Kumar as Lachha
- Udaykumar as Rama
- G. V. Iyer as Landlord Laxmipathy
- K. S. Ashwath
- Narasimharaju
- Balakrishna
- H. R. Shastry
- Veerabhadrappa
- Bharadwaj
- Kupparaj
- Mahalinga Bhagavathar
- Narayanaswamy
- Murthy
- Leelavathi
- Advani Lakshmi Devi
- Shakunthala
- Vijayakumari
- Jayalakshmi
