= Sati Nalaayini =

- Directed by: T.R. Gopu
- Story by: Hunsur Krishnamurthy
- Produced by: Kamadhenu Films
- Starring: Rajkumar; Pandari Bai
- Cinematography: C. J. Mohan Rao
- Music by: K. T. Kumaraswamy
- Release date: 1957
- Country: India
- Language: Kannada

Sati Nalaayini is a 1957 Indian Kannada-language film directed by T. R. S. Gopu. The film stars Rajkumar and Pandari Bai.

== Cast ==
- Rajkumar as Kaushikha
- Pandari Bai as Nalaayini
- H. R. Shastry as Shiva
- M. Jayashree as Parvati
- Narasimharaju
- Mynavathi
- Siddaiah Swamy
- Sharadambal
