= Santha Sakku =

Kannada language film

Santha Sakku is a Kannada language film of 1955. The film was produced by Sri Panduranga Productions.

== Cast ==
- B. Hanumanthachar
- Pandaribai
- Mynavathi (Debut)
- Vimalananda Das
- M. Prabhakara Rao
- Annapoornamma
- Madhava Rao
- Rama Bai

== Production ==
The film was produced by Pandari Bai under the banner Sri Panduranga Productions. The film was directed by Krishnan-Panju. Screenplay and dialogues were by S. L. N. Simha while R. Sampath handled the Cinematography. The film was dubbed into Tamil with the title Santha Sakkubai and released in 1956.

== Sound track ==
Music was composed by G. Govindarajulu Naidu. M. K. Athmanathan wrote the lyrics for the Tamil version.
