= Bhookailasa (film) =

1958 film

- Directed by: K. Shankar
- Written by: K. R. Seetharama Sastry (lyrics)
- Produced by: A. V. Meiyappan
- Starring: Rajkumar; Kalyan Kumar; B. Saroja Devi
- Cinematography: Madhava Bulbule
- Edited by: K. Shankar; K. Narayanan
- Music by: R. Sudarsanam; R. Govardhanam
- Distributed by: AVM Productions
- Release date: 5 February 1958
- Running time: 158 minutes
- Country: India
- Language: Kannada

Bhookailasa is a 1958 Indian Kannada language film directed by K. Shankar and produced by A. V. Meiyappan under the banner of AVM Productions. It stars Rajkumar, Kalyan Kumar and K. S. Ashwath in pivotal roles. The movie is a depiction of the legend prevalent in Gokarna, Karnataka and is also referred to as Gokarna Mahakshetra. It is based on the famous Kannada stage play Bhookailasa by Sri Sahitya Samrajya Nataka Mandali of Mysore which A. V. Meiyappan had earlier adapted into the Telugu movie titled Bhookailas in 1940. A. V. Meiyappan also shot the movie simultaneously in Telugu as Bhookailas starring N. T. Rama Rao. Rajkumar was praised for bringing out Ravana's layered personality - his intelligence, strength, and sense of righteousness, while also depicting the arrogance and ambition that leads to his downfall.

== Cast ==
- Rajkumar as Ravana
- Kalyan Kumar as Narada
- Jamuna as Mandodari
- B. Saroja Devi as Parvati
- K. S. Ashwath as Shiva
- Siddayya Swamy as Indra
- Hemalatha as Kaikase
- B. Dasappa as Mantri
- S. V. Ranga Rao as Mayasura
- R. N. Magadi as Mantri
- Master Baji as Vinayaka
- Gurusiddayya Swami as Kumbhakarna
- Y. M. Chandraiah as Vibhishana
- B. Anil Kumar as Vishnu

== Soundtrack ==
The music was composed by R. Sudarshanam, R. Govardhanam and all song lyrics were written by K. R. Seetharama Sastry. Shastry, when challenged to summarize the entire Ramayana in a single song, wrote the song - Ramana avataara raghukula somana avataara.

Song No.	Song	Lyricist	Singer
1	"Ksheeraabdi Varadhaama"	K. R. Seetharama Sastry	M. L. Vasanthakumari
2	"Naakavane Nachisuva"	K. R. Seetharama Sastry	P. Susheela
3	"Jaya Jaya Mahaadeva Bhakthavathsala"	K. R. Seetharama Sastry	C. S. Jayaraman
4	"Sundaraanga Bandeneega"	K. R. Seetharama Sastry	P. Susheela
5	"Raamana Avathaara"	K. R. Seetharama Sastry	Sirkazhi Govindarajan
6	"Baaleya Hrudayava Avarisiruva"	K. R. Seetharama Sastry	P. Susheela, T. S. Bhagavathi
7	"Doora Neenaade"	K. R. Seetharama Sastry	P. Susheela, A. M. Rajah
8	"Ee Raathri Mahaaraathri"	K. R. Seetharama Sastry	P. Susheela
9	"Tharave Varadaana"	K. R. Seetharama Sastry	C. S. Jayaraman
10	"Ee Deha Moorudina"	K. R. Seetharama Sastry	A. P. Komala
