= Jagajyothi Basveshwara =

- Directed by: T. V. Singh Thakur
- Produced by: G. S. S. Murthy
- Starring: Honnappa Bhagavatar; Rajkumar; K. S. Ashwath; B. Saroja Devi; Narasimharaju; Balakrishna
- Cinematography: B. Dorairaj
- Edited by: N.C. Rajan; G. Venkataram
- Music by: G. K. Venkatesh
- Production company: Vikram-Paramount Studios
- Distributed by: Viswakala Chitra; Shashikala Chitra
- Release date: 1959
- Running time: 160 minutes
- Country: India
- Language: Kannada

Jagajyothi Basveshwara is a 1959 Indian Kannada-language film directed by T. V. Singh Thakur featuring actors Honnappa Bhagavatar, Rajkumar, K. S. Ashwath, B. Saroja Devi, Narasimharaju, Balakrishna in pivotal roles. The film is based on the life Basaveshwar, a philosopher and social reformer from Karnataka who lived in the 12th century A.D.

== Cast ==
- Honnappa Bhagavatar as Basava/Basavanna
- Rajkumar as King Bijjala
- B. Saroja Devi
- Sandhya
- K. S. Ashwath
- Narasimharaju as Veerabhadra
- Balakrishna
- G. V. Iyer
- H. R. Shastry
- Siddaiah Swamy
- Advani Lakshmi Devi
- Ramaadevi
- Padmini Priyadarshini

== Awards ==
- National Film Award for Best Feature Film in Kannada
