= Mamathe =

- Directed by: Y. R. Swamy
- Written by: Y. R. Swamy
- Produced by: S. Heerabai
- Starring: Kalyan Kumar; Leelavathi; B Vijayalakshmi; Narasimharaju
- Cinematography: R. Madhu
- Music by: Satyam
- Release date: 1968
- Country: India
- Language: Kannada

Mamathe is a 1968 Indian Kannada-language film, directed by Y. R. Swamy and produced by S. Heerabai. The film stars Kalyan Kumar, Leelavathi, B. Vijayalakshmi and Narasimharaju. The film has a musical score by Satyam.

== Cast ==
- Kalyan Kumar
- Leelavathi
- B. Vijayalakshmi
- Narasimharaju
- K. S. Ashwath
