= Anna Thamma =

- Directed by: K. S. L. Swamy (Ravi)
- Written by: Durai
- Produced by: N. Bhakta Vatsalan
- Starring: Kalyan Kumar; Kalpana; Leelavathi; Udaykumar
- Cinematography: Sanjeevi
- Music by: Vijaya Bhaskar
- Release date: 1968
- Country: India
- Language: Kannada

Anna Thamma is a 1968 Indian Kannada film, directed by K. S. L. Swamy (Ravi) and produced by N. Bhakta Vatsalan. The film stars Kalyan Kumar, Kalpana, Leelavathi and Udaykumar in the lead roles. The musical score was composed by Vijaya Bhaskar.

== Cast ==
- Kalyan Kumar
- Kalpana
- Leelavathi
- Udaykumar
