= Rayara Sose =

1957 Kannada film produced by Pandari Bai

- Directed by: R. Ramamurthy; K. S. Murthy
- Written by: P. Gundu Rao
- Produced by: Pandari Bai
- Starring: H. R. Shastry; Rajkumar; Pandari Bai; Kalyan Kumar; Mynavathi
- Cinematography: R. Sampath
- Edited by: R. Ramamurthy; R. Sriramayya
- Music by: R. Diwakara
- Distributed by: Sri Panduranga Productions
- Release date: 1957
- Running time: 96 minutes
- Country: India
- Language: Kannada

Rayara Sose is a 1957 Indian Kannada-language film produced by Pandari Bai and directed by R. Ramamurthy and K. S. Murthy. It stars Rajkumar, Kalyan Kumar, Mynavathi, H. Ramachandra Shastry, Pandari Bai and Ramadevi. The music of the film was composed by R. Diwakara. This movie has S. Janaki's first released Kannada film song Thaalalentho Shokavega. The movie speaks against the evil practice of dowry. This is Rajkumar's first social drama movie. The movie was based on a Marathi play. The film did not do as well as expected.

== Cast ==
- H. Ramachandra Shastry as Aravind's father
- Kalyan Kumar as Aravind
- Dr. Rajkumar as Dr. Govind
- Pandari Bai as Geetha, Dr. Govind's wife
- Narasimharaju as Ganapa
- Balakrishna
- Mynavathi as Lakshmi, Aravind's wife
- M. Jayashree as Gowri, Aravind's mother
- Ramadevi as Ganapa's mother
- M. N. Lakshmi Devi
- Padmini Priyadarshini

== Soundtrack ==
The music of the film was composed by R. Diwakar with lyrics penned by Gundu Rao. This is the first released Kannada film with a song of playback singer S. Janaki.

Track#	Song	Singer(s)	Duration
1	"Baare Sundari"	A. M. Rajah	2:50
2	"Duddidu Yee Duddidu"	P. Nageshwara Rao	2:38
3	"Omkara Naaraayani"		
4	"Raaja Vaibhavavanne Thrunavendu"		
5	"Thaalalenthu Shokaavega"	S. Janaki	
6	"Sathyavembude Snaana"		
