= Pravasi Mandira =

- Directed by: Kalyan Kumar
- Produced by: Kalyan Kumar
- Starring: Kalyan Kumar; Vandhana; R. N. Sudarshan
- Cinematography: R N Krishna Prasad
- Music by: Rajan–Nagendra
- Release date: 1968
- Country: India
- Language: Kannada

Pravasi Mandira is a 1968 Indian Kannada film, directed and produced by Kalyan Kumar. The film stars Kalyan Kumar, Vandhana and R. N. Sudarshan in lead roles. The film had musical score by Rajan–Nagendra.

== Cast ==
- Kalyan Kumar
- Vandhana
- R. N. Sudarshan
