= Gaali Gopura =

- CD cover
- Directed by: B. R. Panthulu
- Written by: M. S. Solamalai
- Produced by: B. R. Panthulu
- Starring: Rajkumar; Kalyan Kumar; Leelavathi; M. V. Rajamma; R. Nagendra Rao; Balakrishna; Narasimharaju
- Cinematography: Subba Rao
- Edited by: R. Devaraj
- Music by: T. G. Lingappa
- Production company: Padmini Pictures
- Release date: 7 February 1962
- Running time: 161 minutes
- Country: India
- Language: Kannada

Gaali Gopura is a 1962 Kannada-language film directed and produced by B. R. Panthulu. The film stars Rajkumar, Kalyan Kumar, Leelavathi and R. Nagendra Rao, with Udaya Kumar making a brief guest appearance. Well-known future director Puttanna Kanagal served as an assistant to Panthulu during this film's production.

The original score and soundtrack were composed by T. G. Lingappa, with lyrics primarily written by G. V. Iyer. The film's soundtrack features a rendition of Purandara Dasa composition Yaarige Yaaruntu, sung by Ghantasala, which became widely popular. B. R. Panthulu simultaneously made a Telugu version titled Gaali Medalu, starring N. T. Rama Rao. Both the versions were commercially successful.

This film marked the first appearance of Rajkumar, Kalyan Kumar and Udaykumar together, though Udaykumar's role was limited to a special appearance. Later that year, the trio played full-fledged roles together for the only time in their careers in Bhoodana.

The film was remade in Malayalam in 1964 as Kalanjukittiya Thankam by Puttanna Kanagal, who had assisted B. R. Panthulu on the original production.

== Cast ==
- Rajkumar as Krishna
- Kalyan Kumar as Mohan
- Leelavathi as Lakshmi
- M. V. Rajamma as Shantha, Krishna's foster mother & Mohan's birth mother
- Dikki Madhava Rao as Naganna, Lakshmi's Father
- Chindodi Leela as Nimmi, Mohan's wife
- R. Nagendra Rao as Govindaiah, Krishna's foster father & Mohan's birth father
- Narasimharaju as Mohan's friend
- Balakrishna as Zamindar Kapinipathi & Nimmi's father
- K.S. Ashwath as Ranganna, Krishna's birth father
- M. N. Lakshmi Devi as Hotelier
- B. Ramadevi as Subbamma, Nimmi's mother
- Udayakumar in a special appearance. In a scene where he plays an egoistic rich person. After getting off a bus, he gives his small handbag to Krishna(Rajkumar) to carry it to the taxi stand.

== Soundtrack ==
The music was composed by T. G. Lingappa, lyrics by G. V. Iyer.

Track listing
No.	Title	Lyrics	Singer(s)	Length
1.	"Baale Bangaara"	G. V. Iyer	Renuka	03:21
2.	"Anuraagade Nee"	G. V. Iyer	P. B. Sreenivas, P. Susheela	03:17
3.	"Nanyaake Nee Hange"	G. V. Iyer	Ghantasala, Renuka
4.	"Dhooliyayithu Gaali Gopura"	Vijaya Narasimha	J. V. Raghavulu	03:25
5.	"Neene Kiladi Hennu"	G. V. Iyer	Peethapuram Nageswara Rao, K. Rani	02:45
6.	"Yaarige Yaaruntu"	Purandara Dasa	Ghantasala	03:05
