= Mahathma Kabir =

- Directed by: P. Srinivas
- Written by: P. Srinivas
- Screenplay by: P. Srinivas
- Produced by: T N Reddy
- Starring: Rajkumar; Krishnakumari; Udaykumar; T. D. Kusalakumari
- Cinematography: K Janakiram
- Edited by: M A Perumal
- Music by: A. Anasuyadevi
- Production company: Sarvodaya Chithra
- Distributed by: Sarvodaya Chithra
- Release date: 15 September 1962
- Running time: 118 min
- Country: India
- Language: Kannada

Mahathma Kabir is a 1962 Indian Kannada-language biographical film, directed by P. Srinivas and produced by T N Reddy on mystic saint Kabir Das. The film stars Rajkumar, Krishnakumari, Udaykumar and T. D. Kusalakumari. The movie had musical score by A.Anasuyadevi – making it the first instance of a female music director in Kannada cinema.

== Cast ==
- Rajkumar
- Krishnakumari
- Udaykumar
- T. D. Kusalakumari
- Balakrishna
- M. N. Lakshmi Devi
- M. Sathyanarayana
- Desaraja Ramarao
- Rajendra Krishna
- Kashinath
- Srikanth
- Raghunandan
- Mahalinga Bhagavathar
- S. M. Veerabhadrappa
- Hanumantha Rao
- A. M. Shivaji
- Bhujanga Rao
- P. S. Mani
- Sundar Rao
- M. Jayashree
- H. P. Saroja
- Papamma
- Sharada
- Baby Chandrakala
- Shobhan Babu
- Chi Sadashivaiah in Guest appearance
- G. S. Narayan in Guest appearance
- Suchithra in Guest appearance
- Baby Seetha
