= Daiva Leele =

- Directed by: C. S. Krishna Kumar
- Produced by: R. T. Arasu
- Starring: Kalyan Kumar; Sowkar Janaki; T. N. Balakrishna
- Cinematography: B. Dorai Raj
- Music by: B. M. S. Murthy
- Release date: 1962
- Country: India
- Language: Kannada

Daiva Leele is a 1962 Indian Kannada film, directed by C. S. Krishna Kumar and produced by R. T. Arasu. The film stars Kalyan Kumar, Sowkar Janaki and T. N. Balakrishna. The film has musical score by B. M. S. Murthy.

== Cast ==
- Kalyan Kumar
- Sowkar Janaki
- T. N. Balakrishna
