= Dharma Vijaya =

- VCD cover
- Directed by: N. Jagannath
- Written by: Sorat Ashwath
- Produced by: T. Madar
- Starring: Rajkumar; Narasimharaju; Siddayyaswamy; Sadashivaiah
- Cinematography: N. S. Verma
- Edited by: M. Thathayya
- Music by: G. K. Venkatesh
- Production company: H. M. Baba Productions
- Release date: 7 August 1959
- Running time: 139 minutes
- Country: India
- Language: Kannada

Dharma Vijaya is a 1959 Indian Kannada-language film, directed by N. Jagannath and produced by T. Madar. The film stars Rajkumar, Narasimharaju, Siddayyaswamy and Sadashivaiah. The film has musical score by G. K. Venkatesh. Midway through the movie, M. R. Vittal assumed the responsibilities of directing the movie and completed the shoot though he refused to be credited as the director.

== Cast ==
- Rajkumar as Saradara Vijaya
- Narasimharaju as Kaushika
- Siddayyaswamy
- Sadashivaiah
- Sorat Ashwath
- Krishna Shastry
- H. R. Shastry
- Mahalinga Bhagavathar
- Vasudeva Girimaji
- Hanumantha Rao
- Vadiraj
- Madhu
- Master Venkatesh
- Rathnakar
- Ramarao
- M. N. Aradhya
- Harini as Saradara Vijaya's wife
- Hemalatha
- Leelavathi
- Geetha
- Lakshmi
- Rajalakshmi
