= Nagakannika =

- Directed by: G. Vishwanathan
- Produced by: Shankar Singh
- Starring: M. Jayashree; Pratima Devi; G. R. Sandow; Bellary Ratnamala
- Cinematography: B. Dorai
- Music by: Palavangudi Shamy Iyer
- Production company: Mahatma Pictures
- Release date: 1949
- Running time: 172 minutes
- Country: India
- Language: Kannada

Nagakannika is a 1949 Indian Kannada film directed by G. Vishwanathan. The film stars Prathima Devi, M. Jayashree and G. W. Sandow in lead roles. It was the first folk-based film in Kannada. The film was successful at the box office.

== Cast ==
- M. Jayashree
- Pratima Devi
- G.R.Sandow
- Bellary Ratnamala
