= Lawyer Magalu =

- Directed by: G. V. Iyer
- Screenplay by: G. V. Iyer
- Produced by: G. V. Iyer
- Starring: Kalyan Kumar; Udaykumar; B Vijayalakshmi; T. N. Balakrishna
- Cinematography: B. Dorai Raj
- Music by: G. K. Venkatesh
- Release date: 1963
- Country: India
- Language: Kannada

Lawyer Magalu is a 1963 Indian Kannada-language film, directed and produced by G. V. Iyer. The film stars Kalyan Kumar, Udaykumar, B. Vijayalakshmi and T. N. Balakrishna in the lead roles. The film has musical score by G. K. Venkatesh.

== Cast ==
- Kalyan Kumar
- Udaykumar
- B. Vijayalakshmi
- T. N. Balakrishna
