= Mutthaide Bhagya (1956 film) =

- Directed by: B. Vittalacharya
- Written by: Gouthama
- Screenplay by: Gouthama
- Produced by: B. Vittalacharya
- Starring: Mynavathi; M. Jayashree; Revathi; Ramadevi
- Cinematography: M. S. Mani
- Edited by: P. S. Murthy
- Music by: Rajan–Nagendra
- Production company: Vittal Productions
- Distributed by: Vittal Productions
- Release date: 1956
- Country: India
- Language: Kannada

Mutthaide Bhagya is a 1956 Indian Kannada film, directed and produced by B. Vittalacharya. The film stars Mynavathi, M. Jayashree, Revathi and Ramadevi in the lead roles. The film has musical score by Rajan–Nagendra.

== Cast ==
- Mynavathi as Vidyavati
- M. Jayashree as Gowri
- Revathi
- Ramadevi
- Kalyan Kumar
- Hunsur Krishnamurthy
- Balakrishna as Gundurao
- H. R. Shastry
- Girimaji
- Dasappa
- Master Hirannaiah
- Comedian Guggu
