= Bangari (1963 film) =

- Directed by: G. V. Iyer
- Screenplay by: G. V. Iyer
- Produced by: G. V. Iyer
- Starring: Kalyan Kumar; B Vijayalakshmi; K. S. Ashwath; Narasimharaju
- Cinematography: B. Dorai Raj
- Music by: G. K. Venkatesh
- Release date: 1963
- Country: India
- Language: Kannada

Bangari is a 1963 Indian Kannada film, directed and produced by G. V. Iyer. The film stars Kalyan Kumar, B. Vijayalakshmi, K. S. Ashwath and Narasimharaju in the lead roles. The film has musical score by G. K. Venkatesh.

== Cast ==
- Kalyan Kumar
- B. Vijayalakshmi
- K. S. Ashwath
- Narasimharaju
