= Bhakta Prahlada (1958 film) =

1958 film

- Directed by: H. S. Krishnaswamy, Subbaiah Naidu
- Starring: Subbiaha Naidu, Udaykumar, K. S. Ashwath, Lokesh, Leelavathi
- Release date: 1958
- Running time: 179 minutes
- Country: India
- Language: Kannada

Bhakta Prahlada ( transl. Prahalada, the devotee) is a 1958 Indian black-and-white Kannada-language mythological drama film directed by H. S. Krishnaswamy and M. V. Subbaiah Naidu. The film stars Subbiaha Naidu, Udaykumar, K. S. Ashwath, Lokesh, Leelavathi, and Lakshmi Bhai. This film marked the debut of actor Lokesh as a child artist.
