= Mynavathi =

Indian Kannada actress (1935-2012)

- Born: M. Mynavathi; 26 July 1935; Bhatkal, Uttara Kannada district, Karnataka, India
- Died: 10 November 2012 (aged 77); Bangalore, India
- Occupation: Actress
- Years active: 1955–2012
- Spouse: Dr. S. Radhakrishna
- Children: 3
- Relatives: Pandari Bai (sister)

Mynavathi (26 July 1935 – 10 November 2012) was an Indian actress. She made her first screen appearance as an actor in the 1955 Kannada film Santa Sakhu and acted in over 100 Kannada films. She was the younger sister of another popular Kannada actress Pandari Bai. She became popular after her role in the 1959 Kannada film Abba Aa Hudugi, which co-starred Rajkumar and her sister Pandari Bai and was directed by H. L. N. Simha. In the film, she played the role of an autocratic girl who hates men. It was based on William Shakespeare's play The Taming of the Shrew.

== Career ==
After her debut in 1955, Mynavathi appeared in Bhakta Vijaya, Hari Bhakta and Rayara Sose, with Rajkumar playing the lead role in all three. She acted alongside other greats of Kannada cinema like Kalyan Kumar and Udaykumar, with Sivaji Ganesan in Tamil films. Her other popular films include Kacha Devayani, Naane Bhagyavathi, Anuraadha, Annapurna, Sarvajnamurthy, Amma, Muthaide Bhagya and Obbarigintha Obbaru. Launching "Yantra Media" in the 1980s with her sons, Mynavathi entered the television industry. She acted in the television serials Amma, Manetana, Mahayagna and Sumangali.

== Death ==
Mynavathi died on 10 November 2012.

== Filmography ==
=== Filmography ===
Year	Title	Role	Language	Notes
1953	Kangal		Tamil	Debut Film
1954	En Magal		Tamil	
1954	Ponvayal		Tamil	
1955	Santha Sakku		Kannada	Debut in Kannada
1956	Nalla Veedu		Tamil	
1956	Nannambikkai		Tamil	
1956	Kula Dheivam		Tamil	
1956	Bhakta Vijaya		Kannada	
1956	Hari Bhakta		Kannada	
1956	Muttaide Bhagya	Vidyavati	Kannada	
1956	Kacha Devayani		Kannada	
1957	Bettada Kalla		Kannada	
1957	Sati Nalaayini		Kannada	
1957	Rayara Sose	Lakshmi	Kannada	
1957	Pudhu Vayal		Tamil	
1957	Aaravalli		Tamil	
1958	Maalaiyitta Mangai		Tamil	
1958	Bommai Kalyanam	Kannamma	Tamil	
1958	Anbu Engey		Tamil	
1958	Naan Valartha Thangai		Tamil	
1958	Sengottai Singam		Tamil	
1958	Bommala Pelli	Bullemma	Telugu	
1959	Abba Aa Hudugi	Sharmishtha	Kannada	
1959	Manege Banda Mahalakshmi		Kannada	
1959	Kann Thirandhadhu		Tamil	
1959	Engal Kuladevi		Tamil	
1959	Vannakili		Tamil	
1959	Naalu Veli Nilam		Tamil	
1959	Kalyanikku Kalyanam	Kalyani	Tamil	
1960	Kuravanji		Tamil	
1960	Mahalakshmi		Tamil	
1960	Thanthaikku Pin Thamaiyan		Tamil	
1960	Anbukor Anni		Tamil	
1961	Malliyam Mangalam		Tamil	
1964	Annapoorna	Ashadevi	Kannada	
1964	Navajeevana		Kannada	
1965	Sarvagna Murthy		Kannada	
1965	Mahasathi Anasuya		Kannada	Cameo
1966	Subba Shastry		Kannada	
1967	Shri Purandaradasaru	Circus woman	Kannada	Cameo
1967	Anuradha	Anuradha	Kannada	
1968	Nane Bhagyavathi		Kannada	
1968	Gowri Ganda		Kannada	
1968	Aananda Kanda		Kannada	
1968	Amma		Kannada	
1969	Vichithra Samaara		Kannada	
1969	Gandondu Hennaru	Seetha	Kannada	
1970	Sri Krishnadevaraya		Kannada	
1970	Aparaajithe		Kannada	
1970	Muru Muttugalu		Kannada	
1971	Aliya Geleya		Kannada	
1974	Avalum Penn Thaane		Tamil	
1976	Mugiyada Kathe		Kannada	
1977	Bhagyavantharu	Gundu Rao's wife	Kannada	
1991	Gruhapravesha		Kannada	
1992	Mana Mecchida Sose	Savitri	Kannada	
1992	Prema Sangama		Kannada	
1992	Nanna Thangi		Kannada	
1993	Bhagavan Sri Saibaba	Pandaribai	Kannada	
1993	Manikantana Mahime		Kannada	
1993	Chirabandhavya		Kannada	
1993	Mangalya Bandhana	Vijay's mother	Kannada	
1994	Mutthanna		Kannada	
1996	Shiva Leele		Kannada	
1996	Geluvina Saradara		Kannada	
1998	Doni Sagali		Kannada	
2001	Sundara Neenu Sundari Naanu		Kannada	
2003	Preetisle Beku	Ganesha's grandmother	Kannada	
