= H. Ramachandra Shastry =

Indian musician

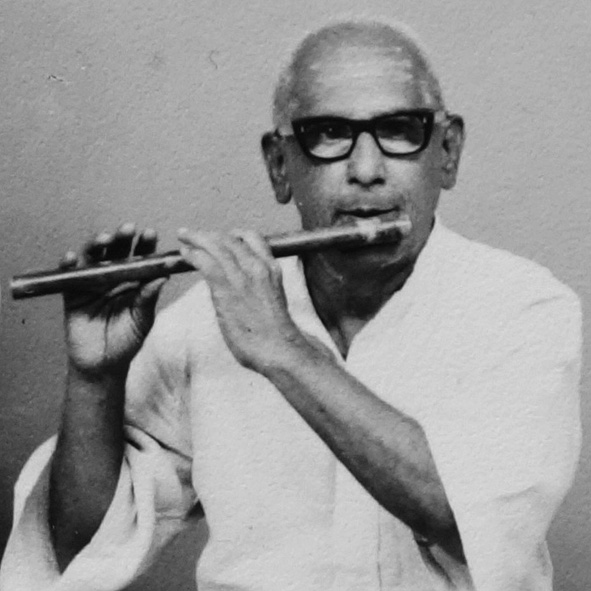
H. Ramachandra Shastry (Chennai 1978 private studio photo)

H. Ramachandra Shastry (1906 – 1992) was an Indian Carnatic flautist. He belonged to the bani (music school) of Sarabha Sastri and learned music from Palladam Sanjiva Rao, a direct disciple of Sastri].

Shastry taught Carnatic flute at Kalakshetra until 1992. G. S. Rajan, Ludwig Pesch and T Sashidhar are some of his disciples.
