= H. R. Shastry =

Indian Kannada actor (1905–1976)

- Shastry in Sri Srinivasa Kalyana (1974)
- Born: Halebeedu Ramachandra Shastry; 2 November 1905; Halebeedu, Pandavapura taluk, Mysore district, Kingdom of Mysore (now in Mandya district, Karnataka)
- Died: 12 December 1976 (aged 71)
- Occupations: Actor; dubbing artiste
- Years active: 1940–1976
- Children: 7
- Family: Vijaya Naarasimha (brother); Anu Prabhakar (great granddaughter)

Halebeedu Ramachandra Shastry (2 November 1905 – 12 December 1976) was an Indian actor and dubbing artist known for his work in Kannada cinema. In a career spanning more than 40 years, Shastry played a variety of supporting roles. He is noted for his performances in Bedara Kannappa (1954), Rayara Sose (1957), Bhoodana (1962), Sri Srinivasa Kalyana (1974) and Upasane (1974). Shastry's last movie was Pavana Ganga.

== Early life ==
Shastry was born on 2 November 1905 in Halebeedu village near Melukote, in the present-day Mandya district of Karnataka. His father was an astrologer. At five, Shastry was sent to study under the tutelage of Narasimha Somayaji, where he developed interest towards the Kannada language, culture and art. He was drawn towards theatre and acting during his secondary schooling at Sarada Vilas High School, Mysore. At 15, he started working at a railway workshop, while simultaneously pursuing his acting interest.

== Career ==
Shastry went on to perform for A. V. Varadachar's Rathnavali theatre group and subsequently that of Mohammed Peer. He was noted for his performances as a shepherd in Peer's Gautama Buddha, as Siddha in Samsara Nauke and Dildar in Shah Jahan. He then joined H. L. N. Simha theatre group, Simha's Selected Artists, before starting his own troupe named Manjunatheshwara Nataka Mandali. He suffered financial losses with the troupe leading him to focus energies on his already-begun film acting career.

Shastry made his film debut in Varadacharya's Bhakta Amabareesha which was made in Tamil. In 1941, he appeared in his first Kannada film Subhadra produced by Gubbi Veeranna where he played the role of Dharmaraya. Shastry played the role of deity Shiva in Bedara Kannappa (1954), a film that won the Certificate of Merit for the Best Feature Film in Kannada at the 2nd National Film Awards. He played the major role of a father-in-law who demands dowry, in 1957 social drama Rayara Sose, which was a commercial success. The Rajkumar-starrer Immadi Pulikeshi was his 100th film.

== Selected filmography ==
- Subhadra (1941)...Dharmaraya
- Mahatma Kabir (1947)
- Bedara Kannappa (1954)...Shiva
- Shiv Bhakta (1955)...Shiva
- Ohileshwara (1956)
- Bhakta Vijaya (1956)
- Sati Nalaayini (1957)...Shiva
- Rayara Sose (1957)
- Shree Krishna Gaarudi (1958)...Dharmaraya
- Jagajyothi Basveshwara (1959)
- Dharma Vijaya (1959)
- Ranadheera Kanteerava (1960)
- Bhakta Kanakadasa (1960)
- Aasha Sundari (1960)
- Dashavathara (film) (1960)...Dharmaraya
- Kaiwara Mahathme (1961)
- Bhakta Chetha (1961)
- Rathna Manjari (1962)
- Jenu Goodu (1963)
- Mantralaya Mahatme (1966)...Sudhindra tirtha
- Immadi Pulikeshi (1967)
- Hasiru Thorana (1970)
- Paropakari (1970)
- Bangaarada Manushya (1972)
- Naagarahaavu (1972)...Shyam Iyengar
- Doorada Betta (1973)
- Gandhada Gudi (1973)...Hanumayya
- Mooroovare Vajragalu (1973)...Sudhama
- Upasane (1974)
- Sri Srinivasa Kalyana (1974)
- Bangaarada Panjara (1974)
- Sampathige Savaal (1974)
- Bhakta Kumbara (1974)
- Mayura (film) (1975)...Eeshabhatta
- Pavana Ganga (1977)
