= Leelavathi (actress) =

Indian actress and producer (1937 – 2023)

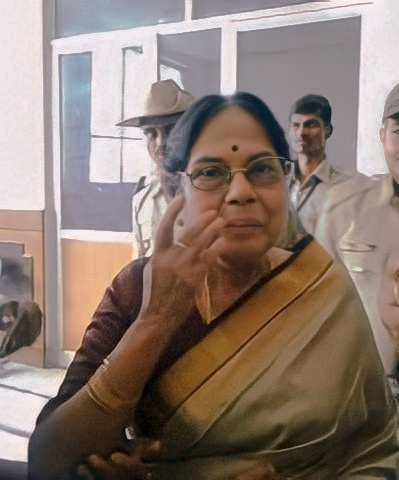
- Leelavathi at Kalamandira, Mysore
- Born: Leena Sequeira; 1937; Mangalore, Madras Province, British India
- Died: 8 December 2023 (aged 86); Nelamangala, Bangalore Rural district, Karnataka, India
- Occupations: Actress, film producer, writer, philanthropist
- Children: Vinod Raj

Leena Sequeira (1937 – 8 December 2023), known by her screenname Leelavathi, was an Indian actress and producer who worked predominantly in Kannada and Tamil films, in addition to Telugu, Malayalam, Hindi, and Tulu films. After starting in theatre, Leelavathi made her film debut in a small role as child artist in Nagakannika (1949). She went on to act in more than 600 films throughout her career spanning over five decades.

Leelavathi is known for many performances as a lead actress in films such as Rani Honnamma, Bhakta Kumbara, Valar Pirai, Mana Mecchida Madadi and Santha Thukaram. In the early 1970s, she switched towards performing character roles and was notable in films such as Gejje Pooje, Upasane, Naagarahaavu, Vasantha Geetha, Shravana Banthu and Eradu Nakshatragalu. She was the recipient of the Dr. Rajkumar Award in 1999 and Filmfare Awards.

== Early life ==
Leena Sequeira was born in Mura, a village in Belthangady town of Dakshina Kannada district in Karnataka which was then a part of Madras Presidency. She lost her parents at the age of 6. Leena and her sister Angelina Sequeira were raised under the care of their elder cousin. Both the sisters had a passion for dancing, and they both earned their living by training people in dance.

== Film career ==
Leelavathi had a small role in Chanchala Kumari and then in Shanker Singh's film Naga Kannika. She later joined the troupe of Mahalinga Bhagavathar's Sri Sahitya Samrajya Drama Company. She got a chance to act in Subbainaidu's 1958 movie Bhakta Prahlada and in movies like Mangalya Yoga, Dharma Vijaya and Ranadheera Kanteerava. It was from Rani Honnamma that Leelavathi became a full-fledged heroine and went on to act in many films as the leading female, like Santha Thukaram, Kantheredu Nodu, Kaivara Mahatme, Gaali Gopura, Kanyarathna, Kulavadhu, Veera Kesari and Mana Mecchida Madadi. She has also starred in key supporting roles in a large number of films and received the Karnataka State Award for Gejje Pooje and Doctor Krishna.

Leelavathi had the rare distinction of working with Rajkumar in various films as heroine as well as in other roles like daughter (Bhoodana), daughter-in-law (Kittur Chennamma), sister (Vathsalya), sister-in-law (elder brother's wife in Premamayi and younger brother's wife in Kalitharu Henne), paternal aunt (Shravana Banthu), and mother-in-law (Vasantha Geetha, Naa Ninna Mareyalare and Jwaalamukhi).

== Death ==
Leelavathi died at a private hospital in Nelamangala on the outskirts of Bengaluru, on 8 December 2023, at the age of 86.

== Awards and recognitions ==
- Dr. Rajkumar Lifetime Achievement Award in 2000 from the Karnataka Government.
- Filmfare Award for Best Supporting Actress – Kannada for Kannadada Kanda in 2006
- Leelavathi was conferred with the honorary doctorate from the Tumkur University in the year 2008 for her contribution to the southern cinema.

== Partial filmography ==
=== Kannada films ===
Year	Film	Role	Notes
1949	Nagakannika		
1953	Chanchala Kumari		
1958	Bhakta Prahlada		
1958	Mangalya Yoga		
1959	Abba Aa Hudugi		
1959	Dharma Vijaya		
1960	Dashavtara		
1960	Ranadheera Kanteerava		
1960	Rani Honnamma		
1961	Kaiwara Mahathme		
1961	Kantheredu Nodu		
1961	Kittur Chennamma	Veeravva	
1962	Gaali Gopura		
1962	Karuneye Kutumbada Kannu		
1962	Bhoodaana		
1962	Mana Mecchida Madadi		
1962	Nanda Deepa		
1962	Rani Chanamma		
1962	Rathna Manjari		
1962	Vidhi Vilasa		
1963	Kulavadhu		
1963	Kanyarathna		
1963	Kalitharu Henne		
1963	Bevu Bella		
1963	Jeevana Tharanga		
1963	Malli Maduve		
1963	Mana Mecchida Madadi		
1963	Santha Thukaram		National Award
1963	Valmiki		
1963	Veera Kesari		
1964	Shivarathri Mahathme		
1964	Thumbida Koda		State Award
1965	Chandrahasa		
1965	Mahasathi Anasuya		
1965	Ide Mahasudina		
1965	Maduve Madi Nodu		National Award
1965	Naga Pooja		
1965	Vathsalya		
1965	Veera Vikrama		With Udaya Kumar
1966	Mohini Bhasmasura		
1966	Premamayi		
1966	Thoogu Deepa		
1967	Gange Gowri		
1968	Anna Thamma		
1968	Attegondukala Sosegondukala		
1968	Bhagya Devathe		
1968	Mamathe		
1969	Kalpa Vruksha		
1969	Brindavana		
1969	Gejje Pooje		State Award
1970	Aaru Mooru Ombhatthu		
1970	Boregowda Bangalorige Banda		
1970	Aparajithe		
1970	Sukha Samsara		
1971	Signalman Siddappa		
1971	Sothu Geddavalu		
1971	Sharapanjara		
1972	Dharmapatni		
1972	Naagarahaavu		
1972	Sipayi Ramu		State Award
1972	Naa Mechida Huduga		
1973	Mooroovare Vajragalu		
1973	Premapasha		
1973	Sahadharmini		
1974	Bhakta Kumbara		
1974	Devara Gudi		
1974	Idu Namma Desha		
1974	Maga Mommaga		
1974	Maha Thyaga		
1974	Professor Huchuraya		
1974	Upasane		
1975	Bhagya Jyothi		
1975	Bili Hendthi		
1975	Hennu Samsarada Kannu		
1975	Hosilu Mettida Hennu		
1975	Koodi Balona		
1975	Katha Sangama	Kamala	
1975	Kalla Kulla		
1976	Bangarada Gudi		
1976	College Ranga		
1976	Makkala Bhagya		
1976	Naa Ninna Mareyalare		
1976	Phalitamsha		
1977	Deepa		
1977	Dhanalakshmi		
1977	Kumkuma Rakshe		
1977	Mugdha Manava		
1977	Veera Sindhoora Lakshmana		
1978	Devadasi		
1978	Kiladi Jodi		
1978	Hombisilu		
1978	Kiladi Kittu		
1978	Maathu Tappada Maga		
1978	Vasantha Lakshmi		
1979	Naa Ninna Bidalaare		
1979	Pakka Kalla		
1979	Savathiya Neralu		
1979	Vijay Vikram		
1980	Kulla Kulli		
1980	Nanna Rosha Nooru Varusha		
1980	Namma Mane Sose		
1980	Nyaya Neethi Dharma		
1980	Simha Jodi		
1980	Subbi Subakka Suvvalali		
1980	Ondu Hennu Aaru Kannu		
1980	Vasantha Geethe		
1981	Hana Balavo Jana Balavo		
1981	Edeyuru Siddhalingeshwara		
1981	Kula Puthra		
1981	Garjane		
1981	Thayiya Madilalli		
1981	Mareyada Haadu		
1982	Auto Raja		
1983	Eradu Nakshatragalu		
1983	Mududida Tavare Aralithu		
1983	Sididedda Sahodara		
1983	Samarpane		
1984	Endina Ramayana		
1984	Chanakya		
1984	Olavu Moodidaga		
1984	Shravana Banthu		
1985	Ajeya	Ajey's mother	
1985	Hosa Baalu		
1985	Balondu Uyyale		
1985	Naanu Nanna Hendthi		
1986	Bettada Thayi		
1986	Kathanayaka		
1986	KD No. 1		
1986	Mrigalaya		
1986	Seelu Nakshatra		
1987	Huli Hebbuli	Kamala	
1987	Olavina Udugore		
1987	Premaloka		
1988	Ramanna Shamanna		
1989	Abhimana		
1989	Doctor Krishna		Karnataka State Film Award for Best Supporting Actress
1989	Yuga Purusha		
1989	Gagana		
1990	Golmaal Radhakrishna		
1990	Tiger Gangu		
1991	Golmaal Radhakrishna II		
1999	Habba		
2000	Chamundi		
2003	Swathi Muthu		
2006	Kannadada Kanda		
2007	Shukra		
2009	Yaaradhu		

=== Other language films ===
Year	Film	Role	Language	Notes
1959	Raja Malaya Simha		Telugu/Tamil	
1962	Pattinathaar		Tamil	
1962	Sumaithaangi		Tamil	
1962	Valar Pirai		Tamil	
1963	Valmiki		Telugu	
1963	Bandipotu		Telugu	
1964	Marmayogi		Telugu	
1965	Karthigai Deepam		Tamil	
1966	Paduka Pattabhishekam	Kaikeyi	Telugu	
1974	Aval Oru Thodar Kathai	Parvathi	Tamil	
1974	Naan Avanillai	Chandrabai	Tamil	
1977	Avargal	Leelavathi	Tamil	
1977	Solah Shukrawar		Hindi	
1978	Gammathu Goodacharulu		Telugu	
1979	Karthika Deepam		Telugu	
1979	Idi Katha Kaadu		Telugu	
1980	Bhumi Par Aaye Bhagwan		Hindi	
1980	Jathara		Telugu	
1982	Maro Malupu		Telugu	
1986	Pudhir	Vijay's mother	Tamil	

=== As producer ===
Year	Film
1990	College Hero
2006	Kannadada Kanda
2007	Shukra
2009	Yaaradhu
