= T. N. Balakrishna =

Indian film actor (1911–1995)

- Born: 1911; Arsikere, Hassan; Kingdom of Mysore (Now Karnataka)
- Died: 19 July 1995 (aged 83–84); Bangalore, Karnataka, India
- Other name: Balanna
- Occupation: Actor
- Spouses: Sathyavathi; Sarojamma

Tirumakudalu Narasipura Balakrishna (1911 – 19 July 1995) was an Indian actor in Kannada cinema. He was said to have a hearing problem and some say that he was totally deaf. However, he would catch the lip movements of the artists and narrate the dialogues spontaneously. He was popular for his comic and villainous roles in films like Kantheredu Nodu (1961), Muriyada Mane (1964), Bangaarada Manushya (1972), Gandhada Gudi (1973) and Kaamana Billu (1983) and appeared in numerous versatile roles in over 100 films that starred Rajkumar in the lead role.

Balakrishna is known to have played the most roles in Kannada cinema, having appeared in over 560 films as a hero, villain, comedian, good Samaritan, loving father and lunatic. Sudha Chandran is his ex-daughter in law. She was married to Balakrishna's son B. Srinivas who was the associate director of her Kannada movie Bisilu Beladingalu (1989). Sudha Chandran later produced Balakrishna's biopic Kalabhimani (1989) which was directed by B. Srinivas.

== Early life ==
Balakrishna was born into a poor family in 1911 in Arsikere, Kingdom of Mysore (now Karnataka). When he was four years old, his mother sold him to a couple for just ₹8 in order to provide treatment for her ailing husband. He ran away from his adopted parents after having been treated badly.

In his later years, Balakrishna had lung cancer and finally succumbed to it on 19 July 1995. Yama Kinkara was his last film appearance.

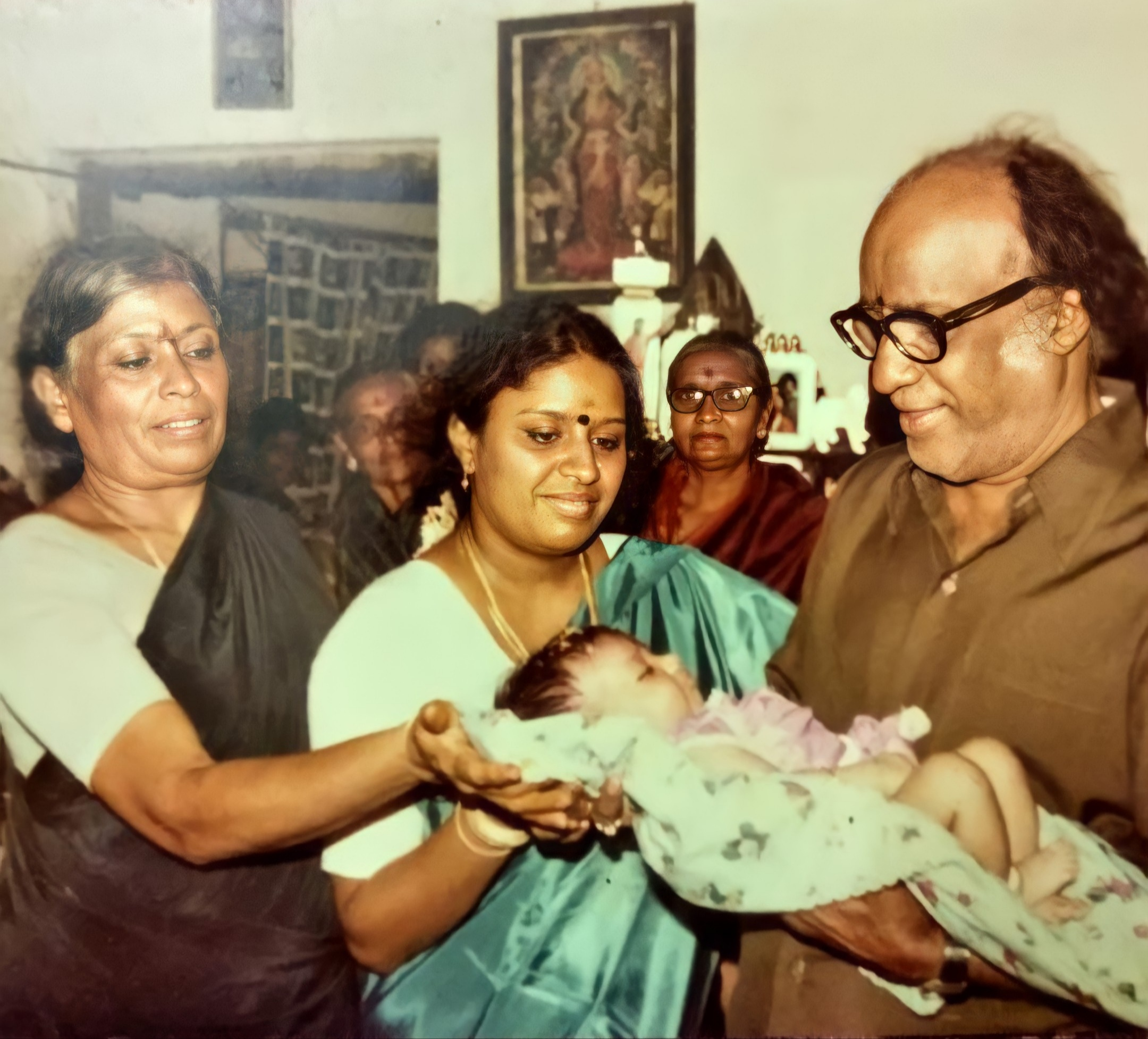
Balakrishna with his family

== Career ==
Balakrishna first acted in the play, Shri Rama Pattabhishekha, in 1929. Following this, he worked as the painter of the stage backdrops for a drama company before becoming a professional sign painter. Later, he became a ticket collector in a drama company for a meagre salary. He returned to acting in theatre with Lakshmasana Drama Company and then with Gowrishankar Nataka Mandali. Following this, he joined the drama company of Gubbi Veeranna, a notable theatre director during the time. Film director B. R. Panthulu happened to visit the drama company, saw his acting on stage and offered him a film role, beginning his career as a movie actor. He appeared as an antagonist in the film Kalachakra, a performance that was appreciated. He appeared in over a hundred Kannada films playing mostly comic roles, that starred Rajkumar.

In order to make the Kannada film industry self-reliant and save money for the producers, Balakrishna started the studio, investing all of his money and property. He built the Abhiman studio in Kengeri, Bangalore, on a 20-acre plot in 1963, but faced difficulties initially. When no Kannada films were being made, Balakrishna got together with other actors like Rajkumar and G. V. Iyer and produced the film Ranadheera Kanteerava. He even raised money from the public at ₹1 per person to build the studio. The studio was a failure, and Balakrishna died in penury. Television serials are still being shot at the studio today which is being looked after by Balakrishna's son, B. Ganesh and grandson Karthik. His final screen appearance came in Yama Kinkara (1995).

== Notable filmography ==
Year	Title	Role	Notes
1943	Radha Ramana		
1952	Dallali		
1954	Devasundari		
1954	Kanyadana		
1954	Muttiddella Chinna		
1955	Ashaadabhooti		
1955	Bhakta Mallikarjuna		
1956	Daiva Sankalpa		
1956	Mutthaide Bhagya	Gundurao	
1956	Pancharatna		
1956	Sadarame		
1957	Rayara Sose		
1957	Varadakshine	Seetharamaiah	
1958	School Master	Gundappa	
1958	Mane Thumbida Hennu	Sitapathi	
1958	Mangalya Yoga		
1958	Anna Thangi	Ramachandraiah	
1958	Bhakta Prahlada		
1959	Jagajyothi Basveshwara		
1960	Ranadheera Kanteerava	Appanna	
1960	Rani Honnamma		
1960	Shivalinga Sakshi		
1961	Kittur Chennamma	Harana Setty	
1961	Shri Shaila Mahathme		
1961	Kantheredu Nodu	Dasanna	
1961	Kaiwara Mahathme		
1961	Bhakta Chetha		
1961	Vijayanagarada Veeraputhra		
1962	Bhoodana		
1962	Gaali Gopura	Zamindar Kapinipathi	
1962	Karuneye Kutumbada Kannu	Balendra Mohana Kutike	
1962	Mahathma Kabir		
1962	Thejaswini		
1962	Daiva Leele		
1963	Jenu Goodu	Stage actor	
1963	Saaku Magalu	Dashavatharam	
1963	Nanda Deepa		
1963	Kanyarathna		
1963	Jeevana Tharanga		
1963	Kulavadhu		
1963	Veera Kesari		
1963	Mana Mecchida Madadi	Ramesh	
1963	Chandra Kumara	Timba	
1963	Lawyer Magalu		
1963	Santha Thukaram		
1964	Annapoorna	Kailas	
1964	Chandavalliya Thota	Kariyappa	
1964	Shivagange Mahathme		
1964	Muriyada Mane	Boregowda	
1964	Naandi	Sitapathi	
1964	Thumbida Koda	M. S. Ramdev	
1964	Post Master	Bellulli	
1964	Chinnada Gombe		
1964	Kavaleradu Kulavandu		
1964	Kalaavati	Balakrishna Sanjeevini	
1964	Mane Aliya	'Daskath' Danappa	
1965	Sarvagna Murthy		
1965	Mahasathi Anasuya	Kowshika	
1965	Mavana Magalu		
1965	Beratha Jeeva		
1965	Ide Mahasudina		
1966	Katari Veera		
1966	Bala Nagamma		
1966	Thoogudeepa		
1966	Mohini Bhasmasura	Narada	
1966	Badukuva Daari		
1967	Sathi Sukanya		
1967	Belli Moda	Puttaiah	
1967	Rajashekara	Vijayavarma	
1967	Bangarada Hoovu	Padmanabha Panditha	
1967	Chakra Theertha		
1967	Immadi Pulikeshi	Rahappa	
1967	Sri Purandara Dasaru	Bagalakote Balakrishnacharya	
1967	Padavidhara		
1968	Gejje Pooje		
1968	Gandhinagara		
1968	Bhagya Devathe		
1968	Bhagyada Bagilu	Gunda	
1968	Rowdy Ranganna	Siddappa	
1968	Manku Dinne	Hayavadana Rao	
1968	Hoovu Mullu		
1968	Mysore Tanga		
1969	Kappu Bilupu	Narasimha Murthy	
1969	Margadarshi	Chikkanarasappa	
1969	Gandondu Hennaru		
1969	Mallammana Pavaada	Rajivi's father	
1969	Punarjanma	Poojarappa	
1969	Uyyale	Seethapati	
1969	Chikkamma	Gundlupete Gundappa	
1969	Mayor Muthanna	Ranganath Rao	
1969	Maduve Maduve Maduve		
1969	Namma Makkalu		
1969	Odahuttidavaru		
1970	Sedige Sedu	Sitapathi	
1970	Bhale Jodi	Papachchi's father	
1970	Nanna Thamma		
1971	Sakshatkara	Laksmanayya	
1971	Kasturi Nivasa	Bhojarajaiah	
1971	Kula Gourava	Raghunatha Rao's personal secretary	
1971	Baala Bandhana		
1971	Namma Samsara	Military Narayana Swamy	
1971	Thayi Devaru	Ramasubbaiah	
1971	Pratidwani		
1971	Anugraha		
1971	Bhale Adrushtavo Adrushta	Ananthaiah	
1972	Bangarada Manushya	Raachutappa	
1972	Hrudaya Sangama	Daasappa	
1972	Nanda Gokula	Gudibande Ganesha Rao	
1973	Gandhada Gudi	Venkatappa Naika	
1973	Bidugade	Subba Rao	
1973	Swayamvara	Nanjundaiyya	
1973	Doorada Betta		
1973	Seethe Alla Savithri		
1973	Mane Belagida Sose		
1973	Mannina Magalu		
1974	Bhakta Kumbara	Sangya	
1974	Sampathige Saval	Puttayya	
1974	Bhootayyana Maga Ayyu	Singlayya a.k.a. Bundekyatha	
1974	Professor Huchuraya	Colonel Dhanley	
1974	Bangaarada Panjara	Seetharamaiah	
1974	Anna Attige	Chandru	
1974	Eradu Kanasu		
1974	Maga Mommaga		
1975	Thrimurthy	Seetharamaiah	
1975	Mayura	Madhukeshwara	
1975	Daari Tappida Maga	Prasad's father-in-law	
1975	Onde Roopa Eradu Guna	Kathri, Kittu	
1975	Mahadeshwara Pooja Phala		
1975	Beluvalada Madilalli		
1975	Mane Belaku		
1975	Kaveri		
1975	Koodi Balona		
1976	Premada Kanike	Madhavayya	
1976	Badavara Bandhu	Nagappa	
1976	Bahaddur Gandu	Dewan	
1976	Bayalu Daari	Govinda Rao	
1976	Devaru Kotta Vara		
1976	Hosilu Mettida Hennu		
1976	Raja Nanna Raja	Lawyer Hayavadan Rao	
1976	Naa Ninna Mareyalare	Sulibele Subbanna	
1976	Mugiyada Kathe		
1976	Devara Duddu		
1977	Sanaadi Appanna	Ayyanna	
1977	Bayasade Banda Bhagya	Gudibande Gunduraya	
1977	Sose Tanda Soubhagya		
1977	Shrimanthana Magalu	Military Subbanna	
1977	Sahodarara Savaal	Krishnappa	
1977	Shani Prabhava		
1977	Galate Samsara	Mahadevayya	
1977	Olavu Geluvu	Narasimhaiah	
1977	Bhagyavantharu	Mahadevayya	
1977	Pavana Ganga	Sampanna	
1978	Sneha Sedu		
1978	Shankar Guru	Lakshman Rao	
1978	Thayige Thakka Maga	Ramanagara Kuppuswamy	
1978	Kiladi Kittu	Muttanna	
1978	Vamsha Jyothi	Devayya	
1978	Maathu Tappada Maga	Rachappa	
1978	Vasantha Lakshmi		
1978	Madhura Sangama	Mala's foster father	
1979	Naa Ninna Bidalaare	Gayatri's father	
1979	Preethi Madu Thamashe Nodu	Hanumantha Rao	
1979	Naniruvude Ninagagi	Vijay's Father	
1979	Nentaro Gantu Kallaro		
1979	Huliya Haalina Mevu	Uttanayaka	
1979	Asadhya Aliya	Krishnappa	
1980	Ondu Hennu Aaru Kannu	Pappanna	
1980	Moogana Sedu		
1980	Maria My Darling	Krishnappa	
1980	Auto Raja	Dr Dinakar	
1980	Biligiriya Banadalli		
1980	Rahasya Rathri		
1980	Kulla Kulli	Venkateshaiah	
1981	Thayiya Madilalli	Ramayya	
1981	Nee Nanna Gellalare	Hayavadana Rao	
1981	Guru Shishyaru	Virupaksha Shastri	
1981	Bhagyavantha		
1981	Anupama	Govindaiah	
1981	Jeevakke Jeeva		
1982	Praya Praya Praya		
1982	Mullina Gulabi		
1983	Kaamana Billu		
1983	Kaviratna Kalidasa	Gunasagara	
1983	Hosa Theerpu	Radha's Grandfather	
1983	Benkiya Bale		
1983	Ibbani Karagithu	Rangappa	
1983	Anveshane	Ajja	
1984	Madhuve Madu Tamashe Nodu	Neelakhantha Shastri	
1984	Apoorva Sangama	Bhujanga	
1984	Rudranaga	Harishchandra	
1984	Gajendra		
1984	Gandu Bherunda	James Robert	
1984	Indina Bharatha		
1984	Makkaliralavva Mane Thumba		
1985	Bettada Hoovu	Doddajja	
1985	Dhruva Thare	Kalinga Raya	
1985	Aahuti		
1985	Shabash Vikram		
1986	Preethi	Constable Belliappa	
1986	Bhagyada Lakshmi Baramma	Tarle Tamayya	
1986	Bete		
1987	Ondu Muttina Kathe	Narasimha Swami	
1987	Thaliya Aane		
1987	Olavina Udugore	Raghanna	
1987	Shruthi Seridaaga	Subbu	
1987	Athiratha Maharatha		
1988	Devatha Manushya	Rangappa	
1988	Daada		
1988	Ranaranga	Shanthamurthy	
1989	Hrudaya Geethe		
1989	Rudra		
1989	Samsara Nouke		
1990	Ashwamedha	Rama	
1990	Udbhava	Ramachari	
1991	Kalyana Mantapa	Nanjundaiah	
1991	Neenu Nakkare Haalu Sakkare	Narsapura Nanjundaiah	
1992	Belliyappa Bangarappa	Rajasuite Uthappa	
1992	Halli Meshtru		
1992	Purushotthama		
1994	Love 94		
1994	Odahuttidavaru		
1995	Bombat Raja Bandal Rani		
1995	Yama Kinkara		
