= Kalyan Kumar =

Indian actor

- Born: Chokkanna; 7 June 1928; Melukote, Mysore State, British India
- Died: 1 August 1999 (aged 71); Karnataka, India
- Other names: Sampath Kumar, Chokkanna, Venkataranga
- Occupations: Actor, film director, producer
- Years active: 1954–1999
- Spouse: Revathi
- Children: 2

Kalyan Kumar (7 June 1928 – 1 August 1999) was an Indian actor, as well as an occasional film director and producer, who worked primarily in Kannada and Tamil cinema. Making his acting debut in the mythological drama Natashekara (1954), Kalyan Kumar went on to star in over 200 films in a span of over five decades. He was one of the most sought-after actors in the 1950s through 1970s for lead roles.

Kalyan Kumar has the credit of being the first ever Kannada actor to star in a colour film in Amarashilpi Jakanachari (1963). Alongside Kumar, the 1960s and 1970s in Kannada cinema was dominated by two other actors, Rajkumar and Udayakumar. At a time when actors had a tough time establishing themselves, Kalyan Kumar being successful not only in Kannada cinema, also made a mark in Tamil cinema. Kalyan Kumar along with Udaykumar, Rajkumar were called as "Kumara Thrayaru" (The Kumar Trio) of the Kannada cinema.

== Early life ==
Kalyan Kumar was born as Chokkanna in a Tamil speaking Iyengar family on 7 June 1928 in Melukote and raised Bangalore, in the erstwhile Princely State of Mysore of British India. His parents wanted him to be a doctor. But passion for acting brought him to Kannada film land. Born as Chokkanna into a middle-class family, Kalyan Kumar became known for his lavishness and sophistication.

Known for sophisticated portrayal of roles he played the hero against J. Jayalalithaa in Maavana Magalu in 1965 and Badukuva Daari in 1966. The triumvirate had acted in Bhoodaana which was a hit in 1962. He had also acted in first full-length colour film in Kannada Amarashilpi Jakanachari, in which he played the role of Jakanachari, a historical figure in sculpture.

== Career ==
Kumar set out to Bombay (now Mumbai) to pursue a career as an actor and approached several film producers to get his first break. Unsuccessful there, he left for Madras (now Chennai) in search for opportunities. He was first cast in the Kannada-language film Natashekhara which released in 1954. He was cast opposite Sandhya and Vidyavathy, the mother and aunt respectively of actress and politician J. Jayalalithaa. He was christened Kalyan Kumar after the name of his mother's character in the film, Kalyaniamma. The film's plot drew a parallel between Kumar's unsuccessful tryst with Hindi cinema and an actor's life who transforms himself to attain fame and glory after the release of his first film.

Kumar would go on to appear in several films depicting social conflict. Bhagya Chakra, Mutthaide Bhagya and Sadarame, all of which released in 1956 fell in this genre. In the latter film, Kumar played a thief. His Bettada Kalla (1957), a remake of the Tamil film Malaikkallan (1954), was a commercial success. Kumar then appeared in social-comedies such as Premada Putri (1957) and Rayara Sose (1957). In Bhookailasa (1958), he played Narada alongside Rajkumar's Ravana. In Manege Banda Mahalakshmi (1959), he appeared alongside his future wife Revathi. In the social-drama Bhoodana (1962), set on the backdrop of Bhoodan movement, he starred alongside Rajkumar and Udaykumar; Kumar played Lachcha, the son of Rajkumar's Dasanna, a Hindu who converts to Christianity in search of a better life. In Thayi Karulu that released the same year, Kumar played dual role of a father and son. While in the remainder of the 1960s, he appeared in films such as Subba Shastry (1966), in which he played a priest; Puttanna Kanagal's Belli Moda (1967), both of which were major commercial successes, he also tried his hand in film production. Endu Ninnavane (1966), Kallu Sakkare (1967) and Pravasi Mandira (1968) all turned out to be commercial failures. Which caused his film career to decline.

He would go on to appear in successful films such as Mavana Mgalu, Arishina Kunkuma, Bedi Bandavalu, Kathaa Sangama, and Kaleju Ranga. In G. V. Iyer's 1962 film, Bhoodaana, Kumar appeared alongside Rajkumar and Udayakumar, the only film that featured the trio together. He acted with all the prominent heroines of his time - B Saroja Devi, Sahukar Janaki, Kalpana, Jayanti, Bharati, Aarathi, and Roopadevi.

He acted in several films made in the 1960s by B. Vittalacharya as well as the Kannada version of bi-lingual films made by Nagendra Rao and B R Panthulu. He was a regular actor in the early G V Iyer films like Bhoodana, Tayi karalu, Lawyer magalu and Bangari.

He had very few films to his credit during 1970s namely College Ranga and Katha Sangama, Tulasi to name a few. He bounced back during early 1980s through Successful film Taayiya Nudi and played successful character roles in Simha Gharjane, Shubha Muhurtha, Lakshmi Katakasha, Marali Goodige.

He acted in many Tamil films. His Tamil film Nenjil Oru Alayam was later made in Hindi as Dil Ek Mandir with Rajendra Kumar. As he was gaining popularity in Tamil filmdom, he started acting in more of Tamil movies. But, the regional politics reigned over his acting talents.

He was married to Kannada film heroine Revathi. He also produced and directed stage plays like Ramu Nanna Thamma and Chikamma, many of which were written by his wife. His son Bharath Kalyan is a television actor who acted mainly in Tamil serials. Bharath Kalyan has recently rendered his voice for a character artist in Imaikkaa Nodigal (2018).

== Filmography ==
Please refine and expand this Filmography.

=== Kannada films ===
Year	Film	Role	Notes
1954	Natashekhara		First lead role
1956	Ohileshwara		
1956	Bhagya Chakra		
1956	Mutthaide Bhagya		
1956	Sadarame		
1957	Rayara Sose	Aravind	
1957	Bettada Kalla		
1957	Premada Putri		
1958	Bhookailasa	Narada	
1959	Manege Banda Mahalakshmi		
1961	Vijayanagarada Veeraputhra		
1962	Gaali Gopura	Mohan	
1962	Daiva Leele		
1962	Thayi Karulu		
1962	Bhoodana	Lachha	
1962	Devasundari	Veera Pratapa	
1963	Amarashilpi Jakanachari	Jakanachari	
1963	Lawyer Magalu		
1963	Bangari		
1964	Chinnada Gombe	Raja	
1964	Mane Aliya	Somashekhar	
1964	Annapoorna	Mohan Ram	Cameo
1965	Mavana Magalu		
1965	Balarajana Kathe		
1965	Beratha Jeeva	Dr. Rajashekhar	
1965	Nanna Kartavya	Sundar	
1966	Subba Sastry		
1966	Endu Ninnavane		
1966	Badukuva Daari		
1966	Love in Bangalore		
1967	Muddu Meena		
1967	Belli Moda	Mohan Rao	
1967	Premakkoo Permitte	Diwakar	
1967	Kallu Sakkare		
1968	Bedi Bandavalu		
1968	Arunodhaya		
1968	Anna Thamma		
1968	Manku Dinne	Gopi	
1968	Mysore Tonga		
1968	Pravasi Mandira		
1968	Anandakanda		
1968	Attegondukala Sosegondukala		
1968	Mamathe		
1968	Naane Bhagyavati		
1968	Savira Mettilu		Released in 2006 with Ramakrishna completing his role
1969	Kannu Muchale		
1969	Mukunda Chandra		
1969	Odahuttidavaru	Anand	
1969	Niraparadhi		
1970	Aparajithe		
1970	Arishina Kumkuma	Raja "Raju" N. K.	
1971	Papa Punya		
1971	Sedina Kidi		
1971	Amara Bharathi		
1976	Katha Sangama	Sadanand	
1976	Tulasi		
1976	College Ranga	Professor Devayya	
1977	Banashankari		
1977	Mugdha Manava		
1977	Udugore		
1977	Subhashaya		
1978	Anuraha Bandhana		
1979	Maralu Sarapani		
1980	Mother		
1980	Mane Madadi Makkalu		Not Released
1980	Chithrakoota		Not Released
1983	Nagabekamma Nagabeku		
1983	Simha Gharjane	S.P. Chandrashekhar	
1983	Chinnadantha Maga	Ramachandra Rao	
1983	Thayiya Nudi		
1984	Avala Antharanga		
1984	Police Papanna		
1984	Guru Bhakti		
1984	Shubha Muhurta		
1984	Marali Goodige		
1985	Kiladi Aliya		
1985	Lakshmi Kataksha	Jayanna	
1985	Thayi Thande		
1986	Thavaru Mane		
1986	Usha		
1986	Africadalli Sheela	Rao Bahaddur	
1987	Thaliya Aane		
1988	Oorigitta Kolli		
1989	Thaligagi		
1990	Bannada Gejje	Peter	
1992	Mana Gedda Maga		Late Release
1995	Sangeetha Sagara Ganayogi Panchakshara Gavai		Cameo
1995	Kavya	Rajaram	
1996	Hetthavaru	Shivappa	
1999	Sambhrama	Bhaskar	
2006	Savira Mettilu	Shekhar	Posthumous release; delayed release

=== Tamil films ===
Year	Film	Role	Notes
1960	Kadavulin Kuzhandhai		
1961	Thayilla Pillai	Somu	
1962	Nenjil Or Aalayam	Dr. Murali	
1962	Paasam	Raghu	
1962	Azhagu Nila		
1962	Seeman Petra Selvangal		
1962	Thendral Veesum		
1963	Neengadha Ninaivu		
1963	Kadavulai Kanden		
1963	Mani Osai		
1963	Nenjam Marappathillai	Chinna Zamindar Raja / Anand	
1963	Yarukku Sontham		
1965	Thayin Karunai		
1974	Avalukku Nihar Avale		
1985	Pudhu Yugam	Bhaskar	
1988	Sakkarai Pandhal		
1992	Rasukutty	Periyapannai	
1993	Amaravathi	Balasubramaniam	
1993	Gokulam	Kannan's father	
1994	Jaihind	Chief Minister	
1994	Maindhan	Ramasamy Mudaliar	

=== Other language films ===
Year	Film	Role	Language	Notes
1986	Sri Vemana Charitra		Telugu	
1993	Prema Samaram		Telugu	
1996	Shri Krishnarjuna Vijayam		Telugu	
1994	The City	R. S. Pandiyan	Malayalam	

=== Television ===
Year	Film	Role	Language	Notes
1998–1999	Akshaya	Veeraraghavan	Tamil	
