= T. G. Lingappa =

Indian music director

- Born: Thiruchirappalli Govindarajulu Lingappa; 22 August 1927; Tiruchirappalli, Madras Presidency, British India
- Died: 5 February 2000 (aged 72)
- Occupation: Music director
- Spouse: Shantamma
- Parents: G. Govindarajulu; Gowri

Thiruchirappalli Govindarajulu Lingappa (22 August 1927 – 5 February 2000) was an Indian music director who worked predominantly in Kannada language films. He also worked in Tamil and Telugu movies. He was the son of G. Govindarajulu Naidu who was also a musician.

== Early life ==
T.G. Lingappa was the second son and had learned music from his father G. Govindarajulu. His family stayed in Thiruchi Telugu and kannada speaking Balija Or Gavara naidu family. This is where M. K. Thyagaraja Bhagavathar (MKT) used to sing in their house and G. Govindarajulu introduced MKT to his children. G. Govindarajulu was a harmonium player in special dramas, but was also known as the one who taught music for K. B. Sundarambal. He also sold musical instruments and gramophone in Thiruchi, but the business was not doing very well. T. G. Lingappa had learned to play several musical instruments. In 1940, G. Govindarajulu took his family to Madras to look for greener pasture there.

== Career life ==
At the age of 14, Lingappa tried to act in the film Kamathenu which was produced by Visvanathan. Instead Visvanathan had asked Lingappa to sing and to remain with him for sometime to given chance. He stayed a few months and when it is not fruitful and then moved on. Since he is able to play musical instruments, he then joined the Mayoora Film Orchestra and played harmonium, mandoline and guitar. This orchestra used to play music for films and gramophone. Lingappa played instruments for Ashok Kumar (1941) and he was earning a salary of ₹30 monthly .

In the same year Lingappa approached Gemini Studios to try his luck. C. Ramchandra was working there with other older artists. But Lingappa was rejected due to his young age. Not giving up, Lingappa proceeded to Salem to try his chance in Modern Theatres when music director T. A. Kalyanam invited him. There Lingappa met T. R. Pappa and K. V. Mahadevan. It was the time during the 1940s where everyone was circumambulating all available studios for opportunities.

In 1945, Lingappa returned to Madras and worked under R. Sudarsanam in Pragathy Studios and he played instruments in the film Sri Valli (1945). Lingappa went to Karakkudi to play musical instruments when AVM Productions made Nam Iruvar (1947). In 1948, he returned to Madras and worked under C. R. Subburaman. All this experience under different renowned music directors had sparked an idea to be a freelance musician. He went on to purchase modern instruments from abroad, especially London, where he bought the electric guitar. Lingappa was well capable of playing the guitar. Music directors G. Ramanathan, S. V. Venkatraman and K. V. Mahadevan had used Lingappa for several of their songs. From then on Lingappa was playing many instruments under all the leading music directors.

He worked with singers like T. M. Soundararajan, A. M. Rajah, Seerkazhi Govindarajan, V. N. Sundaram, S. C. Krishnan, M. L. Vasanthakumari, P. Leela, Jikki, T. V. Rathnam, A. P. Komala, Radha Jayalakshmi, Soolamangalam Rajalakshmi, K. Jamuna Rani, P. Susheela, K. Rani and S. Janaki.

The singing actors M. M. Dandapani Desikar, T. R. Mahalingam, K. R. Ramasamy, U. R. Jeevarathinam, N. S. Krishnan, T. A. Madhuram and J. P. Chandrababu also sang memorable songs under his compositions.

=== T. G. Lingappa and T. R. Mahalingam ===
T. R. Mahalingam had produced his first film Macha Regai (1950) where the music was done by C. R. Subburaman. His manager was B. R. Panthulu. Since C. R. Subburaman died suddenly, T. R. Mahalingam who had known Lingappa from earlier and became closer in the film Nam Iruvar, gave Lingappa chance to compose music for his second production Mohana Sundaram (1951). There are more than ten songs in Mohanasundaram. It was also that J. P. Chandrababu sang first Hello My dear Darling, Hello My rose charming. The success of the songs are due to T. R. Mahalingam and Lingappa both knew carnatic music, cooperated and discussed the tunes together. After that T. R. Mahalingam used Lingappa in his other movies like Chinna Durai and Vilayattu Bommai.

=== T. G. Lingappa and B. R. Panthulu ===
B. R. Panthulu separated from T. R. Mahalingam and started Padmini Pictures for which banner Lingappa composed most number of films in Tamil. The first film of B. R. Panthulu was Kalyanam Panniyum Brahmachari (1954), a Sivaji Ganesan starrer directed by P. Neelakantan. There are excellent songs in this film. The Bharathidasan song Vennilaavum Vaanum Pol was first sung by M. M. Dandapani Desikar in the stages. Lingappa obtained his permission to use the same song in Kalyanam Panniyum Brahmachaari with some modifications and after the approval of the tune by Baradidasan, Radha Jayalakshmi sang the song. V. N. Sundaram sang the comedy song Kaviyin Kanavil Vaazhum Oviyame in which he combines light music with carnatic tune. J. P. Chandrababu sang for Sivaji Jolly Life Jolly Life. This film and songs became a hit. B. R. Panthulu again booked Lingappa for Sivaji Ganesan starrer Mudhal Thethi (1955).

Thangamalai Ragasiyam (1958) is another film that lifted P. Suseela to great heights. The song is Amuthai Pozhiyum Nilave. The same film was taken in Hindi and this song was retained with Hindi words. Again it became a success in the Hindi circles.

Lingappa continued on composing for Sabaash Meena (1958), Engal Kudumbam Perisu (1958) and Kuzhandhaigal Kanda Kudiyarasu (1960). He then went on to compose in Kannada movies. After a break he came back to compose in Muradan Muthu (1964). That was the last film where B. R. Pantulu used Sivaji Ganesan.

However, Lingappa continued on working with Panthulu in many more Kannada films till the early 1970s. There were Malayalam films too.

The last collaboration was Kadavul Mama (1974) before the demise of Panthulu.

== Works ==
Vaazhviley Oru Naal (1956) produced by T. S. Venkataswami who is the husband of U. R. Jeevarathinam. In this movie by Lingappa there is a duet Thendrale Varaayo Inba Sugam Tharayo by T. M. Soundararajan and U. R. Jeevarathinam.

It is said by Lingappa himself that there are at least two songs that he composed, but came to be used by other music directors. One is Kunguma Poove which J. P. Chandrababu learnt under Lingappa and sang for S. M. Subbaiah Naidu in Maragatham (1959). The other is the song Putham Puthu Meni by Balamurali Krishna and P. Susheela in Subathinam.

Some compositions of T. G. Lingappa:

- Oh.. Jegamathil Inbam Thaan Varuvathu Ethanaale from Mohanasundaram by T. R. Mahalingam and S. Varalakshmi
- Paattu Venumaa from Mohanasundaram by T. R. Mahalingam
- Amuthai Pozhiyum Nilavey from Thangamalai Ragasiyam by P. Susheela
- Thendrale Varaayo Inba Sugam Tharayo from Vaazhviley Oru Naal by T. M. Soundararajan and U. R. Jeevarathinam
- Onnuley Irunthu 20 Varaikkum Kondattam from Mudhal Thethi by N. S. Krishnan
- Thunbam Varumbothu Nagaithiduvaai from Mudhal Thethi by M. M. Dandapani Desikar
- Vennilaavum Vaanum Pol from Kalyanam Panniyum Brahmachaari by Radha Jayalakshmi
- Kaviyin Kanavil Vaazhum Oviyame from Kalyanam Panniyum Brahmachaari by V. N. Sundaram
- Athimadhura Anuraga from Engal Kudumbam Perisu by A. M. Rajah and K. Jamuna Rani
- Radha Madhava Vinodha Radha from Engal Kudumbam Perisu by T. M. Soundararajan and P. Susheela
- Chithitram Pesuthadi from Shabash Meena by Soolamangalam Rajalakshmi
- En Arumai Kathalikku Vennilave from Ellorum Innattu Mannar by T. M. Soundararajan
- Asaiyil Oonjalil Adiduvom from Kuzhandaigal Kanda Kudiyarasu by Jikki and A. P. Komala
- Kadhal Ullam Kavarntha Neeye from Sangilithevan by T. M. Soundararajan and P. Leela

== Filmography ==
=== Music director ===
Year	Film	Language	Director	Banner	Note
1951	Mohana Sundaram	Tamil	A. T. Krishnaswamy	Sukumar Productions	
1952	Chinna Durai	Tamil	T. R. Mahalingam	Sukumar Productions	
1954	Kalyanam Panniyum Brammachari	Tamil	P. Neelakantan	Padmini Pictures	
1954	Vilayattu Bommai	Tamil	T. R. Raghunath	Sukumar Productions	
1955	Menaka	Tamil	V. C. Subburaman	Kasturi Films	with C. N. Pandurangan & Vedha
1955	Modala Thedi	Kannada	P. Neelakantan	Padmini Pictures	
1955	Mudhal Thethi	Tamil	P. Neelakantan	Padmini Pictures	
1955	Shivasharane Nambekka	Kannada	P. Neelakantan	Padmini Pictures	
1956	Sivasakthi	Tamil	P. Neelakantan	Padmini Pictures	
1956	Vazhvile Oru Naal	Tamil	A. Kasilingam	Mercury Pictures	with S. M. Subbaiah Naidu & C. N. Pandurangan
1957	Premada Putri	Kannada	R. Nagendra Rao	R. N. R. Pictures	with H. R. Padmanabha Shastry
1957	Rathnagiri Rahasya	Kannada	B. R. Panthulu	Padmini Pictures	
1957	Rathnagiri Rahasyam	Telugu	B. R. Panthulu	Padmini Pictures	with M. S. Raju
1957	Thangamalai Ragasiyam	Tamil	B. R. Panthulu	Padmini Pictures	
1958	Thedi Vandha Selvam	Tamil	P. Neelakantan	Arasu Pictures	
1958	Thirumanam	Tamil	A. Bhimsingh	Valampuri Pictures	with S. M. Subbaiah Naidu
1958	Kanniyin Sabatham	Tamil	T. R. Raghunath	Jupiter Pictures & ALS Production	
1958	Sabaash Meena	Tamil	B. R. Panthulu	Padmini Pictures	
1958	Badi Panthulu	Telugu	B. R. Panthulu	Padmini Pictures	
1958	Engal Kudumbam Perisu	Tamil	B. R. Panthulu	Padmini Pictures	
1958	School Master	Kannada	B. R. Panthulu	Padmini Pictures	
1959	Pudhumai Penn	Tamil	M. Thiruvengadam	Sri Gajalakshmi Pictures	
1958	Sebash Pilla	Telugu	B. R. Panthulu	Padmini Pictures	
1959	Veera Amar Singh	Tamil			with Shanmuga Babu
1960	Ellorum Innaattu Mannar	Tamil	T. Prakash Rao	Jupiter Pictures	
1960	Kuzhandhaigal Kanda Kudiyarasu	Tamil	B. R. Panthulu	Padmini Pictures	
1960	Makkala Rajya	Kannada	B. R. Panthulu	Padmini Pictures	
1960	Pillalu Techina Challani Rajyam	Telugu	B. R. Panthulu	Padmini Pictures	
1960	Sangilithevan	Tamil	B. R. Panthulu	Padmini Pictures	
1961	Chinnanna Sapadam	Telugu	T. Prakash Rao	Jupiter Pictures	
1961	Ennai Paar	Tamil	G. R. Nathan	Palaniyappa Productions	
1961	Kittur Chennamma	Kannada	B. R. Panthulu	Padmini Pictures	
1961	Rani Chennamma	Telugu	B. R. Panthulu	Padmini Pictures	
1962	Gaali Gopura	Kannada	B. R. Panthulu	Padmini Pictures	
1962	Gaali Medalu	Telugu	B. R. Panthulu	Padmini Pictures	
1963	Pempudu Koothuru	Telugu	B. R. Panthulu	Padmini Pictures	
1963	Saaku Magalu	Kannada	B. R. Panthulu	Padmini Pictures	
1963	Sathi Shakthi	Kannada	Kanagaal Prabhakara Shastry	Matha Pictures	
1964	Chandavalliya Thota	Kannada	T. V. Singh	Pals & Co	
1964	Chinnada Gombe	Kannada	B. R. Panthulu	Padmini Pictures	
1964	Muradan Muthu	Tamil	B. R. Panthulu	Padmini Pictures	
1964	School Master	Malayalam	B. R. Panthulu	Padmini Pictures	
1965	Bettada Huli	Kannada	A. V. Sheshagiri Rao	Bhagavati Productions	
1965	Naga Pooja	Kannada	D. S. Rajgopal	Maruthi Films	
1966	Dudde Doddappa	Kannada	B. R. Panthulu	Padmini Pictures	
1966	Emme Thammanna	Kannada	B. R. Panthulu	Padmini Pictures	
1966	Thayin Mel Aanai	Tamil	G. R. Nathan	Nagendra Films	
1967	Beedi Basavanna	Kannada	B. R. Panthulu	Padmini Pictures	
1967	Chakra Theertha	Kannada	Peketi Sivaram	Sri Bhagavathi Productions	
1967	Gange Gowri	Kannada	B. R. Panthulu	Padmini Pictures	
1967	Veera Pratigna	Telugu	G. R. Nathan	Sri Tirumala Pictures	with Veluri
1968	Amma	Kannada	B. R. Panthulu	Padmini Pictures	
1968	Chinnari Puttanna	Kannada	B. R. Panthulu	Padmini Pictures	
1968	Dhoomakethu	Kannada	R. N. Jayagopal	Sri Bhagavathi Art Productions	
1968	Naane Bhagyavati	Kannada	T. V. Singh Thakur		
1969	Gandondu Hennaru	Kannada	B. R. Panthulu	Padmini Pictures	
1969	Thanga Malar	Tamil	D. S. Rajagopal	Ganga Productions	
1970	Sri Krishnadevaraya	Kannada	B. R. Panthulu	Padmini Pictures	Won, Karnataka State Film Award for Best Music Director
1971	Sri Krishnadevarayalu	Telugu	B. R. Panthulu	Padmini Pictures	
1971	Aliya Geleya	Kannada	B. R. Panthulu	Padmini Pictures	
1971	Hu Bisilu	Kannada	T. V. Singh		
1971	Kula Gourava	Kannada	Peketi Sivaram	Eshwari Productions	
1971	Malathi Madhava	Kannada	B. R. Panthulu	Padmini Pictures	
1972	Kula Gowravam	Telugu	Peketi Sivaram	Eshwari Productions	
1972	Ondu Hennina Kathe	Kannada	B. R. Panthulu	Padmini Pictures	
1974	Basti Pilla Bhale Donga	Telugu	Amancharla Seshagiri Rao	Krishna Movies Enterprises	
1974	Kadavul Mama	Tamil	B. R. Panthulu	Padmini Pictures	
1975	Devara Kannu	Kannada	Y. R. Swamy	Sri Bhagavathi Productions	
1975	Hosilu Mettida Hennu	Kannada	V. T. Thyagarajan		
1976	College Ranga	Kannada	Puttanna Kanagal	Padmini Pictures	
1977	Babruvahana	Kannada	Hunsur Krishnamurthy	Rajkamal Arts	
1977	Lakshmi Nivasa	Kannada	K. S. R. Das	Jayalakshmi Art Enterprises	
1977	Ondu Premada Kathe	Kannada	Joe Simon	R. S. R. Combines	
1977	Veera Sindhoora Lakshmana	Kannada	Hunsur Krishnamurthy	Sri Sangameshwara Productions	
1978	Kudure Mukha	Kannada	Y. R. Swamy		
1978	Thayige Thakka Maga	Kannada	V. Somashekar	Poornima Enterprises	
1979	Madhu Chandra	Kannada	Ramesh – Shivaram	T B R Productions	
1980	Bhaktha Siriyala	Kannada	Hunsur Krishnamurthy		
1980	Bhakta Shiriyala	Telugu	Hunsur Krishnamurthy		
1980	Jari Bidda Jana	Kannada	Y. R. Swamy	Thirupathi Jain Films	
1981	Bhagyavantha	Kannada	Dorai-Bhagwan	Nirupama Art Combines	
1982	Hasyaratna Ramakrishna	Kannada	B. S. Ranga	Varna Productions	
1983	Bhakta Prahlada	Kannada	Vijay	Nirupama Art Combines	
1983	Geluvu Nannade	Kannada	S. A. Chandrasekhar		
1985	Narasimha Avataram	Telugu			
1985	Shiva Kotta Sowbhagya	Kannada	Hunsur Krishnamurthy	Santhosh Combines	
1987	Shruthi Seridaaga	Kannada	B. Dattaraj	Nikhileshwari Cine Combines	
1988	Shiva Mecchida Kannappa	Kannada	Vijay	Bhagavathi Combines	

- Rajayogam
- Yediyooru Siddalingeshwara Mahime

=== Playback singer ===
Year	Film	Language	Song	Co-singer	Music
1952	Chinna Durai	Tamil	O Raagini Vaa Raagini	K. Rani	T. G. Lingappa
1958	Badi Pantulu	Telugu	Kshemasaagaraa Lokapaalanaa	A. P. Komala & K. Rani	T. G. Lingappa
1958	Engal Kudumbam Perisu	Tamil	Somasekara Loga Paalane	A. P. Komala & K. Rani	T. G. Lingappa
1958	School Master	Kannada	Swami Devane Loka Paalane	A. P. Komala & K. Rani	T. G. Lingappa
1958	School Master	Kannada	Raadhaa Maadhava Vinodha Haasa	P. Susheela	T. G. Lingappa
1958	School Master	Kannada	Sompaada Sanjevele	P. Susheela	T. G. Lingappa
1958	Sabaash Meena	Tamil	Erungammaa Summaa Erungammaa	J. P. Chandrababu & P. Susheela	T. G. Lingappa
1963	Saaku Magalu	Kannada	Naanu Andhalade	P. Susheela	T. G. Lingappa

== See also ==
- Vijaya Bhaskar
- M. Ranga Rao
- G. K. Venkatesh
- Rajan–Nagendra
- Upendra Kumar
