= Bangalore Latha =

Indian playback singer

Background information
- Born: Latha; 1941; Bangalore, Mysore state, (now Karnataka), India
- Died: 26 March 1990 (aged 48–49)
- Genres: Filmi; Folk; Classical; Bhajan
- Occupation: Singer
- Instrument: Vocals
- Years active: 1962–1990
- Label: Independent Artist

B. R. Latha, popularly known as Bangalore Latha, was an Indian singer who worked in south Indian film industry, mainly in Kannada and Telugu.

== Career ==
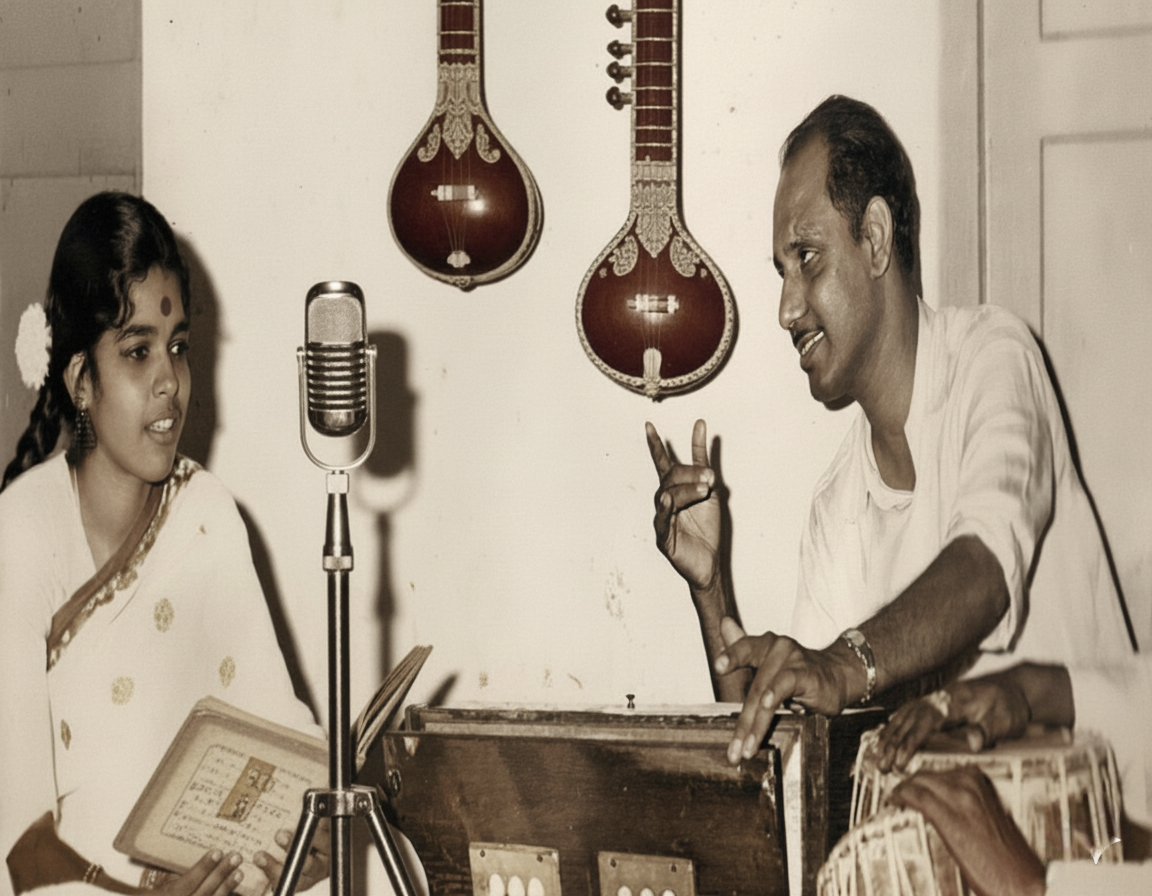
Vijaya Bhaskar is recording a song with Bangalore Latha

Latha was noticed by music composer G. K. Venkatesh at an event in Purabhavan, Bangalore and he introduced her to films through the movie Kantheredu Nodu in 1961. Next she recorded a song for the 1962 film Mahathma Kabir, starring Dr. Rajkumar and Krishna Kumari in lead role. She went on to record songs in Kannada, Telugu, Hindi, Tamil, Malayalam and Tulu.

Latha recorded her duets with P. B. Srinivas, Mohammad Rafi, Ghantasala, S. P. Balasubrahmanyam, M. Balamurali Krishna, Dr. Rajkumar, S. Janaki, Vani Jairam, P. Susheela, L. R. Eswari, B. K. Sumitra, B. R. Chaya and some rare duets with Musuri Krishnamurthy, Shankar Nag and Vishnuvardhan.

== Personal life ==
Latha was born and raised in Bangalore. She was trained in music by Chintanapalli Krishnamurthy. She married actor Tomato Somu. Latha committed suicide by taking sleeping pills on 26 March 1990.

== Notable songs ==

Kannada Songs:

- Amba jagadamba (Oorigitta Kolli)
- Odi baa ododi baa (Chakra Theertha)
- Vanamali Vaikunthapathe (Parvathi Kalyana)
- Nee modalu modalu nanna nodidaga (Choori Chikkanna)
- Cheluvaralli Cheluva (Gange Gowri)
- Chandramukhi Pranasakhi (Naandi)
- Neenarigadeyo Ele Manava (Chandavalliya Thota)
- Hrudaya pallavi (Hrudaya Pallavi)
- Eko Eno e nanna manavu (Jwaalamukhi)
- Heluvudu ondu maduvudu innondu (Jwalamukhi)
- Aa moda banalli (Druva Thaare)
- Nada charite nenapisuva (Thayiya Hone)
- Aa rathiye Dharegilidante (Dhruva Thaare)
- Anuragada ravi udayisalu (Idu Namma Desha)

Telugu Songs: Latha has rendered some of her best songs in Telugu. The most famous was Salalitha Raga Sudharasa Saaram with M. Balamuralikrishna, composed by Susarla Dakshinamurthi, from the 1963 classic Nartanasala.

- Amma annadi oka kammani maata (Bullemma Bullodu)
- Salalitha Raga Sudharasa Saaram (Narthanashala)
- Redu Messeeya (Yesu Paadamulandu) and more.

== Film songs ==
Selected songs of Latha, are listed here.

=== Film songs ===
Year	Film	Language	Song	Music	Co-singers
1962	Mahathma Kabir	Kannada	"Andada Sundara Kandane"	A. Anasuya Devi	S. Janaki
1963	Sri Ramanjaneya Yuddha	Kannada	"Jhana Jhana Jhanjana"	Satyam	S. Janaki
1963	Mana Mecchida Madadi	Kannada	"Yesu Nadigala Dati"	Vijaya Bhaskar	P. B. Srinivas, L. R. Eswari
1963	Nartanasala	Telugu	"Salalitha Raga"	S. Dakshinamurthi	M. Balamuralikrishna
1963	Nartanasala	Telugu	Sheelavati	S. Dakshinamurthi	solo
1964	Prathigne	Kannada	"Deepavaliyu Kuniyuta bantu"	S. Hanumantha Rao	
1964	Naandi	Kannada	"Chandramukhi Pranasakhi"	Vijaya Bhaskar	S. Janaki
1964	Thotalo Pilla Kotalo Rani	Telugu	"Konda Jathi Kondenagu"	S. P. Kondandapani	S. Janaki
1964	Pathiye Daiva	Kannada	"Kopaveke Ajji"	Vijayabhaskar	B. K. Sumitra
1965	Mahasathi Anasuya	Kannada	"Samanaariharu enna"	S. Hanumantha Rao	P. B. Srinivas, S. Janaki
1965	Chandrahasa	Kannada	"Yava Kaviya Shrungara Kalpaneyo"	S. Hanumantha Rao	Ghantasala
1965	Dorikithe Dongalu	Telugu	"Sri Venkatesa Eesa"	Saluri Rajeswara Rao	M. Balamurali Krishna, P. Susheela
1965	Bhoomiyile Malakha	Malayalam	"Akashathambalamuttathu"	Jaya Vijaya, M. A. Madeez, P. S. Divakar	S. Janaki, Zero Babu
1966	Mantralaya Mahatme	Kannada	"Shravana Keerthana"	Rajan–Nagendra	
1966	Mane Katti Nodu	Kannada	"Chamaraja pete"	R. Rathna	K. S. L. Swamy
1966	Madhu Malathi	Kannada	"Anjike Nachike Yethake"	G. K. Venkatesh	S. Janaki
1966	Madhu Malathi	Kannada	"Ee Bhava Ee Bhangi"	G. K. Venkatesh	S. Janaki
1966	Dudde Doddappa	Kannada	"Mathade Eko Nalla"	T. G. Lingappa	Solo
1966	Dudde Doddappa	Kannada	"Nodu Kannara Henna Vayyara"	T. G. Lingappa	Renuka
1966	Bala Nagamma	Kannada	"Kala Bandithu Ninage"	S. Rajeshwara Rao	L. R. Eshwari
1966	Mohini Bhasmasura	Telugu	"Anaga Anaga Oka Papa Kore"	Saluri Rajeshwararao	solo
1967	Parvathi Kalyana	Kannada	"Vanamali Vaikuntapathe"	G. K. Venkatesh	P. B. Srinivas
1967	Parvathi Kalyana	Kannada	"Maara Chittha Chora"	G. K. Venkatesh	L. R. Eswari
1967	Lagna Pathrike	Kannada	"Illi Yaru Illa"	Vijaya Bhaskar	P. B. Srinivas, L. R. Eswari
1967	Gange Gowri	Kannada	"Cheluvaralli Cheluva"	T. G. Lingappa	S. Janaki
1967	Gange Gowri	Kannada	"Tunga Bhadra Kaveri"	T. G. Lingappa	solo
1967	Gange Gowri	Kannada	"Minchina Holeyali Mindave"	T. G. Lingappa	S. Janaki
1967	Chakra Theertha	Kannada	"Odi Baa"	T. G. Lingappa	B. K. Sumitra
1967	Beedi Basavanna	Kannada	"Beda Beda Bagilu Hakabeda"	T. G. Lingappa	Nageshwara Rao
1968	Sarvamangala	Kannada	"Shri Parvatiya"	C. Satyam	solo
1968	Namma Ooru	Kannada	"Cheluvina Ganiyagi"	R. Rathna	P. B. Srinivas
1968	Namma Ooru	Kannada	"Sundara Lokake Swagathavu"	R. Rathna	P. B. Srinivas
1968	Lakshadheeshwara	Kannada	"Premakke Kannilla"	C. Satyam	P. B. Srinivas
1968	Chinnari Puttanna	Kannada	"Hoova Tandu Maridalu"	T. G. Lingappa	S. Janaki, Renuka
1968	Chinnari Puttanna	Kannada	"Madumagalu Neenamma"	T. G. Lingappa	S. Janaki, Renuka
1968	Amma	Kannada	"Entha Cheluva Naguvo"	T. G. Lingappa	P. B. Srinivas
1968	Govula Gopanna	Telugu	"Ee Virithotala"	Ghantasala	P. Susheela, Raghavulu, Ghantasala
1968	Govula Gopanna	Telugu	"Dum Dum Dry Cleaning"	Ghantasala	Ghantasala
1968	Devakanya	Telugu	"Kalalanni Pulakinchu Vela"	T. V. Raju	Ghantasala
1968	Rajayogam	Telugu	"Nacchinavadu"	Sathyam	S. Janaki
1968	Anna Tamma	Kannada	"Iniya Kogileya"	Vijaya Bhaskar	P. Susheela, Renuka
1969	Gandondu Hennaru	Kannada	"Muttabeda Maathadabeda"	T. G. Lingappa	Nageshwara Rao
1969	Choori Chikkanna	Kannada	"Nee Modalu Modalu"	C. Satyam	S. P. Balasubrahmanyam
1969	Mukunda Chandra	Kannada	"Halu Hoovu Jonna Jenu"	G. K. Venkatesh	P. B. Srinivas
1969	Kathanayakudu	Telugu	"Manchivadu Maa Babayi"	T. V. Raju	P. Susheela
1969	Satthekalapu Satthayya	Telugu	"Muddu Muddu Navvu"	M. S. Vishwanathan	P. B. Srinivas
1969	Pratheekaram	Telugu	"Sinthapuvvanti Sinnadhiro"	Chellapilla Satyam	T. R. Jayadev, SPB
1970	Mruthyupanjaradalli Goodhachari 555	Kannada	"Kamana Billindilidu"	C. Satyam	P. B. Srinivas
1970	Yamalokapu Gudhachari	Telugu	"Kaanee Kaanee Sare Dhachuko"	V. Siva Reddy	Jamuna Rani
1971	Aliya Geleya	Kannada	"Eri Banni Nodi"	T. G. Lingappa	P. Nageshwara Rao, T. G. Lingappa
1972	Malathi Madhava	Kannada	"Aha Naa Mareyalare"	T. G. Lingappa	S. P. Balasubrahmanyam
1972	Bullamma Bullodu	Telugu	"Amma Annadi Okka Kammani"	C. Satyam	Ramana, SPB
1972	Athanu Diddina Kodalu	Telugu	"Thandaana"	Master Venu	SPB
1975	Kaveri	Kannada	"Shilpa Chatura Kalpna"	M. Ranga Rao	N. S. Raman
1975	Aadadani Adrushtam	Telugu	"Tholireyilo Pulakinthalo"	S. Hanumantha Rao	V. Ramakrishna, P. Susheela
1976	Idu Namma Desha	Kannada	"Anuragada Ravi Udayisalu"	Rathnam	solo
1977	Manasinante Mangalya	Kannada	"Ivanenammi Duddalla"	Ramesh Naidu	solo
1978	Muyyige Muyyi	Kannada	"Belli Chukki Belli Chukki"	Satyam	SPB, P. Susheela, P. B. Srinivas
1978	Bhale Huduga	Kannada	"Baare Baare Henne"	G. K. Venkatesh	S. Janaki
1978	Prema Chesina Pelli	Telugu	"Thalle Daivam"	Chellapilla Satyam	S. P. Shailaja
1979	Atthege Thakka Sose	Kannada	"Dhaanya Lakumi Bandavale"	M. Ranga Rao	S. Janaki
1979	Kotha Kodalu	Telugu	"Needhi Vayyaram"	Chellapilla Satyam	SPB
1979	Lakshmi Pooja	Telugu	"Muripale Chupi Mohale Repi"	Chellapilla Satyam	P. Susheela
1980	Pattanakke Banda Pathniyaru	Kannada	"Shankara Gangadhara"	M. Ranga Rao	P. B. Srinivas, SPB, S. Janaki
1980	Guru Sarvabhouma Shri Raghavendra Karune	Kannada	"Oorella Belagako Deepavali"	M. Ranga Rao	P. Susheela
1981	Number Aidoo Ekka	Kannada	"Honganasu Nanasagide"	M. Ranga Rao	Musuri Krishnamurthy
1981	Naga Kala Bhairava	Kannada	"Nammee Baale"	M. Ranga Rao	K. J. Yesudas
1981	Avali Javali	Kannada	"Baare Mankaliye"	Satyam	Ramesh
1982	Suvarna Sethuve	Kannada	"Venku Chinku"	Vijaya Bhaskar	P. B. Srinivas
1982	Kempu Hori	Kannada	"Angalada Soojimallige"	M. Ranga Rao	S. P. Balasubrahmanyam
1982	Raga Thala	Kannada	"O Cheluve"	M. Ranga Rao	S. P. Balasubrahmanyam
1982	Karmika Kallanalla	Kannada	"Ninagagi Kadidde"	G. K. Venkatesh	SPB
1982	Kalasapurada Hudugaru	Kannada	"Shirabagi Namisiro"	M. Ranga Rao	P. B. Srinivas
1982	Guna Nodi Hennu Kodu	Kannada	"Yavvanada Hosadada"	M. Ranga Rao	SPB, S. Janaki
1982	Bhakta Gnanadeva	Kannada	"Dharmakshetre Kurukshetre"	G. K. Venkatesh	P. B. Srinivas
1982	Prathishte	Kannada	"Illa Illa Illa"	M. Rangarao	
1982	Prathishte	Kannada	"Idu Prayada Mayajalavo"	M. Rangarao	solo
1982	Prathishte	Kannada	"Madhyakke Neenu Hodeyeke"	M. Rangarao	solo
1983	Kalluveene Nudiyithu	Kannada	"Ee Sarigamada"	M. Ranga Rao	SPB
1983	Aadarsha	Kannada	"Kannada Nadina Simhada Marigale"	M. Ranga Rao	P. B. Srinivas, Chorus
1984	Rudranaga	Kannada	"Cheluvina Chenniga"	M. Ranga Rao	Vishnuvardhan
1984	Benki Birugali	Kannada	"Thayi Irada Thabbali Navu"	M. Ranga Rao	Sulochana
1984	Oh Maane Maane	Tamil	"Abhiramiye Annaiye"	Ilayaraja	P. Susheela
1985	Sneha Sambandha	Kannada	"Eko Eno"	G. K. Venkatesh	Ramesh
1985	Thayiya Hone	Kannada	"Sogasu Kanna Kunisiralu"	Satyam	SPB
1985	Thayiya Hone	Kannada	"Nada Charite Nenapisuva"	Satyam	P. Susheela, B. R. Chaya
1985	Maruthi Mahime	Kannada	"Elli Ramano Alli Hanumano"	Satyam	Solo
1985	Mareyada Manikya	Kannada	"Endu Ninu Hige Nagutha"	Shankar–Ganesh	Raj Seetharam, Manjula
1985	Lakshmi Kataksha	Kannada	"Bevu Bella Ondada Hage"	C. Satyam	Raj Seetharam, SPB
1985	Jwaalamukhi	Kannada	"Eko Eno Ee Nanna Manavu"	M. Ranga Rao	Dr. Rajkumar
1985	Jwaalamukhi	Kannada	"Heluvudu Ondu Maduvudu" Innondu	M. Ranga Rao	Dr. Rajkumar
1985	Dhruva Thare	Kannada	"Aa Moda Banalli"	Upendra Kumar	Dr. Rajkumar, Vani Jairam
1985	Dhruva Thare	Kannada	"Aa Rathiye Dharegilidante"	Upendra Kumar	Dr. Rajkumar
1985	Ade Kannu	Kannada	"Nayana Nayana Milana"	G. K. Venkatesh	Dr. Rajkumar
1985	Hosa Anubhava	Kannada	"Anubhava Hosa Anubhava"	M. Rangarao	
1986	Madhura Bandhavya	Kannada	"Aa Swargavello"	M. Ranga Rao	Raj Seetharam
1986	Madhura Bandhavya	Kannada	"Ullasa Santhosha"	M. Ranga Rao	Raj Seetharam
1986	Madhura Bandhavya	Kannada	"Baro Nanna Chinna"	M. Ranga Rao	solo
1986	Madhura Bandhavya	Kannada	"Nannata Nodalu Aathura"	M. Ranga Rao	solo
1986	Bettada Thaayi	Kannada	"Shravanaya"	Satyam	P. B. Srinivas
1987	Shiva Bhakta Markandeya	Kannada	"Shivane Bhayaharane"	M. Ranga Rao	Rajkumar Bharati
1987	Shiva Bhakta Markandeya	Kannada	"Amma Ekaluve"	M. Ranga Rao	solo
1988	Oorigitta Kolli	Kannada	"Amba Jagadamba"	M. Ranga Rao	solo
1990	Halliya Surasuraru	Kannada	"Ase Emba Aleya Mele"	M. Ranga Rao	C. Aswath
1989	Samsara Nouke	Kannada	"Adi Parashakti Jagadambe"	M. Ranga Rao	SPB, chorus

== Non-film songs ==
=== Devotional / Folk songs ===
Year	Album	Song	Music	Ref
1982	Ashtadevi Darshana	"Thaayi Banashankari"	Lakshminarayana Gochi	
1982	Ashtadevi Darshana	"Bhaktara More Keli"	Lakshminarayana Gochi	
1985	Gananayaka Gananayaka	"Hullina Harike"	M. Ranga Rao	
1985	Gananayaka Gananayaka	"Gananayaka Gananayaka"	M. Ranga Rao	
1985	Gananayaka Gananayaka	"Jo Jo Laali"	M. Ranga Rao	
1985	Gananayaka Gananayaka	"Ganapathiyenuva"	M. Ranga Rao	
1985	Gananayaka Gananayaka	"Bhagyada Bagula"	M. Ranga Rao	
1985	Gananayaka Gananayaka	"Aarathi"	M. Ranga Rao	
1985	Gananayaka Gananayaka	"Bandithu"	M. Ranga Rao	
1985	Gananayaka Gananayaka	"Nadesu Namma"	M. Ranga Rao	
1985	Gananayaka Gananayaka	"Malige Jaji"	M. Ranga Rao	
1985	Nanjunda Chamundi	"Ambe Jagadambe"	M. Ranga Rao	
1985	Nanjunda Chamundi	"Nanjunda Ninna Na"	M. Ranga Rao	
1985	Nanjunda Chamundi	"Nanjunda Chamundi"	M. Ranga Rao	
1985	Nanjunda Chamundi	"Moodana Kempaithu"	M. Ranga Rao	
1985	Nanjunda Chamundi	"Nanjundesha Ninna"	M. Ranga Rao	
1985	Nanjunda Chamundi	"Avva Nannavva"	M. Ranga Rao	
1989	Janapada Geethaganga	"Allena Keliri"	M. Ranga Rao	
1989	Janapada Geethaganga	"Haalu Maari"	M. Ranga Rao	
1989	Janapada Geethaganga	"Nellakki Haseya"	M. Ranga Rao	
1989	Janapada Geethaganga	"Hasiya Betthada Kolu"	M. Ranga Rao	
1989	Janapada Geethaganga	"Maralalladyane"	M. Ranga Rao	
1989	Janapada Geethaganga	"Deevalige Habba"	M. Ranga Rao	
1989	Janapada Geethaganga	"Male Male Maathadi"	M. Ranga Rao	
1989	Janapada Geethaganga	"Suvvakka Suvvalaali"	M. Ranga Rao	
1994	Sridevi Bhaktilahari	"Dhyaana Madu Manave" (with Puttur Narasimha Nayak)	B. V. Srinivas	
1994	Sridevi Bhaktilahari	"Ambe Jagadambe Thayi"	B. V. Srinivas	
2003	Shiva Sthuthi	"Sri Manjunathane"	Upendra Kumar	–
