= Gaali Medalu =

- Theatrical release poster
- Directed by: B. R. Panthulu
- Written by: D. V. Narasa Raju (dialogues)
- Screenplay by: Dadamiraasi
- Story by: M. S. Solamalai; Padmini Pictures Unit
- Produced by: B. R. Panthulu
- Starring: N. T. Rama Rao; Devika
- Cinematography: W. R. Subba Rao
- Edited by: R. Devarajan
- Music by: T. G. Lingappa
- Production company: Padmini Pictures
- Release date: 9 February 1962
- Running time: 153 mins
- Country: India
- Language: Telugu

Gaali Medalu (transl. Air Castles) is a 1962 Indian Telugu-language drama film, produced and directed by B. R. Panthulu. It stars N. T. Rama Rao, Devika with music composed by T. G. Lingappa. The film was simultaneously made in Kannada as Gaali Gopura by the same banner and director. Both versions were successful at the box office.

== Cast ==
- N. T. Rama Rao as Krishna, Ranganatham’s son
- Devika as Lakshmi
- S. V. Ranga Rao as Paanakaalu
- Jaggayya as Mohan
- Rajanala as Zamindar
- V. Nagayya as Ranganatham, Krishna’s father
- Ramana Reddy as Platform
- Jayanthi as Nirmala / Nimmy
- M. V. Rajamma as Santhamma
- Surabhi Balasaraswathi as Kanakam
- B. Rama Devi Venku (Rajanala's Wife)
- B. Viswanatham as Naganna

== Soundtrack ==
Music composed by T. G. Lingappa.

Song title	Lyrics	Singers	Length
"O Raayudo"	Adisesha Reddy	Madhavapeddi Satyam, S. Janaki	3:02
"Krishna Manchi"	Ramchand	Renuka	2:35
"Ee Mooga Choopaela"	Samudrala Sr.	Ghantasala, Renuka	3:21
"Navaraagalu"	Ramchand	P. B. Srinivas, P. Susheela	3:52
"Tea Shopuloni Pilla"	Kosaraju	Pithapuram, K. Rani	2:46
"Gaali Maeda Koolipoyera"	Adisesha Reddy	Raghavulu	3:52
"Mamathalu Leni"	Samudrala Sr.	Ghantasala	3:06
