= Thangamalai Ragasiyam =

1957 film by B. R. Panthulu

- Theatrical release poster
- Directed by: B. R. Panthulu
- Written by: P. Neelakantan (dialogues)
- Screenplay by: Chithra Krishnaswami
- Story by: Chinna Annamalai; Ve. Lakshmanan
- Produced by: B. R. Panthulu
- Starring: Sivaji Ganesan; T. R. Rajakumari; Jamuna
- Cinematography: G. K. Ramu (Black-and-white); W. R. Subbarao (Gevacolor)
- Edited by: R. Devarajan
- Music by: T. G. Lingappa
- Production company: Padmini Pictures
- Distributed by: Meena Movies
- Release date: 29 June 1957
- Running time: 191 minutes
- Country: India
- Language: Tamil

Thangamalai Ragasiyam (transl. Secret of the Golden mountain) is a 1957 Indian Tamil-language adventure film produced and directed by B. R. Panthulu. The film stars Sivaji Ganesan, T. R. Rajakumari and Jamuna. It was simultaneously made in Kannada as Rathnagiri Rahasya. The film was released on 29 June 1957 and emerged a success.

== Plot ==
Gajendran, a prince, is separated from his parents by his father's foe at a very young age. He grew up as a ferocious and vicious caveman. He meets Amutha, who by her word of love and affection turns Gajendran for good. Both set out to find the secret of Thangamalai to find and save Gajendran's parents.

== Cast ==
Cast according to the song book and the opening credits of the film:

Male cast

- Sivaji Ganesan as Gajendran
- M. N. Nambiar as Adithan
- P. S. Veerappa as Mahendran
- T. R. Ramachandran as Azhagesan
- K. Sarangapani as Sarangan
- C. V. V. Panthulu as Nandini's Father
- Kottapuli Jayaraman as Sundaran
- Ganapathi Bhat as Andaran
- M. S. Karuppaiah as Barber
- (Late) V. P. Balaram as Coach
- Velappa as Minister
- Kannan.S.A as Saint
- Thiruvenkatam as Commander
- Mani Bhagavathar Iyer as Mridanga Maestro
- Devadas as Thief

Female cast

- T. R. Rajakumari as Nandini
- Jamuna as Amutha
- M. V. Rajamma as Kumutha
- P. Dhanam as Sundari
- P. Susheela as Beautiful Mohini
- B. Saroja Devi as Young Mohini
- Angamuthu as Barber's Wife
- Shanthi as Friend
- (Baby) Seetha as Young Vikraman
- Indira Acharya as Kurathi

Supporting cast

- Chowdry
- Maheswara Iyer
- Ramasami Iyer
- Saroja
- Kamala

Uncredited role

- C. L. Anandan as a dancer in the song "Veeradhi Veeran Sooraadhi Sooran"

== Production ==
Thangamalai Ragasiyam was produced by B. R. Panthulu under Padmini Pictures. The original director was P. Neelakantan who left after directing a large portion of the film, resulting in Panthulu taking over direction. It was simultaneously made in Kannada as Rathnagiri Rahasya. The film was primarily shot in black-and-white, except for some sequences in Gevacolor. G. K. Ramu shot in black-and-white, and W. R. Subba Rao shot the colour sequences.

== Soundtrack ==
The music was composed by T. G. Lingappa. The song "Amudhai Pozhiyum Nilave", set in Pahadi, took at least 20 takes to perfect. It was later used in the Malayalam film Mariakutty (1958) as "Karalil Kaniyum Rasamey".

Song	Singers	Lyrics	Length
"Arul Purivaayo Jagannaadhaa"	Soolamangalam Rajalakshmi	Ku. Ma. Balasubramaniam	02:30
"Aanandham Pudhu Aanandham"	Jikki, K. Rani & Soolamangalam Rajalakshmi	Ku. Ma. Balasubramaniam	02:15
"Iga Logame Inidhaagume"	T. M. Soundararajan & P. Leela	Ku. Ma. Balasubramaniam	04:38
"Amudhai Pozhiyum Nilave"	P. Susheela	Ku. Ma. Balasubramaniam	03:14
"Ariyaadha Pillai Pole Aaatthira Padalaamaa"	V. N. Sundaram & Jikki	Ku. Ma. Balasubramaniam	02:31
"Yauvvaname En Yauvvaname"	A. P. Komala & K. Rani	Ku. Ma. Balasubramaniam	02:90
"Kalyanam Nam Kalyanam"	T. M. Soundararajan & P. Leela	Ku. Ma. Balasubramaniam	03:41
"Amudhai Pozhiyum Nilave" (pathos)	P. Susheela	Ku. Ma. Balasubramaniam	02:17
"Kaattu Raajaa Aiyaa Kaattu Raajaa"	A. G. Rathnamala & K. Rani	Ku. Ma. Balasubramaniam	02:24
"Ennai Paaraai En Kannai Paaraai"	Jikki	Ku. Ma. Balasubramaniam	03:15
"Varavenum Varavenum"	A. P. Komala, A. G. Rathnamala & K. Rani	Ku. Ma. Balasubramaniam	02:12
"Veeradhi Veeran Sooraadhi Sooran"	S. C. Krishnan & K. Rani	Ku. Ma. Balasubramaniam	02:06
"Thaaraniyil Unnai Ennai"	T. M. Soundararajan	Ku. Ma. Balasubramaniam	01:06
"Vaa Vaa Vaa Odi Vaa"	P. Leela & K. Rani	Ku. Sa. Krishnamurthy	03:12
"Iru Kaadhum Poddhaadhaiyaa"	Soolamangalam Rajalakshmi	Ku. Sa. Krishnamurthy	03:22

== Release and reception ==
Thangamalai Ragasiyam was released on 29 June 1957, and distributed by Meena Movies in Madras. The film was a commercial success.
