= Sangilithevan =

- Directed by: B. R. Panthulu
- Written by: Sakthi Krishnaswamy
- Produced by: A. L. Srinivasan
- Starring: S. S. Rajendran; Rajasulochana; T. S. Balaiah
- Cinematography: M. Karnan
- Edited by: R. Devan
- Music by: T. G. Lingappa
- Production company: A. L. S. Productions
- Release date: 27 May 1960
- Running time: 177 mins.
- Country: India
- Language: Tamil

Sangilithevan is a 1960 Indian Tamil language film produced by A. L. Srinivasan and directed by B. R. Panthulu. The film stars S. S. Rajendran and Rajasulochana.

== Cast ==
The following list was adapted from the database of Film News Anandan

Male cast

- S. S. Rajendran
- T. S. Balaiah
- V. K. Ramasamy
- T. K. Ramachandran
- S. A. Natarajan

Female cast

- Rajasulochana
- P. S. Gnanam
- Pushpavalli
- Suryakala

== Production ==
The film was produced by A. L. Srinivasan under his own banner A. L. S. Productions, and was directed by B. R. Panthulu. Sakthi Krishnaswamy wrote the story and dialogues. Cinematography was handled by M. Karnan while the editing was done by R. Devan. P. B. Chowthi and Vaduvugar were in charge of art direction. Choreography was done by Chinni, Sampath and M. S. Muthukrishnan. Still photography was by Thiruchi K. Arunachalam. The film was processed at Vijaya lab.

== Soundtrack ==
The music was composed by T. G. Lingappa.

Song	Singer/s	Lyricist	Duration (m:ss)
"Padippu Thevai, Athodu"	T. M. Soundararajan with group	Pattukkottai Kalyanasundaram	
"Sattaiyile Theychukalaam"	Thiruchi Loganathan, P. Leela	Pattukkottai Kalyanasundaram	
"Kaadhal Ullam Kavarndha"		Ku. Ma. Balasubramaniam	
"Thillai Nagar Thanile"		K. S. Gopalakrishnan	
"Thendral Urangida Koodumadi"		Kannadasan	
"Sarasa Kalaiyil Ival Rani"	P. Susheela		
"Kaalai Varuvatharkul"	K. Jamuna Rani		
"Kuyilisaiyum Kuzhalisaiyum"	K. Jamuna Rani, A. M. Rajah	K. D. Santhanam	
