= Rathnagiri Rahasya =

Ratnagiri Rahasya
- Theatrical release poster
- Directed by: B. R. Panthulu
- Screenplay by: Chithra Krishnaswamy
- Story by: Chinnannamalai; Lakshmanan
- Dialogue by: Kanagal Prabhakara Shastry
- Produced by: B. R. Panthulu
- Starring: Udaykumar; Jamuna; Sowcar Janaki; B. Saroja Devi
- Cinematography: G. K. Ramu
- Edited by: R. Devarajan
- Music by: T. G. Lingappa
- Production company: Padmini Pictures
- Release date: 26 February 1957
- Running time: 172 minutes
- Country: India
- Language: Kannada

Rathnagiri Rahasya ( transl. The secret of Rathnagiri) is a 1957 Indian Kannada-language adventure film, directed and produced by B. R. Panthulu, starring Udaykumar and Jamuna. it was simultaneously made in Tamil as Thangamalai Ragasiyam, which was also released in 1957, with Jamuna reprising her role. Most of the technical crew worked on both the Tamil and Kannada versions of the film.

== Plot ==
Udaykumar portrays a prince who is separated from his parents at a young age by his father's enemy. Raised in isolation, he grows up as a ferocious and untamed caveman. His life changes when he meets Jamunam whose love and affection gradually transform him. Together, they embark on a journey to uncover the secret of Rathnagiri and to find and rescue the prince's parents.

== Cast ==
- Udaykumar
- Jamuna
- Sowcar Janaki
- B. Saroja Devi as Yavvanamohini
- B. R. Panthulu
- M. V. Rajamma
- Balakrishna
- T. R. Ramachandran
- Dikki Madhava Rao
- C. H. Narayana Rao
- H. Krishna Shastry

== Production ==
Rathnagiri Rahasya marks the directorial debut of B. R. Panthulu. It was simultaneously filmed in Tamil under the title Thangamalai Ragasiyam. Puttanna Kanagal, a future acclaimed director, made his debut as an assistant director for this film.

== Soundtrack ==
The soundtrack was composed by T. G. Lingappa.

1. "Sharanara Kaayo" – Soolamangalam Rajalakshmi
2. "Ananda Mahadaananda" – Jikki, Soolamangalam Rajalakshmi, K. Rani
3. "Anuragadha Amaravathi" – T. M. Soundararajan, P. Leela
4. "Amara Madhura Prema" – P. Susheela
5. "O Raja O Maharaja" – A. P. Komala, K. Rani
6. "Yavvanave Ee Yavvanave" – A. P. Komala, K. Rani
7. "Kalyana Namma" – T. M. Soundararajan, P. Leela
8. "Baa Baa Baa Odi Baa" – P. Leela, K. Rani
9. "Sumabaana Bidu Mouna" – Jikki
10. "Thaiy Thanthai Deva" – T. M. Soundararajan
11. "Kivi Eradu Sakenayya" – Soolamangalam Rajalakshmi
