= Chinnada Gombe =

1964 film

- Directed by: B. R. Panthulu
- Produced by: B. R. Panthulu
- Starring: B. R. Panthulu; Kalyan Kumar; Kalpana; Jayalalitha
- Cinematography: V. Ramamurthy
- Edited by: R. Devarajan
- Music by: T. G. Lingappa
- Production company: Padmini Pictures
- Release date: 4 November 1964
- Country: India
- Language: Kannada

Chinnada Gombe ( transl. Gold doll) is a 1964 Indian Kannada-language film, directed and produced by B. R. Panthulu. The film stars Panthulu, Kalyan Kumar, Kalpana, M. V. Rajamma and Jayalalitha. The film has musical score by T. G. Lingappa. The film was simultaneously shot in Tamil as Muradan Muthu, and remade into Hindi as Gopi and in Telugu as Palleturi Chinnodu. This was Jayalalitha's debut in a lead role, having previously acted as a child artiste.

== Cast ==
- Kalyan Kumar as Raja
- Kalpana
- J. Jayalalithaa as Rani
- B. R. Panthulu
- M. V. Rajamma
- Rajashankar
- Sandhya as Rani's mother
- B. Jaya
- Baby Vishalakshi
- Narasimharaju
- Balakrishna
- K. S. Ashwath

== Production ==
Panthulu met Jayalalithaa at an event celebrating his film Karnan's success, and Jayalalithaa's mother allowed her to be cast in Chinnada Gombe due to financial constraints.

== Soundtrack ==
The music was composed by T. G. Lingappa.

No.	Song	Singers	Lyrics	Length (m:ss)
1	"Goodinali Ondu Banadi"	R. Panigrahi	R. N. Jayagopal	04:03
2	"Honnase Ullavage"	P. B. Sreenivas	R. N. Jayagopal	03:08
3	"Mannalli Kaleya"	S. Janaki	Vijaya Narasimha	02:53
4	"Nodalli Meravanige"	P. Susheela	R. N. Jayagopal	03:19
5	"Sevanthige Chendinantha"	Soolamangalam Rajalakshmi	Vijaya Narasimha	02:58
6	"Thavare Hookere"	P. B. Sreenivas, P. Susheela	Vijaya Narasimha	03:50
