= Ellarum Innattu Mannar =

- Poster
- Directed by: T. Prakash Rao
- Written by: M. Karunanidhi
- Produced by: M. Somasundaram
- Starring: Gemini Ganesan; B. Saroja Devi
- Cinematography: A. Vincent
- Edited by: G. D. Joshi
- Music by: T. G. Lingappa
- Production company: Jupiter Pictures
- Release date: 1 July 1960
- Country: India
- Language: Tamil

Ellarum Innattu Mannar (transl. All are rulers of this nation) is a 1960 Indian Tamil language film directed by T. Prakash Rao. The film stars Gemini Ganesan and B. Saroja Devi, with M. N. Nambiar, M. N. Rajam and K. A. Thangavelu in supporting roles.

== Plot ==
Valiyan Kodu is a kingdom ruled by Suhadevar. His daughter is Kanchana. The king is a sickly person. Divan Alavandhar, who has two sons, administers the State. Veeramani is his biological son and Thirumeni is his adopted son. Divan plans for Veeramani to marry Kanchana and become the ruler of Valiyan Kodu. Valluvan Kundram is a village adjacent but outside the Kingdom. People of Valluvan Kundram consider Thangadurai as their chief. He is a patriotic person working for the welfare of the village. He has a younger brother named Thambidurai. They both had a sister named Angayarkanni. Thangadurai's wife is Idhyarani. The Head of the family is Chelliah, an uncle of Thangadurai. A conflict begins between Valiyan Kodu and Valluvan Kundram when a statue of Tiruvalluvar is found when the people of Valluvan Kundram build a dam. The divan of Valiyan Kodu claims the statue. Thambidurai keeps the statue in a well-guarded cave in Valluvan Kundram. Thirumeni comes to Valluvan Kundram for spying. He falls in love with Angayarkanni. Thambidurai meets Kanchana when she her father, the King spends a holiday in a forest resort. Thambidurai and Kanchana fall in love with each other. In the meantime, it becomes known that Tirumeni is the lost son of Chelliah. The divan gets angry. He sends the King and Kanchana to jail and declares war on Valluvan Kundram. How the Divan is exposed and the couples are united forms the rest of the story.

== Cast ==
- Gemini Ganesan as Thambidurai
- B. Saroja Devi as Princess Kanchana
- M. N. Nambiar as Thirumeni
- M. N. Rajam
- T. K. Bagavathi
- R. Nagendra Rao
- K. A. Thangavelu
- T. K. Ramachandran
- A. Karunanidhi
- M. R. Santhanam
- P. S. Venkitachalam
- S. G. Eswaran
- M. Krishnamurthi
- Lakshmiprabha
- P. Susheela

== Soundtrack ==
Music was composed by T. G. Lingappa.

Song	Singer/s	Lyricist	Duration(m:ss)
"Ellaarum Innaattu Mannaradaa"	T. M. Soundararajan, A. L. Raghavan & L. R. Eswari	S. Rathinam	03:00
"Vetri Petra Maamanukku"	P. Susheela & K. Rani	Ku. Ma. Balasubramaniam	03:18
"Vishayam Onnu Sollaporen"	K. Jamuna Rani & L. R. Eswari	Pattukkottai Kalyanasundaram	02:51
"Miruga Inam Thaan Uyarndhadhu"	Thiruchi Loganathan, A. L. Raghavan & P. Susheela	R. Pazhanichami	04:04
"Ennarumai Kadhalikku Vennilaave"	T. M. Soundararajan	Pattukottai Kalyanasundaram	03:18
"Manamennum Vaanile Mazhaimegam Aaagave"	A. M. Rajah & P. Susheela	R. Pazhanichami	03:17
"Pinju Manathil Piriyam Valarthu"	C. S. Jayaraman	Pattukottai Kalyanasundaram	03:26
