= Kittur Chennamma (film) =

- Title card
- Directed by: B. R. Panthulu
- Screenplay by: G. V. Iyer
- Produced by: B. R. Panthulu
- Starring: B. Saroja Devi; M. V. Rajamma; Dr. Rajkumar
- Cinematography: W. R. Subba Rao; M. Karnan
- Edited by: R. Devarajan
- Music by: T. G. Lingappa
- Production company: Padmini Pictures
- Release date: 24 February 1961
- Running time: 164 minutes
- Country: India
- Language: Kannada

Kitturu Chennamma is a 1961 Indian Kannada-language historical drama film directed and produced by B. R. Panthulu. It stars B. Saroja Devi as Kittur Chennamma, an Indian freedom fighter who led an armed rebellion against the British East India Company in 1824, and died in captivity in 1829. Dr. Rajkumar played the role of Raja Mallasarja whereas Raja Shankar played the role of his son.

Panthulu adapted the play Kittooru Chennamma by Anakru for the plotline of the movie based on the recommendation of his assistant Puttanna Kanagal. At the 9th National Film Awards, the film was awarded the Best Feature Film in Kannada. This film screened at IFFI 1992 B R Panthalu Homage section.

== Cast ==
- Dr. Rajkumar as Raja Mallasarja
- B. Saroja Devi as Kittur Chennamma
- M. V. Rajamma as Rudrambe
- Leelavathi as Veeravva
- Chindodi Leela as Kalavathi
- Ramadevi as Mahantavva
- Dikki Madhava Rao
- Narasimharaju
- Balakrishna as Harana Setty
- B. Hanumanthachar
- Eshwarappa
- K. S. Ashwath
- Rajashankar
- Veerappa Chinchodi

== Soundtrack ==
The music for the film was composed by T. G. Lingappa and lyrics for the soundtrack written by G. V. Iyer. The songs "Kolu Thudiya Kodagananthe" and "Thanukaragadavaralli Pushpava" were taken from the poems of Akka Mahadevi, a poet who lived in the 12th century Karnataka.

Title	Singer(s)
"Hoovina Hantha Hatthuva Jane"	S. Janaki, Kamala
"Nayanadali Doreyiralu Yara Kanali"	P. Susheela
"Aalakke Hoovilla"	S. Janaki, A. P. Komala
"Kolu Thudiya Kodagananthe"	S. Janaki
"Thanukaragadavaralli Pushpava"	P. Susheela
"Kitthura Raniyu Hetthalu Puthrana"	
"Devaru Devaru Devarembuvaru"	
"Sanne Eneno Maadithu Kannu"	P. B. Sreenivas, S. Janaki
"Ahorathri Niladodi"	P. B. Sreenivas
"Thayi Deviyanu Kaane"	P. Kalinga Rao
