= Chinnari Puttanna =

- Directed by: B. R. Panthulu
- Written by: B. V. Karanth
- Screenplay by: Padmini Pictures
- Produced by: B. R. Panthulu
- Starring: B. R. Panthulu; Ramesh; Narasimharaju; Ranga
- Cinematography: A. Shanmugam
- Edited by: R. Devarajan
- Music by: T. G. Lingappa
- Production company: Padmini Pictures
- Release date: 25 March 1968
- Country: India
- Language: Kannada

Chinnari Puttanna is a 1968 Indian Kannada-language film, directed and produced by B. R. Panthulu. The film stars B. R. Panthulu, Ramesh, Narasimharaju and Ranga. The film has musical score by T. G. Lingappa.

== Cast ==
- B. R. Panthulu
- Ramesh as Ravi
- Narasimharaju
- Ranga as Mukunda Rao
- Dinesh
- Chi Vishwanath
- B. Vijayalakshmi
- Udaya Chandrika
- Jr. Revathi
- Lalitha
- H. R. Shastry
- Nagappa
- Hanumantha Rao
- Comedian Guggu
- Anantharam Maccheri
- Narayan
- M. P. Shankar
- Shyam
- Mallesh
- Rama Rao
- Ranganath
- Master Ravi
- Master Basavaraj
- Papamma
- Shanthamma
- Suguna
- Jayanthi
- Baby Sunanda
- Baby Prema

== Soundtrack ==
The music was composed by T. G. Lingappa.

No.	Song	Singers	Lyrics	Length (m:ss)
1	"Jaya Jaya Jagadeesha"	S. P. Balasubrahmanyam	G. V. Iyer	03:27
2	"Roopayi Thanodi Banth"	P. B. Sreenivas, S. Janaki	G. V. Iyer	03:32
3	"Hoovathandu Maridalu"	S. Janaki, Bangalore Latha, Renuka	G. V. Iyer	03:30
4	"Madhumagalu Neenamma"	S. Janaki, Bangalore Latha, Renuka	G. V. Iyer	03:30
5	"Nanalli Neenaga Beku"	Bangalore Latha, P. B. Sreenivas	R. N. Jayagopal	03:28
