= Saaku Magalu =

- Directed by: B. R. Panthulu
- Written by: G. V. Iyer (dialogues)
- Story by: Eera Shanmugham
- Produced by: B. R. Panthulu
- Starring: Rajkumar; Sowcar Janaki; Kalpana; Dikki Madhava Rao; Narasimharaju; Balakrishna
- Music by: T. G. Lingappa
- Production company: Padmini Pictures
- Release date: 21 February 1963
- Running time: 157 minutes
- Country: India
- Language: Kannada

Saaku Magalu ( transl. Foster Daughter) is a 1963 Kannada language romantic drama film directed and produced by B. R. Panthulu and starring Rajkumar and Sowcar Janaki. The film marked the entry of acclaimed actress Kalpana, who went on to become one of the most sought-after actresses in Kannada cinema.

Director Panthulu selected Kalpana based on the recommendation of co-artist Narasimharaju and his assistant Puttanna Kanagal. Panthulu made the movie simultaneously in Telugu as Pempudu Koothuru starring NTR, Devika and Sowcar Janaki.

== Cast ==
- Dr. Rajkumar as Raghuram
- Sowcar Janaki as Manjula
- Rajashankar as Vasu, Manjula's brother
- Kalpana as Uma, Raghuram's foster sister
- Narasimharaju
- Dikki Madhava Rao as Raghuram and Uma's father
- T. N. Balakrishna as Dashavatharam
- B. Ramadevi as Dashavatharam's wife
- M. N. Lakshmi Devi
- H. Krishna Shastry
- Papamma as Raghuram and Uma's mother
- Shivaji Rao
- Comedian Guggu

== Crew ==
- Producer: B. R. Panthulu
- Production Company: Padmini Pictures
- Director: B. R. Panthulu
- Music: T. G. Lingappa
- Lyrics: Kanagal Prabhakara Shastry
- Story: Eera Shanmugham
- Screenplay: Chithra Krishnasamy
- Dialogues: G. V. Iyer
- Art Direction: Selvaraj
- Editing: R. Devarajan
- Choreography: P. S. Gopala Krishna
- Cinematography: V. Ramamurthy

== Soundtrack ==
The music director of the movie T. G. Lingappa himself rendered the hummings for 2 songs - Naanu Andhalaade and Jeevanaraga - the former of which had its picturization on the lead who acts to be a dumb person.

1. "Kelida Maathe" - Ghantasala
2. "Onde Ondu Hosa Haadu" - S. Janaki, P. B. Sreenivas
3. "Jeevana Raga" - Ghantasala, S. Janaki
4. "Naanu Andhalade" - P. Susheela
5. "Baa Bega Manamohana" - P. Leela
6. "Elli Hombelakelli" - Ghantasala
7. "Naanu Andhalade" - P. Susheela, T. G. Lingappa
