= Radha Ramana (film) =

- Directed by: Jyotish Sinha
- Written by: G. V. Iyer
- Produced by: M. V. Rajamma
- Starring: B. R. Panthulu; M. V. Rajamma; G. V. Iyer; Balakrishna
- Music by: H. R. Padmanabha Sastry
- Production companies: H. R. J. C and Sri Pictures
- Release date: 1943
- Running time: 185 minutes
- Country: India
- Language: Kannada

Radha Ramana is a 1943 Indian Kannada language drama film directed by Jyotish Sinha. Produced by actress M. V. Rajamma, the film was notably the first in Kannada cinema to have a woman producer. The film featured B. R. Panthulu and Rajamma playing the lead roles along with actors Balakrishna and G. V. Iyer making their respective acting debuts in the film. Both these actors went on to become one of the finest character artists in Kannada cinema.

Notably when director Jyotish Sinha left the film, M. V. Rajamma stepped in as director and finished the film.

== Cast ==
- B. R. Panthulu
- M. V. Rajamma
- Balakrishna
- G. V. Iyer
- Srinivasa Rao

== External sources ==
- Radha Ramana at IMDb
- Mangalakara Sadana on YouTube - a song sung by M. V. Rajamma from this film
