= Timmarusu =

Vijayanagaran prime minister and military commander (1461–1534)

Saluva Timmarasa
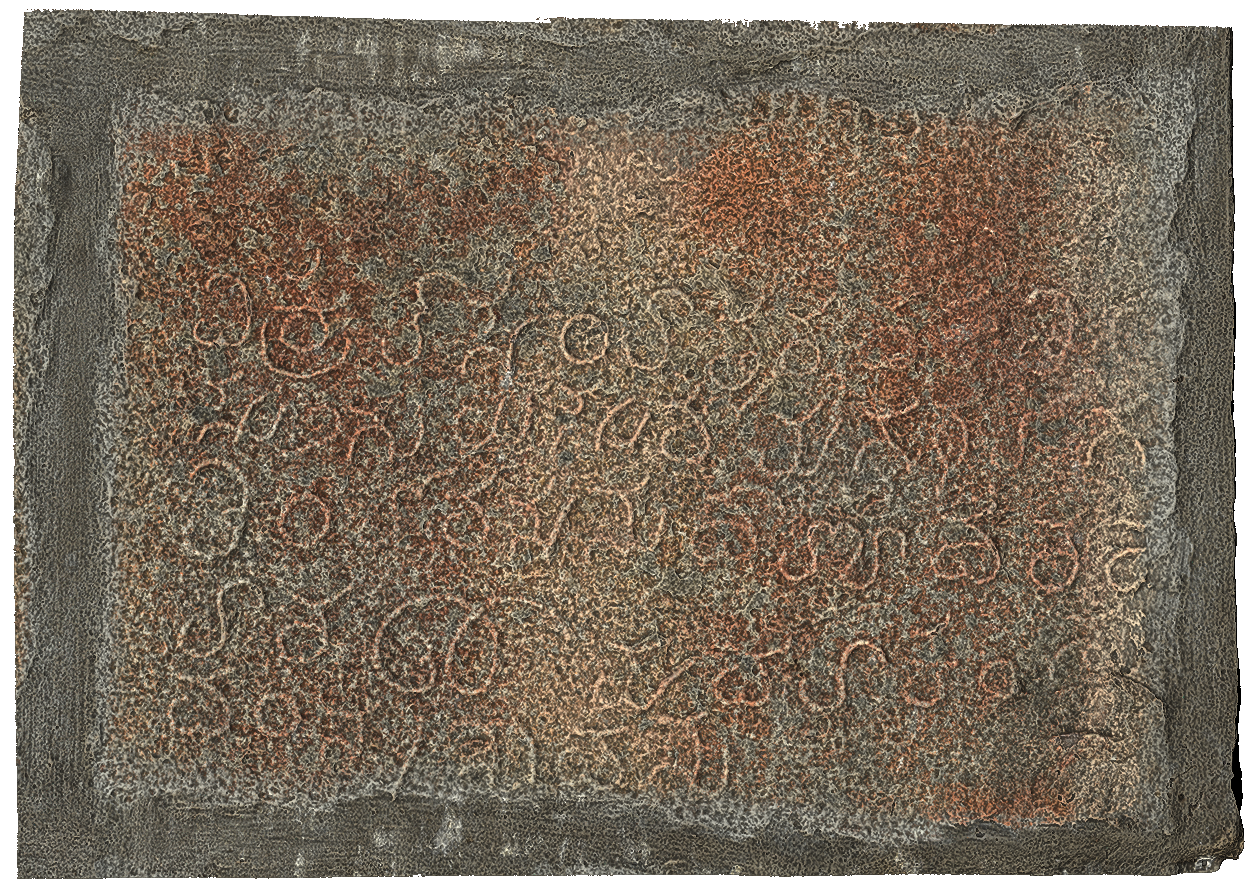
- Image of Timmarasa's Damodara Temple

Prime Minister of Vijayanagara Empire

"Mahamantri Timmarasa"

Personal details
- Born: 31 December 1461 Machilipatnam, Vijayanagara Empire
- Died: 1534 (aged 72–73) Penukonda, Vijayanagara Empire

Military service
- Battles/wars: Krishnadevaraya's Bahmani expedition Vijayangara–Gajapati War

Saluva Timmarusu (also known as Saluva Nayaka or Timmarasu or Timmarasa or Tiramisu); 31 December 1461 – 1534) was the prime minister (mahapradhana) and military commander of Krishnadevaraya. He is also known as "Appaji". He had also served as the prime minister under Viranarasimha Raya and Tuluva Narasa Nayaka.

== Name ==
Inscriptions mention him as Saluva Timma, Timma Rajah, Timayya and Timmarasa. Portuguese traveller Domingo Paes calls Timmarasa as "Temersea" who was Saluva Timma, Krishna Deva’s minister. The termination -rsea probably represents Arasa, the Kannada form for Rajah. Temersea = Timmarasa = Timma Rajah.

== Early life ==
Burton Stein in The New Cambridge History of India states Timmarusu as belonging to a Telugu-speaking Niyogi Brahmin family. Another source mentions him as belonging to Kannada-speaking family. He was born on 31 December 1461 in Machilipatnam.

== Early career ==
Timmarusu was responsible for the coronation of Krishnadevaraya. Records of Portuguese traveller Fernao Nuniz suggest that Vira Narasimha, while on his death bed, ordered Timmarasu to blind his half brother Krishnadevaraya to ensure that his own minor son of eight years would become king of the empire. Timmarasu instead presented the king with a pair of she-goat eyes in order to satisfy the wish of the dying king. This way Timmarasu ensured that Krishnadevaraya became the successor. However, K. A. N. Sastri believes that there is nothing to suggest anything but a friendly relationship between the two half-brothers. Timmarasu had very close relations with Tenali Ramakrishna and was a supporter of him.

== Military career ==
=== Campaign against Gajapatis ===
Saluva Timmarasu captured the forts of Addanki, Vinukonda, Bellamkonda, Nagarjunakonda, Tangeda and Ketavaram on his way to Kondavidu for Krishnadevaraya.

=== Battle of Raichur ===
When Krishnadevaraya engaged in his campaign against Orissa, Ismail Adil Khan, sultan of Bijapur captured Raichur. Krishnadevaraya led the expedition against him with a huge army, where Saluva Timmarasu assisted him as deputy commander-in-chief in this campaign. The Muslim camp was sacked and a large booty fell into the hands of Krishnadevaraya. Raichur was recaptured.

=== War With Golkonda ===
Saluva Timmarasu was appointed as the Governor of Kondavidu by Krishnadevaraya, Qutb Shahi forces entered the region but Timmarasu took command of the army and defeated Quli Qutb, captured Madar-ul-Mulk, the commander of the Qutb Shahi army with many of his officers, and sent them all as prisoners to Vijayanagara. Saluva also made necessary arrangements to deal with future threats.

== Later years ==
In 1524, Krishnadevaraya crowned his minor son Yuvaraja. A few months later the prince took ill and died of poisoning. Accusing Timmarasu for this crime, Krishnadevaraya had the minister and his son imprisoned and blinded. It is said the king later released Timmarasu, unknowing that the conspiracy to kill his own son was hatched by Gajapatis of Odisha.

The Gajapatis did not want their princess Jaganmohini to wed Krishnadevaraya, as they believed he was not pure. Krishanadevaraya's parents, Narasa Nayaka, a chieftain from Dakshina Kannada, and Nagaladevi, a chieftain's daughter from Andhra, were not from the royal family of Vijayanagara (Sangama dynasty). The Gajapatis belonged to Suryavansha (Solar dynasty) clan of Odisha. But they had to agree to this marriage, owing to Krishnadevaraya's victory over them.

The king deplored and repented with Timmarasu, later on. On being released, Timmarasu spent the rest of his life in Tirupati. He refused to take any support from his former king. He died in poverty. His Samadhi is in Penukonda in Anantapur district of Andhra Pradesh.

== Legacy ==
- Mahamantri Timmarusu is a 1962 Telugu-language historical drama directed by Kamalakara Kameswara Rao. Gummadi played the key role of Prime Minister Timmarusu. The film won a silver medal at the National Film Awards in 1962.
- In 1970 B. R. Panthulu directed and produced the Kannada film Sri Krishnadevaraya. Panthulu also enacted the role of Timmarusu and won the 1969-70 Karnataka State Film Award for Best Actor.
- He was portrayed by Aanjjan Srivastav in Doordarshan TV series Bharat Ek Khoj.
- He was portrayed by Jiten Mukhi in first season of Tenali Rama. In the second season, Amit Pachori got the role of Timmarusu.

== Bibliography ==
- K. A. Nilakanta Sastry, History of South India, From Prehistoric times to fall of Vijayanagar, 1955, New Delhi: Oxford U.P. (Reprinted 2002)
- Dr. Suryanath U. Kamat, Concise history of Karnataka, 2001, Bangalore: MCC (Reprinted 2002)
