= Mudhal Thethi =

- Poster in Tamil
- Directed by: P. Neelakantan
- Screenplay by: P. Neelakantan
- Story by: Dada Mirasi
- Produced by: B. R. Panthulu
- Starring: Sivaji Ganesan; Anjali Devi; N. S. Krishnan; T. A. Madhuram
- Cinematography: V. Ramamoorthy
- Edited by: R. Devarajan
- Music by: T. G. Lingappa
- Production company: Padmini Pictures
- Distributed by: Madras Pictures
- Release date: 12 March 1955
- Running time: 165 minutes
- Country: India
- Languages: Tamil; Kannada

Mudhal Thethi in Tamil, Modala Thedi in Kannada is an Indian bilingual film, directed by P. Neelakantan and produced by B. R. Panthulu. This was the first film produced by Panthulu under Padmini Pictures banner. The Tamil version starred Sivaji Ganesan, Anjali Devi, N. S. Krishnan and T. A. Madhuram in lead roles. The film had musical score by T. G. Lingappa scoring for his first feature film. The film was a remake of the Hindi film Paheli Tarikh (1954).

The film was simultaneously shot in Kannada retaining the same crew members with a slight change in the main star cast. The Kannada version titled Modala Thedi starred Panthulu, M. V. Rajamma, Dikki Madhava Rao and Chi. Sadashivaiah. The movie follows the narrative theme of the 1946 film It's a Wonderful Life.

== Plot ==
Sivagnanam works as a bank clerk. Though his pay is meagre, he deals with a lot of cash at the bank. His family consists of his wife Lakshmi, a daughter whose marriage is being negotiated and two school going children. The bank where he works crashes and Sivagnanam is unable to find another job.

Dejected, he tries to kill himself so that his insurance money would be made available to the family. His soul reaches the court of Yama, the god of death. Angered by what he deals an irresponsible act, Yama sends him back to earth to see the result of his death. He is able to observe the goings on but is unable to participate. He watches his son being picked up by the police for stealing food, his daughter is molested and his wife drowns herself in a well after murdering the rapist. He realizes his mistake. Thankfully the whole series of events has been a dream.

== Cast ==
Tamil version

- Sivaji Ganesan as Sivagnanam
- Anjali Devi as Lakshmi
- N. S. Krishnan as Sathanandam
- T. A. Madhuram as Saanthamma
- K. D. Santhanam
- Srirangam Rangamani
- P. Susheela
- Rajagopal
- 'Baby' Uma as Sushila

Kannada version

- B. R. Panthulu
- M. V. Rajamma
- Dikki Madhava Rao
- Chi. Sadashivaiah
- Master Hirannaiah
- Sivaji Ganesan (guest appearance)

== Production ==
Muthal Thethi was produced by B. R. Panthulu, as the maiden venture of his production company Padmini Pictures. The film is based on a story by Dada Mirasi and the screenplay and dialogue are by P. Neelakantan, who directed the Tamil version. The film was based on a Hindi film, Paheli Tarikh. The music was composed by T. G. Lingappa and the lyrics were penned by K. D. Santhanam and Udumalai Narayana Kavi. V. Ramamurthi was the cinematographer, with audiography by V. S. Raghavan. Art direction was by the veteran A. K. Sekhar, and make-up and costumes were by Hari Babu and M. G. Naidu respectively. The film was edited by Devarajan. The film was shot at Revathi Studios, and was backed by the veteran A. L. Srinivasan, under his banner, Madras Pictures.

== Soundtrack ==
The music was composed by T. G. Lingappa.

Tamil Track listing

Song	Singers	Lyrics	Length
"Onnilayirundhu Irupadhu Varaikkum"	N. S. Krishnan	Udumalai Narayana Kavi	02:52
"Engum Inbame Pongum"	A. P. Komala & K. Rani	K. D. Santhanam	
"Aham Kulira... Mudhal Thethi" (Title song)	T. V. Rathnam	K. D. Santhanam	02:02
"Ellorum Kelunga Ullasa Payanam"	A. P. Komala	K. D. Santhanam	03:18
"Yaen Padaithaai Iraivaa"	M. M. Dandapani Desikar	K. D. Santhanam	
"Thunbam Varumpodhu Nagaithiduvai"	M. M. Dandapani Desikar	K. D. Santhanam	02:45
"Chinna Chinna Bommai Venum"	T. V. Rathnam & K. Rani		01:58

Kannada Track listing

Song	Singers	Lyrics	Length (m:ss)
"Modal Thedi Indu"	T. V. Rathnam	Chi Sadashivaiah	03:24
"Ondarinda Ippattara Varegu"	Dikki Madhava Rao	Chi Sadashivaiah	03:00
