= Samsara Nauka =

Samsara Nauke
- Directed by: H. L. N. Simha
- Produced by: T. N. K. Nanjappa Chettiar
- Starring: B. R. Panthulu; M. V. Rajamma; Dikki Madhava Rao
- Music by: M. Madhava Rao
- Production company: Devi Films
- Release date: 1936
- Running time: 185 minutes
- Country: India
- Language: Kannada

Samsara Nauke is a 1936 Indian Kannada language social drama film directed by H. L. N. Simha and produced by K. Nanjappa. This film was the fourth sound film produced in Kannada cinema and the first melodrama film based on social issues. The film met with huge success at the box-office upon release and was subsequently released in Tamil in 1948 with the same star cast. The investment was Rs.33000 and became a commercial success as it earned Rs. 2.5 lakhs.

The film cast consisted of B. R. Panthulu and M. V. Rajamma, both making their on-screen debuts, in the lead roles. Both these stars went on to become one of the most popular personalities in South Indian cinema. Along with them, Dikki Madhava Rao and S. K. Padmadevi were seen in the character roles.

== Plot ==
The film's plot is based on a social theme of the life of Sundar. Much against the wish of his grandfather (Dikki Madhava Rao), he marries his beloved Sarala. This act makes him to move away from his house and settle in his in-laws place. Few days later, his in-laws begin to treat him badly and eventually he loses his job as well. His misery deepens when he is held responsible for the murder of Sushila, a girl whom his grandfather wanted him to marry. How Sundar comes out of all the traumatic conditions forms the rest of the story.

== Cast ==
- B. R. Panthulu as Sundar
- M. V. Rajamma as Sarala
- Dikki Madhava Rao as Kanyakumari Dikshit "Dikki"
- B. V. Krishnamurthy
- S. K. Padmavathi
- M. S. Madhava Rao
- Sorat Ashwath
- Hunsur Krishnamurthy
- Sarojamma
- H. L. N. Simha
- H. R. Hanumantha Rao

== External sources ==
- Samsara Nauka at IMDb
