= Gange Gowri =

- Directed by: B. R. Panthulu
- Written by: A. S. Nagaraj
- Screenplay by: Padmini Pictures
- Produced by: B. R. Panthulu
- Starring: Rajkumar; Bharathi; Leelavathi; K. S. Ashwath
- Cinematography: P. L. Nagappa
- Edited by: R. Devarajan
- Music by: T. G. Lingappa
- Production company: Padmini Pictures
- Release date: 13 April 1967
- Country: India
- Language: Kannada

Gange Gowri is a 1967 Indian Kannada-language film, directed and produced by B. R. Panthulu. The film stars Rajkumar, Bharathi, Leelavathi and K. S. Ashwath. The film has musical score by T. G. Lingappa. The movie was remade in Tamil by B. R. Panthulu himself in 1973 as Ganga Gowri.

== Cast ==
- Rajkumar as Lord Shiva (Shivappa"Margabantu"/Astrologer Samayabantu)
- Bharathi as Gange
- Leelavathi as Dakshayani, Parvathi(Gowri)
- K. S. Ashwath as Narada
- Narasimharaju as Subrahmanya(Subbanna)
- M. P. Shankar as Shanishvara
- Krishna Shastry
- Hanumantha Rao
- Rajesh as Vishnu
- Dinesh
- Lakshmayya
- Narayan
- Anantharam Maccheri
- D. S. Thanthri
- Papamma
- B. Jaya as Kumuda (Gowri’s friend)
- Rama
- Premalatha

== Plot ==
The film encompasses the story of Daksha yajna. It depicts how the daksha yajna was desecrated following the jumping into the fire by Lord Shiva's wife Dakshayani. Following this, Lord Shiva marries Goddess Parvati. Later, the Devatas Shiva, Ganga, Gowri all take birth as avatars on earth in the city of Kashi. Eventually, Shiva, Gowri and Ganga all get married in their earthly avatars.

== Soundtrack ==
The music was composed by T. G. Lingappa.

No.	Song	Singers	Lyrics	Length (m:ss)
1	"Jaya Jaya Jagadeesha"	M. Balamuralikrishna	G. V. Iyer	03:49
2	"Bhavathi Bhikshandehi"	P. B. Sreenivas	G. V. Iyer	03:09
3	"Cheluvaralli Cheluva"	S. Janaki, Bangalore Latha	G. V. Iyer	02:58
4	"Thunga Badra Kaveri Ganga"	Bangalore Latha	G. V. Iyer	02:58
5	"Neerahotha Neere Jaane"	P. B. Sreenivas, P.leela	G. V. Iyer	03:46
6	"Minchina Holeyalli Mindave"	Bangalore Latha, S. Janaki	G. V. Iyer	
