= Beedi Basavanna =

- Directed by: B. R. Panthulu
- Written by: Rajashree
- Screenplay by: Padmini Pictures Sahithya Vibhaga
- Produced by: B. R. Panthulu
- Starring: Rajkumar; Bharathi; B. Vijayalakshmi; Narasimharaju
- Cinematography: P. L. Nagappa
- Edited by: R. Devarajan
- Music by: T. G. Lingappa
- Production company: Padmini Pictures
- Distributed by: Padmini Pictures
- Release date: 1967
- Running time: 134 minutes
- Country: India
- Language: Kannada

Beedi Basavanna is a 1967 Indian Kannada language film, directed and produced by B. R. Panthulu. The film stars Rajkumar, Bharathi, Vandana (B. Vijayalakshmi) and Narasimharaju. It features a musical score by T. G. Lingappa. Panthulu remade the movie in Tamil in 1970 as Thedi Vandha Mappillai with minor changes.

== Cast ==
- Rajkumar
- Bharathi
- B. Vijayalakshmi
- Narasimharaju
- Dinesh
- Hanumantha Rao
- Krishna Shastry
- Basappa
- Guggu
- Shivaji
- L. N. Swamy
- Narayan
- Keshavamurthy
- Shyam
- Rama Rao
- Puttaswamy
- Nagappa
- Bangalore Nagesh
- B. R. Panthulu
- Papamma
- B. Jaya
- Shanthamma
- Hema

== Soundtrack ==
The music was composed by T. G. Lingappa with lyrics written by G. V. Iyer.

No.	Song	Singers	Length (m:ss)
1	"Love Love Love Andre Prema"	P. B. Sreenivas	03:07
2	"Angaile Aagasa Thoro"	Madhavapeddi Sathyam, S. Janaki	03:20
3	"Bhale Chanside"	Madhavapeddi Sathyam	03:09
4	"Beda Beda Baagilu Haakabeda"	Nageswara Rao, Bangalore Latha	02:33
5	"Daadig Eppattu Ninage Ippattu"		03:11
6	"Ekanthavvagi Maathade Bande Naanu"	P. B. Shrinivas, S. Janaki	03:11
