= Muradan Muthu =

1964 film by B. R. Panthulu

- Theatrical release poster
- Directed by: B. R. Panthulu
- Screenplay by: M. S. Solaimalai
- Based on: Mane Naa Mana (1944)
- Produced by: B. R. Panthulu
- Starring: Sivaji Ganesan; Devika
- Cinematography: V. Ramamurthi
- Edited by: R. Devarajan
- Music by: T. G. Lingappa
- Production company: Padmini Pictures
- Release date: 3 November 1964
- Country: India
- Language: Tamil

Muradan Muthu (transl. Rogue Muthu) is a 1964 Indian Tamil-language film, directed and produced by B. R. Panthulu. A remake of the 1944 Bengali film Mane Naa Mana, the film stars Sivaji Ganesan, Devika, M. V. Rajamma and Chandrakantha. It was released on 3 November 1964. The film was simultaneously shot in Kannada as Chinnada Gombe, with a different cast. This was the last collaboration between Panthulu and Ganesan.

== Cast ==
- Sivaji Ganesan as Kalimuthu / Muthu
- Devika as Seetha
- B. R. Panthulu as Maruthamuthu
- M. V. Rajamma as Maruthamuthu's wife
- Chandrakantha as Muthu's sister
- Prem Nazir as Chinna Zamindar
- S. A. Ashokan as Periya Zamindar
- V. K. Ramasamy as Chettiyar
- Nagesh
- A. Karunanidhi
- C. K. Saraswathi as Seetha's stepmother
- O. A. K. Thevar

== Production ==
The film was simultaneously shot in Kannada as Chinnada Gombe. This was the last collaboration between Panthulu and Ganesan. Puppetry in the film was performed by M. M. Roy.

== Soundtrack ==
Music was composed by T. G. Lingappa, while the lyrics were penned by Kannadasan.

Song	Singer/s	Length
"Kalyana Ooravalam"	P. Susheela	03:26
"Ponasai Kondorku Ullam"	T. M. Soundararajan	02:03
"Thamarai Poo Kulathilae"	T. M. Soundararajan, P. Susheela	03:47
"Kottaiyile Oru Aalamaram"	Seergazhi Govindarajan	04:13
"Chevvandhi Poo Chendu Pola"	Soolamangalam Rajalakshmi	02:48
"Sirikkindra Mugaththai"	S. Janaki	03:05

== Reception ==
Dinakaran of the magazine Mutharam said the film, despite certain flaws, was watchable.
