= Thedi Vandha Mappillai =

1970 film by B. R. Panthulu

- Theatrical release poster
- Directed by: B. R. Panthulu
- Screenplay by: Padmini Pictures Story Department
- Story by: Rajasri
- Produced by: B. R. Panthulu
- Starring: M. G. Ramachandran; Jayalalithaa
- Cinematography: A. Shanmugam
- Edited by: R. Devarajan
- Music by: M. S. Viswanathan
- Production company: Padmini Pictures
- Release date: 29 August 1970
- Running time: 151 minutes
- Country: India
- Language: Tamil

Thedi Vandha Mappillai (transl. The Voluntary Groom) is a 1970 Indian Tamil-language film produced and directed by B. R. Panthulu. The film stars M. G. Ramachandran, Jayalalithaa, S. A. Ashokan, Major Sundarrajan, M. V. Rajamma and Cho Ramaswamy . It is a remake of Panthulu's 1967 Kannada film Beedi Basavanna. The film was released on 29 August 1970. It won the Tamil Nadu State Film Award for Best Film.

== Plot ==
The film begins with Solaimalai's eldest baby daughter being kidnapped. The baby eventually is saved by a passerby and is raised as his own daughter. Solaimalai's wife, Chellam, unable to bear her eldest baby daughter's loss, falls down a staircase and blames Solaimalai for his sins by attempting to murder his boss. Solaimalai's (named later in the film as Pasupathy's) boss is shot by Samundi, but the blame falls on Pasupathy. The surviving boss sends his wife Parvati Ammal and son Shankar into hiding, fearing his family's fate. But before breathing his last, the boss learns the truth and entrusts in Pasupathy the task of finding Parvati and Shankar and handing them their rightful family assets. He also changes his name from Solaimalai to Pasupathy fearing Samundi may seek revenge or murder him. Chellam, hearing the truth, finally hopes Pasupathi finds the true heir of his boss property heir, succumbs to her injury and dies.

Several years later, Shankar, now a grown up youth, learns of the injustice committed to his father, and heads out to Chennai in search of his father's murderer, Solaimalai. However he does not know Solaimalai by his new name, Pasupathi. Pasupathi vows to find Parvathi and Shankar and vows to get them married. Shankar meets Pasupathy's daughter, Uma, and falls in love with her, without knowing her background. It is shown to us, Pasupathi eldest daughter, Jaya was raised as Thirumangai by the passerby (now turned blind) and is shown as a pick-pocket who only steals 1 rupee in day. Suresh gets acquainted with Karpagam (Cho Ramaswamy).

Meanwhile, Suresh a criminal misunderstand Shankar as CID during their train journey. Suresh sends his men to follow Shankar and traps him to find Solaimalai. However, Shankar outwits his men and escapes with Uma's car coincidentally. Suresh notices Uma's car, and orders his man, Alangaaram, to spy on Uma and Shankar, still thinking that Shankar is spy sent to apprehend Suresh's illegal business. While escaping, both Uma and Shankar gets acquainted with Jaya.

Shankar soon finds that the car driven by Uma belongs to Solaimalai. Shankar sends a letter to his mother to find out more details about Solaimalai. Pasupathi advertises in a paper via Alangaaram (Suresh's man) for an English music teacher. Shankar, with the help of Karpagam and Jaya, disguises as an old English music teacher to find out the real Solaimalai. Thirumangai (a.k.a. Jaya) helps Uma to return her lost necklace. While returning the necklace, Thirumangai finds her own baby photo and the story about it. Pasupathi and Uma reveals she is Pasupathi's first born daughter and Uma's sister. Without knowing her own photo, Thirumangai (a.k.a. Jaya) vows to find Pasupathi's eldest daughter (herself). Suresh's man kidnaps Karpagam, whom both earlier on, in train journey. Karpagam assists Suresh to capture Shankar. However, during fight (as disguised old English music teacher), Shankar manages to bash them. However, Uma recognizes the disguise, but pretends not to know him and falls for Shankar.

Eventually, Samundi manages to find Solaimalai's house and threatens to kill him. Shankar, who turns out to be there, finds out the truth. Shankar fights with Samundi. Samundi manages to escape. Shankar gets injured in the fight. The scuffle is also watched by Alangaaram (Suresh's man). Alangaaram brings Shankar to a fake doctor and gives Shankar a sedative injection.

Soon, Suresh (S. A. Ashokan), a notorious criminal, imprisons Shankar and impersonates him for his wealth. Parvati is forced to play along, as Suresh threatens to kill Shankar. Thirumangai's foster father (blind man) becomes seriously ill and reveals her true identity to Karpagam. Karpagam sends money to his friend to buy medicine. However, his friend was pick-pocketed by Thirumangai. Thirumangai repents for her misdeed. Uma reveals to Parvathi that she loves Shankar. Parvati supports her decision, though Suresh is black-mailing her. Karpagam manages to find Shankar and Parvati being kidnapped and blackmailed respectively, and then hatches a plan to rescue both of them with the assistance of Thirumangai. Thirumangai manages to steal the entry token from Suresh and manages to rescue Shankar.

The movie ends with Shankar and Uma united together and Pasupathi manages to find his eldest daughter Jaya. Jaya marries Karpagam, who is a CID.

== Cast ==
Actor	Role
M. G. Ramachandran	as Shankar, (Music professor Edward, "Thotu Katava...")
S. A. Ashokan	as Suresh
Major Sundarrajan	as Pasupathy Rabhagavadhor (alias Solaimalai)
Cho Ramaswamy	as Karpagam
J.Jayalalithaa	as Uma Mageshswari
M. V. Rajamma	as Parvati Ammal, Shankar's mother
Jothilakshmi	as Jaya (alias Mangai Thirumangai)
Vijayasree	as seducer of the trap ("Sorgathai Theduvom...")
Gandhimathi	as Chellam, Pasupathy's wife
K. K. Soundar	as TTR
Rajakokila	as Radha, Uma Mageshswari 's friend
Ennatha Kannaiya	as jeweler
Justin	as Samoundhi
B. R. Panthulu (Not mentioned)	as Thanikachalam, Shankar's father (in photo)

== Soundtrack ==
The soundtrack was composed by M. S. Viswanathan.

No.	Title	Lyrics	Singer(s)	Length
1.	"Vetri Meethu Vetri Vanthu"	Vaali	S. P. Balasubrahmanyam	3:05
2.	"Adatha Ullagal"	Kannadasan	L. R. Eswari	3:44
3.	"Sorgathai Theduvom"	Kannadasan	T. M. Soundararajan	3:56
4.	"Idamo Sugamanathu (Naalu Pakkam Suvaru)"	Vaali	T. M. Soundararajan, P. Susheela	3:44
5.	"Thotu Katava"	Vaali	T. M. Soundararajan	3:42
6.	"Ada Aarumugam"	Vaali	T. M. Soundarrajan, P. Susheela	3:42
7.	"Maanikkka Theril Maragatha"	Kannadasan	T. M. Soundarrajan, P. Susheela	3:22
Total length:				25:15
