= Shivasharane Nambekka =

- Directed by: P. Neelakantan
- Produced by: B. R. Panthulu
- Starring: B. R. Panthulu; M. V. Rajamma
- Music by: T. G. Lingappa
- Production company: Padmini Pictures
- Release date: 1955
- Country: India
- Language: Kannada

Shivasharane Nambekka ( transl. Faith in Shiva) is a 1955 Indian Kannada-language film directed by P. Neelakantan. The movie had Rajendra Singh Babu and Ambareesh as child artists.

== Plot ==
The film depicts the life story of Saint Nambiyakka, a great devotee of Lord Shiva.

== Cast ==
- B. R. Panthulu
- M. Madhava Rao
- M. V. Rajamma
- Dikki Madhava Rao
- Rajasulochana
- Revathi
- M. N. Maheshwaramma
- B. Dasappa
- Master Rajendra Singh Babu
- Master Ambareesh

== Production ==
The film was produced by B. R. Panthulu under his own banner Padmini Pictures and was directed by P. Neelakantan.

The film was dubbed into Tamil with the title Sivasakthi and was released in 1956.

== Soundtrack ==
The music was composed by T. G. Lingappa for both Kannada and Tamil versions. All the tunes for all the songs for both languages are the same.

Kannada Songs

Playback singers are Seergazhi Govindarajan & Jikki.

Lyrics by Kanagal Prabhakara Shastry

No.	Song	Singers	Lyrics	Length
1	"Shambho Mahaadeva"	Seergazhi Govindarajan	Gundu Rao	03:35
2	"Guru Devo.... Parama Jaanavara"	Jikki		03:05

Tamil Songs

Playback singers are N. L. Ganasaraswathi, Jikki, R. Balasaraswathi Devi, M. S. Rajeswari & K. Rani.

No.	Song	Singers	Lyrics	Length
1	"Sundara Vadhaname"	N. L. Ganasaraswathi		03:13
2	"Maayaa Valaiyil Veezhndhu"	N. L. Ganasaraswathi		03:38
3	"Jeeva Paripalana"	Jikki	Ku. Ma. Balasubramaniam	02:51
4	"Mahadheva Maayai Theeraai"	Jikki	Ku. Ma. Balasubramaniam	02:20
5	"Sugame Ne Paadu"	M. S. Rajeswari	Ku. Ma. Balasubramaniam	02:21
6	"Aaha Aaha Naane Raani"	K. Rani	Ku. Ma. Balasubramaniam	02:20
7	"Kanne Thaalelo"	R. Balasaraswathi Devi	Ku. Ma. Balasubramaniam	03:16
