= Bhakta Prahlada (1942 Kannada film) =

- Directed by: K. Subramanyam; C. S. V. Iyer
- Screenplay by: Bellave Narahari Sastri
- Story by: Bellave Narahari Sastri
- Produced by: K. Subramanyam
- Starring: M. V. Rajamma; Chandramma; A. N. Sheshachar; K. V. Achuta Rao
- Production company: Kalaivani Films
- Release date: 1942
- Country: India
- Language: Kannada

Bhakta Prahlada ( transl. Prahalada, the devotee) is a 1942 Indian Kannada-language film directed by K. Subramanyam. The film stars M. V. Rajamma, Chandramma, A. N. Sheshachar and K. V. Achuta Rao. The film also saw Rajkumar's first appearance in a film. He played a school-going child alongside his brother S. P. Varadappa; their father Singanalluru Puttaswamayya played Akhandasura.

== Cast ==
- M. V. Rajamma
- Chandramma
- A. N. Sheshachar
- K. V. Achuta Rao
- Singanalluru Puttaswamayya as Akhandasura
- Rajkumar
- S. P. Varadappa
