= Kalyanam Panniyum Brahmachari =

- Theatrical release poster
- Directed by: P. Neelakantan
- Screenplay by: P. Neelakantan
- Story by: T. K. Govindan
- Produced by: B. R. Panthulu
- Starring: T. R. Ramachandran; Sivaji Ganesan; Padmini; Ragini
- Cinematography: V. Ramamoorthy
- Edited by: R. Devarajan
- Music by: T. G. Lingappa
- Production company: Padmini Pictures
- Distributed by: Madras Pictures
- Release date: 13 April 1954
- Country: India
- Language: Tamil

Kalyanam Panniyum Brahmachari (transl. A bachelor, even after marriage) is a 1954 Indian Tamil-language comedy film, directed by P. Neelakantan and produced by B. R. Panthulu. The film stars T. R. Ramachandran, Sivaji Ganesan, Padmini and Ragini. It was released on 13 April 1954 and became a box office success.

== Cast ==
- T. R. Ramachandran as Ganapathy
- Sivaji Ganesan as Ambalavanan
- Padmini as Padmini
- Ragini as Savithri
- K. D. Santhanam as Balasundaram
- M. A. Ganapathy
- M. N. Krishnan
- T. K. Kalyanam
- Krishna Bai
- Saradambal
- Hariharan, Dhanam

== Production ==
Kalyanam Panniyum Brahmachari was written and directed by P. Neelakantan, and produced by B. R. Panthulu under Padmini Pictures. The film became embroiled in a plagiarism controversy; playwright Vedam Venkataraya Sastri accused the makers of lifting the plot from his Telugu play Vyamoham. A notice was sent via lawyer N. K. Mohanrangam Pillai to Panthulu, who offered compensation to Sastri to avoid creating trouble before the film's release. Sastri wanted his name to be shown in the film's credits, but this request was outrightly refused by Panthulu. Sastri filed a copyright infringement case with Mohanrangam Pillai as his lawyer, but ultimately lost the case even after appealing. A few sequences from the 1952 Bengali film Pasher Bari were reported to have been copied in bits in this film.

== Soundtrack ==
The music was composed by T. G. Lingappa. The song "Jolly Life Jolly Life" which actor J. P. Chandrababu had sung as playback for Sivaji Ganesan, and "Vennilavum Vaanum Pole" became popular. This song is set to Jayanthasena, a Carnatic raga.

Song	Singers	Lyrics	Length
"Vennilavum Vaanum Pole"	Radha Jayalakshmi	Bharathidasan	04:06
"Kaviyin Kanavil Vaazhum Kaviyame"	V. N. Sundaram	K. D. Santhanam	03:31
"Madhu Malar Ellam Pudhu Manam Veesi"	Radha Jayalakshmi	K. D. Santhanam	03:30
"Yedhu Kitthanai...Medhavi Pole Edhedho Pesi"	A. M. Rajah & Jikki	K. D. Santhanam	04:18
"Azhage Aanandham"	Soolamangalam Rajalakshmi	K. D. Santhanam	02:58
"Jolly Life Jolly Life"	J. P. Chandrababu	K. D. Santhanam	03:25
"Paraman Arulai Perum Maargamaa"	Jikki	K. D. Santhanam	04:06
"Naagareegama Idhu Naagareegama"	T. V. Rathnam	K. D. Santhanam	
"Pudhu Ulaga Sirpigal Naameh"	Jikki	K. D. Santhanam	
"Enna Sikichchai Unakku Vendum"	Ghantasala	K. D. Santhanam	02:24
"Azhage Penn Vadivamaana"	V. N. Sundaram & Soolamangalam Rajalakshmi	K. D. Santhanam	03:31

== Release and reception ==
Kalyanam Panniyum Brahmachari was released on 13 April 1954, and distributed by Madras Pictures. Thought wrote, "This Padmini Pictures release confirms that Tamil films require a good deal of 'polishing up.' They lack just that quality to be aesthetically perfect." The film was successful at the box office and established Ramachandran as a famous comedian in Tamil cinema.
