= School Master (1958 film) =

- Poster
- Directed by: B. R. Panthulu
- Produced by: B. R. Panthulu
- Starring: B.R. Panthulu; Dikki Madhava Rao; Udaykumar; Sivaji Ganesan; Gemini Ganesan; B. Saroja Devi
- Cinematography: W. R. Subba Rao; Karnan
- Edited by: R. Devarajan
- Music by: T. G. Lingappa
- Distributed by: Padmini Pictures
- Release date: 31 January 1958
- Running time: 164 minutes
- Country: India
- Language: Kannada

School Master is a 1958 Indian Kannada-language film produced and directed by B. R. Panthulu. The film stars Panthulu himself in the lead role along with Dikki Madhava Rao, M. V. Rajamma, Udaykumar, Sivaji Ganesan, Gemini Ganesan and B. Saroja Devi in key roles. This was the first Kannada film to complete a silver jubilee. The film features a children's dance drama in Gevacolor, filmed by cinematographer W. R. Subba Rao. It was later remade in Telugu, Tamil, Malayalam and Hindi in spite of it being dubbed in Tamil and Telugu as Engal Kudumbam Perisu (transl. Our family is big) and Badi Pantulu respectively.

In 1959, ALS Productions remade it in Hindi as School Master which was also directed by Panthulu. The film was remade in Malayalam in 1964 as School Master by Puttanna Kanagal, in Telugu in 1972 as Badi Panthulu and in Tamil in 1973 as School Master.

School Master was the first Kannada film to be remade in four languages and also the first Kannada film to be remade in three other South Indian languages. The movie is based on 1937 English movie Make Way for Tomorrow which has been adapted multiple times including in Japanese as Tokyo Story (1953), in Marathi as Oon Paus (1954), in Tamil as Varavu Nalla Uravu (1990), in Urdu as Samaj (1972) and twice in Hindi as Zindagi (1976) and Baghban (2003).

== Plot ==
Ranganna is a newly appointed headmaster in a government-run village primary school, where he admits his children. Gundappa is a peon at the school. A disciplinarian, Ranganna lives with his three children and wife, Seetha. His elder son Gopi gets into fight with a troublesome student, Vasu. Although Vasu is punished, his innate goodness wins over his teacher and he is given special attention to become a better student.

Nagappa, the corrupt chairperson of the village panchayat frequently clashes with the honest Ranganna and the district authorities. Upset over Ranganna's refusal to campaign for him in the upcoming elections, Nagappa burns down Ranganna's house. However, Ranganna's young students, led by Vasu, build a house for their teacher. Ranganna's efforts to convert the primary school into a high school are temporarily stalled when Nagappa steals the funds meant for the project and blames Ranganna for the money going missing. Nagappa is eventually caught and sentenced to seven years in prison.

Years later, Vasu tops his matriculation exams. Ranganna's sons marry — Gopi to Radha, Nagappa's daughter, and Ravikumar to Geetha, much against the parents' wishes. However, the parents accept these unions. Ranganna's daughter, Gowri, marries a simple businessman, Puttanna. Upon Ranganna's retirement, his sons are reluctant to take in their parents. With no savings of his own, Ranganna must rely on them to support his retired life. Gopi and Ravikumar reluctantly agree to take in one parent each. Gopi takes his father, while Ravikumar takes their mother. As a result, Ranganna is separated from his wife.

Over time, Ranganna’s eyesight deteriorates, and he is unable to even read his wife's letters because his son refuses to provide him with spectacles. Both Ranganna and his wife are mistreated by their daughters-in-law, prompting them to leave their sons’ homes.

Meanwhile, Ranganna’s house, built by his students, is put up for auction. Vasu, now a Superintendent of Police, happens to pass by and notices the auction. In the climax, he buys the house and hands it over to Ranganna and Seetha, who have now been reunited. Ranganna is overwhelmed with emotion as he sees his once troublesome student has transformed into a role model. His journey as a teacher has come full circle, ending on a note of satisfaction.

== Cast ==
- B. R. Panthulu as Ranganna
- Dikki Madhava Rao as Nagappa
- M. V. Rajamma as Seetha
- Udaykumar as Ravikumar
- Sowcar Janaki as Geetha
- T. N. Balakrishna as Gundappa
- B. Saroja Devi as Radha
- Narasimharaju as Puttanna
- Sivaji Ganesan as Vasu
- Soorya Kumar as Gopi
- S. Vimala
- Annapoornamma
- Lakshmi as Padma (credited as Baby Lakshmi)
- Kusumalatha
- Gemini Ganesan

== Soundtrack ==
The film's score was composed by T. G. Lingappa.

=== Kannada version ===
Song	Singers	Lyrics	Length (m:ss)
"Ati Madhuraa Anu Raaga"	A. M. Rajah & K. Jamuna Rani		03:27
"Ellaru Nammavare"	A. P. Komala		03:06
"Raadhaa Maadhava Vinodha Haasa"	T. G. Lingappa & P. Susheela		03:12
"Innenu Aananda"	Soolamangalam Rajalakshmi		03:02
"Swami Devane Loka Paalane"	T. G. Lingappa, A. P. Komala & K. Rani		02:39
"Bannirai Bannirai"	A. P. Komala & K. Rani		02:58
"Naanu Neenu Jodi"	Pithapuram Nageswara Rao & Soolamangalam Rajalakshmi		03:23
"Bhaameya Nodalu"	Soolamangalam Rajalakshmi		03:12
"Sompaada Sanjevele"	T. G. Lingappa & P. Susheela		03:27
""	A. P. Komala & K. Rani		06:48

=== Tamil version ===
The Tamil version is titled Engal Kudumbam Perisu.

Song	Singers	Lyrics	Length (m:ss)
"Adhi Madhuraa Anu Raaga"	A. M. Rajah & K. Jamuna Rani	K. D. Santhanam	03:27
"Ellaarum Nammavare"	A. P. Komala	Ku. Saa. Krishnamurthi	03:06
"Raadhaa Maadhava Vinodha Raaja"	T. M. Soundararajan & P. Susheela	Ku. Saa. Krishnamurthi	03:12
"Ennaalum Kaanaadha Aanandhame"	Soolamangalam Rajalakshmi	Ku. Ma. Balasubramaniam	03:02
"Somasekara Loga Paalane"	T. G. Lingappa, A. P. Komala & K. Rani	K. D. Santhanam	02:39
"Varugave Varugave Guru Sevaiye"	A. P. Komala & K. Rani	K. D. Santhanam	02:58
"Naanum Neeyum Jodi"	S. C. Krishnan & Soolamangalam Rajalakshmi	K. D. Santhanam	03:23
" "	Soolamangalam Rajalakshmi		03:12
"Sugamaana Andhi Velai"	T. M. Soundararajan & P. Susheela	Ku. Saa. Krishnamurthi	02:42
"Aahaa En Jaanakiyai"	A. P. Komala & K. Rani	K. D. Santhanam	06:48

=== Telugu version ===
The Telugu version is titled Badi Pantulu.

Song	Singers	Lyrics	Length
"Atimadhuram Anuraagam"	A. M. Rajah & K. Jamuna Rani		03:27
"Rampaana Vadenaa"	A. P. Komala		03:06
"Radhaa Madhava Vinodaleela"	P. B. Sreenivas & P. Susheela		03:12
"Jaagela Ananda Mandeeyaraa"	Soolamangalam Rajalakshmi		03:02
"Kshemasaagaraa Lokapaalanaa"	T. G. Lingappa, A. P. Komala & K. Rani		02:39
"Padamdoy Padamdoy Padamdoy"	A. P. Komala & K. Rani		02:58
"Neevu Nenu Jodu Ee Eddula Sakketa Choodu"	Pithapuram Nageswara Rao & Soolamangalam Rajalakshmi		03:23
"Bhaamanu Jerava Gopaalaa"	Soolamangalam Rajalakshmi		03:12
"Undaali Sampaadana Jagati"	P. B. Sreenivas & P. Susheela		02:42
""	A. P. Komala & K. Rani		06:48

== Release and Reception ==
It became the first Kannada film to complete a 25-week run and celebrate a silver jubilee.

== Awards ==
National Film Awards

- 1959 – All India Certificate of Merit for Third Best Feature film
- 1959 – National Film Award for Best Feature Film in Kannada
