= Amma (1968 film) =

- Directed by: B. R. Panthulu
- Written by: G. V. Iyer (dialogues)
- Screenplay by: Padmini Pictures
- Story by: G. Balasubramanyam
- Produced by: B. R. Panthulu
- Starring: Rajkumar; Bharathi; B. R. Panthulu; M. V. Rajamma
- Cinematography: A. Shanmugam
- Edited by: R. Devarajan
- Music by: T. G. Lingappa
- Production company: Padmini Pictures
- Release date: 17 September 1968
- Running time: 170 min
- Country: India
- Language: Kannada

Amma is a 1968 Indian Kannada-language film, directed and produced by B. R. Panthulu. The film stars Rajkumar, Bharathi, B. R. Panthulu and M. V. Rajamma. The film has musical score by T. G. Lingappa. In a small drama sequence, he appeared as Babruvahana. In another sequence, the tragic climax of William Shakespeare's Romeo and Juliet was adapted on – screen in English with Rajkumar playing the role of Romeo and Bharathi as Juliet.

== Cast ==
- Rajkumar as Sridhar
- Bharathi Vishnuvardhan as Mala
- B. R. Panthulu Sridhar's father
- M. V. Rajamma as Seetha, Sridhar's mother
- K. S. Ashwath as Vasu
- Pandari Bai in a cameo
- Narasimharaju as Kitti
- Mynavathi
- Dinesh as Lingaraju
- H. R. Shastry
- Basappa
- Comedian Guggu
- L. N. Swamy
- Shankar
- Ranganath
- Shyam
- Mallesh
- Raju
- Jr. Dinesh
- Shekar
- Master Krishnakumar as young Sridhar
- Papamma
- Seethalakshmi
- Suguna
- Shantha
- Susheela

== Soundtrack ==
The music was composed by T. G. Lingappa.

No.	Song	Singers	Lyrics	Length (m:ss)
1	"Raathriyali Malebandu"	P. Nageswara Rao, L. R. Eswari	Vijaya Narasimha	03:22
2	"Bangaara Vaagali"	P. B. Sreenivas, S. Janaki	G. V. Iyer	03:00
3	"Dharmave Jayavemba"	M. Balamurali Krishna	Purandaradasa	02:35
4	"Entha Cheluva Naguvo"	Bangalore Latha, P. B. Srinivas		3:00
