= Sri Krishnadevaraya (film) =

- Directed by: B. R. Panthulu
- Screenplay by: B. R. Panthulu
- Produced by: B. R. Panthulu
- Starring: Rajkumar; R. Nagendra Rao; B. R. Panthulu; N. Bharathi
- Cinematography: A. Shanmugam
- Edited by: R. Devarajan
- Music by: T. G. Lingappa
- Production company: Venus Combimes
- Distributed by: Padmini Pictures
- Release date: 1970
- Running time: 194 minutes
- Country: India
- Language: Kannada

Sri Krishnadevaraya is a 1970 Indian Kannada-language historical drama film, produced and directed by B. R. Panthulu. It stars Rajkumar as Krishnadevaraya, an emperor of the Vijayanagara Empire in the 16th century. R. Nagendra Rao, B. R. Panthulu, Narasimharaju and N. Bharathi appear in pivotal roles. This was Rajkumar's first color film.

The film won three awards at the 1969–70 Karnataka State Film Awards: Best Actor (B. R. Panthulu), Best Actress (N. Bharathi) and Best Music Director (T. G. Lingappa). The movie saw a theatrical run of 28 weeks.

When the State Government adjudged him the best actor for Thimmarasa's role, B.R. Panthulu modestly turned it down, saying the award must go to Rajkumar for the electrifying lead role. In a letter dated 23 September 1970, he cited that Rajkumar, who played Krishnadevaraya, was more deserving of the award. After this incident, the Karnataka Government started two separate category of awards - one for the lead roles and another for the supporting roles. The movie was dubbed in Telugu in 1971 as Sri Krishnadevarayalu.

== Cast ==
- Rajkumar as Krishnadevaraya
- N. Bharathi as Chinna Devi
- Jayanthi as Tirumalamba Devi
- R. Nagendra Rao as Gajapathi Prataparudra
- R. N. Sudarshan as Panda Chieftain
- B. R. Panthulu as Mahamantri Timmarusu
- M. V. Rajamma as Kamala, Mahamantri Timmarusu's wife
- Narasimharaju as Tenali Ramakrishna
- Mynavathi as Janaki, Tenali Ramakrishna's wife
- Chindodi Leela
- Vijayasree
- B. Jaya
- Dinesh as Achyuta Deva Raya
- H. R. Shastry as Janaki's father

== Soundtrack ==
Sri Krishnadevaraya

Soundtrack album by T. G. Lingappa
- Released: 1969
- Genre: Feature film soundtrack
- Length: 29:20
- Label: Saregama

T. G. Lingappa composed the film's music and the lyrics for the soundtrack were written by K. Prabhakara Shastry and Vijaya Narasimha. The soundtrack album comprises nine tracks.

Track listing
No.	Title	Lyrics	Singer(s)	Length
1.	"Sharanu Virupaksha Shashishekara"	K. Prabhakara Shastry	S. Janaki	4:12
2.	"Khana Peena"	Pandit Deepak Chakravarti	S. Janaki	3:25
3.	"Bahujanmada Poojaphala"	K. Prabhakara Shastry	P. B. Sreenivas, S. Janaki	2:59
4.	"Sri Chamundeshwari"	K. Prabhakara Shastry	P. Leela, Sirkazhi Govindarajan	3:18
5.	"Chennarasi Cheluvarasi"	K. Prabhakara Shastry	S. Janaki, A.P.Komala
6.	"Baa Veera Kannadiga"	Vijaya Narasimha	Pithapuram Nageswara Rao	1:55
7.	"Kalyanaadbhuta + Tirupatigirivasa"	K. Prabhakara Shastry	P. Susheela, P. B. Sreenivas, S. Janaki	3:14
8.	"Krishnana Hesare Lokapriya"	Vijaya Narasimha	Soolamangalam Rajalakshmi, P. B. Sreenivas, S. Janaki	4:17
9.	"Makkal Nakkare"		Sirkazhi Govindarajan	2:42
Total length:				29:20

== Awards ==
Filmfare Awards South

- Filmfare Award for Best Film – Kannada (1970)

1969–70 Karnataka State Film Awards

- Best Actor - B. R. Panthulu
- Best Actress - N. Bharathi
- Best Music Director - T. G. Lingappa

This film screened at IFFI 1992 B R Panthalu Homage section.
