= Pempudu Koothuru =

- Theatrical release poster
- Directed by: B. R. Panthulu
- Screenplay by: D. V. Narasa Raju
- Story by: Iraa Shanmugam
- Produced by: B. R. Panthulu
- Starring: N. T. Rama Rao; Sowcar Janaki; Devika
- Cinematography: V. Ram Murthy
- Edited by: D. Devaraju
- Music by: T. G. Lingappa
- Production company: Padmini Pictures
- Release date: 6 February 1963
- Running time: 158 mins
- Country: India
- Language: Telugu

Pempudu Koothuru (transl. Foster Daughter) is a 1963 Indian Telugu-language drama film, produced and directed by B. R. Panthulu. It stars N. T. Rama Rao, Sowcar Janaki, Devika with music composed by T. G. Lingappa. The film was simultaneously made in Kannada as Saaku Magalu by the same banner and director.

== Cast ==
- N. T. Rama Rao as Raghu
- Sowcar Janaki as Manjula
- Devika as Uma
- Haranath as Vaasu
- Relangi as Dasavataram R
- Ramana Reddy as Tirupati
- Balakrishna as Shankaram
- Malathi as Seetamma
- Kutty Padmini
- Y. V. Raju
- Lanka Satyam as Simhachalam

== Soundtrack ==
Pempudu Koothuru

Film score by T. G. Lingappa
- Released: 1963
- Genre: Soundtrack
- Length: 23:19
- Producer: T. G. Lingappa

Music composed by T. G. Lingappa.

| S. No. | Song title | Lyrics | Singers | length |
|---|---|---|---|---|
| 1 | "Cheppina Maatenanuko" | Kosaraju | Ghantasala | 2:56 |
| 2 | "Kannula Vindav Andaalu" | Anishetty | P. B. Srinivas, P. Susheela | 3:24 |
| 3 | "Jeevana Raagam" | Anishetty | S. Janaki | 3:15 |
| 4 | "Nee Jaada Kananaitiraa" | C. Narayana Reddy | P. Leela | 4:50 |
| 5 | "Naaku Kanulu Levu" | C. Narayana Reddy | P. Susheela | 3:43 |
| 6 | "Evi Veluturulevi" | C. Narayana Reddy | Ghantasala | 3:21 |
| 7 | "Naaku Kanulu Levu" (Sad) | C. Narayana Reddy | P. Susheela | 1:50 |
