= Naam Iruvar (1947 film) =

1947 film by A. V. Meiyappan

- Theatrical release poster
- Directed by: A. V. Meiyappan
- Written by: Pa. Neelakantan
- Based on: Thyaga Ullam by Pa. Neelakantan
- Produced by: A. V. Meiyappan
- Starring: T. R. Mahalingam; T. A. Jayalakshmi
- Cinematography: T. Muthusamy
- Edited by: M. V. Raman
- Music by: R. Sudarsanam
- Production company: AVM Productions
- Release date: 12 January 1947
- Running time: 153 minutes
- Country: India
- Language: Tamil

Naam Iruvar (English: We Two) is a 1947 Indian Tamil-language drama film directed and produced by A. V. Meiyappan. It is based on the play Thyaga Ullam written by Pa. Neelakantan. The film stars T. R. Mahalingam and T. A. Jayalakshmi. It was released on 12 January 1947 and became a success.

== Plot ==
Sukumar, the son of a black-marketeer, falls in the company of evil friends and invests his money in making a film in accordance with their advice. However, the film never sees the light of the day and leaves Sukumar heavy in debt. He is eventually questioned by financiers and when he fails to pay them, is dragged to court. How he is rescued from his perilous situation forms the climax of the story. At the end of the film, Sukumar becomes a nationalist and a Gandhian.

== Cast ==
Male cast

- T. R. Mahalingam as Sukumar
- B. R. Panthulu as Jayakumar
- K. Sarangapani as Ramasamy Pillai
- T. R. Ramachandran as Gnanodhayam
- V. K. Ramasamy as Shanmugam Pillai
- T. K. Ramachandran as Viswam
- V. K. Karthikeyan as Hanumantha Rao
- S. P. Chellappa as Rahim
- N. C. Menon as Police Sub Inspector
- S. L. Narayanan as Muniyan
- R. Viswanathan as Kamatchiya Pillai
- C. Natarajan as Periyanna Pillai
- Janardhanan as Seenu Pillai
- V. S. Srinivasan as Accountant

Female cast

- T. A. Jayalakshmi as Kannamma
- Baby Kamala as Kamala
- K. R. Chellam as Ambujam
- A. S. Jaya as Leela
- Chitti as Thripuasundara Devi
- D. Lakshmi Bai as Mohini
- M. R. Visalatchi as Miss Susheela

== Production ==
Based on a play Thyaga Ullam written by Pa. Neelakantan, which itself was based on the story of the 1936 film Iru Sahodarargal, Naam Iruvar was directed and produced by A.V. Meiyappan. The film released in January, a few months before India's independence after six months of shooting and was a "thundering success". The story begins with a Subramania Bharati anniversary and ends with Gandhi's 77th birthday celebrations. A notable feature of the movie were its songs which were written by Indian nationalist Subramaniya Bharati and sung by D. K. Pattammal.

The film is remembered for the dance performances of Baby Kamala. It is also remembered as the first film produced under the banner of AVM Productions. Following the success of the film, AVM moved his studio from Karaikudi to Kodambakkam in Chennai. Nam Iruvar was also the last film directed by A. V. Meiyappan and extensively portrayed the hopes and aspirations of a nation on the brink of independence.

S. V. Sahasranamam who acted and directed the play was initially considered for the leading role. but couldn't take up the film due to other commitments hence he was replaced by T. R. Mahalingam. The film also marked the debut of V. K. Ramasamy who appeared in the role of an evil old man at the age of 21. The film, primarily in black-and-white, was released with a few sequences in colour.

== Songs ==
Music was composed by R. Sudarasanam and lyrics were written by Mahakavi Bharathiar, K. P. Kamatchi, V. S. Veeranatha Konar and M. Raghavan. The song "Aaduvome" was written by Subramaniya Bharathi while other two songs were written by K. P. Kamatchisundaram. Historian Randor Guy wrote that the film was remembered for "The scintillating song and dance numbers, ‘Aaaduvomey…..’ and ‘Vetri Ettum’, performed by ‘Baby’ Kamala".

Song	Singer	Lyrics	Length
"Vetri Ettu Dhikkum Etta"	D. K. Pattammal	Subramania Bharati	04:13
"Aaduvome Pallu Paaduvome"	D. K. Pattammal	Subramania Bharati	04:53
"Vaazhiya Sendhamizhar Vaazhiya Natramizhar"	Devanarayanan, T. S. Bhagavathi	Subramania Bharati	
"Viduthalai Viduthalai Viduthalai"	T. R. Mahalingam	Subramania Bharati	01:33
"Solai Malar Oliyo"	T. R. Mahalingam, T. S. Bhagavathi	Subramania Bharati	03:16
"Iga Vaazhvinile Aaanandham"	T. R. Mahalingam, T. S. Bhagavathi	K. P. Kamatchisundaram	02:46
"Jega Meedhile Mei Kaadhalthaane"	T. R. Mahalingam, T. S. Bhagavathi	K. P. Kamatchisundaram	02:08
"Vasandham Tharum Maalai"	T. S. Bagavathi	K. P. Kamatchisundaram	02:35
"Udal Aaviyum Pol"	T. S. Bagavathi	K. P. Kamatchisundaram	02:55
"Maalai Neramidhe Kola Kuyil Koovudhe"	T. S. Bagavathi	K. P. Kamatchisundaram	01:59
"Amudhinai Vishamendru"	Devanarayanan	K. P. Kamatchisundaram	02:05
"Devaamudha Mozhiyaale"	T. R. Mahalingam	K. P. Kamatchisundaram	02:10
"Karunaamoorthi Gaandhi Mahaathmaa"	M. S. Rajeswari	K. P. Kamatchisundaram	02:01
"Mahaan, Gaandhiye Mahaane"	M. S. Rajeswari	K. P. Kamatchisundaram	03:27
"Thagamai Seyr Amuthinai"	P. G. Venkatesan	K. P. Kamatchisundaram	01:37
"Kodaiyile Ilaipaatrikolla"	T. R. Mahalingam	Vallalar Ramalinga Adigal Arudpa	04:55

== Reception ==
The reviewer for The Indian Express called the film "an interesting social drama well acted with the additional attraction of a few songs of the great Bharathi rendered by Mahalingam. Baby Kamala is responsible for some good dance numbers." Randor Guy wrote that the concept "had nothing to do with the freedom movement, but it had everything to do with perceptively capturing the spirit of the times, making it a hit".

== Bibliography ==
- Dhananjayan, G. (2014). Pride of Tamil Cinema: 1931–2013. Blue Ocean Publishers. OCLC 898765509.
