= School Master (1964 film) =

- Directed by: S. R. Puttanna Kanagal
- Written by: Kusumagraj; Ponkunnam Varkey (dialogues)
- Produced by: B. R. Panthulu
- Starring: Prem Nazir; K. Balaji; Ragini; Thikkurissy Sukumaran Nair
- Music by: G. Devarajan
- Release date: 3 April 1964
- Country: India
- Language: Malayalam

School Master is a 1964 Indian Malayalam-language film, directed by debutant S. R. Puttanna Kanagal. Produced by B. R. Panthulu, it was a remake of producer's 1958 Kannada movie School Master. The film stars Prem Nazir, K. Balaji, Ragini and Thikkurissy Sukumaran Nair. The film had musical score by G. Devarajan.

== Plot ==
The film revolves around an old school master and his noble attempt to transform the students of his native village.

== Cast ==
- Thikkurissy Sukumaran Nair as School Head Master Raman Pilla
- Aranmula Ponnamma as School Master's wife
- Prem Nazir as Aniyan
- K. Balaji
- T. S. Muthaiah as School Manager Shekharan Nair
- Ragini as Sarala
- Ambika as Visalam
- Sivaji Ganesan as Johny
- Sowcar Janaki as Wife of Johny (guest appearance)
- Adoor Bhasi as Appunni Nair
- Bahadoor as Damodharan
- S. P. Pillai as Kuttan Pilla
- Pankajavalli as Bhavaniyamma
- Kalpana as Vasanthi
- Prathapachandran as Gopala Pilla
- Ramesh
- Kutty Padmini
- Vidhubala (Child Artist)

== Themes ==
B. Vijayakumar of The Hindu wrote, "School Master focused on undesirable practices of school managements. A successful social film it propagated integral morals and glorified teacher-student relationship."

== Soundtrack ==
The music was composed by G. Devarajan and the lyrics were written by Vayalar Ramavarma.

No.	Song	Singers	Lyrics	Length
1	"Anthimayangiyallo"	K. J. Yesudas, P. Leela	Vayalar Ramavarma	
2	"Gurur Brahma"	K. J. Yesudas		
3	"Iniyente Inakkilikku"	K. J. Yesudas, P. Susheela	Vayalar Ramavarma	
4	"Jayajayajaya Janmmabhoomi"	K. J. Yesudas, Chorus, T. Santha	Vayalar Ramavarma	
5	"Kilukilukkum"	M. S. Rajeswari	Vayalar Ramavarma	
6	"Niranja Kannukalode"	P. B. Sreenivas	Vayalar Ramavarma	
7	"Paravakalaay Pirannirunnengil"	P. Susheela	Vayalar Ramavarma	
8	"Thaamarakkulakkadavil"	P. Susheela, A. M. Rajah	Vayalar Ramavarma	
9	"Zindabaad Zindabaad"	P. Leela, A. P. Komala, Chorus	Vayalar Ramavarma	
