= M. V. Rajamma =

Indian actress and producer (1918–1999)

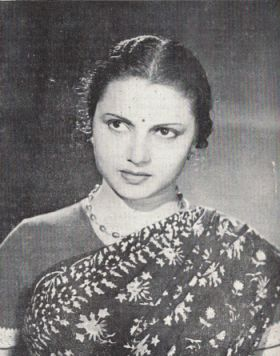
- Rajamma in the 1940s
- Born: 10 March 1921; Akandanahalli, Kingdom of Mysore, British India (now Karnataka, India)
- Died: 6 July 2000 (aged 79); Chennai, Tamil Nadu, India
- Occupations: Actress, film producer, playback singer
- Years active: 1932–1985
- Spouse: M. C. Veerappa
- Parent(s): Subbamma & Nanjappa

M. V. Rajamma (10 March 1921 – 6 July 2000) was an Indian actress, producer and playback singer of films mostly in Tamil, Kannada and Telugu languages from the 1930s through 1970s. She has the distinction of having acted as both heroine and mother to stalwart South Indian actors such as Dr. Rajkumar, Sivaji Ganesan, MGR and NTR. Karnataka Government established M. V. Rajamma Award in her honor.

Making her debut as a lead actress in the 1936 released Kannada movie Samsara Nauka though she was part of the 1932 silent film Hari Maya, which was produced by Gubbi Veeranna and starred B. Jayamma. Rajamma enjoyed an elaborate career in feature films across South India. She was the first and foremost woman producer in South India and in Kannada films. She produced the film Radha Ramana in 1943 under her own home banner Vijaya Films. Her entry to theTamil films was through the 1940 classic hit film Uthama Puthiran. She went on to star in about 60 Kannada, 80 Tamil, 20 Telugu and one Hindi films in her career spanning over five decades

== Early life ==
Rajamma was born in 1921 at Agandanahalli, a village in today's Bangalore Urban district, hitherto a part of Kingdom of Mysore. Her father Nanjappa, a merchant, was fond of stage and encouraged her to act. Rajamma joined the theatre group Chandrakala Nataka Mandali as a teenager and performed in plays alongside B. R. Panthulu, who she would go on to collaborate frequently on stage and in films. She did her schooling at the Arya Balika school in Bangalore till the 8th grade. She later shifted base to Chennai for doing films.

== Career ==
In the early 1930s, Rajamma was attracted to the stage theatre and entered the field at a time when male actors disguised themselves to play female characters. Rajamma enacted several inspiring roles in dramas such as Samsara Nauke, Gauthama Buddha and Subhadra. In 1935, when one of her stage plays Samsara Nauke was made into a film, she was cast again as the lead actress opposite to Panthulu. They went on to work together in many films for about 20 years. In 1940, she entered Tamil film industry in Chennai with the film Uthama Puthiran. From then on, she became one of the most sought after actresses across all the South Indian film industries. After her marriage, she concentrated mainly on playing motherly roles to the actors whom she had paired as a heroine earlier.

In 1943, Rajamma took her career to another level by producing the Kannada film Radha Ramana directed by Jyothish Sinha that featured herself opposite B. R. Panthulu in the lead. Acclaimed artists such as Balakrishna and G. V. Iyer were introduced through this film. It went on to perform well at the box-office which resulted in her second production venture Makkala Rajya (1960). Though the film was lauded by the critics, the box-office collections soared which made her back off from film production for a long while. However, she went on to star in many box-office blockbusters in both Kannada and Tamil film industries.

Some of the most popular Kannada films featuring Rajamma as a lead actress were Bhakta Prahalada (1942), Rathnagiri Rahasya (1957), School Master (1958), Abba Aa Hudugi (1959) among others.

== Awards ==
- 1997-98 - Dr. Rajkumar Lifetime Achievement Award by the Karnataka Government.

== Selected filmography ==
Year	Film	Language	Role	Notes
1935	Samsara Nauka	Kannada	Sarala	Debut as actor
1938	Yayathi	Tamil	Devayani	
1940	Uthama Puthiran	Tamil	Meenatchi	
1941	Gumasthavin Penn	Tamil	Seetha	
1941	Madana Kama Rajan	Tamil	Sathyavathi	
1942	Ananthasayanam	Tamil	Susheela	
1942	Bhakta Prahlada	Kannada		
1943	Radha Ramana	Kannada		
1945	Mayalokam	Telugu		
1946	Arthanaari	Tamil	Punyavathi	
1946	Vijayalakshmi	Tamil	Vijayalakshmi	
1947	Yogi Vemana	Telugu		
1948	Gnana Soundari	Tamil	Gnana Soundari	
1948	Gokuladasi	Tamil	Anuradha	
1949	Velaikari	Tamil	Amritham	
1950	Laila Majnu	Tamil	Layla	
1950	Parijatham	Tamil	Rukmini	
1950	Raja Vikrama	Tamil	Kamini	
1952	Thai Ullam	Tamil	Nirmala	
1952	Penn Manam	Tamil	Meenakshi	
1952	Zamindar	Tamil	Allikulam	
1953	Ulagam	Tamil	Meena	
1954	Karkottai	Tamil		
1954	Iddaru Pellalu	Telugu	Radha	
1955	Modala Thedi	Kannada		
1955	Shivasharane Nambekka	Kannada		
1957	Thangamalai Ragasiyam	Tamil	Kumutha	
1957	Rathnagiri Rahasya	Kannada		
1957	Manalane Mangayin Bhagyam	Tamil		
1958	School Master	Kannada	Seetha	
1958	Engal Kudumbam Perisu	Tamil		
1958	Illarame Nallaram	Tamil	Malathi	
1959	Bhaaga Pirivinai	Tamil	Meenakshi	
1959	Abba Aa Hudugi	Kannada		
1960	Kuzhandaigal Kanda Kudiyarasu	Tamil		
1960	Makkala Rajya	Kannada		
1960	Kairaasi	Tamil		
1961	Kittur Chennamma	Kannada	Rudrambe	
1961	Paava Mannippu	Tamil	Maragatham	
1961	Thayilla Pillai	Tamil	Parvathi	
1962	Padithal Mattum Podhuma	Tamil	Rao Bahadur's wife	
1962	Aadi Perukku	Tamil	Parvathi	
1962	Kudumba Thalaivan	Tamil	Velamma	
1962	Thayi Karulu	Kannada		
1962	Deivathin Deivam	Tamil		
1962	Gaali Gopura	Kannada	Shantha	
1962	Gaali Medalu	Kannada		
1962	Bandha Pasam	Tamil	Meenakshi	
1962	Paadha Kaanikkai	Tamil	Parvathi	
1963	Panathottam	Tamil	Thangamma	
1963	Dharmam Thalai Kaakkum	Tamil	Sadanandam's wife	
1963	Sathi Shakthi	Kannada		
1963	Kunkhumam	Tamil	Vedhavalli	
1964	Chinnada Gombe	Kannada	Meenakshi	
1964	Pasamum Nesamum	Tamil		
1964	Vazkai Vazhvatharke	Tamil		
1964	Karnan	Tamil	Kunti Devi	
1964	Muradan Muthu	Tamil	Maruthamuthu's wife	
1965	Thayin Karunai	Tamil		
1965	Vaazhkai Padagu	Tamil		
1966	Enga Paapa	Tamil		
1966	Emme Thammanna	Kannada	Kaveri	
1966	Dudde Doddappa	Kannada	Sharada	
1968	Amma	Kannada	Seetha	
1970	Sri Krishnadevaraya	Kannada	Kamala	
1970	Thedi Vandha Mappillai	Tamil	Parvati Ammal	
1971	Thayi Devaru	Kannada	Gowri	
1971	Malathi Madhava	Kannada		
1972	Jaga Mecchida Maga	Kannada	Kausalyadevi	
1972	Ondu Hennina Kathe	Kannada		
1972	Badi Panthulu	Telugu		
1974	Bangaarada Panjara	Kannada	Nanjamma	
1974	Sampathige Savaal	Kannada	Parvathi	
1975	Daari Tappida Maga	Kannada	Prakash and Prasad's mother	
1975	Thrimurthy	Kannada	Savitri	
1976	Besuge	Kannada	Nagu	
