= P. Neelakantan =

Indian film director (1916–1992)

P. Neelakandan
- Born: Palaniyandi Neelakandan; 2 October 1916; Villupuram
- Died: 3 September 1992 (aged 75); Chennai
- Occupation: Film director

Palaniyandi Neelakandan (2 October 1916 – 3 September 1992) was a Tamil film director, who was active for nearly four decades.

== Life ==
He was born at Villupuram, Tamil Nadu. He graduated to movies from stage play. His play Naam Iruvar was brought by movie mogul Avichi Meiyappa Chettiar and made into a film in 1947. Then he wrote the dialogues for films like Vedala Ulagam in 1948. His directorial debut was with Oru Iravu in (1951), the dialogue for which was written by C. N. Annadurai. Two films that made him well-known are ALS productions Ambikapadi (1957) and Thirudadhe (1961). He also has directed movies in Kannada and Sinhalese Suneetha and Sujage Rahase. Neelakantan was mainly associated with creating M. G. Ramachandran's (MGR) movie persona. Between Chakravarthi Thirumagal in 1957 and Needhikku Thalaivanangu in 1976, Neelakantan directed altogether 17 of MGR's movies.

== Filmography ==
Year	Film	Credited as		Language	Notes
Year	Film	Director	Story/ Screenplay	Language	Notes
1981 6 March	Deiva Thirumanangal	✓		Tamil	(There are 3 stories) for his part, (Meenakshi Kalyanam), under this title K. V. Mahadevan, the composer
1978	Madhuraiyai Meetta Sundharapandiyan	✗	✗	Tamil	with MGR, (P. Neelakantan write only the dialogues) M. S. Viswanathan, the composer
1976	Needhikku Thalaivanangu	✓	✗	Tamil	with MGR (17/17), M. S. Viswanathan, the composer
1975	Ninaithadhai Mudippavan	✓	✗	Tamil	with MGR (16/17), M. S. Viswanathan, the composer
1974	Netru Indru Naalai	✓	✗	Tamil	with MGR (15/17), M. S. Viswanathan, the composer
1973	Ulagam Sutrum Valiban	✗	✗	Tamil	with MGR, (as consulting) M. S. Viswanathan, the composer
1972	Raman Thediya Seethai	✓	✗	Tamil	with MGR (14/17), M. S. Viswanathan, the composer
1972	Sange Muzhangu	✓	✗	Tamil	with MGR (13/17), M. S. Viswanathan, the composer
1971	Oru Thaai Makkal	✓	✗	Tamil	with MGR (12/17), M. S. Viswanathan, the composer
1971	Neerum Neruppum	✓	✗	Tamil	with MGR (11/17), M. S. Viswanathan, the composer
1971	Kumari Kottam	✓	✗	Tamil	with MGR (10/17), M. S. Viswanathan, the composer
1970	En Annan	✓	✗	Tamil	with MGR (9/17), K. V. Mahadevan, the composer
1970	Maattukara Velan	✓	✗	Tamil	with MGR (8/17), K. V. Mahadevan, the composer
1968	Kanavan	✓	✗	Tamil	25th Film with MGR (7/17), M. S. Viswanathan, the composer
1968	Kannan En Kadhalan	✓	✗	Tamil	with MGR (6/17), M. S. Viswanathan, the composer
1967	Kaavalkaaran	✓	✗	Tamil	with MGR (5/17), M. S. Viswanathan, the composer
1966 29 April	Avan Pithana?	✓	✗	Tamil	The introduction made by M. Karunanidhi R. Parthasarathi, the composer
1965 25 December	Anandhi	✓		Tamil	M. S. Viswanathan, the composer
1965 23 October	Poomalai	✓	✗	Tamil	The introduction made by M. Karunanidhi R. Sudharsanam, the composer
1964 24 December	Sujage Rahasa	✓	✗	Sinhala	T. R. Pappa, the composer
1964	Poompuhar	✓	✗	Tamil	The introduction made by M. Karunanidhi R. Sudharsanam, the composer
1963	Koduthu Vaithaval	✓	✗	Tamil	with MGR (4/17), K. V. Mahadevan, the composer
1963	Raj Mahal	✓		Tamil	
1962	Ethaiyum Thangum Ithaiyam	✓	✗	Tamil	T. R. Pappa, the composer
1961	Nallavan Vazhvan	✓	✗	Tamil	with MGR (3/17), T. R. Pappa, the composer
1961	Thirudadhe	✓	✗	Tamil	with MGR (2/17), S. M. Subbaiah Naidu, the composer
1960 1 April	Aada Vandha Deivam	✓	✗	Tamil	K. V. Mahadevan, the composer
1958 3 October	Sabaash Meena	✗	✓	Tamil	T. G. Lingappa, the composer
1958 21 August	Suneetha	✓	✗	Sinhala	T. R. Pappa, the composer
1958 16 July	Thedi Vandha Selvam	✓	✗	Tamil	also producer under his Arasu Pictures, T. G. Lingappa, the composer
1957 18 October	Ambikapathy	✓	✓	Tamil	G. Ramanathan, the composer
1957	Chakravarthi Thirumagal	✓	✗	Tamil	with MGR (1/17), G. Ramanathan, the composer
1955	Shivasharane Nambekka	✓		Kannada	T. G. Lingappa, the composer
1955 20 September	Gomathiyin Kaadhalan	✓	✓	Tamil	G. Ramanathan, the composer
1955	Modala Thedi	✓		Kannada	T. G. Lingappa, the composer
1955 12 March	Mudhal Thethi	✓	✓	Tamil	T. G. Lingappa, the composer
1954 13 April	Kalyanam Panniyum Brammachari	✓	✗	Tamil	T. G. Lingappa, the composer
1951 11 April	Or Iravu	✓	✓	Tamil	R. Sudharsanam, the composer
1949 22 December	Vazhkai	✗	✓	Tamil	with A. V. Meiyappan, as director, (he was assistant director with M. V. Raman) R. Sudharsanam, the composer
1948 11 August	Vedhala Ulagam	✗	✓	Tamil	with A. V. Meiyappan, as director, (he was assistant director with M. V. Raman) R. Sudharsanam, the composer
1947 12 January	Naam Iruvar	✗	✓	Tamil	with A. V. Meiyappan, as director. P. Neelakantan write the story and the dialogues (he was assistant director with M. V. Raman) R. Sudharsanam, the composer
