= B. R. Panthulu =

Indian cinematographer (1910 - 1974)

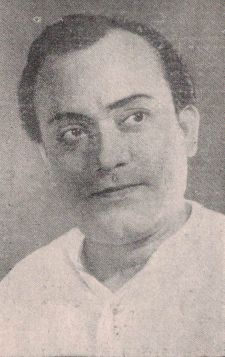
- Panthulu, pictured in 1948
- Born: Boodgur Ramakrishnaiah Panthulu; 26 July 1910; Rallabudaguru, North Arcot, Madras Presidency, British India (present-day Chittoor district, Andhra Pradesh)
- Died: 8 October 1974 (aged 64)
- Occupations: Actor, director, producer
- Spouse: B. R Kamalamma (B. R. Andalammal)
- Children: 2, including B. R. Vijayalakshmi

Budaguru Ramakrishnaiah Panthulu (26 July 1910 – 8 October 1974) was an Indian film director, producer and actor. He is best known for directing films in Tamil, Kannada, Telugu and Hindi. His most popular films are Karnan, Veerapandiya Kattabomman, Sri Krishnadevaraya, School Master and Kittur Channamma. B. R. Panthulu was a successful actor and converted Ma. Po. Si.'s biographical works Veerapandiya Kattabomman (a movie about a local chieftain who fought against the British in the 18th century in Tamil Nadu) and Kappalottiya Thamizhan (a movie about a lawyer who rebelled against the British rule that forbade Tamils operating shipping companies) to celluloid.

== Early life ==
Panthulu was born on 26 July 1910 in the village of Rallabudaguru of North Arcot in the erstwhile Madras Presidency of British India (in present-day Chittoor district of Andhra Pradesh, India) in Kannada speaking Brahmin family. He began his career as a teacher. Influenced by professional theatre during the time, he joined the troupe Chandrakala Nataka Mandali. He acted in Kannada plays Samsara Nouka, Sadarame and Guleba Kavali. He also worked for some time with Gubbi Veeranna's troupe and acted in Sri Krishna Garudi among others. Panthulu then formed his own Kannada professional theatre troupe, the Kalaseva Nataka Mandali, staging plays of his own choice.

== Career ==
He made his debut as an actor in the 1936 Kannada film Samsara Nauka, an adaptation of the play he acted in. It was produced by Devi Films, based in Chennai. Directed by H. L. N. Simha, the film starred Panthulu, M. V. Rajamma, Dikki Madhava Rao, S. K. Padmadevi and M. S. Madhava Rao. The hero marries against his grandfather's wishes and is cast out. His troubles do not end there – he finds no favour with his in-laws, loses his job, and finds himself accused of murdering the bride his grandfather had chosen for him. The film was adapted from a play by the Chadrakala Natak Mandali, and remained true to the original's reformist ideal.

In 1950, he made the Tamil film Macharekhai, partnering with filmmaker P. Pullaiah under a stage company that later came to be known as Sukumar Productions with musician T. R. Mahalingam as his partner. With writer P. Neelakantan, he started the company Padmini Pictures, and produced the Tamil film Kalyanam Panniyum Brahmachari in 1954. Under the banner, he would go on to produce the Kannada films School Master (1958), Kittur Chennamma (1961) and Sri Krishnadevaraya (1970), that went on to become landmark films. His portrayal of Timmarusu, the Prime minister of the Vijayanagara King Krishnadevaraya, won him the Karnataka State Film Award for Best Actor.

As director, Panthulu made his debut with the Kannada film Rathnagiri Rahasya (1957), a major commercial success during the time. He produced and directed a total of 57 films in all South Indian languages under the banner of Padmini Pictures.

== Filmography ==
Year	Title	Credited as			Language	Role	Notes
Year	Title	Director	Producer	Actor	Language	Role	Notes
1936	Samsara Nauka	✗	✗	✓	Kannada	Sundar	
1941	Bhaktimala	✗	✗	✓	Telugu	Mohan	
1943	Radha Ramana	✗	✗	✓	Kannada		
1944	Tahsildar	✗	✗	✓	Telugu		
1946	Lavangi	✗	✗	✓	Tamil		
1947	Nam Iruvar	✗	✗	✓	Tamil	Jayakumar	
1948	Bhaktha Jana	✗	✗	✓	Tamil	Panthoji	
1950	Macha Rekai	✗	✗	✓	Tamil		
1951	Mohana Sundaram	✗	✗	✓	Tamil		
1953	Ammalakkalu	✗	✗	✓	Telugu		
1954	Kalyanam Panniyum Brahmachari	✗	✓	✓	Tamil		first movie with Sivaji Ganesan
1954	Jaladurga	✗	✗	✓	Kannada		
1954	Karkottai	✗	✗	✓	Tamil		
1955	Modala Thedi	✗	✓	✓	Kannada	Shivram	
1955	Mudhal Thethi	✗	✓	✓	Tamil		
1955	Vadina	✗	✓	✓	Telugu		
1955	Shivasharane Nambekka	✗	✓	✓	Kannada		
1955	Doctor Savithri	✗	✗	✓	Tamil		
1956	Sivasakthi	✗	✓	✓	Tamil		
1957	Thangamalai Ragasiyam	✓	✓	✓	Tamil		
1957	Rathnagiri Rahasya	✓	✓	✓	Kannada		
1958	Sabaash Meena	✓	✓	✓	Tamil		
1958	School Master	✓	✓	✓	Kannada	Ranganna	
1958	Suhag	✓	✓	✓	Hindi		
1959	School Master	✓	✓	✓	Hindi		
1959	Abba! A Hudgi	✗	✗	✓	Kannada		
1959	Veerapandya Kattabomman	✓	✓	✓	Tamil		
1959	Veerapandya Kattabrahmana	✓	✓	✓	Telugu		
1959	Sabaash Pilla	✓	✓	✓	Telugu		
1959	Amar Shaheed	✓	✓	✓	Hindi		
1960	Pillalu Techina Challani Rajyam	✓	✓	✓	Telugu		
1960	Kuzhandhaigal Kanda Kudiyarasu	✓	✓	✓	Tamil		
1960	Makkala Rajya	✓	✓	✓	Kannada		
1960	Sangaili Thevan	✓	✓	✓	Tamil		
1961	Kittur Chennamma	✓	✓	✓	Kannada		
1961	Kappalottiya Thamizhan	✓	✓	✓	Tamil		
1961	Kaanal Neer	✗	✗	✓	Tamil	Apparao	
1962	Gaali Gopura	✓	✓	✓	Kannada		
1962	Bale Pandiya	✓	✓	✓	Tamil		
1962	Dil Tera Diwana	✓	✓	✓	Hindi		
1962	Gaali Medalu	✓	✓	✓	Telugu		
1963	Pempudu Koothuru	✓	✓	✓	Telugu		
1963	Saaku Magalu	✓	✓	✓	Kannada		
1964	School Master	✗	✓	✗	Malayalam		
1964	Chinnada Gombe	✓	✓	✓	Kannada		
1964	Karnan	✓	✓	✓	Tamil		
1964	Muradan Muthu	✓	✓	✓	Tamil		
1965	Aayirathil Oruvan	✓	✓	✓	Tamil		first movie with M.G. Ramachandran
1966	Dudde Doddappa	✓	✓	✓	Kannada	Somayya	
1966	Nadodi	✓	✓	✓	Tamil		
1966	Enga Paappa	✓	✓	✓	Tamil		25th Film
1966	Nammaveetu Lakshmi	✓	✓	✓	Tamil		
1966	Emme Thammanna	✓	✓	✓	Kannada		
1967	Gange Gowri	✓	✓	✓	Kannada		
1967	Beedi Basavanna	✓	✓	✓	Kannada		
1968	Ragasiya Police 115	✓	✓	✓	Tamil		
1968	Amma	✓	✓	✓	Kannada	Hullalli Ramaraya	
1968	Chinnari Puttanna	✓	✓	✓	Kannada		
1969	Gandondu Hennaru	✓	✓	✓	Kannada		
1970	Sri Krishnadevaraya	✓	✓	✓	Kannada	Timmarusu	
1970	Thedi Vandha Mappillai	✓	✓	✓	Tamil		Also as Thanikachalam, Shankar's father (in photo)
1971	Aliya Geleya	✓	✓	✓	Kannada		
1971	Malathi Madhava	✓	✓	✓	Kannada		
1972	Ondu Hennina Kathe	✓	✓	✓	Kannada		
1973	Ganga Gowri	✓	✓	✓	Tamil		
1973	School Master	✓	✓	✓	Tamil		
1974	Kadavul Mama	✗	✓	✓	Tamil		

== Awards ==
International Film Awards for his film "Veerapandia Kattapomman"

Award	Ceremony	Category	Nominee(s)	Outcome	Ref.
Afro-Asian Film Festival	Afro-Asian Film Festival - 1960	Best Film	B. R. Panthulu	Won	
Afro-Asian Film Festival	Afro-Asian Film Festival - 1960	Best Actor	Sivaji Ganesan	Won	
Afro-Asian Film Festival	Afro-Asian Film Festival - 1960	Best Music Director	G. Ramanathan	Won	

National Film Awards

- 1958: All India Certificate of Merit for Third Best Feature film – School Master
- 1959: Certificate of Merit for Best Feature Film in Tamil – Veerapandiya Kattabomman
- 1961: Certificate of Merit for Best Feature Film in Kannada – Kittur Chennamma
- 1961: President's silver medal for Best Feature Film in Tamil – Kappalottiya Thamizhan

Karnataka State Film Awards

- 1969-70: Karnataka State Film Award for Best Actor - Sri Krishnadevaraya

Filmfare Awards South

- 1970: Filmfare Award for Best Film – Kannada - Sri Krishnadevaraya

== Biography ==
Pathulu's biography in Kannada titled Danivillada Dhani was written by A. N. Prahlada Rao, and published in 2016 by the Karnataka Chalanachitra Academy.
