= Hatavadi =

2006 film by V. Ravichandran

- Soundtrack cover
- Directed by: Ravichandran
- Screenplay by: Ravichandran
- Story by: Ravichandran
- Produced by: Sandesh Nagaraj
- Starring: Ravichandran; Radhika
- Cinematography: G. S. V. Seetharam
- Edited by: Ravichandran
- Music by: Ravichandran
- Production company: Sandesh Combines
- Release date: 24 March 2006
- Running time: 155 minutes
- Country: India
- Language: Kannada

Hatavadi (transl. Stubborn) is a 2006 Indian Kannada- language musical drama film written and directed by V. Ravichandran. He stars in the lead role opposite Radhika. In addition to directing the film and acting, Ravichandran also took roles of the film's dialogue-writer, screenwriter, composer, lyricist and editor.

== Cast ==
- Ravichandran as Balu
- Radhika as Amisha
- Sharan
- Doddanna
- Lakshman
- K. S. L. Swamy
- Vinaya Prasad
- Padmaja Rao
- Ramesh Bhat
- Sadashiva Brahmavar
- Mandeep Roy
- Mukhyamantri Chandru
- Avinash
- Chitra Shenoy
- Bank Janardhan
- Rekha Das
- M. N. Lakshmi Devi
- Om Prakash Rao
- Damini
- B. V. Radha
- Dayanand

== Production ==
Following his 2005 film Aham Premasmi, Ravichandran announced that he would be directing Hatavadi, though the formal announcement of the film came seven months after its launch. The film was his second directorial under the banner Sandesh Combines, after Mommaga (1997).

== Soundtrack ==
Hatavadi

Soundtrack album by Ravichandran
- Released: 26 June 2006
- Genre: Feature film soundtrack
- Length: 42:18
- Label: Sri Eswari Entertainment
- Producer: Ravichandran

Ravichandran chronology
Pandu Ranga Vittala (2005)	Hatavadi (2006)	Neelakanta (2006)

Ravichandran composed the music for the soundtracks also writing its lyrics. The album consists of eight soundtracks.

Track listing
No.	Title	Lyrics	Singer(s)	Length
1.	"Aata Hudugatavo"	Ravichandran	Shankar Mahadevan	5:50
2.	"Chali Chali"	Ravichandran	S. P. Balasubrahmanyam, Chithra	4:27
3.	"Ee Preethigagi"	Ravichandran	S. P. Balasubrahmanyam	5:41
4.	"Mukhadalli Yenide"	Ravichandran	S. P. Balasubrahmanyam	4:36
5.	"Oorella Suthi"	Ravichandran	S. P. Balasubrahmanyam	5:51
6.	"Thai Thai"	Ravichandran	Udit Narayan, Malathi	4:29
7.	"Yaaru Yaaru"	Ravichandran, Chandru	Shankar Mahadevan, C. Aswath, B. Jayashree	6:37
8.	"Yaramma Ivalu"	Ravichandran	S. P. Balasubrahmanyam	4:47
Total length:				42:18

== Critical reception ==
Reviewing the film, The Hindu called Hatavadi a "surprise package of entertainment" and added, "Supported by brilliant photography by G.V.S. Sitaram, imposing shot composition, clever screenplay, sharp editing, insightful dialogues at places and simple narration, the film challenges the orthodox method of commercial film making." S. N. Deepak of Deccan Herald calls the film "a simple story of friendship, love, affection and hatred." and adds, "It is also about a man’s determination which makes him achieve what he wished despite obstacles, both societal and physical. There are not many surprises or turns. But Ravichandran has included all elements to please his fans." Writing for Rediff, R. G. Vijayasarathy gave the film a 2/5 rating and said, "[the film] has strong emotional content. The music also plays a major role in elevating the quality of the film." He concluded praising the performance of Radhika and writes, "... it is to Radhika's credit that she stands up to a superb performance. Her emotions are perfect and she is presented very well on screen."
