= Brahma Vishnu Maheshwara =

- video cover
- Directed by: Rajachandra
- Produced by: Anuradha Singh; Dushyanth Singh; Amratha Singh
- Starring: Ambareesh; Ananth Nag; V. Ravichandran; Thulasi; Kiran Juneja
- Cinematography: R. Deviprasad
- Edited by: D. Rajagopal
- Music by: Vijayanand
- Production company: Rohini Pictures
- Release date: 1 January 1988
- Running time: 133 minutes
- Country: India
- Language: Kannada

Brahma Vishnu Maheshwara is a 1988 Indian Kannada-language action drama film, written and directed by Rajachandra and produced by Rohini Pictures. The film had an ensemble cast including Ambareesh, Ananth Nag, V. Ravichandran, Thulasi, Kiran Juneja and Mahalakshmi, while many other prominent actors featured in supporting roles. The soundtrack and score composition were by Vijayanand, and the lyrics along with the dialogues were written by Chi. Udaya Shankar. The film was a remake of 1977 Tamil film Chakravarthy which was also remade in Telugu as Mugguru Mithrulu (1985) and in Hindi as Dosti Dushmani (1986).

== Cast ==
- Ananth Nag as Inspector Mahesh
- Ambareesh as Doctor Brahmendra
- V. Ravichandran as Lawyer Narayan
- Thulasi as Latha, Mahesh's wife
- Kiran Juneja as Rekha, Brahmendra's wife
- Mahalakshmi
- K. S. Ashwath as Hayavadan Rao, Brahmendra and Narayan's father
- Pandari Bai as Subhadra, Hayavadan Rao's wife
- Mukhyamantri Chandru
- Doddanna
- Lokanath
- R. N. Sudarshan as Nandhi
- Shani Mahadevappa as Bakery owner Ramanujam
- Dingri Nagaraj
- S. Narayan
- Keerthiraj

== Soundtrack ==
The music was composed by Vijayanand, with lyrics by Chi. Udaya Shankar.

Track listing
No.	Title	Lyrics	Singer(s)	Length
1.	"Endendigu Ondagi Heege"	Chi. Udaya Shankar	S. P. Balasubrahmanyam, Mano, Manohar
2.	"Rathri Vele"	Chi. Udaya Shankar	S. P. Balasubrahmanyam, S. Janaki
3.	"Chinna Naale Neenu"	Chi. Udaya Shankar	Mano, K. S. Chithra
4.	"Aaha Entha Sambhramavu"	Chi. Udaya Shankar	S. P. Balasubrahmanyam
5.	"Hudugiyu Chenna"	Chi. Udaya Shankar	S. P. Balasubrahmanyam, S. Janaki
