= Anjada Gandu =

1988 film by Renuka Sharma

- VCD cover
- Directed by: Renuka Sharma
- Screenplay by: Renuka Sharma
- Story by: Panchu Arunachalam
- Based on: Thambikku Entha Ooru
- Produced by: B. N. Gangadhar
- Starring: Ravichandran; Khushbu; Rasi aliyas Shanthi: Thoogudeepa Srinivas; Mukhyamantri Chandru; Doddanna; Devaraj
- Cinematography: Prasad Babu
- Edited by: K. Balu
- Music by: Hamsalekha
- Production company: A. N. S Productions
- Release date: 1988
- Country: India
- Language: Kannada

Anjada Gandu ( transl. Fearless man) is a 1988 Indian Kannada-language romantic comedy film produced by B N Gangadhar under the banner of ANS Productions and written and directed by Renuka Sharma. The film stars Ravichandran Khushbu Devaraj and Rasi aliyas Shanthi in the lead roles along with Thoogudeepa Srinivas, Doddanna and Mukhyamantri Chandru in supporting roles. It is a remake of the 1984 Tamil film Thambikku Entha Ooru.

The film was based on a screenplay by Renuka Sharma which was itself based on a story by Panchu Arunachalam. It was produced by B N Gangadhar under the newly established production house ANS Productions. The film was Renuka Sharma's comeback film after a hiatus of two years after the 1986 film Namma Ooru Devathe. The film also marked the second collaboration between V. Ravichandran and Khushbu after Ranadheera, which was released earlier the same year. The film's songs were composed by Hamsalekha, while the cinematography was handled by Chinni Prakash.

The film was released on 13 July 1988 to positive responses. The film had a theatrical run of 25 weeks and was declared a Blockbuster. The film's songs were chartbusters with all songs considered evergreen hits.

Anjada Gandu was the second highest grossing Kannada film of the year only surpassed by Ranadheera, another film which featured both Ravichandran and Khushbu as the lead pair. The consecutive success of Anjada Gandu and Ranadheera made the Ravichandran-Khushbu pair popular.

== Plot ==
Anand is the son of a rich businessman, Rajashekar and is given to profligate ways. He is shown spending money wantonly in a club. He has concern for the poor people. He is shown breaking the window of a car when its owner does not pay a coconut vendor. He also thrashes a gang of unruly men in an upscale club when one of them mistreats the waiter. His catchphrase in this phase is shown to be "piece, piece" or alternatively "ella, piece piece" describing the state in which the target of his anger is left.

His father is naturally angry with such behavior and feels that a spell in a village with his old school friend, Rudrappa, who has since been in the army will do the boy good. And therefore sends him off to a village, Tavarekere with an introductory letter which does not reveal that he is his son but only says that he is in need of some guidance for a year and that he should be taught some daily chores.

Gopala and Bhujangaraya are businessmen who are trying to acquire land in the same village. Gopala and Bhujanga want to build a Suger factory in that Village so the ask Villagers Houses was perfect for their Factory so ask them to sold their Land for Best Price but Rudrappa and Anand disapproved their proposal. Gopala Stars Vengeance against Rudrappa and Anand.

Bhujangaraya's daughter Asha is arrogant due to her wealth. Anand and Asha fights starts in a Local Village Touring Talkies when Asha stops the Film in the middle Anand teases Asha. So Asha sent goons to beat him, But Anand thrashes them all and act as rape her, Asha appolizes for her work but later she challenges him to come and touch her in her House. Next Day Anand enters Asha house thrashes all Asha Goons and Gopala's son Vinod. Then enters her Room and Kiss her Lips.

Next Day Rudrappa tie him on tree and ask Asha to beat Anand with Hunter but Asha leaves her room.

After that incident Anand and Asha falls for each other. One day Asha Proposes to Anand, Anand accepts her they start loving each other.

One day Gopala sends Snakes to Rudrappa's House to kill them all. But Ananda Cathes all Snakes throw back to Bhujanga House. Warns him about stay away from their Land.

Gopala tied Bhujanga and Arranges Asha and Vinod Marriage. Anand along with his friends disguise as Priest and Musicians and marry Asha, Anand and His friends beats all Gopala's goons and handover them to Police.

Finally Rudrappa and Anand's Father reveals about Anand real Identity Anand and Asha take a Blessings from their Parents. In the end both couples shown holding a Baby and Living Happily.

== Cast ==
- Ravichandran as Anand
- Khushbu as Asha
- Thoogudeepa Srinivas as Major Rudrappa
- Doddanna as Gopala
- Mukhyamantri Chandru as Ranganath
- Devaraj as Sundar
- Rasi alias Shanthi as mangala
- Umashree as Mani
- Srinivasa Murthy as Rajashekhar
- Mysore Lokesh as Village Film Theatre Owner
- Aravind as Vinod
- Ashok Badaradinni as PA Sampangi
- Killer Venkatesh
- Bank Suresh
- Narasimha Moorthi
- Govindu
- Bullet Nagaraj
- Master Manjunath

== Soundtrack ==
Hamsalekha composed the music for the film and the soundtracks, with the lyrics for the soundtracks penned by R. N. Jayagopal, V. Manohar and Hamsalekha. The album has seven soundtracks.

Two songs from this movie were later re-used by Hamsalekha in two different Telugu movies. The song Aakaradalli Gulabi Rangide was later adapted by Hamasalekha in the Telugu film Muthyamantha Muddu (1989) as Premalekha Raasa. Another song Eke Heegaytho was later reused in the 1997 Telugu movie Omkaram which was a remake of 1995 Kannada movie Om as Om Brahmanda which comes in the place of Hey Dinakara retaining only the opening Sanskrit verse from Om but following the tune of the song Eke Heegayto from this movie.

Track listing
No.	Title	Lyrics	Singer(s)	Length
1.	"Preethiyalli Iro Sukha"	R. N. Jayagopal	S. P. Balasubrahmanyam, Manjula Gururaj	4:40
2.	"Eke Heegaytho"	R. N. Jayagopal	S. P. Balasubrahmanyam, B. R. Chaya	4:34
3.	"Aakaradalli Gulabi Rangide"	V. Manohar	Latha Hamsalekha	4:35
4.	"Mooru Kaasina Kudure"	Hamsalekha	Ramesh	4:43
5.	"Dumdum Dol"	Hamsalekha	S. P. Balasubrahmanyam, B. R. Chaya	4:35
6.	"Modala Baari"	R. N. Jayagopal	S. P. Balasubrahmanyam, Manjula Gururaj	4:47
7.	"Neeli Baanali"	R. N. Jayagopal	B. R. Chaya	1:22
Total length:				29:16

== Legacy ==
The movie was a huge success and elevated the career of the actor Ravichandran who had earlier given a fresh hit through Premaloka. Moreover, the success of the movie and Ranadheera released in the same year made Ravichandran and Khushbu a star pair. 2014 Kannada movie had its title inspired by this movie.
