= Padikkadavan =

Padikkadavan (lit. 'Uneducated') may refer to:

- Padikkadavan (1985 film), an Indian Tamil film starring Sivaji Ganesan and Rajinikanth
- Padikkadavan (2009 film), an Indian Tamil film starring Dhanush
