= O Nanna Nalle =

- DVD cover
- Directed by: V. Ravichandran
- Written by: V. Ravichandran
- Screenplay by: V. Ravichandran
- Story by: Ezhil
- Based on: Thullatha Manamum Thullum (Tamil)
- Produced by: Mansur Ahamad; V. Kuppuswamy; R. B. Choudary; Paras Jain
- Starring: V. Ravichandran; Isha Koppikar; Srinivasa Murthy; Sadhu Kokila
- Cinematography: G. S. V. Seetharam
- Edited by: Shyam Yadav
- Music by: V. Ravichandran
- Production company: Super Good Combines
- Release date: 9 November 2000
- Country: India
- Language: Kannada

O Nanna Nalle (transl. Oh, my lover) is a 2000 Indian Kannada-language film directed by V. Ravichandran and starring V. Ravichandran himself and Isha Koppikar. The film is a remake of the Tamil film Thullatha Manamum Thullum (1999), which itself is based on the Hollywood film City Lights (1931).

== Cast ==
- V. Ravichandran as Raja
- Isha Koppikar as Ranganayaki (Rangu)
- Srinivasa Murthy
- Sadhu Kokila
- Bullet Prakash
- Myna Chandru
- Mandeep Roy
- Bank Suresh
- Bank Janardhan
- Vijay Kashi
- Raj Surya
- Mandya Ramesh
- Karibasavaiah
- Tanuja
- Chithra Shenoy
- Kishori Ballal
- Venkatesh Sharma
- Michael Madhu
- Vaijanath Biradar
- Ponnambalam
- Suneetha Shetty

== Production ==
The film marked the foray of R. B. Choudary, one of the producers of the film, in Kannada cinema. The film's launch and inaugural shot was shot at bus stand of Gnanabharathi campus of Bangalore University. The film was shot at a specially made college and road set behind Raja Mills in Bengaluru that cost 40 lakh rupees.

== Soundtrack ==
O Nanna Nalle

Soundtrack album by Ravichandran
- Released: 2000
- Genre: Feature film soundtrack
- Length: 28:48
- Language: Kannada
- Label: Akash Audio

Ravichandran chronology
Preethsu Thappenilla (2000)	O Nanna Nalle (2000)	Ekangi (2002)

Video Jukebox
- O Nanna Nalle – Jukebox on YouTube

Soundtrack was composed by Ravichandran. The song "Innisai Paadi Varum" from the original Tamil film was retained in this version as "Kanasugarana".

All lyrics are written by Ravichandran.

Track listing
No.	Title	Singer(s)	Length
1.	"Kanasugarana Ondu Kanasu Kelamma" (Male)	S. P. Balasubrahmanyam	4:42
2.	"Kanasugarana Ondu Kanasu Kelamma" (Female)	K. S. Chitra	4:43
3.	"Ee Preethige Kannu Illa"	S. P. Balasubrahmanyam, Suma Shastry	5:08
4.	"Rangu Rangena Halli"	S. P. Balasubramanyam, K. S. Chitra	4:51
5.	"O Nanna Nalle"	S. P. Balasubrahmanyam	5:04
6.	"Dudde Doddappa"	L. N. Shastri	4:20
Total length:			28:48

== Reception ==
A critic from Sify wrote that "The film is a one-man show for Ravichandran, who is the writer, director, music director and hero of the film. Replete with sentimental and melodramatic scenes coupled with heart-twisting sacrifices, Oh Nanna Nalle is surely going to catch the fancy of female audience. The heroine Isha Koppikar is no patch on Simran who did both the Tamil and Telugu versions. For Kannada audience Oh Nanna Nalle is a good family entertainer but don’t forget to take a couple of hankies".
