= Malla (film) =

2004 Kannada film

- Poster
- Directed by: Ravichandran
- Written by: Ravichandran; Mohan Shankar (dialogue)
- Produced by: Ramu
- Starring: Ravichandran; Priyanka Upendra; Mohan Shankar; Umashree
- Narrated by: Vishnuvardhan
- Cinematography: G. S. V. Seetharam
- Edited by: M. Sanjeeva Reddy
- Music by: Ravichandran
- Production company: Ramu Enterprises
- Release date: 27 February 2004
- Running time: 147 minutes
- Country: India
- Language: Kannada

Malla is a 2004 Indian Kannada-language film written and directed by Ravichandran. He also stars in the film, appearing in dual role, while also scoring music for the film. It also stars Priyanka Trivedi and Mohan Shankar. The film was produced by Ramu for his home banner Ramu Enterprises making his the first team up with Ravichandran.

Malla found a widespread release across Karnataka state on 27 February 2004 and was declared a blockbuster at the box office. The film is also reportedly the first to introduce the famous Kerala-based traditional art Kalarippayattu in Kannada cinema. The stunt master K. D. Venkatesh was awarded in a special category at the 2003–04 Karnataka State Film Awards.

== Plot ==
The film is all about Malla - a florist, a Samaritan, soft-natured person beloved by people; contrast to this is his son Shiva who grows-up in goons' abode; a father who sacrifices his life for his son and at the end son taking revenge on the culprits.

== Cast ==
- Ravichandran as Mallikarjuna (Malla) / Shiva (dual role)
- Priyanka Upendra as Priya
- Mohan Shankar as Hanuma
- Umashree
- Pavitra Lokesh
- K. S. L. Swamy
- K. D. Venkatesh
- Fayaz Khan
- Ultimate Shivu
- Vijay Kashi
- Shankar Ashwath
- Lakshman Rao
- Venkatesh Prasad
- Tejashree as dancer in song "Masthu Nee Masthu"

== Production ==
V. Ravichandran began working on Malla in March 2003, alongside Pandu Ranga Vittala, another film he was acting in. Malla was produced by Ramu, under his production house, while Ravichandran directed it. He stated: "The audience can expect to see the earlier Ravichandran in Malla. The film will have all gimmicks and heroisms of a Ravichandran-starrer and I want the cine-goers to take something back home after seeing the film. The film will touch the hearts of all the cine-goers. It will entertain, make people laugh and cry." He added that he would star as the eponymous lead Mallikarjuna "Malla", who has a love for flowers. He further said the film would have six tracks, and that Priyanka Upendra would star opposite him, as a girl "who comes from abroad and becomes a village girl." Ravichandran wrote the film's story and lyrics for three tracks, and co-wrote the screenplay with J. K. Bharavi, while actor Mohan Shankar wrote the dialogues.

== Soundtrack ==
The music of the film was composed and lyrics written by Ravichandran.

Malla

Soundtrack album by Ravichandran
- Released: 2004
- Genre: Feature film soundtrack
- Label: Jhankar Music

All lyrics are written by Ravichandran.

No.	Title	Singer(s)	Length
1.	"Yammo Yammo"	Srinivas, Anuradha Sriram
2.	"Karunaade"	L. N. Shastry
3.	"Ee Preethiya Marethu"	S. P. Balasubrahmanyam, K. S. Chithra
4.	"Masthu Nee Masthu"	Hemanth
5.	"Olagirodhu"	Udit Narayan, Suma Shastry
6.	"Mangalyam"	L. N. Shastry, Suma Shastry
7.	"Bangadi"	Mano, K. S. Chithra
8.	"Angada Angada"	L. N. Shastry, Suma Shastry

== Critical reception ==
Chitraloka wrote "The dream merchant of Kannada cinema Ravichandran's highly expected cinema 'Malla' is a splendid package. The first half is 'romantic special' the second half is 'action special'. Instead of such a lengthy 'Kannadi fight' (also partly Kerala martial arts) it could have been brought out in a different brainy style. Had this modification done the expenditure, time and audience head ache could have been avoided to some extent. Ravichandran applies two tricky ideas in ending two of the four brothers. A little bit of exercise to give an intelligent touch to finish was needed. Other wise the film is a technical treat. The standard set by Ravichandran is in no way less when compared to Hindi films". Sify called it an "entertainer". Deccan Herald wrote "Cameraman Seetharam gives visual treat throughout the film which sometimes makes it a 'flowery treat' too. Ravichandran has composed music and action scenes have been picturised well". Viggy wrote "He [Ravichandran] is back to track now with his typical brand movie 'Malla' - an outright Crazy Star film. Malla has nothing new as a plot but Ravichandran shines as a technician by filling tasty, spicy and aromatic wine in old bottle with sparks of humor. He carries the film completely on his shoulder not just on the screen, even behind as a director with music, story, screenplay and dialogues without compromising in any of these departments!".
