= Pralayanthaka =

- Directed by: B. Subba Rao
- Written by: Nethaji
- Produced by: N. Veeraswamy; V. Ravichandran
- Starring: V. Ravichandran; Bhavya; Jai Jagadish; Rajeev; Vijayakashi
- Cinematography: R. Madhusudan
- Edited by: N. Chandran
- Music by: Shankar–Ganesh
- Production company: Sri Eshwari Productions
- Release date: 26 December 1984
- Country: India
- Language: Kannada

Pralayanthaka is a 1984 Indian Kannada-language film, directed by B. Subba Rao and produced by N. Veeraswamy. The film stars V. Ravichandran, Bhavya, Jai Jagadish, Rajeev and Vijay Kashi. The film has musical score by Shankar–Ganesh. The film was a remake of Tamil film Theerpu En Kaiyil.

== Cast ==
- V. Ravichandran
- Bhavya
- Ambika in Special Appearance
- Arjun Sarja (Cameo)
- Jai Jagadish
- Rajeev
- Vijay Kashi
- Kanchana
- Vedaprada
- Mukhyamantri Chandru
- Lokanath
- Shakti Prasad
- Rajanand
- N. S. Rao
- M. S. Umesh
- Lakshman
- Dingri Nagaraj
- Gode Lakshminarayana
- Thyagaraj Urs
- Master Chethan

== Soundtrack ==
The music was composed by Shankar–Ganesh. The song "Munde Nee Hodaga" was reused from composers's own song "Ennadi Muniyamma" which they had composed for Tamil film Vaanga Mappillai Vaanga.

No.	Song	Singers	Lyrics	Length (m:ss)
1	"Munde Nee Hodaga"	Manjula	Chi. Udaya Shankar	
2	"Yeno Hosa Ullasa"	S. P. Balasubrahmanyam	Chi. Udaya Shankar	
3	"Munde Nee Hodaga"	S. P. Balasubrahmanyam	Chi. Udaya Shankar	
4	"Ratribandare Yenu"	S. Janaki, S. P. Balasubrahmanyam	Chi. Udaya Shankar	
5	"Naale Manege"	S. P. Balasubrahmanyam	Chi. Udaya Shankar	
6	"Naale Baruve"	Malaysia Vasudevan	Chi. Udaya Shankar	

== Marketing ==
Cutouts for the film were placed at certain petrol bunks.
