= Chinna (1994 film) =

- VCD cover
- Directed by: V. Ravichandran
- Written by: V. Ravichandran
- Screenplay by: V. Ravichandran
- Produced by: V. Ravichandran
- Starring: Ravichandran; Yamuna; Puneet Issar
- Cinematography: G.S.V. Seetharam
- Edited by: K. Balu
- Music by: Hamsalekha
- Production company: Eeshwari Productions
- Release date: April 16, 1994
- Running time: 135 minutes
- Country: India
- Language: Kannada

Chinna is a 1994 Indian Kannada-language action film produced, written, directed and enacted by V. Ravichandran. The cast includes Yamuna, Puneet Issar, Mukhyamantri Chandru, Lokanath, and Pandari Bai. Ravichandran plays the role of a cop happily settled with his wife, and suddenly becomes aware of the existence of his ancestral property in the middle of a forest occupied by the local goons. This is the only Kannada film of Sabu Cyril. The music was composed by Hamsalekha and was declared a musical hit upon release.

== Cast ==
- Ravichandran as Chinna
- Yamuna
- Puneet Issar as Vishwa
- Silk Smitha
- Pandari Bai
- Lokanath
- Umashree
- Mukhyamantri Chandru
- Sundar Krishna Urs
- B. V. Radha
- Ramesh Bhat
- Lohithaswa as Chief Minister
- Master Anand
- Ponnambalam
- Karikalan Vasanth as Forest Bandit Rayappa
- Sathyajith as Jailor
- H.M.T. Nandha as Beggar
- Rathnakar
- Master Deepak
- Bharath Kumar
- Bank Suresh
- Rocket Vikram
- Stunt Devu
- Guru Murthy
- Fayaz Khan

== Soundtrack ==
All music composed and all songs written by Hamsalekha.

Title	Singer(s)
"Chinna Chinna"	S. P. Balasubrahmanyam
"Huli Banthu"	S. P. Balasubrahmanyam, K. S. Chithra
"Nannavalu Nannavalu"	S. P. Balasubrahmanyam, K. S. Chithra
"Nannavanu Nannavanu"	K. S. Chithra
"Nanna Daari Bere"	S. P. Balasubrahmanyam, K. S. Chithra
"Welcome Welcome"	S. P. Balasubrahmanyam, Sujatha
"Aunty Bandlu Aunty"	S. P. Balasubrahmanyam, Manjula Gururaj
"Nannavalu Nannavalu" (sad)	S. P. Balasubrahmanyam

== Reception ==
The music, composed by Hamsalekha was well received and the audio sales hit a record high.
