= Sipayi =

- Music album picture
- Directed by: Ravichandran
- Written by: Ravichandran; B. Suresha (Dialogue)
- Screenplay by: Ravichandran
- Produced by: Ravichandran
- Starring: Ravichandran; Chiranjeevi; Soundarya
- Cinematography: G. S. V. Seetharam
- Edited by: K Balu
- Music by: Hamsalekha
- Production company: Eshwari Pictures
- Release date: 1 February 1996
- Running time: 139 minutes
- Country: India
- Language: Kannada

Sipayi is a 1996 Kannada-language action film, directed and produced by V. Ravichandran. The film stars Ravichandran and Soundarya in lead roles with Chiranjeevi appearing in an important role. Music and lyrics were composed by Hamsalekha. The movie was later dubbed in Telugu as Major, and released on 5 December 1998. It was also dubbed in Tamil.

== Plot ==
Shanti is a bubbly, young village girl who loves rain but is afraid of thunder and lightning. She wants to live a life of freedom. Sipayi (Shivu) loves Shanti since childhood. Shanti's parents too want their daughter to marry Sipayi. Shanti's father Baaji Bettayya is renowned in and around the village for never losing a single sheep fight. One day, the village head's son Vicky sees Shanti and lusts after her. He devices a plan and invites Bettayya for a sheep fight. Bettayya keeps winning all the matches. In order to win, Vicky's friends inject a drug to Bettayya's sheep in order to weaken its strength. This time they put Shanti at stake. Bettayya intoxicated with consecutive victories, agrees without asking anybody. He loses this match. Hand tied by his own words, Bettayya agrees to get Shanti married to Vicky. The wedding procedures begin to take place. Sipayi who gets to know this, enters the wedding venue, stops Shanti's wedding with Vicky. Instead he himself marries Shanti. Chandru, a friend of Sipayi and a soldier, helps Sipayi in his marriage. On the wedding night it is revealed that Shanti never loved Sipayi, that she always wanted to live freely without any barriers. She expresses how uncomfortable and terrified she used to be in his company. She clearly states that he married her without any consent and that she is not ready to live with him. Will their relationship sustain? How will Sipayi prove his love for Shanti forms the rest of the story.

== Cast ==
- Ravichandran as Sipayi (Shiva)
- Chiranjeevi as Major Chandrakanth
- Soundarya as Shanti
- Vinaya Prasad
- Ramakrishna
- Tara
- Umashri
- Ramesh Bhat
- Balaraj as Different Viji
- Mukhyamantri Chandru as Baaji Bettayya
- Sanketh Kashi
- Doddanna
- Bank Janardhan
- Srinivasa Murthy
- Vijay Kashi
- Ashalatha

== Production ==
The song "Rukkamma" was shot in Sakleshpur. The film was also shot at Mekedatu.

== Soundtrack ==
Hamsalekha has composed the music and lyrics for the film.

#	Title	Singer(s)	Length
1	"Hey Rukkamma"	S. P. Balasubrahmanyam	5:18
2	"O Megha Rajane"	S. Janaki	5:06
3	"Snehakke Sneha"	S. P. Balasubrahmanyam	4:54
4	"Bangaarada Bombe"	K. J. Yesudas, K. S. Chitra	4:46
5	"Yaarige Beku Ee Lokha"	K. J. Yesudas	4:36
6	"Yaarele Ninna Mechidavanu"	S. Janaki, Mano	4:07
7	"Kokko Koliye"	S. P. Balasubrahmanyam	4:23
8	"Chittegale"	Mano	4:27
9	"Karago Chandira"	L. N. Shastri	0:43
10	"Odo Chandira"	L. N. Shastri	0:51
11	"Vanditha Kiranaa"	L. N. Shastri	1:18

== Accolades ==
At the 1995-96 Karnataka State Film Awards, the movie won Awards for:

- Best Editor
- Best Sound Recording
- Best Art Direction
