= Ravi Bopanna =

2022 Kannada-language film

- Official poster
- Directed by: Ravichandran
- Written by: Ravichandran
- Story by: Shahi Kabir
- Based on: Joseph (Malayalam)
- Produced by: Ravichandran; Ajeeth
- Starring: Ravichandran; Radhika Kumaraswamy; Kavya Shetty
- Edited by: Ravichandran
- Music by: Ravichandran
- Release date: 12 August 2022
- Country: India
- Language: Kannada

Ravi Bopanna is a 2022 Indian Kannada-language film directed by Ravichandran and stars himself in the title role. He also produced the film, composed the music, and edited the film. The film is a remake of 2018 Malayalam film Joseph.

== Cast ==
- Ravichandran as Ravi Bopanna
- Radhika Kumaraswamy as Radhika
- Kavya Shetty as Spoorthy
- Mohan
- Ramakrishna
- Jai Jagadish
- Ravishankar Gowda
- Sudeepa as Advocate Vidyuth Verma (cameo appearance)

== Reception ==
A critic from Deccan Herald wrote that "‘Ravi Bopanna’ confuses the audiences as they can't make out if they should understand Ravichandra's philosophies or enjoy the film. Ravichandra and other artistes are impressive so is the cinematography". A critic from The Times of India said that "The movie is strictly for Ravichandran fans". A critic from Bangalore Mirror said that "Ravichandran’s fans will enjoy this flick as he is the hero as well as the villain and also as crazy as they love him to be. A critic from OTT Play said that "While the film’s tone, pacing, or treatment are nowhere close to the original, the Crazy Star elements might help them wade through the lackluster writing and execution".
