= Naanu Nanna Hendthiru =

- VCD cover
- Directed by: V. S. Reddy
- Written by: K. Nanjunda (dialogues)
- Story by: K. Bhagyaraj
- Based on: Thaikulame Thaikulame (1995)
- Produced by: Rockline Venkatesh
- Starring: Ravichandran; Soundarya; Prema
- Cinematography: G. S. V. Seetharam
- Edited by: Shyam
- Music by: Ravichandran
- Production company: Rockline Productions
- Release date: 30 April 1999
- Running time: 166 minutes
- Country: India
- Language: Kannada

Naanu Nanna Hendthiru (English: Me and my wives) is a 1999 Indian Kannada language comedy drama film directed by V. S. Reddy and produced by Rockline Venkatesh. The film stars Ravichandran along with Soundarya and Prema among others. Ravichandran has scored the music for the film.

The film was a remake of Tamil film Thaikulame Thaikulame. The film was a box office success.

== Cast ==
- Ravichandran as Sriram
- Soundarya as Seetha
- Prema as Manisha (Voice by Sunethra Pandit)
- Doddanna as Sriram's father
- Mandya Ramesh
- Srinivasa Murthy
- Kashi as Kashi
- Bank Janardhan
- Jyothi
- Shobha Raghavendra

== Production ==
In February 1999, shooting for the film began. The first schedule took place in Bangalore and the second schedule was shot in Thailand for twenty days in March 1999. A scene with Ravichandran and the lead actresses was shot on a set at Kanteerva Studios.

== Soundtrack ==
The music was composed by V. Ravichandran in his debut as a film composer and lyrics for the soundtrack were penned by K. Kalyan.

Track listing
No.	Title	Singer(s)	Length
1.	"Baare Chinna"	S. P. Balasubrahmanyam, K. S. Chithra
2.	"Nannavalu Nakkare"	S. P. Balasubrahmanyam, K. S. Chithra
3.	"Naanu Nanna Hendthiru"	S. P. Balasubrahmanyam, K. S. Chithra
4.	"Ready 123"	Gurukiran, L. N. Shastry
5.	"Ee Bhumige"	L. N. Shastry, K. S. Chithra, Suma Shastry
6.	"Ee Jagave Namadu"	L. N. Shastry, K. S. Chithra

== Reception ==
A critic from The Hindu wrote "ROCKLINE PRODUCTION’S yet another re- make, Naanu Nanna Hendtheeru has all the trappings such as exotic foreign locales, a surfeit of songs and dances, and a story full of drama that are so identifiable with its earlier productions. But the only impression the film leaves behind is that of the beautiful snow covered expanse of the Himalayas and that of colourful Malaysia, a far-fetched story, with its retrograde ideas on women and an inexpressive Ravichandran being the major cause for the film falling fiat". Deccan Herald's Srikanth Srinivasa opined that "Ravichandran has improved his acting performance from his earlier films, he definitely needs to invest more time on improving his acting faculties rather on making a foray into music direction." He praised the performances of the rest of the actors, while adding that it seemed that the film was "ghost directed by Ravichandran," and that "[m]usic is defintely a casualty without Hamsalekha".
