= Halli Meshtru =

1992 film by Mohan-Manju

- VCD cover
- Directed by: Mohan-Manju
- Written by: Hamsalekha (Dialogues)
- Screenplay by: Mohan - Manju
- Story by: K. Bhagyaraj
- Based on: Mundhanai Mudichu (1983) by K. Bhagyaraj
- Produced by: N. Veeraswamy
- Starring: Ravichandran; Bindiya, Janardhana VenkataramanaAachari Babu(Chinthamani)
- Cinematography: Prathap
- Edited by: K. Balu
- Music by: Hamsalekha
- Production company: Sri Eshwari Productions
- Distributed by: R. F. Productions
- Release date: 17 March 1992
- Running time: 147 minutes
- Country: India
- Language: Kannada

Halli Meshtru (transl. Village Teacher) is a 1992 Kannada-language romantic comedy film directed by Mohan-Manju. The film starred Ravichandran, Bindiya and Tara in key roles with Balakrishna, Thoogudeepa Srinivas and Silk Smitha playing supporting roles. It is a remake of 1983 Tamil film Mundhanai Mudichu. The music of the film was composed by Hamsalekha.

== Cast ==
- Ravichandran as Meshtru
- Bindiya as Parimala
- Tara as first wife of Meshtru
- Janardhana Venkataramana Aachari Babu (Chinthamani) as Kappe Raaya
- Balakrishna as Panditre
- Thoogudeepa Srinivas as chairman, Parimala father
- Silk Smitha
- Girija Lokesh as Parimala Mother
- Gayatri Prabhakar
- Rathnakar
- Ajay Raj

== Soundtrack ==
Hamsalekha composed the film's soundtrack and wrote the lyrics.

Song	Singer(s)	Duration
"Kaayi Kaayi Nugge Kaayi"	S.P. Balasubrahmanyam, S. Janaki	4:56
"Sankranthi Bantu"	S.P. Balasubrahmanyam], S. Janaki	4:27
"Preeti Maadu Tappenilla"	K.J. Yesudas, S. Janaki	4:58
"Ilkal Seere Utkondu"	K.J. Yesudas	5:00
"Akka Nin Ganda"	S. Janaki, chorus	4:43
"Halli Meshtre Halli Meshtre"	S.P. Balasubrahmanyam, S. Janaki	4:26
