= Gopi Krishna (film) =

Gopikrishna
- Directed by: V. Ravichandran
- Written by: P. Vasu
- Based on: Professor (1962)
- Produced by: N. Veeraswamy
- Starring: Ravichandran; Rupini; Lokesh
- Cinematography: G S V Seetharam
- Edited by: K. Balu
- Music by: Hamsalekha
- Production company: Eshwari Productions
- Release date: 1992
- Running time: 129 minutes
- Country: India
- Language: Kannada

Gopi Krishna (Kannada: ಗೋಪಿ ಕೃಷ್ಣ) is a 1992 Indian Kannada-language romantic comedy film directed and enacted by Ravichandran in the lead role along with Rupini, Sumithra and Lokesh. Though the film was a remake of 1962 Hindi film Professor, the story is credited to P.Vasu who directed the Tamil remake Nadigan (1990).

Music and lyrics were composed by Hamsalekha. The film was produced by N. Veeraswamy for his home banner Eshwari Productions.

== Cast ==
- Ravichandran as Gopikrishna/Muddukrishna
- Rupini as Geetha
- Jyothi as Seetha
- Sumithra
- Lokesh as Kothi Kodanda
- Avinash as Avinash
- Mukhyamantri Chandru as musician
- Mandeep Roy
- Girija Lokesh
- Rekha Das as Maid servant and the mother of Avinash
- Ananthrao Maccheri
- Baby Sanathani

== Track list ==
#	Title	Singer(s)	Lyrics
1	"Oho Vasantha"	K. J. Yesudas; S. Janaki	Hamsalekha
2	"Nayakara O Nayaka"	Mano; K. S. Chithra	Hamsalekha
3	"Jagavella Jagavella"	Mano, S. Janaki	Hamsalekha
4	"En Uduge Idu"	Mano, S. Janaki, Latha Hamsalekha	Hamsalekha
5	"Sharadammanavare"	Mano, K. S. Chithra; Latha Hamsalekha	Hamsalekha
6	"Chori Chori"	Mano, K. S. Chithra	Hamsalekha
7	"Oho Vasantha" (Solo Unreleased)	K. J. Yesudas	Hamsalekha
8	"Jagavella Jagavella" (Solo Unreleased)	S. Janaki	Hamsalekha
