= Naanu Nanna Hendthi =

- DVD cover
- Directed by: D. Rajendra Babu
- Screenplay by: D. Rajendra Babu, Hamsalekha
- Story by: K. S. Satyanarayana
- Produced by: N. Veeraswamy; V. Ravichandran
- Starring: V. Ravichandran; Urvashi
- Cinematography: R. Madhusudhan
- Edited by: K. Balu
- Music by: Shankar–Ganesh
- Production company: Sri Eshwari Productions
- Release date: 7 November 1985
- Running time: 138 minutes
- Country: India
- Language: Kannada

Naanu Nanna Hendthi (transl. Me and my wife) is a 1985 Kannada-language romantic drama film directed by D. Rajendra Babu and written by K. S. Satyanarayan. The film stars V. Ravichandran, Urvashi and Leelavathi. The core plot of the film was loosely based on the 1981 Telugu film Nenu Maa Aavida. The soundtrack and score composition was by Shankar–Ganesh and the film was produced by N. Veeraswamy. D. Rajendra Babu made his Bollywood debut in 1987, with the remake version of this movie, titled as Pyaar Karke Dekho. The song Akkipete Lakkamma was retained in the Hindi version as Haki Petai Lakamma- both sung by S. P. Balasubrahmanyam. The film was also remade in Tamil as Kanna Thorakkanum Saami. The film was a box office success.

== Plot ==
The musician comes to town to find a job in Akashwani. After the job, he finds it hard to find a home for a bachelor. He tells a lie that he is a married man. To tell the truth to the house owner who keeps pestering him to show photo of his wife, he gets a random photo of a girl from a photo studio. But that girl comes in real to his home and starts acting as his real wife. The story revolves around his fight and difficulty removing her.

== Cast ==
- V. Ravichandran as Ravi
- Urvashi as Urvashi
- Leelavathi as Leelavathamma
- Mukhyamantri Chandru as Urvashi's Father
- N. S. Rao as N. S. Rao
- Umashree as N. S. Rao's Wife
- Krishne Gowda as Director of Akashavani
- B. K. Shankar
- Anuradha

== Soundtrack ==
The music was composed by Shankar–Ganesh, with lyrics by Hamsalekha. All the songs were received extremely well. The songs "Karunada Thayi", "Yaare Neenu Roja" and "Yaare Neenu Cheluve" found widespread appreciation upon release. The song "Karunada Thayi" was set in the Carnatic raga Abheri (known as Bhimpalasi in Hindustani music). The song "Yaare Neenu Roja" was remixed in the film Saheba (2017) starring V. Ravichandran's son Manoranjan.

Track listing
No.	Title	Lyrics	Singer(s)	Length
1.	"Yaare Neenu Roja Hoove"	Hamsalekha	S. P. Balasubrahmanyam	6:19
2.	"Karunada Thayi"	Hamsalekha	S. P. Balasubrahmanyam	4:47
3.	"Yaare Neenu Cheluve"	Hamsalekha	K. J. Yesudas	4:45
4.	"Akkipete Lakkamma"	Hamsalekha	S. P. Balasubrahmanyam, Vani Jairam	4:43
5.	"Rathri Aytu Malagona"	Hamsalekha	Ramesh, Vani Jairam	4:23
Total length:				24:57
