= Apoorva (2016 film) =

- Music VCD Cover
- Directed by: V. Ravichandran
- Written by: V. Ravichandran
- Produced by: V. Ravichandran
- Starring: V. Ravichandran; Apoorva
- Cinematography: G. S. V. Seetharam
- Edited by: V. Ravichandran
- Music by: V. Ravichandran
- Production company: Sri Eshwari Productions
- Release date: May 27, 2016
- Country: India
- Language: Kannada

Apoorva is a 2016 Indian Kannada-language romantic drama film written, produced and directed by Ravichandran who also composed the music. The movie stars V Ravichandran and Mysore-based actress Apoorva. The film will see Vijay Raghavendra and his wife playing the role of Ravichandaran's son and daughter-in-law. Actor Sudeepa has also done a special role in the movie. The crux of the film is a love story which takes place between a 61-year-old man and 19-year-old girl. The film was declared a flop at the box office.

== Plot ==
Rajshekhar (Ravichandran) is a 61-year-old painter who, through circumstance, is married to his manager's daughter. They have a son, but their marriage is unconventional. For 40 years, Rajshekhar has regularly visited a mall to paint. One day, his bag is used by a terrorist gang led by Sudeepa to smuggle weapons into the mall for a planned attack. The film presents the incident indirectly, with the audience hearing what happens from inside an elevator in which Rajshekhar and Apoorva (Apoorva) are trapped.

By the end of their ordeal in the elevator, Apoorva falls in love with Rajshekhar. He subsequently announces his love for her to his family and goes to meet Apoorva, a television anchor. There, he discovers that she already has a boyfriend, and she refuses to accept Rajshekhar as her lover.

== Cast ==
- V. Ravichandran as Rajashekar
- Apoorva as Apoorva
- Vijay Raghavendra as Vijay Raghavendra, Rajashekar's son
- Pavitra Lokesh as Rajashekar's wife
- Sudeepa as a terrorist (guest appearance; also voiceover)
- P. Ravi Shankar as a terrorist (guest appearance; also voiceover)
- Prakash Raj as Rajki (photo presence; also voiceover)
- Spandana Vijay Raghavendra as Vijay Raghavendra's wife (guest appearance)
- Tara (voiceover)
- Sadhu Kokila (voiceover)
- Rangayana Raghu (voiceover)

== Production ==
Most of the film is shot in a lift at Ravichandran's residence who altered it just to shoot for the Movie. Ravichandran expects this movie to be better than Premaloka. The movie contains quotes about love such as "Death, a reason to love. Love, a reason to die", "The world does not matter to the person who has fallen in love", etc.

== Soundtrack ==
Apoorva

Soundtrack album by Ravichandran
- Released: 14 February 2015
- Genre: Feature film soundtrack
- Length: 41:14
- Language: Kannada
- Label: Lahari Music

The audio rights of the film was bought by Lahari Music for ₹72 lakh, a record deal in Kannada film industry. The deal was finalised on 1 January 2015.

The audio of the film was released on Valentine's Day. The audio launch was exclusively telecast on Udaya TV and featured top stars of Kannada industry. Prior to the launch, Ravichandran revealed, "Each song from Apoorva will be launched by celebrities including Shivarajkumar, Ramesh Aravind, Upendra, Darshan, Puneeth Rajkumar, Ganesh and Yash. Sudeep has already worked in the film and will host the launch with me," and added, "I want everybody to enjoy Valentine’s Day with us and make it a special day of love. Everyone should get ready for this special musical treat and Valentine date with Apoorva."

All lyrics are written by V. Ravichandran.

No.	Title	Singer(s)	Length
1.	"Nishabdave"	Goutham Srivathsa	4:31
2.	"Sorry Sorry"	Goutham Srivathsa	2:31
3.	"Prapanchavu Kaanadu"	Goutham Srivathsa	4:41
4.	"Ee Oldu Manigu"	Goutham Srivathsa	3:19
5.	"Omme Ommomme"	Goutham Srivathsa	3:19
6.	"Life Is Beyond You"	Goutham Srivathsa, Anuradha Bhat	3:38
7.	"Bye Bye Apoorva"	Goutham Srivathsa	3:27
8.	"Nenneyu Nodalilla"	Goutham Srivathsa	3:54
9.	"Prapanchavu Kaanadu (Duet version)"	Goutham Srivathsa, Shwetha	4:42
10.	"Omme Ommomme - Unplugged Version"	Goutham Srivathsa, Anuradha Bhat	3:16
11.	"Prapanchavu Kaanadu - Unplugged Version"	V. Ravichandra, Apoorva, Others	3:56
Total length:			41:14

== Reception ==
The film received negative reviews from critics.

Sunayana Suresh of The Times of India rated the film two out of five stars and wrote, "The film has the trademark Ravichandaran touch, when it comes to showcasing the new girl Apoorva. But, it does not give the same old romance that he is famous for. Instead, here's mature wine, with also talks philosophy." Shyam Prasad S of Bangalore Mirror gave the film one-and-a-half out of five stars and opined that "a small but good story buried under the glamorous garbage. The story is worthy of a 30-minute short film and, if you manage to sit through the almost two-and-a-half hours of Apoorva, it is a cumbersome task to distill the story out." Shashiprasad SM of Deccan Chronicle gave the film a negative review and wrote that "The actress Apoorva is not what we all have been seeing in Ravichandran's film and the other disheartening fact is that the debutant can hardly act."
