= Mommaga =

- Directed by: V. Ravichandran
- Story by: R. Selvaraj
- Produced by: Sandesh Nagaraj
- Starring: V. Ravichandran; Meena; Umashri; Prakash Rai
- Cinematography: G. S. V. Seetharam
- Edited by: Shyam
- Music by: Hamsalekha
- Production company: Sandesh Combines
- Release date: 24 October 1997
- Running time: 139 minutes
- Country: India
- Language: Kannada

Mommaga (English: Grandson) is a 1997 Indian Kannada language romantic drama film directed by V. Ravichandran and produced by Sandesh Nagaraj. Besides Ravichandran, the film stars Meena and Umashri in the leading roles. The songs of the movie composed and written by Hamsalekha were received well.

== Cast ==
- V. Ravichandran as Soorappa "Soori"
- Meena
- Prakash Rai
- Umashri
- C. R. Simha
- Master Anand
- Ashalatha
- Ramesh Bhat
- Vijay Kashi
- Lakshman
- M. D. Kaushik
- Shanthamma

== Soundtrack ==
The music was composed and lyrics were written by Hamsalekha. A total of 10 tracks have been composed for the film.

Track listing
No.	Title	Lyrics	Singer(s)	Length
1.	"Dolu Dolu Nanna"	Hamsalekha	S. P. Balasubrahmanyam, K. S. Chithra
2.	"Kere Eri Myale"	Hamsalekha	S. P. Balasubrahmanyam, K. S. Chithra
3.	"Hey Gumlakkadi"	Hamsalekha	S. P. Balasubrahmanyam, K. S. Chithra
4.	"Maharaja Rajashri"	Hamsalekha	S. P. Balasubrahmanyam
5.	"Ammanigagi Karna Sotha"	Hamsalekha	S. P. Balasubrahmanyam
6.	"Baaro Anna Baaro Thamma"	Hamsalekha	S. P. Balasubrahmanyam
7.	"Sri Ranganu Kanmuchi"	Hamsalekha	Rajesh Krishnan, K. S. Chithra
8.	"Oo Hoogale"	Hamsalekha	Rajesh Krishnan, K. S. Chithra
9.	"Akka Thangi Ibbaru"	Hamsalekha	K. S. Chithra
10.	"Huttutha Ondu Kombu"	Hamsalekha	L. N. Shastry
