= Chora Chittha Chora =

- Video cover
- Directed by: Subrahmanyam
- Written by: K. Raghavendra Rao
- Produced by: Sa. Ra. Govindu
- Starring: V. Ravichandran; Namrata Shirodkar; Malavika; Srinivasa Murthy
- Cinematography: G. S. V. Seetharam
- Edited by: Shyam
- Music by: V. Ravichandran
- Production company: Thanu Chitra
- Release date: 24 December 1999
- Running time: 132 minutes
- Country: India
- Language: Kannada

Chora Chittha Chora is a 1999 Indian Kannada language romance drama film directed by Subramanya and produced by Sa. Ra. Govindu. The film stars V. Ravichandran, Namrata Shirodkar and Malavika. This was Shirodkar's first and only Kannada film.

The film was a remake of Telugu film Allari Priyudu (1993) which was inspired by the 1991 Hindi movie Saajan which in turn was inspired by the play Cyrano de Bergerac. The music was composed by Ravichandran to the lyrics of K. Kalyan. The movie was later dubbed in Hindi as Chura Liya Hai Tumne Jo Dil Ko.

== Plot ==
A man falls in love with a woman after their friendship blossoms through letters. However, he is unaware that her adoptive sister is the one writing them.

== Cast ==
- V. Ravichandran as Raja
- Namrata Shirodkar as Kavitha
- Malavika as Lalitha
- Srinivasa Murthy
- Umashri
- Kashi
- Balaraj
- Sumithra
- Tennis Krishna
- Mandya Ramesh
- Bank Janardhan
- Shivaram
- Sarigama Viji
- Mimicry Dayanand

== Soundtrack ==
The music was composed by V. Ravichandran and lyrics were written by K. Kalyan and Shree Chandru. A total of 8 tracks have been composed for the film and the audio rights brought by Jhankar Music.

Track listing
No.	Title	Lyrics	Singer(s)	Length
1.	"Hey Dosth Helo Dosth"	K. Kalyan	Badri Prasad, L. N. Shastry, Ravishankar Gowda
2.	"Malle Sooji Malle"	K. Kalyan	S. P. Balasubrahmanyam, K. S. Chithra
3.	"O Igo Illondu Manaside"	K. Kalyan	K. J. Yesudas, K. S. Chithra
4.	"Cheluvamma Chandamama"	Shree Chandru	S. P. Balasubrahmanyam
5.	"Cheluvamma Premadamma"	Shree Chandru	L. N. Shastry
6.	"Kachaguliya Kannavane"	Shree Chandru	S. P. Balasubrahmanyam, K. S. Chithra
7.	"Dillu Dillu Seridaga"	Shree Chandru	S. P. Balasubrahmanyam, K. S. Chithra
8.	"Hello Hello"	Shree Chandru	S. P. Balasubrahmanyam, K. S. Chithra

== Reception ==
Deccan Herald wrote "A triangular love trite with regular doses of pranks, love, letters, disappointment and sacrifice, Chora Chitta Chora, the latest Ravichandran-starrer offers nothing new except for fresh faces and eye-catching picturesque locales".
