= Kula Gourava =

- VCD cover
- Directed by: Peketi Sivaram
- Screenplay by: Peketi Sivaram
- Story by: G. Balasubramanyam
- Produced by: N. Veeraswamy
- Starring: Rajkumar; Bharathi; Jayanthi
- Cinematography: P. S. Prakash
- Edited by: P. Bhaktavatsalam
- Music by: T. G. Lingappa
- Production company: Sri Eswari Productions
- Release date: 1971
- Running time: 164 minutes
- Country: India
- Language: Kannada

Kula Gourava ( transl. Honour of clan) is a 1971 Indian Kannada language romantic drama film directed by Peketi Sivaram and written by G. Balasubramanyam. It stars Rajkumar in triple roles along with Jayanthi and Bharathi. The film was produced under Sri Eswari Productions of N. Veeraswamy. It had a very successful soundtrack composed by T. G. Lingappa. Popular actor-director V. Ravichandran, son of the film producer Veerasamy, appeared in the film as a child artist. The film received 5 awards at the 1970-71 Karnataka State Film Awards including the best film, best actor, and best editor categories. Veeraswamy, who till then used to finance movies under Sri Eswari Productions, turned an independent producer with this movie. However, contrary to expectations, the movie failed to achieve a 100-day theatrical run.

This was Rajkumar's first movie in which he played a triple role. It is also his only black and white movie where he played a triple role. The movie was remade in Telugu in 1972 as Kula Gowravam starring N. T. Rama Rao and Aarathi with Jayanthi reprising her role. It was also remade in Tamil in 1974 as Kula Gowravam starring R. Muthuraman and Jayasudha with Jayanthi reprising her role.

== Cast ==
- Rajkumar as Raghunatha Rao/ Ravi (Chandrashekharaiah)/ Shankar
- Jayanthi as Kala
- Bharathi as Radha
- Narasimharaju as Gopu
- Balakrishna as Raghunatha Rao's personal secretary
- Sampath as Thimme Gowda
- R. Nagendra Rao as Kala's grandfather (cameo)
- M. N. Lakshmi Devi as Meenakshi
- B. Jaya as Parvati
- V. Ravichandran as young Shankar (credited as Master Ravichandran)
- Mahadevappa
- Ramamurthy
- Indira Jorge

== Soundtrack ==
The music of the film was composed by T. G. Lingappa and lyrics for the soundtrack written by Chi. Udaya Shankar, R. N. Jayagopal and Vijaya Narasimha.

Track list

| # | Title | Singer(s) |
|---|---|---|
| 1 | "Ondu Maathu Ondu Maathu" | P. B. Sreenivas, P. Susheela |
| 2 | "Naa Haadabeke" | P. B. Sreenivas |
| 3 | "Ye Hudugi Ye Bedagi" | P. B. Sreenivas, P. Susheela |
| 4 | "Yaare Bandavanu" | P. Susheela |
| 5 | "Raga Ninnadhu Bhaava Nannadu" | P. Susheela |
| 6 | "Naavikanaaro" | P. Nageshwara Rao |

== Awards ==
- Karnataka State Film Awards – 1970–71
1. Best Third Film
2. Best Actor – Rajkumar
3. Best Dialogue – Chi. Udaya Shankar
4. Best Editing – P. Bhaktavatsalam
5. Best Sound recording – Srinivas

== See also ==
- Kannada films of 1971
