= Ekangi =

- Directed by: Ravichandran
- Written by: Ravichandran
- Produced by: Ravichandran
- Starring: Ravichandran; Ramya Krishna; Prakash Rai
- Cinematography: G. S. V. Seetharam
- Edited by: Shyam Yadav
- Music by: Ravichandran
- Production company: Eshwari Enterprises
- Release date: 21 March 2002
- Running time: 150 minutes
- Country: India
- Language: Kannada

Ekangi is a 2002 Indian Kannada-language film written, directed by and starring Ravichandran. He also wrote film's screenplay and composed the music. The film stars Ramya Krishna and Prakash Raj, with Vanitha Vasu, K. S. Sridhar, Ramesh Bhat and Sadhu Kokila in supporting roles. With the film, Ravichandran's reputation as an experimenter grew, having erected a house of ₹80 lakh (equivalent to ₹3.2 crore or US$330,000 in 2023) exclusively for the film and spending heavily in filming song sequences, an unusual trend in Kannada cinema during the time. It was also the first in Kannada and second Indian film to employ SFX sound system.

The film received warm reviews from film critics and won five awards at the 2001–02 Karnataka State Film Awards including the award for Second Best Film and Best Actor (Ravichandran). It was an ambitious project, but failed to succeed at the box-office, even though following the audience's hostile response after its theatrical release, almost 20 scenes were re-shot and re-edited before re-releasing it with censor acceptance. Ravichandran was said to have suffered a loss of ₹2 crore (equivalent to ₹8.0 crore or US$830,000 in 2023) owing to the film's commercial failure.

== Plot ==
Raja(V Ravichandran) lives happy life with his father's principles. Once he visit bar and meets Shilpa (Ramya Krishna) and falls love with her. His life gets trouble when he invite her to his house.

== Cast ==
- Ravichandran as Ravi / Raja
- Ramya Krishna as Shilpa
- Prakash Rai as Prakash Roy
- Vanitha Vasu as Raja's mother
- K.S. Sridhar
- Soori
- Master Vinay
- M. N. Suresh
- Prakash
- Ramesh Bhat as traffic inspector
- Sadhu Kokila as thief
- Bullet Prakash as thief
- Mandya Ramesh
- Master Santhosh

== Production ==
For the film, a multi-storeyed glass house was built just for the film at a cost of ₹ 80 lakh by art director Ashok, it was an unusual experiment by the director and producer Ravichandran at the time, considering that a similar house was erected even for Ravichandran's previous film O Nanna Nalle. The set which consists of "huge hall, a bar, a table tennis room, two bedrooms and others" was built at Kanteerava Studios by 100 workers within 40 days. Close to 80% of the film's scenes were filmed in the house. EFX sound system was employed in the film for the first time in Kannada cinema and second overall.

== Soundtrack ==
Ekangi

Soundtrack album by Ravichandran
- Released: 2001
- Genre: Feature film soundtrack
- Length: 48:21
- Label: Jhankar Music

Ravichandran chronology
O Nanna Nalle (2002)	Ekangi (2001)	Kodandarama (2002)

Ravichandran composed the film's background score, soundtracks and also wrote the lyrics for the tracks. The album consists of nine soundtracks. The album was released on 28 October 2001, at Jilla playground in Davangere, at an event. The event was also shown live in Udaya TV.

Track listing
No.	Title	Lyrics	Singer(s)	Length
1.	"Banna Bannada Loka"	Ravichandran	Shankar Mahadevan	5:08
2.	"Ee Chitte Thara Banna"	Ravichandran	L. N. Shastry	5:54
3.	"Hudugi Superamma"	Ravichandran	Suresh Peters, Anupama, Rajesh Krishnan	4:54
4.	"Nannane Kele Nanna Pranave"	Ravichandran	Hariharan	5:50
5.	"Nee Madid Thappa"	Ravichandran	Rajesh Krishnan	11:18
6.	"Nee Yekangiyagamma"	Ravichandran	Madhu Balakrishnan	4:40
7.	"Once Upon a Time"	Ravichandran	Sonu Nigam	4:15
8.	"Ondu Nimisha"	Ravichandran	S. P. Balasubrahmanyam, Anuradha Sriram	4:47
9.	"Ekangi Theme"	Ravichandran	Instrumental	1:35
Total length:				48:21

=== Critical reception ===
The album was received well by critics upon release. But, for the lyrics, the album received appreciation. Amritamati S. of The Music Magazine reviewed the album and called it, "Symphonic grandeur on dumb lyrics". She added writing credits to the solo violin, guitar bits and the piano play among other highlights of the album. She concluded writing, "The quality of recording is excellent. Full marks to the string ensemble, and to the other instrumentalists. But you will be disappointed if you look for poetry, or even the street-smart variety of verse that Hamsalekha specialises in."

== Release and reception ==
Following the film's first theatrical release and a hostile response from the audience, close to 20 scenes of the film were re-shot and re-edit before giving it a re-release, a first of its kind in Kannada cinema. Sify wrote "The problem with Yekangi is its wafer thin storyline and the film turns out to be dragging". Indiainfo wrote "For the first time our lavish and creative director cum producer cum actor has voiced his own conflicts. In a different way drawn a line between imaginary and real world. With a tight script Ravi has done a fabulous job".

== Awards ==
Karnataka State Film Awards 2001-02

- Best Film - V. Ravichandran
- Best Actor – V. Ravichandran
- Best Music Director – V. Ravichandran
- Best Sound Recording – L. Sathish
- Karnataka State Film Award for Best Male Playback Singer – Rajesh Krishnan for "Nee Madid Thappa"

== Impact ==
Having suffered from huge losses after the film failed commercially, Ravichandran took the blame for the film's failure. In an interview with Deccan Herald in December 2004, speaking of the film's failure, he said "it shattered him mentally and physically." The failure of the film influenced him hugely and his style of filmmaking.
