= Chakravyuha (1983 film) =

- Poster
- Directed by: V. Somashekhar
- Written by: M. D. Sundar
- Produced by: N. Veeraswamy; V. Ravichandran
- Starring: Ambareesh; Ambika; Vajramuni
- Cinematography: R. Chittibabu
- Edited by: Yadav Victor
- Music by: Shankar–Ganesh
- Production company: Sri Eswari Productions
- Release date: 1983
- Running time: 146 min
- Country: India
- Language: Kannada

Chakravyuha ( lit. 'Labyrinth') is a 1983 Kannada-language political action thriller film directed by V. Somashekhar. The film stars Ambareesh and Ambika. This film marked the entry of popular actor Mukhyamantri Chandru into films. Produced by N. Veeraswamy for Eshwari Productions, this film also starred his son V. Ravichandran in a small role. Actor Tiger Prabhakar also featured in an extended cameo role. The film obtained an 'A' certificate without cuts from the CBFC.

Upon release, It met with highly positive reviews and catapulted Ambareesh's career to greater heights and coined him with the title as "Rebel Star" for his angry-young man role. The film's huge success inspired other language industries and was subsequently remade in Hindi as Inquilaab (1984) and in Telugu as Mukhyamantri (1984) starring Krishna with Ambika reprising her role.

== Plot ==
Amarnath aka Amar is an educated-young man, who has not received any qualified job as all positions force him to compromise his morals. A new politician, Shankarappa promises an end to corruption, but gets disrespected by the crowd, who pelt stones at him. Amar rescues him and Shankarappa is impressed and trains Amar to be a cop. Amar completes his IPS exam where he is posted as an ACP and serves the state honestly. Amar meets Asha, who is the only daughter of multi-millionaire businessman, Seetharam. The two fall for each other, and their relationship is accepted by Seetharam, after Shankarappa's insistence. Amar discovers a crime network that includes Shankarappa as well as Seetharam and is made as a pawn in the syndicate's crimes.

Amar is blackmailed into collaborating with them as they show him a pic where Amar is giving a briefcase to Seetharam's partner, where he reveals that the partner is actually an international smuggler named Koya-Koya Hatachi aka Richard Louis. Amar is assigned to retrieve diamonds from Richard Louis and also save him from the police by Seetharam. With no choice, Amar does the job, but kills Richard Louis and gets immensely popular with the public. Inspector Pratap, who is Amar's colleague issues a warrant to search Amar's house by the orders from the commissioner Lakshman Rao. Prathap knows that Amar has retrieved the diamonds from Richard Louis, but he is unable to find the diamonds because Amar hides the diamonds inside the first-aid bandages.

Asha misunderstands Amar to be corrupt and leaves him, along with their new-born child. Heartbroken at the separation, Amar resigns from the police force. Amar files for a nomination in the elections at Shankarappa's insistence and becomes the CM with the network's support as they form the government with their syndicate members. During the cabinet meeting, Amar smuggles out a machine gun and reveals his intentions to massacre everyone for the country's welfare. Amar kills all of them, including Seetharam and Shankarappa. Asha learns about Seetharam's misdeeds and the blackmail. Asha reconciles with Amar. Amar surrenders to the police for his crimes and is arrested; the crowd walks back to the police vehicle and demands that Amar should be released.

== Cast ==
- Ambareesh as Amarnath
- Ambika as Asha, Amarnath's wife (voice dubbed by B. Jayashree)
- V. Ravichandran as Khoya Khoya Hatachi alias Richard Louis (special appearance)
- Tiger Prabhakar as Anil Raj (extended cameo)
- Mukhyamantri Chandru as Shankarappa
- Vajramuni as Bhupathi
- Thoogudeepa Srinivas as Seetharam, Asha's father
- Shakti Prasad as Police Commissioner Lakshman Rao
- Krishne Gowda as Victor Jayaraj
- Lakshman as Inspector Prathap
- P. Munikrishnappa
- Somu
- Raghavachar
- B. K. Shankar
- A. S. Murthy
- G. R. Bheema Rao
- Tiptur Siddharamayya
- Comedian Guggu
- Kannada Raju
- Shanthamma
- Prashanthi Nayak

== Soundtrack ==
The music was composed by Shankar–Ganesh, with lyrics for all songs written by Chi. Udaya Shankar. All the songs composed for the film were received extremely well, especially "Chali Chali" and the title song are considered as evergreen songs. The song "Nija Heluvenu Amma" was adapted from "Toothpaste Irukku", which was composed by the duo for the Tamil film Ranga. The song "Chali Chali" was adapted from the song "Suno Suno Meri Ye Kahani Suno" from Bappi Lahiri's 1982 album Superuna.

Track listing
| No. | Title | Singer(s) | Length |
|---|---|---|---|
| 1. | "Chakravyuha Idu Chakravyuha" | S. P. Balasubrahmanyam |
| 2. | "Chali Chali Thalenu" | S. P. Balasubrahmanyam, S. Janaki |
| 3. | "Baa Bande" | S. P. Balasubrahmanyam, S. Janaki |
| 4. | "Nija Heluvenu Amma" | P. Susheela, S. Janaki |
| 5. | "Rita Rosy Julie" | S. P. Balasubrahmanyam |
