= Ranadheera =

- Promotional poster
- Directed by: V. Ravichandran
- Screenplay by: V. Ravichandran
- Story by: Subhash Ghai
- Produced by: N. Veeraswamy
- Starring: Ravichandran; Khushbu; Anant Nag
- Cinematography: R. Madhusudan
- Edited by: K. Balu
- Music by: Hamsalekha
- Production company: Eshwari Studios
- Release date: 1988
- Running time: 146 minutes
- Country: India
- Language: Kannada

Ranadheera is a 1988 Indian Kannada-language musical romantic action film directed by V. Ravichandran and produced by N. Veeraswamy under Eshwari Productions. The film, an adaptation of 1983 Hindi film Hero, stars Ravichandran and Khushbu, alongside Anant Nag, Lokesh, Sudheer and Jai Jagadish. The music was composed by Hamsalekha, while cinematography and editing were handled by R. Madhusudan and K. Balu respectively.

Ranadheera was the highest-grossing Kannada film of 1988 and Khushbu also gained popularity in Karnataka through this film. Amitabh Bachchan was the chief guest at the event held to mark the film's 25 week run at the box office.

== Plot ==
Ranadheera, one of the henchmen of a crime boss, Basha, kidnaps Radha, the daughter of retired IG Jagannath, as Jagannath is the witness to the crimes committed by Basha. Radha earlier assumed that Ranadheera is a police officer, but later learns the truth. Radha and Ranadheera soon fall for each other, where Ranadheera, transformed by true love, surrenders to the police and gets imprisoned for two years.

Radha returns home, where she tells her brother Inspector Anand about Ranadheera. To prevent Radha from marrying someone else, Anand calls his friend Jimmy to pretend that Radha and Jimmy love each other. Jimmy misunderstands the situation and falls in love with Radha. Ranadheera gets released from prison and starts working in a garage in order to reform himself. Despite this, Jagannath kicks Ranadheera out of his life and decides to get Radha married to Jimmy.

However, Anand finds out that Jimmy is a drug smuggler and informs Jagannath, who cancels the marriage. Basha escapes from prison, he and Jimmy sets out to exact revenge against Jagannath and Ranadheera. They kidnap Radha, Jagannath and Ranadheera's friends and bring them to their ship. Ranadheera and a disguised Anand arrive to rescue them; Ranadheera kills Jimmy and Pasha. In the aftermath, Jagannath lets Radha reunite with Ranadheera.

== Cast ==
- V. Ravichandran as Ranadheera/Murali
- Khushbu Sundar as Radha
- Anant Nag as Inspector Anand, Radha's brother
- Lokesh as IG Jagannath, Radha's father
- Jai Jagadish as Jimmy
- Jayachitra as Shanti, Anand's wife
- Umashree as Yamuna Bai
- K. Vijaya as Kausalya, Radha's mother
- Sudheer as Basha
- Jaggesh as Maadhu
- Mukhyamantri Chandru as Rajaram
- Doddanna as a lawyer
- Aravind as Sanju
- Killer Venkatesh as Rizzu
- C. P. Yogeeshwara as Gangu
- H. M. T. Nanda as Paddu
- Master Manjunath
- Shani Mahadevappa

== Production ==
The film was set and shot around Chikmagalur. The filming was also held at Ambuthirtha.

== Soundtrack ==
The music was composed by Hamsalekha, who also wrote their lyrics. The album consists of ten soundtracks and was popular among the youths.

Track listing
| No. | Title | Artist(s) | Length |
|---|---|---|---|
| 1. | "Baa Baaro Baaro Ranadheera" | S. P. Balasubrahmanyam, S. Janaki | 1:32 |
| 2. | "Preethi Maadabaaradu" | S. P. Balasubrahmanyam, S. Janaki | 6:15 |
| 3. | "Ondaanondu Kaaladalli" | P. Susheela, Ramesh | 4:36 |
| 4. | "Meenakshi Ninna Kanna Mele" | S. P. Balasubrahmanyam | 3:36 |
| 5. | "Yaare Neenu Sundara Cheluve" | S. P. Balasubrahmanyam, S. Janaki | 6:12 |
| 6. | "En Hudgiro Adyaaking Aadtiro" | Master Manjunath, S. P. Balasubrahmanyam, Vani Jayaram | 4:47 |
| 7. | "Naavindu Haado Haadige kone illa" | S. P. Balasubrahmanyam, S. Janaki | 4:52 |
| 8. | "Flute (Music Bit)" | - | 1:26 |
| 9. | "Baa Baaro (Bit)" | mano | 7:04 |
| 10. | "Baaramma (Bit)" | Chorus, Vani Jairam | 1:15 |
| 11. | "Ee Preethige (Bit)" | Vani Jairam | 00:30 |
| Total length: | | | 41:35 |
