= Intlo Illalu Vantintlo Priyuralu =

1996 Telugu film directed by E. V. V. Satyanarayana

- Theatrical release poster
- Directed by: E. V. V. Satyanarayana
- Screenplay by: E. V. V. Satyanarayana; Esukapalli Mohana Rao (dialogues)
- Based on: Thaikulame Thaikulame (1995) by N. Murugesh
- Produced by: K. L. Narayana
- Starring: Venkatesh; Soundarya; Vineetha
- Cinematography: S. Gopal Reddy
- Edited by: K. Ravindra Babu
- Music by: Koti
- Production company: Sri Durga Arts
- Release date: 22 May 1996
- Running time: 147 minutes
- Country: India
- Language: Telugu

Intlo Illalu Vantintlo Priyuralu (transl. Wife at home, Lover in the kitchen) is a 1996 Indian Telugu-language comedy drama film directed by E. V. V. Satyanarayana and produced by K. L. Narayana under the Sri Durga Arts banner. It stars Venkatesh, Soundarya and Vineetha (in her Telugu debut) with music composed by Koti. The film was successful at the box office. The film was a remake of Tamil film Thaikulame Thaikulame.

== Plot ==
Being childless haunts Sriram and Sita, a couple with trustworthy characters. After Sriram's desperate father pursues him and Sita to visit a doctor to help them conceive a child, they reluctantly visit Dr. Amaram. Sriram perceives that Sita cannot have childless but lies to the latter and his father that he has shortcomings rather. Eventually, Sriram's father discovers the truth and asks him to marry for a second time. To escape temporarily, Sriram decides to marry once he returns after his business trip from Nepal to which Sriram's father agrees and the whole scenario is kept hidden from Sita. In Nepal, Sriram comes across Manisha and due to the mistake of his friend Giri, Sriram ends up marrying her.

After learning that Sriram is married, Manisha becomes sad but comes to terms with it and lies to the monks of her religion that she left her husband and he has no fault. As per traditions, Manisha is to be punished by shaving her head and she had to leave the rest of her life as a widow while Sriram is asked to leave the place. However, he learns about Manisha's impending punishment, regrets it, and realizes that she truly loves him. He accepts her and returns to India in hope of telling his father, the truth but to his surprise, Sriram's father changes his mind as he realized that no one could fulfill the role of daughter-in-law as Sita has been doing and they hide the truth. After three months, Sriram learns that Manisha is pregnant with his child and brings her to India to stay in Giri's house. She gives birth to a boy but Sriram and Manisha mutually decide to lie that the boy is an orphan so that he could be adopted by Sriram and Sita and raised with all the riches.

After Sita adopts Manisha's son, Manisha leaves the place in sorrow without informing Sriram. As the infant becomes a child, Sriram's father learns of Manisha and brings her to India. He pursues Sriram to give her a good life and live together happily with Sita and Manisha but Sriram is skeptical. Due to a series of events, Manisha ends up being employed as a maid in Sita and Sriram's home and Sita assumes that Manisha's husband eloped. Envying Manisha's growing closeness to Sriram, his father, and the child, Sita decides to get her married off but Sriram chases the groom out of the house during a formal meeting and the truth comes out. Though Giri explains the situation, Sita feels deceived and repeatedly accuses Sriram and Manisha. Enraged, Sriram's father reveals that Sriram has no shortcomings and she is infertile instead and also reveals that the child is Manisha's son, whom she sacrificed for Sita. Sita realizes her mistake and stops Manisha from leaving the house, who reluctantly accepts after her son addresses her as a mother. Giri and Sriram's father happily welcomes the trio home.

== Cast ==
- Venkatesh as Sriram
- Soundarya as Sita, Sriram's wife
- Vineetha as Manisha, Sriram's second wife
- Brahmanandam as Giri, Sriram's friend
- Kota Srinivasa Rao as Sriram's father
- Mallikarjuna Rao as Eerinayudu, Telugu worker in Nepal
- Babu Mohan as Manager of Sriram's company branch in Nepal
- AVS as Dr. Amaram, Giri's brother-in-law and Sriram and Sita's doctor
- Ananth as Amaram's compounder
- Master Nag Anvesh as Manisha and Sriram's son

== Soundtrack ==
Intlo Illalu Vantintlo Priyuralu

Soundtrack album by Koti
- Released: 1996
- Genre: Soundtrack
- Length: 27:12
- Label: Supreme Audio
- Producer: Koti

Koti chronology
Jagadeka Veerudu (1996)	Intlo Illalu Vantintlo Priyuralu (1996)	Naidugari Kutumbam (1996)

Music composed by Koti. Lyrics written by Samavedham Shanmuka Sharma. Music released on Supreme Music.

No.	Title	Singer(s)	Length
1.	"Paaparo Pop"	Mano, Sangeethaa-Sangeetha Sajith.	4:39
2.	"Bol Bol Bolu Raja"	S. P. Balasubrahmanyam, Sujatha	4:46
3.	"Priyurale Premaga"	S. P. Balasubrahmanyam, Chitra	5:28
4.	"O Lammi Timmirekkinde"	Mano	3:42
5.	"Chilakatho Majaa"	S. P. Balasubrahmanyam, Chitra	4:34
6.	"Ammane Ayyanura"	Chitra	5:23
Total length:			31:53

== Reception ==
A critic from Andhra Today wrote that "A couple of good songs and good camera work make the movie worth watching".
