= Ramachaari =

1991 film by D. Rajendra Babu

- DVD cover
- Directed by: D. Rajendra Babu
- Story by: P Vasu
- Based on: Chinna Thambi (Tamil)
- Produced by: N. Veeraswamy
- Starring: Ravichandran; Malashri; Lokesh
- Cinematography: D. Prasad Babu
- Edited by: K. Balu
- Music by: Hamsalekha
- Production company: Sri Eshwari Productions
- Release date: 19 July 1991
- Running time: 147 minutes
- Country: India
- Language: Kannada

Ramachaari is a 1991 Indian Kannada-language film directed by D. Rajendra Babu and produced by N. Veeraswamy. It starred Ravichandran and Malashri. The music was composed by Hamsalekha. The film, a remake of Tamil film Chinna Thambi (1991) directed by P. Vasu was a success at the box office.

== Plot ==
The movie starts with the birth of a baby girl, Nandini, in an agriculture land owner's family. Her three elder brothers throw a feast in honour of her. The young son of the local singer (who had died) is brought in to sing for the event. The three brothers raise Nandini like their own child as their parents had died. At the age of five, an astrologer predicts that Nandini will bring much happiness to the family, but she will marry a person of her choice and not of her brothers' choosing. This angers the brothers, and to prevent this from happening, they raise Nandhini within the confines of the house. She is homeschooled, and when she does go out, all the men are warned to hide from Nandini and that seeing her will be met with dire consequences.

Nandini soon reaches puberty. The few males allowed around her are the service staff and her bodyguards. Meanwhile, the boy who sang, Ramachari, grows up to be a naïve and gullible simpleton with a heart of gold. He is raised by his widowed mother Lakshmi. He does not go to school and spends his time singing and entertaining the people of the village.

One day the bodyguards get into a fight with Ramachari, who defeats them. Impressed with Ramachari's naivete and fighting skills, the brothers hire Ramachari to be Nandini's bodyguard and butler. Nandini meanwhile starts to resent her lack of freedom. She coerces Ramachari to show her the village without her brothers' knowledge. Ramachari complies with her wishes and shows her the village, which results in Nandini falling ill. Ramacahri is blamed for Nandini getting sick and is beaten up by the brothers. Nandini, who has just started to like Ramachari, feels guilty for being the reason for him getting thrashed. She shares her medicine with Ramachari, who inadvertently equates Nandini to his mother, as being the few people who truly care for him. This incident brings them closer together emotionally.

One day, a factory worker is punished for leering at Nandini. He plots to kill her at the inauguration of the new factory owned by her brothers. Ramachari overhears the plot, and in a desperate attempt to save Nandini, lunges at her and inadvertently feels her up in public. Nandini does not mind and defends Ramachari by arguing that he would not do something like that in public without good reason. But her brothers are enraged and beat Ramachari to the point that they almost kill him. Nandini stops them and gives him a chance to explain. When Ramachari explains the situation, they hang their heads in shame. Ramachari quits his job on the spot, despite Nandini's silent apology. That night, Nandini decides to meet Ramachari and apologise and perhaps convince him to come back to the job. Ramachari refuses to come back as he does not want to put up with the violent nature of her brothers. She thinks if Ramachari marries her, they will not be able to manhandle Ramachai. She convinces Ramachari to tie a mangalsutra around her neck, which will protect him from her brothers. Ramachari, without realising the sanctity of the act, does as told and does not realise that he is now married to her.

Ramachari comes back to work and is given a higher level of respect by the brothers for saving Nandini's life. Nandini too starts emulating her sisters-in-law in taking care of her husband. This makes Ramachari nervous, but he still remains clueless. Her change in behaviour is noticed by her sisters-in-law, who urge the brothers to get Nandini married off before she brings shame to the family. Nandini, realising that they are trying to get her married off, tries to make Ramachari understand that they are already married. Ramachari refuses to understand and runs away to his mother, who upon learning what has happened, pulls him out of denial. She sends him away in an attempt to protect him.

The brothers come to know what has happened and torture Lakshmi to get her to reveal where her son is hiding. She is saved in time by her son, who almost kills the brothers. The wives of the brothers stop him from killing them and ask him to save Nandini, who has now resorted to self-destruction upon hearing the torturous acts of her brothers. Ramachari rushes back to save his wife and revives her with his singing. Nandini runs towards him, and the movie ends with them embracing, with her brothers finally supporting their relationship.

== Cast ==
- V. Ravichandran as Ramachaari
- Malashri as Nandini
- Lokesh
- Sumithra as Lakshmi
- Prakash Rai
- Girija Lokesh as Sarsa
- Mysore Lokesh as Mukkanna
- Jyothi as Sharada
- Manjumalini as Tripurasundari
- Sathyabhama as Tripurasundari's mother
- Master Manjunath as young Ramachari
- Master Sunil
- Doddanna as an astrologer (Guest Appearance)

== Production ==
The film started after Ravichandran's dream project Shanti Kranti experienced a financial crisis. Khushboo, an actress in Shanti Kranti and the heroine in Ranadheera, Anjada Gandu and Yugapurusha, offered assistance. She eventually convinced the producer of Chinna Thambi to become Ramachaari's producer. She also purchased dubbing rights. Then, Ravichandran tried to find distributors. Without a complete plan, Ravichandran ended up selling his distribution rights. Ramachari became a hit.

== Soundtrack ==
Hamsalekha composed the music for the film and the 8 songs in the soundtrack. The song "Nammoora Yuvarani" was supposed to sung by S. P. Balasubrahmanyam but was finally sung by K. J. Yesudas.

All lyrics are written by Hamsalekha.

Track listing
| No. | Title | Singer(s) | Length |
|---|---|---|---|
| 1. | "Yaarivalu Yaarivalu" | Mano, chorus | 5:05 |
| 2. | "Nammoora Yuvarani" | K. J. Yesudas | 5:13 |
| 3. | "Aakashadaage Yaaro" | Mano, S. Janaki | 5:07 |
| 4. | "Kaadiruve Ninagaagi" | S. Janaki | 4:47 |
| 5. | "Ramachari Haaduva" | K. J. Yesudas | 5:06 |
| 6. | "Ramachari Haaduva - Bit" | K. J. Yesudas | 2:20 |
| 7. | "Burude Burude" | Mano, K. S. Chithra | 4:40 |
| 8. | "Ramachari Haaduva" | S. Janaki | 4:47 |
| Total length: | | | 37:03 |

== Awards ==
- Music Director Hamsalekha won the Filmfare Award for Best Music Director (Kannada) for his music in the film.
- Singer K. J. Yesudas won the Karnataka State Award for the best play back singer male category in 1991-1992 for the song "Nammoora Yuvarani".
