= Savira Sullu =

- Video cover
- Directed by: B. Subba Rao
- Written by: Chi. Udayashankar (dialogues)
- Story by: Visu
- Based on: Manal Kayiru (1982)
- Produced by: N. Veeraswamy; V. Ravichandran
- Starring: V. Ravichandran; Radha; C R Simha; Manjula
- Cinematography: V. K. Kannan
- Edited by: N. Chandran
- Music by: Shankar–Ganesh
- Production company: Sri Eshwari Productions
- Release date: 27 May 1985
- Country: India
- Language: Kannada

Savira Sullu (Kannada: ಸಾವಿರ ಸುಳ್ಳು; English: Thousand Lies) is a 1985 Indian Kannada film, directed by B. Subba Rao and produced by N. Veeraswamy. The film stars V. Ravichandran, Radha (in her first significant role in Kannada), C. R. Simha, Lokesh and Manjula in the lead roles. The film has musical score by Shankar–Ganesh. The movie was a remake of the 1982 Tamil movie Manal Kayiru.

== Cast ==
- V. Ravichandran as Muddukrishna
- Radha as Uma
- C. R. Simha as Puttappa
- Manjula as Durga
- Lokesh as Na.Ra.da.Naidu
- B. R. Prasanna Kumar
- Sundar Raj
- Balakrishna
- Leelavathi

== Soundtrack ==
- "Aakasha Neenadare" – S. Janaki, S. P. Balasubrahmanyam
- "Hennendarenu" – S. Janaki, S. P. Balasubrahmanyam
- "Intha Ganda Node Illa" – S. Janaki, S. P. Balasubrahmanyam
- "Kannere Ingithe" – S. P. Balasubrahmanyam
