= Inquilaab (1984 film) =

- Poster
- Directed by: T. Rama Rao
- Screenplay by: M. D. Sunder, Kader Khan
- Story by: M. D. Sunder
- Based on: Chakravyuha (1983)
- Produced by: N. Veeraswamy; V. Ravichandran
- Starring: Amitabh Bachchan; Sridevi
- Cinematography: S. Gopala Reddy
- Edited by: J. Krishnaswamy; V. Balasubramanian
- Music by: Laxmikant–Pyarelal
- Production company: Sri Eswari Productions
- Release date: 25 January 1984
- Country: India
- Language: Hindi

Inquilaab (transl. Revolution) is a 1984 Indian Hindi-language political action thriller film, starring Amitabh Bachchan and Sridevi in lead roles, with Utpal Dutt, Kader Khan, Ranjeet, Shakti Kapoor and others in supporting roles. Nirupa Roy also appears as the mother of Amitabh Bachchan's character in one scene. The movie was produced by N. Veeraswamy and V. Ravichandran, and the music was composed by Laxmikant-Pyarelal. It is a remake of 1983 Kannada film Chakravyuha (1983), which was also produced by V. Ravichandran.

== Plot ==
Amarnath aka Amar is an educated-young man, who has not received any qualified job as all positions force him to compromise his morals. A new politician, Shankar Narayan promises an end to corruption, but he is disrespected by the crowd and stoned. Amar rescues him. This impresses Shankar, who then trains Amar to be a cop. Amar completes his IPS exam and is posted as an ACP. He serves the state honestly in this role. Amar meets Asha, who is the only daughter of a wealthy businessman, Seetharam. The two fall for each other and after some convincing by Amar Seetharam accepts the relationship.

Amar discovers a criminal network that includes Shankar as well as Seetharam. He goes on to discover, much to his chagrin, that he has been manipulated into serving this criminal syndicate - that he has been made a pawn in their criminal schemes.

Amar is blackmailed into collaborating with them when they show him a photograph of Seetharam's partner receiving a briefcase from him (Amar) - the implication being that it is a bribe.

Seetharam's partner is revealed to be an international smuggler named Richard Louis. Amar is ordered by Seetharam to retrieve diamonds from Richard Louis and to help him avoid the police. Amar does the job, but kills Richard Louis and gains immense popularity with the public by doing so.

Amar's colleague, inspector Pratap, acting on orders from the police commissioner issues a warrant to search Amar's house. Prathap knows that Amar has retrieved the diamonds from Richard Louis, but he is unable to find the diamonds because Amar has hidden them inside his fake bandages. Asha misunderstanding Amar's intentions and actions leaves him along with their new-born child. Heartbroken at the separation, Amar resigns from the police force.

Encouraged by Shankar Amar files for a nomination in the elections and becomes the CM with the network's support as they form the government with their syndicate members. In their cabinet meeting, Amar smuggles out a machine gun and reveals his intentions to massacre every one of the syndicate's members for the sake of the country's welfare. He follows through, killing them all including Seetharam and Shankar.

Asha learns about Seetharam's misdeeds and the blackmail and reconciles with Amar. Amar surrenders to the police for his crimes and is arrested whereupon the public protests and demands that Amar be released.

== Cast ==
- Amitabh Bachchan as Amarnath (Amar)
- Sridevi as Asha
- Utpal Dutt as Seetaram
- Kader Khan as Shankar Narayan
- Shakti Kapoor as Koya Koya Attachi
- Ranjeet as Bhupati / B. Pathi
- Nirupa Roy as Amarnath's Mother
- Purnima as Amarnath's Aunty
- Iftekhar as Police Commissioner
- Shafi Inamdar as Inspector Pratap
- Jagdish Raj as IG Shamsher Singh
- T. P. Jain as Victor Jairaj
- C. S. Dubey as Saraswati Prasad
- Pinchoo Kapoor as Vishwanath
- Ram Mohan as Kamleshswar Rao
- Viju Khote as Bhupati's Associate
- Tiger Prabhakar as Anil Raj

== Reception ==
Despite completing a silver jubilee, the film was considered to only be an average hit.

== Soundtrack ==
The music was composed by Laxmikant-Pyarelal, while the lyrics were by Anand Bakshi. The film contains 5 songs, all sung by Kishore Kumar (including 2 duets with Asha Bhosle).

Song	Singer
"Abhimanyu Chakravyuha Mein"	Kishore Kumar
"Lo Main Ban Gaya Thanedar"	Kishore Kumar
"Disco 84, Disco 84"	Kishore Kumar
"Aaj Abhi Yahin, Nahin Nahin Nahin, Phir Kabhi Kahin"	Kishore Kumar, Asha Bhosle
"Sare Badan Mein Zahar Chad Gaya, Bichchhu Lad Gaya"	Kishore Kumar, Asha Bhosle
