= Gharwali Baharwali =

1998 Indian film by David Dhawan

Gharwai Baharwai
- Directed by: David Dhawan
- Screenplay by: Rumi Jaffery
- Story by: K. Bhagyaraj
- Based on: Thaikulame Thaikulame by N. Murugesh
- Produced by: Tutu Sharma
- Starring: Anil Kapoor; Raveena Tandon; Rambha
- Cinematography: K.S. Prakash Rao
- Music by: Anu Malik
- Release date: 12 June 1998
- Country: India
- Language: Hindi

Gharwali Baharwali (translation: Wife and Mistress) is a 1998 Indian comedy drama film directed by David Dhawan and produced by Tutu Sharma. It stars Anil Kapoor, Raveena Tandon and Rambha in pivotal roles. The film is a remake of the Tamil film Thaikulame Thaikulame (1995). The film was a commercial success.

== Plot ==
Arun (Anil Kapoor), a 28-year-old man, is married to Kaajal (Raveena Tandon) and they have been trying to conceive a child for some time. After going for some tests, the doctor (Asrani) informs them that they cannot, and this is due to Arun's "shortcomings". However, the doctor then secretly confesses to Arun that it is in fact Kaajal who cannot conceive, and he lied to spare her from the shock .

Arun's father, Hiralal (Kader Khan) discovers this and tries to force Arun to marry again as he wants a grandchild - however, Arun refuses to remarry and insists on staying with Kaajal.

3 years later

One day, Jumbo (Satish Kaushik) and Arun go to Nepal, were Jumbo comes across a girl, Manisha (Rambha), who is about to be publicly disgraced. He arranges the girl's freedom by stating that Arun will marry the girl - without conferring with Arun. Arun attends the wedding ceremony, unbeknownst to him that he is in fact the groom and the ceremony is being performed around him, owed essentially to the fact that they were speaking a different language and the ceremony was different from that in India.

Shortly after the ceremony, he discovers that he is now married to Manisha, and had been tricked into doing so by Jumbo. Arun returns to India, where he remains in contact with Manisha, learning that she is pregnant, and learns to speak fluent Hindi from their mutual friend Gopal (Tiku Talsania), whom they met in Nepal. Hiralal now desperately wants a grandchild to lighten up his life, so he requests the couple to adopt a child. However, by this time - Arun now has a child with Manisha in Nepal and proceeds to adopt the child with Kajaal, and they name him Rinku.

Hiralal discovers from Jumbo that Arun has a second wife named Manisha who is in fact Rinku's biological mother. He brings back Manisha from Nepal to India. Kaajal employs Manisha as a house-maid after she helps an injured Rinku. Oneday, after Hiralal and Manisha return from the cinema, Kajaal confronts her father-in-law and questions him why he is favoring the house-maid over his own daughter-in-law. Another day, she sees Manisha feeding Rinku and gets furious. Kajaal tries to marry off Manisha but Arun calls off the marriage. Kajaal attempts to throw Manisha out of the house and accuses either Arun or Hiralal of having an illicit affair with her. Arun slaps Kaajal in an act of anger and then declares that Manisha has as much right to the house as she does, and even more right to be with Rinku than Kaajal - as his second wife and Rinku's biological mother. Jumbo reveals the story of Manisha and Arun's marriage. Hiralal discloses the fact that Kajal is the one who cannot conceive. With Rinku and Jumbo, Arun leaves for his grandmother's village in dismay where he discovers Hiralal and both his wives- Kaajal and Manisha present. The story concludes with everyone accepting the situation of polygyny and living together.

== Cast ==
- Anil Kapoor as Arun H. Verma: Kajal and Manisha's husband, Rinku's father and Hiralal's son
- Raveena Tandon as Kaajal A. Verma: Arun's first/legal wife, Rinku's step-mother/adoptive mother
- Rambha as Manisha A. Verma: Arun's second/illegitimate wife, Rinku's mother
- Satish Kaushik as Jumbo
- Kader Khan as Hiralal Verma: Arun's father, Rinku's grandfather, Kajal and Manisha's father-in-law
- Tiku Talsania as Ram Gopal
- Asrani as Dr. Ved
- Rakesh Bedi as Mr. Kaushik Chopra
- Dina Pathak as Dadi Maa: Hiralal's mother, Arun's grandmother, Rinku's great-grandmother
- Shehzad Khan as Vinod Bhalla
- Madhuri Dixit (Special Appearance)
- Benny Pradhan
- A. K. Rana
- Master Shahrukh as Rinku: Arun and Manisha's son, Kaajal's step-son/adopted son

== Soundtrack ==
Gharwali Baharwali

Soundtrack album by Anu Malik
- Released: 1 April 1998
- Genre: Feature film soundtrack
- Label: T-Series

All lyrics are written by Dev Kohli, Nitin Raikwar, Sameer; all music is composed by Anu Malik.

Songs
No.	Title	Playback	Length
1.	"Ek Taraf Hai Gharwali Ek Taraf Baharwali"	Udit Narayan, Anuradha Sriram
2.	"Ghunghat Mein Chehra"	Vinod Rathod, Shankar Mahadevan
3.	"Love Love Karle"	Udit Narayan, Poornima, Anu Malik
4.	"Nepal Ki Thandi Hawa"	Udit Narayan, Anu Malik, Anuradha Paudwal
5.	"Rab Jaane Bhai Rab Jaane"	Udit Narayan, Anuradha Sriram, Anu Malik
6.	"Tara Raara Raara Ra"	Kumar Sanu, Anuradha Sriram
