= Naariya Seere Kadda =

- Directed by: BMP Annaiah
- Written by: BMP Annaiah
- Produced by: D. B. Kumaraswamy
- Starring: V. Ravichandran; Naveen Krishna; Nikita Thukral; Harshika Poonacha
- Cinematography: K M Vishnuvardhan
- Edited by: Sanjeev Reddy
- Music by: Rajesh Ramanath
- Production company: Sri Gouthami Enterprises
- Release date: 26 November 2010
- Running time: 136 minutes
- Country: India
- Language: Kannada

Naariya Seere Kadda (Kannada: ನಾರಿಯ ಸೀರೆ ಕದ್ದ) is a 2010 Indian Kannada language action film written and directed by BMP Annaiah. The film stars V. Ravichandran, Naveen Krishna, Nikita Thukral and Harshika Poonacha in the lead roles. While the main music composer is V. Manohar, Ravichandran has composed, written and directed one song in the film.

The film released on 26 November 2010 across Karnataka. Upon release, the film generally met wide negative reviews from the critics and audience.

== Cast ==
- V. Ravichandran as Gopal
- Naveen Krishna as Vijay
- Nikita Thukral as Rekha
- Harshika Poonacha
- Shobharaj
- Bullet Prakash
- M. S. Umesh
- Shivaram
- Rekha Das
- Dingri Nagaraj

== Soundtrack ==
Naariya Seere Kadda

Soundtrack album by V. Manohar, V. Ravichandran
- Released: September 2010
- Genre: Film soundtrack
- Label: Manoranjan Audio

The audio comprises total 4 songs out of which 3 songs are composed and written by V. Manohar and one song is composed and written by V. Ravichandran. The audio launch took place at a Bangalore hotel in September 2010. Actor turned producer Raghavendra Rajkumar released the audio in the presence of entire film team.

All lyrics are written by V. Manohar; all music is composed by V. Manohar.

Track listing
No.	Title	Singer(s)	Length
1.	"Naviloora Devi"	Santhosh, Nanditha
2.	"Naajooku Naajooku"	Rajesh Krishnan, Vijaya Shankar
3.	"Kole Kole"	Rajesh Krishnan, Anuradha Bhat
4.	"Neere Neere Panneere(Composed and written by V. Ravichandran)"	Srinivas, Anuradha Sriram

== Reception ==
=== Critical response ===
A critic from The Times of India scored the film at 2.5 out of 5 stars and wrote "Ravichandran, though impressive, donnes an awkward look with his silly make-up and dark glasses. Only Naveen Krishna's performance holds up, while Rekha Das does a brilliant job in balancing sequences in the average cinematography by Vishnuvardhan". BSS from Deccan Herald wrote "The director makes a hash of a ready-made, worn out story. Ravichandran, the entertainer-actor, is lost in hideous wigs, stubble and pot-belly; a makeover is long overdue. He owes his fans at least that much. Nikhitha goes through the motions, while Naveen, Harshika, Shivaram, Shobhraj and Arvind are all wasted. A pity". A critic from Bangalore Mirror wrote "Even Ravichandran enters the house as a 'protector.' The story stutters, hitches, drags and puts you to sleep mode — if you are lucky that is.Laced with many uninspiring sequences, there is a mismatch about almost everything in the film.Even Ravichandran is made to act as if it were a television sitcom".
