= Ravichandran (Kannada actor) =

Indian film director and actor

V. Ravichandran
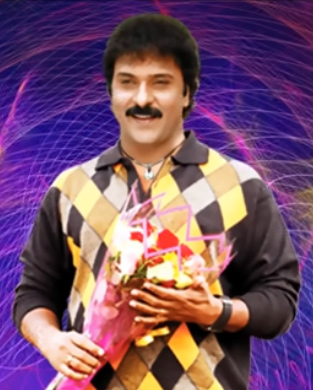
- V. Ravichandran
- Born: Veeraswamy Ravichandran; 30 May 1961 (age 65); Bengaluru, Mysore State, India
- Other names: Crazy Star, Kanasugara, Ravi Mama
- Occupations: Actor; filmmaker; composer; Lyricist; Television Presenter
- Years active: 1968–present
- Spouse: Sumathy (m. 1986)
- Children: 3, including Manoranjan
- Father: N. Veeraswamy
- Relatives: Balaji (brother)

Veeraswamy Ravichandran (born 30 May 1961), known mononymously as Ravichandran, is an Indian actor, director, producer, music director, lyricist and editor working predominantly in Kannada cinema. The son of film producer N. Veeraswamy, he continues to produce and distribute films under his father's production house, Sri Eswari Productions. He is popularly referred to as "Crazy Star" by the media and his fans.

Starting his acting career as a child artist in Dhoomakethu (1968) and Kula Gowrava (1971), Ravichandran started early as a co-producer for films such as Khadeema Kallaru (1982) and Chakravyuha (1983) besides acting in supporting roles. His lead role films started with Premigala Saval (1984), Pralayanthaka (1984) and Swabhimana (1985). He got his career best breakthrough with the film Premaloka in 1987 for which he directed, produced and acted in the lead role. Since then, Ravichandran films are considered to be technically savvy and lavish in production. His subsequent films such as Ranadheera (1988), Anjada Gandu (1988), Yuddha Kanda (1989), Ramachaari (1991), Mane Devru (1993), Putnanja (1995), Sipayi (1996), Yaare Neenu Cheluve (1998), Preethsod Thappa (1998), Kanasugara (2001), Ekangi (2002), Malla (2004), Drishya (2014) among others have been successful at the box office and made him one of the most prominent personalities in Kannada cinema.

In 2002, for the film Ekangi, Ravichandran won Best Director, Best Actor and Best Music director awards at the Karnataka State Film Awards. Besides he has won Special Jury Award for Shanti Kranti (1991). In addition to these, Ravichandran has been honored with Karnataka State Puttanna Kanagal Award for Lifetime Achievements, Filmfare Lifetime Achievement Award – South, Kannada Rajyotsava Award on 2010, Udaya Film Award for Best Supporting Actor for Aham Premasmi (2005) and NTR National Award in 2013. He has been honored with Doctorate twice, from Dr. Manmohan Singh Bengaluru City University (BCU) and CMR University, in his career.

== Personal life ==
Ravichandran was born on 30 May 1961 in Bengaluru, Mysore State (now Karnataka), India in a Tamil speaking family to N. Veeraswamy Mudaliar and Pattammal, N.Veeraswamy was a producer of Kannada films. Ravichandran married Sumathi, on Valentine's Day 1986. The couple has a daughter Geethanjali, and two sons Manoranjan and Vikram. Manoranjan made his acting debut with Saheba (2017).

== Career ==
=== 1980-1990: Debut and early stardom ===
Ravichandran made his first on screen appearance as child actor in Dhoomakethu (1968) and Kula Gourava (1971) - both starring Dr. Rajkumar, the latter also being his father's first film as an independent producer in which he played the younger role of Rajkumar in the film. Later in 1982, at 20, he became an independent producer with the film Prema Mathsara under "Ravi Cine Creations" banner. Following this, he began to act as well as co-produce along with his father for the films such as Khadeema Kallaru (1982), Chakravyuha (1983) and its Hindi remake Inquilaab (1984) starring Amitabh Bachchan and Sridevi in lead roles. While Chakravyuha turned out to be commercially successful, its Hindi remake was an average grosser. This was followed by Pralayanthaka for which he acted in the lead role for the first time besides co-producing. In 1985, Ravichandran ventured into Tamil cinema by producing the Sivaji Ganesan, Rajinikanth starrer Padikkathavan. This was a remake of Hindi film Khud-Daar (1982). He continued to enact and co-produce films such as Savira Sullu and Naanu Nanna Hendthi through which his long association with director D. Rajendra Babu started. Alongside, he also featured as second lead in films such as Pithamaha and Swabhimana. In 1986, he starred in Tamil film, Poi Mugangal based on the novel Kakitha Changiligal (transl. Paper chains) by writer Sujatha. He was credited as Rakesh in order not to confuse the audience with the other Tamil actor, Ravichandran.

The year 1987 proved to be biggest breakthrough for Ravichandran with his debut directorial film, Premaloka. The film achieved a cult-status years after its release and is considered to be one of the milestone successes in Kannada cinema. The film became the highest grossing Kannada film of the year. Besides directing, producing and scripting, Ravichandran enacted in the lead role along with Bollywood actress-model Juhi Chawla, who delivered her first hit in her career. The film's music by Hamsalekha was highly acclaimed and the audio cassettes amounting to 35 Lakhs, a record high, were sold by Lahari Audio company. The film also marked the decades long association of Ravichandran with music director Hamsalekha. The film was simultaneously shot in Tamil as Paruva Ragam and released at the same time.

In 1988, Ravichandran appeared in Rajachandra's ensemble drama Brahma Vishnu Maheshwara alongside Anant Nag and Ambarish where he played the role of Lawyer Narayan. This was followed by two blockbuster hits Ranadheera and Anjada Gandu. While the former, a remake of Subhash Ghai's hit film Hero, was a silver jubilee hit with a theatrical run of 25 weeks and was declared a blockbuster at the box office and recorded 108 days of full-house shows in a theatre, the latter film was a remake of 1984 Tamil film Thambikku Entha Ooru and was declared blockbuster hit. Both the films had Ravichandran pairing up with actress Khushbu who made her debut in Kannada cinema. This was followed by back-to-back successes with Yuddha Kaanda and Yuga Purusha, both in 1989. The same year he reunited with Juhi Chawla and directed the film Kindari Jogi which could not replicate the success of Premaloka.

=== 1991-2000: Career expansion and successful collaborations ===
Throughout the 1990s, Ravichandran expanded his career horizons by collaborating with different directors and most of the films released in this decade had musical score by Hamsalekha. He worked with leading directors such as P. Vasu, Rajendra Singh Babu, Om Sai Prakash and D. Rajendra Babu. His association with D. Rajendra Babu is very successful, resulting in several hits, including Naanu Nanna Hendthi (1985), Ramachaari (1991), Sriramachandra (1992), Annayya (1993) and Yaare Neenu Cheluve (1998).

In 1991, Ravichandran's ambitious pan-Indian film, Shanti Kranti (1991) was released which was in the making since 1988. He cast Juhi Chawla for the third time after Premaloka and Kindari Jogi in the opposite lead role. The film was simultaneously shot in Hindi, Tamil, and Telugu languages. While Rajinikanth played the lead in the Hindi and Tamil versions, Nagarjuna was the lead in Telugu version. Made at a budget of Rs.10 crore, it was the most expensive Indian film till then. Upon its release, the film was panned by critics and was declared as a disaster at the box office, earning only Rs.8 crore worldwide. This loss made a huge impact on Ravichandran and he went bankrupt. To make up for this huge loss, he began to act in films directed by others such as Ramachaari (1991), Halli Meshtru (1992), Chikkejamanru (1992), Gadibidi Ganda (1993), Annayya (1993). Each of these films were remake films from other languages and turned out to be commercially very successful as well.

He returned to direction with films Mane Devru (1993), Chinna (1994), Putnanja (1995), Sipayi (1996), Kalavida (1997), Preethsod Thappa (1998) and found success again. For Sipayi he roped in Telugu actor Chiranjeevi in the parallel lead role. Most of the films released during this decade were the remakes of successful Tamil, Telugu and Hindi films. Throughout the 1990s, Ravichandran paired up with actresses like Meena, Gouthami, Madhoo, Sukanya, Bhanupriya, Roja, Ramya Krishna, Yamuna, Kasthuri, Heera, Nagma and Shilpa Shetty, who made their debut in Kannada cinema.

Ravichandran and Hamsalekha collaboration exceeded over 20 films in the 1990s. The success of Premaloka paved the way for this collaboration and throughout the 90s until Preethsod Thappa (1998), their bonding was considered to be strong. However, they fell apart in 1999 over creative differences and Ravichandran himself started composing music for his films. The end of their long-standing partnership proved to be unsuccessful for both of them. In 1999, Ravichandran scored music, besides acting, for films such as Naanu Nanna Hendthiru, Sneha, O Premaveand Chora Chittha Chora. In the year 2000, he directed and appeared in O Nanna Nalle, a remake of Tamil film Thullatha Manamum Thullum, alongside Isha Koppikar. The film was successful at the box-office.

=== 2001-2013: Career slump and setbacks ===
In 2001, Ravichandran continued acting in several remake films under different production banners including Rockline Productions' Usire, Sa Ra Govindu produced Kanasugara and Vyjayanthi Movies bankrolled film Premakke Sai. All these films were remakes of successful Tamil and Telugu projects. The year 2002 proved another setback for Ravichandran who embarked on an ambitious film Ekangi. Shot inside a massive glass mansion built at a cost of Rs.80 lakh, the film promised to be a unique take on loneliness. Despite garnering the Karnataka State Film Awards in various segments (including Best Director and Best Music director) and favorable reviews, the musical film failed to please the audience and by his own admission, the film wrecked the actor on multiple levels In 2003, Ravichandran featured in Ondagona Baa, a remake of Telugu film, Kalisundam Raa (2000) which was considered to be a reunion film with Hamsalekha. However, the film underperformed at the box office.

In 2004, Ravichandran tasted success through his directorial, Malla which had Priyanka Upendra in the opposite lead. The film was declared a musical blockbuster upon its release and recovered most of the losses incurred through his earlier failure projects. However this success was short-lived with his next directorial Aham Premasmi failed at the box-office despite receiving positive reviews. The film starred Ravichandran's brother Balaji and Aarti Chhabria in the lead roles. Following this, a string of average unsuccessful films continued to release until he switched over to character roles in late 2010s.

=== 2014-present: Switch to character roles ===
After having moderate success in his previous lead role films, Ravichandran accepted to play as a father to actor Sudeepa in the film Maanikya (2014). The film, upon release, drew a major critical acclaim from critics particularly lauding the performances of both actors and their on-screen chemistry. This critical acclaim continued with his next release, Drishya (2014), a remake of Malayalam film Drishyam, where he played the role portrayed by Mohanlal in the original version. Upon release, the performances of Ravichandran, Navya Nair and Asha Sarath received overwhelmingly positive reviews, along with the film's screenplay.

His next directorial film Apoorva (2016) was a love story which takes place between a 61-year-old man and 19-year-old girl. The film was declared a "flop" at the box-office. Later in the year, he appeared in the successful film Mungaru Male 2 directed by Preetham Gubbi and played the role of Ganesh's father. He teamed up again with Sudeepa, this time playing his brother's role in the film Hebbuli (2007). After a string of unsuccessful films, he took up the role of Lord Krishna, his first mythological role, for the film Kurukshetra (2019), which was based on the epic poem Gadhayuddha by Ranna, which itself was based on the Indian epic Mahabharata.

In 2021, he reprised his role of Rajendra Bopanna in Drishya 2, a sequel to Drishya. The film released to positive reviews and was a decent hit at the box-office. In 2022, he played the titular role in Ravi Bopanna a remake of Malayalam film Joseph. A critic from Bangalore Mirror reviewed expressing "Ravichandran's fans will enjoy this flick as he is the hero as well as the villain and also as crazy as they love him to be".

In 2023, Ravichandran appeared in the action drama Kranti directed by V. Harikrishna and played Darshan's father role. The film received mixed to negative reviews from critics His next film scheduled for release is KD - The Devil starring Dhruva Sarja in the lead role.

== In the media ==
He started his company Eswari Audio later to be known as Eswari Entertainments. He was also awarded as the Best Musical Director on the state level. He not only brought the trend of Big-Budget Movies to Kannada cinema but also brought in Digital Grading technology. He started selling music cassettes through cable operators to beat piracy. Ravichandran was also seen on television as a judge in Dancing-star season-2 on Colors Kannada.

== Filmography ==
Key
†	Denotes films that have not yet been released

=== As actor ===
Year	Title	Role	Notes				
Year	Title	Role	Notes	1968	Dhoomakethu	Ravikumar	Child actor
1971	Kula Gourava	Young Shankar	Child actor				
1982	Khadeema Kallaru	Johnny					
1983	Chakravyuha	Khoya Khoya Hatachi / Richard Louis	(Note: Ravichandran co-produced the film with N. Veeraswamy.)				
1984	Naane Raja	Raja					
1984	Premigala Saval	Raja					
1984	Pralayanthaka	Raja / Johnny					
1985	Savira Sullu	Muddukrishna					
1985	Pithamaha	Shankar					
1985	Swabhimana	Vijay					
1985	Naanu Nanna Hendthi	Ravi					
1986	Na Ninna Preetisuve	Vijay					
1986	Asambhava	Veerabhadra					
1986	Poi Mugangal	Raja	Tamil film; credited as Rakesh				
1987	Premaloka	Ravi					
1987	Paruva Ragam	Ravi	Tamil film				
1987	Sangrama	Arjun Brahmavar					
1988	Brahma Vishnu Maheshwara	Narayan					
1988	Ranadheera	Ranadheera (Murali) (Note: Ravichandran played a single character with two or more names.)					
1988	Anjada Gandu	Anand					
1988	Ramanna Shamanna	Shyam					
1989	Yuddha Kaanda	Ravi Bramhavar					
1989	Yuga Purusha	Raaja					
1989	Kindari Jogi	Kindari Jogi / Ravi					
1989	Poli Huduga	Vijay Kumar					
1990	Bannada Gejje	Manu					
1990	Abhimanyu	Abhimanyu					
1991	Ramachaari	Ramachaari					
1991	Shanti Kranti	Subhash (Bharath in Telugu, Hindi and Tamil)	Multilingual film Also director				
1991	Nattukku Oru Nallavan	Subhash (Bharath in Telugu, Hindi and Tamil)	Multilingual film Also director				
1992	Halli Meshtru	Meshtru					
1992	Gopi Krishna	Gopikrishna / (Muddukrishna)					
1992	Guru Brahma	Guru / Bhramha					
1992	Chikkejamanru	Chikkejamanru					
1992	Sriramachandra	Srirama, Chandra (Note: Ravichandran played dual roles in this film.)					
1992	Belliyappa Bangarappa		Guest appearance				
1993	Gadibidi Ganda	Gopal					
1993	Annayya	Annayya					
1993	Mane Devru	Ranganath					
1994	Chinna	Chinna					
1994	Rasika	Krishna					
1994	Jaana	Ravishankar					
1995	Putnanja	Putnanja					
1996	Sipayi	Sipayi / Shivu					
1997	Kalavida	Vishwa					
1997	Mommaga	Soorappa "Soori"					
1997	Cheluva	Cheluva, Vijay					
1998	Yaare Neenu Cheluve	Surya					
1998	Mangalyam Tantunanena	Vijay					
1998	Kanasalu Neene Manasalu Neene	Himself	Guest appearance				
1998	Preethsod Thappa	Raja					
1999	Ravimama	Ravi					
1999	Naanu Nanna Hendthiru	Sriram					
1999	Sneha	Murali					
1999	O Premave	Raja					
1999	Chora Chittha Chora	Raja					
2000	Mahathma						
2000	Preethsu Thappenilla	Balu					
2000	O Nanna Nalle	Raja					
2001	Premakke Sai	Venu					
2001	Kanasugara	Ravi					
2001	Usire	Mutthu					
2002	Preethi Mado Hudugarigella	Ravi					
2002	Ekangi	Ravi, Raja					
2002	Kodanda Rama	Kodanda					
2003	Ondagona Baa	Raghu					
2004	Malla	Mallikarjuna, Shiva					
2004	Rama Krishna	Rama					
2004	Sahukara	Muthu					
2005	Aham Premasmi	God of Love					
2005	Pandu Ranga Vittala	Vithala (Pandu, Ranga)					
2006	Neenello Naanalle	Bullock cart driver	Special appearance				
2006	Hatavadi	Balu					
2006	Odahuttidavalu	Puttaraju					
2006	Ravi Shastri	Ravi Shastri					
2006	Neelakanta	Neelakanta					
2007	Ugadi	Sanjay					
2008	Nee Tata Naa Birla	Ravi					
2009	Rajakumari	Music Teacher	Guest appearance				
2010	Hoo	Anand					
2010	Naariya Seere Kadda	Gopal					
2010	Aithalakkadi		Special appearance				
2011	Mallikarjuna	Mallikarjuna, Surya					
2011	Kalla Malla Sulla	Ravi					
2012	Narasimha	Narasimha					
2012	Dashamukha	Ravindranath R.					
2012	Crazy Loka	Basavaraj Kattimane					
2014	Crazy Star	Ravi					
2014	Maanikya	Adishesha					
2014	Drishya	Rajendra Ponnappa					
2014	Paramashiva	Shiva					
2015	Vajrakaya	Hanuman devotee	Special appearance				
2015	Love You Alia	Ravi					
2016	Apoorva	Rajashekar					
2016	Lakshmana	Police Officer	Guest appearance				
2016	Mungaru Male 2	Preetham's father					
2017	Hebbuli	Sathya Moorthy					
2018	Seizer	Seizer's Boss					
2018	Buckasura	Chakaravrthy					
2019	Padde Huli	Manju's father					
2019	Dasharatha	Dasharatha					
2019	Kurukshetra	Krishna					
2019	Aa Drushya	Surya Tej					
2021	Kannadiga	Gunabhadra					
2021	Drishya 2	Rajendra Ponnappa					
2022	Ravi Bopanna	Ravi Bopanna					
2022	Head Bush	Professor	Guest appearance				
2022	Vijayanand	Ganesh Dada					
2023	Kranti	Bhargava Rayanna					
2024	The Judgement	Govind Prasad					
2025	Tapassi	Ravish Vaidyanathan					
2025	Junior	Kodanda	Bilingual film; Also shot in Telugu				
2025	Gowrishankara	Gowrishankara					
2025	Andondittu Kaala	Himself	Guest appearance				
2025	Marutha						
2025	KD - The Devil	Annayyappa	Guest appearance				
2026	Ayogya 2		Guest appearance				

=== As director, producer and writer ===
Year	Film	Credited as					Notes
Year	Film	Director	Producer	Writer	Music director	Editor	Notes
1982	Prema Matsara		Yes				
1982	Khadeema Kallaru		Yes				
1983	Chakravyuha		Yes				
1984	Inquilaab		Yes				Hindi Film
1984	Pralayanthaka		Yes				
1985	Savira Sullu		Yes				
1985	Naanu Nanna Hendthi		Yes				
1985	Padikkadavan		Yes				Tamil film
1987	Premaloka	Yes	Yes	Yes			
1987	Paruva Ragam	Yes	Yes	Yes			Tamil film
1988	Ranadheera	Yes	Yes	Screenplay			
1989	Kindari Jogi	Yes	Yes	Yes			
1991	Ramachaari		Yes				
1991	Shanti Kranti	Yes	Yes				Kannada-Telugu-Hindi film
1991	Nattukku Oru Nallavan	Yes	Yes	Yes			Tamil film
1992	Halli Meshtru	Yes	Yes				
1992	Gopi Krishna	Yes	Yes	Yes			
1993	Mane Devru	Yes		Yes			
1994	Chinna	Yes		Yes			
1995	Putnanja	Yes	Yes	Yes			
1996	Sipayi	Yes	Yes	Yes			
1997	Kalavida	Yes		Yes			
1997	Mommaga	Yes		Screenplay			
1997	Cheluva	Yes					
1998	Preethsod Thappa	Yes		Yes			
1999	Naanu Nanna Hendthiru				Yes		
1999	Sneha				Yes		
1999	O Premave				Yes		
1999	Chora Chittha Chora				Yes		
2000	Mahathma				Yes		
2000	Preethsu Thappenilla				Yes		
2000	O Nanna Nalle	Yes		Yes	Yes		
2002	Ekangi	Yes	Yes	Yes	Yes		
2002	Kodanda Rama	Yes		Yes	Yes		
2004	Malla	Yes		Yes	Yes		
2005	Ayya			Lyrics	Yes		
2005	Aham Premasmi	Yes	Yes	Yes	Yes	Yes	
2005	Thunta			Lyrics			
2005	Pandu Ranga Vittala				Yes		
2006	Hatavadi	Yes	Yes	Yes	Yes	Yes	
2006	Neelakanta				Yes		
2010	Hoo	Yes		Screenplay		Yes	
2010	Aithalakkadi			Lyrics			
2010	Naariya Seere Kadda			Lyrics			
2014	Crazy Star	Yes	Yes	Yes	Yes	Yes	
2016	Apoorva	Yes	Yes	Yes	Yes	Yes	
2022	Ravi Bopanna	Yes	Yes	Screenplay	Yes	Yes	

== Awards ==
Cinema Express Awards

- Cinema Express Award For Best Debut Director - Premaloka - 1987
- Cinema Express Award For Best Actor - Premaloka - 1987
- Cinema Express Award For Best Director - Ranadheera - 1989

Karnataka State Film Awards

- Karnataka State Film Award (Special Jury Award) – Shanti Kranti
- Karnataka State Film Award for Best Actor – Ekangi (2001–02)
- Karnataka State Film Award for Best Director for Ekangi (2001–02)
- Karnataka State Film Award for Best Music Director for Ekangi (2001–02)
- Puttanna Kanagal Award for Lifetime Achievement (2005–06)

Other awards

- Suvarna Film Awards for Lifetime Achievement
- Rajyotsava Awards (2010)
- Udaya Film Award for Best Supporting Actor – Aham Premasmi
- NTR National Award - 2013
- Honorary Doctorate From CMR University - 2019
- Honorary Doctorate From Dr. Manmohan Singh Bengaluru City University- 2022
