= Poi Mugangal =

- VCD cover
- Directed by: C. V. Rajendran
- Based on: Kakitha Changiligal by Sujatha
- Produced by: P. Ramdas; S. Bangarusami
- Starring: Rakesh; Sulakshana
- Music by: Shankar–Ganesh
- Production company: Preethi Creations
- Release date: 28 March 1986
- Country: India
- Language: Tamil

Poi Mugangal (transl. False faces) is a 1986 Indian Tamil-language film directed by C. V. Rajendran. The film stars Kannada actor V. Ravichandran (credited as Rakesh) and Sulakshana. It is based on the novel Kakitha Changiligal (transl. Paper chains) by Sujatha. The film was released on 28 March 1986.

== Plot ==
The story is about a young husband who has a kidney disorder. Since he (love) married against he father's wishes, he was not in good terms with his family members. His wife was in search of donor and pleads with husband's blood relatives one by one to wait for an alternative kidney. His health deteriorates day by day. All made her wait or deny. Had she found anyone and what happen to husband forms the crux of the story.

== Cast ==
- Rakesh as Raja
- Sulakshana as Indu
- Y. G. Mahendran as Vasanth
- Sivachandran
- Arundhati
- V. S. Raghavan
- V. Gopalakrishnan

== Soundtrack ==
The songs were composed by Shankar–Ganesh, with lyrics by Vairamuthu.

Track listing
No.	Title	Singer(s)	Length
1.	"Thottu Kondal Oru Inbam Punnagai"	K. J. Yesudas	4:33
2.	"Megam Renda"	S. P. Balasubrahmanyam	4:46
3.	"Inge Naam Kaanum Paasam Ellame"	K. J. Yesudas	4:46
4.	"Uttam Pudu Pata"	S. P. Balasubrahmanyam, S. P. Sailaja	4:07
Total length:			18:12

== Reception ==
Kalki noted that, despite deviating from the source material, it was still a good film.
