= Kindari Jogi =

- VCD cover
- Directed by: V. Ravichandran
- Written by: Renuka Sharma; V. Ravichandran
- Produced by: N. Veeraswamy; V. Ravichandran
- Starring: V. Ravichandran; Juhi Chawla
- Cinematography: R. Madhusudhan
- Edited by: K. Balu
- Music by: Hamsalekha
- Production company: Sri Eshwari Productions
- Release date: 10 August 1989
- Running time: 133 minutes
- Country: India
- Language: Kannada

Kindari Jogi is a 1989 Indian Kannada language fantasy romantic drama film directed, co-written and enacted by V. Ravichandran along with Juhi Chawla pairing together again after the successful previous film Premaloka (1988). The supporting cast includesLokesh, Doddanna and Mukhyamantri Chandru.

Produced by N. Veeraswamy under Eshwari Productions, the film featured original score and soundtrack composed and written by Hamsalekha. The film did not do well at the box office.

== Plot ==
Kindari Jogi (V. Ravichandran) is a mythical person with superpowers. He lives in the world of children, music, art and happiness and never hesitates to do a good deed. Through his assistant, he happens to find Ravi (V. Ravichandran again), who does odd jobs for a living. Ravi had left his village Hanumapura so as to earn money for his sister's marriage. Due to Ravi's so called communist approach towards life, Kindari Jogi decides not to give him a huge amount of money for free, but go to his village and solve the problems.

Kindari Jogi in guise of Ravi reaches Hanumapura, a village that houses eccentric humans, a village where relations do not have much value, a village where drinking water is a major headache. The village is divided into two factions led by Rudrappa (Lokesh) and Devayya (Sundar Raj). Kindari Jogi falls in love with Ganga (Juhi Chawla), Deva's sister, with whose help he unites the two factions. He also gets the support of the children in the village. Afterwards after a prolonged drama, he manages to conduct his sister's (Ravi's sister's) marriage with her boyfriend and conduct a grand festival at the Lord Hanuman temple. However, a small misconception reignites the feud between the two factions, who begin to question each other's authority over the temple and keep it closed until a proper decision is taken. Eventually Kindari Jogi opens the temple by singing a song and goes inside along with Ganga and all the children in the village, where he transforms to his original form and takes them to his world. The villagers who witness these incidents are worried when they do not return from the temple.

The real Ravi returns to his village at this scenario confusing the people who are mourning the loss of their children. The people who believe him to be a black magician drive him away asking him never to come back. As a confused Ravi runs for his life a villager throws a knife which eventually strikes a wall in Kindari Jogi's world.

== Cast ==
- V. Ravichandran as Kindari Jogi and Ravi (double role)
- Juhi Chawla as Ganga
- Lokesh as Doddmane Rudrappa
- Sundar Raj as Deva
- Hema Choudhary
- Balakrishna
- Mukhyamantri Chandru as Anjaneyappa
- Thoogudeepa Srinivas
- Doddanna
- Dinesh
- Master Manjunath
- Master Anand
- Abhinaya

== Soundtrack ==
The music was composed and lyrics for the soundtrack penned by Hamsalekha.

Track listing
No.	Title	Lyrics	Singer(s)	Length
1.	"Banda Banda"	Hamsalekha	Hamsalekha
2.	"Ramana Bhanta"	Hamsalekha	Mano, Manjula Gururaj
3.	"Gange Baare Thunge Baare"	Hamsalekha	S. P. Balasubrahmanyam, S. Janaki
4.	"Kottalo Kottalamma"	Hamsalekha	S. P. Balasubrahmanyam, S. Janaki
5.	"Ooru Uddara Madtheenantha"	Hamsalekha	S. P. Balasubrahmanyam, S. Janaki
6.	"Aagallampe Hoogallampe"	Hamsalekha	S. P. Balasubrahmanyam, S. Janaki
7.	"Chendina Baale"	Hamsalekha	S. P. Balasubrahmanyam, S. Janaki
8.	"Haalakki Koogaithu"	Hamsalekha	S. P. Balasubrahmanyam, S. Janaki
