= Thaikulame Thaikulame =

- DVD cover
- Directed by: N. Murugesh
- Written by: K. Bhagyaraj; Crazy Mohan (dialogues)
- Story by: K. Bhagyaraj
- Produced by: Kovai M. Murugesan
- Starring: Pandiarajan; Urvashi; Vinaya Prasad
- Cinematography: G. Rajendran
- Edited by: M. Ganesan
- Music by: Deva
- Production company: Anand Cine Combines
- Release date: 22 September 1995
- Country: India
- Language: Tamil

Thaikulame Thaikulame (transl. Motherhood, oh Motherhood!) is a 1995 Indian Tamil-language comedy drama film directed by N. Murugesh while the story was written by K. Bhagyaraj. The film stars Pandiarajan, Urvashi and Vinaya Prasad while Vadivelu, and R. Sundarrajan appear in supporting roles. It was released on 22 September 1995, and did well at the box office. The film was remade in Telugu as Intlo Illalu Vantintlo Priyuralu, in Hindi as Gharwali Baharwali and in Kannada as Naanu Nanna Hendthiru. Master Mahendran won the Tamil Nadu State Film Award for Best Child Artist.

== Plot ==
Pandiyan and Janaki have been married a long time but have no children. The doctor informs Pandiyan that his wife cannot bear children. Not willing to hurt his wife's feelings, he takes the blame on himself. His father (R. Sundarrajan) pesters him to get married for a second time just to have a child. While on a business tour to Nepal, he marries a Nepali girl Monisha (Vinaya) under some unavoidable circumstances. When he learns that she is carrying his child, Pandiyan arranges for her stay at his friend's house. Monisha delivers a boy and Pandiyan adopts him with his wife's consent who is not aware of the truth. Unable to suppress her urge to be near her child, the Nepali girl comes as a cook to her husband's house. Pandiyan's father learns the truth and tells his son to accept Monisha and make a clean of things to Janaki. But Pandiyan who is apprehensive of his wife's reaction begs his father to keep the whole affair under the wraps. The story takes a turn to climax when Janaki, not happy with the goings on in the kitchen, tries to get Monisha married off to someone else. Janaki gots the knowledge all the truth admitted in hospital. The movie ends on note that Janaki takes her son with herself and leaves her Husband Pandian and Monisha.

== Cast ==
- Pandiarajan as Pandiyan
- Urvashi as Janaki
- Vinaya Prasad as Monisha
- Vadivelu as Tamilpitthan
- R. Sundarrajan as Pandiyan's father
- Major Sundarrajan as a doctor (guest appearance)
- Master Mahendran as Pandiyan's biological son and Janaki's adopted son
- Manager Cheena as doctor
- Master Udayaraj as Arun (Japan) (uncredited)

== Soundtrack ==
The soundtrack was composed by Deva.

Track listing
No.	Title	Lyrics	Singer(s)	Length
1.	"En Veettu Thottathile"	Vairamuthu	S. Janaki, Mano	05:08
2.	"Indirano Chandirano"	Vairamuthu	S. Janaki, Mano	04:49
3.	"Nepala Malai Oram"	Vairamuthu	S. P. Balasubrahmanyam, Swarnalatha	05:08
4.	"Oru Vatta Mugathil"	Vairamuthu	S. P. Balasubrahmanyam, Swarnalatha	05:07
5.	"Palu Palu Nepalu"	Vaali	Vadivelu	04:28
6.	"Redithati"	Vairamuthu	Sindhu	02:00
Total length:				31:10

== Reception ==
The Hindu wrote, "A hilarious comedy of an affluent businessman caught between two women, one a legal wife without a child and the other, a Nepali girl who bears him a son, and the efforts of the husband to get the boy into the family, lead to many ticklish moments which are competently handled by director S. Murugesh in Anandhi Cine Arts' `Thaikulamae Thaikulamae'. The story and screenplay are by K. Bhagyaraj with `Crazy' Mohan penning the dialogue, which sparks in fits and starts."
