= Preethsod Thappa =

- VCD cover
- Directed by: Ravichandran
- Story by: Krishna Vamshi
- Based on: Ninne Pelladata (1996)
- Produced by: Rockline Venkatesh
- Starring: Ravichandran; Shilpa Shetty; Prakash Raj; Lokesh
- Cinematography: G. S. V. Seetharam
- Edited by: P. R. Soundarraj
- Music by: Hamsalekha
- Production company: Rockline Productions
- Release date: 6 November 1998
- Running time: 144 minutes
- Country: India
- Language: Kannada

Preethsod Thappa (transl. 'Is it wrong to fall in love?') is a 1998 Indian Kannada-language romance drama film directed by Ravichandran and produced by Rockline Venkatesh. The film stars Ravichandran and Shilpa Shetty (in her Sandalwood debut). Lokesh and Lakshmi and Prakash Raj feature in other prominent roles. The film is a remake of the Telugu film Ninne Pelladata (1996).

== Plot ==
The film opens with Raja competing in a motorcycle race, where he overcomes every obstacle and emerges victorious. He lives with his parents, Sathya and Mahalakshmi, alongside a ight-knit extended family that includes his paternal and maternal uncles. Bound by deep affection, they all live together harmoniously as one big happy family.

Chandana lives in Mangalore with her parents and two younger sisters. She wants to pursue pilot training in Bangalore and shifts to Raja's house and stays as a guest. Chandana and Raja's family bond well together. Raja and Chandana gradually fall in love.

After discovering that Chandana stays in Sathya's house, her father takes her back with him. In the flashback, it is revealed that Chandana's mother Bhavani is Sathya's sister who married Chandana's father against Sathya's wish. Enraged, Sathya had tried to kill Chandana's father. Back in the present, we see men of both families holding grudges against each other. Chandana's father fixes her marriage with another man. Chandana, who feels that Raja could not prevent the marriage, consumes poison. But Raja comes to her house, beats all the goons hired by her father, and escapes from there with her. Chandana, due to consuming poison, vomits blood. She is hospitalized. The families wait outside the operating theatre. They ultimately realize their mistake, forgive each other, and happily agree to Raja and Chandana's marriage. In the end, Chandana comes out of the operating theatre healed and hugs Raja.

== Cast ==
- V. Ravichandran as Raja
- Shilpa Shetty as Chandana
- Prakash Raj as Chandana's father
- Lokesh as Sathya
- Lakshmi as Mahalakshmi
- Srinivasa Murthy as Murthy
- Doddanna as Puttaswamy
- Vinaya Prasad as Bhavani
- Ramakrishna as Hari
- Umashree as Uma
- Ramesh Bhat as Vasu
- Y. Vijaya as Vijaya
- Suchitra
- Jayashree Raj
- Tennis Krishna as Tennis
- Mandeep Roy
- Adarsha
- Shivadhwaj as Shivu

== Soundtrack ==
All the songs are composed and written by Hamsalekha. This was the last film with Hamsalekha - Ravichandran combination before they parted ways due to the differences in opinion. Music Magazine wrote "Hamsalekha's wit, his ability to rhyme the most unlikely words, and his flair for simple, catchy tunes come together in this tape".

Sl No	Song title	Singer(s)
1	"Bangaradinda Bannana"	K. J. Yesudas, Anuradha Sriram
2	"Sone Sone"	K. J. Yesudas, Anuradha Sriram
3	"Ondu Moda"	L. N. Shastry, Anuradha Sriram
4	"Dingu Dingu Dinguda"	Malgudi Shubha, Anuradha Sriram, Umashree, Suma Shastry, Ramesh Chandra
5	"Raja Raja"	Anuradha Sriram
6	"Made in India"	Chorus
7	"Choriyagide Nanna Dil"	S. P. Balasubrahmanyam, K. S. Chithra

== Reception ==
Jyothi Raghuram of The Hindu wrote, "As a remake, what is special about ‘Preethsod Thappa” is the excellent colour sense in which the film revels in, besides its technical excellence." Srikanth Srinivasa of Deccan Herald opined that that the story was "predictable" and that it was "...nothing new". He commended the acting performance of Lakshmi and the camerawork of G. S. V. Seetharam.
