= Dingri Nagaraj =

Indian Kannada actor

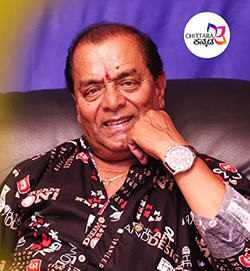
- Nagaraj in 2020
- Born: Nagaraj; 6 June 1948 (age 78); Bangalore, Dominion of India
- Occupation: Actor
- Years active: 1954–present
- Spouse(s): Sarvamangala; Mala
- Children: 2 (Including Raja Vardan)

Dingri Nagaraj (born 6 June 1948) is an Indian actor who works primarily in Kannada cinema, stage and television. He is known for his portrayal of comedic characters. He received praise for his roles in films such as Solillada Saradara (1992), Dore (1995) and Bangarada Kalasha (1995). He has appeared in a total of more than 600 Kannada-language films, and is a recipient of awards such as the Kempegowda Award and Karnataka Nataka Academy Award. He has served as president of the Kannada Supporting Artists Association.

== Early life ==
Nagaraj was born into a Telugu-speaking family in Bangalore. His father, Keshav Naidu, was a school teacher and mother, Sharadamma, a homemaker. He has an older sister, Ranganayaki. His mother died soon after his birth. Nagaraj was homeschooled till he reached class seven, before he joined Arya Vidya Shala in the city where he reached his matriculation. Influenced by his father who took to acting in the early 1950s, Nagaraj too joined Subbaiah Naidu's theatre group and began performing in plays such as Sri Jagajyothi Basaveshwara, Bhaktha Kumbara and Bedara Kannappa as a child actor.

== Career ==
In 1954, Nagaraj joined Gubbi Veeranna's group, following his father, where he acted in plays such as Lava Kusha. While there, he shared stage with future film actors and his colleagues, Dr. Rajkumar and Leelavathi. He was given the name nickname Dingri here by a set designer, after one of the characters in the 1951 Telugu-language film Pathala Bhairavi. Upon failing to clear the matriculation examination, Nagaraj decided to pursue acting fulltime and joined another theatre group, Hirannaiah Mitra Mandali, led and run by Master Hirannaiah, in 1966.

In 1969, Nagaraj began working at the Indian Telephone Industries Limited, where he met Maruthi Shivaram, who cast him in his film, Parasangada Gendethimma (1978), which would be the former's film debut as an actor. He also served as production assistant on the sets of the film. After the choreographer failed to show up, Nagaraj filled in for him, starting with the picturization of "Thera Eri Ambaradaage", and later, the remaining song sequences. Nagaraj appeared in a supporting role along the lead, Lokesh. The film proved to be a commercial success, and Nagaraj won praise for his performance. K. V. Jayaram, the assistant director of the film, then cast him his directorial, Maralu Sarpani. He would go on to work with other directors such as V. Somashekhar, D. Rajendra Babu and Rajendra Singh Babu. Producer Abbaiah Naidu first hired Nagaraj as a dubbing artist, and would then frequently cast him as an actor in his films. During this period, Nagaraj fell in love with another dubbing artist, Sarvamangala. The two married and have a daughter together.

Nagaraj went on to appear in comedic roles on films such as Mutthu Ondu Mutthu (1979), Anupama (1981), Chellida Rakta (1982), Thayiya Nudi (1983), Khaidi (1984), Maneye Manthralaya (1986), Thaliya Aane (1987), Namma Oora Devathe (1987), Olavina Aasare (1988) and Bombat Raja Bandal Rani (1994). In 1985, he founded a theatre group, the Dingri Nagaraj Nataka Mandali. In an interview with Deccan Herald in 2020, Nagaraj recalled, "I was lucky to portray varied characters, from a constable to a beggar. I never prepared for any character, it was always spontaneous." He cited Narasimharaju and N. S. Rao as his influences.

After divorcing Sarvamangala, Nagaraj married Mala. They have one son, Raja Vardan, who is also an actor.

== Selected filmography ==
Some notable films Nagaraj has appeared in include:

=== Films ===
- Parasangada Gendethimma (1978)
- Mutthu Ondu Mutthu (1979)
- Anupama (1981)...Dingri
- Prachanda Putanigalu (1981)
- Chellida Rakta (1982)
- Baadada Hoo (1982)...Mylari
- Thayiya Nudi (1983)
- Avala Neralu (1983)
- Khaidi (1984)
- Shiva Kotta Sowbhagya (1985)
- Maneye Manthralaya (1986)
- Thaliya Aane (1987)
- Namma Oora Devathe (1987)
- Huli Hebbuli (1987)
- Olavina Aasare (1988)
- Narasimha (1989)...Golur Gundappa
- Parashuram (1989)
- Chapala Chennigaraya (1990)...Peon
- Tiger Gangu (1990)
- Jagadeka Veera (1991)
- Bombat Hendthi (1992)
- Mallige Hoove (1992)
- Solillada Saradara (1992)...Tippeshi
- Ganesha Subramanya (1992)
- Rajadhi Raja (1992)
- Mane Devru (1993)
- Bombat Raja Bandal Rani (1994)
- Gold Medal (1994)...Nagaraja
- Lockup Death (1994)...Jaagate
- Gandhada Gudi Part 2 (1994)
- Ellaranthalla Nanna Ganda (1997)...Nagaraj
- Bhanda Alla Bahadur (1997)
- Ninne Preethisuve (2002)
- Naari Munidare Gandu Paraari (2004)
- Ajju (2004)
- Sagari (2004)
- Srusti (2004)
- Neelakanta (2006)
- Venkata in Sankata (2009)
- Naariya Seere Kadda (2010)
- Uyyale (2011)
- Crazy Star (2014)
- Karodpathi (2014)
- CBI Sathya (2016)
- Mukunda Murari (2016)...priest
- Olave Mandara 2 (2023)
- Kaatera (2023)
- Rana Haddu (2024)
- Puneeth Nivasa (2026)

=== Television ===
- Gowripurada Gayyaligalu (2021)
- Sundari (2021–2022)
- Kadambari (2021)
- Avanu Matte Shravani (2023–present)
