= N. Veeraswamy =

Indian film producer (1932–1992)

N. Veeraswamy Mudaliar
- Born: Nagappa Veeraswamy Mudaliar; 17 April 1932; Otteri, North Arcot, Madras Presidency, British India
- Died: 23 August 1992 (aged 60)
- Occupations: Film producer, distributor
- Years active: 1955–1992
- Spouse: Pattammal
- Children: 5; including V. Ravichandran

Nagappa Veeraswamy Mudaliar (17 April 1932 – 23 August 1992) was an Indian film producer and distributor, who produced under the house, Sri Eswari Productions. He produced 17 Kannada films and one Hindi film, from the early 1970s till his death in 1992. He is the father of Kannada film star and director V. Ravichandran.

== Early life and career ==
Veeraswamy was born on 17 April 1932 in Otteri, in the erstwhile North Arcot district of Madras Presidency, into a Tamil-speaking family of Nagappa Mudaliar and Kamakshamma.

He began his association with cinema in the early 1950s when he worked as an attendant with Dreamland Pictures Corporation. In 1955, he started out as a film distributor with his friend Gangappa, under the banner Udaya Pictures. In 1962, he founded the production house Sri Eswari Productions. The first film under the company, Kula Gourava, was released in 1971, and had Rajkumar playing the lead role. The two subsequent films, Naagarahaavu (1972) and Bhootayyana Maga Ayyu (1974), became widely popular and emerged as critical and commercial successes.

Veeraswamy would go on to produce other films that emerged successful, such as Naa Ninna Mareyalare (1976), Chakravyuha (1983), Ramachaari (1991) and Halli Meshtru (1992). The latter two films were produced with his son V. Ravichandran playing the lead roles; they went on to become landmark films in latter's career.

== Filmography ==
=== Kannada ===
- Kula Gourava (1971)
- Naagarahaavu (1972)
- Bhootayyana Maga Ayyu (1974)
- Ninagagi Naanu (1975)
- Naa Ninna Mareyalare (1976)
- Hemavathi (1977)
- Bhoolokadalli Yamaraja (1979)
- Narada Vijaya (1980)
- Nari Swargakke Daari (1981)
- Chakravyuha (1983)
- Pralayanthaka (1984)
- Savira Sullu (1985)
- Naanu Nanna Hendthi (1985)
- Premaloka (1987)
- Kindari Jogi (1989)
- Ramachaari (1991)
- Shanti Kranti (1991)
- Halli Meshtru (1992)
- Gopi Krishna (1992)

=== Hindi ===
- Inquilaab (1984)

=== Tamil ===
- Padikkadavan (1985)
