= Padikkadavan (1985 film) =

- Theatrical release poster
- Directed by: Rajasekhar
- Story by: Kader Khan
- Produced by: N. Veeraswamy; Ravichandran
- Starring: Sivaji Ganesan; Rajinikanth; Jaishankar; Ambika; Ramya Krishnan
- Cinematography: V. Ranga
- Edited by: R. Vittal; S. B. Mohan
- Music by: Ilaiyaraaja
- Production company: Sri Eswari Productions
- Release date: 11 November 1985
- Country: India
- Language: Tamil
- Box office: est. ₹5.5 crore

Padikkadavan (transl. Uneducated Man) is a 1985 Indian Tamil-language action drama film, starring Sivaji Ganesan, Rajinikanth and Ambika. It is directed by Rajasekhar. The film was produced by Kannada actor Ravichandran along with his father N. Veeraswamy. It is a remake of the Hindi film Khud-Daar (1982).

The story is about a man who strives hard to make his younger brother study. The two brothers are the step-brothers of Rajasekhar. The younger brother of Rajendran after distressing from him finally joins with him. All three of them finally join after certain conviction regarding a death. It was released on 11 November 1985 and became a major commercial success by running for 250 days in theatres across Tamil Nadu. It reestablished Rajinikanth as box office king and he also established more fanbase in rural areas.

== Plot ==
Rajasekhar is the loving elder stepbrother of Rajendran aka Raja and Ramachandran aka Ramu. After his marriage, his wife Radha ousts Raja and Ramu from home while he is away. After some struggle, the two young brothers are adopted by Rahim. Raja, the older of the two, toils and becomes a taxi driver to educate his brother. As a taxi driver, he does what is right, such as stopping drug dealers. There, he meets Mary, a girl who smuggles drugs and alcohol while pretending to be pregnant. After sometime, she has a change of heart, and she and Raja fall in love.

Ramu, whom Raja believes to be an innocent person, strays and gets mixed up with some wrong-doers. He marries a girl named Manju, who is from a wealthy family, and later severs his ties with Raja when Raja discovers that he lied about passing an examination (when actually, he failed in the examination) and confronts him. Meanwhile, Manju's maternal uncle Chakravarthy is a smuggler who sells drugs using his older brother Vedhachalam's lorries. Chakravarthy later kills Vedhachalam, and frames Raja for the crime. Rajasekhar, the presiding judge for the case, realises that Raja & Ramu are his long-lost brothers. He then proceeds to have a heart attack & adjourns the court. He then researches all night, returns as a defence lawyer to save Raja and successfully proves that Chakravarthy is the one who murdered his own brother. A fight ensues between Chakravarthy and Raja, where Raja defeats Chakravarthy. In the end, Radha apologises for her old attitude with Raja and Ramu.

== Cast ==
- Sivaji Ganesan as Rajasekhar
- Rajinikanth as Rajendran
- Jaishankar as Chakravarthy
- Ambika as Mary
- Ramya Krishnan as Manju
- Vijay Babu as Ramachandran
- Vadivukkarasi as Radha, Rajasekhar's wife
- Nagesh as Rahim
- Poornam Viswanathan as Vedhachalam
- Thengai Srinivasan as Ramanathan
- Janagaraj as Kabali Alais K.Bali
- Senthamarai as Advocate
- Indira as Faritha
- Gundu Kalyanam as Vathalagundu Vasu
- Rangammal
- Master Suresh

== Soundtrack ==
The music was composed by Ilaiyaraaja. The song "Oorai Therinchikitten" is set to the raga Keeravani.

Song	Singers	Lyrics	Length
"Jodi Kili"	S. P. Balasubrahmanyam, S. Janaki	Vairamuthu	05:00
"Oorai Therinchikitten"	K. J. Yesudas	Vairamuthu	04:07
"Oru Koottu"	Malaysia Vasudevan	Vairamuthu	03:45
"Rajavukku Raja"	S. P. Balasubrahmanyam	Vaali	04:32
"Solli Adipenadi"	Malaysia Vasudevan, S. Janaki	Gangai Amaran	04:29

== Reception ==
Jayamanmadhan (a duo) of Kalki praised Rajinikanth for his fight scenes, Ganesan for controlled acting, Ilaiyaraaja's music as melodious with praise directed towards the song "Oorai Therinjukitten" for its tune, lyrics and picturisation but felt Ambika was there only for glamour. The duo concluded the review saying due to the presence of Rajinikanth, the film looks brighter and also added the film which is backed up by great music, strong story will satisfy all audiences and the film will easily succeed. Ananda Vikatan wrote that although is a simple masala story, director Rajasekhar should be applauded for giving a quality entertainment film with Ganesan quietly and Rajinikanth aggressively, though the critic felt the final dialogue was artificial. NKS of The Indian Express praised Rajasekhar's direction for infusing life and idealism into the film despite being a commercial film while also appreciating the acting of cast, music and production values but found fights to be the only drawback.
