= Preethsu Thappenilla =

- VCD cover
- Directed by: V. S. Reddy
- Written by: A. Karunakaran
- Based on: Tholi Prema (Telugu)(1998)
- Produced by: G. V. G. Raju
- Starring: V. Ravichandran; Rachana Banerjee; Nagesh; Suman Nagarkar
- Cinematography: G. S. V. Seetharam
- Edited by: Shyam Yadav
- Music by: V. Ravichandran
- Production company: S S C Arts
- Release date: 12 May 2000
- Running time: 142 minutes
- Country: India
- Language: Kannada

Preethsu Thappenilla (transl. Nothing Wrong with Falling in Love) is a 2000 Indian Kannada-language romantic comedy film directed by V. S. Reddy and produced by GVG Raju. The film stars V. Ravichandran, Rachana Banerjee and Nagesh in the leading roles.

The film was a remake of Telugu film Tholi Prema (1998) directed by A. Karunakaran which won the National Film Award for Best Feature Film in Telugu. The music was composed and lyrics written by Ravichandran.

== Cast ==
- V. Ravichandran as Balu
- Rachana Banerjee as Anu
- Suman Nagarkar as Priya
- Srinivasa Murthy
- Nagesh as Balu's uncle
- K. S. Ashwath
- Sadhu Kokila
- Tennis Krishna
- Mandya Ramesh
- Avinash
- Chitra Shenoy
- Bhavyasri Rai
- Bullet Prakash

== Soundtrack ==
The music was composed and lyrics written by V. Ravichandran. A total of five tracks have been composed for the film and the audio rights brought by Lahari Music.

All tracks are written by V. Ravichandran.

Track listing
No.	Title	Singer(s)	Length
1.	"Oho Tirupathi Thimmappa"	Suresh Peters, L. N. Shastry
2.	"Hehe Oho"	S. P. Balasubrahmanyam, Ramesh Chandra, L. N. Shastry, Suma Shastry
3.	"Nee Yaarele"	Hariharan
4.	"I Love You Feeling"	S. P. Balasubrahmanyam, Malgudi Subha
5.	"Oh Nannavalu Green Signal"	S. P. Balasubrahmanyam, Suma Shastry

== Reception ==
Indiainfo wrote "Good performance, photography and foot-tapping music go a long way in making this movie a good family entertainer. It is definitely worth a dekko. Director V S Reddy, who has successfully tried a series of subjects in Telugu and Tamil, has done his job well. If one ignores the regular ingredients, this film, a remake of Telugu hit Tholi Prema, on the whole is an entertaining film". Go4i wrote "A remake of Telugu hit Tholi Prema, the film is very interesting in bits and pieces, specially being a clean straightforward entertainer, it makes for great entire family viewing".
