= Neelakanta (film) =

- DVD cover
- Directed by: Om Sai Prakash
- Based on: Aranmanai Kili by Rajkiran
- Produced by: K. Bala Muttaiah
- Starring: V. Ravichandran; Namitha; Sridevika
- Cinematography: G. S. V. Seetharam
- Edited by: S. Manohar
- Music by: V. Ravichandran
- Production company: Sri Dhanalakshmi Creations
- Release date: 22 December 2006
- Running time: 153 minutes
- Country: India
- Language: Kannada

Neelakanta is a 2006 Indian Kannada language romantic drama film directed by Om Sai Prakash and starring V. Ravichandran, Namitha and Sridevika. It is a remake of the Tamil film Aranmanai Kili (1993). The music was composed by Ravichandran.

== Plot ==
The film has shades from his film 'Usire' which is a Telugu film.

Just as lord Shiva swallows the fearful poison Halahala and, with the help of his wife Parvati, neutralises it in his throat, so the protagonist of 'Neelakanta' swallows all the difficulties that beset him on his way, in order to remain obedient to his Master, his Mother and his wife, Madadhi. Neelakanta can give solution to any problems of his surroundings but he goes blank for his own problems. His mother disagrees to his accidental marriage and asks him not to see her face. On the other hand, his wife on compulsion suspects Neelanakanta to the extreme. That is because of Ganga in the house who has been brought to the house in her most difficult condition by Neelakanta. With no happiness around for him Neelakanta problems slowly dilute when his mother narrate the past of Neelakanta's master. How his wife Ganga changes her track, what happens to Gowri, the sad end of mother and Neelakanta not able to see his mother, the putting down of goons in the meantime are all the remaining portions in the second half.

== Cast ==
- V. Ravichandran as Neelakanta
- Namitha
- Sridevika
- Sujatha
- Umashri
- Avinash
- Lambu Nagesh
- Sanketh Kashi
- Sadhu Kokila
- Ramesh Bhat
- M.N Lakshmi Devi
- Vijay Kashi
- Ashalatha
- Muniraj

== Soundtrack ==
The music was composed and lyrics written by V. Ravichandran.

Track listing
No.	Title	Lyrics	Singer(s)	Length
1.	"Hennige Seere Yaake Anda"	V. Ravichandran	Srinivas, Suma Shastry
2.	"Ammammmamo"	V. Ravichandran	S. P. Balasubrahmanyam, Nanditha
3.	"Malla Malla Malla"	V. Ravichandran	Chaitra H. G.
4.	"Devaru Bareda Katheyali"	V. Ravichandran	S. P. Balasubrahmanyam, Nanditha
5.	"Andada Bombege"	V. Ravichandran	S. P. Balasubrahmanyam
6.	"Devaru Bareda (sad)"	V. Ravichandran	S. P. Balasubrahmanyam
