= Pandu Ranga Vittala =

- Title card
- Directed by: Dinesh Baboo
- Screenplay by: Dinesh Babu
- Story by: V. Vijayendra Prasad
- Produced by: A Ganesh; Narayan J
- Starring: V. Ravichandran; Prema; Rambha; Shruti
- Cinematography: Dinesh Babu
- Edited by: Sanjeev Reddy
- Music by: V. Ravichandran
- Production company: Mega Hit Productions
- Release date: 30 December 2005 (India)
- Country: India
- Language: Kannada

Pandu Ranga Vittala is a 2005 Indian Kannada-language romantic comedy film written and directed by Dinesh Baboo from a story by V. Vijayendra Prasad. The film stars V. Ravichandran (who also composed the music), Prema, Rambha and Shruti in lead roles.

== Plot ==
Vithala escapes on the day of his marriage and runs into the city. He faces various situations in the city and as a result, marries two other girls under pseudonyms - Pandu (innocent) and Ranga (Mechanic). In between, his villagers come to the city to find Vithal to bring back to the village. Vithal escapes from everyone by using his pseudonym characters. The rest of the story is about how he solves the situation.

== Cast ==
- V. Ravichandran as Vithala alias Pandu alias Ranga
- Prema
- Rambha
- Shruti
- Avinash
- Tara
- Mukhyamantri Chandru
- Ramesh Bhat
- Doddanna
- Karibasavaiah
- Bank Janardhan
- Mandya Ramesh
- M. S. Umesh
- Mandeep Roy
- Sanjjanaa Galrani
- Ashalatha
- Padmini
- Junglee Prasanna
- Master Arun
- Om Prakash Rao

== Production ==
The film originally began production in 2003 with D. Rajendra Babu as director who later left the film due to differences with Ravichandran and producers.

== Soundtrack ==
The music was composed by the lead actor Ravichandran who also wrote all the lyrics.

Track listing
| No. | Title | Singer(s) | Length |
|---|---|---|---|
| 1. | "Aha Sexy Lady" | Karthik, Nanditha Rakesh | 3:22 |
| 2. | "Raama Naama Paayasakke" | Srinivas, Anuradha Sriram | 4:43 |
| 3. | "Bangadi Meenu" | Mano, K. S. Chithra | 5:12 |
| 4. | "Muttu Muttu Muttu Baa" | K. S. Chithra, Hemanth Kumar | 3:41 |
| 5. | "Odi Hogona Baa Anthale" | L. N. Shastri, Suma Shastry | 4:46 |
| 6. | "Thattu Thattu Thattu Baa" | Hemanth Kumar, K. S. Chithra | 3:29 |
| 7. | "Aha Sexy Lady" (Reprise) | Karthik, Nanditha Rakesh | 3:22 |
| Total length: | | | 28:15 |

== Reception ==
Deccan Herald wrote "The film, with a direct narrative, is a typical Ravichandran film with colourful songs, romance, comic and action sequences which largely appeal to galleries". Sify wrote "This romantic entertainer is a painful experience".
