= Shankar Nag filmography =

Shankar Nag was an Indian film actor, director, screenwriter and producer known for his work in Kannada cinema. He directed seven Kannada films and one Marathi film. He also wrote the story and screenplay of many of these including a few films that he did not direct. After beginning his acting career in theatre, Nag took to films making his debut in a bit role in the 1978 Marathi anti-superstition drama Sarvasakshi. His Kannada film debut came in the same year with Ondanondu Kaladalli directed by Girish Karnad, in which Nag played the lead, a mercenary named Gandugali. The role that fetched him the Silver Peacock for the Best Actor Award (Male) at the 7th International Film Festival of India. Other than Minchina Ota, he also co-produced two of his directorial ventures — Janma Janmada Anubandha (1980) and Geetha (1981).

Nag co-wrote the 1979 Marathi film 22 June 1897 with director Nachiket Patwardhan. His directorial debut came in the heist film Minchina Ota (1980), a film that he also wrote and starred in, alongside brother Anant Nag. Anant would go on to become a frequent collaborator. Shankar remade Minchina Ota in Hindi as Lalach (1983). He would go on to direct six other films, all in Kannada, most notably the crime-drama Accident (1985), that highlighted a nexus between the media and the political system. The film won the National Film Award for Best Film on Other Social Issues at the 32nd National Film Awards. His last film as a director was Ondu Muttina Kathe (1987), based on the John Steinbeck's novella The Pearl, that starred Dr. Rajkumar. Nag shot to national fame with the television series Malgudi Days (1986–1988) that he directed, based on R. K. Narayan's collection of short stories of the same name.

As an actor, Nag made his first appearance in a commercial film with Seetharamu (1979). His role as Raja, the auto rikshaw driver in Auto Raja (1980), became widely popular, and continues to hold cult status in Karnataka. The 1980s saw Nag appearing most notably in action thrillers and rogue cop films with plenty of martial arts posturing, earning him the moniker "Karate King". In Sangliyana (1988) and S. P. Sangliyana Part 2 (1990), he played the eponymous lead, based on the real-life cop H. T. Sangliana. C.B.I. Shankar (1989) is another film in the same genre. Films such as Muniyana Madari (1981), Karmika Kallanalla (1982), Nodi Swamy Navirodu Hige (1983) and Lorry Driver (1987) saw him portray working-class men. In the ensemble Hindi film Utsav (1984), he played a thief who falls in love with a courtesan. Nag last filmed for Sundarakanda (1991) which released after his death by car crash in 1990.

== Film ==
List of directing and writing credits
Year	Title	Director	Screenwriter	Notes	Ref(s)
1979	22 June 1897	No	Yes	Marathi film	
1980	Minchina Ota	Yes	Yes		
1980	Janma Janmada Anubandha	Yes	Yes		
1981	Geetha	Yes	Yes		
1983	Lalach	Yes	Yes	Hindi film	
1983	Hosa Theerpu	Yes	Yes		
1983	Nodi Swamy Navirodu Hige	Yes	Yes		
1984	Accident	Yes	No		
1984	Makkaliralavva Mane Thumba	No	Yes		
1985	Parameshi Prema Prasanga	No	Yes		
1987	Ondu Muttina Kathe	Yes	Yes		

=== Acting roles ===
List of acting credits
Year	Title	Role	Notes	Ref(s)
1978	Sarvasakshi	Sujatha's husband	Marathi film	
1978	Ondanondu Kaladalli	Gandugali	Silver Peacock for the Best Actor Award (Male)	
1979	Seetharamu	Ramu		
1979	Preethi Madu Thamashe Nodu	Ravi		
1979	Madhu Chandra	Madhu		
1979	I Love You	Ramesh		
1980	Minchina Ota	Katte	Playback singer for "Belli Moda Hatthuttha"	
1980	Auto Raja	Raja		
1980	Moogana Sedu	Nagaraju/Ashok Raj (Note: Nag played dual roles in the film.)		
1980	Haddina Kannu	Vikram		
1980	Ondu Hennu Aaru Kannu	Vijay		
1980	Aarada Gaaya	Mohan		
1980	Rusthum Jodi	Shekhar		
1980	Janma Janmada Anubandha	Shiva Achari		
1981	Thayiya Madilalli	Ravi	Special appearance	
1981	Kula Puthra	Mahesh		
1981	Hanabalavo Janabalavo			
1981	Geetha	Sanjay		
1981	Devara Aata	Anand		
1981	Bhaari Bharjari Bete	Tyaga		
1981	Muniyana Madari	Muniya		
1981	Jeevakke Jeeva	Jaggu "Raja"		
1982	Archana	Raja	Special appearance	
1982	Benki Chendu	Kodanda		
1982	Karmika Kallanalla	Sudhakar		
1982	Nyaya Ellide	Vijay		
1982	Dharma Daari Tappithu	Krishna	Cameo	
1983	Gedda Maga	Arun/Alex /John (Note: Nag played triple roles in the film.)	Triple role	
1983	Nyaya Gedditu	Anand		
1983	Chandi Chamundi	Shankar		
1983	Keralida Hennu	Suresh Kumar		
1983	Aakrosha	Vijay		
1983	Nodi Swamy Navirodu Hige	Mysore Matha		
1983	Swargadalli Maduve		Cameo	
1984	Nagabekamma Nagabeku	Ramu		
1984	Raktha Thilaka	Gopi	Playback singer for "Enaguvudu"	
1984	Gandu Bherunda	Nayar		
1984	Thaliya Bhagya	Raja		
1984	Benki Birugali	Shankar		
1984	Kalinga Sarpa	Kalinga		
1984	Indina Bharatha	Arjun		
1984	Bedaru Bombe			
1984	Shapatha	Ranga		
1984	Pavithra Prema	Chandrashekhar		
1984	Accident	Ravi		
1984	Asha Kirana	Kiran		
1984	Apoorva Sangama	Harish/Suresh		
1984	Makkaliralavva Mane Thumba	Shankar	Cameo	
1984	Utsav	Sajjal	Hindi film	
1985	Thayi Kanasu	Murthy		
1985	Parameshi Prema Prasanga	Parameshi		
1985	Manava Danava	H. Mahesh/Tiger	Double role	
1985	Kiladi Aliya	Kumar		
1985	Vajra Mushti	Ajay		
1985	Kari Naga			
1986	Na Ninna Preetisuve		Special appearance	
1986	Thayiye Nanna Devaru	Shekhar		
1986	Agni Parikshe	Raja		
1986	Rasthe Raja	Raja		
1986	Samsarada Guttu	Ramsagar		
1987	Thayi	Ravi		
1987	Ee Bandha Anubandha	Vijay		
1987	Huli Hebbuli	Inspector Ajay		
1987	Digvijaya	DCP Chandrashekhar		
1987	Lorry Driver	Shankar		
1987	Anthima Ghatta	Anil		
1988	Shakthi	Ramu		
1988	Sangliyana	Ram/Inspector Sangliyana (Note: Nag played one character with two names.)	Playback singer for "Raja Nanna Raja"	
1988	Dharmathma			
1988	Mithileya Seetheyaru	Inspector Sharif	Cameo	
1989	Tarka	Akshay/Harish		
1989	Mahayuddha			
1989	Anthintha Gandu Nanalla	Ajay		
1989	C.B.I. Shankar	Sathya/Shankar		
1989	Idu Saadhya	Theatre director		
1989	Rajasimha	Raja		
1989	Jayabheri	Mohan		
1989	Narasimha	Sridhar/Narasimha		
1990	S. P. Sangliyana Part 2	S. P. Sangliyana		
1990	Ramarajyadalli Rakshasaru	Inspector Chandrashekhar		
1990	Maheshwara	Maheshwara/ Paramesh		
1990	Thrinethra	SP Sangliyana	Cameo	
1990	Aavesha	Shivappa		
1990	Hosa Jeevana	Seetharam		
1990	Halliya Surasuraru	Shankar		
1990	Bhale Chathura	Shekhar		
1990	Aata Bombata	Raja		
1990	Nigooda Rahasya	Mohan	Posthumous release	
1991	Nakkala Rajakumari	Sorcerer	Posthumous release	
1991	Punda Prachanda	Purushotham	Posthumous release	
1991	Nagini	Shankar	Posthumous release	
1991	Sundarakanda	Inspector Shetty	Posthumous release	
1992	Prana Snehitha	Ram	Posthumous release	

== Television ==
Year	Title	Role	Language	Notes	Ref(s)
1986–1988	Malgudi Days	Venkatesh	Hindi; English	Also director	
