= Anant Nag filmography =

Anant Nag

Anant Nag is an Indian actor and occasional film producer who appears as an actor in predominantly in Kannada films and a few Hindi and Telugu films. In a career spanning over 5 decades, he has appeared in over 270 films. After having had a successful theatre career, he made his debut in P. V. Nanjaraja Urs' Kannada film Sankalpa, and Shyam Benegal's Dakhani film Ankur, with the former seeing theatrical release first, in 1973, and won multiple awards at the 1972–73 Karnataka State Film Awards. In G. V. Iyer's 1975 film Hamsageethe, he played the role of Bhairavi Venkatasubbiah, a performance that won critical praise, and the film was awarded the Best Feature Film in Kannada at the 23rd National Film Awards.

Nag went on to appear as a parallel lead alongside leading actors during the time such as Ambareesh and Rajinikanth in the second half of the 1970s. The year 1980 saw the first collaboration of his with his brother Shankar Nag, who appeared as a parallel lead and the director of Minchina Ota. The former's performance won him his first Karnataka State Film Award for Best Actor. They further worked together in the latter's directorial films Janma Janmada Anubandha (1980), Nodi Swamy Navirodu Hige (1985) and Accident (1985). The brothers worked together for the last time in Shankar's 1987 directorial hugely popular television series Malgudi Days, based on a collection of short stories of the same name by R. K. Narayan, in 1987 that aired on Doordarshan. Nag also became known for his collaboration with Benegal following Ankur in films such as Nishant (1975), Manthan (1976), Kondura (1978) and Kalyug (1981). The lead pair of Nag and actress Lakshmi became widely popular in the 1970s and 1980s after they appeared in popular films such as Chandanada Gombe (1979), Naa Ninna Bidalaare (1979) and Makkaliralavva Mane Thumba (1984) among many others. His performances in Hosa Neeru (1986), Avasthe (1987) and Gangavva Gangamayi (1994) won him three more Best Actor awards at the Karnataka State Film Awards. The decade of 1990s saw him appearing in comic roles and established this image of his with films such as Ganeshana Maduve (1990), Golmaal Radhakrishna (1990), Gauri Ganesha (1991). His second stint in television came in the 2002 Kannada soap opera Garva. He went on to appear in Preeti Illada Mele (2006), Chitte Hejje (2013), Nithyotsava (2013) and Lottery (2013).

In the second half of 1990s, Nag began appearing predominantly in supporting roles and this continued till K.G.F: Chapter 1 (2018). The period saw him win multiple nominations and awards at various film awards including the Filmfare Awards South. In recognition of his contribution towards Kannada cinema, the Government of Karnataka honoured with the Dr. Vishnuvardhan Award in 2013.

== Kannada films ==
Key
†	Denotes films that have not yet been released

Year	Film	Role	Notes	Ref.
1973	Sankalpa	Dr. Raju		
1975	Devara Kannu	Dr. Anand		
1975	Hamsageethe	Bhairavi Venkatasubbiah		
1976	Bayalu Daari	Gopi		
1977	Kanneshwara Rama	Rama		
1977	Anuroopa	Shankar		
1978	Kudure Mukha	Mohan		
1978	Maathu Tappada Maga	Kumar		
1978	Sandharbha		Cameo	
1978	Premayana	Mohan		
1978	Madhura Sangama	Dr. Prasanna		
1979	Naa Ninna Bidalaare	Krishna	Filmfare Award for Best Actor – Kannada	
1979	Chandanada Gombe	Seetharamu		
1979	Mutthu Ondu Mutthu	Dr. Madhukar		
1980	Minchina Ota	Tony D'Souza	Karnataka State Film Award for Best Actor	
1980	Dhairya Lakshmi	Ramesh		
1980	Ondu Hennu Aaru Kannu	Ajay		
1980	Narada Vijaya	Narada/Vijay	Dual roles	
1980	Janma Janmada Anubandha	Avinash/Girish Achari	Also co-producer, screenwriter	
1980	Prema Jwala	Vishwa		
1981	Anupama	Ananth		
1981	Mareyada Haadu	Anand		
1981	Jeevakke Jeeva	Sagar		
1981	Shreeman	Raghu		
1982	Andada Aramane	Shivaraj		
1982	Baadada Hoo	Prasad		
1982	Mullina Gulabi	Mohan		
1982	Bara	Sathish Chandra	Filmfare Award for Best Actor – Kannada	
1982	Nanna Devaru	Gopal		
1982	Hasyaratna Ramakrishna	Tenali Ramakrishna		
1982	Betthale Seve	Dr. Paravappa		
1983	Simhasana	Arun		
1983	Anveshane	Shyam		
1983	Benkiya Bale	Narasimha Murthy		
1983	Gayathri Maduve	Ravi / Prakash	Dual role	
1983	Hosa Theerpu	Gopal Rao	Cameo appearance	
1983	Kaamana Billu	Chandra		
1983	Bhakta Prahlada	Narada	Special appearance	
1983	Phaniyamma		Cameo appearance	
1983	Ibbani Karagithu	Varun		
1983	Mududida Tavare Aralithu	Chandrashekhar		
1983	Chalisida Sagara			
1983	Nodi Swamy Navirodu Hige	Mysore Matha's brother	Cameo	
1983	Makkale Devaru	Anand		
1984	Sukha Samsarakke Hanneradu Sootragalu	Kumar		
1984	Premave Balina Belaku	Madhava		
1984	Prema Sakshi	Shankar		
1984	Ramapurada Ravana	Hanumanth Rao		
1984	Olave Baduku	Harsha	Also producer	
1984	Olavu Moodidaga			
1984	Makkaliralavva Mane Thumba	Rajashekhar	Also producer	
1985	Accident	Dharmadhikari		
1985	Bidugadeya Bedi	Shantaram		
1985	Parameshi Prema Prasanga	Papanna		
1985	Shwetha Gulabi	Rajiv		
1985	Haavu Eni Aata	Chandru		
1985	Sedina Hakki	Shankar		
1985	Shabdagalu	Shankar		
1985	Hendthi Beku Hendthi	Ramanand		
1986	Hosa Neeru	Krishnaprasad	Karnataka State Film Award for Best Actor	
1986	Nenapina Doni	Vasu		
1986	Prema Jala	Anand		
1986	Aruna Raaga	Sumesh		
1986	Maneye Manthralaya	Ramu		
1987	Thayi	Balarama		
1987	Huli Hebbuli	Lawyer Sriram	Cameo appearance	
1987	Agni Parva	Chakravarthy	Cameo appearance	
1987	Avasthe	Krishnappa Gowda	Karnataka State Film Award for Best Actor	
1987	Kurukshetra	Surya		
1987	Athiratha Maharatha	Chief Minister Vijaypratap		
1987	Daiva Shakti	Ramu		
1988	Brahma Vishnu Maheshwara	Inspector Mahesh		
1988	Ranadheera	Inspector Anand		
1988	Shanthi Nivasa			
1988	Varna Chakra			
1988	Sri Venkateshwara Mahime			
1988	Balondu Bhavageethe			
1988	Mutthaide			
1989	Amaanusha			
1989	Hendthighelbedi	Anand	Filmfare Award for Best Actor – Kannada	
1989	Idu Saadhya	Khyata / Karthik Kamplapur		
1989	Gagana	Raju		
1990	Golmaal Radhakrishna	Gopalakrishna		
1990	Ramarajyadalli Rakshasaru	Surya		
1990	Swarna Samsara	Sridhar		
1990	Challenge Gopalakrishna	Gopalakrishna		
1990	Udbhava	Raghavendra "Raghanna" Rao	Filmfare Award for Best Actor – Kannada	
1990	Abhimanyu	G. K. S Master		
1990	Mathe Haditu Kogile	Prasan Kumar		
1990	Anantha Prema	Ananth		
1990	Ganeshana Maduve	Ganesha		
1990	Ivalentha Hendthi			
1991	Maneli Ili Beedili Huli	G. Purushotham		
1991	Golmaal Part 2	Gopalakrishna		
1991	Rollcall Ramakrishna	Ramakrishna		
1991	Gowri Ganesha	Lambodara	Filmfare Award for Best Actor – Kannada	
1991	Hosa Mane Aliya			
1991	Shanti Kranti	Daddy		
1991	Nagini			
1992	Undu Hoda Kondu Hoda	Krishna		
1992	Vajrayudha			
1992	Ondu Cinema Kathe	Shyamsundar Kulkarni		
1992	Shakti Yukti			
1992	Marana Mrudanga			
1992	Jhenkaara			
1992	Ganesha Subramanya	Ganesha		
1993	Rajakeeya	Lawyer Siddartha		
1993	Aathanka	Raghu		
1993	Mangalya Bandhana	Vijay		
1993	Kadambari			
1993	Nishkarsha	Subhash, Police Commissioner		
1994	Thooguve Krishnana	Babu		
1994	Yarigu Helbedi	Govinda		
1994	Gangavva Gangamayi	Raaghappa	Karnataka State Film Award for Best Actor	
1995	Beladingala Baale	Revanth		
1995	Nilukada Nakshatra	Raja		
1996	Samayakkondu Sullu	Krishna		
1996	Thaali Pooje	Jagadish		
1996	Nirbandha	Chief Minister of Karnataka		
1996	Jeevanadhi	Harshavardhan		
1996	Anuraga Spandana	Raghuram		
1997	Ganesha I Love U	Ganesha		
1999	Vishwa	Vijay		
1999	Naanenu Madlilla	Ramachandra		
2000	Preethse	Vijay		
2000	Tiger Padmini			
2000	Krishna Leele			
2000	Chamundi			
2000	Yaarige Saluthe Sambala	Venkatagiri		
2000	Nan Hendthi Chennagidale	Ramu's Boss		
2000	Swalpa Adjust Madkolli	Vasudeva Rao		
2000	Andhra Hendthi			
2001	Mathadana	Ramalinge Gowda		
2001	Kurigalu Saar Kurigalu	Special Investigation Officer		
2001	Asura	Birla Bose		
2001	Aunty Preethse			
2001	Chitra	Ramu's father		
2001	Amma			
2001	Neela	Shivajja		
2001	Chitte	Shanthi's father		
2001	Hello Narada			
2002	Bhootayyana Makkalu			
2002	Manase O Manase			
2002	Manasella Neene	Editor-in-chief of magazine		
2002	Naanu Naane			
2002	Hollywood	Scientist K. D. Das		
2003	Ananda			
2003	Bangalore Bandh	Chief Minister of Karnataka		
2003	Lankesh Patrike	Lankesh		
2003	Preethi Prema Pranaya	Dr. Chandrashekar		
2003	Khushi	Rajendra Prasad		
2003	Chigurida Kanasu	B. Sundar Rao		
2003	Mouni	Appanna Bhatta		
2004	Sagari	Prof. Ramachandra		
2004	Mellusire Savigana			
2004	Bidalaare		Cameo	
2004	Pakkadamane Hudugi	Chakravarthy		
2004	Santhosha	Santhosh's father		
2005	Encounter Dayanayak	Prakash Hegde		
2005	Nenapirali	Ekanth's father		
2005	Vishnu Sena	Chief Minister of Karnataka		
2006	Shree			
2006	Uppi Dada M.B.B.S.	Dr. Ashok Kashyap		
2006	Neenello Naanalle	Santosh's father		
2006	Ravi Shastri	Narayana Dixit		
2006	Kallarali Hoovagi	Basavadeva "Basayya"		
2006	Mungaru Male	Colonel Subbayya		
2007	Sajni	Ananth Murthy		
2007	Nali Naliyutha	Srinivasa		
2007	Ninade Nenapu			
2007	Snehanjali			
2007	Ganesha	Rao Bahadur Shivaraj Patil		
2007	Ee Bandhana	Narayana Ullagaddi		
2008	Gaalipata	Kodandaram		
2008	Honganasu			
2008	Yuga Yugagale Saagali	Sashi's father		
2008	Aramane	Rajashekhar Aras	Nominated, Filmfare Award for Best Supporting Actor – Kannada	
2008	Super Jodi			
2008	Neene Neene	Rajasekhar		
2008	Taj Mahal	Narayan Murthy	Nominated, Filmfare Award for Best Supporting Actor – Kannada	
2008	Arjun	Jayasimharaja		
2008	Ganesha Matte Bandha	Padmanabhacharya		
2008	Ganga Kaveri	Arjun's father		
2009	Namyajamanru	Retd. Col. Hoovayya		
2009	Baaji			
2009	Ghauttham			
2009	Chellidaru Sampigeya	Swami Gowda		
2009	Eshtu Naguthi Nagu			
2009	Cheluvina Chilipili			
2009	Huchchi			
2009	Mr. Garagasa	Parthasarthy		
2010	Crazy Kutumba	Mallanagowda Patil		
2010	Premism			
2010	Mr. Theertha	Narayana Shastri		
2010	Eradane Maduve	Vishwanath		
2010	Olave Vismaya			
2010	Preethi Hangama	Raj's father		
2010	Pancharangi	A wanderer		
2010	Rame Gowda vs Krishna Reddy	Subbanna		
2011	Kalgejje			
2011	Take It Easy			
2011	Mathond Madhuvena	Vishwanath		
2011	Bhramara			
2011	Paramathma	Jayanth		
2011	Naanalla	Subash Chandra Prasad		
2011	Bete			
2011	Dhan Dhana Dhan			
2012	Prarthane			
2012	Jeevana Jokealli			
2012	Dev Son of Mudde Gowda	Mudde Gowda		
2012	Dashamukha	Venkataraman		
2012	Breaking News	Somashekhar		
2013	Myna		Cameo appearance	
2013	Kaddipudi	Sathya Murthy		
2013	Googly	Sharath's father		
2013	Sakkare	Col Cariappa		
2013	Shravani Subramanya	Seetharam		
2014	Brahma	Narayana Murthy		
2014	Manada Mareyalli	Bhujanga Shetty		
2014	Athi Aparoopa	Vishwanath		
2014	Gajakesari	Matadhipathi		
2014	Jai Bajarang Bali			
2015	Vaastu Prakaara	Anantha Krishna		
2015	Mrugashira			
2015	Aatagara	Retired judge	Cameo appearance Nominated, IIFA Utsavam Award for Best Performance in a Supporting Role — Male	
2015	Mr. Airavata	Vitta Gowda		
2015	Plus	Jai		
2015	First Rank Raju	Professor		
2015	The Plan			
2015	Prema Pallakki			
2016	Maduveya Mamatheya Kareyole	Krishne Gowda	Nominated, IIFA Utsavam Award for Best Performance in a Supporting Role — Male	
2016	Parapancha	Naalkane	Also playback singer of "Kavanagalu" (11 shayaris)	
2016	U the End A			
2016	...Re			
2016	Godhi Banna Sadharana Mykattu	Venkob Rao	Filmfare Award for Best Actor – Kannada; IIFA Utsavam Award for Best Performance in a Leading Role — Male	
2016	Jaggu Dada	Satyanarayan		
2016	Santheyalli Nintha Kabira	Kabir's Guru	Cameo appearance	
2016	Crazy Boy		Cameo appearance	
2016	Santhu Straight Forward	Ananya's grandfather		
2017	Raajakumara	Vishwa Joshi		
2017	March 22	Geologist		
2017	Mugulu Nage	Doctor		
2017	Gowdru Hotel			
2018	Hottegagi Genu Battegagi	Shyam Prasad		
2018	Sarkari Hi. Pra. Shaale, Kasaragodu, Koduge: Ramanna Rai	Anantha Padmanabha P.	Nominated—SIIMA Award for Best Actor in a Leading Role (Male) – Kannada	
2018	K.G.F: Chapter 1	Anand Ingalagi	Also narrator	
2019	Aduva Gombe	Kishan		
2019	Kavalu Daari	Muthanna		
2019	Yaana			
2019	Ayushman Bhava	Gopi		
2019	Weekend			
2020	India vs England	Bhagiratha		
2021	Drishya 2	Vijay Shankar		
2022	Gaalipata 2	Kishore		
2022	Thimayya & Thimayya	Thimayya		
2022	Vijayanand	B. G. Sankeshwar		
2022	Made in Bengaluru	Prahlad Hiranandani		
2023	Mandala: The UFO Incident	Ram Murthy / 'Nutcase' Murthy		
2025	Rajadrohi	Gowda		

== Other language films ==
Year	Film	Role	Language	Notes	Ref.
1974	Ankur	Surya	Hindi		
1975	Nishant	Anjaiya	Hindi		
1976	Manthan	Chandavarkar	Hindi		
1977	Prema Lekhalu	Madan	Telugu		
1978	Bhumika: The Role	Rajan	Hindi		
1978	Kondura; Anugraham	Parashuram Rao	Hindi; Telugu		
1980	Gehrayee	Nandu	Hindi		
1981	Mangalsutra	Vijay	Hindi		
1981	Kalyug	Bharat Raj	Hindi		
1983	Sookha	Satish Chandra	Hindi		
1987	Swathi Thirunal	Swathi Thirunal	Malayalam		
1991	Shanti Kranti	Daddy	Telugu; Hindi		
1991	Nattukku Oru Nallavan	Daddy	Tamil		
1992	Raat / Raatri	Psychiatrist	Hindi / Telugu		
2001	Maya	Arun	Hindi		
2003	Anahat	King of Shravasthi	Marathi		
2003	Stumble	Anand Rao	English		
2004	Sankharavam	Chandra Rayudu	Telugu		
2004	Yuva	Avinash Balachandran	Hindi		
2005	Balu	Baba	Telugu		
2020	Bheeshma	Bheeshma	Telugu		

== Television ==
Year	Show	Role	Ref.
1987	Malgudi Days (Hindi)	Jagan (in Vendor of Sweets)	
1997	Swarajnama	Tipu Sultan	
2002	Garva		
2006–2008	Preeti Illada Mele	Rajashekhara Hampapura	
2013	Chitte Hejje		
2013	Lottery		
2013	Nithyotsava		
