= Mandeep Roy =

Indian film actor (1949–2023)

- Born: Maanu Ulpe; 13 April 1949; Bombay, Bombay Province, Dominion of India
- Died: 29 January 2023 (aged 73); Bengaluru, Karnataka, India
- Other name: Mandeep Rai
- Occupation: Actor
- Years active: 1960s–2022
- Children: 1

Mandeep Roy (13 April 1949 – 29 January 2023) was an Indian actor known for his work in Kannada cinema. After beginning his career on stage in Marathi theatre, he transitioned into film acting with the Kannada film, Minchina Ota (1980). He is noted for his frequent collaboration with actor and filmmaker Shankar Nag. Born as Maanu Ulpe, he renamed himself as Mandeep Roy owing to "his fascination for trendy names".

Known for playing comedic roles, Roy was noted for his performances in Aakasmika (1993), Kurigalu Saar Kurigalu (2001), Amrithadhare (2005), Aaptha Rakshaka (2010) and ...Re (2016). He appeared in more than 500 Kannada films. Additionally, he also appeared in a handful Tamil and Malayalam films, and one television serial in Marathi.

== Early life ==
Roy was born on 13 April 1949 in Bombay (now Mumbai) into a Konkani-speaking family. However, his parents hailed from South Canara (today Dakshina Kannada district of Karnataka). They moved to Mumbai and settled in Talmakiwadi where Roy was born and grew up in. He completed his schooling at a boarding school near Thane. Roy obtained two undergraduate degrees in engineering: in automotive from M. H. Saboo Siddik College of Engineering, and in computer science from VJTI, Matunga in Mumbai. His first job was in a garage, which he would do alongside pursuing the computer science degree. After a minor mishap at the garage, he changed his job, and upon obtaining the latter degree, began working for Tata Consultancy Services as a computer science engineer. He later worked as a cab driver, and during this time, also learned film editing.

== Career ==
Roy made his presence felt in Kannada cinema after the era dominated by Dwarakish. He was unique because he never depended on dialogues and mannerisms to evoke laughter. He could provide comic relief merely by his expressions.

— Sreedhara Murthy, film critic

In the 1970s, Roy was drawn to amateur theatre, influenced by actor and friend Amol Palekar. As a youngster, Roy had also been friends with brothers Anant Nag and Shankar Nag, and followed them later into stage acting in Marathi. Roy became popular for his role in Palekar's play Pandhari, in which he played a waiter "who becomes a victim of exploitation" after having been subjected to child abuse. He also acted in a Kannada play during this time titled Poorva Janmada Preethi directed by Venkata Rao Talegiri. Based on S. L. Bhyrappa's novel Naayi Neralu, the play explored themes such as reincarnation, and had Roy playing an elderly character. The play was later adapted into the film, Janma Janmada Anubandha (1980) by Shankar Nag, who reasoned that Roy not play the role considering it was too early in the latter's film career. The role was played by K. S. Ashwath. Subsequently, to pursue a career in Kannada films, he followed the Nag brothers to Bengaluru.

Roy made his film debut as a corrupt cop in Shankar Nag's Minchina Ota (1980). Nag's wife and actress Arundathi helped him with the dialogues, since he could not speak in Kannada during the time. Nag cast Roy again in his television series, Malgudi Days (1986). The two would collaborate multiple times until Nag's death in 1990, in films such as Geetha (1981) and Accident (1984). His final appearance came in Made in Bengaluru (2022). He would go on to appear in comedic roles in films starring Dr. Rajkumar, Vishnuvardhan and Ambareesh. Roy was hired to play a comedic sequence in Singeetam Srinivasa Rao's Bhagyada Lakshmi Baramma (1986) starring Rajkumar. However, his bit did not make the final cut. Rao then signed Roy again for his next, Pushpaka Vimana (1987).

Roy first suffered a cardiac arrest in December 2022 and was admitted to a hospital in Bengaluru. He was receiving treatment, when he suffered another attack on the early hours of 29 January 2023. He died from it, aged 73.

== Filmography ==
| Year | Film | Role | Notes |
|---|---|---|---|
| 1980 | Minchina Ota | Thimmaiah | |
| 1981 | Devara Aata | | |
| 1981 | Geetha | Hanumantha | |
| 1982 | Baadada Hoo | | |
| 1983 | Benkiya Bale | | |
| 1983 | Hosa Theerpu | Mootayya | |
| 1984 | Makkaliralavva Mane Thumba | | |
| 1985 | Bidugadeya Bedi | | |
| 1985 | Hendthi Beku Hendthi | Basava | |
| 1986 | Nannavaru | | |
| 1987 | Digvijaya | Constable Ranga | |
| 1987 | Pushpaka Vimana | | Silent film |
| 1987 | Anthima Ghatta | | |
| 1988 | Elu Suttina Kote | | |
| 1989 | Gajapathi Garvabhanga | | |
| 1989 | Manmatha Raja | Thimmanna | |
| 1989 | Yuga Purusha | Dr Dayal | |
| 1990 | Mathsara | Dilip Chenji | |
| 1990 | Aasegobba Meesegobba | | |
| 1990 | Ashwamedha | "Sautu" | |
| 1990 | Michael Madana Kama Rajan | Office colleague | Tamil film; uncredited |
| 1991 | Bhairavi | | |
| 1991 | Golmaal Part 2 | Motu Mal | |
| 1992 | Maavanige Takka Aliya | Nair | |
| 1992 | Agni Panjara | | |
| 1992 | Bombat Hendthi | | |
| 1992 | Bharjari Gandu | | |
| 1993 | Aathanka | Vishwanath | |
| 1993 | Aakasmika | Srikanth | |
| 1993 | Kumkuma Bhagya | Brahma | |
| 1994 | Apoorva Samsara | | |
| 1995 | Bal Nan Maga | | |
| 1996 | Aayudha | | |
| 1997 | Agni IPS | | |
| 1998 | Arjun Abhimanyu | | |
| 1998 | King | | |
| 1998 | Preethsod Thappa | | |
| 1999 | Rambhe Urvashi Menake | | |
| 1999 | Chandramukhi Pranasakhi | | |
| 2000 | Nan Hendthi Chennagidale | Raja | |
| 2000 | Deepavali | | |
| 2001 | Aunty Preethse | | |
| 2001 | Chitte | | |
| 2001 | Vaalee | Detective | Uncredited |
| 2001 | Kurigalu Saar Kurigalu | Seetapathi | |
| 2002 | Nagarahavu | | |
| 2002 | Aathma | | |
| 2003 | Pakka Chukka | Cook | |
| 2003 | Kushee | | |
| 2004 | Avale Nanna Gelathi | | |
| 2005 | Ayya | | |
| 2005 | Thunta | Seth Ghanshyam Das | |
| 2006 | Hatavadi | | |
| 2007 | Sixer | Professor | |
| 2007 | Ganesha | | |
| 2008 | Beladingalagi Baa | | |
| 2008 | Kodagana Koli Nungitha | | |
| 2009 | Taxi No-1 | | |
| 2010 | Aptharakshaka | | |
| 2011 | Rangappa Hogbitna | Physician | |
| 2012 | Alemari | Building contractor | |
| 2013 | Paraari | | |
| 2013 | Victory | Physician | |
| 2014 | Amanusha | | |
| 2015 | Ond Chance Kodi | | |
| 2015 | Ranna | | |
| 2015 | Buguri | Physician | |
| 2015 | 1st Rank Raju | Principal of college | |
| 2015 | Care of Footpath 2 | Angry Customer at Petrol Pump | Kannada-Hindi bilingual film |
| 2016 | Maduveya Mamatheya Kareyole | | |
| 2016 | ...Re | Physicist | |
| 2016 | Kotigobba 2 | Shopowner | |
| 2017 | Pushpaka Vimana | | |
| 2017 | Raajakumara | | |
| 2018 | Sankashta Kara Ganapathi | Ashok | |
| 2021 | Auto Ramanna | | |
| 2022 | Trikona | Annayya | |
| 2022 | Made in Bengaluru | | |
| 2023 | Mandala: The UFO Incident | Raju | |

== See also ==
- List of people from Karnataka
