= Shivashankar =

- Promotional poster
- Directed by: H. R. Bhargava
- Written by: Chi. Udaya Shankar
- Screenplay by: H. R. Bhargava
- Story by: Chi. Udaya Shankar
- Produced by: Bhargava; Rajaram
- Starring: Vishnuvardhan; Shobhana; Ramesh Bhat; Mukhyamantri Chandru
- Cinematography: D. V. Rajaram
- Edited by: Victor Yadav
- Music by: Rajan–Nagendra
- Production company: Kalakruthi
- Distributed by: Kalakruthi
- Release date: 28 March 1990
- Running time: 140 minutes
- Country: India
- Language: Kannada

Shivashankar is a 1990 Indian Kannada-language film, directed by H. R. Bhargava and produced by Bhargava and Rajaram. The film stars Vishnuvardhan, Shobhana, Ramesh Bhat and Mukhyamantri Chandru. The film has musical score by Rajan–Nagendra. The core story line of the movie is inspired by the 1985 Hong Kong film Heart of Dragon, starring Jackie Chan, which was also later on used in the 1992 Hindi movie Jaan Se Pyaara - which followed the plot of the original but adapted the template of this movie by having the lead in dual roles of brothers. It marked actress Shobhana's second and final Kannada film to date.

== Plot ==
Shankar earns a living by running a poultry farm. He earns the wrath of a notorious criminal when he helps Moorthi, a police officer, arrest his henchmen.

== Cast ==
- Vishnuvardhan as Shivu and Shankar (Dual Roles)
- Shobhana as Girija
- Ramesh Bhat
- Mukhyamantri Chandru as Advocate
- Sudheer
- Doddanna as Yogi
- Sihikahi Chandru
- Master Manjunath as Manjunath
- Master Ravindra
- Master Vinod Kumar
- Master Anand
- Master Madan

== Soundtrack ==
The music was composed by Rajan–Nagendra.

No.	Song	Singers	Lyrics	Length (m:ss)
1	"Priye Priye"	S. P. Balasubrahmanyam, Manjula Gururaj	M. N. Vyasarao	05:18
2	"Simhada Balave Banthu Eega"	S. P. Balasubrahmanyam	Chi. Udaya Shankar	05:05
3	"Ninna Nodidagalene Chali Chali"	Manjula Gururaj	Chi. Udaya Shankar	05:10
4	"Mamatheyo Mahavo"	S. P. Balasubrahmanyam	Su. Rudramurthy Shastry	04:33
5	"Kila Kila Nagutha Baro"	Vishnuvardhan, Manjula Gururaj, Chandrika Gururaj	Chi. Udaya Shankar	05:11
6	"Nanna Koliige Olle Hunja Beku"	S. P. Balasubrahmanyam, Manjula	Chi. Udaya Shankar	05:06
