= Master Manjunath =

Indian actor

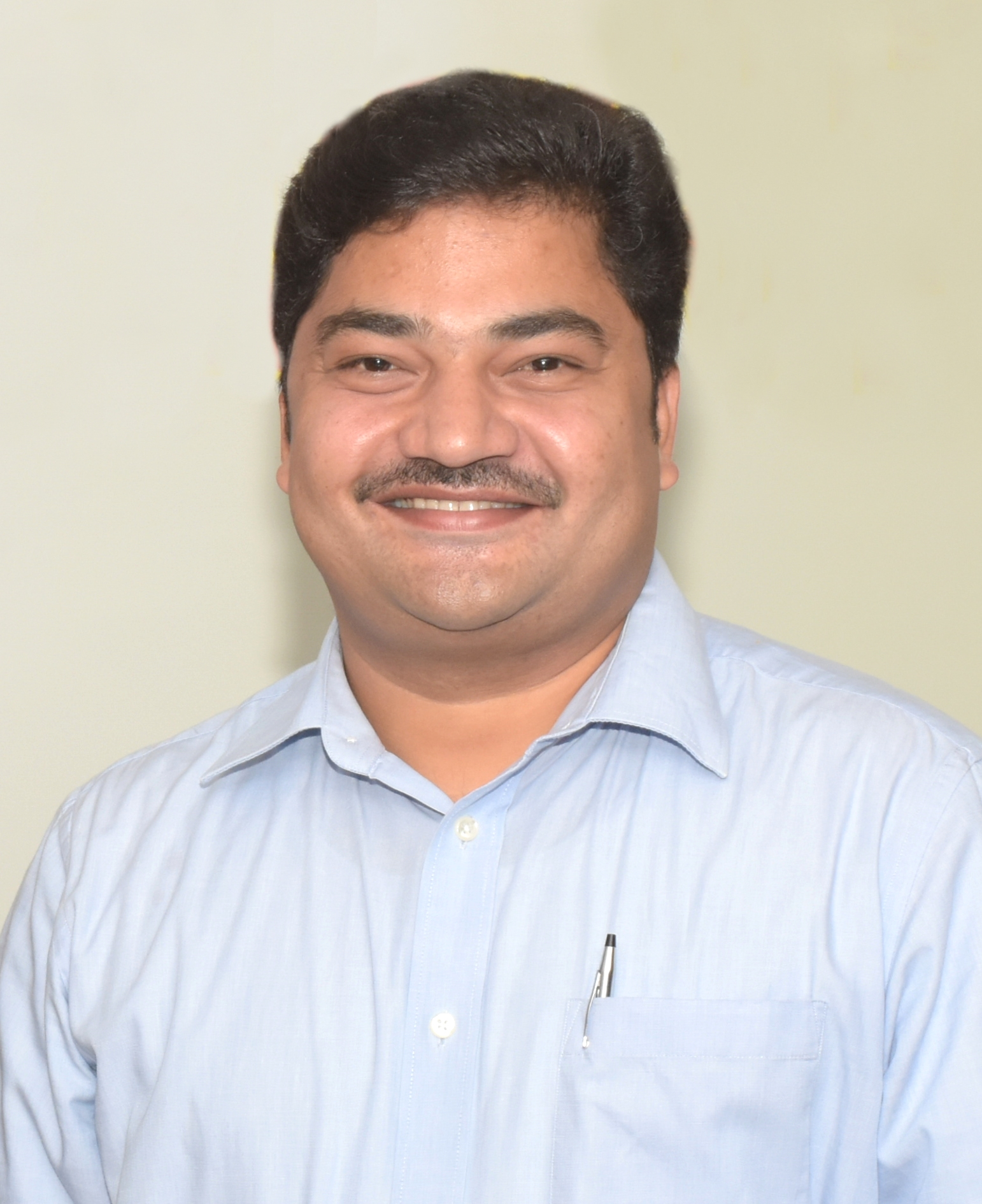
- Manjunath in November 2021
- Born: Manjunath Nayaker
- Occupation: Actor
- Years active: 1982–1992
- Known for: Role Swami in Malgudi Days (1987); Acting with Ravichandran in Ranadheera (1987); Gangaadharam (Swati Kiranam) (1992)
- Spouse: Swarnarekha
- Children: 1 Son - Vedanth

Manjunath Nayaker is a former Indian actor and public relations professional. He is better known by his screen name, Master Manjunath and "Swamy" for his lead role in the television series Malgudi Days (1987) directed by Shankar Nag and in its film version, Swami And Friends.

== Early life ==
Nayaker was born in Bangalore, Karnataka, India. He gained a Bachelor of Arts degree in English and a Master of Arts degree in Sociology from Mysore University and Bangalore University. He also holds a Diploma in cinematography and CA Foundation course.

== Career ==
Manjunath, who started acting at age three, has been part of 68 films in Kannada, Telugu and Hindi, but it was his role in Swami and Friends that fetched him recognition, in addition to six international, one national and a state award. The series was shot during his school vacation in 1985–86, and telecast in 1987. He acted in Super Hit movies of actor-director Shankar Nag such as Nodi Swamy Navirodu Hige, Sangliana and S.P. Sangliana 2. He also played the role of young Vijay Deenanath Chauhan in Agneepath (1990), which starred Amitabh Bachchan. He later co-starred alongside Mammootty in the 1992 Telugu film Swati Kiranam.

He quit acting at the age of 19 to concentrate on his studies.

He, initially worked in IT companies publishing SSLC, PUC, Diploma and University Degree Results on the Internet through the website www.onlinebangalore.com and later went on work as a PR & Liaison professional and worked on the Bangalore – Mysore Infrastructure Corridor Project (BMICP) and now runs his own Liaison company - VIC Pvt Ltd.

== Personal life ==
Manjunath is married to athlete Swarnarekha, a sprinter and long jumper.

== Filmography ==
Year	Film	Role	Language	Ref.
1982	Ajit	Govinda	Kannada	
1982	Muttinantha Attige		Kannada	
1982	Tony	Damodara	Kannada	
1983	Jagga		Kannada	
1983	Hosa Theerpu	Seenu	Kannada	
1983	Banker Margayya	Young Balu	Kannada	
1983	Nodi Swamy Navirodu Hige	Chotay	Kannada	
1984	Utsav		Hindi	
1984	Raktha Tilaka	Hanumanthu	Kannada	
1984	Nagabekamma Nagabeku	Chandru	Kannada	
1984	Avala Antharanga		Kannada	
1984	Ediru Alegalu		Kannada	
1984	Makkaliralavva Mane Thumba	Krishna	Kannada	
1984	Kaliyuga	Manja	Kannada	
1984	Netra Pallavi		Kannada	
1984	Mooru Janma		Kannada	
1984	Thaliya Bhagya		Kannada	
1984	Benki Birugali	Raja	Kannada	
1985	Goonda Guru	Lakko	Kannada	
1985	Manava Danava	Amar	Kannada	
1985	Kuridoddi Kurukshetra		Kannada	
1985	Parameshi Prema Prasanga	Paapu	Kannada	
1986	Devathe		Kannada	
1986	Nannavaru		Kannada	
1987	Malgudi Days	Swami	Hindi, English	
1987	Huli Hebbuli	Vijayendra	Kannada	
1987	Poorna Chandra	Young Chandra	Kannada	
1987	Ee Bandha Anubandha	Manju	Kannada	
1988	Tabarana Kathe		Kannada	
1988	Ranadheera		Kannada	
1988	Nava Bharatha	Ravi	Kannada	
1988	Sangliyana	Avinash	Kannada	
1988	Varna Chakra		Kannada	
1988	Anjada Gandu	Keshava	Kannada	
1988	Ranaranga	Anand	Kannada	
1988	Sahasa Veera	Manju	Kannada	
1988	Sri Venkateshwara Mahime		Kannada	
1989	Yuddha Kaanda	Chaddi	Kannada	
1989	Guru		Kannada	
1989	Sharavegada Saradara		Kannada	
1989	Kindari Jogi	Bommai	Kannada	
1989	Love Maadi Nodu	Gopi	Kannada	
1989	Bangarada Baduku	Geetu	Kannada	
1989	Narasimha	Manju	Kannada	
1990	Agneepath	Young Vijay Deenanath Chauhan	Hindi	
1990	S. P. Sangliyana Part 2	Avinash	Kannada	
1990	Shivashankar	Manju	Kannada	
1990	Mathsara	Young Jayanth	Kannada	
1990	Shabarimale Swamy Ayyappa		Kannada	
1991	The Stone Boy	Ajith	Hindi	
1991	Benaam Badsha		Hindi	
1991	Teja		Kannada	
1991	Ramachaari	Young Ramachaari	Kannada	
1992	Vishwatma	Babu	Hindi	
1992	Swathi Kiranam	Gangadharam	Telugu	
