= Ashwamedha (film) =

- Poster of the film
- Directed by: C. R. Simha
- Written by: C. R. Simha; Keerthi
- Produced by: Shanthilal Jain
- Starring: Kumar Bangarappa; Geethanjali
- Cinematography: R. Deviprasad
- Edited by: S. Manohar
- Music by: Sangeetha Raja
- Production company: Sri Renukamba Enterprises
- Release date: 1990
- Running time: 135 minutes
- Country: India
- Language: Kannada

Ashwamedha is a 1990 Indian Kannada language action film directed by C. R. Simha. It stars Kumar Bangarappa and Geethanjali with Srividya, Srinath, Balakrishna, Avinash and Ramesh Bhat essaying other important roles.

The story was written by C. R. Simha who co-wrote the screenplay and dialogues with Keerthi. The film was produced by Shanthilal Jain in the banner of Sri Renukamba Enterprises. The film was edited by S. Manohar while R. Deviprasad handled the cinematography.

== Cast ==
- Kumar Bangarappa as Raja / Vinu (Note: They played one character with two names.)
- Geethanjali (Lissy) as Ganga
- Srinath as Dayanand
- Srividya as Savitri
- T. N. Balakrishna as Rama
- Keerthiraj as Panku / Manu
- Ramesh Bhat as Gunda
- Avinash as Muthanna
- Ashok Rao as Dhanraj
- Ashok Badaradinni
- Disco Shanti as dancer
- M. S. Karanth
- Bank Janardhan
- Siddaramaiah
- Mandeep Roy as "Sautu", Panku's friend
- G. G. Hegde as Panku's friend
- Shashikiran as Panku's friend
- Pranaya Murthy
- Ashok Bhadravathi
- Bheema Rao
- Vasudeva Girimaji
- Michael Madhu as Dhanraj's henchman

== Soundtrack ==
Ashwamedha
- Soundtrack cover

Soundtrack album by Sangeetha Raja
- Released: 26 January 1990
- Genre: Feature film soundtrack
- Length: 26:36
- Language: Kannada
- Label: Lahari Music

Sangeetha Raja chronology
Ekalavya (1990)	Ashwamedha (1990)	Sundara Kanda (1991)

Sangeetha Raja composed the background score for the film and to the soundtrack, with the lyrics for the soundtrack written by Doddarange Gowda. The album consists of five tracks. The track "Hrudaya Samudra Kalaki" sung by actor and playback singer, Dr. Rajkumar, was received very well and is often considered one of his best songs. The song is still played in cultural and religious activities, and concerts across Karnataka.

Track listing
No.	Title	Lyrics	Singer(s)	Length
1.	"Hrudaya Samudra Kalaki"	Doddarange Gowda	Rajkumar	6:25
2.	"Yako Eno Nannede"	Doddarange Gowda	Manjula Gururaj, S. P. Balasubrahmanyam	4:51
3.	"Ee Jaya Nimmade"	Doddarange Gowda	Manjula Gururaj, S. P. Balasubrahmanyam	4:57
4.	"Ee Jeevanave Ullasa"	Doddarange Gowda	Manjula Gururaj	5:31
5.	"A B C D"	Doddarange Gowda	S. P. Balasubrahmanyam	4:52
Total length:				26:36
