= Geetha (1981 film) =

- DVD cover
- Directed by: Shankar Nag
- Screenplay by: Arundathi Nag; Shankar Nag
- Story by: Arundathi Nag; Shankar Nag
- Produced by: N. Bhakthavatsalan, A. N. Murthy
- Starring: Shankar Nag; Akshatha Rao
- Cinematography: B. C. Gowrishankar
- Edited by: P. Bhakthavathsalam
- Music by: Ilaiyaraaja
- Production company: Pushpa Production
- Distributed by: Padmashri Pictures; Kushtagi Films
- Release date: 1981
- Running time: 125 minutes
- Country: India
- Language: Kannada

Geetha is a 1981 Indian Kannada-language romantic drama film directed by and starring Shankar Nag in lead, alongside Akshatha Rao in title role. The supporting cast features K. S. Ashwath, Ramesh Bhat and Gayathri. Ilaiyaraaja composed the soundtrack and the background score for the film that and was declared a blockbuster musical hit. He went on to re-use four songs from the movie in five different films later. The track "Santhoshakke" from the film became widely popular in Karnataka and is still performed for in concerts and other events.

The characterization of the lead actress from Mani Ratnam 's 1989 Telugu movie Geethanjali was reported to have been partially borrowed from this movie – the chirpy attitude with which the eponymous lead speaks and behaves – and also bore a great resemblance in terms of closure of the movie – where she breathes her last due to cancer in the climax.

== Plot ==
Geetha (Akshatha Rao) is a college-going student, who has co-organised a charity concert in her college. Sanjay (Shankar Nag), a singer, performs at the show singing the track "Santhoshakke". Floored by his performance and good looks, she pursues him. A university champion in badminton, she invites him to her club to play, with an intention to get closer to him and succeeds. However, Geetha has an illness, the symptoms of which is seen in her holding her neck tight and screaming. Her father Srinivas (K. S. Ashwath) has a heart ailment. Following another of Sanjay's concert, she confesses her love to him. He, however fails to remember her every time, and eventually, falls in love with her.

Upon diagnosis, it is revealed to Geetha's mother, Dr. Mukta (Sowcar Janaki) that she has blood cancer, which is not revealed to her father and her. Eager to learn to drive a car, Geetha pesters Sanjay to teach her to drive. Sanjay flusters every time she asks him, and finally reveals to her about his ex-girlfriend Sunanda, who succumbed as a brake-failed vehicle she was driving exploded. Deciding to get married, Sanjay speaks to Geetha's mother, and she reveals to him of the latter's illness. The illness takes a toll on Geetha's eyes and she loses her eyesight among other visible bodily wounds. Sanjay, with the help of Dr. Rudrappa (Lohithashwa) gets an Interferon drug, an alleged cure of cancer, imported from California. He collects it from the airport but Geetha breathes her last by the time he arrives at her house with the drug.

== Cast ==
- Shankar Nag as Sanjay
- Akshatha Rao as Geetha
- K. S. Ashwath as Srinivas
- Sowcar Janaki as Mukta
- Ramesh Bhat as Satish
- Gayatri as Sunanda
- Shyamala
- Shivaram as Linganna
- Mandeep Roy as Hanumantha
- Tiger Prabhakar as an astrologer
- Lohithaswa as Doctor Rudrappa
- Hanumanthachar
- Kunigal Ramanath
- Sunali (credited as Baby Sunali)

== Soundtrack ==
Geetha

Soundtrack album by Ilaiyaraaja
- Released: 1981
- Genre: Feature film soundtrack
- Length: 26:47
- Label: Sangeetha Music

Ilaiyaraaja chronology
Chinnari Chitti Babu (1981)	Geetha (1981)	Janma Janmada Anubandha (1981)

Ilaiyaraaja composed the background score for the film and the soundtrack, lyrics for which was written by Chi. Udaya Shankar. The soundtrack album consists of six tracks. Ilaiyaraaja later adapted the track "Jotheyali" as "Vizhiyile Mani" for the Tamil film Nooravathu Naal and as "Jaane Do Na" for the 2007 Hindi film Cheeni Kum. "Nanna Jeeva" was adapted as "Devan Thandha Veenai" for Unnai Naan Santhithen. "Kelade" was adapted as "Devathai Ilam Devi" for Aayiram Nilave Vaa. The song "Santhoshakke" was adapted as "Adichikko Site Adichikko" for the film Kairasikkaran. The song "Jotheyali" became one of the best duets of SPB and SJ in kannada cinema

Track listing
No.	Title	Singer(s)	Length
1.	"Geetha"	S. P. Balasubrahmanyam	4:11
2.	"Santhoshakke"	S. P. Balasubrahmanyam	4:16
3.	"Kelade Nimageega"	S. P. Balasubrahmanyam	5:11
4.	"Yene Kelu"	S. P. Balasubrahmanyam, S. Janaki	4:36
5.	"Nanna Jeeva"	S. P. Balasubrahmanyam, S. Janaki	4:10
6.	"Jotheyali"	S. P. Balasubrahmanyam, S. Janaki	4:23
Total length:			26:47
