= Muniyana Madari =

- Directed by: S. K. Bhagavan
- Written by: Chi. Udaya Shankar (dialogues)
- Screenplay by: S. K. Bhagavan
- Story by: Ashwattha (Based on Novel)
- Produced by: S. K. Bhagavan
- Starring: Shankar Nag; Jai Jagadish; Kokila Mohan; Jayamala
- Cinematography: B. C. Gowrishankar
- Edited by: P. Bhakthavathsalam
- Music by: Rajan–Nagendra
- Production company: Anupam Movies
- Distributed by: Anupam Movies
- Release date: 29 August 1981
- Running time: 141 min
- Country: India
- Language: Kannada

Muniyana Madari is a 1981 Indian Kannada-language film, directed and produced by S. K. Bhagavan. The film stars Shankar Nag, Jai Jagadish, Kokila Mohan and Jayamala. The film has musical score by Rajan–Nagendra.

== Cast ==
- Shankar Nag as Muniya
- Jai Jagadish as Maralappa
- Mohan
- Jayamala
- Rajya Lakshmi
- Leelavathi
- Rajanand
- Ramesh
- Lohithaswa
- Mysore Lokesh
- Anantharam Maccheri
- Kalale Dorai
- Bhatti Mahadevappa
- Chandrahas
- Kumar Aradhya
- Pranavamurthy
- Lalithamma
- Kaminidharan
- Prema
- Vijayaleela
- Rathnamma
- Shanthamma
- Master Ravi
- Master Srinidhi
- Master Prabhu

== Soundtrack ==
The music was composed by Rajan–Nagendra.

No.	Song	Singers	Lyrics	Length (m:ss)
1	"Indigintha"	K. J. Yesudas, P. Jayachandran	Chi. Udaya Shankar	04:36
2	"Kaalgejje Thaalake"	P. Jayachandran, S. Janaki	Chi. Udaya Shankar	04:15
3	"Maathu Ondu Maathu"	S. P. Balasubrahmanyam, Sulochana	Chi. Udaya Shankar	04:32
4	"Halli Daariyalli"	S. P. Balasubrahmanyam	Chi. Udaya Shankar	04:32
