= The Plan (2015 film) =

- Directed by: Keerthi
- Written by: Keerthi
- Produced by: Ashok Shetty; Sunil Shetty; Keerthi
- Starring: Ananth Nag; Ramesh Bhat; Sanath S Promod Shetty; Kousthubh Jayakumar; Hemanth; Sriram
- Cinematography: Dipankar Sikder
- Edited by: Abhro Banarjee
- Music by: Surender Sodhi
- Production companies: Day Dream Creations and Malgudi Talkies
- Release date: 27 November 2015
- Running time: 142 minutes
- Country: India
- Language: Kannada

The Plan (Kannada: ದಿ ಪ್ಲಾನ್) is a 2015 Indian Kannada suspense thriller film written and directed by Keerthi in his debut, and produced by Ashok Shetty. The cast includes Ananth Nag, Sanath S, Kousthubh Jayakumar, Hemanth, Sriram, Jagadish, Gauthami, Harish Roy, and Ramesh Bhat. The film's background score is done by Surender Sodhi.

== Plot ==
Three youngsters are sent to Madikeri District Prison for their crime by district court for a crime. The prisoners explore the option of escape from the prison with detail plan. How they succeed and deal with strict jailer?

== Cast ==
- Ananth Nag
- Ramesh Bhat
- Sanath S
- Gowthami Gowda
- Pramod Shetty
- Kousthubh Jayakumar
- Hemanth
- Sriram
- Jagadish
- Harish Roy

== Soundtrack ==
The soundtrack consists of 1 song composed by Richard for which the lyrics is written by Ranjith B. L.

- "Hogide Jaari" - Shaan
