= Auto Raaja =

- Title card
- Directed by: K. Vijayan
- Story by: M. D. Sundar
- Starring: Vijayakanth; Jaishankar; Gayathri
- Music by: Shankar–Ganesh; Ilaiyaraaja (1 song)
- Production company: Santosh Art Films
- Release date: 27 March 1982
- Running time: 110 minutes
- Country: India
- Language: Tamil

Auto Raaja is a 1982 Indian Tamil-language film, directed by K. Vijayan. The film stars Vijayakanth, Jaishankar and Gayathri. It is a remake of the 1980 Kannada film of the same name. The film was released on 27 March 1982.

== Cast ==
- Vijayakanth as Raja
- Jaishankar as Ramu
- Gayathri as Rani / Bhavani
- Vanitha as Shanthi
- Sangili Murugan as Chellappa
- Thengai Srinivasan as Doctor
- V. K. Ramasamy as Servant
- Chithra as Raja's sister
- T. K. S. Natarajan as Peon
- Kallapetti Singaram as Iyer
- Haja Sheriff as Saambu, Iyer's son
- Bayilvan Ranganathan as Henchman

== Soundtrack ==
The soundtrack was composed by Shankar–Ganesh while Ilaiyaraaja composed one song "Sangathil Padatha". The lyrics for all songs were written by Pulamaipithan. The songs "Malare Enna" and "Kannil Vannam" are based on "Naliva Gulabi" and "Nanna Aase", respectively, from the original Kannada version of Auto Raja.

Ilaiyaraaja re-used the tune of "Sangathil Padatha" in the 1982 Malayalam film Olangal as "Thumbi Vaa"; the 1986 Telugu film Nireekshana as "Aakasham Eenatido; in Kanne Kalaimaane (the Tamil-dubbed version of Nireekshana) as "Neerveezhchi Thee Muttuthey"; in the 1996 Hindi film Aur Ek Prem Kahani as "Monday To Uth Kar", and in the 2009 Hindi film Paa as "Gumm Summ Gumm".

| Song | Singer(s) | Composer |
|---|---|---|
| "Sangathil Padatha" | Ilaiyaraaja, S. Janaki | Ilaiyaraaja |
| "Malare Enna Kolam" | S. P. Balasubrahmanyam | Shankar–Ganesh |
| "Kanni Vannam" | S. P. Balasubrahmanyam, Vani Jairam | Shankar–Ganesh |
| "Oru Vargappuratchi" | T. M. Soundararajan | Shankar–Ganesh |
| "Kattilarai" | S. Janaki | Shankar–Ganesh |
| "Oosikkulle" | Malaysia Vasudevan, chorus | Shankar–Ganesh |

== Reception ==
Kalki wrote Thengai Srinivasan's acting overshadowed other actors in the film.
