= Huli Hebbuli =

- Directed by: Vijay
- Written by: Shanmuga Sundaram
- Produced by: B. Nagi Reddy
- Starring: Shankar Nag; Bhavya; Sumalatha; Tiger Prabhakar
- Cinematography: S. Ramachandra
- Edited by: T. Shashikumar
- Music by: Vijaya Bhaskar
- Production company: Sri Durga Art Productions
- Release date: 1987
- Running time: 109 minutes
- Country: India
- Language: Kannada

Huli Hebbuli is a 1987 Kannada-language action film directed by Vijay and written by Shanmuga Sundaram. The film starred Shankar Nag, Tiger Prabhakar, Sumalatha and Bhavya with Anant Nag in an extended special appearance. The film was produced by B. Nagi Reddy. The film's score and songs were composed by Vijaya Bhaskar to the lyrics of Chi. Udaya Shankar. The cinematography was by S. Ramachandra. The director remade the movie in Hindi in 1988 as Ganga Tere Desh Mein.

== Cast ==
- Tiger Prabhakar as Vijay
- Shankar Nag as Inspector Ajay
- Bhavya as Geetha
- Anant Nag as Lawyer Sriram (cameo)
- Sumalatha as Dr. Priya
- Leelavathi as Kamala, Vijay and Ajay's mother
- Disco Shanthi
- Sundar Krishna Urs as Ramanna, Vijay and Ajay's father
- N. S. Rao as Mukunda
- M. S. Umesh
- Master Manjunath as Young Vijay
- Dingri Nagaraj
- Mandeep Roy
- Sudheer as "Meese" Mariyappa
- Honnavalli Krishna as Ramesh
- Ceylon Manohar as Kalinga

== Soundtrack ==
The music was composed by Vijaya Bhaskar with lyrics by Chi. Udaya Shankar.

Track listing
No.	Title	Singer(s)	Length
1.	"Mutthu Bedide"	S. P. Balasubrahmanyam, Vani Jairam
2.	"Putta Putta Makkale"	S. P. Balasubrahmanyam, B. R. Chaya
