= Aarada Gaaya =

- Directed by: V. Somashekhar
- Written by: M. D. Sundar
- Produced by: Gowramma Somasekhar; Dhanalakshmi Vijay
- Starring: Shankar Nag; Gayatri
- Cinematography: P. S. Prakash
- Edited by: P. Bhaktavatsalam
- Music by: Satyam
- Production company: Vijayashekar Movies
- Release date: 1980
- Running time: 137 min
- Country: India
- Language: Kannada

Aarada Gaaya is a 1980 Indian Kannada-language action film, written by M. D. Sundar and directed by V. Somashekhar. It was produced under the banner of Vijayashekar Movies. Shankar Nag, Gayatri, Sowcar Janaki and Kanchana appeared in pivotal roles. The music was composed by Satyam, with the lyrics of Chi. Udaya Shankar.

== Cast ==
- Shankar Nag as Mohan, Press Reporter
- Gayatri as Meena, Mohan's love interest
- Vajramuni as Thammaji (Master), Mohan's foster father
- Sowcar Janaki as Judge Janaki, Mohan's mother
- Shakti Prasad as Malappa
- Kanchana as Mangala, Malappa's wife
- Jai Jagadish as Sridhar, Thammaji's son
- Thoogudeepa Srinivas
- Tiger Prabhakar as Charlie
- Rajashankar as Nath, Mohan's father
- Dinesh as 'Still' Simon, Mohan's friend
- Jyothi Lakshmi
- Jayamalini
- N. S. Rao

== Soundtrack ==
All songs were composed and scored by Satyam. The songs "Nanna Baala Baaninalli" and "Bidu Bidu Kopava" were instant hits upon release.

S. No.	Song title	Singer(s)	Lyricist
1	"Bedaruve Eke Heege"	S. P. Balasubrahmanyam, S. Janaki	Chi. Udayashankar
2	"Ninne Ninne"	S. Janaki	Chi. Udaya Shankar
3	"Bidu Bidu Kopava"	S. P. Balasubrahmanyam, S. Janaki	Chi. Udaya Shankar
4	"Eno Ariye Naanu"	S. Janaki	Chi. Udaya Shankar
5	"Nanna Baala Baaninalli"	P. Susheela	Chi. Udaya Shankar
