= Na Ninna Preetisuve =

Naa Ninna Preethisuve
- Directed by: Somu-Shankar
- Written by: Somu
- Screenplay by: Somu
- Produced by: Manjula Shankar
- Starring: Arjun Sarja; V. Ravichandran; Bhavya; M. P. Shankar
- Cinematography: D. V. Rajaram
- Edited by: Victor Yadav
- Music by: Shankar–Ganesh
- Production company: Mithralaya
- Release date: 31 January 1986
- Country: India
- Language: Kannada

Naa Ninna Preethisuve (transl. I will love you) is a 1986 Indian Kannada film, directed by Somu-Shankar and produced by Manjula Shankar. The film stars Arjun Sarja, V. Ravichandran and Bhavya in lead roles. The film has musical score by Shankar–Ganesh. The movie was dubbed in Telugu as Manchi Mithrulu and in Tamil as Thanthai Mel Aanai.

== Cast ==
- Arjun Sarja as Pruthvi
- V. Ravichandran as Vijay
- Bhavya as Hema
- M. P. Shankar as Lakshmipathi
- C. R. Simha as Jagadish
- Ramesh Bhat as Mallesh
- Uma Shivakumar
- Sathyabhama
- K. Vijaya
- M. S. Karanth
- Suresh
- Ashok
- Sarvamangala
- Lalithamma
- V. Ramachandru
- Chenna
- Shankar
- Honnavalli Krishna
- Meese Krishna
- Ravi
- Hubli Gowda
- Prakash
- C. Anand
- Chikkanna
- Munirangappa
- Master Chethan
- Baby Gayithri
- Shankar Nag in a special appearance
- Srinath in a special appearance
