= Kula Puthra =

- Directed by: T. R. Ramanna
- Story by: M. D. Sundar
- Produced by: S. Venkatarathnam
- Starring: Shankar Nag; Gayatri; Dwarakish
- Cinematography: S. Venkatarathnam
- Edited by: V. Chakrapani
- Music by: Satyam
- Production company: Sri Pallavi Pictures
- Release date: 1981
- Running time: 134 minutes
- Country: India
- Language: Kannada

Kula Puthra ( transl. Son of the family) is a 1981 Indian Kannada-language film directed by T. R. Ramanna and produced by S. Venkataratnam. The film stars Shankar Nag and Gayatri, with Dwarakish, Udaykumar and Leelavathi appearing in supporting roles, and Sowcar Janaki in a cameo role. The film was scripted by S. Bhavanarayana, photographed by S. Venkataratnam and has a musical score by Satyam.

== Cast ==
- Shankar Nag as Mahesh
- Gayatri as Radha
- Sowcar Janaki in a guest appearance
- Udaykumar
- Leelavathi as Varalakshmi
- Dwarakish as Gopi
- Sampath as Ranganath Rao
- Dinesh as Subbanna
- Musuri Krishnamurthy as Ramdas
- Upasane Seetharam
- Halam
- Rajani
- M. N. Lakshmi Devi
- Bheema Rao
- Sundara Murthy
- G. R. Jagadish
- Vinay
- Kannada Raju

== Soundtrack ==
The music for the film was composed by Satyam with lyrics penned by Chi. Udaya Shankar.

Kula Puthra

Soundtrack album by Satyam
- Released: 1981
- Language: Kannada

=== Track list ===
| # | Title | Singer(s) |
|---|---|---|
| 1 | "Ee Lokavondu Pravasi Mandira" | S. P. Balasubrahmanyam, S. Janaki |
| 2 | "Manmatha Kuniyalu" | S. P. Balasubrahmanyam, S. Janaki |
| 3 | "Sampige Hoovalli" | S. P. Balasubrahmanyam, S. Janaki |
| 4 | "Ninnatavella" | S. P. Balasubrahmanyam, S. Janaki |
| 5 | "Baruva Janarige" | S. P. Balasubrahmanyam |
