= Rusthum Jodi =

- Directed by: K. Vijayan
- Story by: Sundar
- Produced by: N. V. Ramaswamy
- Starring: Shankar Nag; Gayatri; Manjula
- Cinematography: Ishan Arya
- Edited by: R. Devarajan
- Music by: G. K. Venkatesh
- Production company: N V R Productions
- Release date: 1980
- Running time: 122 min.
- Country: India
- Language: Kannada

Rusthum Jodi is a 1980 Indian Kannada-language film directed by K. Vijayan and produced by N. V. Ramaswamy. The film stars Shankar Nag and Gayatri whilst Manjula, Shakti Prasad, and Sundar Krishna Urs appeared in special roles. The film was scripted by M. D. Sundar, photographed by Ishan Arya and had musical score by G. K. Venkatesh.

== Cast ==
- Shankar Nag as Shekhar
- Gayatri as Usha
- Manjula as Padma (Special appearance)
- Fighter Shetty as Tony
- Advani Lakshmi Devi as Parvati
- Jayamalini
- Sundar Krishna Urs as Sundar
- Mysore Lokesh as Shekhar's father
- Vinod Mulani
- Kunigal Nagabhushan as Naganna, Usha's father
- Indira
- Pushpa
- Comedian Guggu as constable

== Soundtrack ==
The music of the film was composed by G. K. Venkatesh with lyrics penned by Chi. Udaya Shankar.

Rusthum Jodi

Soundtrack album to Rusthum Jodi by G. K. Venkatesh
- Released: 1980
- Language: Kannada

=== Track list ===
#	Title	Singer(s)
1	"Joly Joly Illi"	S. P. Balasubrahmanyam
2	"Thaani Thandana"	S. Janaki
3	"Bekennalare Saakennalare"	S. Janaki
4	"Nee Hennanne Kandillave"	S. Janaki
