= Ee Bandha Anubandha =

- Directed by: Janakiram
- Screenplay by: A. M. Samee Ullah
- Story by: Shameem Bhanu
- Produced by: A. Radhakrishna Raju; V.L. Srinivasa Murthy
- Starring: Shankar Nag; Zarina Wahab; Master Manjunath
- Cinematography: Janakiram
- Edited by: Suresh Urs
- Music by: Ramesh Naidu
- Release date: 1987
- Country: India
- Language: Kannada

Ee Bandha Anubandha is a 1987 Indian Kannada-language film directed by Janakiram. The film stars Shankar Nag, Master Manjunath and Zarina Wahab. This was Zarina Wahab's only Kannada movie appearance.

== Cast ==
- Shankar Nag as Vijay
- Master Manjunath as Manju
- Zarina Wahab
- M. Jayashree as Vijay's aunt
- Umashree as Prema
- Shyamala
- Archana
- Vajramuni
- Dinesh
- K. V. Manjayya as Gopal

== Soundtrack ==
The music of the film was composed by Ramesh Naidu. The lyrics were penned by Geethapriya and R. N. Jayagopal.

Ee Bandha Anubandha

Soundtrack album to Ee Bandha Anubandha by Ramesh Naidu
- Language: Kannada
- Label: Saregama

=== Track list ===
#	Title	Singer(s)
1	"Ee Bandha Anubandha"	S. P. Balasubrahmanyam
2	"Muddu Kanda"	S. P. Balasubrahmanyam
3	"Ee Bandha Anubandha"	S. Janaki
4	"Ee Bandha Anubandha"	Pallavi
5	"Gokuladinda"	S. Janaki
6	"Chaithra Baruva"	S. Janaki
