= Prana Snehitha =

- VCD cover
- Directed by: H.R. Bhargava
- Written by: Kunigal Nagabhushan
- Screenplay by: H.R. Bhargava
- Story by: Kunigal Nagabhushan
- Produced by: S. D. Ankalagi; B. H. Chandannavar; M. G. Hublikar
- Starring: Shankar Nag; Ramakrishna; Bhavya; Tara
- Cinematography: Kabir Lal
- Edited by: B. Nagesh
- Music by: M. Ranga Rao
- Production company: Bhuvaneshwari Art Productions
- Distributed by: Bhuvaneshwari Art Productions
- Release date: 31 March 1992
- Running time: 137 min
- Country: India
- Language: Kannada

Prana Snehitha (Kannada: ಪ್ರಾಣ ಸ್ನೇಹಿತ) is a 1992 Indian Kannada film, directed by H.R. Bhargava and produced by S.D. Ankalagi, B.H. Chandannavar and M.G. Hublikar. The film stars Shankar Nag, Ramakrishna, Bhavya and Tara in the lead roles. The film has musical score by M. Ranga Rao.

== Plot ==
Best friends Ram and Shyam face many obstacles when they decide to expose the corrupt activities of an evil and powerful businessman, Jagapathi.

== Cast ==
- Shankar Nag as Ram
- Ramakrishna as Shyam
- Bhavya
- Tara
- Sudheer
- Mukhyamantri Chandru
- Ramesh Bhat
- Dinesh
- Kunigal Nagabhushan as Vaikuntha
- B. K. Shankar
- Mysore Lokesh
- Shani Mahadevappa
- Chandannavara
- Rajanand
- Sadashiva Brahmavar
- Umesh
- Sathyabhama
- Sumathi
- Sumathishree
- Master B. K. Sunil
- Master Krishnamurthy
- Master Prashanth
- Baby Nagashilpa
- Baby Savitha
- Phani Ramachandra
- Srishaila
- Saikumar
- Lamani
- Kunigal Ramanath
- H. T. Urs
- Bemel Somanna
- Chikkanna
- Shankar Bhat
- Shivaprakash

== Soundtrack ==
Track listing
No.	Title	Singer(s)	Length
1.	"Hotel Mein Khana"	Vishnu	04:36
2.	"Premavu Nilladha Ale"	Manjula Gururaj	05:00
3.	"Hennondha Kande Naa"		04:33
4.	"Kelo Nanna Dheera"	Manjula Gururaj, B. R. Chaya	04:47
5.	"Hotel Mein Khana Reprise"	Vishnu	04:38
6.	"En Guru Beda Guru"	Vishnu	04:59
