= Maha Purusha =

- Directed by: Joe Simon
- Written by: Ku Nagabhushan (dialogues)
- Screenplay by: Joe Simon
- Story by: Haridas Bhat; Joe Simon
- Produced by: Joe Simon; H. G. Raju; K. S. Nataraju; D. J. Nayak
- Starring: Vishnuvardhan; Gayatri; Jai Jagadish; Chandrashekar
- Cinematography: H. G. Raju
- Edited by: P. Venkateshwara Rao
- Music by: Satyam
- Production company: Bhagya Movies
- Distributed by: Bhagya Movies
- Release date: 21 April 1984
- Running time: 135 minutes
- Country: India
- Language: Kannada

Maha Purusha is a 1985 Indian Kannada-language film, produced and directed by Joe Simon, H. G. Raju, K. S. Nataraju and D. J. Nayak. The film stars Vishnuvardhan, Gayatri, Jai Jagadish and Chandrashekar. The film has musical score by Satyam.

== Cast ==
- Vishnuvardhan
- Gayatri
- Jai Jagadish
- Chandrashekar
- Roopadevi
- Pramila Joshai
- Renuka
- Sulakshana in Guest Appearance
- Chethan Ramarao
- B. K. Shankar
- K. V. Manjaiah
- Gopala Krishna
- Aravind
- Krishna Gaithonde
- Kakolu Ramaiah
- Veerendra Kumar
- Nagaraj
- Idris
- Nataraj
- Vinay
- Jr. Narasimharaju
- Aparichitha Aravind
- Prabhu
- Baby Hema
- Kamala
- Vimala
- Anupama
- Vijayalakshmi
- Bharath

== Soundtrack ==
The music was composed by Satyam.

No.	Song	Singers	Lyrics	Length (m:ss)
1	"Kande Nanna Olavina Hudugiya"	Vishnuvardhan	R. N. Jayagopal	04:23
2	"Ide Prema Sanketha"	S. P. Balasubrahmanyam, S. Janaki	R. N. Jayagopal	04:46
3	"Galli Galli Sutho"	S. P. Balasubrahmanyam, S. Janaki	R. N. Jayagopal	05:11
4	"Yeke Ee Mouna"	S. P. Balasubrahmanyam, S. Janaki	Chi. Udaya Shankar	04:40
