= Bidugadeya Bedi =

1985 film

- Directed by: Dorai–Bhagavan
- Written by: T. R. Subba Rao
- Produced by: Ramesh; Richy; Venkatesh Babu
- Starring: Anant Nag; Lakshmi; K. S. Ashwath
- Cinematography: R. Chittibabu; C. Mahendra
- Edited by: P. Bhaktavatsala
- Music by: Rajan–Nagendra
- Production company: Sri Mantralaya Enterprises
- Release date: 1985
- Running time: 143 minutes
- Country: India
- Language: Kannada

Bidugadeya Bedi ( transl. Seeking Freedom) is a 1985 Indian Kannada-language film, directed by Dorai–Bhagavan, based on the novel of the same name by T. R. Subba Rao. The film stars Anant Nag and Lakshmi.

The film's score and songs were composed by Rajan–Nagendra.

== Plot ==
Despite her father's objection, a young and beautiful daughter of a millionaire elopes with a poor man and faces lots of hardship. The story revolves around how her destiny takes its course.

== Cast ==
- Anant Nag as Shantaram
- Lakshmi as Gowri
- K. S. Ashwath as Sanjeeva Rao
- Dinesh
- Thimmayya
- Bharath Kumar
- Master Sanjay as Chandru
- Umashri as Flora
- Kanchana as Ratna
- Vijaya Ranjini
- Mandeep Roy
- Dingri Nagaraj as Ranganna

== Soundtrack ==
The music was composed by the Rajan–Nagendra duo, with lyrics by R. N. Jayagopal.

Track listing
No.	Title	Singer(s)	Length
1.	"Naguva Hoovellavu"	S. P. Balasubrahmanyam	04:42
2.	"Eno Hosa Santhoshade"	S. P. Balasubrahmanyam, S. Janaki	04:45
3.	"Manasugala Savi Milama"	S. P. Balasubrahmanyam, S. Janaki	04:35
4.	"Olavina Sarigama"	S. P. Balasubrahmanyam, S. Janaki	04:41
