= Ramarajyadalli Rakshasaru =

- VCD cover
- Directed by: D. Rajendra Babu
- Written by: B. L. Venu
- Screenplay by: D. Rajendra Babu
- Produced by: K. C. N. Mohan
- Starring: Shankar Nag; Anant Nag; Sonika Gil; Gayathri
- Cinematography: B. S. Basavaraj
- Edited by: K. Balu
- Music by: M. Ranga Rao
- Production company: Pragathi Enterprises
- Release date: 19 April 1990
- Country: India
- Language: Kannada

Ramarajyadalli Rakshasaru (Kannada: ರಾಮರಾಜ್ಯದಲ್ಲಿ ರಾಕ್ಷಸರು) is a 1990 Indian Kannada film, directed by D. Rajendra Babu and produced by K. C. N. Mohan. The film stars Shankar Nag, Anant Nag, Sonika Gil and Gayathri in the lead roles. The film has musical score by M. Ranga Rao.

== Summary ==
Surya, a newspaper editor, exposes the scams of a corrupt contractor who is later arrested by his brother, Chandra. Soon, the contractor seeks revenge against them.

== Cast ==
- Shankar Nag as Inspector Chandrashekhar
- Anant Nag as Editor Surya
- Sonika Gill as Shambhavi
- Gayathri
- Shashikumar as Deepu
- Doddanna as Kalinga Rao
- Sudheer
- Ayyappa
- Lakshman
- Prakash Raj
- Pandari Bai
- Abhinaya
- Sihi Kahi Geetha as Kapila
- Baby Rekha
- Ramesh Bhat
- Sadashiva Brahmavar
- Bank Janardhan
- Krishne Gowda
- Girija Lokesh
- Shani Mahadevappa
- M. S. Karanth
- Negro Johnny
