= Ondanondu Kaladalli =

1978 Indian Kannada film by Girish Karnad

- Poster
- Directed by: Girish Karnad
- Written by: Krishna Basaruru; Girish Karnad
- Screenplay by: Krishna Basaruru; Girish Karnad
- Produced by: G. N. Lakshmipathy; K. N. Narayan
- Starring: Shankar Nag; Sundar Krishna Urs; Akshatha Rao
- Cinematography: Apurba Kishore Bir
- Edited by: P. Bhaktavatsalam
- Music by: Bhaskar Chandavarkar
- Production company: L. N. Combines
- Release date: 1978
- Running time: 137 minutes
- Country: India
- Language: Kannada

Ondanondu Kaladalli ( transl. Once Upon a Time) is a 1978 Indian Kannada-language epic film co-written and directed by Girish Karnad with soundtrack by Bhaskar Chandavarkar, starring Shankar Nag and Akshatha Rao in their debut. Through this movie, Kavita Krishnamurthy started her singing career as playback singer. The film has influences of the early samurai films of Japanese director Akira Kurosawa, to whom Karnad has reportedly acknowledged his indebtedness.

The film won the 1978 National Film Award for Best Feature Film in Kannada "For delineating the code of warrior's ethics in a medieval setting with a modern vision. The film has excellent outdoor photography, high standard of acting and an eye-catching decor" as cited by the Jury. Shankar Nag received the "Best Actor : Silver Peacock Award" at the 7th International Film Festival of India for his work in the film.

The movie was released at The Guild Theatre, 50 Rockefeller Plaza on 17 May 1982. Vincent Canby, the chief film critic of The New York Times, called the movie "that is both exotic as well as surprising in view of all the bodies on the ground at the end, sweet natured!".

The film was subtitled into English for its American premiere on 18 October 1995 in Shriver Hall at the Johns Hopkins University as part of the 1995 Milton S. Eisenhower Symposium "Framing Society : A Century of Cinema".

== Plot ==
Gandugali (Shankar Nag) is a mercenary who comes across a band of soldiers on the trail of a couple of wounded enemy soldiers. He ends up rescuing them and is taken to their chieftain who hires him to train his soldiers to fight the chieftain's brother — his enemy. While there, Gandugali befriends the son of the chieftain's eldest brother, Jayakeshi, who is consigned to tending to cattle by his uncle. Jayakeshi asks Gandugali to help him reclaim his land and reinstate him as the chief. Gandugali refuses saying he is only a mercenary and that the youngster has no money to offer.

Gandugali helps the chieftain earn minor victories against his brother, much to the envy of the chief's commander. After one battle where Gandugali manages to steal the enemy's cattle, on the day of a festival, the commander of the enemy Peramadi (Sundar Krishna Urs) ends up trapped by Gandugali and his men. Gandugali releases him saying that he did not wish to shed any blood on a festival day.

Gandugali returns to his chief with the cattle only to realise that the chief and the commander are set against him for releasing Peramadi. The chief refuses to see him and the commander assigns men to keep an eye on him. That night an attempt is made on Gandugali's life, but the men looking out kill the assassin. Gandugali is furious when he realises that men had been assigned to keep an eye on him. Gandugali also realises that now with Peramadi defeated they don't have anything to fear or any need for him. He collects his salary and leaves in anger.

On the way he is confronted by Peramadi who challenges him to a duel. After a long fight where both end up exhausted, Peramadi tells him that it was his son who was out to kill Gandugali; his chief had humiliated him for losing the cattle and being defeated by Gandugali and believes that Gandugali killed him. Peramadi swears to wipe out the whole family of the chiefs including Jayakeshi. Gandugali swears to hunt him down and kill him wherever he is if anything happens to Jayakeshi. Finally, Peramadi makes a deal with Gandugali to help him destroy the family in return for letting Jayakeshi go.

The next few days they send out a warning and a challenge to the chiefs which unites them and their armies. Slowly, Peramadi and Gandugali isolate the chiefs, first by scaring away half the army and then killing some. On the way to the final decisive battle, Peramadi tells Gandugali that if he died in the battle, he would not hold himself to the promise of sparing Jaykeshi and kill him. Gandugali, knowing that Peramadi was not to be trusted, ensures that Jaykeshi is hidden.

In the final battle, they destroy the chiefs' armies and Gandugali kills the commander in a duel. Jaykeshi escapes from his hideout to fight, but holes up with some soldiers who hedge their bets on him becoming the next chief. Gandugali, having realised that Jaykeshi has escaped, comes down to the palace looking for him and ends up facing his old chief. He refuses to kill him saying that he was his servant and ate his salt, and his deal with Peramadi was only to help him get to them. The chief, however, attacks him at an opportune moment, fatally injuring him. Peramadi comes in after killing his chief (the younger brother) and kills the older chief. He sounds the bugle to signal the end of the war. Jaykeshi runs down to the palace on hearing it. On seeing Gandugali dead, he breaks down near his corpse. Peramadi comes from behind and raises his sword to kill him, but Jaykeshi escapes after being warned. Peramadi realises that Jaykeshi was crying over Gandugali and, after a change of heart, reinstates him as the chief and walks away.

== Cast ==
- Shankar Nag as Gandugali
- Sunder Krishna Urs as Permadi
- Sundar Raj as Commander of Gandugali's Army
- Akshatha Rao as Savantri
- Sushilendra Joshi as Jayakeshi
- Ajit Saldanha as Iraga, Permadi's Son
- Rekha Sabnis as Permadi's Wife
- Anil Thakkar as Kapardi Nayaka
- Vasant Rao as Maranayaka

== Soundtrack ==
Ondanondu Kaladalli

Soundtrack album by Bhaskar Chandavarkar
- Released: 1978
- Genre: Feature film soundtrack
- Label: Saregama

The title song is the only solo song in the entire movie and it is the first film song of singer Kavita Krishnamurthy.

No.	Title	Lyrics	Singer(s)	Length
1.	"Ondanondu Kaaladalli"	Chandrashekhara Kambara	Kavitha Krishnamurthy
2.	"Bicchugatthiya Bhantana"	Chandrashekhara Kambara	Chorus

== Reception ==
The films is regarded as one of the finest Indian martial arts films ever made, the movie has some fascinating stunt scenes, involving Kalaripayattu. With wide tracking photography, great shots of the Malenadu forests and excellent detailing, Ondanondu Kaladalli is an epic masterpiece.

A critic from The New York Times wrote that "Once Upon a Time is something more than a simple action film, though. Gandugali, as played by Shankar Nag, who has a lot of the force and humor of the younger Toshiro Mifune, and Permadi, played by Sunder Krishna Urs, are most appealing characters, doing their honorable best in a world that does not reward honor, only victory".

== Awards ==
7th International Film Festival of India

- "Best Actor : Silver Peacock Award" - Shankar Nag

26th National Film Awards

- Best Feature Film in Kannada - Girish Karnad and L. N. Combines

Karnataka State Film Awards

- Best Kannada Film - 1978-79
- Best Supporting Actor – Sundar Krishna Urs
- Best Editing – P. Bhakthavathsalam
- Best Sound Recording – S. P. Ramanathan

Filmfare Awards South

- Best Film
- Best Director — Girish Karnad

International Film Festival of India

- Ondanondu Kaladalli was screened at the 7th IFFI competition section.
- Ondanondu Kaladalli was also screened at 14th IFFI Homage to Shankar Nag.
