= Gayatri (actress) =

Indian actress (born 1960)

Gayatri Nag
- Born: 23 April 1960 (age 66); Bombay, Bombay State, India
- Occupation: Actress
- Spouse: Anant Nag (m. 1987)
- Children: 1
- Relatives: Shankar Nag (Brother-in-law); Arundhati Nag (co-sister)

Gayatri (born 23 April 1960) is a former Indian actress from Punjab who is known for heroine roles in Kannada movies like Auto Raja (1980), Vasantha Geetha (1980), Sukha Samsarakke Hanneradu Sutragalu (1984), Jwaalamukhi (1985) and Shwetha Gulabi (1985). She is married to actor Anant Nag.

== Personal life ==
Gayatri married popular Kannada actor Anant Nag on 9 April 1987. They have a daughter, Aditi.

== Filmography ==
Year	Title	Language	Role	Notes
1972	Victoria No. 203	Munni	Hindi	Child actor
1976	Tapasya	Chanda	Hindi	
1978	Mera Rakshak	Radha Rai	Hindi	
1978	Safed Haathi	Rani	Hindi	
1978	Atithee	Rajni	Hindi	
1979	Muqaddar Ka Sikandar		Hindi	
1980	Sunayana	Sushma	Hindi	
1980	Thodisi Bewafaii	Veena	Hindi	
1980	Auto Raja	Rani/Bhavani	Kannada	
1980	Vasantha Geetha	Geetha	Kannada	
1980	Aarada Gaaya		Kannada	
1980	Rusthum Jodi	Usha	Kannada	
1980	Mogudu Kaavali	Krishnaveni	Telugu	
1980	Pelli Gola		Telugu	
1981	Kula Puthra	Radha	Kannada	
1981	Hanabalavo Janabalavo		Kannada	
1982	Auto Raja	Rani/Bhavani	Tamil	
1984	Indina Ramayana		Kannada	Cameo
1984	Makkaliralavva Mane Thumba		Kannada	Cameo
1984	Sukha Samsarakke Hanneradu Suthragalu	Jayalakshmi	Kannada	
1985	Olave Baduku	Hema	Kannada	
1985	Khiladi Aliya	Sudha	Kannada	
1985	Maanava Daanava	Deepa	Kannada	
1985	Maha Purusha		Kannada	
1985	Hendthi Beku Hendthi	Girija	Kannada	
1985	Shwetha Gulabi	Shwetha	Kannada	
1985	Jwaalamukhi	V. Tejaswini	Kannada	
1985	Ade Kannu	Kamala	Kannada	
1985	Vajra Mushti	Rajini	Kannada	
1986	Preethi	Preethi	Kannada	
1986	Rasthe Raja		Kannada	
1986	Sigappu Malargal	Gayatri	Tamil	
1987	Thayi	Savitri	Kannada	
1987	Agni Parva	Vasundhara	Kannada	
1988	Choopulu Kalasina Subhavela	Lalitha	Telugu	
1989	Abhimana		Kannada	
1989	Ramarajyadalli Rakshasaru	Annapoorna	Kannada	

== See also ==
- List of Indian film actresses
- Cinema of Karnataka
- Cinema of India
