= Makkaliralavva Mane Thumba =

- Directed by: T. S. Nagabharana
- Screenplay by: Shankar Nag; Somu
- Story by: Shankar Nag; Somu
- Produced by: Durga Dattha Enterprises
- Starring: Anant Nag; Lakshmi; Shankar Nag; Gayathri
- Cinematography: Kulashekhar
- Edited by: P. Bhaktavatsalam
- Music by: G. K. Venkatesh
- Production company: Durga Dattha Enterprises
- Distributed by: KCN Movies
- Release date: 1984
- Running time: 136 minutes
- Country: India
- Language: Kannada

Makkaliralavva Mane Thumba is a 1984 Kannada-language drama film directed by T. S. Nagabharana and written by Shankar Nag and Somu. The film had an ensemble cast including Anant Nag, Shankar Nag, Lakshmi and Gayathri.

The film, produced by Durga Dattha Enterprises, had original score and songs composed by G. K. Venkatesh.

== Cast ==
- Anant Nag as Rajashekhar
- Shankar Nag as Shankar
- Lakshmi as Usharani
- Gayathri
- Ramesh Bhat
- Balakrishna
- Master Manjunath
- Uma Shivakumar
- Sudheer
- Mandeep Roy
- Dinesh as Maruthi Rao
- Master Kishan Kallianpur
- Master Santhosh
- Baby Meera
- Baby Mamatha
- S. P. Balasubrahmanyam as himself

== Soundtrack ==
The music was composed by G. K. Venkatesh, with lyrics by Purandara Dasa and Doddarange Gowda.

Track listing
| No. | Title | Music | Singer(s) | Length |
|---|---|---|---|---|
| 1. | "Makkaliralavva Mane Thumba" | | S. P. Balasubrahmanyam |
| 2. | "Oh Usha Usha" | | S. P. Balasubrahmanyam |
| 3. | "Namma Gulabi" | | S. P. Balasubrahmanyam |
| 4. | "Nanna Chinna" | | Vani Jairam |
| 5. | "Baala Elu Beelu" | | Jayachandran |
| 6. | "Yaadava Nee Baa" | Sri Purandara Dasaru | Bhimsen Joshi |
