= Benkiya Bale =

- Lobby card
- Directed by: Dorai–Bhagavan
- Based on: Benkiya Bale by T. R. Subba Rao
- Produced by: Ramesh; Richy; Ramarathnam; Sharadamba; Shashi Prakash
- Starring: Anant Nag; Lakshmi; Balakrishna; Thoogudeepa Srinivas
- Cinematography: R. Chittibabu
- Edited by: P. Bhaktavatsalam
- Music by: Rajan–Nagendra
- Production company: Sri Manthralaya Art Combines
- Release date: 1983
- Running time: 137 minutes
- Country: India
- Language: Kannada

Benkiya Bale ( transl. Fire Trap) is a 1983 Indian Kannada-language film, directed by the Dorai–Bhagavan duo. It is based on the novel of the same name by T. R. Subba Rao. The film stars Anant Nag, Lakshmi, K. S. Ashwath and Thoogudeepa Srinivas.

== Cast ==
- Anant Nag Narasimha Murthy
- Lakshmi Rukku/Rukmini
- K. S. Ashwath
- Vajramuni
- Balakrishna
- Dinesh
- Thoogudeepa Srinivas
- Musuri Krishnamurthy
- Mysore Lokesh
- Mandeep Roy

== Soundtrack ==
The music was composed by Rajan–Nagendra, with lyrics by Chi. Udaya Shankar. All the songs composed for the film were received extremely well and considered evergreen songs. Rajan-Nagendra reused the tune of Olida Jeeva for the 1986 Telugu movie Rendu Rella Aaru as Viraha Veena. That song is based on Hamsanandi raga.

Track listing
No.	Title	Singer(s)	Length
1.	"Nanagagi Banda"	S. P. Balasubrahmanyam
2.	"Ninna Naguvu"	S. P. Balasubrahmanyam, S. Janaki
3.	"Olida Jeeva"	S. P. Balasubrahmanyam, S. Janaki
4.	"Bisiladarenu Maleyadarenu"	S. P. Balasubrahmanyam
5.	"Bisiladarenu Maleyadarenu"	S. Janaki
