= Jeevakke Jeeva =

- Directed by: K. S. R. Das
- Written by: M. Narendra Babu (dialogues)
- Screenplay by: Ma Ra; J. Balasubramanyam
- Story by: Ma Ra; J. Balasubramanyam
- Produced by: S. V. Srikanth
- Starring: Anant Nag; Shankar Nag; Saritha; Dwarakish
- Cinematography: V. K. Kannan
- Edited by: D. Venkatarathnam
- Music by: Rajan–Nagendra
- Production company: Devi Gayathri Rupalaya
- Distributed by: Devi Gayathri Rupalaya
- Release date: 1981
- Running time: 145 min
- Country: India
- Language: Kannada

Jeevakke Jeeva is a 1981 Indian Kannada-language film, directed by K. S. R. Das and produced by S. V. Srikanth. The film stars Anant Nag, Shankar Nag, Saritha and Dwarakish. The film has musical score by Rajan–Nagendra.

== Cast ==
- Anant Nag as Sagar
- Shankar Nag as Jaggu "Raja"
- Saritha as Geetha / Gayatri
- Dwarakish as Thippe
- Kanchana as Seetha
- Vajramuni as Shivaram
- T. N. Balakrishna
- Sampath as Lakshman Rao
- Shivaprakash
- Rajasulochana
- Jyothi Lakshmi as Mayadevi
- Thoogudeepa Srinivas in a cameo
- Gangadhar as Santosh, Seetha's husband (cameo)
- Pandari Bai as Gayatri's mother (cameo)
- Jayagopal in a cameo
- B. Hanumanthachar
- Shani Mahadevappa as Diwakar

== Soundtrack ==
The music was composed by Rajan–Nagendra.

No.	Song	Singers	Lyrics	Length (m:ss)
1	"Elle Haadali"	S. P. Balasubrahmanyam	Chi. Udaya Shankar	04:28
2	"Preethi Maadabeku"	S. P. Balasubrahmanyam	Chi. Udaya Shankar	04:30
3	"Thani Thandana"	S. P. Balasubrahmanyam, S. P. Sailaja	Chi. Udaya Shankar	04:13
4	"Madhura"	S. Janaki	Chi. Udaya Shankar	04:14
5	"Thangaali"	S. Janaki, S. P. Balasubrahmanyam	Chi. Udaya Shankar	04:34
