= Parameshi Prema Prasanga =

- Directed by: Ramesh Bhat
- Written by: Somu
- Screenplay by: Shankar Nag
- Produced by: Ramesh Bhat
- Starring: Ramesh Bhat; Arundhati Nag; Ananth Nag; Shankar Nag; Master Manjunath
- Cinematography: Kulashekhar
- Edited by: P. Bhaktavatsalam
- Music by: G. K. Venkatesh
- Distributed by: Gayathri Chithralaya
- Release date: 1985
- Running time: 124 minutes
- Country: India
- Language: Kannada

Parameshi Prema Prasanga is a 1985 Indian Kannada language film, directed by and starring Ramesh Bhat, with Arundhati Nag, Master Manjunath, Ananth Nag, Shankar Nag and C. R. Simha.

== Plot ==
Parameshi (played by Ramesh Bhat) is happily married to Ramamani (played by Arundhati Nag), and they have a son called Paapu. He works for a small-time firm dealing in wallpaper distribution, his colleagues there are gossip mongers. One amongst them is Simha, an office peon, who indulges in gambling bets with the employees of a leading law firm on Bangalore's prestigious MG Road. Parameshi, being a simpleton, is unaware of what his colleagues are up to. He falls prey to Simha's bet and ends up going out with a female colleague. Ramamani does not like Parameshi's going out with another woman and confronts him. Parameshi scoffs and suggests there is nothing wrong with socializing and he would be okay if Ramamani also goes out with another guy.

To teach Parameshi a lesson, Ramamani enacts a drama of having an affair with the office peon. Parameshi falls for the trick, gets very upset, and takes to drinking alcohol. Before Ramamani could tell him the truth, Simha, the office peon, sends an anonymous letter to Parameshi, confirming Ramamani's affair. Distraught with his wife, Parameshi deserts her and the kid, and leaves to an unknown destination without any warning.

Ramamani now has to face reality. She takes up odd jobs to support herself and a monk living next door. Time passes by and her son goes to the city. Parameshi meets Ramamani in a chance encounter after which he files a case in court for his son's custody. Ramamani seeks lawyer Paapanna's (Ananth Nag) help to fight the case. Ramamani and Parameshi face each other in court and the court awards Paapu's custody to him. When Parameshi comes to pick up his son, he also decides to get back with his wife.

== Cast ==
- Ramesh Bhat as Parameshi
- Arundhati Nag as Ramamani
- Ananth Nag as Papanna
- Shankar Nag
- Master Manjunath
- C. R. Simha

== Awards ==
- Karnataka State Film Awards 1984-85
  - Best Child Actor (Male) - Master Manjunath
