= C.B.I. Shankar =

- VCD cover
- Directed by: P. Nanjundappa
- Screenplay by: K. V. Raju
- Story by: K. V. Raju, P. Nanjundappa
- Produced by: Krishna Raju
- Starring: Shankar Nag
- Cinematography: Mallikarjun
- Edited by: K. Balu
- Music by: Hamsalekha
- Production company: Swarnagiri Films
- Distributed by: K. S. S. Combines
- Release date: 28 June 1989
- Running time: 134 minutes
- Country: India
- Language: Kannada

C.B.I. Shankar is a 1989 Indian Kannada language drama film directed by P. Nanjundappa. It stars Shankar Nag in the title role as Shankar, an officer with the CBI, who investigates a murder case closed down by the local police. The supporting cast features Devaraj, Doddanna, Vajramuni, Suman Ranganathan and Shashikumar. The film was a blockbuster and further established Nag as a leading actor in Kannada cinema.

== Plot ==
Sub-inspector Galappa Doddamani stumbles onto Sathya's filming location in a forest, for the film CBI Shankar. The president of the local Zilla Parishad Narayana Gowda (Vajramuni) reaches the spot with a businessman, Amar (Devaraj), and grants the crew permission to continue filming. Following Gowda's inappropriate behavior with Tara (as herself), the film's female lead, at a party hosted by the film producer, she storms out of the party and walks out of the film. Sathya, also the film's director, persists Amar's sister Asha (Suman Ranganathan) to replace her, to which an initially hesitant Asha agrees in her brother, Amar's absence, who had other plans for her.

Amar, away from home strikes a business deal with an agency with the help of Radha, who has a crush on him. Filming with CBI Shankar, Asha, while performing a scene in the film, falls unconscious on seeing blood-stained clothes and backs out of the film. Sathya woos her and convinces her to overturn her decision, and is successful. Amar, on returning home, is furious to find Asha acting and confronts Sathya. He gets the police to the filming location to arrest Sathya on grounds of having forced Asha to act in the film. Sathya then reveals his real identity of Shankar, a CBI officer who, with his team have come down to the town to unearth the murder case of Santosh (Shashikumar), having been closed down previously by the local police calling it a suicide.

In a series of flashback sequences as narrated to Shankar by the potential suspects as part of the investigation, it is seen that Santosh was a dancer who was given a ticket by a political party to contest at the local Zilla Parishad elections. Foreseeing his win, the opposition political party led by Gowda plans on giving him cash in return for his withdrawal. Reluctant to withdraw, Gowda asks Bullet Basya (Sudheer) to "deal with Santosh". Basya tails him and involves him in a fistfight, and shockingly finds Amar stabbing Santosh from behind, killing him. Cut to the present, Basya reveals to Shankar that it was Amar who killed Santosh for the reason that the latter pursued Amar's sister. The CBI team proceed to arrest a newlywed Amar only to find him stabbed by Radha, his wife, who reveals that she did so, to avenge her ex-husband's murder by Amar, who had murdered him owing to a business-related dispute. An unhurt Amar manages to escape, is pursued by Shankar and handed him over to the police.

== Cast ==
- Shankar Nag as Sathya/Shankar
- Suman Ranganathan as Asha
- Shashikumar as Santosh
- Vajramuni as Narayana Gowda
- Devaraj as Amar
- Doddanna as Sub-inspector Galappa Doddamani
- Avinash as Vikram
- Sudheer as Bullet Basya
- Lohithaswa
- Dinesh as Subramanya
- K. V. Manjayya
- Kunigal Nagabhushan as Seenappa
- Tara as herself in cameo appearance
- Rockline Venkatesh (uncredited)

== Soundtrack ==
C.B.I. Shankar

Soundtrack album by Hamsalekha
- Released: 25 April 1989
- Genre: Feature film soundtrack
- Length: 22:40
- Label: Lahari Music

Hamsalekha composed the background score for the film and the soundtrack. The soundtrack album consists of five tracks.

Track listing
No.	Title	Lyrics	Singer(s)	Length
1.	"Idu Maayabajaaru"	Hamsalekha	S. P. Balasubrahmanyam, Chithra	4:37
2.	"Kaada Noda Hode"	Hamsalekha	S. P. Balasubrahmanyam, Chithra	4:18
3.	"Geethanjali Pushpanjali"	Hamsalekha	S. P. Balasubrahmanyam, Chithra	4:31
4.	"Vote For Vote For"	Hamsalekha	S. P. Balasubrahmanyam, Manjula Gururaj	4:31
5.	"Ek Do Teen Chaar"	Hamsalekha	Latha Hamsalekha	4:43
Total length:				22:40
