= Ondu Hennu Aaru Kannu =

1980 film by V. Madhusudhana Rao

- Directed by: V. Madhusudhana Rao
- Story by: M. D. Sundar
- Produced by: C. H. Prakash Rao
- Starring: Ananth Nag; Shankar Nag; Ambareesh; Fatafat Jayalaxmi
- Cinematography: S. S. Lal
- Edited by: Ravi
- Production company: Maheeja Films
- Release date: 1980
- Running time: 133 min.
- Country: India
- Language: Kannada

Ondu Hennu Aaru Kannu (transl. A girl and six eyes) is a 1980 Indian Kannada-language film directed by V. Madhusudhana Rao, produced by C. H. Prakash Rao and written by M. D. Sundar. The film has an ensemble cast including Ananth Nag, Shankar Nag, Ambareesh, Fatafat Jayalaxmi and Balakrishna. The film had a musical score by S. Rajeswara Rao.

== Cast ==
- Anant Nag as Ajay
- Shankar Nag as Vijay
- Ambareesh as Ravi
- Fatafat Jayalaxmi as Radha
- K. S. Ashwath as Ajay and Vijay's father
- Leelavathi as Rajamma
- Thoogudeepa Srinivas as Rudrayya
- Uma Shivakumar as Suvarna
- T. N. Balakrishna as Pappanna
- Shakti Prasad as Prabhakar
- Musuri Krishnamurthy as Babu Rao
- Chindodi Leela as Nurse Nagamma
- Ceylon Manohar as Crocodile
- Anuradha as Rani

== Soundtrack ==
The music of the film was composed by S. Rajeswara Rao with lyrics penned by Chi. Udaya Shankar.

Ondu Hennu Aaru Kannu

Soundtrack album to Haddina Kannu by S. Rajeswara Rao
- Released: 1980
- Language: Kannada

=== Track list ===
#	Title	Singer(s)
1	"Ondu Eradu Mooru"	S. P. Balasubrahmanyam, Anand, U. Ramakrishna
2	"Sannu Jaaridanamma"	S. P. Balasubrahmanyam, U. Ramakrishna
3	"Hadinaru Endare"	Vani Jairam
4	"Neene Neene"	S. P. Balasubrahmanyam, P. Susheela
5	"Ondu Hennu Illi"	P. Susheela
6	"Nimbeya Hannantha"	P. Susheela
