= Sundarakanda (1991 film) =

- VCD cover
- Directed by: K. V. Raju
- Produced by: Sridevi
- Starring: Shankar Nag; Shivaranjini; Devaraj; Jayanti; Avinash; Doddanna; Jaggesh
- Cinematography: J.G. Krishna
- Edited by: Murali, Ramaiah
- Music by: Sangeetha Raja
- Production company: Sri Vijayalakshmi Cine Arts
- Release date: 21 February 1991
- Running time: 142
- Country: India
- Language: Kannada

Sundarakanda is 1991 Indian Kannada-language action thriller film written and directed by K. V. Raju and produced by Sridevi under Sri Vijayalakshmi Cine Arts. The film stars Shankar Nag and Shivaranjini, with Devaraj, Jaggesh and Avinash playing supporting roles. This film was the last movie of Shankar Nag as an actor, and it was released posthumously.

== Plot ==
A journalist is set to kill two dishonest MLAs, but they end up killing him first. Later, the journalist's wife gets separated from one of her two sons and both the sons grow up with a motive to avenge their father's death.

== Cast ==
- Shankar Nag as Inspector Shakthi
- Shivaranjini as Kiran, Shakthi's lover
- Devaraj as Shiva
- Tara as Basanthi
- Avinash as Press Editor
- Jayanti as Editor's wife Shanthidevi
- Mysore Lokesh Bhootha
- Doddanna as Commissioner
- Jaggesh as Ravi
- Sudheer as Basya
- Lohithashwa as Bhujanga
- GK Govinda Rao as Jayaprakash
- KV Manjayya as Doctor
- Rockline Venkatesh
- Killer Venkatesh
- Aravind as Murthy
- Neegro Johny
- Ma Anand
- Sadashiva Brahmavar
- Bank Janardhan
