= Ganesha (film) =

- VCD cover
- Directed by: Dinesh Baboo
- Written by: Dinesh Baboo
- Produced by: Srinivasulu Hospet
- Starring: Jaggesh; Anant Nag
- Cinematography: Dinesh Baboo
- Edited by: K. Eshwar
- Music by: Manikanth Kadri
- Production company: Sri Sai Productions
- Release date: 16 November 2007
- Country: India
- Language: Kannada

Ganesha is a 2007 Indian Kannada-language comedy drama film directed by Dinesh Baboo and starring Jaggesh and Anant Nag.

== Cast ==
- Jaggesh as Ganesh
- Anant Nag as Rao Bahadur Shivaraj Patil
- Ranjani
- Ajay Rao as Shivu
- Rangayana Raghu
- Sharan
- Dharma
- Vanitha Vasu
- Vanishree
- Mandeep Roy
- Ramesh Bhat
- Joe Simon
- Rohith Nagesh
- Ramesh Pandit
- Yathiraj

== Production ==
The film was simultaneously made alongside Mr. Garagasa (2008), which shared the same crew and also starred Anant Nag.

== Music ==
The music is by Manikanth Kadri and features six songs, one remix and one theme. The audio launch for this film and Mr. Garagasa (2008) was held on 13 September 2007 at the G. M. Rejoyz auditorium in Bangalore.

Track listing
No.	Title	Lyrics	Singer(s)	Length
1.	"Belli Chukki"	Raghu Urdigar	Rajesh Krishnan	4:48
2.	"Belli Chukki (remix)"	Raghu Urdigar	Rajesh Krishnan	5:09
3.	"Chakora Chakora"	Kaviraj	Rajesh Krishnan, Ujjayni Roy	5:29
4.	"Ganesh Theme"	—	—	2:53
5.	"Hasirina Tampali"	Ram Narayan	V. Pradeep Kumar	5:21
6.	"Moodadalli Banna"	Jayanth Kaikini	Anuradha Bhat	5:10
7.	"Oduli Tumbidre"	Raghu Urdigar	V. Pradeep Kumar	5:35
Total length:				34:25

== Critical reception ==
R. G. Vijayasarathy of Rediff.com rated the film three out of five stars and wrote "Watch the film for the performances of Jaggesh and Anant Nag, and Dinesh Baboo's deft handling of the project. You can enjoy every moment of it.". A critic from IANS wrote: "Dinesh Baboo has experimented in his own novel way with Jaggesh in his new film Ganesha that is certainly an entertaining and a clean film. And Baboo has depended again on his regular and trusted actor Anant Nag in this film that stands out for its narration".
