= Nan Hendthi Chennagidale =

- VCD cover
- Directed by: Dinesh Babu
- Written by: Dinesh Babu
- Produced by: Chithra
- Starring: Sanketh Kashi; Anjali Takkar; Anant Nag
- Cinematography: P. K. H. Das
- Edited by: B. S. Kemparaj
- Music by: Rajesh Ramanath
- Production company: Bhavani Chithra
- Release date: 25 July 2000
- Running time: 126 minutes
- Country: India
- Language: Kannada

Nan Hendthi Chennagidale (transl. My Wife Is Fine) is a 2000 Indian Kannada-language comedy film written and directed by Dinesh Babu. It stars Sanketh Kashi, Anjani Takkar and Ananth Nag in the lead roles. K. S. Ashwath, Ramakrishna, Sharan and Umashree feature in supporting roles while Vishnuvardhan and Ramesh Aravind make special appearances. The film follows an insecure man whose distrust of his beautiful wife begins to strain their marriage, leading to misunderstandings and emotional turmoil.

Rajesh Ramanath scored music for the film, while P. K. H. Das served as the cinematographer and B. S. Kemparaj as the editor. The film was released theatrically on 25 July 2000.

== Plot ==
The film opens with a folk tale in which an old man and his granddaughter travel with a donkey. As they continue their journey, passersby criticise the man for either not riding the donkey, overloading it, or treating it unfairly, no matter what choice he makes. The tale serves as a framing device for the narrative.

Ramachandra "Ramu", an average-looking creative director at an advertising agency, marries the beautiful Seetha despite believing that he is not a suitable match for her. His insecurities are constantly reinforced by remarks from his colleagues and acquaintances, including Rangamma, a vegetable seller who has known him since childhood. Although Ramu's boss attempts to guide him through the early days of his married life and presents himself as happily married, Ramu becomes increasingly anxious about Seetha's loyalty.

Over time, Ramu's insecurity deepens through seemingly trivial incidents, such as Seetha complimenting a handsome model on television and the couple embarrassing themselves on a television compatibility show, Honeymoon Walkers, by failing to answer questions about each other correctly. Ramu eventually befriends Murali Krishna, a self-proclaimed womanizer who boasts that he can attract any woman within minutes. Ramu secretly asks Murali Krishna to test her loyalty, leading to criticism from his family and friends when they discover his actions. Hurt by his mistrust, Seetha leaves him and returns to her parents' home.

At the urging of her lawyer uncle, Seetha considers divorcing Ramu. Meanwhile, she joins the same company where Ramu works and becomes his superior, a development orchestrated by Ramu's boss and mother in an attempt to reconcile the couple. Unable to cope with the situation, Ramu tries to provoke Seetha's jealousy by spending time with a club dancer. However, matters take a serious turn when the dancer is found murdered, and Ramu becomes a suspect in the investigation led by officer Rajiv Vijay Raghav. Ramu is eventually cleared of all suspicion after marriage broker Raghupathi Iyengar confesses that he accidentally killed her during an altercation. Relieved to learn of Ramu's innocence, Seetha reconciles with him, and the couple reunites.

== Cast ==
- Sanketh Kashi as Ramachandra "Ramu"
- Anjani Takkar as Seetha
- Anant Nag as Ramu's boss
- K. S. Ashwath as Seetha's father
- Ramakrishna as Rajaram
- Ramesh Bhat as Raghupathi Iyengar, Marriage broker
- Sharan as Murali Krishna
- Mandeep Roy as Raja, employee in Ramu's company
- Rajendra Jatthi
- Pramod
- Mysore Jadhav as postman
- Umashree as Rangamma, a vegetable seller
- Padma Kumta as Ramu's mother
- Chitra Shenoy as Sumi, wife of Ramu's boss
- Vanishree as Sonia, Seetha's frnd
- Preethi as Shanti, club dancer
- Sindhu M. Naidu
- Sathya
- Vishnuvardhan in a cameo as Inspector Rajiv Vijay Raghav
- Ramesh Aravind in a cameo as himself
- Doddanna in a cameo as man on donkey
- Tennis Krishna in a cameo
- M. N. Lakshmi Devi in a cameo
- Mandya Ramesh as television host (uncredited)

== Production ==
Anjani Takkar, who previously acted in a Telugu film, made her Kannada debut through this film.

== Soundtrack ==
All the songs are composed and scored by Rajesh Ramanath.

S. No.	Song title	Singer(s)	Lyrics
1	"Nanna Hendthi"	Rajesh Krishnan	K. Kalyan
2	"Srirangadinda Srikrishna"	Nanditha	K. Kalyan
3	"Hunja Hunja"	Manjula Gururaj	K. Kalyan
4	"Maduve Madi Nodu"	Rajesh Krishnan	K. Kalyan
5	"Bhoomigondu Banna"	Rajesh Krishnan	K. Kalyan

== Reception ==
A critic from Chitraloka.com wrote that "This is side splitting and gives the best medicine - laughter. This has been possible for the presence of artistes like Ananthnag, Ramesh Aravind, Vishnuvardhan, Kashi and Umasri. All of them excel in their roles with ease and perfect time sense".
