= Auto Raja (1980 film) =

- Directed by: Vijay
- Written by: M. D. Sundar
- Screenplay by: M. D. Sundar
- Produced by: C. Jayaram
- Starring: Shankar Nag; Gayathri
- Cinematography: S. V. Srikanth
- Edited by: P. Bhaktavatsalam
- Music by: Rajan–Nagendra
- Distributed by: Sapthaswara Movie Makers
- Release date: 1980
- Running time: 149 minutes
- Country: India
- Language: Kannada

Auto Raja is a 1980 Indian Kannada-language romance film directed by Vijay, based on a screenplay by M. D. Sundar. The film was produced by Parvathamma Rajkumar's sister husband C. Jayaram under the banner of Sapthaswara Movie Makers. The film stars Shankar Nag and Gayathri in lead roles, while Dwarakeesh, Balakrishna and Leelavathi appear in other supporting roles. The film features original songs composed by the music duo Rajan–Nagendra. The cinematography of the film was handled by S. V. Srikanth. It is considered as one of the best commercial films in Kannada cinema and received cult status. The film was significant in heightening the stardom of Shankar Nag. The film was remade in 1981 in Telugu as Taxi Driver starring Krishnam Raju and in 1982 in Tamil with the same name starring Vijayakanth.

== Plot ==
Raja is a simple auto driver who lives with his mother and sister in Bangalore. One day he meets Rani, who introduces herself as a poor girl who works for Bhaskar Rao in his house. After a few meetings they express their love for each other. While they are courting each other, Raja finds out that Rani is actually Bhavani, Bhaskar Rao's only daughter and the heir to all his property.

Raja who dislikes the rich for he believes them to be arrogant, faces humiliation at Bhavani's birthday party by some of her guests. The discovery of Rani's real identity makes Raja stay away from her. Eventually both reconcile. Elsewhere we come to know that Bhaskar Rao is behind Bhavani's wealth. In order to achieve it, he has planned of getting her married to Psychiatrist Dr. Dinakar's son Sudhakar, a womanizer with whom he would equally share her property.

One day Bhavani stumbles upon an old woman - Mahalakshmi who recognizes Bhavani as her own daughter which confuses Bhavani. Upon narrating the incident to Bhaskar Rao, he tells Bhavani that he lost her mother and their previous house, all the photos in a fire accident. Bhavani tells this to Raja. He along with his friend manage to flee with Mahalakshmi from a mental hospital. Mahalakshmi then reveals that Bhaskar Rao is actually Bhavani's uncle. He had planned to kill their family for their money but only Bhavani's father died in the accident.

Bhavani's father had made a will saying that Bhavani's husband would get all the property after her marriage. Until then Mahalakshmi would be managing it. If they died, the property would go to the trusts, orphanages assigned by Bhavani's father. Due to this, Bhaskar Rao staged that Mahalakshmi has gone crazy after her husband's death and sent her to his ally - Dr. Dinakar's hospital and raised Bhavani as his daughter without revealing the truth to Bhavani.

In order to exact revenge on Bhaskar, Dinakar and Sudhakar, Bhavani acts like she has agreed to marry Sudhakar. Later she makes Dr. Dinakar go crazy by staging Sudhakar's death. Bhaskar Rao discovers everything and he along with Sudhakar, lock Bhavani and Mahalakshmi in their snake farm and force Bhavani to transfer her property to them. Raja comes to Bhavani and Mahalakshmi' s rescue. The film ends with a happy note of Raja and Bhavani singing in an auto.

== Cast ==
- Shankar Nag as Raja
- Gayathri as Rani / Bhavani
- Dwarakish as Raja's friend, a fellow auto driver
- Balakrishna as Dr. Dinakar, Sudhakar's father
- Thoogudeepa Srinivas as Bhaskar Rao, Bhavani's uncle
- Sundar Krishna Urs as Sudhakar
- Tiger Prabhakar as Rodrigues
- Leelavathi as Mahalakshmi, Bhavani's mother
- Musuri Krishnamurthy as Mahalinga
- Padma as Sudha, Raja's sister
- K. S. Ashwath as Bhavani's father
- Papamma as Raja and Sudha's mother
- K S Prakash Rao as Inspector of Police Station in the intro scene

== Soundtrack ==
The film's soundtrack was composed by the famed duo Rajan–Nagendra with lyrics penned by Chi. Udayashankar. The Tamil remake retained two songs from this movie - "Naliva Gulabi Hoove" as "Malare Enna Kolam" and "Nanna Aase Hannagi" as "Kanni Vannam". Rajan-Nagendra reused the latter tune for the 1983 Telugu movie Puli Bebbuli as "Parimalinchu Punnamilo".

Track#	Song	Singer(s)	Duration
1	"Hosa Baalu"	S. Janaki	
2	"Nanna Aase Hannagi"	S.P. Balasubrahmanyam, S. Janaki	4:19
3	"Paramaathma Aadisidante"	S.P. Balasubrahmanyam, Ramani	
4	"Naliva Gulabi Hoove"	S.P. Balasubrahmanyam	4:05

== Legacy ==
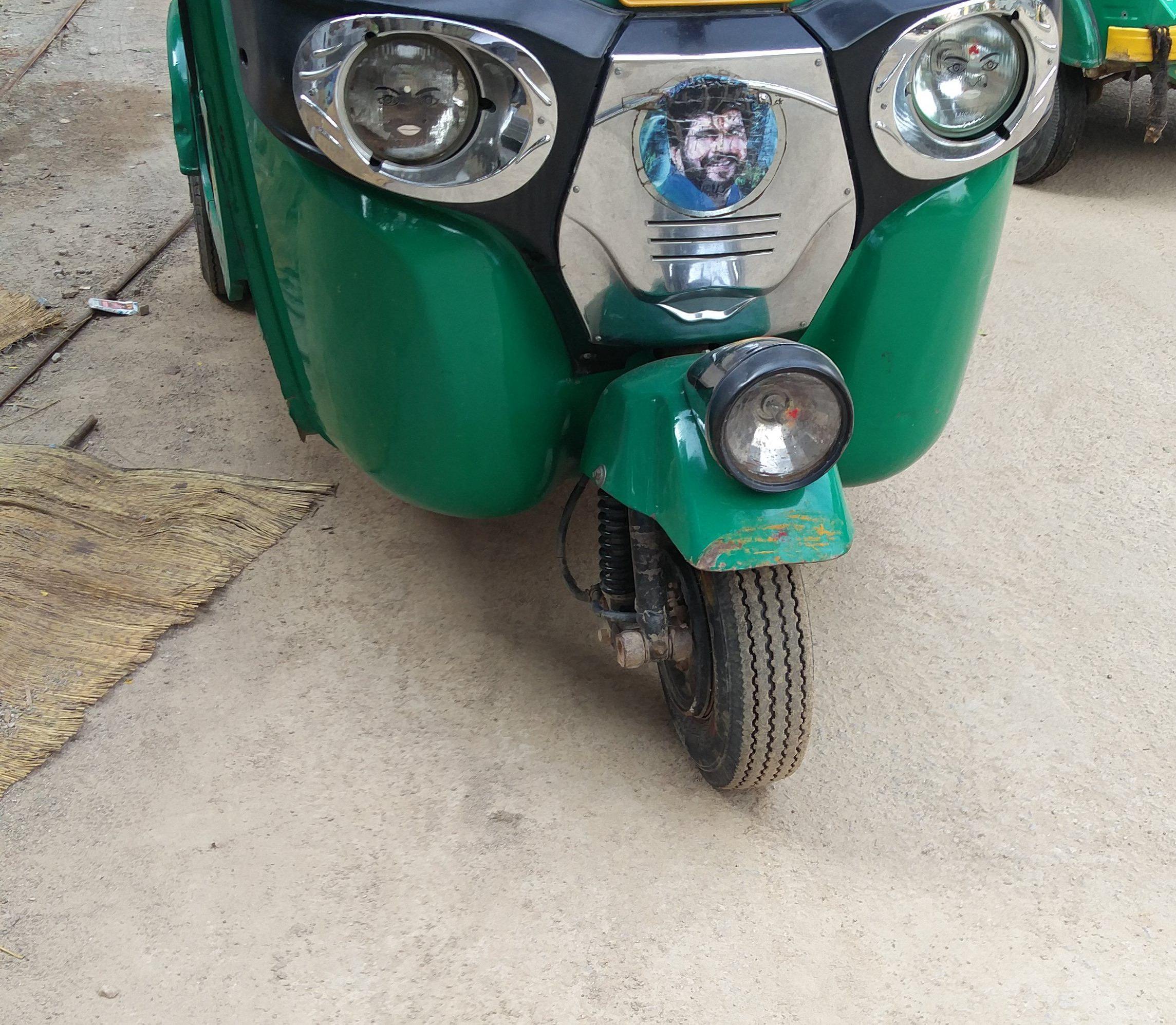
Shankar Nag Photo on Auto in Bengaluru

Shankar Nag, who acted in the role of Raja, the humble auto driver, is credited with bringing a certain dignity to the profession of auto rickshaw drivers. Four decades after the movie release too, Shankar Nag's photo adorns auto rickshaws across Karnataka.
