= Lalach =

Laalach
- Directed by: Shankar Nag
- Written by: Shankar Nag
- Based on: Minchina Ota by Shankar Nag
- Produced by: Prem Bedi
- Starring: Vinod Mehra; Bindiya Goswami; Ranjeet; Pran
- Cinematography: Navroze Contractor
- Music by: Bappi Lahiri
- Release date: 1983
- Country: India
- Language: Hindi

Laalach (transl. Greed) is 1983 Indian Hindi drama film directed by Shankar Nag starring Vinod Mehra, Bindiya Goswami, Ranjeet, Pran, Kajal Kiran and Anant Nag in lead roles. The film is a remake of director's own 1980 Kannada movie Minchina Ota.

== Cast ==
- Vinod Mehra as Kishore
- Bindiya Goswami as Sarita
- Ranjeet as Shaikh Nabi Mohammed "Nabbu"
- Pran as David
- Anant Nag as DSP Saxena
- Kajal Kiran as Mrs. Sunita Saxena

== Soundtrack ==
The film's soundtrack was composed by Bappi Lahiri and lyrics was penned by Anjaan.

Song	Singer
"Gao Re Gao, Tali Bajao"	Kishore Kumar
"Mausam Mastana Hai, Dil Deewana Hai"	Kishore Kumar, Lata Mangeshkar
"Apni Gaadi Chalti Hai, Kya Kya Rang Badalti Hai" (Happy)	Kishore Kumar, Suresh Wadkar, Manna Dey
"Apni Gaadi Chalti Hai, Kya Kya Rang Badalti Hai" (Sad)	Manna Dey
"How Are You Munni Bai, How Are You"	Mahendra Kapoor, Chandrani Mukherjee
