= Minchina Ota (1980 film) =

- Film VCD cover
- Directed by: Shankar Nag
- Screenplay by: Mariyam Jetpurawala; Shankar Nag
- Produced by: Anant Nag; Shankar Nag
- Starring: Anant Nag; Shankar Nag; Priya Tendulkar; Lokanath; Ramesh Bhat
- Cinematography: B. C. Gowrishankar
- Edited by: P. Bhaktavatsalam
- Music by: Prabhakar Badri
- Production company: Sanketh
- Distributed by: Films International; Srinivas Pictures; Venkateshwara Pictures
- Release date: 1980
- Running time: 126 minutes
- Country: India
- Language: Kannada

Minchina Ota is a 1980 Indian Kannada language heist film directed by and starring Shankar Nag with his brother Anant Nag and Lokanath in pivotal roles. The supporting cast features Priya Tendulkar and Ramesh Bhat, who made his debut in the film.

The film was not a huge success at the box office but was a critical success and won multiple awards at the 1979–80 Karnataka State Film Awards including Second Best Film, Best Actor (Anant Nag) and Best Supporting Actor (Lokanath). It is seen as a milestone in the careers of the Nag brothers. It was remade in Hindi in 1983 by Shankar Nag himself as Lalach starring Vinod Mehra, Ranjit and Pran alongside Anant Nag with music by Bappi Lahiri.

== Plot ==
Katte and Prabhakar Rao "Tatha" are petty thieves who cannot seem to get a break in life. Their criminal past does not leave them wherever they go. To make it big, they resort to their past and start jumping unsuspecting passers by on National Highways and relieving them of their automobiles. Disassembling the auto parts, they sell them for money and often dupe people.

Soon their jig is up when one of their stolen vehicles breaks down and a mechanic, Tony D'Souza is brought for help. Seeing that money is a free flowing concept in this criminal life, Tony joins hands with this crime duo. Soon, the trio hits various spots and makes away with vehicles. During this process, they even manage to rope in another petty thief Manju, who is thieving to afford her sick mother's medical bills, into their criminal enterprise. Shortly afterwards, Tony and Manju get married.

The cops are hot on their trail for a good part of the film before finally clamping the trio down much to the delight of the pipe-smoking Inspector Nayak. As jailbirds, Katte and Thatha seem to have found their peace but not Tony. His desperate self is trying to get away from the chains that bind him. A prison break is planned and executed to almost perfection by the three. In the process, Thatha dies after accidentally falling off the high prison walls. Katte and Tony are killed in an encounter while trying to flee from the cops. The film ends with Manju, who at this stage is pregnant by Tony, vowing to raise the child in a good and healthy environment.

== Cast ==
- Anant Nag as Tony D'Souza
- Shankar Nag as Katte
- Lokanath as Prabhakar Rao "Thatha"
- Priya Tendulkar as Manju
- Ramesh Bhat as Inspector Nayak
- Mandeep Roy as Constable Thimmaiah
- Prakash
- B. R. Shivaramaiah
- Mysore Nagaraj
- Ranga
- Basavaraj Vali

== Soundtrack ==
Minchina Ota

Soundtrack album by Prabhakar Badri
- Genre: Feature film soundtrack
- Label: Saregama

Prabhakar Badri composed the soundtrack for the film with lyrics written by Rudramurthy Shastry. The album consists of four tracks.

No.	Title	Lyrics	Singer(s)	Length
1.	"Belli Moda Hatthuttha"		Anant Nag, Shankar Nag, D. Prabhakar Rao
2.	"Heege Nee Naguthiruvaaga"	Rudramurthy Shastry	S. P. Balasubrahmanyam, Vani Jairam
3.	"Baralide Hosa Ruthu"		S. P. Balasubrahmanyam
4.	"Arasutha Sukhavanu"		Vani Jairam

== Awards ==
1979–80 Karnataka State Film Awards

- Second Best Film — Anant Nag, Shankar Nag
- Best Actor – Anant Nag
- Best Supporting Actor – Lokanath
- Best Screenplay – Mariyam Jetpurawala, Shankar Nag
- Best Cinematographer – B. C. Gowrishankar
- Best Editor – P. Bhaktavatsalam
- Best Sound Recording – S. P. Ramanathan

28th Filmfare Awards South

- Best Director — Shankar Nag
