= Nodi Swamy Navirodu Hige =

Nodi Swamy Navirodu Heege
- Film poster
- Directed by: Shankar Nag
- Written by: Manohar Katadare
- Screenplay by: Shankar Nag
- Produced by: Ramesh Bhat
- Starring: Shankar Nag; Ananth Nag; Ramesh Bhat; Arundhati Nag; Lakshmi; Master Manjunath
- Cinematography: Kulashekhar
- Edited by: P. Bhaktavatsalam
- Music by: G. K. Venkatesh
- Production company: Gayathri Chithralaya
- Release date: 1983
- Running time: 142 minutes
- Country: India
- Language: Kannada

Nodi Swamy Navirodu Heege (Kannada: ನೋಡಿ ಸ್ವಾಮಿ ನಾವಿರೋದು ಹೀಗೆ ; English : Look Sir, this is the way we are) is a 1983 Indian Kannada language film directed by and starring Shankar Nag. It also stars Master Manjunath ("Chottey"), Arundhati Nag, and Ramesh Bhat in prominent roles.

The music was composed by noted composer G. K. Venkatesh. The title song became a commercial success and gained widespread popularity across audiences of all ages. Bhimsen Joshi performed a song in the film at the request of G. K. Venkatesh.

== Plot ==
Mysore Matha (Shankar Nag) is a carefree and cheerful individual who lives life to the fullest despite being unemployed. He resides with a young boy named Chottey (Master Manjunath ), who acts as his sidekick and constant companion. Mysore shares a deep bond with Chottey and cares for him like family. Known for his helpful nature, Mysore is well-loved by his neighbors.

Kallesh Nuggehalli (Ramesh Bhat), Mysore's best friend, falls in love with Jaya Jahagirdar (Arundhati Nag) and persuades Mysore to help him arrange a meeting with her. Jaya reciprocates Kallesh's feelings, and the two fall in love. However, Jaya's father (Loknath), a retired bank manager, is skeptical of Kallesh and rejects the alliance. Despite her father's objections, Jaya marries Kallesh.

Initially, Kallesh and Jaya enjoy a happy married life, but domestic challenges soon lead to conflicts between them. Tensions escalate when Kallesh's mother (Tara Mallya), an orthodox and religious woman, comes to stay with them. Her strict routines and critical attitude toward Jaya worsen the situation. Jaya tries to share her struggles with Kallesh, but he dismisses her concerns, insisting that his mother is his top priority. Frustrated and hurt, Jaya leaves and moves into a women's hostel.

Unaware of these developments, Mysore eventually learns about the rift and confronts Kallesh. He shares a personal story from his past, revealing how his brother and sister-in-law faced similar conflicts. The situation ended tragically with his sister-in-law's death shortly after giving birth to Chottey. Mysore's account helps Kallesh understand the importance of valuing and supporting one’s spouse.

Kallesh realizes his mistakes and reconciles with Jaya. The couple resolve to address their differences and work on their relationship. They promise Mysore that they will always remember their love for each other and strive to resolve future conflicts without breaking apart.

== Cast ==
- Shankar Nag as Mysore Matha
- Ramesh Bhat as Kallesh Nuggehalli
- Arundhati Nag as Jaya Jahagirdar
- Ananth Nag as Mysore Matha's brother (Special appearance)
- Lakshmi as Aparna (Special appearance)
- Master Manjunath as Chottey
- Loknath as Jaya's father
- Udaya Kumar as Aparna's father
- Kamani Dharan as Jaya's mother
- Tara Mallya as Kallesh's mother
- Upasane Seetharam as Neighbor

== Soundtrack ==
The music for the film was composed by G. K. Venkatesh, with lyrics written by Chi. Udayashankar and Sri Purandaradasaru.

Sl No	Song	Artist
1.	"Nodi Swamy Naavirodu Heege"	S. P. Balasubrahmanyam
2.	"Bhagyada Lakshmi"	Bhimsen Joshi
3.	" Namage Maduve Beda Swamy"	S. P. Balasubrahmanyam
