= Ramesh Bhat =

Indian (Kannada-cinema) film actor (born 1946)

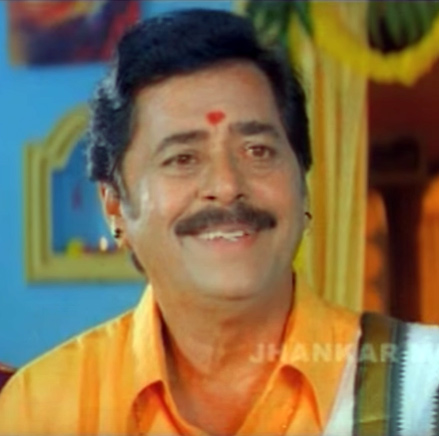
- Ramesh Bhat in 2011 film Sri Naga Shakthi
- Born: 7 January 1946 (age 80); Kundapur, Karnataka, India
- Occupations: Actor, film director, producer

Ramesh Bhat is an Indian actor who has worked predominantly in Kannada films and television serials.

== Early life ==
Ramesh Bhat was born in Kundapur, Karnataka. He completed his primary education at Manki and portrayed national leaders like Jawaharlal Nehru in school day functions. He moved to Bangalore when his father, Rathnakar Rao, migrated there. He later studied at Model High School in Chamarajapet, Bangalore and went on to complete his diploma in mechanical engineering from SJ Polytechnic in Bangalore. He briefly worked at Kirloskar as a fitter before joining his father's business. He also ran his own business in Basavanagudi.

== Career ==
In the 1960s and 1970s, young Ramesh worked with theatre groups like Spandana, Nataranga, and Benaka. Working in theatre brought him closer to Shankar Nag, resulting in several plays, films and TV series. He was the assistant director for the television series Malgudi Days. He has also directed a movie named Parameshi Prema Prasanga, which was nominated for the National Awards in 1983.

== Awards ==
- 2010: Karnataka Rajyotsava award
- 2015: Karnataka State Film Award for Best Supporting Actor – Mana Manthana
- 2023: Rotary Annual Vandana Award in recognition of his achievements in the fields of entertainment and cinema.

== Notable filmography ==
- All films are in Kannada, unless otherwise noted.

Year	Title	Role	Notes
1973	Abachurina Post Office		
1980	Minchina Ota	Inspector Nayak	
1981	Geetha	Satish	
1983	Coolie		
1983	Nodi Swamy Navirodu Hige	Kallesh Nuggehalli	
1983	Hosa Theerpu	Mohan	
1984	Makkaliralavva Mane Thumba		
1985	Parameshi Prema Prasanga	Parameshi	
1985	Accident	Inspector Rao	
1986	Malgudi Days		Hindi / English; various roles played by Bhat in Shankar Nag's TV series
1986	Na Ninna Preetisuve	Mallesh Mavinakere	
1987	Digvijaya	Soorappa Nayak	
1987	Ondu Muttina Kathe	Kutta	
1987	Anthima Ghatta	Bhaskar	
1987	Lorry Driver	Vasu	
1987	Poornachandra	Raghu	
1988	Crazy Colonel	Colonel	Television series
1989	Narasimha	Visveswaraya	
1989	Hosa Kavya	Chandru	
1989	Bala Hombale	Hari	
1989	Idu Saadhya	Constable Ranga	Cameo
1990	Matsara	Jayanna	
1990	Nigooda Rahasya		
1990	Neene Nanna Jeeva		
1990	Ramarajyadalli Rakshasaru		
1990	Ganeshana Maduve	Shastri	
1990	Ashwamedha	Gunda	
1990	Avesha	Prajwal Kumar	
1991	Gauri Ganesha	Madhusudan	
1992	Ganesha Subramanya	Subramanya	
1992	Bombat Hendthi	Ramesh	
1992	Mannina Doni	Mallikarjuna	
1992	Saptapadi	Sharma	
1993	Dharma Peeta	Vishwa	
1993	Bhagavan Sri Saibaba	Bhagoji	
1994	September 8		Tulu film
1995	Nishkarsha	Lift Gundanna	
1995	Mutthinantha Hendathi		
1995	Mr. Vasu	Ramesh	
1995	Beladingala Baale	James	
1999	Suryavamsha	Padma's father	
2000	Nan Hendthi Chennagidale	Raghupathi Iyengar	
2000	Yajamana	Ramesh	
2002	Balagalittu Olage Baa		
2003	Preetisle Beku	Ganesha's father	
2003	Mooru Manasu Nooru Kanasu	Chakrapani	
2005	Yashwanth		
2005	Jogi	Madesha's father	
2005	Masala		
2005	Magic Ajji	Queen's grandson-in-law	
2005	Giri	Amjad Khan	
2006	Hettavara Kanasu		
2006	Shree		
2007	No 73, Shanthi Nivasa	Kashinath	
2007	Jambada Hudugi		
2007	Ganesha		
2008	Mussanjemaatu	Tanu's father	
2009	Nannedeya Haadu	Shankara Shastry	
2010	Prithvi	Priya's father	Guest Appearance
2010	Aptharakshaka		
2010	Jayahe		
2010	Gandedhe		
2011	Uyyale		
2011	Sanju Weds Geetha	Doctor	
2012	Chingari	Geeta's father	
2012	Alemari	Sridhar Sastry	
2012	Dashamukha	Judge	
2012	Romeo	Ramesh	
2012	Sri Kshetra Adichunchanagiri		
2012	Godfather	Servant	
2013	Shathru		
2014	Adyaksha	Chandru's father	
2015	Bullet Basya		
2015	Ganesha Matte Banda	Ganesha's father	
2015	Mana Manthana		Karnataka State Film Award for Best Supporting Actor
2016	Kalpana 2		
2016	Naani		
2016	...Re		
2017	Veera Ranachandi		
2017	Nemoda Boolya		Tulu film
2018	Brahmi		
2018	Krishna Tulasi		
2018	Sarkari Hi. Pra. Shaale, Kasaragodu, Koduge: Ramanna Rai	Anantha Padmanabha M.	
2019	Kavacha	Jayarama's uncle	
2023	Gadhayuddha	Scientist	
2023	Sreemanta		
2026	Sankeerthana		
2026	Common Man		

== Short Movies ==
Year	Title	Role	Language	Notes
2016	Meghadootha	Chandrashekar	Kannada	
2020	Teerada Mouna	Ramesh	Kannada	
