= Janma Janmada Anubandha =

1980 Indian film directed by Shankar Nag

- Directed by: Shankar Nag
- Written by: Shankar Nag
- Produced by: K. N. Saroja bai A. N. Murthy; Shankar Nag; Ananth Nag
- Starring: Anant Nag; Jayanthi; Shankar Nag; Jayamala; Manjula
- Cinematography: B. C. Gowrishankar
- Edited by: P. Bhaktavatsalam
- Music by: Ilaiyaraaja
- Production company: Pushpa Productions
- Release date: 1980
- Running time: 108 minutes
- Country: India
- Language: Kannada

Janma Janmada Anubandha is a 1980 Indian Kannada-language thriller drama film directed, co-produced and scripted by Shankar Nag. The film has an ensemble cast including Anant Nag, Shankar Nag, Jayanthi, Jayamala and Manjula.

== Plot ==
The film starts out with a young Avinash playing at home with his mentally challenged uncle outside his home a dead body is being taken in a procession to be buried. The young Avinash follows the procession all the way to the cemetery and once the body is buried the young Avinash goes over and starts exhuming the body.

Meanwhile Avinash's mother and uncle come searching for the little boy and find him the cemetery and take him home. That night the young boy has visions of his past and ends up trying to physically choke his mother in his frenzy. The mother and the uncle help console the boy and life continues.

Avinash grows up to be Anant Nag and works as a civil engineer, one day at his work site, a few goons try to physically assault one of the female workers in the construction site, at that time another labourer Shive beats up the goons. Avinash thanks Shivu for the help and Shivu requests the engineer to send him back home to the quarry that he used to work in. Avinash agrees and sends him back home.

Avinash in the meanwhile is friends with his neighbour Malathi and they intend getting married, Avinash suddenly gets his dreams of his reincarnation back, he discusses this with Malathi, who tells him to forget his recurring dreams and get on with life. One night unable to hear the taunts of Malathi's parents, Avinash who has been researching about the images that he has seen in his dreams, runs away from his mother and Malathi to the place he has researched upon.

Once he reaches the place he immediately feels that he knows the village in and out and he goes over to the house of Jayanthi, his wife of his past birth. He recognises her and even though she recognises him doesnt welcome him. Avinash then goes around town identifying different people with whom he had interacted with. He turns out to be Girish Achari a sculptor who was killed by the Landlord Sundar Krishna Urs for going to a police station and registering a complaint against the Landlord. Jayanthi and Avinash eventually meet up and Avinash tells her about his reincarnation, Jayanthi then tells him what all transpired after his death and about their son Shivu who nows works in the quarry.

The villagers spread rumours about Jayanthi and Avinash, and it reaches the ears of Shivu, who confronts both of them. Then Shivu gets to know the story of his parents and his fathers eventual death. They also exhume to skeletal remains of Girish Achari. Shivu and Avinash team up and go to the landlords house to extract vengeance, the landlord tries to deliver a killer blow to Avinash which is intercepted by Jayanthi, who ends up getting stabbed, she then takes the same knife and stabs the Landlord to death.

The film ends with Avinash after having reconciled with Jayanthi and Shivu goes back to Malathi in the town.

== Cast ==
- Anant Nag as Avinash / Girish Achari
- Shankar Nag as Shiva Achari
- Jayanthi as Girish Achari's wife
- Jayamala as Avinash's fiancée Malathi
- Manjula as Shiva's love interest Putti
- Master Rohith as young Avinash
- K. S. Ashwath as Avinash's uncle Panduranga
- Tiger Prabhakar as Shiva's friend Gundanna
- Sundar Krishna Urs as Landlord
- Shakti Prasad as Landlord's servant Javara
- Advani Lakshmi Devi as Avinash's mother

== Soundtrack ==
The music of the film was composed by Ilaiyaraaja, with lyrics by Chi. Udaya Shankar. The songs "Thangaliyaali Naanu" is set in Gowrimanohari raaga, "Yaava Shilpi" is in Shuddha Dhanyasi, and "Akashadinda Jaari" is in Mohana.

Track listing
No.	Title	Singer(s)	Length
1.	"Thangaliyalli Naanu"	S. Janaki
2.	"Yaava Shilpi Kanda Kanasu"	S. P. Balasubrahmanyam, S. Janaki
3.	"Gandagi Naanu"	S. P. Balasubrahmanyam, S. P. Sailaja
4.	"Minuguva Thareya"	Sulochana
5.	"Aakashadinda Jaari"	S. P. Balasubrahmanyam, S. Janaki
