= Shankar Nag =

Indian actor, screenwriter, director, and producer (1954-1990)

- Born: Shankar Nagarakatte; 9 November 1954; Honnavara, North Canara (Now Uttara Kannada district), Mysore State (Now Karnataka), India
- Died: 30 September 1990 (aged 35); Anagodu Village, Davanagere, Karnataka, India
- Occupations: Actor; director; screenwriter
- Years active: 1977–1990
- Works: Full list
- Spouse: Arundathi Rao (m. 1980)
- Children: 1
- Relatives: Gayatri (sister-in-law); Padmavati Rao (sister-in-law)
- Family: Anant Nag (brother)

Shankar Nagarakatte (9 November 1954 – 30 September 1990), popularly known as Shankar Nag was an Indian actor, screenwriter, director, and producer known for his work in Kannada-language films and television. A popular cultural icon of Karnataka, Nag is often referred to as Karate King and Auto Raja. He directed the teleserial Malgudi Days, based on novelist R. K. Narayan's short stories and acted in some episodes as well. He won two National Film Awards, four Karnataka State Film Awards and two Filmfare Award South.

Nag received the inaugural IFFI Best Actor Award (Male): Silver Peacock Award" at the 7th International Film Festival of India for his work in the film Ondanondu Kaladalli. He co-wrote 22 June 1897, a National award-winning Marathi film. He is the younger brother of actor Anant Nag. Vincent Canby, the chief film critic of The New York Times had opined that Shankar's performance in Ondanondu Kaladalli had the force and humor of the younger Toshiro Mifune.

== Early career ==
Shankar Nagarkatte was born on 9 November 1954 in Honnavar, then a part of North Canara (now Uttara Kannada district), in Bombay State (now in Karnataka). His parents were Anandi and Sadanand Nagarkatte. Born into a Konkani speaking Brahmin family, his family settled in Shirali, a village near Bhatkal in Uttara Kannada district of Karnataka State. He had an elder sister named Shyamala, and an elder brother, actor Anant Nag. After completing formal education, Nag moved to Bombay. There, he was attracted to Marathi theatre and immersed himself in theatrical activities. Incidentally, he met his future wife, Arundhathi during a drama rehearsal. Nag then shifted base to Bangalore where his elder brother Anant Nag had already established himself as a popular actor.

In 1978 Nag made his debut with Girish Karnad's epic film Ondanondu Kaladalli, where he played a mercenary who earns a position in a rival army to get even with his brother, whom he considers his enemy.

== Acting and directing ==
Following the modest success of Ondanondu Kaladalli and the critical accolades he garnered, Nag started appearing in mainstream films. Seetharamu, Auto Raja and Preethi Madu Thamashe Nodu were amongst his early movies. He eventually became known for his action films, and while he had never undergone any martial arts training, he earned the nickname "Karate King". Some of his popular commercial movies as an actor include Nyaya Ellide, Nyaya Gedditu, Gedda Maga, Sangliyana, S. P. Sangliyana Part 2 and C.B.I. Shankar. He formed a popular pair with top actress Bhavya who acted with him in 11 films.

Nag made his directorial debut with Minchina Ota, one of the earliest heist movies of Kannada cinema. This won him seven state awards, including that for best film. Janma Janmada Anubandha and Geetha followed. There was no looking back after that. His directorial ventures include Lalach (Hindi remake of Minchina Ota), Hosa Theerpu (remake of Dushman), Nodi Swamy Navirodu Hige, Ondu Muttina Kathe (loosely based on John Steinbeck's novel The Pearl) and the critically acclaimed Accident, which won many state and national awards.

== Television and theatre ==
In 1987, Shankar Nag directed the Doordarshan series Malgudi Days, which was based on a collection of short stories by R.K. Narayan. The series featured Vishnuvardhan and Anant Nag, with music by was composed by L. Vaidyanathan. The series was shot in Agumbe, Shimoga district, Karnataka. Nag went to direct another teleserial, Swami, in the same year. Malgudi Days has been rated as one of the finest serials ever to be made in the history of Indian television.

He anchored the Parichaya program on DD1-Kannada, in its starting days. Nag retained an interest in theatre. His brother Anant Nag and he founded Sanket, an amateur theatre group, which still produces plays. His first directorial effort in Kannada theatre was Anju Mallige by Girish Karnad. He continued with productions like Barrister, Sandhya Chhaya. He was later joined by T. N. Narasimhan, who wrote and co-directed Nodi Swamy Navirodu Hige which had, apart from himself, his wife Arundhati Nag and Ramesh Bhat in the cast.

== Social work ==
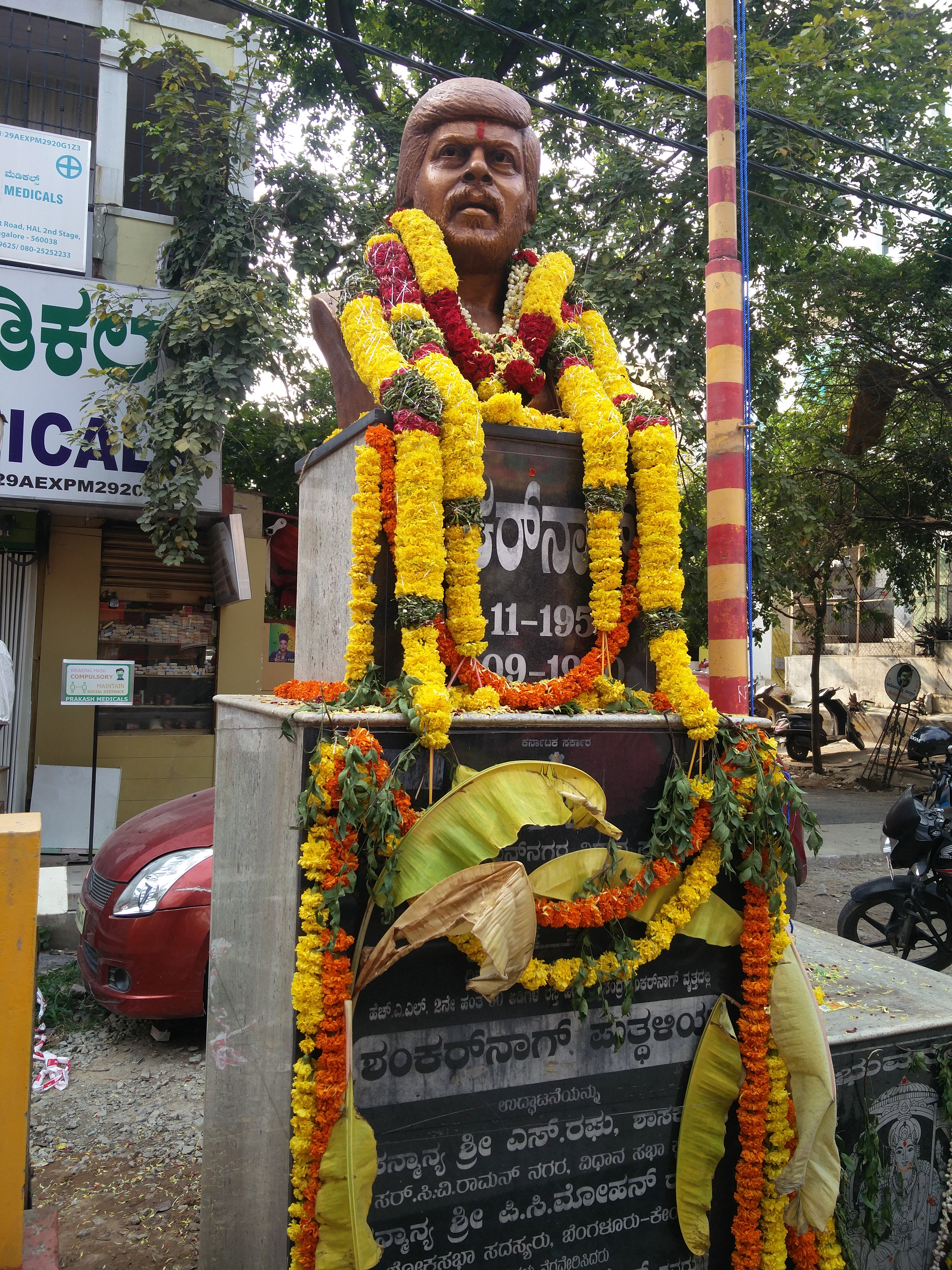
Shankar Nag's bronze statue at Indiranagar, Bengaluru

Shankar Nag, was multi-faceted person, involved in various aspects of Karnataka's Infrastructure. He is credited with pioneering efforts in initiating

- Rope Way/Cable Car to heighten the tourist experience at Nandi Hills
- Metro Train for Bengaluru
- Low Cost Houses that could be built in 8 days
- Club for Amusement
- Theater for performing Arts, including Drama

== Death ==
Nag died in a car collision at Anagodu village on the outskirts of Davanagere town on 30 September 1990 during the pre-production work for his film Jokumaraswamy. The last film he did as an actor, Sundarakanda, was released a few days after his death for which Nag's voice was dubbed by Murali. Anant Nag completed the dubbing for Nigooda Rahasya. Nag's last release was Bhargava's Prana Snehitha, which had been completed fully but was delayed.

== Legacy ==
Even after three decades of his passing, Shankar Nag remains in Karnataka’s cultural memory. His image adorns autorickshaws across Karnataka, a tribute to his iconic role in Auto Raja (1980), which elevated the dignity of the working-class profession. For many auto drivers, Shankar Nag symbolizes pride, resilience, and hope.

Modern Kannada audiences, especially those who admire content-driven cinema, see Shankar Nag as a benchmark for creativity and courage. His films like Minchina Ota (1980) and Accident (1985) are still discussed in film schools for their social relevance and technical finesse. Directors of today such as Rakshit Shetty and Pawan Kumar often cite Shankar Nag as an inspiration for urban-centric narratives and experimental storytelling. His Malgudi Days adaptation remains a timeless classic, shaping generations of television viewers and influencing OTT creators today.

Shankar Nag was not just a filmmaker; he was an urban planner and social reformer. In 1989, he invested his own money and conceptualized the Bengaluru Metro blueprint, envisioning a modern public transport system decades before its actual implementation. His dream included ropeways, amusement parks, and clubs to make Bengaluru a global city. Though his life was tragically cut short, his ideas reflect a rare blend of artistic genius and civic responsibility, inspiring activists and urban planners even today.

The Swagath Shankarnag Chitramandira is a cinema hall in Benglauru named after Shankur Nag. The film Shankar Nag Kelkond Bandaga depicts a visior of modern Bengaluru. Stickers, murals, and social media fan pages about him remain present among Genz cinephiles.

== Awards ==
=== National Film Awards ===
- National Film Award for Best Children's Film (1986-87) for Swamy
- National Film Award for Best Film on Other Social Issues (1984–85) for Accident

=== Karnataka State Film Awards ===
- Best Second Film (1979–80) along with Anant Nag for Minchina Ota
- Best Screenplay (1979–80) along with Mariyam Jetpurwala for Minchina Ota
- Best First Film (1984–85) for Accident
- Best Director (1984–85) for Accident

=== Filmfare Awards South ===
- Best Director (1980) for Minchina Ota
- Best Director (1984) for Accident

=== IFFI Award for Best Actor ===
- Silver Peacock Award for Best Actor (1979) for Ondanondu Kaladalli
