= Talavady =

Town in Tamil Nadu, India

Thalavadi is a hilly town with a predominantly Kannada-speaking population, located near the Dhimbham Hills in the Erode district of Tamil Nadu, India. Situated on the Eastern Ghats, it borders Karnataka. Talavady block is primarily characterized by hilly terrain and undulating plains. Situated 823 metres above sealevel, it has a salubrious weather most of the year. It's located at south of Suvarnavathi Reservoir on a local road off NH 209, nearly 20 kilometres (12.4 mi) north of Thalamalai. It is the least populous taluk of Erode District and is close to the BRT Wildlife sanctuary where the Western Ghats and Eastern Ghats converge.

Doddagajanur in Talavady taluk is the birthplace of Kannada actor Rajkumar.

Previously part of Sathyamangalam taluk, it was made a separate taluk in 2016. Talavady is the main commercial centre for the newly formed taluk. Five roads connect it to the NH209, the first one via Bisalvadi to Venkataiahnachatra, second one via Yelekatte to Chikkahole, third one via Ramapuram, fourth one via Gumtapuram and the fifth one via Doddapuram to Dhimbam. Only the last road runs entirely in Tamil Nadu. All other roads exit through Karnataka. Talavady–Dhimbam road runs through core area of Sathyamangalam Wildlife Sanctuary, and the entry is restricted, except for state run transport buses and private vehicles with permission.
