= Coimbatore–Chamrajnagar line =

Railway line in India

Overview
- Status: Proposed
- Owner: Indian Railways
- Locale: Tamilnadu; Karnataka
- Termini: Coimbatore; Chamrajnagar

Service
- Operator(s): Southern Railway zone, South Western Railway Zone

Technical
- Track length: 165 km (103 mi)
- Number of tracks: 1
- Track gauge: 5 ft 6 in (1,676 mm) broad gauge
- Operating speed: up to 80 km/h (50 mph)

The Coimbatore–Chamrajnagar line is a proposed railway line from Coimbatore in Tamil Nadu to Chamrajnagar in Karnataka. It is a part of the Southern Railway zone of the Indian Railways. Upon construction, this line would connect Western Tamil Nadu with Karnataka. The line would give direct rail connectivity between Coimbatore and Mysore and would reduce the travel distance from Coimbatore to Mysore and Bangalore. It would also connect Tamil Nadu with the Southern districts of Karnataka.

== History ==
While under British Rule, several surveys were taken in 1922, 1936 and 1942. These survey stones were laid for the proposed railway line. After Independence, the scheme did not take off and was rejected later amid concerns over the destruction of forests and wildlife. During Pawan Kumar Bansal's tenure, he announced in the railway budget that the Ministry of Railways will revive an old proposal to lay a broad-gauge railway line through the dense forests of Chamarajnagar-Sathyamangalam-Mettupalayam. In his speech, Bansal said the proposal was neglected for a long time because of the lack of environmental clearance. To justify his decision to revive the project, Bansal said that the Karnataka government had expressed its willingness to meet 50% of the construction cost along with providing the required land free of cost.

Ironically, the minister made this announcement just after he expressed anxiety over the growing elephant deaths due to speeding trains. During the first half of his speech, the minister said that the railways would work along with the Ministry of Environment, Forest and Climate Change to find strategies to avert collisions involving trains and elephants.

The project was later shelved following strong public protest as they believed it would wiped out the elephant population in Sathyamangalam. Even though the minister claimed to have Karnataka's support, the Tamil Nadu government remained silent about the fact that the proposed route would pass through the Sathyamangalam and Mettupalayam forests, which constitute the elephant corridor linking the Western and the Eastern Ghats. Five years ago, the chief engineer-construction (west) of the South Western Railways approached the Central Empowered Committee of the Supreme Court of India seeking permission for the Tamil Nadu Forest Department to conduct a feasibility survey for the railway line. The Supreme Court did not grant permission.

As per the Indian Railways' statement, the proposed railway line would pass through 58 km of the dense forest in the Tamil Nadu, with an environmental impact that would begin with the felling of trees for survey work. A document prepared by the railways says the railway line will come under the Nilgiri's elephant reserve which is a part of the Nilgiri Biosphere Reserve and the Sathyamangalam Tiger Reserve.

The proposed railway line will pass through erstwhile Veerappan territories like Talavadi, Gattawadi and Bannari. Around a dozen conservation groups in Karnataka and Tamil Nadu fear that the project could cause enormous destruction to the sandalwood forests and Asiatic elephants of that region. Along with other conservation groups in Karnataka, the Tamil Nadu Green Movement is planning to approach the Supreme Court, as the proposed line would divide the only contiguous elephant habitat spread across 15,000 km^{2} in Karnataka and Tamil Nadu. However, Railway sources claim the new line would directly connect north-western Tamil Nadu with regions of Karnataka including Bengaluru, Mysore, Mandya, Mangaluru and Hassan, boosting transportation in Karnataka, Tamil Nadu and Kerala. According to the Railways, they have no alternative to the dense forests of Sathyamangalam.

== Route ==
The revived proposal was initially prepared in 1915 to link Palani with Chamrajanagar. It was planned via Kangeyam, Erode, Gobichettipalayam and Sathyamangalam. The British had conducted many surveys in 1922, 1936 and 1942 and survey stones were also laid for the proposed railway line. Later, the proposal was changed.

The proposed railway line will pass through reserve forest areas like Satyamangalam forest and the Nilgiri Mountains. Places in between Chamrajnagar and Coimbatore like Talavadi, Gattawadi, Bannari, Satyamangalam, Gobichettipalayam, Erode, Mettupalayam will be connected through this line. On completion, the railway line would have 277 bridges, 138 curves and 61 tunnels. There have been suggestions to use tunnel boring machines to drill tunnels which will be less pollutive. There have also been suggestions on laying the railway line without the destruction of forest area. One of the suggested routes is Sathyamangalam, Pulliyampatti, Avinashi, Tirupur (Vanjipalayam) or Tirupur. From Vanjipalayam, the line can be connected to Tirupur and then the Coimbatore mainline. Another suggestion is through Sathyamangalam, Annur, Mettupalayam. From there, Mettupalayam - Coimbatore main line can be used to connect with Coimbatore.

== Ecological concerns ==
Conservation biologists and ecologists have raised concerns about the ecological impact of the proposed railway lines. Over 58 km of the railway line passing through the Sathyamangalam Wildlife Sanctuary and Nilgiri Biosphere Reserve would mean wildlife mortality due to railway collisions almost daily.

== Economic factors ==
The new line would directly connect Northwestern Tamil Nadu cities such as Coimbatore, Tirupur, Erode, Nilgiris, Karur with regions of Karnataka including Bengaluru, Mysuru, Mandya, Mangaluru and Hassan, besides boosting transportation in Karnataka, Tamil Nadu and Kerala. The proposed line would reduces the travel time to Mysuru and Bengaluru by more than half as compared to the current route.
