= Cheluveye Ninne Nodalu =

- Directed by: D. P. Raghuram
- Written by: D. P. Raghuram
- Produced by: N. M. Suresh
- Starring: Shiva Rajkumar; Sonal Chauhan; Hariprriya
- Cinematography: Kabir Lal
- Edited by: S. Manohar
- Music by: V. Harikrishna
- Production company: Sri Thulaja Bhavani Creations
- Release date: 6 August 2010
- Running time: 140 minutes
- Country: India
- Language: Kannada

Cheluveye Ninne Nodalu is a 2010 Indian Kannada-language film written and directed by D. P. Raghuram. It stars Shiva Rajkumar and Sonal Chauhan. The film was notable for the song "Janumada Jodi", which was shot at the seven wonders of the world.

== Synopsis ==
Vishwa (Shiva Rajkumar) is a poor, carefree and generous person who works as a travel guide. Prakruthi (Sonal Chauhan) is a rich and introverted girl who does not believe in love and marriage because of the traumatic experiences she went through in her childhood. She is attracted to Vishwa's helping nature and falls for him. How she wins his love forms the plot of the movie.

== Cast ==
- Shiva Rajkumar as Vishwanath
- Sonal Chauhan as Prakruthi
- Hariprriya as Sahana
- Vinaya Prasad as Sumithra
- Avinash as Patil
- Chandrashekhar as Desai, Prakruthi's father
- Chitra Shenoy as Sharada, Prakruthi's mother
- H. G. Dattatreya as Gopala Gowda
- Mandeep Roy
- Shanthamma as Shanthamma
- Venkatesh Prasad as Nikhil
- Kavya as Nischitha
- Tharun Sudhir as Manoj
- Sangeetha as Sumathi
- Rekha Kumar as Pavani
- Nagashekar
- Ramesh Aravind as narrator
- Prem in cameo appearance

== Production ==
Cheluveye Ninne Nodalu was launched on 11 December 2008 at the Durga Parameswari temple in Bangalore and shooting was completed on 18 March 2010.

== Soundtrack ==
Cheluveye Ninne Nodalu

Soundtrack album by V. Harikrishna
- Released: December 2009
- Recorded: 2009
- Genre: Feature film soundtrack
- Length: 37:23
- Label: Anand Audio

V. Harikrishna chronology
Maleyali Jotheyali (2009)	Cheluveye Ninne Nodalu (2009)

V. Harikrishna scored the film's background score and the soundtrack. The soundtrack album consists of eight tracks. Lyrics for the tracks were written by V. Nagendra Prasad, Nagathihalli Chandrashekhar, S. Narayan and Yogaraj Bhat. A remixed version of the song "Huttidare Kannada" from the film Aakasmika (1993) was used in the film. The album was released on 30 November 2009 and was distributed in by Anand Audio. A Video CD was distributed along with the audio CD of the album that contained a 55-minute video of the film's making.

No.	Title	Lyrics	Singer(s)	Length
1.	"Janumana Kotta"	V. Nagendra Prasad	Shiva Rajkumar	5:24
2.	"Janumada Jodi"	Nagathihalli Chandrashekhar	Sonu Nigam, Sunitha Goparaju	5:42
3.	"Olave Ninne Nodalu"	V. Nagendra Prasad	Vani Harikrishna	3:27
4.	"Huttidare Kannadanadali (Remix Version)"	Hamsalekha	Rajkumar	4:13
5.	"O Priyathamma"	S. Narayan	Sonu Nigam, Sunitha Goparaju	4:58
6.	"Seere Nerige Sari"	Yogaraj Bhat	Udit Narayan, Shamitha Malnad	5:10
7.	"Cheluveye Ninne Nodalu"	V. Nagendra Prasad	S. P. Balasubrahmanyam	3:12
8.	"Hamsa Hamsa"	V. Nagendra Prasad	Kunal Ganjawala	5:17
Total length:				37:23

== Reception ==
=== Critical response ===
A critic from The Times of India scored the film at 3.5 out of 5 stars and says "While Sonal is simply superb, Haripriya is equally good. Dattanna, Prem, Tarun, Venkatesh Prasad have done justice to their roles. Kabir Lal's camera work is pleasing to the eyes. V Harikrishna walks away with all honours for his brilliant musical work. Chinthan, dialogue writer, needs special mention for his good work. A movie for the family audience". B S Srivani from Deccan Herald wrote "Dialogues by Chintan, cinematography by Kabir Lal and music by V Harikrishna all complement the director's vision, providing ample tour-time for the intrepid travellers. "Cheluveye..." is Shivanna's 98th release. The film is a must watch, not only for his fans but also families and armchair tourists".
