= Karnataka State Film Award for Best Male Playback Singer =

Indian film award

- State award for contributions to Kannada cinema
- Awarded for: Best Male Playback Singer of a Song
- Sponsored by: Government of Karnataka
- Rewards: Silver Medal; ₹ 20,000
- First award: 1993-94
- Final award: 2021
- Most recent winner: Aneesh Keshava Rao

Highlights
- First winner: Dr. Rajkumar

Karnataka State Film Award for Best Male Playback Singer is a state film award of the Indian state of Karnataka given during the annual Karnataka State Film Awards. The award honours male singers for their work in Kannada-language films.

== Superlative winners ==
S. P. Balasubrahmanyam	3 awards
Dr. Rajkumar	2 awards
C. Ashwath	2 awards
Ramesh Chandra	2 awards
Rajesh Krishnan	2 awards

== Award winners ==
The following is a complete list of award winners and the name of the films for which they won.

Year	Image	Recipient(s)	Song	Film	Ref
2021	–	Aneesh Keshava Rao	"Rama Dhuthana Pada"	Sri Jagannatha Dasaru	
2020	–	Aniruddha Sastry	Various songs	Acharya Sri Shankara	
2019		Raghu Dixit	"Ohho Love Agoithalla" & "Kaanada Haniyondu"	Love Mocktail	
2018	–	Siddhartha Belmannu	"Irulu Chandirana"	Santakavi Kanakadasara Ramadhanya	
2017	–	Tejaswi Haridas	"Valase Bandavare"	Huliraaya	
2016		Vijay Prakash	"Nammooralli Chaligaladalli"	Beautiful Manasugalu	
2015		Santhosh Venky	"Sundarangiye"	Preethiyalli Sahaja	
2014		Chintan Vikas	"Saahore Saahore"	Gajakesari	
2013	–	Naveen Sajju	"Ede Olagina Tamate"	Lucia	
2012		Vasu Dixit	"Hale Cycle Hatthikondu"	Cyber Yugadol Nava Yuva Madhura Prema Kavyam	
2011	–	Aditya Rao	"Saavira Kiranava Chelli"	Ball Pen	
2010-11	–	Ravindra Soragavi	"Banda Daari"	Puttakkana Highway	
2009-10	–	This Award is taken back			
2008-09		Chetan Sosca	"Yaare Nee Devatheya"	Ambaari	
2007-08		S. P. Balasubrahmanyam	"Nenapu Nenapu"	Savi Savi Nenapu	
2006-07	–	Hemanth Kumar	• "Kallarali Hoovagi" • "Ele Ele Banna"	• Kallarali Hoovagi • Janapada	
2005-06		C. Ashwath	"Aaha Yuvarani"	Shubham	
2004-05		S. P. Balasubrahmanyam	"Hrudayada Thumba"	Srusti	
2003-04		Picchalli Srinivas	"Dodda Gowdara"	Amaasa	
2002-03		Rajesh Krishnan	"Kshamiseya"	Dumbee	
2001-02		Rajesh Krishnan	"Hudugi Superamma"	Ekangi	
2000-01		Ramesh Chandra	"Kadala Theregalu"	Munnudi	
1999-2000		Rajesh Krishnan	"Nagu Bandaroo Alu Bandaroo"	Bannada Hejje	
1998-99		C. Ashwath		Varsharuthu	
1997-98		S. P. Balasubrahmanyam	"Giri Siri"	O Mallige	
1996-97	–	L. N. Shastry	"Kolumande Jangama Devaru"	Janumada Jodi	
1995-96		Ramesh Chandra	"O Mallige Ninnondige"	Anuraga Sangama	
1994-95		Rajkumar	"Arishina Kumkuma"	Thaayi Illada Tavaru	
1993-94		Rajkumar	"Huttidare Kannada"	Aakasmika	

== See also ==
- Cinema of Karnataka
- List of Kannada-language films
