= Talavady taluk =

Administrative area in Tamil Nadu, India

Talavady taluk is a taluk of Erode district of the Indian state of Tamil Nadu. It became a separate taluk within Erode district by the bifurcation of Sathyamangalamon 8 March 2016 along with Modakurichi and Kodumudi taluks.

The new taluk has the control over the same geographic entity of the Talavady revenue block, with Talavady town as its headquarters. The taluk falls under the Gobichettipalayam revenue division.

== Demographics ==
According to the 2011 census, the erstwhile Sathyamangalam taluk had a population of 331,993 with 166,964 males and 165,029 females. There were 988 women for every 1,000 men. The taluk had a literacy rate of 60.43%. Child population in the age group below 6 years were 14,118 males and 13,561 females. As of bifurcation, the present Talavady taluk has a population of ~63,399. Kannadigas are the major ethnicity in this taluk followed by Tamils. Lingayatism is the most followed caste/religion.

== Geography ==
Even though the population is lesser in this area, the rules have been relaxed considering the welfare of tribal communities living in this inhospitable area. Much of the area is covered by Sathyamangalam Tiger Reserve.

== Places ==
Populated places within the taluk include: Hasanur, Talavady, Dhimbam, Germalam, Arepalayam, Talamalai, Gettavadi, Igalore, Jora Hosur, Doddagajanur, Gumatapuram, Marur, Kodipuram, Doddapuram, Dodda Mudukarai, Kalmandipuram, Erahanahalli and Thiganarai.
