= Gajanur, Tamil Nadu =

Village in India

Gajanur
- Village
- Location within Tamil Nadu Location within India
- Coordinates: 11.76607°N 77.00568°E
- Country: India
- State: Tamilnadu
- District: Erode

Languages
  - Official: Tamil
  - Others: Kannada
- Time zone: UTC+5:30 (IST)

Gajanur (pronounced: Gaajanoor) is a village in Talavady taluk, Erode district of Tamilnadu, India. It is also known as Dodda Gajanur. The village is located 4 km (2.5 mi) from the Tamilnadu–Karnataka border, and is 1 km (0.62 mi) south of the town of Talavady.

Gajanur is the birthplace of Kannada film actor Dr. Rajkumar, who was kidnapped by Veerappan from his native house in Gajanur on 30 July 2000. The village abuts the Sathyamangalam Wildlife Sanctuary.
