= Ramesh Chandra (singer) =

Indian playback singer

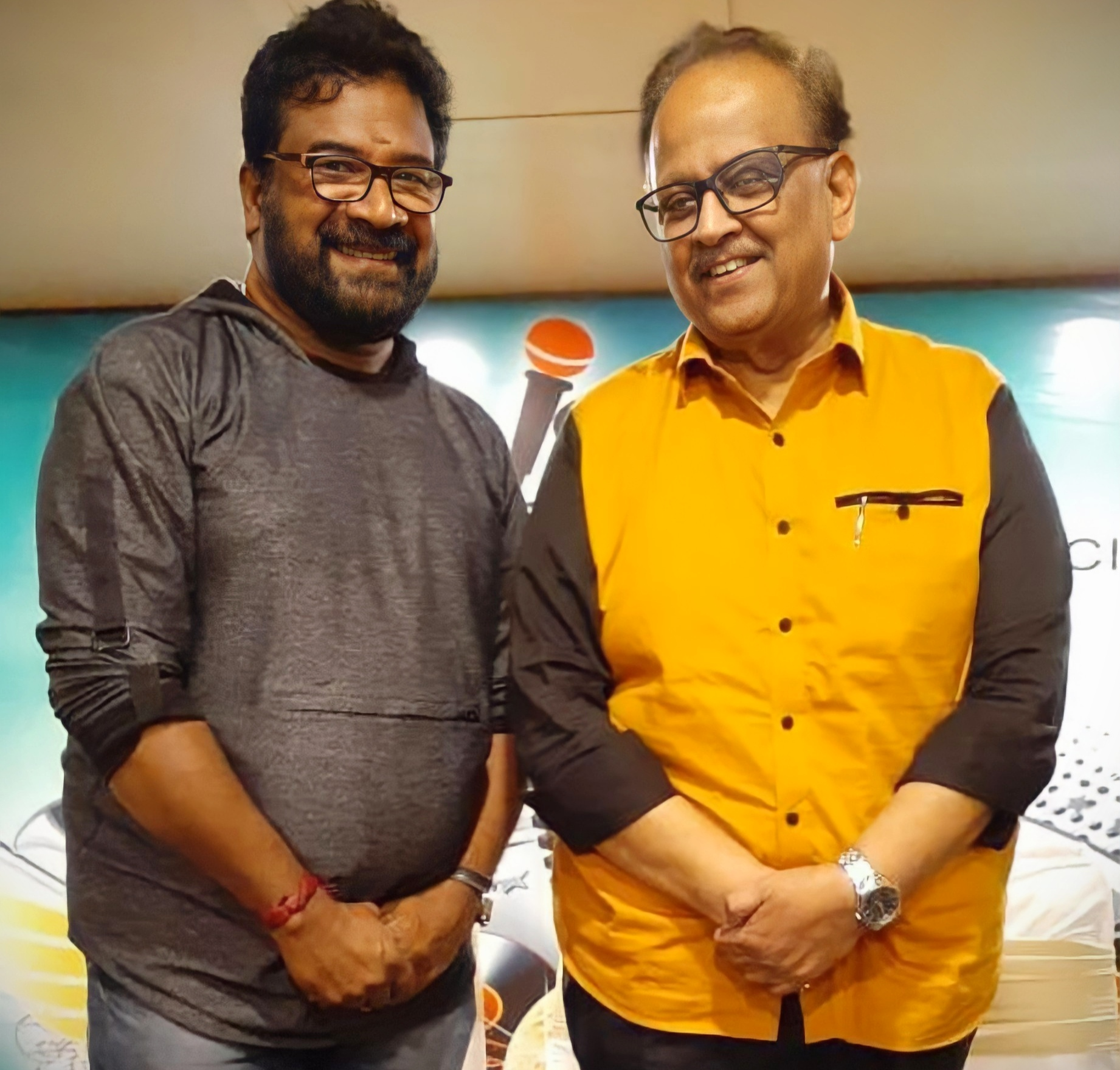
- Rameshchandra (left) with S. P. Balasubrahmanyam

Background information
- Born: K. Ramesh; 1963 (age 62–63); Mangalore, Dakshina Kannada, India
- Occupations: singer
- Years active: 1995 – present
- Musical career
- Genres: Filmi; Folk; Devotional
- Instruments: Vocals
- Labels: Independent Artist
- Awards: Karnataka State Film Award for Best Male Playback Singer

Ramesh Chandra (Kannada: ರಮೇಶ್ ಚಂದ್ರ) is an Indian playback singer who works predominantly in the Kannada film industry. He is the recipient of Karnataka State Film Award for Best Male Playback Singer twice.

== Personal life ==
Ramesh Chandra was born as K. Ramesh in Mangalore and raised in Kasargod. He grew up listening to K. J. Yesudas songs on radio. He went to Kalmady Sadashiva Achar for music classes, the only known Carnatic musician in Kasargod at the time.

Ramesh married to Chandra Jyothi. They have a son.

== Career ==
Ramesh's passion for music brought him to Bangalore and he landed up in Sadhana school of music as a worker under the principalship of G. V. Atri. Ramesh started performing in stage shows and became a track singer for Dr. Rajkumar, S. P. Balasubrahmanyam and K. J. Yesudas. One of his track songs "O mallige Ninnondige" for the composer V. Manohar got retained in the 1995 film Anuraga Sangama and became his first film song. He received his first State award for the same song as well.

Some of his hit songs including "Malagu Malagu Charulathe" (O Mallige), "Karyeshu Dasi" (Mangalyam Tantunanena), "Hoovantha Henne" (Premachari), "Brahma Murari" (Sri Manjunatha).

In his career as a playback singer, Ramesh has worked with V. Manohar, Hamsalekha, Guru Kiran, Mano Murthy and others.

== Awards ==
- Karnataka State Film Award for Best Male Playback Singer
1. 1995–96 – "O Mallige Ninnondige" (Anuraga Sangama)
2. 2000–01 – "Kadala Theregalu" (Munnudi)
- Other awards
1. 2013 – Karnataka Kalashree Award by Karnataka Sangeetha Nrithya Academy

== Notable songs ==
Ramesh Chandra has sung for more than 100 movies in Kannada. Some of his songs include:

- "O Mallige Ninnondige" (Anuraga Sangama)
- "Malagu Malagu Charulathe" (O Mallige)
- "Bul Bulla Hey" (Chandrodaya)
- "Enaitho Antharaladage" (Kaurava)
- "Hoovantha Henne" (Premachari)
- "Baanadi Hadali Thangali Beesali" (Megha Bantu Megha)
- "Hegide Nam Desha" (America America)
- "Pade Pade Nenapade" (Rama Shama Bhama)
