= Kaggalipura =

- village
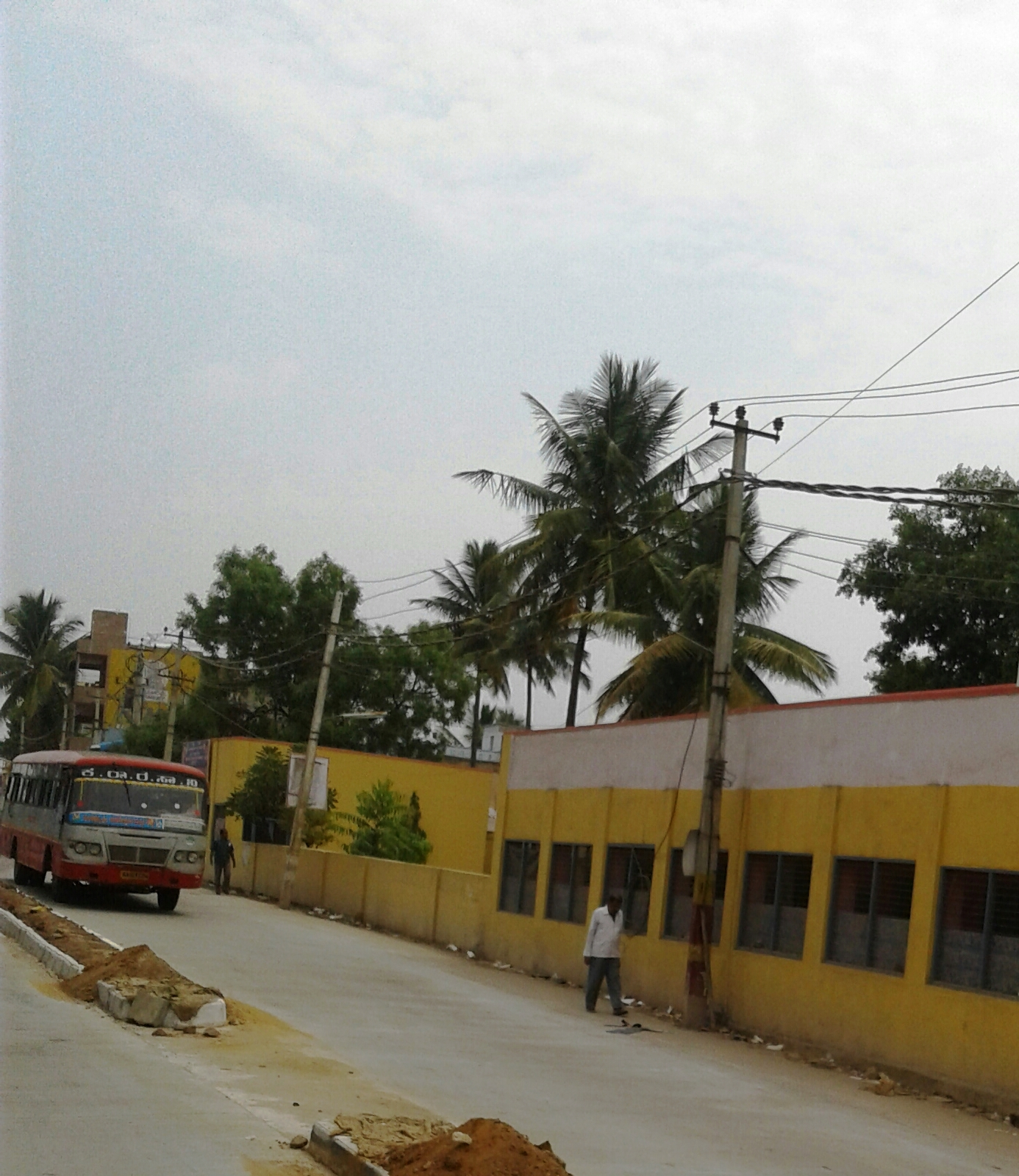
- Interactive map of Kaggalipura
- Country: India
- State: Karnataka
- District: Bangalore south
- Talukas: Kanakapura

Government
  - Body: Kaggalipura Grama Panchayat

Population (2001)
  - Total: 6,907

Languages
  - Official: Kannada
- Time zone: UTC+5:30 (IST)
- PIN: 560082

Kaggalipura is a village along Kanakapura Road on the outskirts of Bangalore, in the southern state of Karnataka, India. Kaggalipura is located on the Bangalore-Coimbatore National Highway 948, around 20 km south of Bangalore. The village is named after the Kaggali tree (Acacia catechu), which grows in abundance locally. The village was established after clearing several Kaggali trees from the area.

Kaggalipura is:

  - 23 km from Majestic Bus Station in Bangalore,
  - 13 km from Uttarahalli,
  - 16 km from Banashankari Temple,
  - 17 km from Global Village Tech Park in Rajarajeshwari Nagar,
  - 18 km from Kengeri via NICE Road,
  - 21 km from Electronic City,
  - 16 km from Meenakshi Mall on Bannerghatta Road and
  - 1 km from Sri Sri Ravishankar Ashram.

Hindus are the largest religious group in the village with their gramadevate (village deity) being Patallamma Devi.

== Demographics ==
As of 2001, according to the census in India, Kaggalipura had a population of 6,907, consisting of 3,562 males and 3,345 females.

== Birds in Kaggalipura ==
Kaggalipura is a notable destination for bird watching in and around Bengaluru. The village lies within Bannerghatta National Park and is home to a wide variety of birds.

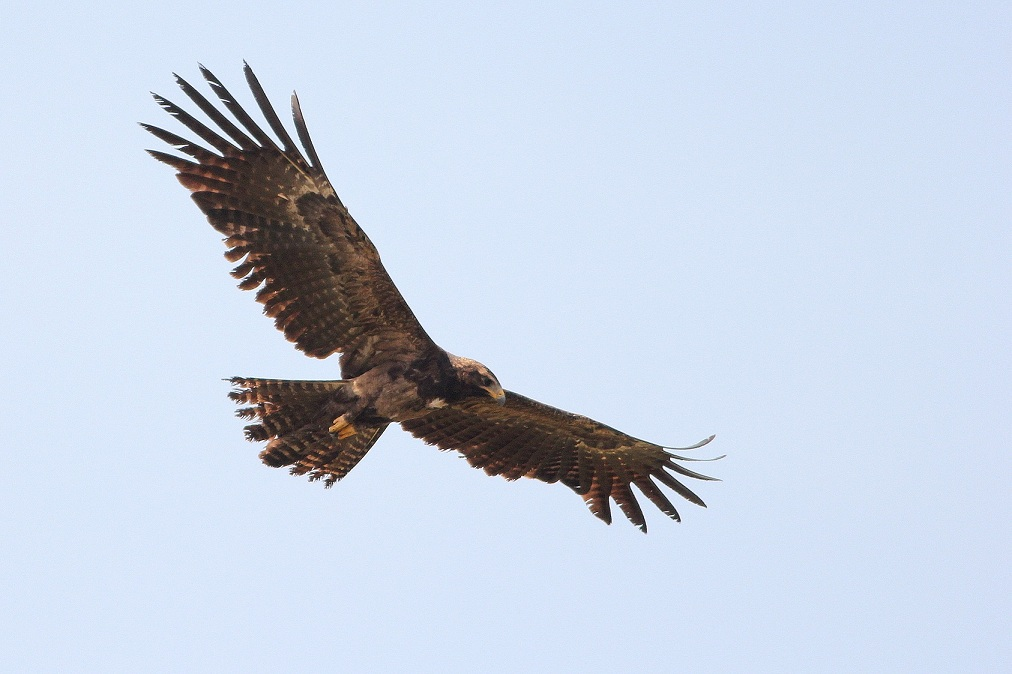
Black eagle in Kaggalipura

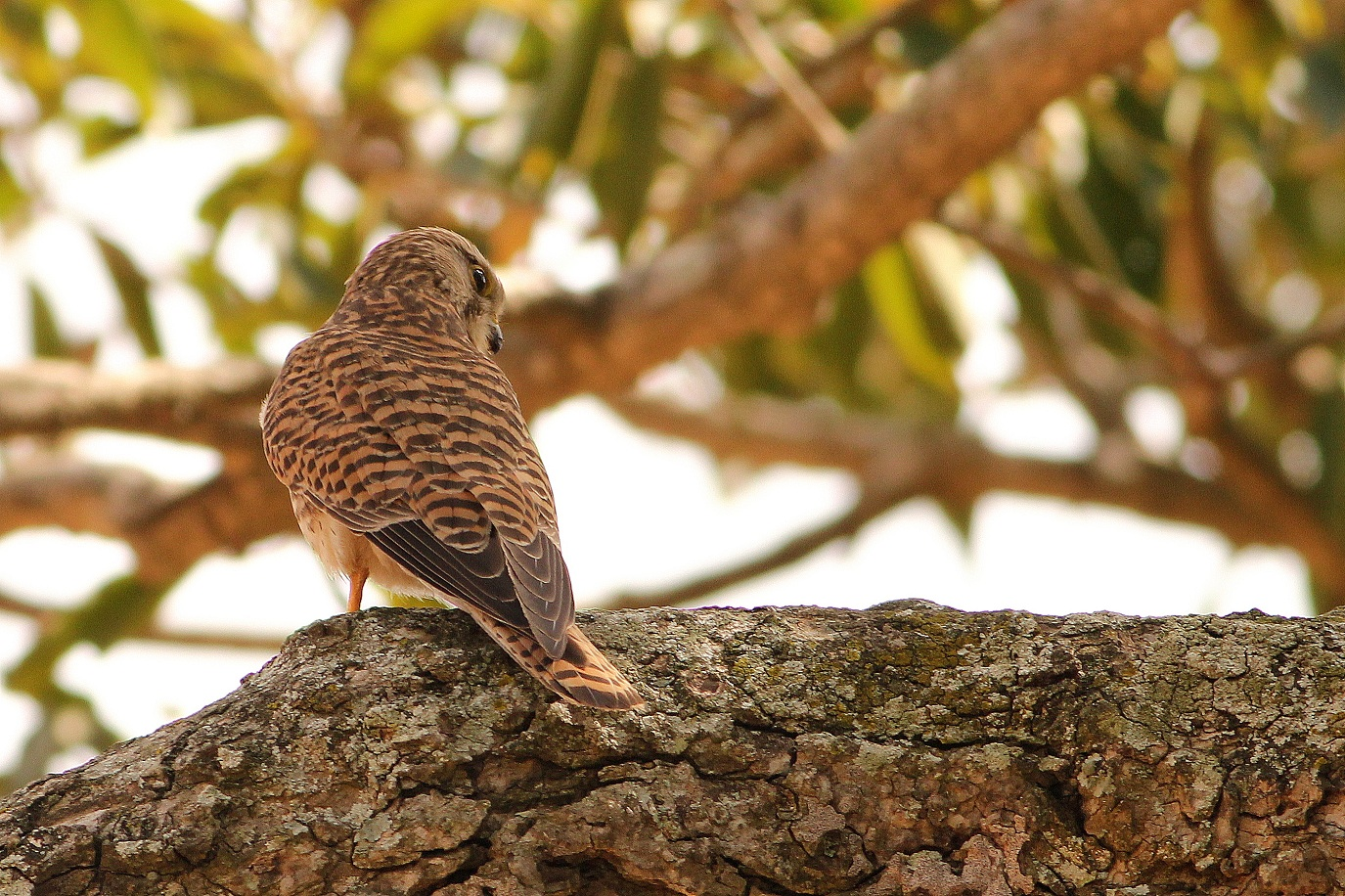
Common kestrel in Kaggalipura
