= Suvarnavathi River =

River in Karnataka and Tamil Nadu, India

Suvarnavathi River Honnuhole, Honhole River
- Location within Karnataka Location within Tamil Nadu Location within India
- Native name: ಸುವರ್ಣಾವತಿ ನದಿ (Kannada); सुवर्णवती नदी (Hindi)

Physical characteristics
- Source
  - location: Attugulipura, Chamarajanagara, Karnataka
  - coordinates: 11.8189°N 77.0550°E
  - elevation: 720 metres (2,360 ft)
- Mouth: Kaveri River
  - location: Hampapura, Mysore, Karnataka
  - coordinates: 12.1754°N 77.0724°E
  - elevation: 770 metres (2,530 ft)
- Length: 88 kilometres (55 mi)

Basin features
- Waterbodies: Suvarnavathi Reservoir

The Suvarnavathi River, also called the Honnuhole or Honhole river, is a 88 kilometres (55 mi) southern tributary of the Kaveri River in the Indian states of Karnataka and Tamil Nadu. Its drainage area is about 1,787 square kilometres (690 sq mi). The river begins at Badibadga in the Nasurghat hills of southern Karnataka's Mysore district as the convergence of two streams, the Niredurgihalla and Araikaduhalla. It is joined by two significant tributaries, the Chikkahole and the Yenehole, on its journey, generally to the east, to the Kaveri.

The Suvarnavathi Reservoir, entirely in Karnataka, is formed by the Suvarnavathi Dam built across the river. The dam is adjacent to the Karnataka State Forest near Punajanur along the border between Karnataka and Tamil Nadu.

== Dam ==
The Suvarnavathi Dam is located near the village of Attugulipura, Chamarajanagara District, Karnataka, India. It is adjacent to National Highway 948, and is about 14 kilometres (8.7 mi) from Chamarajanagara, a town of about 70,000 (as of 2011) which is headquarters of the district. The reservoir was built in 1977 on the National Highway 948 between Bengaluru and Coimbatore. Suvarnavathi reservoir has a storage capacity of 8,576,400 m^{3} (302,870,000 cu ft). It was constructed at a cost of about ₹ 299.60 lakhs in 1977. The dam is 1,170 metres (3,840 ft) long and is 25 metres (82 ft) above the river bed level.

=== Reservoir ===
Suvarnavathy Dam
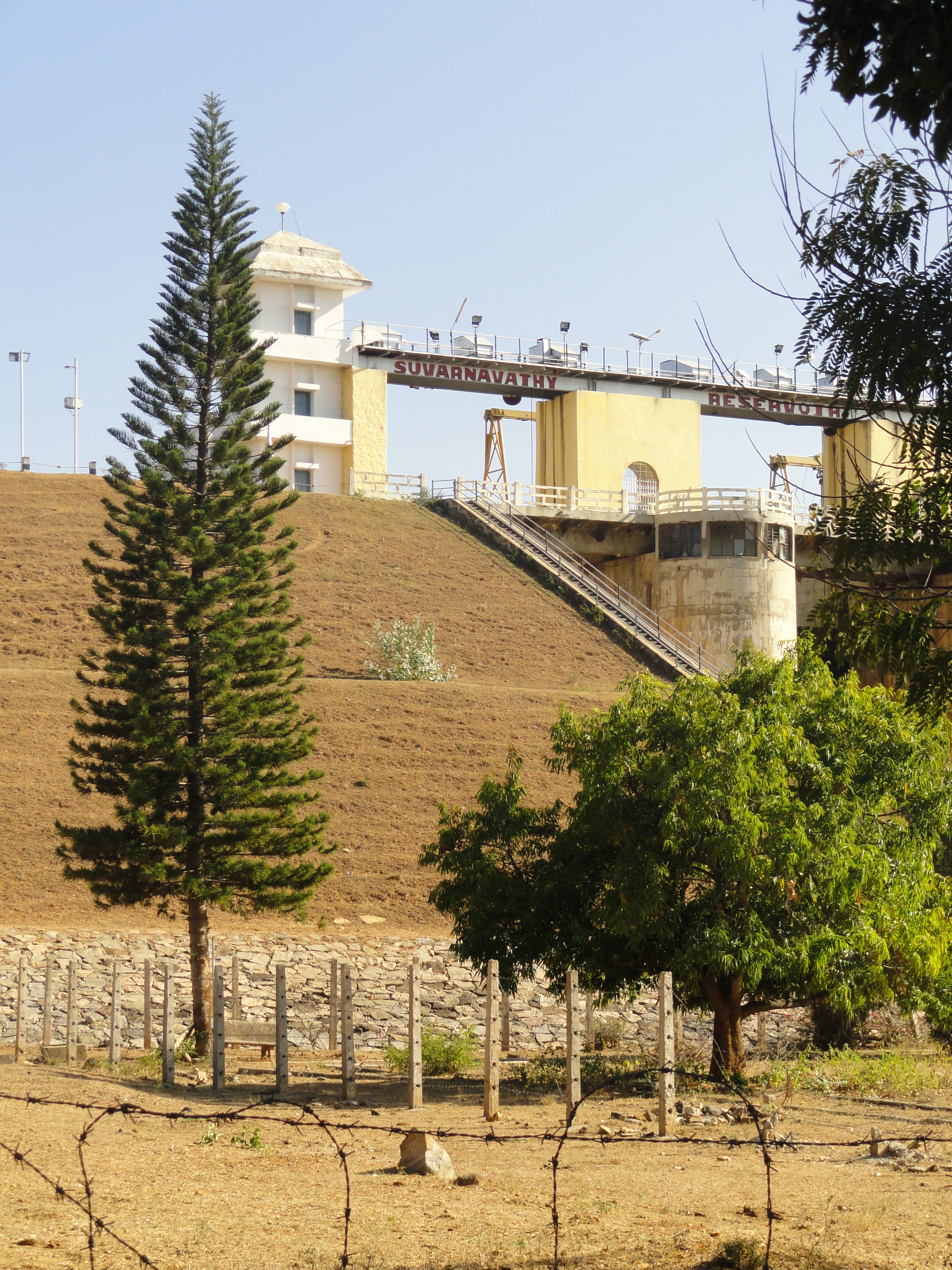
- Suvarnavathy Dam
- Interactive map of Suvarnavathy Dam
- Coordinates: 11.8278°N 77.0262°W
- Type: Reservoir
- River sources: Suvarnavathi River
- Basin countries: India
- Built: 1977
- Water volume: 8,576,400 m^{3} (302,870,000 cu ft)

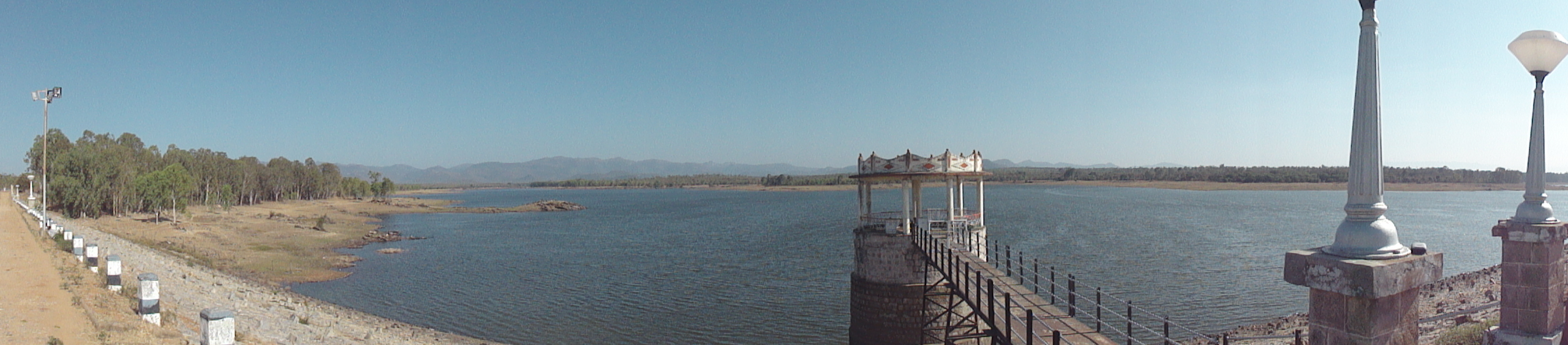

In 2019, it was believed that the twin reservoirs could go dry. In addition to the effect of general drought, this was due to the fact that Tamil Nadu had quietly pursued a program to build dozens of small dams in villages upstream from the reservoirs (villages including Kodipura, Thalamali, Nithapura, Egalur, Chikkahalli, Marur, Malajanapura) to preserve water for their use. Previously, a heavy rainfall in the Talwandi catchment area in Tamil Nadu would reach and fill the Chikkahole reservoir, and overflow from there would also raise the level of the Suvarnavathi reservoir. In 2019 however "despite good rainfall for a couple of weeks in Tamil Nadu, not a drop has flown into Chikkahole reservoir."

An analysis published in 2022 assesses the dam's spillway capacity to be inadequate, and that a height increase of the dam is needed, else 46 villages and a city are at undue risk of flooding, which will be prohibitively expensive if it occurs.

About 3 kilometres (1.9 mi) away is Chikkahole Reservoir, created by the Chikkahole Dam, which is linked to the Suvarnavathi Reservoir by a channel. The Suvarnavathi and Chikkahole are called twin reservoirs. Both of them are in the back drop of beautiful nature. Fisheries and horticulture are the main occupation of this area. The added attraction of these reservoirs are seen in the wandering of wildlife all around.

The Suvarnavathi Reservoir is the main source of water for irrigation in nearby villages; it usually is full by end of the monsoon season and dry during summer season. The main source of water for the reservoir is rainfall in the Punanjanur (Punajur) forest area during the monsoon. Also it is the source of drinking water for wild animals as it is adjacent to the thick forest.

== Accessibility ==
Numerous bus and train services provide transportation from Bangalore to the town Chamarajanagara town, and then it is around 10 kilometres (6.2 mi) further to the Suvarnavathi Dam. Local transport bus service is available for the last leg.

== See also ==
Nearby attractions include:

- Bandipura Reserve Forest
- Bhavanisagar Dam
- Biligiriranga Hills
- Gaganachukki and Barachukki Falls
- Male Mahadeswara Hill
- Satyamangalam
