= Talavady block =

Talavady block is a revenue block in Talavady taluk, Erode district of Tamil Nadu, India. It has a total of 10 panchayat villages including Talavady.
