= Hasanur =

Village in Tamil Nadu

Hasanur or Hassanur is a village in Thalavadi taluk, Erode district, Tamil Nadu, India. In 2011 it had an area of 1,066 hectares and a population of 4,454.

Hasanur village is in the forest of the same name and is part of Sathyamangalam Wildlife Sanctuary. Hasanur is connected to Chamarajanagar and Coimbatore by National Highway 948 (Old 209). There are a few private resorts within the village itself and in its vicinity.
