= Bannari Mariamman Temple =

Arulmigu Sri Bannari Mariamman Temple
- பண்ணாரி அம்மன் திருக்கோயில்
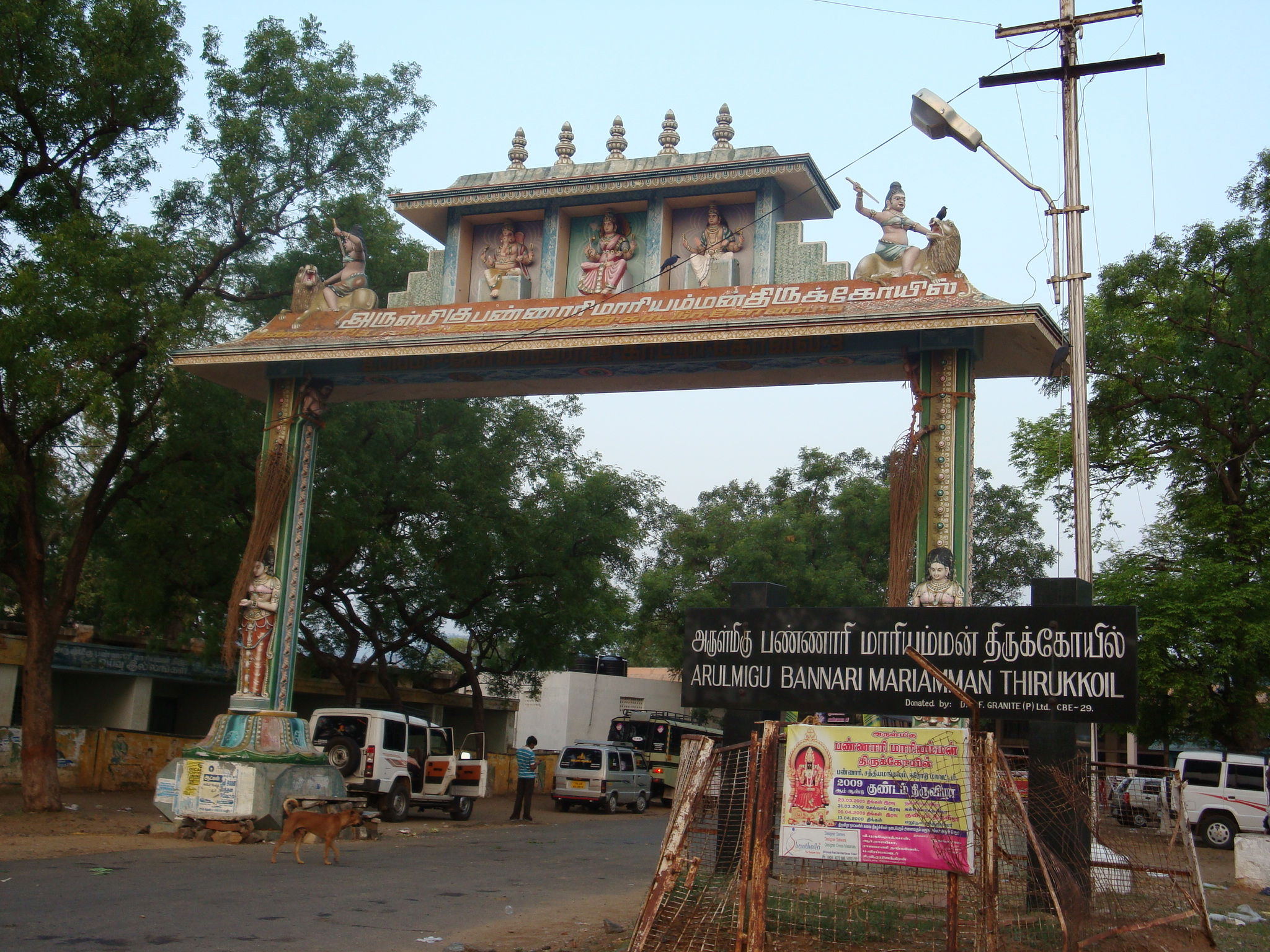
- Bannari Amman Temple Entrance

Religion
- Affiliation: Hinduism
- District: Erode
- Deity: Goddess Bannari
- Festival: Panguni Kundam festival

Location
- Location: Bannari, Sathyamangalam
- State: Tamil Nadu
- Country: India
- Interactive map of Arulmigu Sri Bannari Mariamman Temple
- Coordinates: 11°33′10.7″N 77°08′21.4″E

Website
- http://www.bannariammantemple.tnhrce.in/

Arulmigu Sri Bannari Mariamman Temple is an Amman temple in the Indian state of Tamil Nadu. It is located near Sathyamangalam, Erode district.

The main deity is goddess Bannari, (the goddess of rain), an avatar of goddess Shakti. The goddess is considered powerful in Tamil and Kannada folklore. Nearly every village in the Kongu region of Tamil Nadu has a Mariamman temple. The temple complex also has shrines dedicated to Vinayaka, Bommarayan, Madeswara, Sarugu Mariamman and Muniyappa.

== History ==
According to the official website of the Arulmigu Bannari Mariamman Temple the region where the temple is located was part of Kongu Nadu. It was an oracle who led villagers to construct a small shrine dedicated to the goddess. It was a thatched structure made from kanangu, a forest herb. Later the was renovated to the current structure. In 1967, the 24-pillared Shobana Mandapa was constructed.

Another history of the temple is that during the 16th century, the deity idol was transported by cart from Mannarkkadu in the Palakkad district of Kerala.

== Miracles ==
During the British time, a British officer tried to prohibit dance, drumming and music during the temple festival. He reportedly had a vision in which two maiden appeared with snakes around their necks. He withdrew the order following this. Another story is a British officer who lost his vision after firing gun at the temple wall. He got his vision back after the sacred water from temple was sprinkled.

== Kundam Festival ==
Kundam Festival is celebrated in the Tamil Month of Panguni (March - April). Lakhs of devotees from different directions throng the temple in this month. Erode district observes a local holiday during this festival.

== See also ==
- Mariamman
- Periya Mariyamman Temple
