= Gokak agitation =

Linguistic rights agitation

The Gokak agitation was a successful language rights agitation in the 1980s that fought for the first-language status of the Kannada language in the South Indian state of Karnataka.

It was named after the committee headed by Vinayaka Krishna Gokak, which recommended giving primacy to Kannada in state schools.

== Three-language formula and opposition ==
Karnataka had adopted the three-language formula for education in schools since the linguistic reorganization of states in 1956. Strong opposition to Hindi was witnessed in the 1960s and '70s, leading to Kannada speakers leaning towards English. This created a wide incompatibility between languages used for state administration and education in Karnataka. Sanskrit was the first language at the time in Karnataka high schools, making the state language, Kannada, the third choice, with no requirement that students learn the language spoken by the majority population in high school.

Matters came to a head after a series of changes to the statuses of the various languages. D. Devaraj Urs, chiefminister of the state from 1972 to 1977 and 1978–80, moved Kannada (and other languages) to the first and second language groups, and Sanskrit to the third; when he lost power, in 1980, R. Gundu Rao moved Sanskrit back to the first. The result was widespread protests, and Rao's government set up a committee, headed by Vinayaka Krishna Gokak. The committee published its report in January 1981, and its recommendations included that Sanskrit not be included as a first language, and that Kannada be the only first language taught at the high school level, and that it be mandatory after Class 3 in primary education. A popular uprising supported the conclusions of the report, with actor Rajkumar assuming a leading position. Seven people were killed by police during the protests, but the popular pressure made the government yield and adopt the committee's recommendations.

Many groups from backwards castes supported the agitation, while the middle and upper classes were ambivalent: "They wanted English medium schools for their children but at the same time wanted Karnataka and the Kannada language as an emotional succour". "Prolonged agitation" by those who favored Kannada led to a decision by the Karnataka government in 1982 to accord "first language" status to Kannada, and make its teaching mandatory in primary schools. The order was challenged by linguistic minorities and their educational institutions; the state's High Court struck the order down in 1989.

== See also ==
- Kannada Rajyothsava
