= Germalam =

Village in India

Germalam is a village in Sathyamangalam taluk of Erode district, Tamil Nadu, India. It is 4000 feet above sea level. The village is near to Karnataka state border. The village is part of Sathyamangalam Wildlife Sanctuary. Notorious bandit Veerappan used to visit Germalam village.
