= Kidnapping of Dr. Rajkumar =

Abduction of an Indian actor

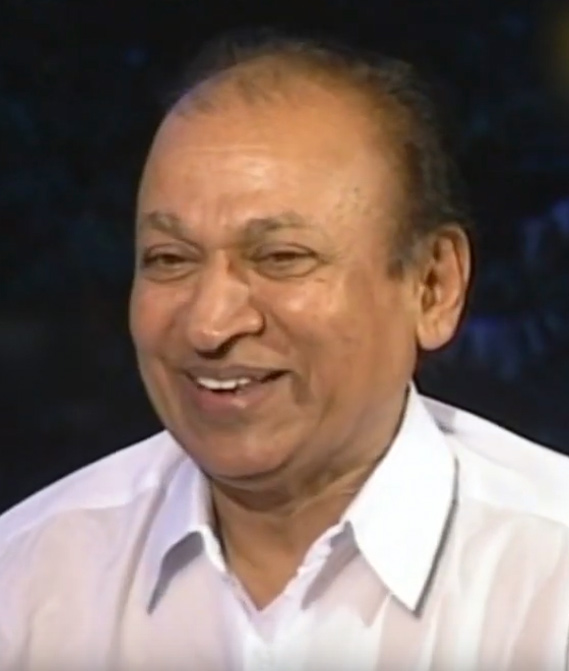
- Dr. Rajkumar in 1995
- Date: 30 July 2000 – 15 November 2000
- Duration: 108 days
- Venue: Gajanur, Tamil Nadu, India
- Location: Near Sathyamangalam forest
- Type: Kidnapping
- Cause: Ransom and political demands
- Target: Dr. Rajkumar
- Perpetrator: Veerappan's forest brigands
- Organised by: Veerappan's gang
- Outcome: Victim released after negotiations
- Arrests: Multiple associates later captured

Kannada film actor Dr. Rajkumar was abducted by the Indian bandit Veerappan on July 30, 2000, during the course of an armed attack on a farmhouse belonging to the actor in Gajanur, India. Rajkumar was released by Veerappan on November 15, 2000, after spending 108 days in his custody. The abduction resulted in further deterioration of already strained relations between the Indian states of Tamil Nadu and Karnataka, creating a tense situation in the two states.

== Background ==
Abducting people and ransoming them for political favours was a part of Veerappan's modus operandi. In 1997, Veerappan kidnapped nine forest officials at Marapala in the Burude forests of Kollegala taluk and demanded an official pardon from the government in return for releasing them. However, the hostages were eventually released after 7 weeks in captivity with no concessions to Veerappan's demands.

According to Rajkumar's son, Raghavendra Rajkumar, the Special Task Force (STF) appointed to capture Veerappan, had warned him about the possibility of an abduction a year prior to his eventual capture. But Rajkumar had ignored them joking that by abducting him, Veerappan would get nothing more than "a shirt and a dhoti".

== Attack, abduction, and aftermath ==
At around 9:30 PM on July 30, 2000, Veerappan attacked Rajkumar's farmhouse in Gajanur in Tamil Nadu with an armed band of 10 or 12 men. Rajkumar had travelled to Gajanur on July 27, 2000, to conduct the house-warming ceremony for a new house that he had constructed. Rajkumar had just finished dinner when Veerappan and his gang barged in.

According to Parvathamma Rajkumar, wife of Rajkumar, Rajkumar and his family members were watching television when Veerappan entered the house and asked in Kannada, "We want sir!" They led Rajkumar out of the house, and into the pouring rain. Once they were outside, Veerappan questioned Rajkumar about the other people in the house. Based on this information, Veerappan returned to the house and also kidnapped Rajkumar's son-in-law S. A. Govindaraj, another relative, Nagesh, and Nagappa, an assistant film director. Rajkumar was released 108 days later. A police official later claimed a ransom of 300 million rupees was paid to secure the actor's release; however, Rajkumar's family has denied this claim.

The Inspector-General of Police, Tamil Nadu, M. Balachandran and Commander of the STF, Harshavardhan Raju were at a meeting in Dimbum, 55 kilometres from Rajkumar's farmhouse in Gajanur at the time of the abduction. Based on a tip-off that Veerappan would be visiting a Hindu temple in Dimbum, they laid a trap to capture him.

== See also ==
- List of kidnappings
- List of solved missing person cases (post-2000)
- Prem Nazirine Kanmanilla
