= Periya Mariamman Temple =

- பெரிய மாரியம்மன் திருக்கோயில்
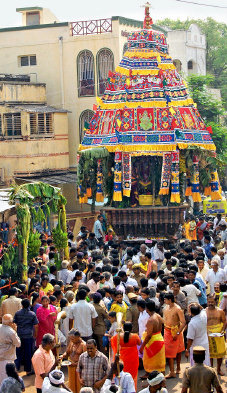
- Periya Mariamman Temple Car procession

Religion
- Affiliation: Hinduism
- District: Erode
- Deity: Goddess Mariamman
- Festival: Panguni Ther Thiruvizha

Location
- Location: Panneer Selvam Park
- State: Tamil Nadu
- Country: India
- Interactive map of Periya Mariamman Temple
- Coordinates: 11°20′20.8″N 77°43′29.7″E

Architecture
- Creator: Kongu Cholas

Website
- http://www.erodeperiyamariamman.tnhrce.in/

Periya Mariamman Temple (Tamil:பெரிய மாரியம்மன் திருக்கோயில்) is located near Panneer Selvam Park, opposite to Erode Corporation Building in the city of Erode, Tamil Nadu, India. It is dedicated to Mariamman, the Hindu Goddess. Kongu Cholas built the temple 1200 years ago.

== Group Temples ==
Along with this Periya Mariamman Temple, the Devasthanam includes two other temples in the city.

- Chinna Mariamman Temple in Periyar Street
- Vaikkal Mariamman Temple at Karaivakkal

Also, there are lot many other Mariamman temples inside the city including Karungalpalayam Mariamman, Nadu Mariamman, Narayana Valasu Mariamman, Kumulankuttai Mariamman, Ellai Mariamman. But, Periya Mariamman in worshipped as the Head of all Mariammans in the City.

== Festivals ==
Every year, during the Tamil month of Panguni (March- April), a grand festival is celebrated in the City. The festival will start in the first Tuesday of Panguni simultaneously at Periya Mariamman, Chinna Mariamman and Vaikkal Mariamman Temples. The other activities in the celebration includes

- Kambam Naduthal
- Maa vilakku
- Karagam Eduthal
- Pongal
- Therottam (Temple Car procession)
- Manjal Neerattu

The celebrations happen for 20 days between Kambam Naduthal and Manjal Neerattu.

== See also ==
- Bannari Amman Temple
- Mariamman temples
