= Aakasmika =

- Film poster
- Directed by: T. S. Nagabharana
- Written by: Ta Ra Su
- Screenplay by: T. S. Nagabharana
- Produced by: S. A. Govindaraju
- Starring: Rajkumar; Madhavi; Geetha
- Cinematography: S. V. Srikanth
- Edited by: P. Bhaktavatsalam
- Music by: Hamsalekha
- Production company: Sri Nirupama Combines
- Distributed by: Sri Vajreshwari Combines
- Release date: 20 July 1993
- Running time: 146 minutes
- Country: India
- Language: Kannada

Aakasmika (transl. Unexpected) is a 1993 Indian Kannada language action thriller film directed by T. S. Nagabharana. The film stars Rajkumar, Geetha and Madhavi. The film was based on Ta Ra Su's trilogy Aakasmika – Aparadhi – Parinama thereby becoming the second Kannada movie to be based on three novels, the first being 1973 movie Naagarahaavu which incidentally was based on three novels of the same writer.

The movie was produced by S. A. Govindaraju and has music and lyrics written by Hamsalekha. The film opened to packed houses across Karnataka for many months and won many awards and critical acclaim. The film was highly successful at the box office. The movie saw a theatrical run of 25 weeks. At the age of 64, Rajkumar won his 8th Filmfare Award for Best Actor – Kannada Category. The song "Huttidare Kannada" is still considered one among the top Kannada songs.

== Plot ==
ACP Narasimha Murthy places a wreath at the grave of his wife Clara. It is shown in a flashback that after attending a wedding, Murthy boards a train headed to Bangalore; Indira and Vyasaraya are his co-passengers. Vyasaraya and Murthy connect over their interests in theatre. At a terminal, the former alights his cigar for refreshment, while Inspector Rajagopal boards; he states that he is on a lookout for a pimp and details the pimp's description to Murthy, who turns out to be Vyasaraya.

Later, Vyasaraya reappears brandishing a knife fending off Murthy, who is now protective of Indira. However, Murthy and Indira get off the train out to panic and find themselves at night to stay in a house. Indira reveals to Murthy that Vyasaraya had paid her poor mother ₹1,000 (US$10) with a promise that he would ensure that the former joins a Gubbi Drama Company. The following morning, Vyasaraya takes Indira away after fighting off Murthy with the help of his henchmen. A devastated Murthy reaches out to Rajagopal to find Indira but with no luck.

Murthy tries to regain his life after the disturbing incident until he sees a drunk woman, Clara, driving her car on a railway track. He saves her from a certain injury and drives to her lodging. There, he meets her brother Anthony who reasons that Clara's broken engagement to Reggie, due to his infidelity behind her taking to heavy drinking. As days progress, Clara and Murthy get closer, develop a liking towards each other and get married. While at their honeymoon, Clara falls off a ravine; the railing she has leaned on gives way and she falls down the rock-face to her death.

A hapless Murthy's attempt to rescue her only leaves him injured. In the present, he is shown laying wreath on her grave, and returns to his car to find that his friends have turned up hoping to cheer him, but Murthy tells them that he is doing fine. Life's vicissitudes have only made him stronger. Murthy makes his way to a Central Jail looking for a woman named Anandi, who has been in prison for three years. He is told that she is on her death bed. He visits and finds out that she was a pimp. she dies without being of any help to him. He later receives a letter written by Anandi, that mentions names of her three associates: Vyasaraya, Thipparaju and Kaatayya.

Murthy sets his subordinates on their trail. A man by the name of Kaatesh, who seems to have recently amassed a significant amount of wealth is summoned under the false pretext of having recovered some stolen property that belong to him. When Kaatesh denies having ever been burgled, Murthy convinces him to make a statement in writing. Having obtained his handwriting sample, Murthy has it cross-verified with that belonging to the letters found among Anandi's belongings, and the comparison reveals that Kaatesh is indeed Kaatayya.

Under police custody, Kaatesh reveals that Tipparaju is dead, but Vyasaraya lives in Hubli. Murthy heads to Hubli and locates the house where Vyasaraya is running his prostitution racket. He locates Vaikuntaiah, Vyasaraya's aide, and thrashes him into submission to reveal that Vysaraya has left for Bangalore by train that evening. Murthy pursues the train and boards it during its following stop. While looking for Vyasaraya, he notices a girl being chased by a couple of goons at the railway platform. He gives them a chase, and as he catches up with the girl, realises it is Indira.

Indira tries to attack him, assuming he is one of Vysaraya's henchman. Upon realising it is Murthy, she breaks down and reveals the incidents that transpired after Vysaraya took her from the house. she killed a man, who tried to molest her and has been constantly on the run since. Vyasaraya's henchmen appear and engage Murthy in a fist fight; Vyasaraya is killed after his leg gets trapped in the railway track and an oncoming train runs over him. Murthy and a relieved Indira walk into the darkness.

== Cast ==
- Rajkumar as Inspector Narasimha Murthy / Murthy
- Madhavi as Clara, Murthy's wife
- Geetha as Indira
- Vajramuni as Vyasraya
- Thoogudeepa Srinivas as Kaatayya alias "Kaatesh"
- M. S. Umesh as Sridhar, Murthy's friend
- Sundar Raj as Bhoja, Murthy's friend
- Mandeep Roy as Srikanth, Murthy's friend
- Satish as Anthony, Clara's brother
- Avinash as Reggie
- Krishne Gowda as Rajagopal
- Shani Mahadevappa as Vaikuntaiah
- Shankanada Anjanappa as Constable
- K. Praveen Nayak as Sub-Inspector Vishwanath
- Agro Chikkanna
- Pandari Bai as Murthy's mother
- Shanthamma as Rajeeva, Indira's mother
- Jorge Indira
- Roger Narayan as Raja

== Production ==
Nagabharana had revealed that Shiva Rajkumar was supposed to be the hero of this film, but after listening to the script and at the insistence from Chi. Udayashankar, it was decided that it should be made with Rajkumar and accordingly the script was modified. The song "Huttidare" was shot at the Rani Chennamma circle and the Siddharoodh Math, in the city of Hubli, Karnataka. Over 6000 policemen were deputed when this song was being filmed to manage the crowds. Rajkumar's grandson Vinay Rajkumar, then aged four made a brief appearance in the song.

== Soundtrack ==
Aakasmika

Soundtrack album by Hamsalekha
- Released: 10 March 1993
- Genre: Feature film soundtrack
- Length: 23:58
- Label: Akash Audio

The music of the film and soundtracks were scored by Hamsalekha. The song "Huttidare Kannada", composed in Sindhubhairavi Carnatic raaga, went on to become a blockbuster hit and "unofficial state anthem". It was remixed in Cheluveye Ninna Nodalu (2010) featuring his son Shivrajkumar. The song "Aagumbeya Prema Sanjeya" became popular for its foot-tapping melody. The album has five soundtracks. Rajkumar insisted on using the song Anuraagava Bhoga which his father used to sing in the stage play Echchamma Naayaka.

Track listing
No.	Title	Lyrics	Singer(s)	Length
1.	"Huttidare Kannada"	Hamsalekha	Dr. Rajkumar	4:46
2.	"Baaluvantha Hoove"	Hamsalekha	Dr. Rajkumar	5:18
3.	"Ee Kannigu Hennigu"	Hamsalekha	Dr. Rajkumar, Manjula Gururaj	4:59
4.	"Aagumbeya Prema"	Hamsalekha	Dr. Rajkumar, Manjula Gururaj	5:00
5.	"Anuragava Bhoga"	Hamsalekha	Dr. Rajkumar	3:55
Total length:				23:58

== Awards ==
Karnataka State Film Awards

- Second Best Film — S. A. Govindaraju
- Karnataka State Film Award for Best Male Playback Singer — Rajkumar

Filmfare Awards South

- Best Film – Kannada — S. A. Govindaraju
- Best Actor – Kannada — Rajkumar
- Best Music Director – Kannada — Hamsalekha
