= Sathyamangalam taluk =

Sathyamangalam taluk is a taluk of Erode district of the Indian state of Tamil Nadu. The headquarters of the taluk is the town of Sathyamangalam. Recently, this taluk has been bifurcated to form the new Thalavadi taluk in 2016, for the betterment of tribal people living in Sathyamangalam Tiger Reserve It comes under Gobichettipalayam Revenue Division.

== Demographics ==
According to the 2011 census, the taluk of Sathyamangalam had a population of 331,993 with 166,964 males and 165,029 females. There were 988 women for every 1000 men. The taluk had a literacy rate of 60.43. Child population in the age group below 6 was 14,118 Males and 13,561 Females. After bifurcation process, the present Sathyamangalam taluk will have a population of 268,594 approximately.
