= Bannari =

Village in India

- village
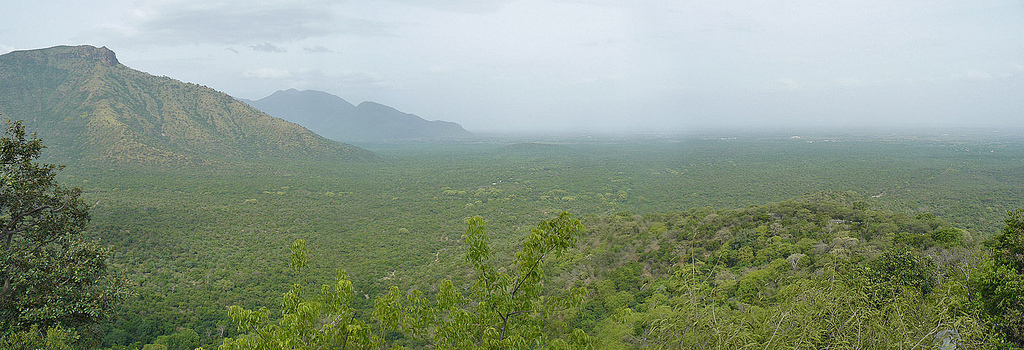
- Bannari plains seen from Dhimbam slopes

- Location within Tamil Nadu
- Coordinates: 11.5667°N 77.1500°E
- Country: India
- State: Tamil Nadu
- Region: Kongu Nadu
- District: Erode

Population (2001)
  - Total: 7,695
- Vehicle registration: TN-36

Bannari is a small village located at a distance of 12 km from Sathyamangalam town and 35 km from Gobichettipalayam town in Erode District and 62 km from Tiruppur city and 82 km from Coimbatore city on Coimbatore-Bangalore NH 209 and it is close to Tamil Nadu and Karnataka border (20 km).

== Bannari Amman Temple ==
The Bannari Amman Temple (a Hindu deity temple) is situated here. The temple draws huge crowds all over from Tamil Nadu and Karnataka throughout the year. The temple Kundam festival is celebrated in the Tamil Month of Panguni (March — April).

== Getting there ==
=== By road ===
There are lot of buses from Sathyamangalam(13 km), Bhavanisagar, Thalavadi and Chamarajanagar (60 km) to reach Bannari.

The buses from Erode, Gobichettipalayam, Tiruppur and Coimbatore to Mysore, Chamarajanagar and Kollegal on NH 209 also passes through Bannari. One can also get the buses from Punjai Puliampatti via Bhavanisagar, this is a shortest route to reach Bannari from Coimbatore. On every Sunday, Monday, Friday and new moon days there are special buses to the temple from Sathyamangalam, Punjai Puliampatti, Gobichettipalayam, Tiruppur, Erode and Coimbatore.

=== By rail ===
The nearest railway station is Mettupalayam, the other major railways stations are Erode, Coimbatore, Tiruppur or Chamarajanagar.

=== By air ===
The nearest airport is Coimbatore International Airport about 85 km from Bannari.

== See also ==
- Bannari Amman Temple
