= Huttidare Kannada =

"Huttidare Kannada Nadinalli Huttabeku"

Song by Dr. Rajkumar

from the album Aakasmika
- Language: Kannada
- Released: 10 March 1993
- Genre: Feature film soundtrack
- Length: 4:46
- Label: Akash Audio
- Songwriter: Hamsalekha

"Huttidare Kannada Nadal Huttabeku" is a Kannada song composed and written by Hamsalekha for the 1993 film Aakasmika. It was sung by Kannada cinema's most celebrated actor, Dr. Rajkumar, who also performed to the song in the film. The song was considered a turning point in Kannada cinema and took Rajkumar's image to new heights.

In the song, the narrator asserts pride in being a Kannadiga. Due to its themes representing the pride in being a Kannadiga, the song is widely embraced and still seen as the unofficial anthem for the Kannada people.

== Picturisation ==
Rajkumar stars as Murthy, a police officer in the film. The song was shot at the Rani Chennamma circle and the Siddharoodh Math, in the city of Hubli, Karnataka. Murthy dressed in the traditional Kannadiga costume consisting of yellow coloured turban, red waist-wrap, white shirt and dhoti, sings the song.

== Cultural references ==
- Shivarajkumar, the first son of Rajkumar performed to the remixed version of the song in his 2010 film, Cheluveye Ninne Nodalu.
