= Dr. Rajkumar =

Indian actor and singer (1929–2006)

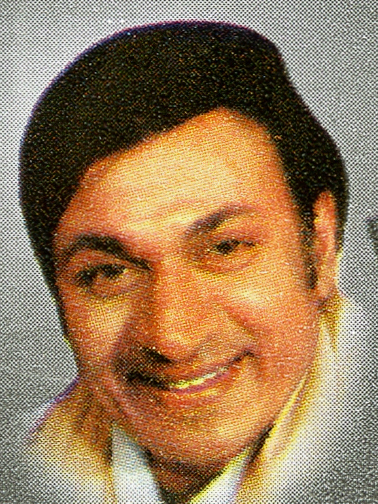
- Born: Singanalluru Puttaswamaiah Muthuraj; 24 April 1929; Doddagajanur, Madras Presidency, British Raj
- Died: 12 April 2006 (aged 76); Bangalore, Karnataka, India
- Monuments: Kanteerava Studios
- Occupations: Actor; singer
- Years active: 1942–2005
- Works: Full list
- Movement: Gokak agitation
- Spouse: Parvathamma Rajkumar (m. 1953)
- Children: 5, including Shiva, Raghavendra, Puneeth
- Family: Rajkumar family
- Awards: Full list
- Honors: Honorary Doctorate (1976); Padma Bhushan (1983); Kentucky Colonel (1985); National Film Award for Best Male Playback Singer (1992); Karnataka Ratna (1992); Dadasaheb Phalke Award (1995); Nadoja Award (1999); NTR National Award (2002)

Singanalluru Puttaswamaiah Muthuraj (24 April 1929 – 12 April 2006), better known by his stage name Dr. Rajkumar, (Note: He was credited as simply Rajkumar before he was awarded an honorary doctorate.) was an Indian actor and singer who worked in Kannada cinema. Regarded as one of the greatest, most influential and versatile actors in the history of Indian cinema, he is considered a cultural icon and holds a matinée idol status in the Kannada diaspora, among whom he is popularly called as Nata Saarvabhouma (Emperor of Actors), Bangarada Manushya (Man of Gold), Vara Nata (Gifted actor), Gaana Gandharva (Celestial singer), Rasikara Raja (King of connoisseurs), Kannada Kanteerava and Rajanna/Annavru (Elder brother, Raj). He was honoured with Padma Bhushan in 1983 and Dadasaheb Phalke Award in 1995. He is the only lead actor to win National Award for Playback singing. His 39 movies have been remade 63 times in 9 languages by 34 actors, making him the first actor whose movies were remade more than fifty times and the first actor whose movies were remade in nine languages. He was the first actor in India to enact a role which was based on James Bond in a full-fledged manner. The success of his movie Jedara Bale is credited to have widely inspired an Indian Bond genre in other Indian film industries. On the occasion of the "Centenary of Indian Cinema" in April 2013, Forbes included his performance in Bangaarada Manushya on its list of "25 Greatest Acting Performances of Indian Cinema". Upon his death, The New York Times described him as one of India's most popular movie stars.

Rajkumar entered the film industry after his long stint as a dramatist with Gubbi Veeranna's Gubbi Drama Company, which he joined at the age of eight before he got his first break as a lead in the 1954 film Bedara Kannappa. He went on to work in over 205 films essaying a variety of roles and excelling in portraying mythological and historical characters in films such as Bhakta Kanakadasa (1960), Ranadheera Kanteerava (1960), Satya Harishchandra (1965), Immadi Pulikeshi (1967), Sri Krishnadevaraya (1970), Bhakta Kumbara (1974), Mayura (1975), Babruvahana (1977) and Bhakta Prahlada (1983). 13 of his films have received National Film Award for Best Feature Film in Kannada (Rajat Kamal) within a span of 15 years from 1954 to 1968. 17 of his films have received Karnataka State Film Awards in five different categories.

Trained in classical music during his theatre days, Rajkumar also became an accomplished playback singer. He mostly sang for his films since 1974. The songs Yaare Koogadali, Huttidare Kannada, Hey Dinakara, Hrudaya Samudra, Manikyaveena and Naadamaya became widely popular. For his rendition of the latter song, he was awarded the National Film Award for Best Male Playback Singer.

He is the only Indian actor to be awarded the Kentucky Colonel, the highest honour bestowed by the Commonwealth of Kentucky in the United States. Well known for his highly disciplined and simple lifestyle both personally and professionally, he was also an avid Yoga, Pranayama, and Carnatic music performer. In 2000, he was kidnapped from his farmhouse at Gajanur by Veerappan and was released after 108 days. He died of cardiac arrest at his residence in Bangalore on 12 April 2006 at the age of 76. His eyes were donated as per his last wish.

In his film career, Rajkumar received eleven Karnataka State Film Awards, including nine Best Actor and two Best Singer awards, eight Filmfare Awards South and one National Film Award. He holds the record of receiving Filmfare Award for Best Actor – Kannada and Karnataka State Film Award for Best Actor the highest number of times. He received the NTR National Award in 2002. He was awarded an honorary doctorate from the University of Mysore. He is a recipient of the Padma Bhushan (1983) and the Dadasaheb Phalke Award (1995) for lifetime contribution to Indian cinema. He was also the first Indian actor to be bestowed with an honorary doctorate for acting.

A mega icon and a socio-cultural symbol for Kannadigas all over the world, he has been credited with redefining Kannada cinema and putting it on the national map. He was the first actor to play the lead role in 100 as well as 200 Kannada movies. His 1986 movie Anuraga Aralithu was the first Indian movie to be remade in seven other languages. He has the distinction of having played the highest number of devotional, mythological and historical characters (combined).

== Early life ==
Singanalluru Puttaswamaiah Muthuraj was born on 24 April 1929 in Dodda Gajanur, a hamlet in the Talavady taluk. His father Puttaswamayya and mother Lakshmamma were impoverished theatre artists from Singanalluru village in Hanur taluk of Chamarajnagara district. His mother tongue was Kannada. Puttaswamayya was good at playing mythological roles such as Kamsa, Ravana, and Hiranyakashipu. Muthuraj left school at eight and was later discovered by film producers, who cast him in small roles that he played till he was 25. He was named Muthuraj, after Muthaththi Raya (a name for the Hindu deity Hanuman), which is a temple deity located in Muthathi, a settlement on the banks of river Kaveri in Malavalli taluk, Mandya District of Karnataka.

== Career ==
=== As actor ===
Muthuraj started his acting career with his father in a drama troupe led by Gubbi Veeranna and later joined the drama company of Subbaiah Naidu. In 1953, he was spotted by film director H. L. N. Simha, who was on the lookout for well-built, pleasant-faced man for the starring role in film, Bedara Kannappa (1954). Simha eventually signed Muthuraj for the film and named him Rajkumar.

Prior to Bedara Kannappa, Rajkumar had appeared as a child artist in the 1942 film Bhakta Prahlada in a small role and also in the 1952 film, Sri Srinivasa Kalyana, as Sage Agasthya, one of the Saptarishis (seven sages). It was an insignificant role in which his scene was over even before he recognised himself.

He acted only in Kannada movies throughout his career apart from one Telugu film, Kalahasti Mahatyam (1954), which was a remake of his debut Kannada movie Bedara Kannappa.

He had lead roles in 205 movies. He owned a production company called Sri Vajreshwari Combines under the banner Dakshayani Combines. Bhagyada Bagilu (1968) was his 100th film, Devatha Manushya (1988) was his 200th film and Shabdavedhi (2000) was his last film.

His character depictions ranged from mythological, historical, devotional, James Bond styled spies to romantic, rural, action roles and portrayals of contemporary social causes in the span of over five decades. Rajkumar along with his contemporaries Udaya Kumar and Kalyan Kumar were referred as the Kumara Thrayaru of Kannada cinema. He acted in 36 films with Udaya Kumar and in 5 films with Kalyan Kumar.

His historical movies such as Ranadheera Kanteerava, Immadi Pulikeshi, Sri Krishnadevaraya and Mayura presented a populist version of Karnataka's history, focusing on the Karnataka kingdoms such as Mysore royalty, The Chalukyas, Vijayanagara Empire and The Kadambas respectively - thereby making him the only Indian actor to have portrayed the role of four prominent kings of Indian history - Kanthirava Narasaraja I, Pulakeshin II, Krishnadevaraya and Mayurasharma. He also appeared as Bijjala II in Jagajyothi Basveshwara and as Raja Mallasarja in Kittur Chennamma.

The other prominent historical characters portrayed by him include Purandara Dasa in Navakoti Narayana, Kanaka Dasa in Bhakta Kanakadasa, Tukaram in Santha Thukaram, Kabir Das in Mahathma Kabir, Kālidāsa in Kaviratna Kalidasa, Gora Kumbhar in Bhakta Kumbara, Sri Raghavendra Swamy in Mantralaya Mahatme, Sarvajna in Sarvagna Murthy, Chetha in Bhakta Chetha, Kaivara Narayanappa in Kaiwara Mahathme, Pundarika in Hari Bhakta, Appanna in Sanaadi Appanna and Santhoba Pavar in Bhakta Vijaya.

He also has the rare distinction of having portrayed the mythological roles of both Devas and Asuras in an almost equal number on the Indian on-screen. While he has played Rama in Sri Ramanjaneya Yuddha, Vishnu in Sri Srinivasa Kalyana, Krishna in Sri Krishna Rukmini Satyabhama, Shiva in Gange Gowri, Narada in Mooroovare Vajragalu, he has also played the role of Ravana in Bhookailasa, Hiranyakashipu in Bhakta Prahlada, Shishupala in Dashavathara, Bhasmasura in Mohini Bhasmasura and Mahishasura in Mahishasura Mardini. His other prominent mythological characters include Kannappa in Bedara Kannappa, Chandrahasa in Chandrahasa, Harishchandra in Satya Harishchandra, Satyavan in Sathi Savithri, Vasishtha in Mahasathi Arundathi, Valmiki in Valmiki, Chyavana Maharshi in Sathi Sukanya and Dushyanta in Kaviratna Kalidasa. Further, he also holds the distinction of being the only actor to play the role of Arjuna and his two sons. While he appeared as Arjuna in Shree Krishna Gaarudi, he appeared in the role of Nagarjuna in Nagarjuna and as Babruvahana in Babruvahana.

His movies were also noted to include drama sequences where he performs various mythological, historical or literary characters such as Romeo and Babruvahana in Amma (1968), Gautama Buddha in Uyyale (1969), Rama in Hasiru Thorana (1970), Echchamanayaka in Bhale Jodi (1970) and as Bhima in Havina Hede (1981). His movies also have dream and song sequences where he appears in various characters such as Kamadeva in Dhruva Thare, as Krishna in Emme Thammanna, Daari Tappida Maga and Bhagyada Lakshmi Baramma.

He has acted in around 50 movies based on novels, plays and short stories, which is the highest for any actor in India. He made movies from Kannada novels and made movies against perceived social evils in movies like Jeevana Chaitra (on evils of alcohol) and Shabdavedhi (on drug abuse).

Between 1954 and 1969, Kannada film industry produced 207 movies within a span of 15 years and Rajkumar starred in 100 of those. While the early 60s saw him appearing in fantasy genre movies such as Rani Honnamma (1960), Aasha Sundari (1960), Devasundari (1962), Bala Nagamma (1966) and Devara Gedda Manava (1967), he was also noted for doing swashbuckler films such as Vidhivilasa (1962), Veera Kesari (1963), Bettada Huli (1965), Katari Veera (1966), Kiladi Ranga (1966), Madhu Malathi (1966), Rajashekara (1967), Rajadurgada Rahasya (1967), Simha Swapna (1968), Jaga Mecchida Maga (1972), Bahaddur Gandu (1976) and Huliya Haalina Mevu (1979) at regular intervals in the 1960s and the 1970s. He also appeared in Cowboy get-up in Pratidwani (1971) and Kranti Veera(1972).

When Rajkumar appeared as CID 999 in Jedara Bale, he became the first Indian actor to enact a spy role modelled on James Bond in a full-fledged manner and was called the James Bond of India. The success of this movie led to three sequels: Goa Dalli CID 999, Operation Jackpot Nalli C.I.D 999 and Operation Diamond Racket. The CID 999 Franchise was the first Indian movie franchise to have four instalments and CID 999 was the first character based trilogy in India.

He acted with heroines of southern cinema such as Jayanti (38 films), Pandaribai (18 films), Leelavathi (28 films), Bharati (26 films), Kalpana (19 films), Aarathi (13 films), B. Saroja Devi (12 films), Rajasree (10 films), Harini (11 films), Krishna Kumari (8 films), Madhavi (7 films), Manjula (7 films), Jayamala (6 films), Lakshmi (5 films), Kanchana(5 films), Geetha (5 films), Saritha (5 films) and Jaya Prada (4 films). Actress Rekha made her debut in a lead role with his movie Operation Jackpot Nalli C.I.D 999. Sri Lankan based actress Sabeetha Perera also made her Indian movie debut with his film Goa Dalli CID 999. Chi. Udaya Shankar has written dialogues and songs for 85 of his movies. G. K. Venkatesh has scored music for 52 of his movies. He also has the distinction of having worked with more than 75 directors.

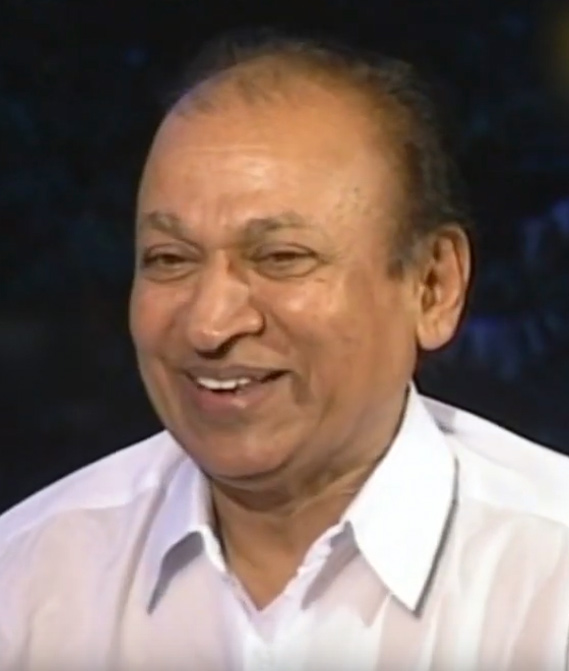
Rajkumar in an interview in 90's

His movie Operation Diamond Racket was shot in Nepal and became the first Kannada movie to be shot outside India. His movie Ondu Muttina Kathe was reported to be the first ever Indian film to have an underwater action sequence shot in an ocean outside India without the help of oxygen mask.

Rajkumar's 1971 movie Kasturi Nivasa was colorised and released in 2014. Even close to a decade after his death, the movie garnered a grand opening with the actor's life-size cutout being immersed in milk. The colorised release also performed well at the box office over taking other Kannada movies released at the time. His 39 movies have been remade 63 times in 9 languages by 34 actors.

=== As singer ===
Rajkumar trained in classical music when he was with Gubbi Veeranna's theatre troupe. The track "Om Namaha Shivaya" from the 1956 film Ohileshwara, which he also starred in, was his first song for a film. He subsequently sang "Thumbithu Manava", a duet with S. Janaki, for the movie Mahishasura Mardini (1959). However, he became a full-fledged singer only in 1974 when he sang in place of P. B. Sreenivas for Sampathige Savaal, who had till then sung for most songs picturised on Rajkumar, fell ill. Rajkumar sang the energetic "Yaare Koogadali" for the film which became widely popular during the time and is considered one of his best songs.

Rajkumar has been credited for having sung across various genres and each rendition according to the mood of the scene in the film. In "Yaaru Tiliyaru Ninna" for Babruvahana (1977), a prosodic form of Kannada poetry that required the tone to be a combination of sarcasm and anger, he blended the twin skills of theatrics and music. For Nee Nanna Gellalare (1981), he sang two songs—"Jeeva Hoovagide" and "Anuraga Enaytu"—beginning both with the refrain "I love you", that is full of Carnatic gamakas. After the same tone in the refrain, they take on a life of their own with the form according to love and happiness in the former and love but a discord in the latter. He is known widely for his rendition of "Nadamaya" for Jeevana Chaitra (1992), a song based on the raga of Todi and with complex graces and strings other ragas as it progresses. He switches ragas with ease, and sings complex swara patterns like a professional classical artiste. For the rendition, he was awarded the National Film Award for Best Male Playback Singer. His frequent collaboration with the composer duo of Rajan–Nagendra gave musical hits such as Bangarada Hoovu (1967), Nyayave Devaru (1971), Swayamvara (1973), Sri Srinivasa Kalyana (1974), Nanobba Kalla (1979) and Chalisuva Modagalu (1982).

Rajkumar's duets are mostly recorded with S. Janaki and Vani Jairam. Other female singers who sang with him are P. Susheela, Bangalore Latha, H. P. Geetha, K. S. Chitra, Swarnalatha, Manjula Gururaj, B. R. Chaya, Kasturi Shankar, Rathnamala Prakash, Sulochana and others.

During his career, Rajkumar sang and performed for songs about Kannadigas, the Kannada language and culture, such as "Jenina Holeyo" from Chalisuva Modagalu, "Maanavanagi Huttidmele" from Jeevana Chaitra and "Huttidare Kannada" from the film Aakasmika. He sang a complete English song called "If You Come Today" ("Tick Tick Tick") in the movie Operation Diamond Racket in 1978. This song became an internet meme in India following Rajkumar's demise in 2006.

In later years, he lent his voice to a few actors and sang background solos. For the song Deepavali Deepavali from Muddina Maava, he provided playback to S. P. Balasubrahmanyam. This was a rare occasion. "Hrudaya Samudra Kalaki" from Ashwamedha and "Hey Dinakara" from Om are the two other popular songs sung by Rajkumar for other actors. He also sang Kalidasa shlokas such as "Maanikya Veena" and ghazal-based songs such as "Sadaa Kannale", "Kanneera Dhaare" and "Yaava Kaviyu".

Rajkumar recorded many devotional songs beginning in the 1970s for Columbia Recording Company starting with "Mantralayakke Hogona" in 1972. His widely popular LP record "Guruvara Bantamma" was also recorded during the time. In 1979, Sangeetha Cassettes became India's first licensed pre-recorded cassettes. Rajkumar sang the devotional songs glorifying the saint Raghavendra and the Hindu deity Hanuman.

Apart from performing in about 75 musical nights, he has sung 300 movie songs and about 200 folk and devotional songs, the proceeds of which were given away to charity.

It was also noted that his versatility and diction contributed immensely to his popularity as a singer since he was able to sing songs of any style - be it qawwali, ghazal, bhajan or English songs - apart from handling a range of emotions - vivacious, romance, devotion or sarcasm.

== Personal life ==
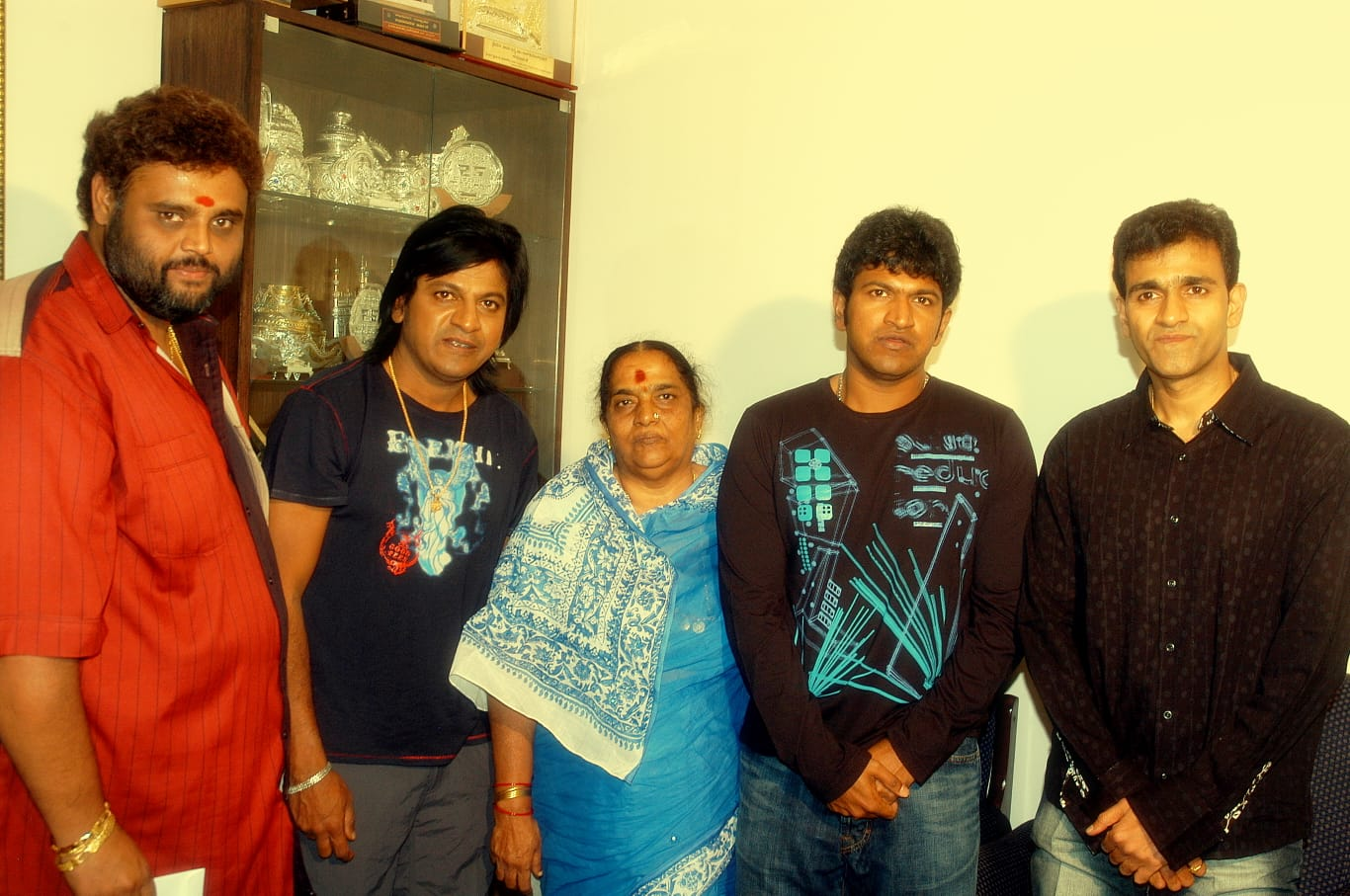
From (L to R) Ravi Srivatsa, Shiva Rajkumar, Parvathamma Rajkumar, Puneeth Rajkumar, Raghavendra Rajkumar

=== Family ===
At the age of 24, Rajkumar married his 14-year-old cousin, Parvathamma, on 25 June 1953 in Nanjangud. This was in accordance with the betrothal that their fathers made following the latter's birth. Together, they had five children: sons Shiva, Raghavendra and Puneeth, and daughters Lakshmi and Poornima. Having lived a "hand to mouth existence" after marriage in a joint family that included 24 children in Madras, the family moved to Bangalore in 1972, after Rajkumar began getting multiple film offers.

== Abduction ==
On 30 July 2000, Rajkumar, his son-in-law Govindaraju and two others were abducted by Veerappan from the actor's palatial house at Gajanur. Veerappan demanded the release of his gang members who were being held in jail under a defunct anti-terrorism law. The event prompted a massive manhunt and threw the Karnataka government into crisis. The Supreme Court of India opined that it was "unpardonable" on the part of the government of Tamil Nadu for not providing security to Rajkumar, although they had information a year earlier that he faced a threat of being kidnapped by Veerappan. A Special Task Force (STF) set up to capture Veerapan had earlier warned Rajkumar against visiting the farmhouse, and his son Raghavendra later acknowledged that his father had not taken the threat seriously.

After a total of 108 days in captivity, Rajkumar was released unharmed on 15 November 2000. His abduction and the manner in which his release was secured remains a mystery.

== Death and memorial ==
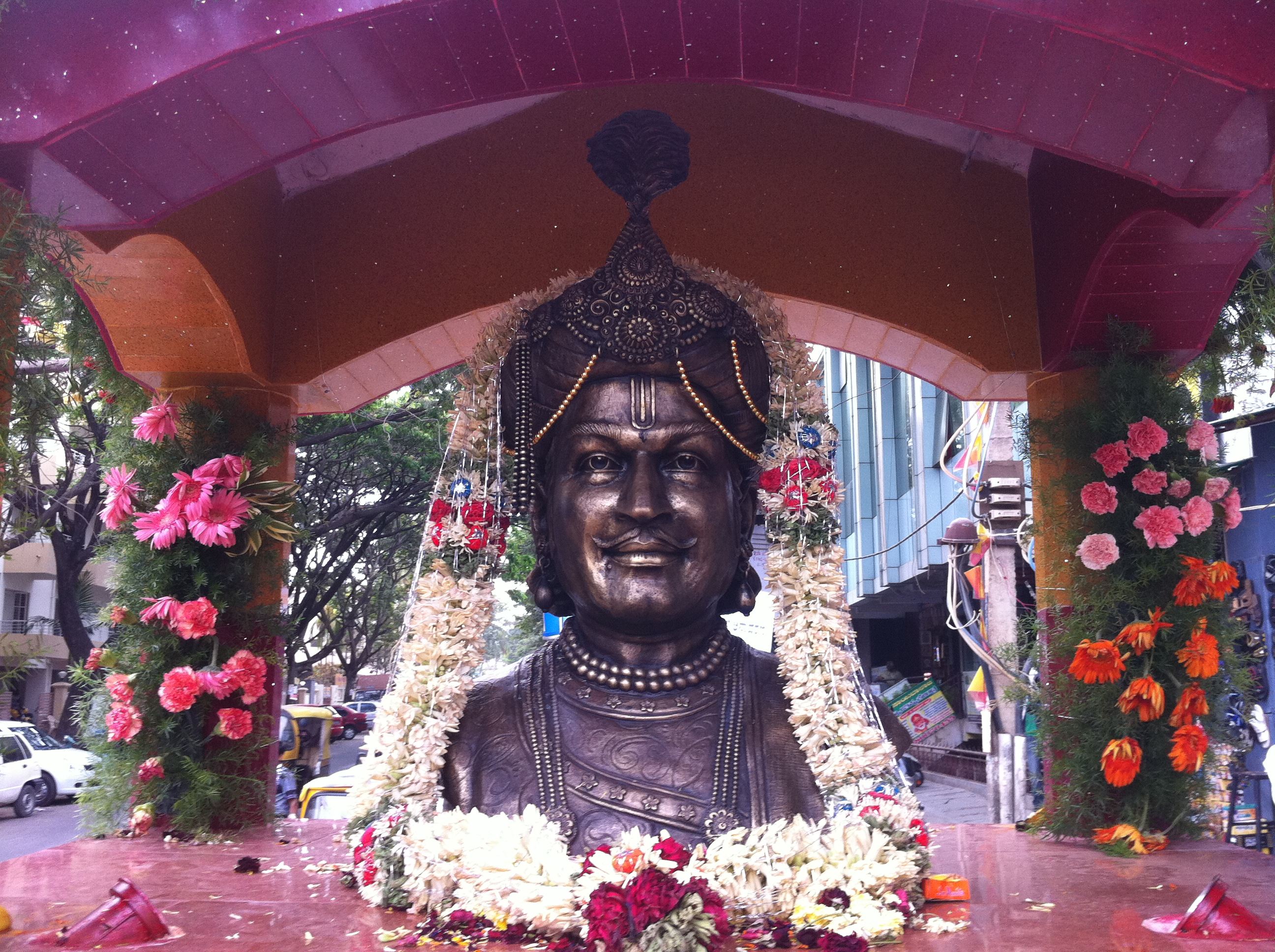
Bust of Rajkumar in Jayanagar

On 12 April 2006, Rajkumar returned to his Sadashivanagar residence after his regular 20-minute walk and had a general medical check-up by 11:30 a.m. (IST). At 1:50 pm (IST), as he sat on a sofa, he asked a member of his family to slow the fan down and immediately collapsed. His personal physician Ramana Rao was called for, who rushed within three minutes, and performed external cardiac massage and mouth-to-mouth resuscitation. Rajkumar was then taken to MS Ramaiah Memorial Hospital and was administered intracardiac injections. Efforts to revive him failed and he was pronounced dead at 2:05 pm (IST). His death occurred 12 days before his 77th birthday. His eyes were donated to two visually impaired persons the same day.

Rajkumar's death triggered an outpouring of grief. There was major shutdown in the city of Bengaluru. An unofficial bandh (closure of all shops and other establishments) was observed. Several people attempted suicide after hearing the news; most of them were rescued. The funeral cortège the next day started from Sree Kanteerava Stadium to Kanteerava Studios a few minutes before 12:30 pm (IST), a distance of 14 kilometres (8.7 mi). Around two million people followed his remains. However, the entire procession was marked with violence with mourners attacking public property, and police, who resorted to lathi-charge and tear gas. Passing through Krishna Raja Circle, Palace Road, T. Chowdiah Road, Sadashivanagar, Yeswanthpur and Goraguntepalya localities, the cortège reached the Studios at 4:45 pm (IST). His body was buried with State honours at 5:45 p.m (IST) at the premises of the studios. The last rites were performed by his eldest son Shiva, guided by priests from the city's ISKCON and the Gayathri Temples.

The then President of India, A.P.J. Abdul Kalam had condoled his death. In the condolence message, he had praised his versatility and everlasting contributions to the Indian cinema.

On 19 April, the government of Karnataka announced that a memorial would be made in Rajkumar's honour at Kanteerava Studios in association with the Karnataka Film Chamber of Commerce at the cost ₹ 100 million. The blueprint of the memorial was cleared by a panel comprising members of Rajkumar's family, representatives of the Kannada film industry and the state government. After a delay over allocation of funds and land, it was finally opened in November 2014, after a sum of ₹ 70 million was used in developing it over an area of 2.5 acres (1.0 ha). It included "an open-air auditorium, mini-water body, landscaping and a bust" of Rajkumar. 40 photographs of selected films of Rajkumar were kept on display at the inauguration. A permanent exhibition on the history of Rajkumar's films that included his photographs, trophies and souvenirs, alongside a stock of dialogue, scripts, songs and other memorabilia associated with him were put on display. An annual calendar for 2012 was released containing photographs of Rajkumar and stills from his films. His fan clubs conduct blood donation and eye donation camps on the occasion of his birth and death anniversaries every year.

After his death, two audio companies - Saregama India Limited and Mars Recording Private Limited - were pitted against each other over the copyright of his songs as per Section 52(j) of The Copyright Act, 1957.

== Acting versatility ==
It was observed that after 15 years into his career, in the mid sixties, when new young filmmakers were searching for actors who were less theatrical, Rajkumar had to undergo a transformation in his acting style and succeeded in proving that he could handle roles which were subtle, mellow and soft without the need for theatrical histrionics. He went on to be known for portraying versatile roles with elan.

He was also praised for his ability to integrate actors' virtues with the power of a superstar without letting one erase the other by acting as a gulf between mainstream popular movies and artistic cinemas. It was also noted that it was his subtle acting prowess, spontaneous style and his flair to give the reel characters a real credibility which singled him out to the top and helped him to never be out of the running by withstanding the onslaught of time, age and the ever changing demands of celluloid world.

Jnanapith awardee U. R. Ananthamurthy had noted that movies of Rajkumar were less melodramatic than the movies of his counterparts at that time in other languages—MGR, Sivaji Ganesan and NTR.

Amitabh Bachchan had praised Rajkumar's simplicity and his ability to perform any role to perfection. Anil Kapoor called him the "emperor of all the actors" and a pride of Indian film industry.

Girish Kasaravalli had called him a great actor by any standards. Jayanth Kaikini had said that the variety and intensity which Rajkumar had managed as an actor was unmatched world over.

When Rajkumar completed 200 movies in lead roles in Kannada films, P. Lankesh edited a special issue of Lankesh Patrike in 1988 titled Innooru Chitragala Raja dedicating to him.

== Social themes of movies ==
Rajkumar made movies against perceived social evils throughout his career. His debut movie Bedara Kannappa (1954) addressed social discrimination. The 1957 movie Rayara Sose speaks against the evil practice of dowry. The 1958 movie Shree Krishna Gaarudi, which narrates the bickering and squabbling among the Pandavas for portfolios, allegorises the politics in the then newly formed Mysore state.

The 1962 movie Bhoodana was based Vinoba Bhave's Bhoodan movement and speaks about the religious conversion of the marginalised. The 1964 movie Naandi was acclaimed for capturing the real-time plights of those with hearing impairments. The 1967 movie Bangarada Hoovu spoke about misconceptions about leprosy - especially the notion that leprosy is a consequence of one's past sins. The 1968 movie Hannele Chiguridaga deals with the empowerment of women in education and widow marriage. The 1968 movie Mannina Maga depicted the difficulty of sustaining community life in a city resulting in turn away from it in favour of a village. The 1969 movie Uyyale presents a delicate tale of the extra-marital love of a woman neglected by her husband reflecting the social and moral laws of married life. The 1969 movie Mayor Muthanna had a sub-plot of salvaging of the sub-standard grain and black marketing.

The 1971 movie Kasturi Nivasa charts the rise of modern manufacturing techniques and the ill effects of orthodox approach towards upgradation of technology. The 1971 movie Sakshatkara speaks about superstitions and manipulation of beliefs. The central theme of 1972 movie Bangaarada Manushya - returning to one's ancestral village - inspired youth to take up agriculture. The film also touched on very important topics like rural development, modern agricultural practices and co-operative movement. The 1973 movie Bidugade speaks about capital punishment based on circumstantial evidence be done away with. The 1973 movie Gandhada Gudi was reported to be the first Indian movie made on the concept of protection of forest and wildlife conservation with a focus on the need to preserve the flora and fauna at a time when the CITES treaty was signed with an aim to reduce the economic incentive to poach endangered species. The 1974 movie Sampathige Savaal speaks subtly about the abolishment of Zamindar system by portraying the rich versus poor in a rural backdrop.

The 1985 movie Jwaalamukhi speaks about marks card forgery. The 1985 movie Dhruva Thare speaks about the oppression by the higher class and the need for the minimum wages. The 1986 movie Anuraga Aralithu speaks about the implementation of labour reforms in factory. The 1987 movie Shruthi Seridaaga made a strong statement against believing horoscope blindly. The 1987 movie Ondu Muttina Kathe was a narration on how the value of objects differ across the social strata, especially among the literate and the illiterate.

The 1992 movie Jeevana Chaitra instigated many villages to ban arrack shops. The 1993 movie Aakasmika was about woman trafficking and prostitution racquet.

His last movie Shabdavedhi (2000) was about drug abuse and its ill effects on the youth.

== Mass appeal and popularity ==
Veteran journalist and writer Patil Puttappa had described Rajkumar as a natural strength of Kannada whose mass appeal was much more than any leader in Indian politics. He was also praised for confining himself to the Kannada cinema through a conscious decision. His movies were praised for showing consistent interest in building a Kannada society and not a Kannada nation as such. They were also noted for holding up the value of civility and refrain from peddling hatred. His presence was reported to have filled the void between the state and the nation which neither the littérateurs nor the politicians could accomplish.

Some observers are of the opinion that his star appeal helped bring together the diverse regions of Karnataka. The state was carved out in 1956, bringing together different regions like Hyderabad Karnataka, which were areas ruled by the erstwhile Nizam of Hyderabad; Mumbai Karnataka, which has a strong Marathi influence; Old Mysore region ruled by the Mysore royal family and the hilly regions and coastal belt. Each region has a distinct identity within the state and Rajkumar was accepted as a Kannada icon across all regions. He spoke Kannada in a distinct way which had a universal appeal across the state. This was an important aspect since his career played out when the state's identity was still evolving. Rajkumar's movies were largely credited for creating a unified Kannada cultural space after the formation of the state. It was reported that before linguistic reorganisation of the states, the default state border for the Kannada speaking population was the last point where Rajkumar films were distributed.

He was considered as a strong symbol of Kannada identity. Bollywood actor Prithviraj Kapoor had requested Rajkumar to act with him in a Hindi movie but Rajkumar had refused the offer in spite of Hindi movies having wider market than Kannada. Later, Prithviraj Kapoor went on to share the screen with him in the Kannada movie Sakshatkara directed by Puttanna Kanagal. He had also refused to appear in a cameo for Amitabh Bachchan's 1983 Hindi movie Coolie as he did not want to appear in a non-Kannada movie. Further, he thought that it would not be good for an actor to look down on another actor as the scene involved Amitabh touching the feet of Rajkumar's character - a sequence which appeared before the introduction song of Amitabh's character. In spite of having appeared only in Kannada movies, he was reasonably popular amongst the non- Kannadigas too. His films have inspired many non-Kannadigas to learn the language. In spite of strong Kannada conservatism in his movies, they were noted to have transcended the barriers of language to connect with the ethos of the nation.

Kuvempu considered him to be the most suitable ambassador to propagate his idea of Universal Human (Vishwamanava). His 1972 movie Bangaarada Manushya was credited for inspiring the urban youth to take up farming by popularising modern farming technology.

Bollywood actor Anil Kapoor had called him "The emperor of all actors". Rana Daggubati had revealed that he had referred Rajkumar's performance in the 1983 movie Bhakta Prahlada for his preparation for the role of Hiranyakashipu.

During the interview for promotions of 2.0, Rajinikanth had said that 10 MGRs were equal to 1 Rajkumar. Rajinikanth had also revealed that the only autograph he has ever taken in his life is of Rajkumar. He had also remarked that Rajkumar was a combination of MGR and Sivaji Ganesan. Vishnuvardhan said he was biggest worshipper of Rajkumar.

B. Saroja Devi called upon the present generation artistes to adopt and emulate the values and ideals cherished by the actor for the growth of the Kannada film industry.

The Pampa Award for writers was instituted by the Government of Karnataka on his behest. The cash prize of ₹1,00,000 which he received with the Dadasaheb Phalke Award was given as donation to Kannada Sahitya Parishat. He gave away the proceeds of 57 musical night programmes as donations to build stadiums in 21 districts of Karnataka.

After Rajkumar's eyes were donated as per his last wish, the eye donation in Karnataka was reported to have increased by 400%. The director of the 2021 Kannada movie Akshi which won the National Film Award for Best Feature Film in Kannada at the 67th National Film Awards had revealed that the act of eye donation by Rajkumar was the inspiration for the plot of his movie.

The initial move to shift the operations of the Kannada cinema gradually from Madras to Bangalore has been credited to Rajkumar's home productions.

As of April 2016, 71 books and 9 souvenirs have been published on Rajkumar. In 2015, after 15 years of research, Doddahulluru Rukkoji released a two-volume, 2,148 page book chronicling Rajkumar's life and achievements. As of May 2023, close to 100 statues of Rajkumar were found in Bangalore alone.

On the occasion of Rajkumar's 90th birthday, an audio-visual musical extravaganza fund raiser programme titled Raj Vaibhava was conducted in Greater Boston for the benefit of a retirement home in Mumbai. In 2012, an entertainment programme called Dr.Raj Vaibhava based on his movies and songs was conducted in Kuwait in his honour.

In 2018, in the run up to the relaunch of Jawa motorbikes, the marketing team of Mahindra & Mahindra used the climax bike stunt sequence of his 1976 movie Naa Ninna Mareyalare as a part of their promotion strategy.

The tableau of Krishnadevaraya at the 2021 Delhi Republic Day parade was reported to be modelled on Rajkumar. The team of the Kannada movie Daredevil Musthafa released an animation song as a tribute to Rajkumar based on the popular theatre song Ninnanthor Yaaru Ilvallo composed by B. V. Karanth in the honour of Mysore King Kanthirava Narasaraja I whose role was portrayed by Rajkumar in the 1960 movie Ranadheera Kanteerava. Flower show conducted at Lal Bagh as a tribute to him on the occasion of 75th Independence Day in August 2022 was attended by 8.34 lakh people generating a revenue of ₹3.33 crore.

=== Politics ===
Political analyst MK Bhaskar Rao had revealed that the Janata Party's J. H. Patel and George Fernandes had approached Rajkumar to contest against Indira Gandhi in the 1978 Chikkamagaluru Lok Sabha byelection but he refused saying he wanted to remain apolitical.

The Hindu had reported that Rajkumar could have swept any poll effortlessly but had decided that the affection and love of the people should not be used to attain power. In the absence of a dedicated political movement for the cause of Kannada and local culture, Rajkumar was considered to have symbolised the hope and angst of a large section of Kannadigas. However, Rajkumar declined to enter politics despite immense pressure as he did not want to be used only as a weapon to defeat anyone and not for any positive contribution. He shunned publicity and politics all his life. He dissociated himself from the fans’ association when its office-bearers decided to contest elections in 1985. He was also credited for protecting and promoting the Kannada language without opting for a political career.

== Lifestyle ==
Rajkumar was known for being a highly disciplined man in both his personal and professional lives. He practised Carnatic music for an hour each day in the morning and in the evening. He was referred to as Gaanagandharva (translation: a heavenly singer). His punctuality is another noted aspect. Waking up every morning at 4 am, he performed Yoga and Pranayama, which is said to be the reason behind his physical and mental fitness. His Yoga performances can be seen in the first clips of his film Kaamana Billu. His waist size was 32 at the time of his death. This fitness is attributed to his practice of Yoga. Actor John Kokken had revealed that Rajkumar was the inspiration behind him performing Yoga every day.

He shunned smoking and drinking both on screen and off. To avoid setting a precedent among his fans, he made sure that the roles he accepted did not require him to smoke or drink or utter swear words, and extended this decision to real life. His dress code always consisted of a simple white dhoti and shirt. He spent most of his vacations in his hometown, Gajanur, near the forest area where he was later abducted.

In 1961, he led a movement to collect funds for drought relief. He would always refer to his movie-producers as Anna Daataru (food providers) and adored fans as Abhimaani Devarugalu (Fan Gods).

He was a devotee of Raghavendra Swami. When Dr. Rajkumar was chosen for the role of saint Raghavendra Swamiji for Mantralaya Mahatme by T.V. Singh Thakur in 1966, there was an objection from the Madhwa community. They were against a non-vegetarian playing the role of Mantralaya seer. However, Dr. Rajkumar gave up non-vegetarian food and lived like a saint during the entire shoot of the film.

Girish Kasaravalli had praised his simplicity, humility, innocence and straight-forwardness. Singeetam Srinivasa Rao called him as one of the two funniest people he has come across in his life. S. P. Balasubrahmanyam had praised his courteous and down to earth nature.

Reminiscing his old days, Kannada director J.G.Krishna had revealed that Rajkumar was responsible for light boys being served food by the film production team after he discovered that they were not being served food on the sets and took initiative to make it mandatory for all Kannada film producers to bear the food cost of the light boys treating them on par with the employees of the production house. Director Dinakar Thoogudeepa had revealed that their Mysore home was named "Mu.Pa.Krupa" after Rajkumar ("Muthuraj - Parvathamma") in order to honour their help and guidance given to his parents.

In 2001, he started Shaktidhaama - a rehabilitation home for 800 destitute women who were rescued from prostitution. He endorsed Karnataka Milk Federation's Nandini brand of milk for free.

A touching testimonial to his commitment to lead by example was that he had pledged his eyes in 1994 at the time of inauguration of Dr. Rajkumar Eye Bank and he rightly did so after his death in 2006. His act of eye donation was likened to the role in his debut movie Bedara Kannappa where he plucks his eyes in the climax to replace the bleeding eyes of the Shivalinga.

== Kannada language movement ==
Although Rajkumar rejected numerous offers to don the political mantle, he was able to influence the State's political fortunes without ever being officially involved in politics. Despite his apolitical outlook, he was able to protect and espouse the cause of Kannada and Karnataka. He continually advocated the cause of seeking primacy for Kannada, was asked to lead a movement to make Kannada a compulsory language for primary education based on the "Gokak report", popularly known as Gokak Varadhi. He became actively involved in the movement and soon became the force behind the Gokak movement. He led rallies from Belagavi to Bengaluru and gave speeches about the importance of Kannada Gokak agitation. Millions of people gathered for the opportunity to have a glimpse of Rajkumar and listen to his speeches. The power of this movement caused the government to relent and make Kannada a compulsory language of education in Karnataka.

== Awards and honours ==
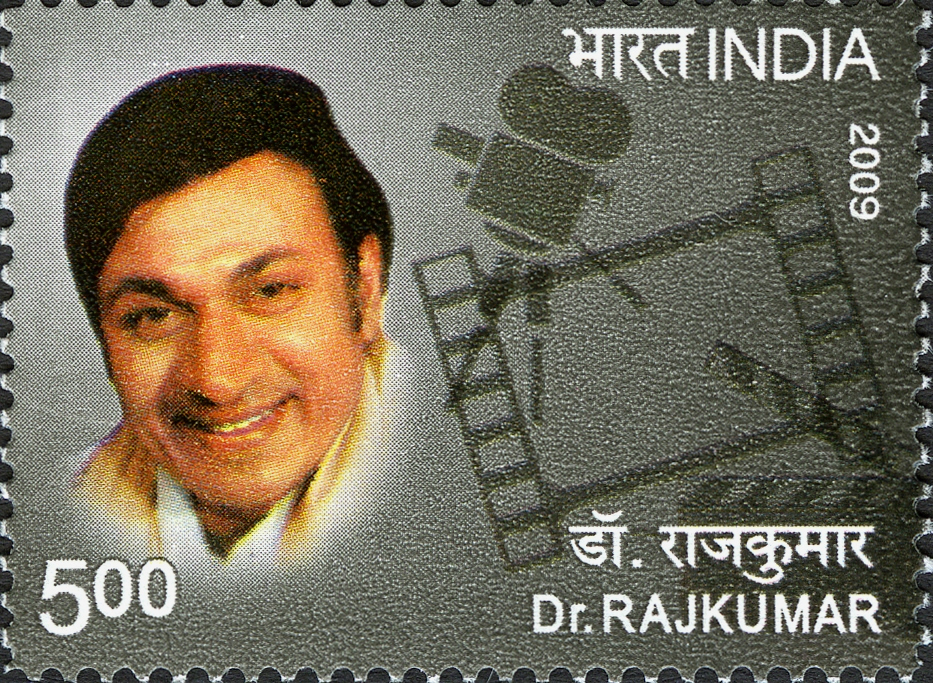
Portrait of Rajkumar on an Indian stamp (2009)

Rajkumar was awarded numerous State, National and International awards. He was a recipient of the Padma Bhushan; an honorary doctorate from Mysore University and also the Karnataka Ratna, the highest civilian honour of the State of Karnataka.

In 1985, he was honoured with the Kentucky Colonel award.

In 1995, he received the Dadasaheb Phalke Award for his outstanding contributions to the Kannada film industry.

In 2011, during the 83rd birth anniversary of Rajkumar, the Chief Minister of Karnataka announced that the state government recommended that he be awarded a Bharat Ratna, the highest civilian award of the country, for his outstanding contributions to the film industry. He was reported to be the first actor whose first movie won the National Award for Best Picture ( Certificate of Merit). He was also the first actor to complete 100 movies in the lead role in Kannada.

=== International recognition ===
- Kentucky Colonel, an honorary order from the governor of Kentucky, United States in 1985 – the only Indian actor to receive the award.
- The British daily newspaper The Guardian praised him for his subtle acting and described him as a humble, modest being who was a symbol of Kannada consciousness.
- The New York-based American newspaper The New York Times described him as "an epitome of good character not just in movies but also in real life".
- The California-based daily newspaper East Bay Times praised him for never having smoked cigarettes on screen and never playing a drunkard after his early days.
- ABC News - the news division of Walt Disney Television – acknowledged him as one of the greatest actors of his time and called him The Gentle Giant of Karnataka.
- The Rome-headquartered global news agency Inter Press Service(IPS) observed that Rajkumar epitomised the breaking away of the Kannada cinema from the older Tamil cinema which then had an overarching influence in the southern India.
- The American daily The Washington Post called him "one of the region's best-loved figures who had millions of fiercely devoted fans".
- The Washington, D.C.–based American media organisation NPR called him "a role model, community leader and an aesthete".
- The Irish daily newspaper The Irish Times called him a veteran matinee idol and a cultural icon beloved by all.
- The Dubai based English daily newspaper Gulf News called him "a polite man, a philanthropist, who led a simple life".
- The British broadcaster BBC called him an Indian film legend who was one of the best-loved figures in southern India.
- The U.S. based multimedia agency Voice of America (VOA) called him one of southern India's most famous actors known for never smoking cigarettes or playing a drunkard on-screen.
- WarnerMedia owned CNN recognised him as one of southern India's most famous film stars.
- The British news publisher The Independent called him one of India's best-loved actors and the biggest star the Kannada film industry has ever produced.
- The San Jose based The Mercury News lauded his unparalleled contribution to Kannada and Kannada film fraternity.
- A biographical book on Rajkumar compiled by Puneeth Rajkumar titled Dr. Rajkumar:The Person Behind The Personality was officially handed over to British Library, London.

=== National level recognition ===
- 1983 – Padma Bhushan
- 1992 – Best Male Playback Singer for the song Naadamaya Ee Lokavella from the movie Jeevana Chaitra – Only Indian actor to receive it for singing.
- 1995 – Dadasaheb Phalke Award – First person to receive it for his work in Kannada movies.
- 2002 – NTR National Award – First Kannada actor to receive it.
- On 1 November 2009, postal stamp bearing the actor's likeness was issued by the Central Government of India – First Kannada actor to receive that honour.
- In April 2013, Forbes India had included Rajkumar's performance in Bangarada Manushya in its list of 25 Greatest Acting Performances of Indian Cinema on the eve of the centenary celebrations of Indian cinema.
- Dr. Rajkumar Samagra Charithre – a two-volume book by film critic D.Rukkoji on the life and achievements of Rajkumar won the Swarna Kamal Award at the 63rd National Film Awards under the National Film Award for Best Book on Cinema category.
- In 2016, the Maharashtra State Government had prescribed the biography of the actor for its class VIII students detailing his achievements and contributions to the Kannada culture under the title Natasarvabhouma.
- On 24 April 2017, Google India dedicated a Google Doodle in his honour. – Second Indian actor to receive that honour.

=== Recognition by the state ===
- Honoured with the title: Nata Saarvabhouma in 1967 from the Government of Karnataka.
- Rajyotsava Prashasti in 1973.
- An honorary doctorate from the Mysore University in 1976.
- Karnataka Ratna in 1992 – First recipient of the award along with Kuvempu.
- He was the first and last recipient of Gubbi Veeranna Award (1993).
- The State Government established Dr. Rajkumar Award in 1993–94 to be given for lifetime achievement towards contributions to Kannada cinema - making him the first Indian actor in whose name a State Government established an award while he was still alive.
- In 1993, there were calls that Mysore Dasara should not be celebrated by the Karnataka State Government that year on account of loss of lives caused by the 1993 Latur earthquake in the neighbouring state of Maharashtra. However, then-CM Veerappa Moily decided to invite Dr. Rajkumar to inaugurate the Dasara with a view to silence his critics opposing the celebrations. This was the first instance of inauguration of Dasara proceedings by a popular public figure - thereby starting a new tradition of State Government officially inviting dignitaries to inaugurate Dasara.
- A 6-kilometre (3.7 mi) road was named Dr. Rajkumar Road on 27 January 1994. The road stretches from the government soap factory and World Trade Center (Orion mall) in Yeshwanthpur to Prasanna theatre, Magadi road in Bangalore.
- The Nadoja Award, an honorary doctorate from Hampi University in 1999.
- He was felicitated by the Karnataka State Government on completion of 50 years in the Kannada film industry for his rich contributions to the celluloid world.
- In 2010, the Karnataka State Government had announced to build a film city in memory of Rajkumar and Vishnuvardhan based on the model of Ramoji Film City.
- The 11.5 km road connecting Nayandahalli Junction and Tumkur Road titled as Dr.Rajkumar Punyabhoomi Raste where it passes through (Kanteerava studio) Raj's Monument.
- In 2017, the Karnataka State Government had prescribed his biography and contributions to Kannada cinema for its Class V students and a mention of his contributions to Kannada culture for its Class VI students.
- A garden depicting sequences from his movies through sculptures had been established at Gotagodi, Haveri.
- In August 2022, on the occasion of 75th Independence Day, flower show themed on the life journey of Rajkumar and his son Puneeth Rajkumar was conducted at Lal Bagh as a tribute to them which included the bust of the actor along with 205 portraits of his films.

=== Filmfare Awards South ===
Rajkumar holds the record of winning eight South Filmfare Awards in the Best Actor category in Kannada cinema.

Below is the list of films for which he received the Best Actor awards:

1. Gandhada Gudi in 1973
2. Mayura in 1975
3. Shankar Guru in 1978
4. Keralida Simha in 1981
5. Shravana Banthu – 1984
6. Ade Kannu – 1985
7. Bhagyada Lakshmi Baramma – 1986
8. Aakasmika in 1993

Total of 8 Filmfare awards in the Best Actor category.

=== Karnataka State Film Awards ===
- Rajkumar has won 11 Karnataka State Film Awards (9 for best actor, 2 for best singer)

Best Actor

- 1967–1968 – Bangaarada Hoovu
- 1970–1971 – Kula Gourava
- 1974–1975 – Bhakta Kumbara
- 1976–1977 – Babruvaahana
- 1981–1982 – Hosa Belaku
- 1982–1983 – Haalu Jenu
- 1988–1989 – Devatha Manushya
- 1992–1993 – Jeevana Chaitra
- 1993–1994 – Odahuttidavaru

Best Singer

- 1993–1994 – Aakasmika – "Huttidare Kannada"
- 1994–1995 – Thayi Illada Thavaru – "Arishina Kumkuma"

=== Other awards and honours ===
- In 2013, a bronze statue of Rajkumar was placed in the replica of Hampi stone chariot at Kurubarahalli Circle in Nandini Layout.
- Vishwa Maanava named by Kannada poet Kuvempu
- ETV Kannadiga of the Year Award in 2003
- In 2020, on the occasion of Karnataka Rajyotsava, gold and silver coins engraved with his face on one side and the Karnataka State symbol Gandaberunda engraved on the other side were released in his memory.

=== Sarthaka Suvarna ===
In July 2005, the government of Karnataka captioned by N. Dharam Singh, the Chief Minister of Karnataka conducted a felicitation ceremony for honouring Rajkumar for his (50 years of) service to Karnataka at Bangalore Palace named Sarthaka Suvarna (Significant Gold). This ceremony was attended by the entire Kannada film industry marking respect and tribute to the legend, and could be called an official celebration of Golden Jubilee of Rajkumar's works and services to the Kannada film industry. A Biography on Rajkumar, written by A.N.Prahlada Rao, was released on the occasion.

== See also ==
- List of kidnappings
- Kannada cinema
