= National Highway 948 (India) =

National highway in India

National Highway 948
- Map of National Highway 948 in red

Route information
- Auxiliary route of NH 48
- Length: 324 km (201 mi)

Major junctions
- North end: NH 48 in Bengaluru
- NH 766 in Kollegal NH 150A in Chamarajanagara NH 181 in Coimbatore
- South end: NH 83 / NH 544 in Coimbatore

Location
- Country: India
- States: Tamil Nadu: 119.7 km (74.4 mi); Karnataka: 204.3 km (126.9 mi)

Highway system
- Roads in India; Expressways; National; State; Asian
← NH 848	→ NH 948A

National Highway 948 (previously designated NH 209) is a highway in India which connects Coimbatore in Tamil Nadu with the city of Bengaluru. It is a spur road of National Highway 48. It passes through Sathyamangalam Wildlife Sanctuary. The road through the wildlife sanctuary is a single carriageway with two lanes, and it is narrow at many places. Wild animals can be spotted in this route. The movement of automobiles are not allowed from 8 P.M to 6 A.M through Dhimbam ghat (Bannari to Karappallam) stretch in this national highway. National Highway 948 passes through Sathyamangalam forests, which were the territory of the dreaded Bandit Veerappan. The alternate route for Night traffic is a 389 kilometres (242 mi) drive via Erode, Mettur Dam, Male Mahadeshwara Hills, Kollegal & then to Bengaluru.

There are many Forest check post and Police check post in this route at both states of Karnataka and Tamilnadu.

== Route ==
Highway number	Source	Destination	Via	Length (km)
948	Bengaluru	Coimbatore	Thalaghattapura, Kaggalipura, Harohalli, Kanakapura, Shivanahalli, Sathanur, Halaguru, Malavalli, Kollegal, Chamrajanagara, Punajanur, Hasanur, Dhimbam ghat, Bannari, Sathyamangalam, Puliampatti, Annur, Kovilpalayam (Sarkar Samakulam)	324

== See also ==
- List of national highways in India
- List of national highways in India by state
