= Sathyamangalam Tiger Reserve =

Tiger reserve in Tamil Nadu, India

- IUCN category IV (habitat/species management area)
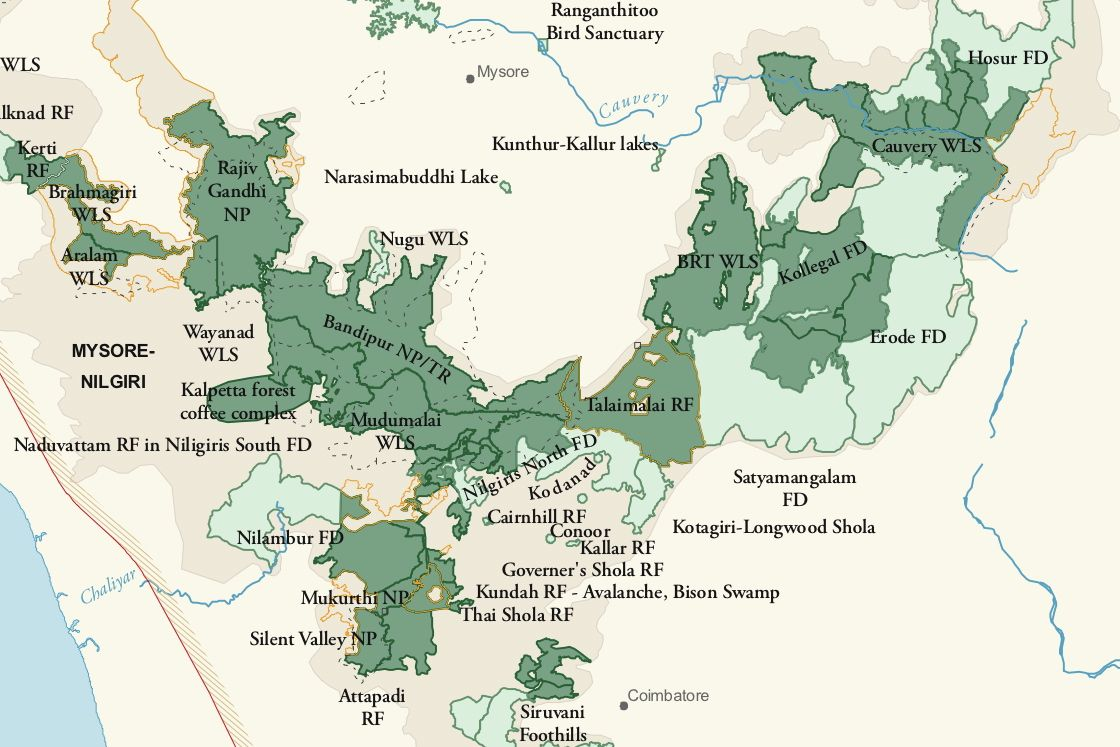
- Map of Nilgiris Biosphere Reserve, showing Sathyamangalam Wildlife Sanctuary

- Location within Tamil Nadu Location within India
- Interactive map of Sathyamangalam Tiger Reserve
- Nearest city: Coimbatore
- Coordinates: 11°38′24″N 77°13′34″E
- Area: 1,408.6 km^{2} (543.9 sq mi)
- Elevation: 1790
- Established: 3 November 2008
- Governing body: Tamil Nadu Forest Department
- Website: http://www.forests.tn.nic.in

Sathyamangalam Tiger Reserve is a protected area and tiger reserve located along the area straddling both the Western Ghats and Eastern Ghats in the Erode district of the Indian state of Tamil Nadu. The Sathyamangalam Forest Division is part of the Bramhagiri-Nilgiris-Eastern Ghats Elephant Reserve notified in 2003. In 2008, part of the Sathyamangalam Forest Division was declared a wildlife sanctuary, which was further enlarged in 2011 to cover a forest area of 1,411.6 km^{2} (545.0 sq mi). It is the largest wildlife sanctuary in Tamil Nadu. In 2013, an area of 1,408.6 km^{2} (543.9 sq mi) of the erstwhile sanctuary was notified as a tiger reserve and it was the fourth tiger reserve established in the state as a part of Project Tiger.

The reserve is a significant ecosystem and a wildlife corridor in the Nilgiri Biosphere Reserve between the Western Ghats and the Eastern Ghats and a genetic link between the five other protected areas which it adjoins, including the Sigur Plateau, Mudumalai and Bandipur National Parks, Billigiriranga Swamy Temple and Cauvery Wildlife Sanctuaries. The reserve covers parts of Talavady, Sathyamangalam and Gobichettipalayam taluks of Erode district in western Tamil Nadu.

The reserve had a tiger population of 80 individuals in 2018 which was 25 in 2011. In 2022, the reserve won the TX2 award by World Wide Fund in collaboration with wildlife conservation agencies for its growth in tiger population.

== History ==
Patches of sandalwood reserves including the Sathyamangalam forests were notified under the Indian Forest Act, 1927. The forests were part of the erstwhile Coimbatore district with a range officer at Sathyamangalam and eight guards. The forest division is currently located in Erode district and forms a part of the Brahmagiri-Nilgiris-Eastern Ghats elephant reserve notified in 2003. Sathyamangalam Forest Division was declared a wildlife sanctuary with effect from 3 November 2008 by the Government of Tamil Nadu as per the Wild Life Protection Act of 1972. In 2008, the Government of Karnataka sent a proposal to declare the contiguous Billigiriranga Swamy Temple Wildlife Sanctuary as a tiger reserve which was subsequently approved in 2010. In a wildlife survey conducted by the Government of Tamil Nadu in 2010, 46 tigers were sighted in the Sathyamangalam forest area. In July 2010, the Minister of State for Environment and Forests of the Government of India requested the Chief Minister of Tamil Nadu to consider the possibility of proposing the Sathyamangalam wildlife sanctuary as a Project Tiger reserve as per the provisions of the Wildlife Protection Act of 1972 as the area is contiguous with the forests of Bandipur and Mudumalai tiger reserves. On 1 April 2010, the Government of Tamil Nadu announced that it would initiate the process to declare the sanctuary as a tiger reserve because of the consistent sighting of tigers in the forest area and that the declaration would strengthen wildlife conservation efforts, as the central government would provide additional financial support for the appointment of additional anti-poaching watchers and for the establishment of anti-poaching camps.

On 10 March 2011, the Principal Chief Conservator of Forests said that the proposal for according tiger reserve status for the Sathyamangalam reserve forests is under consideration. He said that studies using camera traps indicated there could be 19 to 25 tigers in the forests. A 2011 camera trap tiger density study conducted by World Wildlife Fund indicated that the sanctuary is home to at least 25 tigers. In the same year, a DNA based project initiated by the state forest department collected 150 samples of pugmarks from the Sathyamangalam forests and 69 of them were found positive for tigers by tests conducted at the Centre for Cellular and Molecular Biology in Hyderabad. The findings also indicated that the region was home to as many as 30 tigers.

Supported by the reports of tiger sightings, the Tamil Nadu Forest Department submitted a detailed report to the state government supporting the proposal to declare the sanctuary as a tiger reserve and the proposal was taken up for consideration by the Tamil Nadu Council of Ministers in early 2012. On 6 April 2012, the Chief Wildlife Warden said that the proposal to declare Sathyamangalam as a tiger reserve has been sent to the Ministry of Environment and Forests for approval and funding. In March 2013, the Government of India issued an order declaring the Sathyamangalam Wildlife Sanctuary as the fourth tiger reserve in the state, with the other three being Mudumalai, Indira Gandhi National Park and Kalakkad Mundanthurai Tiger Reserve.

== Expanse ==
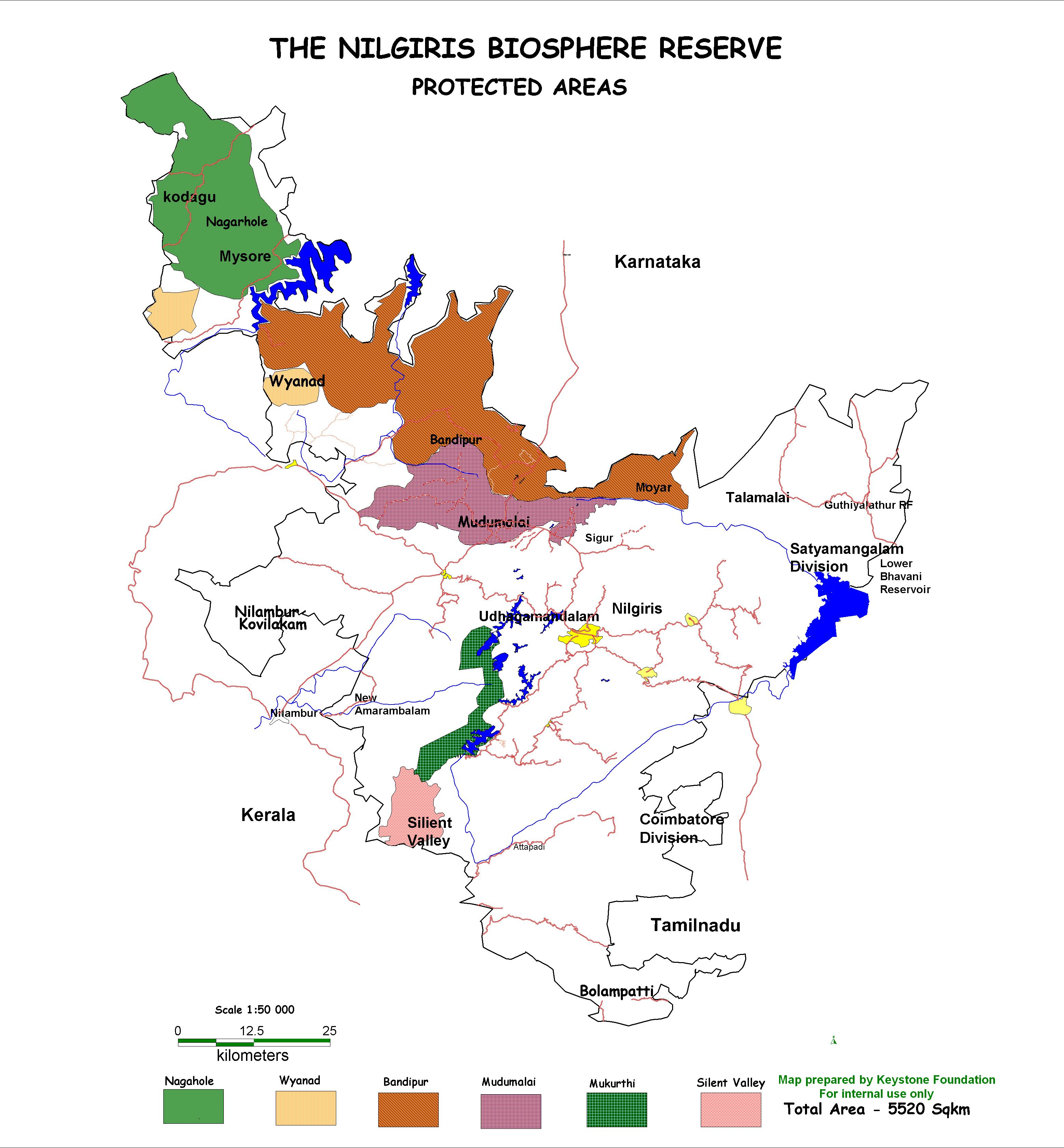
Sathyamangalam Forest Division in Nilgiri Biosphere Reserve

The total area originally declared as a sanctuary was 524.3494 km^{2} (202.4524 sq mi). The boundaries of the sanctuary were the Thalavadi range of Thalamalai forests and Hasanur, T.N.Palayam ranges of Gobichettipalayam taluk of Guthiyalathur forests, contiguous with Billigiriranga Swamy Temple Wildlife Sanctuary in the north and the rivers of Moyar and Bhavani, contiguous with Mudumalai National Park and Sigur Plateau in the south. The eastern boundary is formed by the Bargur reserved forests in Anthiyur taluk and Bandipur National Park in the west. The sanctuary includes the areas of Guthiyalathur reserved forests (299.47 km^{2} (115.63 sq mi)), Guthiyalathur extension (1.62 km^{2} (0.63 sq mi)), Thalamalai reserved forests (210.85 km^{2} (81.41 sq mi)) and Thalamalai extension (12.41 km^{2} (4.79 sq mi)).

In September 2011, the Department of forests increased the sanctuary area by declaring an additional 887.26 km^{2} (342.57 sq mi) in seven reserve forests of Sathyamangalam forest division. The largest chunks of additional area are 487.92 km^{2} (188.39 sq mi) from Guthiyalathur and 319.87 km^{2} (123.50 sq mi) from Thalamalai reserve forests, thus increasing the total sanctuary area to 1,411.6 km^{2} (545.0 sq mi). Of the total area, the core zone comprises 917.27 km^{2} (354.16 sq mi) reserved forests and tourism is allowed in the buffer zone with only forest officials permitted entry into the core zone.

== Flora ==
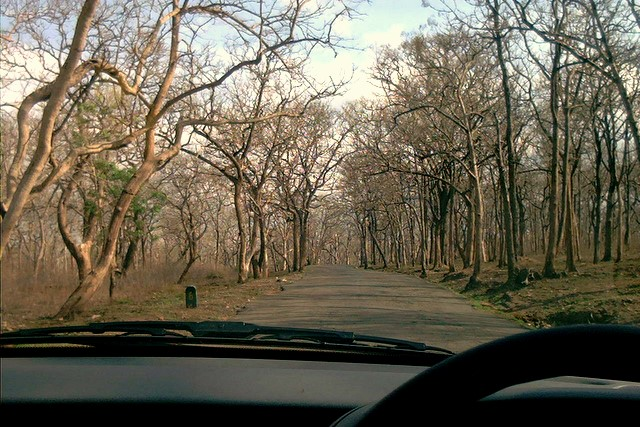
Sathyamangalam forests

The Sathyamangalam forest is mostly tropical dry forest, part of the South Deccan Plateau dry deciduous forests ecoregion. There are five distinct forest types: tropical evergreen (Shola), semi-evergreen, mixed-deciduous, dry deciduous and thorn forests. Evergreen forests are restricted to small patches in a few high altitude hill tops of Sathyamamgalam between 750 m (2,460 ft) and 1,649 m (5,410 ft). These patches are threatened on account of land use changing to hill agriculture and plantation crops, including fruit. Semi-evergreen forests are found at high altitude. Mixed and dry deciduous forests are located on middle altitude slopes and the thorn forests are usually found in the foothills and some times, due degradation of dry deciduous forests, at the middle elevations. About 65% of the forest division is under forest cover. Significant areas of mixed shrubland and grasslands support a large population of herbivore ungulates, the preferred prey of tigers.

== Fauna ==
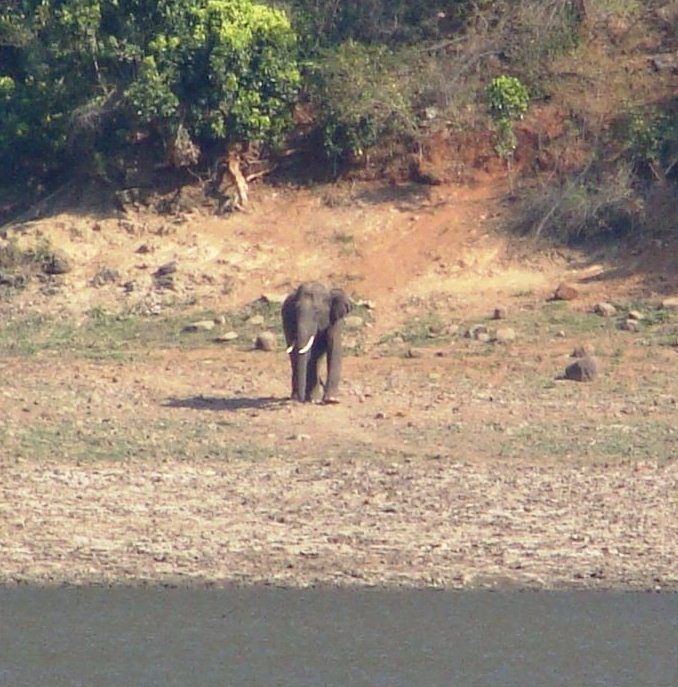
An Asian Elephant at the sanctuary

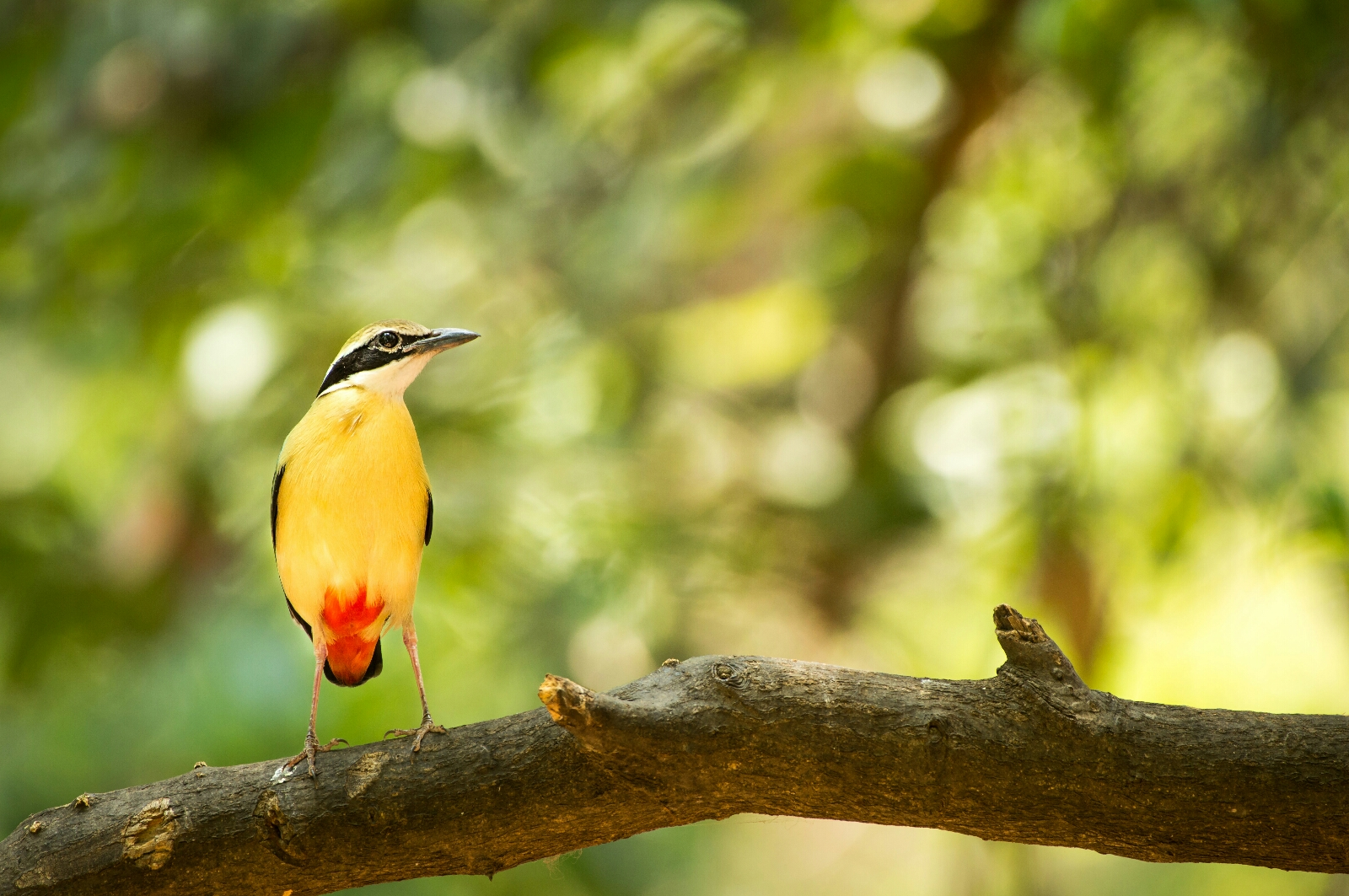
An Indian pitta

The Sathyamangalam forests link the Eastern Ghats and Western Ghats allowing gene flow between diverse fauna populations of the two eco-regions. The 2009 wildlife survey conducted by Government of Tamil Nadu enumerated 12 Bengal tiger, 836 Indian elephants, 779 blackbucks, and 20 leopards.

The 2010 wildlife survey counted 12 Bengal tigers. In December 2011, the Conservator of Forests of Tamil Nadu stated that the sanctuary is home to at least 28 tigers as confirmed by a camera trap study conducted by World Wildlife Fund. In the 2012 national wildlife survey, 25 tigers were recorded. In 2018, 80 tigers were recorded. In 2022, the reserve won the TX2 award by World Wide Fund in collaboration with wildlife conservation agencies for its growth in tiger population.

As per the 2011 census, the Sathyamangalam forests was home to over 850 Indian elephants and is part of a protected area, which consists of the largest Asian elephant population in the world.

=== Birds ===
The reserve hosts many bird species including treepies, bulbuls, Old World babblers, mynahs and crows. In 2010, the first ever bird survey was conducted in the Sathyamangalam forests and a total of 230 species of birds were recorded in the survey.

In 2010, a small population of critically endangered Indian vulture (Gyps indicus) and three other species of vultures were discovered in the Moyar river valley. 20 nests were sighted and the population was estimated to consist up of 40 adults. It was last sighted in the region in the 1970s, and the rediscovery is significant to its conservation. Diclofenac, which caused the decline of vulture population was banned in 2006 and since then, vulture numbers have started to grow back.

== Issues and conservation ==
Conservation of the Sathyamangalam Forest Division is administered by the Tamil Nadu Forest Department governed through Conservator of Forests, STR-Erode. The wildlife sanctuary is part of Project Tiger and Project Elephant conservation programmes run by the Government of India. The sanctuary is listed among the top five places in India for poaching tigers by the international wild life trade monitoring network, TRAFFIC. In February 2016, the National Tiger Conservation Authority announced that drones will be used to monitor tiger population in five tiger reserves including Sathyamangalam.

The reserve also faces issues due to forest fires, uncontrolled grazing of cattle and growth of invasive plant species, damaging the ecosystem. Man-animal conflicts are common especially with elephants and leopards. Elephants raid crop fields and illegal electric fences used to protect crops mortally wound elephants and five elephants were electrocuted in three-month period between January and April 2013. As of 2011, solar powered fencing that give a short and safe electric shock was laid over a length of 239 km (149 mi) to prevent the entry of elephants into agricultural lands. The state forest department also dug trenches at a cost of ₹1.51 crore (US$160,000) to prevent the elephants from entering human habitats. Leopards prey on domestic cattle with as many as 27 goats killed by them in a single month in November 2012. National highway 948 passes through the wildlife sanctuary and wildlife deaths have been reported due to vehicular movement in the highway at night.

== Tribal population ==
Sathyamangalam Tiger Reserve forests are home to indigenous tribal people belonging largely to the Irulas, also known as the Urali, and Soliga communities. In 2011, the Tamil Nadu state forest department officials conducted a study on the cattle and human population in the seven forest settlements and 12 revenue settlements inside the protected area. As of 2013, tribals engage in collecting honey, more than 900 families live in 138 villages within a 5 km (3.1 mi) radius surrounding the park. Tribal people engage in agriculture, grazing of animals and collecting minor forest produce such as honey, tubers, fuel wood and fish. According to the Scheduled Tribes and Other Traditional Forest Dwellers (Recognition of Forest Rights) Act, 2006, the tribals were entitled to use designated land within the park area for agriculture and the title deeds for the same are to be distributed within 2016 after the Supreme Court of India vacated a stay order issued by the Madras High Court prohibiting the same.

The forests were also the home of notorious criminal and bandit Veerapan, who made a living by poaching, smuggling ivory and sandalwood from the forests and selling them on the black market. Veerapan was killed by the Tamil Nadu Police in October 2004.
