= Prakash Raj filmography =

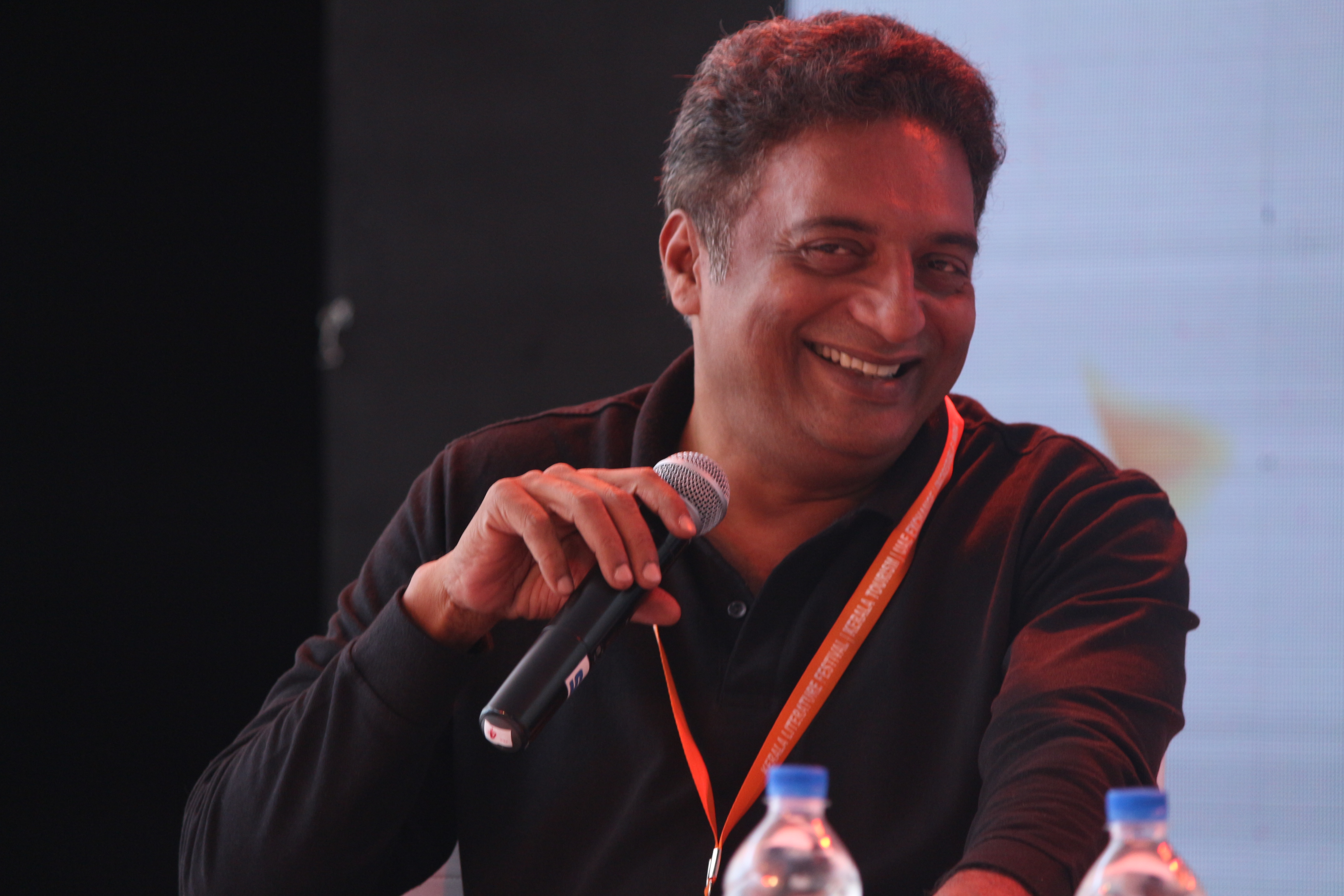
Raj at the 2018 Kerala Literature Festival

Prakash Raj is an Indian actor, film director, producer and television presenter who mainly works in the South Indian film industry. He acted in back-to-back stage shows for ₹300 a month in the initial stages of his career when he joined Kalakshetra, Bengaluru, and he has 2,000 street theatre performances to his credit.

After working in the Kannada television industry and Kannada cinema for a few years, he made his debut in Tamil cinema through Duet (1994) by K. Balachander and has since been a commercially successful film star in Tamil. In remembrance, he named his production company Duet Movies. Prakash Raj's work in various languages like Telugu, Tamil, Kannada, Hindi, Malayalam and English has placed him among the most sought after actors in Indian cinema. He has played a variety of roles, most notably as the antagonist and, of late, as a character actor. Prakash, as an actor has won a National Film Award for Best Supporting Actor in 1998 for Mani Ratnam's Iruvar and a National Film Award for Best Actor in 2009 for his role in Kanchivaram, a Tamil film directed by Priyadarshan, and as a producer has won a National Film Award for Best Feature Film in Kannada for Puttakkana Highway directed by his long-time theatre friend B. Suresha in 2011. Prakash was also the host of Neengalum Vellalam Oru Kodi during the shows second season. He has appeared in 398 films.

== Films ==
Key
†	Denotes films that have not yet been released

=== As actor ===
==== 1988–1999 ====
Year	Title	Role	Language	Notes	Ref.
1988	Mithileya Seetheyaru	Doctor	Kannada		
1990	Muthina Haara	Jaisingh	Kannada		
1990	Ramarajyadalli Rakshasaru		Kannada		
1990	Ramachaari		Kannada		
1990	Challenge	Madhav Rao	Kannada		
1990	Anukoolakkobba Ganda		Kannada		
1991	Keralida Kesari	Mari Veerappan	Kannada		
1991	Kiladi Gandu	Sayyed	Kannada		
1992	Chamatkara	Inspector Rao	Kannada	Cameo	
1992	Mallige Hoove		Kannada		
1993	Harakeya Kuri	Badri	Kannada		
1993	Tropical Heat	Police Inspector	English		
1994	Duet	Actor Sirpy	Tamil		
1994	Nishkarsha	Suresh	Kannada		
1994	Lockup Death	Giri	Kannada		
1994	Nila	Ramesh	Tamil		
1995	Thalaivanin Arulullam	Dev Saravanan	Tamil		
1995	Bombay	Kumar	Tamil		
1995	Sankalpam	Gaddapalugu Chenchu Ramaiah	Telugu		
1995	Pullakuttikaran	Prakash Rao	Tamil		
1995	Aasai	Major Madhavan	Tamil		
1995	Seethanam	Rajasekhar	Tamil		
1996	Kalki	Prakash	Tamil	Tamil Nadu State Film Award for Best Villain	
1996	The Prince	Surya Das	Malayalam		
1996	Priyam	Dharma	Tamil		
1996	Subash	Arumugasamy	Tamil		
1996	Sahanam	K.N.Rao	Telugu		
1996	Gunshot	Ali Zaffar Khan	Telugu	25th Film	
1996	Vinodam	Prakash	Telugu		
1996	Vasantha Kavya		Kannada		
1996	Janani		Kannada		
1996	Indraprastham	Mohan George	Malayalam		
1996	Pavithra Bandham	Suriya	Telugu		
1996	Vishwanath	Michael	Tamil		
1996	Poomani	Thangamani	Tamil		
1996	Alexander	Ashok	Tamil		
1997	Suswagatham	Vasudeva Rao	Telugu		
1997	Hitler	Prakash Raj	Telugu		
1997	Iruvar	Tamilzhchelvan	Tamil	National Film Award for Best Supporting Actor	
1997	Minsara Kanavu	Jaipal	Tamil		
1997	Mommaga		Kannada		
1997	Aravindhan	Krishnan Kumar	Tamil		
1997	Oru Yathramozhi	Satya	Malayalam		
1997	Raasi	Melapatty Ramasamy's son	Tamil		
1997	Dhinamum Ennai Gavani	Rolex	Tamil		
1997	V.I.P.	Santhosh's brother	Tamil	Guest appearance	
1997	Nandhini	Prakash	Tamil		
1997	Nagamandala	Appanna	Kannada		
1997	Nerrukku Ner	Kandaswamy	Tamil		
1997	Paththini	Eeswar	Tamil		
1997	Vidukathai	Neelakandan	Tamil		
1998	Anthapuram	Narasimha	Telugu	National Film Award for Best Actor (Special Jury)	
1998	Santhosham	Nadesan	Tamil	50th Film	
1998	Kavalai Padathe Sagodhara		Tamil		
1998	Swarnamukhi	Akash	Tamil		
1998	Choodalani Vundi	Mahendra	Telugu		
1998	Yaare Neenu Cheluve	Jeetu	Kannada		
1998	Sandhippoma	Vishwa's father	Tamil		
1998	Senthooram	Muthu Manikkam	Tamil		
1998	Sollamale	Dr. Surya Prakash	Tamil		
1998	Gurupaarvai	Gurumurthy	Tamil		
1998	Kanasalu Neene Manasalu Neene	Lankesh	Kannada		
1998	Shanti Shanti Shanti	Ganga Prasad	Kannada		
1998	Preethsod Thappa	Chandana's father	Kannada		
1998	Manasichi Choodu	Politician	Telugu		
1999	Sneham Kosam	Peddabbayi	Telugu		
1999	En Swaasa Kaatrae	Guru	Tamil		
1999	Padayappa	IG Subramaniam	Tamil	Cameo	
1999	Rajasthan	Terrorist	Tamil		
1999	Veedu Samanyudu Kaadu	Sivaram	Telugu		
1999	Rajakumarudu	Dhanunjay	Telugu		
1999	Seenu	Dr. Surya Prakash	Telugu		
1999	Anthapuram	Narashima	Tamil		
1999	P	Venkata Narayana	Telugu		
1999	Preminchedi Endukamma	Jagan	Telugu		
1999	Samudram	Nooka Raju	Telugu		
1999	Z	Prakash	Kannada		
1999	Aavide Syamala		Telugu		

==== 2000–2009 ====
Year	Title	Role	Language	Notes
2000	Sammakka Sarakka	Bose	Telugu	75th Film
2000	Kshemamga Velli Labhamga Randi	Master	Telugu	
2000	Sanchalanam		Telugu	
2000	Appu	Maharani	Tamil	
2000	Badri	Nanda	Telugu	
2000	Manoharam	Srinivasa Murthy	Telugu	
2000	Real Story	Veeraiya	Telugu	
2000	Sardukupodaam Randi	Problem Paramkusam	Telugu	
2000	Adavi Chukka		Telugu	
2000	Chamundi		Kannada	
2000	Moodu Mukkalaata	Paramahamsa	Telugu	
2000	Chinna Chinna Kannile	Sabesan	Tamil	
2000	Azad	Salim	Telugu	
2000	Vaanavil	Prakash	Tamil	Tamil Nadu State Film Award for Best Villain
2000	Thank You Subba Rao	GK	Telugu	
2000	Bachi	Tatineni Koteswara Rao	Telugu	
2000	Chiru Navvutho	Pratap	Telugu	
2000	Tirumala Tirupati Venkatesa		Telugu	Cameo
2001	Mrugaraju	Valmiki Dora	Telugu	
2001	Vanchinathan	Chidambaram	Tamil	
2001	Maa Aavida Meeda Ottu Mee Aavida Chala Manchidi	GV	Telugu	
2001	Murari	Zamindar	Telugu	Cameo
2001	Usire	Rudre Gowda	Kannada	
2001	Rishi	Inspector Shakthivel	Tamil	
2001	Little John	Kaala Bhairavan / Kala Bhairava	Tamil / Hindi / English	
2001	Dosth	ACP Neelakanda Bhramachari	Tamil	100th Film
2001	Ammai Kosam	Anjali's father	Telugu	
2001	Premakke Sai		Kannada	
2001	Bhalevadivi Basu	Benerjee	Telugu	
2001	Nuvvu Naaku Nachav	Murthy	Telugu	
2001	Alli Thandha Vaanam	Prakash	Tamil	
2002	Premaku Swagatam	Mahendra	Telugu	
2002	Kannathil Muthamittal	Dr. Herold Vikramesinghe	Tamil	ITFA Best Supporting Actor Award
2002	Ekangi		Kannada	
2002	Dhaya	Dhaya	Tamil	National Film Award for Best Actor (Special Jury)
2002	Hai	Priya's father	Telugu	
2002	Adrustam	Police Officer	Telugu	
2002	Indra	Chenna Kesava Reddy	Telugu	
2002	Idiot	Vipra Narayana	Telugu	
2002	Shakti – The Power	Sharpshooter	Hindi	
2002	Atithi	Ali Abdul Khan	Kannada	
2002	Album	Jamun fruit seller	Tamil	Cameo
2002	Nuvve Nuvve	Vishwanath	Telugu	Filmfare Award for Best Telugu Supporting Actor
2002	Bobby	Yadagiri	Telugu	
2002	Kadhal Azhivathillai	Fingerprint Expert	Tamil	
2002	Khadgam	Amjad Khan	Telugu	Nandi Award for Best Supporting Actor
2002	I Love You Da	Siddharth	Tamil	
2002	Rifles	Narasimha Varma	Telugu	
2003	Chokka Thangam	Sundaram	Tamil	Nominated, Filmfare Best Tamil Supporting Actor Award
2003	Okkadu	Obul Reddy	Telugu	Santosham Best Villain Award
2003	Juniors	Principal	Telugu	
2003	Gangotri	Neelakantha Naidu	Telugu	125th Film; Nandi Award for Best Villain
2003	Dil	Gowri Shankar	Telugu	
2003	Kadhal Sadugudu	Chidambaram	Tamil	
2003	Sanchalanam		Telugu	
2003	Amma Nanna O Tamila Ammayi	Raghuveer	Telugu	Nandi Award for Best Character Actor
2003	Nijam	A.C.P Raja Narendra	Telugu	
2003	Simhachalam	Dora Swamy Raju	Telugu	
2003	Charminar	Surendra Babu	Telugu	
2003	Tagore	Suryam	Telugu	Filmfare Award for Best Telugu Supporting Actor
2003	Naam	Irfan Pathan Khan	Tamil	
2003	Preethi Prema Pranaya	Dr. Ashok	Kannada	
2003	Sivamani	Dattu	Telugu	
2004	Varsham	Ranga Rao	Telugu	
2004	Lakshmi Narasimha	Dharma Bhiksham	Telugu	
2004	Athade Oka Sainyam	Prakash Rao	Telugu	
2004	Khakee	ACP Shrikant Naidu	Hindi	
2004	Thekkekkara Superfast	Jonnykutty	Malayalam	Malayalam debut film 1995 start released on 2004
2004	Seenu Vasanthi Lakshmi	Appala Naidu	Telugu	
2004	Ghilli	Muthu Pandi	Tamil	Filmfare Award for Best Tamil Villain
2004	Samba	Pasupathi	Telugu	
2004	Koduku	Narayanan	Telugu	
2004	Yagnam	Inspector Pratap Reddy	Telugu	
2004	Sri Anjaneyam	Anji's father	Telugu	
2004	Bimba	Raj	Kannada	
2004	Shart: The Challenge	Nandu	Hindi	150th Film
2004	Naa Autograph	Prakash Kumar	Telugu	
2004	Intlo Srimathi Veedhilo Kumari	Sundara Murthy	Telugu	
2004	Vasool Raja MBBS	Vishwanathan	Tamil	
2004	Azhagiya Theeye	Aravind	Tamil	
2004	Arjun	Bala	Telugu	
2004	Giri	Suryaprakash	Tamil	
2004	M. Kumaran Son Of Mahalakshmi	Easwar	Tamil	
2004	Konchem Touchlo Vunte Cheputanu	JK	Telugu	
2004	Vidyarthi		Telugu	
2004	Mass	Durga Prasad	Telugu	
2005	Ayya	Karuppusamy	Tamil	
2005	Nuvvostanante Nenoddantana	Prakash	Telugu	
2005	Dhana 51		Telugu	
2005	Sankranthi	Govardhan Choudary	Telugu	
2005	Chakram	Chakram's father	Telugu	
2005	Bunny	Somaraju	Telugu	
2005	Subhash Chandra Bose	Venkatratnam	Telugu	
2005	Athanokkade	Ram's father	Telugu	
2005	Bhadra	Surendra	Telugu	
2005	Amudhae	Victor	Tamil	
2005	Arinthum Ariyamalum	Aadhi Narayanan	Tamil	
2005	Andarivaadu	Veerendra (Eeru Babu)	Telugu	
2005	Anniyan	DCP Prabhakar	Tamil	Tamil Nadu State Film Award for Best Villain
2005	Athadu	CBI Officer Anjaneya Prasad	Telugu	
2005	Ponniyin Selvan	Guru	Tamil	175th Film
2005	Pandipada	Pandidurai	Malayalam	
2005	Political Rowdy	Pandu	Telugu	
2005	Aadum Koothu	Zamindar	Tamil	direct-to-television
2005	Bhageeratha	Venkata Ratnam	Telugu	
2005	Sivakasi	Udayappa	Tamil	Filmfare Award for Best Tamil Villain
2006	Paramasivan	Nandhakumar	Tamil	
2006	Aathi	Aadhi's father	Tamil	
2006	Saravana	Soundarapandi	Tamil	
2006	Idhaya Thirudan	Mayilravanan	Tamil	
2006	Suyetchai MLA	Ilampirai	Tamil	
2006	Ajay	Vijay	Kannada	
2006	Illalu Priyurala	Veer Singh	Telugu	
2006	Pokiri	Ali Bhai	Telugu	
2006	Veerabhadra	Pothuraju	Telugu	
2006	Thalainagaram	ACP Gopinath	Tamil	
2006	Parijatham	Santhosh	Tamil	
2006	Vikramarkudu	DGP	Telugu	Cameo
2006	Ashok	Ashok's father	Telugu	
2006	Bommarillu	Aravind	Telugu	Nandi Award for Best Supporting Actor
2006	Aran	Colonel	Tamil	
2006	Vettaiyaadu Vilaiyaadu	Arokiyaraj	Tamil	
2006	Perarasu	Elakkyam	Tamil	
2006	Stalin	Muddu Krishnayya	Telugu	
2006	Vathiyar	Easwara Pandian	Tamil	
2006	Sainikudu	Mondi Naani	Telugu	200th Film
2006	Khatarnak	Commissioner	Telugu	
2006	Thiruvilaiyaadal Aarambam	Guru	Tamil	
2006	Rakhi	Judge	Telugu	Cameo
2006	Poi	Vidhi	Tamil	
2007	Pokkiri	Ali Bhai	Tamil	Nominated, Vijay Award for Best Villain
2007	Lee	Puthiran	Tamil	
2007	Mozhi	Vijayakumar	Tamil	Vijay Award for Best Supporting Actor
2007	Viyabari	Kasi Viswanathan	Tamil	Cameo
2007	Aadivaram Adavallaku Selavu		Telugu	Cameo
2007	Jagadam	Police Commissioner	Telugu	Cameo
2007	Munna	Kakha	Telugu	
2007	Veerappu	Vedhukannu	Tamil	
2007	Aarya	Kasi	Tamil	
2007	Chirutha	Karthikeya	Telugu	
2007	Kanna	Raghunath	Tamil	
2008	Bheemaa	Chinna	Tamil	
2008	Velli Thirai	Kannaiya	Tamil	
2008	Jalsa	Indu & Bhagyamati's father	Telugu	
2008	Santosh Subramaniam	Subramaniam	Tamil	
2008	Arai En 305-il Kadavul	Kadavul	Tamil	
2008	Kantri	Pothu Raju alias PR	Telugu	
2008	Parugu	Neelakanta	Telugu	
2008	Saroja	Vishwanath	Tamil	
2008	Rainbow	Doctor	Telugu	
2008	Alibhabha	Subramaniam	Tamil	225th Film
2008	Pandhayam	Masanam	Tamil	
2008	Kotha Bangaru Lokam	Balu's father	Telugu	Nominated, Filmfare Award for Best Telugu Supporting Actor
2008	Kanchivaram	Vengadam	Tamil	National Film Award for Best Actor; Filmfare Best Tamil Actor Award (2009); Vijay Award for Best Actor
2008	Abhiyum Naanum	Raghuram	Tamil	Tamil Nadu State Film Award for Best Character Artiste (Male); Nominated, Filmfare Best Tamil Supporting Actor Award partially reshot in Telugu as Aakasamantha; Nominated, Filmfare Award for Best Supporting Actor – Telugu
2008	Panchamirtham	Raavana	Tamil	
2009	Villu	J. D.	Tamil	Tamil Nadu State Film Award for Best Villain
2009	Konchem Ishtam Konchem Kashtam	Prakash	Telugu	
2009	Thoranai	Thamizharasu	Tamil	
2009	Pistha	Suryaprakash	Telugu	
2009	Malai Malai	Essaki	Tamil	
2009	Anjaneyulu	Jai Prakash	Telugu	Cameo
2009	Josh	Principal	Telugu	
2009	Wanted	Gani Bhai	Hindi	
2009	Solla Solla Inikkum	Bhadri Narayanan	Tamil	
2009	Mathiya Chennai		Tamil	Cameo
2009	Katha	Viren	Telugu	

==== 2010–2019 ====
Year	Title	Role	Language	Notes
2010	Janani		Kannada	
2010	Naanu Nanna Kanasu	Raj Uthappa	Kannada	Also director
2010	Singam	Mayil Vaaganam	Tamil	
2010	Theeradha Vilaiyattu Pillai	Jyoti's brother	Tamil	
2010	Hoo	Michael	Kannada	
2010	Kadhalagi	Ananthakrishnan (AK)	Tamil	
2010	Golimaar	DGP	Telugu	
2010	Brindaavanam	Bhanu Prasad	Telugu	
2010	Khaleja	GK	Telugu	
2010	Anwar	Stalin Manimaran	Malayalam	
2010	Elektra	Abraham and Isaac	Malayalam	250th Film; Dual role
2010	Collector Gari Bharya	Gautham	Telugu	
2010	Magizhchi	Moses	Tamil	Cameo
2010	Orange	Abhishek Verma	Telugu	
2010	Chutti Chathan	The Cruel Magician	Tamil	
2011	Mirapakaay	Kittu	Telugu	
2011	Payanam	Vishwanath	Tamil	
2011	Gaganam	Vishwanath	Telugu	
2011	Vastadu Naa Raju	Narasimha	Telugu	
2011	Wanted	Basava Reddy	Telugu	
2011	Dongala Mutha	Munna Bhai	Telugu	
2011	Ponnar Shankar	Manthiappan	Tamil	
2011	Ko	Yogeswaran	Tamil	
2011	Mr. Perfect	Dubey, Maggie's Father	Telugu	
2011	Vaanam	Rahimuddin Qureshi	Tamil	
2011	Dhool	Nanda	Kannada	
2011	Engeyum Kaadhal	Himself	Tamil	Cameo
2011	Puttakkana Highway	Shani Krishna	Kannada	
2011	Rajadhani	Ajay	Kannada	
2011	Badrinaadh	Bheeshmanarayana	Telugu	
2011	Pillaiyar Theru Kadaisi Veedu	Doctor	Tamil	Cameo
2011	Bbuddah... Hoga Terra Baap	Kabir Bhai	Hindi	
2011	Venghai	Rajalingam	Tamil	
2011	Singham	Jaikanth Shikre	Hindi	
2011	Rowthiram	Shiva's grandfather	Tamil	Cameo
2011	Mr. Rascal		Telugu	
2011	Dookudu	Shankar Narayana	Telugu	275th Film; SIIMA Award for Best Actor in a Supporting Role
2011	Oosaravelli	Ajju Bhai	Telugu	
2011	Solo	Raghupathi Naidu	Telugu	
2012	Prarthane	Sahukar Thimmappa	Kannada	
2012	Businessman	Jaidev	Telugu	
2012	Bodyguard	Varadarajula Naidu	Telugu	
2012	Dhoni	Subramaniam	Telugu	Also director
2012	Saguni	R. K. Boopathi	Tamil	
2012	Devudu Chesina Manushulu	Prakash Raj	Telugu	
2012	Julayi	—N/a	Telugu	Voiceover
2012	Cameraman Gangatho Rambabu	Rana Prathap Naidu	Telugu	
2012	Dhamarukam	Lord Shiva / Sambayya	Telugu	
2012	Dabangg 2	Thakur Bachcha Singh	Hindi	
2013	Seethamma Vakitlo Sirimalle Chettu	Relangi Mavayya	Telugu	
2013	Mumbai Mirror	Shetty	Hindi	
2013	Ongole Githa	Adikeshavulu	Telugu	
2013	Chennaiyil Oru Naal	Gautham Krishna	Tamil	
2013	Gouravam	Pasupathi	Tamil	
2013	Gouravam	Pasupathi	Telugu	
2013	Thillu Mullu	Siva Gurunathan	Tamil	
2013	Balupu	Nanaji / Mohan Rao	Telugu	
2013	Thulli Vilayadu	Singamuthu	Tamil	
2013	Policegiri	Nagori Subramaniam	Hindi	
2013	Bhaag Milkha Bhaag	Veerapandian	Hindi	
2013	Zanjeer	Rudra Pratap Teja	Hindi	
2013	Thoofan	Rudra Pratap Teja	Telugu	
2013	Rajjo	Handa Bhau	Hindi	300th Film325
2013	Singh Saab the Great	Bhoodev Singh	Hindi	
2014	Heart Attack	Cameo	Telugu	
2014	Crazy Star		Kannada	
2014	Race Gurram	Bheem Prakash	Telugu	
2014	Heropanti	Surat Singh Chaudhary	Hindi	
2014	Un Samayal Arayil	Kalidasan	Tamil	Also director
2014	Ulavacharu Biriyani	Kalidasu	Telugu	Also director
2014	Oggarane	Kalidasa	Kannada	Also director
2014	Alludu Seenu	Bhai & Narasimha	Telugu	
2014	Pilla Nuvvu Leni Jeevitham	Prabhakar	Telugu	
2014	Entertainment	Karan	Hindi	
2014	Kathai Thiraikathai Vasanam Iyakkam		Tamil	Cameo
2014	Govindudu Andarivadele	Balaraju	Telugu	
2014	Power	A. K. Mishra	Telugu	
2014	Mukunda	Jaya Prakash	Telugu	
2015	Temper	Waltair Vasu	Telugu	
2015	S/O Satyamurthy	Satyamurthy	Telugu	Extended Cameo
2015	Pulan Visaranai 2	Advocate	Tamil	
2015	JK Enum Nanbanin Vaazhkai	Rudhratchagan	Tamil	
2015	O Kadhal Kanmani	Ganapathy	Tamil	
2015	Lion	CM Bharadwaja	Telugu	
2015	Ranna	Sharat Chandra	Kannada	
2015	Vinavayya Ramayya		Telugu	
2015	Rudhramadevi	Shiva Devaiah	Telugu	
2015	Mr. Airavata	Prathap Khale	Kannada	
2015	Thoonga Vanam	Vittal Rao	Tamil	
2015	Cheekati Rajyam	Vittal Rao	Telugu	
2015	Inji Iduppazhagi	Satyanand	Tamil	325th Film
2015	Size Zero	Satyanand	Telugu	
2015	Boologam	Deepak	Tamil	
2016	Bangalore Naatkal	Francis	Tamil	
2016	Priyanka	ACP Satya Nadig	Kannada	
2016	Speedunnodu	Veerabhadrappa	Telugu	
2016	Devara Nadalli	Kanitkar	Kannada	
2016	CandyFlip	Jojo	English / Hindi	
2016	Shourya	Krishna	Telugu	
2016	Oopiri	Prasad Rao	Telugu	
2016	Thozha	Prasad	Tamil	
2016	Attack	Guru Raj	Telugu	
2016	Manithan	Adisheshan	Tamil	
2016	Ko 2	Yogeeswaran	Tamil	
2016	Rajadhi Raja	Rudhraksha	Telugu	
2016	Srirastu Subhamastu	Krishna Mohan	Telugu	
2016	Kotigobba 2	Sathya's father	Kannada	
2016	Mudinja Ivana Pudi	Sathyam's father	Tamil	
2016	Idolle Ramayana	Bhujangaiah	Kannada	
2016	Mana Oori Ramayanam	Bhujangaiah	Telugu	
2016	Kadavul Irukaan Kumaru	Manimaran	Tamil	
2016	Naanu Mattu Varalakshmi	Trainer	Kannada	
2017	Shatamanam Bhavati	Raghavaraju	Telugu	
2017	Dwarka	Chief Minister	Telugu	
2017	Yaakkai	Sagayam	Tamil	
2017	Raajakumara	Jagannath	Kannada	
2017	Achayans	Commissioner Karthik Kathiresan	Malayalam	350th Film
2017	Aaradugula Bullet	Nithyanand	Telugu	
2017	Vanamagan	Rajashekar	Tamil	
2017	Nakshatram	Parasuramaiah IPS	Telugu	
2017	Ungarala Rambabu	Ranga Nayar	Telugu	
2017	Golmaal Again	Vasu Reddy	Hindi	
2017	Raja The Great	SP Prakash	Telugu	
2017	Gowdru Hotel	Rishi's grandfather	Kannada	
2017	Richie	Father A.K. Sagayam	Tamil	
2017	Velaikkaran	Kasi	Tamil	
2017	Kalavadiya Pozhudugal	Soundarrajan	Tamil	
2018	Jai Simha	Master	Telugu	
2018	Prema Baraha	Army man's father	Kannada	
2018	Sollividava	Army man's father	Tamil	
2018	Rangasthalam	MLA Dakshina Murthy	Telugu	
2018	Seizer	Bhupathi	Kannada	Nominated – Filmibeat Award for Best Villain – Kannada
2018	Bharat Ane Nenu	Varadarajulu	Telugu	
2018	Mahanati	Aluri Chakrapani	Telugu	
2018	Sometimes	Krishnamoorthy	Tamil	direct-to-video
2018	Traffic Ramasamy	Police Officer	Tamil	
2018	Goodachari	Satya	Telugu	
2018	Summer Holidays		English; Kannada	
2018	Srinivasa Kalyanam	R.K.	Telugu	
2018	60 Vayadu Maaniram	Govindarajan	Tamil	
2018	Chekka Chivantha Vaanam	Senapathi	Tamil	
2018	Hello Guru Prema Kosame	Viswanath	Telugu	
2018	Sei	ACP Suryanarayana	Tamil	
2018	Odiyan	Ravunni	Malayalam	375th Film
2019	N. T. R.	Nagi Reddy	Telugu	
2019	F2: Fun and Frustration	Dora Swamy Naidu	Telugu	
2019	9	Dr. Iniyath Khan	Malayalam	
2019	Dev	Ramalingam	Tamil	
2019	Athiran	Doctor	Malayalam	
2019	Maharshi	K. Satyanarayana	Telugu	Cameo
2019	1st Rank Raju	CEO Parthasarathy	Telugu	
2019	Asuran	Venugopal Seshadri	Tamil	
2019	Azhiyatha Kolangal 2	Gowri Shankar	Tamil	
2019	Venky Mama	Brigadier Vijay Prakash	Telugu	
2019	Ruler	Veerandranath Tagore	Telugu	

==== 2020–present ====
List of Prakash Raj film credits from 2020 to present
Year	Title	Role	Language	Notes
2020	Sarileru Neekevvaru	MLA Yeddula Nagendra	Telugu	
2020	Mayabazar 2016	ACP Ashok	Kannada	
2021	Alludu Adhurs	Jaypal Reddy	Telugu	
2021	Yuvarathnaa	Guru Dev Deshmukh	Kannada	
2021	Vakeel Saab	Nanda Gopal	Telugu	
2021	Jai Bhim	IG Perumalsamy	Tamil	Released on Amazon Prime Video
2021	Annaatthe	Nattadurai	Tamil	Extended Cameo
2021	Enemy	Paarirajan	Tamil	
2022	Clap	Kathir's / Vishnu's father	Tamil; Telugu	Released on SonyLIV
2022	Pada	Chief Secretary N. Rajasekharan	Malayalam	
2022	Attack: Part 1	V K Subramaniam	Hindi	
2022	K.G.F: Chapter 2	Vijayendra Ingalagi	Kannada	
2022	Shekar	Advocate	Telugu	400th Film; Cameo
2022	Major	Unnikrishnan	Telugu; Hindi	Bilingual film
2022	Rashtra Kavach Om	Murthy	Hindi	
2022	Bimbisara	Vishwanandan Varma	Telugu	
2022	Sita Ramam	Brigadier Y. K. Joshi	Telugu	
2022	Poikkal Kuthirai	Kathiravan's father	Tamil	
2022	Viruman	Muniyandi	Tamil	
2022	Thiruchitrambalam	Inspector Neelakandan	Tamil	
2022	Ponniyin Selvan: I	Sundara Chola	Tamil	
2022	Salaam Venky	Anupam Bhatnagar	Hindi	
2022	Varaal	Kerala CM Achuthan Nair	Malayalam	
2023	Varisu	Jayaprakash	Tamil	
2023	Waltair Veerayya	Michael Caesar	Telugu	
2023	Rangamarthanda	Raghava Rao	Telugu	
2023	Shaakuntalam	Sarangi	Telugu	
2023	Ponniyin Selvan: II	Sundara Chola	Tamil	
2023	Kunjamminis Hospital	Dr. Chacko	Malayalam	
2024	Guntur Kaaram	Vyra Venkata Swamy	Telugu	
2024	Satyabhama	Joseph Raj IPS	Telugu	
2024	Purushothamudu	Raghu Ram	Telugu	
2024	Raayan	Commissioner Sargunam Prasad	Tamil	
2024	Utsavam	Abhimanyu Narayana	Telugu	
2024	Devara: Part 1	Singappa	Telugu	
2024	Bagheera	Guru	Kannada	
2024	Viduthalai Part 2	PR	Tamil	Cameo appearance; Deleted scene
2025	Jack	Manoj	Telugu	
2025	Retro	Dharman	Tamil	
2025	They Call Him OG	Satyanarayana Roy Nandan "Satya Dada"	Telugu	
2025	Tere Ishk Mein	Raghav Gurukkal	Hindi	
2025	Champion	Sardar Vallabhbhai Patel	Telugu	
2026	Seetha Payanam	Anjaneyulu	Telugu	
2026	Veera Kambula		Kannada; Tulu	Bilingual film
2026	S Saraswathi	Ramanujam	Telugu	
2026	Kaalidas 2	Advocate Natraj	Tamil	
2026	Dacoit: A Love Story	Solomon	Telugu; Hindi	Bilingual film
2026	Jana Nayagan	Roja Rangaswamy	Tamil	
2026	Drishyam: The Conclusion	Indrajith Shetty	Hindi	
2026	G2 †	Satya	Telugu	Filming
2027	Varanasi †	TBA	Telugu	Filming
TBA	Father †	Raj Mohan	Kannada	Filming
TBA	Miracle †	Rudra Venugopal	Tamil	Filming
TBA	Tatvamasi †	TBA	Telugu	Cameo Appearance; Filming

=== Television ===
Year	Title	Role	Language	Network	Notes
1995	Guddada Bhootha		Kannada	DD Chandana	
1995	Kaialavu Manasu	Gururangan	Tamil	Sun TV	
1995	Chinna Chinna Aasaigal - Judgement		Tamil	Sun TV	Acted in the story "Judgement"
2003	Sahana		Tamil	Jaya TV	
2013	Neengalum Vellalam Oru Kodi	Host	Tamil	Star Vijay	
2020	Paava Kadhaigal	Janakiraman	Tamil	Netflix	Anthology film
2020	Shootout at Alair	DSP Suryanarayana	Telugu	ZEE5	
2021	Navarasa	Sivaraman	Tamil	Netflix	Anthology film
2022	Anantham	Venkatesan	Tamil	ZEE5	
2022	Mukhbir - The Story of a Spy	S. K. S. Moorthy	Hindi	ZEE5	
2024	Ekam	Keshav Mama	Kannada	ekamtheseries.com	
2025	Special Ops	Subramanyam	Hindi	Hotstar	

=== As voice actor ===
Film title	Actor	Role	Dub language	Original language	Original year release	Dub year release	Notes
Raasaiyya	Hemant Ravan	Groom	Tamil	Tamil	1995		
Dil Se..	Piyush Mishra	Arun Kashyap CBI officer	Tamil	Hindi	1998		The Tamil dub was titled: Uyire.
Apoorva	Himself (photo presence)	Voice role	Kannada	Kannada	2016		
Vettaiyan	Amitabh Bachchan	Justice Dr. Sathyadev Bramhadutt Pande	Tamil	Tamil	2024		Initial trailer was released with Prakash Raj's voice for Bachchan. Later, the voice was enhanced with AI to match Bachchan's voice.

=== As producer and director ===
Year	Title	Language	Producer	Director	Notes
2002	Dhaya	Tamil	Yes	No	
2003	Naam	Tamil	Yes	No	
2004	Azhagiya Theeye	Tamil	Yes	No	
2005	Kanda Naal Mudhal	Tamil	Yes	No	
2006	Poi	Tamil	Yes	No	
2007	Mozhi	Tamil	Yes	No	
2008	Velli Thirai	Tamil	Yes	No	
2008	Abhiyum Naanum	Tamil	Yes	No	
2010	Inidhu Inidhu	Tamil	Yes	No	
2010	Naanu Nanna Kanasu	Kannada	Yes	Yes	Directorial Debut
2011	Payanam	Tamil / Telugu	Yes	No	
2011	Puttakkana Highway	Kannada	Yes	No	National Award for Best Regional Film of the year Bengaluru International Film Festival Award
2012	Mayilu	Tamil	Yes	No	
2012	Dhoni	Tamil / Telugu	Yes	Yes	
2013	Gouravam	Tamil / Telugu	Yes	No	
2014	Un Samayal Arayil / Oggarane / Ulavacharu Biriyani	Tamil / Kannada / Telugu	Yes	Yes	
2016	Manavoori Ramayanam / Idolle Ramayana	Telugu / Kannada	Yes	Yes	
2022	Tadka	Hindi	Yes	Yes	
2024	Photo	Kannada	Presenter	No	
