= List of awards and nominations received by Prakash Raj =

Prakash Raj awards and nominations
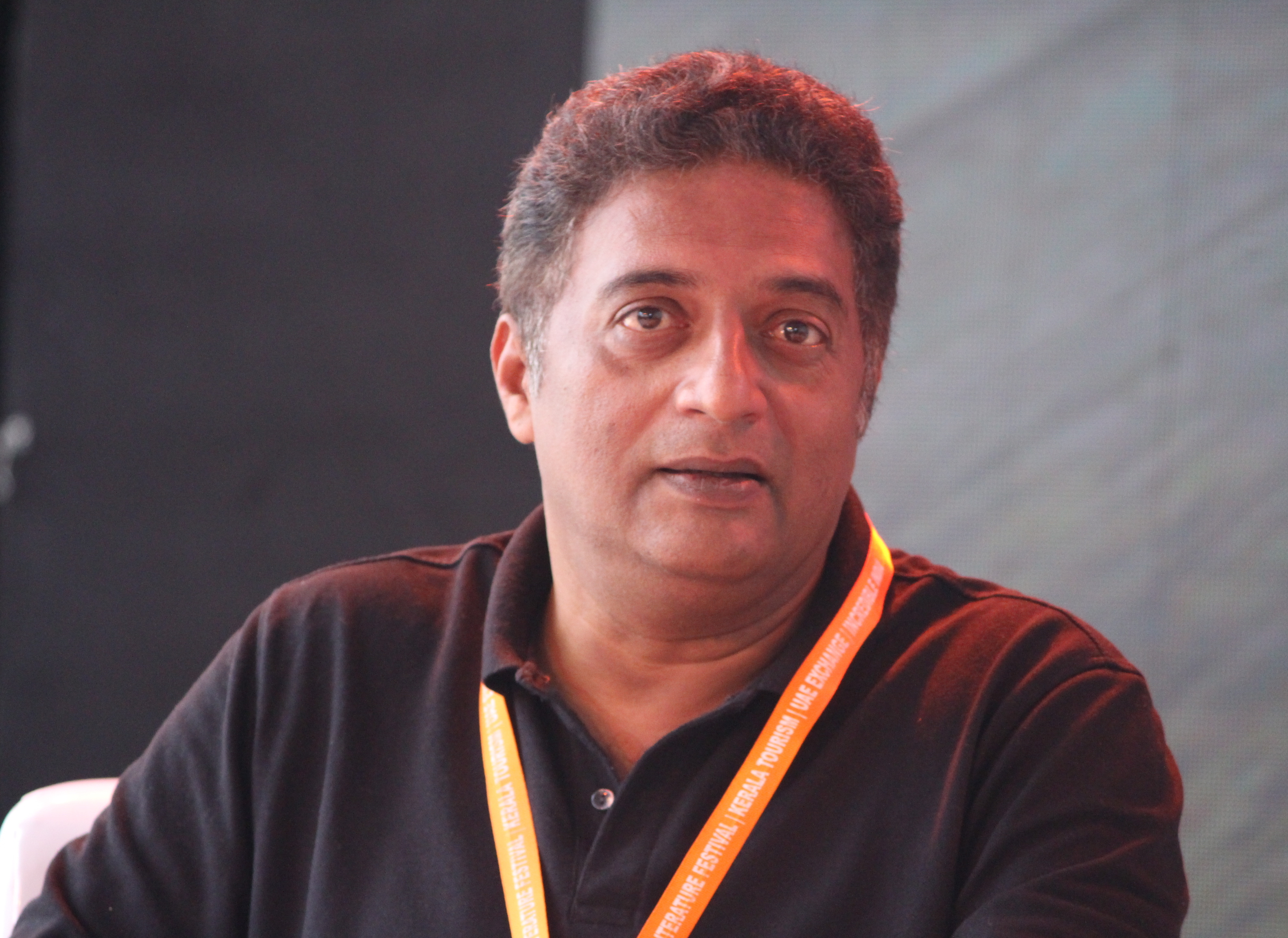
- Raj at Kerala Literature Festival 2018
Awards and nominations
Award	Wins	Nominations

Totals (Note: Certain award groups do not simply award one winner. They acknowledge several different recipients, have runners-up, and have third place. Since this is a specific recognition and is different from losing an award, runner-up mentions are considered wins in this award tally. For simplification and to avoid errors, each award in this list has been presumed to have had a prior nomination.)
- Wins: 47
- Nominations: 50

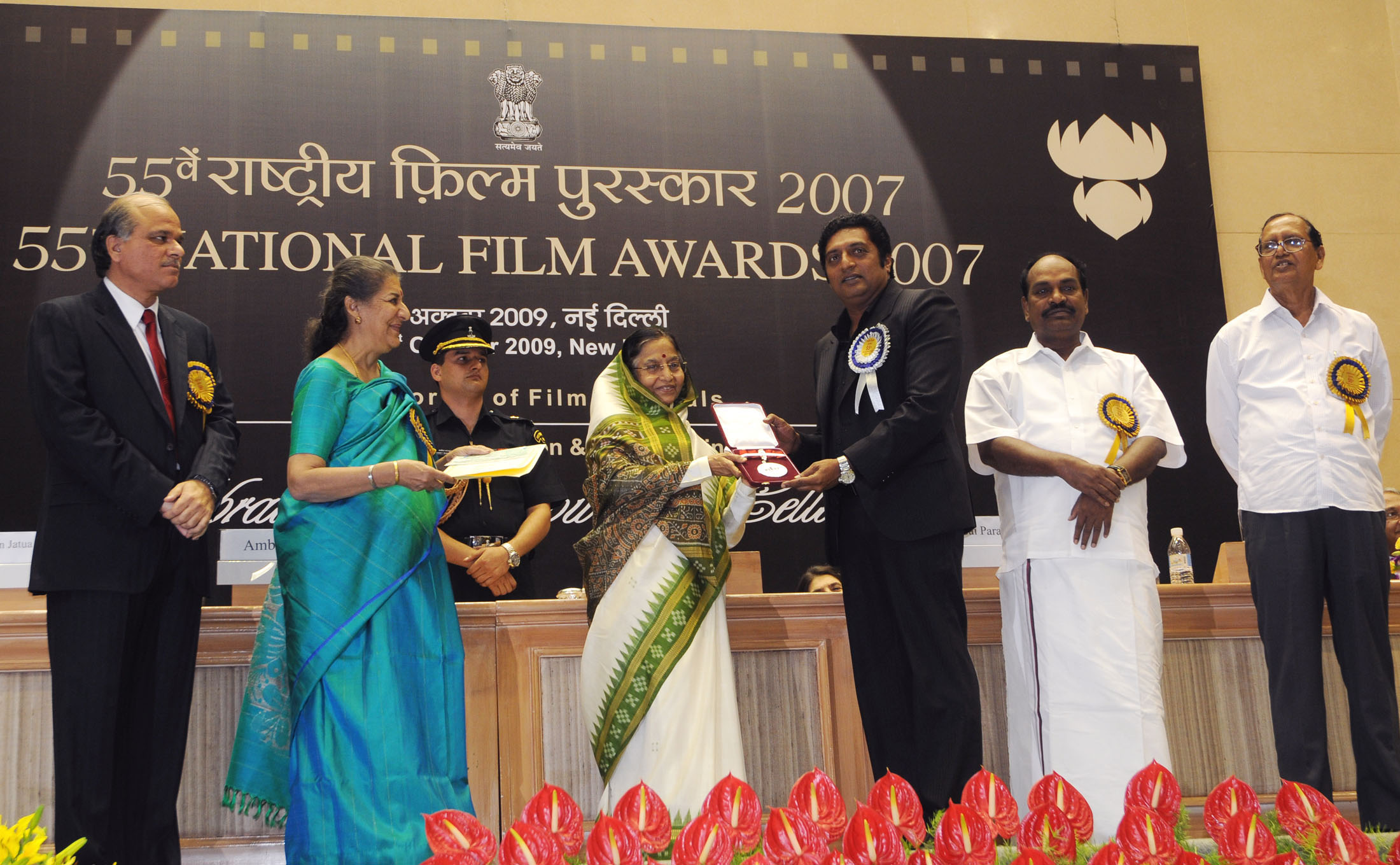
Raj receiving National Film Award from Pratibha Patil, the 12th President of India in 2009

Prakash Raj is an Indian actor, director, producer, television presenter, and politician. He worked predominantly in Telugu, Tamil, Kannada, Hindi and Malayalam-language films. Prakash Raj is the recipient of many awards and nominations. As of 2021, Prakash Raj has won five National Film Awards, eight Nandi Awards, eight Tamil Nadu State Film Awards, six Filmfare Awards South, four SIIMA Awards, three CineMAA Awards, and three Vijay Awards.

== Apsara Film and Television Producers Guild Awards ==
The Apsara Film & Television Producers Guild Award is presented by the Bollywood film industry to honour and recognize the professional excellence of their peers. Balan has received three awards from four nominations. 32 awards 12 nominations

Year	Film	Category	Outcome	Ref.
2012	Singham	Best Actor in a Negative Role	Won	14

== Filmfare Awards South ==
The Filmfare Awards South is a segment of Filmfare Awards, which is given to the South Indian film industry, that consists of the Tamil, Telugu, Malayalam and Kannada film industries.

Year	Film	Language	Category	Outcome	Ref.
2002	Nuvve Nuvve	Telugu	Best Supporting Actor	Won	
2002	Khadgam	Telugu	Best Supporting Actor	Nominated	
2003	Tagore	Telugu	Best Supporting Actor	Won	
2003	Amma Nanna O Tamila Ammayi	Telugu	Best Supporting Actor	Nominated	
2003	Chokka Thangam	Tamil	Best Supporting Actor	Nominated	
2004	Ghilli	Tamil	Best Villain	Won	
2005	Sivakasi	Tamil	Best Villain	Won	
2006	Bommarillu	Telugu	Best Supporting Actor	Nominated	
2007	Mozhi	Tamil	Best Film	Nominated	
2008	Kotha Bangaru Lokam	Telugu	Best Supporting Actor	Nominated	
2008	Abhiyum Naanum	Tamil	Best Supporting Actor	Nominated	
2009	Kanchivaram	Tamil	Best Actor	Won	
2009	Aakasamantha	Telugu	Best Supporting Actor	Nominated	
2010	Naanu Nanna Kanasu	Kannada	Best Director	Nominated	
2010	Singam	Tamil	Best Supporting Actor	Nominated	
2011	Dookudu	Telugu	Best Supporting Actor	Nominated	
2013	Seethamma Vakitlo Sirimalle Chettu	Telugu	Best Supporting Actor	Nominated	
2014	Govindudu Andarivadele	Telugu	Best Supporting Actor	Nominated	
2015	Oggarane	Kannada	Best Director	Nominated	
2015	O Kadhal Kanmani	Tamil	Best Supporting Actor	Nominated	
2017	Sathamanam Bhavati	Telugu	Best Supporting Actor	Nominated	
2022	KGF: Chapter 2	Kannada	Best Supporting Actor	Nominated	
2023	Ranga Maarthaanda	Telugu	Critics Award for Best Actor	Won	
2023	Ranga Maarthaanda	Telugu	Best Actor – Telugu	Nominated	
2024	Bagheera	Kannada	Best Supporting Actor	Nominated	

== International Indian Film Academy Awards ==
The International Indian Film Academy Awards are presented annually by the International Indian Film Academy to honour both artistic and technical excellence of professionals in Bollywood, the Hindi language film industry.

Year	Film	Category	Outcome	Ref.
2012	Singham	Best Performance in a Negative Role	Won	

== International Tamil Film Awards ==
The International Tamil Film Awards is an awards ceremony that honours excellence in Tamil language films around the world since 2003.

Year	Film	Category	Outcome	Ref.
2003	Kannathil Muthamittal	Best Supporting Actor	Won	

== Nandi Awards ==
The Nandi Awards are the most important awards given for Telugu films. They are given annually by the Government of Andhra Pradesh.

Year	Film	Category	Outcome	Ref.
1996	Gunshot	Best Villain	Won	
1998	Anthahpuram	Best Character Actor	Won	
2000	Azad	Best Character Actor	Won	
2002	Khadgam	Best Supporting Actor	Won	
2003	Amma Nanna O Tamila Ammayi	Best Character Actor	Won	
2003	Gangotri	Best Villain	Won	
2006	Bommarillu	Best Supporting Actor	Won	
2011	Dookudu	Best Supporting Actor	Won	

== National Film Awards ==
The National Film Awards, established in 1954, are the most prominent awards for films in India, administered by the Directorate of Film Festivals since 1973.

Year	Film	Language	Category	Outcome	Ref.
1997	Iruvar	Tamil	Best Supporting Actor	Won	
1998	Anthapuram	Telugu	Special Mention	Won	
2002	Dhaya	Tamil	Special Jury Award	Won	
2007	Kanchivaram	Tamil	Best Actor	Won	
2010	Puttakkana Highway	Kannada	Best Feature Film in Kannada (As producer)	Won	

== Santosham Film Awards ==
The Santosham Film Awards are presented by Santosham film magazine to honour excellence in Telugu films. It has given annually since 2003.

Year	Film	Category	Outcome	Ref.
2003	Okkadu	Best Villain Award	Won	

== Tamil Nadu State Film Awards ==
The Tamil Nadu State Film Awards are the most important awards given for Tamil films. They are given annually by the Government of Tamil Nadu. The winners are selected by a jury headed by a chairman.

Year	Film	Category	Outcome	Ref.
1996	Kalki	Best Villain	Won	
2000	Vaanavil	Best Villain	Won	
2005	Anniyan	Best Villain	Won	
2007	Mozhi	Best Film – Second Prize	Won	
2008	Abhiyum Naanum	Best Film – Second Prize	Won	
2008	Abhiyum Naanum	Best Character Artiste	Won	
2009	Villu	Best Villain	Won	
2012	Dhoni	Best Film – Third Prize	Won	

== Vijay Awards ==
The Vijay Awards are presented by the Tamil television channel STAR Vijay to honour excellence in Tamil cinema. It has given annually since 2006.

Year	Film	Category	Outcome	Ref.
2006	Sivakasi	Best Villain	Won	
2007	Mozhi	Best Supporting Actor	Won	
2007	Pokkiri	Best Villain	Nominated	
2008	Abhiyum Naanum	Best Supporting Actor	Nominated	
2009	Kanchivaram	Best Actor	Won	
2010	Singam	Best Villain	Nominated	

== Zee Cine Awards ==
The Zee Cine Awards is an awards ceremony for the Hindi film industry.

Year	Film	Category	Outcome	Ref.
2012	Singham	Best Actor in a Negative Role	Won	

== CineMAA Awards ==
The CineMAA Awards are presented annually by the Telugu entertainment channel Maa TV to honour excellence in Telugu films.

Year	Film	Category	Outcome	Ref.
2003	Khadgam	Best Supporting Actor	Won	
2004	Amma Nanna O Tamila Ammayi	Best Supporting Actor	Won	
2012	Dookudu	Best Supporting Actor	Won	

== South Indian International Movie Awards ==
The South Indian International Movie Awards or commonly referred as SIIMA are given to honour excellence in the South Indian film industry. The awards are given for Tamil, Telugu, Malayalam and Kannada films.

Year	Film	Category	Outcome	Ref.
2012	Dookudu	Best Supporting Actor – Telugu	Won	
2013	Dhoni	Best Actor in a Supporting Role	Nominated	
2013	Dhamarukam	Best Actor in a Supporting Role	Nominated	
2013	Businessman	Best Actor in a Negative Role	Nominated	
2014	Seethamma Vakitlo Sirimalle Chettu	Best Actor in a Supporting Role	Nominated	
2015	Govindudu Andarivadele	Best Actor in a Supporting Role	Nominated	
2015	O Kadhal Kanmani	Best Actor in a Supporting Role	Won	
2016	Manithan	Best Actor in a Supporting Role	Won	
2018	Odiyan	Best Actor in a Negative Role	Nominated	
2018	60 Vayadu Maaniram	Best Actor in a Supporting Role	Won	
2021	Sarileru Neekevvaru	Best Actor in a Negative Role – Telugu	Nominated	
2021	Mayabazar 2016	Best Actor in a Negative Role – Kannada	Nominated	

== See also ==
- Prakash Raj
- Prakash Raj filmography
