= Uppina Kagada =

2017 film by B. Suresha

- Directed by: B. Suresha
- Written by: B. Suresha; Chethana Teerthahalli
- Produced by: Shylaja Nag; B. Suresha
- Starring: T. S. Nagabharana; Apoorva Bharadwaj
- Cinematography: Advaitha Gurumurthy
- Edited by: Prakash Karinja
- Music by: V. Harikrishna
- Production company: Media House Studio
- Release dates: 4 February 2017 (BIFF); 1 September 2017 (India)
- Country: India
- Language: Kannada

Uppina Kagada (transl. 'Sandpaper') is a 2017 Indian Kannada-language drama film directed by B. Suresha and starring T. S. Nagabharana and Apoorva Bharadwaj.

== Cast ==
- T. S. Nagabharana as Aachaari, the father
- Apoorva Bharadwaj as the daughter
- Mandya Ramesh as Chinnayya

== Production ==
The film was shot in Kudremukh for sixteen days. T. S. Nagabharana and newcomer Apoorva Bharadwaj were cast in the lead roles. The film is directed by B. Suresha. The film is based on two real stories in Afghanistan and Bagalkot. The film was produced by Saranya Nag, B. Suresha's wife who had previously produced his other directorial ventures.

== Release ==
The film was screened at Bengaluru International Film Festival. A critic from The Hindu noted that "However, unlike his earlier works, including Devara Naadalli and Puttakkana Highway, which were termed too ‘verbose’, this film is more poetic and subtle".

== Awards and nominations ==
Year	Award	Category	Nominee	Result	Ref.
2016	Karnataka State Film Awards	Best Art Director	Shashidhar Adapa	Won	
2017	Bengaluru International Film Festival	International NETPAC Jury Award for Kannada Cinema	Uppina Kagada	Won	
