= Sakkare =

- Film poster
- Directed by: Abhaya Simha
- Written by: Abhaya Simha
- Produced by: B. Suresha; Shylaja Nag
- Starring: Ganesh; Deepa Sannidhi; Ananth Nag
- Cinematography: Shashidar Adapa
- Music by: V. Harikrishna
- Production company: Media House Productions
- Release date: 18 October 2013
- Country: India
- Language: Kannada

Sakkare ( transl. Sugar) is a 2013 Indian Kannada-language romantic drama film written and directed by Abhaya Simha, which stars Ganesh and Deepa Sannidhi in the lead roles. The major portions of the film have been shot in Madikeri, Bangalore, Mysore and other places.

The film is produced jointly by B. Suresha and Shylaja Nag of Media House Productions and the music is scored by V. Harikrishna.

== Cast ==
- Ganesh as Vinay/Vinny
- Deepa Sannidhi as Neha
- Ananth Nag as Col Cariappa
- Anu Prabhakar as Sneha
- Vinaya Prasad as Vasundhara
- Achyuth Kumar
- Rajesh Nataranga as Nandakumar
- Siddaraja Kalyankar
- Jayalaxmi Patil

== Production ==
=== Launch ===
The film shooting officially began at the Dodda Ganapati Temple, near Basavanagudi, Bangalore. The Pooja was held quite early in the morning and immediately thereafter the unit members moved to Madikeri for further shooting of the film. The film is being produced by Shylaja Nag and B. Suresha of Media House Productions and directed by Abhay Simha who had already directed an award-winning film Gubbachchigalu earlier and bilingual film Shikari with Malayalam Super Star Mammootty in the lead role.

Hari Krishna is the music director of the film for which all the five songs of the film has been written by Yogaraj Bhat. The film will be shot for ten days in Madikeri after which the unit is returning to Bangalore.

=== Casting ===
After Ganesh's confirmed presence for the film, the director approached actress Radhika Pandit to essay the female lead role. However, due to her previous appointments with the film Drama, she could not allot her dates. Later Deepa Sannidhi was roped in her place. Actor Prakash Rai was first approached for a key role which he rejected and instead Ananth Nag replaced for the same.

== Soundtrack ==
The music of the film is composed by V. Harikrishna with lyrics by Yogaraj Bhat and Jayanth Kaikini.

Sakkare

Soundtrack album by V. Harikrishna
- Released: 4 August 2013
- Genre: Feature film soundtrack
- Length: D Beats

No.	Title	Lyrics	Singer(s)	Length
1.	"Yaakana Sigthivo"	Yogaraj Bhat	V. Harikrishna	3:50
2.	"Iddalliye"	Jayanth Kaikini	Sonu Nigam	4:14
3.	"Yene Adru"	Yogaraj Bhat	Tippu	3:41
4.	"Free Iddeera"	Yogaraj Bhat	Sonu Nigam, Nanditha	3:41

== Critical reception ==
Srikanth Srinivasa of Rediff.com wrote that "Sakkare seems to send a message that it is a movie for all those who are romantic at heart".
