= Yajamana (2019 film) =

- Theatrical release poster
- Directed by: V. Harikrishna; Pon Kumaran
- Written by: V. Harikrishna; Pon Kumaran
- Produced by: Shylaja Nag; B. Suresha
- Starring: Darshan; Rashmika Mandanna; Tanya Hope; Thakur Anoop Singh; Devaraj; Dhananjay; P. Ravi Shankar
- Cinematography: Shreesha Kuduvalli
- Edited by: Prakash Karinja
- Music by: V. Harikrishna
- Production company: Media House Studio
- Release date: 1 March 2019
- Running time: 164 minutes
- Country: India
- Language: Kannada
- Box office: ₹50–52 crore (Note: The makers announced that the numbers doing rounds on social media were not authentic and the production house does not endorse it.)

Yajamana is a 2019 Indian Kannada-language social action film written and directed by V. Harikrishna and Pon Kumaran and produced by Shylaja Nag and B. Suresha. The film stars Darshan, Rashmika Mandanna and Tanya Hope in lead roles. It also features an ensemble cast of Thakur Anoop Singh, Devaraj, P. Ravi Shankar, and Dhananjay in key supporting roles. The film's background score and soundtrack is also composed by V. Harikrishna.

Yajamana was released on 1 March 2019 and received mixed-to-positive reviews from critics. The film completed 100 days in theatres and emerged as commercially successful film at the box office.

== Plot ==
Devi Shetty is an oil trader and businessman who controls his oil empire with the help of his connections within the Mumbai oil mafia. He requests information about Hulidurga village, which is not involved in the oil market.

The village is managed by Krishna, who is in love with Kaveri, the daughter of Hulikar Nayaka, the village's protector and owner of the oil mill. One day, Devi Shetty arrives in the village to persuade the villagers to help him sell oil. Reporter Ganga covers the story.

Krishna warns the villagers that Devi Shetty intends to exploit the oil reserves beneath their village. He tells them that if they cooperate with her, they will lose everything. He publicly insults her and orders her not to take anything from Hulidurga. News of this spreads far and wide, prompting Devi Shetty to seek revenge by enlisting the help of Krishna's rival Mittai Suri. Suri successfully deceives the villagers. Devi Shetty's men capture Krishna and try to kill him, but he overpowers them and threatens to come to Mumbai and ruin her oil business. He arrives in Mumbai and stays at Ganga's grandfather's house. With the help of the oil owners, he starts selling oil.

However, Krishna faces many challenges, such as having to fend off several men in the market. Eventually, though, consumers start buying his oil and recognise its quality. He succeeds in the oil market. Meanwhile, in Hulidurga, people began to lose money on their products and started to commit suicide. Kaveri arrives in Mumbai to inform Krishna about the suicides. She plans to ask Devi Shetty for help, and Krishna joins her. When they meet Devi Shetty, Krishna pretends to apologise on behalf of his people. Shetty reveals this to the people via video conference. He told them that if they stopped the oil mill, he would restart it and they would regain what they had lost. Inspired by his words, the people stormed out of the meeting and insulted Devi Shetty.

After finding success in the oil market, Krishna travelled to the village to obtain Huliyappa's marketing rights. He then started selling oil under the brand name 'Nandhi Oil'. Meanwhile, Devi Shetty had lost money in the market. One of his supporters, Pulla Reddy, arrived to meet Krishna and form an alliance against him. However, Devi Shetty had a cunning plan that resulted in Krishna being arrested by the police for illegally stockpiling oil. In court, Krishna proved his innocence by revealing that Devi Shetty actually owned all the oil stocks. Unwittingly, Krishna had taken some of Pulla Reddy's products and stamped them with his own brand name. He asked the judge to remove the brand name to reveal the original. Krishna was pleased to see that the Nandhi brand was also used in the courtroom canteen.

The judge sent Devi Shetty's product to a laboratory for testing, which revealed that it posed a chemical hazard. Shetty was arrested and his brand was removed from the market. The company suffered a major downfall, whereas Krishna was released after proving his innocence. Shetty then targeted Krishna and his family, but Krishna managed to send them to safety. Shetty sent Pulla Reddy to steal documents containing evidence of their illegal oil business, but Reddy was unsuccessful.

Tragically, Hulikar and Kaveri were captured by Devi Shetty. Hulikar was given rat poison and died minutes later, having revealed everything to Krishna. Krishna arrived at Devi Shetty's oil store, overpowered him and set fire to the building. Shetty burned to death, after which Krishna became the main oil trader in Mumbai, producing oil from Hulidurga.

== Cast ==
- Darshan as Krishna
- Rashmika Mandanna as Kaveri
- Tanya Hope as Ganga
- Devaraj as Gurikar Huliyappa Nayaka
- Ravishankar as Pulla Reddy
- Thakur Anoop Singh as Devi Shetty
- Sadhu Kokila as Captain Jaganmohan, a cook in Mumbai
- H. G. Dattatreya as Hegde
- Mandya Ramesh as Kashi
- Hithesh as a worker
- P. D. Sathish Chandra as a worker
- Shivaraj KR Pete as a worker
- Sanju Basayya as Krishna's friend
- Malathishree mysuru as Krishna's grandmother
- Radha Ramachandra as Kaveri's grandmother
- Yaseen Nadaf as Kaveri's brother
- Suchithra as Huliyappa Nayak's wife
- Srinivas Prabhu as Judge
- Jahangir
- Shankar ashwath
- Manjunatha Hedge
- Yashwanth Shetty
- Vajrang Shetty
- Dhananjay as Mittayi Soori in Cameo Appearance
- Prajwal Devaraj (Special appearance in "Shivanandi")
- Prem (Special appearance in "Shivanandi")
- Vinod Prabhakar (Special appearance in "Shivanandi")
- Sharan (Special appearance in "Shivanandi")
- Chiranjeevi Sarja (Special appearance in "Shivanandi")
- Vineeth Darshan (Special appearance in "Shivanandi")

== Soundtrack ==
No.	Title	Lyrics	Singer(s)	Length
1.	"Shivanandi"	Chethankumar	Kaala Bhairava, Shashank Sheshagiri, Chintan Vikas, Santhosh Venky	03:59
2.	"Ondu Munjane"	Kaviraj	Shreya Ghoshal, Sonu Nigam
3.	"Basanni"	Yogaraj Bhat	V.Harikrishna, Varsha B. Suresh	04:23
4.	"Yajamana Title Track"	Santhosh Ananddram	Vijay Prakash	04:02
5.	"Hattrupayig Ondu"	Yogaraj Bhat	Vijay Prakash	03:40

== Release ==
Yajamana was released on March 1, 2019 across more than 600 silver screens world wide in Kannada. It was released covering more than 495 theatres in Karnataka alone and hit 50+ screens in other states of India on 1 March 2019.

The release date of Yajamana in United States and Canada was postponed to 8 March 2019. It was released across 55 theatres in USA and 3 theatres in Canada by Weekend cinema distributors.

== Reception ==
=== Critical response ===
Sunayana Suresh of The Times of India gave the film a rating of 3/5 and wrote "Yajamana is definitely a must-watch for fans of commercial cinema. It has all the necessary masala and also manages to slip in a message towards the end of the film." A Shardhha From The New Indian Express wrote "Yajamana does put in a serious thought on globalisation and monopoly, and comes out with both mass and class elements, holding good for all kinds of audience." Shashiprasad S. M. of Deccan Chronicle wrote "Along with the oil, Yajamana is mixed well with a short love story, in which Rashmika as Kaveri is paired opposite Darshan and the rest of it garnished with comedy and loads of action in addition to challenging dialogues." Aravind Shwetha of The News Minute gave the film a rating of 3/5 and wrote "The movie is predictable but that can be overlooked as it is a strong family entertainer with the necessary commercial elements."

== Accolades ==
Award	Category	Recipient	Result	Ref
9th South Indian International Movie Awards	Best Film	Media House Studio	Won	
9th South Indian International Movie Awards	Best Director	V.Harikrishna; Pon Kumaran	Won	
9th South Indian International Movie Awards	Best Actor- Kannada	Darshan	Won	
9th South Indian International Movie Awards	Best Actress	Rashmika Mandanna	Nominated	
9th South Indian International Movie Awards	Critic's Best Actress	Rashmika Mandanna	Won	
9th South Indian International Movie Awards	Best Supporting Actor	Devaraj	Won	
9th South Indian International Movie Awards	Best Supporting Actress	Tanya Hope	Nominated	
9th South Indian International Movie Awards	Best Actor in a Negative Role	Thakur Anoop Singh	Nominated	
9th South Indian International Movie Awards	Best Comedian	Sadhu Kokila	Won	
9th South Indian International Movie Awards	Best Music Director	V. Harikrishna	Won	
9th South Indian International Movie Awards	Best Male Playback Singer	Kaala Bhairava, Shashank Sheshagiri, Chintan Vikas, Santhosh Venky "Shivanandi"	Won	
9th South Indian International Movie Awards	Best Female Playback Singer	Varsha B. Suresh "Basanni"	Nominated	
9th South Indian International Movie Awards	Best Cinematographer	Shreesha Kuduvalli	Nominated	
