= Kranti (2023 film) =

2023 Indian film by V. Harikrishna

- Theatrical release poster
- Directed by: V. Harikrishna
- Produced by: B. Suresha; Shylaja Nag
- Starring: Darshan; Rachita Ram; V Ravichandran; Tarun Arora; P. Ravi Shankar; Sampath Raj
- Cinematography: A. Karunakar
- Edited by: Pasha
- Music by: V. Harikrishna
- Production company: Media House Studio
- Distributed by: Media House Studio
- Release date: 26 January 2023
- Running time: 163 minutes
- Country: India
- Language: Kannada
- Box office: ₹41 crore

Kranti (transl. Revolution) is a 2023 Indian Kannada-language action drama film directed by V. Harikrishna. Besides the direction, V.Harikrishna also composed the Music. It stars Darshan and Rachita Ram in the lead roles alongside Ravichandran. The film was Produced by Shylaja Nag and B. Suresha, under Media House Studio.

Kranti was theatrically released on 26 January 2023, coinciding with the Indian Republic Day holiday, and received negative reviews from critics and audience.

== Plot ==
Kranti Rayanna is an NRI business magnate who is called by his master, Srikantaiah, to attend the 100th celebration of the government school he studied in his childhood. Kranti returns home from Europe and meets a school teacher named Sadashivayya who reveals to Kranti that his school along, with 12,000 other government schools, is in danger from Salatri, a shrewd businessman, who wants to privatise the government schools by issuing a government order with the help of corrupt Education minister Vaman Rao and Narasappa, a gangster. After learning this, Kranti wages a revolution against Salatri, Vaman Rao, Narasappa. He thrashes Narasappa's son, Nanjappa, and forcefully closes the private schools to seek attention from the Chief Minister, who later holds a meeting with Kranti. At the meeting, Kranti makes an eye-opening speech about the necessity for government schools to provide free education in order to remove the parents' burden. The Chief Minister is convinced and issues orders to renovate government schools and not to privatize them. Later, Vaman Rao resigns himself from his position, while Salatri is arrested for his illegal activities.

== Cast ==
- Darshan as Kranti Rayanna
- Rachita Ram as Usha, Kranti's classmate and love interest
- Ravichandran as Bhargava Rayanna, Kranti's father
- Sumalatha as Chief Minister
- Tarun Arora as Salatri
- Sampath Raj as Education minister Vaman Rao
- P. Ravi Shankar as Narasappa
- Achyuth Kumar as Sadashivayya, a school teacher
- B. Suresha as Srikantaiah, Kranti's school headmaster
- Sadhu Kokila as Kranti's aide
- Girija Lokesh as Rukkamma, Kranti's school teacher
- Mukhyamantri Chandru as Basava Rayanna, Kranti's grandfather
- Umashree as Kranti's grandmother
- Samyukta Hornad as Jenny, Kranti's friend
- Mutant Raghu as Najappa, Narasappa's son

== Production ==
The film was tentatively known as #D55. On 10 September 2021, its official title was unveiled as Kranti. The film was then launched on 15 October 2021.

== Music ==
The music of the film is composed by V. Harikrishna. The first single titled "Dharani" was released on 10 December 2022. The second single "Bombe Bombe" was released on 18 December 2022. The third single "Pushpavati" was released on 25 December 2022.

Kranti

Soundtrack album by V. Harikrishna
- Released: 2022
- Recorded: 2022
- Genre: Feature film soundtrack
- Length: 14:17
- Language: Kannada
- Label: DBeats

V. Harikrishna chronology
'Adyaksha in America' (2019)	Kranti (2022)

Singles from Kranti
- 1. "Dharani" Released: 10 December 2022; 2. "Bombe Bombe" Released: 18 December 2022; 3. "Pushpavati" Released: 25 December 2022; 4. "Dont Mess With Him" Released: 14 January 2023

Kannada track listing
No.	Title	Lyrics	Singer(s)	Length
1.	"Dharani"	V. Nagendra Prasad	Pancham Jeeva, Santhosh Venky, Aniruddha Sastry, Madhwesh Baradwaj, Vihan, Khushala, Lakshmi Vijay, Meghana Kulkarni, Pooja Rao, Archana, Prarthana	4:12
2.	"Bombe Bombe"	Yogaraj Bhat	Sonu Nigam	3:28
3.	"Pushpavati"	Yogaraj Bhat	V. Harikrishna, Aishwarya Rangarajan	4:05
4.	"Dont Mess With Him"	Chethan Kumar	Ranjith, Tippu, Aniruddha Sastry	4:05
Total length:				14:17

Tamil track listing
No.	Title	Lyrics	Singer(s)	Length
1.	"Uzhagil"	Madhurakavi	Balaji Sri, Santhosh Venky, Aniruddha Sastry, Madhwesh Baradwaj, Vihan, Khushala, Lakshmi Vijay, Meghana Kulkarni, Pooja Rao, Archana, Prarthana	4:12
2.	"Anbe Anbe"	Madhurakavi	Jithin Raj	3:28

Telugu track listing
No.	Title	Lyrics	Singer(s)	Length
1.	"Matti"	Bhaskarabhatla	Hemanth, Santhosh Venky, Aniruddha Sastry, Madhwesh Baradwaj, Vihan, Khushala, Lakshmi Vijay, Meghana Kulkarni, Pooja Rao, Archana, Prarthana	4:12
2.	"Bomma Bomma"	Sai Sukanya	Vijay Prakash	3:28

Malayalam track listing
No.	Title	Lyrics	Singer(s)	Length
1.	"Dharanee"	Sudamshu	Ajay Warrier, Renjith Unni, Jithin Raj, Sreeraj Sahajan, Kamalaja, Aishwarya, Feji Devu	4:12
2.	"Melle Melle"	Sudamshu	Jithin Raj	3:28

Hindi track listing
No.	Title	Lyrics	Singer(s)	Length
1.	"Dharti"	Deepak V Bharti	Pancham Jeeva, Santhosh Venky, Aniruddha Sastry, Madhwesh Baradwaj, Vihan, Khushala, Lakshmi Vijay, Meghana Kulkarni, Pooja Rao, Archana, Prarthana	4:12
2.	"Haule Haule"	Deepak V Bharti	Vijay Prakash	3:28

== Release ==
The film was theatrically released on 26 January 2023 coinciding with Republic Day of India. The satellite rights of the film were sold to Udaya TV for ₹12-13 crore and streaming rights to Amazon Prime Video for ₹17.5 crore. It was premiered on Amazon Prime Video from 23 February 2023.

== Reception ==
=== Critical Review ===
The film was panned by the critics, with Deccan herald terming the movie "old-school and tiresome" and News Minute characterising it as "silly both in writing and in execution".

=== Box-Office ===
The non-theatrical collections were reported to be around ₹46 crores. The cumulative collections of theatrical, digital and satellite rights were reported to be ₹100 crores. reports emerged that the movie was one of the highest grosser of the year, though the collections were only ₹41 crores. This was the second highest-grossing Kannada movie of 2023.
