= Mandya Ramesh =

Indian Kannada actor

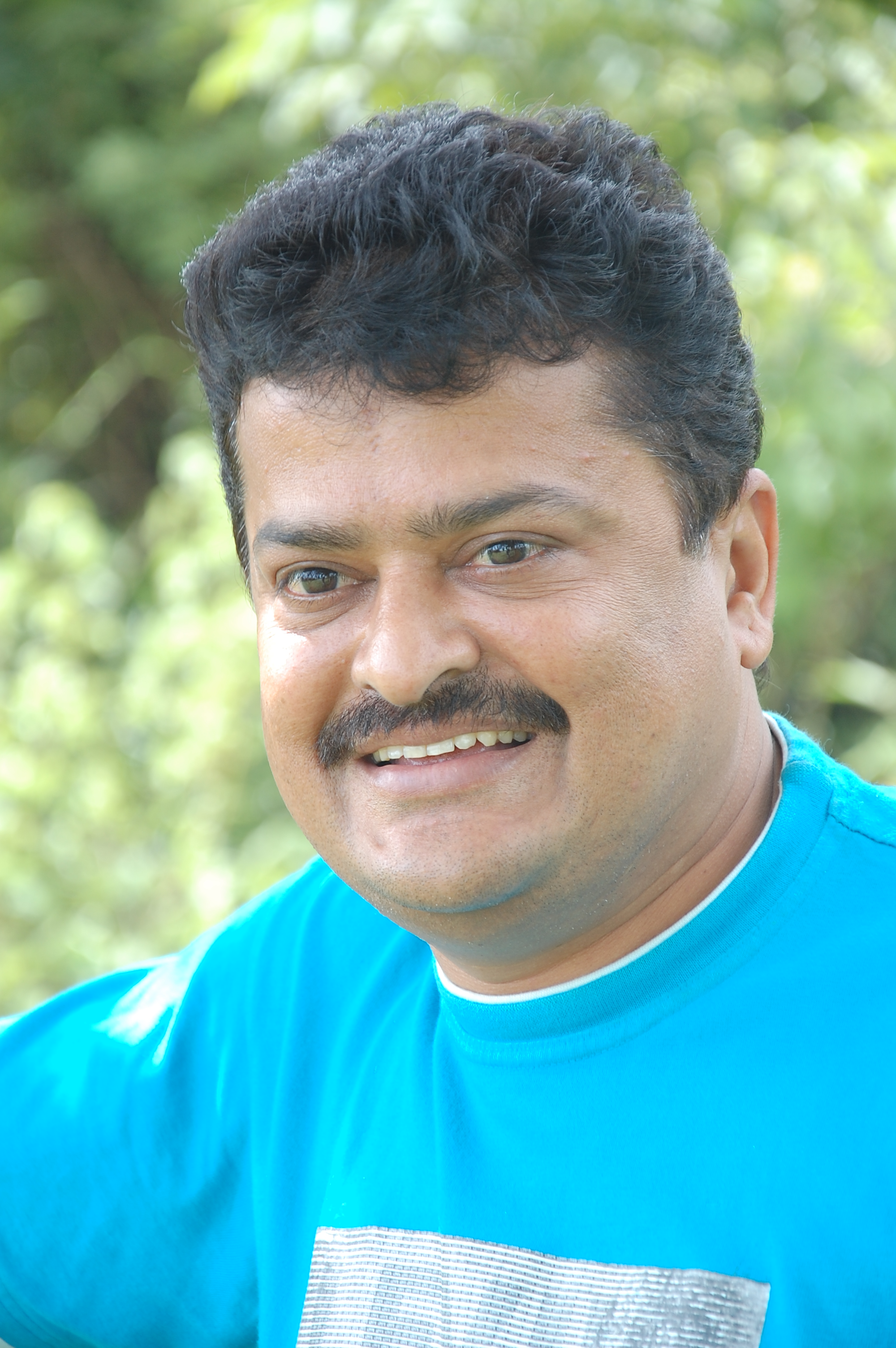
- Born: Kunthur Subramanyam Ramesh; 15 August 1963 (age 62); Mandya, Mysore State, India
- Occupations: Actor; theatre director
- Years active: 1982–present
- Spouse: Saroja Hegde
- Children: 1

Kunthur Subramanyam Ramesh (15 August 1963), known profesionally as Mandya Ramesh, is an Indian actor and theatre personality who mainly works in the Kannada theatre and films. He founded Natana Rangashaale, a theatre training institution based in Mysore. He is a recipient of the Karnataka Nataka Academy Award in 2017.

After beginning his acting career in theatre in 1982, Ramesh associated himself with Neenasam and Rangayana, working with prominent dramatists in Karnataka. His film and television career took off in the 1990s, and has appeared in more than 350 films and several television serials. He is noted for his performances in films such as Nagamandala (1997), Kanasugara (2001), Mata (2006) and Mussanjemaatu (2008). His role in Nagamandala earned him the Karnataka State Film Award for Best Supporting Actor. He is noted for his television work in Majaa Talkies (2015–2020).

== Early life ==
Ramesh was born on 15 August 1963 in Mandya, Karnataka, to N. Subramanyam (c. 1930–2020), a second-division clerk with a government department, and Nagalakshmamma, a homemaker. He has two older siblings: brother Anand Kumar, and sister Vallidevi. Ramesh spent his early years in Belluru, in Mandya district's taluk of Nagamangala. He was then educated in Mandya till grade two, when he lived with his grandmother, before returning to Nagamangala. He was drawn towards stage acting there and participated in several productions, also writing and directing plays while still in school. This continued when he returned to Mandya to pursue high school education. Ramesh cited Dr. Rajkumar as a huge influence to him as an actor while growing up. Ramesh's interest in theatre furthered when his father introduced him to traditional performance forms such as Bayalaata and company theatre. Ramesh graduated from the University of Mysore with a degree in science.

== Career ==
Ramesh started his theatre career in 1982 through a theatre workshop conducted by Ashok Badaradinni, a graduate from National School of Drama. He enrolled in Neenasam theatre institute in 1984 as an actor and technician. He was adjudged the best student there. In 1989, he joined Rangayana and worked under the guidance of B. V. Karanth for more than eight years. As part of the Rangayana troupe, Ramesh toured extensively across Mandya, Mysore and Chamarajanagar districts performing street plays as part of literacy campaigns, while also conducting annual theatre workshops for children to promote the Kannada language and culture. With Rangayana and later, Ramesh would work with other prominent directors such as Prasanna, B. Jayashree and K. V. Subbanna. In 2002, Ramesh founded his own school for theatre arts, Natana. He directed plays such as Oorubhanga, Chaama Chaluve, Subhadra Kalyana, Sayoo Aata, Mruccha Katika" and Sankranthi.

Ramesh's acting debut in films came in 1995, with a role in T. S. Nagabharana's Janumada Jodi starring Shiva Rajkumar. His portrayal of Kappanna in Nagabharana's next, Nagamandala (1997), earned him the Karnataka State Film Award for Best Supporting Actor. Ramesh has since appeared in more than 350 films such as Kanasugara (2001), Mata (2006), Oggarane (2014), Devara Naadalli (2016), Uppina Kagada (2017), The Villain (2018) and Yajamana (2019). Ramesh's television work as an actor came in serials such as Janani, Manethana, Chi Sou Savithri, Shreerasthu Shubhamasthu and Ivalu Sujatha. He also appeared as Muddesha in the sketch comedy show Majaa Talkies, hosted by Srujan Lokesh. He currently plays a lead role in the serial Aase.

Ramesh also wrote two books, Rangavalli (2010) and Kanavarike (2013) related to his life in theatre. In 2022, Mandya Ramesh Natana Kathe, a biographical work on his life written by N. Dhananjaya, was published.

== Selected filmography ==
=== Films ===
- All films are in Kannada, unless otherwise noted.

Year	Title	Role	Notes
1996	Janumada Jodi		
1997	Nagamandala	Kappanna	
1997	Mahabharatha		
1997	Vimochane		
1998	Hrudayanjali		
1998	Hoomale		
1998	Jagath Kiladi		
1998	Maathina Malla		
1998	Mangalyam Tantunanena		
1999	Janumadatha	Nagaraj	
1999	Tuvvi Tuvvi Tuvvi		
1999	Maha Edabidangi		
1999	Naanu Nanna Hendthiru		
1999	Sneha	Jagadish	
1999	O Premave		
1999	Chora Chittha Chora		
2000	Preethsu Thappenilla		
2000	Nan Hendthi Chennagidale	Television host	Uncredited role
2000	O Nanna Nalle		
2001	Maduve Aagona Baa		
2001	Mahalakshmi	Raju	
2001	Asura	Cheluva	
2001	Sri Manjunatha		
2001	Kanasugara	Balu	
2001	Sundarakanda		
2001	Kothigalu Saar Kothigalu	Kalappa	
2003	Ekangi		
2003	Kodanda Rama		
2003	Thuntata	Mandya	
2003	Hatthura Odeya		
2003	Colours		Lead role
2003	Kiccha	Umapathi	
2003	Gadibidi Brothers		
2003	Hrudayavantha		
2003	Dhad... Dhad...		
2004	Pandava		
2004	Kanakambari	Vasu	
2005	Aham Premasmi		
2005	Magic Ajji	Rajeshwari Devi's grandson-in-law	
2005	Sye	S. M. Krishna	
2005	Amrithadhare	Dr Subbu	
2005	Pandu Ranga Vittala		
2006	Mata	Nagesh	
2006	Shubham		
2006	Ravi Shastri		
2006	Neelakanta		
2007	Ekadantha		
2007	Meera Madhava Raghava		
2007	Maathaad Maathaadu Mallige		
2007	Orata I Love You		
2007	Lava Kusha		
2008	Mussanjemaatu	Ramesh	
2008	Zindagi		
2008	Anthu Inthu Preethi Banthu	Thimma	
2008	Payana		
2008	Naanu Gandhi		
2008	Pallavi Illada Charana		
2009	Meghave Meghave		
2009	Namyajamanru	DK Boss	
2009	Thaakath		
2009	Olave Jeevana Lekkachaara		
2009	Rajani		
2009	Mooru Guttu Ondu Sullu Ondu Nija		
2010	Ijjodu		
2010	Nooru Janmaku		
2010	Nam Areal Ond Dina		
2011	Kalla Malla Sulla		
2013	Kariya Kan Bitta		
2014	Gajakesari		
2014	Oggarane	Kalidas's uncle	
2014	Power		
2015	Melody		
2015	Ranna	Moorthy	
2015	Geetha Bangle Store		
2016	Devara Naadalli		
2016	Kiragoorina Gayyaligalu	Constable Narayana	
2016	Ishtakamya		
2017	Uppina Kagada	Chinnayya	
2017	Nemoda Boolya		Tulu film
2018	Ramadhanya	Dodda Dasayya	
2018	The Villain	Ramu's friend	
2020	Law	Police Inspector	
2022	Taledanda	Doddaranga	
2023	Kranti		
2023	Daredevil Musthafa	Seebayya	
2023	Kaasina Sara		
2026	Elra Kaleleyatthe Kala		

=== Plays (as director) ===
- Mruccha Katika
- Sankranthi
- Maranayaka
- Chora Chandradaasa
- Nagamandala
- Agni Mattu Male
- Sahebru Baruttare
- Yuyuthsu
- Ee Kelaginavaru
- Alibaba
- Neeli Kudure
- Govina Haadu
- Nayi Thippa
- Yugantha
- Vakra
- Ratna Pakshi
- Ailudore
- Chamachaluve
- Samsaradalli Sa Ni Da Pa
- Oorubhanga
- Subhadra Kalyana

=== Television ===
Year	Title	Role	Notes	Ref.
199?	Manetana			
2015–2020	Majaa Talkies	Muddesha	Jana Mecchida Vidushaka (Favorite Comedian)	
2021	Kavyanjali		Cameo; 1 episode	
2022–2023	Olavina Nildana			
2023	Weekend with Ramesh	Guest		
2023–	Aase	Ranganath		

== Awards and honours ==
- Karnataka Nataka Academy Award (2017)
- Samskara Bharathi Natya Samaroha Award for Best Young Theatre Director (1981)
- Karnataka State Film Award for Best Supporting Actor for Nagamandala (1996–97)
- Expert Committee Member, Department of Culture, Government of India (2000–2003)
- Member, Karnataka Nataka Academy
- Knock Out Award for Best Supporting Actor
- Udaya Film Award for Best Supporting Actor
- K. V. Shankare Gowda Theatre Award
- Sandesha Award
- Aryabhata Award
- Member, Ranga Samaja (Governing Council), Rangayana
