= Kiran Hegde =

Indian film director, writer and producer

Kiran Hegde (born 5 December 1981) is an Indian film director, writer and producer who works in Kannada films. Hegde is known for his psychological Crime Thriller work - Manaroopa.

== Career ==
Kiran was a communications professional in Bangalore prior he got into film making. Manaroopa is his debut work. In an interview given to The Hindu, Kiran expressed his thought of film making that he is in no hurry to make films immediately as he felt that his style of film making may not be liked by mass audience. He stated that he does films to express his thoughts and can afford to wait for the right time and story.

== Filmography ==
Year	Title	Cast	Notes
2019	Manaroopa	Dileep Kumar, Anusha Rao, Nisha B.R	
