= Manaroopa =

2019 film by Kiran Hegde

- Directed by: Kiran Hegde
- Story by: Kiran Hegde
- Produced by: Kiran Hegde
- Starring: Dileep Kumar; Anusha Rao; Nisha B.R. B. Suresha
- Cinematography: Govinda Raj
- Edited by: Suri and Loki
- Music by: Sarvanaa
- Production company: CMCR Movies
- Distributed by: Mysore Talkies
- Release date: 22 November 2019
- Running time: 132 minutes
- Country: India
- Language: Kannada

Manaroopa (transl. Reflection of Mind) is a 2019 Indian psychological crime thriller film based on the philosophy of Existentialism in Kannada language. The film also addresses the subject of Nihilism and Narcissism. The film is written and directed by Kiran Hegde. Produced by Kiran Hegde as well under the banner of CMCR movies, the music of movie is given by Sarvanaa and cinematography is done by Govinda Raj. Dialogues of this movie are given by Mahabala Seethalabhavi and Kiran Hegde. 90% of the movie has been shot in and around the hinterland of Sirsi and Siddapur forests of Western Ghats of Karnataka.

Manaroopa's story is about the dilemma of millennials and their maskaphobia (fear of masks). The film also captures narcissist characteristics that are portrayed by people in virtual world.

The film accommodates multifaceted human feelings from thinking perspectives of the new generation especially their inestimable contrasting attributes of ambiguity, obsessed with love & relationships, crime, morality, loneliness and helplessness.

== Plot ==
Five former college friends go for a night trek to a place in forest called Karadi Guhe. En route, they see many ominous signs. They decide to set up the camp and the group finds two people missing when they wake up. Another of their friend is gagged and tied up. They also find that all that they had was stolen overnight. There is a cryptic message on a balloon and they decide to split up to find their friends and go back to home. The story revolves on a two-day journey of a strange experience of all five friends. It keeps the audiences hooked as they too feel as if it is their own self-obsessions having a causal relation with the story of this movie.

== Cast ==
- Dileep Kumar as Gaurav
- Anusha Rao as Ujwala
- Nisha B.R. as Poorna
- B. Suresha as Psychiatrist
- Aaryan as Shashank
- Shivaprasad as Sharavan
- Amogh Siddarth as Gumma 1

The film also has Gaja Ninasam, Prajwal Gowda, Ramanand Inakai, Satish Golikoppa, Pawan Kalmane, Yashodha Hosakatta and K.N.Hegde in the supporting roles.

== Reception ==
Tanvi PS from Times of India gave Manaroopa 3 star out of 5. She said, "Manaroopa has the makings of a good psychological thriller - it is dark, eerie, a tad disturbing, and packs in some good thrills." Vijay Karnataka also gave it 3 out of 5 stars and called this film as 'a new age psychological thriller'. Kannada Prabha writes "Manaroopa film has a strange storyline which address on loneliness, self-destruction, psychological issues in the backdrop of forest in a good manner" and gave 3 stars.

== Accolades ==
- Best Experimental Film Award at Café Irani Chaii International Film Festival 2020, Mumbai, India
- Official Selection for Miami International Film Festival 2020 in Florida, United States
- Best Cult Feature Film Award; Best Foreign Feature Film Award; Best Thriller Film Award and Best Music Director Award for music director Sarvanaa at Istanbul Film Awards 2020, Istanbul, Turkey
- Best Debut Director Award for Kiran Hegde; Best Cinematography Award for Govinda Raj and Best Supporting Actor Award for Amogh Siddarth at 10th Dada Saheb Phalke Film Festival 2020, New Delhi, India.
- Best Thriller Film Award 2020 at The Out of The Can International Film Festival, United Kingdom
- Best Experimental Film Award at 14th Ayodhya Film Festival 2020, India

== Release ==
The movie is available on Amazon Prime Videos.
