= Devara Naadalli =

2016 film

- Directed by: B. Suresha
- Written by: B. Suresha
- Produced by: B. Suresha; Shylaja Nag
- Starring: Prakash Raj; Achyuth Kumar; Mandya Ramesh; Sihi Kahi Chandru; Manu Hegde; Manoj Annaiah; Disha Ramesh; Pranav Bhardwaj
- Cinematography: Advaitha Gurumurthy
- Edited by: Joni Harsha
- Music by: Hamsalekha
- Production company: Media House Studio
- Distributed by: Thoogudeepa Distributors
- Release date: 5 February 2016
- Country: India
- Language: Kannada

Devara Naadalli (transl. In God's Own Country) is a 2016 Indian Kannada language political thriller film written and directed by B. Suresha, inspired by an article that appeared on The Times of India in 1998, of an incident that occurred in a town in coastal Karnataka. It features an ensemble cast of Prakash Raj, Achyuth Kumar, Mandya Ramesh and Sihi Kahi Chandru. The film has received critical reviews from Japanese audience and lot of accolades as the film had Japanese subtitles which was the joint work of Sirish Chandrashekar and Ryozo Araki. This was nominated for South Indian film festival in Tokyo for the year 2016.

== Cast ==
- Prakash Raj as Kanitkar
- Achyuth Kumar as C. Manju Naika
- Mandya Ramesh
- Sihi Kahi Chandru as Padmakar Shetty
- Manu Hegde as Shankara
- Manoj Annaiah as Michael Madagaskar
- Pranav Bharadwaj as Bhatta
- Disha Ramesh as Savitha
- Kasaragod Chinna
- Kiran Naik as Teacher
- Kiran Vati as God

== Production ==
B. Suresha announced in June 2014 of the film and said that it would be based on an article of that appeared on The Times of India in 1998, of an incident that occurred in a coastal Karnataka town in 1993. He said that he followed the story and wrote the film's screenplay. Having developed the story years ago, Suresha was unable to find film producers for a long time. To raise money, he worked as a screenwriter for TV operas for a few years.

Prakash Raj, with who Suresha had previously collaborated in the 2011 film Puttakkana Highway, was cast to play a parallel lead in the film alongside Achyuth Kumar, Mandya Ramesh, Sihi Kahi Chandru. Disha Ramesh, the daughter of Mandya Ramesh was signed to play a supporting role, who made her debut in the film alongside Manu Hegde, another debutant. Filming began in early-September 2014 in Udupi district, Karnataka, and was to complete in a single schedule. It completed filming in November 2014.

== Release ==
Following post-production work, the film was shortlisted as one of the two Kannada films to be screened at the 7th Bangalore International Film Festival in December 2014. The screening was however cancelled due to the delay caused by the Regional Censor Board in issuing the censor certificate for the film. The "U/A" (Parental guidance) certificate was however issued for the film on 15 December, also suggesting "a major cut" of 45 seconds in one of the film's sequences. The reasons cited were that the film dealt with communal issues.

== Soundtrack ==
Devara Nadalli

Soundtrack album by Hamsalekha
- Released: 20 November 2015
- Recorded: 2015
- Genre: Feature film soundtrack
- Label: D Beats

Hamsalekha composed the music for the film and the soundtracks, also writing the lyrics for soundtracks. The album has four soundtracks.

No.	Title	Lyrics	Singer(s)	Length
1.	"Devara Nadalli"	Hamsalekha	Hamsalekha, Chintan Vikas, Moh
2.	"Antha Cheluveyene"	Hamsalekha	Hamsalekha, Prasad Cherkadi
3.	"Alleluaiah"	Hamsalekha	Sneha
4.	"Allalle Arrarre"	Hamsalekha	Hamsalekha, Chintan Vikas
