= Filmfare Award for Best Villain – Tamil =

Former Indian annual film award

The Filmfare Best Villain Award was given by the Filmfare magazine as part of its annual Filmfare Awards South for Tamil (Kollywood) films.

The award was introduced and first given at the 50th South Filmfare Awards in 2003, with Kalabhavan Mani being the first recipient. This category was discontinued after the 2005 edition of the awards.

== Winners ==
Year	Actor	Role	Film
2005	Prakash Raj	Udayappa	Sivakasi
2004	Prakash Raj	Muthupandi	Ghilli
2003	Jeevan	Pandiya	Kaakha Kaakha
2002	Kalabhavan Mani	Teja	Gemini

== Nominations ==
=== 2000s ===
- 2003 Jeevan (actor) - Kaaka Kaaka as Pandiya
  - FEFSI Vijayan - Joot
  - Kota Srinivasa Rao - Saamy
