= Chintan Vikas =

Indian singer

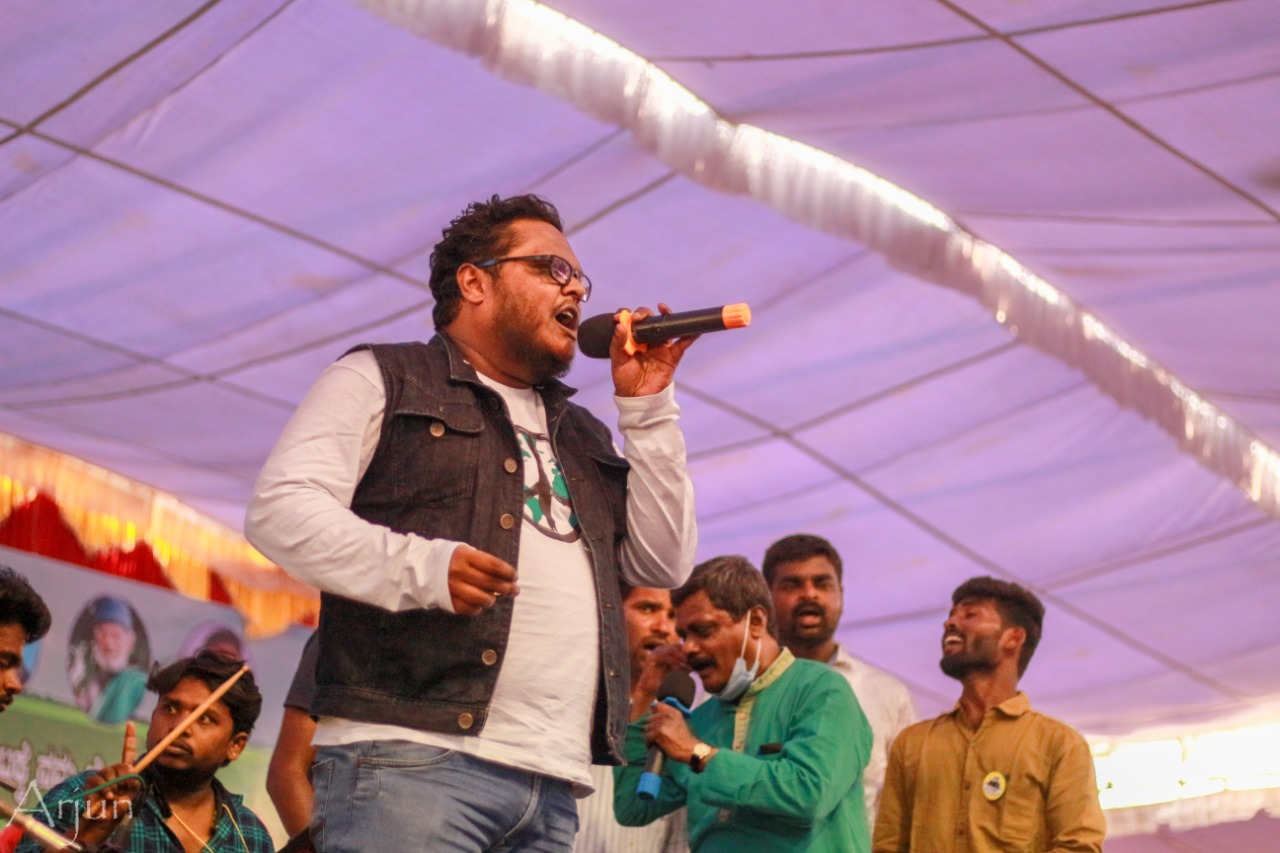
- Vikas, performing on stage in 2021

Background information
- Born: July 28, 1989 (age 37); Mysore, Karnataka, India
- Occupations: Singer; composer; theatre activist
- Musical career
- Genres: Filmi; Folk; Classical
- Instrument: Vocals
- Label: Independent Artist

Chintan Vikas (born 1989) is an Indian playback singer, keyboard programmer, percussionist, vocal arranger, dubbing artiste and theatre activist, known for his works in Kannada. For his song ’Saahore Saahore’ in the film Gajakesari, Chintan Vikas won the Karnataka State Film Award for Best Male Playback Singer in 2014.

== Early life ==
Chintan Vikas was born in Mysore to theatre personalities H. Janardhan and Sumathi. His father, known as Janny, served as the director of the Rangayana.

== Career ==
Chintan entered the theatre as a street play artist at the age of four. He learnt Hindustani Classical Music from musician Veerabhadraiah Hiremath and became an assistant to the composer V. Manohar.

He has worked with many composers in the industry including Hamsalekha, V. Manohar, V. Harikrishna, Arjun Janya, B. Ajaneesh Loknath, Charan Raj and others.

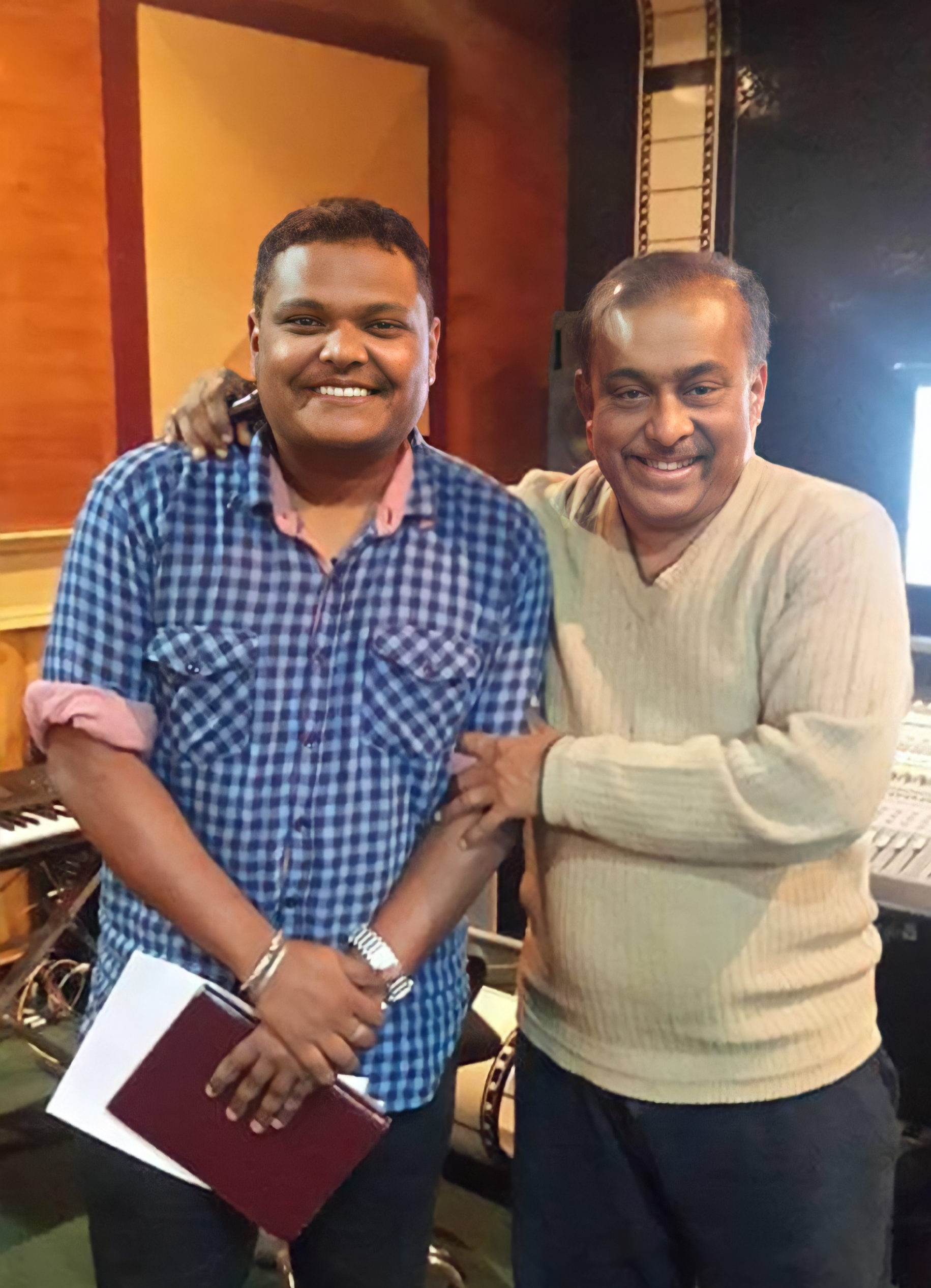
Chintan Vikas with Hamsalekha

== Awards ==
Year	Award	Film	Song
2014	Karnataka State Film Award for Best Male Playback Singer	Gajakesari	"Saahore Saahore"

== Discography ==
Selected film songs, recorded by Chintan Vikas, are listed here.

- All songs are in Kannada, unless otherwise noted

Year	Film	Song	Music	Co-singers
2011	Kanchaana	"Duddu Duddu"	Rishikesh Hari	Solo
2012	Cyber Yugadol Navayuva Madhura Prema Kavyam	"Maaye Maaye Maaye"	Vasu Dixit, Abhishek Lakra	Gurupriya
2012	Bhageerathi	"Bandano Bandano"	V. Manohar	solo
2013	Dyavre	"Angani"	Veer Samarth	solo
2013	Advaitha	"Karadipurada Garadiyolaga"	Veer Samarth	Shamita Malnad
2013	Jungle Jackie	"Yakinge Maimele"	V. Manohar	solo
2013	Chellapilli	"Kutti Shakeela"	Mikku Kavil	Malathi, Shamita
2014	Gajakesari	"Saahore Saahore"	V. Harikrishna	solo
2014	Saval	"Jen Kithmele"	V. Manohar	solo
2014	Saval	"Eddeddu Sidiva"	V. Manohar	solo
2015	Vamshoddharaka	"Natha Natha"	V. Manohar	solo
2015	Vamshoddharaka	"Alemaneyange"	V. Manohar	Supriya Lohith
2015	Mr. Airavata	"Mr. Airavata"	V. Harikrishna	Ranjith, Santhosh Venky, Shashank Sheshagiri
2015	Geetha Bangle Store	"Ale Ale Aleyo"	V. Manohar	solo
2015	Bullet Basya	"Common Common"	Arjun Janya	Malathi
2016	Kirik Party	"Lastu Benchina"	B. Ajaneesh Loknath	Varun Ramachandra, B. Ajaneesh Loknath, Chandan Achar
2016	Mukunda Murari	"Gopala Baa"	Arjun Janya	Vijay Prakash, Palak Muchhal
2016	Doddmane Hudga	"Naguva Nanjunda"	V. Harikrishna	solo
2016	Avadhi	"Yamapasha"	Sabhu Verghese	solo
2016	Sa	"Olagondu Horagondu"	Veer Samarth	solo
2016	Gajapade	"Sariyada Sanje"	Abhilash-Joyel	solo
2016	Devara Nadalli	"Devara Nadalli"	Hamsalekha	Hamsalekha, Moh
2016	Devara Nadalli	"Allalle Arare"	Hamsalekha	Hamsalekha
2016	Parapancha	"Dari Thappi"	Veer Samarth	solo
2016	Last Bus	"Doori Doori"	S. D. Aravind	solo
2016	Last Bus	"Doori" (theatrical)	S. D. Aravind	Sujatha Iyer
2016	Ishtakamya	"Naa Ninage"	Ajaneesh Loknath	solo
2017	Beautiful Manasugalu	"Preethi Maruva Santheyalli"	Bharath B. J.	Eesha Suchi
2017	Srikanta	"Kaalittare Yuddhake"	Ajaneesh Loknath	Hemanth, Shashank Sheshagiri
2017	Srikanta	"Shiva Shiva Maharaja"	Ajaneesh Loknath	Hemanth, Shashank Sheshagiri
2017	Bangara s/o Bangarada Manushya	"Thenege Thene"	V. Harikrishna	solo
2017	Mass Leader	"Ea Mannalli"	Veer Samarth	Prem, Govind Kurnool
2018	Amma I Love You	"Yetthuttaro"	Gurukiran	Siddharth Belmannu
2020	Bheemasena Nalamaharaja	"Thanneer Meedre"	Charan Raj	H. Janardhan, chorus
2021	Bypass Road	"Muddada Gombe"	Vijayakrishna D.	Solo
2021	1980	"Hey Kaalave"	Himself	Apoorva Shridhar
