= Shylaja Nag =

Indian film actor and producer

- Born: 14 May
- Occupation: Producer
- Spouse: B. Suresha (m. 1992)
- Children: 1

Shylaja Nag is an Indian actress and film producer known for her works in Kannada cinema. Some of the notable films produced by Shylaja Nag includes Yajamana, Puttakkana Highway, Devara Naadalli, Sakkare, Gubbachigalu and Artha). She owns Media House Studio, a production house. She is also partner of D Beats, a music company.

== Personal life ==
Shylaja is married to filmmaker and actor B. Suresha since 1992.

== Selected filmography ==
=== Films ===
- Kranti 2022
- Yajamana (2019)
- Uppina Kagada (2017)
- Devara Naadalli (2016)
- Sakkare (2013)
- Puttakkana Highway (2011)
- Naanu Nanna Kanasu (2010)
- Gubbachigalu (2008)
- Artha (2002–03)

== Awards ==
Year	Film(s)	Award(s)	Category	Result	Ref(s)
2020	Yajamana	Bangalore International Film Festival	Best Popular film	Won	
2010	Puttakkana Highway	58th National Film Awards	National Film Award for Best Feature Film in Kannada	Won	
2002-03	Artha	Karnataka State Film Awards	Karnataka State Film Award for First Best Film	Won	
