= Naanu Nanna Kanasu =

2010 film by Prakash Raj

- Film poster
- Directed by: Prakash Rai
- Screenplay by: Prakash Rai
- Story by: Radha Mohan
- Produced by: Prakash Rai; Shylaja Nag; B. Suresha
- Starring: Prakash Rai; Sithara; Amulya
- Cinematography: Ananth Urs
- Edited by: J. N. Harsha
- Music by: Hamsalekha
- Production companies: Duet Movies; Media House Studio
- Release date: 14 May 2010
- Running time: 136 minutes
- Country: India
- Language: Kannada

Naanu Nanna Kanasu (transl. Me and my dream) (Note: Kanasu also refers to the name of Amulya's character.) is a 2010 Indian Kannada-language comedy drama film directed by Prakash Raj (credited as Prakash Rai), starring himself, Sithara, and Amulya. It is a remake of the Tamil film Abhiyum Naanum (which was inspired by Father of the Bride) that was produced by Prakash Raj himself.

== Plot ==
The film is about a relationship between a father and his daughter. It emphasizes on how a father has to go through changes as his daughter grows up from being an infant to a grown woman married as per circumstances.

== Cast ==
- Prakash Rai as Raj Uthappa
- Sithara as Kalpana
- Amulya as Kanasu
- Achyuth Kumar as Brijesh Patel
- Rajesh Nataranga as Uthappa's friend
- Veena Sundar as Uthappa's friend's wife
- Sihi Kahi Chandru as Hayavadanachar
- Nishchitha Vidya as Jayanth's daughter
- Aruna Balraj as the school principal
- Manmeet Singh as Veerji
- Kawaljith Singh as Joginder Singh
- Ruthu as Jasbeer Kaur
- R. G. Vijayasarathy as the marriage registration officer
- Ramesh Aravind as Jayanth (special appearance)

== Production ==
Ramya was originally cast as the lead actress but left due to remuneration issues; she was later replaced by Amulya.

== Soundtrack ==
The lyrics and the background scores of all the songs in the movie were composed by Hamsalekha.

1. "Putta Putta" (Sonu Nigam)
2. "Ondu Maamara" (Kailash Kher)
3. "Mundooduva" (Sonu Nigam)
4. "Balukthalamma" (Shreya Ghoshal, Hemanth Kumar)
5. "Hello Uthappa" (Mohan)
6. "Kannaliddare Kanasu" (Sonu Nigam)

The film includes one more song not included in the audio soundtrack:

- "Sher Punjabi" (Rehaan Khan) (reused from original)

== Reception ==
A critic from The Times of India gave the film four and a half stars out of five and wrote that "It is a must watch family movie for all age groups without a single dull moment". Shruti Indira Lakshminarayana of Rediff.com scored the film at 3.5 out of 5 stars and says "Ananth Urs has done a decent job with the camera and kudos to Harsha, the editor for presenting a crisp output. In fact some scenes from the original have been done away with and a few minor changes have been made to a few others, contributing to the ideal length of the film. Book your weekend show for Nannu Nanna Kanasu. It is a must father-daughter watch". A critic from The New Indian Express wrote "Prakash Raj as a concerned and possessive father is superb. His dialogue delivery and gestures deserve appreciation. It is a different role for Amulya, who is known for playing innocent characters. The actor who surprises everyone with his performance is Achyut. He has even acted well in an emotional song sequence" B S Srivani from Deccan Herald wrote "That shouldn't be the case of the audience, who may discover some of the pleasures of plain, good old cinema. For, Prakash Raj’s “Kanasu” is the Kanasu (dream) of every father here". A critic from Bangalore Mirror wrote, "Laali, by Dinesh Baboo, was one film that explored the bond between a father and daughter. So, Naanu Nanna Kanasu is not a new subject for Sandalwood. Between the two, Laali is better. This film will entertain those bred on television soaps and make them realise that a story can be told in 150 minutes instead of years".

== Box office ==
In Bangalore, the film ran in theatres for 17 consecutive weeks.
