= Dhaya (film) =

- DVD cover
- Directed by: Senthil Kumar
- Written by: V. Prabhakar (dialogues)
- Story by: Senthil Kumar
- Produced by: Prakash Raj
- Starring: Prakash Raj; Meena; Raghuvaran; Lakshmi
- Cinematography: Vijay Milton
- Edited by: V. Jaishankar
- Music by: Bharadwaj
- Production company: Duet Movies
- Release date: 14 February 2002
- Running time: 163 minutes
- Country: India
- Language: Tamil

Dhaya (transl. Mercy) is a 2002 Indian Tamil-language action drama film directed by Senthil Kumar and produced by Prakash Raj. It stars Prakash Raj, Meena, Lakshmi and Raghuvaran. The National Film Award—Special Jury Award for Best Actor was awarded for Raj for this film. The film released on 14 February 2002.

== Plot ==
Dhaya is a feared and notorious rowdy in Chennai. He has amassed significant political influence, allowing him to engage in his criminal activities with impunity. The local police, aware of his power and connections, often turn a blind eye to his unlawful deeds.

Thulasi, a woman who recently moves into Dhaya's neighborhood, becomes concerned about his dangerous lifestyle. She makes multiple attempts to reform him, trying to show him a path away from crime and violence. However, all her efforts fail, as Dhaya is deeply entrenched in his criminal world.

The story takes a darker turn with the introduction of Rudhraiya, a former army man harboring a personal vendetta against Sharada Amma, a righteous woman who runs an orphanage for abandoned children. Sharada Amma is known for her good deeds and strong moral character. However, Rudhraiya, motivated by his unresolved past, hires Dhaya to discredit Sharada Amma and bring her down.

Dhaya, in line with Rudhraiya's plan, begins working for Sharada Amma, earning her trust. Despite Thulasi's warnings about Dhaya's true nature, Sharada Amma remains oblivious to his sinister motives. Dhaya cleverly manipulates the situation and gets himself hired as her car driver, all the while plotting to destroy her and her reputation.

At this point, Dhaya’s scheme takes a more insidious turn, involving a poisoning plot to carry out Rudhraiya's objective of discrediting Sharada Amma. The film’s tension builds as Dhaya’s duplicity unravels, leading to intense confrontations and revelations about his character and whether or not redemption is possible for someone like him.

== Cast ==
- Prakash Raj as Dhaya
- Meena as Thulasi
- Raghuvaran as Major Rudhraiya
- Lakshmi as Mother Sharada
- Ramesh Khanna as Kappi Sekar
- Dhamu as Thotti Siva
- Janagaraj as Selvaraj, Thulasi's father
- Pandu as Police Constable
- Pyramid Natarajan as Judge Venkatraman
- Bala Singh as Minister
- LIC Narasimhan as Minister's PA
- Vasu Vikram as Marimuthu
- Singamuthu as Nair
- Theni Kunjarammal as Bystander
- Bayilvan Ranganathan as Complainer
- Kovai Senthil as Complainer
- Bonda Mani as himself
- Simran as an item number in the song "Thorakatha Pottiye"

== Production ==
The film's director, Senthil Kumar, used to be an erstwhile assistant of Agathiyan.

== Soundtrack ==
The music was composed by Bharadwaj.

Track listing
| No. | Title | Lyrics | Singer(s) | Length |
|---|---|---|---|---|
| 1. | "Annathe Nadantha" | Snehan | Tippu | 04:55 |
| 2. | "Dhaya Dhaya" | Snehan | Manikka Vinayagam, Bharadwaj | 04:22 |
| 3. | "Aan Azhaga" | Snehan | P. Unnikrishnan, Sujatha Mohan | 04:42 |
| 4. | "Kadavulai Parthathillai" | Nandalala | Bharadwaj | 02:39 |
| 5. | "Thorakatha Pottiye" | Pa. Vijay | Anuradha Sriram, Manikka Vinayagam | 04:31 |
| 6. | "Guru Brahma Guru Vishnuee" | Snehan | Reshmi, Chorus | 03:23 |
| 7. | "Dhaya Dhaya Oorellam" | Snehan | Tippu, Chorus | 04:40 |
| Total length: | | | | 29:12 |

== Reception ==
Malini Mannath of Chennai Online wrote that "Daya is interesting at places, but could have been crafted better". A critic from Cinema Today wrote that "A film with life, it manages to also make an impact on our minds and thus succeed". Sify wrote "The film is made basically for the frontbenchers and Prakash Raj as the tough, frank-talking rowdy is fantastic, stealing the show with his amazing candour. Raghuvaran adds fire and brimstone expertly to the scenes assigned to him. Meena and Lakshmi are ok. Simran oozes dollops of glamour in an item number. Director Senthil Kumar has succeeded to a very large extent to help the producers cause".
