= B. Suresha =

Indian film director, screenwriter

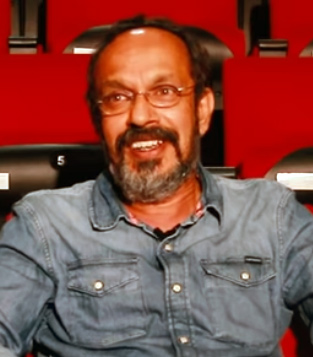
- Born: 26 August 1962 (age 63); Chandragiri, Karnataka, India
- Other name: B. Suresh
- Occupations: Director; producer; screenwriter; actor
- Years active: 1977–present
- Spouse: Shylaja Nag (m. 1992)
- Children: 1

B. Suresha is an Indian film director, producer, screenwriter, and actor who works in Kannada-language films. He is known for directing the films Artha (2003) and Puttakkana Highway (2011).

== Career ==
B. Suresha made his debut as a child actor with Ghatashraddha (1977) before working with Shankar Nag as an assistant director on several ventures including Accident (1985) and Malgudi Days (1986). He worked as a script writer notably collaborating with Ravichandran in 1993. He also worked as a television serial director and worked on Hosa Hejje (1991), Sadhane on Doordarshan and Naaku Thanthi. He made his directorial debut with Tapori and went on to work on several films including Puttakkana Highway (2011). In 2008, he returned to acting with Slum Bala. In 2016, his film Devara Naadalli based on a Times of India article released. That same year, he announced the launch of a new entertainment channel called Rangoli. 2017 saw the release of Uppina Kagada, which was about the journey of a young girl searching for her father. As an actor, he has worked on K.G.F: Chapter 1 (2018) and Ananthu vs Nusrath (2018). Outside of films, he has also written books.

== Personal life ==
He married Shylaja Nag in 1992; he had previously worked with her during the play Macbeth in 1988. They manage a production studio named Media House. The studio has produced several films namely Naanu Nanna Kanasu (2010), Sakkare (2013), and Yajamana (2019).

== Filmography ==
=== As a director, producer, writer ===
Year	Film	Credited as			Notes
Year	Film	Director	Writer	Producer	Notes
1988	Mithileya Seetheyaru	No	Dialogues	No	
1992	Harakeya Kuri	No	Dialogues	No	
1997	Thayavva	No	Dialogues	No	
2002	Tapori	Yes	Yes	No	
2002	Artha	Yes	Yes	No	
2010	Naanu Nanna Kanasu	No	No	Yes	
2011	Puttakkana Highway	Yes	Dialogues	No	
2013	Sakkare	No	No	Yes	
2016	Devara Naadalli	Yes	Yes	Yes	
2017	Uppina Kagada	Yes	Yes	Yes	
2019	Yajamana	No	No	Yes	
2023	Kranti	No	No	Yes	

=== As an actor ===
- Ghatashraddha (1977)
- Slum Bala (2008)
- Jugaari (2010)
- Parole (2010)
- Puttakkana Highway (2011)
- Tuglak (2012)
- Jatta (2013)
- Ulidavaru Kandanthe (2014)
- Benkipatna (2015)
- Endendigu (2015)
- Plus (2015)
- Badmaash (2016)
- Imaikkaa Nodigal (2018; Tamil)
- K.G.F: Chapter 1 (2018)
- Ananthu vs Nusrath (2018)
- Manaroopa (2019)
- ACT 1978 (2020)
- K.G.F: Chapter 2 (2022)
- Kranti (2023)
- Ronny (2024)
- Sidlingu 2 (2025)
- Operation London Cafe (2025)
- Rakkasapuradhol (2026)
- The Rise of Ashoka (2026)
- Rakky (2026)

== Television ==
As director

- Hosa Hejje (1991)
- Sadhane
- Naaku Thanthi

== Awards and nominations ==
Work	Award	Category	Result	Ref.
Shaapurada Seeningi Satya	Karnataka Sahitya Academy Award 1996	Play	Won	
Artha	Karnataka State Film Awards 2002–03	Best Director	Won	
Artha	Karnataka State Film Awards 2002–03	Best First Film	Won	
Puttakkana Highway	58th National Film Awards	Best Feature Film in Kannada	Won	
Act 1978	9th SIIMA Awards	Best Supporting Actor	Won	
Act 1978	67th Filmfare Awards South	Best Supporting Actor	Won	
