= Prakash Raj =

Indian actor (born 1965)

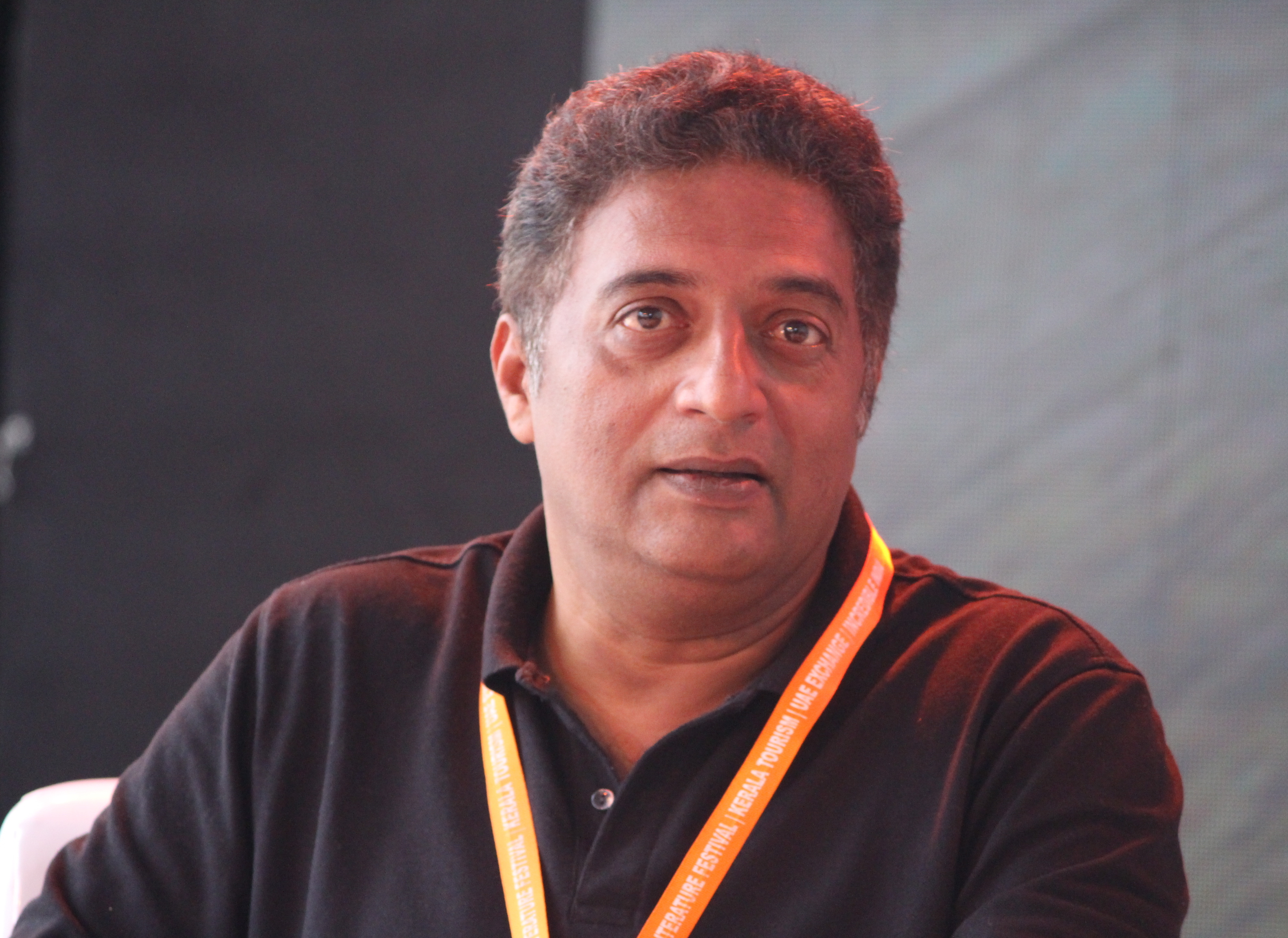
- Raj at the 2018 Kerala Literature Festival
- Born: Prakash Rai; 26 March 1965 (age 61); Bangalore, Mysore State, India
- Education: St. Joseph's University, Bangalore
- Occupations: Actor; film producer; director; television presenter; politician
- Years active: 1986–present
- Works: Full list
- Spouses: Lalitha Kumari (m. 1994; div. 2009); Pony Verma (m. 2010)
- Children: 4
- Awards: Full list

Prakash Raj (born Prakash Rai; 26 March 1965) is an Indian actor, film director, producer, television presenter, and politician. Known for his works in Tamil, Telugu, Kannada, Malayalam, Hindi and English-language films. he is the recipient of several accolades, including five National Film Awards, eight Nandi Awards, eight Tamil Nadu State Film Awards, six Filmfare Awards South, four SIIMA Awards, three CineMAA Awards, and three Vijay Awards. Apart from his native language Kannada, Raj's fluency in Tamil, Telugu, Hindi, and English has placed him among the most sought after actors in Indian cinema.

After working in stage shows and television in Kannada for a few years, Raj ventured into films. He made his debut in Tamil cinema through Duet (1994), by K. Balachander, and has since been a commercially successful film star in Tamil. In remembrance, he named his production company Duet Movies.

A polyglot, he played a variety of roles, most notably as the antagonist and, of late, as a character actor. Prakash, as an actor has won a National Film Award for Best Supporting Actor in 1997 for Mani Ratnam's Iruvar, a National Film Award – Special Mention for the Telugu film Antahpuram, directed by Krishna Vamsi in 1998 and a National Film Award for Best Actor in 2007 for his role in Kanchivaram, a Tamil film directed by Priyadarshan.

As a producer, he has won a National Film Award for Best Feature Film in Kannada for Puttakkana Highway, directed by his long-time theatre friend B. Suresha in 2011. Prakash was also the host of Neengalum Vellalam Oru Kodi during the show's second season.

== Personal life ==
Prakash Raj was born as Prakash Rai on 26 March 1965 to a Tuluva father and a Kannadiga mother in Bangalore, Karnataka. His brother is Prasad Raj, who is also an actor. He completed schooling at St. Joseph's Indian High School and joined St. Joseph's College of Commerce, Bangalore.

Actress Geetha introduced Prakash Raj to prominent Tamil film director K. Balachander. Prakash Raj changed his surname from 'Rai' to 'Raj' upon K. Balachander's advice; he is still called Prakash Rai in his home state, Karnataka.

Prakash Raj married actress Lalitha Kumari in 1994. They had two daughters, Meghana and Pooja, and a son, Sidhu who died in 2004 when he was five years old after sustaining injuries from a fall while kite flying. The couple divorced in 2009. Later, he married choreographer Pony Verma on 24 August 2010. They have a son, Vedhanth born in 2015.

Prakash Raj's father is a Hindu and his mother a Roman Catholic, but he identifies himself as a non-believer.

== Film career ==
Prakash Raj acted in back-to-back stage shows for ₹300 a month in the initial stages of his career, when he joined Kalakshetra, Bengaluru, and he has 2,000 street theatre performances to his credit.

Prakash began his television career with Doordarshan serials such as Bisilu Kudure (Kannada) and Guddada Bhootha (Tulu and Kannada). He later took up supporting roles in Kannada films such as Ranadheera, Ramachaari and Nishkarsha. He was noticed for his dialogue delivery and histrionics. His breakthrough role came in Harakeya Kuri (1992), directed by K. S. L. Swamy starring Vishnuvardhan, with whom he had acted in other films such as Mithileya Seetheyaru, Muthina Haara and Nishkarsha. His performance was noticed by Geetha, the lead heroine of the film, who introduced Prakash to her mentor K. Balachander, a Tamil director. He acted under the screen name "Prakash Rai" in Kannada films and was given the name "Prakash Raj" by K. Balachander for his debut Tamil film Duet (1994), which saw him playing his first major role. Under his direction, he won Tamil Nadu State Film Award for Best Villain in the film Kalki (1996).

Having started his career as a villain, the actor followed this up with a bunch of movies where he played the bad guy you love to hate across multiple film industries. Prakash Raj's acceptance across languages was also helped greatly by the fact that he is a polyglot. The actor, born as Prakash Rai in Karnataka, is fluent in Kannada, Tamil, Telugu, Malayalam, Marathi, Hindi, and English.

In Tamil cinema, Prakash Raj played the role of Tamilselvan based on the late M. Karunanidhi in the 1997 film Iruvar directed by Mani Ratnam. It stars Mohanlal and Prakash Raj as friends turned political opponents. Prakash Raj won the National Film Award for Best Supporting Actor in this film. Prakash Raj played the antagonist for the first time in Ghilli (2004), which is the Tamil remake of Telugu film Okkadu. He played the role of (Muthu Pandi) a villain with the essence of humour and brutality, and his dialogues in the film are a favourite among his fans. The multitalented actor proved through Vasool Raja MBBS (2004) that a villain does not need to do big fights. Prakash Raj played the role of a hospital dean and gave a one-of-a-kind performance in this film. Vasool Raja MBBS also marks Prakash Raj's first collaboration with Kamal Haasan. Prakash Raj played the role of a father in the romantic drama Santosh Subramaniam (2008). The film directed by Mohan Raja, turned out to be one of the biggest hits in Tamil. He is known for his effective performances as a dangerous villain in Singam (2010) where he played a corrupt politician. The action drama written and directed by Hari, was a commercial success at the box office.

He acted in many Telugu films, including Antahpuram (1998), which earned him a National Film Award – Special Jury Award / Special Mention. He has played in lead role in Kanchivaram set in the pre-independence era, has bagged top honours - Best Film as well as Best Actor award for Prakash Raj at the 55th National Film Awards. Prakash Raj won Nandi Award for Best Supporting Actor for the films Khadgam (2002), Bommarillu (2006), Dookudu (2011) and Seethamma Vakitlo Sirimalle Chettu (2013).

Prakash became a film producer beginning with the Tamil film Dhaya (2002), in which he starred with actress Meena. It earned him a National Film Award – Special Jury Award for his performance. He later produced films in Tamil such as Naam (2003), Azhagiya Theeye (2004), Kanda Naal Mudhal (2005), Poi (2006), Mozhi (2007), Velli Thirai (2008), Abhiyum Naanum (2008) and Inidhu Inidhu (2010).

Prakash took on the mantle of director with Naanu Nanna Kanasu (2010) in Kannada, for which he was the joint producer. The film completed 125 days successfully in the theatres across Karnataka, becoming the biggest hit of the year. The first non-Tamil film that he produced was his directorial debut in Kannada, Naanu Nanna Kanasu, a remake of his own Tamil production Abhiyum Naanum, for which he was the joint producer, along with his long-time Bengaluru theatre friend, Kannada director-producer B. Suresha.

He produced the Tamil version of the Tamil-Telugu bilingual Payanam (2011), starring Nagarjuna Akkineni and himself. In 2011, he acted and jointly produced the Kannada film Puttakkana Highway, with B. Suresha, who directed the film. It was a milestone in Prakash's production career since Puttakkana Highway won him the National Award for Best Regional Film for the year 2010–2011, and an award in the fourth Bengaluru International Film Festival of 2011. In 2012, he produced two Tamil films; Mayilu and Dhoni. In 2013, he produced a Telugu-Tamil bilingual film; Gouravam.

In 2014, he directed the multilingual film Oggarane (in Kannada), Ulavacharu Biryani (in Telugu) and Un Samayal Arayil (in Tamil). Although the Tamil and Telugu versions did not do any miracles at the box office, the Kannada version became the runaway blockbuster hit of the year.

While he is a superstar in the South film industry, he has also made a different identity for himself by acting in Bollywood films. Prakash entered Bollywood in 2009 with the film Wanted. He acted in films like Singham (2011), Dabangg 2 (2012), Mumbai Mirror (2013), Policegiri (2013), Zanjeer (2013) and Heropanti (2014). He has played the villain in most of the films.

He won the Best Actor in a Supporting Role at the SIIMA Award in the Tamil films, O Kadhal Kanmani (2015), Manithan (2016) and 60 Vayadu Maaniram (2018). Prakash Raj won the Best Actor – Critics for his Telugu film Ranga Maarthaanda (2023).

== Philanthropy ==
Prakash Raj adopted the villages of Kondareddypalle in Mahabubnagar District, Telangana state and Bandlarahatti in Chitradurga district, Karnataka state.

== Awards ==
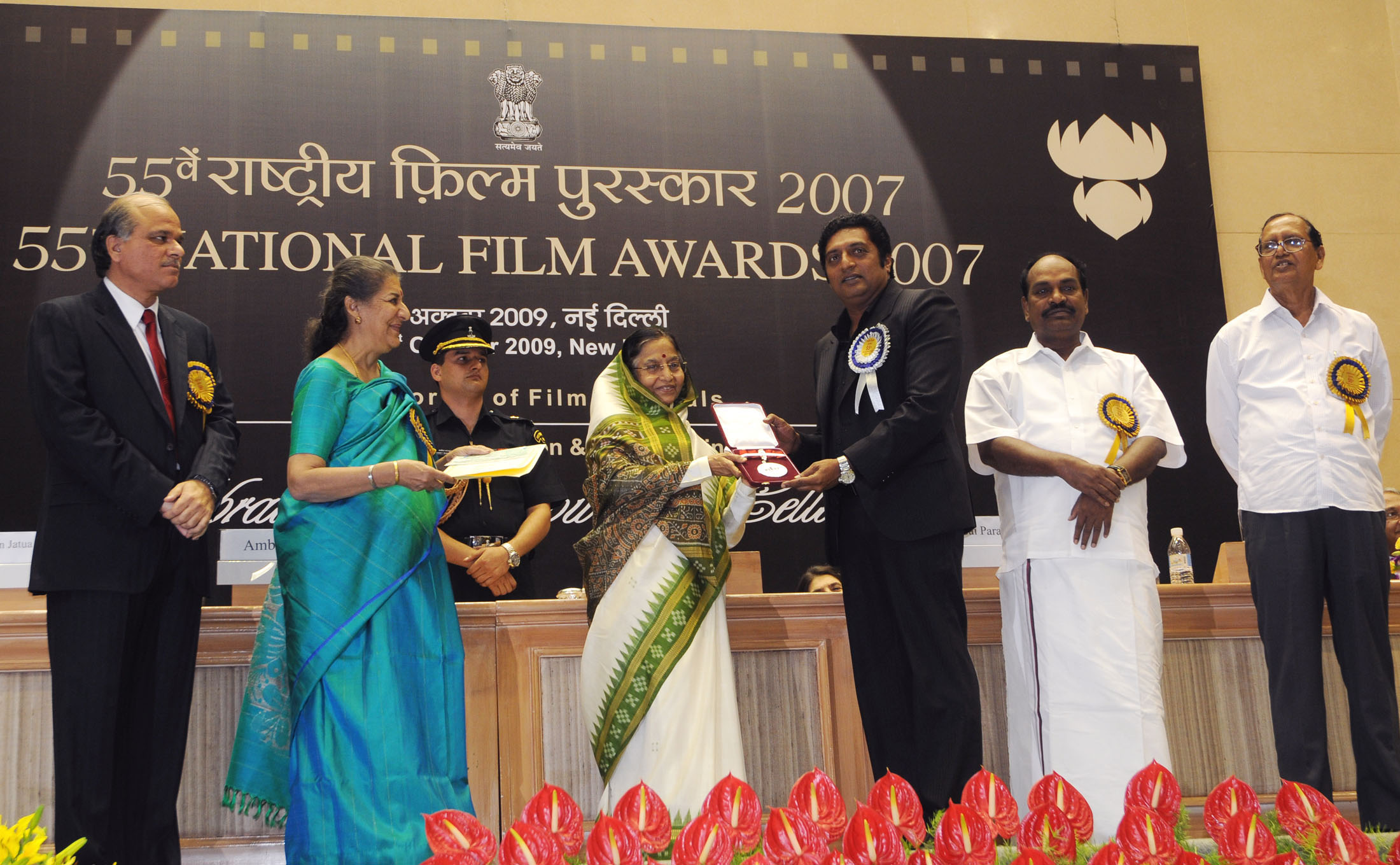
President presenting the Best Actor Award to Prakash Raj for the film Kanchivaram, at the 55th National Film Awards

== Political career ==
Prakash Raj started his active political movement with the hashtag #justasking on social media after his friend Gauri Lankesh's assassination incident in September 2017. He was very close to the family, including Mr. Lankesh, whose advice to be the 'eternal opposition' he mentioned at the WLF as being his political moto.

He contested in the 2019 Indian general election as an independent candidate for the Bengaluru Central Lok Sabha constituency. Raj lost the election, receiving around 28,906 Votes (2.41%) in the election. At the Wayanad Literature Festival, in conversation with Dhanya Rajendran he explained that he had not taken part in the election to win, but instead to learn what the process was like firsthand.

== Controversies ==
He was banned by Telugu film producers six times in the past. Prakash reacted to this by saying:

"If people who work with me say that I play hide and seek, why do they repeat me? Why am I in Mahesh's nine films out of his ten. Why don't you judge me with my work? How I go about it is not important. I don't go by the rules. I put my foot down, I don't take mediocrity. There are certain locations where I can come only at 12 in the morning. I don't go by the rules."

It was the first time that an actor was banned by the Telugu industry. Telugu film industry insiders interpret the ban as a conspiracy by several big heroes and producers. Problems started during the shooting of the Telugu films Pawan Kalyan's Jalsa, NTR Jr's Kantri, and Allu Arjun's Parugu.

There was controversy for his naked appearance in a sequence in his latest Telugu release Ongole Githa. The film got an "A Certificate" from the Censor Board. Prakash reacted by saying: "I did not shed my clothes for creating sensation, I had no plans to star in that sequence. The script demanded it; as an actor, I have to abide by the script. Director Bhaskar told me that it would be an 'important' sequence in the context of the film and I just carried out his instructions."

Several Kannada organisations staged protests in front of theatres since they felt that some of the dialogue in a scene in the Hindi film Singham, starring Ajay Devgan and Prakash were derogatory against the Kannadigas. The Karnataka Film Chamber of Commerce (KFCC) had demanded the deletion of all "objectionable" dialogue from the movie. The screening was stopped in major centres of Karnataka. The controversial scene starts off with Prakash threatening Ajay that he would bring 1,000 people from the Karnataka border to thrash him. Ajay (who plays Bajirao Singham, a Maratha), retorts that one lion would suffice to shoo away a thousand dogs. The controversy assumes significance in the backdrop of the decades-old border dispute between Karnataka and Maharashtra. Kannada protesters also felt that Prakash, being a Kannadiga should have told the team that it is not right. Prakash reacted to it to the Kannada and the Telugu media by saying: "I am a Kannadiga myself and I love my mother tongue Kannada. I'm very proud of my community and would never deliberately do anything to hurt my people. How would I allow conversations that provide pain to people of Karnataka in any movie in which I am cast? There is nothing controversial about the dialogue. I am a Maratha in the movie, the controversy has started just because I am a Kannadiga and I used the word 'Karnataka border' in the film because the villain in the film stays in Goa, the Karnataka border." Finally the dialogue was removed, and the whole team of Singham including the director Rohit Shetty, the production house "Reliance Big Entertainment", and Prakash apologized to all the Kannadigas; the issue was resolved.

In January 2026, Raj was criticized for narrating an adapted version of an episode from the Ramayana while visiting the Kerala Literature Festival. The version of Ramayana which was originally performed by a children's theatre group, portrayer Rama and Lakshmana as North Indians who entered Ravana's garden and ate fruits without paying. Raj's remarks prompted complaints against him for offending Hindu religious sentiments.
