= Puttakkana Highway =

- Theatrical poster
- Directed by: B. Suresha
- Written by: Nagathihalli Chandrashekar
- Screenplay by: B. Suresha
- Produced by: Prakash Rai; Shylaja Nag
- Starring: Shruti; Prakash Rai
- Cinematography: H. M. Ramachandra
- Edited by: Jo Ni Harsha
- Music by: Hamsalekha
- Production company: Duet Movies
- Release date: 20 May 2011
- Country: India
- Language: Kannada

Puttakkana Highway (transl. Puttakka's Highway) is a 2011 Indian Kannada drama film starring Shruti and Prakash Raj in the lead roles. The film was directed by B. Suresha. Prakash Rai and Shylaja Nag jointly produced this venture under Duet Movies and Media House banner. Hamsalekha composed the music and H. M. Ramachandra was the cameraman. The story is based on the novel Puttakkana Medical College by Nagathihalli Chandrashekar.

== Plot ==
The story exploits the dark and bright sides of the land acquisition scam. Puttakkana Highway is set in a remote village where people make their living through farming. A couple working as farmers in the village get notice for eviction as a highway is being planned to be built, subsuming their small property of land. The wife decides to go to the capital city and meet the ministers in charge. She, being a poor farming laborer, faces many challenges in meeting the politician. But she ultimately meets him. Back to her native, she finds her land is gone, a highway built over it. She learns through her neighbors her husband died in poverty and the highway has passed across his grave. Greater tragedy lies when she learns that her daughter, out of destitution, has become a sex worker. Human nature of all the types has been well depicted across all characters. Hence, the movie calls for a humane approach towards development.

== Cast ==
- Shruti as Puttakka
- Prakash Rai as Shani Krishna
- Achyuth Kumar
- Mandya Ramesh
- Srinivas Prabhu
- Veena Sundar
- Sathish Ninasam as a farmer
- B. Suresha in a cameo appearance

== Reception ==
=== Critical response ===
A critic from The Times of India scored the film at 4 out of 5 stars and says "Hats off to Shruthi for her brilliant portrayal of Puttakka, a rustic woman. Equally good is Prakash Rai, who gives a comic touch to the narration as Shani Krishna. Achuth Kumar, Srinivasa Prabhu and Veena Sundar are brilliant. The real hero is H M Ramachandra, for his pleasing cinematography. Music by Hamsalekha has a desi touch". B S Srivani from Deccan Herald wrote "Veena Sundar’s performance raises expectations of more. Only the sensitive can sift through staid pace and performances to appreciate the sub-texts. But what about those who are not exposed to such realities?An honest effort no doubt, but Puttakkana Highway ultimately fails to bridge the urban-rural gap - a lost opportunity". Shruti Indira Lakshminarayana from Rediff.com scored the film at 3 out of 5 stars and says "Puttakkana Highway is a story that spans over 16 years, not to forget that there are no short cuts while fighting for justice! Watch Puttakana Highway to understand the other flip side of development". A critic from Bangalore Mirror wrote "It is rather a textbook effort at presenting serious questions ad answers. You know the answer and the fact that it is not the solution. A god ride, but it lacks a soul".

== Awards ==
- The movie won the National Film Award for Best Feature Film in Kannada for the year 2010–2011.
- Puttakkana Highway won an award in 4th Bengaluru International Film Festival 2011.
