= List of Kannada-language films =

This is an alphabetical list of the Kannada feature films released by the Kannada film Industry

== 0–9 ==
- 18th Cross (2012)
- 27 Mavalli Circle (1986)
- 1st Rank Raju (2015)
- No 73, Shanthi Nivasa (2007)
- 6-5=2 (2013)
- 8MM Bullet (2018)
- 777 Charlie (2022)
- 121# (2018)

== A ==
- Addhuri (2012)
- A (1998)
- A to Z (1998)
- A. K. 47 (1999)
- Aaru Mooru Ombhatthu (1970)
- Aacya
- Aadarshasathi (1955)
- Aadithya (1996)
- Aaganthuka (1987)
- Aaghaatha (1995)
- Aaha (1999)
- Aaha Brahmachari (1993)
- Aaha Nanna Maduveyanthe (1999)
- Aahuti (1985)
- Aakasmika (1993)
- Aakramana (2014)
- Aakrosha (1983)
- Aalemane (1981)
- Aanand (1986)
- Aananda Bhairavi (1983)
- Aananda Bhashpa
- Aananda Jyoti
- Aananda Kanda
- Aananda Sagara
- Aapathbandhava (1987)
- Apthamitra (2004)
- Aptharakshaka (2010)
- Aarada Gaaya (1980)
- Aaradhane (1984)
- Aarambha (1987)
- Aarambha (2015)
- Aase (1987)
- Aase Abhilashe
- Aase Pooraisu (1997)
- Aasegobba Meesegobba (1990)
- Aaseya Bale (1987)
- Aasha
- Aasha Jyothi
- Aasha Kirana
- Aasha Sundari (1960)
- Aashadaboothi (1955)
- Aasheervada
- Aasphota (1988)
- Aata Bombata (1990)
- Aata Hudugaata (1995)
- Aathanka (1993)
- Aathma Bandhana (1992)
- Aathma Shakthi (1978)
- Aavesha (1990)
- Abachurina Post Office (1973)
- Abale (1988)
- Abba aa Hudugi
- Abhi (2003)
- Abhijith (1993)
- Abhimana (1989)
- Abhimanyu (1990)
- Abhinethri (1999)
- Accident (1984)
- Accident (2008)
- Adalu Badalu (1979)
- Adda Dari (1968)
- Ade Hrudaya, Ade Mamathe
- Ade Kannu (1985)
- Ade Raga Ade Hadu (1989)
- Adhipati (1994)
- Adhipatra (2025)
- Adu (2003)
- Adjustment (1992)
- Adrushta Rekhe (1989)
- Adrushtavantha (1982)
- Africadalli Sheela (1986)
- After Breakup (2025)
- Aghora
- Agni Divya (1990)
- Agni IPS (1997)
- Agni Kanye
- Agni Panjara (1992)
- Agni Pareekshe
- Agni Parva
- Agni Sakshi
- Aidu Beralu
- Aishwarya (2006)
- Ajagajantara (1991)
- Ajay
- Ajay Vijay
- Ajeya (1985)
- Ajith (2014)
- Ajnathavasa (1984)
- Aakash (2005)
- Akhanda Bramhacharigalu
- Aleemayya
- Alexander
- Aliya Alla Magala Ganda
- Aliya devaru
- Aliya Geleya
- Aliya Mane Tholiya
- Allah Neene Neene Eshwara
- Alle Irodu Nodi
- Alli Ramachari Illi Brahmachari
- Aluku (1978)
- Amar Akbar Anthony
- Amara Bharathi
- Amara Jyothi
- Amara Madhura Prema
- Amara Prema
- Amarajeevi (1965)
- Amarashilpi Jakanachari (1964)
- Amarnath (1978)
- America America (1995)
- Amma (1968)
- Ammavara Ganda
- Amrutha Bindu
- Amrutha Dhare (2005)
- Amrutha Sindhu
- Amrutha Ghalige (1984)
- Amrutha Varshini (1997)
- Anamika (1987)
- Anatharu (2007)
- Anamadheya Ashok Kumar (2025)
- Anantha Prema (1990)
- Ananthana Avanthara (1989)
- Ananthara (1989)
- Anatha Rakshaka (1991)
- Andada Aramane (1982)
- Andaman (1998)
- Angaili Apsare (1993)
- Ani Ani
- Anireekshitha (1970)
- Anjada Gandu (1988)
- Anjada Gandu (2014)
- Anjani Putra (2017)
- Anna Andare Nammanna (1997)
- Anna Attige (1974)
- Anna Thamma (1968)
- Anna Thangi (2005)
- Annayya (1993)
- Annaji
- Annapoorna (1964)
- Annavara Makkalu
- Antha (1981)
- Antharala
- Amrutha Vani
- Anthargami
- Anthima Ghatta
- Anthima Theerpu
- Anthintha Gandu Nanalla
- Anubhava (1984)
- Anugraha (1971)
- Anukulakkobba Ganda
- Anupama
- Anuradha
- Anuraga Aralithu (1986)
- Anuraga Bandhana
- Anuraga Devathe
- Anuraga Sangama (1995)
- Anuraga Spandana (not released)
- Anuraga Swaradali Apaswara
- Anuragada Alegalu (1993)
- Anurakthe
- Anurupa
- Anveshane (1983)
- Aparadhi (1976)
- Aparadhi Nanalla
- Aparajithe
- Aparanji
- Aparichita (1978)
- Aparupada Kathe
- Aparupada Athithigalu
- Apurva Jodi
- Apoorva Sangama (1984)
- Apurva Samsara
- Appa Nanjappa Maga Gunjapa
- Appaji (1996)
- Appu (2002)
- April Fool (1997)
- Aptharakshaka (2010)
- Apurva Kanasu
- Aragini
- Aralida Hoovugalu (1991)
- Aranyadalli Abhimanyu (1991)
- Arishina Kunkuma
- Arasu (2007)
- Archana
- Ardhangini
- Arivu
- Arjun Abhimanyu
- Arrest Warrant
- Aruna Raaga (1986)
- Arunodaya (1968)
- Aryabhata (1999)
- Asadhya Aliya (1979)
- Asambhava (1986)
- Ashoka
- Ashoka Chakra
- Ashwamedha (1990)
- Atthege Thakka Sose
- Athi Madhura Anuraaga
- Athiratha Maharatha
- Atthegondu Kala, Sosegondu Kala
- Atthe Magalu
- Atithi
- Auto
- Auto Raja (1980)
- Auto Raja (2013)
- Auto Shankar
- Autograph Please
- Ava Lucky
- Avala Antaranga
- Avala Charithre
- Avala Hejje
- Avala Neralu
- Avale Nanna Gelathi
- Avale Nanna Hendti
- Avale Nanna Hudugi (1999)
- Avali Javali
- Avane Nanna Ganda
- Avane Srimannarayana (2018–19)
- Avasthe
- Avathara Purusha
- Ayogya (2018)
- Ayudha
- Ayyappa Sharanu
- Aa Karaala Ratri
- Ammachi Yemba Nenapu
- Ambi Ning Vayassaytho
- Amma I Love You
- Ananthu vs Nusrath

== B ==
- Bahaddur
- Bharjari
- Ba nalle Madhuchandrake
- Ba Nanna Preethisu
- Baageerathi
- Babruvaahana (1977)
- Baadada Hoovu
- Badavara Bandhu (1976)
- Baddi Bangaramma
- Baduku Bangaravayithu
- Baduku Jataka bandi
- Badukuva Dari
- Bhagyada Belaku
- Bahaddur Gandu
- Bahaddur Hennu
- Baktha Kanakadasa
- Baala Bandhana
- Baala Nagamma
- Baala Nowke
- Baala Panjara
- Baalarajana Kathe
- Badmash
- Bhale Basava
- Bhale Bhatta
- Baale Bhaskar
- Bhale Hombale
- Bhale Huccha
- Bhale Huduga
- Bhale Jodi (1970)
- Bhale Keshava
- Bhale Kiladi
- Bhale Raja
- Bhale Rani
- Baalida Mane
- Baalina Daari
- Baalina Guri
- Baalina Jyothi
- Bal Nanmaga
- Baalondu Bhavageete
- Baalondu Chaduranga
- Baalondu Uyyale
- Balu Aparupa Nam Jodi
- Baalu Bangara
- Baalu Belagithu
- Baalu Jenu
- Baaluve Ninagagi
- Banashankari
- Bandha mukta
- Bhanda Nanna Ganda
- Bandhana
- Bandhavya
- Bangalore Bandh
- Bangalore Bhuta
- Bangalore Mail
- Bangalore Rathriyalli
- Bangarada Baduku
- Bangarada Gudi
- Bangarada Hoovu
- Bangarada Jinke
- Bangarada Kalasha
- Bangarada Kalla
- Bangarada Mane (1981)
- Bangarada Mane (1996)
- Bangarada Manushya
- Bangarada Panjara
- Bangaradantha Maga
- Bangari (2013)
- Banker Margayya
- Bannada Gejje
- Bannada Hejje
- Bannada Vesha
- Banni Ondsala Nodi
- Bara
- Baare Nanna Muddina Rani
- Baaro Nanna Muddina Krishna
- Bhavya Bharatha
- Bayalu Daari
- Bayalu Deepa
- Bhayankara Bhasmasura
- Bayasade Banda Bhagya
- Bazaar Bheema
- Bhajarangi
- Bhajarangi 2
- Beda Krishna Ranginata
- Bedara Kannappa
- Bedaru Bombe
- Bedi
- Bedi Bandavalu
- Beedi Basavanna
- Beegara Pandya
- Beesida Bale
- Bekkina Kannu
- Beladingala Baale
- Belli Belaku
- Belli Kalungura
- Belli Modagalu
- Belli Naga
- Belli Moda
- Belliyappa Bangarappa
- Beluvalada Madilalli
- Benki
- Benki Birugali (2013)
- Benki chendu
- Benkiya Bale
- Benkiyalli Aralida Hoovu
- Beralge Koral
- Beretha Jeeva
- Beru
- Besuge
- Bethala Gudda
- Bete (1986)
- Betegaara
- Bettada Bhairava
- Bettada Huli
- Bettada Hoovu
- Bettada Kalla
- Bettada Thayi
- Bethale Seve
- Bevu Bella (1963)
- Bevu Bella (1993)
- Bhagyavantharu
- Bhadrakali
- Bhagvan Shree Saibaba
- Bhagyachakra
- Bhagyada Lakshmi Baramma
- Bhagyadevathe
- Bhagyada Baagilu
- Bhagyajyothi
- Bhagyavantha
- Bhairava
- Bhairavi
- Bhakta Prahlada
- Bhaktha Dhruva
- Bhaktha Jnanadeva
- Bhaktha Kumbara (1949)
- Bhaktha Kumbara (1974)
- Bhaktha Mallikarjuna
- Bhaktha Markandeya
- Bhaktha Prahlada
- Bhaktha Ramadas
- Bhaktha Siriyala
- Bhaktha Vijaya
- Bhakta Chetha
- Bhaktha Prahlada
- Bhale Adrushtavo Adrustha
- Bhale Chatura
- Bhama Sathyabhama
- Bhanda Alla Bhadur
- Bharatha Rathna
- Bharath
- Bharatha Nari 2000
- Bharathi
- Bharavase
- Baari Bharjari Bete
- Bharjari Gandu
- Bhavaani
- Bhagyodaya
- Bhootayyana Maga Ayyu
- Bhu Thayi Makkalu
- Bhujangaiana Dashavatara
- Bhukailasa
- Bhulokadalli Yamaraja
- Bhudana
- Bhumi Thayane
- Bhumi Thayiya Chochila Maga
- Bhumige Banda Bhagavanta
- Bhumigeetha
- Bhupathi
- Bhupathi Ranga
- Bhuvana Jyothi
- Bhuvanam Gaganam
- Bhuvaneshwari
- Bidisada Banda
- Bidugade
- Bidugadeya Bedi
- Bili Gulabi
- Bili Hendthi
- Biligiriya Banadalli
- Bindaas
- Bisi Bisi
- Bisi Raktha
- Bisilu Beladingalu
- Black Market
- Bombay Halva
- Bombat Hendthi
- Bombatt Huduga
- Bombatt Raja Bandal Rani
- Bombay Dada
- Bombaat
- Bombugalu sar bombugalu
- Boregowda Bangalorige Banda
- Boss
- Brahmagantu
- Bell Bottom
- Brahmastra
- Bramha Vishnu Maheshwara
- Brindavana
- Broker Bheeshmachari
- Bruna
- Budi Muchida kenda
- Buddhivantha
- Bhairava Geetha

== C ==
- C.B.I. Durga
- C.B.I. Shankar
- C.B.I. Shiva
- C.B.I. Vijay
- CID 72
- CID Rajanna
- Captain
- Central Jail
- Central Rowdi
- Chaduranga (1969)
- Chaduranga (1985)
- Chadurida Chithragalu
- Chaithrada Chiguru
- Chaithrada Premanjali
- Chakratheertha
- Chakravarthy
- Chakravyuha
- Chalagara
- Chalisada Sagara
- Chalisuva Modagalu
- Challenge
- Challenge Gopalakrishna
- Chamkayisi Chindiudaysi
- Chamathkara
- Chamundeshwari Mahime
- Chanakya
- Chanchala Kumari
- Chanchala
- Chandamarutha
- Chandanada gombe
- Chandavalliya Thota
- Chandi Chamundi
- Chandrahasa (1947)
- Chandrahasa (1965)
- Chandrakumara
- Chandramuki Pranasakhi
- Chandrodaya
- Chanundeshwari Puja Mahime
- Chapala Chennigaraya
- Chappale
- Chowkada Deepa
- Chaya
- Chellida Rakta
- Cheluva
- Cheluvina Chittara
- Chennappa Channegowda
- Chikka
- Chikkamma
- Chikkejamanru
- Chinna
- Chinna Nee Nagutiru
- Chinna Ninna Muddaduve
- Chinnada Gombe
- Chinnadanta Maga
- Chinnari Mutta
- Chinnari Puttanna
- Chingari (2012)
- Chinthamani
- Chira Bandavya
- [Chiranjeevi (1936)
- Chiranjeevi (1976)
- Chiranjeevi Sudhakara (1988)
- Chiranjeevi Raje Gowda
- Chithegu Chinte
- Chithralekha
- Chomana Dudi
- Chora Chita Chora
- Chora Guru Chandala Sishya
- Choo Mantar
- Chu Bana
- Chukki Chandrama
- Churi Chikkanna
- Circle Inspector
- Cowboy Kulla
- College Hero
- Crime
- Chandana Chiguru
- Chithrakuta-Kalyankumar (not released)
- Chelvi
- Chigurida kanasu
- Chandra Chakori
- Cheluve Ondu Heltheeni
- Cheluvina Chittara
- Chanda

== D ==
- Darode
- Dada
- Daha
- Daiva Leela
- Daivashakti
- Dakshayini
- Dakota Express
- Dakota picture
- Dalalli
- Dalavayi
- Dampathiyaru
- Dampatiyaru
- Dance Raja Dance
- Dange Edda Makkalu
- Dara
- Dharani Mandala Madhyadolage
- Dari Tappida Maga
- Darmapathni
- Darmayudda
- Dasara
- Dashavathaara
- Dava Dava
- Dayadi
- Daiva Sankalpa
- December 31
- Deepa
- Deergha Sumangali
- Deva
- Deva Manava
- Devadasi
- Deva kannikaa
- Devalaya
- Devara Aata
- Devara Duddu
- Devara Gedda Manava
- Devara Gudi
- Devara Makkalu
- Devara Mane
- Devara Teerpu
- Devara kannu
- Devare Dikku
- Devaru Kotta Tangi
- Devaru Kotta Vara
- Deva Sundari
- Devata Manushya
- Devate
- Dhairya
- Dhairya Lakshmi
- Dhana Pishachi
- Dhanalakshmi
- Dhani
- Dharma
- Dharma Dari Tappitu
- Dharma Pathni
- Dharma Peeta
- Dharma Vijaya
- Dharmasere
- Dharmatma
- Dia
- Divangatha Manjunathana Geleyaru
- Digvijaya
- Doddamane Estate
- Dombara Krishna
- Doni Saagali
- Doomakethu
- Doorada Betta
- Dore
- Dr. Krishna
- Driver Hanumantu
- Drona
- Druvathaare
- Drushya
- Dudde Doddappa
- Durga Puje
- Durga Shakthi
- Durgashtami
- Duniya
- Devara Maga
- Dange (not released)
- Dweepa
- Dada Serada Doni (Shreedhar, Madhuri; not released)
- Dharmasthala Mahathme
- Dasha

== E ==
- Edakallu Guddada Mele
- Eddide Gaddala
- Edeyuru Siddalingeshwara Mahatme
- Edurumane Meena
- Ee Bandha Anubandha
- Ee Hrudhaya Ninagagi
- Ee Preethi Eke Bhumi Melide
- Ee Jeeva Ninagagi
- Ekalavya
- Ella Hanakkagi
- Ella Hengasarinda
- Ellaranthalla Nanna Ganda
- Ellellu Naane
- Ellindalo Bandavaru
- Elu Suttina Kote
- Emergency
- En Swamy Aliyandire
- Endu Ninnavane
- Ene Barali Preeti Irali
- Entede Banta
- Enundre
- Eradu Hrudayagalu
- Eradu Kanasu (1974)
- Eradu Kanasu (2017)
- Eradu Mukha
- Eradu Nakshatragalu
- Eradu Rekhegalu
- Eshwar
- Etu Ediretu
- Edurmaneli Ganda Pakkadmaneli Hendthi
- Eno Moha Eko Daha
- Excuse Me (2003)
- Ee Sambashane

== F ==
- Forest

== G ==
- Galige
- Gaali Gopura
- Gaali Maathu
- Gaalipata
- Gajarama
- Gana
- Ganda Berunda
- Ganda Hendathi
- Ganda Mane Makkalu
- Gandandre Gandu
- Gandanige Thakka Hendathi
- Gandharva
- Gandharvagiri
- Gandharva Kanye
- Gandede Bhaira
- Gandhada Gudi
- Gandhada Gudi Part 2
- Gandhi Nagara
- Gandondu Hennaru
- Gandu Guligalu
- Gandu Sidigundu
- Gandugali
- Gandugali kumararama
- Ganesha I Love You
- Ganesha Mahime
- Ganeshana Galaate
- Ganeshana Maduve
- Ganesha Subramanya
- Ganga
- Ganga Yamuna
- Gange Bare Tunge Bare
- Gange Gowri
- Garuda
- Garuda Rekhe
- Garuda Dhwaja
- Gayatri Maduve
- Gedda Maga
- Geddavalu Nane
- Geejagana Goodu
- Geetha
- Gejje Nada
- Gejje Puje
- Geluvina Saradara
- Geluvu Nannade
- Gharjane
- Gharshane
- Ghatashradhdha
- Giddu Dada
- Gili Bete
- Giri Bale
- Giri Kanye
- Giri Mallige
- God Father
- Gold Medal
- Golibar
- Golmal Part 2
- Golmal Radhakrishna
- Gooli
- Googly
- Gopi Kalyana
- Govadalli CID 999
- Government
- Gowramma
- Gowri
- Gowri Ganda
- Gowri Ganesha
- Gowri Kalyana
- Gowri Shankara
- Grahana
- Grihalakshmi (1969)
- Grihalakshmi (1992)
- Grihini
- Griha Pravesha
- Gudugu Sidilu
- Gulabi Talkies
- Guna Nodi Hennu Kodi
- Gunasagari
- Jathaka Rathna Gunda Joisa
- Goonda Mathu Police
- Goonda Rajya
- Goondaguru
- Gundana Madve
- Guri
- Guru (1989)
- Guru Jagadguru
- Guru Shishyaru (1981)
- Guru bhakti
- Guru-Bramha
- Gaja
- Ganda Hendathi & Boy Friend
- Gopi
- Gandugali Rama
- Gangavva Ganagmayi-Ananth Nag (not released)
- Gattimela
- Gatti Thali Bitti Mela
- Gajendra
- Gajapathi Garvabhanga
- Gaajina Mane
- Gaalimathu
- Govinda Gopala
- Gunna
- Guru Sarvabhowma Shree Raghavendra Karune
- Gaaya
- Guns and Roses

== H ==
- Huliraaya
- Hatavaadi
- Hubli
- Hudugata
- Hagalu Vesha
- Haalu Jenu
- Halli Meshtru
- Hamsageethe
- Hanthakana Sanchu (1980)
- Haseena
- Haavina Hede
- Hebbuli
- Hello Daddy
- Hrudaya Hadithu
- Huliya Haalina Mevu
- Hucha
- Huchana Maduveyalli Undavane Janna
- H2O (2002)
- Haalu Sakkare
- Hudugatada Hudugi
- Hudugigagi
- Halli Haida
- Halliya Surasuraru
- Halliyadarenu Shiva
- Hidambi Halli Pravesha
- Hanthaka
- Hanthakana Sanchu
- Haavina Hejje
- Haavada Hoovu
- Haavu Eniyata
- Hello Doctor (Sex)
- Hello Narada
- Hello Sister
- Hello Yama
- Hello
- Hrudaya Sangama
- Hrudaya Bandhana
- Hrudaya Deepa
- Hrudaya Pallavi
- Hrudaya Raga
- Hrudaya Hrudaya
- Hrudaya Kallaru
- Hrudayavantha
- Hrudaya Geethe
- Huliya (k.v.raju)
- Huli Banthu Huli
- Huli Hebbuli
- Huliyada Kala
- Hasida Hebbuli
- Hasiru Thorana
- Hasiru Gajina Bale (Sithara; not released)
- Hoysala
- Hathura Odeya
- Hombisilu
- Honey Moon
- Hunnimeya Rathriyalli
- High Command
- Hongkongnalli Agent Amar (Ambarish, Sumalatha)
- Hongirana
- Hosavarsha
- Hosa Baduku (Ramakrishna, Ramkumar, Bhavya; not released)
- Hosa Balu
- Hubli
- Hosa Jeevana
- Hosa Love Story
- Hosa Madam
- Hosa Kavya
- Hosa Belaku
- Hosa Raga
- Hosa Kalla Hale Kulla
- Hosa Ithihasa
- Hosa Neeru
- Hosa Mane Aliya
- Haalappa
- Hoovondu Beku Ballige
- Hoovu Mullu
- Hoovu Hannu
- Hoo Bisilu
- Himapatha
- Hubballi
- Harish Jyoti Love Store (2011)

== I ==
- Indina Ramayana
- Indrajith
- Inspector Vikram
- Inspector Jayasimha
- Inspector Kranthikumar
- Inspector Jhansy
- Indrana gedda Narendra
- Indra Dhanush
- Indina Bharatha
- Ide Maha Sudina
- Iduve Jeevana
- Idu Sadhya
- Idu Entha Premavayya
- Ivalentha Hendthi
- Indra

== J ==
- Jackie
- Jayasimha
- Jaana
- Jedara Bale
- Jeeboomba
- Jeevana Chaitra
- Jogi
- Jogayya
- Jootata
- Jokefalls
- Jaga Mecchida Maga
- Janumadha Jodi
- JodiHakki
- Jwalamukhi
- Jethendra
- Jenina Holle
- Junglee
- Januma Janumada Anubhanda
- Jaala
- Jodi
- Jamindaru (2002)
- Jugari
- Jeerjimbe
- Jagath Kiladi

== K ==
- Kantara (film)
- Kotigobba 2
- K.G.F: Chapter 1
- K.G.F: Chapter 2
- Kaaranji (2009)
- Kariya (2003)
- Kariya 2 (2016)
- Kallarali Hoovagi
- Kaadu
- Kaakana Kote
- Kaanuru Heggadathi
- Kadamba
- Kampana
- Kanna Muchhe Kaade Goode
- Kanneshwara Rama
- Kannu Theredu Nodu
- Kalaasipalya
- Kalla Kulla
- Kaaleju Ranga
- Kasturi Nivasa
- Katpadi Junction
- Katera
- Kavirathna Kalidasa
- Kiladi Jodi
- Kirik Party
- Kittu Puttu
- Kulla Agent 000
- Kallarali Hoovagi
- Kulavadhu
- ku..ku...
- Kallaraalihuvagi
- Karulinakare
- Karulina kugu
- Kadahana
- Kavya
- Kaveri
- Kudremukha
- Kotigobba
- Kotreshi Kanasu
- Krishna
- Kankambari
- Kula Gaurava (1971)
- Katheyondu Shuruvagide
- Kannadakkagi Ondannu Otti
- Kempegowda (2011)
- Kotigobba 3 (2021)
- Kousalya Supraja Rama (2023)
- KD - The Devil (2023)
- Kaatera (2023)

== L ==
- Laali
- Laali Hadu
- Lagna Patrike
- Lankesh Patrike (film)
- Lifu estene
- Lion Jagapati Rao
- LOVE
- Love Guru
- Love Madi Nodu
- Love Training
- Lankesh
- Lift Kodla
- Law and Order
- Lock up Death
- Love Mocktail
- Love you
- Love you aliya
- lava kusha
- Laila majnu

== M ==
- Mussanje Maathu
- Manaroopa
- Mahaa Prachandaru
- Malaya Marutha
- Maleyali Jotheyali
- Mana Mechida Madaadhi
- Manasa Sarovara
- Mane Mane Kathe
- Mangala Muhurtha
- Mangalya Bhagya
- Masanada Makkalu (2005)
- Mareyada Haadu
- Masti
- Mathadana
- Mata
- Mayor Muthanna
- Miss California
- Mayura
- Milana
- Minchina Ota
- Minchina Ota
- Mojina Maduve
- Mooruvare Vajragalu
- Muddhina Maava
- Muthina Haara
- Muthu Ondhu Muthu
- My Autograph
- Mane Mane Ramayana
- Mungaru Male
- Mungaru Male 2
- Muniyana Maadari
- Munnudi
- My Dear Tiger
- Manamechida hudugi
- maavanige takka aliya
- Mruthyunjaya
- modada mareyalli
- Muthanna
- Maathaad Maathaadu Mallige
- Masth Maja Madi
- Mahakshatriya
- Maaleeyalli Joteyalli

== N ==
- Nagamandala
- Naarada Vijaya
- Naagarahaavu
- Nagarahole
- Naa Ninna Bidalare
- Naa Ninna Mareyalare
- Naanu Nanna Hendthi
- Nanna kanasina hoove
- Nanna Preethiya Hudugi
- Nanobba Kalla
- Narada Vijaya
- Nayaka
- Ninagaagi Naanu
- Nagarahavu (Upendra)
- Naniruvudeninagagi
- Nannaseya Hoove
- Namma Samsara
- Nammoora Huduga
- Nammoora Mandara Hoove
- Namma Makkalu
- Nanna Rosha Nooru Varusha
- Naobba Kalla
- Naa Mechchida Huduga
- Ninagaagi
- Ninagoskara
- Nammoora Raja
- Nanjundi Kalyana
- Nanjunda Nakkaga
- Naguva Hoovu
- Nan Hendthi Maduve
- Nammoora Devathe
- Nagakanye
- Nagapooja
- Nagadevathe
- New Delhi
- Nimagondu Sihi Suddi
- Nodi Swamy Navirodu Hige
- Nodidavaru Enanthare
- Nyaya Ellide
- Nyayave Devaru
- Nage Habba
- Nenapirali
- Neelakantha
- Neenu Nakkare Haalu Sakkare
- Neelambari
- Nathicharami
- Nilukada Nakshatra
- Naduve Antaravirali
- Nimma Vasthugalige Neeve Javaabdaararu

== O ==
- Octopus (Kannada)
- Oda Huttidavaru
- Oda Huttidavalu
- Ohileshwara
- Olavu Mudidaaga
- Om
- Ondaanondu Kaaladalli
- Onde Balliya Hoogalu
- Ondu Muttina Kathe
- Operation Diamond Racket
- Operation Alamellama
- Operation Antha
- Ondagona Baa
- Oda Huttidavaru
- Onde Ondu Sari
- Ondu Oorina Kathe
- Ondu Premada Kathe
- Ondu Preethiya Kathe
- Ondu Cinema Kathe
- Om Namahshivaya
- Om Ganesh
- Omkara
- Onde Raktha
- Onde Guri
- Onde Rupa Eradu Guna
- Operation Jackpot CID 999
- Orata I Love You
- Obbarigintha Obbaru
- Ondu SHaleya Kathe

P

- Pogaru
- Phaniyamma
- Paramatma
- Pujaari
- Puja
- Post master
- Prathidwani
- Praya Praya Praya
- PremaGrantha
- Premada Kanike
- Preethi Prema Pranaya
- Pushpaka Vimana (1987)
- Pushpaka Vimana (2016)
- Premaloka
- Putani Agent 123
- prema Tharanga
- Paropakari
- Prana
- Premachari
- Paduvarahalli Pandavaru
- Parasangada Gendethimma
- Pujaphala
- Praja Prabhuthwa
- Prajashakthi
- Palitamsha

== R ==
- Ricky
- Raaj the Showman
- Raja Nanna Raja
- Raam
- Rahasya Ratri
- Rahasya
- Rajaratha
- Rakta Kanneeru
- Rana Ranga
- Ranganayaki
- RangiTaranga
- Rashmi
- Ramachari
- Rama Lakshmana
- Rama Shama bhama
- Ranadheera
- Ranadheera Kanteerava
- Ravi Chandra
- Ravimama
- Rathnagiri Rahasya
- Rowdy Ranganna
- Rayaru Bandaru Mavana Manege
- Rishi
- Road Romeo
- Romeo
- Rama Rama Re...
- Rambo
- Rambo2
- Raja Narasimha
- Rustum
- Rupayi raja
- Rani Maharani
- Readymade Ganda
- Rajani
- Ranganna
- Rama Krishna
- Rasika
- Ravi Shastri
- Rajakumari
- Ranga (S.S.L.C)
- Ranna
- Rocky
- Rajadhani
- Ring Road
- Rose
- Rudra Tandava
- Rocket
- Royal
- Rana Vikrama
- Rudra Garuda Purana
- Run Antony
- Ravanapura

== S ==
- Sarkari Hiriya Praathamika Shaale, Kasaragodu, Koduge: Ramanna Rai
- Sakshatkara
- Samayadha Gombe
- Sampattige Saval
- Samskara
- Samyuktha
- Sanaadi Appanna
- Sandhya Raga
- Satya Harishchandra
- Sanju Weds Geetha 2
- Savari
- School Master
- Seetharamu
- Seetha
- Seizer
- Server Somanna
- Shankha nada
- Sharapanjara
- Shastri
- Sandeep Malani Sandesha SMS 6260
- Shankar Guru
- Shubhamangala
- Sipayi Ramu
- Snehitara Saval
- Sose Thanda Sowbhagya
- Sri Krishnadevaraya
- Srimantana Magalu
- Subba Shasthri
- Sukha Samsarakke Hanneredu Suthragalu
- Sipaay Raamu
- Sirivantha
- Sixer
- Sogasugaara
- Shisya
- Simhada Mari Sainya
- Simhada Mari
- Simhadriya Simha
- Salinga kami Darshan
- Shabari Male Swami Ayappa
- Shruthi
- Swamy
- Suligaali
- Suryakanthi
- Singapurinalli Raja Kulla
- Sipaayi
- Saarathi
- Snehitaru
- School Boy
- Super
- Super Ranga
- Stabiliti
- Sakath
- Sapta Saagaradaache Ello- Side A (2023)
- Shakhahaari
- Sweccha
- Sidlingu 2

== T ==
- Tagaru
- Tabarana Kathe
- Tarka
- Tarle nannamaga
- Thaayi Saheba (1997)
- Thaakath
- Thayige Thakkha Maga
- The Villain (2018)
- Tiger padmini
- Tabbalyu Ninaade Magane
- Teddy Bear
- Tirupathi
- Trimurthi
- Tuvvi Tuvvi Tuvvi
- Tutthuri
- Tananum Tananum
- Thavarige Baa Thangi
- Tootu Madike
- Thavarina siri (2006)
- Thayiya Madilu (2007)
- Tutta Mutta
- Tuntata
- Tunta
- Tarak

== U ==
- Upaasane
- Upendra (1999)
- Udupi Krishna
- Uyyaale
- Uppi Dada M.B.B.S. (2008)
- Usire 2001
- Ugaadhi
- Ullasa Utsaha (2009)
- ugramm (2014)
- Uppi 2
- Udumba (2018)
- Ulidavaru Kandante
- Uddishya

== V ==
- Vajrakaya
- Vamshavruksha (1971)
- Vamshakobba
- Vasantha geetha
- Vasantha Lakshmi
- Vasantha Purnima
- Vasantha Kavya
- Vasantha Nilaya
- Vasantha Kala
- Varna Chakra
- Vamshi (2008)
- Veera Kannadiga (2004)
- Valmiki
- Veerappa nayaka
- Veera Parampare
- Varadhanayaka
- Veera Madakari
- Vaalee
- Victory
- Vikrant Rona (2022)
- Vishnu Priya (2025)

== X ==
- Xandu

== Y ==
- Y2K (2004)
- Yaaradhu
- Yaardo Duddu Ellammana Jathre (2003)
- Yaare Nee Abhimani (2000)
- Yaare Neenu Cheluve (1998)
- Yaarige Saluthe Sambala (2000)
- Yaarivanu
- Yaaru (1996)
- Yahoo (2004)
- Yarivalu (2000)
- Yamakinkara (1995)
- Yamalokadalli Veerappan (1998)
- Yaara Sakshi? (1972)
- Yaarigu Helbedi (1994)
- Yaarivanu? (1984)
- Yaaru hithavaru (1976)
- Yaava huvu yara mudigo (1981)
- Yaava Janmada Maitri (1972)
- Yowanada Sulliyalli (1985)
- Yowvanada Holeyalli (1999)
- Yashwanth (2005)
- Yowanada Anubhava (1993)
- Youvana (2004)
- Yudha Mattu Swatantrya (2002)
- Yudhakanda (1989)
- Yuddha (1997)
- Yudhaparva (1991)
- Yuga Purusha (1989)
- Yuva Shakthi (1997)
- Yuvaraja (2001)
- Yuvarathnaa (2021)
- Yaksha (2010)
- Yodha (2009)
- Yajamana
- Yajamana (2019)

== Z ==
- Z (1999)
- Zabardust (2005)
- Zamana (2010)
- Zindabad (1997)
- Zamindara (2000)
- Zoom (2016)

== See also ==
- Kannada cinema
- Media in Karnataka
- List of Kannada-language children's films
- List of Kannada-language magazines
- List of Kannada-language newspapers
- List of Kannada-language radio stations
- List of Kannada-language television channels
- List of Indian films
