= Pyar Jhukta Nahin =

1985 film

- Poster
- Directed by: Vijay Sadanah
- Written by: S.H. Bihari; Partho Mukerjee; Amir Shamji
- Produced by: K.C. Bokadia
- Starring: Mithun Chakraborty; Padmini Kolhapure; Danny Denzongpa
- Cinematography: S.L. Sharma
- Edited by: Govind Dalwadi
- Music by: Laxmikant–Pyarelal; S.H. Bihari (lyrics)
- Production company: BMB Productions
- Distributed by: Gemini Pictures
- Release date: 11 January 1985
- Running time: 135 min
- Country: India
- Language: Hindi

'Pyar Jhukta Nahin (transl. Love Does not Bow Down) is a 1985 Indian Hindi-language romantic drama film directed by Vijay Sadanah. It is a remake of the 1977 Pakistani film Aina. The film stars Mithun Chakraborty, Padmini Kolhapure, and Danny Denzongpa. Laxmikant–Pyarelal were nominated for Best Music Director. It was a blockbuster at the box office, earning ₹ 4.5 crore with a production budget of less than 50 lakh. Laxmikant–Pyarelal were nominated for Best Music Director. It was a blockbuster at the box office, earning ₹ 4.5 crore with a production budget of less than 50 lakh.

The film is inspired by the 1973 film Aa Gale Lag Jaa. It was remade in Kannada as Nee Bareda Kadambari with Vishnuvardhan and Bhavya in the lead. It was also remade in Tamil with Rajnikanth as Naan Adimai Illai co-starring Sridevi. Both remakes were directed by Dwarakish. The film was also remade in Telugu as Pachani Kapuram again starring Krishna and Sridevi. Bimal Roy Jr. adapted the film in Bengali in 1989 as Aamar Tumi starring Prosenjit Chatterjee and Farah Naaz. Basant Naik adapted the film in Odia in 1995 as To Kola Mo Jhulna starring Siddhant Mohapatra and Rachana Banerjee.

== Synopsis ==
Preeti (Padmini Kolhapure) is a rich girl who falls in love with a middle class photographer Ajay (Mithun Chakraborty). Her parents initially disagree for the marriage but the daughter manages to make them ready for the marriage. They propose Ajay to become their ghar jamai to which he refuses. Preeti's father Bhanu (Danny Dengzongpa) makes Ajay a top class photographer and his salary gets an increment. Later Ajay discovers that Bhanu has made his promotion and this has hurt his self-respect. Preeti and Ajay separate.

Although Preeti and Ajay both still love each other, Bhanu makes them have a divorce due to misunderstandings caused by him – Bhanu makes Ajay believe Preeti wants a divorce and vice versa. Preeti is then found to be pregnant with Ajay's child. Bhanu does not tell this to Ajay, and instead takes Preeti to the mountains (Shimla) for the delivery so that nobody finds that she gave birth to a baby. There in the hospital, Bhanu meets Ajay and tells him about the baby. Bhanu agrees to give the baby to Ajay on the basis that Ajay never approach Preeti again, as she wants a new life with a new man. Ajay agrees, but Bhanu later changes his mind and gives the baby to an orphanage. However, Ajay follows him there and takes his own baby from the orphanage.

The story moves forward for some years and Preeti does not believe that her baby is dead, slowly losing her mental stability as a result. She carries a doll child in her arms, believing it to be her own son. Her parents get increasingly worried as a result. However, Preeti shows some improvement when she sees a photograph which she clicked in Shimla when she was with Ajay. The parents take her back to Shimla as a result. Ajay lives in Shimla and has brought up his child on his own. In a chance occurrence, the child meets Preeti and there is a connection between the two – with the help of Ajay, he later identifies her as his mother. He returns to her and brings her to Ajay and they solve their misunderstandings. The two expose the misunderstandings in their minds caused by Bhanu. They are able to reconcile and express their love for one another and live happily thereafter with their child.

== Cast ==
- Mithun Chakraborty as Ajay Khanna
- Padmini Kolhapure as Preeti
- Danny Denzongpa as Bhanupratap
- Bindu as Kamini
- Master Vicky as Vicky Khanna
- Madhu Malini as Mala Mathur
- Sudha Chopra as Kamini's Sister
- Vikas Anand as Police Inspector Mohan Anand
- Pinchoo Kapoor as Dwarka Prasad
- Manmohan Krishna as Mr. Mathur
- Roopesh Kumar as Rohit Prasad
- Chaman Puri as Shankar
- Asrani as Jackie

== Awards and nominations ==
33rd Filmfare Awards:

Nominated

- Best Actress – Padmini Kolhapure
- Best Music Director – Laxmikant Pyarelal
- Best Male Playback Singer – Shabbir Kumar for "Tumse Milkar Na Jaane"
- Best Female Playback Singer – Kavita Krishnamurthy for "Tumse Milkar Na Jaane"

== Soundtrack ==
| # | Title | Singer(s) | Raga |
|---|---|---|---|
| 1 | "Chahe Lakh Toofan Ayen" | Lata Mangeshkar, Shabbir Kumar, Laxmikant | |
| 2 | "Tumse Milkar Na Jane" (I) | Lata Mangeshkar, Shabbir Kumar | Shivaranjani |
| 3 | "Ho Dilbar Janiya" | Lata Mangeshkar | |
| 2 | "Tumhein Apna Sathi Banane Se Pehle" | Lata Mangeshkar, Shabbir Kumar, Anuradha Paudwal | |
| 5 | "Tumse Milkar Na Jane" (II) | Shabbir Kumar | Shivaranjani |
| 6 | "Tumse Milkar Na Jane" (III) | Kavita Krishnamurthy | Shivaranjani |
