= Nee Thanda Kanike =

- Title card
- Directed by: Dwarakish
- Written by: Chi. Udaya Shankar (dialogues)
- Screenplay by: Dwarakish
- Story by: Prakash Mehra
- Based on: Sharaabi (Hindi) (1984)
- Produced by: Dwarakish
- Starring: Vishnuvardhan; Girish Karnad; Jayasudha; C. R. Simha
- Cinematography: R. Deviprasad
- Edited by: Goutham Raj
- Music by: Vijay Anand
- Production company: Dwarakish Chithra
- Release date: 24 December 1985
- Running time: 132 min
- Country: India
- Language: Kannada

Nee Thanda Kanike (transl. The Gift You Bought) is a 1985 Indian Kannada-language film, directed and produced by Dwarakish. The film stars Vishnuvardhan, Girish Karnad, Jayasudha and C. R. Simha. It is a remake of the Hindi film Sharaabi, (1984), which itself was loosely based on the 1981 American film Arthur.

== Cast ==
- Vishnuvardhan as Ravi
- Girish Karnad
- Jayasudha as Meena
- C. R. Simha
- Sathish
- Vadiraj
- Sudheer
- Mysore Lokesh
- Shani Mahadevappa

== Soundtrack ==
All the songs composed by Vijay Anand and written by R. N. Jayagopal.

Track listing
No.	Title	Singer(s)	Length
1.	"Eno Ondu Hosa Jeevavu"	Vani Jairam, S. P. Balasubrahmanyam
2.	"Nee Needida Maathu Sullenu"	S. P. Balasubrahmanyam, Usha Ganesh
3.	"Kannalli Preethi"	B. R. Chaya
4.	"Kannalli Preethi"	S. P. Balasubrahmanyam, B. R. Chaya
5.	"Balemba Veeneyalli"	S. P. Balasubrahmanyam

== Release ==
Dwarakish noted that, unlike his other film Nee Bareda Kadambari, he put in a lot of effort in making Nee Thanda Kanike; however, unlike the former, the film was a box office failure. Vishnuvardhan reportedly told a senior journalist that Dwarakish was not a trustworthy person.
