= Naan Adimai Illai =

- Theatrical release poster
- Directed by: Dwarakish
- Written by: A. L. Narayanan (dialogues)
- Screenplay by: Dwarakish
- Based on: Pyar Jhukta Nahin by Vijay Sadanah
- Produced by: Dwarakish
- Starring: Rajinikanth; Sridevi
- Cinematography: Devi Prasad
- Edited by: Gauthamraj
- Music by: Vijay Anand
- Production company: Dwarakish Chithra
- Release date: 1 March 1986
- Running time: 145 minutes
- Country: India
- Language: Tamil

Naan Adimai Illai (transl. I am not a slave) is a 1986 Indian Tamil-language romantic drama film produced and directed by Dwarakish. The film stars Rajinikanth and Sridevi. A remake of the Hindi film Pyar Jhukta Nahin (1985), this was the last Tamil film for Sridevi in 1980s who then concentrated on her Bollywood career, though she would later return to Tamil cinema in the 2010s. Naan Adimai Illai was released on 1 March 1986, and became a box office failure.

== Plot ==
Vijay is a professional photographer from a middle-class background, who falls in love with a rich girl, Priya, whose father is Rajasekhar, a class-conscious man. They are stubborn in their love and marry against her parents' wishes. But soon the marriage is on the rocks due to the difference in their backgrounds, with the wily Rajasekhar playing his cards very well to split his daughter up from Vijay. They have a fight and Priya goes back to her parents' house and Rajasekhar coerces her to file for divorce from Vijay. After a few days, Priya visits the doctor for a stomach-ache and learns that she is pregnant. An elated Priya is ready to mend fences with Vijay and wants to tell him the news, but is blocked by her dad who has fixed her remarriage with someone else. She gives her dad the slip and goes to Vijay's house, just to find out that he has vacated the place recently.

Later Vijay is in a hospital to visit his friend and Priya is brought to the same hospital with labour pains. Vijay is thrilled and tries to talk to Priya, but Rajasekhar tells Vijay that he will give him the baby on the condition that he promises to never see Priya again and Vijay agrees. Priya gives birth to a son and Vijay takes him away. Priya's father tells her that the baby was stillborn. She is dejected and loses her mental balance and thinks that her son is still alive. Vijay brings up his son away from Priya's family. Many years later, Priya who is seriously depressed and always carries a doll assuming it to be her son, is unknowingly brought by her parents close to where Vijay lives and she gets acquainted with a boy in the neighbourhood. The boy turns out to be her son and he leads Priya to Vijay.

== Cast ==
- Rajinikanth as Vijay
- Sridevi as Priya
- Girish Karnad as Rajasekhar
- V. K. Ramasamy as R.K.S
- Manorama as Rajamma
- S. N. Parvathy as Maid
- LIC Narasimhan as Rajasekhar's friend
- Y. G. Mahendran
- Master Arjun as Kannan
- Pushpalatha as Nanny
- Senthamarai as Shankar
- K. Vijaya as Priya's mother

== Production ==
Naan Adimai Illai is a remake of the Hindi film Pyar Jhukta Nahin (1985). Rajinikanth wanted Sridevi in the film, and she accepted instantly. Director and producer Dwarakish, who also produced and directed the Kannada version Nee Bareda Kadambari (1985), noted the difficulty in obtaining her dates because "her call sheet was similar to that of a superstar". It was her final appearance in a Tamil film before she concentrated on her Bollywood career, though she would later return in the 2010s. She had played the same role in the Telugu version Pachani Kapuram (1985). The song "Pona Poguthu" was shot at Juhu Beach.

== Soundtrack ==
The soundtrack was composed by Vijay Anand. The song "Oru Jeevan Thaan" is set to the Mishra Shivaranjani raga.

Track listing
| No. | Title | Lyrics | Singer(s) | Length |
|---|---|---|---|---|
| 1. | "Oru Jeevanthan" | Vaali | S. P. Balasubrahmanyam, S. Janaki | 4:48 |
| 2. | "Devi Devi" | Vairamuthu | S. P. Balasubrahmanyam, S. Janaki | 4:32 |
| 3. | "Vaa Vaa" | Muthulingam | S. P. Balasubrahmanyam, S. Janaki | 4:35 |
| 4. | "Pona Poguthu" | Vairamuthu | S. P. Balasubrahmanyam, S. Janaki | 4:19 |
| 5. | "Oru Jeevanthan" (Pathos 1) | Vaali | S. P. Balasubrahmanyam | 4:56 |
| 6. | "Oru Jeevanthan" (Pathos 2) | Vaali | S. Janaki | 5:20 |
| 7. | "Vaa Vaa Idayame" | Muthulingam | S. P. Balasubrahmanyam, S. Janaki | 4:27 |
| Total length: | | | | 29:35 |

== Critical reception ==
Kalki criticised the film's second half, saying it looked like the film was stumbling without knowing how to take the story forward. Ananda Vikatan gave the film a rating of 41 out of 100, feeling Rajinikanth did not have much scope for performance and Girish Karnad was wasted.
