= Anubavi Raja Anubavi =

1967 film by K. Balachander

- Poster
- Directed by: K. Balachander
- Screenplay by: K. Balachander
- Story by: Rama. Arangannal
- Produced by: V. R. Annamalai; M. R. M. Arunachalam
- Starring: Nagesh; R. Muthuraman; Rajasree; Jayabharathi
- Cinematography: Nemai Ghosh
- Edited by: N. R. Kittu
- Music by: M. S. Viswanathan
- Production company: Ayya Films
- Release date: 21 July 1967
- Running time: 177 minutes
- Country: India
- Language: Tamil

Anubavi Raja Anubavi (transl. Experience it boy, experience it) is a 1967 Indian Tamil-language comedy film written and directed by K. Balachander. The film stars Nagesh along with R. Muthuraman, Rajasree and Jayabharathi. It was released in July 1967. The film was remade in Hindi as Do Phool (1974), in Malayalam as Aanandham Paramaanandham (1977) and in Kannada as Kittu Puttu (1977).

== Plot ==
Chidambaram is a rich businessman in Madurai. He has a biological son, Janakiraman, and an adopted son, Thangamuthu. The brothers are happy-go-lucky youngsters who just waste time on immature stuff. They are in love with Rajamani and Ramamani, daughters of lawyer/doctor Varadharajan. Their playful activities irritate Chidambaram so much that he disowns them and kicks them out of his house.

The brothers go to the family vacation home in Kodaikanal and hatch a plan to impress their father. Finally they decide that Thangamuthu should fake his own death and Janakiraman should be accused of murdering his (adopted) brother to preserve his legacy. That way, Chidambaram will be forced to publicly accept them as his sons. Jankiraman stages a murder scene and surrenders to police claiming he murdered his brother. But a group of robbers mistake Thangamuthu for a policeman and decide to kill him.

Chidambaram is shocked and pleads to the police to not arrest his son. Janakiraman is happy his plan is a success and reveals to the police that the entire thing was staged. However, he ends up in jail because several circumstantial evidences are against him, compounded by the fact that Thangamuthu is still missing. Chidambaram advertises in the newspaper promising a reward for anyone who finds Thangamuthu.

The scene shifts to Thoothukkudi where Manickam is an innocent port worker and is a look alike of Thangamuthu. We learn his brother has been missing for 18 years. Manickam falls asleep in a ship while loading, and the ship takes him to Madras. He is abducted by couple people who plan to take him to Chidambaram and present him as Thangamuthu for the reward.

It is revealed that Thangamuthu escaped from his abductors. But when he tries to return to Madurai, he gets swapped with Manickam and ends up with Muthamma, who thinks he is Manickam, while Manickam ends up at Chidambaram's house, where everyone thinks he is Thangamuthu.

Chidambaram and his lawyers present Manickam (posing as Thangamuthu) in court in an attempt to declare the case infructuous. But the opposition lawyer figures out the swap and the court is almost convinced Thangamuthu is dead and Janakiraman is the killer. But real Thangamuthu appears right in time to clear all confusion and everything ends well.

== Cast ==
- Nagesh as Thangamuthu and Manikkam
- R. Muthuraman as Janakiraman
- Rajasree as Rajamani
- Jayabharathi as Ramamani
- Manorama as Muthamma
- Major Sundarrajan as Chidambaram
- Typist Gopu as the bandit leader
- O. A. K. Thevar as Public Prosecutor
- Hari Krishnan as Varadharajan
- T. P. Muthulakshmi as Maragadham
- S. N. Lakshmi as Manikkam mother
- S. N. Parvathy as Savior of thangamuthu
- Samikannu as Varadharajan's assistant

== Production ==
Anubavi Raja Anubavi was directed by K. Balachander, who wrote the screenplay based on a story by Rama Arangannal. The film was produced by V. R. Annamalai and M. R. M. Arunachalam under Ayya Films. Cinematography was handled by Nemai Ghosh, and editing by N. R. Kittu. The song "Madras Nalla Madras", picturised on Nagesh, was filmed on the roads of Madras (now Chennai) and Marina Beach.

== Soundtrack ==
Music was composed by M. S. Viswanathan, while the lyrics were written by Kannadasan. "Madras Nalla Madras" was one of the first songs that tried to provide a commentary on life in the city. References to how no one goes slow on the road or speaks good Tamil are made in the song. Like most songs in Balachander's films, the lyrics were satirical in nature. "Muthukulikka Vaareergala" was sung in the Thoothukudi dialect. "Muthukulikka" was later reused in the film's Hindi remake Do Phool.

Tamil track list

Song	Singers	Length
"Muthukulikka Vaareergala"	L. R. Eswari, T. M. Soundararajan, M. S. Viswanathan	03:34
"Anubavi Raja Anubavi"	L. R. Eswari, P. Susheela	03:28
"Madras Nalla Madras"	T. M. Soundararajan	03:13
"Azhagirukkuthu"	Sirkazhi Govindarajan, T. M. Soundararajan	03:18
"Maanendru Pennukkoru"	P. Susheela	4:47

Telugu track list

The Telugu language lyrics were written by Anisetty Subbarao.

Song	Singers	Length
"Malleteega Poosindiraa"	L. R. Eswari, Ghantasala	03:34
"Anubhavincu Raja Anubhavincu"	L. R. Eswari, P. Susheela	03:28
"Madrasu Vinta Madrasu"	Pithapuram Nageswara Rao	03:13
"Andalucinde Jagatilo"	S. P. Balasubrahmanyam, Pithapuram Nageswara Rao	03:18
"Maatallo Mallelloni"	P. Susheela	4:47

== Reception ==
The Indian Express wrote, "The whole narration, a complete botch, is further burdened by unconvincing romantic complications. Besides under the curiously limp and unvaried direction of Balachander, the notable cast gives a somewhat dispirited performance." Kalki lauded Nagesh's performance but criticised the songs, calling the film a laugh riot worth watching. The film was a box office hit.
