= Mamatheya Bandhana =

- Directed by: B. S. Narayan
- Produced by: B. S. Dwarakish; Veerraju; Madhavaiah
- Starring: B. M. Venkatesh; Jayanthi; Dwarakish; K. S. Ashwath
- Cinematography: Debri M. S. Mani
- Music by: Satyam
- Production company: Thunga Pictures
- Release date: 1966
- Country: India
- Language: Kannada

Mamatheya Bandhana is a 1966 Indian Kannada-language film, directed by B. S. Narayan and jointly produced by B. S. Dwarakish, Veerraju and Madhavaiah under Thunga Pictures. This was actor Dwarkish's first attempt at production as he was one of the three producers of the movie though his first independent production venture was Mayor Muthanna which released three years later. The film stars B. M. Venkatesh, Jayanthi, Dwarakish and K. S. Ashwath in the lead roles. The film has musical score by Satyam.

== Cast ==
- B. M. Venkatesh
- Jayanthi
- Dwarakish
- K. S. Ashwath
- B. Jayashree
