= Kiladigalu =

- Theatrical release poster
- Directed by: Dwarakish
- Written by: Dwarakish
- Produced by: M. K. Srinivasamurthy
- Starring: Vishnuvardhan; Dwarakish; Swarna
- Cinematography: D. V. Rajaram
- Edited by: Suresh Urs
- Music by: Raj–Koti
- Production company: Akshaya Enterprises
- Release date: 1994
- Running time: 147 minutes
- Country: India
- Language: Kannada

Kiladigalu is a 1994 Indian Kannada-language comedy film directed by Dwarakish and produced by M. K. Srinivasamurthy. Starring Vishnuvardhan and Dwarakish in dual roles, the film also featured Swarna, Sriraksha, Avinash and B. C. Patil in prominent roles. The music for the film was scored by Raj–Koti. Few sequences of the movie were partially based on the 1990 Marathi film Aamchyasarkhe Aamhich. The famous cycle-chase sequence from the 1983 Hong Kong film Project A, was used in this film. The same sequence was later used in the 2012 Hindi film Barfi!.

== Plot ==
Hari and Krishna's chikkappa (uncle) plots to murder them to amass their wealth with the help of the family lawyer and his friend, Diwan. However, Diwan and the lawyer manage to save them and replace them with two look-alike conmens, Kittappa and Puttappa. Little does the lawyer know that Diwan has a secret plan to usurp the brothers' wealth.

== Cast ==
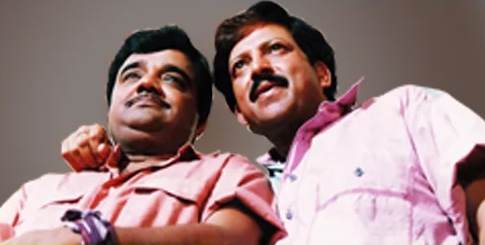
Dwarakish, Vishnuvardhan in the film

- Vishnuvardhan (dual role) - Kittappa "Kittu" / Krishna
- Dwarakish (dual role) - Puttappa "Puttu" / Hari
- Swarna - Dr. Deepa
- Sriraksha - Nurse Roopa
- Avinash - Chikkaraja
- B. C. Patil - lawyer Diwan
- Ramesh Bhat as inspector Madhava
- Sihi Kahi Chandru as Inspector Chandru
- Anjana as Inspector Anjana
- B. Jayamma
- Jyothi Gurucharan as Muthamma
- Bangalore Nagesh
- Mandeep Roy
- Sathyajith
- Sangeetha
- Joe Simon
- Srishailan
- Junior Narasimharaju
- Pailwaan Venu
- Bank Suresh
- Stunt Siddu
- Stunt Devu
- Nanjundi Nagaraj

== Soundtrack ==
The music of the film was composed by Raj–Koti.

Kiladigalu

Soundtrack album by Raj–Koti
- Released: 1994
- Genre: Feature film soundtrack
- Label: Jhankar Music

No.	Title	Lyrics	Singer(s)	Length
1.	"Kaala Mathomme"	M. N. Vyasa Rao	S. P. Balasubrahmanyam, P. Jayachandran
2.	"Karunada Kuvara Naane"	M. N. Vyasa Rao	Mano, K. S. Chithra
3.	"Ee Neeru Thanda Kikku"	R. N. Jayagopal	Manjula Gururaj
4.	"Alukade Balukade Banni"	R. N. Jayagopal	S. P. Balasubrahmanyam, P. Jayachandran
5.	"Ee Aata Kunidaata"	R. N. Jayagopal	Manjula Gururaj, K. S. Chithra
6.	"Ninna Notake"	R. N. Jayagopal	S. P. Balasubrahmanyam, K. S. Chithra
