= Kittu Puttu =

1977 film by C. V. Rajendran

- DVD cover
- Directed by: C. V. Rajendran
- Written by: S. Ramanathan
- Based on: Anubavi Raja Anubavi (Tamil)(1967)
- Produced by: Dwarakish
- Starring: Vishnuvardhan; Manjula; Vaishali Kasaravalli; Dwarakish
- Cinematography: S. S. Lal
- Edited by: Yadav Victor
- Music by: Rajan–Nagendra
- Production company: Dwarakish Chitra
- Release date: 1977
- Running time: 155 minutes
- Country: India
- Language: Kannada

Kittu Puttu is a 1977 Indian Kannada-language comedy drama film directed by C. V. Rajendran and produced by Dwarakish. The film stars Vishnuvardhan, Dwarakish, Manjula, K. Vijaya and Vaishali Kasaravalli. The film was widely appreciated for its songs and story upon release. The songs composed by Rajan–Nagendra were huge hits.

The movie is a remake of 1967 Tamil movie Anubavi Raja Anubavi which was also earlier remade in Hindi in 1973 as Do Phool. Kittu Puttu went on to also inspire the 1993 Hindi movie Aankhen. The Tamil movie was also remade in Marathi as Changu Mangu (1990) and had one of the characters singing a Kannada song Naa Ninna Jeeva Ramanna which comes at the same sequence as Maatonda Heluve in this movie.

The dual role played by Nagesh was reprised by Mehmood in the Hindi version and by Dwarakish in the Kannada version. Earlier, the triple role played by Nagesh in Panakkara Kudumbam was reprised by Mehmood in the Hindi version (Humjoli) and by Dwarakish in the Kannada version (Bhale Huduga).

== Cast ==
- Vishnuvardhan as Kittu
- Dwarakish as Puttu and Kutti (double role)
- Manjula as Roopa, Kittu's lover
- K. Vijaya as Deepa, Puttu's Lover
- Vaishali Kasaravalli as Kamali, Kutti's Lover
- Lokanath as Kittu and Puttu's father
- M. P. Shankar as smuggler
- Thoogudeepa Srinivas as Kittu and Puttu's uncle
- Tiger Prabhakar as Peter
- Jayashree as Kittu and Puttu's mother
- Narasimharaju as Roopa and Deepa's father
- Annapoornamma as Kutti's mother
- Shimoga Venkatesh

== Soundtrack ==
The music of the film was composed by Rajan–Nagendra and lyrics written by Chi. Udaya Shankar. The songs "Nille Gowramma" and "Kaalvannu Thadeyoru" were well-received. The latter song (Kaalavannu Thadeyoru) was set in Raga Bageshri, which music director Gurukiran reused in the film Apthamitra (2004), retaining the same lyrics and tune.

Track listing
No.	Title	Singer(s)	Length
1.	"Nille Gowramma"	S. P. Balasubrahmanyam & K. J. Yesudas
2.	"Kaalavannu Thadeyoru"	K. J. Yesudas & S. Janaki
3.	"Maathonda Heluve"	S. P. Balasubrahmanyam & S. Janaki
4.	"Oh Johny Oh Sony"	S. P. Balasubrahmanyam
5.	"Nillo Kaamanna"	P. Susheela & S. Janaki
