= Singaporenalli Raja Kulla =

- Film poster
- Directed by: C. V. Rajendran
- Written by: Chi. Udayashankar (dialogues)
- Screenplay by: M. D. Sundar
- Story by: M. D. Sundar
- Produced by: Dwarakish
- Starring: Vishnuvardhan; Dwarakish; Manjula
- Cinematography: D. V. Rajaram
- Edited by: Yadav Victor
- Music by: Rajan–Nagendra
- Production company: Dwarakish Chithra
- Distributed by: Eshwari Pictures; Srinivasa Pictures; Khadri Enterprises
- Release date: 23 December 1978
- Running time: 153 minutes
- Country: India
- Language: Kannada

Singaporenalli Raja Kulla ( transl. Raja and Kulla in Singapore) is a 1978 Indian Kannada-language action film directed by C. V. Rajendran and produced by Dwarakish. The film stars Vishnuvardhan and Dwarkish, alongside Manjula, Felina, Lokanath, Uma Shivakumar, Shakti Prasad and Thoogudeepa Srinivas. The music was composed by Rajan–Nagendra, while cinematography and editing were handled by D. V. Rajaram and Yadav Victor.

Set and shot in Singapore, Singaporenalli Raja Kulla was the first Kannada film to be shot outside India in a country, which is not a neighbouring nation. It is also the second Kannada film to be shot outside India after Operation Diamond Racket (which was shot in Nepal and released four months before this film). However, it was widely credited for having started the trend of shooting abroad.

Singaporenalli Raja Kulla was the first Kannada film to run over 200 days in the Belagavi region. The film was dubbed and released in Tamil as Sweet Singapore.

== Plot ==
A jeweller Shivaraj (Lokanath), who harbours ambitions of a successful life abroad, enters into a partnership with Junie (Thoogudeepa Srinivas) after abandoning his pregnant wife (Uma Shivakumar) and they both land in Singapore. Unknown to Shivaraj, Junie is into smuggling diamonds and various other illegal activities, and is wanted by the Indian and Singaporean police department. CID detective Venugopal aka Kulla is assigned the task of hunting down both of them and bringing them to justice in India. Meanwhile, Shivaraj's son Raja, who is now a singer in a hotel, gets to know Venugopal, though he is unaware that he is a detective. Tara is Raja's girlfriend. Her father Gopinath Rao (Shakti Prasad), also involved in shady businesses, promises Raja a good life, if he contract kills an old rival of his, Shivaraj, in Singapore, for ₹1,500,000 (US$16,000). Meanwhile, Venugopal gets to know, and becomes friends with Felina, a Singaporean woman who has spent some time in India and knows Kannada too.

Initially reluctant, Raja travels to Singapore. Rao, knowing from Venugopal that Raja is Shivaraj's son, asks his Singapore-based business partner Diwakar to kill him and hires Venugopal to contract-kill Shivaraj for ₹2,000,000 (US$21,000). Tara overhears his conversation with Diwakar and immediately flies to Singapore and informs Raja. Meanwhile, Kulla also lands in Singapore, on his mission. But Raja is also on his cross-hairs. He assumes Raja is in Singapore to kill someone and confronts him repeatedly, with quarrels and physical fighting as well. Raja meets Shivaraj at a hotel and immediately looks at the photo that his mother has given him, of her and Shivaraj in their younger days. Raja introduces himself and says he is from Bengaluru. Shivaraj is taken aback, which Raja senses, and asks if he knows anybody there, a question that makes Shivaraj uncomfortable.

As Shivaraj turns back and takes a few steps away, Raja drops that photo and calls out to Shivaraj, that he dropped something. Shivaraj picking up the photo is surprised to see that it is of him and his wife. Later, after a bitter physical fight between them, Raja and Kulla meet up with Shivaraj, who tells him about his meet up with Junie and how he was duped into the unlawful business. Kulla assures Shivaraj that he would help him get out of this situation, if he simply listens to his instructions. Raja and Kulla fight with Junie and a chase ensues where Junie desperately tries to board a helicopter. Kulla, who is already hiding in the helicopter, kicks him out and his associate. A Singapore policeman shoots Junie and kills him. Raja unites with his family.

== Cast ==
- Vishnuvardhan as Raja
- Dwarakish as CID Venugopal (Venu) alias Kulla
- Manjula as Tara
- Felina as Felina
- Loknath as Shivaraj
- Uma Shivakumar as Shivaraj's wife
- Thoogudeepa Srinivas as Junie
- Shakti Prasad as Gopinath Rao, Tara's father
- Bhadrachalam
- Anand Mohan
- Manasa Rao
- Peter Jones
- Peter Pong
- Jimmy
- Vijay
- Sahul
- Manmatha Rao
- Thipatur Siddaramaiah
- Kannada Raju
- M. Shivaji Rao
- Police Mahadev

== Soundtrack ==
Singaporenalli Raja Kulla

Soundtrack album by Rajan–Nagendra
- Released: 1978
- Genre: Feature film soundtrack
- Length: 22:05
- Label: His Master's Voice

The duo of Rajan–Nagendra composed the film's background score and music for the soundtracks, with lyrics written by Chi. Udaya Shankar. The album consists of four soundtracks. An extended part of the song "Prema Preethi Nannusiru", shot and picturised in a Singapore hotel where Raja (Vishnuvardhan) confronts Kulla (Dwarakish) in a song, is not available in the audio album. Else it would be five tracks in all. This song is available on YouTube.

All the songs were recorded at the England Recording Studio with 2 track stereo split recording. Audio Copyrights given to Coloumbia Records for Gramophone records, and His Master's Voice for audio cassettes. In the track "Prema Preeti Nannusiru", it could be noticed that "Prema" is heard from in left channel and "Preethi" from the right, giving it a stereophonic effect.

Track listing
No.	Title	Lyrics	Singer(s)	Length
1.	"Ninne Ninnege"	Chi. Udaya Shankar	S. P. Balasubrahmanyam, S. Janaki	5:58
2.	"Prema Preeti Nannusiru"	Chi. Udaya Shankar	S. P. Balasubrahmanyam, K. J. Yesudas	5:51
3.	"Nannantha Gandilla"	Chi. Udaya Shankar	S. P. Balasubrahmanyam, K. J. Yesudas, S. Janaki, P. Susheela	5:41
4.	"Belliya Raja Baaro"	Chi. Udaya Shankar	S. P. Balasubrahmanyam, S. Janaki	4:35
Total length:				22:05
