= Mane Mane Kathe =

- Directed by: Rajachandra
- Written by: Chi. Udaya Shankar (dialogues)
- Screenplay by: Rajachandra
- Story by: Rajachandra
- Based on: Ramayanamlo Padikala Veta (1980)
- Produced by: B. S. Dwarakish; H. R. Prabhakar Reddy
- Starring: Vishnuvardhan; Jayachitra; Srinivasa Murthy; K. Vijaya
- Cinematography: D. V. Rajaram; Sathish
- Edited by: Yadav Victor
- Music by: Satyam
- Production company: D R Films
- Distributed by: D R Films
- Release date: 21 January 1981
- Running time: 106 min
- Country: India
- Language: Kannada

Mane Mane Kathe ( transl. Story of every home) is a 1981 Indian Kannada-language film, directed by Rajachandra and produced by B. S. Dwarakish and H. R. Prabhakar Reddy. The film stars Vishnuvardhan, Jayachitra, Srinivasa Murthy and K. Vijaya. The movie is a remake of the Telugu movie Ramayanamlo Pidakala Veta.

== Plot ==
Subbu and Seenu, two neighbourhood friends, marry their lovers against the wishes of their parents. Later, one's family accepts their daughter-in-law, while chaos ensues at the other one's home.

== Cast ==
- Vishnuvardhan as Subrahmanya aka Subbu
- Jayachitra as Geetha
- Srinivasa Murthy as Srinivasa aka Seenu
- K. Vijaya as Gayathri
- Lokanath as Vishwanatha Subbu father
- Leelavathi as Subbu mother
- Seetharam as Ramanatha Seenu father
- Dubbing Janaki as Janaki Seenu mother
- Dwarakish as Tha Thee Tha aka Tharle Thammayya
- Uma Shivakumar
- BV Bhaskar

== Soundtrack ==
The music was composed by Satyam.

No.	Song	Singers	Lyrics	Length (m:ss)
1	"Ye Hudugi"	S. P. Balasubrahmanyam, S. Janaki	Chi. Udaya Shankar	04:52
2	"Maneya Hambala"	S. P. Balasubrahmanyam, S. Janaki	Chi. Udaya Shankar	04:31
3	"Gandu Hennu"	S. P. Balasubrahmanyam	Chi. Udaya Shankar	04:28
4	"Sarasake"	S. P. Balasubrahmanyam	Chi. Udaya Shankar	04:12
