= Devara Duddu =

- Directed by: K. S. L. Swamy
- Written by: Narendra Babu (dialogues)
- Screenplay by: K. A. Natarajan
- Story by: Vaali
- Produced by: N. Rani
- Starring: Rajesh; Srinath; Jayanthi; Hema Choudhary; Cudavalli Chandrashekar
- Cinematography: N. G. Rao
- Edited by: Bal G. Yadav; Victor
- Music by: Rajan–Nagendra
- Production company: Rani Arts
- Distributed by: Rani Arts
- Release date: 30 December 1976
- Running time: Array
- Country: India
- Language: Kannada

Devara Duddu ( transl. God's money) is a 1976 Indian Kannada-language film, directed by K. S. L. Swamy and produced by N. Rani. The film stars Rajesh, Srinath, Jayanthi, Hema Choudhary and Cudavalli Chandrashekar. The film has musical score by Rajan–Nagendra. The film was a remake of the Tamil film Kaliyuga Kannan.

== Cast ==
- Rajesh as Madhoo
- Srinath as Krishna
- Jayanthi as Ambuja
- Hema Choudhary as Radha
- Cudavalli Chandrashekar as Muddu Krishna
- Balakrishna
- Dwarakish as Balu
- Manorama as Kempamma
- Lokanath
- Ashwath Narayan

== Soundtrack ==
The music was composed by Rajan–Nagendra.

No.	Song	Singers	Lyrics	Length (m:ss)
1	"Godhooli"	P. B. Sreenivas, P. Susheela	R. N. Jayagopal	03:54
2	"Gaaliya Patadante"	P. B. Sreenivas	Hunsur Krishnamurthy	05:19
3	"Tarikeri Eri Mele Mooru Kari"	S. P. Balasubrahmanyam	R N Jayagopal	05:12
