= Apthamitra =

2004 film directed by P. Vasu

- Promotional poster
- Directed by: P. Vasu
- Screenplay by: P. Vasu
- Story by: Madhu Muttam
- Based on: Manichitrathazhu (1993)
- Produced by: Dwarakish
- Starring: Vishnuvardhan; Soundarya; Ramesh Aravind; Prema; Dwarakish
- Cinematography: Ramesh Babu
- Edited by: N. P. Satish
- Music by: Gurukiran
- Production company: Dwarakish Chitra
- Release date: 27 August 2004
- Running time: 146 minutes
- Country: India
- Language: Kannada
- Budget: ₹3 crore
- Box office: ₹20 crore

Apthamitra (transl. Close friend) is a 2004 Indian Kannada-language psychological horror film written and directed by P. Vasu and produced by Dwarakish. The film stars Vishnuvardhan, Soundarya and Ramesh in the lead roles, while Prema, Avinash and Dwarakish appear in supporting roles. It marks posthumous film for Soundarya in Kannada, released after her death on 17 April 2004. The film was released on 27 August 2004. It is a remake of Malayalam film Manichithrathazhu with some plot changes.

Apthamitra ran for 365 days in theaters across Karnataka and was the highest ever grossing Kannada movie at that time and was an industry hit. The plot changes from the original were retained when P.Vasu remade this movie in Tamil as Chandramukhi (2005). The film was later followed by a sequel titled Aptharakshaka (2010).

== Plot ==
Ramesh and Ganga are a married couple who have recently moved to Mysore to buy an ancient palace against the wishes of his uncle Shivananda and family elders. Shivananda agrees to reside with them with his two daughters Vani and Hema on the condition that the room on the first floor which is locked and sealed should not be visited by anyone in the family. They have their caretaker Rangajja, who lives in the outhouse with his granddaughter Sowmya. During their stay in the house, they learn that the palace once belonged to Raja Vijaya Rajendra Bahaddur, who had a court dancer named Nagavalli from Andhra Pradesh. Raja was in love with Nagavalli, but she had already loved a fellow dancer named Ramanatha, who used to reside in a house just behind the palace. After discovering their affair on a Durgashtami day, Raja beheaded Ramanatha and burned Nagavalli alive. Before her death, Nagavalli vowed to burn the Raja alive on the very same Durgashtami day.

Strange things occur in the palace and everyone suspects Sowmya, who is always found at the place of the incident. Ramesh calls his psychiatrist friend Vijay to help him clear the misconceptions regarding the palace and its history. Shivananda is unhappy with Vijay's ways and is suspicious of him. Ramesh's cousin Vani is in love with an orphan dance teacher Mahadev who incidentally resides in the same house behind the palace. Vijay learns about this and tells Shivananda, who approves the alliance and their marriage is fixed. When the whole family is out of town to visit Mahadev to decide on his wedding with Vani, Ganga opens the room on the first floor with the key given by Sowmya. During the time, there are attempts to kill Ramesh by some mysterious being, which every time is foiled by Vijay. Vani is also attacked by an anonymous entity and these incidents make Shivananda to call Acharya Ramachandra Shastri, a popular exorcist to perform some peace ritual upon the palace.

Though not interested in all these proceedings, Ramesh agrees with his advice of Vijay. On the eve of Mahadev and Vani's engagement ceremony, Ganga accuses Mahadev of trying to molest her - which is refused by both Mahadev and Vijay. Upon hearing this, Ramesh gets angry at Vijay, where Acharya tells Vijay to reveal the mystery behind the strange incidents. Vijay reveals to everyone that Ganga (who turned into Nagavalli personality) is behind all the strange incidents and had tried to kill Ramesh and Vani because Nagavalli thinks that Mahadevan is her lover Ramanathan. Ganga who visited the first-floor room was enamored by Nagavalli and her diary. Since Ganga suffered from Split personality disorder, the mystery behind Nagavalli's story made her develop an unusual empathy for Nagavalli, which resulted in the personality of Nagavalli to enter Ganga's body.

Ganga (in her Nagavalli personality) now intends to kill Vijay as he had posed in front of her as Raja Vijaya Rajendra Bahaddur on the coming Durgashtami day as vowed by Nagavalli while dying. On Durgashtami in the dance hall, the family and Acharya allow Ganga (in her Nagavalli personality) to burn Vijay alive. Acharya then blows smoke and ash on Ganga's face when she is given a torch to burn Vijay. Ramesh then opens a trapdoor to let Vijay escape, and an effigy of Raja gets burnt instead. Convinced that Raja is dead, Nagavalli personality inside Ganga, as promised to Acharya, leaves Ganga and she gets cured. Vijay helps Ganga psychologically later to regain herself, where Ramesh thanks Vijay for his help. Before leaving, Vijay meets Sowmya in person and asks her to meet his parents, if she really loves him and wishes to marry him. Mukunda, Shivananda's elder brother, another of Ramesh's maternal uncles, accompanies Vijay on his journey to the States as he had now developed an affection and respect for him.

== Cast ==
- Vishnuvardhan in a dual roles as Dr. Vijay and Vijaya Rajendra Bahaddur
- Soundarya in a dual roles as Ganga and Nagavalli
- Ramesh Aravind as Ramesh
- Prema as Sowmya
- Dwarakish as Mukunda
- Avinash as Acharya Ramachandra Shastri
- Pramila Joshai as Rukku
- Shivaram as Rangajja
- Satyajit as Shivananda
- Shridhar Jain as Dancer Ramnath and Prof. Mahadev
- Bhoomika Shetty as Hema
- Sneha as vani

== Production ==
The film began production after Vishnuvardhan agreed to act in a film directed by P. Vasu and produced by Dwarakish. Vishnuvardhan and Dwarakish has starred together in several films including Kalla Kulla (1975). However, it was only their second collaboration as actors and producer after 30 years. Vasu, who had worked with Vishnuvardhan in Hrudayavantha (2003) was hired to direct Apthamitra. A contemporary report of the film's launching called the it "a comedy cum sentimental film plus a small dose of action." Producer Dwarakish revealed that he would play a role in the film. Ramesh Aravind, Prema and Soundarya were signed to play other lead roles alongside Vishnuvardhan.

It was reported that the film was based on the 1993 Malayalam film, Manichithrathazhu. However, the director noted that Apthamitra would differ in that Vishnuvardhan, playing a "talkative psychiatrist", would appear in the first reel, as opposed to Mohanlal's character appearing in the seventh reel in Manichithrathazhu. Expanding on the film's characters, Vishnuvardhana noted that his character would have a "split image character". He added: "All the characters are important and lead to the story. The treatment and presentation is different. In some cases the roles are tailor made for artistes. But in this case for the role I am acting accordingly." The film was launched on 18 February 2004, coinciding with the festival of Maha Shivaratri.

According to Vasu, seventy percent of the film is similar to Manichithrathazhu. This was Soundarya's last film in her career. Shashikala dubbed for Soundarya.

== Soundtrack ==
Apthamitra

Soundtrack album by Gurukiran
- Released: 26 July 2004
- Recorded: Ashwini Recording Company
- Genre: Feature film soundtrack
- Length: 28:31
- Language: Kannada
- Label: Ashwini Audio
- Producer: Gurukiran

Gurukiran chronology
Kanti (2004)	Apthamitra (2004)	Omkara (2004)

Gurukiran scored the film's background music and composed for its soundtrack, with lyrics for the tracks written by V. Manohar, Kaviraj, V. Nagendra Prasad and Goturi. The soundtrack album, which received positive reviews from critics, consists of six tracks. The track "Kaalavannu Tadeyoru" was taken from the 1977 film, Kittu Puttu (composed by Rajan-Nagendra) which had Dwarakish and Vishnuvardhan playing the lead roles as well; the lyrics for which was written by Chi. Udayashankar. The music for the film was well received upon release. The chorus of "Raa Raa" was reused in Chandramukhi (2005) by Vidyasagar after Rajinikanth's insistence.

Track list
No.	Title	Lyrics	Singer(s)	Length
1.	"Anku Donku"	V. Manohar	S. P. Balasubrahmanyam, K. S. Chithra	4:40
2.	"Kaalavannu Tadeyoru"	Chi. Udayashankar	Hariharan, Gurukiran	5:05
3.	"Kana Kanade"	Kaviraj	Madhu Balakrishnan	5:01
4.	"Pata Pata"	V. Nagendra Prasad	Udit Narayan, K. S. Chithra	4:32
5.	"Baara Baara"	Goturi	Rajesh Krishnan, Nanditha	4:43
6.	"Raa Raa"	Goturi	Nithyashree Mahadevan, Rajesh Krishnan	4:41
Total length:				28:42

== Reception ==
A critic from Sify wrote, "This is a well made film in which talented actress Soundarya made her last appearance in a Kannada film which is a supernatural thriller. Gurukiran’s music is a major advantage for the film and on the whole Aptamithra is worth a watch." A critic from Viggy wrote that "Multi-starrer Aptha Mitra is a perfect treat for people who wants quality entertainer". S. N. Deepak of Deccan Herald wrote "Suspense, horror, comedy, superstition and sentiments continue the story well. A kitchen scene which tries to creates suspense seems to have escaped the director’s concentration. The story picks up tempo in the suspense scenes in the first part and starts unfolding slowly in the post-interval part. Above all, the film also throws light on human psychology." By the film's 34th week it collected over 10 crores at box office. The release of Chandramukhi did not affect the film's collections. It completed one year (52 weeks) screening at Santosh theatre in Bangalore.

== Awards ==
52nd Filmfare Awards South

The film, won five Filmfare Awards that include:

- Best Film – Kannada: Dwarakish
- Best Director – Kannada: P. Vasu
- Best Actor – Kannada: Vishnuvardhan
- Best Actress – Kannada: Soundarya
- Best Music Director – Kannada: Gurukiran

== In popular culture ==
The dialogues "Nannu vaadi to velladaniki vadalava?" (transl. Will you not let me go with him?) spoken by Soundarya and "Ide, illeno samasye ide." (transl. Here in this place, some problem exists.) by Avinash's character became popular. In an introduction scene of Sudeep from Vishnuvardhana, Sudeep's character is shown watching Apthamitra featuring Vishnuvardhan in a fight/intro scene in a theatre with other fans. He is also shown imitating the character of the actor in a fight scene from Apthamitra with archive scenes from the film, which was shown to be a tributary scene for the actor from the film.
