= Lagna Patrike =

Indian Kannada television drama

- Genre: Drama
- Starring: Sanjana Burli; Soorja Hoogar; Krishna Nadig; Ravi Bhat; Sundar; Marina thara; Jyothi; Renuka
- Country of origin: India
- Original language: Kannada
- No. of episodes: 55

Production
- Camera setup: Multi-camera
- Running time: 10:00 PM

Original release
- Network: Colors Kannada
- Release: 21 September – 27 November 2020

Lagna Patrike is an Indian Kannada language television drama that premiered on Colors Kannada on 21 September 2020. The show formally came to an end in November 2020, after airing for 2 months due to poor TRP ratings.

== Plot ==
The serial was mainly focused on two youngsters Shashank and Mayuri, who are dead rivals in their professional lives. But their family members felt that they were a perfect match and decided to get them married. The story shows how the two youngsters plot against the family members and try to cancel their wedding.

== Cast ==
- Soorja Hoogar as Shashank
- Sanjana Burli as Mayuri
- Chaithra Kottur as Namitha
- Krishna Nadig
