= Ee Jeeva Ninagagi =

- VCD cover
- Directed by: V. Somashekhar
- Written by: Chi. Udaya Shankar (dialogues)
- Screenplay by: P. Vasu
- Story by: P. Vasu
- Produced by: Vijaya Shankar Bhat
- Starring: Vishnuvardhan; Urvashi; Baby Shalini; Lokanath
- Cinematography: H. G. Raju
- Edited by: Victor Yadav
- Music by: Vijayanand
- Production companies: Devi & Devi Films
- Distributed by: Devi & Devi Films
- Release date: 28 May 1986
- Running time: 136 min
- Country: India
- Language: Kannada

Ee Jeeva Ninagagi ( transl. This life is for you) is a 1986 Indian Kannada-language romantic drama film, directed by V. Somashekhar and produced by Vijaya Shankar Bhat. The film stars Vishnuvardhan, Urvashi, Baby Shalini and Lokanath. The film has musical score by Vijayanand. Vasu who wrote story for this film remade it in Tamil as Amma Vandhachu.

== Cast ==
- Vishnuvardhan as Chandrasekhar
- Urvashi as Rohini
- Baby Shalini
- Lokanath
- N. S. Rao
- Mysore Lokesh
- Bangalore Nagesh
- Thimmayya
- Karanth
- Shani Mahadevappa
- Sarigama Viji
- B. K. Shankar
- Thipatur Siddaramaiah
- Chandrashekar
- Sampangi
- Chikkanna
- Muniraju
- Master Rajesh
- Pramila Joshai
- Shashikala
- Shamala
- Kokila
- Lalithamma
- Sathyabhama
- Seema
- Hemanalini
- Srivani
- Baby Nandini
- Baby Pramodini
- Dinesh in Guest Appearance
- Jai Jagadish in Guest Appearance
- Sudheer in Guest Appearance
- Mukhyamantri Chandru in Guest Appearance

== Soundtrack ==
Soundtrack was composed by Vijayanand.

No.	Title	Singer(s)	Length
1.	"Amma Amma Anno Maathu"	Shalini Ajith Kumar	3:58
2.	"Mannisu Endodane"	S. P. Balasubrahmanyam, S. Janaki	3:51
3.	"Amma Amma Anno Maathu"	K. J. Yesudas	3:39
4.	"Preethiyinda Ene Kelu"	S. P. Balasubrahmanyam	4:12
