= Adhipatra =

2025 Indian suspense thriller film

- Theatrical release poster
- Directed by: Chayan Shetty
- Produced by: Sachin Shetty; Rajesh Iyengar
- Starring: Roopesh Shetty; Jahnavi Mahadi
- Music by: Sachin Basrur
- Release date: 7 February 2025
- Country: India
- Language: Kannada

Adhipatra is a 2025 Indian Kannada-language suspense thriller film directed by Chayan Shetty and produced by Sachin Shetty and Rajesh Iyengar. The film stars Roopesh Shetty as Athreya, a police officer, and Jahnavi Mahadi as Bruhati, marking her acting debut. Set in the coastal region of Karnataka, it incorporates elements of local culture, including Huli Kunitha and Yakshagana. The film was released on 7 February 2025.

== Plot ==
Adhipatra is a murder mystery set in the forests of coastal Karnataka. The story follows Athreya, a police officer played by Roopesh Shetty, as he investigates a series of events intertwined with local myths, including Gaggara Betta and Brahma Rakshasa. The narrative blends suspense with cultural elements like Huli Kunitha, Yakshagana, and the Kalanja ritual of Tulunadu, avoiding a conventional romantic subplot to focus on Bruhati’s standalone story.

== Cast ==
- Roopesh Shetty as Athreya, a police officer
- Jahnavi Mahadi as Bruhati
- Prakash Thuminad as Constable Ramappa
- Raghu Pandeshwar as Prashant
- Prashant Nata as Balarama, a newspaper editor
- MK Mata as Markhandaya
- Deepak Rai Panaje

== Production ==
=== Development ===
The film was announced in August 2023, with Chayan Shetty directing and Roopesh Shetty cast as Athreya, a police officer. Jahnavi Mahadi, a debutante, was selected to play Bruhati. The project aimed to highlight coastal Karnataka's culture, incorporating Huli Kunitha, Yakshagana, and the Kalanja ritual.

=== Filming ===
Principal photography began in August 2023 and was completed by May 2024. The film was shot primarily in coastal Karnataka to capture its forests and cultural elements.

== Music ==
The film's music was composed by Sachin Basrur. The first song, "Aati Kalanja," featuring vocals by Anuradha Bhat, was released in 2024. Lahari Music acquired the audio rights in May 2024.

== Marketing ==
A teaser was released in 2024, followed by a trailer that highlighted the film's suspenseful narrative and cultural elements. A poster was unveiled in 2024, emphasizing the coastal setting.

== Release ==
Adhipatra was released theatrically on 7 February 2025.

== Reception ==
Sridevi S. of The Times of India rated the film 3/5, praising Roopesh Shetty's performance and the coastal setting but noting that the pacing could have been tighter. A. Sharadhaa of The New Indian Express described it as a "slow-burn thriller" with strong cultural elements but criticized its uneven narrative, rating it 2.5/5. Y. Maheshwara Reddy of Bangalore Mirror called it a "gripping whodunnit" and appreciated its cinematography, giving it 3.5/5. Madan Kumar of TV9 Kannada lauded the murder mystery and Shetty's acting but felt the climax was predictable.
