= Dance Raja Dance =

- Directed by: Dwarakish
- Written by: Dwarakish
- Produced by: Dwarakish
- Starring: Vinod Raj; Divya; Srinath; Devaraj
- Cinematography: R. Deviprasad
- Edited by: Gowtham Raju
- Music by: Vijayanand
- Production company: Dwarakish Chitra
- Release date: 31 August 1987
- Running time: 134 minutes
- Country: India
- Language: Kannada

Dance Raja Dance is a 1987 Indian Kannada-language dance film, directed and produced by Dwarakish for his Dwarakish Chitra banner. The film stars newcomers Vinod Raj, Divya and Sangeetha.

== Cast ==
- Vinod Raj as Raja
- Divya as Radha
- Sangeeta
- Srinath
- Devaraj
- Sundar Raj
- Keerthiraj
- Ravikiran
- Rathnakar
- Chi. Ravishankar
- Narasimharaju Junior
- Chethan Ramarao
- Negro Johnny
- Pranaya Murthy

== Production ==
For this movie, the climax was shot by helicopter, apart from that they used five cameras to shoot this climax scene. Actually it was Dwarakish's dream to shoot in Mysore from an aerial angle. He dropped that idea due to a financial crisis. But the then Chief minister Ramakrishna Hegde learned of this dream and he helped Dwarakish to do so. He called his minister Siddaramaiah to go to Mysore with a helicopter. He went with the helicopter and told Dwarakish to utilize the helicopter.

== Soundtrack ==
The music was composed by Vijay Anand, with lyrics by Chi. Udaya Shankar and R. N. Jayagopal. Music director A. R. Rahman, who was Dilip then, had assisted Vijay Anand on the keyboards. Around 1988-1990 Telugu and Tamil versions of the film were released.

Kannada Track listing
No.	Title	Lyrics	Singer(s)	Length
1.	"Dance Dance Raja Dance"	Chi. Udaya Shankar	S. P. Balasubrahmanyam
2.	"Elli Neenu Alli Naanu"	R. N. Jayagopal	S. P. Balasubrahmanyam, S. Janaki
3.	"Ee Namma Baale"	Chi. Udaya Shankar	S. P. Balasubrahmanyam, K. S. Chithra
4.	"Om Namah Shivaya"	Chi. Udaya Shankarerai	S. P. Balasubrahmanyam
5.	"Amma Amma"	Chi. Udaya Shankar	S. P. Balasubrahmanyam
6.	"Naa Adalu"	R. N. Jayagopal	S. P. Balasubrahmanyam

All lyrics are written by Rajasri.

Telugu Track list
No.	Title	Singer(s)	Length
1.	"Dance Raja"	S. P. Balasubrahmanyam	4:17
2.	"Naa Naadithe"	S. P. Balasubrahmanyam	4:17
3.	"Ningi Nainu"	S. P. Balasubrahmanyam	4:45
4.	"Amma Amma"	S. P. Balasubrahmanyam	4:59
5.	"Sangeetha Madhurim Naa"	S. P. Balasubrahmanyam, K. S. Chithra	5:00
6.	"Om Namo"	S. P. Balasubrahmanyam	6:05
Total length:			29:23

All lyrics are written by Vairamuthu.

Tamil Track list
No.	Title	Singer(s)	Length
1.	"Dance Dance"	S. P. Balasubrahmanyam	4:21
2.	"Naan Adinaal"	S. P. Balasubrahmanyam	4:16
3.	"Enna Solla"	S. P. Balasubrahmanyam, K. S. Chithra	4:42
4.	"Amma Amma"	S. P. Balasubrahmanyam	4:58
5.	"En Iynba Vaalve"	S. P. Balasubrahmanyam, K. S. Chithra	5:04
6.	"Om Namashivaya"	S. P. Balasubrahmanyam	6:27
Total length:			29:48

== Release and legacy ==
The film was released to positive response by critics and audience and the lead star Vinod Raj was lauded for his dancing skills.

The song "Dance Dance Raja Dance" from this film was included in the popular video game Grand Theft Auto: Liberty City Stories along with few other Indian songs in a radio channel Radio Del Mundo.
