= Pachani Kapuram =

1985 Telugu romantic drama by T. Rama Rao

- Theatrical release poster
- Directed by: T. Rama Rao
- Screenplay by: Satyanand; T. Rama Rao
- Based on: Pyar Jhukta Nahin
- Produced by: Middle Rama Rao
- Starring: Krishna; Sridevi
- Cinematography: A. Venkat
- Edited by: D. Venkataratnam
- Music by: Chakravarthi
- Production company: Sri Raja Lakshmi Art Pictures
- Release date: 6 September 1985
- Country: India
- Language: Telugu

Pachani Kapuram (transl. Green Family) is a 1985 Indian Telugu-language romantic drama film directed by T. Rama Rao. The film stars Krishna and Sridevi, with Jaggayya, Kanta Rao, Sowcar Janaki and Master Arjun in supporting roles. It is a remake of the 1985 Hindi film Pyar Jhukta Nahin.

Chakravarthy scored and composed the film's soundtrack. The film was released on 6 September 1985 and emerged a success.

== Cast ==
- Krishna as Gopi
- Sridevi as Rekha
- Jaggayya as Lakshmi Varaprasada Rao
- Kanta Rao as Ananda Rao
- Sowcar Janaki as Malini
- Master Arjun
- Abhilasha
- Rajya Lakshmi as Jyothi
- P.J. Sarma as Murthy
- Nutan Prasad (Guest Role) as Bhujanga Rao
- Banerjee as Bhujanga Rao's son
- Y. G. Mahendran (Guest Role) as Papa Rao aka Pappu

== Soundtrack ==
Chakravarthi scored and composed the film's soundtrack album. Veturi Sundararama Murthy penned the lyrics. The song "Tumse Milkar" from Pyar Jhukta Nahin was retained here as "Vennelaina Cheekataina"

1. "Koththaga Maththuga" — K. J. Yesudas, S. Janaki
2. "Mukku Meedha Kopam" — P. Susheela
3. "Vennelaina Cheekataina" (Male) — K. J. Yesudas
4. "Vennelaina Cheekataina" (Female) — S. Janaki
5. "Vennelaina Cheekataina" (Duet) — S. Janaki, K. J. Yesudas
6. "Naa Prema Raagam" — K. J. Yesudas, S. Janaki
