= Gowri Kalyana =

Indian romantic drama film

- VCD cover
- Directed by: Dwarakish
- Written by: Kunigal Vasanth (dialogues)
- Screenplay by: Dwarakish
- Story by: K. Bhagyaraj
- Based on: Thooral Ninnu Pochchu (1982)
- Produced by: Dwarakish
- Starring: Harshavardhan; Nithya; M. P. Shankar; Vajramuni
- Cinematography: Karunakara Rao
- Edited by: P R Goutham Raju
- Music by: S. A. Rajkumar
- Production company: Abhilash Enterprises
- Release date: 6 September 1991
- Country: India
- Language: Kannada

Gowri Kalyana (transl. Gowri's marriage) is a 1991 Indian Kannada-language romantic drama film directed, produced, and co-written by Dwarakish. A remake of the Tamil film Thooral Ninnu Pochchu (1982), the films stars Harshavardhan and Nithya with M. P. Shankar and Vajramuni in supporting roles.

== Cast ==
- Harshavardhan as Chandru
- Nithya as Gowri
- M. P. Shankar
- Vajramuni
- Chethan Ramarao
- Honnavalli Krishna
- B. V. Radha
- Vaishali Kasaravalli
- M. N. Lakshmi Devi
- Rekha Das

== Production ==
During the production of Shruthi (1990), Madras-based badminton player Vishwas came to Dwarakish's house in search of film opportunities. He was rechristened as Harshavardhan since Dwarakish had a rift with Vishnuvardhan and wanted to introduce competition while Maria was rechristened as Nithya. M. P. Shankar and Vajramuni were selected to play important roles. Part of the film was shot in Mysore.

== Soundtrack ==
The music was composed by S. A. Rajkumar.

All lyrics are written by R. N. Jayagopal, M N Vyasa Rao, and Chi. Udayashankar.

Track listing
No.	Title	Lyrics	Singer(s)	Length
1.	"Premada Kalpane"	M N Vyasa Rao	S. P. Balasubrahmanyam, K. S. Chithra	4:24
2.	"Mallige Mallige"	R. N. Jayagopal	S. P. Balasubrahmanyam	4:33
3.	"Nodappa Nanage Sikka Maguvanu"	Chi. Udayashankar	S. P. Balasubrahmanyam	4:27
4.	"Preethiyalli Yentha"	R. N. Jayagopal	S. P. Balasubrahmanyam, K. S. Chithra	4:42
5.	"Gowri Kalyana Katheyidu"	Chi. Udayashankar	S. P. Balasubrahmanyam	4:48
Total length:				22:54

== Release ==
Film directors S. Siddalingaiah, Chandulal Jain and B. M. Venkatesh appreciated the film in a screening before its release. Since the film's producers and the people who watched the film during its premiere felt that the film would be a success, Dwarakish did not sell the film's rights to anyone. However, the film was an unexpected failure. Dwarakish cited casting newcomers as a possible reason for the film's failure but said in an interview that he appreciated working with them.
