= Nyaya Ellide =

- VCD cover
- Directed by: S. A. Chandrasekhar
- Written by: Chi. Udayashankar (dialogues)
- Screenplay by: S. A. Chandrashekar
- Story by: Shoba Chandrasekhar
- Based on: Sattam Oru Iruttarai (1981) by S. A. Chandrasekhar
- Produced by: Dwarakish
- Starring: Shankar Nag; Aarathi; Dwarakish; Sangeetha
- Cinematography: D. V. Rajaram; N. K. Satish
- Music by: Chakravarthy
- Production companies: Dwarakish Cinema; DR Films
- Release date: 3 September 1982
- Running time: 134 minutes
- Country: India
- Language: Kannada

Nyaya Ellide (transl. Where is justice?) is a 1983 Indian Kannada-language film directed by S. A. Chandrasekhar. A remake of his own Tamil movie Sattam Oru Iruttarai, the film stars Shankar Nag, Aarathi, Dwarakish, and Sangeetha. It was produced by Dwarakish and Prabhakara Reddy under the banner of DR Films. The film was a success.

According to The Hindu it was one of the 1980s films with revolutionary songs. Dwarakish listed this film alongside his list of eight other films, which he considered his landmark films.

== Plot ==
Inspector Durga lives with her widowed mother and little brother Vijay, who fights for justice whenever he comes across any injustice in society and gets caught by the police. Vijay is frequently at loggerheads with Durga due to his aggressive behaviour.

Vijay's only mission in life is to kill three men: George, Javed and Jagannath. Vijay's father Gopal Rao happened to witness a murder committed by the trio. Despite being arrested and imprisoned, the trio managed to come out of prison and kill Gopal Rao and his family except Vijay, Durga and their mother. When Vijay and Durga approached the police to report the killings, the police brushed them off by stating that the accused were in prison when the murders took place and hence the murder could not have been committed by them. The trio's method of committing the murders with an alibi registers in Vijay's mind and he decides to take vengeance on them in the same way.

However, Durga feels they should be punished legally and takes up the case 15 years after the murders. The trio come to know that the case is reopened and try to kill Durga by planting a bomb in her jeep. Vijay catches Peter, the man who planted the bomb and saves Durga. Peter then becomes an ally of Vijay in his crusade. When Jagannath tries to molest Rekha, a bar dancer who knows Vijay, she saves herself and later tells Vijay that she escaped by knocking out Jagannath's glasses, without which he can hardly see, and Vijay recognises him as one of his father's murderers.

Jagannath is killed by Vijay taking him in his car, removing his glasses and leaving him on the road, where he is run over by vehicles. He then makes George drunk, and mixes poison in his drink to kill him. Javed understands that his friends were murdered by Vijay and decides to challenge him. Meanwhile, Rekha and Vijay marry. Javed reaches the hotel where they are staying and tries to kill Rekha, but escapes.

Infuriated, Vijay tries to kill Javed but Durga, who is aware of Vijay's activities, corners and arrests him. From prison, Vijay works out a plan with Peter, creates his alibi and goes to meet Javed. Durga, who has gone to meet Javed, is caught and tied in a chair. Vijay reaches there, fights Javed and kills him in Durga's presence.

Durga returns to the police station, only to find Vijay is in the lock-up. Durga tries to prove that Vijay had committed the murders. But in the court, she is unable to prove this as Vijay has built a strong alibi, showing he was in the lock-up when the murder took place. Vijay is exonerated due to lack of evidence and leaves with Rekha, but Durga remains determined to apprehend him in the High court.

== Cast ==
- Shankar Nag as Vijay
- Aarathi as Inspector Durga
- Sangeetha as Rekha
- Tiger Prabhakar as Javed
- Sundar Krishna Urs as Jagannath
- Dwarakish as Peter
- Sudheer as George
- Rajanand
- Shivaram
- Kanchana as Durga and Vijay's mother
- Lakshman
- Udaya Kumar

== Soundtrack ==
The music for this movie was given by Chakravarthy. The audio rights were given to Sangeetha, this movie has 5 songs sung by SPB and S. Janaki. The song "Nyaya Ellide" is one of the revolutionary hit song of the 1980s.

1. "Hennu Chenna Thaane" by S. Janaki
2. "Nyaya Ellide" by S. P. Balasubrahmanyam
3. "Nee Kallanu Balu Tuntanu" by S. P. Balasubrahmanyamand S. Janaki
4. "Nanagu Ninagu Ibbarigu Gottu" by S. P. Balasubrahmanyam and S. Janaki
5. "Nyaya Ellide" (pathos) by S. P. Balasubrahmanyam
