= Rayaru Bandaru Mavana Manege =

- Directed by: Dwarakish
- Screenplay by: Dwarakish
- Story by: Priyadarshan
- Produced by: P. Balaram
- Starring: Vishnuvardhan; Bindiya; Dolly Minhas
- Cinematography: Mahendar
- Edited by: Murali Ramaiah
- Music by: Raj–Koti
- Production company: Sri Anupama Productions
- Release date: 26 July 1993
- Running time: 145 minutes
- Country: India
- Language: Kannada

Rayaru Bandaru Mavana Manege is a 1993 Indian Kannada-language romantic drama film directed by Dwarakish and produced by P. Balaram. The film stars Vishnuvardhan along with Dolly Minhas and Bindiya. The music is scored by Raj–Koti and audio by Lahari Music.

The film is a remake of director Priyadarshan's Malayalam film Chithram (1988) starring Mohanlal and Ranjini. Dwarakish who also had the Tamil remake rights exchanged it in lieu of Kannada rights of Mr. India.

== Plot ==
Suma is the only daughter of a rich NRI Ramachandra Raya. Suma lives with Shyam in India. She decides to marry her lover even though he is not accepted by her father. On their wedding day, the groom ditches her as she cannot inherit her father's property. Ramachandra Raya is now ready to accept his new son-in-law and decides to stay with him for a fortnight in his estate. As his health is already in a bad condition, Shyam and Suma do not tell Ramachandra Raya what had happened on the day of her wedding. Shyam comes across Vishnu who is in need of money. He asks him to act like Suma's husband before Ramachandra Raya to which he agrees. Initially Suma and Vishnu keep picking fights with each other. Gradually Suma starts having feelings for Vishnu. After a few days Vishnu has a visitor. He tells Suma and Shyam about Vishnu's past. In the flashback we see that Vishnu was married to a mute teacher Shivaranjini, had a child and lead a happy life. Later an unknown man began visiting his wife while she was alone. This aroused suspicion in Vishnu's mind who one day catches hold of that man and has a fight with him. In this duel, Shivaranjini dies. Later it is revealed that the man was her brother and met her in secret because he was a naxalite. Vishnu lands in jail for killing his wife. Back in the present, Vishnu had escaped from the jail to gather money for his child's surgery. It is revealed that Vishnu's visitor is the jail warden. The warden says that Vishnu is sentenced to death and that nothing could be done about this. After the completion of 14 days vacation, Ramachandra Raya returns back home. In the end we see Suma bidding a tearful goodbye to Vishnu who will be executed soon.

== Cast ==
- Vishnuvardhan as Vishnu, a photographer
- Dolly as Suma
- Bindiya as Shivaranjini
- Dwarakish as Shyam
- C. R. Simha as Ramachandra Rayaru, Suma's father
- Vajramuni as Jailer
- Sihi Kahi Chandru
- Shivakumar
- Vasanth Kunigal
- Junior Narasimharaju
- Bangalore Nagesh

== Soundtrack ==
The music of the film was composed by Raj–Koti. Raj- Koti reused "Adivi deviya" in the Telugu movie Bangaru Bullodu. The soundtrack consisted one Thyagaraja kriti "Nagumomu" performed by K. J. Yesudas

Rayaru Bandaru Mavana Manege

Soundtrack album by Raj–Koti
- Released: 1993
- Genre: Feature film soundtrack
- Label: Lahari Music
- Producer: Raj–Koti

No.	Title	Lyrics	Singer(s)	Length
1.	"Baare Baare Deviye"	M. N. Vyasa Rao	S. P. Balasubrahmanyam, K. S. Chithra
2.	"Adavi Deviya"	M. N. Vyasa Rao	S. P. Balasubrahmanyam, K. S. Chithra
3.	"Muddina Hudugi Chanda"	R. N. Jayagopal	S. P. Balasubrahmanyam, K. S. Chithra
4.	"Aparadhi Naanalla"	R. N. Jayagopal	S. P. Balasubrahmanyam, K. S. Chithra
5.	"Nagumomu"	Thyagaraja	K. J. Yesudas, Poorna Chandar
