= Kulla Agent 000 =

- Directed by: K. S. L. Swamy (Ravi)
- Written by: Dwaraka Films
- Produced by: Ambuja Dwarakish
- Starring: Dwarakish; Udaykumar; Jyothi Lakshmi
- Cinematography: Prakash
- Edited by: Bal G. Yadav
- Music by: Rajan–Nagendra
- Production company: Shastri Associates
- Release date: 1972
- Running time: 129 minutes
- Country: India
- Language: Kannada

Kulla Agent 000 is a 1972 Indian Kannada-language mystery comedy film directed by K. S. L. Swamy and produced and written by Dwaraka Films. The film stars Dwarakish, Udaykumar and Jyothi Lakshmi. It is based on the 1965 Danish film Operation Love Birds (originally Strike First Freddy). The film was later dubbed in Hindi as Miss Chalbaaz (Tingoo Agent 000).

== Cast ==
- Dwarakish
- Jyothi Lakshmi
- Udaykumar
- Vajramuni
- R. Sampath
- Shakti Prasad
- Ranganath
- B. Jaya

== Soundtrack ==
The music of the film was composed by Rajan–Nagendra and lyrics written by Chi. Udaya Shankar. The song "Aadoo Aata Aadoo" was sung by playback singer Kishore Kumar for the first time in Kannada cinema.

Track listing
No.	Title	Singer(s)	Length
1.	"Aadoo Aata Aadoo"	Kishore Kumar
2.	"Eko Eno Ellu Dari"	P. Susheela
3.	"Ella Mayavo Prabhuve"	S. P. Balasubrahmanyam
4.	"Singapoorininda Bande"	S. P. Balasubrahmanyam, L. R. Eswari
5.	"Kulla Agent 000"	S. P. Balasubrahmanyam
