= Seetharam =

Seetharam is a surname and a given name. Notable people with the name include:

- Palakala Seetharam Bhat (1931–2017), Kannada writer
- M. K. Seetharam Kulal (1940–2019), Indian Tulu-Kannada dramatist
- Seetharam Prabhu (born 1964), Indian cricket umpire
- M. R. Seetharam, Indian politician, entrepreneur, educationist and philanthropist
- Nikhil Seetharam (known as Kromatik), Canadian composer and record producer
- T. N. Seetharam (born 1948), Kannada film and TV serial director, actor and screenwriter
- T. P. Seetharam, Indian Civil servant, Indian ambassador to United Arab Emirates
- Thammineni Seetharam, Indian politician from the YSR Congress Party

== See also ==
- Seetharam Benoy Case No. 18, a 2021 Indian Kannada-language suspense thriller
