= Mayor Muthanna =

1969 Indian Kannada-language film

- Directed by: Siddalingaiah
- Story by: Basumani
- Produced by: Ambuja Dwarakeesh
- Starring: Rajkumar; M. P. Shankar; Bharathi; Balakrishna; Kanchana; Thoogudeepa Srinivas
- Cinematography: P. S. Prakash
- Edited by: Bal G. Yadav
- Music by: Rajan–Nagendra
- Production company: Sri Venkateshwara Cinetone
- Distributed by: Dwaraka Films
- Release date: 1969
- Country: India
- Language: Kannada

Mayor Muthanna is a 1969 Indian Kannada-language film directed by Siddalingaiah in his directorial debut. The film stars Dr. Rajkumar and Bharathi. The film was Dwarkish's first independent production venture who had earlier co-produced the 1966 movie Mamatheya Bandhana with two other people under the Thunga Pictures banner. The sub-plot of the film regarding the salvaging of the sub-standard grain was inspired by the 1886 novel The Mayor of Casterbridge by Thomas Hardy. However, apart from this small episode, neither any plot point nor any sequence was borrowed from that novel. The movie was remade in Telugu in 1974 as Chairman Chalamayya starring Chalam.

== Cast ==
- Dr. Rajkumar as Muthanna
- Bharathi Vishnuvardhan as Geetha
- Balakrishna as Ranganath Rao
- B. V. Radha as Shanthi
- M. P. Shankar as Rajappa
- Dwarakish as Ranga
- Thoogudeepa Srinivas as Sudhakar Rao
- Niranjan
- T. B. Nagappa
- Vijayabhanu
- Rajanand as Madhu
- Sriram
- Ashwath Narayan
- H. R. Shastry
- Mahadevappa
- B. M. Venkatesh in a cameo
- M. Jayashree as Kamala
- Renuka
- Kanchana

== Production and release ==
M. G. Ramachandran, who hardly portrayed roles requiring him to consume alcohol, had appeared in one such role in the song "Javvathu Medai" from the 1963 Tamil film Panathottam. Producer Dwarakish wanted Dr. Rajkumar to do a similar sequence. Rajkumar, who like Ramachandran, did not appear in roles requiring him to consume alcohol on-screen, refused to do such a song and hence they incorporated a sequence where he only had to act like as though he has consumed alcohol. Another song "Ayyayyayyo Hallimukha" was shot at HMT swimming pool even though it was raining, since both Rajkumar and Bharathi Vishnuvardhan were supposed to go to Jaipur for the shooting of another film, Sri Krishnadevaraya from the following day.

Mayor Muthanna was made with a budget of ₹1.10 lakh. It was the first Kannada film to be sold to distributors before release. However, the producer had lamented that he did a pre-release business at a very less amount which would give him only a paltry sum of ₹50,000 as profit whereas post release the film did a business of ₹10 lakh.

== Soundtrack ==
The music of the film was composed by the duo Rajan–Nagendra, with lyrics written by Chi. Udaya Shankar.

Track #	Song	Singer(s)
1	"Onde Naadu"	P. B. Sreenivas, S. Janaki
2	"Hello Hello"	L. R. Eswari
3	"Mayor Muthanna"	Dwarakeesh
4	"Haavige Mungusiyuntu"	P. B. Sreenivas, L. R. Eswari, Dwarakeesh
5	"Ayyayyayyo Hallimukka"	L. R. Eswari
6	"Halliyaadarenu Shiva"	P. B. Sreenivas
