= Gedda Maga =

- VCD cover
- Directed by: S. A. Chandrasekhar
- Screenplay by: S. A. Chandrasekhar
- Story by: Peter Selvakumar
- Based on: Moondru Mugam
- Produced by: Dwarakish
- Starring: Shankar Nag
- Cinematography: D. V. Rajaram
- Edited by: Goutham Raju
- Music by: K. Chakravarthy
- Production company: Dwarakish Chitra
- Release date: 14 March 1983
- Country: India
- Language: Kannada

Gedda Maga (transl. Victorious son) is a 1983 Indian Kannada language action film directed by S. A. Chandrasekhar and produced by Dwarakish. A remake of the Tamil film Moondru Mugam (1982), it stars Shankar Nag in a triple role for the first time in his career.

== Plot ==
Arun, the son of a rich businessman, returns to India as a saint shocking his father who hires a female press reporter to bring him back to normal. After a few incidents he renounces his life as a saint. Arun comes to notice his father sending money to an anonymous woman and the pursuit of whom leads to the discovery of his past. He finds that his biological father is Alex Muttanna, an honest police officer, who was murdered by Basappa. He also gets to know about his estranged twin brother, John. Thirsty for revenge, he embarks on a mission to kill Basappa and destroy his criminal empire. However, his plans backfire when comes across the dreaded fact that his twin John works for Basappa. What happens later forms the crux of the story.

== Cast ==
- Shankar Nag as Alex Muttanna, Arun, and John
- Madhavi
- Aarathi
- Silk Smitha
- Dwarakish
- Sundar Krishna Urs as Basappa
- Shivaram
- Sudheer
- M. N. Lakshmi Devi

== Production ==
This film marked the first time that Shankar Nag played three roles.

== Soundtrack ==
The music was composed by K. Chakravarthy. The opening credits feature the theme music of "Ondu Gandu Hennu", a song that talks about the relationship between a man and a woman.

Track listing
No.	Title	Lyrics	Singer(s)	Length
1.	"Ondu Gandu Hennu"	R. N. Jayagopal	S. P. Balasubrahmanyam, S. Janaki	6:07
2.	"Ravigintha Shashiye"	R. N. Jayagopal	S. P. Balasubrahmanyam, S. Janaki	4:00
3.	"Minchanthe Minchi"	Doddarangegowda	S. P. Balasubrahmanyam, S. Janaki	4:23
4.	"Love Me Allow Me"	Shyamsundar Kulkarni	S. P. Balasubrahmanyam, S. Janaki	4:29
5.	"Benkiyanu Muttuveya"	Chi. Udayashankar	Ramesh, S. Janaki	4:12
Total length:				23:11

== Box office ==
Unlike the original, Gedda Magga performed average at the box office after releasing to high expectations, though Dwarakish did not lose money through the film.
