= Guru Shishyaru (1981 film) =

- VCD cover
- Directed by: H. R. Bhargava
- Written by: Chi. Udaya Shankar (dialogues & Lyrics)
- Story by: Vempati Sadasivabrahmam
- Produced by: Dwarakish
- Starring: Vishnuvardhan; Manjula; Dwarakish
- Cinematography: D. V. Rajaram
- Edited by: Yadav Victor
- Music by: K. V. Mahadevan
- Production company: Dwarakish Chitra
- Release date: 20 August 1981
- Running time: 148 minutes
- Country: India
- Language: Kannada

Guru Shishyaru ( transl. Mentor and disciples) is a 1981 Indian Kannada-language devotional comedy drama film directed by H. R. Bhargava and produced by Dwarakish under his "Dwarakish Chitra" production house.

The story follows a fictional Guru and his seven disciples who are cursed by the angels to behave stupidly until the angel gets married. The film had an ensemble cast along with lead pair Vishnuvardhan and Manjula. The film is a remake of 1966 Telugu film Paramanandayya Sishyula Katha, which itself was a remake of 1950 Telugu film Paramanandayya Sishyulu. The film was dubbed into Tamil as Raja Mohini.

== Cast ==
- Vishnuvardhan as Nandivardhana Maharaja
- Manjula as Chitralekha
- Rajanand as Rajaguru Poornanandaiah
- Dwarakish as Nandishwara (disciple 1)
- Shivaram as Vishwa (disciple 2)
- Bangalore Nagesh as Subramanya (disciple 3)
- M. S. Umesh as Someshwara (disciple 4)
- Rathnakar as Sundareswara (disciple 5)
- Gode Lakshminarayana as Ganapati (disciple 6)
- Sai Kumar as Bringishwra (disciple 7)
- Lokanath as Maharshi
- Srinivasa Murthy as Lord Shiva
- Hema Choudhary as Goddess Parvathi
- Cudavalli Chandrashekar as singer (Cameo)
- Jayamalini as Ranjini Royal Dancer
- Satyabhama as Poornanandaiah's wife
- Thoogudeepa Srinivas as Minister of Kingdom
- Sundar Krishna Urs as leader of robber gang
- Musuri Krishnamurthy as Parabramha Shastri
- Balakrishna as Virupaksha Shastri
- Lakshman as thief
- Chetanram Rao as Manjunataiah
- Pranava murthy as Narasimhaiah, Manjunathaiah Son

== Soundtrack ==
The music was composed by K. V. Mahadevan, with lyrics by Chi. Udaya Shankar. The comedy song "Doddavarella Jaanaralla" was received extremely well.

Track listing
No.	Title	Singer(s)	Length
1.	"Doddavarella Jaanaralla"	S. P. Balasubrahmanyam, chorus
2.	"Jaya Jaya Samba Sadashiva"	S. Janaki
3.	"Ninagagi Ella Ninagagi"	S. P. Balasubrahmanyam, S. Janaki
4.	"Deenala Moreya"	S. Janaki, P. Susheela
5.	"Naachi Odidanu Madana"	S. P. Balasubrahmanyam, S. Janaki
