= Asadhya Aliya =

1979 Kannada film produced by Udaya Chandrika

- Directed by: H. R. Bhargava
- Written by: M. D. Sundar
- Screenplay by: M. D. Sundar
- Produced by: Udaya Chandrika
- Starring: Vishnuvardhan; Padmapriya; Maanu; Dwarakish
- Cinematography: Chittibabu
- Edited by: P. Bhakthavathsalam
- Music by: G. K. Venkatesh
- Production company: Chandrika Films
- Distributed by: Chandrika Films
- Release date: 12 March 1979
- Running time: 144 min
- Country: India
- Language: Kannada

Asadhya Aliya is a 1979 Indian Kannada-language film, directed by H. R. Bhargava and produced by Udaya Chandrika. The film stars Vishnuvardhan, Padmapriya, Maanu and Dwarakish. The film has musical score by G. K. Venkatesh. The movie was remade in Telugu in 1981 by K. S. R. Das as Mayadari Alludu starring Krishna.

== Cast ==
- Vishnuvardhan as Ashok
- Padmapriya as Aruna
- Maanu as Shekar
- K. Vijaya as Lalitha
- Uma Shivakumar as Shanta
- Dwarakish as Sathyananda
- T. N. Balakrishna as Krishnappa
- Narasimharaju as Nithyananda
- Shakti Prasad
- Dheerendra Gopal as Chellam
- Badrachalam
- Shivaprakash
- Bhatti Mahadevappa
- Hanumanthachar
- Ramkumar
- H. P. Saroja
- Susheela Naidu
- Halam

== Soundtrack ==
The music was composed by G. K. Venkatesh with lyrics for soundtrack written by Chi. Udayashankar and Doddarangegowda.

No.	Song	Singers	Lyrics	Length (m:ss)
1	"Devanu Thanda Yee Anubandha"	P. Susheela	Chi. Udayashankar	03:31
2	"Guru Neene"	S. P. Balasubrahmanyam	Chi. Udaya Shankar	03:14
3	"Kannalli Kanna Ittu"	P. B. Sreenivas, S. P. Balasubrahmanyam	Chi. Udaya Shankar	04:55
4	"Kannalli Neenu"	S. P. Balasubrahmanyam, S. Janaki	Chi. Udaya Shankar	04:55
5	"Ninnallondu Hosathanava"	S. Janaki	Chi. Udaya Shankar	02:57
6	"Oh My Darling"	S. Janaki	Doddarangegowda	03:03
