= Giddu Dada =

Indian Kannada-language heist comedy drama film

- VCD cover
- Directed by: Dwarakish
- Written by: Dwarakish
- Based on: Victoria No. 203 (1972)
- Produced by: M. P. Shankar
- Starring: Malashri; Ramkumar; Dwarakish; M. P. Shankar
- Cinematography: B. S. Shastry
- Edited by: Victor Yadav
- Music by: Rajan–Nagendra
- Production company: Bharani Chitra
- Release date: 11 August 1995
- Running time: 142 minutes
- Country: India
- Language: Kannada

Giddu Dada is a 1995 Indian Kannada-language heist comedy drama film directed by Dwarakish and produced by M. P. Shankar. It is loosely inspired by the Hindi film, Victoria No. 203 (1972). Besides Dwarakish and M. P. Shankar, the film stars Malashri and Ramkumar in lead roles.

The film's music was composed by Rajan–Nagendra and the audio was launched on the T-Series banner.

== Cast ==
- Dwarakish
- Malashri
- Ramkumar
- M. P. Shankar
- Shobhraj
- Sihi Kahi Chandru
- Ashok Rao
- Aravind
- Chethan Ramarao
- Sriraksha
- Lakshmi Bhat

== Soundtrack ==
The music of the film was composed by Rajan–Nagendra.

Track listing
No.	Title	Lyrics	Singer(s)	Length
1.	"Thalava Keladu"	Shyamsundar Kulkarni	K. S. Chithra
2.	"Thalava Keladu"	Shyamsundar Kulkarni	S. P. Balasubrahmanyam
3.	"Chinna Ninna Gallada Mele"	Su. Rudramurthy Shastry	S. P. Balasubrahmanyam, K. S. Chithra
4.	"Premavendigu Shashwatha"	M. N. Vyasa Rao	K. S. Chithra
5.	"O Nanna Giddu"	V. Manohar	S. P. Balasubrahmanyam
6.	"Nee Thumbi Ninte"	M. N. Vyasa Rao	S. P. Balasubrahmanyam, K. S. Chithra
