= Dwarakish =

Indian actor, director and producer (1942–2024)

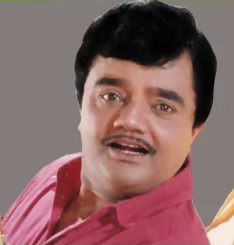
- Dwarakish in 1994 Kannada film Kiladigalu
- Born: Bungle Shama Rao Dwarakanath; 19 August 1942; Hunsur, Kingdom of Mysore
- Died: 16 April 2024 (aged 81); Bengaluru, Karnataka, India
- Occupations: Actor; director; producer; screenwriter
- Years active: 1963–2024
- Works: Full list
- Spouses: Ambuja (died 2021); Shailaja (m. 1993)
- Children: 6; including Giri
- Relatives: Hunsur Krishnamurthy (uncle)
- Website: dwarakishchitra.com

Bungle Shama Rao Dwarakanath (19 August 1942 – 16 April 2024), known by his stage name Dwarakish (/ˈdwɑːrkɪʃ/ DWAR-kish), was an Indian actor, comedian and filmmaker who predominantly worked in Kannada cinema in addition to few Tamil and Hindi films. Starting his career as a supporting actor in Veera Sankalpa (1964) and co-producer for the film Mamatheya Madilu in 1966, Dwarakish went on to work over five decades in cinema. He debuted as a director with the film Nee Bareda Kadambari (1985).

Fondly remembered as "Karnatakada Kulla" (lit. 'Dwarf of Karnataka'), Dwarakish produced over 50 films under his home production called "Dwarakish Chitra". Mayor Muthanna (1969) was the first film to be produced under his banner. He is referred to be the "First showman of Kannada cinema" for his daring and lavish experiments and his films were known for grand sets, songs and exotic locations.

He appeared in more than 200 films starting 1962. In 1969, he founded Dwarakish Chitra, and produced more than 50 films, while also directing 25 films. In addition to Kannada, Dwarakish also worked on Tamil and Hindi films. Many films that he worked as a director and/or producer were remake films.

== Early life ==
Dwarakish was born on 19 August 1942. He grew up in Ittigegud, Mysore. He received his primary education in Sharada Vilas and Banumaiah's school, and he graduated from CPC Polytechnic with a Diploma in Automobile Engineering. After completing his education, Dwarakish and his brother started an automotive spare-parts business called "Bharath Auto Spares" in Gandhi Square, Mysore. He was strongly attracted to acting and often asked his maternal uncle, a famous cinema director Hunusur Krishnamurthy, to give him a chance to act in movies. In 1963, he decided to quit business and start acting in movies. He was rechristened as Dwarakish by director C. V. Shivashankar.

== Film career ==
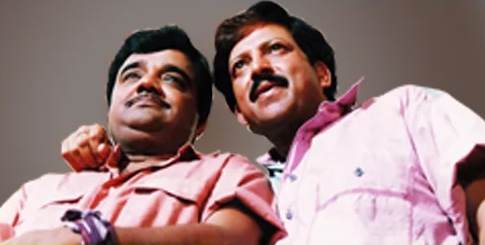
Dwarakish, Vishnuvardhan in 1994 Kannada film Kiladigalu

=== Actor ===
Dwarkish started his film journey by doing a small role, that of a prince in the film Veera Sankalpa (1964) directed by his uncle Hunsur Krishnamurthy. Later he did small roles in Maduve Madi Nodu (1965) and Satya Harischandra (1965).

As an actor, he was known to play comedic roles, and his early films saw his frequently appear alongside T. N. Balakrishna and Narasimharaju. Dwarakish generally capitalised on his short stature to build his characters.

=== Producer ===
In 1966, Dwarakish co-produced Mamatheya Bandhana with two others under the banner of Thunga Pictures. In 1969, his first independent production Mayor Muthanna starring Dr. Rajkumar and Bharathi Vishnuvardhan in the lead roles was a box office success. After Mayor Muthanna, Dwarakish delivered a series of box office successes as producer, one after the other for the next two decades.

Singaporenalli Raja Kulla (1978), which he produced and starred in, was the first Kannada film to be shot outside India. Dwarakish was known for his frequent collaborations with Vishnuvardhan both as actor and producer in films such as Kalla Kulla (1975), Kittu Puttu (1977), Guru Shishyaru and Apthamitra (2004). Other than Kannada, he produced two Tamil films, Adutha Varisu (1983) and Naan Adimai Illai (1986), both starring Rajinikanth and Sridevi. He produced two Hindi films including Gangvaa (1984). After a string of 19 commercial failures, he found success with Apthamitra. Ayushman Bhava was the last film he produced before his death in 2024.

Dwarakish was the first Kannada producer to introduce Kishore Kumar to the Kannada film industry via the film Kulla Agent 000, and the song "Aadu Aata Aadu" became popular.

=== Director ===
From the year 1985, Dwarakish started directing movies; his first movie as a director was Nee Bareda Kadambari. He went on to direct movies for other producers. Behind the camera, Dwarakish was successful. As a director, he created movies such as Dance Raja Dance, Nee Bareda Kadambari, Shruthi, Shruthi Haakidha Hejje, Rayaru Bandaru Mavana Manege and Kilaadigalu.

Dwarakish Chitra faced problems after the failure of some movies. With huge losses from box office failures, Dwarakish was written off by his own colleagues and the entire film industry. Despite failures, Dwarakish did not despair. He continued to make movies introducing new faces to Kannada cinema.

As a producer, he introduced many new actors, actresses, directors, and technicians into cinema. Whom all consider him to be their "Godfather". Dwarakish produced Apthamitra in the year 2004 which ended up as a massive success.

== Death ==
Dwarakish died from cardiac arrest in Bengaluru, on 16 April 2024, at the age of 81.

== Records and awards ==
Produced First Kannada movie to be shot outside India. Apthamitra created records in Kannada Cinema. It was the first Kannada movie to celebrate screening for one year in two theatres, at Santosh in Bangalore and at Ranajith in Mysore and was the first Kannada movie to successfully complete one year of screening with four shows daily.

Dwarakish received an NTR Award.

== Filmography ==
=== Acting roles ===
Year	Title	Role	Notes	Ref(s)
1964	Veera Sankalpa			
1965	Maduve Madi Nodu	Simhadri		
1965	Satya Harishchandra	Disciple of Kalakoushika		
1966	Sri Kanyaka Parameshwari Kathe			
1966	Mamatheya Bandhana			
1966	Mane Katti Nodu	Shankar		
1966	Endu Ninnavane			
1967	Sri Purandara Dasaru	Jeshtachari		
1967	Belli Moda	Papayya		
1967	Dhana Pishachi	Dwarakish		
1967	Lagna Pathrike	Ganesha		
1968	Bhagyada Bagilu	Hanumantha		
1968	Adda Dari			
1968	Manku Dinne			
1968	Bedi Bandavalu	Ramakrishna		
1968	Gandhinagara	Prabhakara		
1968	Arunodaya			
1968	Anna Thamma			
1968	Pravasi Mandira			
1968	Lakshadheeshwara			
1969	Shiva Bhaktha	Mutha		
1969	Kaanike			
1969	Kannu Muchhale			
1969	Mayor Muthanna	Ranga		
1969	Mallammana Pavaada	Shivalingi		
1969	Vichithra Samsara	Mangesh		
1969	Ellellu Nane			
1969	Niraparadhi			
1969	Kadina Rahasya			
1970	Arishina Kumkuma	Gundu Rao		
1970	Baalu Belagithu	Kitti		
1970	C.I.D. Rajanna	Mallanna		
1970	Mooru Mutthugalu			
1970	Mr. Rajkumar	Shekhar		
1970	Vagdana			
1971	Sidila Mari			
1971	Sri Krishna Rukmini Satyabhama	Makaranda		
1971	Bhale Adrushtavo Adrushta	Nanjundi		
1971	Thayi Devaru	Puttu Rao		
1971	Nyayave Devaru	Mukunda		
1971	Baala Bandana	Vishwanath		
1971	Sothu Geddavalu			
1971	Bethala Gudda			
1971	Thande Makkalu			
1972	Nanda Gokula			
1972	Janma Rahasya			
1972	Vishakanye			
1972	Kranti Veera			
1972	Bangaarada Manushya	Shivalingu		
1972	Kulla Agent 000			
1972	Uttara Dakshina	Peter		
1973	CID 72			
1973	Devaru Kotta Thangi			
1973	Doorada Betta			
1973	Cow Boy Kulla			
1973	Mane Belagida Sose			
1974	Professor Huchuraya	Thimma		
1974	Gruhini			
1974	Maga Mommaga			
1974	Anna Attige	Shyam		
1974	Bhakta Kumbara	Gopi		
1974	Nanoo Balabeku			
1975	Kalla Kulla	Kulla		
1975	Mahadeshwara Pooja Phala			
1975	Koodi Balona			
1975	Manthra Shakthi			
1975	Aasha Soudha			
1976	Makkala Bhagya	Sundara		
1976	Soothrada Bombe			
1976	Bahaddur Gandu	Panju's friend		
1976	Hudugatada Hudugi			
1976	Hosilu Mettida Hennu			
1976	Bengaluru Bootha			
1976	Punardattha			
1976	Vijaya Vani			
1976	Idu Namma Desha			
1976	Apoorva Kanasu			
1977	Devara Duddu	Balu		
1977	Sri Renuka Devi Mahatme			
1977	Pavana Ganga	Shreepathi		
1977	Sose Tanda Soubhagya	Dattatreya		
1977	Kittu Puttu	Puttu		
1977	Dhanalakshmi			
1977	Bhagyavantharu	Subbu		
1977	Galate Samsara	Muthanna		
1977	Shrimanthana Magalu	Kumar		
1977	Sahodarara Savaal	Raja		
1977	Kadgicchu			
1977	Karthavyada Kare			
1977	Shubhashaya			
1977	Ganda Hendathi			
1978	Singaporenalli Raja Kulla	Gopinath		
1978	Bhale Huduga	Shreerama / Balarama / Parashurama	Triple role	
1978	Maathu Tappada Maga	Mohan		
1978	Madhura Sangama	Kapanipathy		
1978	Halli Haida			
1978	Vamsha Jyothi	Virupaksha		
1978	Siritanakke Savaal	Chikkayya		
1978	Anuraga Bandhana			
1978	Kiladi Jodi			
1978	Vasantha Lakshmi			
1978	Balu Aparoopa Nam Jodi			
1979	Asadhya Aliya	Sathyananda		
1979	Naniruvude Ninagagi	John / Vincent	Dual role	
1979	Preethi Madu Thamashe Nodu	Sundara		
1979	Urvashi Neene Nanna Preyasi			
1979	Adalu Badalu	LTV Prasanna		
1979	Aliya Devaru			
1979	Vijay Vikram			
1980	Usha Swayamvara	Himself	Cameo	
1980	Manku Thimma	Thimma		
1980	Haddina Kannu	Dose Damodara		
1980	Auto Raja	Raja's friend		
1980	Point Parimala	Vamana		
1980	Nyaya Neethi Dharma	Puttanna		
1980	Kulla Kulli	Krishna "Kulla"		
1981	Mane Mane Kathe	Tharle Thammayya		
1981	Simhada Mari Sainya	Himself		
1981	Kula Puthra	Gopi		
1981	Avala Hejje			
1981	Guru Shishyaru	Shishya		
1981	Garjane	Madappa		
1981	Jeevakke Jeeva	Thippe		
1981	Chaya			
1981	Prachanda Putanigalu	Himself		
1981	Number Aidoo Ekka			
1982	Pedda Gedda			
1982	Karmika Kallanalla	Krishnamurthy		
1982	Jimmy Gallu	Vasantha		
1982	Prema Mathsara	Kiran		
1982	Nyaya Ellide	Peter		
1982	Shankar Sundar			
1982	Adrushtavantha			
1982	Mava Sose Saval			
1982	Snehada Sankole			
1982	Oorige Upakari		Cameo appearance	
1983	Geluvu Nannade	Krishnamurthy aka Kittu		
1983	Gedda Maga	Chitragupta		
1984	Prachanda Kulla	Rama		
1984	Police Papanna	Papanna		
1985	Balondu Uyyale			
1985	Brahma Gantu			
1986	Africadalli Sheela	Dr. Ram Seth		
1986	Madhuve Madu Tamashe Nodu	Mohan		
1988	Ganda Mane Makkalu			
1992	Hosa Kalla Hale Kulla			
1993	Hendthi Helidare Kelabeku	Eeshwarayya		
1993	Server Somanna		Cameo appearance	
1993	Muddina Maava			
1993	Rayaru Bandaru Mavana Manege	Shyam		
1993	Aaha Brahmachari			
1994	Mandyada Gandu		Cameo appearance	
1994	Kiladigalu	Puttappa / Hari	Dual role	
1994	Rasika			
1995	Kidnap			
1995	Giddu Dada			
1995	Thaliya Sowbhagya			
1995	Hello Sister			
1996	Balina Jyothi			
1996	Hrudaya Kallaru			
1997	Shruthi Hakida Hejje			
1997	Enoondre			
2000	Yare Nee Abhimani	Gundlupete Gundanna		
2001	Yarige Beda Duddu			
2001	Sri Manjunatha	Bhrungi		
2001	Chitte	Truck driver		
2002	Boothayyana Makkalu			
2003	Ananda			
2003	Neenilde Nanu Illa Kane	Chandru		
2003	Fifty:Fifty			
2003	Khushi			
2003	Gadibidi Brothers			
2003	Dreams			
2004	Swetha Naagu	Ashok Kumar		
2004	Baithare Baithare			
2004	Kanasina Loka			
2004	Apthamitra	Mukunda		
2004	Thali Kattuva Shubhavele			
2006	Jothe Jotheyali	Divya's father		
2008	Premigagi Naa			
2009	Anjadiru	Loki		
2009	Eshtu Nagthi Nagu			
2009	Dubai Babu	Doddanna		
2009	Kalakar	Film director		
2009	Cheluvina Chilipili			
2009	Ravana			
2010	Bisile			
2010	Karavali Hudugi			
2011	Vishnuvardhana	Colonel		
2014	Maanikya	Himself	Special appearance in song "Mani Mani Maanikya"	
2015	Aatagara			
2017	Chowka	Himself	Special appearance in song "Alladsu Alladsu"	
2023	Mayanagari	Dwarakish		

=== Directing, producing, and writing credits ===
Year	Title	Director	Producer	Writer	Notes	Ref(s)
1966	Mamatheya Bandhana	No	Yes	No	Co-producer	
1969	Mayor Muthanna	No	Yes	No		
1972	Kulla Agent 000	No	Yes	No		
1973	Cowboy Kulla	No	Yes	No		
1977	Bhagyavantharu	No	Yes	No		
1977	Kittu Puttu	No	Yes	No		
1978	Singaporenalli Raja Kulla	No	Yes	No		
1979	Preethi Madu Thamashe Nodu	No	Yes	No		
1980	Kulla Kulli	No	Yes	No		
1980	Manku Thimma	No	Yes	No		
1981	Guru Shishyaru	No	Yes	No		
1981	Mane Mane Kathe	No	Yes	No		
1982	Pedda Gedda	No	Yes	No		
1982	Adrushtavantha	No	Yes	No		
1982	Nyaya Ellide	No	Yes	No		
1983	Gedda Maga	No	Yes	No		
1983	Ananda Bhairavi	No	Yes	No	Bi-lingual film (Kannada, Telugu); Kannada version only	
1983	Adutha Varisu	No	Yes	No	Tamil film	
1984	Prachanda Kulla	No	Yes	No		
1984	Police Papanna	No	Yes	No		
1984	Indina Ramayana	No	Yes	No		
1984	Gangvaa	No	Yes	No	Hindi film	
1984	Madhuve Madu Tamashe Nodu	No	Yes	No		
1985	Nee Bareda Kadambari	Yes	Yes	No		
1985	Nee Thanda Kanike	Yes	Yes	Screenplay		
1985	Brahma Gantu	No	Yes	No		
1986	Naan Adimai Illai	Yes	Yes	Screenplay	Tamil film	
1986	Africadalli Sheela	Yes	Yes	Yes		
1987	Kizhakku Africavil Sheela	Yes	Yes	Yes	Tamil film	
1987	Sheela	No	Yes	Story	Hindi film	
1987	Dance Raja Dance	Yes	Yes	Yes		
1987	Onde Goodina Hakkigalu	No	Yes	No		
1987	Ravana Rajya	No	Yes	No		
1988	Ganda Mane Makkalu	No	Yes	No		
1989	Jai Karnataka	Yes	Yes	Yes		
1989	Krishna Nee Kunidaga	Yes	Yes	Yes		
1990	Shruthi	Yes	Yes	Screenplay		
1991	Gowri Kalyana	Yes	Yes	Screenplay		
1992	Hosa Kalla Hale Kulla	Yes	Yes	No		
1993	Rayaru Bandaru Mavana Manege	Yes	No	Screenplay		
1994	Rasika	Yes	No	Yes		
1994	Kiladigalu	Yes	No	Yes		
1995	Kidnap	Yes	Yes	Yes		
1995	Giddu Dada	Yes	No	Yes		
1996	Hrudaya Kallaru	Yes	Yes	No		
1997	Shruthi Hakida Hejje	Yes	No	No		
2001	Majnu	Yes	Yes	Screenplay		
2004	Apthamitra	No	Yes	No	Filmfare Award for Best Film – Kannada	
2011	Vishnuvardhana	No	Yes	No		
2012	Chaarulatha	No	Yes	No	Bi-lingual film (Kannada, Tamil)	
2015	Aatagara	No	Yes	No		
2017	Chowka	No	Yes	No	Nominated—Filmfare Award for Best Film – Kannada; Nominated—SIIMA Award for Best Film – Kannada	
2018	Amma I Love You	No	Yes	No		
2019	Ayushman Bhava	No	Yes	No		
