= Loknath =

Indian actor (1927 - 2018)

- Born: 14 August 1927; Bengaluru
- Died: 31 December 2018 (aged 91); Bangalore
- Occupation: Actor
- Writing career
- Years active: 1969–2018

C. H. Loknath (14 August 1927 – 31 December 2018) was an Indian actor who made more than 1000 Kannada plays and 650 films. Loknath is affectionately known as "Uncle Loknath" or "Uppinakayi" in the industry. His last performance was in a Star Suvarna Channel's TV series titled Priyadarshini.

== Biography ==
Some of the characters he has played are Galileo in Galileo, Rajaram in Aspota, Dr. Faustus in Dr. Faustus, Kakaji in Tanavu Ninnade Manavu Ninnade, and Dushtabudhi in Chandrahasa. His most famous films include Bhootayyana Maga Ayyu, Collegu Ranga, Naagarahaavu, Katha Sangama, Hosa Neeru, Singapurinalli Raja Kulla, Minchina Ota and Mane Mane Kathe. He has also acted in one episode ("Sweets for Angels") of Malgudi Days.

C. H. Loknath died after a brief illness on 31 December 2018, aged 91.

== Partial filmography ==
- 1970 – Samskara
- 1969 – Gejje Pooje
- 1972 – Hrudaya Sangama
- 1972 – Bangaarada Manushya
- 1972 – Naagarahaavu
- 1974 – Bhootayyana Maga Ayyu
- 1974 – Bangaarada Panjara
- 1976 – Katha Sangama
- 1976 – Naa Ninna Mareyalare
- 1977 – Kittu Puttu
- 1978 – Kakana Kote
- 1978 – Singaporenalli Raja Kulla
- 1978 – Premayana...Colonel Rao
- 1980 – Minchina Ota
- 1980 – Aruna Raaga
- 1981 – Edeyuru Siddalingeshwara Mahatme
- 1981 – Guru Shishyaru
- 1983 – Eradu Nakshatragalu
- 1985 – Karthavya
- 1986 – Ee Jeeva Ninagagi
- 1986 – Hosa Neeru
- 1986 – Guri (1986 Film)
- 1988 – Pushpaka Vimana
- 1988 – Olavina Aasare
- 1989 – Yuga Purusha
- 1992 – Belliyappa Bangarappa
- 1992 – Megha Mandara
- 1994 – Chinna
- 1995 – Thumbida Mane
- 1995 – Beladingala Baale
- 1997 – Ammavra Ganda
- 1997 – Ellaranthalla Nanna Ganda
- 1999 – Premachari
- 2000 – Bhoomi
- 2002 – Dakota Express
- 2004 – Saradara
- 2006 – Aishwarya
- 2006 – Shubham
- 2007 – Kaada Beladingalu
- 2008 – Hani Hani
- 2008 – Anthu Inthu Preethi Banthu
- 2009 – Prem Kahani
- 2009 – Iniya
- 2012 – AK 56
- 2012 – Bheema Theeradalli
- 2013 – Mahanadi
- 2015 - Priyadarshini
- 2016 – ...Re

== Television series ==
- Malgudi Days
