= Nee Bareda Kadambari =

- VCD cover
- Directed by: Dwarakish
- Produced by: Dwarakish
- Starring: Vishnuvardhan; Bhavya; C. R. Simha
- Cinematography: R. Deviprasad
- Edited by: Gautham Raju
- Music by: Vijay Anand
- Production company: Dwarakish Chitra
- Release date: 19 June 1985
- Running time: 136 minutes
- Country: India
- Language: Kannada

Nee Bareda Kadambari (transl. The novel you wrote) is a 1985 Indian Kannada-language romantic drama film directed and produced by Dwarakish in his directorial debut. The film stars Vishnuvardhan, Bhavya, and C. R. Simha. The music was composed by Vijay Anand and the dialogues and lyrics were written by Chi. Udaya Shankar along with R. N. Jayagopal. The film is a remake of the Hindi film Pyar Jhukta Nahin (1985). Dwarakish also directed the Tamil remake Naan Adimai Illai.

== Plot ==
Ajay Kumar is a professional photographer from a middle-class background, who falls in love with a rich girl, Prema, whose father is Ram Narayan, a class-conscious man. They are stubborn in their love and marry against her parents' wishes. But soon the marriage is on the rocks due to the difference in their backgrounds, with the wily Ram Narayan playing his cards very well to split his daughter from Vijay. They have a fight and Prema goes back to her parents' house and Ram Narayan coerces her to file for divorce from Ajay Kumar. After a few days, Prema visits the doctor for a stomach-ache and learns that she is pregnant. An elated Prema is ready to mend fences with Ajay Kumar and wants to tell him the news, but is blocked by her dad who has fixed her remarriage with someone else. She gives her dad the slip and goes to Ajay Kumar's house, just to find out that he vacated the place recently.

Later Ajay Kumar is in a hospital to visit his friend and Prema is brought to the same hospital with labour pains. Ajay Kumar is thrilled and tries to talk to Prema, but Ram Narayan tells Ajay Kumar that he will give him the baby on the condition that he promises he will never see Prema again and Ajay Kumar agrees. Prema gives birth to a son and Ajay Kumar takes him away. Prema's father tells her that the baby was stillborn. She is dejected and loses her mental balance and thinks that her son is still alive. Ajay Kumar brings up his son away from Prema's family. Many years later, Prema who is seriously depressed and always carries a doll assuming it to be her son, is unknowingly brought by her parents close to where Ajay Kumar lives and gets acquainted with a boy in the neighbourhood. The boy turns out to be her son and he leads Prema to reunite with Ajay Kumar.

== Cast ==
- Vishnuvardhan as Ajay Kumar
- Bhavya as Prema
- Hema Chaudhary as Kamakshi
- C. R. Simha as Ram Narayan
- Master Arjun as Vijay
- Sundar Raj as Jackie
- Uma Shivakumar as Meenakshi
- Lohithaswa as Moorthy
- Umesh Hegde

== Soundtrack ==
The music was composed by Vijay Anand.

Song	Singers	Lyrics	Length
"Nee Meetida Nenapellavu"	S. Janaki, S. P. Balasubrahmanyam	R. N. Jayagopal	04:44
"Nee Meetida"	S. Janaki	R. N. Jayagopal	06:16
"Ee Prema Hithavagide"	S. P. Balasubrahmanyam, Manjula	R. N. Jayagopal	05:14
"Nee Meetida"	S. P. Balasubrahmanyam	R. N. Jayagopal	04:26
"Surya Chandra Aakashake"	S. P. Balasubrahmanyam, Manjula	Chi. Udaya Shankar	04:30
