= Bedi Bandavalu =

- Directed by: C. Srinivasan
- Screenplay by: Smt Neeladevi
- Based on: Jane Eyre by Charlotte Brontë
- Produced by: T. N. Srinivasan
- Starring: Kalyan Kumar; Chandrakala; Dwarakish
- Cinematography: Vijaya Nanjappa
- Edited by: G. Veluswamy
- Music by: R. Sudarsanam
- Production company: Srinivas Art Productions
- Release date: 21 May 1968
- Running time: 154 minutes
- Country: India
- Language: Kannada

Bedi Bandavalu is a 1968 Indian Kannada-language film, directed by C. Srinivasan and produced by T. N. Srinivasan. The film stars Kalyan Kumar and Chandrakala in the lead roles. The film has music by R. Sudarsanam. It is inspired by the 1847 novel Jane Eyre by Charlotte Brontë.

== Cast ==
- Kalyan Kumar
- Dwarakish as Ramakrishna
- Ramen Rao
- Rajaram Giriyan
- Shyamsundar
- Sahyadri
- Master Gopal
- Srirangamurthy
- Lakshman Rao
- Venkataram
- Chandrakala
- Shailashree
- Kamalamma
- Malathamma
- Indrani
- A. Lalitha
- Radha
- Rama
- Kavitha
- Baby Sunanda
- Baby Roja Ramani
- Baby Padmashree
- Baby Prema
- Baby Jayanthi
- B. Jayamma in Guest Appearance
- Ranga in Guest Appearance

== Soundtrack ==
The music was composed by R. Sudarsanam. The song "Neerinalli" was remixed in a film called Gubbi (2010).

| Song | Singers | Lyrics | Length (m:ss) |
|---|---|---|---|
| "Neerinalli Alaya Ungura" | P. B. Sreenivas, P. Susheela | R. N. Jayagopal | 03:42 |
| "Yeluswaravu Seri" | P. Susheela | R. N. Jayagopal | 03:30 |
