= Adda Dari =

- Directed by: Hunsur Krishnamurthy
- Written by: Hunsur Krishnamurthy
- Produced by: Hunsur Krishnamurthy
- Starring: B. M. Venkatesh
- Cinematography: K. Govinda Swamy
- Edited by: R. Rajan
- Music by: Rajan–Nagendra
- Production company: Evergreen Productions
- Release date: 1968
- Running time: 138 minutes
- Country: India
- Language: Kannada

Adda Dari is a 1968 Indian Kannada film written, directed and produced by Hunsur Krishnamurthy. The film has musical score by Rajan–Nagendra.

== Cast ==
- B. M. Venkatesh
- Dwarakish
- Lokesh
- Rama
- Sathyavathi
- Janaki
- Hunsur Krishnamurthy
- Rajanand

== Soundtrack ==
Track listing
No.	Title	Lyrics	Singer(s)	Length
1.	"Nanna Ninna Kannu Seridande"	Hunsur Krishnamurthy	P. Nageshwar Rao
2.	"Maduve Gandamma Nodamma"	Hunsur Krishnamurthy	L. R. Eswari
3.	"Thalu Thalelo Rangayya"	Purandaradasa	S. Janaki
4.	"Aadise Thangi Aadise Akka"	Hunsur Krishnamurthy	L. R. Eswari, S. Janaki
5.	"Kudukarella Huccharalla"	Hunsur Krishnamurthy	P. B. Sreenivas
6.	"Ecchara Thangi Ecchara"	Hunsur Krishnamurthy	P. B. Sreenivas
