= Kalla Kulla =

- VCD cover
- Directed by: K. S. R. Das
- Written by: M. D. Sundar
- Produced by: C. V. L. Shastry; D. T. S. Rao; D. S. Narasinga Rao; Y. R. Ashwath Narayan
- Starring: Vishnuvardhan; Dwarakish; Bhavani; Jayalakshmi
- Cinematography: Chittibabu
- Edited by: Bal G. Yadav
- Music by: Rajan–Nagendra
- Production company: Shastri Associates
- Release date: 1975
- Running time: 144 minutes
- Country: India
- Language: Kannada

Kalla Kulla is a 1975 Indian Kannada-language comedy drama film, directed by K. S. R. Das and produced by Shastry Associates. The story is written by M. D. Sundar. The film stars Vishnuvardhan, Dwarakish, Bhavani and Jayalakshmi. The film was widely appreciated for its songs and story upon release. The songs composed by Rajan–Nagendra were huge hits. The movie was dubbed in Hindi as Chor Ka Bhai Chor. H.R. Bhargava was the associate director of this movie. The director remade the movie in Telugu in 1976 as Kallanum Kullanum. The movie was dubbed in Malayalam as Kallanum Kullanum

== Cast ==
- Vishnuvardhan as Mahesh "Kalla"
- Dwarakish as CID Ramesh "Kulla", Mahesh's brother
- Bhavani as Roopa
- Jayalakshmi
- Vijaya Lalitha as Leela, Kalla and Kulla's sister
- Leelavathi as Padma: Kalla, Kulla and Leela's mother
- Vajramuni as Sukumar
- Thoogudeepa Srinivas as Sarvottama
- Tiger Prabhakar
- Rajanand as Kaushik
- Fighter Shetty as Tony
- Chethan Ramarao as Padma's husband
- Hanumanthachar

== Soundtrack ==
Kalla Kulla

Soundtrack album by Rajan–Nagendra
- Released: 1974
- Genre: Feature film soundtrack
- Label: Saregama

The music of the film was composed by Rajan–Nagendra and the lyrics were written by Chi. Udaya Shankar and R. N. Jayagopal. The song "Suthha Muthha" was received extremely well.

Track listing
| No. | Title | Singer(s) | Length |
|---|---|---|---|
| 1. | "Naa Haadalu" | S. P. Balasubrahmanyam |
| 2. | "Suthha Muthha Yaaru Illa" | P. B. Sreenivas, Vani Jairam |
| 3. | "Madana Prema Sadana" | P. B. Sreenivas, S. Janaki |
| 4. | "Amma Endare" | P. B. Sreenivas, H. Krishnamurthy |
| 5. | "Saaka Ishte Saaka" | P. Susheela, S. Janaki |
