= Bhale Huduga =

1978 film

- Directed by: T. R. Ramanna
- Written by: Kunigal Nagabhushan (dialogues)
- Screenplay by: T. R. Ramanna
- Story by: Sakthi T. K. Krishnasamy
- Based on: Panakkara Kudumbam (Tamil)(1964)
- Produced by: R. Ganesh
- Starring: Vishnuvardhan; Manjula; Dwarakish; Udaykumar
- Cinematography: J. G. Vijayan
- Edited by: T. R. Srinivasalu
- Music by: G. K. Venkatesh
- Production company: Royal Pictures
- Distributed by: Royal Pictures
- Release date: 15 November 1978
- Running time: 137 minutes
- Country: India
- Language: Kannada

Bhale Huduga is a 1978 Indian Kannada-language film directed by T. R. Ramanna who also wrote the screenplay. It was produced by R. Ganesh. The film stars Vishnuvardhan, Manjula, Dwarakish and Udaykumar, with music composed by G. K. Venkatesh. It is a remake of the 1964 Tamil film Panakkara Kudumbam.

== Cast ==
- Vishnuvardhan as Ravi
- Manjula as Geetha
- Dwarakish in triple role Shreerama, Balarama, Parashurama
- Raji as Ambuja
- Udaykumar as Gopala Rao, Geetha's father
- Jayakumari as Rajalakshmi, Gopala Rao's first wife
- Chindodi Leela as Bhama, Gopala Rao's second wife
- Chethan Ramarao as Ravi's father
- Thoogudeepa Srinivas as Subraya Bhama's younger brother
- Jayamalini
- Vanichandra as Lilly
- Shashikala
- Sudhashree
- Dikki Madhavarao as Datthanna who protects Rajalakshmi
- Kunigal Nagabhushan as marriage purohith
- Vasanthkumar
- Master Ravishankar
- Kunigal Ramamurthy as hostel warden
- Pranayamurthy
