= List of Kannada songs recorded by K. J. Yesudas =

K. J. Yesudas discography
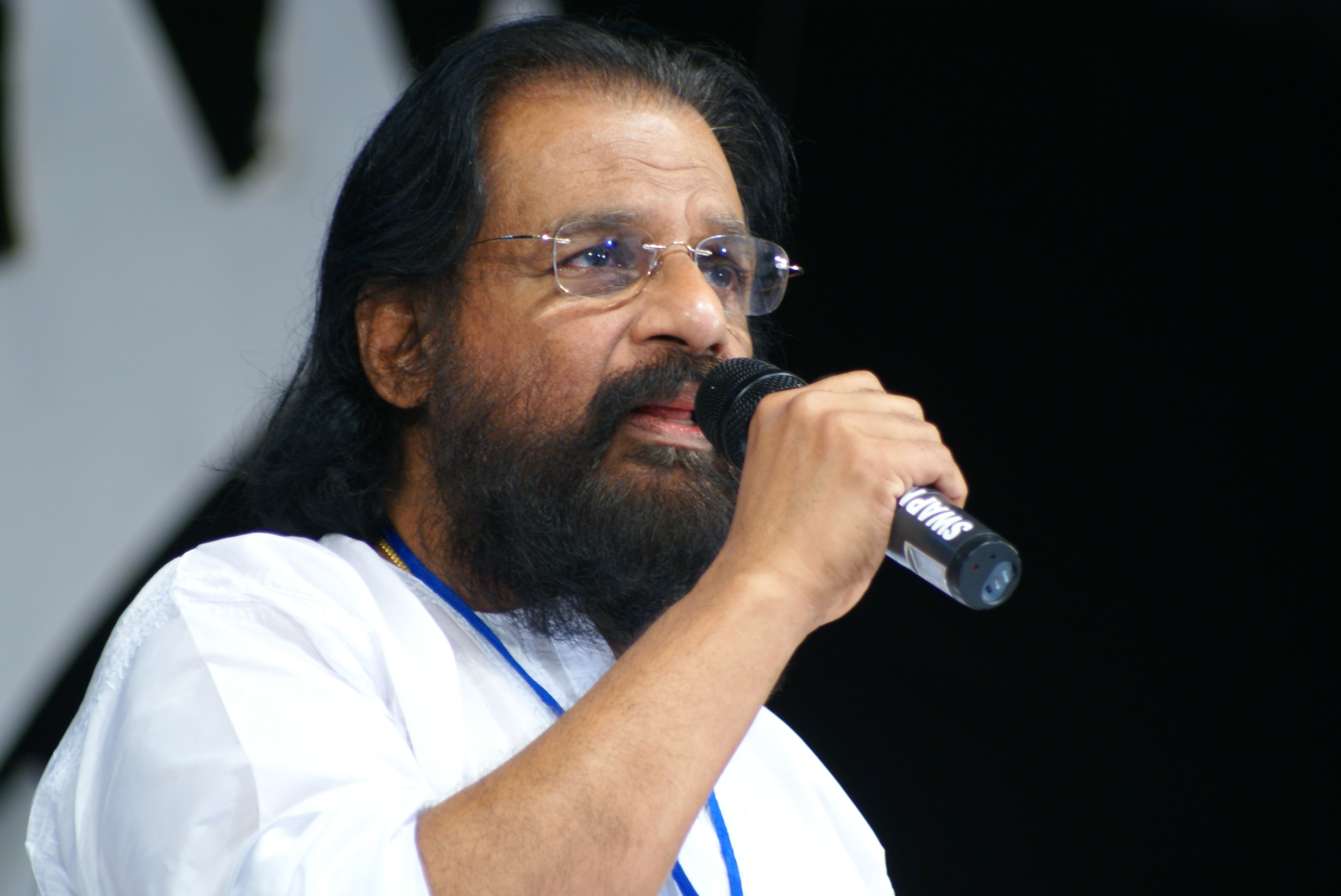
- Yesudas during a live concert in 2010

K. J. Yesudas has sung 211 Kannada songs till date. Most of his songs were with singer S. Janaki and composer Hamsalekha.

== Film songs ==
Year	Film	No	Song	Composer(s)	Co-artist(s)
1964	Chandavalliya Thota	1	"Ondaguvaa Mundaguvaa"	T. G. Lingappa	L. R. Eswari
1966	Premamayi	2	"Henne Ninna Kannanota"	R. Sudarsanam	S. Janaki
1966	Premamayi	3	"Thoo Thoo Thoo Bedappa"	R. Sudarsanam	solo
1967	Muddu Meena	4	"Iduve Vidhi Leele"	Upendra Kumar	solo
1967	Onde Balliya Hoogalu	5	"Daari Kaanada"	Satyam	S. Janaki
1968	Manku Dinne	6	"Idea Vidhi Leele"	Vijaya Bhaskar	solo
1971	Baala Bandhana	7	"Aapad Baandava"	G. K. Venkatesh	solo
1972	Triveni	8	"Mane Mandhikalla"	Upendra Kumar	solo
1973	Kesarina Kamala	9	"Sada Aananda Nandana"	Vijayabhaskar	S. Janaki
1973	Mooroovare Vajragalu	10	"Sathiyu Bandalu"	R. Sudarshanam	solo
1974	Maga Mommaga	11	"Ee Mosa Ee Droha"	M. Ranga Rao	solo
1975	Devara Kannu	12	"Naguvina Aluvina"		solo
1975	Anna Attige	13	"Olavemba"	G. K. Venkatesh	Vani Jairam
1975	Nireekshe	14	"Baalina Guriya Seruva"	G. K. Venkatesh	solo
1976	Baalu Jenu	15	"Madhura Balu Madhura"	G. K. Venkatesh	S. Janaki
1976	Punarmilana	16	"Ninnanga Cheluvu"	M. Ranga Rao	solo
1977	Chinna Ninna Muddaduve	17	"Jojo Laali"	Salil Chowdhury	solo
1977	Geddavalu Naane	18	"Geddavalu	M. Ranga Rao	P. Susheela
1977	Hemavathi	19	"Maanavaro Neevu"	L. Vaidyanathan	solo
1977	Kittu Puttu	20	"Kaalavannu Thadeyoru"	Rajan Nagendra	S Janaki
1977	Kittu Puttu	21	"Nille Gowramma"	Rajan Nagendra	solo
1978	Aparichita	22	"Ee Nada Anda"	Rajan Nagendra	solo
1978	Chithegu Chinthe	23	"Kadala Seemeyinda"	B G Ramanath	solo
1978	Daaha	24	"Daaha Daaha"	Ramlal Sehra	solo
1978	Kiladi Kittu	25	"Hoovanthe Hennu"	Mohan Kumar	solo
1978	Kiladi Jodi	26	"Kiladi Jodi"	Rajan Nagendra	S. P. Balasubrahmanyam
1978	Kudure Mukha	27	"Nee Bandhe"	T G Lingappa	S Janaki
1978	Muyyige Muyyi	28	"Ee Sundara Chandiraninda"	Satyam	S Janaki
1978	Singaporenalli Raja Kulla	29	"Prema Preethi Nannusiru"	Rajan Nagendra	S. P. Balasubrahmanyam
1978	Singaporenalli Raja Kulla	30	"Nannantha Gandilla"	Rajan Nagendra	S P Balasubrahmanyam, P Susheela, S Janaki
1978	Swarna Bhoomi	31	"Kaanada Deavaru"	Vijayabhaskar	P. B. Sreenivas
1978	Vasantha Lakshmi	32	"Nadeyale Naduvu"	Vijayabhaskar	SP Balasubramaniam, S Janaki, Vani Jairam
	Priya	33	"Kavitha Neenu"	Ilaiyaraaja	S Janaki
	Priya	34	"Nannali Neena"	Ilaiyaraaja	S Janaki
	Priya	35	"Saagara Daacheya"	Ilaiyaraaja	solo
	Priya	36	"Thangaliye"	Ilaiyaraaja	solo
1980	Akhanda Bramhacharialu	37	"Rama Nama"	Vijayabhaskar	solo
1980	Bhakta Siriyala	38	"Athithi Seveye"	TG Lingappa	S Janaki
1980	Bhakta Siriyala	39	"Preethi Premagale"	TG Lingappa	S Janaki
1980	Manjina There	40	"Balasiruve"	Upendra Kumar	Vani Jairam
1980	Manjina There	41	"O Nanna Cheluve"	Upendra Kumar	solo
1980	Narada Vijaya	42	"Ee Vesha Nodabeda"	C. Ashwath	S Janaki
1980	Narada Vijaya	43	"Entha Lokavayya"	C. Ashwath	solo
1980	Muniyana Madari	44	"Indigundha"	Rajan Nagendra	P. Jayachandran
1981	Naaga kala Bhairava	45	"Nammee Balee"	M Ranga Rao	Bangalore Latha
1981	Naaga kala Bhairava	46	"Olavina"	M Ranga Rao	P Susheela
1981	Naaga kala Bhairava	47	"Naguvude Swarga"	M Ranga Rao	solo
1981	Punya Koti	48	"Sneha Adimadhura"	Mysore Ananthaswamy	solo
1981	Raaga Thaala	49	"Hey Shilpi"	M Ranga Rao	solo
1982	Hasyaratna Ramakrishna	50	"Iddu Hogu Iddu Hogu"	TG Lingappa	S Janaki
1982	Hasyaratna Ramakrishna	51	"Chikkavanene Ivanu"	TG Lingappa	Vani Jairam
1982	Muttinantha Atthige	52	"Mohana Roopa"	Ramesh Naidu	Poorna Chandar, Krishnamoorthy, S. P. Sailaja
1982	Muttinantha Atthige	53	"Namarede Kogile"	Ramesh Naidu	SP Sailaja
1982	Shankar Sunder	54	"Belakali Neenu"	GK Venkitesh	S Janaki
1982	Shankar Sunder	55	"Baa Baa Ider Aavo"	GK Venkitesh	Vani Jairam
1984	Bandhana	56	"Ee Bandhana"	M Ranga Rao	S Janaki
1984	Benki Birugali	57	"Helalaarenu"	M Ranga Rao	Vani Jairam
1984	Guru Jagadguru	58	"Bayake Thumbida"	GK Venkatesh	S Janaki
1984	Guru Jagadguru	59	"Mere Pyare Guru"	GK Venkatesh	S Janaki
1984	Guru Jagadguru	60	"Kachaguli Ittu"	GK Venkatesh	solo
1984	Kilaadi Aliya	61	"Kannalli Indu"	Sathyam	solo
1984	Kilaadi Aliya	62	"Gaalige Silukida"	Sathyam	solo
1984	Madhuve Madu Tamashe Nodu	63	"Madhuve Hennige"	Vijayanand	solo
1985	Ajeya	64	"Sihimutha Needi"	Ilaiyaraja	S Janaki
1985	Ajeya	65	"Hero Hero"	Ilaiyaraja	solo
1985	Baalondu Uyyaale	66	"Neeno Naano"	M. S. Vishwanathan	Ramesh Chandra
1985	Chakra Bandha	67	"Bandha Anubandha"	Thayanban	solo
1985	Hendthi Beku Hendthi	68	"Belura Shilaya"	M Ranga Rao	solo
1985	Hosa Balu	69	"Baalinalli Intha"	GK Venkatesh	Vani Jairam
1985	Manasa Veene	70	"Veene Nanna Maanasa Veene"	M Ranga Rao	Vani Jairam
1985	Mamatheya Madilu	71	"Prema Sangama"	M. S. Vishwanathan	Vani Jairam
1985	Mamatheya Madilu	72	"Chinna Nanna Ninna"	M. S. Vishwanathan	solo
1985	Naanu Nanna Hendthi	73	"Yaare Neenu Cheluve"	Shankar Ganesh	solo
1985	Pithamaha	74	"Mareyadiru Aa Shakthiya"	M Ranga Rao	solo
1985	Pithamaha	75	"Angaliruva"	M Ranga Rao	S P Balasubrahmanyam
1985	Sathi Sakkubai	76	"Jaya Panduranga"	Rajan Nagendra	solo
1986	Africadalli Sheela	77	"Sheela O My Sheela"	Bappi Lahiri	K. S. Chithra
1986	Africadalli Sheela	78	"Thampada Tholu"	Bappi Lahiri	Manjula Gururaj
1986	Antarangada Mrudanga	79	"Baanagalada"	M Ranga Rao	Vani Jairam
1986	Aruna Raaga	80	"Naanondu Theera"	M Ranga Rao	K S Chithra
1986	Asambhava	81	"Jeeva Bandha"	Hamsalekha	Vani Jairam
1986	Asambhava	82	"Ninnantha Kathegaara"	Hamsalekha	solo
1986	Ee Jeeva Ninagagi	83	"Amma Amma Ennu Maathu"	Vijayanand	solo
1986	Guruve Daiva	84	"Guruve Daiva Manaye"	M S Vishwanathan	solo
1986	Karna	85	"Aa Karnananthe"	M Ranga Rao	solo
1986	Maanasa Veene	86	"Na Naguthiruve"	M Ranga Rao	solo
1986	Malaya Marutha	87	"Malaya Marutha Gaana"	Vijayabhaskar	S Janaki
1986	Malaya Marutha	88	"Hindanagali Hidivadeda	Vijayabhaskar	Vani Jairam
1986	Malaya Marutha	89	"Ellellu Sangeethave"	Vijayabhaskar	solo
1986	Malaya Marutha	90	"Ellaru Maaduvadu"	Vijayabhaskar	solo
1986	Malaya Marutha	91	Madhurambham"	Vijayabhaskar	solo
1986	Malaya Marutha	92	"Natana Visharada"	Vijayabhaskar	solo
1986	Malaya Marutha	93	"Sakalakarya Kaaranage"	Vijayabhaskar	solo
1986	Malaya Marutha	94	"Sangeetha Jnanamu"	Vijayabhaskar	solo
1986	Malaya Marutha	95	"Sharade Dayathoride"	Vijayabhaskar	solo
1986	Malaya Marutha	96	"Srinivasa Enna Bittu"	Vijayabhaskar	solo
1986	Malaya Marutha	97	"Yam Shaivassampusathe"	Vijayabhaskar	solo
1986	Maneye Manthralaya	98	"Maneye Manthralaya"	M Ranga Rao	Ramesh, S Janaki, Manjula Gururaj
1986	Maneye Manthralaya	99	"Happy Birthday"	M Ranga Rao	S Janaki
1986	Maneye Manthralaya	100	"Endendu Baalali"	M Ranga Rao	Ramesh, S Janaki, Manjula Gururaj
1986	Maneye Manthralaya	101	Maneye Baridayithu"	M Ranga Rao	S Janaki
1986	Mouna Geethe	102	"Ee Hoovu"	M Ranga Rao	S Janaki
1986	Mouna Geethe	103	"Thavare Kannavale"	M Ranga Rao	S Janaki
1986	Snehada Kadalalli	104	"Kannige Mosa"	M Ranga Rao	S Janaki
1986	Snehada Kadalalli	105	"Sada Harusha Snehada"	M Ranga Rao	S P Balasubrahmanyam
1986	Sathkara	106	"Cheluveya Moga"	Sathyam	KS Chithra
1986	Sathkara	107	"Kanasinda Nee"	Sathyam	S Janaki
1986	Sundara Swapnagalu	108	"Hege Helali Ada Hege"	Vijayabhaskar	Vani Jairam
1986	Usha	109	Ninnantha Sreemathi	Rajan Nagendra	S Janaki
1987	Inspector Kranthikumar	110	"Naa Sakida"	Rajan Nagendra	S Janaki
1987	Namma Bhagya	111	"Baanali Soorya"	Balaji Ram	Vani Jairam
1987	Premaloka	112	"Premalokadinda"	Hamsalekha	S Janaki
1989	Jai Karnataka	113	"Naguve Hoovanthe"	Vijayanand	solo
1989	Punda Prachanda	114	"Beladingalu"	Hamsalekha	KS Chithra
1989	Punda Prachanda	115	"Gudugu"	Hamsalekha	Mano
1990	Aavesha	116	"Dwani Dwani"	Hamsalekha	S Janaki
1990	Mathe Abhimanyu	117	"Hele Hele Bharathe"	Hamsalekha	solo
1990	Anantha Prema	118	"Premavu Beda Preyasi"	Hamsalekha	solo
1990	Anantha Prema	119	"Andhuge Kaalalli"	Hamsalekha	solo
1990	Anantha Prema	120	"Neenenamma	Hamsalekha	solo
1990	Hosa Jeevana	121	"Anaadha Maguvade"	Hamsalekha	Chandrika Gururaj
1990	Kempu Gulabi	122	"Kempu Gulaabi"	Hamsalekha	Swarnalatha
1990	Kempu Gulabi	123	"Naanu Ninninda"	Hamsalekha	Swarnalatha
1990	Kempu Gulabi	124	"Hoovina Loka Nammathu"	Hamsalekha	solo
1990	Panchama Veda	125	"Aase Holeye"	Sangeetha Raja	solo
1990	Ramarajyadalli Rakshasaru	126	"Ee Yavvana"	M Ranga Rao	solo
1990	Ramarajyadalli Rakshasaru	127	"Kambani Yemba"		solo
1990	Sabarimale Sree Ayyappa	128	"Swami Ayyappa"	K. V. Mahadevan	solo
1990	S. P. Sangliyana Part 2	129	"Meru Giriyane"	Hamsalekha	Rathnamala Prakash
1990	Swarna Samsara	130	"Kunkuma"	Upendra Kumar	Manjula Gururaj, B. R. Chaya
1990	Swarna Samsara	131	"Nagunagutha"	Upendra Kumar	Manjula Gururaj, BR Chaya
1990	Swarna Samsara	132	"Manasu Kallagide"	Upendra Kumar	solo
1990	Nigooda Rahasya	133	"Oh Thiliya Neer"	Hamsalekha	Manjula Gururaj
1990	Nigooda Rahasya	134	"Laali Jo, Jo Laali Jo"	Hamsalekha	S Janaki
1991	Baare Nanna Muddina Raani	135	"Nee Mayya Muttidaaga"	Rajan Nagendra	Kasthuri Shankar
1991	Baare Nanna Muddina Raani	136	"Hennindale Ella"	Rajan Nagendra	Manjula Gururaj
1991	Ramachari	137	"Nammoora Yuvarani"	Hamsalekha	solo
1991	Ramachari	138	"Ramachari Haaduva"	Hamsalekha	solo
1991	Ramachari	139	"Ramachari Kannina (sad)"	Hamsalekha	solo
1992	Bhale Keshava	140	"Nooru Kadala Datti"	Shivaranjani Devaraj	solo
1992	Entede Bhanta	141	"Yaakindu Neenu"	Hamsalekha	solo
1992	Gopi Krishna	142	"Oho Vasantha"	Hamsalekha	S Janaki
1992	Guru Brahma	143	"Deepa Deepa"	Hamsalekha	K S Chithra
1992	Guru Brahma	144	"Hettu Hottu Muttu Kottu"	Hamsalekha	Manjula Gururaj, Mano
1992	Guru Brahma	145	"Maduve Maduve Jodi"	Hamsalekha	KS Chithra, Mano
1992	Halli Meshtru	146	"Ilkal Seere Utkond"	Hamsalekha	solo
1992	Mallige Hoove	147	"Baare Cheluve"	Hamsalekha	KS Chithra
1992	Mallige Hoove	148	"Preethi Mador Madhya"	Hamsalekha	solo
1992	Mallige Hoove	149	"Andavo Andavo"	Hamsalekha	KS Chithra
1992	Madhura Preethi	150	"Gowriya Roopa Neenamma"	Nadeem-Shravan	solo
1992	Shruthi	151	"Janma Janumadallu"	S. A. Rajkumar	Manjula Gururaj
1992	Shruthi	152	"Haadondu Naa"	S. A. Rajkumar	solo
1992	Mana Gedda Maga	153	"Ninna Preethi	L Vaidyanathan	Vani Jairam
1992	Pranayada Pakshigalu	154	"Naguva Shaili Entha Lovely"	Manoranjan Prabhakar	solo
1992	Pranayada Pakshigalu	155	"Jum Jum Maiyalli"	Manoranjan Prabhakar	Manjula Gururaj
1992	Pranayada Pakshigalu	156	"Baanaadi Ninagaagi Kaade"	Manoranjan Prabhakar	solo
1993	Jailor Jagannath	157	"Yaaro Yaaro"	Hamsalekha	solo
1993	Manikantana Mahime	158	"Harivarasanam"	M. S. Viswanathan	
1993	Rayaru Bandaru Mavana Manege	159	"Nagumomu"	Raj Koti	Poorna Chandar
1993	Thooguve Krishnana	160	"Ruthumaaleyalli"	Manoranjan Prabhakar	KS Chithra
1993	Thooguve Krishnana	161	"O Chandamama Eke"	Manoranjan Prabhakar	solo
1993	Tring Tring	162	"Sakath Maja"	S Balakrishnan	solo
1993	Sri Durga Pooja	163	"Navarathri Nota"	Vijaya Narasimha	solo
1993	Sri Durga Pooja	164	"Sri Matha"	Kunnakkudi Vaidyanathan	solo
1994	Gandharva	165	"Anuraagadalli Gandharvagana	Hamsalekha	solo
1995	Ganayogi Panchakshara Gawai	166	"Paaramartha Thathwa"	Hamsalekha	solo
1995	Dore	167	"Ago Bandhanu"	Hamsalekha	K S Chithra
1995	Pruthviraj	168	"Ade Saagara"	Sax Raja	K S Chithra
1995	Pruthviraj	169	"Chandada Nandana Vana"	Sax Raja	KS Chithra, Baby Artist
1995	Pruthviraj	170	"Banni Kanna"	Sax Raja	KS Chithra, Kasturi Shankar, Baby Artist
1996	Sipayi	171	"Bangarada Bombe"	Hamsalekha	KS Chithra
1996	Sipayi	172	"Yarige Beku Ee Loka"	Hamsalekha	solo
1998	Avala Charithre	173	"Hannondu Maagidare"	Vijayabhaskar	solo
1998	Maneyalli Ramanna Beedeeli Kamanna	174	"Mangala Vadhya"	Satyam	solo
1999	AK 47	175	"Naanu Kannadada Kanda"	Hamsalekha	solo
1999	Bharatha Naari	176	"Neeve Namma Heeve Namma"	Hamsalekha	solo
1999	Maha Edabidangi	177	"Sri Chamundeshwari Devi"	Vijaya Bhaskar	solo
1999	O Premave	178	"O Premave"	V. Ravichandran	solo
1999	Sneha	179	"Ellide Baalina Janapatha"	V. Ravichandran	solo
1999	Sneha	180	"Yakamma Beku"	V. Ravichandran	solo
2000	Bhaktha Ayyappa	181	"Harivarasanam"	Gandharva	solo
2000	Chora Chitta Chora	182	"Ho Igo Ellondu"	V Ravichandran	KS Chithra
2000	Preethsod Thappa	183	"Bangaradinda"	Hamsalekha	Anuradha Sriram
2000	Preethsod Thappa	184	"Sone Sone"	Hamsalekha	Anuradha Sriram
2001	Huchcha	185	"Maathu Thappithalu"	Rajesh Ramanath	solo
2001	Huchcha	186	"Yaaro Yaaro"	Rajesh Ramanath	solo
2001	Usire	187	"Preethisuve"	Ilaiyaraja	Bhavatharini
2001	Usire	188	"Chandri Nee Chanda"	Ilaiyaraja	solo
2002	Balagalittu Olage Baa	189	"Haadendare Maguvamma"	Hamsalekha	solo
2002	Balagalittu Olage Baa	190	"Shloka"	Hamsalekha	solo
2002	Cheluve Ondu Heltini	191	"Rani Rani Swapnarani"	Hamsalekha	Nanditha
2002	Dakota Express	192	"Bogase Kangala"	Hamsalekha	solo
2002	Dakota Express	193	"Gulabi Hoove"	Hamsalekha	solo
2002	Naanu Naane	194	"Sangaathi"	Deva	Anuradha Sriram
2003	Nanjundi	195	"Thaayi Endalli"	Hamsalekha	solo
2003	Sogasugaara	196	"Chandiranillada"	Rajesh Ramanath	solo
2003	Sogasugaara	197	"Malagiruva"	Rajesh Ramanath	solo
2004	Saradara	198	"Kaanada Brahmame"	Venkat Narayan	solo
2004	Saradara	199	"Kaanada Kaiyali"	Venkat Narayan	solo
2005	Kashi from Village	200	"Maguve Nagutiru"	Koti	solo
2006	Poojari	201	"Janma Kota Thayi"	Abhimann Roy	solo
2007	Premigaagi Naa	202	"Aase Kanasolu"	Rajesh Ramnath	solo
2009	Koo Koo	203	"Ammana Vaathsalya"	Sagar Nagabhushan	solo
2009	Koo Koo	204	"Chigura"	Sagar Nagabhushan	solo
2009	Preethi Nee Shashwathana	205	"Attamele Kanneerige"	K. Kalyan	solo
2009	Sihigaali	206	"Kathegaara Yaravanu"	GR Shankar	solo
2011	Hare Rama Hare Krishna	207	"Baalu Idhu Baalu"	Ilaiyaraja	solo
2011	Narasimha	208	"Bandhe Naanu Bhoomige"	Hamsalekha	solo
2012	Krantiveera Sangolli Rayanna	209	"Chinnadantha Aramane"	Yashovardhan	solo
2014	Bossu Ade Hale Kathe	210	"Hudugiyaru"	CR Bobby	solo
N/A	N/A	211	"Helu Neenlentha Santhosha"	N/A	solo
