= List of Kannada films of 1985 =

== Top-grossing films ==
Rank	Title	Collection	Ref.
1.	Nee Bareda Kadambari	₹3 crore (₹48.49 crore in 2025)	
2.	Dhruva Thare	₹2 crore (₹32.32 crore in 2025)	
3.	Bettada Hoovu	₹1 crore (₹16.16 crore in 2025)	

== List ==
The following is a list of films produced in the Kannada film industry in India in 1985, presented in alphabetical order.

Title	Director	Cast	Music	Reference
Aahuti	T. S. Nagabharana	Ambareesh, Sumalatha, Dheerendra Gopal, Sundar Krishna Urs	M. Ranga Rao	
Ade Kannu	Chi. Dattaraj	Rajkumar, Gayathri, Thoogudeepa Srinivas	G. K. Venkatesh	
Ajeya	Siddalingaiah	Murali, Sandhya, Leelavathi, Vijay Kashi	Ilaiyaraaja	
Amara Jyothi	B. Subba Rao	Ambareesh, Jai Jagadish, Madhavi, Samyuktha	Satyam	
Balondu Uyyale	Amrutham	Srinath, Shanthi, Soumya, Dwarakish, Srinivasa Murthy, Pallavi	M. S. Viswanathan	
Bengalooru Rathriyalli	Mohamed Fakruddin	Srinath, Roopa Devi, Shivaram, Lokanath	Prabhakar Badri	
Bettada Hoovu	N. Lakshminarayan	Padma Vasanthi, Puneeth Rajkumar, Roopa Devi, Balakrishna	Rajan–Nagendra	
Bhayankara Bhasmasura	C. S. Rao	Udayakumar, Ashok, Manjula	M. Ranga Rao	
Bidugadeya Bedi	Dorai-Bhagavan	Ananth Nag, Lakshmi, K. S. Ashwath	Rajan–Nagendra	
Brahma Gantu	B. Subba Rao	Sridhar, Saritha, Sadhana, Dwarakish, Lokanath	Vijay Anand	
Chaduranga	V. Somashekhar	Ambareesh, Ambika, Vajramuni, Mukhyamantri Chandru	G. K. Venkatesh	
Devara Mane	A. T. Raghu	Ambareesh, Jai Jagadish, Rajesh, Pallavi	K. J. Joy	
Devarelliddane	V. Somashekhar	Ambareesh, Kalyan Kumar, Geetha, Pallavi	S. P. Balasubrahmanyam	
Dharma	Vijay Gujjar	Jai Jagadish, Vijayalakshmi Singh, Jayanthi	Satyam	
Dhruva Thare	M. S. Rajashekar	Rajkumar, Geetha, Deepa, Balakrishna	Upendra Kumar	
Giri Baale	B. Mallesh	Ambareesh, Geetha, Shobhana, K S Ashwath, Lokanath, Thoogudeepa Srinivas	Rajan–Nagendra	
Goonda Guru	A. T. Raghu	Ambareesh, Geetha, Vajramuni, Sundar Krishna Urs	M. Ranga Rao	
Guru Jagadguru	A. T. Raghu	Ambareesh, Deepa, Mukhyamantri Chandru, K. S. Ashwath	G. K. Venkatesh	
Haavu Yeni Aata	V. K. K. Prasad	Ananth Nag, Aarathi, Suresh Heblikar	Vijaya Bhaskar	
Jeevana Chakra	H. R. Bhargava	Vishnuvardhan, Radhika, Ramesh Bhat	Rajan–Nagendra	
Jwaalamukhi	Singeetham Srinivasa Rao	Rajkumar, Gayathri, K. S. Ashwath, Thoogudeepa Srinivas	M. Ranga Rao	
Kadina Raja	A. T. Raghu	Tiger Prabhakar, Deepa, Anuradha, Ramakrishna Hegde	Rajan–Nagendra	
Kartavya	K. S. R. Das	Vishnuvardhan, Pavitra, R. N. Sudarshan, Lokanath	Satyam	
Khiladi Aliya	Vijay	Shankar Nag, Gayathri, Kalyan Kumar, Udaya Chandrika	Satyam	
Kumkuma Tanda Sowbhagya	A. V. Sheshgiri Rao	Srinath, Aarathi, Vajramuni, Charan Raj	M. Ranga Rao	
Kuridoddi Kurukshetra	Vijay Gujjar	Aarathi, Sundar Krishna Urs, Sundar Raj, Lokanath	Satyam	
Lakshmi Kataksha	B. Subba Rao	Aarathi, Kalyan Kumar, Rajeev, Pramila Joshai, Srinivasa Murthy	Satyam	
Maha Purusha	Joe Simon	Vishnuvardhan, Gayatrhi, Jai Jagadish, Roopa Devi	Satyam	
Mamatheya Madilu	Eeranki Sharma	Ambareesh, Geetha, Sandhya, Srinivasa Murthy	M. S. Viswanathan	
Mareyada Manikya	Vijay	Vishnuvardhan, Geetha, K. R. Vijaya, Dheerendra Gopal	Shankar–Ganesh	
Maruthi Mahime	Perala	Charan Raj, Bhavya, Vajramuni, Dinesh	Satyam	
Mugila Mallige	K. Balachander	Ashok, Srinath, Saritha	V. S. Narasimhan	
Nanna Prathigne	K. S. R. Das	Vishnuvardhan, Ahalya, Vajramuni	Satyam	
Naanu Nanna Hendthi	Rajendra Babu	V. Ravichandran, Urvashi, Leelavathi, Mukhyamantri Chandru	Shankar–Ganesh	
Nee Bareda Kadambari	Dwarakish	Vishnuvardhan, Bhavya, C. R. Simha	Vijay Anand	
Nee Nakkaga	C. S. Manju	Aarathi, Sundar Krishna Urs, Dinesh, Dingri Nagaraj	Upendra Kumar	
Nee Thanda Kanike	Dwarakish	Vishnuvardhan, Jayasudha, Girish Karnad	Vijay Anand	
Nyayada Kannu	Sridhar Raj	Ashok, Vanithasri, Pandari Bai	Anto-Balu	
Parameshi Prema Prasanga	Ramesh Bhat	Shankar Nag, Ananth Nag, Ramesh Bhat, Arundhati Nag	G. K. Venkatesh	
Pithamaha	K. S. L. Swamy	Udaykumar, Rajesh, V. Ravichandran, Vijayalakshmi Singh, Jai Jagadish	M. Ranga Rao	
Pralaya Rudra	P S Prakash	Tiger Prabhakar, Jayamala, Charan Raj, Pramila Joshai	Satyam	
Savira Sullu	B. Subba Rao	V. Ravichandran, Radha, Lokesh	Shankar–Ganesh	
Sati Sakkubai	N. S. Dhananjay	Aarathi, Srinath, Uma Shivakumar	Shankar–Ganesh	
Sedina Hakki	Dorai-Bhagavan	Ananth Nag, Lakshmi, Tiger Prabhakar	Rajan–Nagendra	
Shabhash Vikram	Renuka Sharma	Ambareesh, Urvashi, Sathyaraj	G. K. Venkatesh	
Shiva Kotta Sowbhagya	Hunsur Krishnamurthy	Lokesh, Aarathi, Jayanthi	T. G. Lingappa	
Swabhimana	D. Rajendra Babu	V. Ravichandran, Mahalakshmi, Tiger Prabhakar, Aarathi	Shankar–Ganesh	
Thayi Kanasu	Vijay	Shankar Nag, Charan Raj, Sumalatha, Deepa, Doddanna	Satyam	
Thayi Mamathe	B. Subba Rao	Tiger Prabhakar, Sumalatha, Urvashi	Satyam	
Thayi Thande	V. Satya Narayana	Kalyan Kumar, B. Saroja Devi, Indira	T. Chalapathi Rao	
Thayiya Hone	Vijay	Ashok, Charan Raj, Sumalatha, Jayanthi	Satyam	
Thrishula	Narasimhan; P. Nanjundappa	Sundar Raj, Roopa Devi, Devaraj, Avinash	Kalyan - Venkatesh	
Thulasidala	Vemagal Jagannath Rao	Sharat Babu, Aarathi, Tara, Baby Rekha, Sundar Krishna Urs	Upendra Kumar	
Vajra Mushti	H. R. Bhargava	Shankar Nag, Gayathri, M. P. Shankar, Aarathi	Satyam	
Veeradhi Veera	Vijay	Vishnuvardhan, Geetha, Vajramuni, Musuri Krishnamurthy	M. Ranga Rao	

== See also ==
- Kannada films of 1984
- Kannada films of 1986
