= List of Kannada films of 1986 =

== Top-grossing films ==
Rank	Title	Collection	Ref.
1.	Anuraga Aralithu	₹5 crore (₹76.12 crore in 2025)	
2.	Anand	₹3 crore (₹45.67 crore in 2025)	
3.	Ee Jeeva Ninagagi	₹2 crore (₹30.44 crore in 2025)	

== List ==
The following is a list of films produced in the Kannada film industry in India in 1986, presented in alphabetical order.

Title	Director	Cast	Music	Reference
27 Mavalli Circle	T. N. Narasimhan	T. N. Narasimhan, Devaraj, Kalpana Reddy, Umashri	L. Vaidyanathan	
Africadalli Sheela	Dwarakish	Charan Raj, Sahila Chadha, Kalyan Kumar, Dwarakish, Disco Shanti	Bappi Lahiri	
Anand	Singeetham Srinivasa Rao	Shivarajkumar, Sudharani, Chi Guru Dutt, Tara	Shankar–Ganesh	
Anuraga Aralithu	M. S. Rajashekar	Rajkumar, Geetha, Madhavi, Pandari Bai	Upendra Kumar	
Aruna Raaga	K. V. Jayaram	Ananth Nag, Geetha, K. S. Ashwath, Lokanath, Pandari Bai	M. Ranga Rao	
Asambhava	D. Rajendra Babu	V. Ravichandran, Ambika, Mukhyamantri Chandru, Sumithra	Shankar–Ganesh	
Beegara Pandhya	K. Babu Rao	Sridhar, Poornima, Mukhyamantri Chandru, C. R. Simha, Anuradha	Ramesh Naidu	
Belli Naaga	N. S. Dhananjaya	Tiger Prabhakar, Nalini, Deepa, Balakrishna	Satyam	
Bete	V. Somashekhar	Ambareesh, Ambika, Anuradha, Umashree, Tara	S. P. Balasubrahmanyam	
Bettada Thayi	Perala	Srinath, Aarathi, Vajramuni	Satyam	
Bhagyada Lakshmi Baramma	Singeetham Srinivasa Rao	Rajkumar, Madhavi, K. S. Ashwath, Balakrishna, Thoogudeepa Srinivas	Singeetham Srinivasa Rao	
Brahmastra	Perala	Ambareesh, Lakshmi, Tara, Vajramuni, Mukhyamantri Chandru	Satyam	
Ee Jeeva Ninagagi	V. Somashekhar	Vishnuvardhan, Urvashi, Baby Shalini, Lokanath	Vijay Anand	
Ella Hengasarinda	B. Subba Rao	Rajesh, Jai Jagadish, Ramakrishna, Bharathi Vishnuvardhan, Tara, Padma Vasanthi, Bhavya	Krishna Chakra	
Guri	P. Vasu	Rajkumar, Archana, Tara, Pandari Bai, Jai Jagadish	Rajan–Nagendra	
Henne Ninagenu Bandhana	Ravindranath	Charan Raj, Thulasi, Mukhyamantri Chandru, Pandari Bai	Hamsalekha	
Hennina Koogu	Dorai-Bhagavan	Sridhar, Saritha, Tara, K. S. Ashwath	M. Ranga Rao	
Hosa Neeru	K. V. Jayaram	Ananth Nag, Suhasini, Lokanath	G. K. Venkatesh	
Karna	H. R. Bhargava	Vishnuvardhan, Sumalatha, K. S. Ashwath, Sumithra	M. Ranga Rao	
Kathanayaka	P. Vasu	Vishnuvardhan, Sumalatha, Leelavathi, Vajramuni, Srinivasa Murthy	M. Ranga Rao	
Kedi No.1	Kommineni Seshagiri Rao	Tiger Prabhakar, Viji, Dheerendra Gopal, Leelavathi	Satyam	
Krishna Nee Begane Baro	H. R. Bhargava	Vishnuvardhan, Bhavya, Kim, Mukhyamantri Chandru	Bappi Lahiri	
Lancha Lancha Lancha	Ravindranath	Lokesh, Jayanthi, Mahalakshmi, Jai Jagadish, Sundar Raj	Kalyan – Venkatesh	
Madhura Bandhavya	Amrutham	Ambareesh, Geetha, Jai Jagadish, Tara	M. Ranga Rao	
Madhavacharya	G. V. Iyer	Poorna Prasad, Ravindra, Shrivatsa, Vinaya Prasad	M. Balamuralikrishna	
Madhuve Madu Tamashe Nodu	Sathya	Vishnuvardhan, Aarathi, Dwarakish, Jai Jagadish, Mahalakshmi,	Vijay Anand	
Malaya Marutha	Lalitha Ravi	Vishnuvardhan, Madhavi, Saritha, Shivaram, Dinesh	Vijaya Bhaskar	
Maneye Manthralaya	H. R. Bhargava	Ananth Nag, Bharathi, Ramesh Aravind, Jai Jagadish, Tara, Umashree	M. Ranga Rao	
Marjala	B Vijay Gujjar	Vijay Kashi, Pallavi, Padma Vasanthi, Lohithaswa	K. J. Joy	
Matthondu Charitre	B. Mallesh	Ambareesh, Madhavi, Tara, Thoogudeepa Srinivas	Rajan-Nagendra	
Mouna Geethe	Geethapriya	Srinath, Saritha, Sridhar, Sai Kumar	M. Ranga Rao	
Mrugaalaya	V. Somashekhar	Ambareesh, Geetha, Sudheer	Rajan–Nagendra	
Na Ninna Preetisuve	Somu – Shankar	Arjun Sarja, V. Ravichandran, Bhavya, M. P. Shankar	Shankar–Ganesh	
Namma Oora Devathe	Renuka Sharma	Charan Raj, Bharathi, Vinod Kumar Alva, Bhavya	Satyam	
Nannavaru	Bhagawan Sarang	Srinath, Lakshmi, Dinesh, Ramakrishna	M. Ranga Rao	
Nenapina Doni	T. S. Nagabharana	Ananth Nag, Girish Karnad, Geetha, Roopadevi	Vijaya Bhaskar	
Preethi	A. T. Raghu	Ambareesh, Bhavya, Gayatri	G. K. Venkatesh	
Prema Gange	Gururaju	Murali, Bhavya, Vijay Kashi, Doddanna	Rajan–Nagendra	
Prema Jala	Joe Simon	Ananth Nag, Mahalakshmi, Seetharam, Shivaram	M. Ranga Rao	
Rasthe Raja	Leela Vara Prasad	Shankar Nag, Gayatri, Jayanthi	Satyam	
Ratha Sapthami	M. S. Rajashekar	Shivarajkumar, Asha Rani, Parvatha Vani, Doddanna	Upendra Kumar	
Samsarada Guttu	Raghava	Shankar Nag, Mahalakshmi, Tara, Sundar Raj	Satyam	
Sathkara	Renuka Sharma	Ambareesh, Ambika, Tara, Vajramuni, Thoogudeepa Srinivas	Satyam	
Satya Jyothi	K. Rangaraj	Vishnuvardhan, Urvashi, Balakrishna	Ilaiyaraaja	
Sedina Sanchu	T. S. Nagabharana	Rajesh, Bhavya, Ramakrishna Hegde, Mukhyamantri Chandru	Satyam	
Shankha Nada	Umesh Kulkarni	Ramesh Bhat, Abhinaya, Arvind, Honnayya	C. Ashwath	
Sundara Swapnagalu	K. Balachander	Sridhar, Ramesh Aravind, Devilalitha, Tara, Janani, Kuyili	Vijaya Bhaskar	
Thayiye Nanna Devaru	Vijay	Shankar Nag, Tiger Prabhakar, Jayanthi, Pallavi, Mukhyamantri Chandru	Satyam	
Thavaru Mane	Vijay	Kalyan Kumar, Bharathi Vishnuvardhan, Bhavya, Tara, Vinod Alva	Vijaya Bhaskar	
Tiger	Raviraja	Tiger Prabhakar, Aarathi, Ramakrishna, Mahalakshmi	Shankar–Ganesh	
Usha	Raghava	Kalyan Kumar, Suhasini, Jayanthi	Rajan–Nagendra	
Vishwaroopa	V. Somashekhar	Ambareesh, Geetha, Vajramuni	Rajan–Nagendra	

== See also ==
- Kannada films of 1985
- Kannada films of 1987
