= Rajakumari (TV series) =

Television series

- Genre: Soap opera
- Created by: Ramya Krishnan
- Written by: S. Ashok Kumar
- Screenplay by: Raj Prabhu
- Story by: Raj Prabhu
- Directed by: Rakesh Sinha (1-37); B. Nakkeeran (38-54); K.Sulaiman (55-95)
- Creative director: Ramya Krishnan
- Starring: Ramya Krishnan; Sarath Babu; Geetha; Nalini; Menaka
- Original language: Tamil
- No. of seasons: 1
- No. of episodes: 95

Production
- Producer: Vaidehi Ramamurthy
- Cinematography: M.V.Kalyan
- Editor: S.Arul
- Camera setup: Multi-camera
- Running time: approx. 20-22 minutes per episode
- Production company: Vision Time

Original release
- Network: Sun TV
- Release: 28 January – 7 June 2013

Rajakumari (transl. Princess) is a 2013 Indian Tamil-language soap opera that aired on Sun TV from 28 January 2013 to 7 June 2013 for 94 episodes. The show premiered on Monday January 2013. It aired Monday through Friday at 8:30pm IST and stars Ramya Krishnan, Sarath Babu, Geetha, Nalini and Menaka.

The show Directed by Raja, writer by S. Ashok Kumar and screenplay by R. Vijay. The show last aired on 7 June 2013 and ended with 94 episodes. It was also aired in Sri Lanka Tamil Channel on Vasantham TV.

== Plot ==
Nilampari (Ramya Krishnan) wants to lead a simple and peaceful life. But people around her have different motives. This causes many problems to her, and she faces them with her positive energy and support from a few faithful friends and relatives.

== Cast ==
- Ramya Krishnan as Nilambari
- Sarath Babu as Sivalingam
- Raja Krishnamoorthy as Mahalingam
- Oorvambu Lakshmi as Selvi
- Geetha as Lakshmi Mahalingam
- Nalini as Malliga
- Menaka as Durga Sivalingam
- Afser babu as Shankar
- Latha Rao as Manju
- Sidharath as Sanjay
- Ramesh as
- Kutty Pooja as Sujatha
- Bhuvana (Bhavana) as Prithi
- Sathish as Sathish
- Karthi as Pradeep
- Venkat as Kathirava
- Kaviya as Nandhini
- Ashritha Kingini as Deepa
- Nathan Shyam as Mahesh
- Vetrivel as Ramesh
- T.T.V.Ramanujam as Sami gurukal
- Subhalekha Sudhakar as Rajagopal
- Lenin Anpan

== See also ==
- List of programs broadcast by Sun TV
