= Mareyada Manikya =

- Directed by: Vijay
- Written by: Sharada
- Screenplay by: K. P. Kottarakara
- Produced by: Sharada
- Starring: Vishnuvardhan; K. R. Vijaya; Geetha; Dheerendra Gopal
- Cinematography: V. Manohar
- Edited by: Venkataraman
- Music by: Shankar–Ganesh
- Production company: Jayadevi Movies
- Release date: 30 March 1985
- Country: India
- Language: Kannada

Mareyada Manikya is a 1985 Indian Kannada film, directed by Vijay and produced by Sharada. The film stars Vishnuvardhan, K. R. Vijaya, Geetha and Dheerendra Gopal in the lead roles. The film has musical score by Shankar–Ganesh.

== Cast ==
- Vishnuvardhan as Santhosh
- K. R. Vijaya as Santhosh's mother
- Geetha as Gowri
- Dheerendra Gopal
- Sundar Krishna Urs
- Sathish
- N. S. Rao
- Ravichandra
- Rajanand
- Chethan Ramarao
- Vedaprada
- Shanthamma
- Padmaja
- Baby Rekha
- Negro Johnny
- Shani Mahadevappa
- Suryakumar
- Somanna
- Jorge
- Hari
