= Nanna Prathigne =

- Directed by: K. S. R. Das
- Written by: Chi. Udaya Shankar
- Screenplay by: K. S. R. Das
- Story by: K. S. R. Das
- Produced by: Padmanabham
- Starring: Vishnuvardhan; Ahalya; Vajramuni; Kanchana
- Cinematography: Kabir Lal
- Edited by: P. Venkateshwara Rao
- Music by: Satyam
- Production company: Makkala Thilakam Pictures
- Distributed by: Makkala Thilakam Pictures
- Release date: 8 August 1985
- Running time: 128 min
- Country: India
- Language: Kannada

Nanna Prathigne (Kannada: ನನ್ನ ಪ್ರತಿಜ್ಞೆ) is a 1985 Indian Kannada film, directed by K. S. R. Das and produced by Padmanabham. The film stars Vishnuvardhan, Ahalya, Vajramuni and Kanchana in the lead roles. The film has musical score by Satyam.

== Cast ==
- Vishnuvardhan as Shankar
- Ahalya as Vardhini
- Vajramuni as Vishakantaiah
- Kanchana as Mangala
- M. Jayashree as Seethamma
- Shani Mahadevappa as Somanna
- B. Hanumanthachar
- Sulochana
- Kuchalashree
- Malleshwari
