= Ghar Dwaar =

Ghar Dwar
- Poster
- Directed by: Kalpatru
- Starring: Tanuja; Sachin Pilgaonkar; Shoma Anand; Dr. Shriram Lagoo
- Music by: Chitragupta
- Release date: 1985

Ghar Dwaar is a 1985 Hindi family drama film starring Tanuja and Sachin Pilgaonkar in the lead roles. The film was remade in Telugu as Aadi Dampatulu, in Kannada as Maneye Manthralaya and in Tamil as Kudumbam Oru Kovil.

== Plot ==
Dhanraj resides with his two brothers, Chander and Ketan, sister Asha, and wife Savitri in their family home. Dhanraj wants Chander and Ketan to study and have a good career so he works multiple jobs and slogs away to sustain the family and pay for their education. But this is not enough and a choice must be made to allow only one brother to carry on studying. Ketan feigns illness and lets Chander to become an engineer. Chander then marries Chanda, the only of a multi-millionaire widow. Things do not go as planned in the joint family and Chanda swears to destroy the love that binds this family. She works on each family member individually with the hopes of separating them and dividing their love, so that she can live alone with Chander.

== Cast ==
- Tanuja as Savitri.
- Sachin Pilgaonkar as Ketan.
- Kader Khan as Lalaji.
- Raj Kiran as Chander.
- Shoma Anand as Chanda.
- Dr. Shriram Lagoo as Dhanraj.
- Ashok Saraf as Bahadur.
- Shraddha Verma as Asha (Munni).
- Jayshree T. as Sheela (Bahadur's Wife)
- Ashalata Wabgaonkar as Ashalata, Chanda's Mother.
- Shivraj as Ketan's boss.

== Soundtrack ==
The music of this movie was composed by Chitragupta. The film featured a popular song named "Mera Babu Chhail Chhabila".

- "Titliyon Se Kahe Do" (Ghar Dwaar / Soundtrack Version) Kishore Kumar
- "Baaja Baja" (Ghar Dwaar / Soundtrack Version) Shabbir Kumar, Alka Yagnik
- "Koi Jaye Kashi" (Ghar Dwaar / Soundtrack Version) Alka Yagnik, Chandrani Mukherjee, Poornima, Suresh Wadkar
- "Meri Behna" (Ghar Dwaar / Soundtrack Version) Mohammad Aziz, Suresh Wadkar, Manhar
- "Boloon Baat Pateki" (Ghar Dwaar / Soundtrack Version) Amit Kumar
- "Saat Pheron Ke" (Ghar Dwaar / Soundtrack Version) Asha Bhosle
- "Hum Na Jaibe" (Ghar Dwaar / Soundtrack Version) Alka Yagnik
- "Swarg Se Sunder" (Slow) (Ghar Dwaar / Soundtrack Version) Chandrani Mukherjee
- "Mera Babu Chhail Chhabila" Runa Laila
