= Devatha Manushya =

1988 Kannada film by Singeetham Srinivasarao

- Directed by: Singeetham Srinivasa Rao
- Screenplay by: Singeetham Srinivasa Rao; Chi. Udaya Shankar
- Story by: Singeetham Srinivasa Rao
- Produced by: Parvatamma Rajkumar
- Starring: Rajkumar; Geetha; Sudharani
- Cinematography: V. K. Kannan
- Edited by: P. G. Mohan
- Music by: Upendra Kumar
- Production company: Poornima Enterprises
- Release date: 1988
- Running time: 137 minutes
- Country: India
- Language: Kannada

Devatha Manushya ( transl. Divine Person) is a 1988 Indian Kannada-language film written and directed by Singeetham Srinivasa Rao. The film stars Rajkumar, Geetha, K. S. Ashwath and Sudharani. The movie is famous for its evergreen songs, which were composed by Upendra Kumar.

This was Rajkumar's 200th movie - which initially should have been the historical Amoghavarsha Nrupathunga with the same director but subsequently dropped. The core plot of the movie is based on the 1861 English novel Silas Marner by George Eliot.

== Plot ==
Krishna Murthy is a hard working driver who believes in living a simple life. His boss, a business tycoon, maintains a low profile about his business and does not reveal it to anybody. A high-profile robbery for a golden idol of Goddess has taken place and Krishna Murthy is blamed for it. Whether he will be able to break away from this blame and bring forward the criminal forms the rest of the story.

== Cast ==
- Dr. Rajkumar as Krishna Murthy
- Geetha as Jaya
- Sudharani as Seetha, Murthy's daughter
- K. S. Ashwath as Vaikuntha, Jaya's Father
- T. N. Balakrishna as Rangappa
- Kanchana as Sarasu, Murthy's elder sister and Jaya's Mother
- Rajanand as Kapanipathi
- Sundar Krishna Urs as Manjunathayya
- Shivaram as Tippayya
- Hema Choudhary as Yamuna, Manjunathayya's wife
- Padma Kumta as Kaveri, Kapanipathi's wife

== Soundtrack ==
Devatha Manushya

Soundtrack album by Upendra Kumar
- Released: 1988
- Genre: Feature film soundtrack
- Length: 16:47
- Label: Lahari Music
- Director: Upendra Kumar

Upendra Kumar composed the background score for the film and the soundtracks. Lyrics for the soundtracks were written by Chi. Udaya Shankar. The album consists of five soundtracks.

Tracklist
| No. | Title | Singer(s) | Length |
|---|---|---|---|
| 1. | "Hrudayadali Idenidhu" | Dr. Rajkumar, Manjula Gururaj | 4:56 |
| 2. | "Ninantha Appa Illa" | Dr. Rajkumar, B. R. Chaya | 4:50 |
| 3. | "Haalalladaru (Bit)" | B. R. Chaya | 0:52 |
| 4. | "Ee Sogasaada Sanje" | Dr. Rajkumar, Vani Jairam | 4:02 |
| 5. | "Ide Jeevana" | S. P. Balasubrahmanyam | 2:07 |
| Total length: | | | 16:47 |

== Awards ==
- Karnataka State Film Awards 1988-89: Best Actor - Dr. Rajkumar
