= Kranthiyogi Basavanna =

- Directed by: K. S. L. Swamy (Ravee)
- Written by: Jagadguru Maate Mahadevi
- Screenplay by: Jagadguru Maate Mahadevi
- Starring: Ashok; Aarathi; Srinivasa Murthy; Manjula; Hema Chowdhary
- Cinematography: Purushottham
- Edited by: Yadav Victor
- Music by: M. Ranga Rao
- Production company: Vishwa Kalyana Movies
- Distributed by: Vishwa Kalyana Movies
- Release date: 3 August 1983
- Country: India
- Language: Kannada

Kranthiyogi Basavanna is a 1983 Indian Kannada-language film, directed by K. S. L. Swamy (Ravee). The film stars Ashok, Aarathi, Srinivasa Murthy, Manjula, Hema Chowdhary. The film has musical score by M. Ranga Rao. This movie is about life of one of the greatest social reformer of India Vishwa Guru Basavanna. He is the founder of Lingayat community. Basavanna was first on earth to come up with idea of a parliament. In 12th century, Basavanna formed the first parliament in the world called "Anubhava Mantapa" (Kannada: ಅನುಭವ ಮಂಟಪ).

== Cast ==
- Ashok as Kayaka Yogi Basavanna
- Aarathi as Gangambike, Basavanna's First Wife
- Manjula as Neelambike, Basavanna's Second Wife
- Srinivasa Murthy as King Bijjalla
- Hema Choudhary as Bijjalla's Wife
- Vajramuni as Manchanna
- Prabhakar in Guest Appearance
- Bharathi in Guest Appearance as Akka Mahadevi
- Rajesh in Guest Appearance as Allama Prabhu
- Manju Bhargavi in Guest Appearance
- Musuri Krishnamurthy in Guest Appearance as Guru of Gurukula
- Sudheer
- Shashikala
- Vasudeva Rao as Haralayya
- Doddanna as Maduvarasa
- Baby Rekha as Child Basava
- Chandrashekar as Channa Basavanna
- Shivaram

== Soundtrack ==
The music was composed by M. Ranga Rao.

No.	Song	Singers	Lyrics	Length (m:ss)
1	"Shiva Shiva Mahadeva"	S. P. Balasubrahmanyam, S. Janaki	Maate Mahadevi	04:50
2	"Januma Janumantarada"	S. P. Balasubrahmanyam, S. Janaki	Maate Mahadevi	04:28
3	"Ella Ballidanaiah"	S. P. Balasubrahmanyam	Maate Mahadevi	04:15
4	"Odhagite Namagintha Bhagya"	P. B. Sreenivas, Vani Jairam	Maate Mahadevi	04:37
5	"Neera Kandalli"	S. P. Balasubrahmanyam	Shri Basaveshwara	01:02
6	"Kalalli Kattida Gundu"	S. P. Balasubrahmanyam	Shri Basaveshwara	01:27
7	"Jagadagala Mugilagala"	S. P. Balasubrahmanyam	Shri Basaveshwara	01:21
8	"Vachanadalli Namamruta"	S. P. Balasubrahmanyam	Shri Basaveshwara	01:24
9	"Ullavaru Shivalayava"	S. P. Balasubrahmanyam	Shri Basaveshwara	01:53
10	"Ba Yemballi Yenna"	Vani Jairam	Shri Allama Prabhu	01:18
11	"Suryanudaya Tavarege"	Vani Jairam	Shri Basaveshwara	01:21
12	"Kalabeda Kolabeda"	S. P. Balasubrahmanyam	Shri Basaveshwara	01:43
13	"Bhakthi Yemba Pruthvi"	S. P. Balasubrahmanyam	Shri Basaveshwara	01:37
