= Thenkalam =

Thenkalam Tenkulam, Thengalam
- Village
- Location in Tamil Nadu, India
- Coordinates: 8°49′05″N 77°41′57″E
- Country: India
- State: Tamil Nadu
- District: Tirunelveli

Government
  - Type: Gram Panchayat
  - Body: Thalaiyuthu Panchayat, Thenkalam Panchayat
- Elevation: 79 m (259 ft)

Population (2011)
  - Total: 5,000 approx
- Demonym(s): Thenkalamite, Thenkalathaar, Thenkalathukaarar, Thenkalathukaaramma

Languages
  - Native: Tamil
  - Official: Tamil
  - Additional Official: English
- Time zone: UTC+5:30 (IST)
- Pincode(s): 627357
- Vehicle registration: TN-72

Thenkalam, officially called Tenkulam, is a village in the Tirunelveli district of Tamil Nadu, India. It lies about 13 kilometres (8.1 mi) from the city of Tirunelveli and about 5 kilometres (3.1 mi) from Sankarnagar, a suburb of Tirunelveli which lies on the way to Madurai on National Highway 44.

== Etymology ==
Even though the village is now widely known as Thenkalam, official records show that it was once called Tenkulam. Tenkulam must be the anglicized form of Thenkulam. Assuming this, Thenkulam can be broken into two words: Then & Kulam. 'Then' in Tamil refers to 'South' while 'Kulam' may refer to two things: Pond(குளம்) or a group of related people(குலம்). So, Thenkulam can be translated into English as 'Pond in the south' or 'People of the south'. There is a large pond to the southeast of the village, Thalaiyuthu Kulam.

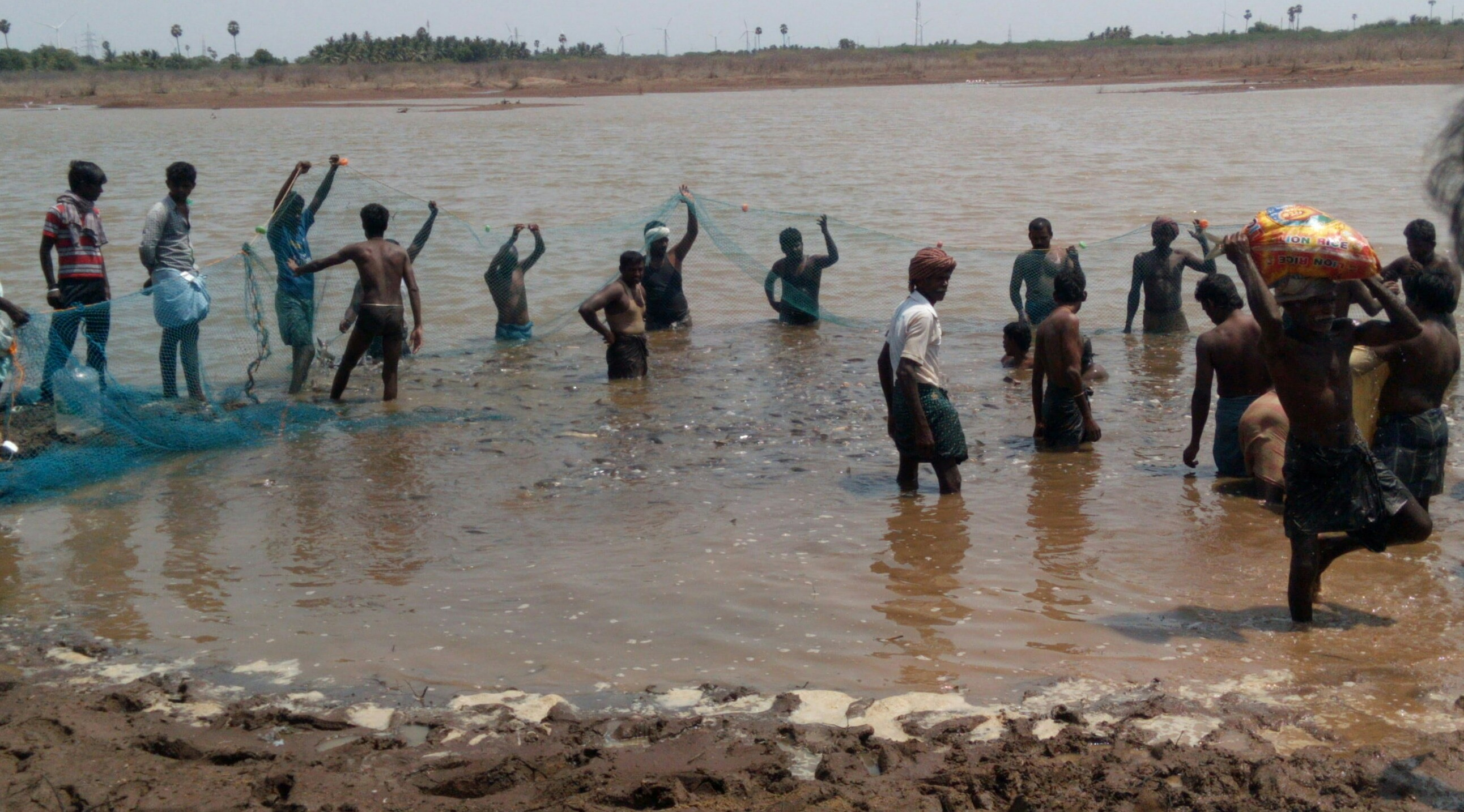
Men fishing in the village pond, Thalaiyuthu Kulam

== Geography ==
Thenkalam is located in a hillocky region being surrounded by two large hillocks: one to the east and the other one to the south. The eastern hillock is called Keezhamalai which is a mere translation (Keezha-East; Malai-Hillock). The southern hillock is similarly called Therkkumalai. The neighborhood of Therkkumalai Colony is located here. The village pond, Thalaiyuthu Kulam, is built by connecting the two hillocks with an embankment. It is a rain fed farm pond which acts as a direct source of irrigation for lands in the Keelapathu and also indirectly helps agriculture by increasing the water table which rises water levels in surrounding wells.

== Neighborhoods ==
From Sankarnagar towards the last habitation of the village, the neighborhoods are in the following order:

- Therkkumalai Colony
- Kamaraj Nagar
- Keezha Thenkalam
- Mela Thenkalam
- Periyar Nagar
- Nallamalpuram
- Gandhi Nagar
- Thenkalam Pudur
- Puliyankottaram

== Utilities ==
Thenkalam houses a Post Office, a Bank, a Veterinary centre, and hence is an important centre of business in the area. There is also a common service centre (E-Sevai Maiyam) at Keezha Thenkalam near Keezha Amman Kovil where one can avail various e-services. Electricity is supplied by Tamil Nadu Electricity Board(TNEB). Thalaiyuthu Sub-Station of TNEB is the local body responsible for power supply in the village.

== Transport ==
Thenkalam is well connected with Tirunelveli Old Bus Stand by bus, average journey time being 40 minutes. Buses with boards of:

1. Thenkalam pudur (தென்கலம்புதூர்)
2. Alavanthankulam (அலவந்தான்குளம்)
3. Therkku Chezhiyanallur (தெற்கு செழியநல்லூர்)
4. Nanjankulam (நாஞ்சான்குளம்)
5. Rastha/Nallamalpuram (ரஸ்தா/நல்லம்மாள்புரம்) - Only Route no.40
6. Madhavakurichi/Manur (மதவக்குறிச்சி/மானூர்) - Only Route no.33C
7. Pallamadai (பள்ளமடை) - Only Route no.3J

- go to the village. A 33A private Therkku Chezhiyanallur bus shunts up to Thenkalam twice a day.

The nearest railway station is Talaiyuthu where only passenger trains stop. Tirunelveli Junction is the nearest major railhead with daily trains to Chennai, Bengaluru, Madurai, Salem, Tiruchirappalli, Thiruvananthapuram, Kochi, Coimbatore; weekly trains to Hyderabad, Kolkata and a bi-weekly to Delhi(Thirukural Express).

The nearest airport, Tuticorin Airport, is connected with chennai by two daily flights. The nearest international airport is at Madurai.

== Schools ==
1. Panchayat Union Elementary Schools (ஊராட்சி ஒன்றிய தொடக்கப் பள்ளிகள்) - Keezha Thenkalam, Nallammalpuram and Thenkalam Pudur
2. Government ADW Higher Secondary School, Nallammalpuram - Separate campuses for Boys and Girls
3. T.D.T.A School
4. St.Paul's Nursery and Primary School
5. Star School

The last two of the five are Private Schools.

== Notable people ==
1. Daniel Selvaraj, Sahitya Akademi Award winning Tamil writer.
2. S. Ashok Kumar who has served as a judge in various courts of law, was born in Thenkalam Pudur - a hamlet under the administration of Thenkalam Panchayat.
