= Premashilpi =

1978 Malayalam film

- Directed by: V. T. Thyagarajan
- Written by: Sreekumaran Thampi
- Starring: Jayabharathi; Jagathy Sreekumar; Sankaradi; Hema Choudhary; Sreelatha Namboothiri
- Music by: V. Dakshinamoorthy
- Production company: Usha Cine Arts
- Distributed by: Usha Cine Arts
- Release date: 11 August 1978
- Country: India
- Language: Malayalam

Premashilpi is a 1978 Indian Malayalam-language film. The film stars Jayabharathi, Jagathy Sreekumar, Hema Choudhary, Sankaradi and Sreelatha Namboothiri. The musical score is by V. Dakshinamoorthy. It is a remake of the 1968 Tamil film Teacheramma.

== Cast ==
- Jayabharathi as Bharathi
- Jagathy Sreekumar as Picasso Thankamani
- Hema Choudhary as Hema
- Aranmula Ponnamma as Prakash's mother
- Sreelatha Namboothiri as Reetha
- K. P. Ummer as Prakash
- M. G. Soman as Soman
- Meena as Reetha's mother
- Mallika Sukumaran as Bindu's mother
- Vanchiyoor Radha as Headmistress
- Baby Priya as Bindu
- Venu
- Girija

== Soundtrack ==
The music was composed by V. Dakshinamoorthy with lyrics by Sreekumaran Thampi.

No.	Song	Singers	Lyrics	Length (m:ss)
1	"Amme Amme"	Vani Jairam	Sreekumaran Thampi	
2	"Kathirmandapathil"	Vani Jairam	Sreekumaran Thampi	
3	"Thulliyaadum Vaarmudiyil"	K. J. Yesudas	Sreekumaran Thampi	
4	"Vannu Njan Ee Varna"	P. Jayachandran	Sreekumaran Thampi	
