= Goonda Guru =

- Directed by: A. T. Raghu
- Written by: Shobha
- Screenplay by: H. V. Subba Rao
- Produced by: S. Ramnath; Chandulal Jain
- Starring: Ambareesh; Geetha; Vajramuni; Hema Chaudhary; Sundar Krishna Urs
- Cinematography: V. K. Kannan
- Edited by: Yadav Victor
- Music by: M. Ranga Rao
- Production company: Ramraj Kalamandir
- Release date: 12 December 1984
- Country: India
- Language: Kannada

Goonda Guru is a 1985 Indian Kannada film, directed by A. T. Raghu and produced by S. Ramnath and Chandulal Jain. The film stars Ambareesh, Geetha, Vajramuni, Hema Choudhary and Sundar Krishna Urs in the lead roles. The film has musical score by M. Ranga Rao.

== Cast ==
- Ambareesh
- Geetha
- Vajramuni
- Hema Choudhary
- Sundar Krishna Urs
- Srilalitha
- Shashikala
- N.S. Rao
- Mysore Lokesh
- Shankar Rao
- Gode Lakshminarayan
- Hanumanthachar
- Comedian Guggu
- Chethan Ramarao
- Kalale Dore
- Ashwath Narayan
- Manjumalini
- Rathnamala
- Bhavani
- Kalpana
- Renuka
- Sharadamma
- Thulasibai
- Mangalamma
- Saraswathibai
- Jayamma
- Kasthuri
- Indira
- Master Manjunath
- Shivaram in Guest Appearance
