= Belli Naaga =

1986 film directed by N. S. Dhananjaya

- Directed by: N. S. Dhananjaya (Datthu)
- Written by: A. R. Raju
- Screenplay by: H. V. Subba Rao
- Produced by: A. R. Raju
- Starring: Tiger Prabhakar; Nalini; Dinesh; Sudarshan
- Cinematography: V. Lakshman
- Edited by: P. Venkateshwara Rao
- Music by: Satyam
- Production company: Ajantha Combines
- Release date: 30 August 1986
- Country: India
- Language: Kannada

Belli Naaga is a 1986 Indian Kannada film, directed by N. S. Dhananjaya (Datthu) and produced by A. R. Raju. The film stars Tiger Prabhakar, Nalini, Dinesh and Sudarshan in the lead roles. The film has musical score by Satyam.

== Cast ==
- Tiger Prabhakar
- Nalini
- Dinesh
- Sudarshan
- Rajanand
- Master Rohith
- Master Vasanth
- Master Rajesh
- Aruru Sathyabhama
- K. N. Bharathi
- Shanthamma
- Archana
- Lalithamma
- Mysore Lokesh
- Shankar Rao
- Gangadhar Swamy
- Srinivasa Murthy
- Thyagaraj Urs
- B. K. Shankar
- Jaggu
- Surendra
- Aravind
- Dayanand Sagar
- Prakash
- Stanly
- Sampath Kumar
- Baby Geetha
- Shakti Prasad in Guest Appearance
- Kunigal Nagabhushan in Guest Appearance
