= Hema Chaudhary =

Indian actress

- Born: Durga Prabha; Chennai, Tamil Nadu
- Occupations: Actress and classical dancer
- Years active: 1975–present
- Children: 1
- Mother: Brindavanam Chowdari

Durga Prabha, known by her stage name, Hema Chaudhary is an Indian actress who has predominantly acted in Kannada, Telugu, Malayalam and Tamil films. Starting her career as a lead actress in the Telugu film Pelli Kani Pelli in 1976, she switched over to supporting roles in the 1980s.

She is best remembered for her negative roles in Kannada films like Vijaya Vani, Shubhashaya, Deepa, Gaali Maathu and Nee Bareda Kadambari. Among her Tamil films, the K. Balachander directed Manmatha Leelai (1976) opposite Kamal Haasan is the most notable. Having acted in over 180 films, Hema is considered one of the most popular character artistes in South Indian cinema.

Apart from acting, Hema Choudhary is an accomplished Kuchipudi dancer and has performed for over 700 shows all across the world with her guru Vempati Chinna Satyam. She wasa classmate of Rajanikanth in the acting school at Madras. She is a recipient of the Panorama Award for her dancing skills. She has also been chosen by the National Film Awards committee as the judging panel for three years.

== Early life ==
Hema was born to the popular female dubbing artiste and Telugu film Actress Brundavana Chowdari, in Chennai, Tamil Nadu. She graduated from the Chennai Film Institute with Rajini Kanth and others.

== Career ==
After completing her acting course, Hema started her career in the 1976 Telugu film Pelli Kani Pelli directed by Adhiraj Anand Mohan, opposite actor Sreedhar. and was one of the heroines opposite Kamal Haasan in the blockbuster Tamil film Manmatha Leelai (1976).

Her maiden Kannada film was Vijaya Vani (1976) in which she played the second lead followed by Shubhashaya, Devara Duddu, Vamsha Jyothi and Deepa. She also worked in Telugu films such as Bangaru Manishi (1977), Nijam (1978), Kotta Alludu (1979). Her bold portrayal of a character with grey shades in Gaali Maathu (1981) made her a household name. From then on, she went on to appear in more than 150 films as a supporting actress with all the big directors and actors in Kannada cinema.

Hema follows the practice of offering a silk saree at Hindu Goddess temples across the country after the completion of each of her films.

== Filmography ==
=== Kannada ===
- Vijaya Vani (1976)
- Shubhashaya (1977)
- Deepa (1977)
- Devara Duddu (1977)
- Sridevi (1978)
- Anubandha (1978)
- Vamsha Jyothi (1978)
- Varadakshine (1980)
- Narada Vijaya (1980)
- Nanna Rosha Nooru Varusha (1980)
- Manku Thimma (1980)
- Sri Raghavendra Vaibhava (1980)
- Guru Shishyaru (1981)
- Gaali Maathu (1981)
- Avali Javali (1981)
- Prema Mathsara (1982)
- Kannu Theresida Hennu (1982)
- Jimmy Gallu (1982)
- Garuda Rekhe (1982)
- Thirugu Baana (1983)
- Kranthiyogi Basavanna (1983)
- Yarivanu (1984)
- Aaradhane (1984)
- Nee Bareda Kadambari (1985)
- Masanada Hoovu (1985)
- Kuridoddi Kurukshethra (1985)
- Haavu Yeni Aata (1985)
- Goonda Guru (1985)
- Bhayanakara Bhasmasura (1985)
- Sampradaya (1987)
- Thayiya Aase (1988)
- Krishna Rukmini (1988)
- Devatha Manushya (1988)
- Samsara Nouke (1989)...Susheela
- Nyayakaagi Naanu (1989)
- Krishna Nee Kunidaga (1989)
- Kindari Jogi (1989)
- Santha Shishunala Sharifa (1990)
- Maheshwara (film) (1990)
- Kiladi Thatha (1990)
- Kempu Gulabi (1990)
- Ajay Vijay (1990)
- Bangaradantha Maga (1991)
- Thavarumane Udugore (1991)
- Readymade Ganda (1991)
- Mangalya (1991)
- Ganesha Subramanya (1992)
- Putta Hendthi (1992)
- Midida Shruthi (1992)
- Prema Sangama (1992)
- Halli Krishna Delhi Radha (1992)
- Anuraga Geethe (1994)
- Sididedda Shiva (1994)
- Kurubana Rani (1997)
- Taayi Kotta Sire (1997)
- Kubera (1999)
- Veerappa Nayaka (1999)
- Surya Vamsha (1999)
- Sankata Bangada Venkata Ramana (2000)
- Durgada Huli (2000)
- Deepavali (2000)
- Namma Samsara Ananda Sagara (2001)
- Kanasugara (2001)
- Jamindaru (2002)
- Thavarige Baa Thangi (2002)
- Super Police (2002)
- Yarado Duddu Yallamana Jatre (2003)
- Kasu Iddone Basu (2003)
- Sri Ram (2003)
- Samudra (2004)
- Anna Thangi (2005)
- Ayya (2005)
- Valmiki (2005)
- Savira Mettilu (2006)
- Thavarina Siri (2006)
- Lava Kusha (2007)
- Santha (2007)
- Gandana Mane (2007)
- Budhivanta (2008)
- Bandhu Balaga (2008)
- Devaru Kotta Thangi (2009)
- Male Barali Manju Irali (2009)
- Vismaya Pranaya (2010)
- Sogasugara (2011)
- Mallikarjuna (2011)
- Shakthi (2012)
- Bhagirathi (2012)
- God Fother (2012)
- Dasavala (2013)
- Super Ranga (2014)
- Ganga (2015)
- Dasharatha (2019)

=== Telugu ===
1. Ee Kalam Dampathulu (1975)
2. Pelli Kani Pelli (1976)
3. Manmatha Leela (1976)
4. Bangaru Manishi (1978)
5. Premayanam (1978)
6. Jaruguthunna Katha (1978)
7. Nijam (1979)
8. Kotta Alludu (1979)
9. Sri Raghavendra Vaibhavam (1981)
10. Premalayam (1986)
11. Tandra Paparayudu (1986)
12. Disco Samrat (1987)
13. Ramudu Kadhu Rakshasudu (1991)
14. Sundarakanda (1992)
15. Prema Vijetha (1992)
16. Puttintiki Raa Chelli (2004)
17. Gorintaku (2008)
18. Mesthri (2009)

=== Malayalam ===
1. Thulavarsham (1976)
2. Premashilpi (1977)
3. Sundarimaarude Swapnangal (1978)
4. Tharoo Oru Janmam Koodi (1978)
5. Kochu Kochu Thettukal (1980)
6. Garuda Rekha (1982)
7. Pattanatil Naradan (1984)

=== Tamil ===
1. Manmatha Leelai (1976) as Madhavai
2. Kungumam Kathai Solgirathu (1978)
3. Paartha Gnabagam Illayo (1985)
4. Star (2001)
5. Naan Avanillai (2007)
6. Thotta (2008)

== Television ==
1. Amruthavarshini (2012–2017)
2. Nayaki (2019–2020)

== Awards ==
- Karnataka Rajyotsava Award

Government of Karnataka

- International film festival of Kerala award given by kerala state chalanachitra academy
- Innovative Film Award for Best Actor in a Negative Role (Female)
- Santhosham Lifetime achievement award - For Contribution to South Indian Cinema
- Suvarna Life Time Achievement Award
- Suvarna Rathna Award
- Amogha Ratna Award
- Suvarna Sadhaki Special Award
- Jana Mechhida Thare Award Dedicated by Suvarna TV
- Panorama Award For Best Dance Skills
- Honour at 82nd Kannada Sahitya Sammelana Award
