= Nenapina Doni =

- Directed by: T. S. Nagabharana
- Written by: Ananthu
- Screenplay by: T. S. Nagabharana
- Produced by: V. Verghese
- Starring: Anant Nag; Girish Karnad; Shrinath; Geetha; Roopadevi
- Cinematography: B. S. Basavaraju
- Edited by: Suresh Urs
- Music by: Vijaya Bhaskar
- Production company: Santhosh Combines
- Release date: 2 July 1986
- Country: India
- Language: Kannada

Nenapina Doni (Kannada: ನೆನಪಿನ ದೋಣಿ) is a 1986 Indian Kannada film, directed by T. S. Nagabharana and produced by V. Verghese. The film stars Anant Nag, Girish Karnad, Geetha and Roopadevi in the lead roles. The film has musical score by Vijaya Bhaskar.

== Cast ==
- Anant Nag
- Girish Karnad
- Geetha
- Roopa (credited as Roopadevi)
- Lokanath
- C. R. Simha
- M. Jayashree
- Mahima
- Venkatesh
- Sriranga
- K. V. Manjayya
- Anantha Harasur
- Master Amith
- Kavitha Bopaiah
- Veda
- Swarnamma
- Rashmi
- Swapna
- Srinath
