= Aaradhane =

- Directed by: Deepak Balraj Vij
- Written by: Deepak Balraj Vij
- Produced by: BVB
- Starring: Vishnuvardhan; Geetha; Hema Choudhary; K S Ashwath; Shivaram
- Cinematography: Lawrence D'Souza
- Edited by: R Hanumantha Rao
- Music by: Kumar
- Production company: Vijayeshwari Combines
- Release date: 30 November 1984
- Country: India
- Language: Kannada

Aaradhane is a 1984 Indian Kannada-language film, directed by Deepak Balraj Vij and produced by BVB. The film stars Vishnuvardhan, Geetha, Hema Choudhary, K. S. Ashwath and Shivaram in lead roles.

== Cast ==
- Vishnuvardhan as Rajesh
- Geetha as Geetha
- Hema Choudhary
- K S Ashwath
- Shivaram
