= Kudumbam Oru Kovil =

- Theatrical release poster
- Directed by: A. C. Tirulokchandar
- Written by: Aaroor Dass (dialogues)
- Produced by: Anandavalli Balaji
- Starring: Sivaji Ganesan; Lakshmi; Murali; Ranjini
- Cinematography: Vishwanath Rai
- Edited by: D. Vasu
- Music by: M. Ranga Rao
- Production company: Sujatha Cine Arts
- Release date: 26 January 1987
- Country: India
- Language: Tamil

Kudumbam Oru Kovil (transl. Family is a temple) is a 1987 Indian Tamil-language drama film, directed by A. C. Tirulokchandar and produced by Anandavalli Balaji. The film stars Sivaji Ganesan, Lakshmi, Murali and Ranjini. It is a remake of 1985 Hindi film Ghar Dwaar. The film had music by M. Ranga Rao who also composed for the Kannada version Maneye Manthralaya (1986).

== Cast ==
- Sivaji Ganesan as Sankar
- Lakshmi as Parvathi
- Murali as Raja
- Ranjini
- V. K. Ramasamy
- Janagaraj
- Babumohan
- Rajasulochana
- Jayamalini
- Bindu Ghosh
- S. N. Vasanth

== Production ==
It was announced in October 1986 that Balaji would be producing a film directed by Tirulokchander featuring Sivaji Ganesan and Murali in lead roles.

== Soundtrack ==
Soundtrack was composed by M. Ranga Rao and lyrics were written by Pulamaipithan.

Track listing
No.	Title	Singer(s)	Length
1.	"Kudumbam Oru Kovil"	S. P. Balasubrahmanyam, K. S. Chithra
2.	"Manmadhan Kovil"	S. P. Balasubrahmanyam, K. S. Chithra
3.	"Dilruba Raja"	Vani Jairam
4.	"Kudu Kudu"	S. P. Balasubrahmanyam, Vani Jairam

== Release and reception ==
Kudumbam Oru Koyil was released on 26 January 1987, India's Republic Day. N. Krishnaswamy of The Indian Express wrote, "For a major part of the film, Tirulokchander curiously keeps the teartaps closed or just dribbling but in the end there is a patch that is meant to trigger a flood of tears."
