= Gaali Maathu =

- VCD cover
- Directed by: Dorai–Bhagavan
- Based on: Gaali Maathu by Ta. Ra. Su
- Produced by: Dorai–Bhagavan
- Starring: Lakshmi; Jai Jagadish; Kokila Mohan; Hema Choudhary
- Cinematography: B. C. Gowrishankar
- Edited by: P. Bhaktavatsalam
- Music by: Rajan–Nagendra
- Production company: Anupam Movies
- Release date: 29 January 1981
- Running time: 130 minutes
- Country: India
- Language: Kannada

Gaali Maathu ( transl. Rumour) is a 1981 Indian Kannada-language drama film, directed and produced by the Dorai–Bhagavan duo. It is based on the novel of the same name by Ta. Ra. Su. The film stars Jai Jagadish, Lakshmi, Hema Choudhary and Kokila Mohan.

== Cast ==
- Lakshmi
- Jai Jagadish
- Kokila Mohan
- K. S. Ashwath
- Leelavathi as Shantha
- Uma Shivakumar
- Hema Choudhary
- Sampath

== Production ==
Anant Nag was initially chosen for the lead role; he was later replaced by Jai Jagadish, Sundar Raj was also replaced by Charan Raj after the former asked for more remuneration.

== Soundtrack ==
The music of the film was composed by Rajan–Nagendra, with lyrics by Chi. Udaya Shankar. All the songs composed for the film were received extremely well."Omme Ninnannu" is considered the most melodious song by S Janaki in Kannada Cinema. The song "Nagisalu Neenu" is based on Jogkauns raga.

Track listing
No.	Title	Singer(s)	Length
1.	"Naanenu Neenenu"	S. P. Balasubrahmanyam
2.	"Bayasade Bali Bande"	S. P. Balasubrahmanyam, S. Janaki
3.	"Nammura Santheli"	Nagendra, Renuka Devi
4.	"Omme Ninnannu"	S. Janaki
5.	"Nagisalu Neenu"	S. Janaki
