= Shruthi Seridaaga =

- Poster
- Directed by: Chi. Dattaraj
- Screenplay by: Singeetam Srinivasa Rao; Chi. Udaya Shankar
- Based on: Paluku Paluku Olavu by Kumuda
- Produced by: Raghavendra Rajkumar
- Starring: Rajkumar; Madhavi; Geetha; Balakrishna; K. S. Ashwath
- Cinematography: V. K. Kannan
- Edited by: P. Bhaktavatsalam
- Music by: T. G. Lingappa
- Production company: Nikhileshwari Cine Combines
- Release date: 1987
- Running time: 160 minutes
- Country: India
- Language: Kannada

Shruthi Seridaaga is a 1987 Indian Kannada-language film directed by Chi Dattaraj. The film was produced by Raghavendra Rajkumar. The film starred Rajkumar, Madhavi and Geetha. The music for the film was scored by T. G. Lingappa and the cinematography was by V. K. Kannan. The movie is based on the novel Paluku Paluku Olavu by Kumuda. Director Singeetam Srinivasa Rao co-wrote the screenplay even though he didn't direct this movie.

== Plot ==
Rajkumar plays Dr. Murthy, a surgeon, who is also a singer by hobby. On a visit to Ernakulam for a medical conference, Murthy's father (K. S. Ashwath) advises him to stay at Retd. Major Subbanna's (Balakrishna) house, who is an old-friend. Due to a mishap by his assistant, Murthy has to act as compounder and his assistant has to act as Doctor. Subbanna organises kacheri, performance by the Doctor. Murthy fills voice from behind the screen, while his assistant (M. S. Umesh) simply mouths the song Purandara Daasa's "Bombeyaatavayya" hymn. Their mischief is caught by Radha (Madhavi). Murthy falls in love with Radha, Subbanna's daughter. Subbanna is angry that his daughter has fallen in love, not with the doctor, but a lowly assistant. Murthy's father turns up to clear the confusion. Both his father and Subbanna's family visit Dharmasthala. Murthy meets his school teacher & mentor and his daughter Kamala (Geetha).

Subbanna shifts to Bangalore, intending to settle down after marrying Radha to Murthy. Murthy's teacher dies and his daughter Kamala, who is now a mental patient comes to stay at Murthy. Murthy gets her treated by Dr Jeena Das (Doddanna). Subbanna's elder brother (Parvathavani), who is an astrologer checks Murthy's hand. He predicts Murthy has dwi-patni yoga, 2 marriages, meaning Murthy's first wife would have a short-life.

Subbanna breaks the marriage, fearing for his daughter's life. Dejected Murthy confronts Subbanna, who lies his daughter is to wed her dead mother's brother in America. Subbanna lies that he would settle down at USA. Murthy ties knot with Kamala, who is now cured of mental problem. Kamala learns about Murthy' s dwi-patni yoga. Subbanna, meanwhile awaits Kamala's death. Murthy and his father confront Subbanna, who is leading a secluded life in the adjacent house. Murthy quotes Purandara Daasa's "Sakala grahabala neene sarasijaaksha" poem, which advises Devotion to Lord alone would thwart all the planetary effects. Kamala hears this conversation. Fearing she would die during child-birth, She drives to a far-off temple to pray to Goddess Parvati. Murthy, follows her, gets her delivery done in the village and returns with the kid. Radha is heartbroken and loses her mental balance after witnessing the happy couple with their newborn kid. Film ends with the conclusion that astrology has no relevance.

== Cast ==
- Rajkumar as Dr. G. N. Murthy
- Geetha as Kamala, Murthy's wife
- Madhavi as Radha, Murthy's former love interest
- K. S. Ashwath as N R Narayan Rao (Nani), Murthy's father
- Pandari Bai as Lakshmi, Murthy's mother
- T. N. Balakrishna as Subbu, Radha's father
- M. S. Umesh as Chandru, Murthy's P.A.
- Parvathavani as Subbu's Brother, An Astrologer
- Sadashiva Brahmavar as Ranganna (Kamala's father)
- Thoogudeepa Srinivas as Venkatesh, Murthy's brother
- Doddanna as Psychiatrist Dr. Jeena Das
- Bangalore Nagesh as Maya Rao, producer (Cameo appearance)
- M. S. Rajashekar as Mari Rao, director (Cameo appearance)

== Soundtrack ==
- Soundtrack cover

Soundtrack album by T. G. Lingappa
- Released: 1987
- Genre: Feature film soundtrack
- Length: 25:04
- Label: Sangeetha Music

T. G. Lingappa composed the music for the soundtracks and lyrics were written by Chi. Udaya Shankar. The album consists of six soundtracks which were hugely popular upon release.

Tracklist
No.	Title	Singer(s)	Length
1.	"Nagalarade Alalarade"	Dr. Rajkumar	4:06
2.	"Shruthi Seride"	Dr. Rajkumar, S. Janaki	4:28
3.	"Bombeyatavayya"	Dr. Rajkumar, Vani Jairam	5:58
4.	"Raaga Jeevana Raaga"	Dr. Rajkumar, Vani Jairam	4:16
5.	"Kanasalli Bandavanare"	S. Janaki	4:17
6.	"Honnina Therinali"	S. Janaki	1:59
Total length:			25:04

== Trivia ==
- The entire film story revolves around the Hindu astrology and horoscope followed during typical Hindu Marriages.
- The movie is famous for the song 'Bombeyatavayya' in which comedian role played by M. S. Umesh will be singing for the audience where in the actual singer be Rajkumar singing behind the scenes.
