= Madhuri (1989 film) =

- Directed by: K. V. Jayaram
- Written by: B. L. Venu (dialogues)
- Screenplay by: K. V. Jayaram
- Based on: Pasarisida Srigandha by Sai Suthe
- Produced by: Smt Meenakshi Jayaram
- Starring: Geetha; Vinod Alva; Lokanath; Datthathreya
- Cinematography: Rajendra C. Mapakshi
- Edited by: S. Manohar
- Music by: Sangeetha Raja
- Production company: Jayadurga Production
- Release date: 12 January 1989
- Country: India
- Language: Kannada

Madhuri is a 1989 Indian Kannada-language film, directed by K. V. Jayaram and produced by Smt Meenakshi Jayaram. The film stars Geetha, Vinod Alva, Lokanath and Datthathreya in the lead roles. The film has musical score by Sangeetha Raja.

== Cast ==
- Geetha
- Vinod Alva
- Lokanath
- Datthathreya
- Keerthi
- Sathyajith
- Mysore Lokesh
- Dingri Nagaraj
- Jr. Narasimharaju
- Honnavalli Krishna
- Pranayamurthy
- B. Ramayya
- K. Vijaya
- Suma
- Pramila Joshai
- Vijaya Somanna
- Prabhavathi
- Chethan Ramarao
- Master Adarsh
- Dhanu Suvarna
- Lokesh
