= Maate Mahadevi =

- Born: 13 March 1946; Sasalahatti, Chitradurga, Mysore State, British India
- Died: 14 March 2019 (aged 73); Bangalore, Karnataka, India
- Education: Bachelor of Science; Master of Arts
- Parent(s): Basappa (father); Gangamma (mother)

Dr Poojya Maate Mahadevi MA, B.Sc.(13 March 1946 – 14 March 2019) was an Indian Spiritual leader, scholar, mystic, writer and first female Jagadguru, spiritual head of the Indian Lingayat community.

== Early life ==
Following initiation in 1965 by Lingananda Swami, Maate Mahadevi began writing vachanas, a form of didactic poetry. In 1966 she received her Jangama initiation as an ascetic in the Lingayat order of wandering mendicants. In 1970 she was installed as a jagadguru in the Lingayat community, the first time a woman had been placed in that position. She held the 12th century woman poet Akka Mahadevi, who also wrote vachanas, as her role model.

By 1983 she had published twenty books and started an educational and religious institution called Jaganmata Akka Mahadevi Ashrama in Dharwad, Karnataka, whose focus is education and spiritual upliftment of girls and women. Among her many books is Basava Tatva Darshana, on the life and teachings of Basava, a 12th-century social reformer and philosopher who fought against the caste system.

== Filmography ==
Year	Film	Screenwriter	Writer	Dialogue Writer	Lyrics Writer
1983	Kranthiyogi Basavanna	Yes	Yes	Yes	Yes
