= S. Ashok Kumar =

Indian judge

Justice S. Ashok Kumar
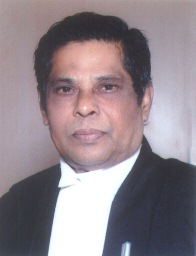

Judge, Madras High Court
- In office 3 April 2003 – 21 March 2008

Judge, Andhra Pradesh High Court
- In office 24 March 2008 – 17 July 2009

Personal details
- Born: 20 July 1947 Thenkalampudur, Tirunelveli, India
- Died: 25 October 2009 (aged 62) Chennai, Tamil Nadu, India
- Spouse: Ebi Ashok Kumar
- Children: Augustin Baskar; Edwin Prabakar; Bobby Arun; Brindha Ashok Kumar

Justice S. Ashok Kumar (20 July 1947 – 25 October 2009) was a judge of the Madras High Court and the Andhra Pradesh High Court in India.

== Early life and career ==
He was born on 20 July 1947 to a teacher couple, the late Mr. S. Santiago and the late Mrs. Saveriammal, in a small village of Tirunelveli district called Thenkalam Pudur which comes under the administration of Thenkalam Panchayat.

Despite hardships, both social and economic, he went on to study 1st form to P.U.C at St. Xavier’s High School and College, Palayamkottai; B.Sc at St. John’s College, Palayamkottai. M.Sc at St. Joseph's College, Tiruchirapalli and Bachelor of Law at Dr. Ambedkar Government Law College, Chennai. He practiced at Thirunelveli bar council from 1971 to 1987.

During his tenure at the bar he was greatly moved towards the cause of people. This led him to contest twice, unsuccessfully, the Tamil Nadu assembly elections, in 1977 and 1980. He later decided to keep away from active politics and went on to look for ways to help the community through the legal fraternity.

His zeal to serve the downtrodden made him appear in the Justice K. S. Ramamurthy Commission, which was set up on his insistence, investigating the rape of 17 Dalit women in Sankanankulam village, India in 1980-81 on behalf of the victims, fighting for their cause. In fact, he took some of the victims to meet the then Prime Minister of India Indira Gandhi to brief her about the gravity of the situation and ultimately saw to it that justice was done for the victims. After noticing his dedication and commitment towards the society, the then Chief Minister of Tamil Nadu Thiru M. G. Ramachandran appointed him to assist Shri Ashoke Kumar Sen in the commission investigating the IMFL Licensing system in 1983-84. He always looked for inspiration towards Shri Sen, a towering personality in stature and knowledge, who held the Office of the Union Law Minister in three cabinets - Jawaharlal Nehru, Indira Gandhi and Rajiv Gandhi.

Justice Ashok Kumar died on 25 October 2009 at a private hospital after a brief illness.

== Judgeship ==
S. Ashok Kumar was appointed as directly recruited District and Sessions Judge on 16 November 1987. He served as Trainee District Judge, Coimbatore from 1987–1988; subsequently he was posted in the following stations:

- Additional District Judge, Ramnad from June 1988 to May 1989
- Presiding Officer, E. C. Court and Consumer court, Coimbatore from June 1989 to 1991
- Presiding Officer, Additional & Principal Labour Courts, Madras from 1991 to 1994
- Principal District Judge, Dindigul from 1994 to 1995
- Principal District Judge, Thiruvannamalai from 1995 to 1997
- Presiding Officer, Industrial Tribunal, Madras from 1997 to 2000
- Principal District Judge, Cuddalore from June 2000 to September 2000
- Principal Judge, City Civil Court, Chennai, from October 2000 to April 2002
- Principal District Judge, Krishnagiri from May 2002 till the date of elevation as:
- Judge, Madras High Court on 3 April 2003
- Transferred to Andhra Pradesh High Court and took charge on 24 March 2008
- Retired on 17 July 2009

During his stint at Dindugal, alleged henchmen of the then incumbent government occupied the Kodaikanal International School in the middle of the night thereby evicting all the resident students from their boarding quarters. His timely intervention restored the school back to the school authorities. This seemed to have enraged the then incumbent government who immediately transferred him to Thiruvannamalai.

== Justice Katju’s allegations ==
On 21 July 2014, Press Council of India Chairman and former Supreme Court judge Justice Markandey Katju made allegations of corruption in the judiciary. Katju alleged that a District Judge in Tamil Nadu, later revealed to be Justice S. Ashok Kumar, was elevated to the position of Additional Judge of the Madras High Court despite charges of corruption against him. Katju alleged that the judge had been directly appointed as a District Judge in Tamil Nadu and during his career as district judge, there were as many as eight adverse entries against him recorded by various portfolio judges of the Madras High Court. Katju has alleged that one acting Chief Justice of the Madras High Court deleted all those adverse entries and consequently S. Ashok Kumar became an Additional Judge of the High Court. He has said that the judge had the solid support of a very important political leader of Tamil Nadu.

== Controversial Extensions as Judge ==
Judge Ashok Kumar gave bail to Karunanidhi's son Stalin and others on 6 July 2001. Ashok Kumar was elevated as Additional Judge of Madras High Court in April 2003, a period when the DMK was part of the NDA. Ashok Kumar was given a four-month extension along with his batch in April 2005, then another extension for a year in August 2005, then another six months in August 2006, confirmed in February 2007. While the DMK has now been accused of openly campaigning for the judge, courtroom gossip in Chennai is that the AIADMK at that time did everything in its capacity to stall his appointments. In fact, Ashok Kumar's tenure has been so controversial that his extension and confirmation as permanent judge has been questioned twice in court.

=== "Is your heart made of muscle or mud?" ===
He again proved his mettle while dealing with a case in which 78-year-old former Chief Minister (as he then was) Mr. M. Karunanidhi was arrested at midnight by the police at later produced before Ashok Kumar around 4:30 a.m. and was remanded to judicial custody. As a judge he was annoyed that the police did not heed his specific directive that Mr. Karunanidhi should be first medically examined at the Government General Hospital, Chennai, before being taken to the prison and he said "the whole world has seen Karunanidhi sitting like a beggar before the central prison, begging for medical treatment." He famously asked the police, "a 78-year old man suffering from various ailments. Is your heart made of muscle or mud? What was the pressure on you?"

He courageously dealt with all the political pressure and hurdles that followed, including an attempt on his life.

The Hindu, the national daily, observed that Mr. Ashok Kumar is a firm believer that judicial pronouncements have to be severe, when it comes to protecting rights in a civil society. The judge observed, "Time may change, people may change, but law should not change". "About the occupational hazards and working in a pressure-cooker atmosphere at times, with intimidation of various kinds thrown in for good measure, he says he is not very concerned. One should not spend too much time worrying about threats, he says". "Though Judges are expected to keep their thoughts to themselves, Mr. Ashok Kumar differs. His court always witnesses elaborate consideration of issues, where he points out mistakes and seeks clarification from both prosecution and defence. He gives enough opportunity, and if they still fail to make the best use of it, they have none to blame but themselves".

"The orders of this Judge, as the average citizen has found, combine sharp, but impersonal law points and a subtle warning to keep executive excesses well under check".
