= Asambhava =

1986 film by D. Rajendra Babu

- Directed by: D. Rajendra Babu
- Written by: H. V. Subba Rao
- Screenplay by: D. Rajendra Babu
- Produced by: H. N. Maruthi; Venugopal
- Starring: V. Ravichandran; Ambika; Mukhyamantri Chandru; Lakshman
- Cinematography: D. Prasad Babu
- Music by: Shankar–Ganesh
- Production company: Parimala Arts
- Release date: 23 June 1986
- Running time: 126 minutes
- Country: India
- Language: Kannada

Asambhava ( transl. Impossible) is a 1986 Indian Kannada film, directed by D. Rajendra Babu and produced by H. N. Maruthi and Venugopal. The film stars V. Ravichandran, Ambika, Mukhyamantri Chandru and Lakshman in the lead roles. The film has musical score by Shankar–Ganesh.

== Cast ==
- V. Ravichandran as Veerabhadra
- Ambika
- Mukhyamantri Chandru
- Lakshman
- Sumithra
- Umashree
