= Kathanayaka =

- VCD cover
- Directed by: P. Vasu
- Screenplay by: P. Vasu
- Produced by: P. Vimal Kumar; R Vijayalakshmi
- Starring: Vishnuvardhan; Sumalatha; Vajramuni; Seema
- Cinematography: M. C. Shekar
- Edited by: P. Venkateshwara Rao
- Music by: M. Ranga Rao
- Production company: Sri Gajalakshmi Combines
- Release date: 10 January 1986
- Country: India
- Language: Kannada

Kathanayaka is a 1986 Indian Kannada-language action drama film written and directed by P. Vasu, and produced by P. Vimal Kumar and R. Vijayalakshmi under Sri Gajalakshmi Combines. The film stars Vishnuvardhan, Sumalatha, Vajramuni and Seema in the lead roles. The film has musical score by M. Ranga Rao.

Kathanayaka marks P. Vasu's directorial debut in Kannada.

== Plot ==
In the dense forests of Karnataka, an honest forest officer becomes a victim of a sinister plot orchestrated by a powerful and unscrupulous man (Ranga's uncle), who is deeply involved in illegal activities. Ranga, a courageous young man, stumbles upon the dark secret that his own uncle is the one responsible for the heinous murder of the forest officer. Determined to bring justice to the slain officer and stop his uncle's nefarious deeds, Ranga sets out to expose the truth.

However, before Ranga can reveal the evidence, he meets a tragic end at the hands of his ruthless uncle. The news of Ranga’s untimely death shatters his family, especially his twin brother, Prabhakar, who bears a striking resemblance to Ranga.

Fueled by grief and a burning desire for retribution, Prabhakar vows to avenge his brother's murder. Stepping into Ranga's shoes, Prabhakar embarks on a perilous journey to uncover the truth, dismantle his uncle's criminal empire, and ensure that justice is served. Along the way, he faces numerous challenges and dangers, but his resolve remains unshaken.

With courage and determination, Prabhakar battles against corruption and evil, striving to fulfill his brother's unfinished mission and restore peace to their community.

== Cast ==
- Vishnuvardhan as Ranga / Prabhu
- Sumalatha as Sujatha
- Vajramuni as Dasappa
- Leelavathi
- Srinivasa Murthy as Forest Officer Kumar
- Seema as Inspector Girija
- Dinesh
- Umesh
- Sathish
- Sundar Raj as Mahesh
- V. R. Bhashar
- Krishna Rao
- Kamala
- Vijayabarathi
- Srilakshmi
- Shakunthala

== Production ==
Kathanayaka is the first film independently directed by P. Vasu, following his split from Santhana Bharathi.
