= Veeradhi Veera =

- Directed by: Vijay
- Written by: Sri Uma Productions Unit
- Screenplay by: M. D. Sundar
- Produced by: N. N. Bhat
- Starring: Vishnuvardhan; Geetha; Vajramuni; Sudheer
- Cinematography: Kabir Lal
- Edited by: K. Ramamohana Rao
- Music by: M. Ranga Rao
- Production company: Sri Uma Productions
- Release date: 27 February 1985
- Country: India
- Language: Kannada

Veeradhi Veera is a 1985 Indian Kannada-language film, directed by Vijay and produced by N. N. Bhat. The film stars Vishnuvardhan, Geetha, Vajramuni and Sudheer. The film has musical score by M. Ranga Rao. This was the last film of Musuri Krishnamurthy before his death.

== Cast ==
- Vishnuvardhan
- Geetha
- Vajramuni
- Sudheer
- Mukhyamantri Chandru
- Musuri Krishnamurthy
- N. S. Rao
- Doddanna
- Kanchana
- Soumyashree
- Rani
- Shakila
- Baby Rekha
- Ravichandra
- B. K. Shankar
- Chikkanna
- Karantha
- Master Chethan

== Soundtrack ==
The music was composed by M. Ranga Rao.

No.	Song	Singers	Lyrics	Length (m:ss)
1	"Premada Vijaya Thande"	S. Janaki, S. P. Balasubrahmanyam	Chi. Udaya Shankar	04:49
2	"Bittorunte Intha"	S. P. Balasubrahmanyam	Chi. Udaya Shankar	03:56
3	"Baalinalli Intha"	S. Janaki	Chi. Udaya Shankar	04:32
4	"Ellige Ee Payana"	S. Janaki, S. P. Balasubrahmanyam	Chi. Udaya Shankar	04:18
