= Giri Baale =

- Directed by: B. Mallesh
- Written by: M. K. Indira
- Screenplay by: B. Mallesh
- Produced by: N. Venkatesh; V. S. Shyamasundar; Smt Prabhavathi Kantharaj; K. V. Rao
- Starring: Ambareesh; Geetha; Shobhana; K. S. Ashwath
- Cinematography: B. S. Basavaraj
- Edited by: S. Manohar
- Music by: Rajan–Nagendra
- Production company: Sri Amba Bhavani Art Films
- Release date: 1 July 1985
- Country: India
- Language: Kannada

Giri Baale is a 1985 Indian Kannada film, directed by B. Mallesh and produced by N. Venkatesh, V. S. Shyamasundar, Smt Prabhavathi Kantharaj and K. V. Rao. The film stars Ambareesh, Geetha, Shobhana and K. S. Ashwath in the lead roles. The film has musical score by Rajan–Nagendra. The film marked Malayalam actress, Shobana in her major Kannada debut.

== Cast ==
- Ambareesh
- Geetha
- Shobhana as Neelaveni
- K. S. Ashwath
- Lokanath
- Thoogudeepa Srinivas
- Shakti Prasad
- Mysore Lokesh
- Dinesh
- Musuri Krishnamurthy
- Hanumanthachar
- B. Mallesh
- Leelavathi
- Shashikala
- Shyamala
- Baby Rekha N.
- Nagaraj
- V.S. Shyamasundar in Guest Appearance
- N. Venkatesh in Guest Appearance
