= Maneye Manthralaya =

- VCD cover
- Directed by: H. R. Bhargava
- Written by: Chi. Udaya Shankar
- Screenplay by: H. R. Bhargava
- Produced by: Anuradha Singh; Dushyanth Singh; Amritha Singh
- Starring: Anant Nag; Bharathi; Jai Jagadish
- Cinematography: D. V. Rajaram
- Edited by: Goutham Raju
- Music by: M. Ranga Rao
- Production company: Rohini Pictures
- Distributed by: Rohini Pictures
- Release date: 6 November 1986
- Running time: 128 min
- Country: India
- Language: Kannada

Maneye Manthralaya is a 1986 Indian Kannada film, directed by H. R. Bhargava and produced by Anuradha Singh, Dushyanth Singh and Amritha Singh. The film stars Anant Nag, Bharathi, Jai Jagadish and Mukhyamantri Chandru in the lead roles. It is a remake of Hindi film Ghar Dwaar. The film had music by M. Ranga Rao who also composed for the Tamil version Kudumbam Oru Kovil (1987).

== Cast ==
- Anant Nag
- Bharathi
- Jai Jagadish
- Tara
- Ramesh Aravind
- Nagesh Yadav
- Mukhyamantri Chandru
- Dingri Nagaraj
- Umashree
- Uma Shivakumar
- Mysore Lokesh
- Shanthamma
- Kavya Krishnamurthy
- Sangram Singh
- Jairaj Singh
- Pranaya Murthy
- Master Sanjay
- Master Chethan
- Baby Pramodhini
- Radha
- Sapna

== Soundtrack ==
The music was composed by M. Ranga Rao.

No.	Song	Singers	Lyrics	Length (m:ss)
1	"Maneye Mantralaya"	S. Janaki, K. J. Yesudas, Ramesh, Manjula	Chi. Udaya Shankar	04:21
2	"Endendu Baalali"	S. Janaki, K. J. Yesudas, Ramesh, Manjula	Chi. Udaya Shankar	04:05
3	"Baarisu Baarisu"	S. Janaki, Ramesh	Chi. Udaya Shankar	04:43
4	"Maneye Baridayithu"	S. Janaki, K. J. Yesudas	Chi. Udaya Shankar	03:58
5	"Happy Birth Day"	S. Janaki, K. J. Yesudas	Chi. Udaya Shankar	08:01
