= Mrugaalaya =

- DVD cover
- Directed by: V. Somashekhar
- Written by: M. P. Shankar
- Screenplay by: V. Somashekhar
- Produced by: M. P. Shankar
- Starring: Ambareesh; Geetha; Shivaram; Sundar Krishna Urs
- Cinematography: D. V. Rajaram
- Edited by: Victor Yadav
- Music by: Rajan–Nagendra
- Production company: Bharani Chithra
- Release date: 29 April 1986
- Country: India
- Language: Kannada

Mrugaalaya is a 1986 Indian Kannada-language action drama film directed by V. Somashekhar and produced by M. P. Shankar. The film stars Ambareesh, Geetha, Shivaram and Sundar Krishna Urs. The film has musical score by Rajan–Nagendra. The film was dubbed in Malayalam as Mrugasalayil.

== Premise ==
Vijay Kumar notices illegal activities taking place at the zoo where he works and fights against them in order to conserve wild animals.

== Cast ==
- Ambareesh
- Geetha
- Shivaram
- Sundar Krishna Urs
- Sudheer
- Rathnakar
- Leelavathi
- Pramila Joshai
- Soumya
- Chandralekha
- Mysore Sharada
- Baby Padmini
- Rajashekar
- Seema
- Sheela
- Pushpa
- Hemashree
- Baby Shobha
- Shakunthala
- Padma Thalakadu
- Rajanand in Guest Appearance
- Chethan Ramarao in Guest Appearance
- Bangalore Nagesh in Guest Appearance
- Mysore Lokesh in Guest Appearance
- Honnavalli Krishna in Guest Appearance
- M. P. Shankar in dual roles

== Soundtrack ==
The music was composed by Rajan–Nagendra.

No.	Song	Singers	Lyrics	Length (m:ss)
1	"Maagiya Kaala"	Vani Jairam	Chi. Udaya Shankar	04:47
2	"Aalaya Mrugaalaya"	S. P. Balasubrahmanyam	Chi. Udaya Shankar	04:31
3	"Kudure Savaariya"	Vani Jairam, S. P. Balasubrahmanyam	Chi. Udaya Shankar	04:33
4	"Mella Mellane"	S. Janaki	Purandara Dasa	04:51
