= Karna (1986 film) =

- Title card
- Directed by: H. R. Bhargava
- Written by: Chi. Udaya Shankar
- Screenplay by: H. R. Bhargava
- Based on: Saaheb (1985) by Anil Ganguly
- Produced by: B. Anuradha Singh; R. Dushyanth Singh; R. Amritha Singh
- Starring: Vishnuvardhan; Sumalatha; Sumithra; K. S. Ashwath; Gangadhar
- Cinematography: D. V. Rajaram
- Edited by: V. P. Krishna
- Music by: M. Ranga Rao
- Production companies: Amrutha Arts; Rohini Pictures
- Distributed by: Amrutha Arts; Rohini Pictures
- Release date: 10 January 1986
- Running time: 148 min
- Country: India
- Language: Kannada

Karna is a 1986 Indian Kannada-language film, directed by H. R. Bhargava and produced by B. Anuradha Singh, R. Dushyanth Singh and R. Amritha Singh. The film stars Vishnuvardhan, Sumalatha, K. S. Ashwath and Sumithra. The film has musical score by M. Ranga Rao. The film was a remake of the 1981 Bengali film Saheb Starring Tapas Paul and Utpal Dutt, Directed by Bijoy Bose which was also earlier remade in Hindi as Saaheb.

== Cast ==
- Vishnuvardhan as Karna
- Sumalatha
- Sumithra
- K. S. Ashwath
- Gangadhar
- Shivaram
- Lakshman
- Saikumar
- Jayakumar
- Rajanand
- Chethan Ramarao
- Thimmayya
- Bharathkumar
- Shivaprakash
- Suryakumar
- Phani Ramachandra
- Swagath Jayaram
- A. S. Balu
- Kittu
- Murali
- Samyuktha
- Prashanthi
- Kokila
- K. N. Bharathi
- Sathyabhama
- M. Jayashree
- Baby Rashma Bhargav
- Kumari Seetha
- Master Sathish
- Master Ganesh
- Rajesh in Special Appearance
- Sangram Singh in Special Appearance
- Thoogudeepa Srinivas in Special Appearance

== Soundtrack ==
Music was composed by M. Rangarao. The song "Pyaar Bina Chhen" from the original Hindi film has been reused as "Preethiya Nannusiru".

- "Tharam Pam" – SPB, S. Janaki
- "Chuku Chuku Bidi" – S. Janaki
- "Aahaa Nanna" – SPB
- "Aa Karnananthe" – K. J. Yesudas
- "Preethiye" – SPB, S. Janaki
