= Aruna Raaga =

1986 film directed by K. V. Jayaram

- Directed by: K. V. Jayaram
- Written by: Rekha Kakhandaki
- Screenplay by: K. V. Jayaram
- Based on: Aruna Raaga by Rekha Khakandaki
- Produced by: Meenakshi Jayaram; Rohini
- Starring: Anant Nag; Geetha; K. S. Ashwath
- Cinematography: R. C. Mapakshi
- Edited by: S. Manohar
- Music by: M. Ranga Rao
- Production company: Jayadurga Films
- Release date: 1986
- Running time: 151 minutes
- Country: India
- Language: Kannada

Aruna Raaga is a 1986 Indian Kannada-language action drama film, starring Anant Nag and Geetha. It was directed by K. V. Jayaram and is based on the novel of the same name, written by Rekha Kakhandaki. It was produced by Jayadurga Films.

== Plot ==
Sumesh (a doctor) marries Janhavi. He aspires to imitate western culture while Janhavi does not. Sumesh leaves the country for work and promises Janhavi that she would join him soon. Time goes by but he does not keep his promise.

Janhavi goes to live with her father and decides to become a doctor. Years later Sumesh returns as a professor at the same medical college where Janhavi is known as Dr. Janaki. The rest of the movie deals with how their marital life is restored.

== Cast ==
- Anant Nag as Sumesh
- Geetha as Janhavi/Janaki
- K. S. Ashwath as Raghavayya, Sumesh's father
- Pandari Bai as Kaveramma, Sumesh's mother
- Loknath as Ramayya, Janaki's father
- Sundar Krishna Urs as Devobhava
- Sudha Narasimharaju (Debut) as Seetha
- Umesh Navale as Rajesh
- Satyajeet
- Dingri Nagaraj as Sanju Hopspital warden
- C. P. Yogeshwara as Shekhara, student leader.
- Ma Pradeep, Raju Sumesh brother
- Shyamala as Vegetable vendor

== Soundtrack ==
All the songs are composed and scored by M. Ranga Rao.

S. No.	Song title	Singer(s)	Lyricist
1	"Naanondu Theera"	K. J. Yesudas, K. S. Chithra	Doddarangegowda
2	"Hoovantha Hrudayavanu"	K. S. Chithra	Doddarangegowda
3	"Nee Bareda Olavina Ole"	S. Janaki	Doddarangegowda
4	"Nadedado Kamana Bille"	S. P. Balasubrahmanyam	Doddarangegowda
5	"Hagalu Rathri Sagide"	S. P. Balasubrahmanyam	Doddarangegowda

== Awards ==
- Karnataka State Film Award for Best Actress - Geetha
