= Mamatheya Madilu =

- Directed by: Eeranki Sharma
- Written by: Anasuya Ramareddy
- Screenplay by: Eeranki Sharma
- Produced by: J. Chandulal Jain
- Starring: Ambareesh; Geetha; Sandhya; Srinivasa Murthy
- Cinematography: B. S. Lokanath
- Edited by: D. Venkata Rathnam
- Music by: M. S. Viswanathan
- Production company: Master Productions
- Release date: 1985
- Country: India
- Language: Kannada

Mamatheya Madilu is a 1985 Indian Kannada-language film, directed by Eeranki Sharma and produced by J. Chandulal Jain. The film stars Ambareesh, Geetha, Sandhya and Srinivasa Murthy. The film has musical score by M. S. Viswanathan.

== Cast ==
- Ambareesh as Dr Anand
- Geetha as Sunitha
- Sandhya as Vimala
- Srinivasa Murthy as Anand
- Shivaram as Dr Subbaramaiah
- Sadashiva Brahmavar as Vasudevaiah
- Bheema Rao
- Aravind
- Srshailam
- Ra Shi Naidu
- M. G. Hiremath
- Doddayya
- Vaishali Kasaravalli as Leela
- Shyamala
- Sathyabhama
- Indushree
- Manjumalini
- Mysore Sharada
- Supriya
- Tara (cameo)
- Soumyashree
- Bharathi Vishnuvardhan (cameo)
- Baby Rekha
- Baby Manjula
- Baby Latha

== Production ==
In an interview, Ambareesh said that his character in Mamatheya Madilu had a lot of scope for performance.

== Soundtrack ==
The music was composed by M. S. Viswanathan.

No.	Song	Singers	Lyrics	Length (m:ss)
1	"Chinna Nanna Ninna"	K. J. Yesudas	R. N. Jayagopal	04:27
