= Pithamaha =

- Directed by: K. S. L. Swamy
- Written by: Subhash Ghai
- Based on: Vidhaata (Hindi)
- Produced by: Sangram Singh; Jairam Singh
- Starring: Rajesh; Udaykumar; V. Ravichandran; Jai Jagadish; Vijayalakshmi Singh
- Cinematography: D. V. Rajaram
- Edited by: V. P. Krishnan
- Music by: M. Ranga Rao
- Production company: Singh Brothers
- Release date: 1985
- Running time: 134 minutes
- Country: India
- Language: Kannada

Pithamaha is a 1985 Indian Kannada-language film directed by K. S. L. Swamy (Ravi) and produced by the Singh Brothers. The film stars Rajesh, Udaykumar, V. Ravichandran and Vijayalakshmi Singh. The music was composed by M. Ranga Rao, while the lyrics and dialogues were written by Chi. Udaya Shankar. The film was a remake of the 1982 Hindi film Vidhaata.

== Cast ==
- Rajesh as Viraj
- Udaykumar as Govindu
- V. Ravichandran as Shankar
- Vijayalakshmi Singh as Girija
- Jai Jagadish as Devappa
- Sundar Krishna Urs as Srikhantaiah
- Dheerendra Gopal as Bangaru
- Thoogudeepa Srinivas as Sarjappa Nayaka
- Mysore Lokesh
- Bank Janardhan
- Keerthi Raj as Ganga
- Ashwath Narayan

== Soundtrack ==
The music was composed by M. Ranga Rao, with lyrics by Chi. Udaya Shankar. All the songs composed for the film were well-received, especially "Mareyadiru Aa Shaktiya," which is considered an evergreen song.

Track listing
No.	Title	Lyrics	Singer(s)	Length
1.	"Angailiruva Rekheye"	Chi. Udaya Shankar	S. P. Balasubrahmanyam, K. J. Yesudas
2.	"Ellara Mane Doseyu"	Chi. Udaya Shankar	S. P. Balasubrahmanyam, S. Janaki
3.	"Kudi Baa Kudi Baa"	Chi. Udaya Shankar	Ravi, S. Janaki
4.	"Mareyadiru Aa Shaktiyaa"	Chi. Udaya Shankar	K. J. Yesudas
