= Geetha (actress) =

Indian actress (born 1962)

- Born: Geetha Kadambee; Tamil Nadu, India
- Occupation: Actress
- Years active: 1978–1998; 2003–present
- Spouse: Vasan Thatham (m. 1997)
- Children: 1

Geetha is an Indian actress who appears in Malayalam, Telugu, Kannada, Tamil, Hindi, and Tulu films. She debuted in the Tamil film Bairavi (as Rajinikanth's sister). Since then, she has appeared in more than 200 films in all major South Indian languages, and in a few Hindi films. Geetha has won two Filmfare Awards South as well as, Kerala State Film Awards and Karnataka State Film Awards.

== Career ==
Geetha made her film debut with the 1978 Tamil film Bairavi, as the title character in which she played Rajinikanth's sister. She was in her seventh grade when she was cast for the film. She later discontinued her studies to concentrate on her acting career. Her performance as Indira in the 1986 Malayalam film Panchagni based on the true life story of a Naxalite revolutionary Ajitha, received critical acclaim and described by The Hindu as "one of Malayalam cinema's landmark heroines". The same year, she appeared in several other Malayalam films including Sukhamo Devi, Kshamichu Ennoru Vakku, Aavanazhi, and Geetham. She won the Kerala State Film Award for Second Best Actress in 1989 for Oru Vadakkan Veeragatha. Most of her notable performances were with Mammootty and Mohanlal.

Her notable Kannada films are with Rajkumar, Ananth Nag, Vishnuvardhan and Ambareesh. Some of her notable films include Dhruva Thare, Devatha Manushya, Anuraga Aralithu, Shruthi Seridaaga, and Aakasmika with Rajkumar. Other films are Eradu Rekhegalu, Mareyada Manikya, Mrugaalaya, Veeradhi Veera, Mithileya Seethayaru, Nenapina Doni, Bairavi, Shiva Mecchida, Giri Baale, Ramanna Shamanna, Goonda Guru, Nigooda Rahasya, Ramapurada Ravana, Prachanda Kulla, Hrudaya Pallavi, Daada, Aaradhane, Shabarimale Swamy Ayyappa and Aruna Raaga. She was romantically paired with Ambareesh in more than fifteen films.

Geetha also appeared in Tamil serials including Kai Alavu Manasu and Engirindho Vanthaal, both directed by K. Balachander. She also starred in Tamil serials including Katha Kathayaam Karanamaam and Rajakumari, where she played Ramya Krishnan's mother which aired on Sun TV.

She did a cameo as Kamal Haasan's dance partner for the song "Ve Vela Gopemmala" in K. Viswanath's Sagara Sangamam. The Malayalam dubbed version was also a hit and "Karmegha Varnnante Maril" made her popular in Kerala before her debut in Panjagni.

== Personal life ==
In 1997, she married Vasan Thatham, an American CPA and Indian chartered accountant. The couple lived in New Jersey, where Vasan is a business promoter and advisor to corporations. The couple have one son who was born in 1999.

After her marriage, she took a break from acting from 1998 to 2002. She returned to acting in 2003 and has played the hero's mother roles in films such as Nuvvostanante Nenoddantana, Okkadu, Pournami, Unakkum Enakkum, Santosh Subramaniam, Sivakasi, Azhagiya Tamil Magan, Masters and Anwar. She has since moved to Chennai.

== Filmography ==
=== Malayalam ===
| Year | Film | Role | Notes |
|---|---|---|---|
| 1981 | Garjanam | Rekha | |
| 1986 | Panchagni | Indira | Voiced by Anandavally |
| 1986 | Sukhamo Devi | Thara | Voiced by Anandavally |
| 1986 | Kshamichu Ennoru Vakku | Sreedevi | Voiced by Anandavally |
| 1986 | Rareeram | Radha teacher | Voiced by Anandavally |
| 1986 | Aavanazhi | Seetha | Voiced by Anandavally |
| 1986 | Ente Sonia | Anitha | Voiced by Anandavally |
| 1986 | Geetham | Aparna, Atheena | Dual role |
| 1986 | Sayam Sandhya | Uma | Voiced by Anandavally |
| 1987 | Nirabhedhangal | Shalini | Voiced by Anandavally |
| 1987 | Rithubhedam | Devu | Voiced by Anandavally |
| 1987 | Vrutham | Radha | Voiced by Anandavally |
| 1987 | Sruthi | Subhadra Thampuratti | |
| 1987 | Amrutham Gamaya | Bhanu | Voiced by Anandavally |
| 1987 | Athinumappuram | Rekha | Voiced by Anandavally |
| 1988 | Theruvu Narthaki | Rema | Voiced by Anandavally |
| 1988 | Innaleyude Baakki | Sumathi | Voiced by Anandavally |
| 1988 | Vaishali | Malini | Voiced by Anandavally |
| 1988 | Bhadrachitta | Bhadra | Voiced by Anandavally |
| 1989 | Chakkikotha Chankaran | Shailaja | Voiced by Anandavally |
| 1989 | Oru Vadakkan Veeragatha | Kunji | Second Best Actress |
| 1990 | Ammayude Swantham Kunju Mary | Clara | Voiced by Anandavally |
| 1990 | Nair Saab | Seetha/Savitri | Voiced by Anandavally |
| 1990 | Radha Madhavam | Sudha | Voiced by Anandavally |
| 1990 | Lal Salam | Sethulakshmi | |
| 1990 | Indrajaalam | Jayanthi | Voiced by Anandavally |
| 1990 | Iyer the Great | Vani | Voiced by Anandavally |
| 1991 | Irrikku M.D. Akathudu | | Voiced by Anandavally |
| 1991 | Athirathan | Devu | Voiced by Bhagyalakshmi |
| 1991 | Pookkalam Varavayi | Usha | |
| 1991 | Parallel College | Sridevi | |
| 1991 | Abhimanyu | Kiran | |
| 1991 | Kuruppinte Kanakku Pustakom | Adv.Vasantha | |
| 1991 | Inspector Balram | Seetha | |
| 1991 | Arangu | Aparna Menon | |
| 1992 | Sathyaprathinja | Suma | |
| 1992 | Welcome to Kodaikanal | Doctor | |
| 1992 | Thalastaanam | Meera Menon | |
| 1992 | Priyapetta Kukku | Maya | |
| 1992 | Kunjikuruvi | | |
| 1992 | Aadhaaram | Sethulakshmi | Filmfare Award for Best Actress – Malayalam |
| 1992 | Mahaan | Neena Fernandez | |
| 1992 | My Dear Muthachan | Sreedevi | Photo only |
| 1993 | Sthalathe Pradhana Payyans | Suja Cheriyan | |
| 1993 | Uppukandam Brothers | Alice Uppukandam | |
| 1993 | Paithrukam | Gayathri | |
| 1993 | Oru Kadankatha Pole | Radha | |
| 1993 | Mafia | Sandra | |
| 1993 | Ghoshayaathra | Shakeela | |
| 1993 | Janam | Susheela | |
| 1993 | Ekalavyan | Maya Menon | |
| 1993 | City Police | Dr.Jessy | |
| 1993 | Bhoomi Geetham | Indulekha | |
| 1993 | Vatsalyam | Malathy | |
| 1993 | Harichandanam | | |
| 1994 | Rudraksham | Rathnam | |
| 1994 | Chief Minister K. R. Gowthami | Gouthami | |
| 1994 | Bharanakoodam | Manju | |
| 1994 | Sukham Sukhakaram | Guest Appearance | |
| 1994 | Rajadhani | Collector Asha | |
| 1994 | Nandini Oppol | Nandini Oppol | |
| 1995 | Saadaram | Seetha | |
| 1995 | Sreeragam | Indu | |
| 1995 | Street | Professor Vijayalakshmi | |
| 1995 | Dominic Presentation | Indu Varma IPS | |
| 1995 | Prayikkara Pappan | Gauri | |
| 1995 | Ezharakoottam | Susan | |
| 1995 | Kakkakum Poochakkum Kalyanam | Dr.Padmaja | |
| 1995 | Mumpe Parakkunna Pakshi | | |
| 1996 | Yuvathurki | Ambikaratnam | |
| 1997 | Ezhunilappanthal | | Unreleased |
| 1997 | Adukkala Rahasyam Angaadi Paattu | Mary | |
| 1997 | Five Star Hospital | Dr.Subbalakshmi | |
| 1997 | Kannur | Aswathy | |
| 1997 | Sankeerthanam Pole | Achamma | |
| 1998 | Gamyam | Janaki | |
| 2000 | Melevaryathe Malakhakkuttikal | Vasundhara | |
| 2004 | Greetings | Kasthuri | |
| 2007 | Mouryan | | |
| 2007 | November Rain | Indira | |
| 2007 | Panthaya Kozhi | Madhavi | Voiced by Bhagyalakshmi |
| 2008 | Shambu | Shankari Mayadevan | |
| 2008 | Novel | | |
| 2010 | Anwar | Anwar's mother | |
| 2011 | Uppukandam Brothers: Back in Action | Alice | Archive footage Cameo |
| 2012 | Masters | Mythri | |
| 2012 | Mallu Singh | Harinder's mother | |
| 2013 | Zachariayude Garbhinikal | Sister Jasmine Jennifer | Nominated - Filmfare Award South for Best Supporting Actress |
| 2013 | Progress Report | Radhika | |
| 2013 | North 24 Kaatham | Maya | |
| 2014 | Salalah Mobiles | Safiyumma | Voiced by Zeenath |
| 2018 | Johny Johny Yes Appa | Gracy | |
| 2019 | Aniyan Kunjum Thannalayathu | Gracy | |
| 2021 | Djibouti | Loui's mother | |

=== Telugu ===
| Year | Film | Role | Notes |
|---|---|---|---|
| 1978 | Mana Voori Pandavulu | Sinni | |
| 1979 | Iddaru Asadhyule | Geetha | |
| 1979 | Andamaina Anubhavam | | |
| 1979 | Karthika Deepam | Geetha | |
| 1979 | Cheyyethi Jai Kottu | Chandri | |
| 1979 | Sri Rama Bantu | Seetha | |
| 1980 | Thathayya Premaleelalu | | |
| 1980 | Sivamethina Satyam | Lakshmi | |
| 1980 | Cinema Pichodu | | |
| 1980 | Gharana Donga | Padma | |
| 1980 | Superman | | |
| 1980 | Challenge Ramudu | Prema | |
| 1980 | Kodalu Vastunaru Jagratha | | |
| 1981 | Addala Meda | | |
| 1981 | Kondaveeti Simham | Ravi's wife | |
| 1981 | Jagamondi | Rani | |
| 1981 | Todu Dongalu | Jaya | |
| 1981 | Alludugaru Zindabad | | |
| 1981 | Naa Mogudu Brahmachari | | |
| 1982 | Kodallu Vastunnaru Jagratha | | |
| 1982 | Maro Malupu | | |
| 1982 | Patnam Vachina Pativrathalu | Sridevi | |
| 1982 | Tingu Rangadu | Radha | |
| 1982 | Vamsa Gouravam | Rekha | |
| 1982 | Kalavari Samsaram | Vasanthi | |
| 1982 | Bangaru Bhoomi | Rekha | |
| 1982 | Maro Malupu | | |
| 1983 | Sagara Sangamam | Dancer | Dubbed into Tamil as Salangai Oli and Malayalam with the same name |
| 1983 | Idi Kaadu Mugimpu | Law student | |
| 1983 | Moodu Mullu | Geetha | |
| 1983 | Prema Pichollu | | |
| 1983 | Ooha Sundari | Radha | |
| 1984 | Allullostunnaru | | |
| 1984 | Rojulu Marayi | | |
| 1984 | E Chaduvulu Makoddu | | |
| 1989 | Black Tiger | | |
| 1990 | Balachandrudu | Sujatha | |
| 1990 | Kokila | | |
| 1992 | Aapadbandhavudu | Lalitha | |
| 1992 | Aswamedham | Lakshmi | |
| 1993 | Nippu Ravva | Lawyer Gayatri | |
| 1993 | Varasudu | Vinay's mother | |
| 1993 | Kalachakram | | |
| 1996 | Drohi | | |
| 1996 | Rendu Kutumbala Katha | Hema's mother | |
| 1997 | Thodu | | |
| 1998 | Gamyam | Vadinalu | |
| 2003 | Johnny | Johnny's mother | |
| 2003 | Okkadu | Vasundhara | |
| 2005 | Nuvvostanante Nenoddantana | Janaki | |
| 2006 | Pournami | Shiva's Mother | |
| 2008 | Kathanayakudu | Headmistress | |
| 2008 | King | King's mother | Dubbed into Malayalam with same name. |
| 2009 | Pistha | Muralikrishna's mother | |
| 2012 | Racha | Bellary's wife | |
| 2012 | Tuneega Tuneega | Ravindra Babu's sister | |
| 2013 | Shadow | Lakshmi | |
| 2015 | Lion | Bose's mother | |
| 2018 | Manasuku Nachindi | | |
| 2019 | Venky Mama | Lakshmi | |

=== Kannada ===
| Year | Film | Role | Notes |
|---|---|---|---|
| 1981 | Garjane | | |
| 1981 | Hennina Sedu | | Dual role; Simultaneously made in Telugu as Chalaki Chellamma; Dubbed in Tamil as Kalyanam Aanavare Soukyama |
| 1984 | Hennina Sowbhagya | Mangala | |
| 1984 | Aasha Kirana | Suma | |
| 1984 | Devathe | | |
| 1984 | Eradu Rekhegalu | | |
| 1984 | Ramapurada Ravana | Radha | |
| 1984 | Aaradhane | | |
| 1984 | Prachanda Kulla | Goddess Parvati | Special appearance |
| 1985 | Devarelliddaane | | |
| 1985 | Mamatheya Madilu | Sunitha | |
| 1985 | Goonda Guru | | |
| 1985 | Giri Baale | Shankari | |
| 1985 | Dhruva Thare | Sudha | |
| 1985 | Mareyada Manikya | Gowri | |
| 1985 | Veeradhi Veera | | |
| 1986 | Madhura Bandhavya | | |
| 1986 | Aruna Raaga | Janaki | Karnataka State Film Award for Best Actress |
| 1986 | Mrugaalaya | | |
| 1986 | Vishwaroopa | | |
| 1986 | Anuraga Aralithu | Uma | |
| 1986 | Nenapina Doni | | |
| 1987 | Hrudaya Pallavi | | |
| 1987 | Bazaar Bheema | | |
| 1987 | Inspector Kranthikumar | | |
| 1987 | Aase | | |
| 1987 | Anthima Theerpu | | |
| 1987 | Shruthi Seridaaga | Kamala | Filmfare Award for Best Actress - Kannada |
| 1988 | Devatha Manushya | Jaya | |
| 1988 | Daada | Lakshmi | |
| 1988 | Arjun | | |
| 1988 | Mithileya Seetheyaru | Vanitha | |
| 1988 | Ramanna Shamanna | | |
| 1988 | Gudugu Sidilu | | |
| 1988 | Shiva Mecchida Kannappa | Goddess Parvati | Special appearance |
| 1989 | Aananthara | | |
| 1989 | Jackey | | |
| 1989 | Madhuri | | |
| 1990 | Samsara Nauke | Seetha | |
| 1990 | Aavesha | | |
| 1990 | Sabarimala Swami Ayyappa | | |
| 1990 | Prathama Ushakirana | | |
| 1990 | Nigooda Rahasya | Deepa/Roopa | Dual role |
| 1991 | Naagini | | |
| 1992 | Harakeya Kuri | Rosie | |
| 1993 | Aakasmika | Indira | |
| 1993 | Sangharsha | Poornima | |
| 1994 | Chinna Nee Naguthiru | | |
| 1996 | Jenina Hole | | |
| 1996 | Gaaya | | |
| 1997 | Zindabad | | |
| 1997 | Vimochane | | |
| 2004 | Poorvapara | Sharade | |
| 2005 | O Priyathama | Sowbhagya | |
| 2006 | Miss California | Shakuntala | |
| 2010 | Mr. Theertha | Annapoorna | |
| 2013 | Brindavana | | |
| 2015 | Shivam | | |
| 2017 | Halli Panchayathi | | |
| 2017 | Meenakshi | | |
| 2017 | March 22 | | |
| 2017 | Vyaghra | | |
| 2019 | 10ne Tharagathi | | |
| 2026 | Mother Promise | Ryandi's mother | |

=== Tamil ===
| Year | Film | Role | Notes |
|---|---|---|---|
| 1978 | Bairavi | Bairavi | |
| 1979 | Ninaithale Inikkum | Meena | |
| 1979 | Mayandi | | |
| 1980 | Dharma Raja | | |
| 1981 | Garjanai | Rekha | |
| 1982 | Thyagi | | |
| 1982 | Kadhalithu Paar | | |
| 1982 | Katrukenna Veli | | |
| 1982 | Pannaipurathu Pandavargal | | |
| 1983 | Nenjamellam Neeye | | |
| 1983 | Sumangali | | |
| 1983 | Muthu Engal Sothu | Roopa | |
| 1987 | Kadamai Kanniyam Kattupaadu | Seetha | |
| 1988 | Kaliyugam | Lalitha | |
| 1988 | Oomai Thurai | Geetha | |
| 1988 | En Vazhi Thani Vazhi | Raguvaran's Sister | |
| 1989 | Pudhu Pudhu Arthangal | Gowri | |
| 1990 | Keladi Kannmanii | SP Balasubramayam's wife | |
| 1990 | Salem Vishnu | Lakshmi | |
| 1990 | Urudhi Mozhi | Jaya | |
| 1991 | Thayamma | Kalyani | |
| 1991 | Vigneshwar | Padma | |
| 1991 | Thalapathi | Selvi | Dubbed into Telugu and Hindi as Dalapathi |
| 1991 | Azhagan | Kanmani | |
| 1992 | Mr. Prasad | | |
| 1993 | Mutrugai | Saradha | |
| 1993 | Dharma Seelan | Parvathy | |
| 1993 | Poy Mugham | Priya | |
| 1994 | Uzhiyan | District collector | |
| 1995 | Kuruthipunal | Zeenath | |
| 1996 | Vetri Vinayagar | Priyamala | |
| 1996 | Kalki | Chellamma | |
| 1997 | Abhimanyu | Kausalya and Ranjitha | |
| 1998 | Kaadhale Nimmadhi | | |
| 1998 | Kizhakkum Merkkum | Thillai | |
| 1998 | Jeans | Meiyaththa | |
| 2005 | Sivakasi | Muthappa's mother | |
| 2006 | Unakkum Enakkum | Parvathi | |
| 2007 | Aalwar | Shiva's mother | |
| 2007 | Azhagiya Tamil Magan | Guru's mother | |
| 2008 | Santosh Subramaniam | Lakshmi | |
| 2008 | Kuselan | Headmistress | |
| 2009 | Thoranai | Murugan's mother | |
| 2009 | Villu | Shaan's wife | |
| 2010 | Ithu Kadhal Uthirum Kaalam | | |
| 2011 | 180 | Jayam | |
| 2013 | Mathapoo | Pooja's mother | |
| 2015 | Paranjothi | | |

=== Hindi ===
| Year | Film | Role | Notes |
|---|---|---|---|
| 1983 | Shubh Kaamna | Nurse | |
| 1984 | Yeh Desh | Pani | |
| 1992 | Aaj Ka Goonda Raaj | Ritu | |

=== Tulu ===
| Year | Film | Role | Notes |
|---|---|---|---|
| 1994 | September 8 | | |

== Television ==
| Year | Serial/Show | Role | Channel | Language |
|---|---|---|---|---|
| 2024-2025 | Pavithra | Ramadevi | Kalaignar TV | Tamil |
| 2024 | Vatsalyam | Chembakamangalath Rohini | Zee Keralam | Malayalam |
| 2023 | Star Magic | Mentor | Flowers TV | Malayalam |
| 2023 | Parvathy | Lalitha Devi | Zee Keralam | Malayalam |
| 2018 | Thene Manasulu | Sudeshna Devi | ETV Telugu | Telugu |
| 2016-2018 | Bathuku Jataka Bandi | Host | Zee Telugu | Telugu |
| 2015-2016 | Sthreethvam | Susanna Mathews | Surya TV | Malayalam |
| 2012-2015 | Rajakumari | Lakshmi Magalingam | Sun TV | Tamil |
| 2005 | Engirindho Vanthaal | Kousalya | Jaya TV | Tamil |
| 2002-2003 | American Dreams | Seetha | Asianet | Malayalam |
| 2001-2003 | Anni | Saradha | Jaya TV | Tamil |
| 1999 | Katha Kathayaam Karanamaam | | Vijay TV | Tamil |
| 1996-1998 | Kadhal Pagadai | Girija | Sun TV | Tamil |
| 1995 | Oppanai | Girija | Sun TV | Tamil |
| 1995 | Kuthirakal | | Doordarshan | Malayalam |
| 1994 | Kaialavu Manasu | Saradha | Doordarshan | Tamil |
| 1991 | Penn- Appa Irukken | Sudha | Madras Doordarshan | Tamil |

== Awards ==
Karnataka State Film Awards

- Karnataka State Film Award for Best Actress - Aruna Raaga (1986)

Kerala State Film Awards

- 1989 - Second Best Actress - Oru Vadakkan Veeragadha

Filmfare Awards South

- Filmfare Award for Best Actress - Kannada - Shruthi Seridaaga
- Filmfare Award for Best Actress – Malayalam - Aadhaaram

Cinema Express Awards

- 1988 : Best Actress – Malayalam - Vaishalii
