= M. Ranga Rao =

Indian music composer

Background information
- Born: 26 April 1932; Andhra Pradesh
- Died: 3 August 1990 (aged 57) Bangalore, Karnataka
- Genres: Film score, Theatre
- Occupations: Composer, music director, instrumentalist

M. Ranga Rao (26 April 1932 – 3 August 1990) was a prominent Indian composer who predominantly worked in Kannada cinema. Rao was known for his mellifluous scores and lilting tunes backed with strong classical nuances. Rao composed tunes for approximately 100 films in Kannada cinema.

== Personal life ==
=== Early life ===
Ranga Rao was born in Kakinada, Andhra Pradesh on 15 October 1932. He learnt the art of playing the veena at a very young age. His inspiration was his mother, Alamelu Thangamma. He graduated with Diploma in Mechanical Engineering stream.

=== Family ===
Ranga Rao was married to Syamala Devi and they have two sons and two daughters. His wife, Syamala, died in 1991, five months after his death.

== Career ==
Rao entered the film industry as a small-time actor in the films Swarga Seema (1945) and Yogi Vemana (1947). He worked a Veena player in the 1946 released film Tyagayya.

However, he entered the Kannada film industry as a full-fledged composer of the film Nakkare Ade Swarga in 1967. This also marked the beginning of the legendary playback singer S. P. Balasubrahmanyam. He had a long association with noted singer Bangalore Latha.

Ranga Rao introduced Balasubramanyam to Kannada films by offering him a duet song alongside the veteran singer P. Susheela. Ranga Rao also worked as an assistant music director to veteran ace musician P. Adinarayana Rao.

Along with composing numerous songs in Kannada, he also composed a few in Telugu, Tamil and Malayalam languages, most of them being the dubbed works of his Kannada songs.

== Death ==
Ranga Rao died of cancer on 2 August 1990, aged 58. He was cremated in a crematorium in Bengaluru. He and his wife are survived by their four children, children-in-law and grandchildren.

== Awards ==
- 1969 – Karnataka State Film Award for Best Music Director – Hannele Chiguridaga
- 1982 – Karnataka State Film Award for Best Music Director – Hosa Belaku
- 1984 – Karnataka State Film Award for Best Music Director – Bandhana

== Discography ==
Kannada

Year	Film	Notes
1967	Nakkare Ade Swarga	
1967	Manassiddare Marga	
1968	Hannele Chiguridaga	Won - Karnataka State Film Award for Best Music Director
1969	Margadarshi	
1969	Gruhalakshmi	
1970	Karulina Kare	
1970	Sukha Samsara	
1971	Sakshatkara	
1971	Namma Samsara	
1971	Sothu Geddavalu	
1972	Janma Rahasya	
1972	Utthara Dakshina	
1973	Bidugade	
1973	Edakallu Guddada Mele	
1974	Gruhini	
1974	Maga Mommaga	
1974	Bhale Bhatta	
1975	Mane Belaku	
1975	Kaveri	
1975	Viplava Vanithe	
1976	Devaru Kotta Vara	
1976	Hudugaatada Hudugi	
1976	Baduku Bangaravayitu	
1976	Punardhatta	
1976	Bahaddur Gandu	
1976	Badavara Bandhu	
1976	Kanasu Nanasu	
1977	Dhanalakshmi	
1977	Geddavalu Naane	
1977	Punarmilana	
1977	Shani Prabhava	
1977	Shubhashaya	
1978	Halli Haida	
1978	Anubandha	
1978	Sridevi	
1979	Aliya Devaru	
1979	Atthege Thakka Sose	
1980	Shree Raghavendra Karune	
1980	Vasantha Geetha	
1980	Prema Jwala	
1980	Pattanakke Banda Pathniyaru	
1981	Mane Madadi Makkalu	
1981	Ranganayaki	
1981	Naga Kala Bhairava	
1981	Number Aidu Ekka	
1982	Kempu Hori	
1982	Hosa Belaku	Won - Karnataka State Film Award for Best Music Director
1982	Swarna Mahal Rahasya	
1982	Guna Nodi Hennu Kodu	
1982	Kalasapurada Hudugaru	
1982	Kannu Theresida Hennu	
1982	Raga Thala	
1982	Raja Maharaja	
1983	Kaviratna Kalidasa	
1983	Kalluveene Nudiyithu	
1983	Swargadalli Maduve	
1983	Naavu Yarigenu Kadime	
1983	Kranthiyogi Basavanna	
1983	Mududida Tavare Aralithu	
1983	Samarpane	
1984	Samayada Gombe	
1984	Aparanji	
1984	Rudranaga	
1984	Shravana Banthu	
1984	Premave Balina Belaku	
1984	Benki Birugali	
1984	Bandhana	Won - Karnataka State Film Award for Best Music Director
1984	Bedaru Bombe	
1984	Avala Antharanga	
1984	Olave Baduku	
1984	Bilee Gulabi	
1985	Goonda Guru	
1985	Aahuti	
1985	Veeradhi Veera	
1985	Jwaalamukhi	
1985	Pithamaha	
1985	Kumkuma Thanda Soubhagya	
1985	Bhayankara Bhasmasura	
1985	Hendthi Beku Hendthi	
1986	Madhura Bandhavya	
1986	Karna	
1986	Hennina Koogu	
1986	Kathanayaka	
1986	Nannavaru	
1986	Prema Jaala	
1986	Mouna Geethe	
1986	Aruna Raaga	
1986	Maneye Manthralaya	
1987	Olavina Udugore	
1987	Shiva Bhakta Markandeya	
1987	Mullalu Ondu Mallige	
1987	Shubha Milana	
1987	Kurukshetra	
1987	Thayi Kotta Thali	
1987	Hrudaya Pallavi	
1987	Vijay	
1988	Shanthi Nivasa	
1988	Olavina Aasare	
1988	Oorigitta Kolli	
1988	Mutthaide	
1989	Bidisada Bandha	
1989	Bisilu Beladingalu	
1989	Thayigobba Tharle Maga	
1989	Samsara Nouke	
1989	Rajasimha	
1989	Abhimana	
1990	Prema Tharanga	
1990	Nambidre Nambi Bitre Bidi	
1990	Sri Satyanarayana Pooja Phala	
1990	Golmaal Radhakrishna	
1990	Ramarajyadalli Rakshasaru	
1990	Policena Hendthi	
1990	Halliya Surasuraru	
1991	Sri Nanjundeshwara Mahime	
1991	Varagala Bete	
1991	Giri Mallige	
1991	Antharangada Mrudanga	
1991	Kaala Chakra	
1993	Khaidi No.407	
1993	Prana Snehitha	
1996	Manasa Veene	

Telugu

- Sardar Dharmanna (1987)

Tamil

- Kudumbam Oru Koyil (1986)

== See also ==
- M. Ranga Rao on Saregama
- M. Ranga Rao on Apple Music
