= List of Kannada films of 1979 =

== Top-grossing films ==
Rank	Title	Collection	Ref.
1.	Huliya Haalina Mevu	₹2.5 crore (₹62.13 crore in 2025)	
2.	Chandanada Gombe	₹2 crore (₹50 crore in 2025)	
3.	Nanobba Kalla	₹1.5 crore (₹37.5 crore in 2025)	
4.	Naa Ninna Bidalaare	₹1.25 crore (₹32 crore in 2025)	
5.	Seetharamu	₹1 crore (₹25 crore in 2025)	

== List ==
The following is a list of films produced in the Kannada film industry in India in 1979, presented in alphabetical order.

Title	Director	Cast	Music
Adalu Badalu	C. V. Rajendran	Srinath, Aarathi, Dwarakish, M. P. Shankar	Vijaya Bhaskar
Akramana	Girish Kasaravalli	Vijay Kashi, Vaishali Kasaravalli, Padmashree, Chandrakumar Jain	B. V. Karanth
Aliya Devaru	C. V. Rajendran	Srinath, Manjula, Dwarakish, Chandrashekhar	M. Ranga Rao
Arivu	Katte Ramachandra	Sampaturu Shivaram, N. Madhusudhan, P. N. Vijayakumar	B. V. Karanth
Asadhya Aliya	H. R. Bhargava	Vishnuvardhan, Padmapriya, Maanu, Dwarakish	G. K. Venkatesh
Atthege Thakka Sose	Y. R. Swamy	Leelavathi, Maanu, Rekha Rao, Gangadhar	M. Ranga Rao
Balina Guri	K. S. Prakash Rao	Srinivasa Murthy, Jayanthi, Balakrishna	Chakravarthy
Bhoolokadalli Yamaraja	Siddalingaiah	Lokesh, M. P. Shankar, Jai Jagadish, Anjali, Vijayalalitha, Lokanath	C. Ashwath
Chandanada Gombe	Dorai-Bhagavan	Ananth Nag, Lakshmi, Lokesh, Uma Shivakumar, K. S. Ashwath	Rajan–Nagendra
Daaha	D. V. Krishnamurthy	Lokesh, Girija Lokesh, Vijayakumar	Ramlal Sehra
Dange Edda Makkalu	Vadiraj	Srikanth, Shashikumar, M. V. Vasudeva Rao, Harish, Baby Anuradha	Vijaya Bhaskar
Dharmasere	Puttanna Kanagal	Srinath, Aarathi, Sathyapriya	Upendra Kumar
Dombara Krishna	HMK Murthy	Master Suresh, Baby Indira, Kumari Indu, Baby Leelavathi	Ramlal Sehra
Ene Barali Preethi Irali	P. N. Srinivas	P. N. Srinivas, Manjula, Lokanath, P. Krishnaraj, Jayalakshmi	Ashwath-Vaidi
Huliya Haalina Mevu	Vijay	Rajkumar, Jaya Pradha, Jayachitra, M. P. Shankar	G. K. Venkatesh
I Love You	Vaayu Nandana Rao	Shankar Nag, Suvarna, Mamatha Shenoy, Srinivasa Murthy, Seetharam	Satyam
Kaadu Kudure	Chandrashekhara Kambara	Maanu, Sundarashri, Maithili, Shashikala, Swarnamma	Chandrashekhara Kambara
Kamala	C. V. Rajendran	Ambareesh, Lokesh, Roopa Devi, Ramakrishna	G. K. Venkatesh
Khandavideko Mamsavideko	P. Lankesh	Suresh Heblikar, Jayamala, Roopa, Kantharaj	Rajeev Taranath
Madhu Chandra	Ramesh - Shivaram	Shankar Nag, Jayamala, Ramakrishna, Mamatha Shenoy	T. G. Lingappa
Mallige Sampige	K. Mani Murugan	Lokesh, Jayanthi, Ashok, Manjula	Vijaya Bhaskar
Mangala	M N Prasad; N T Jayaram Reddy	Leelavathi, Ramgopal, Dinesh, Dheerendra Gopal	Upendra Kumar
Manini	K. S. Sethumadhavan	Lokesh, Aarathi, Bharathi, Vishnuvardhan	K. V. Mahadevan
Maralu Sarapani	K. V. Jayaram	Ashok, Padmapriya, Sundar Krishna Urs, Sundar Raj, Musuri Krishnamurthy	Rajan–Nagendra
Mutthu Ondu Mutthu	R. N. Jayagopal	Ananth Nag, Roopa Chakravarthy, Sundar Krishna Urs	G. K. Venkatesh
Muyyi	M Lakshminarayan	Lokesh, K. S. Ashwath, Bhargavi Narayan, Mukhyamantri Chandru	Vijaya Bhaskar
Naa Ninna Bidalaare	Vijay	Ananth Nag, Lakshmi, K. Vijaya, Leelavathi, K. S. Ashwath	Rajan–Nagendra
Naniruvude Ninagagi	A. V. Sheshagiri Rao	Vishnuvardhan, Aarathi, Balakrishna, Dwarakish	Rajan–Nagendra
Nanobba Kalla	Dorai-Bhagavan	Rajkumar, Lakshmi, Kanchana, Thoogudeepa Srinivas, Tiger Prabhakar	Rajan–Nagendra
Nentaro Gantu Kallaro	A. V. Sheshagiri Rao	Vishnuvardhan, Aarathi, Balakrishna	G. K. Venkatesh
Pakka Kalla	Y. R. Swamy	Srinath, Ambareesh, Manjula, Tiger Prabhakar	Satyam
Preethi Madu Thamashe Nodu	C. V. Rajendran	Srinath, Shankar Nag, Manjula, Padmapriya, Dwarakish	Rajan–Nagendra
Putani Agent 123	Geethapriya	Master Ramakrishna Hegde, Baby Indira, Master Bhanuprakash, Srinath, Manjula, Ambareesh, Udaya Kumar, Shakthi Prasad, Sundar Krishna Urs	Rajan–Nagendra
Savathiya Neralu	Y. R. Swamy	Srinath, Manjula, Ambareesh, Leelavathi	Satyam
Savithri	T. S. Ranga	Somashekar Rao, Anil Thakkar, Ashwini, Vasantha Kumar	Guna Singh
Seetharamu	V. Somashekar	Shankar Nag, Manjula, Rajanand	Satyam
Udugore	Mahesha Swamy	Kalyan Kumar, Udaya Chandrika, Shakthi Prasad	Chandrashekhara Kambara
Urvashi Neene Nanna Preyasi	C. V. Sridhar	Srinath, Dwarakish, Ramakrishna, Shivaram	Ilaiyaraaja
Vijay Vikram	V. Somashekar	Vishnuvardhan, Jayanthi, Deepa, Pramila Joshai	Satyam

== See also ==
- Kannada films of 1978
- Kannada films of 1995
