= Shanmukha =

Shanmukha may refer to:

- Shanmukha (lit. 'six-faced'), an alternate name for Kartikeya, the Hindu god of war
- Shanmukha (film), 2025 Indian Telugu-language crime thriller film
- Shanmukha Priya Indian singer
- Samavedam Shanmukha Sarma Indian spiritual teacher
- Shanmukha Srinivas Indian actor
- Shanmukha Films Indian film production and distribution company
