= Stuvartpuram Dongalu =

Indian Telugu-language action drama film

- Directed by: Sagar
- Written by: Satya Murthy (dialogues)
- Screenplay by: Sagar
- Produced by: V.S. Ramireddy; V. Veera Reddy
- Starring: Bhanu Chander; Lissy; Easwari Rao; Daggubati Raja
- Cinematography: S. Gopal Reddy
- Edited by: Gowtham Raju
- Music by: Raj-Koti
- Production company: Sambasiva Art Productions
- Release date: 3 January 1991
- Country: India
- Language: Telugu

Stuvartpuram Dongalu (transl. Thieves of Stuartpuram) is a 1991 Indian Telugu-language action drama film directed by Sagar and starring Bhanu Chander, Lissy, Easwari Rao and Daggubati Raja.

== Plot ==
A father alongside his partners and son go out to steal; however, his father is betrayed by his allies in crime. His son takes revenge on his father's partners.

== Cast ==
- Bhanu Chander
- Lissy
- Easwari Rao as Padmini IAS
- Daggubati Raja as Viji
- Nassar as SP Shankar
- Charan Raj
- Dharmavarapu Subramanyam
- Babu Mohan
- Suthi Velu as Padmini's father
- Vallabhaneni Janardhan
- Narsing Yadav
- Bangalore Padma

== Release and reception ==
The film was released a week before Stuartpuram Police Station (1991) starring Chiranjeevi and was a success giving director Sagar a break.

In the director's obituary, a writer from News18 noted "The power-packed storyline and iconic performances by the cast were some of the integral elements which led to the success of this film".
