= Hedathale =

- village
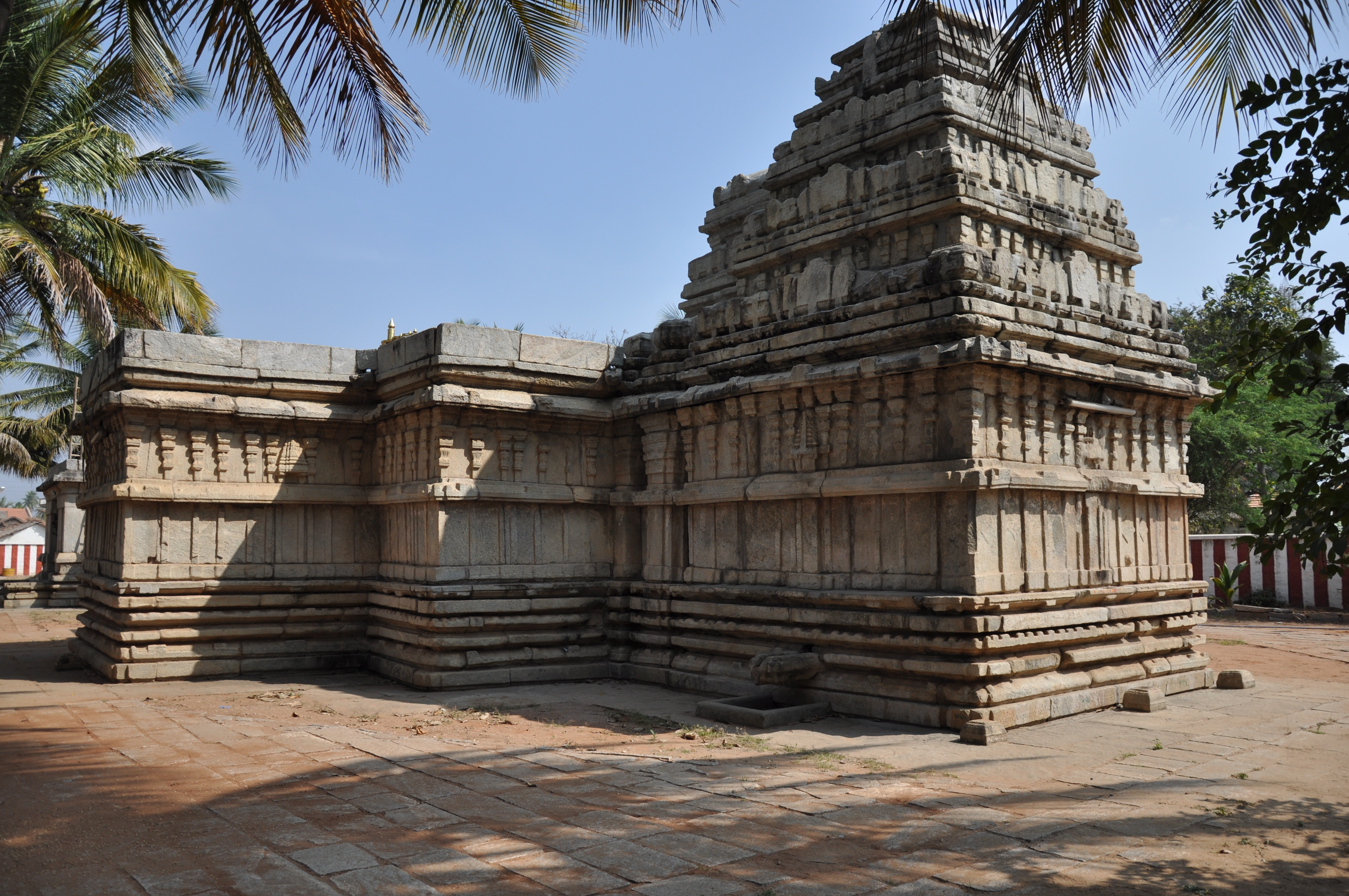
- Lakshmikantha Swami temple
- Country: India
- State: Karnataka
- District: Mysore
- Talukas: Nanjangud

Government
  - Body: Gram panchayat

Area
  - Total: 10.73 km^{2} (4.14 sq mi)

Population (2011)
  - Total: 6,449
  - Density: 601.0/km^{2} (1,557/sq mi)

Languages
  - Official: Kannada
- Time zone: UTC+5:30 (IST)
- ISO 3166 code: IN-KA
- Vehicle registration: KA
- Website: karnataka.gov.in

Hedathale is a village in the southern state of Karnataka, India. It is located in the Nanjangud taluk of Mysore district in Karnataka. It is a divine and unique Hindu religious centre.

Hedathale is also spelled 'Yedathale' and means the “left head”.

Hedathale village is famous for the Hoysala temple, called the Lakshmikantha Swami temple which was built by the rulers of the Hoysala Kingdom in the year 1187 AD and has three cellas called the Thrikutachala. The principal deity in the temple is Lakshmikantha but it also houses shrines dedicated to Lakshmi Narasimha Swamy and Venugopala Swamy. Within the premises of the temple there is a particular 16-faced hall called 'Hadinaru Mukha Chavadi’ of a unique architecture built by a palegara (local chieftain). The temeple complex oozes tranquillity and architectural splendour.

== Geography ==
Hedathale village is in the southern state of Karnataka, India. Its geographical area is 1,073.19 hectares (2,651.9 acres). It is located in the Nanjangud taluk of Mysore district in Karnataka.

== Demographics ==
As of 2011 India census, Hedathale had a population of 6,449 with 3,169 males and 3,280 females, males and 2889 females in about 1,562 houses, as per Population Census 2011. Of the total population of the village, Schedule Tribe (ST) constituted 53.11 % while Schedule Caste (SC) accounted for 14.96 %.

== Lakshmikantha Swami temple ==
The Hedathale village is well known for the Lakshmikantha Swami (literally the Lord of Lakshmi) temple situated at the centre of the village which was built which was built in 1187 AD by the then ruler of the Hoysala Kingdom King Veera Ballala II (r. 1173–1220 CE), the most notable monarch of the Hoysala Empire. Its uniqueness lies in its triad of shrines or the sanctum sanctorum, called the Thrikutachala. The principal deity in the temple is Lakshmikantha in the main central shrine. The same temple also houses the shrines dedicated to Lakshmi Narasimha Swamy and Venugopala Swamy in the other two cellas of the thrikutachala style chambers. It is a masterpiece of Hoysala architecture which has a central atrium called the'Hadinaru Mukha Chavadi’ (16 faced-hall) built by a local palegara (local chieftain).

The legend related to the 16 faced-hall reflects the customs of those times that prohibited the mother-in-law to seeing her son-in-law and he could also not see her. Conforming to this custom, particularly in a temple, the local palegara (local chieftain) named Bhimanna Dhanda Nayaka, built this hall; in front of the sanctum sanctorum of the temple so that his 16 daughters and their husbands could be seated along with his wife, and the palegar could see all his 16 daughters. However, their husbands, who also sat in the same hall could not be seen from where the palegar's wife sat. From the built lay out of the hall only the 16 daughters could be seen but the sons-in-law were veiled by the pillars of the hall or chavadi.

Another mystic aspect observed in this temple relates to a subshrine where Andal, the only female saint among the 12 Alvar saints of South India, is worshipped. The eyes of the idol or vigraha of Andal deified here surprisingly get lit up as if looking at the devotee as soon as the priest shows the aarti lamp light to the face of the image.

== Access ==
Hedathale is about 40 kilometres (25 mi) from Mysuru city, its district headquarters, and about 15 kilometres (9.3 mi) from Nanjanagud, the taluk headquarters.

== Other temples ==
Apart from this temple there are other temples in Hedathale like the Maramma temple and a Shiva temple.

== See also ==
- Mysore
- Districts of Karnataka
