= Surya IPS =

- Theatrical release poster
- Directed by: A. Kodandarami Reddy
- Written by: Paruchuri Brothers
- Screenplay by: A. Kodandarami Reddy
- Produced by: T. Subbarami Reddy
- Starring: Venkatesh; Vijayshanti
- Cinematography: P. S. Prakash
- Edited by: Trinath
- Music by: Ilaiyaraaja
- Production company: Maheswari Parameswari Productions
- Release date: 5 September 1991
- Running time: 144 mins
- Country: India
- Language: Telugu

Surya IPS is a 1991 Telugu-language action crime film produced by T. Subbarami Reddy under the Maheswari Parameswari Productions banner and directed by A. Kodandarami Reddy. Venkatesh and Vijayashanti played the lead roles, and the music was composed by Ilaiyaraaja. The film was recorded as Average at the box office. It was later dubbed in Tamil as Mudhalamaichar Jayanthi.

== Plot ==
Surya (Venkatesh) is a carefree, irreponsible young man. His grandfather (Satyanarayana) forces him to join the police force. Sirisha (Vijayashanti), Surya's college mate is also selected as a police cadet. After various quarrels between them and misbehavior of Surya, his grandfather narrates Surya his reason behind making him a police officer. During Surya's childhood, his father Jagadeswara Rao (Charanraj) killed his mother to marry C.M. Ekambareswara Rao's (Gokina Rama Rao) sister and framed his own father for it. Once this is revealed, Surya decides to take revenge, completes his training and becomes a police officer. Meanwhile, Rajeswara Rao (Charuhasan), Sirisha's father contests election against C.M. Jagadeswara Rao. He murders Rajeswara Rao & his entire family and Surya takes up the case, but Jagadeswara Rao and C.M.'s tactics make Surya land in jail, which forms the rest of story.

== Cast ==
- Venkatesh as Surya, an IPS officer
- Vijayshanti as Sirisha
- Satyanayana as Surya's grandfather
- Nutan Prasad as Ranganayakulu
- Sarath Kumar as Pruthvi Raj
- Charanraj as Jagadeswara Rao
- Charuhasan as Rajeswara Rao
- Rallapalli as P.A.
- Vallabhaneni Janardhan as Jailor
- Gokina Rama Rao as C.M. Ekambareswara Rao
- Kota Shankar Rao as Commissioner
- Narayana Rao as Sirisha's brother-in-law
- Bhimeswara Rao as Judge
- Jyothi as Parvathi
- Sudha Rani as Savitri
- Tatineni Rajeswari as P.A's wife
- Tarun as Surya's step brother

== Soundtrack ==
Surya IPS

Soundtrack album by Ilaiyaraaja
- Released: 1991
- Recorded: 1991
- Genre: Soundtrack
- Length: 24:42
- Label: LEO Audio
- Producer: Ilaiyaraaja

Ilaiyaraaja chronology
Coolie No. 1 (1991)	Surya IPS (1991)	Stuartpuram Police Station (1991)

Music composed by Ilaiyaraaja. Music released on LEO Audio company. The song "Veyyinokka Zillala" was remixed in the film Ravanasura (2023).

No.	Title	Lyrics	Singer(s)	Length
1.	"Om Namo Nama Yavvanama"	Sirivennela Seetharama Sastry	S. P. Balasubrahmanyam, Chitra	4:55
2.	"Hatthiree Ado Madiri"	C. Narayana Reddy	S. P. Balasubrahmanyam, Chitra	4:55
3.	"Nelaraja"	Sirivennela Seetharama Sastry	S. P. Balasubrahmanyam, Chitra	5:10
4.	"Jijinaka Jinkara"	Veturi	S. P. Balasubrahmanyam, S. Janaki	4:39
5.	"Veyyinnokka Zillala"	Sirivennela Seetharama Sastry	S. P. Balasubrahmanyam	4:56
Total length:				24:42
