= Weston Elwes =

Archdeacon of Madras (1893–1900)

William Weston Elwes (1845–1901) was an Anglican Archdeacon in India in the late 19th and early 20th centuries.

Elwes was born in Lexden and educated at Ipswich School. He graduated from Trinity College, Cambridge in 1867; and was ordained in 1868. After a curacy in Tunbridge Wells he went as a Chaplain to Madras. He served at Vizagapatam, Trichinopoly, Coimbatore and Ootacamund. He was Archdeacon of Madras from 1893 to 1900.

He died on 22 May 1901: his son Frederick Fenn Elwes, was Principal of the Medical College, Madras.
