= Sididedda Sahodara =

- Directed by: Joe Simon
- Written by: Nagabhushan (dialogues)
- Screenplay by: Joe Simon
- Story by: Baliga Brothers
- Produced by: B. P. Baliga; B. S. Baliga; B. M. Baliga
- Starring: Vishnuvardhan; Tiger Prabhakar; Aarathi; Jayamala
- Cinematography: Kulashekhar
- Edited by: Umashankar Babu
- Music by: Satyam
- Production company: Sri Rajarajeshwari Productions
- Distributed by: Sri Rajarajeshwari Productions
- Release date: 15 July 1983
- Running time: 136 minutes
- Country: India
- Language: Kannada

Sididedda Sahodara is a 1983 Kannada film directed by Joe Simon and produced by B. P. Baliga, B. S. Baliga and B. M. Baliga. The film stars Vishnuvardhan in double role with Tiger Prabhakar, Aarathi and Jayamala in other lead roles. The action-romantic comedy was a big hit and the songs were also popular.

== Cast ==
- Vishnuvardhan as Dileep and Pradeep
- Tiger Prabhakar as Jagga
- Aarathi as Latha
- Jayamala as Geetha
- Leelavathi as Shantha
- Dinesh as Sadashiva
- Musuri Krishnamurthy as Kitty
- Dheerendra Gopal as Ethiraj
- Sudheer
- Chethan Ramarao in Guest Appearance
- Sadashiva Brahmavar in Guest Appearance
- K. V. Manjaiah in Guest Appearance
- Kulashekar
- Comedian Guggu
- Lakshman
- Master Sanjay
- Master Narendra
- Shanthamma
- Girija

== Soundtrack ==
The music was composed by Satyam.

No.	Song	Singers	Lyrics	Length (m:ss)
1	Nanna Sama Yarilla	S. Janaki, S. P. Balasubrahmanyam	R. N. Jayagopal	04:22
2	Beda Annuvarunte	S. Janaki, Vishnuvardhan	Chi. Udaya Shankar	04:33
3	Hareyavu Karedide	S. Janaki, S. P. Balasubrahmanyam, Vani Jairam	R. N. Jayagopal	04:35
4	O Najuku Nalle	S. P. Balasubrahmanyam	Geethapriya	04:33
5	Duddu Idre	S. P. Balasubrahmanyam	Geethapriya	04:30
