= Vincent Shortland =

Archdeacon of Madras (1847–1859)

Vincent Shortland (10 May 1803 in Oxfordshire – 6 November 1880 in St Helier) was an Anglican archdeacon in India in the mid-19th century.

Shortland was educated at Winchester College and St Catharine's College, Cambridge and ordained in 1832. He went as a chaplain to the East India Company; and served at Trichinopoly, Bellary, Bangalore, Quilon, and Madras- where he was archdeacon from 1847 to 1859.
