= Ondu Premada Kathe =

- Directed by: S. M. Joe Simon
- Story by: B. R. Lakshman Rao
- Produced by: H. Ramesh; T. B. R. Shivaram; T. Ravi
- Starring: L. V. Sharada Rao; Maanu; Ashok
- Cinematography: Z. A. Khan
- Edited by: P. U. S. Maniyam
- Music by: T. G. Lingappa
- Distributed by: R. S. R. Combines
- Release date: 2 September 1977
- Country: India
- Language: Kannada

Ondu Premada Kathe ( transl. A story of love) is a 1977 Indian Kannada-language romantic drama film written by B. R. Lakshman Rao and directed by S. M. Joe Simon. This film is the first South Indian black and white CinemaScope. It stars L. V. Sharada Rao, Maanu and Ashok in the lead roles. Rao plays Lakshmi, the headmistress of a village school and Maanu as her husband is a teacher; Ashok as Chandrashekhar Rao plays a pivotal rolei. Rajinikanth appears in a supporting role as the chairman of the village panchayat.

== Cast ==
- L. V. Sharada as Lakshmi
- Ashok as Chandrashekhar
- Maanu as Kamalesh Nayar
- Rajinikanth as Chairman of the village panchayat
- Prema Karanth
- Ashalatha as Margaret
- Yashoda
- Katte Ramachandra
- Raju
- Venkataram
- Puttegowda

== Production ==
This was the first Prema Karanth Film L. V. Sharada acted in.
