= Onna Irukka Kaththukanum =

2026 Indian Tamil TV series

- Genre: Drama
- Screenplay by: Vetri; Dialogues: Senthilmohan Ponnaiah
- Directed by: I. David
- Starring: Stalin Muthu; Nirosha; Vasanth Vasi; Vaishnavi Sundar; Shankaresh Kumar; Syamantha Kiran; Mahesh Subramaniam; Ajith Kumar
- Theme music composer: Ilayavan
- Country of origin: India
- Original language: Tamil
- No. of seasons: 1
- No. of episodes: 100+

Production
- Executive producer: Kandhasaamy Saravanan
- Producer: Aran Hari
- Production locations: Chennai; Sivaganga
- Cinematography: Joe Martin
- Editor: S. Tamilselvan (Theni)
- Camera setup: Multi-Camera
- Running time: 22 minutes
- Production company: Spectraa Productions

Original release
- Network: Star Vijay
- Release: 29 June 2026 – present

Onna Irukka Kaththukanum (transl. We must learn to live together) is a 2026 Indian Tamil-language drama television series starring Stalin Muthu and Nirosha in the lead role, along with Vasanth Vasi, Vaishnavi Sundar, Shankaresh Kumar, Syamantha Kiran, Mahesh Subramaniam and Ajith Kumar in prominent roles. Produced by Aran Hari under the banner of Spectraa Productions, it premiered on Star Vijay on 29 June 2026 and is also available on the digital platform JioHotstar.

== Plot ==
The story follows orthodox patriarch Kandhasaamy, his wife Lakshmi, and their four sons, who run a traditional vegetarian mess. Their conservative lives are disrupted by the arrival of Indira, a progressive, independent woman who challenges the family's traditional values.

== Cast ==
=== Main ===
- Stalin Muthu as Kandhasaamy
  - VJ Kathirvel Kandasamy as Young Kandasaamy
- Nirosha as Lakshmi
  - Chaithra as Young Lakshmi
- Vasanth Vasi as Murugan
- Vaishnavi Sundar as Indhira
- Shankaresh Kumar as Kumaran
- Syamantha Kiran as Saraswathi "Sarasu"
- Mahesh Subramaniam as Shanmugam
- Priyanka as Abhirami "Abhi"
- Ajith Kumar as Karthikeyan

=== Recurring ===
- Saivam Ravi as Indhira's father
- Raj Mithran as Azhagappan: Abhi’s father
- KPY Pazhani

== Production ==
=== Development ===
Initially produced under the working title Lakshmi Mess, the series was produced by Aran Hari under the banner of Spectraa Productions. The first promo was released under the title Onna Irukka Kaththukkanum on 2 June 2026.

=== Casting ===
Nirosha and Stalin Muthu, who previously appeared as a married couple in Pandian Stores, are reuniting to play husband and wife—Kandasamy and Lakshmi in this show. Vaishnavi Sundar was cast as the female lead, Indhira, marking her return to television after her marriage, following her role in Ponni.

=== Release ===
The series was initially announced under the title Lakshmi Mess, but the title was subsequently changed to Onna Irukka Kaththukkanum. The series was scheduled to premiere on 29 June 2026 on Vijay Television, airing Monday through Friday at 6:30 p.m. IST. The series was also made available for streaming on JioHotstar following its television broadcast.
