= Anveshitha =

Telugu television series (1997–1999)

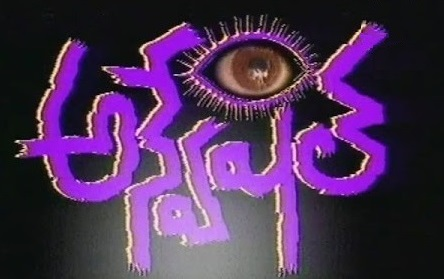
- Genre: Supernatural fiction; Drama; Horror; Mystery; Thriller
- Written by: Ilyas - Jyotsna
- Directed by: Ilyas Ahmed "Pradyumna"
- Starring: Achyuth; Yamuna
- Theme music composer: Madhavapeddi Suresh
- Opening theme: Anveshitha (sung by K.S. Chitra)
- Country of origin: India
- Original language: Telugu
- No. of episodes: 100

Production
- Producer: Ramoji Rao
- Running time: 18–24 minutes
- Production companies: Eenadu Television; Usha Kiran Movies

Original release
- Network: ETV Telugu
- Release: 27 August 1997 – 21 July 1999

Anveshitha is an Indian Telugu-language supernatural drama that aired on ETV from 1997 to 1999. Written by Ilyas Ahmed and Jyotsna, and directed by Ilyas Ahmed under the pseudonym Pradyumna, the series was produced by Ramoji Rao. It premiered on 27 August 1997 on the occasion of ETV's second anniversary and ran for 100 episodes till 21 July 1999.

Based on a paranormal novel by Ilyas Ahmed and Jyotsna, Anveshitha explored themes such as black magic, witchcraft, demonic possession, astral travel, and other supernatural phenomena. Blending elements of horror, fantasy, and mystery, the series was broadcast weekly on Wednesdays at 8:30 PM, with episodes ranging from 18 to 24 minutes in length.

The show became highly popular among Telugu audiences and received critical acclaim, winning eight Nandi Awards across various categories. It is regarded as a landmark in Telugu television for its innovative storytelling and supernatural themes.

== Plot ==
The story revolves around a young woman named Snigdha (Yamuna) who comes to live in Hyderabad after marrying her beau Pavan (Achyuth), an archaeologist, much to the disapproval of her mother-in-law. There, certain events lead her to discover an eerily desolated monument, inside which she encounters a strange witch-cult, whose members worship a bat-like demon named Karakinkara. Strangely, the place is visible only to Snigdha and when she recounts what she saw, everyone around her starts to think she is delusional, much to her chagrin. The statue of Karakinkara seems to haunt her wherever she goes and she starts experiencing terrifying nightmares. The terror-stricken woman spends sleepless nights, and spirals into depression with no one to believe her and a not-so-loving mother-in-law.

Meanwhile, a young woman named Masthanamma (Lakshmi) is hired as a household help by Snigdha's mother-in-law. Unbeknownst to anyone, Mastanamma, who practices witchcraft, captures a terrifying paranormal entity known as Khabees and holds him captive on the top of a wardrobe as her slave. She also falls in love with Pavan and so intends to get rid of Snigdha with the help of Khabees, who starts terrifying Snigdha from above the wardrobe.

Meanwhile, Snigdha gets pregnant much to the dislike of her mother-in-law. A series of events make Mastanamma realize her mistakes and she becomes friends with Snigdha. Eventually, Snigdha gives birth to a boy named Anirudh (Master Anil Raj), whom Mastanamma saves from the attack of the Karakinkara followers. But, soon after giving birth to Aniruddh, Snigdha dies in a fire accident and Mastanamma disappears without a trace. After the death of Snigdha, a grief-stricken Pavan raises Aniruddh on his own for 7 years, before uncovering hair-raising facts and shocking truths behind Snigdha's death.

The subsequent episodes delve into several intriguing questions: Is Snigdha truly dead? Did her mother-in-law play a role in her demise? What led to Mastanamma's sudden disappearance? What became of Khabees? Who are the Karakinkara followers, and why were they targeting Snigdha? How does young Anirudh attempt to connect with his deceased mother, and what drives him to believe in the paranormal? Additionally, the story introduces Professor Athma (Vallabhaneni Janardhan)—who is he, and what motivates his friendship with Anirudh?

The first 50 episodes focus on the challenges faced by Snigdha and Pavan, while the latter half shifts to a grown-up Anirudh (Shanmukha Srinivas). Anirudh develops extrasensory perception and begins recalling his past life with the guidance of a spirit guide named Clara (Suma Kanakala). New characters are introduced, including Bheesthi Nayak (Raja), the leader of the Karakinkara cult; Ankitha (Meena), Anirudh's best friend; and Aneela, his love interest. The storyline culminates in Anirudh's efforts to dismantle the powerful and malevolent Karakinkara cult.

== Cast ==
- Achyuth as Pavan Kumar
- Yamuna as Snigdha Devi
- Shanmukha Srinivas as Anirudh; Pavan and Snigdha's son
  - Master Anil Raj as young Anirudh
- Lakshmi as Masthanamma
- Vallabhaneni Janardhan as Professor Athma
- Ragini as Hema
- Suma Kanakala as Clara, a spirit guide
- Raja as Bheeshti Nayak, Karakinkara cult's head
- Meena as Ankitha
- Bangalore Padma
- Maharshi Raghava as Vidyadhar
- Hema as Mythri

== Production ==
The filming of the serial took place predominantly at Ramoji Film City, Hyderabad, where a huge Karakinkara set was constructed.

== Themes ==
The series explores a wide range of supernatural themes, including witchcraft, black magic, astral world, astral projection, demonic possession, spirits, ghosts, Ouija board usage, extrasensory perception, spirit guides, zombies, telepathy, and séances.

== Music ==
The title song of Anveshitha was composed by Madhavapeddi Suresh, written by C. Narayana Reddy, and sung by the noted singer K. S. Chithra. The song was acclaimed, earning Chithra a Nandi Award for her performance.

== Release ==
Anveshitha premiered on 27 August 1997, coinciding with the second anniversary of ETV. The series originally aired on Wednesdays at 8:30 PM and consisted of 100 episodes, each with a runtime of 18 to 24 minutes. The final episode was broadcast on 21 July 1999.

Following its initial run, Anveshitha was re-telecast from 2004 to 2006, continuing to garner viewership during the rerun.

== Critical reception ==
Anveshitha received widespread critical and audience acclaim for its unique and gripping storyline. Its horror elements resonated with viewers of all ages, making it a favourite among both children and adults. The character of 'Khabees' and the statue of Karakinkara became iconic symbols of the series.

The performances of the lead actors, Yamuna and Achyuth, were particularly praised, earning them recognition and making them household names across the state. The show's ability to blend supernatural themes with compelling drama contributed to its popularity and enduring appeal.

== Awards ==
Nandi TV Awards (Andhra Pradesh State Film, Music, Television and Arts Awards)

Year	Category	Recipient	Result	Ref.
1998	Best Screenplay	Ilyas - Jyotsna	Won	
1998	Best Costume	K. Koteswara Rao	Won	
1998	Best Villain	Raja	Won	
1998	Best Art Director	V. Bhaskara Raju	Won	
1999	Second Best Mega Serial	Ramoji Rao	Won	
1999	Best Playback Singer – Female	K. S. Chithra	Won	
1999	Best Makeup Artist	P. Murali	Won	
1999	Best Graphics	Eenadu Television	Won	
