= Tamil Nadu District Gazetteers =

Series of district encyclopedias published by the Government of Tamil Nadu, India

The Tamil Nadu District Gazetteers (previously Madras District Gazetteers) are a series of district encyclopedias published by the Government of Tamil Nadu.

== History ==
The concepts of individual district gazetteers originated in the mid 19th century. The Madras District Manual published by J. H. Nelson in 1868 was the first of its kind. This was followed by the South Arcot District Manual (John Henry Garstin, 1878), Trichinopoly District Manual (Lewis Moore, 1878), Chingleput District Manual (C. S. Crole, 1879), Tinnevely District Manual (A. J. Stuart, 1879), Nilgiris District Manual (H. B. Grigg, 1880), North Arcot District Manual (Arthur F. Cox, 1881), Salem District Manual (H. Le Fanu, 1883), Tanjore District Manual(T. Venkataswamy, 1883) and Coimbatore District Manual (F. A. Nicholson, 1887).

By the early 1900s, however, these manuals had become obsolete. Hence, they were revised in detail and expanded and re-published as district gazetteers. The first of the gazetteers appeared in 1906. Since then, there have been plenty of gazetteers published both in British as well as independent India. Post-independence, the work has been mainly handled by B. S. Baliga of the Madras Record Office.
