= Verukal Thedi =

- Directed by: V. Somashekhar
- Starring: Madhavi; Vishnuvardhan
- Music by: Sathyam
- Release date: 20 March 1987
- Country: India
- Language: Malayalam

Verukal Thedi is a 1987 Indian Malayalam film, directed by Somasekharan. The film stars Madhavi and Vishnuvardhan in the lead roles. The film has musical score by Sathyam.

== Cast ==
- Madhavi
- Vishnuvardhan

== Soundtrack ==
The music was composed by Sathyam and the lyrics were written by Poovachal Khader.

No.	Song	Singers	Lyrics	Length (m:ss)
1	"Ninnazhaku Kandu"	Unni Menon, Lathika	Poovachal Khader	
2	"Saayam Sandhya"	Unni Menon, Lathika	Poovachal Khader	
