= Nirosha =

Indian actress

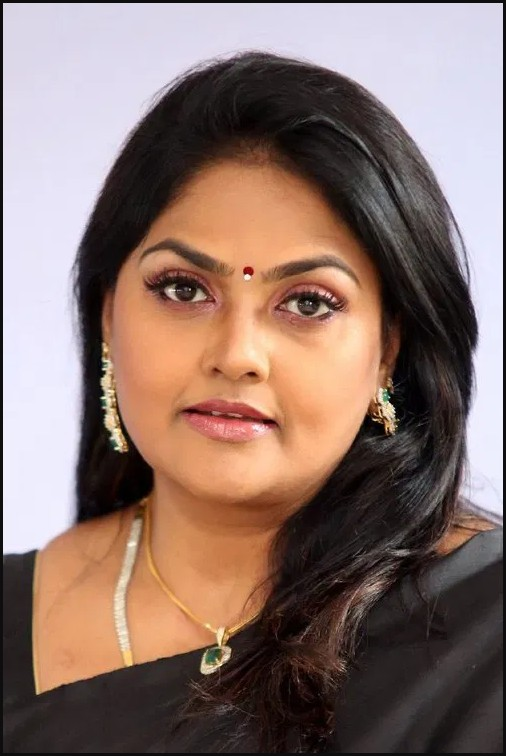
- Nirosha in 2024
- Born: Colombo, Sri Lanka
- Occupation: Actress
- Years active: 1988–present
- Spouse: Ramki (m. 1995)
- Relatives: Radha family

Nirosha is an Indian actress. She is known for her works predominantly in Tamil film industry. She has also starred in a few Telugu, Malayalam, Kannada and was popular in the 1990s. She has an elder sister Radhika Sarathkumar, who is also an actress. She also has two half-brothers Radha Ravi and M. R. R. Vasu.

== Filmography ==
=== Tamil ===
Year	Title	Role	Notes
1988	Agni Natchathiram	Ashok's girlfriend	
1988	Soora Samhaaram	Sudha	
1988	Senthoora Poove	Ponni	
1988	Paravaigal Palavitham	Janaki	
1988	Pattikattu Thambi		
1989	Paandi Nattu Thangam	Radha	
1989	En Kanavar		
1989	Sonthakkaran	Rekha	
1989	Kai Veesamma Kai Veesu		
1989	Poruthathu Pothum	Thilaka	
1990	Maruthu Pandi	Kavitha	
1990	Pachai Kodi	Sheela	
1990	Kavalukku Kettikaran	Arivukodi	
1990	Inaindha Kaigal	Julie	
1991	Manitha Jaathi		
1991	Vetri Padigal	Vimala	
1992	Annan Ennada Thambi Ennada		
1992	Amma Nagamma		
1993	Paarambariyam	Radha	
1994	Maindhan	Lakshmi	
1995	Valli Vara Pora	Kavitha	
1995	Puthiya Aatchi		Guest appearance
2000	Kandha Kadamba Kathir Vela	Ragini	
2003	Priyamaana Thozhi	Vasanthi	
2003	Kadhal Dot Com	Usha	
2003	Pavalakkodi	Baby	
2003	Winner	Neelaveni's cousin	
2003	Kurumbu	Jaya	
2005	Thaka Thimi Tha	Krishna's mother	
2005	Daas		
2006	Naalai		
2007	Nanbanin Kadhali	Sujatha's mother	
2007	Malaikottai	Kandasamy's wife	
2008	Silambattam	Jaanu's mother	
2009	Padikkadavan	Srinivasan's wife	
2010	Ambasamudram Ambani	Ranganayaki	
2013	Summa Nachunu Irukku	Chithra	
2014	Pappali		
2015	MGR Sivaji Rajini Kamal		
2015	Savaale Samaali	Anjali	
2016	Enakku Innoru Per Irukku	Dhanam	
2016	Ka Ka Ka Po		
2016	Vellikizhamai 13am Thethi	Ganesan's younger sister	
2016	Kaththi Sandai	Tamizhselvan's wife	
2018	Thaanaa Serndha Koottam	Kuthalingam's wife	
2019	Pottu	Pathology Professor	
2019	100	Sathya's mother	
2021	Oru Kudaikul		
2021	Raajavamsam	Veeralakhsmi	
2024	Lal Salaam	Fathima	
2026	Lockdown	Anitha's mother	

=== Telugu ===
Year	Title	Role	Notes
1989	Muddula Mavayya		
1990	Mahajananiki Maradalu Pilla	Devi	
1990	Nari Nari Naduma Murari	Neeru	
1990	Bujjigadi Babai		
1991	Kobbari Bondam	Meghamala	
1991	Madhura Nagarilo		
1991	Attintlo Adde Mogudu	Jhansi	
1991	Stuartpuram Police Station		
1991	Mugguru Attala Muddula Alludu		
1991	Tharangalu		
1991	Atirathudu		
1992	Naga Kanya		
1992	Detective Narada		
1992	Asadhyulu		
1992	Yamudannaki Mogudu		
1992	Bhale Khaideelu		
1992	Priyathama		
1992	Enkanna Babu		
1993	One by Two		
1993	Pachani Samsaram		
1995	Mounam		
1995	Hello Guru		
2003	Naa Allari		
2005	Oka Oorilo		
2019	Nuvvu Thopu Raa	Savitri	

=== Kannada ===
Year	Title	Role	Notes
1991	Ibbaru Hendira Muddina Police	Satya	
1993	Midida Hrudayagalu	Sampige	
1994	Lockup Death	Asha	
1994	Gandugali	Sangeetha	
1995	Mother India		
1995	Emergency		
1996	Palegara		
2013	Brindavana	Madhu's mother	
2023	Fighter	Radha	

=== Malayalam ===
Year	Title	Role	Notes
1988	Arjun Dennis		
1988	Oru Muthassi Katha	Karthu	
1995	Thacholi Varghese Chekavar	Annie Kutty	
1995	Sipayi Lahala	Sajitha	
1996	Indraprastham	Anitha Kulkarni	
2004	Njan Salperu Ramankutty	Dakshayani	
2005	Kalyana Kurimanam		

== Television ==
Year	Title	Role	Language	Channel
1996	Sudigundalu	Anitha	Telugu	ETV
1998	Manasa Kavvinchake	Madhuri	Telugu	ETV
1998	Nandini	Nandini	Tamil	Sun TV
1998–2000	Idhi Katha Kadu		Telugu	ETV
2000–2004	Bumperkuzhgal		Tamil	Jaya TV
2000–2004	Chinna Papa Periya Papa	Kavitha/Periya Papa	Tamil	Sun TV
2000–2001	Janani		Telugu	ETV
2001–2002	Manasa Kavvinchake		Telugu	ETV
2002–2003	Talli Prema		Telugu	Gemini TV
2005–2007	Katha Kani Katha		Telugu	Gemini TV
2014–2018	Thamarai	Rajalakshmi	Tamil	Sun TV
2014–2018	Chinna Papa Periya Papa	Kanakadurga	Tamil	Sun TV
2014–2016	Atho Athamma Kuthuro	Aishwarya	Telugu	Gemini TV
2018–2019	Maa Vidakulu	Virupakshi	Telugu	Gemini TV
2018–2020	Minnale	Kamala and Bhairavi	Tamil	Sun TV
2018–2019	Chandrakumari	Valli	Tamil	Sun TV
2018	Naan Kabali Alla		Tamil	Astro Ulagam
2020–2021	Uyire	Girija	Tamil	Colors Tamil
2021	Aanandhi	Nirmala	Tamil	Raj TV
2021–2022	Vaidhegi Kaathirundhaal	Amudha	Tamil	Star Vijay
2022–2023	Devathalara Deevinchandi	Bhavani	Telugu	Zee Telugu
2023–Present	Pandian Stores Chapter 2 - Thandhai Sollmikka Manthiramilai	Gomathi	Tamil	Star Vijay
2024	Baakiyalakshmi	Gomathi (Special appearance)	Tamil	Star Vijay
2026–present	Onna Irukka Kaththukkanum	Lakshmi	Tamil	Star Vijay

== Awards ==
=== Nandi Awards ===
- She won Nandi Special Jury Award for Stuartpuram Police Station (1991).
