= Balina Guri =

1978 film

- Directed by: K. S. Prakash Rao
- Written by: Hunsur Krishnamurthy (dialogues)
- Produced by: K. S. Prakash Rao
- Starring: Jayanthi; Master Nataraj; J. K. Srinivasamurthy; Balakrishna
- Cinematography: Srikanth
- Edited by: K. Venkateshwara Rao
- Music by: K. Chakravarthy
- Production company: Chithra Seema
- Distributed by: Chithra Seema
- Release date: 22 September 1978
- Running time: 134 min
- Country: India
- Language: Kannada

Balina Guri is a 1979 Indian Kannada film, directed by K. S. Prakash Rao and produced by K. S. Prakash Rao. The film stars Jayanthi, Master Nataraj, J. K. Srinivasamurthy and Balakrishna in the lead roles. The film has musical score by K. Chakravarthy.

== Cast ==
- Jayanthi
- Master Nataraj
- J. K. Srinivasamurthy
- Balakrishna
- Vajramuni
- Shivaram
- Seetharam
- Hanumathachar
- Mysore Gururaj
- Comedian Guggu
- Gode Lakshminarayan
- Pandari Bai
- Ramadevi
- Kalpana Shiroor
- Vijayabhanu
- Jayamalini
- Yamunabai
- Baby Rekha
- Ravi Chakravarthy
- Master Jayasimha
- Master GKT Shashi
- Master GKT Ravi
- Master Vishwanath
- Master Prakash
- Master Shekar
- Master Kumar
- Master Aravind C. Desai
