= Mahajananiki Maradalu Pilla =

- Directed by: Vallabhaneni Janardhan; Vijaya Bapineedu (Supervision)
- Written by: Kasi Viswanath (dialogues)
- Screenplay by: Vijaya Bapineedu
- Story by: Uday Kumar; Vijaya Bapineedu (Script)
- Produced by: M. Narasimha Rao
- Starring: Rajendra Prasad; Nirosha
- Cinematography: V. Srinivasa Reddy
- Edited by: Trinath
- Music by: Upendra Kumar
- Production company: Raasi Movie Creations
- Release date: 3 July 1990
- Running time: 132 mins
- Country: India
- Language: Telugu

Mahajananiki Maradalu Pilla (transl. Darling to multitudes) is a 1990 Indian Telugu-language comedy film directed by Vallabhaneni Janardhan under the supervision of Vijaya Bapineedu. Produced by M. Narasimha Rao under the Raasi Movie Creations banner, the film stars Rajendra Prasad and Nirosha in lead roles, with music composed by Upendra Kumar.

The film is a remake of the 1989 Kannada film Nanjundi Kalyana, which was based on Parvathavani's Kannada play Bahaddur Ganda, itself a translation of William Shakespeare's comedy The Taming of the Shrew.

== Plot ==
The film begins in a village where Dr. Ram Murthy lives with his wife, Seeta, and their three daughters in his in-laws' house. When Dr. Ram Murthy urgently needs money for a patient on the brink of death, his brother-in-law, Narayana Rao, refuses to help, resulting in the patient's death. This creates a rift between the two families, and Dr. Ram Murthy leaves with his family, severing ties with Narayana Rao.

Years later, Narayana Rao’s son, Ravi, decides to locate Dr. Ram Murthy and his family. He discovers that the family is in turmoil due to their eldest daughter, Devi, who is adamantly refusing to marry. Lack of marriage of the eldest sister is preventing the marriages of her two younger sisters, Lakshmi and Saraswati. Ravi decides to infiltrate his uncle's house by posing as his late father’s brother, Kishtayya, who was thought to have died.

Ravi, in the guise of Kishtayya, manages to manipulate Devi, who attempts to reject him but is unsuccessful. Frustrated, Devi goes to great lengths to label him insane, which leads to her public humiliation. With no other option, Devi agrees to marry Ravi (disguised as Kishtayya), but her true intention is to control him. Ravi accepts her challenge and vows to humble her.

The couple then returns to their village, where Ravi continues his charade as a servant and reveals his deception to Devi by exposing the mask he is wearing as Kishtayya. Upon learning the truth, Devi becomes upset but finds herself stranded. Ravi treats her harshly, which leads to her defamation of him and a serious illness. However, Ravi’s care and affection for her help her recover, and she realizes his true character, eventually bowing to him in respect.

Meanwhile, Narayana Rao informs Dr. Ram Murthy and Seeta about Ravi's impersonation of Kishtayya and Devi’s deteriorating condition. The family rushes to reunite with Devi and is overjoyed to see her transformed. In the end, Ravi reveals his true identity as Narayana Rao’s son, and the family is reunited, concluding the film on a happy note.

== Cast ==
- Rajendra Prasad as Ravi / Kishtayya
- Nirosha as Devi
- Satyanarayana as Dr. Ram Murthy
- Sridhar as Narayana Rao
- Rallapalli as Nakkapalli Narayana Swamy
- Brahmanandam as Dr. Vyayam Vyagreswara Rao
- Maharshi Raghava as Hari
- Dora Babu as Giri
- Srilakshmi as Aademma
- Shubha as Seeta
- Anitha as Ravi's mother
- Mamatha as Nakkapalli Rajeswari Devi
- Rajitha as Lakshmi
- Pavitra as Saraswathi
- Nirmalamma as Bamma

== Soundtrack ==
Mahajananiki Maradalu Pilla

Film score by Upendra Kumar
- Released: 1990
- Genre: Soundtrack
- Length: 24:50
- Label: Cauvery Audio
- Producer: Upendra Kumar

The film's music was composed by Upendra Kumar, with lyrics penned by Bhuvana Chandra. The soundtrack was released by Cauvery Audio Company. Upendra Kumar retained all six songs from the original Kannada version, which also featured his music.

No.	Title	Singer(s)	Length
1.	"Oka Rama Katha"	S. P. Balasubrahmanyam	5:01
2.	"Koka Thadipina"	S. P. Balasubrahmanyam, Manjula Gururaj	4:25
3.	"Espetu Papa"	S. P. Balasubrahmanyam	3:30
4.	"Mahajanaaniki Maradalu Pilla"	S. P. Balasubrahmanyam	4:04
5.	"Manuve Madhuram"	S. P. Balasubrahmanyam	3:30
6.	"Thappa Thagithe"	Manjula Gururaj	4:20
