= Vallabhaneni Janardhan =

Indian actor, producer, and director (1959–2022)

- Born: 25 September 1959; Pothunuru, Eluru district, Andhra Pradesh, India
- Died: 29 December 2022 (aged 63); Hyderabad, India
- Occupations: Actor, producer, director
- Spouse: V. Lalini Chowdary
- Children: Abhinaya, Avinash
- Relatives: Vijaya Bapineedu (father-in-law)

Vallabhaneni Janardhan (25 September 1959 – 29 December 2022) was an Indian actor, director, and producer known for his work in Telugu cinema. Over his career, he acted in more than 120 films and directed several projects.

Janardhan's most notable role is in the 1991 film Gang Leader. He also appeared in significant roles in films like Surya IPS (1991), Stuartpuram Dongalu (1991), and Lakshmi Narasimha (2004). In addition to his film career, Janardhan ventured into television with the show Anveshita (1998). He was the son-in-law of filmmaker Vijaya Bapineedu.

== Early life and education ==
Janardhan was born on 25 September 1959 in Pothunuru near Eluru, Andhra Pradesh into an affluent family. He completed his graduation from Loyola College in Vijayawada. During his college days, he actively participated in theatre, which ignited his passion for acting. He went on to establish a drama troupe called Kala Madhuri, earning recognition as both an actor and director in theatrical performances before transitioning to the film industry.

== Film career ==
=== Assistant director ===
Janardhan began his career in the film industry as an assistant director under K. Raghavendra Rao with the film Gajadonga (1980). He continued to work in the same capacity for notable films such as Tiruguleni Manishi (1981), Ragile Jwala (1981), and Kondaveeti Simham (1981).

=== Production and direction ===
Janardhan began his film career in production by founding Arjun Arts. He initially produced Mammagari Manavalu, but the film was ultimately canceled. He then turned to direction, remaking the Kannada film Manasa Sarovara (1982) as Amayaka Chakravarthi (1983) in Telugu, which became a major success. He also directed Thodu Needa (1983), a Telugu remake of the Hindi film Baseraa (1981). Later, Janardhan established another production company, Swetha International, under which he produced and directed films like Srimathi Kavali (1984) and Paripoyina Khaidilu (1985). Then, he directed the film Mahajananiki Maradalu Pilla (1990) under the supervision of his father-in-law, Vijaya Bapineedu. He was also involved in the production of Nee Kosam (1999), the debut film of director Srinu Vaitla, which starred Ravi Teja in the lead role.

=== Acting ===
Janardhan made his acting debut in his own directorial venture, Srimathi Kavali, stepping into a role when another actor was unavailable. He went on to appear in supporting roles in several acclaimed films, including Gang Leader (1991), Stuartpuram Dongalu (1991), and Surya IPS (1991). He acted in several films directed by his father-in-law, Vijaya Bapineedu. His portrayal of a police officer in Gang Leader garnered significant recognition and is considered one of the most notable performances of his career.

== Personal life ==
Janardhan married V. Lalini Chowdary, the third daughter of producer-director Vijaya Bapineedu. The couple had three children: Swetha (who died at a young age), Abhinaya, and Avinash. Janardhan died on 29 December 2022 in Hyderabad after a prolonged illness at the age of 63.

== Filmography ==
=== Director ===
- Amayaka Chakravarthi (1983)
- Thodu Needa (1983)
- Srimathi Kavali (1984)
- Paripoyina Khaidilu (1985)
- Mahajananiki Maradalu Pilla (1990)

Directorial supervision

- Mee Aayana Jagratha (1998)

=== Actor ===
==== Films ====
- Srimathi Kavali (1984)
- Stuvartpuram Dongalu (1991)
- Gang Leader (1991) as Latha's father
- People's Encounter (1991) as Home Minister
- Tharaka Prabhuni Deeksha Mahimalu (1991)
- Ashwini (1991)
- Surya IPS (1991) as Jailor
- Valu Jada Tholu Beltu (1992) as S.I.
- Chillara Mogudu Allari Koduku (1992)
- Samarpana (1992)
- Aasayam (1993)
- Kalachakram (1993)
- Akka Pettanam Chelleli Kapuram (1993)
- Sarasaala Soggadu (1993) as Rajaram
- Kishkindha Kanda (1994)
- Kurradi Kurradu (1994)
- Neram (1994)
- Vajram (1995)
- Miss 420 (1995)
- Family (1996)
- Ladies Doctor (1996) as 30-60-Patta-Katti
- Mee Aayana Jagratha (1998)
- Okkadu Chalu (2000)
- Budget Padmanabham (2001) as Padmanabham's boss
- Lakshmi Narasimha (2004)
- Nagaram (2008)
- Bhale Dongalu (2008)
- Adhineta (2009)

==== Television ====
- Ruthuragalu (1997–2000)
- Anveshitha (1998)
