= Shanmukha Srinivas =

Indian film actor

- Born: Eluru, Andhra Pradesh
- Occupations: Actor, dancer
- Years active: 1987 - 1992

N. Shanmukha Srinivas, (born 1980) is an Indian actor and Kuchipudi dancer from Andhra Pradesh. He primarily works in Telugu cinema. He is starred in 20 feature films as a child artist. He played the lead protagonist in the daily serial Anveshitha.

== Early life ==
He was born to N. Sivarama Krishna in Eluru, West Godavari district, Andhra Pradesh, India.

== Selected filmography ==
Year	Film	Cast	Role	Language	Notes
1987	Jebu Donga	Chiranjeevi	Child artist	Telugu	Debut film
1987	Sruthilayalu	Rajasekhar	Srinivas	Telugu	Nandi Award for Best Child Actor
1988	The Deceivers	Pierce Brosnan	Hira Lal	English	
1988	Swarnakamalam	Daggubati Venkatesh	Srinivas	Telugu	Nandi Award for Best Child Actor
1988	Mugguru Kodukulu	Krishna	As Young Krishna	Telugu	
1991	Ayappa Swamy Mahathyam	Sarath Babu	Ayappa	Telugu	
1994	Kaurava Samrajyam	Chandra Mohan	young artist	Telugu	
1997 - 1999	Anveshitha	Achyuth	Grown-up Anirudh	Telugu	TV serial aired in ETV
