= Kai Veesamma Kai Veesu =

1989 film by Vinodh

- Title card
- Directed by: Vinodh
- Written by: Vinodh
- Produced by: M. Balachandran
- Starring: Murali; Radhika; Nirosha
- Cinematography: Y. N. Murali
- Edited by: B. Lenin-V. T. Vijayan (supervising); S. Ramesh-B. Shankar
- Music by: Ilaiyaraaja
- Production company: M. B. C. Arts
- Release date: 14 July 1989
- Country: India
- Language: Tamil

Kai Veesamma Kai Veesu (transl. Swing your arms kid, swing your arms) is a 1989 Indian Tamil-language film directed by Vinodh, starring Murali, Radhika and Nirosha. It was released on 14 July 1989, delayed from May. The film was dubbed in Telugu as Kaliyuga Durga in 1990.

== Cast ==
- Murali
- Radhika
- Nirosha
- Srikanth
- Nizhalgal Ravi
- Chinni Jayanth
- Jai Ganesh
- Rajya Lakshmi
- S. S. Chandran
- Kovai Sarala
- Vennira Aadai Moorthy
- Vinu Chakravarthy
- Nassar

== Soundtrack ==
The soundtrack was composed by Ilaiyaraaja.

| Song | Singers | Lyrics |
|---|---|---|
| "Enakkum Unakkum" | Arunmozhi, S. Janaki | Vaali |
| "Kai Veesamma" | Ilaiyaraaja | Vaali |
| "Nal Anbedhan" | K. S. Chithra | Piraisoodan |
| "Yeruthe Sudhi" | S. Janaki | Gangai Amaran |
| "Ennadi Amma" | Mano | Gangai Amaran |

== Critical reception ==
P. S. S. of Kalki praised the cinematography and dialogues but criticised the presentation of the film.
