= Jebu Donga (1987 film) =

- Poster
- Directed by: A. Kodandarami Reddy
- Produced by: M. Arjuna Raju; M. Ramalinga Raju]
- Starring: Chiranjeevi; Bhanupriya; Radha; Shanmukha Srinivas; Raghuvaran
- Cinematography: Lok Singh
- Edited by: M. Vellaiswamy
- Music by: K. Chakravarthy
- Production company: Roja Movies
- Distributed by: Geetha Arts
- Release date: 25 December 1987
- Country: India
- Language: Telugu

Jebu Donga (transl. Pickpocketeer) is a 1987 Indian Telugu-language film directed by A. Kodandarami Reddy. The film stars Chiranjeevi, Bhanupriya and Radha in important roles. It was later dubbed in Hindi as Aaj Ka Gang Leader. It was produced by M. Arjuna Raju and M. Ramalinga Raju under the Roja Movies banner.

== Plot ==
Chittibabu and Bujjamma are small-time thieves who are fighting with each other. Sathyanarayana and Gollapudi are CBI officers who are investigating Kannada Prabhakar (KP) and his activities in his secret forest hideout with the help of a secret agent. When the agent gets killed, they suspect infiltrators in their agency and make Chiru as the decoy agent so that their actual agent can get the info. The villains, thinking that Chiru is a CBI agent try to kill him and create problems for him, which he doesn't understand and he becomes involved in a murder case to be rescued by a beautiful girl (Radha). He later learns of the confusion on him from the officers and refuses to help them. But when he learns that Radha is the actual agent and is the daughter of Satyanarayana trying to bring criminals to justice, he feels responsible for the country and joins hands with them in eliminating the threat posed by KP's organization.

== Cast ==
- Chiranjeevi as Chitti Babu / Chakrapani
- Bhanupriya as Bujjamma
- Radha as Sreeja
- Shanmukha Srinivas as Chitti Babu's brother
- Raghuvaran as Teja
- Kannada Prabhakar as Jimoomba
- Babu Antony as Mike
- Kota Srinivasa Rao as Rambantu
- Kaikala Satyanarayana as CBI Director Gajapathi
- Gollapudi Maruthi Rao as Balaram
- C.S. Rao as Peter Samuel
- Kuyili as Stella, Teja's moll
- Giri Babu as Venkat
- Annapurna as Chitti Babu's mother
- Prasad Babu as Police Inspector
- Rallapalli as Head Constable
- Hari Prasad as Chitti Babu's lawyer friend
- Sudhakar as Himself
- Prasanna Kumar as Rocky

== Soundtrack ==
No.	Title	Singer(s)	Length
1.	"Pedavi Pedavi"	S. P. Balasubrahmanyam, K. S. Chithra
2.	"Hawa Hawai Choopokati"	S. P. Balasubrahmanyam, S. Janaki
3.	"Aa Aadhi Gunta"	S. P. Balasubrahmanyam, Chithra
4.	"Rajullo Rajyalakshmi"	S. P. Balasubrahmanyam, P. Susheela
5.	"Pora Kuyya"	S. P. Balasubrahmanyam, S. Janaki
6.	"Tattukolenabbi"	S. P. Balasubrahmanyam, P. Susheela
