= Mee Aayana Jagratha =

- DVD cover
- Directed by: Muthyala Ramadas; Vallabhaneni Janardhan (Supervision)
- Written by: Sri Amulya Arts Unit (dialogues)
- Screenplay by: Vallabhaneni Janardhan
- Story by: Vallabhaneni Janardhan
- Produced by: Usha Rani; C.Kalyan (Presents)
- Starring: Rajendra Prasad; Roja
- Cinematography: N. V. Suresh Kumar
- Edited by: K. Ramesh
- Music by: Koti; Vinayak Rao
- Production company: Sri Ammulya Art Productions
- Release date: 30 October 1998
- Running time: 116 minutes
- Country: India
- Language: Telugu

Mee Aayana Jagratha (transl. Take Care of your Husband) is 1998 Indian Telugu-language comedy film directed by Muthyala Ramadas, with Vallabhaneni Janardhan's direction supervision. It stars Rajendra Prasad and Roja, with music composed by Koti and Vinayak Rao. It was produced by Usha Rani, C. Kalyan under the Sri Amulya Art Productions banner. The film was recorded as a flop at the box office. The movie was a loose adaptation of the 1975 Tamil movie Yarukku Maappillai Yaro.

== Plot ==
The film begins with an unemployed youth, Gopi Krishna, who is slightly concerned about the lack of a small amount to attend an interview. Then, he flashes with his childhood buddy Bose, and with his aid, Gopi arrives safely. A rigid, fearsome Retired Army Major heads the organization whom Gopi impresses. At the second level, his daughter Sundari takes it up, and he triumphs, too. Gopi is startled to know it is Sundari's spouse's selection. Thus, Major knits them and delegates Gopi to be the Managing Director of his enterprise. Sundari pauses their first night until she completely ascertains her husband's personality, which Gopi fully upholds. Later, Gopi sights Bose provides him with an excellent job & comfort, who tells Gopi about his crazy love with Latha.

Meanwhile, Raksha, a call girl, lures the men, and the whole city is flat before her. Once Gopi acquaints and infatuates with her, he trails for a pleasurable time. So, he tactically picks up Bose's room keys and walks in when the guilt of betraying Sundari haunts and backs him. Suddenly, a hardship knocks through Sundari, stepping on an address quest. Bewildered, Gopi struggles to wangle by counterfeiting Raksha as Bose's wife. As a glimpse, Robert, a stupid thug, falls for Raksha at first sight, incognizant of her profession, and proposes to her, but she pocks fun of him. On the eve of Sundari's birthday, she asks Gopi to invite Bose's couple, so he convinces Bose, and they shuttle Raksha on the hire. During their drop, Latha arrives when Gopi introduces Raksha as his own.

From there, cat & mouse game starts. Sundari bows down before Gopi's virtue, which initiates their maternal life, and she conceives. Bose decides to espouse Latha, which Gopi covertly plots at a temple, to be safe. Major & Sundari reach the same spot out of the blue, and Robert also brings Raksha. Amidst the turmoil, Gopi pulls wires and accomplishes the nuptial. After a while, Sundari misconstrues viewing Bose with Latha that he is maintaining a courtship. Eventually, Latha also thinks likewise by noticing Gopi & Sundari. To expel Robert, Raksha roleplays and incriminates him for rape. Latha contacts her maternal uncle Papa Rao, a bankrupted hoodlum, to abduct Sundari because of the events muddle. Yet, Papa Rao attempts to exploit it to cover his losses, blackmails Major, and receives his batter. Now, Gopi & Bose affirm to close the drama via Raksha when she seeks one last favor to enact Gopi as her husband for her dying mother's fulfillment. Gopi pure-heartedly sets foot according to her pathetic state, but Sundari spots them and attempts suicide. At once, Papa Rao seizes her with Latha & Raksha and Gopi & Bose behind them. Parallelly, Robert breaks the bars and chases them. At last, Raksha clarifies the totality to Sundari & Latha when Robert wholeheartedly accepts Raksha, and they all cease Papa Rao. Finally, the movie ends happily with the three pairs blessed by baby boys after a year.

== Cast ==
- Rajendra Prasad as Gopi Krishna
- Roja as Sundari
- Brahmanandam as Robert
- Sivaji Raja as Bosu
- Vallabhaneni Janardhan as Major
- M. S. Narayana as Minor
- Duvvasi Mohan as Robert's henchman
- Venu Madhav
- Tirupathi Prakash
- Jenny
- Raksha as Raksha
- Latha Sri as Latha

== Soundtrack ==
Mee Aayana Jagratha

Film score by Koti
- Released: 1998
- Genre: Soundtrack
- Length: 20:23
- Label: SWETHA Audio
- Producer: Koti

Koti chronology
Prema Pallaki (1998)	Mee Aayana Jagratha (1998)	Srivarante Maavare (1998)

Music composed by Koti. Music released on SWETHA Audio Company.

No.	Title	Lyrics	Singer(s)	Length
1.	"Jaabilamma"	Samavedam Shanmukha Sarma	S. P. Balasubrahmanyam, Chitra	3:58
2.	"Vaana Vaana"	Anil Narendra	Mano, Sunitha	3:47
3.	"Na Holi Rangeli Music: Vinayak Rao"	Sahithi	Mano, Chitra	4:20
4.	"Andam Debba Kottinde"	Anil Narendra	Mano, Sunitha	4:04
5.	"Tyte Jeans Vesi Music: Vinayak Rao"	Sahithi	Mano, Sunitha	4:24
Total length:				20:23

== Reception ==
A critic from Deccan Herald wrote that "While Muthyala Ramdas makes his debut as director, senior artiste Vallabhaneni Janardhan has written the story and screenplay. The musical score by newcomer Vinayak is just average. Double-edged dialogues by Marudhuri Raja succeed in adding new synonyms to the dictionary of risque words".
