= Havina Hede =

- VCD cover
- Directed by: V. Somashekhar
- Produced by: Parvathamma Rajkumar
- Starring: Rajkumar; Sulakshana; Thoogudeepa Srinivas
- Cinematography: R. Madhusudhan
- Edited by: P. Bhaktavatsalam
- Music by: G. K. Venkatesh
- Production company: Poornima Enterprises
- Distributed by: Vajreshwari Combines; Chandrika Movies; Venkateshwara Movies
- Release date: 1981
- Running time: 174 minutes
- Country: India
- Language: Kannada

Havina Hede ( transl. Snake's hood) is a 1981 Indian Kannada-language action film directed by V. Somashekhar and produced by Parvathamma Rajkumar. The film featured Rajkumar and Sulakshana playing the pivotal roles. The film was written by M. D. Sundar and had lyrics and dialogues written by Chi. Udaya Shankar.

The film featured a successful original score and soundtrack composed by G. K. Venkatesh. Rajkumar also appeared as Bhima in a small drama sequence in the movie.

== Cast ==
- Rajkumar as Muthanna/Raj
- Sulakshana as Rani (Voice dubbed by B. Jayashree)
- Sampath as Ramanna, Muthanna's Father
- Shakti Prasad as Raja Ramnath, Rani's Father
- Thoogudeepa Srinivas as Prasad
- Tiger Prabhakar as Anthony
- Uma Shivakumar as Subbalakshmi, Ramnath's elder sister
- Rathnakar as Subbalakshmi's husband
- M. S. Umesh as Sundru
- Maanu as Shivanna, Muthanna's Elder Brother
- B. V. Radha as Mangala, Shivanna's wife
- Sudheer as Prabhakar, Prasad's henchman
- Dinesh as Narayana
- R. N. Sudarshan as Shyam
- Papamma as Muthanna's Mother
- Shani Mahadevappa as Bar owner
- Honnavalli Krishna as Fortune Teller
- Bhatti Mahadevappa as Somanna

== Soundtrack ==
The music was composed by G. K. Venkatesh to the lyrics of Chi. Udaya Shankar.

Track listing
No.	Title	Lyrics	Singer(s)	Length
1.	"Bere Enu Beda Endigu"	Chi. Udaya Shankar	Rajkumar, Vani Jayaram	04:23
2.	"Bisi Bisi Kajjaya"	Chi. Udaya Shankar	Rajkumar	03:56
3.	"Hoovinda Bareda Katheya"	Chi. Udaya Shankar	Rajkumar	04:25
4.	"My Name is Raj"	Chi. Udaya Shankar	Rajkumar	04:02
