= Sruthilayalu =

Sruthilayalu శ్రుతిలయలు
- Directed by: K. Viswanath
- Written by: K. Viswanath
- Produced by: Karunakar; Sudhakar
- Starring: Rajasekhar; Sumalatha; Shanmukha Srinivas; Jayalalita; Naresh
- Cinematography: G. V. Subba Rao
- Edited by: G. G. Krishna Rao
- Music by: K. V. Mahadevan
- Release date: 30 April 1987
- Running time: 160 minutes
- Country: India
- Language: Telugu

Sruthilayalu (Telugu: శ్రుతిలయలు) is a 1987 Telugu-language musical drama film, directed by K. Viswanath. The film stars Rajasekhar and Sumalatha with soundtrack composed by K. V. Mahadevan. It was released on 30 April 1987. The film garnered eight Nandi Awards and also won Filmfare Award for Best Director – Telugu. The film was premiered at the International Film Festival of India, and AISFM Film Festival. The film was dubbed in Tamil as Isaikku Oru Koil.

== Plot ==
Vasireddy Venkatapati Naidu, a wealthy village landlord and Carnatic musician, aspires to establish a premier academy of classical arts named Sangeetha Bharathi. After his biological son, a talented dancer and musician, dies in a car accident, Naidu and his wife, Lalitha, adopt three orphaned children—Narayana Murthy, Sankaram, and Murali—to train them in music and carry forward his legacy. Murthy, who attains widespread recognition as a premier classical singer, falls in love with Sita, an ardent admirer of classical music.

When Naidu loses his wealth due to accumulated debts, the family relocates to a modest home. To earn money and fulfil their father's dream, the three brothers move to Madras. However, unexpected wealth and greed eventually corrupt the brothers. They succumb to hedonistic urban lifestyles and severe vices, completely abandoning the cause for which they were sent. Naidu orchestrates Murthy's wedding with Sita while Sankaram marries Girija, a woman from an affluent background, and relocates to live with her family. Realizing that his adopted sons have fundamentally changed and no longer care for his vision, a disheartened Naidu departs to his home alongside Lalitha. Concurrently, Murthy enters into an extramarital affair with Panchali, who exploits his musical talent for her personal financial gain.

When Naidu falls ill, the brothers and their respective families return to the village. Sita openly condemns Murthy's selfish behavior and infidelity, prompting an enraged Murthy to slap her. Deeply offended by their moral degradation, Naidu formally disowns and banishes the trio from his life. Sita, remaining fiercely loyal to her father-in-law, refuses to remain with Murthy. She instead chooses to migrate to North India alongside Naidu and Lalitha.

Years pass, and the family settles in Haridwar, where Sita raises her son, Srinivas Murthy, who develops into a child prodigy mastering both Carnatic music and classical dance at a very young age. Determined to reform the brothers using Srinivas as an emotional bridge, Sita returns to Madras and strategically introduces the boy into their social circles. Oblivious to the fact that Srinivas is Murthy's biological son, the estranged family members—including a childless Girija—quickly grow deeply attached to him. Murthy recognizes the boy's immense innate talent and agrees to train him further in music. Through this mentorship, Murthy gradually rediscovers his passion for pure art, overcomes his chronic alcoholism, and uncovers Panchali's financial deceit.

As Srinivas systematically exposes the brothers' moral hollowness and artistic stagnation through a series of incidents quietly orchestrated by Sita, the three brothers are forced to confront their past transgressions. Prior to a grand classical dance recital by Srinivas, which is graced by an attending Naidu, the remorseful brothers reconcile with their adoptive father through music and seek his forgiveness. During the performance, Sita surprises the gathering by joining Murthy on stage to sing the vocal accompaniment for their son's dance. The family realizes Srinivas's true identity, resulting in an emotional reunion. The film concludes as the inspired audience generously donates toward the construction of Sangeetha Bharathi, indicating its off-screen establishment.

== Cast ==
- Rajasekhar as Narayana Murthy
- Sumalatha as Sita
- Kaikala Satyanarayana as Vasireddy Venkatapati Naidu
- Shanmukha Srinivas as Srinivas
- Murali Krishna as Murali
- Naresh as Sankaram
- Anjali Devi as Lalitha
- Mucherla Aruna as Girija
- Jayalalita as Panchali
- Mallikarjuna Rao
- Jit Mohan Mitra as Anjaneyulu
- Potti Prasad
- Sakshi Ranga Rao as Ramadasu
- Vankayala Satyanarayana
- Sanjay Vadapalli

== Soundtrack ==
Soundtrack composed by K. V. Mahadevan was released through LEO music label. Lyrics were written by Sirivennela Seetharama Sastry while this film used songs of Annamacharya, Tyagaraja, Narayana Teertha and Shailendra.

Track list
No.	Title	Lyrics	Singer(s)	Length
1.	"Inni Raasula"	Annamacharya	S. P. Balasubrahmanyam, Vani Jayaram	5:06
2.	"Aalokaye Sri Balakrishnam"	Narayana Teertha	Vani Jayaram	4:53
3.	"Janaki Kaantha Smaranam"	Traditional Bhajan	S. P. Balasubrahmanyam	1:00
4.	"Telavaarademo Swamy (Female)"	Sirivennela Seetharama Sastry	P. Susheela	2:03
5.	"Thika Thika"	Thillana Traditional	Purna Chander	3:11
6.	"Sri Saaradaamba"	Sirivennela Seetharama Sastry	S. Janaki	4:12
7.	"Saamajavaragaana (Mandolin Beat)"	Tyagaraja	S. P. Sailaja	3:44
8.	"Telavaarademo Swamy (Male)"	Sirivennela Seetharama Sastry	K. J. Yesudas	3:05
9.	"Sri Gananaadam"	Tyagaraja	Purna Chander, Vani Jayaram, S. Srinivas	4:03
10.	"Kori Vacchitinayyaa"	Tyagaraja	Purna Chander	1:19
11.	"Mera Jootha Hai Japani"	Shailendra	S. Janaki	0:59
12.	"Tanadu Varasatwamunu"	Sirivennela Seetharama Sastry	S. P. Balasubrahmanyam, P. Susheela	4:32
13.	"Tandanaana Ahi"	Annamacharya	S. P. Balasubrahmanyam	4:25
Total length:				42:32

== Awards ==
Award	Category	Recipient(s) and nominee(s)	Result	Ref(s)
Nandi Awards	Best Feature Film - Gold	Producer: Karunakar, Sudhakar	Won	
Nandi Awards	Best Actress	Sumalatha	Won	
Nandi Awards	Best Director	K. Viswanath	Won	
Nandi Awards	Best Music Director	K. V. Mahadevan	Won	
Nandi Awards	Best Choreographer	K. V. Satyanarayana	Won	
Nandi Awards	Best Lyricist	Sirivennela Seetharama Sastry	Won	
Nandi Awards	Best Audiographer	A. R. Swaminadhan	Won	
Nandi Awards	Best Child Actor	Shanmukha Srinivas	Won	
Filmfare Awards South	Best Director	K. Viswanath	Won	
Cine Goer's Film Awards	Best Film	Producer: Karunakar, Sudhakar	Won	
Cine Goer's Film Awards	Best Director	K. Viswanath	Won	
