= Diya Aur Toofan (1995 film) =

- DVD cover
- Directed by: K. Bapaiah
- Written by: Sanmugam Sundram; Kader Khan (dialogues)
- Screenplay by: Shanmugasundaram
- Story by: M. D. Sundar
- Produced by: Suresh Bokadia
- Starring: Mithun Chakraborty; Madhoo; Suresh Oberoi; Mohnish Bahl; Kader Khan
- Cinematography: A. Venkat
- Edited by: Shyam Mukherjee, Govind Balwadi
- Music by: Bappi Lahiri
- Production company: BMB Combines
- Release date: 27 October 1995
- Running time: 125 minutes
- Country: India
- Language: Hindi

Diya Aur Toofan (transl. The lamp and the storm) is a 1995 Indian Hindi-language science fiction action film directed by K. Bapaiah, starring Mithun Chakraborty, Madhoo, Suresh Oberoi, Mohnish Bahl and Kader Khan. This film was released on 27 October 1995 under the banner of BMB Combines. This film is a remake of the 1979 Kannada film Seetharamu.

== Plot ==
Gajendra Singh is a wealthy contractor who, with his partner Madanlal, sells government provided building materials into the black market, exchanging them for inferior ones. A civil engineer and his supervisor find out and, upon their meeting, are subsequently murdered by Gajendra. While Dr. Vijay is unable to treat the two workers, he gets a letter informing himself that his friend Amar, a gold medalist engineer, is the replacement engineer for the crooked contractors. Amar, just like his predecessors, is very honest and won't do with what his bosses tell him to. After an attempt to bribe Amar, the contractors get beaten up, and Amar threatens to expose them. Joginder, Gajendra's son, is a rogue who sets his eyes on Asha, Amar's eventual wife-to-be. On their wedding night, Gajendra, Madanlal, and Joginder all stab Amar, and Asha, when finding out, goes crazy. During a frenzied visit to the temple one night, she slips and falls down the stone steps leading to permanent brain damage. Vijay then transplants Amar's brain into Asha's body, and Asha eventually kills the trio one by one. Before she hangs Gajendra, she is shot by the police, and in a dying soliloquy, claims that she will be with Amar for eternity.

== Cast ==
- Mithun Chakraborty as Amar
- Madhoo as Asha
- Suresh Oberoi as Dr. Vijay Mehra
- Prem Chopra as Thakur Gajendra Singh
- Mohnish Behl as Joginder Singh
- Shakti Kapoor as Madanlal Tabedaar
- Kader Khan as Gyaneshwar
- Asrani as Solanki
- Vijay Arora as Mohan Kumar

== Music ==
1. "Kundi Dheere Se Khatkana" - Ila Arun
2. "Dhoom Tara Tara Dhoom Tara Tara" - Kavita Krishnamurthy, Kumar Sanu
3. "Sapno Me Dekha Tha" - Sudesh Bhosle
4. "Odhe Lal Chunariya" - Kavita Krishnamurthy
5. "Nagri Nagri Dhunda O Sajna" - Udit Narayan, Kavita Krishnamurthy
6. "Ek Diya Aur Toofan" - Alka Yagnik
