= Gajendra (1984 film) =

1984 Kannada film

- LP Vinyl cover
- Directed by: V. Somashekhar
- Written by: Chi. Udaya Shankar (dialogue)
- Screenplay by: M. D. Sundar
- Story by: M. D. Sundar
- Cinematography: Chittibabu
- Edited by: Yadav Victor
- Music by: G. K. Venkatesh
- Production company: Gajaraja Pictures
- Release date: 1984
- Running time: 2 hours 36 minutes
- Country: India
- Language: Kannada

Gajendra is a 1984 Indian Kannada-language political thriller film directed by V. Somashekhar based on a screenplay by M. D. Sundar. The film stars Ambareesh playing the title character along with Pavithra, Vajramuni, T. N. Balakrishna and Sudheer in other supporting roles. The film's songs were composed by G. K. Venkatesh, with lyrics written by Chi. Udayashankar. The film was released on 14 February 1984.

== Cast ==
- Ambarish as Gajendra
- Pavithra
- Vajramuni
- T. N. Balakrishna
- Shakti Prasad
- Sudheer
- C. H. Lokanath
- M. S. Karanth
- Mukhyamantri Chandru
- Lohithaswa

== Soundtrack ==
1. Rama Krishna Gandhi Buddha - S P Balasubrahmanyam and Chorus
2. Amma Ammamma - S P Balasubrahmanyam and Vani Jairam
3. Antasthu Yellide? - S P Balasubrahmanyam
4. Partner Hello Partner - S P Balasubrahmanyam and M Ramesh
5. Ravi Baninda Jarabeku Gilirama - S P Balasubrahmanyam and Vani Jairam

Gajendra

Soundtrack album by G. K. Venkatesh
- Genre: Feature film soundtrack
- Label: Inreco
