= Thaayi Saheba =

1997 film by Girish Kasaravalli

- Poster
- Directed by: Girish Kasaravalli
- Screenplay by: Girish Kasaravalli
- Story by: Ranganath Shyam Rao Lokapura
- Based on: Thaayi Saheba by Ranganath Shyam Rao Lokapura
- Produced by: Jayamala
- Starring: Jayamala; Suresh Heblikar
- Cinematography: H. M. Ramachandra
- Edited by: M. N. Swamy
- Music by: Isaac Thomas Kottukapally
- Production company: Sri Soundarya Arts
- Release date: 31 December 1997
- Running time: 117 minutes
- Country: India
- Language: Kannada

Thaayi Saheba (transl. Mother Saheba) is an Indian Kannada language film released in 1997 directed by Girish Kasaravalli. The film was an adaptation of a Kannada novel of the same name written by Ranganath Shyamrao Lokapura.

== Plot ==
The film is based on the story of a Brahmin family during the pre-independence and post-independence periods of India. The protagonist, Narmada Thayi, is the second wife of Appa Sahib, a freedom fighter. The childless couple decide to adopt the child of Venkobanna, a close relative. Venkobanna has other plans in mind when he gives away his child for adoption. He calculates that his son will inherit the family's money and property. In the meantime, Appa Sahib also has an illicit relationship with Chandri and a daughter is born to them. Narmada Thayi is a patient woman and although aware of her husband's character, she supports him and the household. After the independence, Appa Sahib supports the government's view that the labourers who till the land own them. Venkobanna is angered to see this long-awaited plan of his crumble due to the utopian views of App Sahib. After a brief illness, Appa Sahib leaves the house one day with a group of people to protest for the sake of the farmers never to return again. Months after this, Narmada learns that her husband has been imprisoned by the government. But no other detail regarding Appa Sahib comes to light. Narmada Thayi is the only one capable of handling the household. She seeks the help of Venkobanna to help her handle monetary issues. Meanwhile, their adopted son comes of age. The story takes a surprise and unexpected turn when Thayi Saheba discovers that her adopted son is in love with Appa Sahib's mistress's daughter, who legally is his sister. She tries in vain to convince her son not to go against social ethics. With Chandri, Narmada Thayi sets out to find her husband. Together they travel to many prisons, but Appa Sahib is never found. Thayi Saheba must either save the son, who seeks freedom to marry Chandri's daughter or save herself because if she supports the marriage, she could be jailed. She tries to cancel the adoption, but no such thing as adoption cancellation existed then. She also tries to see if somebody can adopt Chandri's daughter, but adopting a girl child was not allowed legally at that time. Finally, Thayi Saheba tells her son that he is free to do whatever he wants. She gets ready to face the serious consequences of the marriage. The film ends with Thayi Saheba waiting on the steps of her house and an angered Venkobanna arriving with the police and announcing their arrival.

== Cast ==
- Jayamala as Narmada (Thaayi Sahib)
- Suresh Heblikar as Balakrishnan Inamdar (Appa Sahib)
- Shivaram as Venkob Rao
- Harish Raju as Narayana (Nanu/Bala)
- Bharath
- Ranukamma Murugodu
- Basavaraj Murugodu
- Sudha Belawadi as Chandri
- Vijaya Ekkundi
- Rathi Manjunath
- Deepa Rabakavi
- Sunanda Kadapatti
- Vishweshwara Surapura
- Venkata Rao
- H. G. Somasekhara Rao

== Production ==
Jayamala, a fan of Kasaravalli's works, expressed interest in acting in his film and decided to produce the film. Kasaravalli decided to adapt the novel of the same name, as Jayamala wanted to play the main heroine. Unlike the novel, Kasaravalli made changes to the film's screenplay, borrowing only a few incidents from the novel while increasing the importance of character Narmada and changing Venkobaraya's role, who was portrayed as "man of vices" in the novel by giving him "measure of dignity". The filming was held at a wadi near Jhumkhandi. Ramachandra, FTII-trained cinematographer and former assistant to Nagabharana, made his debut as a cinematographer. He and Jayamala got married during the film's production.

== Awards and screenings ==
45th National Film Awards

- Best Film — Girish Kasaravalli
- Special Jury Award — Jayamala
- Best Costume Design — Vaishali Kasaravalli
- Best Art Direction — Ramesh Desai

Mysore Sandal Gold Awards

- Best Film
- Best Cinematographer — Ramachandra
- Best Actress — Jayamala

46th Filmfare Awards South

- The film won three Filmfare Awards in the Kannada film category.
- Best Film
- Best Director — Girish Kasaravalli
- Best Actress — Jayamala

V Shantaram Awards

- Best Film
- Best Director — Girish Kasaravalli

1997–98 Karnataka State Film Awards

- First Best Film
- Best Actress — Jayamala
- Best Supporting Actor — Shivaram
- Best Story — Ranganath Shyam Rao Lokapura
- Best Cinematographer — H. M. Ramachandra

Screenings

- Vancouver Film Festival
