= Akramana =

1979 film

- Directed by: Girish Kasaravalli
- Written by: G. S. Sadashiva (dialogues)
- Screenplay by: G. S. Sadashiva
- Story by: B. V. Vaikunta Raju (Based on Novel)
- Produced by: Sharath Kumar; S. Rao
- Starring: Vijayakashi; Vaishali Kasaravalli; Padmashree; Chandrakumar Jain
- Cinematography: S. Ramachandra
- Edited by: Stanly
- Music by: B. V. Karanth
- Production company: Sri Sainath Productions
- Distributed by: Sri Sainath Productions
- Release date: 13 September 1979
- Running time: 110 min
- Country: India
- Language: Kannada

Akramana is a 1979 Indian Kannada film, directed by Girish Kasaravalli and produced by Sharath Kumar and S. Rao. The film stars Vijayakashi, Vaishali Kasaravalli, Padmashree and Chandrakumar Jain in the lead roles. The film has musical score by B. V. Karanth.

== Cast ==
- Vijayakashi
- Vaishali Kasaravalli
- Padmashree
- Chandrakumar Jain
- Sai Venkatesh
- Girish Kumar Yadav
- Prakash Reddy
- Srinath
- G. G. Hegde
- Bhaskar
- Venkata Rao
- Shivaramaiah
- Devaiah
- Dr Chitagopi
- S. N. Rotti
- K. S. Anantharam
- B. S. Jayaram
- Swarnamma
- Pushpa
- Dechamma
- Swarnamma
- Mala
- Master Sanjeev
