= Harold Stuart =

Indian Civil Servant (1860–1923)

Sir Harold Arthur Stuart
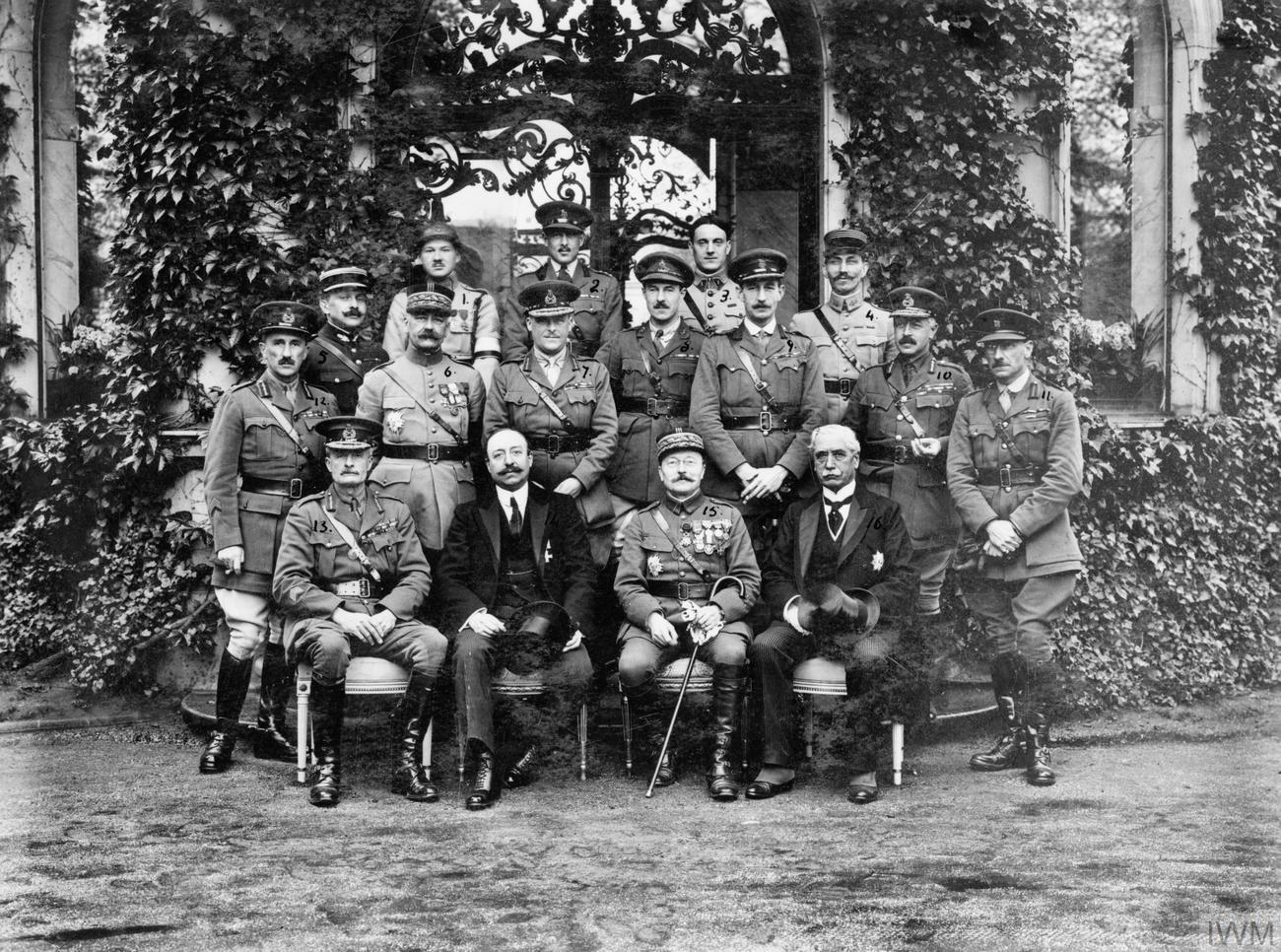
- Stuart, 1919 (seated, far-right)
- Born: 29 July 1860; York, United Kingdom
- Died: 1 March 1923 (aged 62)
- Occupations: Indian Civil Servant, Director of the Central Criminal Intelligence Department, Home Secretary

Sir Harold Arthur Stuart GCMG KCSI KCVO (29 July 1860 – 1 March 1923) was an Indian Civil Servant, the first director of the Central Criminal Intelligence Department, and later a home secretary to the Government of India. A graduate of King's College, Cambridge, Harold Stuart was born in the city of York to Peter Stuart. He entered the Indian Civil Service in 1881, serving as the Under Secretary to the Government of Madras. From April 1904 till 1909, Stuart served as the head of the newly formed Central Criminal Intelligence Department, later serving as the home secretary to the Government of India and subsequently in the Executive Council.

In 1919 he was appointed as the British high commissioner to the Inter-Allied Rhineland High Commission.

== See also ==
- Stuartpuram, Indian settlement named after him
