= Stuartpuram =

- Village
- Location in Andhra Pradesh, India
- Coordinates: 15.8667°N 80.4062°E
- Country: India
- State: Andhra Pradesh
- District: Bapatla

Languages
  - Official: Telugu
- Time zone: UTC+5:30 (IST)

Stuartpuram is a village located in the Bapatla district of Andhra Pradesh in India. It is located on the Kolkata–Chennai highway.

== History ==
The village was named after Harold Stuart. Stuart approached The Salvation Army to reform the nomadic Yerukala tribe, who were labeled as a criminal tribe, by settling them down and the village was built as an establishment to reform them.

The village is known for being the birthplace of criminal "Tiger" Nageswara Rao.

== Media portrayal ==
Stuartapuram has been depicted in Telugu cinema as a mysterious hub of criminal activity in films such as Stuartpuram Police Station (1991), Stuvartpuram Dongalu (1991), and Stuartpuram (2019). Two films about "Tiger" Nageswara Rao specifically were released in 2023: Stuartpuram Donga and Tiger Nageswara Rao. That year, the village put up a banner along State Highway 48 criticizing the negative and steretyped portrayal of their community in the films.

== See also ==
- Yerukala people
