= Seetharamu =

- VCD cover
- Directed by: V. Somashekhar
- Written by: M. D. Sundar
- Produced by: A. L. Abbaiah Naidu
- Starring: Shankar Nag; Manjula; Thoogudeepa Srinivas
- Cinematography: P. Devaraj
- Edited by: P. Bhakthavathsalam
- Music by: Satyam
- Release date: 30 April 1979
- Running time: 135 minutes
- Country: India
- Language: Kannada

Seetharamu is a 1979 Indian Kannada-language science fiction action film directed by V. Somashekhar. The film stars Shankar Nag, Manjula and Thoogudeepa Srinivas. It is based on a science fiction plot involving a brain transplant. The film was remade in Telugu as Seethe Ramudaithe, again starring Shankar Nag, and in Hindi in 1995 as Diya Aur Toofan.

== Plot ==
Ramu (Shankar Nag), an artists arrives to his friend's (Dr. Dayal) village. Dr. Dayal is a researcher. After finding his house strange, Ramu decides to stay elsewhere in another guest house which belongs to Naganna (Thougudeepa Srinivas). He befriends Seetha, his neighbor. Dayal advises him to marry soon.

Soon, Ramu falls for Seetha, and she reciprocates as well. One night, he sees Bhairava, Dayal's servant, carrying a dead body to Dayal's house. It is then revealed that Dayal is working on a research to bring back people from being dead.

Seetha's father approves Ramu's request to marry her.

In a fateful encounter, when cruel men try to gang rape her, Ramu arrives and saves her after which he cuts off their mustaches. On the day of Ramu and Seetha's marriage, Ramu is found dead in his house by his friend Dayal. Seetha flees to see him but she trips from the stairs and falls unconscious. When the police arrive to examine Ramu's body, he is nowhere to be found. After Dayal returns home, his servant says that, he retrieved Ramu's body and kept it in his lab. Dayal operates on him and removes his brain and keeps in a deep freezer for research purposes.

Elsewhere, Seetha is devastated about Ramu's death. Soon, Seetha's father also dies due to heart attack, unable to see his daughter's suffering. Seetha loses her mental state, due to depression. Dr Dayal tries his best to convince her that Ramu is no more. But she attempts to commit suicide, and falls to the water from a great height. After rescuing her, Dayal performs brain transplant to replace Seetha's brain with that of Ramu, a procedure he has never experimented before. After several weeks, Seetha wakes up and is shockingly seen to be behaving like Ramu. She also reveals what happened that night: When Ramu was getting ready on his marriage day, a killer (Prabhakar) arrives and attacks him, who says that Muddanna, Linganna, Giriyappa, and Naganna bribed him to attack Ramu, to exact revenge. But the killer, stabs him and kills him.

Seetha (aka Seetharamu) decides to take revenge on the culprits. Seetha begins to act as Ramu, thus people think that the dead Ramu's spirit has possessed her. She mimics all of Ramu's actions. Ramu eventually takes revenge cleverly on all the 4 culprits and surrenders to the police.

== Cast ==
- Shankar Nag as Ramu
- Manjula as Seetha
- Thoogudeepa Srinivas
- Kanchana
- Dinesh
- Sundar Krishna Urs as Dr. Dayal
- Shakti Prasad
- Arikesari
- Prabhakar
- B. Jaya

== Soundtrack ==
The music was composed by Satyam, with lyrics by Chi Udayashankar. The song Ee Roopave Nannee Baalina was previously used by Satyam for the 1978 Telugu movie Annadammula Savaal, which was a remake of the 1977 Kannada film Sahodarara Savaal. The song "Onde Ondu Aasayu" became popular and was remixed in the 2006 film Jackpot.

Track listing
No.	Title	Lyrics	Singer(s)	Length
1.	"Hoovina Sogasu Ninagagi"	Chi. Udaya Shankar	S. P. Balasubrahmanyam, S. Janaki
2.	"Onde Ondu Aseyu"	Chi. Udaya Shankar	S. P. Balasubrahmanyam, S. Janaki
3.	"Bande Baruthane Rama"	Chi. Udaya Shankar	S. Janaki
4.	"Ee Roopave Nannee Baalina"	Chi. Udaya Shankar	S. P. Balasubrahmanyam, S. Janaki

== Reception ==
The film was a success and made Shankar Nag popular among the masses.
