= Palegara =

- Directed by: N. Omprakash Rao
- Screenplay by: N. Omprakash Rao
- Produced by: S. V. S. Chinni; M. K. Prakash
- Starring: Ambareesh; Khushbu; Nirosha; Srikanya
- Cinematography: Sundarnath Suvarna; Mahendra Chittibabu; Manohar; Ramu
- Edited by: R. Janardhan
- Music by: Hamsalekha
- Production company: Sri Sai Subhadra Films
- Release date: 23 August 1996
- Country: India
- Language: Kannada

Palegara is a 1996 Indian Kannada-language film, directed by N. Omprakash Rao and produced by S. V. S. Chinni and M. K. Prakash. The film stars Ambareesh, Khushbu, Nirosha and Srikanya. The film has musical score by Hamsalekha.

== Cast ==
- Ambareesh
- Khushbu
- Nirosha
- Srikanya
- Anandaraj
- Dheerendra Gopal
- Maanu
- Rajanand
- Sadashiva Brahmavar
- Madhukar
- Shobhraj
- Venki
- Dharanendraiah
- Gangadhar
- Sarigama Viji
- Tennis Krishna
- Shani Mahadevappa
- B. V. Radha
- Poojitha
- Anuja
- Vanishree
- Jyothi
- Prema
- Vajramuni in guest appearance

== Soundtrack ==
Palegara

Soundtrack album by Naadabrahma Hamsalekha
- Released: 1996
- Recorded: 1996
- Genre: Feature film soundtrack

The music was composed by Naadabrahma Hamsalekha.

No.	Song	Singers	Lyrics	Length (m:ss)
1	"Anju Mallige"	Mano, S. Janaki	Hamsalekha	04:53
2	"Edu Nannooru"	S. P. Balasubrahmanyam	Hamsalekha	05:01
3	"Kamanna Makkalu"	S. P. Balasubrahmanyam, Suma Shastri	Hamsalekha	05:15
4	"Ondu Hudugi"	Mano, S. Janaki	Hamsalekha	04:40
5	"Roma Roma"	Mano, S. Janaki	Hamsalekha	04:36
