= Maanu (actor) =

Indian actor

- Guttigeri Manappa
- Born: Guttigeri Manappa; Shimoga, Karnataka, India
- Died: 16 July 1996; Karnataka, India
- Occupations: Actor; television director; author
- Spouse: Asha (m. 1975)
- Children: 2

Guttigeri Manappa (died 16 July 1996), known mononymously as Maanu, was an Indian actor, television director and author. He was most noted for his work in Kannada cinema. For his performance in Tabbaliyu Neenade Magane (1977), he received the Filmfare Award for Best Actor – Kannada at the 25th Filmfare Awards South.

== Biography ==
Maanu hailed from Kuppalli, a village in Shimoga district of Karnataka. He obtained his bachelor of arts degree from Sahyadri College in Shimoga. During this time, he also performed in amateur theatre. He obtained a master's degree from University of Mysore, and began working as a reader at a private educational institution. Maanu married the daughter of a family friend, Asha, in 1975, and the couple have two children. He was a part of Benaka theatre troupe and performed in plays such as Sattavara Neralu.

Maanu's career in films began when he appeared in Ondu Premada Kathe (1977), written by B. R. Lakshmana Rao. He would also become a frequent collaborator of director Baraguru Ramachandrappa, and appeared in his films, Surya (1987) and Karadipura (1996) among others. The latter was his last film. In addition to acting, Guttigeri Manappa authored books such as Lingana Kudi and Geleyara Geleya Ambareesh, a biographical account of actor Ambareesh. He also directed a television adaptation of Kuvempu's Malenadina Chitragalu, a 13-part series, which was telecast of DD Chandana.

Maanu died due to injuries sustained from a car crash on the night of 16 July 1996 near Arsikere, en route to Shimoga, to address a gathering of the Nava Nirmana Vedike banner, of Karnataka's former Chief Minister Ramakrishna Hegde.

== Filmography ==
- Ondu Premada Kathe (1977)...Kamalesh Nayar
- Lakshmi Nivasa (1977)
- Manassinanthe Mangalya (1977)
- Tabbaliyu Neenade Magane (1977)...Kalingegowda
- Havina Hejje (1978)
- Sandharbha (1978)
- Parasangada Gendethimma (1978)
- Sadananda (1979)
- Kaadu Kudure (1979)...Huligonda
- Atthege Thakka Sose (1979)
- Asadhya Aliya (1979)...Shekhar
- Arivu (1979)
- Doddamane Estate (1980)
- Anurakte (1980)
- Manku Thimma (1980)
- Kappu Kola (1980)
- Rajeshwari (1981)
- Sangeetha (1981)
- Havina Hede (1981)
- Bhagyada Belaku (1981)
- Balu Bangara (1981)
- Avali Javali (1981)
- Prema Mathsara (1982)
- Karmika Kallanalla (1982)
- Gandharvagiri (1983)
- Chandi Chamundi (1983)
- Ramapurada Ravana (1984)
- Police Papanna (1984)
- Khaidi (1984)
- Kaliyuga (1984)
- Benki Birugali (1984)...Ramesh
- Thayi Thande (1985)
- Rasthe Raja (1986)
- Henne Ninagenu Bandhana (1986)
- Bete (1986)
- Beralge Koral (1987)
- Surya (1987)
- Shiva Bhaktha Markandeya (1987)
- Mr. Raja (1987)
- Suprabhatha (1988)...Sundareshwar
- Sahasa Veera (1988)
- Kote (1988)
- Bhoomi Thayane (1988)
- Sri Mylara Linga (1989)
- Singari Bangari (1989)
- Hrudaya Geethe (1989)
- Sididedda Gandu (1990)
- Ranabheri (1990)
- Prathap (1990)
- Veerappan (1991)
- SP Bhargavi (1991)
- Undu Hoda Kondu Hoda (1992)...Dundappa
- Entede Bhanta (1992)
- Chithralekha (1992)
- Kempaiah IPS (1993)
- Bhagavan Sri Saibaba (1993)
- Baa Nalle Madhuchandrake (1993)...Preethi's father
- Samrat (1994)...Chief Minister
- Palegara (1996)
- Karadipura (1996)
