= Vijay Vikram =

- VCD cover
- Directed by: V. Somashekhar
- Written by: Chi. Udaya Shankar
- Screenplay by: M. D. Sundar
- Story by: M. D. Sundar
- Produced by: A. R. Raju
- Starring: Vishnuvardhan; Jayanthi; Deepa; Pramila Joshai
- Cinematography: S. V. Srikanth
- Edited by: P. Venkateshwara Rao
- Music by: Satyam
- Production company: Ajantha Combines
- Distributed by: Ajantha Combines
- Release date: 6 September 1979
- Running time: 151 min
- Country: India
- Language: Kannada

Vijay Vikram is a 1979 Indian Kannada-language film, directed by V. Somashekhar and produced by A. R. Raju. The film stars Vishnuvardhan, Jayanthi, Deepa and Pramila Joshai.

== Plot ==
Vikram, a landlord rapes Jayanthi, the daughter of his estate manager. Jayanthi gets pregnant and gives birth to a son who grows up to be Vijay. Jayanti uses her son to take revenge on Vikram. Towards the end Vikram learns that Vijay is his own son and regrets his past deeds. But other bad people create problems for the family. Vikram dies in the end.

== Cast ==
- Vishnuvardhan as Vikram and Vijay
- Jayanthi
- Deepa
- Pramila Joshai
- Ashalatha
- B. Jayashree
- Vijayalakshmi
- Uma
- Leelavathi
- Baby Rekha
- Kamini Bhatiya
- Dwarakish
- K. S. Ashwath
- Chethan Ramarao
- Thoogudeepa Srinivas as Daku Badri
- Shakti Prasad
- Prabhakar as Chengappa
- Bheemaraj
- S. Rajanna
- Musuri Krishnamurthy
- Hanumanthachar
- Comedian Guggu
- Thipatur Siddaramaiah
- Kunigal Ramanath
