= Jayamala =

Indian actress and politician (born 1959)

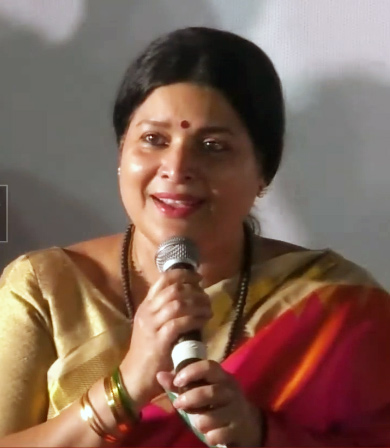
- Jayamala in 2020

Minister of Women & Child development and empowerment of differently abled & senior citizens Government of Karnataka
- In office 6 June 2018 – 8 July 2019
- Preceded by: Umashree
- Succeeded by: Shashikala Annasaheb Jolle

Minister for Kannada and Culture, and Information and Public Relations Government of Karnataka
- In office 6 June 2018 – 8 July 2019
- Preceded by: Umashree
- Succeeded by: C. T. Ravi

Leader of the Upper House Karnataka Legislative Council
- In office 24 June 2018 – 20 August 2019
- Preceded by: G. Parameshwara
- Succeeded by: Kota Srinivas Poojary

Member of the Karnataka Legislative Council
- In office 1 July 2014 – 30 June 2020

President, Karnataka Film Chamber of Commerce
- In office 29 June 2008 – May 2010
- Succeeded by: Basant Kumar Patil

Personal details
- Born: 28 February 1959 (age 67) Mangalore
- Party: Indian National Congress
- Spouses: Tiger Prabhakar (m. 1985; div. 1994) H.M. Ramachandra (m. 1998)
- Children: 1
- Profession: Actress; politician

Jayamala (born 28 February 1959) is an Indian actress and politician. She served as the Minister for Women and Child Development and Empowerment of Differently Abled and Senior Citizens in the Government of Karnataka, by virtue of being a member of the Karnataka Legislative Council.

As an actress, she worked predominantly in Kannada films apart from all major South Indian languages. Her popular films include Premada Kanike, Shankar Guru, Antha and Chandi Chamundi among several others. She has produced and acted in the award-winning Thaayi Saheba.

== Personal life ==
Jayamala was born to a Tulu speaking Billava family in Mangalore. Her father G. Omaiah was an agriculturist and mother Kamalamma, a homemaker. She has six sisters and a brother. They moved to Chikmagalur in 1963 after being displaced due to the harbour work in Panambur.

She was first married to Kannada film actor Tiger Prabhakar and the couple had a daughter Soundarya, a popular actress in her own right. After her divorce she married cinematographer H. M. Ramachandra.

== Film career ==
Jayamala has acted in several movies mainly in Kannada. Jayamala was the most glamorous heroine of Kannada cinema during the early 1980s. She started her career as a Rajkumar heroine and after a string of successful movies with him went on to star opposite all the top heroes of Sandalwood, With Anant Nag, she has acted in romantic movies as Janma Janmada Anubandha and Premave Baalina Belaku. With Vishnuvardhan, she starred in multi-starrer pot-boilers like Hanthakana Sanchu, Naga Kala Bhairava and Sididedda Sahodara. Her pairing with Ambareesh, started with the cult classic Antha where she played the tragic role of a cabaret dancer who is his sister and then went on to become his heroine in several movies like Ajith, Prema Matsara and Khadeema Kallaru. Her pairing with Shankar Nag in many movies also proved successful, including the heroine-oriented Chandi Chamundi that made her a household name as an action heroine.

Her last successful pairing was with Prabhakar, (who incidentally had played her brother in Chandi Chamundi) whom she married in 1985 after which she quit films. Interestingly Jayamala and top heroine Aarathi costarred in nine films with Jayamala's glamour quotient complementing Aarathi's simple-girl appeal.

Her first production venture Thaayi Saheba was directed by Girish Kasaravalli and won a National award. Jayamala received a special jury award for her performance in the film. Jayamala created history of sorts when she became the only actress in the Indian film industry to be conferred a doctorate for writing a thesis. Her thesis was on the rehabilitation of rural woman in Karnataka and required her to tour Karnataka and also scrutinise several documents. The Doctorate was conferred by the Bangalore University on 18 January 2008 and presented by former President Dr A P J Abdul Kalam.

== Controversy ==
She was at the center of a controversy when she claimed that she touched the Lord Ayyappa idol in Sabarimala during the shooting of Tamil movie titled 'Nambinar Keduvathillai'. Women from the age 10–50 are banned from entering Sabarimala temple. It created a furor in India and led to ideological warfare in Indian media and courts. It was Mr V Rajendran who is currently the Kerala state committee member of Bharatiya Janata Party who filed the petition against her in Ranni court. Jayamala has said she regretted her action, but clarified that she was pushed into the shrine by a crowd of devotees. Rajendran insisted that it is impossible to touch as the shrine is located far inside the Garbhagriha. The Supreme Priest of Sabarimala Kantararu Maheshwararu had dismissed the actress's statement as a figment of her imagination.

== Filmography ==
=== Kannada films ===
Year	Film	Role	Note(s)
1974	Bhootayyana Maga Ayyu		Debut in supporting role
1974	Yaaru Hitavaru		
1975	Daari Tappida Maga	Princess of Bundelpur	
1975	Thrimurthy	Prema	
1976	Premada Kanike	Kumudha	
1976	Badavara Bandhu	Susheela	
1977	Giri Kanye	Cheluvi	
1977	Babruvahana	Subhadra	
1978	Shankar Guru	Nalini	
1979	Khandavideko Mamsavideko		
1979	Savalige Saval		
1979	Madhu Chandra	Chandrika/ Kammu	
1980	Hanthakana Sanchu	Aparna	
1980	Janma Janmada Anubandha	Malathi	
1980	Nammammana Sose		
1980	Akhanda Brahmacharigalu		
1980	Kappu Kola	Renuka	
1981	Antha	Shobha	Special appearance
1981	Bhagyada Belaku		
1981	Bhaari Bharjari Bete	Leela	
1981	Muniyana Madari		
1981	Naga Kala Bhairava	Sudha	
1981	Sangeetha		
1981	Number 5 Ekka		
1982	Ajith		
1982	Khadeema Kallaru	Usha	
1982	Prema Matsara	Latha	
1982	Raga Thala		
1982	Muttinantha Attige		
1982	Shankar Sundar		
1982	Pedda Gedda		
1983	Chandi Chamundi	Parvati	
1983	Geluvu Nannade	Shanti	
1983	Hosa Theerpu	Radha	
1983	Nyaya Gedditu	Rajini	
1983	Prema Yuddha		
1983	Sididedda Sahodara	Geetha	
1983	Thirugu Baana		Guest appearance
1984	Bedaru Bombe		
1984	Benki Birugali	Jyothi	
1984	Gandu Bherunda	Myna	
1984	Hosa Ithihaasa		
1984	Huliyada Kala		
1984	Jiddu		
1984	Vigneshwarana Vahana	Vimala	
1984	Nagabekamma Nagabeku		
1984	Onti Dhwani		
1984	Premave Balina Belaku	Shantha	
1984	Raktha Thilaka	Radha	
1984	Thaayi Naadu		
1985	Pralaya Rudra		
1995	Gadibidi Aliya		
1996	Geluvina Saradara		
1996	Nirbandha		
1997	Thaayi Saheba	Narmada	National Film Special Jury Award; Karnataka State Film Award for Best Actress; Filmfare Award for Best Actress – Kannada
2004	Rowdy Aliya	Malini Devi	
2008	Navashakthi Vaibhava	Mookambika	

=== Tamil ===
1. Oru Kodiyil Iru Malargal (1976)
2. Jamboo (1980)
3. Bhama Rukmani (1980)
4. Andru Muthal Indru Varai (1981)
5. Kadavulin Theerpu (1981)
6. Kalthoon (1981)
7. Meendum Santhippom (1981)
8. Asthivaram (1982)
9. Kann Sivanthaal Mann Sivakkum (1983) as Valli
10. Thalaimagan (1983)
11. Pozhuthu Vidinchachu (1984)
12. Padikkadha Pannaiyar (1985)
13. Nambinar Keduvathillai (1986)
14. Uruvam (1991)
15. En Pondatti Nallava (1995) as Mayilu

=== Malayalam: Credited as Jayanthi ===
1. Devalokam (Unreleased)
2. Makara Vilakku (1980)
3. Oridathoru Phayalvaan (1981) as Chakkara
4. Sindoora Sandhyakku Mounam (1982)
5. Kadamba (1983)
6. Rishi (1992)

=== Tulu ===
1. Kaasdaye Kandani (1974)
2. Yaan Sanyasi Aaape (1974)
3. Yer Malthina Thappu (1974)
4. Bayya Mallige (1974)

=== Telugu ===
1. Bhale Ramudu (1984) as Asha
2. Rakshasudu (1986)
