= Atthege Thakka Sose =

- Directed by: Y. R. Swamy
- Written by: Narendra Babu (dialogues)
- Screenplay by: Anna Saheb
- Story by: Anna Saheb
- Produced by: S. D. Ankalagi; B. H. Chandannavar; Surendra Ingale; M. G. Hublikar
- Starring: Maanu; Rekha Rao; Gangadhar; Srilalitha
- Cinematography: R. Madhusudan
- Edited by: S. P. N. Krishna
- Music by: M. Ranga Rao
- Production company: Bhuvaneshwari Art Productions
- Distributed by: Bhuvaneshwari Art Productions
- Release date: 1 May 1979
- Running time: 127 min
- Country: India
- Language: Kannada

Atthege Thakka Sose is a 1979 Indian Kannada-language film, directed by Y. R. Swamy and produced by S. D. Ankalagi, B. H. Chandannavar, Surendra Ingale and M. G. Hublikar. The film stars Maanu, Rekha Rao, Gangadhar and Srilalitha. The film has musical score by M. Ranga Rao.

== Cast ==
- Maanu
- Rekha Rao
- Gangadhar
- Srilalitha
- Leelavathi
- Pramila Joshai
- Kamini Bhatiya
- Dheerendra Gopal
- B. K. Shankar
- Sadashiva Brahmavar
- Kumaraswamy
- Hanumanthachar
- Malkoji Rao
- Chandannavar
- Surendra Ingale
- Hanumantha Biradar
- Jr. Narasimharaju
- Master Rajesh
- Master Ganesh
- Rekha Mavinakurve
- Lalithamma
- Umasarathi
- Vanajakshi

== Soundtrack ==
The music was composed by M. Ranga Rao with lyrics for the soundtrack written by R. N. Jayagopal, Vijaya Naarasimha and Doddarangegowda.

No.	Song	Singers	Lyrics	Length (m:ss)
1	"Baa Hoo Thotakke"	S. Janaki	R. N. Jayagopal	03:46
2	"Karunaada"	S. Janaki	R. N. Jayagopal	04:17
3	"Madhu Yedurali"	S. Janaki	R. N. Jayagopal	04:13
4	"Neene Nanna"	S. P. Balasubrahmanyam, S. Janaki	Vijaya Narasimha	04:29
