= V. Somashekhar =

Indian film director, producer and screenwriter

- ವೆಂಕಟಪ್ಪ ಸೋಮಶೇಖರ್
- Born: Venkatappa Somashekhar; 27 July 1937; Chikkanahalli, Bangalore Rural district, Kingdom of Mysore, British India
- Died: 22 August 2003 (aged 66); Bangalore, India
- Other name: V. Somasekharan
- Occupations: Film director, producer, screenwriter
- Spouse: Gowramma
- Children: 3
- Awards: Puttanna Kanagal Award (2001)

Venkatappa Somashekhar (27 July 1937 – 22 August 2003) was an Indian film director, producer and screenwriter in Kannada and Malayalam cinema. In 40 years of his career as a director, he directed 49 films, including commercial successes such as Premada Kanike (1976), Shankar Guru (1978), Seetharamu (1979), Chakravyuha (1983), and Prathap (1990). Widely known for action-oriented movies, he was much sought as a hit-machine.

Following his directorial career, he worked as the President of Kannada Film Directors Association. Recognizing his contribution to Kannada cinema, he was awarded the Puttanna Kanagal Award in 2001.

== Career ==
In 1955, in Madras (now Chennai), at the age of 18, Somashekhar entered cinema hoping to become an actor and started as a clapperboard operator. He then appeared in uncredited film roles before working as a dubbing artist. Following this, he worked as an assistant director to popular film directors at the time, R. Nagendra Rao, N. G. Rajan, Y. R. Swamy, Ramamurthy and Babu Rao.

Actor Dr. Rajkumar was impressed by Somashekhar's work in Choori Chikkanna (1969), and urged to him direct films independently. Somashekhar started out with Rajkumar's 1974 film Bangaarada Panjara. The film was a commercial success. Collaborating with Rajkumar, he followed this up with other hit films such as Premada Kanike (1976), Shankar Guru (1978), Thayige Thakka Maga (1978), Havina Hede (1981) and Parashuram (1989).

Somashekhar was instrumental in building the career of Shankar Nag as an action hero, directing him in films such as Seetharamu (1979), Aarada Gaaya (1980) and Devara Aata (1981). He directed Ambareesh in the 1983 film Chakravyuha for Eshwari Productions, after their previous venture Ajith ran well. Chakravyuha, a commercial success, was remade in Hindi as Inquilaab, and revived the latter's career following a series of failures. Ambareesh went on to do a string of films with Somashekhar, namely Gajendra, Chaduranga, Deverelliddaane, Mrugaalaya, Bete, Mr Raja and Bedi, each having a tone of a rebel hero fighting against the corrupt, earning the sobriquet "Rebel Star."

With Vishnuvardhan, Somashekhar worked in Kalinga (1980) and Chanakya (1984). Other popular films directed by Somashekhar include Point Parimala (1980), Ranaranga (1988) and S. P. Bhargavi (1981). In the late 1980s, he floated a production company, Vijaya Shekhar Productions with another director Vijay. They collaborated with writer C. V. Shivashankar and made a string of successful films together.

== Final years and death ==
Following his film career as a director after retiring in 1992, Somashekhar associated himself with the Kannada Film Directors Association, serving as its president and as a working committee member of the Karnataka Film Chamber of Commerce.

Recognizing his contribution to Kannada cinema, he was awarded the Puttanna Kanagal Award in 2001, for 1999–2000.

He took to agriculture in the following years and also suffered from renal disorder during this time. He died on 22 August 2003, at a hospital in St. John's Medical College, Bangalore.

== Filmography ==
Year	Film	Language	Credited as			Notes
Year	Film	Language	Director	Producer	Screenwriter	Notes
1974	Bangaarada Panjara	Kannada	Yes		Yes	
1976	Premada Kanike	Kannada	Yes			Won, Karnataka State Film Award for Third Best Film
1978	Shankar Guru	Kannada	Yes			
1978	Thayige Thakka Maga	Kannada	Yes			
1979	Seetharamu	Kannada	Yes			
1979	Vijay Vikram	Kannada	Yes			
1980	Point Parimala	Kannada	Yes			
1980	Kaalinga	Kannada	Yes			
1980	Rama Parashurama	Kannada		Yes		
1980	Aarada Gaaya	Kannada	Yes	Yes		
1981	Havina Hede	Kannada	Yes			
1981	Devara Aata	Kannada	Yes	Yes		
1982	Andada Aramane	Kannada	Yes			
1982	Mareyalagada Kathe	Kannada	Yes			
1982	Ajith	Kannada	Yes			
1983	Chandi Chamundi	Kannada	Yes			
1983	Chakravyuha	Kannada	Yes			
1984	Gajendra	Kannada	Yes	Yes		
1984	Premigala Saval	Kannada	Yes			
1984	Chanakya	Kannada	Yes			
1985	Njangal Jayikkum Njangal Bharikum	Malayalam	Yes			
1985	Chaduranga	Kannada	Yes			
1985	Devarelliddane	Kannada	Yes	Yes		also wrote story
1986	Mrugaalaya	Kannada	Yes		Yes	
1986	Ee Jeeva Ninagagi	Kannada	Yes			
1986	Aparadhi Nanalla	Kannada	Yes			
1986	Bete	Kannada	Yes	Yes	Yes	
1986	Vishwaroopa	Kannada	Yes			
1987	Mr. Raja	Kannada	Yes		Yes	
1987	Bedi	Kannada	Yes	Yes	Yes	
1987	Verukal Thedi	Malayalam	Yes			
1988	Kirathaka	Kannada	Yes			
1988	Vijaya Khadga	Kannada	Yes			
1988	Ranaranga	Kannada	Yes		Yes	
1989	Gandandre Gandu	Kannada	Yes			
1989	Onti Salaga	Kannada	Yes		Yes	
1989	Parashuram	Kannada	Yes		Yes	
1990	Ranabheri	Kannada	Yes		Yes	
1990	Prathap	Kannada	Yes	Yes	Yes	also wrote story
1991	Varagala Bete	Kannada		Yes		also wrote story
1991	S. P. Bhargavi	Kannada	Yes	Yes	Yes	also wrote story
1992	Chuvanna Kaipathi	Malayalam	Yes			
1992	Chitralekha	Kannada	Yes	Yes	Yes	also wrote story
1993	Sarkarakke Saval	Kannada	Yes			
1993	Kempaiah IPS	Kannada	Yes		Yes	also wrote story
1997	Gandede Bhaira	Kannada	Yes			
