= Achyuth =

Telugu actor

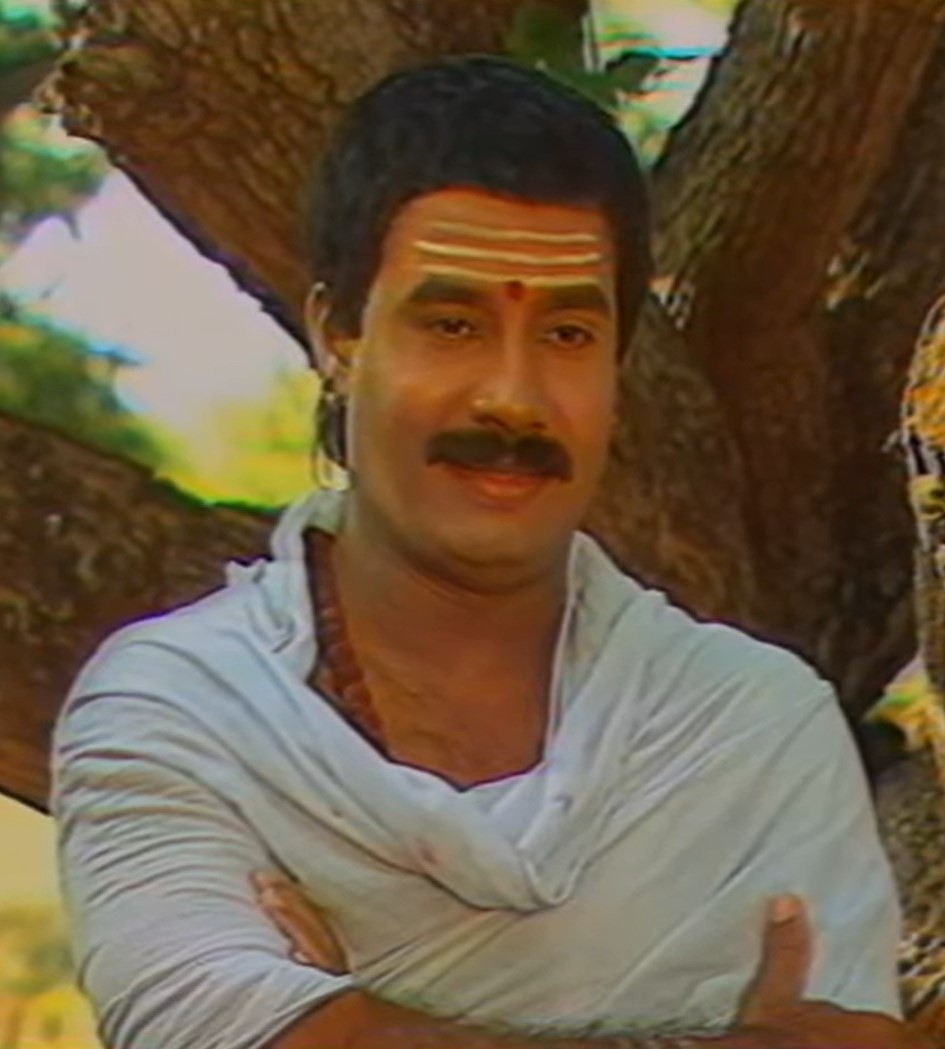
- Achyuth in a scene from the DD Yadagiri's television series Bhatruhari Janmavruthantham
- Born: Kunapareddy Achyuta Vara Prasad; 1960; Machilipatnam, Andhra Pradesh, India
- Died: 26 December 2002 (aged 41 or 42); Hyderabad, Andhra Pradesh, India
- Occupation: Actor
- Years active: 1990s–2002
- Spouse: Ramadevi
- Children: Sai Sujatha; Sai Sivani
- Parents: Kunapareddy Ramarao (father); Kunapareddy Sujatha (mother)

Kunapareddy Achyutha Vara Prasad, better known as Achyuth (1960 – 26 December 2002) was an Indian actor who primarily worked in Telugu films and television. He acted in over 50 films and 50 television shows. His accolades include five Nandi Awards. He is notable for his supporting roles in films including Thammudu and Bavagaru Bagunnara? He played lead roles in the popular Telugu TV serials Sthree, Seethapathi, Antharangalu and Anveshitha.

== Personal life ==
Achyuth was born in Machilipatnam, Krishna District of Andhra Pradesh to Kunapareddy Rama Rao and Kunapareddy Sujatha. He had two brothers and two younger sisters. He was married to Ramadevi and had two daughters, Sai Sujatha and Sai Sivani.

== Acting career ==
Achyuth made his debut as an actor with the film Taj Mahal, but the first release was Mangalya Balam. He was quite popular with serials like Himabindu, Sthree, Seethapathi, Kranthi Rekha, Antarangalu, and Anveshitha.

He acted with stars including ANR, Mammootty, Chiranjeevi, Balakrishna, Venkatesh, Pawan Kalyan, Jr. NTR, Mahesh Babu. He acted with Varsha in Thammudu, Vasu, and Simharasi.

== Producer ==
He produced ANR and Krishna in serials along with Pradeep, Ashok, and Kadambari Kiran.

== Political views ==
He supported the then chief minister N. Chandrababu Naidu in campaigning for TDP.

== Filmography ==
Year	Film	Role	Notes
1991	Prema Entha Madhuram	Shyam Sunder	
1992	Swati Kiranam	Radha Krishna	
1992	Dabbu Bhale Jabbu		
1992	Akka Mogudu	Police Inspector	
1993	Jeevana Vedam		
1993	Aadivaram Amavasya	Raja	
1994	Aavesam	Police officer	
1995	Taj Mahal	Raja	
1997	Hitler	Collector	
1997	College Student	Anand	
1997	Gokulamlo Seeta	Sriram	
1998	Bavagaru Bagunnara?	Venkat	
1998	Eshwar Alla		
1998	Yuvaratna Raana	Kiran	
1998	Tholi Prema	Anil	
1999	Thammudu	Chakri	
1999	Harischandraa	Joseph	
2000	Kalisundam Raa	Bhaskar Rao	
2000	Oke Maata		
2000	Ganapathi		
2000	Rayalaseema Ramanna Chowdary	Raghu	
2000	Uncle	Ram Mohan	
2001	Narasimha Naidu	Tirumala Naidu	
2001	Simharasi	Hari Prasad	
2001	Kouravudu	Rahul	
2001	Eduruleni Manishi	Bhavani's husband	
2001	Murari	Sabari's husband	Guest appearance
2001	Daddy	Ramesh	
2002	Allari Ramudu	Ramu's father	
2002	Vasu	Vignesh	
2003	Okkadu	Siva	Posthumous release
2003	Indiramma		Posthumous release

=== Television ===
- Himabindu
- Sthree
- Sthree Parvam
- Seethapathi
- Kranthi Rekha
- Antharangalu
- Anveshitha (1997–99)
- Anubandham
- Prathibimbalu

== Death ==
Achyuth died of a heart attack on 26 December 2002.
