= Trichinopoly District =

District of the Madras Presidency of British India

Coordinates: 10°47′N 78°41′E

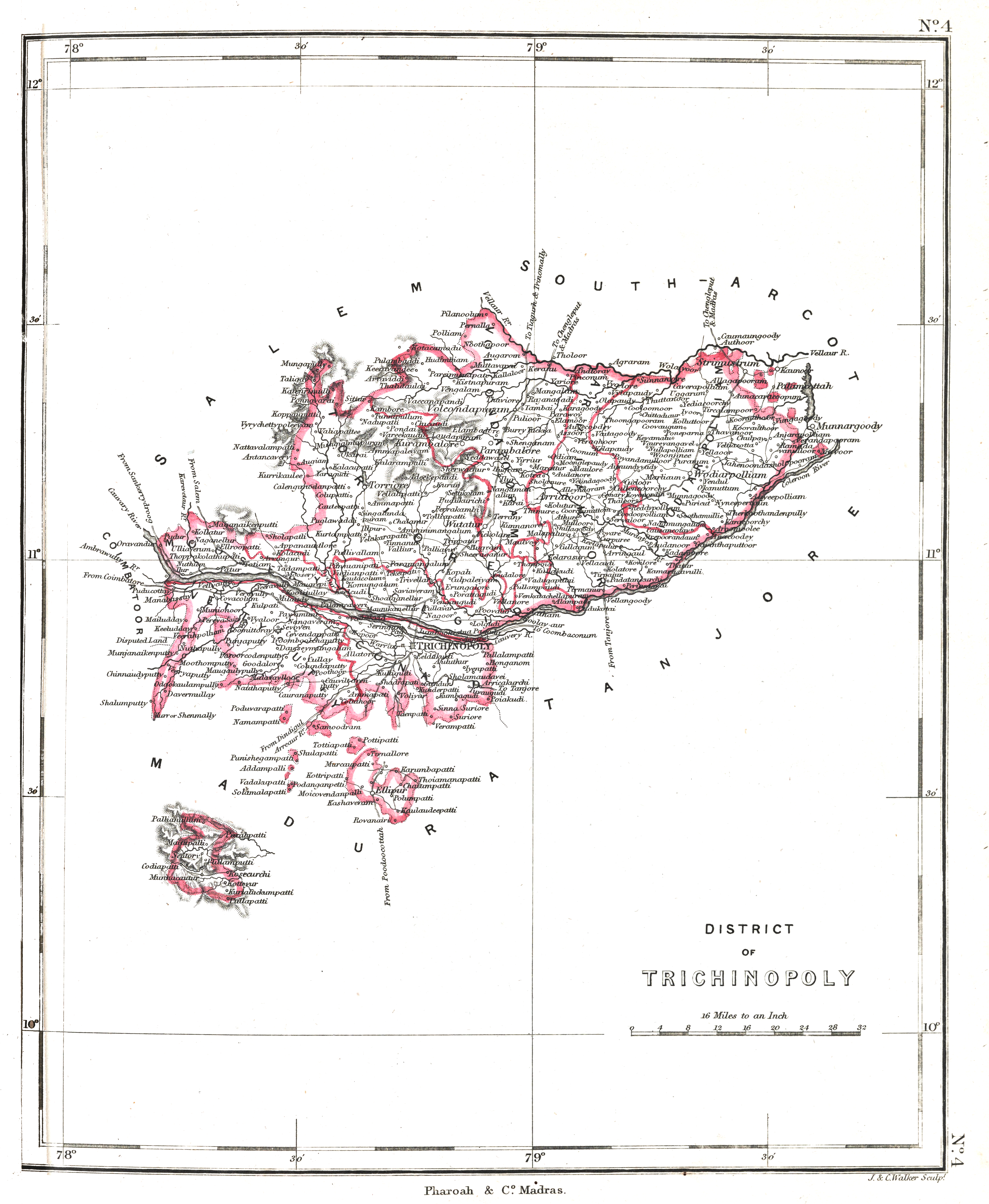
Trichinopoly District 1854

The Trichinopoly district was a district of the erstwhile Madras Presidency of British India. It covered the present-day districts of Tiruchirappalli, Karur, Ariyalur and Perambalur in the Indian state of Tamil Nadu. The administrative headquarters was the town of Trichinopoly, Trichy or Tiruchi, now known as Tiruchirappalli. The district covered an area of 2,632 square miles (6,820 km^{2}) in 1907. It was bound by the districts of South Arcot to the north, Salem to the west, Coimbatore to the west and north-west, Tanjore to the east and Madurai to the south. The princely state of Pudukkottai remained within the jurisdiction of Trichinopoly district from 1865 to 1947.

Trichinopoly was one of the oldest inhabited regions in South India. Archaeological excavations have revealed Stone Age sites. The town of Uraiyur, the capital of the Early Cholas, was a part of Trichinopoly district. The region was annexed to Madras Presidency in the late 18th century and a separate district was created in 1801. When India became independent in 1947, the name of the district was de-Anglicized as Tiruchirapalli.

== History ==
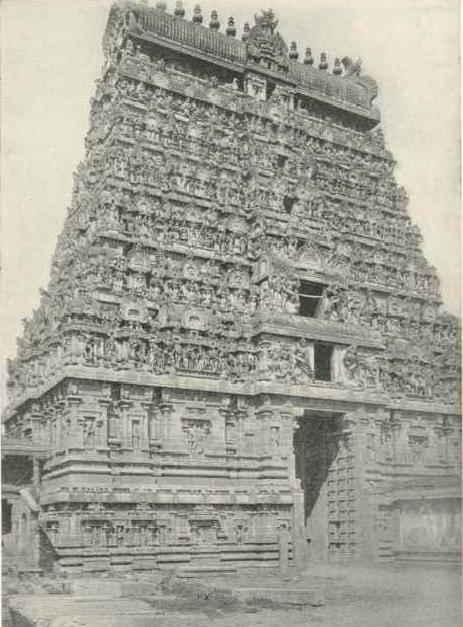
The main gopura of Sri Ranganathaswamy Temple, Srirangam

Stone Age implements discovered in Trichinopoly district indicate that it might have been inhabited as early as the 3rd millennium BC. During the Sangam Age, Trichinopoly was the site of Uraiyur, the Early Chola capital. At about the same time, the western part of the district was under the rule of the Cheras under whom Musiri flourished as an important riverine port indulging in trade with Rome and Egypt. Trichinopoly was a part of the kingdom of the Pallavas who laid the foundation of the Rockfort Uchchi Pillaiyar temple and left their marks in the numerous other temples in and around Trichy town. After the demise of the Pallavas, the district was ruled by the Medieval and Later Cholas, Later Pandyas, Delhi Sultanate, Madurai Sultanate and the Vijayanagar kingdom. The city of Trichy served as a capital of the Madurai Nayaks who succeeded the Vijayanagar kingdom. After the Madurai Nayak kingdom fell in 1736, Trichinopoly was occupied for short periods by Chanda Sahib of the Carnatic, the Thanjavur Marathas (see siege of Trichinopoly), the French East India Company and Tipu Sultan of Mysore before it was finally conquered by the British East India Company and made a district of Madras Presidency in 1801. Trichinopoly was an important British stronghold during the Carnatic Wars and a number of skirmishes were fought there.

== Administration ==
The Trichinopoly district was constituted in 1801 with Mr. Wallace as its first Collector. As of 1907, the district had three municipalities - Karur, Srirangam and Trichinipoly - and four taluk boards - Trichinopoly, Ariyalur, Karur and Namakkal - which looked after the administration of rural areas. The Trichinopoly taluk board handled the revenue administration of Trichinopoly taluk, the Karur board of Karur and Kullittalai taluks, Ariyalur board of Udaiyarpalaiyam and Perambalur taluks and the Namakkal taluk board of Namakkal and Musiri taluks. Under the taluk boards were 23 unions: three under Trichinopoly board, six under Ariyalur, two under Karur and twelve under Namakkal.

The Trichinopoly municipality was the oldest municipality in the district, established in 1866, followed by Srirangam in 1871 and Karur in 1874.

A map of Trichinopoly district in 1907

== Sub-Divisions ==
As of 1901, Trichinopoly district was made up of seven taluks.

- Karur
- Kullittalai (930 sq. miles) - largest taluk in the district
- Musiri (667 sq. miles)
- Namakkal
- Perambalur (690 sq. miles)
- Trichinopoly (519 sq. miles)
- Udaiyarpalaiyam (777 sq. miles)

Perambalur taluk was initially a part of South Arcot district but was transferred to Trichinopoly. Namakkal taluk was transferred to Trichinopoly from Salem in 1910.

== Demographics ==
Historical population
| Year | Pop. | ±% |
|---|---|---|
| 1871 | 1,200,408 | — |
| 1881 | 1,215,033 | +1.2% |
| 1891 | 1,372,717 | +13.0% |
| 1901 | 1,444,770 | +5.2% |
Sources: Imperial Gazetter of India, Volume 24. Clarendon Press. 1908.

Trichinopoly had a population of 1,444,770 in 1901. In 1901, it was the seventh most densely populated district in the Presidency with a population density of 400 per square mile compared to the density of the Presidency which was 270 per square mile. The population of the district increased by 21 percent between 1871 and 1901.

Tamil was spoken by a majority of the populace. Telugu was spoken by 12 percent of the population and Kannada was spoken by 2 percent of the population. Around 1 percent of the population spoke Hindi. Over 93 percent of the population were Hindus, 4 percent Christians and 3 percent Muslims. Most Christians were Roman Catholics.

== Education ==
The literacy rate of Trichinopoly was higher than the average literacy rate of the Madras Presidency. According to the 1901 census, 13 percent of the male population and 0.8 percent of the female population were literate. As of 1907, there were two colleges, St. Joseph's and SPG in Trichinopoly town.

== Economy ==
As of 1907, more than three-fourths of the total population was involved in agriculture. Trichinopoly was also an important silk-weaving centre while cotton clothes were manufactured at Karur, Udaiyarpalaiyam and Perambalur. Metal utensils were manufactured at Kullittalai, Permbalur and Trichinopoly is famous for its Artificial Gems.

== Sources ==
- F. R. Hemingway (1907). Madras District Gazetteers: Trichinopoly.
