= Shanmukha Films =

- Industry: Entertainment
- Founded: 2012
- Founder: Praveen Kumar Varma
- Fate: Active
- Headquarters: Hyderabad, India
- Area served: India
- Products: Films
- Services: Film production Film distribution

Shanmukha Films is an Indian film production and distribution company which started distributing films in 2012 in the regions of Andhra Pradesh, and subsequently got involved in film production. It distributed various films including Sardaar Gabbar Singh, Express Raja, Soggade Chinni Nayana, Swamy Ra Ra, Dohchay, Mirchi and Shirdi Sai.

== History ==
Shanmukha Films was founded in 2012 by Praveen Kumar Varma. After distributing over 50 films in various regions of Andhra Pradesh and Telangana, Shanmukha Films started acquiring rights for movies. They started by acquiring Rajinikanth's movie Kabali, and acquired complete Telugu rights of film in Andhra Pradesh and Telangana.

== Filmography ==
=== As Distributors ===
Year	Film
2012	Sudigadu
2012	Shirdi Sai
2013	Iddarammayilatho
2013	Mirchi
2014	Oka Laila Kosam
2014	Romeo
2014	Sikandar
2014	Maaya
2014	Manam
2014	Race Gurram
2014	Legend

=== As Producers ===
Year	Film
2016	Kabali
