= Madhu Chandra =

- Directed by: Ramesh-Shivaram
- Written by: C. V. Shivashankar (dialogues)
- Screenplay by: M. D. Sundar
- Story by: M. D. Sundar
- Starring: Shankar Nag; Jayamala; Ramakrishna; Mamatha Shenoy
- Cinematography: B. C. Gowrishankar
- Edited by: N. B. Umashankar
- Music by: T. G. Lingappa
- Production company: T B R Productions
- Distributed by: T B R Productions
- Release date: 20 September 1979
- Running time: 116 min
- Country: India
- Language: Kannada

Madhu Chandra ( transl. Honeymoon) is a 1979 Indian Kannada-language film, directed by Ramesh-Shivaram. The film stars Shankar Nag, Jayamala, Ramakrishna and Mamatha Shenoy in lead roles. The film had musical score by T. G. Lingappa.

== Cast ==
- Shankar Nag as Madhu
- Jayamala as Chandrika / Kammu
- Ramakrishna as Racha
- Mamatha Shenoy as Ratna
- K. R. Shantharam
- Sharapanjara Iyengar
- M. S. Umesh as Hanuma
- Ashalatha as Cheluvi
- Sathyanand
- Raju
- Shanthi
