= Stuartpuram Police Station =

- Poster
- Directed by: Yandamuri Veerendranath
- Written by: M. V. S. Haranatha Rao (dialogues)
- Screenplay by: Paruchuri Brothers
- Story by: Yandamuri Veerendranath
- Produced by: K. S. Rama Rao
- Starring: Chiranjeevi; Vijayashanti; Nirosha; Sarath Kumar
- Cinematography: Lok Singh
- Edited by: Vellaiswamy
- Music by: Ilaiyaraaja
- Production companies: Creative Commercials; Saradhi Studios
- Distributed by: Geetha Arts
- Release date: 9 January 1991
- Country: India
- Language: Telugu

Stuartpuram Police Station is a 1991 Telugu-language action film written and directed by Yandamuri Veerendranath. Produced by K. S. Rama Rao starring Chiranjeevi, Vijayashanti and Nirosha, with Sarath Kumar playing the lead antagonist. The film failed at the box-office.

== Plot ==
Inspector Rana Pratap is assigned to Stuartpuram police station. Stuartpuram in Andhra Pradesh, is a notorious place devastated by colonial prejudice, burglaries, robbery, and political corruption. Rana Pratap is assigned to the shelved mystery of large-scale Jewel robbery in the village. Rana Pratap fights against this mafia and is on a mission to apprehend Mafia leader who is the mastermind behind the Jewel robbery.

== Cast ==
- Chiranjeevi as Rana Pratap
- Vijayashanti
- Nirosha
- Sarath Kumar
- Sudhakar
- Kaikala Satyanarayana
- Brahmanandam
- Kota Srinivasa Rao
- Gollapudi Maruti Rao
- Mohan Raj
- Babu Mohan
- Jyothi

== Production ==
When Ramarao wanted Veerendranath to direct Stuartpuram Police Station, he insisted on making Agni Pravesham to which Ramarao agreed. After it was made, Ramarao did not like the film, however Chiranjeevi who was impressed with the film's making agreed to work under the direction of Veerendranath.

== Soundtrack ==
The following is the track listing. The song "Balegaa Undira" is set in Pahadi, and "Zindabad" is set in Hamsanadam.

All lyrics are written by Veturi Sundararamamurthy.

No.	Title	Singers	Length
1.	"Zindabad"	S. P. Balasubrahmanyam, K. S. Chithra	4:46
2.	"Fantastic"	Mano, K. S. Chithra	5:27
3.	"Balegaa Undira"	S. P. Balasubrahmanyam, K. S. Chithra	5:03
4.	"Seethakoka Chilaka"	S. P. Balasubrahmanyam, K. S. Chitra, S. Janaki	5:12
5.	"Cheekatanti"	Mano, S. Janaki	4:56
6.	"Neethone"	S. P. Balasubrahmanyam, K. S. Chithra	5:09

== Awards ==
- Nirosha won the Nandi Special Jury Award for her performance in this film.
