= B. S. Baliga =

Indian historian, archivist

Rao Bahadur Bantwal Surendranath Baliga (1908–1958) was an Indian historian and archivist who was served as curator of the Madras Record Office (now the Tamil Nadu State Archives) from 1934 to 1958. He is credited with having revised and published new up-to-date editions of district gazetteers of Madras State.

== Early life ==
Dr. Bantwal Surendranath Baliga (popularly known as Dr B S Baliga) was born in Bantwal, a little town about 16 miles (25 km) east of Mangalore in South Canara on 11 November 1908. His father Dr. Ram Baliga was District Medical Officer of South Canara in his time (1920–30). He was also known as Benne Baliga. B.S.Baliga had his schooling in South Canara and graduated in history and economics from the Madras University. Following his graduation, Baliga moved to London for further studies and obtained an Honours Degree in History with special reference to India from the University of London followed by a PhD Degree in History from the same University in 1933. His thesis for the PhD was 'Influence of the Home Government on Land Revenue and Judicial Administration in the Presidency of Fort William in Bengal from 1807'.

== Career ==
He specialized in South Indian History and was appointed as the Probationary Curator of the Madras Record Office (now known as Tamil Nadu Archives) in August 1934. Initially working under P. Macqueen, ICS, he later succeeded him as the Curator of the Madras Record Office in 1935. During his probation period, he was deputed to the Public Record Office in London for Archival Training. This training benefited him greatly because it later stood him in good stead when he was entrusted with the care and custody of the records of the Madras Government which in terms of volume was the largest in India at that time, may indeed in the whole of East Asia. With tremendous commitment, devotion, drive, dedication and professional competence he managed the affairs of the Madras Record Office with distinction for nearly a quarter century. During the World War II, when there was a threat of Japanese attack on Madras following the fall of Singapore in 1942, Government of Madras ordered the transfer of all the records and public documents from the Record Office in Madras to Chittoor Town in the Andhra Region. Dr Baliga was in-charge of this operation. After moving all the records to Chittoor, Dr Baliga informed the Government of Madras that his office was in a state of combat readiness to assist the Government in making all the records available in the manner and measure required. The British Government, recognizing his exemplary performance, conferred on him the title of 'Rao Bahadur'. As an archivist, administrator and scholar, he was noted for his efficiency and thoroughness in assisting all the departments of the Government and other administrative agencies by supplying them the required records with detailed explanatory notes on subjects like 'Separation of Judiciary from the Executive', 'Abolition of Zamindari', 'Rural Indebtedness', 'Rural Development', etc. The notes prepared by him were noted for their brevity, lucidity and authenticity.

In 1954, the Government of India decided to update all the district gazetteers. Baliga, as head of the Madras Record Office, was given the responsibility of revising the district gazetteers of Madras state. He personally revised the Tanjore District Gazetteer, Madurai District Gazetteer, Coimbatore District Gazetteer and the South Arcot District Gazetteer.

== Death ==
Baliga died in September 1958 at the age of 49.
