= Rustum (1984 film) =

1984 film by A. Kodandarami Reddy

- Theatrical release poster
- Directed by: A. Kodandarami Reddy
- Written by: Satyanand (dialogues)
- Screenplay by: A. Kodandarami Reddy
- Story by: Girija Sri Bhagawan
- Produced by: S. P. Venkanna Babu
- Starring: Chiranjeevi; Urvashi
- Cinematography: Lok Singh
- Edited by: M. Vellaiswamy
- Music by: Chakravarthy
- Production company: Maheswari Movies
- Release date: 2 December 1984
- Running time: 143 mins
- Country: India
- Language: Telugu

Rustum is a 1984 Telugu-language action film directed by A. Kodandarami Reddy. It stars Chiranjeevi and Urvashi (in her Telugu film debut), with music composed by Chakravarthy. The film was recorded as a "Hit" at the box office.

== Plot ==
The film begins in a village where Ganga Rayudu, the village panchayat head, who judges a dispute between Musalayya and a rowdy Gangayya; Musalayya left the village under unknown circumstances and returned after fifteen years. He learns that Gangayya illegally acquired his house and farm, and he is unwilling to return the property to Musalayya hence they came to the Panchayat. Rayudu supports Gangayya and does injustice to Musalayya; having insufficient power to face Rayudu, he again leaves the village.

A newcomer, Hari enters the village, fights with Gangayya, owns his property, and does well to the village people. Village people start calling him Rustum. Hari works for the village welfare. Rayudu sets a trap to kick Hari out of the village. As a part of his trap, Rayudu gives the village headpost to Hari. Parallelly, Hari and Padma, daughter of Rayudu, falls in love, and Hari also gets closer to Brahmaiah Naidu and Parvathi, a couple that is affected by Rayudu's injustice. Once Hari is suspected as the cause of a village girl's Lakshmi pregnancy and her suicide, hence Hari is asked to leave the village. Then, even Padma suspects Hari. In the trial to prove that he is not the cause of Lakshmi's suicide, he knows that Giri, the son of Rayudu, is the main reason. Rayudu fixes up Rudrayya, the younger brother of Brahmaiah Naidu, who was just released from prison, to kill Hari.

Meanwhile, Giri goes to the city and tracks down Musalayya to discover why Hari came to the village. Giri knows the whole loop that Hari is none other than Brahmaiah Naidu's son. When he was a child, he saw Rayudu murder someone. Musalayya, Brahmaiah Naidu's servant, protects Hari and takes him to the city. Searching for his son at the same time, Brahmaiah Naidu comes to the murder spot and, as per Rayudu's wishes, fixes up Rudrayya as the murderer, even Brahmaiah Naidu also believes that Rudrayya is the murderer and hence has him arrested. Musalayya, Rudrayya, and Hari plan to punish Rayudu and do good to the village. Per their plan, Rudrayya and Hari fight as if they are opponents. But when Rayudu learns the truth from Giri, he kidnaps Hari's entire family. Knowing the truth, Padma helps Hari to expose Rayudu. After the climax fight, Hari enters as a Police Inspector and arrests Rayudu.

== Cast ==
- Chiranjeevi as Hari
- Urvashi as Padma
- Rao Gopal Rao as Ganga Rayudu
- Satyanarayana as Rudrayya
- Allu Ramalingaiah as Lingam
- Gummadi as Brahmayya Naidu
- Giribabu as Giribabu
- Nutan Prasad as Chalapathi
- Rajendra Prasad as Paper Punna Rao
- Saikumar
- Suthi Veerabhadra Rao as Chakali
- Suthi Velu as Panthulu
- Mikkilineni as Musalayya
- Bheemaraju as Ramudu
- Fight Master Raju as Pakir
- Hema Sundar as Master
- Kakarala as Dappu Eerigadu
- Mithai Chitti as Samba
- Mallikarjuna Rao as Gopayya
- Chidatala Appa Rao
- Chitti Babu
- Rallapalli
- Jagga Rao as Gangayya
- Annapurna as Parvathi
- Rajyalakshmi as Lakshmi
- Shubha as Gowri
- K. Vijaya
- Silk Smitha as item number
- Nirmalamma as Jaggamma
- Master Harish as Young Hari

== Music ==
Rustum

Film score by Chakravarthy
- Released: 1984
- Genre: Soundtrack
- Length: 22:30
- Producer: Chakravarthy

Chakravarthy chronology
Agni Gundam (1984)	Rustum (1984)	Chattamtho Poratam (1984)

Music was composed by Chakravarthy. Lyrics written by Veturi.

S.No	Song title	Singers	length
1	"Yelaa Vunnadhamma"	S. P. Balasubrahmanyam, P. Susheela	4:12
2	"Nee Bugga"	S. P. Balasubrahmanyam, P. Susheela	4:32
3	"Ramanna Ramudoi"	S. P. Balasubrahmanyam, P. Susheela	5:27
4	"Paadyami Naati Raathri"	P. Susheela	3:52
5	"Thotaa Kooraa"	S. P. Balasubrahmanyam, P. Susheela	4:27

== Others ==
- VCDs and DVDs on – SHALIMAR Video Company, Hyderabad
