= Nayakulaku Saval =

1984 Telugu film by K. S. R. Das

- Directed by: K. S. R. Das
- Screenplay by: K. S. R. Das
- Story by: M. D. Sundar
- Produced by: P. Padmanabham
- Starring: Krishna Ghattamaneni; Jaya Prada; Sumalatha; Allu Ramalingaiah
- Cinematography: Kabir Lal
- Edited by: Kotagiri Venkateswara Rao
- Music by: Satyam
- Production company: Makkal Tilagam Movies
- Release date: 6 June 1984
- Country: India
- Language: Telugu

Nayakulaku Saval (transl. The challenge for leaders) is a 1984 Indian Telugu action drama film produced by P. Padmanabham, directed by K. S. R. Das starring Krishna Ghattamaneni, Jaya Prada and Sumalatha in the lead roles. The film has musical score by Satyam.

== Cast ==
- Krishna Ghattamaneni as Bharath
- Jaya Prada as Chaithanya
- Sumalatha as Lalitha
- Allu Ramalingaiah as M.L.A. Lingam
- Nagabhushanam as Murikipudi Bangaraiah
- Prabhakar Reddy as Jailor Srinivasa Rao
- Giribabu as Nagaraju
- Kaikala Satyanarayana as Tiger Bhujangam
- Annapurna as Dr. Aparna
- Hema Sundar as Vikas Rao
- Jyothi Lakshmi
- Jayamalini as Ms. Malini
- Anuradha
- Raavi Kondala Rao as Chintapandu Sivaramaiah
- P.L. Narayana as Chief Minister
- Radha Kumari as Chaithanya's mother
- Pushpa Kumari as Pankajam
- Raghavaiah as Govardhana Rao
