= Guru Sishyulu =

Guru Sishyulu may refer to:

- Guru–shishya tradition, a teacher–student education system in ancient India
- Guru Sishyulu (1981 film), an Indian Telugu film
- Guru Sishyulu (1990 film), an Indian Telugu film

== See also ==
- Guru Sishyan (disambiguation)
- Guru Shishyaru (disambiguation)
