= Muddayi =

1987 Telugu action film by K. S. R. Das

- Directed by: K. S. R. Das
- Written by: K. S. R. Das; Paruchuri Brothers
- Produced by: Vadde Balaji Rao
- Starring: Krishna Ghattamaneni; Vijayashanti; Radha; Sarath Babu; Tiger Prabhakar; Sharada
- Cinematography: Pushpala Gopi Krishna
- Edited by: P. Venkateswara Rao
- Music by: Chakravarthy
- Production company: Sri Balaji Art Movies
- Release date: 3 July 1987
- Country: India
- Language: Telugu

Muddayi (transl. Accused) is a 1987 Indian Telugu-language action film directed by K. S. R. Das who also wrote the screenplay. Chakravarthy scored and composed the film's soundtrack. Produced by Vadde Balaji Rao under Sri Balaji Art movies, Muddayi was released on 3 July 1987 to generally positive reviews. The film featured an ensemble cast of Krishna Ghattamaneni, Vijayashanti, Radha, Sharada, Sarath Babu and Tiger Prabhakar in the lead roles. The film was edited by P. Venkateswara Rao while Pushpala Gopi handled the cinematography. The movie is a remake of 1982 Kannada film Jimmy Gallu which was also later remade by the director in Hindi in 1988 as Mulzim.

== Cast ==
- Krishna as Nagendra
- Vijayashanti as Malathi
- Radha as Rekha
- Sharada as Vijaya Chamundeswari
- Sarath Babu as Aruna Kumar
- Tiger Prabhakar as Ranjit Kumar
- Giribabu as Jaganmohan Rao
- Mucherla Aruna as Kamala
- Mada as Collector's assistant
- Mikkilineni as Collector
- Velu as Vadivelu
- Chitti Babu as Thadivelu

== Soundtrack ==
Soundtrack composed by K. Chakravarthy was released through Saptaswar music label. Lyrics were written by Veturi, Sirivennela Seetharama Sastry, Jaladi and Vennelakanti.

Tracklist
No.	Title	Lyrics	Singer(s)	Length
1.	"Mundu Nuvvu"	Sirivennela Seetharama Sastry	Raj Seetharam, P. Susheela	3:52
2.	"Cheeraala Chilakaa"	Veturi	Raj Seetharam, P. Susheela	4:09
3.	"Jaajipoola Panditlo"	Vennelakanti	Raj Seetharam, P. Susheela	3:46
4.	"Allaaru Muddugaa"	Jaladi	Raj Seetharam, P. Susheela	3:52
5.	"Pettu Pettu Laggamettu"	Veturi	Raj Seetharam, P. Susheela	3:59
6.	"Devaalayaanne Vidanaade"	Veturi	K. J. Yesudas, P. Susheela	4:05
Total length:				23:43
