= Kartavya (1985 film) =

Karthavya
- Directed by: K. S. R. Das
- Written by: Chi. Udaya Shankar
- Screenplay by: K. S. R. Das
- Story by: K. S. R. Das
- Produced by: Padmanabham
- Starring: Vishnuvardhan; Pavithra; Sudarshan; Lokanath
- Cinematography: Kabir Lal
- Edited by: P. Venkateshwara Rao
- Music by: Satyam
- Production company: Makkal Thilagam Pictures
- Distributed by: Makkal Thilagam Pictures
- Release date: 14 November 1984
- Running time: 129 min
- Country: India
- Language: Kannada

Karthavya is a 1985 Indian Kannada film, directed by K. S. R. Das and produced by Padmanabham. The film stars Vishnuvardhan, Pavithra, Sudarshan and Lokanath. The film has music by Satyam and was cinematographed by Kabir Lal in his independent debut.

== Cast ==
- Vishnuvardhan
- Pavithra
- Sudarshan
- Lokanath
- Vishwanath
- Suryakumar
- Srikanth
- Subramanya
- Pattabhi
- Vijaykumar
- Rajakumar
- G. N. Swamy
- B. Jayashree
- Devishree
- Jayamalini
- Jayasheela
- Shailashree in Guest Appearance
