= Unpaarvaiyil =

- Release poster
- Directed by: Kabir Lal
- Produced by: Ajay Kumar Singh; Rekha Singh
- Starring: Parvati Nair; Esha Chawla; Ganesh Venkatraman; Kamal Kamaraju
- Cinematography: Shahid Lal
- Edited by: Sathish Suriya
- Music by: Amar Mohile
- Production company: Lovely World Entertainment
- Distributed by: Sun NXT
- Release date: 19 December 2025
- Country: India
- Languages: Tamil; Telugu

Unpaarvaiyil (transl. In your gaze) is a 2025 Indian Tamil-language psychological thriller film directed by Kabir Lal starring Parvati Nair, Ganesh Venkatraman, and Master Mahendran. The film was simultaneously shot in Telugu as Divya Drushti (transl. Divine vision) with Sunil, Esha Chawla, and Kamal Kamaraju. It is a remake of the Spanish film Julia's Eyes. The film was released on 19 December 2025 on Sun NXT after a four-year delay.

== Plot ==
Bhavya's twin sister Divya is murdered. The former sets out to identify the killer, but becomes blind in the process. Bhavya is stressed after knowing the death of Divya and tells her husband Ganesh that Divya was waiting for surgery for her eye disease so this suicide cannot happen but ganesh suspect this all bhavyas tension exaggerating character . Bhavya identifies her blindness disease also getting uncovered with each stressful emotional condition and goes to a doctor who tells need eye rest and surgery to eyes . Bhavya comes to know of a stranger visited Divya frequently and starts in search of the stranger, each person who knows the stranger gets killed and the CCTV disc gets stolen as she visits the CCTV room and finally Ganesh also gets killed as found hanging one day. Later Bhavya gets hospitalised when she drives and gets blind . In the hospital one male stranger takes care of her and helps her. Bhavya gets invited to his home and Bhavya discovers the killer in him as he confess that he killed her for his love rejection and now tries to kill Bhavya who is blinded but manages to knock him down and call the police , as police comes the stranger cuts his throat and kills himself. Later Bhavya seen at hospital recover her eye health after the doctor opens the eye bandage. The eye donor was her husband Ganesh. Bhavya weeps at Ganesh body in mortuary telling she didn recognize his love for her when he was alive.

== Cast ==
| Cast (Tamil) | Cast (Telugu) | Role |
|---|---|---|
| Parvati Nair | Esha Chawla | Bhavya and Divya |
| Ganesh Venkatraman | Kamal Kamaraju | Krish |
| Master Mahendran | Sunil | Ajay |
| Nizhalgal Ravi | | |
| Tulasi | | |
| Pondy Ravi | | |
| Ajay Kumar Singh | | |
| Jaikar Naag | | |
| Venkatesh | | Eye doctor (uncredited) |

== Production ==
Kabir Lal who shot for the Bengali and unreleased Marathi remakes of Julia's Eyes titled Adrushya and Antardrishti, respectively, returned to helm the Tamil and Telugu remakes. The Tamil version initially starred Gayathrie Shankar and the Telugu version was initially titled as Agochara. The film was shot in early 2021 in Dehradun with Parvati Nair in Tamil and Esha Chawla in Telugu, both of them playing a visually impaired woman. Nair sustained many injuries including during the shooting of the climax when her head, arms, and legs were bleeding while splitting a table in half. Chawla sustained an injury during a chase sequence and ran into barbed wire while blindfolded. Ganesh Venkatraman and Kamal Kamaraju played the lead female character's husband, who is a psychologist, in Tamil and Telugu, respectively.

== Release and reception ==
Since the production team was based out of Mumbai and did not have distribution rights in Southern India, the makers opted for a direct-to-streaming release via Sun NXT. A critic from The Times of India rated the film two out of five stars and wrote, "With a textbook formula, Un Paarvayil has the right recipe for a psycho thriller – a scary bungalow, a loving but mysterious husband, and a psycho killer. But that's about it".
