= Guru Sishyan =

Guru Sishyan (transl. Teacher, Student) may refer to:

- Guru–shishya tradition, education system in ancient India
- Guru Sishyan (1988 film), a 1988 Indian Tamil-language film by S. P. Muthuraman
- Guru Sishyan (2010 film), a 2010 Indian Tamil-language film

== See also ==
- Guru Sishyulu (disambiguation)
- Guru Shishyaru (disambiguation)
