= Annadammula Savaal =

- Theatrical poster
- Directed by: K. S. R. Das
- Based on: Sahodarara Savaal (Kannada)(1977)
- Starring: Krishna; Rajinikanth; Jayachitra; Chandrakala
- Cinematography: S. S. Lal
- Edited by: P. Venkateswara Rao
- Music by: Satyam
- Production company: Sri Saradhi Studios
- Release date: 3 March 1978
- Running time: 152 minutes
- Country: India
- Language: Telugu

Annadammula Savaal (transl. Brothers' challenge) is a 1978 Indian Telugu-language drama film directed by K. S. R. Das. The film starring Krishna, Rajinikanth, Jayachitra and Chandrakala. Anjali Devi, Chalam, Jayamalini and Allu Ramalingaiah in the supporting cast. It is a remake of the 1977 Kannada film Sahodarara Savaal.

== Plot ==
It is a story which deals with a clash between two brothers, played by Krishna and Rajinikanth, and how they unite in the end.

== Cast ==
- Krishna
- Rajinikanth
- Anjali Devi
- Jayachitra
- Chandrakala
- Jayamalini
- Chalam
- Allu Ramalingaiah
- Thyagaraju as Ganganna
- Mikkilineni
- Tiger Prabhakar as Bhayankar
- Halam

== Soundtrack ==
Soundtrack was composed by Satyam. He reused the tune of "Ninagaagiye" from the original as "Naa Kosame".

No.	Title	Singer(s)	Length
1.	"Nee Roopame"	S. P. Balasubrahmanyam	4:29
2.	"Naa Kosame"	S. P. Balasubrahmanyam	3:20
3.	"Guvva Godekke"	S. P. Balasubrahmanyam, P. Susheela	3:33
4.	"Oh Pilla"	S. P. Balasubrahmanyam, S. Janaki	3:25
5.	"Nerpamantava"	S. P. Balasubrahmanyam, P. Susheela, M. Ramesh	3:57
Total length:			18:44
