= Inspector Rudra =

1990 Telugu action film by K. S. R. Das

- Directed by: K. S. R. Das
- Written by: K. S. R. Das
- Produced by: K. S. R. Das
- Starring: Krishna Ghattamaneni; Yamuna; Kaikala Satyanarayana; Gummadi
- Cinematography: V. Laxman
- Edited by: D. Venkataratnam
- Music by: Gangai Amaran
- Production company: K. S. R. Das Productions
- Release date: 12 January 1990
- Country: India
- Language: Telugu

Inspector Rudra is a 1990 Indian Telugu-language action film written, directed and produced by K. S. R. Das for K. S. R. Das Productions. The film features Krishna Ghattamaneni, Yamuna, Gummadi, Kaikala Satyanarayana and Kota Srinivasa Rao. The film has musical score by Gangai Amaran. The film was a remake of Das's own Kannada film Rudra.

The film was released on 12 January 1990 as the first film release for actor Krishna but failed to do well at the box office.

== Cast ==
- Krishna Ghattamaneni
- Yamuna
- Satyanarayana Kaikala as Dushasana Rao
- Gummadi
- Ranganath
- Kota Srinivasa Rao
- Charuhasan
- Hari Prasad
- Prasad Babu
- Jeeva
- Ravi Kondala Rao
- Bhimeswara Rao
- Telephone Satyanarayana
- Gundu Rajkumar
- Madan Mohan
- Lakshmipathi
- Anandaraj
- Annapurna
- Rajyalakshmi
- Baby Raasi
- P. R. Varalakshmi
- Radha Kumari
- Athili Lakshmi
- Hema

== Songs ==
Gangai Amaran scored and composed the film's soundtrack album. Veturi Sundararama Murthy penned the lyrics.

1. "Chelli Nuvve Maa Inti" -
2. "Chikchaang Chinnavaada" -
3. "Kavvinche Kartheekam" -
4. "Naa Age" -
5. "Naatu Kotti Vachaka" -
6. "Thega Preminchaku" -
