= Roshagadu =

- Theatrical release poster
- Directed by: K. S. R. Das
- Written by: Paruchuri Brothers
- Starring: Chiranjeevi; Madhavi; Kannada Prabhakar; Silk Smitha
- Music by: Satyam
- Release date: 29 July 1983
- Country: India
- Language: Telugu

Roshagadu is a 1983 Telugu film directed by K. S. R. Das. The film stars Chiranjeevi and Madhavi.

== Plot ==
Chiranjeevi played a dual role - Sikindar and Srikanth. Sikindar is a big and rowdy criminal who used to steal diamonds, cash and property from smugglers and dump them in a secret place (Durga temple). One day the smugglers attack Sikindar. In the ensuing chase Sikindar meets with an accident, after he gave a diary to a seemingly simple beggar. The diary recorded the details of Sikindar's hoard.

Srikanth has a sister and sister-in-law, Madhavi. He loves his sister and his mother, and on his death bed gives instructions to raise his sister. Madhavi's father does not agree to give his daughter to Srikanth for marriage, since he is very poor. After the death of Sikindar, Srikanth comes to town and is caught by the smugglers since they suspect that he is actually Sikindar. They torture him along with Silk Smitha who is an undercover police officer attempting to dislodge the smugglers. Because of this, Silk Smitha believed that Srikanth is not Sikindar and both escape. Kannada Prabhakar is a major villain and catches him with his sister. Later they kill Srikanth's sister and Srikanth escapes and prepares to get revenge on all smugglers including Prabhakar.

== Soundtrack ==
The soundtrack was composed by Sathyam. All lyrics were written by Rajasri.

Track list
No.	Title	Singer(s)	Length
1.	"Atchatla Mutchatla"	S. P. Balasubrahmanyam, P. Susheela	4:15
2.	"Chinnadani Konachoopu"	S. Janaki	4:53
3.	"Nenate Choodu Nene"	S. P. Balasubrahmanyam	4:38
4.	"Yavvanam Neeku Swagatham"	S. P. Balasubrahmanyam, S. Janaki	4:35
Total length:			18:21

== Reception ==
The film was remade in Hindi as Dav Pech with Jeetendra.
