= Guru Shishyaru =

Guru Shishyaru may refer to:

- Guru–shishya tradition, a teacher–student education system in ancient India
- Guru Shishyaru (1981 film), an Indian Kannada-language comedy film
- Guru Shishyaru (2022 film), an Indian Kannada-language sports drama film

== See also ==
- Guru Sishyulu (disambiguation)
- Guru Sishyan (disambiguation)
