= Mudi Sooda Mannan =

- Title card
- Directed by: R. Vittal
- Written by: Thooyavan
- Produced by: R. Vittal
- Starring: Jaishankar; Sridevi
- Cinematography: N. Balakrishnan
- Edited by: N. Dhamodharan; T. K. Rajan
- Music by: Satyam
- Production company: RV Films
- Release date: 15 September 1978
- Running time: 137 minutes
- Country: India
- Language: Tamil

Mudi Sooda Mannan (transl. Uncrowned monarch) is a 1978 Indian Tamil-language film produced and directed by R. Vittal, and written by Thooyavan. The film stars Jaishankar and Sridevi, with Y. Vijaya, Deepa, Sarath Babu, M. N. Nambiar, R. S. Manohar and S. A. Ashokan in supporting roles. It was released on 15 September 1978.

== Cast ==
- Jaishankar as Vikraman
- Sridevi as Roopa
- Y. Vijaya as Nandini
- Deepa as Pratima
- Sarath Babu as Bhairavan
- M. N. Nambiar as Rajaguru
- R. S. Manohar
- S. A. Ashokan

== Soundtrack ==
The music was composed by Satyam, and lyrics were written by Vaali.

Track listing
No.	Title	Singer(s)	Length
1.	"Thodangum Thodarum Pudhu Uravu"	S. P. Balasubrahmanyam, P. Susheela	4:29
2.	"Kadhal Bhodai Kannil Eray"	S. P. Balasubrahmanyam, S. Janaki	4:17
3.	"Naan Sonnal Podhum"	S. P. Balasubrahmanyam, P. Susheela
4.	"Mudi Sooda Mannan"	P. Susheela

== Reception ==
P. S. M. of Kalki criticised the film for lack of originality, and felt Manohar and Ashokan were wasted. Despite this, the film was a major success.
