= Annapurna (actress) =

Indian actress

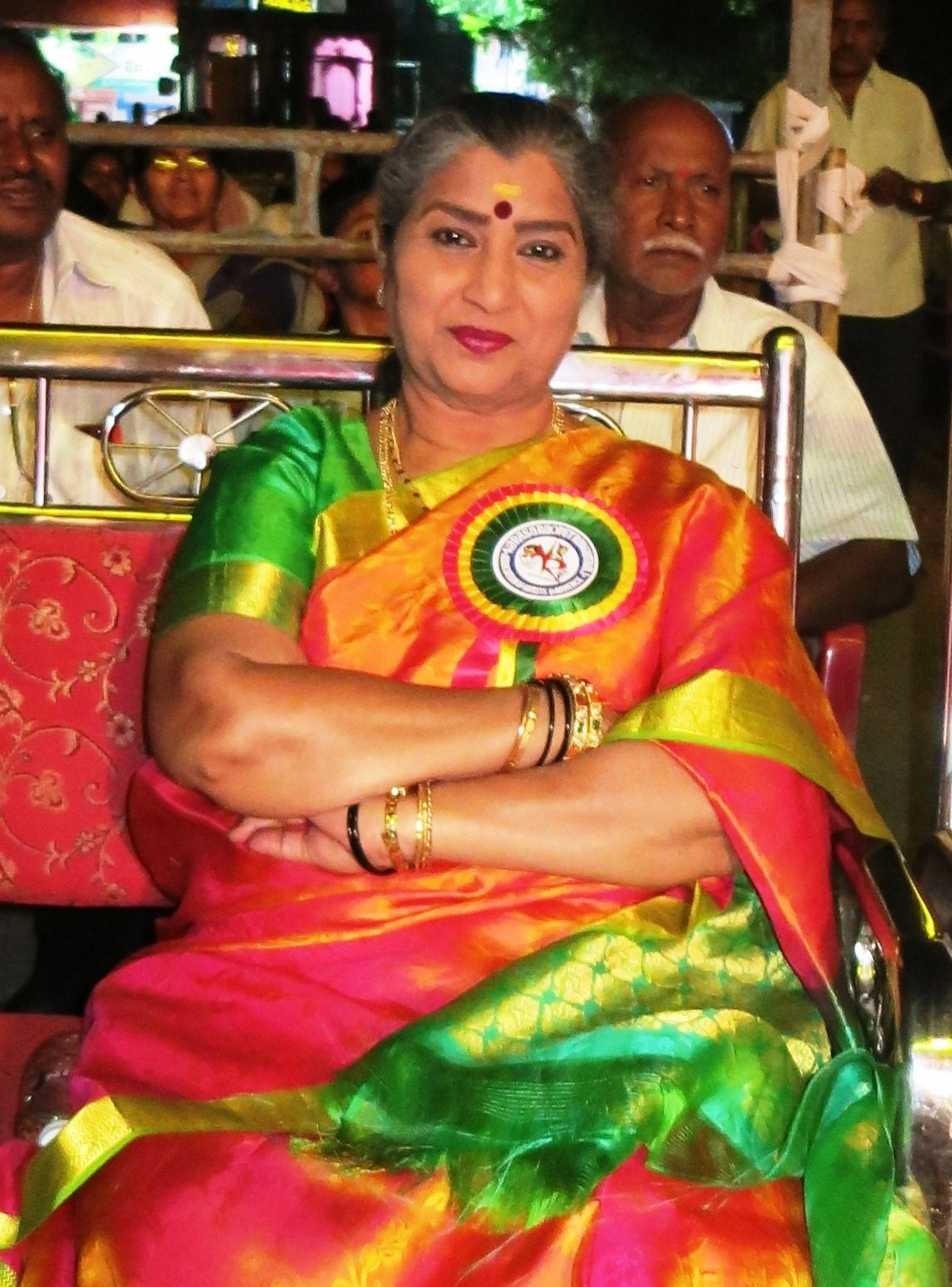
- Annapurna in 2019
- Born: Umamaheswari; 23 August 1954 (age 72); Vijayawada, Andhra State
- Other names: Annapurnamma, Uma
- Occupation: Actress
- Years active: 1970s–present

Annapurna (born Umamaheswari; 23 August 1954), also credited as Annapurnamma, is an Indian actress who appears primarily in Telugu films. She is known for her portrayal as mother, mother-in-law, grand mother, aunt, etc. She started her film career as an actor alongside Mohan Babu (debut film) in the blockbuster Telugu film Swargam Narakam directed by Dasari Narayana Rao in 1975. She appeared in over 900 films and won three Nandi Awards.

== Early life ==
Annapurna was born as Umamaheswari on 23 August 1954 in Vijayawada, Andhra Pradesh to Prasad Rao and Sitaravamma. Though she was initially credited as Uma, lyricist C. Narayana Reddy changed it when she did Dasari Narayana Rao-directed Swargam Narakam.

== Career ==
Annapurna has started her film career in 1975. She is well remembered for her character roles in Samsaram Oka Chadarangam, Muthyamantha Muddu, Swargam Narakam, Assembly Rowdy and acted in almost all of the 1980s movies with Chiranjeevi as lead hero namely Donga, Chattamtho Poratam, Sangharshana, Rakshasudu, Trinetrudu, Marana Mrudangam, Khaidi No 786, and Jwala.

She has also acted in Tamil film such as Nadodi Pattukkaran, and Varavu Nalla Uravu etc. With the absence from the screen for few years, she started her second innings in 2007 with the Telugu films Evadithe Nakenti and Godava as mother and grand mother respectively.

Annapurna who played the role of lead actress in Swargam Narakam alongside Mohan Babu, also played the role of mother to Mohan Babu in Assembly Rowdy (1991). She went on to appear in over 700 to 800 films.

== Personal life ==
Annapurna had a daughter, Keerthi, who died by suicide in June 2018.

== Filmography ==
List of films appeared:

=== Telugu ===
- Swargam Narakam (1975)
- Secretary (1976)
- Tiger (1979)
- Subhodhayam (1980)
- Superman (1980)
- Bebbuli (1980) as Parvathi
- Mondi Ghatam (1982)
- Bangaru Kanuka (1982)
- Manishiko Charithra (1982)
- Manchu Pallaki (1982)
- Intlo Ramayya Veedhilo Krishnayya (1982)
- Anuraga Devatha (1982)
- Mundadugu (1983)
- Kalyana Veena (1983)
- Chanda Sasanudu (1983)
- Pelli Choopulu (1983)
- Aalaya Sikharam (1983)
- Maga Maharaju (1983)
- Sivudu Sivudu Sivudu (1983)
- Sangarshana (1983)
- Lanke Bindelu (1983) as Mahalakshmi
- Manishiko Charithra (1983)
- Illalu Priyuralu (1984)
- Daku (1984)
- Bava Maradallu (1984)
- Dongalu Baboi Dongalu (1984)
- Bangaru Kapuram (1984) as Annapurna
- Goonda (1984) as Sarada
- Naagu (1984)
- Devanthakudu (1984)
- Inti Guttu (1984)
- Mukkopi (1984)
- Ee Charitra Inkennallu (1984) as Shantha
- Rustum (1984)
- Dandayatra (1984)
- Hero (1984)
- Nayakulaku Saval (1984) as Dr. Aparna
- Bobbili Brahmanna (1984) as Susheela
- Jackie (1985)
- Maha Manishi (1985)
- Mugguru Mitrulu (1985)
- Pelli Meeku Akshintalu Naaku (1985)
- Edadugula Bandham (1985)
- Devalayam (1985)
- Nerasthudu (1985) as Parvathy
- Palnati Simham (1985) as Durgamba
- Chattamtho Poratam (1985) as Parvathy
- Puli (1985) as Savitri
- Agni Parvatam (1985)
- Illale Devata (1985)
- Kotha Pelli Koothuru (1985)
- Chiranjeevi (1985)
- Jwala (1985)
- Bharyabhartala Bandham (1985)
- Shrimati Garu (1985)
- Raktha Sindhuram (1985)
- Oka Radha Iddaru Krishnulu (1986)
- Dora Bidda (1986)
- Rakshasudu (1986)
- Manavudu Danavudu (1986)
- Jayam Manade (1986) as Rajeshwari
- Aadi Dampathulu (1986)
- Pavithra (1986)
- Karpoora Deepam (1986)
- Vikram (1986)
- Pasuputhadu (1986)
- Naa Pilupe Prabhanjanam (1986)
- Punyasthree (1986)
- Sakkanodu (1986)
- Papikondalu (1986)
- Anasuyamma Gari Alludu (1986)
- Prathibhavanthudu (1986) as Shantha
- Kirathakudu (1986)
- Aranyakanda (1986)
- Prema Gharshana (1986)
- Chanakya Shapadham (1986) as Janaki, Chanakya's mother
- Samsaram Oka Chadarangam (1987)
- Inti Donga (1987)
- Daada (1987)
- Donga Kapuram (1987)
- Bhargava Ramudu (1987)
- Makutamleni Maharaju (1987)
- Ajeyudu (1987)
- Ida Prapancham (1987)
- Bhale Mogudu (1987)
- Jebu Donga (1987)
- Donga Garu Swagatham (1987) as Annapurna
- Ramudu Bheemudu (1988)
- Yamudiki Mogudu (1988)
- Mugguru Kodukulu (1988)
- Pelli Chesi Choodu (1988)
- Donga Pelli (1988)
- Station Master (1988)
- Dorakani Donga (1988) as Annapurna
- Ontari Poratam (1989)
- Swara Kalpana (1989)
- Attaku Yamudu Ammayiki Mogudu (1989)
- State Rowdy (1989)
- Ajatha Satruvu (1989)
- Black Tiger (1989)
- Manchivaru Maavaru (1989)
- Bandhuvulostunnaru Jagratha (1989)
- Aakhari Kshanam (1989)
- Parthudu (1989)
- Vintha Kodallu (1989)
- Yamapasam (1989)
- Bhagavan (1989)
- Mamathala Kovela (1989)
- Dorikithe Dongalu (1989)
- Muthyamantha Muddu (1989)
- Sahasa Putrudu (1990)
- Adadhi (1990)
- Intinta Deepavali (1990)
- Padmavathi Kalyanam (1990)
- Nagastram (1990)
- Inspector Rudra (1990)
- Raja Vikramarka (1990)
- Irugillu Porugillu (1990)
- Neti Charitra (1990)
- Appula Appa Rao (1991)
- People's Encounter (1991)
- Stuartpuram Police Station (1991)
- Assembly Rowdy (1991)
- Rowdy Gaari Pellam (1991)
- Pandirimancham (1991)
- Srivari Chindulu (1991)
- Bhargav (1991)
- Ramudu Kadhu Rakshasudu (1991)
- Aditya 369 (1991)
- Viyyala Vari Vindhu (1991)
- Kadapa Reddemma(1991)
- Pachchani Samsaram (1992)
- Hello Darling (1992)
- Rowdy Inspector (1992)
- Allari Mogudu (1992)
- President Gari Pellam (1992)
- Pranadaata (1992)
- Chirunavvula Varamistava (1993)
- Mechanic Alludu (1993)
- Kannayya Kittayya (1993)
- Chittemma Mogudu (1993)
- Tholi Muddu (1993)
- Sabash Ramu (1993)
- Gaayam (1993)
- Naga Jyothi (1993)
- Major Chandrakanth (1993)
- Bangaru Bullodu (1993)
- Govinda Govinda (1994)
- Shubha Lagnam (1994)
- Gharana Alludu (1994) as Poorna
- Hello Brother (1994)
- Punya Bhoomi Naa Desam (1994)
- Donga Rascal (1994)
- Brahmachari Mogudu (1994)
- Muddula Priyudu (1994)
- O Thandri O Koduku (1994)
- Chilakapachcha Kapuram (1995)
- Ketu Duplicatu (1995)
- Neti Savithri (1996)
- Topi Raja Sweety Roja (1996)
- Kuturu (1996)
- Akkum Bakkum (1996)
- Hello Guru (1996)
- Vamsanikokkadu (1996)
- Maa Inti Aadapaduchu (1996)
- Puttinti Gowravam (1996)
- Pavithra Bandham (1996)
- Sindhooram (1997)
- Pelli Chesukundam (1997)
- Hello, I Love You (1997)
- Kaliyugamlo Gandargolam (1997)
- Ugadi (1997)
- Muddula Mogudu (1997)
- Peddannayya (1997)
- Devudu (1997)
- Bavagaru Bagunnara (1998)
- Pandaga (1998)
- Aahaa..! (1998)
- Yuvaratna Rana (1998)
- Subhalekhalu (1998)
- Love Story 1999 (1998)
- Suryudu (1998)
- Pavitra Prema (1998)
- Prema Katha (1999)
- Sulthan (1999)
- Raja (1999)
- Anaganaga Oka Ammai (1999)
- Manasunna Maaraju (2000)
- Kodanda Ramudu(2000)
- Nuvve Kavali (2000)
- Kalisundam Raa (2000)
- Sri Srimati Satyabhama (2000)
- Kouravudu (2000)
- Tiladaanam (2000)
- Murari (2001)
- Ammo Bomma (2001)
- Pandanti Samsaram (2001)
- Dadagiri (2001)
- Darling Darling (2001) as Rajyalakshmi
- Seema Simham (2002)
- Premaku Swagatam (2002)
- Kalusukovalani (2002)
- Tappu Chesi Pappu Koodu (2002)
- Appudappudu (2003)
- Aa Naluguru (2004)
- Kanchanamala Cable TV (2005)
- Evadaithe Nakenti (2007)
- Godava (2007)
- Arundhati (2009)
- Pistha (2009)
- Manasara (2010)
- Panchakshari (2010)
- Krishnam Vande Jagadgurum (2012)
- Gundello Godari (2013 )
- Doosukeltha (2013)
- Band Balu (2013)
- Emo Gurram Egaravachu (2014)
- Avatharam (2014)
- Oka Laila Kosam (2014)
- Drushyam (2014)
- Krishna Gaadi Veera Prema Gaadha (2016)
- Eluka Majaka (2016)
- Sarrainodu (2016)
- A Aa (2016)
- Ekkadiki Pothavu Chinnavada (2016)
- Babu Baga Busy (2017)
- Goutham Nanda (2017)
- Rarandoi Veduka Chudham (2017)
- Raju Gari Gadhi 2 (2017)
- Raja The Great (2017)
- Malli Raava (2017)
- Touch Chesi Chudu (2018)
- Nela Ticket (2018)
- Saakshyam (2018)
- Happy Wedding (2018)
- Srinivasa Kalyanam (2018)
- Geetha Govindam (2018)
- Paper Boy (2018)
- F2 - Fun and Frustration (2019)
- Where Is the Venkatalakshmi (2019)
- Maharshi (2019)
- Gaddalakonda Ganesh (2019)
- Tenali Ramakrishna BA. BL (2019)
- Entha Manchivaadavuraa (2020)
- Disco Raja (2020)
- Orey Bujjiga (2020)
- Amaram Akhilam Prema (2020)
- Annapurnamma Gari Manavadu (2020)
- Lalijo Lalijo (2021)
- Cycle (2021)
- Zombie Reddy (2021)
- Thank You Brother (2021)
- Konda Polam (2021)
- Drushyam 2 (2021)
- F3 (2022)
- Gangster Gangaraju (2022)
- Pellikuturu Party (2022)
- Sita Ramam (2022)
- Pratibimbalu (2022)
- Malli Modalaindi (2022)
- Veera Simha Reddy (2023)
- O Saathiya (2023)
- Malli Pelli (2023)
- Custody (2023)
- Extra Ordinary Man (2023)
- Maruthi Nagar Subramanyam (2024)
- 100 Crores (2024)
- Mr. Bachchan (2024)
- KA (2024)
- Pelli Kani Prasad (2025)
- Oka Brundavanam (2025)
- Oh Bhama Ayyo Rama (2025)
- Telusu Kada (2025)
- Sampradayini Suppini Suddapoosani (2026)
- Hey Balwanth (2026)
- Raakaasa (2026)

=== Tamil ===
- Vaathiyaar Veettu Pillai (1989)
- Varavu Nalla Uravu (1990)
- Nadodi Pattukkaran (1992)
- Hero (1994)
- Meendum Savithri (1996)
- Jolly (1998)
- Thaayin Manikodi (1998)
- Hey Ram (2000)
- Aanai (2005)
- Custody (2023)

=== Kannada ===
- Rowdy & MLA (1991)
- Shanti Kranti (1991)
- Edurmaneli Ganda Pakkadmaneli Hendthi (1992)
- Gadibidi Ganda (1993)

=== Hindi ===
- Hum Hain Khalnayak (1996)
- Hey Ram (2000)

=== Malayalam ===
- Kottayam (2020)

== Awards ==
Nandi Awards

- Best Supporting Actress – Manishiko Charitra (1982)
- Special Jury Award – Dabbu Bhale Jabbu (1992)
- Best Character Actress – Maa Inti Aadapaduchu (1996)
