= Insaf Ki Pukar =

1987 film by T. Rama Rao

- Flyer
- Directed by: T. Rama Rao
- Screenplay by: M. D. Sundar
- Story by: M. D. Sundar
- Produced by: Raj Bhaktiani; Ramesh Gwalani
- Starring: Dharmendra; Jeetendra; Anita Raj; Bhanupriya
- Cinematography: V. Durga Prasad
- Edited by: T. V. Balasubramanyam; J. Krishna Swamy
- Music by: Laxmikant–Pyarelal
- Production company: Shivkala Movies
- Release date: 25 December 1987
- Running time: 146 minutes
- Country: India
- Language: Hindi

Insaf Ki Pukar (transl. The Call of Justice) is a 1987 Indian Hindi-language action film, produced by Raj Bhaktiani and Ramesh Gwalani under the Shivkala Movies banner and directed by T. Rama Rao. It stars Dharmendra, Jeetendra, Anita Raj and Bhanupriya, with music composed by Laxmikant–Pyarelal. The film was remade in Tamil as Guru Sishyan (1988) and Telugu as Guru Sishyulu (1990).

== Plot ==
Soon-to-be released convicts Vijay and Ajay meet Manohar, who has been sentenced to death. He tells them that his sister was kidnapped by a taxi driver, then raped and murdered by Dinesh Lal, younger brother of a plutocrat Dhani Lal. The Lals, Dhani Lal's partner Sohan Lal and corrupt Inspector Imaandar framed Manohar for the taxi driver's murder. Vijay and Ajay decide to clear Manohar's name, and stall his execution by fracturing his leg. After release, they gain control over Imaandar, by which Vijay infiltrates the Lals' services as a bodyguard for Dinesh Lal. Besides, Ajay traps Rani daughter of Dhani Lal. In tandem, Vijay loves Sheela, daughter of Imaandar. Soon enough, they realise that Manohar's parents are held captive by Dhani Lal since Jagannath, father of Manohar, is aware of a hidden treasure. After rescuing them, Ajay recognises them as his parents from whom he was separated in childhood. Vijay recognises Jagannath as the murderer of his parents. Jagannath reveals the truth: the actual culprit is Sohan Lal who murdered Vijay's parents wearing a mask of Jagannath. Eventually, Vijay and Ajay thwart their enemies, safeguard the treasure, and free Manohar.

== Cast ==
- Dharmendra as Vijay
- Jeetendra as Ajay
- Anita Raj as Sheela
- Bhanupriya as Rani
- Prem Chopra as Dhanilal
- Anupam Kher as Sohanlal
- Shakti Kapoor as Dinesh
- Kader Khan as Inspector Imaandaar
- Aruna Irani as Meena Imaandaar
- Shreeram Lagoo as Inspector Jagannath
- Ashalata Wabgaonkar as Mrs. Jagannath
- Om Shivpuri as Police Commissioner Ranjeet
- Avinash Wadhavan as Manohar
- Tiku Talsania as Municipal Inspector Narayan Singh
- Mac Mohan as Solomon
- Satyen Kappu as Chacha

== Soundtrack ==
The music of the film was composed by Laxmikant–Pyarelal, and Anand Bakshi wrote the songs.

| Song | Singer |
|---|---|
| "Aa Aa Mere Diljaani" | Kavita Krishnamurthy, Kishore Kumar |
| "Pyar Ka Shola Bhadka" | Kavita Krishnamurthy, Kishore Kumar |
| "Achha Bura Jaane Khuda" | Kishore Kumar, Mohammed Aziz |
| "Tune Jaga Diya" | Mohammed Aziz, Anuradha Paudwal |
| "Toota Yeh Dil Ka Sheesha" | Anuradha Paudwal |
