= Thooral Ninnu Pochchu =

1982 film by K. Bhagyaraj

- Theatrical release poster
- Directed by: K. Bhagyaraj
- Written by: K. Bhagyaraj
- Produced by: Kovai C. M. Nanjappan
- Starring: K. Bhagyaraj; Sulakshana; M. N. Nambiar
- Cinematography: B. Kalaiselvam
- Edited by: V. Rajagopal
- Music by: Ilaiyaraaja
- Production company: Durga Bhagavathy Films
- Release date: 14 April 1982
- Country: India
- Language: Tamil

Thooral Ninnu Pochchu (transl. The drizzle has stopped) is a 1982 Indian Tamil-language romantic drama film written, directed by and starring K. Bhagyaraj. The film also stars Sulakshana and M. N. Nambiar. It was released on 14 April 1982. The film was remade in Telugu as Pelli Choopulu (1983), in Hindi as Mohabbat (1985), and in Kannada as Gowri Kalyana (1991).

== Plot ==
The only daughter of village elder Ponnambalam, Mangalam, prepares for her prospective groom's visit. The groom, Chella Durai, and his family visit Mangalam's house. Chella Durai falls for Mangalam, who is very naïve and shy. The next day he visits Mangalam at the riverside and she panics. Mangalam's uncle, martial arts trainer Nambiar, mistakes Chella Durai to be mishandling Mangalam. Mangalam runs and Nambiar sends his men to fight Chella Durai. Chella Durai defeats them and Nambiar learns he's Mangalam's groom. Ponnambalam's brother-in-law Ayyavu loves Mangalam and was not inform of the groom's visit. Chella Durai and his family visit the astrologer to fix a date for his reception, but there is no auspicious day that month. So the family plans to set the reception next month. Chella Durai visits Mangalam's house, where she is alone. She is shy of him and runs out of the house. Nambiar arrives and gives Chella Durai an idea to court Mangalam. Chella Durai kidnaps Mangalam and soon, she opens up to him.

On new moon day, Nambiar performs the rites for someone, whose identity is unclear, who died from suicide. In the meantime, Chella Durai hopes to explain sex to the innocent Mangalam, who is still shy. But she starts to love Chella Durai more. Chella Durai's stepmother demands more dowry than what Ponnambalam can give and refuses to compromise. Before Ponnambalam leaves for a panchayat, Chella Durai visits him and gives him money for the dowry so he can marry Mangalam. Ponnambalam is humiliated and refuses. The next day Mangalam advises Chella Durai to marry another girl due to the dowry problem. Chella Durai hits Mangalam for persuades her to elope the next morning. But Mangalam refuses to disobey her father or his dignity would be lost. Chella Durai's parents catch him stealing money from their house to elope, so they lock him in a room. Mangalam waits until sunrise and returns home when Chella Durai fails to turn up. At home, Ponnambalam attempts suicide but Nambiar saves him. Ponnambalam doubts his daughter's innocence and Mangalam, hearing this, burns her feet. Ponnambalam learns about this and forgives Mangalam. But he still detests Chella Durai.

Nambiar invites Chella Durai to stay in his house and promises to change Ponnambalam's mind. Nambiar visits Ponnambalam to persuade him. Mangalam admits she will only marry who her father decides. Nambiar challenges to Ponnambalam he will unite Mangalam and Chella Durai in 1 month or cut half his moustache. Nambiar then stirs up a panchayat and the villagers desert him, his assistant Karuppannai, and Chella Durai. There are only 15 days remaining in the challenge. Chella Durai takes a nuptial string to Mangalam and single-handedly fights Ayyavu and his men. In the last 10 days, Nambiar persuades men in buses to visit Mangalam and reject her on purpose. Ponnambalam hits his daughter and wife when 7 'grooms' reject her. Unable to witness Mangalam abused by Ponnambalam, Chella Durai decides to leave the village. But Nambiar refuses to let him leave due to the ego problems he will face when the challenge is over. So both of them have a fight to see who wins. Chella Durai wins Nambiar and is about to leave, but is guilty when he remembers the bond they shared.

Nambiar takes Chella Durai to the grave he performs rites at, explaining it is none other than his lover from 40 years ago. Nambiar was in a similar state as Chella Durai and so he abandoned his lover but she committed suicide. Fearing Mangalam may follow the same, Nambiar persuades Chella Durai to marry her at all costs. The next day, Ponnambalam decides to marry Mangalam with Ayyavu and distributes marriage invitations to the villagers. Mangalam's mother and grandmother advise her to elope with Chella Durai and explain Ponnambalam's ego to her. Ponnambalam overhears this and learns his mistake. He forgives Mangalam and rips the invitations. But when Ayyavu learns about this, he stabs Ponnambalam and Chella Durai suppresses him. Ponnambalam bleeds profusely and everyone hurries to help him. In his dying breaths, Ponnambalam indicates to Chella Durai his consent to Mangalam's marriage.

== Cast ==
- K. Bhagyaraj as Chella Durai
- Sulakshana as Mangalam
- M. N. Nambiar as Subbaiya Naidu
- Senthamarai as Ponnambalam
- Senthil as Karuppannai
- Suryakanth as Ayyavu
- 'Duck' Sivaraman as Moorthy
- K.G.Shanthi as Kannamma
- Meenakshi Amma as Maruthayi
- Arunthathi as Ponni
- Chelladurai as Thangam

== Production ==
Bhanupriya was originally chosen to be the lead actress after Bhagyaraj spotted her at a dance school, but after the photoshoot he felt she looked too young for this role and she was replaced by Sulakshana.

== Soundtrack ==
The soundtrack was composed by Ilaiyaraaja. The song "Bhoopalam Isaikkum" is set in Gourimanohari raga, "Yerikkarai Poongatre" is set in Sankarabharanam, and "Thanga Sangili" is set in Keeravani.

Track listing
No.	Title	Lyrics	Singer(s)	Length
1.	"Bhoopalam Isaikkum"	Muthulingam	K. J. Yesudas, Uma Ramanan	04:25
2.	"Thanga Sangili"	Vairamuthu	Malaysia Vasudevan, S. Janaki	04:00
3.	"Yerikkarai Poongaatre Nee Pora Vazhi"	Chidambaranathan	K. J. Yesudas	03:43
4.	"Yen Soga Kadhaiye (Pankajavalli)"	Gangai Amaran	Malaysia Vasudevan, Krishnamoorthi	05:24
5.	"Thaalatta Nan Poranthen"	Vaali	Malaysia Vasudevan	04:09
Total length:				21:41

== Release and reception ==
Thooral Ninnu Pochu was released on 14 April 1982. Playing on the film's title, Thiraignani of Kalki wrote, "Aluppu thattipochu" (boredom knocked). The film ran for over 300 days at Madurai Thangam, the then largest theatre in Asia. Chidambaranathan won the Tamil Nadu State Film Award for Best Lyricist.

== Bibliography ==
- Sundararaman (2007) [2005]. Raga Chintamani: A Guide to Carnatic Ragas Through Tamil Film Music (2nd ed.). Pichhamal Chintamani. OCLC 295034757.
