= Swapna (1981 film) =

1981 film by Dasari Narayana Rao

- Directed by: Dasari Narayana Rao
- Based on: Sangam (1964) by Raj Kapoor
- Produced by: Jagadish Prasad
- Starring: Swapna; Raja
- Cinematography: Mani K.S
- Music by: Satyam
- Release date: 30 June 1981
- Country: India
- Languages: Telugu; Kannada

Swapna is a 1981 Indian multilingual film directed by Dasari Narayana Rao and produced by Jagadish Prasad. A remake of the 1964 Hindi film Sangam, it was simultaneously shot in Telugu and Kannada. The film stars Raja, Swapna, and Ramji in lead roles and marked the acting debut of Swapna.

The music, composed by Satyam, was well received, with notable songs including "Ide Naa Modati Premalekha" in Telugu and its Kannada version "Idene Prathama Prema Geethe," as well as "Ankitam Neeke Ankitam" and its Kannada counterpart "Arpane Ninage Arpane."

== Plot ==
Shankar holds a great fondness for Swapna, who happens to be his childhood friend alongside Ramesh. Despite this, Swapna harbours romantic feelings towards Ramesh. Nevertheless, a sudden turn of events takes place, altering their lives in a significant way.

== Cast ==
- Raja
- Swapna
- Ramji
- Chatla Sriramulu
- Jayababu
- Reena
- Ragini

== Music ==
The music for the film was composed by Sathyam, while the lyrics were written by Rajasri and Dasari Narayana Rao.

Telugu Track list
No.	Title	Lyrics	Singer(s)	Length
1.	"Ankitham Neeke Ankitham"	Dasari Narayana Rao	S. P. Balasubrahmanyam	4:59
2.	"Mallemogga"	Dasari Narayana Rao	S. P. Balasubrahmanyam, S. Janaki	4:37
3.	"Sri Rasthu Ammayi Subhamasthu Abbayi"	Rajasri	P. B. Srinivas, P. Susheela	4:34
4.	"Idhe Naa Modhati Prema Lekha"	Rajasri	S. P. Balasubrahmanyam	5:01
5.	"Andhalu Rasiga Posi"	Rajasri	S. P. Balasubrahmanyam, S. Janaki	5:05
6.	"Mudda Mudda Mandaralu"	Dasari Narayana Rao	G. Anand, Madhavapeddi Ramesh, S. Janaki	5:02
Total length:				29:21

== Release ==
Due to a mistake in the film lab, the Tamil version was never released. The Telugu and Kannada versions, however, were great successes.
