= Hema Sundar =

Indian actor

- Occupation: Actor
- Years active: 1972-present
- Awards: Nandi Award; Nandi Award for Best Actor (1978)

Hema Sundar is an Indian actor known for his works in Telugu cinema. He starred in over 300 feature films. He made his debut with the 1972 film Vichithra Bandham.

== Awards ==
- Nandi Awards
- Nandi Award for Best Actor (1978) - Naalaga Endaro

== Filmography ==
Year	Film	Role
1972	Vichithra Bandham	
1977	Chilakamma Cheppindi	Kanakayya
1978	Naalaaga Endaro	
1979	Kukka Katuku Cheppu Debba	
1979	Kothala Raayudu	Retd. Judge Ranga Rao
1980	Sivamethina Satyam	Ramakrishna Prasad
1980	Gharana Donga	Papa Rao
1980	Love in Singapore	
1981	Chattaniki Kallu Levu	Jagannath
1981	Thyagayya	
1982	Subhalekha	
1982	Manishiko Charithra	
1982	Pralaya Rudrudu	Doctor
1983	Puli Debba	Hare Ram
1983	Iddaru Kiladilu	
1983	Pelli Choopulu	
1984	Rustum	
1984	Manishiko Charithra	
1984	Kondaveeti Nagulu	Rangayya
1984	Sardar	Dharmayya
1984	Daku	
1984	Nayakulaku Saval	Vikas Rao
1984	Dongalu Baboi Dongalu	
1985	Palnati Simham	Srinivasa Naidu
1985	Intiko Rudramma	Judge
1985	Aalaapana	
1985	Maa Inti Mahalakshmi	Ramadasu
1985	Chattamtho Poratam	Judge
1985	Garjana	Raghava Rao
1986	Sakkanodu	
1987	Chinnari Devatha	School master
1987	Swayamkrushi	
1987	Pagabattina Panchali	
1987	Veera Viharam	
1987	Gandhinagar Rendava Veedhi	
1987	Samsaram Oka Chadarangam	Jagannatham
1987	Rakshasa Samharam	
1987	Sahasa Samrat	Sarabhaiah
1988	Mr. Hero	
1988	August 15 Raatri	Victim's father
1988	Veguchukka Pagatichukka	
1989	Bala Gopaludu	
1989	Praja Theerpu	
1989	Ayyappa Swamy Mahatyam	
1989	Dorikithe Dongalu	
1989	Chennapatnam Chinnollu	Dokka Venkataiah
1990	Guru Sishyulu	Narayana Rao
1990	Raktha Jwala	
1994	Kourava Samrajyam	
2001	Inspector Vikram	
2004	Nenunnanu	
2004	That Is Pandu	
