= Sahodarara Savaal =

- CD cover
- Directed by: K. S. R. Das
- Screenplay by: M. D. Sundar
- Produced by: A. R. Raju
- Starring: Vishnuvardhan; Rajinikanth
- Cinematography: S. S. Lal
- Edited by: K. S. R. Das; Venkateshwara Rao
- Music by: Satyam
- Production company: Ajantha Combines
- Release date: 16 September 1977
- Running time: 158 minutes
- Country: India
- Language: Kannada

Sahodarara Savaal ( transl. Challenge of the brothers) is a 1977 Indian Kannada-language film directed by K. S. R. Das. It stars Vishnuvardhan and Rajinikanth. The film was remade in Telugu as Annadammula Savaal (1978). It was released on 16 September 1977.

== Cast ==
- Vishnuvardhan as Kiran
- Rajinikanth as Somashekhar
- Kavitha as Jyothi
- Bhavani as Lakshmi
- Leelavathi as Jyothi's mother
- M. Jayashree as Kiran and Shekhar's mother
- Balakrishna as Krishnappa
- Dwarakish as Raja
- Tiger Prabhakar as Kalappa
- Shakti Prasad as Ranga
- Pramila Joshai as Putti
- Jayamalini as Parvati
- Halam as dancer
- Chethan Ramarao
- Rathnakar as Tukaram Rao
- Master Guruprasad
- Master Ramesh

== Soundtrack ==
The music was composed by Satyam with lyrics for the soundtrack written by Chi. Udayashankar. The songs "Hey Nanagaagiye" and "O Nallane Savi Mathonda" became popular. It went on to be retained in the Telugu version as "Naakosame Neevunnadhi".

Track listing
No.	Title	Singer(s)	Length
1.	"O Nallane Savi Mathonda"	S. P. Balasubrahmanyam, P. Susheela	3:17
2.	"Yeke Noduve Haage"	S.P. Balasubrahmanyam, S. Janaki	3:26
3.	"Maathonda"	S. P. Balasubrahmanyam, S. Janaki	3:07
4.	"Hey Nanagaagiye"	S. P. Balasubrahmanyam	3:08
Total length:			12:58

== Bibliography ==
- Ramachandran, Naman (2014) [2012]. Rajinikanth: The Definitive Biography. New Delhi: Penguin Books. ISBN 978-0-14-342111-5.
