= I Love You (1979 film) =

- Poster
- Directed by: Vayu Nandana Rao
- Produced by: S. Kumara Swamy; S. Lakshmikanth
- Starring: Chiranjeevi
- Music by: Satyam
- Production company: Sri Gauri Combines
- Release date: 1 June 1979
- Country: India
- Language: Telugu

I Love You is a 1979 Indian Telugu-language film that was directed by Vayu Nandana Rao. This film starred Chiranjeevi, Suvarna, Prasad Babu, P. L. Narayana and others. It was simultaneously filmed in Kannada with the same title starring Shankar Nag with Suvarna reprising her role.

== Plot ==
Ramesh's (Chiranjeevi) daily routine involves driving along with his friends, seducing young women and ditching them. He targets Suvarna, a middle-class girl who has come from a village for her education. Suvarna is accompanied by her cousin Prasad Babu who wants to marry her and becomes jealous when he finds Suvarna in Ramesh's car. He warns her, but Suvarna gets attracted towards Ramesh and one day, Ramesh ditches her. Later, Suvarna finds out that Ramesh has met with an accident and is now unable to walk and is spending time in a wheelchair. She uses Ramesh's cousin and finds a place in his home and treats him as a nurse.

Meanwhile, Ramesh's mother and uncle plan to get him married to his uncle's daughter. Suvarna teases Ramesh in every possible manner making him realize his mistake and helplessness. Ramesh realizes his mistakes and decides to marry Suvarna and talks to her father. Against her father's will, Suvarna marries Ramesh but discovers that Ramesh is impotent. Following the advice of her doctor, she intentionally hurts Ramesh's ego and leaves his house. Hurt, Ramesh decides to prove himself by standing on his legs. He drives to her house and forces himself on her. In the end, Suvarna is happy that Ramesh got back his legs and a changed Ramesh lives happily with her.

== Cast ==
Cast (Telugu)	Cast (Kannada)	Role
Chiranjeevi	Shankar Nag	Ramesh
Suvarna		Geetha
Prasad Babu	Srinivasa Murthy	Sathyam
Pallavi		
Sathyakala		
Susheela Naidu		

Telugu version

- Sakshi Ranga Rao as Club Owner
- P. L. Narayana as Parandhamayya
- Kakarala as Geetha's father
- Satyendra Kumar as Doctor

Kannada version

- Upasane Seetharam
- Mamatha Shenoy
- M. S. Sathya
- M. S. Umesh as Subbu
- Uma Shivakumar
- Jayakumar
- Nataraj
- Ashwath Narayana
- Krishna Prasad
- Durgaprasad

== Soundtrack ==
The soundtrack was composed by Satyam. The song "Oka Matundi" / "Hithavagide" is based on "There's a Kind of Hush" written by Les Reed and Geoff Stephens.

== Reception ==
Through this film, Chiranjeevi gained recognition as an actor.
