= Shivanaga =

- Directed by: K. S. R. Das
- Written by: Chi. Udaya Shankar (dialogues)
- Screenplay by: M. D. Sundar; K. S. R. Das
- Story by: M. S. Narayana; K. S. R. Das
- Produced by: K. Sukumar
- Starring: Arjun Sarja; Malashree; Mukhyamantri Chandru; Doddanna
- Cinematography: Lakshman
- Edited by: K. S. R. Das
- Music by: Rajan–Nagendra
- Production company: Sukumar Art Combines
- Release date: 14 November 1992
- Country: India
- Language: Kannada

Shivanaga is a 1992 Indian Kannada film, directed by K. S. R. Das and produced by K. Sukumar. The film stars Arjun Sarja, Malashree, Mukhyamantri Chandru and Doddanna in the lead roles. The film has musical score by Rajan–Nagendra.

== Cast ==
- Arjun Sarja
- Malashree
- Mukhyamantri Chandru
- Doddanna
- Sundar Krishna Urs
- Sudarshan
- Mysore Lokesh
- Chethan Ramarao
- Rajanna
- Lakshman
- Shanimahadevappa
- Rathnakar
- Chennayya
- Chennanna
- Pandari Bai
- Umashree
- Y. Vijaya
- Jayalalithaa

== Soundtrack ==
Chi. Udaya Shankar wrote the lyrics.

- "Mutthugala Ratnagala" – K. S. Chithra, S. P. Balasubrahmanyam
- "Baaro Nanna" – K. S. Chithra, S. P. Balasubrahmanyam
- "Manmatha Rathriyo – K. S. Chithra, S. P. Balasubrahmanyam
- "Harana Koralalli" – K. S. Chithra
- "Ondu Kottare" – K. S. Chithra
