= Cheppindi Chestha =

1978 Indian Telugu action film by M. S. Manohar

- Poster
- Directed by: M. S. Gopinath
- Screenplay by: M. S. Gopinath
- Story by: M. S. Gopinath
- Produced by: Dr. A. V. Krishna Reddy; Dr. T. V. Mohanaranga Reddy; Dr. S. D. Ahmad; Dr. C. Natesan; M. A. Ajeez
- Starring: Krishna Ghattamaneni; Jayachitra; Narasimharaju; Kavitha
- Music by: Satyam
- Production company: Sarojini Arts
- Release date: 21 September 1978
- Country: India
- Language: Telugu

Cheppindi Chestha (transl. I'll do what I said) is a 1978 Indian Telugu-language action film starring Krishna Ghattamaneni, Jayachitra, Narasimharaju, Kavitha and M. Prabhakar Reddy. The film had musical score by Satyam. The film was written and directed by M. S. Gopinath.

== Cast ==
- Krishna Ghattamaneni
- Jayachitra
- Narasimharaju
- Kavitha
- M. Prabhakar Reddy
- Mamatha
- C. H. Krishna Murthy
- J. V. Ramana Murthy

== Music ==
Cheppindi Chestha

Soundtrack album by Satyam
- Released: 1978
- Recorded: 1978
- Genre: Feature film soundtrack
- Language: Telugu
- Label: Saregama

The soundtrack album comprised 6 tracks composed by Satyam.

=== Tracks ===
1. "Happy Birthday" — S. P. Balasubrahmanyam, P. Susheela
2. "Chinna Daani" — S. P. B., Vijayalakshmi Sharma
3. "Koti Oohala" — S. P. B., P. Susheela
4. "Aadaala Padaala" — P. Susheela, Vijayalakshmi Sharma
5. "Okaanokka Kanne" — S. P. B
6. "Kanne Pillalam" — P. Susheela, Vijayalakshmi Sharma

== Release and reception ==
The film was released on 31 September 1978 was certified with a U certificate from the regional office of censor board at Hyderabad with the certificate dated 15 September 1978.
