= Pelli Choopulu (1983 film) =

- Poster
- Directed by: Parvataneni Sambasiva Rao
- Screenplay by: D. V. Narasa Raju (dialogues)
- Based on: Thooral Ninnu Pochchu (1982) by K. Bhagyaraj
- Produced by: Parvataneni Sasibhusan
- Starring: Chandramohan; Vijayashanti
- Cinematography: Baba Azmi
- Edited by: P. Sambasiva Rao
- Music by: K. V. Mahadevan
- Production company: Sri Sharadhi Studios
- Release date: 1 January 1983
- Country: India
- Language: Telugu

Pelli Choopulu (transl. Matchmaking) is a 1983 Indian Telugu-language romantic drama film directed by Parvataneni Sambasiva Rao. A remake of K. Bhagyaraj's Tamil film Thooral Ninnu Pochchu (1982), it stars Chandramohan and Vijayashanti. The film was released on 1 January 1983 and became a success.

== Cast ==
- Chandramohan
- Vijayashanti
- Rajendra Prasad
- Kaikala Satyanarayana
- Gummadi
- Suryakantham
- Chitti Babu
- Annapurna
- Hema Sundar

== Themes ==
The main theme of Pelli Choopulu is "post-marital blues".

== Soundtrack ==
The music was composed by K. V. Mahadevan, while the lyrics were written by Acharya Aatreya and Jyothirmayi.

Track listing
No.	Title	Singer(s)	Length
1.	"Dhasoham Dhasoham"	S. P. Balasubrahmanyam, P. Susheela	4:33
2.	"Chitikalo Chilakalaa"	S. P. Balasubrahmanyam	5:45
3.	"Unga Ungani Ugge Thagave"	S. P. Balasubrahmanyam	3:47
4.	"Nuvvu Nenu Sagam Sagam"	S. P. Balasubrahmanyam	4:26
5.	"Ninne Ninee Thalachukoni"	S. P. Balasubrahmanyam, P. Susheela	4:00
Total length:			22:31

== Release and reception ==
Pelli Choopulu was released on 1 January 1983. The film was a commercial success, and emerged a breakthrough for Vijayashanti.
