= Mulzim (1988 film) =

- Theatrical release poster
- Directed by: K. S. R. Das
- Written by: Kader Khan (dialogues); Indeevar (lyrics)
- Screenplay by: Paruchuri Brothers
- Produced by: G. Hanumantha Rao; Krishna (Presents)
- Starring: Jeetendra; Shatrughan Sinha; Hema Malini; Amrita Singh; Kimi Katkar
- Cinematography: P. Gopala Krishna
- Edited by: K. R. Mohan Rao
- Music by: Bappi Lahiri
- Production company: Padmalaya Studios
- Release date: 1988
- Running time: 156 minutes
- Country: India
- Language: Hindi

Mulzim (transl. Accused) is a 1988 Hindi-language action film, produced by G. Hanumantha Rao under the Padmalaya Studios banner, presented by Krishna and directed by K. S. R. Das. It stars Jeetendra, Shatrughan Sinha, Hema Malini, Amrita Singh, Kimi Katkar in lead roles. The film's music was composed by Bappi Lahiri. The film is a remake of 1982 Kannada movie Jimmy Gallu which the director of this movie had earlier remade in Telugu as Muddayi (1987).

== Cast ==
- Jeetendra as Vijay
- Shatrughan Sinha as Inspector Neeraj
- Hema Malini as Jailor Sharda
- Amrita Singh as Advocate Mala
- Kimi Katkar as Dr. Rekha
- Aruna Irani as Assistant Jailor
- Kader Khan as Jaago
- Asrani as Hasmukh
- Ranjeet as Jagan
- Suresh Oberoi as Ranjeet
- Bharat Bhushan as Neeraj's Father
- Urmila Bhatt as Neeraj's Mother
- Renu Joshi as Parvati

== Soundtrack ==
Song	Singer
"Adalat Chhod Gaya Insaaf"	Mohammed Aziz
"Paas Mere Aaja, Ya To Mujhko Bula Le"	Salma Agha, Mohammed Aziz
"Kase Raho, Kase Raho, Mujhe Baahon Mein Apni Kase Raho"	Alisha Chinoy, Mohammed Aziz
"Pyar Ka Badla Pyar Se Dena, Aur Na Kuch Chahenge"	Asha Bhosle, Mohammed Aziz
"Sau Saal Tu Jeeti Rahe, Koi Bhi Gham Chhu Na Sake"	Asha Bhosle, Mohammed Aziz
"Chal Gori Pyar Ke Gaon Mein, Duniya Rakh Dunga Paon Mein"	Asha Bhosle, Nitin Mukesh
