= Savati Koduku =

- Theatrical release poster
- Directed by: Y. Ranga Rao
- Written by: Bairani (dialogues)
- Screenplay by: Y. Ranga Rao
- Story by: Y. Ranga Rao
- Produced by: Y. Ranga Rao
- Starring: N. T. Rama Rao; Sowcar Janaki
- Cinematography: K. Janakiram
- Edited by: K. Satyanarayana
- Music by: Satyam; T. V. Raju (supervision)
- Production company: Naveena Chitra
- Release date: 22 February 1963
- Running time: 142 minutes
- Country: India
- Language: Telugu

Savati Koduku (transl. Stepson) is a 1963 Indian Telugu-language drama film, produced and directed by Y. Ranga Rao. It stars N. T. Rama Rao and Sowcar Janaki, with music composed by debutant Satyam and T. V. Raju taking care of supervision.

== Cast ==
- N. T. Rama Rao as Seshu
- Sowcar Janaki as Janaki
- Gummadi as Venkayya
- Relangi as Chal Mohan
- C.S.R as Gundarayudu
- Chadalavada as Subbarayudu
- Vangara as Papaiah Panthulu
- Balakrishna
- Brahmam as Shekar
- Girija as Lalitha
- Hemalatha as Lakshmamma
- Vasanthi as Susheela
- Lakshmi Kantamma
- Rajaratnam as Vanaja

== Soundtrack ==
Savati Koduku

Film score by Satyam
- Released: 1963
- Genre: Soundtrack
- Length: 32:34
- Producer: Satyam

Music composed by Satyam. Lyrics were written by Bairagi.

S. No.	Song title	Singers	length
1	"Ee Desam"	Ghantasala	3:16
2	"Naa Nyanala"	Ghantasala, P. Susheela	3:31
3	"Are Pala Pongula Vayasemo"	Ghantasala, K. Jamuna Rani	4:27
4	"Yemi Sogasu"	Madhavapeddi Satyam, Rama	3:47
5	"Sa Sa Sa Saare"	Ghantasala, S. Janaki	3:30
6	"Zara Tahro"	S. Janaki	3:12
7	"Amma Nee Praname Posinave"	Ghantasala	4:07
8	"Aanaati Haayi"	P. Susheela	3:24
9	"Manasara Neevu"	P. B. Srinivas, P. Susheela	3:20
