= Jimmy Gallu =

- VCD cover
- Directed by: K. S. L. Swamy
- Written by: M. Narendra Babu (Dialogue)
- Screenplay by: M. Ramachandran
- Story by: Venugopal Kasergod
- Produced by: Shashirekha
- Starring: Vishnuvardhan; Sripriya; Lokesh
- Cinematography: Purushottham Valke
- Edited by: N. M. Victor
- Music by: Vijaya Bhaskar
- Production company: Navanidhi Chithra
- Release date: 1982
- Running time: 132 minutes
- Country: India
- Language: Kannada

Jimmy Gallu is a 1982 Indian Kannada-language drama film directed by K. S. L. Swamy and produced by Shashirekha. The story is written by Venugopal Kasaragod. The film stars Vishnuvardhan, Sripriya, Lokesh and Hema Choudhary. The film was widely appreciated for its songs and story upon release. The songs composed by Vijaya Bhaskar were huge hits. The film was remade in Telugu as Muddayi and in Hindi as Mulzim.

== Cast ==
- Vishnuvardhan as Jimmy
- Sripriya as Sudha
- Lokesh as Ganesha
- Hema Choudhary
- Sundar Krishna Urs
- Keerthi Vishnuvardhan
- Vajramuni
- Thoogudeepa Srinivas
- Dwarakish as Vasnatha
- K. S. Ashwath
- Tiger Prabhakar
- Dinesh as Chowdappa
- S Shivaram as Venkanna
- Rajanand as Mutthanna
- N. S. Rao
- Shashikala

== Soundtrack ==
The music of the film was composed by Vijaya Bhaskar and the lyrics were written by Chi. Udaya Shankar. The songs "Thuttu Anna" sung by Vishnuvardhan and the duet song "Deva Mandiradalli" were received extremely well.

Jimmy Gallu

Soundtrack album by Vijaya Bhaskar
- Released: 1982
- Genre: Feature film soundtrack
- Label: Sangeetha Musics

Track listing
No.	Title	Singer(s)	Length
1.	"Thuttu Anna Thinnokke"	Vishnuvardhan
2.	"Haadu Yaava Haadu"	S. P. Balasubrahmanyam, Vani Jairam
3.	"Vayyari Mogava Nodu"	S. P. Balasubrahmanyam, Vani Jairam
4.	"Nanna Janumave"	P. B. Sreenivas, Vani Jairam
5.	"Deva Mandiradalli"	S. P. Balasubrahmanyam, Vani Jairam
