= Naalaaga Endaro =

- Directed by: Eranki Sharma
- Written by: Ganesh Patro
- Screenplay by: Eranki Sharma
- Produced by: K. Prema Ranjith; Kanuri Ranjith Kumar (presenter)
- Starring: G. V. Narayana Rao; Roopa; Pallavi; Hema Sundar
- Cinematography: B. S. Lokanath
- Music by: M. S. Viswanathan
- Production company: R. K. Art Productions
- Release date: 7 December 1978
- Country: India
- Language: Telugu

Naalaaga Endaro! (Like Me, There Are Many!) is a 1978 Telugu-language film directed by Eeranki Sharma. The film won seven Nandi Awards.

== Plot ==
Parvateesam is a retired veena musician with two daughters, Kalyani and Veena. Kalyani has been engaged to her cousin Chalapathi since childhood. However, after she refuses his advances, an angered Chalapathi marries another woman. This shatters the family and Parvateesam tries to find another match for Kalyani. Meanwhile, a blind veena musician named Prabhakar moves in next door. He becomes Parvateesam's student and develops admiration for Kalyani.

Kalyani then finds out that her sister is pregnant. While Veena's lover promises to marry her and his family is also willing, Kalyani is the older sister and thus must be married first, which severely increases the urgency of Kalyani's marriage. As each one of Kalyani's marriage proposals falls through, she finally asks Prabhakar to marry her. He gladly agrees, but unfortunately, he dies in a car accident and Kalyani finally goes mad. Veena reveals the truth to her father and her marriage goes through. At her wedding, a crazed Kalyani runs away and begins throwing rocks at a leaving train.

== Cast ==
- Roopa as Kalyani
- Pallavi as Veena
- G. V. Narayana Rao as Prabhakar
- Lakshmikanth as Chalapathi
- Hema Sundar as Parvateesam
- Veena as Jhansi
- P. L. Narayana as Madanagopala Rao

== Soundtrack ==
All lyrics are written by Acharya Aatreya; all music is composed by M. S. Viswanathan.

No.	Title	Singer(s)	Length
1.	"Anubhavalaku Aadikavyam"	P. Susheela
2.	"Kalyanini Kanulunna Manasuku"	P. Susheela, S. P. Balasubrahmanyam
3.	"Bullemma Nee Kallallo"	P. Susheela, S. Janaki
4.	"Anubhavalaku Aadikavyam - Reprise"	S. P. Balasubrahmanyam
5.	"Okata Renda Mooda"	L. R. Eeswari, Ramola

== Awards ==
Nandi Awards - 1978

- Best Feature Film - Gold - K. Prema Ranjith
- Best Actor - Hema Sundar
- Best Actress - Roopa
- Best Music Director - M. S. Viswanathan
- Best Male Playback Singer - S. P. Balasubrahmanyam
- Best Female Playback Singer - P. Susheela
- Second Best Story Writer - Ganesh Patro
