= Samsaram Oka Chadarangam =

1987 Indian Telugu-language drama film

- Theatrical release poster
- Directed by: S. P. Muthuraman
- Written by: Ganesh Patro (dialogues)
- Screenplay by: S. P. Muthuraman
- Story by: Visu
- Based on: Samsaram Adhu Minsaram (Tamil) by Visu
- Produced by: M. Saravanan; M. Balasubramanian
- Starring: Sarath Babu; Suhasini; Sowcar Janaki; Gollapudi Maruthi Rao; Rajendra Prasad
- Cinematography: T. S. Vinayakam
- Edited by: R. Vital; C. Lancy
- Music by: Chakravarthy
- Production company: AVM Productions
- Release date: 14 January 1987
- Running time: 156 minutes
- Country: India
- Language: Telugu

Samsaram Oka Chadarangam (transl. Family [is] a chess game) is a 1987 Indian Telugu-language drama film produced by M. Saravanan and M. Balasubramanian of AVM Productions and directed by S. P. Muthuraman. The film stars Sarath Babu, Suhasini, Shavukaru Janaki, Gollapudi Maruthi Rao and Rajendra Prasad, with music composed by Chakravarthy. It is a remake of the studio's own Tamil film Samsaram Adhu Minsaram (1986). The film won three Nandi Awards.

== Cast ==
- Sarath Babu as Prakash
- Suhasini as Uma
- Sowcar Janaki as Chilakamma
- Gollapudi Maruthi Rao as Appala Narsayya
- Nutan Prasad as Edmund Samuel
- Rajendra Prasad as Raghava
- Hema Sundar as Jagannatham
- Master Haja Sheriff as Kalidasu
- Dilip as Peter
- Juttu Narasimham as Neelakantham
- Potti Veerayya as Washerman
- Karthik
- Nagabhushan Rao
- Moorthy
- Krishna Chaitanya
- Annapoorna as Godavari
- Mucherla Aruna as Vasantha
- Kalpana as Sarojani
- Lalitha Sarma
- C. H. Vijaya

== Soundtrack ==
Music composed by Chakravarthy. Lyrics were written by Veturi.

Song title	Singers	length
"Samsaram Oka Chadarangam"	S. P. Balasubrahmanyam	8:16
"Jaanki Ramula Kalyanam"	P. Susheela	4:20
"Siri Ke Simantamanta"	S. P. Balasubrahmanyam, P. Susheela	4:10
"Laali Jo Jo"	P. Susheela	4:28
"Jagame Maya"	S. P. Balasubrahmanyam	4:05

== Accolades ==
Nandi Awards

- Best Story Writer – Visu
- Best Supporting Actress – Sowcar Janaki
- Best Child Actor – Master Sravan Kumar
