= Guru Sishyulu (1990 film) =

1990 film by S. P. Muthuraman

- Theatrical release poster
- Directed by: S. P. Muthuraman
- Written by: Ganesh Patro (dialogues)
- Story by: M. D. Sundar
- Based on: Insaf Ki Pukar (Hindi)(1987)
- Produced by: M. Purna Prakash; S. Sambasiva Rao
- Starring: Krishnam Raju; Rajendra Prasad; Sumalatha; Khushbu
- Cinematography: T. S. Vinayakam
- Edited by: R. Vital; S. B. Mohan
- Music by: Ilaiyaraaja
- Production company: Srilatha Art Productions
- Release date: 26 January 1990
- Running time: 145 minutes
- Country: India
- Language: Telugu

Guru Sishyulu (transl. Teacher-Student) is a 1990 Indian Telugu-language action comedy film directed by S. P. Muthuraman. The film stars Krishnam Raju, Rajendra Prasad, Sumalatha and Khushbu, with music composed by Ilaiyaraaja. It is a remake of the Hindi film Insaf Ki Pukar (1987).

== Cast ==
- Krishnam Raju as Raja
- Rajendra Prasad as Babu
- Sumalatha as Geeta
- Khushbu as Chitra
- Gollapudi Maruti Rao as Jairam
- Kota Srinivasa Rao as Inspector Paramashivam
- Sudhakar as Muddu Krishna
- Rama Krishna as Raja Shekaram
- Manorama as Manjula
- Hema Sundar as Narayana Rao
- Maharshi Raghava as Manohar
- Mada Venkateswara Rao
- Telephone Satyanarayana as D.I.G. Prabhu

== Soundtrack ==
Music was composed by Ilaiyaraaja. Lyrics were written by Acharya Aatreya. Music released on Echo Audio Company. All the songs were retained from Guru Sishyan (1988), the Tamil remake of Insaf Ki Pukar, except for "Mattuga Chittuga".

Track listing
No.	Title	Singer(s)	Length
1.	"Dorikavu Dorikavu"	S. P. Balasubrahmanyam	4:22
2.	"Jingidi Jingidi Beauty"	S. P. Balasubrahmanyam, Chitra	4:15
3.	"Edo Nippu"	S. P. Balasubrahmanyam, Chitra	4:13
4.	"Kurchi Kosam Kusti"	S. P. Balasubrahmanyam	4:36
5.	"Mattuga Chittuga"	Chitra	4:18
