= Iddaru Asadhyule =

- Poster
- Directed by: K. S. R. Das
- Starring: Krishna; Rajinikanth; Geetha; Madhavi; Sowcar Janaki
- Music by: Satyam
- Production company: Saradhi Studios
- Release date: 25 January 1979
- Running time: 153 minutes
- Country: India
- Language: Telugu

Iddaru Asadhyule (transl. Both Are Impossible) is a 1979 Indian Telugu-language action film directed by K. S. R. Das and starring Krishna, Rajinikanth, Geetha and Madhavi. The music was composed by Satyam.

== Plot ==
Janaki is wife of a Sepoy. She stays in a village with her son and daughter. One night a drunkard tried to molest her. Her son kills him with axe.

== Cast ==
- Krishna as Tiger Prakash
- Rajinikanth as Inspector Bhaskar
- Geetha as Hema
- Madhavi
- Sowcar Janaki as Janaki
- Allu Ramalingaiah as Tirupathayya
- Kavitha as Raji
- Nagabhushanam as Hanumayya
- Giribabu as Shankar
- Chalam
- Tiger Prabhakar as Jagan
- Sakshi Ranga Rao as Dasu
