= Kabir Lal =

Indian cinematographer and film director

- Occupations: Cinematographer, director
- Years active: 1983–present
- Relatives: Johny Lal (brother)

Kabir Lal is an Indian cinematographer and director, known for his work in Hindi, Kannada, and Telugu-language films.

== Personal life ==
His father was S. S. Lal, who worked as a cinematographer for Telugu, Tamil, and Malayalam films, and his elder brother was Johny Lal, who was also a cinematographer mainly in Hindi cinema.

== Career ==
Kabir Lal initially worked as an operative cameraman for the Kannada film Bhakta Prahlada (1983) and worked alongside his father before making his debut as an independent cameraman for the film Kartavya (1985). He would go on to work on 25 more Kannada films before working in Hindi films. Some of the notable films that he worked on include Pardes (1997), Taal (1999), Kaho Naa... Pyaar Hai (2000), Apne (2007), and Welcome Back (2015).

He initially was to make his debut as a director and worked for a film set in Rajasthan in 2010 but the film did not reach fruition. He made his debut as a director for the Marathi, Bengali, Tamil and Telugu remakes of the Spanish film Julia's Eyes with his son Syed Shahid Lal as the cinematographer. While the Marathi version Adrushya was released in 2022, the Tamil and Telugu versions titled Unpaarvaiyil and Divya Drushti had a delayed direct to television release in 2025 on Sun NXT. The Bengali version titled Antardrishti remains unreleased.

== Filmography ==
=== As cinematographer ===
Year	Title	Language	Notes
1983	Agni Samadhi	Telugu	
1984	Yarivanu	Kannada	
1984	Nayakulaku Saval	Telugu	
1984	Baddi Bangaramma	Kannada	
1985	Veeradhi Veera	Kannada	
1985	Thayiye Nanna Devaru	Kannada	
1985	Nanna Prathigne	Kannada	
1985	Kartavya	Kannada	
1985	Maruthi Mahime	Kannada	
1986	Brahmasthra	Kannada	
1986	Tiger	Kannada	
1986	Agni Parikshe	Kannada	
1987	Athiratha Maharatha	Kannada	
1987	Lorry Driver	Kannada	
1987	Bazar Bheema	Kannada	
1988	Shakthi	Kannada	
1988	Dharmathma	Kannada	
1989	Ondagi Balu	Kannada	
1989	Bidisada Bandha	Kannada	
1989	Muthinantha Manushya	Kannada	
1989	Raja Yuvaraja	Kannada	
1989	Sankranthi	Kannada	
1989	Thayigobba Tharle Maga	Kannada	
1990	Kempu Gulabi	Kannada	
1990	Sri Satyanarayana Pooja Phala	Kannada	
1991	Aditya 369	Telugu	
1991	Golmal Part-2	Kannada	
1992	Guru Brahma	Kannada	
1992	Sriramachandra	Kannada	
1993	Prana Snehitha	Kannada	
1993	Rang	Hindi	
1994	Bhairava Dweepam	Telugu	
1995	Saajan Ki Baahon Mein	Hindi	
1995	Chiranjeevi Rajegowda	Kannada	
1997	Hameshaa	Hindi	
1997	Pardes	Hindi	
1998	Prem Aggan	Hindi	
1999	Hum Aapke Dil Mein Rehte Hain	Hindi	
1999	Taal	Hindi	
2000	Kaho Naa... Pyaar Hai	Hindi	
2000	Pukar	Hindi	Additional cinematography
2000	Khauff	Hindi	
2000	Hamara Dil Aapke Paas Hai	Hindi	
2001	Yaadein	Hindi	
2002	Om Jai Jagadish	Hindi	
2003	Tujhe Meri Kasam	Hindi	
2003	The Hero: Love Story of a Spy	Hindi	
2003	Kabirdas	Telugu	
2004	Ab Tumhare Hawale Watan Saathiyo	Hindi	
2005	Andarivaadu	Telugu	
2006	Style	Telugu	
2007	Apne	Hindi	
2008	Yuvvraaj	Hindi	
2010	Cheluveye Ninne Nodalu	Kannada	
2011	Yamla Pagla Deewana	Hindi	
2011	Naughty @ 40	Hindi	
2011	Love Express	Hindi	
2012	Chaar Din Ki Chandni	Hindi	
2014	Double Di Trouble	Punjabi	
2015	Welcome Back	Hindi	
2016	Warrior Savitri	Hindi	
2017-2018	Porus	Hindi	TV series
2018	Bhaiaji Superhit	Hindi	
2022	Heropanti 2	Hindi	
2024	Hrashwo Deergha	Nepali	
2024	Vanvaas	Hindi	
2026	Welcome to the Jungle	Hindi	

=== As film director ===
- Adrushya (2022; Marathi)
- Unpaarvaiyil (2025; Tamil)
- Divya Drushti (2025; Telugu)

== Accolades ==
- Filmfare Award for Best Cinematography - Taal (1999)
- Zee Cine Award for Best Cinematography - Taal (1999)
