= Dongalu Baboi Dongalu =

1984 Telugu action film by K. S. R. Das

- Directed by: K. S. R. Das
- Written by: Satyanand; Doondy
- Produced by: G. Sambasiva Rao; P. Babji
- Starring: Krishna; Radha; Ambika; Satyanarayana; Prabhakar Reddy
- Cinematography: Pushpala Gopikrishna
- Music by: Satyam
- Production companies: Trimurthy and Sasirekha Films
- Release date: 6 December 1984
- Running time: 148 minutes
- Country: India
- Language: Telugu

Dongalu Baboi Dongalu (transl. Robbers, My God !! Robbers) is a 1984 Indian Telugu-language action film starring Krishna, Radha, Ambika, Satyanarayana and M. Prabhakar Reddy. It was jointly produced by P. Babji and G. Sambasiva Rao. The film directed by K. S. R. Das has musical score by Satyam.

Actor Krishna portrayed the role of twin brothers — Ramu and Krishna. It was one of the earliest Telugu films to show robots and fictional high tech cars. The film was released on 6 December 1984.

== Cast ==
=== Lead Characters ===
- Krishna as Ramu and Krishna
- Radha as Seetha
- Ambika as Satya
- Satyanarayana as Damodaram
- Prabhakar Reddy as Gangulu

=== Other cast ===
- Anjali Devi as Annapoorna
- Annapoorna
- Padmanabham
- Chalapathi Rao as Gavarraju
- Hema Sundar
- Ravi Kondala Rao
- Mada Venkateswara Rao

== Soundtrack ==
The film's soundtrack album comprising 5 tracks was scored and composed by Satyam.

1. Thaagina Maikamlo — S.P.B., G. Anand
2. Oyi Magada — P. Susheela
3. Ososi Kurradana — S.P.B.
4. Neelona Naalona — S.P.B., P. Susheela
5. Nenante — S.P.B., P. Susheela
