= Dav Pech =

1989 Indian Hindi-language action film

- Theatrical release poster
- Directed by: Kawal Sharma
- Written by: Javed Siddique (dialogues); Indeevar (lyrics)
- Screenplay by: K.B.Pathak
- Based on: Roshagadu (1983)
- Produced by: Padmini
- Starring: Jeetendra; Bhanupriya
- Cinematography: V. Durgaprasad
- Edited by: Vijay Pandey
- Music by: Anu Malik
- Production company: Padmini Films Pvt Ltd
- Release date: 17 January 1989
- Running time: 129 minutes
- Country: India
- Language: Hindi

Dav Pech (transl. Manoeuvre) is a 1989 Hindi-language action film, produced by Padmini under the Padmini Films Pvt. Ltd. banner, directed by Kawal Sharma. It stars Jeetendra, Bhanupriya and music composed by Anu Malik. The film is remake of the Telugu movie Roshagadu (1983), starring Chiranjeevi, Madhavi in the pivotal roles.

== Cast ==
- Jeetendra as Bajrangi / Sikander (Dual Role)
- Bhanupriya as Inspector Sunita Verma
- Prem Chopra as K. K.
- Shakti Kapoor as Durjan
- Chandrashekhar as Police Commissioner Surinder Kapoor
- C. S. Dubey as Molester
- Bob Christo as Gambler Wolcott
- Manik Irani as Sampat

== Soundtrack ==
#	Title	Singer(s)
1	"Jalne Laga Hai Ang Ang"	Anu Malik, Alka Yagnik
2	"Devta Hasino Ka"	Shailendra Singh
3	"Ek Ek Zakham Ka" (Sad)	Shailendra Singh, Anupama Deshpande
4	"Jai Siyaram"	Shailendra Singh
5	"Mai Har Janam Teri Behna Banu" (duet)	Sadhana Sargam, Shailendra Singh
6	"Mai Har Janam Teri Behna Banu" (sad)	Sadhana Sargam
7	"Mai Na Bolu, Mera Popat"	Shailendra Singh
