= K. S. R. Das =

Indian film director and editor (1936–2012)

- Born: Konda Subbarama Das; 5 January 1936; Venkatagiri, Nellore, British India (now Andhra Pradesh, India)
- Died: 8 June 2012 (aged 76); Chennai, Tamil Nadu, India
- Occupations: Film director; editor; screenwriter
- Years active: 1966–2000
- Spouse: Nagamani Devi
- Children: 3

Konda Subbarama Das (5 January 1936 – 8 June 2012), popularly known as K. S. R. Das (also spelled as K. S. R. Doss), was an Indian film director and editor known for his work in Telugu and Kannada cinema. Active primarily in the 1970s and 1980s, Das was known for his action films and made significant contributions to South Indian cinema.

Throughout his career, K. S. R. Das directed nearly 100 films across multiple Indian languages, with the majority in Telugu, and additional projects in Kannada, Hindi, Tamil, and Malayalam. He was a pioneer of full-length action films and introduced cowboy-themed films to Indian cinema. Notable films such as Rowdy Rani (1970) and Mosagallaku Mosagadu (1971) set new trends in the action genre. Although primarily recognized for his action films, Das also directed family dramas, showcasing his versatility as a filmmaker.

Das collaborated with several South Indian stars, including N. T. Rama Rao, Krishna, with whom he directed over 30 films, as well as Chiranjeevi, Rajinikanth, Vishnuvardhan. His work was both commercially successful and influential in shaping the action genre in Indian cinema. Das received several awards throughout his career, including the prestigious Puttanna Kanagal Award.

== Early life ==
K. S. R. Das was born on January 5, 1936, in a small village near Venkatagiri in Nellore district, Andhra Pradesh. From a young age, Das was captivated by cinema, frequently traveling to nearby towns to watch films.

== Career ==
=== Early career ===
Das began his career in 1953 as a booking clerk at Krishna Mahal in Guntur district. He later worked as a film representative for Anjali Pictures until 1956, gaining valuable industry experience. He was introduced to S. Bhavanarayana of Gowri Productions, where he worked as an editor, contributing to around 40 films.

Das made his directorial debut with the Telugu film Loguttu Perumallakeruka in 1966, starring Sobhan Babu and Rajasri. Although the film did not achieve commercial success, it marked the beginning of his directorial career.

=== Rise to Prominence ===
Das gained widespread recognition with the 1969 film Takkari Donga Chakkani Chukka, which marked the beginning of his successful collaboration with actor Krishna. Over the years, he directed over 30 films with Krishna, including notable hits like Bangaru Kutumbam (1971) and Mosagallaku Mosagadu (1971). The latter, often regarded as the first Indian cowboy film, became a trendsetter and was dubbed into multiple languages, including English.

Known for his action-oriented films, Das introduced the concept of full-fledged action films to Telugu cinema with Rowdy Raani (1970). His film Mosagallaku Mosagadu was a milestone in Indian cinema. Despite his reputation for action films, Das also demonstrated his versatility by directing family dramas like Annadammula Savaal, Mama-Allulla Savaal, Girija Kalyanam.

=== Kannada cinema ===
In 1975, Das expanded his scope by entering the Kannada film industry. He directed over 20 Kannada films, including significant works such as Sahodarara Savaal, Snehithara Savaal, Chinnadhantha Maga, and Bangaaradha Gudi. His film Khaidhi was a major success and played a crucial role in boosting Dr. Vishnuvardhan's career. Das directed a total of 12 films with Vishnuvardhan and also worked on the acclaimed film Thirugubaana with Ambareesh.

=== Collaborators ===
Throughout his career, K. S. R. Das collaborated with many leading actors in the South Indian film industry, including Chiranjeevi, Rajinikanth, Vishnuvardhan, and Sobhan Babu. Notably, he directed over 30 films with Krishna and 12 films with Vishnuvardhan. Das's prolific output includes around 100 films across Telugu, Kannada, and other languages, solidifying his reputation as one of the most successful directors of his era.

In addition to his primary directorial work, K. S. R. Das also served as a second unit director for action sequences. He contributed to Alluri Seetarama Raju (1974) following the sudden demise of Ramachandra Rao, who had directed the film's initial ten days of shooting. Although Krishna wished to credit Das as the film's director, Das declined, honoring Ramachandra Rao's vision and was credited as the second unit director. For Kaalaantakulu (1978), Das assisted K. Viswanath by directing the action sequences, as Viswanath sought help in areas where Das's expertise was particularly strong.

== Personal life ==
K. S. R. Das married Nagamani Devi in 1964. They had three children: two daughters and a son. The family lived in Bangalore for many years before moving to Chennai later in life. As per Nagamani Devi, despite acquiring some assets after relocating to Bangalore, their investments in films led to significant financial losses.

Das died on June 8, 2012, at Apollo Hospital in Chennai, due to age-related health issues. His son, who worked as a producer in the Kannada film industry, also died in August 2014.

== Legacy ==
K. S. R. Das made a significant impact on the Telugu film industry. His contributions to the action genre and his ability to craft engaging, high-energy narratives established him as a prominent director in the field.

== Awards ==
- Puttanna Kanagal Award from Karnataka State Government

== Filmography ==
Year	Film	Credited as		Language	Notes
Year	Film	Director	Writer	Language	Notes
1966	Loguttu Perumallukeruka	✓	✗	Telugu	
1968	Rajayogam	✓	✗	Telugu	
1969	Raja Simha	✓	✗	Telugu	
1969	Gandaragandudu	✓	✗	Telugu	
1969	Gandaragolam	✓	✗	Telugu	
1969	Takkari Donga Chakkani Chukka	✓	✗	Telugu	
1969	Ukkupidugu	✓	✗	Telugu	
1970	Rowdy Rani	✓	✗	Telugu	
1971	Bangaru Kutumbam	✓	✗	Telugu	
1971	C.I.D. Raju	✓	✗	Telugu	
1971	James Bond 777	✓	✗	Telugu	
1971	Kathiki Kankanam	✓	✗	Telugu	
1971	Mosagallaku Mosagadu	✓	Arudra	Telugu	
1971	Prema Jeevulu	✓	✗	Telugu	
1971	Rowdilaki Rowdeelu	✓	✗	Telugu	
1972	Gunfighter Johnny	✓	✗	Telugu	
1972	Hanthakulu Devanthakulu	✓	✗	Telugu	
1972	Kathula Rathaiah	✓	✗	Telugu	
1972	Penning Saval	✓	✗	Telugu	
1972	Pilla? Piduga?	✓	✗	Telugu	
1972	Pistolwali	✓	✗	Telugu	
1972	Uriki Upakari	✓	✗	Telugu	
1972	Vooriki Upakari	✓	✗	Telugu	
1972	Rani Mera Naam	✓	✗	Hindi	
1973	Apna Farz	✓	✗	Hindi	
1973	Bahadur Ladkiyan	✓	✗	Hindi	
1973	Hifazat	✓	✗	Hindi	
1973	Rani Aur Jaani	✓	✗	Hindi	
1973	Manchivaalaku Manchivadu	✓	✗	Telugu	
1975	Kalla Kulla	✓	M. D. Sundar	Kannada	
1975	Maavoori Ganga	✓	✗	Telugu	
1976	Bhale Dongalu	✓	✗	Telugu	
1976	Doralu Dongalu	✓	✗	Telugu	
1976	Kallanum Kullanum	✓	✗	Telugu	
1976	Bangarada Gudi	✓	Venus Mahija Samasthe	Kannada	
1977	Lakshmi Nivasa	✓	Jayalakshmi Art Enterprises	Kannada	
1977	Sahodarara Savaal	✓	M. D. Sundar	Kannada	
1977	Devudunadu Jagratha	✓	✗	Telugu	
1977	Dongalaku Donga	✓	✗	Telugu	
1977	Eenati Bandham Yenatido	✓	✗	Telugu	
1978	Agent Gopi	✓	✗	Telugu	
1978	Annadammula Savaal	✓	✗	Telugu	Remake of Sahodara Savaal
1978	Dongala Veta	✓	✗	Telugu	
1978	Kiladi Kittu	✓	M. D. Sundar	Kannada	
1978	Chor Ka Bhai Chor	✓	✗	Hindi	
1979	Diler	✓	✗	Hindi	
1979	Iddaru Asadhyule	✓	✗	Telugu	
1979	Evvadabba Sommu	✓	✗	Telugu	
1979	Bangaru Gudi	✓	✗	Telugu	
1979	Captain Krishna	✓	✗	Telugu	
1979	Dongalaku Saval	✓	✗	Telugu	
1979	Yugandhar	✓	Salim–Javed	Telugu	Remake of Hindi film Don
1979	Samajaniki Saval	yes	No	Telugu	
1980	Chesina Basalu	✓	✗	Telugu	
1980	Devudichina Koduku	✓	✗	Telugu	
1980	Mr. Rajanikant	✓	✗	Telugu	
1980	Mama-Allulla Sawal	✓	✗	Telugu	
1980	Sri Venkateswara Vrata Mahatyam	✓	✗	Telugu	
1981	Snehitara Savaal	✓	Ajantha Combines	Kannada	
1981	Jeevakke Jeeva	✓	J. Balasubramaniam	Kannada	
1981	Black Cobra	✓	✗	Telugu	
1981	Rahasya Gudachari	✓	✗	Telugu	
1981	Girija Kalyanam	✓	✗	Telugu	
1981	Mayadari Alludu	✓	✗	Telugu	
1982	Talli Kodakala Anubandham	✓	Cheruvu Anjaneya Sastry	Telugu	
1982	Billa Ranga	✓	✗	Telugu	
1982	Bangaru Koduku	✓	✗	Telugu	
1982	Shamsher Shankar	✓	✗	Telugu	
1982	Karmika Kallanalla	✓	M. D. Sundar	Kannada	
1983	Thirugu Bana	✓	✗	Kannada	
1983	Chinnadantha Maga	✓	✓	Kannada	Remake of Talli Kodukula Anubandham
1983	Naan Ninaithal	✓	✗	Tamil	
1983	Roshagadu	✓	Paruchuri Brothers	Telugu	
1983	Puli Bebbuli	✓	✗	Telugu	
1983	Adadani Saval	✓	✗	Telugu	
1983	Agni Samadhi	✓	✗	Telugu	
1983	Puli Debba	✓	✗	Telugu	
1983	Siripuram Monagadu	✓	✗	Telugu	
1984	Bhale Ramudu	✓	✗	Telugu	
1984	Taqatwala	✓	✗	Telugu	
1984	Dongalu Baboi Dongalu	✓	✗	Telugu	
1984	Nayakulaku Saval	✓	✗	Telugu	
1984	Khaidi	✓	✓	Kannada	Remake of Telugu film Khaidi
1985	Kartavya	✓	✓	Kannada	
1985	Nanna Prathigne	✓	✓	Kannada	
1985	Ide Naa Ghattam	✓	✗	Telugu	
1985	Nerasthudu	✓	✗	Telugu	
1986	Cowboy No. 1	✓	✗	Telugu	
1986	Khaidi Rani	✓	✗	Telugu	
1986	Kutra	✓	✗	Telugu	
1987	Sathyam Shivam Sundaram	✓	✓	Kannada	
1987	Muddayi	✓	✗	Telugu	
1988	Dorakani Donga	✓	✗	Telugu	
1988	Mulzim	✓	✗	Hindi	
1989	Ondagi Balu	✓	✓	Kannada	
1989	Rudra	✓	✗	Kannada	Dubbed in Tamil as Kushboo Kushboothan
1989	Pardhudu	✓	✗	Telugu	
1990	Dharma	✓	✗	Telugu	
1990	Inspector Rudra	✓	✗	Telugu	
1992	Shivanaga	✓	✓	Kannada	Also editor
1992	Nanna Shathru	✓	V. R. Bhaskar	Kannada	
1995	State Rowdy	✓	✗	Kannada	
2000	Billa Ranga	✓	✗	Kannada	
2000	Nagulamma	✓	✗	Telugu	Dubbed in Tamil as Nagathamman
