= Chattamtho Poratam =

- Theatrical release poster
- Directed by: K. Bapayya
- Written by: Paruchuri Brothers
- Produced by: K. Devi Vara Prasad
- Starring: Chiranjeevi; Madhavi; Sumalatha; Rao Gopal Rao
- Cinematography: A. Venkat
- Edited by: Kotagiri Venkateswara Rao
- Music by: K. Chakravarthy
- Release date: January 11, 1985
- Country: India
- Language: Telugu

Chattamtho Poratam (transl. Fight with the Law) is a 1985 Telugu-language drama film starring Chiranjeevi.

== Cast ==
- Chiranjeevi as Ravishankar
- Madhavi as Bharathi
- Sumalatha as Kalyani
- Rao Gopal Rao as Lokeswara Rao
- Allu Rama Lingaiah as Brahmaiah
- P.L. Narayana as Dharma Rao
- Nutan Prasad as Jailor Hitler Sarma
- Prabhakar Reddy as Major Chakrapani
- Suthi Veerabhadra Rao as Public Prosecutor
- Chalapathi Rao as Ramulal
- Silk Smitha as Dancer in song
- Anuradha as Dancer in song
- Sakshi Ranga Rao as Hiter Sarma's father-in-law
- Narra Venkateswara Rao as Inspector
- Kaikala Satyanarayana as Narayana
- Annapoorna as Parvathy
- Sarathi as Bujji Babu
- Hema Sundar as Judge
- P.J. Sarma as Lecturer
- Mamatha as Chamundeswari
- Krishnaveni as Lambodhari

== Soundtrack ==
- "Nenoka Chilakala Kolikini Chusanu"
- "Pilla Pilla Pilla Pelli Kaani Pilla"
- "Chesedi Emundi Chekka Bhajana"
- "Kanchaare Kanchaare Kancha"
- "Kadalirandi Kanaka Durga Laara"

== Legacy ==
The film's title was one of tentative titles for the Mahesh Babu-starrer Spyder.
