= Adrushya =

2022 Indian film by Kabir Lal

- Theatrical release poster
- Directed by: Kabir Lal
- Written by: Screenplay: Kabir Lal; Dialogues: Nikhil Khatare; Chetan Kinjalkar
- Produced by: Ajay Kumar Singh; Rekha Singh
- Starring: Pushkar Jog; Manjari Fadnis; Riteish Deshmukh; Anant Jog
- Cinematography: Shahid Lal
- Edited by: Sanjay Shree Ingale
- Music by: Amar Mohile
- Release date: 20 May 2022
- Running time: 141 minutes
- Country: India
- Language: Marathi

Adrushya (transl. Invisible) is a 2022 Indian Marathi-language thriller film directed by Kabir Lal in his directorial debut and produced by Ajay Kumar Singh. The film stars Pushkar Jog, Manjari Fadnis and Riteish Deshmukh. It is a remake of the 2010 Spanish film Los ojos de Julia.

Adrushya was theatrically released on 20 May 2022. Kabir Lal also simultaneously directed the Bengali version Antardrishti, which remains unreleased.

== Synopsis ==
This is the story of two twin sisters Sayli and Sanika. Suffering from progressive blindness, Sayli hangs herself and Sanika comes to Dehradun with her husband to find out why. Despite having a loving husband Yash, her sister's death does not allow Sanika to remain silent. Doctors have predicted the possibility of her becoming blind like Sayli due to excessive stress. Sanika's eyes are operated after receiving a donor just after Yash dies.

== Cast ==
- Pushkar Jog as Yash
- Manjari Fadnis as Sayali aka Sanika
- Ajay Kumar Singh
- Anant Jog
- Usha Nadkarni as an old lady
- Saurabh Gokhale
- Riteish Deshmukh as Karthik Joshi (special appearance)

== Release ==
=== Theatrical ===
The film was theatrically released on 20 May 2022. Adrushya had been set to be released on 13 May 2022 but it was delayed to avoid clashing with Dharmaveer.

== Production ==
=== Filming ===
Shooting started on 30 January 2021 in Dehradun, India. On 19 July 2021, entire shooting of the film has been completed.

== Reception ==
=== Critical reception ===
Adrushya received negative reviews from critics.

Kalpeshraj Kubal of The Times of India gave the film 2 stars out of 5 and wrote "Adrushya doesn't make an impact on the viewer. This is a film that could have been better, but isn't".

Salonee Mistry of Pune Mirror gave the film 1 stars out of 5 and wrote " What could have been interesting and never seen before Marathi horror film, ‘Adrushya’ is a lost opportunity of taking a brilliant concept to a whole new level, owing to poor execution".

A reviewer of Maharashtra Times gave the film 2 stars out of 5 and wrote "From the beginning to the end, the movie can be predicted at many places. The writing continues to feel weak".

Sanjay Ghaware of Lokmat gave the film 2 stars out of 5 and wrote "Failing to strike the right balance between mystery and thrills, there is nothing special about this film. Therefore, it would be wrong to say that this movie is a must watch".
