= Satyam (composer) =

Satyam సత్యం

Background information
- Born: Chellapilla Satyanarayana; 1933; Andhra Pradesh
- Died: January 1989 (aged 55–56)
- Occupation: Music director
- Instruments: Dholak, Tabla
- Years active: 1960s–1980s

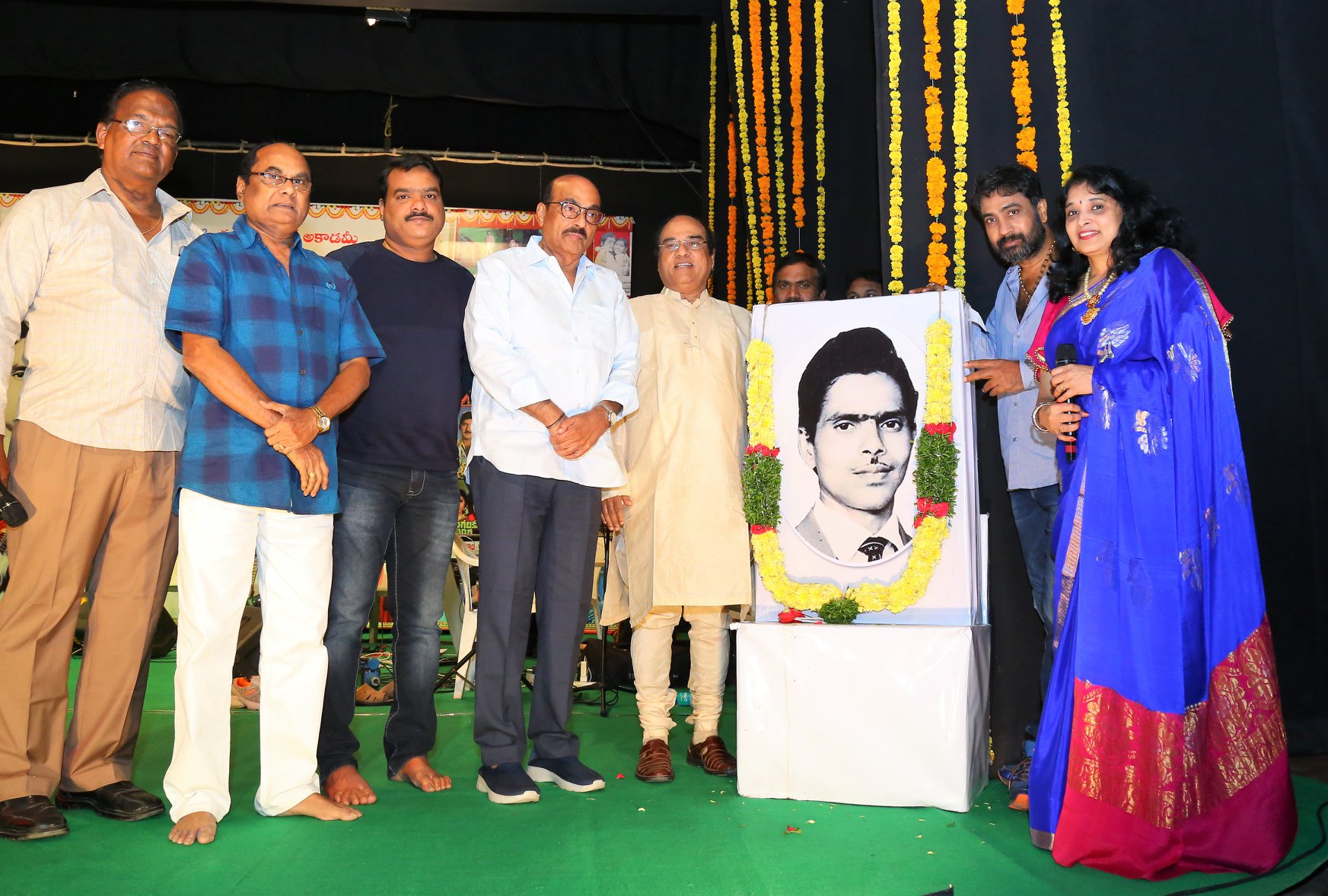
A Tribute concert to Music director Satyam - organized by Sarada Akunuri and YuvaKalavahini Nageswararao in January 2020 Hyderabad

Chellapilla Satyanarayana Sastry (1933 – 12 January 1989), known mononymously as Satyam, was an Indian music composer. He was popular in the Telugu and Kannada film industries from the 1960s to 1980s. Sathyam is best remembered as "Andhra R. D. Burman". He also composed a handful of Bengali, Bhojpuri, and Hindi films.

== Early life and career ==
Satyam was born in Gunanupuram village, Komarada mandal in Vizianagaram district of Andhra Pradesh. He had acted in some plays with popular writer Rajasri and others at Vizianagaram. He later shifted to Madras and worked in the orchestra of P. Adinarayana Rao and T. V. Raju. He worked as an assistant composer in the magnum opus film Suvarna Sundari (1957). He debuted as a music director in the 1963 Kannada film Sri Ramanjaneya Yuddha. His debut film as a full-fledged music director in Telugu cinema was Pala Manasulu (1967), though he was credited as a music director in the 1963 film Savati Koduku under the supervision of T. V. Raju.

Some of his memorable hit songs in Telugu are Ye Divilo Virisina Parijatamo, Gunna Mamidi Komma Meeda, O Bangaru Rangula Chilaka, Kalise Kalla Lona, Tholi Valape Teeyanidi, Aaraneekuma Ee Deepam Karthika Deepam, Gaali Vanalo Vana Neetilo.

His grandson Sri Vasanth is also a music composer who worked for films like Sudigadu (2012). In memory of Satyam, a musical night was organized by Bay Area Telugu Association and Chimata Music in California, United States, in 2009.

Tribute to Music director Satyam was organised by Sreeramulu entertainment, Andhra club in association with singer Sarada Akunuri USA in Chennai in 2015, where Satyam's wife Suguna and his brother's son Trinathrao were graced the event.

in 2020, Singer Sarada Akunuri organized a Tribute concert to music director Satyam in association with Yuvakalavahini in Hyderabad. Satyam's grandson, music director Vasanth attended the event along with director Sri Kodandaramireddy garu. director Sri Yvs Chowdary, music director Sri K.M. Radha Krishnan and singer Anand Gedela.

== Discography ==
=== Telugu ===
Year	Film title	Notes
1957	Suvarna Sundari	Assistant music director
1968	Aggi Meeda Guggilam	
1969	Takkari Donga Chakkani Chukka	
1969	Raja Simha	
1970	Rowdy Rani	
1971	Mattilo Manikyam	
1971	Kattiki Kankanam	
1971	Nammaka Drohulu	
1971	James Bond 777	
1972	Bala Mitrula Katha	
1972	Papam Pasivadu	
1972	Antha Mana Manchike	
1972	Bullemma Bullodu	
1972	Kattula Rattaiah	
1972	Bhale Mosagadu	
1972	Monagadostunnadu Jagratta	
1972	Ooriki Upakari	
1973	Nenu Naa Desam	
1973	Kanne Vayasu	
1973	Jagame Maya	
1973	Bangaru Manasulu	
1973	Manchi Vaallaku Manchivaadu	
1973	Oka Nari Vanda Thupakulu	
1973	Puttinillu Mettinillu	
1973	Vaade Veedu	
1973	Vichitra Vivaham	
1974	Ammayi Pelli	
1974	Nippulanti Manishi	
1974	Gundelu Teesina Monagadu	
1974	Nomu	
1975	Naakoo Swatantram Vachchindi	
1975	Anuragalu	
1975	Ee Kalam Dampathulu	
1975	Lakshmana Rekha	
1975	Pichchodi Pelli	
1975	Maya Machindra	
1975	Swargam Narakam	
1975	Rakta Sambandhalu	
1975	Thota Ramudu	
1976	Bhakta Kannappa	
1976	Bhale Dongalu	
1976	Devudu Chesina Bommalu	
1976	Doralu Dongalu	
1976	Neramu Naadi Kaadu Aakalidi	
1977	Oke Raktam	
1977	Amara Deepam	
1977	Dongalaku Donga	
1977	Andame Anandam	
1977	Manushulu Chesina Dongalu	
1977	Premalekhalu	
1977	Edureeta	
1977	Tholireyi Gadichindi	
1978	3 Puvvulu 6 Kayalu	
1978	Annadammula Savaal	
1978	Dongala Dopidi	
1978	Lawyer Viswanath	
1978	Cheppindi Chestha	
1978	Nayudu Bava	
1978	Ramachilaka	
1979	Iddaru Asadhyule	
1979	Andadu Aagadu	
1979	Korikale Gurralaite	
1979	Lakshmi Pooja	
1979	Chaya	
1979	Dasa Tiringindi	
1979	I Love You	
1979	Karthika Deepam	
1979	Maa Oollo Mahasivudu	
1979	Rama Banam	
1979	Tiger	
1980	Chandipriya	
1980	Devudichcina Koduku	
1980	Kodallu Vastunnaru Jagratta	
1980	Ramudu Parasuramudu	
1980	Aarani Mantalu	
1980	Moodu Mulla Bandham	
1980	Naade Gelupu	
1980	Mahasakthi	
1980	Nakili Manishi	
1980	Sita Ramulu	
1980	Prema Tarangalu	
1981	Taxi Driver	
1981	Swapna	
1981	Attagaari Pettanam	
1981	Prema Natakam	
1981	Gadasari Atta Dogasari Kodallu	
1981	Girija Kalyanam	
1981	Paalu Neellu	
1981	Parvathi Parameswarulu	
1982	Nipputo Chelagaatam	
1982	Bangaaru Kanuka	
1982	Madhura Swapnam	
1982	Talli Kodukula Anubandham	
1982	Patnam Vachina Pativrathalu	
1982	Billa Ranga	
1982	Pratigna	
1982	Gruha Pravesam	
1982	Kadali Vachchina Kanaka Durga	
1982	Korukunna Mogudu	
1982	Swayamvaram	
1982	Aapadbandhavulu	
1983	Dharmaatmudu	
1983	Aalaya Sikharam	
1983	Maro Maya Bazaar	
1983	Puli Debba	
1983	Roshagadu	
1983	Pandanti Kapuraniki 12 Sutralu	
1983	Andhra Kesari	
1984	Gruha Lakshmi	
1984	Kurra Cheshtalu	
1984	Mahanagaramlo Mayagadu	
1984	Dongalu Baboi Dongalu	
1986	Ugra Narasimham	
1986	Sri Vemana Charitra	
1986	Aadi Dampatulu	
1986	Dora Bidda	
1986	Karu Diddina Kapuram	
1986	Kutra	
1986	Iddaru Mithrulu	
1986	Sri Vemana Charitra	
1987	Prema Samrat	
1987	Talambralu	
1987	Bhale Mogudu	
1987	Chandamama Raave	
1987	Dayamayudu	
1988	Dorakani Donga	
1988	Aahuti	
1988	August 15 Raatri	
1989	Sri Ramachandrudu	
1990	Ankusam	

=== Kannada ===
Year	Film title	Remarks	
1963	Sri Ramanjaneya Yuddha		
1966	Mamatheya Bandhana		
1967	Black Market		
1967	Onde Balliya Hoogalu		
1968	Attegondu kaala sosegondu kaala		
1968	Bangalore Mail		
1968	Hoovu Mullu		
1968	Lakshaadheeshwara		
1968	Mamathe		
1968	Sarvamangala		
1969	Bhale Raja		
1969	Choori Chikkanna		
1969	Kaadina Rahasya		
1969	Kaanike		
1969	Maduve! Maduve! Maduve!		
1969	Mathrubhoomi		
1969	Gandhinagara		
1969	Punya Purusha		
1969	Ellellu Naane		
1969	Janmarahasya		
1970	Bhale Kiladi		
1970	C.I.D. Rajanna		
1970	Kallara Kalla		
1970	Modala Ratri		
1970	Mrutyu Panjaradalli Goodachari 555		
1970	Pratheekaara		
1970	Rangamahal Rahasya		
1970	Sedige Sedu		
1971	Bhale Bhaskar		
1971	Kasidre Kailasa		
1972	Jaga Mecchida Maga		
1972	Kranti Veera		
1973	Bangaarada Kalla		
1973	Jwala Mohini		
1974	Veeranjaneya Kathe		
1975	Naga Kanye		
1975	Yashoda Krishna		
1976	Aparadhi		
1977	Nagarahole		
1977	Sahodarara Savaal		
1978	Muyyige Muyyi		
1979	Seetharamu		
1979	I Love You		
1979	Pakka Kalla		
1979	Vijay Vikram		
1980	Moogana Sedu		
1980	Aarada Gaaya		
1980	Yetu Yeduretu		
1980	Nanna Rosha Nooru Varusha		
1980	Haddina Kannu		
1980	Mane Mane Kathe		
1980	Manege Banda Mahalakshmi		
1980	Avali Javali		
1980	Thayiya Madilalli		
1981	Devara Aata		
1981	Swapna		
1981	Keralida Simha		
1981	Simhada Mari Sainya		
1982	Dharma		
1982	Tirugu baana		
1982	Ajith		
1982	Bara		
1982	Sahasa Simha		
1982	Garuda Rekhe	300th film	
1982	Mullina Gulabi		
1982	Oorige Upakari		
1982	Sahasa Simha		
1983	Chinnadantha Maga		
1983	Bekkina Kannu		
1983	Sididedda Sahodara		
1983	Gandugali Rama		
1983	Chandi Chamundi		
1983	Makkale Devaru		
1983	Simha Gharjane		
1983	Raktha Thilaka		
1984	Odeda Haalu		
1984	Ashakirana		
1984	Bekkina Kannu		
1984	Gandu Bherunda		
1984	Chanakya		
1984	Thaayi Naadu		
1984	Prema Jyothi		
1984	Nagabekamma Nagabeku		
1984	Pooja Phala		
1984	Raktha Tilaka		
1984	Lakshmi Kataaksha		
1984	Rowdy Raja		
1984	Sedina Sanchu		
1984	Maha Purusha		
1985	Mahapurusha		
1985	Thayi Kanasu		Vajra Musti
1985	Thayi Thande		
1986	Brahmastra		Namo Oora Devta
1987	Thaayi		
1987	Thaayi Karulu		
1988	Oorige Upakaari		
1988	December 31		
1988	Sahasa Veera		
1990	Pundara Ganda		

=== Tamil ===
- Mudi Soodaa Mannan (1978)
- Swapna (1981)

=== Hindi ===
- Rani Aur Jaani (1973)
- Alakh Niranjan (1975)
- Jhony Meraa Yaar (1973)
- Lady James Bond (1972)
- Gunah Ki Raat (1979)
- Mahashakthi (1980)
- Inspector Rekha (1973)
- Apna Farz (1973)
- Khoon Ki Holi (1979)
- Kaun Sacha Kaun Jutha (1972)

== See also ==
- Vijaya Bhaskar
- T. G. Lingappa
- G. K. Venkatesh
- Rajan–Nagendra
- Upendra Kumar
- M. Ranga Rao
