= Guru Sishyan (1988 film) =

1988 film by S. P. Muthuraman

- Theatrical release poster
- Directed by: S. P. Muthuraman
- Screenplay by: Panchu Arunachalam
- Based on: Insaf Ki Pukar by M. D. Sunder
- Produced by: Meena Panchu Arunachalam
- Starring: Rajinikanth; Prabhu; Seetha; Gautami
- Cinematography: T. S. Vinayagam
- Edited by: R. Vittal; C. Lancy
- Music by: Ilaiyaraaja
- Production company: P. A. Art Productions
- Distributed by: Mangaadu Amman Films
- Release date: 13 April 1988
- Running time: 144 minutes
- Country: India
- Language: Tamil

Guru Sishyan (pronounced [ɡuɾu siʂjan] transl. Master and Disciple) is a 1988 Indian Tamil-language action comedy film directed by S. P. Muthuraman. A remake of the Hindi film Insaf Ki Pukar (1987), it stars Rajinikanth, Prabhu, Seetha and Gautami with Pandiyan, Cho Ramaswamy, Ravichandran, Radha Ravi, Senthamarai, Vinu Chakravarthy and Manorama in supporting roles. The film is about two ex-prisoners who set out to prove the innocence of their wrongfully convicted fellow prisoner. In the process, they uncover a bigger conspiracy.

Meena Panchu Arunachalam produced Guru Sishyan under the production company P. A. Art Productions. The screenplay was written by her husband Panchu Arunachalam. The cinematography was handled by T. S. Vinayagam, the editing was by R. Vittal and C. Lancy, and the art direction was by B. Chalam. The film is Gautami's debut role in Tamil cinema, and the first film in which Rajinikanth and Prabhu co-starred. Filming took place primarily in Mysore and Chennai, and was completed in 25 days.

Guru Sishyan was released on 13 April 1988 during the Puthandu (Tamil New Year) holiday. Despite being released at a time of political turmoil in Tamil Nadu after the death of chief minister M. G. Ramachandran months earlier, Guru Sishyan, which includes many political references, became a commercial success, running in theatres for over 175 days.

== Plot ==
Soon-to-be-released convicts Raja and Babu meet Manohar, who is on death row. He tells them his sister Sumathi was kidnapped by a taxi driver and taken to Muthuraaj, a playboy who raped and killed her. Muthuraaj murdered the taxi driver and, with the help of his elder brother Rajamanickam, ally Jayaram and a corrupt police inspector Nallasivam, framed Manohar. Raja and Babu believe Manohar; Raja stalls his execution by fracturing his left arm. Once released, the two men initiate an elaborate plan.

Under the pretense of an income tax raid, Raja and Babu search Nallasivam's house. They discover he has an abundance of illegally earned wealth, and force his wife Kalyani to sign a paper confirming this. Nallasivam learns about the "raid" at his house and threatens to arrest Raja and Babu, but they gain leverage over him, having created numerous copies of the paper.

Raja later falls in love with Geetha, another police inspector. He tells Babu to "romance" Rajamanickam's daughter Chithra as part of the plan, but it backfires. Raja discovers that Geetha is Nallasivam's daughter and lies to her about being a CBI officer. He blackmails Nallasivam into helping him infiltrate Muthuraaj's services as a new bodyguard. Babu later genuinely falls in love with Chithra, who reciprocates. Though Raja soon reveals his true identity to Geetha, and Nallasivam's corrupt nature, she accepts him.

Pressured by Raja, Nallasivam introduces Babu to Rajamanickam as a millionaire in love with Chithra; Rajamanickam arranges their marriage. During the ceremony, Babu tells Rajamanickam he knows of the group's crimes and says he will only marry Chithra if the group confess in writing. When Rajamanickam refuses, Babu reveals his true identity and cancels the marriage, telling Chithra her father refused to give him the requested dowry. Rajamanickam, Jayaram and Muthuraaj realise that Nallasivam lied to them, and Babu is helping Manohar. They plan revenge.

For over 20 years, Rajamanickam has been trying to uncover a secret that is only known to Kandhasamy, Manohar's father, held captive in his basement. Kandhasamy has amnesia so a rope is used to jolt his memory. It succeeds but Kandhasamy refuses to tell Rajamanickam. Jayaram believes Kandhasamy will only tell Babu because he is helping Manohar. Babu, now their prisoner, is taken to the basement. Raja follows to watch over Babu, and they secretly rescue Kandhasamy and his wife Padma and escape.

While conversing with Padma, Raja realises he is Kandhasamy's first son who went missing years ago during a school trip. Babu recognises Kandhasamy as the murderer of his parents and has a fight with Raja. Kandhasamy stops their fight and reveals the truth: he had learned the location of a treasure cave, but wanted to tell only his superior, IG Sriram. Rajamanickam imprisoned Kandhasamy and his family to seek the location, but he refused. Rajamanickam then murdered Sriram and his wife while disguised as Kandhasamy, sparing their son Babu so that he could blame him. The family escaped, and Padma reveals that they were recaptured after Manohar's arrest before being rescued by Raja and Babu. On learning the truth, Raja and Babu reunite and swear revenge.

Geetha and Chithra join Raja and Babu in their plan to avenge. Chithra draws Rajamanickam to a meeting with Raja and Babu. At the instigation of Jayaram, he agrees to sign a paper incriminating Muthuraaj in exchange for the location to the cave, which will be the "dowry" for Chithra and Babu's marriage. Chithra records Rajamanickam and Jayaram's conversation on tape; she gives it to Muthuraaj, who plans revenge along with Nallasivam.

Kandhasamy, Rajamanickam, Jayaram, Babu and Raja reach the cave and find many gold bars. Rajamanickam signs the paper as promised, but Raja and Babu intend to have him arrested for his crimes. Soon after, Muthuraaj and Nallasivam arrive and create chaos with thugs and bombs; Rajamanickam and Jayaram are killed while Raja, Babu and Kandhasamy escape. Muthuraaj and Nallasivam drive away with many gold bars but are stopped by Raja and Babu, and arrested by Geetha. Manohar, now fully healed, is exonerated.

== Cast ==
- Rajinikanth as Raja
- Prabhu as Babu
- Seetha as Chithra
- Gautami as Geetha
- Pandiyan as Manohar
- Cho as Jayaram
- Ravichandran as Rajamanickam
- Radha Ravi as Muthuraaj
- Senthamarai as Kandhasamy
- Vinu Chakravarthy as Nallasivam
- Manorama as Kalyani
- K. Natraj as Solomon
- LIC Narasimhan as Sriram
- Nagaraja Chozhan as the taxi driver
- Padmasri as Padma
- Sudha as Sumathi
- K. S. Jayalakshmi as the call girl

== Production ==
=== Development ===
When filmmaker and writer Panchu Arunachalam was in financial crisis, director S. P. Muthuraman suggested actor Rajinikanth to collaborate with Arunachalam for a film. Rajinikanth agreed and offered to give a call-sheet of 10 days, asking Muthuraman to prepare a story. Muthuraman objected, saying that if Rajinikanth did a "guest role", the audience would not accept it and distributors would not buy the film, meaning low chances of profit. Muthuraman asked Rajinikanth to give 25 call-sheet days and said he would finish the film within that time; the average Tamil film then would take 45 days to film.

Muthuraman had seen Insaf Ki Pukar (1987), a Hindi film with two heroes. He decided to remake this film in Tamil and told Rajinikanth 25 days was enough. Rajinikanth signed on the film but said he would not act for longer than the given dates. The film was produced by Arunachalam's wife Meena under their own company P. A. Art Productions, while Arunachalam wrote the screenplay. Cinematography was handled by T. S. Vinayagam, editing by R. Vittal and C. Lancy, and art direction was by B. Chalam. Arunachalam's son Subbu Panchu worked as an assistant production manager for the film.

=== Casting and filming ===
Muthuraman said he made Guru Sishyan to exploit Rajinikanth's flair for comedy. Rajinikanth and Prabhu were cast as Raja and Babu. This was the first film in which the two actors were seen together onscreen; though they had first acted together in Dharmathin Thalaivan, it was released later in 1988. Jayashree was initially cast as the police inspector Geetha, but she later backed out due to her marriage. The role went to Gautami; it marked her debut in Tamil cinema. Ravichandran played the antagonist Rajamanickam, deviating from the heroic roles he was previously known for. Padmasri plays the role of Raja's mother, and was not hesitant to play an elderly role.

Principal photography began with the filming of the song "Jingidi Jingidi" at VGP Universal Kingdom, Chennai. Gautami was initially nervous dancing with Rajinikanth in "Jingidi Jingidi" because it was the first time they acted together so it was decided to film non-dancing scenes for two days then film the dance. Choreographer Puliyur Saroja trained Gauthami, who was able to dance convincingly. Many of the film's scenes were shot in Mysore, as filming in Chennai turned problematic. Initially, the script did not have a fight scene for Prabhu. At Rajinikanth's insistence, the fight scene intended for him was later given to Prabhu. The song "Kandu Pudichen", picturised on Rajinikanth and Gauthami, was shot in a day.

The climactic fight sequence was planned to be filmed in the Borra Caves at Araku Valley, but because Rajinikanth's call-sheet dates were nearing the end and a round-trip to Araku Valley would take longer, Chalam designed an identical cave set in Chennai. The scene in which Raja and Babu escape through a tunnel while being pursued by a rolling boulder was based on a similar scene from Raiders of the Lost Ark (1981). While Rajinikanth had given a call-sheet of 25 days, all his scenes were filmed in 23 days; he stayed for the remaining two days, during which he moved the trolley for the song "Vaa Vaa Vanji", which was picturised on Prabhu and Seetha (who played Babu's love interest Chithra), and filmed at Brindavan Gardens. The final length of the film is 3,996.19 metres (13,110.9 ft).

== Themes ==
Film critic Naman Ramachandran considers the film to have an "overt political message". He, Jeeva Sahapthan of Patrikai and writer S. Rajanayagam interpret the scene in which many convicts fight for the chief's chair and Raja sings "Naatkaalikku Sandai Podum Naamellam Paithiyam Thaanda" (People who fight for a chair are mad) as a reference to infighting that occurred within the political party All India Anna Dravida Munnetra Kazhagam (AIADMK) following the death of Tamil Nadu chief minister M. G. Ramachandran on 24 December 1987; after his death, the AIADMK was split into two factions. Jeeva Sahapthan notes that Raja's dialogue "Mike aala pesaradhu andha kaalam, mike aala adikkaradhu indha kaalam" (Talking through the microphone is old, beating with the microphone is new) references several incidents in which people were beaten with microphones.

A writer from Hindu Tamil Thisai using the nom de plume "Cinema Pithan" compared Guru Sishyan to many other Rajinikanth films from the 1980s like Polladhavan (1980), Moondru Mugam (1982), Naan Mahaan Alla (1984) and Naan Sigappu Manithan (1985) because revenge is a mutual theme in them, while other sources identify it as a treasure hunt film in the vein of the Indiana Jones films. S. Rajanayagam writes that the scene in which the jailer advises Raja not to visit the jail again, and Raja asks why he should have to come to the jail if those outside are good, mirrors many films in which Rajinikanth's character submits himself to the law and gets punished as a routine but does not generally feel guilty about his petty crimes and is depicted as taking for granted that minor offences are a part of daily living.

Writing for Firstpost in 2014, S. Srinivasan said the film says people with "families and reputations and clean linen shirts to protect" should normally "avoid messing up with the poor, who have nothing to lose, or the rich, who can swat us like a fly". In another Firstpost article, Apoorva Sripathi noted that the hand gestures Jayaram (Cho Ramaswamy) makes in one scene in which he is in deep thought were actually symbols of the AIADMK, Dravida Munnetra Kazhagam and the Indian National Congress. She called this an example of Ramaswamy making references to politics in his films. Film historian Mohan Raman said, "Cho was one person who could spout political dialogues and display his brand of wit ... His comedy in [Guru Sishyan] was satire-driven ... maybe because he was essentially a stage actor". Rajanayagam states that "Kandu Pudichen" replaying in part at the film's end signifies a trend in Tamil cinema wherein the last song to be played is usually heard earlier in the film.

== Soundtrack ==
The music for Guru Sishyan was composed by Ilaiyaraaja. Vaali wrote the lyrics of all songs except "Jingidi Jingidi", which Ilaiyaraaja himself wrote. The soundtrack was released by Echo Records. "Kandu Pudichen" is set in the Carnatic raga known as Shubhapantuvarali. Unlike most Shubhapantuvarali songs, which are composed with melancholic overtones, it was written to be "playful" and "fun". The song attained popularity, as did "Naatkaalikku Sandai" despite its anti-political lyrics, and "Jingidi Jingidi" with its nonsensical lyrics.

Track listing
No.	Title	Lyrics	Singer(s)	Length
1.	"Kandu Pudichen"	Vaali	S. P. Balasubrahmanyam	04:34
2.	"Vaa Vaa Vanji"	Vaali	S. P. Balasubrahmanyam, K. S. Chithra	04:28
3.	"Naatkaalikku Sandai"	Vaali	Malaysia Vasudevan, Mano	04:30
4.	"Jingidi Jingidi"	Ilaiyaraaja	Mano, K. S. Chithra	04:27
5.	"Uthama Puthiri Naanu"	Vaali	Swarnalatha	04:13
Total length:				22:12

== Release and reception ==
Guru Sishyan was released on 13 April 1988 during Puthandu, the Tamil New Year holiday, and was distributed by Mangaadu Amman Films. According to trade analyst Sreedhar Pillai, the overseas rights of the film were sold for ₹1 lakh (equivalent to ₹11 lakh or US$12,000 in 2023); Prathibha Parameswaran of Scroll.in, however, said the film "did a business of just about a lakh of rupees", its distributor having acquired its overseas rights for ₹60,000 (equivalent to ₹690,000 or US$7,100 in 2023).

On 24 April 1988, the review board of the magazine Ananda Vikatan praised Guru Sishyan for its comedy and Rajinikanth's performance—especially his English malapropisms—giving it a rating of 40 out of 100. N. Krishnaswamy of The Indian Express wrote, "Rajinikanth and Prabhu enjoy to the hilt playing their light-hearted roles, lissom newface Gautami and short and square [Seetha] prance around with abandon. [Ilaiyaraaja's] numbers are pleasant and add sparkle to the song-and-dance sequences." Despite being released at a time of political turmoil in Tamil Nadu after M. G. Ramachandran's death, the film became a commercial success, running in theatres for over 175 days, thereby becoming a silver jubilee film. (Note: A silver jubilee film is one that completes a theatrical run of 25 weeks or 175 days.)

== Legacy ==
Guru Sishyan brought Gautami to instant stardom. Many of Rajinikanth's English malapropisms such as "Es-kiss me" or "Yes kiss me" instead of "Excuse me", "underwear" instead of "understand", "jaundice" instead of "justice", and "ABC" instead of "CBI" gained popularity, as did the scene where Raja and Babu conduct a fake income tax raid. S. Rajanayagam wrote that the imaging of Rajinikanth's politics can be seen in four phases, where the second covers "the period from Guru Sishyan (1988) to Baatshaa [sic] (1995)". Naman Ramachandran noted that after the release of Guru Sishyan, "overt political commentary would become increasingly common in Rajinikanth's films". Guru Sishyan was later screened at Chennai's AGS Cinemas on 27 September 2010 as part of their "Rajnikanth Film Festival".

In his review of Sundara Travels (2002), S. R. Ashok Kumar of The Hindu compared Vinu Chakravarthy's comical police character to Nallasivam. The 2010 film Guru Sishyan, directed by Sakthi Chidambaram, has a different storyline from its 1988 namesake. Sakthi Chidambaram said, "the story demanded such a title, we short-listed 50 titles, finally decided we could use the old one". In Engitta Modhathey (2017), "Naatkaalikku Sandai" plays in a theatre where, at the same time, there is a scuffle between Ravi (Natty Subramaniam) and Mandhramoorthy (Radha Ravi) on who is bigger.

== Bibliography ==
- Rajanayagam, S. (2015). Popular Cinema and Politics in South India: The Films of MGR and Rajinikanth. Routledge. ISBN 978-1-138-82203-0.
- Ramachandran, Naman, ed. (2012). Rajinikanth 12.12.12: A Birthday Special. Kasturi & Sons Ltd.
- Ramachandran, Naman (2014) [2012]. Rajinikanth: The Definitive Biography. New Delhi: Penguin Books. ISBN 978-81-8475-796-5.
- Ramki, J. (2005). Rajini: Sapthama? Sagaapthama? (in Tamil). Kizhakku Pathippagam. OCLC 741479408.
