= Ambareesh filmography =

Ambareesh was an Indian actor who appeared predominantly in Kannada films. Besides Kannada, he has also acted in Tamil, Malayalam, Telugu and Hindi films.

== Kannada films ==
List of Ambareesh Kannada films and roles
Year	Title	Role	Notes	Ref.
1955	Shivasharane Nambekka		Child artist	
1972	Naagarahaavu	Jaleela		
1973	Bangarada Kalla		Guest appearance	
1973	Seethe Alla Savithri	Lachha		
1974	Chamundeshwari Mahime	Nagappa		
1975	Mahadeshwara Pooja Phala	Kumar		
1975	Shubhamangala	Mooga		
1975	Bhagya Jyothi			
1975	Nagakanye			
1975	Onde Roopa Eradu Guna	Dada		
1975	Bili Hendthi		Guest appearance	
1975	Devara Kannu	Sridhar		
1976	Hudugatada Hudugi	Kumar		
1976	Hosilu Mettida Hennu			
1976	Bangarada Gudi	Kamalesh		
1976	Kanasu Nanasu	Ramesh	Cameo	
1977	Dhanalakshmi			
1977	Kudure Mukha			
1977	Nagarahole	Driver Antony		
1977	Maagiya Kanasu			
1977	Manasinanthe Mangalya			
1977	Mugdha Manava			
1977	Chinna Ninna Muddaduve			
1977	Kumkuma Rakshe			
1977	Banashankari			
1978	Halli Haida			
1978	Havina Hejje			
1978	Muyyige Muyyi	Peter		
1978	Siritanakke Savaal			
1978	Paduvaaralli Pandavaru	Kariya		
1978	Prathima			
1978	Sneha Sedu			
1978	Kiladi Jodi			
1978	Amarnath	Amar		
1978	Balu Aparoopa Nam Jodi	Ajay		
1978	Priya	Bharath	Simultaneously shot in Tamil	
1979	Pakka Kalla			
1979	Kamala			
1979	Putani Agent 123	Karate Master		
1979	Savathiya Neralu			
1980	Dhairya Lakshmi			
1980	Vajrada Jalapatha	Dorai		
1980	Ondu Hennu Aaru Kannu	Ravi		
1980	Subbi Subbakka Suvvalali			
1980	Nyaya Neethi Dharma	Kumar		
1980	Driver Hanumanthu	Church Father	Guest Appearance	
1981	Leader Vishwanath	Vishwanath		
1981	Ranganayaki	Ramanna		
1981	Antha	Sushil Kumar/Kanwarlal	Karnataka State Film Award (Special Jury Award)	
1981	Maha Prachandaru			
1981	Snehitara Savaal	Kumar		
1981	Bhaari Bharjari Bete	Naga		
1981	Avala Hejje			
1982	Shankar Sundar	Shankar/Sundar	Dual roles	
1982	Prema Matsara	Kiran		
1982	Maava Sose Savaal			
1982	Snehada Sankole			
1982	Ajith	Ajith		
1982	Tony	Tony Malcolm		
1982	Khadeema Kallaru	Raja		
1983	Thirugu Baana			
1983	Aasha			
1983	Jaggu	Jaggu	Double role	
1983	Hosa Theerpu	Raja		
1983	Avala Neralu			
1983	Chakravyuha	Amarnath		
1983	Matthe Vasantha			
1983	Maneli Ramanna Beedili Kamanna			
1983	Geluvu Nannade			
1983	Hasida Hebbuli	Rajanna		
1983	Dharma Yuddha			
1984	Gajendra	Gajendra		
1984	Naane Raja	Raghu	Cameo	
1984	Gandu Bherunda	Bijju		
1984	Onti Dhwani			
1984	Guru Bhakti			
1984	Sidilu			
1984	Kalinga Sarpa		Guest appearance	
1984	Rowdy Raja			
1984	Mooru Janma	Usta / Dhananjaya / Doga		
1984	Shapatha	Arjun		
1984	Onde Raktha			
1985	Goonda Guru			
1985	Dharma		Guest appearance	
1985	Guru Jagadguru	Guru		
1985	Aahuti			
1985	Amara Jyothi	Harikrishna		
1985	Shabash Vikram	Vikram		
1985	Devara Mane			
1985	Sneha Sambandha	Krishna		
1985	Giri Baale	Venkatesh		
1985	Chaduranga	Bharath		
1985	Devarelliddane			
1985	Masanada Hoovu	Bangaru	Karnataka State Film Award for Best Supporting Actor	
1985	Mamatheya Madilu	Dr Ravi		
1986	Madhura Bandhavya			
1986	Sathkara			
1986	Mrugaalaya	Vijay Kumar		
1986	Brahmastra	Prasanna / Uday	Dual roles	
1986	Preethi	M. P. Ashok / Anand	Dual roles	
1986	Matthondu Charitre			
1986	Bete			
1986	Vishwaroopa			
1987	Premaloka	Hotel supplier	Guest appearance	
1987	Bazar Bheema			
1987	Olavina Udugore	Dr. Suresh	Filmfare Award for Best Actor	
1987	Prema Kadambari	Balu		
1987	Mr. Raja	Raja		
1987	Poorna Chandra	Chandra		
1987	Anthima Theerpu			
1987	Digvijaya	Inspector Arjun		
1987	Inspector Krantikumar	Kranti Kumar		
1987	Bedi	Chakravarthy		
1987	Bandha Muktha			
1987	Aapadbhandava			
1988	Brahma Vishnu Maheshwara	Doctor Brahmendra		
1988	Praja Prabhutva	Narasimha		
1988	Arjun	Arjun		
1988	Nava Bharatha			
1988	Elu Suttina Kote			
1988	Vijaya Khadga			
1988	New Delhi	G. Krishnamoorthy		
1988	Sangliyana	Amarnath		
1988	Ramanna Shamanna	Rama		
1988	Thayigobba Karna	Sanjay		
1989	Hongkongnalli Agent Amar	Amar		
1989	Jackey			
1989	Guru			
1989	Gandandre Gandu			
1989	Avatara Purusha			
1989	Indrajith	Indrajith		
1989	Samsara Nouke	Rajesha /Amar		
1989	Anthintha Gandu Nanalla	Dayananda		
1989	Nyayakkagi Naanu			
1989	Onti Salaga	Shankar aka Onti Salaga		
1989	Jai Karnataka	Arun		
1989	Raja Yuvaraja			
1989	Jayabheri			
1990	Matsara	Jayanth/Ravi	Double role	
1990	Nammoora Hammera	Krishna		
1990	Ranabheri	Shankar		
1990	Aasegobba Meesegobba	Himself	Special appearance	
1990	Kempu Surya			
1990	Kempu Gulabi			
1990	Chakravarthy	Shankar Narayan Bhat		
1990	Ekalavya			
1990	Rani Maharani	Shivu		
1990	Utkarsha		Dubbed in Telugu as Utkarsha	
1990	Thrinethra	Himself	Cameo	
1991	Hrudaya Haadithu	Dr. Prasad		
1991	Kadana			
1991	Neenu Nakkare Haalu Sakkare	Himself	Guest appearance	
1991	Garuda Dhwaja	Inspector Garuda		
1991	Kalachakra			
1991	Puksatte Ganda Hotte Thumba Unda	Manu		
1991	Gandu Sidigundu			
1991	Rowdy & MLA	Shivu		
1991	Aranyadalli Abhimanyu	Nagaraja/Abhimanyu		
1992	Entede Bhanta			
1992	Mysore Jaana	Anand		
1992	Solillada Saradara	Krishna		
1992	Saptapadhi	Sudhakar		
1992	Bhanda Nanna Ganda	Himself	Guest appearance	
1992	Prema Sangama			
1992	Megha Mandara	Mandar		
1992	Mannina Doni	Karthik		
1992	Mallige Hoove			
1993	Suryodaya			
1993	Olavina Kanike			
1993	Vasantha Poornima			
1993	Midida Hrudayagalu	Rajanna		
1993	Hrudaya Bandhana	Ashok Kumar		
1993	Munjaneya Manju			
1994	Musuku			
1994	Odahuttidavaru	Sridhar		
1994	Gold Medal	Inspector Arjun		
1994	Mandyada Gandu	Krishna		
1994	Vijaya Kankana	Amar		
1995	Professor			
1995	Kalyanotsava	Seenu		
1995	Betegara			
1995	Balondu Chaduranga			
1995	Karulina Kudi	Vasu		
1995	Operation Antha	Kanwarlal-Sushil Kumar		
1995	Mr. Abhishek	Abhishek		
1996	Mounaraga			
1996	Palegara		Dual roles	
1997	Rangena Halliyage Rangada Rangegowda	Rangegowda / Ranganath		
1997	Baalida Mane			
1997	April Fool			
1997	Prema Geethe	Krishna		
1999	Habba	Ambi		
2000	Devara Maga	Rajegowda		
2001	Vande Matharam	Yashwanth		
2001	Diggajaru	Wodeya		
2001	Sri Manjunatha	Maharaja Ambikeshwar		
2001	Prema Rajya			
2002	Mutthu	Devappa Nayaka		
2003	Gadibidi Brothers	—N/a	As presenter	
2003	Annavru	Amarnath "Anna"		
2004	Gowdru	Rame Gowda		
2005	Karnana Sampathu	Himself		
2006	Thandege Thakka Maga	Chowdaiah		
2006	Savira Mettilu			
2006	Pandavaru	Kempe Gowda		
2006	Care of Footpath	Himself	Uncredited guest appearance	
2006	Kallarali Hoovagi	Madakari Nayaka		
2007	Ee Preethi Yeke Bhoomi Melide	Undertaker	Guest appearance	
2009	Vayuputra	Chowde Gowda		
2010	Thipparalli Tharlegalu	Kanwarlal	Guest appearance	
2010	Veera Parampare	Varade Gowda		
2011	Swayam Krushi	Chief Minister		
2012	Katariveera Surasundarangi	Yama		
2012	Rana	Amarnath		
2012	Sri Kshetra Adichunchanagiri	King	Guest appearance	
2012	Drama	Astrologer	Guest appearance	
2013	Varadhanayaka	Himself	Guest appearance	
2013	Bulbul	Amarnath	Nominated, Filmfare Award for Best Supporting Actor – Kannada	
2014	Ambareesha	Kempegowda		
2016	Happy Birthday	Himself	Guest appearance	
2016	Doddmane Hudga	Doddmane Rajeeva		
2018	Rajasimha	Himself	Guest appearance	
2018	Ambi Ning Vayassaytho	Ambi/Ambarish	Filmibeat Award for Best Actor - Kannada	
2019	Kurukshetra	Bheeshma	Posthumous release	
2026	Raktha Kashmira	Himself	Posthumous final film release; Special appearance in the song "Star Star"	

== Other language films ==
List of Ambareesh other language films and roles
Year	Title	Role	Language	Notes	Ref.
1973	Pookkari	Ravi	Tamil	credited as Amarnath	
1974	Zehreela Insaan	Jaleel	Hindi		
1974	Vishnu Vijayam	John	Malayalam		
1978	Thai Meethu Sathiyam	Zamindar	Tamil		
1978	Priya	Bharath	Tamil	Simultaneously shot in Kannada	
1982	Gaanam	Aravindakshan Bhagavathar	Malayalam		
