= List of Kannada films of 1977 =

== Top-grossing Films ==
Rank	Title	Collection	Ref.
1.	Sanaadi Appanna	₹4.25 crore (₹132.3 crore in 2025)	
2.	Babruvahana	₹4 crore (₹124.5 crore in 2025)	
3.	Nagarahole	₹3.5 crore (₹108.83 crore in 2025)	
4.	Kokila	₹2 crore (₹62.25 crore in 2025)	
5.	Sahodarara Savaal	₹1 crore (₹31.13 crore in 2025)	

== List ==
The following is a list of films produced in the Kannada film industry in India in 1977, presented in alphabetical order.

Title	Director	Cast	Music
Anuroopa	P. Lankesh	Ananth Nag, Aarathi, C. R. Simha	Rajeev Taranath
Babruvahana	Hunsur Krishnamurthy	Rajkumar, Jayamala, B. Saroja Devi, Kanchana, Ramakrishna, Vajramuni	T. G. Lingappa
Banashankari	K. S. L. Swamy	Kalyan Kumar, K. R. Vijaya, Jayanthi, Ambareesh, K. S. Ashwath	Vijaya Bhaskar
Bayasade Banda Bhagya	R. Ramamurthy	Vishnuvardhan, Manjula, Ram Gopal	Rajan–Nagendra
Bhagyavantharu	H. R. Bhargava	Rajkumar, B. Saroja Devi, Balakrishna, Ashok	Rajan–Nagendra
Chandamarutha	Pattabhirama Reddy	M. Bhaktavathsala, Snehalatha Reddy, Manjula, Ashok Mandanna	Konark Reddy
Chinna Ninna Muddaduve	A. M. Sameulla	Vishnuvardhan, Jayanthi, Ambareesh, Pramila Joshai	Salil Chowdhury
Deepa	C. V. Rajendran	Manjula, Ashok, Leelavathi, Hema Choudhary	Vijaya Bhaskar
Devara Duddu	K. S. L. Swamy	Srinath, Rajesh, Jayanthi, Shivaram, Hema Choudhary	Rajan–Nagendra
Devare Dikku	Basavaraj Kesthur	Bharathi, Ramgopal, Jaisimha, Balakrishna	Vijaya Bhaskar
Dhanalakshmi	K. S. Satyanarayana	Srinath, Manjula, Dwarakish, Shivaram, Ambareesh	M. Ranga Rao
Ella Hanakkagi	B. C. Lal	Jayaprakash, Narasimharaju, M. R. Ravi, Dinesh, Jayaprabha	T. V. Babu
Galate Samsara	C. V. Rajendran	Rajinikanth, Manjula, Vishnuvardhan, Shubha, Dwarakish	G. K. Venkatesh
Ganda Hendathi	K. S. Prakash Rao	Srinath, Jayanthi, Manjula, Dinesh, Shivaram	Vijaya Bhaskar
Geddavalu Naane	Aaroor Pattabhi	Ashok, Srividya, Shivaram, Manorama	M. Ranga Rao
Ghatashraddha	Girish Kasaravalli	Meena Kuttappa, Ajith Kumar, Jagannath, Narayana Bhat	B. V. Karanth
Giri Kanye	Dorai-Bhagavan	Rajkumar, Jayamala, Vajramuni, Thoogudeepa Srinivas, Tiger Prabhakar	Rajan–Nagendra
Harake	K. Nagesh	Roopesh Kumar, Pramila Joshai, Harsha, Sudheer, Vijayashree, Jayakala	Vijaya Bhaskar
Hemavathi	Siddalingaiah	G. V. Iyer, Udaya Kumar, Lokanath, Meera, M. V. Sharada	L. Vaidyanathan
Kaadgicchu	S. N. Singh	Ramgopal, Dwarakish, Ambareesh, Shubha, Udaya Chandrika	Saytam
Kakana Kote	C. R. Simha	Lokesh, Srinath, Lokanath, Lavanya	C. Ashwath
Kanneshwara Rama	M. S. Sathyu	Ananth Nag, Shabana Azmi, Amol Palekar, B. V. Karanth, Tom Alter, C. R. Simha	B. V. Karanth
Karavali	Vishukumar	Reeta Anchan, Vishukumar, Srikala Hattangadi	Hemanth Kumar
Kartavyada Kare	Sunand	Udaya Chandrika, Yashraj, B. V. Radha, Dwarakish, Dinesh	G. K. Venkatesh
Kittu Puttu	C. V. Rajendran	Vishnuvardhan, Dwarakish, Manjula, Lokanath	Rajan–Nagendra
Kokila	Balu Mahendra	Kamal Haasan, Mohan, Shoba, Roja Ramani	Salil Chowdhury
Kumkuma Rakshe	S. K. A. Chari	Ashok, Rajinikanth, Manjula, Shivaram	Vijaya Bhaskar
Lakshmi Nivasa	K. S. R. Das	Ramgopal, Padmapriya, Balakrishna, Thoogudeepa Srinivas	T. G. Lingappa
Maagiya Kanasu	K. S. L. Swamy	Srinath, Aarathi	Vijaya Bhaskar
Mugdha Manava	K. S. L. Swamy	Srinath, Kalyan Kumar, Ambareesh	Vijaya Bhaskar
Nagarahole	Rajendra Singh Babu	Vishnuvardhan, Bharathi Vishnuvardhan, Ambareesh, Shivaram	Satyam
Olavu Geluvu	H. R. Bhargava	Rajkumar, Lakshmi, Balakrishna	G. K. Venkatesh
Ondu Premada Kathe	Joe Simon	Rajinikanth, Maanu, L. V. Sharada	T. G. Lingappa
Pavana Ganga	Y. R. Swamy	Srinath, Aarathi, B. V. Radha, Dwarakish	Rajan–Nagendra
Punarmilana	M. R. Vittal	Chandrashekhar, Ramgopal, Indu Shekar, Srilalitha, Joseph D'Souza, B. V. Radha	M. Ranga Rao, K. H. Narayana Swamy
Rishyasringa	V. R. K. Prasad	Suresh Heblikar, Dr. Rathna, Venkatram, A. S. Murthy, G. V. Iyer, Sundarashree	B. V. Karanth
Sahodarara Savaal	K. S. R. Das	Rajinikanth, Vishnuvardhan, Bhavani, Kavitha	Satyam
Sanaadi Appanna	Vijay	Rajkumar, Jayapradha, Ashok	G. K. Venkatesh
Shani Prabhava	Ratnakar - Madhu	Vishnuvardhan, B. Saroja Devi, Bhavani, Sampath	M. Ranga Rao
Shrimanthana Magalu	A. V. Sheshagiri Rao	Vishnuvardhan, Jayanthi, Udaya Kumar, Vajramuni	G. K. Venkatesh
Sose Tanda Soubhagya	A. V. Sheshagiri Rao	Vishnuvardhan, Manjula, Rajesh	G. K. Venkatesh
Sri Renukadevi Mahatme	C. S. Rao	Srinath, B. Saroja Devi, Rajesh	S. Hanumantha
Tabbaliyu Neenade Magane	Girish Karnad, B. V. Karanth	Naseeruddin Shah, Maanu, Sundar Raj, Linda Paula, Om Puri, Lakshmi	Bhaskar Chandavarkar
Thayigintha Devarilla	Y. R. Swamy	Srinath, Jayanthi, Manjula, Lokanath	Rajan–Nagendra

== See also ==
- Kannada films of 1976
- Kannada films of 1978
