= List of Kannada films of 1978 =

== Top-grossing films ==
Rank	Title	Collection	Ref.
1.	Shankar Guru	₹4.5 crore (₹128 crore in 2025)	
2.	Singaporenalli Raja Kulla	₹4.25 crore (₹121 crore in 2025)	
3.	Priya	₹4 crore (₹113.8 crore in 2025)	
4.	Operation Diamond Racket	₹3.5 crore (₹100 crore in 2025)	
5.	Thayige Thakka Maga	₹3 crore (₹85.35 crore in 2025)	
6.	Amarnath	₹2 crore (₹56.9 crore in 2025)	

== List ==
The following is a list of films produced in the Kannada film industry in India in 1978, presented in alphabetical order.

Title	Director	Cast	Music
Aathma Shakti	Raja	M. V. Vasudeva Rao, Rajesh, Shakti Prasad, Prathima	Upendra Kumar
Aluku	KSL Swamy	Ramesh Bhat, C. R. Simha, A. S. Murthy, Sarvamangala	Vijaya Bhaskar
Amarnath	K. Mani Murugan	Ambareesh, Srikala, Dheerendra Gopal, Leelavathi	Vijaya Bhaskar
Anubandha	V. L. Acharya	Madhusudhan, Hema Chowdhary, Pramila Joshai, Saikumar, K. S. Ashwath	M. Ranga Rao
Anuraga Bandhana	Geethapriya	Basant Kumar Patil, Kalyan Kumar, Ambarish, Kalpana, Manjula, Aarathi	Rajan-Nagendra
Aparichita	Kashinath	Suresh Heblikar, Srilalitha, L. V. Sharada	L. Vaidyanathan
Balu Aparoopa Nam Jodi	K. Janakiram	Srinath, Aarathi, Dwarakish, Ambareesh	Ramlal Sehra
Bhale Huduga	T. R. Ramanna	Vishnuvardhan, Manjula, Dwarakish	G. K. Venkatesh
Chithegu Chinthe	M. S. Sathyu	C. R. Simha, Manjula, Paula Lindsay, Shivaram	B. G. Ramanath, Prabhakar Bhadri
Devadaasi	C. V. Raju	Udaya Kumar, Master Hirannayya, Narasimharaju, Jayanthi, Pandari Bai	G. K. Venkatesh
Geejagana Goodu	T. S. Ranga	Hamju Imam, Aarathi Muddayya, M. K. Shankar, H. G. Somashekar Rao	B. V. Karanth
Halli Haida	Amrutham	Srinath, Manjula, Roja Ramani, Shubha, K. S. Ashwath	M. Ranga Rao
Havina Hejje	K. Mani Murugan	Srinath, Shivaram, Ambareesh, Roja Ramani, K. S. Ashwath	Vijaya Bhaskar
Hombisilu	Geethapriya	Vishnuvardhan, Aarathi, Shivaram	Rajan Nagendra
Hoysala	C. V. Shivashankar	Hoysala, Vijayakala, Balakrishna, Dinesh	Lakshminarayana Goochi
Huli Banthu Huli	C. Chandrashekar	M. V. Vasudeva Rao, Ramakrishna, Raaji	Rajeev Taranath
Kiladi Jodi	Rajendra Singh Babu	Srinath, Vishnuvardhan, Lakshmi	Rajan–Nagendra
Kiladi Kittu	K. S. R. Das	Rajinikanth, Vishnuvardhan, Kavita	Mohan Kumar
Kudure Mukha	Y. R. Swamy	Ananth Nag, Aarathi, Ambareesh	T. G. Lingappa
Maathu Tappada Maga	Peketi Sivaram	Rajinikanth, Ananth Nag, Sharada, Aarathi, Dwarakish, K. S. Ashwath	Ilaiyaraaja
Madhura Sangama	T. P. Venugopal	Srinath, Bharathi Vishnuvardhan, Vishnuvardhan, Ananth Nag, Dwarakish	Rajan–Nagendra
Maleya Makkalu	K. Shivarama Karanth	Haladi Nagesh, Subramanya, Jayamma, Ashok Hegde, Kalpana	Padma-Charan
Muyyige Muyyi	Y. R. Swamy	Vishnuvardhan, Srinath, Manjula, Aarathi	Satyam
Mythri	M. R. K. Murthy	M. V. Vasudeva Rao, Baby Rekha, L. V. Sharada,	Satyam
Nanna Prayaschittha	Ugra Narasimha	Vishnuvardhan, Lokesh, Manjula	Sonic - Omi
Ondanondu Kaladalli	Girish Karnad	Shankar Nag, Akshata Rao, Sundar Krishna Urs	Bhaskar Chandavarkar
Ondu Oorina Kathe	Baraguru Ramachandrappa	M. V. Vasudeva Rao, Pramila, M. S. Umesh, Trishul	B. V. Karanth
Operation Diamond Racket	Dorai-Bhagavan	Rajkumar, Padmapriya, Raji, Chandralekha, Mamatha Shenoy, Vajramuni	G. K. Venkatesh
Paduvaaralli Pandavaru	Puttanna Kanagal	Ambareesh, Ramakrishna, Jai Jagadish, Srilalitha, Aarathi, Shubha	Vijaya Bhaskar
Parasangada Gendethimma	Maruti Shivram	Lokesh, Maanu, Reeta Anchan, Ramakrishna	Rajan–Nagendra
Phoenix	Ugranarasimha	Indrajith, Jayalakshmi, H P Saroja, Geetha	Rajan Nagendra
Prathima	Sudhir Menon	Vishnuvardhan, Bharathi, Ambareesh, Mamatha Shenoy	Khanu Ghosh
Premayana	Geethapriya	Ananth Nag, Aarathi, Vadiraj, Shivaram	Vijaya Bhaskar
Priya	S. P. Muthuraman	Rajinikanth, Sridevi, Ambareesh	Ilaiyaraaja
Sandharbha	Gauri Sundar	Bharathi, Ananth Nag, Gemini Ganesan	S. P. Balasubrahmanyam
Savalige Saval	Ramesh - Shivaram	Srikanth, Jayamala, Mamatha Shenoy, Jai Jagadish, Sundar Krishna Urs	T. G. Lingappa
Shankar Guru	V. Somashekar	Rajkumar, Jayamala, Kanchana, Padmapriya, Vajramuni, Thoogudeepa Srinivas	Upendra Kumar
Singapoorinalli Raja Kulla	C. V. Rajendran	Vishnuvardhan, Dwarakish, Manjula, Lokanath	Rajan–Nagendra
Siritanakke Savaal	T. R. Ramanna	Vishnuvardhan, Manjula Vijayakumar, K. S. Ashwath	Vijaya Bhaskar
Sneha Sedu	V. Madhusudhan Rao	Vishnuvardhan, Ambareesh, Manjula, Vajramuni	S. Rajeswara Rao
Spandana	Srinivas	Srinivas, Aparna Narang, Krishnaraj, Revathi	C. Ashwath
Sridevi	V. L. Acharya	Jayanthi, Shivaram, Hema Choudhary, K. S. Ashwath, Saikumar	M. Ranga Rao
Suli	B. S. Ranga	Lokesh, Ashok, Ramakrishna, Chandrakala, Susheela Naidu	Upendra Kumar
Sumangali	T. V. Singh Thakur	Ramesh, Ramgopal, Shivaram, Bhavani, Surekha	T. G. Lingappa
Thappida Thala	K. Balachander	Rajinikanth, Saritha, Kamal Hassan, Sundar Raj, Pramila Joshai	Vijaya Bhaskar
Thayige Thakka Maga	V. Somashekar	Rajkumar, Padmapriya, Sowcar Janaki, Savitri	T. G. Lingappa
Vamsha Jyothi	A. Bhimsingh	Vishnuvardhan, Kalpana, Rajesh, Lokesh, Bhavani	G. K. Venkatesh
Vasantha Lakshmi	A. V. Sheshagiri Rao	Srinath, Aarathi, Vishnuvardhan, Manjula, M. P. Shankar, Leelavathi, Pandari Bai, B. V. Radha, Jayamalini	Vijaya Bhaskar
Vathsalya Patha	A. S. R. Rao	Suresh Heblikar, L. V. Sharadha, Meenakshi, Devadas	B. V. Karanth, Guna Singh

== See also ==
- Kannada films of 1977
- Kannada films of 1979
