= Doddarangegowda =

Poet and lyricist in the Kannada language

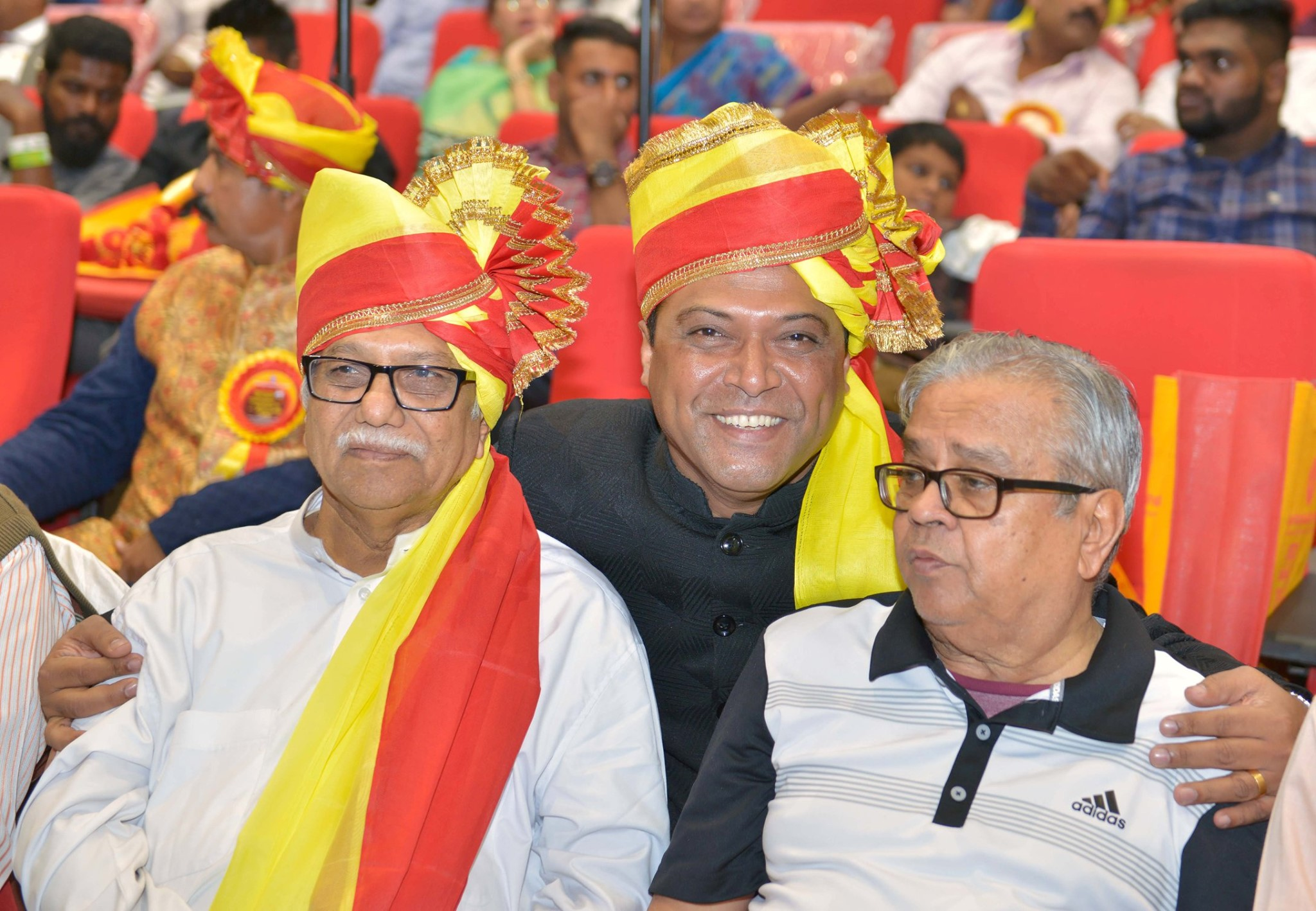
- Doddarangegowda (left) in 2019

Member of Karnataka Legislative Council
- In office 21 June 2008 – 20 June 2014

Personal details
- Born: 7 February 1946 (age 80) Kurubarahalli, Madhugiri, Tumkur, Kingdom of Mysore
- Spouse: K. Rajeshwari
- Children: 2
- Occupation: Poet, writer, professor, lyricist
- Awards: Padma Shri

Doddarangegowda (born 7 February 1946) is an Indian poet and lyricist working in Kannada cinema. He is a retired professor of Kannada and has published a number of anthologies in Kannada. He has released several audio cassettes and CDs of his poems. Some of his noteworthy songs are Tera Yeri Ambaradaage and Notadaage Nageya Meeti of Parasangada Gendethimma, Nammoora Mandara Hoove of Aalemane, Sri Rama Bandavne of Paduvaaralli Pandavaru. He was also a Bharatiya Janata Party MLC. In 2018, he was awarded with the civilian award Padma Shri.

== Biography ==
Doddarangegowda was born on 7 February 1946 to K. Rangegowda and Akkamma. He credited his father and Kannada-language teacher A. Ramachandra Rao as major inspiration for him to take interest in poetry. Doddarangegowda joined the Railway Mail Service in 1964. During his work in Hubli as a mail sorter, he met renowned Kannada poets and writers like D. R. Bendre, Patil Puttappa and G. B. Joshi. He recalled meeting P. V. Acharya, editor of the weekly Kasturi, as a "turning point" in his career. Acharya encouraged him to write for his weekly which he would do, while also writing poems for Chandrashekhar Patil's Sankramana, a literary magazine. After a short stint in Birur, Doddarangegowda was transferred to Bangalore. Here, he contributed to Khadri Shamanna's Gokula, and "picked up the nuances of journalism under him". This prompted Doddarangegowda to pursue a bachelor's degree in Kannada honors, and got himself enrolled in the Central College, Bangalore. His professors were renowned writers such as R. S. Mugali, G. S. Shivarudrappa, P. Lankesh, M. V. Seetharamiah. He would then acquire a master's degree there in 1972. Chandrashekhara Kambara was one of his professors. That year, he began working as a Kannada lecturer in SLN College, Bangalore. He worked till 1998 before serving as principal of the college from 2000 to 2004. Between 2004 and 2008, he worked at Seshadripuram College, Bangalore. In 2004, he secured a doctorate from Bangalore University, and submitted a thesis on reevaluation of Kannada romantic poetry of the Navodaya period.

Doddarangegowda's work in films began in 1977 with K. S. L. Swamy's Maagiya Kanasu. Swamy, one of the attendees of the 1977 seminar at the Bangalore University where Doddarangegowda presented a paper on Bendre's poems, introduced him to poet M. N. Vyasa Rao. Doddarangegowda then wrote the song "Bandide Badukina Bangarada" for the film; Vijaya Bhaskar scored the music for the song and was sung by Vani Jairam. He then wrote three songs for Puttanna Kanagal's Paduvaaralli Pandavaru (1978). Subsequently, he met directors K. V. Jayaram and A. V. Seshagiri Rao, with who he would become a frequent collaborator. Doddarangegowda's "Thera Eri Ambaradaage" for Parasangada Gendethimma (1978) received praise. He then wrote dialogue for Maralu Sarapani (1979) and Kappu Kola (1980). He received the Special Jury Award at the 1981–82 Karnataka State Film Award for his lyrics on the soundtrack of Aalemane (1981). He would receive the award again for 1990–91, for his work in Ganeshana Maduve (1990). For his work in Kavya (1995) and Janumada Jodi (1996) received the Karnataka State Film Award for Best Lyricist.

Doddarangegowda was noted for his collaborations with composers such as the duos, Rajan–Nagendra and Ashwath–Vaidi, and M. Ranga Rao. Speaking to Deccan Herald in an interview in 2021, about his style of writing, Doddarangegowda stated: "I use simple words and metaphors, and rural and folk images. People always welcome freshness, nativity and melody. A lyricist is a promoter of good taste and culture."

Doddarangegowda's wife Rajeshwari Gowda a professor and writer. They have a son and daughter.

== Bibliography ==
Doddarangegowda has written lyrics, odes, travelogues, and some other prose works.

=== Anthologies ===
- Maavu Bevu (Collection of songs)
- Kannu Naalage Kadalu

== Lyricist ==
Doddarangegowda has written lyrics for the soundtrack of the following Kannada films:

- Maagiya Kanasu (1977)
- Paduvaaralli Pandavaru (1978)
- Parasangada Gendethimma (1978)
- Siritanakke Savaal (1978)
- Bangarada Jinke (1980)
- Aalemane (1981)
- Prema Parva (1983)
- Olave Baduku (1984)
- Hosa Neeru (1985)
- Sangliyana (1988)
- Mithileya Seetheyaru (1988)
- Ganeshana Maduve (1990)
- Aruna Raaga (1986)
- Ashwamedha (1990)
- Kavya (1995)
- Megha Mandara (1992)
- Belli Kalungura (1992)
- Ranjitha (1993)
- Rashmi (1994)
- Janumada Jodi (1996)
- Nammoora Mandara Hoove (1996)
- Sparsha (2000)
- Lankesh Patrike (2003)
- Thandege Thakka Maga (2006)
- Taare (2011)
- Sri Kshetra Adi Chunchanagiri (2012)
- Allama (2017)
- Purushothamana Prasanga (2024)

== Awards and nominations ==
- 1972: Karnataka Sahitya Akademi Award for Poetry — Kannu Naalage Kadalu
- 1991: Karnataka State Film Award for Best Lyricist — Ganeshana Maduve
- 1996: Karnataka State Film Award for Best Lyricist — Kavya
- 1997: Karnataka State Film Award for Best Lyricist — Janumada Jodi
- 2003: Attimabbe award
- 2018: Padma Shri
