= Meri Adaalat =

- Poster
- Directed by: A. T. Raghu
- Written by: Kader Khan (dialogues)
- Screenplay by: H. V. Subba Rao
- Story by: H. V. Subba Rao
- Starring: Rajinikanth; Zeenat Aman
- Cinematography: P. Devaraj
- Edited by: K. Gopala Rao
- Music by: Bappi Lahiri
- Production company: Krishna Art Pictures
- Release date: 13 January 1984
- Country: India
- Language: Hindi

Meri Adaalat is a 1984 Hindi film directed by A. T. Raghu. The film was a revenge drama featuring Rajinikanth in the lead, supported by Zeenat Aman, Kader Khan, Shreeram Lagoo, Sonia Sahni, Mohnish Behl and Komal Mahuakar. The movie was dubbed in Tamil as Veetukku Oru Nallavan, It is a remake of director's own Kannada movie Aasha (1983) starring Ambareesh. This movie went on to inspire the 1991 Kannada movie Garuda Dhwaja also starring Ambareesh. The film was a box-office hit.

== Plot ==
It is the story of a brother played by Rajinikanth who is a tough cop and his sister played by Komal Mahuakar. The sister is in love with her college friend played by Mohnish Behl. It is the love story between them and the future incidents which make the cop take the law in his hands and have his own Adaalat called Meri Adaalat. Zeenat Aman a journalist plays the love interest of Rajinikanth supported by Kader Khan, Shreeram Lagoo and others.

== Cast ==
- Rajinikanth as Inspector Ashok
- Zeenat Aman as Prameela
- Kader Khan as Mohanraj
- Shreeram Lagoo as Judge Rajaram
- Sonia Sahni as Mrs. Mohanraj
- Mohnish Behl as Arjun
- Komal Mahuvakar as Asha

== Music ==
Music by Bappi Lahiri.

Song	Singer
"You are Beautiful"	Kishore Kumar, Asha Bhosle
"Osa Osa"	Asha Bhosle, Bappi Lahiri
"Rajaji, Raniji"	Asha Bhosle, Shabbir Kumar
"Ek Baar Bach Gayi"	Asha Bhosle, Shabbir Kumar
"Gudiya Jaisi Behna"	Usha Mangeshkar, K. J. Yesudas
