= Hrudaya Sangama =

- VCD cover
- Directed by: Rashi Brothers
- Screenplay by: G. Balasubramanyam; Rashi Brothers
- Story by: Muddukrishna H N
- Produced by: Muddukrishna H N Jayasimha H N Maruthi H N
- Starring: Rajkumar; Bharathi; K. S. Ashwath
- Cinematography: D. V. Jayaram
- Edited by: V. P. Krishnan
- Music by: Vijaya Bhaskar
- Production company: MJM Productions
- Release date: 1972
- Running time: 165 minutes
- Country: India
- Language: Kannada

Hrudaya Sangama is a 1972 Indian Kannada language drama film directed by Rashi Brothers (Shivaram and S. Ramanathan) and produced by MJM Productions. It starred Rajkumar and Bharathi. The film was part black-and-white and part color, thus making it a partial color film. Vijaya Bhaskar scored the music and the story was written by H. N. Muddukrishna.The movie saw a theatrical run of 18 weeks.

The film, upon release, was critically acclaimed and went on to win the Karnataka State Award for fourth best film for the year 1972–73.

The 2024 movie Krishnam Pranaya Sakhi borrows plot elements from this movie.

Rajkumar played dual role in a small portion of the movie where the second character appears only for three minutes on-screen in an important plot twist.

== Plot ==
Rajanna is a rich zamindar who takes a train journey and meets with an accident and loses memory. He falls in love with a village girl and marries her. What happens when he regains his memory and goes back to his home?

== Cast ==
- Dr. Rajkumar as Jamindaar Rajanna and Kumar (dual role)
- Bharathi Vishnuvardhan as Belli
- K. S. Ashwath
- T. N. Balakrishna as Dasappa
- Jayaram
- Jayakumari
- Rama
- Ganapathi Bhat as Nanja
- Comedian Guggu as Sidda
- Mahadevappa
- Loknath
- H. G. Somashekar Rao
- Dr Sridhar
- Tiptur Siddharamayya
- Sampath
- Vasanthi
- Narayana
- Ramachandra
- Manjula
- Girija
- Rajeshwari
- Pandari Bai (cameo)
- Shakti Prasad (cameo)
- Shivaram (cameo)

== Soundtrack ==
The music of the film was composed by Vijaya Bhaskar. The song "Nee Thanda Kanike" was received extremely well and considered as one of the evergreen duet songs.

Title	Singer(s)	Lyrics
"Nee Thanda Kanike"	P. B. Sreenivas, S. Janaki	R. N. Jayagopal
"Nade Nade Nade Manave"	P. B. Sreenivas	Geethapriya
"Gandhada Nerigyole"	Mahesh, Anjali	Geethapriya
"Yaaru Nee Yaaru"	L. R. Eswari	Chi. Udaya Shankar
"Yeno Kurudu Bhavane"	S. Janaki	Vijaya Narasimha
"Nee Thanda Kanike"	S. Janaki	R. N. Jayagopal

== Legacy ==
The core concept of hero concealing his identity of rich family and acting as a poor guy in order to marry a simpleton girl and subsequently losing his memory in a mishap and forgetting about his marriage and his wife staying in the same house and acting as a maid servant went on to be seen in Krishnam Pranaya Sakhi (2024).
