= Swayamvaram =

Swayamvaram, Swayamvara or Swayamvar may refer to:

- Svayamvara, a marriage ritual in ancient India, where the bride chose her own husband
  - Sita Svayamvara, a popular episode in the ancient Indian epic Ramayana, concerning the marriage of Sita and Rama
- Swayamvaram (1972 film), an Indian Malayalam-language film by Adoor Gopalakrishnan
- Swayamvaram (1982 film), an Indian Telugu-language film by Dasari Narayana Rao
- Swayamvaram (1999 film), an Indian Telugu-language film by K. Vijaya Bhaskar
- Swayamvara Panthal, a 2000 Indian Malayalam-language film by Hari Kumar
- Swayamvara (2010 film), a 2010 Indian film
- Swayamvaram (play), part of the Krishnanattam dance drama of Kerala, India
- Swayamvar (TV series), Indian reality show
  - Swayamvar – Mika Di Vohti, season of the Indian reality show
- Swayamvaram (TV series), an Indian Malayalam-language soap opera.
