= Devaru Kotta Thangi =

Devaru Kotta Thangi may refer to:

- Devaru Kotta Thangi (1973 film), a Kannada-language film directed by K. S. L. Swamy
- Devaru Kotta Thangi (2009 film), a Kannada-language film directed by Om Saiprakash
