= Kaattu Rani =

Kaattu Rani (transl. Jungle Queen) may refer to these Indian films:

- Kaattu Rani (1965 film), a Tamil-language film
- Kaattu Rani (1985 film), a Malayalam-language film

== See also ==
- Jungle Queen (disambiguation)
