= Mithileya Seetheyaru =

- Directed by: K. S. L. Swamy (Lalitha Ravi)
- Written by: Anuradha Ramanan
- Screenplay by: B. Suresha
- Produced by: B. V. Radha
- Starring: Geetha; Akhila Thandur; Kalpana Iyer; B. V. Radha
- Cinematography: R. Manjunath
- Edited by: Suresh Urs
- Music by: Vijaya Bhaskar
- Production company: Radha Ravi Chithra
- Release date: 29 August 1988
- Country: India
- Language: Kannada

Mithileya Seetheyaru is a 1988 Indian Kannada-language film, directed by K. S. L. Swamy (Lalitha Ravi) and produced by B. V. Radha. The film stars Geetha, Akhila Thandur, Kalpana Iyer and B. V. Radha. The film has musical score by Vijaya Bhaskar. The film marked the acting debut of Prakash Raj.

== Cast ==
- Geetha as Vanitha
- Akhila Thandur
- Kalpana Iyer
- B. V. Radha as Pathu
- H. G. Somashekar Rao as Visveshwaraiah
- Vadiraj
- L. S. Sudhindra
- G. K. Govinda Rao
- B. A. L. Prasanna
- Srishailan
- Gode Lakshminarayana
- Srinivas Meshtru
- Sridhar
- Gopalakrishna
- Jayaram
- Nagabharana
- Prakash Raj as doctor
- Sringeri Ramanna
- Gangadhar
- Basavaraj
- Rajanikumar
- Venugopal
- Jorge
- Nagesh
- Pandith
- Gayathri Prabhakar
- Sathyabhama
- Kiran
- Bhagavathi
- Srishailan
- Baby Adithi
- S. P. Balasubrahmanyam as himself in a cameo
- Vishnuvardhan as S. K. Kumar in a cameo
- Kashinath as himself in a cameo
- Shankar Nag as Inspector Sharif in a cameo

== Soundtrack ==
The music was composed by Vijaya Bhaskar.

| No. | Song | Singers | Lyrics | Length (m:ss) |
|---|---|---|---|---|
| 1 | "Jeevana Ullasa Payana" | S. P. Balasubrahmanyam | Su. Rudramurthy Shastry | 04:21 |
| 2 | "Sanje Namma Bhavanu" | B. R. Chaya, Kusuma | Chi. Udaya Shankar | 04:03 |
| 3 | "Ramanu Baralilla Yeke" | Kasturi Shankar | Chi. Udaya Shankar | 05:53 |
| 4 | "Aaramba Yaarinda Yaarinda" | B. R. Chaya, Narasimha Nayak | Doddarangegowda | 04:32 |
| 5 | "Adiyidalu Neenu" | S. P. Balasubrahmanyam | Lalitha Ravee | 05:30 |
