= Arishina Kumkuma =

1970 film

- Directed by: K. S. L. Swamy (Ravee)
- Written by: K. Subramanyam Iyer
- Screenplay by: Valampuri Somanathan
- Produced by: H. V. Nagendrappa; M. V. Dodda Veeranna; K. V. Nagabhushana Shetty; K. G. Veeranna; Mallikarjunappa; Thippeswamy
- Starring: Kalpana; Kalyan Kumar; Rajesh; K. S. Ashwath
- Cinematography: R. N. K. Prasad
- Edited by: Bal G. Yadav; N. M. Victor
- Music by: Vijaya Bhaskar
- Production company: Sri Gurubhakthi Films
- Distributed by: Sri Gurubhakthi Films
- Release date: 24 January 1970
- Country: India
- Language: Kannada

Arishina Kumkuma is a 1970 Indian Kannada film, directed by K. S. L. Swamy (Ravee) and produced by H. V. Nagendrappa, M. V. Dodda Veeranna, K. V. Nagabhushana Shetty, K. G. Veeranna, Mallikarjunappa and Thippeswamy. The film stars Kalpana, Kalyan Kumar, Rajesh and K. S. Ashwath in the lead roles. The film has musical score by Vijaya Bhaskar. The film was remade in Tamil as Deivamsam (1972) with A. V. M. Rajan and Sasikumar.

== Cast ==
- Kalpana as Radha Devi
- Kalyan Kumar as Raja "Raju" N. K.
- Rajesh as Shankar
- K. S. Ashwath as Nanjundaiah, Radha's father
- Dwarakish as Gundu Rao
- H. R. Shastry
- Thoogudeepa Srinivas as Balu
- Shailesh Kumar
- M. Jayashree as Nanjundaiah's sister
- Papamma as Kamala
- R. T. Rama as Saroja
- B. Jaya
- P. B. Sreenivas as himself (cameo)
- Srinath in a cameo
- B. V. Radha in a cameo
- Shylashri in a cameo
- Kodanda Rao
- G. M. Nanjappa

== Soundtrack ==
The music was composed by Vijaya Bhaskar.

No.	Song	Singers	Lyrics	Length (m:ss)
1	"Arashina Kumkuma"	S. Janaki	Chi. Udaya Shankar	03:46
2	"Goodinali Ondubanadi"	R. Panigrahi	R. N. Jayagopal	04:03
3	"Honnase Ullavage"	P. B. Sreenivas	R. N. Jayagopal	03:07
4	"Mannalli Kaleya"	S. Janaki	Vijaya Narasimha	02:52
5	"Thaware Hookere"	P. B. Sreenivas, P. Susheela	Vijaya Narasimha	03:49
6	"Om Om Om Ilidu Baa Thaye"	P. B. Sreenivas	D. R. Bendre	06:05
