= Bayasade Banda Bhagya =

- Directed by: R. Ramamurthy
- Written by: Lyrics & Dialogs: Chi Udaya Shankar
- Story by: Bala Murugan
- Produced by: R. Ramaseshan; R. Kasi Vishwanathan
- Starring: Vishnuvardhan; Manjula; Ram Gopal; Sri Lalitha; T. N. Balakrishna
- Cinematography: Chittibabu; Ganesh Pandyan
- Edited by: R. Ramamurthy
- Music by: Rajan–Nagendra
- Production company: Sri Rama Enterprise
- Distributed by: Sri Chandi Films
- Release date: 1977
- Running time: 118 Min.
- Country: India
- Language: Kannada

Bayasade Banda Bhagya is a 1977 Kannada film written by Bala Murugan and directed by R. Ramamurthy. The film stars Vishnuvardhan and Balakrishna, with actors Manjula, Ram Gopal, and Sri Lalitha.

== Cast ==
- Vishnuvardhan as Raamu
- Manjula as Shantha
- Ram Gopal as Lakshmana
- Sri Lalitha as Geetha
- T. N. Balakrishna as Gudibande Gunduraya, Lakshmana's father
- Indira Devi as Rathna, Lakshmana's mother
- Shivaram as Shiva
- Joker Shyam as Ganesha
- Paapamma as Shantha's mother
- Dinesh as Jagannath Rao, Geetha's father

== Soundtrack ==
"Muttina Hanigalu" - Chi. Udayashankar - Rajan Nagendra - S. Janaki S. P. Balasubrahmanyam

"Preethisu Sameepisu" - Chi. Udayashankar - S. Janaki P. B. Sreenivas
