= Thoogudeepa =

- Directed by: K. S. L. Swamy
- Produced by: R. G. Keshava Murthy
- Starring: Rajkumar; Leelavathi; Narasimharaju; Udaykumar
- Cinematography: R. N. Krishna Prasad
- Music by: Vijaya Bhaskar
- Release date: 1966
- Country: India
- Language: Kannada

Thoogudeepa is a 1966 Indian Kannada-language film, directed by K. S. L. Swamy in his directorial debut, and produced by R. G. Keshava Murthy. The film stars Rajkumar, Leelavathi, Narasimharaju and Udaykumar. The film has musical score by Vijaya Bhaskar. It is based on the Bengali novel Chandranath by Sarat Chandra Chatterjee.

P. B. Sreenivas made his first on-screen appearance through a song in this movie. The song Mounave Aabharana became the first song to be shot in Brindavan Gardens in Mysore.

== Cast ==
- Rajkumar
- Leelavathi
- Narasimharaju
- Udaykumar
- B. V. Radha
- T. N. Balakrishna
- Srinivas
- P. B. Sreenivas

== Soundtrack ==
The music was composed by Vijaya Bhaskar.

| No. | Song | Singers | Lyrics | Length (m:ss) |
|---|---|---|---|---|
| 1 | "Ellinda Nee Bande" | L. R. Eswari | K. S. L. Swamy | 03:30 |
| 2 | "Helale Haadale" | P.Susheela | R. N. Jayagopal | 03:18 |
| 3 | "Manave Mandira" 1 | P. B. Sreenivas, Raj Kumar | Nanjarajurs | 03:12 |
| 4 | "Manave Mandira" 2 | P. B. Sreenivas | Nanjarajurs | 03:11 |
| 5 | "My Fair Lady" | P. B. Sreenivas, L. R. Eswari | R. N. Jayagopal | 02:21 |
| 6 | "Needibanni Praanadaana" | P. B. Sreenivas | Nanjarajurs | 02:30 |
| 7 | "Nimma Muddina Kandha" | P. B. Sreenivas | Nanjarajurs | 03:20 |
| 8 | "Thoogu Deepavidoo" | P. B. Sreenivas | K. S. L. Swamy | 03:26 |

== Legacy ==
Srinivas who acted in the film later adapted the film's name as prefix.
