= Lagna Pathrike =

- Poster
- Directed by: K. S. L. Swamy
- Written by: Chi Udayashankar
- Screenplay by: Chi Udayashankar
- Produced by: A. M. Sameevulla
- Starring: Rajkumar; Jayanthi
- Cinematography: K. Janakiram
- Edited by: Bal G. Yadav
- Music by: Vijaya Bhaskar
- Production company: Bawa Movietone
- Distributed by: Bawa Movietone
- Release date: 24 June 1967
- Country: India
- Language: Kannada

Lagna Pathrike ( transl. Wedding Invitation) is a 1967 Indian Kannada-language film, directed by K. S. L. Swamy and produced by A. M. Sameevulla. The film stars Rajkumar and Jayanthi. The film has musical score by Vijaya Bhaskar. This is the only movie in entire career of Rajkumar whose title starts with the letter "L".

== Cast ==
- Dr. Rajkumar as Raghu
- Jayanthi as Seetha
- Narasimharaju as Govinda, Raghu's friend
- Dwarakish as Ganesha, Raghu's friend
- Chi. Udaya Shankar
- Shivaram
- B. V. Radha
- M. Jayashree as Savitri
- Thoogudeepa Srinivas
- Jr. Revathi
- Srinath as stage actor (debut)
- Gangadhar as stage actor (debut)

== Soundtrack ==
The music was composed by Vijaya Bhaskar with lyrics written by Chi. Udayashankar.

No.	Song	Singers	Length (m:ss)
1	"Brahmachari Sharanade"	P. B. Sreenivas, A. L. Ragavan	04:01
2	"Balu Aparoopa Nam Jodi"	P. B. Sreenivas, A. L. Ragavan	3:46
3	"Gandu Muththina Chendu"	P. B. Sreenivas, L. R. Eswari	06:19
4	"Illi Yaru Illa"	P. B. Sreenivas, L. R. Eswari, Bangalore Latha	03:39
5	"Aashagana Mohana"	S. Janaki	03:14
6	"Jan Jan Kalgejje"	S. Janaki	03:41
7	"Kanneradoo"	P. B. Sreenivas	03:58
8	"Nagareekane Ninna"	S. Janaki	05:05
9	"Nijavo Sullo"	S. Janaki, P. B. Sreenivas	04:05
10	"Premagana Thanda"	S. Janaki	02:54
11	Title Song	Instrumental	02:10
