= Taare =

2011 Indian Kannada-language romantic drama film

- Directed by: S Shivaraj Hosakere
- Written by: N K Keerthiraj (dialogue)
- Screenplay by: S Shivaraj Hosakere
- Story by: K K Raveesh; S Shivaraj Hosakere
- Produced by: B R Vinay; K K Raveesh
- Starring: Diganth; Urvashi Solanki; Sanjana
- Cinematography: S Ramesh
- Edited by: Damodar Kanasur
- Music by: C R Bobby
- Production company: Yashaswini Pictures
- Release date: 21 October 2011
- Country: India
- Language: Kannada

Taare is a 2011 Indian Kannada-language romantic drama film directed by S Shivaraj Hosakere and starring Diganth, Urvashi Solanki and Sanjana.

== Cast ==
- Diganth as Nesara
- Urvashi Solanki as the city girl
- Sanjana as Gowra
- Karibasavaiah
- Tennis Krishna
- R. G. Vijayasarathy as Chandru
- Rekha Das
- Michael Madhu as a lecturer
- Doddarangegowda as a teacher

== Production ==
The film began production in 2007 when Diganth had no offers after the shoot of Gaalipata. Urvashi Solanki, a Gujarati, debuted in Kannada through this film. Doddarangegowda acted and wrote a song for the film. The film was shot in mid-2010 in Bangalore, Chikkamagaluru, Davangere, Kemmanugundi and Madhugiri. Although shooting was completed, the film remained unreleased. The director Shivaraj Hoskere and producer Ravish clashed when the director wasn't paid and his name was omitted from posters.

== Soundtrack ==
The music was composed by C R Bobby, who previously worked for Black (2009). The audio was released under the Aditya Music banner. Urvashi Solanki was not present at the audio launch. The lyrics were written by Doddarangegowda, V. Nagendra Prasad, Jayant Kaikini and Shivaraj Hosekere.

Track listing
No.	Title	Singer(s)	Length
1.	"Manasaare"	P. Unnikrishnan, K. S. Chitra	4:15
2.	"Kanasu Kandagide"	Karthik, Chinmayi Sripada	4:44
3.	"Jakkanakkare"	Hemanth	3:19
4.	"Chaitrada Masavu"	Kavitha Krishnamurthy, C. R. Bobby	5:30
5.	"Ragarangina Sangeetha"	Shankar Mahadevan, M. D. Pallavi	4:31
6.	"Chandira Tandhu Kodale"	Lakshmi Nagaraj	0:58
Total length:			23:17

== Release and reception ==
The film was released on 21 October 2011 coinciding with Naanalla (2011) and Ishta (2011).

A critic from Bangalore Mirror wrote that "Shivaraj is a sensible director, but his narration gets patchy at times. But the rest of the film can be easily missed". After the release of Kaanchaana (2011) the following week, this film was removed from theatres.
