= Bhagyada Bagilu =

- Directed by: K. S. L. Swamy (Ravi)
- Written by: Dore
- Screenplay by: Ravi
- Produced by: B. H. Jayanna
- Starring: Rajkumar; Balakrishna; Dwarakish; K. S. Ashwath in Guest Appearance
- Cinematography: K. Janakiram
- Edited by: Bal G. Yadav
- Music by: Vijaya Bhaskar
- Production company: SJK Productions
- Distributed by: SJK Productions
- Release date: 16 May 1968
- Country: India
- Language: Kannada

Bhagyada Bagilu is a 1968 Indian Kannada-language film, directed by K. S. L. Swamy (Ravi) and produced by B. H. Jayanna. The film stars Rajkumar, Balakrishna, Dwarakish, with K. S. Ashwath in a guest appearance. The film has musical score by Vijaya Bhaskar. This was Rajkumar's 100th film as an actor.

The film as declared average in the box office

== Cast ==
- Dr. Rajkumar as Raju
- Balakrishna as Gunda
- Dwarakish as Hanumanta
- K. S. Ashwath as Shyam Rao in a cameo
- Prasad in a cameo
- B. Vijayalakshmi as Vijayalakshmi
- B. V. Radha as Kokila
- B. Jaya as Basvi
- M. Jayashree as Kamala
- Papamma as Tungabhadra
- Thoogudeepa_Srinivas
- Srirangamurthy
- Shastry
- Venkatesh
- Narayan
- Raju
- Venkataramaiah

== Soundtrack ==
The music was composed by Vijaya Bhaskar.

No.	Song	Singers	Lyrics	Length (m:ss)
1	"Naane Rajakumara"	P. B. Sreenivas	Chi. Udaya Shankar	03:07
2	"Hagalenu Irulenu?"	P B Srinivas S P Balasubrahamanyam	Chi. Udaya Shankar	-
