= Lalitha (film) =

- Title card
- Directed by: Valampuri Somanathan
- Screenplay by: Valampuri Somanathan
- Story by: Ashutosh Mukherjee
- Produced by: S. P. Rao; Valampuri Somanathan
- Starring: Gemini Ganesan; Sujatha; Kamal Haasan; Sumithra
- Cinematography: N. Balakrishnan
- Edited by: M. Babu
- Music by: M. S. Viswanathan
- Production company: Girnar Films
- Release date: 10 December 1976
- Country: India
- Language: Tamil

Lalitha is a 1976 Indian Tamil-language drama film, written and directed by Valampuri Somanathan. Starring Sujatha in the title role, the film has Gemini Ganesan, Kamal Haasan and Sumithra playing other pivotal roles. It is a remake of the Bengali film Saat Pake Bandha (1963). The film was released on 10 December 1976.

== Plot ==
A rich woman named Lalitha loves and marries professor Shankar. Since he is at a very low status compared to her family, Lalitha's mother continuously humiliates them on various occasions. Lalitha, one day, separates from her husband, following an argument about her mother's deeds. Days after, when she decides to reunite with her husband, he has moved far away from there. The rest of the story deals with how they reunite after a long period.

== Cast ==
- Gemini Ganesan as Shankar
- Sujatha as Lalitha
- Kamal Haasan as Balu
- Sumithra as Vaani
- Pandari Bai as Shankar's Aunt
- N. Viswanathan as Lalitha's father
- Sukumari as Meenakshi, Lalitha's mother
- Thangavelu as Vaani's father
- Thengai Srinivasan

== Production ==
Lalitha was directed by Valampuri Somanathan, and produced under production banner Girnar Films. The final length of the film was 4,376.32 metres (14,358.0 ft). The film saw Gemini Ganesan and Sujatha paired for the first time.

== Soundtrack ==
All the lyrics were penned by Kannadasan and music was scored by M. S. Viswanathan.

Track title	Singers
"Sorgathile Mudivaanadhu"	S. P. Balasubrahmanyam, Vani Jairam
"Mannil Nalla"	K. Veeramani, Lalgudi Swaminathan, V. Sreepathy
"Kalyaaname Pennoduthan"	Vani Jairam
"Ennamma"	L. R. Eswari, T. M. Soundararajan
"Vasanthangal Varum Munbe"	P. Susheela, M. S. Viswanathan

== Reception ==
Kanthan of Kalki called Lalitha an old-age family story with many heartwarming scenes and concluded the film has neither innovation nor revolution.

== Bibliography ==
- Rajadhyaksha, Ashish; Willemen, Paul (1998) [1994]. Encyclopaedia of Indian Cinema. British Film Institute and Oxford University Press. ISBN 0-19-563579-5.
