= Valampuri Somanathan =

Tamil scholar and poet

- Born: c. 1928; Valampuri, Pudukkottai State
- Died: 21 June 2010 (aged 81–82); Chennai, Tamil Nadu, India
- Occupations: Poet, screenwriter, producer, director

Valampuri Somanathan (c. 1928 – 21 June 2010) was a Tamil scholar and poet. He worked as a screenwriter in the Tamil film industry. In addition to screenwriting, he produced and directed a few films in Tamil. He was elected as president of Film Producers Guild of South India in 1987.

== Partial filmography ==
As writer

- Mangaiyar Thilakam (1955)
- Pathi Bakthi (1958)
- Bandha Pasam (1962)
- Vanambadi (1963)
- Paar Magaley Paar (1963)
- Karuppu Panam (1964)
- Panchavarna Kili (1965)
- Arishina Kumkuma (1970) (Kannada)
- Lakshmi Saraswathi (1970) (Kannada)
- Aaru Mooru Ombhatthu (1970) (Kannada)
- Bhale Adrusthavo Adrushta (1971) (Kannada)
- Thambathyam (1987)

As producer

- Oru Nadigai Natakam Parkiral (1978)
- Thunaivi
- Thirumanam

As director

- Sigappukkal Mookkuthi (1979)
- Thunai Iruppal Meenakshi (1977)
- Lalitha (1976)
- Thunaivi (1982)

== Bibliography ==
- Tamizh Pada Ulagin Thanthai director K. Subrahmanyam (2004), a book based on the life of Tamil film director K. Subrahmanyam
