= Enkeyo Ketta Kural =

1982 film by S. P. Muthuraman

- Theatrical release poster
- Directed by: S. P. Muthuraman
- Written by: Panchu Arunachalam
- Produced by: Meena Panju Arunachalam
- Starring: Rajinikanth; Ambika; Radha
- Cinematography: Babu
- Edited by: R. Vittal
- Music by: Ilaiyaraaja
- Production company: P. A. Art Productions
- Release date: 14 August 1982
- Country: India
- Language: Tamil

Enkeyo Ketta Kural (transl. A Voice Heard Somewhere) is a 1982 Indian Tamil-language drama film, written by Panchu Arunachalam and directed by S. P. Muthuraman. The film stars Rajinikanth in the lead role, with Ambika and Radha playing his love interests and Meena as their daughter. It was released on 14 August 1982, and won the Filmfare Award for Best Film – Tamil and two Tamil Nadu State Film Awards. The film was later remade in Telugu as Bava Maradallu in 1984, in Hindi as Suhaagan in 1986 and in Kannada as Midida Hrudayagalu in 1993.

== Plot ==
Kumaran, a hardworking but easily aggrieved and very righteous man, is in love with his first cousin Ponni. Ponni works a very leisurely and laid-back job in a grand mansion. Ponni's younger sibling Kamatchi is fond of Kumaran, but he does not take her seriously. Vishwanathan, the father of Ponni and Kamatchi, plans to get Kumaran and Ponni married. Ponni reluctantly marries Kumaran. A daughter, Meena, is born after a year. Ponni starts to detest Kumaran because of her newfound tasks. Later, her previous employer dies of old age. Ponni visits her employer's son (who is also unhappily married) after the funeral. They both converse about their supposedly miserable lives and decide to elope. After Ponni runs away, her family disowns her and decides to have Kamatchi marry Kumaran. The initially reluctant Kumaran is convinced by his father-in-law and marries Kamatchi. The pair bonds over time and lives in contentment with the child. Ponni realizes her blunder after a few weeks. Disgusted with herself, she leaves the eloped partner, remaining faithful to Kumaran by not engaging in any debauchery with her partner. He confers her a small house near the village, where she spends the rest of her life. She meets her daughter, but her sister, disgusted with Ponni, orders the child not to meet her ever again. Kumaran comes to learn about her faithfulness and visits Ponni on her deathbed. She dies by Kumaran's side after reminiscing about her life. Kumaran is warned by his father-in-law that he will be banished from the village if takes part in her funeral. Kumaran defies him and performs the last rites for Ponni along with their daughter and Kamatchi.

== Cast ==
- Rajinikanth as Kumaran
- Ambika as Ponni
- Radha as Kamatchi
- Meena as child Meena (daughter of Kumaran and Ponni)
- Delhi Ganesh as Vishwanathan
- Kamala Kamesh as Vishwanathan's wife
- V. S. Raghavan
- T. K. S. Natarajan
- K. Kannan
- Vairam Krishnamoorthy

== Production ==
After writing Murattu Kaalai (1980) and Pokkiri Raja (1982) which were heavy on action, Panchu Arunachalam wanted to do a softer film with the same lead actor, Rajinikanth, which became Engeyo Ketta Kural. Rajinikanth accepted to star because he liked the story. The film was completely shot at a village near Chengalpet.

== Soundtrack ==
The music was composed by Ilaiyaraaja.

Track listing
No.	Title	Lyrics	Singer(s)	Length
1.	"Aathoram Kaathaada"	Panchu Arunachalam	Jency	04:27
2.	"Nee Paadum Paadal"	Panchu Arunachalam	S. Janaki	04:13
3.	"Pattu Vanna Selaikaari"	Panchu Arunachalam	Malaysia Vasudevan	04:18
4.	"Thaayum Naane"	Vaali	S. Janaki	04:25
Total length:				17:23

== Release and reception ==
Enkeyo Ketta Kural was released on 14 August 1982. Due to competition from another Muthuraman-directed film Sakalakala Vallavan, released on the same day, it was less successful. Thiraignani of Kalki felt the reason for Ambika eloping and returning back reformed lacked strong reasons and added the ending of the story, which is not easy to accept, raises many problematic questions that make our heads turn gray but praised the performances of Ambika, Delhi Ganesh and Kamala Kamesh. He also praised Arunachalam's dialogues and Babu's cinematography and concluded if Kamal Haasan is "Sakalakala Vallavan", then Rajinikanth is "Sakalakala Nallavan".

== Accolades ==
Enkeyo Ketta Kural won the Filmfare Award for Best Film – Tamil. It also won two Tamil Nadu State Film Awards: Best Film and Best Dialogue Writer (Arunachalam). Rajinikanth won the Film Fans Association Award for Best Actor.

== Bibliography ==
- Ramachandran, Naman (2014) [2012]. Rajinikanth: The Definitive Biography. New Delhi: Penguin Books. ISBN 978-0-14-342111-5.
- Muthuraman, S. P. (2017) [2005]. AVM Thandha SPM (in Tamil) (3rd ed.). Vikatan. OCLC 607342391.
