= H. G. Somashekar Rao =

Indian actor and theatre artist (died 2020)

- Born: 1933 or 1934; Chitradurga, Kingdom of Mysore
- Died: 3 November 2020 (aged 86); Bangalore, Karnataka
- Occupations: Actor and theatre artist
- Notable work: Mithileya Seetheyaru, Harakeya Kuri
- Relatives: H. G. Dattatreya (brother)

Harihar Gundurao Somashekar Rao (1933 or 1934 – 3 November 2020) was an Indian Kannada-language theatre artist and actor. He acted in over 300 plays and 60 films over a career that spanned 50 years. He was a recipient of the Karnataka State Government's award for his role in Mithileya Seetheyaru (1988).

== Early life ==
Rao was born in Chitradurga, in the erstwhile Kingdom of Mysore of British India (now in Karnataka) to lawyer and freedom fighter Harihar Gundu Rao and Venkamma. He had completed his degree in sociology from the University of Mysore and was a gold medalist. He went on to become an assistant general manager at Canara Bank while continuing to pursue his acting career. During this period he also set up the staff training college at the bank.

== Career ==
Rao started his acting career by acting in theatre productions during his posting with Canara Bank in Mysore in the 1960s and 1970s. Subsequently, he continued acting when he relocated to Bangalore in the early 1970s.

He made his acting debut in feature films in the 1975 Kannada film, Geejagana Goodu. Over the course of his career spanning 50 years, he acted in notable films including Mithileya Seeteyaru, Minchina Oota, Accident and Harakeya Kuri. Plays he acted in included 777 Charlie, Nane Bijjala, Jokumaraswamy, Ashadhabooti and Kadadida Neeru. His role as a retired school teacher in the 2015 film Last Page was acclaimed for the sensitivity that he brought to the role, and the film itself went on to win the best film award at the 2015 Kolkata International Film Festival. In his career he worked with noted directors including T. N. Seetharam, Nagathihalli Chandrashekhar, K. S. L. Swamy, T. N. Narasimhan, and Kiran Raj. His co-actors included Rajkumar, Anant Nag, Vishnuvardhan, Geetha, Ramesh Aravind and Prakash Raj.

He was the principal of the Bangalore-based acting institute Abinaya Taranga between 2001 and 2003, and later went on to be its chairman. He was also a writer of over 25 books, including two novels, and an autobiography that remained unfinished at the time of his death.

== Personal life ==
Rao was married and had two sons. His brother is the noted Kannada actor Dattanna. Rao died on 3 November 2020 of a cardiac arrest in Bangalore at the age of 86.

== Filmography ==
Films of Rao as an actor include:

- Geejagana Goodu (1975)
- Savithri (1979)
- Kaamana Billu (1983)
- Accident (1984)
- Vajra Mushti (1985)
- 27 Mavalli Circle (1986)
- Ravana Rajya (1987)
- Mithileya Seetheyaru (1988)
- Sura Sundaranga (1989)
- Mane (1989)
- Abhimana (1989)
- Ajagajantara (1991)
- Prajegalu Prabhugalu (1992)
- Harakeya Kuri (1992)
- Minugu Thare (1996)
- Hoomale (1998)
- Pravaha (2004)
- Kurmavathara (2013)
- Last Page (2015)
- 777 Charlie (2022)
