= Savaale Samali =

- Theatrical release poster
- Directed by: Malliyam Rajagopal
- Written by: Malliyam Rajagopal
- Produced by: Das & Das
- Starring: Sivaji Ganesan; Jayalalithaa; C. R. Vijayakumari; R. Muthuraman
- Cinematography: A. Vincent
- Edited by: R. Devarajan
- Music by: M. S. Viswanathan
- Production company: Malliyam Productions
- Release date: 3 July 1971
- Running time: 159 minutes
- Country: India
- Language: Tamil

Savaale Samali (transl. Meet the challenge) is a 1971 Indian Tamil-language film, starring Sivaji Ganesan in is his 150th film. Written and directed by Malliyam Rajagopal, it was released on 3 July 1971. The film was remade in Telugu as Manchi Rojulu Vachayi (1972), in Malayalam as Randu Lokam (1977), in Kannada as Siritanakke Savaal (1978) and in Hindi as Charnon Ki Saugandh (1988). The film become a blockbuster at the box-office, running for over 100 days in theatres.

== Plot ==
The film is about class struggle between the landlords who owned most of the land in India and their tenant farmers who were taken advantage off and ill treated by the landlords wrapped into a love story. Jayalalitha comes from a rich land lord family and visits her village from college where her parents reside. She is picked up from the station by Sivaji a local tenant farmer. Jayalalitha’s bags fall from the horse cart and she blames and insults Sivaji. Sivaji leaves her and drives away. In the local election, Jayalalitha’s father agrees to get his daughter married to Sivaji if he loses the election and Sivaji should give up his lands if he loses. Sivaji wins and Jayalalitha is forced into an unhappy marriage with a poor tenant farmer. Jayalalitha is bitterly unhappy, and returns to her mother’s house where her mother lectures her on the virtues of Indian marriage and after a few twists and turns, the couple is reunited. Although it is about class struggle, the portrayal that women do not have the agency to decide their fate is very sad to behold. That is still the fate of women in India and many other parts of the world, although things have become much better after 50 years since this movie was shot.

== Cast ==
- Sivaji Ganesan as Manickam
- Jayalalithaa as Sakunthala
- C. R. Vijayakumari as Kaveri
- R. Muthuraman as Kalimuthu
- M. N. Nambiar as Rajavel
- V. S. Raghavan as Ayyakannu
- T. K. Bhagavathi as Thirunavukarasu (Periya Pannai)
- S. Varalakshmi as Alamel
- Gandhimathi as Manickam Mother
- Nagesh as Chinna Pannai Singaram
- Kanakadurga as Sakunthala's friend
- Samikannu as Villager
- A. Veerappan as Nattamai
- Usilai Mani as Villager
- P. S. Venkadachalam Pillai as Villager
- Comedy Shanmugam as Villager

== Production ==
Savaale Samali was promoted as Ganesan's 150th film. A scene depicting a panchayat election was shot at Gemini Studios in September 1969.

== Soundtrack ==
The music was composed by M. S. Viswanathan. P. Susheela won her second National Film Award for Best Female Playback Singer for the song "Chitukuruvikenna".

Song	Singers	Lyrics	Length
"Annai Boomi"	M. S. Viswanathan	Malliyam Rajagopal	02:30
"Chitukuruvikenna"	P. Susheela	Kannadasan	03:11
"Aanaikoru Kalam"	T. M. Soundararajan	Kannadasan	04:34
"Nilavai Paarthu Vaanam"	T. M. Soundararajan	Kannadasan	03:16
"Ennadi Mayakkama"	P. Suseela, L. R. Eswari	Kannadasan	04:34

== Bibliography ==
- Dhananjayan, G. (2014). Pride of Tamil Cinema: 1931–2013. Blue Ocean Publishers. OCLC 898765509.
- Ganesan, Sivaji; Narayana Swamy, T. S. (2007) [2002]. Autobiography of an Actor: Sivaji Ganesan, October 1928 – July 2001. Sivaji Prabhu Charities Trust. OCLC 297212002.
