= Aalemane =

1981 film directed by Mohan Kumar

- DVD cover
- Directed by: Mohan Kumar
- Produced by: D. Mallayya, M.Muniswamy, D.N.Nagarajaiah (BEL), V.Krishnamurthy, M.Manjula, Venkatamma
- Starring: Suresh Heblikar, Mohan Kumar, Roopa Chakravarthi, Upasane Seetaram
- Cinematography: B. C. Gowrishankar
- Edited by: A. Subramanya
- Music by: C Ashwath, L Vaidyanathan
- Production company: Shree Sougandhika Film Productions
- Release date: 1981
- Language: Kannada

Aalemane is a 1981 Kannada movie, starring Suresh Heblikar, Mohan Kumar, Roopa Chakravarthi and Upasane Seetaram. The film was directed by Mohan Kumar and features musical score by the Ashwath-Vaidi duo. The film was a musical hit and won the Karnataka State Film Award for Best Lyricist for Doddarange Gowda.

== Plot ==
Bhaira is a villager well known for his psychotic nature and his beautiful wife Honni. At dusk one evening, Honni is brutally raped and murdered. The villagers blame Bhaira for Honni's murder and are on the move to punish him. Bhaira confronts them with the truth, but his truth is unheard. Bhaira then seeks help of the new village teacher and asks him to trace the truth for him. Will the teacher be able to end this blame game and find the truth behind the murder?

== Cast ==
- Suresh Heblikar
- Mohan Kumar
- Roopa Chakravarthy
- Surekha
- Upasane Seetharam
- B. G. Kumbar
- Tomato Somu
- Sundara Murthy
- Shashi Kiran

== Soundtrack ==
Doddarangegowda won the Karnataka State Film Award (Special Jury Award) for his lyrics in this film.

SL.No	Song	Lyricist	Artist
1	"Nammoora Mandara Hoove"	Doddarangegowda	S. P. Balasubrahmanyam
2	"Hottare Sooryanage"	Doddarangegowda	S. P. Balasubrahmanyam, S. Janaki
3	"Ella Melu Keelu"	Doddarangegowda	C. Aswath

"Namoora Mandaara Hoove" was used as the title track for the movie Nammoora Mandara Hoove.
