= Jungle Queen =

Jungle Queen may refer to:

- Tarzan's Peril, a 1951 film often shown under its alternate title Jungle Queen
- Jungle Queen (1991 film), an Indian film
- Jungle Queen (2000 film), a Pakistani film
- Jungle Queen (serial), a 1945 Universal movie serial
- "Jungle Queen", a 1982 song by Robert Sacchi
- 'Jungle Queen', a cultivar of the Malaysian plant Alpinia purpurata
- Butterflies in the genus Stichophthalma

== See also ==
- Queen of the Jungle, a 1935 American film
- Kaattu Rani (disambiguation)
