= Anugraha (film) =

- Directed by: H. L. N. Simha
- Written by: K. M. Somasundarappa
- Screenplay by: H. L. N. Simha
- Produced by: K. M. Somasundarappa
- Starring: K. S. Ashwath; Srinath; Narasimharaju; T. N. Balakrishna
- Cinematography: R. Madhu
- Edited by: P. U. S. Manyam
- Music by: Rajan–Nagendra
- Production company: Sri Malleshwari Production
- Distributed by: Sri Malleshwari Production
- Release date: 29 March 1971
- Country: India
- Language: Kannada

Anugraha is a 1971 Indian Kannada film, directed by H. L. N. Simha and produced by K. M. Somasundarappa. The film stars K. S. Ashwath, Srinath, Narasimharaju and T. N. Balakrishna in the lead roles. The film has musical score by Rajan–Nagendra.

== Cast ==
- K. S. Ashwath as Mallanna
- Srinath as Mahadeva
- Aarathi as Gowri
- Narasimharaju
- T. N. Balakrishna
- Pandari Bai
- B. V. Radha
- Rajanand
- Dikki Madhava Rao
- Rathnakar
- Ramadevi
- Nagappa
- Eshwarappa
- Rajanand
- Sorat Nagaraj
- H. T. Urs
- Nandakumar
- Seetharam
- Shivalingu
- Rama
- Lakshmidevi
- Vasanthi
- Nirmala
- Kuppu Swamy
- Master Shivashankar
