= Nanna Prayaschittha =

Nanna Prayashchittha
- Directed by: Ugranarasimha
- Written by: M. Narendra Babu (dialogues)
- Screenplay by: V. T. Nanda Kumar; Jaswanth Kumar
- Story by: Madhu Sinha; Deeparani Sethi
- Produced by: Jaswanth Kumar
- Starring: Vishnuvardhan; Lokesh; Manjula; Rehana Sulthan
- Cinematography: S. N. Dube
- Edited by: Sebastin
- Music by: Sonik Omi
- Production company: R Kay Enterprises
- Distributed by: R Kay Enterprises
- Release date: 8 June 1978
- Running time: 119 min
- Country: India
- Language: Kannada

Nanna Prayashchittha is 1978 Indian Kannada film, directed by Ugranarasimha and produced by Jaswanth Kumar. The film stars Vishnuvardhan, Lokesh, Manjula and Rehana Sulthan in lead roles. The film had musical score by Sonik Omi.

== Cast ==
- Vishnuvardhan as Ravi
- Lokesh as Ramkumar
- Manjula as Suneetha
- Rehana Sulthan as Doctor Suma
- Asha Sachdev as Aasha
- Rajesh in guest appearance as Aanand, Suma's husband
- K. S. Ashwath in guest appearance as Suma's father
- Rakesh Pande in guest appearance as Prakash, Seeme Gowda's son
- Jayalakshmi in guest appearance as Latha
- Dinesh as Kailash
- Sampath as Judge
- Purushottham
- Paintal as Chandrashekhar
- Shakti Prasad as Seeme gowda
- Rajanand as Ravi's father
- Karan Diwan
- Raja Murad
