= Harakeya Kuri =

- DVD cover
- Directed by: K. S. L. Swamy
- Screenplay by: B. Suresha
- Based on: Harakeya Kuri by Chandrashekhara Kambara
- Produced by: K. S. L. Swamy
- Starring: Vishnuvardhan; Geetha; Prakash Rai
- Cinematography: R. Manjunath
- Edited by: Suresh Urs
- Music by: Vijaya Bhaskar
- Production company: Dharmavardhini
- Release date: 1992
- Running time: 129 minutes
- Country: India
- Language: Kannada

Harakeya Kuri (transl. Scapegoat) is a 1992 Indian Kannada-language political drama film directed and produced by K. S. L. Swamy (Lalitha Ravee). Starring Vishnuvardhan, Prakash Rai and Geetha in lead roles, the film was based on the novel of the same name by Chandrashekhara Kambara. It revolved around the theme of political influence on today's society. The film was Prakash Rai's first film as a lead character.

Based on a true story, Harakeya Kuri was critically acclaimed and went on to win National Film Award for Best Feature Film in Kannada.

== Cast ==
- Vishnuvardhan as Sidlingu
- Prakash Rai as Prakash
- Geetha as Saroja
- Srinath
- H. G. Dattatreya as Danappa
- H. G. Somashekar Rao
- Gangadhar
- Master Hirannaiah
- Ramesh Pandit
- B. M. Venkatesh
- K. S. L. Swamy
- B. Suresha as a television journalist

== Awards ==
- National Film Award for Best Feature Film in Kannada
- Karnataka State Film Award for Best Supporting Actor
