= Savithri (1979 film) =

Indian drama film

- Directed by: T. S. Ranga
- Screenplay by: T. S. Ranga
- Story by: Ram. Sha. Lokapura
- Starring: H. G. Somashekar Rao
- Cinematography: Barun Mukherji
- Edited by: J. Stanley
- Music by: Gunasingh
- Production company: Hamzu Films
- Release date: 1979
- Country: India
- Language: Kannada

Savithri ( transl. The Wife) is a 1979 Indian Kannada-language drama film directed by T. S. Ranga starring H. G. Somashekar Rao, Anil Thakker, Vasant Kumar and Ashwini. The film is based on a novel by Ram. Sha. Lokapura. The film won the Karnataka State Film Award for Second Best Film.

== Cast ==
- H. G. Somashekar Rao
- Anil Thakker
- Vasant Kumar
- Ashwini

== Reception ==
Film director Kenneth George Godwin reviewing the film at the 5th Hong Kong International Film Festival, wrote that "T.S. Ranga’s SAVITHRI – THE WIFE is an interesting film with some parallels to Phutane’s film [Sarvasakshi], but without the supernatural overtones and perhaps a bit more difficult for a non-Indian to identify with".
