= Gandhinagara =

- Directed by: K. S. L. Swamy
- Written by: GVG (Based on a short story)
- Screenplay by: S. Bhavanarayan
- Produced by: C Venku Reddy
- Starring: Rajkumar; K. S. Ashwath; Kalpana; Narasimharaju
- Cinematography: K Janakiram
- Music by: Satyam
- Production company: Vijayavardhan Movies
- Distributed by: Vijayavardhan Movies
- Release date: 1 February 1968
- Country: India
- Language: Kannada

Gandhinagara is a 1968 Indian Kannada-language film, directed by K. S. L. Swamy and produced by C Venku Reddy. The film stars Rajkumar, Kalpana, K. S. Ashwath, Balakrishna and Narasimharaju. The film had musical score by Satyam. The movie is based on a short story by GVG. Rajkumar played dual role in a small portion of the movie where the second character appears for only nine minutes towards the end of the movie.

== Plot ==
A couple's life takes an unexpected turn when the man is suspected in a murder case and imprisoned for five years on a false charge.

== Cast ==
- Rajkumar as Shekhar/Mahadevayya
- Kalpana as Shanta
- K. S. Ashwath
- Balakrishna
- Narasimharaju as Sheshappa
- Dwarakish as Prabhakara
- B. V. Radha
- Pandari Bai in a cameo

== Soundtrack ==
Music was composed by Satyam with lyrics written by Chi. Udayashankar. Satyam used the tune of the song Nee Mudida Mallige Hoovina Maale for the 1973 Telugu movie Kanne Vayasu as Ye Divilo Virisina Parijathamo. Similarly, Satyam also reused the tune of the song Kaanada Oorali for the 1982 Telugu movie Swayamvaram as Gaali Vaanalo.
