= Sigappukkal Mookkuthi =

1979 film by Valampuri Somanathan

- Theatrical release poster
- Directed by: Valampuri Somanathan
- Story by: Kannadasan
- Starring: Kamal Haasan; Vijayakumar; Sridevi; Roja Ramani; S. V. Subbaiah; Pandari Bai
- Music by: M. S. Viswanathan
- Production company: Swarnambika Films
- Distributed by: Aalamma Movies
- Release date: 12 January 1979
- Country: India
- Language: Tamil

Sigappukkal Mookkuthi (transl. Red stoned nose ring) is a 1979 Indian Tamil language film, directed by Valampuri Somanathan, starring Sridevi in the lead role. Kamal Haasan and Vijayakumar play other prominent roles.

== Plot ==
The film revolves around the life of a young, innocent woman (played by Sridevi) and her deep spiritual connection to Goddess Parvati. The narrative explores the struggles of a traditional family and the virtues of the protagonist. Sridevi's character is portrayed as the epitome of grace and devotion. A central element of the plot involves a red-stoned nose ring, which serves as a symbol of divine blessing, marital sanctity, and perhaps the trials the protagonist must endure.

== Cast ==
- Kamal Haasan
- Sridevi
- Vijayakumar
- Pandari Bai
- S. V. Subbaiah
- Roja Ramani
- Sumathi

== Production ==
For one sequence, Sridevi dressed up as the goddess Parvati.

== Soundtrack ==
The music composed by M. S. Viswanathan and lyrics for all songs were written by Kannadasan.

Track listing
| No. | Title | Singer(s) | Length |
|---|---|---|---|
| 1. | "Ambigaiye Nayagiye" | T. M. Soundararajan, T. L. Maharajan |
| 2. | "Mangala Malai Magal Varuga" | P. Susheela, Vani Jairam |
| 3. | "Aathangarai Arasamaram" | T. M. Soundararajan |
