= Driver Hanumanthu =

- Directed by: K. S. L. Swamy
- Written by: A S Murthy [dialogue]
- Story by: Usilai Somanathan
- Produced by: S. Ramanathan; S. Sivaraman
- Starring: Shivaram
- Cinematography: B Purushottham
- Edited by: Yadav Victor
- Music by: Vijaya Bhaskar
- Production company: Rashi Chithra
- Release date: 1980
- Country: India
- Language: Kannada

Driver Hanumanthu is an Indian Kannada language film released in 1980, starring Shivaram and with guest appearances by Vishnuvardhan in the role of a classical singer and Ambareesh in the role of a Church father. The film was a remake of Tamil film Sadhu Mirandal.

== Cast ==
- Shivaram
- K. S. Ashwath
- Thoogudeepa Srinivas
- Dinesh
- C. H. Lokanath
- Chethan Ramarao
- Negro Johnny

Guest appearances

- Vishnuvardhan
- Ambareesh
- Pandari Bai
- B. V. Radha
- M. N. Lakshmi Devi
- Srinath
- R. N. Sudarshan

== Soundtrack ==
Soundtrack album by Vijaya Bhaskar
- Released: 1980
- Genre: Feature film soundtrack
- Label: Sangeetha Musics

All the songs are composed and scored by Vijaya Bhaskar. The album has four tracks.

Tracklist
No.	Title	Lyrics	Singer(s)	Length
1.	"Bhooloka Aledaru"	Chi. Udaya Shankar	S. P. Balasubrahmanyam	3:03
2.	"Singari Eduru"	Chi. Udaya Shankar	S. P. Balasubramanyam	4:29
3.	"Vande"	Chi. Udaya Shankar	P. B. Sreenivas	1:07
4.	"Paapa Muddu Paapa"	Chi. Udaya Shankar	Mohan, Vani Jairam	3:18

== Reception ==
The film failed commercially.
