= Aaru Mooru Ombhatthu =

1970 film

- Directed by: K. S. L. Swamy (Ravi)
- Written by: Annapoorna (Based on Story)
- Screenplay by: Valampuri Somanathan
- Produced by: K. S. L. Swamy (Ravi)
- Starring: Udaykumar; Srinath; Ramesh; Ravi
- Cinematography: C. J. Mohan
- Edited by: Bal G. Yadav
- Music by: Vijaya Bhaskar
- Production company: Raghunandan Movies
- Distributed by: Raghunandan Movies
- Release date: 23 November 1970
- Country: India
- Language: Kannada

Aaru Mooru Ombhatthu ( transl. Six and Three is Nine) is a 1970 Indian Kannada film, directed and produced by K. S. L. Swamy. The film stars Udaykumar, Srinath, Ramesh and Ravi in the lead roles. The musical score was composed by Vijaya Bhaskar.

== Synopsis ==
Based on the story Annapoorna, the narrative centers around Suryanarayana Bhatta (played by Udaykumar) and a tight-knit web of characters including Gundanna (Srinath), Hanumanthappa (Dinesh), and a church father (Lokanath). The plot is a mystery woven around hidden family dynamics, moral choices, and interconnected relationships. It follows the escalating tensions and secrets within a small community that culminate in a final, central revelation.

== Cast ==
- Udaykumar as Suryanarayana Bhatta
- Leelavathi as Kamalabai
- B. V. Radha as Mary
- Arun Kumar as Sridhar, Mary's lover
- Srinath as Gundanna
- Ramesh as Dr Chandru
- R. N. Sudarshan as Lawyer Sripathi
- Rajesh as Inspector Ibrahim
- Dinesh
- Ravi
- K. S. Ashwath as Lawyer Rangachari
- Lokanath
