= Midida Hrudayagalu =

- Directed by: A. T. Raghu
- Written by: Shantharaj
- Based on: Engeyo Ketta Kural (1982)
- Produced by: Shantharaj; K. Sudhakar
- Starring: Ambareesh; Shruti; Nirosha
- Cinematography: J.G. Krishna
- Edited by: Victor Yadav
- Music by: Hamsalekha
- Production company: Om Shakti Chitralaya
- Release date: 1993
- Running time: 134 minutes
- Country: India
- Language: Kannada

Midida Hrudayagalu is a 1993 Indian Kannada-language romantic drama film, directed by A. T. Raghu and written by Shantharaj. The film stars Ambareesh, Shruti and Nirosha. The film is regarded as one of more popular movies of Shruti. The film is a remake of the 1982 Tamil movie Enkeyo Ketta Kural.

== Cast ==
- Ambareesh as rajanna
- Shruti as Kaveri
- Nirosha as Sampige
- Doddanna
- Rockline Venkatesh
- Lohitashwa as Rame Gowda
- Ramesh Bhat as Muddukrishna
- Sadashiva Brahmavar as Jamindar
- Agro Chikkanna
- Girija Lokesh

== Soundtrack ==
The music of the film was composed Hamsalekha who also wrote the lyrics. Audio was released on Lahari Music. The song "Tande Kodiso Seere" is popular for its lyrics lucidly expressing emotional bonds between husband and wife.

Track listing
No.	Title	Singer(s)	Length
1.	"Hosa Suggi Bandide"	S. P. Balasubrahmanyam, Manjula Gururaj, Usha Ganesh
2.	"Chandana Chandanadinda"	S. P. Balasubrahmanyam, K. S. Chithra
3.	"Devaloka Premaloka"	S. P. Balasubrahmanyam, K. S. Chithra
4.	"Nanji O Nanji"	S. P. Balasubrahmanyam, Manjula Gururaj
5.	"Thande Kodiso Seere"	Rajkumar
