= Mysore Jaana =

- VCD cover
- Directed by: A. T. Raghu
- Written by: H. V. Subba Rao
- Screenplay by: A. T. Raghu
- Produced by: A. T. Raghu
- Starring: Ambareesh; Vinaya Prasad; Anjana
- Cinematography: Sundarnath Suvarna
- Edited by: Victor Yadav
- Music by: Rajan–Nagendra
- Production company: ATR Films
- Release date: 20 April 1992
- Running time: 149 minutes
- Country: India
- Language: Kannada

Mysore Jaana is a 1992 Indian Kannada-language romantic drama film produced & directed by A. T. Raghu and written by H. V. Subba Rao. The film stars Ambareesh, Vinaya Prasad and Anjana with Doddanna, Vajramuni, Mukhyamantri Chandru, Sudheer and Lohithaswa in key supporting roles.

The film's music was composed by Rajan–Nagendra and the audio was launched on the Sangeetha music banner.

== Cast ==
- Ambareesh as Anand
- Vinaya Prasad as Asha
- Anjana
- Vajramuni as Mohan Raj
- Doddanna as Hanumanthappa
- Mukhyamantri Chandru as Chandru
- Lohithaswa as Hayagreeva Rao
- Sudheer
- Sathyajith as Byra
- Rajanand as Hulikatte Ramappa
- Usha Ganesh
- Kaminidharan as Seetha
- Umashree as Ganga
- Master Sunil as young Anand
- Mysore Lokesh
- Chikkanna
- Negro Johnny

== Soundtrack ==
The music of the film was composed by Rajan–Nagendra and lyrics written by R. N. Jayagopal.

Track listing
No.	Title	Lyrics	Singer(s)	Length
1.	"Hero Handsome Hero"	R. N. Jayagopal	S. P. Balasubrahmanyam, Manjula Gururaj
2.	"Snehada Sanketavagi"	R. N. Jayagopal	S. P. Balasubrahmanyam, Manjula Gururaj
3.	"Allaudin Chiragu Thande"	R. N. Jayagopal	S. P. Balasubrahmanyam, Manjula Gururaj
4.	"Jaana Jaana Mysore Jaana"	Shyamsundar Kulkarni	S. P. Balasubrahmanyam, Usha Ganesh
5.	"Suryakanthi Raviya Marethu"	R. N. Jayagopal	S. P. Balasubrahmanyam, Usha Ganesh
