= A. T. Raghu =

Indian filmmaker (1949 or 1950 – 2025)

- Born: Apadanda T. Raghu; 1949 or 1950; Kodagu, India
- Died: 20 March 2025 (aged 75); Bengaluru, Karnataka, India
- Occupation: Film director
- Years active: 1980–2004

Apadanda T. Raghu (1949 or 1950 – 20 March 2025) was an Indian director, actor, producer and screenplay writer, who worked in the Kannada, Hindi, Malayalam and Kodava Takk film industries.

== Background ==
Raghu was born in Kodagu to the Kodava community. He died on 20 March 2025, at the age of 75.

== Career ==
Raghu entered the cinema industry under the guidance of director and producer B. Vittalacharya. Then later he became an assistant for director Y. R. Swamy. In 1980 he independently directed Nyaya Neethi Dharma, a Kannada movie starring Ambareesh, Aarathi, Dwarakish, Sundar Krishna Urs, Jai Jagadish and K S Ashwath, produced by V. K. Ramesh. Ever since Raghu directed at least 55 movies.

He made a Hindi film Meri Adalat in 1984 starring Rajnikanth. The following year he made a Malayalam movie Kattu Rani. In 1990 he made a Kannada movie Ajay Vijay. In 1994, Raghu made the Kannada movie Mandyada Gandu starring Ambareesh, Vajramuni and Bank Janardhan. This movie had the popular song 'Mandyada Gandhu' composed by Upendra Kumar.

Raghu directed and acted in at least 55 movies out of which 23 movies starring Ambareesh (see Ambareesh filmography). Some of them are Aasha (1983), Avala Neralu (1983), Goonda Guru (1985), Antima Teerpu (1988), Mysore Jaana (1992) and Midida Hrudayagalu (1993).

He directed a documentary movie for the Government of Karnataka. Raghu worked as a coordinator with R. N. Jayagopal for the Ramayana telecast in the Kannada Language.

In more recent years, to showcase Kodava talent to the outside world and to provide a platform for Kodava artists, Raghu has made serials like Ainemane, Pombolcha, Thamane, Gejje-thand, Jamma Bhoomi and Nanga Kodava in the Kodava language. He directed and produced these six very popular Kodava Tele-serials, telecast by Bangalore Doordarshan in DD Chandana channel for over a period of 20 years

For the great works that Raghu achieved in his life, the Government of Karnataka honored Raghu with the Puttanna Kanagal Award in the year 2004–2005 and Kannada Rajyotsava Award (Rajyotsava Prashasti) in 2020. He was also a recipient of the Karnataka Film Fans Association Award, Kodava Sahitya Academy Award, Kalasagara Sangeetha Nrithya Nataka Academy Award, KANFIDA Award, RNR Award, Bangalore Doordarshan Chandana Award for cinema, Bangalore Kodava Samaja Centenary Celebration Award to name a few.

== Filmography ==
- Nyaya Neeti Dharma (1980)
- Shankar-Sundar
- Benki Chendu
- Aasha (1983)
- Avala Neralu (1983)
- Darmayudda
- Meri Adaalat (1984) (Hindi)
- Gundaguru
- Guru Jagadguru
- Kadina Raja
- Devara Mane (1985)
- Kattu Rani (1985) (Malayalam)
- Preethi (1986)
- Inspector Kranti Kumar
- Aapadbandava
- Krishna Mecchida Radhe
- Arjun
- Padma Vyuha
- Nyayakkagi Naanu
- Ajay Vijay (1990)
- Kempu Surya
- Putta Hendthi (1992)
- Mysore Jaana
- Suryodaya
- Midida Hrudayagalu (1993)
- Jailer Jagannath
- Mandyada Gandu (1994)
- Shravana Sanje
- Betegaara
- Rambo Raja Revolver Rani
- Thalwar

As actor

- Antima Teerpu (1988)
- Good Luck (2006)

== See also ==
- Meri Adalat
