= Mandyada Gandu =

1994 film by A.T. Raghu

- VCD cover
- Directed by: A. T. Raghu
- Written by: A. T. Raghu
- Produced by: A. T. Raghu
- Starring: Ambareesh; Srishanti; Meghana; Vajramuni
- Cinematography: V. K. Kannan
- Edited by: Victor Yadav
- Music by: Upendra Kumar
- Production company: A T R Films
- Release date: 1994
- Running time: 144 minutes
- Country: India
- Language: Kannada

Mandyada Gandu (transl. Man of Mandya) is a 1994 Indian Kannada-language action film produced, directed and written by A. T. Raghu starring Ambareesh, Srishanti and Meghana.

The film was widely appreciated for its songs and lead actors' performances upon release. Ambareesh (who is from Mandya) was given the film's title as a nickname after its release.

== Plot ==
Krishna is a young boy who one day is herding cattle when a car pushes him into a river. He throws stones at the windows of the car owner's house that night in retaliation, and is caught. The owner, Kalegowda, makes him walk on broken glass, while his children laugh, but Krishna doesn't cry out in pain and silently waits for revenge.

25 years later, Krishna is crowned 'Mandyada Gandu' in a cycle race. Meanwhile, Kalegowda's son Ranga tells him Krishna's father Doddegowda has died, and Kalegowda takes his land. Krishna stops Kalegowda from producing false land documents and takes the land back. While passing in a car, Krishna breaks the window of Kalegowda's daughter Radha's car and tears her clothes. Kalegowda summons all the villagers to discover who did it but Krishna never comes. Krishna meanwhile explains why he doesn't want to marry his love interest Gouri although she is in love with him. Gouri is later kidnapped by Ranga and thrown off a bridge.

Krishna stops Kalegowda from taking the villagers' crops as payment for fake loans. In retaliation, Kalegowda sends Ranga to burn Krishna's crops, but Ranga is caught. In the panchayat, Ranga is punished by Krishna in the same manner as Krishna once was, by forcing him to walk over broken glass, and Ranga cries out in pain. Angered by this, Radha comes up with a plot to defeat Krishna. At the Maaramma temple when both Radha and Krishna are present, the thali on the idol's neck appears to fall down, and the priest presents it to Krishna as prasada saying he and Radha are meant for each other. Krishna saves Radha from drowning, and Radha comes to Krishna that night and expresses her feelings for him. However, the village soon arrives with Kalegowda, and both the priest and Radha lie claiming he stole the thali and raped Radha. In the panchayat, Krishna is banished, but is soon picked up by an unknown car.

The car later picks up Kalegowda and the driver happens to be a famous movie director, Ashok Kumar, who wants to shoot a movie in Kalegowda's house, starring a Mr. Kishan and a Mrs. Gown. Ranga soon falls in love with Gown, while Radha is drawn to Kishan. Kishan tells Ranga that Gown is willing to marry him, and after Ranga signs some papers the marriage is complete. However Ranga discovers a baby with Gown, but she tells him it is for the film. Kishan takes Kalegowda and Radha to his house. Radha soon expresses her feelings for Kishan. Meanwhile, Krishna returns and reveals he was Kishan while Gouri was Gown, and Ashok Kumar tells him he wants justice done for Gouri. Krishna then goes to Radha's room and records her unknowing confession that her alleged rape was false. Krishna uses this as a bargaining chip to force Radha to reveal the truth. After leaving Kishan's house due to an urgent panchayat call, Kalegowda accepts that the allegations of rape and theft against Krishna were false.

When Gown is breastfeeding the baby, Ranga demands to know whose it is. When she says it is his, he throws it off the stairs only to be caught by Krishna. It is revealed that when Ranga kidnapped Gouri, he raped her before throwing her in the river. Ashok Kumar arranged for Ranga to unknowingly marry Gouri because of the baby that resulted from the assault. The marriage is certified by the papers Ranga unknowingly signed, and Krishna reveals he was Kishan and had slept with Radha. At first Gouri and her child are abused by the rest of the family, but Gouri gives some advice to Radha on her love for Krishna. Radha returns home and faints, and Kalegowda sends her to the hospital to get an abortion. Meanwhile, Ranga seems to develop and newfound bond with his wife and child. At the hospital Radha realizes her father lied to them and reveals she wants children and rushes back.

Ranga takes Gouri and their son to his sugar mill, but soon reveals his plan to kill them both. They are saved by Krishna, who beats up Ranga's goons and fights with Ranga and Kalegowda. Krishna is about to finish Kalegowda when Gouri pleads to spare his life. Kalegowda then takes a pistol to shoot Krishna, but instead shoots Radha's arm when she leaps in front of Krishna. She pours out her love for Krishna to her father and her desire for children, and Kalegowda feels shame for his actions and asks Krishna for forgiveness, and Ranga feels shame for how he treated Gouri and his son. The movie ends with Krishna and Radha marrying and Kalegowda blessing the couple, and Ranga, Gouri and their son reconciling.

== Cast ==
- Ambareesh as Krishna
- Srishanti
- Meghana
- Vajramuni
- Bank Janardhan
- Aravind
- Agro Chikkanna
- Sathyajith
- Rajanand
- Dwarakish in a guest appearance

== Soundtrack ==
Mandyada Gandu

Soundtrack album by Upendra Kumar
- Released: 1994
- Genre: Feature film soundtrack
- Length: 24:42
- Label: Sangeetha

The music of the film was composed by Upendra Kumar with lyrics written by R. N. Jayagopal. The album consists of five soundtracks. The title track "Mandyada Gandu" was received well.

Track listing
No.	Title	Lyrics	Singer(s)	Length
1.	"Mandyada Gandu"	R. N. Jayagopal	S. P. Balasubrahmanyam, Sangeetha Katti, chorus	5:21
2.	"Apparalli Thipparalli"	R. N. Jayagopal	S. P. Balasubrahmanyam, Sangeetha Katti	5:04
3.	"Barede Ninna Hesarannu"	R. N. Jayagopal	S. P. Balasubrahmanyam, Manjula Gururaj	4:39
4.	"Hero Bandanu Katheyali"	R. N. Jayagopal	S. P. Balasubrahmanyam, Manjula Gururaj, Usha Ganesh	5:09
5.	"Hey Prema Poojari"	R. N. Jayagopal	S. P. Balasubrahmanyam, Surya Teja, Usha Ganesh	4:29
Total length:				24:42
