= Amarnath (film) =

1978 film

- Directed by: K. Mani Murugan
- Written by: N. S. Rao (dialogues)
- Screenplay by: K. Mani Murugan
- Story by: V. K. Ramesh
- Produced by: N. K. Narayan; V. K. Ramesh; P. B. Walke
- Starring: Ambareesh; Sundar Krishna Urs; Dheerendra Gopal; K. S. Ashwath
- Cinematography: Babulnath Valke
- Edited by: R. Rajagopal
- Music by: Vijaya Bhaskar
- Production company: Shilpa Chithra
- Distributed by: Shilpa Chithra
- Release date: 25 October 1978
- Running time: 123 min
- Country: India
- Language: Kannada

Amarnath is a 1978 Indian Kannada film, directed by K. Mani Murugan and produced by N. K. Narayan, V. K. Ramesh and P. B. Walke. The film stars Ambareesh, Sundar Krishna Urs, Dheerendra Gopal and K. S. Ashwath in lead roles. The film had musical score by Vijaya Bhaskar.

== Cast ==
- Ambareesh
- Sundar Krishna Urs
- Dheerendra Gopal
- Vishnuvardhan in Guest Appearance
- K. S. Ashwath
- Musuri Krishnamurthy
- Chethan
- Ramanna Rai
- Surendra
- Venkataswamy
- Javarayya
- Tometo Somu
- Somashekar
- Kannada Raju
- Leelavathi
- Praveena
- Sreekala (Rathidevi)
- Subhadra
- Suchithra
- Prabhavathi
- Premakumari
- Gayathri

== Soundtrack ==
Hanave Ella baala tumba
