= Chinna Ninna Muddaduve =

- Directed by: A. M. Samiullah
- Written by: Salil Choudhary
- Screenplay by: A. M. Samiullah
- Produced by: A. M. Samiullah
- Starring: Vishnuvardhan; Jayanthi; Pramila Joshai; Baby Indira; Ambareesh
- Cinematography: K. Janakiram
- Edited by: T. R. Srinivasulu
- Music by: Salil Choudhary
- Distributed by: Bava Movies
- Release date: 1977
- Running time: 155 Min.
- Country: India
- Language: Kannada

Chinna Ninna Muddaduve is a 1977 Indian Kannada film written by Salil Chowdhury, with a screenplay by and produced, directed by A. M. Sameeulla. The film stars Vishnuvardhan and Jayanthi, with supporting actors Ambareesh, Pramila Joshai, and Baby Indira. The movie was remade in the same year in Hindi as Minoo. The film's soundtrack album was received well.

== Cast ==
- Vishnuvardhan
- Jayanthi
- Ambareesh
- Pramila Joshai
- Baby Indira
- M. N. Lakshmi Devi

== Soundtrack ==
1. "Jo Jo Laali", lyrics: R. N. Jayagopal, singers: K. J. Yesudas
2. "Naane Raaja Ee Oorige", lyrics: Chi. Udayashankar, singers: Sowmithri, L. R. Anjali
3. "Dehakke Usire", lyrics: R. N. Jayagopal, singers: S. P. Balasubrahmanyam, Anita Chowdhury
4. "Jo Jo Laali", lyrics: R. N. Jayagopal, singers: S. Janaki, Anita Chowdhury
