= Avala Neralu =

- Directed by: A. T. Raghu
- Written by: A. T. Raghu
- Screenplay by: A. T. Raghu
- Produced by: Magehalli Ranganath
- Starring: Ambareesh; Ambika; Vajramuni; Dinesh
- Cinematography: K. S. Mani
- Edited by: Yadav Victor
- Music by: Joy
- Production company: Raj Movies
- Release date: 23 May 1983
- Country: India
- Language: Kannada

Avala Neralu ( transl. Her shadow) is a 1983 Indian Kannada-language film, directed by A. T. Raghu and produced by Magehalli Ranganath. The film stars Ambareesh, Ambika, Vajramuni and Dinesh. The film has musical score by Joy.

== Cast ==
- Ambareesh as Raja
- Ambika as Lakshmi
- Vajramuni as Rudraiah
- Dinesh as Ramaiah
- Sundar Krishna Urs as Rangappa, Lakshmi's Brother
- Lakshman as Made Gowda
- Sudheer
- Musuri Krishnamurthy
- Rathnakar
- M. S. Umesh as Kalaiah
- Dingri Nagaraj
- Jr. Narasimharaju
- Bheema Rao
- Master Ramesh
- Sathyapriya as Lalitha, Rudrayya's wife
- Prashanthi Nayak
- Mamatha
- Mallika

== Soundtrack ==
The music was composed by Joy Raja.

No.	Song	Singers	Lyrics	Length (m:ss)
1	"Kaaveri Theerada Mele"	S. P. Balasubrahmanyam, Vani Jairam	R. N. Jayagopal	
2	"Rangeri Banthu"	P. Susheela	Vijaya Narasimha	
3	"Ninna Ballenu"	S. P. Balasubrahmanyam	Vijaya Narasimha	
4	"Sneha Premaroopa"	Vani Jairam	Vijaya Narasimha	
