= Mugdha Manava =

- Directed by: K. S. L. Swamy (Ravi)
- Written by: S. Mangala Satyan
- Screenplay by: K. S. L. Swamy (Ravi)
- Produced by: Lalithamma
- Starring: Srinath; Shubha; Kalyan Kumar; Ambareesh
- Cinematography: B. Purushottham
- Music by: Vijaya Bhaskar
- Production company: Girijamba Productions
- Distributed by: Girijamba Productions
- Release date: 1977
- Country: India
- Language: Kannada

Mugdha Manava is a 1977 Indian Kannada-language film, directed by K. S. L. Swamy (Ravi) and produced by Lalithamma. The film stars Srinath, Shubha, Kalyan Kumar and Ambareesh. The film has musical score by Vijaya Bhaskar. The film is based on a Kannada novel of the same name by Mrs. S Mangala Satyan.

== Cast ==
- Srinath
- Shubha
- Kalyan Kumar
- Ambareesh
- Uma Shivakumar
- Lokesh
- B. V. Radha
- Leelavathi
- Shivaram

== Soundtrack ==
The music was composed by Vijaya Bhaskar.

No.	Song	Singers	Lyrics	Length (m:ss)
1	"Thappanthe Sariyanthe"	S. P. Balasubrahmanyam	R. N. Jayagopal	03:08
2	"Naguve Snehada Haadu"	S. P. Balasubrahmanyam	Chi. Udayashankar	
3	"Nee Iduva Hosa Hejje"	Vani Jairam	R. N. Jayagopal	
4	"Mane Mane Thumba"	P. B. Sreenivas, B. K. Sumitra	M. Narendra Babu	
5	"Haalina Battalalli"	Ravi	R. N. Jayagopal	
