= Nyaya Neethi Dharma =

- Directed by: A. T. Raghu
- Written by: N. S. Rao (dialogues)
- Story by: V. K. Ramesh
- Produced by: V. K. Ramesh
- Starring: Ambareesh; Aarathi; Dwarakish; Sundar Krishna Urs
- Cinematography: Babulnath Valke
- Edited by: Yadav Victor
- Music by: Upendra Kumar
- Production company: Sri Narayana Productions
- Distributed by: Sri Narayana Productions
- Release date: 1980
- Running time: 128 minutes
- Country: India
- Language: Kannada

Nyaya Neethi Dharma is a 1980 Indian Kannada film directed by A. T. Raghu and produced by V. K. Ramesh. The film stars Ambareesh, Aarathi, Dwarakish and Sundar Krishna Urs in the lead roles. The film has musical score by Upendra Kumar.

== Cast ==
- Ambareesh as Kumar
- Aarathi as Revathi
- Dwarakish as Puttanna
- Sundar Krishna Urs as M. J. Peter
- Jai Jagadish as Mohan
- Gangadhar as Inspector Shekhar
- K. S. Ashwath as Kumar's father
- Arikesari
- Lakshman as John
- Babu
- N. S. Rao
- Chethan Ramarao
- Ananthram Maccheri
- Jr Narasimharaju
- Brahmavar
- Negro Johnny
- Leelavathi as Kumar's mother
- Sharmila
