= Swayamvaram (1982 film) =

1982 Telugu film directed by Dasari Narayana Rao starring Sobhan Babu

- DVD cover
- Directed by: Dasari Narayana Rao
- Written by: Dasari Narayana Rao (dialogues)
- Screenplay by: Dasari Narayana Rao
- Story by: Dasari Narayana Rao
- Produced by: D. Rama Raju; D. Vijaya Rama Raju
- Starring: Sobhan Babu; Jaya Prada; Rao Gopala Rao; Gummadi; Anjali Devi; Dasari Narayana Rao
- Cinematography: K. S. Mani
- Edited by: D. Rajagopala Rao
- Music by: Sathyam
- Production company: Lakshmi Ganesh Chitra
- Distributed by: Shayikrishna
- Release date: 6 August 1982
- Running time: 145 minutes
- Country: India
- Language: Telugu

Swayamvaram is a 1982 Indian Telugu film directed by Dasari Narayana Rao and starring Sobhan Babu, Jaya Prada, Rao Gopala Rao and Gummadi. Narayana Rao himself played a supporting role. The film marked the fifth collaboration of the director with actor Sobhan Babu. The film was released on 6 August 1982 alongside actor Krishna's Prema Nakshatram.

== Plot ==
Dharma Rao's brother-in-law, Subbarao, loses his wife and everything in a fire accident. Dharma Rao, who is in a desperate situation, takes Subbarao as his business partner. Dharma Rao's son Shekhar and Subbarao's daughter Priya have been inseparable since childhood. The business they do together goes well and both become rich. They do any new business together. They talk about any decision together and make decisions. The children grow up and become adults. Shekhar is sent abroad for studies. They want to send Priya too but cannot send her due to visa problems.

The clerk working in their company is a greedy person. Dharma Rao once reprimands him severely when he is trying to harm the business by taking bribes. The clerk uses the love of his sister, who has lost her husband, as a bait and deceives Subbarao. The brother-in-law creates a rift between the brothers-in-law. With the encouragement of the clerk, Subbarao starts a business in his daughter's name. They get along well. He convinces Dharmarao to start a business in his son's name as well. But the business suffers losses and goes bankrupt. After doing the calculations, the two separate. Dharmarao is forced to sell his own house to cover the losses. Sekhar, who is abroad, returns to India in a hurry. Learning about what happened through his mother, he confronts Subbarao. Subbarao also gets angry and starts looking for other relationships for his daughter. On the advice of his wife, Dharmarao goes to Subbarao's house and tells him to get Sekhar and Priya married. But Subbarao does not agree to it. Moreover, he hastily decides to marry him off to a man named Rajasekharam, who belongs to a zamindar family. Priya writes a letter to Shekhar asking him to take her away and gives it to her servant. But when he returns, Subbarao confronts him and tells him to lie that Shekhar hates her. He does so. Priya, heartbroken, marries Rajasekharam, whom her father had arranged.

At the same time, Dharmarao dies of a heart attack. Shekhar, who went to Priya's house immediately after the rituals, is saddened to learn about what happened through the servant. Priya's husband, Rajasekharam, is a luxurious lover. He does not come home even on the first night. He openly tells Priya about his habits and relationships and asks her to live with him only if she likes it. He tells her that he got married under the pressure of his mother. Priya, however, still has feelings for Shekhar. With the help of Ramadevi, a teacher who works at Priya's house, Shekhar wants to meet Priya and tell her the truth. But Priya still has hatred towards him. Ramadevi learns the truth from Shekhar and conveys it to Priya. Ramadevi tries to make the two of them meet and talk, but she fails. Knowing all this, Rajasekharam makes the two meet. He explains how everyone caused their separation and asks them to get married. But she does not want to get married against tradition. Finally, the story ends with Rajasekharam committing suicide and asking Shekhar to marry Priya as his last wish.

== Cast ==
- Sobhan Babu as Shekhar
- Jaya Prada as Priya
- Rao Gopala Rao as Subba Rao
- Gummadi as Dharma Rao
- Dasari Narayana Rao as Rajasekharam
- Anjali Devi as Rajasekharam's mother
- Ramaprabha as Ramadevi
- Pushpalatha
- Roopa Chakravarthy
- Gouri
- Sathya Chitra
- Master Purushottam
- Meena (actress) as Young Priya
- Master Phani Kumar

== Soundtrack ==
Swayamvaram

Soundtrack album by Sathyam
- Released: 1982
- Genre: Feature film soundtrack

Rajasri and Dasari Narayana Rao penned the lyrics for the songs composed by Sathyam. The tune of the song Gaali Vaanalo was based on Satyam's own Kannada song Kaanada Oorali from the 1968 Kannada movie Gandhinagara.

No.	Title	Lyrics	Singer(s)	Length
1.	"Nenikkada"	Rajasri	S. P. Balasubrahmanyam, P. Susheela	4:30
2.	"Musigesina Mabbullo"	Dasari Narayana Rao	S. P. Balasubrahmanyam	4:40
3.	"Harivillu"	Rajasri	S. P. Balasubrahmanyam, S.P. Sailaja, S.P. Vasantha	4:05
4.	"Aakasam Enduko"	Rajasri	S. P. Balasubrahmanyam, P. Susheela	4:23
5.	"Gaali Vaanalo"	Dasari Narayana Rao	K. J. Yesudas	6:13
6.	"Ikkada Ikkada"	Rajasri	S. P. Balasubrahmanyam, S. Janaki	4:58
