= Banashankari (film) =

- Directed by: K. S. L. Swamy (Ravi)
- Written by: Ma Lakshmanan
- Screenplay by: K. S. L. Swamy (Ravi)
- Produced by: M. Peethambaram
- Starring: K. R. Vijaya; Kalyan Kumar; K. S. Ashwath; S. Shivaram
- Cinematography: M. C. Shekar
- Edited by: E. A. Dandapani
- Music by: Vijaya Bhaskar
- Production company: Gajalakshmi Chithra
- Distributed by: Gajalakshmi Chithra
- Release date: 18 October 1977
- Country: India
- Language: Kannada

Banashankari is a 1977 Indian Kannada film, directed by K. S. L. Swamy (Ravi) and produced by M. Peethambaram. Its a remake of Tamil film "Namma veetu deivam" 1970. And telugu film "maa ilavelpu" 1971. The film stars K. R. Vijaya, Kalyan Kumar, K. S. Ashwath and S. Shivaram in the lead roles. The film has musical score by Vijaya Bhaskar.

== Cast ==
- Kalyan Kumar as Ranganatha
- K. R. Vijaya as Devi sister of Bhavani
- K. S. Ashwath as Ranganatha's Father
- M. N. Lakshmidevi as Anasuya as Ranganatha's Mother
- S. Shivaram as Ganesha
- B. V. Radha as Ganesha's Wife Ranganatha's Sister
- Udaykumar as Magician
- Ambareesh as Siddha, servant
- Thoogudeepa Srinivas as Bangari
- Puttanna Puranik
- B. Hanumanthachar
- Kodandu
- Vijaya Lalitha as Chandra
- B. Jaya
- Jayanthi as Bhavani in Guest Appearance
- C. H. Lokanath in Guest Appearance
- Bhavani in Guest Appearance
- Mysuru Lokesh in Panchayathi scene
