= Kaattu Rani (1985 film) =

- Directed by: A. T. Raghu
- Written by: M. P. Shankar
- Screenplay by: Anthikkad Mani
- Based on: Kadina Raja by A. T. Raghu
- Produced by: Unnimary
- Starring: Shankar; Unnimary; Anuradha; Sudheer
- Cinematography: Rajaram
- Edited by: N. M. Victor
- Music by: Rajan–Nagendra
- Production company: Nirmal Cine Creations
- Distributed by: Nirmal Cine Creations
- Release date: 1985
- Country: India
- Language: Malayalam

Kaattu Rani (transl. The queen of the jungle) is a 1985 Indian Malayalam-language film, directed by A. T. Raghu and produced by Unnimary. The film stars Shankar, Unnimary, Anuradha and Sudheer in the lead roles. The film has musical score by Rajan–Nagendra. The movie is a remake of director's own Kannada movie Kadina Raja which had released in the same year and had also starred Unnimary in the lead role and had music by Rajan-Nagendra and cinematography by DV Rajaram. The movie was remade in spite of the Kannada version being dubbed in Malayalam.

== Cast ==
- Shankar
- Unnimary
- Anuradha
- Sudheer

== Soundtrack ==
The music was composed by Rajan–Nagendra and the lyrics were written by Anthikkad Mani.

No.	Song	Singers	Lyrics	Length (m:ss)
1	"Aanandamekoo Anuraagamekoo"	K. J. Yesudas, S. Janaki, Chorus	Anthikkad Mani	
2	"Kaalidarunnu"	K. J. Yesudas, S. Janaki	Anthikkad Mani	
3	"Omkaari"	S. Janaki, Chorus	Anthikkad Mani	
