= Savira Mettilu =

- Directed by: Puttanna Kanagal; K. S. L. Swamy; D. B. Basave Gowda
- Written by: Dialogue: D. B. Basave Gowda; P. V. Nanjaraja Urs
- Screenplay by: P. V. Nanjaraja Urs; D. B. Basave Gowda
- Story by: P. V. Nanjaraja Urs
- Produced by: D. B. Basave Gowda
- Starring: Jayanthi; Kalyan Kumar
- Cinematography: D V Rajaram; R Manjunath; R. N. Krishna Prasad
- Edited by: M. N. Swamy
- Music by: Vijaya Bhaskar; Pravin Godkhindi
- Production company: Padmamba Productions
- Release date: 27 October 2006
- Country: India
- Language: Kannada

Savira Mettilu (transl. A thousand steps) is a 2006 Indian Kannada-language film directed by Puttanna Kanagal, K. S. L. Swamy and D. B. Basave Gowda and starring Jayanthi and Kalyan Kumar. The film was mostly shot in 1968 (in black and white) and was partially shot in 2006 (in colour)

== Cast ==
- Jayanthi as Shanthi
- Kalyan Kumar as M. S. Shekhaar
- Dikki Madhava Rao
- K. S. Ashwath as Shanti's father
- Niranjan
- Mallikarjun
- Anantharam Maccheri
- Vajramuni
- Pandari Bai
- Ambareesh
- S. P. Balasubrahmanyam
- Master Hirannaiah
- Shivaram
- Mukhyamantri Chandru
- Doddanna
- G. K. Govinda Rao
- Dayanand
- M. S. Umesh
- M. N. Lakshmi Devi
- B. Jaya
- Vaishali Kasaravalli
- Ashalatha
- B. V. Radha
- Girija Lokesh
- Hema Chaudhary
- Padma Vasanthi
- Anu Prabhakar as Anand's assistant
- Sundar Raj
- Pranava Murthy
- Shivakumar
- D. B. Basave Gowda as Anand
- Ramakrishna
- M D Kaushik
- Goa Datthu
- T N Choudappa
- Puttaraju
- Balaji Manohar
- Jr Narasimharaju
- Balakrishna
- Govindaraj

== Production ==
The film directed by Puttanna Kanagal and later by K. S. L. Swamy after Kanagal left the project. The film stopped production in 1968 before being completed in 2006 by D. B. Basave Gowda after the remaining portions of the film were shot. When this film originally began production in 1968, it marked the acting debut of Vajramuni and was to be the second film of Kanagal. Jayanthi was a part of the original film and the newer portions. D. B. Basave Gowda and Anu Prabhakar were a part of the newer portions. This was one of two films of Kanagal which was completed by Swamy after his demise, other being Masanada Hoovu (1984). The film became Swamy's final film as director before his death in 2015. Kanagal's proteges such as Ambareesh, Ramakrishna, Sundar Raj, B. V. Radha, Padma Vasanthi and Hema Choudhary agreed to be part of this film as a mark of respect for their mentor.

== Soundtrack ==
The soundtrack was composed by Vijaya Bhaskar. Flute exponent Pravin Godkhindi composed two additional songs and completed the film's background score.

== Reception ==
A critic from The Hindu appreciated "Swamy's ability to accept the challenge and resurrect the 38-year-old film despite several hurdles should be admired" and also praised Jayanthi's acting "as a teenage college going girl and as the mature woman is superb".
