= Garuda Dhwaja =

- Directed by: N. S. Rajbharath
- Produced by: Brij Chopra
- Starring: Ambareesh; Ramesh Aravind; Avinash
- Music by: Hamsalekha
- Release date: 1991
- Language: Kannada

Garuda Dhwaja is a 1991 Kannada film, directed by N. S. Raj Bharath, starring Ambareesh, Ramesh Aravind and Avinash. The movie is a remake of the 1984 Hindi movie Meri Adalat, directed by Kannada director A. T. Raghu which itself was loosely based on the 1983 Kannada movie Aasha also directed by A. T. Raghu and starring Ambareesh.

== Cast ==
- Ambareesh as Inspector Garuda
- Ramesh Aravind
- Avinash
- Sadashiva Brahmavar
