= Devaru Kotta Thangi (1973 film) =

- Poster
- Directed by: K. S. L. Swamy (Ravi)
- Written by: Ravi
- Screenplay by: G. Balasubramanyam
- Produced by: Sri Raghavendra Productions
- Starring: Rajkumar; Jayanthi; Srinath; B. V. Radha
- Cinematography: N. G. Rao
- Edited by: Bal G. Yadav
- Music by: Vijaya Bhaskar
- Production company: Sri Raghavendra Productions
- Distributed by: Sri Raghavendra Productions
- Release date: 1973
- Country: India
- Language: Kannada

Devaru Kotta Thangi is a 1973 Indian Kannada-language film, directed by K. S. L. Swamy (Ravi) and produced by Sri Raghavendra Productions. The film stars Rajkumar, Jayanthi, Srinath and B. V. Radha. The film has musical score by Vijaya Bhaskar. The movie saw a theatrical run of 17 weeks.

== Cast ==
- Rajkumar as Raghu
- Jayanthi as Shobha
- Srinath as Ramu
- B. V. Radha
- Narasimharaju as Bheema Rao
- Dwarakish as Hanumantha Rao
- Thoogudeepa Srinivas as Kalappa
- Lokanath as Rajappa
- Dr. Sampath Kumaran
- Kunigal Ramanath
- Kalavathi
- M. Jayashree
- M. N. Lakshmi Devi as Nagamma
- B. Jaya as Subbamma

== Soundtrack ==
The music was composed by Vijaya Bhaskar.

No.	Song	Singers	Lyrics	Length (m:ss)
1	"Ee Lokavella" [Happy Version]	P. B. Sreenivas	Ku Ra See	03:06
2	"Ee Lokavella" [Sad Version]	P. B. Sreenivas	Ku Ra See	03:15
3	"Laalisidalu Magana"	S. Janaki	Purandaradasa	03:37
4	Title Music ("Devaru Kotta Thangi")			02:27
