= Aasha (1983 film) =

- Directed by: A. T. Raghu
- Written by: H. V. Subba Rao
- Screenplay by: A. T. Raghu
- Produced by: R. F. Manik Chand
- Starring: Ambareesh; Arjun Sarja; Kalaranjini; Kumari Indira; Charan Raj
- Cinematography: N. R. K. Murthy
- Edited by: J. Stanly
- Music by: G. K. Venkatesh
- Production company: Varuna Productions
- Release date: 10 February 1983
- Country: India
- Language: Kannada

Aasha is a 1983 Indian Kannada film, directed by A. T. Raghu and produced by R. F. Manik Chand. The film stars Ambareesh, Arjun Sarja, Kumari Indira and Kalaranjini in the lead roles. The film has musical score by G. K. Venkatesh. The movie was remade in Hindi in 1984 as Meri Adalat starring Rajinikanth and in Malayalam in 1984 as Ivide Thudangunnu starring Mohanlal and in Tamil as Nyayam Ketkiren starring Anand Babu. Ambareesh went on to star in a 1991 movie with a similar storyline titled Garuda Dhwaja.

== Cast ==
- Ambareesh
- Arjun Sarja
- Kumari Indira
- Kalaranjini
- Charan Raj
- Vijayakashi
- Ravichandra
- B. R. Prasanna Kumar
- Vajramuni
- Dinesh
- Sundar Krishna Urs
- Shashikala
- Goodooru Mamatha
- Ashwath Narayana
- Sampangi
- Shankara Swamy
- Manjunath
- Srinivas
- Lakshman
- Thoogudeepa Srinivas in Guest Appearance
- Shakti Prasad in Guest Appearance

== Soundtrack ==
1. Dance with Me - Lyrics R N Jayagopal - S. P. Balasubrahmanyam
2. Mutto Muttu - Lyrics R N Jayagopal - Vani Jairam and Rajkumar Bharati
3. Nanda Deepa - Lyrics R N Jayagopal - Vani Jairam and S. P. Balasubrahmanyam
4. Love Me Yenuva Vayassu - Lyrics Geethapriya - Jayachandran and Vani Jairam
