= Siritanakke Savaal =

Sirithanakke Saval
- Directed by: T. R. Ramanna
- Written by: Kunigal Nagabhushan (dialogues)
- Screenplay by: Kunigal Nagabhushan
- Story by: Malliyam Rajagopal
- Produced by: C. D. Murthy
- Starring: Vishnuvardhan; Manjula Vijayakumar; K. S. Ashwath; Sampath
- Cinematography: J. G. Vijayan
- Edited by: M. S. Mani
- Music by: Vijaya Bhaskar
- Production company: Ananda Vijaya Movies
- Distributed by: Ananda Vijaya Movies
- Release date: 11 April 1978
- Running time: 155 min
- Country: India
- Language: Kannada

Sirithanakke Saval is a 1978 Indian Kannada film, directed by T. R. Ramanna and produced by C. D. Murthy. It stars Vishnuvardhan, Manjula Vijayakumar, K. S. Ashwath and Sampath in the lead roles, and has a musical score by Vijaya Bhaskar. The film was a remake of the 1971 Tamil film Savaale Samali.

== Cast ==
- Vishnuvardhan as Cheluva
- Manjula Devi as Latha
- K. S. Ashwath as Maadha, Cheluva, and Kaveri's father
- M. Jayashree as Rangi, Maadha's wife
- Sampath as Doddayya Latha, and Vishakanta's father
- Leelavathi as Lakshmi Doddayya's wife
- Dwarakish as Chikkayya
- Vajramuni as Vishakantha
- Suma as Kaveri
- Suchithra as Kempi
- Kashmiri
- Halam
- CID Shakunthala
- Ambareesh in Guest Appearance as Mariyappa
- Venkataram
- Vasanthakumar
- Kunigal Ramanath
- Jayashankar
- Shivashankar Thalageri
- Basavaraj
