= Nagarahole (film) =

- VCD cover
- Directed by: Rajendra Singh Babu
- Written by: H. V. Subba Rao (dialogues)
- Screenplay by: Rajendra Singh Babu
- Produced by: S. N. Parthanath; R. F. Manik Chand; C. H. Balaji Singh
- Starring: Vishnuvardhan; Bharathi; Master Prasad Tagat; Baby Indira; Ambareesh
- Cinematography: P. S. Prakash
- Edited by: Bal G. Yadav
- Music by: Satyam
- Production company: Varuna Pictures
- Distributed by: Mahathma Productions
- Release date: 1977
- Running time: 139 minutes
- Country: India
- Language: Kannada

Nagarahole is a 1977 Indian Kannada-language children's adventure film written by H. V. Subba Rao, with screenplay and direction by Rajendra Singh Babu. Produced under Varuna Pictures, the film starred Bharathi, Master Prasad Tagat, Master Bhanuprakash, Master Sathisha and Baby Indira in the lead roles along with Vishnuvardhan, Ambareesh and Shivaram in key supporting roles. The music for the film was composed by Satyam and cinematography was by P. S. Prakash. Inspired by Enid Blyton’s children's adventure tales, Babu conceived the story as a children's film set in a forest. Upon release, the film met with positive response from critics and audience. It went on to win the Karnataka State Award for Best Child Actor collectively for all the children who played the lead characters.

The film was dubbed in 11 languages including in Malayalam as Kaadu Njangalude Veedu, in Tamil as Yaanai Engal Thozhan and in Hindi as Bahadur Bachhe. Director Babu revealed that the base plotline was inspired by the books of Enid Blyton.

== Plot ==
During a school trip to Nagarhole National Park, teacher Madhu (Bharathi) and her students embark on an exploratory bus journey. When a few adventurous children wander off into the forest, they encounter unexpected danger. Captain Kumar (Vishnuvardhan) and the innocent bus driver Antony (Ambareesh) spring into action to locate and rescue the missing children. Their search leads to tension-filled encounters with wildlife and hidden threats in the dense forest. In an emotional turn, Madhu reunites with her estranged husband—revealed to be the missing guide—bringing a heartfelt resolution as the group safely returns from the perilous trip.

== Cast ==
- Bharathi Vishnuvardhan as Madhu
- Baby Indira as Puppy
- Master Prasad Tagat
- Master Bhanuprakash
- Master Sathish
- Vishnuvardhan as Captain Kumar (Extended cameo)
- Ambareesh as Antony, bus driver
- B. V. Radha
- Shivaram as Gundu Rao
- Uma Shivakumar as a teacher
- M. N. Lakshmi Devi as a teacher
- Sundar Krishna Urs as Mahim
- M. S. Umesh
- Shakti Prasad as forest range officer
- Dinesh as Bhoopayya, forest guard
- Chethan Ramarao as police inspector
- Satish Shankar as Ramu
- Kanchana as a tribeswoman

== Production ==
Rajendra Singh Babu wanted to make a children's adventure film completely set in a forest being inspired by the books written by Enid Blyton. He approached celebrated Kannada writer H. V. Subba Rao who went for a recce to Nagarahole for 15 days. H. V. Subba Rao wrote the film's story and added a sub plot of Naxalites lurking around the forest. He also wrote the dialogues.

The character of Ambareesh was based on a real life driver whom Babu met there. Babu revealed that the team struggled to shoot action and bravery scenes like a tiger carrying a little boy. The film was set in Nagarahole and Muthodi forests. The climax was shot on the Sakleshpura Bridge with 13 tunnels (at 165 ft in height it was Asia's highest bridge) through which Sakleshpura and Subramanya railway line passes. The film production started in 1974 and it was released in 1977 after finally finding takers.

== Soundtrack ==
Soundtrack was composed by Satyam. The song "Ille Swarga Ille Naraka" sung by Ravi and filmed on Ambareesh became hugely popular. It was remixed in the 2011 film Paagal.

No.	Title	Lyrics	Singer(s)	Length
1.	"Hey Hey Piltu"	R. N. Jayagopal	P. B. Srinivas, S. Janaki
2.	"Ee Notake Mai Matake"	Chi. Udayashankar	Bharathi, Vishnuvardhan
3.	"Ille Swarga Ille Naraka"	Chi. Udayashankar	Ravi
4.	"Nagaraholeyo Ammale"	Vijaya Narasimha	S. P. Balasubrahmanyam, S. Janaki

== Release ==
The film was dubbed in Hindi and released in Mumbai and all over India and became popular among kids of that generation.

== Accolades ==
It won Karnataka State Film Awards for 'best child actor' 1976-1977 for Prasad Tagat, Bhanuprakash, Sathish and Baby Indira.
