= Maagiya Kanasu =

- Directed by: K. S. L. Swamy
- Produced by: K. A. Gopal; Lakshman
- Starring: Srinath; Aarathi
- Cinematography: B. Purushottham
- Music by: Vijaya Bhaskar
- Release date: 1977
- Country: India
- Language: Kannada

Maagiya Kanasu is a 1977 Indian Kannada-language film, directed by K. S. L. Swamy and produced by K. A. Gopal and Lakshman. It is based on a novel by K. Saroja Rao. The film stars Srinath, Aarathi and Shubha in main roles. The film has musical score by Vijaya Bhaskar.

== Cast ==
- Srinath
- Aarathi
- Shubha
- Ambareesh
- Sathyapriya
- Chandrashekhar

== Soundtrack ==
The music was composed by Vijaya Bhaskar.

No.	Song	Singers	Lyrics	Length (m:ss)
1	"Bandide Badukina Bangarada"	Vani Jairam	Dodda Range Gowda	03:29
2	"Ellellu Neene"	S. P. Balasubrahmanyam	Ravi	03:32
3	"Neene Nanna Kavyakannake"	P. B. Sreenivas	MN. Vyasa Rao	03:13
4	"Yaako Pora Sariyo Doora"	Kasturi Shankar	Chandrashekhara Kambara	03:13
