= Shivaram =

Indian actor (1938–2021)

- Born: 28 January 1938; Choodasandra, Madras Presidency, British India
- Died: 4 December 2021 (aged 83); Bengaluru, Karnataka, India
- Occupations: Actor; film producer; director
- Years active: 1958–2021
- Spouse: Padma
- Relatives: S. Ramanathan (brother)

S. Shivaram (28 January 1938 – 4 December 2021), popularly known simply as Shivaram or Shivaramanna, was an Indian actor, producer and director whose Kannada cinema career spanned six decades. He played roles including lead hero performances, character roles, comedic roles, as well as supporting parts. He teamed up with his elder brother, S. Ramanathan and produced several films under the name Rashi Brothers apart from directing Hrudaya Sangama in 1972. They together produced movies directed by Puttanna Kanagal like Gejje Pooje and Upasane. They also produced Dr. Rajkumar 's 175th movie Nanobba Kalla and the Tamil movie Dharma Durai starring Rajinikanth which was a remake of the 1989 Kannada movie Deva. The brothers together produced few Bollywood films as well including the 1985 movie Geraftaar which is known to be the only Indian movie to star three stalwarts - Amitabh Bachchan, Kamal Haasan and Rajinikanth - in a single movie. As an actor, Shivaram has the distinction of working with many stalwart directors out of which his association with Puttanna Kanagal is much remembered. He acted in all the seven Kannada movies directed by Singeetam Srinivasa Rao starring Rajkumar.

== Early life ==
Shivaram was born in a middle class Hindu family in Choodasandra Village in Madras Presidency, a place bordering the Karnataka and Tamil Nadu states. After having his primary education completed, he moved to Bangalore city along with his elder brother Srikanteshwara, who was running, esteemed Vani typewriting & Commerce Institute. Influenced by the theater screenings of Gubbi Veeranna, Shivaram developed a strong liking towards the film-making and acting. He began to act in several stage plays and migrated to cinema in 1958 assisting various directors such as Ku. Ra. Seetharama Sastry. He also worked as a camera assistant to the veteran cinematographer Boman D. Irani.

Shivaram's first appearance as an actor on the silver screen was with Beratha Jeeva in 1965 directed and co-produced by K. R. Seetharama Sastry. Meanwhile, he was assisting various prominent directors like K. S. L. Swamy, Geethapriya, Singeetam Srinivasa Rao and Puttanna Kanagal.

== Career ==
After his stint as the assistant director from 1958 through 1965, he got his acting break in supporting role in Seetharama Shastry's Beretha Jeeva starring Kalyan Kumar. From then on, he acted with almost all the directors of the 1970s and 1980s through 2000s. Some of his most memorable performances as a character actor include Sharapanjara, Naagarahaavu, Shubhamangala; all of which are directed by Puttanna Kanagal. His comic roles were appreciated in many films such as Chalisuva Modagalu, Shravana Banthu, Haalu Jenu, Hombisilu, Hosa Belaku, Guru Shishyaru, Simhada Mari Sainya, Makkala Sainya to name a few. He appeared in the lead role in Driver Hanumanthu (1980) which was also co-produced by him. Post-2000, he switched to character roles, performing in major blockbusters such as Apthamitra, Huchcha and parallel cinemas such as Bara and Thaayi Saheba. He also acted in television series Grihabhanga, directed by Girish Kasaravalli and Baduku directed by Ravikiran.

Associating with his brother, S. Ramanathan and forming a home production named "Rashi Brothers", Shivaram co-produced many of the blockbuster and critically acclaimed movies such as Gejje Pooje (1970), Upasane (1974), Nanobba Kalla (1979), Driver Hanumanthu (1980) and Bahala Chennagide (2001).

== Death ==
Shivaram died from brain haemorrhage on 4 December 2021 at the age of 83 in a private hospital in Bangalore.

== Filmography ==
=== As director ===
Direction Filmography
Year	Film
1972	Hrudaya Sangama

=== As producer ===
Production Filmography
Year	Film	Notes
1970	Gejje Pooje	
1974	Upasane	
1979	Nanobba Kalla	
1980	Driver Hanumanthu	
1991	Dharma Durai	Tamil film
2001	Bahala Chennagide	

=== As actor (partial) ===
Year	Title	Role	Notes
1965	Beratha Jeeva		
1965	Mavana Magalu		
1966	Dudde Doddappa		
1967	Sri Purandara Dasaru		
1967	Lagna Pathrike		
1969	Namma Makkalu		
1970	Anireekshita		
1970	Mukti	Shivaram	
1971	Sharapanjara	Bhatta	
1971	Bhale Adrushtavo Adrushta		
1972	Sipayi Ramu	Lakhan Singh	
1972	Naagarahaavu	Varadha	
1972	Naa Mechida Huduga	Shankar	
1972	Hrudaya Sangama		
1973	Mooroovare Vajragalu		
1973	Edakallu Guddada Mele	Nanjunda's uncle	
1974	Upasane	Shankarabharana	
1974	Bangaarada Panjara		
1975	Hennu Samsarada Kannu		
1975	Shubhamangala	Thimma	
1975	Onde Roopa Eradu Guna	Padmanabhayya	
1975	Devara Gudi	Kitty	
1976	Hudugatada Hudugi		
1976	Mangalya Bhagya		
1976	Besuge	Ranga	
1976	Bangarada Gudi	Shami	
1977	Bayasade Banda Bhagya		
1977	Nagarahole	Gundu Rao	
1978	Sneha Sedu		
1978	Premayana	P. V. Raman	
1978	Muyyige Muyyi	Shiva	
1978	Kiladi Kittu		
1978	Hombisilu	Dr. Srinath	
1978	Priya		Also in Tamil
1978	Chithegu Chinthe		
1979	Nanobba Kalla	Puttappa	
1979	Kaadu Kudure		
1979	Dharmasere	Keshava	
1980	Driver Hanumanthu		
1980	Maria My Darling	Sundar Rao	
1980	Makkala Sainya		
1980	Bangarada Jinke	Lecturer	
1981	Simhada Mari Sainya		
1981	Mareyada Haadu		
1981	Guru Shishyaru	Vishwa	
1981	Geetha	Linganna	
1981	Gharjane		
1982	Tony	Colonel Donald Malcolm	Cameo
1982	Hosa Belaku	Raja Rao	
1982	Bara		
1982	Haalu Jenu		
1982	Hasyaratna Ramakrishna		
1982	Chalisuva Modagalu	Judge	
1982	Baadada Hoo	Raghavendra Rao	
1983	Pallavi Anu Pallavi		
1983	Gedda Maga	Ramanath	
1983	Hosa Theerpu	Govindayya	
1983	Eradu Nakshatragalu		
1983	Bhakta Prahlada	Prahlada's teacher	
1983	Chandi Chamundi	Jattappa	
1984	Bekkina Kannu		
1984	Benki Birugali	Aithal	
1984	Yarivanu		
1984	Samayada Gombe	Sub-inspector	
1984	Naane Raja	Maruthi	
1984	Bandhana	Ward boy	
1984	Shravana Banthu		
1984	Eradu Rekhegalu		
1985	Mugila Mallige		
1986	Bhagyada Lakshmi Baramma		
1988	Chiranjeevi Sudhakar		
1989	Balu Hombale	Subba Rao	
1989	Raja Kempu Roja		
1990	Halliya Surasuraru	Qasim	
1990	Gandu Sidigundu		
1990	Halli Rambhe Belli Bombe		
1990	Mangalya		
1991	Dharma Durai		Tamil film
1992	Sahasi		
1992	Ksheera Sagara		
1992	Prema Sangama		
1993	Bhagavan Sri Saibaba	Narada	
1995	Kona Edaithe	Baba	
1995	Beladingala Baale	Professor Huchuraya	
1996	Karnataka Suputra		
1997	Ammavra Ganda		
1997	Thaayi Saheba		
1999	Prathyartha	Madhav	
2000	Hats Off India		
2001	Yajamana	Hotel owner	
2001	Lankesha		
2001	Jipuna Nanna Ganda		
2002	Simhadriya Simha		
2002	Hrudayavantha		
2003	Raja Narasimha		
2004	Apthamitra	Rangajja	
2006	Paramasivan		Tamil film
2006	Savira Mettilu		
2007	Sajni		
2009	Ghauttham		
2009	Bellary Naga		
2010	Kiladi Krishna	Narayana Rao	
2012	Breaking News	Karmananda	
2013	Bhajarangi		
2013	Mugila Chumbana		
2015	Shivam		
2015	Care of Footpath 2		
2016	...Re	Govinda Rao Sharmana "Samskrutha"	
2016	Hey Sarasu		
2016	Mukunda Murari	Swamiji	
2016	Sri Omkara Ayyappane		
2017	Bangara s/o Bangarada Manushya		
2017	Once More Kaurava		
2021	Snehitha		
2021	Drishya 2	Tea shop owner	
2022	Tajmahal 2	Purohit	
2022	Aavartha		
2023	Vidhi (Article) 370		
2023	Gadhayuddha	Astrologer	
2025	Rhythm	Warden	Posthumous release

== Awards ==
- 2013 - Padmabhushan Dr. B. Sarojadevi National Award.
- 2010-11 - Dr. Rajkumar Lifetime Achievement Award from Karnataka Government.
