= B. V. Radha =

Indian actress (1948–2017)

- Born: Rajalakshmi; 15 August 1948; Bangalore, Mysore State, India
- Died: 10 September 2017 (aged 69); Bangalore, Karnataka, India
- Occupations: Actress, film producer
- Spouse: K. S. L. Swamy (m. 1973; died 2015)

Bengaluru Vijaya Radha (15 August 1948 – 10 September 2017), commonly known as B. V. Radha, was an Indian actress and film producer. She began her career in the 1964 Kannada film Navakoti Narayana. She went on to play mostly supporting roles in over 300 films, 250 of which were in Kannada, and the rest in Tamil, Telugu, Malayalam, Tulu and Hindi.

She was married to film director K. S. L. Swamy. Following her career in cinema, she associated herself with theatre, performing plays with her troupe, Natavranda. Recognizing her contribution to theatre and cinema, Radha was awarded the Kanaka Ratna Award by Kaginele Kanaka Guru Peetha, a spiritual and cultural center, in 2010. She was credited as Kumari Radha in Tamil industry.

== Early life and career ==
Radha was born as Rajalakshmi in 1948 into a farming family. Interested in becoming an actress, she quit school to enter cinema. She made her debut in the 1964 Kannada film Navakoti Narayana, in which Rajkumar played the lead role. She played a notable role in the Tamil film Thazampoo in 1966. She acted alongside all top actors of south Indian cinema in the 1960s and 1970s, such as M.G. Ramachandran, Sivaji Ganesan, N. T. Rama Rao, Gemini Ganesan, Akkineni Nageswara Rao and Jaishankar.

== Death ==
Radha died on 10 September 2017, due to heart attack.

== Partial filmography ==
=== Kannada ===
- Navakoti Narayana (1964)
- Thoogudeepa (1966)
- Premamayi (1966)
- Kiladi Ranga (1966)
- Deva Maanava (1966)
- Rajadurgada Rahasya (1967)
- Onde Balliya Hoogalu (1967)
- Manasiddare Marga (1967)
- Lagna Pathrike (1967)
- Simha Swapna (1968) as Menaka
- Manku Dinne (1968)
- Manassakshi (1968)
- Hannele Chiguridaga (1968)
- Gandhinagara (1968)
- Bhagyada Bagilu (1968)
- Bhagya Devathe (1968)
- Bangalore Mail (1968)
- Bedi Bandavalu (1968)
- Attegondu Kaala Sosegondu Kaala (1968)
- Mukunda Chandra (1969)
- Mayor Muthanna (1969)
- Makkale Manege Manikya (1969)
- Choori Chikkanna (1969)
- Bhale Raja (1969)
- Rangamahal Rahasya (1970) as Miss Sheela
- Namma Mane (1970)
- Mooru Muttugalu (1970)
- Modala Rathri (1970)
- Lakshmi Saraswathi (1970)
- Gejje Pooje (1970)
- Bhale Jodi (1970)
- Arishina Kumkuma (1970)
- Anireekshitha (1970)
- Aaru Mooru Ombathu (1970)
- Bhale Adrushtavo Adrushta (1970)
- Anugraha (1970)
- Amarabharathi (1971)
- Anugraha (1971)
- Naguva Hoovu (1971)
- Bangaarada Manushya (1972)
- Kranti Veera (1972)
- Yaava Janmada Maitri (1972)
- Nanda Gokula (1972)
- Jwala Mohini (1973)
- CID 72 (1973)
- Devaru Kotta Thangi (1973)
- Mahadeshwara Pooja Phala (1974)
- Shubhamangala (1975)
- Mane Belaku (1975)
- Banashankari (1977)
- Mugdha Manava (1977)
- Pavana Ganga (1977)
- Nagara Hole (1977)
- Vamsha Jyothi (1978)...Girija
- Muthaide Bhagya (1983)
- Gowri Kalyana (1991)
- Chinna (1994)
- Ibbara Naduve Muddina Aata (1996)
- Cheluva (1997)
- Kalavida (1997)
- Simhada Mari (1997)
- Thutta Mutta (1998)
- Hoomale (1998)
- Gadibidi Krishna (1998)
- Chandramukhi pranasakhi (1999)
- Snehaloka (1999)
- Partha (2003)
- Ajju (2004)
- Thandege Thakka Maga (2006)
- Savira Mettilu (2006)

=== Tamil: Credited as Kumari Radha ===
- Needhikkuppin Paasam (1963) as Jaya
- Thazhampoo (1965) as Kaveri
- Vazhikaathi (1965) as Revathi
- Yaar Nee? (1966) as Rama
- Kathal Paduthum Padu (1966) as Lalli
- Thayin Mel Aanai (1966)
- Kadhalithal Podhuma (1967) as Manju's sister
- Naan (1967)
- Naan Yaar Theriyuma (1967)
- Pen Endral Pen (1967)
- Rajathi (1967)
- Sundharamoorthi Nayanar (1967)
- Nimirndhu Nil (1968)
- Sathiyam Thavaradhey (1968)
- Neeyum Naanum (1968)
- Ponnu Mappillai (1969)
- Thanga Surangam (1969)
- CID Shankar (1970) as Rama

=== Telugu ===
- Aame Evaru? (1966)

=== Malayalam: Credited as Kumari Radha ===
- Bhakta Kuchela (1961) as Dancer
