= K. S. L. Swamy =

Indian film director (1939–2015)

- Born: Kikkeri Shamanna Lakshminarasimha Swamy; 21 February 1939; Kikkeri, Mysore district, Kingdom of Mysore, British India (now Mandya district, Karnataka, India)
- Died: 20 October 2015 (aged 76); Bangalore, India
- Other names: Ravi, Ravee, Lalitha Ravi
- Occupations: Film director, producer, actor, playback singer
- Known for: Jamboo Savari (1989)
- Spouse: B. V. Radha (1973–2015; his death)
- Children: 2

Kikkeri Shamanna Lakshminarasimha Swamy (21 February 1939 – 20 October 2015), popularly known as K. S. L. Swamy / Lalitha Ravee / Ravee, was an Indian film director, producer, actor and playback singer. He started his cinema career at an early age as an assistant to popular directors of the time such as G. V. Iyer and M. R. Vittal. He debuted as an independent film director with the 1966 film Thoogudeepa. His other films such as Gandhinagara (1968), Bhagya Jyothi (1975) and Malaya Marutha (1986) proved successful. His 1989 film Jamboo Savari won the National Film Award for Best Children's Film at the 37th National Film Awards.

Swamy was a close associate of director Puttanna Kanagal, and completed two of his films – Masanada Hoovu (1984) and the long delayed Saavira Mettilu that released in 2006, following the latter's death, which also turned out be his own last directorial venture. Recognizing his contribution to cinema, Swamy was awarded the Dr. B. Saroja Devi National Award in 2013. He was married to actress B. V. Radha.

Swamy was also an adept singer, well known for the track "Suryangu Chandrangu" from the film Shubhamangala and "Ille Swarga Ille Naraka" from Nagarahole. Swamy died on 20 October 2015 due to breathing complications at Bangalore.

== Filmography ==
=== As director ===
- Thoogudeepa (1966)
- Lagna Pathrike (1967)
- Gandhinagara (1968)
- Bhagyada Bagilu (1968)
- Manku Dinne (1968)
- Anna Thamma (1968)
- Arishina Kumkuma (1970)
- Lakshmi Saraswathi (1970)
- Aaru Mooru Ombhatthu (1970)
- Bhale Adrushtavo Adrushta (1971)
- Sri Krishna Rukmini Satyabhama (1971)
- Kulla Agent 000 (1972)
- Devaru Kotta Thangi (1973)
- CID 72 (1973)
- Bhagya Jyothi (1975)
- Makkala Bhagya (1976)
- Thulasi (1976)
- Devara Duddu (1977)
- Maagiya Kanasu (1977)
- Mugdha Manava (1977)
- Banashankari (1977)
- Aluku (1977)
- Driver Hanumanthu (1980)
- Bhoomige Banda Bhagavantha (1981)
- Jimmy Gallu (1982)
- Matthe Vasantha (1983)
- Kranthiyogi Basavanna (1983)
- Mutthaide Bhagya (1983)
- Karune Illada Kanoonu (1983)
- Huli Hejje (1984)
- Pithamaha (1985)
- Malaya Marutha (1986)
- Mithileya Seetheyaru (1988)
- Jambu Savari (1989)
- Harakeya Kuri (1992)
- Maha Edabidangi (1999)
- Savira Mettilu (2006)... co-directed

=== As actor ===
- 1992 Harakeya Kuri
- 2004 Jyestha
- 2004 Bidalare
- 2004 Malla
- 2005 Mazhai (Tamil)
- 2006 Mohini 9886788888
- 2006 Hatavadi
- 2007 Sri Danamma Devi
- 2008 Haage Summane
- 2009 Meghave Meghave
- 2010 Nanjanagoodu Nanjunda
- 2010 Shourya
- 2012 Gandhi Smiles
- 2016 Doddmane Hudga
- 2016 One Time
