= Vishnuvardhan filmography =

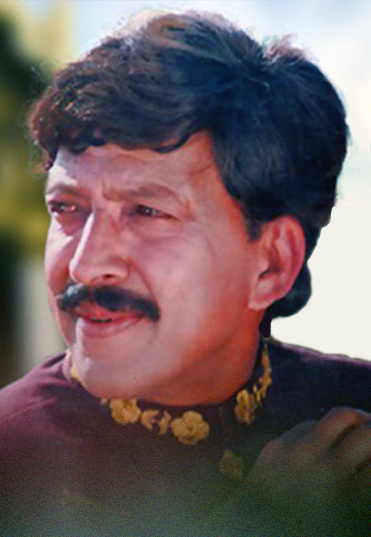
Vishnuvardhan in 1997 Kannada film Ellaranthalla Nanna Ganda

This is the filmography of Indian actor Sampath Kumar (1950 – 2009), who was professionally known as Vishnuvardhan.

== Kannada films ==
=== 1970s ===
List of Vishnuvardhan Kannada films and roles
Year	Film	Role(s)	Notes
1972	Vamsha Vriksha	Prithvi	Credited as Kumar
1972	Naagarahaavu	Ramachari	Karnataka State Film Award for Best Actor
1973	Seethe Alla Savithri	Shankara	
1973	Mane Belagida Sose	Gopi	
1973	Gandhada Gudi	Anand	
1974	Bhootayyana Maga Ayyu	Gulla	
1974	Professor Huchuraya	Venu	
1974	Anna Attige	Ravi	
1975	Devara Gudi	Sundar	
1975	Koodi Balona	Narahari	
1975	Kalla Kulla	Mahesh (Kalla)	
1975	Bhagya Jyothi	Nagesh	
1975	Nagakanye	Prince	
1975	Onde Roopa Eradu Guna	Ashok / Vikram	Dual role
1976	Devaru Kotta Vara	Shankar	
1976	Hosilu Mettida Hennu		
1976	Makkala Bhagya	Shekhar	
1976	Bangarada Gudi	Vijay	
1977	Bayasade Banda Bhagya	Raamu	
1977	Sose Tanda Soubhagya	Shekhara	
1977	Nagarahole	Kumar	Also playback singer
1977	Chinna Ninna Muddaduve	Raamu	
1977	Shrimanthana Magalu	Shankar	
1977	Sahodarara Savaal	Kiran	
1977	Shani Prabhava		
1977	Galate Samsara	Vasudeva Rao	
1977	Kittu Puttu	Kittu	
1978	Hombisilu	Dr. Nataraj	
1978	Sandharbha	Professor	Cameo
1978	Kiladi Kittu	Kittu	
1978	Vamsha Jyothi	Mahesh	
1978	Muyyige Muyyi	Sanjay	
1978	Siritanakke Savaal	Cheluva	
1978	Prathima		
1978	Nanna Prayaschittha	Ravi	
1978	Sneha Sedu	Rajesh	
1978	Kiladi Jodi	George	
1978	Vasantha Lakshmi	Chandru	
1978	Amarnath		Cameo
1978	Bhale Huduga	Ravi	
1978	Madhura Sangama	Kumara Rama	Special appearance in ballet
1978	Singaporenalli Raja Kulla	Raja	
1979	Asadhya Aliya	Ashok	
1979	Vijay Vikram	Vijay/Vikram	Double role
1979	Naniruvude Ninagagi	Vijay	
1979	Manini	Gireesh	Cameo
1979	Nentaro Gantu Kallaro	Shankar	

=== 1980s ===
List of Vishnuvardhan Kannada films and roles
Year	Film	Role(s)	Notes
1980	Nanna Rosha Nooru Varusha	Aanand	
1980	Rama Parushurama	Rama	
1980	Kaalinga	Kaalinga/Prabhakar Patil	Double role
1980	Hanthakana Sanchu	Dr. Murali	
1980	Makkala Sainya	Shivaram	Simultaneously made in Tamil as Mazhalai Pattalam
1980	Biligiriya Banadalli	Lakshmana	
1980	Simha Jodi	Prakash	
1980	Rahasya Rathri	Vijay	
1980	Bangarada Jinke	Veeru / Charu	
1980	Driver Hanumanthu		Cameo
1981	Mane Mane Kathe	Subbu	
1981	Naga Kala Bhairava	Naga & Kaala	Double Role
1981	Maha Prachandaru	Nataraja	
1981	Guru Shishyaru	Maharaja Nandivardhana	
1981	Snehitara Savaal	Jagan	
1981	Avala Hejje	Dr. Ramu	
1981	Preetisi Nodu	mOHAN	
1982	Pedda Gedda	Lawyer Murthy	Cameo
1982	Sahasa Simha	Pratap	Also playback singer
1982	Karmika Kallanalla	Mohan	
1982	Oorige Upakari	Srikanth	Double role
1982	Jimmy Gallu	Kereyeri aka Jimmy	Also playback singer for "Tuttu Anna Tinnokke"
1982	Suvarna Sethuve	Rajagopal	
1982	Onde Guri	Kumar	
1982	Kallu Veene Nudiyithu	Paandu/Shankara Shastry	Double role
1983	Sididedda Sahodara	Dilip/Pradeep	Double role; also playback singer
1983	Muthaide Bhagya	Cameo	
1983	Gandharva Giri	Ravindra	
1983	Gandugali Rama	Raama	
1983	Chinnadantha Maga	Guruprasad	
1983	Simha Garjane	'Lion' Jayasimha	
1983	Prachanda Kulla	Shiva	Cameo
1984	Rudranaga	Naga	
1984	Khaidi	Surya	
1984	Benki Birugali	Vishnu	
1984	Indina Ramayana	Shankar	
1984	Bandhana	Dr. Harish	
1984	Huli Hejje	Soma	
1984	Chanakya	Lawyer Srikanth	
1984	Aaradhane	Rajesh	
1984	Madhuve Madu Tamashe Nodu	Ganesha	
1985	Jeevana Chakra	Ranga	
1985	Karthavya	Inspector Vijay	
1985	Maha Purusha	Raaja	
1985	Veeradhi Veera	Shankar	
1985	Nee Bareda Kadambari	Ajay Kumar	
1985	Mareyada Manikya	Santhosh (Mysore Huli)	
1985	Nanna Prathigne	Shankar	
1985	Nee Thanda Kanike	Ravi	
1986	Karna	Karna	
1986	Kathanayaka	Prabhakar / Ranga	
1986	Ee Jeeva Ninagagi	Chandrasekhar	
1986	Sathya Jyothi	Ravi Varma	100th Kannada film
1986	Krishna Nee Begane Baro	Krishna	
1986	Malaya Marutha	Vishwanatha	
1987	Premaloka	Professor Manohar	Extended Cameo; simultaneously shot in Tamil as Paruva Ragam
1987	Sowbhagya Lakshmi	Chandru and Shyam	Double role
1987	Karunamayi	Raja	
1987	Jayasimha	Forest Officer Jayasimha	
1987	Aaseya Bale	Ajay/Gurudatth	
1987	Jeevana Jyothi	K. Ravi	
1987	Shubha Milana	Ravi	
1987	Sathyam Shivam Sundaram	Satyaraj/Shivaraju/Sunder	Triple role
1988	December 31	Raja Veer	
1988	Olavina Aasare	Jayanth	
1988	Nammoora Raja	Raja	
1988	Jana Nayaka	Janardhan	
1988	Suprabhatha	Vijay Kumar	
1988	Krishna Rukmini	Krishna	
1988	Daada	Daada/Gururaj	Double role
1988	Mithileya Seetheyaru	S. K. Kumar	Cameo
1989	Ondagi Balu	Satyadev	
1989	Hrudaya Geethe	Ashok	
1989	Rudra	Rudra	
1989	Deva	Deva	
1989	Doctor Krishna	Dr. Krishna	

=== 1990s ===
List of Vishnuvardhan Kannada films and roles
Year	Film	Role(s)	Notes
1990	Shivashankar	Shiva/Shankara	Double role
1990	Muthina Haara	Major Achchappa	
1990	Mathe Haditu Kogile	Anand	
1991	Lion Jagapathi Rao	Jagapathi Rao/Kumar Raja	Double role
1991	Neenu Nakkare Haalu Sakkare	Subba Rao	
1991	Jagadeka Veera	Prathap	
1991	Police Mathu Dada	Inspector Dhanush / Vishnu Pratap	Double role; simultaneously made in Hindi as Inspector Dhanush
1992	Rajadhi Raja	Raja	
1992	Ravivarma		
1992	Harakeya Kuri	Sidlingu	
1992	Nanna Shathru	Ashok	
1992	Belliyappa Bangarappa	Cameo	
1993	Sangharsha	Mahesh	
1993	Vaishakada Dinagalu	Vishnu	
1993	Nanendu Nimmavane	V. Gopal Krishna	
1993	Rayaru Bandaru Mavana Manege	Vishnu	
1993	Vishnu Vijaya	ACP Vishnu	Simultaneously made in Hindi as Ashaant
1993	Manikantana Mahime	Ayyappa	
1993	Nishkarsha	ATS] Commando Ajay Kumar	
1994	Time Bomb	DCP Vishwanath	
1994	Kunthi Puthra	Surya / Ravi	
1994	Samrat	Samrat	
1994	Mahakshathriya	Pratap	
1994	Halunda Thavaru	Siddarth	
1994	Kiladigalu	Kittappa/Krishna	Double role
1994	Kotreshi Kanasu	N. Kumar, Education Minister	Government of Karnataka |Cameo
1995	Yama Kinkara	Yama Kinkara/Chikkubukku	
1995	Deergha Sumangali	Adithya	Cameo
1995	Kona Edaithe	Advocate Vishnu	Cameo
1995	Mojugara Sogasugara	Vijay/Vinod	Double role
1995	Bangarada Kalasa	Naagaraja	
1995	Thumbida Mane	Ramanna	
1995	Karulina Kudi	Nandan	
1995	Himapatha	Aravind-Gautham	
1996	Appaji	Appaji/Shakthi	Double role
1996	Hello Daddy	Prakash	
1996	Karnataka Suputra	Vishnu Pratap	
1996	Dhani	Gopinath Rao	
1996	Jeevanadhi	Sagar	
1996	Baalina Jyothi	Vishwa	
1997	Mangalasoothra	Chandrakanth	
1997	Ellaranthalla Nanna Ganda	Surya	
1997	Shruthi Hakida Hejje	Dr. Kumar	Cameo
1997	Janani Janmabhoomi	Dr. Yeshwanth	
1997	Laali	Krishnakumar	
1998	Nishyabda	Major Vishwanath	
1998	Yaare Neenu Cheluve	Vishnu	Cameo
1998	Simhada Guri	Bhagath	
1998	Hendthighelthini	Jayaram	
1999	Veerappa Nayaka	Veearappa Nayaka	
1999	Habba	Vishnu	
1999	Surya Vamsha	Satya Murthy/Kanaka Murthy	Double role
1999	Premotsava	Bharath	

=== 2000s ===
List of Vishnuvardhan Kannada films and roles
Year	Film	Role(s)	Notes
2000	Soorappa	Soorappa	
2000	Deepavali	Ravindranath aka Ravi	
2000	Nan Hendthi Chennagidale	ACP Rajiv Vijay Raghav	Cameo
2000	Yajamana	Shankara/Ganesha	Double role
2001	Diggajaru	Doddayya/Chikkayya	Double role
2001	Kotigobba	Nanjunda aka Jayasimha	
2002	Parva	Sagar	
2002	Jamindaru	Bettappa/Biligiri	Double role
2002	Simhadriya Simha	Narasimha Gowda/ Simha Jr/ Chikkanna	Triple role
2003	Raja Narasimha	Raja Narasimha	
2003	Hrudayavantha	Shivappa	
2004	Kadamba	ACP Madhukeshwar Kadamba	
2004	Apthamitra	Dr. Vijay	
2004	Sahukara	Raja Ravivarma	Extended Cameo
2004	Jyeshtha	Vishnu	
2005	Varsha	Sathyamurthy	
2005	Vishnu Sena	Prof. Jayasimha	
2006	Neenello Naanalle	Veeru	
2006	Sirivantha	Narayana Murthy	
2007	Ekadantha	Vijay	
2007	No 73, Shanthi Nivasa	Himself	Cameo
2007	Maathaad Maathaadu Mallige	Hoovaiah	
2007	Ee Bandhana	Harish Raj	
2007	Kshana Kshana	DCP Vishnu	Extended Cameo
2008	Jnana Jyothi Sri Siddaganga	Special appearance	
2008	Nam Yajamanru	Shashank	
2009	Bellary Naga	Nagamanikya	

=== 2010s ===
List of Vishnuvardhan Kannada films and roles
Year	Film	Role(s)	Notes
2010	School Master	Jagannath	Posthumous release
2010	Aptharakshaka	Dr. Vijay / Vijaya Rajendra Bahadoor	Double role/posthumous release
2016	Nagarahavu (Note: Vishnuvardhan was recreated using computer graphics.)	Prince	Created by Computer Graphics
2018	Rajasimha	Narasimhe Gowda	Cameo; Created by Computer Graphics

=== 2020s ===
List of Vishnuvardhan Kannada films and roles
Year	Film	Role(s)	Notes
2025	Choo Mantar	Captain	Cameo; Created by Computer Graphics
2026	Raktha Kashmira	Himself	Posthumous final film release; Special appearance in the song "Star Star"

== Other language films ==
=== 1970s ===
List of Vishnuvardhan other language films and roles
Year	Film	Role(s)	Language	Notes
1973	Alaigal	Inspector Raju	Tamil	

=== 1980s ===
List of Vishnuvardhan other language films and roles
Year	Film	Role(s)	Language	Notes
1980	Mazhalai Pattalam	Shivaraman alias Gowri Manohari	Tamil	Simultaneously shot in Kannada as Makkala Sainya
1981	Adima Changala		Malayalam	
1984	Ek Naya Itihas		Hindi	Unreleased, lost film
1985	Eetti	Inspector Prasad	Tamil	
1985	Sri Raghavendrar	Sri Yogenthra Tirtha	Tamil	
1986	Viduthalai	Amar	Tamil	
1987	Paruva Raagam	Professor Manohar	Tamil	Extended cameo; simultaneously shot in Kannada as Premaloka
1987	Sardar Dharmanna		Telugu	

=== 1990s ===
List of Vishnuvardhan other language films and roles
Year	Film	Role(s)	Language	Notes
1991	Inspector Dhanush	Dhanush, Vishnu Pratap Rao	Hindi	Double role; Simultaneously shot in Kannada as Police Mathu Dada
1992	Kauravar	Haridas IPS	Malayalam	
1993	Ashaant	Vishnu	Hindi	Simultaneously shot in Kannada as Vishnu Vijaya
1994	Zaalim	Inspector Mohan	Hindi	

=== 2000s ===
List of Vishnuvardhan other language films and roles
Year	Film	Role(s)	Language	Notes
2000	Okkadu Chalu	Major Bhargava	Telugu	
