= List of Kannada songs recorded by Vani Jairam =

Vani Jairam is an Indian playback singer who has sung over 4,000 songs. She has sung nearly 600 songs in Kannada films. The following is a list of Kannada songs recorded by her:

== film songs ==
=== 1970s ===
Year	Film	Song	Composer(s)	Writer(s)	Co-artist(s)
1973	Kesarina Kamala	"Abbabba Elliddalo Kaane"	Vijaya Bhaskar	R. N. Jayagopal	L. R. Anjali
1973	Kesarina Kamala	"Nagu Nee Nagu"	Vijaya Bhaskar	R. N. Jayagopal	solo
1974	Bhootayyana Maga Ayyu	"Sobaana Sobaana	G. K. Venkatesh	R. N. Jayagopal	solo
1974	Eradu Kanasu	"Endendu Ninnanu Maretu"	Rajan–Nagendra	Chi. Udaya Shankar	P. B. Sreenivas
1974	Upasane	"Bhaavavemba Hoovu Arali"	Vijaya Bhaskar	Chi. Udaya Shankar	solo
1974	Upasane	"Bhaavayya Bhaavayya"	Vijaya Bhaskar	R. N. Jayagopal	solo
1974	Upasane	"Bhaavayya Bhaavayya"	Vijaya Bhaskar	R. N. Jayagopal	solo
1975	Bhagya Jyothi	"Kumkuma Haneyali"	Vijaya Bhaskar	R. N. Jayagopal	P. B. Sreenivas
1975	Bhagya Jyothi	"Divya Gagana Vanvasini"	Vijaya Bhaskar	P. B. Sreenivas	P. B. Sreenivas
1975	Bili Hendthi	"Aa Devare Nudida"	Vijaya Bhaskar	Vijaya Narasimha	solo
1975	Bili Hendthi	"Happiest Moments"	Vijaya Bhaskar	Vijaya Narasimha	solo
1975	Bili Hendthi	"Rangena Halliyage"	Vijaya Bhaskar	Vijaya Narasimha	Kasturi Shankar
1975	Devara Kannu	"Ninne Sanje Alli Nodide"	T. G. Lingappa	Chi. Udaya Shankar	solo
1975	Kalla Kulla	"Suthha Muthha Yaaru Illa"	Rajan–Nagendra	Chi. Udaya Shankar	P. B. Sreenivas
1975	Mahadeshwara Pooja Phala	"Daye Thoru Mahadeswara"	C. Satyam	Chi. Udaya Shankar	solo
1975	Mahadeshwara Pooja Phala	"Vishweswara Gangadhara"	C. Satyam	Chi. Udaya Shankar	solo
1975	Shubhamangala	"Shubhamangala Sumuhurthave"	Vijaya Bhaskar	Kanagal Prabhakara Shastry	P. B. Sreenivas
1975	Shubhamangala	"Hema Naakondla Naaku"	Vijaya Bhaskar	Vijaya Narasimha	solo
1975	Vasantha Lakshmi	"Hennugalendoo Abaleyaralla"	Vijaya Bhaskar	Chi. Udaya Shankar	S. Janaki
1975	Vasantha Lakshmi	"Kannu Kannu Bittukondu"	Vijaya Bhaskar	Chi. Udaya Shankar	S. P. Balasubrahmanyam, K. J. Yesudas, Vani Jairam
1975	Vasantha Lakshmi	"Belli Modave Yelli Oduve"	Vijaya Bhaskar	R. N. Jayagopal	S. P. Balasubrahmanyam
1976	Bangarada Gudi	"Rasikane Baa"	G. K. Venkatesh	Chi. Udaya Shankar	solo
1976	Bangarada Gudi	"Arerare Arerare"	G. K. Venkatesh	Chi. Udaya Shankar	S. P. Balasubrahmanyam
1976	Bayalu Daari	"Kanasalu Neene, Manasalu Neene"	Rajan–Nagendra	Chi. Udaya Shankar	S. P. Balasubrahmanyam
1976	Besuge	"Besuge Besuge"	Vijaya Bhaskar	Geethapriya	S. P. Balasubrahmanyam
1976	Besuge	"Vasantha Baredanu"	Vijaya Bhaskar	Vijaya Narasimha	S. P. Balasubrahmanyam
1976	Besuge	"Life Is a Merry Melody"	Vijaya Bhaskar	R. N. Jayagopal	solo
1976	Makkala Bhagya	"O Gelati Nannane"	Vijaya Bhaskar	N/A	S. P. Balasubrahmanyam
1976	Naa Ninna Mareyalare	"Naa Ninna Mareyalare"	Rajan–Nagendra	Chi. Udaya Shankar	Rajkumar
1976	Phalitamsha	"Pyateyinda Bandavane"	Vijaya Bhaskar		S. P. Balasubrahmanyam
1976	Phalitamsha	"Love Endare"	Vijaya Bhaskar		solo
1976	Premada Kanike	"Naa Bidalare Endu Ninna"	Upendra Kumar	Vijaya Narasimha	Rajkumar
1977	Kokila	"Gum Gum Endu Dumbigalu Haradi"	Salil Chowdhury	Chi. Udaya Shankar	S. P. Balasubrahmanyam
1977	Kumkuma Rakshe	"Baadada Hoovaagu"	Vijaya Bhaskar		solo
1977	Maagiya Kanasu	"Bandide Badukina Bangarada"	Vijaya Bhaskar	Dodda Range Gowda	solo
1978	Aparichita	"Savi Nenapugalu Beku"	L. Vaidyanathan	P. R. Ramadas Naidu	solo
1978	Sneha Sedu	"Mathonda Olle Mathonda"	S. Rajeswara Rao	Chi. Udaya Shankar	solo
1978	Sneha Sedu	"Ore Nota Vayyari Aata"	S. Rajeswara Rao	Chi. Udaya Shankar	solo
1978	Sneha Sedu	"Naagaraaniyu Horage Bandalu"	S. Rajeswara Rao	Chi. Udaya Shankar	solo
1978	Shankar Guru	"Eneno Aase Nee Thanda"	Upendra Kumar	Chi. Udaya Shankar	Rajkumar
1978	Thappida Thala	"Olavinda Nalle"	Vijaya Bhaskar	Hunsur Krishnamurthy	solo
1979	Adalu Badalu	"Nalidide Jeevana Ganga"	Vijaya Bhaskar	Vijaya Narasimha	S. P. Balasubrahmanyam
1979	Adalu Badalu	"Baa Sukhava Paade"	Vijaya Bhaskar	Chi. Udaya Shankar	solo
1979	Oorvasi Neene Nanna Preyasi	"Iniya Saniye"	Ilaiyaraaja	N/A	S. P. Balasubrahmanyam
1979	Oorvasi Neene Nanna Preyasi	"Masthana"	Ilaiyaraaja	N/A	Anand, S. P. Sailaja, S. P. Balasubrahmanyam
1979	Oorvasi Neene Nanna Preyasi	"Yaako Yeno"	Ilaiyaraaja	N/A	solo
1979	Oorvasi Neene Nanna Preyasi	"Innendendu"	Ilaiyaraaja	N/A	solo
1979	Oorvasi Neene Nanna Preyasi	"Bayasave"	Ilaiyaraaja	N/A	solo
1979	Bhoolokadalli Yamaraja	"Endu Kaanada Belaka Kande"	C. Ashwath	Doddarange Gowda	S. P. Balasubrahmanyam
1979	Bhoolokadalli Yamaraja	"Ninna Myaage"	C. Ashwath	Doddarange Gowda	S. Janaki, S. P. Balasubrahmanyam

=== 1980s ===
==== 1980 ====
Film	Song	Composer(s)	Writer(s)	Co-artist(s)
Bangarada Jinke	"Olume Siriya Kandu"	Vijaya Bhaskar	Doddarange Gowda	S. P. Balasubrahmanyam
Bangarada Jinke	"Kenakiruve"	Vijaya Bhaskar	Doddarange Gowda	solo
Bangarada Jinke	"Sangaathiyu Bali Baarade"	Vijaya Bhaskar	Doddarange Gowda	solo
Driver Hanumanthu	"Paapa Muddu Paapa"	Vijaya Bhaskar	Doddarange Gowda	Mohan
Hanthakana Sanchu	"Aasegala"	Vijaya Bhaskar	R. N. Jayagopal	Kasturi Shankar, Vishnuvardhan
Hanthakana Sanchu	"Jeevana Sanjeevana"	Vijaya Bhaskar	Kuvempu	Jayachandran
Jari Bidda Jana	"Halliya Thotadi"	T. G. Lingappa	Chi. Udaya Shankar	S. P. Balasubrahmanyam
Jari Bidda Jana	"Nanage Nanade Nyaya"	T. G. Lingappa	Chi. Udaya Shankar	solo
Kaalinga	"Thayi Thande Ibbaru"	C. Satyam	Chi. Udaya Shankar	S. Janaki
Manjina There	"Balasiruve"	Upendra Kumar	Chi. Udaya Shankar	K. J. Yesudas
Makkala Saninya	"Gowri Manohari"	M. S. Viswanathan	R. N. Jayagopal	solo
Maria My Darling	"Na Nindhu"	Shankar–Ganesh	Chi. Udaya Shankar	S. P. Balasubrahmanyam
Minchina Ota	"Heege Nee Naguthiruvaaga"	Prabhakar Badri	Rudramurthy Shastry	S. P. Balasubrahmanyam
Minchina Ota	"Arasutha Sukhavanu"	Prabhakar Badri	Rudramurthy Shastry	solo
Ondu Hennu Aaru Kannu	"Hadinaru Endare"	S. Rajeswara Rao	Chi. Udaya Shankar	solo

==== 1981 ====
Film	Song	Composer(s)	Writer(s)	Co-artist(s)
Bhoomige Banda Bhagavantha	"Bhoomige Banda"	G. K. Venkatesh	Chi. Udaya Shankar	S. P. Balasubrahmanyam
Bhoomige Banda Bhagavantha	"Kasturi Thilakavu"	G. K. Venkatesh	Chi. Udaya Shankar	solo
Bhoomige Banda Bhagavantha	"Nagauvenu"	G. K. Venkatesh	Chi. Udaya Shankar	S. Janaki
Bhoomige Banda Bhagavantha	"Baara"	G. K. Venkatesh	Chi. Udaya Shankar	solo
Garjane	"Nanna Roopa"	Ilaiyaraaja	Sreekumaran Thampi	solo
Keralinda Simha	"Eno Moha Eko Daaha"	C. Satyam	Chi. Udaya Shankar	Rajkumar
Maha Prachandaru	"Baayalli Neerooride"	Upendra Kumar	N/A	S. P. Balasubrahmanyam
Naga Kala Bhairava	"Chimmithu"	M. Ranga Rao	Vijaya Narasimha	S. P. Balasubrahmanyam

==== 1982 ====
Film	Song	Composer(s)	Writer(s)	Co-artist(s)
Baadada Hoo	"Prema Nouke"	L. Vaidyanathan	Chi. Udaya Shankar	solo
Hasyaratna Ramakrishna	"Chikkavanene Ivanu"	T. G. Lingappa	Chi. Udaya Shankar	K. J. Yesudas
Hosa Belaku	"Theredide Mane"	M. Ranga Rao	Kuvempu	S. Janaki
Jimmy Gallu	"Haadu Yaava Haadu"	Vijaya Bhaskar	Chi. Udaya Shankar	S. P. Balasubrahmanyam
Jimmy Gallu	"Vayyari Mogava Nodu"	Vijaya Bhaskar	Chi. Udaya Shankar	S. P. Balasubrahmanyam
Jimmy Gallu	"Deva Mandiradalli"	Vijaya Bhaskar	Chi. Udaya Shankar	S. P. Balasubrahmanyam
Jimmy Gallu	"Nanna Janumave"	Vijaya Bhaskar	Chi. Udaya Shankar	P. B. Sreenivas
Manasa Sarovara	"Manasa Sarovara"	Vijaya Bhaskar	Vijaya Narasimha	S. P. Balasubrahmanyam
Manasa Sarovara	"Haadu Haadu"	Vijaya Bhaskar	G. S. Shivarudrappa	solo
Suvarna Sethuve	"Ninna Konku Notava"	Vijaya Bhaskar	Geethapriya	S. P. Balasubrahmanyam
Suvarna Sethuve	"Savira Hoogalali"	Vijaya Bhaskar	Geethapriya	P. Jayachandran
Suvarna Sethuve	"Malnadin Moolenaage"	Vijaya Bhaskar	Doddarange Gowda	solo

==== 1983 ====
Film	Song	Composer(s)	Writer(s)	Co-artist(s)
Aasha	"Love Me Yenuva Vayasu"	G. K. Venkatesh	Geethapriya	P. Jayachandran
Aasha	"Muttho Mutthu"	G. K. Venkatesh	R. N. Jayagopal	Rajkumar Bharathi
Aasha	"Nanda Deepa"	G. K. Venkatesh	R. N. Jayagopal	S. P. Balasubrahmanyam
Ananda Bhairavi	"Haaduva Muraliya"	Ramesh Naidu	N/A	S. P. Balasubrahmanyam
Ananda Sagara	"Premada Sarigamake"	S. P. Balasubrahmanyam	R. N. Jayagopal	S. P. Balasubrahmanyam
Avala Neralu	"Kaaveri Theerada Mele"	Joy Raja	R. N. Jayagopal	S. P. Balasubrahmanyam
Avala Neralu	"Sneha Premaroopa"	Joy Raja	Vijaya Narasimha	solo
Banker Margayya	"Naatya Gaana Manaranjane"	Vijaya Bhaskar	Vijaya Narasimha	solo
Banker Margayya	"Balu Mojina Ee Youvana"	Vijaya Bhaskar		solo
Benkiyalli Aralida Hoovu	"Benkiyalli Aralida Hoovu"	M. S. Viswanathan	Chi. Udaya Shankar	solo
Benkiyalli Aralida Hoovu	"Premada Geetheye"	M. S. Viswanathan	Chi. Udaya Shankar	solo
Bhakta Prahlada	"Laali Laali Sukumara"	T. G. Lingappa	Chi. Udaya Shankar	Rajkumar
Dharani Mandala Madhyadolage	"Kanasanu Beesi Olavina Baleyanu"	Vijaya Bhaskar	Siddalingaiah	solo
Dharani Mandala Madhyadolage	"Uyyale Aadona Banniro	Vijaya Bhaskar	P. Jayachandran	
Eradu Nakshatragalu	"Eke Malli Hange"	G. K. Venkatesh	Chi. Udaya Shankar	Rajkumar
Eradu Nakshatragalu	"Howdu Endare"	G. K. Venkatesh	Chi. Udaya Shankar	Rajkumar, Master Lohith
Gandugali Rama	"Vaiyyari Nee Heege"	C. Satyam	Chi. Udaya Shankar	Vishnuvardhan
Gandugali Rama	"Ammamma Ninnannu"	C. Satyam	Chi. Udaya Shankar	S. P. Balasubrahmanyam
Kaamana Billu	"Kannu Kannu Kalethaga"	Upendra Kumar	Chi. Udaya Shankar	Rajkumar
Kaamana Billu	"Indu Ananda Naa Thalalare"	Upendra Kumar	Chi. Udaya Shankar	Rajkumar
Kalluveebe Nudiyithu	"Hennu Kannina"	M. Ranga Rao	R. N. Jayagopal	Vishnuvardhan
Kalluveebe Nudiyithu	"Olavina Jodi"	M. Ranga Rao	Vijaya Narasimha	Vishnuvardhan
Kalluveebe Nudiyithu	"Nanna Devana Veena Vaadana"	M. Ranga Rao	Vijaya Narasimha	solo
Karune Illada Kanoonu	"Hareyada Cheluva Hoove"	Shankar–Ganesh	R. N. Jayagopal	S. P. Balasubrahmanyam
Karune Illada Kanoonu	"Neenu Thandantha Raaga"	Shankar–Ganesh	R. N. Jayagopal	solo
Karune Illada Kanoonu	"Beladingala Holeyali"	Shankar–Ganesh	S. U. Rudramurthy Shastry	solo
Kaviratna Kalidasa	"O Priyathama"	M. Ranga Rao	Chi. Udaya Shankar	Rajkumar
Kaviratna Kalidasa	"Sadaa Kannale"	M. Ranga Rao	Chi. Udaya Shankar	Rajkumar
Kranthiyogi Basavanna	"Ba Yemballi Yenna"	M. Ranga Rao	Shri Basaveshwara	solo
Kranthiyogi Basavanna	"Suryanudaya Tavarege"	M. Ranga Rao	Shri Basaveshwara	solo
Kranthiyogi Basavanna	"Odhagite Namagintha Bhagya"	M. Ranga Rao	Maate Mahadevi	P. B. Sreenivas
Samarpane	"Manada Manada"	M. Ranga Rao	Vijaya Narasimha	S. P. Balasubrahmanyam
Samarpane	"Ee Baalinalli"	M. Ranga Rao	Vijaya Narasimha	S. P. Balasubrahmanyam
Samarpane	"Shubha Yoga Koodide"	M. Ranga Rao	Doddarange Gowda	S. P. Balasubrahmanyam
Sididedda Sahodara	"Hareyavu Karedide"	C. Satyam	R. N. Jayagopal	S. Janaki, S. P. Balasubrahmanyam

==== 1984 ====
Film	Song	Composer(s)	Writer(s)	Co-artist(s)
Anubhava	"Kaamana Dumbiya"	L. Vaidyanathan	V. Manohar	S. P. Balasubrahmanyam
Anubhava	"Hodeya Doora"	L. Vaidyanathan	V. Manohar	solo
Benki Birugali	"Urvashige Vayassaytu"	M. Ranga Rao	Chi. Udayashankar	solo
Benki Birugali	"Helalarenu"	M. Ranga Rao	Doddarange Gowda	K. J. Yesudas
Huli Hejje	"Hoovu Mullu"	Vijaya Bhaskar	R. N. Jayagopal	S. P. Balasubrahmanyam
Huli Hejje	"Ahamevaasmi"	Vijaya Bhaskar	P. B. Sreenivas	P. B. Sreenivas
Indina Ramayana	"Nalleya Savimatha"	Vijayanand	Chi. Udaya Shankar	S. P. Balasubrahmanyam
Makkaliravva Mane Thumba	"Nanna Chinna"	G. K. Venkatesh	Purandara Dasa and Doddarange Gowda	solo
Rudranaga	"Cheluveya Kandu"	M. Ranga Rao	Shyama Sundara Kulakarni	S. P. Balasubrahmanyam
Rudranaga	"Hoovinantha Manasone"	M. Ranga Rao	R. N. Jayagopal	S. P. Balasubrahmanyam
Shravana Banthu	"Ide Raagadalli"	M. Ranga Rao	Chi. Udaya Shankar	Rajkumar
Shravana Banthu	"Shravana Maasa Bandaaga"	M. Ranga Rao		Rajkumar
Shravana Banthu	"Baanina Anchinda Bande"	M. Ranga Rao		Rajkumar

==== 1985 ====
Film	Song	Composer(s)	Writer(s)	Co-artist(s)
Ade Kannu	"Ide Nota Ide Aata"	G. K. Venkatesh	Chi. Udaya Shankar	Rajkumar
Dhruva Thare	"Aa Moda Banalli"	Upendra Kumar	Chi. Upendra Kumar	Raj Kumar, Bangalore Latha
Dhruva Thare	"O Nalle Savinudiya"	Upendra Kumar	Chi. Upendra Kumar	Raj Kumar
Jeevana Chakra	"Olleya Vayaside"	Rajan–Nagendra	Chi. Udaya Shankar	S. P. Balasubrahmanyam, S. Janaki
Masanada Hoovu	"Kannada Nadina Karavali"	Vijaya Bhaskar	N/A	P. Jayachandran
Masanada Hoovu	"Uppina Sagaraku"	Vijaya Bhaskar	N/A	P. Jayachandran
Mugila Mallige	"Saaku Saaku Hoge"	V. S. Narasimhan	R. N. Jayagopal	P. Susheela
Mugila Mallige	"Nimageedina Naa Hakuve"	V. S. Narasimhan	R. N. Jayagopal	Jayachandran
Naanu Nanna Hendthi	"Rathri Aytu Malagona"	Shankar–Ganesh	Hamsalekha	Ramesh
Naanu Nanna Hendthi	"Akkipete Lakkamma"	Shankar–Ganesh	Hamsalekha	S. P. Balasubrahmanyam
Nee Thanda Kanike	"Eno Ondu Hosa Jeevavu"	Vijayanand	R. N. Jayagopal	S. P. Balasubrahmanyam
Swabhimana	"Haalu Jenu Serida Hange"	Shankar–Ganesh	R. N. Jayagopal	solo

==== 1986 ====
Film	Song	Composer(s)	Writer(s)	Co-artist(s)
Anuraga Aralithu	"Beesadiru Thangaali"	Upendra Kumar	Chi. Udaya Shankar	solo
Bhagyada Lakshmi Baramma	"Yenu Mayavo Yenu Marmavo"	Singeetham Srinivasa Rao	Chi. Udaya Shankar	Rajkumar
Bhagyada Lakshmi Baramma	"Ananda Ananda"	Singeetham Srinivasa Rao	Chi. Udaya Shankar	Rajkumar, Chi. Dattaraj
Mrugaalaya	"Maagiya Kaala"	Rajan–Nagendra	Chi. Udaya Shankar	solo
Mrugaalaya	"Kudire Savaariya"	Rajan–Nagendra	Chi. Udaya Shankar	S. P. Balasubrahmanyam
Sundara Swapnagalu	"Hrudayavu Swara Haadide"	Vijaya Bhaskar	R. N. Jayagopal	P. Susheela
Sundara Swapnagalu	"Hege Helali"	Vijaya Bhaskar	R. N. Jayagopal	K. J. Yesudas

==== 1987 ====
Film	Song	Composer(s)	Writer(s)	Co-artist(s)
Elu Suttina Kote	"Ee Shrusti"	L. Vaidyanathan	N/A	S. P. Balasubrahmanyam
Hrudaya Pallavi	"Akashadinda Banda"	M. Ranga Rao	R. N. Jayagopal	S. P. Balasubrahmanyam
Hrudaya Pallavi	"Raagake Swaravagi"	M. Ranga Rao	R. N. Jayagopal	S. P. Balasubrahmanyam
Hrudaya Pallavi	"Hrudaya Thambi"	M. Ranga Rao	R. N. Jayagopal	solo
Huli Hebbuli	"Mutthu Bedide"	Vijaya Bhaskar	Chi. Udaya Shankar	S. P. Balasubrahmanyam
Jayasimha	"Bigumaana"	Vijayanand	Chi. Udaya Shankar	S. P. Balasubrahmanyam
Manasa Veene	"Veene Nanna Manasa Veene"	M. Ranga Rao	Geethapriya	K. J. Yesudas
Manasa Veene	"Tha Huttida Kanninalli"	M. Ranga Rao	P. Ramamurthy	solo
Olavina Udugore	"Hrudaya Miditha"	M. Ranga Rao	Shyamasundara Kulkarni	S. P. Balasubrahmanyam
Premaloka	"Bathroominalli"	Hamsalekha	Hamsalekha	solo
Shruthi Seridaaga	"Bombeyatavayya"	T. G. Lingappa	Chi. Udaya Shankar	Rajkumar
Shruthi Seridaaga	"Raaga Jeevana Raaga"	T. G. Lingappa	Chi. Udaya Shankar	Rajkumar
Sowbhagya Lakshmi	"Baalalli Jyothiyu" (duet)	S. P. Balasubrahmanyam	Chi. Udayashankar	S. P. Sailaja
Sowbhagya Lakshmi	"Baalalli Jyothiyu" (solo)	S. P. Balasubrahmanyam	Chi. Udayashankar	solo
Sowbhagya Lakshmi	"Priya Priya Vinodave"	S. P. Balasubrahmanyam	Chi. Udayashankar	S. P. Balasubrahmanyam
Sowbhagya Lakshmi	"Innellu Neenu Hogalaare"	S. P. Balasubrahmanyam	Chi. Udayashankar	S. P. Balasubrahmanyam
Vijay	"Premigalanu"	M. Ranga Rao		S. P. Balasubrahmanyam
Vijay	"Aadthira Haadthira"	M. Ranga Rao		solo
Sampradaya	"Prema Madhurakshara"	P. Vajrappa	Kanagal Prabhakar Shastry	
Sampradaya	"Aadona Aata Aadona"	P. Vajrappa	Kanagal Prabhakar Shastry	S. P. Balasubrahmanyam

==== 1988 ====
Film	Song	Composer(s)	Writer(s)	Co-artist(s)
Avale Nanna Hendthi	"Neenu Hatthiravididdare"	Hamsalekha	Hamsalekha	S. P. Balasubrahmanyam
Avale Nanna Hendthi	"Hey Hudugi"	Hamsalekha	Hamsalekha	S. P. Balasubrahmanyam
Balondu Bhavageethe	"Beeso Gaali"	Hamsalekha	Chi. Udaya Shankar	Malaysia Vasudevan
Devatha Manushya	"Ee Sogasaada Sanje"	Upendra Kumar	Chi. Udaya Shankar	Rajkumar
Daada	"Hasivayasina"	Vijayanand	R. N. Jayagopal	S. P. Balasubrahmanyam
Daada	"Nanna Cheluvane Rasikane"	Vijayanand	R. N. Jayagopal	S. P. Balasubrahmanyam
Daada	"Ee Yauvvana"	Vijayanand	Chi. Udaya Shankar	S. P. Balasubrahmanyam
Dharmathma	"Hrudaya Veeneyu Meetide"	Rajan–Nagendra	Chi. Udaya Shankar	S. P. Balasubrahmanyam
Dharmathma	"Hosadada Haadondanu Naa Haaduve"	Rajan–Nagendra	Chi. Udaya Shankar	S. P. Balasubrahmanyam
Krishna Mechchida Radhe	"Krishna Bega Baro"	Shankar–Ganesh	N/A	solo
Krishna Mechchida Radhe	"Nodi Naguthide"	Shankar–Ganesh	N/A	solo
Krishna Rukmini	"Naa Kande Ninna Madhura"	K. V. Mahadevan	N/A	S. P. Balasubrahmanyam
Krishna Rukmini	"Balukaado Banga"	K. V. Mahadevan	N/A	S. P. Balasubrahmanyam
Krishna Rukmini	Cheluvina Chilume"	K. V. Mahadevan	N/A	S. P. Balasubrahmanyam
Krishna Rukmini	"Naada Loka Shri Krishna"	K. V. Mahadevan	N/A	solo
Olavina Aasare	"Kanasali Manasali"	M. Ranga Rao	Doddarange Gowda	S. P. Balasubrahmanyam
Olavina Aasare	"Baa Raja Baa"	M. Ranga Rao	Doddarange Gowda	solo
Olavina Aasare	"Swapna Soudha"	M. Ranga Rao	Doddarange Gowda	solo
Olavina Aasare	"Sahasa Simhanu Bandanu"	M. Ranga Rao	Doddarange Gowda	solo
Ramanna Shamanna	"Adhara Adhara Kalethaga"	S. P. Balasubrahmanyam	Chi. Udaya Shankar	S. P. Balasubrahmanyam
Ramanna Shamanna	"Cheluve Olave"	S. P. Balasubrahmanyam	Chi. Udaya Shankar	S. P. Balasubrahmanyam
Ranadheera	"Baaramma" (bit.)	Hamsalekha	Hamsalekha	chorus
Ranadheera	"Ee Preethige" (bit.)	Hamsalekha	Hamsalekha	solo
Ranadheera	"En Hudgiro Adyaaking Aadtiro	Hamsalekha	Hamsalekha	Master Manjunath, S. P. Balasubrahmanyam
Ranaranga	"Ninna Kannugalu"	Hamsalekha	Hamsalekha	S. P. Balasubrahmanyam
Ranaranga	"Iva Yaava Seeme"	Hamsalekha	Hamsalekha	S. P. Balasubrahmanyam
Samyuktha	"Preethiyo Premavo Mohavo"	Singeetham Srinivasa Rao	Chi. Udaya Shankar	S. P. Balasubrahmanyam
Shanti Nivasa	"Jubilee Silver Jubilee"	M. Ranga Rao	R. N. Jayagopal	S. P. Balasubrahmanyam
Shanti Nivasa	"Mysoorininda Kai Hididu Banda"	M. Ranga Rao	R. N. Jayagopal	S. P. Balasubrahmanyam
Shanti Nivasa	"Masaala Paan Masaala"	M. Ranga Rao	R. N. Jayagopal	S. P. Balasubrahmanyam

==== 1989 ====
Film	Song	Composer(s)	Writer(s)	Co-artist(s)
Avatara Purusha	"Kulukutha Balakuve"	Vijayanand		S. P. Balasubrahmanyam
Avatara Purusha	"Saagarake Chandramana"	Vijayanand		S. P. Balasubrahmanyam
Gandandre Gandu	"Ba Ba Ba Hejje Haaku"	G. K. Venkatesh	R. N. Jayagopal	S. P. Balasubrahmanyam
Gandandre Gandu	"Ee Premada Hosa"	G. K. Venkatesh	R. N. Jayagopal	S. P. Balasubrahmanyam
Jai Karnataka	"I Love You"	Vijayanand	N/A	S. P. Balasubrahmanyam
Poli Huduga	"Jokumarane"	Hamsalekha	Hamsalekha	S. P. Balasubrahmanyam
Poli Huduga	"Aa Suryana Sutthodu"	Hamsalekha	Hamsalekha	S. P. Balasubrahmanyam
Yuddha Kaanda	"Nooraroorugalalli"	Hamsalekha	Hamsalekha	solo
Yuddha Kaanda	"Kempu Thotadalli"	Hamsalekha	Hamsalekha	S. P. Balasubrahmanyam, B. R. Chaya

=== 1990-present ===
Year	Film	Song	Composer(s)	Writer(s)	Co-artist(s)
1991	Iduve Jeevana	"Ee Lifeye Ondu"	Vijaya Bhaskar	N/A	solo
1991	Iduve Jeevana	"Appane Samaritan"	Vijaya Bhaskar	N/A	S. P. Balasubrahmanyam
1991	Girimallile	"Vanasiri Ganasiri"	M. Ranga Rao	N/A	solo
1991	Keralinda Kesari	"Ramonchana"	Sangeetha Raja		solo
1991	Keralinda Kesari	"Mucchitta Maatha"	Sangeetha Raja		S. P. Balasubrahmanyam
1991	Keralinda Kesari	"Thengina Thotdaage"	Sangeetha Raja		S. P. Balasubrahmanyam
1992	Ganesha Subramanya	"Hareya Baayaride"	V. Manohar	V. Manohar, K. S. Narasimha Swamy and B. Rudramurthy Shastri	solo
1992	Ganesha Subramanya	"O Kusuma Baale"	V. Manohar	V. Manohar, K. S. Narasimha Swamy and B. Rudramurthy Shastri	solo
1992	Mana Gedda Maga	"Ninna Preethi Prema Gaana"	L. Vaidyanathan	Vijaya Narasimha	K. J. Yesudas
1992	Prajegalu Prabhugalu	"Madanannga Baa Mohana"	Manoranjan Prabhakar	N/A	Rajkumar Bharathi
1992	Undu Hoda Kondu Hoda	"Undu Hoda Kondu Hoda"	Vijaya Bhaskar	Nagathihalli Chandrashekar	solo
1992	Undu Hoda Kondu Hoda	"Nakka Haage Natisabeda"	Vijaya Bhaskar	K. S. Narasimhaswamy	Rajkumar Bharathi
1994	Beladingala Baale	"Gopala Kelo"	Guna Singh	Shamasundara Kulkarni	S. P. Balasubrahmanyam
1994	Beladingala Baale	"Baraseleda Olave"	Guna Singh	Doddarange Gowda	S. P. Balasubrahmanyam
1994	Keralida Sarpa	"Hrudaya Meetidaga"	Sangeetha Raja	N/A	S. P. Balasubrahmanyam
1994	Keralida Sarpa	"Nagu Nathuga Aaduva"	Sangeetha Raja	N/A	S. P. Balasubrahmanyam
1994	Keralida Sarpa	"Asenota Koodi"	Sangeetha Raja	N/A	S. P. Balasubrahmanyam
1995	Beladingala Baale	"Gopala Kelo"	Guna Singh	Shamasundara Kulkarni	S. P. Balasubrahmanyam
1995	Beladingala Baale	"Baraseleda Olave"	Guna Singh	Doddarange Gowda	S. P. Balasubrahmanyam
2001	Neela	"Aa Meru Ee Meru"	Vijaya Bhaskar	Kotiganahalli Ramaiah	Rajesh Krishnan
2001	Neela	"Dho Dho Surimaleyanu"	Vijaya Bhaskar	Kotiganahalli Ramaiah	M. D. Pallavi Arun, L. N. Sastri
2001	Neela	"Kannannu Muchchabahudu"	Vijaya Bhaskar	Lakshmipathy Kolar	solo
2001	Neela	"Kotta Daniya Kottanthe"	Vijaya Bhaskar	Lakshmipathy Kolar	solo
2001	Neela	"Yedeyaaga Yekathiri	Vijaya Bhaskar	Lakshmipathy Kolar	Hemanth Kumar
