= Samarpane =

- Directed by: H. R. Bhargava
- Written by: Navarathnaram
- Screenplay by: H. R. Bhargava
- Story by: Usha Navarathnaram
- Produced by: P. Krishnaraj
- Starring: Aarathi; Rajeev; Jai Jagadish
- Cinematography: R. Madhusudan
- Edited by: Yadav Victor
- Music by: M. Ranga Rao
- Production company: Mohan Murali Productions
- Distributed by: Mohan Murali Productions
- Release date: 9 November 1983
- Running time: 144 min
- Country: India
- Language: Kannada

Samarpane is a 1983 Indian Kannada-language film based on the novel of the same name by Usha Navratnaram, directed by H. R. Bhargava and produced by P. Krishnaraj. The film stars Aarathi in the main role of the female protagonist Sarla opposite Rajeev and Jai Jagadish. The film has musical score by M. Ranga Rao. Aarathi who had previously starred in two movies based on Usha Navratnaram's novels (Hombisilu and Preetisi Nodu) was signed for the role. Ramakrishna who was to play the antagonist was replaced by Jai Jagdish since Ramakrishna had played the role of Aarathi's son (Ranganayaki) only a couple of years earlier and the director felt that the audience may not accept the pairing.

== Cast ==
- Aarathi
- Rajeev
- Jai Jagadish
- Charan Raj
- K. S. Ashwath
- Leelavathi
- Musuri Krishnamurthy
- Pramila Joshai
- Ashalatha
- Kaminidharan
- Lokanath in Guest Appearance
- Uma Shivakumar in Guest Appearance
- Shivaram in Guest Appearance
- Baby Rekha
- Baby Suma

== Soundtrack ==
The music was composed by M. Ranga Rao.

No.	Song	Singers	Lyrics	Length (m:ss)
1	"Manada Manada"	S. P. Balasubrahmanyam, Vani Jairam	Vijaya Narasimha	04:38
2	"Ee Baalinalli"	S. P. Balasubrahmanyam, Vani Jairam	Vijaya Narasimha	04:02
3	"Shubha Yoga Koodide"	S. P. Balasubrahmanyam, Vani Jairam	Doddarange Gowda	04:20
4	"Premada Sukha"	S. P. Balasubrahmanyam	Shyamasundara Kulkarni	04:08
