= Aparadhi (1976 film) =

- Directed by: Y. R. Swamy
- Written by: Om Shakthi Creations
- Screenplay by: Y. R. Swamy
- Produced by: S. Heerabai
- Starring: Srinath; Aarathi; Balakrishna; Narasimharaju
- Cinematography: R. Madhusudan
- Edited by: P. Bhakthavathsalam
- Music by: Satyam
- Production company: Om Shakthi Creations
- Distributed by: Om Shakthi Creations
- Release date: 9 December 1976
- Country: India
- Language: Kannada

Aparadhi is a 1976 Indian Kannada-language film, directed by Y. R. Swamy and produced by S. Heerabai. The film stars Srinath, Aarathi, Balakrishna and Narasimharaju. The film has musical score by Satyam. This film was the 500th Kannada film to be released.

== Cast ==
- Srinath
- Aarathi
- Balakrishna
- Narasimharaju
- Thoogudeepa Srinivas
- Prabhakar
- Jr. Shetty
- N. S. Rao
- Sharapanjara Iyanger
- Thyagaraja Urs
- Srinivasa Murthy
- A. Padmanabha Rao
- Kannada Raju
- Sunitha
- Mamatha Shenoy
- M. Jayashree
- Shanthi
- Vajramuni in Guest Appearance
- Lokanath in Guest Appearance

== Soundtrack ==
The music was composed by Satyam.

No.	Song	Singers	Lyrics	Length (m:ss)
1	"Naguva Ninna Mogava Chenna"	S. P. Balasubrahmanyam, P. Susheela	Chi. Udayashankar	04:24
2	"Oh Yummy Baar Ammi"	S. P. Balasubrahmanyam, P. Susheela	Vijaya Naarasimha	03:21
