= Paduvaaralli Pandavaru =

- poster
- Directed by: Puttanna Kanagal
- Written by: Rao Bahaddur
- Screenplay by: Puttanna Kanagal
- Produced by: Puttanna Kanagal
- Starring: Ambareesh; Ramakrishna; Jai Jagadish
- Cinematography: S. Maruthi Rao
- Edited by: V. P. Krishna
- Music by: Vijaya Bhaskar
- Distributed by: Kanagal Creations
- Release date: 1978
- Running time: 146 minutes
- Country: India
- Language: Kannada

Paduvaaralli Pandavaru is a 1978 Indian Kannada language film directed by Puttanna Kanagal. It stars Ambareesh, Ramakrishna and Jai Jagadish as the protagonists and Aarathi makes an extended special appearance in the role of a journalist. The movie was an adaptation of the epic Mahabharata. Fit into a rural scenario, the film references some of the clashes between the Pandavas and the Kauravas.

The film was remade in Telugu as Manavoori Pandavulu (1978) by Bapu, who later directed the Hindi remake Hum Paanch (1981) and in Tamil as Pannai Purathu Pandavargal (1982). Critics have called the 2018 Telugu movie Rangasthalam as an updated version of Mana Voori Pandavulu which was the Telugu remake of this movie.

== Premise ==
The movie is an adaptation of the epic Mahabharata, fit into a rural scenario. It highlights the clash between a village zamindar and five young men, some of them similar to the conflicts between the Pandavas and the Kauravas. Pandavaru refers to the five men.It also is a commentary on rigid feudal system and eventual opposition to that from our heroes.

== Cast ==
- Ambareesh as Kariya
- Ramakrishna as Shankar
- Jai Jagadish as Ramanna
- Aarathi (Special Appearance)
- Shubha (Special Appearance)
- Dheerendra Gopal as Sangappa
- Musuri Krishnamurthy as "Connection" Kalappa
- G. V. Krishna
- Srilalitha
- Shanthala
- Vishwanath
- Mala
- Mysore Lokesh
- M. Jayashree
- Mahadev
- Chandrahasa Alva

== Soundtrack ==
The music of the film was composed by Vijaya Bhaskar.

Title	Singer(s)
"Thukadisi Thukadisi Beeladhiru Thamma"	P. B. Sreenivas
"Janma Needidha, Bhuthaayiya"	S. P. Balasubrahmanyam
"Saavira Saavira Yuga"	S. P. Balasubrahmanyam
"Kannmuchi Kulithare"	S. P. Balasubrahmanyam
"Haadomme Haadabeku"	P. B. Sreenivas, S. P. Balasubrahmanyam
"Esu Varsa Aayithe Ninge"	S. P. Balasubrahmanyam, Kasturi Shankar
"Sri Rama Bandhavne"	Kasturi Shankar
"Bahishkaara Bahishkaara"	S. P. Balasubrahmanyam

== Reception ==
The Hindu listed this film alongside five other films for which Ambareesh earned critical acclaim for his acting.
