= 27th Filmfare Awards South =

Award ceremony for South Indian films

- Date: July 6, 1980
- Site: Chennai

The 27th Filmfare Awards South ceremony honoring the winners of the best of South Indian cinema in 1979 washeld on July 6, 1980, at Music Academy Madras.

The president of this year's function was Supreme Court judge P. N. Bhagwati. The chief guest of the evening was L. V. Prasad.

== Awards ==
=== Kannada cinema ===
Best Film	Best Director
Dharmasere - Aarathi	Puttanna Kanagal - Dharmasere
Best Actor	Best Actress
Anant Nag - Naa Ninna Bidalaare	Aarathi - Dharmasere

=== Malayalam cinema ===
Best Film	Best Director
Thakara - V. V. Babu	Bharathan - Thakara
Best Actor	Best Actress
Prathap K. Pothan - Thakara	Srividya - Edavazhiyile Poocha Minda Poocha

=== Tamil cinema ===
Best Film	Best Director
Pasi - Durai	Mahendran - Uthiri Pookkal
Best Actor	Best Actress
Sivakumar - Rosapoo Ravikaikari	Shoba - Pasi

=== Telugu cinema ===
Best Film	Best Director
Gorintaku - K. Murari	Dasari Narayana Rao - Gorintaku
Best Actor	Best Actress
Sobhan Babu - Karthika Deepam	Sujatha - Guppedu Manasu

== Awards Presentation ==
- Aarathi (Best Film Kannada) Received Award from Amol Palekar
- V. V. Babu (Best Film Malayalam) Received Award from Moushumi Chatterjee
- K. Murari (Best Film Telugu) Received Award from Sheela
- Durai (Best Film Tamil) Received Award from Jayasudha
- Puttanna Kanagal (Best Director Kannada) Received Award from Vidhubala
- Bharathan (Best Director Malayalam) Received Award from Jayachithra
- Dasari Narayana Rao (Best Director Telugu) Received Award from Jeetendra
- Mahendran (Best Director Tamil) Received Award from Latha
- Aarathi (Best Actress Kannada) Received Award from Shashi Kapoor
- Srividya (Best Actress Malayalam) Received Award from Kamal Haasan
- Sujatha (Best Actress Telugu) Received Award from Jayalalithaa
- Prema Menon Receives her daughter Shoba's Award (Best Actress Tamil) from Sowcar Janaki
- Amol Palekar Receives Anant Nag Award (Best Actor Kannada) from Deepa
- Prathap K. Pothan (Best Actor Malayalam) Received Award from Rekha
- Sobhan Babu (Best Actor Telugu) Received Award from Rati Agnihotri
- Sivakumar (Best Actor Tamil) Received Award from K. R. Vijaya
