= Bili Hendthi =

1975 film

- Directed by: Puttanna Kanagal
- Written by: M. N. Murthy
- Produced by: Muddukrishna; Jayasimha; Maruthi
- Starring: Aarathi; Leelavathi; Loknath; Margaret Thomsen
- Cinematography: B. N. Haridas
- Edited by: V. P. Krishnan
- Music by: Vijaya Bhaskar
- Production company: Premier Studios
- Distributed by: M. J. M. Productions
- Release date: 1975
- Country: India
- Language: Kannada

Bili Hendthi ( transl. White Wife) is a 1975 Indian Kannada film, directed by Puttanna Kanagal, starring Aarathi, Loknath and Margaret Thomsen.

== Plot ==
Sharada (Aarathi), who is engaged to a man studying abroad, shares a close bond with her future in-laws. However, when her fiancé returns, she discovers that he has married Elisa, a "white woman", and is no longer interested in her. Embracing the role of a selfless good Samaritan, seemingly the antithesis of a jilted lover, Sharada befriends Elisa. Meanwhile, Elisa wins over Sharada's family with her agreeable nature and willingness to integrate into Indian society.However, Elisa eventually learns that her husband has betrayed Sharada's love.

== Cast ==
- Aarathi as Sharada
- Lokanath as Sharada's father
- Leelavathi as Gopinath's mother
- Margaret Thomsen as Elisa/Lalitha
- Anil Kumar as Gopinath
- Uma Shivakumar as Sharada's mother
- Seetharam as Gopinath's father

== Soundtrack ==
The music of the film was composed by Vijaya Bhaskar, with lyrics penned by Vijaya Narasimha.

Bili Hendthi

Soundtrack album by Vijaya Bhaskar
- Released: 1975
- Genre: Feature film soundtrack

Track #	Song	Singer(s)	Duration
1	"Aa Devare Nudida"	Vani Jairam	
2	"Rangena Halliyage"	Vani Jairam, Kasturi Shankar	
3	"Happiest Moments"	Vani Jairam	
4	"Yaava Thayiyu"	Kasturi Shankar	
5	"Rangena Halliyage"(Solo)	Vani Jairam	
