= Nentaro Gantu Kallaro =

- Directed by: A. V. Sheshagiri Rao
- Written by: T. V. Panchakshari (dialogues)
- Screenplay by: A. V. Sheshagiri Rao
- Story by: A. Shashirekha
- Produced by: G. N. Lakshmipathy
- Starring: Vishnuvardhan; Aarathi; K. S. Ashwath; Balakrishna
- Cinematography: S. S. Lal
- Edited by: T. V. Panchakshari
- Music by: G. K. Venkatesh
- Production company: Savan Movies
- Distributed by: Savan Movies
- Release date: 15 September 1979
- Running time: 113 min
- Country: India
- Language: Kannada

Nentaro Gantu Kallaro is a 1979 Indian Kannada film, directed by A. V. Sheshagiri Rao and produced by G. N. Lakshmipathy. The film stars Vishnuvardhan, Aarathi, K. S. Ashwath and Balakrishna in lead roles. The film had musical score by G. K. Venkatesh.

== Cast ==
- Vishnuvardhan
- Aarathi
- K. S. Ashwath
- Balakrishna
- Dinesh
- Musuri Krishnamurthy
- Sundar Krishna Urs
- Seetharam
- Dheerendra Gopal
- Kunigal Ramanath
- Babu
- Appu
- Raghavachar
- Shanthala
- Theresamma
- Saroja
- Geetha
- Prema
- Baby Shakunthala
- Baby Geetha
- Master Girimurthy
- Master Raju
- T. R. Narasimharaju
