= Edakallu Guddada Mele =

- VCD cover
- Directed by: Puttanna Kanagal
- Screenplay by: Puttanna Kanagal
- Based on: Edakallu Guddada Mele by Bharathisutha
- Produced by: Srikanth Nahatha; Srikanth Patel
- Starring: Jayanthi; Aarathi; Ranga; Cudavalli Chandrashekar; Shivaram
- Cinematography: S. V. Srikanth
- Edited by: S. P. N. Krishna; T. P. Velayudham
- Music by: M. Ranga Rao
- Distributed by: Srikanth & Srikanth Enterprises
- Release date: 1973
- Country: India
- Language: Kannada

Edakallu Guddada Mele ( transl. Atop the Edakallu Hills) is a 1973 Indian Kannada-language film directed by Puttanna Kanagal starring Jayanthi, Aarathi, Ranga, Cudavalli Chandrashekar, and Shivaram.

== Plot ==
The film is based on Edakallu Guddada Mele by Bharathi Suta, which is an adaptation of the English novel Lady Chatterley's Lover by D. H. Lawrence.[1] It's about the extramarital affair of a woman whose husband is impotent.

== Cast ==
- Jayanthi as Madhavi, the captain's wife
- Aarathi as Devaki, Madhavi's younger sister
- Ranga as Captain Kumar, an ex-soldier
- Cudavalli Chandrashekar as Nanjunda, captain's neighbor.
- Shivaram as Nanjunda's uncle

== Production ==
The song "Yaavoorava Iva" was shot in Kodagu.

== Release ==
The film received 'A' certificate by the CBFC. The DVD was released with U certificate with some cuts required for recertification. However, a part of the deleted scenes created a furore when they resurfaced online in 2021. The movie was dubbed in Hindi as Prem Aur Vaasna.

== Soundtrack ==
M. Ranga Rao composed the music. The evergreen song "Viraha Nooru Nooru Taraha" became an huge hit and singer P. Susheela was praised for her excellent singing.

Track listing
No.	Title	Lyrics	Singer(s)	Length
1.	"Sanyaasi Sanyaasi"	R. N. Jayagopal	S. Janaki	3:13
2.	"Yaaroorava Iva"	K. Prabhakar Shastry	S. Janaki	3:34
3.	"Santosha Sangeetha"	Vijaya Narasimha	P. Susheela, S. P. Balasubrahmanyam	3:12
4.	"Nillu Nille"	Vijaya Narasimha	S. Janaki	3:20
5.	"Gundina Matte Gammatu"	M. Narendra Badu	S. P. Balasubrahmanyam	3:20
6.	"Viraha Nooru Taraha"	Vijaya Narasimha	P. Susheela	4:57
Total length:				28:52

== Reception ==
The movie was a big hit. Film analysts though were skeptical of Kanagal's handling of the theme. According to film historian K Puttaswamy, “It was extraordinary in its making but quite conservative in approach. It looks at losing one’s chastity as a sin and death as the solution. It is also a turning point in Kanagal’s career since from then he was quite conservative in his handling of women’s issues".

== See also ==
- Edakkal caves
