= Shubhamangala =

- Directed by: Puttanna Kanagal
- Written by: Vani
- Screenplay by: Puttanna Kanagal
- Based on: Shubhamangala by Vani
- Produced by: Ravi
- Starring: Srinath; Aarathi
- Cinematography: N. G. Rao
- Edited by: Bal G. Yadav
- Music by: Vijaya Bhaskar
- Production company: Raghunandan International
- Release date: 1975
- Running time: 161 minutes
- Country: India
- Language: Kannada

Shubhamangala is a 1975 Indian Kannada language film directed by Puttanna Kanagal, based on a novel of the same name by Vani, starring Aarathi and Srinath. The supporting cast features Shivaram, Ambareesh, Musuri Krishnamurthy and K. S. Ashwath.

== Plot ==
Hema is a pampered girl brought up by her doting father in a small town. Timma and Mooga are her servants, but she treats them like her friends. Hema meets Prabhakara, her cousin, who is visiting their town after many years. Hema's father, who has a longstanding feud with Prabhakara and his family sows the seeds of hatred in Hema's mind as well. In a twist of fate, when Hema's father loses all his wealth and passes away, Hema and her two servants are left with no choice but to move in with Prabhakara. The self-respecting Hema gets a job and strives to become self-reliant. When another twist of fate restores her wealth to her, she is forced to choose between the hate she was taught or the love Prabhakara has showered on her. The movie is an excellent study of the growth of Hema's character from a spoilt rich girl to an independent and mellow woman capable of making decision rationally.

== Cast ==
- Srinath as Prabhakara and his father (dual role)
- Aarathi as Hema, Prabhakara's cousin
- Ambareesh as Mooga
- Shivaram as Thimma
- Loknath as Advocate Anand Rao
- B. V. Radha as Radha, Anand Rao's daughter
- K. S. Ashwath as Doctor (Cameo)
- B. Jaya
- Musuri Krishnamurthy (Cameo)
- Upasane Seetharam as Srinivasayya, Hema's father

== Soundtrack ==
The music of the film was composed by Vijaya Bhaskar with lyrics penned by Kanagal Prabhakara Shasthry, Vijaya Narasimha, Chi. Udaya Shankar and M. N. Vyasa Rao.

=== Track List ===
No.	Title	Lyrics	Singer(s)	Length
1.	"Shubhamangala Sumuhurthave"	Kanagal Prabhakara Shastry	P. B. Sreenivas, Vani Jairam
2.	"Hoovondu Bali Bandu"	Vijaya Narasimha	R. N. Sudarshan
3.	"Snehada Kadalalli"	Chi. Udayashankar	S. P. Balasubrahmanyam
4.	"Ee Shathamanada Maadari Hennu"	Vijaya Narasimha	Vani Jairam
5.	"Suryangu Chandrangu"	M. N. Vyasa Rao	K. S. L. Swamy
6.	"Hema Naakondla Naaku"	M. N. Vyasa Rao	S. P. Balasubrahmanyam

== Reception ==
The Hindu listed this film alongside five other films for which Ambareesh earned critical acclaim for his acting.
