= Ranganayaki (1981 film) =

- VCD cover
- Directed by: Puttanna Kanagal
- Screenplay by: Puttanna Kanagal; Yoganarasimhamurthy
- Based on: Ranganayaki by Ashwattha
- Produced by: B. Thimmanna
- Starring: Aarathi; Ambareesh; Ramakrishna; Ashok; Rajanand
- Cinematography: S. Maruthi Rao
- Edited by: V. P. Krishna
- Music by: M. Ranga Rao
- Distributed by: Sri Ashok Arts
- Release date: 1981
- Country: India
- Language: Kannada

Ranganayaki (transl. The Heroine of the Stage) is a 1981 Indian Kannada language film directed by Puttanna Kanagal starring Aarathi, Ambareesh, Ramakrishna, Ashok, Rajanand. The film is based on the novel of the same name by Ashwattha.

== Plot ==
Ranganayaki is a theater artiste who plays the lead female role in all the plays staged by the drama company owned by her foster-father. When a rich man, Nagaraja, falls in love with her, she marries him and draws the curtain on her career. The drama company falls on tough times after her departure. On one occasion, when the drama company faces an emergency with the new actress absconding, Ranganayaki dons the grease paint to save her father's reputation. This one act ends her marriage, and her husband leaves town with their year-old son.

Ranganayaki returns to theater but with the death of her father, and in the face of mounting losses is forced to close the drama company. Supported by her foster-brother Ramanna she goes onto become a popular movie heroine 'Mala'. Twenty years later, Shekhar, a college student, not only becomes her most ardent fan but also becomes besotted by her. Neither is aware of their true relationship – that they are mother and son. A chance meeting with her ex-husband makes 'Mala' yearn to meet her son. While circumstances make sure this does not happen, by the time Shekhar realizes the truth about her identity, 'Mala' who has bouts of depression, would have taken her own life.

== Cast ==
- Aarathi as Ranganayaki / Mala
- Ashok as Nagaraj Shetty
- Ramakrishna as Shekhar
- Ambareesh as Ramanna
- Rajanand as Shyamanna
- Sudha Rani as young Ranganayaki
- Sadashiva Brahmavar as Krishnappa
- Kunigal Ramanath
- B. K. Shankar as Basava
- Shringar Nagaraj as a stage actor
- Gangadhar as Seth (cameo)
- Dinesh as Venkataramana Shetty (cameo)
- Musuri Krishnamurthy as Nagaraj's uncle (cameo)
- M. Jayashree as Pankajamma (cameo)

== Soundtrack ==
Song title	Singer (s)	Lyrics
"Mandhara Pushpavu"	P. Jayachandran, S. P. Sailaja	Vijaya Narasimha
"Hrudaya Jhenkara"	S. Janaki, S. P. Balasubrahmanyam	K. Prabhakar Shasthry
"Premadalli Snehadalli"	S. P. Balasubrahmanyam	M. N. Vyasa Rao
"Jai Jagadambe"	S. Janaki	Vijaya Narasimha
"Kannada Naadina"	S. P. Balasubrahmanyam, S. P. Sailaja	K. Prabhakar Shasthry

== Reception ==
After watching the film Mangalore, Sreekumaran Thampi, a friend of Kanagal, was impressed with Ambareesh's performance in the film and cast him in Gaanam (1982).

In 2018 following Ambareesh's death, The Hindu listed this film alongside five other films for which he earned critical acclaim for his acting.

== Awards ==
1980–81 Karnataka State Film Awards

- First Best film – B. Thimmanna
- Best Actress – Aarathi
- Best Supporting Actor – Ramakrishna
