= Hum Paanch (film) =

1980 Hindi language action film

- Directed by: Bapu
- Screenplay by: Mullapudi Venkata Ramana
- Based on: Paduvaaralli Pandavaru by Puttana Kanagal
- Produced by: Boney Kapoor; Surinder Kapoor
- Starring: Sanjeev Kumar; Shabana Azmi; Mithun Chakraborty; Deepti Naval; Naseeruddin Shah; Raj Babbar; Uday Chandra; Gulshan Grover; Amrish Puri
- Cinematography: Sharad Kadwe
- Edited by: Kamlakar Karkhanis
- Music by: Laxmikant–Pyarelal
- Production company: S. K. Films Enterprises
- Release date: 9 January 1981
- Running time: 180 mins
- Country: India
- Language: Hindi

Hum Paanch (transl. Us Five) is a 1981 Hindi language action film directed by Bapu and produced by Boney Kapoor. The film features an all-star cast including Sanjeev Kumar, Shabana Azmi, Mithun Chakraborty, Deepti Naval, Naseeruddin Shah, Raj Babbar, Uday Chandra, Gulshan Grover (in his film debut) and Amrish Puri. The film was a surprise and big hit at the box office, and the 7th highest-grossing Hindi Film at the domestic box office of the year 1981.

The movie was Boney Kapoor's maiden venture as a producer. A young Anil Kapoor, who is Boney Kapoor's brother, has a cameo appearance. This film is a remake of 1978 Kannada film Paduvaaralli Pandavaru, directed by Puttanna Kanagal which was also remade by Bapu earlier in Telugu as Mana Voori Pandavulu (1978).

== Cast ==
- Sanjeev Kumar as Krishna
- Shabana Azmi as Sundariya
- Mithun Chakraborty as Bheema
- Deepti Naval as Lajiya "Lajjo"
- Naseeruddin Shah as Suraj
- Raj Babbar as Arjun
- Uday Chandra as Swaroop
- Gulshan Grover as Mahaveer
- Aruna Irani as Nishi
- Amrish Puri as Thakur Veer Pratap Singh
- Anil Kapoor as Aadesh
- A. K. Hangal as Pandit
- Geeta Siddharth as Veer Pratap's Sister
- Roopesh Kumar as Vijay
- Kanhaiyalal as Lala Nainsukh Prasad Shrivastav
- Kalpana Iyer in song "Aaiye Meherban"
- Leena Das in song "Aaiye Meherban"
- Phiroza Cooper in song "Aaiye Meherban"
- Sujata Bakshi in song "Aaiye Meherban"

== Soundtrack ==
All lyrics are written by Anand Bakshi; all music is composed by Laxmikant–Pyarelal.

No.	Title	Singer(s)	Length
1.	"Aati Hai Palki"	Kishore Kumar, Mahendra Kapoor	6:21
2.	"Ka Jaanu Main"	Amit Kumar, Lata Mangeshkar	5:15
3.	"Kya Kahiye Bhagwan Se"	Mohammad Rafi	2:31
4.	"Aapno Se Munh Mod Ke"	Mohammad Rafi	1:43
5.	"Hum Paanch Pandav"	Shailendra Singh, Amit Kumar, Anwar, Suresh Wadekar	4:49
6.	"Aaiye Meharban"	Usha Uthup	5:36
7.	"Dheere Chal Zara"	Mohammad Rafi	5:11
8.	"Ye Soye Insaan"	Mohammad Rafi	1:45
