= Naniruvude Ninagagi =

- Directed by: A. V. Seshagiri Rao
- Written by: Chi. Udaya Shankar (dialogues)
- Screenplay by: A. V. Seshagiri Rao; M. D. Sundar
- Story by: A. V. Seshagiri Rao
- Produced by: R. V. Gurupada
- Starring: Vishnuvardhan; Aarathi; Deepa; Balakrishna
- Cinematography: S. V. Srikanth
- Edited by: P. Bhakthavathsalam
- Music by: Rajan–Nagendra
- Production company: G R P Arts
- Distributed by: G R P Arts
- Release date: 24 September 1979
- Running time: 132 min
- Country: India
- Language: Kannada

Naniruvude Ninagagi is a 1979 Indian Kannada-language film, directed by A. V. Seshagiri Rao Rao and produced by R. V. Gurupada. The film stars Vishnuvardhan, Aarathi, Deepa and Balakrishna. The film has musical score by Rajan–Nagendra.

== Cast ==
- Vishnuvardhan as Vijay
- Aarathi as Sarasa
- Deepa as Shobha
- Balakrishna as Vijay's father
- Dwarkish as John and Vincent
- Dinesh as Columbus
- Musuri Krishnamurthy as Vincent's father-in-law
- Sundar Krishna Urs as Shyamsunder
- Leelavathi as Parvathi
- Pramila Joshai
- Shanthala
- Sathish
- Hanumanthachar
- Tiger Prabhakar as Shyamsunder's accomplice
- Chandrahas
- Bheema Raj
- Rajkumar
- Dr. Natarajan
- Papamma
- Lalithamma
- Geetha
- Sharadamma
- Revathi
- Thipatur Siddaramaiah
- Police Mahadevappa
- G. S. Vasu

== Soundtrack ==
The music was composed by Rajan–Nagendra.

No.	Song	Singers	Lyrics	Length (m:ss)
1	Premada Haadige	S. P. Balasubrahmanyam, S. Janaki	Chi. Udaya Shankar	04:12
2	Nannallu Ninnallu	S. P. Balasubrahmanyam, S. Janaki	R. N. Jayagopal	04:11
3	Nalla Ennale Ninna	S. Janaki	Chi. Udaya Shankar	04:36
4	Olavina Gelayane	S. Janaki	Chi. Udaya Shankar	03:46
5	Kumkumaviruvude Hanegaagi	S. P. Balasubrahmanyam	Chi. Udaya Shankar	04:20
6	Jooly Nanna Jooly	S. Janaki, S. P. Balasubrahmanyam	Chi. Udaya Shankar	04:21
