= Premada Kanike =

1976 film by V. Somashekhar

- Poster
- Directed by: V. Somashekhar
- Screenplay by: Chi. Udaya Shankar
- Story by: Salim–Javed
- Produced by: Jayadevi
- Starring: Rajkumar; Aarathi; Jayamala
- Cinematography: D. V. Rajaram
- Edited by: P. Bhakthavathsalam
- Music by: Upendra Kumar
- Production company: Jayadevi Films
- Release date: 28 February 1976
- Running time: 151 minutes
- Country: India
- Language: Kannada

Premada Kanike ( transl. A Token of Love) is a 1976 Indian Kannada-language crime thriller film directed by V. Somashekhar and written by the duo Salim–Javed. It was produced by Jayadevi under the banner of Jayadevi films. The film starred Rajkumar, Aarathi and Jayamala in lead roles with Vajramuni and Rajashankar in supporting roles. The plot follows a teacher hired by rich man to home-school his daughter. En route, she witnesses a murder and discovers that the murderer is the father of her student.

The story of the film was written by the acclaimed duo Salim–Javed who made their debut in South Indian cinema as original story writers for which they rehashed the story of the 1969 film Do Bhai, by retaining only the core plotline which was originally credited only to Salim Khan under the name of Prince Salim. This was Salim–Javed's first release after Sholay. The film also marked the onscreen debuts of Rajkumar's children — Lohith and Poornima Rajkumar. It was remade in Tamil in 1980 as Polladhavan and in Hindi in 1981 as Raaz.

Premada Kanike saw a theatrical run of 25 weeks upon release and was declared a blockbuster at the box-office. The film has since attained cult status for redefining the thriller genre in Kannada cinema. The songs composed by Upendra Kumar were received extremely well and considered evergreen hits. The film went on to win multiple awards and accolades including the Karnataka State Film Award for Third Best Film.

== Plot ==
Seetha, a young woman, is travelling by train with her nephew, Raju, to attend a job interview for the position of nanny to Manohar, an estate merchant's, daughter, Shobha. Her fellow passenger is shot dead by an unidentified man. Seetha witnesses the murder and clearly remembers the murderer's face. She reports the murder to police inspector Ashok. Seetha is appointed as Shobha's nanny, and the two grow fond of each other before Manohar returns from his trip. When she sees him, Seetha realises that he is the murderer she saw on the train. Manohar threatens Seetha not to tell anyone, and ensures that she cannot leave his estate in case she reports him to the police.

Seetha tries to escape many times, but she is always caught. She doesn't even tell the police when she meets them, because Manohar has threatened to kill Raju if she does. Later, Seetha sees beyond Manohar's rough and mean exterior and grows fond of him. However, she is confused as to why such a nice man would behave arrogantly. Flashbacks reveal that Manohar and Kumudha fell in love, got married and shortly afterwards their daughter Shobha was born. Kumudha's uncle, Chandru, who was eager to marry her, was sent to jail by Manohar for trying to kill him and Kumudha. He was released from jail when his sentence ended. While Manohar was away from home, Chandru killed Kumudha. She then committed suicide, and Manohar wanted to die with her. However, she made him promise to get revenge on Chandru for separating them, and to take care of Shobha. Manohar also reveals that the man he killed on the train was Chandru.

Seetha now understands his actions and vows not to tell anyone. Moorthy's colleague is curious about Seetha. She said that she remembered the face and was eager to find the murderer. However, she has now told Moorthy that she has forgotten the face. Therefore, he suspects Seetha to be the murderer, a belief that Moorthy shares. On Shoba's birthday, Manohar plans to announce that he is handing over all his wealth to Seetha and surrendering to the police. However, before he can do so, the police arrive and try to arrest Seetha. Manohar saves her by confessing to the murder, going to trial, and explaining his actions. However, a crippled assassin arrives at the court and reveals the truth about Chandru's death, identifying himself as Kumudha's brother. He says goodbye to Shobha and Manohar, and Seetha, Manohar, Shobha and Raju all live together as a family.

== Cast ==
- Dr. Rajkumar as Manohar
- Aarathi as Seetha
- Jayamala as Kumudha, Manohar's wife
- Vajramuni as Chandru
- Rajashankar as Kumudha's brother
- Balakrishna as Madhavayya
- Sampath
- Thoogudeepa Srinivas as Inspector Ashok
- Rajanand as superintendent of police
- Baby Poornima Rajkumar as Shobha, Manohar's daughter
- Master Rajkumar (Lohith)(Puneeth Rajkumar)
- Shani Mahadevappa
- Honnavalli Krishna
- B. Jaya as Gajalakshmi, Madhavayya's daughter
- B. Ramadevi as Madhavayya's wife
- Bhatti Mahadevappa
- Joker Shyam as Shyam
- G. V. Shivanand as Judge
- Shivaji Rao
- Pushpa (Pramila Joshai)
- Rajani
- Mallesh
- Venkataraju
- Baby Rajeshwari
- Baby Jaishanthi
- Rathnamala
- Jayamma
- Rajinikanth in a photograph as suspect (uncredited)

== Production ==
The movie was done by Rajkumar for free of cost as a compensation for producer B.Mallik for the losses suffered by him for the 1971 film Sakshatkara. Salim - Javed were approached for the story. However, they were annoyed during story narration as they felt Chi. Udayashankar - the screenplay writer - seemed uninterested. However, Udayashankar surprised them by giving the gist in just four sentences which eventually lead to drastic change from the source material - while the coreplot was retained, the romantic story in the flashback portion was given equal prominence unlike in Do Bhai and the entire story of lead actor's lawyer brother's character and his feelings towards the heroine were removed and instead a police officer friend character was introduced.

Large portions of the film were extensively shot in the Kashmir Valley and Shimla. This was rare for a Kannada film of 1970s due to the elevation of production costs which such a location could have caused then.

In the movie, the heroine Seetha (played by actress Aarathi) witnesses a murder. Later, Inspector Ashok (played by Thoogudeepa Srinivas) takes her to the police station and shows her a batch of photos of known criminals and suspects to see if she can identify the killer. The second photo she flips through is a real-life headshot of Rajinikanth. According to film producer Balaji Prabhu, a magazine had reported that Rajinikanth had used that black-and-white photo to audition for the film and after he heard that the film shoot was almost over, he was dubious that he would feature in the film. Much to his despise, the makers of the film had used his photo in the film and had no role to offer him.

== Soundtrack ==
Premada Kanike

Soundtrack album by Upendra Kumar
- Released: 1976
- Genre: Feature film soundtrack
- Label: Saregama

Upendra Kumar composed the music for the soundtracks and lyrics were penned by Chi. Udaya Shankar and Vijaya Narasimha. The female singer, H. P. Geetha who sang her only duet with Rajkumar in this movie through the song "Naguveya Henne Naanu", was the wife of music director Upendra Kumar.

Tracklist
No.	Title	Lyrics	Singer(s)	Length
1.	"Putta Putta"	Chi. Udaya Shankar	S. Janaki
2.	"Baanigondu Elle Ellide"	Chi. Udaya Shankar	Rajkumar
3.	"Chinna Endu Naguthiru"	Chi. Udaya Shankar	P. B. Sreenivas
4.	"Idu Yaaru Bareda Katheyo"	Chi. Udaya Shankar	Rajkumar
5.	"Naguveya Henne Naanu"	Vijaya Narasimha	Rajkumar, H. P. Geetha
6.	"Na Bidalare Endu Ninna"	Vijaya Narasimha	Rajkumar, Vani Jairam

== Awards ==
1975–76 Karnataka State Film Awards

- Best Film
- Best Dialogue writer — Chi. Udaya Shankar
- Best Editing — P. Bhaktavatsalam
- Best Child Actress — Poornima Rajkumar
