= Gandharvagiri =

Gandharva Giri
- Directed by: N. S. Dhananjaya (Datthu)
- Written by: M. Narendra Babu (dialogues)
- Screenplay by: N. S. Dhananjaya (Datthu)
- Story by: Saisuthe (Based on a novel of same name)
- Produced by: N. S. Mukund; H. S. Chandru; B. A. Anasuya; Veena Nagaraj
- Starring: Vishnuvardhan; Aarathi; J. V. Somayajulu; Anupama
- Cinematography: S. Ramachandra
- Edited by: V. P. Krishna
- Music by: Upendra Kumar
- Production company: Nataraj Pictures
- Distributed by: Nataraj Pictures
- Release date: 30 July 1983
- Running time: 129 minutes
- Country: India
- Language: Kannada

Gandharva Giri is a 1983 Indian Kannada-language film, directed by N. S. Dhananjaya (Datthu) and produced by N. S. Mukund, H. S. Chandru, B. A. Anasuya and Veena Nagaraj. It is based on the novel of the same name by Saisuthe. The film stars Vishnuvardhan, Aarathi, J. V. Somayajulu and Anupama. The film has musical score by Upendra Kumar.

== Cast ==
- Vishnuvardhan
- Aarathi
- J. V. Somayajulu as Narasimha Joshi
- Maanu
- Anupama
- Sundar Krishna Urs
- Rajanand
- Leelavathi
- Sathyapriya in Guest Appearance

== Soundtrack ==
The music was composed by Upendra Kumar.

No.	Song	Singers	Lyrics	Length (m:ss)
1	"O Nalle"	S. P. Balasubrahmanyam, S. P. Sailaja	M. N. Vyasarao	04:40
2	"Ammanu Nudida"	S. P. Balasubrahmanyam	Chi. Udaya Shankar	04:24
3	"Gandharvagiriyali"	S. Janaki, S. P. Sailaja, S. P. Balasubrahmanyam	Vijaya Narasimha	04:14
4	"Idethako Ee Samshaya"	S. Janaki	Vijaya Narasimha	04:07
5	"Narasimha Mantra"	S. P. Balasubrahmanyam	Purandaradasa	03:14
