= Hanthakana Sanchu =

- Directed by: B. Krishan
- Written by: R. N. Jayagopal (dialogues)
- Screenplay by: R. N. Jayagopal
- Story by: R. N. Jayagopal
- Produced by: K. S. Jagannath
- Starring: Vishnuvardhan; Aarathi; Lokanath; Sundar Krishna Urs
- Cinematography: N. G. Rao
- Edited by: Victor Yadav
- Music by: Vijaya Bhaskar
- Production company: Kalajyothi
- Distributed by: Kalajyothi
- Release date: 23 June 1980
- Running time: 136 minutes
- Country: India
- Language: Kannada

Hanthakana Sanchu ( transl. Killer's plot) is a 1980 Indian Kannada-language film, directed by B. Krishan and produced by K. S. Jagannath. The film stars Vishnuvardhan, Aarathi, and Jayamala. The film has musical score by Vijaya Bhaskar.

== Cast ==
- Vishnuvardhan as Dr. Murali
- Aarathi as Anita
- Jayamala as Aparna
- Rekha Rao as Mamata
- Sundar Krishna Urs as George
- Lokanath as Kaverappa
- Mukhyamantri Chandru as Robert
- Bhargavi Narayan as mother
- Halam
- Ramachandran
- Boregowda
- Lalithamma
- Jaggu
- Pradeep
- Arun

== Plot ==
Dr. Murali who is treating a pregnant Mamata, gets acquainted to her sister Anita, through George her husband. Murali and Anita fall in love and get married without the knowledge of Murali's parents. Murali's mother and his maternal uncle Kaverappa, want him to marry Aparna (Kaverappa's daughter). Murali avoids the marriage, by giving false excuses. Meanwhile, Anita becomes pregnant and differences crop up between the couple since Murali is not ready to tell his parents about his marriage. Anita starts working in Robert's firm. Robert had feelings for Anita, which was rejected by her before she met Murli. In the meantime Aparna gets to know about Murali's secret marriage, while visiting him at his place and informs her father. George is unhappy with Murali and gets into a fight with him.

Anita gets killed mysteriously when Murli and Anita are about to visit his parents. How Murali finds Anita's killer forms the climax of the movie.

== Soundtrack ==
The music was composed by Vijayabhaskar.

No.	Song	Singers	Lyrics	Length (m:ss)
1	"Kan Kan Thumbide"	P. Susheela	Chi. Udaya Shankar	03:48
2	"Aasegala"	Vani Jairam, Kasturi Shankar, Vishnuvardhan	R. N. Jayagopal	04:23
3	"Jeevana Sanjeevana"	Vani Jairam, Jayachandran	Kuvempu	04:41
4	"Aaha Ramanchana"	S. P. Balasubrahmanyam, Kasturi Shankar	Vijaya Narasimha	04:20
