= Dharmasere =

- Directed by: Puttanna Kanagal
- Screenplay by: Puttanna Kanagal
- Based on: Dharma Sere by Jada Bharatha
- Produced by: Aarathi
- Starring: Srinath; Aarathi; Sathyapriya; Jai Jagadish
- Cinematography: S. Maruti Rao
- Edited by: V. P. Krishnan
- Music by: Upendra Kumar
- Production company: Sri Amba Films
- Release date: 7 March 1979
- Country: India
- Language: Kannada

Dharmasere (lit. 'The Religious Bind') is a 1979 Indian Kannada-language romance film, based on the novel of the same name by Jada Bharatha. It was adapted into a screenplay by Puttanna Kanagal and produced by actress Aarathi under the banner Sri Amba Films. The film stars Aarathi as Tunga, Srinath as Maadhu and Sathyapriya as Leela. The film tells the story of a mute girl who gets married off to her sister's husband and live the solitary life.

The theme of the film is based on a poignant portrayal of young dumb women of that era, the scorn, humiliation and neglect they faced from the society. It has cinematography by S. Maruti Rao, and editing by V. P. Krishnan. The original score and songs were composed by Upendra Kumar, with lyrics by Vijaya Narasimha, and songs featuring the voices of S. P. Balasubrahmanyam and S. Janaki.

Upon release, the film was critically acclaimed and also was commercially successful. At the 27th Filmfare Awards South, the film won three awards including Best film and Best actress for Aarathi and also Best director for Kanagal. Aarathi was also awarded Karnataka State Film Award for Best Actress for her portrayal of deaf and dumb woman.

== Plot ==
This movie explores the plight of a dumb young woman Tunga. Maadhu the hero falls in love with Tunga's younger sister Leela. But the father of the girls is in the "Dharmasere" (the religious bind) that he can't get his younger daughter married even as the elder daughter is unmarried. So he requests Maadhu to marry both of them even if it is a symbolic marriage to the elder dumb girl. As fate would have it, the younger one fails to beget offspring. Desperate for an offspring, Maadhu turns to Tunga and she promptly begets a child.

== Cast ==
- Aarathi as Tunga
- Srinath as Maadhu
- Sathyapriya as Leela
- Seetharam as Govardhana Raaya
- Sathyabhama as Ramabai
- Jayashree
- Baby Nandini
- Musuri Krishnamurthy
- Shivaram
- Cudavalli Chandrashekar
- Jai Jagadish
- Dikki Madhava Rao

== Soundtrack ==
Dharmasere

Soundtrack album by Upendra Kumar
- Released: 1979
- Genre: World Music
- Label: Saregama

The music was composed by Upendra Kumar and the lyrics were written by Vijaya Narasimha.

No.	Song	Singers	Lyrics	Length (m:ss)
1	"Ee Sambhashane"	S. P. Balasubrahmanyam, S. Janaki	Vijaya Narasimha	3:48
2	"Mooka Hakkiyu"	S. P. Balasubrahmanyam, S. Janaki	Vijaya Narasimha	3:12
3	"Kandaa O Nanna Kanda"	S. P. Balasubrahmanyam	Vijaya Narasimha	5:39

== Awards ==
- Karnataka State Film Award for Best Actress - Aarathi
- Filmfare Award for Best Film - Kannada - Aarathi
- Filmfare Award for Best Director – Kannada - Puttanna Kanagal
- Filmfare Award for Best Actress – Kannada - Aarathi
