= Bangarada Jinke =

- Directed by: T. S. Nagabharana
- Written by: B. S. Somasundar
- Screenplay by: B. S. Somasundar
- Produced by: B. S. Somasundar; T. S. Narasimhan
- Starring: Vishnuvardhan; Bharathi; Aarathi; Leelavathi; Sundar Raj
- Cinematography: S. Ramachandra
- Edited by: Yadav Victor
- Music by: Vijaya Bhaskar
- Production company: Kavitha Komal Productions
- Release date: 1980
- Running time: 140 minutes
- Country: India
- Language: Kannada

Bangarada Jinke ( transl. Golden Deer) is a 1980 Indian Kannada-language film, directed by T. S. Nagabharana and produced by B. S. Somasundar and T. S. Narasimhan under the banner of Kavitha Komal Productions. It stars Vishnuvardhan, Bharathi, Aarathi, Leelavathi, Pramila Joshai and Sundar Raj.

Anant Nag's Janma Janmada Anubandha and Vishnuvardhan's Bangarada Jinke released in the same year and both the films had reincarnation as their central theme.

== Plot ==
It is a story of rebirth and revenge in the midst of a treasure hunt for the golden deer.

== Cast ==
- Vishnuvardhan Charu in earlier birth and as Veeru during rebirth
- Bharathi as Bhagya
- Aarathi as Asha
- Leelavathi as Veeru's mother
- Pramila Joshai as Komali
- Sundar Raj as Peter
- Lokanath in a cameo as Rajappa, Asha's Uncle
- Shivaram in a cameo as lecturer
- Musuri Krishnamurthy as Pandita
- Shakti Prasad as Bijju
- Vijay
- B. R. Jayaram
- Mico Chandru
- B. S. Achar
- Shivajirao
- Kaminidharan
- Sripramila
- Umashree as Asha's friend
- Rekha
- Master Chethan

== Notes ==
The song "Olume Siriya Kandu" picturised on Vishnuvardhan and Bharathi was shot at the Channarayana Durga Hill. Bangara Nayaka's Fort is Channarayana Durga, which is atop the Channarayana Hill in the vicinity of the Madhugiri Betta, near Tumkur in Karnataka.

== Soundtrack ==
Bangarada Jinke

Soundtrack album to Bangarada Jinke by Vijaya Bhaskar
- Language: Kannada
- Label: Sangeetha

The music of the film was composed by Vijaya Bhaskar

No.	Song	Singers	Lyricist
1	"Sangaathiyu Bali Baarade"	Vani Jairam	Doddarange Gowda
2	"Olume Siriya Kandu"	S. P. Balasubrahmanyam, Vani Jairam	Doddarange Gowda
3	"Kenakiruve"	Vani Jairam	Doddarange Gowda
4	"Olume Siriya Kandu"	S. P. Balasubrahmanyam	Doddarange Gowda
