= Karmika Kallanalla =

- Directed by: K. S. R. Das
- Written by: Chi. Udaya Shankar
- Screenplay by: M. D. Sundar
- Story by: M. D. Sundar
- Produced by: A. L. Abbaiah Naidu
- Starring: Vishnuvardhan; Shankar Nag; Dwarakish; Vajramuni
- Cinematography: R. Madhusudan
- Edited by: P. Sambashiva Ravu; K. Rama Mohana Rao
- Music by: G. K. Venkatesh
- Production company: Madhu Art Films
- Distributed by: Madhu Art Films
- Release date: 8 June 1982
- Running time: 155 min
- Country: India
- Language: Kannada

Karmika Kallanalla is a 1982 Indian Kannada film, directed by K. S. R. Das and produced by A. L. Abbaiah Naidu. The film stars Vishnuvardhan, Aarathi, Shankar Nag, Swapna and Dwarakish in lead roles. The film has musical score by G. K. Venkatesh.

== Cast ==
- Vishnuvardhan as Mohan Raj (Raja)
- Aarathi as Lakshmi
- Shankar Nag as Sudhakar
- Swapna as Dr. Malathi
- Tiger Prabhakar as Wilson (Special Appearance)
- Maanu as Sampath
- Dwarakish as Kittu
- Vajramuni as Naresh
- A. L. Abbainaidu (Cameo)
- Jyothilakshmi
- Baby Shanthi
- Chethan Ramarao
- Hanumanthachar
- Negro Johnny
