= Khaidi (1984 film) =

- Directed by: K. S. R. Das
- Written by: Chi. Udaya Shankar (dialogues)
- Screenplay by: K. S. R. Das
- Story by: Paruchuri Brothers
- Based on: Khaidi (1983) by A. Kodandarami Reddy
- Produced by: G. R. K. Raju
- Starring: Vishnuvardhan; Aarathi; Madhavi; Jayamalini
- Cinematography: V. Lakshman
- Edited by: D. Venkata Rathnam
- Music by: K. Chakravarthy
- Production company: Vishwa Chitra Productions
- Distributed by: Vishwa Chitra Productions
- Release date: 29 May 1984
- Running time: 142 min
- Country: India
- Language: Kannada

Khaidi ( transl. Prisoner) is a 1984 Indian Kannada-language film directed by K. S. R. Das and produced by G. R. K. Raju. The film stars Vishnuvardhan, Aarathi, Madhavi and Jayamalini in the lead roles. K. S. R. Das wrote the screenplay, while the dialogues were written by Chi. Udaya Shankar. The film has musical score by K. Chakravarthy. Cinematography was done by V. Lakshman.

The film is a remake of the 1983 Telugu film of the same name starring Chiranjeevi. Madhavi reprised her role from the original version. The film tells the story of a hardworking young man and his revenge against the people who killed his father and sister and sent him to jail, by falsely accusing him of killing his sister.

== Plot ==
Veerabhadraiah is a feudal lord presiding over a village along with his henchmen, which include his assistant and the village sarpanch. Veerabhadraiah lends money to Venkateswarlu, a local farmer living with his widowed daughter. His son Suryam is a hard working student living in a nearby city and he falls in love with Veerabhadraiah's daughter – Madhulatha. Realising this, Veerabhadraiah asks Venkateswarlu to ask his son to stop seeing his daughter, to which Venkateswarlu does not agree. Veerabhadraiah kills Venkateswarlu and asks Suryam to pay back the money which he had given to them as a loan. Suryam asks for some time and with the help of his elder sister raises crops to sell and repay the loan. Just as the crops are ready for harvest, Veerabhadraiah and his henchmen not only destroy the crop but also try to sexually abuse Suryam's sister, during which she commits suicide. Being the village head, Veerabhadraiah implicates Suryam in the death of his sister, saying that he was forcing her into prostitution, due to which she committed suicide. Suryam is arrested by the police. The rest of the movie deals with how Suryam escapes from jail and with the help of Sujatha, a doctor, avenges the decimation of his family.

== Cast ==
- Vishnuvardhan as Surya
- Aarathi as Dr. Sujatha
- Madhavi
- Jayamalini
- Sangeeta
- Nithya as Baby
- Anuradha
- Dheerendra Gopal as Veerabhadrayya
- R. N. Sudarshan
- Mukhyamantri Chandru
- B. K. Shankar
- Thyagaraj Urs
- Dingri Nagaraj
- Maanu in a cameo
- Rajakumar
- Pattabhi
- Ranga
- Lakshminarayana Murthy
- Madan
- Srikanth
- Suryakumar

== Soundtrack ==
1. Surasundari E Menakayu - S P Balasubrahmanyam and P Susheela
2. Thalay Hoova Edayinda - S P Balasubrahmanyam and P Susheela
3. Muthay Maniye - Vishnuvardhan and S Janaki
4. Naale Enna Beda - S Janaki
5. Endoe Kanda Nenapu - S P Balasubrahmanyam and P Susheela
