= Naga Kala Bhairava =

1981 Indian film directed by Thiptur Raghu

- Directed by: Tiptur Raghu
- Written by: Kunigal Nagabhushan (dialogues)
- Screenplay by: Tiptur Raghu
- Story by: M. Pandurangan
- Produced by: M. Pandurangan; M. Ramalingam
- Starring: Vishnuvardhan; Jayanthi; Jayamala; Ashalatha
- Cinematography: Benjamin
- Edited by: P. Bhakthavatsalam
- Music by: M. Ranga Rao
- Production company: Sri Lakshmi Cine Productions
- Distributed by: Sri Lakshmi Cine Productions
- Release date: 30 April 1981
- Running time: 147 min
- Country: India
- Language: Kannada

Naga Kala Bhairava is a 1981 Indian Kannada-language film, directed by Thiptur Raghu and produced by M. Pandurangan and M. Ramalingam. The film stars Vishnuvardhan, Jayanthi, Jayamala and Ashalatha. The film has musical score by M. Ranga Rao.

== Cast ==
- Vishnuvardhan as Kumar and Shivamurthy
- Jayanthi as Girija
- Jayamala as Sudha
- Ashalatha as Shashi
- Dheerendra Gopal as Gajendra
- Chandrashekar as Chandru
- Musuri Krishnamurthy as Nanjanna
- Somu
- Vijai
- Jaggu
- Ravivarma
- Thilak
- V. Ramachandru
- J. L. Manjunath
- Dr. Muniyappa
- Surendranath
- M. S. Karanth
- Muddu Mallappa
- Shashikala
- Jayasheela
- Halam
- Lavanya
- Nirmala
- Lakshmi
- Sarala
- Merlin
- Srirekha
- Yashodha
- Master Ravi
- Baby Sangeetha
- Baby Meena
- Dinesh in Special Appearance
- Tiger Prabhakar in Special Appearance as Gajendra's henchman
- Shakti Prasad in Special Appearance
- Saikumar in Special Appearance

== Soundtrack ==
The music was composed by M. Ranga Rao.

No.	Song	Singers	Lyrics	Length (m:ss)
1	"Chimmithu"	S. P. Balasubrahmanyam, Vani Jairam	Vijaya Narasimha	04:45
2	"Olavina"	P. Susheela, K. J. Yesudas	Vijaya Narasimha	04:35
3	"Nammee Baale"	K. J. Yesudas, Bangalore Latha	Vijaya Narasimha	04:37
4	"Naguvude Swarga"	K. J. Yesudas	Chi. Udaya Shankar	03:49
5	"Naguvude"	Vishnuvardhan, S. Janaki	Chi. Udaya Shankar	04:26
