= Mane Belagida Sose =

- Directed by: Srikanth
- Produced by: L V Prasad
- Starring: Vishnuvardhan; Aarathi; Bharathi; Ramgopal
- Cinematography: S J Thomas
- Music by: Vijaya Bhaskar
- Release date: 1973
- Country: India
- Language: Kannada

Mane Belagida Sose is a 1973 Indian Kannada-language film. The film stars Vishnuvardhan, Aarathi, Bharathi and Ramgopal. The film's musical score is by Vijaya Bhaskar.

== Cast ==
- Vishnuvardhan as Gopi
- Ramgopal as Raju
- Dwarakish
- T. N. Balakrishna
- Ranga as Ramanna
- Sampath
- Loknath
- Thipatur Siddaramaiah
- Bharathi Vishnuvardhan as Radha
- Aarathi as Leela
- Kala
- B. Ramadevi

== Soundtrack ==
Tracklist
| No. | Title | Lyrics | Singer(s) | Length |
|---|---|---|---|---|
| 1. | "Olava Raviye Nee Moodi Baa" | Vijayanarasimha | Vani Jayaram |
| 2. | "Baa Baara Nageya Thara" | Vijayanarasimha | Vani Jayaram |
| 3. | "Mohananga Ninna Sanga" | Hunsur Krishnamurthy | Vani Jayaram |
| 4. | "Anda Chanda Thumbi Banda" | Hunsur Krishnamurthy | P. B. Srinivas, S. Janaki |
| 5. | "Namaskara O Geleya" | | S.P. Balasubrahmanyam, S. Janaki |
