= Maha Prachandaru =

- Directed by: Joe Simon
- Written by: Kunigal Nagabhushan (dialogues)
- Screenplay by: Joe Simon; Kunigal Nagabhushan
- Story by: Vijaya Sasanur – Vigraha Choraru
- Produced by: R. Thimmaiah; M. Krishna; Revanna; Shantha S. Karmore
- Starring: Vishnuvardhan; Ambareesh; Kumari Vinaya; Halam
- Cinematography: H. G. Raju
- Edited by: P. Venkateshwara Rao
- Music by: Upendra Kumar
- Production company: Sri Adishakthi Combines
- Distributed by: Sri Adishakthi Combines
- Release date: 13 July 1981
- Running time: 137 min
- Country: India
- Language: Kannada

Maha Prachandaru is a 1981 Indian Kannada-language heist film, directed by Joe Simon and produced by R. Thimmaiah, M. Krishna, Revanna and Shantha S. Karmore. The film stars Vishnuvardhan, Ambareesh, Kumari Vinaya and Halam in lead roles. The film had musical score by Upendra Kumar. The movie is based on novel Vigraha Choraru by Vijay Sasanur. The concept of the movie was later used in the 2008 film Navagraha.

== Plot ==
In the movie, a gang who specialize in stealing idols try to involve Vishnuvarshan in their crime but he gives the idol back to the temple from which they stole it after plotting for a long time. The final fight between themselves sees Vishnuvardhan going back to the temple head's daughter who is a worshipper of the temple God. She would have died due to his betrayal but his love for her was real. Ambareesh (her brother) arrests Vishnuvardhan who accepts it as he is guilty of betraying her more than he is of stealing the idol.

== Cast ==
- Vishnuvardhan as Natraj
- Ambareesh as Ajith
- Kumari Vinaya as Sharada
- Halam
- Tiger Prabhakar as Mohan
- Sudheer
- Dinesh
- Musuri Krishnamurthy
- Chethan Ramrao as Dharmadarshi
- Hanumanthachar as Sheshachari
- Bangalore Nagesh as PC Govindappa
- Jr. Narasimharaju as PC
- Mysore Lokesh as PC
- Thipatur Siddaramaiah
- Kunigal Ramanath

== Soundtrack ==
The music was composed by Upendra Kumar.

Songs
No.	Title	Playback	Length
1.	"Baayalli Neerooride"	S. P. Balasubrahmanyam, Vani Jairam	4:37
2.	"Naa Ninna Kandaga"	S. P. Balasubrahmanyam	4:32
3.	"Shileyallu"	S. Janaki	5:05
4.	"Suralokada"	S. Janaki, P. B. Sreenivas	4:59
