= Madhuve Madu Tamashe Nodu =

1984 film

Maduve Madu Thamashe Nodu
- Directed by: Sathya
- Written by: Chi. Udaya Shankar
- Based on: Dowry Kalyanam (Tamil)(1983) by Visu
- Produced by: Dwarakish
- Starring: Vishnuvardhan; Aarathi; Dwarkish; Jai Jagadish
- Cinematography: B. S. Basavaraj
- Edited by: Gowtham Raju
- Music by: Vijayanand
- Production company: Dwarakish Chithra
- Distributed by: Dwarakish Chithra
- Release date: 22 December 1984
- Running time: 138 minutes
- Country: India
- Language: Kannada

Maduve Madu Thamashe Nodu ( transl. Get married, see the fun) is a 1984 Indian Kannada-language film, directed by Sathya and produced by Dwarakish. The film stars Vishnuvardhan, Aarathi, Dwarkish, Mahalakshmi and Jai Jagadish. The film is a remake of Tamil film Dowry Kalyanam (1983).

== Plot ==
The movie revolves around the herculian effort of a middle-class family man and his wife in arranging the marriage of his sister, and getting a job for his younger brother. Vishnuvardhan plays the main lead of Ganesha, Aarthi plays his wife Uma, Mahalakshmi plays the role of the sister Gowri and Dwarkish plays her groom. The film deals with the exploitation of parents of the bride in the name of dowry.

== Cast ==
- Vishnuvardhan as Ganesha
- Aarathi as Uma
- Dwarkish as Mohan
- Jai Jagadish as Raja
- Mahalakshmi as Gowri
- Srinivasa Murthy as DIG Kuchela (Special Appearance)
- C. R. Simha as Kuchela (Special Appearance)
- Vajramuni as Rahim (Special Appearance)
- Silk Smitha as Rahim's Relative (Special Appearance)
- Sundar Raj in Special Appearance as thief
- Balakrishna as Neelakhantha Shastri
- Lokanath as Jalendar Subbu
- Shivaram as Gundu Rao
- Leelavathi
- Kanchana as Raja's mother
- Uma Shivakumar as Rushyendramani

== Soundtrack ==
The music was composed by Vijay Anand.

Song	Singers	Lyrics	Length (m:ss)
"Santhoshada"	S. Janaki, S. P. Balasubrahmanyam	R. N. Jayagopal	04:51
"Naanu Neenu"	S. P. Balasubrahmanyam, Manjula	R. N. Jayagopal	04:35
"Maduve Hennige"	K. J. Yesudas	Chi. Udaya Shankar	04:50
