= Kalluveene Nudiyithu =

1983 Indian film directed by Thiptur Raghu

- Directed by: Thipatur Raghu
- Written by: Somu (dialogues)
- Screenplay by: Thipatur Raghu
- Story by: Tha Pu Venkataram
- Produced by: Smt Kalpana Pandu
- Starring: Vishnuvardhan; Aarathi
- Cinematography: Benjamin
- Edited by: P. Venkateshwara Rao
- Music by: M. Ranga Rao
- Production company: Thripura Art Productions
- Distributed by: Thripura Art Productions
- Release date: 6 April 1983
- Running time: 136 minutes
- Country: India
- Language: Kannada

Kalluveene Nudiyithu is a 1983 Indian Kannada-language film, directed by Thipatur Raghu and produced by Smt Kalpana Pandu. The film stars Vishnuvardhan in a double role. The musical score was composed by M. Ranga Rao.

== Cast ==
- Vishnuvardhan (Double role)
- Aarathi
- Jayanthi
- Padmapriya
- Udaykumar
- Chandrashekar
- Jai Jagadish
- Bhavya
- Dinesh
- Shakti Prasad
- Dheerendra Gopal
- Shashikala
- Prashanthi
- Mamatha
- M. S. Umesh
- M. S. Karanth
- Jr. Narasimharaju
- Aravind

== Soundtrack ==
The music was composed by M. Ranga Rao.

| No. | Song | Singers | Lyrics | Length (m:ss) |
|---|---|---|---|---|
| 1 | "Hennu Kannina" | Vishnuvardhan, Vani Jairam | R. N. Jayagopal | |
| 2 | "Nanna Devana Veena Vaadana" | Vani Jairam | Vijaya Narasimha | |
| 3 | "Ee Sarigamada" | S. P. Balasubrahmanyam, Bangalore Latha | Vijaya Narasimha | |
| 4 | "Olavina Jodi" | Vani Jairam, Vishnuvardhan | Vijaya Narasimha | |
