= Adalu Badalu =

1979 film directed by C. V. Rajendran

- Directed by: C. V. Rajendran
- Written by: Chi. Udaya Shankar; Shanmukhapriya; C. V. Rajendran
- Produced by: P. Krishnaraj
- Starring: Srinath; Aarathi; M. P. Shankar; Dwarakish
- Cinematography: R. Madhusudan
- Edited by: Yadav Victor
- Music by: Vijaya Bhaskar
- Production company: Mohan Murali Productions
- Distributed by: Mohan Murali Productions
- Release date: 12 March 1979
- Running time: 134 minutes
- Country: India
- Language: Kannada

Adalu Badalu is a 1979 Indian Kannada-language action film directed by C. V. Rajendran and written by Shanmukhapriya. The film stars Srinath, Aarathi, M. P. Shankar and Dwarakish. The soundtrack and background score were composed by Vijaya Bhaskar, while the cinematography and editing were handled by R. Madhusudan and Yadav Victor. The dialogues were written by Chi. Udaya Shankar.

== Premise ==
Inspector Murali is assigned to track down and arrest a smuggler named Bairaa, where he disguise himself as a diamond merchant to nab him, only to get killed by Bairaa as the latter knew about his identity. Due to this, Murali's brother Inspector Mohan takes up the case in order to seek vengeance for Murali's death.

== Cast ==
- Srinath as Inspector Mohan
- Aarathi as Radha
- M. P. Shankar as Bairaa
- Dwarakish as L.T.V. Prasanna
- Halam
- Lokanath
- Baby Rekha

=== Cameo appearance ===
- Manjula
- Lokesh as Inspector Murali

== Soundtrack ==
The music for the soundtrack was composed by Vijaya Bhaskar.

Track listing
No.	Title	Lyrics	Singer(s)	Length
1.	"Nalidide Jeevana Ganga"	Vijaya Narasimha	S. P. Balasubrahmanyam, Vani Jairam
2.	"Baa Sukhava Pade"	Chi. Udaya Shankar	Vani Jairam
3.	"Prayada Vayasige"	Doddarange Gowda	S. P. Balasubrahmanyam, S. Janaki
4.	"Nalidide Jeevana Ganga"	Vijaya Narasimha	S. P. Balasubrahmanyam
