= Mutthaide Bhagya (1983 film) =

- Directed by: K. N. Chandrashekar Sharma
- Written by: Chi. Udaya Shankar (dialogues)
- Screenplay by: K. N. Chandrashekar Sharma
- Produced by: B. V. Radha
- Starring: Tiger Prabhakar; Aarathi; Chandrashekar; Sundar Raj
- Cinematography: N. K. Sathish
- Edited by: Yadav Victor
- Music by: Vijaya Bhaskar
- Production company: Radha Ravi Chithra
- Distributed by: Radha Ravi Chithra
- Release date: 18 August 1983
- Running time: 119 min
- Country: India
- Language: Kannada

Mutthaide Bhagya (Kannada: ಮುತ್ತೈದೆ ಭಾಗ್ಯ) is a 1983 Indian Kannada film, directed by K. N. Chandrashekar Sharma and produced by B. V. Radha. The film stars Tiger Prabhakar, Aarathi, Chandrashekar and Sundar Raj in the lead roles. This movie is a remake of Telugu movie Pratheekaaram (1982), in which Sobhan Babu played dual roles. The film has musical score by Vijaya Bhaskar.

== Cast ==
- Tiger Prabhakar as Rajashekar
- Aarathi as Seetha
- Vishnuvardhan in Guest appearance
- Chandrashekar
- Sundar Raj
- Pramila Joshai
- Vajramuni as Alexander
- Sudheer as Benki Beerappa
- Jayamalini as Kamini
- Vijay Rangaraju
- Kumari Manjula Sharma
- Master Sanjay
