= Pedda Gedda =

- Directed by: H. R. Bhargava
- Written by: Chakravarthy; Chi. Udaya Shankar (Dialogue)
- Screenplay by: Chakravarthy
- Produced by: Dwarakish
- Starring: Dwarakish; Aarathi; Jayamala; Sundar Krishna Urs
- Cinematography: D. V. Rajaram
- Edited by: Yadav Victor
- Music by: K. V. Mahadevan
- Production company: Dwarakish Chithra
- Distributed by: Dwarakish Chithra
- Release date: 31 December 1981
- Running time: 132 min
- Country: India
- Language: Kannada

Pedda Gedda is a 1982 Indian Kannada-language film, directed by H. R. Bhargava and produced by Dwarakish. The film stars Aarathi, Dwarakish and Jayamala in key roles. The film has musical score by K. V. Mahadevan.

== Plot ==
A mentally underdeveloped individual is the sole heir to a vast inheritance. Cunning family members scheme to assassinate him. A psychology graduate enters to reform him.

== Cast ==
- Aarathi
- Dwarakish
- Jayamala
- Vishnuvardhan in Guest Appearance
- Bharathi Vishnuvardhan in Guest Appearance
- Madhu Malini
- Sundar Krishna Urs
- Kanchana
- Sundar Raj
- Rathnakar
- Bangalore Nagesh
- Rajanand
- Lokanath
- Thai Nagesh
- Hanumanthachar
- Chethan Ramarao

== Soundtrack ==
Pedda Gedda

Soundtrack album by K. V. Mahadevan
- Released: 1982
- Genre: Feature film soundtrack
- Label: Sangeetha Musics

The music was composed by K. V. Mahadevan.

No.	Song	Singers	Lyrics	Length (m:ss)
1	"Swaagatha Suswaagatha"	S. Janaki	Chi. Udaya Shankar	04:29
2	"Ee Pedda Gedda"	S. Janaki, S. P. Balasubrahmanyam	Chi. Udaya Shankar	04:31
3	"Arivanu Koduvalu"	S. P. Balasubrahmanyam, S. Janaki	Chi. Udaya Shankar	03:46
4	"Naguvudanu Kalithavane"	S. P. Balasubrahmanyam	Chi. Udaya Shankar	04:31
5	"Bere Aase Yeke"	S. Janaki	Chi. Udaya Shankar	04:15
6	"Huttida Habba"	S. P. Balasubrahmanyam	Chi. Udaya Shankar	04:08
