= Swabhimana =

- Directed by: D. Rajendra Babu
- Screenplay by: D. Rajendra Babu
- Story by: K. S. Satyanarayana
- Produced by: B. N. Gangadhar
- Starring: Tiger Prabhakar; Aarathi; V. Ravichandran; Mahalakshmi; Sujaya
- Cinematography: D. Prasad Babu
- Edited by: K. Balu
- Music by: Shankar–Ganesh
- Production company: A N S Productions
- Release date: 1985
- Running time: 135 minutes
- Country: India
- Language: Kannada

Swabhimana (transl. Self-respect) is a 1985 Kannada-language romantic drama film directed by D. Rajendra Babu and written by K. S. Satyanarayan. The film stars V. Ravichandran and Mahalakshmi with Tiger Prabhakar and Aarathi in extended guest appearances. The soundtrack and score composition was by Shankar–Ganesh and the film was produced by B. N. Gangadhar.

== Cast ==
- V. Ravichandran as Vijay
- Tiger Prabhakar as Anand
- Aarathi as Nirmala
- Mahalakshmi as Vani
- Mukhyamantri Chandru as Lakshmipathi
- Umashree
- Balakrishna
- N. S. Rao
- Shivaram
- Shanthamma
- Sujaya

== Soundtrack ==
The music was composed by Shankar–Ganesh, with lyrics by R. N. Jayagopal. The song "Doorada Oorinda Hammeera Banda" was received extremely well and considered one of the evergreen songs. Jayagopal won the Karnataka State Film Award for Best Lyricist for this song.

Track listing
| No. | Title | Lyrics | Singer(s) | Length |
|---|---|---|---|---|
| 1. | "Doorada Oorinda Hammera Banda" | R. N. Jayagopal | S. P. Balasubrahmanyam, S. Janaki |
| 2. | "Ondu Eradu Mooru Beke" | R. N. Jayagopal | S. P. Balasubrahmanyam, S. Janaki |
| 3. | "Baruvaaga Onti Neenu" | R. N. Jayagopal | Rajkumar Bharathi |
| 4. | "Haalu Jenu Serida Hange" | R. N. Jayagopal | Vani Jairam |
