= Aarathi =

Indian actress (born 1954)

- Born: Bharathi; 1954 (age 71–72); Aregallu, (near Kushalanagar), Arakalagudu, Karnataka, India
- Other name: Ranganayaki
- Occupations: Actress, film director
- Years active: 1969–1986; 2005
- Spouses: Puttanna Kanagal (divorced): Chandrashekar Desaigoudar
- Children: 2

Member of the Karnataka Legislative Council
- In office 1984–1990

Aarathi (born as Bharathi in 1954) is a former Indian actress and director who prominently worked in Kannada films during the 1970s and 1980s. Her accolades include four Karnataka State Film Awards and four Filmfare Awards. She was one of the most successful and versalite heroines of Kannada films during seventies and eighties. Aarathi has also appeared in a few Tamil, Telugu and Malayalam films.

Aarathi made her acting debut with Kannada film Gejje Pooje (1969), playing a supporting role. She rose to prominence through her collaborations with Kannada filmmaker Puttanna Kanagal in the novel adaptation of heroine-oriented dramas like Upasane (1974), Shubhamangala (1975), Bili Hendthi (1975), Dharmasere (1979) and Ranganayaki (1981). She received widespread critical acclaim for the social superhit Naagarahaavu (1972), for which she won her first Karnataka State Film Award for Best Actress. A few of her other notable roles include Bangaarada Panjara (1974), Daari Tappida Maga (1975), Katha Sangama (1976), Premada Kanike (1976) and Hombisilu (1978).

In 1985 she was nominated as a Member of the Legislative Council of the Vidhana parishad, making her only the second actress after B. Jayamma to receive this honor. In 1986 she directed 13 episodes of Bangalore DD serial Namma Nammalli. Following her marriage (1986-87) she retired from the limelight. She made a comeback in 2005 as director with the film Mithayi Mane which was met with critical appreciation and also won the Karnataka State Film Award for Best Children's Film.

== Career ==
=== Beginnings and breakthrough ===
Aarathi made her film debut with the film Gejje Pooje (1969) directed by Puttanna Kanagal playing the sister of hero Gangadhar. Her first lead role was in the Samiulla directed comedy film, Takka Bitre Sikka (1970), where she played the love interest of Srinath. She featured in supporting roles in several Rajkumar starrers Kasturi Nivasa (1971), Sri Krishna Rukmini Satyabhama (1971), Nyayave Devaru (1971) and Bangarada Manushya (1972) and went on to play his heroine in Sipayi Ramu (1972), Bhale Huchcha (1972), Bangaarada Panjara (1974), Bahaddur Gandu (1976), Premada Kanike (1976) and Raja Nanna Raja (1976) .

Another major breakthrough was in 1972 when Puttanna Kanagal cast her as Alamelu in Naagarahaavu (1972). She gained widespread recognition and accolades for playing a soft spoken girl whos life ends up in tragic circumstances post marriage and also won her first Karnataka State Film Award. Vishnuvardhan made his debut with this film and gained instant popularity and the pair went on to star in several successful films together over the next decade. Naagarahaavu ran for over 25 weeks across Karnataka and was remade in several other languages and firmly established her as one of the top heroines.

=== Collaboration with Puttanna Kanagal ===
Kanagal offered her to star in his films back to back right from Gejje Pooje in 1970 up until their final association in Ranganayaki in 1981. During the making of Bili Hendthi (1975), the duo secretly married even though Kanagal was already married. Kanagal wrote several author-backed character roles for Aarathi and cast her in female-centric films. Their combination produced successful films such as Naagarahaavu (1972), Edakallu Guddada Mele (1973), Upasane (1974), Bili Hendthi (1975), Shubhamangala (1975), Paduvaaralli Pandavaru (1978), Dharmasere (1979) and Ranganayaki (1981). They did not collaborate in films after Ranganayaki, due to their separation. Aarathi won all her eight awards (four Karnataka State awards and four Filmfare South awards) for movies directed by Kanagal.

=== Widespread success and retirement ===
Besides her successful films with Kanagal, Aarathi found success in all her collaborations with top actors Rajkumar, Vishnuvardhan, Srinath, Ashok, Ambareesh, Anant Nag and Tiger Prabhakar. Starting from the supporting role in magnum opus Kasturi Nivasa (1971), she was repeatedly cast opposite Rajkumar in as many as 12 films which were successful at the box-office and critically acclaimed. Her most successful pairing was with Vishnuvardhan with whom she worked in 16-17 films including Hanthakana Sanchu (1980), Bangarada Jinke (1980), Pedda Gedda (1982), Kalluveene Nudiyithu (1983), Khaidi (1984) and Madhuve Madu Tamashe Nodu (1986).

Aarathi featured in several female-centered films by other top directors like Mahathyaga (1974), Hombisilu (1978), Manini (1979), Vasantha Lakshmi (1978), Anurakthe (1980), Nyaya Ellide, Mullina Gulabi, Archana, Kannu Theresida Hennu (1982), Samarpane (1983) and Sati Sakkubai (1985). She retired from acting after her second marriage in 1986 and Tiger was her last film to release.

== Filmography ==
=== Director ===
Year	Title	Notes
1986	Namma Nammalli	Bangalore DD serial
2005	Mithayi Mane	Karnataka State Film Award for Best Children Film

=== Actress-Kannada films ===
Year	Title	Role	Notes
1969	Gejje Pooje	Lalitha	
1970	Kallara Kalla	Malli	
1970	Takka Bitre Sikka	Jayanthi	
1971	Anugraha	Gowri	
1971	Pratidwani	Usha	
1971	Sri Krishna Rukmini Satyabhama	Jambavathi	
1971	Kasturi Nivasa	Lakshmi	Special appearance
1971	Nyayave Devaru	Lalitha	Special appearance
1972	Sipayi Ramu	Champa	
1972	Bangarada Manushya	Sharavati	
1972	Bhale Huchcha	Chandra	
1972	Naagarahaavu	Alamelu	Karnataka State Film Award for Best Actress
1973	Mane Belagida Sose	Leela	
1973	Edakallu Guddada Mele	Devaki	Karnataka State Film Award for Best Supporting Actress
1973	Mooroovare Vajragalu	Rukmini	
1973	Mannina Magalu	Sundari	
1974	Bangaarada Panjara	Mallamma	
1974	Upasane	Sharada	Filmfare Award for Best Actress – Kannada
1974	Maha Thyaga	Dr. Saroja	
1974	Nanu Baalabeku	Prabha	
1974	Bhale Bhatta		
1975	Daari Tappida Maga	Radha Devi	
1975	Shubhamangala	Hema	Filmfare Award for Best Actress – Kannada
1975	Bili Hendthi	Sharada	
1975	Devara Kannu	Sandhya	
1976	Katha Sangama	Munithayi	Karnataka State Film Award for Best Actress
1976	Hosilu Mettida Hennu		
1976	Premada Kanike	Seetha	
1976	Punardatta	Padmini	
1976	Bahaddur Gandu	Radha	
1976	Raja Nanna Raja	Ganga/Geetha	
1976	Baalu Jenu	Geetha	
1976	Phalitamsha	Sheela	
1976	Aparadhi	Usha	
1977	Maagiya Kanasu	Radha	
1977	Pavana Ganga	Ganga	
1977	Anuroopa	Asha	
1978	Kudure Mukha	Rekha	
1978	Hombisilu	Dr. Roopa	
1978	Maathu Tappada Maga	Revathi	
1978	Muyyige Muyyi	Uma	
1978	Paduvaaralli Pandavaru	Journalist	Extended Special appearance
1978	Anuraga Bandhana		
1978	Premayana	Pammi	
1978	Vasantha Lakshmi	Vasantha	
1978	Balu Aparoopa Nam Jodi	Suji	
1979	Dharmasere	Tunga	Filmfare Award for Best Actress – Kannada; Karnataka State Film Award for Best Actress
1979	Adalu Badalu	Radha	
1979	Naniruvude Ninagagi	Sarasa	
1979	Manini	Hema / Prema	
1979	Nentaro Gantu Kallaro	Shobha	
1980	Bhaktha Siriyala	Mangala	
1980	Hanthakana Sanchu	Anita	
1980	Bangarada Jinke	Asha	
1980	Nyaya Neethi Dharma	Revathi	
1980	Anurakthe	Sumi	
1981	Ranganayaki	Ranganayaki/ Mala	Filmfare Award for Best Actress – Kannada; Karnataka State Film Award for Best Actress
1981	Thayiya Madilalli	Ganga	
1981	Naari Swargakke Daari	Seetha	
1981	Ganesha Mahime	Saraswati	
1981	Bhagyavantha	Seeta	
1981	Chadurida Chitragalu	Ganga	
1981	Bhagyada Belaku	Janaki	
1981	Edeyuru Siddalingeshwara	Basamma	
1981	Preethisi Nodu	Madhu	
1981	Pedda Gedda	Jyothi	
1982	Archana	Archana	
1982	Mullina Gulabi	Mala	
1982	Karmika Kallanalla	Lakshmi	
1982	Mava Sose Saval	Radha	
1982	Parajitha	Dr. Rani	
1982	Nyaya Ellide	Inspector Durga	
1982	Kannu Terasida Hennu	Arundhati	
1982	Suvarna Sethuve	Saroja Teacher	
1982	Hasyaratna Ramakrishna	Kamala	
1982	Raja Maharaja		
1983	Tirugu Baana	Saroja	
1983	Gedda Maga	Sheela	
1983	Jaggu	Roopa/Mother	
1983	Nyaya Gedditu	Geetha	Special appearance
1983	Kalluveene Nudiyithu	Prapulla	
1983	Thayiya Nudi	Annapoorna	
1983	Sididedda Sahodara	Latha	
1983	Kranthiyogi Basavanna	Gangambike	
1983	Ananda Sagara	Shanthi	
1983	Gandharvagiri	Netravati	
1983	Mutthaide Bhagya	Seetha	
1983	Aakrosha	Shobha	
1983	Chalisada Sagara		
1983	Samarpane	Sarala	
1984	Kaliyuga	Parvathi	
1984	Khaidi	Dr. Sujata	
1984	Pooja Phala		
1984	Premave Balina Belaku	Vanaja	
1984	Hennina Saubhagya	Dr. Vatsala	
1984	Bekkina Kannu		
1984	Ramapurada Ravana	Seetha	
1984	Pavitra Prema	Shylaja	
1984	Ajnathavasa	Saroja	
1984	Preethi Vathsalya	Lawyer Saroja	
1984	Madhuve Madu Tamashe Nodu	Uma	
1984	Avala Antaranga		Special appearance
1984	Bilee Gulabi		Special appearance
1985	Kuridoddi Kurukshetra		
1985	Nee Nakkaga		
1985	Sati Sakkubai	Sakkubai & Krishna's incarnate	
1985	Lakshmi Kataksha	Padmavathi	
1985	Haavu Eni Aata	Suma	
1985	Kumkuma Thanda Saubhagya	Lakshmi	
1985	Shiva Kotta Sowbhagya	Princess Ratna	
1985	Thulasi Dala	Sharada	
1985	Swabhimana	Nirmala	Special appearance
1985	Vajra Mushti	Bharati	Special appearance
1986	Bettada Thayi	Parvathi	
1986	Seelu Nakshatra	Sharvari	
1986	Tiger	Aruna	
1986	Sedina Daaha	Asha	Unreleased film

=== Actress-Other languages ===
Year	Title	Role	Language
1970	Inti Gowravam		Telugu
1971	Makane Ninakku Vendi	Sophia	Malayalam
1972	Ooriki Upakari		Telugu
1972	Kula Gowravam	Radha	Telugu
1974	Gumasthavin Magal	Seetha	Tamil
