= Mazhalai Pattalam =

- Poster of Mazhalai Pattalam
- Directed by: Lakshmi
- Written by: Visu (Tamil dialogues); D. Rajendra Babu (Kannada dialogues)
- Produced by: P. R. Govindaraj; B. Doraiswamy
- Starring: Vishnuvardhan; Sumithra
- Cinematography: N. Balakrishnan; R. Raghunatha Reddy
- Edited by: N. R. Kittu
- Music by: M. S. Viswanathan
- Production company: Kalaikoodam
- Release dates: 9 May 1980 (Tamil); 21 July 1980 (Kannada)
- Running time: 130 minutes
- Country: India
- Languages: Tamil; Kannada

Mazhalai Pattalam (pronounced [maɻalaɪ paʈʈːaːɭam] transl. Army of Children) is a 1980 Indian Tamil-language children's film simultaneously filmed in Kannada as Makkala Sainya ( transl. Army of Children). The directorial debut of Lakshmi, it stars Vishnuvardhan and Sumithra. The story is based on the 1968 American film Yours, Mine and Ours. Mazhalai Pattalam was released on 9 May 1980, and Makkala Sainya on 21 July that year. The film was remade in Telugu as Ramadandu (1981).

== Plot ==
The film is a love story of the hero, taking care of his six children and the heroine, taking care of her late sister's five orphaned children. The children, who are always at loggerheads, make their marriage an impossibility until they are forced to join forces.

== Cast ==
- Vishnuvardhan as Shivaraman alias Gowri Manohari
- Sumithra as Uma
- Shivaram
- M. N. Lakshmi Devi (Kannada version)
- M. S. Sundari Bai as Kamakshi (Tamil version)
- Poornam Viswanathan as Shivaraman's boss
- Baby Poorani
- Baby Indira

== Production ==
The film, announced in 1979, is the directorial debut of Lakshmi, who was supervised by K. Balachander. The story is based on the 1968 film Yours, Mine and Ours. When Balachander approached Visu to write the screenplay and dialogues, he left his job at a travel company and agreed to write the screenplay while also taking care of post-production activities as per Balachander's request.

== Soundtrack ==
The soundtrack was composed by M. S. Viswanathan. The song "Gowri Manohari" is based on Gourimanohari raga. The song was named after Gowri Manohari, a character from the film.

All lyrics are written by Kannadasan.

Tamil
No.	Title	Singer(s)	Length
1.	"Enga Pillai"	S. P. Balasubrahmanyam, B. S. Sasirekha
2.	"Thallu Model Vandi"	S. P. Balasubrahmanyam and chorus
3.	"Gowri Manohari"	S. P. Balasubrahmanyam, Vani Jairam
4.	"Gumthalakkadi Gumma"	Master Raj, T. K. Kala, L. R. Anjali, B. S. Sasirekha and S. P. Sailaja

All lyrics are written by R. N. Jayagopal.

Kannada
No.	Title	Singer(s)	Length
1.	"Gowri Manohari"	S. P. Balasubrahmanyam, Vani Jairam
2.	"Thallo Model"	S. P. Balasubrahmanyam and chorus
3.	"Mutthinantha"	S. P. Balasubrahmanyam and B. S. Sasirekha
4.	"Dhimma Thakka Dhimmi"	Master Raj, T. K. Kala, L. R. Anjali, S. P. Sailaja and B. S. Sasirekha

== Release and reception ==
Mazhalai Pattalam was released on 9 May 1980, and Makkala Sainya on 21 July that year. Kanthan of Kalki wrote that Lakshmi's direction in her debut did not speak; however her experienced maturity was evident. The film opened to a poor response, but picked up by the eighth week and became a success.
