= Hombisilu =

1978 Kannada film directed by Geethapriya

- Lobby card
- Directed by: Geethapriya
- Written by: Usha Navarathnaram
- Produced by: B. S. Somasundar; Sampath Raj
- Starring: Vishnuvardhan; Aarathi; Vaishali Kasaravalli; Shivaram
- Cinematography: S. Ramachandra
- Edited by: Bal G. Yadav; N. M. Victor
- Music by: Rajan–Nagendra
- Production company: Nirupama Movies
- Release date: 1978
- Running time: 138 minutes
- Country: India
- Language: Kannada

Hombisilu ( transl. Golden sunlight) is a 1978 Indian Kannada-language romantic drama film directed by Geethapriya. It is based on the novel of the same name by famous Kannada author Usha Navarathnaram. The film starred Vishnuvardhan, Aarathi and Leelavathi. Vishnuvardhan was awarded with Karnataka State Film Award for Best Actor for his performance in this film. The film was a musical blockbuster with all the songs composed by Rajan–Nagendra considered evergreen hits.

== Synopsis ==
Dr. Nataraj (Vishnuvardhan) is desperately seeking a lady doctor for his nursing home. His aunt (Leelavathi) introduces him to her assistant, Dr. Roopa (Aarathi) who falls in love with him at first sight but is disappointed to know that he is only looking for a female assistant doctor. While family pressures force her to marry him, she refuses to consummate the marriage because of her grudge against him.

Circumstances introduce another young woman Vasanthi (Vaishali Kasaravalli) as a second lady doctor in Nataraj's nursing home. The glamorous Vasanthi is more interested in the good looking Nataraj rather than her duty as a doctor. This deepens the rift between Nataraj and Roopa. How the differences are resolved for a happy ending forms the rest of the movie, set against the backdrop of the nursing home.

The film is based on the debut novel of famous Kannada author Usha Navaratnaram. Usha's novels mainly focussed on the problems of working women in the male dominated world. Two of Usha's novels with a female doctor as the center character - Hombisilu and Bandhana have been made into films. Vishnuvardhan featured as the male lead in both. Despite the female-centric themes, Vishnuvardhan did hold his own against the indomitable heroines - Aarathi in Hombisilu and Suhasini in Bandhana - who were considered his equals in the craft - and impressed the intelligent Kannada audience. The two films fetched him his two state awards.

== Cast ==
- Vishnuvardhan as Dr. Nataraj
- Aarathi as Dr. Roopa
- Vaishali Kasaravalli as Dr.Vasanthi
- Leelavathi as Dr.Kamalamma
- Uma Shivakumar as Raji
- Shivaram as Dr. Srinath
- N. S. Rao as Ranga
- Shakti Prasad as Rangappa

== Soundtrack ==
The music was composed by Rajan–Nagendra. All the songs composed for the film were received extremely well and considered as evergreen songs. Rajan–Nagendra reused the song Jeeva Veene in the 1979 Telugu movie Intinti Ramayanam as Veena Venuvaina Sarigama and in its Tamil remake Veettukku Veedu Vasappadi as Aadal Paadal Kaadhal Enbathu Appodhu.

Track listing
No.	Title	Lyrics	Singer(s)	Length
1.	"Jeeva Veene"	Geethapriya	S. P. Balasubrahmanyam, S. Janaki
2.	"Hoovinda Hoovige"	Geethapriya	S. Janaki
3.	"Maagiya Chaliyalli"	R. N. Jayagopal	S. P. Balasubrahmanyam, S. Janaki
4.	"Neera Bittu Nelada Mele"	Geethapriya	S. P. Balasubrahmanyam

== Awards ==
- 1977–78 - Karnataka State Film Award for Best Actor - Vishnuvardhan
