= Preethisi Nodu =

- Directed by: Geethapriya
- Written by: Geethapriya
- Story by: Usha Navarathnaram
- Based on: Preethisi Nodu by Usha Navarathnaram
- Produced by: M. K. Balaji Singh; N. Sukumar; Indira Srinath
- Starring: Vishnuvardhan; Aarathi; Srinivasa Murthy; Master Naveen
- Cinematography: Kulashekar
- Edited by: K. Balu
- Music by: Vijaya Bhaskar
- Production company: Preethi Chithra
- Distributed by: Preethi Chithra
- Release date: 11 December 1981
- Running time: 137 min
- Country: India
- Language: Kannada

Preethisi Nodu (transl. See with love) is a 1981 Indian Kannada-language film, directed by Geethapriya and produced by M. K. Balaji Singh, N. Summary and Indira Srinath. The film stars Vishnuvardhan, Aarathi and Srinivasa Murthy. The film has musical score by Vijaya Bhaskar.

== Cast ==
- Vishnuvardhan as Mohan
- Aarathi as Madhu
- Srinivasa Murthy as Murali
- Vijayageetha as Murali wife
- Jai Jagadish as Madan in Guest Appearance
- Swapna as Maithri
- Suneetha
- Prashanthi Nayak
- Dheerendra Gopal as strict traffic police
- Mandeep Roy as Siddhappa
- KV Manjayya
- Sadashiva Brahmavar as Raghupathi
- Hanumanthachar as Seethapathi
- Master Naveen
- Baby Rekha

== Soundtrack ==
The music was composed by Vijayabhaskar.

No.	Song	Singers	Lyrics	Length (m:ss)
1	"Preethisi Nodu"	S. P. Balasubrahmanyam	Geethapriya	04:13
2	"Balli Hoovigaasare"	S. P. Balasubrahmanyam, S. Janaki	Geethapriya	04:37
3	"Prema Vemba Pandyadalli"	S. Janaki	Geethapriya	04:32
4	"Hasive Doora"	S. P. Balasubrahmanyam, P. Padma, Choodamani	Geethapriya	05:09
