= Bhagya Jyothi =

1975 film

- Poster
- Directed by: K. S. L. Swamy
- Written by: Smt. Mangala Sathyan
- Screenplay by: V. Somanathan
- Based on: Novel
- Produced by: Gopal-Lakshman
- Starring: Vishnuvardhan; Bharathi Vishnuvardhan; Shubha; K. S. Ashwath
- Cinematography: B. Purushottham
- Edited by: Bal G. Yadav
- Music by: Vijaya Bhaskar
- Production company: Srinidhi Productions
- Release date: 11 August 1975
- Running time: 166 Min.
- Country: India
- Language: Kannada

Bhagya Jyothi is a 1975 Indian Kannada film, directed by K. S. L. Swamy and produced by Gopal-Lakshman. The movie, based on a novel by Mangala Satyan is a mirror to society's take on the caste system. The film stars Vishnuvardhan, Bharathi Vishnuvardhan and Shubha in the lead roles. The film has musical score by Vijaya Bhaskar. The Sanskrit song 'Divya Gagana Vanavasini' sung by P.B. Srinivas and Vani Jairam and picturized for a sequence from the Kalidasa play 'Vikramorvasheeyam' is a major highlight of the film. This was Bharathi Vishnuvardhan's 100th film.

== Cast ==
- Vishnuvardhan
- Bharathi Vishnuvardhan
- Shubha
- B. Saroja Devi in Special Appearance
- B. V. Radha
- Ambareesh
- K. S. Ashwath
- Leelavathi
- C. H. Lokanath
- Shivaram
- Vedavalli
- Seetharam
- M. N. Babu
- B. Hanumanthachar
- Ashwath Narayan
- Chethan
- Dikki Madhavarao
- Prabhakar
- Puttanna
- Sanjeev
- M. V. V. Swamy
- Sriranga Murthy
- Manmatha Rao
- Vasudev
- Dr. Sridhar
- Master Arun
- P. B. Sreenivas as cameo appearance in song "Divya Gagana Vanavasini"
- Vani Jairam as cameo appearance in song "Divya Gagana Vanavasini"
- Vijaya Bhaskar as cameo appearance in song "Divya Gagana Vanavasini"

== Soundtrack ==
The music was composed by Vijaya Bhaskar.

No.	Song	Singers	Lyrics	Length (m:ss)
1	"Gudi Seradha Mudiyerada"	Kasturi Shankar	Vijaya Narasimha	03:33
2	"Kumkuma Haneyali"	P. B. Sreenivas, Vani Jairam	R. N. Jayagopal	03:21
3	"Divya Gagana Vanvasini"	P. B. Sreenivas, Vani Jairam	P. B. Sreenivas	07:21
4	"Ello neenu noduta naguve"	Kasturi Shankar, Vani Jairam	Chi. Udayshankar	03:29
