= Suvarna Sethuve =

- Directed by: Geethapriya
- Written by: Geethapriya (dialogues)
- Screenplay by: Ma Ra; Geethapriya
- Story by: Suvarna Sethuve by H. G. Radhadevi
- Produced by: B. P. Baliga; B. S. Baliga; B. M. Baliga
- Starring: Vishnuvardhan; Aarathi; Baby Rekha
- Cinematography: Kulashekhar
- Edited by: N. B. Umashankar
- Music by: Vijaya Bhaskar
- Production company: Sri Rajarajeshwari Productions
- Distributed by: Sri Rajarajeshwari Productions
- Release date: 19 June 1982
- Running time: 121 min
- Country: India
- Language: Kannada

Suvarna Sethuve (transl. Golden Bridge) is a 1982 Indian Kannada-language film, directed by Geethapriya and produced by B. P. Baliga, B. S. Baliga and B. M. Baliga. The film stars Vishnuvardhan, Aarathi, Baby Rekha and Dinesh. The musical score was composed by Vijaya Bhaskar. The film was adapted from the novel of the same name by H. G. Radhadevi.

== Cast ==
- Vishnuvardhan
- Aarathi
- Keerthiraj
- Baby Rekha
- Dinesh
- Rajanand
- Seetharam
- Sadashiva Brahmavar
- Dheerendra Gopal in Guest Appearance
- M. S. Umesh

== Soundtrack ==
The music was composed by Vijayabhaskar.

No.	Song	Singers	Lyrics	Length (m:ss)
1	"Venku Chinku"	P. B. Sreenivas, Bangalore Latha	Dodda Range Gowda	04:32
2	"Ninna Konku Notava"	S. P. Balasubrahmanyam, Vani Jairam	Geethapriya	04:25
3	"Savira Hoogalali"	Vani Jairam, Jayachandran	Geethapriya	04:24
4	"Malnadin Moolenaage"	Vani Jairam	Dodda Range Gowda	04:38
