= Kasturi Shankar =

Indian Kannada singer (born 1950)

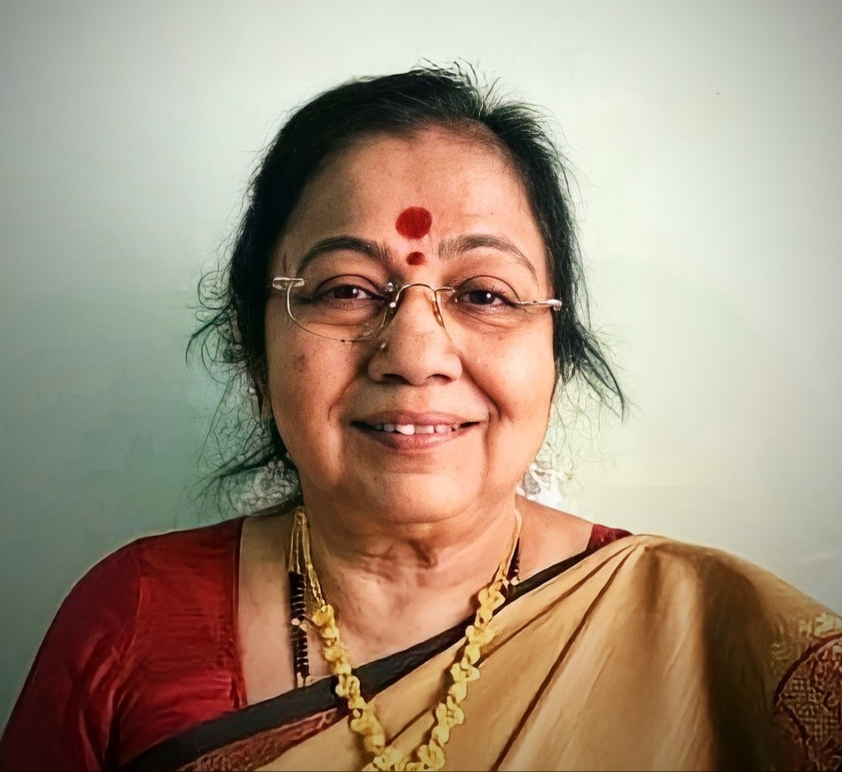

Background information
- Also known as: Kannadada Kogile, Nadamaya Kasturi
- Born: 1 November 1950 (age 75); Mysuru, Karnataka
- Genres: Filmi, Sugama Sangeetha, light music, devotional, folk
- Occupation: playback singer
- Years active: 1962

Kasturi Shankar (Kannada: ಕಸ್ತೂರಿ ಶಂಕರ್) is an Indian singer who sings mainly in Kannada language. She has recorded few films songs in Malayalam and Tulu languages and many non-film songs in Konkani, Tamil, Sanskrit, Telugu and Hindi.

Shankar has sung different kind of songs like film, devotional, Bhaavageethe, classical and folk songs. In her 30 years singing career, Kasturi has worked with a variety of music composers, including T. G. Lingappa, M. Ranga Rao, Vijaya Bhaskar, Rajan–Nagendra, Gunasingh, G. K. Venkatesh and others. She has sung many duets with Dr. Rajkumar, Vani Jairam, Dr. P.B. Srinivas, T. M. Soundararajan, Vishnuvardhan, KJY and with SPB. Kasturi Shankar's popular film songs like Sooryana kanthige (for Padmapriya), Sri tulasi daye thoramma (for Jayanthi), Rangena halliyage (for Aarathi), Sri rama bandavne, Raamanu baralilla made her name popular among listeners.

== Early life ==
Kasturi Shankar was born in Mysuru on 1 November 1950 to Girijamma and J. C. Shankarappa; her father was a freedom fighter. She completed her SSLC and received classical music training for a few years. When Kanagal Prabhakar Shastry recognized her talent, he gave her an opportunity to sing in his film Bettada Gowri. She subsequently worked on many successful films by directors such as Puttanna Kanagal, KSL Swamy, B. S. Ranga, and others. Kasturi married Shankar, and they have two children. The family currently resides in Bangalore.

== Notable songs ==
some of her songs are

- "gudi serada mudiyerada" (Bhagyajyothi)
- "sooryana kanthige" (Thaayige takka maga)
- "rangena halliyage" (Bilee hendthi)
- "raamanu baralilla" (Mithileya seetheyaru)
- "sri rama bandavne" (Paduvaralli panavaru)
- "sri tulasi daye thoramma" (Tulasi)

== Awards ==
Kasturi Shankar has received many awards for her contribution to music. Few are

- Rajyotsava award by Karnataka government
- Atthimabbe award
- Kempegowda Award by BBMP
- Vachana sahitya sree award by Basava sahitya vedike
