= Vijaya Naarasimha =

Indian Kannada lyricist

- Born: 16 January 1927; Halebeedu, Pandavapura taluk, Mysore district, Kingdom of Mysore, British India (now Mandya district, Karnataka, India)
- Died: 31 October 2001 (aged 74); Bengaluru, India
- Occupation: Lyricist
- Spouse: Saraswati
- Family: H. R. Shastry (brother); Anu Prabhakar (great granddaughter)

Vijaya Naarasimha (16 January 1927 – 31 October 2001) was an Indian lyricist who worked in Kannada cinema.

== Career ==
Naarasimha's first Kannada film song was "Yee Dehadinda Dooranaade" (Oh soul, why did you depart this body) for the 1956 film Ohileshwara. He worked with filmmaker Puttanna Kanagal and music director Vijaya Bhaskar.

He worked with major singers and music directors from the 1960s, to the 1980s, including on some Kannada films with Tamil actor Rajinikanth. His last film was Odahuttidavaru. He wrote a Kannada song for a Tamil movie in M. G. Ramachandran's Nadodi Mannan (1958). He was always writing, despite having bad eyesight. According to his family, three days before his death, he was still writing devotional songs on Rama for a cassette. Other than nearly 4,000 film songs, he wrote three novels: Badukina Bairagi, Srimanchakrayana, and Sanjegempu, as well as Puttanna Kanagal's biography and lyrics for many devotional cassettes. His cassette Bhadrapada shuklada chauti sold a record number of copies.

== Filmography ==
- Kallu Sakkare (1967)
- Bevarina Bele (1968)
- Mallammana Pavaada (1969)
- Uyyale (1969)
- Baalu Belagithu (1970)
- Sharapanjara (1971)
- Hrudaya Sangama (1972)
- Naagarahaavu (1972)
- Nanda Gokula (1972)
- Belagidesose (1973)
- Bilee Hendthi (1975)
- Bhagya Jyothi (1975)
- Shubhamangala (1975)
- Katha Sangama (1975)
- Besuge (1976)
- Chiranjeevi (1976)
- Phalithaamsha (1976)
- Teerada Bayake (1976)
- Deepa (1977)
- Adalu Badalu (1978)
- Dharmasere (1979)
- Amrutha Ghalige (1983)
- Aparanji (1983)
- Dharani Mandala Madhyadolage (1983)
- Banker Margayya (1983)
- Akashavani (1985)
- Giri Mallige (1988)
- Bisilu Beladingalu (1988)
- Odahuttidavaru (1994)

== Select discography ==
- "Neene saakida Gini" from Manasasarovara
- "Nannalli Ekinthu Ananda Kaane Manase Nee Balleya Sukhava" from Kallu Sakkare
- "Bharata Bhooshira Mandira Sundari" from Upasane
- "Ee Sambhashane" from Dharmasere
- "Ee Sarigamada Sundari" from Kalluveene Nudiyithu.
- "Hindustanavu Endoo Mareyada" from Amrutha Ghalige
- "Gandarva Giriyali Neevu" from Gandarvagiri
- "Mandara Pushpavu Neenu" from Ranganayaki
- "Masanada Hoovendu" from Masanada Hoovu
- "Mayuri Naatya Mayuri" from Amrutha Ghalige
- "Nammibale Rasamaya Kaavya" from Naga Kala Bhairava
- "O Gunavantha" from Masanada Hoovu
- "Panchama Veda Premada Nada" from Gejje Pooje
- "Viraha Nooru Taraha" from Edakallu Guddada Mele
- "Maguve Ninna Hoo Nage" from Gejje Pooje
- "Rangeri Banthu" from Avala Neralu
