= Musuri Krishnamurthy =

Indian actor, film director and producer

- Born: Krishnamurthy; 10 March 1930
- Died: 16 March 1985 (aged 55)
- Occupation: Actor

Musuri Krishnamurthy (10 March 1930 – 16 March 1985) was an Indian actor, film director, producer, working in Kannada cinema. He was known mostly for his roles as a comedian.

== Early life ==
Krishnamurthy was born on 10 March 1930 to B. S. Vishweshwaraiah and Subbamma. His father, Vishweshwaraiah was a zamindar in Bettadapura, Mysore. As a young boy, Krishnamurthy was drawn towards singing and acting. He exhibited his singing talent during a Ganesh Chaturthi celebrations in front of carnatic vocalist Musiri Subramania Iyer and the then Maharaja of Mysore, Krishna Raja Wadiyar IV. Having been impressed by his performance, the Maharaja compared him to Musiri Subramania Iyer, after which Krishnamurthy was known as Musuri Krishnamurthy to all.

== Career ==
Krishnamurthy made his film debut in the 1943 Kannada film Vani which was also the debut of actress Pandari Bai, who like Krishnamurthy was later considered one of Kannada cinema's finest actors. He then appeared in films after a span of 10 years, in 1953 with Mangala Gowri, Kanyadana and Kokilavani which marked his debut as a lead actor. Krishnamurthy then began to assist well known film directors like Shankar Singh, B. Vittalacharya, B. R. Panthulu and others. He also worked as an assistant to well known lyricist and director Kanagal Prabhakara Shastry and learnt the art of writing poems. As filmmaking was less during the 1950s, Krishnamurthy slowly shifted his base to theatre and worked for some of the very famous stage companies of that time. He worked for K. Hirannaiah, Subbaiah Naidu, Gubbi Company and other prominent stage troupes of that era. In 1962, he started his own stage troupe called Amba Prasada Nataka Mandali. But, finding it difficult to manage the company due to heavy expenses, he shut it down in 1966 and returned to films.

In his second innings in films, Krishnamurthy played roles as comedian, villain and supporting artist. He became known for his role as Connection Kalappa in Puttanna Kanagal's 1978 film Paduvaaralli Pandavaru. Following this and with roles in films in the 1970s and '80s like Dharmasere, Ranganayaki, Guru Shishyaru, Antha, Nanna Devaru, Haalu Jenu and Kaviratna Kalidasa, Krishnamurthy became one of Kannada cinema's most wanted actors. In 1981, he started his film production company called Yashaswini Enterprises under which he produced the film Number 5 Ekka in which he recorded a duet, "Honganasu Nanasagide" with Bangalore Latha. Being a film producer, he continued appearing in films with his last appearance coming in the 1985 film Veeradhi Veera.
