= List of Kannada films of 1989 =

== Top-grossing films ==
| Rank | Title | Collection | Ref. |
|---|---|---|---|
| 1. | Nanjundi Kalyana | ₹4 crore (₹44.62 crore in 2025) | |
| 2. | Deva | ₹3.75 crore (₹41.83 crore in 2025) | |
| 4. | Yuddha Kaanda | ₹3.5 crore (₹39.8 crore in 2025) | |
| 3. | Indrajith | ₹3 crore (₹33.46crore in 2025) | |
| 5. | Sharavegada Saradara | ₹2 crore (₹22.31 crore in 2025) | |

== Successful Films list ==
- Nanjundi Kalyana
- Deva
- Indrajith
- Yuddha Kaanda
- Sharavegada Saradara
- Tarka
- Gajapathi Garvabhanga
- Hrudaya Geethe
- C.B.I. Shankar
- Love Maadi Nodu
- Hendthighelbedi
- Yuga Purusha
- Rudra
- Hongkongnalli Agent Amar
- Parashuram
- Inspector Vikram

== Released films ==
The following is a list of films produced in the Kannada film industry in India in 1989, presented in alphabetical order.

| Title | Director | Cast | Music |
|---|---|---|---|
| Abhimana | P. N. Srinivas | P. N. Srinivas, Gayathri, K. S. Ashwath, Leelavathi | M. Ranga Rao |
| Ade Raaga Ade Haadu | M. S. Rajashekar | Shivarajkumar, Seema, Srinath, Thoogudeepa Srinivas | Shankar–Ganesh |
| Adhrushta Rekhe | Renuka Sharma | Kashinath, Amrutha, Sudhir, Doddanna | Shankar–Ganesh |
| Amaanusha | N. R. Nanjunde Gowda | Ananth Nag, Bhavya, Kavya, Devaraj | Hamsalekha |
| Anantana Avantara | Kashinath | Kashinath, Anjali Sudhakar, Kavitha, Dinesh | Hamsalekha |
| Ananthara | Anwar Thavarekere | Srinath, Geetha, Vanitha Vasu, Jai Jagadish | Guna Singh |
| Anthintha Gandu Nanalla | Srinivas | Ambareesh, Shankar Nag, Nishanthi, Sridhar, Tara | Vijay Anand |
| Avane Nanna Ganda | K. Prabhakar | Kashinath, Sudharani, Vanitha Vasu, Sudhir, Doddanna | Hamsalekha |
| Avathara Purusha | Raj Kishore | Ambareesh, Sumalatha, Tara, Jai Jagadish | Vijay Anand |
| Bala Hombale | M. S. Rajashekar | Rajesh, Suman Ranganathan, Vinod Alva, Ramesh Bhat | Upendra Kumar |
| Bangarada Baduku | B. S. Ranga | Tiger Prabhakar, Lakshmi, M. P. Shankar, Nagesh, Master Manjunath | Shankar–Ganesh |
| Bidisada Bandha | Tiger Prabhakar | Tiger Prabhakar, Sujatha, Tara, Ramakrishna, Vijay Kashi, Abhinaya | M. Ranga Rao |
| Bisilu Beladingalu | Kodlu Ramakrishna | Sridhar, Sudha Chandran, Padma Vasanthi, Balakrishna | M. Ranga Rao |
| C.B.I. Shankar | P. Nanjundappa | Shankar Nag, Suman Ranganathan, Tara, Shashikumar, Devaraj, Vajramuni | Hamsalekha |
| Deva | Vijay | Vishnuvardhan, Rupini, Devaraj, Tara, Balakrishna | Upendra Kumar |
| Doctor Krishna | Phani Ramachandra | Vishnuvardhan, Suman Ranganathan, Tara, Leelavathi, Ramesh Bhat | Rajan–Nagendra |
| En Swamy Aliyandire | Jayanthi | Tiger Prabhakar, Jayanthi, Tara, Rajashekar, Rajalakshmi | Shankar–Ganesh |
| Gagana | Dorai-Bhagavan | Ananth Nag, Khushbu, Mahalakshmi, Srinath, Vanitha Vasu, Leelavathi | Rajan–Nagendra |
| Gajapathi Garvabhanga | M. S. Rajashekar | Raghavendra Rajkumar, Malashri, Srinath, Dheerendra Gopal, Abhinaya | Upendra Kumar |
| Gandandre Gandu | V. Somashekhar | Ambareesh, Nalini, Jai Jagadish, Thoogudeepa Srinivas | G. K. Venkatesh |
| Guru | Srikanth Nahatha | Ambareesh, Neeta Puri, Srinath, B. Saroja Devi, Thoogudeepa Srinivas | Bappi Lahiri |
| Hendthighelbedi | Dinesh Baboo | Ananth Nag, Mahalakshmi, Sundar Krishna Urs, Tara, Devaraj | Vijay Anand |
| Hongkongnalli Agent Amar | Joe Simon | Ambareesh, Ambika, Sumalatha, Umashree, Vajramuni, K. S. Ashwath | Peter J. Kamilose |
| Hosa Kavya | Sivachandran | Tiger Prabhakar, Lakshmi, Aishwarya, Vinod Alva, Ramesh Bhat | Shankar–Ganesh |
| Hrudaya Geethe | H. R. Bhargava | Vishnuvardhan, Bhavya, Khushbu, Devaraj, Sridhar, Umashree | Rajan–Nagendra |
| Idu Saadhya | Dinesh Baboo | Shankar Nag, Ananth Nag, Tiger Prabhakar, Srinath, Ramesh Aravind, Revathi, Mahalakshmi, Disco Shanti | Vijay Anand |
| Indrajith | K. V. Raju | Ambareesh, Deepika, Devaraj, Shashikumar, Doddanna | Hamsalekha |
| Inspector Vikram | Dinesh Baboo | Shivarajkumar, Kavya, Sundar Krishna Urs, K. S. Ashwath, Chi Guru Dutt | Vijay Anand |
| Jai Karnataka | Dwarakish | Ambareesh, Rajani, Mukhyamantri Chandru | Vijay Anand |
| Jayabheri | G. K. Mudduraj | Shankar Nag, Ambareesh, Bhavya, Vanitha Vasu, Rajesh | Shankar–Ganesh |
| Jacky | B. Subba Rao | Ambareesh, Geetha, Mahalakshmi, Devaraj, Ramesh Bhat, Lokanath | S. P. Balasubrahmanyam |
| Kindari Jogi | V. Ravichandran | V. Ravichandran, Juhi Chawla, Lokesh, Thoogudeepa Srinivas, Doddanna, Mukhyamantri Chandru, Abhinaya, Master Manjunath, Sundar Raj | Hamsalekha |
| Krishna Nee Kunidaga | Dwarakish | Vinod Raj, Sudharani, Jaggesh, Nachiketha, M. S. Umesh, Hema Chowdhary | Vijay Anand |
| Love Maadi Nodu | A. Subramanyam | Kashinath, Sridhar, Srilatha, Master Manjunath, Dinesh | L. Vaidyanathan |
| Madhuri | K. V. Jayaram | Vinod Alva, Geetha, Loknath, H. G. Dattatreya | Sangeetha Raja |
| Mahayuddha | M. D. Kaushik | Shankar Nag, Mahalakshmi, Vinod Alva, Anjali Sudhakar | Shankar–Ganesh |
| Mane | Girish Kasaravalli | Naseeruddin Shah, Deepti Naval, Rohini, Mico Chandru | L. Vaidyanathan |
| Manmatha Raja | Om Sai Prakash | Kashinath, Sudharani, Jaggesh, Srinivasa Murthy | K. Chakravarthy |
| Muthinanta Manushya | Om Sai Prakash | Tiger Prabhakar, Bharathi, Vajramuni, Mukhyamantri Chandru, Abhinaya | K. Chakravarthy |
| Namma Bhoomi | Thiagarajan | Tiger Prabhakar, Nalini, Charan Raj, Ilavarasi | Ilaiyaraaja |
| Nanjundi Kalyana | M. S. Rajashekar | Raghavendra Rajkumar, Malashri, Lokesh, Thoogudeepa Srinivas | Upendra Kumar |
| Narasimha | Om Sai Prakash | Shankar Nag, Chandrika, Vanitha Vasu | Hamsalekha |
| Nyayakkagi Naanu | A. T. Raghu | Ambareesh, Sumalatha, Srinath, Jayanthi | Satyam |
| Ondagi Balu | K. S. R. Das | Vishnuvardhan, Manjula Sharma, Avinash, Pandari Bai, Umashree | Vijay Anand |
| Onti Salaga | V. Somashekhar | Ambareesh, Khushbu, Jai Jagadish, Tiger Prabhakar, Vajramuni | Hamsalekha |
| Padmavyuha | A. T. Raghu | Tiger Prabhakar, Mahalakshmi, Srinath, Manjula Sharma, Murali, Tara, Disco Shanthi, Sathyajith, Thriveni | Yuvaraj |
| Parashuram | V. Somashekhar | Rajkumar, Vani Viswanath, Mahalakshmi, Puneeth Rajkumar, Thoogudeepa Srinivas, C. R. Simha | Hamsalekha |
| Poli Huduga | S. S. Ravichandra | V. Ravichandran, Karishma, Jaggesh, Tara, Devaraj | Hamsalekha |
| Premagni | T. S. Nagabharana | Arjun Sarja, Khushbu, Shashikumar, Tara | Hamsalekha |
| Preyasi Preethisu | Mallesh | Kashinath, Sagarika, Dinesh, Janaki | L. Vaidyanathan |
| Raja Yuvaraja | Raj Kishore | Ambareesh, Sumalatha, Tara, Tiger Prabhakar, Jaggesh | Vijay Anand |
| Rajasimha | Joe Simon | Shankar Nag, Bhavya | M. Ranga Rao |
| Rudra | K. S. R. Das | Vishnuvardhan, Khushbu, Vajramuni, Doddanna, K. S. Ashwath | Gangai Amaren |
| Samsara Nouke | D. Rajendra Babu | Ambareesh, Mahalakshmi, Geetha, Pandari Bai, Balakrishna | M. Ranga Rao |
| Sankranthi | N. R. Nanjunde Gowda | Lokesh, Saritha, Sundar Raj, C. R. Simha | L. Vaidyanathan |
| Sharavegada Saradara | K. V. Jayaram | Kumar Bangarappa, Ashwini Bhave, Asha Parekh, C. R. Simha | Sangeetha Raja |
| Singari Bangari | Chandrahasa Alva | Kashinath, Vinod Alva, Kavya, Jayarekha | Hamsalekha |
| Sura Sundaranga | Kashinath | Kashinath, Abhinaya, Tara | Hamsalekha |
| Tarka | Sunil Kumar Desai | Shankar Nag, Vanitha Vasu, Devaraj, Avinash | Guna Singh |
| Thayigobba Tharle Maga | Om Sai Prakash | Kashinath, Chandrika, Jai Jagadish, Doddanna | M. Ranga Rao |
| Yuddha Kaanda | K. V. Raju | V. Ravichandran, Poonam Dhillon, Shashikumar, Devaraj, Jaggesh, Master Manjunath | Hamsalekha |
| Yuga Purusha | D. Rajendra Babu | V. Ravichandran, Khushbu, Moon Moon Sen, Ramakrishna, Mukhyamantri Chandru | Hamsalekha |

== See also ==
- Kannada films of 1988
- Kannada films of 1990
