= List of Kannada films of 1988 =

== Top-grossing films ==
Rank	Title	Collection	Ref.
1.	Ranadheera	₹8 crore (₹114.44 crore in 2025)	
2.	Sangliyana	₹5 crore (₹71.52 crore in 2025)	
3.	Devatha Manushya	₹4 crore (₹57.22 crore in 2025)	
4.	Ranaranga	₹2 crore (₹28.61 crore in 2025)	
5.	Shiva Mecchida Kannappa	₹1 crore (₹14.35 crore in 2025)	

== List ==
The following is a list of films produced in the Kannada film industry in India in 1988, presented in alphabetical order.

Title	Director	Cast	Music	Reference
Aasphota	T. S. Nagabharana	Sridhar, Triveni, H. G. Dattatreya	C. Ashwath	
Anjada Gandu	Renuka Sharma	V. Ravichandran, Khushbu, Srinivasa Murthy, Devaraj, Master Manjunath, Umashri	Hamsalekha	
Arjun	A. T. Raghu	Ambareesh, Geetha, Kalyan Kumar, Devaraj, Mukhyamantri Chandru	Rajan–Nagendra	
Avale Nanna Hendthi	K. Prabhakar; S. Umesh	Kashinath, Bhavya, Tara, Mukhyamantri Chandru, N. S. Rao	Hamsalekha	
Balondu Bhavageethe	Geethapriya	Ananth Nag, Srinath, Saritha, Ramesh Bhat	Hamsalekha	
Bannada Vesha	Girish Kasaravalli	Sridhar, Charuhasan, Nalina Murthy	L. Vaidyanathan	
Bharath	Joe Simon	Tiger Prabhakar, Jayanthi, Abhinaya, Mukhyamantri Chandru	Shankar–Ganesh	
Bhoomi Thayane	Raj Kishor	Vinod Kumar Alva, Chi Guru Dutt, Bhavya, Jaggesh	Vijaya Bhaskar	
Brahma Vishnu Maheshwara	Rajachandra	Ambareesh, V. Ravichandran, Ananth Nag, Kiran Juneja, Thulasi, Mahalakshmi	Vijay Anand	
Chiranjeevi Sudhakar	Singeetham Srinivasa Rao	Raghavendra Rajkumar, Monisha Unni, Shashikumar, Kanchana, Balaraj, Vanitha Vasu	Upendra Kumar	
Daada	P. Vasu	Vishnuvardhan, Geetha, Sangeetha, Suparna, Devaraj	Vijay Anand	
December 31	Manobala	Vishnuvardhan, Urvashi, Jai Jagadish, Pavithra	Satyam	
Devatha Manushya	Singeetham Srinivasa Rao	Rajkumar, Geetha, Sudharani. K. S. Ashwath	Upendra Kumar	
Dharma Patni	M. S. Rajashekar	Vinod Alva, Tara, Lakshmi	Hamsalekha	
Dharmathma	A. Jagannathan	Shankar Nag, Ambika, Tiger Prabhakar, Ramakrishna	Rajan–Nagendra	
Elu Suttina Kote	B. C. Gowrishankar	Ambareesh, Gautami, Ramesh Aravind, Devaraj	L. Vaidyanathan	
Ganda Mane Makkalu	T. P. Gajendran	Srinath, Dwarakish, Vanisri, Sudha Rani, Ramesh Aravind	Vijay Anand	
Gudugu Sidilu	Shankar Nayyar	Jai Jagadish, Ramakrishna, Geetha, Anuradha, Vajramuni	Vijaya Bhaskar	
Jana Nayaka	H. R. Bhargava	Vishnuvardhan, Bhavya, Devaraj, Doddanna, Mukhyamantri Chandru	Rajan–Nagendra	
Kadina Benki	Suresh Heblikar	Suresh Heblikar, Vanitha Vasu, Mamta Rao, Girish Karnad	Vijaya Bhaskar	
Kampana	Vemagal Jagannath Rao	Tiger Prabhakar, Pavithra, Sharath Babu, Tara	L. Vaidyanathan	
Kankana Bhagya	Perala	Ramakrishna, Jeevitha, Shivakumar, Anand	Krishna - Chakra	
Kote	Baraguru Ramachandrappa	Tara, Sundar Raj, Maanu, Pramila Joshai	Chandrashekhara Kambara	
Krishna Rukmini	H. R. Bhargava	Vishnuvardhan, Ramya Krishna, Devaraj, Mukhyamantri Chandru, Umashree	K. V. Mahadevan	
Kirathaka	V. Somashekhar	Tiger Prabhakar, Ambika, Vajramuni	Hamsalekha	
Mahadasohi Sharana Basava	Shankaralinga Sugnalli	Srinivasa Murthy, Thriveni, K. S. Ashwath, Seetharam, Vaishali Kasaravalli	K. P. Sukhadev	
Matrudevobhava	N. S. Dhananjaya	Jai Jagadish, Ramakrishna, Srinivasa Murthy, Jayanthi, Mahalakshmi, Tara	Hamsalekha	
Matru Vatsalya	H. N. Shankar	Tiger Prabhakar, Srinath, Lakshmi	Shankar–Ganesh	
Meenakshi Mane Meshtru	T. N. Narasimhan	Devaraj, Tara, Raghunandan, Kalpana Reddy	S. P. Venkatesh	
Mithileya Seetheyaru	Lalitha Ravee	Geetha, Akhila Thandur, B. V. Radha, Kalpana Iyer, Shankar Nag, Vishnuvardhan, Kashinath	Vijaya Bhaskar	
Mutthaide	Renuka Sharma	Ananth Nag, Bhavya, Tara, Ramakrishna, Mukhyamantri Chandru	M. Ranga Rao	
Nammoora Raja	H. R. Bhargava	Vishnuvardhan, Rajesh, Manjula Sharma, Jai Jagadish	Rajan–Nagendra	
Nanna Avesha	Jaganmohan Rao	Lakshmi, Sundar Krishna Urs, Ramakrishna Hegde	Satyam	
Nava Bharatha	K. V. Raju	Ambareesh, Mahalakshmi, Devaraj, Doddanna	K. Chakravarthy	
Nee Nanna Daiva	Sundaranath Suvarna	Tiger Prabhakar, Mahalakshmi, Jayanthi, Sangeetha, Vajramuni, Devaraj	Shankar–Ganesh	
New Delhi	Joshi	Ambareesh, Suresh Gopi, Sumalatha, Urvashi, Paresh Rawal, Thyagarajan, C. R. Simha	Shyam	
Olavina Aasare	K. V. Jayaram	Vishnuvardhan, Rupini, Sudha Chandran	M. Ranga Rao	
Oorigitta Kolli	Kallesh	Kalyan Kumar, Sudha Chandran, Vijayaraj, Balakrishna	M. Ranga Rao	
Praja Prabhuthva	D. Rajendra Babu	Ambareesh, Mahalakshmi, Mukhyamantri Chandru, Umashree, Vajramuni	Shankar–Ganesh	
Prema Tapaswi	H. Ramesh	Pramod Chakravarthy, Mohan, Abhinaya	Hamsalekha	
Ramanna Shamanna	B. Subba Rao	Ambareesh, V. Ravichandran, Madhavi, Geetha, Devaraj, Umashree	S. P. Balasubrahmanyam	
Ranadheera	V. Ravichandran	V. Ravichandran, Khushbu, Ananth Nag, Jayachitra, Lokesh, Jaggesh, Jai Jagadish	Hamsalekha	
Ranaranga	V. Somashekhar	Shivarajkumar, Sudharani, Tara, Master Manjunath, Dheerendra Gopal, C. R. Simha	Hamsalekha	
Sahasa Veera	Om Sai Prakash	Vinod Alva, Gautami, Ramakrishna, Aparna	Satyam	
Sambhavami Yuge Yuge	Siddalingaiah	Murali, Sudharani, Padma Kumta, Dheerendra Gopal	Rajan–Nagendra	
Samyuktha	K. N. Chandrashekar Sharma	Shivarajkumar, Veena, Balaraj, Chi Guru Dutt, Avinash	Singeetham Srinivasa Rao	
Sangliyana	P. Nanjundappa	Shankar Nag, Ambareesh, Bhavya, Tara, Devaraj, Vajramuni, Master Manjunath	Hamsalekha	
Shakthi	Tiger Prabhakar	Tiger Prabhakar, Shankar Nag, Sharath Babu, Ramya Krishna, Vanitha Vasu	K. Chakravarthy	
Shanthi Nivasa	H. R. Bhargava	Ananth Nag, Bharathi, Vijay Kashi, Ramesh Bhat	M. Ranga Rao	
Shiva Mecchida Kannappa	Vijay	Shivarajkumar, Master Puneeth, Geetha, Saraladevi	T. G. Lingappa	
Sri Venkateshwara Mahime	Anil Baindur	Ananth Nag, Saritha, Pandari Bai, Somayajulu	M. S. Viswanathan	
Suprabhatha	Dinesh Babu	Vishnuvardhan, Suhasini, Srividya, Maanu	Rajan–Nagendra	
Tabarana Kathe	Girish Kasaravalli	Charuhasan, Nalina Murthy, Madhava Rao, Ha Sa Kru	L. Vaidyanathan	
Thayi Karulu	N. S. Dhananjaya	Srinivasa Murthy, Jayanthi, Vinod Alva, Jai Jagadish, Tara, Vanitha Vasu	Satyam	
Thayigobba Karna	Raj Kishor	Ambareesh, Sumalatha, Jai Jagadish, Tara	Vijaya Bhaskar	
Thayiya Aase	Raj Kishor	Rajesh, Pramila Joshai, Bhavya, Vinod Alva	Vijaya Bhaskar	
Vijaya Khadga	V. Somashekar	Ambareesh, Srinath, Ambika, M. P. Shankar	Hamsalekha	

== See also ==
- Kannada films of 1987
- Kannada films of 1989
