= List of Kannada films of 1987 =

== Highest-grossing films ==
Rank	Title	Collection	Ref.
1.	Premaloka	₹12 crore (₹171.66 crore in 2025)	

== List ==
The following is a list of films produced in the Kannada film industry in India in 1987, presented in alphabetical order.

Title	Director	Cast	Music	Reference
Aaganthuka	Suresh Heblikar	Suresh Heblikar, Vanitha Vasu, Devaraj, Jayashri	Rajiv Taranath	
Aapadbandhava	A. T. Raghu	Ambareesh, Ambika, Parijatha, Lohithaswa	Rajan–Nagendra	
Aase	Jayarama Reddy	Charan Raj, Geetha, N. S. Rao, Disco Shanti	Ravi Shenoy	
Aaseya Bale	Raj Kishor	Vishnuvardhan, Nalini, Jai Jagadish, Loknath	Vijaya Bhaskar	
Agni Kanye	T Janardhan	Raja, Jai Jagadish, Ranjini, Dinesh	Shankar–Ganesh	
Anthima Ghatta	Janakiram	Shankar Nag, Urvashi, Tara, Ramesh Bhat	Vijaya Bhaskar	
Anthima Theerpu	A. T. Raghu	Ambareesh, Bharathi, Geetha, Thoogudeepa Srinivas	Hamsalekha	
Athiratha Maharatha	Perala	Ananth Nag, Tiger Prabhakar, Ambika, Avinash	K. Chakravarthy	
Avasthe	Krishna Masadi	Ananth Nag, Archana, B. V. Karanth, M. P. Prakash, J. H. Patel	Vijaya Bhaskar	
Baala Nouke	Shantaram Kanagal	Srinivasa Murthy, Roopadevi, Tara	K. P. Sukhadev	
Bandha Muktha	K. V. Raju	Tiger Prabhakar, Bharathi, Devaraj, Ramakrishna	Vijaya Bhaskar	
Bazar Bheema	Perala	Ambareesh, Geetha, Ambika, K. S. Ashwath	Satyam	
Bedi	V. Somashekhar	Ambareesh, Bhavya, Sudha Chandran, Tiger Prabhakar	Hamsalekha	
Bhadrakali	Renuka Sharma	Sridhar, Mahalakshmi, Tara	Satyam	
Daivashakti	Renuka Sharma	Ananth Nag, Bhavya, Thoogudeepa Srinivas, Umashree	Hamsalekha	
Dance Raja Dance	Dwarakish	Vinod Raj, Devaraj, Divya, Sangeetha, Srinath	Vijay Anand	
Digvijaya	Soma	Ambareesh, Shankar Nag, Ambika, Radha, Srinath, Vajramuni	Hamsalekha	
Ee Bandha Anubandha	K. Janakiram	Shankar Nag, Zarina Wahab, Master Manjunath, Vajramuni	Ramesh Naidu	
Hosa Madam	S. Anand	Mukhyamantri Chandru, Bharathi, Sundar Raj, Lohitashwa	S. P. Kumar	
Hrudaya Pallavi	R. N. Jayagopal	Srinath, Geetha, Pavithra, Ramakrishna	M. Ranga Rao	
Huli Hebbuli	Vijay	Shankar Nag, Tiger Prabhakar, Sumalatha, Bhavya, Ananth Nag, Leelavathi	Vijaya Bhaskar	
Inspector Krantikumar	A. T. Raghu	Ambareesh, Geetha, Bhavya, Jai Jagadish, Mukhyamantri Chandru	Rajan–Nagendra	
Jayasimha	P. Vasu	Vishnuvardhan, Mahalakshmi, Vajramuni, Umashree	Vijay Anand	
Jeevana Jyothi	P. Vasu	Vishnuvardhan, Ambika, Nalini	Vijay Anand	
Karunamayi	H. R. Bhargava	Vishnuvardhan, Bhavya, Tara, Pandari Bai, K. S. Ashwath	Rajan–Nagendra	
Kendada Male	B. C. Gowrishankar	Devaraj, Nagesh Kashyap, Sundar Krishna Urs, Chandralekha	L. Vaidyanathan	
Kurukshetra	H. R. Bhargava	Ananth Nag, Saritha, Bhavya, Tara, Charan Raj, Doddanna	M. Ranga Rao	
Manamecchida Hudugi	M.S.Rajshekar	Shivarajkumar, Sudharani, Sundar Krishna Urs	Upendra Kumar	
Manasa Veene	Geethapriya	Sridhar, Srinath, Saritha	M. Ranga Rao	
Mr. Raja	V. Somashekhar	Ambareesh, Mahalakshmi, Tara, Mukhyamantri Chandru	Hamsalekha	
Mukhavada	M. D. Kaushik	Ramakrishna, Tara, Jayanthi, Loknath	K. P. Sukhdev	
Nyaayakke Shikshe	Srinivas	Sridhar, Bharathi, Ambika, Charan Raj	Vijay Anand	
Olavina Udugore	Rajendra Babu	Ambareesh, Manjula Sharma, Ramakrishna, N. S. Rao	M. Ranga Rao	
Onde Goodina Hakkigalu	Rajachandra	Tiger Prabhakar, Lakshmi, Shubha, Vikram	Vijay Anand	
Ondu Muttina Kathe	Shankar Nag	Rajkumar, Archana, Mukhyamantri Chandru, Doddanna, Shivaram	L. Vaidyanathan	
Poornachandra	C. V. Rajendran	Ambareesh, Ambika, Srinath	G. K. Venkatesh	
Premaloka	V. Ravichandran	V. Ravichandran, Juhi Chawla, Leelavathi, Mukhyamantri Chandru	Hamsalekha	
Pushpaka Vimana	Singeetham Srinivasa Rao	Kamal Haasan, Amala, Tinnu Anand, Amjad Khan, Prathap Pothan	L. Vaidyanathan	
Ravana Rajya	T. S. Nagabharana	Devaraj, Bhavya, Tara	Vijay Anand	
Sampradaya	Master Hirannayya	Master Hirannayya, Bharathi, Seetharam	P. Vajrappa	
Sangrama	K. V. Raju	Ravichandran, Bhavya, Lokesh, Loknath	Hamsalekha	
Sathwa Pareekshe	Srinivas	Tiger Prabhakar, Bhavya, Sridhar, Jayachitra	Vijay Anand	
Sathyam Shivam Sundaram	K. S. R. Das	Vishnuvardhan, Sumithra, Radhika, Vajramuni	K. Chakravarthy	
Shivabhakta Markandeya	B. S. Ranga	Rajesh, Roopa Devi, Padma Vasanthi	M. Ranga Rao	
Shruthi Seridaaga	Chi. Dattaraj	Rajkumar, Madhavi, Geetha, Balakrishna	T. G. Lingappa	
Shubha Milana	H. R. Bhargava	Vishnuvardhan, Ambika, Tara, Uday, K. S. Ashwath	M. Ranga Rao	
Sowbhagya Lakshmi	H. R. Bhargava	Vishnuvardhan, Lakshmi, Radha, Ramesh Bhat	S. P. Balasubrahmanyam	
Sri Chamundeshwari Pooja Mahime	B V Srinivas	Ramakrishna, Rohini, Vajramuni	Vijaya Krishnamurthy	
Surya	Baraguru Ramachandrappa	Lokesh, Rohini Hattangadi, Maanu, Pramila Joshai	Vijaya Bhaskar	
Thaliya Aane	D. Rajendra Babu	Tiger Prabhakar, Bharathi, Vinod Alva, Manjula Sharma	Vijaya Bhaskar	
Thayi	Perala	Ananth Nag, Shankar Nag, Bhavya, Gayathri, Tara	Satyam	
Thayi Kotta Thali	Ravindranath	Murali, Mahalakshmi, Lokesh, Jayanthi	M. Ranga Rao	
Vijay	Jayanthi	Rajashekar, Kim, Jai Jagadish, Sundar Krishna Urs, Jayamalini	M. Ranga Rao	
Yaarigagi	Pradeep Kumar	Ramakrishna, Sridhar, Vijay Kashi, Varnalatha, Leelavathi	G. K. Venkatesh	

== See also ==
- Kannada films of 1986
- Kannada films of 1988
