= Mysore Lokesh =

Indian (Kannada-cinema) actor (1947–1994)

- Lokesh Photo in a movie
- Born: 29 April 1947; Bengaluru, Mysore state, (Now Karnataka), India
- Died: 14 October 1994 (aged 47)
- Occupations: Film actor; director
- Spouse: Parvathi Lokesh
- Children: Pavitra Lokesh, Aditya Lokesh

Mysore Lokesh (29 April 1947 – 14 October 1994) was an Indian actor in the Kannada film industry. His films include Bandhana (1984), Gajapathi Garvabhanga (1989), and S. P. Sangliyana Part 2 (1990), He did comedic, Supporting and villainous roles in most films.

== Career ==
He was a part of more than three hundred films.

== Selected filmography ==
- Karnana Sampatthu (2005)
- Prema Geethe (1997)
- Keralida Sarpa (1994)
- Nyayakkagi Saval (1994)
- Abhijith (1993)
- Praana Snehitha (1993)
- Wanted (1993)
- Aathma Bandhana (1992)
- Gharshane (1992)
- Goonda Rajya (1992)
- Hatamari Hennu Kiladi Gandu (1992)
- Hendtheere Hushar (1992)
- Megha Mandara (1992)
- Bombat Hendthi (1992)
- Mysore Jaana (1992)
- Ravivarma (1992)
- Shivanaga (1992)
- Solillada Saradara (1992)
- Tharle Nan Maga (1992)
- Edurmaneli Ganda Pakkadmaneli Hendthi (1992)
- Kranthi Gandhi (1992)
- Gandharva (1992)
- Pruthviraj (1992)
- Prajegalu Prabhugalu (1992)
- Samarasimha (1992)
- Hosa Kalla Hale Kulla (1992)
- Anatha Rakshaka (1991)
- Aranyadalli Abhimanyu (1991)
- Bhairavi (1991)
- Elukoti Marthanda Bhairava (1991)
- Golmaal Radhakrishna 2 (1991)
- Hosamane Aliya (1991)
- Ibbaru Hendira Muddina Police (1991)
- Kalla Malla (1991)
- Kaliyuga Bheema (1991)
- Kitturina Huli (1991)
- Kollur Kala (1991)
- Lion Jagapathi Rao (1991)
- Maneli Ili Beedeeli Huli (1991)
- Nanagu Hendthi Beku (1991)
- Ramachaari (1991)
- Ranachandi (1991)
- Shivaraj (1991)
- Shwethaagni (1991)
- Sri Nanjundeshwara Mahime (1991)
- Sundara Kanda (1991)
- Thavarumane Udugore (1991)
- Varagala Bete (1991)
- Veerappan (1991)
- Aata Bombata (1990)
- Abhimanyu (1990)
- Agni Divya (1990)
- Ashoka Chakra (1990)
- Baare Nanna Muddina Rani (1990)
- Bhale Chathura (1990)
- Challenge Gopalakrishna (1990)
- Golmaal Radhakrishna (1990)
- Hosa Jeevana (1990)
- Ivalentha Hendthi (1990)
- Kiladi Thatha (1990)
- Mathsara (1990)
- Mathe Haditu Kogile (1990)
- Neene Nanna Jeeva (1990)
- Nigooda Rahasya (1990)
- Poli Kitty (1990)
- Policena Hendthi (1990)
- Ranabheri (1990)
- Rani Maharani (1990)
- Rudra Thandava (1990)
- S. P. Sangliyana Part 2 (1990)
- Sri Satyanarayana Pooja Phala (1990)
- Swarna Samsara (1990)
- Adrushta Rekhe (1989)
- Amaanusha (1989)
- Avane Nanna Ganda (1989)
- Avathara Purusha (1989)
- Bala Hombale (1989)
- Deva (1989)
- Gajapathi Garvabhanga (1989)
- Hrudaya Geethe (1989)
- Inspector Vikram (1989)
- Jayabheri (1989)
- Jacky (1989)
- Kindari Jogi (1989)
- Madhuri (1989)
- Manmatha Raja (1989)
- Muthinantha Manushya (1989)
- Nanjundi Kalyana (1989)
- Nyayakkaagi Naanu (1989)
- Ondagi Balu (1989)
- Poli Huduga (1989)
- Preyasi Preethisu (1989)
- Rudra (1989)
- Thayigobba Tharle Maga (1989)
- Anjada Gandu (1988)
- Arjun (1988)
- Daada (1988)
- December 31 (1988)
- Jana Nayaka (1988)
- Krishna Rukmini (1988)
- Mahadasohi Sharana Basava (1988)
- Matru Devo Bhava (1988)
- Mathru Vathsalya (1988) as Siddhappa
- Nava Bharatha (1988)
- Nee Nanna Daiva (1988) as Home Minister Lokesh
- Olavina Aasare (1988)
- Ramanna Shamanna (1988)
- Shanthi Nivasa (1988)
- Vijaya Khadga (1988)
- Oorigitta Kolli (1988)
- Aapadbandhava (1987)
- Anthima Ghatta (1987)
- Anthima Theerpu (1987)
- Bazar Bheema (1987)
- Jayasimha (1987)
- Jeevana Jyothi (1987)
- Kurukshethra (1987)
- Nyaayakke Shikshe (1987)
- Sangrama (1987)
- Shubha Milana (1987)
- Belli Naaga (1986)
- Bete (1986)
- Bhagyada Lakshmi Baramma (1986)
- Ee Jeeva Ninagagi (1986)
- Krishna Nee Begane Baro (1986)
- Maneye Manthralaya (1985)
- Mrugaalaya (1986)
- Nannavaru (1986)
- Prema Gange (1986)
- Ratha Sapthami (1986)
- Sathkara (1986)
- Sundara Swapnagalu (1986)
- Devara Mane (1985)
- Giri Baale (1985)
- Goonda Guru (1985)
- Guru Jagadguru (1985)
- Jwaalamukhi (1985)
- Nee Thanda Kanike (1985)
- Pithamaha (1985)
- Thulasidala (1985)
- Bandhana (1984)
- Benki Birugali (1984)
- Indina Bharatha (1984)
- Mooru Janma (1984)
- Olavu Moodidaga (1984)
- Samayada Gombe (1984)
- Sidilu (1984)
- Prema Jyothi (1983)
- Benkiya Bale (1983)
- Bhaktha Prahlada (1983)
- Eradu Nakshatragalu (1983)
- Gayathri Maduve (1983)
- Geluvu Nannade (1983)
- Hosa Theerpu (1983)
- Ibbani Karagithu (1983)
- Kaamana Billu (1983)
- Mududida Tavare Aralithu (1983)
- Prema Yuddha (1983)
- Baadada Hoo (1982)
- Chellida Raktha (1982)
- Hosa Belaku (1982)
- Maanasa Sarovara (1982)
- Shankar Sundar (1982)
- Gaali Maathu (1981)
- Koodi Balidare Swarga Sukha (1981)
- Leader Vishwanath (1981)
- Maha Prachandaru (1981)
- Muniyana Madari (1981)
- Rusthum Jodi (1980)...Shekhar's father
- Chandanada Gombe (1979)

== See also ==
- List of people from Karnataka
- Cinema of Karnataka
- List of Indian film actors
- Cinema of India
