= Nigooda Rahasya =

- VCD cover
- Directed by: Perala
- Written by: Perala
- Screenplay by: Perala
- Produced by: Jagadish Malnad; Kashinath Chindupurge
- Starring: Shankar Nag; Geetha; Vanitha Vasu; Tara
- Cinematography: Manohar C.
- Edited by: Anil Malnad
- Music by: Hamsalekha
- Production company: J R K Visions
- Release date: 29 November 1990
- Country: India
- Language: Kannada

Nigooda Rahasya (transl. Unsolved mystery) is a 1990 Indian Kannada-language suspense thriller film, directed by Perala and produced by Jagadish Malnad and Kashinath Chindupurge. The film stars Shankar Nag, Geetha, Vanitha Vasu and Tara in the lead roles. The film has musical score by Hamsalekha.

The movie was released after the demise of Shankar Nag. His brother Anant Nag dubbed for Shankar's character. The core thematic plot of the movie is based on the legend of Naale Baa.

== Plot ==
Mohan, an engineer, is hired by a rich businessman to perfectly finish a large building project. However, much to his amazement, the remote area where he resides happens to be a mysterious one; where some or other resident disappears on specific days after a long power cut and reappears after a few days on the outskirts of the city as a corpse. He also comes across various chilling factors such as a supposed ghost, a haunted house, a gang of men who disappear in a matter of seconds and a powerful monster. The rest of the movie deals with Mohan's journey to bring out the truth.

== Cast ==
- Shankar Nag as Mohan (Voice dubbed by Anant Nag)
- Geetha as Deepa and Roopa (Dual Role)
- Vanitha Vasu as Rohini
- Tara
- Doddanna
- Sudheer
- K. S. Ashwath
- Sadashiva Brahmavar
- Ramesh Bhat
- Mysore Lokesh
- Sihi Kahi Chandru
- Umashree
- Kaminidharan
- Lohithaswa
- Rathnakar
- Shringar Nagaraj
- Lalitha
- Seema
- Kala
- Baby Rashmi
- Baby Lakshmi
- Master Sanju
- Ramamurthy
- Srishailan
- Ramachandra
- Smt Ramachandra
- Chikkanna
- Ramesh Pandith

== Soundtrack ==
Hamsalekha himself sang a song in this movie - Enappa Yajmana.

Track #	Song	Singer(s)
1	"Madana mohana"	S. Janaki
2	"Thiliya neera"	K. J. Yesudas, Manjula Gururaj
3	"Maanasa ragavidu"	S Janaki
4	"Enappa yajmana"	Hamsalekha
5	"Laali jo"	K J Yesudas, S Janaki
