= Sangrama (film) =

1987 film directed by K. V. Raju

- Directed by: K. V. Raju
- Story by: Javed Akhtar
- Based on: Arjun (1985) by Rahul Rawail
- Produced by: C. Rajkumar
- Starring: V. Ravichandran; Bhavya; Lokesh; Ramakrishna; Lokanath; Mukhyamantri Chandru; Lohithaswa; Doddanna; Disco Shanti; Devaraj; Batti Mahadevappa; Mysore Lokesh; Dheerendra Gopal; Jaggesh; Ramesh Aravind
- Music by: Hamsalekha
- Release date: 30 September 1987
- Running time: 138 minutes
- Country: India
- Language: Kannada

Sangrama (transl. Struggle) is a 1987 Indian Kannada language action crime film directed by K. V. Raju. The movie was a remake of Sunny Deol starrer 1985 hit movie Arjun.

== Cast ==
- V. Ravichandran
- Bhavya
- Lokesh
- Ramakrishna
- Aparna
- Loknath
- Jaggesh
- Mukhyamantri Chandru
- Ramesh Aravind
- Disco Shanti in an item number

== Soundtrack ==
Soundtrack was composed by Hamsalekha.

- Dandam Dashagunam – S. P. Balasubrahmanyam
- Vandane Nooru – S. P. Balasubrahmanyam
- Avasarapurada – S. P. Balasubrahmanyam
- Adenadu – S. Janaki
