= Nammoora Raja =

- Directed by: H. R. Bhargava
- Screenplay by: H. R. Bhargava
- Story by: P. Vasu
- Starring: Vishnuvardhan; Manjula Sharma; Jai Jagadish; Mukhyamantri Chandru
- Cinematography: D. V. Rajaram
- Edited by: K. S. Shivachandran
- Music by: Rajan–Nagendra
- Production company: Pragathi Enterprises
- Release date: 19 April 1988
- Country: India
- Language: Kannada

Nammoora Raja (Kannada: ನಮ್ಮೂರ ರಾಜ) is a 1988 Indian Kannada film, directed by H. R. Bhargava. The film stars Vishnuvardhan, Manjula Sharma, Jai Jagadish and Mukhyamantri Chandru in the lead roles. The film has musical score by Rajan–Nagendra. P. Vasu, the story writer of this film remade the movie in Tamil as Vaathiyaar Veettu Pillai.

== Cast ==
- Vishnuvardhan as Raja
- Rajesh
- Manjula Sharma
- Jai Jagadish
- Aparna
- Sangeetha
- Mukhyamantri Chandru as Lakshmipathy
- Sathyajith
- Rajanand
- Phani Ramachandra as Umapathy
- Kunigal Nagabhushan
- Jayaram Reddy
- Shivaprakash
- Bemel Somanna
- Janardhan
- Negro Johnny
- Srishaila as Sharada
- Shankar Bhat
- Ramamurthy
- Janaki
- Disco Shanthi as Gouri
