= Digvijaya (film) =

- Directed by: Somu
- Written by: Somu
- Screenplay by: K. S. Sathyanarayana
- Produced by: Geetha Srinath; Somu; M. S. Karanth
- Starring: Ambareesh; Srinath; Shankar Nag; Ambika
- Cinematography: V. K. Kannan
- Edited by: Yadav Victor
- Music by: Hamsalekha
- Production company: Vijayeshwari Productions
- Release date: 27 May 1987
- Country: India
- Language: Kannada

Digvijaya is a 1987 Indian Kannada film, directed by Somu and produced by Geetha Srinath, Somu, and M. S. Karanth. The film stars Ambareesh, Srinath, Shankar Nag, and Ambika. The film has a musical score by Hamsalekha.

== Cast ==
- Ambareesh as Inspector Arjun
- Srinath as Gundu Rao
- Shankar Nag as DCP Chandrashekhar
- Ambika as Asha/Radha
- Radha in Cameo
- Vajramuni as Vikram
- C. R. Simha as Dasayya
- Sudheer
- Dheerendra Gopal as Mahesh
- Sundar Krishna Urs as Judge
- Sundar Raj as Vijay
- Ramesh Bhat as Soorappa Nayak
- Shivaram
- N. S. Rao as constable Kapinipathi
- M. S. Karanth as Kumar
- K. V. Manjayya as advocate
- Mandeep Roy as constable Ranga
- Upasane Seetharam
- Umashree as Shivi
- Jyothi Bantwal as Roopa
- Shanthamma
- Shyamala
- Swarnamma
- V. Ramachandra
- M. Ranga
- Police Mahadevaiah
- Tiptur Siddaramaiah
- Lakshman
- Ravi
- Master Chethan
- Baby Sangeetha
- Archana
- Seema
- Y. R. Ashwath Narayana Rao
- Somu
- Negro Johnny as Panja
