= Rudra (film) =

- VCD cover
- Directed by: K. S. R. Das
- Written by: K. S. R. Das
- Produced by: K. Sukumar
- Starring: Vishnuvardhan; Khushbu; K. S. Ashwath; Vajramuni
- Cinematography: Lakshman
- Edited by: D. Venkatarathnam
- Music by: Gangai Amaren
- Production company: Sukumar Art Combines
- Release date: 28 April 1989
- Running time: 138 minutes
- Country: India
- Language: Kannada

Rudra is a 1989 Indian Kannada-language action film directed & written by K. S. R. Das. The film starred Vishnuvardhan and Khushbu along with Vajramuni, K. S. Ashwath and Lohithaswa in supporting roles. The film's music is scored by Gangai Amaren and the cinematography is by Lakshman. The film was dubbed in Tamil as Khushboo Khushboothaan. Das remade the film in Telugu as Inspector Rudra starring Krishna.

== Cast ==
- Vishnuvardhan as Inspector Rudra Kumar
- Khushbu as Asha
- Charuhasan as Dharmaraj
- Aruna as Rani
- Vajramuni as Bhujang Rao
- K. S. Ashwath as Inspector Sadashiva
- Pandari Bai as Janakamma
- Vijayakashi as Micheal
- Doddanna
- Balakrishna
- Sundar Krishna Urs as DSP Somashekar
- Mysore Lokesh
- Lohithaswa
- Abhinaya as Sudha

== Soundtrack ==
The music of the film was composed by Gangai Amaren who was credited as Amar. Audio was released on Sangeetha Music label.

Track listing
No.	Title	Lyrics	Singer(s)	Length
1.	"Sangathi Bandaga"	Shyamsundar Kulkarni	S. P. Balasubrahmanyam, K. S. Chithra	04:37
2.	"Buddhi Helatthe Loka"	Geethapriya	S. P. Balasubrahmanyam	04:15
3.	"Nanna Thangi"	Shyamsundar Kulkarni	S. P. Balasubrahmanyam, Manjula Gururaj	04:38
4.	"Chikka Chikka"	R. N. Jayagopal	S. P. Balasubrahmanyam, K. S. Chithra	04:11
