= Sangya Balya =

- Directed by: Sundar Krishna Urs
- Story by: Based on folktale drama
- Produced by: F. D. Sali
- Starring: Bharti Patil; Ramakrishna; Vijay Kashi; Sundar Krishna Urs; Umashree; Basavaraj Gudigeri
- Music by: Vijaya Bhaskar
- Release date: 1992
- Running time: 2h 12min
- Country: India
- Language: Kannada

Sangya Balya (Kannada: ಸಂಗ್ಯಾ ಬಾಳ್ಯಾ) is a 1992 Indian Kannada film directed by Sundar Krishna Urs. The film's story is based on folktale of same name, written more than hundred years earlier. The music was scored by Vijaya Bhaskar. The film was shot in and around Turmari and Hunashikatti villages in Bailhongal Taluk, Belagavi District.

== Cast ==
- Bharati Patil as Ganga
- Ramakrishna as Sangya
- Vijay Kashi as Balya
- Basavaraj Gudigeri as Veeranna Setty
- Umashree as Paravva
- Haveri Babanna
- D Basavaraj
- Abhishek

== Soundtrack ==
- "Chiguru Meeseya Theedi" - Manjula Gururaj
- "Haniki Nodutha" - Manjula Gururaj, Yashavanth Halibandi
- "Erali Notadantha Henna" - Vishnu
- "Genethanada Gammatthu" - Gururaj Hosakote
- "Madhana Anthaara" - B. R. Chaya
- "Nodidu Baalina Bandiyu" - B. R. Chaya
