= Preethi Vathsalya =

- Directed by: H. R. Bhargava
- Written by: B. L. Venu
- Screenplay by: B. L. Venu
- Story by: B. L. Venu (Based on Novel)
- Produced by: Bhargava; D. V. Rajaram
- Starring: Tiger Prabhakar; Aarathi; Srinath; Sridhar
- Cinematography: D. V. Rajaram
- Music by: Rajan–Nagendra
- Production company: Kalakruthi
- Distributed by: Kalakruthi
- Release date: 15 September 1984
- Running time: 133 min
- Country: India
- Language: Kannada

Preethi Vathsalya is a 1984 Indian Kannada-language film, directed by H. R. Bhargava and produced by Bhargava and D. V. Rajaram. The film stars Tiger Prabhakar, Aarathi, Srinath and Sridhar. The film has musical score by Rajan–Nagendra.

== Cast ==
- Tiger Prabhakar as Prabhakar
- Aarathi as Saroja
- Srinath as Shankar
- Sridhar
- Saroja
- Sudheer as Manohar
- Vishwa Vijetha
- Vijaykashi
- Ramesh Bhat
- Aravind
- Uma Shivakumar
- M. S. Karanth
- Srinivasa Murthy
- Rajanand
- Hanumanthachar
- Keerthiraj
- Thimmayya
- Lohithashwa
- Anuradha
- Mico Chandru

== Soundtrack ==
The music was composed by Rajan–Nagendra.

No.	Song	Singers	Lyrics	Length (m:ss)
1	"Nagutha Naliyuva"	S. Janaki, S. P. Balasubrahmanyam	Doddarange Gowda	04:35
2	"Snehithare Nimage"	S. P. Balasubrahmanyam	R. N. Jayagopal	04:18
3	"Hayya Hayya"	S. Janaki, S. P. Balasubrahmanyam	Shyamasundara Kulkarni	04:23
4	"Ushe Moodidaaga"	S. P. Balasubrahmanyam	R. N. Jayagopal	04:34
