= Chinna Thambi Periya Thambi =

- Theatrical release poster
- Directed by: Manivannan
- Story by: Shanmuga Priyan
- Produced by: Tirupur Mani; Thara Sivakumar; K. Padmavathy; M. L. Nallamuthu; Tirupur Saravanan
- Starring: Sathyaraj; Prabhu; Nadhiya; Sudha Chandran
- Cinematography: A. Sabapathy
- Edited by: Gouthaman
- Music by: Gangai Amaran
- Production company: Chemba Creations
- Release date: 27 February 1987
- Country: India
- Language: Tamil

Chinna Thambi Periya Thambi (transl. Younger Brother, Elder Brother) is a 1987 Indian Tamil-language romantic comedy film, directed by Manivannan. The film stars Sathyaraj, Prabhu, Nadhiya and Sudha Chandran. It was released on 27 February 1987. The film was remade in Telugu as Chinnodu Peddodu and in Kannada as Ramanna Shamanna.

== Plot ==
Chinna Thambi and Periya Thambi are brothers who work in a spinning mill in Booluvampatii, on the outskirts of Coimbatore district. They live with their widowed grandmother. Though the brothers quarrel often, they are always together and love each other. Suddenly, their mother's younger brother visits them after 20 years. Both brothers fall in love with their rich uncle's daughter Kavitha and try to woo her. But Kavitha's parents deny the alliance as the brothers are neither rich nor educated. Kavitha and her family are sent out of the village by the brother's grandmother due to this refusal. She also prohibits her grandsons to visit that uncle's family on any personal cause.

Well educated and beautiful, Kavitha is initially arranged to marry a wealthy man, Mohankumar, who happens to be the heir of a rich Garments company in Tirupur, where the brothers work. Hence both of them go to Chennai to work in the wedding. On the wedding eve, Kavitha's parents meet with a big accident while on the way to the marriage hall. On his deathbed, Kavitha's father mentions about the debts he is in and both of kavitha's parents pass away. All of her properties are sold off to repay the debt and the wedding is called off as Kavitha has become poor. The brothers console and take Kavitha back to their village and she begins to appreciate their simple lifestyle, and starts to live with her cousins and her aunt. Both brothers again try to woo Kavitha. Periya Thambi even works as sandalwood-cutter to buy luxuries for Kavitha, which she rejects as private Sandalwood felling is illegal. Periya Thambi is arrested by the local police and their mother dies due to heart-attack. Periya Thambi serves a 3-month term and is released, and starts to work in a mill. Eventually, Kavitha falls in love with the honest Chinna Thambi, meanwhile Periya Thambi happens to rescue a widow Thayamma from dire straits, and falls for her.

The mill owner tries to get Kavitha as his concubine and is beaten black and blue by the brothers. Chinna Thambi is jailed for 1 month as a consequence. Periya Thambi arranges for their wedding on the day of Chinna's release, and also Thayamma's family accepts for her remarriage. But on the day of the wedding, Kavitha is kidnapped by the mill owner's son and the local landlord. Periya Thambi goes to rescue her and see the owner's son attempting to rape Kavitha. Hence he beats all of them and kills both the mill owner's son and the local landlord. This is not revealed to Kavitha and Chinna Thambi and their wedding goes on successfully. Police come to arrest Periya Thambi and he marries Thayamma and immediately surrenders to police. He is given a 10-year sentence and he completes the term. after he returns, he sees his house developed and his wife waiting. As he starts to consummate his marriage, he hears a sound and finds that only then, his brother has also decided to consummate his marriage with Kavitha. All is well.

== Cast ==
- Sathyaraj as Periya Thambi
- Prabhu as Chinna Thambi
- Nadhiya as Kavitha
- Sudha Chandran as Thayamma
- Gandhimathi as 'Alamalakari' Alamelu
- Vijayan as Aarusamy
- Nizhalgal Ravi as Murali
- T. S. Raghavendra as Shanmugam
- Varalakshmi as Lakshmi
- Usilamani as Hotel Owner Ramasamy
- Pasi Narayanan as Esakki
- Meesai Murugesan as Kumarasamy Gounder
- John Amirtharaj as Kuttyappan
- Sathyan as the boy who informs the bride's father that the groom's family has arrived

== Soundtrack ==
The entire album was composed by Gangai Amaran, except for the song "Oru Kathal Enbathu" composed by his brother Ilaiyaraaja. Manivannan had worked exclusively with composer Ilaiyaraaja on all the previous sixteen films he directed. This was the first film directed by Manivannan to feature another composer.

Song	Singers	Lyrics	Length
"Chinna Thambi Periya Thambi"	Gangai Amaran	Gangai Amaran	03:40
"En Paatta Ketta"	S. P. Balasubrahmanyam	Vairamuthu	04:21
"Mamam Ponnukku"	Malaysia Vasudevan, S. P. Balasubrahmanyam	Gangai Amaran	04:09
"Mazhayin Thuliyile"	K. S. Chithra	Vairamuthu	04:21
"Oru Aala Marathula"	K. S. Chithra	'Madhampatti' Sivakumar	04:20
"Oru Kathal"	S. P. Balasubrahmanyam, S. Janaki	Vairamuthu	04:49
"Ya Ya"	S. P. Sailaja	Gangai Amaran	04:04

== Reception ==
N. Krishnaswamy of The Indian Express wrote, "Imaginative camera work by A. Sabapathy, competent editing by Gowthaman and appropriate music by Gangai Amaran enhance the value of the film". Jayamanmadhan of Kalki wrote it would have been nice if the excitement at the beginning has lasted till the end but still the makers have mixed fighting, villainy and sentiment without making squirm in your seat till the end which itself a huge success.
