= Krishna Rukmini =

- Directed by: H. R. Bhargava
- Written by: N. T. Jayaram Reddy
- Screenplay by: H. R. Bhargava
- Produced by: Smt Suvarna Channanna
- Starring: Vishnuvardhan; Ramya Krishna; Hema Choudhary; Devaraj; Mukhyamantri Chandru
- Cinematography: D. V. Rajaram
- Edited by: K. Balu
- Music by: K. V. Mahadevan
- Production company: Sri Jayalakshmi Film Productions
- Release date: 31 August 1988
- Country: India
- Language: Kannada

Krishna Rukmini is a 1988 Indian Kannada-language film, directed by H. R. Bhargava and produced by Smt Suvarna Channanna. The film stars Vishnuvardhan, Ramya Krishna, Hema Choudhary, Devaraj and Mukhyamantri Chandru in the lead roles. The film has musical score by K. V. Mahadevan.

== Plot ==
Krishna, a travel guide, falls in love with Rukmini, a dancer. However, things take a turn when her family does not approve of their relationship.

== Cast ==
- Vishnuvardhan
- Ramya Krishna
- Vanitha Vasu
- Devaraj
- Hema Choudhary
- Mukhyamantri Chandru
- Vijay Kashi
- Mysore Lokesh
- Umashree
- Gayathri Prabhakar
- Abhinaya
- Dinesh
- Sudheer
- Phani Ramachandra

== Production ==
Some of the scenes were shot at Hampi and North Karnataka.

== Soundtrack ==
The music was composed by K. V. Mahadevan. The song "Karnatakada Ithihasadalli" attained popularity. It is rated as one of the top 10 Kannada patriotic songs by Filmibeat.

Songs
No.	Title	Playback	Length
1.	"Naa Kande Ninna Madhura"	S. P. Balasubrahmanyam, Vani Jairam	4:34
2.	"Balukaado Bangaari"	S. P. Balasubrahmanyam, Vani Jairam	4:20
3.	"Naadave Nanninda Dooradeya"	S. P. Balasubrahmanyam	4:35
4.	"Karnatakada Itihaasadali"	S. P. Balasubrahmanyam	4:29
5.	"Naada Lola Sri Krishna"	Vani Jairam	5:40
6.	"Cheluvina Chilume"	S. P. Balasubrahmanyam, Vani Jairam	4:41
