= Onti Salaga =

- Directed by: V. Somashekar
- Written by: H. V. Subba Rao
- Screenplay by: V. Somashekar
- Produced by: Halaguru Venkatesh
- Starring: Ambareesh; Tiger Prabhakar; Khushbu; Vajramuni
- Cinematography: H. G. Raju
- Edited by: Victor Yadav
- Music by: Hamsalekha
- Production company: Parvathi Pictures
- Release date: 13 September 1989
- Country: India
- Language: Kannada

Onti Salaga (transl. Lone Tusker) is a 1989 Indian Kannada film, directed by V. Somashekar and produced by Halaguru Venkatesh. The film stars Ambareesh, Tiger Prabhakar, Khushbu and Vajramuni in the lead roles. The film has musical score by Hamsalekha.

== Plot ==
The film follows a non linear narrative structure.

Forest officer Pratap (Tiger Prabhakar) manages to capture a gang of notorious criminals and saves Onti Salaga (lone tusker), which has almost drowned in a swamp. His bravery is noticed by his superior, a seemingly innocent but shrewd ranger (Vajramuni).

A constable whose partners were brutally killed by a few criminals is rescued by Onti Salaga (Ambareesh), a private detective. He also captures those criminals and gives credit to the constable who gets a promotion. He meets an arrogant young girl (Khushbu) and tames her, eventually developing feelings for her. She seeks his help in finding her kidnapped brother.

It is revealed that her rich brother (Avinash) is kidnapped and tortured by Chandra Chakravarthy (Jai Jagadish) who, pretending to be a pious bank employee, looted the building and killed the security guard making mothers believe that he was killed in the brawl. While taking the money to his boss and father, the same old ranger (Vajramuni) he is spotted by the industrialist (Avinash), whom he kidnaps and tortures for his wealth. He also hires a few bodyguards to keep an eye on the man's family.

Shankar aka Onti Salaga suspects Chandra Chakravarthy (who has changed his appearance) and starts stalking him. Meanwhile, he is recognised by Madhukar, who happens to be a close confidante of Shankar. In order to cover up his crime, Chandra Chakravarthy kills Madhukar and also attempts to murder Shankar. However, he escapes and swears to seek revenge for his friend's death. His investigation leads him to the conclusion that his girlfriend's brother (Avinash) is also in Chandra Chakravarthy's custody.

Shankar uses Chakravarthy's estranged wife and son (who believes he was killed in the robbery) to confirm his real identity. Finding this to be a real danger, he kidnaps his son from his wife's house on his father's advice. Meanwhile, Shankar saves his girlfriend's brother with the help of that old constable who is now an inspector. Having enough of Shankar, the old ranger sends goons to kill him. Although Shankar gets the upper hand, he is defeated and left to die by chaining him in his house, which the goons sets on fire. They also kidnap Shankar's girlfriend, her mother and Chakravarthy's wife so as to kill them. Here, it's revealed that Shankar is forest officer Pratap's son.

Pratap, who is a widower, lives with his son. He finds that the gang whom he caught has escaped with the help of the ranger, his superior, who surprisingly happens to be their leader. Pratap gets into a fight with them while they try to smuggle ivory and sandalwood, but gets killed by the ranger. This is witnessed by Shankar, his son.

Shankar manages to untie himself in the same way, by which Pratap saved the tusker at the beginning from drowning. Having escaped, he saves the others and kills Chandra Chakravarthy. Before killing the ranger, he reveals that he is the son of forest officer Pratap and had been searching for his father's killer. He then kills the ranger and unites with others.

== Cast ==
- Ambareesh as Shankar aka Onti Salaga
- Tiger Prabhakar (extended cameo appearance) as Pratap
- Khushbu as Leela
- Vajramuni as Rudraiah
- Jai Jagadish as Soori aka Chandra Chakravarthy
- Srinivasa Murthy as Madhukar (Guest Appearance)
- Mukhyamantri Chandru as Head Constable Halige
- Avinash as Ramesh
- Lakshman
- Prasanna
- Ravishankar
- Master Amith
- B. K. Shankar
- Shani Mahadevappa
- Ashwath Narayan
- Bangalore Nagesh
- S. L. N. Simha
- Damodar
- M. S. Karanth
- Dharanendra
- Pandari Bai
- Aparna
- Umashree
- Padma Kumata
- Disco Shanthi
- Sithara
- Sundaramma
- Baby Akshaya
- Baby Savitha
