= List of Kannada films of 1990 =

== Top-grossing films ==
Rank	Title	Collection	Ref.
1.	Muthina Haara	₹5 crore (₹51.33 crore in 2025)	
2.	Rani Maharani	₹3.75 crore (₹38.5 crore in 2025)	
3.	Abhimanyu	₹3.5 crore (₹35.93 crore in 2025)	
4.	Aasegobba Meesegobba	₹3 crore (₹30.79 crore in 2025)	
5.	Nammoora Hammeera	₹2 crore (₹15.39 crore in 2025	

== List ==
The following is a list of films produced in the Kannada film industry in India in 1990, presented in alphabetical order.

Title	Director	Cast	Music
Aasegobba Meesegobba	M. S. Rajashekar	Shiva Rajkumar, Raghavendra Rajkumar, Sudharani, Shruti	Upendra Kumar
Aata Bombata	B. C. Gowrishankar	Shankar Nag, Srilatha, Thoogudeepa Srinivas, Ramakrishna	Hamsalekha
Aavesha	Peraala	Shankar Nag, Devaraj, Geetha, Bhavya, Ramkumar, Doddanna, Shivaranjini	Hamsalekha
Abhimanyu	Ravi Raja Pinisetty	V. Ravichandran, Ananth Nag, Seetha, Sudharani	Hamsalekha
Agni Divya	V. Raajan	Jai Jagadish, Bhavya, Tara	Shyam
Ajay Vijay	A. T. Raghu	Murali, Raghuveer, Aneetha, Chitra, Srinath, Jaggesh	Yuvaraj
Amrutha Bindu	Hamshi	Raviraj, Tara, Abhinaya, Dinesh	Vijaya Bhaskar
Anantha Prema	T. Janardhan	Ananth Nag, Vanitha Vasu, Abhilasha, Umashri	Hamsalekha
Anukoolakkobba Ganda	M. S. Rajashekar	Raghavendra Rajkumar, Vidhyashree, Lokesh	Upendra Kumar
Ashoka Chakra	B Ramamurthy	Tiger Prabhakar, Shashikumar, Sudharani, Doddanna	Manoranjan Prabhakar
Ashwamedha	C. R. Simha	Kumar Bangarappa, Keerthi, Geetanjali, Srinath, Srividya	Sangeetha Raja
Baare Nanna Muddina Rani	Siddalingaiah	Shashikumar, Mahalakshmi, Umashri, K. S. Ashwath	Rajan–Nagendra
Bannada Gejje	Rajendra Singh Babu	V. Ravichandran, Amala, Bharathi Vishnuvardhan, Amjad Khan, Suresh Heblikar	Hamsalekha
Bhale Chathura	Om Sai Prakash	Shankar Nag, Chandrika, B. Saroja Devi, Srinivasa Murthy	Upendra Kumar
Chakra	Sundar Krishna Urs	Tara, Girija Lokesh, Gayathri Prabhakar, Rajashekar Kadamba	Seetharama Raju
Chakravarthy	D. Rajendra Babu	Ambareesh, Karishma, Sharat Saxena, Lokanath	Shankar–Ganesh
Challenge	Raj Kishor	Tiger Prabhakar, Shashikumar, Sridhar, Srilatha, Tara	Hamsalekha
Challenge Gopalakrishna	Om Sai Prakash	Ananth Nag, Ashwini, M. S. Umesh, Doddanna, Mukhyamantri Chandru	Upendra Kumar
Chapala Chennigaraya	H. R. Bhargava	Kashinath, Kalpana, Vanitha Vasu	Rajan–Nagendra
College Hero	Chandrahasa	Vinod Raj, Madhushri, Anjali, Abhijeeth, Shivaranjini, Vinaya Prasad	Hamsalekha
Ekalavya	Srikanth Nahata	Ambareesh, Jaya Pradha, Srinath	Sangeetha Raja
Ganeshana Maduve	Phani Ramachandra	Ananth Nag, Vinaya Prasad, Mukhyamantri Chandru, Ramesh Bhat, Vaishali Kasaravalli	Rajan–Nagendra
Golmaal Radhakrishna	Om Sai Prakash	Ananth Nag, Chandrika, Vanitha Vasu, Leelavathi, Mukhyamantri Chandru	M. Ranga Rao
Halliya Surasuraru	Tiptur Raghu	Shankar Nag, Ramakrishna, Bhavya, Sudharani	M. Ranga Rao
Hosa Jeevana	H. R. Bhargava	Shankar Nag, Deepika Chikhalia, Ramesh Bhat	Hamsalekha
Ivalentha Hendthi	G. K. Mudduraj	Ananth Nag, Mahalakshmi, Tara, Mukhyamantri Chandru	Upendra Kumar
Kadina Hakki	Shankar Sugathe	Shashibhushana, Ajay, Kalyani, Vasanth Nakoda, Sarvamangala	Lakshminarayana Goochi
Kaliyuga Krishna	Pervodi	Kashinath, Amrutha, Tara	Shankar–Ganesh
Kempu Gulabi	Vijay	Ramesh Aravind, Ambareesh, Parijatha, Abhinaya	Hamsalekha
Kempu Surya	A. T. Raghu	Ambareesh, Suman Ranganathan, M. P. Shankar	Rajan–Nagendra
Kiladi Thata	Sundarnath Suvarna	Tiger Prabhakar, C. R. Simha, Tara, Sithara	Shankar–Ganesh
Love Letter	K. Sukumaran	Arun Govil, Sangeeta Naik, Brinda	Bombay Ravi
Maheshwara	Dinesh Babu	Shankar Nag, Sumalatha, Srinath, Tara	Vijay Anand
Mathsara	K. V. Jayaram	Ambareesh, Rajani, Bharathi, Jai Jagadish	Sangeetha Raja
Mathe Haditu Kogile	H. R. Bhargava	Vishnuvardhan, Ananth Nag, Bhavya, Roopini, Baby Shamili	Rajan–Nagendra
Mruthyunjaya	Chi. Dattaraj	Shiva Rajkumar, Malashri, Shashikumar	Upendra Kumar
Muraligana Amruthapana	Kodlu Ramakrishna	Ananth Nag, Sudha Chandran, Tara, Ramakrishna	Vijaya Bhaskar
Muthina Haara	Rajendra Singh Babu	Vishnuvardhan, Suhasini Maniratnam, K. S. Ashwath, Ramkumar	Hamsalekha
Nammoora Hammera	Peraala	Ambareesh, Suman Ranganathan, Umashree, Mukhyamantri Chandru, Devaraj	Hamsalekha
Neene Nanna Jeeva	T. Janardhan	Balaraj, Amrutha, Tara, Vanitha Vasu	Manoranjan Prabhakar
Nigooda Rahasya	Peraala	Shankar Nag, Geetha, Tara, Vanitha Vasu	Hamsalekha
Panchama Veda	P. H. Vishwanath	Ramesh Aravind, Sudharani, Ramakrishna	Sangeetha Raja
Poli Kitty	K. V. Jayaram	Kashinath, Devaraj, Manjula Sharma, Lokanath	Sangeetha Raja
Policena Hendthi	Om Sai Prakash	Shashikumar, Devaraj, Malashri, Vinaya Prasad	M. Ranga Rao
Prathama Ushakirana	Suresh Heblikar	Girish Karnad, Geetha, Suresh Heblikar, Vanitha Vasu	Vijaya Bhaskar
Prathap	V. Somashekhar	Arjun Sarja, Malashri, Sudharani	Hamsalekha
Pundara Ganda	P. Raju	Ananth Nag, Prabhakar, Vajramuni	Satyam
Raja Kempu Roja	S. Umesh	Tiger Prabhakar, Malashri, Tara	Upendra Kumar
Ramarajyadalli Rakshasaru	D. Rajendra Babu	Shankar Nag, Ananth Nag, Shashikumar, Sonika Gill, Gayathri	M. Ranga Rao
Ranabheri	V. Somashekar	Ambareesh, Tiger Prabhakar, Vani Viswanath, Chandrika	Upendra Kumar
Rani Maharani	B Ramamurthy	Ambareesh, Malashri, Shashikumar, Doddanna, Jaggesh	Hamsalekha
Rudra Thandava	B Ramamurthy	Balaraj, Shashikumar, Bhagyashree	Upendra Kumar
Santha Shishunala Sharifa	T. S. Nagabharana	Sridhar, Girish Karnad, Suman Ranganathan	C. Ashwath
Shabarimale Swamy Ayyappa	Renuka Sharma	Srinivasa Murthy, Sridhar, Sudharani, Geetha, Master Sanjay, Ramakrishna	K. V. Mahadevan
Shivashankar	H. R. Bhargava	Vishnuvardhan, Shobhana, Doddanna, Ramesh Bhat	Rajan–Nagendra
Shruthi	Dwarakish	Sunil, Shruti, Indudhar, Shrivatsa, Dileep, Honnavalli Krishna	S. A. Rajkumar
Sididedda Gandu	S. Umesh	Tiger Prabhakar, Vani Viswanath, Jai Jagadish, Tara, Sudharshan	Hamsalekha
S. P. Sangliyana Part 2	P. Nanjundappa	Shankar Nag, Bhavya, Devaraj, Ashok, Shivaranjini	Hamsalekha
Sri Satyanarayana Pooja Phala	Dhananjaya	Kalyan Kumar, Rajesh, Jayanthi, Bhavya, Jai Jagadish	M. Ranga Rao
Swarna Samsara	Om Sai Prakash	Ananth Nag, Mahalakshmi, Avinash, Mukhyamantri Chandru	Upendra Kumar
Tiger Gangu	Sundarnath Suvarna	Tiger Prabhakar, Pavithra, Leelavathi, Mamatha Rao	Shankar–Ganesh
Trinetra	Raj Kishore	Shashikumar, Tiger Prabhakar, Devaraj, Chandrika, Sudharani, Vijayalakshmi Singh, Jaggesh	Hamsalekha
Udbhava	Kodlu Ramakrishna	Ananth Nag, Mamatha Rao, K. S. Ashwath	Mysore Gopi
Utkarsha	Sunil Kumar Desai	Ambareesh, Devaraj, Abhilasha, Vanitha Vasu	Guna Singh

== See also ==
- Kannada films of 1989
- Kannada films of 1991
