= Chandanada Gombe =

- Title card
- Directed by: Dorai–Bhagavan
- Screenplay by: Dorai–Bhagavan
- Based on: Chandanada Gombe by T. R. Subba Rao
- Produced by: N. Bhaktavatsalam; N. Ramachandra; Dorairaj; S. K. Bhagavan
- Starring: Anant Nag; Lakshmi; Lokesh
- Cinematography: R. Chittibabu
- Edited by: P. Bhaktavatsalam
- Music by: Rajan–Nagendra
- Production company: Sri Manthralaya Art Movies
- Distributed by: Anupam Padmashree Movies; Kushtagi Films; Sree Venkateshwara Movies
- Release date: 22 September 1979
- Running time: 147 minutes
- Country: India
- Language: Kannada

Chandanada Gombe ( transl. Doll of Sandalwood) is a 1979 Indian Kannada-language film directed by Dorai–Bhagavan, and is based on the novel of the same name written by T. R. Subba Rao. The film stars Anant Nag, Lakshmi and Lokesh. It was a musical blockbuster with all the songs composed by Rajan–Nagendra considered evergreen hits. Chandanada Gombe repeated the success of the earlier movie Na Ninna Bidalaare where Anant Nag and Lakshmi acted together for the first time. The success of the movie made Anant Nag and Lakshmi a household names across Karnataka. The film was remade in Telugu as Ramapuramlo Seetha starring Sujatha in the title role.

== Plot ==
Chandanada Gombe is a simple love story. Anant Nag is a village accountant. Lakshmi's father is a school teacher who is struggling to find a bridegroom for Lakshmi. They get married with the help of mutual relatives. Anant Nag unfortunately dies in an accident. The rest of the story is about the life of a struggling widow and her child in a traditional society amid village politics.

== Cast ==
- Anant Nag as Seetharamu
- Lakshmi as Ratna
- Lokesh as Chinobha
- Sampath as Srinivasaiah, Seetharamu's Maternal Uncle
- Advani Lakshmi Devi as Kamalamma, Srinivasaiah's Wife
- K. S. Ashwath as Lakshman Rao, Ratna's Father
- Savitri as Sita, Ratna's Mother
- Shanthamma as Chinobha’s Grand Mother
- Uma Shivakumar as Eeramma, Shop-keeper
- Sundar Raj as Raghavendra, Seetharamu's Cousin
- Mysore Lokesh as Vithobha

== Soundtrack ==
The film score and soundtrack were composed by Rajan–Nagendra, with its lyrics penned by Chi. Udaya Shankar. The soundtrack album consists of four tracks. The songs 'Aakashadinda Dheregilida Rambhe', 'Ee Binka Bidu Bidu' and 'Maneyanu Belagide Indu' were received extremely well and are considered as evergreen songs.

Track listing
No.	Title	Lyrics	Singer(s)	Length
1.	"Aakashadinda Dheregilida Rambhe"	Chi. Udaya Shankar	S. P. Balasubrahmanyam	4:29
2.	"Ee Binka Bidu Bidu"	Chi. Udaya Shankar	S. P. Balasubrahmanyam, S. Janaki	4:25
3.	"Maneyanu Belagide Indu"	Chi. Udaya Shankar	S. P. Balasubrahmanyam, S. Janaki	4:39
4.	"Kangalu Thumbiralu"	Chi. Udaya Shankar	S. Janaki	5:01
Total length:				18:34

== Awards ==
Karnataka State Film Awards

- Third Best Film
- Best supporting actress — Uma Shivakumar
