= Olavina Aasare =

- Directed by: K. V. Jayaram
- Written by: Tanuja (Sowndryavalli)
- Produced by: K. V. Jayaram
- Starring: Vishnuvardhan; Rupini; Sudha Chandran
- Cinematography: R. C. Mapakshi
- Edited by: S. Manohar
- Music by: M. Ranga Rao
- Production company: Jayadurga Combines
- Release date: 1988
- Running time: 154 minutes
- Country: India
- Language: Kannada

Olavina Aasare is a 1988 Indian Kannada-language film directed and produced by K. V. Jayaram. The film stars Vishnuvardhan, Rupini and Sudha Chandran. The music was composed by M. Ranga Rao and the dialogues and lyrics were written by Kunigal Vasanth and Doddarangegowda.

The film is based on a novel with the same title, written by Tanuja.

== Cast ==
- Vishnuvardhan as Jayanth
- Rupini as Rajni
- Sudha Chandran
- Aparna
- Loknath
- Sudheer
- Lohithaswa
- Mysore Lokesh
- Dingri Nagaraj
- Anuradha

== Soundtrack ==
All songs were composed by M. Ranga Rao for the lyrics of Doddarangegowda. The soundtrack was successful upon release.

- "Kanasali Manasali" – S. P. Balasubrahmanyam, Vani Jairam
- "Ramananthe Nema" – S. P. Balasubrahmanyam
- "Sahasa Simha Endigu" – S. P. Balasubrahmanyam
- "Swapna Soudha" – Vani Jairam
- "Baa Raja Baa" – Vani Jairam
- "Sahasa Simhanu Bandanu" – Vani Jairam
