= Jeevana Jyothi (1987 film) =

- Directed by: P. Vasu
- Written by: P. Vasu
- Screenplay by: P. Vasu
- Produced by: Vijaya Shankar Bhat
- Starring: Vishnuvardhan; Ambika
- Cinematography: M. C. Shekar
- Edited by: P. Venkateshwara Rao
- Music by: Vijay Anand
- Production companies: Devi & Devi Films
- Release date: 10 August 1987
- Country: India
- Language: Kannada

Jeevana Jyothi ( transl. Light of life) is a 1987 Indian Kannada-language drama film, directed by P. Vasu and produced by Vijaya Shankar Bhat. The film stars Vishnuvardhan and Ambika in the lead roles. Srinivasa Murthy, Sridhar and Nalini appear in supporting roles. The film has musical score by Vijay Anand. The film was dubbed into Malayalam, with the title Samarppanam.

== Plot ==
Ravi and Radha are co-passengers in a bus. Ravi fights off Radha's molester and wins her trust. He helps find her brother's house in the city they have travelled to. However, her brother Venkatesh Murthy has vacated the house two months prior, leaving Radha nowhere to go. Ravi takes her to his residence where he is residing as a paying guest. He is very close towards the family, consisting of a couple and their son, living there, and has brotherly affection towards the lady of the house. Ravi and Radha fall in love with each other as time passes.

Ravi, however, is unemployed and is constantly looking for a job. He is hired as driver of a commercial vehicle, but is fired on the first day after he expels the customers for illegally carrying marijuana in the vehicle's trunk. A turn of events lead him to being hired by Murthy, who is a wealthy businessman. Murthy employs Ravi to run a truck for him on rental basis. Ravi comes good at this job, expand the business, and founds a company that rents out more trucks, and appoints his friend Arun as the manager.

Sometime later, Ravi has to visit Mumbai to attend a business meeting. A turn of events lead him to find out he is suffering from blood cancer. Upon his return to the city, Ravi's demeanor towards Radha has changed and is seen getting closer to Meena, his new personal secretary, apparently to distance himself from a confused and jealous Radha. He reveals only to Meena of the disease and asks her to keep it a secret. However, Murthy learns of this and inadvertently tells Radha about it. Radha runs to Ravi, whose health has deteriorated further, in a wedding dress and requests him to tie the sacred thread around her neck. Ravi does so resulting in their marriage, before she dies in his arms.

== Cast ==
- Vishnuvardhan as K. Ravi
- Ambika as Radha
- Nalini as Meena
- Srinivasa Murthy as Venkatesh Murthy
- Dinesh as owner of Ravi's paying guest house
- Rajanand as Ranganna
- Shubha as Seetha
- Pushpalatha as owner of Ravi's paying guest house
- Vijayaranjini
- Sujitha (credited as Baby Sujitha) as Murthy's daughter
- Shani Mahadevappa as Ravi's butler
- B. Hanumanthachar
- Mysore Lokesh as owner of rental vehicle
- Sridhar as Arun
- Sudheer as Radha's molester in bus

== Soundtrack ==
The music was composed by Vijay Anand.

No.	Song	Singers	Lyrics	Length (m:ss)
1	"Yeko Hosa Aase"	S. P. Balasubrahmanyam, Vani Jayaram	Chi. Udaya Shankar	
2	"Baredide Ninna"	S. P. Balasubrahmanyam, S. Janaki	R. N. Jayagopal	
3	"Aatavu Chanda"	S. P. Balasubrahmanyam, K. S. Chithra	Chi. Udaya Shankar	
4	"Haaraduva Ee Jeevake"	S. P. Balasubrahmanyam	R. N. Jayagopal	
