= Ramanna Shamanna =

- VCD cover
- Directed by: B. Subba Rao
- Story by: Shanmugha Priyan
- Based on: Chinna Thambi Periya Thambi (1987) by Manivannan
- Produced by: S. P. Rajashekar
- Starring: Ambareesh; V. Ravichandran; Madhavi; Geetha
- Cinematography: P. N. Sundaram
- Edited by: V. Balasubramanyam; Shivashankar
- Music by: S. P. Balasubrahmanyam
- Production company: Vasu Chithra
- Release date: 1988
- Running time: 136 minutes
- Country: India
- Language: Kannada

Ramanna Shamanna is a 1988 Indian Kannada-language action drama film, written by Shanmugha Priyan and directed by B. Subba Rao. The film had an ensemble cast including Ambareesh, V. Ravichandran, Madhavi, Geetha and Devaraj, while many other prominent actors featured in supporting roles. The soundtrack and score composition was by popular singer S. P. Balasubrahmanyam and the lyrics along with the dialogues were written by Chi. Udaya Shankar. The film was a remake of Tamil film Chinna Thambi Periya Thambi.

== Cast ==
- Ambareesh as Rama
- V. Ravichandran as Shyam
- Madhavi
- Geetha
- Devaraj
- Leelavathi
- Umashri
- Thoogudeepa Srinivas
- Ramesh Bhat
- Sundar Krishna Urs
- N. S. Rao
- Sudheer
- Mysore Lokesh
- Honnavalli Krishna

== Soundtrack ==
The music was composed by S. P. Balasubrahmanyam, with lyrics by Chi. Udaya Shankar.

Track listing
No.	Title	Lyrics	Singer(s)	Length
1.	"Entha Anandavo Rama"	Chi. Udaya Shankar	S. P. Balasubrahmanyam
2.	"Cheluve Olave"	Chi. Udaya Shankar	S. P. Balasubrahmanyam, Vani Jairam
3.	"Hosa Bage Udupu"	Chi. Udaya Shankar	S. P. Sailaja
4.	"Idu Enu Rabba"	Chi. Udaya Shankar	S. P. Balasubrahmanyam
5.	"Adhara Adhara Kalethaga"	Chi. Udaya Shankar	S. P. Balasubrahmanyam, Vani Jairam
