= December 31 (film) =

- Title card
- Directed by: Manobala
- Written by: H. V. Subba Rao (dialogues)
- Screenplay by: Manobala
- Story by: Madhu
- Produced by: P. Padmanabham
- Starring: Vishnuvardhan; Urvashi; Jai Jagadish; Sulakshana
- Cinematography: B. R. Vijayalakshmi
- Edited by: Goutham
- Music by: Satyam
- Production company: Makkal Thilakam Pictures
- Release date: 9 October 1986
- Running time: 139 minutes
- Country: India
- Language: Kannada

December 31 is a 1986 Indian Kannada-language film, directed by Manobala, in his only Kannada film. The film stars Vishnuvardhan, Urvashi, Jai Jagadish and Sulakshana.

== Cast ==
- Vishnuvardhan as Raja Veer
- Urvashi as Radha
- Jai Jagadish
- Sulakshana
- Pavithra
- Anuradha in Guest Appearance
- M. V. Vasudeva Rao
- Mysore Lokesh
- Lakshman
- Shashivardhan
- Ravichandra
- Madhu
- Chinni Prakash
- Lohithaswa
- V. R. Bhaskar
- Seetharam
- Dr. Rudresh
- Ashwath Narayan
- Meese Krishna
- Ranga
- Janardhan
- Sathyabhama
- Seema

== Production ==
Chinni Jayanth, in an interview said this was his first Kannada film and he was reluctant to act as he did not know the language. He acted in the film due to insistence by the director Manobala who himself did not know Kannada. During acting, Chinni Jayanth used to deliver the first two lines and ending of his dialogue in Kannada and the rest in Tamil. The dubbing artist who dubbed for Chinni Jayanth had a tough time to sync the dialogue in Kannada. This was the only Kannada film directed by Manobala.

== Soundtrack ==
The music was composed by Satyam. The lyrics for the songs were written by R. N. Jayagopal.

Song	Singer(s)
"Mellage Helale Kiviyali Guttu"	S. Janaki
"Mana Nindayithu"	Raj Sitharam & S. Janaki
"Balige Baa"	Raj Sitharam & S. Janaki
"Naa Varavawu Beduve"	S. Janaki & P. Sushila
