= Hrudaya Geethe =

- VCD cover
- Directed by: H. R. Bhargava
- Written by: Phani Ramachandra; Kunigal Nagabhushan (dialogues)
- Screenplay by: H. R. Bhargava
- Produced by: H. R. Bhargava
- Starring: Vishnuvardhan; Bhavya; Khushbu; Sridhar
- Cinematography: D. V. Rajaram
- Edited by: Yadav Victor
- Music by: Rajan–Nagendra
- Production company: Kalakruthi
- Release date: 9 February 1989
- Running time: 143 minutes
- Country: India
- Language: Kannada

Hrudaya Geethe ( transl. Heart song) is a 1989 Indian Kannada-language romance film directed and produced by H. R. Bhargava. The story by Phani Ramachandra was loosely based on the 1970 movie Pagla Kahin Ka. The film stars Vishnuvardhan, Bhavya and Khushbu.

== Plot ==
Ashok, a mentally disturbed man, is accused of murder. According to the court's order, he is sent to a mental asylum. Aruna, his childhood friend, who is also his doctor, decides to help him. Ashok reveals that he is pretending to be mentally ill for the sake of his lover Asha. Asha, an athlete, has accidentally murdered her house owner for misbehaving with her. In order to save her reputation, Ashok has taken blame for the murder and is pretending to be mentally ill. Ashok is released from the asylum but on seeing Asha marry someone else, he becomes mad for real and is re-admitted to the asylum. Aruna takes charge and seeks the married Asha's help to make Ashok realize the reality and so he recovers from his illness. Eventually Ashok is cured and he also exposes the illegal activities being carried out in the asylum by Aruna's father and fiancé.

== Cast ==
- Vishnuvardhan as Ashok
- Bhavya as Aruna
- Khushbu as Asha
- Sridhar
- Balakrishna
- Umashree
- Devaraj
- Mukhyamantri Chandru
- Maanu
- Ramesh Bhat
- Sihi Kahi Chandru
- Sudheer
- Mysore Lokesh
- Dinesh

== Soundtrack ==
The music of the film was composed by Rajan–Nagendra. The songs "Yuga Yugagale Saagali" and title song "Hrudaya Geethe Haaduthire" were received extremely well.

Track listing
No.	Title	Lyrics	Singer(s)	Length
1.	"Yuga Yugagale Saagali"	M. N. Vyasa Rao	S. P. Balasubrahmanyam, K. S. Chithra
2.	"Preethiya Mathannu"	Shyamasundara Kulkarni	S. P. Balasubrahmanyam, Vani Jayaram
3.	"Ee Kade Burma Bazar"	Geethapriya	S. P. Balasubrahmanyam
4.	"Premanuraga Baalalli"	Rudramurthy Shastry	S. P. Balasubrahmanyam
5.	"Hrudaya Geethe Haaduthire"	Doddarangegowda	S. P. Balasubrahmanyam, K. S. Chithra
