= Avan (1985 film) =

1985 film

- Directed by: Chozha Rajan
- Produced by: K. R. Kannan
- Starring: Arjun; Ilavarasi
- Music by: Shankar–Ganesh
- Production company: K.R.K. Art Films
- Release date: 12 October 1985
- Country: India
- Language: Tamil

Avan (transl. Him) is a 1985 Indian Tamil-language film, directed by Chozha Rajan and produced by K. R. Kannan. The film stars Arjun and Ilavarasi. It was released on 12 October 1985.

== Cast ==
- Arjun as Johnny
- Ilavarasi as Priya
- Senthil
- Vinu Chakravarthy
- Jaishankar as Chakravarthy
- Senthamarai
- S. S. Chandran
- Loose Mohan
- Kumari Muthu
- Anuradha as Special appearance

== Soundtrack ==
The music was composed by Shankar–Ganesh, with lyrics by Vairamuthu.

| Song | Singers | Length |
|---|---|---|
| "Avan Manasu Thangam" 1 | Malaysia Vasudevan | 04:24 |
| "Avan Manasu Thangam" 2 | Malaysia Vasudevan | 04:24 |
| "Poovae Unnai Kattikondu" | S. P. Balasubrahmanyam, S. Janaki | 04:17 |
| "Naal Paarthu Vanthen" | Malaysia Vasudevan, S. Janaki | 04:46 |
| "Konja Vayasudha Kozhandha" | Malaysia Vasudevan, S. Janaki | 04:40 |

== Reception ==
Jayamanmadhan of Kalki felt the film can be advertised as a film imposed with too many spicy ingredients like karate, love, affection and tears but praised the director for keeping the screenplay organised.
