= Olavu Moodidaga =

- Directed by: B. Mallesh
- Written by: M. D. Sundar
- Produced by: Mohan Sharma
- Starring: Anant Nag; Lakshmi; Ramakrishna; Leelavathi
- Cinematography: R. Chittibabu; C. Mahendra
- Edited by: M. Umanath; M. Mani
- Music by: Rajan–Nagendra
- Production company: Varalakshmi Movies
- Release date: 1984
- Running time: 142 minutes
- Country: India
- Language: Kannada

Olavu Moodidaga is a 1984 Kannada-language film directed by B. Mallesh and produced by Mohan Sharma. The story was written by M. D. Sundar. The film stars Anant Nag, Lakshmi, Ramakrishna and Leelavathi.

The film's score and songs were composed by Rajan–Nagendra, whilst the dialogues and lyrics were written by Chi. Udaya Shankar.

== Cast ==
- Anant Nag
- Lakshmi as Bharathi
- Ramakrishna as Prabhu
- Dinesh as Subbanna
- Leelavathi
- Sundar Krishna Urs as Venkateshaiah
- Mysore Lokesh
- Musuri Krishnamurthy
- Lohithaswa
- Shashikala as Radhika
- Mandeep Roy

== Soundtrack ==
The music was composed by the Rajan–Nagendra duo, with lyrics by Chi. Udaya Shankar.

Track listing
No.	Title	Singer(s)	Length
1.	"Aadi Lakshmi Gaja Lakshmi"	S. P. Balasubrahmanyam	04:32
2.	"Manasu Kelide"	S. P. Balasubrahmanyam, S. Janaki	04:21
3.	"Elle Nodu Ene Maadu"	S. P. Balasubrahmanyam, S. Janaki	04:26
4.	"Buddhi Maatha Keli"	S. Janaki	04:28
