= Shubha Milana =

- VCD cover
- Directed by: H. R. Bhargava
- Screenplay by: Bhargava
- Produced by: N. Mamatha; N. Indukala
- Starring: Vishnuvardhan; Ambika; Uday; Nagesh Yadav
- Cinematography: D. V. Rajaram
- Edited by: Shivachandran
- Music by: M. Ranga Rao
- Production company: Sreedevi Art Pictures
- Release date: 10 September 1987
- Country: India
- Language: Kannada

Shubha Milana (Kannada: ಶುಭಮಿಲನ) is a 1987 Indian Kannada film, directed by H. R. Bhargava and produced by N. Mamatha and N. Indukala. The film stars Vishnuvardhan and Ambika in lead roles. This movie ran for more than 100 days and became a hit at the boxoffice. The film has musical score by M. Ranga Rao. The film is a remake of the Telugu movie Aalu Magalu (1977).

== Cast ==
- Vishnuvardhan as Doctor Ravi
- Ambika as Ganga
- Uday Huttinagedde
- Nagesh Yadav
- K. S. Ashwath
- Ramesh Bhat
- Pramila Joshai
- Tara
- Sudha Narasimharaju
- Anuradha
- Rajanand
- Dinesh
- Mysore Lokesh
- Jyothi
- Shobha
- Master Sandesh
- Phani Ramachandra

== Soundtrack ==
All music is composed by M. Ranga Rao.

Songs
No.	Title	Playback	Length
1.	"Milana Milana"	S. Janaki, S. P. Balasubrahmanyam	4:04
2.	"Ee Chanchale Kuniyuvanthe"	S. Janaki, S. P. Balasubrahmanyam	6:01
3.	"Baalu Pranaya Geethe"	S. Janaki, S. P. Balasubrahmanyam	4:55
4.	"Krishnana Haage"	S. Janaki, S. P. Balasubrahmanyam	4:31
5.	"Geleya Heege"	S. Janaki, S. P. Balasubrahmanyam	4:33
6.	"Ninnaaseya Preethiya Hoovu"	S. P. Balasubrahmanyam	4:31
