= Ondu Muttina Kathe =

- Film poster
- Directed by: Shankar Nag
- Screenplay by: Shankar Nag
- Produced by: A. Dwarakanath; A. Ramadas; A. S. Murthy; D. K. K. Prasad
- Starring: Rajkumar; Archana
- Cinematography: B. C. Gowrishankar
- Edited by: P. Bhaktavatsalam
- Music by: L. Vaidyanathan
- Production company: Padmashree Enterprises
- Distributed by: Vajreshwari Combines
- Release date: 1987
- Country: India
- Language: Kannada

Ondu Muttina Kathe (transl. Story of a Pearl) is a 1987 Indian Kannada language film directed by Shankar Nag, starring Rajkumar and Archana. It is based on John Steinbeck's 1947 novella The Pearl. This was the last directorial of Shankar Nag. It is also the only movie in which he directed Rajkumar, making him the youngest person to direct him.

The movie was not very successful but is still remembered for its screenplay and technical superiority. It is considered one of the cult classic movies in the history of Kannada cinema.

The film is notable for the underwater fighting sequence by Rajkumar at the age of 58 with a London-made artificial octopus shot in the Maldives ocean with a Canadian camera by a German cameraman. It was the first Indian film to have an underwater action sequence shot in an ocean outside India without the help of oxygen mask.

== Premise ==
The movie narrates the tale of Aithu, a pearl diver, who has to face many problems when he decides to sell a precious pearl which he finds in the ocean.

== Cast ==
- Rajkumar as Aithu
- Archana as Kaaki, Aithu's wife
- Shivaram as Abutajja
- Mukhyamantri Chandru as Mahabala, a merchant
- Doddanna as Doctor
- T. N. Balakrishna as Narasimha Swami, a priest
- Ramesh Bhat as Kutta
- L. S. Sudhindra
- Ashok Badaradinni as Doctor's Assistant
- Thoogudeepa Srinivas as Bollanna, Aithu's brother
- Sundar Raj as Dhooma, Aithu's friend
- Kamani Dharan as Bollanna's wife

== Production ==
The film was shot across at Karwar, Gokarna beach, St. Mary's Island and Charmadi Ghat.

== Reception ==
Shankar had confessed in an interview that he had failed to break Rajkumar's image but was satisfied that an effort was made to tamper with the star system and appreciated Rajkumar for being co-operative in this cause by appearing in a role which was not typical. Riding on high expectations, Ondu Muttina Kathe received mixed response upon release. However, it ended up doubling its investment. It had the lowest share for a Dr Raj movie in the 1980s. The movie just ran for 7 weeks (less than 50 days) in the main theatre which again was the lowest for a Dr Rajkumar movie in the 1980s putting the then lowest Nee Nanna Gellalare (63 day) to the second position. Ondu Muttina Kathe has achieved cult status which in turn is evident from it being frequently shown on Udaya TV. It is considered one of the most technically advanced films of the 1980s era of Indian cinema.

== Soundtrack ==
Ondu Muttina Kathe

Soundtrack album by L. Vaidyanathan
- Released: 1987
- Genre: Feature film soundtrack
- Label: Sangeetha

L. Vaidyanathan composed the background score for the film and the soundtracks. Lyrics for the soundtracks were penned by Chi. Udaya Shankar. The album consists of five soundtracks. This was the first film where Sadhu Kokila worked as keyboard player.

Tracklist
No.	Title	Lyrics	Singer(s)	Length
1.	"Mutthonda Thande"	Chi. Udaya Shankar	Dr. Rajkumar, Rathnamala Prakash	05:57
2.	"Mallige Hoovinanthe"	Chi. Udaya Shankar	Dr. Rajkumar, Rathnamala Prakash	04:47
3.	"Mutthondu Bandaithu"	Chi. Udaya Shankar	C. Ashwath	03:57
4.	"Ondu Eradu"	Chi. Udaya Shankar	Dr. Rajkumar, Sunil Raoh, Sowmya Raoh	04:03
5.	"Melinda Hunnime Chandra"	Chi. Udaya Shankar	Dr. Rajkumar, Shankar Nag	04:30
