= Poli Huduga =

- Directed by: S. S. Ravichandra
- Story by: Paruchuri Brothers
- Produced by: K. Janakiram
- Starring: V. Ravichandran; Karishma; Tara
- Cinematography: B. Purushottham
- Edited by: Suresh Urs
- Music by: Hamsalekha
- Production company: Sri Productions
- Release date: 19 September 1989
- Running time: 139 minutes
- Country: India
- Language: Kannada

Poli Huduga (transl. Rogue boy) is a 1989 Kannada-language action drama film written by Paruchuri Brothers and directed by S. S. Ravichandra. The film cast includes V. Ravichandran, Karishma, Tara and Devaraj, while many other prominent actors featured in supporting roles. The soundtrack and score composition was by Hamsalekha. The film was a remake of Telugu film Kaliyuga Pandavulu.

== Cast ==
- V. Ravichandran as Vijay Kumar
- Karishma
- Tara
- Devaraj
- Thoogudeepa Srinivas
- Jaggesh
- Mukhyamantri Chandru
- Doddanna
- Sundar Krishna Urs
- Umashri
- Avinash
- Dinesh
- Mysore Lokesh
- Jyothi

== Soundtrack ==
The music was composed and lyrics written by Hamsalekha and audio was bought by Lahari Music.

Track listing
No.	Title	Lyrics	Singer(s)	Length
1.	"Yaaru Poli"	Hamsalekha	S. P. Balasubrahmanyam, Manjula Gururaj
2.	"Aa Suryana Sutthodu"	Hamsalekha	S. P. Balasubrahmanyam, Vani Jairam
3.	"Kuhu Kuhu Kogile"	Hamsalekha	S. P. Balasubrahmanyam, Lata Hamsalekha
4.	"Janana Marana"	Hamsalekha	S. P. Balasubrahmanyam
5.	"Jokumarane"	Hamsalekha	S. P. Balasubrahmanyam, Vani Jairam
6.	"Mugiyitu Aa Kaalavu"	Hamsalekha	S. P. Balasubrahmanyam
