= Negro Johnny =

Indian actor and stunt co-ordinator (1959-2007)

Johnny
- Born: Olakengal Thomas Lazar; 22 December 1959; India
- Died: 30 August 2007 (aged 47); Bangalore, Karnataka, India
- Occupations: Actor; stunt co-ordinator

Olakengal Thomas Lazar (22 December 1959 – 30 August 2007), known professionally as Negro Johnny, was an Indian actor and stunt co-ordinator in the Kannada film industry. His film credits include Samyuktha (1988), Gajapathi Garvabhanga (1989) and S. P. Sangliyana Part 2 (1990).

== Biography ==
Johnny was born as Lazar into a Kerala-based Christian family. His father, Thomas, moved to Bangalore in the 1960s in search of employment, with Johnny. Thomas worked as a bus driver, for the Bangalore Transport Service, and was a senior colleague to future actor Rajinikanth.

Johnny completed schooling in APS School, and dropped out during junior college. He performed odd jobs later, before being offered a role in S. Ramanathan and Shivaram's 1979 film, Nanobba Kalla, headlined by Dr. Rajkumar. Prior to this, he had appeared in two films, Sagar and Jalagara, both of which were not released theatrically.

Johnny appeared in more than 300 films as an actor and stuntman, predominantly in Kannada . He has also appeared in Malayalam, Telugu and Tamil films.

== Selected filmography ==
- Nanobba Kalla (1979)
- Nee Nanna Gellalare (1981)...David's henchman
- Prema Matsara (1982) as Psychiatric Ward Warden
- Silk Silk Silk (1983; Tamil)...Robert
- Tiger (1986)
- Digvijaya (1987)...Panja
- Bedi (1987)
- Bharath (1988)
- Nee Nanna Daiva (1988)...Johnny
- Inspector Vikram (1989)
- Parashuram (1989)
- Prathap (1990)
- Kaliyuga Bheema (1991)
- Gagana (1989)...Jum Jum Agarbatti Boda
- Sundara Kanda (1991)
- Bombay Dada (1991)...Philips
- Bombat Hendthi (1992)
- Halli Meshtru (1992)
- Thooguve Krishnana (1994)
- Bombat Raja Bandal Rani (1995)
- Mr. Vasu (1995) as Shivalinga
- Swasthik (1999)
- Shaapa (2001)

== See also ==
- List of people from Karnataka
- Cinema of Karnataka
- List of Indian film actors
- Cinema of India
