= Hongkongnalli Agent Amar =

- Directed by: Joe Simon
- Written by: Joe Simon
- Screenplay by: Joe Simon
- Produced by: Santhosh Shindhe; G. Madangopal; S. Chakrapani; Peter J. Kamilose
- Starring: Ambareesh; Ambika
- Cinematography: S. Ramachandra; Vasanth Kumar
- Edited by: P. Venkateshwara Rao
- Music by: Peter J. Kamilose
- Production company: G. P. S. International
- Release date: 11 January 1989
- Country: India
- Language: Kannada

Hongkongnalli Agent Amar ( transl. Agent Amar in Hong Kong) is a 1989 Indian Kannada film, written and directed by Joe Simon and produced by Santhosh Shindhe, G. Madangopal, S. Chakrapani and Peter J. Kamilose. The film stars Ambareesh and Ambika. The film has musical score by Peter J. Kamilose. This is Ambareesh's 100th movie.

== Cast ==
- Ambareesh as Agent Amar
- Sumalatha as Divya
- Anuradha as Priya
- Ambika as Aasha, Amar's love interest
- K. S. Ashwath
- Vajramuni
- Mukhyamantri Chandru
- Thoogudeepa Srinivas
- Sudheer
- Doddanna
- Rajanand
- Umashree
- Bob Christo
- Rockline Venkatesh
- Jai Jagadish in a special appearance
- Vijayalakshmi Singh in a special appearance

== Soundtrack ==
The songs are composed by Peter J. Kamilose. All songs became popular with "Chinna Nelesiruve Ninna" and "Hello My Preyasi" considered evergreen songs.

No.	Title	Singer(s)	Length
1.	"Eni Cheluvina"	Vani Jairam
2.	"Chinna Nelasiruve"	SP Balu, K.S. Chitra
3.	"Naavu Bhartiya Jodi"	S. P. Balasubrahmanyam, Vani Jairam
4.	"Hallo My Preyasi"	S. P. Balasubrahmanyam, K.S Chitra
5.	"Ee Henna Roopa"	S. P. Balasubrahmanyam, K.S. Chitra
