= Shanthi Nivasa =

- Directed by: H. R. Bhargava
- Written by: Chi. Udaya Shankar
- Screenplay by: H. R. Bhargava
- Produced by: R. F. Manik Chand; A. S. Mohan
- Starring: Anant Nag; Bharathi; Vijayakashi; Ramesh Bhat
- Cinematography: D. V. Rajaram
- Edited by: K. Balu
- Music by: M. Ranga Rao
- Production company: Vijaya Cine Productions
- Distributed by: Vijaya Cine Productions
- Release date: 29 December 1987
- Running time: 131 min
- Country: India
- Language: Kannada

Shanthi Nivasa is a 1988 Indian Kannada-language film, directed by H. R. Bhargava and produced by R. F. Manik Chand and A. S. Mohan. The film stars Anant Nag, Bharathi, Vijayakashi and Ramesh Bhat. The film has musical score by M. Ranga Rao. The film is a remake of 1970 Tamil film Vietnam Veedu.

== Cast ==
- Anant Nag
- Bharathi
- Vijay Kashi
- Ramesh Bhat
- Sundar Krishna Urs
- Mysore Lokesh
- K. S. Ashwath
- Rajanand
- Thimmayya
- Lohithaswa
- N. S. Rao
- Dinesh
- Phani Ramachandra
- M. S. Karanth
- Bemel Somanna
- Janardhan
- Chikkanna
- Dinakar
- Abhijith
- Srishaila
- Anand More
- Siddalingappa
- C. Neelakanta
- Umashree
- Kadambari
- Sudha Narasimharaju
- Shanthamma
- Anu
- Shilpa

== Soundtrack ==
The music was composed by M. Ranga Rao.

No.	Song	Singers	Lyrics	Length (m:ss)
1	"Jubilee Silver Jubilee"	S. P. Balasubrahmanyam, Vani Jairam	R. N. Jayagopal	04:28
2	"Mysoorininda Kai Hididu Banda"	S. P. Balasubrahmanyam, Vani Jairam	R. N. Jayagopal	04:26
3	"Ondu Hani Neeru"	S. P. Balasubrahmanyam	R. N. Jayagopal	04:26
4	"Masaala Paan Masaala"	S. P. Balasubrahmanyam, Vani Jairam	R. N. Jayagopal	04:32
