= Inspector Vikram (1989 film) =

1989 film directed by Dinesh Baboo

- Promotional poster
- Directed by: Dinesh Baboo
- Written by: Chi. Udayashankar (Dialogues)
- Screenplay by: Dinesh Baboo
- Story by: Dinesh Baboo
- Produced by: Raghavendra Rajkumar
- Starring: Shiva Rajkumar; K. S. Ashwath; Chi Guru Dutt; Aparna; Kavya; Sundar Krishna Urs
- Cinematography: Dinesh Baboo
- Edited by: P. Bhakthavatsalam
- Music by: Vijay Anand
- Production company: Nikhileshwari Cine Combines
- Distributed by: Vajreshwari Combines
- Release date: 25 May 1989
- Running time: 142 minutes
- Country: India
- Language: Kannada

Inspector Vikram is a 1989 Indian Kannada-language comedy thriller film directed and filmed by Dinesh Baboo, written by Chi. Udaya Shankar and produced by Raghavendra Rajkumar under the banner of Nikhileshwari Cine Combines.The film stars Shiva Rajkumar in the title role with Kavya, Chi Guru Dutt, Aparna and K. S. Ashwath in other supporting roles. It revolves around an undisciplined, but intelligent police inspector, Vikram. It is regarded as the first Kannada film of the comedy thriller genre and the first cop-comedy movie of Kannada cinema.

Inspector Vikram was the second film produced by Raghavendra Rajkumar under the production banner, Nikhileshwari Cine Combines after Shruthi Seridaaga. It was distributed by Parvathamma Rajkumar's Vajreshwari Combines. The film marks the first collaboration between scriptwriter Chi. Udaya Shankar and Shiva Rajkumar, and also the first collaboration between Dinesh Baboo and Shiva Rajkumar. It was predominantly shot in Bangalore (now Bengaluru). The film features original songs composed by Vijay Anand. The editing of the film was done by P. Bhakthavatsalam.

Inspector Vikram was released on 25 May 1989. It was an average grosser at the box office at the time of release, but has over the years accumulated a cult following. The film has been praised for incorporating an element of recklessness and humor to the cop role, as by then cop roles where portrayed in a serious tone. A spiritual successor of the same name was released in 2021. The core plot was loosely based on the 1983 American movie Eddie Macon's Run. Shiva Rajkumar is set to reprise the character of Inspector Vikram in IV - Returns.

== Plot ==
Vikram aka Inspector Vikram is a happy-go-lucky cop, who has no problem getting himself into trouble with his superiors, especially the police commissioner Chandrashekhar. Although accepted as a brilliant mind with a sharp intellect to solve crimes, he is often chided for his immature, casanova-personality. Much of misadventures, though leading to the solving of the crime, puts Vikram and Chandrashekhar (who is also his father's best friend) at opposite ends of the table. During the course of time, Vikram courts many brickbats and transfers in his career. He serves in the traffic department as well as the Law and order department. However, when an inmate Raja escapes from prison, Vikram is called back in to track him down.

It is revealed that Vikram had jailed Raja when he was caught killing his employer. In the meantime, to ensure that Vikram does his job, Chandrashekhar entrusts Krishnamurthy, a retired colonel in the INA to discipline Vikram. Despite the colonel's attempts to discipline Vikram, Vikram's attempts to fight that change is captured well in all its hilarity. Krishnamurthy's daughter Geetha and Vikram soon fall for each other. With Raja's escape on the large, and with no clues, Vikram decides to investigate Raja's lifestyle where he learns that Raja was actually an honest man, and it was his employer who set him up and got him arrested where he also meets his wife Vijaya and her ailing daughter.

Vikram meticulously retraces every step Raja has taken before his escape, and realizes that Raja had this so well planned that it would take years before anyone else got to him. Meanwhile, Geetha, who is a dance student goes on a dance tour across Karnataka. Vikram learns that Vijaya is also travelling with Geetha and Raja and Vijaya are meeting at a pre-discussed point and are planning to travel to Bombay from there. Vikram clandestinely follows Vijaya and soon ends up nabbing Raja. However, when Raja, seeing his opportunity to help his ailing daughter disappear, breaksdown in anguish where Vikram is now caught in a moral dilemma, agrees to let Raja escape, saying that his life won't change much even if he arrests him. Raja offers his gratitude and escapes, along with Vijaya and their daughter. Vikram joins Geetha and they drive away into the sunset.

== Cast ==
- Shiva Rajkumar as Inspector Vikram
- Chi Guru Dutt as Raja
- K. S. Ashwath as Police Commissioner Chandrashekar
- Kavya as Geetha
- Aparna as Vijaya, Raja's wife
- Sundar Krishna Urs as Retired Colonel Krishnamurthy, Geetha's father
- Avinash as Rao
- Bangalore Nagesh
- Honnavalli Krishna
- Sundar as Police Inspector
- Negro Johnny
- Mysore Lokesh as Jail Superintendent Kaliprasad

== Production ==
Shiva Rajkumar acted as a dupe for the villain (Tamil actor Narayan) in a car chase sequence towards the climax.

== Soundtrack ==
The soundtrack for the film was composed by Vijay Anand. Dilip, credited now as A. R. Rehman worked as an orchestra arranger.

Track list

Inspector Vikram

Soundtrack album by Vijay Anand
- Genre: Feature film soundtrack
- Label: Aditya Music
External audio
- Official Audio Jukebox on YouTube

No.	Title	Lyrics	Singer(s)	Length
1.	"Jokey Balu Jokey"	Bangi Ranga	S. P. Balasubrahmanyam
2.	"Ba Ennalu Haththira"	Chi. Udaya Shankar	S. P. Balasubrahmanyam, Manjula
3.	"Thuntukannali Yeno Kalpane"	Bangi Ranga	S. P. Balasubrahmanyam, Manjula
4.	"Ee Kanna Nota"	Chi. Udaya Shankar	S. P. Balasubrahmanyam
5.	"Kannadavene Kunidaduvudu"	Chi. Udaya Shankar	S. P. Balasubrahmanyam

== Reception ==
The movie received mixed reviews upon release. However, over the time the film has gained a strong impression from critics and audience alike. Dinesh Baboo's efforts to induce an element of recklessness and humour without build-ups in the cop role was well received since till then the lead cop roles were always portrayed in a serious tone with strictness and heroism. The freshness towards such an approach without demeaning the cops was well appreciated.
