= Ondagi Balu =

- Directed by: K. S. R. Das
- Written by: B. L. Venu
- Screenplay by: K. S. R. Das
- Produced by: Vijaya Shankar Bhat
- Starring: Vishnuvardhan; Manjula Sharma; Avinash; Aruna
- Cinematography: Kabir Lal
- Edited by: P. Venkateshwara Rao
- Music by: Vijay Anand
- Production companies: Devi and Devi Films
- Distributed by: Devi and Devi Films
- Release date: 25 January 1989
- Running time: 138 minutes
- Country: India
- Language: Kannada

Ondagi Balu is a 1989 Indian Kannada-language film, directed by K. S. R. Das and produced by Vijaya Shankar Bhat. The film stars Vishnuvardhan, Manjula Sharma, Avinash and Aruna. The film has musical score by Vijayanand. It is a remake of Hindi film Do Raaste.

== Cast ==
- Vishnuvardhan
- Rajesh
- Manjula Sharma
- Sumithra
- Avinash
- Aruna
- Pandari Bai
- Aparna
- Mukhyamantri Chandru
- Umashree
- M. V. Vasudeva Rao
- Mysore Lokesh

== Soundtrack ==
Soundtrack was composed by Vijay Anand. The song "Balegalu Aaduthire" was based on "Bindiya Khankegi" from Do Raaste.

- Balegalu - Chitralekha Sen
- Premanjali Ide - S. P. Balasubrahmanyam
- Ee Jeevana - S. P. Balasubrahmanyam
- Minuguva Thare - S. P. Balasubrahmanyam, Chitralekha Sen
- Cheluvinali Saati - S. P. Balasubrahmanyam
