= Daada =

- Video cover
- Directed by: P. Vasu
- Written by: P. Vasu
- Screenplay by: P. Vasu
- Produced by: R. K. Manik Chand
- Starring: Vishnuvardhan; Geetha; Suparna; Sangeetha
- Cinematography: Kulashekar
- Edited by: K. Balu
- Music by: Vijay Anand
- Production company: Shakthi Productions
- Release date: 7 November 1988
- Country: India
- Language: Kannada

Daada is a 1988 Indian Kannada-language film, directed by P. Vasu and produced by R. K. Manik Chand. The film stars Vishnuvardhan, Geetha, Suparna and Sangeetha. The musical score was composed by Vijay Anand.

== Cast ==
- Vishnuvardhan as Ganga alias Daada and Gururaj
- Geetha as Lakshmi
- Suparna Anand as Press Officer Aasha
- Sangeetha as Seetha
- K. S. Ashwath as Senior Daada
- Lohithashwa as Rajappa, Daada's father
- Pandari Bai as Kamalamma, Daada's mother
- Ramesh Bhat as Krishna
- Devaraj as Micheal
- Avinash as Gopi
- Sudarshan as Kailash
- Mysore Lokesh as Raja
- Balakrishna
- Sundar Krishna Urs as DSP Prakash
- Doddanna
- Shanimahadevappa as Kaalinga
- Lakshman Seetha's husband

== Soundtrack ==
The music was composed by Vijay Anand.

No.	Song	Singers	Lyrics	Length (m:ss)
1	"Ee Yauvvana"	S. P. Balasubrahmanyam, Vani Jairam	Chi. Udaya Shankar	
2	"Daada Daada Ee Droha"	S. P. Balasubrahmanyam	Shyamasundara Kulkarni	
3	"Hasivayasina"	S. P. Balasubrahmanyam, Vani Jairam	R. N. Jayagopal	
4	"Dhairyavu Iralu"	S. P. Balasubrahmanyam	Chi. Udaya Shankar	
5	"Nanna Cheluvane Rasikane"	S. P. Balasubrahmanyam, Vani Jairam	R. N. Jayagopal	
