= Sundar Raj =

Indian actor

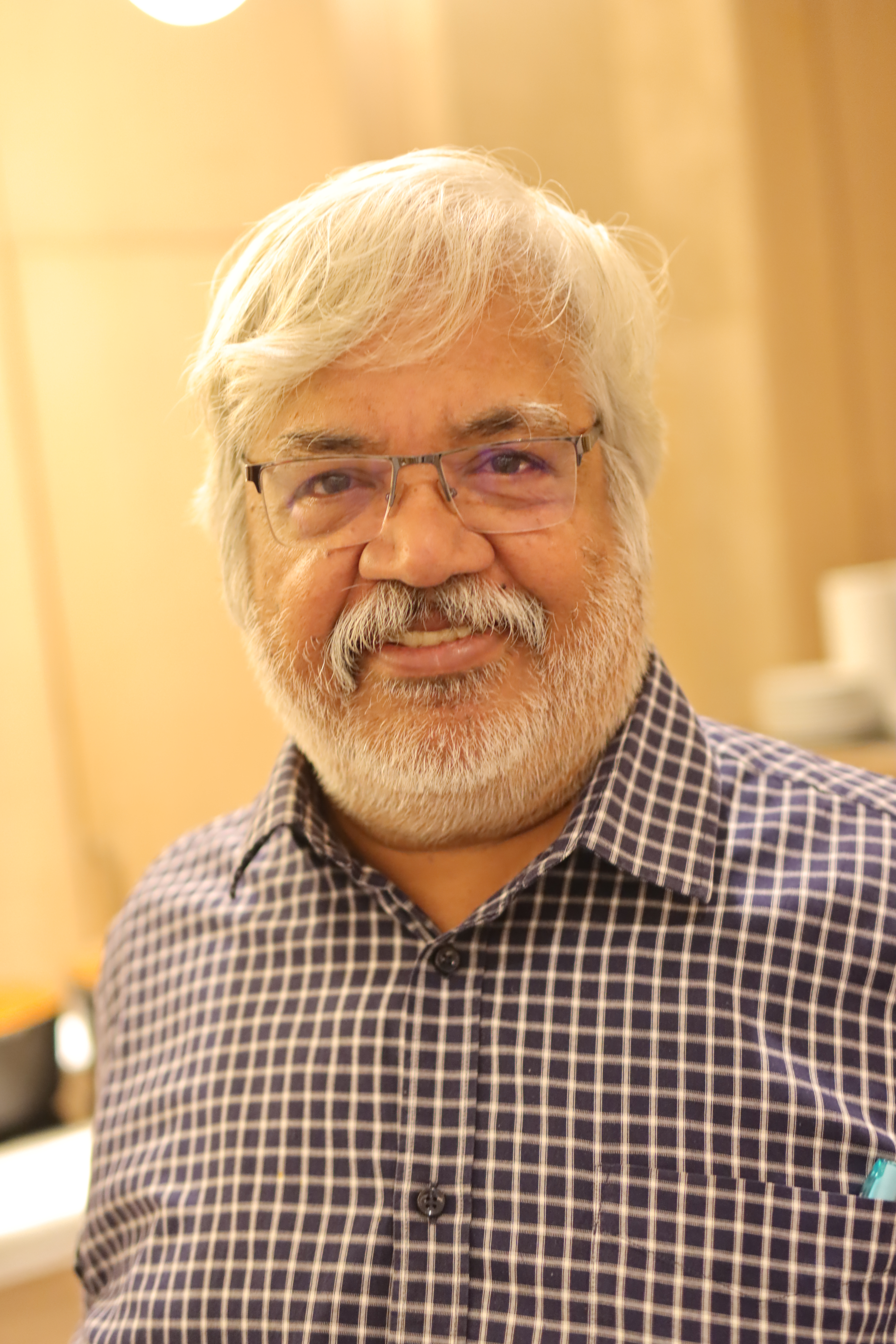
- Sundar Raj in 2022
- Born: Srirangam, Tamil Nadu, India
- Occupation: Actor
- Years active: 1967–present
- Spouse: Pramila Joshai
- Children: Meghana Raj

Sundar Raj is an Indian actor who works predominantly in the Kannada film industry, apart from a few Tamil films. Some of his notable films include Tabbaliyu Neenade Magane, Ondanondu Kaladalli, Chandanada Gombe, Kurigalu Saar Kurigalu (2001), Mathadana (2001), and Aakasmika (1993).

== Early life ==
Originally from Srirangam, Tamil Nadu, Sundar Raj moved with his family to Bangalore when he was three years old.

== Career ==
Raj had his first acting role in 1967 in Immadi Pulikeshi, going on to act in many films, mainly in Kannada.

He has also served as the Secretary of the Kannada Film Artist Association.

== Personal life ==
Sundar Raj is married to actress Pramila Joshai. Their daughter Meghana Raj is also an actress, who has worked mostly in Malayalam films.

== Selected filmography ==
=== Kannada ===
- Kaadu (1973)...Kencha
- Chomana Dudi (1975)...Gurava
- Tabbaliyu Neenade Magane (1977)...Yengta
- Thappu Thalangal (1978)...Soma
- Ondanondu Kaladalli (1979)
- Chandanada Gombe (1979)...Raghavendra
- Bangarada Jinke (1980)...Peter
- Nanna Devaru (1982)
- Benkiyalli Aralida Hoovu (1983)...Chandrashekhar
- Premave Balina Belaku (1983)...Sundar
- Banker Margayya (1983)...Balu
- Onde Raktha (1984)
- Kalinga Sarpa (1984)...Rajesh
- Savira Sullu (1985)
- Trishula (1985)...Inspector Purushotham
- Samsarada Guttu (1986)
- Ondu Muttina Kathe (1987)...Dhooma
- Bhadrakali (1987)
- Digvijaya (1987)...Vijay
- Kindari Jogi (1989)...Deva
- Gagana (1989)
- Udbhava (1990)...Nanjunda
- Mana Gedda Maga (1992)
- Bhagavan Sri Saibaba (1993)...Dasaganu
- Vijaya Kranthi (1993)
- Nyayakkagi Saval (1994)
- Kotreshi Kanasu (1994)
- Diggajaru (2001)...Lekkachara
- Kurigalu Saar Kurigalu (2001)...Sundar
- Pakka Chukka (2003)...Sundru
- Samarasimha Nayka (2005)
- Savira Mettilu (2006)
- Ravana (2009)
- Krishna Nee Late Aagi Baaro (2010)...Mukunda Iyengar
- Aatagara (2015)
- Rocket (2015)...Dr. Sundar
- Style King (2016)...Sundar
- Lift Man (2017)... Manjappa
- College Kumar (2017)
- Lucky Man (2022)...Arjun's father
- Selfie Mummy Googl Daddy (2022)
- Case of Kondana (2024)
- Laughing Buddha (2024)
- Amruthamathi (2025).....Yashouga

=== Tamil ===
Year	Title	Role	Notes
1978	Thappu Thalangal	Soma	credited as Sundar
1979	Uthiripookkal	Prakash	credited as Sundar
1980	Kaali	Rajaram's son	
1980	Gramathu Athiyayam		credited as Sundar
1981	Karaiyellam Shenbagapoo	Marathamuthu	credited as Sundar
1987	Vanna Kanavugal		credited as Sundar
2003	Jay Jay	Politician	
2023	Maruthi Nagar Police Station		

=== Telugu ===
- Kaali (1980)

== See also ==
- List of people from Karnataka
- Cinema of Karnataka
- List of Indian film actors
- Cinema of India
