= L. Vaidyanathan =

Indian composer (1942–2007)

Kalaimamani L. Vaidyanathan
- Born: Lakshminarayana Vaidyanathan; 9 April 1942; Madras, Madras Province, British India (now Chennai, Tamil Nadu, India)
- Died: 19 May 2007 (aged 65); Chennai, Tamil Nadu, India
- Occupations: Violinist, composer
- Children: 2
- Parent(s): V. Lakshminarayana; Seethalakshmi
- Musical career
- Instruments: Violin, harmonium

Lakshminarayana Vaidyanathan (Tamil: லக்ஷ்மிநாராயண வைத்தியநாதன்; 9 April 1942 – 19 May 2007) was an acclaimed musicologist, music director and composer, trained in the classical Carnatic music tradition. Vaidyanathan was born in Chennai to V. Lakshminarayana, and Seethalakshmi, both accomplished musicians. He was the elder brother of accomplished violinist duo L. Shankar and L. Subramaniam. He created the tunes of the iconic TV serial Malgudi Days. All three brothers received their musical training from their father.

== Career ==
Vaidyanathan started his career as an Assistant music director to G. K. Venkatesh and composed the score for over 170 films in languages including Tamil and Kannada. His notable works include Pesum Padam, Ezhavathu Manithan, Dasaratham and Marupakkam in Tamil and Aparichita, Kubi Matthu Iyala, Ondu Mutthina Kathe in Kannada. He was one of the best music arrangers in the country and was known for his use of rare and unknown instruments, subtly mixing sounds from the mandolin, flute and violin with various folk percussion instruments before the advent of present-day technological advances in sound mixing. He collaborated with C. Ashwath and composed music for many Kannada movies in the name Ashwath-Vaidi. One catchy and enduring composition of his would be, the Opening and Closing Score 'Thaana na nana' of Shankar Nag's Malgudi Days (TV series).

In 2003, the government of Tamil Nadu awarded Vaidyanathan with the Kalaimamani for his contributions to cinema.

== Filmography ==
With C. Aswath

Year	Film title	Notes
1979	Ene Barali Preethi Irali	Credited as "Ashwath - Vaidi"
1980	Anurakthe	Credited as "Ashwath - Vaidi"
1980	Narada Vijaya	Credited as "Ashwath - Vaidi"
1981	Aalemane	Credited as "Ashwath - Vaidi"
1981	Anupama	Credited as "Ashwath - Vaidi"
1981	Kanchana Mruga	Credited as "Ashwath - Vaidi"
1982	Baadada Hoo	Credited as "Ashwath - Vaidi"
1983	Simhasana	Credited as "Ashwath - Vaidi"

As solo composer

- Aparichita (1978)
- Vazhthungal (1978)
- Ezhavathu Manithan (1982)
- Lottery Ticket (1982)
- Anubhava (1984)
- Ondu Muttina Kathe (1987)
- Pushpaka Vimana (1987)
- Sandhya Raagam (1989)
- Love Maadi Nodu (1989)
- En Kadhal Kanmani (1990)
- Marupakkam (1991)
- Venal Kinavukal (1991)
- Kubi Matthu Iyala (1992)
- Dasarathan (1993)
- Mussanje (2001)
- Hrudayanjali (2002)
- Oruththi (2003)
- Pravaha (2004)
- Moggina Jade (2008)

Albums

- Ananda Dhandavam (1986) - Tamil
- Kaam Kala Tandav (1986) - Hindi
