= Ilavarasi =

Indian actress

- Born: 5 January 1967 (age 59)
- Other names: Kalpana (Telugu); Manjula Sharma (Kannada)
- Occupation: Film actress
- Years active: 1982–1992 (Lead actress); 1993–2005 (Supporting actress)
- Spouse: Gopal
- Children: 1

Ilavarasi is an Indian actress. She has appeared in Tamil, Telugu, Malayalam, and Kannada cinema. She was one of the prominent lead actresses from 1982 to 1992. Her popular lead roles are Vatsalyam along with Mammootty and Visu' s Samsaram Adhu Minsaram. She is credited as Ilavarasi in Tamil, Kalpana in Telugu and Manjula Sharma in Kannada. She is best known for her supporting roles in late 1990s.

== Partial filmography ==
Year	Film	Role	Language	Notes
1982	Vazhvey Maayam	Savithri Saminathan Sasthri	Tamil	
1983	Mutthaide Bhagya		Kannada	
1983	Kokkarakko		Tamil	
1983	Manaivi Solle Manthiram	Rani	Tamil	
1983	Sattam		Tamil	
1983	Alai Payum Nenjangal		Tamil	
1984	Oorkku Upadesam		Tamil	
1984	Sathiyam Neeye		Tamil	
1984	Veetuku Oru Kannagi		Tamil	
1984	24 Mani Neram	Rekha	Tamil	
1984	Kadamai		Tamil	
1984	Alaya Deepam		Tamil	
1984	Sirai	Politician's daughter	Tamil	
1984	Kuva Kuva Vaathugal		Tamil	
1984	Dhavani Kanavugal		Tamil	
1984	Naan Paadum Paadal	Sivagami	Tamil	
1984	Vengaiyin Mainthan		Tamil	
1984	Oru Kochu Swapnam	Sindhu	Malayalam	
1984	Hosa Ithihasa		Kannada	
1985	Aval Sumangalithan	Uma	Tamil	
1985	Mannukketha Ponnu		Tamil	
1985	Anthasthu	Radha	Tamil	
1985	Chain Jayapal		Tamil	
1985	Avan	Priya	Tamil	
1985	Chidambara Rahasiyam	Uma	Tamil	
1985	Kunguma Chimil	Philomena	Tamil	
1985	Samaya Purathale Satchi		Tamil	
1985	Vesham		Tamil	
1985	Naam		Tamil	
1985	Mappillai Singam		Tamil	
1985	Alaya Deepam	Radha	Telugu	
1985	Karaiyai Thodadha Alaigal		Tamil	
1986	Samsaram Adhu Minsaram	Sarojini	Tamil	
1986	Oomai Vizhigal	Uma	Tamil	
1986	Thaaiku Oru Thaalaattu		Tamil	
1986	Thalayattu Bommaigal		Tamil	
1986	Bathil Solval Bhadrakali		Tamil	
1986	Mama Kodallu Saval		Telugu	
1986	Adutha Veedu	Selvi	Tamil	
1986	Kadaikan Paarvai		Tamil	
1986	Mahasakthi Mariamman		Tamil	
1986	Odangal		Tamil	
1986	Jeevanathi		Tamil	
1987	Aattakkadha		Malayalam	
1987	Olavina Udugore		Kannada	
1987	Thaliya Aane		Kannada	
1987	Samsaram Oka Chadarangam	Sarojini	Telugu	
1987	Naku Pellam Kavali	Seeta	Telugu	
1987	Rowdy Police		Telugu	
1987	Chinna Kuyil Paaduthu	Vasanthi	Tamil	
1987	Srimathi Oka Bahumathi	Divya	Telugu	
1987	Kaboye Alludu	Saroja	Telugu	
1987	Manmadha Leela Kamaraju Gola	Kalpana	Telugu	
1987	Chandamama Raave		Telugu	
1987	Alludu Kosam	Radha Kumari	Telugu	
1987	Enga Veetu Ramayanam		Tamil	
1987	Kalyana Kachery		Tamil	
1988	Penmani Aval Kanmani		Tamil	
1988	Vasanthi		Tamil	
1988	Nammoora Raja		Kannada	
1988	Oomai Kuyil		Tamil	
1988	Pelli Kodukulosthunnaru		Telugu	
1988	Nava Bharatham	Parvathamma	Telugu	
1988	Maa Telugu Talli		Telugu	
1988	Bandipotu	Rani	Telugu	
1988	Bava Marudula Saval		Telugu	
1988	Sagatu Manishi		Telugu	
1988	Chattamtho Chadarangam	Inspector Prema	Telugu	
1988	Sahasam Cheyara Dimbhaka	Kalpana	Telugu	
1988	Padmavyuha		Kannada	
1989	Ondagi Balu		Kannada	
1989	Mundhanai Sabhatham		Tamil	
1989	Prema		Telugu	
1989	Rasathi Kalyanam		Tamil	
1989	Namma Bhoomi		Kannada	
1989	Athaimadi Methaiadi	Radha	Tamil	
1989	Sumangali	Divya	Telugu	
1989	Joo Laka Taka	Mary Karuna	Telugu	
1989	Oorantha Golanta	Geetha	Telugu	
1990	Ethir Kaatru		Tamil	
1990	Poli Kitty		Kannada	
1990	Arubadhu Naal Arubadhu Nimidam		Tamil	
1990	Enga Ooru Attukkaran		Tamil	
1990	Ethir Kaatru		Tamil	
1990	Neti Charitra	Sumathi	Telugu	
1991	Thanga Thamaraigal		Tamil	
1992	Mangala Nayagan		Tamil	
1992	Samarasimha		Kannada	
1992	Balarama Krishnulu	Seeta	Telugu	
1993	Aalavattam	Usha	Malayalam	
1993	Vatsalyam	Shobha	Malayalam	
1993	Aranmanai Kili	Poongodi's mother	Tamil	Supporting role
1993	Jailer Jagannath		Kannada	
1993	O' Faby	Jeni	Malayalam	
1993	Sabash Babu		Tamil	
1994	Santhaanagopaalam	Sandhya	Malayalam	
1994	Mudhal Manaivi	Renu	Tamil	
1994	Maa Voori Maaraju	Rajamma	Telugu	
1995	Kaattile Thadi Thevarude Aana	Ammini	Malayalam	
1995	Aadaalla Majaka		Telugu	
1995	Real Hero		Telugu	
1995	Aunty		Telugu	
1995	Big Boss		Telugu	
1995	Thedi Vandha Raasa		Tamil	
1996	Hitler	Seetha	Malayalam	
1996	Pudhu Nilavu		Tamil	
1996	Panchalankurichi		Tamil	
1996	Rhythu Rajyam		Telugu	
1997	Asuravamsam	Serin	Malayalam	
1997	Priyamaina Srivaru		Telugu	
1998	Sivappu Nila		Tamil	
1999	Hello		Tamil	
1999	Seetharama Raju	Lakshmi	Telugu	
2000	Good Luck	Sangeetha	Tamil	
2000	Devullu	Goddess Alamelu	Telugu	
2001	Rashtrageethe		Kannada	
2001	Apparaoki Oka Nela Thappindi	Sumitra	Telugu	
2001	Kottai Mariamman		Tamil	
2001	Seerivarum Kaalai	Doctor	Tamil	
2002	Indra	Indra's Elder Sister	Telugu	
2003	Dil	Nandhini's mother	Telugu	
2005	Chakram		Telugu	
2008	Parugu	Meena's Mother	Telugu	
2010	Dasanna		Telugu	
2010	Buridi		Telugu	

=== TV ===
- Silandhi Valai - Tamil serial
- Antharangaalu - Telugu serial
- Saradha - Malayalam serial

== Awards ==
Nandi Film Awards

- Nandi Award for Best Supporting Actress for Sagatu Manishi (1988)
