= Lohithaswa =

Indian film actor and playwright (1942–2022)

Lohithaswa T.S
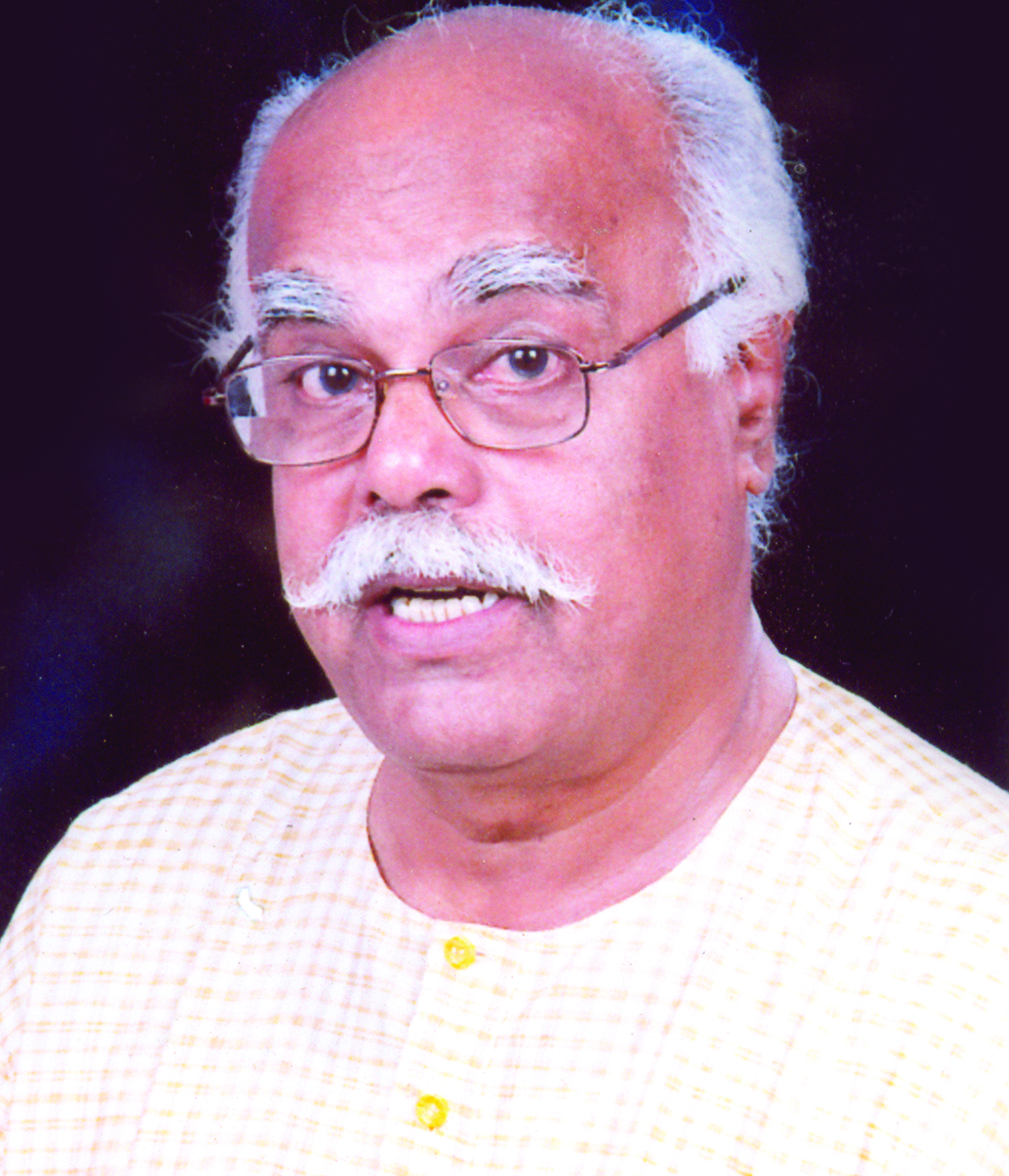
- Born: 5 August 1942; Thondagere, Tumkur, Kingdom of Mysore, British Raj
- Died: 8 November 2022 (aged 80); Bangalore, Karnataka, India
- Occupations: Actor; writer
- Children: Sharath Lohithaswa

Lohithashwa T. S. (5 August 1942 – 8 November 2022) was an Indian Kannada film actor and playwright and an English professor. He acted in more than five hundred Kannada movies, stage plays, and television serials. He was popularly known for his dominating voice in the Kannada film industry. His son is actor Sharath Lohitashwa.

== Life and career ==
Before entering the Kannada film industry, actor T.S. Lohithashwa did many roles in stage plays and television series. He married his wife Vatsala in 1971, and they had three children, two sons named Sharath Lohithashwa (first child) and Rahual (third child), and a daughter named Vinaya (second child).

While hospitalized for an infection, he suffered a heart attack. He died on 8 November 2022, at the age of 80.

== Partial filmography ==
- Ondu Oorina Kathe (1978)
- Muniyana Madari (1981)
- Simhasana (1983)
- Chanakya (1984)
- Gajendra (1984)
- Indina Ramayana (1984)
- Mooru Janma (1984)
- Olavu Moodidaga (1984)
- Preeti Vathsalya (1984)
- Samayada Gombe (1984)
- Hosa Neeru (1985)
- Kadina Raja (1985)
- Nee Bareda Kadambari (1985)
- Bete (1986)
- December 31 (1986)
- Marjala (1986)
- Aapadbandhava (1987)
- Athiratha Maharatha (1987)
- Banda Mukta (1987)
- Bedi (1987)
- Deva (1987)
- Jayasimha (1987)
- Mr. Raja (1987)
- Sangrama (1987)
- Avatara Purusha (1988)
- Chaduranga (1988)
- Daada (1988)
- Hello Daddy (1988)
- Navabharatha (1988)
- New Delhi (1988)
- Olavina Aasare (1988)
- Sahasa Veera (1988)
- Sambhavami Yuge Yuge (1988)
- Sangliyana (1988)
- Indrajith (1989)
- Abhimanyu (1990)
- Chakravarthy (1990)
- Ekalavya (1990)
- Pratap (1990)
- S. P. Sangliyana Part 2 (1990)
- C. B. I. Shiva (1991)
- Kadana (1991)
- Ranachandi (1991)
- Readymade Ganda (1991)
- Shivaraj (1991)
- Sundarakanda (1991)
- Mysore Jaana (1992)
- Police Lockup (1992)
- Midida Hrudayagalu (1993)
- Chinna (1994)
- Lockup Death (1994)
- Time Bomb (1994)
- Anuraga Sangama (1995)
- Emergency (1995)
- Kona Edaithe (1995)
- Savyasachi (1995)
- Tumbida Mane (1995)
- Geetha (1996)
- Huliya (1996)
- Ellaranthalla Nanna Ganda (1997)
- Kalavida (1997)
- Shanthi Nivasa (1997)
- Simhada Guri (1998)
- A. K. 47 (1999)
- Snehaloka (1999)
- Vishwa (1999)
- Chandu (2002)
- Saarathi (2011)
- Drama (2012)
- Kaveri Nagara (2013)
- Onthara Bannagalu (2018)

== Television serials ==
- Antim Raja, directed by M.S. Sathyu
- Gruhabhanga, directed by Girish Kasaravalli
- Malgudi days, directed by Shankar Nag
- Natyarani Shantala, directed by G.V. Iyer
- Om Namo, directed by K.M. Chaitanya
- Prathidhwani, directed by M.S. Sathyu
- "MAANASA VEENA" produced by Chetan Chaman for Zee Kannada 2006-2007 mega serial of the Zee launch

== Literary works ==
- Akkadi Saalu - prose collection, released on 21 September 2009
- Hottu Hoguva Munna - poetry collection, released on 21 September 2009
- Madusikkadalla
- A Million Mansions
- Mukhyamantri
- Sallapa
- Santheyalli Nintha Kabeera and Dr Thippeshi - play, released on 21 September 2009
- Siddagangeya Siddapurusha

Stage plays

A still from the play Huliya Neralu

- 27 Mavalli Circle, directed by T.N. Narasimhan
- Belchi
- Bharatha Darshana
- Chasnala Tragedy
- Dhangey Munchina Dinagalu, directed by Prasanna
- Huliya Neralu, directed by Prasanna
- Huttava Badidarey, directed by Prasanna
- Katthaley Daari Doora, directed by T.N. Narasimhan
- Kubi Mathhu Iyala, directed by Prasanna
- Meravanigey, directed by Gangandharswamy
- Mote Raman Sathyagraha, M.S. Sathyu
- Panchama, directed by C.G. Krishanswamy

== Awards ==
- Karnataka State Nataka Academy Award, 1997
- Suvarna Karnataka Rajyotsava Award, 2006
