= Vijay Kashi =

Indian film actor

- Occupation: Film actor
- Spouse: Vyjayanthi Kashi
- Children: Prateeksha Kashi

Vijay Kashi is an Indian actor in the Kannada film industry. Some of his notable films are Undu Hoda Kondu Hoda (1992), Mangalyam Tantunanena (1998), Suryavamsha (1999).

== Personal life ==
Vijay Kashi is married to Vyjayanthi Kashi. They have a daughter named Prateeksha Kashi. Both Vyjayanthi Kashi and Prateeksha Kashi are Indian classical dancers, a Kuchipudi exponents.

== Career ==
Vijay Kashi has been part of more than 65 movies in Kannada. Born in Sagara, Karnataka.

== Selected filmography ==
- Akramana (1979)
- Baadada Hoo (1982)...Dr. Mohan
- Indina Bharatha (1984)...Bhaskar
- Bhagyada Lakshmi Baramma (1986)
- Suprabhatha (1988)
- Shanthi Nivasa (1988)
- Krishna Rukmini (1988)
- Sri Satyanarayana Pooja Phala (1990)
- Shabarimale Swamy Ayyappa (1990)
- Undu Hoda Kondu Hoda (1992)...Balu
- Bombat Hendthi (1992)
- Mangalyam Tantunanena (1998)
- Surya Vamsha (1999)

== See also ==
- List of people from Karnataka
- Cinema of Karnataka
