= Ramakrishna (Kannada actor) =

Indian actor

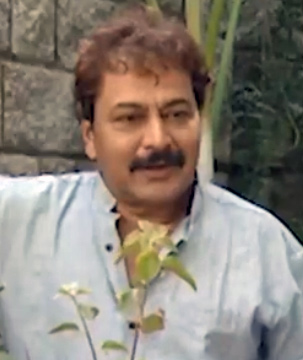
- Born: c. 1954 (age 71–72); Neernalli, Sirsi, North Canara, Mysore State (Now Karnataka), India
- Other name: Neernalli Ramakrishna
- Occupation: Actor

Ramakrishna (born c. 1954), also known as Neernalli Ramakrishna, is an Indian actor who works predominantly in Kannada cinema.

== Career ==
His debut being Babruvahana as Lord Krishna alongside the lead double role played by Dr. Rajkumar as Arjuna and Babruvahana, and known for his portrayal of character roles as a lead actor. He was born into the Havyaka Brahmin community in Neernalli, near Sirsi, in the erstwhile North Canara (now Uttara Kannada) region of Karnataka State. In his career spanning over 50 years, he has appeared in over 200 films, mostly Kannada and a handful in Tamil cinema; he appeared in a lead role in K. Balachander's Poikkal Kudhirai (1983). A protégé of the renowned filmmaker Puttanna Kanagal, he featured in some of the latter's best works such as Ranganayaki (1981), Maanasa Sarovara and Amrutha Ghalige (1984). Since the 1990s, he has appeared mostly in supporting roles.

At the 2004 general elections, he contested from the erstwhile Kanara Lok Sabha constituency and lost, representing the Janata Party (JP). He had revealed that he had played the role of Lakshmana alongside Rajkumar who played the role of Lord Rama in Singeetam Srinivasa Rao's Lava Kusha which also happened to be Telugu actor Krishna's maiden Kannada venture but was stalled after a week's shooting in Hyderabad.

== Partial filmography ==
=== Kannada ===
- Babruvahana (1977)...Krishna
- Bhagyavantharu (1977)
- Tabbaliyu Neenade Magane (1977)
- Paduvaaralli Pandavaru (1978)
- Parasangada Gendethimma (1978)
- Madhu Chandra (1979)...Racha
- Prema Anuraga (1980)
- Nanna Rosha Nooru Varusha (1980)
- Rama Parushurama (1980)
- Ranganayaki (1981)
- Chellida Raktha (1982)
- Maanasa Sarovara (1982)
- Prema Matsara (1982)...Ravi
- Onde Guri (1982)
- Benkiyalli Aralida Hoovu (1984)
- Nagabekamma Nagabeku (1984)
- Shivakanye (1984)
- Devathe (1986)
- Amrutha Ghalige (1984)
- Olavu Moodidaga (1984)
- Baddi Bangaramma (1984)
- Runamukthalu (1984)
- Bekkina Kannu (1984)
- Mugila Mallige (1985)
- Sneha Sambandha (1985)
- Aparoopada Kathe (1986)
- Ella Hengasarinda (1986)
- Hosa Neeru (1986)
- Nannavaru (1986)
- Tiger (1986)
- Usha (1986)
- Olavina Udugore (1987)
- Bandhamuktha (1987)
- Hrudaya Pallavi (1987)
- Mukhavada (1987)
- Sangrama (1987)
- Sri Chamundeshwari Pooja Mahime (1987)
- Yarigagi (1987)
- Dharmathma (1988)
- Gudugu Sidilu (1988)
- Kankana Bhagya (1988)
- Ladies Hostel (1988)
- Mathrudevobhava (1988)
- Mutthaide (1988)
- Sahasaveera (1988)
- Darodegala Naduve (1989)
- Muthinatha Manushya (1989)
- Yuga Purusha (1989)
- Bidisada Bandha (1989)...Ramu
- Panchama Veda (1990)...Ravi
- Aata Bombata (1990)
- Halliya Surasuraru (1990)
- Shabarimale Swamy Ayyappa (1990)
- Uthkarsha (1990)
- Antharangada Mrudanga (1991)
- Iduve Jeevana (1991)
- Kadana (1991)
- Prema Pareekshe (1991)...Gopi
- Sangya Balya (1992)
- Guru Brahma (1992)
- Prana Snehita (1992)
- Belli Modagalu (1992)
- Mallige Hoove (1992)
- Yarigu Helbedi (1994)
- Mister Mahesh Kumar (1994)
- Aghatha (1995)
- Hosa Baduku (1995)
- Mana Midiyithu (1995)
- Dhani (1996)
- Laali (1997)
- Amruthavarshini (1997)
- Preethsod Thappa (1998)
- Nishyabda (1998)
- Sneha (1999)
- Premotsava (1999)
- Sankata Bandaga Venkataramana (2000)
- Nan Hendthi Chennagidale (2000)
- Swalpa Adjust Madkolli (2000)
- Ninagagi (2000)
- Balagalittu Olage Baa (2002)
- Nanjundi (2003)
- Excuse Me (2003)
- Monalisa (2004)
- Aham Premasmi (2005)
- Rishi (2005)
- 7 O' Clock (2006)
- Aishwarya (2006)
- Savira Mettilu (2006)
- Ugadi (2007)
- Ee Sambhashane (2007)
- Preethigaagi (2007)
- Samagama (2010)
- Vimukti (2010)
- Jayahe (2010)
- Kool: Sakkath Hot Maga (2011)
- Edegarike (2012)...Rashmi's father
- Gombegala Love (2013)
- Jai Lalitha (2014)
- Bachchan (2013)
- Raja Rajendra (2015)...Neelakanta Raju
- Paradesi C/o London (2018)
- Omme Nishyabda Omme Yuddha (2019)
- Sankeerthana (2026)

=== Tamil ===
Year	Title	Role	Notes
1982	Pannai Purathu Pandavargal		
1983	Poikkal Kudhirai	Indu	
1983	Anney Anney	Malli	
2006	Kadhale En Kadhale	Rajiv's father	
2017	Nisabdham	Judge	

=== Dubbing artist ===
- Anil Kapoor - Pallavi Anu Pallavi
