= Sudheer (Kannada actor) =

Indian film actor (1947–1999)

- Born: 21 May 1947; Sagara, Mysore state, (Now Karnataka), India
- Died: 13 June 1999 (aged 52); Bangalore, Karnataka, India
- Occupations: Actor; politician
- Spouse: Malathi
- Children: Nanda Kishore; Tharun Sudhir

Sudheer (21 May 1947 – 13 June 1999) was an Indian actor and politician known for his work in Kannada cinema. His noted performances came in films such as Chalagara (1981), Preethi Vathsalya (1984), Lorry Driver (1987), Bandha Muktha (1987), Jana Nayaka (1988), Mathru Vathsalya (1988), Looti Gang (1994) and Lady Commissioner (1997).

== Biography ==
Sudheer appeared in more than 200 Kannada-language films. He was also a noted stage actor and performed in plays mostly in North Karnataka, such as Veera Sindhura Lakshmana and Gowdra Gadhla. Sudheer's film debut came in Beesida Bale (1973). As a film actor, he received praise for his portrayal of negative roles in the 1980s and 1990s. His collaboration with Ambareesh, who usually played the lead, became popular during this time.

Sudheer had a brief stint in politics when he joined the Karnataka Kranti Ranga floated by Sarekoppa Bangarappa. He contested unsuccessfully from Sagar at the 1989 Karnataka Legislative Assembly election. He subsequently switched to Bharatiya Janata Party and was made a member of the party's Karnataka unit working committee. Sudheer died on 13 June 1999 after suffering from breathing difficulties at a hospital in Bangalore. He left behind Malathi, also a stage artiste, and two sons Nanda Kishore and Tharun Sudhir, both of whom would go on to become Kannada-language film directors.

== Filmography ==
- Beesida Bale (1973)
- Maadi Madidavaru (1974)
- Maya Manushya (1976)
- Veera Sindhoora Lakshmana (1977)
- Tabbaliyu Neenade Magane (1977)
- Halli Haida (1978)
- Narada Vijaya (1980)
- Manku Thimma (1980)
- Prachanda Putanigalu (1981)...Shambhu
- Nee Nanna Gellalare (1981)...Suri
- Maha Prachandaru (1981)
- Keralida Simha (1981)
- Garjane (1981)
- Chalagara (1981)
- Havina Hede (1981)
- Garjane (1981)
- Avali Javali (1981)
- Chellida Raktha (1982)
- Nyaya Ellide (1982)...George
- Sahasa Simha (1982)...Inspector Gopal Rao
- Shankar Sundar (1982)
- Mava Sose Savaal (1982)
- Avala Neralu (1983)
- Chandi Chamundi (1983)...Raghu
- Chinnadantha Maga (1983)...Kalabhairava
- Dharma Yuddha (1983)
- Gandugali Rama (1983)
- Gedda Maga (1983)
- Karune Illada Kanoonu (1983)
- Kranthiyogi Basavanna (1983)
- Raktha Tilaka (1983)...Veerabhadra
- Premave Balina Belaku (1983)...child trafficker
- Aaradhane (1984)
- Bedaru Bombe (1984)
- Benki Birugali (1984)
- Makkaliralavva Mane Thumba (1984)
- Preethi Vathsalya (1984)...Manohar
- Shapatha (1984)...Kalinga
- Pavitra Prema (1984)...Rocky
- Ade Kannu (1985)
- Chaduranga (1985)...Yogappa
- Devarelliddane (1985)
- Haavu Yeni Aata (1985)...Giridhar
- Thayi Kanasu (1985)...Bhadra
- Africadalli Sheela (1986)
- Bete (1986)
- Brahmasthra (1986)
- Ee Jeeva Ninagagi (1986)...cameo
- Preethi (1986)...Joseph
- Agni Parikshe (1986)...Kalinga
- Tiger (1986)...'Cantonement' Kaala
- Anthima Ghatta (1987)
- Sathyam Shivam Sundaram (1987)...Vishwapathi
- Bandha Muktha (1987)
- Kizhakku Africavil Sheela (1987; Tamil)
- Bazar Bheema (1987)
- Bedi (1987)
- Lorry Driver (1987)...Janakiramaiah
- Huli Hebbuli (1987)..."Meese" Mariyappa
- Jeevana Jyothi (1987)...Radha's molester
- Dharmathma (1988)
- Ramanaa Shamanna (1988)
- Sangliyana (1988)...Kumbi
- Jana Nayaka (1988)...Veerabhadriah
- Mathru Vathsalya (1988)
- Adrushta Rekhe (1989)
- Avane Nanna Ganda (1989)...Shankar
- C.B.I. Shankar (1989)...Bullet Basya
- Hosa Kavya (1989)...Jaggi
- Vettri Vizhaa (1989; Tamil)...Samuthiran
- Antintha Gandu Naanalla (1989)...Sannanna
- Narasimha (1989)...Natwar Lal
- Aata Bombata (1990)
- Hongkongnalli Agent Amar (1989)
- Hosa Jeevana (1990)
- Dharma (1990; Telugu)
- S. P. Sangliyana Part 2 (1990)...Kumbi
- Ranabheri (1990)
- Prathap (1990)...Finance Minister Bendigeri
- Bombay Dada (1991)
- Kaliyuga Bheema (1991)...Pinto/Sikander
- Central Rowdy (1991)
- Police Matthu Dada (1991)...Apparao
- Inspector Dhanush (1991; Hindi)...Apparao
- Agni Panjara (1992)
- Chithralekha (1992)
- Bharjari Gandu (1992)
- Vikram (1993)
- Golibar (1993)...Gandoji Rao
- Looti Gang (1994)
- Gopi Kalyana (1994)
- Odahuttidavaru (1994)...Devayya
- Shiva Sainya (1996)...Sannappa Doddappanavar
- Agni IPS (1997)
- Lady Commissioner (1997)
- Simhada Mari (1997)...Venkatesha
- Veerappa Nayaka (1999)
- Astra (2000)
- Nannavalu Nannavalu (2000)

== See also ==
- List of people from Karnataka
- List of Indian film actors
