= List of Kannada films of 1995 =

== Top-grossing films ==
Rank	Title	Collection	Ref.
1.	Om	₹37 crore (₹267.86 crore in 2025)	
2.	Putnanja	₹8 crore (₹52.4 crore in 2025)	
3.	Operation Antha	₹5 crore (₹32.75 crore in 2025)	
4.	Aata Hudugaata	₹2 crore (₹13.1 crore in 2025)	
5.	Karulina Kudi	₹1 crore (₹6.55 crore in 2025)	

== List ==
The following is a list of films produced in the Kannada film industry in India in 1995, presented in alphabetical order.

Title	Director	Cast	Music
Aagatha	Suresh Heblikar	Suresh Heblikar, Shruti, Girish Karnad	Vijaya Bhaskar
Aata Hudugata	B. Ramamurthy	Raghavendra Rajkumar, Prema, Swathi, Bank Janardhan	Sadhu Kokila
Annaji	R. Devadiga	Kumar Govind, Latheesha, Lohithaswa	Chandrakanth
Anuraga Sangama	V. Umakanth	Kumar Govind, Sudharani, Ramesh Aravind, B. Saroja Devi	V. Manohar
Aragini	P. H. Vishwanath	Ramesh Aravind, Sudharani, Ramesh Bhat, Sanketh Kashi	S. P. Venkatesh
Baalondu Chaduranga	Bhagawan	Ramesh Aravind, Sai Kumar, S. P. Balasubrahmanyam, Sudharani, Lakshmi	Seenu
Bal Nan Maga	Balaji Singh	Jaggesh, Mohana, Doddanna, Umashree	Sadhu Kokila
Bangarada Kalasha	H. R. Bhargava	Vishnuvardhan, Sithara, Anjana	Rajan–Nagendra
Beladingala Baale	Sunil Kumar Desai	Ananth Nag, Suman Nagarkar, Ramesh Bhat, Vanitha Vasu	Guna Singh
Betegara	A. T. Raghu	Ambareesh, Sithara, Mukhyamantri Chandru	Sadhu Kokila
Bombat Raja Bandal Rani	Vasanth Kunigal	Vinod Raj, Priyanka, Umashree, Dheerendra Gopal	Raj Mohan
Chinnada Raja	Om Devar	Tiger Prabhakar, Srinath, Tara, Sagar Raja	Raj Mohan
Chiranjeevi Rajegowda	Joe Simon	Tiger Prabhakar, Vidyashree, Dolly, Doddanna	Hamsalekha
Deergha Sumangali	D. Rajendra Babu	Vishuvardhan, Sithara, Devan, Srinivasa Murthy	Hamsalekha
Dore	Shivamani	Shivarajkumar, Hema Panchamukhi, Bharathi	Hamsalekha
Eddide Gaddala	Sridarshan	Sridhar, Srinath, Ramakrishna, Madhushree	Balu Sharma
Emergency	Om Prakash Rao	Devaraj, Nirosha, Kalyan Kumar, B. Sarojadevi	Sadhu Kokila
Eshwar	R. C. Ranga	Jaggesh, Chandini, Tara, Jayanthi	Hamsalekha
Gadibidi Aliya	Om Sai Prakash	Shivarajkumar, Malashri, Mohini, Jayamala, Srinath	Koti
Ganeshana Galate	Phani Ramachandra	Shashikumar, Sithara, Ramakrishna	Rajan–Nagendra
Giddu Dada	Dwarakish	Ramkumar, Malashri, Dwarakish, M. P. Shankar	Rajan–Nagendra
Hello Sister	Om Sai Prakash	Malashri, Shashikumar, Dwarakish, Doddanna	Koti
Hendathi Endare Heegirabeku	Kashinath	Kashinath, Akshata, Sundar Raj, Girija Lokesh, Sathyabhama	V. Manohar
Himapatha	Rajendra Singh Babu	Vishnuvardhan, Suhasini Maniratnam, Jayapradha	Hamsalekha
Hosa Baduku	B. Parameshwar	Ramkumar, Bhavya, Ramakrishna	Vijaya Bhaskar
Kalyanotsava	Rajendra Singh Babu	Ambareesh, S. P. Balasubrahmanyam, Shruthi, Vinaya Prasad	Hamsalekha
Karulina Kudi	V. P. Sarathy	Ambareesh, Vishnuvardhan, Sithara, Shamili	Rajan–Nagendra
Kavya	Kodlu Ramakrishna	Ramkumar, Sudharani, Sithara, Kalyan Kumar	Sadhu Kokila
Kidnap	Dwarakish	Devaraj, Dwarakish, Nandini Singh, Avinash	Sax Raju
Killer Diary	Srinivasa Raju	Devaraj, Shruti, Tara	Vijay Anand
Kona Edaithe	B. Jayashree Devi	Vishnuvardhan, Kumar Govind, Vinaya Prasad, Sudharani, Vanitha Vasu	Hamsalekha
Kraurya	Girish Kasaravalli	Renukamma Murugodu, Master Vishwas, H. G. Dattatreya	L. Vaidyanathan
Lady Police	Naganna	Malashri, Harish, Rajanand	Rajesh Ramanath
Mana Midiyithu	M. S. Rajashekar	Shivarajkumar, Priya Raman, Tara, Srinath	Upendra Kumar
Mangalya Sakshi	Chikkanna	Abhijeeth, Shruti, Madhukar, Tennis Krishna	Sadhu Kokila
Mojugara Sogasugara	Vijay	Vishnuvardhan, Sonakshi, Shruti, Mukhyamantri Chandru, Lokesh, Pandari Bai, Jayanthi	Hamsalekha
Mother India	Shivamani	Devaraj, Nirosha, Thilakan, Srinivasa Murthy	Sadhu Kokila
Mr. Abhishek	N. T. Jayaram Reddy	Ambareesh, Sudharani, Tara, Abhijeeth	Hamsalekha
Mr. Vasu	Joe Simon	Tiger Prabhakar, Dolly, Silk Smitha	Hamsalekha
Mruthyu Bandhana	Guruprasad	Kumar Govind, Anil, Sangeetha, Mukhyamantri Chandru	Peter Kemilas
Mutthinantha Hendathi	Peraala	Saikumar, Malashri, Vinaya Prasad, Ramesh Bhat	Hamsalekha
Naviloora Naidile	P. Chandrashekar	Raghuveer, Sindhu, Tejaswini	Hamsalekha
Nighatha	S. Narayan	Shashikumar, Charanraj, Madhurima, S. Narayan	Sadhu Kokila
Nilukada Nakshatra	Kodlu Ramakrishna	Ananth Nag, Bhavya, Tara	Sangeeta Raja
Ohhooo	H. N. Shankar	S. Narayan, Srivani, B. Mallesh	Sadhu Kokila
Om	Upendra	Shivarajkumar, Prema, Srishanti, Sadhu Kokila, Harish Acharya, Kote Prabhakar	Hamsalekha
Operation Antha	Upendra	Ambareesh, Lankesh, Tara, K. S. Ashwath	V. Manohar
Police Power	Yogish Hunsur	Devaraj, Prema, Ramesh Bhat, Lohithaswa	Hamsalekha
Priya O Priya	Rajanand Reddy	Naveen Chander, Priyanka, Ramesh Bhat	Sadhu Kokila
Professor	Renuka Sharma	Ambareesh, Srishanti, Tara, Pandari Bai	Hamsalekha
Putmalli	Victory Vasu	Sai Kumar, Malashri, Kalyan Kumar, B. Saroja Devi	Seenu
Putnanja	V. Ravichandran	V. Ravichandran, Meena, Umashree, Lokesh	Hamsalekha
Ravitheja	H. Vasudev	Kumar Govind, Malavika Avinash, Tara, Doddanna	Sax Raja
Rowdy	Om Sai Prakash	Shashikumar, Mohini, Mukhyamantri Chandru, Umashree	Raj–Koti
Samara	Chi Guru Dutt	Shivarajkumar, Sudharani, Devaraj, Ajay Gundurao, Malavika Avinash	Kausthuba
Sangeetha Sagara Ganayogi Panchakshara Gavai	Chindodi Bangaresh	Girish Karnad, Lokesh, Kalyan Kumar, Vijay Raghavendra, Dheerendra Gopal	Hamsalekha
Savyasachi	M. S. Rajashekar	Shivarajkumar, Prema, Charithra, Avinash	Sadhu Kokila
Shiva	B. Ramamurthy	Shashikumar, Bindiya, Vinaya Prasad, Kalyan Kumar	Sadhu Kokila
Shravana Sanje	A. T. Raghu	Charan Raj, Ramkumar, Sithara, Surya, Avinash	Upendra Kumar
Shubha Lagna	B. Krishnamurthy	Shashikumar, Shruti, Tara, Nandini Singh	Rajesh Ramanath
Srigandha	P. H. Vishwanath	Ramesh Aravind, Sudharani, Sanketh Kashi, Srinath	Hamsalekha
State Rowdy	K. S. R. Das	Devaraj, Ramkumar, Dolly, Rami Reddy	Rajan–Nagendra
Thaliya Sowbhagya	Om Prakash Rao	Ramkumar, Shruthi, Sai Kumar, Dwarakish	Raj–Koti
Thavaru Beegaru	A. Subramanyam	Sai Kumar, Vinaya Prasad, Lathashree, M. S. Umesh	Sadhu Kokila
Thayi Illada Tavaru	S. Mahendar	Ramkumar, Shruthi, Srinivasa Murthy, Balakrishna	Hamsalekha
Thumbida Mane	S. Umesh	Vishnuvardhan, Shashikumar, Abhijeeth, Tara, Shruthi, Vinaya Prasad, Umashree	Upendra Kumar
Tungabhadra	H. N. Shankar	Raghuveer, Sindhu, Girija Lokesh	Hamsalekha
Yama Kinkara	Tiger Prabhakar	Vishnuvardhan, Tiger Prabhakar, Dolly, Sonakshi, Vajramuni	Rajan–Nagendra

== See also ==
- Kannada films of 1994
- Kannada films of 1996
