= List of Kannada films of 1994 =

== Top-grossing films ==
Rank	Title	Collection	Ref.
1.	Odahuttidavaru	₹5 crore (₹36.3 crore in 2025)	
2.	Mandyada Gandu	₹4.5 crore (₹32.67crore in 2025)	
3.	Rasika	₹4 crore (₹29.04 crore in 2025)	
4.	Gandugali	₹3 crore (₹21.78 crore in 2025)	
5.	Haalunda Thavaru	₹2 crore (₹14.52 crore in 2025)	

== List ==
The following is a list of films produced in the Kannada film industry in India in 1994, presented in alphabetical order.

Title	Title in Kannada	Director	Cast	Music
Adhipathi	ಅಧಿಪತಿ	Om Prakash Rao	Devaraj, Rockline Venkatesh, Prakash Rai, Girija, Avinash	Vijay Anand
Alexander	ಅಲೆಕ್ಸಾಂಡರ್	Srinivasa Reddy	Shashikumar, Sindhuja, Tara, Mukhyamantri Chandru	Vijay Anand
Anuraga Geethe	ಅನುರಾಗ ಗೀತೆ	G. V. Iyer	G. V. Raghavendra, Sridhar, Kalyan Kumar, Vajramuni, Kumari Panchami, Hema Chaudhary	Upendra Kumar
Apoorva Samsara	ಅಪೂರ್ವ ಸಂಸಾರ	B. Ramamurthy	Harshavardhan, Shruti, Tara, Vanitha Vasu, Doddanna	Upendra Kumar
Appa Nanjappa Maga Gunjappa	ಅಪ್ಪ ನಂಜಪ್ಪ ಮಗ ಗುಂಜಪ್ಪ	Shivaram Gangatgar	Tennis Krishna, Anjali Sudhakar, Abhinaya, M. S. Umesh, Vijanath Biradar	R. Damodar
Beda Krishna Ranginata	ಬೇಡ ಕೃಷ್ಣ ರಂಗಿನಾಟ	Rajkishore	Jaggesh, Sindhuja, Payal Malhotra, Srinath	V. Manohar
Bhairava	ಭೈರವ	Rajkishore	Jaggesh, Nandini Singh, Vajramuni, Doddanna	M. M. Keeravani
Bhootayi Makkalu	ಭೂತಾಯಿ ಮಕ್ಕಳು	Siddalingaiah	Shashikumar, Abhijeeth, Madhuri, Dhanuja, Aravind	Rajan–Nagendra
Bhuvaneshwari	ಭುವನೇಶ್ವರಿ	Rama Narayanan	Baby Shamili, Abhijeeth, Shruti, Tara	C Ganesh
Chamathkara	ಚಮತ್ಕಾರ	Suresh Heblikar	Suresh Heblikar, Chinmayi, Ramesh Bhat, Vanitha Vasu	Manoranjan Prabhakar
Chinna	ಚಿನ್ನ	V. Ravichandran	V. Ravichandran, Yamuna, Puneet Issar, Silk Smitha	Hamsalekha
Chinna Nee Naguthiru	ಚಿನ್ನನೀ ನಗುತಿರು	T. Chikkanna	Abhijeeth, Baby Shamili, Geetha, Tennis Krishna	Hamsalekha
Curfew	ಕರ್ಫ್ಯೂ	H. S. Rajashekar	Devaraj, Sudharani, B. C. Patil, Doddanna	Sadhu Kokila
Galige	ಗಳಿಗೆ	M. S. Sathyu	Shailaja, Amit Rai, Dandup Sengpo	Mysore Ananthaswamy
Gandhada Gudi Part 2	ಗಂಧದ ಗುಡಿ ಭಾಗ ೨	Vijay	Shivarajkumar, Rajkumar, Rajeshwari, Bharathi, Tara, Charan Raj, Tiger Prabhakar	Rajan–Nagendra
Gandugali	ಗಂಡುಗಲಿ	Balaji Singh Babu	Shivarajkumar, Nirosha, Pournami, Ravi Kiran	Sadhu Kokila
Gangavva Gangamayi	ಗಂಗವ್ವ ಗಂಗಾಮಯಿ	Vasanth Mokashi	Ananth Nag, Sulabha Deshpande, Jayamala, B. V. Radha	Vijaya Bhaskar
Gold Medal	ಗೋಲ್ಡ್ ಮೆಡಲ್	Om Sai Prakash	Devaraj, Ambareesh, Thriller Manju, Sudharani, Vanitha Vasu, Shilpasri	Vijay Anand
Gopi Kalyana	ಗೋಪಿ ಕಲ್ಯಾಣ	B. Ramamurthy	Tiger Prabhakar, Dombara Krishna Suresh, Anjana, Chaithra, Doddanna, Anjali Sudhakar	Hamsalekha
Halunda Tavaru	ಹಾಲುಂಡ ತವರು	D. Rajendra Babu	Vishnuvardhan, Sithara, Pandari Bai, Srinivasa Murthy, Pramila Joshai, Sanketh Kashi	Hamsalekha
Hantaka	ಹಂತಕ	K. V. Prasad	Ramesh Aravind, Panchami, Sathyajith, Sihi Kahi Chandru	V. Manohar
Hetta Karulu	ಹೆತ್ತ ಕರುಳು	Om Sai Prakash	Devaraj, Shruti, Tara, Sai Kumar, Rajesh	Upendra Kumar
Hongirana	ಹೊಂಗಿರಣ	K. P. Bhavani Shankar	Raghuveer, Keerthana, Bharath Raj, Vajramuni	Hamsalekha
Indian	ಇಂಡಿಯನ್	N. K. Keerthiraj	Devaraj, Sithara, K. S. Ashwath, Srinivasa Murthy	Madan Mallu
Indrana Gedda Narendra	ಇಂದ್ರನ ಗೆದ್ದ ನರೇಂದ್ರ	Om Sai Prakash	Jaggesh, Srishanthi, Srinath, Jai Jagadish, Sindhuja	V. Manohar
Jaana	ಜಾಣ	Shivamani	V. Ravichandran, Kasthuri, Shruti, Anjana, B. C. Patil	Hamsalekha
Karulina Koogu	ಕರುಳಿನ ಕೂಗು	D. Rajendra Babu	Tiger Prabhakar, Vinaya Prasad, Srinath, Umashree, Doddanna	Hamsalekha
Kaveri Theeradalli	ಕಾವೇರಿ ತೀರದಲ್ಲಿ	S. Narayan	Raghuveer, Usha, Sangeetha, K. S. Ashwath	Vijay Anand
Keralida Sarpa	ಕೆರಳಿದ ಸರ್ಪ	H. N. Shankar	Kumar Bangarappa, Yamuna, Ramesh Bhat	Sangeetha Raja
Kiladigalu	ಕಿಲಾಡಿಗಳು	Dwarakish	Vishnuvardhan, Dwarakish, Swarna, Avinash	Raj–Koti
Kotreshi Kanasu	ಕೊಟ್ರೇಶಿ ಕನಸು	Nagathihalli Chandrashekar	Vijay Raghavendra, Karibasavaiah, Umashri	C. Ashwath
Kunthi Puthra	ಕುಂತಿ ಪುತ್ರ	Vijay	Vishnuvardhan, Shashikumar, Sonakshi	Vijay Anand
Lockup Death	ಲಾಕ್ಅಪ್ ಡೆತ್	Om Prakash Rao	Devaraj, Nirosha, Sai Kumar, Prakash Rai, Vajramuni, Silk Smitha	Hamsalekha
Looti Gang	ಲೂಟಿ ಗ್ಯಾಂಗ್	B. Ramamurthy	Devaraj, Anjana, Mukhyamantri Chandru, Komal Kumar	V. Manohar
Love 94	ಲವ್ ೯೪	G. K. Mudduraj	Abhishek, Sanghavi, Lakshmi	V. Manohar
Mahakshathriya	ಮಹಾಕ್ಷತ್ರಿಯ	Rajendra Singh Babu	Vishnuvardhan, Sonu Walia, Sudharani, Ramkumar, Shankar Ashwath	Hamsalekha
Mahashakti Maye	ಮಹಾಶಕ್ತಿ ಮಾಯೆ	Om Shakti Jagadishan	Kalyan Kumar, B. Saroja Devi, K. R. Vijaya, Vinaya Prasad, Lokesh	Hemanth Kumar
Makkala Sakshi	ಮಕ್ಕಳ ಸಾಕ್ಷಿ	Kishore Sarja	Baby Shamili, Master Anand, Puneet Issar, Srinivasa Murthy, Silk Smitha, Dolly	Hamsalekha
Mandyada Gandu	ಮಂಡ್ಯದ ಗಂಡು	A. T. Raghu	Ambareesh, Sreeshanti, Meghana, Vajramuni	Upendra Kumar
Megha Maale	ಮೇಘ ಮಾಲೆ	S. Narayan	Sunaad Raj, Vijayashree, S. Narayan, M. P. Shankar	Hamsalekha
Mr. Mahesh Kumar	ಮಿಸ್ಟರ್ ಮಹೇಶ್ ಕುಮಾರ್	Tiger Prabhakar	Tiger Prabhakar, Shruti, Dolly, Ramakrishna	Hamsalekha
Murder	ಮರ್ಡರ್	Mandya Nagraj	Suresh Heblikar, Anjali Sudhakar, Prakash Rai, Nagesh Kashyap	Guna Singh
Musuku	ಮುಸುಕು	P. H. Vishwanath	Ambareesh, Dolly, Ramesh Aravind, K. S. Ashwath, Vajramuni	Hamsalekha
Mutthanna	ಮುತ್ತಣ್ಣ	M. S. Rajashekar	Shivarajkumar, Shashikumar, Supriya, Bhavyasree Rai, Doddanna	Hamsalekha
Nyayakkagi Saval	ನ್ಯಾಯಕ್ಕಾಗಿ ಸವಾಲ್	Beema Nagaraj	Devaraj, Raghuveer, Shruti, Tara	Manoranjan Prabhakar
Odahuttidavaru	ಒಡಹುಟ್ಟಿದವರು	Dorai-Bhagavan	Rajkumar, Ambareesh, Madhavi, Sreeshanti, Umashree, Vajramuni	Upendra Kumar
Prema Simhasana	ಪ್ರೇಮ ಸಿಂಹಾಸನ	S. V. Prasad	Jaggesh, Raagini, Shivaranjini, Srinath, Jayanthi	V. Manohar
Rashmi	ರಶ್ಮಿ	K. V. Jayaram	Abhijeeth, Shruti, Sindhu Menon	Agasthya
Rasika	ರಸಿಕ	Dwarakish	V. Ravichandran, Bhanupriya, Shruti, Dwarakish, Rockline Venkatesh, Jayanthi, Puneet Issar	Hamsalekha
Rayara Maga	ರಾಯರ ಮಗ	G. K. Mudduraj	Jaggesh, Sanghavi, Srinath, Lakshmi	V. Manohar
Sagara Deepa	ಸಾಗರ ದೀಪ	T. S. Nagabharana	Raghavendra Rajkumar, Supriya, Sribharathi, Vajramuni, Srinath	Upendra Kumar
Sammilana	ಸಮ್ಮಿಲನ	H. R. Bhargava	Shashikumar, Shruti, Tara, K. S. Ashwath	Hamsalekha
Samrat	ಸಾಮ್ರಾಟ್	Naganna	Vishnuvardhan, Vinaya Prasad, Soumya Kulkarni, Ramesh Bhat, Vajramuni, Puneet Issar	Hamsalekha
Sididedda Pandavaru	ಸಿಡಿದೆದ್ದ ಪಾಂಡವರು	Om Sai Prakash	Shashikumar, Mohini, Vivek, Siddharth, Balaji	Hamsalekha
Sididedda Shiva	ಸಿಡಿದೆದ್ದ ಶಿವ	K. Suresh Reddy	Thiagarajan, Poornima, Ramesh Bhat, Anjali Sudhakar, Prathap	V. Manohar
Swathi	ಸ್ವಾತಿ	Shivamani	Shashikumar, Sudharani, Vajramuni, Umashree	M. M. Keeravani
Thanike	ತನಿಖೆ	Niranjan	Gulzar Khan, Sujatha, Disco Shanti	R. Damodar
Thooguve Krishnana	ತೂಗುವೆ ಕೃಷ್ಣನ	Vasantha Kunigal	Ananth Nag, Soundarya, Leelavathi, Srinath	Manoranjan Prabhakar
Time Bomb	ಟೈಮ್ ಬಾಂಬ್	Joe Simon	Vishnuvardhan, Tiger Prabhakar, Shruti, Puneet Issar, Devaraj, Soumya Kulkarni	Hamsalekha
Vijaya Kankana	ವಿಜಯ ಕಂಕಣ	Shankarlinga Gowda	Ambareesh, Devaraj, Sudharani, Shruti	Amara Priya
Yarigu Helbedi	ಯಾರಿಗೂ ಹೇಳ್ಬೇಡಿ	Kodlu Ramakrishna	Ananth Nag, Vinaya Prasad, Tara, Vanitha Vasu, Lokesh	Rajan–Nagendra

== See also ==
- Kannada films of 1993
- Kannada films of 1995
