= Ratha Sapthami (film) =

Rathasapthami
- Poster
- Directed by: M. S. Rajashekar
- Written by: Chi. Udaya Shankar; P. Vasu
- Based on: Ratha Sapthami (novel) by Vidyullatha Sasanur
- Produced by: S. A. Govindaraj
- Starring: Shiva Rajkumar; Asharani
- Cinematography: V. K. Kannan
- Edited by: P. Bhakthavathsalam
- Music by: Upendra Kumar
- Distributed by: Bhagavathi Combines
- Release date: 12 December 1986
- Running time: 150 minutes
- Country: India
- Language: Kannada

Ratha Sapthami is a 1986 Indian Kannada-language romantic musical film directed by M. S. Rajashekar and produced by S. A. Govindaraj. It stars Shiva Rajkumar in his second venture after Anand. Debutant actress Niveditha Arjun (credited as Asha Rani) and playwright Parvathavani also star in the movie. The musical score was composed by Upendra Kumar, while the lyrics, screenplay and dialogues written by Chi. Udayashankar. P. Vasu was the co-screenplay writer of this movie. He later remade the movie in Tamil in 1996 as Love Birds. The story is based on a Kannada novel of the same name by Vidyullatha Sasanur, wife of Vijaya Sasanur. Ratha Sapthami opened on 12 December 1986 and was declared a musical blockbuster.

The interval twist of the film where the hero supposedly dies in an accident and the second half of the film where the heroine is sent out of her hometown to overcome her depression but is shell-shocked to catch a glimpse of hero's lookalike in a vehicle nearby, and later finds him dancing merrily in a discotheque — went on to be reused in the 2000 Hindi film Kaho Naa... Pyaar Hai.

== Cast ==
- Shiva Rajkumar as Vishwanath/Lawrence
- Niveditha Arjun (credited as Asha Rani) as Deepa
- Srinath
- Roopa Devi
- Doddanna as Srikantaiah, Deepa's father
- Parvathavani as Srikantaiah's father
- Kanchana as Sharada, Vishwa's mother
- Rajeshwari
- Prashanthi Nayak
- Sudha Narasimharaju as Sumathi, Vishwa's younger sister
- Kumari Rekha
- Mysore Lokesh
- Shivaprakash
- Thimmaiah
- Sadashiva Brahmavar
- Bharathish
- Bheema Rao
- Aravind as Jagadish
- Chi Ravishankar
- Honnavalli Krishna
- Krishna
- Balaraj
- Sundar Raj

== Soundtrack ==
Soundtrack was composed by Upendra Kumar, with lyrics written by Chi. Udayashankar.

No.	Title	Singer(s)	Length
1.	"Ananda Seri Haadalu"	S. P. Balasubrahmanyam
2.	"Nee Yaaru Naan Yaaru"	S. P. Balasubrahmanyam
3.	"Jotheyagi Hithavagi"	S. P. Balasubrahmanyam, S. Janaki
4.	"Olave Hoovagi"	S. P. Balasubrahmanyam
5.	"Shilegalu Sangeethava"	S. P. Balasubrahmanyam, S. Janaki

== Release ==
After Anand (1986), Rathasapthami alongside Manamecchida Hudugi (1987), became commercially successful, earning Shivarajkumar the nickname of Hat-trick Hero, coined by the media and his fans.
