= 1994–95 Karnataka State Film Awards =

Annual Indian film awards ceremony

The Karnataka State Film Awards 1994–95, presented by the Government of Karnataka, honoured the best of Kannada Cinema releases in the year 1994.

== Lifetime achievement award ==
Name of Award	Awardee(s)	Awarded As
• Dr. Rajkumar Award • Puttanna Kanagal Award	• Pandari Bai • K. S. L. Swamy	• Actress-Supporting Actress • Director

== Film awards ==
Name of Award	Film	Producer	Director
First Best Film	Gangavva Gangamaayi	Chandulal Jain	Vasanth Mokashi
Second Best Film	Aragini	• B. N. Ravikumar • R. Prakash	P. H. Vishwanath
Third Best Film	Yarigu Helbedi	• Asha Gunashekar • Padmalatha	Kodlu Ramakrishna
Best Film Of Social Concern	Kotreshi Kanasu	G. Nandakumar	Nagathihalli Chandrashekar

== Other awards ==
Name of Award	Film	Awardee(s)
Best Direction	Gangavva Gangamaayi	Vasanth Mokashi
Best Actor	Gangavva Gangamaayi	Anant Nag
Best Actress	Aagatha	Shruthi
Best Supporting Actor	Kotreshi Kanasu	Karibasavaiah
Best Supporting Actress	Kotreshi Kanasu	Umashree
Best Child Actor	Thaayi Illada Thavaru	H. Anand
Best Music Direction	Haalunda Thavaru	Hamsalekha
Best Male Playback Singer	Thaayi Illada Thavaru ("Arishina Kumkuma")	Rajkumar
Best Female Playback Singer	Rashmi ("Ibbani Thabbida")	B. R. Chaya
Best Cinematography	Aragini	R. Manjunath
Best Editing	Lockup Death	R. Janardhan
Best Lyrics	Haalunda Thavaru ("Ele Hombisile")	Hamsalekha
Best Sound Recording	Aragini	V. Balachandra Menon
Best Art Direction	Gangavva Gangamaayi	• Ramesh Desai • Nanjundaswamy
Best Story Writer	Gangavva Gangamaayi	Shankar Mokashi Punekar
Best Screenplay	Curfew	H. S. Rajashekar
Best Dialogue Writer	Yarigu Helbedi	Kunigal Nagabhushan
Jury's Special Award	Lockup Death	Thriller Manju (For Stunts)
