= Annakili Sonna Kathai =

- Title card
- Directed by: S. Devaraj
- Screenplay by: S. Devaraj
- Story by: Kum. Veerabhadrappa
- Produced by: R. Dhanalakshmi
- Starring: Sathyaraj; Sudha Rani
- Cinematography: R. Somasundaram
- Edited by: B. Kandhasamy; B.K. Mohan
- Music by: Chandrabose
- Production company: Sri Ananda Lakshmi Fim Combines
- Release date: 1 September 1989
- Country: India
- Language: Tamil

Annakili Sonna Kathai (transl. The story told by Annakili) is a 1989 Indian Tamil-language film directed by S. Devaraj. It is a remake of the Kannada film Manamecchida Hudugi (1987), which itself is an adaptation of Bete, a novel by Kum. Veerabhadrappa. The film stars Sathyaraj and Sudha Rani, who reprised her role from the original. It was released on 1 September 1989.

== Cast ==
- Sathyaraj
- Anand Kumar
- Sudha Rani
- Manickaraj
- Malaysia Vasudevan
- Kamala Kamesh
- Shanmugasundaram

== Soundtrack ==
Soundtrack was composed by Chandrabose. Lyrics were written by Mu. Metha.

Track listing
No.	Title	Singer(s)	Length
1.	"Bannari"	Malaysia Vasudevan
2.	"Aathukulle"	Deepan Chakravarthy, Vanitha
3.	"Naaval Pazhame"	Mano, S. P. Sailaja
4.	"Kanmaniye"	S. P. Balasubrahmanyam, K. S. Chithra
