= Anand (1986 film) =

1986 film by Singeetam Srinivasa Rao

- Film poster
- Directed by: Singeetam Srinivasa Rao
- Screenplay by: Singeetham Srinivasa Rao; Chi. Udaya Shankar
- Story by: Singeetham Srinivasa Rao
- Produced by: Parvathamma Rajkumar
- Starring: Shiva Rajkumar; Sudha Rani
- Cinematography: B. C. Gowrishankar
- Edited by: P. Bhaktavatsalam
- Music by: Shankar–Ganesh
- Production company: Dakshayini Combines
- Release date: 19 June 1986
- Running time: 144 minutes
- Country: India
- Language: Kannada

Anand is a 1986 Indian Kannada-language film written and directed by Singeetham Srinivasa Rao. It stars Shiva Rajkumar and Sudha Rani with both making their debuts. The film went on to be a huge success running for 38 weeks.

This was Shiva Rajkumar's first of the three consecutive hits at the box-office on debut which gave him the title Hat-trick Hero. He said, "I can never forget Anand, my first film which made me an actor. Singeetam was just explaining the scene to us and was telling this is what the work I expect from you people. He was bringing out such better performance from all of us".

== Cast ==
- Shiva Rajkumar as Anand
- Sudha Rani as Mala, Anand's love interest
- Rajesh as Raja Chandrashekhar
- Tara as Asha
- Shubha as Kumuda, Raja Chandrashekhar's wife
- Jayanthi as Anand's mother
- Thoogudeepa Srinivas as Prajakoogu editor Narahari
- Chi. Udaya Shankar as Kumar, Mala's father
- Chi. Guru Dutt as Srikanth, Kumuda's son
- Kumari Nayana
- Balaraj
- Honnavalli Krishna
- Chi. Ravishankar
- G. R. Bheemarao
- Pranaya Murthy
- Ashish Vidyarthi in an uncredited role

== Production ==
The song "Tuvvi Tuvvi" showcased landmarks of Bangalore such as Central Library, Cubbon Park and the Bangalore University Campus".

== Soundtrack ==
The music is composed by the duo Shankar–Ganesh with lyrics by Chi. Udayashankar.

Song	Singer(s)
"Neela Megha"	S. P. Balasubrahmanyam, S. Janaki
"Tuvvi Tuvvi"	S.P. Balasubramanyam
"Tick Tick"	S.P. Balasubramanyam
"Mogavu Chenna"	S.P. Balasubramanyam, S. Janaki
"Thimma Thimma "	Vani Jayaram, Ramesh

== Release ==
Anand alongside Ratha Sapthami (1986) and Manamecchida Hudugi (1987) became commercially successful, earning Shivarajkumar the nickname "Hat-trick Hero", coined by the media and his fans.

== Awards ==
- Karnataka State Film Award for Best Supporting Actress - Jayanthi
- Karnataka State Film Award for Best Screenplay - Singeetham Srinivasa Rao, Chi. Udaya Shankar
- Filmfare Award for Best Actor – Kannada - Shiva Rajkumar
