= Ganda Mane Makkalu =

- Directed by: T. P. Gajendran
- Screenplay by: T. P. Gajendran
- Story by: T. Durairaj
- Produced by: Dwarakish
- Starring: Srinath; Vanisri; Sudha Rani; Ramesh Aravind
- Cinematography: R Deviprasad
- Edited by: Ganesh Kumar
- Music by: Vijay Anand
- Production company: Dwaraka Films
- Release date: 4 July 1988
- Country: India
- Language: Kannada

Ganda Mane Makkalu (transl. Husband, home, children) is a 1988 Indian Kannada-language drama film co-written and directed by T. P. Gajendran and produced by Dwarakish. The film stars Srinath, Vanisri, Sudha Rani, and Ramesh Aravind. The film is a remake of the director's Veedu Manaivi Makkal.

== Cast ==
- Srinath
- Dwarakish
- Vanisri
- Sudha Rani
- Srinivasa Murthy
- P Vadiraj
- Anand Babu
- B M Venkatesh
- Ramesh Aravind
- Rathnakar
- Jr Narasimharaju
- Sathyabhama
- Vanitha Vasu

== Production ==
Dwarakish decided to make this film when Vinod Raj and Sudha Rani were feeling ill for a two month period during the making of Krishna Nee Kunidaga. The film marked the return of Vanisri after a hiatus of around ten years and she was paired opposite Srinath.

== Soundtrack ==
The soundtrack was composed by Vijay Anand.

Track listing
No.	Title	Lyrics	Singer(s)	Length
1.	"Illi Nodu Kuniyuva Bombe"	R. N. Jayagopal	Mano
2.	"Sarasavo Saligeyo"	Chi. Udayashankar	Mano, Manjula Gururaj
3.	"Namma Hosa Maneyantha"	R. N. Jayagopal	Manohar, Dwarakish, Manjula Gururaj, Usha Ganesh
4.	"Kattu Mane Kattu"	R. N. Jayagopal	Mano, Jyothi
5.	"Ganda Mane Makkalu"	R. N. Jayagopal	Mano

== Release ==
The movie under-performed at the box-office similar to many of Dwarakish's productions at the time.
