= Ee Preethi Yeke Bhoomi Melide =

- Directed by: Prem
- Written by: Prem
- Produced by: P. Krishna Prasad
- Starring: Prem; Namratha; Rohini
- Cinematography: M. R. Seenu
- Edited by: Srinivas P. Babu
- Music by: R. P. Patnaik (songs); V. Harikrishna (background score)
- Production company: Ashwini Productions
- Release date: 28 December 2007
- Running time: 162 min.
- Country: India
- Language: Kannada

Ee Preethi Yeke Bhoomi Melide (transl. Why The Love Exists on The Earth?) is a 2007 Indian Kannada-language romance film directed, written and enacted by Prem. The film also features Rohini, Namratha and Sharan in other pivotal roles. Bollywood actress Mallika Sherawat appeared in a special dance number whilst actors Ambareesh, Sudharani and Vinaya Prasad appeared in brief cameo roles. The film had musical soundtrack scored by R. P. Patnaik whilst the background score was V. Harikrishna.

The film opened on 28 December 2007 to mixed reviews and performed badly at the box-office.

== Cast ==
- Prem as Chandra
- Rohini as Sowmya
- Namratha as Sandhya
- Sharan
- Ramesh Bhat
- Raghu Ram
- Layendra
- Sihi Kahi Chandru
- Master Kishan
- Tejaswini Prakash
- Mallika Sherawat in an item song
- Ambareesh in guest appearance
- Sudharani in guest appearance
- Vinaya Prasad in guest appearance
- B. Jayashree in guest appearance

== Soundtrack ==
The film's score and soundtrack was composed by R. P. Patnaik.

Track-list
| No. | Title | Lyrics | Singer(s) | Length |
|---|---|---|---|---|
| 1. | "Neenene Neenene" | Kaviraj | Roop Kumar Rathod, K. S. Chithra | 4:52 |
| 2. | "Magalu Doddavaladalu" | Prem | C. Ashwath, Prem, Kalpana Patowary | 4:55 |
| 3. | "Barayya Barayya" | Sudarshan | Shankar Mahadevan, Supriya Acharya | 5:35 |
| 4. | "Chandamama Kaige" | Prem | Shreya Ghoshal | 2:09 |
| 5. | "Ee Jana Ee Mana" | Prem | R. P. Patnaik, Nihaal | 3:32 |
| 6. | "Chandamama Baa" | Kaviraj | Shreya Ghoshal | 4:41 |
| 7. | "Kallanivanu" | V. Nagendra Prasad | Nithyashree Mahadevan, Rajesh Krishnan | 4:16 |
| 8. | "Oh Huduga" | Kaviraj | Kunal Ganjawala, K. S. Chithra | 4:21 |
| 9. | "Sulle Sullu" | Prem | Kailash Kher, Shankar Mahadevan | 4:24 |
| 10. | "Ee Preethi Yeke" | Prem | Prem | 5:38 |

== Reception ==
=== Critical response ===
A critic from Rediff.com wrote that "The film starts off slowly and drags right until the end". A critic from Deccan Herald wrote that "The director has spent considerable energy, thinking out and using every trick in the trade; a small portion of spending the same energy on a coherent script would have been the icing on a cake".
