= Aragini =

Kannada-language, romantic drama film

- Directed by: P. H. Vishwanath
- Written by: P. H. Vishwanath
- Produced by: B. N. Ravishankar; R. Prakash
- Starring: Ramesh Aravind; Sudha Rani
- Cinematography: R. Manjunath
- Edited by: Suresh Urs
- Music by: S. P. Venkatesh
- Production company: Hitech Creations
- Release date: 9 January 1995
- Running time: 130 mins
- Country: India
- Language: Kannada

Aragini is a 1995 Kannada-language, romantic drama film written and directed by P. H. Vishwanath. It stars Ramesh Aravind and Sudha Rani in lead roles along with Sanketh Kashi, Ramesh Bhat and Padma Vasanthi in key supporting roles. The music is composed by S. P. Venkatesh.

The film, upon release, proved to be successful at the box-office and went on to win several awards at 1994-95 Karnataka State Film Awards.

== Cast ==
- Ramesh Aravind as Sathya
- Sudha Rani as Rani
- Sanketh Kashi
- Ramesh Bhat
- Ramesh Pandit
- Padma Vasanthi
- Sihi Kahi Geetha

== Production ==
P. H. Vishwanath was set to make a film with Ramesh Aravind about two thieves co-starring Baby Shamili. After a film with a similar storyline starring Baby Shamili was released, Vishwanath changed the story in two days and cast Sudha Rani as her dates were readily available.

== Soundtrack ==
Aragini

Film score by S. P. Venkatesh
- Released: 1995
- Genre: Soundtrack
- Length: 20:46
- Producer: S. P. Venkatesh

Music composed by S. P. Venkatesh.

S. No.	Song title	Lyrics	Singers	length
1	"Kanna Muchche"	Doddarange Gowda	S. P. Balasubrahmanyam, K. S. Chithra	4:54
2	"Kusumavu Neenu"	Nagathihalli Chandrashekar	S. P. Balasubrahmanyam, K. S. Chithra	4:44
3	"Andu Naanu Yaro"	M. N. Vyasa Rao	K. S. Chithra	3:34
4	"Midiyuthire Hrudaya"	Geethapriya	S. P. Balasubrahmanyam	3:55
5	"Mereva Hareya Baralu"	Doddarange Gowda	K. S. Chithra	4.05

== Awards ==
- Karnataka State Film Award for Second Best Film
- Karnataka State Film Award for Best Cinematographer - R. Manjunath
- Karnataka State Film Award for Best Sound Recording - V. Balachandra Menon
