= Idu Entha Premavayya =

Idu Entha Premavayya..!
- OTT thumbnail
- Directed by: Kodlu Ramakrishna
- Written by: Purushottham Kanagal (dialogues)
- Screenplay by: Kodlu Ramakrishna; K. V. Raju; Joe Simon
- Story by: Kodlu Ramakrishna
- Produced by: Basavaraj Sogaladh; Anand B. Sogaladh; Sangayya C. Panchkatti Matt
- Starring: Ramesh Aravind; Shilpa
- Cinematography: B. S. Basavaraj
- Edited by: Basavaraj Urs
- Music by: Gurukiran
- Production company: Shri Vaibhavalakshmi Pictures
- Release date: 28 April 1999
- Country: India
- Language: Kannada

Idu Entha Premavayya..! (transl. What kind of love is this..!) is a 1999 Indian Kannada-language romantic drama film directed by Kodlu Ramakrishna and starring Ramesh Aravind and Shilpa. The film's plot is inspired by the Hindi film Kaamchor (1982), which itself was a remake of the Telugu film Subhodayam (1980).

The film follows Arun, a lazy man, marries Apoorva, a rich woman, for her money. However, she discovers his true intentions and leaves him, making him realise his mistake and try to win her over again.

== Plot ==
Arun has been an aimless and lazy slacker all his adult life, and has no goals for his future. He lives with his brother, sister-in-law, and nephew Santhosh. On one occasion, he gate crashes one of his brother's supervisor's friend's wedding ceremony and finds out that the would-be groom is to live with his in-laws. To Arun's delight, he finds out that the bride Aparna has an unmarried sister Apoorva. They both are the daughters of a rich industrialist, Karanam Sadashiva Rai. Friendship develops between Arun and Apoorva and she helps him get a job in her father's company. Later Arun convinces her father, and marries her.

== Cast ==
- Ramesh Aravind as Arun
- Shilpa as Apoorva
- Charulatha as Aparna
- Rajesh as Karanam Sadashiva Rai
- Jai Jagadish as Aparna's husband
- Avinash as Arun's brother
- Kunigal Nagabhushan as Sadashiva Rai's friend
- Dingri Nagaraj as Naga
- Padma Vasanthi as Arun's sister-in-law
- Master Santhosh as Santhosh
- Shivadhwaj
- Shrishailan
- M. S. Karanth
- R. G. Vijayasarathy as Search Warrant Officer (uncredited)

== Production ==
The film was initially titled Idu Entha Premaa, and was the debut production of Shri Vaibhavalakshmi Pictures. One of the film's producers, Sangayyapanchkatti Matt, used to work as a correspondent at Samyukta Karnataka.

This was Ramesh Aravind's first film to feature him wearing a cap. This was Kodlu Ramakrishna's first film to have a court scene, and his first film to be shot outside of Bangalore after a song was canned in Ooty. Two scenes were shot at a temple in Banashankari: the scene where Ramesh Aravind chases a production boy and the scene where he tells jokes to Shilpa.

== Soundtrack ==
The music was composed by Gurukiran and released under the Akash Audio music label. The title track "Yeneno Kanasu Kandalu", was notably written by a female: Asha Kadpatti from Belgaum.

No.	Title	Lyrics	Singer(s)	Length
1.	"Andada Chandramancha"		Rajesh Krishnan, Manjula Gururaj	4:31
2.	"Bandaalo Bandaalo"	Doddarangegowda	Mohammed Haneef, Nanditha	4:58
3.	"Doctoru Aadarunu"		S. P. Balasubrahmanyam	4:18
4.	"Ninna Aasegale"	D Bharath	K. S. Chithra, P. Unnikrishnan	5:07
5.	"Soniya O Soniya"		Gurukiran, Anuradha Sriram, Shankar Shanbhag	4:45
6.	"Yeneno Kanasu Kandalu"	Asha Kadapatti	Dr. Rajkumar	5:03
Total length:				28:42

== Home media ==
A scene from this film was posted by Colors Kannada on 15 March 2020. The film was telecast on Colors Kannada on 21 July 2022.
