= Kulla Kulli =

- Directed by: H. R. Bhargava
- Written by: Chi. Udaya Shankar
- Screenplay by: M. D. Sundar
- Story by: M. D. Sundar
- Produced by: Dwarakish
- Starring: Dwarakish; Jayachitra; Balakrishna; Tiger Prabhakar
- Cinematography: D. V. Rajaram
- Edited by: N. G. Victor; Bal G. Yadav
- Music by: Rajan–Nagendra
- Production company: Dwarakish Chithra
- Distributed by: Dwarakish Chithra
- Release date: 1980
- Running time: 142 minutes
- Country: India
- Language: Kannada

Kulla Kulli is a 1980 Indian Kannada-language action comedy film directed by H. R. Bhargava and produced by Dwarakish. The film stars Dwarakish and Jayachitra in the lead roles, while T. N. Balakrishna and Tiger Prabhakar appear in supporting roles. The film has a musical score by Rajan–Nagendra.

== Cast ==
- Dwarakish as Krishna alias Kulla
- Jayachitra as Chitra alias Kulli
- Sudha Rani as young Chitra (credited as Baby Jayashree)
- Baby Rekha
- Tiger Prabhakar as Jeeva
- T. N. Balakrishna as Venkateshaiah
- Sundar Krishna Urs as Parashuraj
- Leelavathi as Krishna's mother
- Chethan Ramarao
- Thoogudeepa Srinivas as gym trainer (cameo)
- Uma Shivakumar as Sundari (cameo)
- Vijay
- Lakshman as Jeeva's aide
- Master Rajesh
- Ashwath Narayan
- G. R. Bheema Rao
- Shivaprakash
- G. Kashinath
- Halam as dancer
- Sathish Thunga

== Soundtrack ==
The music was composed by Rajan–Nagendra.

No.	Song	Singers	Lyrics	Length (m:ss)
1	"Habba Banthalla"	S. Janaki, S. P. Balasubrahmanyam	Chi. Udaya Shankar	04:30
2	"Driving Maadtheeya"	S. Janaki, Nagendra	Chi. Udaya Shankar	04:34
3	"Ye Kulla"	S. Janaki, S. P. Balasubrahmanyam	Chi. Udaya Shankar	02:23
4	"Ellige Hogali"	S. P. Balasubrahmanyam	Chi. Udaya Shankar	04:26
