= Bhagyada Balegara (film) =

2009 film by Om Sai Prakash

- VCD cover
- Directed by: Om Sai Prakash
- Written by: Ajay Kumar
- Produced by: Ramesh Kashyap
- Starring: Shiva Rajkumar; Navya Nair
- Cinematography: M. R. Seenu
- Edited by: P. R. Soundar Raj
- Music by: Ilayaraja
- Production company: Simhadri Productions
- Release date: 11 September 2009
- Running time: 154 minutes
- Country: India
- Language: Kannada

Bhagyada Balegara is a 2009 Kannada drama film directed by Om Sai Prakash and written by Ajay Kumar. The film features Shiva Rajkumar and Navya Nair whilst Adi Lokesh, Anu Prabhakar and Sudharani play the supporting roles.

The film featured original score and soundtrack composed by Ilayaraja. The soundtrack included two of the most popular folk songs in Kannada.

== Cast ==
- Shiva Rajkumar as Chennaiah
- Navya Nair as Cheluvi
- Adi Lokesh
- Sathyajith as Siddanna
- Doddanna
- Sadhu Kokila
- Shobha Raghavendra as Sakavva
- Padma Vasanthi as Savitri
- Sudha Belawadi
- Padmini Prakash
- Ashalatha
- M. N. Lakshmi Devi
- Suresh Chandra as Shivarame Gowda
- Suresh Mangalore as Govinda
- Ramesh Kashyap as Ramesh
- Anu Prabhakar
- Sudharani in a special appearance in song "Ghallu Ghallenutha"
- Ashwath Narayan
- Raghuram
- Ramesh Bhat in a special appearance in song "Budu Budu Kayya"

== Soundtrack ==
The music was composed by Ilayaraja including the title song inspired from the popular folk song. The audio was received with positive reviews.

Track listing
No.	Title	Lyrics	Singer(s)	Length
1.	"Nannane Noduvanu"	Kaviraj	Ilayaraja, Shreya Ghoshal
2.	"Jhallu Jhallu"	V. Nagendra Prasad	Kunal Ganjawala
3.	"Madhu Magalu"	Kaviraj	Udit Narayan, K. S. Chithra
4.	"Balegara Balegara"	V. Nagendra Prasad	Kunal Ganjawala, Shreya Ghoshal
5.	"Chendulli Chendulli"	V. Nagendra Prasad	Ilayaraja, Shreya Ghoshal
6.	"Ghallu Ghallenutha"	Traditional folk	Karthik, Manjari
7.	"Budu Budu Kavya"	V. Nagendra Prasad	L. N. Shastry
8.	"Bhagyada Balegara"	Traditional folk	Rita, Tippu

== Reception ==
R G Vijayasarathy of Rediff.com scored the film at 2 out of 5 stars and says "Technically the film is average and that includes the camera work by M R Seenu. Bhagyadha Balegaara can be watched only for the splendid performances of Shivaraj Kumar and Navya Nair, and Ilayaraja's well picturised three songs". A critic from Deccan Herald wrote "Saiprakash chose not to make use of these things, thereby rendering the film a little weak. Coming back to the film, Seenu’s camera seems to have caught the flu bug, leaving an unsatisfactory finish or perhaps it is a manifestation of lack of funds". A critic from The Times of India wrote "Apart from a lively performance from Shivrajkumar, Navya Nair excels. Shobha Raghavendra is brilliant. M R Seenus camerawork is okay. Ilayarajas good music score and Malavalli Saikrishnas catchy dialogues are the other highlights".
