= Kiladi Kittu =

- Directed by: K. S. R. Das
- Screenplay by: Chi. Udaya Shankar (dialogue)
- Story by: M. D. Sundar
- Produced by: D. T. S. Rao; Y. R. Ashwath Narayana Rao; D. S. Narasinga Rao
- Starring: Vishnuvardhan; Rajinikanth
- Edited by: P. Venkateshwara Rao, K. S. R. Das
- Music by: Mohan Kumar
- Release date: 3 March 1978
- Running time: 140 minutes
- Country: India
- Language: Kannada

Kiladi Kittu is a 1978 Indian Kannada-language film directed by K.S.R. Das. The film starred Vishnuvardhan and Rajinikanth. The music for the film was composed by Mohan Kumar. The director remade the film in Telugu in 1981 as Black Cobra.

== Cast ==
- Vishnuvardhan as Kittu
- Rajinikanth as Inspector Srikanth
- Leelavathi
- Pandhari Bai
- Kavitha as Geetha
- Vajramuni
- B. Jaya
- Shivaram
- Baby Jayashree
- Narasimha Raju as Achchanna
- T. N. Balakrishna as Muttanna
- Shakti Prasad
- Rathnakar
- Chethan Ramarao
- Mysore Lokesh
- Fighter Shetty

== Production ==
Jayashree, later known as Sudha Rani, was three years old when signing the film, her debut. Her brother Murali appeared as the younger version of Rajinikanth's character.

== Soundtrack ==
The music of Kiladi Kittu was composed by Mohan Kumar.

Track listing
No.	Title	Lyrics	Singer(s)	Length
1.	"Taavare Hoovu Yee Ninna"	Chi. Udaya Shankar	S. P. Balasubrahmanyam
2.	"Hoovante Hennu"	Chi. Udaya Shankar	Yesudas	3:16
3.	"Nanna ninna Olavu Madhura"	Vijaya Narasimha	S. P. Balasubrahmanyam, S. Janaki
4.	"Madilalli Maguvagi Naanu"	R. N. Jayagopal	Vishnuvardhan, P. Susheela
5.	"Ee Cheluvu Seleva Naguvu"	R. N. Jayagopal	S. P. Balasubrahmanyam, S. Janaki
6.	"Manasanu Kodu"		S. Janaki
