= Maanasa Sarovara =

1982 Kannada film directed by Puttanna Kanagal

Manasa Sarovara
- VCD cover
- Directed by: Puttanna Kanagal
- Written by: Puttanna Kanagal
- Screenplay by: Puttanna Kanagal
- Produced by: Varghese; Kamalakar; Geetha Srinath; Puttanna Kanagal
- Starring: Srinath; Ramakrishna; Padma Vasanthi
- Cinematography: B. S. Basavaraj
- Edited by: V. P. Krishna
- Music by: Vijaya Bhaskar
- Distributed by: Mithra Vrunda Movies
- Release date: 1982
- Running time: 140 minutes
- Country: India
- Language: Kannada

Manasa Sarovara is a 1982 Indian Kannada-language film directed by Puttanna Kanagal and starring Srinath, Padma Vasanthi and Ramakrishna. Padma Vasanthi won the Karnataka State Film Award for Best Actress for her performance. The plot was reported to be influenced by George Bernard Shaw's 1913 play Pygmalion. The film was remade in Telugu as Amayaka Chakravarthy.

== Plot ==
Dr. Anand is a middle-aged psychiatrist who realizes that his married life has no happiness or peace. Soon his wife leaves him. He returns to his village in an attempt to find peace, and manage his estate. Anand meets Vasanthi on a road, stoning passersby. Seeking to understand her behavior, he meets her brother and finds out that Vasanthi has developed a deep hatred for men after their sister committed suicide, after being dumped by her boyfriend.

The family agrees to Anand's request to take Vasanthi away and cure her. The change in environment and loving care allow Vasanthi to gradually recover from her trauma. During the course of treatment, Dr. Anand ends up falling in love with her. When he is away to attend a seminar, his nephew arrives and Vasanthi falls in love with the nephew. Upon his return, when he finds this out, Dr. Anand is heartbroken. He eventually loses his own sanity, and is left in a state akin to that of Vasanthi when he first met her.

== Cast ==
- Srinath as Dr. Anand
- Ramakrishna as Santosh
- Padma Vasanthi as Vasanthi
- Cudavalli Chandrashekar (Cameo)
- Jai Jagadish (Cameo)
- Rekha Rao (Cameo)
- Vaishali Kasaravalli (Cameo)
- Chandrahasa Alva
- Vijaya Chamundeswari
- G. V. Shivanand
- Mysore Lokesh
- B. K. Shankar
- Sandoor Saikumar
- Nanjunda Arakalagudu

== Production ==
T. N. Seetharam worked as the film's assistant director and dialogue writer. The filming was held at Sandur. Kanagal originally wanted Dwarakish to produce this film but he however refused as he did not like the film's climax.

== Soundtrack ==
Title	Singers	Lyrics
"Manasa Sarovara"	S. P. Balasubrahmanyam, Vani Jairam	Vijaya Narasimha
"Vedanthi Helidanu"	P. B. Sreenivas	G. S. Shivarudrappa
"Keliranna Keli"	C. Ashwath	Karim Khan
"Neene Sakida Gini"	S. P. Balasubrahmanyam	Vijaya Narasimha
"Chanda Chanda"	P. Jayachandran	M. N. Vyasarao
"Haadu Haadu"	Vani Jairam	G. S. Shivarudrappa

== Awards ==
1982–83 Karnataka State Film Awards

- Best Actress — Padma Vasanthi

== Sequel ==
The sequel for the film has been made into a television series and aired on Udaya TV from 26 February 2018. The lead actors from the film reprised their roles in the series.
