= Saptapadi (1992 film) =

- Directed by: H. R. Bhargava
- Written by: Chi. Udaya Shankar
- Screenplay by: Chi. Udaya Shankar
- Based on: Saptapadi by Saisuthe
- Produced by: S. A. Srinivas
- Starring: Ambareesh; Rupini; Sudharani; Anjali Sudhakar
- Cinematography: B. C. Gowrishankar
- Edited by: S. Manohar
- Music by: Upendra Kumar
- Production company: Sri Vahini Cine Combines
- Release date: 20 April 1992
- Running time: 128 minutes
- Country: India
- Language: Kannada

Saptapadi (transl. Seven Steps) is a 1992 Indian Kannada-language romantic drama film directed by H. R. Bhargava and based on the novel of the same name by Saisuthe The film stars Ambareesh, Rupini, Sudharani and Anjali Sudhakar. The film, produced by S. A. Srinivas, was widely appreciated for its songs tuned by Upendra Kumar and lead actors performances upon release.

The film's screenplay, dialogues and lyrics are written by Chi. Udaya Shankar. Cinematography is by B. C. Gowrishankar. It was presented by Rajkumar for Sri Vahini Cine Combines.

The director had revealed that originally Rajkumar was supposed to be the hero of the movie which was to be directed by M. S. Rajashekar. However, Rajkumar later felt a younger actor would be an ideal choice for the lead role and decided to only present the movie with Ambareesh in the lead who in turn suggested Bhargava to be the director since their earlier collaboration had been called off.

== Cast ==
- Ambareesh as Sudhakar
- Rupini as Sahana
- Sudharani as Sudha
- K. S. Ashwath as Sahana's father
- Ramesh Bhat as Sharma
- Sundar Krishna Urs as Ramamurthy
- Prithviraj as Sudha's father
- Anjali Sudhakar as Vijaya
- Girija Lokesh as Jaya
- Seema
- Sheela
- Srimathi Rao
- Sihi Kahi Chandru as Dr. Mahesh Chandra
- Abhijith as Manohar
- M. S. Karanth as Bhavani Shankar Rao
- Rajesh R.
- Shani Mahadevappa as groom's father
- M. S. Umesh as Krishna Murthy
- Kunigal Ramanath
- BEML Somanna
- Devaraj

== Soundtrack ==
The music of the film was composed by Upendra Kumar and lyrics written by Chi. Udaya Shankar and the entire soundtrack was received extremely well. Audio was released on Sangeetha.

Track listing
No.	Title	Lyrics	Singer(s)	Length
1.	"Chinna Nanna"	Chi. Udaya Shankar	S. P. Balasubrahmanyam, Manjula Gururaj
2.	"Baalali Vivaahada"	Chi. Udaya Shankar	S. P. Balasubrahmanyam, Sangeetha Katti
3.	"Hoovu Mullu"	Chi. Udaya Shankar	S. P. Balasubrahmanyam
4.	"Koneyalli Mancha"	Chi. Udaya Shankar	S. P. Balasubrahmanyam, Manjula Gururaj
5.	"Saptapadi Idu Saptapadi"	Chi. Udaya Shankar	Rajkumar
6.	"Karune Thorisamma"	Chi. Udaya Shankar	Sangeetha Katti, Manjula Gururaj
