= Padma Vasanthi =

Indian actress

- Born: Karnataka, India
- Occupation: Film actress

Padma Vasanthi is an Indian actress in the Kannada film industry known for her roles in films like Maanasa Sarovara (1982) Bettada Hoovu (1985), Mussanjemaatu (2008).

== Awards ==
Year	Award	Film	Category	Result
1982–83	Karnataka State Film Awards	Maanasa Sarovara	Best Actress	Won

== Career ==
Padma Vasanthi has been part of more than 130 movies and many soap operas/serials in Kannada industry.

== Selected filmography ==
Year	Film	Role	Notes
1982	Maanasa Sarovara	Vasanthi	Debut
1983	Dharani Mandala Madhyadolage		
1984	Amrutha Ghalige	Renuka	
1984	Runa Mukthalu	Malli	
1985	Bettada Hoovu	Parvati	
1986	Ella Hengasarinda		
1986	Marjala		
1986	Shreemathi Kalyana		
1987	Shivabhakta Markandeya		
1989	Bisilu Beladingalu		
1994	Swathi		
1995	Aragini		
1996	Shiva Leele	Parvati	
1996	Annavra Makkalu		
1996	Bangarada Mane		
1996	Thavarina Thottilu		
1997	Lakshmi Mahalakshmi		
1997	Sangliyana Part-3		
1997	Nee Mudida Mallige		
1997	Cheluva		
1999	Habba		
1999	Idu Entha Premavayya	Arun's sister-in-law	
1999	Arunodaya		
2001	Premakke Sai		
2001	Bahala Chennagide	Saraswati	
2002	Kitty	Sharada	
2003	Daasa		
2003	Thavarige Baa Thangi		
2003	Laali Haadu		
2004	Ajju		
2004	Saradara		
2005	Udees	Parvathi	
2005	Boyfriend	Shiva's mother	
2005	Dr. B. R. Ambedkar		
2006	Care of Footpath		
2006	Shishya		
2006	Hettavara Kanasu		
2006	Savira Mettilu		
2007	Bombugalu Saar Bombugalu		
2008	Vasanthakala		
2008	Mussanjemaatu	Tanu's mother	
2009	Raam		
2009	Bhagyada Balegara	Savitri	
2009	Yodha		
2010	Sathya		
2010	Chirru		
2010	Eno Onthara		
2010	Prithvi	Basavaraj's wife	
2011	Hare Rama Hare Krishna		
2012	Bhagirathi		
2012	Sri Kshetra Adi Chunchanagiri		
2013	Ambara		
2014	Belli	Basavaraj's mother	
2014	Simhadri		
2014	Maanikya	Lakshmi	
2015	Care of Footpath 2		
2016	Bhujanga		
2017	Chalagaara		
2017	Jindaa		
2019	Yada Yada Hi Dharmasya	Jeeva's mother	
2021	Govinda Govinda	Ratnamma	
2022	Athyutthama		
2024	Taj		
2024	Gopilola		
2025	Nimbiya Banada Myaga Page 1		
2025	September 10		
2026	Mavuta		
2026	Simhapuriya Simha		
2026	Gangs of UK		

== Television ==
Year	Serial	Role	Notes
1998	Mayamruga	Sharada/Chawakasi Sharada	
2015	Majaa Talkies		
2018	Kamali	Annapoorna Mahajan	
2022	Kasturi Nivasa	Lakkima	
2023	Preetiya Arasi		

== See also ==
- List of people from Karnataka
- Cinema of Karnataka
- List of Indian film actresses
- Cinema of India
