= Deergha Sumangali =

- VCD cover
- Directed by: D. Rajendra Babu
- Written by: D. Rajendra Babu; Richard Louis (dialogues)
- Screenplay by: D. Rajendra Babu
- Story by: S. P. Rajashekar
- Produced by: D. R. Umashankari; R. Venkata Raju
- Starring: Sithara; Devan; Srinivasa Murthy; B. V. Radha
- Cinematography: Ashok Kashyap
- Edited by: K. Balu
- Music by: Hamsalekha
- Production company: Adithya Movie Makers
- Distributed by: Adithya Movie Makers
- Release date: 10 February 1995
- Running time: 143 min
- Country: India
- Language: Kannada

Deergha Sumangali (Kannada: ದೀರ್ಘ ಸುಮಂಗಲಿ) is a 1995 Indian Kannada film, directed by D. Rajendra Babu and produced by D. R. Umashankari and R. Venkata Raju. The film stars Sithara, Devan, Srinivasa Murthy and B. V. Radha. The film had musical score by Hamsalekha.

== Cast ==
- Vishnuvardhan in Guest Appearance
- Sithara
- Devan
- Srinivasa Murthy
- B. V. Radha
- Lakshman
- Richard Louis
- Ramakrishna
- Srishailan
- M. S. Karanth
- Brahmavar

== Music ==
- "Kaviya Samaya" - S. Janaki, S. P. Balasubrahmanyam
- "Naanu Ninnannu" - Mano
- "Bhumige Devaru" - Mano
- "Baila Baila" - S. Janaki
- "Chandra Manchake" - K. S. Chithra, S. P. Balasubrahmanyam
- "Thavarondu Chinthe" - S. P. Balasubrahmanyam
