= Anupama (1981 film) =

- Directed by: Renuka Sharma
- Written by: Vietnam Veedu Sundaram
- Produced by: B. J. Jayamma
- Starring: Anant Nag; Madhavi; Sudharani
- Cinematography: R. Chittibabu
- Edited by: P. Bhaktavatsalam
- Music by: C. Ashwath; L. Vaidyanathan
- Production company: Vijaya Vinayaka Movie Makers
- Release date: 1981
- Running time: 132 minutes
- Country: India
- Language: Kannada

Anupama is a 1981 Indian Kannada-language romance drama film, directed by Renuka Sharma and written by Vietnam Veedu Sundaram. The film stars Anant Nag and Madhavi. It is the directorial debut of Sharma.

== Cast ==
- Anant Nag as Anant
- Madhavi as Anupama
- T. N. Balakrishna as Govindaiah
- Sudha Sindhur
- Kaminidharan
- Sudha Rani (credited as Baby Jayashree)as young Anupama
- Baby Thanuja
- B. K. Shankar as Shankar
- Dingri Nagaraj as Dingri
- M. S. Umesh as Umesh
- Sharapanjara Iyengar
- Bheema Rao
- Kunigal Ramanath

== Soundtrack ==
All the songs were composed and scored by Ashwath - Vaidi, with lyrics by Doddarangegowda. The songs "Barthaale Kanasina Rani" and "Olume Poojegende" were instant hits and considered as evergreen songs in Kannada cinema.

Song title	Singer(s)
"Barthaale Kanasina Rani"	S. P. Balasubrahmanyam
"Anupama Cheluvu"	S. P. Balasubrahmanyam
"Olume Poojegende"	S. P. Balasubrahmanyam, S. Janaki
"Nanna Moreyu"	S. Janaki
