= Thangakkili =

- Poster
- Directed by: Rajavarman
- Written by: Rajavarman
- Produced by: A. G. Subramaniam
- Starring: Murali; Shaali
- Cinematography: Ravindar
- Edited by: Ganesh Kumar
- Music by: Ilaiyaraaja
- Production company: AGS Movies
- Release date: 4 June 1993
- Country: India
- Language: Tamil

Thangakkili (transl. Golden Parrot) is a 1993 Indian Tamil-language film directed by Rajavarman and produced by A. G. Subramaniam. The film stars Murali and Shaali, with Vijayakumar and Janagaraj in supporting roles. It was released on 4 June 1993.

== Cast ==
- Murali as Raju
- Shaali as Swathi
- Vijayakumar
- Janagaraj
- Senthil
- Srividya
- Charle
- Vasu Vikram
- Kovai Sarala
- Sabitha Anand
- Idichapuli Selvaraj
- LIC Narasimhan
- Kullamani
- Master Haja Sheriff
- King Kong
- R. K. as Raju's friend (uncredited)

== Production ==
The film was shot in Ooty.

== Soundtrack ==
Soundtrack was composed by Ilaiyaraaja.

| Song | Singers | Lyrics | Length |
|---|---|---|---|
| "Ninaikkatha" | S. Janaki | Ponnadiyan | 04:39 |
| "Ninaikkatha" (sad) | S. Janaki, Mano | Ponnadiyan | 04:57 |
| "Thangathadi Manasu" | Mano, Sindhu | Vaali | 04:55 |
| "Naan Deva Devi" | Swarnalatha, Mano | Na. Kamarasan | 05:00 |
| "Eyka Varum" | Mano | Muthulingam | 04:59 |

== Reception ==
Malini Mannath wrote for The Indian Express, "An oft-repeated storyline, clichéd situations, insipid narration, and lackluster performances make Thanga Kili [...] a film to be recommended to one's enemies."
