= Manamecchida Hudugi =

- VCD cover
- Directed by: M. S. Rajashekar
- Screenplay by: Chi. Udayashankar
- Based on: Bete by Kum. Veerabhadrappa
- Produced by: S. A. Chinne Gowda; S. A. Srinivas
- Starring: Shiva Rajkumar; Sudha Rani
- Cinematography: B. C. Gowrishankar
- Edited by: P. Bhakthavatsalam
- Music by: Upendra Kumar
- Production company: Kathyayini Cine Art Combines
- Release date: 31 July 1987
- Running time: 145 minutes
- Country: India
- Language: Kannada

Manamecchida Hudugi ( transl. Favourite Girl) is a 1987 Indian Kannada-language romantic drama film directed by M. S. Rajashekar, starring Shiva Rajkumar, Sudha Rani and Sundar Krishna Urs. The film was produced by S. A. Chinne Gowda and S. A. Srinivas in the banner of Kathyayini Cine Art Combines. Chi. Udayashankar penned the dialogues and wrote the screenplay. The film was based on the novel Bete by Kum. Veerabhadrappa. It was a major success. The film was remade in Tamil as Annakili Sonna Kathai (1989) with Sudha Rani reprising her role.

== Cast ==
- Shiva Rajkumar
- Sudharani
- Sundar Krishna Urs
- Shubha
- N. N. Simha
- Balaraj
- Honnavalli Krishna
- Bhatti Mahadevappa
- Shivaprakash
- Papamma

== Soundtrack ==
The music was composed by Upendra Kumar.

Track listing
No.	Title	Singer(s)	Length
1.	"Halligella Ivane Chenda"	S. Janaki
2.	"Keli Ella Keli"	S. P. Balasubrahmanyam
3.	"Gowramma Ninna Ganda"	S. P. Balasubrahmanyam, S. Janaki
4.	"Ninnane Naanu Benkiyallu Thampu Kandenu"	S. P. Balasubrahmanyam, S. Janaki
5.	"Usire"	S. P. Balasubrahmanyam
6.	"Gowri Mogavu"	S. P. Balasubrahmanyam

== Release ==
After Anand and Ratha Sapthami, Manamecchida Hudugi became commercially successful, earned Shivarajkumar the nickname of Hat-trick Hero, coined by the media and his fans.
