= Krishna Nee Kunidaga =

- Directed by: Dwarakish
- Written by: Dwarakish
- Produced by: Ambuja Dwarakish
- Starring: Vinod Raj; Sudharani; C. R. Simha
- Cinematography: R. Deviprasad
- Edited by: Gouthama Raju
- Music by: Vijay Anand
- Production company: Dwarakish Chitra
- Release date: 1989
- Running time: 137 min
- Country: India
- Language: Kannada

Krishna Nee Kunidaga is a 1989 Indian Kannada-language romantic drama film written, directed and produced by Dwarakish. The film stars Vinod Raj and Sudharani, along with C. R. Simha, Jaggesh and Hema Choudhary in supporting roles. The music was composed by Vijay Anand to the lyrics of Chi. Udaya Shankar, Hamsalekha and R. N. Jayagopal.

== Plot ==
The film told the story of a college student Krishna (Vinod Raj), who aspires to become an accomplished dancer even at the cost of discontinuing his studies and is head over heals in love with a village girl Radha (Sudha Rani).

== Cast ==
- Vinod Raj as Krishna
- Sudha Rani as Radha
- Hema Choudhary
- C. R. Simha
- Nachiketha
- Jaggesh
- Priya
- Keerthiraj
- Sathyabhama
- Chethan Ramarao

== Production ==
The first shot was filmed at St. Mary's Islands. During a dance sequence, Sudha Rani was injured, and the sequence was shot with a different actress and the movie team proceeded to shoot at Thirthahalli where Vinod Raj fell ill and Dwarakish received a telegram that said to stop making the film. For the two month period that Vinod Raj and Sudha Rani were recovering, Dwarakish went on to work on a different film, Ganda Mane Makkalu.

== Soundtrack ==
All the songs are composed and scored by Vijayanand. The songs were appreciated upon release.

Sl No	Song title	Singer(s)	Lyricist
1	"Aaduvenu Nimagagi"	S. P. Balasubrahmanyam	Chi. Udaya Shankar
2	"Minchante Bande"	S. P. Balasubrahmanyam	R. N. Jayagopal
3	"Praya Bandare Yaako"	S. P. Balasubrahmanyam, K. S. Chithra	Hamsalekha
4	"Dhama Dhamaru"	S. P. Balasubrahmanyam, K. S. Chithra	R. N. Jayagopal
5	"Ee Kaalu Nondu"	S. P. Balasubrahmanyam	R. N. Jayagopal
6	"Dhim Thana"	S. P. Balasubrahmanyam	R. N. Jayagopal
7	"Ee Radhe Jeeva"	K. S. Chithra	R. N. Jayagopal

== Release ==
The film was a failure at the box office similar to other Dwarakish productions at the time.

== Awards ==
- 1988-89 - Karnataka State Film Award for Best Editor - Gowthama Raju
