= Srigandha =

- Directed by: P. H. Vishwanath
- Screenplay by: P. H. Vishwanath
- Story by: P. H. Vishwanath; Neernalli Raju
- Produced by: R. Sampath Kumar
- Starring: Ramesh Aravind; Sudha Rani
- Cinematography: B. N. Haridas
- Edited by: Suresh Urs
- Music by: Hamsalekha
- Production company: Sri Varaha Creations
- Release date: 1995
- Running time: 152 minutes
- Country: India
- Language: Kannada

Srigandha (transl. Sandalwood) is a 1995 Indian Kannada-language romance drama film co-written and directed by P. H. Vishwanath. It stars Ramesh Aravind and Sudha Rani in the lead roles as Vivek and Arundathi, who plan to marry each other, but their families disapprove of it. Srinath, Sushma, B. V. Radha and Sanketh Kashi feature in supporting roles. The film was remade in Telugu as Arundathi (1999).

== Cast ==
- Ramesh Aravind as Vivek
- Sudha Rani as Arundathi
- Srinath as Seetharam
- Sushma
- B. V. Radha
- Sanketh Kashi as Mudda

== Soundtrack ==
Srigandha

Soundtrack album by Hamsalekha
- Genre: Feature film soundtrack
- Length: 24:19
- Label: Akash Audio

Hamsalekha scored music for the film's background and its soundtrack. The soundtrack album consists of five tracks.

Track listing
No.	Title	Singer(s)	Length
1.	"Kayisuva Hudugiyara"	Mano, S. Janaki	5:03
2.	"Kogilepada Janapada"	Mano, S. Janaki	4:27
3.	"O Andhramma Andharu"	P. B. Sreenivas, S. Janaki, B. R. Chaya	5:12
4.	"Ondu Aparoopada"	S. P. Balasubrahmanyam, Manjula Gururaj	5:05
5.	"Sister Sister"	Latha Hamsalekha, Vijayalakshmi	4:32
Total length:			24:19
