= Ranaranga =

1988 Indian Kannada-language action film

- Poster
- Directed by: V. Somashekhar
- Written by: Hamsalekha (Dialogues)
- Screenplay by: V. Somasekhar
- Story by: N. T. Jayarama Reddy
- Produced by: Parvathamma Rajkumar
- Starring: Shiva Rajkumar; Sudharani; Tara
- Cinematography: H. G. Raju
- Edited by: P. Bhaktavatsalam
- Music by: Hamsalekha
- Production company: Vaishnavi Movies
- Release date: 24 November 1988
- Running time: 143 minutes
- Country: India
- Language: Kannada

Ranaranga (transl. Battlefield) is a 1988 Indian Kannada-language action film directed by V. Somashekhar and written by N. T. Jayarama Reddy. The film stars Shiva Rajkumar, Sudharani and Tara. Produced by Shivarajkumar's mother, Parvathamma Rajkumar under the banner of Vaishnavi Movies, the film's musical score was by Hamsalekha making this his first collaboration with Shivarajkumar of the several future successful films.

This is Shiva Rajkumar's first action movie and the only movie in which V. Somashekhar directed him. Dr. Rajkumar sung a background song for his son which is considered as one of his favourite songs.

== Plot ==
After serving 12 years in a juvenile home, Anand goes to meet his grandfather, Shanthamurthy who has gone to attend a felicitation ceremony. While travelling to the place, Anand witnesses a young girl jump to death in order to protect herself from a gang of four savages. While chasing them, he finds his terribly injured grandfather, who was thrashed by them while trying to save that girl. He takes his grandfather to the nearby nursing home where the doctor refuses to treat him since it is a criminal case and instead asks him to consult a government hospital. With no time to spare, he requests the doctor to drop them there. When the latter refuses, Anand forcefully takes the car's key from him. After admitting his grandfather, he travels to the nearby blood bank. En route to the hospital, he is intercepted by police officers, who arrest Anand for stealing the car only for him to hold the Inspector at point blank where he forces him to take him to the hospital to hand over the bottles containing the required blood. He is then arrested and subsequently produced to the court, where he convinces the judge of his predicament and gets freed.

Anand meets Ramnath, a lawyer, who offers him a lift to the hospital. Upon reaching the hospital, he learns that his grandfather has died and performs the last rites. A dejected Anand is taken under his wing by Ramnath, who offers to help him practice law. Anand is taken to his house where he meets Ramnath's only daughter Bhavana, who happens to have an erratic behaviour. Meanwhile, The gang of savages target Shashikala, a young girl who works as a receptionist at a 5 star hotel, since she had rejected their advances. She is saved by Anand who also takes them to the police station. Upon accompanying Shashi to her home, he finds that Shashi is his cousin and reveals the situations that made him a killer to his aunt Kamala. After his father Ranganna, a lorry driver was killed by his Contractor boss Nagaraj and the latter's friends: Basappa, Chandrappa and Mahadevappa to sleep with Anand's mother Saraswati, Driven by vengeance, A 10 year old Anand breaks into Nagaraj's house and stabs him to death. He reveals how he wishes to reunite with his mother and sister about whom only his late grandfather had known about their whereabouts.

Meanwhile, Anand learns that the savages using their influence have freed themselves. He also learns that they are the sons of Nagaraj and his friends, who murdered his father and they had molested Bhavana in the past. He is shocked to know that Nagaraj is still alive and tries to kill him. But is stopped by his daughter Aasha. Nagaraj and his partners tries to kill Anand, but to no avail. One day, after returning from temple Anand meets his mother who gets hit by Aasha's car and from her learns that his infant sister, Usha was killed by Nagraj to transplant her eyes to the blind Aasha. Aasha is disgusted by her father's crimes and seeks forgiveness. Saraswati feels that she has got Usha through Aasha. Anand, who is stopped from slaying his enemies by his mother, Shashi and Aasha gives them an ultimatum to surrender to the police and confess their crimes. When they spurn his statement, Anand abducts their children. In return, Nagaraj and others kidnap Saraswati, Kamala and Shashi and orders for an exchange of hostages at Devaragudda. However, Bhavana finds the location of the savages and tries to kill them. Anand refrains Bhavana from killing them and they take them to Devaragudda. The children reaches the safe zone. Anand and his family are attacked. Anand manages to defeat them and Bhavana kills the savages, thereby getting her revenge. Mahadevayya and Basappa are killed while Chandrappa and Nagraj are arrested by the police summoned by Ramnath. They apologise to Anand and mentions how bad upbringing had caused their children to become such obnoxious brutes and face such tragic deaths. Anand reunites with his family.

== Cast ==
- Shiva Rajkumar as Anand
- Sudharani as Shashikala
- Master Manjunath as Young Anand
- Tara as Bhavana
- C. R. Simha as Lawyer Ramnath, Bhavana's father
- Balakrishna as Freedom Fighter Shanthamurthy, Anand's grandfather
- Thoogudeepa Srinivas as Contractor "Khota Note" Nagaraj
- Dheerendra Gopal as Baddi Basappa
- Sathyajith as Chandrappa
- Sundar Krishna Urs as Mahadevayya
- Jaggesh as Jaggu
- Rathasapthami Aravind as Prakash
- Shankar Patil
- Tumkur Mohan
- Arasikere Raju
- Akhila Thandur
- Sangeetha
- Ramachandra Kodange
- M. S. Karanth

== Soundtrack ==
The music of the film was composed and lyrics were written by Hamsalekha. The soundtrack album comprises 7 tracks. Actor Rajkumar recorded the song "Jagave Ondu Ranaranga". Shivarajkumar debuted as a playback singer with the song "O Meghave". The song "O Meghave" was used by Hamsalekha in the same year (1988) for the Tamil movie Kodi Parakkuthu as "Oh Kadhal Ennai" which also used the tune of another song in between ("Mussanjeli Nammuralli").

Ranaranga

Soundtrack album by Hamsalekha
- Released: 31 August 1988
- Genre: Feature film soundtrack
- Language: Kannada
- Label: Lahari Music

No.	Title	Lyrics	Singer(s)	Length
1.	"Ninna Kannugalu"	Hamsalekha	S. P. Balasubrahmanyam, Vani Jairam
2.	"O Meghave"	Hamsalekha	Shivarajkumar, Joo Joo Anuradha
3.	"Iva Yaava Seeme"	Hamsalekha	S. P. Balasubrahmanyam, Vani Jairam
4.	"Mussanjeli Nammuralli"	Hamsalekha	Manjula Gururaj
5.	"Meribedavo Shakuni Manuja"	Hamsalekha	S. P. Balasubrahmanyam
6.	"Muddu Muddu"	Hamsalekha	Manjula Gururaj
7.	"Jagave Ondu Ranaranga"	Hamsalekha	Dr. Rajkumar
