= Ghauttham =

- Poster
- Directed by: K. Rajeev Prasad
- Story by: Suresh Krissna
- Based on: Aahaa..! (Tamil)(1997)
- Produced by: Malini Subramanyam
- Starring: Prem; Sarah; Anant Nag
- Cinematography: S. R. Sudhakar
- Edited by: B. S. Ramesh
- Music by: Gurukiran
- Production company: Synergy Images
- Release date: April 3, 2009
- Running time: 147 minutes
- Country: India
- Language: Kannada

Ghauttham is a 2009 Kannada romance film directed by K. Rajeev Prasad and starring Prem and Sarah in the lead roles with Kokila Mohan, Sudharani and Ananth Nag in other pivotal roles.

The film is a remake of the Tamil film Aahaa..! (1997) directed by Suresh Krissna.

== Cast ==
- Prem as Gowtham
- Sarah as Janaki
- Kokila Mohan as Raghuram
- Kausalya as Geetha
- Ananth Nag
- Sudharani
- Vinaya Prakash
- Ramesh Bhat as Janaki's father
- Mandeep Roy
- Shivaram
- Bindushree
- Bank Janardhan

== Soundtrack ==
The film's score and soundtrack was composed by Gurukiran.

All lyrics are written by Kaviraj, V. Manohar and Hrudaya Shiva.

Track listing
No.	Title	Singer(s)	Length
1.	"Yaara Magalu Ivalu"	Gurukiran, Lakshmi Nagaraj
2.	"Shuruvagide Olage"	Suresh Wadkar
3.	"Rangavittala"	Aniruddh, Chaitra H. G.
4.	"Ammo Ammo"	Gurukiran, Chaitra H. G.
5.	"Kabul Drakshi"	Karthik, Anuradha Sriram

== Critical reception ==
R. G. Vijayasarathy of Rediff.com scored the film at 2.5 out of 5 stars, lauding the various cast performances and said, "Despite its dragging moments and predictable story line, Gauththam is a neat family entertainer". A critic from Sify wrote "Gurukiran is good in three tunes for the film and the other beauty of the film is the camera work by Sudhakar. Every frame of the film is gleeful. This is an above average film". A critic from The Times of India rated the film 3.5 out of 5 stars and wrote, "Debutant director K Rajiv Prasad has selected a good family story with a fresh script, excellent narration and good command over sequences. The story is close to the heart and moves fast without a dull moment, keeping everyone guessing".
