= Swathi (1994 film) =

- Directed by: Shivamani
- Written by: Shivamani
- Produced by: S. Shailendra Babu
- Starring: Sudharani; Shashikumar; Vajramuni; B. V. Radha
- Cinematography: P. K. H. Das
- Edited by: Suresh Urs
- Music by: M. M. Keeravani
- Production company: Shruthi Enterprises
- Release date: 18 January 1994
- Running time: 149 minutes
- Country: India
- Language: Kannada

Swathi is a 1994 Indian Kannada-language romantic drama film, directed by Shivamani and produced by S. Shailendra Babu. The film stars Sudharani and Shashikumar, while Vajramuni, Avinash and Umashree played key supporting roles. The film's music was scored by M. M. Keeravani, whilst the cinematography was by P. K. H. Das.

== Cast ==
- Sudharani as Swathi
- Shashikumar
- Umashree
- Vajramuni
- B. V. Radha
- Sundar Krishna Urs
- Bank Janardhan
- Avinash
- Padma Vasanthi
- Shivaram
- Tennis Krishna
- Rekha Das
- Shobhraj

== Soundtrack ==
The music of the film was composed by M. M. Keeravani. After release, the soundtrack was well received and all the songs became very popular. Audio was released on Akash Audio.

Track listing
No.	Title	Lyrics	Singer(s)	Length
1.	"Kuhu Kuhu Haaduva"	R. N. Jayagopal	K. S. Chithra
2.	"Parade Yetthi Panneera Chelli"	Sriranga	S. P. Balasubrahmanyam, K. S. Chithra
3.	"Panjarada O Giliye"	R. N. Jayagopal	S. P. Balasubrahmanyam, K. S. Chithra
4.	"Suriva Maleyali"	Shyamsundar Kulkarni	S. P. Balasubrahmanyam, K. S. Chithra
5.	"Panjarada O Giniye"	R. N. Jayagopal	K. S. Chithra
