= Thumbida Mane =

- Poster
- Directed by: S. Umesh
- Written by: K. Prabhakar
- Produced by: K. Prabhakar
- Starring: Vishnuvardhan; Shashikumar; Vinaya Prasad; Shruti; Tara; Abhijeeth
- Cinematography: H. G. Raju
- Edited by: S. Umesh
- Music by: Upendra Kumar
- Production company: Vijay Films
- Release date: 2 May 1995
- Running time: 147 minutes
- Country: India
- Language: Kannada

Thumbida Mane is a 1995 Indian Kannada-language romantic action film directed by S. Umesh and written & produced by K. Prabhakar. The film stars an ensemble star cast including Vishnuvardhan, Shashikumar, Shruti, Vinaya Prasad and Tara, besides a host of supporting actors. The music for the film was scored by Upendra Kumar and the audio was bought by Lahari Music.

== Cast ==
- Vishnuvardhan as Ramanna
- Vinaya Prasad as Seetha
- Shashikumar as Krishna
- Shruti as Kaveri
- Tara as Geetha
- Ashok as Bhaira
- Pramila Joshai as Kempi Bhaira wife
- Shivakumar
- Anjali Sudhakar as Sundri
- Lokanath as Nettkkall Shivajja
- Umashri as Gangavva
- C. R. Simha as Lawyer Lakshmayya
- Abhijith as Lokesha
- Usha as Rosy
- Dheerendra Gopal as Nagappa
- Girija Lokesh as Bhagya, Kaveri mother
- Ashalatha as Bhemanhalli Mallavva
- KV Manjayya as Kempi father
- Lohithashwa

== Soundtrack ==
The music of the film was composed by Upendra Kumar. All the lyrics were written by M. D. Hashim

Thumbida Mane

Soundtrack album by Upendra Kumar
- Released: 1995
- Genre: Feature film soundtrack
- Label: Lahari Music

No.	Title	Singer(s)	Length
1.	"Kaveri Sirigannada"	S. P. Balasubrahmanyam
2.	"Hatthira Hatthira"	S. P. Balasubrahmanyam, Manjula Gururaj
3.	"Jeevakke Jeeva"	S. P. Balasubrahmanyam, Sangeetha Katti
4.	"Sri Ramachandrana"	K. S. Chithra
5.	"Phalisithu Premada"	S. P. Balasubrahmanyam, Manjula Gururaj
6.	"Kaveri Sirigannadamma"	Sangeetha Katti
