= Kavya (film) =

- Directed by: Kodlu Ramakrishna
- Written by: Vijaya Thandavamurthy; Kodlu Ramakrishna
- Produced by: Vaidehi Venkataram; Mangalagowri; Kodlu Ramakrishna
- Starring: Ramkumar; Sithara; Sudharani; Kalyan Kumar
- Cinematography: B. S. Basavaraj
- Edited by: B. S. Kemparaj
- Music by: Sadhu Kokila
- Production company: Spandana Films
- Release date: 1995
- Running time: 147 minutes
- Country: India
- Language: Kannada

Kavya is a 1995 Indian Kannada-language romantic drama film directed and co-produced by Kodlu Ramakrishna and based on the novel written by Vijaya Thandavamurthy and Ramakrishna himself. The film cast includes Ramkumar, Sudharani and Sithara with Sudharani playing the title role. The film was produced under Spandana Films banner and the original score and soundtrack were composed by Sadhu Kokila.

== Cast ==
- Ramkumar as Dr. Prasad
- Sudharani as Dr. Kavya
- Sithara as Kalpana
- Kalyan Kumar as Rajaram
- Goruru Venkataram
- Kumari Sheela Goruru
- Ramakrishna as Dr. Ananth
- Chandrashekar
- Shailesh
- Girija Lokesh as Prasad's mother
- Jaishree Sridhar
- Rama Jyothi
- Rama Sundar
- Balamathi
- Dr Chandravathi
- Ramachandra

== Soundtrack ==
The music of the film was composed by Sadhu Kokila and lyrics written by Prof. Doddarange Gowda and Geethapriya. It also has a couplet written by poet Kuvempu. The soundtrack also features one song sung by actor Rajkumar.

Prof. Doddarange Gowda was awarded with the Karnataka State Film Award for Best Lyricist for the year 1995-96 for the song "Vandane Vandane" written by him.

Kavya

Soundtrack album by Sadhu Kokila
- Released: 1995
- Genre: Feature film soundtrack
- Label: Akash Audio

No.	Title	Lyrics	Singer(s)	Length
1.	"Vandane Vandane"	Prof. Doddarange Gowda	S. P. Balasubrahmanyam
2.	"Ettha Thirugali Kannu"	Kuvempu	K. S. Chithra
3.	"Olumeya Kavya"	Prof. Doddarange Gowda	Rajesh Krishnan, K. S. Chithra
4.	"Nee Midida Madhura"	Devappa	S. P. Balasubrahmanyam, Manjula Gururaj
5.	"Aasegala Lokadali"	Geethapriya	Rajkumar

== External source ==
- Kavya at IMDb
