= Kona Edaithe =

Kona Eedaithe
- VCD cover
- Directed by: B. Jayashree Devi
- Written by: Abhaya Katha Vibhaga
- Produced by: J. K. Bharavi
- Starring: Vishnuvardhan; Kumar Govind; Sudharani; Vinaya Prasad
- Cinematography: H. G. Raju
- Edited by: S. Prasad
- Music by: Hamsalekha
- Production company: Vennela International Films
- Release date: 10 February 1995
- Running time: 109 minutes
- Country: India
- Language: Kannada

Kona Eedaithe is a 1995 Indian Kannada-language legal comedy drama film directed by B. Jayashree Devi and produced by J. K. Bharavi. The story is adapted from Abhaya Katha Vibhaga movie company. The film starred Vishnuvardhan, Kumar Govind, Vinaya Prasad and Vanitha Vasu while Sudharani made a guest appearance. The film's music is scored by Hamsalekha whilst the cinematography is by H. G. Raju.

== Cast ==
- Vishnuvardhan as Advocate Vishnu
- Kumar Govind as Krishna and Gaya Ramayya
- Sudharani as Vishnu's wife (guest appearance)
- Vinaya Prasad as Nyaya Devathe
- Vanitha Vasu
- Anjali
- Umashree
- C. R. Simha
- Mukhyamantri Chandru as Judge
- Ramesh Bhat
- Sihi Kahi Chandru
- Doddanna
- Shivaram
- Lohithaswa
- Bank Janardhan
- Sarigama Viji
- Dingri Nagaraj
- Bangalore Nagesh
- Ashalatha as Anyaya Devathe
- Kunigal Vasanth
- Ashok Badaradinni

== Soundtrack ==
The music of the film was composed and lyrics written by Hamsalekha. After release, the soundtrack was well received and the song "Aaha Namma Konake Seemantha" became very popular. Audio was released on Jhankar Music label.

Track listing
| No. | Title | Lyrics | Singer(s) | Length |
|---|---|---|---|---|
| 1. | "Baa Seeti Hodi" | Hamsalekha | K. S. Chithra |
| 2. | "Jackie Chan" | Hamsalekha | S. Janaki, Rajesh Krishnan |
| 3. | "Oh Love" | Hamsalekha | Rajesh Krishnan, K. S. Chithra |
| 4. | "Gattina Nindu Heartu" | Hamsalekha | S. P. Balasubrahmanyam |
| 5. | "Aaha Namma Konake Seemantha" | Hamsalekha | C. Ashwath, Rajesh Krishnan |
| 6. | "Baa Seeti Hodi" | Hamsalekha | S. P. Balasubrahmanyam |
