= Sundar Krishna Urs =

Indian actor, producer, and director (1941–1993)

- Born: 1 January 1941; Kingdom of Mysore
- Died: 8 November 1993 (aged 52)
- Occupations: Film actor; producer; director
- Spouse: Lakshmi
- Family: Suresh Urs (brother)

Sundar Krishna Urs (1941–1993) was an Indian film producer and actor, in the Kannada film industry, as well as in many South Indian language films known for his negative roles. He has also worked as a dubbing artist providing voices to many actors. Some of the notable films of Sundar Krishna Urs as an actor include Sangya Balya (1992), Hrudaya Haadithu (1991), Hendthighelbedi (1989), Antha (1981).

== Career ==
Urs appeared in more than 190 films in Kannada. He also directed a teen adventure film called Supernova 459, which also happens to be his last acting credit before his death. He died from typhoid after he completed filming for Swathi (1994), aged 52.

== Selected filmography ==
- All films are in Kannada unless otherwise noted.

Year	Title	Role	Notes	Ref.
1973	Sankalpa			
1976	Mugiyada Kathe			
1977	Nagarahole	Mahim		
1978	Ondanondu Kaladalli	Peramadi	Karnataka State Film Award for Best Supporting Actor	
1978	Aparichita	Mohan		
1979	Seetharamu			
1979	Putani Agent 123			
1979	Naniruvude Ninagagi	Shyamsunder		
1980	Kappu Kola	Dr. Sambu		
1980	Kulla Kulli	Parasuraj		
1980	Auto Raja	Sudhakar		
1980	Moogana Sedu	Narsing		
1980	Rusthum Jodi	Sundar		
1980	Nyaya Neethi Dharma	M. J. Peter		
1980	Point Parimala	Sarathi		
1980	Janma Janmada Anubandha	Landlord		
1980	Haddina Kannu	Prathap		
1981	Etu Eduretu	Ugrayya		
1981	Antha	Beg		
1981	Guru Shishyaru	Leader of robber gang		
1982	Khadeema Kallaru			
1982	Benki Chendu	Lankapathi		
1982	Nyaya Ellide	Jagannath		
1982	Prema Matsara	Dr. Jairaj		
1982	Ajith	Vinod		
1982	Tony	Rajendra		
1983	Aasha			
1983	Geluvu Nannade	Prof. Shankar		
1983	Ibbani Karagithu	Samarth		
1983	Dharma Yuddha			
1983	Banker Margayya	Dr. Pal		
1983	Gedda Maga	Basappa		
1984	Huli Hejje	Ranganath		
1984	Gandu Bherunda	Babu		
1984	Runamukthalu	Ramappa		
1986	Aruna Raaga	Devobhava		
1986	Agni Parikshe	Dr. Mohan		
1986	Punnagai Mannan	Malini's father	Tamil film	
1986	Preethi	Raja Rao		
1987	Huli Hebbuli	Ramanna, Vijay and Ajay's father		
1987	Athiratha Maharatha	Chandrashekhar		
1987	Digvijaya	Judge		
1988	Samyuktha	Mohan Rao		
1988	Mathru Vathsalya	Sadanand		
1988	Ranaranga	Mahadevayya		
1989	Nanjundi Kalyana	Devi's father		
1989	Inspector Vikram	Krishnamurthy		
1990	Mruthyunjaya	Lakshmipathi		
1990	Udbhava			
1990	Chapala Chennigaraya	Madan Gopal's father		
1991	Hrudaya Haadithu	Raja Rao		
1992	Saptapadi	Ramamurthy		
1992	Bharjari Gandu			
1993	Sangharsha			
1993	Jwala	Jagadish Rao		
1994	Keralida Sarpa		Posthumous release	
1994	Swathi		Posthumous release	
1994	Sididedda Pandavaru		Posthumous release	
1994	Chinna		Posthumous release	
1994	Apoorva Samsara		Posthumous release	
1995	Mr. Vasu	Sripathi Rao	Posthumous release	
1995	Thungabhadra		Posthumous release	
1995	Chinnada Raja		Posthumous release	

== See also ==
- List of people from Karnataka
- List of Indian film actors
