= Mahakshathriya =

Mahakshatriya
- Directed by: Rajendra Singh Babu
- Written by: Shantharam – ಡಾ. ಬ ಲ ಸುರೇಶ [Dialogues]
- Screenplay by: S. V. Rajendra singh babu
- Story by: Madhu Sinha
- Produced by: G. Manohar naidu & brothers
- Starring: Vishnuvardhan; Sonu Walia; Ramkumar; Sudha Rani; Shankar Ashwath; B. C. Patil
- Cinematography: D. V. Rajaram
- Edited by: Suresh Urs
- Music by: Hamsalekha
- Production company: Lahari Recording Company
- Distributed by: R. F. Productions
- Release date: 27 May 1994
- Running time: 2 hours 18 minutes
- Country: India
- Language: Kannada

Mahakshatriya (transl. Great Warrior) is a 1994 Indian Kannada-language action-drama film directed by Rajendra Singh Babu, starring Vishnuvardhan, Sonu Walia, Ramkumar, Sudha Rani and B. C. Patil. Rajendra Singh Babu won Best Director Filmfare award.

== Plot ==
The story revolves around a young man who is short-tempered but good at heart who is sent to prison for committing a murder which was actually accidental and the victim was his cousin. He has a lot of guilt built inside him for not being able to control his anger and manage his anger issues that cost him the life of his close cousin.The prison officer helps him in controlling and managing his anger. He finally overcomes his anger issues but on the other hand there are few of the youngsters who are misled in turn becoming drug addicts and also have involved themselves in the crime world. So seeing them he decides to transform them the same way he himself got transformed. He finds out that there are many more people few of them who are politicians too behind The misled youngsters.The rest of the story revolves around how the protagonist transforms the misled youngsters in order to avoid the adverse effects upon the society.

== Cast ==
- Vishnuvardhan as Prathap
- Sonu Walia as Kaveri
- Ramkumar as Siddharth
- Sudha Rani as Priyadarshini and Lakshmi
- B. C. Patil
- Rahul Dev
- Shankar Ashwath
- Sushma Veer
- Sadashiva Brahmavar
- M. V. Vasudev rao
- Kunigal Nagabhushan
- Shankar Patil
- Gururaj Hosakote

== Production ==
This was the last collaboration between Rajendra Singh Babu and Vishnuvardhan. It was the first film to be produced by Lahari Audio company. The song "Ee Bhoomi Bannada Buguri" was shot by the director himself without any choreographer. The producer's son made an appearance in the song playing a flute.

== Soundtrack ==
Soundtrack was composed by Hamsalekha. This film is well known for the hugely popular philosophical song "Ee Bhoomi Bannada Buguri", sung by S. P. Balasubrahmanyam. This song was included in Kannada school textbooks.

- "Ee Bhoomi Bannada Buguri" – S. P. Balasubrahmanyam
- "Tavare Kendavare" – K. S. Chithra, S. P. Balasubrahmanyam
- "Yenaithi Olage Yenaithi" – Malgudi Subha, Gururaj Hosakote
- "Chumbana Chumbana" – K. S. Chitra
- "O Prema O Prema" – K. S. Chitra, S. P. Balasubrahmanyam
