= Yarigu Helbedi =

- Title card
- Directed by: Kodlu Ramakrishna
- Screenplay by: Kodlu Ramakrishna
- Story by: Geetha Rao
- Produced by: Asha Gunashekhar; J. Padmalatha
- Starring: Anant Nag; Vinaya Prasad; Vanitha Vasu
- Cinematography: S. Ramachandra
- Edited by: Suresh Urs
- Music by: Rajan–Nagendra
- Production company: Sri Banashankari Combines
- Release date: 1994
- Running time: 139 minutes
- Country: India
- Language: Kannada

Yarigu Helbedi (transl. Don't Tell Anyone) is a 1994 Kannada language comedy-drama film directed by Kodlu Ramakrishna. It stars Anant Nag, Vinaya Prasad, Mukhyamantri Chandru and Vaishali Kasaravalli among others. The film turned out to be a box-office bomb at the time of release but later attained a cult following among Kannada film viewers. The movie was remade in Tulu in 2015 by the same director as Eregla Panodchi.

== Plot ==
Govinda (Anant Nag) is a con artist who is always on the lookout for gullible people to extract money or some form of benefit from. Govinda is in love with Champa (Vanitha Vasu) whom he intends to marry much to the dissatisfaction of Champa's father (Shivaram) who considers Govinda as a no good fellow loafing around without a job.

Sarojamma (Vinaya Prasad), Subbamma (Satyabhama), Jalajamma (Vaishali Kasaravalli) and Susheelamma (Girija Lokesh) are very close friends and neighbours who live in the same housing complex owned by Obaliah (Mukhyamantri Chandru). Jalajamma's husband lives and works in Dubai and visits her once in a year. The ladies always get together in the common place in the housing complex and share details about their lives and gossip. Sarojamma's husband Ramaraya (Lokesh), Susheelamma's husband Doddanna (Doddanna), Subbamma's husband Piteelu (Kunigal Nagabhushan) are close friends who usually get together in a bar, drink and share their troubles in their lives. Sheela (Tara) also lives in the same apartment complex, but is always taunted by the other ladies as she is a widow. She lives with her young daughter. The neighbours even make up stories that she is a woman of bad character and has relationships with other men while this is absolutely untrue. They suspect Naveen (Ramakrishna) to be Sheela's lover, but he happens to be a decent gentleman and a good friend to Sheela.

The wives always dream of owning a home, but their husband's never approve of this, citing insufficient funds or high interest rate on loans. Govinda takes advantage of this desperation and contacts the wives while their husband's are at work. He promises the ladies that if they keep this a secret and can arrange some money he will get them housing plots allotted. The wives fall victim to the scam and end up selling their jewellery, some sink into their life long savings and give all the money to Govinda. Meanwhile, Govinda uses this money to buy himself a plot of land and starts constructing a house.

One day, Ramaraya who happens to be passing by notices that Govinda is supervising housing construction and inquiries about the same. Govinda tells him that he is getting married and wants to have a home before that. Ramaraya volunteers to oversee the construction and provide insights to better the home to which Govinda agrees.

The husband's eventually come to know that their wives have been deceived by Govinda and all the money is gone. Sheela attempts suicide but survives. Naveen proposes to her and she agrees to marry him. On the day of Govinda's house warming ceremony, all the husband and wives go and confront Govinda. Govinda tries playing around but he is completely trapped when the husbands reveal that they know everything. Ramaraya reveals that the reason why he volunteered to oversee Govinda's house construction and was so helpful was because he was completely aware that Govinda, by mistake, is constructing a house on the plot which Ramaraya has secretly purchased without his wife's knowledge. Co-incidentally it was the same plot which Govinda mistook for his plot and constructed the house.

Now Govinda is trapped because as per the contractual documents, the plot belongs to Ramaraya and the constructed house too. Govinda in the end makes amends and apologises. He is quickly forgiven and warned not to cheat in the future and to live an honest life.

== Cast ==
- Anant Nag as Govinda
- Lokesh as Ramaraya
- Vinaya Prasad as Saroja
- Vanitha Vasu as Champa
- Tara as Sheela
- Ramakrishna as Naveen (Guest Appearance)
- Mukhyamantri Chandru as Obaliah
- Shivaram as Champa's father
- Vaishali Kasaravalli as Jalaja
- Girija Lokesh as Susheela
- Doddanna as Doddanna
- Satyabhama as Subbu
- Kunigal Nagabhushan as Piteelu
- Bangalore Nagesh
