= Samara (1995 film) =

- Theatrical release poster
- Directed by: Chi. Guru Dutt
- Written by: J. Damodaran
- Story by: J. Damodaran
- Produced by: Praveen A. Gurjer; Varun A Gurjer; Anil Pagdi
- Starring: Shiva Rajkumar; Sudharani; Devaraj
- Cinematography: R. Madhusudhan
- Edited by: P. Bhaktavatsalam
- Music by: Kausthubha; Sax Raja (background score)
- Production company: A A Combines
- Release date: 18 August 1995
- Running time: 149 minutes
- Country: India
- Language: Kannada

Samara (transl. War) is a 1995 Indian Kannada-language action film directed by Chi Guru Dutt in his directorial debut assisted by P. Sheshadri. The film stars Shiva Rajkumar, Sudharani, Malavika and Devaraj.

== Cast ==
- Shiva Rajkumar as Uday
- Sudharani as Usha
- Devaraj as Ravi
- Jai Jagadish
- Srinivasa Murthy
- Malavika as Sandhya
- Chi. Guru Dutt
- Ashok Rao
- Ajay Gundurao as Shankar
- Tej Sapru as J. D
- Nandini Singh
- Rathasapthami Aravind
- Satish
- Shobhraj
- Harish Rai
- Bharath kumar
- Bank Suresh
- Stunt Siddu

== Soundtrack ==
The soundtrack of the film was composed by Kousthubha and the background score was by Sax Raja.

Track listing
No.	Title	Singer(s)	Length
1.	"Mai Marethu"	S. P. Balasubrahmanyam, K. S. Chithra
2.	"Aa Aaa Ee Eee"	S. P. Balasubrahmanyam, K. S. Chithra
3.	"Kanasinalu Neene"	S. P. Balasubrahmanyam, K. S. Chithra
4.	"Ide Dim Dima"	Manjula Gururaj
5.	"Kannadada Maathu Chenda"	Rajkumar
