= Kumbar Veerabhadrappa =

Indian Kannada writer and critic (born 1953)

Veerabhadrappa Kumbar
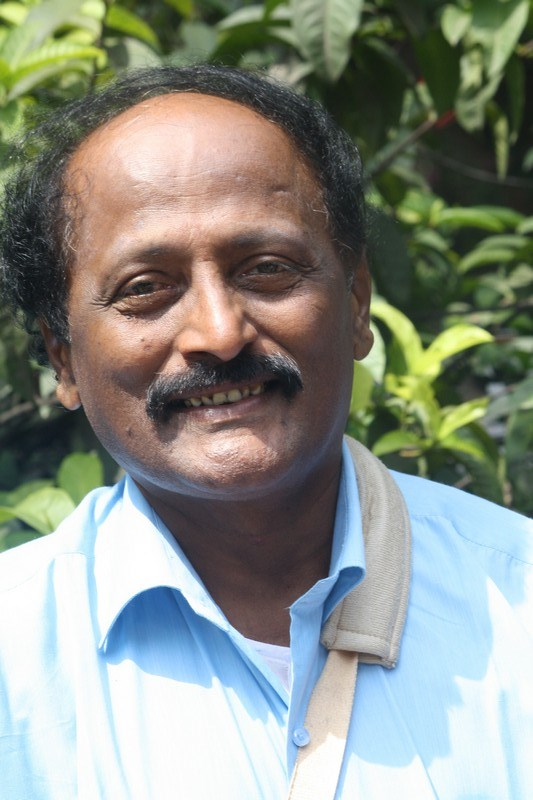
- Born: 1 October 1953 (age 73); Kotturu, Mysore State, India
- Education: M.A
- Occupations: Teacher, novelist, poet, critic
- Spouse: Annapoorna
- Children: 3
- Writing career
- Pen name: KumVee
- Language: Kannada
- Genres: Fiction, poetry, drama, essays
- Notable work: Aramane
- Notable awards: Sahitya Akademi Award; 2007

Veerabhadrappa Kumbar (born 1 October 1953), popularly known by the pen name KumVee, is an Indian novelist, poet, story writer and critic in the Kannada language. He was awarded the Sahitya Akademi Award in 2007 for his work Aramane.

== Early life ==
KumVee was born on 1 October 1953 in Kotturu, a town in the Bellary District of Karnataka, to Kumbar Halappa and Kotramma. KumVee's family includes his wife Annapoorna, and three sons: Purarava (the eldest), Shalivahana, and Pravara (the youngest).

== Career ==
KumVee taught Kannada in many schools for 35 years in the neighboring state of Andhra Pradesh. After retirement, he moved back to his native Kotturu with his family.

== Writing style ==
He uses the local Ballary dialect of Kannada in his writings to convey the sensitivities of the life he has experienced. This is the main strength of KumVee's writing.

== Books ==
=== Collection of poems ===
- Divi seemeya Haadu
- Rajanaramanege Kavya

=== Story/ collection of stories ===
- Raayalaseema
- Nigi Nigi Hagalu
- Manne Modalu
- Koole
- Koormavathara
- Doma Mattitara Kathegalu
- Bhaalare Vichitram
- Inaadaroo Saayabeku
- Kumvee Ayda Kathegalu
- Bhagavathi Kaadu
- Karivemala
- Apoorva Chintamani Kathe
- Sushile Emba Naayiyoi Vaagili Emba Graamavoo
- Enter the Dragon
- KumVee Bareda Kathegalu
- Idu Bari Katheyallo Anna
- Kum Vee 70 Kathe 50

=== Novels ===
- Hemareddy mallammana Katheyu
- Ekaambara
- Kappu
- Beli mattu Hola
- Aasthi
- Kotra Highschoolige Seriddu
- Yaapillu
- Shyamanna
- Kendada Male
- Bete
- Pakshigalu
- Pratidwandi
- Hanuma
- Aramane
- Beliya Hoogalu
- Aarohana
- Nijalinga
- Kattegondu Kaala
- Kilubu
- Shwaanaavalambanakari
- Ello Jogappa Ninnaramane
- Encounter
- Jai Bhajarangabali

=== Biographies ===
- Chaplin
- Rahula saakrutsayana
- Neetaji Subhasha Chandra Bose
- Subhadramma mansur
- Sri Krishna Devaraya

=== Autobiography ===
- Gandhi Classu

=== Translation ===
- Chinnda tene
- Telugu Kathegalu
- Ondu Peeligeya Telugu Kathegalu
- Tanna maarga ( Stories of Dr Abburi Chayadevi)

All the above four translations have been published by "Sahitya Akademi, New Delhi". In addition to this, KumVee has translated more than 300 stories from many languages.

=== Edits ===
- Kathegalu-1989

== Work in visual media ==
- Manamechhida Hudugi
- Dore
- Kotreshi Kanasu
- Kendada Male
- Koormavatara
- Bhagavati Kaadu
- Beli mattu Hola

== Noted awards ==
- Rajyotsava Prashasti
- Honorary Doctorate from Karnataka University of Dharwad
- Sahitya Akademi Award (2007) - Returned in October 2015 on protest for intolerance in India.
- Nrupatunga Award
- Karnataka Sahitya Academy Award Awarded Thrice.
- Nadoja Award
