= Sudha Rani =

Indian actress

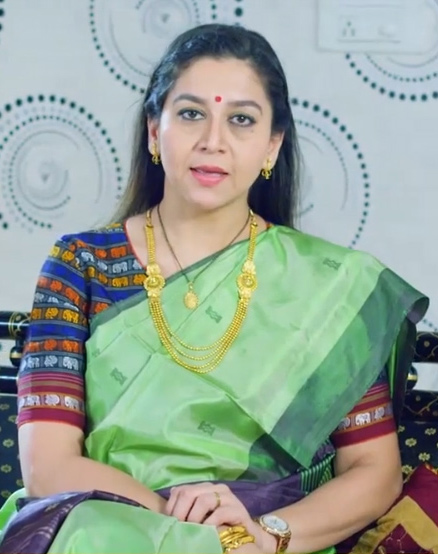
- Sudharani in 2020
- Born: Jayashree; Tumkuru, Karnataka, India
- Other name: Shali
- Occupation: Actress
- Years active: 1978–present
- Spouses: Sanjay (m. 1996; div. 1998) Govardhan (m. 2000)
- Children: 1

Jayashree, known by her screen name Sudha Rani, is an Indian actress, voice artist and former model. She has primarily worked in Kannada films in addition to some Telugu, Tamil, Tulu and Malayalam films. As on Feb 2024, she has acted in about 150 films across industries.

As a child artist, she acted in Kiladi Kittu (1978), Kulla Kulli (1980), Anupama (1981) Bhagyavantha and Ranganayaki (1981). She debuted as a lead actress at age 13 with Anand (1986). She has won the Filmfare Awards and the Karnataka State Film Awards twice for her performances in Panchama Veda (1990) and Mysore Mallige (1992).

== Early years ==
Sudha Rani was born in Tumakuru and brought up in Malleswaram, Bengaluru city, Karnataka into a Brahmin family of H. S. Gopalakrishna and Nagalakshmi. The family lived in the Malleswaram suburb of Bengaluru. Sudha Rani aspired to be a doctor since most of her relatives were into academics with many doctors among them. Her uncle was eminent film personality, Chi. Udaya Shankar.

Sudha Rani was educated at St. Thomas school, in its Malleswaram and Seshadripura branches, and recalled reading books being her pastime as a child. She first faced camera for an advertisement for Kwality Biscuits when she was two and a half years old. The cameraman of the advertisement recommended her name to director of the 1978 film, Kiladi Kittu, who cast her to play the younger version of Kavitha's character and her brother as the younger version of Rajinikanth's character. Her mother enrolled Sudha Rani in dance classes at age five; she would train in Kuchipudi and Bharata Natyam. At age 7, she was roped in by her brother for his short film based on children, titled as Child is Here which won an international award. She also actively participated in the children shows at the Prabhat Kalavidaru theatre troupe.

== Film career ==
=== 1978–1985: As child actor ===
Sudha was credited as Baby Jayashree in all her childhood projects. She made her first appearance in television in the Kwality biscuits advertisement when she was two and a half years old. At the age of three, she made her film debut with Kiladi Kittu in 1978 starring Vishnuvardhan and Rajinikanth. She played the younger role of the lead actress Kavitha in the film. This was followed by a series of child characters played in Kulla Kulli (1980), Puttanna Kanagal's Ranganayaki, Renuka Sharma's Anupama, Bhagyavantha (all released in 1981).

Sudharani in a film

=== 1986–2000: Debut as a lead and success ===
Sudha was noticed by producer Parvathamma Rajkumar in a thread ceremony video when she was 12 and was selected to play the lead role in the film Anand in 1986 opposite Shiva Rajkumar. The film turned out to be a major commercial success establishing the careers of both the lead actors. They became a popular pair and were cast in more films such as Mana Mechchida Hudugi (1987), Ranaranga (1988), Aasegobba Meesegobba (1990), Midida Shruthi (1992) and Samara (1995). In 1988, she played daughter to Dr. Rajkumar in Devatha Manushya. She reprised her role played in Mana Mechchida Hudugi in her Tamil debut, Annakili Sonna Kathai (1989), paired opposite Sathyaraj.

Few other films where Sudha's performance was noted during this period include Kashinath starrer Avane Nanna Ganda, Dwarakish directorial Krishna Nee Kunidaga (both 1989) and Panchama Veda (1990) which earned her first Karnataka State Film Award, the Telugu film, Master Kapuram (1990), where she was credited as Gayatri and the Tamil films, Vasanthakala Paravai (1991) and Thangakkili (1993), credited as Shali. In 1992, she featured in a lead role in K S Narasimha Swamy's poetry collection film, Mysore Mallige, directed by T. S. Nagabharana. She played the role of Padma who falls in love with a poet and entangles in the village's feudal structure. The film won several awards upon release including Sudha's maiden Filmfare Award and second Karnataka State Film Award.

After Shiva Rajkumar, her next successful pairing was with Ramesh Aravind. They both went on to star in over eight films, including Ganda Mane Makkalu (1988), Panchama Veda (1990), Vasanthakala Paravai, Varagala Bete (both 1991), Mouna Mozhi (1992), Srigandha, Aragini, Anuraga Sangama, Balondu Chaduranga (all 1995), and Accident (2008). Her other successful pairing were with Ambareesh (Saptapadi, Mannina Doni, Munjaneya Manju, Mr. Abhishek), V. Ravichandran (Mane Devru), Shashikumar (Swathi), Anant Nag (Nanenu Madlilla), Devaraj and Ramkumar (Kavya, Mahakshathriya). With actor Vishnuvardhan, she appeared, although not opposite role, in Mahakshathriya (1994) and Kona Edaithe (1995).

In 1995, she expanded to Malayalam films with Aadyathe Kanmani playing the lead role opposite Jayaram. She ended the decade with her comeback film after a brief hiatus of three years with a lead role in Sunil Kumar Desai's Sparsha (2000). She received her second Filmfare Award for her performance in the film.

=== 2001-till date: Supporting roles ===
After 2000, Sudha took up supporting roles with minimum screen space since she had to cater to her family responsibilities. She began this with a cameo appearance in K. Raghavendra Rao's Kannada-Telugu bilingual hagiographical film, Sri Manjunatha. Her next notable role came with Kavita Lankesh's Preethi Prema Pranaya (2003) which showcased three generations of couple life with Sudha pairing opposite Prakash Raj. Her performance as a sister-in-law to Puneeth Rajkumar in Namma Basava (2005) was praised by critics. Some other noteworthy roles came with Auto Shankar. Magic Ajji (both 2005), Thirupathi (2006), Mr. Garagasa, Navashakthi Vaibhava (both 2008), Ghauttham (2009), Dandupalya (2012) and Bharath Stores (2013). The satire comedy film Vaastu Prakaara (2015) earned her critical praise and won her Filmfare Best Supporting Actress award. She made a comeback to Tamil cinema with Nibunan which was simultaneously shot in Kannada under the title Vismaya in 2017. She took up lead actor mother roles in films such as Padde Huli, Amar and Geetha, all released in 2019. She wound up the decade playing Police Commissioner role in Kannad Gothilla (2019).

Sudha continued to feature in several films playing supporting roles in 2020s. These include Yuvarathnaa (2021), Avatara Purusha, Thurthu Nirgamana (both 2022), Yuva, Krishnam Pranaya Sakhi, Bagheera (all 2024) and the Kannada-Telugu bilingual Junior (2025).

== Personal life ==
Sudha Rani married a US-based anesthesia specialist, Dr. Sanjay, in 1996. However citing irreconcilable differences, they parted ways in 1998. In 2000, she married Govardhan, a chartered accountant. The couple have a daughter together, Nidhi, born in 2001.

== Filmography ==
=== Kannada films ===
Key
†	Denotes films that have not yet been released

Year	Film	Role	Notes	Ref.
1978	Kiladi Kittu	Young Geetha	Credited as Baby Jayashree	
1980	Kulla Kulli	Young Chitra	Credited as Baby Jayashree	
1981	Ranganayaki	Young Ranganayaki	Credited as Baby Jayashree	
1981	Anupama	Young Anupama	Credited as Baby Jayashree	
1981	Bhagyavantha	Young Tara	Credited as Baby Jayashree	
1982	Baadada Hoo	Usha	Credited as Sudha	
1986	Anand	Mala	Debut as lead actress	
1987	Manamecchida Hudugi	Gowri		
1987	Vijayotsava			
1988	Devatha Manushya	Seetha		
1988	Ganda Mane Makkalu	Kamala		
1988	Ranaranga	Shashikala		
1988	Sambhavami Yuge Yuge			
1989	Krishna Nee Kunidaga	Radha		
1989	Manmatha Raja	Rathi		
1989	Avane Nanna Ganda	Mangala		
1990	Panchama Veda	Rukmini		
1990	Aasegobba Meesegobba	Urmila		
1990	Ashoka Chakra	Asha		
1990	Halliya Surasuraru	Gowri		
1990	Prathap	Shanthi		
1990	Shabarimale Swamy Ayyappa	Parvati		
1990	Thrinethra	Asha		
1991	Varagala Bete			
1992	Mysore Mallige	Padma		
1992	Midida Shruthi	Sujatha		
1992	Mannina Doni	Sowbhagya/Padmavathi (Note: She played one character with two names.)		
1992	Jeevana Chaitra	Lakshmi	Extended special appearance	
1992	Sapthapadi	Sudha		
1992	Belliyappa Bangarappa	Herself	Cameo	
1992	Hosa Raaga			
1993	Munjaneya Manju	Meera		
1993	Mane Devru	Janaki		
1993	Bhagawan Sri Saibaba	Parvati		
1993	Hrudaya Bandhana	Dr. Asha		
1993	Ananda Jyothi	Jyothi		
1993	Kumkuma Bhagya	Mary		
1993	Chinnari Mutha	Marisha	Special appearance in song Maarisha Maarisha	
1994	Mahakshathriya	Priyadarshini/Lakshmi	Double role	
1994	Swathi	Swathi		
1994	Gold Medal	Usha		
1994	Vijaya Kankana	Nayana		
1994	Curfew	Sudha	Cameo	
1995	Srigandha	Arundathi		
1995	Aragini	Rani		
1995	Kona Edaithe	Vishnu's wife	Cameo	
1995	Mister Abhishek	Kiran		
1995	Anuraga Sangama	Kasthuri		
1995	Samara	Usha		
1995	Kavya	Kavya		
1996	Simhadri			
1996	Vasantha Kavya	Kavya		
1996	Stunt Master	Pooja		
1999	Naanenu Maadlilla	Chitra		
2000	Sparsha	Radha		
2001	Sri Manjunatha	Bhoodevi	Cameo	
2001	Chandana Chiguru	Bharathi		
2002	Thrishakthi	Jahnavi		
2003	Badri		Cameo	
2003	Preethi Prema Pranaya	Jyothi		
2003	Khaaki	Tulasi		
2004	Bimba	Dolly		
2004	Talikattuva Shubhavele	Jyothi		
2005	Namma Basava	Basava's sister-in-law		
2005	Anna Thangi	Annapurna		
2005	Thunta	Sudha		
2005	Auto Shankar	Geetha		
2005	Magic Ajji	Nirmala Devi		
2005	Abhinandane	Kamala		
2006	Tirupathi	District Commissioner Margaret		
2006	O Priyathama	Vasu		
2006	Mandya	Gayatri		
2007	Thamashegagi	Ramya		
2007	Ee Preethi Yeke Bhoomi Melide	Chikkayya's wife	Cameo	
2008	Accident	Suguna Shankar	Cameo	
2008	Mr. Garagasa	Gauri		
2008	Prachanda Ravana	Mandodari		
2008	Navashakthi Vaibhava	Sharadamba		
2009	Maleyali Jotheyali	Lucky's mother	Cameo	
2009	Ghauttham	Rajeswari		
2009	Bhagyada Balegara	Unnamed	Special appearance in song "Ghallu Ghallenutha"	
2009	Eshtu Nagthi Nagu			
2009	Huchchi			
2009	Ishwar			
2010	Kaanana	Basanthi		
2010	Thamassu	Munavar's mother	Cameo	
2011	Jolly Boy	Indramma Gopalaswamy		
2012	Jeevana Joke-alli	Amrutha		
2012	Indina Satya			
2012	Dandupalya	Bharathi		
2012	Guru	Tejaswini		
2013	Bharath Stores	Bharathi		
2014	Vasundhara			
2014	Sachin! Tendulkar Alla			
2014	Bahaddur	Doctor		
2014	Belli	Nidhi		
2015	Siddhartha			
2015	Vaastu Prakaara	Vandana		
2015	Rebel			
2015	Billa			
2015	Luv U Alia	Kiran's mother		
2015	Plus	Samarthana		
2015	Sharpshooter			
2016	Siganduru Chowdeshwari Mahime	Chowdeshwari Devi		
2016	July 22, 1947			
2017	Happy New Year	Varalakshmi		
2017	Dada is Back			
2017	Vismaya	Dr. Prema		
2017	Bharjari			
2018	Life Jothe Ondh Selfie	Thulsi		
2019	Padde Huli	Sampath's mother		
2019	Premier Padmini	Spandana		
2019	Amar	Amar's mother		
2019	Chitrakatha	Samaya		
2019	Geetha	Geethanjali		
2019	Vrithra			
2019	Kannad Gothilla	Commissioner of Police		
2020	Mayabazar 2016	Usha		
2020	Law	Dr. Vimala Pathak		
2021	Yuvarathnaa	Professor		
2022	Trikona	Seetha		
2022	Avatara Purusha Part 1	Yashodha		
2022	Thurthu Nirgamana	Nurse		
2022	Vasanthi Nalidaga	Madhu		
2023	Prajarajya	Vagdevi		
2024	Juni	Juni's Mother		
2024	Yuva	Girija		
2024	Avatara Purusha Part 2	Yashodha		
2024	Bagheera	Vedhanth's mother		
2025	Firefly	Padma		
2025	Junior	Meera	Bilingual film	
2025	Nidradevi Next Door	Sudha		
2025	45	Herself	Special appearance	
2026	Chowkidar	Uma Shankar		

=== Tamil films ===
Year	Film	Role	Notes	Ref.
1989	Annakili Sonna Kathai	Gowri		
1991	Vasanthakala Paravai	Uma	Credited as Shali	
1992	Vasantha Malargal	Shanthi	Credited as Shali	
1992	Mouna Mozhi	Kasthuri	Credited as Shali	
1992	Sugamana Sumaigal		Credited as Shali	
1993	Thangakkili	Swathi	Credited as Shali	
2017	Nibunan	Dr. Prema		

=== Telugu films ===
Year	Film	Role	Notes	Ref.
1990	Master Kapuram	Geeta	Credited as Gayatri	
1990	Chinna Kodalu			
1990	Ankitham			
1990	Irugillu Porugillu			
1991	Srisaila Bhramarambika Kataksham	Bhramarambika		
2019	Jessie	Dr. Aradhya		
2025	Junior	Meera	Bilingual film	

=== Other language films ===
Year	Film	Role	Language	Notes	Ref.
1993	Bangar Patler		Tulu		
1995	Aadyathe Kanmani	Ambika	Malayalam		

=== Voice-over ===
Year	Film	Actress
1999	Premotsava	Roja
2002	Simhadriya Simha	Meena
2004	Maurya	Roja
2004	Monalisa	Sadha
2012	Prasad	Madhuri Bhattacharya
2014	Maanikya	Ramya Krishnan
2022	K.G.F: Chapter 2	Raveena Tandon

== Television ==
Year	Serial	Role	Language	Notes	Ref.
2002	Kungumam serial	Seetha	Tamil		
2007	Mega Bangarada Bete	Host	Kannada	The Kannada version of Mega Thangavettai, a revamped adaptation of the Tamil game show Thanga Vettai, was titled Mega Bangarada Bete. The show initially featured actress Vijayalakshmi (Kannada actress) as the host for the first few weeks. She was later replaced by actress Sudharani. Subsequently, the hosting duties were taken over by actress Tara (Kannada actress), who continued as the host until the end of the season.	
2008	Jeevana Sangathi	Host	Kannada	The Kannada version of Tamil game show Thiruvalar Thirumathi.	
2016	Aramane	Role	Kannada		

== Awards and nominations ==
Year (Note: Refers to the year in which the ceremony was held.)	Work	Award	Category	Result	Ref(s)
1987	Mana Mechchida Hudugi	BR Panthulu Award	Best Actress	Won	
1991	Panchama Veda	Karnataka State Film Awards	Best Actress	Won	
1992	Mysore Mallige	Karnataka State Film Awards	Best Actress	Won	
1992	Mysore Mallige	Filmfare Awards South	Best Actress	Won	
2000	Sparsha	Filmfare Awards South	Best Actress	Won	
2015	Vaastu Prakaara	Filmfare Awards South	Best Supporting Actress – Kannada	Won	
2019	Life Jothe Ondh Selfie	Filmfare Awards South	Best Supporting Actress – Kannada	Nominated	
2023	Thurthu Nirgamana	Chandanavana Film Critics Academy Awards	Best Supporting Actress	Won	
