= Sanketh Kashi =

Indian actor (1954–2016)

- Born: 1954
- Died: 6 August 2016 (age 62); Bangalore, India
- Occupation: Film actor

Kashi (1954 – 2016) known by his professional name Sanketh Kashi, was an Indian actor in the Kannada film industry. Some of the notable films of Kashi as an actor include Ulta Palta (1997), Nammoora Mandara Hoove (1996), Beladingalagi Baa (2008), and Mangalyam Tantunanena (1998).

== Career ==
Kashi was part of more than one hundred and forty films in Kannada, including television series 'Malgudi Days'.

== Awards ==
Year	Award	Film	Category	Result
1997-98	Karnataka State Film Awards	Ulta Palta	Special Jury Award	Won

== Selected filmography ==
1. Makkaliralavva Mane Thumba (1984)
2. Accident (1985)
3. Panchama Veda (1990)
4. Mane Devru (1993)
5. Annayya (1993)
6. Nishkarsha (1993)
7. Curfew (1994)
8. Indrana Gedda Narendra (1994)
9. Halunda Thavaru (1994)
10. Aragini (1995)
11. Mutthinantha Hendathi (1995)
12. Dore (1995)
13. Sipayi (1996)
14. Nammoora Mandara Hoove (1996)
15. Ulta Palta (1997)
16. Nishyabda (1998)
17. Hendithghelthini (1998)
18. Mangalyam Tantunanena (1998)
19. Naanu Nanna Hendthiru (1999)
20. Sneha (1999)
21. O Premave (1999)
22. Sparsha (2000)
23. Maduve Aagona Baa (2001)
24. Chitra (2001)
25. Nandhi (2002)
26. Ananda (2003)
27. Excuse Me (2003)
28. Swathi Muthu (2003)
29. Samskaravantha (2009)
30. Kirataka (2011)
31. Kanteerava (2011)
32. Dandupalya (2012)
33. Mr. Airavata (2015)
34. Jaggu Dada (2016)

== See also ==
- List of people from Karnataka
- Cinema of Karnataka
- List of Indian film actors
- Cinema of India
