= Vinaya Prasad =

Indian actress (born 1967)

- Born: Vinaya Bhat; 22 November 1965 (age 60); Udupi, Karnataka, India
- Occupation: Actress
- Years active: 1986–present
- Spouses: V. R. K. Prasad (m. 1988; died 1995); Jyotiprakash (m. 2002)

Vinaya Prakash (née Bhat), (22 November 1967) also credited as Vinaya Prasad, is an Indian actress known for her work predominantly in Kannada and Malayalam films in addition to a few Telugu, Tamil and Tulu films. Vinaya has appeared in more than 200 films and was one of the most sought after actresses during the 1990s.

Vinaya started her career in 1986 in the G. V. Iyer directed biographical film Madhwacharya. Her lead role and breakthrough came with the comedy film Ganeshana Maduve in 1990. The film was a huge commercial success and marked her shift from small roles to leading roles in Kannada cinema. She continued to appear in successful comedy films such as Gauri Ganesha (1991), Neenu Nakkare Haalu Sakkare (1991), Yarigu Helbedi (1994) and Kona Eedaithe (1995). Her debut in Malayalam cinema came with the critically acclaimed Perumthachan (1991) directed by Ajayan. This was followed by a string of performance-oriented roles in films that include Aathanka (1993), Manichithrathazhu (1993), Karulina Koogu (1994), Pidakkozhi Koovunna Noottandu (1994), Thumbida Mane (1995) and Krishnagudiyil Oru Pranayakalathu (1997). Her portrayal as a Nepali immigrant in her Tamil debut, Thaikulame Thaikulame (1995) brought her widespread recognition.

After 2000, Vinaya switched over to performing supporting characters across all the South Indian language films. Apart from films, Vinaya has established herself in television series and reality shows.

== Early life and education ==
Vinaya Prasad was born into a Brahmin family in Udupi, Karnataka. Her father, S. Krishna Bhat, was an officer at the LIC, and her mother, Vatsala, was a schoolteacher.

Vinaya studied at St. Cecily's Convent in Udupi and completed her B.Com. from Poornaprajna College, Udupi. She received her first film opportunity during her college years.

== Career ==
Vinaya made her film debut with a small role in G. V. Iyer's Madhwacharya in 1986 where she played the role of one of the three queens of the King. She worked in smaller character roles before playing the leading lady in Ganeshana Maduve opposite Anant Nag. The film was a huge success and she went on to act in many more films in not only Kannada but also Malayalam, Telugu and Tamil . Some of her notable Kannada films include Ganeshana Maduve, Neenu Nakkare Haalu Sakkare, Gauri Ganesha, Mysore Jaana and Suryodaya. She starred in a supporting role in Manichitrathazhu, opposite Mohanlal. In Tamil, she has acted as the heroine in the movie Thaikulame Thaikulame with Pandiarajan and Urvashi. In Telugu, her movies include Indra, Donga Dongadi and Andhrudu, for which her performance won a lot of praise.

After a successful career as a lead actress, Vinaya switched over to character roles. She is also an effective compere and singer. She has compered several important events like Vasantha Habba in Nrityagram and the annual Dasara procession in Mysore. She has starred in the longest-running and most popular daily soap opera on Malayalam TV, Sthree, which aired from late 1998 to mid 2000 on Asianet television channel. The popularity of this soap made her a household name among Malayalis. In 2006, she returned to the Malayalam small screen to reprise her role as Indu in the sequel to the original Sthree, also named, Sthree.

== Personal life ==
Vinaya is from the Udupi district in Karnataka and was raised in Udupi. In 1988, she married V. R. K. Prasad, a director and editor of Kannada films, who died at a young age.

In 2002, Vinaya married Jyotiprakash after they met during the making of the television series Sanjeevani. The couple currently resides in Bangalore with her husband and daughter Prathama Prasad. Jyotiprakash has a son named Jai Atre, from his previous marriage, who is into film direction and screenwriting in Mumbai.

== Filmography ==
=== Kannada films ===
List of Vinaya Prasad Kannada film credits
Year	Title	Roles	Notes
1986	Madhwacharya		Credited as Vinaya Bhat
1990	Ganeshana Maduve	Aadhi Lakshmi	
1990	Policena Hendthi		
1990	Baare Nanna Muddina Rani	Doctor	
1990	College Hero		
1991	Gauri Ganesha	Sarasu	
1991	Neenu Nakkare Haalu Sakkare	Ramya	
1991	Ide Police Belt		
1991	Kiladi Gandu	Lakshmi	
1991	Shwethagni		
1991	Gururayara Soththu		
1991	Nayaka		
1992	Mysore Jaana	Asha	
1992	Midida Shruthi		
1992	Rajadhi Raja		
1992	Police File		
1992	Police Lockup		
1992	Shakthi Yukthi	Seetha	
1992	Goonda Rajya		
1992	Agni Panjara	Vinaya	
1993	Dakshayini	Sujatha	
1993	Bhavya Bharatha		
1993	Gundana Maduve		
1993	Sarkarakke Saval		
1993	Aathanka	Vaani	
1993	Suryodaya	Pramila	
1994	Karulina Koogu	Sharada	
1994	Mouna Raga	Lavanya	
1994	Nanendu Nimmavane		
1994	Samrat		Special appearance
1994	Yarigu Helbedi		
1994	Mahashakthi Maaye	Soubhagya	
1994	Anuraga Spandana		
1994	Durga Pooje		
1995	Kalyanotsava		
1995	Kona Edaithe	Goddess of Justice	
1995	Shiva		
1995	Thumbida Mane		
1995	Thavaru Beegaru	Lakshmi	
1995	Mutthinantha Hendathi		
1995	Lady Police		
1996	Mahathai		
1996	Sowbhagya Devathe		
1996	Central Jail		
1996	Hrudaya kallaru	Vinaya	
1996	Sipayi		
1996	Thali Pooje	Punya	
1996	Sathya Sangharsha		
1996	Mouna Raga		
1996	Balina Jyothi	Janaki	
1996	GodFather		
1996	Anuraga Spandana		
1997	Laali		Guest appearance
1997	Kalla Banda Kalla		
1997	Yuva Shakthi		
1997	Baalida Mane	Archana	
1997	Bhoomi Geetha		
1997	Mangala Sutra	Seetha	
1997	Raaja		
1997	Manava 2022		
1998	Andaman		
1998	Preethsod Thappa	Bhavani	
1998	Daayadi		
1998	Hoomale	Vinaya	Cameo
1999	Tuvvi Tuvvi Tuvvi		
1999	Maha Edabidangi	Vinaya	
1999	Chandrodaya	Lawyer	
2000	Independence Day		
2001	Bannada Hejje	Seetha	
2001	Baava Baamaida	Lekshmi	
2004	Love		
2004	Nimma Preethiya Huduga		
2004	Srirampura Police Station		
2004	Monda		
2005	Rishi	Lekshmi	
2005	Nenapirali		
2006	Hatavadi		
2006	Dattha		
2006	Ashoka		
2006	Shree		
2006	Student		
2007	Thayiya Madilu		
2007	Aa Dinagalu	Chethan's mother	
2007	Krishna	Anjali's mother	
2007	Ugadi		
2007	Ee Preethi Yeke Bhoomi Melide		Guest appearance
2008	Ravi Shastry		
2008	Honganasu		
2008	Ganesha Mathe Bandha		
2008	Satya in Love		
2008	Sangaathi		
2008	Chikkamagaloora Chikka Mallige		
2008	PUC		
2008	Hrudaya I Miss You		
2008	Huttidare Kannada Nadalli Huttabeku		
2008	Jnana Jyothi Sri Siddaganga	—N/a	dubbing
2008	Indra		
2008	Bombaat	Anand's mother	
2008	Shankara Punyakoti	Parvathy	
2009	Ghauttham		
2009	10th Class A Sec		
2009	Shivamani		
2010	Aptharakshaka	Gowri's mother	
2010	Shankar IPS		
2010	Cheluveye Ninne Nodalu	Sumithra	
2010	Nee Bandu Ninthaga		
2010	Pareekshe		
2010	Parole		
2010	Modalasala		
2011	Krishnan Marriage Story		
2011	Veera Babu		
2011	I Am Sorry Mathe Banni Preethsona		
2012	Shakthi		
2012	18th Cross		
2012	Paper Dhoni		
2012	Adhikara		
2012	Parie		
2012	Sagar		
2013	Madarangi		
2013	Shravani Subramanya		
2013	Sri Aadiparashakthi		
2013	Hara		
2013	Sakkare	Vasundhara	
2014	Preethi Geethi Ityadi		
2014	Central Jail		
2014	Abhimanyu	Nandhini's mother	
2015	RX Soori		
2015	Geetha Bangle Store		
2015	Vamshodharaka		
2016	Tyson		
2016	Shivalinga	Satya's mother	
2016	Madhura Swapna		
2016	Kalpana 2	Mary	
2016	Akshathe		
2016	Vaishnavi	Saraswathi	
2016	Brahma Vishnu Maheshwara		
2017	March 22	Mumtaj	
2017	Dhvani		
2017	Lakshminarayanara Prapanchane Bere	Lekshmi	Also actor/director
2018	Rajaratha	Usha	
2018	Viraaj		
2019	Khanana		
2020	Kaanadante Maayavadanu	Nirupama	
2022	Maaraya		
2022	September 13	Dr. Shubha	
2022	Vijayanand	Chandramma	
2024	Juni	Partha's mother	
2024	Jigar		
2024	Thamate		
2025	Muruga S/o Kaanunu		
2025	GST		
2026	Mother Promise	Sharadamma	

=== Malayalam films ===
List of Vinaya Prasad Malayalam film credits
Year	Title	Roles	Notes
1991	Perunthachan	Bhargavi Thampuratti	
1991	Mookilla Rajyathu	Leena	
1993	Manichitrathazhu	Sreedevi	
1994	Pidakkozhi Koovunna Noottandu	Nancy Joseph	
1996	Laalanam	Sasikala	
1996	Swantham Makalkku Snehapoorvam		
1997	Krishnagudiyil Oru Pranayakalathu	Uma	
2001	Bhadra	Bhadra	
2001	The Gift of God		
2009	Oru Black And White Kudumbam	Lakshmi	
2010	Marykkundoru Kunjaadu	Mary	
2010	24 Hours	Leela Varma	
2011	Aan Piranna Veedu	Jithin's mother	
2012	Spanish Masala	Rahul's mother	
2012	Perinoru Makan	Bhanumathi	
2014	Om Shanti Oshana	Rachel	
2014	Ulsaha Committee	Jhansi	
2014	Bangalore Days	Mrs Francis	
2014	Avatharam	Karimban John's wife	
2014	Villali Veeran	Geetha	
2014	Cousins	Theresa	
2015	Two Countries	Revathy	
2016	Shajahanum Pareekuttiyum	Nancy	
2016	Welcome to Central Jail	Janaki	
2017	Sunday Holiday	Narayanankutty's wife	Cameo
2018	Aami	Sulochana Nalappat	
2018	Chanakya Thanthram	Arundhathi	
2018	Mottita Mullakal	Badhravathi	
2019	Madhura Raja	Lillykutty teacher	
2022	Kaypakka	Parvathi	
2022	Heaven	Mariyam	
2024	Extra Decent	Lakshmi	
2025	Thug	Rebecca	
2026	Maduramee Jeevitham	Madhavikutty	

=== Telugu films ===
List of Vinaya Prasad Telugu film credits
Year	Title	Roles	Notes
1996	Nayudu Gari Kutumbam		
2000	Kalisundam Raa	Anasooya	
2002	Indra		
2004	Donga Dongadi		
2005	Andhrudu	Munna's mother	
2005	Subash Chandra Bose		
2006	Chinnodu		
2007	Aadavari Matalaku Ardhalu Verule	Janaki	
2008	Ready	Pooja's aunt	
2008	Souryam	Commissioner Sarath's wife	
2009	Anjaneyulu	Lekshmi	
2009	Bangaru Babu		
2010	Adhurs		
2010	Varudu	Deepti's mother	
2010	Namo Venkatesa	Pooja's aunt	
2010	Bava		
2011	Oh My Friend		
2011	Dookudu	Tulasi	
2012	Lovely	Lavanya's mother	
2012	Shirdi Sai	Baajiya Bai	
2013	Sketch for Love		
2013	Doosukeltha	Alekhya's mother	
2013	Bhai		
2013	Shadow	Lakshmi's sister-in-law	
2014	Power	Baldev's mother	
2014	Jaihind 2	Nandhini's mother	
2016	Sarrainodu	Gana's mother	

=== Tamil films ===
List of Vinaya Prasad Tamil film credits
Year	Title	Roles	Notes
1995	Thaikulame Thaikulame	Monisha	
2000	Independence Day		
2005	Chandramukhi	Lakshmi Kandaswamy	
2005	Ambuttu Imbuttu Embuttu	Vijaya	
2008	Vaitheeswaran	Saravanan's mother	
2014	Jaihind 2	Nandhini's mother	
2015	Anegan	Madhumitha's mother	
2019	Igloo	Jaya	

=== Tulu films ===
List of Vinaya Prasad Tulu film credits
Year	Title	Roles	Notes
2007	Koti Chennaya		
2016	Panoda Bodcha		

== Television ==
Serials

List of Vinaya Prasad television serials credits
Year	Series	Role	Language	Channel
1987	Bisilu Kudure		Kannada	
1990	Badukkinalli Ondu Tiruvu	Savithri	Kannada	
1991	Kavalu Dari		Kannada	
1998	Shakthi		Kannada	
1998–2000	Sthree	Indu	Malayalam	Asianet
2000–2001	Sthree (Part 2)		Malayalam	Asianet
2002	Sarada	Sarada	Malayalam	Asianet
2003	Sthree	Indu	Kannada	Asianet Kaveri
2004	Nanda Gokula		Kannada	Asianet Kaveri
2005–2007	Sthree (Sequel to Part 1)	Indu	Malayalam	Asianet
2007–2008	Priyamanasi	Manasi	Malayalam	Surya TV
2009	Sreemahabhagavatham	Kunti	Malayalam	Asianet
2010	Devimahatymam	Devamma	Malayalam	Asianet
2010	Anupama	Anupama	Kannada	Zee Kannada
2010–2013	Bangaara	Kanchana	Kannada	Udaya TV
2011	Devimahatymam	Shivani	Malayalam	Asianet
2013	Nithyothsava	Pratibha Guntur	Kannada	Zee Kannada
2014–2015	Balamani	Sumangala a.k.a. Azhakathamma	Malayalam	Mazhavil Manorama
2016	Ponnambili	Appu mash's wife (Photo Presence)	Malayalam	Mazhavil Manorama
2016	Sundari	Nandini	Kannada	Udaya TV
2017–2018	Ammuvinte Amma	Padmaja	Malayalam	Mazhavil Manorama
2018–2024	Paaru	Akhilandeshwari	Kannada	Zee Kannada
2020	Roja	Renuka Devi (cameo)	Tamil	Sun TV
2020	Thinkalkalamaan	Kalamandalam Umadevi	Malayalam	Surya TV
2020–2021	Anbe Vaa	Annalakshmi	Tamil	Sun TV
2024	Snehapoorvam Shyama		Malayalam	Zee Keralam

Shows

List of Vinaya Prasad television show credits
Year	Title	Role	Language	Channel
2007, 2008, 2009	Star Singer	Celebrity judge	Malayalam	Asianet
2010	Nanna Haadu Nannadu	Host	Kannada	Zee Kannada
2011	Hairomax Mrs.Kerala	Judge	Malayalam	UT TV
2012	Sakhiyare Sakath Maathu	Host	Kannada	Udaya TV
2013	Amma	Host	Kannada	Udaya TV
2015	Kitchen Galatta	Contestant	Tamil	Sun TV
2018	Comedy Stars Season 2	Judge	Malayalam	Asianet
2018	Comedy Super Night	Herself	Malayalam	Flowers TV
2019	Weekend with Ramesh Season 4	Guest	Kannada	Zee Kannada
2020	Thutta Mutta	Participant	Kannada	Udaya TV
2021	Red Carpet	Mentor	Malayalam	Amrita TV
2022	Panam Tharum Padam	Participant	Malayalam	Mazhavil Manorama
2022	Jodi No 1	Akhilandeshwari	Kannada	Zee Kannada
2022	Flowers Oru Kodi	Participant	Malayalam	Flowers TV
2023	Enteamma Superaa	Judge	Malayalam	Mazhavil Manorama
