= Kodlu Ramakrishna =

Kannada film director

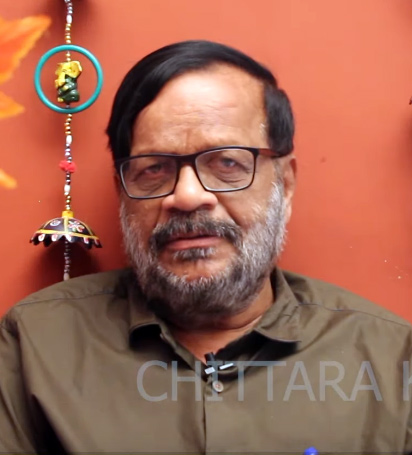
- Kodlu Ramakrishna (2020)
- Born: Ramakrishna; Tirthahalli, Karnataka, India
- Occupations: Director, producer
- Years active: 1986 – present

Kodlu Ramkrishna is a Kannada film director from Tirthahalli in Karnataka.

== Life and career ==
Kodlu Ramkrishna hails from Kodlu Village in Tirthahalli Taluk, Shimoga District. He has worked in the Kannada Film Industry for more than three decades. Kodlu has directed and produced 25 movies and 100 documentaries. He is one of the few directors who has directed movies on popular Kannada novels. He has got 4 state awards from state government. He has introduced many actors, actresses and singers to the Kannada film Industry including Diganth, Bhavana, M.D.Shridhar, Shamita Malnad, Guru Kiran (introduced to Tulu film industry), Rajesh Krishnan, etc. Hailing from a village, his main vision is to introduce more talents from the rural villages to the TV and Film Industry.

== Filmography ==
Year	Film	Credited as			Language	Notes
Year	Film	Director	Writer	Producer	Language	Notes
1989	Bisilu Beladingalu	✓		✗	Kannada	
1990	Rathri Pagal	✓		✗	Tulu	
1990	Muraligana Amritapana	✓		✗	Kannada	
1990	Udbhava	✓		✗	Kannada	
1993	Kadambari	✓	✓	✗	Kannada	
1994	Yarigu Helbedi	✓		✗	Kannada	
1995	Kavya	✓	✓	✗	Kannada	
1995	Nilukada Nakshathra	✓		✗	Kannada	
1997	Nee Mudida Mallige	✓	✓	✗	Kannada	
1997	Putra Vatsalya	✓		✗	Kannada	
1999	Idu Entha Premavayya	✓		✗	Kannada	
1999	Premi No. 1	✓		✗	Kannada	
2000	Swalpa Adjust Madkolli	✓		✗	Kannada	
2000	Tudar	✓		✗	Tulu	
2003	Hello	✓	✓	✗	Kannada	
2006	Miss California	✓	✓	✗	Kannada	
2007	Tamashegagi	✓		✗	Kannada	
2007	Karavali Hudugi	✓		✗	Kannada	
2011	Mr. Duplicate	✓	✓	✗	Kannada	
2009	Bettadapurada Ditta Makkalu	✓		✗	Kannada	
2008	Chilipili Hakkigalu	✓		✗	Kannada	
2013	Manasa	✓		✗	Kannada	
2014	Makkale Manikya	✓		✗	Kannada	
2014	Aata Pata	✓		✗	Kannada	
2015	Eregla Panodchi	✓		✗	Tulu	
2017	March 22	✓	✓	✗	Kannada	
2020	Matte Udbhava	✓	✓	✗	Kannada	
2021	Makkala Tantege Bandre Hushar	✓		✗	Kannada	
