= Sathyabhama (actress) =

Indian actress

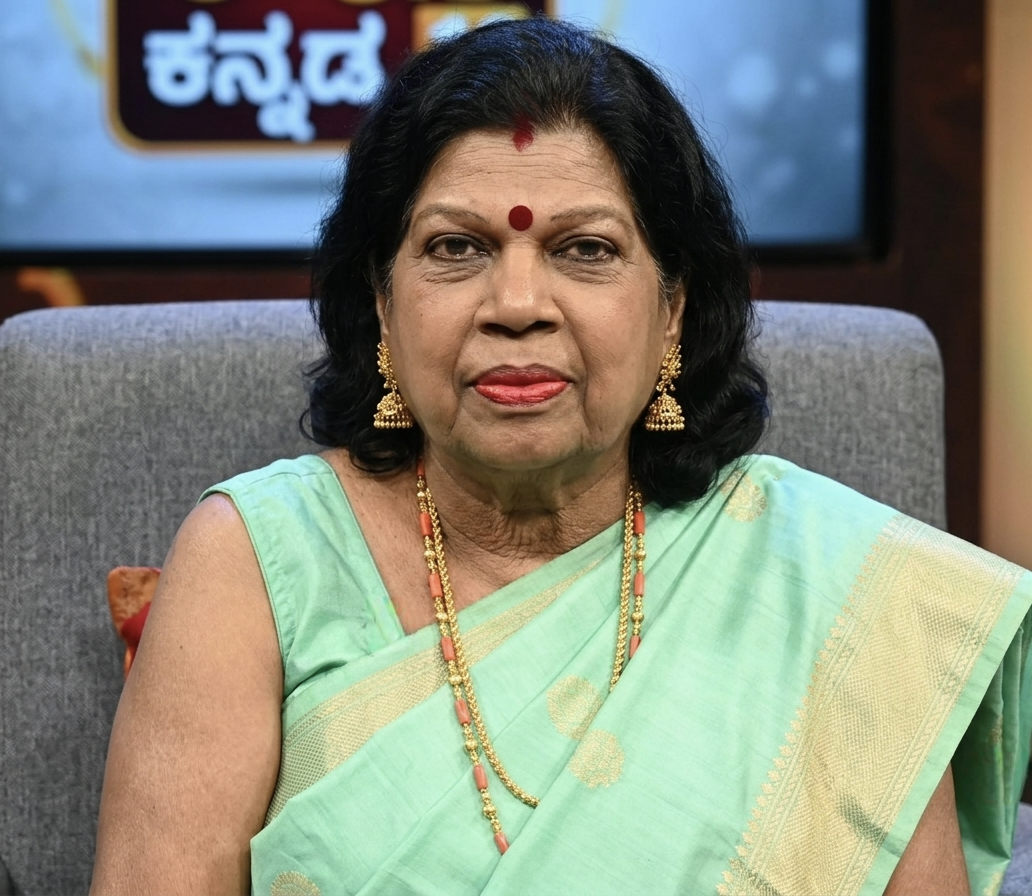
- Born: Brahmavara, Udupi, Karnataka, India
- Occupation: Film Actress

Sathyabhama is an Indian actress in the Kannada film industry. Her films include Golmaal Radhakrishna (1990), Bandhana (1984), and Nanjundi Kalyana (1989).

== Career ==
Before became an actress in films, she acted in Kannada theatre. She is the daughter of P. Kalinga Rao's nephew. In her 25 years of theatre career, she was widely recognized for her role Rani Chennamma in the drama Veera Rani Chennamma. After watching her performance in the drama, director S. Siddalingaiah offered Sathyabhama a role in his film Hemavathi in 1977, which marked her entry to films. Sathyabhama has appeared in more than two hundred Kannada films.

== Selected filmography ==
- Hemavathi (1977)
- Guru Shishyaru (1981)
- Benkiya Bale (1983)
- Karna (1986)
- Mithileya Seetheyaru (1988)
- Chiranjeevi Sudhakar (1988)
- Krishna Nee Kunidaga (1989)
- Nammoora Hammera (1990)
- Ganeshana Maduve (1990)
- Ramachaari (1991)
- Golmaal Radhakrishna 2 (1991)
- Hendtheere Hushar (1992)
- Golibar (1993)
- September 8 (1994; Tulu)
- Shiva Sainya (1996)...Manamohanamma
- Orange (2018)...Gowramma

== See also ==
- List of people from Karnataka
- Cinema of Karnataka
- List of Indian film actresses
- Cinema of India
