= List of songs recorded by Manjula Gururaj =

Manjula Gururaj (Kannada: ಮಂಜುಳಾ ಗುರುರಾಜ್) is an Indian female playback singer and a voice-over artist who has primarily worked in Kannada cinema and also runs a music school. She has sung over 500 songs in Kannada language. The following is a list of her songs:

== 1980s ==
Year	Film	Song	Composer(s)	Writer(s)	Co-singer(s)
1984	Rowdy Raaja	"Naguvudanu Kaliyuveya"	Satyam	Chi. Udayashankar	Solo
1985	Brahma Gantu	"Avarendu Nannoru"	Vijayanand	Chi. Udayashankar	S. Janaki
1985	Devarelliddane	"Sri Krishna Bandayithu"	S. P. Balasubrahmanyam	Chi. Udayashankar	P. B. Srinivas, S. P. Balasubrahmanyam
1985	Nee Bareda Kadambari	"Ee Prema Hithavagide"	Vijayanand	R. N. Jayagopal	S. P. Balasubrahmanyam
1985	Nee Bareda Kadambari	"Surya Chandra Akashake"	Vijayanand	Chi. Udayashankar	S. P. Balasubrahmanyam
1985	Parameshi Prema Prasanga	"Preethi Lokada"	G. K. Venkatesh	Doddarange Gowda	Rajkumar Bharathi
1985	Parameshi Prema Prasanga	"Uppilla Menasilla"	G. K. Venkatesh	M. N. Vyasa Rao	Rajkumar Bharathi
1985	Shiva Kotta Sowbhagya	"Giniye Sobagina Giniye"	T. G. Lingappa	Hunsur Krishnamurthy	P. Jayachandran
1985	Shiva Kotta Sowbhagya	"Bale Thodisalu"	T. G. Lingappa	Hunsur Krishnamurthy	Solo
1985	Sneha Sambhanda	"Kaddu Kaddu"	G. K. Venkatesh	Chi. Udayashankar	Ramesh Chandra
1985	Thrishula	"Buguriyanthe Thirugona"	Kalyan-Venkatesh	Siddalingaiah	S. P. Sailaja
1985	Thrishula	"Kunthre Ninthre Avande Dhyana"	Kalyan-Venkatesh	Siddalingaiah	Solo
1986	Africadalli Sheela	"Thakka Dhimi Thakka"	Bappi Lahiri	Chi. Udayashankar	Solo
1986	Africadalli Sheela	"Hey Hennu Illade"	Bappi Lahiri	R. N. Jayagopal	Solo
1986	Africadalli Sheela	"Thampada Tholu"	Bappi Lahiri	R. N. Jayagopal	K. J. Yesudas
1986	Belli Naaga	"Karavanu Mugive"	Satyam	Chi. Udayashankar	S. Janaki, Rama
1986	Lancha Lancha Lancha	"Ee Jeeva Neralaagide"	Kalyan-Venkatesh	Siddalingaiah	Vani Jairam, Unnikrishnan
1986	Maneye Manthralaya	"Maneye Mantralaya"	M. Ranga Rao	Chi. Udayashankar	K. J. Yesudas, S. Janaki, Ramesh Chandra
1986	Maneye Manthralaya	"Endendu Baalali Heege"	M. Ranga Rao	Chi. Udayashankar	K. J. Yesudas, S. Janaki, Ramesh Chandra
1986	Mouna Geethe	"Hadavada Hadinentu"	M. Ranga Rao	Geethapriya	Surendar
1986	Samsarada Guttu	"Hey Chaithrave"	Satyam	R. N. Jayagopal	S. P. Balasubrahmanyam
1986	Samsarada Guttu	"O Devathe Prema Devathe"	Satyam	R. N. Jayagopal	S. P. Balasubrahmanyam
1987	Agni Kanye	"Hey Dundu Henne"	Shankar-Ganesh	Chi. Udayashankar	Ramesh Chandra
1987	Bala Nauke	"Yanka Manka"	K. P. Sukhadev	Doddarange Gowda	Solo
1987	Daiva Shakthi	"Maruthi Kaarinalli"	Hamsalekha	Hamsalekha	Solo
1987	Daiva Shakthi	"Raagi Machine Ownerayyoo"	Hamsalekha	Hamsalekha	Jayapal
1987	Daiva Shakthi	"Raghavendra Mathanaado"	Hamsalekha	Vijaya Narasimha	Solo
1987	Mr. Raja	"Are Dammare Dammamma"	Hamsalekha		Jayapal
1987	Ravana Rajya	"Thande Nee Needubaa"	Vijayanand	R. N. Jayagopal	K. S. Chithra
1987	Sathwa Pareekshe	"Preethi Endarenu"	Vijayanand	Chi. Udayashankar	S. P. Balasubrahmanyam
1987	Yarigagi	"Kalegala Thavarooru"	G. K. Venkatesh	Doddarange Gowda	Solo
1988	Anjada Gandu	"Preethiyalli Iro Sukha"	Hamsalekha	Hamsalekha	S. P. Balasubrahmanyam
1988	Anjada Gandu	"Modala Baari Hitthalinalli"	Hamsalekha	R. N. Jayagopal	S. P. Balasubrahmanyam
1988	Bharath	"Sukhada Jeevana"	Shankar-Ganesh	R. N. Jayagopal	S. P. Balasubrahmanyam
1988	Bharath	"Nammurina Hammeera Baa"	Shankar-Ganesh	R. N. Jayagopal	Solo
1988	Bhoomi Thayane	"Collegalli Odhorella"	Vijaya Bhaskar	Chi. Udayashankar	Rajkumar Bharathi
1988	Devatha Manushya	"Hrudayadali Idenidhu"	Upendra Kumar	Chi. Udayashankar	Dr. Rajkumar
1988	Ladies Hostel	"Ee Janumadinada"	Jathin Shyam	Mohammad Hasham	S. P. Balasubrahmanyam, Vani Jairam
1988	Mathru Vathsalya	"Baaro O Maava"	Shankar-Ganesh	Doddarange Gowda	Chorus
1988	Ganda Mane Makkalu	"Sarasavo Saligeyo"	Vijayanand	Chi. Udayashankar	Mano
1988	Ganda Mane Makkalu	"Namma Hosa Maneyantha"	Vijayanand	R. N. Jayagopal	Manohar, Dwarakish, Usha Ganesh
1988	Gudugu Sidilu	"Atthe Maga Thandu Kotta"	Vijaya Bhaskar	R. N. Jayagopal	B. R. Chaya
1988	Ranaranga	"Mussanjeli Nammuralli"	Hamsalekha	Hamsalekha	solo
1988	Ranaranga	"Muddu Muddu"	Hamsalekha	Hamsalekha	solo
1988	Sahasa Veera	"Yavvanave Balavayitu"	Satyam	Doddarange Gowda	Mano
1988	Chiranjeevi Sudhakara	"Vasantha Maasa"	Upendra Kumar	Chi. Udayashankar	Raghavendra Rajkumar
1988	Chiranjeevi Sudhakara	"Beratha Manase"	Upendra Kumar	Chi. Udayashankar	Raghavendra Rajkumar
1988	Chiranjeevi Sudhakara	"Modadha There"	Upendra Kumar	Chi. Udayashankar	Raghavendra Rajkumar
1988	Dharma Pathni	"Amma Amma"	Hamsalekha		Latha Hamsalekha
1988	Mathrudevobhava	"Hoi Ammanni"	Hamsalekha	V. Manohar	S. P. Balasubrahmanyam
1988	Mathrudevobhava	"Double Jedeya Billi"	Hamsalekha	Musuri Jagannath	S. P. Balasubrahmanyam
1988	Oorigitta Kolli	"Sankocha Bittu"	M. Ranga Rao	Vijaya Narasimha	Chorus
1988	Praja Prabhuthva	"Hennina Maimaata"	Shankar-Ganesh	Shyamsundar Kulkarni	B. R. Chaya
1988	Sangliyana	"Bandalo Bandalo Kanchana"	Hamsalekha	Hamsalekha	S. P. Balasubrahmanyam
1988	Sangliyana	"Doorada Oorininda"	Hamsalekha	Hamsalekha	S. P. Balasubrahmanyam, chorus
1988	Sangliyana	"Preethiyinda"	Hamsalekha	Doddarange Gowda	S. P. Balasubrahmanyam, B. R. Chaya
1988	Sangliyana	"Raja Nanna Raja"	Hamsalekha	V. Manohar	Shankar Nag
1988	Thayi Karulu	"Ee Jeevanave Sammohana"	Satyam	Vijaya Narasimha	Solo
1988	Thayigobba Karna	"Chinnada Gunada Annayya"	Vijaya Bhaskar	R. N. Jayagopal	S. P. Balasubrahmanyam
1989	Ade Raaga Ade Haadu	"Anuragada Hosa"	Shankar–Ganesh	Chi. Udaya Shankar	S. P. Balasubrahmanyam
1989	Ade Raaga Ade Haadu	"Manasali Ninthe"	Shankar–Ganesh	Chi. Udaya Shankar	S. P. Balasubrahmanyam
1989	Ade Raaga Ade Haadu	"Eleya Maradali"	Shankar–Ganesh	Chi. Udaya Shankar	Solo
1989	Avatara Purusha	"Ee Raatri"	Vijayanand		solo
1989	Avatara Purusha	"Prema Hrudayada"	Vijayanand		S. P. Balasubrahmanyam
1989	Bala Hombale	"Thangali Beesidaaga"	Upendra Kumar	Chi. Udayashankar	Mano
1989	Bala Hombale	"Aarigellige Aadeno"	Upendra Kumar	Chi. Udayashankar	Mano
1989	Bala Hombale	"Karedaru Baradiruve"	Upendra Kumar	Chi. Udayashankar	Solo
1989	Bangarada Baduku	"Sweet Boy Dream Boy"	Shankar-Ganesh	R. N. Jayagopal	Solo
1989	Bidisada Bandha	"Ayyo Papa"	M. Ranga Rao	R. N. Jayagopal	S. P. Balasubrahmanyam, Vani Jairam
1989	C.B.I. Shankar	"Vote For Vote For"	Hamsalekha		S. P. Balasubrahmanyam
1989	Doctor Krishna	"Doctor Krishnana"	Rajan-Nagendra	Chi. Udayashankar	Solo
1989	Doctor Krishna	"Doctorandre Doctor"	Rajan-Nagendra	Shyamasundar Kulkarni	S. P. Balasubrahmanyam
1989	En Swamy Aliyandre	"Daddy Daddy"	Shankar-Ganesh	R. N. Jayagopal	B. R. Chaya
1989	En Swamy Aliyandre	"Putta Hoova Mutti Nodo"	Shankar-Ganesh	R. N. Jayagopal	S. P. Balasubrahmanyam
1989	Gajapathi Garvabhanga	"Jataka Kudure"	Upendra Kumar	Sriranga	Solo
1989	Gajapathi Garvabhanga	"Hosa Ragavidu"	Upendra Kumar	Sriranga	Raghavendra Rajkumar
1989	Gajapathi Garvabhanga	"Olida Swaragalu"	Upendra Kumar	Chi. Udayashankar	Raghavendra Rajkumar, Kusuma, Madhusudhan
1989	Hosa Kavya	"Thayiyemba Devathe"	Shankar-Ganesh	R. N. Jayagopal	S. P. Balasubrahmanyam
1989	Hrudaya Samrajya	"Hallada Dande"	Gururaj (Sound of Music)	Sriranga	S. P. Balasubrahmanyam
1989	Hrudaya Samrajya	"Chingulabi Mooduvanthe"	Gururaj (Sound of Music)	Sriranga	S. P. Balasubrahmanyam
1989	Hrudaya Samrajya	"Kannu Mucchi"	Gururaj (Sound of Music)	Sriranga	Vishnu
1989	Indrajith	"Baari Suddiyallide"	Hamsalekha		Solo
1989	Inspector Vikram	"Thuntu Kannalli"	Vijayanand	Sriranga	S. P. Balasubrahmanyam
1989	Inspector Vikram	"Baa Ennalu Hatthira"	Vijayanand	Chi. Udayashankar	S. P. Balasubrahmanyam
1989	Jayabheri	"Aaseyagide"	Shankar-Ganesh	Ranganath	Mano
1989	Jayabheri	"Balli Naduvanu"	Shankar-Ganesh	Ranganath	Mano
1989	Kindari Jogi	"Ramana Bhanta"	Hamsalekha		Mano
1989	Love Maadi Nodu	"Bangalore Teenage Henne"	L. Vaidyanathan	V. Manohar	S. P. Balasubrahmanyam
1989	Love Maadi Nodu	"Love Madu Madi Nodu"	L. Vaidyanathan	V. Manohar	S. P. Balasubrahmanyam
1989	Love Maadi Nodu	"Ninna Nodo Aaseyali"	L. Vaidyanathan	V. Manohar	S. P. Balasubrahmanyam
1989	Mahayuddha	"Abhimanyu Abhimanyu"	Shankar-Ganesh	R. N. Jayagopal	Solo
1989	Mahayuddha	"Naa Yaaro"	Shankar-Ganesh	R. N. Jayagopal	S. P. Balasubrahmanyam
1989	Mahayuddha	"Melobba Tha Kelagilida"	Shankar-Ganesh	R. N. Jayagopal	Solo
1989	Manmatha Raja	"Katthalada Baalinalli"	Chakravarthy	Chi. Udayashankar	Mano, Vandemataram Srinivas, B. R. Chaya
1989	Manmatha Raja	"Majaa Balu Majaa"	Chakravarthy	Chi. Udayashankar	B. R. Chaya
1989	Mana Mecchida Sose	"Beda Raja Sankocha"	Upendra Kumar	Chi. Udaya Shankar	solo
1989	Mutthinantha Manushya	"Ananda Anandave"	Chakravarthy	Chi. Udayashankar	Mano, Rama Aravind
1989	Mutthinantha Manushya	"Thampaada Gaali"	Chakravarthy	Chi. Udayashankar	Mano
1989	Nanjundi Kalyana	"Olage Seridare Gundu"	Upendra Kumar	Bangi Ranga	solo
1989	Nanjundi Kalyana	"Nijava Nudiyale"	Upendra Kumar	Chi. Udayashankar	Raghavendra Rajkumar, Chorus
1989	Narasimha	"Aakashavaniyalli"	Hamsalekha	Hamsalekha	S. P. Balasubrahmanyam
1989	Narasimha	"Premavo Premavo"	Hamsalekha	Hamsalekha	S. P. Balasubrahmanyam
1989	Nyayakkagi Nanu	"Nanna Hesaru"	Satyam	R. N. Jayagopal	Vani Jairam
1989	Onti Salaga	"Baaro Huduga"	Hamsalekha		Chorus
1989	Padmavyuha	"Hosa Hudugi"	Yuvaraj	Sriranga	S. P. Balasubrahmanyam, Vani Jairam
1989	Padmavyuha	"I Want to Be"	Yuvaraj	Sriranga	S. P. Balasubrahmanyam, Vani Jairam
1989	Parashuram	"Thandana Thandana"	Hamsalekha	Hamsalekha	Dr. Rajkumar
1989	Parashuram	"Eleyali Mareyali"	Hamsalekha	Chi. Udayashankar	Solo
1989	Poli Huduga	"Yaaru Poli"	Hamsalekha		S. P. Balasubrahmanyam
1989	Raja Yuvaraja	"Sanje Baanige"	Vijayanand	R. N. Jayagopal	S. P. Balasubrahmanyam
1989	Raja Yuvaraja	"Naa Ninna Nodidaga"	Vijayanand	R. N. Jayagopal	S. P. Balasubrahmanyam
1989	Raja Yuvaraja	"Naane Raaja Neene Yuvaraja"	Vijayanand	R. N. Jayagopal	S. P. Balasubrahmanyam
1989	Raja Yuvaraja	"I Love You Endare"	Vijayanand	R. N. Jayagopal	S. P. Balasubrahmanyam
1989	Raja Yuvaraja	"Namasthesthu Maha"	Vijayanand	R. N. Jayagopal	Solo
1989	Rudra	"Nanna Thangi"	Amar	Shyamasundar Kulkarni	S. P. Balasubrahmanyam
1989	Samsara Nouke	"Maneya Belago"	M. Ranga Rao	Shyamsundar Kulkarni	S. P. Balasubrahmanyam
1989	Singari Bangari	"Chapala Chapala Chanchala"	Hamsalekha		Shivaraj
1989	Sura Sundaranga	"Baa Madhava"	Hamsalekha	Su. Rudramurthy Shastry	B. K. Sumitra, Kasthuri Shankar
1989	Thayigobba Tharle Maga	"Baarisu Thurike"	M. Ranga Rao	Shyamsundar Kulkarni	S. P. Balasubrahmanyam
1989	Thayigobba Tharle Maga	"Dum Dum Diga"	M. Ranga Rao	Shyamsundar Kulkarni	S. P. Balasubrahmanyam
1989	Yuddha Kanda	"Muddina Gini"	Hamsalekha		S. P. Balasubrahmanyam

== 1990s ==
Year	Film	Song	Composer(s)	Writer(s)	Co-singer(s)
1990	Aasegobba Meesegobba	"Baa Kuniva Thai Thai"	Upendra Kumar	Chi. Udayashankar	S. P. Balasubrahmanyam
1990	Aasegobba Meesegobba	"Thaanana Thandana"	Upendra Kumar	Chi. Udayashankar	Shiva Rajkumar
1990	Aata Bombata	"Ittaru Ittaru Guri Ittaru"	Hamsalekha		S. P. Balasubrahmanyam
1990	Aata Bombata	"Nodi Seereya Maaye"	Hamsalekha		Solo
1990	Anukoolakkobba Ganda	"Higgina Suggiyu"	Upendra Kumar	Sriranga	Raghavendra Rajkumar
1990	Anukoolakkobba Ganda	"Maleyinda Bhanu"	Upendra Kumar	Chi. Udayashankar	Raghavendra Rajkumar
1990	Anukoolakkobba Ganda	"Kempu Deepa"	Upendra Kumar	Chi. Udayashankar	G. S. Srinath, Kusuma, Raghavendra Rajkumar
1990	Ashoka Chakra	"Preethiya Marethu"	Manoranjan Prabhakar	Sriranga	Solo
1990	Ashoka Chakra	"Sangaathi Ninna Kande"	Manoranjan Prabhakar	Sriranga	S. P. Balasubrahmanyam
1990	Ashoka Chakra	"Hadona Ille"	Manoranjan Prabhakar	Sriranga	Ramesh Chandra
1990	Ashwamedha	"Yaako Eno"	Sangeetha Raja	Doddarange Gowda	S. P. Balasubrahmanyam
1990	Ashwamedha	"Ee Jaya Nimmade"	Sangeetha Raja	Doddarange Gowda	S. P. Balasubrahmanyam
1990	Ashwamedha	"ABCD Kalithare Neenu"	Sangeetha Raja	Doddarange Gowda	S. P. Balasubrahmanyam
1990	Ashwamedha	"Ee Jeevanave Santhosha"	Sangeetha Raja	Doddarange Gowda	Solo
1990	Baare Nanna Muddina Rani	"Gandanu Hadeda"	Rajan-Nagendra	Ra. Prakash Thrishuli	Solo
1990	Baare Nanna Muddina Rani	"Hennu Andarene"	Rajan-Nagendra	Su. Rudramurthy Shastry	Solo
1990	Baare Nanna Muddina Rani	"Henninindale Ella"	Rajan-Nagendra	Su. Rudramurthy Shastry	K. J. Yesudas
1990	Bhale Chathura	"Ele Hinde Kaayi"	Upendra Kumar	R. N. Jayagopal	Ramesh Chandra
1990	Bhale Chathura	"Banda Kane Rambo"	Upendra Kumar	R. N. Jayagopal	Solo
1990	Chakravarthy	"Babu I Love You"	Shankar-Ganesh	Chi. Udayashankar	Vani Jayaram
1990	Challenge	"O Ramaiah Baraiah"	Hamsalekha		S. P. Balasubrahmanyam
1990	Challenge	"Kesaru Kaiyige Mosaru"	Hamsalekha		Ramesh Chandra
1990	Hosa Jeevana	"Byadve Byadve"	Hamsalekha		S. P. Balasubrahmanyam
1990	Hosa Jeevana	"Laali Laali"	Hamsalekha		S. P. Balasubrahmanyam
1990	S. P. Sangliyana Part 2	"Ramaiah Ramaiah Nee	Hamsalekha		B. R. Chaya, Latha Hamsalekha
1990	S. P. Sangliyana Part 2	"Maiyella Kannidda Obba"	Hamsalekha		solo
1990	S. P. Sangliyana Part 2	"Ondu Muthinantha"	Hamsalekha		solo
1991	Durgasthami	"Thandano Thandano"	Shankar–Ganesh	N/A	solo
1991	Durgasthami	"Chandi Chaamundi"	Shankar–Ganesh	N/A	solo
1991	Durgasthami	"Alabeda Alabeda"	Shankar–Ganesh	N/A	solo
1991	Iduve Jeevana	"Jarda Beeda Haakidange"	Vijaya Bhaskar		S. P. Balasubrahmanyam
1991	Ranachandi	"Hididare Saarayi"	Sax Raja		solo
1991	Ranachandi	"Chinna Chinna"	Sax Raja		solo
1992	Agni Panjara	"Hoja Re Hoja"	Vijay Anand	N/A	solo
1992	Alli Ramachari Illi Brahmachari	"Beautiyalli Naa Angel"	V. Manohar	N/A	solo
1992	Amara Prema	"Beeravva Maaravva"	Upendra Kumar	N/A	S. P. Balasubrahmanyam
1992	Athi Madhura Anuraga	"Jenu Beke Jenu"	Hamsalekha		solo
1992	Baa Nanna Preethisu	"Andu Ninna Kandaagale"	Rajan–Nagendra	N/A	S. P. Balasubrahmanyam
1992	Baa Nanna Preethisu	"Manadaase Nooru"	Rajan–Nagendra	N/A	S. P. Balasubrahmanyam
1992	Baa Nanna Preethisu	"Ondu Beku Eradu Saaku"	Rajan–Nagendra	N/A	S. P. Balasubrahmanyam
1992	Banni Ondsala Nodi	"Elli Nodadalli"	Upendra Kumar	M. D. Hasham	S. P. Balasubrahmanyam
1992	Banni Ondsala Nodi	"Baaro Priya Baaro"	Upendra Kumar	M. D. Hasham	solo
1992	Belli Kalungura	"Me Ladki Ladki"	Hamsalekha		solo
1992	Bhanda Nanna Ganda	"Preethiya Theranu"	V. Manohar	N/A	L. N. Shastri
1992	Bharjari Gandu	"Duddina Jambhada Koli"	Upendra Kumar	N/A	Raghavendra Rajkumar
1992	Bharjari Gandu	"Mai Touchchdare"	Upendra Kumar	N/A	Raghavendra Rajkumar
1992	Bharjari Gandu	"Aakashave Vandane"	Upendra Kumar	N/A	Raghavendra Rajkumar
1992	Bharjari Gandu	"Yamma Yamma Yellaru"	Upendra Kumar	N/A	Solo
1992	Bombat Hendthi	"Love Love"	Upendra Kumar	R. N. Jayagopal	S. P. Balasubrahmanyam
1992	Chaitrada Premanjali	"Daari Bidu"	Hamsalekha	Hamsalekha	solo
1992	Chaitrada Premanjali	"Nannavare Nanage"	Hamsalekha	Hamsalekha	S. P. Balasubrahmanyam
1992	Chitralekha	"Hennandare Ramayana"	Hamsalekha		solo
1992	Edurmaneli Ganda Pakkadmaneli Hendthi	"Ammayya Ammayya"	Raj–Koti	R. N. Jayagopal	S. P. Balasubrahmanyam
1992	Edurmaneli Ganda Pakkadmaneli Hendthi	"Kannu Bitthu"	Raj–Koti	R. N. Jayagopal	S. P. Balasubrahmanyam
1992	Edurmaneli Ganda Pakkadmaneli Hendthi	"Ek Do Teen"	Raj–Koti	R. N. Jayagopal	S. P. Balasubrahmanyam
1992	Entede Bhanta	! Utta Batteyali"	Hamsalekha	Hamsalekha	S. P. Balasubrahmanyam
1992	Entede Bhanta	"Hunnimeya Rathrige"	Hamsalekha	Hamsalekha	S. P. Balasubrahmanyam
1992	Entede Bhanta	"Entende Bhanta"	Hamsalekha	Hamsalekha	solo
1992	Gili Bete	"Tangaali Maiyya"	Manoranjan Prabhakar	N/A	S. P. Balasubrahmanyam
1992	Gharshane	"Olage Seridare Gundu -(Remix)	Upendra Kumar	N/A	solo
1992	Gruhalakshmi	"Nanna Ganda Brahmachari"	Raj–Koti		solo
1992	Guru Brahma	"Hetthu Hotthu Mutthu"	Hamsalekha		K. J. Yesudas, Mano
1992	Hatamari Hennu Kiladi Gandu	"Rammina Mattige"	Rajan–Nagendra	Chi. Udaya Shankar	solo
1992	Tharle Nan Maga	"Ninna Ninna Jadsi Odithini"	V. Manohar	Upendra	Jaggesh
1992	Hosa Kalla Hale Kulla	"Jagarane Jagarane"	Hamsalekha		Mano
1992	Hosa Kalla Hale Kulla	"Mutthunantha Hudugi"	Hamsalekha		Rajesh Krishnan
1992	Jeevana Chaitra	"Ninna Chelava Vadana"	Upendra Kumar	Chi. Udayashankar	Rajkumar
1992	Jeevana Chaitra	"Lakshmi Baaramma"	Upendra Kumar	Chi. Udayashankar	Rajkumar
1992	Kanasina Rani	"Onti Kaalinalina"	Upendra Kumar	N/A	solo
1992	Kanasina Rani	"Nudigalu Mutthanthe"	Upendra Kumar	N/A	L. N. Shastry
1992	Kanasina Rani	"Ninna Nodidaagale"	Upendra Kumar	N/A	L. N. Shastry
1992	Malashree Mamashree	"Yaarigu Thalethaggisabeda"	Raj–Koti	R. N. Jayagopal	Chandrika Gururaj
1992	Malashree Mamashree	"Baaro Nanna"	Raj–Koti	R. N. Jayagopal	Chandrika Gururaj, S. P. Balasubrahmanyam
1992	Mana Gedda Maga	"Matthu Eri Chittha Ella"	L. Vaidyanathan	Vijaya Narasimha	Rajkumar Bharathi
1992	Mana Gedda Maga	"Sogasaagide"	L. Vaidyanathan	N/A	chorus
1992	Super Nanna Maga	"Baarayya Sanjege"	V. Manohar		Jaggesh
1992	Super Nanna Maga	"Priya Priya"	V. Manohar		L. N. Shastri
1992	Mallige Hoove	"Prayave Vandane"	Hamsalekha		Ramesh
1992	Mannina Doni	"Theme Humming"	Hamsalekha		solo
1992	Marana Mrudanga	"Dava Dava"	Hamsalekha	Hamsalekha	S. P. Balasubrahmanyam
1992	Marana Mrudanga	"Delhiyagali Halliyagali"	Hamsalekha	Hamsalekha	S. P. Balasubrahmanyam
1992	Marana Mrudanga	"Bhoomi Aakasha"	Hamsalekha	Hamsalekha	S. P. Balasubrahmanyam
1992	Marana Mrudanga	"Ko Ko Yee Andha"	Hamsalekha	Hamsalekha	solo
1992	Mavanige Thakka Aliya	"Kannalli Neenu"	Shankar–Ganesh	N/A	S. P. Balasubrahmanyam
1992	Megha Mandara	"Thayi Kaanada"	S. P. Venkatesh	Doddarange Gowda	solo
1992	Midida Shruthi	"Aa Surya Chandra	Upendra Kumar	M. N. Vyasa Rao	S. P. Balasubrahmanyam
1992	Midida Shruthi	"Yaavudu Preethi"	Upendra Kumar	M. N. Vyasa Rao	S. P. Balasubrahmanyam
1992	Midida Shruthi	"Nanna Ninna Aase"	Upendra Kumar	Geethapriya	S. P. Balasubrahmanyam
1992	Midida Shruthi	"Bannada Okuli"	Upendra Kumar	Sri Ranga	S. P. Balasubrahmanyam
1992	Mysore Jaana	"Hero Handsome Hero"	Rajan–Nagendra	R. N. Jayagopal	S. P. Balasubrahmanyam
1992	Mysore Jaana	"Snehada Sanketavagi"	Rajan–Nagendra	R. N. Jayagopal	S. P. Balasubrahmanyam
1992	Mysore Jaana	"Allaudin Chiragu Thande"	Rajan–Nagendra	R. N. Jayagopal	S. P. Balasubrahmanyam
1992	Nanjunda	"Sontava Hidibyada"	Raj Mohan	N/A	solo
1992	Nanjunda	"Kaaduthaithe Beduthaithe"	Raj Mohan	N/A	Vinod Raj
1992	Nanjunda	"Nammoornag Nanobne Jaana"	Raj Mohan	N/A	Mano
1992	Nanna Thangi	"Alli Illi	Hamsalekha		B. R. Chhaya
1992	Nanna Thangi	"Kotta Kotta"	Hamsalekha		Manjula Gururaj
1992	Obbarigintha Obbaru	"Bangari Nanna Aane"	S. A. Rajkumar		S. P. Balasubrahmanyam
1992	Obbarigintha Obbaru	"Salaamu Haakuve"	S. A. Rajkumar		S. P. Balasubrahmanyam, S. Aman
1992	Obbarigintha Obbaru	"Kaala Bathappa"	S. A. Rajkumar		B. R. Chaya
1992	Ondu Cinema Kathe	"Ondu Mutthu"	Rajan–Nagendra	Chi. Udaya Shankar	Narasimha Nayak
1992	Police File	"Kanaka Kanaka O Kanaka"	Hamsalekha		S. P. Balasubrahmanyam
1992	Pranayada Pakshigalu	"Kareya Aalisi"	Manoranjan Prabhakar	Mahendar	solo
1992	Pranayada Pakshigalu	"Gundina Matthali Pranayada"	Manoranjan Prabhakar	V. Manohar	Narasimha Nayak
1992	Pranayada Pakshigalu	"Baanaadi Ninagagi Kaade"	Manoranjan Prabhakar	M. N. Vyasa Rao	K. J. Yesudas
1992	Pranayada Pakshigalu	"Jum Jum Maiyalli"	Manoranjan Prabhakar	Vijaya Narasimha	K. J. Yesudas
1992	Prema Sangama	"Muddala Mogadalli"	Rajan–Nagendra	Chi. Udaya Shankar, Su. Rudramurthy Shastry, Shyamsundar Kulkarni and Sri Raga	solo
1992	Prema Sangama	"Nanna Jodi Neenu"	Rajan–Nagendra	Chi. Udaya Shankar, Su. Rudramurthy Shastry, Shyamsundar Kulkarni and Sri Raga	S. P. Balasubrahmanyam
1992	Prema Sangama	"Preethi I Love You"	Rajan–Nagendra	Chi. Udaya Shankar, Su. Rudramurthy Shastry, Shyamsundar Kulkarni and Sri Raga	S. P. Balasubrahmanyam
1992	Purushotthama	"Madhuvade Neenu"	Hamsalekha	Hamsalekha	S. P. Balasubrahmanyam
1992	Purushotthama	"Supero Supero Hudugi	Hamsalekha	Hamsalekha	S. P. Balasubrahmanyam, K. S. Chithra
1992	Purushotthama	"Kanchana Kanchana"	Hamsalekha	Hamsalekha	Shiva Rajkumar
1992	Putta Hendthi	"Putta Hendathi Naanu"	Vijaya Bhaskar		Vishnu
1992	Putta Hendthi	"Ninna Ratte Yaako"	Vijaya Bhaskar		Vishnu
1992	Putta Hendthi	"Kaadolagondu"	Vijaya Bhaskar		
1992	Rajadhiraja	"Yerida Gunginalli"	Vijayanand		solo
1992	Sahasi	"Hasiru Baliya Kesari Jhanda" (female)	Hamsalekha	Hamsalekha	solo
1992	Sangya Balya	"Chiguru Meeseya Theedi"	Vijaya Bhaskar	N/A	solo
1992	Sangya Balya	"Haniki Nodutha"	Vijaya Bhaskar	N/A	Yashavanth Halibandi
1992	Saptapadi	"Chinna Nanna"	Upendra Kumar	Chi. Udaya Shankar	S. P. Balasubrahmanyam
1992	Saptapadi	"Koneyalli Mancha"	Upendra Kumar	Chi. Udaya Shankar	S. P. Balasubrahmanyam
1992	Saptapadi	"Karune Thorisamma"	Upendra Kumar	Chi. Udaya Shankar	Sangeetha Katti
1992	Shambhavi	"Nee Nanna Muttale Beku"	Shankar–Ganesh		Vishnu
1992	Solillada Saradara	"Premavendarenu Helabaradenu"	Hamsalekha	Hamsalekha	K. S. Chithra
1992	Solillada Saradara	"Yaarigaagi Hele"	Hamsalekha	Hamsalekha	K. S. Chithra
1992	Soori	"Khaaki Bante Maavayya"	Raj–Koti	N/A	S. P. Balasubrahmanyam
1992	Soori	"Hero Maro Bannor"	Raj–Koti	N/A	S. P. Balasubrahmanyam
1992	Soori	"Maharaaya Bande Neenu"	Raj–Koti	N/A	S. P. Balasubrahmanyam
1992	Soori	"Hai Bhaja Govinda"	Raj–Koti	N/A	S. P. Balasubrahmanyam
1992	Vajrayudha	"Jagavuraluthide"	Hamsalekha	Hamsalekha	solo
1993	Mangalya Bandhana	"Sanjeyu Bandaithu"	Hamsalekha	Hamsalekha	solo
1993	Mangalya Bandhana	"Nodu Nannomme"	Hamsalekha	Hamsalekha	solo
1993	Kalyana Rekhe	"Kalyana Rekhe"	Hamsalekha	Hamsalekha	S. P. Balasubrahmanyam
1993	Kalyana Rekhe	"O Chaitra Nee"	Hamsalekha	Hamsalekha	S. P. Balasubrahmanyam
1993	Kalyana Rekhe	"Oh Maina Oh Sakhi"	Hamsalekha	Hamsalekha	S. P. Balasubrahmanyam
1993	Kalyana Rekhe	"Nagundare Aluthaale"	Hamsalekha	Hamsalekha	solo
1993	Kalyana Rekhe	"Markitanalli"	Hamsalekha	Hamsalekha	Rajesh Krishnan
1994	Kunthi Puthra	"Dinga Danga Dinga"	Vijayanand	N/A	solo
1995	Bangarada Kalasha	"Samsaaravendare"	Rajan–Nagendra	Chi. Udaya Shankar	Sangeetha Katti, S. P. Balasubrahmanyam
1995	Bategaara	"Konda Maamudu"	Sadhu Kokila	N/A	Mano
1995	Bategaara	"Rambha Athiloka Swarga"	Sadhu Kokila	N/A	Mano
1995	Gadibidi Aliya	"Umma Beku Sai"	Koti	R. N. Jayagopal	Rajesh Krishnan, Sangeetha Katti
1995	Gadibidi Aliya	"Rama Rasave"	Koti	R. N. Jayagopal	S. P. Balasubrahmanyam
1995	Bombat Raja Bandal Rani	"Katthari Haako"	Raj Mohan	Sri Ranga	S. P. Balasubrahmanyam
1995	Bombat Raja Bandal Rani	"Minchuganna Sanchugaathi"	Raj Mohan	Sri Ranga	S. P. Balasubrahmanyam
1995	Hello Sister	"Premakke Crazy"	Koti	N/A	S. P. Balasubrahmanyam
1995	Hello Sister	"Maama Matashu"	Koti	N/A	S. P. Balasubrahmanyam
1995	Hello Sister	"Hello Sister"	Koti	N/A	Rajesh Krishnan, S. P. Balasubrahmanyam
1995	Hello Sister	"Kalli Kalli"	Koti	N/A	Rajesh Krishnan
1995	Kalyanotsava	"Preethi Maaro Hudugara"	Hamsalekha	Hamsalekha	S. P. Balasubrahmanyam
1995	Kalyanotsava	"Bannada Chitteya"	Hamsalekha	Hamsalekha	S. P. Balasubrahmanyam
1995	Killer Diary	"Ammamma Enu"	Vijayanand		solo
1995	Samara	"Ide Dim Dima"	Kousthuba	Hamsalekha	solo
1995	Savyasachi	"Ee Hrudayada Haadu"	Sadhu Kokila	M. N. Vyasa Rao	solo
1995	Thumbida Mane	"Hatthira Hatthira"	Upendra Kumar	M. D. Hashim	S. P. Balasubrahmanyam
1995	Thumbida Mane	"Phalisithu Premada"	Upendra Kumar	M. D. Hashim	S. P. Balasubrahmanyam
1995	Yama Kinkara	"Dharmada Devane"	Rajan–Nagendra	N/A	solo
1996	Annavra Makkalu	"Baaro Baaro Ninna Shiva"	Rajesh Ramanath	N/A	solo
1996	Nammoora Mandara Hoove	"Manadaase Hakkiyaagi"	Ilaiyaraaja	Doddarangegowda	S. P. Balasubrahmanyam
1996	Anuraga Devathe	"Sooryanaane Chandranaane"	Shankar	N/A	S. P. Balasubrahmanyam
1996	Anuraga Devathe	"Chaitrada Maavu"	Shankar	N/A	S. P. Balasubrahmanyam
1996	Anuraga Devathe	"Preethi Deepa Neenade"	Shankar	N/A	S. P. Balasubrahmanyam
1996	Arishina Kumkuma	"Namma Samsara Ananda Sagara"	V. Manohar	V. Manohar	G. V. Atri
1996	Arishina Kumkuma	"Namma Samsara"	V. Manohar	V. Manohar	Master Rakesh, Master Chethan
1996	Circle Inspector	"Urmila Urmila"	Hamsalekha		Mano
1996	Gaaya	"Yaavudo Oorinalli"	M. M. Keeravani	V. Manohar	Malgudi Subha
1996	Geluvina Saradara	"Tamota Tamota"	Hamsalekha	Hamsalekha	Raghavendra Rajkumar
1996	Geluvina Saradara	"Innu Yaaka Nachkothiye"	Hamsalekha	Hamsalekha	Raghavendra Rajkumar
1996	Geluvina Saradara	"Premakke Kannilla"	Hamsalekha	Hamsalekha	Mano
1996	Geluvina Saradara	"Love Lockup"	Hamsalekha	Hamsalekha	Mano
1996	Huliya	"Banna Bannadaramane"	Sadhu Kokila	Sri Ranga	Rajesh Krishnan
1996	Ibbara Naduve Muddina Aata	"Kattiruve Kachhithu"	Sadhu Kokila	V. Manohar	Mano
1996	Janumada Jodi	"Janumada Jodi Neenu"	V. Manohar	Doddarange Gowda	Rajesh Krishnan
1996	Janumada Jodi	"Aarathi Annammange"	V. Manohar	Doddarange Gowda	Rajesh Krishnan
1996	Janumada Jodi	"Ivanyara Magano"	V. Manohar	V. Manohar	Rajesh Krishnan
1996	Janumada Jodi	"Mani Mani Mani"	V. Manohar	V. Manohar	Shiva Rajkumar
1996	Janumada Jodi	"O Oora Dyaavre"	V. Manohar	V. Manohar	solo
1996	Jeevanadhi	"Sheshadri Vasa"	Koti	R. N. Jayagopal	Rajesh Krishnan
1996	Jeevanadhi	"Daivada Karuneyu"	Koti	R. N. Jayagopal	Rajesh Krishnan
1996	Kempu Mugilu	"Sundara Sundara"	Sadhu Kokila	Doddarange Gowda	S. P. Balasubrahmanyam
1996	Kempu Mugilu	"Preethi Maathanadorella"	Sadhu Kokila	V. Manohar	S. P. Balasubrahmanyam
1996	Minugu Thare	"Sogasu Sogasada Sneha"	Rajesh Ramanath	Sri Ranga	K. S. Chithra
1996	Minugu Thare	"Preethi Jagadalli"	Rajesh Ramanath	Sri Ranga	Sowmya
1996	Muddina Aliya	"Jagavidi Milanothsava"	V. Manohar		S. P. Balasubrahmanyam
1996	Muddina Sose	"Ee Balina Sagaradali"	Upendra Kumar	R. N. Jayagopal	Sangeetha Katti
1996	Nirbandha	"Dasara Naada Siriye"	Rajesh Ramanath	R. N. Jayagopal	S. P. Balasubrahmanyam
1996	Pattanakke Banda Putta	"Puttana Kattikolle"	V. Manohar	V. Manohar	Rajesh Krishnan
1996	Pattanakke Banda Putta	"Haalamma Haalamma"	V. Manohar	V. Manohar	S. P. Balasubrahmanyam
1996	Pattanakke Banda Putta	"Kannamuchhale"	V. Manohar	V. Manohar	solo
1996	Prema Sethuve	"Jhumtharara Jhumtha"	V. Manohar	V. Manohar	G. V. Atri
1996	Prema Sethuve	"Nee Nanna Naa Ninna"	V. Manohar	V. Manohar	G. V. Atri
1996	Rambha Rajyadalli Rowdy	"Baa Raja Baa"	Upendra Kumar	Rudrani Raj	solo
1996	Samayakkondu Sullu	"Latestu Modellu"	Upendra Kumar	R. N. Jayagopal	S. P. Balasubrahmanyam, Kusuma
1996	Samayakkondu Sullu	"Yuddha Mahayuddha"	Upendra Kumar	R. N. Jayagopal	S. P. Balasubrahmanyam
1996	Samayakkondu Sullu	"Latestu Modellu"	Upendra Kumar	R. N. Jayagopal	solo
1996	Soma	"Tharegala Thare"	Sadhu Kokila	K. Kalyan	Mano
1996	Soma	"Lalugu Lalugu"	Sadhu Kokila	K. Kalyan	Mano
1996	Soothradhara	"Athi Madhura"	Hamsalekha	Hamsalekha	Raghavendra Rajkumar
1996	Soothradhara	"Enu Sukha"	Hamsalekha	Hamsalekha	Raghavendra Rajkumar
1996	Soothradhara	"Anthu Inthu"	Hamsalekha	Hamsalekha	Raghavendra Rajkumar
1996	Sthree	"Hello Brahmachari"	Hamsalekha	Hamsalekha	solo
1996	Sthree	"Hennu Honnu"	Hamsalekha	Hamsalekha	solo

== 2000–present ==
Year	Film	Song	Composer(s)	Writer(s)	Co-singer(s)
2000	Miss California	Jaanu Oh Jaanu"			
2013	Shravani Subramanya	"Aakalbenne"	V. Harikrishna	V. Nagendra Prasad	Krishne Gowda
2014	Gharshane	"Olage Seridare Gundu" (remix)	Upendra Kumar	Bangi Ranga	solo
2015	Shree Rama Parandhama	"Seetharama Kalyanotsava"	Mohan Raj	N/A	solo

== Tamil songs ==
Year	Film	Song	Composer(s)	Writer(s)	Co-singer(s)
1984	Nallavanukku Nallavan	"Unnai Thaane"	Ilayaraja		K. J. Yesudas
1981	Aaradhanai	Ilam pani thuli	Ilayaraja		

== Telugu songs ==
Year	Film	Song	Composer(s)	Writer(s)	Co-singer(s)
1990	Mahajananiki Maradalu Pilla	"Koka Thadipina"	Upendra Kumar	Bhavana Chandra	Manjula Gururaj
1990	Mahajananiki Maradalu Pilla	"Thappa Thagithe"	Upendra Kumar	Bhavana Chandra	solo
