= Sri Vajreshwari Combines =

Indian film distribution and production company

- Type: Private Limited company
- Industry: Motion pictures
- Founded: 1975
- Founder: Parvathamma Rajkumar
- Headquarters: Bangalore, India
- Key people: Raghavendra Rajkumar
- Products: Film production
- Services: Film production
- Subsidiaries: Dakshayini Combines, Poornima Enterprises

Sri Vajreshwari Combines is an Indian film distribution and production company working primarily in Kannada cinema, based in Bengaluru. It was founded by Parvathamma Rajkumar. It is considered one of the hugely popular production companies of Kannada film industry. The company has produced over 87 films starring Dr. Rajkumar and his sons Shivarajkumar, Raghavendra Rajkumar and Puneeth Rajkumar.

== History ==
Sri Vajreshwari Combines was founded in 1975 in Hubli. The company was named after their family deity of same name suggested by Rajkumar's family friend.

The first film the company produced and distributed was Thrimurthy (1975) which became hugely successful at box-office.

The company's office was originally located nearby Santhosh hotel then later shifted at 6th Cross at Gandhinagar, Bengaluru where it is "well known for the various film production companies it houses". The road was renamed as Vajreshwari Road in 2017.

The company produced Om (1995) which gained Limca Book of Record for re-releasing more than 550 times.

== Filmography ==
Year	Title	Director	Cast
1975	Thrimurthy	C. V. Rajendran	Dr. Rajkumar
1990	Mruthyunjaya	Chi. Dattaraj	Shivarajkumar, Shashikumar
1995	Om	Upendra	Shivarajkumar, Prema
2005	Aakash		Puneeth Rajkumar
2008	Vamshi		Puneeth Rajkumar
2012	Yaare Koogadali	Samuthirakani	Puneeth Rajkumar
2016	Run Antony		Vinay Rajkumar
