= Chiranjeevi Sudhakar =

Indian Kannada-language, romantic drama film

- Directed by: Singeetham Srinivasa Rao
- Written by: Singeetham Srinivasa Rao
- Produced by: Parvathamma Rajkumar
- Starring: Raghavendra Rajkumar; Monisha Unni; Shashikumar
- Cinematography: V. K. Kannan
- Edited by: P. Bhaktavatasalam
- Music by: Upendra Kumar
- Production company: Dakshayini Combines
- Distributed by: Poornima Enterprises
- Release date: 2 September 1988
- Running time: 147 mins
- Country: India
- Language: Kannada

Chiranjeevi Sudhakar is a 1988 Kannada-language, romantic drama film written and directed by Singeetham Srinivasa Rao. Produced by Parvathamma Rajkumar, the film stars Raghavendra Rajkumar in his lead debut, along with Monisha Unni in her Kannada debut. Shashikumar, Balaraj, Kanchana, Thoogudeepa Srinivas and Vanitha Vasu play key supporting roles. The music is composed by Upendra Kumar.

== Cast ==
- Raghavendra Rajkumar as Sudhakar
- Monisha Unni as Sandhya and Sarala (dual role)
- Shashikumar as Avinash
- Balaraj
- Vanitha Vasu
- Thoogudeepa Srinivas
- Shivaram
- Kanchana
- Girija Lokesh
- Vaishali Kasaravalli
- Anjali
- Brahmavar
- Sathyabhama
- Sithara
- Go Ra Bheemarao
- Bhatti Mahadevappa

== Production ==
The film marked the lead debut of Raghavendra Rajkumar and the debut of Shashikumar.

== Soundtrack ==
Chiranjeevi Sudhakar

Film score by Upendra Kumar
- Released: 2 September 1988
- Genre: Soundtrack
- Length: 16:34
- Producer: Upendra Kumar

Music composed by Upendra Kumar.

S. No.	Song title	Lyrics	Singers	length
1	"Geluve Geluve"	Chi. Udayashankar	Raghavendra Rajkumar	4:54
2	"Vasantha Maasa"	Chi. Udayashankar	Raghavendra Rajkumar, Manjula Gururaj	4:44
3	"Modada There"	Chi. Udayashankar	Raghavendra Rajkumar	3:34
4	"Beratha Manase"	Chi. Udayashankar	Raghavendra Rajkumar, Manjula Gururaj	4.03

== Box office ==
The film did not do well at the box office although it established Raghavendra Rajkumar as an actor.
