= Sagara Deepa =

1994 Kannada film directed by T. S. Nagabharana

Sagara Deepa ಸಾಗರ ದೀಪ
- Directed by: T. S. Nagabharana
- Written by: Pal Sudarshan (Dialogues)
- Screenplay by: T. S. Nagabharana
- Story by: M. Veerappa moyili
- Produced by: Suresh Kumar
- Starring: Raghavendra Rajkumar; Supriya; Sribharati; Vajramuni; Srinath
- Cinematography: B. C. Gowrishankar
- Edited by: T. Shashi kumar
- Music by: Upendra Kumar
- Production company: S. P. R. Combines
- Distributed by: Bahar Films
- Release date: 1994
- Running time: 132 minutes
- Country: India
- Language: Kannada

Sagara Deepa (transl. Ocean Lamp) is a 1994 Kannada-language action drama film directed by T. S. Nagabharana who also wrote the screenplay for a novel by former Chief Minister of Karnataka, M. Veerappa Moily in 1986.

The film stars Raghavendra Rajkumar in the role of Kumar, a young man who disturbed by the plight of fishermen sets out to free them from exploitation by a middleman Bantappa played by Vajramuni. Sripriya, Sribharati, Srinath, M. S. Umesh and Honnavalli Krishna played other key roles.

The film was produced by Suresh Kumar under S. P. R. Combines. The film has musical score by Upendra Kumar.

== Cast ==
- Raghavendra Rajkumar as Kumar
- Vajramuni as Bantappa
- Supriya
- Sribharati
- Srinath
- M. S. Umesh
- Honnavalli Krishna
- Balaraj
