= Navibbaru Namagibbaru =

Indian Kannada-language, comedy drama film

- Directed by: M. S. Rajashekar
- Written by: T. N. Narasimhan
- Produced by: Parvathamma Rajkumar; Puneeth Rajkumar
- Starring: Raghavendra Rajkumar; Malashri; Subhashri
- Cinematography: R. Madhusudhan
- Edited by: T. Shashikumar
- Music by: Upendra Kumar
- Production company: Anjana Enterprises
- Distributed by: Poornima Enterprises
- Release date: 10 November 1993
- Running time: 147 mins
- Country: India
- Language: Kannada

Navibbaru Namagibbaru is a 1993 Kannada-language, comedy drama film written by T. N. Narasimhan, directed by M. S. Rajashekar and produced by Puneeth Rajkumar. It stars Raghavendra Rajkumar in dual roles, along with Malashri and Subhashri. K. S. Ashwath, Jayanthi, Dheerendra Gopal and Doddanna play supporting roles. The music is composed by Upendra Kumar. The film was a box office success.

== Cast ==
- Raghavendra Rajkumar in dual roles
- Malashri
- Subhashri (credited as Padmashree)
- Jayanthi
- K. S. Ashwath
- Dheerendra Gopal
- Doddanna
- Pandari Bai
- Shivakumar
- Lakshmi Bhat
- Ashwath Narayan
- Bheema Rao
- Honnavalli Krishna
- Nataraj
- Master Vinay Raghavendra
- M. S. Umesh

== Soundtrack ==
Navibbaru Namagibbaru

Film score by Upendra Kumar
- Released: 1993
- Genre: Soundtrack
- Length: 23:46
- Producer: Upendra Kumar

Music composed by Upendra Kumar.

| S. No. | Song title | Lyrics | Singers | length |
|---|---|---|---|---|
| 1 | "Andadalli Mindiruva" | Geethapriya | Raghavendra Rajkumar | 4:54 |
| 2 | "Shringeri Sharadakka" | Hamsalekha | Raghavendra Rajkumar, Sangeetha Katti | 4:44 |
| 3 | "Ninna Anda Nodidanthe" | Chi. Udayashankar | Raghavendra Rajkumar | 3:34 |
| 4 | "Yavudu Ee Bandha" | M. N. Vyasa Rao | Raghavendra Rajkumar, Sangeetha Katti | 3:55 |
| 5 | "Mai Gada Gada Naduguva" | Sri Ranga | Dr. Rajkumar | 4.05 |
| 6 | "Navibbaru Namagibbaru" | Chi. Udayashankar | Raghavendra Rajkumar | 4.03 |
