= Bharjari Gandu =

Indian Kannada-language, romantic drama film

- Directed by: Renuka Sharma
- Written by: T. N. Narasimhan
- Produced by: Lakshmi Govindraj
- Starring: Raghavendra Rajkumar; Roopashree; Lokesh
- Cinematography: V. K. Kannan
- Edited by: S. Manohar
- Music by: Upendra Kumar
- Production company: Sri Bhavani Combines
- Distributed by: Poornima Enterprises
- Release date: 29 September 1992
- Running time: 139 mins
- Country: India
- Language: Kannada

Bharjari Gandu is a 1992 Kannada-language, romantic drama film directed by Renuka Sharma and written by T. N. Narasimhan. The film stars Raghavendra Rajkumar and Roopashree in lead roles. Produced under Sri Bhavani Combines banner, the film also stars Lokesh, Srinath, Thoogudeepa Srinivas and Sudheer in key supporting roles. The film's music is composed by Upendra Kumar.

== Cast ==
- Raghavendra Rajkumar as Gopi
- Roopashree
- Lokesh
- Srinath
- Doddanna
- Thoogudeepa Srinivas
- Sudheer
- Sundar Krishna Urs
- Girija Lokesh
- Honnavalli Krishna
- Tennis Krishna
- Bank Janardhan
- Mandeep Roy
- Ashalatha
- Sundarashree
- Sithara
- Go Ra Bheemarao
- Latha
- Venu
- Mico Seetharam

== Soundtrack ==
Bharjari Gandu

Film score by Upendra Kumar
- Released: 1992
- Genre: Soundtrack
- Length: 18:24
- Producer: Upendra Kumar

The film's music is composed by Upendra Kumar.

S. No.	Song title	Lyrics	Singers	length
1	"Bottle Haaki"	Sri Ranga	Raghavendra Rajkumar, Lokesh	4:54
2	"Duddina Jambhada Koli"	Sri Ranga	Raghavendra Rajkumar, Manjula Gururaj	4:44
3	"Aakashave Vandane"	M. N. Vyasa Rao	Raghavendra Rajkumar, Manjula Gururaj	3:34
4	"Mai Touchchadare"	Sri Ranga	Raghavendra Rajkumar, Manjula Gururaj	4.03
5	"Yamma Yamma"	Sri Ranga	Manjula Gururaj	3:46
