= Rajatantra =

- Official poster
- Directed by: PVR Swamy Googaredoddi
- Written by: J. M. Prahalad
- Produced by: P. R. Sridhar; J. M. Prahalad; H. Vijaybhaskar
- Starring: Raghavendra Rajkumar
- Cinematography: PVR Swamy Googaredoddi
- Edited by: Nagesh N
- Music by: Sri Suresh
- Production company: Wishvam Digital Media PVT LTD
- Release date: 1 January 2021
- Country: India
- Language: Kannada

Rajatantra is a 2021 Indian Kannada-language film directed by PVR Swamy in his directorial debut. The film stars Raghavendra Rajkumar. P.V.R. Swamy previously worked as a cinematographer for Raghavendra Rajkumar's Ammana Mane (2019). The film was the first release of 2021.

== Cast ==
- Raghavendra Rajkumar as Captain Rajaram
- Bhavya
- Doddanna as the home minister
- Srinivasa Murthy as the chief minister
- Shankar Ashwath
- Neenasam Ashwath
- Muni
- Ranjan Hassan
- B. Shivananda
- Prathap Simha
- Herambha
- Praveen
- Vallabh Suri
- Venkatesh Prasad
- H. Vijayabhaskar

The flashback scene from Dr. Rajkumar's Parashuram (1989) is used in the film.

== Production ==
Raghavendra Rajkumar was cast as an army veteran. The film was shot in Bengaluru, Madikeri, Mysuru, and Nelamangala. Rajatantra was entirely made during the COVID-19 pandemic.

== Reception ==
A. Sharadhaa of The New Indian Express opined that "Raghavendra Rajkumar, in his role as a retired military officer, lifts up this jumbled drama that deals with immorality in society". Sunayana Suresh of The Times of India called the film an "amateurish attempt". Vijaya Karnataka praised the performances of the cast.
