= Raghavendra Rajkumar =

Indian actor, singer and producer

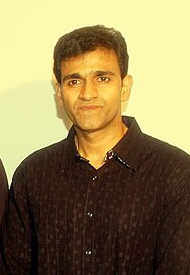
- Raghavendra Rajkumar in late 90s
- Born: 15 August 1965 (age 61); Madras, Madras State (now in Tamil Nadu), India
- Other name: Raganna
- Occupations: Actor, dancer, film producer, playback singer
- Years active: 1974–present
- Spouse: Mangala
- Children: Vinay Rajkumar, Yuva Rajkumar
- Parent(s): Dr. Rajkumar (father); Parvathamma (mother)
- Relatives: See Rajkumar family

Raghavendra Rajkumar (born 15 August 1965) is an Indian actor, singer and producer of Kannada cinema. He is the son of actor Dr. Rajkumar and film producer Parvathamma Rajkumar. He made his debut as a lead in the film Chiranjeevi Sudhakar (1988) before appearing in the successful 1989 film Nanjundi Kalyana. He went on to star in films such as Gajapathi Garvabhanga (1989), Anukoolakkobba Ganda (1990), and Geluvina Saradaara (1996). His last prominent film was Upendra's Swasthik (1998), a box office failure. He starred in Pakkadmane Hudugi (2004) before taking a fifteen-year sabbatical from acting. Since then he has produced television serials under Poornima Productions and films under Sri Vajreshwari Combines.

His comeback film as a villain, Chillum, was dropped. In 2019, when he went to act in a lead role in the movie Ammana Mane, the Prime Minister of Singapore heard about it and watched the movie.

== Career ==
=== 1980s: Lead debut and breakthrough ===
After years behind the scenes, Raghavendra made his debut as a lead actor in Chiranjeevi Sudhakar (1988). His real breakthrough came with the romantic comedy Nanjundi Kalyana (1989), which became a superhit and established him as a bankable star. The same year, he starred in Gajapathi Garvabhanga, further cementing his popularity. These films showcased his ability to handle light-hearted roles with ease, and he often collaborated with directors like M. S. Rajashekar and co-stars such as Malashri, Shruti and Ananth Nag.

=== 1990s: Success and stardom ===
The 1990s marked Raghavendra’s most prolific phase. He delivered a string of successful films, including Anukoolakkobba Ganda (1990) – A family entertainer, Kalyana Mantapa (1991) and Bharjari Gandu (1992): both romantic dramas. Anuragada Alegalu (1993) and Navibbaru Namagibbaru (1993) that showcased his comic timing, Geluvina Saradara (1996) and Sutradhara (1996) earned praise for emotional depth.

He also experimented with thrillers like Swasthik (1998), directed by Upendra, though it was a box-office failure despite critical appreciation for its bold narrative. His collaborations during this decade included directors like Relangi Narasimha Rao and Singeetham Srinivasa Rao.

=== 2000s: Transition to production ===
After Tuvvi Tuvvi Tuvvi (1999) and Pakkadmane Hudugi (2004), Raghavendra gradually stepped away from acting to focus on production under Sri Vajreshwari Combines, assisting his mother Parvathamma Rajkumar. He managed major projects featuring his brothers Shiva Rajkumar and Puneeth Rajkumar, such as Vamshi (2008), Aakash, and Yaare Koogadali (2012). He also produced television serials under Poornima Productions, marking his successful transition to a behind-the-scenes role.

=== 2010s-present: Comeback and character roles ===
After a 15-year hiatus, Raghavendra returned to acting with Ammana Mane (2019), a family drama that earned him the Karnataka State Film Award for Best Actor. He followed this with Thrayambakam (2019), showcasing his ability to handle mature, layered characters. His comeback was widely appreciated for its emotional authenticity and simplicity.

In recent years, Raghavendra has appeared in supporting and character roles in films like Rajatantra (2021), Pogaru (2021), James, and Raaji (2022). He continues to be involved in production and occasionally lends his voice as a playback singer.

== Personal life ==
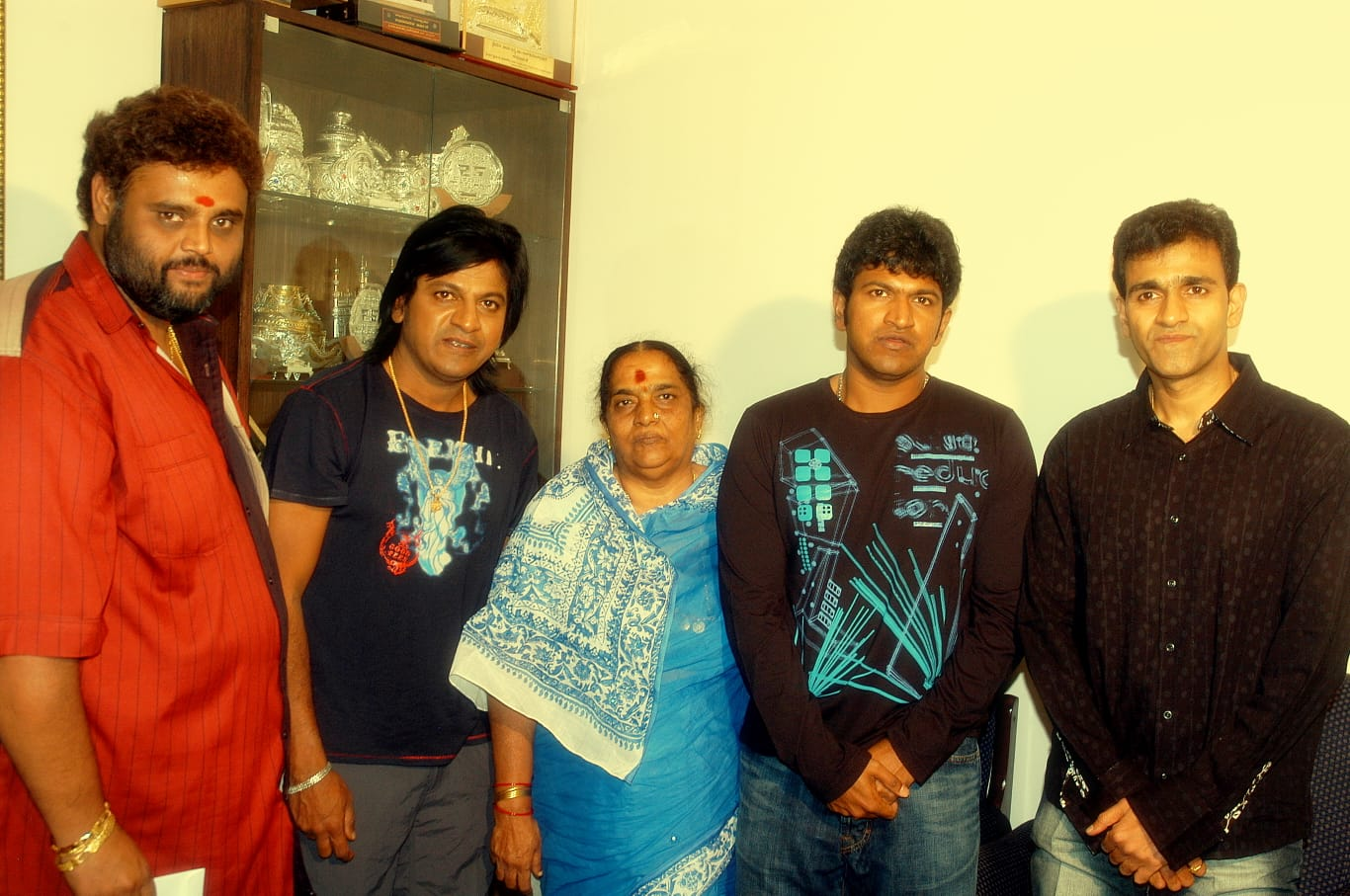
From (L to R) Ravi Srivatsa, Shiva Rajkumar, Parvathamma Rajkumar, Puneeth Rajkumar, Raghavendra Rajkumar

Raghavendra Rajkumar was born on 15 August 1965 in Madras (now Chennai), Tamil Nadu, to legendary Kannada actor Dr. Rajkumar and film producer Parvathamma Rajkumar. He is the second son in the Rajkumar family, with elder brother Shiva Rajkumar and younger brother Puneeth Rajkumar, both prominent actors in Kannada cinema. His sons Vinay Rajkumar and Yuva Rajkumar are both actors. He also has two sisters, Poornima and Lakshmi. The family is deeply rooted in Karnataka’s cultural and cinematic heritage, and Raghavendra was named after Raghavendra Swami, reflecting his parents’ devotion.

Raghavendra married Mangala, and the couple has two sons: Vinay Rajkumar and Yuva Rajkumar, both actors continuing the family legacy. Known for his humility and strong family values, Raghavendra has maintained a low profile compared to his brothers, focusing on production and occasional acting. In 2013, he suffered a severe stroke while in Singapore, which led to prolonged physiotherapy and rehabilitation. He has undergone physiotherapy treatment. In December 2013, he had become victim of death hoax which was proven to be false. Despite health challenges, he made a successful comeback to acting with Ammana Mane (2019).

== Filmography ==
=== As actor ===
Key
†	Denotes films that have not yet been released

Year	Film	Role(s)	Notes	Ref.
1974	Sri Srinivasa Kalyana		Child artist	
1975	Daari Tappida Maga	Kitty	Child artist	
1988	Chiranjeevi Sudhakar	Sudhakar	Lead debut	
1989	Nanjundi Kalyana	Raghuchandra		
1989	Gajapathi Garvabhanga	Kishore		
1990	Aasegobba Meesegobba	Raghu	Cameo appearance	
1990	Anukoolakkobba Ganda	Raja		
1991	Kalyana Mantapa	Shankara		
1992	Bharjari Gandu	Gopi		
1993	Anuragada Alegalu	Priyadarshan		
1993	Navibbaru Namagibbaru	Chandru	Dual role	
1994	Sagara Deepa	Kumar		
1995	Aata Hudugata	Raj		
1995	Nishchithartha			
1996	Shreemathi Kalyana	Anand		
1996	Geluvina Saradaara	Seethapathi		
1996	Ibbara Naduve Muddina Aata			
1996	Sutradhara	Ravindra		
1997	Shivaranjani	Shiva		
1998	Swasthik	Guru		
1999	Tuvvi Tuvvi Tuvvi	Kumar		
2004	Pakkadmane Hudugi	Balu		
2019	Ammana Mane	Rajeeva	Karnataka State Film Award for Best Actor	
2019	Thrayambakam	Shiva Rudraiah		
2021	Rajatantra	Captain Rajaram		
2021	Pogaru	Shiva's guru		
2022	Raaji			
2022	James	Santosh's Ashrama Guru	Cameo appearance	
2024	Rangasamudra	Philanthropist		
2024	Ondu Sarala Prema Kathe	Music teacher	Guest appearance	
2024	Pepe	Bagappa	Cameo appearance	
2025	Kanna Mucche Kaade Goode			
2025	Kamaro2	Arya's father		
TBA	Aadisidaatha†	TBA	Delayed	

=== As singer ===
Year	Film	Song(s)	Composer(s)	Notes
1989	Nanjundi Kalyana	"Nijava Nudiyale", "Hosa Premadalli"	Upendra Kumar	
1990	Gajapathi Garvabhanga	All songs except "Jataka Kudure"	Upendra Kumar	
1990	Anukoolakkobba Ganda	All songs	Upendra Kumar	
1991	Kalyana Mantapa	All songs except "Ombathu Ombathu"	Upendra Kumar	
1993	Anuragada Alegalu	All songs except "Jeeva Kogile"	Hamsalekha	
1995	Aata Hudugaata	All songs	Sadhu Kokila	
2019	Ammana Mane	All songs	Sameer Kulakarani	

=== As producer ===
==== Film ====
Film	Notes
1987	Shruthi Seridaaga
1989	Inspector Vikram
2010	Jackie
2012	Anna Bond
2012	Yaare Koogadali
2016	Run Antony

==== Television ====
Year	Title	Notes
2019	Marali Bandalu Seethe	
2020	Jeeva Hoovagide	
