= Tuvvi Tuvvi Tuvvi =

- VCD cover
- Directed by: Singeetam Srinivasa Rao
- Written by: Richard Louis
- Produced by: Parvathamma Rajkumar
- Starring: Raghavendra Rajkumar; Charulatha
- Cinematography: B. C. Gowrishankar
- Edited by: S. Manohar
- Music by: Hamsalekha
- Production company: Dakshayani Cine Combines
- Release date: 5 February 1999
- Running time: 140 minutes
- Country: India
- Language: Kannada

Tuvvi Tuvvi Tuvvi is a 1999 Indian Kannada-language comedy film directed by Singeetam Srinivasa Rao and written by Richard Louis. The film stars Raghavendra Rajkumar and Charulatha. It was released on 5 February 1999.

== Cast ==
- Raghavendra Rajkumar as Kumar
- Charulatha as Leena
- Doddanna as Peter Braganza
- C. R. Simha as Mutthappa
- M. S. Umesh as Oorukoti
- Ramakrishna as Shivu
- Richard Louis as Kempanna
- Mandya Ramesh
- Jayanthi as Maria
- Vinaya Prasad as Geetha

== Soundtrack ==
The soundtrack was composed by Hamsalekha.

Track listing
No.	Title	Singer(s)	Length
1.	"Tuvvi Tuvvi Tuvvi"	Dr. Rajkumar
2.	"Bande Bande"	Rajesh Krishnan, Manjula Gururaj
3.	"Maria, Oh Maria"	Ramesh Chandra, Sangeetha Katti
4.	"Billi Billi"	Rajesh Krishnan, Manjula Gururaj
5.	"Olavendare"	Dr. Rajkumar

== Release and reception ==
Tuvvi Tuvvi Tuvvi was released on 5 February 1999. Jyothi Raghuram of The Hindu said, "Tuvvi Tuvvi Tuvvi [...] might not mark the resurrection of Raghavendra Rajkumar, but it certainly is a boost to the Kannada industry for the clean entertainment it provides. The story is different and original. the casting is thoughtful, music is not a letdown; and on this has been built an attractive edifice by veteran Singeetam Srinivasa Rao. What more could one ask for in a day of remakes and "masala" films." S. Shivakumar of The Times of India said, "Tuvvi tuvvi tuvvi is not great cinema but when your nerves have been assaulted from [A to Z], this film acts as an aspirin."
