= Katari Veera =

1966 Kannada film directed by Y. R. Swamy

- Directed by: Y. R. Swamy
- Screenplay by: Y. R. Swamy
- Produced by: T. Vasanna; S. Heera
- Starring: Dr. Rajkumar; Udaya Chandrika; Udaykumar; Narasimharaju; Balakrishna
- Cinematography: R. Madhu
- Edited by: R. Hanumantha Rao
- Music by: Upendra Kumar
- Production company: Saraswathi Films
- Distributed by: Saraswathi Films
- Release date: 26 February 1966
- Country: India
- Language: Kannada

Katari Veera is a 1966 Indian Kannada-language swashbuckler film directed by Y. R. Swamy and produced by T. Vasanna and S. Heera. The film stars Dr. Rajkumar, Udaya Chandrika, Udaykumar, Narasimharaju, Balakrishna and Vanisri . This is the first Kannada film of actress Udaya Chandrika and was also the debut movie of Nagappa – who went on to become one of the popular villains of his time. The film has musical score by Upendra Kumar who also made his debut in Kannada movies through this movie.

== Cast ==
- Dr. Rajkumar
- Udaykumar
- Narasimharaju
- Balakrishna
- Rathnakar
- Nagappa
- Kuppuraj
- Nagappa
- Srikanth
- Shyamsundar
- D. T. Shashiraj
- Udaya Chandrika
- Vanisri
- Shobharani alias Shymala Shetty
- Papamma
- Baby Sunitha
- Vidyashree
- Janaki

== Soundtrack ==
The music was composed by Upendra Kumar. The song "Changu Changendu Haaruva", sung by P. Susheela is a huge hit.

| No. | Song | Singers | Lyrics | Length (m:ss) |
|---|---|---|---|---|
| 1 | "Haayaada Ee Sangama" | S. Janaki, P. B. Sreenivas | Sorat Ashwath | 03:33 |
| 2 | "Jhan Jhana" | L. R. Eswari | Sorat Ashwath | 03:22 |
| 3 | "Changu Changendu" | P. Susheela | Sorat Ashwath | 03:30 |
