= Swasthik =

- VCD cover
- Directed by: Upendra
- Written by: Mico Dileep (Dialogues)
- Screenplay by: Upendra
- Story by: Upendra
- Produced by: Parvathamma Rajkumar
- Starring: Raghavendra Rajkumar; Vijayalakshmi; Srinath
- Cinematography: B. C. Gowrishankar
- Edited by: T. Shashikumar
- Music by: V. Manohar
- Production company: Poornima Enterprises
- Distributed by: Vajreshwari Combines
- Release date: 3 October 1998
- Running time: 140 minutes
- Country: India
- Language: Kannada

Swasthik is a 1998 Indian Kannada language thriller film directed by Upendra, starring Raghavendra Rajkumar, Vijayalakshmi and Srinath. At the 1998-99 Karnataka State Film Awards, the film won two awards; Best Art Direction (M. Ismail) and Best Sound Recording (S. Mahendran).

It was reported that the core storyline and plot twists of Vishwaroopam are thematically similar to this movie. It was also reported that the climax of the movie Run Anthony vaguely reminds of Swasthik. The film has over the years attained a cult status.

== Plot ==
The movie starts in Baramulla in Jammu and Kashmir, with a woman photographer who is running away from a terror attack. She is able to get to an Indian Army camp and shows the army men the photos of one of the men leading the attack. The scene then shifts to Bangalore, where the militant arrives dressed in Hindu clothes and meets his Muslim parents. He is then attacked by his parents and is taken away to a hospital to treat his injuries, while his parents are arrested and jailed.

The CBI chief (Srinath) visits them, who reveal that they could not bear to have a terrorist, who killed innocent people as their son, and that is why they attacked him. The CBI team then reaches the hospital where they find out the terrorist has escaped. In a slum in Bangalore a man named Guru (Raghavendra Rajkumar), who looks like the terrorist lives with his family, which consists of his parents, sister and grandmother. He is arrested when the police mistake him for the terrorist, being released soon after. He is however repeatedly arrested because of the actions of the terrorist, i.e. Guru's look-alike. It soon becomes clear however that Guru and the terrorist are one and the same.

He then kidnaps Rajeshwari (Sridurga)- daughter of the Defence Minister (Hulivan Gangadharayya) who is his love interest, demanding the release of an imprisoned militant named Imtiaz in exchange for her. He does this with the help of a man (Honnavalli Krishna) from his slum. He then cleverly convinces the police and the CBI that he and the terrorist are separate people. He then has his associate rig a projector at the drop zone to show a recording of Guru as the terrorist and when the imprisoned militant Imtiaz is released, a bomb explodes, destroying the projector. Guru goes after the jeep in which Imtiaz and his associate are in the excuse of catching it. As soon as his associate and Imtiaz jump out, he drives the jeep towards a petrol pump. Guru jumps out just as the jeep hits the pump, causing a big explosion. The police seeing the pre arranged bodies in the jeep think both terrorists are dead. Elsewhere, Guru shaves off the hair of the imprisoned terrorist. A swastika and some writings are revealed to be tattooed to his head. He writes it down, and then pours a liquid on the tattoos to remove it and lets him go. He then goes to the CBI chief.

It is revealed that this was the plan of Guru and the CBI chief. By staging the attack in Baramulla, the woman photographer, who was actually a CBI agent would ensure that the establishment think he was a big time terrorist. This would be reinforced when his pretend parents the aged Muslim couple, also agents would stab and non-fatally injure him, claiming not being able to bear to have a terrorist son. And by kidnapping the defence minister's daughter, he would be able to get the imprisoned militant. It is shown that the tattoos on the militant's head was the location of a cache of arms and explosives. Guru would place fake bombs in their place, thus convincing the terrorist groups that he was their ally. Then they would not attack thinking Guru had done their job for them or they would join hands with him to get the explosives and make a new ally.

While Guru is placing the fake bombs given to him by the CBI chief at Mysore Palace, he is confronted by Rajeshwari, at gunpoint. Even when he tells the whole truth, she does not believe him. So, Guru detonates a fake bomb, planning to convince her of the truth. However it really explodes and kills her, thus revealing it was a real bomb. Even though he is devastated by his actions, he regains his composure and escapes to his home where he tells his parents everything. However they attack and try to kill him. He escapes from there also and he goes to a secluded place. The CBI chief finds him and shoots Guru in both legs. He reveals to Guru that he is the son of an Officer of the Indian Army, who along with his wife were killed by terrorists in Jammu and Kashmir. The people who he thought were his parents are revealed to be terrorists of Pakistani descent, who raised him along with their daughter. The CBI chief, who has connections with terror groups, plans an attack along with Guru's fake parents.

He escapes with the help of his neighbor Pinky (Vijayalakshmi), who takes him to her house to help remove the bullets from his legs and bind his wounds. Angered by being betrayed by the people who he thought were his own, he places explosives on himself and goes to the Mysore palace, where he defuses some of the bombs he placed. However, he is unable to prevent the explosions of the other bombs, which kill his adopted sister along with several people. The terrorist couple, who are devastated by the death of their daughter, and the CBI chief are berated by Guru, for killing innocent people in the name of country and religion. Guru's fake father kills the CBI chief when he orders one of his subordinates to kill Guru. He along with his wife and mother admit their mistakes and surrender to the police, revealing to the police that Guru is innocent. The film ends with Guru being released and a voiceover stating that we must overcome prejudices connected with country, religion, etc., and live together equally.

== Cast ==
- Raghavendra Rajkumar as Guru
- Vijayalakshmi as Pinky
- Srinath as CBI Chief
- Sridurga as Rajeshwari, daughter of Defence Minister
- Honnavalli Krishna as Guru's friend
- Hulivana Gangadharayya as Defence Minister
- Vanishree as Guru's sister
- Ashwath Narayan as Pinky's father
- NGEF Ramamurthy as Guru's 'father'
- Radha Ramachandra as Guru's 'mother'
- Negro Johnny as Inspector Annayya
- Paapamma as Guru's grandmother
- Vaijanath Biradar as resident of slum

== Soundtrack ==
Swasthik

Soundtrack album by V. Manohar
- Released: 1998
- Genre: Feature film soundtrack
- Length: 27:54

V. Manohar composed the background score for the film and the soundtracks, with lyrics for the soundtracks penned by Manohar, Upendra and Venkatesh Prasad. The album consists of five soundtracks.

Track listing
| No. | Title | Lyrics | Singer(s) | Length |
|---|---|---|---|---|
| 1. | "Colour Colour" | V. Manohar | S. P. Balasubrahmanyam | 4:41 |
| 2. | "MinchuhuLa, Minchadhiru" | Upendra | Rajesh Krishnan, Suma Shastry | 4:17 |
| 3. | "Idu yelelu janumada love" | Upendra | Shankar Shanbhag, Rajesh Krishnan Upendra | 7:03 |
| 4. | "Jee Jee Kyajee" | Upendra | Rajesh | 6:09 |
| 5. | "Yeddelo Huduga" | Venkatesh Prasad | Dr. Rajkumar | 5:44 |
| Total length: | | | | 27:54 |

== Awards ==
- 1998-99 Karnataka State Film Awards
  - Best Art Direction – M. Ismail
  - Best Sound Recording – S. Mahendran
