= Pakkadmane Hudugi =

- DVD Cover
- Directed by: M. S. Rajashekar
- Written by: Dialogue: Thadoor Keshav; Rama Jogihalli
- Screenplay by: M. S. Rajashekar
- Story by: Arun Chowdhury
- Produced by: Sekhar Karlekkaar
- Starring: Raghavendra Rajkumar; Ranjitha
- Cinematography: Janardhan Babu
- Edited by: S Manohar
- Music by: Rajesh Ramanath
- Production company: Shivakumar Productions
- Release date: 17 August 2004
- Running time: 135 minutes
- Country: India
- Language: Kannada

Pakkadmane Hudugi (transl. The Girl Next Door) is a 2004 Indian Kannada-language romantic comedy film directed by M. S. Rajashekar, starring Raghavendra Rajkumar and Ranjitha. It is a remake of the Hindi film Padosan (1968) which in turn was based on the Bengali film Pasher Bari (1952).

== Cast ==
- Raghavendra Rajkumar as Balu
- Ranjitha as Indu
- Anant Nag as Chakravarthy
- Mohan as Indu's music teacher
- Doddanna
- Hulivana Gangadharaiah
- Karibasavaiah
- Sumithra
- Chitra Shenoy

== Production ==
This film marks the return of Raghavendra Rajkumar to acting after five years. A song was shot at M G Road, Bangalore.

== Soundtrack ==
Music by Rajesh Ramanath. Three songs were reused from Padosan and three additional songs were composed.

== Reception ==
SND of Deccan Herald wrote that "The director has followed the original story idea. His efforts to make this film lively as far as possible is [sic] clearly visible particularly in the first half which is mainly comedy". R. G. Vijayasarathy of IANS wrote that "In the end, Pakkadmane Hudugi turns out to be yet another Kannada film that fails to make any impact". A critic from Sify wrote: "Raghavendra Rajkumar is cool as Balu while Ananthnag and Mohan as Indu’s music teacher steal the show. Ranjitha is not up to the mark as heroine".
