= Bhootayyana Mommaga Ayyu =

- Film poster
- Directed by: Nagaraj Peenya
- Written by: Nagaraj Peenya
- Produced by: R. Varaprasad Shetty; Ravishanker; Anil
- Starring: Chikkanna; Sruthi Hariharan; Bullet Prakash; Tabla Nani
- Narrated by: Srujan Lokesh
- Cinematography: Nandakumar
- Edited by: Srinivas P. Babu
- Music by: Ravi Basrur
- Production company: Sri Vaishnavi Cine Creations
- Release date: 4 May 2018
- Country: India
- Language: Kannada

Bhootayyana Mommaga Ayyu (transl. Ayyu, grandson of Bhootayya) is a 2018 Indian Kannada-language comedy film written and directed by Nagaraj Peenya. Produced by R. Varaprasad Shetty under the banner of Sri Vaishnavi Cine Creations, the film released on 4 May 2018. Starring Chikkanna as Ayyu, the film also features Bullet Prakash, Sruthi Hariharan, Prashanth Siddhi and Tabla Nani in principal roles. The film marks the 1000th film of Honnavalli Krishna. The film score and soundtrack is composed by Ravi Basrur and the cinematography is by Nandakumar.

Although the title is borrowed from the 1974 film Bhootayyana Maga Ayyu directed by Siddalingaiah, the film's plot makes no connection with it. Actor Lokesh's son Srujan Lokesh was hired as a narrator for this film. Upon release, the film met with negative response from the critics.

== Cast ==
- Chikkanna as Ayyu
- Sruthi Hariharan as Sruthi
- Tabla Nani
- Bullet Prakash
- P. Ravishankar
- Prashanth Siddi
- Rockline Sudhakar
- Honnavalli Krishna
- M. S. Umesh
- Girija Lokesh

== Soundtrack ==
Ravi Basrur has composed the soundtrack for the film. The lyrics for the songs are written by Peenya Nagaraj. The song "Bhootayyana Mommaga" was performed by Basrur and Ananya Bhat.

No.	Title	Lyrics	Singer(s)	Length
1.	"Bhootayyana Mommoga Ayyu"	Peenya Nagaraj	Ravi Basrur, Ananya Bhat	2:49
Total length:				2:49
