= Ammana Mane =

2019 Kannada family drama film

- Film poster
- Directed by: Nikhil Manjoo Lingaiah
- Screenplay by: Nikhil Manjoo Lingaiah
- Story by: Sri Lalithe
- Produced by: Smt. Atmasri; R. S. Kumar
- Starring: Raghavendra Rajkumar; Rohini Nagesh
- Cinematography: Swami Googaredoddi
- Edited by: Nitesh Kumar B.
- Music by: Sameera Kulkarni
- Production companies: Sri Lalithe Chitralaya; Nisarga Creations
- Release date: 8 March 2019
- Country: India
- Language: Kannada

Ammana Mane (transl. Mother's house) is a 2019 Indian Kannada-language drama film directed by Nikhil Manjoo Lingaiah and starring Raghavendra Rajkumar and Rohini Nagesh. The film is based on a book by Sri Lalithe.

== Cast ==
- Raghavendra Rajkumar as Rajeeva
- Rohini Nagesh as Rajeeva's mother
- Sheetal Hemanth as Shive, Rajeeva's daughter
- Manasi Sudhir as Rajeeva's wife
- Suchendra Prasad as a judge
- Nikhil Manjoo as a police inspector
- Chaitra
- Tabla Nani

== Production ==
Raghavendra Rajkumar, was signed to make an acting comeback after fifteen years as an antagonist the film Chillam. However, he dropped out of the venture and was cast in the main role in Ammana Mane. In the film, he plays a man who is akin to himself: strong despite having health issues. The film also explores the relationship between a mother (played by Rohini Nagesh) and her son (played by Raghavendra Rajkumar). The mother-son relationship is inspired by Raghavendra Rajkumar's real life relationship with his mother, Parvathamma Rajkumar. Initial reports in 2018 suggested that B. Jayashree would play his mother in the film; however, these reports proved to be false. The film was shot at television actor Gadadhar Prem Kumar's home in NR Colony, Bengaluru. According to the director, the home played a central role in the film.

== Soundtrack ==
The songs were composed by Sameera Kulkarni. All tracks were sung by Raghavendra Rajkumar.

No.	Title	Singer(s)	Length
1.	"Ee Jeevake"	Raghavendra Rajkumar	1:10
2.	"Neenethake Nanna Noduve"	Raghavendra Rajkumar	1:10
3.	"Vidhiyaathada Nusikopake"	Raghavendra Rajkumar	1:10
Total length:			3:30

== Reception ==
A critic from The Times of India gave the film a rating of two-and-half out of five stars and wrote that "Ammana Mane touches upon some relevant issues and there is some occasional poignancy in the narrative, but the film ends up being jarring with regards to showcasing sentiments, and the pace doesn't help that either". A critic from Deccan Chronicle gave the film three out of five stars and wrote that "Naturally slow and steady makes it a meaningful watch in the end with Raghavendra Rajkumar at his challenging best. He is ably supported with the performances of others too". A critic from The New Indian Express gave the film a rating of three out of five and wrote that "As for the audience, this film has managed to create a niche, and is able to hold the attention of the audience throughout the two-hour long run. The plot drifts through a lot of ups and downs similar to the ones experienced in every middle-class family life".

== Awards and nominations ==
Year	Award	Category	Nominee	Result	Ref.
2018	Karnataka State Film Awards	Best Actor	Raghavendra Rajkumar	Won	
