= Aralida Hoovugalu =

- Directed by: Chi. Dattaraj
- Written by: Chi. Udaya Shankar
- Produced by: Parvathamma Rajkumar
- Starring: Shiva Rajkumar; Vidyashree; Chi Guru Dutt; K. S. Ashwath
- Cinematography: V. K. Kannan
- Edited by: S. Manohar
- Music by: Upendra Kumar
- Production company: Vajreshwari Combines
- Release date: 15 February 1991
- Running time: 142 minutes
- Country: India
- Language: Kannada

Aralida Hoovugalu is a 1991 Indian Kannada-language romantic drama film directed by Chi. Dattaraj, with screenplay, dialogues and lyrics written by Chi. Udaya Shankar. The film stars Shiva Rajkumar, Vidyashree and Chi Guru Dutt. Produced by Parvathamma Rajkumar under Vajreshwari combines, the film screened for over a hundred days in the cinema halls. The movie is a remake of the 1972 Hindi film Jawani Diwani.

== Cast ==
- Shiva Rajkumar as Vijay Kumar
- Vidyashree as Sudha
- Chi Guru Dutt as Chandrakant
- Srinath
- K. S. Ashwath as college principal
- Thoogudeepa Srinivas
- Sihi Kahi Chandru
- Srilalitha
- Sathyabhama
- Master Vijay Raghavendra as Vijay's nephew

== Soundtrack ==
The soundtrack of the film was composed by Upendra Kumar.

Track listing
| No. | Title | Lyrics | Singer(s) | Length |
|---|---|---|---|---|
| 1. | "Aakasha Melide" | Chi. Udaya Shankar | S. P. Balasubrahmanyam, Manjula Gururaj |
| 2. | "Kaamana Billali" | Chi. Udaya Shankar | S. P. Balasubrahmanyam, Manjula Gururaj |
| 3. | "Nudisuve Bali Baa" | Chi. Udaya Shankar | S. P. Balasubrahmanyam, Manjula Gururaj |
| 4. | "Ella Maja Ille Nija" | Bangi Ranga | S. P. Balasubrahmanyam |
| 5. | "Atthe Magale" | Bangi Ranga | S. P. Balasubrahmanyam |
