= Gajapathi Garvabhanga =

- Poster
- Directed by: M. S. Rajashekar
- Written by: T. N. Narasimhan (Story)
- Screenplay by: Chi. Udayashankar
- Produced by: Parvathamma Rajkumar
- Starring: Raghavendra Rajkumar; Malashri
- Cinematography: V.K.Kannan
- Edited by: S.Manoohar
- Music by: Upendra Kumar
- Distributed by: Dakshayini Combines
- Release date: December 4, 1989
- Running time: 150 minutes
- Country: India
- Language: Kannada

Gajapathi Garvabhanga is a 1989 Indian comedy film in Kannada language directed by M. S. Rajashekar and produced by the actor Rajkumar's production company Purnima Enterprise.The movie stars his second son Raghavendra Rajkumar and Malashri. The cast included Dheerendra Gopal, Srinath and Honnavalli Krishna. The film was a box office success, and it ran in theatres for 365 days. Raghavendra Rajkumar's previous movie Nanjundi Kalyana was also a comedy with involving many of the same cast and crew.

== Cast ==
- Raghavendra Rajkumar as Kishore
- Malashri as Sowmya
- K. S. Ashwath as Ranganna Meshtru
- Srinath as Ananthu Meshtru
- Dheerendra Gopal as Gajapathi, Sowmya's father
- Shubha as Gajapathi's wife
- Sangeeta
- Honnavalli Krishna as "Kudure" Krishna
- Mysore Lokesh
- Mandeep Roy
- Doddanna
- Dombara Krishna Suresh
- Killer Venkatesh
- Negro Johnny
- Shivaram
- Abhinaya as Shobha
- M. S. Umesh as Thippayya
- Tennis Krishna
- Sadashiva Brahmavara

== Soundtrack ==
All music is composed by Upendr Kumar.

No.	Title	Lyrics	Singer(s)	Length
1.	"Hosa Ragavidu"	Sri Ranga	Raghavendra Rajkumar, Manjula Gururaj
2.	"Jataka Kudure"	Sri Ranga	Manjula Gururaj
3.	"Tharakari Thayamma"	Chi. Udhayashankar	Raghavendra Rajkumar
4.	"Maduveya Vayasu"	Chi. Udhayashankar	Raghavendra Rajkumar, Manjula Gururaj
5.	"Olida Swaragalu"	Chi. Udhayashankar	Raghavendra Rajkumar, Manjula Gururaj, Kusuma, Madhusudan
