= Ade Raaga Ade Haadu =

Ade Raga Ade Hadu
- Directed by: M. S. Rajashekar
- Written by: T. N. Narasimhan
- Starring: Shiva Rajkumar; Seema
- Cinematography: B. C. Gowrishankar
- Edited by: P. Bhakthavathsalam
- Music by: Shankar–Ganesh
- Release date: 26 June 1989
- Running time: 159 min.
- Country: India
- Language: Kannada

Ade Raga Ade Hadu ( transl. Same Symphony Same Song) is 1989 Indian Kannada-language horror thriller film directed by M. S. Rajashekar and produced by S. A. Govindaraj. The film stars Shiva Rajkumar and Seema, a debutant, along with Srinath and Thoogudeepa Srinivas.

== Plot ==
The story starts with Chandu and his friends, who are pursuing MBBS degree, they challenge Sangeetha for her tomboyish attitude. Gradually, Sangeetha starts loving Chandu. Both Chandu and Sangeetha plan to get married with the blessing of their parents. As preparations for marriage are on the way, Sangeetha starts to behave strangely and antagonistic towards Chandu, who is attacked by a ghost during Anatomy class in her college. Though Chandu is perplexed by her behaviour, He follows Sangeetha one day going to an old bungalow and recognizes the ghost from a photo of an old lady who had previously cursed him.

Chandu learns the story of the old lady from another woman, friend of old lady, who reveals (through a flashback) that she was once a rich lady, whose daughter, Deepa, had fallen in love with a poor man, Nanda; in a fit of rage, Deepa is beaten by her mother and warned to avoid him due to status issues, also sends goons to attack Nanda also; Deepa fleas to be with her lover, but her mother kills the lovers by burning down Nanda's house without knowing Deepa's presence with him. In a turn of events, the old lady turns mentally unstable, loses all her wealth and finally dies in a car accident.

After hearing this, Chandu realizes that he and Sangeetha are the recantation of the ill-fated lovers and Deepa's mother now possesses Sangeetha's body and is trying to kill Chandu. The story that follows is the attempts of Chandu to save Deepa's life from the ill-attempts of the ghost and finally saving her from the clutches of the ghost.

== Cast ==
- Shiva Rajkumar as Chandru / Nanda
- Seema as Sangeetha / Deepa
- Srinath as Madhav Rao, Chandru's father
- Thoogudeepa Srinivas as Raghupathi, Sangeetha's father
- Shivakumar as Vishwanath, Sangeetha's brother
- Pramila Joshai as Rathna, Chandru's mother
- Girija Lokesh as Kaveri, Sangeetha's mother
- Sundarashree as Subbalakshmi
- Mico Kitty
- Go Ra Bheema Rao
- Gopalakrishna
- Srishailan
- Karanth
- Chikkanna
- Kunigal Ramanath
- Kannada Raju

== Soundtrack ==
The film's original score and soundtrack was composed by Shankar–Ganesh and the audio was sold on Sangeetha label.

No.	Song title	Singers	Lyrics
1	"Anuragada Hosa"	S. P. Balasubrahmanyam, Manjula Gururaj	Chi. Udaya Shankar
2	"Kannalli Ninthe"	S. P. Balasubrahmanyam, Manjula Gururaj	Chi. Udaya Shankar
3	"Eleya Maradali"	Manjula Gururaj	Chi. Udaya Shankar
4	"Annayya Thammayya"	S. P. Balasubrahmanyam	Chi. Udaya Shankar
5	"Atthe Magala"	S. P. Balasubrahmanyam	Chi. Udaya Shankar
