= Shambhavi =

Epithet of Parvati

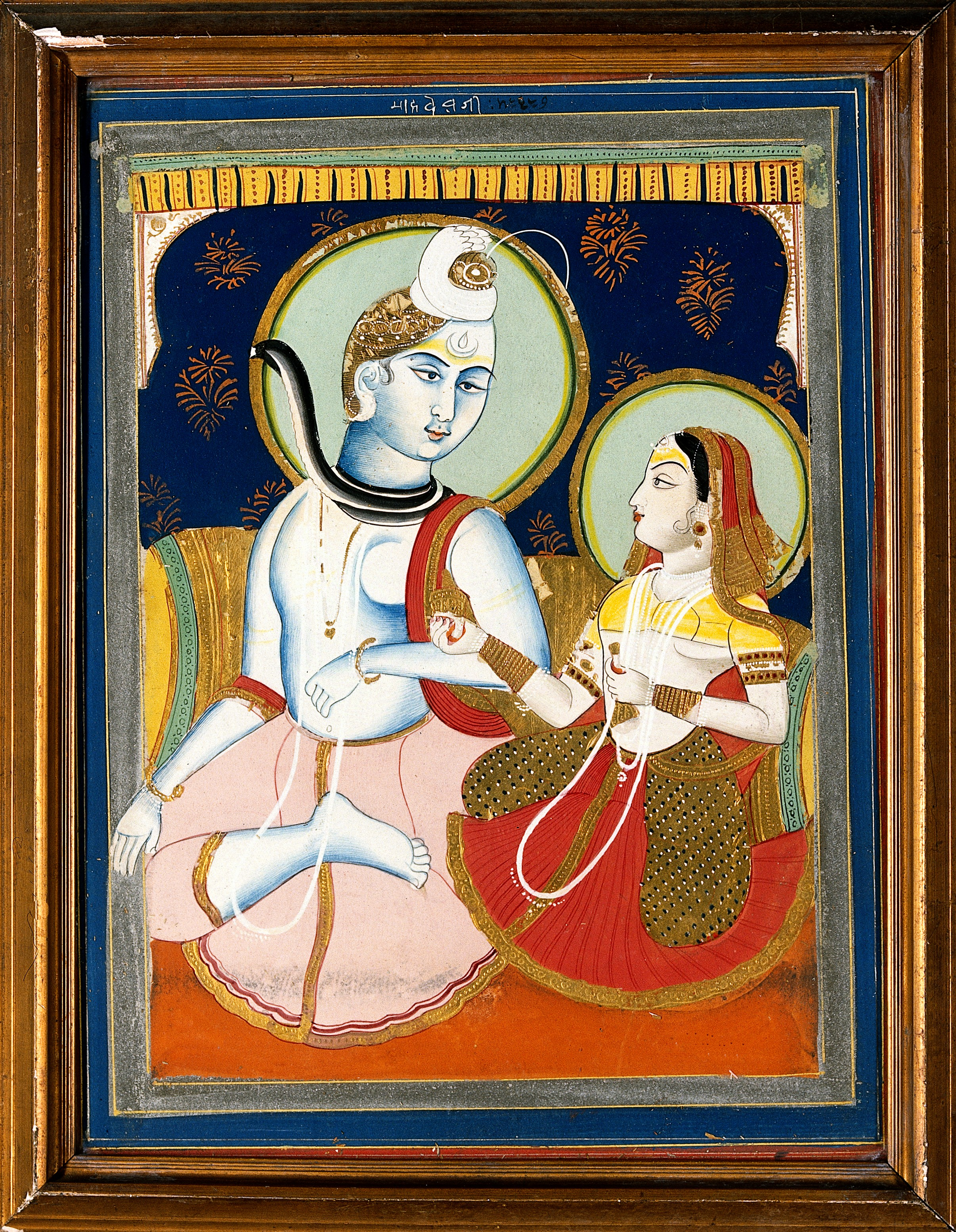
Painting of Parvati with Shiva

Shambhavi (Sanskrit: शाम्भवी, IAST: Śāmbhavī) is an epithet of the Hindu goddess Parvati. It is the feminine form of Shambhu, an epithet of Shiva that means, "the benevolent one".

== See also ==
- Shakti
- Vishalakshi
- Meenakshi
