= Parvathamma Rajkumar =

Indian film producer and distributor (1939–2017)

Dr Parvathamma Rajkumar
- Born: Parvathamma; 6 December 1939; Saligrama, Kingdom of Mysore, British India
- Died: 31 May 2017 (aged 77); Bangalore, Karnataka, India
- Spouse: Rajkumar (m. 1953; died 2006)
- Children: 5 (including Shiva, Raghavendra, Puneeth)
- Relatives: See Rajkumar family

Parvathamma Rajkumar (6 December 1939 – 31 May 2017) was an Indian film producer and distributor. She was the wife and cousin of veteran Kannada actor Dr. Rajkumar. She produced successful films featuring him and their sons Shiva Rajkumar, Puneeth Rajkumar and Raghavendra Rajkumar under the production house named "Poornima Enterprises". Actresses who found fame in her productions include Malashri, Prema, Rakshita, Sudha Rani and Ramya. She was awarded a doctorate by Bangalore University.

Amongst the awards she has received are the Kannada Rajyotsava and a lifetime achievement award from the Government of Karnataka. By 2012, she had produced 80 films. She had spoken in defence of Kannadigas, regarding Karnataka's position in interstate water disputes and against infringement of the Kannada film industry's works.

== Early life and family ==
Parvathamma was born in Saligrama of Mysore district of the erstwhile Kingdom of Mysore on 6 December 1939 to Appaji Gowda and Lakshmamma, as the second of eight children. Singanallur Puttaswamaiah, her uncle and future father-in-law, reportedly placed a silver coin in her cradle and vowed to make her his daughter-in-law. Aged 14, she married his son, her cousin, the future matinée idol Rajkumar on 25 June 1953. They have five children together: sons Shiva, Raghavendra and Puneeth, and daughters Lakshmi and Poornima. Rajkumar died on 12 April 2006 and their son Puneeth died on 29 October 2021, both from cardiac arrest.

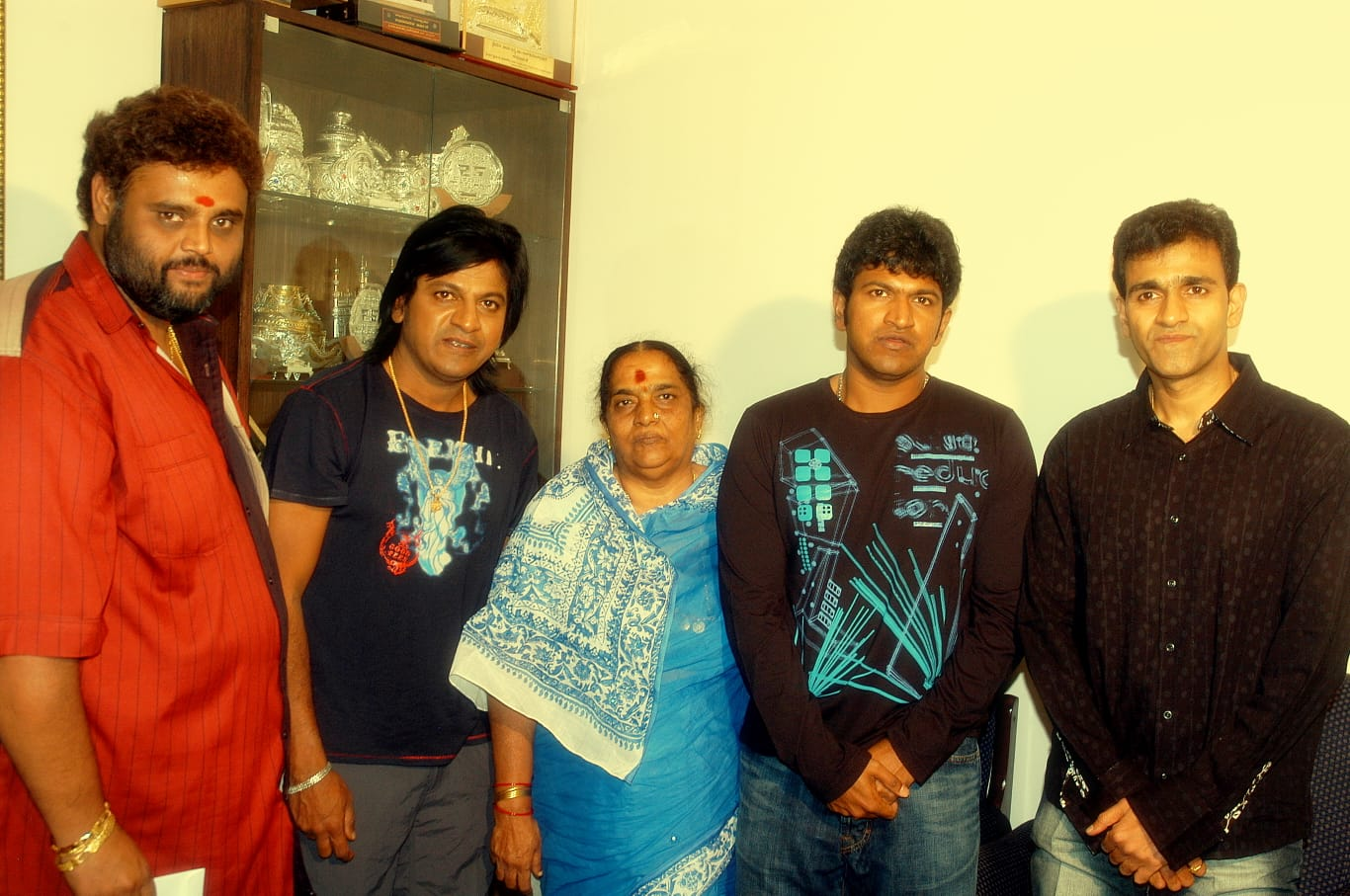
From (L to R) Ravi Srivatsa, Shiva Rajkumar, Parvathamma Rajkumar, Puneeth Rajkumar, Raghavendra Rajkumar

Parvathamma was taken to MS Ramaiah Memorial Hospital on 14 May 2017 to treat her for weakness. On 17 May, she was shifted to the intensive care unit after she had difficulty in breathing and was on assisted ventilation, following which a tracheotomy was performed on her to ease breathing. Also, she had developed metastasis despite having been treated for a malignancy a few years previously. She had a cardiac arrest at 4:30 a.m. (IST) on 31 May 2017. Efforts to revive her failed and she was pronounced dead at 4:40 a.m. (IST). It was reported that "malignancy had spread to the lungs and liver".

== Film career ==
She established a family firm for film production called Sri Vajreshwari Combines or Poornima enterprises. The first movie she produced was Trimurthi with her husband in a lead role; Trimurthi was a great success. Her brothers S.A. Chinne Gowda, S.A. Govindaraj, and S.A. Srinivas are also film producers.

She has produced over 80 films and launched her three sons as film stars. Her most successful films with her husband in a lead role include Trimurthy, Haalu Jenu, Kaviratna Kalidasa and Jeevana Chaitra. She produced Anand, Om, Janumada Jodi and several other movies with her oldest son Shiv Rajkumar in lead role. Her son Raghavendra Rajkumar played the lead in Chiranjeevi Sudhakar, Nanjundi Kalyana, Swasthik and Tuvvi Tuvvi Tuvvi. Her youngest son Puneeth starred in Appu, Abhi and Hudugaru.

== Filmography ==
=== Rajkumar in lead role ===
1. Trimurti
2. Giri Kanye
3. Olavu Geluvu
4. Shankar Guru
5. Thayige Thakka Maga
6. Ravichandra
7. Vasantha Geetha
8. Havina Hede
9. Nee Nanna Gellalare
10. Bhagyavantha
11. Hosa Belaku
12. Haalu Jenu
13. Chalisuva Modagalu
14. Kaviratna Kalidasa
15. Kaamana Billu
16. Bhakta Prahlada
17. Eradu Nakshatragalu
18. Samayada Gombe
19. Shravana Banthu
20. Yarivanu
21. Apoorva Sangama
22. Jwaalamukhi
23. Dhruva Thare
24. Bhagyada Lakshmi Baramma
25. Anuraga Aralithu
26. Guri
27. Ondu Muttina Kathe
28. Shruthi Seridaaga
29. Shiva Mecchida Kannappa
30. Devatha Manushya
31. Parashuram
32. Jeevana Chaitra
33. Aakasmika
34. Odahuttidavaru
35. Shabdavedhi

=== Shiva Rajkumar in lead role ===
1. Anand
2. Ratha Sapthami
3. Mana Mechchida Hudugi
4. Samyuktha
5. Aasegobba Meesegobba
6. Aralida Hoovugalu
7. Ranaranga
8. Inspector Vikram
9. Ade Raaga Ade Haadu
10. Mruthyunjaya
11. Mavanige Thakka Aliya
12. Midida Shruthi
13. Om
14. Modadha Mareyalli
15. Janumada Jodi
16. Hrudaya Hrudaya
17. Chigurida Kanasu

=== Raghavendra Rajkumar in lead role ===
1. Chiranjeevi Sudhakar
2. Nanjundi Kalyana
3. Gajapathi Garvabhanga
4. Geluvina Saradara
5. Soothradara
6. Anukoolakkobba Ganda
7. Aralidha Hoogalu
8. Kalyana Mantapa
9. Barjari Gandu
10. Anuragada Alegalu
11. Navibbaru Namagibbaru
12. Swasthik
13. Tuvvi Tuvvi Tuvvi

=== Puneeth Rajkumar in lead role ===
1. Bettada Hoovu
2. Appu
3. Abhi
4. Akash
5. Arasu
6. Vamshi
7. Jackie
8. Hudugaru
9. Anna Bond
10. Yaare Koogadali

=== Vinay Rajkumar in lead role ===
1. Siddhartha
2. Run Antony

== Awards ==
- 2016 - Padmabhushan Dr. B. Saroja Devi National Award
- 2007 - Rajyotsava Prashasti from Karnataka Government.
- Suvarna Award – Contribution to Kannada Cinema.

Karnataka State Film Awards

- 1982–83: First Best Film — Haalu Jenu
- 1992–93: First Best Film — Jeevana Chaitra
- 1999–2000: Special Film of Social Concern — Shabdavedhi
- 2007–08: Dr. Vishnuvardhan Lifetime Achievement Award

Filmfare Awards South

- 1985: Best Film (Kannada): Bettada Hoovu
- 1986: Best Film (Kannada): Bhagyada Lakshmi Baramma
- 1996: Best Film (Kannada): Janumada Jodi
- 2010: Best Film (Kannada): Jackie
