= Midida Shruthi =

- Poster
- Directed by: M. S. Rajashekar
- Written by: Saisuthe (Based on a novel of same name)
- Produced by: S. A. Govindaraj
- Starring: Shiva Rajkumar; Sudharani; Srinath; Hema Choudhary; Vinaya Prasad
- Cinematography: V. K. Kannan
- Edited by: S. Manohar
- Music by: Upendra Kumar
- Production company: Nirupama Art Combines
- Release date: 6 February 1992
- Running time: 150 minutes
- Country: India
- Language: Kannada

Midida Shruthi is a 1992 Indian Kannada-language romance drama film directed by M. S. Rajashekar and produced by S. A. Govindaraj. The film stars Shiva Rajkumar, Sudharani, Srinath, Hema Choudhary and Vinaya Prasad. The film's plot is based on the novel of same name, written by Sai Suthe.

== Cast ==
- Shiva Rajkumar as Balu
- Sudharani as Sujatha
- Srinath as Dr Sampath
- Hema Chaudhary as Dr Lakshmi
- Bharath Bhagavathar as Dr Harish
- Vinaya Prasad as Dr Mamatha
- Sundar Krishna Urs as Giridhar
- Shimoga Venkatesh as Sujatha's father
- Sundarashri as Girijamma, Sujatha's mother
- Ravishankar as Kumar
- Ravikiran as Paandu
- Devaraj
- Apsara as Shaila
- Aravind (Kannada actor) (Aravind) as Prakash
- Mandeep Roy as College Lecturer
- Leela Basavaraju
- Parvathi
- Naveen

== Soundtrack ==
The soundtrack of the film was composed by Upendra Kumar.

Track listing
No.	Title	Lyrics	Singer(s)	Length
1.	"Aa Surya Chandra"	M. N. Vyasa Rao	S. P. Balasubrahmanyam, Manjula Gururaj
2.	"Nanna Ninna Aase"	Geethapriya	S. P. Balasubrahmanyam, Manjula Gururaj
3.	"Bannada Okuli"	Sri Ranga	S. P. Balasubrahmanyam, Manjula Gururaj
4.	"Nenedodane America"	Hamsalekha	S. P. Balasubrahmanyam
5.	"Yaavudu Preethi"	M. N. Vyasa Rao	S. P. Balasubrahmanyam, Manjula Gururaj
