= Nanjundi Kalyana =

- Poster
- Directed by: M. S. Rajashekar
- Written by: Chi. Udaya Shankar
- Produced by: Parvathamma Rajkumar
- Starring: Raghavendra Rajkumar; Girija Lokesh; Malashri
- Cinematography: V. K. Kannan
- Edited by: P. Bhaktavatsalam
- Music by: Upendra Kumar
- Production company: Vajreshwari Combines
- Release date: 1989
- Country: India
- Language: Kannada
- Box office: ₹ 8 crores

Nanjundi Kalyana (transl. Nanjundi's marriage) is a 1989 Indian Kannada-language romantic comedy film, directed by M. S. Rajashekar, starring newcomers Raghavendra Rajkumar and Malashri, with Girija Lokesh and Sundar Krishna Urs as the lead cast. The film was an industry hit and was the highest ever grossing Kannada movie at that time. The movie saw a theatrical run of 90 weeks.

The story is based on Parvathavani's Kannada play Bahaddur Ganda which was a translation of William Shakespeare's comedy The Taming of the Shrew. The film was remade in Telugu in 1990 as Mahajananiki Maradalu Pilla.

== Plot ==
The film is a family drama which starts with the Gauri Ganesha festival. While offering pooja to goddess Gauri, mother of Raghuchandra (Raghavendra Rajkumar) receives a money order as a gift for the festival from her brother. She is excited at the affection of her brother on sending the gift. Seeing this, the father of Raghuchandra remembers his past of having his sister and brother-in-law (Sundar Krishna Urs) living in his home and on this festival when he gave a gift to his sister, her husband fought for some reason and left the home with his wife. The father tells his son (Raghuchandra) these past feelings and says that he and his sister had thought of marrying Raghuchandra to his sister's daughter Devi (Malashri).

Raghuchandra moves to the city to his aunt's home with the name of Nanjundi (his uncle who had died 20 years earlier). Sundar Krishna urs thinks that he is truly Nanjundi and allows him to live in his home. After Sundar Krishna urs left the village, they had 2 more daughters Laxmi and Saraswati, whom Raghuchandra does not know. Nanjundi (Raghavendra Rajkumar) has to marry the eldest daughter Devi. She is very arrogant and not interested in marriage, because of her the other two sisters marriage who had been engaged to Krishnamurthy (Balaraj) and Puttaswamy (Chi Ravi Shankar) is being continuously postponed.

Even Devi's parents are fed up of convincing her for marriage. Finally, when Nanjundi convinces that he is ready to marry Devi, her parents say that he should convince her himself. He does propose and performs stunts to convince her, in response, she sends fighters to hit him. When all her plans fail, she will be ready to marry him and to let him as her servant after marriage. All three sisters get married on the same day without the presence of Nanjundi's (Raghuchandra) parents. After marriage, he takes her to the village where he lives in their house-servant house. He acknowledges her that he is only a servant and not Nanjundi. He had cheated her and her parents. At the end when her parents come to the village she will have been left all her old styles and arrogance and she wants to live in that small house with her husband. Finally, all of them learn the truth that the son-in-law is none other than Raghuchandra.

== Cast ==
- Raghavendra Rajkumar as Raghuchandra/Nanjundi (in disguise)
- Malashri as Devi
- Balaraj as Raghuchandra's friend
- Lalitanjali
- Chi Ravishankar as Raghuchandra's friend
- G.V. Shivanand as Raghuchandra's father
- Girija Lokesh as Raghuchandra's mother
- Sundar Krishna Urs as Devi's father
- Shubha as Devi's mother
- Thoogudeepa Srinivas
- Mysore Lokesh
- Dheerendra Gopal
- Sathyabhama

== Production ==
Writer and lyricist Chi. Udaya Shankar first introduced Sridurga to the Rajkumar family, who were on the lookout for a fresh face. In a lead role, she was introduced by Parvathamma Rajkumar, and cast her opposite her son Raghavendra Rajkumar for the film, who also changed her name as Malashri. According to Muralidhara Khajane of The Hindu that the plot was similar to the story Taming of the Shrew by William Shakespeare.

== Soundtrack ==
The songs composed by Upendra Kumar were well received and were among the top chart-busters in the Kannada film industry. The song "Olage Seridare Gundu" rendered by Manjula Gururaj became very popular and made Malashri famous among the masses. The song was remixed in 2014 film Gharshane also starred Malashree.

Upendra Kumar retained all the six songs from this movie in the Telugu version.

Kannada Version

Track list
No.	Title	Lyrics	Singer(s)	Length
1.	"Olage Seridare Gundu"	Bangi Ranga	Manjula	4:46
2.	"Nijava Nudiyale"	Chi. Udayashankar	Raghavendra Rajkumar, Manjula, Chorus	5:20
3.	"Baduke Hasiru"	Chi. Udayashankar	Rajkumar	3:51
4.	"Oh Nanna Hudugi"	Chi. Udayashankar	Raghavendra Rajkumar	3:59
5.	"Hosa Premadali"	Chi. Udayashankar	Raghavendra Rajkumar, Chorus	5:31
6.	"Innu Gyaaranti"	Chi. Udayashankar	S. P. Balasubrahmanyam, Mohan Jimpets, Chorus	4:14
Total length:				27:49

Telugu Version

This film was dubbed into Telugu as Naaku Mogudu Kavali. All songs were written by Rajasri.

Track list
No.	Title	Singer(s)	Length
1.	"Chilipi Oohalu"	S. P. Balasubrahmanyam, K. S. Chithra	5:23
2.	"O Chinnadana"	S. P. Balasubrahmanyam	3:44
3.	"Chukkalanti Oka Chukka"	K. S. Chithra	4:42
4.	"Baduke Swargam"	S. P. Balasubrahmanyam	3:46
5.	"Oka Prema Katha"	S. P. Balasubrahmanyam	5:25
6.	"Ika Guarantee"	S. P. Balasubrahmanyam	4:14
Total length:			27:17

== Reception ==
Upon release the movie received positive reviews. The movie ran for over 535 days becoming the then second longest running Kannada movie after Bangarada Manushya and was an industry hit. The movie had a theatrical run of 203 days at Indi, 112 days at Saligrama, 238 days at Banahatti, 119 days at Udupi, 112 days at Karwar, 133 days at Tiptur and 112 days at Kolar.
