= Honnavalli Krishna =

Indian actor (born 1950)

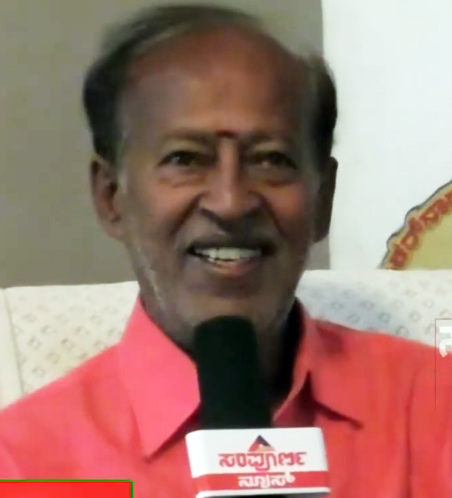
- Honnavalli Krishna in 2020
- Born: 4 February 1950 (age 76); Honnavalli, Arkalgud, Hassan District
- Occupation: Film actor

Honnavalli Krishna is an Indian actor in the Kannada film industry. His films include Ratha Sapthami (1986), Aasegobba Meesegobba (1990), Bhootayyana Maga Ayyu (1974), Janumada Jodi (1996).

== Career ==
As of October 2017, Honnavalli Krishna has acted in 1,000 films.

== Selected filmography ==
- Sanaadi Appanna (1977)
- Olavu Geluvu (1977)
- Shankar Guru (1978)
- Vasantha Geetha (1980)
- Keralida Simha (1981)
- Anand (1986)
- Ratha Sapthami (1986)
- Dhruva Thare (1985)
- Manamecchida Hudugi (1987)
- Shiva Mecchida Kannappa (1988)
- Samyuktha (1988)
- Inspector Vikram (1989)
- Gajapathi Garvabhanga (1989)
- Neene Nanna Jeeva (1990)
- Aasegobba Meesegobba (1990)
- Aata Bombata (1990)
- Mruthyunjaya (1990)
- Shruthi (1990)
- Modada Mareyalli (1991)
- Gowri Kalyana (1991)
- Bharjari Gandu (1992)
- Kumkuma Bhagya (1993)...Shiva
- Lockup Death (1994)
- Om (1995)
- Janumada Jodi (1996)
- Simhada Mari (1997)
- Ganga Yamuna (1997)
- Bhanda Alla Bahaddur (1997)
- Ranganna (1997)
- Swasthik (1998)
- Mari Kannu Hori Myage (1998)
- Veeranna (1998)
- Rambhe Urvashi Menake (1999)
- Yaarige Saluthe Sambala (2000)
- Shabdavedhi (2000)
- Appu (2002)
- Veera Kannadiga (2003)
- Raktha Kanneeru (2003)
- Ajju (2004)
- Durgi (2004)
- Aakash (2005)
- Mr. Bakra (2005)
- Anatharu (2007)
- Bandhu Balaga (2008)
- Aithalakkadi (2010)
- Jackie (2010)
- Vaare Vah (2010)
- Anna Bond (2012)
- Drama (2012)
- Akka Pakka (2013)
- Neralu (2013)
- Ond Chance Kodi (2015)
- Goolihatti (2015)
- Arivu (2017)
- Raajakumara (2017)
- Haalu Thuppa (2017)
- Banna Bannada Baduku (2017)
- Dhairyam (2017)
- Bhootayyana Mommaga Ayyu (2018)
- Kismath (2018)
- Mayabazar 2016 (2020)
- Auto Ramanna (2021)
- Harikathe Alla Girikathe (2022)

== See also ==
- List of people from Karnataka
- Cinema of Karnataka
- List of Indian film actors
- Cinema of India
