= Aakash (film) =

2005 Kannada romantic drama film

- Film poster
- Directed by: Mahesh Babu
- Screenplay by: Mahesh Babu
- Dialogues by: M. S. Ramesh
- Story by: Janardhana Maharshi
- Produced by: Parvathamma Rajkumar
- Starring: Puneeth Rajkumar; Ramya
- Cinematography: Prasad Babu
- Edited by: S. Manohar
- Music by: R. P. Patnaik
- Production company: Sri Chakreshwari Combines
- Distributed by: Sri Vajreshwari combines
- Release date: 29 April 2005
- Running time: 150 minutes
- Country: India
- Language: Kannada

Aakash is a 2005 Indian Kannada language romantic drama film directed by Mahesh Babu, written by Janardhana Maharshi and produced by Parvathamma Rajkumar. The film stars Puneeth Rajkumar, alongside Ramya, Ashish Vidyarthi, Kishore and Avinash. The music was composed by R. P. Patnaik, while cinematography and ediring were handled by Prasad Babu and S. Manohar.

At the Karnataka State Film Awards, the film won the Best Editor award for S. Manohar.

== Plot ==
Aakash, a practical person working in various job fields, meets Nandini, a woman from a rich background. Aakash and Nandini become friends and Nandini gets attracted to Aakash, but Aakash considers Nandini as his friend. However, Nandini's brothers Dayananda and Chidananda misunderstand Aakash to be in love with Nandini and begin to create havoc in Aakash's life, where Aakash loses his job and gets attacked. Aakash's sister Asha's engagement with Vishal gets broken due to Chidananda, who humiliates Asha.

Enraged, Aakash thrashes Dayananda and Chidananda in their house, which make the duo determined to kill Aakash. Nandini leaves for Hubli to her friend's wedding; Dayananda and Chidananda use this opportunity to kill Aakash, but they find Aakash catching the train compartment in which Nandini is onboard. Dayananda and Chidananda hire hitmen to kill Aakash in the compartment as they believe that Aakash will follow Nandini, but Aakash left the compartment and Nandini is followed by a person named Devu.

The hitmen secretly attack Devu and kill him. Aakash's purpose of arriving in Hubli is to convince Vishal's parents to reaccept Vishal and Asha's relationship. Nandini makes Vishal's parents accept the relationship. Aakash thanks Nandini for her help but declines her proposal as Nandini is from a rich family. Aakash takes Nandini back to her house and clears the misunderstandings with Dayananda and Chidananda. Nandini accepts the wedding proposal of her brother's choice and Chidananda hires Aakash as the wedding videographer on Nandini's request.

On the wedding day, Devu's father, who learnt that Dayananda and Chidananda are behind his son's death, tries to marry Nandini so that Devu will be reborn again. However, Aakash thrashes Devu's father and saves Nandini. Later, Chidananda and Dayananda request Aakash to marry Nandini. Aakash finally agrees and marries Nandini. Asha and Vishal also get married.

== Cast ==
- Puneeth Rajkumar as Aakash
- Ramya as Nandini, Aakash's love interest
- Avinash as Dayanand, Nandini's brother
- Ashish Vidyarthi as Nandini's fiancé
- Pavitra Lokesh as Mrs Dayanand
- Kishore as Chidanand; Nandini's brother
- Sundar Raj
- Tennis Krishna
- Honnavalli Krishna
- Pawan Kumar as Aakash's friend

== Production ==
The film marked the directorial debut of Mahesh Babu who earlier assisted Vijay Reddy, Kishore Sarja and M. S. Ramesh. The song "Oh Maria" was shot at Sri Rockline Studios.

== Soundtrack ==
Aakash

Soundtrack album by R. P. Patnaik
- Released: 8 March 2005
- Genre: Feature film soundtrack
- Length: 27:54
- Label: Jhankar Music
External audio
- Official Audio Jukebox on YouTube

R. P. Patnaik composed the film's background score and music for its soundtrack. The album consists of seven tracks. Lyrics for the 5 tracks were penned by K. Kalyan. And other 2 tracks, "Habba Habba" and "Hodi Hodi" penned by Sri Ranga and V. Nagendra Prasad respectively. The songs "Neene Neene" and "Aaha Entha Aa Kshana" became popular upon the audio release.

Tracklist
No.	Title	Lyrics	Singer(s)	Length
1.	"Aaha Entha Aa Kshana"	K. Kalyan	K. S. Chithra	4:58
2.	"Habba Habba"	Sri Ranga	Udit Narayan	4:30
3.	"Hodi Hodi"	V. Nagendra Prasad	Puneeth Rajkumar	4:32
4.	"Neene Neene"	K. Kalyan	Kunal Ganjawala	4:31
5.	"O Mariya"	K. Kalyan	Kunal Ganjawala	5:08
6.	"Yenidu E Dina"	K. Kalyan	Rajesh Krishnan	1:53
7.	"Aaha Entha Aa Kshana (Bit)"	K. Kalyan	Shreya Ghoshal	2:22
Total length:				27:54

== Reception ==
A critic from Sify wrote that "Akash is a clean family entertainer from the home production of Dr Rajkumar, the icon of Kannada cinema. Compared to his earlier four films, Puneeth Rajkumar has worked hard in this love story which has a message for the youth of today". A critic from Rediff.com wrote that "Akash is certainly an enjoyable film. Puneet's performance and Ramya's glamourous [sic] screen presence will remain in your memory for a long time".

== Box office ==
According to Sify, this was "Puneeth’s biggest hit as in Mysore, Bangalore and Hubli" and received "95 percent collections right from the day of its release". The film ran for more than two-hundred days.
