= Anukoolakkobba Ganda =

- Directed by: M. S. Rajashekar
- Written by: T. N. Narasimhan (story); Chi. Udayashankar (Dialogues)
- Produced by: S. A. Govindaraj
- Starring: Raghavendra Rajkumar; Vidhyashree; Lokesh
- Cinematography: V. K. Kannan
- Edited by: S. Manohar
- Music by: Upendra Kumar
- Distributed by: Nirupama Art Combines
- Release date: 1990
- Running time: 155 minutes
- Country: India
- Language: Kannada

Anukoolakkobba Ganda is a 1990 Indian Kannada-language film directed by M. S. Rajashekar. The film stars Raghavendra Rajkumar and Vidhyashree in lead roles. The music of the film was composed by Upendra Kumar. The film is a remake of Hindi movie Joroo Ka Ghulam. The film was a box office success.

== Cast ==
- Raghavendra Rajkumar as Raja
- Vidyashree as Radha, Raja's wife
- Lokesh as Verri Venkatramayya, Radha's father
- Girija Lokesh
- Prakash Rai
- Sudha Narasimharaju
- Sundarshree
- Rekha Das
- Sridevi
- Shyam Sunder

== Plot ==
Raja (Raghavendra Rajkumar) is a poor car mechanic who lives in a caravan. Though his aunt lives in a house near his garage, he lives in a caravan. Radha (Vidhyasree) is a wealthy girl, and one day she accidentally collides with the car that Raja was driving. Raja and Radha argue. Later Radha’s car break is spoiled and Raja has to repair it. Raja falls in love with her. Raja uses his assistant and gets her car spoiled every day and he goes and repairs it, seeing her. One day Radha gets to know of this and is furious with Raja. Radha has a college function and on the day of that function, Raja puts lose motion tablet in a drink and gives it to Gopi, who is the one who is going to dance with Radha in a function.

Raja goes and dances with Radha, and annoyed Radha hits Raja and Raja falls down. Raja is taken to a hospital. Raja pretends to be losing his eyesight and gets close to her. Radha discerns this drama but by that time she has fallen in love with him. Radha’s cousins, who are competing amongst themselves to marry Radha, discern this and informs this to Radha’s parents (Lokesh and Girija Lokesh). Radha’s father writes a fake letter that he is sick and makes Radha come. Once Radha comes, she discerns all of this was a deceit to make her come so that she does not marry that car mechanic. Radha fools her cousins and escapes, and marries Raja, who are living happily in the caravan.

Raja convinces Radha to go to her parents' house to seek their blessings, though Radha does not want it. Radha asks Raja to wait outside and goes inside the house, but Radha’s father insults her husband and says that he looks only for her money and property. Radha gets angry and leaves with Raja. Raja’s aunt tells Radha to lie about Raja becoming rich, and there is nothing wrong in claiming richness with people who value money over emotions. Radha starts writing letters to mother saying things like Raja started doing business, and became rich and purchased car, bungalow etc. Radha becomes pregnant and becomes a mother of a boy. Radha’s father changes his mind and wants to see his grandson. He informs Radha through letter that he would arrive to see the child. Raja had gone to Delhi to attend some conference, and when he comes he is shocked to see his wife taking him to a bungalow. Radha then tells Raja about how she had written letter saying things like he had become rich by doing business etc. Raja does not agree to do this kind of drama as to cover one lie, they have to lie many lies. She asks what to do, and Raja tells to rent a husband for two days and leaves. Radha then makes one of her friend’s brother to act as her husband. Radha’s parents arrive and sees that things are chaotic and attribute it to the lack of domestic help. On the other side, Raja’s aunt tells Raja that Radha did not do anything wrong in fact she had only told Radha to tell lies. Raja changes his mind and returns and when he learns of this arrangements, he settles there as domestic help (Cook).

Now the comedy of errors ensues around the bungalow with Radha, Raja, and fake Radha’s husband who is about to marry one of Radha’s another friend. Things go normally till two days later, when Radha's parents announce that they want to continue the stay to spend more time with their grandson and make him their heir. Their landlord, and people who gave the car and furniture on rent come to retrieve them. Moreover, Radha's cousins who expected that they would inherit property becomes bitter and kidnaps the child. Radha tells the truth to her parents, and they accept it. Radha’s grandfather is ready to give 5 Lakhs to the kidnappers and he is taken by a car. Here the two cousins ask Radha’s father to write property in their name. Raja comes and saves his child and his father-in-law's money. Finally Radha's parents buy a house, a car and furniture and ask forgiveness for not understanding Raja's character before. Raja accepts their apology but does not accept the property and tells that he did not marry her for their property. Radha’s father says that he respects his son-in-law’s self esteem and has written the property in his grandson’s name.

== Soundtrack ==
All songs are composed by Upendra Kumar.

=== Track list ===
#	Title	Singer(s)	Lyrics
1	"Ho Kande Suriva Maleya"	Raghavendra Rajkumar	Chi. Udayashankar
2	"Higgina Suggiyu"	Raghavendra Rajkumar, Manjula Gururaj	Sri Ranga
3	"Ayyo Oorella Ninna Huduki"	Raghavendra Rajkumar	Chi. Udayashankar
4	"Maleyinda Baanu Bhoomi"	Raghavendra Rajkumar, Manjula Gururaj	Chi. Udayashankar
5	"Kempu Deepa"	Raghavendra Rajkumar, G. S. Srinath, Manjula Gururaj, Kusuma	Chi. Udayashankar
