= Upendra Kumar =

Indian music composer

Background information
- Born: 18 July 1941; Madras, Madras Presidency, British India
- Origin: Orissa, India
- Died: 24 January 2002 (aged 60) Bangalore, Karnataka, India
- Genres: Film score, theatre
- Occupations: Composer, music director, instrumentalist
- Years active: 1966–2002
- Spouse: H. P. Geetha

Upendra Kumar (18 July 1941 – 24 January 2002) was an Indian composer who predominantly worked in Kannada films. He was known for his strong association with Rajkumar and his family and scored some of his career best compositions for the films featuring Rajkumar and his sons. He scored for 210 films mainly in Kannada, in addition to Odia, Tamil, Telugu, Malayalam and Tulu films.

== Early life ==
Kumar originally hailed from Digapahandi, a town in the present-day Odisha State of India. He was born in 1941 in Madras (now Chennai) in British India. His father, Lakshman Swamy was an astrologer. Kumar studied up to seventh Grade and shifted towards music learning with the help of his uncle, Apparao. He underwent rigorous training in Hindustani classical, Western instrumental and Indian stringed instruments. He graduated with a bachelor's degree in Indian classical music, Odissi music and the sitar from the Utkala College of Music and Dance. Upon graduation, he left for Madras looking for employment opportunities.

== Career ==
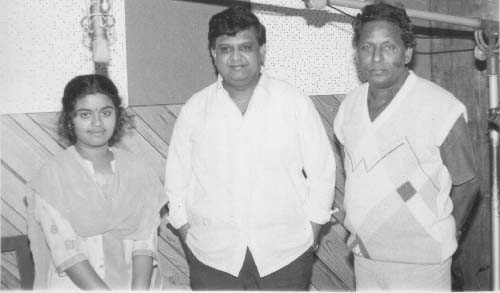
Kumar (right) with S. P. Balasubrahmanyam (center) and Sangeetha Katti (left) during a recording.

Once in Madras, Kumar took music classes in vocals and the sitar. An impressed film director Y. R. Swamy, with his "teaching methodology and his flair for music", signed him to score for his 1966 film Katari Veera, which had Rajkumar playing the lead role. Two tracks from the soundtrack album, "Chengu Chengendu Haaruva" and "Haayaada Ee Sangama" became popular.

Songs from films for which he scored that became popular included Sipayi Ramu (1972), Premada Kanike (1976), Shankar Guru (1978), Dharmasere (1979), Ravichandra (1980), Kaamana Billu (1983), Ratha Sapthami (1986), Nanjundi Kalyana (1989), Hrudaya Haadithu (1991), and Jeevana Chaitra (1992). Kumar frequently collaborated with Rajkumar who playback-sung many songs for films that mostly starred himself, and picturised on him. Popular numbers of this combination included "Chinna Baalalli", "Love Me or Hate Me" and "Cheluveya Nota Chenna" from Shankar Guru, "Idhu Rama Mandira" from Ravichandra, "Indu Aananda" from Kaamana Billu, "Lakshmi Baaramma" and "Manavanaagi Huttidamele" from Jeevana Chaitra, "Naliyuthaa" from Hrudaya Haadithu and "Saptapadi Idu Saptapadi" from Saptapadi (1992). Other collaborations included with singers C. Aswath ("Negilahidida" from Kaamana Billu), Manjula Gururaj ("Olage Seridare Gundu" from Nanjundi Kalyana) and S. P. Balasubrahmanyam, who also sang many non-film devotional songs composed by Kumar. "Naadamaya" from Jeevana Chaitra fetched Rajkumar the National Film Award for Best Male Playback Singer. Lyrics for most tracks of the Upendra Kumar–Rajkumar combination were written by Chi. Udayashankar.

The mandolin and the sitar were prominently used in Kumar's instrumentation, and he was particularly fond of Kafi raga with melodies deriving from that scale. "Idu Yaaru Bareda Katheyo" from Premada Kanike was based on this raga.

Kumar won the Karnataka State Film Award for Best Music Director three times (for Nanjundi Kalyana, Hrudaya Haadithu and Jeevana Chaitra) before he stopped composing for films in the mid- to late-1990s. His health deteriorated during this time and died in 2002 with the Kannada film Vishwamithra (2001) being his last work. Srikanth Srinivasa of Deccan Herald, in a tribute, wrote of Kumar's last days, "With the advent of new wave music directors, Upendra Kumar was relegated to the background and found himself out of work and forgotten by the Kannada film industry. Besides, he has scored music for Dharma Devathe which was released recently. He has also scored music for Dr Rajkumar's private devotional albums."

=== Work in Odia films ===
Alongside Kannada, Kumar notably worked also in Odia films and scored for more than 25 films. They included Dharitri (1972), Mana Akasha (1974), Punarmilana (1977),"Kavi Samrat Upendra Bhanja"(1978) and Alibha Daga (1980). His music became very popular in Odisha. A book titled Sajala Smruti was released in 2009 in memory of Kumar's work in Odia films.

== Personal life ==
Kumar was married to singer H. P. Geetha, sister of Kannada film actress H. P. Saroja.

== Death ==
Upendra Kumar died on 24 January 2002 of jaundice in Bangalore, aged 60.

== Awards ==
- 1990 – Karnataka State Film Award for Best Music Director – Nanjundi Kalyana
- 1992 – Karnataka State Film Award for Best Music Director – Hrudaya Haadithu
- 1993 – Karnataka State Film Award for Best Music Director – Jeevana Chaitra

== Discography ==
=== Kannada ===
Year	Film title	Notes
1966	Katari Veera	Debut film as a composer
1967	Muddu Meena	
1969	Ade Hrudaya Ade Mamathe	
1969	Chowkada Deepa	
1970	Hasiru Thorana	
1970	Namma Mane	
1970	Paropakari	
1971	Hennu Honnu Mannu	
1972	Sipayi Ramu	
1973	Thriveni	
1975	Namma Oora Devaru	
1975	Nanjunda Nakkaga	
1975	Aashirvada	
1976	Premada Kanike	
1978	Shankar Guru	
1978	Suli	
1978	Aathma Shakthi	
1979	Mangala	
1979	Dharmasere	
1980	Ravichandra	
1980	Hrudaya Deepa	
1980	Manjina There	
1980	Nyaya Neethi Dharma	
1981	Prachanda Putanigalu	
1981	Maha Prachandaru	
1981	Shreeman	
1982	Andada Aramane	
1982	Mareyalagada Kathe	
1982	Praya Praya Praya	
1983	Kaamana Billu	
1983	Gandharvagiri	
1984	Onti Dhwani	
1984	Hennina Sowbhagya	
1984	Apoorva Sangama	
1984	Ayyappa Sharanu	
1985	Nee Nakkaga	
1985	Pavithra Papi	
1985	Dhruva Thare	
1985	Thulasidala	
1986	Anuraga Aralithu	
1986	Aparadhi Nanalla	
1986	Ratha Sapthami	
1987	Manamecchida Hudugi	
1988	Devatha Manushya	
1988	Chiranjeevi Sudhakara	
1989	Kalabhimani	
1989	Nanjundi Kalyana	Karnataka State Film Award for Best Music Director
1989	Bala Hombale	
1989	Deva	
1989	Gajapathi Garvabhanga	
1990	Ranabheri	
1990	Aasegobba Meesegobba	
1990	Rudra Tandava	
1990	Pundara Ganda	
1990	Swarna Samsara	
1990	Mruthyunjaya	
1990	Challenge Gopalakrishna	
1990	Bhale Chatura	
1990	Raja Kempu Roja	
1990	Anukoolakkobba Ganda	
1990	Ivalentha Hendthi	
1991	Lion Jagapathi Rao	
1991	Prema Pareekshe	
1991	Hrudaya Haadithu	Karnataka State Film Award for Best Music Director
1991	Aralida Hoovugalu	
1991	Golmaal Part 2	
1991	Kitturina Huli	
1991	Thavarumane Udugore	
1991	C. B. I. Shiva	
1991	Rollcall Radhakrishna	
1991	Readymade Ganda	
1991	Gandu Sidigundu	
1991	Kalla Malla	
1991	Halli Rambhe Belli Bombe	
1991	Kalyana Mantapa	
1991	Gruhapravesha	
1991	Mathru Bhagya	
1991	Kollur Kala	
1992	Banni Ondsala Nodi	
1992	Bombat Hendthi	
1992	Amara Prema	
1992	Midida Shruthi	
1992	Hendtheere Hushar	
1992	Belli Modagalu	
1992	Sindhoora Thilaka	
1992	Goonda Rajya	
1992	Sapthapadi	
1992	Ravivarma	
1992	Kanasina Rani	
1992	Jeevana Chaitra	Karnataka State Film Award for Best Music Director
1992	Roshagara	
1992	Mana Mecchida Sose	
1992	Bharjari Gandu	
1992	Gharshane	
1993	Olavina Kanike	
1993	Chikki Chandrama	
1993	Dharmapeeta	
1993	Bhagawan Sri Saibaba	
1993	Navibbaru Namagibbaru	
1994	Odahuttidavaru	
1994	Apoorva Samsara	
1994	Mandyada Gandu	
1994	Sagara Deepa	
1994	Hettha Karulu	
1995	Shravana Sanje	
1995	Thumbida Mane	
1995	Mana Midiyithu	
1996	Rambo Raja Revolver Rani	
1996	Samayakkondu Sullu	
1996	Muddina Sose	
1996	Rambha Rajyadalli Rowdy	
1997	Gandede Bhaira	
1997	Ellaranthalla Nanna Ganda	
1998	Vajra	
2002	Dharma Devathe	
2002	Vishwamithra	

=== Odia ===
- Manika
- Kabi Samrat Upendra Bhanja
- Samarpana
- Pipasha
- Kula Chandrama
- Ae Nuhen Kahani
- Mana Akasha
- Dharithri
- Alibha Daga
- Parivara
- Palataka
- Pati Patni
- Punar Milana

== See also ==
- Rajkumar
- G. K. Venkatesh
- Vijaya Bhaskar
- M. Ranga Rao
- Manjula Gururaj
