= Girija Lokesh =

Indian Kannada theatre, film actress

- Born: Girija; 10 January 1951 (age 75)
- Occupations: Actress, film producer
- Years active: 1973–present
- Spouse: Lokesh (1975–2004)
- Children: Srujan Lokesh (son); Pooja Lokesh (daughter)

Girija Lokesh is an Indian theatre and film actress and occasional film producer who works in Kannada cinema. She is wife of actor Lokesh, and is the mother of actor and television presenter Srujan Lokesh and Pooja Lokesh. In recognition of her contribution towards Kannada cinema, she was honoured with Rajyotsava Award by the Government of Karnataka in 2013.

== Early life ==
Girija Lokesh was born on January 10, 1951, to businessman S P Swamy and Poornima. She grew up in Bengaluru and completed her schooling at Janata High School. When she was in the eighth grade, her father faced a huge business loss from which he could not recover. Girija started her career at a young age as a dance instructor, having learned music and dance as a child. Before making her acting debut in the film industry, Girija acted in hundreds of plays including those by Shishuvihara, Rangasampada, and Natarang. Besides Kannada plays, she also worked in Urdu, Tamil, Telugu, and Malayalam plays. Her acting debut in the Kannada film industry was with the 1973 movie Abachurina Post Office, which went to win the 21st National Film Award. She later worked in films like Kakana Kote, Halli Meshtru and Bhoteyyana Mommaga Ayyu. In 2022, she was roped in for the Kannada television series Jenugoodu that airs on Star Suvarna.

== Partial filmography ==
=== As actress ===
- Abachurina Post Office (1973)
- Maadi Madidavaru (1974)
- Kakana Kote (1977)
- Simhasana (1983)
- Chiranjeevi Sudhakar (1988)
- Nanjundi Kalyana (1989)
- Challenge Gopalakrishna (1990)
- Anukoolakkobba Ganda (1990)
- Ramachaari (1991)
- Halli Meshtru (1992)
- Mana Mecchida Sose (1992)...Padmavati
- Snehada Kadalalli (1992)
- Belliyappa Bangarappa (1992)
- Mannina Doni (1992)...Janaki
- Gadibidi Ganda (1993)
- Muddina Maava (1993)
- Yarigu Helbedi (1994)
- Ulta Palta (1997)
- Ganga Yamuna (1997)
- Rambhe Urvashi Menake (1999)
- Gattimela (2001)
- Savira Mettilu (2006)
- Ekadantha (2007)
- Nanda Loves Nanditha (2008)
- Aithalakkadi (2010)
- Bindaas Hudugi (2010)
- Sidlingu (2012)... Rangamma
- Manjunatha BA LLB (2012)
- Snehitaru (2012)
- Sangolli Rayanna (2012)
- Bhajarangi (2013)
- Jasmine 5 (2014)
- Gajakesari (2014)
- Preethiyinda (2015)
- Bullet Basya (2015)
- Krishna-Rukku (2016)
- Kiragoorina Gayyaligalu (2016)
- John Jani Janardhan (2016)
- Style Raja (2017)
- Bhootayyana Mommaga Ayyu (2018)
- Onti (TBA)
- Seetharama Kalyana (2019)
- Selfie Mummy Googl Daddy (2020)
- Pogaru (2021)
- Junior (2025)
- GST (2025)

=== As producer ===
- Karune Illada Kanoonu (1983)

== Television appearances ==
Title	Year	Channel	Role	Ref.
Jothe Jotheyali	2014	Zee Kannada	Heroine mother	
Chota Champion	2014	Zee Kannada	Participant	
Majaa Talkies	2015	Colors Kannada	As guest	
Subbalakshmi Samsara	2017–2020	Zee Kannada		
Ivalu Sujatha	2019–2020	Colors Kannada	Vanamala	
Sathya	2020–present	Zee Kannada	Sathya's grandmother	
Sundari	2022	Udaya TV	Special appearance	
Jenugudu	2022	Star Suvarna	Girijakka	
Preetiya Arasi	2023–present	Udaya TV		
