= Manjula Gururaj =

Indian playback singer

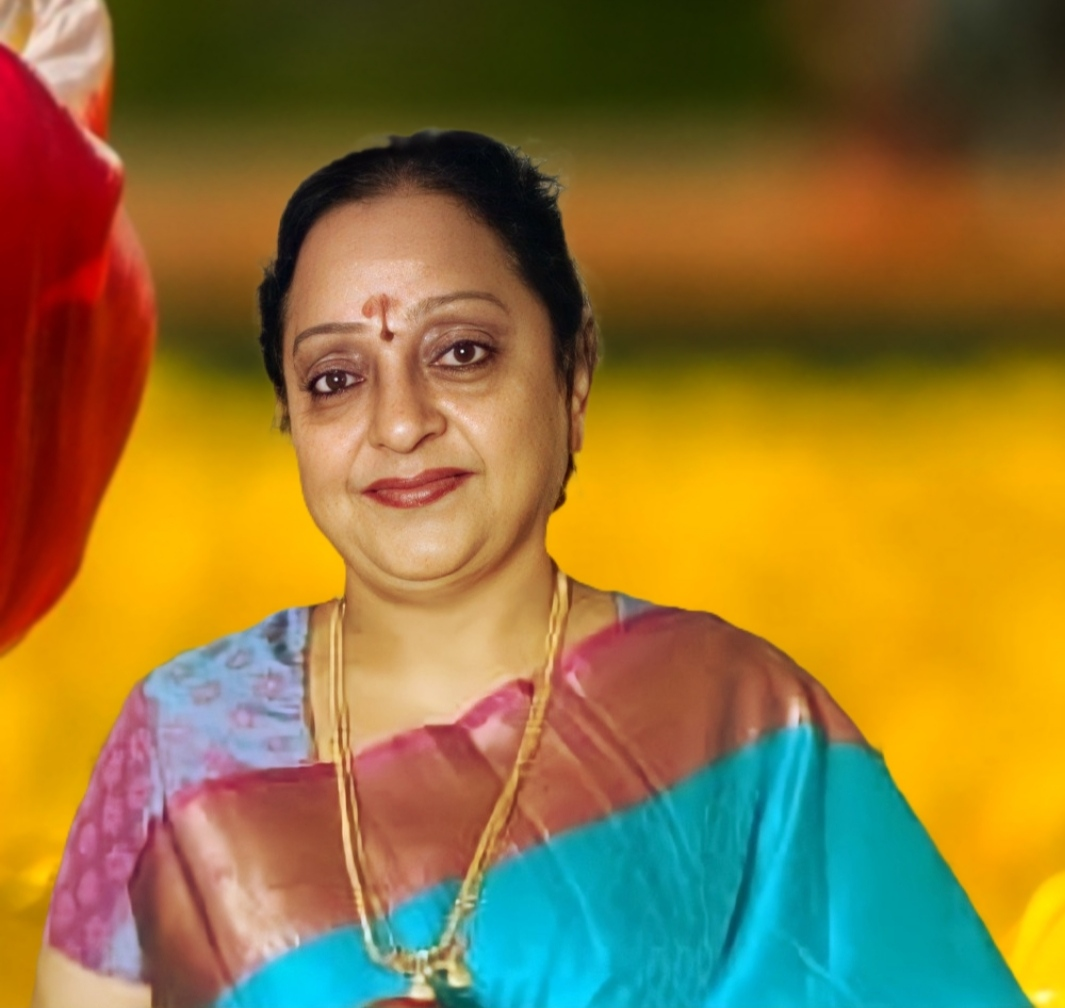
- Manjula in 2020

Background information
- Born: Manjula R. June 10, 1959 (age 66); Bangalore, Karnataka, India
- Genres: Playback singing, Indian classical
- Occupations: singer; dubbing artist
- Instrument: Vocals
- Years active: 1983–present

Manjula Gururaj (Kannada: ಮಂಜುಳಾ ಗುರುರಾಜ್) (born 10 June 1959) is an Indian playback singer, voice-over artist, television anchor, and music educator, primarily associated with Kannada cinema. She is widely recognized for her versatile singing style and has recorded over 2,000 film songs and more than 12,500 non-film tracks across devotional, folk, and light music genres.

Active since the early 1980s, Manjula has collaborated with leading composers and lent her voice to numerous chart-topping Kannada songs, earning critical acclaim and multiple state awards. She is a recipient of the Karnataka State Film Award for Best Female Playback Singer (1993–94), the Karnataka Rajyotsava Award (2010), and the Kempegowda Award (2019), and the Karnataka State Special Jury Award for her dubbing performance in Beladingala Baale (1995), among other honors. Apart from Kannada, she has recorded songs in Telugu, Tamil, Malayalam, Hindi, and Tulu language films.

In addition to her singing career, she has worked as a news anchor for Akashvani and Doordarshan. Manjula, along with her husband Gururaj, established "Sadhana Music School" in Bengaluru, which trains aspiring vocalists in light and classical music.

== Early life ==
Manjula Gururaj was born on 10 June 1959 in Mysore, Karnataka, into a family with a strong musical background. Her father, Dr. M. N. Ramanna, was a noted mridangam player, which exposed her to classical rhythms and nurtured her interest in music from an early age. She received formal training in both Carnatic and Hindustani classical music, laying the foundation for her versatile singing career. Manjula completed her education in Mysore and later earned a degree in science from Bangalore University, balancing academics with her growing passion for music.

== Career ==
=== Early 1980s: Orchestra singing and News anchoring ===
Before establishing herself as a playback singer, Manjula was actively involved in music through orchestras and live stage performances. She also worked as a news anchor and announcer with Akashvani (All India Radio) from 1981 to 1983, and later with Doordarshan, Bengaluru until 1998, where she presented news and cultural programs.

During this period, she collaborated with her husband Gururaj in a popular light music troupe called "Sound of Music", which performed across Karnataka and became a steppingstone for her entry into the Kannada film industry. These engagements allowed her to refine her singing style and build a strong network in the music fraternity, paving the way for her playback debut in 1984.

=== Playback singer ===
==== 1980s: Playback debut and breakthrough ====
Manjula Gururaj made her playback debut in the 1984 Kannada film Rowdy Raja, composed by Satyam. Her solo song, “Naguvudanu Kaliyuveya”, for the film marked her emergence in the industry. Composer Vijay Anand recorded her first female duet with S. Janaki for the film Brahma Gantu (1985).

In 1988, Manjula recorded her first duet with actor-singer Dr. Rajkumar for the film Devatha Manushya. The song "Hrudayadali Idenidu", composed by Upendra Kumar featured Rajkumar and Geetha reached the popularity and paved the way for successful collaboration with both Upendra Kumar and Rajkumar. Her biggest breakthrough came in 1989 with the song "Olage Seridare Gundu", composed again by Upendra Kumar, for the film Nanjundi Kalyana. Manjula noted that the song's success made her "a household name," inspiring her to explore more “drunken and item songs” that showcased expressive delivery. She cited singer Asha Bhonsle's rendition of the song "Aao Huzoor Tumko" as a significant inspiration while recording the song. The song resonated widely with audiences and established her as a distinctive playback voice in Kannada cinema. The song also marked the beginning of her collaboration with actress Malashri, for whom she recorded many songs in future years. In the same year, she contributed to the soundtrack album of Gajapathi Garvabhanga by performing four tracks, including the solo "Jataka Kudure Hatthi", which again cemented the success of her association with the composer and the actress. This continued success led to the expansion of her singing for leading composers of the time such as G. K. Venkatesh, Rajan-Nagendra, Vijaya Bhaskar, Shankar Ganesh and Hamsalekha.

==== 1990s & 2000s: Established singer ====
Following the success of Nanjundi Kalyana and Gajapathi Garvabhanga, Manjula was the most sought after singer in major productions, particularly in Vajreshwari Combines and Poornima Enterprises, led by Parvathamma Rajkumar. The films, financed by the production houses employing Manjula as the major female singer in soundtrack albums, include Ranaranga (1988), Parashuram (1989), Ade Raaga Ade Haadu (1989), Mruthyunjaya (1990), Aasegobba Meesegobba (1990), Anukoolakkobba Ganda (1990), Aralida Hoovugalu (1991), Jeevana Chaitra (1992), Midida Shruthi (1992), Aakasmika (1993), Anuragada Alegalu (1993), Odahuttidavaru (1994) and Shabdavedhi (2000).

In 1994, Manjula received the Karnataka State Film Award for Best Female Playback Singer from Government of Karnataka for her soft lullaby, "Myale Kavkonda Mungara Moda”, composed by C. Ashwath for the film Chinnari Mutha (1993). Her collaboration with composer Hamsalekha began with Anjada Gandu (1988) and throughout 1990s, the combination produced several popular songs in albums including Sangliyana (1989), Hosa Jeevana (1990), Chaitrada Premanjali (1992), Purushotthama (1992), Solillada Saradara (1993), Kalyana Rekhe (1993) among others. During the 1990s, Manjula made successful collaborations with music directors namely Ilaiyaraaja, Raj-Koti, V. Manohar, S. P. Venkatesh and Sadhu Kokila. Her contributions to the V. Manohar composed soundtrack Janumada Jodi (1996) brought her several accolades. After this, she cut down her film singing assignments and shifted focus towards devotionals and non-film songs.

==== 2010s: Break and comeback ====
After a hiatus of nearly ten years, Manjula made a comeback to the playback singing through V. Harikrishna composed song "Aakalbenne" for the film Shravani Subramanya.

== Personal life ==
Manjula married Gururaj, an orchestra singer, in 1979. The couple have two children: a daughter named Sangeetha and a son named Sagar. In 1991, they founded Sadhana Music School in Bengaluru, offering training in both classical and light music. The school has multiple branches across the city.

== Awards ==
- 2019 – Kempegowda Award by BBMP.
- 2010 – Karnataka Rajyotsava Award by the Government of Karnataka
- 1993–94 – Karnataka State Film Award for Best Female Playback Singer for the song "Myale kavkonda mungara moda" from the movie Chinnari Mutha.
