= Hamsalekha discography =

This is a discography of South Indian composer and lyricist Hamsalekha. As of 2013, he has scored music for about 324 Kannada films and few Telugu and Tamil films.

== Discography ==
Year	Film	Language	Notes
1973	Triveni	Kannada	As lyricist for the song "Neena Bhagavantha"
1981	Rahuchandra	Kannada	Unreleased film As director, story writer and lyricist
1985	Naanu Nanna Hendthi	Kannada	As dialogue writer and lyricist
1986	Henne Ninagenu Bandhana	Kannada	As a full-fledged music director and lyricist
1987	Premaloka	Kannada	Also dialogue writer
1987	Paruva Ragam	Tamil	
1987	Mr. Raja	Kannada	
1987	Antima Theerpu	Kannada	
1987	Digvijaya	Kannada	
1987	Bedi	Kannada	
1987	Sangrama	Kannada	
1987	Daivashakti	Kannada	
1988	Avale Nanna Hendthi	Kannada	
1988	Ranadheera	Kannada	Also dialogue writer
1988	Prema Tapaswi	Kannada	
1988	Vijaya Khadga	Kannada	Only as a music director
1988	Sangliyana	Kannada	
1988	Mathrudevobhava	Kannada	Only as a music director
1988	Anjada Gandu	Kannada	
1988	Balondu Bhavageethe	Kannada	
1988	Jadikketha Moodi	Tamil	
1988	Ranaranga	Kannada	
1988	Dharma Pathni	Kannada	
1988	Pelli Chesi Choodu	Telugu	
1988	Kodi Parakuthu	Tamil	
1988	Puthiya Vaanam	Tamil	
1988	Kirathaka	Kannada	
1989	Muthyamantha Muddu	Telugu	
1989	Anantana Avantara	Kannada	
1989	Yuddha Kaanda	Kannada	
1989	Idhu Unga Kudumbam	Tamil	
1989	Avane Nanna Ganda	Kannada	Also as Story writer
1989	Amanusha	Kannada	
1989	Yuga Purusha	Kannada	Also as dialogue writer
1989	Sura Sundaranga	Kannada	
1989	Indrajith	Kannada	
1989	Arthanaadam	Telugu	
1989	C.B.I. Shankar	Kannada	
1989	Kindari Jogi	Kannada	
1989	Singari Bangari	Kannada	
1989	Onti Salaga	Kannada	
1989	Neram Nadi Kadu	Telugu	
1989	Agni	Telugu	
1989	Narasimha	Kannada	
1989	Parashurama	Kannada	
1989	Poli Huduga	Kannada	
1989	Premagni	Kannada	
1990	Kaliyuga Abhimanyudu	Telugu	
1990	Nammoora Hammera	Kannada	
1990	S. P. Sangliyana Part 2	Kannada	
1990	Kempu Gulabi	Kannada	
1990	Trinetra	Kannada	
1990	Aavesha	Kannada	
1990	Velai Kidaichiduchu	Tamil	
1990	Bannada Gejje	Kannada	
1990	Prema Yuddham	Telugu	
1990	Hosa Jeevana	Kannada	
1990	Muthina Haara	Kannada	
1990	Sididedda Gandu	Kannada	
1990	Abhimanyu	Kannada	
1990	Rani Maharani	Kannada	
1990	Prathap	Kannada	
1990	Aata Bombaata	Kannada	
1990	Anantha Prema	Kannada	
1990	Nigooda Rahasya	Kannada	
1990	College Hero	Kannada	
1990	Bhujangayyana Dashavathara	Kannada	
1991	Hathyakanda	Kannada	
1991	Ajagajantara	Kannada	
1991	Punda Prachanda	Kannada	
1991	Neenu Nakkare Haalu Sakkare	Kannada	
1991	Ide Police Belt	Kannada	
1991	Garuda Dhwaja	Kannada	
1991	Navathaare	Kannada	
1991	S. P. Bhargavi	Kannada	
1991	Ramachaari	Kannada	Filmfare Award for Best Music Director
1991	Shanti Kranti	Kannada	
1991	Shanti Kranti	Telugu	
1991	Shanti Kranti	Hindi	
1991	Nattukku Oru Nallavan	Tamil	
1991	Puksatte Ganda Hotte Thumba Unda	Kannada	
1991	Rowdy & MLA	Kannada	
1991	Veera Dheera	Kannada	
1991	Anatha Rakshaka	Kannada	
1991	Theja	Kannada	
1991	Shivaraj	Kannada	
1991	Kaliyuga Bheema	Kannada	
Nayaka	Kannada		
1992	Ankuram	Telugu	
1992	Belli Kalungura	Kannada	
1992	Chaitrada Premanjali	Kannada	
1992	Chitralekha	Kannada	
1992	Entede Bhanta	Kannada	
1992	Halli Meshtru	Kannada	Also as dialogue writer
1992	Ksheera Sagara	Kannada	
1992	Vajrayudha	Kannada	
1992	Purushotthama	Kannada	
1992	Solillada Saradara	Kannada	
1992	Gopi Krishna	Kannada	
1992	Sahasi	Kannada	
1992	Nanna Thangi	Kannada	
1992	Hosa Kalla Hale Kulla	Kannada	
1992	Police File	Kannada	
1992	Guru Brahma	Kannada	
1992	Gandharva	Kannada	Also as Story, Screenplay and Dialogue writer
1992	Chikkejamanru	Kannada	
1992	Mannina Doni	Kannada	
1992	Marana Mrudanga	Kannada	
1992	Jhenkara	Kannada	
1992	Mallige Hoove	Kannada	
1992	Sriramachandra	Kannada	
1992	Rajakeeya	Kannada	
1992	Aathanka	Kannada	
1993	Mangalya Bandhana	Kannada	
1993	Gadibidi Ganda	Kannada	
1993	Anuragada Alegalu	Kannada	
1993	Captain Magal	Tamil	
1993	Shrungara Kavya	Kannada	
1993	Sarkarakke Saval	Kannada	
1993	Annayya	Kannada	
1993	Aakasmika	Kannada	Filmfare Award for Best Music Director
1993	Midida Hrudayagalu	Kannada	
1993	Hrudaya Bandhana	Kannada	
1993	Chirabandhavya	Kannada	
1993	Mane Devru	Kannada	
1993	Hoovu Hannu	Kannada	
1993	Kadambari	Kannada	
1993	Munjaneya Manju	Kannada	
1993	Shrungara Raja	Kannada	
1993	Golibaar	Kannada	
1993	Kalyana Rekhe	Kannada	
1993	Wanted	Kannada	
1993	Kumkuma Bhagya	Kannada	
1993	Mojina Maduve	Kannada	
1993	Jailor Jagannath	Kannada	
1993	Bhagawan Sri Saibaba	Kannada	
1993	Apoorva Jodi	Kannada	
1993	Baa Nalle Madhuchandrake	Kannada	
1993	Bevu Bella	Kannada	
1993	Kempaiah IPS	Kannada	
1993	Rupayi Raja	Kannada	
1993	Mouna Sangrama	Kannada	
1994	Karulina Koogu	Kannada	
1994	Chinna Nee Naguthiru	Kannada	
1994	Chinna	Kannada	
1994	Musuku	Kannada	
1994	Time Bomb	Kannada	
1994	Sammilana	Kannada	
1994	Rasika	Kannada	
1994	Samrat	Kannada	
1994	Mahakshathriya	Kannada	
1994	Gopi Kalyana	Kannada	
1994	Megha Maale	Kannada	
1994	Sididedda Pandavaru	Kannada	
1994	Makkala Sakshi	Kannada	
1994	Halunda Tavaru	Kannada	Filmfare Award for Best Music Director; Karnataka State Film Award for Best Music Director; Karnataka State Film Award for Best Lyricist
1994	Lockup Death	Kannada	
1994	Hongirana	Kannada	
1994	Mutthanna	Kannada	
1994	Jaana	Kannada	
1994	Srigandha	Kannada	
1995	Putnanja	Kannada	
1995	Professor	Kannada	
1995	Mutthinantha Hendathi	Kannada	
1995	Kona Edaithe	Kannada	
1995	Satya Jwale	Kannada	
1995	Mojugara Sogasugara	Kannada	
1995	Thayi Illada Tavaru	Kannada	
1995	Dheerga Sumangali	Kannada	
1995	Om	Kannada	
1995	Eshwar	Kannada	
1995	Kalyanotsava	Kannada	
1995	Thungabadhra	Kannada	
1995	Madhura Maitri	Kannada	
1995	Sangeetha Sagara Ganayogi Panchakshara Gavai	Kannada	National Film Award for Best Music Direction; Karnataka State Film Award for Best Music Director
1995	Police Power	Kannada	
1995	Chiranjeevi Rajegowda	Kannada	
1995	Dore	Kannada	
1995	Mr. Abhishek	Kannada	
1995	Himapatha	Kannada	
1995	Mr. Vasu	Kannada	
1995	Naviloora Naidile	Kannada	
1995	Preethiya Udugore	Kannada	
1996	Veera Bhadra	Kannada	
1996	Hetthavaru	Kannada	
1996	Hello Daddy	Kannada	
1996	Sipayi	Kannada	
1996	Mouna Raaga	Kannada	
1996	Circle Inspector	Kannada	
1996	Geluvina Saradara	Kannada	
1996	Stunt Master	Kannada	
1996	Karpoorada Gombe	Kannada	
1996	Pooja	Kannada	
1996	Thaali Pooje	Kannada	
1996	Soothradhara	Kannada	
1996	Palegara	Kannada	
1996	Sthree	Kannada	
1997	Kalavida	Kannada	
1997	Lakshmi Mahalakshmi	Kannada	
1997	Simhada Mari	Kannada	
1997	Omkaram	Telugu	
1997	Kodagina Kaveri	Kannada	
1997	Halliyadarenu Shiva	Kannada	
1997	Shivaranjani	Kannada	
1997	Mommaga	Kannada	
1997	Lady Commissioner	Kannada	
1997	Prema Geethe	Kannada	
1997	Cheluva	Kannada	
1998	Thutta Mutta	Kannada	
1998	Andaman	Kannada	
1998	Yaare Neenu Cheluve	Kannada	Filmfare Award for Best Music Director
1998	Dayadi	Kannada	
1998	Suvvi Suvvalali	Kannada	
1998	Gadibidi Krishna	Kannada	
1998	Preethsod Thappa	Kannada	
1998	Kowrava	Kannada	
1999	Chandrodaya	Kannada	
1999	Tuvvi Tuvvi Tuvvi	Kannada	
1999	Rambhe Urvashi Menake	Kannada	
1999	Sambhrama	Kannada	
1999	Habba	Kannada	
1999	Drona	Kannada	
1999	Coolie Raja	Kannada	
1999	Channappa Channegowda	Kannada	
1999	AK 47	Kannada; Telugu	
1999	Nannaseya Hoove	Kannada	
1999	Premachari	Kannada	
1999	Vishwa	Kannada	
1999	Meese Hottha Gandasige Demandappo Demandu	Kannada	
1999	Hrudaya Hrudaya	Kannada	
1999	Khalanayaka	Kannada	
1999	Patela	Kannada	
1999	Karadipura	Kannada	
1999	Arunodaya	Kannada	
1999	Dalawayi	Kannada	
1999	Snehaloka	Kannada	
1999	Suggi	Kannada	also director; unreleased
2000	Yare Nee Abhimani	Kannada	
2000	Preethse	Kannada	Filmfare Award for Best Music Director
2000	Naga Devathe	Kannada	
2000	Hats Off India	Kannada	
2000	Shabdavedhi	Kannada	
2000	Hagalu Vesha	Kannada	
2000	Soorappa	Kannada	
2000	Sulthan	Kannada	
2000	Tiger Padmini	Kannada	
2000	Chamundi	Kannada	
2000	Yaarige Saluthe Sambala	Kannada	
2000	Devara Maga	Kannada	
2000	Asthra	Kannada	
2000	Sparsha	Kannada	
2000	Bharatha Nari	Kannada	
2000	Bannada Hejje	Kannada	
2000	Naxalite	Kannada	
2001	Diggajaru	Kannada	
2001	Lankesha	Kannada	
2001	Gattimela	Kannada	
2001	Kurigalu Saar Kurigalu	Kannada	
2001	Ellara Mane Dosenu	Kannada	
2001	Shaapa	Kannada	Also as Story writer
2001	Avarna Bit Ivarna Bit Avaryaaru?	Kannada	
2001	Sri Manjunatha	Kannada	Karnataka State Film Award for Best Lyricist; Partially reshot in Telugu
2001	Baava Baamaida	Kannada	
2001	Mr. Harischandra	Kannada	
2001	Kothigalu Saar Kothigalu	Kannada	
2002	Parva	Kannada	
2002	Preethi Mado Hudugarigella	Kannada	
2002	Dakota Express	Kannada	
2002	Super Star	Kannada	
2002	Balarama	Kannada	
2002	Nagarahavu	Kannada	
2002	Joot	Kannada	
2002	Chelvi	Kannada	
2002	Romeo Juliet	Kannada	
2002	Tapori	Kannada	
2002	Kambalahalli	Kannada	
2002	Thavarige Baa Thangi	Kannada	
2002	Cheluve Ondu Heltheeni	Kannada	
2002	Balagalittu Olage Baa	Kannada	
2002	Roja	Kannada	
2003	Dumbee	Kannada	
2003	Bangalore Bundh	Kannada	
2003	Katthegalu Saar Katthegalu	Kannada	
2003	Devara Makkalu	Kannada	
2003	Kiccha	Kannada	
2003	Ramaswamy Krishnaswamy	Kannada	
2003	Thayi Illada Thabbali	Kannada	
2003	Nanjundi	Kannada	
2003	Jogula	Kannada	
2003	Lovve Pasagali	Kannada	
2003	Hrudayavantha	Kannada	
2003	Ondagona Baa	Kannada	
2003	Bala Shiva	Kannada	
2003	Sri Renukadevi	Kannada	
2004	Dharma	Kannada	
2004	Durgi	Kannada	
2004	Gowdru	Kannada	
2004	Sarvabhouma	Kannada	
2005	Shanti	Kannada	
2005	Nan Love Madtiya	Kannada	
2005	Anna Thangi	Kannada	
2005	Nenapirali	Kannada	Filmfare Award for Best Music Director; Karnataka State Film Award for Best Music Director; Sunfeast Udaya Film Award for Best Music Director
2006	Thutturi	Kannada	
2006	Thavarina Siri	Kannada	
2006	Mohini 9886788888	Kannada	
2006	Pandavaru	Kannada	
2006	Kallarali Hoovagi	Kannada	
2007	Sixer	Kannada	
2007	Sri Dhanamma Devi	Kannada	
2007	Sri Kshetra Kaivara Thathayya	Kannada	
2007	Soundarya	Kannada	
2007	Janapada	Kannada	
2007	Meera Madhava Raghava	Kannada	
2007	Gunavantha	Kannada	
2007	Naanu Neenu Jodi	Kannada	
2008	Honganasu	Kannada	
2008	Bandhu Balaga	Kannada	
2008	Navashakthi Vaibava	Kannada	
2008	Thaayi	Kannada	
2008	Darode	Kannada	
2008	Sangaathi	Kannada	
2008	Yuga Yugagale Saagali	Kannada	
2009	Nam Yajamanru	Kannada	
2009	Kannadada Kiran Bedi	Kannada	
2009	Yodha	Kannada	
2009	Kabaddi	Kannada	
2009	Rajani	Kannada	
2009	Devaru Kotta Thangi	Kannada	
2010	Mukhaputa	Kannada	
2010	Premism	Kannada	
2010	Naanu Nanna Kanasu	Kannada	
2010	Appu and Pappu	Kannada	
2010	Bhagavathi Kadu	Kannada	
2011	Puttakkana Highway	Kannada	
2012	Narasimha	Kannada	
2012	Dakota Picture	Kannada	
2012	Nandeesha	Kannada	
2013	Veera	Kannada	
2013	Election	Kannada	
2013	Raja Huli	Kannada	
2016	Devara Nadalli	Kannada	
2016	Re	Kannada	
2016	Mahaveera Machideva	Kannada	
2016	Kuchiku Kuchiku	Kannada	
2022	Pampa Panchalli Parashivamurthy	Kannada	

== See also ==
- Hamsalekha
