= List of songs recorded by Latha Hamsalekha =

Latha, commonly known as Latha Hamsalekha, is an Indian playback singer in Kannada. She is married to composer Hamsalekha. For her song Aa Arunodaya Chanda in the movie Arunodaya, Latha was awarded the Karnataka State Film Award for Best Female Playback Singer in 1999–2000. She has sung over 200 songs in Kannada. The following is a complete list of her songs:

== Kannada ==
Year	Film	Song	Music	Co-singers	Ref.
1987	Premaloka	"Nodamma Hudugi"	Hamsalekha	S. P. Balasubrahmanyam	
1987	Mr. Raja	"Jhumak Jhumak"	Hamsalekha	S. P. Balasubrahmanyam	
1988	Matru Devobhava	"Priya Priya"	Hamsalekha	solo	
1988	Dharmapatni	"Keetale Kannota Kande"	Hamsalekha	solo	
1988	Dharmapatni	"Amma Amma"	Hamsalekha	Manjula Gururaj, chorus	
1988	Balondu Bhavageethe	"Mavina Marave"	Hamsalekha	B. R. Chaya	
1988	Avale Nanna Hendthi	"Manasidu Hakkiya Goodu"	Hamsalekha	S. P. Balasubrahmanyam	
1988	Anjada Gandu	"Aakaradalli Gulabi"	Hamsalekha	solo	
1989	Yuga Purusha	"Keli Premigale"	Hamsalekha	SPB	
1989	Yuddha Kaanda	"Sa Ri Ga Ma"	Hamsalekha	SPB	
1989	Sura Sundaranga	"O Romanchana"	Hamsalekha	SPB	
1989	Singari Bangari	"Shubha Nudiye Shakunada Hakki"	Hamsalekha	Hamsalekha	
1989	Premagni	"Hey Priya Hey"	Hamsalekha	SPB	
1989	Poli Huduga	"Kuhu Kuhu Kogile"	Hamsalekha	SPB	
1989	C.B.I. Shankar	"Ek Do Theen Chaar"	Hamsalekha	solo	
1989	Avane Nanna Ganda	"Hasiru Gajina Balegale"	Hamsalekha	solo	
1989	Anantana Avantara	"Navarathriyolage"	Hamsalekha	Shivaraj, M. N. Lakshmi Devi	
1989	Anantana Avantara	"Chaligalavu Bantu"	Hamsalekha	SPB	
1989	Anantana Avantara	"Neeniruve Saniha"	Hamsalekha	solo	
1989	Amaanusha	"Idu Vayyarana Vyaparana"	Hamsalekha	solo	
1990	S. P. Sangliyana Part 2	"Tu Tu Tu Tu"	Hamsalekha	Mano	
1990	S. P. Sangliyana Part 2	"Ramayya Ramayya Naa"	Hamsalekha	Manjula Gururaj, B. R. Chaya	
1990	Sididedda Gandu	"Sindhoora"	Hamsalekha	B. K. Sumitra, Kasturi Shankar, B. R. Chaya, Chandrika Gururaj	
1990	Muthina Haara	"Saaru Saaru"	Hamsalekha	SPB	
1990	Bannada Gejje	"Yogaayoga"	Hamsalekha	SPB	
1990	Anantha Prema	"Koravanji Koravanji"	Hamsalekha	Shivaraj, Manohar, Ravi	
1991	Punda Prachanda	"Mandanila Mellane"	Hamsalekha	solo	
1991	Navathaare	"Onde Kshanadalli"	Hamsalekha	SPB	
1991	Kaliyuga Bheema	"Shaari Shaari"	Hamsalekha	solo	
1991	Ajagajanthara	"Love Love Lavva"	Hamsalekha	SPB, chorus	
1991	Ajagajanthara	"Dooradalli Kaano Bettavu"	Hamsalekha	solo	
1992	Prithviraj	"Maavu Sihi Maavu"	Sax Raja	solo	
1992	Gandharva	"Inthone Sikkidare"	Hamsalekha	L. N. Shastry	
1992	Gandharva	"Bandano Gandharvanu"	Hamsalekha	L. N. Shastry	
1992	Entede Bhanta	"Yakindu Neenu"	Hamsalekha	K. J. Yesudas	
1992	Police File	"Minuku Deepa"	Hamsalekha	SPB	
1992	Nanna Thangi	"Nanna Maduve"	Hamsalekha	SPB	
1992	Athimadhura Anuraga	"Nanna Preethiya Roja"	Hamsalekha	SPB	
1992	Alli Ramachari Illi Brahmachari	"Acchu Mecchu Namma"	V. Manohar	L. N. Shastry	
1992	Alli Ramachari Illi Brahmachari	"Jumma Jumma"	V. Manohar	L. N. Shastry, Jaggesh	
1993	Mouna Sangrama	"Huyyo Huyyo Makeraya"	Hamsalekha	solo	
1993	Bevu Bella	"Bhoomi Tabbida Moda"	Hamsalekha	Rajesh Krishnan	
1994	Megha Male	"Bhoodevigindu"	Hamsalekha	SPB	
1994	Kaveri Theeradalli	"Kaveri Theeradalli"	Hamsalekha	solo	
1994	Jaana	"One By Two"	Hamsalekha	SPB	
1994	Jaana	"Dham Dham Endide"	Hamsalekha	SPB	
1994	Gopi Kalyana	"Chandamama"	Hamsalekha	Rajesh Krishnan	
1994	Gopi Kalyana	"Godhuli Veleli"	Hamsalekha	SPB	
1994	Gopi Kalyana	"Enenu Ranna"	Hamsalekha	SPB	
1995	Thayi Illada Tavaru	"Mandara Mandara"	Hamsalekha	Rajesh Krishnan	
1995	Srigandha	"Sister Sister"	Hamsalekha	Vijayalakshmi	
1995	Professor	"Tanuvige Tholinasare"	Hamsalekha	S. P. Balasubrahmanyam	
1995	Mr. Vasu	"Mayada Hennu"	Hamsalekha	solo	
1995	Mojugara Sogasugara	"Hoovamma Hoovamma"	Hamsalekha	Mano	
1995	Eshwar	"Cementina Seemeyali"	Hamsalekha	S. P. Balasubrahmanyam	
1996	Veerabhadra	"Halappa Halappa"	Hamsalekha	Rajesh Krishnan, Sulochana, Chandrika Gururaj	
1996	Circle Inspector	"Puttanarasa Puttanarasa"	Hamsalekha	S. P. Balasubrahmanyam	
1997	Cheluva	"Danthada Gombe"	Hamsalekha	Mano	
1998	Kaurava	"Hello Hello Kauravesha"	Hamsalekha	L. N. Shastry, Murali, Badri Prasad, Ramesh Chandra, Mangala, Suma, Kusuma	
1998	Gadibidi Krishna	"Ene Idu"	Hamsalekha	Rajesh Krishnan	
1999	Vishwa	"Anna Anna"	Hamsalekha	Mano	
1999	Snehaloka	"Dont Worry Tamma"	Hamsalekha	Suresh Peters	
1999	Premachari	"Tarikere Erimele"	Hamsalekha	Rajesh Krishnan, K. S. Chitra	
1999	Nannaseya Hoove	"Hennu Chanda Hennu"	Hamsalekha	Rajesh Krishnan	
1999	Meese Hotta Gandasigen Demandappo Demandu	"Kempi Kempi"	Hamsalekha	Rajesh Krishnan	
1999	Meese Hotta Gandasigen Demandappo Demandu	"Amma Latri"	Hamsalekha	Kashinath, Rajesh Krishnan	
1999	Dalavayi	"Apple Apple"	Hamsalekha	Rajesh Krishnan	
1999	Dalavayi	"Habba Habba"	Hamsalekha	Nanditha, Rajesh Krishnan, Ramesh Chandra	
1999	Coolie Raja	"Manasina Goodalli"	Hamsalekha	Rajesh Krishnan	
1999	Channappa Channegowda	"Mava Mava"	Hamsalekha	Ramesh Chandra, Nanditha	
2000	Yaarige Saalutthe Sambala	"Shravana Veeneya"	Hamsalekha	Rajesh Krishnan	
2000	Naga Devathe	"Naaga Naagi"	Hamsalekha	Hariharan	
2000	Hats Off India	"Naadir Dinna"	Hamsalekha	Rajesh Krishnan	
2000	Hagalu Vesha	"Baaro Baa Baaro"	Hamsalekha	Hamsalekha, Ramesh Chandra	
