= List of Kannada films of 2004 =

The following is a list of films produced in the Kannada film industry in India in 2004, presented in alphabetical order.

Actors Soundarya and Lokesh both passed away during the year. Soundarya's last film, Apthamitra with Vishnuvardhan, was released and became the highest grossing Kannada film at the time with the highest footfalls. Malla marked Ravichandran's comeback while Sudeep's Ranga SSLC and Darshan's Kalasipalya also became successful. Ramesh Aravind had a decent year with Apthamitra and Joke Falls.

In terms of actresses, Ramya for Ranga SSLC and Kanti, Rakshita for Kalasipalya, Neethu for Joke Falls, Priyanka Upendra for Malla, Anu Prabhakar with 5 movies, had an eventful year.

== Released films ==
=== January–June ===
Opening		Title	Director	Cast	Music Director	Genre	Notes
J A N	1st	Veera Kannadiga	Meher Ramesh	Puneeth Rajkumar, Anita Hassanandani, Riyaz Khan, Avinash	Chakri	Action / Romance	The film was simultaneously made in Telugu as Andhrawala
J A N	16th	Kadamba	Suresh Krissna	Vishnuvardhan, Bhanupriya, Ramesh Bhat, Naveen Krishna	Deva	Drama	Remake of Tamil film Thanga Padakam
J A N	23rd	Bisi Bisi	Ramanath Rugvedi	Ramesh Aravind, Madhuri Bhattacharya, Anu Prabhakar, Sihi Kahi Chandru	Milind Dharmasena	Comedy	
J A N	30th	Super Aliya	Rajendra Kumar Arya	Kashinath, Madhuri, Panchami, Sudhir	Pampa	Comedy	
F E B	6th	Abbabba Entha Huduga	Hemanth Hegde	Arjun, Naaz, Seema Shetty, Avinash	Suresh Kumar	Romance	
F E B	6th	Rowdy Aliya	Om Sai Prakash	Shiva Rajkumar, Priyanka Trivedi, Jayamala, Chaya Singh, Doddanna	Rajesh Ramanath; Sadhu Kokila; Koti; K. Kalyan; Vandemataram Srinivas; Babji-Sandeep; Srishailam	Comedy / Romance	
F E B	13th	Om Ganesh	Thriller Manju	Saikumar, Swapna, Ambika, Ashok	M N Krupakar	Action	
F E B	18th	Shwetha Naagara	Sanjeevi	Soundarya, Abbas, Sarath Babu, Dwarakish, Kunigal Nagabhushan	Fantasy Thriller		
F E B	20th	Pandava	Anand P Raj	Vinod Raj, Charanraj, B. Jayashree	Gopi Krishna	Action / Drama	
F E B	27th	Malla	V. Ravichandran	V. Ravichandran, Priyanka Trivedi, Mohan Shankar, Umashree, Tejashree	V. Ravichandran	Romance / Drama	
F E B	27th	Baithare Baithare	Gunakumar	Anand, Sharan, Shyam, Urvashi Patel, Jyothi Krishna, Sangeeta Shetty, Dwarakish	Teja	Comedy	
M A R	5th	Dharma	K V Chandranath	Darshan, Sindhu Menon, Jai Jagadish	Hamsalekha	Action	
M A R	5th	Avale Nanna Gelathi	Om Sai Prakash	Vijay Raghavendra, Rakshita, Devaraj	Koti	Romance	
M A R	5th	Teenagers	B. Shankar	Nivas, Indranag	M N Krupakar	Romance	
M A R	12th	Maha Sambhrama	M Ramamurthy	Murali Krishna, Chaya Singh	Sangeeta Priya	Romance	
M A R	12th	Ok Saar Ok	Dayal Padmanabhan	Madan Patel, Anu Prabhakar	Nag – Mahesh	Romance	
M A R	19th	Saagari	Victory Vasu	Ramkumar, Bhavana, Bhavya, Sadhu Kokila	Sadhu Kokila	Romance / Drama	
M A R	19th	Muni	B. R. Keshava	Dharma, Durga Shetty, Gazar Khan	T. Venkatesh	Action	
M A R	26th	Y2K	N. Lokanath	Nagendra Prasad, Mitisha Sharma, Sadhu Kokila, Mimicry Dayanand	Sadhu Kokila	Drama	
M A R	26th	The City	J. G. Krishna	Sai Kumar, Master Hirannaiah	Sadhu Kokila	Drama	
M A R	26th	Poorvapara	Kudavalli Chandrashekar	Geetha, Srinath, Naveen Mayur, Lakshmi Gopalaswamy	Vijaya Bhaskar	Drama	Based on a novel by M. K. Indira.
A P R	2nd	Aagodella Olledakke	A. R. Babu	Jaggesh, Abitha, Tara	Raj Bhaskar	Comedy	
A P R	9th	Darshan	Ramesh Kitty	Darshan, Navaneeth, Srujan Lokesh, Chitra Shenoy	Sadhu Kokila	Action	
A P R	9th	Monda	Teshi Venkatesh	Sai Kumar, Prashanti, Pavithra Lokesh	Stephen Prayog	Action	
A P R	16th	Preethi Nee Illade Naa Hegirali	Eshwar Balegundi	C. P. Yogeshwar, Anu Prabhakar	Chaitanya	Romance	
A P R	16th	Friendship	B. R. Keshav	Dharma, Shamitha	Mahesh	Drama	
A P R	23rd	Ranga SSLC	Yogaraj Bhat	Sudeep, Ramya, Rangayana Raghu	Sandeep Chowta	Comedy/ Romance / Drama	
A P R	23rd	Bhagath	Anand P. Raju	Thriller Manju, Swapna	M N Krupakar	Action	
A P R	23rd	Kanasina Loka	G. S. Sarasa Kumar	Vasu, Gopika	Teja	Romance	
A P R	30th	Durgi	P. Ravi Shankar	Malashri, Ashish Vidyarthi, Avinash, Raghuvaran, Kalabhavan Mani	Hamsalekha	Action	
M A Y	7th	Monalisa	Indrajit Lankesh	Dhyan, Sadha, Bhavya, Ramakrishna, Darshan	Valisha – Sandeep	Romance	
M A Y	7th	Hendthi Andre Hendthi	Anand P. Raju	Shashikumar, Shruti	V. Manohar	Family	
M A Y	7th	Nija	K. V. Raju	Jaggesh, Lahari	Raj Bharath	Drama	
M A Y	14th	Bimba	Kavita Lankesh	Daisy Bopanna, Raksha, Sampath Kumar	Isaac Thomas Kottukapally	Drama	
M A Y	21st	Srirampura Police Station	J G Krishna	Sai Kumar, Durga Shetty	London Chandru	Action	
M A Y	28th	Rama Krishna	Om Sai Prakash	V. Ravichandran, Jaggesh, Laila Mehdin, Kaveri	S. A. Rajkumar	Romance	
M A Y	28th	Mellusire Savigana	Ramesh Krishna	Harish, Rashmi Kulkarni	V. Manohar	Romance	
M A Y	28th	Samudra	Kushal Babu	Kushal Babu, Thriller Manju	M. N. Krupakar	Action	
J U N	4th	Pathi Patni Avalu	Vijay Gujjar	Adarsh, Amritha	Shyam Sunder	Comedy	
J U N	18th	Baa Baaro Rasika	Dayal Padmanabhan	Sunil Raoh, Ramya Krishnan, Ashitha	Mahesh	Romance	
J U N	18th	Sakhi	S. Mahendar	Praveen Kumar, Poonam	Chaitanya	Romance	
J U N	25th	Kanasu	Sushil Mokashi	Sushil Mokashi, Sanjjanaa	Sameer Kulkarni	Drama	
J U N	25th	Devasura	A. N. Jayaramaiah	Devaraj, B. C. Patil	Guna Singh	Action	

=== July – December ===
Opening		Title	Director	Cast	Music Director	Genre	Notes
J U L	2nd	Kanakambari	Dinesh Babu	Anu Prabhakar, Vijayalakshmi, Om Prakash Rao, Bank Janardhan	Praveen D. Rao	Horror	
J U L	2nd	Crime Story	B. R. Keshav	Devaraj, Monisha Sagar, Shobhraj	Maruthi Meerajkar	Action	
J U L	9th	Love	Rajendra Singh Babu	Auditya, Rakshita, Mohanlal, Amrish Puri	Anu Malik	Romance / Action	
J U L	9th	Kanti	Bharath	Sri Murali, Ramya, Mumtaj	Gurukiran	Action	
J U L	16th	Gowdru	S. Mahendar	Ambareesh, Shruti, Devaraj, Meena	Hamsalekha	Drama	
J U L	23rd	Target	H. S. Rajashekar	Thriller Manju, Ruchita Prasad	M. N. Krupakar	Action	
J U L	30th	Sarvabhouma	Mahesh Sukhadhare	Shiva Rajkumar, Shilpa Anand	Hamsalekha	Action	
A U G	6th	Bhagawan	H. Vasu	Darshan, Daisy Bopanna, Bhavana	Rajesh Ramanath	Action / Romance	
A U G	13th	Ajju	N. T. Jayarama Reddy	Sri Harsha, Ranjitha	Rajesh Ramanath	Action	
A U G	13th	Naari Munidare Gandu Parari	G. K. M. Raju	Kashinath, Varsha, Tara, Doddanna	Rajesh Ramanath	Comedy	
A U G	20th	Pakkadmane Hudugi	M. S. Rajashekar	Raghavendra Rajkumar, Ranjitha, Ananth Nag, Mohan Shankar	Rajesh Ramanath	Comedy	Remake of Hindi film Padosan
A U G	20th	Bidalaare	Ramana	Anil Kalyan, Keerthi Chawla	K. M. Indra	Romance	
A U G	20th	Real Rowdy	Bhavani Shankar	Charanraj, Yashaswini	Layendra; Madan	Action	
A U G	27th	Apthamitra	P. Vasu	Vishnuvardhan, Ramesh Aravind, Soundarya, Prema, Dwarakish, Vinaya Prasad, Avinash	Gurukiran	Horror / Thriller / Drama	Remake of Malayalam film Manichitrathazhu
A U G	27th	Shuklambharadaram	Mastaan	Mohan Shankar, Durga Shetty	S P Chandrakanth	Comedy	
S E P	10th	Yahoo	Seetaram Karanth	Saurav, Neethu, H. G. Dattatreya	M. N. Krupakar	Horror	
S E P	10th	Praana	Prakash	Prem Kumar, Preethi	Allwyn Fernandes	Romance	
S E P	18th	Omkara	Shivamani	Upendra, Preeti Jhangiani, Shweta Menon, Rangayana Raghu	Gurukiran	Drama / Action	
S E P	24th	Sahukara	Om Prakash Rao	V. Ravichandran, Vishnuvardhan, Shashikumar, Rambha, Rangayana Raghu, Sumithra	Rajesh Ramanath	Romance / Drama	Remake of Tamil film Muthu
S E P	24th	Thali Kattuva Shuba Vele	N. R. Vishwanath	Kumar Bangarappa, Sudharani, Anu Prabhakar, Rajesh	Rajan Gurung	Drama	
O C T	15th	Kalasipalya	Om Prakash Rao	Darshan, Rakshita, Avinash, Sadhu Kokila	Sadhu Kokila	Action	
O C T	15th	Aaha Nanna Thangi Maduve	Kashinath	Kashinath, Lakshmi Musuri, Varna, Bank Janardhan	V. Manohar	Comedy	
O C T	22nd	Maurya	S. Narayan	Puneeth Rajkumar, Meera Jasmine, Roja, Devaraj	Gurukiran	Romance	Remake of Telugu film Amma Nanna O Tamila Ammayi
O C T	29th	Srusti	Basavaraj	Nagendra Prasad, Vinod Prabhakar, Priyadarshini, Roopa Hassan	S. A. Rajkumar	Drama	
N O V	12th	Nalla	V. Nagendra Prasad	Sudeep, Sangeetha, Tara, Srinath	Venkat Narayan	Romance / Drama	
N O V	12th	Santhosha	A. M. R. Ramesh	Siddharth, Rajesh Krishnan, Anita, Pranathi	Stephen Prayog	Romance	
N O V	12th	Jennifer	Y. S. Balaraj	Y. S. Balaraj, Neetha	A T Raveesh	Romance	
N O V	12th	Dharma Yodharu	Sudhakar A Bannanje	Samarth, Roopa Ravindran	V. Manohar	Documentary	
N O V	19th	Trin Trin	T. Chikkanna	Dharma, Ruthika	Rajesh Ramanath	Suspense Thriller	
N O V	26th	Aliya Mane Tholiya	Nagendra Magadi	Om Prakash Rao, Ruchita Prasad	Rajesh Ramanath	Comedy	
D E C	3rd	Joke Falls	Ashok Patil	Ramesh Aravind, Neethu, Deepali, Dattanna	Mano Murthy	Comedy	
D E C	3rd	Saradara	P. N. Sathya	Darshan, Gurleen Chopra, Srinivasa Murthy	Venkat Narayan	Action	
D E C	3rd	Priya Manase	Madhu Mohana	Uday, Lathashree	Shivasatya	Romance	
D E C	17th	Jyeshta	Suresh Krissna	Vishnuvardhan, Ashima Bhalla, Ramesh Bhat, Aniruddha Jatkar, Devaraj, Sindhu Menon	S. A. Rajkumar	Action	Remake of Malayalam film Valliettan
D E C	24th	Kanchana Ganga	Rajendra Singh Babu	Shiva Rajkumar, Sridevi Vijayakumar, Parvin Dabbas, Sumalatha, Sadhu Kokila, Arjun	S. A. Rajkumar	Drama	
D E C	31st	Chappale	Naganna	Sunil Raoh, Richa Pallod, Sihi Kahi Chandru	R. P. Patnaik	Romance	
