= Ajagajantara =

1991 Indian Kannada-language film

- DVD cover
- Directed by: Kashinath
- Written by: Upendra (dialogues)
- Screenplay by: Kashinath; Upendra
- Story by: Gayathri Cine Creations
- Produced by: Kashinath; Doddayya; Sathyanarayana; Datthathreya; Umapathy
- Starring: Kashinath; Anjana; Sriraksha; Sudheendra; Bank Janardhan
- Cinematography: Umapathy
- Edited by: Subrahmanyam
- Music by: Hamsalekha
- Production company: Sri Gayathri Arts
- Release date: 24 January 1991
- Running time: 157 minutes
- Country: India
- Language: Kannada

Ajagajantara (transl. The difference between a goat and an elephant) is a 1991 Indian Kannada-language romantic black comedy film directed by Kashinath who himself stars in the film alongside Anjana and Sriraksha. Actor director Upendra did an extended cameo. The core plot was loosely based on the 1988 novel Indecent Proposal.

== Plot ==
The story revolves around a wife who puts up her husband for sale and the trouble that follows.

== Cast ==
- Kashinath
- Anjana
- Sriraksha
- Sudheendra
- Sathyabhama
- Somasekhar Rao
- Bank Janardhan
- Prakash
- Ramachandra
- Anjanappa
- Gotoori
- Chaya
- Kavitha
- Padmashree
- Ramaprabha
- Shanmugam
- Suresh Devanagare
- Sorat Subrahmanyam
- Vijanath Biradar
- Uma
- Rathnashree
- Sundaramma
- Prathibha
- Ramesh
- Dheerendra Kulakarni
- Venkatesh
- Kumar
- Autoraja
- Padmini
- Sudarshini
- Prabhamma
- Upendra as the owner of Dum Dum Agarbattis (extended cameo appearance)

== Production ==
The film was scripted by Gayathri Cine Creations, which earlier worked on Anantana Avantara's script. It was directed, co-produced, and acted by Kashinath. Hamsalekha composed the songs, while music director, V. Manohar, and actor, Upendra (in his struggling days), wrote the lyrics. Upendra himself had penned the dialogue and wrote the screenplay along with Kashinath. He also made a cameo appearance.

== Soundtrack ==
Ajagajantara

Soundtrack album by Hamsalekha
- Released: 1991
- Genre: Feature film soundtrack
- Length: 24:30
- Language: Kannada
- Label: Lahari Music

Hamsalekha chronology
Bhujangayyana Dashavathara (1991)	Ajagajantara (1991)	Neenu Nakkare Haalu Sakkare (1991)
External audio
- Ajagajantara – Jukebox on YouTube

The songs were composed by Hamsalekha. The lyrics were penned by V. Manohar and Upendra.

No.	Title	Singer(s)	Length
1.	"Nooru Gandu Banderu"	Manjula Gururaj, Chorus	3:57
2.	"Love Love Lavva"	S. P. Balasubrahmanyam, Latha Hamsalekha, Chorus	6:09
3.	"Thattona Thattona"	S. P. Balasubrahmanyam, Chandrika Gururaj	4:30
4.	"Dooradalli Kano Bettavu"	S. P. Balasubrahmanyam, Chandrika Gururaj	5:07
5.	"Jeevanada"	Vishnu, Manjula Gururaj	4:47
Total length:			24:30

== Release ==
The movie was released on 24 January 1991. Upon release the movie received positive response from the people and went on to run for more than 180 days in movie halls. The movie was declared a blockbuster at the box office. It is considered to be one of the best movies in the career of Kashinath. The humorous sequences in the movie were well appreciated by the people. The movie since then has a massive cult following in Karnataka. Anjana, who played the wife's role, catapulted to fame after the successful run of this movie.
