= Tharle Nan Maga =

1992 film by Upendra

- DVD cover
- Directed by: Upendra
- Screenplay by: Upendra
- Story by: Upendra
- Produced by: M. B. Babu; C. S. Manjunath; P. G. Padma Ramaswamy
- Starring: Jaggesh; Nithya; Anjali Sudhakar
- Cinematography: Murthy
- Edited by: R. Janardhan
- Music by: V. Manohar
- Production company: Panchami Chithra
- Release date: 1992
- Running time: 135 minutes
- Country: India
- Language: Kannada

Tharle Nan Maga (transl. Naughty fellow) is a 1992 Indian Kannada-language comedy drama film written and directed by Upendra in his directorial debut, which stars Jaggesh and Anjali Sudhakar in lead roles, who also made their debuts in lead roles with the film. The film was reportedly based loosely on Jean-Paul Sartre's short story Erostasus. Upendra also made a cameo appearance in the film. The film was a box office success and became a cult classic.

The story revolves around a miserly couple Parandamaiah Urbagal (Bank Janardhan) and Subbalakshmi (Satyabhama), who want their son Santhosh Urbagal (Jaggesh) to marry a rich girl, for want of dowry. Santhosh, however, marries a girl from a poor financial background, antagonizing them. How son changes his parents outlook forms rest of the story.

== Plot ==
Parandamaiah owns a general store, 'Oorubaglu General Stores'. Santhosh likes to keep the shop as he loves Sangeetha, the daughter of Shankar Shastry, a musician, whose house is opposite to the shop. Santhosh spends his time sightseeing (the subject is mostly Sangeetha) and he is hostile towards customers when he is sightseeing (he calls it 'Dove Hodiyodu', one of his popular dialogues). His friends - 'Chitke' Seena, Raja, 'Razor' Manja, Nanja and 'nanjappan maga' Gunjappa help Santhosh gain Sangeetha's affection. However, Parandamaiah and Satyabhama decide to marry off Santhosh to his uncle's daughter Sundari for dowry. Santhosh disagrees to marry any girl for dowry as he wants his wife to be the love of his life. Santhosh succeeds in marrying Sangeetha by hoodwinking his parents. Later, with the help of his friends, he starts to enjoy his married life. But, Parandamaiah and Satyabhama decide to cheat Santhosh and create a feud between Santhosh and Sangeetha. They make Sangeetha assume that Santhosh is having a sexual relationship with Sundari. Meanwhile, they make Santhosh assume Sangeetha is having an extramarital affair. Santhosh investigates this and he assumes that Sangeetha is having an affair (the assumed boyfriend was paid by Parandamaiah). Due to this, Sangeetha goes back to her maternal home. Soon Santhosh finds out the truth, and, with the help of his friends, makes his parents realize that good values are more important than money. Later, after he makes his parents realise their mistake, his uncle finds that Sundari is pregnant. He allegedly accuses Santhosh of impregnating Sundari. However, this is not the case as he had told his friends to loaf and flirt with Sundari to enlighten his parents. Later, Santhosh arranges for the marriage of Sundari. In the climax, Santhosh finds that Gunjappa had impregnated Sundari and he is forced to marry Sundari.

== Cast ==
- Jaggesh as Santosh Urbagal
- Nithya as Sangeetha, Santosh's wife
- Bank Janardhan as Parandamaiah Urbagal, Santosh's father
- Satyabhama as Subbalakshmi, Santosh's mother
- Anjali Sudhakar as Sundri
- Mysore Lokesh as Santosh's Maternal Uncle and Sundri's father
- Tennis Krishna as Gunjappa
- M. S. Umesh as Purohit
- Vijanath Biradar as beggar
- Honnavalli Krishna as Chitke Seena
- L. S. Sudhindra as Sangeetha's father
- Sriraj Kothari
- Madhugiri Prakash

== Production ==
Upendra, former assistant of Kashinath made his directorial debut with this film. The film also introduced Jaggesh as a lead actor and V. Manohar as a composer both went on to become popular.

== Soundtrack ==
All the songs are composed, scored by V. Manohar and lyrics written by Upendra.

- "Sangeetha Kalisikodi" - L. N. Shastry, Chandrika Gururaj, Upendra, V. Manohar
- "Ninna Ninna Jadsi Odithini" - Jaggesh, Manjula Gururaj
- "Hingyaake Nee Kaduthi" - Chandrika Gururaj
- "Dagar Dagar" - L. N. Shastry, Latha Hamsalekha, Upendra
