= Chapala Chennigaraya =

- Directed by: H. R. Bhargava
- Written by: Kunigal Nagabhushan
- Screenplay by: H. R. Bhargava
- Story by: K. Bhagyaraj
- Based on: Chinna Veedu (Tamil) by K. Bhagyaraj
- Produced by: M. Rajagopal; Suresh Kumar
- Starring: Kashinath; Kalpana; Vanitha Vasu; Sundar Krishna Urs
- Cinematography: B. S. Basavaraj
- Edited by: Victor-Yadav
- Music by: Rajan–Nagendra
- Production company: Radhakrishna Productions
- Distributed by: Radhakrishna Productions
- Release date: 18 January 1990
- Running time: 131 minutes
- Country: India
- Language: Kannada

Chapala Chennigaraya is a 1990 Indian Kannada-language comedy drama film, directed by H. R. Bhargava, and produced by M. Rajagopal and Suresh Kumar. The film stars Kashinath, Kalpana, Vanitha Vasu and Sundar Krishna Urs. Rajan–Nagendra composed the music. The film is a remake of Tamil film Chinna Veedu (1985).

== Cast ==
- Kashinath as Madan Gopal
- Kalpana as Rukku
- Vanitha Vasu as Sangeetha
- Sundar Krishna Urs as Madan Gopal's father
- Shimoga Venkatesh
- Suresh Kumar
- M. S. Karanth as police inspector
- Shani Mahadevappa as Bora
- Bangalore Nagesh
- Shankanada Aravind
- Kunigal Nagabhushan
- Dingri Nagaraj as peon in bank
- BEML Somanna
- Srishailan
- Bank Janardhan as ironer
- Jeevan Prakash (credited as Master Jeevan Prakash)
- Abhijith as Ramesh
- Rathnakar
- Janaki
- M. N. Lakshmi Devi as Padmabai
- Gayathri Prabhakar as Gayatri
- Sujatha
- Anu Prabhakar (uncredited)
