= Shhh! (film) =

- DVD Cover
- Directed by: Upendra
- Written by: Upendra
- Produced by: Kumar Govind
- Starring: Kumar Govind; Kashinath
- Cinematography: Ashok Kashyap
- Edited by: R. Janardhan
- Music by: Sadhu Kokila
- Production company: SK Films
- Release date: 3 December 1993
- Running time: 130 minutes
- Country: India
- Language: Kannada

Shhh! is a 1993 Indian Kannada-language horror thriller film written and directed by Upendra. It stars Kumar Govind, Kashinath and Suresh Heblikar, with N.B. Jayaprakash, Shankar Bhatt, Bank Janardhan, Goturi, Mimicri Dayanand, Baby Rashmi, Megha and others in support roles. The film also stars Kashinath and introduced Kumar Govind as mainstream hero. It has a cameo by Upendra as a wannabe actor in police costume. This film went on to be a major commercial success. It created a new trend of thriller movies in Kannada cinema. It was also the debut movie of Sadhu Kokila as an actor and music director.

== Plot ==
A young boy comes out of his house at midnight to relieve himself, where he hears some leaves rustling in the distance, and looks up to see what it is. His face suddenly bears an expression of horror, and he screams at the top of his lungs. A few days later, a shooting crew led by veteran Kannada director Kashinath and producer {N.B. Jayaprakash} are on their way to start filming their newly approved film. For shooting, they have selected Onti Mane Estate (Lone House Estate), a lonely estate feared in the vicinity. As they try to find their way, they encounter a series of mishaps, which irritates Kashinath. They arrive at the estate, where they meet the estate owner Nagraj Rao. Nagraj Rao's daughter Bharathi keeps playing hilarious pranks on Kashinath and the film's protagonist Kumar. Kumar is instantly attracted to Bharathi due to her outgoing and charming personality and falls in love with her.

As the shooting progresses, strange events start taking place, where the demon ghost's costume starts smoking in the middle of the night and Kumar witnesses a hooded figure leaving Nagraj Rao's house. When he tries to follow the figure, Rao's brother-in-law stops him and warns him not to roam around the estate at night. A few hours later, a demonic figure (wearing the film's ghost costume) nabs him from behind and carrys him to the top of estate hill which is a dilapidated house. Frightened by his disappearance, Nagaraj Rao's wife lodges a complaint, where SI Kalappa and his perennially drowsy constable take charge of the investigation. A few days later, it is revealed that Nagaraj's wife was the hooded figure and her brother was looking out for her as she had an affair with a local sanyasi Dayananda Swamiji. The same night, as she goes out to meet her lover, she is trailed by the demon. The sanyasi and Nagraj Rao's wife make love. As the sanyasi steps out to fetch water, the demon knocks him out and kidnaps Nagaraj Rao's wife, where he whisks her to the same dilapidated house.

On seeing his family members disappearing one by one, Nagaraj Rao is distraught. Surprisingly, his son Krishna and Bharati least bothered with all these. Later, a top cop accuses Kashinath to be responsible for all murders. It is later revealed that he was just an aspiring actor trying to impress Kashinath with his acting skills. Meanwhile, the police superintendent takes SI Kalappa to task and issues orders to intensify investigations. Tragedy strikes the film crew, when the assistant director is found brutally murdered and the demon's play intensifies with many supernatural occurrences, making the people believe that a ghost is indeed haunted the estate. As Kumar and Kashinath try to demystify the deaths, they find holes and trenches dug in sporadic parts of the estate, leaving them confounded.

As the days pass, tragedy strikes Nagaraj Rao's family again when Krishna is brutally murdered. Kashinath finds a vital artifact, a golden token of Lord Hanuman, which he believes holds to solve this murder mystery. However, Kashinath is thrown into a tizzy when he sees the same artifact with Kumar, and the specter of doubt soon looms large on Kumar's involvement with the murders. One night, Kumar escorts Bharathi into the forest in the middle of the night and abandons her. Just as he leaves, the demon attacks her. Hearing her cries for help, Kumar jumps in and fights the demon. After a grueling fight, the demon escapes upon seeing Kashinath and his crew. Soon, Kashinath ask about the copy of the artifact. Kumar tells him that it was handed to him by Bharathi, who had in turn, received it from her father. Kashinath realizes that Nagaraj Rao is the one behind all this, and they rush to his house, only to find him hanging from the ceiling with a suicide note. The family's maid reveals that Nagaraj Rao's greedy wife and his brother-in-law manipulated him to murder his friend Ramappa to steal a pot filled with golden artifacts, which they discovered, but they could not find the treasure. After hearing the story, Kumar and Kashinath decides to find out. Kumar sees a burnt man holding a corpse and the doctor from the neighboring estate reprimanding him by showing him fire. Kumar interferes and grabs the doctor hostage under a knife, who then reveals that the burnt man is the son of Ramappa, who survived the fire but he suffered psychological trauma because of the injuries. The doctor tried his best to help him, but he would just dig up female corpses, thinking that it was his long-lost wife. The doctor tells Kumar that Ramappa had another son seeking revenge and is a member of the film crew. As Kumar asks him who the person was, he is knocked out by the demon. Producer {N.B. Jayaprakash} keeps on digging the ground suspiciously as though searching funds, misleads audience as he is the main suspect reason for murders happened.

Now that the vengeful goal of eliminating Mr. Rao's family is complete, the demon and his brother commit suicide by drinking cyanide in front of the doctor. Kumar wakes up and reaches the burnt-down house to find them dead. The doctor reveals that the demon is the production manager Srikanta, who had earlier faked his death and his brother, who was an accomplice in his crimes of brutally murdering Rao's family. Kashinath, Bharati, and others rush to see it and Bharthi is relieved. But to everyone's surprise, Srikantha tries to strangle Bharthi. Before he can do anything serious, the Superintendent kills him. The film ends with Kashinath wishing Kumar and Bharthi a happy and peaceful married life as they leave the estate after wrapping their shooting.

== Cast ==
- Kumar Govind as Kumar
- Kashinath as Kashinath
- Suresh Heblikar as Superintendent of Police
- Megha as Bharathi
- K. Praveen Nayak as Krishna, Bharathi's brother
- Goturi as Nagaraja Rao
- Bank Janardhan as Inspector Kalappa
- Vaijanath Biradar as the drowsy constable
- Mimicry Dayanand as Dayananda Theertha Swamiji
- Shankar Bhat as production manager Srikantu
- Dr. Venkat Janardhan as Dr. Kurien
- Suma as Devi, Nagaraj Rao's wife
- S. Murali Mohan as assistant director Murali
- Michael Madhu as cameraman Micheal
- Kantha Purushottam as Sundaramma, house servant of Nagaraj Rao
- Susheel Raj as assistant director Susheel
- Latha as Cotton Kamalakshi, film heroine
- Balu Murugaraj as Balu, technician of the film crew
- Upendra as dummy inspector (Special appearance)
- Sadhu Kokila as Kung Fu Kannan (Special appearance)
- Thriller Manju as Kungfu Master (Special appearance)

== Production ==
Upendra and his friends started working on a story during college holidays called Nigooda Neralugalu which eventually took different forms and finally took the shape of this movie story.

== Soundtrack ==
- "Avanalli Ivalilli" - L. N. Shastry, Chandrika Gururaj
- "Dava Dava Nadukava" - S. P. Balasubrahmanyam, Manjula Gururaj
- " One Day Sunday Ninna Kandenu" - S. P. Balasubrahmanyam, Manjula Gururaj
- " Ee Bhayadalleno Thrill Ide" - L. N. Shastry, Upendra, Shivaji Rao

== Release ==
=== Critical reception ===
A critic from Film Companion wrote in 2020 that "With elements hinting at the supernatural, the final reveal was a big surprise, aided by the plot that holds on to its suspense with great skill".

=== Box office ===
This film went on to be a major commercial success. It created a new trend of suspense thriller movies in Kannada cinema. It established Upendra as a well-known director. It completed 100 days in 26 centres. The film was later dubbed in Telugu.

=== Re-release ===
The film was re-released in 2015 with enhanced digital effects.

== Title ownership ==
Many films have tried to use Shhh! in their title, but none have been successful. Kumar Govind held the rights for the title Shhh 2 in case Upendra decided to make a sequel. Hemanth Hegde wanted to use the title for his thriller film, which he renamed Mathume Shhh. Another filmmaker Shekhar Gowda claimed that he received the rights to the title Shhh after receiving a no object certificate from producer Jagan.

== Awards ==
Karnataka State Film Awards 1993-94

- Third Best Film
- Best Editor - R. Janardhan
