= Anjali Sudhakar =

Indian actress

Anjali
- Born: Shantha
- Occupation: Actress
- Children: 2

Anjali is an Indian actress who appeared in Kannada cinema. Her original name was Shantha, before director Kashinath named her as Anjali.

== Family ==
Anjali is married to Sudhakar and since 1998 has settled in Bengaluru. She has two daughters.

== Career ==
Anjali has acted in more than 97 films. Some of her notable films are Anantana Avantara, Neenu Nakkare Haalu Sakkare, Tharle Nan Maga, Appa Nanjappa Maga Gunajappa, Ksheera Saagara, Kalavida, Kona Eedaithe, Undu Hodha Kondu Hodha and Utkarsha. She has acted opposite Vishnuvardhan, Ambareesh, Anant Nag, Jaggesh, Kumar Govind, Kumar Bangarappa, Sridhar, Sunil, Jai Jagadish and Ravikiran. She has also acted in the television series Netharavathi after a twenty year hiatus.

== Partial filmography ==
Year	Show	Role	Notes
1988	Kankana Bhagya		
1988	Chiranjeevi Sudhakar		
1989	Maha Yuddha		
1989	Idu Saadhya	Nurse	
1989	Hendthighelbedi	Thimma's wife	
1989	Avane Nanna Ganda		
1989	Anantana Avantara	Menaka	
1990	Ganeshana Maduve	Abhilasha	
1990	Utkarsha		
1990	College Hero		
1991	Nagu Naguta Nali		
1991	Antharangada Mrudanga		
1991	Undoo Hoda Kondoo Hoda		
1991	Shwethaagni		
1991	Rollcall Ramakrishna		
1991	Neenu Nakkare Haalu Sakkare	Sheela	
1992	Bhale Keshava		
1992	Tharle Nan Maga	Sundri	
1992	Bombat Hendthi		
1992	Saptapadi	Vijaya	
1992	Pranayada Pakshigalu		
1992	Undu Hoda Kondu Hoda	Rum Rum	
1993	Jana Mecchida Maga		
1993	Bhavya Bharatha		
1994	Sididedda Shiva		
1994	Murder		
1994	Gopi Kalyana		
1994	Appa Nanjappa Maga Gunjappa		
1995	Thumbida Mane		
1995	Kona Edaithe		
1997	Kalavida		
1997	Baduku Jataka Bandi		
