= Hats Off India =

Indian film

- VCD cover
- Directed by: R Raghunath
- Written by: R Raghunath
- Produced by: G. Nandakumar
- Starring: Ganesh; Ashitha
- Cinematography: Sundarnath Suvarna
- Edited by: T Shashikumar
- Music by: Hamsalekha
- Production company: Vishwapriya Films
- Release date: 29 January 2000
- Country: India
- Language: Kannada

Hats Off India is a 2000 Indian Kannada-language film directed by R Raghunath and starring Ganesh and Ashitha with B. C. Patil and Sadhu Shetty in supporting roles. This was the last film of legendary actress Pandari Bai.

== Plot ==
As Bharathanatyam dancers, Ravi and Jyothi go to America to spread Indian culture. Upon returning from a performance, Ravi and Jyothi are dragged on the roads in an Indian locality and an American senator's son tries to rape Jyothi in pitch darkness. An angered Ravi uses the senator's son's pistol and shoots him. He runs away with Jyothi to India.

Unfazed by their escape, the senator contacts the dons Sadhu Shetty and Dawood in India to get Ravi dead or alive. Sadhu Shetty succeeds in his effort but Ravi and Jyothi change his mind and he lets them go. Taking advantage of this Dawood follows the pair but he gets killed at a port, and Jyothi loses her two legs in the encounter. B. C. Patil, a cop, tries to save Ravi and Jyothi. On the advice of US court he takes Ravi to US. From a clue the judge knows about the real happenings that lead to senator's son's murder. B. C. Patil changes the Indian mentality to help out Ravi, who is an alleged criminal. The unity among the Indians causes the judge to pass a judgement in favour of Ravi. In the court battle the judge, the senator and other US citizens salute by saying Hats off India.

== Cast ==
- B. C. Patil
- Sadhu Shetty as himself
- Ganesh as Ravi S.
- Ashitha as Jyothi
- Janagaraj
- Shivaram
- Bank Janardhan as Raghavendra Tea Stall owner
- Pandari Bai as Smt. Pandaribai, organizer
- Kishori Ballal

== Production ==
Ramnath, who worked as an assistant director to Upendra in A (1998), makes his directorial debut through film. The film is jointly produced by G. Nandakumar, the producer of America! America!! (1997) who won the Kannada Rajyotsava Award in 1998, with B Jagannath under the banner of Vishwapriya Films. The film got embroiled in controversy due to having an English title. Part of the film was shot in Mangalore in December 1998. G. Nandakumar reused some shots from America! America!! (1997), much to the dissent of Nagathihalli Chandrashekhar. The court scenes were shot at Nandakumar's home which was converted into an American courtroom.

== Soundtrack ==
Hats Off India

Soundtrack album by Hamsalekha
- Released: 2000
- Genre: Feature film soundtrack
- Length: 25:58
- Language: Kannada
- Label: Akash Audio

Hamsalekha chronology
Preethse (2000)	Hats Off India (2000)	Shabdavedhi (2000)
External audio
- Hats Off India – Jukebox on YouTube

The music is composed by Hamsalekha. The titular song was originally 12 minutes long.

All lyrics are written by Hamsalekha.

Track listing
No.	Title	Singer(s)	Length
1.	"Hats Off India"	Ramesh Chandra	5:25
2.	"Kannada Chithrava Nodranna"	Rajesh Krishnan	5:05
3.	"Naadir Dinna"	Rajesh Krishnan, Latha Hamsalekha	5:19
4.	"Odu Odu Odu"	G. V. Atri	5:04
5.	"You Read Love"	Rajesh Krishnan	5:05
Total length:			25:58

== Reception ==
A critic from indiainfo.com wrote that "On the whole Hats off to late director Raghunath for his dexterity and producer Nandakumar for his taste and Dil (transl. guts) to make bold films".
