= Super Aliya =

- poster
- Directed by: Rajendrakumar Arya
- Written by: Kunigal Nagabhushan (dialogue)
- Screenplay by: B. Ramamurthy
- Story by: B. Ramamurthy
- Produced by: B. Sathyanarayana
- Starring: Kashinath; Madhuri; Panchami
- Cinematography: K J Vasudev
- Edited by: S. Soundar Rajan
- Music by: Pampa
- Production company: Panchamuki Hanuman Productions
- Release date: 30 January 2004
- Country: India
- Language: Kannada

Super Aliya (transl. Superb son-in-law) is a 2004 Indian Kannada-language comedy drama film directed by Rajendrakumar Arya and starring Kashinath, Madhuri and Panchami. The film was released on 30 January 2004.

== Cast ==
- Kashinath as Ganesh / Vijay (dual role)
- Madhuri
- Panchami
- Vijayalakshmi as Lakshmi
- Sathyabhama as Lakshmi's mother-in-law
- Sudhir as Manappa
- Bank Janardhan
- Kunigal Nagabhushan as Seenappa

== Production ==
The film was shot with no publicity. This film was one amongst several other films eligible for government subsidies.

== Soundtrack ==
The music was composed by Pampa.

Track listing
No.	Title	Singer(s)	Length
1.	"Zandu Balminida"	Mangala Narayan, Ravi Shanker	5:11
2.	"Yake Late Priya"	Pampa, Manjula Gururaj	3:43
3.	"Neene Nan Ganda Kano"	Archana Udapa, Mysore Krishna Murthy	4:37
4.	"Guest Houseidu"	Mangala Narayan	6:10
Total length:			19:41

== Reception ==
A critic from Deccan Herald wrote that "Kashinath’s acting is as usual but Director Rajendrakumar Arya has not fully utilised his talents. Madhuri and Panchami, who have made names in teleserials like Gauthami and Kaveri, fail to impress. Costumes are weird and songs are routine. Dialogues by Kunigal Nagabhushan are not as expected. The director seems to have lost his grip over the story and the movie goes haywire". A critic from indiainfo.com wrote that "One cannot make a comedy film with Kashinath in it. A film won't run if there are four girls with minimum clothes. These are somethings which the director has to understand".

== Home media ==
The film was telecast on Udaya TV on 8 August 2019 at 10:00 p.m.
