= Avale Nanna Hendthi =

- Lobby card
- Directed by: S. Umesh; K. Prabhakar
- Produced by: K. Prabhakar
- Starring: Kashinath; Bhavya
- Cinematography: Mallikarjuna
- Edited by: S. Umesh
- Music by: Hamsalekha
- Production company: Vijaya Films
- Release date: 1988
- Running time: 136 minutes
- Country: India
- Language: Kannada

Avale Nanna Hendthi ( transl. She is my wife) is a 1988 Indian Kannada-language comedy drama film directed by S. Umesh and K. Prabhakar, and produced by Vijay Films. It stars Kashinath and Bhavya. Dealing with the prevalent social issue of dowry system, the plot revolves around a man's struggle in getting his sister's marriage arranged to fulfill his mother's and sisters-in-law's desire for a dowry, despite being in love himself and wanting to marry first. It features Mukhyamantri Chandru, N. S. Rao, Gora Bheema Rao, Thyagaraja Urs and Tara in supporting roles.

The film was remade in Telugu as Pelli Chesi Choodu (1988), in Tamil as Jadikketha Moodi (1988) and in Hindi as Jawani Zindabad (1990). Hamsalekha was the music director for both Tamil and Telugu versions.

== Plot ==
Vishwanath (Kashinath), pledges never to give nor receive dowry in protest against the dowry system. And he acts against his mother's wishes; Mohan marries Uma (Bhavya) without asking for any dowry. He arranges his sister, Gayathri's (Tara) marriage with Ravi (Raviraj), the son of Somashekharayya. Somashekharayya is a Municipal Counselor and is a very greedy man. As he does not get any dowry, he and his wife become quite upset, though Ravi is happy. Both want Ravi to remarry so that they can get dowry. Meanwhile, Gayathri becomes pregnant and so the in-laws try to eliminate her at the earliest. Somashekharayya gets Ravi transferred to another city. After sending him away, Somashekharayya plans to kill Gayathri in a fashion similar to an accident. But things did not turn up as he expected and his wife gets badly burned, who has to be hospitalized. Taking this opportunity, Somashekharayya blames Gayathri for attempting to kill Savitri and has her arrested. Finally, Vishwanath gives the dowry by taking debt to Somashekharayya and beats him very badly, when Ravi leaves the house making a cut with his father, which makes him remorseful after seeing all this and asks for Gayathri's forgiveness. Gayathri, who has just given birth to a baby boy forgives him. Somashekharayya return backs dowry to Vishwanath and he too pledges that no one would take nor receive any dowry henceforth in his family.

== Cast ==
- Kashinath as Vishwanath
- Bhavya as Uma
- Mukhyamantri Chandru as Somashekharayya, Gayathri's Father in law
- Tara as Gayathri, Vishwa's sister
- N. S. Rao as Kamadhenu Krishna Rao, Marriage broker
- Sihi Kahi Chandru as Subhash, Vishwa's colleague
- Kaminidharan as Vishwa & Gayathri's Mother
- Gora Bheema Rao as Uma's Father
- Bank Janardhan

== Soundtrack ==
S. No.	Song	Lyricist	Artist
1	"Manasidu Hakkiya Goodu"	Hamsalekha	S. P. Balasubrahmanyam, Latha Hamsalekha
2	"Neenu Hatthiravididdare"	Hamsalekha	S. P. Balasubrahmanyam, Vani Jairam
3	"Hey Hudugi"	Hamsalekha	S. P. Balasubrahmanyam, Vani Jairam
4	"Meese Hothha Gandasige"	Hamsalekha	S. P. Balasubrahmanyam
5	"Poorvadalli Chandra Bandaru"	Hamsalekha	(Chorus)

== Legacy ==
The song "Meese Hottha Gandasige Demandappo Demandu" inspired a 1999 film of same name also starring Kashinath.
