= Soundarya (film) =

Indian Kannada-language family drama film

- VCD cover
- Directed by: E. Channagangappa
- Screenplay by: E. Channagangappa
- Story by: E. Channagangappa
- Produced by: D. Ramachandra; Ganapathi Prabhu; R. Govinda Raju; H. G. Raghavendra
- Starring: Ramesh Aravind; Sakshi Sivanand
- Cinematography: R. Giri
- Edited by: M. N. Swamy
- Music by: Hamsalekha
- Production company: Shirdi Sai Combines
- Release date: 20 April 2007
- Country: India
- Language: Kannada

Soundarya is a 2007 Indian Kannada-language family drama film written and directed by E. Channagangappa and starring Ramesh Aravind, Sakshi Sivanand and Baby Shreya.

== Cast ==
- Ramesh Aravind as Ramesh
- Sakshi Sivanand as Soundarya
- Shriya Sharma as Varsha
- Rahul Dev as Prakash
- Avinash
- Gajar Khan as Johny
- Shobaraj
- Keerthiraj
- Bank Janardhan
- Gayathri Prabhakar

== Production ==
This film is about how land mafias affect innocent people. Ramesh Aravind plays a chemical engineer in the film.

== Soundtrack ==
Soundarya

Soundtrack album by Hamsalekha
- Released: 6 February 2007
- Genre: Soundtrack
- Length: 31:50
- Label: Anand Audio

Hamsalekha scored the film's background music and composed its soundtrack. The rights for the soundtrack album were bought by Anand Audio.

All lyrics are written by Hamsalekha.

Track listing
No.	Title	Singer(s)	Length
1.	"Alli Nodu Alli Nodu"	Sonu Nigam, Shreya Ghoshal, Nandini Hamsalekha	4:54
2.	"Belakininda Baanella Banna"	Sonu Nigam	5:23
3.	"Hrudayada Mathu"	Kunal Ganjawala, Anuradha Bhat	5:21
4.	"Sneha Preethi"	Adnan Sami	5:05
5.	"Soundarya Soundarya"	Sonu Nigam, K. S. Chithra	5:23
6.	"Ella Ee Hennige"	Kalpana	5:45
Total length:			31:50

== Reception ==
A critic from Sify wrote, "It is a feel good sentiments entertainer about relationships packaged with a lovely family, good music, neat performances and class cinematography.". R. G. Vijayasarathy of IANS wrote, "Soundarya is a film for all the sections of the audience". A critic from Rediff.com said, "Soundarya is different from the run of the mill films you see every week, and will satisfy all those who like something new".
