= Gadibidi Krishna =

- Theatrical release poster
- Directed by: Sai Prakash
- Produced by: Bharathi Devi
- Starring: Shiva Rajkumar; Ravali; Indraja; Tara
- Cinematography: Vijayakumar
- Edited by: Narasaiah
- Music by: Hamsalekha
- Production company: Chinni Chitra
- Release date: 23 October 1998
- Running time: 139 min
- Country: India
- Language: Kannada

Gadibidi Krishna is a 1998 Indian Kannada-language action drama film, written and directed by Om Sai Prakash and produced by Bharati Devi. It stars Shiva Rajkumar, Ravali and Indraja. The musical score is by Hamsalekha. The film is a remake of the Telugu film, Sommokadidi Sokokadidi.

== Plot ==
The film depicts identical twins, a city-bred doctor and a villager, who swap identities for personal gain. Chaos ensues.

Krishna, a village simpleton, visits the city. One day, he comes across his lookalike: Dr. Shivram. Krishna starts plotting to take Dr. Shivram's place and swap his difficult existence for a life of urban comfort. But he soon realizes that Dr. Shivram has his own problems.

Shivram too discovers that he has a lookalike and visits Krishna's home. When he arrives, he learns that he and Krishna were identical twins separated at birth. Thugs kidnap Shivram for money, but Krishna and his family manage to defeat them. By the end of the film, the brothers are reunited.

== Cast ==
- Shiva Rajkumar as Krishna / Dr. Shivram (Double Role)
- Ravali
- Indraja
- C. R. Simha
- Tara
- B. V. Radha
- Avinash
- Sihi Kahi Chandru
- Ramesh Bhat
- Vani shree
- Kunigal Nagabhushan
- Mysore Ramanand
- Mandeep Rai
- Mandya Ramesh
- M. S. Karanth
- Vaasu Dev
- Anil Kumar
- Bharath Kumar
- Pushpa Swamy
- Mandya Ramesh
- Charulatha as Special Appearance in the Song

== Soundtrack ==
All the songs were composed and written by Hamsalekha.

Sl No	Song title	Singer(s)
1	"Taka Taka Takaisu"	S. P. Balasubrahmanyam, Sowmya Raoh
2	"Ene Idu"	S. P. Balasubrahmanyam, Latha Hamsalekha
3	"Raadha Raadha"	S. P. Balasubrahmanyam, Sowmya Raoh
4	"Thamma Thamma"	Rajkumar
5	"Kanasina TV"	Rajesh Krishnan, Sowmya Raoh
6	"Baare Baare"	Rajesh Krishnan, Rathnamala Prakash
