= Be-Shaque =

- Poster
- Directed by: Kashinath
- Written by: Bhooshanbanamali (dialogues)
- Screenplay by: Kashinath
- Story by: Kashinath
- Starring: Mithun Chakraborty; Yogeeta Bali; Amrish Puri; Shakti Kapoor
- Cinematography: Gowri Shankar B. C.
- Edited by: A. Subramanyam
- Music by: Usha Khanna
- Release date: 28 November 1980
- Running time: 120 minutes
- Country: India
- Language: Hindi

Be-Shaque (transl. For sure) is a 1980 Indian Hindi-language thriller drama film directed by Kashinath, starring Mithun Chakraborty, Yogeeta Bali, Amrish Puri and Shakti Kapoor. It is a remake of his own Kannada directorial Aparichita.

== Plot ==
Shyam Sunder lives a wealthy lifestyle in a small village in India along with his widowed stepmother, Nirmala. He has taken to alcohol and womanizing, and goes away very often without informing anyone. He frequently asks Nirmala for money. One day a villager Lakhiya informs Nirmala that he has seen Shyam's dead body. She arrives with other villagers but finds the dead carcass of a bear. Lakhiya informs the police. Nirmala is in a secret relationship with Mishra. Subsequently, a young man named Prakash arrives there & meets with Nirmala. He tells her that he is Shyam's friend and an author by profession. He is given a village tour by Nirmala's servant Gangu who later informs of villagers' whereabouts. She permits him to live in her spacious house but subsequently asks him to move to the guest house as told by Mishra. Prakash meets and falls in love with Roopa who lives a middle-class lifestyle with her widowed mother Radha, servant Gopal. Prakash overpowers goons sent by Mishra. Shyam had made villager Gauri pregnant who committed suicide as he did not marry her. Prakash informs Nirmala that he is doing business with Shyam & they were to get Rs 10 lakhs. Prakash denies her receiving Shyam's share & business' details. Shyam before his absence had a quarrel with Nirmala for money and threatened to expose her relationship with Mishra. Soon Roopa also falls in love with Prakash. Prakash comes across a framed photograph of Roopa with a young man & a child in her arms in Gopal's house. Then Prakash is told about an abandoned house that has a ghastly secret. Roopa introduces him to her mom, who approves of him. He tells that he is the son of Lucknow-based Tehsildar Somshekhar. Prakash finds a body but is hit on the head. He finds the body gone on waking. Rest needs to be seen.

== Cast ==
- Mithun Chakraborty as Prakash
- Yogeeta Bali as Roopa
- Shakti Kapoor as Mohan
- Amrish Puri as Gopal
- Jalal Agha as Mishra
- Sonia Sahni as Nirmala
- Suresh Chatwal as Police Officer
- Paintal as Gangu
- Mohan Choti as Lakhiya
- Asha Chandra as Gauri
- Vinod R. Mulani as Shyam Sunder

== Soundtrack ==
Lyrics: Anjaan, Nandi Khanna, Ravinder Rawal

1. "Preetam Tum Mere Rahoge Sada" - Usha Khanna, Suresh Wadkar
2. "Aa Jayena Aayena" - Asha Bhosle
3. "Haseen Haseen Wadiyon" - Anwar
4. "Uthao Jaam Masti Men" - Anwar

== Awards ==
Uttar Pradesh's Film Journalists' Association – Best Suspense Film of the Year
