= 12AM Madhyarathri =

- Promotional poster
- Directed by: Karthik
- Written by: Karthik
- Produced by: Prathima Vijayakumar
- Starring: Abhimanyu Kashinath; Divya Shridhar; Kashinath
- Cinematography: G. V. Umapathy
- Edited by: T. Govardhan
- Music by: Songs: V. Manohar; Score: Rajesh Ramanath
- Production companies: Sri Gayathri Productions; Vijaya Cine Kanasu
- Distributed by: Kashinath Producer Training Institute
- Release date: 10 August 2012
- Country: India
- Language: Kannada

12AM Madhyarathri (transl. 12 a.m. midnight) is a 2012 Indian Kannada-language horror drama film directed by Karthik and starring Abhimanyu Kashinath, Divya Shridhar and Kashinath. The film was released on 10 August 2012 to mixed-to-positive reviews from critics who praised the film's technicality while criticised its editing.

Abhimanyu Kashinath was nominated by the Bangalore Times Film Awards 2012 for Promising Newcomer - Male.

== Cast ==
- Abhimanyu Kashinath as Trishul
- Divya Shridhar as Shalini
- Kashinath as Professor
- Theju
- Mamatha Raut

== Soundtrack ==
The music was composed by Umapathy, Kashinath's younger brother.

== Reception ==
A critic from The Times of India rated the film three out of five and wrote that "The director makes an impressive start to the story with the suspense element in the forest, but fails to keep the same tempo in the second half with silly sequences which could be edited by at least 20 minutes". A critic from IANS wrote that "12 AM Madhyarathri has good technical element, but story wise it has the same ghost seeking revenge theme and same techniques are used to scare audiences that were seen in the 1960s and 1970s movies. Initially these scary elements will shock, but after some time they fail to make an impact". A critic from Chitratara.com wrote that "The sound effects, graphics, night effect shooting by Umapathi are on high standards. You have to hold your breath quite often while watching this film".
