= Rambhe Urvashi Menake =

Indian comedy drama film

- VCD cover
- Directed by: Arjun
- Written by: Arjun
- Produced by: M B Babu; Padma Gowda
- Starring: Kashinath; Uttara; Akhila; Nisha; Vahini
- Cinematography: Surendranath
- Edited by: S Prasad
- Music by: Hamsalekha
- Production company: Ram Babu Productions
- Release date: 15 February 1999
- Country: India
- Language: Kannada

Rambhe Urvashi Menake is a 1999 Indian Kannada-language comedy drama film directed by Arjun and starring Kashinath and Uttara with Akhila, Nisha and Vahini in the titular roles.

== Cast ==
- Kashinath
- Uttara as Tilaka
- Akhila
- Nisha
- Vahini
- Ashalatha
- M. N. Lakshmi Devi
- Kunigal Nagabhushan
- Vaijanath Biradar
- Mandeep Roy
- Girija Lokesh
- Bank Janardhan
- Honnavalli Krishna

== Production ==
The film was launched in Bangalore in late 1998. The film was shot for a week in White Horse, Subramanya Nagar, Bangalore, and the rest of the shoot was completed in Thirthahalli. The film unit returned to Bangalore to shoot a song.

== Music ==
Rambhe Urvashi Menake

Soundtrack album by Hamsalekha
- Released: 1999
- Genre: Feature film soundtrack
- Length: 13:19
- Language: Kannada

Hamsalekha chronology
Tuvvi Tuvvi Tuvvi (1999)	Rambhe Urvashi Menake (1999)	Sambhrama (1999)

The film has music composed by Hamsalekha.

Track listing
No.	Title	Length
1.	"Achhe Bili Manasinali"	4:32
2.	"Hai Hai Rambha"	4:34
3.	"Deal Deal"	4:13
Total length:		13:19

== Reception ==
Srikanth Srinivasa of the Deccan Herald wrote that "A couple of songs by Hamsalekha are soothing to the ears" and added that the heroine "has turned out a good performance Kashinath has truly lived up to his image and is hilarious as ever".
