= Kalavida (1997 film) =

Film by V. Ravichandran

- Directed by: V. Ravichandran
- Written by: Ravichandran
- Produced by: Ravichandran
- Starring: V. Ravichandran; Heera Rajagopal; Roja
- Cinematography: G. V. S. Seetharam
- Edited by: Suresh Urs
- Music by: Hamsalekha
- Production company: Eeshwari Productions
- Release date: 8 January 1997
- Running time: 142 minutes
- Country: India
- Language: Kannada

Kalavida (transl. Artist) is a 1997 Kannada-language film produced, written, directed and enacted by V. Ravichandran. The rest of the cast includes Heera Rajagopal, Roja, Umashree, Raghuvaran amongst others.

The music was composed by Hamsalekha and was declared a musical hit upon release.

== Plot ==
Kavana buys a painting of her favorite artist Vishwa. She accidentally ruins it. Her brother is a police and is investigating a girl's murder. He informs her that Vishwa was in love with a girl. After she died, Vishwa has become mentally ill and his family is too busy to help him get treatment.

Feeling bad about her favorite artist, Kavana decides to go to Vishwas's house as a nurse along with her father who is a doctor. Gradually, she learns that Vishwa's love interest was Prema, a model. Prema hid the fact of being a model from her blind mother who stayed in their house in a village. Prema and Vishwa truly loved each other.

One day in a competition, another model wanted to win the title. Seeing Prema as a threat to the title, her rival's boyfriend kill Prema in an amusement park. Although Vishwa rushed, but couldn't save Prema. The shock has made Vishwa forget everything except Prema.

Kavana, gradually improves Vishwa's condition, makes him dine with the family. During her last stage in curing Vishwa completely, he becomes excited. As he has believed Kavana to be his Prema all these days, he unknowingly rapes her. Later, Kavana goes to Vishwa's house, explains everything to his family and tells them her true identity, asks them to accept her into their family. But Vishwa's family rejects and talks ill about her. Vishwa regains consciousness, becomes normal and now understands what he has done to Kavana. He reaches his house and admonishes his family, their words at girl who brought light to his life.

As he now remembers everything, Vishwa goes to kill Prema's killer. He kills him the same way, in the same park as Prema was killed. The film ends with a happy note of Vishwa and Kavana visiting Prema's house wherein Kavana dresses and talks like Prema as Prema's mother doesn't know that her daughter has died long back.

== Cast ==
- Ravichandran as Vishwa, an artist, Prema's love interest. He becomes mentally ill after Prema's murder
- Roja as Kavana, Vishwa's fan who help him get well
- Heera Rajagopal as Prema, a model, Vishwa's love interest, later dies
- Raghuvaran as Prema's killer
- Dolly Minhas
- Umashree as Prema's mother
- Vaishali Kasaravalli as Vishwa's mother
- Anjali Sudhakar
- Chi. Guru Dutt as Kavana's brother, an investigation officer, aka kadlekayi
- B. V. Radha as doctor (guest appearance)
- Ramesh Bhat as Kavana's father, a doctor
- Lohithaswa as Vishwa's father
- Shivaram as Vishwa's house help
- Umesh

== Production ==
During the shoot, Ravichandran fell and had a spinal injury after his horse hit a lamp at Cubbon Park.

== Soundtrack ==
Kalavida

Soundtrack album by Hamsalekha
- Released: 1997
- Genre: Feature film soundtrack
- Length: 39:42
- Language: Kannada
- Label: Jhankar Music

Hamsalekha chronology
Stree (1996)	Kalavida (1997)	Lakshmi Mahalakshmi (1997)

All lyrics are written by Hamsalekha; all music is composed by Hamsalekha.

No.	Title	Singer(s)	Length
1.	"Hoova Roja Hoova"	Mano	4:46
2.	"Hey Navile Nanna Navile -Male"	S. P. Balasubrahmanyam	5:17
3.	"O Tuntiye"	Hariharan, S. Janaki	4:55
4.	"Hey Navile Nanna Navile -Duet"	S. P. Balasubrahmanyam, K. S. Chitra	1997
5.	"Saavirake Obba"	S. Janaki	5:06
6.	"Iniya Iniya"	Mano, Swarnalatha	5:05
7.	"Andagara Alimayya"	S. P. Balasubrahmanyam, Swarnalatha	5:03
8.	"Ondu Bechane"	Mano	4:56
Total length:			39:42
