= Sarvabhouma =

- Directed by: Mahesh Sukhadhare
- Written by: Mahesh Sukhadhare, BA Madhu (Dialogues)
- Produced by: R Jagadish
- Starring: Shiva Rajkumar; Mayoori
- Cinematography: AR Mahendra
- Edited by: Basavaraj Urs
- Music by: Hamsalekha
- Release date: 30 July 2004
- Country: India
- Language: Kannada

Sarvabhouma is a 2004 Indian Kannada language drama film starring Shiva Rajkumar, Mayuri, Shilpa Anand, Sharath Lohitashwa, Rangayana Raghu and Vikram Ravichandran. It is directed by Mahesh Sukhadhare and music is composed by Hamsalekha. Shivaraj Kumar played the double role, including the lead role.

== Cast ==
- Shiva Rajkumar as Subhash Chandra / Jeeva
- Mayuri as Basanthi

== Production ==
The film was launched at Someshwara Temple at Ulsoor. The film saw Shivarajkumar playing the dual roles of father and son for the first time. This was Madhu's 62nd film as dialogue writer. According to the film's director Sukadhare, the film spoke about "the life of soldiers of pre independence time".

== Soundtrack ==
All songs were written and composed by Hamsalekha.

Sarvabhouma

Soundtrack album by Hamsalekha
- Released: 2004
- Genre: Feature film soundtrack
- Label: Manoranjan audio

No.	Title	Singer(s)	Length
1.	"Amma Neena Sevae"	Ramesh Chandra
2.	"Edege Gundina Maleya"	Chetan, Hemanth Kumar, Ramesh
3.	"Kalnan Magandee Prema"	K. S. Chitra, Hemanth Kumar
4.	"Karunaadina Koravanngi"	Hariharan, Anuradha Paudwal
5.	"Neena Carge Neene Driver"	Anup
6.	"Saare Jahanse Acha"	Anuradha Paudwal
7.	"Saare Jahan Se Acha"	Nanditha, Rajesh Krishnan
8.	"Selfishu Selfishu"	Kay Kay

== Critical reception ==
The Hindu wrote "Some jingoism and lot of yarns". However Sify praised the director that he "has handled the story with all seriousness".
