= Aparichita (1978 film) =

1978 film by Kashinath

- Poster
- Directed by: Kashinath
- Written by: Kashinath
- Produced by: Satyanarayana; Kashinath; Dattaatreya; Dodayya
- Starring: Suresh Heblikar; Shobha; M. V. Vasudeva Rao; Sundar Krishna Urs; Mohan
- Cinematography: B. C. Gowrishankar
- Music by: L. Vaidyanathan; Ramdas Nai
- Production company: Shree Gayathri Arts
- Release date: 26 March 1978
- Country: India
- Language: Kannada

Aparichita ( transl. The Unknown) is a 1978 Kannada-language romantic mystery thriller film directed by Kashinath, starring Suresh Heblikar, Sobha, M. V. Vasudeva Rao, Sundar Krishna Urs and Mohan. The music was composed by noted composer L. Vaidyanathan. The movie was critically acclaimed. Kashinath remade the movie in Hindi as Be-Shaque. The movie was also remade in Malayalam as Avano Atho Avalo. The film was dubbed in Telugu as Aparichitulu.

The forest setting of Aparichita inspired Vamsy to create a film entirely set in a forest, which ultimately led to the making of Anveshana (1985).

== Cast ==
- Suresh Heblikar as Prakash
- Shobha as Kusuma
- Vasudeva Rao as Rangaiah
- Sundar Krishna Urs as Mohan
- Mohan as Shamu

== Production ==
Kashinath cast his friend Suresh Heblikar in the lead role. They had previously collaborated for the short film Asima in the early 1970s. Heblikar recalled how precise Kashinath's narration of the story was that he could imagine the film running in his mind.

== Music ==
S. No	Song	Lyricist	Artist
1	"Ee Naada Anda"	P. R. Ramadas Naidu	S. P. Balasubrahmanyam
2	"Savi Nenapugalu Beku"	P. R. Ramadas Naidu	Vani Jairam

== Awards ==
Karnataka State Film Awards 1978–79

- Best Screenplay – Kashinath
- Best Child Actor – Master Prakash
