= Neenu Nakkare Haalu Sakkare =

- Directed by: Dorai–Bhagavan
- Screenplay by: Chi. Udayashankar
- Story by: Dorai–Bhagavan
- Starring: Vishnuvardhan; Srinath; Rupini; Vinaya Prasad; Chandrika
- Cinematography: J.G. Krishna
- Edited by: P. Bhaktavatsalam
- Music by: Hamsalekha
- Production company: Rajassu Films
- Release date: 16 April 1991
- Running time: 147 minutes
- Country: India
- Language: Kannada

Neenu Nakkare Haalu Sakkare is a 1991 Indian Kannada-language comedy film directed by Dorai–Bhagavan. It stars Vishnuvardhan in the lead role opposite five heroines. The music was composed by Hamsalekha. The story revolves round Subbu's (Vishnuvardhan) hunt for a suitable wife and how he eventually finds one, with many hilarious scenes. Ambareesh makes a cameo appearance.

== Cast ==
- Vishnuvardhan as Subba Rao aka Subbu
- Srinath as Pavan Kumar
- Ambareesh as himself (Cameo)
- Rupini as Rukmini
- Vinaya Prasad as Ramya
- Rajani as Lakshmi
- Chandrika as Urvashi
- Anjali Sudhakar as Sheela
- Balakrishna
- Mukhyamantri Chandru
- Umashree
- Ramesh Bhat as Raghupathi
- M. S. Umesh
- Ashalatha
- Shantamma

== Soundtrack ==
All songs were composed by Hamsalekha with lyrics by Chi. Udayashankar for all except "Baare Santhege" which was penned by Hamsalekha.

- "Cheluve Neenu Nakkare" - S. P. Balasubrahmanyam, Manjula Gururaj
- "Baare Santhege" - S. P. Balasubrahmanyam, K. S. Chithra
- "O Geleyane" - S.P.Balasubramaniam, Manjula Gururaj
- "Baanalli Ninninda" - K. S. Chithra
- "Baare Rukkamma" - S. P. Balasubrahmanyam, K. S. Chithra
- "Nooru Hennu Kandu" - S. P. Balasubrahmanyam, K. S. Chithra
