= Avane Nanna Ganda =

- VCD cover
- Directed by: S. Umesh; K. Prabhakar
- Produced by: K. Prabhakar
- Starring: Kashinath, Sudharani, M. P. Shankar
- Cinematography: Mallikaarjuna
- Edited by: S. Umesh
- Music by: Hamsalekha
- Production company: Vijaya Films
- Release date: 1989
- Language: Kannada

Avane Nanna Ganda is a 1989 Kannada-language film starring Kashinath and Sudharani. The film was directed by S. Umesh and K. Prabhakar for Vijay Films.

Most of the film's cast and crew reprises from the 1988 film Avale Nanna Hendthi.

== Cast ==
- Kashinath as Balu, cartoonist for Mahila Vaani
- Sudharani as Mangala
- Vanitha Vasu as Vanitha
- M. P. Shankar as Mullukatte Parandhamaiah
- Sudheer as Shankar
- C. R. Simha as Nanjunda
- Doddanna as Parandhamaiah's son
- Mysore Lokesh as Nanjunda's assistant
- Sundar Raj as Parandhamaiah's son
- Sihi Kahi Chandru as Vinayaka
- Rohith Srinath (credited as Master Rohith) as Ramachari
- K. Prabhakar
- Pranaya Murthy as Mangala's husband
- Anjali Sudhakar
- Pramila Joshai as Vyjayanthimala
- Uma Shivakumar as Gajendramma
- Kokila
- Nagaratnamma
- Kaminidharan as Mangala's mother
- P. R. Varalakshmi
- Nagaveni Nagabharana
- Aarathi (credited as Baby Aarathi) as Renuka
- Vishwa Vijetha
- Negro Johnny

== Soundtrack ==
The film was declared a musical hit with the songs and lyrics composed and tuned by Hamsalekha.

| S. No. | Song | Lyricist | Artist |
|---|---|---|---|
| 1 | "Hasiru Gaajina Balegale" | Hamsalekha | Latha Hamsalekha |
| 2 | "Vichara Hudugiyadadare" | Hamsalekha | S. P. Balasubrahmanyam |
| 3 | "Kaliyuga Manmathadasa" | Hamsalekha | S. P. Balasubrahmanyam, Shivaraj |
