= Idhu Unga Kudumbam =

- Poster
- Directed by: S. Umesh
- Produced by: G. K. Reddy
- Starring: Raghuvaran; Radhika; Urvashi
- Music by: Hamsalekha
- Release date: 10 July 1989
- Country: India
- Language: Tamil

Idhu Unga Kudumbam (transl. This is your family) is a 1989 Indian Tamil-language film directed by S.Umesh, starring Raghuvaran, Radhika and Urvashi. The film was released on 14 April 1989, and became a hit. It was remade in Kannada as Balina Daari.

== Cast ==
- Raghuvaran
- Radhika
- Urvashi

== Soundtrack ==
Soundtrack was composed by Hamsalekha.

Track listing
No.	Title	Singer(s)	Length
1.	"Vetri Murasu"	K. S. Chithra
2.	"Thavi Vantha"	K. J. Yesudas, S. Janaki
3.	"Muthuswamy"	Malaysia Vasudevan, K. S. Chithra
4.	"Ambalaikku Nenjil"	Malaysia Vasudevan, K. S. Chithra
5.	"Naanamo"	Malaysia Vasudevan, K. S. Chithra
