= Yuga Purusha =

- DVD cover
- Directed by: D. Rajendra Babu
- Written by: Chi. Udayashankar
- Screenplay by: D. Rajendra Babu
- Story by: Subhash Ghai
- Produced by: B. Anuradha Singh; R. Dushyanth Singh; R. Amrutha Singh
- Starring: Ravichandran; Khushbu; Moon Moon Sen; Vajramuni; Ramakrishna
- Cinematography: R. Madhusudhan
- Edited by: D. Rajagopal
- Music by: Hamsalekha
- Distributed by: Chandulal jain Films
- Release date: 4 May 1989
- Running time: 135 minutes
- Country: India
- Language: Kannada

Yuga Purusha is a 1989 Indian Kannada-language film directed by D. Rajendra Babu. The film stars Ravichandran and Khushbu. It is a remake of Bollywood movie Karz. The music for the film was composed by Hamsalekha. The movie is about reincarnation, where a man is murdered by his newly wedded wife in his past life for the sake of acquiring the man's property. After taking a new birth, the man takes revenge against his past life's wife. Like other Ravichandran movies released during the late 80s period, this was also the musical blockbuster of the year.

== Cast ==
- Ravichandran as Raaja
- Khushbu as Chithra
- Moon Moon Sen as Rani Kaamini Devi
- Ramakrishna as Ravivarma (Extended Cameo)
- Leelavathi as Shanthadevi
- Vajramuni as Anthony D'costa, Chithra's uncle
- Lokanath as Mr. Oberoy
- M. S. Umesh
- B. K. Shankar
- Mandeep Roy as Dr. Dayal
- Mukhyamantri Chandru as Sir Judah
- Neegro Johnny
- Lakshman Rao
- Rajanand
- Ananth Rao Maccheri
- Jyothi Gurucharan

== Soundtrack ==
The song "Yaavudo Ee Bombe" was used by Hamsalekha in the 1989 Telugu movie Muthyamantha Muddu as "Ichcohuko". The same song also used the tune of the line "Neenenayya Maayagaaranu" from the song "Sri Krishna Bandanu" in between.

All lyrics are written by Hamsalekha; all music is composed by Hamsalekha.

No.	Title	Singer(s)	Length
1.	"Sangeethave Nanna Devaru"	S. P. Balasubrahmanyam
2.	"Yaavudo Ee Bombe Yaavudo"	S. P. Balasubrahmanyam
3.	"Sri Krishna Bandanu"	S. P. Balasubrahmanyam
4.	"Bhoolokavella Naanu Suthi"	S. P. Balasubrahmanyam
5.	"Mutthe Prathama"	S. P. Balasubrahmanyam, Vani Jairam
6.	"Keli Premigale"	S. P. Balasubrahmanyam, Latha Hamsalekha
