= Muthina Haara =

- DVD cover
- Directed by: S. V. Rajendra Singh Babu
- Screenplay by: S. V. Rajendra Singh Babu
- Story by: V. M. Joshi
- Produced by: S. V. Rajendra Singh Babu
- Starring: Vishnuvardhan; Suhasini Maniratnam
- Cinematography: D. V. Rajaram
- Edited by: Gautam Raju
- Music by: Hamsalekha
- Production company: Rohini Pictures
- Distributed by: Rajassu; Sharaf Films
- Release date: 22 August 1990
- Running time: 162 minutes
- Country: India
- Language: Kannada

Mutthina Haara (transl. A Necklace of Pearls) is a 1990 Indian Kannada-language war drama film directed by Rajendra Singh Babu. It stars Vishnuvardhan and Suhasini Maniratnam in the lead roles. K. S. Ashwath, Kavya and Ramkumar feature in supporting roles. The film speaks of the toll of warfare on a soldier's family. A portion of the core plot of the film is partially based on Ernest Hemingway's 1929 novel, A Farewell to Arms.

== Plot ==
Achchappa, serving as a jawan in the British Indian Army in Burma, is injured while the World War II is raging. He is tended to by a nurse, Lieutenant Annapurna. She also hails from the same region in Karnataka as he, Coorg. They fall in love with each other and get married after the end of the war. Achchappa returns to work leaving Annapurna, who has now quit her job, with her in-laws; father-in-law Belliappa has retired as a havaldar. Annapurna gives birth to a son, Veeraraju, but childbirth complications lead to her uterus being removed to save her life, leaving her unable to bear another child.

In 1952, Achchappa stationed in Korea, is transferred to India's Rajasthan. Having been away from home for a few years now, he longs to see his young son. His wife and son travel to meet him in Rajasthan's desert, where he currently stationed. An airstrike by the enemy takes Veeraraju's life before Achchappa gets to see him. Achchappa and Annapurna are aggrieved; Annapurna rejoins the army as a nurse. Despite her insistence, Achchappa refuses to remarry for the sake of having another child. They remain faithful to each other as years pass by. They also ensure that their parents back home are not made known about their son's death.

Achchappa, now a Major, trains young cadets in the Indian Military Academy, Dehradun. Not having met him and his family for over ten years, his aged parents come over to see them. A guilt-ridden Annapurna reveals to them about their son's death and Achchappa's unwell mother dies from the shock. Meanwhile, another war has broken out and Achchappa is sent to India's snow-covered border region with his troop. His troop and he are captured by the enemy and taken to their territory, and are tortured to reveal a certain military secret. However, Achchappa refuses to give in and endures the pain inflicted. In his troop is a young and promising soldier, Mohan Naik, who Achchappa treats as his son. The two manage to escape into India's territory but are mortally wounded. Achappa dies there while his protégé dies in the army hospital, before revealing to Annapurna, now a Major, about the former's death. Achchappa is given a state funeral back home, while Annapurna loses her sanity.

== Cast ==
- Vishnuvardhan as Achchappa
- Suhasini Maniratnam as Annapurna
- K. S. Ashwath as Belliappa
- Ramkumar as Naik Mohan
- Sihi Kahi Chandru as Menasinakai, a barber
- Sadashiva Brahmavar as Chengappa
- Master Anand as Veeraraju
- Kavya
- Prakash Raj as a soldier

== Production ==
Parvathamma Rajkumar clapped the shot during the film's launch. After Suhasini Maniratnam was not present on location in Mysore, the shoot was shifted to Bangalore. To help set the film in 1965, S. V. Rajendra Singh Babu hired seven assistant directors. Tableware and chairs were brought from Burma. To make hospitals look British, a British flag was made and anti-war photos and anti-Hitler slogans were photocopied. Ten Tibetans helped make military sweaters for 500 people, who were portraying military soldiers. The film was shot for more than 30 days in Kashmir. Singh Babu revealed they "shot the film in fear throughout". The schedule did not progress as planned "because of frequent disturbances and exchange of fire between the Indian forces and separatist elements" and they did not allow Suhasini to attend the shoot so Singh Babu had to talk to the then Chief Minister of Kashmir, Farooq Abdullah to let her enter the shooting spot. During the shoot on 17 October 1989, Vishnuvardhan survived a fall from 900 feet (270 m) after his parachute failed to deploy. Vishnuvardhan had to wear several different outfits for the film including military uniform, traditional clothing in Madikeri, forest clothing and woolen clothing for the foggy region. The film was also shot at Talacauvery and other places in Kodagu and also at Jaisalmer, Rajasthan. The film was shot for a total of 120 days.

== Soundtrack ==
Hamsalekha composed the music and also written the lyrics for all the songs. The composing sessions were held in Bangalore and Mysore. According to Singh Babu, the lyrics of the song "Devaru Hoseda" compares four seasons of the nature with four phases of the human life. When Babu and Hamsalekha met M. Balamuralikrishna to sing this song, he initially refused; however he agreed after repeated requests. The recording took place at Prasad Studios, Chennai from "9 pm and concluded at around 3 am the next day" as Balamuralikrishna was dissatisfied "with his intonation and wanted to reach perfection. Hence, there were many rehearsals."

Track listing
No.	Title	Singer(s)	Length
1.	"Madikeri Sipaayi"	S. P. Balasubrahmanyam, K. S. Chithra	4:40
2.	"Kodaginolu Bedaginolu"	S. P. Balasubrahmanyam	5:13
3.	"Saaru Saaru Miltry Saaru"	S. P. Balasubrahmanyam, Latha Hamsalekha	5:01
4.	"Kodagina Veera"	S. P. Balasubrahmanyam, K. S. Chithra	5:56
5.	"Devaru Hoseda Premada Daara"	M. Balamuralikrishna, K. S. Chithra	6:01
Total length:			26:51

== Release ==
According to Singh Babu, the film did well in urban areas but not in rural areas.

== Awards ==
38th National Film Awards

- Best Feature Film in Kannada — Rajendra Singh Babu

1990–91 Karnataka State Film Awards

- First Best Film — Rajendra Singh Babu
- Best Supporting Actor — K. S. Ashwath
- Best Cinematographer — D. V. Rajaram

38th Filmfare Awards South

- Best Actress – Kannada — Suhasini Maniratnam

1991 International Film Festival of India

- Screened in mainstream section
