= Anantana Avantara =

1989 film by Kashinath

- VCD cover
- Directed by: Kashinath
- Screenplay by: Kashinath
- Story by: Gayathri Cine Creations
- Produced by: Kashinath
- Starring: Kashinath; Anjali; Aravind; Dinesh
- Cinematography: G. V. Umapathy
- Edited by: A. Subrahmanyam
- Music by: Hamsalekha
- Production company: Sri Gayathri Productions
- Release date: 5 January 1989
- Running time: 138 minutes
- Country: India
- Language: Kannada
- Budget: ₹15 lakh
- Box office: ₹1 crore

Anantana Avantara ( transl. Anantha's urgencies) is a 1989 Indian Kannada-language adult comedy film directed by and starring Kashinath. It was the debut movie of the actress Anjali in a full-fledged lead role. The movie is a light–hearted comedy about the ordeals of a newly married man. It set a trend in the comic films in Kannada and established Kashinath as a comic story teller. However, at the time of release, the movie met with several controversies primarily for the taboo subject on which the story was built. Some even considered the movie to have made a negative impact on the youngsters of that time. The movie also introduced Upendra as the lyrics writer and assistant director who also appeared as Kamadeva in one of the songs. The movie was dubbed in Telugu in the same year as Vintha Sobhanam and in Hindi as Namkeen Honeymoon in 1991. The movie was remade in Telugu in 2006 as Please Sorry Thanks.

== Plot ==
Ananth has a small business and runs a small office. He is an introvert and is awkward around women. His secretary, Deepa, is a young lady who wants to marry him but has never expressed her feelings verbally. Ananth acts as if he is not interested in her but is attracted to her as well.

He meets Menaka (Anjali) in a road accident where he nurses her and drops her home. They are neighbors and after a few awkward meetings, they fall in love. They get married soon after as both of their parents are happy about their relationship.

Deepa, though, is jealous of her Boss' married life and plans to ruin it. She used to procure tablets for his sexual wellness before and plans to mess with the tablets. She instead gets the tablet which does away with sexual desire in men and hands it over to Ananth as he leaves for his honeymoon. The honeymoon is botched as the tablets take effect. They also meet another couple on honeymoon where the husband is over enthusiastic about sex which makes the wife take regressive measures. A few days of confusion and chaos follows and Anjali's mother is now convinced that they should get a divorce.

As a last attempt, Ananth is sent to a lady psychiatrist who examines and gives him confidence that he is all right. The second couple's wife tries to escape from her husband and sleeps in Ananth's room. Ananth rushes into his room and to the sleeping lady thinking it is his wife. Anjali arrives to her room to see her husband with another woman and she decides to divorce now, supported by her mother and granny. After his failed attempts to explain the situation Ananth lifts and carries Anjali into her room to show her he is a man and woos her with his romance. She accepts him finally.

== Cast ==
- Kashinath as Ananthu
- Anjali Sudhakar as Menake
- Prathibha as Personal Assistant of Ananthu
- M. N. Lakshmi Devi as Rambe - Menake's grandmother who gives Ajji Lehya
- Dinesh as neighbouring room guy in the hotel with high testosterone
- Kavitha as Dinesh's wife
- Shankhanaada Aravind as Menake's Father
- Ramachandra
- Saroja Srishailan as Ananthu's Mother
- Pundalika Shet as doctor who gives special tablets
- Om Ganesh as a bell boy at the hotel
- Sihi Kahi Geetha as Psychiatrist
- Upendra as Lord Kamdev in song "Come on Kamanna"

== Soundtrack ==
Music scored and lyrics written by Hamsalekha, V. Manohar and Upendra.

- "Chaligalavu Banthu" - S. P. Balasubrahmanyam, Lata Hamsalekha
- "Come on Come on Kamanna" - S. P. Balasubrahmanyam
- "Navaratriyolage" - Latha Hamsalekha, Shivaraj
- "Neeniruve Saniha" - Latha Hamsalekha
