= Vaijanath Biradar =

Indian comedian-film actor

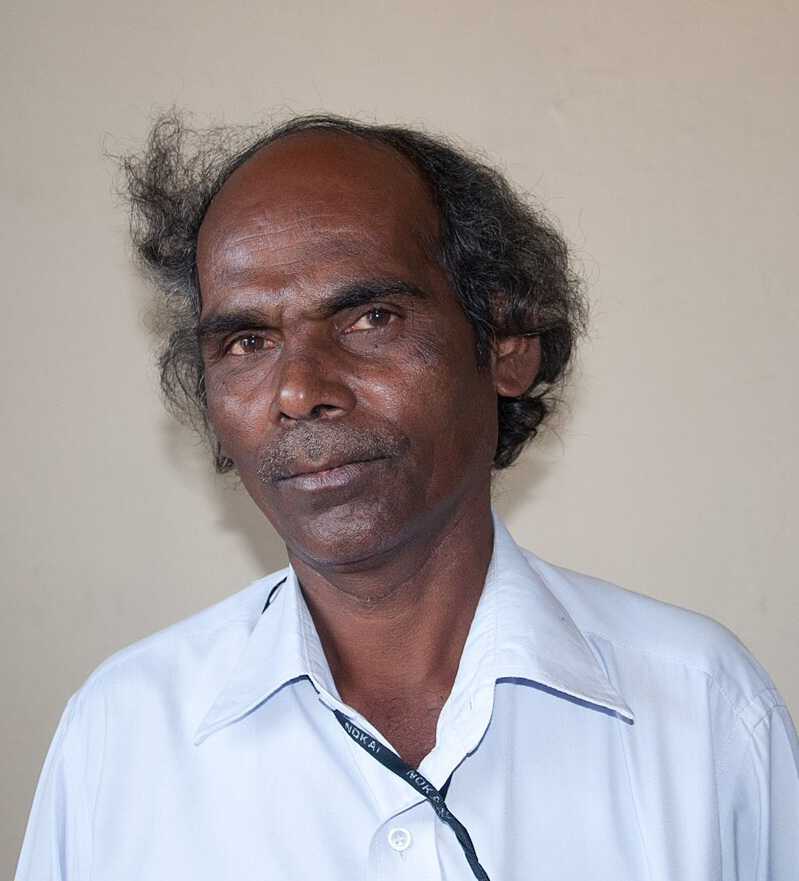
- Born: Vaijanath Basappa Biradar; 26 June 1952 (age 74); Tegampur, Bhalki, Bidar, Karnataka, India
- Occupations: Film actor, stage actor
- Known for: Kanasemba Kudureyaneri
- Parents: Basappa Biradar (father); Nagamma Biradar (mother)
- Awards: Filmfare (2011)

Vaijanath Basappa Biradar is an Indian comedian and actor who works in Kannada cinema. He has acted nearly 500 movies in Kannada.

He was awarded the top one best actor in the 2011 India Imagine film festival that took place in Madrid, Spain for his performance in the Kannada film Kanasemba Kudureyaneri directed by Girish Kasaravalli in 2010.

== Personal life ==
Vaijanath Biradar was born on 26 June 1952 to Basappa Biradara and Nagamma in the village called Tegampur in Bhalki taluk of Bidar district of northern Karnataka.

== Selected filmography ==
- Love Training (1993)
- Shhh (1993)
- Aliya Alla Magala Ganda (1997)
- O Mallige (1997)
- Rambhe Urvashi Menake (1999)
- Jipuna Nanna Ganda (2001)
- Dr. B. R. Ambedkar (2005; English)
- Mata (2006)
- Care of Footpath (2006)
- Kanasemba Kudureyaneri (2010)
- Soombe (2011; Tulu)
- Karataka Damanaka (2024)
- Urabba (2026)
