= Kunigal Nagabhushan =

Indian actor (1942–2013)

- Born: Kunigal Nagabhushan; 6 December 1942; Kunigal, Tumkur, Karnataka
- Died: 23 June 2013 (aged 70); Bangalore, India
- Other names: K. S. Nagabhushan, K. S. Nagabhushana, K. Nagabhushan, Kunigal Bhushan, K. S. Nagesh
- Education: Degree in cinematography
- Occupations: Film actor; dialogue writer; director
- Children: 2

Kunigal Nagabhushan (6 December 1942 – 23 June 2013) was an Indian actor in the Kannada film industry. His films include S.P. Sangliyana 2 (1990), C.B.I. Shankar (1989), Daari Tappida Maga (1975).

== Career ==
Kunigal Nagabhushan had contributed to more than three hundred Kannada films, as actor, dialogue writer and assistant director.

== Selected filmography ==
Director

1. Ashirvada (1975)
2. Baalu Jenu (1976)

Writer

1. Golmaal Radhakrishna (1990)
2. Ganeshana Maduve (1990)
3. Golmaal Radhakrishna 2 (1991)
4. Gauri Ganesha (1991)
5. Solillada Saradara (1992)
6. Nagaradalli Nayakaru (1992)
7. Gadibidi Krishna (1998)
8. Swalpa Adjust Madkolli (2000)

Actor

- Maria My Darling (1980) (also in Tamil)
- Yaarigoo Helbedi (1992)
- Amruthavarshini (1997)
- Ammavra Ganda (1997)
- Rambhe Urvashi Menake (1999)
- Mane Magalu (2003)
- Ramasamy Krishnasamy (2003)
- Kiladi Krishna (2010)
- Gokula Krishna (2012)

== Awards ==
Year	Award	Film	Credits	Category	Result	Ref
1994-95	Karnataka State Film Award	Yarigu Helbedi	Dialogue writer	Best Dialogue	Won	
1991-92	Karnataka State Film Award	Gauri Ganesha	Dialogue writer	Best Dialogue	Won	
2011	Kempegowda Award	-NA-	Contribution to films	-NA-	Won	

== See also ==
- List of people from Karnataka
- Cinema of Karnataka
- List of Indian film actors
- Cinema of India
