= Bank Janardhan =

Indian actor (1949–2025)

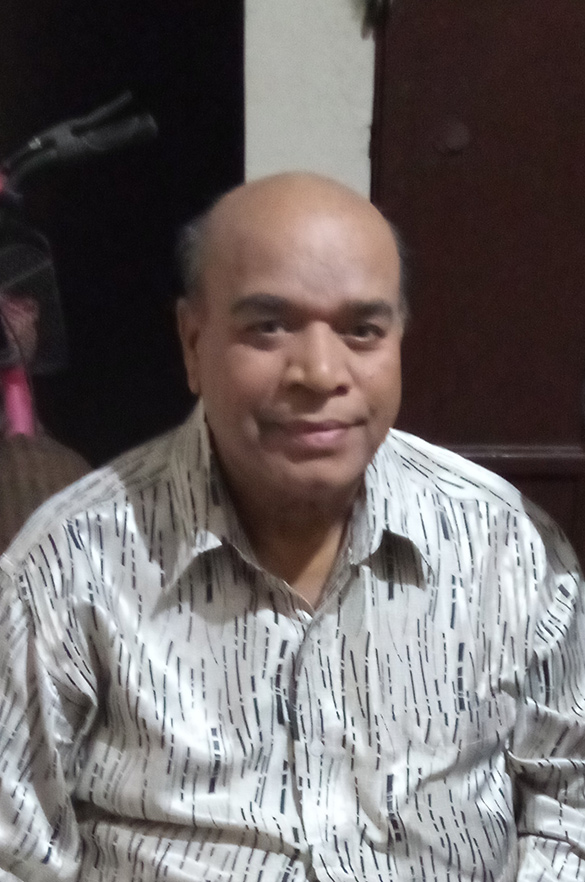
- Born: Janardhan Rao Chauhan; 2 March 1949; Holalkere, Chitradurga district, Mysore State, India
- Died: 13 April 2025 (aged 76); Bangaluru, Karnataka, India
- Resting place: Hebbal, Bengaluru, Karnataka
- Occupation: Actor
- Years active: 1985–2024

Janardhan Rao (2 March 1949 – 13 April 2025), known by his stage name Bank Janardhan, was an Indian actor in the Kannada film industry. He was well-known for his comedy and drama roles in various Kannada films and television series. Some of the notable films of Janardhan as an actor include News (2005), Shhh! (1993) and Tharle Nan Maga (1992). He acted in Kannada television serials such as Papa Pandu. Janardhan died after a long illness in Bangaluru, Karnataka, on 13 April 2025, at the age of 76.

== Partial filmography ==
Year	Films	Role	Notes
1985	Pithamaha		
1986	Bettada Thayi		
1987	Thaliya Aane		
1987	Bazar Bheema		
1988	Thayigobba Karna		
1988	Praja Prabhuthva		
1988	Jaya Nayaka		
1989	Raja Yuvaraja		
1989	Jockey		
1989	Doctor Krishna		
1989	Deva		
1990	Tiger Gangu		
1990	Rudra Thandava		
1990	Ramarajyadalli Rakshasaru		
1990	Policena Hendthi		
1991	Ajagajantara		
1991	Gauri Ganesha		
1992	Tharle Nan Maga	Parandamaiah Urbagal	
1992	Bombat Hendthi		
1992	Belliyappa Bangarappa		
1992	Ganesha Subramanya		
1992	Bharjari Gandu		
1993	Shhh!		
1993	Rupayi Raja		
1994	September 8		Tulu film
1995	Aata Hudugata	Mohan	
1997	Cheluva		
1997	Lady Commissioner		
1998	Kowrava		
1998	Bhama Sathyabhama		
1998	Karnataka Police		
1999	Jayasoorya		
1999	Aryabhata		
1999	Rambhe Urvashi Menake		
2000	Hats Off India		
2000	Astra		
2000	Khiladi		
2001	Jipuna Nanna Ganda		
2001	Shivappanayaka		
2001	Mr. Harischandra	Hanumesh	
2002	Olu Saar Bari Olu	Houseowner	
2002	H2O		
2002	Balagalittu Olage Baa		
2002	Makeup		
2003	Shri Kalikamba	Roadside shop worker	Simultaneously shot in Tamil as Annai Kaligambal
2003	Mooru Manasu Nooru Kanasu	Film producer	
2003	Hey Nan Bheeshma Kano		
2003	Thayi Illada Thabbali		
2003	Raktha Kanneeru		
2004	Super Aliya		
2004	Ajju		
2004	Agodella Olledakke		
2004	Swetha Naagu		
2004	Hasige Iddashtu Kalu Chachu		
2004	Nija		
2004	Ranga SSLC		
2004	Aha Nanna Tangi Madhve		
2005	Mr. Bakra		
2005	Ugra Narasimha		
2005	Kashi from Village		
2005	Nanna Love Madthiya		
2005	News		
2005	Moorkha		
2006	7 O' Clock	Train Ticket Collector	
2006	Chellata	Ramprasad	
2007	Soundarya		
2007	Maathaad Maathaadu Mallige		
2007	Hettare Hennane Herabeku		
2007	Ekadantha		
2007	Circle Rowdy		
2008	Kodagana Koli Nungitha		
2008	Navashakthi Vaibhava		
2008	Birse		
2009	KA-99 B-333		
2009	Minchu		
2009	Nannedeya Haadu		
2009	Bettadapurada Ditta Makkalu		
2009	Gilli		
2009	10th Class A Sec		
2010	Preethiya Theru		
2010	Crazy Kutumba		
2010	Kiladi Krishna		
2010	Bombat Car	Waiter	
2010	Nooru Janmaku		
2010	Idre Gopi Bidre Papi		
2010	Banni		
2010	Chandulli Cheluve		
2010	Lift Kodla		
2010	Vichitra Premi		
2010	Nannavanu		
2010	Naa Rani Nee Maharani		
2010	Holi		
2010	Aithalakkadi		
2010	Parole		
2010	Preethi Andre Ishtena		
2010	Narada Vijaya		
2011	Shravana		
2011	Double Decker		
2011	9 to 12		
2011	5 Idiots		
2011	Olavina Gelathi		
2011	Kadhimaru		
2011	Dudde Doddappa		
2011	Achchu Mechchu		
2011	Engagement		
2012	Tuglak		
2012	Love College		
2012	Namma Kalyani		
2012	Chitranna		
2012	Gagan Sakhi		
2013	Devarane		
2013	Sri Amareshwara Mahatme		
2013	Benki Birugali		
2014	Dosthi		
2014	Kalyanamasthu		
2014	Billion Dollar Baby		
2014	Gandhiji Kanasu		
2014	Power		
2016	Kotigobba 2		
2017	Once More Kaurava		
2017	Ambar Caterers		Tulu film
2022	Mata		
2023	Undenama		
2026	Simhapuriya Simha		Posthumous release

== See also ==
- List of people from Karnataka
- Cinema of Karnataka
- List of Indian film actors
- Cinema of India
