= Kashinath (actor) =

Indian actor

- Born: 8 May 1951; Kundapura, Karnataka, India
- Died: 18 January 2018 (aged 66); Bengaluru, Karnataka, India
- Occupations: Actor, filmmaker
- Years active: 1976–2018
- Spouse: Chandraprabha
- Children: 2

Kashinatha Hathwara (8 May 1951 – 18 January 2018) was an Indian actor and filmmaker who primarily worked in Kannada films. He also worked in Bollywood remakes of his films. With a career spanning over three decades, Kashinath acted in or directed over 40 films, usually comedies. He is credited for introducing new talents such as actor Upendra, musician V. Manohar, and director Sunil Kumar Desai, alongside many other technicians who went on to become successful in the Kannada film industry.

Making his debut as a director through the comedy-drama film Aparoopada Athithigalu (1976), Kashinath came into the limelight with the suspense thriller Aparichita (1978). He made his acting debut through the film Anubhava (1984). The same film was remade and directed by him in Hindi as Anubhav (1986), making it his first entry in Bollywood. Some of his other successful films include Anantana Avantara (1989), Avale Nanna Hendthi (1988), Ajagajantara (1991) and Hendathi Endare Heegarabeku (1995).

His films generally touched subjects which were often regarded as taboo in Indian society. He was also popular for his double entendre dialogues in his films.

== Early life ==
Kashinath was born on 8 May 1951 into a middle-class family in Markod, a village near Kundapura, Udupi District. His father G. Vasudeva Rao was a businessman and a trader and mother Saraswathi a homemaker. He was the second son of his parents followed by his elder brother Sathyanarayana and his younger brothers are Dattatreya, Ravi, and Umapathi along with their younger sister Gayathri. He spent his childhood in his birthplace and moved to Bangalore with his father.

== Career ==
=== Early career (1975–1990) ===
During his graduation in Bangalore, Kashinath made a short film titled Slip, "in the year 1971 or 1972". This encouraged him to enroll himself into a filmmaking troupe called "Aseema" along with contemporary filmmaker-actor and longtime acquaintance, Suresh Heblikar. In 1976, he borrowed money from his father and co-produced with P.R. Ramadas for his directorial debut Aparoopada Athitigalu, a comedy-drama. His second directorial film Aparichita in 1978 was a suspense thriller starring Suresh Heblikar, M. V. Vasudeva Rao, Sundar Krishna Urs and Shoba brought him wide appreciation and recognition. The film paved the way for many other thriller films and was considered to be the "trendsetter" in Kannada cinema.

The success of the project made him direct its Hindi version titled as Be-Shaque in 1981, starring Mithun Chakraborty. After a brief hiatus, in 1984, he took up acting career by casting himself in the lead role for the film Anubhava. The film was widely acclaimed and was considered bold during its time of release. The film had its music composed by L. Vaidyanathan with whom he shared a long-lasting rapport and also introduced lyricist-music director V. Manohar through the song "Hodeya Doora O Jothegara". The huge success of the film got him the offer to direct its Hindi remake titled as Anubhav (1986) starring Shekhar Suman and Padmini Kolhapure.

In Malayalam, the same film was dubbed as Aadhyate Anubhavam (1987). The film found multiple time releases and reached the classic status. Following this, he took up acting assignments offered by other directors and starred in some successful films such as Mithileya Seetheyaru (1988), Avale Nanna Hendthi (1988), Sura Sundaranga (1989), Manmatha Raja (1989) and Avane Nanna Ganda (1989).

His third directorial film Anamika (1987) could not repeat the success of his previous film. However, his next directed film Anantana Avantara (1989) was met with high popularity and success. His socially entertaining romantic films such as Avale Nanna Hendthi (1988) opposite Bhavya, Avane Nanna Ganda (1989) co-starring Sudharani and Chapala Chennigaraya (1990) opposite Kalpana were both commercial and critical success. This back to back success made Kashinath one of the most sought-after actors in the 1980s era.

=== Later career (1993–2017) ===
In 1991, he co-produced, directed and acted in the film Ajagajantara. The film costarred Anjana and Srilekha and had music composed by Hamsalekha with the lyrics written by two of his proteges, Upendra and V. Manohar. The comedy-drama film met with commercial success and the same screenplay was adapted in the 1997 released Hindi film Judaai, starring Anil Kapoor, Sridevi and Urmila Matondkar.

After this, barring few films, many films directed, produced or acted by him were commercial failures. In the 1990s, he worked with many popular directors such as H. R. Bhargava, Om Sai Prakash, P. H. Vishwanath, B. Ramamurthy, T. S. Nagabharana and Upendra. In 1993, he acted as himself in the horror-thriller film Shhh directed by Upendra which was a success in the box office.

In 1995, he acted and directed the film Hendthi Endare Heegirabeku alongside Akshata which was moderately successful. His subsequent films such as Baduku Jataka Bandi (1997), Hello Yama (1998), Chor Guru Chandal Sishya (1998), Rambhe Urvashi Menake (1999) and Maava Maava Maduve Mado (2000) failed to impress the box office. His next directorial Meese Hottha Gandasige Demandappo Demandu (1999) based on the popular song line of his previous hit Avale Nanna Hendthi was a failure as well. In 2004, he starred in three films which included Aaha Nanna Thangi Maduve in his direction.

In 2007, he directed and acted in the film Appacchi which became his last directorial until his death in 2018. Later he acted in couple of films in supporting roles such as 12AM Madhyarathri (2012) along with his son Abhimanyu.

Kashinath made a comeback in 2016 through Prashant Raj's Zoom starring Ganesh by playing a key supporting role. This was followed up by his acting as one of the jail inmates in Dwarakish Chitra's 50th project Chowka in 2017.

He featured in the multistarrer Chowka, which was well received. His final onscreen appearance in Olu Muniswamy was released on 25 May 2018.

He also gifted many new artists to Kannada film industry. Some of them are actor-director Upendra, director Murali Mohan and music director V. Manohar.

== Filmography ==
=== As actor ===
Year	Film	Role	Notes
1982	Amara Madhura Prema		
1984	Anubhava	Ramesh	Also director
1987	Anaamika		Also director
1988	Avale Nanna Hendthi	Vishwanath	
1988	Mithileya Seetheyaru	Himself	
1989	Anantana Avantara	Ananthu	Also director
1989	Adrushta Rekhe		
1989	Thayigobba Tharle Maga		
1989	Avane Nanna Ganda	Balu	
1989	Preyasi Preethisu		
1989	Love Maadi Nodu	Mangalooru Manjunath	
1989	Manmatha Raja	Manmatha Raja	
1989	Sura Sundaranga	Purushotthama	
1989	Singari Bangari		
1990	Kaliyuga Krishna		
1990	Poli Kitti		Dual role
1990	Chapala Chennigaraya	Madan Gopal	
1990	Kempu Surya		
1991	Ajagajantara		Also director
1991	Nakkala Rajakumari		Guest appearance
1992	Athi Madura Anuraga		
1993	Love Training		
1993	Aatanka		
1993	Shhh!	Kashinath	
1995	Hendathi Endare Heegirabeku		Also director
1996	Bangarada Mane		Special appearance
1997	Baduku Jatakabandi		
1998	Hello Yama	Suri	
1998	Chorguru Chandala Sishya		
1999	Rambhe Urvashi Menake		
1999	Meese Hotta Gandasige Demandappu Demandu		Also director
2000	Sundara Neenu Sundari Naanu	Sundar	
2000	Mava Mava Maduve Mado	Gopal	
2001	Jackpot	Anand	Telugu film; also director
2004	Kachaguli		
2004	Naari Munidare Gandu Parari		
2004	Aha Nanna Tangi Maduve		Also director
2004	Super Aliya	Ganesh / Vijay	Dual role
2005	3Ka (Moorkha)		
2006	Bitti Thaali Gatti Mela		
2007	Appachchi	Narasimha	Also director
2012	12AM Madhyarathri	Professor	
2016	Zoom	Dr. Dhoomakethu	
2017	Chowka	Vishwanath	SIIMA Award for Best Actor in a Supporting Role (Male) - Kannada
2018	Ol Muniswamy	Muniswamy	

=== As director, writer and producer ===
Year	Film	Credited as				Notes
Year	Film	Director	Writer	Producer	Music director	Notes
1976	Aparoopada Athithigalu	Yes				
1978	Aparichita	Yes	Yes	Yes		
1981	Be-Shaque	Yes	Yes			Hindi remake of Aparichita
1984	Anubhava	Yes	Yes	Presenter		
1986	Anubhav	Yes	Yes			Hindi remake of Anubhava
1987	Anaamika	Yes	Yes	Yes		
1989	Anantana Avantara	Yes	Yes	Yes		
1991	Ajagajantara	Yes	Screenplay	Yes		
1995	Hendathi Endare Heegirabeku	Yes	Lyrics	Yes	Yes	
1999	Meese Hotta Gandasige Demandappu Demandu	Yes	Story			Also playback singer
2001	Jackpot	Yes	Yes		Yes	Telugu film
2004	Aha Nanna Tangi Maduve	Yes	Yes			
2007	Appachchi	Yes	Screenplay			
2012	12AM Madhyarathri			Executive		

== Death ==
Kashinath was diagnosed with Hodgkin's lymphoma in mid 2017. He was admitted to the Sri Shankara Cancer Hospital in Bengaluru on 16 January 2018. He died at 7:45 a.m (IST) on 18 January from cardiac arrest.
