= Chandrika Gururaj =

Indian playback singer

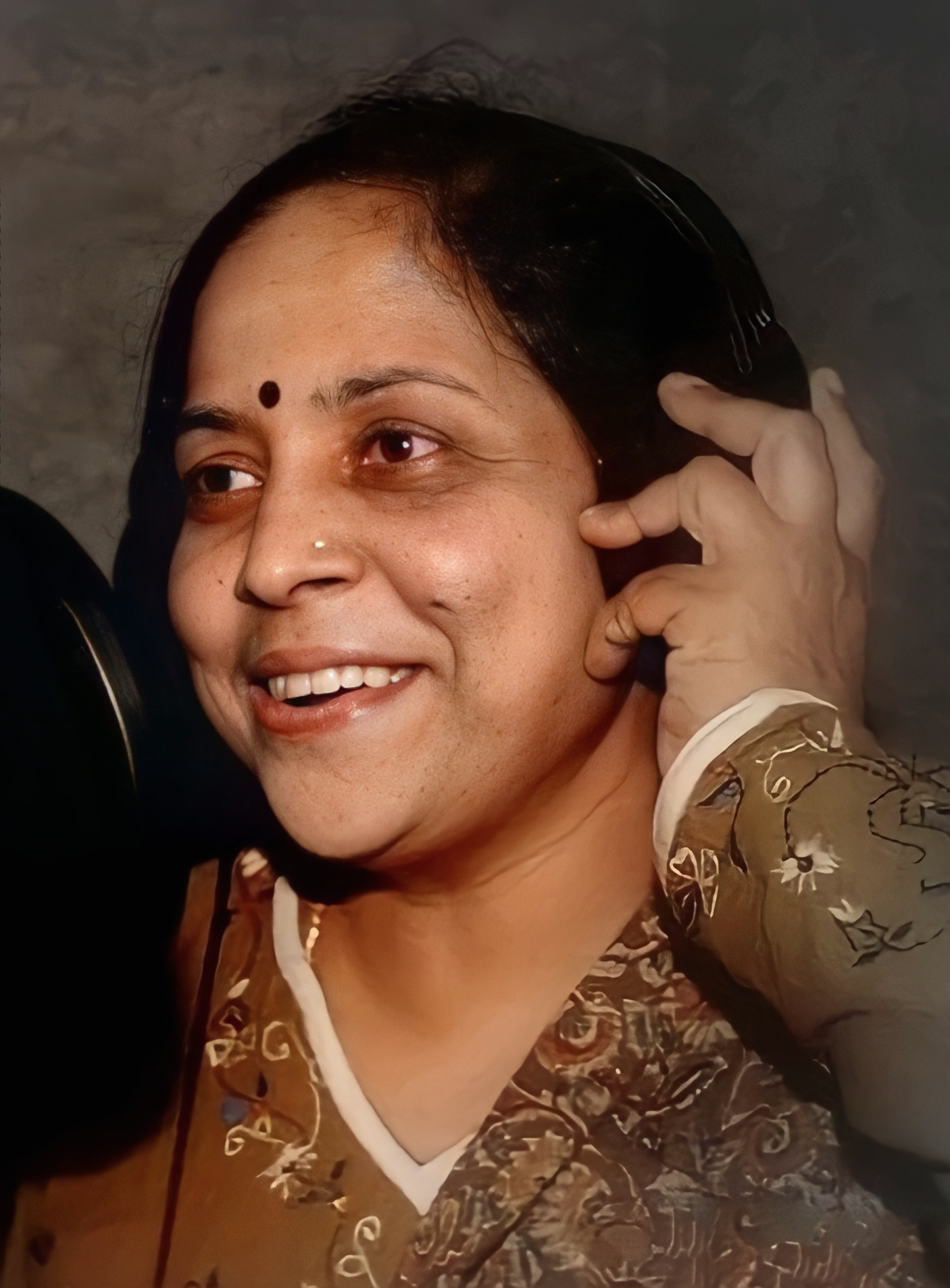
- Born: 4 October 1959 (age 66); Tumkur, Mysore state (now Karnataka), India
- Education: University of Mysore
- Occupations: Singer; performer
- Years active: 1989 - present
- Spouse: Gururaja
- Children: 1
- Awards: Karnataka State Film Award for Best Female Playback Singer
- Musical career
- Genres: Filmi; Folk; Classical; Bhajan; Ghazal
- Instrument: Vocals

Chandrika Gururaj (born 4 October 1959), is an Indian playback singer, known for her works in Kannada. Apart from film songs, she has also recorded numerous devotional, bhaavageethe and folk songs. For her song "O Priyatama" in the movie Urvashi, Chandrika won the Karnataka State Film Award for Best Female Playback Singer in 1994. Karnataka Government honoured her with the Karnataka Rajyotsava Award for her contribution to music, in 2010.

== Personal life ==
Chandrika was born on 4 October 1959 in Tumkur to Rangarao and Lalithamma. She graduated in sociology from the University of Mysore. She worked as a lecturer at Tumkur College for a brief period.

Chandrika married Gururaja. The couple have a daughter.

== Career ==
Chandrika was first noticed by actor Shankar Nag in a program, who later introduced her to composer Hamsalekha. Hamsalekha gave her, her first song "Kadalige Ondu Kone Ide", in the movie Indrajith, a duet with singer S. P. Balasubrahmanyam. Then she went on to record many film songs with S. P. Balasubrahmanyam, K. J. Yesudas, Mano, P. Jayachandran, L. N. Shastry, Rajesh Krishnan, Ramesh Chandra, and other singers.

She has worked with many composers, including Hamsalekha, V. Manohar, Ilayaraja, Rajan–Nagendra, Upendra Kumar, Raj–Koti, Sadhu Kokila, Rajesh Ramnath, Jayashree Aravind, and others.

She has recorded more than 100 film songs and more than 1000 non-film songs.

Some of her notable songs include "Prema Baraha Koti Taraha", "Ee Jogada Jalapatha", "Thattona Thattona", "Mamarake E Kogileya", "Ba Baro O Geleya", "Chaitrada Premanjaliya", "Avannalli Ivalilli", "Sangama Sangama", "O Bandhuve", "Eniddarenu Hennada Balika", "Nenapugala Angaladi", and "Hogabeda Hudugi".

She was one of the jury members in the 2016 Karnataka state film award committee. She is active in performing on stages across the country.

== Awards ==
- 2015 - Kempegowda Award by BBMP
- 2010 - Karnataka Rajyotsava Award
- 1995 - Karnataka State Film Award for Best Female Playback Singer
