= Latha Hamsalekha =

Indian playback singer

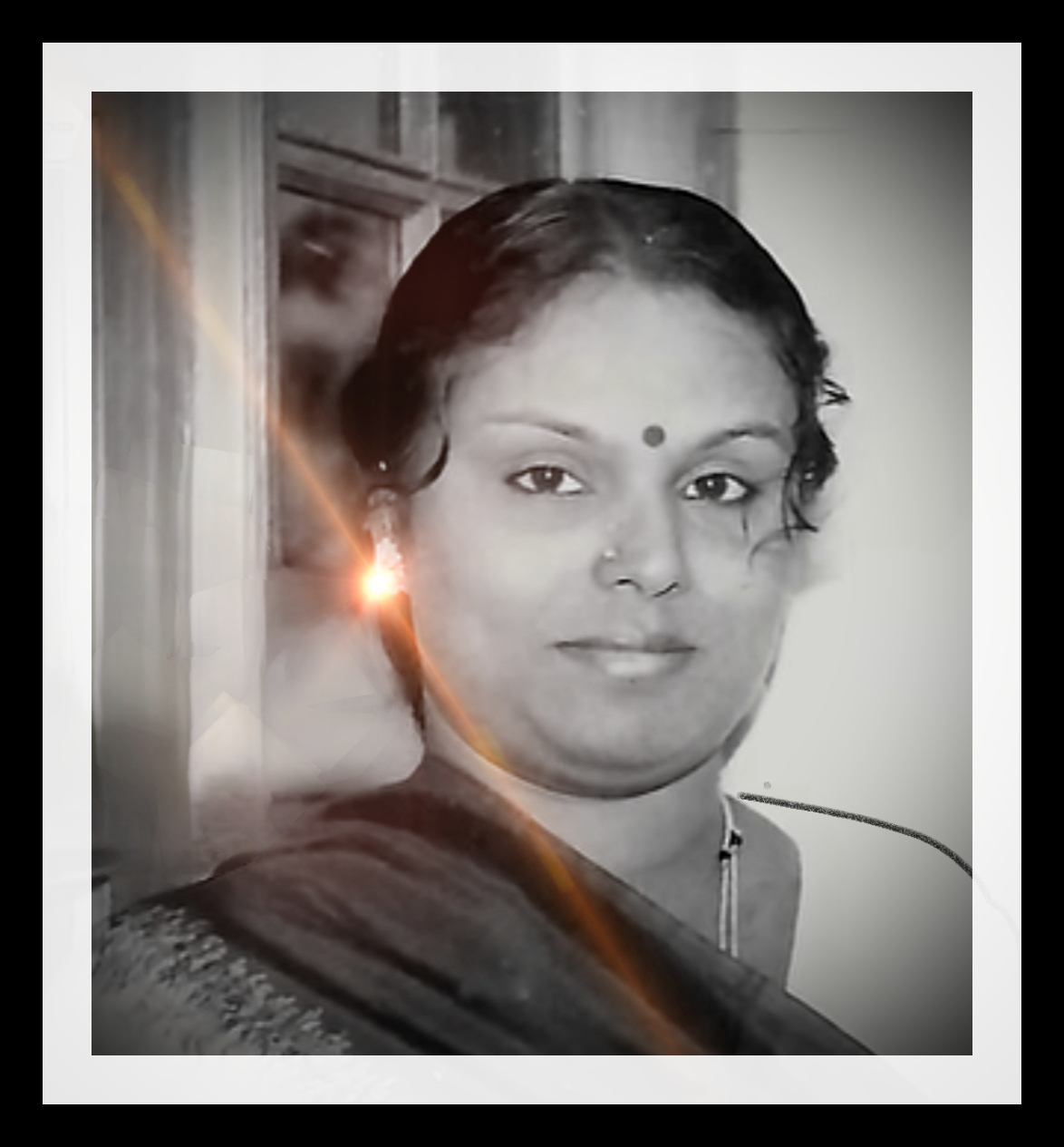

Background information
- Born: 12 December 1957 (age 68); Basavanagudi, Bangalore, Mysore state (now Karnataka)
- Occupations: Singer; performer
- Musical career
- Genres: Filmi; Folk; Bhajan
- Instruments: Vocals
- Labels: Independent Artist
- Awards: Karnataka State Film Award for Best Female Playback Singer

Latha, commonly known as Latha Hamsalekha, is an Indian playback singer in Kannada. She is married to composer Hamsalekha. For her song Aa Arunodaya Chanda in the movie Arunodaya, Latha was awarded the Karnataka State Film Award for Best Female Playback Singer in 1999–2000.

== Personal life ==
Latha was born in Bangalore to Mitrananda Kumar and Sharada. She married Hamsalekha and they have a son and two daughters.

== Career ==
Latha first became an orchestra singer in ‛Gaana Sharada’ troupe, owned by Hamsalekha's elder brother G. Balakrishna. Then started her career as playback singer through the hit song Nodamma Hudugi in the movie Premaloka in 1987. Most of her songs are recorded by Hamsalekha. Some of her hit songs including "Hasiru Gajina Balegale" (Avane Nanna Ganda), "Kaveri Theeradalli Mungarige" (Chaitrada Premanjali), "Akaradalli Gulabi Rangide" (Anjada Gandu), "Collegegu Thanks" (Joot) and many.

== Awards ==
- 2023 - Bidari cultural Award by Bidar District administration for lifetime achievement
- 2017 - Dr. Rajkumar Award by Raghavendra Chitravani Institution
- 1999-2000 - Karnataka State Film Award for Best Female Playback Singer - Aa Arunodaya Chanda (Arunodaya)
