= Hamsalekha =

Indian film composer and songwriter (born 1951)

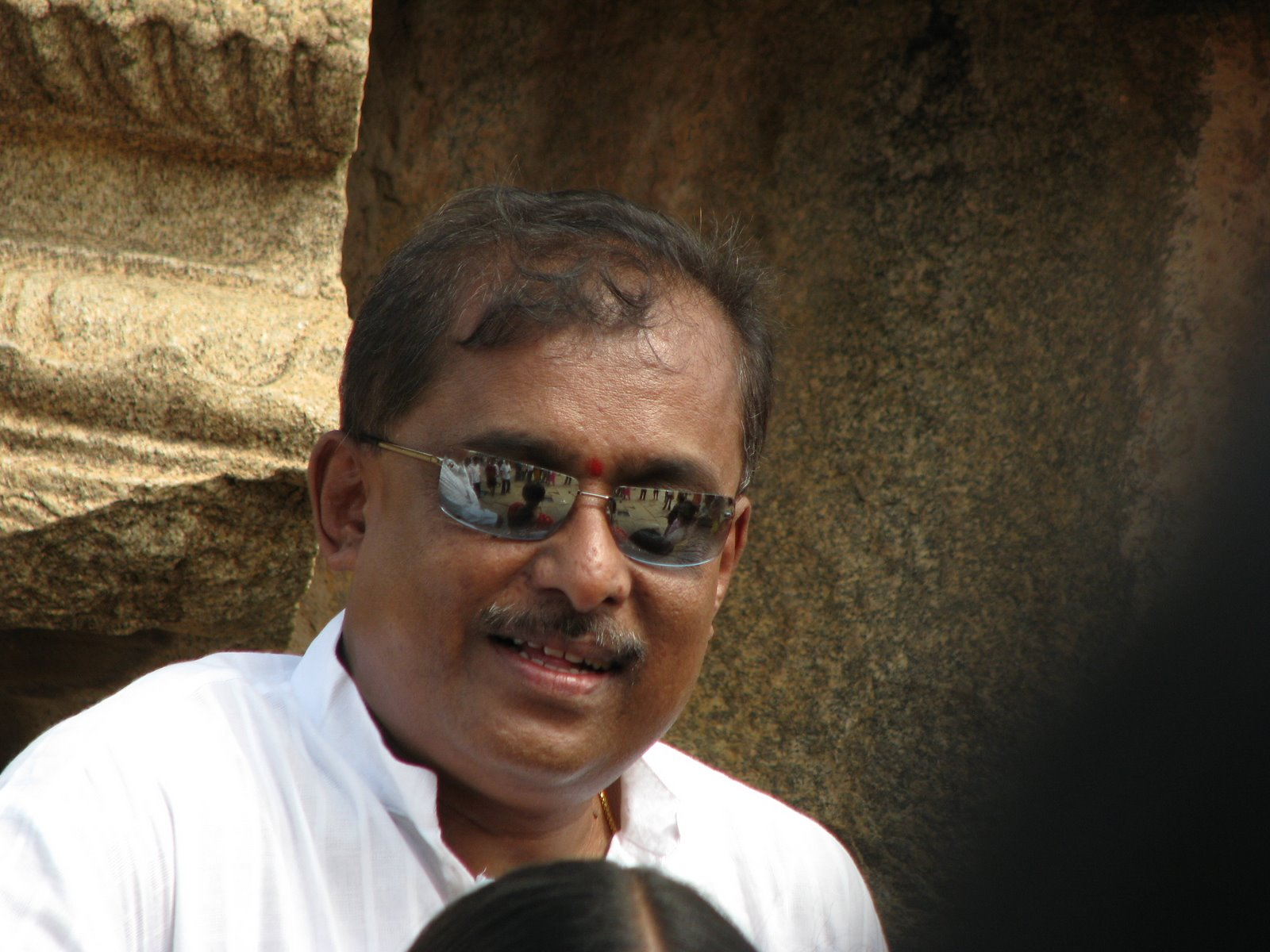

Background information
- Born: Gangaraju; June 23, 1951 (age 75); Bengaluru, Karnataka, India
- Origin: Mandya, Karnataka, India
- Genres: Film score Soundtrack; Theatre; World music
- Occupations: Music Composer, Lyricist, Screenwriter, Dialogue writer
- Instruments: Keyboards, vocals, guitar, piano, harmonium, percussion, other
- Years active: 1981–present
- Website: www.hamsalekhadesi.com

Gangaraju (born June 23, 1951), professionally known as Hamsalekha, is an Indian film composer and songwriter who works in South Indian cinema, predominantly in the Kannada film industry since the late 1980s. He is also a screenplay writer, dialogue writer, instrumentalist and conductor, having composed and written over 500 albums.

Hamsalekha has won one National Film Award, six Filmfare Awards in the Best Music Director Category, seven Karnataka State Film Awards - four for music direction and three for lyrics - and is a recipient of an honorary doctorate from Bangalore University. His collaboration with V. Ravichandran resulted in producing blockbuster soundtracks in mainstream Kannada cinema.

== Early career ==
Hamsalekha was born as Gangaraju in 1951, to K. H. Govindaraju and Rajamma in Tulasikatte, near Akkipete in Bangalore. After his studies, he was employed in his father's printing press and subsequently joined his brother Balakrishna's orchestra group. Lavani Neelakantappa his teacher modified his name as "Hamsalekha". He was introduced into feature films by director M. N. Prasad, who provided an opportunity to write a song for the film Triveni (1973). The song "Neena Bhagavantha" was his first release picturised on actor Udaykumar. His debut film as a musician was the 1981 unreleased film Rahuchandra. Officially, his cinema career started as a dialogue and lyric writer for the film Naanu Nanna Hendthi (1985). Later his popularity peaked only after his association with actor-director Ravichandran. Premaloka, released in 1987.

== Personal life ==
Hamsalekha is married to Latha Hamsalekha who was a playback singer in the 1990s. The couple have a son named Alankar and two daughters named Tejaswini and Nandini. Alankar is associated with films as an actor and musician. Few of his released and unreleased movies are Sugghi, Tapori and Roja. Tejaswini is associated with film direction, acting and directing plays, she has done her master's in theater from Bangalore University and directed many plays in association with her father Hamsalekha. Nandini began her playback singing career with the film Sixer (2006).

== Notable works ==
After working on Premaloka, Hamsalekha became one of the most prolific music directors in Kannada film, with many hits. He made occasional use of many genres of music, including Western, pop, rock, hip hop, Indian classical, folk, ghazals, Sufi, and item songs. "Chandakinta Chanda", a ghazal he composed for the film Sparsha, was a major hit. He has created songs ranging from the philosophical ("Le Le Marula" in Shaapa, a film whose story he wrote himself) to the naughty ("Kaayi Kaayi Nuggekaayi Mahimege" in Halli Maestru), the patriotic ("Huttidhare Kannada Nadalli Hutta Bekku" in Rajkumar's Aakasmika, a song which has become an unofficial anthem of Karnataka) and love songs ("Ele Hombisile..." in Halunda Tavaru). He composed the background score for one movie using a single instrument and made the music for Kona Eedaite with no instruments at all. His music in the film Hagalu Vesha had a rustic and folk feel without the use of synthetic sounds. Shanti, a film by Baraguru Ramachandrappa with music by Hamsalekha, was mentioned in the Guinness Book of Records as the film with only one character. He made his an onscreen appearance in Mukhaputa. His music in the 2010 movie Naanu Nanna Kanasu was appreciated by critics as well as audiences. He also composed for the National Award-winning movie Puttakkana Highway in 2011.

The melodic structure of his songs demand considerable vocal virtuosity, and have found expressive platform amongst some of India's respected vocalists and playback singers, such as Dr. Rajkumar, P. B. Sreenivas, S. Janaki, Vani Jairam, P. Susheela, K. J. Yesudas, S. P. Balasubrahmanyam, Mano, Swarnalatha, K. S. Chithra, Sujatha Mohan, Kavita Krishnamurthy, Anuradha Paudwal, Sadhana Sargam, B. R. Chaya, Manjula Gururaj, Chandrika Gururaj, L. N. Shastry, Rajesh Krishnan, Ramesh Chandra, Hemanth Kumar, Sangeetha Katti, Rathnamala Prakash, Nanditha, Sowmya Raoh, B. Jayashree, Sonu Nigam, Hariharan, Udit Narayan, Kumar Sanu and Shreya Ghoshal with majority of the songs recorded by S. P. Balasubrahmanyam, S. Janaki and K. S. Chithra. He recorded some of the rare and distinct voices like M. Balamuralikrishna for a song in Muthina Haara (1990), C. Ashwath for Hoovu Hannu (1993) and Pankaj Udhas for Sparsha (2001).

== Non-film music ==
Hamsalekha has written music for stage plays and private albums.

== Discography ==
=== As a playback singer ===
- Nigooda Rahasya (1990) - "Enappa Yajmana"

=== Telugu films ===
- 1988: Avalu
- 1989: Muthyamantha Muddu
- 1990: Prema Yuddham
- 1990: Kaliyuga Abhimanyudu
- 1991: Shanti Kranti
- 1993: Ankuram
- 1997: Omkaram
- 1999: A. K. 47
- 2001: Sri Manjunatha

=== Tamil films ===
- 1987: Paruva Ragam
- 1988: Jaadikketha Moodi
- 1988: Kodi Parakuthu
- 1988: Puthiya Vaanam
- 1989: Idhu Unga Kudumbam
- 1990: Velai Kidaichuduchu
- 1991: Nattukku Oru Nallavan
- 1991: Captain Magal

=== Hindi film ===
- 1991: Shanti Kranti

== Filmography ==
Hamsalekha has written stories, screenplays, dialogues, and lyrics for several movies.

=== Story ===
- Avane Nanna Ganda (1989)
- Gandharva (1993)
- Shaapa (2001)

=== Screenplay ===
- Nimmajji (1989)
- Gandharva (1993)

=== Dialogues ===
- Premaloka (1987)
- Ranadheera (1988)
- Ranaranga (1988)
- Avane Nanna Ganda (1989)
- Yuga Purusha (1989)
- Halli Meshtru (1992)
- Gandharva (1993)

=== Lyrics ===
- Triveni (1972)
- Nammoora Basvi (1983)
- Aase (1987)
- Mathru Vathsalya (1988)
- Hongkongnalli Agent Amar (1989)
- Krishna Nee Kunidaga (1989)
- Nanagoo Hendthi Beku (1991)
- Ranachandi (1991)
- Midida Shruthi (1992)
- Pruthviraj (1992)
- Abhijith (1993)
- Bhavya Bharatha (1993)
- Muddina Maava (1993)
- Navibbaru Namagibbaru (1993)
- Odahuttidavaru (1994)
- Thooguve Krishnana (1994)
- Hello Sister (1995)
- Mana Midiyithu (1995)
- Putmalli (1995)
- Savya Sachi (1995)
- Kanasalu Neene Manasalu Neene (1998)
- Premotsava (1999)
- Amma Nagamma (2001)
- Vande Matharam (2001)
- Appu (2002)
- Abhi (2003)
- Manasella Neene (2003)
- Love (2004)
- Pandava (2004)
- Veera Kannadiga (2004)
- Hai Chinnu (2005)
- Ajay (2006)
- Bharathi (2006)
- Amrutha Vaani (2007)
- Arasu (2007)
- PUC (2008)
- Vamshi (2008)
- Zindagi (2008)
- Eshtu Nagthi Nagu (2009)
- Preethi Nee Heegeke (2010)
- Hare Rama Hare Krishna (2011)
- Olave Mandara (2011)
- Aarakshaka (2012)
- Samsaradalli Golmal (2012)
- Chithramandiradalli (2013)
- Crazy Star (2014)

== Mentoring ==
Hamsalekha has mentored several notable singers, music directors, lyricist, directors in Kannada movie industry.

- Rajesh Krishnan, Indian Playback Singer
- Chetan Sosca, Playback Singer
- Hemanth Kumar, Playback Singer
- K. Kalyan, Music composer and lyricist
- Nanditha (singer), Playback Singer
- Anoop Seelin, Music Composer
- V. Harikrishna, Music composer
- V. Manohar, Music composer, lyricist and director
- V. Sridhar, Music composer
- L. N. Shastry, singer, composer
- V. Nagendra Prasad, lyricist, composer
- Suma Shastry, singer
- Anuradha Bhat, singer
- Indu Nagaraj, singer

== Desi Music Trust ==
Hamsalekha laid the foundation stone for Desi Music University on the day of Kannada Rajyotsava on 1 November 2010. The university will be built with ₹ 1.20 billion on 50 acres (200,000 m^{2}) of land in Mudhigere village near Channapatna in Karnataka. The Dravidian University of Andhra Pradesh has given recognition to this Hamsalekha College of Performing Arts.

== Awards ==
Hamsalekha has received many awards over the past three decades.

National Film Awards:

- 1995 - National Film Award for Best Music Direction - Film: Sangeetha Sagara Ganayogi Panchakshara Gavai

Honorary doctorate: He has been conferred the honorary doctorate award by the Bengaluru University in the year 2014 for his meritorious service to the Indian Music Industry.

Filmfare Awards South:

- 2005 - Filmfare Award for Best Music Director (Kannada) - Film: Nenapirali
- 2000 - Filmfare Award for Best Music Director (Kannada) - Film: Preethse
- 1998 - Filmfare Award for Best Music Director (Kannada) - Film: Yaare Neenu Cheluve
- 1994 - Filmfare Award for Best Music Director (Kannada) - Film: Halunda Tavaru
- 1993 - Filmfare Award for Best Music Director (Kannada) - film: Aakasmika
- 1991 - Filmfare Award for Best Music Director (Kannada) - Film: Ramachaari

Karnataka State Film Awards:

For music direction

- 2005 - Nenapirali
- 1995 - Sangeetha Sagara Ganayogi Panchakshara Gavai
- 1994 - Halunda Tavaru

For lyrics

- 2001 - Sri Manjunatha
- 1994 - Haalunda Thavaru

Other awards:

- 2012 - Dr. Rajkumar Lifetime Achievement Award from Karnataka State Government
- 2005 - Rajyostava Award (Suvarna Rajyostava)
- 2020 - S. Janaki National Award
- 2004 - Hello Gandhinagara Award Best Music Director
- 2005 - Kempegowda Prashasti
- 2005 - Sunfeast Udaya film award for the best lyrics - Nenapirali
