= K. Sivasankar =

Indian dance choreographer (1948–2021)

K. Sivashankar
- Born: 7 December 1948; Chennai, Tamil Nadu, Dominion of India
- Died: 28 November 2021 (aged 72); Hyderabad, Telangana, India
- Occupations: Choreographer, actor
- Years active: 1975–2021
- Spouse: Suganya
- Children: 2
- Honours: Kalaimamani 2020

K. Sivashankar (7 December 1948 – 28 November 2021) was an Indian dance choreographer, who worked in more than 10 languages but majorly with South Indian films, including Telugu and Tamil films.

== Early life ==
Shivashankar was born in Govindappa Naicken Street, Parrys, Chennai, on 7 December 1948, to Kalyana Sundaram and Komala Amal. His father was wholesale fruit vendor in Kothawal Chavadi. His backbone was fractured at a very young age in an accident for which and recovered around 8 years of age under the extensive care of his aunts. He was initially home schooled and later studied in Hindu Theological Higher Secondary School, Sowcarpet. He attributed his feminine mannerism to his growing up without much contact with the outside world and where women in family were taking care of him mostly. His father was highly skilled with immense knowledge in Carnatic music & Astrology, but very strict with his children. While his father attended carnatic music festival, Sivasankar was asked to go for drama & dance festivals to represent him. This inspired him to learn dance. He learnt basics in dance from Natraj & Sakunthala, Mylapore. Later, he joined as assistant to dance master Saleem in 1974.

== Career ==
Having worked on over 800 feature films, Sivasankar has won the Tamil Nadu State Film Award for Best Choreographer for Poove Unakkaga (1996), Vishwa Thulasi (2003), Varalaru (2006) and Uliyin Osai (2008). Sivasankar won the National Film Award for Best Choreography for his work in S. S. Rajamouli's historical drama Magadheera (2008), with the jury noting he was rewarded "for breath taking energy and innovation" in the song "Dheera Dheera Dheera". His experience at the official ceremony was reported in the media after he was critical of the delay in allowing him into the venue. In 2003, his super-fast choreography of super hit song Manmadha Raasa for Thiruda Thirudi film was widely talked about. In 2003, he was awarded an honorary doctorate from New International Christian University, Bangalore for his services to dance.

Sivasankar has also appeared in acting roles, notably starring as Ajith Kumar's dance instructor in K. S. Ravikumar's Varalaru (2006). The choreographer was asked to design the dance sequences but also the action sequences and the overall body language of Ajith, to depict him in a feminine way. He later portrayed the role of a Christian missionary in Bala's period drama Paradesi (2013), who works to convert the religion of naive tea workers.

== Death ==
Sivasankar died from COVID-19 at a private hospital in Hyderabad on 28 November 2021, at the age of 72.

== Filmography ==
=== As choreographer ===
Year	Film	Language	Notes
1975	Paattum Bharathamum	Tamil	Debut as Assistant
1977	Kavikkuyil	Tamil	
1979	Bottu Kanuka	Telugu	
1980	Kuruvikoodu	Tamil	Debut as Dance Master
1980	Buchi Babu	Telugu	
1980	Bhola Shankarudu	Telugu	
1982	Yuvaraju	Telugu	
1982	Swayamvaram	Telugu	
1983	Saattai Illatha Pambaram	Tamil	
1983	Mann Vasanai	Tamil	
1983	Khaidi	Telugu	
1984	Bobbili Brahmanna	Telugu	
1984	Palnati Puli	Telugu	
1984	Illalu Priyuralu	Telugu	
1984	Adigo Alladigo	Telugu	
1985	Puli	Telugu	
1985	Muddula Chellelu	Telugu	
1985	Sri Katha Leelalu	Telugu	
1985	Bhale Thammudu	Telugu	
1985	Raktha Sindhuram	Telugu	
1985	Dampatyam	Telugu	
1985	Maruthi Mahime	Kannada	
1985	Aatmabalam	Telugu	
1985	Palnati Simham	Telugu	
1985	Chiranjeevi	Telugu	
1985	Mayalaadi	Telugu	
1985	Bangaru Chilaka	Telugu	
1985	Mantradandam	Telugu	
1986	Kashmora	Telugu	
1986	Sravana Sandhya	Telugu	
1986	Aakrandana	Telugu	
1986	Bettada Thayi	Kannada	
1986	Mouna Geethe	Kannada	
1986	Samsarada Guttu	Kannada	
1986	Usha	Kannada	
1986	Challani Ramayya Chakkani Seethamma	Telugu	
1986	Aranyakanda	Telugu	
1986	Sakkanodu	Telugu	
1986	Pavitra	Telugu	
1986	Sravana Meghalu	Telugu	
1986	Veta	Telugu	
1986	Pasuputhadu	Telugu	
1986	Desoddarakudu	Telugu	
1986	Chadastapu Mogudu	Telugu	
1986	Ukku Manishi	Telugu	
1987	Marana Sasanam	Telugu	
1987	Rowdy Babai	Telugu	
1987	Vijetha Vikram	Telugu	
1987	Sri Kanaka Mahalakshmi Recording Dance Troupe	Telugu	
1987	Lorry Driver	Kannada	
1987	Thayi	Kannada	
1987	Hrudaya Pallavi	Kannada	
1987	Bhargava Ramudu	Telugu	
1987	Gowthami	Telugu	
1987	Punnami Chandrudu	Telugu	
1987	Saradambha	Telugu	
1987	Bhale Mogudu	Telugu	
1987	Krishna Leela	Telugu	
1987	Gundammagari Krishnulu	Telugu	
1987	Muddu Bidda	Telugu	
1987	Raga Leela	Telugu	
1988	Rowdy No. 1	Telugu	
1988	Doragariki Intlo Dongodu	Telugu	
1988	Pelli Chesi Choodu	Telugu	
1988	Mugguru Kodukulu	Telugu	
1988	Pruthvi Raj	Telugu	
1988	Thodallullu	Telugu	
1988	Nanna Aavesha	Kannada	
1988	Coolie	Telugu	
1988	Rakthabhishekam	Telugu	
1988	Donga Pelli	Telugu	
1988	Jhansi Rani	Telugu	
1988	Agni Keratalu	Telugu	
1988	Bharya Bhartala Bagotham	Telugu	
1988	Station Master	Telugu	
1988	August 15 Raatri	Telugu	
1988	Maa Inti Maharaju	Telugu	
1989	Aakhari Kshanam	Telugu	
1989	Swathi Chinukulu	Telugu	
1989	Krishna Gari Abbayi	Telugu	
1989	Aarthanandam	Telugu	
1989	Bhale Dampathulu	Telugu	
1989	Sakshi	Telugu	
1989	Love Maadi Nodu	Kannada	
1989	Thayigooba Tharle Maga	Kannada	
1989	Dorikithe Dongalu	Telugu	
1989	Soggadi Kapuram	Telugu	
1989	Ashoka Chakravarthy	Telugu	
1989	Swara Kalpana	Telugu	
1989	Muthyamantha Muddu	Telugu	
1989	Sarvabhoumudu	Telugu	
1989	Mamathala Kovela	Telugu	
1989	Goonda Rajyam	Telugu	
1989	Sumangali	Telugu	
1989	Yamapasam	Telugu	
1990	Manaivi Oru Manickam	Tamil	
1990	Golmaal Radhakrishna	Kannada	
1990	Policena Hendthi	Kannada	
1990	Challenge Gopalakrishna	Kannada	
1990	Swarna Samsara	Kannada	
1990	Nammoora Hammeera	Kannada	
1990	Aavesha	Kannada	
1990	Police Bharya	Telugu	
1990	Justice Rudramma Devi	Telugu	
1990	Mama Alludu	Telugu	
1990	Bujjigaddi Babai	Telugu	
1990	Udhyamam	Telugu	
1990	Kokila	Telugu	
1990	Neti Dowrjanyam	Telugu	
1990	Yuvabharatham	Telugu	
1990	Rao Gari Intlo Rowdy	Telugu	
1990	Inspector Rudra	Telugu	
1991	Attintlo Adde Mogudu	Telugu	
1991	Vichitra Prema	Telugu	
1991	Sri Saila Bharamarambika Katakshamu	Telugu	
1991	Gruha Pravesha	Kannada	
1991	Ibbaru Hendira Muddina Police	Kannada	
1991	Bhairavi	Kannada	
1991	Kollur Kala	Kannada	
1991	Golmaal Part 2	Kannada	
1991	Vidhata	Telugu	
1991	Pandirimancham	Telugu	
1991	Intlo Pili Veedhilo Puli	Telugu	
1991	Maneli lli Beedeeli Huli	Kannada	
1991	Anatha Rakshaka	Kannada	
1991	Readymade Ganda	Kannada	
1991	Kitturina Huli	Kannada	
1991	Prema Entha Madhuram	Telugu	
1991	Ganga	Telugu	
1991	Agni Nakshatram	Telugu	
1992	Gowramma	Telugu	
1992	Collector Gari Abbai	Telugu	
1992	Pelli Neeku Shubham Naaku	Telugu	
1992	Karuninchina Kanakala Durga	Telugu	
1992	Roshagara	Kannada	
1992	Aathma Bandhana	Kannada	
1992	Gharshane	Kannada	
1992	Nagaradalli Nayakaru	Kannada	
1992	Samsarala Mechanic	Telugu	
1992	Joker Mama Super Alludu	Telugu	
1992	Amara Prema	Kannada	
1992	Sambhavi	Kannada	
1992	Hendtheere Hushar	Kannada	
1992	Solillada Saradara	Kannada	
1992	Nanna Thangi	Kannada	
1992	Sindhoora Thilaka	Kannada	
1992	Moratodu Naa Mogudu	Telugu	
1992	Pellam Chatu Mogudu	Telugu	
1992	Chitram Bhalare Vichitram	Telugu	
1992	Seethapathi Chalo Tirupathi	Telugu	
1992	Chakravyuham	Telugu	
1993	Inspector Jhansi		
1993	Rowdy Gari Teacher		
1993	Attaku Koduku Mamaku Alludu		
1993	Ratha Saradhi		
1993	Kondapalli Raja		
1993	Pellama Majaka		
1993	Naga Jyothi		
1993	Anna Vadina		
1993	Kirayi Gunda		
1993	Donga Alludu		
1993	Marupadiyum	Tamil	
1994	En Aasai Machan	Tamil	
1994	Parugo Parugu	Telugu	
1994	Bhairava Dweepam	Telugu	
1994	Aame	Telugu	
1994	Bangaru Mogudu	Telugu	
1994	Palleturi Mogudu	Telugu	
1994	M. Dharmaraju M.A.	Telugu	
1994	Bhale Mavayya	Telugu	
1994	Doragariki Donga Pellam	Telugu	
1995	Aalu Magalu	Telugu	
1995	Badili	Telugu	
1995	Ammaleni Puttinillu	Telugu	
1995	Thumbida Mane	Kannada	
1995	Gadibidi Aliya	Kannada	
1995	Zakhmi Sipahi	Hindi	
1995	Ammoru	Telugu	
1995	Shubha Lagna	Kannada	
1995	Thaliya Sowbhagya	Kannada	
1995	Hello Sister	Kannada	
1995	Poove Unakkaga	Tamil	
1996	Adithya	Kannada	
1996	Sowbhagya Devathe	Kannada	
1996	Pellala Rajyam	Telugu	
1996	Amma Nagamma	Telugu	
1996	Maa Inti Aadapaduchu	Telugu	
1996	Amma Nanna Kavali	Telugu	
1997	Chelikadu	Telugu	
1997	Surya Puthrulu	Telugu	
1997	Hitler	Telugu	
1997	Prema Geethe	Kannada	
1997	Agni I. P. S	Kannada	
1997	Shreemathi	Kannada	
1997	Ee Hrudaya Nindagi	Kannada	
1997	Nesam	Tamil	
1997	Suryavamsam	Tamil	
1998	Suswagatham	Telugu	
1998	Dil Se..	Hindi	
1998	Jagadeeshwari	Kannada	
1998	Ninaithen Vandhai	Tamil	
1999	Thullatha Manamum Thullum	Tamil	
1999	Rajasthan	Tamil	
1999	Perianna	Tamil	
1999	Suyamvaram	Tamil	
2000	Vetri Kodi Kattu	Tamil	
2000	Ninne Premistha	Telugu	
2000	Ennavalle	Tamil	
2000	Naga Devathe	Kannada	
2000	Vaanavil	Tamil	
2001	Salute	Telugu	
2001	Jithendra	Kannada	
2001	Sri Manjunatha	Telugu / Kannada	
2002	Siva Rama Raju	Telugu	
2002	Kitty	Kannada	
2002	Samasthanam	Tamil	
2002	Sri Bannari Amman	Tamil	
2003	Thiruda Thirudi	Tamil	
2003	Vaseegara	Tamil	
2003	Mane Magalu	Kannada	
2003	Nanjundi	Kannada	
2003	Tiger Harischandra Prasad	Telugu	
2004	Lakshmi Narasimha	Telugu	
2004	Cheppave Chirugali	Telugu	
2004	Swamy	Telugu	
2004	Donga Dongadi	Telugu	
2004	Shwetha Naagu	Telugu	
2004	Shwetha Naagara	Kannada	
2004	Ramakrishna	Kannada	
2004	Rowdy Aliya	Kannada	
2004	Vishwa Thulasi	Tamil	
2005	Thirupaachi	Tamil	
2005	Sakha Sakhi	Kannada	
2005	Suntaragaali	Kannada	
2005	Allari Pidugu	Telugu	
2005	Pandem	Telugu	
2005	Okkade	Telugu	
2005	Andagadu	Telugu	
2005	Devi Abhayam	Telugu	
2005	Pellam Pichodu	Telugu	
2006	Seethakoka Chiluka	Telugu	
2006	Manasu Palike Mouna Raagam	Telugu	
2006	Pellaina Kothalo	Telugu	
2006	Manasundi Kaani	Telugu	
2006	My Autograph	Kannada	
2006	Gandugali Kumararama	Kannada	
2006	Thavarina Siri	Kannada	
2006	Varalaru	Tamil	
2007	Manohara	Telugu	
2007	Parodi	Kannada	
2007	Yamadonga	Telugu	
2008	Avatharudu	Telugu	
2008	Pandurangadu	Telugu	
2008	Andamaina Abbavam	Telugu	
2008	Uliyin Osai	Tamil	
2009	Arundhati	Telugu	
2009	Magadheera	Telugu	
2009	Yodha	Kannada	
2009	Bhagyada Balegaara	Kannada	
2009	Devaru Kotta Thangi	Kannada	
2009	Aa Okkadu	Telugu	
2009	Punnami Naagu	Telugu	
2009	Jaganmohini	Telugu	
2009	Mahatma	Telugu	
2010	Prathikaram	Telugu	
2010	Nagavalli	Telugu	
2010	Collector Gari Bharya	Telugu	
2010	Aayirathil Oruvan	Tamil	
2010	Kutti Pisasu	Tamil	
2010	Cara Majaka	Telugu	
2010	Bombat Car	Kannada	
2010	Appu and Pappu	Kannada	
2010	Hendtheer Darbar	Kannada	
2010	Preethiya Theru	Kannada	
2010	1977 Jarigindi Yemiti?	Telugu	
2010	Varudu	Telugu	
2010	Kalavar King	Telugu	
2011	Singam Puli	Tamil	
2011	Kote	Kannada	
2011	Rajanna	Telugu	
2011	Nagaram Nidrapotunna Vela	Telugu	
2011	Parama Veera Chakra	Telugu	
2012	Devaraya	Telugu	
2012	Shridi Sai	Telugu	
2012	Kalpana	Kannada	
2012	God Father	Kannada	
2012	Damarukam	Telugu	
2012	Nuvva Nena	Telugu	
2013	Masala	Telugu	
2013	Attarintiki Daredi	Telugu	
2014	Chandrakala	Telugu	
2014	Kochadaiiyaan	Tamil	
2014	Neenade Naa	Kannada	
2014	Agraja	Kannada	
2015	Lion	Telugu	
2015	Eli	Tamil	
2015	Baahubali: The Beginning	Telugu / Tamil	
2016	Nagabharanam	Telugu	
2017	Prematho Mee Karthik	Telugu	
2019	Nene Kedi No 1	Telugu	
2019	NTR: Kathanayakudu	Telugu	
2019	NTR: Mahanayakudu	Telugu	
2021	Maaligai	Tamil	Only dubbed version released
2022	Marutha	Tamil	
2022	Son of India	Telugu	
2022	Induvadana	Telugu	
2023	Raa Raa Penimitti	Telugu	

=== As actor ===
Year	Film	Role	Language	Notes
1991	Chitram Bhalare Vichitram	Dance master	Telugu	Special appearance in a song
1996	Poove Unakkaga	Himself	Tamil	Guest appearance
2000	James Pandu		Tamil	
2003	Popcorn		Tamil	
2003	Alai	Dance master	Tamil	
2004	Gomathi Nayagam	Himself	Tamil	
2006	Mercury Pookkal	Wedding guest	Tamil	Uncredited
2006	Varalaru	Shivashankar's master	Tamil	
2006	Manasu Palike Mouna Raagam	Priest	Telugu	
2007	Onbadhu Roobai Nottu	Dhandapani	Tamil	
2008	Nadigai	Himself	Tamil	Uncredited
2009	Ajantha		Kannada	Special appearance
2010	Kutti Pisasu / Cara Majaka / Bombat Car	Dance master	Tamil / Telugu / Kannada	
2011	Gurusamy	Himself	Tamil	
2012	Ajantha		Malayalam / Tamil	Special appearance
2012	Godfather		Kannada	
2012	Sudigadu	Himself	Telugu	
2013	Kanna Laddu Thinna Aasaiya	Sowmiya's father	Tamil	
2013	Paradesi	Parisutham	Tamil	
2013	Thillu Mullu	Dance master	Tamil	
2013	Potugadu	Vaidehi's dance master	Telugu	
2014	Enna Satham Indha Neram	Kidnapper	Tamil	
2014	Aranmanai	Devotional singer	Tamil	
2015	Adhibar	Tiger Kothandaraman	Tamil	
2015	Indru Netru Naalai	Jewelry store owner	Tamil	
2016	Arthanari	Ramasamy	Tamil	
2017	Engitta Modhathey		Tamil	
2017	Shivalinga	Annalakshmi's assistant	Tamil	
2017	Nene Raju Nene Mantri		Telugu	Special appearance in the song "Radhamma Radhamma"
2018	Thaanaa Serndha Koottam	Ondiveeran	Tamil	
2018	Ghajinikanth	Mohan's father	Tamil	
2018	Nadodi Kanavu		Tamil	
2018	Sarkar	Election commissioner	Tamil	
2019	Dhilluku Dhuddu 2	Viji's neighbour	Tamil	
2019	Akshara	Dance teacher	Telugu	
2019	N.T.R: Kathanayakudu	Vempati Chinna Satyam	Telugu	
2019	Ninu Veedani Needanu Nene	Priest	Telugu	
2019	Raju Gari Gadhi 3	Colony president	Telugu	
2020	Pachai Vilakku		Tamil	
2020	Biskoth	Old man	Tamil	
2021	Engada Iruthinga Ivvalavu Naala	Master	Tamil	
2021	Climax	Dance Master	Telugu	
2022	Idiot	Vijayasimha Reddy	Tamil	Posthumous release
2022	Hero	Dance master	Telugu	Posthumous release
2023	Bagheera	Officer	Tamil	Posthumous release
2023	Ellaam Mela Irukuravan Paathuppan	Ganapathy	Tamil	Posthumous release
2023	Nene Naa		Telugu	Posthumous release
2025	Virgin Boys		Telugu	Posthumous release

=== Television ===
Year	Title	Role	Language	Channel
2020	Naga Bhairavi	Shivudu	Telugu	Zee Telugu
2021	Jothi	Hakkim Bhai	Tamil	Sun TV
2021	No.1 Kodalu	Himself	Telugu	Zee Telugu

== Awards and honours ==
=== National Film Awards ===
- 2009: "Dheera Dheera Dheera" in Magadheera (for Best Choreography)

=== Tamil Nadu State Film Award for Best Choreographer ===
- 1996: Poove Unakkaga
- 2004: Vishwa Thulasi
- 2006: Varalaaru
- 2008: Uliyin Osai
