= Shiva Rajkumar filmography =

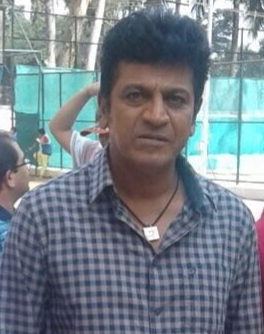
Shiva Rajkumar

Shiva Rajkumar is an Indian actor who appears in Kannada films. He is the eldest son of actor Rajkumar. Shivanna has acted in more than 125 films in lead roles.

== Films ==
- All films are in Kannada, unless other wise noted.

Key
| † | Denotes films that have not yet been released |

| Year | Film | Role(s) | Notes | Ref. |
|---|---|---|---|---|
| 1968 | Dhoomakethu | | Child artist (uncredited) | |
| 1974 | Sri Srinivasa Kalyana | Padmavathi's brother | Child artist (Master Puttaswamy) | |
| 1986 | Anand | Anand | Cinema Express Award for Best Actor | |
| 1986 | Ratha Sapthami | Vishwanath / Lawrence | | |
| 1987 | Manamecchida Hudugi | Shivu | | |
| 1988 | Shiva Mecchida Kannappa | Dinna/Arjuna | | |
| 1988 | Samyuktha | Shivraj | | |
| 1988 | Ranaranga | Anand | Playback singer for "O Meghave" | |
| 1989 | Inspector Vikram | Vikram | | |
| 1989 | Ade Raaga Ade Haadu | Chandru/Nanda | | |
| 1990 | Aasegobba Meesegobba | Ram Prasad Sharma / Lakshman Prasad Sharma a.k.a. Lucky | Playback singer for "Thanana Thandana" and "Bombato Bombato" | |
| 1990 | Mruthyunjaya | Chandru | | |
| 1991 | Aralida Hoovugalu | Vijay Kumar | | |
| 1991 | Modada Mareyalli | Ravi | | |
| 1992 | Midida Shruthi | Balu | | |
| 1992 | Purushotthama | Raj-Paramshivu | | |
| 1992 | Mavanige Thakka Aliya | Ganesha | | |
| 1992 | Belliyappa Bangarappa | Himself | Cameo | |
| 1993 | Jaga Mechida Huduga | Shivu | | |
| 1993 | Chirabandhavya | Rahul | | |
| 1993 | Ananda Jyothi | Anand | | |
| 1994 | Gandhada Gudi Part 2 | Shankar | | |
| 1994 | Mutthanna | Muthanna / Diamond Kiran | Dual role | |
| 1994 | Gandugali | Mahesh | | |
| 1995 | Gadibidi Aliya | Shivu / Raj | Dual role | |
| 1995 | Savyasachi | Akhilesh/Viraat | | |
| 1995 | Om | Satyamurthy Shastri | Filmfare Award for Best Actor – Kannada; Karnataka State Film Award for Best Actor | |
| 1995 | Mana Midiyithu | Anand | | |
| 1995 | Samara | Uday | | |
| 1995 | Dore | Dore | | |
| 1996 | Ibbara Naduve Muddina Aata | Shivanna | | |
| 1996 | Gajanura Gandu | Rajendra | | |
| 1996 | Shiva Sainya | Shiva | | |
| 1996 | Annavra Makkalu | Shiva / Ramu / Kumar | Triple role | |
| 1996 | Nammoora Mandara Hoove | Manoj | Filmfare Award for Best Actor – Kannada | |
| 1996 | Aadithya | Aditya | | |
| 1996 | Janumada Jodi | Krishna | Playback singer for "Mani Mani Mani Mani" | |
| 1997 | Ganga Yamuna | Shankar | | |
| 1997 | Simhada Mari | Vishwa | | |
| 1997 | Ammavra Ganda | Raju | | |
| 1997 | Muddina Kanmani | Shivram Hegde | | |
| 1997 | Raaja | Raja | | |
| 1997 | Jodi Hakki | Maacha / Manoj | | |
| 1997 | Prema Raga Haadu Gelathi | Anand | | |
| 1998 | Nammoora Huduga | Gopala | | |
| 1998 | Kurubana Rani | Kencha | | |
| 1998 | Andaman | Anand | Playback singer for "Andaman Andaman" | |
| 1998 | Mr. Putsami | Putsami | | |
| 1998 | Bhoomi Thayiya Chochchala Maga | Karna | | |
| 1998 | Gadibidi Krishna | Krishna / Dr. Shivram | Dual role | |
| 1999 | Janumadatha | Teju | | |
| 1999 | Chandrodaya | Shivu | | |
| 1999 | A.K. 47 | Raam | Filmfare Award for Best Actor – Kannada | |
| 1999 | Vishwa | Vishwa | | |
| 1999 | Hrudaya Hrudaya | Ravi | Karnataka State Film Award for Best Actor | |
| 2000 | Yare Nee Abhimani | Aditya | | |
| 2000 | Preethse | Surya | | |
| 2000 | Hagalu Vesha | Ramu | | |
| 2000 | Indradhanush | Harindranath | | |
| 2000 | Krishna Leele | Krishna | | |
| 2000 | Devara Maga | Bharatha | | |
| 2000 | Galate Aliyandru | Manu | Playback singer for "Kundapurada Meenamma" | |
| 2001 | Maduve Aagona Baa | Anand | | |
| 2001 | Asura | Vasu | | |
| 2001 | Bahala Chennagide | Krishna | | |
| 2001 | Baava Baamaida | Raju | | |
| 2001 | Sundara Kanda | Venkatesh | | |
| 2001 | Yuvaraja | Raju | | |
| 2001 | Jodi | Vinod | | |
| 2002 | Kodanda Rama | Rama | | |
| 2002 | Ninne Preethisuve | Major Srinivas | Extended cameo appearance | |
| 2002 | Thavarige Baa Thangi | Shivanna | | |
| 2003 | Don | Surya | | |
| 2003 | Sri Ram | Sriram | | |
| 2003 | Smile | Mahesh Kumar | | |
| 2003 | Nanjundi | Nanjunda | | |
| 2003 | Chigurida Kanasu | Shankar / Datthanna | Dual role Playback singer for "Aa Aa Ee Ee"; Karnataka State Film Award for Best Actor | |
| 2004 | Rowdy Aliya | Raja | | |
| 2004 | Sarvabhouma | Subhash Chandra / Jeeva | Dual role | |
| 2004 | Kanchana Ganga | Soorya | | |
| 2005 | Rishi | Rishi | | |
| 2005 | Rakshasa | ACP Harish Chandra | | |
| 2005 | Valmiki | Ram / Bharamanna | Dual role | |
| 2005 | Jogi | Madesha | Karnataka State Film Award for Best Actor | |
| 2005 | Anna Thangi | Appanna/Shivanna | Dual role | |
| 2006 | Ashoka | Ashok | | |
| 2006 | Thavarina Siri | Muthanna | | |
| 2006 | Gandugali Kumara Rama | Kumara Rama | | |
| 2007 | Thayiya Madilu | Nandakumar | Playback singer for "Yeke Heegaitho" | |
| 2007 | No 73, Shanthi Nivasa | Himself | Special appearance | |
| 2007 | Santha | Santhosha "Santha" | | |
| 2007 | Gandana Mane | Raja | Playback singer for "Karunada Kannadiga" | |
| 2007 | Lava Kusha | Chinnu | | |
| 2008 | Sathya In Love | Sathya | | |
| 2008 | Bandhu Balaga | Subramanya | | |
| 2008 | Madesha | Madesha | | |
| 2008 | Paramesha Paanwala | Parmesha | | |
| 2009 | Nanda | Nanda | | |
| 2009 | Hatrick Hodi Maga | Surya | | |
| 2009 | Bhagyada Balegara | Chennayya | | |
| 2009 | Devaru Kotta Thangi | Shivu | | |
| 2010 | Sugreeva | Sugreeva | | |
| 2010 | Thamassu | Shankar | Filmfare Award for Best Actor – Kannada | |
| 2010 | Cheluveye Ninne Nodalu | Vishwa | Playback singer for "Janumana Kotta" | |
| 2010 | Mylari | Mylari | | |
| 2011 | Jogayya | Madesha | Nominated–SIIMA Award for Best Actor | |
| 2012 | Shiva | Shiva | SIIMA Award for Best Actor | |
| 2013 | Lakshmi | Lakshmi Narayan | Playback singer for "Naanu Footpathnalli" | |
| 2013 | Andhar Bahar | Surya | | |
| 2013 | Kaddipudi | Anand alias Kaddipudi | | |
| 2013 | Bhajarangi | Bhajarangi / Jeeva | Dual role; SIIMA Award for Best Actor; Nominated—Filmfare Award for Best Actor – Kannada | |
| 2014 | Aryan | Aryan | | |
| 2014 | Belli | Basavaraj "Belli" | | |
| 2015 | Vajrakaya | Viraj | | |
| 2016 | Killing Veerappan | A Special Task Force strategist | Playback singer for "Hayya Hayya" | |
| 2016 | Shivalinga | Shiva | | |
| 2016 | Santheyalli Nintha Kabira | Kabeera | | |
| 2017 | Srikanta | Srikanta | Playback singer for "Kannane Kannane" | |
| 2017 | Gautamiputra Satakarni | Kalahastheeshwara | Telugu film; Guest appearance | |
| 2017 | Bangara s/o Bangarada Manushya | Shiva | | |
| 2017 | Mass Leader | Shivaraj | | |
| 2017 | Mufti | Bairathi Rangal | Nominated—Love Lavike Readers Choice Awards for Best Actor Male; Nominated—Filmfare Award for Best Actor – Kannada; Nominated—SIIMA Award for Best Actor in a Leading Role — Male (Kannada) | |
| 2018 | Tagaru | Shivakumar "Tagaru Shiva" | | |
| 2018 | The Villain | Ramappa | | |
| 2019 | Kavacha | Jayaram/Ramappa | | |
| 2019 | Rustum | DSP Abhishek Bhargav (Rustum) | | |
| 2019 | Ayushman Bhava | Krishna | | |
| 2020 | Drona | Guru / Drona | | |
| 2021 | Bhajarangi 2 | Bhajarangi Anji | Dual role | |
| 2022 | James | Anandraj | Guest appearance | |
| 2022 | Bairagee | Shivappa | Playback singer for "Rhythm of Shivappa" | |
| 2022 | Vedha | Vedha | Producer; Playback singer for "Pushpa Pushpa" | |
| 2023 | Kabzaa | Siddhantha | Guest appearance | |
| 2023 | Jailer | Narasimha | Tamil film; cameo appearance | |
| 2023 | Ghost | Dalavayi Muddanna (Big Daddy) / Anand Rao | Dual role | |
| 2024 | Captain Miller | Sengolan alias Senganna | Tamil film | |
| 2024 | Karataka Damanaka | Virupaksha/Karataka | | |
| 2024 | Bhairathi Ranagal | Bhairathi Ranagal | | |
| 2025 | Veera Chandrahasa | Nadaprabhu Shivaputtaswamy | Cameo appearance | |
| 2025 | Firefly | The King delivery man | Cameo appearance | |
| 2025 | 45 | Shivanna | | |
| 2026 | Raktha Kashmira | Himself | Special appearance in the song "Star Star" | |
| 2026 | Peddi | Gournaidu | Telugu film | |
| 2026 | Bail | Vijay Kumar "Viji" | | |
| 2026 | Jailer 2 | Narasimha | Tamil film Cameo appearance | |
| 2026 | Picasso † | Shanmugam | Tamil film; Post-production | |
| 2026 | Dad † | TBA | Filming | |
| 2026 | 666 Operation Dream Theatre † | TBA | Filming | |
| 2026 | Gummadi Narsaiah † | Gummadi Narsaiah | Filming; Telugu film | |
| 2026 | Survivor - A Superstar Documentary † | Himself | Filming | |
| 2026 | A for Anand † | Anand | Filming; unreleased | |

== As voice actor ==
| Year | Film | Role(s) | Notes | Ref. |
|---|---|---|---|---|
| 2016 | Doddmane Hudga | Narrator | | |
| 2022 | James | James/Santhosh Kumar | Dub-over voice for Puneeth Rajkumar | |
| 2024 | ARM | Cosmic creator (Narrator) | Dub-over voice | |

== As singer ==
| Year | Film | Song(s) | Notes |
|---|---|---|---|
| 1988 | Ranaranga | O Meghave | |
| 1990 | Aasegobba Meesegobba | Thandana Thandana, Bombato Bombato | |
| 1992 | Purushotthama | Kanchana Kanchana | |
| 1996 | Janumada Jodi | Mani Mani | |
| 1997 | Prema Raaga Haadu Gelathi | O Baale Baale | |
| 1998 | Andaman | Andaman Andaman | |
| 2000 | Latest the album | 14 songs | |
| 2000 | Galate Aliyandru | Kundapurada Meenamma | |
| 2003 | Don | Ondene Naavu Ondene | |
| 2003 | Chigurida Kanasu | A Aa E Ee | |
| 2007 | Thayiya Madilu | Yeke Heegaitho | |
| 2007 | Gandana Mane | Karunada Kannadiga | |
| 2010 | Cheluveye Ninne Nodalu | Janumana Kotta | |
| 2013 | Lakshmi | Naanu Footpath nalli | |
| 2016 | Killing Veerappan | Hayya Hayya | |
| 2016 | Doddmane Hudga | Abhimanigale | |
| 2017 | Srikanta | Kannane Kannane | |
| 2018 | Abhaya Hasta | Sri Ramadhootha Hanuma | |
| 2021 | Kannadiga | Kannadiga Title Track | |
| 2022 | Bairagee | Rhythm of Shivappa | |
| 2022 | Vedha | Pushpa Pushpa | |
