= Gol Maal =

1979 Indian film by Hrishikesh Mukherjee

- Theatrical release poster
- Directed by: Hrishikesh Mukherjee
- Written by: Rahi Masoom Raza (dialogues)
- Screenplay by: Sachin Bhowmick
- Produced by: N. C. Sippy
- Starring: Utpal Dutt; Amol Palekar; Bindiya Goswami
- Music by: R. D. Burman
- Release date: 20 April 1979
- Country: India
- Language: Hindi

Gol Maal (transl. Twisty-Turvy) is a 1979 Indian Hindi-language comedy film directed by Hrishikesh Mukherjee and written by Rahi Masoom Raza and Sachin Bhowmick the film was produced by N. C. Sippy, with music by R. D. Burman. The film won several awards and was praised by critics.

The film was remade in Tamil as Thillu Mullu (1981), in Kannada as Aasegobba Meesegobba (1990), in Malayalam as Simhavalan Menon (1995), and in Sinhala as Rasa Rahasak. The film was an inspiration for the Hindi movie Bol Bachchan (2012) which was remade in Telugu as Masala (2013).

== Plot ==
Ramprasad Dashrathprasad Sharma, a chartered accountant and singer, lives with his sister Ratna and searches for a job after completing his education. His uncle Kedar informs him of an opening at his acquaintance Bhavani Shankar's firm called Urmila Traders. Shankar is a man of traditional values, who hates modern attire and sports, and also carries an irrational contempt for men without mustaches. Following Kedar's advice, Sharma appears for the interview in a kurta and feigns ignorance about sports, impressing Shankar who hires him immediately.

A few days later, he takes leave to watch a hockey match by lying that his mother, who is long dead, has fallen ill. Shankar, who secretly enjoys sports, attends the same match and spots Sharma. When confronted the next day, Sharma lies again that it was his clean-shaven twin brother, Lakshmanprasad aka Lucky, a singer, who was at the match.

Bhavani Shankar buys the lie and summons Lucky to teach music to his daughter Urmila. With help from his friend Deven, Sharma shaves his mustache and starts living a double life as Lucky- a modern, easy-going man completely opposite to Ramprasad. Urmila immediately takes a liking to him. Sometime later, Bhavani Shankar expresses his wish to meet Sharma's mother. To solve this predicament, Sharma recruits a socialite, Kamala Srivastava, to pretend to be his mother while meeting Shankar. Later on, Kamala also faces a similar situation when Shankar attends a party she is in, and recognises her. She too lies that she has a twin sister, confusing the man.

Bhavani Shankar notices Urmila's fondness for Lucky, and decides to get her married to Ramprasad instead, whom he considers a better match. Sharma eventually reveals the truth to an upset Urmila, and decides to drop his persona of Lucky. They approach Shankar to tell him that Lucky ran away, and Urmila agrees to marry Ramprasad. Shankar however notices Sharma's fake mustache and assumes that Lucky killed and impersonated Ramprasad in order to marry Urmila. He then chases the fleeing Sharma and Urmila in his car but gets arrested, being mistaken for a lookalike smuggler. When released, he finds them both married and refuses to accept the union until Kedar and Deven explain the situation. Shankar eventually concedes, and ends up shaving his own mustache.

== Cast ==
- Utpal Dutt as Bhawani Shankar, Owner of Urmila Traders / Pascal D'Costa (smuggler)
- Amol Palekar as Ramprasad Dashrathprasad Sharma / Laxmanprasad Dashrathprasad Sharma aka Lucky
- Bindiya Goswami as Urmila Shankar, Bhavani Shankar's daughter and love interest of Laxman
- David as Doctor Kedar Mama, Bhavani Shankar's friend
- Deven Verma as himself
- Dina Pathak as Kamala Srivastava / Vimala Sharma (Fake), Ram and Laxman's fake mother
- Manju Singh as Ratna Sharma, Ram's sister
- Shubha Khote as Kalindi aka Buaji
- Yunus Parvez as Bade Babu, Working at Urmila traders.
- Keshto Mukherjee as Drunkard (Guest appearance)
- Anjan Srivastav as Police Officer Sharma (Guest Appearance)
- Om Prakash as Police Officer (Guest Appearance)
- Amitabh Bachchan as himself (Guest Appearance)
- Rekha as herself (Guest Appearance)
- Hema Malini as herself (Guest Appearance)
- Zeenat Aman as herself (Guest Appearance)
- Aruna Irani as herself (Guest Appearance)
- Moolchand as Man who was in cinema hall
- Harish Magon as Interview candidate Badri Narayan Shrivastav
- Anand as Ram's friend Anand
- Yasmin as Girl in song 'Sapne me dekha sapana'
- Amol Sen as Office peon in Urmila Traders

== Soundtrack ==
The music of the film was composed by R. D. Burman and lyrics were written by Gulzar.

=== Track listing ===
No.	Title	Singer	Length
1.	"Aanewala Pal Jane Wala Hai" (Raga Kirwani)	Kishore Kumar
2.	"Ek Din Sapne Mein Dekha Sapna"	Kishore Kumar Amit Kumar
3.	"Gol Maal Hai Bhai Sab Gol Maal Hai"	Sapan Chakraborty, R.D.Burman
4.	"Ek Baat Kahu Gar Maano Tum"	Lata Mangeshkar

== Production ==
Hrishikesh Mukherjee had first selected Rekha to enact the heroine's part, but felt that he would be wasting a talented actress in a film where the hero was the mainstay. He replaced her with Bindiya Goswami. The whole film was shot in 40 working days.

== Remakes ==
Year	Film	Language	Director	Ref.
1981	Thillu Mullu	Tamil	K. Balachander	
1988	Rasa Rahasak	Sinhala	Yasapalitha Nanayakkara	
1990	Aasegobba Meesegobba	Kannada	M. S. Rajashekar	
1995	Simhavalan Menon	Malayalam	Viji Thampi	
2013	Thillu Mullu	Tamil	Badri	

David Dhawan's 2002 film Chor Machaaye Shor had many scenes plagiarised from Gol Maal. The 2012 film Bol Bachchan, directed by Rohit Shetty is loosely based on Gol Maal. It was also later remade in Telugu as Masala. The Malayalam film Ayalvasi Oru Daridravasi adapted several scenes from Gol Maal.

== Awards ==
27th Filmfare Awards:

Won

- Best Actor – Amol Palekar
- Best Comedian – Utpal Dutt
- Best Lyricist – Gulzar for "Aane Wala Pal"

Nominated

- Best Director – Hrishikesh Mukherjee
- Best Supporting Actor – Utpal Dutt
- Best Supporting Actress – Dina Pathak
- Best Comedian – Deven Verma
- Best Story – Sailesh Dey
