= B. C. Gowrishankar =

Indian (Kannada-cinema) cinematographer, and director (1950-2004)

- Born: 26 February 1950; Bangalore, Mysore State (now Karnataka), India
- Died: 16 November 2004 (aged 54); Bangalore, India
- Occupations: Cinematographer, film director, screenwriter
- Years active: 1977–2004
- Spouse: Mamatha Rao
- Children: Rakshita

B. C. Gowrishankar (25 February 1950 – 16 November 2004) was an Indian cinematographer and occasional film director and screenwriter who worked primarily in Kannada cinema. He was known for his unorthodox style as a cinematographer and was recognised for his work in both art and commercial films. Gowrishankar won six Karnataka State Film Awards during his career as a cinematographer. In 1988 he directed the fairly successful Elu Suttina Kote with Ambareesh, Gautami and a young Ramesh Aravind.

== Personal life ==
=== Early life ===
Gowrishankar was born on 26 February 1950 to B. Channabasappa and Shashimukhi in Bangalore. He received the Diploma in Cinematography from Jayachamarajendra Polytechnic and worked in the Kanteerava Studios, Bangalore for some time.

=== Married life ===
Gowrishankar married Mamatha Rao, a Kannada actress who acted in movies like Hosa Belaku, Praaya Praaya Praaya and Antharala. His daughter Rakshita was a popular actress during the 2000s.

== Career ==
Gowrishankar debuted as a cinematographer in the 1977 Kannada language film Anuroopa. Along with Anuroopa, his work in 1970s films like Spandana (1978) and Arivu (1979) won his critical acclaim.

In the 1995 critically acclaimed mafia film Om (1995), he used filters to capture the mood of the underworld. His work in Pushpaka Vimana (1987) and Mungarina Minchu (1998) was appreciated. In the 1996 film Janumada Jodi, he picturised the song "Mani Mani Manigondu Daara" on Shivarajkumar, Shilpa and Pavithra Lokesh with the sunset in the backdrop, for nine days, as the sunset would last only for a few minutes. The song "Deepavu Ninnade Gaaliyu Ninnade" from the film Mysore Mallige (1992) was picturised by him on Sudharani in the light of one small lamp. His work in the film won him his fifth State Film Award.

== Death ==
In November 2004, Gowrishankar died at a private clinic, where he had been admitted with lung and liver problems three days ago.

== Awards ==
- Karnataka State Film Award for Best Cinematographer
  - Spandana (1977–78)
  - Arivu (1979–80)
  - Minchina Ota (1979–80)
  - Dhruva Thare (1985–86)
  - Mysore Mallige (1991–92)
  - Om (1995–96)

== Filmography ==
=== As cinematographer ===
- Anuroopa (1977)
- Huli Banthu Huli (1978)
- Aparichitha (1978)
- Spandana (1978)
- Khandavideko Mamsavideko (1979)
- Madhu Chandra (1979)
- Ene Barali Preethi Irali (1979)
- Arivu (1979)
- Minchina Ota (1980)
- Prema Anuraga (1980)
- Doddamane Estate (1980)
- Janma Janmada Anubandha (1980)
- Gaali Maathu (1981)
- Geetha (1981)
- Muniyana Madari (1981)
- Aalemane (1981)
- Hosa Belaku (1982)
- Amara Madhura Prema (1982)
- Nanna Devaru (1982)
- Chalisuva Modagalu (1982)
- Antharala (1982)
- Betthale Seve (1982)
- Kaamana Billu (1983)
- Gayathri Maduve (1983)
- Eradu Nakshatragalu (1983)
- Samayada Gombe (1984)
- Prema Sakshi (1984)
- Ramapurada Ravana (1984)
- Shrungara Masa (1984)
- Marali Goodige (1984)
- Apoorva Sangama (1984)
- Bettada Hoovu (1985)
- Jwaalamukhi (1985)
- Dhruva Thare (1985)
- Bangalore Rathriyalli (1985)
- Anand (1986)
- Ondu Muttina Kathe (1987)
- Vijayotsava (1987)
- Manamecchida Hudugi (1987)
- Kendada Male (1987)
- Pushpaka Vimana (1987)
- Elu Suttina Kote (1988)
- Ade Raaga Ade Haadu (1990)
- Aasegobba Meesegobba (1990)
- Kadina Veera (1990)
- Michael Madana Kama Rajan (1990; Tamil)
- Aata Bombata (1990)
- Hrudaya Haadithu (1991)
- Gandu Sidigundu (1991)
- Kalyana Mantapa (1991)
- Mysore Mallige (1992)
- Belliyappa Bangarappa (1992)
- Mannina Doni (1992)
- Angaili Apsare (1993)
- Urvashi Kalyana (1993)
- Chinnari Mutha (1993)
- Roopayi Raja (1993)
- Phool (1993; Hindi)
- Odahuttidavaru (1994)
- Sagara Deepa (1994)
- Om (1995)
- Police Power(1995)
- Soothradhara (1996)
- Janumada Jodi (1996)
- Chikka (1997)
- Mungarina Minchu (1997)
- Vimochane (1997)
- Swasthik (1998)
- Bhoomi Thayiya Chochchala Maga (1998)
- Janumadatha (1999)
- Tuvvi Tuvvi Tuvvi (1999)
- Hrudaya Hrudaya (1999)
- Aryabhata (1999)
- Mahatma (2000)
- Krishna Leele (2000)
- Kurigalu Saar Kurigalu (2001)
- Premi No.1 (2001)
- Kothigalu Saar Kothigalu (2001)
- Love Lavike (2002)
- Prema (2002)
- Singaaravva (2003)
- Chigurida Kanasu (2003)
- Kanchana Ganga (2004)

=== As director ===
- Kendada Mele (1987)
- Elu Suttina Kote (1988)
- Aata Bombata (1990)

=== As screenwriter ===
- Elu Suttina Kote (1988)
- Aata Bombata (1990)
