= Purushotthama (film) =

- VCD cover
- Directed by: M. S. Rajashekar
- Written by: T. N. Narasimhan
- Produced by: Madhu Bangarappa
- Starring: Shiva Rajkumar; Shivaranjini; Madhubala; Srinath
- Cinematography: V. K. Kannan
- Edited by: S. Manohar
- Music by: Hamsalekha
- Production company: Sri Renukamba Combines
- Release date: 10 April 1992
- Running time: 140 minutes
- Country: India
- Language: Kannada

Purushotthama is a 1992 Indian Kannada-language romance drama film directed by M. S. Rajashekar and produced by Madhu Bangarappa. The film stars Shiva Rajkumar, Shivaranjini and Ranjitha (in her Kannada debut - credited as Madhubala).

== Cast ==
- Shiva Rajkumar as Paramashiva a.k.a. Shivu
- Shivaranjini
- Ranjitha (credited as Madhubala)
- Srinath
- Balakrishna
- Mukhyamantri Chandru
- Thoogudeepa Srinivas
- Vajramuni
- Ashok
- Prithviraj
- Sudheer

== Soundtrack ==
The soundtrack of the film was composed by Hamsalekha.All songs were hit

Track listing
| No. | Title | Lyrics | Singer(s) | Length |
|---|---|---|---|---|
| 1. | "Shiva Shiva" | Hamsalekha | Rajkumar |
| 2. | "Madhuvade Neenu" | Hamsalekha | S. P. Balasubrahmanyam, Manjula Gururaj |
| 3. | "Supero Supero Hudugi" | Hamsalekha | S. P. Balasubrahmanyam, K. S. Chithra, Manjula Gururaj |
| 4. | "Kanchana Kanchana" | Hamsalekha | Shivarajkumar, Manjula Gururaj |
| 5. | "Naanu Nimmavanu" | Hamsalekha | Rajkumar |
