= Pattabhishekam =

Pattabhishekam (lit. 'coronation') may refer to:

- Pattabhishekam (1985 film), an Indian Telugu-language romance film
- Pattabhishekam (1999 film), an Indian Malayalam-language comedy film
