= Ganeshana Galate =

- Directed by: Phani Ramachandra
- Written by: J. M. Prahlad
- Produced by: Lahari Velu
- Starring: Shashi Kumar; Sithara
- Music by: Rajan–Nagendra
- Release date: 1995
- Country: India
- Language: Kannada

Ganeshana Galate is a 1995 Kannada film directed by Phani Ramachandra. J. M. Prahlad wrote the story, which uses Phani Ramachandra's favourite screen-title Ganesha. Shashikumar replaced Ananth Nag in the titular character. The film also stars Sithara while Ramesh Bhat plays a supporting role.

The movie was based on the 1978 British movie The Odd Job. The film was an inspiration for the 2013 Kannada film Victory.

== Cast ==
- Shashi Kumar as Ganesha
- Sithara as Ganesha's Wife
- Ramesh Bhat as policy agent Bhatta
- Silk Smitha as Contract Killer
- Anant Nag as Lambhodhara Cameo appearance
- Anjana

== Soundtrack ==
Soundtrack was composed by Rajan-Nagendra.

- "Ganda Hendathi Emnare" - P. B. Sreenivas
- "Bhagyada Lakshmi Bandaaythu" - S. Janaki, S. P. Balasubrahmanyam
- "Don’T Worry Chinna" - S. P. Balasubrahmanyam
- "Come Come Darling" - S. Janaki
- "Preethiya Selethave" - S. P. Balasubrahmanyam
- "Killer Naane Killer" - S. Janaki
