= Aranyakanda (film) =

1986 Indian action thriller film

- Theatrical release poster
- Directed by: Kranthi Kumar
- Written by: Ganesh Patro (dialogues)
- Story by: Komanappali Ganapathi Rao
- Produced by: C. Penchal Reddy
- Starring: Nagarjuna; Ashwini; Rajendra Prasad
- Cinematography: Hari Anumolu
- Edited by: B. Krishnam Raju
- Music by: Chakravarthy
- Production company: Ushodaya Enterprises
- Release date: 29 December 1986
- Running time: 170 minutes
- Country: India
- Language: Telugu

Aranyakanda (transl. The Book of Jungle); is a 1986 Telugu-language action thriller film produced by C. Penchal Reddy under the Ushodaya Enterprises banner, and directed by Kranthi Kumar. It stars Nagarjuna, Ashwini, Rajendra Prasad. The soundtrack is composed by Chakravarthy.

== Plot ==
The film revolves around a forest where the protection of a tribe against a tiger and deadly gangsters by a forest officer, Chaitanya. Chaitanya goes to the jungle to solve the case of the tiger killing the local tribals. He meets the love birds Sanga & Neeli there, but they cannot marry due to caste problems. After going through the case, Chaitanya realizes that the tiger is not harming the people, but some cowardly people are doing all this. The rest of the story shows how he eradicates evil activities and what he has to pay for them.

== Cast ==
- Nagarjuna as Chaitanya
- Ashwini as Preethi
- Rajendra Prasad as Sangadu
- Charan Raj as Bukutha
- Prabhakar Reddy as Preethi's father
- Rallapalli as Chinna Bukutha
- P. J. Sarma as DFO
- Bob Christo as Rowdy
- Radhika as Poornima
- Annapurna as Chaitanya's mother
- Tulasi as Neeli
- Sri Lakshmi as Chinna Dorasani

== Soundtrack ==
Aranya Kanda

Film score by Chakravarthy
- Released: 1986
- Genre: Soundtrack
- Length: 20:30
- Label: Saptaswar Audio
- Producer: Chakravarthy

Chakravarthy chronology
Pratidwani (1986)	Aranya Kanda (1986)	Veta (1986)

The music was composed by Chakravarthy. Lyrics were written by Veturi. The music released on SAPTASWAR Audio Company.

Telugu Tracklist
No.	Title	Singer(s)	Length
1.	"Idhe Aranyakanda"	S. P. Balasubrahmanyam	3:32
2.	"Bagunnava"	P. Susheela, Srinivas Chakravarthy	4:28
3.	"Jabilliga"	P. Susheela	4:03
4.	"Suryudu Jabili"	S. P. Balasubrahmanyam, P. Susheela	4:25
5.	"Puvvumeedha"	P. Susheela, Srinivas Chakravarthy	4:02

The film was later dubbed in Tamil as Agni Kanal with lyrics written by Liyakathsha.

Tamil Tracklist
No.	Title	Singer(s)	Length
1.	"Satthiyam"	Mano	3:32
2.	"Pakkame Vaa"	S. P. Sailaja, Mano	4:28
3.	"En Pallaiye"	S.P. Sailaja	4:03
4.	"Soodangal Maalaiyai"	Mano, S.P. Sailaja	4:25
5.	"Poovukkulle"	Mano, S.P. Sailaja	4:02
