= Mutthanna =

Mutthanna (1994)
- VCD cover
- Directed by: M. S. Rajashekar
- Written by: T. N. Narasimhan; Pal Sudharshan
- Story by: Jeevanprabha M. Desai
- Produced by: L. Somanna Gowda
- Starring: Shiva Rajkumar; Shashi Kumar; Supriya; Sneha
- Cinematography: R Madhusudhan
- Edited by: S. Manohar
- Music by: Hamsalekha
- Production company: Kaveri Amma arts
- Release date: 7 October 1994
- Running time: 146 minutes
- Country: India
- Language: Kannada

Mutthanna is a 1994 Indian Kannada-language action drama film directed by M. S. Rajashekar and produced by L. Somanna Gowda. The movie stars Shiva Rajkumar in dual roles for the first time in his career alongside Supriya and Shashi Kumar in the leading roles.

The film is a remake of Manmohan Desai's Hindi film Sachaa Jhutha (1970). Shiva Rajkumar's eldest daughter made her only on-screen appearance in the movie, credited as Baby Nirupama Shiva Rajkumar. The film was re-released in digital format with 2K resolution & 7.1 surround sound in October 2017. Shivarajkumar had revealed that the movie was backed by Rowther Films.

== Plot ==
Mutthananna is a village simpleton, a good musician, and a poor orphan who lives with his physically impaired sister, Bhavani. Kiran Kumar, a.k.a. Diamond Kiran, is Mutthu's lookalike. He is a billionaire wanted for theft and diamond smuggling. Mutthu meets Kiran Kumar in the city and is shocked to see the similarity. Kiran convinces Mutthu to stay with him, pretending he is his twin brother. After some time, Kiran reveals to Mutthu that he is a cancer patient and requires help for his business. Mutthu accepts this offer without being aware of Kiran's past. When Mutthu discovers the truth, Kiran threatens him by torturing Bhavani.

== Cast ==
- Shiva Rajkumar as Mutthanna/Kiran Kumar (double role)
- Supriya as Mutthu's lover
- Shashikumar as a Police Inspector
- Sneha as a child artist
- Thoogudeepa Srinivas
- Doddanna as a Police Constable
- M. N. Lakshmi Devi
- Bhavyashree Rai as Bhavani (Mutthu's sister)
- Girija Lokesh as Kiran's Mother
- Mynavathi
- Ashwath Narayan
- Honnavalli Krishna as a coffee boy who wants a cheque

== Soundtrack ==
The soundtrack of the film was composed by Hamsalekha.

All lyrics are written by Hamsalekha.

Track listing
| No. | Title | Singer(s) | Length |
|---|---|---|---|
| 1. | "Mutthanna Peepi Uduva" | S. P. Balasubrahmanyam |
| 2. | "Hrudaya Bagila" | S. P. Balasubrahmanyam, K. S. Chithra |
| 3. | "Nooru Nooru Kohinooru" | S. P. Balasubrahmanyam, K. S. Chithra |
| 4. | "Mukha Nodi Mola Hakabeda" | S. P. Balasubrahmanyam |
| 5. | "Nangoo Aase" | S. P. Balasubrahmanyam, K. S. Chithra |
