= Kanasina Rani =

- Directed by: M. S. Rajashekar
- Screenplay by: Chi. Udaya Shankar
- Produced by: M. Sunanda; M. Krishna
- Starring: Malashri; Shashikumar; Jaggesh
- Cinematography: Prasad Babu; Lokesh Babu
- Edited by: Shyam Yadav
- Music by: Upendra Kumar
- Production company: Sri Lakshmi Productions
- Release date: 1992
- Running time: 126 minutes
- Country: India
- Language: Kannada

Kanasina Rani (English: Queen of dreams) is a 1992 Indian Kannada language film directed by M. S. Rajashekar and produced by M. Sunanda and M. Krishna under the banner Sri Lakshmi Productions. The film stars Malashri, Shashikumar and Jaggesh. The supporting cast features Thriveni, K. S. Ashwath, Thoogudeepa Srinivas, Girija Lokesh, Tennis Krishna and Vajramuni.

The film was success and the title of the film stuck as a prefix to the lead actress, who was henceforth referred to, sometimes as Kanasina Rani Malashri.

== Cast ==
- Shashi Kumar as Raja
- Malashri as Prabhavati
- Jaggesh as Bhaskar
- Thriveni as Rama
- K. S. Ashwath as Ramu
- Thoogudeepa Srinivas as Badrinath, Rama's father
- Girija Lokesh as Rama's mother
- Ashalatha as Sharada
- Tennis Krishna as Kitti
- Vajramuni as Sadananda
- Rajanand as Vishwanath
- Agro Chikkanna
- Killer Venkatesh

== Soundtrack ==
Kanasina Rani
- Soundtrack cover

Soundtrack album by Upendra Kumar
- Released: 11 June 1991
- Genre: Feature film soundtrack
- Length: 22:39
- Language: Kannada
- Label: Lahiri Music

Upendra Kumar composed the music for the film and the soundtrack. The soundtrack album consists of five tracks.

Track list
No.	Title	Singer(s)	Length
1.	"Bhoomigilidha Rambheyanthe"	S. P. Balasubrahmanyam	4:20
2.	"Onti Kaalinalina"	Manjula Gururaj	4:39
3.	"Muniseke Biruseke"	S. P. Balasubrahmanyam	4:31
4.	"Nudigalu Mutthanthe"	Manjula Gururaj, L. N. Shastry	4:39
5.	"Ninna Nodidaagale"	Manjula Gururaj, L. N. Shastry	4:30
Total length:			22:39
