= Manju Singh =

Indian television producer (1948–2022)

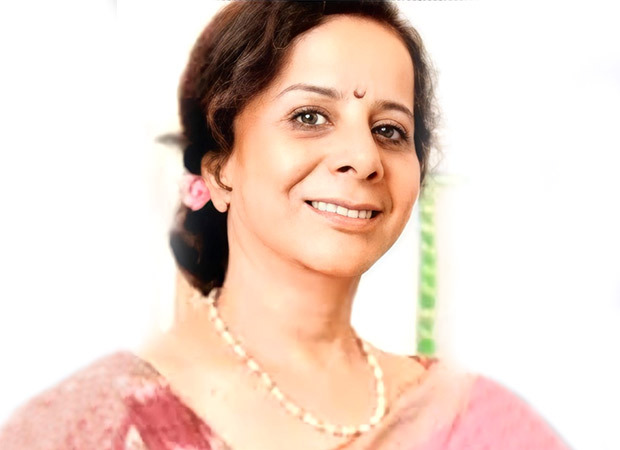
Manju Singh

Manju Singh (1948 – 14 April 2022) was an Indian actor and film and television producer.

She is known for playing "Didi", the anchor of the children's television programme Khel Khilone which she conducted for 7 years, and for her role in the 1979 Hrishikesh Mukherjee film Gol Maal.

Manju Singh launched her career as a television producer in 1983 with Show Theme, the first sponsored show on Indian Television. From 1984 onwards she produced Ek Kahani, the prime time series on Doordarshan based on literary short stories from regional languages, Adhikar, the docudrama series on women's legal rights, Samyaktva: True Insight, a show on the relevance of spirituality and ancient Indian wisdom in the 21st century, and the historical TV series Swaraj based on the life of Bhagat Singh and his comrades to commemorate fifty years of Indian Independence.

In 2007, Singh founded the WorldKids Foundation with an objective to promote "Entertainment with a Purpose". WorldKids initiatives include the WorldKids International Film Festival (WKIFF), the WorldKids Film Club in association with the National Centre for the Performing Arts and Lessons in the Dark, a program that introduces children and young adults to cinema and film-appreciation in their classrooms.

In 2015, in recognition of her contribution to the creative arts and the education field, Ms. Manju Singh was nominated as a member to the Central Advisory Board of Education (CABE), Govt. of India.
