= Ashwini (actress) =

Indian actress

- Ashwini
- Born: Ashwini; 14 July 1967; Nellore
- Died: 23 September 2012 (aged 45); Chennai, Tamil Nadu, India
- Years active: 1979–2012

Ashwini was an Indian actress, primarily in Telugu, Tamil and Malayalam films. She appeared in more than 100 films in various South Indian languages.

== Career ==
Ashwini made her debut as a child artiste in Bhakta Dhruva Markandeya and later shared screen space with Balakrishna in Bhale Thammudu, Venkatesh in Kaliyuga Pandavulu, Rajendra Prasad in Station Master, and Nagarjuna in Aranyakanda.

== Filmography ==
Year	Title	Role	Language	Notes
1982	Bhakta Dhruva Markandeya		Telugu	Debut
1983	Aanandha Kummi	Selvi	Tamil	
1985	Boeing Boeing	Indhu	Malayalam	
1985	Kannaram Pothi Pothi	Lakshmi	Malayalam	
1985	Anaadiga Adadi	Rekha	Telugu	
1985	Bhale Thammudu	Saraswathi	Telugu	
1985	Srivaru		Shanthi	
1985	Karpoora Deepam		Tamil	
1986	Aranyakanda	Preethi	Telugu	
1986	Mattukara Mannaru		Tamil	
1986	Attagaaroo Swagatam		Telugu	
1986	Dora Bidda		Telugu	
1986	Konte Kapuram		Telugu	
1986	Niramulla Ravulkal	Radha	Malayalam	
1986	Kanmaniye Pesu	Priya	Tamil	
1987	Trimurtulu	Rani	Telugu	
1987	Bhanumati Gari Mogudu	Gowri	Telugu	
1987	America Abbayi	Jyotsna	Telugu	
1987	Inti Donga		Telugu	
1987	Rowdy Babayi		Telugu	
1987	Kaliyuga Pandavulu	Meku	Telugu	
1988	Choopulu Kalisina Subhavela	Padma	Telugu	
1988	Vivaha Bhojanambu	Lavanya	Telugu	
1988	Pelli Chesi Choodu	Uma	Telugu	
1988	Prema Kireetam		Telugu	
1988	Veguchukka Pagatichukka		Telugu	
1988	Station Master	Rani	Telugu	
1988	Mr Hero		Telugu	
1989	Gopala Rao Gari Abbayi	Ganga	Telugu	
1989	Koduku Diddina Kapuram	Geetha	Telugu	
1989	Poola Rangadu	Gowri	Telugu	
1989	Bharya Bhartala Bhagotham	Seetha, Radha	Telugu	
1989	Akari Kshanam		Telugu	
1990	Ee Kanni Koodi	Susan Philip / Kumudam	Malayalam	
1990	Challenge Gopalakrishna	Ganga	Kannada	
1990	Raktha Jwala		Telugu	
1990	Pondatti Thevai	Shanthi	Tamil	
1998	Dharma		Tamil	
1998	Kumbakonam Gopalu		Tamil	
1999	Maanaseega Kadhal	Paaru	Tamil	
1999	Unakkaga Ellam Unakkaga		Tamil	
2000	Ennamma Kannu		Tamil	
2000	Penngal		Tamil	
2001	Piriyadha Varam Vendum	Pushpa	Tamil	
2001	Mitta Miraasu		Tamil	
2010	Aattanayagann		Tamil	

== Death ==
She died at the Sri Ramachandra Hospital in Chennai on 23 September 2012. She was reported to have had a liver-related illness.

R. Parthiepan helped Ashwini's family carry her body in an ambulance to Andhra. He also undertook the payment for the education of Ashwini's son, Karthick.
