= Dhruva Thare =

- Poster
- Directed by: M. S. Rajashekar
- Screenplay by: Chi. Udayashankar
- Based on: Aparanji by Vijay Sasanur
- Produced by: S. A. Govindraj; V. Bharathwaj
- Starring: Rajkumar; Geetha; Deepa
- Cinematography: B. C. Gowrishankar
- Edited by: P. Bhaktavatsalam
- Music by: Upendra Kumar
- Production company: Nirupama Art Combines
- Release date: 1985
- Running time: 143 minutes
- Country: India
- Language: Kannada

Dhruva Thare ( transl. Pole star) is a 1985 Indian Kannada-language film directed by M. S. Rajashekar in his directorial debut. The film stars Rajkumar, Geetha and Deepa. The movie is famous for its songs composed by Upendra Kumar. It is based on the novel Aparanji written by Vijay Sasanur.

== Plot ==
Sagar is a well-known city lawyer who is on the side of truth all the time. He falls in love with Sudha, a college student and marries her. He develops his inner talent of painting and goes commercial with it. A grave disaster strikes his family, which later becomes a legal case. Whether he remains a painter and lets go of the case or fights for the truth forms the rest of the story.

== Cast ==
- Rajkumar as Sagar
- Geetha as Sudha, Sagar's wife
- Deepa as Sarala
- Thoogudeepa Srinivas as Pavan Kumar, Sarala's husband
- Balakrishna as Kalinga Rao, Sarala's father
- Shivaram as Shivarama Rao
- Shani Mahadevappa as Sher Khan
- Shankar Bhat
- Ashwath Narayan
- K S Ashwath as Advocate Johny Briganza
- Rajanand as Vishwanatha Rao, Sagar's father
- Sadashiva Brahmavar as Sudha's father

== Soundtrack ==
Dhruva Thare

Soundtrack album by Upendra Kumar
- Released: 1985
- Genre: Feature film soundtrack
- Label: Sangeetha

#	Song	Singer(s)	Lyrics
1	"Aa Moda Banalli"	Bangalore Latha, Dr. Rajkumar, Vani Jairam	Chi. Udaya Shankar
2	"Aa Rathiye Dharegilidante"	Dr. Rajkumar, Bangalore Latha	Chi. Udaya Shankar
3	"O Nalle Savinudiya"	Dr. Rajkumar, Vani Jairam	Chi. Udaya Shankar
4	"Nyayavelli Adagide"	Dr. Rajkumar, S. Janaki	Chi. Udaya Shankar

== Awards ==
Karnataka State Film Awards

- Second Best Film
- Best Story — Vijay Sasanur
- Best Cinematographer — B. C. Gowrishankar

== External Source ==
- Dhruva Thare at IMDb
