= Elu Suttina Kote =

- Directed by: B. C. Gowrishankar
- Screenplay by: B. C. Gowrishankar
- Story by: B. C. Gowrishankar
- Produced by: Sa Ra Govindu; S. V. Prasad
- Starring: Ambareesh; Gouthami
- Cinematography: B. C. Gowrishankar
- Edited by: A. Subramanyam
- Music by: L. Vaidyanathan
- Distributed by: Gayathri Chitralaya
- Release date: 30 March 1988
- Running time: 145 minutes
- Country: India
- Language: Kannada

Elu Suttina Kote is a 1988 Indian Kannada-language film written and directed by B. C. Gowrishankar, starring Ambareesh and Gouthami. Ramesh Aravind, Sadashiva Brahmavar, Sundarakrishna Urs, Devaraj, Sunil Raoh, and Kavya appear in supporting roles. The film enjoys cult classic status in the Kannada cinema industry. The core plot is based on the Russian novel Crime and Punishment by Fyodor Dostoevsky.

== Cast ==
- Ambareesh
- Gouthami
- Ramesh Aravind
- Sundarakrishna Urs
- Nagesh Kashyap
- Shankar Rao
- Devaraj
- Sadashiva Brahmavar
- Honnavalli Krishna
- Mandeep Roy
- Kavya
- Sunil Raoh

== Production ==
In an interview, Ambareesh said that his character in Elu Suttina Kote had a lot of scope for performance.

== Soundtrack ==
The music for the film was composed by carnatic musician L. Vaidyanathan.

Elu Suttina Kote

Soundtrack album by L. Vaidyanathan
- Released: 1987
- Genre: Feature film soundtrack

Track #	Song	Singer(s)	Duration
1	"Eno Maadalu"	S. P. Balasubrahmanyam	
2	"Santasa Araluva Samaya"	S. P. Balasubrahmanyam, Rathnamala Prakash	
3	"Antarangada Hoobanake"	S. P. Balasubrahmanyam	
4	"Ee Shrusti"	Vani Jairam, S. P. Balasubrahmanyam	

== Reception ==
The Hindu listed this film alongside five other films for which Ambareesh earned critical acclaim for his acting.
