= Kunthi Puthra =

- VCD cover
- Directed by: Vijay
- Written by: Vasanth Kunigal (dialogues)
- Screenplay by: Vijay; Srinivas Babu
- Story by: Vijay
- Produced by: Vijay
- Starring: Vishnuvardhan; Shashikumar; Sonakshi; Rajanand
- Cinematography: T. Surendra Reddy
- Edited by: K. Narasaiah
- Music by: Vijayanand
- Production company: Sri Vaishnodevi Productions
- Distributed by: Sri Vaishnodevi Productions
- Release date: 8 March 1994
- Running time: 128 min
- Country: India
- Language: Kannada

Kunthi Puthra is a 1994 Indian Kannada-language film co-written, produced, and directed by Vijay. The film stars Vishnuvardhan, Shashikumar, Sonakshi and Rajanand in lead roles. This was the debut movie of actress Sonakshi. The film had musical score by Vijayanand.

== Plot ==
Surya is a gangster who works for a gang leader. Surya is very obedient for his Master. One day his Master gave him task to save a girl named Mala from Brothel.

== Cast ==
- Vishnuvardhan as Surya / Ravi
- Shashikumar as Chandru
- Sonakshi as Mala
- Rajanand
- Mukhyamantri Chandru
- Sudheer
- Ramesh Bhat
- M. S. Umesh
- Pandari Bai
- Rekha Prakash
- Kalashree
- Rathnakar
- Dingri Nagaraj
- Sihikahi Chandru
- B. K. Shankar
- Mandeep Roy
- M. S. Karanth
- Chikkanna
- Srishailan
- Ramanand
- Master Anand

== Music ==
Soundtrack was composed by Vijayanand.

- "Amma Yennalu" - S. P. Balasubrahmanyam
- "Dinga Danga Dinga" - Manjula Gururaj
- "Ee Prema" - S. P. Balasubrahmanyam, K. S. Chithra
- "Ee Prema Patho" - S. P. Balasubrahmanyam, K. S. Chithra
- "Nammura Siridevi" - S. P. Balasubrahmanyam, K. S. Chithra
- "Pappi Kode" - S. P. Balasubrahmanyam, K. S. Chithra
