= Anuraga Aralithu =

1986 Kannada film by M.S. Rajashekar

- Poster
- Directed by: M. S. Rajashekar
- Screenplay by: Chi. Udayashankar
- Based on: Anuragada Anthahpura by H. G. Radhadevi
- Produced by: M. S. Puttaswamy
- Starring: Rajkumar; Madhavi; Geetha
- Cinematography: V. K. Kannan
- Edited by: P. Bhaktavatsalam
- Music by: Upendra Kumar
- Production company: Bhargavi Art Movies
- Release date: 21 May 1986
- Country: India
- Language: Kannada

Anuraga Aralithu ( transl. Love blooms) is a 1986 Indian Kannada-language film directed by M. S. Rajashekar. It is based on the Kannada novel Anuragada Anthahpura written by H. G. Radhadevi. The film was produced by M. S. Puttaswamy. The film stars Rajkumar, Madhavi and Geetha. The film's score and soundtrack were composed by Upendra Kumar to the lyrics of Chi. Udayashankar, who also wrote the screenplay.

The film was highly successful at the box office with a theatrical run of about 50 weeks. It was later remade in seven other languages – in Tamil and Telugu as Mannan and Gharana Mogudu (both in 1992), in Hindi as Laadla (1994), in Sinhala as Mal Hathai (1996), in Odia as Sindura Nuhein Khela Ghara (2002), in Bengali as Jamaibabu Jindabad (2001) in India, and as Shami Strir Juddho (2002) in Bangladesh.

This was the first Kannada movie to be remade in Odia, Bengali, Bangladeshi Bengali and Sinhala. This was also the first Kannada movie to be remade in two foreign languages. With the remakes of this movie, Rajkumar became the first Indian actor whose movies were remade more than 50 times and also the first Indian actor whose movies were remade in nine other languages. This was the first Indian movie to be remade in seven other languages.

== Plot ==
The film begins with Ashadevi being announced as the leading industrialist in India. Ashadevi is a rich and arrogant lady and rules her company with an iron hand. Shankar is a kind-hearted man who works as a Chief Mechanic in Bombay. Shankar learns that his mother is paralyzed, and so, quits his job in Bombay to look after his ailing mother, who lives in Nanjangud. His family friend, Papanna, recommends him to meet a renowned businessman for his job, and Shankar heads to meet him.

On the way, an elderly man, Mohan Rao, is beaten up by several men, because his daughter fired them from their jobs. Shankar saves and hospitalizes him, and finds out that Mohan Rao is the businessman he intended to meet. After a few days, Shankar comes to Mohan Rao's house to see him. Mohan Rao asks Shankar to ask something as a gift as he shows the letter of Papanna. Mohan Rao provides a job for Shankar in his company upon seeing this letter. This infuriates Ashadevi, who attempts to get him fired from his job in several ways in the office.

Shankar befriends Ashadevi's secretary, Uma. A warm, kind-hearted person, Uma loves Shankar but she hides it from him. One day, Shankar learns of the problems employees families suffer from, and asks Ashadevi to solve this problem. Initially, she refuses to do so, but upon realizing that Shankar saved lakhs of rupees in finding out the duplicate dispatched stocks, she does so. When Shankar notices a manager treat his employees with harsh language, he demands the manager to apologize the workers, causing Ashadevi to dismisses Shankar from his job. Shankar saves her from an accident involving a molten iron furnace on the way back, but she slaps him for hugging her. Shankar slaps her in her chamber in return. As a revenge, Ashadevi decides to marry Shankar, and asks her father to help her do so. Shankar initially refuses to marry, but upon his mother's repeated requests, he agrees to marry, much to Uma's disappointment, for she comes to Shankar's house for the same.

Ashadevi expects Shankar to remain at home after marriage, but Shankar continues to work, and this foils all her plans to avenge him. Ashadevi refuses to announce bonuses to workers in her company, which agitates all workers including Shankar and redirects them to an indefinite hunger strike, including Shankar. Mohan Rao realizes that his company's image is at stake and takes over as the chairman. Ashadevi is angered by this move, thinking that she has lost to Shankar. After the strike, While Shankar is eating his first gulp, Ashadevi starts humiliating Shankar in front of his mother without knowing her presence. Shankar's mother learns of their bitter relationship and dies immediately, out of guilt. Ashadevi shoots herself with a revolver, feeling remorseful for her actions, although Shankar and Uma attempt to stop it. They rush her to a hospital, where Uma asks Shankar to forgive Ashadevi for her actions. Upon regaining consciousness, Ashadevi apologizes to Shankar, who forgives her.

== Cast ==
- Dr. Rajkumar as Shankar, a mechanic
- Madhavi as Asha Devi, Shankar's wife
- Geetha as Uma
- Pandari Bai as Shankar's mother
- K. S. Ashwath as Mohan Rao, Asha's father
- Thoogudeepa Srinivas
- Shringar Nagaraj
- Sadashiva Brahmavar as General Manager Lakshman Rao
- Satish as Rajmohan
- Parvathavani
- Kunigal Ramanath
- Shani Mahadevappa
- Ashwath Narayan
- Shivaprakash

== Remakes ==
The movie was remade into seven languages.

| Year | Film | Language | Ref. |
|---|---|---|---|
| 1992 | Mannan | Tamil | |
| 1992 | Gharana Mogudu | Telugu | |
| 1994 | Laadla | Hindi | |
| 1996 | Mal Hathai | Sinhala | |
| 2001 | Jamaibabu Jindabad | Bengali | |
| 2002 | Sindura Nuhein Khela Ghara | Odia | |
| 2002 | Shami Strir Juddho | Bangladeshi Bengali | |

== Soundtrack ==
Anuraga Aralithu

Soundtrack album by Upendra Kumar
- Released: 1986
- Genre: Feature film soundtrack
- Label: Sangeetha
- Director: Upendra Kumar

Upendra Kumar composed the background score for the film and the soundtracks. Lyrics for the soundtracks were penned by Chi. Udaya Shankar. The album consists of five soundtracks.

Tracklist
| No. | Title | Lyrics | Singer(s) | Length |
|---|---|---|---|---|
| 1. | "Ganga Yamuna Sangama" | Chi. Udaya Shankar | Dr. Rajkumar, S. Janaki | 4:21 |
| 2. | "Shreekanta Vishakanta" | Chi. Udaya Shankar | Dr. Rajkumar | 4:30 |
| 3. | "Nee Nadedare Sogasu" | Chi. Udaya Shankar | Dr. Rajkumar | 4:05 |
| 4. | "Saarthakavayithu" | Chi. Udaya Shankar | Dr. Rajkumar | 2:56 |
| 5. | "Beesadiru Thangaali" | Chi. Udaya Shankar | Vani Jairam | 4:02 |
