= Kattula Kondayya =

1985 Telugu film directed by S. B. Chakravarthy

- Theatrical release poster
- Directed by: S. B. Chakravarthy
- Screenplay by: Satyanand
- Story by: S. B. Chakravarthy
- Produced by: Kella Rama Swamy
- Starring: Nandamuri Balakrishna; Sumalatha
- Cinematography: Kannappa
- Edited by: D. Venkataratnam
- Music by: Chakravarthy
- Production company: Prasanna Arts
- Release date: 11 October 1985
- Running time: 139 minutes
- Country: India
- Language: Telugu

Kattula Kondayya is a 1985 Telugu-language action film directed by S. B. Chakravarthy. It stars Nandamuri Balakrishna, Sumalatha, and music is scored by K. Chakravarthy. Satyanand wrote the dialogues and screenplay for the story written by S. B. Chakravarthy.

== Cast ==
- Nandamuri Balakrishna as Kiran
- Sumalatha as Jyothi
- Satyanarayana as Narayana
- Rajendra Prasad as Inspector Vijay
- Gummadi as Dharma Rao
- Gollapudi Maruti Rao as MLA Madhava Rao
- Nutan Prasad as Prasad Rao
- Bhima Raju as Bheemudu
- Narra Venkateswara Rao as Doctor
- Hema Chandra as Jailor
- KK Sarma as Editor
- Chidatala Appa Rao as Chemcha
- Silk Smitha as Item Number
- Subha as Annapurna
- Jaya Vijaya as Madhava Rao's wife
- Lalitha Mani

== Music ==
Kattula Kondaiah

Soundtrack album by Chakravarthy
- Released: 1985
- Genre: Feature film soundtrack
- Length: 22:00
- Label: AVM Audio
- Producer: Chakravarthy

Chakravarthy chronology
Bhale Thammudu (1985)	Kattula Kondaiah (1985)	Pattabhishekam (1985)

Music was composed by Chakravarthy. Lyrics were written by Veturi. Music released on AVM Audio Company.

S. No.	Song title	Singers	length
1	"Avvayi Chuvvayi"	S. P. Balasubrahmanyam, P. Susheela	3:50
2	"Musuruku Vachindomabbu"	S. P. Balasubrahmanyam, P. Susheela	4:25
3	"Veeraga Unnade Vijrumbhanam"	S. P. Balasubrahmanyam, P. Susheela	4:30
4	"Lightu Guchukuntondi"	Madhavapeddi Ramesh, S. P. Sailaja	5:05
5	"Naa Kattonka Chusuko"	S. P. Balasubrahmanyam, P. Susheela	4:05
