= Aata Bombata =

- DVD cover
- Directed by: B. C. Gowrishankar
- Screenplay by: Veerappa Maralavadi; B. C. Gowrishankar
- Story by: Veerappa Maralavadi
- Produced by: A. Keshava; A. Narasimha; D. K. Keshava Prasad
- Starring: Shankar Nag; Srilatha
- Cinematography: B. C. Gowrishankar
- Edited by: P. Bhaktavatsalam
- Music by: Hamsalekha
- Production company: Padmavathi Art Productions
- Release date: 1990
- Running time: 121 minutes
- Country: India
- Language: Kannada

Aata Bombata is a 1990 Indian Kannada language film directed by B. C. Gowrishankar starring Shankar Nag and Srilatha. The supporting cast features Sudheer, Ramakrishna, Mysore Lokesh, Ramesh Bhat and Thriveni. The dialogues in the film were written by Veerappa Maralavadi and Upendra; the latter would go on to become a popular director and actor in Kannada cinema.

== Cast ==
- Shankar Nag as Raaju
- Srilatha as Uma
- Sudheer as Venkatappa
- Ramakrishna as Inspector Vijay
- Mysore Lokesh as Bhatti
- Chindodi Thriveni as Renuka wife of Bhatti
- Ramesh Bhat as Murthy
- Honnavalli Krishna as Mahadevu
- Tennis Krishna as Govinda
- Thoogudeepa Srinivas as Chandrashekharayya
- G. K. Govinda Rao in a cameo appearance
- Sadashiva Brahmavar as Sankajja
- Sudheendra as Devanna

== Soundtrack ==
Hamsalekha composed the music for the soundtracks in the film. The album has four tracks. Lyrics were written by Hamsalekha, Rudramurthy Shastry, and Upendra.

Tracklist
No.	Title	Singer(s)	Length
1.	"Bhale Bhale Aata Bombata"	S. P. Balasubrahmanyam
2.	"Kaalidasanajne Aayithu"	S. P. Balasubrahmanyam, S. Janaki
3.	"Ittaru Ittaru Guri Ittaru"	S. P. Balasubrahmanyam, Manjula Gururaj
4.	"Nodi Seereya Maaye"	Manjula Gururaj
