= Aanewala Pal =

Song by Kishore Kumar

from the album Gol Maal
- Language: Hindi
- Published: 1979
- Composer: R. D. Burman
- Lyricist: Gulzar

"Aanewala Pal" (transl. Coming moment) is an Indian Hindi song from the Bollywood film Gol Maal. The lyrics of the song was written by Gulzar. Kishore Kumar was the playback singer of this song. This song was one of the hit songs sung by Kishore Kumar.

== Picturisation ==
In the film Gol Maal, the song is picturised with Amol Palekar and Bindiya Goswami.

== Awards ==
Gulzar, won a Filmfare Award for Best Lyricist, in 1980, for this song.
