= Nanna Devaru =

- Directed by: B. Mallesh
- Written by: R. Selvaraj
- Produced by: K. S. Ashok
- Starring: Ananth Nag; Sujath Menon; Tiger Prabhakar; K. S. Ashwath
- Cinematography: B. C. Gowrishankar
- Edited by: P. Bhaktavatsalam
- Music by: Rajan–Nagendra
- Production company: Rajeshwari Bhagya Kalamandira Combines
- Release date: 1982
- Running time: 133 minutes
- Country: India
- Language: Kannada

Nanna Devaru is a 1982 Kannada-language film, directed by B. Mallesh and produced by K. S. Ashok. The story was written by R. Selvaraj. The film stars Ananth Nag, Sujatha (in her Kannada debut), Tiger Prabhakar and K. S. Ashwath. Actress Jayanthi appeared in a brief cameo role. The film's score and songs were composed by Rajan–Nagendra, whilst the cinematography was by B. C. Gowrishankar.

== Cast ==
- Anant Nag as Gopal
- Sujatha as Radha
- Jayanthi as stage actor (cameo)
- Tiger Prabhakar as Prabhakar
- K. S. Ashwath as Dr. Ranganath
- Vajramuni as actor
- Musuri Krishnamurthy as Dronacharya
- Dinesh as sub-inspector
- Sundar Raj as Murthy
- K. Vijaya
- Jayamalini
- B. Hanumanthachar
- Dingri Nagaraj
- Bheema Rao
- Bhatti Mahadevappa
- Police Mahadevappa
- Pranava Murthy
- M. S. Umesh
- Sharapanjara Iyengar
- Mandeep Roy as car driver
- B. Jaya

== Soundtrack ==
The music was composed by Rajan–Nagendra duo, with lyrics by Chi. Udaya Shankar.

Track listing
No.	Title	Singer(s)	Length
1.	"Dundu Mallige Mathadeya"	S. P. Balasubrahmanyam	04:12
2.	"Manasu Ondada Mele"	S. P. Balasubrahmanyam, S. Janaki	04:33
3.	"Baaro Baaro Muddina Nalla"	S. P. Balasubrahmanyam, S. Janaki	04:29
