= Shashi Kumar =

Indian politician

Member of the Lok Sabha for Chitradurga
- In office 10 October 1999 – 6 February 2004
- Preceded by: C. P. Mudalagiriyappa
- Succeeded by: N. Y. Hanumanthappa

Personal details
- Born: Shashikumar Nayak; 2 December 1965 (age 60) Bengaluru, Karnataka, India
- Party: Bharatiya Janata Party (2022–present)
- Other political affiliations: Indian National Congress (2006–2022) Janata Dal (Secular) (2004–2006); Janata Dal (United) (–2004)
- Spouse: Saraswati
- Children: 2, including Akshith
- Occupation: Actor; Politician

Shashikumar Nayak (born 2 December 1965), professionally known as Shashi Kumar (also spelled Shashikumar), is an Indian actor and politician who rose to prominence in Kannada cinema during the late 1980s and 1990s. Starting his acting career in villainous role in Chiranjeevi Sudhakara (1988) and subsequent supporting roles in few films, Shashi Kumar played his first lead role in Baare Nanna Muddina Rani (1990). Celebrated for his energetic dancing and onscreen charisma, he earned the affectionate title “Supreme Hero” from fans.

Beyond Kannada, his filmography includes few Tamil, Telugu, and Hindi films, including a notable role as Rajinikanth’s brother in the blockbuster Baashha (1995). Some of his notable roles came with Rani Maharani (1990), Policena Hendthi (1990), Readymade Ganda (1991), Kitturina Huli (1991), Edurmaneli Ganda Pakkadmaneli Hendthi (1992), Muddina Maava (1993), Mutthanna (1994), Kunthi Puthra (1994), Ganeshana Galate (1995), Habba (1999) and Yajamana (2000). Post 2000, he switched to supporting roles and starred in several multi-starrer films.

After a prolific film career with over 100 titles, Shashi Kumar entered politics, serving as Member of Parliament for Chitradurga in the 13th Lok Sabha (1999–2004) and subsequently joining various political parties.

== Acting career ==
Shashi Kumar's first released film was Chiranjeevi Sudhakar starring Raghavendra Rajkumar. In 1989 he became popular with Yuddha Kaanda starring V. Ravichandran and Poonam Dhillon and C.B.I Shankar with Shankar Nag. In 1990 two successful films Rani Maharani and Baare Nanna Muddina Rani established him as a top hero of Kannada cinema. Shashi Kumar and Malashri, who acted together in several hit films together are considered one among the all-time popular pairs of Kannada cinema. He was also paired with actresses Sudha Rani, Tara, Mahalakshmi, Soundarya, Sithara and Shruti.

He was injured a car accident near the Bangalore Turf Club in 1998. The surgeries altered his looks and offers for lead roles from big banners stopped coming his way. For a few years, he starred in supporting roles in multi-starrers like Yajamana, Habba, Kanasugara, Snehaloka and Yaarige Saluthe Sambala. He later decided to enter politics.

== Political career ==
He was a member of the 13th Lok Sabha representing Chitradurga and contesting on a Janata Dal (United) ticket. He has successfully contested and won the Member of Parliament elections for Chitradurga constituency. He joined the Indian National Congress in 2006.

== Selected filmography ==
=== Kannada films ===
Year	Film	Role	Notes
1988	Chiranjeevi Sudhakar	Avinash	
1989	Yuddha Kaanda	Vicky	
1989	Indrajith		
1989	C.B.I. Shankar	Santosh	
1989	Premagni		
1990	Challenge Gopalakrishna		Cameo
1990	Baare Nanna Muddina Rani		
1990	Mruthyunjaya	Sundara	
1990	Rudra Thaandava		
1990	Rani Maharani		
1990	Policena Hendthi		
1990	S. P. Sangliyana Part 2		
1990	Trinetra	Vinod	
1990	Wanted		
1990	Ashoka Chakra	Shashi	
1991	Ibbaru Hendira Muddina Police	Krishnaiah/Anand	Dual role
1991	Anatha Rakshaka		
1991	Maneli Ili Beedeeli Huli		
1991	Readymade Ganda		
1991	Kollur Kala		
1991	Kitturina Huli		
1991	Gandanige Takka Hendathi		
1991	Sakalakalavallabha		
1991	Kalla Malla		
1991	Keralida Kesari	Tejaswi	
1992	Kanasina Rani	Raja	
1992	Edurmaneli Ganda Pakkadmaneli Hendthi	Bava	
1992	Hosa Kalla Hale Kulla		
1992	Aathma Bandhana		
1992	Gandharva		
1992	Mallige Hoove		
1992	Baa Nanna Preethisu		
1992	Hendthire Hushar		
1993	Sarkarakke Saval		
1993	Shrungara Raja		
1993	Muddina Maava		
1993	Kempaiah IPS		
1993	Dharma Peeta		
1993	Kalyana Rekhe		
1993	Bhagavan Sri Saibaba	Eshwara	
1994	Alexander		
1994	Mutthanna	Police Inspector	
1994	Sammilana		
1994	Kunthi Puthra		
1994	Swathi		
1995	Nighata		
1995	Thumbida Mane		
1995	Ganeshana Galate	Ganesha	
1995	Rowdy		
1995	Stri		
1995	Shubha Lagna		
1996	Muddina Aliya		
1996	Nirbandha	Arjun	
1997	Laxmi Mahalaxmi		
1997	Balida Mane		
1997	Baalina Daari		
1998	Doni Sagali		
1998	Baaro Nanna Muddina Krishna		
1999	Khalayanaka		
1999	Habba	Shashi	
1999	Snehaloka	Shashi	
1999	Coolie Raja		
1999	Sundarapurusha		
2000	Yarige Salatte Sambla	Ramesh	
2000	Yajamana	Subramanya	
2001	Lankesha		
2001	Bahala Chennagide	Shivaji	
2001	Namma Samsara Ananda Sagara		
2001	Haalappa		
2001	Kanasugara	Ajay	
2002	Baanallu Neene Bhuviyallu Neene		
2003	Ree Swalpa Bartheera		
2004	Sahukara	Raja	
2004	Hendthi Andre Hendthi		
2006	Pandavaru		
2007	Masti		
2008	Bandhu Balaga		
2008	Slum Bala	Shantaram	
2010	Lift Kodla	Police Inspector	
2010	Naradha Vijaya		
2010	Rame Gowda vs Krishna Reddy	Rame Gowda	
2011	Take It Easy		
2012	Kranthiveera Sangolli Rayanna	Channabasava	
2013	Galaate		
2014	Power	Police Commissioner	
2016	Shivayogi Sri Puttayyajja		
2019	Kurukshetra	Dharmaraya	
2022	Bairagee	Prakash Sarang	
2023	Vidhi (Article) 370		
2024	Krishnam Pranaya Sakhi	Shashiraj	
2025	September 10		
2025	Congratulations Brother		
2026	Terror		
2026	Bengaluru Inn		

=== Other language films ===
Year	Film	Role	Language	Notes
1990	Manasu Mamtha		Telugu	
1991	Veetla Eli Velila Puli		Tamil	Guest role in song "Nayaram"
1991	Ashwini	Chandu	Telugu	
1993	Kokkoroko		Telugu	
1993	Prema Samaram		Telugu	
1995	Baashha	Shiva	Tamil	
1996	Amma Durgamma		Telugu	
1996	Maa Inti Aadapaduchu		Telugu	

Television

- Anna Thangi (Star Suvarna)
