= Gandu Sidigundu =

- VCD cover
- Directed by: M. S. Rajashekar
- Written by: M. D. Sundar
- Screenplay by: M. D. Sundar
- Produced by: S. A. Srinivas
- Starring: Ambareesh; Malashri; Thoogudeepa Srinivas
- Cinematography: B. C. Gowrishankar
- Edited by: S. Manohar
- Music by: Upendra Kumar
- Production company: Sri Vahini Cine Combines
- Release date: 13 August 1991
- Running time: 128 minutes
- Country: India
- Language: Kannada

Gandu Sidigundu is a 1991 Indian Kannada-language action film directed by M. S. Rajashekar, written by M. D. Sundar and produced by S. A. Srinivas. The film stars Ambareesh and Malashri. The film had cinematography by B. C. Gowrishankar and the dialogues and lyrics were written by Chi. Udaya Shankar.

The film's music was composed by Upendra Kumar and the audio was launched on the Lahari Music banner.

== Cast ==
- Ambareesh
- Malashri
- Thoogudeepa Srinivas
- Shivaram
- M. S. Rajashekar
- Aravind
- M. P. Shankar
- Ashwath Narayan
- Agro Chikkanna
- Kishori Ballal
- Malathi
- Killankera

== Soundtrack ==
The music of the film was composed by Upendra Kumar, with lyrics by Chi. Udaya Shankar and Sri Ranga.

Track listing
No.	Title	Lyrics	Singer(s)	Length
1.	"Dhanikanigu Kadu"	Sri Ranga	S. P. Balasubrahmanyam
2.	"Hosa Bhaashe"	Chi. Udaya Shankar	S. P. Balasubrahmanyam, Manjula Gururaj
3.	"Ehtake Yochane"	Chi. Udaya Shankar	Manjula Gururaj
4.	"Ee Raathri Hotthalli"	Chi. Udaya Shankar	Manjula Gururaj, Vishnu
5.	"Hatinolage Photo"	Chi. Udaya Shankar	S. P. Balasubrahmanyam, Manjula Gururaj
