= Kalyana Rekhe =

- Directed by: M. S. Rajashekar
- Written by: Sai Suthe
- Screenplay by: T N Narasimhan; Pal Sudarshan
- Based on: Novel by Sai Suthe
- Produced by: M. Sadanand
- Starring: Malashri; Shashikumar; Doddanna
- Cinematography: Mallikarjun
- Edited by: S. Manohar
- Music by: Hamsalekha
- Production company: Yamini Pictures
- Release date: 1993
- Running time: 136 minutes
- Country: India
- Language: Kannada

Kalyana Rekhe is a 1993 Indian Kannada-language film directed by M. S. Rajashekar and produced by M. Sadanand under the banner Yamini Pictures. The film stars Malashri and Shashikumar. The supporting cast features Shubha, K. S. Ashwath, Thoogudeepa Srinivas, Girija Lokesh, Tennis Krishna and Doddanna. Acclaimed director S. K. Bhagavan was also a part of star cast in supporting role. The film was based on the novel written by Sai Suthe

== Cast ==
- Malashri as Sunitha
- Shashikumar as Prashanth
- Sundar Krishna Urs as Nagesh, Prashanth's father
- Shubha
- Thoogudeepa Srinivas
- Doddanna
- K. S. Ashwath
- S. K. Bhagavan as Koramangala Kodandapani
- Girija Lokesh
- Ashalatha
- M. S. Umesh

== Soundtrack ==
Kalyana Rekhe

Soundtrack album by Hamsalekha
- Genre: Feature film soundtrack
- Language: Kannada
- Label: Sangeetha

Hamsalekha composed the music for the film and wrote lyrics and the soundtracks. The album consists of six soundtracks.

Track list
| No. | Title | Lyrics | Singer(s) | Length |
|---|---|---|---|---|
| 1. | "Marketinalli" | Hamsalekha | Rajesh Krishnan, Manjula Gururaj | 04:58 |
| 2. | "Kalyana Rekhe" | Hamsalekha | S. P. Balasubrahmanyam, Manjula Gururaj | 06:00 |
| 3. | "O Chaitra Nee" | Hamsalekha | S. P. Balasubrahmanyam, Manjula Gururaj | 04:23 |
| 4. | "Nagundare Aluthaale" | Hamsalekha | Manjula Gururaj | 04:35 |
| 5. | "Oh Maina Oh Sakhi" | Hamsalekha | S. P. Balasubrahmanyam, Manjula Gururaj | 04:47 |
| 6. | "Dayamadi Mannisu" | Hamsalekha | S. P. Balasubrahmanyam | 05:01 |
| Total length: | | | | 22:39 |
