= M. S. Rajashekar =

Indian film director

- Born: Mysore Subbanna Rajasekhar
- Died: 29 October 2018 (aged 75); Bangalore, Karnataka, India
- Occupation: Film director
- Years active: 1985–2006

M. S. Rajashekar (died 29 October 2018) was an Indian Kannada film director based in Bangalore. He made his directorial debut with Dhruva Thare starring Rajkumar which earned the Karnataka State Award for Second Best Film. His second movie Anuraga Aralithu was remade in Tamil, Telugu and Hindi. He went on to make successful films like Ratha Sapthami and Nanjundi Kalyana.

Most of his films were either remakes or adapted from novels. He is credited with having brought nativity element in remakes since he is known only to retain the core storyline in the remakes. He is the second director after Singeetam Srinivasa Rao to direct matinee idol Rajkumar and his two sons. He also has the distinction of having directed Shiva Rajkumar in highest no. of movies - 14 - including his second and third movie (which earned him the title Hat-trick Hero) and also Raghavendra Rajkumar in highest no. of movies -8 (including his second and third movie). His movie Kanasina Rani earned Malashri a title of same name.

== Personal life ==
He is the son of make up artist Subbanna. Rajasekhar's son Raghavendra (Dharani) made his directorial debut with Baalashiva (2003) and went on to direct Dhool (2011).

== Career ==
He started his career as a clap boy for the film Kasturi Nivasa. After assisting eminent directors such as Vijay, K. S. L. Swamy, V. Somashekhar, Siddalingaiah and Singeetham Srinivasa Rao, Rajashekar made his directorial debut with Dhruva Thare starring Rajkumar which became hit. His second film Anuraga Aralithu was also successful. He directed Rajkumar's son Shivarajkumar in Ratha Sapthami and Mana Mecchida Hudugi. Both films alongside Anand became successful and earned Shivrajkumar the tag of "Hat Trick Hero". Rajasekhar again directed him in films during 1980s like Ade Raaga Ade Haadu and Aasegobba Meesegobba with former being average grosser and latter being a super hit. He introduced Rajkumar's second son in the leading role in family comedy Nanjundi Kalyana which also marked the debut of actress Malashree. The film became a successful venture which led the cast and crew to collaborate with Gajapathi Garvabhanga in a similar genre. Hrudaya Haadithu and Mannina Doni were both films which starred Ambareesh and were adapted from novels which were successful. Both films featured Ambareesh in a soft natured character as opposed to action roles which he was playing up to that part of career. Midida Shruti and Muthanna which he again directed with Shivaraj did well. After the average success of Mana midiyuthu, Rajasekhar after four years sabbatical returned with Hrudaya Hrudaya, a romantic film with Shivarajkumar and Ramesh Aravind which was an average grosser but was well known for the song "O Premada". However, in the later part of Rajasekhar's career in 2000s, he directed mostly remakes with Yaarige Saluthe Sambala and Dakota Express being only successful ventures while his subsequent ventures like Vijayasimha, Pakkadmane Hudugi and Ravi Shastri became failures. Ravi Shastri was the last film he had directed before his retirement.

== Death ==
Rajasekhar died on 29 October 2018 at the age of 75 due to breathing problems.

== Filmography ==
Year	Film	Notes
1985	Dhruva Thare	
1986	Anuraga Aralithu	
1986	Ratha Sapthami	
1987	Manamecchida Hudugi	
1989	Nanjundi Kalyana	
1989	Gajapathi Garvabhanga	
1989	Ade Raaga Ade Haadu	
1990	Aasegobba Meesegobba	
1990	Anukoolakkobba Ganda	
1991	Modada Mareyalli	
1991	Hrudaya Haadithu	
1991	Gandu Sidigundu	
1991	Halli Rambhe Belli Bombe	
1991	Sutradhara	
1992	Mannina Doni	
1992	Kanasina Rani	
1992	Midida Shruthi	
1992	Purushottama	
1993	Chirabandhavya	
1993	Kalyana Rekhe	
1993	Navibbaru Namagibbaru	
1994	Mutthanna	
1995	Savyasachi	
1995	Mana Midiyithu	
1996	Shivaranjani	
1999	Hrudaya Hrudaya	
2000	Yaarige Saluthe Sambala	
2001	Sundarakanda	
2002	Bahala Chennagide	
2002	Manase O Manase	
2002	Dakota Express	
2003	Vijayasimha	
2003	Nanna Hendthi Maduve	
2004	Pakkadmane Hudugi	
2006	Ravi Shastri	co-director
