= Thoogudeepa Srinivas =

Indian actor

- Born: 17 April 1943
- Died: 16 October 1995 (aged 52)
- Occupation: Actor
- Spouse: Meena (m. 1973)
- Children: 3, including Darshan

Mysore Srinivas (17 April 1943 – 16 October 1995), known by his stage name Thoogudeepa Srinivas was an Indian actor who appeared in Kannada films and is remembered for his portrayal of negative-shaded characters. He is the father of actor, Darshan and film director Dinakar.

== Early life ==
Srinivas was born to Muniswami and Parvathamma on 17 April 1943 as their fourth son. He had eight siblings. He lost his parents at a young age. Right from his childhood days, Srinivas was interested in theatre and cinema and was a regular participant in his school and college plays. During one of these plays, he caught the eye of another theatre artist M. P. Shankar, whom he later went on to star with in many Kannada films. Srinivas then became a regular member of Shankar's camp and had to discontinue his education during his pursuing of a Bachelor of Science from St. Philomena's College, Mysore.

== Career ==
Srinivas made his film debut in 1966 with K. S. L. Swamy's Kannada film Thoogudeepa. His debut film became part of his professional identity as he was referred to from then on as Thoogudeepa Srinivas. He went on to appear in many other successful films such as Mayor Muthanna, Bangaarada Panjara, Gandhada Gudi, Kalla Kulla, Vasantha Lakshmi and Sahasa Simha. He appeared in many films as a villain with Rajkumar as the lead actor and his "partners in crime" included other popular actors such as Vajramuni, Doddanna and Dheerendra Gopal.

Srinivas appeared in an important role in the 1984 film Ramapurada Ravana. He received appreciation for his roles in films such as Sipayi Ramu, Giri Kanye and Bhagyavantharu.

== Personal life ==
Srinivas married Meena on 15 November 1973 in Ponnampet, Kodagu. The couple have three children together — Darshan, Dinakar and Divya. Darshan is a popular actor in Kannada cinema and Dinakar is a film director.

Srinivas suffered from diabetes and kidney ailment. His wife Meena donated one of her kidneys to him. However, he died due to a massive heart attack on 16 October 1995, aged 52.

== Partial filmography ==
- Mane Katti Nodu (1966) as doctor
- Thoogudeepa (1966)
- Mayor Muthanna (1969) as Sudhakar
- Modala Rathri (1970) as Police Inspector
- Sipayi Ramu (1971) as Mangal Singh
- Bhale Adrushtavo Adrushta (1971)
- Bhale Huchcha (1972) as Shivakumar
- Gandhada Gudi (1973) as Kunju Ahmed
- Bhakta Kumbara (1974)
- Bangaarada Panjara (1974)
- Daari Tappida Maga (1975)
- Mayura (1975)...Kotwal
- Bahaddur Gandu (1976)
- Badavara Bandhu (1976)
- Kanasu Nanasu (1976)
- Giri Kanye (1977)
- Sanaadi Appanna (1977) as Shivaraya
- Babruvahana (1977) as Takshaka
- Singaporenalli Raja Kulla (1978)...Junie
- Shankar Guru (1978)...Madanlal
- Operation Diamond Racket (1978)...Vikram Singh
- Thayige Thakka Maga (1978)...Robert
- Nanobba Kalla...Joginder
- Vijay Vikram (1979)...Daku Badri
- Preethi Madu Thamashe Nodu (1979)...Harish
- Auto Raja (1980)...Bhaskar Rao
- Aarada Gaaya (1980)
- Ondu Hennu Aaru Kannu (1980)...Rudrayya/Santosh
- Point Parimala (1980)...Dharmaprakash
- Vasantha Geetha (1980)...Vishwanath
- Kulla Kulli (1980)...trainer in gymnasium (cameo)
- Nee Nanna Gellalare (1981)...Yogi
- Mooroovare Vajragalu (1982)...Bhima
- Sahasa Simha (1982)...Peter
- Khadeema Kallaru (1982)
- Nee Nanna Gellalare (1982)
- Jimmy Gallu (1982)
- Kaviratna Kalidasa (1983)
- Bhakta Prahlada (1983)...Hiranyaksha
- Hosa Theerpu (1983)
- Kaamana Billu (1983)
- Benkiya Bale (1983)
- Chandi Chamundi (1983) as K. Duggappa
- Apoorva Sangama (1984)...Vishwanath
- Samayada Gombe (1984) as Puttappa
- Dhruva Thare (1985)as Pavan Kumar
- Ade Kannu (1985)...Mahesh
- Vajra Mushti (1985)...Vishwanath
- Jwaalamukhi (1985)...Ratanlal
- Anuraga Aralithu (1986)
- Africadalli Sheela (1986)
- Aparadhi Nanalla (1986)...Madan
- Ondu Muttina Kathe (1987)...Bollanna
- Anthima Theerpu (1987)...Vincent
- Sheela (1987; Hindi)
- Devatha Manushya (1988)
- Vijaya Khadga (1988)...Basavaraj
- Anjada Gandu (1988)...Major Rudrappa
- Arjun (1988)
- Chiranjeevi Sudhakar (1988)
- Ramanna Shamanna (1988)
- Nanjundi Kalyana (1989)
- Hongkongnalli Agent Amar (1989)
- Parashuram (1989)...M. Shivaraj
- Raja Simha (1989)...Rudrappa
- Aata Bombata (1990)
- Gandu Sidigundu (1991)...Shyam
- Halli Meshtru (1992)....as chairman
- Jeevana Chaitra (1992)...Narasinga Raya
- Kanasina Rani (1992)
- Mannina Doni (1992)...Veerabhadra
- Bharjari Gandu (1992)
- Aakasmika (1993)...Kaatayya "Kaatesh"
- Ananda Jyothi (1993)
- Anuragada Alegalu (1993)
- Kalyana Rekhe (1993)
- Gold Medal (1994) as Police Commissioner Somashekar
- Indian (1994)
- Mutthanna (1994)
- Savyasachi (1995)
