= Bhale Thammudu (1985 film) =

1985 film

- Theatrical release poster
- Directed by: Paruchuri Brothers
- Written by: Paruchuri Brothers
- Produced by: Satyanarayana; Suryanarayana
- Starring: Nandamuri Balakrishna; Urvashi
- Cinematography: P. Devaraj
- Edited by: Babu
- Music by: Chakravarthy
- Production company: Satya Chitra
- Release date: 27 April 1985
- Country: India
- Language: Telugu

Bhale Thammudu (transl. Well done, younger brother) is a 1985 Indian Telugu-language action drama film, produced by Satyanarayana, Suryanarayana under Satya Chitra banner and directed by Paruchuri brothers. It stars Nandamuri Balakrishna, Urvasi and music scored by Chakravarthy.

== Cast ==
- Nandamuri Balakrishna as Inspector Rajendra
- Urvashi as Latha
- N.T. Rama Rao as Nandamuri Taraka Rama Rao
- Gollapudi Maruti Rao as M.L.A. Veeraswamy
- Nutan Prasad as Leela Prasad
- Chandra Mohan as Ravindra
- Siva Krishna as Vidyadhar
- Ranganath as D.S.P. Srinivas
- Prabhakar Reddy as Dada
- Nagesh as Constable Siva Rao
- Rallapalli as Panthulu
- Rajanala as Villain
- Chalapathi Rao as Raju
- Sakshi Ranga Rao as Constable
- Kakarala as Bhaskar Rao
- Raj Varma as Kumar
- Ramji as Bhanu Prasad
- Ali
- Ashwini as Saraswathi
- Prabha as Ravindra's wife
- Jyothi as Neelaveni
- Srilakshmi as Panthulu's wife
- Sharada
- Anuradha as item number
- Jayamalini as item number
- K. R. Vijaya as Rajendra's Fiance

== Soundtrack ==
Bhale Thammudu

Soundtrack album by Chakravarthy
- Released: 1985
- Genre: Feature film soundtrack
- Length: 26:55
- Label: AVM Audio
- Producer: Chakravarthy

Chakravarthy chronology
Bharyabhartala Bhandam (1985)	Bhale Thammudu (1985)	Kattula Kondayya (1985)

Music composed by Chakravarthy. Lyrics were written by Veturi. Music released on AVM Audio Company.

S. No.	Song title	Singers	length
1	"Annagari Alaka"	S. P. Balasubrahmanyam, P. Susheela	4:20
2	"Gaaliki Regina"	Madhavapeddi Ramesh, P. Susheela	4:25
3	"Kondagaali Veestunte"	S. P. Balasubrahmanyam, P. Susheela	4:27
4	"Mansunte Mannichu"	S. P. Balasubrahmanyam, P. Susheela	4:21
5	"Raroyee Maa Clubki"	S. P. Balasubrahmanyam, P. Susheela	4:24
6	"Devudichina Vayasu"	P. Susheela	4:58
