= Readymade Ganda =

- Directed by: Sai Prakash
- Written by: Shankar Bhat
- Screenplay by: Sai Prakash
- Produced by: Vijaya Shankar Bhat; T. R. Srinivasan
- Starring: Shashikumar; Malashri; Hema Choudhary; Mukhyamantri Chandru; Doddanna
- Cinematography: Johnny Lal
- Edited by: K. Narasaiah
- Music by: Upendra Kumar
- Production companies: Devi & Devi Films
- Release date: 17 May 1991
- Running time: 133 minutes
- Country: India
- Language: Kannada

Readymade Ganda is a 1991 Indian Kannada-language romantic comedy film, written by Shankar Bhat and directed by Sai Prakash. The film stars Shashikumar and Malashri.

The film's music was composed by Upendra Kumar and the audio was launched under the Lahari Music banner.

== Cast ==
- Shashikumar
- Malashri
- Hema Choudhary
- Doddanna
- Sihi Kahi Chandru
- Rathasapthami Aravind
- Guru Murthy
- Narasimha Moorthi
- K. D. Venkatesh
- Kunigal Nagabhushan
- M. S. Karanth
- Danny
- Negro Johnny
- M. S. Umesh as Ganapathi
- Ananthrao Maccheri
- Sudha Narasimharaju
- Bank Janardhan
- Mukhyamantri Chandru
- Vaishali Kasaravalli
- Kaminidharan
- Master Sunil

== Soundtrack ==
The music of the film was composed by Upendra Kumar, with lyrics by R. N. Jayagopal.

Track listing
No.	Title	Lyrics	Singer(s)	Length
1.	"Market Maduve Market"	R. N. Jayagopal	Manjula Gururaj
2.	"Chamundi Bettakke"	R. N. Jayagopal	S. P. Balasubrahmanyam, Manjula Gururaj
3.	"Ko Ko Appiko"	R. N. Jayagopal	S. P. Balasubrahmanyam, Manjula Gururaj
4.	"Ayyo Shivane"	R. N. Jayagopal	S. P. Balasubrahmanyam, Manjula Gururaj
5.	"Nanna Preethi Devi Ninage"	R. N. Jayagopal	S. P. Balasubrahmanyam, Sangeetha Katti
