= Pattabhishekam (1985 film) =

- Theatrical release poster
- Directed by: K. Raghavendra Rao
- Written by: Paruchuri Brothers (story / dialogues)
- Screenplay by: K. Raghavendra Rao
- Produced by: Nandamuri Harikrishna
- Starring: Nandamuri Balakrishna; Vijayashanti
- Cinematography: K. S. Prakash Rao
- Edited by: R. B. Vemuri
- Music by: Chakravarthy
- Production company: Ramakrishna Cine Studios
- Release date: 19 December 1985
- Running time: 144 minutes
- Country: India
- Language: Telugu

Pattabhishekam (transl. Coronation) is a 1985 Indian Telugu-language romantic film directed by K. Raghavendra Rao. Produced by Nandamuri Harikrishna under Ramakrishna Cine Studios banner, the film stars Nandamuri Balakrishna and Vijayashanti with music composed by Chakravarthy.

== Cast ==
- Nandamuri Balakrishna as Balu
- Vijayashanti as Hema
- Rao Gopal Rao as Markandeyulu
- Sharada as Janaki
- Rajendra Prasad as Rajesh
- Kannada Prabhakar as Mastan Rao
- Nutan Prasad as Hanumanthu
- Sarath Babu as Lawyer Seetaram
- Chalapathi Rao as C.I. Krishna Murthy
- Raj Varma as Chinna Rao
- Chidatala Appa Rao
- Chitti Babu
- P. J. Sarma as Principal
- Mada as Tennis Coach
- Madan Mohan
- Jagga Rao
- Suryakantam as Warden Kantamma
- Sri Lakshmi as Hema's friend
- Kalpana Rai as Servant
- Y. Vijaya as Sumathi

== Music ==
Pattabhishekam

Soundtrack album by Chakravarthy
- Released: 1985
- Genre: Feature film soundtrack
- Length: 27:45
- Label: AVM Audio
- Producer: Chakravarthy

Chakravarthy chronology
Kattula Kondayya (1985)	Pattabhishekam (1985)	Nippulanti Manishi (1986)

Music was composed by Chakravarthy. Lyrics were written by Veturi. Music was released on AVM Audio.

S. No.	Song title	Singers	length
1	"Good Shot"	S. P. Balasubrahmanyam, S. Janaki	4:09
2	"Kalyaana Ghadiya"	S. P. Balasubrahmanyam, S. Janaki	4:27
3	"Ekkade Elage"	S. P. Balasubrahmanyam, S. Janaki	5:52
4	"Sooryudaa Vellipo"	S. P. Balasubrahmanyam, S. Janaki	4:10
5	"Venu Gana Loludiki"	S. P. Balasubrahmanyam, S. Janaki	4:39
6	"O Priyathamaa"	S. P. Balasubrahmanyam, S. Janaki	4:28

== Release ==
The film was released on 19 December 1985 to mixed reviews. The film was declared a Hit at the box office. The first week collection amounted to ₹96 lakhs which was second highest for a Telugu film at the time of its release.
