= Challenge Gopalakrishna =

- VCD cover
- Directed by: Sai Prakash
- Written by: Sai Prakash
- Based on: Aha Naa Pellanta (1987)
- Produced by: K. Chidambara Shetty
- Starring: Ananth Nag; Ashwini; Mukhyamantri Chandru
- Cinematography: R. N. K. Prasad
- Edited by: K. Narasaiah
- Music by: Upendra Kumar
- Production company: Chitra Productions
- Release date: 30 July 1990
- Running time: 131 minutes
- Country: India
- Language: Kannada

Challenge Gopalakrishna is a 1990 Indian Kannada comedy film directed and written by Om Sai Prakash. The film stars Anant Nag in the title role, along with Ashwini in the leading role. Actor Shashikumar made a brief appearance in a song sequence. The music of the film was composed by Upendra Kumar.

Produced by K. Chidambara Shetty under Chitra Productions banner, the film was released in 1990 and met with positive response from critics and audience. The film was a remake of Telugu film Aha Naa Pellanta.

== Cast ==
- Ananth Nag as Gopalakrishna
- Ashwini
- Shashikumar in a guest appearance
- Umashree
- Mukhyamantri Chandru
- Sihi Kahi Chandru
- Doddanna
- Girija Lokesh
- Disco Shanti
- Sarika
- Mysore Lokesh
- M. S. Umesh
- R. N. Sudarshan in a guest appearance

== Soundtrack ==
The film's soundtrack was composed by Upendra Kumar.

Track#	Song	Singer(s)	Lyrics
1	"Disco Shanti Seere Uttu"	B. R. Chaya	R. N. Jayagopal
2	"Hareyada Break Dance"	S. P. Balasubrahmanyam, Manjula Gururaj	R. N. Jayagopal
3	"Ee Hudugi Bombatu"	S. P. Balasubrahmanyam, Manjula Gururaj	R. N. Jayagopal
4	"Jipunara Sanga"	S. P. Balasubrahmanyam	R. N. Jayagopal
5	"Ju Laka Taka"	S. P. Balasubrahmanyam, Kusuma	R. N. Jayagopal
