= Aasegobba Meesegobba =

- Poster
- Directed by: M. S. Rajashekar
- Written by: Chi. Udayashankar (Dialogues)
- Based on: Gol Maal (1979)
- Produced by: Parvathamma Rajkumar
- Starring: Shiva Rajkumar; Sudha Rani; Ambareesh; K. S. Ashwath
- Cinematography: B. C. Gowrishankar
- Edited by: S. Manohar
- Music by: Upendra Kumar
- Distributed by: Vajreshwari Combines
- Release date: 1 March 1990
- Running time: 147 minutes
- Country: India
- Language: Kannada

Aasegobba Meesegobba (transl. One for desire, one for moustache) is a 1990 Indian Kannada-language comedy film, directed by M. S. Rajashekar. The film stars Shiva Rajkumar, Lokesh and Sudha Rani, whilst Raghavendra Rajkumar appears in a cameo. Ambareesh and K. S. Ashwath are in guest roles. The music was composed by Upendra Kumar. The film is a remake of Hrishikesh Mukherjee's 1979 Hindi film Gol Maal, which itself is a remake of the 1961 Bengali film Kanamachhi, Actress Shruti played Shiva Rajkumar's sister (credited as Priyadarshini).

== Plot ==
A young man gets a job in a company by making the boss believe that he is a man of traditional values. When the truth about his dishonesty comes to light, he tries to wriggle out of the precarious situation by inventing a non-existent twin brother.

== Cast ==
- Shiva Rajkumar as Ram Prasad & Laxman Prasad a.k.a. Lucky
- Lokesh as Badam Sadashivaiah Bhavanishankar
- Sudha Rani as Urmila (Bhavanishankar's daughter)
- Shruti (credited as Priyadarshini) as Radha (Ram Prasad's sister)
- Vaishali Kasaravalli as Bhavanishankar's sister
- S Malathi as Ganga Agumbe/Thunga Agumbe & Mrs Sharma
- G. V. Shivanand as Shivanand
- Mysore Lokesh
- Honnavalli Krishna
- Mandeep Roy
- Chitra Shenoy
- Nagesh Mayya
- Naveen
- Kunigal Ramanath
- Raghavendra Rajkumar in a cameo
- Ambareesh as himself in a guest role
- K. S. Ashwath as Police Inspector in a guest role

== Soundtrack ==
All songs were composed by Upendra Kumar

#	Title	Singer(s)
1	"Baa Kuniva"	S. P. Balasubrahmanyam, Manjula Gururaj
2	"Thanana Thandana"	Shiva Rajkumar, Manjula Gururaj
3	"Bombato Bombato"	Shiva Rajkumar and Raghavendra Rajkumar
4	"Kenakuthide"	S. P. Balasubrahmanyam
5	"Ella Burude"	Rajkumar
