= Hrudaya Hrudaya =

- Theatrical release poster
- Directed by: M. S. Rajashekar
- Written by: A. G. Sheshadri [Dialogues]
- Screenplay by: A. G. Sheshadri
- Story by: K.S.D.L. Chandru Anantha Rangachar
- Produced by: Parvathamma Rajkumar
- Starring: Shiva Rajkumar; Ramesh Aravind; Anu Prabhakar
- Cinematography: B. C. Gowrishankar
- Edited by: S. Manohar
- Music by: Hamsalekha
- Production company: Sri Vaishnavi Combines
- Distributed by: Sri Vajreshwari combines
- Release date: 16 September 1999
- Running time: 154 minutes
- Country: India
- Language: Kannada

Hrudaya Hrudaya (transl. Heart, heart) is a 1999 Kannada-language romantic drama film directed by M. S. Rajashekar and produced by Parvathamma Rajkumar. The film stars Shiva Rajkumar, Ramesh Aravind and Anu Prabhakar, making her debut, whilst Sarath Babu, Avinash and Chitra Shenoy play the supporting roles. The film was a box office success.

The film featured original score and soundtrack composed by Hamsalekha. At the 1999-00 Karnataka State Film Awards, the film was awarded in 2 categories including Best Actor, Best Dialogue Writer.

== Cast ==
- Shiva Rajkumar as Ravi
- Ramesh Aravind as Dr Suresh
- Anu Prabhakar as Usha
- Sarath Babu
- Avinash
- Chitra Shenoy
- Mandeep Roy
- Mico Manju
- Shankar Narayan
- Venkatesh Prasad
- Jyothi Gurucharan
- Siddaraj Kalyankar
- Jayakumari
- Vinay Rajkumar (credited as Master Vinay Raghavendra) as Vinu
- Jyotika

== Production ==
Newcomer Anu learned to drive for the film, because her character was to go into coma after a driving accident with a Fiat car.

== Soundtrack ==
The music was composed and lyrics written by Hamsalekha. The audio was received with positive reviews with the song "O Premada Gangeye" sung by Rajkumar and K. S. Chitra topping the charts.

Track listing
No.	Title	Singer(s)	Length
1.	"O Premada Gangeye"	Rajkumar, K. S. Chithra
2.	"Hey Hrudaya"	S. P. Balasubrahmanyam, K. S. Chitra
3.	"Mithra Mithra"	L. N. Shastry
4.	"Venkatesha Venkatesha"	S. P. Balasubrahmanyam
5.	"Hogi Baa Hogi Baa"	Rajkumar, K. S. Chithra
6.	"Ivale Nanna Rani"	Rajesh Krishnan, Shivarajkumar, Manjula Gururaj

== Awards ==
- Karnataka State Film Awards (1999-2000)
1. Best Actor - Shivarajkumar
2. Best Dialogue writer - A. G. Sheshadri
- The film was one among the twenty films considered as "movies with good quality" by the Karnataka State Government and was given a subsidy of ₹10 lakhs.

== Reception ==
Srikanth Srinivasa of Deccan Herald wrote "M S Rajashekar definitely needs to be commended for giving the soft treatment to the film. Ms Parvathamma Rajkumar needs to be commended for choosing a straight and a soft subject".
