= Station Master (1988 film) =

- DVD cover
- Directed by: Kodi Rama Krishna
- Written by: Ganesh Patro (dialogues)
- Screenplay by: Kodi Rama Krishna
- Story by: R.J.R. Unit
- Produced by: S. Ambarish; Rao Gopal Rao (Presents)
- Starring: Rajendra Prasad; Rajasekhar; Ashwini; Jeevitha Rajasekhar
- Cinematography: Vijay
- Edited by: Suresh Tata
- Music by: Chakravarthy
- Production company: R.J.R. Productions
- Release date: 2 March 1988
- Running time: 131 mins
- Country: India
- Language: Telugu

Station Master is a 1988 Telugu-language comedy-drama film, produced by S. Ambarish under the R.J.R. Productions banner, presented by Rao Gopal Rao and directed by Kodi Rama Krishna. It stars Rajendra Prasad, Rajasekhar, Ashwini, Jeevitha Rajasekhar and music composed by Chakravarthy. The film was recorded as a Super Hit at the box office.

== Cast ==
- Rajendra Prasad as Rama Rao
- Rajasekhar as Chaitanya
- Ashwini as Rani
- Jeevitha Rajasekhar as Pushpa
- Rao Gopal Rao as Station Master
- Suthi Veerabhadra Rao as Kurmavataram
- Suthi Velu as Talupulu
- Rallapalli as Bhavavi Shankar Ramlohiya Tilak Hitler
- Sakshi Ranga Rao as Manager Ranganayakulu
- Mallikarjuna Rao as Menon
- Chitti Babu as Gandabhirundam
- Chidatala Appa Rao
- Satti Babu
- Juttu Narasimham as Rikshawala
- Mithai Chitti
- Gadiraju Subba Rao as Driver
- Annapurna as Lakshmi
- P. R. Varalakshmi as Pushpa's mother
- Anitha as Doctor
- Chandrika as Gabbala Subbamma
- Y. Vijaya as Pollamma

== Soundtrack ==
Station Master

Film score by Chakravarthy
- Released: 1988
- Genre: Soundtrack
- Length: 22:52
- Label: AVM Audio
- Producer: Chakravarthy

Chakravarthy chronology
Anna Chellelu (1988)	Station Master (1988)	Bharyaa Bhartala Bhagotam (1988)

Music composed by Chakravarthy was released on AVM Audio Company.

Track listing
No.	Title	Lyrics	Singer(s)	Length
1.	"Sayyaataki Anthaa Ready"	Sirivennela Seetharama Sastry	P. Susheela, S. P. Balasubrahmanyam	4:28
2.	"Ekkadiko Ee Payanam"	C. Narayana Reddy	S. P. Balasubrahmanyam	4:10
3.	"Udukuu Udukuu Mudduu Isthe"	C. Narayana Reddy	P. Susheela, S. P. Balasubrahmanyam	4:14
4.	"Parugulu Theese Vayasunte"	Sirivennela Seetharama Sastry	P. Susheela, S. P. Balasubrahmanyam, Mano	4:16
5.	"Kottaraa Chappatlu"	C. Narayana Reddy	S. P. Balasubrahmanyam, Mano	3:53
Total length:				21:01
