= Kitturina Huli =

1991 film by Sai Prakash

- Directed by: Sai Prakash
- Written by: Sai Prakash
- Produced by: Sai Prakash
- Starring: Shashikumar; Malashri; Mukhyamantri Chandru; Chi. Guru Dutt
- Cinematography: J.G. Krishna
- Edited by: Narasaiah
- Music by: Upendra Kumar
- Production company: Sri Devi Pictures
- Release date: 1991
- Running time: 151 minutes
- Country: India
- Language: Kannada

Kitturina Huli (transl. Tiger of Kittur) is a 1991 Indian Kannada-language romantic drama film directed, written and produced by Sai Prakash. The film stars Shashikumar and Malashri.

The film's music was composed by Upendra Kumar and the audio was launched on the Lahari Music banner.

== Cast ==
- Shashikumar
- Malashri
- Chi. Guru Dutt
- Mukhyamantri Chandru
- Keerthi
- Doddanna
- Umashree
- Sihi Kahi Chandru
- Sihi Kahi Geetha
- Mysore Lokesh
- H. G. Dattatreya
- M. S. Karanth
- B. K. Shankar

== Soundtrack ==
The music of the film was composed by Upendra Kumar, with lyrics by R. N. Jayagopal and Kunigal Nagabhushan.

Track listing
No.	Title	Lyrics	Singer(s)	Length
1.	"Jagavide Nodu"	R. N. Jayagopal	S. P. Balasubrahmanyam, Manjula Gururaj
2.	"Ammamma Figaro"	Kunigal Nagabhushan	S. P. Balasubrahmanyam, Manjula Gururaj
3.	"Mungarina Male"	Kunigal Nagabhushan	S. P. Balasubrahmanyam, Manjula Gururaj
4.	"Oorella Malagida Samaya"	R. N. Jayagopal	S. P. Balasubrahmanyam, Sangeetha Katti
5.	"Enendu Poojisali"	R. N. Jayagopal	S. P. Balasubrahmanyam, Sangeetha Katti
6.	"Kelabeda Kelabeda"	R. N. Jayagopal	S. P. Balasubrahmanyam
