= Veta (1986 film) =

1986 film by Kondandarami Reddy

- Poster
- Directed by: A. Kodandarami Reddy
- Written by: Screenplay: A. Kodandarami Reddy; Dialogues: Paruchuri brothers
- Based on: The Count of Monte Cristo by Alexandre Dumas
- Produced by: M. Tirupathi Reddy
- Starring: Chiranjeevi; Jaya Prada; Sumalatha
- Cinematography: V. S. R. Swamy
- Edited by: M. Vellaiswamy
- Music by: Chakravarthy
- Production company: Samyuktha Movies
- Release date: 28 May 1986
- Country: India
- Language: Telugu

Veta (transl. Hunt) is a 1986 Indian Telugu-language period action film directed by A. Kondandarami Reddy. The film stars Chiranjeevi, Jayaprada, and Sumalatha in lead roles. Produced by Samyuktha Movies, it is an adaptation of Alexandre Dumas' novel The Count of Monte Cristo. The music was composed by K. Chakravarthy, with cinematography by V. S. R. Swamy.

The film brought together the successful team behind the 1983 blockbuster Khaidi, including Chiranjeevi, Samyuktha Movies, director Kodandarami Reddy, composer Chakravarthy, and writers Paruchuri brothers. However, Veta failed to replicate the success of its predecessor and was a commercial failure at the box office.

== Plot ==
Set in 1939 during the British rule of India, Pratap is a sailor in love with a wealthy woman. However, her cross-cousin Jayaram, who serves in the British army, also desires to marry her. When the ship's captain is poisoned by two crew members, Jayaram uses his influence to falsely accuse Pratap, resulting in his deportation to the secluded Andaman Jail.

Trapped in prison for thirteen years, Pratap eventually escapes, diving into the Andaman Sea where he is rescued by two sailors. Consumed by thoughts of vengeance against those who wronged him, Pratap teams up with Mahendra Bhupathi, a fellow inmate and former zamindar who also seeks revenge against Jayaram. Mahendra, on his deathbed, reveals the location of a hidden treasure on Malabar Island.

Pratap escapes from prison by substituting himself for Mahendra's dead body in a burial sack. After retrieving the treasure, Pratap reinvents himself as a wealthy zamindar. He finds Mahendra’s daughter, Jyothirmayi, who is also seeking vengeance, and provides her shelter. With calculated precision, Pratap infiltrates the nobility and systematically destroys those who betrayed him.

== Cast ==
- Chiranjeevi as Prathap, a sailor
- Jaya Prada as Saroja
- Sumalatha as Jyothirmayi
- Jaggayya as Mahendra Bhupathi
- Ranganath as Benarjee
- Nutan Prasad as Chowdappa
- Mohan Sharma as Jayaram
- Mikkilineni
- Mada

== Production ==
Veta is a Telugu adaptation of Alexandre Dumas' novel The Count of Monte Cristo, which has been adapted into several films in French and English. The Telugu version, translated in the 1950s, follows a man wrongfully imprisoned due to a conspiracy who seeks revenge against his betrayers. It was Tirupathi Reddy's idea to adapt this story as a film in Telugu and the writers Paruchuri Brothers adapted the story as pre-independence era.

During the development phase of Veta, it was reported that Nandamuri Balakrishna had shown interest in the film's story. Despite his initial interest and exploration of various adaptations, Balakrishna was unable to participate in the film. Consequently, the film was produced with Chiranjeevi in the lead role. Subsequently, the film was produced by the head of Samyuktha Movies, Tirupati Reddy, who pitched the story to Chiranjeevi and director A. Kodandarami Reddy. Veta was made with a significant budget of around ₹1 crore. Veta featured Chiranjeevi in new looks, with him working for 60 days on the film. Jaya Prada, his co-star, worked for 38 days.

== Music ==
Veta

Soundtrack album by K. Chakravarthy
- Released: 1986
- Recorded: 1986
- Genre: Feature film soundtrack
- Length: 22:06
- Language: Telugu
- Label: Lahari Music
- Producer: K. Chakravarthy

The music was composed by K. Chakravarthy and released through Saptaswar music label. Lyrics were written by Veturi, Sirivennela Seetharama Sastry and Rajasri.

Track list
No.	Title	Lyrics	Singer(s)	Length
1.	"O Raani"	Veturi	S. P. Balasubrahmanyam, P. Susheela	4:29
2.	"Singari Eedu"	Veturi	S. P. Balasubrahmanyam, S. Janaki & Chorus	4:22
3.	"O Ledi Koona"	Sirivennela Seetharama Sastry	K. J. Yesudas	4:18
4.	"Oorevitammaa Perevitammaa"	Rajasri	S. P. Balasubrahmanyam, P. Susheela & Chorus	4:35
5.	"Eduru Choosina Jaabili"	Veturi	S. P. Balasubrahmanyam, P. Susheela	4:22
Total length:				22:06

== Reception ==
Veta was released on 28 May 1986 with high expectations, due to its association with the successful team behind Khaidi (1983), including Chiranjeevi, director Kodandarami Reddy, composer Chakravarthy, and writers Paruchuri brothers. However, the film was a box office failure and did not live up to the expectations set by its predecessor.

In 2006, Kodandarami Reddy reflected on the film's failure, attributing its poor performance to the elevated expectations set by the success of Khaidi, coupled with the audience's dissatisfaction with the plot, particularly the heroine's marriage to another character. Tirupathi Reddy too opinionated the same. Chiranjeevi also expressed his deep disappointment, acknowledging the emotional toll the film's failure took on him and revealing that it took a considerable time for him to recover. In recent years, however, some viewers have re-evaluated Veta, now considering it an underrated film.
