= Shiva Rajkumar =

Indian actor (born 1962)

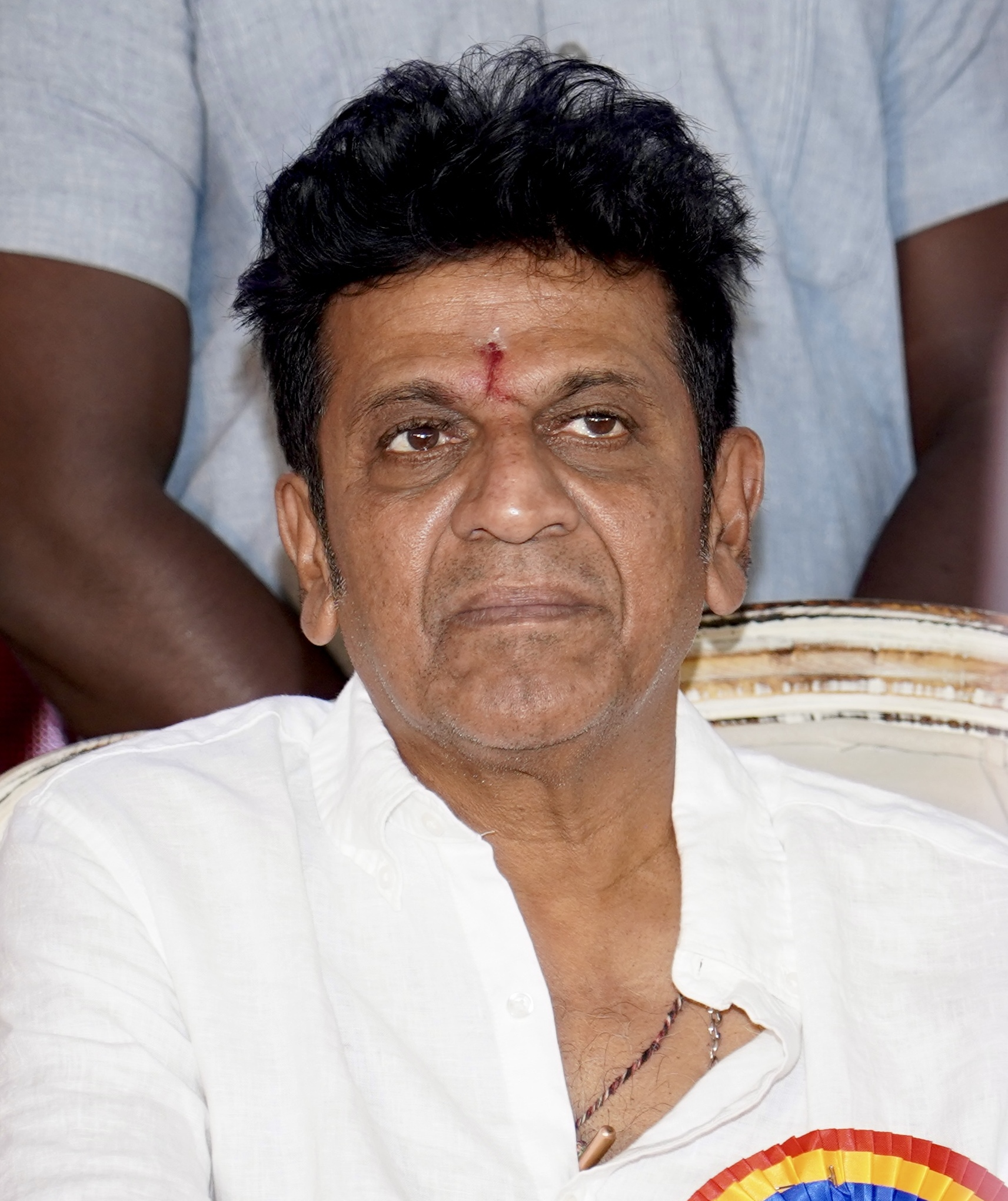
- Shiva Rajkumar in 2025
- Born: Nagaraju Shiva Puttaswamy; 12 July 1962 (age 64); Madras, Madras State, India
- Education: The New College, Chennai; M.G.R. Government Film and Television Training Institute
- Occupations: Actor; film producer; television presenter; playback singer
- Years active: 1968–present
- Works: Full list
- Spouse: Geeta
- Parents: Dr. Rajkumar; Parvathamma Rajkumar
- Relatives: See Rajkumar family

Shiva Rajkumar (born Nagaraju Shiva Puttaswamy; 12 July 1962) is an Indian actor, film producer and television presenter who predominantly works in Kannada cinema. In a career spanning over three decades, he has worked in over 125 films in Kannada and has received several awards, including four Karnataka State Film Awards, four Filmfare Awards South and six South Indian International Movie Awards.

Shiva Rajkumar is the eldest son of matinee idol Dr. Rajkumar. He is also fondly known as "Shivanna" by his fans. He made his first onscreen appearance in a blink and miss role in the 1968 movie Dhoomakethu - alongside V.Ravichandran. He was then seen in the 1974 movie Sri Srinivasa Kalyana as a child artiste. After graduating with a Bachelor of Science in Chemistry, Shiva Rajkumar began his film career at the age of 24 by starring in the leading role in his mother's production Anand (1986), which was a critical and commercial success. His performance in Anand which fetched him the Cinema Express Award for Best Actor. He then followed it up with Ratha Sapthami (1986) and Manamecchida Hudugi (1987), both of which were commercially successful, earning him the nickname of Hat-trick Hero, coined by the media and his fans. He then appeared in several successful films in the late 1980s with the romantic-thriller film Samyuktha (1988), the comedy-thriller Inspector Vikram (1988), the action-drama film Ranaranga (1988) and the comedy Aasegobba Meesegobba (1988).

Shiva Rajkumar achieved further critical and commercial success for his films in the 1990s, including his performances in the cult gangster-drama film Om (1995), which catapulted him into superstardom in Karnataka and won him his first Karnataka State Film Award for Best Actor and Filmfare Award for Best Actor and, the romantic dramas Janumada Jodi (1996) and Nammoora Mandara Hoove (1996), the action drama Simhada Mari (1997), the biographical film Bhoomi Thayiya Chochchala Maga (1998), the action-thriller film A. K. 47 (1999) and the romantic drama film Hrudaya Hrudaya (1999), which won him his second Karnataka State Film Award for Best Actor. His acclaimed performances as the film director Manoj in Nammoora Mandara Hoove and the vigilante Raam in A. K. 47 won him his second and third Filmfare Award for Best Actor respectively.

Anand, Ratha Sapthami (1986), Om (1995), Janumada Jodi, Nammoora Mandara Hoove, A. K. 47, Jogi, Bhajarangi, Mufti, Shivalinga and Tagaru which became milestones in the Kannada film industry and made records at the box office. In 2010, he made his television debut with the talk show Naaniruvude Nimagagi, aired on Zee Kannada. He made his first film appearances outside of Kannada cinema through the Telugu film Gautamiputra Satakarni (2017) and the Tamil film Jailer (2023) in cameo appearances. He produced a TV serial – Manasa Sarovara. He was also the co-producer of two web series – Hate You Romeo and Honeymoon.

== Early life and family ==
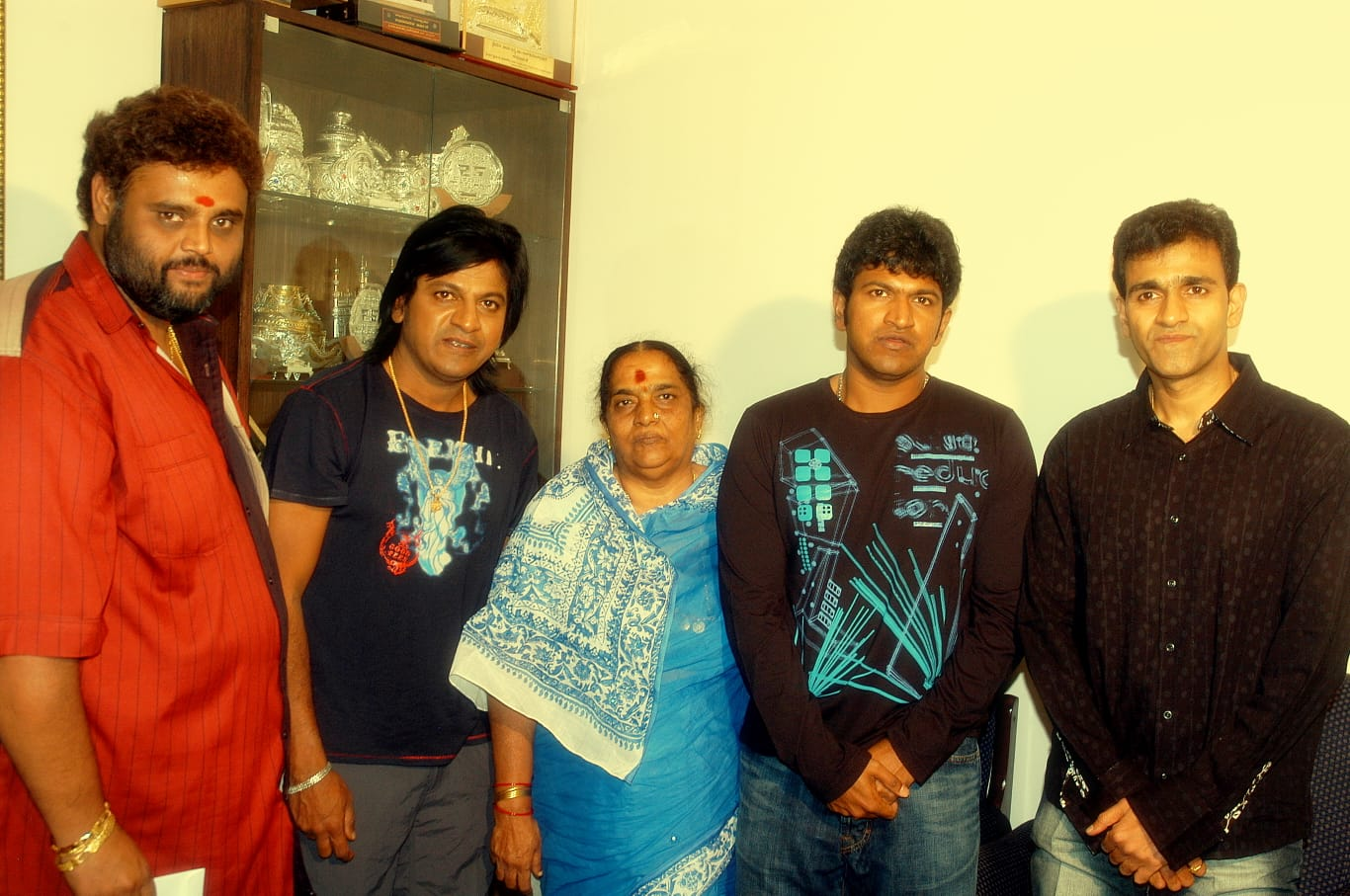
From (L to R) Ravi Srivatsa, Shiva Rajkumar, Parvathamma Rajkumar, Puneeth Rajkumar, Raghavendra Rajkumar

Shiva Rajkumar was born in Madras (now Chennai), Tamil Nadu, to actor Rajkumar and film producer Parvathamma as the first of five children. His two brothers are Raghavendra, a film producer and actor Puneeth. He did his schooling in T. Nagar, Chennai and then studied at the New College, Chennai.

Shiva Rajkumar joined an acting school in Chennai after completing his graduation from Madras University in 1983. After training in Kuchipudi dance form under Vempetti Chinni Sathyam in Chennai during his college days, he made his entry into the Kannada film industry with Anand.

== Acting career ==
=== 1986–2005: Debut to stardom; Om, Jogi ===
Shiva's acting career began as a child actor. He appeared in small roles in Dhoomakethu (1968) and Sri Srinivasa Kalyana (1974) — both starring his father Dr. Rajkumar. His debut as an adult came in Singeetham Srinivasa Rao's 1986 romance film Anand, in which he played the titular role. The film was a commercial success, as was his next two films Ratha Sapthami (1986) and Manamecchida Hudugi (1987), earning him the moniker Hattrick Hero. He played an cop in the titular role in Inspector Vikram (1989).

In 1995, Shiva starred in Om, directed by Upendra. Shiva played Satyamurthy, an innocent youth transformed into a rowdy after being drawn into crime. The film became a major commercial success and broke box-office records upon its release. Writing retrospectively, journalist S. Shyam Prasad noted that Shiva underplayed the character's transformation, portraying the change largely through attitude rather than appearance or behaviour. The film remained popular through multiple re-releases and continued to attract audiences years after its original release, gain a cult status among audiences. Shiva's notable releases after Om include the romance dramas Nammoora Mandara Hoove (1996) and Janumada Jodi (1998), and the crime action dramas Simhada Mari (1997) and A. K. 47 (1999).

In Bhoomi Thayiya Chochchala Maga (1998), Shiva Rajkumar played Karna, a friend of legislator Bharath Kumar, played by Ramesh Aravind, out on a mission to achieve the latter's unfulfilled goal of having a dam constructed in a village. His performance received praise; Srikanth Srinivasa of Deccan Herald called it his "best... till date". Srinivasa also praised Shiva Rajkumar for his performance in Don (2003), where he played a lawyer-turned-serial-killer, and wrote, "Shivanna excels in his role as the don. He has put in a spirited yet collected and controlled performance." In his other release of 2003, Chigurida Kanasu, he played a man who goes in search of his roots. The period also saw appear in Om Sai Prakash's family dramas such as Thavarige Baa Thangi (2002) and Anna Thangi (2005), both of which were commercial successes.

=== 2006–2016: Career fluctuations ===
In Gandugali Kumara Rama, his final release of 2006, Shiva played Kumara Rama, a 13th-century warrior prince, who defends his province against the invading forces of Muhammad bin Tughlaq despite personal and familial conflicts. Rediff praised his performance, noting that he "shows his maturity while performing such a complex role".

In 2010, Shiva appeared in Cheluveye Ninne Nodalu, which had song sequences shot at the seven wonders of the world. In his another release of the same year, Sugreeva, which was shot in 18 hours, Shiva played the titular role as a car mechanic who is unable to afford a heart transplant for his young son, nd ends up taking doctors and patients in a hospital hostage, demanding the operation in return for their release. Shiva's 100th film Jogayya was released in 2011, a sequel to Jogi.

=== 2017–present: Continued success, Tamil and Telugu film roles ===
In his last release of 2017, Shiva starred as mobster Bhairathi Ranagal in the crime drama, Mufti. The film was critically acclaimed and commercially successful. In his second collaboration with director Duniya Suri, Shiva Rajkumar played a cop that takes on the underworld in the latter's Tagaru (2018). The film proved to be another success and is seen as a landmark in his career. The Hindu called it "one of the biggest hits" of his career, and "... [t]his happens to be one of Shivanna's most mature performances." His only other release of 2018, Prem's The Villain, was not received well and a critic wrote, "[Shiva] expectedly, doesn’t disappoint but he is let down by a weak role."

Shiva Rajkumar made a cameo in his brother Puneeth's posthumous release James (2022), also dubbing for him in the film's end portions. In Vijay Milton's Bairagee, an adaptation of his Kadugu (2017), he plays Shivappa, a folk artist specialising in pulivesha, who gets entangled in the politics of the region. A critic wrote, "Shivarajkumar convincingly pulls off the role of a pulivesha artist and gives a stellar all-around performance. Shivanna takes us back to the classic characters that he played in films like Om, Jogi, and Kaddipudi." In his fourth collaboration with A. Harsha, and his 125th film, he starred in an eponymous role in the revenge drama Vedha. Shiva Rajkumar's first release of 2023 came through a cameo as gangster Siddhantha in R. Chandru's Kabzaa. The year marked his debut in Tamil cinema, with his next release coming in the Rajinikanth-starrer, Nelson Dilipkumar's action-comedy titled Jailer (2023). In another cameo, he played Narasimha, which was well received by audiences. The critic from The Hindu called it "excellent". Shiva Rajkumar's role in another Tamil film, Captain Miller, was confirmed in December 2022, and in an eponymous role in Bhairathi Ranagal, a prequel to Mufti, in May 2023. His heist film Ghost was released in October 2023. This was Shiva's first collaboration with Sreenivas. In 2024, the producers lauded him for appearing in a consistent number of films every year, which guarantees a certain minimum business at the box office. Shiva's 2024 film, Bhairathi Ranagal, was the first prequel of Kannada cinema.

In the Telugu sports drama Peddi (2026), Shiva played Gournaidu, the wrestling mentor of Ram Charan's titular character. While Rediff called him the film's "strongest supporting presence", Yashaswini Sri of The Indian Express wrote that Shiva "makes his presence felt without overwhelming the scenes he is in. He understands his job here is to support the story rather than draw focus, and he does it well. Though he had lesser screentime, he leaves a mark on the audience." Following this, he collaborated with Pavan Wadeyar and KVN Productions for the crime drama, Bail, which received mixed reviews and underperformed at the box-office.

== Personal life ==
Shiva Rajkumar is married to Geeta, the daughter of the former Chief Minister of Karnataka Sarekoppa Bangarappa. The couple have two daughters: Niveditha and Nirupama.

== In media ==
He was the brand ambassador of Royal Challengers Bangalore for their 11th Season of Indian Premier League and has now been appointed as the brand ambassador for Nandini milk products. He was the second Kannada actor to buy Maruti 800 when it was launched in 1983.

=== Statements about film industry ===
Shiva Rajkumar opposed the proposal of voice dubbed movies releasing in the Kannada film industry. He openly criticized the need for voice dubbed movies in the Indian film industry. However, once the Supreme Court gave its final verdict against the ban on dubbed movies, he announced that he would no longer oppose dubbing. He went on to say that if that is what the audience wants, he is not the one to oppose it. In 2003, he also gave a statement that he would not act in any remake movies. Since then, he has appeared in only 4 remakes out of more than 60 releases in lead roles over a period of 20 years. In 2025, he criticized the trend of spreading inflated box-office collections and the practice of paying people for filling theatres and artificially inflating the numbers.

== Awards and honours ==
Shiva Rajkumar won four Filmfare and four State awards in the best actor category. He has also won numerous Cine-Express, Sirigannada and ETV awards. He lent his name for creating awareness for social causes and charity. On his birthday, "Shivarajkumar Suvarana Mahotsava Abhinandana Samithi" was formed for charity.

- Recipient of Kohinoor of South India honor by the British South India Council of Commerce and Visionnaire Entertainment – London in 2016
- Recipient of NTR National Award for 2011

=== Honorary awards ===
- Honorary doctorate from Vijayanagara Sri Krishnadevaraya University of Bellary (2014).
- SIIMA Award for Social Responsibility (2012)
- The residents of Manyata Residency in Bangalore named the circle leading to his house as Dr. Shiva Rajkumar Circle on the occasion of his 60th birthday.
- He received Cinema Express Award for his debut movie, Anand.

=== Karnataka State Awards ===
Year	Award	Film	Result	Ref.
1995–96	Best Actor	Om	Won	
1999–2000	Best Actor	Hrudaya Hrudaya	Won	
2003–04	Best Actor	Chigurida Kanasu	Won	
2005–06	Best Actor	Jogi	Won	

=== Filmfare Awards South ===
Year	Award	Film	Result	Ref.
1995	Best Actor	Om	Won	
1996	Best Actor	Nammoora Mandara Hoove	Won	
1999	Best Actor	A. K.47	Won	
2010	Best Actor	Thamassu	Won	
2005	Best Actor	Jogi	Nominated	
2013	Best Actor	Bhajarangi	Nominated	
2015	Best Actor	Vajrakaya	Nominated	
2016	Best Actor	Santheyalli Nintha Kabira	Nominated	
2017	Best Actor	Mufti	Nominated	
2018	Best Actor	Tagaru	Nominated	
2024	Best Actor	Ghost	Nominated	
2025	Best Actor	Bhairathi Ranagal	Nominated	

=== South Indian International Movie Awards ===
Year	Award	Film	Result	Ref.
2012	SIIMA Award for Social Responsibility	—N/a	Won	
2013	Best Actor	Shiva	Won	
2014	Best Actor	Bhajarangi	Won	
2017	Best Actor	Shivalinga	Won	
2018	Best Actor	Mufti	Nominated	
2019	Best Actor	Tagaru	Nominated	
2024	Entertainer of the Year	Kabzaa, Jailer & Ghost	Won	
2024	Excellence in Cinema Award	—N/a	Won	
2025	Best Actor	Bhairathi Ranagal	Nominated	
