= Prithviraj (Kannada actor) =

Indian actor (born 1948)

- Born: Nuggehalli Rangaraj Prithviraj; 5 August 1948; Bengaluru, India
- Occupation: Actor
- Years active: 1983–present
- Spouse: Sridevi
- Children: 2

Nuggehalli Rangaraj Prithviraj is an Indian actor who appeared in Kannada films and Kannada television serials. He appeared in over 116 films and 64 television serials in his four-decade-long career.

== Film career ==
Prithviraj started his career as Engineer and retired as Assistant Manager in Indian Telephone Industries, Bengaluru. His interest in acting and Amateur Theater attracted him to films and his film career started in a role in the Kannada Film Accident by the Malgudi Days Fame Director and Kannada Actor Shankar Nag. Prithvi has acted in around 116 Kannada films in Supporting Actor Role of which his memorable roles were in the Movies Jeevana Chaitra, Parashuram, Odahuttidavaru with Dr. Rajkumar and in the movie Doctor Krishna with Dr. Vishnuvardhan. He has also done many movies with other popular stars of Kannada cinema Ambareesh in Saptapadi, Gandu Sidigundu, and Anant Nag's Ganeshana Madhuve, Ondu Cinema Kathe, Gauri Ganesha, Malla with Ravichandran. He also worked in Supporting Character roles for younger generation of Kannada Actors like Shivaraj Kumar, Sudharani, Puneeth Rajkumar, Sudeep and many more. He was one of the Sought after Supporting Actors of Kannada Cinema and Television Serials.

== Television ==
TV Serials from 1985 to 1999

- Namma Nammalli
- Ajitana Saahasagalu
- Sanghatane
- Kaamanabillu
- Shh Vicaarane Nadeyutide
- Devru Devru Devru
- Shivabhakta Kannappa
- Dharitri

TV Serials from 1999 till 2017

- Neeti Chakra
- Belli There
- Danda Pindagalu
- Abhimana
- Saptapadi
- Chaduranga
- Nitya
- Saahasa lakshmi
- Jagalagantiyaru
- Kusumanjali
- Mugilu
- Malegalalli Madumagalu
- Prerana
- Aantarya
- Minchu
- Mukta (TV series)
- Mumbelagu
- Chandrachakori
- Swarga
- Beedige Biddavaru
- Mobile
- Radha Kalyana
- Parampare
- Olave Jeevana Saakshaatkaara
- Amruthavarshini
- Pattedaari Pratibha
- Natyarani Shantala
- Nighooda

Hindi Serials

- Malgudi Days
- Stree

== Awards ==
- Prithviraj won best actor Dr. Rajkumar Prashasti at National Amateur Drama competition in 1981
- He won best actor awards thrice for his role in Kaamana Billu Serial

== Filmography ==
- Accident (1985)
- Thrishula (1985)
- Bidugadeya Bedi (1985)
- Lancha Lancha Lancha (1986)
- Henne Ninagenu Bandhana (1986)
- Ravana Rajya (1987)
- Sambhavami Yuge Yuge (1988)
- Parashuram (1989)
- Doctor Krishna (1989)
- Prathap (1990)
- Mruthyunjaya (1990)
- Ganeshana Maduve (1990)
- Modada Mareyalli (1991)
- Krama (1991)
- Gauri Ganesha (1991)
- Gandu Sidigundu (1991)
- Saptapadi (1992)
- Purushotthama (1992)
- Ondu Cinema Kathe (1992)
- Midida Shruthi (1992)
- Jeevana Chaithra (1992)
- Agni Panjara (1992)
- Nanendu Nimmavane (1993)
- Kempaiah IPS (1993)
- Hoovondu Beku Ballige (1993)
- Apoorva Jodi (1993)
- Anuragada Alegalu (1993)
- Sammilana (1994)
- Odahuttidavaru (1994)
- Mutthanna (1994)
- Lockup Death (1994)
- Gandugali (1994)
- Savya Sachi (1995)
- Lady Police (1995)
- Killer Diary (1995)
- Shreemathi Kalyana (1996)
- Circle Inspector (1996)
- Boss (1996)
- Aayudha (1996)
- Aadithya (1996)
- Shreemathi (1997)
- Sangliyana Part-3 (1997)
- Ganesha I Love You (1997)
- April Fool (1997)
- King (1998)
- Arjun Abhimanyu (1998)
- AK 47 (1999)
- Sparsha (2000)
- Deepavali (2000)
- Chamundi (2000)
- Asthra (2000)
- Vande Matharam (2001)
- Sri Manjunatha (2001)
- Mysore Huli (2001)
- Halu Sakkare (2001)
- Saadhu (2002)
- Nandi (2002)
- Nagarahavu (2002)
- Love U (2002)
- Dhum (2002)
- Appu (2002)
- Swathi Mutthu (2003)
- Mane Magalu (2003)
- Tada Khaidi (2003)
- Yardo Duddu Yellammana Jathre (2004)
- Bidalare (2004)
- Target (2004)
- Monalisa (2004)
- Malla (2005)
- Deadly Soma (2005)
- News (2005)
- Magic Ajji (2005)
- Rakshasa (2005)
- Udees (2005)
- Encounter Dayanayak (2005)
- Maharaja (2005)
- Ambi (2006)
- Hatavadi (2006)
- Uppi Dada MBBS (2006)
- Ugadi (2007)
- Soundarya (2007)
- Parodi (2007)
- Gulabi Talkies [Dubbing Artist] (2008)
- Prachanda Ravana (2008)
- Bindaas (2008)
- Preethi Andre Ishtena (2010)
- Preethiyinda Ramesh (2010)
- Sogasugara (2011)
- Cauvery Nagara (2013)
- Chakravyuha (2016)
