= Ganesha Subramanya =

Ganesha Subrahmanya
- Directed by: Phani Ramachandra
- Written by: Shyamasundara Kulkarni
- Produced by: Vishwa Sagar; N. P. Ganapathy; N. P. Subbaiah; K. M. Swamy
- Starring: Anant Nag; Ramesh Bhat; Bank Janardhan; Hema Chaudhary; Mukhyamantri Chandru; Manasa; Sujata Krishnan
- Narrated by: Phani Ramachandra
- Cinematography: R. Manjunath
- Edited by: Suresh Urs
- Music by: V. Manohar
- Production company: Kalapremi
- Release date: June 1992
- Running time: 147 minutes
- Country: India
- Language: Kannada

Ganesha Subrahmanya is a 1992 Indian Kannada-language comedy-drama film directed by Phani Ramachandra. Anant Nag and Ramesh Bhat play the celibate brothers Ganesha and Subrahmanya, Mukhyamantri Chandru plays the story-telling landlord and debutante Manasa plays the girl softens up Ganesha through her emotional dramas and successfully changes his views.

It is a story of two brothers who've been indoctrinated by their father into remaining bachelors until they achieve their professional goals. This film also tries to convey a message to both men and women, not to paint all members of the opposite gender with the same brush.

== Plot ==
Ganesha and Subrahmanya, two brothers, promised their late father that they would remain bachelors until they achieve something significant in their lives. Their father thinks marriage would hinder personal achievements. Ganesha, an architect, runs a construction firm, while younger brother Subrahmanya pursues fine arts. They shun female company, recoiling at the very sight of ladies. Much to their chagrin, they find themselves being sought by the fair sex much too often. Be it the girl residing in the house opposite to theirs or the middle-aged lady house-owner, they always find themselves in situations that they think could shake their principles.

Eventually, to be able to live in peace, they consult the house broker (Bank Janardhan) with the specifications that they want a rented house that does not have a single girl in the vicinity. After changing many rented houses due to "girl problems", they eventually get a rented house, whose owner is obsessed with story-telling, and treats his wife like an empress. Subrahmanya gets a chance to attend a specific fine arts course that he thinks would be useful to his career and has to go to Shivamogga for one year.

Unknown to the brothers, four people: the story-telling house owner, the pesky house broker and two girls - Vasantha and Rama, execute a well-scripted plan to bring about a change in their attitude towards the fairer gender.

Ganesha advertises for a typist at his construction company and a girl approaches his desk, spelling her name, "Rama". This makes Ganesha nervous. She succeeds in making Ganesha blush and walks out gleefully.

The new landlord is able to keep Ganesha deeply engrossed with his story-telling and mimicry of sounds. He observes Ganesha being engrossed in the story and teases him, asking what he (Ganesha) would do if such things really happen.

Whatever he narrates to Ganesha turns out to be real one night, as it rains heavily and Ganesha hears knocks on the door. Ganesha opens the door, and a girl, drenched in rainwater, falls into Ganesha's arms, unconscious. Ganesha carries her to the bedroom on the first floor, places her on the floor and locks the door.

The story-telling landlord returns to continue his story-telling, carroming both his as well as Ganesha's room keys. After the landlord leaves, Ganesha tries to open the lock of the room where he had placed the girl. He can not do so. He sits on the floor, leans against the stairs and falls asleep.

He is woken up the next morning, by the ringing doorbell. The story-telling landlord tells Ganesha that he had, accidentally (or intentionally), exchanged the keys. Ganesha gets his keys, hurries to the bedroom and unlocks it, only to see the "unconscious" girl in a white shroud and her wet clothes lying in a heap, along with a poison bottle.

Ganesha wakes her up by sprinkling water on her face. The girl, Vasantha, puts on an innocent look and seeks his help in getting fresh clothes to wear. This makes Ganesha enter a ladies' dress centre, nervously, to buy her a fresh dress set. Ganesha collides with one of his office staff member (Dingri Nagaraj) and hastily exits the shop. Ganesha is further put into a funny situation when he is about to hurry up the stairs to hand the dress to Vasantha, when the story-telling landlord arrives at his door, asking for a follow-up of his story.

Vasantha, faking impatience, asks him to hand over the dress. She then asks him to help fasten the hooks of her dress along her back. Unnoticed by Ganesha as he reluctantly fastens the hooks on her dress, Vasantha smiles broadly. All these are Vasantha's plans that succeed, but she expertly hides her delight. Vasantha softens up Ganesha, keeping a bottle of poison solely as an emotional blackmailing ploy.

Vasantha surely knows Ganesha is not really a celibate type of guy because he showed empathy and tried to help her when she was unconscious (this was a logic argued by the story-telling landlord previously).

Meanwhile, Subrahmanya returns from his course and is surprised and shocked to find the girl in the house. Subrahmanya too gets a taste of her emotional blackmailing drama. Upon the intervention and philosophising of the story-telling landlord, Subrahmanya convinces Ganesha to accept the words of the story-telling landlord and stop behaving curtly with her, else she might commit suicide. Ganesha reluctantly agrees.

Vasantha starts helping with all the household chores and preparing food, which the brothers had been doing themselves all these years. The brothers initially refuse to converse with her, bound by their celibacy oath. Vasantha's another round of emotional drama makes Subrahmanya snatch the poison and convince Ganesha that they should talk to her going forward.

Ganesha gradually yet reluctantly develops a liking for Vasantha because of her helping nature, who now feels very comfortable and is cheerful. She slowly and surely succeeds in changing his views about women. She enquires about his architectural business. She then suggests a novel approach to his architectural designing, which helps people who cannot afford expensive house construction methods. Ganesha agrees to her suggestion and this earns him great recognition and awards. In his speeches, Ganesha acknowledges Vasantha's role in his success in all of his felicitation programmes.

Meanwhile, Subrahmanya too succeeds in his fine arts career and he acknowledges the role of a girl (Rama, the typist candidate) in his success.

Towards the end of the film, Vasantha congratulates the brothers upon their achievements and packs up her bags to leave the brothers' house, Ganesha is reluctant to let her go. Vasantha explains to Ganesha that she wanted him to change his views about women, by helping him out with his tasks at home as well as providing inputs with his professional goals. She also wanted to prove to all women that it is wrong to blame all men for certain men's inappropriate behaviour with women. She mentions Ganesha and Subrahmanya had taken care of her very well during her stay in the house as an example that good men do exist. Since she succeeded in proving her points, she wants to leave and settle down with her Mr. Right.

Subrahmanya instantly suggests to Ganesha that he marry Vasantha. He too confesses that a woman played a big role in his success in fine arts. He adds that the woman who inspired him was in the house and called her. When Ganesha sees Rama, he exclaims that she had attended the typist's interview. Rama tells Ganesha that he was a tough nut to crack and so had asked her elder sister Vasantha to soften him up, with her emotional drama. The story-telling landlord and the house broker rush in and tell Ganesha and Subrahmanya that they are brothers; and also that Vasantha and Rama are the house broker's daughters. The story-telling landlord confiscates the letter (as dictated by Ganesha's and Subrahmanya's father) and tears it up, as Vasantha and Rama watch with broad smiles.

The film ends with Ganesha and Subrahmanya consigning their vows of celibacy to the dustbin; Ganesha marries Vasantha and Subrahmanya marries Rama.

== Cast ==
- Anant Nag as Ganesha
- Ramesh Bhat as Subramanya
- Shivaram as their father
- Hema Chaudhary as house owner no 1
- Mukhyamantri Chandru as the story-telling house owner
- Bank Janardhan as the house broker
- Manasa as Vasantha

== Music ==
V. Manohar composed all the songs for this film. This was his second film album composition, after debuting with Tharle Nan Maga. Manohar has also written the lyrics for this film, along with well-known poet K. S. Narasimha Swamy and B. Rudramurthy Shastri.

Songs:

1. "Brahmachari Endare" - Puttur Narasimha Nayak, L. N. Shastri
2. "Break The Age" - Chandrika Gururaj
3. "Hareya Baayaride" - Vani Jayaram
4. "Hendatiyobbalu Maneyolagiddare" - Puttur Narasimha Nayak
5. "O Kusuma Baale" - Vani Jairam

== Reception ==
Considering that the earlier two films of the trilogy - Ganeshana Maduve and Gowri Ganesha were hugely successful, this film did not do anything special at the box office. V. Manohar's songs, especially the "O Kusuma Baale" (lyrics by K. S. Narasimhaswamy) were well-received.
