= Vatara =

A Vatara (Kannada: ವಠಾರ) is a type of housing complex, similar to row houses, typically found in urban Karnataka, India. Vataras usually are single floor or have two stories, with a row of homes on each floor. They usually have a common corridor in the middle. They are usually occupied by middle-class families and students and typically have a single owner, who may or may not live in the same vatara. Akin to the chawls of Mumbai or a tenement, a Vatara is a typology that has emerged as a low-cost form of multiple housing.

== In popular culture ==
Life in vataras is portrayed in some Kannada films, e.g. Ganeshana Maduve directed by Phani Ramachandra. A popular TV serial in Kannada called Vatara (featuring the popular actor "Comedy Time" Ganesh) portrayed life in a vatara in Bengaluru.
