= Bindaas =

Bindaas may refer to:

- Bindaas (2008 film), a Kannada film directed by D. Rajendra Babu
- Bindaas (2010 film), a Telugu film directed by Veeru Potla
- Bindaas (2014 film), a Bengali film directed by Rajiv Kumar Biswas
- Bindhaast, a 1999 Marathi film by Chandrakant Kulkarni
- Bindass, a Hindi entertainment channel
