= Vaishali Kasaravalli =

Indian actress

- Born: 12 April 1952; Gulbarga, Karnataka, India
- Died: 27 September 2010 (aged 58); Bangalore, Karnataka, India
- Spouse: Girish Kasaravalli (m. 1978–2010)
- Children: Apurva (son); Ananya (daughter)

Vaishali Kasaravalli (12 April 1952 – 27 September 2010) was a noted Indian Kannada actress, television serial director, and costume designer.

== Early life ==
She was born on 12 April 1952 in Gulbarga to theatre enthusiast parents Dr. Chitagopi and Nirmala. She completed a BA.

== Career ==
=== Actor ===
She was initiated to theatre by B. V. Karanth. After her family migrated to Bangalore, Vaishali acted in many plays including Hayavadana, Jokumaraswamy, Midsummer Nights Dream, Natakakaarana Shdhaneyalli Aaru Paathragalu and many others. She also directed Sevanthi Prasanga and translated many classic works from Marathi and Hindi.

She made her film debut with Yaava Janmada Maitri followed by Professor Huchuraya in 1972. Her popular films are Akramana, Yarigu Helbedi, Kittu Puttu, Kubi Matthu Iyala, Angaialli Apsare, Kraurya, Hombisilu, Swamy, Thabarana Kathe, Ksheera Sagara, Anukolakkoba Ganda, Asegoba Meesegobba, Mooru Daarigalu, Mahadasoshi Sharana Basava, Chandramuki Pranasaki, Panjarada Gili, Hoovondhu Beku Ballige, Vigneswarana Vahana, Shanker Guru, Palitamsha, Parivarthana, Sparsha, Nigatha, Ganeshana Maduve, Gauri Ganesha, Thavarumane Udugore, No 73 Shanthi Nivasa, and others. Her performance as the leading lady in Aakramana directed by Girish Kasaravalli won her laurels and also a state government award for the Best actress.

Vaishali also acted in many tele-serials including Namma Nammalli, Kasa Musure Saroja, Malgudi Days, Kshamaya Daritri, Mayamruga, Manvanthara, Sadhane. Namma Nammalli directed by T. S. Nagabharana was the first of the serials she was featured in.

== Filmography ==
Year	Title	Role	Notes
1972	Yaava Janmada Maitri		
1972	Subhadra Kalyana		
1974	Professor Hucchuraya		
1974	Eradu Kanasu		
1974	Bhootayyana Maga Ayyu	Puttamma	
1974	Bangaarada Panjara	Pallavi	
1976	Phalitamsha		
1976	Parivarthane		
1977	Kittu Puttu	Kamali	
1978	Shankar Guru		
1978	Hombisilu	Dr. Vasanthi	
1979	Akramana		
1982	Manasa Sarovara		
1984	Vigneshwara Vahana		
1985	Maruthi Mahime		
1985	Mamatheya Madilu	Leela	
1986	Henne Ninagenu Bandhana		
1988	Chiranjeevi Sudhakar		
1988	Tabarana Kathe		
1988	Mahadasohi Sharana Basava		
1988	Kadina Benki		
1989	Bangarada Baduku		
1990	Shruthi		
1990	Hosa Jeevana	Rukku	
1990	Ganeshana Maduve	Satyabhama	
1990	Abhimanyu		
1990	Aasegobba Meesegobba		
1991	Thavarumane Udugore		
1991	Readymade Ganda		
1991	Mangalya		
1991	Kalyana Mantapa		
1991	Gowri Kalyana		
1991	Gauri Ganesha	Chandramouli's mother	
1992	Amara Prema		
1992	Ksheera Sagara		
1992	Hatamari Hennu Kiladi Gandu		
1992	Goonda Rajya		
1992	Ganesha Subramanya		
1992	Belliyappa Bangarappa		
1992	Agni Panjara		
1993	Nanendu Nimmavane		
1993	Manikantana Mahime		
1993	Kadambari		
1993	Hoovondu Beku Ballige		
1993	Anuragada Alegalu		
1993	Angaiyalli Apsare		
1994	Yarigu Helbedi		
1995	Nighatha		
1995	Hosa Baduku		
1996	Sowbhagya Devathe		
1996	Hello Daddy	Surabhi's grandmother	
1997	Prema Raga Hadu Gelathi		
1997	Kalavida	Vishwa's mother	
1997	America America	Bhoomika's mother	
1999	Chandramukhi Pranasakhi		
2000	Shrirasthu Shubhamasthu	Karthik's mother	
2000	Premi		
2003	Panchali		
2003	Wrong Number		
2006	Savira Mettilu		
2007	No 73, Shanthi Nivasa	Seethadevi	

=== Director ===
She has directed popular Kannada TV serials like Muttina Torana and Moodala Mane.

=== Dubbing artist ===
Year	Title	Actress
1978	Geejagana Goodu	
1978	Sandarbha	
1978	Vathsalya Patha	
1983	Anveshane	
1990	Mane	
2007	Nayi Neralu	

=== Costume designer ===
Vaishali Kasaravalli worked as a costume designer in her husband's films such as Bannada Vesha, Mane, Kubi Mathu Iyyala, Kraurya, Thaayi Saheba (won national award in 1998), Dweepa, and Kanasemba Kudureyaneri.

== Awards ==
Vaishali received several honors including

- State award for acting (Aakramana),
- National award for costume design (Thaayi Saheba),
- State Best supporting actress (Palitamsha),
- Natak Academy award and Rajyotsava award.

== Politics ==
Vaishali was into politics in the late '90s. She contested for the Bangalore City Corporation elections in 1996 from the Lok Shakti party but lost. She was a staunch admirer of former chief minister Ramakrishna Hegde.

== Personal life ==
Vaishali was married to acclaimed film-maker Girish Kasaravalli. She had two children, Apoorva Kasaravalli and Ananya Kasaravalli

== Death ==
She died on 27 September 2010 in Bangalore, after ailing for few years with diabetes, liver, and kidney problems. Her body was kept at Ravindra Kalakshetra for her relatives, friends, and fans to pay their final respect. She was cremated according to her family tradition at Banashankari crematorium in Bangalore.
