= Mukhyamantri Chandru =

Indian politician

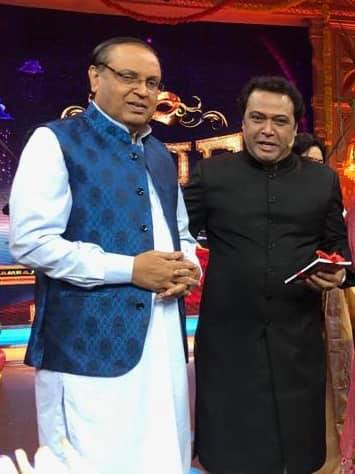
- Mukhyamantri Chandru (left)

State President of the Aam Aadmi Party of Karnataka
- Incumbent
- Assumed office 13 July 2023

Chairperson, Kannada Development Authority
- In office 10 June 2008 – 2014
- Preceded by: Siddalingaiah

Member of the Karnataka Legislative Council
- In office 1998–2010

Member of the Karnataka Legislative Assembly for Gauribidanur
- In office 1985–1989
- Preceded by: R. N. Lakshmipathi
- Succeeded by: Aswathanarayana Reddy

Personal details
- Born: Honnasandra Narasimhaiah Chandrashekar; 28 August 1953 (age 73) Honnasandra, Nelamangala, Bangalore Rural, Mysore State (now Karnataka), India
- Party: Aam Aadmi Party (2022–present)
- Other political affiliations: Indian National Congress (2014–2022): Bharatiya Janata Party (1991–2013); Janata Dal; Janata Party (1985–1991)
- Spouse: Padma (m. 1983)
- Children: 2
- Occupation: Actor; politician

Honnasandra Narasimhaiah Chandrashekar (born 28 August 1953), known popularly as Mukhyamantri Chandru, is an Indian actor and politician. As an actor, he is known for his work in Kannada theatre and cinema. The sobriquet Mukhyamantri (Chief Minister) stuck to his name after the play of the same name that sees him portray the title role became widely popular. Having portrayed mostly comic and negative roles throughout his career, Chandru is a character actor, and has acted in over 500 films since making his debut in 1983.

Chandru joined the Janata Party in 1985 and won the year's assembly elections from Gauribidanur. Switching to Bharatiya Janata Party (BJP), he became a member of the legislative council in 1998 and 2004. He served as the chairperson of the Kannada Development Authority till 2013 before quitting the party to join the Indian National Congress (INC) in 2014. Eight years later, he joined the Aam Aadmi Party. In 2026, he was appointed president of the Karnataka State Federation of Suppressed Backward Castes.

== Personal life ==
Chandru was born on 28 August 1953 into a family of farmers of Narasimhaiah and Thimmamma in Honnasandra, a village in the taluk of Nelamangala of Bangalore Rural district, in the Indian State of Mysore (now called Karnataka). He completed schooling at Siddaganga Matha in Tumkur He is a follower of Jainism before obtaining his bachelor's degree in science from Government Arts and Science College in Bangalore in 1974. There he was drawn to theatre after being a regular viewer of plays at the Ravindra Kalakshetra. He subsequently worked as a clerk in Bangalore University and also acting in plays at the same time.

Chandru married actress Padma on 25 June 1983. They appeared as a couple in the Ooh La La (2003), and the latter played Chief Minister in the 2000s soap opera Maneyondu Mooru Bagilu. They have two sons together, Bharath and Sharath. Recognizing his contribution to Kannada theatre and activism in promoting and safeguarding Kannada-language, Chandru was awarded an honorary doctorate by the Gulbarga University.

== Acting career ==
In 1978, Chandru, then a part of the troupe Kalagangotri, was chosen to play Krishna Dwaipayana Kaushal, the Chief Minister of a fictitious Indian State of Udayanchal. The role went to him after Lohithaswa, the actor who was to play the role, fell ill. Titled Mukhyamantri, Chief Minister in Kannada, the play is an adaptation of a 1976 book of the same name written by Ranjit Kapoor. In the play, the Chief Minister's role is shortened to KD Kaushal or KeDi, a word used to refer to a delinquent. Chandru "incorporated [his] own dialogues while acting, eventually turning the serious drama into a comedy". The play became widely popular and the sobriquet 'Mukhyamantri' stuck to him. As of May 2026, the play completed its 875th show across India and outside. Critics have noted that dialogues in the play have been changed over the years, and that "...the play remains ever fresh to its audiences, who see it as a reflection of their own times.

Chandru's career in films began in 1983 when he was cast by producer N. Veeraswamy to play a supporting role in Chakravyuha. His other notable role came in the comedy Ganeshana Maduve (1990) that saw him play an overbearing landlord, alongside Anant Nag. A shooting mishap during the filming of Central Rowdy (1991) led to partial loss of vision in his right eye.

== Political life ==
Chandru accepted the ticket offered by the ruling Janata Party to contest the 1985 Karnataka Legislative Assembly election from Gauribidanur. This followed after actors Anant Nag and Shankar Nag denied. Chandru won the seat by a margin of over 6,600 votes. Speaking about an incident to The Times of India of his stint as the Member of the Legislative Assembly, he said that the officers who assisted him when he "decided to get tough with the sand-mining mafia controlled by a liquor baron in his constituency" were transferred, and when he complained to Chief Minister Ramakrishna Hegde, he was to told to "get practical". Following the term, he contested unsuccessfully from the Chikballapur constituency in the 1989 Lok Sabha elections. His party merged with two other parties at the time to become Janata Dal.

In the early 1990s, with "rift between Ramakrishna Hegde and H. D. Deve Gowda worsening", Chandru quit the Janata Dal. In 1991, he joined the Bharatiya Janata Party. He was nominated as a member of the Karnataka Legislative Council in 1998 and for the second time in 2004, completing the term in 2010. In 2008, he was appointed the chairperson of the Kannada Development Authority. The position was the same rank of a cabinet minister, and Chandru was retained by the subsequent governments, despite his resignation from BJP in 2013. He cited "dedicat[ing himself] for the cause of the State and Kannada language" as the reason for the quitting. In March 2014, he joined the Indian National Congress (INC).

In his tenure as the chairperson of the Kannada Development Authority (KDA), Chandru advocated very strongly for the protection and promotion of the Kannada-language. The beginning of his tenure saw a significant development in that, on 31 October 2008, Kannada was given the status of a classical language. Recommendations made by him in view of promoting the language in Karnataka were met with both praise and criticism. In December, he called for a compulsory display of vehicle registration plates of all vehicles of the State government in Kannada starting January 2009.

In 2011, under Chandru's chairpersonship, the KDA recommended to the Karnataka government to make it mandatory for immigrants in the State to clear the Class VII-level tests of the language. Chandru felt that if "outsiders ... live off the resources here, they should also learn to understand the culture, history and language of the land". Other recommendations included the use of Kannada software in cellphones, and to take over all ancient palm-leaf manuscripts in private possession and declare them state property. Chandru was instrumental in the Kempegowda International Airport authorities agreeing to display signboards and nameplates in Kannada, in 2012.

Chandru pitched for making Kannada a compulsory subject from Classes I to V. In an interview with The Times of India in 2009, he had declared that his goal was to successfully implement Kannada as an administrative language in all government offices, and push for a legislation that mandates compulsory learning of Kannada from Classes I to IV. Disappointed with not being nominated by the INC to the Karnataka Legislative Council, Chandru quit the party in May 2022. He stated, "The party also did not give me any position. Just as an eyewash, I was made the president of the cultural cell, which I rejected." In June 2022, he joined the Aam Aadmi Party. He was appointed the Karnataka unit president of the party in July 2023.

=== Activism ===
In the first decade of the 21st century, Chandru is involved in various Kannada language activities concerning to the public, government and the mass media, has been instrumental in setting up bodies for the classical language's enhancement & encouragement.

== Partial filmography ==
=== Films ===
| Year | Title | Role | Notes | Ref. |
|---|---|---|---|---|
| 1979 | Muyyi | | | |
| 1980 | Hanthakana Sanchu | Robert | | |
| 1983 | Chakravyuha | Shankarappa | | |
| 1983 | Simha Gharjane | Patitha Pavana Murthy | | |
| 1983 | Mududida Tavare Aralithu | | | |
| 1984 | Premigala Saval | Gopal Rao | | |
| 1984 | Khaidi | | | |
| 1984 | Indina Bharatha | Vishakantaiah | | |
| 1985 | Naanu Nanna Hendthi | Urvashi's father | | |
| 1985 | Jwaalamukhi | Gunashekhara | | |
| 1985 | Swabhimana | Lakshmipathi | | |
| 1985 | Vajra Mushti | Krishna Nayak | | |
| 1985 | Chaduranga | Ramaraju | | |
| 1986 | Bete | | | |
| 1986 | Agni Parikshe | "Problem" Parandham | | |
| 1986 | Thayiye Nanna Devaru | Kariyanna | | |
| 1986 | Samsarada Guttu | "Gudi Bande" Gundappa | | |
| 1986 | Guri | Rudrayya | | |
| 1987 | Thayi | "Maryade" Mayanna | | |
| 1987 | Ondu Muttina Kathe | Mahabala | | |
| 1988 | Arjun | | | |
| 1988 | Anjada Gandu | Ranganath | | |
| 1988 | Avale Nanna Hendthi | Somashekharayya | | |
| 1988 | Nee Nanna Daiva | Bhujanga Rao | | |
| 1988 | Mathru Vathsalya | Soorayya | | |
| 1989 | Ondaagi Baalu | | | |
| 1989 | Neenu Nakkare Haalu Sakkare | | | |
| 1989 | Hongkongnalli Agent Amar | | | |
| 1989 | Poli Huduga | | | |
| 1989 | Yuga Purusha | Sir Judah | | |
| 1989 | Narasimha | Rangaramaiah | | |
| 1989 | Idu Saadhya | Siddha | Gues appearance | |
| 1989 | Hrudaya Geethe | Chandru | | |
| 1990 | Challenge Gopalakrishna | | | |
| 1990 | S. P. Sangliyana Part 2 | Dhanraj | | |
| 1990 | Policana Hendati | | | |
| 1990 | Golmaal Radhakrishna | Shankar | | |
| 1990 | Ganeshana Maduve | Ramanamurthy | | |
| 1990 | Prathap | Chief Minister | | |
| 1990 | Muthina Haara | | | |
| 1990 | Swarna Samsara | Rao | | |
| 1990 | Hosa Jeevana | Subbayya | | |
| 1991 | Golmaal Part 2 | Shankar / Jagannath Rao | | |
| 1991 | Kitturina Huli | | | |
| 1991 | Gauri Ganesha | Poornananda Rao | | |
| 1991 | Ibbaru Hendira Muddina Police | Madhavaiah | | |
| 1991 | Readymade Ganda | | | |
| 1991 | Gruhapravesha | | | |
| 1991 | Kalyana Mantapa | Alasingachar Perumal | | |
| 1992 | Hendtire Hushaar | | | |
| 1992 | Gopi Krishna | Musician | | |
| 1992 | Solillada Saradara | Rukmini's father | | |
| 1992 | Ganesha Subramanya | Landlord | | |
| 1992 | Nagaradalli Nayakaru | | | |
| 1992 | Malashree Mamashree | | | |
| 1992 | Ondu Cinema Kathe | Film producer | | |
| 1992 | Chikkejamanru | | | |
| 1992 | Mysore Jaana | Chandru | | |
| 1992 | Mannina Doni | Advocate | | |
| 1993 | Bhagavan Sri Saibaba | Khan | | |
| 1994 | Chinna | | | |
| 1994 | Yarigu Helbedi | Obalayya | | |
| 1994 | Gold Medal | Home Minister Harischandra Prasad | | |
| 1994 | Vijaya Kankana | Karunakar Rao | | |
| 1995 | Mister Abhishek | Kondayya | | |
| 1996 | Ibbara Naduve Muddina Aata | | | |
| 1996 | Sipayi | Baaji Bettayya | | |
| 1997 | Ammavra Ganda | | | |
| 1997 | Lakshmi Mahalakshmi | | | |
| 1999 | Suryavamsha | Padma's uncle | | |
| 2000 | Independence Day | | | |
| 2000 | Galate Aliyandru | Col. Vishwanath | | |
| 2001 | Mathadana | Sarvodaya Ramarao | | |
| 2001 | Jipuna Nanna Ganda | | | |
| 2002 | Simhadriya Simha | | | |
| 2002 | Balagalittu Olage Baa | | | |
| 2003 | Pakka Chukka | Chandru | | |
| 2003 | Stumble | Diwakar | English film | |
| 2005 | Mr. Bakra | Shankar | | |
| 2005 | Amrithadhare | Police Inspector | | |
| 2005 | Pandu Ranga Vittala | | | |
| 2006 | Kallarali Hoovagi | Murigeppa | | |
| 2006 | Savira Mettilu | | | |
| 2007 | Milana | Aakash's father | | |
| 2008 | Manasugula Mathu Madhura | Madappa | | |
| 2009 | Chickpete Sachagalu | Chandrashekhar | | |
| 2011 | Naanalla | Lawyer | | |
| 2011 | Kaanchaana | | | |
| 2012 | Parijatha | | | |
| 2012 | Govindaya Namaha | Vydehi's Father | | |
| 2012 | Kiladi Kitty | | | |
| 2012 | Gandhi Smiles | | | |
| 2012 | Samsaradalli Golmal | | | |
| 2012 | Dakota Picture | Halappa | | |
| 2013 | Varadhanayaka | Varadhanayaka's father | | |
| 2013 | Neenandre Ishta Kano | | | |
| 2013 | Chathrigalu Saar Chathrigalu | Narayan's uncle | | |
| 2014 | Savaari 2 | | | |
| 2014 | Pungi Daasa | Judge | | |
| 2015 | Rana Vikrama | Chief Minister | | |
| 2015 | Madam Helida Kathe | | | |
| 2015 | Lodde | | | |
| 2015 | Ganga | | | |
| 2016 | Madhura Swapna | | | |
| 2016 | Just Aakasmika | | | |
| 2020 | Law | Siddalingayya | | |
| 2021 | Munduvareda Adhyaya | Home Minister | | |
| 2023 | Kranti | Basava Rayanna | | |
| 2024 | Matthe Matthe | | | |
| 2024 | Gowri | | | |
| 2025 | Rhythm | Sangeetha's Grandfather | | |

=== Television ===
| Year | Title | Role | Notes | Ref. |
|---|---|---|---|---|
| 2013 | Agnisakshi | Vasudeva | | |
