= Nanendu Nimmavane =

- Directed by: H. S. Phani Ramachandra
- Screenplay by: H. S. Phani Ramachandra
- Story by: Based on Malladi Venkata Krishna Murthy's novel Repati Koduku (Little Rascal)
- Produced by: Dashami Technicians
- Starring: Vishnuvardhan; Srishanthi; Ramesh Bhat; Vinaya Prasad
- Cinematography: R. Manjunath
- Edited by: Suresh Urs
- Music by: Rajan–Nagendra
- Production company: Dashami Chithra
- Distributed by: Dashami Chithra
- Release date: 12 May 1993
- Running time: 141 min
- Country: India
- Language: Kannada

Nanendu Nimmavane (Kannada: ನಾನೆಂದೂ ನಿಮ್ಮವನೆ; English: I am always yours) is a 1993 Indian Kannada film, directed by H. S. Phani Ramachandra and produced by Dashami Technicians. The film stars Vishnuvardhan, Srishanthi, Ramesh Bhat and Vinaya Prasad in the lead roles. The film has musical score by Rajan–Nagendra.

The movie was based on the Telugu novel Repati Koduku (Little Rascal) by Malladi Venkata Krishna Murthy. The core story line, plot twists and the climax were seen in multiple movies such as Penne Nee Vaazhga (Tamil - 1967), Brahmachari (Telugu - 1968), Ek Nari Ek Brahmachari (Hindi - 1971), Brahmachari (Malayalam - 1972), Repati Koduku (Telugu - 1992), Minnaram (Malayalam - 1994), Azhagana Naatkal (Tamil - 2001) and Hungama 2 (Hindi - 2021).

== Cast ==
- Vishnuvardhan as Gopalakrishna
- Prakash Rai
- Vinaya Prasad as Devaki
- Srishanthi as Radha
- Ramesh Bhat as Mukunda
- Jai Jagadish as Jagadish
- Lokanath as Gopalakrishna's father
- Vaishali Kasaravalli as Girija
- Prithviraj
- M. S. Karanth
- Sihi Kahi Chandru
- Honnavalli Krishna
- Thriveni as Pramila
