= Ganeshana Maduve =

- Film poster
- Directed by: H.S. Phani Ramachandra
- Written by: Rajachandur
- Screenplay by: Kunigal Nagabhushan
- Story by: Malladi Venkata Krishna Murthy
- Based on: Vinayaka Rao Pelli by Malladi Venkata Krishnamurthy
- Produced by: Manikchand
- Starring: Anant Nag; Vinaya Prasad; Anjali; Mukhyamantri Chandru; Ramesh Bhat
- Cinematography: R. Manjunath
- Edited by: Suresh Urs
- Music by: Rajan–Nagendra
- Distributed by: Shakti Productions
- Release date: 1990
- Country: India
- Language: Kannada

Ganeshana Maduve (transl. Ganesha's Marriage) is a 1990 Kannada romantic comedy-drama film directed by Phani Ramachandra. It stars Anant Nag, Vinaya Prasad, Mukhyamantri Chandru, Ramesh Bhat among others. It was a big box-office hit in its time and is considered to be one of the great Kannada comedy films. The film is based on Malladi Venkata Krishna Murthy's Telugu comedy novel Vinayaka Rao Pelli.

== Plot ==
The plot essentially involves a love story between Ganesha, alias Y. G. Rao, and Adi Lakshmi, alias Shruti, who initially do not know the true identity of each other. Ganesha lives in a Vatara (housing complex) owned by Ramanamurthy. Shastri, known for his love of beer, is his roommate. Ramanamurthy maintains a traditional Hindu middle class household. His elder daughter has eloped with a lover and he does not approve of this. Eventually, he gets her to hold a traditional wedding, even though she has been married already in a civil marriage and has two children, to accept her back as a daughter. In order to prevent a similar fate for his younger daughter, Adilakshmi, he wants to find a match for her, so she can have an arranged marriage. His friend, Govinda (who is also Ganesha's father), in the meanwhile, arrives in Bangalore from Mysore, with his cricket-crazy wife (played by Vaishali Kasaravalli). Govinda and Ramanamurthy find out that both their children would make a good match for each other and decide to hold an engagement for them.

In the meanwhile, Ganesha falls in love with the singer Shruti, whose singing he hears on the national radio, although he has never met her. He writes letters expressing his admiration and love, using the "more modern" pen-name of Y. G. Rao (shortened from Y. Ganesh Rao), to All India Radio where Shruti, alias Adilakshmi, reads them and falls in love with Y. G. Rao. But as they actually meet each other in the vatara, they express a feeling of mutual animosity. As soon as they hear that their engagement has been fixed, they try to get out of this by various means, all devised by Shastri. Both of them succeed in doing so and the friendship between Ramanamurthy and Govinda is strained as a result. But eventually, Ganesha and Adilakshmi discover that they are actually Y. G. Rao and Shruti respectively and fall in love and decide to get married. Ramanamurthy, in the meanwhile, tries to fix Adilakshmi's wedding to Parameshi, a film director. But she convinces her father that Parameshi has AIDS with the help of Ganesha and a fake doctor and the engagement is cancelled. So, in the final scene they explain their love to both their parents, convince them by some situational means and get married. Shastri is also married to Abhilasha, who initially had the hots for Ganesha.

== Cast ==
- Anant Nag as the title character Ganesha
- Vinaya Prasad as Adi Lakshmi – daughter of the house-owner
- Mukhyamantri Chandru as Ramanamurthy – the house-owner
- Ramesh Bhat as Shastri – Ganesha's roommate alias beer lover who gives ideas
- Shivaram as Govinda Raya – Ganesha's Father
- Vaishali Kasaravalli as Sathyabhama – Ganesha's mother also a cricket buff
- M. S. Umesh – as Shatabhisha, one of the tenants of the Vathara (Colony)
- Rathnakar as Vamana murthy, one of the tenants of the Vathara
- Sathyabhama as Kanaka Lakshmi – wife of house owner Ramanamurthy and Adi Lakshmi's mother
- Anjali Sudhakar as Abhilasha, one of the tenants of the Vathara
- Honnavalli Krishna as Parameshi, a movie director and cousin of Adi Lakshmi intending to marry her.
- Manju Malini as Gajalakshmi
- Prithviraj as Parameshi's father
- Sihi Kahi Chandru as Chandru – Rent Control Officer (Guest Appearance)
- Vishnuvardhan as himself (Guest Appearance)

== Production ==
The film was shot in a Vatara (housing complex), in Sheshadripuram, Bangalore. One of the more memorable scenes involving the painting of the house has a funny story behind it. Originally, it was meant that the whole vatara was to be painted. But due to a low budget, this was not found feasible and in order to make it sound reasonable through the plot, the scene where Ganesha brings a dog and punishes it by calling it "Ramanamurthy" was modified. In the modified scene, the house-owner Ramanamurthy, feeling insulted by Ganesha's actions, agrees to Ganesha's demand for fairness and decides not to paint his own house nor any of the other houses.

== Soundtrack ==
The film's soundtrack was composed by the famed duo Rajan–Nagendra.

| Track# | Song | Singer(s) | Duration |
|---|---|---|---|
| 1 | "Premada Shruthi Meetide" | S. Janaki, Jayachandran | 4:26 |
| 2 | "Shridevi Madhavi Kannota Beda" | S. Janaki, Jayachandran | 4:56 |
| 3 | "Soundarya Nodu Nalla" | S. Janaki | 4:16 |
| 4 | "Anuragathotadalli Hoovante Naanu" | S. Janaki | 4:05 |
| 5 | "Bengalooru Citiya Olage" | Nagendrappa, Mukhyamantri Chandru and others | 1:28 |
