= Anuragada Alegalu =

Indian Kannada-language romantic drama film

- VCD cover
- Directed by: S. Narayan
- Written by: S. Narayan
- Produced by: Parvathamma Rajkumar
- Starring: Raghavendra Rajkumar; Mamathashree; Balaraj
- Cinematography: P. K. H. Das
- Edited by: S. Manohar
- Music by: Hamsalekha
- Production company: Sri Vaishnavi Combines
- Distributed by: Poornima Enterprises
- Release date: 8 February 1993
- Running time: 151 mins
- Country: India
- Language: Kannada

Anuragada Alegalu (transl. Waves of love) is a 1993 Indian Kannada-language romantic drama film written and directed by S. Narayan. Produced by Parvathamma Rajkumar, the film stars Raghavendra Rajkumar and Mamathashree in the lead roles. Balaraj, K. S. Ashwath, Prithviraj and Thoogudeepa Srinivas play key supporting roles. The music is composed by Hamsalekha.

== Premises ==
A singer meets and falls in love with a girl at a party, unaware that she is the same person sending him anonymous love letters. The plot takes a tragic turn when he is diagnosed with blood cancer.

== Cast ==
- Raghavendra Rajkumar as Priyadarshan
- Mamathashree
- Balaraj
- Thoogudeepa Srinivas
- K. S. Ashwath
- Prithviraj
- Tennis Krishna
- Vaishali Kasaravalli
- Shobhraj
- M. S. Rajashekar
- Rockline Venkatesh
- Shanthamma
- Sampangi
- Bheema Rao
- Kunigal Ramanath
- Ashwath Narayan
- Master Vinay Raghavendra in the song "Ambarada Thaare"

== Production ==
The film's script was initiated by actor Raghuveer who shared it to the director Narayan. Narayan, who was supposed to write the dialogues for the film Shrungara Kavya (1993), quit the team and developed the story based on the script shared by Raghuveer and directed later. The base plot for both the films are found to be similar and both were released during the same year. Vinay Rajkumar, aged 4, made his debut as an actor.

== Soundtrack ==
Anuragada Alegalu

Film score by Hamsalekha
- Released: 1993
- Genre: Soundtrack
- Length: 19:34
- Producer: Hamsalekha

The film's music is composed and lyrics written by Hamsalekha.

S. No.	Song title	Lyrics	Singers	length
1	"Kannadada Kanda"	Hamsalekha	Raghavendra Rajkumar	4:54
2	"Anuragada Alegala Mele"	Chi. Udayashankar	Raghavendra Rajkumar, Manjula Gururaj	4:44
3	"Naanu Haado Haadu"	Chi. Udayashankar	Raghavendra Rajkumar	3:34
4	"Ambarada Thaare"	Chi. Udayashankar	Raghavendra Rajkumar, Manjula Gururaj	4.03
5	"Manjula Manjula"	Chi. Udayashankar	Raghavendra Rajkumar, Manjula Gururaj	3.58
6	"Sagarave Sagarave"	Chi. Udayashankar	Raghavendra Rajkumar	4.01
7	"Jeeva Kogile Inchara"	Chi. Udayashankar	Dr. Rajkumar	4.18
