= Doctor Krishna =

- Directed by: Phani Ramachandra
- Written by: Phani Ramachandra
- Screenplay by: Phani Ramachandra
- Produced by: Vijaya Shankar Bhat
- Starring: Vishnuvardhan; Suman Ranganathan; Tara
- Cinematography: D. V. Jayaram
- Edited by: Manjunath
- Music by: Rajan–Nagendra
- Production company: Sathya Sai Movies
- Release date: 27 December 1989
- Running time: 134 minutes
- Country: India
- Language: Kannada

Doctor Krishna is a 1989 Indian Kannada drama film, directed and written by Phani Ramachandra. The film stars Vishnuvardhan in the title role, along with Suman Ranganathan and Tara in leading roles. The music of the film was composed by Rajan–Nagendra.

Produced by Vijaya Shankar Bhat under Satya Sai Movies banner, the film was released in 1989 and met with positive response from critics and audience. Actress Leelavathi won the State award for Best Supporting actress and the film was nominated under best film category.

== Cast ==
- Vishnuvardhan as Dr. Krishna
- Suman Ranganathan as Chanchala
- Tara as Raji
- Umashree
- G. K. Govinda Rao
- Leelavathi
- Ramesh Bhat
- Vijay Kashi
- Kavya Krishnamurthy
- Aparna
- M. V. Vasudeva Rao

== Soundtrack ==
The film's soundtrack was composed by Rajan–Nagendra.

Track#	Song	Singer(s)	Lyrics
1	"Karunamayi Neene"	S. P. Balasubrahmanyam, K. S. Chithra	Su. Rudramurthy Shastry
2	"Helida Maathu"	S. P. Balasubrahmanyam, K. S. Chithra	Chi. Udaya Shankar
3	"Doctor Krishnana"	Manjula Gururaj	Chi. Udaya Shankar
4	"Bali Barele"	S. P. Balasubrahmanyam, K. S. Chithra	V. Manohar
5	"Doctor Andre Doctor"	S. P. Balasubrahmanyam, Manjula Gururaj	Shyamsundar Kulkarni
