= Malladi Venkata Krishna Murthy =

Indian author (born 1949)

- మల్లాది వెంకట కృష్ణమూర్తి
- Born: 13 November 1949 (age 76); Vijayawada, Madras State, India (now in Andhra Pradesh, India)
- Education: Commerce
- Alma mater: Andhra University
- Occupation: Writer
- Spouse: Padmaja
- Parents: Malladi Dakshina Murthy (father); Saradamba (mother)

Malladi Venkata Krishna Murthy (born 13 November 1949) is an Indian Telugu-language author. He is known for writing thriller plots.

== Career ==
Murthy wrote many novels and short stories. The film Jyothi Lakshmi (2015) is based on one of his novels, Mrs. Parankusam (1981).

Phani Ramachandra made three Kannada movies based on his novels: Ganeshana Maduve, Gauri Ganesha, and Nanendu Nimmavane. His film Ganesha I Love You had core plot elements adapted from the novel Rendu Rella Aaru.

The film Rendu Rella Aaru (1986) is based on the 1984 book of the same name. Chantabbai (1984) was also made into a film of the same name (1986). Rēpaṭi koḍuku (1984) was the basis for Penne Nee Vaazhga (1967) in Tamil; Nanendu Nimmavane (1993) in Kannada; Minnaram (1994) in Malayalam; and Hungama 2 (2021) in Hindi, and served as an inspiration for Tamil film Azhagana Naatkal (2001). It also had a film of the same name (1992), as did Ḍabbevariki chedu (1985). Peddalaku mātramē (1985) was made into the film Srivari Shobanam (1985); Mr V (1986) became Jhansi Rani (1988); Mr No (1986) inspired A Shyam Gopal Varma Film (2015); and Śanivāraṁ nādi (1987) was made into Anasuya (2007).

Veḍḍiṅg bel (1986) inspired three films: Gauri Ganesha (1991) in Kannada and its remakes - Golmaal Govindam (1992) in Telugu; and Kumbakonam Gopalu (1998) in Tamil. Neeku Naku Pellanta (1988) had a movie with the same name released the same year as publication. Vināyakarāvu peḷḷi (1988) was made into Ganeshana Maduve; Tēneṭīga (1989) into Teneteega (1991); and Tom'miḍi gaṇṭalu (1989) into the television series 9 Hours (2022). Ṣ! Gapcup! (1989) into a film with the same name; Viṭamin M (1992) was adapted twice as Chakrapani and Lucky Chance (1994); and Rēpōmāpōpeḷḷaṇṭa (1998) as Vichitram (1999). Idē, nā n'yāyam! was made into a Tamil-language film which was dubbed into Telugu as Dharma Yuddham. Andamaina Jeevitam was adapted into the 2023 Hindi movie 8 A.M. Metro.

== Bibliography ==
=== Novels ===
- 1979: అదిగో పులి [Adigō Puli] (thriller)
- 1981: స్రవంతి [Sravanti]
- 1981: బలి కోరిన వజ్రాలు [Balikōrina vajrālu] (thriller)
- 1983: నత్తలొస్తున్నాయి జాగ్రత్త [Nattalostunnāyi jāgratta] (fantasy)
- 1984: చంటబ్బాయ్ [Caṇṭabbāy] (comedy novel)
- 1984: రెండురెళ్ళు ఆరు [Reṇḍu reḷḷu āru]
- 1984: కొత్త శతృవు [Kottaśatr̥vu] (fantasy)
- 1984: ఈ గంట గడిస్తే చాలు [Ī gaṇṭa gaḍistēcālu] (thriller)
- 1984: రేపటి కొడుకు [Rēpaṭi koḍuku]
- 1984: లిటిల్ రాస్కల్ [Liṭil rāskal/Little Rascal]
- 1985: డబ్బెవరికిచేదు [Ḍabbevariki cēdu?] (thriller)
- 1985: పెద్దలకు మాత్రమే [Peddalaku mātramē] (comedy)
- 1985: ధర్మ యుద్ధం [Dharmayuddhaṃ] (thriller)
- 1985: పారిపోయిన ఖైదీలు [Pāripōyina Khaidīlu] (thriller)
- 1985: మందాకిని [Mandākini]
- 1986: సముద్రపు దొంగలు [Samudrapu Dongalu] (thriller)
- 1986: రాక్షస సంహారం [Rākṣasa saṃhāraṃ] (thriller)
- 1986: సావిరహే [Sāvirahē]
- 1986: వెడ్డింగ్ బెల్స్ [Veḍḍiṅg bels/Wedding Bells] (comedy)
- 1986: మిసెస్ పరాంకుశం [Mises parānkuśam/Misses Parankusam]
- 1986: మిష్టర్ నో [Mr No] (thriller)
- 1986: ఇదే, నా న్యాయం [Idē, nā n'yāyam!]
- 1986: మిస్టర్ వి [Mr V ] (thriller)
- 1987: దూరం [Dūraṁ] (romance)
- 1987: లావణ్య [Lavanya]
- 1987: నాకు నువ్వు, నీకు నేను [Oka nuvvū-oka nēnu]
- 1987: పడమటి సంధ్యా రాగం [Paḍamaṭi sandhyā rāgaṁ]
- 1987: అయిర్ హోస్టీస్ [Eyir hōsṭes/Airhostess] (thriller)
- 1987: శనివారం నాది [Śanivāraṁ nādi] (thriller)
- 1988: డి గెస్త్ [Ḍi gest/The Guest]
- 1988: ఒకటి ఒంటరి అంకే [Okaṭi oṇṭari aṅke]
- 1988: నీకూ నాకూ పెళ్ళంట [Nīkū nākū peḷlaṇṭa]
- 1988: వినాయకరావు పెళ్ళి [Vināyakarāvu peḷḷi] (Comedy)
- 1989: అందమైన జీవితం [Andamaina jīvitaṃ]
- 1989: తేనెటీగ [Tēneṭīga]
- 1989: తొమ్మిది గంటలు [Tom'miḍi gaṇṭalu]
- 1989: ష్! గప్ చుప్ [Ṣ! Gapcup!] (thriller)
- 1990: యమాయ నమః [Yamāya namaḥ]
- 1990: దొంగాట [Doṅgāṭa] (thriller)
- 1991: మాట్లాడేబొమ్మ [Māṭlāḍēbomma] (thriller)
- 1991: పాణిగ్రహణం [Pāṇigrahaṇaṃ]
- 1991: విటమిన్ "యం" [Viṭamin "Yaṃ"/Vitamin M] (comedy)
- 1993: సారీ రాంగ్ నెంబర్ [Sārī! Rāṅg nambar/Sorry! Wrong Number] (thriller)
- 1994: బ్లఫ్‌ మాస్టర్‌ [Blaph māsṭar/Bluff Master]
- 1995: వైకుంఠ యాత్ర [Vaikuṇṭha yātra] (thriller)
- 1995: అంకుల్ సాం [Āṅkul Sām/Uncle Sam] (thriller)
- 1997: ఎవరికీ చెప్పకు! [Evarikī ceppaka!]
- 1997: లూపికా రాణి అతడు ఆమె [Lūpikā rāṇi ataḍu āme]
- 1997: నన్ను ముట్టుకోకు [Nannu muṭṭukōku/Touch Me Not]
- 1998: రేపోమాపో పెళ్ళంట [Rēpōmāpōpeḷḷaṇṭa]
- 1998: విలానా [Vilānā/Villian] (thriller)
- 1999: అనగనగా ఒక అతిథి [Anaganagā oka atithi]
- 2000: కనబడుట లేద [Kanabaḍuṭa lēdu] (thriller)
- 2000: ముంగిట మృత్యువు [Muṅgiṭa mr̥tyuvu] (thriller)
- 2001: నిన్నటి పున్నమి [Ninna ṭipunnami] (family novel)
- 2001: గ్రీన్ కార్డ్ [Grīn kārḍ/Green Card] (thriller)
- 2002: ఓ మై గాడ్ [Ō mai gāḍ/O My God] (spiritual articles)
- 2003: పున్నమి [Punnami] (thriller)
- 2003: సద్దాం ఆంటీ ఇంటి కథ [Saddāṃ āṇṭī iṇṭi katha] (thriller)
- 2003: జయం [Jayaṃ] (spiritual novel)
- 2004: ప్రాక్టికల్ జోకర్ [Prākṭikal jōkar/Practical Joker] (thriller)
- 2004: ముద్దుకు మూడే ముళ్ళంట [Mudduku mūḍē muḷḷaṇṭa]
- 2006: ఆత్మీయ చిన్న కథలు [Āthyātmika cinna kathalu]
- 2006: ఎఫ్ ఐ ఆర్ [Eph. Ai. Ār] (thriller)
- 2006: ఓ మంచి మాట [O Manchi Maata] (spiritual articles)
- 2008: ఎంతెంత దూరం [Enthentha dūraṁ] (comedy)
- 2008: సద్గురు నిత్యానంద బాబా జీవిత చరిత్ర [Sadguru Nityānanda bābā jīvita caritra] (biography)
- 2009: తాడంకి-డి థార్డ్ [Tāḍaṅki-di tharḍ/Tadanki the third] (thriller)
- 2009: దైవం వైపు [Daivaṃ vaipu] (spiritual articles)
- 2010: అ ఆ ఇ ఈ [A ā i ī/A AA E EE] (spiritual essays)
- 2010: పరంజ్యోతి [Parañjyōti] (spiritual novel)
- 2010: భజ గోవిందం [Bhajagōvindaṃ]
- 2010: డి ఎండ్ [Di eṇḍ/The End] (thriller)
- 2012: విధాత [Vidhāta] (spiritual novel)
- 2012: మిష్టర్ మిరియమ్ [Misṭar miriyaṃ/Mr Miriyam] (novel)
- 2014: సివారి కోరిక [Civari kōrika] (thriller)
- 2015: యమదూత [Yamadūta] (thriller)
- 2017: ప్రయాణం [Prayāṇaṃ]
- 2020: ఆఖరి అతిధి [Aakhari Athidhi]
- 2020: పదకొండు పన్నెండు పదమూడు [Padakoṇḍu panneṇḍu padamūḍu]
- 2022: స్వీట్ రివెంజ్ [Sweet Revenge]
- కల్నల్ ఏకలింగం ఎడ్వెంచర్స్ [Kalnal ēkaliṅgaṁ eḍvan̄cars/Colonel Ekalingam Adventures] (comedy)
- డి ఫర్ డెత్ [Ḍi phar ḍet/D For Death] (thriller)
- డెత్ సర్టిఫికెట్ [Ḍet sarṭiphikeṭ/Death certificate] (thriller)
- నివాలి [Nivāli] (thriller)

=== Comics ===
- 1995: గ్రింకిం జోక్స్ [Griṅkiṁ jōks/Drinking jokes]
- 1996: నేడే నవ్వండి [Nēḍē navvaṇḍi]
- 2001: స్మైల్ ప్లిజ్ [Smayil plīj/Smile please]
- 2009: Cidvilāsaṃ [Cidvilāsaṃ]
- నవ్వుల రవ్వలు [Navvula ravvalu]
- చిరునవ్వు చిరునామా [Chirunavvuku chirunaama]
- జోకులాష్టమి [Jōkulāṣṭami] (collection of jokes)
- హాస్యానదం [Hāsyānadaṁ]

=== Travelogues ===
- 1989: ట్రావెలాగ్ ఐరోపా [Ṭrāvelāg Yūrap/Travelogue Europe]
- 1990: ట్రావెలాగ్ అమెరికా [Ṭrāvelāg Amerikā/Travelogue America]
- 2004: హిమాలయం-మహిమాలయం [Himālayaṁ-mahimālayaṁ]
- 2008: అమెరికాలో మరోసారి [Amerikālo marōsāri]
- 2009: నర్మదా పరిక్రమ [Narmadā parikrama]
- 2011: దుబాయ్, టర్కీ మరియు గ్రీస్ యాత్రా వివరణ [Dubāy, ṭarkī mariyu grīs yātrā vivaraṇa/Travelogue Dubai, Turkey and Greece]
- 2011: ప్రయాణ వివరణ తూర్పు యూరప్ [Prayāṇa vivaraṇa tūrpu yūrap/Travelogue Eastern Europe]
- 2013: చైనా యాత్రా చరిత్ర [Cainā yātrā caritra/Travelogue China]
- 2013: ప్రయాణ వివరణ మెక్సికో [Prayāṇa vivaraṇa meksikō/Travelogue Mexico]
- 2014: ప్రయాణ వివరణ స్పెయిన్ మరియు పోర్చుగల్ [Prayāṇa vivaraṇa speyin mariyu pōrcugal/Travelogue Spain & Portugal]
- 2015: జపాన్ యాత్రా చరిత్ర [Japān yātrā caritra/Travelogue Japan]
- 2015: త్రవెలాగ్ జోర్డాన్ & ఇజిప్ట్ [Ṭravelāg Jōrḍan & Ījipṭ/Travelogue Jordan & Egypt]
- సింగపూర్ యాత్రా చరిత్ర [Siṅgapūr yātrā caritra/Travelogue Singapore]

=== Short story collections ===
- 1980: అక్షర శిల్పులు [Akṣara śilpulu]
- 1981: నీతిలేని మనుషులు [Nītilēni manuṣulu]
- 1983: ప్రేమిస్తే ఏమవుతుంది? [Prēmistē ēmavutundi?]
- 1984: మృత్యువగాడు [Mr̥tyuvagadu]
- 1985: 'కథా'కళి ['Kathā'kaḷi] – each story less than 500 words
- 1987: సగటు మనుషులు [Sagaṭu manuṣulu]
- 1987: నేరస్థులు [Nērasthulu]
- 1991: కథాకేళి [Kathakēli] – each story less than 500 words
- మల్లాది కథలు [Mallādi kathalu]

=== Translated short story collections ===
- 2010: Mini Crime Kathalu
- 2011: American Crime Stories
- 2011: Videsi Kathalu
- 2012: Murder Stories
- 2015: Manmadha Baanaalu
- Mystery Stories
- Chaavuki Chirunaama

=== Literary autobiographies ===
- 2014: జరిగిన కథ [Jarigina katha]
- 2020: నవల వెనక కథ [Navala Venuka Katha]
