= Teneteega =

- VCD Cover
- Directed by: M. Nanda Kumar
- Written by: Malladi Venkata Krishna Murthy (story / dialogues)
- Screenplay by: M. Nanda Kumar
- Produced by: J. V. Rama Rao; Uddanda Guru Prasad
- Starring: Rajendra Prasad; Suma Priya; Rekha; Sitara
- Cinematography: V. Suresh Kumar
- Edited by: Murali-Ramaiah
- Music by: Vidyasagar
- Production company: Suma Priya Creations
- Release date: 15 February 1991
- Running time: 142 mins
- Country: India
- Language: Telugu

Teneteega (transl. Honeybee) is a 1991 Telugu-language comedy film produced by J. V. Rama Rao and Uddanda Guru Prasad under the Suma Priya Creations banner and directed by M. Nanda Kumar. It stars Rajendra Prasad, Suma Priya, Rekha and Sitara, with music composed by Vidyasagar. The story was based on Malladi Venkata Krishna Murthy's novel of the same name.

== Cast ==
- Rajendra Prasad as Varun Kumar
- Suma Priya as Tanvi
- Rekha as Aparna
- Sithara as Amurtha
- Brahmanandam as Gokul
- Chakravarthy as Tryambakam
- Kallu Chidambaram as a detective
- Badi Tataji as Simham
- Kutty Padmini as Keertana
- Hema as Tapati
- Disco Shanthi as Pavala Kamala
- Ratna Sagar
- Kuyili as Visweswari
- Chandrika as receptionist

== Soundtrack ==
Teneteega

Film score by Vidyasagar
- Released: 1991
- Genre: Soundtrack
- Length: 26:32
- Label: LEO Audio
- Producer: Vidyasagar

Vidyasagar chronology
Minor Raja (1991)	Teneteega (1991)	Parishkaram (1991)

Music composed by Vidyasagar. Music released on LEO Audio Company.

No.	Title	Lyrics	Singer(s)	Length
1.	"A Ante Amala"	Bhuvana Chandra	S. P. Balasubrahmanyam	3:47
2.	"Gitcham Gitcham"	Vennelakanti	Mano, Chitra	5:32
3.	"Kalalo Thera"	Vennelakanti	S. P. Balasubrahmanyam, Chitra	3:50
4.	"Muddula Kavalaena"	Bhuvana Chandra	Rajendra Prasad, S. P. Sailaja	5:09
5.	"Pala Bugga"	Vennelakanti	SP Sailaja	4:19
6.	"Para Husharu"	Sirivennela Sitarama Sastry	S. P. Balasubrahmanyam	3:55
Total length:				26:32
