= Gandugali =

- VCD cover
- Directed by: C. H. Balaji Singh Babu
- Dialogues by: Pal Sudarshan
- Screenplay by: C. H. Balaji Singh Babu
- Story by: J. G. Krishna
- Produced by: J.G. Krishna; G. Govindu; K.C. Subramani Raju; Raghavendra
- Starring: Shiva Rajkumar; Nirosha; Pournami
- Cinematography: J.G. Krishna
- Edited by: R. Janardhan
- Music by: Sadhu Kokila
- Production company: Jyothi Chitra
- Release date: 23 December 1994
- Running time: 113 minutes
- Country: India
- Language: Kannada

Gandugali (transl. Knight) is a 1994 Indian Kannada-language action film directed by C. H. Balaji Singh Babu and written, co-produced by J.G. Krishna. The film stars Shiva Rajkumar and Nirosha. The music was composed by Sadhu Kokila.

== Plot ==
Mahesh, a kind-hearted slum dweller, lives a happy life with his friends and lover Sujatha. Mahesh clashes with Narendra due to some issues. Narendra is actually a smuggler running a smuggling business with his father Kailash. When Narendra kills Sujatha, Mahesha brutally kills Narendra, thus enraging Kailash. Kailash attacks the slum and kills Mahesh's friends, where he threatens the slum people to surrender Mahesh. Mahesh learns about this and also learns that Kailash was also responsible for his father Janardhana's death as Janardhana tried to report about Kailash's smuggling business to the authorities. Mahesh tracks down Kailash at his hideout and brutally kills him, thus avenging the death of his friends and Janardhana.

== Cast ==
- Shiva Rajkumar as Mahesh
- Nirosha as Sangeetha
- Pournami as Sujatha
- Rajeev as Kailash
- Ravikiran as Narendra
- Papamma
- Saraswati
- Prithviraj
- Agro Chikkanna
- Bank Janardhan as Sanna
- King Kong
- Shani Mahadevappa as Setty, shopkeeper
- Sihi Kahi Chandru
- K. V. Manjayya as Seth, shopkeeper
- Krishne Gowda as Mahadevappa
- S. Srinivas
- Sathyajith as Inspector Arjun
- Gurukiran as Sampath
- Govindu (Prajamatha)
- Subramani Raju K. C.
- M. S. Karanth as emcee
- Disco Shanti
- Sunil Raoh
- Pankaj Narayan
- Baby Chaithanya
- Madhu Bangarappa as himself in a cameo
- Jai Jagadish as police inspector in a cameo

== Soundtrack ==
The soundtrack of the film was composed by Sadhu Kokila. The song "Ee Jodi Nodi" is inspired from the song "Amma Dekh Tera Munda" from 1994 Hindi movie Stuntman.

Track listing
No.	Title	Lyrics	Singer(s)	Length
1.	"Something Special"		S. P. Balasubrahmanyam, K. S. Chithra
2.	"Ee Jodi Nodi"	Sriranga	S. P. Balasubrahmanyam, K. S. Chithra
3.	"Thampu Gali Maiya Soki"		S. P. Balasubrahmanyam, K. S. Chithra
4.	"Thaala Mela"	Hamsalekha	S. P. Balasubrahmanyam, Sadhu Kokila, Mangala
5.	"Ondu Mathanaadade"	Rudramurthy Shastry	Rajkumar
6.	"Ee Age Body"	Ramesh Rao	Suresh Peters
7.	"Mysore Dasara"		Sadhu Kokila, Mangala
