= Andamina Jeevitam =

Telugu novel by Malladi Venkata Krishna Murthy

Andamina Jeevitam is a Telugu novel by Malladi Venkata Krishna Murthy. This novel is about friendship between a man and a woman. The names of two characters in this novel are Shanthi and Priyatam. The story was adapted into 2023 Hindi movie 8 A.M. Metro starring Gulshan Devaiah and Saiyami Kher in pivotal roles.

== History ==
Andamina Jeevitam was written during the 1980s. Initially it was published as a serial in a magazine. Later it was published as a book. Final re-print of a revised version is released in the year 2010. In the 2011 same novel is released as e-book.
