= 8 A.M. Metro =

- Theatrical release poster
- Directed by: Raj Rachakonda
- Written by: Raj Rachakonda
- Based on: Andamina Jeevitam by Malladi Venkata Krishna Murthy
- Produced by: Raj Rachakonda; Kishore Ganji
- Starring: Gulshan Devaiah; Saiyami Kher
- Cinematography: Sunny Kurapati
- Edited by: Anil Aalayam
- Music by: Mark K. Robin
- Production company: Studio 99
- Distributed by: Platoon Distribution
- Release date: 19 May 2023
- Country: India
- Language: Hindi

8 A.M. Metro is a 2023 Indian Hindi-language drama film written and directed by Raj Rachakonda. The film stars Gulshan Devaiah and Saiyami Kher in pivotal roles. This film is inspired from Malladi Venkata Krishna Murthy's novel Andhamaina Jeevitham (trans| Life is Beautiful). The film tells the unusual story of two strangers who inadvertently bump into each other in the metro and strike up an unlikely friendship, in the process finding themselves and each other.

The film released theatrically on 19 May 2023 to positive reviews from critics.

== Plot ==
The film follows Iravati, a 29-year-old housewife whose mundane life in Nanded is turned upside down when she has to rush to Hyderabad to tend to her pregnant sister who is confined to the bed. Fighting off recurring panic attacks, she turns to Preetam, a banker with more to him than meets the eye, and the duo subsequently go on many journeys, finding solace in each other's company.

== Cast ==
- Gulshan Devaiah as Preetam
- Saiyami Kher as Iravati "Ira"
- Kalpika Ganesh as Mridula
- Umesh Kamat as Umesh
- Rajiv Kumar Aneja as writer
- Sandeep Bharadwaj as Abhiram
- Moin Jaan as Ira's Father
- Jay Jha as Partho
- Nimisha Nair as Riya
- Dheer Charan Srivastav as Iqbal
- Madhu Swaminath as Jaya

== Production ==
The film contains seven poems written by Gulzar.

=== Filming ===
Many scenes of the film were shot in Hyderabad Metro.

== Music ==
8 A.M. Metro

Soundtrack album by Mark K. Robin
- Released: 29 May 2023
- Genre: Feature film soundtrack
- Length: 22:43
- Language: Hindi
- Label: Sony Music India

Mark K. Robin chronology
The Ghost (2022)	8 A.M. Metro (2023)	My Name Is Shruthi (2023)

Official audio
- 8 A.M. Metro – Full Album on YouTube

The film's music is composed by Mark K Robin.

No.	Title	Lyrics	Singer(s)	Length
1.	"Woh Khuda"	Shahbaaz Khan, Manoj Juloori	Nooran Sisters	3:13
2.	"Ghoomey"	Manoj Juloori	Jubin Nautiyal	3:42
3.	"Phir Se Dil Toota"	Kausar Munir	Vishal Mishra	3:08
4.	"Hey Fikar"	Kausar Munir	Jonita Gandhi	3:01
5.	"Ghoomey (R&B Version)"	Manoj Juloori	R&B	3:17
6.	"Woh Khuda (Javed Ali Version)"	Shahbaaz Khan, Manoj Juloori	Javed Ali	3:27
7.	"Hey Fikar (Suzanne's Version)"	Kausar Munir	Suzanne D'Mello	2:55
Total length:				22:43

== Release ==
The film was theatrically released on 19 May 2023.

== Critical reception ==
8 A.M. Metro received positive reviews from critics.

On the review aggregator website Rotten Tomatoes, 78% of 9 critics' reviews are positive, with an average rating of 6.7/10.

Dhaval Roy of The Times of India gave the film 3.5 stars out of 5, stating that the film tells the meaning of life, life, loss and eventual healing. Grace Cycril of India Today gave the film 3.5 stars out of 5, stating that the film is like a group therapy session.
