= Phani Ramachandra =

Kannada film and television director

H.S. Phani Ramachandra
- Born: April 25, 1956 (age 70); Hosahalli Karnataka, India
- Occupation: Director actor

H. S. Phani Ramachandra is a Kannada film and television director. He is known for directing such classic Kannada comedy films as Ganeshana Maduve and Gauri Ganesha and the TV serial Danda Pindagalu. His films mainly portray middle class Karnataka society in a comic light.

== Career ==
He is particularly popular amongst a section of audience for his out of box narration movies. His very popular Kannada movies are Ganesha Subramanya, Gauri Ganesha, Ganeshana Maduve, Ganesha I Love You, Ganesha Matthe Banda, etc. Ananth Nag was a common lead actor in his movies always. He is very famous for serials: Danda Pindagalu, Daridra Lakshmiyaru, Maduve Maduve Maduve, Devru Devru Devru. His serial Daridra Lakshmiyaru landed in controversy after actor Vishnuvardhan objected to the title to be derogatory to women which led the channel to change the title of the series as Sahasa Lakshmiyaru.

He has made 3 Kannada movies based on the novels of Telugu writer Malladi Venkata Krishna Murthy - Ganeshana Maduve based on Vinayaka Rao Pelli, Gauri Ganesha based on Wedding Bells and Nanendu Nimmavane based on Repati Kodaku (Little Rascal). Also Ganesha I Love You was based on a story by actor Vishnuvardhan with the core plot elements adapted from Rendu Rella Aaru by Malladi Venkata Krishna Murthy.

== Filmography ==
=== Films ===
==== Director ====
- Doctor Krishna (1989)
- Ganeshana Maduve (1990)
- Gauri Ganesha (1991)
- Ganesha Subramanya (1992)
- Ondu Cinema Kathe (1992)
- Urvashi Kalyana (1992)
- Nanendu Nimmavane (1993)
- Jeevithame Oka Cinema (1993) (Telugu)
- Ganeshana Galate (1995)
- Annavra Makkalu (1996)
- Choobaana (1997)
- Ganesha I Love You (1997)
- Ammavra Ganda (1997)
- Ganesha Matte Banda (2008)

==== Story only ====
- Hrudaya Geethe (1988)
- Makkala Sainya (1994)

=== Television ===
- Beedige Biddavaru
- Jagalagantiyaru
- Sahasa Lakshmiyaru (initially titled Daridra Lakshmiyaru)
- Prema Pichachigalu
- Dandapindagalu
- Devru Devru Devru
- Trin Trin Trin
- Maduve Maduve Maduve
- Duddu Duddu Duduu
