= Kumbakonam Gopalu =

- Title card
- Directed by: Keyaar
- Written by: N. Prasannakumar (dialogues)
- Screenplay by: Keyaar
- Based on: Gauri Ganesha
- Produced by: A. V. Subba Rao
- Starring: Pandiarajan; Mayuri; Janagaraj; Thyagu
- Cinematography: B. L. Rao
- Edited by: Shyam Mukherjee
- Music by: Ilaiyaraaja
- Production company: Prasath Art Productions
- Release date: 26 November 1998
- Running time: 135 minutes
- Country: India
- Language: Tamil

Kumbakonam Gopalu is a 1998 Indian Tamil-language film written and directed by Keyaar, starring Pandiarajan, Mayoori, Janagaraj and Thyagu. It is a remake of the 1991 Kannada film Gauri Ganesha. Child actor Mahendran won the Tamil Nadu State Film Award for Best Child Artist.

== Plot ==
Gopal is a petty trickster who cheats and lies to make a false living. One day, he turns himself into an hospital, faking an abdominal issue, solely to get free lodging and food, and also his love interest Geetha. At the hospital Gopal comes across a recent patient named Sangeetha who had died of suicide. Gopal gets a sudden idea and he decides to take her belongings and make some money of them, but instead finds her diary. He realises that Sangeetha had come across 3 men who had significant influence in her life. The first man was her former boss who had proposed indecently to sleep with her. The second man wanted her to pretend that they were married to fool his parents in return for money for Sangeetha's sister's marriage. The last man was a friend of the 2nd man, and thought that he had slept with her in a drunken state. The truth is that none of the men had any physical contact with her. Gopal devises a plan to extract money from these men and their families. He writes letters to them stating that Sangeetha has given birth to their son and named him Krishna/Ramakrishnan/Rajasekhar. After a series of funny events, (such as the three booking almost neighbouring rooms on the same floor of the same hotel) all the three come to meet Gopal on the same day, and the film ends when Gopal realizes his mistake.

== Cast ==
- Pandiarajan as Gopal
- Mayuri as Geetha
- Janagaraj as Lingamurthy
- Kavitha as Ranganayaki
- Thyagu
- Alex as Kannappan Nadar
- Singamuthu as Man travelling to Anna Nagar
- Vinu Chakravarthy as Rajasekhar
- Master Mahendran as L. Krishna/Ramakrishnan/Rajasekhar
- Typist Gopu as Tenant
- Omakuchi Narasimhan as Previous Tenant
- Loose Mohan as Colony resident
- Sangita in Guest appearance

== Soundtrack ==
The music was composed by Ilaiyaraaja. The song "Oru Nandhavanam" was reused version of Ilayaraja's own Malayalam song "Manikuttikurumbulla" from the Malayalam film Kaliyoonjal.

Song	Singers	Lyrics	Length (m:ss)
"Butter Fly Oh"	Swarnalatha, P. Unnikrishnan	Kamakodiyan	04:52
"Enna Genmamo"	Ilaiyaraaja	Ponnadiyan	05:01
"Golmal Gopal"	Karthik Raja, Yuvan Shankar Raja	Vaasan	04:57
"Oru Nandavanam"	Ilaiyaraaja	Vaasan	04:48
"Super Pattu Mettu"	P. Unnikrishnan, Master Mukunth	Mu. Metha	04:45

== Release and reception ==
A critic from Deccan Herald wrote "I can't find a word that can aptly describe this film — vulgar, tacky, obscene would all fit, but its worse than all that put together. This is one of those really disgusting films that leaves a stain on your mind". In contrast, a reviewer from The Hindu wrote the director's "approach in the second- half however enlivens the film". Two years after release, the producers were given a ₹5 lakh (equivalent to ₹21 lakh or US$24,000 in 2023) subsidy by the Tamil Nadu government along with several other films.
