= Honnasandra =

Village in Karnataka, India

Honnasandra is a village in Bangalore Urban district. As of the 2011 India census, Hommasandra had a population of 1,059, made up of 541 males and 518 females. The literacy rate is 62.13%. Out of those who are literate are 70.43% male and 53.47% female.
