= Puttur Narasimha Nayak =

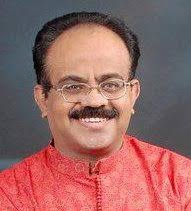

Background information
- Born: Narasimha Nayak; November 28, 1958 (age 67); Puttur, Karnataka, India
- Genres: Playback singing, Bhajans, Kirthanas, Indian classical
- Occupation: Singer/Vocalist

Puttur Narasimha Nayak is a Kannada and Konkani singer and vocalist from Karnataka. He sings devotional songs, chiefly Haridasa compositions, and Carnatic classical music. To his credit, he has rendered in Kannada, mainly devotional songs and kirthanas by Purandara Dasa, Kanaka Dasa and has given many public concerts all over the world. His "Pavamana Jagada Prana" album was extremely popular.

== Personal life ==
Born in a Gowd Saraswat Brahmin family, Nayak began to learn music at the age of 14. He took his initial lessons in music from Puttur Devdas Nayak.

He is a native of Dakshina Kannada district. He lives with his wife and two children in Bangalore.

== Career ==
In 1977, he started singing for Konkani, Kannada and Tulu films including Kendada Male, Ujwadu and music by L. Vaidyanathan, Gauri Ganesha, and Rajan–Nagendra. Puttur Nayak won the award for Best Male Playback Singer at the Karnataka State Film Awards in 1992. He was awarded the Sri Raghavendra award in 2005. He has sung more than ten thousand devotional, motion picture, and folk songs in 14 Indian languages. He has performed in more than three thousand concerts across the world. He has toured the US and Bahrain several times and served as a representative in the Kannada conferences abroad.

== List of Audio released ==
- 108 Shiva Chants – Puttur Narasimha Nayak (Sanskrit)
- Basava Basava (Basaveshwara Vachana) – Puttur Narasimha Nayak, BR Chaya, Kasturi Shankar
- Bhagya Pradayini Goravanahalli Shri Lakshmi by Puttur Narasimha Nayak, KS Surekha, BR Chaya
- Bhagyada Ganapa Barayya by Puttur Narasimha Nayak
- Bilwastothara Shatanamavali (Sanskrit) by Puttur Narasimha Nayak
- Bilwastothara Shatanamavali (Sanskrit) by Puttur Narasimha Nayak
- Daasanaagu Sung by Putturu Narasimha Nayak
- Daasara Padagalu Vol 1 – Puttur Narasimha Nayak
- Dasakirthana (Dasara Padagalu) – Puttur Narasimha Nayak
- Gururaja Gurusarvabhouma (Dasara Padagalu) – Puttur Narasimha Nayak
- Hari Dasara Sri Raghavendra Nama Vali by Puttur Narasimha Nayak
- Jaganmohanane Krishna (Dasara Padagalu) by Puttur Narasimha Nayak
- Jai Jai Krishna Mukunda Murari (Bhajans) – Puttur Narasimha Nayak
- Jayathu Jayathu Raghavendra Puttur Narasimha Nayak
- Sri Lakshmi Hrudaya Stotra – Puttur Narasimha Nayak
- Madhwanama – Puttur Narasimha Nayak
- Mungodadha Madeshwara – Puttur Narasimha Nayak, Sowmya
- Olidu Baarayya Raghavendra by Puttur Narasimha Nayak
- Om Gam Ganapatheye Namaha – Chantings by Puttur Narasimha Nayak
- Paliso Venkataramana (Dasara Padagalu) – Puttur Narasimha Nayak
- Raaya Baaro Raghavendra Baaro (Dasara Pada) by Puttur Narasimha Nayak
- Rama Hare Krishna Hare (Dasara Padagalu) – Puttur Narasimha Nayak
- Shri Raghavendram (Sanskrit) by Puttur Narasimha Nayak
- Sindhoora Ganapa by Vani Jayaram, Chandrika Gururaj, Puttur Narasimha Nayak
- Sri Ganesha Divya Darshana by Puttur Narasimha Nayak, BR Chaya, Soumya
- Sri Ganesha Suprabhatha by Puttur Narasimha Nayak, BR Chaya, KS Surekha
- Dasa Sangama Puttur Narasimha Nayak,
- Pavamana Puttur Narasimha Nayak,
