= Ganesha I Love You =

- DVD cover
- Directed by: Phani Ramachandra
- Written by: Vishnuvardhan
- Starring: Ananth Nag; Ravinder Mann; Sithara
- Cinematography: R Manjunath
- Edited by: Basavaraj Urs (Shivu), B S Kemparaj
- Music by: Rajesh Ramanath
- Production company: GRK Creations
- Release date: 1997
- Country: India
- Language: Kannada

Ganesha I Love You is a 1997 Kannada film directed by Phani Ramachandra where he uses his favorite screen-title Ganesha. Ananth Nag reprised the titular character. The movie was based on a story by actor Vishnuvardhan with core plot elements adapted from the novel Rendu Rella Aaru by Malladi Venkata Krishna Murthy.

== Plot ==
Sunad Raj and Sithara had never met before. After exchanging letters, they decided to meet in person, convinced that they were in love. However, they both thought they were ugly. They asked Ananth Nag and Ravinder Mann to represent them, but it turned out that they had a dark past.

== Cast ==
- Ananth Nag as Ganesha
- Sithara
- Ravinder Mann
- Sunad Raj
- Girija Lokesh
- Bank Janardhan
- Ramesh Pandit (uncredited)

== Soundtrack ==
The soundtrack of the film was composed by Rajesh Ramanath.

Track listing
| No. | Title | Lyrics | Singer(s) | Length |
|---|---|---|---|---|
| 1. | "Kaveramma" | M. N. Vyasa Rao | K. S. Chithra | 4:37 |
| 2. | "Haalugenneya" | Shyamasundara Kulakarni | S. P. Balasubrahmanyam | 4:55 |
| 3. | "Devaninda Maheyendu Yaru" | Shyamasundara Kulakarni | K. S. Chithra | 4:38 |
| 4. | "Avane Nanna Hero" | Shyamasundara Kulakarni | Manjula Gururaj, Chandrika Gururaj | 4:17 |
| 5. | "Huttabaaradu" | Shyamasundara Kulakarni | S. P. Balasubrahmanyam, K. S. Chithra | 4:29 |
| 6. | "Swargakkinnu Moore Mettilu" | J. M. Prahlad | S. P. Balasubrahmanyam | 4:54 |
| 7. | "Nanage Hallubbu Illadiddare" | Shyamasundara Kulakarni | S. P. Balasubrahmanyam, Manjula Gururaj | 4:46 |
| Total length: | | | | 32:36 |
