= Ondu Cinema Kathe =

- Directed by: Phani Ramachandra
- Written by: Shyamasundara Kulkarni
- Produced by: B. S. Krishna Maadhe Gowda
- Starring: Ananth Nag; Anjana; Mukhyamantri Chandru
- Cinematography: B. S. Singh
- Edited by: Suresh Urs
- Music by: Rajan–Nagendra
- Production company: Gayathri Cine Creations
- Release date: 1992
- Running time: 134 minutes
- Country: India
- Language: Kannada

Ondu Cinema Kathe (transl. A film story) is a 1992 Indian Kannada-language film, directed by Phani Ramachandra and written by Shyamasundara Kulkarni. The film stars Ananth Nag, Anjana, Abhilasha and Mukhyamantri Chandru. The music was composed by Rajan–Nagendra and the dialogues were written by Chi. Udayashankar. Ramachandra remade it in Telugu as Jeevithame Oka Cinema (1993).

== Cast ==
- Ananth Nag as Shyamsundar Kulkarni
- Anjana as Radha
- Abhilasha as Ganga
- Mukhyamantri Chandru as Film Producer
- Ramesh Bhat as Ramesh Bhat
- M. S. Umesh

== Soundtrack ==
All songs were composed by Rajan–Nagendra for the lyrics of Chi. Udaya Shankar. The soundtrack was hugely successful upon release.

- "Kannada Honnudi" – S. P. Balasubrahmanyam. Lyrics : Shyamsundar Kulkarni
- "Ondu Mutthu" – Narasimha Nayak, Manjula Gururaj
- "Olavina Prema Gange" – S. P. Balasubrahmanyam
- "Belli Belaku Moodide" – B. R. Chaya
