= Bindaas (2008 film) =

2008 Indian Kannada-language film

- Theatrical release poster
- Directed by: D. Rajendra Babu
- Screenplay by: D. Rajendra Babu
- Dialogues by: Malavalli Saikrishna
- Story by: Janardhana Maharshi
- Produced by: M. Chandrashekar
- Starring: Puneeth Rajkumar; Hansika Motwani
- Cinematography: H. C. Venu
- Edited by: T. Shashikumar
- Music by: Gurukiran
- Production company: Udayachandra Productions
- Distributed by: Jayanna Films
- Release date: 15 February 2008
- Running time: 146 minutes
- Country: India
- Language: Kannada

Bindaas (transl. Independent) is a Kannada-language action comedy film directed by D. Rajendra Babu and produced by M. Chandrashekar under Udayachandra Productions. The film stars Puneeth Rajkumar, alongside Hansika Motwani (in her Kannada debut), Nassar, Suman and Rahul Dev. The soundtrack and score was composed by Gurukiran, while the cinematography and editing were handled by H. C. Venu and T. Shashikumar respectively.

Bindaas was released on 15 February 2008, received mixed-to-positive reviews, and became a box office success. The film was dubbed in Telugu as Pandugadu, in Hindi as Be Happy Bindaas and in Bhojpuri as Baazi. It was also reported to have been dubbed in Malayalam. Despite being dubbed in Bhojpuri, it was remade as Hero, making it the first Kannada film to be remade in that language.

== Plot ==
Shiva, a happy-go-lucky guy in Bangalore, is summoned by ACP Vikram Rathod. Vikram tells Shiva about Saleem Bhai, a notorious crime boss, and asks him to infiltrate Saleem's gang as a police informer. Shiva accepts and joins the gang of D, Saleem's trusted henchman. Shiva eliminates Saleem's gang under Vikram's orders and also catches Saleem's mole in the police department. Shiva's girlfriend Preethi sees Shiva at a shootout, where she mistakes him as a gangster in a shootout and breaks up with him. After capturing and bringing Saleem, Shiva is held at gunpoint by Vikram, who reveals that Preeti is his daughter. Vikram reveals that he was enraged about Shiva and Preethi's relationship earlier and wanted to separate them. Due to political pressure to nab Saleem, Vikram made Shiva the informer in order to make Preeti believe that Shiva was a gangster. After revealing this, Vikram is about to shoot Shiva, but Shiva escapes with Saleem and kidnaps Preeti, who reveals her father's treachery. D arrives at Shiva's hideout and frees Saleem. A shootout ensues in which Shiva kills D and Saleem. In the aftermath, Preethi happily reunites with Shiva.

== Cast ==
- Puneeth Rajkumar as Shiva
- Hansika Motwani as Preethi
- Nassar as ACP Vikram Rathod, Preethi's father
- Suman as Saleem Bhai
- Rahul Dev as D
- Komal as Shiva's friend
- Ramesh Bhat as SI
- Dattanna as a priest
- Vanitha Vasu
- Prithviraj
- Suman Ranganathan in a cameo appearance in the song "Kallu Mama"

== Soundtrack ==
Bindaas

Soundtrack album by Gurukiran
- Released: 2 January 2008
- Recorded: 2007
- Genre: Feature film soundtrack
- Length: 22:39
- Label: Anand Audio
External audio
- Official Audio Jukebox on YouTube

Gurukiran composed the film score and soundtrack, while the lyrics were penned by Kaviraj and V. Nagendra Prasad. The soundtrack album consists of five tracks and was released on 2 January 2008 in Bangalore. The song "Thara Thara Onthara" samples the post-chorus of "My Number One".

No.	Title	Lyrics	Singer(s)	Length
1.	"Gubbachi Goodinalli"	Kaviraj	Udit Narayan, Sowmya Raoh	4:48
2.	"Bengalooru Mangalooru"	V. Nagendra Prasad	Puneeth Rajkumar	4:12
3.	"Kallu Mama"	Kaviraj	Gurukiran, Sonu Kakkar	3:51
4.	"Nalle Nalle"	Kaviraj	Karthik, Mathangi	4:48
5.	"Thara Thara Onthara"	Kaviraj	Shaan	4:50
Total length:				22:39

== Reception ==
=== Critical response ===
The Times of India wrote "The director has stuck to the old formula of five songs, a couple of dishum dishum sequences combined with soppy sentimentality." India Forums wrote "Bindaas is a passable entertainer, but the action flick could have done with punchy dialogues from Malavalli Sai Krishna." RGV of Nowrunning wrote "Bindaas may be lapped up by ardent Puneet Rajkumar fans, but in totality it lacks the elements of a good action entertainer." R. G. Vijayasarathy of Rediff praised Puneeth Rajkumar's performance, "superbly executed fights", cinematography and music, but criticized its script and dialogues.
