= Gauri Ganesha =

- Video cover
- Directed by: Phani Ramachandra
- Screenplay by: Phani Ramachandra
- Based on: Wedding Bells by Malladi Venkata Krishna Murthy
- Produced by: Vishwa Sagara
- Starring: Anant Nag; Shruti; Master Anand; Vinaya Prasad; Mukhyamantri Chandru; Ramesh Bhat
- Cinematography: R. Manjunath
- Edited by: Suresh Urs
- Music by: Rajan–Nagendra
- Release date: 1991
- Country: India
- Language: Kannada

Gauri Ganesha is a 1991 Kannada-language comedy drama film directed by Phani Ramachandra. It stars Anant Nag, Vinaya Prasad, Master Anand, Mukhyamantri Chandru, Vaishali Kasaravalli, Ramesh Bhat among others.

Anant Nag received Best Actor Filmfare Award (Kannada) for this movie. The story is based on Malladi Venkata Krishna Murthy's Telugu comedy novel Wedding Bells. The movie was remade in Telugu in 1992 as Golmaal Govindam and in Tamil in 1998 as Kumbakonam Gopalu.

== Plot ==
Lambodhara is a petty trickster who cheats and lies to make a false living. One day, he admits himself into a hospital, faking an abdominal issue, solely to get free lodging and food, and also the care of his love interest Saraswathi or Sarasu (Vinaya Prasad). At the hospital Lambodhara comes across a recent patient named Gauri who has died of heart failure. Lambodhara gets a sudden idea and he decides to take her belongings and make some money off them, but instead he finds her diary. He realizes that Gauri has come across 3 men who had significant influence in her life. The first man was her former boss who had proposed indecently to sleep with her. The second man wanted her to pretend that they are married to fool his parents in return for money for her heart treatment. The last man is a friend of the 2nd man, and thought that he had slept with her in a drunken state. The truth is that none of the men had any physical contact with her. Lambodhar devises a plan to extract money from these men and their families. He writes letters to them stating that Gauri has given birth to their son and named him Ganesh. After a series of funny events, (such as the three men booking almost neighbouring rooms on the same floor of the same hotel) all three come to meet Lambodhar on the same day, and the film ends when Lambodhar blackmails them into submission.

== Cast ==
- Anant Nag as Lambodhara
- Vinaya Prasad as Nurse Saraswathi, wife of Lambodhara
- Shruti as Gauri
- Mukhyamantri Chandru as Poornananda Rao, father of Chandramouli
- Ramesh Bhat as Madhusudan alias Madhu, Friend of Chandramouli
- Umesh Navale as Chandramouli, son of Poornananda Rao and Vishalakshi
- Sihi Kahi Chandru as Anand Rao, employer of Gowri
- Vaishali Kasaravalli as Vishalakshi, Wife of Poornananda Rao, Mother of Chandramouli
- Master Anand as Ganesha/A. Ganesh/M. Ganesh/Chandramouli Jr.
- Ratnakar as Rathnakara, Lambodhar's neighbour
- Bengaluru Nagesh as Photo Studio owner
- Bank Janardhan as House owner of Lambodhara
- Shivaprakash as Chandramouli
- M. S. Umesh as Supplier at Ashoka Hotel, Bangalore
- B.K. Shankar
- Shobha Raghavendra as Step-Mother of Gowri

== Soundtrack ==
The music was composed by Rajan–Nagendra. A song from the film references actors, writers and composers. Rajesh Krishnan made his singing debut with this film at the age of 17.

Track listing
No.	Title	Singer(s)	Length
1.	"Daddy Daddy Daddy"	Kusuma	4:01
2.	"Mathinalle Gellaballe"	Rajesh Krishnan	4:06
3.	"Nimma Maguvu Naguthiruva"	Puttur Narasimha Nayak	5:18
4.	"Ondu Oorali Obba Cheluveyu"	G. V. Atri	6:55
Total length:			20:30

== Awards ==
Karnataka State Film Awards

- Best Male Playback Singer — Puttur Narasimha Nayak for "Nimma Maguvu Naguthiruva"
- Best Child Actor (Male) — Master Anand
- Best Dialogue — Kunigal Nagabhushan

Filmfare Awards South

- Best Film – Kannada
- Best Actor – Kannada — Anant Nag
