= Vishnuvardhan (actor) =

Indian Kannada actor (1950–2009)

- Born: Sampath Kumar; 18 September 1950; Mysore, Mysore State (Now Karnataka), India
- Died: 30 December 2009 (aged 59); Mysore, Karnataka, India
- Occupations: Actor, singer, writer
- Years active: 1972–2009
- Works: Full list
- Spouse: Bharathi Rao (m. 1975)
- Children: 2
- Relatives: Aniruddha Jatkar (son-in-law)
- Awards: Karnataka Ratna; Honorary Doctorate – (2005) Bangalore University; Indira Prathishtan National Award; Karnataka State Film Awards; Rajyotsava Award – 1990; Filmfare Awards South; Filmfare Special Award – South; Filmfare Lifetime Achievement Award – South – 2002

Sampath Kumar (18 September 1950 – 30 December 2009), known by his stage name Vishnuvardhan, was an Indian actor who worked predominantly in Kannada cinema besides also having sporadically appeared in Tamil, Hindi, Telugu and Malayalam language films. Vishnuvardhan had a prolific career spanning over four decades, during which he acted in more than 220 films. A popular cultural icon of Karnataka, he holds the status of a matinée idol among the Kannada diaspora. He is popularly called as Sāhasa Simha, Dada and The Angry Young Man of Kannada Cinema. Vishnuvardhan's contributions to Kannada cinema have been praised by his contemporaries in the Indian film industry. The Government of Karnataka honoured him with the highest civilian awards of Karnataka State, the Karnataka Ratna Award in 2025, Rajyotsava Prashasti in 1990 and the Dr. Rajkumar Lifetime Achievement Award in 2007 for his contributions to Kannada cinema. He was called The Phoenix of Indian Cinema. In 2008, a poll conducted by CNN-IBN listed Vishnuvardhan as the most popular star in the Kannada film industry.

Vishnuvardhan made his acting and on-screen debut at age 21 in B. V. Karanth and Girish Karnad's Vamsha Vriksha in 1971. In 1972, he attained stardom after starring in Puttanna Kanagal's Naagarahaavu . By the late-1970s, he established himself as a bankable leading actor after starring several successful films throughout the 70's, the crime drama Sahasa Simha released in 1982 catapulted him into superstardom in Karnataka. He predominantly works in Kannada films, but he has also appeared in some of Hindi, Tamil, Telugu and Malayalam films. Some of his best known non-Kannada films include the Tamil mythological Sri Raghavendrar (1985) and the Malayalam crime thriller Kauravar (1992). He was also the story writer of the 1997 film Ganesha I Love You directed by Phani Ramachandra.

Vishnuvardhan has won seven Filmfare Award South – six Best Actor and one Filmfare Lifetime Achievement Award – South, three Cinema Express Awards for Best Actor and eight Karnataka State Film Awards—seven Best Actor and one Dr. Rajkumar Lifetime Achievement Award. He has won the second most number of Best Actor awards at the Karnataka State Film Awards, behind Dr. Rajkumar. As an acknowledgment of his service to Indian cinema, the state government named its annual lifetime achievement award to long-serving film personalities after Vishnuvardhan, renaming it as the Karnataka State Dr. Vishnuvardhan Award. A road stretching 14.5 kilometres (9.0 miles) from Banashankari Temple to Kengeri in Bangalore was named after him. It is the longest road in India to be named after an actor.

== Early life ==
Vishnuvardhan was born in Mysore to H. L. Narayana Rao and Kamakshamma. His father was an artist and music composer who was known for his collection of musical instruments and was also a screenwriter who had written dialogues for the 1961 Kannada movie Nagarjuna as well as story, screenplay, dialogues and lyrics for the 1962 Kannada movie Vidhivilasa. He had six siblings. His sister Rama was a Kathak dancer at the Mysore Palace, and brother Ravi was a child actor who appeared in the 1955 Tamil – Kannada bilingual film Modala Thedi. Vishnuvardhan was educated first in Mysore's Gopalswamy School and then at Bangalore's Kannada Model High School. He attended high school and obtained a degree from National College, Basavanagudi, Bangalore.

Vishnuvardhan married actress Bharathi on 27 February 1975 in Bangalore. They have two adopted daughters, Keerthi and Chandana. Actor Aniruddha Jatkar is married to Keerthi Vishnuvardhan.

== Career ==
=== Early career and debut (1971–1980) ===
Vishnuvardhan started his career with the National Award-winning movie Vamshavruksha (1971) directed by Girish Karnad based on the novel by S. L. Bhyrappa. His first lead role was in Naagarahaavu, directed by Puttanna Kanagal and based on a trilogy by T. R. Subba Rao. He won the Karnataka State Film Award for Best Actor for this film. Next, he appeared along with Rajkumar in Gandhada Gudi (1972). It got a stupendous reception at the box office. In 1974, he appeared in Bhootayyana Maga Ayyu which is considered an important milestone in the history of Kannada cinema. He appeared in many Kannada movies of which three were with Rajinikanth who was then a budding star – Sahodarara Savaal (1977), Galate Samsara (1977) and Kiladi Kittu (1978). He acted in the hit romantic drama Hombisilu (1978) and his role of a doctor fetched him his second Karnataka State Film Award for Best Actor. During the 70s, Vishnuvardhan formed a successful pair with not only his actress wife Bharathi, but also the two top actresses of the decade – Aarathi and Manjula. He was in Tamil films like Alaigal (1973) and Mazhalai Pattalam (1980).

=== Superstardom (1981–1999) ===
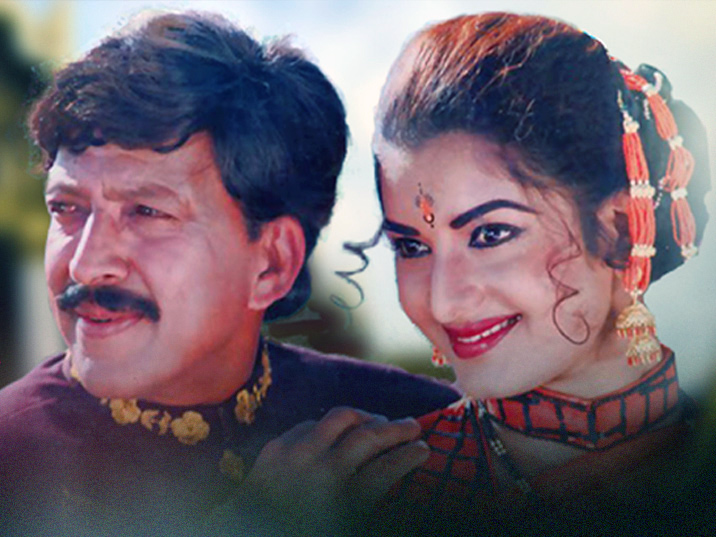
Vishnuvardhan with Prema in 1997 Kannada film Ellaranthalla Nanna Ganda

He made his debut in Malayalam cinema in 1981 with Adima Changala.

In 1982, the Joe Simon directed Sahasa Simha became a blockbuster and bestowed the title of Sahasa Simha on him.

In 1984, Bandhana, where he appeared with Suhasini Maniratnam had him play a doctor again but as a dejected lover. The film was not only a blockbuster but also fetched him his third Karnataka State Film Award for Best Actor and became another turning point in his career.

A number of his films in the 1980s like Onde Guri, Khaidi, Nee Bareda Kadambari, Jeevana Chakra, Malaya Marutha, Suprabhatha, Hrudaya Geethe and Deva were successful at the box-office.

He appeared in Tamil films with Vijayakanth in Eetti (1985) with Rajinikanth in Sri Raghavendrar (1985) and the next year in the multi-starrer Viduthalai (1986) co-starring Sivaji Ganesan as well.

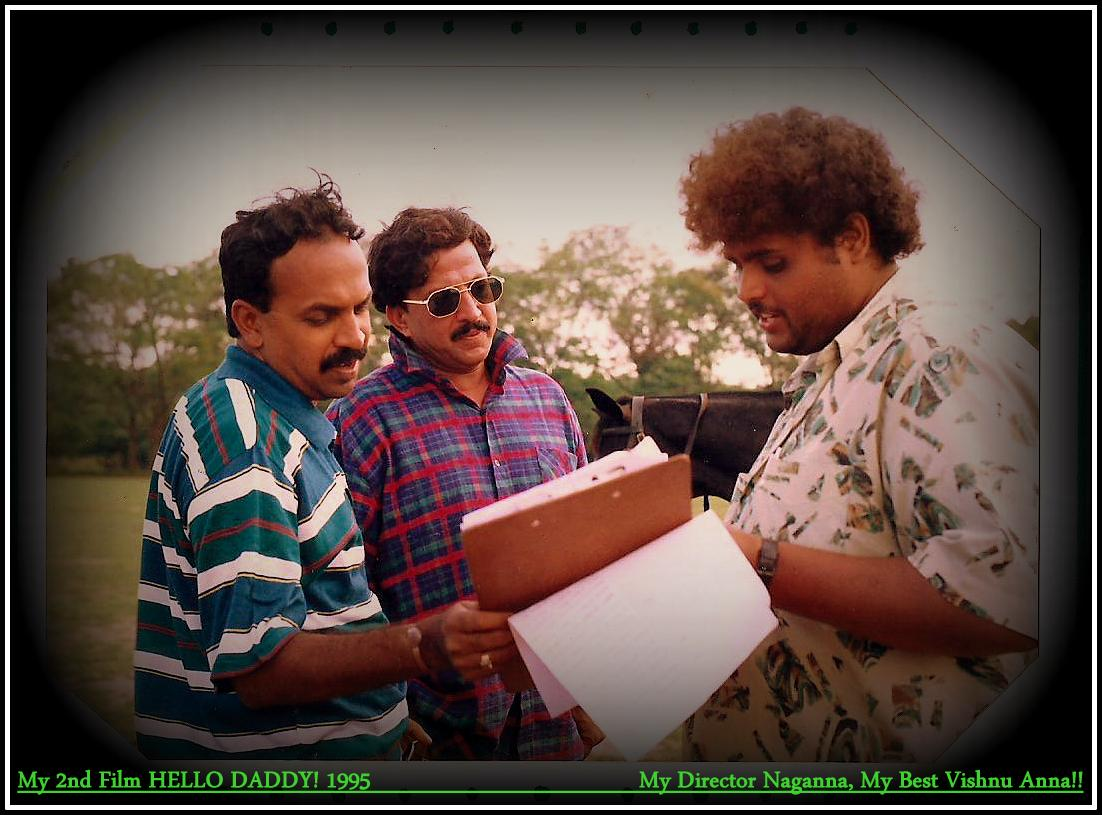
Naganna (left), Vishnuvardhan (center), Ravi Srivatsa (right)

In 1990, Muthina Haara – the National award-winning film (38th National Film Awards) directed by S. V. Rajendra Singh Babu (who had earlier given him the blockbuster Bandhana) got him rave reviews but was an average grosser at the box office, while Mathe Haadithu Kogile where he costarred with Anant Nag for the first time became a super hit. In 1991, he appeared in a double role in Lion Jagapathi Rao for which he received yet his fourth Karnataka State Film Award for Best Actor. In 1992 he appeared in the National award-winning film Harakeya Kuri directed by K. S. L. Swamy He once again forayed into Hindi cinema appearing in the Hindi-Kannada bilingual Vishnu Vijaya (titled Ashaant in Hindi) and Zaalim along with then rising star Akshay Kumar. The drama film Halunda Tavaru which was released in 1994 was a blockbuster. Other significant movies in the late 1990s include Laali (1997), Habba (1999), Surya Vamsha (1999), during this time, while he acted with almost all the notable actresses of the South industry, he formed the most successful pair with Maadhavi, Bhavya, Suhasini, Rupini and Sithara.

In S. Narayan's Veerappa Nayaka (1999), he played the titular role and appeared as a principled and patriotic village leader. Critic Y. Maheshwara Reddy of the New Indian Express wrote, "This film may remain as one of the best films of Vishnuvardhan's career. With his mature acting, the film's story has been handled with the right touch. He never indulges in overacting." Vishnuvardhan's performance earned him the Karnataka State Award for Best Actor. However, he rejected the award following a phone call by a member on the award panel, who suggested having "...recommended my name for the best actor's award."

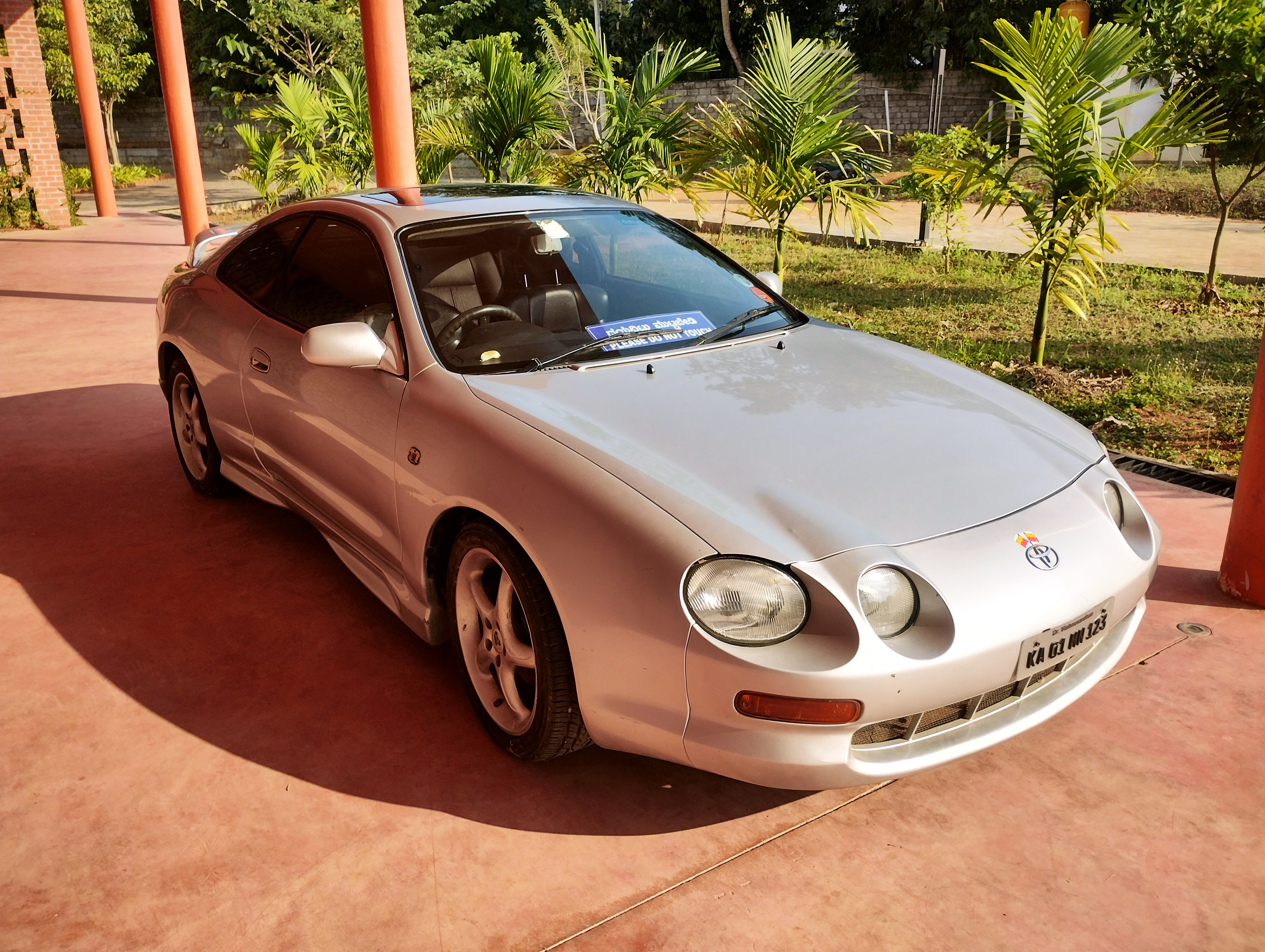
A Toyota car owned by the actor, displayed in Dr. Vishnuvardhan Memorial, Mysore (2025)

=== Last years of success (2000–2010) ===
In 2000, his other big hit that year was Soorappa. Yajamana was a huge box office success and became the all-time highest grossing Kannada movie. Over the next few years Vishnuvardhan continued to give more successful films like Diggajaru (2001), Kotigobba (2001), Jamindaru (2002), Simhadriya Simha (2002), Kadamba (2004) and most importantly Apthamitra (2004) which turned out to be the last film of Soundarya who costarred with him. In 2007, Ee Bandhana costarring Jaya Prada directed by actress Vijayalakshmi Singh, and Maathaad Maathaadu Mallige directed by Nagathihalli Chandrashekhar co-starring Sudeepa, got him a lot of acclaim for portraying him in age appropriate roles. He also appeared in Neenello Naanalle with his son-in-law Aniruddha Jatkar. In 2009 Bellary Naga was his last movie to release before his death. Aptharakshaka (2010) & School Master (2010) which was released posthumously became a huge blockbuster. In his 37-year career, he played a variety of roles in more than 200 films.

== Television career ==
He appeared on television for the first time in the 1980s. Shankar Nag directed Malgudi Days and introduced Vishnuvardhan as the main character Venkat Rao, in an episode called Rupees Forty-five a Month. Here, his co-star was Gayatri Nag.

== Philanthropy ==
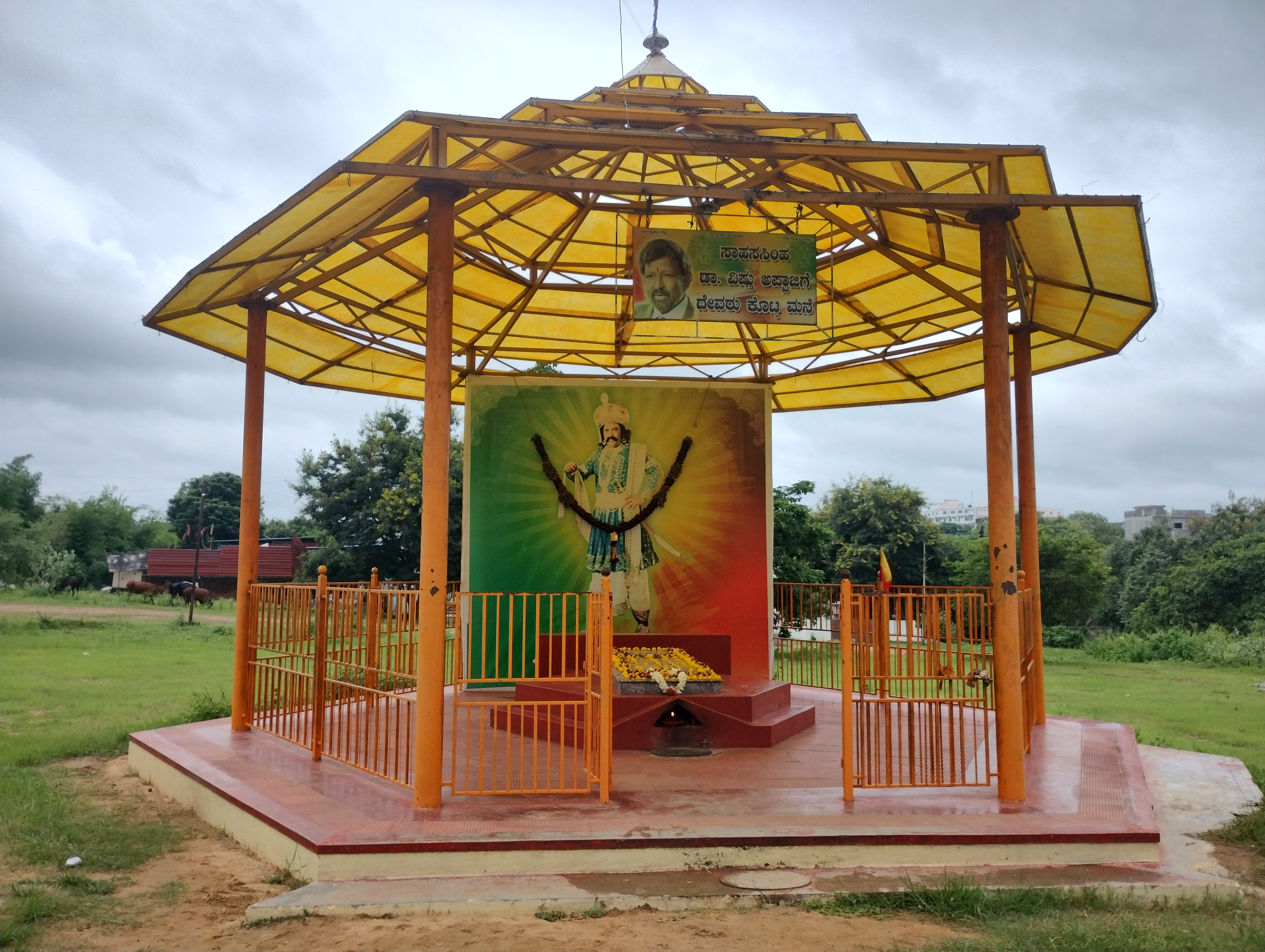
Memorial of Dr. Vishnuvardhan, Abhiman studio, Bengaluru (July 2024)

Vishnuvardhan started an organisation called Sneha Loka to promote harmony and to help during calamities like floods. He conducted a padayatra to collect funds for the flood-affected people in the northern part of the state. Vishnuvardhan and his wife Bharathi had adopted the Melukote town in Mandya district where he had borewells dug in the water-starved temple town. Many of his other charitable donations were revealed only when the beneficiaries came forward and spoke about it. In January 2005, Vishnuvardhan, cricketer Syed Kirmani and Shivram participated in a Cancer Awareness Walkathon organised by Bangalore Institute of Oncology (BIO) to commemorate its 15 years of public service in Bangalore.

== Frequent collaboration ==
S. P. Balasubrahmanyam

SPB started singing for Vishnuvardhan in the 1972 film Naagarahaavu. Balasubrahmanyam as music director, composed all the songs for Vishnuvardhan's Sowbhagyalakshmi. Balasubrahmanyam has sung all the five songs in his last Kannada film Aptharakshaka and was awarded the Best Playback Singer Filmfare Award for the song Gharane Ghara Gharane. He dedicated his award to Vishnuvardhan. After Vishnuvardhan's death, Balasubrahmanyam paid tribute to him in musical nights.

H. R. Bhargava

Vishnuvardhan's pairing with director H.R. Bhargava is considered one of the best pairings of Kannada film industry with Bhargava directing Vishnu in 23 films. His first film with Bhargava was Asadhya Aliya which was successful. To name a few are Guru Shishyaru, Jeevana Chakra, Karunamayi, Jana Nayaka, Hrudaya Geethe, Karna, Mathe Haditu Kogile, Onde Guri, Krishna Nee Begane Baro, Shivashankar, Bangarada Kalasa.

Suhasini

Vishnuvardan's pair with actress Suhasini Maniratnam was one of the most lovable pairs in Karnataka.

Ramesh Bhat

Bhat has acted in more than 75 films with Vishnuvardhan.

== As Writer ==
- He was one of the co-screenplay writer for his 1991 movie Lion Jagapathi Rao. The movie earned him Karnataka State Film Award for Best Actor.
- The 1997 Kannada movie Ganesha I Love You was based on a story by Vishnuvardhan which director Phani Ramachandra improvised by borrowing core plot elements from the novel Rendu Rella Aaru by Malladi Venkata Krishna Murthy.

== As singer ==
He started singing in movies occasionally and later went on to sing devotional songs for albums. The first song he sang was in the movie Nagarahole and he has recorded some duet songs with the notable legendary singers S. Janaki, Bangalore Latha, Vani Jairam and P. Susheela. The first devotional album sung by him was on Lord Ayappa and the title of the album was Jyothiroopa Ayappa. His other albums were "Thayi Bhanashankari" (on goddess Banashankari) and Vishwapremi Ayappa. He also sang devotional songs on Dharmastala's Lord Manjunathaswamy, Malemadeshwara and Ranachandi Chamundi.

Some of his renderings are:

Song	Movie	Co-singer	Lyrics	Music
"Ee Notake Mai Maatake"	Nagarahole	Bharathi Vishnuvardhan	Chi. Udayashankar	Sathyam
"Madilalli Maguvaagi Naanu"	Kiladi Kittu	P. Susheela	R. N. Jayagopal	Mohan Kumar
"Shashiya Kandu Moda Helithu"	Siritanakke Savaal		Kunigal Nagabhushan	Vijaya Bhaskar
"Aasegala Thottilidu"	Hanthakana Sanchu	Vani Jairam, Kasthuri Shankar	R. N. Jayagopal	Vijaya Bhaskar
"Naguvude Swarga"	Naga Kala Bhairava	S. Janaki	Chi. Udayashankar	M. Ranga Rao
"Hegiddaroo Neene Chenna"	Sahasa Simha	Renuka	Chi. Udayashankar	Sathyam
"Thutthu Anna Thinnoke"	Jimmy Gallu		Chi. Udayashankar	Vijaya Bhaskar
"Hennu Kannina Sanchalli"	Kallu Veene Nudiyithu	Vani Jairam	R. N. Jayagopal	M. Ranga Rao
"Olavina Jodi"	Kallu Veene Nudiyithu	Vani Jairam	Vijaya Narasimha	M. Ranga Rao
"Eke Eke Karanava Heluveya"	Matthe Vasantha	Vani Jairam	Chi. Udayashankar	
"Beda Annoru Unte"	Sididedda Sahodara	S. Janaki	Chi. Udayashankar	Sathyam
"Vayyari Nee Heege"	Gandugali Rama	Vani Jairam	Chi. Udayashankar	Sathyam
"Savi Mathanu Aadeya"	Chinnadantha Maga	S. Janaki	Chi. Udayashankar	Sathyam
"Kannalli Nee Bandu"	Simha Gharjane	S. Janaki	Chi. Udayashankar	Sathyam
"Cheluvina Chenniga"	Rudranaga	Bangalore Latha	R. N. Jayagopal	M. Ranga Rao
"Mutthe Maniye"	Khaidi	S. Janaki	Chi. Udayashankar	Chakravarthy
"Anuraga Geetheyalli"	Benki Birugali	Solo	Chi. Udayashankar	M. Ranga Rao
"Nammoora Beedhiyalli"	Benki Birugali	Solo	Doddarangegowda	M. Ranga Rao
"Kandadda Kandaange"	Huli Hejje		Doddarangegowda	Vijaya Bhaskar
"Kande Nanna Olavina Hudugiya"	Maha Purusha		R. N. Jayagopal	Sathyam
"Anuragaveno Aanandaveno"	Nammoora Raja	K. S. Chithra	Shyamasundar Kulkarni	Rajan Nagendra
"Kila Kila Nagutha Baaro"	Shivashankar	Manjula Gururaj, Chandrika Gururaj	Chi. Udayashankar	Rajan Nagendra
"Megha Maleyali"	Hosa Love Story		Rajkishore	
"Kannadave Nammamma"	Mojugara Sogasugara		Hamsalekha	Hamsalekha
"Onde Ondu Question"	Surya Vamsha	Baby Rithisha	Doddarangegowda	V. Manohar
"Abhimanigale Nanna Prana"	Vishnu Sena		K. Kalyan	Deva

== Death ==
On 30 December 2009, Vishnuvardhan died of a heart attack at King's Court Hotel in Mysore. He was survived by his wife, Bharathi, and their two daughters, Keerthi and Chandana. He was cremated with full state honours at Abhiman studio in Bengaluru.

== Legacy, awards and honours ==
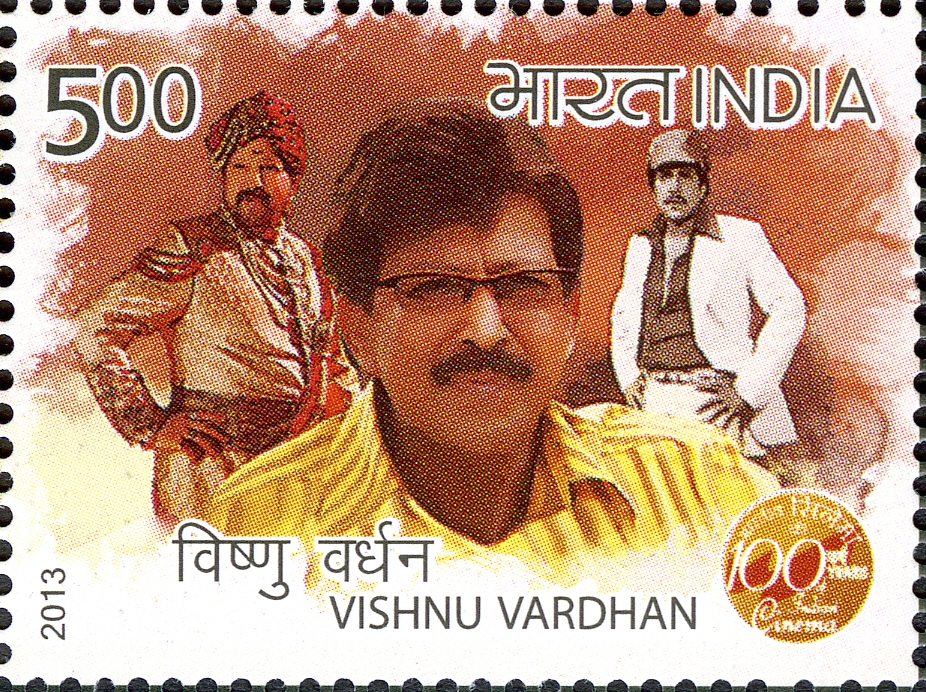
A 2013 stamp of India depicting Vishnuvardhan

=== Filmfare Award South ===
Filmfare Best Actor - Kannada – 4 times

- Suprabhatha (1988)
- Haalunda Tavaru (1994)
- Yajamana (2000)
- Apthamitra (2004)

Filmfare Special Jury Award – 2 times

- Naagarahaavu (1973)
- Bandhana (1984)
- Filmfare Lifetime Achievement Award – South – 2002

Cinema Express Awards:

- Cinema Express Award for the Best Actor – Suprabhatha (1988)
- Cinema Express Award for the Best Actor – Rayaru Bandaru Mavana Manege (1993)
- Cinema Express Award for the Best Actor – Yajamana (2000)

Other awards

- Kaladevi Award (Chennai)
- Indira Prathishtan National Award
- Tarangini Barkley

=== Karnataka State Film Awards ===
Year	Award	Film	Role
1972-73	Best Actor	Naagarahaavu	Ramachari
1977-78	Best Actor	Hombisilu	Dr.Nataraj
1984-85	Best Actor	Bandhana	Dr.Harish
1990-91	Best Actor	Lion Jagapathi Rao	Jagapathi Rao, Kumar (Dual roles)
1997-98	Best Actor	Laali	Krishna
1998-99	Best Actor	Veerappa Nayaka	Veerappa Nayaka
2007-08	Dr. Rajkumar Lifetime Achievement Award	For his Lifetime Contribution	
2009-10	Best Actor	Aaptha Rakshaka	Dr.Vijay

Vishnuvardhan

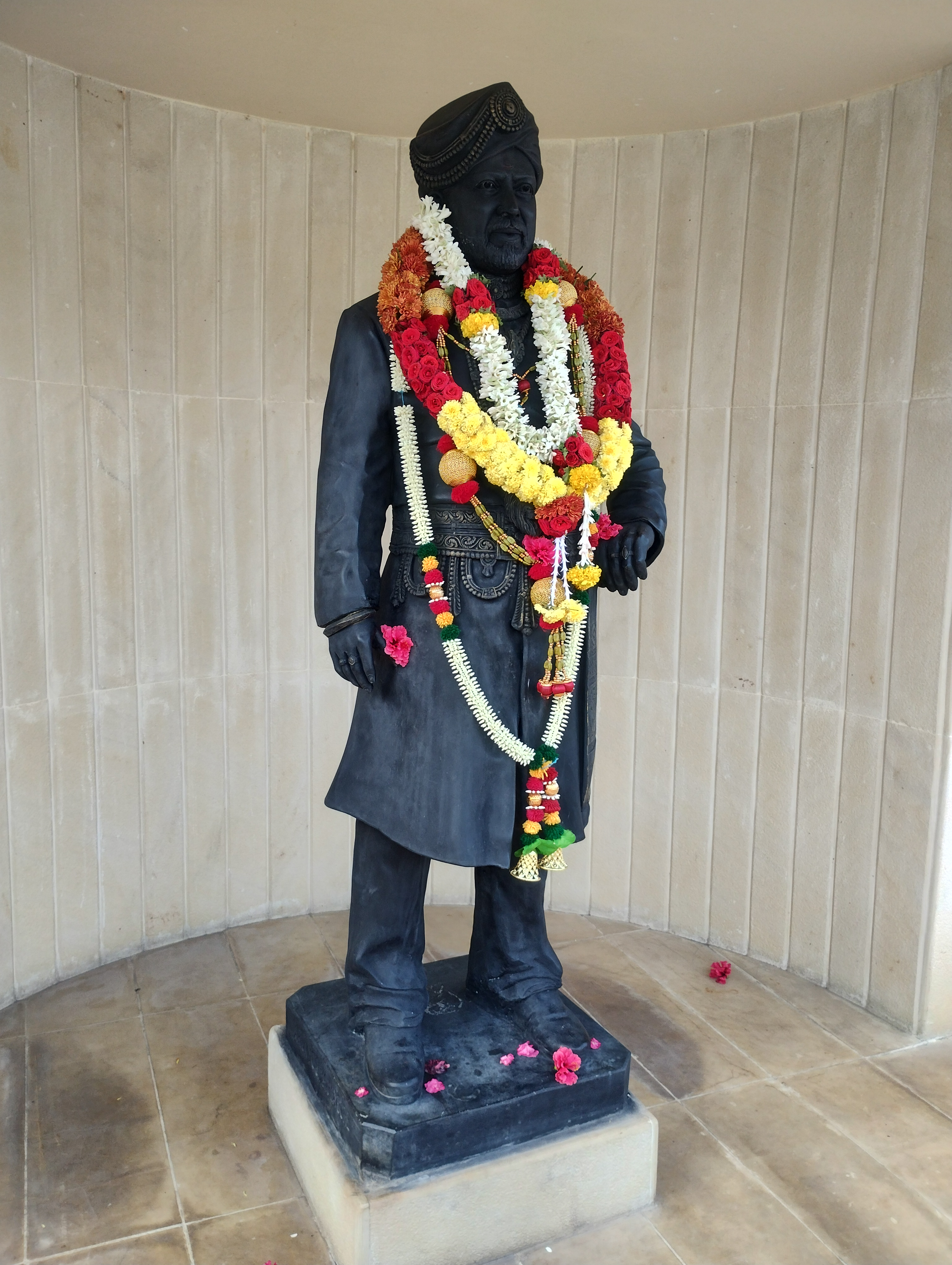
The actor's statue in Dr. Vishnuvardhan Memorial, Mysore (2025)

- Vishnuvardhan received Karnataka Rajyothsava Prashasthi in 1990.
- He bagged Kerala Cultural & Art Award
- As an acknowledgment to his service to Indian cinema, the state government named its annual lifetime achievement award to long-serving film personalities after Vishnuvardhan, renaming it as the Karnataka State Dr. Vishnuvardhan Award.
- He has appeared on postage stamps issued by the Government of India posthumously.
- Vishnuvardhan was given the Filmfare Lifetime Achievement Award – South in 2002 for his contribution to the Kannada film industry.
- The State Government has named roads and parks in the capital city Bangalore after him. A park in Jayanagar, Bengaluru has also been named as Dr. Vishnuvardhan Park.
- The government of Karnataka decided to build a film city in the name of Dr. Vishnuvardhan. It will be similar to the model of Ramoji Film City in Hyderabad.
- The Karnataka Assembly showed respect to the star by praying for a minute for his soul to rest in peace. After that, the election of the Speaker was held under chaotic circumstances as the Opposition parties wanted the elections to be postponed due to this shocking and unexpected incident.
- There are statues erected in his honour, especially in Bangalore. A 7-foot-high (2.1 m) statue in Gowri Palya on 1 March 2012, Laggere on 4 March 2012, Kengeri on 9 October 2011, KP Agrahara in Vijayanagar on 11 March 2012 and in other places of Bengaluru and Karnataka were unveiled.
- Vishnuvardhan was cremated at the Abhimaan Studios, in the outskirts of Bangalore on 30 December 2009 with full state honours. Almost all the leading politicians and actors were present there.
- A 14.3 km-long stretch of road between the Banashankari Temple and Kengeri in Bangalore has been named after the superstar. It is the longest road in Asia to be named after a celebrity.
- Vishnuvardhan's fans, for whom he is a demi-god, have built a temple for him naming it Dr. Vishnuvardhan Mandir.
- He was called The Phoenix of Indian Cinema.
- Karnataka Ratna in 2025 by Karnataka State Government.

== Media gallery ==
Dr. Vishnuvardhan Memorial, Mysore (2025)
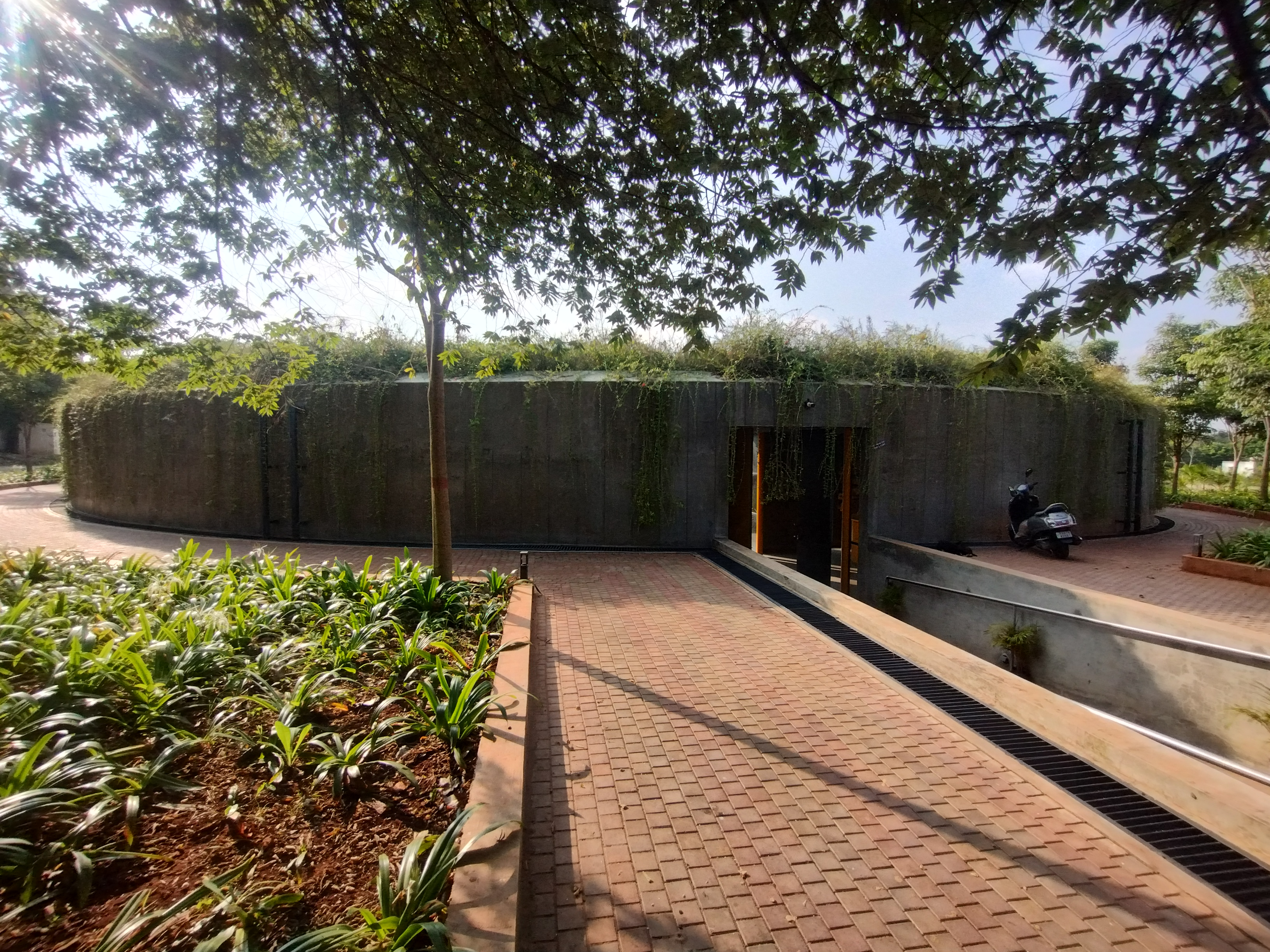

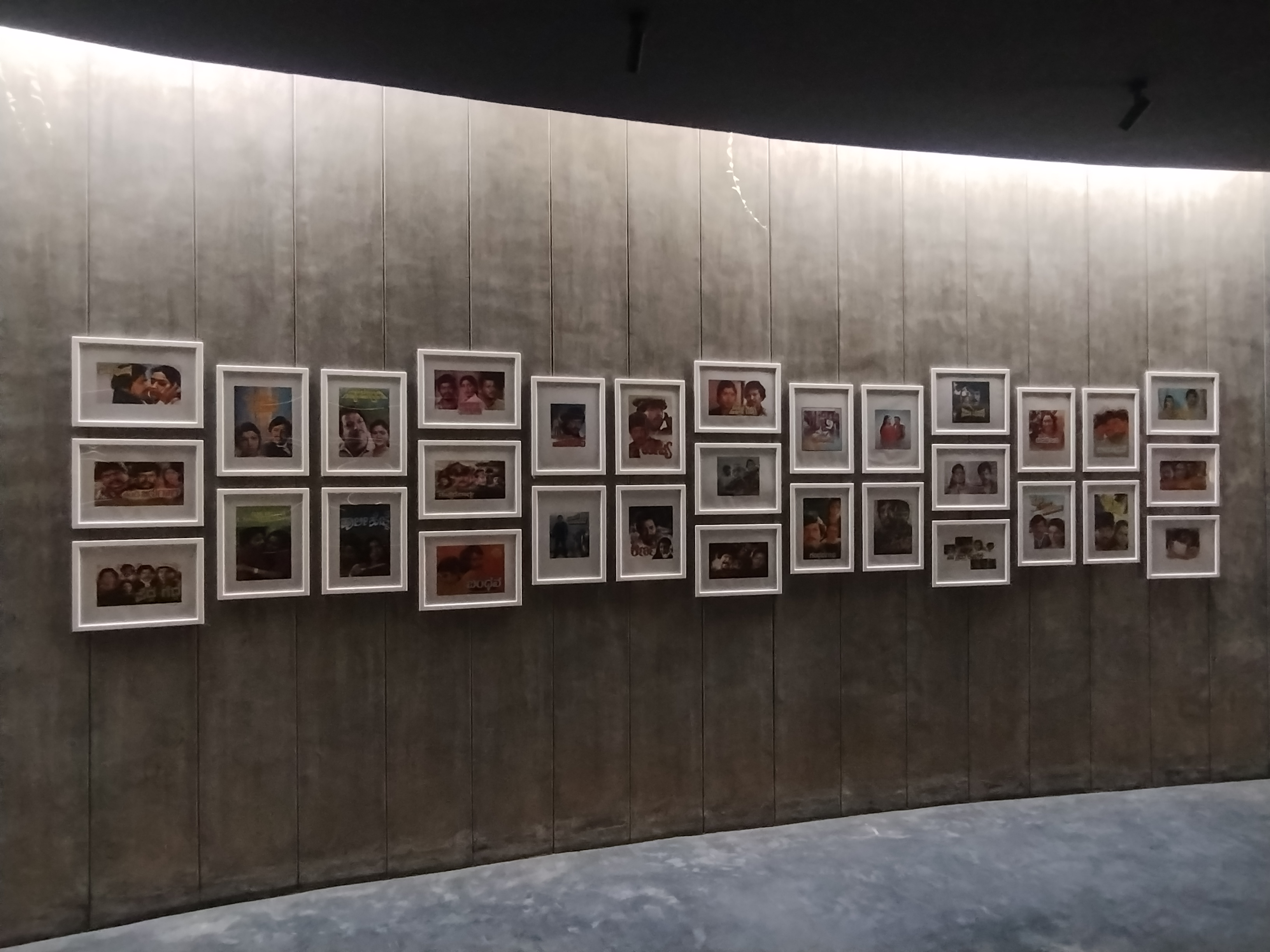

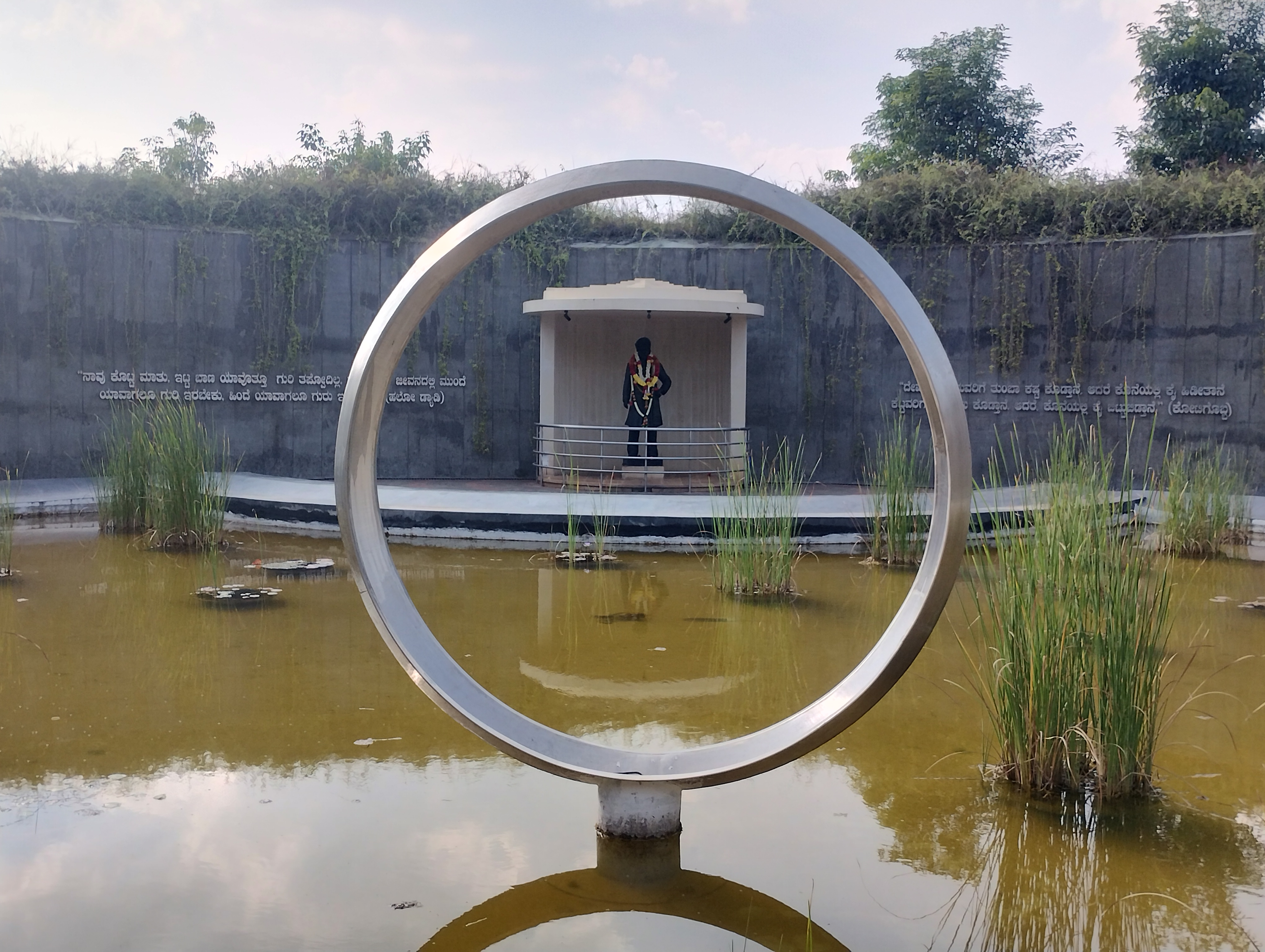

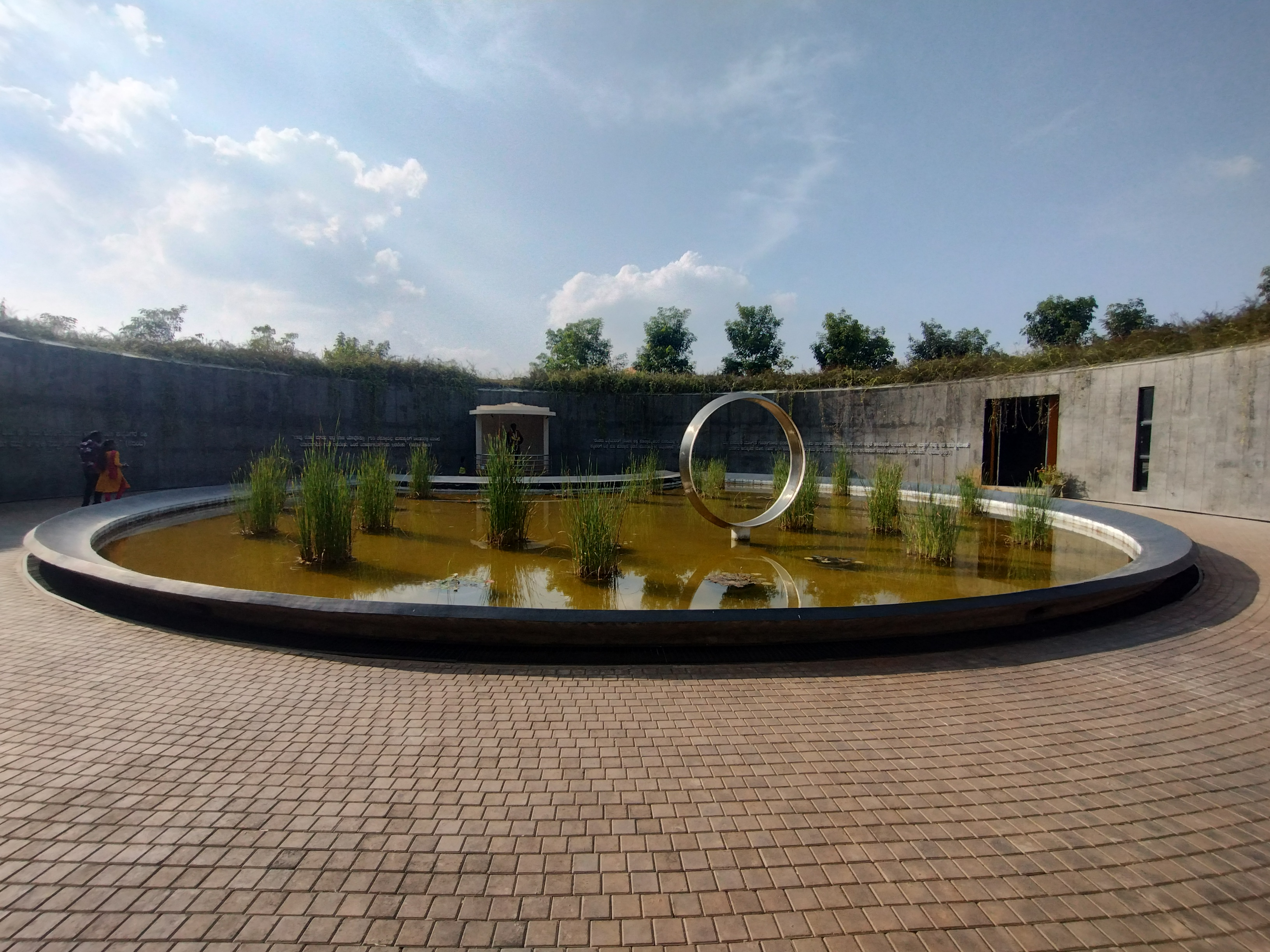

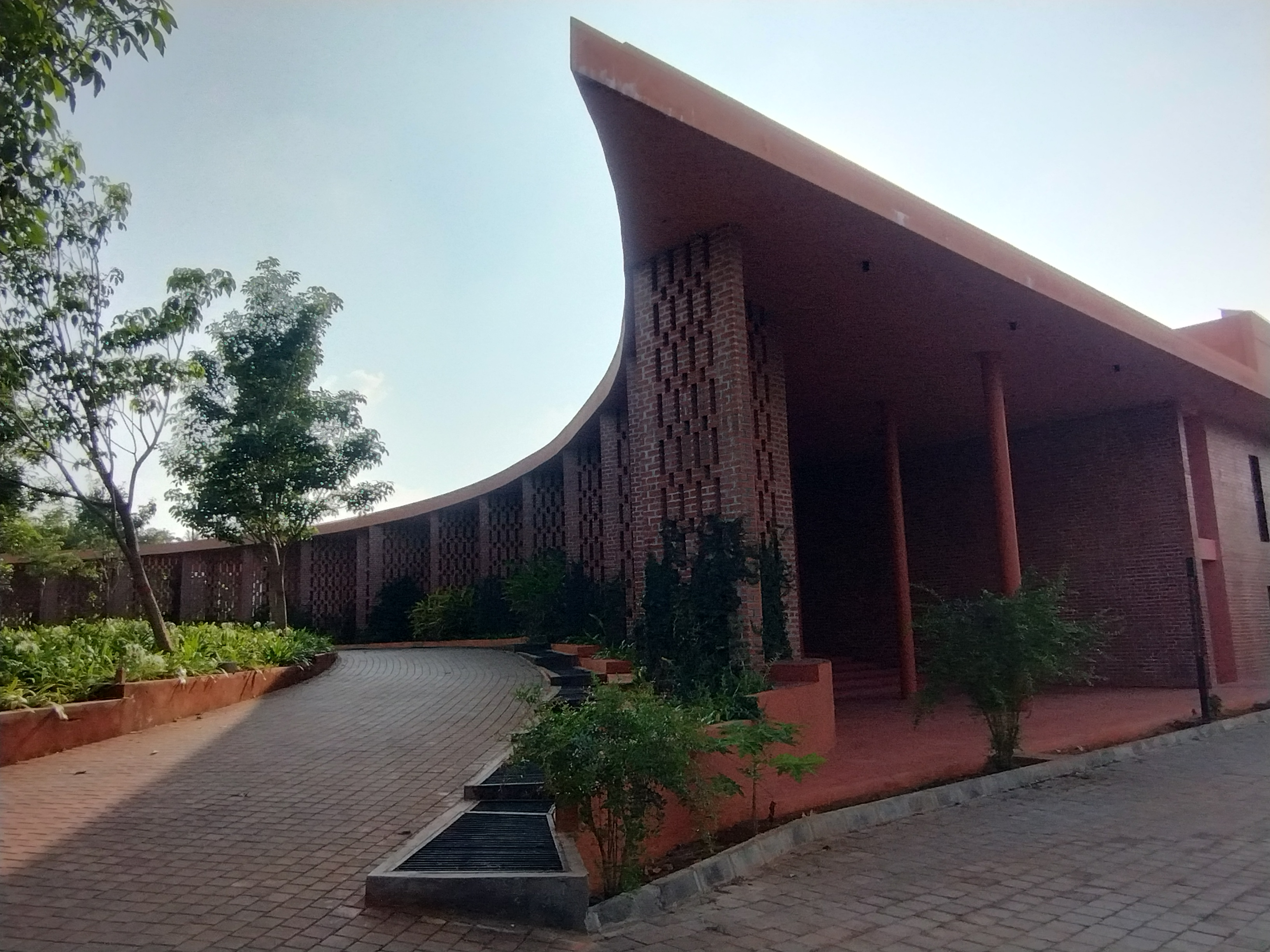
