= R. Chittibabu =

Indian film cinematographer (1927–1999)

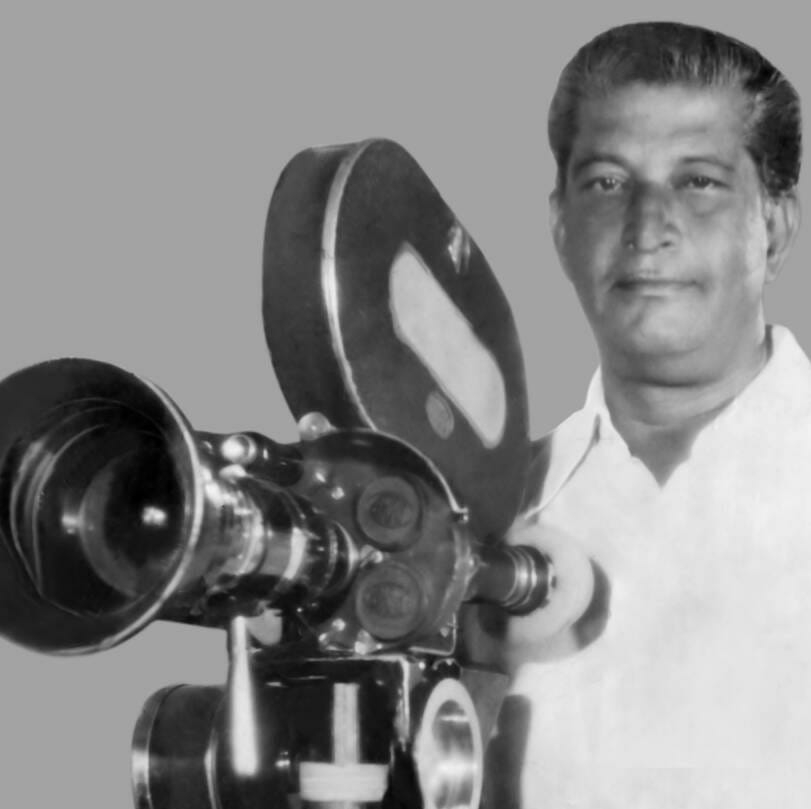
- Born: 25 May 1927
- Died: 28 January 1999 (aged 71)
- Occupation: Cinematographer
- Spouse: Lalitha C

R. Chittibabu (25 May 1927 – 28 January 1999) was an Indian cinematographer, who worked primarily in Kannada cinema, Karnataka. He became a cinematographer in the early 1950s, working on about hundred films in the Film industry and most of which starred Dr. Rajkumar in the lead role and were highly successful in the Box-Office. R. Chittibabu is famously known for the movies Kasturi Nivasa(1971), Naagarahaavu(1972), Naa Ninna Mareyalare(1976), Bayalu Daari(1976), Huliya Haalina Mevu(1979), Chakravyuha (1983 film).

== Personal life ==
=== Early life ===
R. Chittibabu was born in Chidambaram, in the state of Tamil Nadu in India on 25 May 1927 to Shivanandam and Rajamma.

=== Married life ===
R. Chittibabu married Lalitha. They had seven children.

== Film career ==
In his early career, he worked as Camera Assistant in Revathi Studio, Chennai. Impressed by his interest towards Cinematography, B. S. Ranga offered R. Chittibabu to work as Assistant Cameraman in the film Devadasu (1953 film).

Worked as an Operative Cameraman for Chella Pillai in 1955.

R. Chittibabu debuted as a cinematographer in the 1966 Kannada film Love in Bangalore, Followed by a successful journey of 72 more Kannada films, 13 Tamil films, 5 Telugu films and 4 Hindi Films. He's famously known for the movies Kasturi Nivasa (1971), Naagarahaavu (1972), Naa Ninna Mareyalare (1976), Bayalu Daari (1976), Huliya Haalina Mevu (1979), Chakravyuha and Teri Meherbaniyan (1985).

"Baare Baare" Song from the 1972 film Naagarahaavu made history as the first slow-motion song of Indian cinema. Cinematographer R. Chittibabu along with film director Puttanna Kanagal experimented the slow-motion technique for this song, which turned out to be a big hit.

== Awards ==
- Lavanya Film Award for Excellent Cinematography for Naa Ninna Mareyalare (1976)
- Memento by Govt. of Karnataka for serving Kannada cinema (1984)
- Madras Film-Fans Award
- Lions club Shield

== Filmography ==
As Cinematographer (Note: https://kannadamoviesinfo.wordpress.com/r-chittibabu-profile/. Archived from the Original on 16 July 2016 Retrieved 25 May 2021.) (Note: R. chittibabu movies . Achieved from the Original on 6 January 2015. Retrieved on 25 May 2021.) (Note: ‘Baare Baare Chandada Cheluvina Taare’ from ‘Naagarahaavu’ was the first slow-motion song of Indian cinema. Times of India Original)

=== Kannada films ===
73 Film Titles

Year	Film	Director
1966	Love in Bangalore	Kalyan Kumar
1966	Endu Ninnavane	Kalyan Kumar
1967	Kallu Sakkare	Kalyan Kumar
1967	Chakra Theertha	Peketi Sivaram
1968	Jedara Bale	Dorai–Bhagavan
1968	Goa Dalli CID 999	Dorai–Bhagavan
1968	Namma Ooru	C.V Shivashankar
1969	Punarjanma	Peketi Sivaram
1969	Manashanthi	M.S Nayak
1970	Nadina Bhagya	R. Nagendra Rao
1970	Baalu Belagithu	S. Siddalingaiah
1970	Paropakari	Y. R. Swamy
1971	Kasturi Nivasa	Dorai–Bhagavan
1971	Thayi Devaru	S. Siddalingaiah
1971	Pratidwani	Dorai–Bhagavan
1971	Sri Krishna Rukmini Satyabhama	K. S. L. Swamy
1972	Sipayi Ramu	Y. R. Swamy
1972	Nanda Gokula	Y. R. Swamy
1972	Naagarahaavu	Puttanna Kanagal
1974	Sampathige Savaal	A. V. Seshagiri Rao
1974	Eradu Kanasu (1974 film)	Dorai–Bhagavan
1974	Sri Srinivasa Kalyana	B. Vijaya Reddy
1975	Devara Gudi	R.Ramamurthy
1975	Kalla Kulla	K. S. R. Das
1975	Hennu Samsarada Kannu	A.V. Seshagiri Rao
1975	Devara Kannu	Y. R. Swamy
1975	Viplava Vanithe	Chakraborty
1976	Devaru Kotta Vara	R Ramamurthy
1976	Baduku Bangaravayithu	A.V. Seshagiri Rao
1976	Bayalu Daari	Dorai–Bhagavan
1976	Raja Nanna Raja	A. V. Sheshagiri Rao
1976	Naa Ninna Mareyalare	B. Vijaya Reddy
1977	Bayasade Banda Bhagya	Ramamurthy
1977	Pavana Ganga	Y. R. Swamy
1977	Giri Kanye	Dorai–Bhagavan
1977	Sanaadi Appanna	B. Vijaya Reddy
1978	Kudure Mukha	Y. R. Swamy
1979	Asadhya Aliya	H. R. Bhargava
1979	Huliya Haalina Mevu	B. Vijaya Reddy
1979	Chandanada Gombe	Dorai–Bhagavan
1979	Nanobba Kalla	Dorai–Bhagavan
1980	Rama Lakshmana	M P Shankar, K S L Swamy (Ravi)
1980	Moogana Sedu	B. A. Subba Rao
1980	Biligiriya Banadalli	S. Siddalingaiah
1980	Vasantha Geetha	Dorai–Bhagavan
1981	Shri Raghavendra Vaibhavem	Babu Krishnamurthy
1981	Thayiya Madilalli	B. A. Subba Rao
1981	Anupama (1981 film)	Renuka Sharma
1981	Nari Swargakke Dari	S. Siddalingaiah
1981	Koodi Balidare Swarga Sukha	S. Siddalingaiah
1981	Shreeman	Geethapriya
1982	Prema Matsara	C.V. Rajendran
1982	Parajitha	S. Siddalingaiah
1982	Tony (1982 film)	H. R. Bhargava
1982	Khadeema Kallaru	B. Vijaya Reddy
1982	Benkiya Bale	Dorai–Bhagavan
1982	Chakravyuha (1983 film)	V. Somashekhar
1983	Ibbani Karagithu	K. V. Jayaram
1984	Gajendra (1984 film)	V. Somashekhar
1984	Thaliya Bhagya	A.L Vijay
1984	Premave Balina Belaku	A.V. Seshagiri Rao
1984	Thayi Nadu	Vijay
1984	Olavu Moodidaga	B. Mallesh
1984	Premigala Saval	V. Somashekhar
1985	Bidugadeya Bedi	Dorai–Bhagavan
1985	Thayi Kanasu	Vijay
1985	Kiladi Aliya	Vijay
1985	Sedina Hakki	Dorai–Bhagavan
1985	Kumkuma Thanda Sowbhagya	A. V. Sheshagiri Rao
1986	Hennina Koogu	Dorai–Bhagavan
1986	Thavaru Mane	Vijay
1987	Thaliya Aane	D Rajendra Babu
1988	Shiva Mecchida Kannappa	Vijay

=== Tamil films ===
11 Film Titles

Year	Film	Director
1962	Naagamalai Azhagi	
1962	Pattinathar (1962 film)	K. Somu
1962	Kannadi Maaligai	Sami-Mahesh
1969	Chella Penn	K. Krishnamurthy
1970	Kannan Varuvaan	I.N. Moorthy
1971	Then Kinnam	K. Krishnamoorthy
1971	Pattondru Ketten	
1972	Kadhalikka Vanga	I. N. Murthy
1972	Hello Partner	K. Krishnamoorthy
1974	Kula Gowravam	Peketi Sivaram
1974	Shanmugapriya	K. Krishnamoorthy

=== Telugu films ===
4 Film Titles

Year	Film	Director
1968	Punarjanma	Sivaram Peketi
1969	Bhale Abbayilu	Sivaram Peketi
1972	Maa Inti Kodalu	
1982	Bandhalu Anubandhalu	H. R. Bhargava

=== Hindi films ===
4 Film Titles

Year	Film	Director
1985	Teri Meherbaniyan	Vijay Reddy
1986	Pyar Kiya Hai Pyar Karenge	Vijay Reddy
1987	Jawab Hum Denge	Vijay Reddy
1989	Paap Ka Ant	Vijay Reddy
