= List of Kannada films of 1975 =

== Top-grossing films ==
| Rank | Title | Collection | Ref. |
|---|---|---|---|
| 1. | Mayura | ₹3.5 crore (₹161.3 crore in 2025) | |
| 2. | Daari Thappida Maga | ₹3 crore (₹138.25 crore in 2025) | |
| 3. | Thrimurthy | ₹2.5 crore (₹115 crore in 2025) | |

== Released films ==
The following is a list of films produced in the Kannada film industry in India in 1975, presented in alphabetical order.

| Title | Director | Cast | Music |
|---|---|---|---|
| Aasha Soudha | K. B. Srinivasan | Udaya Kumar, Rajesh, Dwarakish, Kalpana, Udaya Chandrika | P. L. Sriramulu |
| Aashirvada | Kunigal Nagabhushan | Udaya Kumar, Rajesh, Rajashree, Vijayakala | Upendra Kumar |
| Beluvalada Madilalli | Geethapriya | Rajesh, Kalpana, Balakrishna, Chandrashekhar | Rajan–Nagendra |
| Bhagya Jyothi | K. S. L. Swamy | Vishnuvardhan, Bharathi, K. S. Ashwath, Shubha Radha, Shivaram | Vijaya Bhaskar |
| Bili Hendthi | Puttanna Kanagal | Aarathi, Margaret Thomson, Anil Kumar, Leelavathi, Lokanath, Uma Shivakumar | Vijaya Bhaskar |
| Chomana Dudi | B. V. Karanth | M. V. Vasudeva Rao, Padma Kumta, Jayarajan, Shankar Bhat | B. V. Karanth |
| Daari Tappida Maga | Peketi Sivaram | Rajkumar, Aarathi, Kalpana, Jayamala | G. K. Venkatesh |
| Devara Gudi | R. Ramamurthy | Vishnuvardhan, Manjula, Bharathi, Shivaram | Rajan–Nagendra |
| Devara Kannu | Y. R. Swamy | Lokesh, Aarathi, Ambareesh, Ananth Nag | T. G. Lingappa |
| Hamsageethe | G. V. Iyer | Ananth Nag, B. V. Karanth, Prema Karanth | M. Balamuralikrishna |
| Hennu Samsarada Kannu | A. V. Seshagiri Rao | Srinath, Manjula, Sridevi, Leelavathi, K. S. Ashwath, Manorama, Shivaram | Vijaya Bhaskar |
| Jagruthi | C. V. Sridhar | Udaya Kumar, Shylashri, Gangadhar, Balakrishna, Vijayakala | P. Vajrappa |
| Kalla Kulla | K. S. R. Das | Vishnuvardhan, Dwarakish, Bhavani, Leelavathi | Rajan–Nagendra |
| Kankana | MBS Prasad | A. Revathi, Suresh Heblikar, Divya Adhikari, Girija, Bharathi | Hamzu Imam |
| Kasthuri Vijaya | Srikanth | Rajesh, Jayanthi, Shylashri, Chandrashekhar | Vijaya Bhaskar |
| Kaveri | H. N. Reddy | Rajesh, Bharathi Vishnuvardhan, Pandaribai, K. S. Ashwath, Sampath, Balakrishna | M. Ranga Rao |
| Koodi Balona | M. R. Vittal | Vishnuvardhan, Bhavani, Loknath, Dwarakish, Thoogudeepa Srinivas | G. K. Venkatesh |
| Mahadeshwara Pooja Phala | Sangram | Srinath, B. V. Radha, Rajashree, Ramadevi, Balakrishna, Ambareesh, Dwarakish | Satyam |
| Mane Belaku | Y. R. Swamy | Chandrashekhar, Chandrakala, B. V. Radha, K. S. Ashwath, Balakrishna | M. Ranga Rao |
| Manthra Shakthi | Hunsur Krishnamurthy | Udaya Kumar, Bhavani, M. P. Shankar, Kalpana, Shylashri | Rajan Nagendra |
| Mayura | Vijay | Rajkumar, Srinath, Manjula, Vajramuni, Tiger Prabhakar, Balakrishna, K. S. Ashwath, Advani Lakshmi Devi, Jayamalini | G. K. Venkatesh |
| Nagakanye | Rajendra Singh Babu | Vishnuvardhan, Ambareesh, Rajashree, Bhavani, B. V. Radha | Satyam |
| Namma Oora Devaru | N. T. Jayarama Reddy | Rajesh, Udaya Chandrika, Balakrishna, Thoogudeepa Srinivas | Upendra Kumar |
| Nanjunda Nakkaga | Basavaraj Kesthur | Ramgopal, Balakrishna, Vajramuni, Srilalitha, M. N. Lakshmi Devi | Upendra Kumar |
| Ninagagi Naanu | C. V. Sridhar | Srinath, Manjula, Lokesh, Shivaram, Manorama | Vijaya Bhaskar |
| Nireekshe | Kovi Manisekaran | Srinath, Kalpana, Manjula, Shivaram | G. K. Venkatesh |
| Onde Roopa Eradu Guna | A. M. Sameulla | Vishnuvardhan, Chandrashekhar, Ambareesh, Chandrakala, Bhavani | Salil Chowdhury |
| Sarpa Kaavalu | S. N. Singh | Rajesh, Anitha, B. V. Radha, Rajasree | Satyam |
| Shubhamangala | Puttanna Kanagal | Srinath, Aarathi, Ambareesh, Shivaram | Vijaya Bhaskar |
| Thrimurthy | C. V. Rajendran | Rajkumar, Jayamala, Vajramuni, Sampath | G. K. Venkatesh |
| Viplava Vanithe | Chakravarthy | Rajesh, Gangadhar, Balakrishna, Vijaya Lalitha, B. V. Radha | M. Ranga Rao |

== Dr. Rajkumar Movies ==
1. Mayura
2. Daari Tappida Maga
3. Thrimurthy

== See also ==
- Kannada films of 1974
- Kannada films of 1976
