= List of Kannada films of 1980 =

== Top-grossing films ==
Rank	Title	Collection	Ref.
1.	Auto Raja	₹3 crore (₹73.66 crore in 2025)	
2.	Vasantha Geetha	₹2.5 crore (₹61.38 crore in 2025)	
3.	Bangarada Jinke	₹2 crore (₹50 crore in 2025)	
4.	Narada Vijaya	₹1.5 crore (₹36.83 crore in 2025)	
5.	Maria My Darling	₹1 crore (₹25 crore in 2025)	

== List ==
The following is a list of films produced in the Kannada film industry in India in 1980, presented in alphabetical order.

Title	Director	Cast	Music director	Producer	Cinematographer
Aarada Gaaya	V. Somashekhar	Shankar Nag, Gayathri, Vajramuni, Dinesh, Rajashankar, Jai Jagadish, Sowcar Janaki	Satyam	Gowramma Somasekhar	P. S. Prakash
Akhanda Bramhacharigalu	Vishukumar	Vishukumar, Vamanaraj, Damayanthi	Vijaya Bhaskar	B. Damodar	Nimoy Ghosh
Anurakthe	Maruthi Shivaram	Aarathi, Goutham, Rani Padmini, Maanu, B. V. Radha	Ashwath - Vaidi	Annadanappa Shivaram	K. Mallik
Auto Raja	Vijay	Shankar Nag, Gayathri, Dwarakish	Rajan–Nagendra	C. Jayaram	S. V. Srikanth
Bangarada Jinke	T. S. Nagabharana	Vishnuvardhan, Bharathi, Aarathi, Leelavathi, Sundar Raj, Lokanath	Vijaya Bhaskar	B. S. Somasundar	S. Ramachandra
Bhakta Siriyala	Hunsur Krishnamurthy	Lokesh, Aarathi, K. S. Ashwath, Srinivasa Murthy	T. G. Lingappa	Chandulal Jain	R. Madhusudhan
Biligiriya Banadalli	Siddalingaiah	Vishnuvardhan, Supriya, M. P. Shankar, Srinivasa Murthy, Jai Jagadish	Rajan–Nagendra	Smt. Jayadevi	R. Chittibabu
Chitrakoota	Gowri Sundar	Udayakumar, Kalyan Kumar, Bharathi, Balakrishna	Mysore Ananthaswamy	Sumukha Pictures	Vipin Mohan, Sundarnath Suvarna, Gowrisundar
Dhairya Lakshmi	Gopu	Ananth Nag, Lakshmi, Nagesh, Ambareesh, K. S. Ashwath	G. K. Venkatesh	K. S. Ashok	M. G. Benjamin
Doddamane Estate	C. Chandrashekar	Maanu, Pramila Joshai, Lokanath, Srilalitha	Ashwath - Vaidi	Navaras Films	B. C. Gowrishankar
Driver Hanumanthu	K. S. L. Swamy	Shivaram, K. S. Ashwath, Thoogudeepa Srinivas, Rajeshwari, Vishnuvardhan, Ambareesh	Vijaya Bhaskar	Rashi Brothers	B. Purushottham
Ellindalo Bandavaru	P. Lankesh	Lokesh, Suresh Heblikar, Vimala Naidu	Vijaya Bhaskar	Navashakthi	S. R. Bhat
Guru Sarvabhowma Sri Raghavendra Karune	Hunsur Krishnamurthy	Rajesh, Jamuna, B. Saroja Devi, Gangadhar	M. Ranga Rao	Lakshmi Prakash Combines	B. N. Haridas
Haddina Kannu	A. V. Seshagiri Rao	Shankar Nag, Lokesh, Srinath, Manjula	Satyam	P. Krishnaraj	V. K. Kannan
Hanthakana Sanchu	B. Kishan	Vishnuvardhan, Aarathi, Jayamala	Vijaya Bhaskar	K. S. Jagannath	N. G. Rao
Hrudaya Deepa	C. S. Subbarayan	Sukumar, Ramgopal, Roopa Chakravarthy	Upendra Kumar	C. S. Subbarayan	M. Venkatesh
Hunnimeya Rathriyalli	Rajashekar	Lokesh, Ashok, Roopa Chakravarthy	Gangai Amaren	Sri Devipriya Creations	T. V. Balu; Lokayya
Irulu Hagalu	K. V. Rajmohan	Hemachandra, Haridas Chowta, Rohini, Vishwanath	Vijay Kumar	Flame Cine Enterprises	S. D. Keerthi
Janma Janmada Anubandha	Shankar Nag	Shankar Nag, Ananth Nag, Jayamala, Jayanthi, Manjula	Ilaiyaraaja	N. Bhaktavatsalam	B. C. Gowrishankar
Jari Bidda Jana	Y. R. Swamy	Lokesh, Ashok, Jayanthi, Srinivasa Murthy	T. G. Lingappa	Thirupathi Jain Films	R. Madhusudhan
Kaalinga	V. Somashekhar	Vishnuvardhan, Rati Agnihotri, Udayakumar, Vajramuni	Satyam	Srikanth Nahatha	S. V. Srikanth
Kadige Hodavaru	Vemagal Jagannath	M. V. Vasudeva Rao, Chandrakumar Jain, Sundar Raj, Prema Karanth, Nalina Murthy	Ashwath-Vaidi	Seema Creations	S. R. Bhat
Kappu Kola	K. Nagesh	Ashok, Jayamala, Maanu, Rekha Rao	Vijaya Bhaskar	Kalakunja Movies	N. G. Rao
Kulla Kulli	H. R. Bhargava	Dwarakish, Jayachitra, Tiger Prabhakar, Leelavathi	Rajan–Nagendra	Dwarakish Chitra	D. V. Jayaram
Makkala Sainya	Lakshmi	Vishnuvardhan, Sumithra, Ashok, Shivaram, Baby Indira	M. S. Viswanathan	P. R. Govindraj	N. Balakrishnan
Manjina There	Bangalore Nagesh	Srinath, Manjula, Thoogudeepa Srinivas, Vajramuni	Upendra Kumar	K. R. Narayana Murthy	R. Madhusudhan
Manku Thimma	H. R. Bhargava	Dwarakish, Srinath, Manjula, Padmapriya, Maanu	Rajan–Nagendra	Dwarakish Chitra	D. V. Jayaram
Maria My Darling	Durai	Kamal Haasan, Sripriya, Udaya Kumar, M. P. Shankar, Vajramuni	Shankar–Ganesh	S. Madhu	V. Ranga
Mayeya Musuku	B. Y. Ramdas	Rajesh, Srilalitha, Balakrishna	T. A. Mothi	Kalashree Cine	D. V. Rajaram; Meenakshi Sundaram
Minchina Ota	Shankar Nag	Shankar Nag, Ananth Nag, Priya Tendulkar, Ramesh Bhat, Lokanath	Prabhakar Bhadri	Ananth Nag-Shankar Nag	B. C. Gowrishankar
Mithuna	Mavinakere Ranganathan	Srinath, Manjula, Thoogudeepa Srinivas, Dinesh	Vijaya Bhaskar	Gopal Combines	T. Yallappa
Moogana Sedu	B. Subba Rao	Shankar Nag, Manjula, Udayakumar, Tiger Prabhakar	Satyam	Madhu Art Films	P. Devaraj, R. Chittibabu
Mother	Vishukumar	Nanditha Bose, Kalyan Kumar, Vaman Raj, Rekha Rao	Vijaya Bhaskar	Vikas Enterprises	Nimoy Ghosh
Nadurathri	Rajan	Sundar Krishna Urs, Vanichandra, T. N. Balakrishna, Thoogudeepa Srinivas, Sheela	M. Poornachandra Rao	N Sampath Kumar Adyanthaya	M. Victor Joseph
Nanna Rosha Nooru Varusha	Joe Simon	Vishnuvardhan, Padmapriya, K. S. Ashwath, Nagesh	Satyam	P. Dhoondi	H. C. Raju
Narada Vijaya	Siddalingaiah	Ananth Nag, Padmapriya, K. S. Ashwath, Hema Chowdhary	Ashwath-Vaidi	N. Veeraswamy, Chandulal Jain, Siddalingaiah	R. Madhusudan
Nyaya Neethi Dharma	A. T. Raghu	Ambareesh, Aarathi, Dwarakish, K. S. Ashwath	Upendra Kumar	V. K. Ramesh	Babulnath
Ondu Hennu Aaru Kannu	V. Madhusudhana Rao	Shankar Nag, Ananth Nag, Ambareesh, Jayalakshmi, Vijayalakshmi	S. Rajeswara Rao	C. H. Prakash Rao	S. S. Lal
Pattanakke Banda Pathniyaru	A. V. Seshagiri Rao	Srinath, Lokesh, Manjula, T. N. Balakrishna	M. Ranga Rao	S. D. Ankalagi	Annayya
Point Parimala	V. Somashekhar	Manjula, Srinath, Dwarakish	Rajan–Nagendra	H R Prabhakar Reddy	P. S. Prakash
Prema Anuraga	Veeresh	Ramakrishna, Sarala, Renuka, Gracy	Veeresh	Kumar Productions	B. C. Gowrishankar
Prema Jwala	Geethapriya	Ananth Nag, Shantha Prakash, Asha Devi, Dheerendra Gopal	M. Ranga Rao	Tumkur Chithralaya	Annayya
Rahasya Rathri	M. S. Kumar	Vishnuvardhan, Bharathi, Prakash, Radha Ravi	Shankar–Ganesh	Annayya	Annayya, Mallik, Murugesh
Rama Lakshmana	Ravee - Shankar	Ashok, Manjula, M. P. Shankar	Rajan–Nagendra	M. P. Shankar	R. Chittibabu
Rama Parushurama	Vijay	Vishnuvardhan, Srinath, Manjula, Pandari Bai, Tiger Prabhakar	Rajan–Nagendra	Gowramma	P. Devaraj
Ravichandra	A. V. Seshagiri Rao	Rajkumar, Lakshmi, Sumalatha, Savitri, Vajramuni	Upendra Kumar	Parvathamma Rajkumar	Annayya, Mallik
Rusthum Jodi	K. Vijayan	Shankar Nag, Manjula, Gayathri	G. K. Venkatesh	N. V. Ramaswamy	Ishan Arya
Simha Jodi	Joe Simon	Vishnuvardhan, Manjula, Jai Jagadish, Tiger Prabhakar	Satyam	A. R. Raju	H. G. Raju
Subbi Subbakka Suvvalaali	N. S. Dhananjaya	Amrish Puri, Ambareesh, Srilalitha, Jai Jagadish, Shanthala	Vijaya Bhaskar	Ramya Films	C S Ravibabu
Swamijee	Basavaraj Kesthur	Sundar Krishna Urs, Srilalitha, Balakrishna	K. P. Sukhadev	Basavaraj Kesthur	K. A. Jyothi
Usha Swayamvara	C. V. Rajendran	Manjula, Srinath, Dwarakish	G. K. Venkatesh	Bhoomi Chithra	V. Gajendra Mani
Vajrada Jalapatha	B. Giribabu	Ambareesh, Jayanthi, Udayakumar	Ramesh Naidu	J G Films	K. Janakiram
Varadakshine	M. R. Vittal	Ashok, Hema Chowdhary, Pramila Joshai, M. S. Umesh	L. Vaidyanathan	Sri Subramanya Pictures	T. G. Shekar
Vasantha Geetha	Dorai-Bhagavan	Rajkumar, Gayathri, K. S. Ashwath, Master Lohith, Leelavathi	M. Ranga Rao	S. A. Govindaraju	R. Chittibabu

== See also ==
- Kannada films of 1981
- Kannada films of 1979
