= Biligiriya Banadalli =

- VCD cover
- Directed by: Siddalingaiah
- Written by: Chi. Udaya Shankar (dialogues)
- Screenplay by: M. D. Sundar
- Story by: Tha Pu Venkataram (Based on Novel)
- Produced by: Smt Jayadevi
- Starring: Vishnuvardhan; M. P. Shankar; Srinivasa Murthy; T. N. Balakrishna
- Cinematography: R. Chittibabu
- Edited by: P. Bhakthavathsalam
- Music by: Rajan–Nagendra
- Production company: Jayadevi Films
- Distributed by: Jayadevi Films
- Release date: 18 July 1980
- Running time: 152 min
- Country: India
- Language: Kannada

Biligiriya Banadalli is a 1980 Indian Kannada film, directed by Siddalingaiah and produced by Smt Jayadevi. The film stars Vishnuvardhan, M. P. Shankar, Srinivasa Murthy and T. N. Balakrishna. The film has musical score by Rajan–Nagendra.

== Cast ==
- Vishnuvardhan
- M. P. Shankar
- Srinivasa Murthy
- T. N. Balakrishna
- C. H. Lokanath
- Dinesh
- Jai Jagadish
- Shakti Prasad
- Rajanand
- Master S. D. Suresh
- Master S. D. Murali
- Master Jayasimha
- Baby Rajani
- Kanchana
- Indira
- Surekha
- Geetha

== Production ==
The song "Muddurangaiah" was shot at Jog Falls for one and a half month.

== Soundtrack ==
Soundtrack was composed by Rajan-Nagendra.

- Biligirya - S. Janaki
- Thareyu Banige - S. P. Balasubrahmanyam, S. Janaki
- Happy Birthday - S. P. Balasubrahmanyam
- Huttu Saavu - S. P. Balasubrahmanyam
