= Nari Munidare Mari =

- Directed by: Geethapriya
- Written by: Geethapriya
- Screenplay by: M. P. Shankar
- Story by: M. P. Shankar
- Produced by: M. P. Shankar
- Starring: Kalpana; Udaykumar; Narasimharaju; B. Jaya
- Cinematography: V. Manohar
- Edited by: Bal G. Yadav
- Music by: Rajan–Nagendra
- Production company: Bharani Chithra
- Distributed by: Bharani Chithra
- Release date: 6 January 1972
- Running time: 142 min
- Country: India
- Language: Kannada

Nari Munidare Mari is a 1972 Indian Kannada-language film, directed by Geethapriya and produced by M. P. Shankar. The film stars Kalpana, Udaykumar, Narasimharaju and B. Jaya. The musical score was composed by Rajan–Nagendra.

== Cast ==
- Kalpana as Hema
- Srinath as Hema's husband (cameo)
- Udaykumar
- Narasimharaju
- B. Jaya as Malli
- Indrani
- Baby Shyam
- M. P. Shankar
- Rajanand
- Prabhakar as Member of bandits gang
- Zaviar
- Mylara Shetty
- D. Pani
- M. J. Hosur
- Cheluvaraj
- Azeej
- H. R. Krishna
- Malur Sonnappa
- M. P. Ramasingh
- M. N. Rudrappa
- Hemalatha
- Sampath (cameo)
- Thoogudeepa Srinivas (cameo)
- M. Jayashree (cameo)
- Jayakumari

== Soundtrack ==
The music was composed by Rajan–Nagendra.

No.	Song	Singers	Lyrics	Length (m:ss)
1	"Gopilola Hey Gopal"	P. Susheela	Geetha Priya	03:25
2	"Maatheya Mamatheya"	P. Susheela	Geetha Priya	03:31
3	"Nammornage"	S. P. Balasubrahmanyam, Saroja, Sadan	Geetha Priya	03:36
4	"Nammurnaag Naaanobne Jaana"	S. P. Balasubrahmanyam, L. R. Eswari	Geetha Priya	03:35
