= List of Kannada films of 1976 =

== Top-grossing films ==
Rank	Title	Collection	Ref.
1.	Naa Ninna Mareyalare	₹3 crore (₹96.4 crore in 2025)	
2.	Premada Kanike	₹2.5 crore (₹80.3 crore in 2025)	
3.	Bayalu Daari	₹1 crore (₹32.3 crore in 2025)	

== List ==
The following is a list of films produced in the Kannada film industry in India in 1976, presented in alphabetical order.

Title	Director	Cast	Music
Aparadhi	Y. R. Swamy	Srinath, Aarathi, Balakrishna	Satyam
Aparoopada Athithigalu	Kashinath	Suresh, Sharada Prasad, Ananda Dharwad, Janaki Chandar, Srinivas	Bagepalli Subramanyam
Apoorva Kanasu	P. Balachandar	Srinath, Bhavani, Dinesh, Dwarakish	Mahesh-Naresh
Baalu Jenu	Kunigal Nagabhushan	Gangadhar, Aarathi, Rajinikanth, Ramgopal, Pandari Bai	G. K. Venkatesh
Badavara Bandhu	Vijay	Rajkumar, Jayamala, K. S. Ashwath, Vajramuni	M. Ranga Rao
Baduku Bangaravayitu	A. V. Sheshagiri Rao	Srinath, Jayanthi, Manjula, Vajramuni	M. Ranga Rao
Bahaddur Gandu	A. V. Sheshagiri Rao	Rajkumar, Aarathi, Jayanthi, Dwarakish, Vajramuni	M. Ranga Rao
Bangarada Gudi	K. S. R. Das	Vishnuvardhan, Manjula, Ambareesh	G. K. Venkatesh
Bayalu Daari	Dorai-Bhagavan	Ananth Nag, Kalpana, K. S. Ashwath	Rajan–Nagendra
Besuge	Geethapriya	Srinath, Manjula, K. S. Ashwath	Vijaya Bhaskar
College Ranga	Puttanna Kanagal	Kalyan Kumar, Leelavathi, Lokanath, Musuri Krishnamurthy	T. G. Lingappa
Devaru Kotta Vara	R. Ramamurthy	Vishnuvardhan, Jayanthi, Gangadhar	M. Ranga Rao
Hosilu Mettida Hennu	V. T. Thyagarajan	Vishnuvardhan, Ambareesh, Aarathi, Leelavathi	T. G. Lingappa
Hudugatada Hudugi	Amrutham	Srinath, Manjula, Dwarakish, Ambareesh, Shivaram	M. Ranga Rao
Idu Namma Desha	A. R. Sabhapathi Devar	Kalpana, B. M. Venkatesh, Leelavathi, Dwarakish	R. Rathna
Kanasu Nanasu	Amrutham	Srinath, Manjula, K. S. Ashwath	M. Ranga Rao
Katha Sangama	Puttanna Kanagal	Rajinikanth, B. Saroja Devi, Aarathi, Kalyan Kumar, Gangadhar, Lokanath, Leelavathi	Vijaya Bhaskar
Makkala Bhagya	K. S. L. Swamy	Vishnuvardhan, Bharathi Vishnuvardhan, Leelavathi, K. S. Ashwath, Dwarakish	Vijaya Bhaskar
Mangalya Bhagya	Vijaya Satyam	Jayanthi, Basanth Kumar Patil, Bhavani	Rajan–Nagendra
Maya Manushya	K. V. S. Kutumba Rao	Rajesh, B. V. Radha, Vadiraj, Dheerendra Gopal	Vijaya Bhaskar
Mugiyada Kathe	Dorai	Rajesh, Sumitra, Pandari Bai, Dinesh	Rajan–Nagendra
Naa Ninna Mareyalare	Vijay	Rajkumar, Lakshmi, Leelavathi, Balakrishna	Rajan–Nagendra
Pallavi	P. Lankesh	Vimala Naidu, T. N. Seetharam, Parvathavani, Bhargavi Narayan	Rajeev Taranath
Parivarthane	Dr. Chitagopi	Lokesh, Vaishali Kasaravalli, Chandrashekhar, Shivaram	Shyamala G. Bhave
Phalitamsha	Puttana Kanagal	Aarathi, Jai Jagadish, Shubha, Lokanath, Vaishali Kasaravalli, Leelavathi	Vijaya Bhaskar
Premada Kanike	V. Somashekhar	Rajkumar, Aarathi, Vajramuni, Jayamala, Rajashankar, Thoogudeepa Srinivas, Balakrishna, Poornima Rajkumar, Master Lohith	Upendra Kumar
Punardattha	C. S. Rao	Lokesh, Aarathi, Nanditha Bose, Thoogudeepa Srinivas	M. Ranga Rao
Raja Nanna Raja	A. V. Seshagiri Rao	Rajkumar, Aarathi, Chandrashekhar, K. S. Ashwath, Thoogudeepa Srinivas	G. K. Venkatesh
Rajanarthakiya Rahasya	B. Harinarayanaiah	Rajesh, Kalpana, Udaya Kumar, P. R. Varalakshmi, Musuri Krishnamurthy	B. Vasantha
Soothrada Bombe	Peketi Sivaram	Srinath, Manjula, Chandrashekhar, Udaya Chandrika	Satyam
Thulasi	K. S. L. Swamy	Kalyan Kumar, Srinath, Lokanath, Shivaram, Jayanthi, Manjula, B. V. Radha	Vijaya Bhaskar
Vijaya Vani	N. Venkatesh	Srinath, Kalpana, Ashok, M. V. Rajamma, Dwarakish	Rajan–Nagendra
Yaru Hithavaru	P. Sathya Murthy	Ramgopal, Venkatarao Thalageri, Jayamala, Vijayakala	Mysore Ananthaswamy

== See also ==
- Kannada films of 1975
- Kannada films of 1977
