= Rama Parushurama =

Rama Parashurama
- Directed by: Vijay
- Written by: Chi. Udaya Shankar (dialogues)
- Screenplay by: M. D. Sundar
- Story by: Pasumani
- Produced by: Smt Gowramma Somashekar; Smt Dhanalakshmi Vijay
- Starring: Vishnuvardhan; Srinath; Manjula; Thoogudeepa Srinivas
- Cinematography: P. Devaraj
- Edited by: P. Bhakthavathsalam
- Music by: Rajan–Nagendra
- Production company: Vijay Shekar Movies
- Distributed by: Vijay Shekar Movies
- Release date: 19 February 1980
- Running time: 140 minutes
- Country: India
- Language: Kannada

Rama Parashurama is a 1980 Indian Kannada-language film, directed by Vijay and produced by Smt Gowramma Somashekar and Smt Dhanalakshmi Vijay. The film stars Vishnuvardhan, Srinath, Manjula and Thoogudeepa Srinivas. The film has musical score by Rajan–Nagendra.

== Cast ==
- Vishnuvardhan
- Srinath
- Manjula
- Thoogudeepa Srinivas
- Dinesh
- Shakti Prasad
- Prasad
- Rajanand
- Ramakrishna
- Comedian Guggu
- Adavani Lakshmidevi
- Lakshmishree
- Lalithamma
- Shanthamma
- Sripramila
- Roopashree
- Master Rajesh
- Master Arun
- Baby Rekha
- Mallesh
- Bhatti Mahadev
- Shivaprakash
- Sharapanjara Iyengar
- Thipatur Siddaramaiah
- Police Mahadev
- Kunigal Ramanath
- Tiger Prabhakar

== Soundtrack ==
The music was composed by Rajan–Nagendra.

No.	Song	Singers	Lyrics	Length (m:ss)
1	"Hombisilu Bandaayithu"	P. B. Sreenivas, S. Janaki	Chi. Udaya Shankar	04:32
2	"Naa Biduvene"	S. P. Balasubrahmanyam, S. Janaki	Chi. Udaya Shankar	04:34
3	"Yelli Neeno Alli Naanu"	S. P. Balasubrahmanyam	Chi. Udaya Shankar	04:13
4	"Yelli Neeno Alli Naanu"	S. Janaki	Chi. Udaya Shankar	04:13
