= Gayathri Maduve =

- Directed by: B. Mallesh
- Written by: B. Mallesh
- Screenplay by: B. Mallesh
- Produced by: Lakshman
- Starring: Anant Nag; Ambika; Roopadevi; Tiger Prabhakar
- Cinematography: B. C. Gowrishankar
- Edited by: P. Bhakthavathsalam
- Music by: Rajan–Nagendra
- Production company: Gayathri Art Film
- Release date: 22 September 1983
- Country: India
- Language: Kannada

Gayathri Maduve is a 1983 Indian Kannada-language film, directed by B. Mallesh and produced by Lakshman. The film stars Anant Nag, Ambika, Roopadevi and Tiger Prabhakar. The film has musical score by Rajan–Nagendra.

== Cast ==
- Anant Nag as Ravi / Prakash
- Ambika as Gayathri
- Roopadevi as Gowri
- Tiger Prabhakar as Maruti
- Jayamalini
- K. S. Ashwath as Gayathri's father
- Vajramuni
- Dinesh as Bhaskar Rao, Ravi's father
- Mysore Lokesh

== Soundtrack ==
The music was composed by Rajan–Nagendra. The composer duo reused the tune of "Preethiya Maathige Ethake Naachike" for the 1983 Telugu movie Moodu Mullu as "Leta Chaligaalulu". (Note: Sri of Telugucinema.com mentions that the Telugu song was reused from a Kannada song, but does not mention the original song's name.)

No.	Song	Singers	Lyrics	Length (m:ss)
1	"Ninna Jaathaka"	S. Janaki, S. P. Balasubrahmanyam	Chi. Udaya Shankar	
2	"Nanna Daiva"	S. Janaki	R. N. Jayagopal	
3	"Preethiya Maathige"	S. P. Balasubrahmanyam, S. Janaki	Chi. Udaya Shankar	
4	"Innu Yake Baralilla"	S. Janaki	Chi. Udaya Shankar	
