= Karulina Kudi =

- VCD cover
- Directed by: V. P. Sarathy
- Written by: V. P. Sarathy
- Produced by: P. Dhanraj
- Starring: Vishnuvardhan; Ambareesh; Sithara
- Cinematography: P. N. Sundaram
- Edited by: Shyam
- Music by: Rajan–Nagendra
- Production company: Sri Dhanalakshmi Creations
- Release date: September 28, 1995
- Running time: 140 minutes
- Country: India
- Language: Kannada

Karulina Kudi is a 1995 Indian Kannada-language drama film directed by V. P. Sarathy and produced by P. Dhanraj. The film stars Vishnuvardhan, Ambareesh and Sithara. The film was widely popular for the songs composed by Rajan–Nagendra upon release.

== Cast ==
- Vishnuvardhan as Nandhan
- Ambareesh as Vasu
- Sithara as Yashoda
- Shamili as Krishnaveni
- Jai Jagadish as Hari
- Doddanna
- Rajanand
- Sathyapriya
- Sriraksha as Prema
- Master Anand

== Soundtrack ==
The music of the film was composed by Rajan–Nagendra. This was the last collaboration of Rajan Nagendra and S Janaki. Their combination started in 1960

Track listing
No.	Title	Singer(s)	Length
1.	"Nanagagi Neenu"	S. P. Balasubrahmanyam, S. Janaki
2.	"Krishna Krishna Ellige Hode"	S. Janaki
3.	"Rattho Rattho"	S. P. Balasubrahmanyam, S. Janaki
4.	"Pakshigale Keli Nannaya Katheya"	S. P. Balasubrahmanyam, S. Janaki
5.	"Amma Amma Ellige Hode"	S. Janaki
6.	"O Malle Hoove"	Rajkumar
