= Huliya Haalina Mevu =

- Poster celebrating the film's 100-day theatrical run
- Directed by: Vijay
- Written by: Bharathisutha
- Screenplay by: Chi. Udayashankar
- Based on: Huliya Haalina Mevu by Bharathisutha
- Produced by: K. C. N. Chandrashekar
- Starring: Rajkumar; Jaya Pradha; Jayachitra; Srinivasa Murthy
- Cinematography: R. Chittibabu
- Edited by: P. Bhaktavatsalam
- Music by: G. K. Venkatesh
- Production company: Rajkamal Arts
- Release date: 17 May 1979
- Running time: 174 minutes
- Country: India
- Language: Kannada

Huliya Haalina Mevu ( transl. The yield of Tiger's milk) is a 1979 Indian Kannada-language epic historical drama film directed by Vijay, based on a novel of the same name by Bharathisutha starring Rajkumar as Chengumani, the commander-in-chief of the 18th-century Kingdom of Coorg. Jayachitra and Jayapradha feature in pivotal roles. The movie was dubbed in Telugu as Prachanda Bheri. This was also Rajkumar's first cinemascope movie.

== Plot ==
Chengumani, a tiger hunter becomes the king's commander-in-chief after saving his life, but his life gets complicated when he falls in love with Poovi and marries her.

== Cast ==
- Dr. Rajkumar as Chengumani
- Jaya Prada as Poovi
- Jayachitra as Thanga
- M. P. Shankar as Dodda Veerappa
- Balakrishna as Uttanayaka
- Vajramuni as Bhima, Uttanayaka's son
- Sampath as Somaiah, Thanga's father
- Shakti Prasad as Muthanna
- Srinivasa Murthy as Kalaiah
- Thoogudeepa Srinivas as Nadatakka Subbaiah
- Tiger Prabhakar as Pemmaiah
- Uma Shivakumar
- M. S. Rajashekar
- Shani Mahadevappa as Biddaiah
- Rajanand as Chikka Virarajendra
- Papamma as Ponnamma, Chengumani's mother
- Bhatti Mahadevappa
- Honnavalli Krishna

== Soundtrack ==
Huliya Haalina Mevu

Soundtrack album by G. K. Venkatesh
- Genre: Feature film soundtrack
- Language: Kannada
- Label: Saregama

The music was composed by G. K. Venkatesh, with lyrics penned by Chi. Udaya Shankar.

=== Tracks ===
Track listing
No.	Title	Lyrics	Singer(s)	Length
1.	"Chinnada Mallige Hoove"	Chi. Udaya Shankar	Rajkumar, S. Janaki	04:33
2.	"Aase Heluvaase"	Chi. Udaya Shankar	P. Susheela, S. Janaki, Rajkumar	05:57
3.	"Beladingalaagi Baa"	Chi. Udaya Shankar	Rajkumar	04:28
4.	"Rajadhi Raja"	Chi. Udaya Shankar	Rajkumar, S. Janaki	06:02

== Trivia ==
- The movie was 7th of the nine movies (excluding cameo appearances in Shiva Mecchida Kannappa and Gandhada Gudi Part 2 )from Dr. Rajkumar - director Vijay duo and the duo's second movie made on the backdrop of royal family after the 1975 classic Mayura.
- The movie has the protagonist enacted by Dr. Rajkumar dying in the climax which is said to have caused a massive outrage among his fans. However, the climax was not changed.
- The movie collected ₹40.50 lakhs within 3 weeks of its release.
