= Veera Sankalpa =

- Directed by: Hunsur Krishnamurthy
- Written by: Hunsur Krishnamurthy
- Screenplay by: Hunsur Krishnamurthy
- Produced by: Hunsur Krishnamurthy
- Starring: Hunsur Krishnamurthy; B. M. Venkatesh; B. S. Dwarakanath; Seetharam
- Cinematography: H. S. Venu
- Edited by: Narayan Rao; P. S. Murthy
- Music by: Rajan–Nagendra
- Production company: Evergreen Production
- Distributed by: Evergreen Production
- Release date: 22 February 1964
- Country: India
- Language: Kannada

Veera Sankalpa is a 1964 Indian Kannada-language film, directed and produced by Hunsur Krishnamurthy. The film stars Hunsur Krishnamurthy, B. M. Venkatesh, B. S. Dwarakanath and Seetharam.This was the debut movie of actress Vanisri.

The movie declares before the start that it is loosely based on the oral legends about the heroism of Lakshamana Nayaka or Yecchamma Nayaka, the loyal commander of Venkatapati Raya I. It is set in the period following the demise of the Vijayanagara Empire after the Talikota Battle when the remnants of the Aravidu dynasty ruled from Penugonda and Chandragiri near Tirupati. H. R. Bhargava was the assistant director of this movie.

== Cast ==
- Hunsur Krishnamurthy
- B. M. Venkatesh
- Adavani Lakshmidevi
- B. S. Dwarakanath
- Vidyasagar (Rajesh)
- Vanisri (Rathnakumari)
- Seetharam
- M. P. Shankar
- B. Jayashree
- Srikanth
- Srirang
- Bangerappa
- Sundar
- Raghu
- Master Narahari Hunsur
- Ramasanjeevaiah
- Lakshmi
- Master Sriprasad Hunsur

== Soundtrack ==
The music was composed by Rajan–Nagendra.

No.	Song	Singers	Lyrics	Length (m:ss)
1	"Haadu Baa Kogile"	Nageshwara Rao	Hunsur Krishnamurthy	02:50
2	"Sityako Sidkyako"	L. R. Eswari	Hunsur Krishnamurthy	03:35
3	"Yaavoorayva"	L. R. Eswari	Hunsur Krishnamurthy	03:32
