= Naa Ninna Bidalaare =

- VCD cover
- Directed by: Vijay
- Screenplay by: M. D. Sundar
- Story by: M. D. Sundar
- Produced by: C. Jayaram
- Starring: Anant Nag; Lakshmi
- Cinematography: S. V. Srikanth
- Edited by: P. Bhaktavatsalam
- Music by: Rajan–Nagendra
- Production company: Chamundeshwari Studio
- Distributed by: Gurujyothi Combines
- Release date: 1979
- Country: India
- Language: Kannada

Naa Ninna Bidalaare ( transl. I won't leave you) is a 1979 Indian Kannada-language horror film directed by Vijay and produced by C. Jayaram who happened to be Parvathamma Rajkumar's sister's husband. The film stars Anant Nag and Lakshmi. The film was remade in Hindi as Mangalsutra, with Anant Nag reprising his role. Na Ninna Bidalaare is regarded as one of best horror films of all time in the Kannada film industry. Na Ninna Bidalaare is the first movie where Anant Nag and Lakshmi acted together, later the pair become a popular onscreen couple in Kannada cinema.

== Plot ==
Krishna (Anant Nag) gets possessed by the ghost of a woman Kaamini (K. Vijaya) whose love he had refused. The rest of the film revolves around Krishnav's wife Gayatri's (Lakshmi) efforts to save her husband from danger.

== Cast ==
- Anant Nag as Krishna
- Lakshmi as Gayatri
- K. Vijaya as Kaamini
- Master Prakash
- K. S. Ashwath as Krishna's father
- Leelavathi as Gayatri's mother
- Balakrishna as Gayatri's father
- Musuri Krishnamurthy
- M. S. Satya
- Shivaprakash

== Soundtrack ==
Naa Ninna Bidalaare

Soundtrack album by Rajan–Nagendra
- Released: 1979
- Language: Kannada
- Label: Saregama

Rajan–Nagendra chronology
Singaporenalli Raja Kulla (1978)	Naa Ninna Bidalaare (1979)	Putani Agent 123 (1979)

The music of the film was composed by the duo Rajan–Nagendra, with lyrics penned by Chi. Udaya Shankar.

=== Track list ===
Title	Singer(s)
"Bidenu Ninna Paada"	S. Janaki
"Endendigoo Naa Ninna"	P. Susheela
"Naanu Neenu Ondada"	S. P. Balasubrahmanyam, S. Janaki
"Hosa Balige Nee Joteyaade"	S. P. Balasubrahmanyam, S. Janaki

== Box-office ==
Na Ninna Bidalaare ran for 100 days at many centres across the Karnataka and it became one of the highest grossing Kannada films of the year 1979.

== Awards ==
Anant Nag won the Filmfare Award for Best Actor – Kannada.
