= Gandhada Gudi =

1973 film directed by Vijay

- 1986 re-release poster
- Directed by: Vijay
- Screenplay by: Vijay; M. D. Sundar
- Story by: M. P. Shankar
- Produced by: M. P. Shankar
- Starring: Rajkumar; Vishnuvardhan; Kalpana; M. P. Shankar
- Cinematography: D. V. Rajaram
- Edited by: Bal G. Yadav
- Music by: Rajan–Nagendra
- Distributed by: Bharani Chithra
- Release date: 1973
- Country: India
- Language: Kannada

Gandhada Gudi ( transl. The abode of Sandalwood trees) is a 1973 Indian Kannada-language action drama film directed by Vijay and produced by M. P. Shankar. Rajkumar in his 150th film portrays an honest forest officer Kumar and Vishnuvardhan plays the antagonist, Anand, though his character is redeemed at the end of the film. Kalpana, M. P. Shankar, Narasimharaju and Balakrishna star in other important roles. The movie also marked the last joint venture of the legendary pair of Rajkumar - Narasimharaju.

The film was remade in Hindi in 1979 as Kartavya. It was dubbed in Malayalam in 1974 as Chandana Kaadu. It was the first Indian film to be made on the themes of forest protection and wildlife conservation.

== Plot ==
Gandhada Gudi follows a range forest officer named Kumar, whose duty it is to protect the forest against poachers and smugglers. These poachers, including Anand, Kumar's brother, cause many problems.

== Cast ==
- Rajkumar as Range Forest Officer Kumar
- Vishnuvardhan as Anand, Kumar's brother
- Kalpana as Lakshmi
- Balakrishna as Raja Venkatappa Nayaka
- Advani Lakshmi Devi as Saraswathi, Kumar and Anand's mother
- Narasimharaju as Shivaji
- M. P. Shankar as Johnny
- Sampath as Senior Forest Officer
- Thoogudeepa Srinivas as Kunju Ahmad
- Shakti Prasad as Raja
- B. Jaya as Gangi
- H. R. Shastry as Hanumayya
- Tiger Prabhakar as Moosa
- Prema Kumari as Putti
- Malur Sonnappa
- Anand Shekhar
- Xavier
- Cheluvaraju
- Abdul Azis
- Borayya
- S. A. V. Swamy
- Mahadevappa
- Nazeer Ahmed
- Louis
- Sriram
- Nandagopal
- Baby Shyam
- Master Virupaksh
- Master Basavaraj
- Master Nataraj

== Production ==
The film features cinematography of the Nagarhole and Bandipur forest in Mysore, the location of the seat of the royal family of Karnataka.

During the shooting of the film where Vishuarvadan's character "shoots" Rajkumar's character's mother, the prop gun was accidentally switched to a real gun. Prabakaran, a forest ranger who realised someone took the gun, ran to the shooting spot to avert untoward incident. Just as Vishnuvardhan was about to pull the trigger, Prabakaran begged for him to stop. The incident caused trauma for Vishnuvardhan who got death threats from Rajkumar fans. Despite this, both Rajkumar and Vishuvardhan remained on good terms afterwards.

== Soundtrack ==
Gandhada Gudi

Soundtrack album by Rajan–Nagendra
- Released: 14 September 1973
- Recorded: 1973
- Genre: Feature film soundtrack
- Length: 12:30
- Language: Kannada
- Label: Saregama

Music for the film and soundtracks were composed by the duo Rajan–Nagendra. The title song, filmed on Karnataka and Kannada is still popular among the Kannadigas. The song can be heard even today on any festival or function in Karnataka.

Track list
No.	Title	Lyrics	Singer(s)	Length
1.	"Naavaaduva Nudiye"	Chi. Udayashankar	P. B. Sreenivas	6:08
2.	"Arerere Ginirama"	Chi. Udaya Shankar	P. Susheela	3:33
3.	"Ellu Hogolla"	Chi. Udaya Shankar	S. Janaki, P. B. Sreenivas	2:49
Total length:				12:30

== Sequel ==
The sequel to Gandhada Gudi had Shiva Rajkumar in the role of a forest officer who is posted in the same forest where his father has created a history. His character now has to carry his father's mission and protect the forest. Many considered the sequel to be a disappointment when compared to the legacy of the original.

== Legacy ==
It was the first Indian movie made on the concept of protection of forests and wildlife conservation. It is the only movie in which Rajkumar and Vishnuvardhan appeared together. The film was seen as a milestone in the career of Rajkumar and also his 150th movie. The movie became a blockbuster and saw a theatrical run of 25 weeks.

This movie was reported to be the first mainstream Indian film on forest conservation. It was the time when CITES – 1973 Convention on International Trade in Endangered Species of Wild Fauna and Flora was signed. CITES aimed to reduce the economic incentive to poach endangered species and destroy their habitat by closing off the international market.The movie was praised for portraying the rich bio diversity of the state of Karnataka.

The film was remade in Hindi in 1979 as Kartavya. It was dubbed in Malayalam in 1974 as Chandana Kaadu. The success of this film prompted NTR to work on a script based on the forest backdrop leading to the 1977 Telugu movie Adavi Ramudu. The success of Gandhada Gudi led to a sequel in 1995 titled Gandhada Gudi Part 2 starring Shiva Rajkumar. The film which speaks about the preservation of forests inspired other Kannada films – Jayasimha, Mrugalaya and Maasti Gudi.

The 2025 movie Brat makes use of the climax scene of this movie in a theatre fight sequence of that movie.

== See also ==
- Bandipur National Park
- Nagarhole National Park
