= Karnataka Suputra =

Indian film

- Directed by: Vijay
- Written by: Vijay
- Produced by: Vijay
- Starring: Vishnuvardhan; Rituparna Sengupta.
- Cinematography: N. S. Raju
- Edited by: K. Narasaiah
- Music by: M. M. Keeravani
- Release date: 29 March 1996
- Country: India
- Language: Kannada

Karnataka Suputra (transl. Son of Karnataka) is a 1996 Indian Kannada film written and directed by Vijay, his final film as director. The film stars Vishnuvardhan and Rituparna Sengupta in her Kannada debut.

== Cast ==
- Vishnuvardhan
- Rituparna Sengupta
- Vajramuni
- Rajesh
- C. R. Simha
- Shivaram

== Production ==
Karnataka Suputra was the final film directed by Vijay before his death in 2020. The dialogues of the film were written by Ravi Srivatsa. The film marked the debut of Bengali actress Rituparna Sengupta in Kannada films. The film was shot in Bangalore, Ooty, Mysore and Coorg.

== Soundtrack ==
Soundtrack was composed by M. M. Keeravani. This was Keeravani's second collaboration with Vishnuvardhan after Appaji which released the same year. They went on to join hands later for Deepavali (2000) and Jamindarru (2002). This is also the only movie where both Dr.Rajkumar and Dr.Vishnuvardhan did playback singing for the same movie.

#	Title	Singer(s)
1	Aa Vidhi Thanda Sambandha	Dr. Rajkumar
2	Hoobanada Sihi Jenu Idu	S. P. Balasubrahmanyam, Malgudi Shubha
3	Maduveyemba Baala Bandha	S.P. Balasubrahmanyam
4	Nagutha Novanu Mareyutha	Dr.Vishnuvardhan
5	Pancharangi Pancharangi	S.P. Balasubrahmanyam, K. S. Chithra
6	Udayavayithu Prema Kavana	K.S. Chithra, S.P. Balasubrahmanyam
