= Beluvalada Madilalli =

1975 film

- Directed by: Geethapriya
- Written by: Geethapriya
- Screenplay by: Geethapriya
- Story by: H. Devirappa (Based on Novel Beluvalada Madilalli)
- Produced by: Smt Vanajakshi Devaraj
- Starring: Rajesh; Kalpana; Balakrishna; Venkatarao Thalageri
- Cinematography: T. V. Balu
- Edited by: Bal G. Yadav
- Music by: Rajan–Nagendra
- Production company: Nirupama Movies
- Distributed by: Nirupama Movies
- Release date: 27 October 1975
- Running time: 137 minutes
- Country: India
- Language: Kannada

Beluvalada Madilalli is a 1975 Indian Kannada-language film, directed by Geethapriya and produced by Smt Vanajakshi Devaraj. The film stars Rajesh, Kalpana, Balakrishna and Venkatarao Thalageri. The film has musical score by Rajan–Nagendra.

== Cast ==
- Rajesh as Maada
- Kalpana as Girija
- T. N. Balakrishna
- Venkatarao Thalageri
- Shakti Prasad
- Master Nataraj
- B. S. Jayakumar
- Chandrashekar
- Devaraj
- V. Gopinath
- Pandu
- Sharath
- Rajashekar
- M. Jayashree
- Girija
- Indrani
- Baby Vani
- Jyothilatha
- Madhuri
- Hemavathi
- Lakshmi
- Kamal D. Kallimani
- Sarigama Viji (credited as Vijaykumar)
- Hanumesh
- Master Yogish
- Master Srinivas
- Shanthala
- Baby Savitha

== Soundtrack ==
The music was composed by Rajan–Nagendra.

No.	Song	Singers	Lyrics	Length (m:ss)
1	"Beluvadhe Madilalli"	S. P. Balasubrahmanyam, S. Janaki	Geetha Priya	03:28
2	"Muthu Malegagi Oothu"	Vani Jairam	Geetha Priya	03:39
3	"Notakke Nota"	S. P. Balasubrahmanyam, S. Janaki	Geetha Priya	03:42
4	"Yellarana Kayo Dyavre"	S. P. Balasubrahmanyam	Geetha Priya	03:38
