= Vadiraj =

- Born: 3 January 1927
- Died: 6 February 2004 (aged 77)
- Other names: P. Vadiraj, U. S. Vadiraj
- Occupations: Actor, director, producer
- Years active: 1956–2003

Vadiraj Srinivas Upadhyaya was an Indian actor, director and producer in Kannada cinema. He along with his sister noted Kannada actress Harini and brother Jawahar produced many award-winning movies in Kannada. As actor, he was known for comedy roles in films.

Apart from winning two national awards as a director and producer, his directorial Innondu Mukha screened at IFFI.

== Personal life ==
His father was Srinivas Upadhyaya Paniyadi (S.U.Paniyadi), freedom fighter, Tulu and Kannada literary writer.

== Filmography ==
As director, producer, and writer

Year	Film	Director	Producer	Writer	Notes
1963	Nanda Deepa		Yes	Story	
1964	Naandi		Yes		
1964	Navajeevana		Yes		
1969	Namma Makkalu		Executive		
1970	Seetha	Yes			
1972	Naa Mechida Huduga		Co-producer		Also playback singer
1973	Seetheyalla Savithri	Yes		Yes	
1977	Kakana Kote		Executive		
1979	Dange Edda Makkalu	Yes		Screenplay	
1980	Nammammana Sose	Yes		Screenplay	

As actor

- Kokila Vaani (1956)
- Krishna Garudi (1958)
- Dharma Vijaya (1959)
- Swarna Gowri (1962)
- Nanda Deepa (1963)
- Santha Thukaram (1963)
- Naandi (1964)
- Navajeevana (1964)
- Premakkoo Permitte (1967)
- Sri Purandara Dasaru (1967)
- Namma Makkalu (1969)
- Aliya Geleya (1971)
- Mukthi (1971)
- Naa Mechida Huduga (1972)
- Badavara Bandhu (1976)
- Maya Manushya (1976)
- Naa Ninna Mareyalare (1976)
- Kakana Kote (1977)
- Premayana (1978)
- Kaviratna Kalidasa (1983)
- Ade Kannu (1985)
- Nee Thanda Kanike (1985)
- Ganda Mane Makkalu (1988)
- Mithileya Seetheyaru (1988)
- Bala Hombale (1989)
- Bhujangayyana Dashavathara (1991)
- Athimadhura Anuraga (1992)
- Innondu Mukha (1998)
- Khaki (2003)

Vadiraj received the Dr. Rajkumar Award in 1998–99 for his dedicated service to Kannada cinema and later served as chairman of the Karnataka State Film Awards committee in 2001–2002.

== Awards ==
10th National Film Awards

- Best Kannada Feature Film - Nanda Deepa

27th National Film Awards

- Best Children's Film -- Dangeyedda Makkalu
