= Boregowda Bangalorige Banda =

Boregowda Bengalurige Banda
- Directed by: B. A. Arasu Kumar
- Screenplay by: B. A. Arasu Kumar
- Story by: B. A. Arasu Kumar
- Produced by: S. Shivashankarappa; Kalleshappa; Devaramuni Shanmukappa; H. M. Jayanna; S. D. Umapathi
- Starring: Rajesh; Leelavathi
- Cinematography: V. Manohar; Vijayaraghavan
- Edited by: M. Umanath
- Music by: Rajan–Nagendra
- Production company: Sri Mallikarjuna Enterprises
- Release date: 1970
- Running time: 133 minutes
- Country: India
- Language: Kannada

Boregowda Bangalorige Banda ( transl. Boregowda came to Bangalore) is a 1970 Indian Kannada-language film written and directed by B. A. Arasu Kumar, and produced by S. Shivashankarappa, Kalleshappa, Devaramuni Shanmukappa, H. M. Jayanna and S. D. Umapathi under the banner Sri Mallikarjuna Enterprises. It stars Rajesh and Leelavathi; B. Vijayalakshmi and Srinath feature in supporting roles. The title of the film is based on an adage which describes the predicament of a small town man struck by the glamour and glitz of the city.

== Synopsis ==
Boregowda leaves his village for Bangalore. He is forced to face its high costs and realities. Despite the struggles, he adapts and builds a secure, stable life for himself and his wife.

== Cast ==
- Rajesh as Boregowda
- Leelavathi as Gowri
- B. Vijayalakshmi / Vandana as Lakshmi
- Srinath as Raja
- Shakti Prasad as Hulikunte Hanuma

== Soundtrack ==
Boregowda Bangalorige Banda

Soundtrack album by Rajan–Nagendra
- Released: 1970
- Genre: Feature film soundtrack
- Length: 10:17
- Label: Saregama

The duo of Rajan–Nagendra scored the film's soundtrack and background score. The soundtrack album consists of three tracks. Chi. Udayashankar wrote lyrics for the tracks.

Track listing
No.	Title	Singer(s)	Length
1.	"Alli Illi Hudukutha"	S. P. Balasubrahmanyam, P. Susheela	4:07
2.	"Nammadhe Naadella"	S. P. Balasubrahmanyam	3:15
3.	"Malagova Maavina"	L. R. Eswari	3:27
Total length:			10:17
