= Kadina Rahasya =

- Directed by: Geethapriya
- Written by: Geethapriya
- Screenplay by: M. P. Shankar
- Story by: M. P. Shankar
- Produced by: R. Rangappa; M. P. Shankar
- Starring: Yashraj; Sudarshan; K. S. Ashwath; Narasimharaju
- Cinematography: R. N. K. Prasad
- Edited by: Bal G. Yadav
- Music by: Satyam
- Production company: Sri Bharani Chithralaya
- Distributed by: Sri Bharani Chithralaya
- Release date: 25 March 1969
- Running time: 137 min
- Country: India
- Language: Kannada

Kadina Rahasya is a 1969 Indian Kannada film, directed by Geethapriya and produced by R. Rangappa and M. P. Shankar. The film stars Yashraj, Sudarshan, K. S. Ashwath and Narasimharaju in the lead roles. The film has musical score by Satyam.

== Cast ==
- M. P. Shankar as Kaala
- Sudarshan as Sunder
- Shailashree
- K. S. Ashwath as Dr. Ranganath
- Narasimharaju as Babu
- Dwarakish as Mani
- Tiger Prabhakar as Tribal Warrior
- Yashraj as Raja
