= Mayeya Musuku =

- Directed by: B. Y. Ramdas
- Written by: B. Shamasundara (dialogues)
- Screenplay by: B. Shamasundara
- Story by: B. Shamasundara (Based on Story Haavu Matthu Huttha)
- Produced by: N. Umapathi; H. K. Srinivasa; B. Y. Ramdas
- Starring: Rajesh; Srilalitha; T. N. Balakrishna; B. S. Nithyanand
- Cinematography: D. V. Rajaram; Meenakshi Sundaram
- Edited by: Sriramulu
- Music by: T. A. Mothi
- Production company: Kalashree Cine Productions
- Distributed by: Kalashree Cine Productions
- Release date: 21 April 1979
- Running time: 92 min
- Country: India
- Language: Kannada

Mayeya Musuku is a 1980 Indian Kannada film, directed by B. Y. Ramdas and produced by N. Umapathi, H. K. Srinivasa and B. Y. Ramdas. The film stars Rajesh, Srilalitha, T. N. Balakrishna and B. S. Nithyanand in the lead roles. The film has musical score by T. A. Mothi.

== Cast ==
- Rajesh
- Srilalitha
- T. N. Balakrishna
- B. S. Nithyanand
- Shashikala
- B. Shyamasundara
- S. V. Chalam
- Veerendra Kumar
- Sundaramma
- Indrani
- Rathnamma
- Bhagya
- Jamuna
- Geetha
- Hemavathi
- Madevi
- Rani
- V. Sathyanarayana
- Dr. Sadanand
