= Mojugara Sogasugara =

- Directed by: Vijay
- Written by: Kunigal Nagabhushan; Kunigal Vasanth (dialogue)
- Screenplay by: Vijay
- Based on: Ramudu Bheemudu (1964)
- Produced by: N. Kumar
- Starring: Vishnuvardhan; Shruti; Sonakshi
- Cinematography: Johnny Lal
- Edited by: S. Prasad
- Music by: Hamsalekha
- Production company: Sri Lakshmi Films
- Release date: 3 March 1995
- Running time: 143 minutes
- Country: India
- Language: Kannada

Mojugara Sogasugara is a 1995 Indian Kannada-language action comedy film written and directed by Vijay. The film marks actor Vishnuvardhan's 150th film. Vishnuvardhan appeared in dual roles, along with Shruti and Sonakshi in other pivotal roles. The film is a remake of 1964 Telugu film Ramudu Bheemudu.

== Cast ==
- Vishnuvardhan as in dual role
  - Vijay, an innocent man
  - Vinod, a fun-loving man
- Shruti as Shanta, Vijay’s lover
- Sonakshi as Anjana, Vinod’s lover
- Doddanna as Vijay and Vinod’s uncle
- Lokesh as Bhoopathi Rao
- Pandari Bai as Vinod's adopted mother
- Tennis Krishna as Vinod's friend
- Jayanthi as Sulochana, Vijay and Vinod’s sister
- Sathya Bhama
- Sihi Kahi Chandru as Bhujang Rao
- Rama Murthy as Govinda
- Keerthi
- Dingri Nagaraj
- Shivaram
- Baby Ranjitha as Meena
- Rajanand as Raghunatha Rai
- Sathyajit
- Kunigal Vasanth

== Production ==
Keerthi, Vishnuvardhan's daughter made her debut as costume designer with this film.

== Soundtrack ==
The music of the film was composed by and lyrics written by Hamsalekha. After release, the soundtrack was well received. Audio was released on Lahari Music.

The song Kannadave Nammamma sung by Vishnuvardhan became popular. It is rated as one of the top 10 Kannada patriotic songs by Filmibeat.

Track listing
No.	Title	Singer(s)	Length
1.	"Yaramma Ivanu"	Mano, Manjula Gururaj
2.	"Hoovamma Hoovamma"	Mano, Latha Hamsalekha
3.	"Chorarigondu Kaala"	Mano
4.	"Mojugarana Sogasugarana"	Mano, Manjula Gururaj
5.	"Kannadave Nammamma"	Vishnuvardhan
