= Badavara Bandhu =

- Directed by: Vijay
- Screenplay by: Shankar-Sundar
- Produced by: N. Ramaswamy
- Starring: Rajkumar; Jayamala
- Cinematography: Annayya; Mallik
- Edited by: P. Bhakhavatsalam
- Music by: M. Ranga Rao
- Distributed by: CNR Shakthi Productions
- Release date: 1976
- Running time: 143 minutes
- Country: India
- Language: Kannada

Badavara Bandhu is a 1976 Indian Kannada language drama film directed by Vijay. It stars Rajkumar and Jayamala. The movie is also notable for the negative character played by K. S. Ashwath.The movie saw a theatrical run of 25 weeks and was declared a Blockbuster at the box office.

== Plot ==
Despite being a B. A. graduate, Ranga is forced to work as a server in Annapoorna Hotel run by Badrinath due to poverty. His father who suffers from hemiparesis was once a rich man and lived a luxurious life until he was cheated by a shrewd Nagappa.

Ranga is loved by everyone in the hotel. He comes across different types of people in his daily life. He rescues Susheela from committing suicide and gives her a new reason to live. He reforms an alcoholic Chayapathi and mediates all the problems involving the workers. However, his moralities and sincerity gets him into the bad books of Badrinath and his son Gopinath. Ranga sends a telegram to Susheela's father who happens to be the same Nagappa who cheated his father. It is revealed that Susheela left her house since her father forcibly married a young girl, Radha, who happened to be Susheela's friend. She refuses to accompany him despite his pleas. He soon gets into an accident involving Gopinath but keeps mum upon knowing that he is the son of his old confidante Badrinath. With his help, he manipulates Susheela into accompanying him to Badri's house.

In a flashback it is revealed that Ranga is in fact the eldest son of Badrinath who was adapted by Ranga's foster father at a very young age. He also provided enough money for looking after the other two children. It was the time when Badrinath was poor and didn't want his children to die of starvation. However, this news doesn't go well with his sick wife Annapoorna who dies soon. Badrinath blames himself for her death and vows to find his son.

Meanwhile, Nagappa and Badrinath decides to conduct the marriage of Gopi and Susheela. They soon dìscovers that Susheela and Ranga are in love with each other. When he refuses to forget her, Badrinath plots against him. However, the plan fails and a fake godman is exposed by Ranga further elevating his position among the workers and customers. The cold war between Badrinath and Ranga reaches its peak when the latter spearheads a satyagraha against Badri for refusing to raise the salary of workers. Nagappa asks Badri to give some money to Ranga's father so as to make him convince Ranga to leave the city. At this juncture Badrinath discovers that Ranga was his long lost son after meeting Ranga's father. He has a change of heart and goes in search of him.

Gopi who is infuriated by the turn of events kidnaps Ranga's father and threatens to kill him unless Ranga signs the necessary documents to quit his job and leave the city. However, Ranga manages to overpower the goons hired by Gopi and rescue his father. Gopi decides to kill him but is stopped by Badri at the last moment who unburdens the truth. The family unites and Ranga and Gopi embrace each other. Later, Badrinath declares to raise the wages of the workers who in turn praise Ranga.

== Cast ==
- Rajkumar as Ranganatha "Server Ranga"
- Jayamala as Susheela
- Sampath as Ranga's foster father
- K. S. Ashwath as Badrinatha, Ranga's biological father
- Balakrishna as Nagappa, Susheela's father
- Vajramuni as Gopinatha, Badrinatha's son
- Thoogudeepa Srinivas as Photographer
- Tiger Prabhakar as thug in hotel
- Vadiraj as Varahamurthy
- Joker Shyam as Ganesh
- B. Hanumanthachar as Music director
- Shani Mahadevappa
- M. S. Sathya as Chayapathi
- Honnavalli Krishna as Ramaswamy
- G. R. Bheema Rao as Hotel employee
- Sharapanjara Srinivas Ayyangar as Hotel employee
- Comedian Guggu as Hotel employee
- V. Ashwath Narayan as Hotel employee
- Sabitha Devi
- Indira
- Susheela Naidu
- Sunanda
- Jayakala

== Soundtrack ==
The music of the film was composed by M. Ranga Rao, with lyrics for the soundtrack penned by Chi. Udaya Shankar. The song Naidileyu Hunnimeya was found in the audio only and was not present in the movie.

=== Track list ===
#	Title	Singer(s)
1	"Naga Beda Naga Beda"	P. B. Sreenivas
2	"Ninna Kangala Bisiya Hanigalu"	Rajkumar
3	"Ninna Nudiyu Honna Nudiyu"	Rajkumar
4	"Naidileyu Hunnimeya"	P. Susheela
