= Sedina Hakki =

- CD cover
- Directed by: Dorai–Bhagavan
- Written by: T. K. Rama Rao
- Produced by: Mohan Sharma
- Starring: Ananth Nag; Lakshmi; Tiger Prabhakar
- Cinematography: R. Chittibabu; C. Mahendra
- Edited by: P. Bhaktavatsala
- Music by: Rajan–Nagendra
- Production company: Varalakshmi Movies
- Release date: 1985
- Running time: 137 minutes
- Country: India
- Language: Kannada

Sedina Hakki (transl. Revenge Bird) is a 1985 Kannada-language film, directed by Dorai–Bhagavan, based on the novel of the same name by T. K. Rama Rao. The film stars Ananth Nag and Lakshmi. This was the last film where both paired with each other This was touted to be the 1000th movie of Kannada film industry, but ultimately lost to Devarelliddane.

The film's score and songs were composed by Rajan–Nagendra.

== Cast ==
- Ananth Nag as Shankar
- Lakshmi as Anita/Gowri
- Tiger Prabhakar as Chandrakanth
- Rajeev as Suryakanth
- Jayamalini as Basanti
- Dinesh
- Kamanidharan
- Lakshman
- Thimmaiah
- Shanthamma

== Soundtrack ==
The music was composed by Rajan–Nagendra duo, with lyrics by R. N. Jayagopal.

Track listing
No.	Title	Singer(s)	Length
1.	"Mava Mava"	S. P. Sailaja	04:42
2.	"Ee Kangala Savi Mathali"	S. P. Balasubrahmanyam, S. Janaki	04:45
3.	"Hosa Yauvvana"	S. P. Balasubrahmanyam, S. Janaki	04:35
4.	"Nayanada Thumba"	S. P. Balasubrahmanyam, S. Janaki, Mohan Sharma	04:41
