= Gandhada Gudi Part 2 =

1994 film directed by Vijay

Gandhada Gudi Part-2
- Film poster
- Directed by: Vijay
- Written by: M. P. Shankar
- Story by: Vijay
- Produced by: M. P. Shankar
- Starring: Shiva Rajkumar; Rajkumar; Rajeshwari; Tara
- Cinematography: Mallikarjuna
- Edited by: Victor Yadav
- Music by: Rajan–Nagendra
- Production company: Bharani Chitra
- Release date: 17 March 1994
- Running time: 151 minutes
- Country: India
- Language: Kannada

Gandhada Gudi Part 2 is a 1994 Indian Kannada-language adventure film directed by Vijay and produced by M. P. Shankar. A sequel to Gandhada Gudi (1973), the film stars Shiva Rajkumar, Tiger Prabhakar, Rajeshwari and Charan Raj. Dr. Rajkumar, who featured in the prequel as the main lead, made a brief appearance in the film. The film's soundtrack was composed by Rajan–Nagendra.

== Cast ==
- Dr. Rajkumar as Kumar in a Cameo at Climax
- Shiva Rajkumar
- Rajeshwari
- Tiger Prabhakar
- Charan Raj
- Tara
- K. S. Ashwath
- Advani Lakshmi Devi
- B. Jaya
- M. P. Shankar as Johny, Guest Appearance

== Soundtrack ==
The soundtrack of the film was composed by Rajan–Nagendra.

Track listing
No.	Title	Lyrics	Singer(s)	Length
1.	"Naavaduva Nudiye"	Chi. Udaya Shankar	Rajkumar
2.	"Gandhada Gudige Banda"	Chi. Udaya Shankar	S. P. Balasubrahmanyam, Manjula Gururaj
3.	"Minchu Maiyyalli"	Chi. Udaya Shankar	S. P. Balasubrahmanyam, K. S. Chithra
4.	"Ninne Thanka"	Chi. Udaya Shankar	K. S. Chithra
5.	"Tony Namma Tony"	Chi. Udaya Shankar	S. P. Balasubrahmanyam
