= Tiger Prabhakar =

Indian Kannada film actor (1948–2001)

- Born: Prabhakar; 30 March 1948; Bangalore, Kingdom of Mysore, India
- Died: 25 March 2001 (aged 52); Bengaluru, Karnataka, India
- Occupations: Actor; director; composer
- Spouse(s): Jayamala (m. 1985; div. 1994) Anju (m. 1996; sep. 1997)
- Children: 5, including Vinod Prabhakar

Tiger Prabhakar (30 March 1948 – 25 March 2001), also known as Kannada Prabhakar, was an Indian actor who predominantly worked in Kannada and Telugu cinema. He also acted in a few Malayalam, Tamil and Hindi films. He was reported to have appeared in more than 400 films.

== Career ==
Prabhakar started his career by appearing in small roles in Kannada movies and went on to become one of the most sought after villains in Kannada and Telugu movies during the late 1970s and 1980s. He graduated to playing full-fledged action hero roles in Kannada movies from 1983-84 onward and remained one of the most sought after heroes until 1993-94. He made a successful pair with all the top Kannada heroines of the time like Jayamala, Aarathi, Bharathi, Lakshmi and Jayanthi. Prabhakar also directed more than 10 films in Kannada in which he starred as the hero.

=== Acting style ===
Prabhakar's unique acting style, his physique helped him become extremely popular amongst the masses. He flourished in action sequences. He even excelled in his comedic timing and excelled in many movies in comedy scenes as is seen in many movies where he played Anant Nag's friend in movies like Nanna Devaru, Dhairya Lakshmi, Gayathri Maduve. He would wear a cross to the sets, being a Christian, but would be asked to hide or remove it sometimes.

Prabhakar introduced Kanglish, a mix of Kannada and English dialogues, to Kannada movies.

== Personal life ==
Prabhakar followed the Christian faith. Contemporary media reports following his death quoted Prabhakar saying at an event that he was married five times. His first marriage yielded three children: two daughters, Bharathi and Geetha, and a son, Vinod. He was then married to actress Jayamala, and they had one child together: daughter Soundarya. With his third wife, actress Anju, Prabhakar had one son. He also reportedly dated model and actress Dolly Minhas.

It was reported that Prabhakar met with a motorcycle accident in the mid-1980s. Health issues related to this incident cropped up later, leading to gangrene on his legs. In early March 2001, he was admitted to Mallya Hospital in Bangalore for treatment of jaundice. His condition deteriorated and he died on 25 March. The cause of death was reported as multi-organ failure, primarily kidney failure, after a prolonged illness.

In later interviews, his son Vinod clarified the rumours that circulated about the actor's illness and death, including reports claiming amputation due to gangrene. However, the family stated that these claims were incorrect and that he died due to complications from illness leading to organ failure.

== Filmography ==
=== Kannada ===
Year	Title	Role	Note
1969	Kadina Rahasya	Tribal Warrior	
1969	Punya Purusha		
1969	Mathrubhoomi		
1970	Kallara Kalla		
1970	Modala Rathri	Anthony	
1970	Baalu Belagithu	The ruffian who attacks Lakshmi (Bharathi)	
1970	Paropakari		
1970	Mahadiya Mane		
1971	Prathidhwani		
1972	Nari Munidare Mari	Member of bandits gang	
1973	Triveni		
1973	Cow Boy Kulla		
1973	Gandhada Gudi	Moosa	
1974	Professor Huchuraya		
1974	Anna Attige	Dacoit	
1975	Kalla Kulla		
1975	Bhagya Jyothi		
1975	Naga Kanye		
1975	Mayura		
1976	Bengaluru Bhootha		
1976	Raja Nanna Raja		
1976	Bangarada Gudi		
1976	Badavara Bandhu		
1976	Aparadhi		
1977	Lakshmi Nivasa		
1977	Giri Kanye		
1977	Shrimanthana Magalu		
1977	Sahodarara Savaal	Kaalappa	
1977	Olavu Geluvu		
1977	Kittu Puttu	Peter	
1978	Shankar Guru		
1978	Operation Diamond Racket	David	
1978	Vasantha Lakshmi		
1978	Thayige Thakka Maga	Anthony	
1979	Seetharamu		
1979	Huliya Haalina Mevu		
1979	Pakka Kalla		
1979	Preethi Madu Thamashe Nodu		
1979	Vijay Vikram	Chengappa	
1979	Putani Agent 123		
1979	Naniruvude Ninagagi		
1979	Nanobba Kalla	Chandru	
1980	Point Parimala	Cheeta	
1980	Nanna Rosha Nooru Varusha		
1980	Rama Parushurama		
1980	Kaalinga	Danny	
1980	Kulla Kulli	Jeeva	
1980	Auto Raja	Rodrigues	
1980	Ravichandra	Shatranj	
1980	Prema Anuraga		
1980	Moogana Sedu	Robert	
1980	Haddina Kannu		
1980	Simha Jodi	Louis	
1980	Vasantha Geetha	Narahari	
1980	Aarada Gaaya		
1980	Janma Janmada Anubandha		
1980	Pattanakke Banda Pathniyaru	Fateh Khan	
1981	Thayiya Madilalli		
1981	Havina Hede	Antony	
1981	Antha	Mekjee Topiwala	
1981	Prachanda Putanigalu	Rudra	
1981	Naga Kala Bhairava		
1981	Geetha	Astrologer	
1981	Maha Prachandaru	Mohan	
1981	Devara Aata		
1981	Ganesha Mahime		
1981	Snehitara Savaal	Sangram	
1981	Bhaari Bharjari Bete	Gajendra	
1981	Shikari	Johnny	
1982	Chellida Raktha	Basavayya	
1982	Sahasa Simha	Nandanlal	
1982	Archana		
1982	Prema Matsara	Inspector Prabhakar	
1982	Mullina Gulabi		
1982	Mutthinantha Atthige		
1982	Benki Chendu	Nanjunda	
1982	Karmika Kallanalla	Wilson	
1982	Garuda Rekhe	Narasimha	
1982	Boodi Mucchida Kenda		
1982	Ajith	Ali	
1982	Oorige Upakari	Bairaa	
1982	Tony	Sudheer	
1982	Jimmy Gallu	Prabhakar	
1982	Nyaya Ellide	Javed	
1982	Nanna Devaru		
1982	Kannu Theresida Hennu	Bettayya aka Betta	
1982	Khadeema Kallaru	Ravi	
1983	Simhasana		
1983	Onde Guri		
1983	Jaggu	Raghunath	
1983	Nyaya Geddithu	Santosh	
1983	Chandi Chamundi	Basavaraj	
1983	Chakravyuha	Anil Kumar	
1983	Dampathiyaru		
1983	Sididedda Sahodara	Jagga	
1983	Kranthiyogi Basavanna		
1983	Mutthaide Bhagya	Rajashekhar	
1983	Geluvu Nannade	Mahendra	
1983	Hasida Hebbuli	Patel	
1983	Mududida Tavare Aralithu		
1983	Gayathri Maduve		
1983	Karune Illada Kanoonu		
1983	Prema Yuddha		
1984	Raktha Tilaka	Ramaiah	
1984	Huliyada Kala	Kala aka Kali Prasad	
1984	Vigneshwara Vahana	Vasu and Vinod (Double Role)	
1984	Jiddu		
1984	Thayi Nadu		
1984	Huli Hejje	Purushottam	
1984	Kanoonige Saval	Raja Venkatappa Nayaka	Special Appearance in a Skit
1984	Premigala Saval	Ramanna	
1984	Hosa Ithihasa		
1984	Preethi Vathsalya	Prabhakar	
1985	Kadina Raja	Raja	
1985	Pralaya Rudra		
1985	Sedina Hakki	Chandrakanth	
1985	Swabhimana	Anand	
1985	Thayi Mamathe	Triple role	
1986	Thayiye Nanna Devaru	Narasimha	
1986	Kedi No. 1	Raju	
1986	Agni Parikshe	Jagannath	
1986	Seelu Nakshathra		
1986	Tiger	Inspector Bharat	
1986	Belli Naga	Bhargava	
1986	Aparadhi Nanalla	Bhoopathi	
1987	Premaloka	College principal	
1987	Onde Goodina Hakkigalu	Kapanipathi	
1987	Huli Hebbuli	Vijay	
1987	Sathwa Pareekshe		
1987	Thaliya Aane	Vikram	
1987	Agni Parva	Dharmaraj	
1987	Bedi	Prathap	
1987	Bandha Muktha	Anthony	
1987	Athiratha Maharatha	Prithviraj	
1988	Shakthi	Gopi Shakthi	
1988	Kirathaka	SP Rajesh	
1988	Bharath	Bharath	
1988	Kampana	Dr. Anand	
1988	Mathru Vathsalya	Prabhakar	
1988	Dharmathma	Father Thomas and Richard	
1988	Nee Nanna Daiva	Prathap	
1989	Mutthinantha Manushya	Shivu	
1989	Bidisada Bandha	SP Rajasekhar	
1989	Padma Vyuha	Ashok Kumar	
1989	Bangarada Baduku		
1989	Idu Saadhya	Muniyappa	
1989	Onti Salaga	Pratap	
1989	Namma Bhoomi	General Prabhakar	
1989	Hosa Kavya	Soori	
1989	Raja Yuvaraja		
1989	En Swamy Aliyandre	Vishwanath	
1990	Ranabheri	Jagadish	
1990	Pundara Ganda		
1990	Tiger Gangu		
1990	Kiladi Thatha	Triple role	
1990	Trinethra	Karthik	
1990	Sididedda Gandu	Vijay and Ashok	
1990	Raja Kempu Roja	Anand	
1990	Ashoka Chakra	Rajashekhar	
1990	Challenge	Prabhakar	
1991	Varagala Bete		
1991	Prema Pareekshe	Lakshmana	
1991	CBI Vijay	Vijay	
1991	Keralida Kesari	Jayanth	
1991	C. B. I. Shiva		
1991	Central Rowdy		
1991	Bombay Dada	Subhash	
1991	Mathru Bhagya	Pradeep	
1991	Kiladi Gandu	Raghuveer	
1991	Kaliyuga Bheema	Rajasekhar Gonsalves Mohammad Ali aka Raja	
1992	Putta Hendthi	Manja	
1992	Samara Simha		
1992	Belliyappa Bangarappa		
1993	Vikram	Vikram	
1993	Jaga Mechida Huduga	Nagaraj Rao	
1993	Bhavya Bharatha	Siddhartha	
1993	Jwala	Manohar	
1993	Mahendra Varma		
1993	Jailer Jagannath	Jagannath	
1993	Kempaiah IPS	Halappa	
1994	Time Bomb	Police Commissioner Durai	
1994	Karulina Koogu		
1994	Gandhada Gudi Part 2		
1994	Mr. Mahesh Kumar		
1994	Gopi Kalyana	Bhima	
1994	Mayor Prabhakar	Prabhakar	
1995	Chinnada Raja		
1995	Yama Kinkara	Yamadharmaraja	
1995	Chiranjeevi Rajegowda		
1995	Mr. Vasu		
1996	Boss	Bhaskar	
1996	Ranger		
1997	Cheluva	Prathap	
1998	Arjun Abhimanyu		
1998	My Dear Tiger	Rajashekhar	
1998	Marthanda		
1998	King		
1999	Khalanayaka		
2000	Minchu	Himself	
2001	Mysore Huli	Mahendra	Posthumous release
2004	Real Rowdy	S.P. Chaudhary	Posthumous release
2005	Good Bad Ugly		Posthumous release

=== Telugu ===
Year	Film	Role	Notes
1971	Chalaki Rani Kiladi Raja	Joseph	Debut Film in Telugu
1972	Nijam Nirupistha	Gang member	
1978	Adavi Manushulu		
1978	Lawyer Viswanath	Soda Jaggu	
1978	Dongala Veta	Dancer in song	
1978	Annadammula Savaal	Bhayankar	
1979	Yugandhar		
1979	Iddaru Asadhyule	Jagan	
1980	Chuttalunnaru Jagratha	Katthula Rathi	
1980	Bangaru Bava	Sanyasi Babu	
1981	Gharana Gangulu	Syam	
1981	Chattaniki Kallu Levu	Javed	
1982	Billa Ranga	Raviraj	
1982	Pratigna	Hitman	
1983	Roshagadu	Bhayankar	
1983	Puli Bebbuli	Rudraiah	
1983	Moogavani Paga	Murder Maridayya	Moogana Sedu remake
1983	Palleturi Pidugu	Drunken miscreant	
1983	Dharma Poratam	Ranga	
1985	Jwala	Sarvottama Rao	
1985	Pattabhishekam	Mastan Rao	
1986	Brahmastram	Nagaraju	
1986	Vikram	Sardar	
1986	Ide Naa Samadhanam	Jaganmohan Rao	
1986	Police Officer	SP Bhavani/ Prabhakar	Dual role
1986	Ravana Brahma	Tiger Dasu	
1986	Kirathakudu	Snake	
1986	Rakshasudu	Vankachakra Ram Murthy	
1987	Rakshasa Samharam	Dada Chanakya	
1987	Thandri Kodukula Challenge	Narahari	
1987	Prema Samrat	Jagga Rao	
1987	Muddayi	Ranjit Kumar	
1987	Pasivadi Pranam	Inspector Reddy	
1987	Jebu Donga	Jimoomba	
1989	Vicky Daada	Prabhakar	
1989	Palnati Rudraiah	Saindhava Rao	
1990	Jagadeka Veerudu Athiloka Sundari	KP	
1990	Neti Siddhartha	Jogender	
1990	Kodama Simham	Gajapati	
1993	Nippu Ravva	Prabhakar	

=== Tamil ===
Year	Film	Role	Notes
1971	Kettikaran	Fight Master	
1977	Gaayathri		
1978	Idhu Eppadi Irukku	Sastry	
1978	Thai Meethu Sathiyam	Balu	
1980	Kaalam Bathil Sollum	Thandavan	
1980	Anbukku Naan Adimai	Velu	
1981	Amara Kaaviyam	Chinnadurai	
1982	Thyagi	Prathap	
1985	Annai Bhoomi 3D	General Prabhakar	
1992	Annaamalai	Don	
1992	Pandian	Parameshwaran	
1993	Rojavai Killathe	Peter	
1995	Muthu	Pratap Rayudu	

=== Malayalam ===
Year	Film	Role	Notes
1993	Dhruvam	Hyder Marakkar	
1993	Mafia	Devaraja Gowda	
1997	Ranger	Tiger	

=== Hindi ===
Year	Film	Role	Notes
1984	Inquilaab	Anil Raj	
1987	Jawab Hum Denge	D.J.	

=== As director ===
Year	Film	Role	Notes
1988	Shakthi		
1989	Bidisada Bandha		
1991	Kaliyuga Bheema	Rajashekar Gonzales Mohammed Ali	
1991	Bombay Daada	Subhash	
1993	Mahendra Varma	Mahendra Varma	
1994	Mr.Mahesh Kumar	Mr.Mahesh Kumar	
1995	Yama Kinkara		
1997	Arjun Abhimanyu		
1998	Mr.Dear Tiger		
2001	Mysore Huli	Mr Mahendra	Also Composer
2005	Good Bad Ugly		Also Composer
