= A. R. Mitra =

Writer

A. R. Mitra is a writer and researcher from Karnataka India. He writes about Kannada literature and humor writing.

== Early life ==
AkkiHebbalu Ramanaa Mitra Born on February 25, 1935, at Belur in the Hassan district, he had his education in Hassan, Arsikere, Kolar and Mysore. After doing his post-graduate work at Mysore University, Prof. Mitra served as a lecturer at St. Joseph College in Bengaluru and retired as principal of Maharani College. He also served as a Principal in Nehru Smaraka Vidya Kendra College in Jayanagar

== Books and works ==
- Vachankararu Mathu Shabdakalpa
- Naneke Koreyuttene
- Olanotagalu
- Balconiya Bandugalu
- Yaaro Bandiddaru
- Jagattina Pranaya Kathegala Samputa
- Prema Nadiya Dadgalali
- Kumaravyasa Bharatha Kathamitra
