= Vijay (director) =

Indian film director (1936–2020)

- Born: B. Vijaya Reddy; 15 July 1936; Tadepalligudem, West Godavari, Madras Presidency, British India
- Died: 9 October 2020 (aged 84); Chennai, Tamil Nadu, India
- Occupations: Film director, producer and screenwriter

B. Vijaya Reddy (15 July 1936 – 9 October 2020), better known as Vijay Reddy or Vijay, was an Indian film director who worked primarily in Kannada films, besides few Hindi, Tamil, Telugu and Malayalam films. He had directed over 50 films and also produced a few. His debut directorial venture was Rangamahal Rahasya (1970). He was known for his collaborations with leading Kannada actor Rajkumar for movies like Gandhada Gudi (1973), Mayura (1975), Naa Ninna Mareyalare (1976) and Sanaadi Appanna (1977) which are considered among the classic movies of Kannada cinema.

== Early life ==
Reddy was born in Tadepalligudem in the West Godavari district of Madras Presidency in British India to a farming family. He subsequently went to Madras (now Chennai) to look for work.

== Career ==
Reddy started his career in the cinema industry as an assistant editor for B. Vittalacharya's Kannada directorial Mane Tumbida Hennu.

His directorial debut was Rangamahal Rahasya (1970), starring Srinath, the success of which earned him recognition in the industry. It was followed by Modala Rathri (1970) with the same lead actor but the movie was not a commercial success. His third directorial venture, Cow Boy Kulla (1973), with Dwarakish was a reasonable success. His career took a turning point in 1973 when he directed his fourth movie, Gandhada Gudi which was the 150th movie of Rajkumar, who was the leading actor of Kannada films at that time, and the third movie of Vishnuvardhan, who had become a popular actor with the success of his debut movie Naagarahaavu. Gandhada Gudi became a milestone in Kannada films. Vijay's next five movies, Sri Srinivasa Kalyana, Mayura, Naa Ninna Mareyalare, Badavara Bandhu and Sanaadi Appanna, all of which starred Rajkumar were huge commercial successes. He achieved national recognition with the 1977 movie Sanaadi Appanna which had acclaimed shehnai player Bismillah Khan playing the instrument for the lead actor Rajkumar. He directed Rajkumar in nine movies (excluding two cameo appearances) in varied genres including mythological, historical, novel based, folklore and social dramas.

Reddy had the distinction of having directed the 150th movies of both Rajkumar (Gandhada Gudi) and Vishnuvardhan (Mojugara Sogasugara).

He was also instrumental in giving Shankar Nag a mass image through Auto Raja. Prior to that, he had directed Anant Nag in Naa Ninna Bidalaare which had made people take note of Anant's acting prowess. He directed two movies of Shiva Rajkumar - Shiva Mecchida Kannappa and Gandhada Gudi Part 2 both of which had Rajkumar in cameo appearances. He was the director of V. Ravichandran's debut movie Khadeema Kallaru in which he played a negative role.

He had also directed movies in other languages - Hindi, Tamil, Telugu and Malayalam - with the prominent one being the Hindi remake of Naa Ninna Mareyalare titled Pyar Kiya Hai Pyar Karenge starring Anil Kapoor. His other Hindi movies were - Teri Meherbaniyan (remake of Thaliya Bhagya), Jawab Hum Denge (remake of Dharma Pathini), Ganga Tere Desh Mein (remake of Huli Hebbuli) and Paap Ka Ant. His debut Telugu movie was Srimathi.

He also produced two movies - Mullina Gulabi and Kunthi Putra. Vijay floated a production house — Vijaya Shekhar Productions — with another director V. Somashekhar and went on to produce several films. Vijay also directed 17 Hindi and six Telugu films, where he worked with the reigning stars of the time such as Rajesh Khanna, Dharmendra, Shatrughan Sinha and Mithun Chakraborty. He also had 48 Kannada films to his credit. His last directorial was the Vishnuvardhan starrer Karnataka Suputra (1996). In 2000, he was selected to direct Rajkumar's ambitious mythological movie Bhakta Ambareesha which was subsequently shelved.

Recognizing his contribution to Kannada cinema, he was awarded the Puttanna Kanagal Award for 2002-2003.

== Death ==
Reddy died on 9 October 2020 at the Apollo Hospital in Chennai.

== Filmography ==
The following is a list of Kannada movies involving Vijay:

Year	Title	Credited as					Notes
Year	Title	Director	Story writer	Screenplay writer	Producer	Presenter	Notes
1970	Rangamahal Rahasya	Yes	No	No	No	No	Debut
1970	Modala Rathri	Yes	No	No	No	No	
1973	Cow Boy Kulla	Yes	No	No	No	No	
1973	Gandhada Gudi	Yes	No	Yes	No	No	
1974	Sri Srinivasa Kalyana	Yes	No	No	No	No	
1975	Mayura	Yes	No	No	No	No	
1976	Naa Ninna Mareyalare	Yes	No	Yes	No	No	
1976	Badavara Bandhu	Yes	No	No	No	No	
1977	Sanaadi Appanna	Yes	No	No	No	No	
1979	Naa Ninna Bidalaare	Yes	No	No	No	No	
1979	Huliya Haalina Mevu	Yes	No	No	No	No	
1980	Rama Parushurama	Yes	No	No	No	No	
1980	Auto Raja	Yes	No	No	No	No	
1980	Aarada Gaaya	No	No	No	No	Yes	
1981	Hanabalavo Janabalavo	Yes	No	No	No	No	
1981	Nee Nanna Gellalare	Yes	No	No	No	No	
1982	Mullina Gulabi	Yes	No	No	Yes	No	
1982	Khadeema Kallaru	Yes	No	No	No	No	
1982	Chalisada Sagara	Yes	No	No	No	No	
1983	Bhakta Prahlada	Yes	No	No	No	No	
1984	Thaliya Bhagya	Yes	No	No	No	No	
1985	Pavithra Paapi	Yes	No	No	No	No	
1985	Veeradhi Veera	Yes	No	No	No	No	
1985	Thayiya Hone	Yes	No	No	No	No	
1985	Thayi Kanasu	Yes	No	No	No	No	
1985	Mareyada Manikya	Yes	No	No	No	No	
1985	Kiladi Aliya	Yes	No	No	No	No	
1986	Thayiye Nanna Devaru	Yes	No	No	No	No	
1987	Sathva Pareekshe	No	No	No	No	Yes	
1987	Nyayakke Shikshe	No	No	No	No	Yes	
1987	Huli Hebbuli	Yes	No	No	No	No	
1988	Shiva Mecchida Kannappa	Yes	No	No	No	No	
1989	Deva	Yes	No	No	No	No	
1990	Kempu Gulabi	Yes	No	No	No	No	
1992	Kaliyuga Seethe	Yes	No	No	No	No	
1992	Goonda Rajya	Yes	No	No	No	No	
1994	Kunti Putra	Yes	Yes	Yes	Yes	No	
1994	Gandhada Gudi Part 2	Yes	No	Yes	No	No	
1995	Mojugara Sogasugara	Yes	Yes	Yes	No	No	
1996	Karnataka Suputra	Yes	No	No	No	No	
2003	Hrudayanjali	No	No	No	No	Yes	Final film credit
