= Premigala Saval =

- Video cover
- Directed by: V. Somashekhar
- Screenplay by: M. D. Sundar
- Story by: T. Rajendar
- Produced by: M. Rajgopal
- Starring: Tiger Prabhakar; V. Ravichandran; Archana
- Cinematography: R. Chittibabu
- Edited by: Yadav Victor
- Music by: Rajan–Nagendra
- Production company: Fimco
- Release date: 1984
- Running time: 152 minutes
- Country: India
- Language: Kannada

Premigala Saval is a 1984 Indian Kannada-language film directed by V. Somashekhar. The film stars Tiger Prabhakar, V. Ravichandran and Archana. It is a remake of the 1983 Tamil film Uyirullavarai Usha. The soundtrack and score composition was by Rajan–Nagendra and the dialogues and lyrics by Chi. Udaya Shankar.

== Cast ==
- Tiger Prabhakar as Ramanna
- V. Ravichandran as Raja
- Archana as Prema
- Devishree as Seetha
- Vajramuni as Jagdish
- K. Vijaya as Mangala
- Uma Shivakumar as Swarnamma
- Dinesh as College lecturer
- Mukhyamantri Chandru as Gopal Rao
- Sudheer AS Gopal Rao's son in law
- BK Shanka as henchman of Jagadeesh
- V Ashwath Narayan as henchman of Jagadeesh
- Divya
- Baby Vasundhara
- Suryakumar
- Chikkanna
- Circus Boranna
- Shivaprakash
- Tometo Somu

== Soundtrack ==
The music was composed by Rajan–Nagendra, with lyrics by Chi. Udaya Shankar.

Track listing
No.	Title	Lyrics	Singer(s)	Length
1.	"Ninnanda Chendake"	Chi. Udaya Shankar	S. P. Balasubrahmanyam
2.	"Baaninda Jaari"	Chi. Udaya Shankar	S. P. Balasubrahmanyam, S. Janaki
3.	"Thaalalare Ee Daaha"	Chi. Udaya Shankar	S. P. Balasubrahmanyam, S. Janaki
4.	"Abbabba Ethake"	Chi. Udaya Shankar	S. P. Balasubrahmanyam, S. Janaki
5.	"Kanneerinalle Naanu"	Chi. Udaya Shankar	S. P. Balasubrahmanyam, S. Janaki
6.	"Nanna Haage"	Chi. Udaya Shankar	S. P. Balasubrahmanyam
