= Paap Ka Ant =

- Poster
- Directed by: Vijay Reddy
- Produced by: Gautam Bokadia
- Starring: Rajesh Khanna; Hema Malini; Govinda; Madhuri Dixit
- Music by: Bappi Lahiri
- Release date: 8 December 1989
- Country: India
- Language: Hindi

Paap Ka Ant is a 1989 Indian film directed by Vijay Reddy. It stars Govinda, Madhuri Dixit in lead roles, along with Rajesh Khanna, Hema Malini in very very special appearances. The music was composed by Bappi Lahiri.

== Cast ==
- Rajesh Khanna as DCP Khanna
- Hema Malini as Advocate Jyoti
- Govinda as Inspector Arjun
- Madhuri Dixit as Nisha
- Anupam Kher as Minister Prajapati
- Ranjeet as Shakaal
- Mac Mohan
- Viju Khote
- Asrani
- Guddi Maruti
- Dinesh Hingoo as IG

== Plot ==
A woman fights for justice after her fiancé is killed by criminals who are acquitted of his murder and the gangrape of her sister.

== Soundtrack ==
1. "Hum Tum Dance Karenge" – Alka Yagnik, Amit Kumar
2. "Ishq Tere Ne" – Kavita Krishnamurthy, Shabbir Kumar
3. "Koi Vada Koi Iqrar Na Kiya" – Lata Mangeshkar, Mohammed Aziz
4. "Deewane Dil Ke Deewane" – Mohammed Aziz, Kavita Krishnamurthy
5. "Zindagi Ne Kiye" – Mohammed Aziz
