= Shakti Prasad =

Indian actor (1928-1986)

- Born: J. C. Ramaswamy; 19 May 1928; Madhugiri, Kingdom of Mysore, British India
- Died: 2 August 1986 (aged 58); Bangalore, Karnataka, India
- Occupation: Actor
- Years active: 1967–1986
- Spouse: Lakshmi Devi
- Children: 3, including Kishore Sarja and Arjun Sarja
- Relatives: Niveditha Arjun (daughter-in-law); Chiranjeevi Sarja (grandson); Dhruva Sarja (grandson); Aishwarya Arjun (granddaughter)

J. C. Ramaswamy (19 May 1928 – 2 August 1986), known by his screen name Shakti Prasad, was an Indian actor who appeared in Kannada films in mostly negative roles. In a career spanning close to 20 years, he appeared in over 200 films including landmark films such as Immadi Pulikeshi (1967) and Antha (1981).

He is the father of actor Arjun Sarja and director Kishore Sarja, grandfather of actors Chiranjeevi Sarja, Dhruva Sarja and Aishwarya Arjun and father-in-law of former film actress Niveditha Arjun.

== Partial filmography ==
- Immadi Pulikeshi (1967)...Mangalesha
- Jedara Bale (1968)...Jeevan Rao
- Goa Dalli CID 999 (1968)
- Suvarna Bhoomi (1969)...Bhaira
- Boregowda Bangalorige Banda (1970)...Hulikunte Hanuma
- Thayi Devaru (1971)...Rangappa
- Sipayi Ramu (1972)...Shetty
- Bhale Huchcha (1972)
- Kulla Agent 000 (1972)
- Naagarahaavu (1972)...Naidu
- Gandhada Gudi (1973)...Raja (cameo)
- Bangaarada Panjara (1974)
- Mayura (1975)...Narasimhadutta / Jada
- Beluvalada Madilalli (1975)
- Babruvahana (1977)
- Singaporenalli Raja Kulla (1978)...Gopinath Rao
- Kiladi Jodi (1978)
- Hombisilu (1978)...Rangappa
- Thayige Thakka Maga (1978)...Vishwanath
- Madhura Sangama (1978)...Stage actor in a play
- Nanobba Kalla (1979)...Shankarappa
- Huliya Haalina Mevu (1979)...Muthanna
- Bhakta Siriyala (1980)
- Bangarada Jinke (1980)...Bijja
- Ondu Hennu Aaru Kannu (1980)...Prabhakar
- Point Parimala (1980)...John
- Kappu Kola (1980)...Raghu
- Antha (1981)...CID Chief
- Haalu Jenu (1982)...Ugranarasimha
- Sahasa Simha (1982)...Chakravarthy
- Khadeema Kallaru (1982)
- Tony (1982)...Lakshmipathi
- Chakravyuha (1983)...Lakshman Rao
- Eradu Nakshatragalu (1983)
- Geluvu Nannade (1983)...Vasudev
- Samayada Gombe (1984)...Rangappa
- Huliyada Kala (1984)...Shavukar Sundarappa
- Giri Baale (1985)...Kodandaramaiah
- Vajra Mushti (1985)...Dhananjay
- Rasthe Raja (1986)
- Aparadhi Nanalla (1986)...Naresh
