= Khadeema Kallaru =

- Video cover
- Directed by: Vijay
- Screenplay by: M.D. Sundar
- Story by: M.D. Sundar
- Produced by: V. Ravichandran
- Starring: Ambareesh; Prabhakar; Jayamala; Ravichandran
- Cinematography: C. Mahendra
- Edited by: Yadav Victor
- Music by: Shankar–Ganesh
- Production company: Sri Chamundeshwari Studio
- Distributed by: Eswari Pictures
- Release date: 1982
- Country: India
- Language: Kannada

Khadeema Kallaru is a 1982 Indian Kannada film directed by Vijay and produced by V. Ravichandran. The film stars Ambareesh, Prabhakar, Jayamala, Swapna and V. Ravichandran in lead roles. The film is Ravichandran's first film as an adult actor and second as a producer after Prema Matsara.

== Cast ==
- Ambareesh as Raja
- Prabhakar as Ravi
- Jayamala as Usha
- Swapna
- Ravichandran as Johnny
- Kamala Kamesh
- Subhashini
- Shashikala
- Shakti Prasad
- Vajramuni
- Thoogudeepa Srinivas
- Sundar Krishna Urs
