= Naa Ninna Mareyalare =

- Directed by: Vijay
- Written by: Chi. Udayashankar (dialogues)
- Screenplay by: Vijay
- Based on: Naanu Neenu Jodi by A. R. Anand
- Produced by: N. Veeraswamy
- Starring: Rajkumar; Lakshmi; Leelavathi
- Cinematography: Chittibabu
- Edited by: P. Bhaktavatsalam
- Music by: Rajan–Nagendra
- Production company: Sri Eshwari Productions
- Release date: 1976
- Running time: 151 minutes
- Country: India
- Language: Kannada

Naa Ninna Mareyalare ( transl. I Cannot Forget You) is a 1976 Indian Kannada-language film directed by Vijay and produced by N. Veeraswamy. The film is based on the story Naanu Neenu Jodi by A. R. Anand. The film stars Rajkumar and Lakshmi. The Rajan–Nagendra duo scored and composed the film's soundtrack.

The film was remade in Tamil as Puthukavithai starring Rajinikanth and in Hindi by director Vijay as Pyar Kiya Hai Pyar Karenge. The film garnered positive reviews upon release and was a blockbuster at the box office with a theatrical run of 175 days. The film was dubbed in Malayalam in 1981 as Njaan Ninne Marakkilla.

In the run up to the relaunch of Jawa motorbikes in 2018, the marketing team of Mahindra & Mahindra used the climax sequence of this movie as a part of their promotion strategy.

== Plot ==
Usha is the innocent and charming daughter of a bossy and arrogant Annapoorna Devi. She resides with her mother in the latter's coffee estate. Usha has a crush on three times motorcycle road race champion Aanand who works in her uncle's office. With the help of her cousin Pankaja, she manages to get his autograph and have a few pictures clicked with him. Aanand lost his father in a motorcycle accident and his only living close relative is his uncle Subbanna who owns a small tailoring shop in Annapoorna's coffee estate. Usha happens to meet Aanand there. Unbeknownst to her Aanand has already fallen in love with her. Eventually, both of them gain the guts to profess their love for each other after watching a Yakshagana performance organised in the estate. Since Aanand's office is in the city they decide to meet each other on every Saturdays and Sundays.

Annapoorna, meanwhile, fixes Usha's marriage with Mangalore based Mohan Rao's son Vinayak who works as a Flight Lieutenant in the army. Upon returning, she happens to catch Usha with Aanand and pretends to accept their marriage. Afterward, she locks up Usha under heavy guard and with the help of her brother sends Aanand to Bombay for a month on the pretext of some urgent job while preponing the marriage. She insults Subbanna who without knowing the reality approaches her to fix the marriage of Aanand and Usha and ousts him from her estate. Pankaja who is angered by this deception sends Aanand a telegram. However, by the time he reaches the wedding hall after combating various obstacles set by Annapoorna, Usha's marriage ceremony gets over.

Six years pass by and the viewers are now introduced to a now wealthy Subbanna who owns a large garment factory. His loyal servant Kodandi is still with him. Aanand is shown spending quality time with a young girl named Usha. On a rainy night while returning from his office Aanand runs into Usha who now works in a Syndicate Bank. They exchange their family details and Aanand gives her his office address. On the day of Deepavali Usha goes to Aanand's house with sweets for his daughter only to learn that he is still a bachelor and had lied about his family. The little girl, Usha, happens to be his close friend's daughter. She is angered by this and walks out on him. Finding that she has left her handbag behind, Aanand goes to Usha's house only to learn that even she had lied about her family life and that her husband was killed three days after their marriage. They understand how much they love and care for each other. Knowing that the life of a widow is not that easy and comfortable, Aanand asks her hand in marriage. He gives her a day to think over it.

The next day he travels to her house only to find it locked. He receives a letter from her in which she mentions how she wishes not to stain his life. Aanand unsuccessfully meets her at the railway station. Not ready to give up, he follows her and eventually reunites with her.

== Cast ==
- Dr. Rajkumar as Aanand
- Lakshmi as Usha
- Leelavathi as Annapoorna
- Shubha
- Lokanath
- Balakrishna
- Sampath
- Vadiraj as Kolar Kodandi
- Srilalitha as Pankaja
- Baby Saritha as Usha

== Production ==
The movie is based on the novel Naanu Neenu Jodi by A. R. Anand who happens to be the brother of writer A. R. Mitra. The movie was initially titled Ade Veene Ade Raaga. However, the climax was changed to a happy ending in the movie unlike in the novel where the hero fails to meet the heroine at the railway station. Padmapriya was the initial choice for the heroine's role.

== Soundtrack ==
The music of the film was composed by the duo Rajan–Nagendra, with lyrics penned by Chi. Udaya Shankar. The songs met with critical appreciation and were chartbusters, often considered to be one of the finest works of the Rajan–Nagendra duo. The title song was remixed in Kanchana Ganga (2004) starring Shivrajkumar.

Naa Ninna Mareyalare

Soundtrack album to Naa Ninna Mareyalare by Rajan–Nagendra
- Released: 31 December 1976
- Genre: Feature film soundtrack
- Language: Kannada

=== Track list ===
#	Title	Singer(s)
1	"Naa Ninna Mareyalare"	Rajkumar, Vani Jairam
2	"Nannaseya Hoove"	Rajkumar, S. Janaki
3	"Ellelli Nodali"	Rajkumar, S. Janaki
4	"Sihi Muthu Sihi Muthu"	P. B. Sreenivas, S. Janaki

== Jawa Motorcycle Promotion ==
The climax sequence of the film in which Dr. Rajkumar adventurously rides through the hilly region in his Jawa Bike was liked by millions of people. In fact, Jawa became highly popular by then.

A few days before the re-launch of the Jawa motorcycle in 2018 Mahindra Company used these scenes to promote the motorcycle. The company released the teaser on its Twitter account "Jawa Motorcycles" with a description that read, "While we await the epic homecoming of the Jawa on 15/11/18, here's something to set your heart racing. Have fun watching this legendary scene from the film Naa Ninna Mareyalare.".
