= Mayura (film) =

- Poster
- Directed by: Vijay
- Written by: Devudu Narasimha Sastri
- Produced by: T. P. Venugopal
- Starring: Rajkumar; Manjula; K. S. Ashwath; Vajramuni; Srinath
- Cinematography: Annayya; Mallik
- Edited by: Babu; Rajan
- Music by: G. K. Venkatesh
- Distributed by: Ramesh Movies
- Release date: 12 September 1975
- Running time: 178 minutes (136 trimmed version)
- Country: India
- Language: Kannada
- Budget: ₹40-45 lakhs
- Box office: ₹3 crores

Mayura is a 1975 Indian Kannada-language historical drama film, directed by Vijay. It is one of the most popular films of acclaimed Kannada actor Rajkumar, who plays the role of Prince Mayurasharma of the Kadamba dynasty, the earliest native kingdom to rule over what is today the state of Karnataka. The film depicts the life of Mayura, a Brahmin youth, as he discovers his royal heritage and realizes his destiny of ascending to the throne of the then-Pallava kingdom.

Based on a novel of the same name by Devudu Narasimha Sastri, the film is notable for its various scenes filmed inside and around the famous Mysore Palace. The movie was also the last movie to be shot inside the Mysore Palace. The movie saw a theatrical run of 30 weeks. It is considered by many as a symbol of Kannada pride.

The movie was dubbed in Telugu as Mahaveera Mayura and in Malayalam in 1976 as Raja Mayura Varma.

The core plot element of Baahubali – about the hero not knowing his birth secret that he belongs to a royal family and lives in isolation in a village – was reported to be inspired by this movie. V. Vijayendra Prasad, father of S. S. Rajamouli and the story writer of Baahubali: The Beginning had admitted that Dr. Rajkumar films were also one of the responsible factors for the content he derived for that movie.

== Plot ==
The film opens in Kanchi with Mayura, a Brahmin youth challenging an arrogant wrestler and defeating him. Mayura had never been formally trained and had only learned techniques of wrestling by observing other wrestlers. As a Brahmin, he was required to study Vedas, yet he was deeply interested in martial arts and after this wrestling encounter, Ranga Jetti (M. P. Shankar), the premier wrestler in Kanchi, takes him under his wing and trains him. After becoming proficient in all the martial arts, one day, while observing the training of Pallava princes, Mayura accidentally gets into a fight with and gives a thrashing to Vishnugopa (Vajramuni), the Pallava prince, thereby earning his enmity.

After this, Mayura has to flee Kanchi as per the advice of Ranga Jetti, to escape from pursuing Pallavas. He also then learns that he is in fact the son of Raja Chandravarma, the Kadamba king who was killed through deceit by the Pallava king, Sivaskandhavarma. Upon learning from his father's minister about his Kshatriya antecedents and his lineage, Mayura dedicates himself to throw the Pallava yoke and liberate his motherland. Returning to Banavasi in the guise of a merchant called Nilakanthagupta, Mayura builds a following and an army. Through clever strategies, he conquers both Banavasi and the Telugu speaking regions around Srishaila, thus building a vast kingdom.

While the film builds the rivalry between Vishnugopa and Mayura, it also throws light on the mutually admiring friendship between Mayura and the Pallava crown prince (Srinath) and also on the growing love between Mayura and the Pallava princess Premavati (Manjula). In the end, Vishnugopa overcomes his anger and hatred towards Mayura, who marries Premavati, with the blessings of Sivaskandhavarma himself.

== Cast ==
- Dr. Rajkumar as Mayurasharma, a young Brahmin who rises against the Pallava rulers upon being humiliated by one of their kingsmen.
- Srinath as the Yuvaraja of the Pallavas, the Yuvaraja is a wise and far-sighted prince who admires Mayura for his boldness in standing up to his brother Prince Vishnugopa.
- Vajramuni as Prince Vishnugopa, the antagonist of the film, his arrogance and ruthless ambition infuriates Mayura and drives him to rally the populace against his oppression.
- T. N. Balakrishna as Madhukeshwara, an aide to Mayura in his days as an outlaw and vigilante, his loyalties are tested when the authority puts out a reward on any information leading to Mayura's capture.
- Manjula as Premavati
- K. S. Ashwath as Shadananasharma
- M. P. Shankar as Ranga Jetti
- Thoogudeepa Srinivas as Kotwal
- Shakti Prasad as Narasimha datta / Jada
- Sampath as Dantivarma
- Raja Shankar as Veerasharma
- Rajanand as King Shivaskandavarman
- Tiger Prabhakar as Cheluva, a wrestler
- H. R. Shastry as Eeshabhatta, Mayurasharma's foster father
- Joker Shyam as Parameshwara

== Production ==
Assistant director of the movie Bangalore Nagesh had revealed that Manjula had walked out of the sets without shooting the climax due to non-settlement of her remuneration - after which the shoot was completed using a junior artist without revealing the face of the character.

== Soundtrack ==
Mayura

Soundtrack album by G. K. Venkatesh
- Released: August 1975
- Genre: Feature film soundtrack
- Label: Saregama

The soundtrack of Mayura consists of four tracks, all composed by G. K. Venkatesh, with its lyrics written by Chi. Udayashankar and sung by P. B. Sreenivas, Rajkumar and S. Janaki.

| Track # | Song | Singer(s) |
|---|---|---|
| 1 | Naaniruvude Nimagaagi | Rajkumar |
| 2 | Ee Mounava Taalenu | Rajkumar, S. Janaki |
| 3 | Hagalo Irulo | S. Janaki |
| 4 | Kelo manganna | P. B. Sreenivas |

== Legacy ==
Mayuravarma is the earliest known native ruler to rule over areas which now form Karnataka. Before the rise of the Kadambas, the centers of power ruling the land were outside of the Karnataka region. But with the Kadambas' ascent to power, Kannada language and culture was brought into the mainstream and attained the status of majority, due to which Mayuravarma's reign, and his depiction in the film, is regarded with pride by present-day Kannadigas.

== See also ==
- List of Asian historical drama films
