= Aparadhi Nanalla =

2026 Indian Kannada language film

- Release poster
- Directed by: Yashanth Kalladka
- Written by: Yashanth Kalladka
- Produced by: Ajith Choura Devasya
- Starring: Arjun Kapikad; Pramod Shetty; Amrutha Murthy
- Cinematography: Y B R Manu
- Edited by: Raju Aryan
- Music by: Shinoy–Sandeep
- Production company: SLV Colours Anugraha Films
- Release date: 3 July 2026
- Running time: 125 minutes
- Country: India
- Language: Kannada

Aparadhi Nanalla is a 2026 Indian Kannada language film directed by Yashanth Kalladka. The film stars Arjun Kapikad, Pramod Shetty, and Amrutha Murthy in the lead role.

== Cast ==
- Arjun Kapikad
- Pramod Shetty
- Amrutha Murthy
- Dinesh Mangalore
- Naveen D. Padil
- Jyothi Rao
- Neetha Shetty
- Srusha Samani
- Anup Sagar
- Arjun Kajje

== Reception ==
Susmita Sameera of The Times of India said that "The performances are adequate across the cast, while the technical aspects remain average. Although the film presents an interesting premise and develops it with greater depth in the latter half, the uneven screenplay limits its overall impact. Those who enjoy investigative crime dramas with a measured pace may still find enough in its subject matter to give it a watch." A. Sharadhaa of the Cinema Express said that "Aparadhi Nanalla doesn't reinvent the courtroom drama, nor does it capture the excitement of a gripping investigative thriller. The film takes its time to reach this insight, and the uneven first half tests your patience. But once it begins to look beyond the crime and focus on the people affected by it, it reveals a sincerity that's hard to overlook." Maheswara Reddy of the Bangalore Mirror said that "Arjun Dev has acted well. Amrutha Murthy looks beautiful. Naveen D Padil is at his best. His dialogue delivery and gestures deserve appreciation. Dinesh Mangaluru is convincing as an underworld don. Pramod, known for playing police inspectors in movies, played the investigation officer of the murder case with ease."
