= Moogana Sedu =

- Directed by: B. Subba Rao
- Screenplay by: M. D. Sundar
- Story by: M. D. Sundar
- Produced by: A. L. Abbayi Naidu
- Starring: Shankar Nag; Manjula; Sampath; Udaykumar
- Cinematography: P. Devaraj; R. Chetti Babu
- Edited by: P. Bhaktavatsalam
- Music by: Satyam
- Production companies: Premier Studio; Chamundeshwari Studios
- Release date: 1980
- Country: India
- Language: Kannada

Moogana Sedu is a 1980 Indian Kannada-language film directed by B. Subba Rao and produced by A. L. Abbayi Naidu. The film stars Shankar Nag and Manjula. it showcased Shankar Nag's acting capabilities through his performance as a mute man. The film was remade in Telugu as Moogavani Paga.

== Cast ==
- Shankar Nag as Nagaraju/Ashok Raj
- Manjula as Mangala
- Sampath
- Udaykumar as Papanna
- T. N. Balakrishna
- Sundar Krishna Urs as Narsing
- Shankar Rao
- Prabhakar as Robert
- Advani Lakshmi Devi
- K. V. Jaya

== Soundtrack ==
The music for the film was composed by Satyam, with lyrics penned by Chi. Udaya Shankar.

Moogana Sedu

Soundtrack album to Moogana Sedu by Satyam
- Released: 1980
- Language: Kannada

=== Track list ===
#	Title	Singer(s)
1	"Jaadisi Odi"	S. P. Balasubrahmanyam
2	"Bangaradha Bombeye"	S. P. Balasubrahmanyam, S. Janaki
3	"Nimagirali Naadu"	S. P. Balasubrahmanyam
4	"Abbo Entha"	S. Janaki
