= Rajanand =

Indian actor

- Born: Venkataraju; 2 December 1927; Haranhalli, Arsikere, Hassan, Karnataka
- Died: 26 August 2004 (aged 77); Mysore, India
- Occupations: Film actor; drama/theater artist; drama script writer
- Spouse: Vimalamma
- Children: 3

Venkataraju, known by his professional name Rajanand (1927–2004), was an Indian actor in the Kannada film industry. Some of his notable films include Operation Diamond Racket (1978), Mayura (1975), and Eradu Kanasu (1974).

== Career ==
Rajanand contributed to more than 318 Kannada films as an actor, and he directed 350 drama/theater plays. He wrote thousands of Vachanas and around 3,000 poems and 9,000 Kavanas. Rajanand completed a 480 feet length dialogue in one take in his debut film Dhana Pishachi (1967).

Rajanand started the Ranga Vaibhava theatre group in 1965.

== Personal life ==
Rajanand actively participated in theatre/drama plays at the age of 10 and received training from drama groups like Kalkoti, Samaja Vikasana, Kamala Kala, and from drama artists Sorat Ashwath, Master Hirannaiah, Yoganarasimha and A. S. Seshachar. Rajanand worked in drama companies like Gubbi Veeranna drama company, and Master Hirannaiah's drama company. He was named 'Rajanand' (meaning: King pleasure), during his time in Gubbi Veeranna drama company. He was married to Vimalamma (1942–2021). They had a son, Ravichandra. The family resided in Mysore.

== Selected filmography ==
- Dhana Pishachi (1967)
- Chakra Theertha (1967)
- Mayor Muthanna (1969)...Madhu
- Rangamahal Rahasya (1970)
- Mayura (1975)...King Shivaskandavarma
- Bahaddur Gandu (1976)
- Bhagyavantharu (1977)
- Thayige Thakka Maga (1978)
- Putani Agent 123 (1979)
- Nanobba Kalla (1979)...Rajan
- Huliya Haalina Mevu (1979)...Chikka Virarajendra
- Bhakta Siriyala (1980)
- Guru Shishyaru (1981)...Rajaguru Poornanandaiah
- Bhaari Bharjari Bete (1981)...Chowdappa Nayaka
- Ranganayaki (1981)
- Tony (1982)...Joseph
- Bhaktha Prahlada (1983)
- Dharani Mandala Madhyadolage (1983)...Ramappa Dalavayi
- Raktha Thilaka (1984)
- Dhruva Thare (1985)...Vishwanatha Rai
- Karna (1986)
- Jeevana Jyothi (1987 film) (1987)...Ranganna
- Ranadheera (1988)
- Devatha Manushya (1988)...Kapanipathi
- Deva (1989)
- Hongkongnalli Agent Amar (1989)
- Chaitrada Premanjali (1992)...Manjayya
- Mysore Jaana (1992)...Hulikatte Ramappa
- Halunda Tavaru (1994)
- Kunthi Puthra (1994)
- Mojugara Sogasugara (1995)
- Bangarada Kalasha (1995)
- Doni Sagali (1998)...Deepti's father

== Award ==
- Dr. Vishnuvardhan Award (Lifetime Contribution to Kannada Cinema Award) (2001–02)

== See also ==
- Cinema of Karnataka
- List of Indian film actors
- Cinema of India
