= M. P. Shankar =

Indian actor

- Born: 20 August 1935; Mysore, Kingdom of Mysore
- Died: 17 July 2008 (aged 72); Mysore, Karnataka
- Occupations: Actor; filmmaker
- Spouse: Manjula
- Children: 3

Mysore Puttalingappa Shankar (20 August 1935 – 17 July 2008) was an Indian actor and filmmaker in Kannada cinema. He acted in films like Satya Harishchandra as 'Veera Baahu', Naagarahaavu as 'Pailwan Basanna', Bhootayyana Maga Ayyu as Bhootayya, Ratnamanjari etc. He produced the film Gandhada Gudi starring Dr. Rajkumar in which Shankar acted as forest department driver Johnny. He died on 17 July 2008 in Mysore. His contribution to Kannada cinema was recognised by the Government of Karnataka by awarding him the Rajyotsava Prashasti in 2002.

== Early life ==
Shankar was the third son of Puttalingappa and Gangamma. His father ran a handloom textile industry. Shankar had his primary and secondary education in Dalvoy School and higher secondary education in Banumaiah's High School. His family got into financial crisis due to losses at textile industry. He could not even appear for SSLC exams because of financial problems. He worked as a daily wager in the then Mysore Electricity Board.

== Career ==
Shankar started his career as a foundry man in the railway workshop at Mysore in 1955 on a monthly wage of Rs. 80. This iron grinding work affected his body. Shankar, who practised wrestling, participated in the Dasara wrestling competition in 1956 and received title from the then Chief Minister B. D. Jatti. He dreamt of winning the "Sri Mysore" wrestling title. But the wrestling competition was suspended for three years from 1957, following the violence which broke out during the competition that year. His acting talent came to light when he played the role of Kadu Kuruba in the diamond jubilee celebration of Banumaiah's Institutions and received a prize from Sri Jayachamaraja Wadiyar.

He formed a drama troupe under the banner Bharani Kalavidaru and enacted plays such as Gadayuddha, Yechchama Nayaka, Yelahanka Bhoopala and Raja Gopichand throughout the State.

M. P. Shankar made his entry into films in 1962 as a villain in the film Ratnamanjari, directed by Hunsur Krishnamurthy and made a name for himself in the cine industry. He earned the distinction of acting in 108 films. Shankar acted as a villain in films such as Veera Sankalpa, Kadina Rahasya, Naari Munidare Maari, Gandhada Gudi, Rama Lakshmana and Bhootayyana Maga Ayyu .

Shankar started his own production unit in 1968 under the banner "Bharani Chitra". He began creating awareness about environment and wildlife through his films like Kaadina Rahasya, Gandhada Gudi, Rama Lakshmana, Mrugalaya.

== Partial filmography ==
Year	Film	Role	Notes
1962	Rathna Manjari		Debut film
1964	Mane Aliya	Nagesh	
1965	Satya Harishchandra	Veerabahu	
1965	Bettada Huli		
1967	Parvathi Kalyana	Tarakasura	
1967	Gange Gowri	Shani Deva	
1967	Manassiddare Marga	Prakash	
1968	Jedara Bale	Gopinath Kumar's associate	
1968	Mannina Maga	Byra	
1968	Chinnari Puttanna		
1969	Kadina Rahasya	Kaala	Also producer
1969	Mayor Muthanna	Rajappa	
1969	Gandondu Hennaru	Kodanda	
1971	Nyayave Devaru		
1972	Bangaarada Manushya	Honnaiah	
1972	Naagarahaavu	Pailwan Basanna	
1973	Gandhada Gudi	Johnny	Also producer
1974	Bhootayyana Maga Ayyu	Bhootayya	
1975	Mayura	Rangajetti	
1978	Kiladi Jodi		
1979	Huliya Haalina Mevu	Dodda Veerarappa	
1980	Narada Vijaya	Gurupada	
1980	Maria My Darling	Maria's father	
1981	Bhaari Bharjari Bete	Bartender	
1983	Onde Guri		Also producer
1984	Naane Raja	Police Commissioner	Also producer
1985	Kaadina Raja		Also producer
1985	Vajra Mushti	Police Commissioner Chandrashekhar	
1986	Mrugaalaya		Also producer
1986	Na Ninna Preetisuve	Lakshmipathi	
1988	Vijaya Khadga	Sardar Gopinath	
1988	Vijaya Khadga		Also producer
1989	Avane Nanna Ganda	Mullukatte Parandhamaiah	
1990	Kempu Surya		
1991	Gandu Sidigundu		
1991	Gowri Kalyana		
1991	Halli Rambhe Belli Bombe		Also producer
1994	Gandhada Gudi Part 2		
1995	Tungabhadra		
1995	Giddu Dada		Also producer
2003	Katthegalu Saar Katthegalu		
2003	Smile	Sharma	
2003	Nanjundi		
2006	Belli Betta	Nagegowda	
2006	Kallarali Hoovagi	Dodda Madakari Nayaka	
2007	Anatharu	Undertaker	

== Death ==
He died on 17 July 2008 after a prolonged illness at his residence Manjunatha Nilaya in Vijayanagar in Mysore city. He is survived by his wife Manjula, son Tilak and daughter Shobha. The last rites were held with full state honours in Mysore on 18 July.
