= Rajan–Nagendra =

Indian music composing duo

- Rajan–Nagendra brothers
- Born: Rajan; Nagendrappa; 1933 (Rajan); 1935 (Nagendra); Mysore, Mysore State, British India
- Died: October 11, 2020 (aged 87) (Rajan); November 4, 2000 (aged 65) (Nagendra)
- Occupation: Music composers
- Years active: 1952–1999

Rajan–Nagendra were Indian brothers and musical duo who were prominent composers of film music in Kannada and Telugu cinema from the late 1950s to the early 1990s. The two brothers created a niche for themselves for nearly four decades. The duo scored music for about 375 films, over 200 of them in Kannada and the remainder in other languages like Telugu, Tamil, Malayalam, Tulu, Hindi and Sinhala. They composed innumerable hits, hundreds of melodious tunes in their career spanning four decades. They also hold the record for being the longest active musical pair in the industry.

== Childhood ==
Rajan (1933–2020) and Nagendrappa (1935–2000) were born in Shivarampet of Mysore in a middle-class musical family. Their father Rajappa was a harmonium and flute player who played background music for silent movies.

Within a short time, each of them attained proficiency in playing a different instrument – Rajan in violin and Nagendra in Jal tarang. Rajan used to listen to musical performances of eminent musicians at Choudayya Ramamandira in Mysore and hence got the opportunity to listen to music performances by Hindusthani, Karnatak, and western music in the Mysore palace. Later on, Rajan came to Bangalore for his further educational studies.

== Early career ==
In Bangalore, Rajan studied in S.L.N. School in the K.R. Market area and later in Central High School. Rajan learnt the violin and appeared at the state level violin competition, where he secured the first place.

Both Rajan and Nagendra participated in public performances through Jaya Maruthi Orchestra. Meanwhile, Rajan got an offer to go to Madras. He took his brother along with him and they got an opportunity to learn the music trade under the aegis of H. R. Padmanabha Shastri, who was known for producing talkie movies at that time. This gave them significant exposure to the movie industry.

In 1951, Nagendra returned to Mysore and completed his matriculation. Then he joined P. Kalinga Rao, who was then a famous radio artiste. Within no time, Nagendra got an opportunity to sing for the movie 'Srinivasa Kalyana' along with Hindustani singer Ameer Bai.

Finally, Rajan–Nagendra became independent music directors when they scored music for the film Sowbhagya Lakshmi in 1952. This movie opened the doors of success, and they never looked back for more than four decades. After 'Sowbhagya Lakshmi' came Vittalacharya's 'Chanchalakumari', 'Rajalakshmi' and 'Mutthaide Bhagya' in a series to pave the way for these would-be melody kings.

== Composers ==
Rajan used to compose the melodies and set the notations for the orchestra. Nagendra used to dictate the lyrics and tune of the song to the singers.

They had a successful stint in Kannada film industry from early 50s till late 90s, but they started shining from 1973 with Gandhada Gudi songs becoming popular throughout Karnataka and dimmed in early 90s, when new generation music took over thus covering a span of two decades of lilting melodies that has been hugely popular to date in Karnataka and other states of South India.

In the 70s came super hits in a row like Nyayave Devaru, Gandhada Gudi, Devara Gudi, Bhagyavantaru, Eradu Kanasu, Naa Ninna Mareyalare, Naa Ninna Bidalaare, Hombisilu, Bayalu Daari, Pavana Ganga, Giri Kanye and others.

In the 80s, they made the music for some Telugu films, including Maa Intayana Katha, Puli Bebbuli and Vayyari Bhamalu Vagalamari Bharathulu. They composed the music for about 70 Telugu films.

Further, they kept scoring consistently good music through the 90s and in the course, produced for movies like Mathe Haditu Kogile, Marali Goodige and Suprabhaata. They also composed music for a TV serial 'Abhimaana' on Udaya TV.

Rajan–Nagendra made songs in the Rajkumar-Lakshmi Naa Ninna Mareyalaare and Eradu Kanasu, which starred Rajkumar, Manjula and Kalpana.

Hombisilu, starring Vishnuvardhan, was another big hit.

Rajan–Nagendra also did a series of films starring Anant Nag, and Lakshmi, notable among them being Naa Ninna Bidalaare, Benkiya Bale and Chandanada Gombe.

Naa Ninna Mareyalaare, Gandhada Gudi, Eradu Kanasu—these musical hits of the Kannada screen featured the music of Rajan–Nagendra. The duo was known for composing cheerful love duets, but they also composed two sombre numbers such as Baadi hoda balliyinda (P. B. Srinivas, Eradu Kanasu).

The lyricists who wrote unforgettable lyrics for them are Hunsur Krishnamurthy, Chi. Udayashankar, Vijaya Naarasimha, Geethapriya, Doddarangegowda, M. N. Vyasa Rao and many more. The prominent Telugu lyricists are Narayana Reddy, Dasarathi and late Vetoori Sundarama Murthy and many others. The most prominent Tamil lyricists are late Kanna Dasan and many more.

Rajan–Nagendra's songs were sung by legendary singers P. B. Srinivas, S. Janaki, Dr. Rajkumar, SPB. Almost all of them remain etched as the melodies of Kannada Cinema. The duo is also reported to have introduced another illustrious playback singer, K. S. Chitra to the Kannada cinema back in the early 1980s.

The main male vocalists who enriched the melody of their songs are Ghantasala, Kala Govindarajan, P. B. Srinivas, Dr. Rajkumar, Kishore Kumar, S. P. Balasubrahmanyam, K. J. Yesudas, P. Jayachandran, Rajesh Krishnan and many more. The popular female vocalists are Bala Saraswati, Soolamangalam sisters, P. Leela, S. Janaki, Vani Jairam, Rani, L. R. Eswari, P. Susheela, Jikki, K. S. Chitra and many more.

Nagendra sang a couple of songs in his five-decade-long career. The most popular was Yaaru yaaru née yaaru for the comedian Narasimharaju. He also sang Nammoora santheli in the Jai Jagadish-Lakshmi starrer Gaali Maathu and Neeliya baninda tareya oorinda from Tony. Somehow his voice was typecast for comic scenes.

The pair directed music for about 400 films, more than 200 in Kannada alone and rest in Telugu, Tamil, Malayalam, Tulu, and Sinhalese.

Most of the hit songs from Kannada movies were remade in Telugu.

Tribute Concert and Felicitation to Rajan in 2018 in Hyderabad:

6 decades of Rajan- Nagendra's Cine music glory and full-fledged concert was organized by Vamsee International along with singer Sarada Akunuri USA in Hyderabad on March 1, 2018. Golden era director Rajan was felicitated with Ghantasala gold medal and music concert. Sri Rajan graced the event along with his son Ananth Rajan. At the age of 85, it was amazing to see Sri Rajan to sit and listen so intently for almost 4 hours.

== Composition ==
Some unforgettable Rajan–Nagendra numbers:

=== Kannada ===
- Akashave beelali mele from Nyayave Devaru
- Aakaasha deepavu neenu from Pavana Ganga
- Aakaashadinda dharegilida from Chandanada Gombe
- Aaseya bhaava olavina jeeva from Mangalya Bhagya
- Aalaya Mrugalaya from Mrugalaya
- Aralutide moha from Nanobba Kalla
- Baanallu neene bhuviyallu neene from Bayalu Dari
- Bandeya baalina belakaagi from Avala Hejje
- Bisiladarenu Maleyadarenu from Benkiya bale
- Beladinglondu hennagi bandanthe kande from Premanubandha
- Beluvalda madilalli bevara hani biddaga from Beluvaladha Madilalli
- Cheluveya andada mogake from Devara Gudi
- Dundu mallige mathaadeya from Nanna Devaru
- Ee bhaavageete ninagaagi haadide from Onde Guri
- Ellelli Nodali Ninnane Kanuve from Na ninna mareyalare
- Endendu ninnanu maretu from Eradu Kanasu
- E Hrudaya Haadige from Suprabhata
- Gopilola hey gopala from Nari munidare maari
- Halliyadarenu shiva dilliyadarenu shiva from Mayor Muttanna
- Hosa balige née joteyade from Naa ninna bidalare
- Indu enage govinda from Eradu Kanasu
- Jeeva veene from Hombisilu
- Kanasalu neene manasalu neene from Bayalu Dari
- Kangalu vandane helide from Mugiyada Kathe
- Kumkumaviruvude hanegaagi from Naaniruvude Ninaagaagi
- Mamaravello Kogileyello from Devara Gudi
- Manasu manasu ondadare from Preethi madu Tamasha nodu
- Maneyanu Belagide Indu from Chandanada Gombe
- Mathu chenna mauna chenna from Rama Lakshmana
- Modalane dinave olide from Pavana Ganga
- Muthina hanigalu from Bayasade Banda Bhagya
- Na haadalu neevu aadabeku from Kalla Kulla
- Naa ninna mareyalaare from Naa ninna mareyalaare
- Naliva gulabi hoove from Auto Raja
- Nanna haadu nannadu from Suprabhata
- Nanu neenu ondada mele from Na ninna bidalare
- Navaduva Nudiye Kannada Nudi from Gandhadha Gudi
- Neera bittu nelada mele from Hombisilu
- Neralanu Kanada lateyante from Avala Hejje
- Ninna Nanna Manavu from Bhagyavantharu
- Ninna Snehake from Bhagyavantharu
- Notadage nageya meeti from Parasangada Genda Timma
- Omme ninnannu kann tumba from Gaali matu
- Prema preethi nannusiru from Singapoorinalli Raja Kulla
- Tam nam tam nam nannee manasu midiyutide from Eradu Kanasu
- Tarikere yeri mele mooru kari kuri mari from Devara Duddu
- Tera eri ambaradage from Parasangada Genda Timma
- Thareyu baanige thaavare neerige from Biligiriya Banadali
- Thai thai thai thai bangari from Giri Kanye
- Yuga yugagale saagali from Hrudaya Geethe

=== Telugu ===
- Emo emo idhi (Aggi pidigu)
- Ennenno Janmalabandham (Puja)
- Ningi nela (Puja)
- Pujaluseya (Puja)
- Mallelu poose Vennela kaase (Intinti Ramayanam)
- Veena venuvaina sarigama (Intinti Ramayanam)
- Intinti Ramayanam (Intinti Ramayanam)
- Chinukula raali (Nalugu Sthambhalaata)
- Manasa veena madhugeetam (Panthulamma)
- Sirimalleneeva (Panthulamma)
- Letha chaligalulu (Moodu mullu)
- Neekosam yavvanamantha (Moodu mullu)
- Neekallalo Snehamu (Prema Khaidi)
- Aakaasam Nee Haddu Ra (Sommokadidhi Sokokadidhi)
- Nagamalli Vo Teega Malli Vo (Nagamalli)
- Kastandhuko (Rendu Rellu Aaru)
- Viraha Veena (Rendu Rellu Aaru)
- Parimalinchu Punnamilo (Puli Bebbuli)

== Awards and recognition ==
Rajan–Nagendra can be considered as in the same class as Hindi cinema's composing duo Shankar-Jaikishen, Laxmikanth Pyarelal and Kalyanji-Anandji. They excelled composing violin-rich orchestral interludes and enjoyed an equally long innings in the industry.

Their first award film in Kannada was

- Eradu Kanasu in 1973–74 – State Award for Best Music Director
- Parasangada Gendethimma in 1978–79 – State Award for Best Music Director
- He won Nandi Award for Best Music Director - "Panthulamma" (1979)

== Deaths ==
Nagendra, the younger one of the duo, died of a stroke in Bowring & Lady Curzon Hospitals, Bangalore, on 4 November 2000. He was being treated for hernia but later developed complications from high blood pressure and diabetes.

Rajan died on 11 October 2020 due to a cardiac arrest at his home in Bengaluru. He was also suffering from other age-related ailments.

== Later activity ==
Rajan continued his work along with his son R. Ananth Kumar. He published a book titled "Haado Suswara Sangeetha" regarding an innovative notation system for music enthusiasts. They were also conducting music classes by name "Sapthaswaranjali" for vocal enthusiasts on voice culturing and film singing.

== Discography ==
=== Kannada ===
Year	Film title	Remarks
1952	Sowbhagya Lakshmi	
1953	Chanchala Kumari	Debut film as music director
1954	Kanyaa Daana	
1954	Rajalakshmi	
1956	Muthaide Bhagya	
1958	Maangalya Yoga	
1958	Mane Thumbida Hennu	
1959	Manege Banda Mahalakshmi	
1961	Nagarjuna	
1962	Rathna Manjari	
1964	Mangala Muhurta	
1964	Annapoorna	
1964	Navajeevana	
1964	Veera Sankalpa	
1965	Paathala Mohini	
1966	Eendu Ninnavane	
1966	Mantralaya Mahatme	
1966	Sri Kanyaka Parameshwari Kathe	
1967	Sathi Sukanya	
1967	Anuradha	
1967	Bangarada Hoovu	
1967	Devara Gedda Manava	
1968	Adda Dari	
1968	Pravasi Mandira	
1969	Mayor Muthanna	
1970	Aaparaajithe	
1970	Boregowda Bangalorige Banda	
1970	Kanneeru	
1970	Muru Muttugalu	
1971	Anugraha	
1971	Nyayave Devaru	
1971	Onde Kula Onde Daiva	
1972	Bhale Huchcha	
1972	Kulla Agent 000	Kishore Kumar sang for this movie
1972	Naari Munidare Maari	
1972	Vishakanye	
1973	Beesida Bale	
1973	Cowboy Kulla	
1973	Dharmapatni	
1973	Gandhada Gudi	
1973	Swayamvara	
1974	Eradu Kanasu	Karnataka State Film Award for Best Music Director
1974	Mahaa Thyaga	
1974	Prema Paasha	
1974	Professor Huchuraya	
1974	Sri Srinivasa Kalyana	
1975	Beluvalada Madilaali	
1975	Devara Gudi	
1975	Kalla Kulla	
1975	Mantra Shakthi	
1976	Bayalu Daari	
1976	Maangalya Bhagya	
1976	Mugiyada Kathe	
1976	Naa Ninna Mareyalare	
1976	Vijaya Vaani	
1977	Bayasade Banda Bhagya	
1977	Bhagyavantharu	
1977	Devara Duddu	
1977	Pavana Ganga	
1977	Taayiginta Devarilla	
1978	Hombisilu	
1978	Kiladi Jodi	
1978	Kittu Puttu	
1978	Madhura Sangama	
1978	Parasangada Gendethimma	Karnataka State Film Award for Best Music Director
1978	Phoenix	
1978	Singapuralli Raja Kulla	
1979	Chandanada Gombe	
1979	Maralu Sarapani	
1979	Naa Ninna Bidalaare	
1979	Naaniruvude Ninaagaagi	
1979	Nanobba Kalla	
1979	Preethi Maadu Tamashe Nodu	
1979	Putani Agent 123	
1980	Auto Raja	
1980	Biligiriya Banadalli	
1980	Kulla Kulli	
1980	Manku Thimma	
1980	Point Parimala	
1980	Rama Lakshmana	
1980	Rama-Parashurama	
1981	Avala Hejje	
1981	Chadurida Chitragulu	
1981	Gaali Maathu	
1981	Jeevakke Jeeva	
1981	Koodi Baalidare Swarga Sukha	
1981	Muniyana Maadari	
1981	Prema Pallavi	
1981	Premaanubandha	
1981	Yava Hoovu Yara Mudigo	
1982	Chalisuva Modagalu	
1982	Archana	
1982	Bettale Seve	
1982	Nanna Devaru	
1982	Paraajitha	
1982	Tony	
1983	Benkiya Bale	
1983	Gayathri Maduve	
1983	Ibbani Karagithu	
1983	Jaggu	
1983	Onde Guri	
1983	Prema Parva	
1984	Prema Saakshi	
1984	Kalinga Sarpa	
1984	Marali Goodige	
1984	Maryade Mahalu	
1984	Mooru Janma	
1984	Olavu Moodidaga	
1984	Onde Raktha	
1984	Preethi Vatsalya	
1984	Premigala Saval	
1984	Yarivanu	
1985	Bettada Hoovu	
1985	Bidugadeya Bedi	
1985	Giribaale	
1985	Jeevana Chakra	
1985	Kaadina Raja	
1985	Sedina Hakki	
1985	Shabdagalu	
1986	Guri	
1986	Mattondu Charithre	
1986	Mrugaalaya	
1986	Prema Gange	
1986	Seelu Nakshatra	
1986	Usha	
1986	Vishwa Roopa	
1987	Aapadbaandava	
1987	Inspector Kranti Kumar	
1987	Karunamayi	
1988	Arjun	
1988	Dharmathma	
1988	Jananayaka	
1988	Nammoora Raja	
1988	Sambhavaami Yuge Yuge	
1988	Suprabhatha	
1989	Doctor Krishna	
1989	Gagana	
1989	Hrudaya Geethe	
1990	Baare Nanna Muddina Raani	
1990	Chapala Chennigaraya	
1990	Ganeshana Maduve	
1990	Kempu Surya	
1990	Mathe Haditu Kogile	
1990	Shivashankar	
1991	Gandanige Takka Hendathi	
1991	Gauri Ganesha	
1991	Jagadeka Veera	
1991	Mangalya	
1991	Modada Mareyali	
1991	Nagu Naguta Nali	
1992	Aathma Bandhana	
1992	Hatamari Hennu Kiladi Gandu	
1992	Kaliyuga Seethe	
1992	Mysore Jaana	
1992	Halli Krishna Delhi Radha	
1992	Nanna Shatru	
1992	Ondu Cinema Kathe	
1992	Prema Sangama	
1992	Shivanaga	
1993	Bahaddoor Hennu	
1993	Huvondu Beku Ballige	
1993	Jaga Mechida Huduga	
1993	Jeevana Sangharsha	
1993	Naanendu Nimmavane	
1993	Suryodaya	
1993	Urvashi Kalyana	
1994	Bhutaayi Makkalu	
1994	Gandhada Gudi Part 2	
1994	Poorna Satya	
1994	Yaarigu Haelbedi	
1995	Bangaarada Kalasa	
1995	Ganeshana Galate	
1995	Giddu Dada	
1995	Karulina Kudi	
1995	State Rowdy	
1995	Yama Kinkara	
1996	Bangarada Mane	
1996	Baalina Jyothi	
1996	Suryaputra	
1997	Choo Bhaana	
1997	Janani Janmabhoomi	
1998	Arjun Abhimanyu	
1998	Bayalu Deepa	
1998	Hrudayanjali	
1998	Jagat Kilaadi	
1999	Prema Prema Prema	

=== Telugu ===
Year	Film title	Remarks
1959	Pelli Meedha Pelli	
1960	Kanaka Durga Pooja Mahima	
1960	Anna Chellelu	
1962	Khaidhi Kannayya	
1962	Madhana Kaamaraju Katha	
1964	Aggi Pidugu	
1964	Navagraha Pooja Mahima	
1971	Varalakshmi Vratam	
1975	Pooja (1975 film)	
1977	Panthulamma	
1978	Sommokadidi Sokokadidi	
1979	Intinti Ramayanam	
1980	Allari Baava	
1980	Nagamalli	
1980	Thathayya Premaleelalu	
1981	Maa Pelli Katha	
1981	Pranaya Geetham	
1982	Manchu Pallaki	
1982	Vayyari Bhaamalu Vagalamaari Bharthalu	
1982	Naalugu Stambhalata	
1982	Maa Intaina Katha	
1983	Kotikkodau	
1983	Moodu Mullu	
1983	Puli Bebbuli	
1983	Lanke Bindelu	
1984	Raju Raani Jockey	
1985	Anuraga Bandham	
1986	Rendu Rella Aaru	
1986	Aadapaduchu	
1987	Raaga Leela	
1988	Choopulu Kalisina Subhavela	
1991	Prema Khaidi	
1991	Appula Appa Rao	

=== Tamil ===
- Ellorum Vazhavendum (1962)
- Veettukku Veedu Vasappadi (1979)

=== Malayalam ===
- Kaattu Rani (1985)
- Lady Teacher (1982)

== See also ==
- Cinema of Karnataka
