= List of Kannada films of 1981 =

== Top-grossing films ==
Rank	Title	Collection	Ref.
1.	Antha	₹3 crore (₹68.05 crore in 2025)	
2.	Geetha	₹2.5 crore (₹56.7 crore in 2025)	
3.	Ranganayaki	₹2 crore (₹45.36 crore in 2025)	
4.	Nee Nanna Gellalare	₹1 crore (₹22.68 crore in 2025)	
5.	Gharjane	₹50 lakh (₹11.34 crore in 2025)	

== List ==
The following is a list of films produced in the Kannada film industry in India in 1981, presented in alphabetical order.

Title	Director	Cast	Music
Aalemane	Mohan Kumar	Suresh Heblikar, Seetharam, Roopa Chakravarthi	Ashwath-Vaidi
Antha	Rajendra Singh Babu	Ambareesh, Lakshmi, Leelavathi, Vajramuni	G. K. Venkatesh
Anupama	Renuka Sharma	Ananth Nag, Madhavi, M. S. Umesh	Ashwath-Vaidi
Avala Hejje	H. R. Bhargava	Vishnuvardhan, Ambareesh, Lakshmi, Dwarakish	Rajan–Nagendra
Avali Javali	A. V. Seshagiri Rao	Srinath, Lokesh, Manjula, Lokanath	Satyam
Baalu Bangara	Geethapriya	Ashok, Srinivasa Murthy, Srilalitha, Maanu	Vijaya Bhaskar
Bangarada Mane	Basavaraj Kesthur	Srinath, Ashok, Roja Ramani	Vijaya Bhaskar
Bhagyada Belaku	K. V. S. Kutumba Rao	Aarathi, Maanu, Jayamala, Dheerendra Gopal	Jayaprakash
Bhagyavantha	B. S. Ranga	Master Lohith, Aarathi, Jai Jagadish, Leelavathi, K. S. Ashwath	T. G. Lingappa
Bhaari Bharjari Bete	Rajendra Singh Babu	Ambareesh, Shankar Nag, Jayamala, Prabhakar	Ilaiyaraaja
Bhoomige Banda Bhagavantha	K. S. L. Swamy	Lokesh, Jai Jagadish, Lakshmi, Vajramuni, Roja Ramani	G. K. Venkatesh
Chadurida Chitragalu	N. T. Jayarama Reddy	Rajesh, Aarathi, Balakrishna	Rajan–Nagendra
Devara Aata	V. Somashekhar	Shankar Nag, Sulakshana, M. P. Shankar, Leelavathi	Satyam
Ediyooru Siddalingeshwara	Hunsur Krishnamurthy	Lokesh, Aarathi, K. S. Ashwath, Jai Jagadish	T. G. Lingappa
Etu Ediretu	Mani Murugan	Srinath, Lakshmi, K. S. Ashwath	Satyam
Gaali Maathu	Dorai-Bhagavan	Lakshmi, Kokila Mohan, Jai Jagadish, Hema Chowdhary, K. S. Ashwath	Rajan–Nagendra
Ganeshana Mahime	Mani Murugan	Ashok, Aarathi, Sundar Krishna Urs, Musuri Krishnamurthy	M. S. Viswanathan
Garjane	C. V. Rajendran	Rajinikanth, Madhavi, Geetha, Jai Jagadish, Dwarakish	Ilaiyaraaja
Geetha	Shankar Nag	Shankar Nag, Akshata Rao, Ramesh Bhat, K. S. Ashwath	Ilaiyaraaja
Grahana	T. S. Nagabharana	Anand Paricharan, Malathi Rao, Mallika Isaak, G. K. Govinda Rao	Vijaya Bhaskar
Guru Shishyaru	H. R. Bhargava	Vishnuvardhan, Manjula, Jayamalini, Dwarakish, Balakrishna, Dinesh, M. S. Umesh, Shivaram	K. V. Mahadevan
Havina Hede	V. Somashekhar	Rajkumar, Sulakshana, Dinesh	G. K. Venkatesh
Hennina Sedu	Sameeulla	Kokila Mohan, Geetha, Srinath	Ramesh Naidu
Jeevakke Jeeva	K. S. R. Das	Shankar Nag, Ananth Nag, Saritha, Dwarakish	Rajan–Nagendra
Keralida Simha	Chi. Dattaraj	Rajkumar, Saritha, Srinivasa Murthy	Satyam
Koodi Baalidare Swargasukha	Siddalingaiah	Srinivasa Murthy, Rajyalakshmi, Loknath	Rajan–Nagendra
Kula Puthra	T. R. Ramanna	Shankar Nag, Gayathri, Dwarakish, Udaykumar	Satyam
Leader Vishwanath	Mani Murugan	Ambareesh, Jayanthi, K. S. Ashwath, Leelavathi	Vijaya Bhaskar
Maha Prachandaru	Joe Simon	Vishnuvardhan, Ambareesh, Kumari Vinaya, Halam, Tiger Prabhakar	Upendra Kumar
Mane Mane Kathe	Rajachand	Vishnuvardhan, Dwarakish, Jayachitra, Lokesh, Deepa	Satyam
Mareyada Haadu	R. N. Jayagopal	Ananth Nag, Manjula, Leelavathi	G. K. Venkatesh
Muniyana Madari	Dorai-Bhagavan	Shankar Nag, Jayamala, Kokila Mohan	Rajan–Nagendra
Naga Kala Bhairava	Tiptur Raghu	Vishnuvardhan, Jayanthi, Jayamala, Dheerendra Gopal	M. Ranga Rao
Nee Nanna Gellalare	Vijay	Rajkumar, Manjula, Balakrishna, K. S. Ashwath	Ilaiyaraaja
Prachanda Putanigalu	Geethapriya	Ramakrishna Hegde, Bhanuprakash, Baby Indira, Dwarakish, Srilalitha	Upendra Kumar
Preethisi Nodu	Geethapriya	Vishnuvardhan, Aarathi, Srinivasa Murthy	Vijaya Bhaskar
Premanubhandha	R. Ramamurthy	Srinath, Manjula, Manorama, K. Vijaya	Rajan–Nagendra
Ranganayaki	Puttanna Kanagal	Ambareesh, Aarathi, Ramakrishna, Ashok	M. Ranga Rao
Sangeetha	Chandrashekhara Kambara	Lokesh, Jayamala, Maanu, Pramila Joshai	Chandrashekhara Kambara
Shikari	C. R. Simha	Srinath, Manjula, Leelavathi, Vajramuni	Ilayaraja
Simhada Mari Sainya	Rajendra Singh Babu	Arjun Sarja, Baby Rekha, Bhanuprakash, Jayanthi	Satyam
Snehitara Savaal	K. S. R. Das	Ambareesh, Vishnuvardhan, Manjula, K. S. Ashwath, Tiger Prabhakar	Satyam
Sri Raghavendra Vaibhava	Babu Krishnamurthy	Srinath, Chandrakala, Ramanamurthy	Chittibabu
Swapna	Dasari Narayana Rao	Swapna	Satyam
Thayiya Madilalli	B. Subba Rao	Ashok, Aarathi, Balakrishna, Leelavathi	Satyam

== See also ==
- Kannada films of 1980
- Kannada films of 1982
