= List of Kannada films of 1974 =

== Top-grossing films ==
Rank	Title	Collection	Ref.
1.	Sampathige Savaal	₹2.75 crore (₹83 crore in 2025)	
2.	Bhootayyana Maga Ayyu	₹2.5 crore (₹78.7 crore in 2025)	
3.	Sri Srinivasa Kalyana	₹2 crore (₹63 crore in 2025)	
4.	Bangaarada Panjara	₹1 crore (₹31.5 crore in 2025)	
5.	Bhakta Kumbara	₹75 lakh (₹23.72 crore in 2025)	

== Released films ==
The following is a list of films produced in the Kannada film industry in India in 1974, presented in alphabetical order.

Title	Director	Cast	Music
Anna Attige	M. R. Vittal	Vishnuvardhan, K. S. Ashwath, Pandari Bai, Bharathi, Dwarakish, Balakrishna	G. K. Venkatesh
Baaluve Ninagagi	L. Sathya	Vijayaraj, Srilalitha, Agni, Umarani	K. H. Narayana Swamy
Bangaarada Panjara	V. Somashekhar	Rajkumar, Aarathi, Balakrishna, K. S. Ashwath	G. K. Raghu
Bettada Bhairava	M. N. Srinivas	Udayakumar, Udaya Chandrika, T. N. Balakrishna, Varalakshmi	P. L. Sriramulu
Bhakta Kumbara	Hunsur Krishnamurthy	Rajkumar, Manjula, Leelavathi, Dwarakish	G. K. Venkatesh
Bhale Bhatta	Kanagal Prabhakar Sastry	Aarathi, Usharani, Sarasamba, Musuri Krishnamurthy, Shringar Nagaraj	M. Ranga Rao
Bhootayyana Maga Ayyu	Siddalingaiah	Vishnuvardhan, Lokesh, L. V. Sharadha, Bhavani	G. K. Venkatesh
Chamundeshwari Mahime	Addala Narayana Rao	Srinath, Latha, B. Saroja Devi, Udaya Kumar	S. Hanumantha
Eradu Kanasu	Dorai-Bhagavan	Rajkumar, Kalpana, Manjula, K. S. Ashwath	Rajan–Nagendra
Gruhini	Vijaya Sathyam	B. Saroja Devi, Rajesh, Ramgopal, Dwarakish	M. Ranga Rao
Hemareddy Mallamma	T. V. Singh Tagore, Rajan	K. S. Ashwath, Pandari Bai, V. Nagayya, Shylashri	R. S. Diwakar
Maadi Madidavaru	K. M. Shankarappa	Ramgopal, Girija Lokesh, Sudheer, Enagi Balappa	Bhaskar Chandavarkar
Maga Mommaga	Y. R. Swamy	Dwarakish, Vajramuni, Chandrakala	M. Ranga Rao
Mahaa Tyaga	Maruthi	Leelavathi, Aarathi, M. Jayashree	Rajan–Nagendra
Mahadiya Mane	C. V. Shivashankar	Udaya Kumar, Leelavathi, Shubha	R. Rathna
Mannina Magalu	B. S. Ranga	Gangadhar, Aarathi, R. Nagendra Rao	S. Rajeswara Rao
Nanoo Balabeku	K. S. Satyanarayana	Udaya Kumar, Srinath, Balakrishna, Aarathi, Surekha	R. Rathna
Prema Pasha	Aroor Pattabhi	Udaya Kumar, Dikki Madhava Rao, Leelavathi, TMR Bharathish	Rajan-Nagendra
Professor Huchuraya	M. R. Vittal	Narasimharaju, Balakrishna, Vishnuvardhan, Manjula, Leelavathi, Dwarakish	Rajan–Nagendra
Sampathige Savaal	A. V. Sheshagiri Rao	Rajkumar, Manjula, Vajramuni, Balakrishna	G. K. Venkatesh
Sri Srinivasa Kalyana	Vijay	Rajkumar, B. Saroja Devi, Manjula, Raja Shankar	Rajan–Nagendra
Upasane	Puttanna Kanagal	Aarathi, Seetharam, Leelavathi, Sharada	Vijaya Bhaskar
Urvashi	Tiptur Raghu	Rajesh, Shakti Prasad, T. N. Balakrishna, Sandhya	R. Rathna
Veeranjaneya Kathe	Janaki Ram	Kanta Rao, S. V. Ranga Rao, Anjali, Vasanthi	Satyam

== Dr. Rajkumar Movies ==
Sampathige Savaal

Eradu Kanasu (1974 film)

Bangaarada Panjara

Bhakta Kumbara

Sri Srinivasa Kalyana

== See also ==
- Kannada films of 1973
- Kannada films of 1975
