= Udupi Jayaram =

Udupi B Jayaram
- Born: 28 November 1929; Balekudru, South Canara, Madras Presidency, British India (in present-day Udupi, Karnataka, India)
- Died: 13 October 2004 (aged 74); Chennai, India
- Occupation: Choreographer
- Spouse: Saroja (m. 1954)
- Children: 4

Udupi B Jayaram (28 November 1929 – 13 October 2004) was an Indian choreographer known for his work in Kannada cinema. He choreographed in dance sequences for over 500 films which included Kannada, Tamil, Telugu, Malayalam and Tulu films.

== Career ==
Jayaram was born on 28 November 1929 in Balekudru, a village in the erstwhile South Canara region of Madras Presidency in British India (in present-day Udupi district of India's Karnataka State), to Ananda Bhat and Jalajamma. Alongside music, he learnt most forms of Indian classical dances as a child which included Bharatanatyam, Kathakali, Kathak, Manipuri, Kuchipudi and Bhangra. He was a classmate of seer Vishwesha Tirtha.

Aged 17, he left for Madras (now Chennai) and got his first appointment on the sets of the Tamil-language film, Chandralekha (1948), where he worked as a bandmaster. As a choreographer, he made his debut in Kannada films with Bedara Kannappa (1954), in which he worked as an assistant; the film was actor Rajkumar's first in a lead role. He became an independent choreographer in 1956 with Bhagyodaya which was the debut movie of Udaykumar. He went on to choreograph dance sequences for popular Tamil actors such as Sivaji Ganesan and M. G. Ramachandran in Karnan (1964) and Naalai Namadhe (1975) respectively. Rajkumar's last film Shabdavedhi was one of the last movies he worked on.

== Filmography ==
- Bedara Kannappa (1954)
- Makkala Rajya (1960)
- Kittur Chennamma (1961)
- Naandi (1964)
- Karnan (1964)
- Bangaarada Manushya (1972)
- Cow Boy Kulla (1973)
- Naalai Namadhe (1975)
- Kalla Kulla (1975)
- Baduku Bangaravayithu (1976)
- Premada Kanike (1976)
- Sanaadi Appanna (1977)
- Babruvahana (1977)
- Giri Kanye (1977)
- Sose Tanda Soubhagya (1977)
- Putani Agent 123 (1979)
- Preethi Madu Thamashe Nodu (1979)...also cameo
- Bhoomige Banda Bhagavantha (1981)
- Geetha (1981)
- Kaviratna Kalidasa (1983)
- Chandi Chamundi (1983)
- Nodi Swamy Navirodu Heege (1983)
- Malaya Marutha (1986)
- Muthina Haara (1990)
- Jeevana Chaitra (1992)
- Aakasmika (1993)
- Odahuttidavaru (1994)
- Thayavva (1997)
- Bhoomi Thayiya Chochchala Maga (1998)
- Shabdavedhi (2000)
