= Thayigintha Devarilla =

- Directed by: Y. R. Swamy
- Written by: K. S. R. Murthy
- Screenplay by: M. D. Sundar
- Produced by: Lakshmi Vajramuni
- Starring: Srinath; Jayanthi; Manjula; Lokanath
- Cinematography: S. S. Lal
- Edited by: P. Bhakthavathsalam
- Music by: Rajan–Nagendra
- Production company: Vajrameshwara Pictures
- Distributed by: Vajrameshwara Pictures
- Release date: 20 September 1977
- Country: India
- Language: Kannada

Thayigintha Devarilla is a 1977 Indian Kannada-language film, directed by Y. R. Swamy and produced by Lakshmi Vajramuni. The film stars Srinath, Jayanthi, Manjula and Lokanath. The film has musical score by Rajan–Nagendra.

== Cast ==
- Jayanthi as Vasantha
- Srinath as Hari (Guest)
- Manjula
- Lokanath
- Jayakumar
- Seetharam
- Joker Shyam
- B. S. Narayana Rao
- Bhadrachalam
- Bhatti Mahadevappa
- B. Hanumanthachar
- Vajramuni as Sundar
- N. S. Rao
- Balachandra Pai
- B. H. Manohar
- Siddalingappa
- Kunigal Ramanath
- S. K. Ramu
- Halasingachar
- Raghavendra Raju
- B. Jayashree
- Pramila Joshai
- Shanthamma
- Vani Chandra
- Prameela
- Udayashree
- Baby Rekha

== Soundtrack ==
The music was composed by Rajan–Nagendra.

No.	Song	Singers	Lyrics	Length (m:ss)
1	"Amma Endare Manavella"	S. Janaki	Chi. Udaya Shankar	03:22
2	"Maduveyaago Henne"	S. Janaki	Chi. Udaya Shankar	03:20
3	"Nee Thanda Bhaagya"	S. Janaki, S. P. Balasubrahmanyam	Chi. Udaya Shankar	03:22
