= Manjina There =

- Directed by: Bangalore Nagesh
- Written by: Chi. Udaya Shankar (dialogues)
- Screenplay by: M. D. Sundar; Bangalore Nagesh
- Story by: Sahyadri
- Produced by: K. R. Narayana Murthy
- Starring: Srinath; Manjula; Thoogudeepa Srinivas; Dinesh
- Cinematography: R. Madhusudan
- Edited by: B. S. Prakash Rao
- Music by: Upendra Kumar
- Production company: G K Productions
- Distributed by: G K Productions
- Release date: 19 April 1980
- Running time: 133 min
- Country: India
- Language: Kannada

Manjina There is a 1980 Indian Kannada film, directed by Bangalore Nagesh and produced by K. R. Narayana Murthy. The film stars Srinath, Manjula, Thoogudeepa Srinivas and Dinesh in the lead roles. The film has musical score by Upendra Kumar.

== Cast ==
- Srinath
- Manjula
- Thoogudeepa Srinivas
- Dinesh
- Shakti Prasad
- Chethan Ramrao
- Narasimharaju
- Sampath
- Vajramuni
- Shashikala
- Mamatha Shenoy
- Saroja
- Rajakumari
- Vathsala
- Raghunath
- Thipatur Siddaramaiah

== Soundtrack ==
The music was composed by Upendra Kumar.

No.	Song	Singers	Lyrics	Length (m:ss)
1	"Noduve Ideke"	S. Janaki	Chi. Udaya Shankar	03:26
2	"O Nanna Cheluve"	K. J. Yesudas	Chi. Udaya Shankar	02:53
3	"Balasiruva"	K. J. Yesudas, Vani Jairam	Chi. Udaya Shankar	03:04
4	"Joke"	S. Janaki	Chi. Udaya Shankar	03:07
