= Preethi Madu Thamashe Nodu =

1979 film by C. V. Rajendran

- DVD cover
- Directed by: C. V. Rajendran
- Written by: Chi. Udaya Shankar (dialogues)
- Screenplay by: M. D. Sundar
- Story by: C. V. Sridhar; Chitralaya Gopu
- Based on: Kadhalikka Neramillai (Tamil)(1964) by C. V. Sridhar
- Produced by: Dwarakish
- Starring: Srinath; Shankar Nag; Dwarakish; Manjula; Padmapriya
- Cinematography: V. K. Kannan
- Edited by: Yadav Victor
- Music by: Rajan–Nagendra
- Production company: Dwarakish Chitra
- Release date: 23 August 1979
- Running time: 145 min
- Country: India
- Language: Kannada

Preethi Madu Thamashe Nodu ( transl. Fall in Love and Watch the Fun) is a 1979 Indian Kannada-language romantic comedy film, directed by C. V. Rajendran and produced by Dwarakish. The film stars Srinath, Shankar Nag, Dwarakish and Manjula and Padmapriya. It is a remake of the 1964 Tamil romantic-comedy film Kadhalikka Neramillai.

== Cast ==
- Srinath as Sripathi/Chidambara Swamy
- Shankar Nag as Ravi
- Dwarakish as Sundara, aspiring filmmaker
- Manjula as Madhavi
- Padmapriya as Padmini
- Balakrishna as Hanumantha Rao
- Narasimharaju as Nataraja
- Thoogudeepa Srinivas as Harish
- Musuri Krishnamurthy as Muniya
- Pramila Joshai as Maayi
- Uma Shivakumar as Bhagya
- Shanthala
- Rani
- B. Hanumanthachar
- Nagaraj
- Bheema Rao
- Shivaji Rao
- Kunigal Ramanath
- Comedian Guggu as Chenna
- Manmatha Rao
- Kannada Raju
- Ashwath Narayan
- Tiger Prabhakar in a cameo
- Shakti Prasad in a cameo
- Udupi Jayaram as choreographer (uncredited cameo)

== Soundtrack ==
The music was composed by Rajan–Nagendra, with lyrics by Chi. Udaya Shankar.

Song	Singers	Length
"Ninna Kanda Nanna"	S. P. Balasubrahmanyam, S. Janaki	04:40
"Preethi Maadu Tamasshe Nodu"	S. P. Balasubrahmanyam, S. Janaki	04:40
"Manasu Manasu"	S. P. Balasubrahmanyam, S. Janaki	04:32
"Nammooru Mysooru"	S. P. Balasubrahmanyam, S. Janaki	04:46
