= Hasyaratna Ramakrishna =

- Directed by: B. S. Ranga
- Screenplay by: B. S. Ranga
- Story by: B. S. Ranga
- Produced by: B. R. Vasanth; A. Ramesh Rao
- Starring: Anant Nag; Aarathi; Manjula; Sripriya
- Cinematography: B. N. Haridas
- Edited by: P. G. Mohan
- Music by: T. G. Lingappa
- Production company: Varna Productions
- Distributed by: Varna Productions
- Release date: 1982
- Running time: 140 minutes
- Country: India
- Language: Kannada

Hasyaratna Ramakrishna is a 1982 Indian Kannada language comedy film directed by B. S. Ranga. The film stars Anant Nag in the role of a poet, Ramakrishna. It also features Aarathi, Manjula, Sripriya and Srinath in the pivotal roles. The film was a remake of director's own Telugu film Tenali Ramakrishna (1956) which was based on the story of Tenali Rama.

== Cast ==
- Anant Nag as Ramakrishna
- Aarathi as Kamala
- Srinath as Krishnadevaraya
- Manjula
- Sripriya as Krishnasani
- Pramila Joshai
- K. S. Ashwath
- Shivaram
- Dinesh
- Mandeep Roy

== Soundtrack ==
Hasyaratna Ramakrishna

Soundtrack album by T. G. Lingappa
- Released: 1982
- Genre: Feature film soundtrack
- Length: 32:15
- Label: Saregama

T. G. Lingappa composed the soundtrack, and lyrics were written by Chi. Udaya Shankar. The album consists of eight soundtracks.

Track listing
No.	Title	Lyrics	Singer(s)	Length
1.	"Anjaneya Swami Banda"	Chi. Udaya Shankar	S. P. Balasubrahmanyam	4:27
2.	"Chikkavanene Ivanu"	Chi. Udaya Shankar	Vani Jairam, K. J. Yesudas	5:17
3.	"Iddhu Hogu"	Chi. Udaya Shankar	K. J. Yesudas, S. Janaki	4:01
4.	"Krishna Karedaaga"	Chi. Udaya Shankar	S. Janaki	4:06
5.	"Mellage Kai Kotthu"	Chi. Udaya Shankar	S. Janaki	4:03
6.	"Nanu Neenu Iniya"	Chi. Udaya Shankar	S. Janaki	4:01
7.	"Enu Chenna"	Chi. Udaya Shankar	S. Janaki	2:50
8.	"Bhoomiya Thanditta"	Chi. Udaya Shankar	P. B. Sreenivas	3:30
Total length:				32:15
