= Savathiya Neralu =

- Directed by: Y. R. Swamy
- Produced by: S. Suresh
- Starring: Srinath; Manjula; Ambareesh; Leelavathi
- Cinematography: R. Madhu
- Music by: Satyam
- Release date: 1979
- Country: India
- Language: Kannada

Savathiya Neralu ( transl. Co-wife's shadow) is a 1979 Indian Kannada film, directed by Y. R. Swamy and produced by S. Suresh. The film stars Srinath, Manjula, Ambareesh and Leelavathi in the lead roles. It is adapted from Aryamba Pattabhi's novel of the same name which was based on Daphne du Maurier's cult classic Rebecca. The film has musical score by Satyam.

== Cast ==
- Srinath as Harsha
- Manjula as Padmini
- Ambareesh
- Leelavathi as Janakamma
- K.Vijaya
- N.S. Rao as Cheluvaraya
- Sharapanjara Srinivasa Ayyangar as Kabinipathi Raya
- Chindodi Leela
- Mamatha Shenoy
- Chandrika
- Chandrashekhar
- Mohan
- Shantharam
- Narayana Rao Pole
