= Madhura Sangama =

- Directed by: T. P. Venugopal
- Written by: M Narendra Babu (dialogues)
- Screenplay by: T. P. Venugopal
- Story by: T. P. Venugopal
- Produced by: V. Vijay Chander; V. Ramesh Chander
- Starring: Anant Nag; Ashok; Radha Saluja; K. S. Ashwath
- Cinematography: M. A. Rehman; Annayya; Mallik
- Edited by: Balu
- Music by: Rajan–Nagendra
- Production company: DVR Movies
- Release date: December 1978
- Running time: 127 minutes
- Country: India
- Language: Kannada

Madhura Sangama is a 1978 Indian Kannada-language film directed by T. P. Venugopal, starring Anant Nag, Radha Saluja and Ashok. The film features a musical score by Rajan–Nagendra. It is considered one of the early multi-starrers of Kannada cinema. The film also includes extended cameo appearances by a galaxy of stars in the Kumara Rama ballet.

== Plot ==
The film opens with wealthy estate owner Srikanthaiah discovering that his daughter Sharada is in love with Gopal, an estate supervisor employed under him. Disapproving of the relationship due to differences in social status, he arranges her marriage to another man. However, Sharada elopes with Gopal and marries him. Though heartbroken by the separation from his only child, Srikanthaiah gradually regrets his actions and begins searching for the couple, hoping to reconcile with them. He eventually reunites with Sharada and accepts both her and Gopal. Soon after, Sharada becomes pregnant with twins. Tragedy strikes when she dies during childbirth, while Gopal is killed in an accident while rushing to procure medicine for her.

The orphaned twin daughters are taken in by Gopal's neighbours, who name them Mala and Kala. Owing to financial hardship, they decide to raise one child while placing the other in an orphanage. Kala, who is physically challenged, grows up in the orphanage frequently supported by donations from Srikanthaiah. During a cultural programme, her talent impresses him, leading to the discovery that she is his granddaughter. Overjoyed, Srikanthaiah brings her home and raises her with affection. However, his sister resents Kala's presence, fearing that her own son Vasu will lose his claim over Srikanthaiah's wealth and estate. As the years pass, Mala grows up separately and falls in love with Vikram, a young man from an affluent family, while Kala develops feelings for Dr. Prasanna, a foreign-returned physician who often visits the household to treat Srikanthaiah.

Srikanthaiah happily approves of Kala and Prasanna's relationship, further angering his sister and Vasu. Matters take an unexpected turn when Vasu encounters Mala and is stunned by her resemblance to Kala. Realising that the twins are identical, he devises a scheme to manipulate Srikanthaiah's inheritance by using Mala to impersonate Kala. Circumstances soon create confusion between the sisters when Kala leaves to perform in a stage production based on the life of Kumara Rama, while Mala occupies her place at the estate.

Taking advantage of the situation, Vasu and his accomplice plot to eliminate both Kala and Srikanthaiah to secure the estate. Mistaking Mala for Kala, Vasu attempts to kill her, but his plans unravel when Mala reveals her identity and resists him. Simultaneously, an attempt on Srikanthaiah's life is foiled with the help of Dr. Prasanna. The conspirators are handed over to the police. The arrival of Mala's foster parents finally reveals the truth about the separated twins, leaving Srikanthaiah overjoyed at discovering that he has not one, but two granddaughters. The reunion of the long-separated family gives meaning to the title Madhura Sangama ("Happy Union").

== Cast ==
- Anant Nag as Dr. Prasanna
- Ashok as Vikram
- Dwarakish as Compounder Kapanipathy
- K. S. Ashwath as Srikanthaiah
- Vajramuni as Vasu
- Radha Saluja as Mala / Kala
- T. N. Balakrishna as Mala's foster father
- Manjula as Sharada
- Uma Shivakumar as Jalaja, Srikanthaiah's sister
- Dinesh as Vasu's friend
- M. S. Sathya as college student who eve-teases Mala
- Rajanand as Dr. Prasanna's patient
- Anantharam Maccheri
- Leelavathi as Vikram's mother
- Advani Lakshmi Devi as Lakshmi, Mala's foster mother
- Chindodi Leela
- Thipatur Siddaramaiah
- Prabhakar
- Kunigal Ramanath as Ramanathaiah
- Srinath in a cameo as Gopal

Actors in play

- Vishnuvardhan as Kumara Rama
- Udaykumar as Kampili Raya
- Bharathi Vishnuvardhan as Lalithambe
- Master Hirannaiah
- Padmapriya as Kampili Raya's wife
- M. N. Lakshmi Devi as Sangayi
- Shakti Prasad
- Roopa

== Soundtrack ==
Madhura Sangama

Soundtrack album by Rajan–Nagendra
- Released: 1978
- Genre: Feature film soundtrack
- Label: Saregama

The film score and soundtrack was composed by Rajan–Nagendra. The soundtrack album consists of four tracks. S. Janaki sang in a child's voice for the song "Thaayiya Thandeya".

No.	Title	Lyrics	Singer(s)	Length
1.	"Endendigoo"	R. N. Jayagopal	S. P. Balasubrahmanyam, Vani Jairam
2.	"Thaayiya Thandeya"	Kangal Prabhakara Sastry	S. Janaki
3.	"Hadinarara Hare Bandaga"	R. N. Jayagopal	S. P. Balasubrahmanyam, S. Janaki
4.	"Youvana Kala"		S. P. Balasubrahmanyam, S. Janaki
