= Galate Samsara =

- VCD cover
- Directed by: C. V. Rajendran
- Screenplay by: C. V. Rajendran
- Story by: Chitralaya Gopu
- Based on: Veettuku Veedu (Tamil)(1970)
- Produced by: C. Jayaram
- Starring: Dr.Vishnuvardhan; Manjula; Rajinikanth; Halam
- Cinematography: S. V. Srikanth
- Edited by: P. Bhakthavathsalam
- Music by: G. K. Venkatesh
- Release date: 2 December 1977
- Running time: 145 minutes
- Country: India
- Language: Kannada

Galate Samsara ( transl. Chaotic family) is a 1977 Indian Kannada language comedy film directed by C. V. Rajendran and produced by C. Jayaram. It stars Dr.Vishnuvardhan, Manjula and Rajinikanth in the lead roles. It also stars Dwarakish, Dr. K S Ashwath, Balakrishna and Vajramuni in supporting roles. The movie is a remake of Tamil movie Veettuku Veedu, which was based on the play Thikku Theriyatha Veettil which in turn was an adaptation of the English comedy play Right Bed Wrong Husband.

== Plot ==
Vasudevan (Dr.Vishnuvardhan) is the son of a rich businessman, Kadikalingam. Vasu is fearful of his father, because Kadikalingam is a very strict man. He works at his father's company as the General Manager and is in love with a young bold woman Malathy. However, Kadikalingam strictly opposes this love, so Vasu leaves his home and registers for marriage to Malathy. The couple become tenants in Kala's house. Kala is Malathy's close friend and her husband is Balu (Rajinikanth). He has a close relationship with another woman Prameela, who is a stage dancer. Kala feels unhappy about her married life. Balu has been avoiding Kala lately since his infidelity with Prameela. Balu is also physically abusive towards his wife. Malathy warns Balu to stay away from Prameela and to be sincere to his wife. Balu signs the divorce papers and leaves his wife and starts staying at his girlfriend's house.

Meanwhile, Balu's paternal uncle died in an accident and had named him as the next of kin in his will. They intend to lay their hands on 2 lakhs cash. In a moment of crisis, Malathy is forced to make her husband Vasu pose as Kala's husband Balu. Pattusamy is manager Paramanandham's son, who works as a music teacher. Pattusamy and Paramanandham come to Kala's house and spend a week with her at her home. Pattusamy falls in love with Malathy. He tries to impress her. Pattusamy is always standing in front of Malathy's room watching her.

Prameela finds a richer businessman than Balu and kicks him out. Balu who sees Vasu and Kala's photo published in a newspaper for a soap company advertisement, goes home and argues with Vasu and Malathy. Then Malathy briefly explains the house's situation. Balu claims to hear the truth and also joins the drama.

Next day, Balu introduces himself to Paramanandham as Ramesh, Malathy's brother from Sri Lanka. Pattusamy closely watches the house and the peoples' activities because he thinks there is something fishy with the members of the house. He tells his suspicion to his father, but Paramandham does not believe his son. Unfortunately, Kadigalingam reaches Vasu's rented house and calls Kala back to her home. Then, Kala and Malathy explain the truth and Kadikalingam understood Malathy is his daughter-in-law and not the mistress of Vasu. Pattusamy and his father hear the news. They are explained the crisis situation and then Paramandham gives the cash into Kala and Balu's hands. Finally Malathy succeeds in her plan and Pattusamy was asked to apologize to Malathy.

== Cast ==
- Vishnuvardhan as Vasudev Rao
- Manjula as Janaki
- Rajinikanth as Sundar
- Shubha as Kaveri
- Halam
- Lavanya
- Baby Rekha as Prameela
- T. N. Balakrishna as Mahadevayya
- Dwarakish as Muthanna
- K. S. Ashwath as Gubbi Ganesh Rao
- Vajramuni
- Joker Shyam
- G. R. Bheema Rao
- M. Shivaji Rao
- Sharapanjara Iyengar
- Kunigal Ramanath

== Soundtrack ==
Soundtrack was composed by G. K. Venkatesh.

- Koollige Hallila - SP Balasubramaniam
- Yeneno Keluthire - S. Janaki
- Bayasidare - S. Janaki
- Naale Naa - SPB
