= Bete (1986 film) =

1986 Kannada film by V. Somashekar

- Directed by: V. Somashekar
- Written by: V. Somasekhar; Somu; Shanmugha Sundaram; N. K. Keerthi Raj
- Produced by: V. Somashekar
- Starring: Ambareesh; Ambika; Anuradha; Umashree; T. N. Balakrishna; Vajramuni; Mukhyamantri Chandru
- Cinematography: H. G. Raju
- Edited by: Victor Yadav
- Music by: S. P. B.
- Production company: Vajragiri Films
- Release date: 1986
- Running time: 132 minutes
- Country: India
- Language: Kannada

Bete is a 1986 Indian Kannada action film produced and directed by V. Somashekar for Vajragiri Films who also co-wrote the screenplay along with Somu and Shanmugha Sundaram. The story was by N. K. Keerthi Raj with cinematography handled by H. G. Raju and editing done by Victor-Yadav duo. It stars Ambareesh, Ambika, Anuradha, Umashree, T. N. Balakrishna, Vajramuni and Mukhyamantri Chandru in the major roles. The film received a U/A Certificate from the Bangalore regional office of the censor board, the certificate dated 6/11/1986 with 9 cuts.

== Cast ==
- Ambareesh
- Ambika
- Anuradha
- Umashree
- T. N. Balakrishna
- Vajramuni
- Mukhyamantri Chandru
- Dheerendra Gopal
- C. R. Simha
- Sudheer
- N. S. Rao
- Thimmaraya
- Lohithaswa

=== Guest appearance ===
- Srinath
- Thoogudeepa Srinivas
- Jai Jagadish
- Manu
- Suma
- Thara

== Soundtrack ==
S. P. B. scored and composed the film's soundtrack with lyrics penned by R. N. Jayagopal.

- Shlokam by S. P. B.
- Chaliya Naduke by S. P. B., S. Janaki
- Chintisune Manave by S. P. B.
- Bete Bete by S. P. B.
- Anda Chandadali by S. Janaki
- Hathu Yenthu by S. P. Sailaja, Uma Ramanan
- Abbabba Yentha by S. Janaki
