= Haddina Kannu =

- Directed by: A. V. Seshagiri Rao
- Screenplay by: Anjaneya Pushpanand
- Story by: L. S. Iyer
- Produced by: P. Krishna Raj
- Starring: Shankar Nag; Manjula; Lokesh; Srinath
- Cinematography: V. K. Kannan
- Edited by: Yadav Victor
- Music by: Satyam
- Production company: Mohan Murali Productions
- Release date: 1980
- Running time: 143 min.
- Country: India
- Language: Kannada

Haddina Kannu is a 1980 Indian Kannada-language film directed by A. V. Seshagiri Rao and produced by P. Krishna Raj. The film stars Shankar Nag, Srinath, Lokesh and Manjula. The film was scripted and presented by L. S. Iyer.

== Cast ==
- Shankar Nag as Vikram
- Manjula as Benne Bhagya
- Srinath as Vinod
- Lokesh as Rudra
- Dwarakish as Dose Damodara
- Sundar Krishna Urs as Prathap
- Musuri Krishnamurthy as Constable Kariyanna
- Tiger Prabhakar
- Jayamalini
- Vajramuni as Bhadrappa
- K. S. Ashwath as Dharmappa
- Jyothi Lakshmi
- Pramila Joshai as Chenni
- M. Jayashree

== Soundtrack ==
The music of the film was composed by Satyam with lyrics penned by Chi. Udaya Shankar.

Haddina Kannu

Soundtrack album to Haddina Kannu by Satyam
- Released: 1980
- Language: Kannada

=== Track list ===
#	Title	Singer(s)
1	"Ee Cheluvina Olavina"	S. P. Balasubrahmanyam, P. Susheela
2	"Kannage Aaseya"	S. P. Balasubrahmanyam, S. Janaki
3	"Jeevanavemba Rahasya"	S. P. Balasubrahmanyam, S. Janaki
4	"Sumne Alla Sikkodu"	S. Janaki
5	"Ee Daaha Bahala"	S. Janaki
