= Bahaddur Gandu =

- Theatrical Poster
- Directed by: A. V. Sheshagiri Rao
- Screenplay by: Chi. Udaya Shankar
- Produced by: Srikanth Nahata; Srikanth Patel
- Starring: Rajkumar; Jayanthi; Balakrishna; Aarathi; Dwarakish; Vajramuni
- Cinematography: S. V. Srikanth
- Edited by: S. P. N. Krishna; T. P. Velayudham
- Music by: M. Ranga Rao
- Production companies: Srikanth & Srikanth Enterprises
- Release date: 1976
- Running time: 141 minutes
- Country: India
- Language: Kannada

Bahaddur Gandu ( transl. Brave Man) is a 1976 Indian Kannada-language swashbuckler film directed by A. V. Sheshagiri Rao, starring Rajkumar, Jayanthi, Aarathi and Vajramuni. The movie saw a theatrical run of 19 weeks. The story was penned by the celebrated playwright H. V. Subba Rao based on William Shakespeare's play The Taming of the Shrew.

== Plot ==
Rajkumar plays an upright Panju, who stays in Bankapura with his mother. Due to the evil policies of crown prince Vajramuni and princess Jayanti, Panju and villagers are at the risk of losing their lands. When much pleading does not work, Panju leads farmers agitation to the palace, where he is captured, put to jail, and tortured. Panju escapes from the prison, kidnaps Jayanti to his village to teach her civic norms, and shows her the harsh realities normal people face each day. He gets the entire village relocated across the adjoining river, so that royal soldiers cannot trace them. He is able to turn the princess to appreciate the normal way-of-life, but faces the wrath of the Palace and administration. Can he turn the tides and win his biggest battle? The film also stars Arathi as a village girl who is in love with Panju, who gets killed by Vajramuni for thwarting his advances.

== Cast ==
- Rajkumar as Panju
- Jayanthi as Kamala
- Aarathi as Radha
- Advani Lakshmi Devi as Kalyani
- B. Jaya as a villager
- Shantha
- Pushpa
- Jayalakshmi
- T. N. Balakrishna as Dewan
- Vajramuni as Crown Prince Vikram
- Dwarakish as Panju's friend
- Rajashankar as King
- Thoogudeepa Srinivas as Senapati
- Rajanand as Siddappaji
- Joker Shyam as a villager
- Shani Mahadevappa
- Venkataraju
- Kunigal Ramanath

== Soundtrack ==
Bahaddur Gandu

Soundtrack album by M. Ranga Rao
- Released: 1976
- Genre: Feature film soundtrack
- Length: 19:39
- Label: Saregama

M. Ranga Rao composed the soundtrack, and lyrics were written by Chi. Udaya Shankar. The album consists of five soundtracks.

Track list
| No. | Title | Lyrics | Singer(s) | Length |
|---|---|---|---|---|
| 1. | "Maanavanaaguveya" | Chi. Udaya Shankar | Rajkumar | 4:16 |
| 2. | "Alle Nillu" | Chi. Udaya Shankar | P. B. Sreenivas, S. Janaki | 3:48 |
| 3. | "Muthinantha Mathondu" | Chi. Udaya Shankar | Rajkumar | 4:28 |
| 4. | "Gandu Endare Gandu" | Chi. Udaya Shankar | S. P. Balasubrahmanyam | 3:56 |
| 5. | "Hey Ninagagiye" | Chi. Udaya Shankar | Rajkumar | 3:11 |
| Total length: | | | | 19:39 |
