= Sri Srinivasa Kalyana =

1974 Indian Kannada mythological movie directed by Vijay

- DVD cover
- Directed by: Vijay
- Written by: Chi. Udayashankar
- Produced by: S. A. Srinivas
- Starring: Dr. Rajkumar; B. Saroja Devi; Manjula
- Cinematography: Chittibabu
- Edited by: P. Bhakthavathsalam
- Music by: Rajan–Nagendra
- Production company: Kanteerava Studios
- Release date: 11 October 1974
- Running time: 160 minutes
- Country: India
- Language: Kannada

Sri Srinivasa Kalyana ( transl. The wedding of Sri Srinivasa) is a 1974 Kannada-language Hindu mythological film directed by Vijay. Based on the story of Lord Venkateswara, the film stars Dr. Rajkumar, B. Saroja Devi and Manjula in key roles. It also featured the first screen appearances of Dr. Rajkumar's sons, Shiva Rajkumar and Raghavendra Rajkumar, as child actors. The movie was dubbed in Tamil as Ezhumalaiyan Dharisanam and in Telugu as Sri Tirupatikshetra Mahatyam (1977).

== Cast ==
- Dr. Rajkumar as Lord Venkateswara
- B. Saroja Devi as Goddess Lakshmi
- Manjula as Padmavathi
- Srinath as Narada
- Rajashankar as Hathiram Bhavaji
- Sampath as Akasha Raja
- M. Jayashree as Dharani Devi
- Advani Lakshmi Devi as Bakuladevi
- Vajramuni as Bhrigu
- Thoogudeepa Srinivas as Ravana
- H. Ramachandra Shastry as Chief priest
- B. V. Radha
- B. Jaya
- Pramila Joshai as Vasantha
- Kunigal Nagabhushan
- Honnavalli Krishna
- Jokey Shyam
- Bhatti Mahadevappa
- Suryakumar
- Bheema Rao
- Thipatur Siddaramaiah
- Indra Jorge
- Sushila Naidu
- Lakshmi Janardhan

Child artistes:

- Shiva Rajkumar (credited as Master Puttaswamy)
- Raghavendra Rajkumar (credited as Master Raghavendra)
- Ramaraj (credited as Master Ramaraj)
- Poornima (credited as Baby Poornima)

== Soundtrack ==
The music of the film was composed by the duo Rajan–Nagendra, with lyrics written by Chi. Udayashankar and Chi. Sadashivaiah.

Track #	Song	Singer(s)	Lyricist
1	"Naane Bhagyavathi"	Dr. Rajkumar, S. Janaki	Chi. Udayashankar
2	"Cheluvina Taare"	Dr. Rajkumar, S. Janaki	Chi. Udayashankar
3	"Pavadisu Paramathma"	S. P. Balasubrahmanyam	Chi. Udayashankar
4	"Jaya Jaya Jagadeesha"	S. P. Balsubrahmanyam, P. Susheela	Chi. Udayashankar
5	"Swami Srinivasa"	P. Susheela	Chi. Udayashankar
6	"Srinivasa Swamiya Kalyana"	Female chorus group	Chi. Udayashankar
7	"Iddiddu Iddange"	S. Janaki	Chi. Udayashankar
8	"Srimad Ramaramana"	S. P. Balasubramanyam	Chi. Sadashivaiah
9	"Tarala Dhruvana Tapake"	S. P. Balasubramanyam	Chi. Sadashivaiah
10	"Hinde Dwaparayuga"	P. B. Sreenivas	Chi. Sadashivaiah
11	"Hariye Nee Yugayugadi"	P. B. Sreenivas	Chi. Sadashivaiah
