= Bhale Huchcha =

- Film VCD cover
- Directed by: Y. R. Swamy
- Screenplay by: Chi. Udaya Shankar
- Story by: Chi. Udaya Shankar
- Produced by: Gopal Lakshman
- Starring: Rajkumar; Aarathi; Srinath; Sampath; Vajramuni
- Music by: Rajan–Nagendra
- Production company: Kanteerava Studio
- Release date: 1972
- Running time: 150 minutes
- Country: India
- Language: Kannada

Bhale Huchcha is a 1972 Indian Kannada-language film directed by Y. R. Swamy and produced by Gopal Lakshman. It stars Rajkumar and Aarathi. This film was dubbed into Telugu as Dasara Picchodu and released in 1973. This was the only Kannada movie of actress Helen. While Bangaarada Manushya which was released earlier that year was a blockbuster, the films that followed saw a dip in the numbers and it was reported that with the release of this movie, the industry was able to stabilise its footing again.

== Cast ==
- Rajkumar as Gopi
- Aarathi as Chandra
- Srinath as Naganna
- Sampath
- Vajramuni
- Thoogudeepa Srinivas as Sivakumar
- Dinesh
- Shakti Prasad
- Sriram
- Dr. Sridhara Rao
- Loknath
- Advani Lakshmi Devi
- Bangalore Nagesh
- Joker Shyam
- Y. R. Ashwath Narayana
- Comedian Guggu
- Mahadevappa
- Kunigal Ramanath
- Helen as cabaret dancer in song "Nodu Lovely Beauty"

== Soundtrack ==
The music of the film was composed by the duo Rajan–Nagendra.

=== Track list ===
#	Title	Singer(s)	Lyrics
1	"Yaaru Neenu"	P. B. Sreenivas, L. R. Eswari	Vijaya Narasimha
2	"Hey Ene Subbi"	P. B. Sreenivas	Hunsur Krishnamurthy
3	"Nodu Lovely Beauty"	S. Janaki	Geethapriya
4	"Ballige Hoovu Chenda"	P. B. Sreenivas, S. Janaki	Chi. Udaya Shankar
5	"Kallade Ekendu Balle"	P. B. Srinivas	Vijaya Narasimha
