= Pattanakke Banda Pathniyaru =

- Directed by: A. V. Sheshagiri Rao
- Written by: Chi. Udaya Shankar (dialogues)
- Screenplay by: A. V. Sheshagiri Rao
- Story by: H. N. Hoogar
- Produced by: S. D. Ankalagi; B. H. Chandannanawar; M. G. Hublikar; Surendra Ingle
- Starring: Srinath; Manjula; Lokesh; Padmapriya
- Cinematography: Annayya; Mallik
- Edited by: S. P. N. Krishna
- Music by: M. Ranga Rao
- Production company: Bhuvaneshwari Art Productions
- Distributed by: Bhuvaneshwari Art Productions
- Release date: 17 December 1980
- Running time: 145 min
- Country: India
- Language: Kannada

Pattanakke Banda Pathniyaru (transl. Wives arrived in the city) is a 1980 Indian Kannada-language film, directed by A. V. Sheshagiri Rao and produced by S. D. Ankalagi, B. H. Chandannanawar, M. G. Hublikar and Surendra Ingle. The film stars Srinath, Manjula, Lokesh and Padmapriya. The film has musical score by M. Ranga Rao. The movie was remade in 1982 in Telugu as Patnam Vachina Pativrathalu. The song Shankara Gangadhara was retained in the Telugu version. The film was also remade in Tamil as Pattanamthaan Pogalaamadi (1990).

== Cast ==
- Srinath
- Manjula
- Lokesh
- Padmapriya
- T. N. Balakrishna
- Vajramuni as Mangesh Bhai
- Dinesh
- Tiger Prabhakar as Fateh Khan
- R. N. Hoogar
- Sadashiva Brahmavar
- B. K. Shankar
- Uma Shivakumar
- Pramila Joshai
- Halam
- B. H. Chandannavar in guest appearance
- Surendra Ingale in guest appearance

== Soundtrack ==
The music was composed by M. Ranga Rao.

No.	Song	Singers	Lyrics	Length (m:ss)
1	"Elli Nanna Gilimariyu"	P. B. Sreenivas, S. P. Balasubrahmanyam	Chi. Udaya Shankar	04:19
2	"Hosa Baalu"	S. Janaki, S. P. Balasubrahmanyam	Chi. Udaya Shankar	04:13
3	"Malebilla Banna"	S. P. Balasubrahmanyam, S. P. Sailaja	Chi. Udaya Shankar	04:50
4	"Nanage Entha Anandavo"	S. Janaki, S. P. Balasubrahmanyam	Chi. Udaya Shankar	04:15
5	"Shankara"	S. Janaki, P. B. Sreenivas, S. P. Balasubrahmanyam, Bangalore Latha	Chi. Udaya Shankar	04:42
6	"Preethiya Thoreya"	S. Janaki	Chi. Udaya Shankar	04:51
