= Vasantha Lakshmi =

- Directed by: A. V. Seshagiri Rao
- Written by: H. V. Subba Rao (dialogues)
- Screenplay by: A. V. Seshagiri Rao
- Produced by: K. Vittala Kumar; K. V. Honnappa; K. V. Gurunath
- Starring: Srinath; Aarathi; Vishnuvardhan; Manjula
- Cinematography: S. V. Srikanth
- Edited by: P. Bhakthavathsalam
- Music by: Vijaya Bhaskar
- Production company: Vittal Movies
- Distributed by: Vittal Movies
- Release date: 30 September 1978
- Running time: 167 min
- Country: India
- Language: Kannada

Vasantha Lakshmi is a 1978 Indian Kannada-language film, directed by A. V. Seshagiri Rao and produced by K. Vittala Kumar, K. V. Honnappa and K. V. Gurunath. The film stars Srinath, Vishnuvardhan, Aarathi, and Manjula. The film has musical score by Vijaya Bhaskar. The movie is a remake of the 1974 Tamil movie Engamma Sapatham.

== Cast ==
- Vishnuvardhan as Chandru
- Srinath as Ravi
- Aarathi as Vasantha
- Manjula as Lakshmi
- M. P. Shankar as Kalingayya
- Leelavathi
- Pandari Bai as Annapoorna
- B. V. Radha
- Jayamalini
- B. Jaya
- Baby Indira as Young Lakshmi
- Baby Raasi as Young Vasantha
- Naveena
- K. S. Ashwath as Narayanappa
- Vajramuni
- Dwarakish
- Thoogudeepa Srinivas as Rowdy Chenayya
- Dinesh
- Tiger Prabhakar
- M. S. Sathya
- Ashwatha Narayana
- Jr. Shetty
- Comedian Guggu
- M. S. Umesh
- Balakrishna
- Narasimharaju
- Shivaram

== Soundtrack ==
The music was composed by Vijaya Bhaskar. The song Belli Modave reused the tune of the song Anbu Megame from the original version Engamma Sapatham which also had music composed by Vijaya Bhaskar.

No.	Song	Singers	Lyrics	Length (m:ss)
1	"Belli Modave Yelli Oduve"	S. P. Balasubrahmanyam, Vani Jairam	Chi. Udaya Shankar	03:10
2	"Devanu Thanda Yee Anubandha"	P. Susheela	Chi. Udaya Shankar	03:32
3	"Hennugalendoo Abaleyaralla"	S. Janaki, Vani Jairam	Chi. Udaya Shankar	03:13
4	"Kannu Kannu Bittukondu"	S. Janaki	R. N. Jayagopal	03:07
5	"Nadeyale Naduvu"	S. P. Balasubrahmanyam, K. J. Yesudas, S. Janaki, Vani Jairam	Chi. Udaya Shankar	03:08
