= Besuge =

- Directed by: Geethapriya
- Screenplay by: Geethapriya
- Story by: Ashwini
- Based on: Besuge by Ashwini
- Produced by: Padmaprabha
- Starring: Srinath; Manjula; K. S. Ashwath
- Cinematography: N. G. Rao
- Edited by: Bala G. Yadav
- Music by: Vijaya Bhaskar
- Production company: Srinidhi Films
- Release date: 1976
- Running time: 131 minutes
- Country: India
- Language: Kannada

Besuge is a 1976 Indian Kannada-language romance film directed by Geethapriya, based on a novel of the same name by Ashwini, and stars Srinath, Manjula and Cudavalli Chandrashekar in lead roles.

The film is seen as a landmark in the career of Geethapriya, both as a director and lyricist, and actor Srinath. At the 24th Filmfare Awards South, Srinath was awarded the Best Actor.

== Cast ==
- Srinath as Venu
- Manjula as Suma
- Sathyapriya as Liz
- Cudavalli Chandrashekar as Balu
- Jayalakshmi as Champa
- K. S. Ashwath as Venu's father
- M. V. Rajamma as Nagu, Venu's mother
- Shivaram as Ranga
- Chethan Ramarao

== Soundtrack ==
Besuge

Soundtrack album by Vijaya Bhaskar
- Released: 1976
- Genre: Feature film soundtrack
- Length: 23:14
- Label: Saregama

Vijaya Bhaskar scored the music film's music and for its soundtrack, the lyrics for which were written by Vijaya Narasimha, R. N. Jayagopal, Geethapriya, Shyamsundar Kulkarni and Chi. Udaya Shankar. The soundtrack album consists of six tracks. The track "Besuge", written by Geethapriya, is notable as it has the usage of the word "Besuge" 64 times in it. It is considered of the best songs written by him.

Track listing
No.	Title	Lyrics	Singer(s)	Length
1.	"Vasantha Baredanu"	Vijaya Narasimha	S. P. Balasubrahmanyam, Vani Jairam	4:27
2.	"Life is a Merry Melody"	R. N. Jayagopal	Vani Jairam	3:57
3.	"Besuge Besuge"	Geethapriya	S. P. Balasubrhamanyam, Vani Jairam	3:57
4.	"Yaava Hoovu Yaara Mudigo"	Shyamsundar Kulkarni	S. P. Balasubrahmanyam	4:25
5.	"Arere Intha Gandige"	Chi. Udaya Shankar	P. B. Sreenivas, Kasthuri Shankar, Anjali, Mahesh	4:08
6.	"Besuge Besuge I"	Geethapriya	Chorus	2:50
Total length:				23:14
