= Bangarada Gudi =

- Directed by: K. S. R. Das
- Written by: Chi. Udaya Shankar
- Screenplay by: M. D. Sundar
- Story by: Venus Mahija Samsthe
- Produced by: C. H. Prakash Rao
- Starring: Vishnuvardhan; Manjula; Ambareesh; Padmapriya
- Cinematography: S. S. Lal
- Edited by: Veerappa; SPS
- Music by: G. K. Venkatesh
- Production company: Venus Mahija Pictures
- Distributed by: Venus Mahija Pictures
- Release date: 13 August 1976
- Running time: 134 min
- Country: India
- Language: Kannada

Bangarada Gudi is a 1976 Indian Kannada film, directed by K. S. R. Das and produced by C. H. Prakash Rao. The film stars Vishnuvardhan, Manjula, Ambareesh and Padmapriya in the lead roles. The film has musical score by G. K. Venkatesh. The director remade the movie in Telugu in 1979 as Bangaru Gudi.

== Cast ==
- Vishnuvardhan as Vijay
- Manjula as Radha
- Ambareesh as Kamalesh
- Padmapriya as Aruna
- Vajramuni as Rayappa "Rama Rao" alias Johnny Roy
- Shivaram as Shami
- K. S. Ashwath as Ramanappa
- Gangadhar as Shankar
- Tiger Prabhakar as Jagath
- Chethan Ramarao
- Leelavathi as Mangala
- Indira (credited as Baby Indira)

== Soundtrack ==
All the songs are composed and scored by G. K. Venkatesh and written by Chi. Udayashankar.

| Track # | Song | Singer(s) |
|---|---|---|
| 1 | "Baruthiruva Baruthiruva" | S. P. Balasubrahmanyam |
| 2 | "Avasaravethake Nillu" | P. B. Srinivas, S. Janaki |
| 3 | "Ellirali Hegirali" | P. Susheela |
| 4 | "Rasikane Ba" | Vani Jairam |
| 5 | "Ninadene Irali" | SPB, P. Susheela |
| 6 | "Thayya Thakka" | SPB, S. Janaki |
| 7 | "Hayagide Hithavagide" | S. Janaki |
| 8 | "Arerare Arerare" | SPB, Vani Jairam |
