= Patnam Vachina Pativrathalu =

- Theatrical poster
- Directed by: Mouli
- Screenplay by: Mouli
- Based on: Pattanakke Banda Pathniyaru
- Produced by: Atluri Radhakrishna Murthy, Kommina Narayana Rao
- Starring: Chiranjeevi; Mohan Babu; Radhika; Geetha; Rama Prabha
- Music by: Satyam
- Production company: Srinivasa Productions
- Release date: 1 October 1982
- Country: India
- Language: Telugu

Patnam Vachina Pativrathalu is a 1982 Telugu film directed by Mouli in his Telugu debut. The film stars Chiranjeevi, Mohan Babu, Radhika, Geetha, Rao Gopal Rao and Nutan Prasad in important roles. Vijaya Bapineedu co-produced the film. It is a remake of the 1980 Kannada film Pattanakke Banda Pathniyaru. The film was a commercial success and ran for 280 days.

== Plot ==
Gopi (Chiranjeevi) and Mohan Babu are brothers living with their grandmother in a village. Gopi, the younger brother, has a B.Sc. in Agriculture and wishes to stay in the village after marriage, while Mohan Babu, the elder brother, is uneducated. Both brothers marry at the same time: Mohan Babu weds Devi, an educated woman, and Gopi marries Lalithamba, who is uneducated. Lalithamba prefers to live in the city after marriage.

Lalithamba and Devi try their best to convince their husbands to move to the city, but Gopi and Mohan Babu disagree. Finally, Lalithamba and Devi escape from their house one night without their husbands' knowledge. Lalithamba has a friend, Sakunthala, in the city. However, Devi and Lalithamba struggle to find Sakunthala's house and end up wandering the streets. They are approached by a woman who attempts to sell them to a brothel owner, Ganga Devi. The deal falls through, and the woman doesn't sell Devi and Lalithamba. Angered, Ganga Devi sends her people to capture Lalithamba and Devi. Ganga Devi's men kill the woman but fail to catch Lalithamba and Devi.

Unfortunately, Lalithamba and Devi unknowingly seek refuge in Ganga Devi's house. Realizing their mistake, they plan to escape. Lalithamba eventually finds her friend Sakunthala, and with her help, they try to flee. However, Ganga Devi's men catch them and lock them in a room. Meanwhile, Gopi and Mohan Babu, searching for their wives, arrive in the city and gather information on their whereabouts. They infiltrate Ganga Devi's house and rescue Lalithamba and Devi. After a climactic fight, the police arrive and arrest Ganga Devi. The four return to their village, safe and sound.

== Cast ==
- Chiranjeevi - Gopi
- Radhika - Lalithamba
- Mohan Babu -
- Geetha - Devi
- Nirmalamma - Narayanamma, Grandmother of Gopi
- Rama Prabha - Arundhatamma
- Nutan Prasad
- Rao Gopal Rao
- Vadivukkarasi - Sakunthala

== Production ==
After the success of Vaa Indha Pakkam (1981) in Tamil, which was also well received in its Telugu dubbed version, director Mouli gained recognition in the Telugu film industry. This success led to a direct Telugu movie offer. Despite not knowing Telugu, Mouli collaborated with the popular writer Jandhyala, who translated his script. Additionally, a writer-translator was provided to assist Mouli in on-the-spot improvisations. The resulting film, Patnam Vachina Pativrathalu, starring Chiranjeevi and Radhika in the lead roles, became a hit and ran for 280 days.

== Soundtrack ==
Music was composed by Satyam. The song Sankara Gangadhara from the Kannada version was retained in this film.

- "Neekunnadhe Kaastha"
- "SeethaRaama Swamy"
- "Sankaraa Gangaadharaa"
- "Vinukondi"
