= Gandu Bherunda =

1984 film by Rajendra Singh Babu

Gandubherunda
- Directed by: Rajendra Singh Babu
- Screenplay by: Rajendra Singh Babu
- Story by: H. V. Subba Rao
- Based on: Mackenna's Gold by J. Lee Thompson
- Produced by: H. N. Muddu Krishna
- Starring: Srinath; Ambareesh; Shankar Nag; Lakshmi; Jayamala
- Cinematography: P. S. Prakash
- Edited by: K. Balu
- Music by: Satyam
- Production company: Anjanadri Pictures
- Distributed by: Parijatha; Venkateshwara Pictures
- Release date: 30 March 1984
- Country: India
- Language: Kannada

Gandubherunda ( transl. Dual headed bird) is a 1984 Indian Kannada-language adventure drama film directed by Rajendra Singh Babu. It features an ensemble cast and is inspired by the 1969 American film Mackenna's Gold. The plot follows an epigraphist and a geologist who embark on a hunt for an ancient treasure on an island called "Hasta Dweepa" (Palm Island), linked to the 700-year-old Bherunda kingdom. The film is considered "technically brilliant" and was ahead of its time, although it did not perform well commercially upon its release. The 1987 Hindi film Khazana was partially based on this film. It was also the first collaboration between Srinath, Ambareesh and Shankar Nag.

== Plot ==
The films opens with a visual narration depicting a series of ancient paintings of a wealthy kingdom named Bherunda, which existed around 700 years ago in the erstwhile Mysore State (present-day Karnataka). The kingdom was ruled by King Aditya Devanarayana. As a battle with the kingdom's enemies loomed, the king ordered the kingdom's wealth to be transported and stored in a cave on a distant island. After the battle, the enemies returned empty-handed and the location of the treasure remained a mystery for centuries.

Mark Abraham (Vajramuni), an epigraphist and linguistic expert, discovers the writings of an explorer about the Bherunda kingdom's treasure and becomes determined to retrieve it. He is assisted by his student Myna (Jayamala). They are joined by Jai (Amrish Puri), a geologist, who informs Abraham that he has located the site where the shipwreck containing the treasure is buried on the island of "Hasta Dweepa." Together, they embark on a journey to retrieve the treasure, and Abraham kills Jai, with Myna's assistance, after they recover a medal from the wreck.

Raju (Srinath) and Bijju (Ambareesh) are brothers working for Abraham, living with their younger brother Chanda. Abraham promising them a share of the treasure, they set off to the island. However, Abraham, unwilling to share the wealth, kills Chanda and the rest of the crew on the boat, leaving Raju and Bijju wounded on the island. The brothers are rescued by Nayar (Shankar Nag), an islander who lives with his dog, Manja.The three return to the mainland and begin a new life, though they continue to harbor a grudge against Abraham.

Two years later, while working on a new project, Raju and Bijju uncover a trunk containing an ancient vase, which proves to be part of the treasure of Bherunda. Jai, who had survived the earlier attack but lost his left arm, closely monitors their progress. Jai convinces the brothers to join him in retrieving the treasure before Abraham can claim it. Jai plants his sister Champa (Lakshmi) in Abraham's team to acquire the map of the treasure’s location. . Abraham’s team sets out for the island, followed by Jai’s team.

In an attempt to escape with the map, Champa throws it into the sea and dives to retrieve it but loses it. Raju and Bijju help Champa to Jai’s boat, and they decide to stay ashore for the night. However, their boat is destroyed by Abraham's men.

Once on the island, Nayar reveals to the group that this is the same island where the brothers had arrived with Abraham two years prior. Abraham arrives with his team, having killed his crew and assistants, except for Myna, whom he stabs in the stomach on Jai's insistence, so that they share the wealth. Jai had previously betrayed the brothers and his sister, and he kills Nayar.

Jai and Abraham reach the cave where the treasure is hidden, discovering large quantities of gold. The brothers, along with Champa, follow them into the cave, and a fight ensues between the brothers and Jai and Abraham. During this battle, the cave is bombed by explosives set by Jai, resulting in the deaths of everyone except Bijju and Champa, who leave the cave with the treasure untouched.

== Cast ==
- Srinath as Raju
- Ambareesh as Bijju
- Shankar Nag as Nayar
- Lakshmi as Champa
- Jayamala as Myna
- Amrish Puri as Professor Jai
- Vajramuni as Mark Abraham
- Jayamalini
- Baby Rekha
- Balakrishna as James Robert
- Udaykumar
- Dinesh as Taggappa Sharanappa Mensinkai
- Sundar Krishna Urs as Babu
- M. S. Umesh

== Production ==
Ambareesh suggested to director Rajendra Singh Babu that he wanted a tiger fight in the film, and Babu reluctantly agreed. Ambareesh, however, was nervous about the fight and consumed alcohol to calm his nerves.

== Soundtrack ==
The soundtrack was composed by Satyam.

Track listing
No.	Title	Lyrics	Singer(s)	Length
1.	"Gaganake Soorya"	Chi. Udaya Shankar	P. B. Sreenivas, S. P. Balasubrahmanyam
2.	"Hey Enchini Maaraayre"	R. N. Jayagopal	S. Janaki
3.	"Novu Thumba Novu"	Doddarange Gowda	S. Janaki
4.	"Baare Baare Nannavale"	R. N. Jayagopal	S. P. Balasubrahmanyam, S. Janaki
5.	"Bairunda Bairunda"		S. P. Balasubrahmanyam, S. Janaki
