= Snehitara Savaal =

Snehithara Saval
- VCD cover
- Directed by: K. S. R. Das
- Written by: Kunigal Nagabhushan
- Screenplay by: M. S. Chakravarthy
- Story by: Ajantha Combines
- Produced by: A. R. Raju
- Starring: Vishnuvardhan; Ambareesh; Manjula; K. S. Ashwath
- Cinematography: M. Shekar
- Edited by: P. Venkateshwara Rao
- Music by: Satyam
- Production company: Ajantha Combines
- Distributed by: Ajantha Combines
- Release date: 23 September 1981
- Running time: 154 minutes
- Country: India
- Language: Kannada

Snehithara Saval is a 1981 Indian Kannada-language film, directed by K. S. R. Das and produced by A. R. Raju. The film stars Vishnuvardhan, Ambareesh, Manjula and K. S. Ashwath.

== Cast ==
- Vishnuvardhan as Jagan/Raja
- Manjula as Geetha
- Ambareesh as Kumar/Prasad
- K. Vijaya as Seetha
- K. S. Ashwath as Vishwanatha Rao
- M. Leelavathi as Seetha and Geetha mother
- Prabhakar as Sangram
- Dinesh
- Musuri Krishnamurthy
- Dheerendra Gopal
- Shakti Prasad
- Chethan Ramarao as Bhujanga Rao
- Surendar
- Dr. Sridhar
- Thipatur Siddaramaiah
- Shivaraj
- Kunigal Ramanath
- Halam
- Jayamalini
- Sumangali
- Master Suresh
- Master Anil
- Pandari Bai in guest appearance as Mary mother
- B. Jayashree in guest appearance
- Joe Simon in guest appearance
- Kunigal Nagabhushan in guest appearance
