= Prachanda Putanigalu =

- VCD cover
- Directed by: Geethapriya
- Screenplay by: T. N. Narasimhan
- Story by: M. K. Balaji Singh
- Produced by: M. K. Balaji Singh
- Starring: Master Ramakrishna Hegde; Master Bhanuprakash; Baby Indira; Master Naveen
- Cinematography: Kulashekar
- Edited by: K. Balu
- Music by: Upendra Kumar
- Production company: Varuna Films Creations
- Distributed by: Varuna Films Creations
- Release date: 1981
- Running time: 143 minutes
- Country: India
- Language: Kannada

Prachanda Putanigalu is a 1981 Indian Kannada-language children's film, directed by Geethapriya and produced by M. K. Balaji Singh. The film stars Master Ramakrishna Hegde, Master Bhanuprakash, Baby Indira and Master Naveen in lead roles. The film had musical score by Upendra Kumar. The film was remade by the director in 1982 in Hindi as Anmol Sitaare.

== Cast ==
- Master Ramakrishna Hegde as Ramu
- Master Bhanuprakash as Setu
- Baby Indira
- Master Naveen
- Sundar Krishna Urs SP Subhash Kulkarni
- Srilalitha
- Sadashiva Brahmavar
- Dinesh Railway Guard
- Shivaram
- Musuri Krishnamurthy as Police Constable 244
- Sudheer as Shambhu
- Prabhakar as Rudra
- Dwarakish as Himself
- Thoogudeepa Srinivas as Shankar
- Jr Narasimharaju
- Dingri Nagaraj
- Guggu
