= Pakka Kalla =

- Directed by: Y. R. Swamy
- Written by: Y. R. Ashwathnarayana Rao
- Screenplay by: Ma Ra
- Produced by: C. V. L. Shastry; Y. R. Ashwathnarayana Rao
- Starring: Srinath; Manjula; Ambareesh; Vajramuni
- Cinematography: R. Madhusudan
- Edited by: Yadav Victor
- Music by: Satyam
- Production company: Shastry Cine Associates
- Distributed by: Shastry Cine Associates
- Release date: 29 May 1979
- Country: India
- Language: Kannada

Pakka Kalla is a 1979 Indian Kannada film, directed by Y. R. Swamy and produced by C. V. L. Shastry and Y. R. Ashwathnarayana Rao. The film stars Srinath, Manjula, Ambareesh and Vajramuni in the lead roles. The film has musical score by Satyam. The story of the movie was loosely based on the 1976 Hindi movie Hera Pheri.

== Cast ==
- Srinath as Ravi
- Manjula as Latha
- Ambareesh as Shankar
- Vajramuni as Nagendra
- K. S. Ashwath as Rajaram
- Chethan Ramarao as Ramayya
- Leelavathi as Saraswathi
- Roopadevi as Roopa
- Rajanand as Jameendar Jagannath Rao
- Prabhakar fights with Ravi
- Jr. Shetty
- N. S. Rao maid at Rajaram's house
- Somashekar
- Ashwath Narayan as Lawyer Ashwath Narayan
- Sharapanjara Iyengar
- Hosanagara Rajaram
- Vishwanath
- Rajendra Prasad
- Master Rajesh
- Naveena
- Halam
- Baby Rathna
- Narasimharaju in Guest Appearance
- Jr. Narasimharaju
