= Avali Javali =

- Directed by: A. V. Sheshagiri Rao
- Written by: Doddarange Gowda (dialogues)
- Screenplay by: A. V. Sheshagiri Rao
- Story by: L. S. Iyer
- Produced by: P. Krishnaraj
- Starring: Srinath; Lokesh; Chandrashekar; Lokanath
- Cinematography: V. K. Kannan
- Edited by: Yadav Victor
- Music by: Satyam
- Production company: Mohan Murali Productions
- Distributed by: Mohan Murali Productions
- Release date: 27 June 1981
- Running time: 122 minutes
- Country: India
- Language: Kannada

Avali Javali is a 1981 Indian Kannada-language film, directed by A. V. Sheshagiri Rao and produced by P. Krishnaraj. The film stars Srinath, Lokesh, Chandrashekar and Lokanath. The film has musical score by Satyam.

== Cast ==
- Srinath
- Lokesh
- Chandrashekar
- Lokanath
- Manjula
- Hema Choudhary
- Ashalatha
- Musuri Krishnamurthy
- Maanu
- Sudheer
- Chethan Ramarao
- A. S. Murthy
- P. Krishnaraj in Guest Appearance
- N. Devaraj in Guest Appearance
- Master Murali in Guest Appearance
- Master Mohan in Guest Appearance
- Rekha Rao in Guest Appearance
- Uma Shivakumar
- Ramadevi
- Lalithamma
- Comedian Guggu

== Soundtrack ==
The music was composed by Satyam.

No.	Song	Singers	Lyrics	Length (m:ss)
1	"Endu Mareye"	S. Janaki	Vijaya Narasimha	03:50
2	"Sogasada Hennu"	S. P. Balasubrahmanyam	Dodda Range Gowda	03:10
3	"Sarasada Ee"	S. P. Balasubrahmanyam, S. Janaki	Vijaya Narasimha	04:22
4	"Romanchana"	S. P. Balasubrahmanyam, P. Susheela	Dodda Range Gowda	04:20
5	"Bare Mankaliye"	Ramesh, Bangalore Latha	Dodda Range Gowda	03:53
