= Themmadi Velappan =

- Theatrical release poster
- Directed by: Hariharan
- Screenplay by: S. L. Puram Sadanandan
- Based on: Sampathige Savaal (Kannada)(1974)
- Produced by: G. P. Balan
- Starring: Prem Nazir; Madhu; Jayabharathi; Kanakadurga; Sudheer
- Cinematography: T. N. Krishnankutty Nair
- Edited by: V. P. Krishnan
- Music by: M. S. Viswanathan
- Production company: Chanthamani Films
- Release date: 12 November 1976
- Country: India
- Language: Malayalam

Themmadi Velappan is a 1976 Indian Malayalam-language film, directed by Hariharan and produced by G. P. Balan. The film stars Prem Nazir, Madhu, Jayabharathi and K.P.A.C. Lalitha. It was released on 12 November 1976. The movie is a remake of the 1974 Kannada movie Sampathige Savaal starring Dr. Rajkumar.

== Cast ==
- Prem Nazir as Velappan
- Madhu as Raghavan
- Jayabharathi as Sindhu
- KPAC Lalitha as Kalyani
- Jose Prakash as Balakrishnan
- Pattom Sadan as Claver
- T. R. Omana as Bhavani
- Bahadoor as Kuttappan
- Kanakadurga as Madhavi
- Nellikode Bhaskaran as Velu
- P. K. Abraham as Gopalan
- Paravoor Bharathan as Chaathu
- Sudheer as Vijayan
- Master Raghu as Young Velappan
- Philomina as Aliyar's Mother

== Soundtrack ==
The music was composed by M. S. Viswanathan, with lyrics by Mankombu Gopalakrishnan.

| Song | Singers |
|---|---|
| "Dharmasamaram Vijayichu" | K. J. Yesudas, Chorus |
| "Indradhanussu Kondu" | K. J. Yesudas |
| "Thrisanku Swargathe" | K. J. Yesudas, Chorus |
| "Vayanaadan Kaavile" | P. Susheela |
