= Muyyige Muyyi =

- Directed by: Y. R. Swamy
- Written by: L. S. Iyer
- Screenplay by: Y. R. Swamy
- Produced by: P Krishna Raj
- Starring: Srinath; Vishnuvardhan; Aarathi
- Cinematography: R. Madhusudan
- Edited by: Yadav Victor
- Music by: Satyam
- Production company: Mohan Murali Productions
- Distributed by: Mohan Murali Productions
- Release date: 19 April 1978
- Running time: 142 minutes
- Country: India
- Language: Kannada

Muyyige Muyyi is a 1978 Indian Kannada-language film, directed by Y. R. Swamy and produced by P. Krishna Raj. The multi-starrer is led by Srinath, Vishnuvardhan, Aarathi, Manjula, Roja Ramani and Cudavalli Chandrashekar.

== Cast ==
- Srinath as Santosh
- Vishnuvardhan as Sanjay
- Aarathi as Uma
- Manjula as Pallavi
- Cudavalli Chandrashekar as Sagar
- Roja Ramani as Shanthi
- Ambareesh as Peter
- K. S. Ashwath as Nataraj
- Leelavathi as Kaveri
- Vajramuni as Gopal
- Shivaram as Shiva
- Lokanath as Shankaraiah
- Jayamalini as dancer
- Shankar Rao as Setty
- Sheshadri
- Rajaram
- Comedian Guggu
- Master Ramaprasad
- Master Madhu
- Susheela Naidu
- Udayashree
- Baby Rekha

== Soundtrack ==
The music was composed by Satyam with lyrics for the soundtrack written by Chi. Udaya Shankar, Vijaya Narasimha and Doddarangegowda.

No.	Song	Singers	Lyrics	Length (m:ss)
1	"Belli Chukki Belli Chukki"	S. P. Balasubrahmanyam, P. B. Sreenivas, Bangalore Latha, P. Susheela	Vijaya Narasimha	03:18
2	"Ee Sundara Chandiraninda"	K. J. Yesudas, S. Janaki	Vijaya Narasimha	03:06
3	"Ivanalia Avanalla"	S. Janaki	Chi. Udaya Shankar	03:27
4	"Ninne Illi Nodadhe Yelli Hode"	S. Janaki	Chi. Udaya Shankar	03:23
5	"EE mouna"	P.Susheela, S. P. Balasubrahmanyam	Doddarangegowda	03:23
