= Sneha Sedu =

- Film VCD cover
- Directed by: V. Madhusudhana Rao
- Screenplay by: V. Madhusudhana Rao
- Produced by: C. H. Praksh Rao
- Starring: Vishnuvardhan; Ambareesh; Manjula
- Cinematography: N. Balakrishnan
- Edited by: Veerappan
- Music by: S. Rajeswara Rao
- Distributed by: Mahija Films
- Release date: 1978
- Running time: 143 minutes
- Country: India
- Language: Kannada

Sneha Sedu is a 1978 Indian Kannada-language film directed by V. Madhusudhana Rao starring Vishnuvardhan, Ambareesh, Manjula and Anupama Mohan. The supporting cast features Vajramuni, Narasimharaju, Balakrishna and Chindodi Leela. The movie was remade in Malayalam in 1979 as Angakkuri starring Jayan, Sukumaran, Jayabharathi and Seema.

== Cast ==
- Vishnuvardhan as Rajesh
- Ambareesh as Nagaraja
- Manjula as Seetha
- Anupama Mohan (kuchipudi dancer)
- Vajramuni as Rao Saheb
- Shivaram
- Narasimharaju as Nandi
- Balakrishna
- Chindodi Leela
- Chethan Ramarao Rajesh father
- Ashwath Narayan as Thammayya
- M Jayashri as Savithramma, Seetha's blind mother

== Soundtrack ==
The music of Sneha Sedu was composed by S. Rajeswara Rao, with lyrics for the soundtrack written by Chi. Udaya Shankar.

Track listing
| No. | Title | Singer(s) | Length |
|---|---|---|---|
| 1. | "Saaku Saaku Mathu Saaku" | S. P. Balasubrahmanyam, P. Susheela |
| 2. | "Mathonda Olle Mathonda" | Vani Jairam |
| 3. | "Ore Nota Vayyari Aata" | Vani Jairam |
| 4. | "Badavara Maathigu" | P. Susheela, S. P. Balasubrahmanyam, Ramakrishna |
| 5. | "Entha Sogasu Ee Jeevana" | P. Susheela, S. P. Balasubrahmanyam |
| 6. | "Naagaraaniyu Horage Bandalu" | Vani Jairam |
