= Kalinga Sarpa =

- Directed by: D. Rajendra Babu
- Produced by: Nazre Narayan
- Starring: Shankar Nag; Manjula; Vajramuni; Thoogudeepa Srinivas
- Cinematography: P. S. Prakash
- Edited by: K. Balu
- Music by: Rajan–Nagendra
- Production company: Parimal Productions
- Release date: 17 July 1984
- Country: India
- Language: Kannada

Kalinga Sarpa is a 1984 Indian Kannada film, directed by D. Rajendra Babu and produced by Nazre Narayan. The film stars Shankar Nag, Manjula, Vajramuni and Thoogudeepa Srinivas in the lead roles. The film has musical score by Rajan–Nagendra.

== Cast ==
- Shankar Nag as Kalinga
- Manjula as Muthu
- Vajramuni as Subramanya
- Thoogudeepa Srinivas as prosecutor
- Sundar Raj as Rajesh
- Dinesh as Kodera
- Musuri Krishnamurthy as Nagaraj Rao
- Leelevathi as Kaveri
- K. Vijaya
- Uma Shivakumar as Sundaramma
- Renuka
- Chethan Ramarao as judge
- Anantharam Maccheri
- Bhadrachalam
- Bheema Rao
- Kannada Raju
- Prabhu
- Ambareesh
