= Mooroovare Vajragalu =

- DVD cover
- Directed by: Y. R. Swamy
- Screenplay by: Chi. Udaya Shankar
- Story by: Arun Kumar
- Produced by: I. Krishnamurthy; C. H. Madhava Rao
- Starring: Rajkumar; Srinath; Jayanthi; Aarathi; Manjula
- Cinematography: R. Madhu
- Edited by: N. C. Rajan
- Music by: R. Sudarshan
- Production companies: Chamundeshwari Studio; Sri Kanteerava Studio
- Distributed by: Devendra Arts
- Release date: 1973
- Running time: 131 minutes
- Country: India
- Language: Kannada

Mooroovare Vajragalu ( transl. Three and A Half Diamonds) is a 1973 Indian Kannada-language devotional film directed by Y. R. Swamy. The film stars Rajkumar, Srinath, Jayanthi, Aarathi and Manjula. Rajkumar played a dual role in the movie. The film was Rajkumar's last full-fledged movie in black-and-white - thus also making it his last dual role in a black and white movie. Doorada Betta, which released in the same year, was in black and white too, but had a few sequences in Eastmancolor. The movie was dubbed in Telugu in 1976 as Narada Vinodham.

== Plot ==
This story is based on the epic of Mahabharatha. While the characters are from the original Vyasa Bharatha, the stories seem to have their basis in folklore and Harikathe.

The story starts with Narada muni talking to a blind Kritavarma who has lost everything in life. He advises him to continue believing in Lord Vishnu by narrating to him the story of how Sudhama visited Lord Krishna's house and how his devotion in the Lord blessed him with everything. After this, they part ways.

Satyavati is a devotee of Shri Krishna. Her father is in search of a groom for her. One night the Lord appears in her dreams and tells her that she has to marry the first person she sees the next morning. As it happens it was Kritavarma. She explains to her dad that it was the Lord's wish and proceeds to marry him. Her father, while not being totally happy about this, agrees half-heartedly.

Satyavati prays to Ashtalakshmis devoutly and impresses them leading to them acquiring all wealth and prosperity along with Kritavarma getting his sight back. Soon, he also wins his kingdom back with the help of the king of the current Kingdom, who having heard the stories of his wife's miracles, agreed to help him.

When Sage Narada visits Shri Krishna, the Lord expresses to him Satyabhame's (Krishna's wife) desire to listen to an amazing story that had never been told before, nor will be told in the future. Narada requests him for some time to come up with such a story. He also finds out about Lord Balaram's wife expressing her frustration as to having only heard stories of him in a wrestling combat but never having seen him in action. But Lord Balarama expresses to her that there isn't a match for his strength, so if he finds a match, he'd be happy to entertain her and fulfil her wish. Narada takes leave after this.

Coming back to Kritavarma, Narada finds out that he's totally intoxicated by Satyavati's beauty and has been negligent towards his duties as a King. Narada visits him to see this for himself and notices that his attention was entirely towards his wife during his hospitality and not on him. Narada decides to teach him a lesson.

On a side quest, Narada also finds out that Duryodana was bragging that he is a supreme ruler and would never touch anybody's feet. Having seen all this Narada decides to weave a story that brings everything together: giving Lord Shri Krishna the amazing story his wife asked him, getting Lord Balarama to fight with a person who is a match for his strength, teaching Kritavarma a lesson and making Duryodana touch someone's feet.

Narada somehow gets Kritavarma to promise him to give him anything and asks him that he would like to spend a night with Satyavati. Shocked but helpless by his word, he broken-heartedly agrees to this. He has the difficult conversation with his wife and convinces her. A heart-broken Satyavati visits the hut of Narada and sees him meditating. She waits for him the whole night. The sage doesn't open his eyes. When the dawn is about to break, she asks one of her assistants to take her place based on the technicality that the request was for one night and the night was over. Narada finds out that she has left and curses her, turning her into a horse because of her fickle-mindedness. And she'd henceforth spend her time wandering like a horse as did her mind. He also tells Kritavarma that her curse would be broken when she is touched by three and a half diamonds. (Metaphorically, three and a half great people)

Despite Kritavarma's best attempts to keep the horse safe, it keeps wandering off to places and reaches the kingdom ruled by Subuddhi, a king who was suffering from leprosy. His soldiers tell him that they've found a horse so beautiful that it looked like it had descended from Heaven. Subuddhi wishes to see it and as soon as he touches it, he's cured. Elated by this, he wishes to keep this horse with him.

Narada visits Lord Balarama and informs him that King Subuddhi has found a divine horse and such a horse should be with a powerful king as Balarama himself and not anybody else. He leaves.

He also tells Subuddhi that Lord Balarama is coming to steal it from them and he has to do something about it. Subuddhi asks Narada himself for some advice and Narada tells him that the Pandavas who are in their Vanavasa (exile) would help them. And Bhima would never step down from helping anyone in need if he once gave them his word. Subuddhi seeks Bhima and tricks him into giving a word that he would protect him at any cost and asks him to swear on Lord Shri Krishna to make sure he doesn't break his vow. Bhima finds this out and is enraged by finding out that Subuddhi was seeking protection from Lord Balarama himself. But now he has to protect him because he's sworn in the Lord's name to protect him. He is choiceless now and he decides to fight.

Narada also visits Duryodhana and tells him about the divine horse and that such a horse should be with him and nobody else. He also advises him that Krishna and Balarama can't be defeated easily. Hence, he should seek alliance of the Pandavas but he can later betray the Pandavas after winning, as they are pretty helpless by themselves in their vanavasa. Duryodhana is impressed by this plan and agrees to go ahead with it.

Everybody is set to wage a war. While Krishna and Arjuna are fighting each other with bow and arrow, Balarama chooses to fight Bhima in a hand-to-hand combat. Balarama fights Bhima fulfilling the promise given to his wife. Bhima wins the fight and then soon goes and gets hold of the horse. Seeing this even Krishna and Balarama follow. All of them completely surround the horse, and start fighting for it. They get a hold of it and pretty much make a tug of war out of it. Narada tells Duryodhana that he has to go and hold the legs of the horse to prevent it from running away. Also, that was the only place available as the rest of them had already completely covered it, face to tail. Having been touched by three and a half diamonds (Krishna, Balarama, Bhima and Duryodhana), the horse transforms back into Satyavati.

(Note: Duryodhana is the half diamond. This can be understood in two ways: One, because he's a half-good and half-bad hearted human. Or that he was just touching the feet of the horse and not holding on to the horses completely like the other three).

Narada immediately points out that Duryadhana who was bragging that he'd never touch anyone's did touch a person's feet now, breaking his arrogance. He also points out to Kritavarma that he had to do all this to teach him a lesson for his negligence towards his Kingdom.

Finally, when Lord Shri Krishna asks Narada why he went to such extents of bringing his favourite Pandavas against him, Narada replies that it was because of his own desire to listen to a story that has never happened before, nor the one that will happen in the future. So he had to manipulate the present into such impossible extremities. The movie ends with all of them laughing at this.

== Cast ==
- Rajkumar as Narada and Sri Krishna
- Srinath as Kritavarma
- Jayanthi as Satyavati
- Aarathi as Rukmini
- Manjula as Bhama
- H. R. Shastry as Sudhama
- Leelavathi as wife of Sudama
- K. S. Ashwath as Dharmaja
- Thoogudeepa Srinivas as Bhima
- Ramesh as Arjuna
- Rajashankar as Balarama
- Vajramuni as Duryodhana
- Prabhavati
- Shanimahadevappa as Shakuni
- B. Jaya as Saraswathi

== Soundtrack ==
The music of the film was composed by R. Sudarshanam. The lyrics of the soundtrack were penned by Chi. Sadashivaiah and Chi. Udaya Shankar.

Mooroovare Vajragalu

Soundtrack album to Mooroovare Vajragalu by R. Sudarshanam
- Released: 1973
- Language: Kannada

=== Track list ===
#	Title	Singer(s)
1	"Mangala Roopini"	S. Janaki
2	"Krishna Endare"	S. Janaki, Jayadev
3	"Padmini Padmaalaya"	S. Janaki
4	"Sathiyu Bandalu"	K. J. Yesudas
