= Kiladi Jodi =

- Directed by: S. V. Rajendra Singh Babu
- Screenplay by: S. V. Rajendra Singh Babu
- Produced by: K. Venkatesh Dutt
- Starring: Vishnuvardhan; Srinath; Lakshmi
- Cinematography: P. S. Prakash
- Edited by: K. Balu
- Music by: Rajan–Nagendra
- Production company: V. V. International
- Release date: 1978
- Running time: 162 minutes
- Country: India
- Language: Kannada

Kiladi Jodi is 1978 Indian Kannada language action-adventure film directed by S. V. Rajendra Singh Babu. Co-written by H. V. Subba Rao, the film stars Vishnuvardhan, Srinath, and Lakshmi (in a dual role), alongside guest appearances by Ambareesh and Jayamalini. Produced by K. Venkatesh Dutt under the V. V. International banner, it features cinematography by P. S. Prakash, editing by K. Balu, and a musical score composed by the duo Rajan–Nagendra.

Following the success of the film, Babu remade and directed the film in Hindi as Ek Se Bhale Do, released in 1985.

== Plot ==
Jaggu (Srinath) and George Fernandes (Vishnuvardhan) are two small-time conmen who reform after meeting George’s lover, Jenny (Lakshmi). Jenny and her foster father Williams (M. P. Shankar) are in distress when a woman who resembles Jenny—Radha (also Lakshmi)—enters the scene, embroiled in personal and criminal troubles. Jaggu and George step in to help, leading to a complex web of mistaken identities, moral dilemmas, and family drama. Their loyalty and friendship are tested as they navigate this situation, culminating in a resolution that reunites lovers and brings justice.

== Cast ==
- Vishnuvardhan as George Fernandes
- Srinath as Jaggu
- Lakshmi in dual role as Prema (Radha) and Jenny (Lakshmi)
- M. P. Shankar as Williams, Jenny's foster father
- Leelavathi as Elizabeth, William's wife
- Dinesh as Vishakantayya, Prema's foster father
- Uma Shivakumar as Parvathi, Vishakantayya's wife
- K. S. Ashwath as Sadaananda, father of Radha and Lakshmi
- Pandari Bai as Jaggu's mother
- Vajramuni as Venu
- Upasane Seetharam as a church father
- Shaktiprasad as Joseph Bonanza
- M. S. Umesh as Taxi driver
- Ambareesh (guest appearance)
- Jayamalini

== Soundtrack ==
The music was composed by Rajan-Nagendra making their first collaboration with Babu. The songs were sung by S. P. Balasubrahmanyam, K. J. Yesudas and S. Janaki while the lyrics were written by Chi. Udayashankar and Doddarange Gowda. The song "Naachike Inneke" was recreated in 2022 for the film Ranchi.

No.	Title	Lyrics	Singer(s)	Length
1.	"Naachike Inneke"	Chi. Udayashankar	S. P. Balasubrahmanyam, S. Janaki
2.	"Kanasinali Nodidenu"	Chi. Udayashankar	S. P. Balasubrahmanyam, S. Janaki
3.	"Krishnaswamy Ramaswamy"	Chi. Udayashankar	S. P. Balasubrahmanyam, S. Janaki
4.	"Kiladi Jodi Kiladi Jodi"	Chi. Udayashankar	S. P. Balasubrahmanyam, K. J. Yesudas
5.	"Aadabeku Karate"	Doddarange Gowda	S. P. Balasubrahmanyam
