= Bhairava (film) =

1994 film directed by Raj Kishor

- Directed by: Raj Kishor
- Screenplay by: Raj Kishor
- Story by: Raj Kishor
- Produced by: N. Kumar
- Starring: Jaggesh; Nandini Singh; Vajramuni
- Music by: M. M. Keeravani
- Production company: Sri Lakshmi Films
- Release date: 1994
- Country: India
- Language: Kannada

Bhairava is a 1994 Indian Kannada language romantic action film written and directed by Raj Kishor and produced by N. Kumar. The film stars Jaggesh in the role of a speech impaired young man, Bhairava "Bhaira", enslaved by his uncle and Vajramuni as the tyrannical uncle, Nanjegowda. Nandini Singh played the female lead while Doddanna and Pramila Joshai played other key roles. The film has a musical score by M. M. Keeravani.

The film portrays the life of Bhairava, a speech impaired man, almost enslaved and tortured by his uncle and considered to be an expendable by the villagers. His life takes a turn after he falls in love with a doctor and in the process gets to know certain shocking secrets which forces him to unite the villagers and rebel against his master.

== Cast ==
- Jaggesh
- Nandini Singh
- Vajramuni
- Pramila Joshai
- Doddanna
- Killer Venkatesh
- Ratnakar

== Soundtrack ==
- Chandana Seere Chandana -
- Love Lovuve -
- Kannada Mandidinu -
