= Anmol Sitaare =

- Directed by: Geethapriya
- Starring: Rakesh Bedi; Madan Puri; Seema Deo
- Music by: Nadeem-Shravan
- Release date: 1982
- Country: India
- Language: Hindi

Anmol Sitaare is a 1982 Bollywood film directed by Geethapriya. The film was a remake of director's own 1981 Kannada film Prachanda Putanigalu.

== Cast ==
- Rakesh Bedi as Kaushik Srivatav
- Madan Puri as Pukhraj Srivastav
- Seema Deo as Suman Srivastav

== Soundtrack ==
1. "Aasman Ke Ham Anmol Sitarey Hain" - Anwar, Anuradha Paudwal
2. "Apne Hindustan Ke Sundar" - Anwar, Anuradha Paudwal
3. "Choron Ko Pakadne Ham Chale Hain" - Alka Yagnik, Sapna Mukherjee, Amit Kumar, Preeti Sagar, Vinay Mandke
4. "Jat Hanuman" - Mahendra Kapoor
5. "Yeh Duniya Hai Natakshala" - Alka Yagnik, Amit Kumar, Shabbir Kumar
6. "You Don't Know What We Are" - Anwar, Amit Kumar, Alka Yagnik, Preeti Sagar, Dilraj Kaur
