= Manjula (Kannada actress) =

Indian actress (1954–1986)

- Born: Honnenahalli Shivanna Manjula; 8 November 1954; Tumkur, Mysore State (now Karnataka), India
- Died: 12 September 1986 (aged 31); Bangalore, India
- Resting place: 13.371298°N 77.087395°E
- Occupation: Film actress
- Years active: 1966–1986
- Spouse: Amrutham
- Children: 1

Honnenahalli Shivanna Manjula (8 November 1954 – 12 September 1986), known mononymously as Manjula was an Indian actress who mainly worked in Kannada films and a few Tamil (credited as Kumari Manjula) and Telugu films (credited as Kannada Manjula). Regarded one of the most successful and prominent actresses in the history of Kannada cinema, Manjula was particularly noted for her versatility. During the 70s and early 80s she enacted a variety of roles and appeared in around 100 films, ranging in genre from urban romances to socio-realist dramas to rural themes. In a shor span of under 10 years she was the recipient of critical accolades and many awards for her performances, including a Filmfare Award.

Manjula started her career as a child artist at the age of 11 in the 1966 film Mane Katti Nodu and subsequently made her debut as a heroine in the M. R. Vittal directed film Yaara Sakshi (1972). In 1973 she appeared in the multistarrer film Mooruvare Vajragalu where she was paired with Dr. Rajkumar. Her biggest breakthrough came in 1974 with Eradu Kanasu. Shec ontinued to act as Dr. Rajkumar's heroine in Sampathige Savaal (1974), Bhakta Kumbara (1974), Daari Tappida Maga (1975) and Mayura (1975) which were all highly successful at the box-office.

Her pairing with Srinath, Shankar Nag and Vishnuvardhan resulted in multiple successful films that include Besuge (1976), Bangarada Gudi (1976), Sose Tanda Soubhagya (1977), Kittu Puttu (1977), Singaporenalli Raja Kulla (1978), Muyyige Muyyi (1978), Vasantha Lakshmi (1978) and Seetharamu (1979). Her role in Deepa (1977) garnered her wider recognition and her first Filmfare Award for Best Actress.

In the early 1980s she continued playing leading roles in several successful films including, Moogana Sedu (1980), Janma Janmada Anubandha (1980), Nee Nanna Gellalare (1981), Snehitara Savaal (1981), Guna Nodi Hennu Kodu (1982) and Kalinga Sarpa (1984). Her last notable role was in Savira Sullu where she played a supporting character. The long-delayed film Mana Gedda Maga came as a posthumous release in 1992.

== Personal life ==
Manjula was born on 8 November 1954 in Honnenahalli, a village in Tumkur District, Karnataka. Her father, M. H. Shivanna, was a police sub inspector while mother, Deveramma was a homemaker.

She was married to film director Amrutham who directed her in Hudugaatada Hudugi (1976) and Kanasu Nanasu (1976). The couple had a son, Abhishek. The couple had separated over differences before her accidental death in 1986.

== Death ==
Manjula died after suffering burns in a kitchen fire on 19 September 1986. While initially deemed an accident, the Times of India reported the death as suicide.

== Career ==
Manjula started her acting career in 1965 with the drama troupe Prabhat Kalavidaru. She entered the Kannada film industry in a small role in Mane Katti Nodu in 1966. Her debut as a heroine was in the 1972 film Yaara Saakshi, directed by veteran director M. R. Vittal. In a career spanning 10 plus years she shared the screen with all the top Kannada actors including Rajkumar, Vishnuvardhan, Srinath, Ashok and Shankar Nag. Her most successful pairing was with Srinath and they acted together in about 35 films.

She starred in over one hundred films. She specialized in the role of the bold village belle which brought her huge success and shw was a top Kannada heroine in the late 1970s. Some of her notable films include Sampathige Savaal, Eradu Kanasu, Sose Thanda Sowbhagya, Besuge and Seetharamu. She also acted with well known actors in other languages like Ramakrishna (Telugu), Kamalahasan and Rajinikanth (Tamil).

== Filmography ==
=== Kannada ===
Year	Film	Role	Notes
1966	Mane Katti Nodu	Manju	Child actress
1967	Padhavidhara		Child actress
1969	Eradu Mukha	Nalini	Child actress (credited Kumari Manjula)
1972	Yaara Sakshi		Debut as lead actress
1973	Mooroovare Vajragalu	Satyabhama	
1974	Eradu Kanasu	Lalitha	
1974	Sampathige Savaal	Durga	
1974	Bhakta Kumbara	Manju	
1974	Professor Huchuraya	Geetha	
1974	Sri Srinivasa Kalyana	Padmavathi	
1975	Devara Gudi	Vasanthi	
1975	Daari Tappida Maga	Pushpa	
1975	Ninagagi Naanu	Prathima	
1975	Mayura	Premavati	
1975	Nireekshe	Vasumathi	
1975	Hennu Samsarada Kannu	Radha	
1976	Hudugatada Hudugi	Sujatha	
1976	Baduku Bangaravayithu	Mahadevi	
1976	Besuge	Suma	
1976	Chiranjeevi	Sharada	
1976	Bangarada Gudi	Radha	
1976	Thulasi	Hema	
1976	Kanasu Nanasu	Priya	
1977	Deepa	Deepa	Filmfare Award for Best Actress – Kannada
1977	Sri Renukadevi Mahatme	Lakshmidevi	
1977	Dhanalakshmi	Rohini	
1977	Bayasade Banda Bhagya	Shanthi	
1977	Sose Tanda Soubhagya	Geetha	
1977	Thayigintha Devarilla	Geetha	
1977	Kittu Puttu	Roopa	
1977	Ganda Hendathi	Geetha	
1977	Kumkuma Rakshe	Seetha	
1977	Galate Samsara	Janaki	
1977	Chanda Marutha		Special appearance
1977	Veera Sindhura Lakshmana		Special appearance
1978	Anuraga Bandhana		Special appearance
1978	Halli Haida	Parvathi	
1978	Muyyige Muyyi	Pallavi	
1978	Aparadhi Naanalla	Pankaja	
1978	Nanna Prayaschittha	Suneetha	
1978	Sneha Sedu	Seetha	
1978	Vasantha Lakshmi	Lakshmi	
1978	Chithegu Chinthe	Malini	
1978	Bhale Huduga	Geetha	
1978	Madhura Sangama	Sharada	
1978	Singaporenalli Raja Kulla	Thara	
1979	Adalu Badalu	Latha/Bangari	Special appearance
1979	Aliya Devaru	Geetha	
1979	Seetharamu	Seetha	
1979	Pakka Kalla	Latha	
1979	Putani Agent 123		
1979	Savathiya Neralu	Padmini	
1979	Preethi Madu Thamashe Nodu	Madhavi	
1979	Mallige Sampige		
1979	Ene Barali Preethi Irali		
1980	Point Parimala	Parimala	
1980	Rama Parashurama		
1980	Rama Lakshmana		
1980	Moogana Sedu	Mangala	
1980	Haddina Kannu	"Benne" Bhagya	
1980	Manjina There	Kusuma	
1980	Usha Swayamvara	Usha	
1980	Simha Jodi	Uma	
1980	Manku Thimm		
1980	Janma Janmada Anubandha	Putti	
1980	Mithuna	Raaji	
1980	Pattanakke Banda Pathniyaru	Maananda	
1980	Rusthum Jodi	Padma	Special appearance
1981	Simhada Mari Sainya		Special appearance
1981	Nee Nanna Gellalare	Nalini	
1981	Premanubandha	Vaasanthi	
1981	Avali Javali	Geetha	
1981	Guru Shishyaru	Chitralekha	
1981	Mareyada Haadu	Ashwini	
1981	Snehitara Savaal	Geetha	
1981	Shikari	Aasha	
1982	Rudri	Rudramma	
1982	Kempu Hori		
1982	Chellida Raktha	Girija	
1982	Mareyalagada Kathe	Shanti	
1982	Swarnamahal Rahasya		
1982	Guna Nodi Hennu Kodu	Umaa	
1982	Benki Chendu	Seetha	
1982	Mava Sose Saval	Radha	
1982	Snehada Sankole	Nalini	
1982	Betthale Seve	Devi	
1982	Archana	Rani	Special appearance
1982	Hasyaratna Ramakrishna	Radhasani, dancer	Special appearance
1983	Kranthiyogi Basavanna	Neelambike	
1983	Hosa Theerpu	Dancer	Special appearance
1983	Keralida Hennu	Jayalakshmi	Special appearance
1983	Ananda Sagara	Dhairyalakshmi	Special appearance
1984	Onti Dhwani	Latha	Special appearance
1984	Kalinga Sarpa	Muthu	
1984	Enka Manka		
1985	Savira Sullu	Durga	
1985	Bhayankara Bhasmasura		
1992	Mana Gedda Maga	Chandraa	

=== Other languages ===
Year	Film	Role	Language	Notes
1974	Thota Ramudu	Durga	Telugu	
1975	Pooja	Lalitha	Telugu	(remake of Eradu Kanasu)
1975	Puthu Vellam		Tamil	
1975	Maalai Sooda Vaa	Radha	Tamil	
1975	Edupparkai Pillai		Tamil	
1980	Kaalam Badhil Sollum		Tamil	

Citations

Sources

- "Kumari Manjula [Kannada Manjula]". Antrukandamugam.wordpress.com. 11 May 2016.
