= A. V. Seshagiri Rao =

Kannada film director

- Born: 1926
- Died: 17 June 2007 (aged 81); Chennai, Tamil Nadu, India
- Occupation: Film director

A. V. Seshagiri Rao (1926 – 17 June 2007) was a Kannada film director.

== Film career ==
He started his film career at a young age and directed about 50 films including in Kannada, Telugu and Tamil. He made his directorial debut in Telugu film Pendli Pilipu starring N. T. Rama Rao and Devika in 1962. He gave blockbusters like Rajkumar-starrer Sampath Ge Sawal, Bahadur Gandu and Bettadha Huli to the Kannada film industry. His last film was Bahadura Hennu in which actress Roopa Ganguly had played the lead role.

== Filmography ==
=== Kannada ===
No.	Year	Film
1	1965	Bettada Huli
2	1968	Hoovu Mullu
3	1969	Makkale Manege Manikya
4	1973	Jaya Vijaya
5	1974	Sampathige Savaal
6	1975	Hennu Samsarada Kannu
7	1976	Baduku Bangaravaythu
8	1976	Bahaddur Gandu
9	1976	Raja Nanna Raja
10	1977	Sose Tanda Soubhagya
11	1977	Shrimanthana Magalu
12	1978	Vasantha Lakshmi
13	1979	Naniruvude Ninagagi
14	1979	Nentaro Gantu Kallaro
15	1980	Ravi Chandra
16	1980	Haddina Kannu
17	1980	Pattanakke Banda Pathniyaru
18	1981	Avali Javali
19	1982	Guna Nodi Hennu Kodu
20	1983	Keralida Hennu
21	1984	Maryade Mahal
22	1984	Premave Balina Belaku
23	1984	Pavithra Prema
24	1985	Kunkuma Tanda Soubhagya
25	1989	Thaligagi
26	1993	Bahaddur Hennu
27	1961	Pendli Pilupu (Telugu)
28	1971	Andam Kosam Pandem (Telugu)

== Death ==
He died following a fall at his house in Chennai, India, where died of brain haemorrhage.
