= Giri Kanye =

- DVD cover
- Directed by: Dorai–Bhagavan
- Story by: Bharathisutha
- Produced by: A. Dwarakanath
- Starring: Rajkumar; Jayamala; Vajramuni
- Cinematography: R. Chittibabu
- Edited by: P. Bhaktavatsalam
- Music by: Rajan–Nagendra
- Production company: Padmashree Enterprises
- Release date: 1977
- Running time: 138 minutes
- Country: India
- Language: Kannada

Giri Kanye is a 1977 Indian Kannada-language drama film directed by the Dorai–Bhagavan duo. It is based on the novel Girikannika by Bharathisutha. The film stars Rajkumar, Jayamala and Vajramuni. The film was a musical blockbuster with all the songs composed by Rajan–Nagendra considered evergreen hits. The movie saw a theatrical run of 25 weeks. Rajinikanth was initially selected to play the antagonist which was eventually played by Vajramuni. This was the first movie in which all the songs of the album were sung by Rajkumar.

== Cast ==
- Rajkumar as Chenna
- Jayamala as Cheluvi
- Vajramuni as Keshava
- C. K. Kalavathi as Savithri, Keshava's wife
- Thoogudeepa Srinivas as Choma
- Tiger Prabhakar
- Sampath
- Shani Mahadevappa
- Joker Shyam
- Venkatraju
- Shanthamma as Cheluvi's grandmother
- B. Jaya as Jaya

== Soundtrack ==
The music of the film was composed by Rajan–Nagendra with lyrics by Chi. Udaya Shankar. All the songs composed for the film were received extremely well. The song "Thai Thai Bangari" was later reused by Rajan-Nagendra as "Intinti Ramayanam" for Telugu film Intinti Ramayanam and as "Veetukku Veedu" for Tamil film Veettukku Veedu Vasappadi. It was remixed in Ashoka (2003) starring Shivarajkumar. Rajan-Nagendra reused the tune of Nagunagutha Nee Baruve for the 1979 Telugu movie Sommokadidhi Sokokadidhi as Tholivalapu Tondarulu.

Track listing
No.	Title	Singer(s)	Length
1.	"Yenendu Naa Helali"	Rajkumar	4:34
2.	"Thai Thai Bangari"	Rajkumar	4:19
3.	"Nagunagutha Nee Baruve"	Rajkumar, S. Janaki	3:25
4.	"Koodi Balona"	Rajkumar, S. P. Balasubrahmanyam, S. Janaki	4:43
5.	"Yaaru Neenu"	Rajkumar	4:22
