= Nee Nanna Gellalare =

- Film poster
- Directed by: Vijay
- Screenplay by: M.D. Sundar
- Story by: M.D. Sundar
- Produced by: S.A. Srinivas
- Starring: Rajkumar; Manjula; K. S. Ashwath; Balakrishna
- Cinematography: J.P. Selvaraj; E.S. Reddy
- Edited by: P. Bhaktavatsalam
- Music by: Ilaiyaraaja
- Production company: A.V.M Studio
- Distributed by: Vajreshwari Combines
- Release date: 23 May 1981
- Country: India
- Language: Kannada

Nee Nanna Gellalare is a 1981 Indian Kannada-language film directed by Vijay and produced by S.A. Srinivas. The film stars Rajkumar and Manjula .

Though the movie managed to recover its budget, the movie's performance is considered to be underwhelming with a theatrical run of only 63 days (approximately) which was the lowest ever for a Rajkumar movie until the release of the 1987 film, Ondu Muttina Kathe, which, however, was more of an art movie with an immense cult following. This is the only movie of Rajkumar for which Ilaiyaraaja was the music composer.

== Cast ==
- Rajkumar as Srikanth
- Manjula as Nalini
- K. S. Ashwath as Eshwaraiah
- Balakrishna as Hayavadana Rao
- Sudarshan as Venu
- Chi. Udaya Shankar as David
- Subhashini as Roopa
- Thoogudeepa Srinivas as Yogi
- Sudheer as Suri
- Johnny as David's henchman
- Shivaprakash
- Uma Shivakumar

== Soundtrack ==
The music of the film was composed by Ilaiyaraaja with lyrics penned by Chi. Udaya Shankar. I Love You was set in Carnatic Raaga called Kapi; Anuraga Enaytu is based on Madhuvanthi raaga while the song Nanna Neenu Gellalaare is based on Shuddha Dhanyasi and Hindola raagas.

The soundtrack I Love You has been recreated in a number of later movies - while the movie Moorane Class Manja B.Com Bhagya (2008) recreated the entire song using the original soundtrack, the movie Circus (2009) used the opening lines of the song. The opening lines were also recreated in a sequence for the movie - The Villain (2018). The song "Nanna Neena" was recreated in the film Dhool (2011).

Nee Nanna Gellalare

Soundtrack album to Nee Nanna Gellalare by Ilaiyaraaja
- Released: 1980
- Language: Kannada
- Label: Sangeetha Music

Ilaiyaraaja chronology
Kotha Jeevithalu (1981)	Nee Nanna Gellalare (1980)	Tik Tik Tik (1981)

=== Track list ===
#	Title	Singer(s)
1	"Nanna Neenu Gellalare"	Dr. Rajkumar, S. Janaki
2	"I Love You (Jeeva Hoovagide)"	Dr. Rajkumar, S. Janaki
3	"Anuraga Enaythu"	Dr. Rajkumar
4	"Nanna Muddina"	S. Janaki
