= Ravichandra =

Ravi Chandra
- Directed by: A. V. Sheshagiri Rao
- Written by: Shankar - Sundar
- Screenplay by: Shankar - Sundar
- Produced by: Parvathamma Rajkumar
- Starring: Rajkumar; Savitri; Sumalatha; Lakshmi
- Cinematography: Annayya; Mallik
- Edited by: P. Bhaktavatsalam
- Music by: Upendra Kumar
- Production company: Poornima Enterprises
- Release date: 1980
- Running time: 164 minutes
- Country: India
- Language: Kannada

Ravi Chandra is a 1980 Kannada-language romantic drama film directed by A. V. Sheshagiri Rao, written by Shankar-Sundar and produced by Parvathamma Rajkumar. The film starred Rajkumar in dual roles along with Lakshmi and Sumalatha in her Kannada debut. Veteran actress Savitri featured in a prominent role in this film. This was Sumalatha's debut film in Kannada. The screenplay, dialogues and lyrics are written by Chi. Udaya Shankar.

This was Rajkumar's immediate release after Nanobba Kalla which also had him in dual roles - making it the only instance in his career where he appeared in dual roles in successive movies.

== Cast ==
- Dr. Rajkumar in a dual role as Ravi and Chandra
- Lakshmi as Shanti
- Sumalatha as Sheela (voice dubbed by B. Jayashree)
- Savitri as Ravi's mother
- Vajramuni as Banjo
- Tiger Prabhakar as Shatranj, Banjo's henchman
- Shivaprakash
- Venkatappa
- Ellappa
- Suryakumar
- Babu
- Thimma Reddy
- Sampath in a cameo
- Papamma as Ratnabai
- Baby Sushma
- Chandru
- Madan
- Peter (dog)

== Soundtrack ==
The music was composed by Upendra Kumar with lyrics by Chi. Udaya Shankar. All the songs composed for the film were received extremely well.

Track listing
No.	Title	Lyrics	Singer(s)	Length
1.	"Sathyabhame"	Chi. Udaya Shankar	Rajkumar	05:11
2.	"Naa Ninna Aase Kande"	Chi. Udaya Shankar	Rajkumar, S. Janaki	04:36
3.	"Idhu Rama Mandira"	Chi. Udaya Shankar	Rajkumar, Sulochana	04:16
4.	"Oh Entha Soundarya Kande"	Chi. Udaya Shankar	Rajkumar	03:35
5.	"Nasu Nagutha"	Chi. Udaya Shankar	Rajkumar	04:29
