= Sampathige Savaal =

Sampathige Saval
- Film poster
- Directed by: A. V. Seshagiri Rao
- Written by: P. B. Dhuttharagi
- Screenplay by: Chi. Udaya Shankar
- Based on: Saahukaara (play) by B. P. Dhuttharagi
- Produced by: A. N. Murthy
- Starring: Rajkumar; Vajramuni; Manjula
- Cinematography: R. Chittibabu
- Edited by: P. Bhaktavatsalam
- Music by: G. K. Venkatesh
- Production company: Padmashree Enterprises
- Distributed by: Padmashree Pictures
- Release date: 1974
- Running time: 148 minutes
- Country: India
- Language: Kannada

Sampathige Savaal ( transl. A Challenge to Wealth) is a 1974 Indian Kannada-language drama film directed by A. V. Seshagiri Rao and produced by A. N. Murthy, based on the play Saahukaara written by P.B.Dhuttharagi. The film stars Rajkumar, Vajramuni and Manjula. The screenplay, dialogues and lyrics for the soundtracks were written by Chi. Udaya Shankar.

The film was a musical blockbuster with all the tracks composed by G. K. Venkatesh considered evergreen hits. Rajkumar became popular as a playback singer with the track Yaare Koogadali from the film which became an instant hit among the audiences. He would then go on to sing regularly for his films.

The film was remade in Telugu in 1975 as Thota Ramudu starring Chalam, in Tamil in 1975 as Pudhu Vellam starring Sivakumar and in Malayalam in 1976 as Themmadi Velappan starring Prem Nazir. - making it the second Kannada movie to be remade in three other South Indian languages after School Master. Manjula reprised her role in both Telugu and Tamil versions - which also marked her debut in both those language.

== Plot ==
The film opens to a woodcutter chopping down a tree. He works for Siddappa (Vajramuni), a village landlord. The tree breaks at the stem and falls on him, killing him instantly. His wife Parvathamma (M. V. Rajamma) approaches Siddappa with her two children (Vishwa and Veerabhadra) and requests him to pay for the funeral expenses. Siddappa is however unconcerned and drives them away, which would go on to influence Veerabhadra ("Bhadra") hugely as he grows up. Both the children grow up into hardworking men; but, Vishwa works for Siddappa and stays in his good books while Bhadra grows into an easy going man with scant respect for Siddappa.

Vishwa requests Siddappa for financial help as the day of his wedding approaches. Siddappa lends him ₹1,000. Vishwa marries Mahalakshmi. Bhadra, on the other hand, angers Siddappa, his daughter Durga (Manjula) and his accountant Puttappa (Balakrishna) at every opportunity he gets. He humiliates Siddappa in front of the village gathering at a festival, which does not sit well with the latter. On another occasion, he cuts a few strands of Durga's hair using a sickle. Siddappa reports the matter to Bhadra's mother and brother stating that Bhadra had molested his daughter Durga. Enraged, Vishwa drives Bhadra out of their house. Bhadra enters Siddappa's house and threatens to really molest Durga in his presence. He however exits leaving her unharmed.

He stays at the village temple nearby. One day, his mother falls sick and expresses her desire to see him. Mahalakshmi proceeds to the temple to bring him home and takes a circuitous route through the forest. Siddappa, who is passing by, sees her and attempts to molest her. Her screams alert Bhadra who gets into a fist fight with Siddappa, ending in beating him black and blue. As a new marriage proposal for Durga comes, she confesses to her father her romantic feelings toward Bhadra. An enraged Siddappa slaps her on the face following which she runs to Bhadra at the temple and confesses her feelings to him, who initially reluctant, reciprocates them. Hearing the news, Siddappa sends Vishwa to threaten him with a revolver, claiming it to be unloaded, but unbeknownst to Vishwa, having loaded it beforehand with a single bullet. Mahalakshmi reaches the spot as an argument ensues between the two brothers. As she attempts to save Bhadra from the bullet fired by an unsuspecting Vishwa, she gets hit on her left shoulder. Enraged, Bhadra pursues Siddappa and gets into another fist fight with him. As he is about to strike him with an axe, the police arrive on the scene and arrest Siddappa for culpable homicide. Siddappa, before leaving, hands his daughter over to Bhadra.

== Cast ==
- Rajkumar as Veerabhadra (Bhadra)
- Manjula as Durga
- Vajramuni as Sahukar Siddappa, Durga's father
- Balakrishna as Puttappa
- M. V. Rajamma as Parvathi, Bhadra's mother
- Raja Shankar as Vishwa, Bhadra's brother
- C. K. Kalavathi as Mahalakshmi, Vishwa's wife
- H. R. Shastry as priest at temple
- Joker Shyam as Umapathi, Puttappa's son
- B. Jaya as Subbalakshmi, Umapathi's wife
- M. S. Sathya as Kittappa
- B. Hanumanthachar
- Shani Mahadevappa
- Jayamma
- Suryakumari
- Comedian Guggu as Chennajja
- Tiptur Siddaramaiah
- Narayan
- Ellappa
- Master Hemachandra
- Master Bharath
- Cudavalli Chandrashekar in a cameo appearance
- Harshavardhan Rao in a cameo appearance

== Production ==
After many attempts to adapt B. P. Dhuttharagi's play Saahukaara into a film had previously failed, producer Parvathamma Rajkumar became interested. She asked screenwriter and Rajkumar's frequent collaborator Chi. Udayashankar to watch the play that was staged in Kanakapura during the time and report his view to her. Happy with the plot, the two proceed to go ahead with the project and having Rajkumar play the leading man; Udayashankar wrote the screenplay.

Upon Rajkumar's insistence, Vajramuni was cast in the role of Siddappa, the landlord. Director A. V. Seshagiri Rao, who was initially adamant on having Jayanthi as the female lead, relented after Rajkumar suggested that Manjula would be a better choice. The entirety of filming took place in Gajanur, a village in Tamil Nadu, where Rajkumar was born. The makers were unhappy with certain sequences on the film during the post-production stage leading them to reshoot those sequences again there.

The song "Yaare Koogadali" was originally intended to be sung by P. B. Sreenivas. However, his unavailability led composer G. K. Venkatesh suggest that Rajkumar sing it. Rajkumar went on to become a full-fledged playback singer after this. It was picturised on Rajkumar who is seated on a buffalo through most of the song.

== Soundtrack ==
The background score on the film and music for the soundtrack was scored by G. K. Venkatesh with lyrics for the soundtrack written by Chi. Udaya Shankar and R. N. Jayagopal.

Track listing
No.	Title	Lyrics	Singer(s)	Length
1.	"Naguvudo Aluvudo"	Chi. Udaya Shankar	P. B. Sreenivas
2.	"Raja Muddu Raja"	Chi. Udaya Shankar	P. B. Sreenivas, S. Janaki
3.	"Anthinta Hennu"	R. N. Jayagopal	S. Janaki
4.	"Yaare Koogadali"	Chi. Udaya Shankar	Rajkumar
