= Putani Agent 123 =

- VCD cover
- Directed by: Geethapriya
- Screenplay by: H. V. Subba Rao
- Produced by: M. K. Balaji Singh and others
- Starring: Master Ramakrishna Hegde; Master Bhanu Prakash; Baby Indira
- Cinematography: P. S. Prakash; Kulashekar
- Edited by: K. Balu
- Music by: Rajan–Nagendra
- Distributed by: Varuna Films
- Release date: 13 March 1979
- Running time: 114 minutes
- Country: India
- Language: Kannada

Putani Agent 123 is a 1979 Indian Kannada-language children's film directed by Geethapriya. Master Rama Krishna Hegde and Master Bhanu Prakash play the lead roles, alongside the popular pairing of Srinath-Manjula. The film is regularly screened at children's film festivals. It was also dubbed in Hindi as Agent 123.

== Cast ==
- Srinath
- Manjula
- Ambareesh
- Master Ramakrishna Hegde
- Master Bhanu Prakash
- Baby Indira
- Udaya Kumar
- Shakti Prasad
- Sundar Krishna Urs
- Tiger Prabhakar
- M. S. Umesh

== Soundtrack ==
- "Putaani Agent 123" – S. P. Balasubrahmanyam, S. Janaki, Rajeshwari
- "Yeno Santhosha" – S. P. Balasubrahmanyam, S. Janaki
- "Sahyaadri Saalinale" – S. Janaki
