= Sose Tanda Soubhagya =

- Directed by: A. V. Sheshagiri Rao
- Written by: P. B. Duttaragi; Dialogues: K. R. Seetharam; Govinda Swamy; Shivaraj
- Screenplay by: Puttanna Kanagal
- Based on: Chikka Sose (Drama) by P. B. Duttaragi
- Produced by: S. D. Ankalagi; B. H. Chandannavar; M. G. Hublikar; Surendra Ingale
- Starring: Vishnuvardhan; Manjula; Rajesh; Vijaya Lalitha; Vajramuni
- Cinematography: Annayya; L. Mallik
- Edited by: S. P. N. Krishna
- Music by: G. K. Venkatesh
- Distributed by: Bhuvaneshwari Arts Productions
- Release date: 12 April 1977
- Running time: 170 Min.
- Country: India
- Language: Kannada

Sose Tanda Soubhagya is a 1977 Kannada film written by P. B. Duttaragi, directed by A. V. Sheshagiri Rao, starring Vishnuvardhan and Manjula. It is the first CinemaScope movie made in Kannada.

== Plot ==
This is the story of two women who become the daughters-in-law of the same family. One of them is determined to divide the family and the other wishes to unite them.

== Cast ==
- Vishnuvardhan as Shekar
- Manjula as Geetha
- Rajesh as Ravi
- Vijaya Lalitha as Nagaveni (voice dubbed by B. Jayashree)
- Vajramuni as Karigowda
- Balakrishna
- K. S. Ashwath as Ramappa
- Dwarakish as Dathatreya "Dathu"
- Uma Shivakumar as Parvathamma
- M. Jayashree
- Rekha
- Naveena
- Prema
- Ramachandra Naidu
- Jyothishree
- Cudavalli Chandrashekar as Shankar
- Kalavathi
- VanajasShree
- Dinesh in Guest Appearance

== Production ==
It was the first Kannada film whose promotions were handled by a PRO based company Sri Raghavendra Chitravani.

== Soundtrack ==
Soundtrack was composed by G. K. Venkatesh. The song "Ravi Varmana" became a cult classic. Venkatesh later reused this tune in Telugu as "Ravivarmake Andani" for Ravanude Ramudayithe? and in Tamil as "Neraagave" for Nenjil Oru Mull. The song was later remixed in Buddhivanta (2008).

Track list
| No. | Title | Lyrics | Artist(s) | Length |
|---|---|---|---|---|
| 1. | "Saaku Ennuvane" | Vijaya Naarasimha | S. P. Balasubrahmanyam | 4:42 |
| 2. | "Atthige Thangi Ninna Aata" | Chi. Udaya Shankar | S. P. Balasubrahmanyam, S. Janaki | 5:14 |
| 3. | "Ravivarmana Kunchada Kale" | R. N. Jayagopal | P. B. Sreenivas, S. Janaki | 4:19 |
| 4. | "O Henne Nillu Nillu" | Chi Udayashankar | S. P. Balasubrahmanyam | 3:30 |
| 5. | "Eke Avasaravu Helu" | Chi Udayashankar | S. Janaki | 3:58 |
| 6. | "Dhesha Dheshadolage" | Vijaya Naarasimha | S. P. Balasubrahmanyam, S. Janaki | 5:24 |
