= Bhoomige Banda Bhagavantha =

- DVD cover
- Directed by: K. S. L. Swamy (Ravee)
- Written by: Gopala Naidu
- Screenplay by: Narendra Babu
- Produced by: S. P. Varadaraj; J. Chandulal Jain
- Starring: Lokesh; Lakshmi; Jai Jagadish; Vajramuni
- Cinematography: B. Purushottham
- Edited by: Yadav Victor
- Music by: G. K. Venkatesh
- Production company: Jain Movies
- Distributed by: Jain Movies
- Release date: 3 August 1981
- Country: India
- Language: Kannada

Bhoomige Banda Bhagavantha is a 1981 Indian Kannada-language film, directed by K. S. L. Swamy (Ravee) and produced by S. P. Varadaraj and J. Chandulal Jain. The film stars Lokesh, Lakshmi, Jai Jagadish and Vajramuni. The film has musical score by G. K. Venkatesh. The movie was dubbed in Telugu.

== Cast ==
- Lokesh as Ranga
- Lakshmi as Ganga
- Jai Jagadish as Chandra
- Rojaramani as Cheluvi
- Vajramuni as Betta
- C. R. Simha as Gurugalu
- M. S. Umesh as Peepayi Soma
- Leelavathi in a guest appearance as Chandra's mother
- K. S. Ashwath in a guest Appearance as Ganga's father
- Dinesh in Guest Appearance
- Sundara Krishna Urs in a guest appearance as Venkanna
- Chethan Ramarao in a guest appearance as Sadhu
- Rajanand in a guest Appearance
- Thyagaraj Urs in a guest Appearance
- Master Lohith aka Puneeth Rajkumar as Krishna

== Soundtrack ==
The music was composed by G. K. Venkatesh.

No.	Song	Singers	Lyrics	Length (m:ss)
1	"Bhoomige Banda"	S. P. Balasubrahmanyam, S. Janaki	Chi. Udaya Shankar	06:38
2	"Kasturi Thilakavu"	Vani Jairam	Chi. Udaya Shankar	01:37
3	"Nagauvenu"	S. Janaki, Vani Jairam	Chi. Udaya Shankar	04:45
4	"Baara"	Vani Jairam	Chi. Udaya Shankar	04:30
5	"Baalina Sutthalu"	C. Ashwath	Chi. Udaya Shankar	04:27
