= Pramila Joshai =

Indian actress in the Kannada film industry

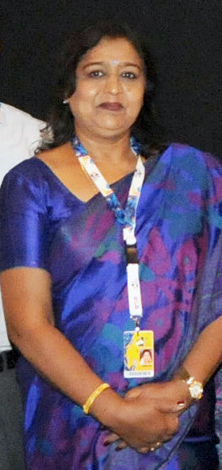
- Pramila Joshai, IFFI (2016)
- Occupation: Film actress
- Years active: 1976–present
- Spouse: Sundar Raj
- Children: Meghana Raj (Daughter)
- Relatives: Chiranjeevi Sarja (Son-in-law) (d. 2020)

Pramila Joshai is an Indian actress in the Kannada film industry. Some of the films of Pramila Joshai as an actor include Saheba (2017), Thayi (2008), Apthamitra (2004). She was credited as Parimalam in her second Tamil film Vaidehi Kathirunthal (1984) which became a blockbuster hit and has attained cult status over the years.

== Awards ==
Year	Award	Film	Credits	Category	Result	Ref
2005	National Film Awards	Thaayi	Producer, Actress	Best Feature Film in Kannada and Best Lyrics	Won	
2005-06	Karnataka State Film Awards	Thaayi	Producer, Actress	Special Film of Social Concern	Won	
1980-81	Karnataka State Film Awards	Sangeetha	Actress	Best Supporting Actress	Won	

== Career ==
Pramila Joshai has been part of more than 120 movies in Kannada.

== Personal life ==
Pramila Joshai is married to Sundar Raj, and they have a daughter named Meghana Raj. Both Sundar Raj and Meghana Raj are Indian film actors in the Kannada film industry, while Meghana has worked in Malayalam, Telugu, Kannada and Tamil films.

Pramila Joshai is a Catholic.

== Selected filmography ==
=== Kannada ===
- Premada Kanike (1976) (credited as Pushpa)
- Kanasu Nanasu (1976)...Rani
- Thayigintha Devarilla (1977)
- Thappida Thala (1978)
- Vijay Vikram (1979)
- Preethi Madu Thamashe Nodu (1979)...Maayi
- Haddina Kannu (1980)...Chenni
- Bangarada Jinke (1980)...Komali
- Mutthaide Bhagya (1983)
- Thaliya Bhagya (1984)...Sharada
- Lakshmi Kataksha (1985)...Seetalakshmi
- Shubha Milana (1987)
- Avane Nanna Ganda (1989)...Vyjayanthimala
- Prathama Ushakirana (1990)...Seeta
- Chirabandhavya (1993)
- Kotreshi Kanasu (1994)
- Bhairava (1994)
- Annavra Makkalu (1996)
- Hagalu Vesha (2000)
- Apthamitra (2004)...Rukmini
- Chamkaisi Chindi Udaysi (2009)
- Bahuparak (2017)
- Amruthamathi (2025).....Chandramathi

=== Tamil ===
- Thappu Thalangal (1978)
- Vaidehi Kathirunthal (1984) (credited as Parimalam)...Vaidehi
- Engalukkum Kaalam Varum (2001)...Baagiyam

== See also ==
- List of people from Karnataka
- Cinema of Karnataka
- List of Indian actresses
- Cinema of India
