= Vajramuni =

Indian Kannada-language actor (1944–2006)

- Born: Sadananda Sagar; 10 May 1944; Kanakanapalya, Jayanagar, Bangalore, Kingdom of Mysore
- Died: 5 January 2006 (aged 61); Bangalore, India
- Occupation: Actor
- Spouse: Lakshmi (m. 1967)
- Children: 3

Sadananda Sagar (10 May 1944 – 5 January 2006), better known by his stage name Vajramuni, was an Indian actor who appeared in Kannada films. He portrayed negative characters during most of his career and was considered one of Kannada cinema's finest actors. Over his career, he came to be known for his "thundering voice and sterling performance[s]" that earned him the epithets, Nata Bhairava and Nata Bhayankara.

Vajramuni began his career as a stage actor and gained popularity with his portrayal of Ravana in Kanagal Prabhakar Shastri's play Prachanda Ravana. He made his film debut in 1969 with Puttanna Kanagal's Mallammana Pavada. His pairing with Rajkumar, with the latter as the lead, in the 1970s came to be widely appreciated, with films such as Sipayi Ramu (1972), Sampathige Savaal (1974), Premada Kanike (1976), Bahaddur Gandu (1976), Giri Kanye (1977) and Shankar Guru (1978). Recognizing his contribution to Kannada cinema, he was awarded the Lifetime Contribution to Kannada Cinema Award in 2006.

== Early life ==
Vajramuni was born as Sadananda Sagar on 10 May 1944 in the Kanakanapalya, a locality in the Jayanagar neighbourhood of Bangalore, into a Vokkaliga family. He was named after the Hindu deity Vajramuneshwara, that members of his family were devotees of. They belonged to the Hallikar community, known for cattle rearing and agriculture. Vajramuni's ancestors were given land grants and made custodians of the village of Anjanapura (in present-day Bangalore Urban district) by the then Maharaja of Mysore, and the family had settled there since. Vajramuni was the eldest of seven children. His father R. Vajrappa (d. 1986) was a politician and served as a corporator in Bangalore for four terms between 1958 and 1968. Politician and educationist Dayananda Sagar (1922–1982) was his uncle.

== Career ==
Vajramuni was a college dropout and held a degree in cinematography. A product of the Kannada amateur theatre, he performed regularly in the mid-1960s for Gubbi Veeranna's theatre company among others. He impressed Puttanna Kanagal with his performance as Ravana in Kanagal Prabhakar Shastri's play Prachanda Ravana who offered Vajramuni a role in the film Savira Mettilu. The film however got shelved, but was completed by K. S. L. Swamy and released in 2006. Kanagal eventually cast him in Mallammana Pavada (1969), which would become Vajramuni's first release. Producers insisted that Udaykumar would be a better choice to match to Shivaji Ganeshan who played the role in the Tamil version, but Puttanna insisted that it had to be Vajramuni. He went on to cast Vajramuni again in Gejje Pooje (1969). Impressed by his performances in these two films, director S. Siddalingaiah cast him in his 1971 film, Thayi Devaru.

Vajramuni acted in a number of films such as Mayura, Sampathige Saval, Daari Tappida Maga, Premada Kanike, Giri Kanye, Shankar Guru and Aakasmika with Rajkumar.

== Personal life ==
Vajramuni was married to Lakshmi, daughter of a family friend, on 28 May 1967. During the time, he worked as a caretaker of the family's sawmill while also performing on stage. They had three sons together.

Vajramuni's health condition worsened starting 1998 when he began suffering from kidney-related illness. Deteriorating health due multiple diseases including chronic diabetes led to his death at 5:30 a.m. (IST) on 5 January 2006, at a private hospital in Bangalore. His grandson is a child actor and has appeared in the television series, Uge Uge Maadeshwara.

== Partial filmography ==
Year	Film	Role	Notes
1969	Mallammana Pavaada	Suryakanth	
1969	Gejje Pooje	Gangaiah	
1970	Aliya Geliya	Shankar	
1971	Thayi Devaru	Somanna	
1971	Sipayi Ramu	Sudhakar	
1971	Nyayave Devaru	Vajramuni	
1971	Sakshatkara	Naganna	
1972	Bangaarada Manushya	Keshava	
1972	Naagarahaavu	Laxmu	
1972	Kulla Agent 000		
1972	Kranti Veera		
1972	Bhale Huchcha	Giri	
1973	Bidugade	Gopal	
1973	Mooroovare Vajragalu	Duryodhana	
1973	Bangaarada Panjara		
1974	Bhakta Kumbara	Krishna	
1974	Upasane	Neelakantaiah	
1974	Sampathige Saval	Siddappa	
1974	Sri Srinivasa Kalyana	Bhrigu	
1975	Mayura	Vishnugopa	
1975	Daari Tappida Maga	Ashok	
1975	Kalla Kulla	Sukumar	
1976	Premada Kanike	Chandru	
1976	Bangarada Gudi	Rayappa "Rama Rao" / Johnny Roy	
1976	Bahaddur Gandu	Crown Prince	
1976	Baduku Bangaaravayithu		
1976	Badavara Bandhu	Gopinatha	
1976	Aparadhi		
1977	Babruvahana	Vrishaketu	
1977	Srimanthana Magalu		
1977	Sose Tanda Soubhagya	Karigowda	
1977	Giri Kanye	Keshava	
1977	Galate Samsara		
1978	Shankar Guru	Premakumar	
1978	Vasantha Lakshmi		
1978	Sneha Sedu	Rao Saheb	
1978	Siritanakke Savaal	Vishakantha	
1978	Operation Diamond Racket		
1978	Muyyige Muyyi	Gopal	
1978	Madhura Sangama	Vasu	
1978	Kiladi Kittu		
1978	Kiladi Jodi	Venu	
1979	Pakka Kalla	Nagendra	
1979	Balina Guri		
1979	Huliya Haalina Mevu	Bhima	
1979	Nanobba Kalla	Bhaskar	
1980	Maria My Darling	Raja	
1980	Kaalinga	"Lion" Dayanand	
1980	Ravichandra	Banjo	
1980	Point Parimala		
1980	Pattanakke Banda Pathniyaru	Mangesh Bhai	
1981	Bhoomige Banda Bhagavantha	Guruji	
1981	Jivakke Jiva		
1981	Antha	Ajab Singh	
1981	Bhaari Bharjari Bete	Daanu	
1982	Garuda Rekhe		
1982	Oorige Upakari		
1982	Karmika Kallanalla		
1982	Jimmy Gallu		
1982	Sahasa Simha	Shankarlal / Dheerajlal	
1982	Nanna Devaru	Actor	
1982	Khadeema Kallaru		
1982	Mareyalagada Kathe	Arjun	
1983	Onde Guri	Motorcycle gang member	
1983	Chandi Chamundi	Diwakar	
1983	Chakravyuha	Bhupathi	
1983	Benkiya Bale		
1983	Hasida Hebbuli	Landlord	
1983	Geluvu Nannade	Dharma Das	
1983	Nagabekamma Nagabeku		
1983	Muthaide Bhagya	Alexander	
1983	Thirugu Baana		
1984	Taaliya Bhaagya		
1984	Premigala Saval	Jagdish	
1984	Vigneshwarana Vahana	Inspector Shankar	
1984	Madhuve Madu Tamashe Nodu	Rahim	
1984	Huliyada Kala	Jailer Mariyappa	
1984	Gandu Bherunda	Mark Abraham	
1984	Gajendra		
1984	Chanakya		
1984	Apoorva Sangama	Dhanraj / Rao Bahadur Saheb	
1984	Prema Sakshi		
1984	Male Banthu Male		
1984	Thaliya Bhagya	Parameshwaraiah	
1984	Kalinga Sarpa	Subramanya	
1985	Veeradhi Veera		
1985	Vajra Mushti	Dharmaraj	
1985	Thayi Mamathe		
1985	Nanna Prathigne	Vishakantaiah	
1985	Kumkuma Thanda Saubhagya	Satyamurthy	
1985	Maruthi Mahime		
1985	Chaduranga	Bheemaraju	
1986	Katha Nayaka		
1986	Bettada Thayi		
1986	Brahmastra	Jaisimha	
1986	Bete		
1986	Preethi	Rajashekhar	
1986	Satkaara		
1987	Sathyam Shivam Sundaram	Mahabala Rao	
1987	Athiratha Maharatha	Vikramraj	
1987	Jayasimha	Punyakoti	
1987	Digvijaya	Vikram	
1987	Asha		
1987	Thaliya Aane		
1987	Lorry Driver	Nagendra	
1987	Sangliyana	Nagappa	
1988	Nee Nanna Daiva	Vasu Rao	
1988	Vijaya Khadga	Balwanth	
1988	Thaayi Karulu		
1989	Yuga Purusha	Anthony D'Costa	
1989	Rudra		
1989	C.B.I. Shankar	Narayana Gowda	
1989	Onti Salaga	Rudraiah	
1989	Hongkongnalli Agent Amar		
1990	Ranabheri	Chalapathi Rao "Kalinga"	
1990	Raja Kempu Roja		
1990	Khiladi Tata		
1990	Prathap	Mamgya	
1991	Police Matthu Dada	Nageshwar Rao	
1991	Kaliyuga Bheema	Baladeva Raj	
1991	Durgashtami		
1991	Gowri Kalyana		
1992	Purushotthama		
1992	Rajadhi Raja		
1992	Mysore Jaana	Mohan Raj	
1992	Halli Krishna Delhi Radha		
1992	Sahasi		
1992	Hosa Kalla Hale Kulla		
1992	Kanasina Rani	Sadananda	
1992	Mannina Doni	Bernard / Ramayya	Dual identity role
1993	Aakasmika	Vyasaraya	
1993	Sri Devi Mookambika		
1993	Rayaru Bandaru Mavana Manege	Police officer	
1993	Mahendra Varma	Major D'Souza	
1993	Jana Mecchida Maga		
1993	Kollura Sri Mookambika	Mookasura	
1993	Bhagavan Sri Saibaba	Nana Chandorkar	
1993	Jailor Jagannath	Mohan Raj	
1994	Lockup Death	Venkataramayya	
1994	Odahuttidavaru	Rudrayya	
1994	Bhairava		
1994	Prem Path		
1994	Musuku		
1994	Mister Mahesh Kumar	Rao Bahadur Raja Rao	
1996	Karnataka Suputra		
1996	Circle Inspector	K. Soma Shekar	
1996	Paalegara	Venkatappa Nayaka	
1997	Simhada Mari	Bhupathi	
1998	Daayaadi		

== Awards ==
Karnataka State Film Awards

- 1982–83: Best Supporting Actor — Bettale Seve
- 2005: Lifetime Contribution to Kannada Cinema Award
