= Kunigal Ramanath =

Indian Kannada actor

Kunigal Ramanath (1932/3 – 1 February 2016) was an Indian Kannada actor, known for Ranganayaki (1981). He also acted in several other movies like Prana Snehitha. He died on 1 February 2016 at the age of 83.
