= Srinath (Kannada actor) =

Indian Kannada actor (born 1943)

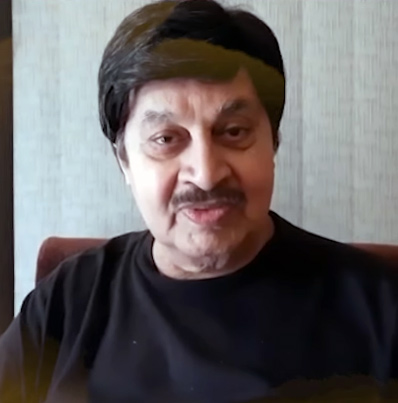
- Born: Narayana Swamy; 28 December 1943 (age 82); Mysore, Kingdom of Mysore, British India
- Occupations: Actor, film producer, television presenter
- Years active: 1967–present
- Spouse: Geetha (m. 1972)
- Children: 2
- Family: C. R. Simha (brother)

Narayana Swamy (born 28 December 1943), known by his stage name Srinath, is an Indian actor and film producer who works predominantly in Kannada cinema. He is vice-president of the Kannada television channel Udaya TV. He is known for presenting the Game Show, Adarsha Dampatigalu (Kannada: ಆದರ್ಶ ದಂಪತಿಗಳು). Srinath has earned the nickname Pranaya Raja meaning 'King of Romance' because of his stupendous success in romantic movies during the 1970s. In 2003, he was conferred the ‛Kalaratna’ Award by the Government of Karnataka.

== Early life ==
Narayana Swamy was born on 28 December 1943 to Ramaswamy Shastri and Lalita in Mysore, in the Kingdom of Mysore of India. Initially, he acted in amateur plays and practiced cinematography in Occupational Institute in Bangalore. He entered films with a small role in the Kannada movie Lagna Pathrike. After that, he got a chance to play the main role in a film called Madhura Milana and his name was changed to Srinath. In 1975 the stupendous success of the cult movie Shubhamangala by Puttanna Kanagal made him a popular hero in Kannada cinema.

== Career ==
=== Film and television ===
Srinath has acted in over 350 films. Shubhamangala is his biggest hit. He has won the State award as best actor for Sri Raghavendra Vaibhava and the Filmfare award for Besuge. In 1982 he had produced Maanasa Sarovara for his mentor Puttanna Kanagal. Srinath was also preparing to direct a Kannada movie. He formed a popular pair with top actress Manjula with whom he acted in a record 35 films during the 1970s and 80s.

Srinath was the Vice President of the Udaya TV Kannada Channel and hosted the Game Show Adarsha Dampatigalu. He still continues to act in films and TV serials.

=== Politics ===
Srinath was nominated by Bharatiya Janata Party as member of legislative council from the artiste fraternity for a period of six years.

== Awards and honours ==
In the year of 1980-81 he was honored by the Karnataka State Film Award for Best Actor for his effective portrayal of the role of Raghavendra in the movie Sri Raghavendra Vaibhava. In year 2003, Srinath was honoured with the Kalaratna (Gem of Art) award by Adarsha Suguma Sangeeta Academy Trust, in Bangalore. The award was honoured by S.M. Shankar, the brother of S.M. Krishna, the then Chief Minister of Karnataka. In the same year, Srinath was honoured with the prestigious Karnataka Rajyotsava Award given by the Government of Karnataka. Then in 2013 Karnataka State Film Awards, he's honored by the prestigious Dr. Rajkumar Award for his lifetime achievement to Kannada Cinema. After completing 100 films he was given the title "Abhinaya Chakravarthy"in 1982. He is also a recipient of Filmfare Lifetime Achievement Award – South in 2024.

== Personal life ==
Srinath is the younger brother of renowned Kannada theatre artist as well as film actor and writer C. R. Simha. Srinath is married to Geetha Srinath. The couple have two children, a son and a daughter. His son Rohit has acted in several Kannada movies as a child artist. His daughter Amulya currently lives in the U.S. with her husband and three daughters.

== Social work ==
Srinath has set up a charitable trust called Deeya Art Foundation to provide a helping-hand to the poor and needy who are affected by diseases like cancer, HIV and heart-related ailments. Among the objectives of the foundation are organising entertainment programs exclusively for cancer-affected patients, free health check-up camps, fund-raising camps for the physically handicapped, service activities at old-age homes, blood donation camps, and free supply of medicines and nutritional food.

== Partial filmography ==
Year	Film title	Role	Notes
1967	Lagna Patrike	Stage actor	
1969	Madhura Milana	Sundar	First film as lead
1970	Anireekshita	Somanath	
1970	Boregowda Bangalorige Banda	Raja	
1970	Mooru Mutthugalu		
1970	Modala Rathri	Anand	
1970	Rangamahal Rahasya		
1970	Seetha		
1970	Sukha Samsara		
1970	Takka Bitre Sikka		
1971	Anugraha		
1971	Bhale Adrushtavo Adrushta		
1971	Onde Kula Onde Daiva		
1971	Sri Krishna Rukmini Satyabhama	Narada	
1971	Sharapanjara	Sudheer	Cameo
1971	Samshaya Phala		
1971	Thande Makkalu		
1972	Bangaarada Manushya	Chakrapani	
1972	Bhale Huchcha	Naganna	
1972	Naa Mechida Huduga	N. Gopinath Rao	
1973	Devaru Kotta Thangi	Ramu	
1973	Mooroovare Vajragalu	Krutavarma	
1974	Naanu Balabeku		
1974	Chamundeshwari Mahime		
1975	Ninagagi Naanu		
1975	Mayura	Prince	
1975	Nireekshe		
1975	Shubhamangala	Prabhakar	
1976	Aparadhi		
1976	Baduku Bangaaravaayitu		
1976	Besuge	Venu	Filmfare Award for Best Actor – Kannada
1976	Kanasu Nanasu	Chandrashekhar	
1976	Vijayavani	Raju	
1976	Hudugaatada Hudugi		
1976	Soothrada Bombe	Kaala	
1977	Devara Duddu		
1977	Kakana Kote		
1977	Pavana Ganga	Annayya	
1977	Maagiya Kanasu		
1977	Sri Renukadevi Mahatme		
1978	Madhura Sangama	Gopal	
1978	Vasantha Lakshmi	Ravi	
1978	Kiladi Jodi	Jaggu	
1978	Muyyige Muyyi	Santosh	
1978	Halli Haida		
1979	Akramana		
1979	Dharmasere	Maadhu	
1979	Pakka Kalla		
1979	Preethi Madu Tamashe Nodu		
1979	Putani Agent 123		
1980	Manjina Tere		
1980	Usha Swayamvara	Self	Cameo
1980	Shri Raghavendra Vaibhava		Karnataka State Film Award for Best Actor
1980	Haddina Kannu	Vinod	
1980	Pattanakke Banda Patniyaru		
1980	Rama Parashurama		
1980	Point Parimala		
1981	Koodi Balidare Swarga Sukha		
1981	Shikari		
1981	Etu Eduretu		
1981	Prema Pallavi		
1981	Number 5 Ekka		
1981	Premanubandha		
1981	Hennina Sedu	Surendra	
1982	Adhrushtavanta		
1982	Garuda Rekhe		
1982	Tony	Prasad	
1982	Guna Nodi Hennu Kodu		
1982	Hasyaratna Ramakrishna	Krishnadevaraya	
1982	Maanasa Sarovara	Dr. Anand	
1983	Chandi Chamundi		
1983	Aakrosha		
1983	Dharani Mandala Madhyadolage	Manohar Nayak	
1983	Sri Nanjundeshwara Mahime		
1984	Baddi Bangaramma		
1984	Eradu Rekhegalu		
1984	Gandu Bherunda	Raju	
1984	Samayada Gombe	Sqn Ldr Vinod Kumar	
1984	Pooja Phala	Raju	
1984	Preethi Vatsalya		
1984	Shravana Banthu	Vishwa	
1984	Ajnatavasa		
1984	Yarivanu		
1985	Kumkuma Thanda Sowbhagya	Mohan Kumar	
1985	Mugila Mallige		
1985	Sati Sakkubai		
1986	Mouna Geethe		
1986	Aparadhi Nanalla	Prakash	
1986	Nannavaru		
1986	Saavira Sullu		
1987	Divijaya		
1987	Dance Raja Dance		
1987	Hridaya Pallavi		
1987	Manasa Veene		
1987	Poornachandra		
1987	Daiva Shakti	Raghavendra Swami	Cameo appearance
1988	Sangliyana	Director general of police	
1988	Baalondu Bhavageethe		
1988	Ganda Mane Makkalu		
1988	Vijaya Khadga	ACP Madhav	
1988	Krishna Mechchida Radhe		
1988	Mathru Vatsalya	Srinath	
1989	Padmavyuha		
1989	Idu Saadhya	Ganesh	
1989	Aananthara		
1989	Gagana		
1989	Gajapathi Garvabhanga	Ananthu	
1989	Ade Raaga Ade Haadu		
1990	Ajay Vijay		
1990	Ashwamedha	Dayanand	
1991	Garuda Dhwaja		
1991	Thavarumane Udugore		
1991	Kaliyuga Bheema		
1991	Shanti Kranti	Commissioner of Police	Also starred in Telugu version
1991	Aralida Hoovugalu		
1991	Navataare		
1991	Neenu Nakkare Haalu Sakkare	Pavan Kumar	
1991	SP Bhargavi		
1991	Rowdy & MLA		
1991	Police Matthu Daada		
1991	Mangalya		
1992	Gruhalakshmi		
1992	Sriramachandra		
1992	Malashree Mamashree		
1992	Bharjari Gandu		
1992	Midida Shruthi	Sampath	
1992	Purushotthama		
1993	Vikram	Chandrakanth	
1993	Annayya	Manjunathayya	
1993	Bhagwan Sri Sai Baba	Gangabhava	
1993	Mahendra Varma	Ashok	
1993	Chinnari Mutha		
1993	Karulina Koogu		
1993	Jaga Mechida Huduga	Mohan Rao	
1994	Beda Krishna Ranginaata		
1994	Indrana Gedda Narendra		
1995	Srigandha		
1995	Gadibidi Aliya		
1995	Mana Midiyithu		
1996	Annavra Makkalu		
1997	Korukunna Priyudu		Telugu film
1997	Prema Raga Haadu Gelathi		
1998	Mr. Putsami		
1998	My Dear Tiger	Police Commissioner	
1999	Swasthik		
2000	Yare Nee Abhimani		
2001	Yuvaraja	Vishwanath	
2001	Premakke Sai		
2001	Premi No. 1	Gopinath	
2002	Chandu	Vidya's father	
2002	Dhumm	Varada and Shankar's father	
2002	Manasella Neene	Mohan Rao	
2003	Neenandre Ishta	Prabhu	
2003	Hrudayavantha		
2004	Poorvapara	Sharada's husband	
2004	Nalla	Preethi's father	
2005	Sye	Chakri's father	
2006	Dattha	Shantiveerappa	
2006	Ajay	Padma's father	
2006	Sirivantha	Subbu	
2008	Satya in Love		
2009	Jhossh	Meera's father	
2009	Raam	Raghunath Prasad	
2010	Kiccha Huccha	Aishwarya's father	
2011	Prema Chandrama		
2011	Keratam	Geetha's father	Telugu-Tamil bilingual film
2011	Yuvan	Meena's father	Telugu-Tamil bilingual film
2012	Bhageerathi	Mallanagowda	
2013	Andhar Bahar		
2013	Chandra	Maharaja	
2013	Mandahasa		
2014	Mr. and Mrs. Ramachari	Venkatesh	
2015	Narayana Saw Me		short film; Best Actor Celebrity Appearance - 3rd ISFFB
2016	Suli	Buden Sahab	
2017	Bangara s/o Bangarada Manushya	Physician	Cameo
2019	Muniratna Kurukshetra	Dhritarashtra	
2022	Gaalipata 2	College principal	
2026	Raktha Kashmira	Himself	Special appearance in song

== Television ==
Year	Title	Role	Channel	Note	Ref.
2002	Cheeti Cheeti				
2012–2013	Thyagam	Thirumalai	Sun TV	Tamil serial	
2013–2015	Bangara		Udaya TV		
2013–2014	Anuraga Sangama	Dr. Krishnaprasad	Udaya TV		
2016–2018	Adarsha Dampatigalu	Host	Udaya TV		
2018–2019	Manasa Sarovara	Psychiatrist Dr. Anand	Udaya TV		
2022–present	Jodi No 1	Judge	Zee Kannada		
2023	Farzi	Madhav	Amazon Prime Video	Dubbed for Kannada version; webseries	
