= List of Kannada films of 1984 =

== Top-grossing films ==
Rank	Title	Collection	Ref.
1.	Bandhana	₹4 crore (₹65.95 crore in 2025)	
2.	Apoorva Sangama	₹3.5 crore (₹57.7 crore in 2025)	
3.	Accident	₹3 crore (₹50 crore in 2025)	
4.	Shravana Banthu	₹2.5 crore (₹41.6 crore in 2025)	
5.	Prachanda Kulla	₹2 crore (₹32.48 crore in 2025)	

== List ==
The following is a list of films produced in the Kannada film industry in India in 1984, presented in alphabetical order.

Title	Director	Cast	Music	Reference
Aaradhane	Deepak Balraj	Vishnuvardhan, Geetha, K. S. Ashwath, Shivaram	Kumar	
Accident	Shankar Nag	Shankar Nag, Ananth Nag, Arundhati Nag, Ramesh Bhat	Ilaiyaraaja	
Ajnathavasa	K. Janakiram	Srinath, Aarathi, Jai Jagadish, K. S. Ashwath	Ramesh Naidu	
Amrutha Ghalige	Puttanna Kanagal	Sridhar, Ramakrishna, Padma Vasanthi	Vijaya Bhaskar	
Anubhava	Kashinath	Kashinath, Abhinaya, Umashree, Dinesh	L. Vaidyanathan	
Aparanji	Ravindranath	Rajeev, Doddanna, Jayachitra, Mahalakshmi, Srinivasa Murthy, Rajanikanth	M. Ranga Rao	
Apoorva Sangama	Y. R. Swamy	Rajkumar, Shankar Nag, Ambika, Vajramuni	Upendra Kumar	
Asha Kirana	B. N. Haridas	Shankar Nag, Geetha, Shamili, Sridhar	Satyam	
Avala Antharanga	R. N. Jayagopal	Ashok, Kalyan Kumar, Roopa Devi, Aarathi	M. Ranga Rao	
Baddi Bangaramma	Kommineni	Srinath, Uma Shivakumar, Mahalakshmi, Bhavya, Ramakrishna, Jai Jagadish, Dinesh	K. Chakravarthy	
Bandhana	Rajendra Singh Babu	Vishnuvardhan, Suhasini, Jai Jagadish, Roopa Devi, Dinesh	M. Ranga Rao	
Bedaru Bombe	H. R. Bhargava	Shankar Nag, Jayamala, Roopa Chakravarthy	M. Ranga Rao	
Bekkina Kannu	S. N. Singh	Ramakrishna, K. Vijaya, Aarathi, Ramadevi, Shivaram, Musuri Krishnamurthy	Satyam	
Benki Birugali	Tiptur Raghu	Vishnuvardhan, Shankar Nag, Jayanthi, Jayamala, Jai Jagadish	M. Ranga Rao	
Bilee Gulabi	G. Shivamurthy	Kalyan Kumar, Murali, Aarathi, Roopa Devi, Anuradha	M. Ranga Rao	
Chanakya	V. Somashekar	Vishnuvardhan, Madhavi, Vajramuni, Shivaram	Satyam	
Devalaya	A. R. S. Devar	S. T. Gowdar, Sujata	R. Ratna	
Eradu Rekhegalu	K. Balachander	Srinath, Saritha, Geetha, K. S. Ashwath, Charanraj, Lokanath	M. S. Viswanathan	
Gajendra	V. Somashekar	Ambareesh, Pavitra, Balakrishna	G. K. Venkatesh	
Gandu Bherunda	Rajendra Singh Babu	Vajramuni, Amrish Puri, Ambareesh, Srinath, Shankar Nag	Satyam	
Guru Bhakti	K. N. Chandrashekar Sharma	Kalyan Kumar, B. Saroja Devi, Ambareesh, Jayamalini	G. K. Venkatesh	
Hennina Sowbhagya	T. V. Panchakshari	Lokesh, Ashok, Aarathi, Geetha	Upendra Kumar	
Hosa Itihaasa	D. Rajendra Babu	Tiger Prabhakar, Jayamala, Vajramuni, Mukhyamantri Chandru	Shankar–Ganesh	
Huli Hejje	Ravee	Vishnuvardhan, Vijayalakshmi Singh, Tiger Prabhakar	Vijaya Bhaskar	
Indina Bharatha	T. Krishna	Shankar Nag, Ambika, Shashikala, Mukhyamantri Chandru	K. Chakravarthy	
Indina Ramayana	Raja Chandra	Vishnuvardhan, Gayathri, Tulasi, Leelavathi, Sridhar	Vijay Anand	
Jiddu	D. Rajendra Babu	Tiger Prabhakar, Jayamala, T. N. Balakrishna	G. K. Venkatesh	
Kalinga Sarpa	D. Rajendra Babu	Shankar Nag, Manjula, Vajramuni, Thoogudeepa Srinivas	Rajan–Nagendra	
Kaliyuga	Raja Chandra	Rajesh, Aarathi, Dinesh	G. K. Venkatesh	
Khaidi	K. S. R. Das	Vishnuvardhan, Madhavi, Aarathi, Dheerendra Gopal	K. Chakravarthy	
Madhuve Madu Tamashe Nodu	Sathya	Vishnuvardhan, Aarathi, Mahalakshmi, Dwarakish	Vijay Anand	
Makkaliralavva Mane Thumba	T. S. Nagabharana	Ananth Nag, Lakshmi, Shankar Nag, Gayathri, Ramesh Bhat	G. K. Venkatesh	
Male Banthu Male	P. S. Prakash	Arjun Sarja, Kumari Indira, K. S. Ashwath	G. K. Venkatesh	
Marali Goodige	K. R. Shantaram	Kalyan Kumar, Roopa Devi	Rajan–Nagendra	
Masanada Hoovu	Puttanna Kanagal	Ambareesh, Jayanthi, Aparna	Vijaya Bhaskar	
Mooru Janma	H. R. Bhargava	Ambareesh, Ambika, Anuradha	Rajan–Nagendra	
Mrugaalaya	V. Somashekar	Ambareesh, Geetha, Sudheer, Sundar Krishna Urs	Rajan–Nagendra	
Naane Raja	C. V. Rajendran	V. Ravichandran, Jai Jagadish, Ambareesh, Ambika, M. P. Shankar	Shankar–Ganesh	
Nagabekamma Nagabeku	B. Subba Rao	Shankar Nag, Jayamala, Tulasi, Kalyan Kumar, Ramakrishna	Satyam	
Nagara Mahime	Kallesh	Sundar Krishna Urs, Sripriya, Master Sanjay, Dinesh	Ilayaraaja	
Olave Baduku	K. V. Jayaram	Ananth Nag, Gayathri, Lokanath	M. Ranga Rao	
Olavu Moodidaga	B. Mallesh	Ananth Nag, Lakshmi, Ramakrishna, Dinesh, Leelavathi	Rajan–Nagendra	
Onde Raktha	Sreekumaran Thampi	Ambareesh, Ambika, Sundar Krishna Urs, Mukhyamantri Chandru, Pandari Bai	Rajan–Nagendra	
Onti Dhwani	T. S. Nagabharana	Ambareesh, Jayamala, Lokesh, Manjula	Upendra Kumar	
Pavitra Prema	A. V. Sheshagiri Rao	Shankar Nag, Aarathi, Roopa Devi, Srinivasa Murthy	Vijaya Bhaskar	
Police Papanna	Dasari Narayana Rao	Dwarakish, Udayakumar, Kalyan Kumar, Rani Sudha, Jayamalini	J. V. Raghavulu	
Pooja Phala	Dhananjaya	Srinath, Aarathi, Arjun Sarja, Mahalakshmi	Satyam	
Prachanda Kulla	Prakash P. S	Dwarakish, Vishnuvardhan, Radhika, Silk Smitha	Vijaya Bhaskar	
Pralayanthaka	B. Subba Rao	V. Ravichandran, Bhavya, Jai Jagadish, Mukhyamantri Chandru	Shankar–Ganesh	
Preethi Vathsalya	H. R. Bhargava	Srinath, Aarathi, Tiger Prabhakar	Rajan–Nagendra	
Prema Sakshi	B. Mallesh	Ananth Nag, Sujatha, Poornima	Rajan–Nagendra	
Premave Balina Belaku	A. V. Sheshagiri Rao	Ananth Nag, Aarathi, Jayamala, Srinivasa Murthy	M. Ranga Rao	
Premigala Saval	V. Somashekar	V. Ravichandran, Tiger Prabhakar, Archana	Rajan–Nagendra	
Raktha Tilaka	Joe Simon	Shankar Nag, Jayamala, Tiger Prabhakar, Kanchana	Satyam	
Ramapurada Ravana	Raja Chandra	Ananth Nag, Aarathi, Geetha	Upendra Kumar	
Ravi Moodi Banda	Rangachar	Chandrashekar, Jai Jagadish, Sumithra	Mysore Mohan	
Rowdy Raja	Joe Simon	Ambarish, Sujatha, Sudheer, Thoogudeepa Srinivas	Satyam	
Rudranaga	Mani Murugan	Vishnuvardhan, R. N. Sudarshan, Madhavi, Balakrishna	M. Ranga Rao	
Runamukthalu	Puttanna Kanagal	Bharathi Vishnuvardhan, Ramakrishna, Sundar Krishna Urs, Padma Vasanthi	Vijaya Bhaskar	
Samayada Gombe	Dorai-Bhagavan	Rajkumar, Roopa Devi, Menaka, Shashikala, Kanchana	M. Ranga Rao	
Shapatha	Amrutham	Shankar Nag, Nalini, Ashok	Shankar–Ganesh	
Shiva Kanye	Hunsur Krishnamurthy	Ramakrishna, Madhavi, Roopa Devi	T. G. Lingappa	
Shravana Banthu	Singeetham Srinivasa Rao	Rajkumar, Srinath, Urvashi, K. S. Ashwath	M. Ranga Rao	
Shrungara Maasa	Pattabhirama Reddy	Amol Palekar, Deepa Dhanraj	Rajeev Taranath	
Sidilu	B. Subba Rao	Ambareesh, Geetha, Malathi, Srinath	Satyam	
Sukha Samsarakke 12 Sutragalu	Raja Chandra	Ananth Nag, Gayathri, C. R. Simha	K. Chakravarthy	
Thaliya Bhagya	Vijay	Shankar Nag, Charan Raj, Lakshmi, Vajramuni	Satyam	
Yarivanu	Dorai-Bhagavan	Rajkumar, Roopa Devi, Master Lohith, B. Saroja Devi, Srinath	Rajan–Nagendra	

== See also ==
- Kannada films of 1983
- Kannada films of 1985
