= List of Kannada films of 1983 =

== Top-grossing films ==
Rank	Title	Collection	Ref.
1.	Kaviratna Kalidasa	₹6 crore (₹111.57 crore in 2025)	
2.	Bhakta Prahlada	₹5.5 crore (₹102.27 crore in 2025)	
3.	Nodi Swamy Naavirodu Heege	₹4 crore (₹74.38 crore in 2025)	
4.	Pallavi Anu Pallavi	₹2 crore (₹37.19 crore in 2025)	
5.	Benkiyalli Aralida Hooovu	₹1 crore (₹18.59 crore in 2025)	

== List ==
The following is a list of films produced in the Kannada film industry in India in 1983, presented in alphabetical order.

Title	Director	Cast	Music	Reference
Aakrosha	Tiptur Raghu	Shankar Nag, Srinath, Aarathi, Sujatha, Leelavathi	Satyam	
Aasha	A. T. Raghu	Ambareesh, Arjun Sarja, Nalini, Vajramuni	G. K. Venkatesh	
Ananda Bhairavi	Jandhyala	Girish Karnad, Kanchana	Ramesh Naidu	
Ananda Sagara	Thyagaraj	Master Hirannayya, Aarathi, Srinivasa Murthy, Jai Jagadish, Pramila Joshai, Kumari Indira	Vijaya Bhaskar	
Antharaala	Suresh Heblikar	Suresh Heblikar, Mamatha Rao, Ramesh Bhat	L. Vaidyanathan	
Anveshane	T. S. Nagabharana	Ananth Nag, Smita Patil, Girish Karnad	C. Ashwath	
Avala Neralu	A. T. Raghu	Ambareesh, Ambika, Vajramuni	Vijaya Bhaskar	
Banker Margayya	T. S. Nagabharana	Lokesh, Jayanthi, Master Manjunath	Vijaya Bhaskar	
Benkiya Bale	Dorai-Bhagavan	Ananth Nag, Lakshmi, K. S. Ashwath, Balakrishna	Rajan–Nagendra	Based on novel by Ta. Ra. Su.
Benkiyalli Aralida Hoovu	K. Balachander	Suhasini, Jai Jagadish, Ramakrishna	M. S. Viswanathan	
Bhagyada Lakshmi Baramma	Singeetham Srinivasa Rao	Rajkumar, Madhavi, Balakrishna	Singeetham Srinivasa Rao	
Bhakta Prahlada	Vijay	Rajkumar, Saritha, Ananth Nag, Ambika, Master Lohith, Kanchana, Srinivasa Murthy, Shivaram, Gangadhar, Thoogudeepa Srinivas	T. G. Lingappa	
Chakravyuha	V. Somashekar	Ambareesh, Ambika, V. Ravichandran, Tiger Prabhakar, Vajramuni	Shankar–Ganesh	
Chandi Chamundi	V. Somashekar	Shankar Nag, Jayamala, Tiger Prabhakar, Srinath, Vajramuni	Satyam	
Chinnadantha Maga	K. S. R. Das	Vishnuvardhan, K. R. Vijaya, Madhavi, Kalyan Kumar	Shankar–Ganesh	
Dharani Mandala Madhyadolage	Puttanna Kanagal	Srinath, Padma Vasanthi, Jai Jagadish, Vijayalakshmi Singh, Chandrashekhar	Vijaya Bhaskar	
Dharma Yuddha	A. T. Raghu	Ambareesh, Pooja Saxena, Charanraj, Mukhyamantri Chandru	Shankar–Ganesh	
Eradu Nakshatragalu	Singeetham Srinivasa Rao	Rajkumar, Master Lohith, Ambika, Leelavathi	G. K. Venkatesh	
Gandharvagiri	N. S. Dhananjaya	Vishnuvardhan, Aarathi, Somayajulu, Leelavathi	Upendra Kumar	
Gandugali Rama	H. R. Bhargava	Vishnuvardhan, Madhavi, M. P. Shankar	Satyam	
Gayathri Maduve	B. Mallesh	Ananth Nag, Ambika, Roopa Devi, K. S. Ashwath	Rajan–Nagendra	
Gedda Maga	S. A. Chandrasekhar	Shankar Nag, Aarathi, Madhavi, Dwarakish	K. Chakravarthy	
Geluvu Nannade	S. A. Chandrasekhar	Ambareesh, Tiger Prabhakar, Jayamala, Vajramuni, Dwarakish	T. G. Lingappa	
Hasida Hebbuli	S. A. Chandrasekhar	Ambareesh, Ambika, Vajramuni, Tiger Prabhakar	Satyam	
Hosa Theerpu	Shankar Nag	Ambareesh, Anant Nag, Jayanthi, Jayamala, Manjula	G. K. Venkatesh	
Ibbani Karagithu	K. V. Jayaram	Ananth Nag, Lakshmi, Deepa, K. S. Ashwath	Rajan–Nagendra	
Kaamana Billu	Chi. Dattaraj	Rajkumar, Saritha, Ananth Nag	Upendra Kumar	
Kalluveene Nudiyithu	Tiptur Raghu	Vishnuvardhan, Aarathi, Bhavya, Jayanthi	M. Ranga Rao	
Karune Illada Kanoonu	Ravee	Lokesh, Sripriya, Ashok, Tiger Prabhakar	Shankar–Ganesh	
Kaviratna Kalidasa	Renuka Sharma	Rajkumar, Jaya Pradha, Nalini, Srinivasa Murthy	M. Ranga Rao	
Keralida Hennu	A. V. Sheshagiri Rao	Shankar Nag, Jayanthi, Vijayashanti, Pandari Bai	K. Chakravarthy	
Kranthiyogi Basavanna	Ravi - Purushottam	Aarathi, Bharathi, Manjula, Ashok, Sridhar, Vajramuni	M. Ranga Rao	
Makkale Devaru	R. N. Jayagopal	Ananth Nag, Lakshmi, Sharat Babu, G.R. Vishwanath	Satyam	
Mududida Tavare Aralithu	K. V. Jayaram	Ananth Nag, Lakshmi, Mukhyamantri Chandru, Advani Lakshmi Devi, Musuri Krishnamurthy, Leelavathi	M. Ranga Rao	
Mutthaide Bhagya	K. N. Chandrashekar	Tiger Prabhakar, Aarathi, Sudheer	Vijaya Bhaskar	
Nodi Swamy Navirodhu Heege	Shankar Nag	Shankar Nag, Ananth Nag, Lakshmi, Arundhati Nag, Ramesh Bhat, Master Manjunath	G. K. Venkatesh	
Nyaya Gedditu	Joe Simon	Shankar Nag, Tiger Prabhakar, Jayamala	Ilaiyaraaja	
Onde Guri	H. R. Bhargava	Vishnuvardhan, Madhavi, M. P. Shankar, Tiger Prabhakar, Ramakrishna	Rajan–Nagendra	
Pallavi Anu Pallavi	Mani Ratnam	Anil Kapoor, Lakshmi, Master Rohit, Vikram	Ilaiyaraaja	
Prema Parva	S. Siddalingaiah	Murali, Bhavya	Rajan–Nagendra	
Phaniyamma	Prema Karanth	Ananth Nag, Lavanya, Venugopala, Baby Prathima	B. V. Karanth	
Prema Yuddha	T. S. Nagabharana	Tiger Prabhakar, Arjun Sarja, Jayamala, Preethi	Kalyan Venkatesh	
Samarpane	H. R. Bhargava	Rajeev, Jai Jagadish, Aarathi, K. S. Ashwath	M. Ranga Rao	
Sididedda Sahodara	Joe Simon	Vishnuvardhan, Aarathi, Tiger Prabhakar, Jayamala, Mallika	Satyam	
Simha Gharjane	S. A. Chandrasekhar	Vishnuvardhan, Vijayashanti, Kalyan Kumar, Jai Jagadish	Satyam	
Sri Nanjundeshwara Mahime	Hunsur Krishnamurthy; M S Ramachandra	Srinivasa Murthy, Udaykumar, Srinath, Shakti Prasad, Sundar Krishna Urs, Padmapriya, Srilalitha, Ashalatha	M. Ranga Rao	
Thayiya Nudi	B. Subba Rao	Kalyan Kumar, Aarathi, Ramakrishna, Charan Raj	Satyam	
Thirugu Baana	K. S. R. Das	Ambareesh, Aarathi, Hema Chowdhary, Jayamala, Vajramuni	Satyam	

== See also ==
- Kannada films of 1982
- Kannada films of 1984
