= List of Kannada films of 1982 =

== Top-grossing films ==
Rank	Title	Collection	Ref.
1.	Chalisuva Modagalu	₹4 crore (₹84.25 crore in 2025)	
2.	Sahasa Simha	₹3.5 crore (₹73.71 crore in 2025)	
3.	Maanasa Sarovara	₹2.5 crore (₹52.65 crore in 2025)	
4.	Tony	₹2 crore (₹42.2 crore in 2025)	
5.	Haalu Jenu	₹1 crore (₹21.1 crore in 2025)	

== List ==
The following is a list of films produced in the Kannada film industry in India in 1982, presented in alphabetical order.

Title	Director	Cast	Music
Adhrustavanta	Rajachandra	Dwarakish, Lokesh, Sulakshana, Srinath	K. Chakravarthy
Ajith	V. Somashekar	Ambareesh, Jayamala, Jai Jagadish, Tiger Prabhakar	Satyam
Amara Madhura Prema	P. R. Ramadas Naidu	Suresh Heblikar, Kashinath, Shoba, Padmashree, Ramesh Bhat	L. Vaidyanathan
Andada Aramane	V. Somashekar	Ananth Nag, Varnashree, Sundar Krishna Urs, Jai Jagadish	Upendra Kumar
Antharala	Suresh Heblikar	Suresh Heblikar, Mamatha Rao, Ramesh Bhat, Sundar Krishna Urs	L. Vaidyanathan
Archana	Mani Murugan	Aarathi, Ashok, Lokesh, Rajanand	Rajan–Nagendra
Baadada Hoo	K. V. Jayaram	Ananth Nag, Padmapriya, K. S. Ashwath	Ashwath- Vaidi
Bara	M. S. Sathyu	Ananth Nag, C. R. Simha, Nitin Sethi, Loveleen Madhu	Mysore Ananthaswamy
Bhakta Gnanadeva	Hunsur Krishnamurthy	Jayanthi, Ramakrishna, Srinivasa Murthy	G. K. Venkatesh
Benki Chendu	Mani Murugan	Shankar Nag, Manjula, Vijaya Geetha, Sundar Krishna Urs, K. S. Ashwath	Mysore Mohan
Chalisuva Modagalu	Singeetham Srinivasa Rao	Rajkumar, Ambika, Saritha, K. S. Ashwath, Master Lohith	Rajan–Nagendra
Chellida Raktha	B. Subba Rao	Ashok, Tiger Prabhakar, Manjula, Ramakrishna, Udayakumar	Satyam
Dharma Dari Thappithu	B. Giribabu	Srinath, Shankar Nag, Jayanthi	Ramesh Naidu
Garuda Rekhe	P. S. Prakash	Srinath, Ambika, Madhavi, Tiger Prabhakar, Vajramuni	Satyam
Guna Nodi Hennu Kodu	A. V. Sheshagiri Rao	Srinath, Manjula, Jai Jagadish	M. Ranga Rao
Haalu Jenu	Singeetham Srinivasa Rao	Rajkumar, Madhavi, Roopa Devi	G. K. Venkatesh
Hasyaratna Ramakrishna	B. S. Ranga	Ananth Nag, Srinath, Aarathi	T. G. Lingappa
Hosa Belaku	Dorai–Bhagavan	Rajkumar, Saritha, K. S. Ashwath, Srinivasa Murthy	M. Ranga Rao
Jimmy Gallu	Ravee	Vishnuvardhan, Sripriya, Lokesh	Vijaya Bhaskar
Kalasapurada Hudugaru	V. L. Acharya	M. V. Vasudeva Rao, Sadashiva Brahmavar, Somashekar, Pramila Joshai	M. Ranga Rao
Kampana	V. Rajan	Vittal Kumar, Aparna Narang, D. K. Rajashekar, V. V. Sridhar	Shyam
Kannu Theresida Hennu	Mani Murugan	Ashok, Aarathi, Tiger Prabhakar	M. Ranga Rao
Karmika Kallanalla	K. S. R. Das	Vishnuvardhan, Shankar Nag, Aarathi, Dwarakish, Balakrishna, Dinesh, M. S. Umesh, Shivaram	K. V. Mahadevan
Khadeema Kallaru	Vijay	Ambareesh, V. Ravichandran, Tiger Prabhakar, Jayamala	Shankar–Ganesh
Maanasa Sarovara	Puttanna Kanagal	Srinath, Ramakrishna, Padma Vasanthi, Jai Jagadish, Chandrashekhar	Vijaya Bhaskar
Mullina Gulabi	Vijay	Ananth Nag, Aarathi, Roopa, Jai Jagadish, Tiger Prabhakar, Dinesh	Satyam
Nanna Devaru	B. Mallesh	Ananth Nag, Sujatha, Tiger Prabhakar, Vajramuni	Rajan–Nagendra
Nyaya Ellide	S. A. Chandrasekhar	Shankar Nag, Aarathi, Tiger Prabhakar	K. Chakravarthy
Oorige Upakari	Joe Simon	Vishnuvardhan, Padmapriya	Satyam
Parajitha	Siddalingaiah	Jai Jagadish, Aarathi, Srinivasa Murthy	Rajan–Nagendra
Pedda Gedda	H. R. Bhargava	Dwarakish, Vishnuvardhan, Aarathi, Kanchana	K. V. Mahadevan
Praya Praya Praya	T. S. Nagabharana	Ramakrishna, Vijayalakshmi Singh, Mamatha Rao, Sundar Raj	Upendra Kumar
Prema Mathsara	C. V. Rajendran	Ambareesh, Jayamala, Tiger Prabhakar	Shankar–Ganesh
Raga Thala	H. M. Krishnamurthy	Prithviraj Sagar, Jayamala, Raja Shankar	M. Ranga Rao
Raja Maharaja	Mani Murugan	Ashok, Aarathi	M. Ranga Rao
Sahasa Simha	Joe Simon	Vishnuvardhan, Kajal Kiran, Udaya Kumar, Tiger Prabhakar, Sudheer, Vajramuni, Thoogudeepa Srinivas, Dheerendra Gopal	Satyam
Shankar Sundar	A. T. Raghu	Ambareesh, Dwarakish, Jayamala, Swapna	G. K. Venkatesh
Suvarna Sethuve	Geethapriya	Vishnuvardhan, Aarathi, Dinesh	Vijaya Bhaskar
Tony	H. R. Bhargava	Ambareesh, Lakshmi, Srinath, Tiger Prabhakar, Srilalitha, Shivaram	Rajan–Nagendra

== See also ==
- Kannada films of 1981
- Kannada films of 1983
