= 1984–85 Karnataka State Film Awards =

Annual Indian film awards ceremony

The Karnataka State Film Awards 1984–85 were presented by Government of Karnataka, to felicitate the best of Kannada Cinema released in the year 1984.

== Film awards ==
Name of Award	Film	Producer	Director
First Best Film	Accident	Shankar Nag	Shankar Nag
Second Best Film	Bettada Hoovu	Parvathamma Rajkumar	N. Lakshminarayan
Third Best Film	Marali Goodige	Gurusharanam Films	K. R. Shantaram

== Other awards ==
Name of Award	Film	Awardee(s)
Best Direction	Accident	Shankar Nag
Best Actor	Bandhana	Vishnuvardhan
Best Actress	Avala Antharanga	Roopa Devi
Best Supporting Actor	Avala Antharanga	Shyam Sundar
Best Supporting Actress	Accident	Arundhati Nag
Best Child Actor	Parameshi Prema Prasanga	Manjunath
Best Music Direction	Bandhana	M. Ranga Rao
Best Cinematography	Avala Antharanga	R. N. K. Prasad
Best Editing	Avala Antharanga	B. Hanumantha Rao
Best Sound Recording	Accident	B. Pandurangan
Best Story Writer	Bettada Hoovu	Sherli L. Arora
Best Screenplay	Accident	Vasant Mokashi
Jury's Special Award	Accident	Hasan Raghu (For Accident Sequence)
Jury's Special Award	Beralge Koral	Kanchana Ganga Films (For Effective Adaptation of important play of Rashtrakavi Kuvempu into film)
