= Chalisuva Modagalu =

- Film poster
- Directed by: Singeetham Srinivasa Rao
- Screenplay by: Singeetham Srinivasa Rao; Chi. Udaya Shankar (dialogues)
- Story by: Singeetham Srinivasa Rao
- Produced by: Parvathamma Rajkumar
- Starring: Rajkumar; Ambika; Saritha; Master Lohith
- Cinematography: B. C. Gowrishankar
- Edited by: P. Bhaktavatsalam
- Music by: Rajan–Nagendra
- Production company: Vaishnavi Movies
- Release date: 29 October 1982
- Running time: 157 minutes
- Country: India
- Language: Kannada

Chalisuva Modagalu ( transl. Moving Clouds) is a 1982 Indian Kannada-language film directed by Singeetham Srinivasa Rao. The film stars Rajkumar, Saritha, Ambika and K. S. Ashwath and Puneeth Rajkumar as a child artiste. The film follows a man who has to defend his former lover in court against his wife, who is the public prosecutor.

The movie is well known for its evergreen songs which were composed by the musical duo Rajan–Nagendra. The film was a major success at the box office upon its release. The movie was remade in Telugu in 1983 as Rajakumar starring Sobhan Babu with Ambika reprising her role.

== Plot ==
Mohan is a young, jovial lawyer practicing under his father Vishwanath Rao. At his friend's wedding, Mohan comes across Sheela and develops an instant liking for her. Mohan meets Sheela frequently and befriends her. Soon Sheela also begins liking Mohan. Leela is Vishwanath's niece and a lawyer who is also practicing under Vishwanath. Both the families and Leela want her to marry Mohan. One day all of a sudden Sheela behaves strangely, tells Mohan to forget her and breaks her relationship with him. Soon she is married to her family friend. Unable to take this, Mohan is depressed and falls sick. Leela tends to Mohan at this time. Looking at Leela's selfless service and pure love for him, Mohan agrees to marry her and lives happily with her. One day in the newspaper an article was published about a woman who killed her own husband. Mohan looks into the article and discovers that the woman is none other than Sheela. Mohan decides to take up the case and fight for Sheela as he knew that something was fishy here and that Sheela could never do such a thing. With the help of Murthy and his sister, Mohan gets to know that Sheela, on her way home one evening, was raped by his brother's friend. Feeling that she has spoiled her chastity and is no more fit to marry Mohan, Sheela behaves rudely with him and makes him forget her and later marries the one who raped her.

Now Mohan has to fight the case against his own wife, Leela. Both the lawyers try to prove their points. In one of the following court proceedings, Leela discovers that Mohan is Sheela's ex-lover. Furious Leela asks for a divorce from Mohan to which the latter disagrees. Vishwanath interrupts and explains why Mohan hid the truth from her and makes her realize how much love Mohan has for her. Now Leela too tries to understand from both the sides as to what has happened the night when Sheela's husband was killed. With the help of Ramu, both the lawyers discover that a lady who had been cheated by Sheela's husband had killed him. She accepts her crime and is imprisoned. Sheela is released from the jail. Sheela thanks the couple, Leela tells her that she would name her child Sheela if a girl is born in the future.

== Cast ==
- Dr. Rajkumar as Mohan
- Saritha as Leela
- Ambika as Sheela
- K. S. Ashwath as Vishwanath Rao, Mohan's father
- Pandari Bai as Sheela's mother
- Thoogudeepa Srinivas as Sheela's father
- Thimmaiah as Leela's father
- Papamma as Leela's mother
- Advani Lakshmi Devi as Mohan's mother
- Shringar Nagaraj as Murthy, Mohan's friend
- Honnavalli Krishna
- K. V. Manjayya
- Shani Mahadevappa
- Puneeth Rajkumar as Ramu (credited as Master Lohith)
- Vijay Raghavendra as a child judge in song "My Lord Nanna Vaada" (credited as Master Raghavendra)
- Shivaram as judge
- Mamatha Shenoy

== Soundtrack ==
Chalisuva Modagalu

Soundtrack album by Rajan–Nagendra
- Released: 1982
- Recorded: 1982
- Genre: Feature film soundtrack
- Length: 24:29
- Language: Kannada
- Label: Sangeetha Music
- Director: Rajan–Nagendra

Rajan–Nagendra chronology
| Yava Hoovu Yara Mudigo (1981) | Chalisuva Modagalu (1982) | Archana (1982) |

The music and background score was composed by Rajan–Nagendra and the lyrics were penned by Chi. Udaya Shankar. All the songs were received extremely well and were instant hits. The song "Kaanadante Maayavadanu" was remixed in Anna Bond (2012) starring Puneeth who also sang the remix version.

| Track # | Song | Singer(s) | Length |
|---|---|---|---|
| 1 | "My Lord" | Dr. Rajkumar, S. Janaki | 5:49 |
| 2 | "Neenello Naanalle" | Dr. Rajkumar, S. Janaki | 4:17 |
| 3 | "Kaanadante Maayavadanu" | Master Lohith | 4:55 |
| 4 | "Jenina Holeyo" | Dr. Rajkumar, Sulochana | 4:41 |
| 5 | "Chandira Thanda" | Dr. Rajkumar, S. Janaki | 4:24 |

== Box office ==
Chalisuva Modagalu garnered positive response from the people. The movie was a phenomenal success in A, B and C centres. The movie had a theatrical run of 40 weeks in Hubli and certain other parts of Uttara Karnataka while completed 175 days of run in several other centres. Chalisuva Modagalu became the first movie to complete 100 days theatrical run in two centres in Mysore city where it sold around 2 lakh tickets which would amount to 4 to 4.5 crores at the current rate breaking the previous record of Dr. Rajkumar's Haalu Jenu which had sold 6.5 lakh tickets. The movie completed 100 days of run in all the 16 first release centres and 100 days in Bengaluru. The movie which ran for 85 days in Sampige theatre held the record of longest running movie in that theatre for almost 15 years until the release of Nammoora Mandara Hoove.Chalisuva Modagalu earned a profit of ₹23.75 lakhs within the first five weeks which was the highest for a Rajkumar movie between 1982 and 1984 with Haalu Jenu, Kaviratna Kalidasa and Samayada Gombe being the other top ventures. The movie was an All Time Blockbuster at the box office.

== Awards ==
Karnataka State Film Awards

- Best Child actor - Master Lohith
- Best Sound recording - N. Pandurangan
