= Mududida Tavare Aralithu =

- Directed by: K. V. Jayaram
- Written by: Chitralekha
- Produced by: Kalaniketan
- Starring: Anant Nag; Lakshmi
- Cinematography: S. Ramachandra
- Edited by: P. Bhaktavatsalam
- Music by: M. Ranga Rao
- Production company: Durga Combines
- Release date: 1983
- Running time: 141 minutes
- Country: India
- Language: Kannada

Mududida Tavare Aralithu is a 1983 Indian Kannada-language romantic drama film directed by K. V. Jayaram, based on the novel of the same name by Chitralekha. The film stars Anant Nag, K. S. Ashwath and Lakshmi. This movie was remade in Telugu as Srimathigaru with Murali Mohan and Jayasudha in the lead roles

== Cast ==
- Anant Nag as Chandrashekhar
- Lakshmi as Madhuvanthi (Madhu)
- K. S. Ashwath as Govinda Rao, Madhu's father
- Mukhyamantri Chandru as Madhu's brother
- Mysore Lokesh as Srinivas, Madhu's brother
- Musuri Krishnamurthy as Ranga
- Leelavathi as Madhu's mother
- Advani Lakshmi Devi as Saraswati, Chandrashekhar's mother
- Shobha
- K. N. Bharathi
- Manjula Hiremath
- Sunanda Kadapatti
- Uma Shivakumar
- Dingri Nagaraj

== Soundtrack ==
Music for the film and background score was composed by M. Ranga Rao. All the songs composed for the film were received extremely well and considered evergreen songs.

Track listing
No.	Title	Lyrics	Singer(s)	Length
1.	"Munjane Moodida Haage"	Doddarangegowda	S. P. Balasubrahmanyam
2.	"Aralide Aralide"	Anamika	S. Janaki
3.	"Vivaha Baalige"	Doddarangegowda	S. P. Balasubrahmanyam
4.	"Milana Kaanadu"	Doddarangegowda	S. P. Balasubrahmanyam
5.	"Uriyuthide Hoobana"	Doddarangegowda	S. Janaki
