= Eradu Rekhegalu =

- Directed by: K. Balachander
- Screenplay by: K. Balachander; Ananthu
- Story by: Joseph Anandan
- Produced by: Chandulal Jain; V. Natarajan
- Starring: Srinath; Saritha; Geetha; K. S. Ashwath
- Cinematography: B. S. Lokanath
- Edited by: N. R. Kittu
- Music by: M. S. Viswanathan
- Release date: 1984
- Running time: 149 mins
- Country: India
- Language: Kannada

Eradu Rekhegalu is a 1984 Indian Kannada-language drama film, directed by K. Balachander. The film stars Saritha, Srinath and Geetha. Produced by Chandulal Jain, the film is a remake of 1969 Tamil hit Iru Kodugal. The music was composed by M. S. Viswanathan.

The story revolves around a man who circumstantially gets to marry two women and faces an emotional roller-coaster. The film was made in Telugu as Collector Janaki and in Hindi as Sanjog.

== Cast ==
- Saritha
- Srinath
- Geetha
- K. S. Ashwath
- Lokanath
- Uma Shivakumar
- N. S. Rao
- Shivaram
- Sadashiva Brahmavar

== Soundtrack ==
Eradu Rekhegalu

Soundtrack album by M. S. Viswanathan
- Released: 1984
- Genre: Feature film soundtrack

Track #	Song	Singer(s)	Lyrics
1	"Neela Megha Shyama"	Vani Jairam, P. Susheela	R. N. Jayagopal
2	"Gangeya Kareyalli"	S. P. Balasubrahmanyam, Vani Jairam	R. N. Jayagopal

== External sources ==
- Eradu Rekhegalu at IMDb
