= Nyaya Gedditu =

- Directed by: S. M. Joe Simon
- Written by: M. Narendra Babu (dialogues)
- Screenplay by: S. M. Joe Simon
- Story by: Bhisetty Lakshmana Rao
- Produced by: M. K. Balaji Singh
- Starring: Shankar Nag; Tiger Prabhakar; Jayamala; Aarathi; Roopa
- Cinematography: S. Ramachandra
- Edited by: K. Balu
- Music by: Ilaiyaraaja
- Release date: 8 April 1983
- Running time: 127 min
- Country: India
- Language: Kannada

Nyaya Gedditu (transl. Truth Won) is a 1983 Indian Kannada-language action drama film, directed by S. M. Joe Simon and produced by M. K. Balaji Singh. The film stars Shankar Nag, Tiger Prabhakar, Aarathi and Jayamala. The film has musical score by Ilaiyaraaja.

== Cast ==
- Shankar Nag as Anand
- Tiger Prabhakar as Santosh
- Aarathi as Geetha (extended cameo)
- Jayamala as Rajini
- Roopa Devi as Jyothi
- Upasane Seetharam
- Sadashiva Brahmavar as Dharmayya
- Mico Chandru
- K. V. Manjayya
- I. B. Shankar
- Baba Singh
- P. Nanjundappa
- Shanthamma as Anand's mother
- Prashanthi Nayak
- B. Sharadamma
- Rashmi
- Shankar Singh
- Negro Johnny
- Mukhyamantri Chandru

== Soundtrack ==
The soundtrack of the film was composed by Ilaiyaraaja, with lyrics penned by R. N. Jayagopal, Geetapriya and Chi Udaya Shankar.

Track list
#	Title	Singer(s)	Lyricist
1	"Saavira Janumagalu"	S. P. Balasubrahmanyam, S. Janaki	
2	"Jojo Nanna Kandane"	S. Janaki, Ilaiyaraaja	
3	"Nanagu Ninagu Maduve Aago Kaala"	S. P. Balasubrahmanyam, S. Janaki	
4	"Bangaara Namma Bangaara"	S. P. Balasubrahmanyam, S. Janaki	
