= Bandhana =

- Poster
- Directed by: Rajendra Singh Babu
- Screenplay by: H. V. Subba Rao; Rajendra Singh Babu
- Based on: Bandhana by Usha Navarathnaram
- Produced by: Rajendra Singh Babu
- Starring: Vishnuvardhan; Suhasini; Jai Jagadeesh
- Cinematography: D. V. Rajaram
- Edited by: V. P. Krishna
- Music by: M. Ranga Rao
- Production company: Rohini Pictures
- Release date: 24 August 1984
- Running time: 153 minutes
- Country: India
- Language: Kannada

Bandhana ( transl. Romantic Bond) is a 1984 Indian Kannada-language romantic drama film directed by Rajendra Singh Babu from a screenplay by H. V. Subba Rao and Rajendra Singh Babu, based on a novel of the same name by Usha Navaratnanram. The film revolves around the relationship between a surgeon, Harish and his student Nandini. The film stars Vishuvardhan as Dr. Harish and Suhasini as his protégé Nandini, along with Jai Jagadish, Roopadevi and G. K. Govinda Rao in supporting roles.

At the 32nd National Film Awards, the film was awarded the Best Feature Film in Kannada. The film also won two awards at the 1984 Karnataka State Film Awards: Best Actor for Vishnuvardhan and Best Music Director for M. Ranga Rao. The film was a critical and commercial success and is often regarded as a classic in Kannada cinema. The film was remade in Tamil in 1985 as Prema Paasam. It was dubbed in Telugu as Dr. Nandini. It was also dubbed in Malayalam.

== Plot ==
Harish is a doctor who falls in love with his student, Nandini, but is too shy to express his feelings for her. When he finally musters up courage to tell her that he loves her, she tells him that she holds him in high esteem as her teacher and is unable to reciprocate his romantic feelings.

Nandini marries an engineer, Balu, who is incidentally Harish's friend from his school days. Soon marital problems crop up between Nandini and Balu because of her dedication to her career as a doctor. Harish withdraws into a shell and develops a heart enlargement condition, drawing Nandini closer to him. This further frustrates Balu and he accuses Nandini of having an affair with Harish. Harish tries to convince Balu that his relationship with Nandini is platonic but Balu mistreats him.

When a pregnant Nandini discovers that Balu has assaulted their house help, she decides to leave him. Harish delivers Nandini's child and dies from his advanced heart condition. Nandini divorces her husband and moves on with her new-born child.

== Cast ==
- Vishnuvardhan as Doctor Harish
- Suhasini as Doctor Nandini
- Jai Jagadish as Balu, Nandini's husband
- Roopadevi as a house help
- G. K. Govinda Rao as Chief Doctor
- Kanchana as Harish's mother
- Shivaram as Ward boy
- Mysore Lokesh as Shuklachari's assistant
- Musuri Krishnamurthy as Shuklachari: the village pandit

== Production ==
=== Development ===
Usha Navratnaram's novel was a literary romance that dealt with the inner feelings of the lead characters. When the director of the film came across the novel he saw great potential in the story and wanted to make it into a film.

=== Casting ===
Popular pair Anant Nag and Lakshmi were initially considered for the lead roles. Babu initially considered Ambareesh for the lead role but his dates were not available. Rajendra Singh Babu decided to cast Vishnuvardhan in the Devdas-like role which had never been done in Kannada films before. At first the film industry was skeptical that Vishnuvardhan who was known for action roles was cast for a love story like Bandhana. The director's faith and the way Vishnuvardhan carried the role of Dr. Harish transformed his image and established him as a superstar. The title card pays tribute to actress Kalpana who wanted to play the role of Dr. Nandini. Babu also considered Aarathi for the heroine's role but her date diary was full. When he happened to meet Suhasini with whom his sister Vijayalakshmi Singh was costarring in a movie (Benkiyalli Aralida Hoovu), he immediately decided she would be Dr. Nandini. The negative role portrayed by Jai Jagadish was first offered to veteran actor Ambareesh, who refused the role.

=== Filming ===
The film was shot in several scenic locales such as Lakya Dam, Hanumanagundi Falls, Lalitha Mahal Palace, Krishnarjuna Sagar Dam, Harangi Dam and the Grand Ashok Hotel in Bangalore. Babu also included a Holi song - another first for a Kannada movie and a grand piano song in the movie.

== Soundtrack ==
Bandhana

Soundtrack album by M. Ranga Rao
- Released: 1984
- Recorded: Prasad Studios
- Genre: Feature film soundtrack
- Label: Sangeetha
- Producer: M. Ranga Rao

M. Ranga Rao chronology
Benki Birugali (1984)	Bandhana (1984)	Bedaru Bombe (1984)

M. Ranga Rao composed the soundtrack, and the lyrics were written by R. N. Jayagopal. The album consists of four soundtracks. The track of Banna Nanna Olavina Banna was inspired by the tune of the track Per Qualche Dollaro In Più - Spanish Intro Opening Theme from the 1965 English-language film For a Few Dollars More. The songs of the film were chartbusters.

Tracklist
No.	Title	Lyrics	Singer(s)	Length
1.	"Banna Nanna Olavina"	R. N. Jayagopal	S. P. Balasubrahmanyam, S. Janaki, chorus
2.	"Ee Bandhana"	R. N. Jayagopal	K. J. Yesudas, S. Janaki
3.	"Noorondu Nenapu"	R. N. Jayagopal	S. P. Balasubrahmanyam
4.	"Premada Kadambari"	R. N. Jayagopal	S. P. Balasubrahmanyam

== Release and reception ==
The film was certified with a U certificate on 26 July 1984 without any cuts and was released in theatres on 24 August the same year.

=== Critical response ===
The film garnered widespread critical acclaim. The film was praised for its story, script, direction and soundtrack. The soundtrack of the film is considered one of the greatest in the Kannada film industry. The performance of the lead cast was also appreciated. A film critic from Screen writes: "Babu with his strong command of film-making techniques, effectively adapted the novel into a screenplay rich in visuals and external drama that are required for the medium of cinema. He also showed a penchant for filming on a grander scale like the Hindi movies of the time - be it the Holi song or the prominent presence of the grand piano in the wedding song." Vishnuvardhan's portrayal of Dr. Harish is considered one the best performances of his career. The National Film Archive of India writes in a tweet: "Recognized as among the path-breaking performances of Vishnuvardhan, he mesmerized the audiences with his portrayal of a sacrificial lover."

=== Box office ===
The movie ran for 100 days in 18 theatres and 25 weeks in many first class theatres. The film had a 30 weeks run in two theatres (a record at the time) and completed 469 days of run in one theatre, making the film the second longest running Kannada film in theatres at that time. Bandhana went on to become the highest-grossing film of year and was declared an industry hit.

=== Aftermath ===
After Bandhana's phenomenal success, fans of Rajkumar and Vishnuvardhan started clashing. Babu relocated to Mumbai, and lived there for five years.

== Remake ==
The film was remade in Tamil as Premapasam. The Tamil version released in 1985 and had Sivakumar and Revathi in lead roles. The film was directed by K. Vijayan and had musical score by Gangai Amaran.

== Awards ==
National Film Awards

- National Film award for Best Feature Film in Kannada - Rajendra Singh Babu (Rohini Pictures)

Karnataka State Film Awards

- Best Actor - Vishnuvardhan
- Best Music Director - M. Ranga Rao

Filmfare Awards South

- Special Award For Excellent Performance - Vishnuvardhan

== Legacy ==
In Bandhana, Vishnuvardhan played the role of a shy doctor who fails to express his love to a girl and ends up as a tragic hero by developing a fatal heart condition. The role of Dr. Harish brought him critical appreciation. The success of Bandhana was a turning point in Vishnu's career. He began acting in family-oriented movies like Krishna Nee Begane Baro, Karunamayi, Sowbhagya Lakshmi, Suprabhatha and carved another niche among family audience. The film also made Dr. Vishnuvardhan - Suhasini duo a much celebrated pair onscreen. Following the immense success of Bandhana they acted together in several films like Suprabhatha, Muthina Haara and Himapaata. The song Noorondu Nenapu from this film is now considered an evergreen song and later inspired the title of a 2017 film.
