= Gandandre Gandu =

- Directed by: V. Somashekhar
- Written by: Abdual Muthalif
- Screenplay by: M. D. Sundar
- Produced by: H. N. Maruthi
- Starring: Ambareesh; Nalini; Jai Jagadish; Thoogudeepa Srinivas
- Cinematography: N. R. K. Murthy
- Edited by: K. Balu
- Music by: G. K. Venkatesh
- Production company: Sri Prasanna Lakshmi Combines
- Release date: 3 May 1988
- Country: India
- Language: Kannada

Gandandre Gandu is a 1989 Indian Kannada-language film, directed by V. Somashekar and produced by H. N. Maruthi. The film stars Ambareesh, Nalini, Jai Jagadish and Thoogudeepa Srinivas. The film has musical score by G. K. Venkatesh.

== Cast ==
- Ambareesh
- Nalini
- Jai Jagadish
- Roopadevi
- K. Vijaya
- Thoogudeepa Srinivas
- Dinesh
- Shakti Prasad
- Musuri Krishnamurthy
- Brahmavar
- Prasanna (Prasanna Kumar)
- B. K. Shankar
- Muni Krishnappa
- Guggu
- Shashikala
- Chandrashekar
- Seetharam
- Sathish
- Anand
- Thipatur Siddaramaiah
- Karanth
- Mandeep Roy
- Master Naveen

== Soundtrack ==
The music was composed by G. K. Venkatesh.

No.	Song	Singers	Lyrics	Length (m:ss)
1	"Ba Ba Ba Hejje Haaku"	S. P. Balasubrahmanyam, Vani Jairam	R. N. Jayagopal	04:31
2	"Ee Premada Hosa"	S. P. Balasubrahmanyam, Vani Jairam	R. N. Jayagopal	04:55
3	"Naane Raja Neene Raani"	S. P. Balasubrahmanyam	Chi. Udaya Shankar	05:00
4	"Anna Thammore"	P. Susheela, Sulochana, Rajkumar Bharathi	R. N. Jayagopal	04:27
5	"Manjina Hanigalu"	P. Susheela	R. N. Jayagopal	04:39
