= Indina Bharatha =

- VCD cover
- Directed by: T. Krishna
- Written by: T. Krishna
- Screenplay by: T. Krishna
- Based on: Neti Bharatam (1983)
- Starring: Shankar Nag; Ambika; Mukhyamantri Chandru; Balakrishna
- Cinematography: R. Ramarao
- Music by: Chakravarthy
- Production company: Pragathi Enterprises
- Release date: 20 July 1984
- Country: India
- Language: Kannada

Indina Bharatha is a 1984 Indian Kannada film, directed by T. Krishna. The film stars Shankar Nag, Ambika, Mukhyamantri Chandru and Balakrishna in the lead roles. The film has musical score by Chakravarthy. The film was remake of Telugu film Neti Bharatam (1983).

== Cast ==
- Shankar Nag as Arjun
- Ambika as Bharathi
- Mukhyamantri Chandru as Vishakantaiah
- T. N. Balakrishna
- Shakti Prasad
- Lakshman as doctor
- Dinesh as constable Hanumayya
- Vijay Kashi as Bhaskar
- Ravichandra
- Somu
- Shashikala
- Vijayaranjini
- Rajyalakshmi
- Shanthamma as Bhaskar's mother
- Ashalatha as Sharada
- M. S. Umesh as compounder
- Comedian Guggu as patient
- Sadashiva Brahmavar
- Mysore Lokesh
