= Idu Saadhya =

- Title card
- Directed by: Dinesh Babu
- Written by: Dinesh Babu
- Produced by: Chandulal Jain
- Starring: Anant Nag; Shankar Nag; Prabhakar; Srinath; Devaraj; Ramesh Aravind; Revathi; Disco Shanti; Mahalakshmi; Kavya
- Cinematography: Dinesh Babu
- Edited by: Suresh Urs
- Music by: Vijay Anand
- Production company: Chamundeshwari Studios
- Distributed by: Jain Films
- Release date: 22 August 1989
- Running time: 90 minutes
- Country: India
- Language: Kannada

Idu Saadhya ( transl. This is possible) is a 1989 Indian Kannada-language slasher film directed by Dinesh Babu and produced by Chandulal Jain under Chamundeshwari Studios. The film stars Anant Nag, Shankar Nag, Tiger Prabhakar, Srinath, Devaraj, Ramesh Aravind, Revathi (in her Kannada debut), Disco Shanti, Mahalakshmi, Kavya, and Bheeman Raghu. It is inspired from the 1987 Italian film Stage Fright. The music was composed by Vijay Anand, while cinematography and editing were handled by Dinesh Babu and Suresh Urs.

Idu Saadhya created a world record by becoming the first film to be shot within a span of two days; reports vary between 36 and 48 hours.

== Premise ==
A theater troupe are rehearsing for a project until they get trapped inside a theatre with a mass murderer who goes on a killing spree.

== Cast ==
- Anant Nag as Kyatha / Karthik Kamplapur
- Shankar Nag as theatre director
- Srinath as Ganesh
- Tiger Prabhakar as Muniyappa
- Devaraj as Ravi
- Ramesh Arvind as Dr. Prathap
- Revathi as Indu
- Mahalakshmi as Kavitha
- Kavya (of Inspector Vikram fame) as Asha
- Srividya as hospital patient
- Disco Shanti as Chithra
- Anjali Sudhakar as nurse
- Mukhyamantri Chandru as police constable
- Bheeman Raghu as psycho killer "Goobe"
- Ramesh Bhat as constable Ranga
- Doddanna as constable Sannamani

== Music ==
The music was composed by Vijay Anand.

- "Joke Nee" – Alisha Chinai, B. R. Chaya, Dheena Chandra Dhas (English Rap) (uncredited)
- "Kanni Nalle" – Alisha Chinai, K. S. Chithra

== Awards ==
- Cinema Express Award for Best Director – Dinesh Babu
