= Hosa Theerpu =

- Directed by: Shankar Nag
- Screenplay by: Shankar Nag; Virendra Sinha
- Story by: Virendra Sinha
- Produced by: N. V. Ramaswamy
- Starring: Ambareesh
- Cinematography: V. Ranga
- Edited by: Devan
- Music by: G. K. Venkatesh
- Production company: NVR Pictures
- Release date: 19 May 1983
- Running time: 132 minutes
- Country: India
- Language: Kannada

Hosa Theerpu ( transl. Novel Judgement) is a 1983 Indian Kannada-language directed by Shankar Nag, and is a remake of the Hindi-language film Dushmun (1972). It stars Ambareesh as Raja, a reckless truck driver who runs over a farmer, and is sentenced to two years of supporting the deceased's family as punishment for his crime. Jayanthi, Jayamala, Musuri Krishnamurthy, Dheerendra Gopal and Sadashiva Brahmavar feature in supporting roles.

== Plot ==
Raja is a rash truck driver often driving in an inebriated state. After spending a night in a brothel, he rushes to work early next morning, and ends up running over a farmer, Ramu while driving at breakneck-speed through thick fog. He turns himself in, and is brought before the court. Instead of sending him to prison for the crime, magistrate Gopal Rao resolves to try a novel experiment of forcing him to live with the family of the deceased Ramu, and look after their financial needs for two years. The magistrate has an inherent belief that imprisonment does not serve any good for the victim or the perpetrator, and is successful in convincing the bench of his experiment.

Ramu's family includes his widow Seetha, crippled father Ramappa and blind mother Shantha, sons Krishna and Seenu, and sister Kamala. A reluctant Raja is transported to Ramu's village under police protection, where he is met by hostile villagers. The family detests his presence; he attempts to escape on the first night, but is apprehended and brought back to serve his time. Raja gradually comes to terms with the twist of fate that has forced him to become a farmer for subsistence and live under the ever unforgiving eyes of Ramu's family. Over time, he starts sincerely working for their interests. He meets Radha, a happy-go-lucky girl who operates a small bioscope machine to entertain the village kids. They take an instant liking to each other, which blossoms into love. He also finds friends amongst the previously hostile villagers. He works hard on the family plot while also protecting it from the clutches of a local landlord, who has ill-intentioned designs on the land and also on Kamala. Surmounting many obstacles, Raja is able to arrange the marriage of Kamala with her childhood sweetheart Mohan. With the help of a benevolent police force and the magistrate, he is also able to thwart the many attempts of the landlord to seize the family's land, and that of other villagers who have mortgaged their land with the same landlord. Seetha however, is unable to forgive him for having killed her husband.

Things take a dramatic turn for the worse when Raja is framed and arrested over the accidental death of Radha's drunk grandfather. At the same time, the landlord covertly sets the harvest, produced by him, on fire. He then has Radha kidnapped, primarily to punish Raja. Seetha, who has been working in one of the landlord's mills thinking he is an honourable man, witnesses his misdeeds, and finally realises her mistake. She is able to rescue Radha, but gets trapped by the landlord instead, who attempts to rape her. Meanwhile, Raja stages an escape from his holding cell and with the help of Radha, is able to come to Seetha's rescue in the nick of time. He confronts the landlord and violently assaults him as payback. The police show up and arrest the landlord for his role in defrauding the villagers and destroying their harvest. Ramu's family finally accept Raja as one of their own, and arrange his marriage to Radha. However, his two-year term has now completed and the police arrive to escort him back to town. Raja pleads with the magistrate to let him serve a life sentence, who smiles, vindicated that his experiment has been successful. Raja's return to the village is greeted by jubilant villagers.

== Cast ==
- Ambareesh as Raja
- Jayanthi as Seetha
- Jayamala as Radha
- T. N. Balakrishna as Radha's grandfather
- Shivaram as Govindayya
- Musuri Krishnamurthy as Hanumappa
- Dheerendra Gopal as landlord
- Sadashiva Brahmavar as Rangappa
- Rajanand as sub-inspector
- Chethan Ramarao
- Ramesh Bhat as Mohan
- Mandeep Roy as head constable Mootayya
- Sunanda as Kamala
- Shanthamma as Shantha
- Master Manjunath as Seenu
- Srinivasa Raghavan as Krishna
- Charan Raj
- Lakshman
- Jr Narasimharaju as Raja's friend
- Ranadheer
- K. S. Narayana
- N. K. Narasimhaiah
- Mysore Lokesh as prosecutor
- Y. R. Ashwath Narayan
- Kunigal Ramanath
- Anant Nag in a cameo as Magistrate Gopal Rao
- Manjula in a cameo as dancer

== Soundtrack ==
Hosa Theerpu

Soundtrack album by G. K. Venkatesh
- Released: 1983
- Genre: Feature film soundtrack
- Length: 17:44
- Label: INRECO Entertainment Pvt. Ltd.

The film's soundtrack and background score was composed by G. K. Venkatesh. The soundtrack album consists of four tracks, lyrics for which were penned by Chi. Udayashankar and R. N. Jayagopal.

Track listing
No.	Title	Lyrics	Singer(s)	Length
1.	"Baarae Hudugi"	Chi. Udayashankar	S. P. Balasubrahmanyam, P. Susheela	4:33
2.	"Sanjayelli Ee Henna"	R. N. Jayagopal	S. Janaki	4:49
3.	"Hatthe Paisakke"	Chi. Udayashankar	P. Susheela	3:31
4.	"Ee Namma Gandu"	Chi. Udayashankar	S. P. Balasubrahmanyam, P. Susheela	4:51
Total length:				17:44
