= Advani Lakshmi Devi =

Indian (Kannada-cinema) actress

- Born: 1935 or 1936 (age 90–91); Adoni, Bellary, Madras Presidency, British India (in present-day Kurnool), India
- Occupation: Actress
- Years active: 1954–2003
- Spouse: Ramaiah
- Children: Roopadevi

Advani Lakshmi Devi is a retired Indian actress known for her work in Kannada cinema. She played a variety of roles including lead and as supporting actress in Kannada films for over three decades. Her roles in films like Gandhada Gudi (1973) and Sri Srinivasa Kalyana (1974) where she played mother to Dr. Rajkumar made her popular among audiences.

Lakshmi Devi is the mother of Roopadevi, who acted in Kannada films with Rajkumar such as Haalu Jenu (1982), Samayada Gombe (1984) and Yarivanu (1984). Rajkumar holds the distinction of playing the role of her hero and the role of her son. Rajkumar also holds the distinction of playing the hero opposite Lakshmi Devi (in Sri Ramanjaneya Yuddha-1963) as well as her daughter Roopadevi (in 3 films).

Lakshmi Devi was honoured with the Dr. Rajkumar Award (2016) by the government of Karnataka.

== Awards ==
- 2017 – M. V. Rajamma Award by the Karnataka Chalanachitra Academy.
- 2016 – Dr. Rajkumar Award by the Karnataka Government.
- 1973–74 -Karnataka State Film Award for Best Supporting Actress – Gandhada Gudi

== Filmography ==
=== Kannada ===
- Bhakta Vijaya (1956)
- Shukradese (1957)
- Mane Thumbida Hennu (1958)
- Mangala Suthra (1958)
- Jagajyothi Basveshwara (1959)
- Abba Aa Hudugi (1959)
- Dashavathara (1960)...Lakshmi, Seete, Rukmini
- Bhoodana (1962)
- Karuneye Kutumbada Kannu (1962)
- Thejaswini (1962)
- Jeevana Tharanga (1963)
- Kalitharu Henne (1963)
- Sri Ramanjaneya Yuddha (1963)...Seetha
- Chandavalliya Thota (1964)...Lakshmi
- Kalaavati (1964)...Maya
- Kavaleradu Kulavandu (1964)...Lakshmi
- Veera Sankalpa (1964)
- Mantralaya Mahatme (1966)
- Bhagya Devathe (1968)
- Bhageerathi (1969)
- Kappu Bilupu (1969)
- Makkale Manege Manikya (1969)
- Mallammana Pavaada (1969)...Meenakshi
- Mukunda Chandra (1969)
- Namma Makkalu (1969)
- Anireekshitha (1970)
- Karulina Kare (1970)
- Mooru Muttugalu (1970)
- Mruthyu Panjaradalli Goodachari 555 (1970)
- Takka Bitre Sikka (1970)
- Bhale Adrushtavo Adrushta (1971)
- Namma Samsara (1971)
- Paapa Punya (1971)
- Sharapanjara (1971)...Vishali
- Bangaarada Manushya (1972)...Sharada
- Bhale Huchcha (1972)
- Nanda Gokula (1972)...Savitri
- Gandhada Gudi (1973)...Saraswathi
- Seethe Alla Savithri (1973)
- Eradu Kanasu (1974)...Ramu's mother
- Sri Srinivasa Kalyana (1974)...Bakuladevi
- Upasane (1974)...Sumithra
- Mayura (1975)
- Nireekshe (1975)
- Bahaddur Gandu (1976)...Kalyani
- Bayalu Daari (1976)...Savitri
- Mugiyada Kathe (1976)
- Lakshmi Nivasa (1977)
- Madhura Sangama (1978)
- Chandanada Gombe (1979)...Kamalamma
- Janma Janmada Anubandha (1980)...Avinash's mother
- Moogana Sedu (1980)
- Rama Parashurama (1980)
- Rusthum Jodi (1980)...Parvati
- Baadada Hoo (1982)...Parvati
- Chalisuva Modagalu (1982)...Mohan's mother
- Mududida Thavare Aralithu (1983)
- Shravana Banthu (1984)...Savitri
- Jwaalamukhi (1985)...Jayasimha's mother
- Gandhada Gudi Part 2 (1994)
