= Prachanda Kulla =

- Directed by: P. S. Prakash
- Written by: H. V. Subba Rao
- Screenplay by: H. V. Subba Rao
- Produced by: Dwarakish
- Starring: Vishnuvardhan (Special Appearance); Dwarakish; Radhika; R. N. Sudarshan
- Cinematography: P. S. Prakash
- Edited by: Gouthama Raju
- Music by: G. K. Venkatesh
- Production company: Dwarakish Chithra
- Release date: 18 January 1984
- Country: India
- Language: Kannada

Prachanda Kulla is a 1984 Indian Kannada-language film, directed by P. S. Prakash and produced by Dwarakish. The film stars Vishnuvardhan, Dwarakish, Radhika and Sudarshan. The film has musical score by G. K. Venkatesh. The movie is famous for the sequence involving the hero lifting the Shiva idol (linga). The movie was dubbed in Tamil as Veera Mandra Kullan.

== Cast ==
- Vishnuvardhan as Shiva (cameo appearance)
- Dwarakish as Rama
- Radhika as Pushpa
- R. N. Sudarshan as Kinkini Sharma
- Musuri Krishnamurthy as Thatturayya
- Thoogudeepa Srinivas
- Rajanand as King Pashupathi
- Lokanath as Yogindra Muni
- M. S. Umesh as Phaninaga
- Chethan Ramarao as Mantri Patradeva
- Prasanna as Kondanda Rudra
- Rathnakar as Nanjundappa
- Kanchana as Rama's mother
- Geetha as Parvati
- Silk Smitha special appearance in the song Nee Jana Endidde
- Jayamalini special appearance in the song Nee Jana Endidde
- Anuradha special appearance in the song Nee Jana Endidde
- Devikarani
- Sushma
- Sadashiva Brahmavar as Rama's father
- Lakshman
- Shankar Rao as Ganganna
- B. Hanumanthachar
- M. Shivaji Rao
- Shani Mahadevappa as Aryabhata
- Y. R. Ashwath Narayan
- Dingri Nagaraj
- Gode Lakshminarayan
- Rajanagesh
- Saikumar

== Soundtrack ==
The music was composed by G. K. Venkatesh.

No.	Song	Singers	Lyrics	Length (m:ss)
1	"Muddu Mari"	S. P. Balasubrahmanyam	Chi. Udaya Shankar	04:43
2	"Nee Jaana Endidde"	S. Janaki	Chi. Udaya Shankar	02:13
3	"Shivana Geddavane"	S. P. Balasubrahmanyam, S. Janaki	Chi. Udaya Shankar	04:52
4	"Maiyella Jhum Jhum"	S. Janaki, Dwarakish	Chi. Udaya Shankar	05:17
5	"Nane Kano Bhoopa"	S. P. Balasubrahmanyam	Chi. Udaya Shankar	04:34
