= Engamma Maharani =

- Title card
- Directed by: M. A. Kaja
- Written by: M. A. Kaja; Dialogues; Vietnam Veedu Sundaram
- Produced by: M. Manickyam Chettiar; Raghunath R.
- Starring: Delhi Ganesh; Sumithra; Roopa; Y. Vijaya
- Cinematography: T. V. Balu
- Edited by: M. Umanath; M. Mani
- Music by: Shankar–Ganesh
- Production company: Sri Gayathri Enterprises
- Release date: 13 March 1981
- Country: India
- Language: Tamil

Engamma Maharani (transl. My mother is a queen) is a 1981 Indian Tamil-language film directed by M. A. Kaja starring Delhi Ganesh, Sumithra, Roopa and Y. Vijaya. It was released on 13 March 1981.

The film won the 1981 Tamil Nadu State Film Award for Best Lyricist for Pulamaipithan and remain as one of the rare films of Ganesh where he played the hero.

== Plot ==
A happy family consisting of Delhi Ganesh, Sumithra and their three daughters gets affected by the arrival of a model, who gets intimate with Ganesh.

== Cast ==
- Delhi Ganesh
- Sumithra as Delhi Ganesh's wife
- Roopa
- Vijay Babu
- Suruli Rajan
- Nalinikanth
- Ragini
- Y. Vijaya as the model

== Soundtrack ==
Soundtrack was composed by Shankar–Ganesh.

Track listing
No.	Title	Lyrics	Singer(s)	Length
1.	"Maalaiyil Pootha"	Pulamaipithan	S. P. Balasubrahmanyam, Vani Jairam
2.	"Annam Pola"	M. A. Kaja	Vani Jairam
3.	"Ethanai Kuzhandhai"	Pulamaipithan	S. P. Sailaja, Uma Ramanan, Krishnamoorthy
