= Tony (1982 film) =

- Directed by: H. R. Bhargava
- Written by: H. R. Bhargava
- Produced by: Mohan Sharma; Jairaj Singh
- Starring: Ambareesh; Srinath; Lakshmi
- Cinematography: R. Chittibabu
- Edited by: Yadav Victor
- Music by: Rajan–Nagendra
- Production company: Chaturbhuja
- Release date: 23 August 1982
- Running time: 123 minutes
- Country: India
- Language: Kannada

Tony is a 1982 Indian Kannada-language action film directed by H.R. Bhargava and produced by Mohan Sharma and Jairaj Singh. The film stars Ambareesh, Lakshmi and Srinath.

== Cast ==
- Ambareesh as Tony Malcolm
- Lakshmi as Jyothi
- Srinath as Prasad
- Sundar Krishna Urs as Rajendra, Jyothi's brother
- Musuri Krishnamurthy as Kamanna
- Dinesh as Damodara
- Shakti Prasad as Lakshmipathi
- Rajanand as Priest Joseph
- M. Jayashree
- K. V. Manjayya
- Srilalitha
- Shobha
- M. Jayashree
- Master Manjunath as Rajendra's son (uncredited)
- Tiger Prabhakar as Sudheer (cameo)
- Shivaram as Colonel Donald Malcolm (cameo)
- Uma Shivakumar as Lucy Malcolm (cameo)
- Prathima Devi as Savitri, Jyothi's mother (cameo)

== Soundtrack ==
The music was composed by Rajan–Nagendra, with lyrics by R. N. Jayagopal and Doddarangegowda. All the songs composed for the film were received extremely well and considered as evergreen songs.

Track listing
No.	Title	Lyrics	Singer(s)	Length
1.	"Aanandave Mai Thumbide"	Doddarangegowda	S. P. Balasubrahmanyam, S. Janaki	03:48
2.	"Cheluva Prathime Neenu"	R. N. Jayagopal	S. P. Balasubrahmanyam	04:10
3.	"Preethi Beleyali"	R. N. Jayagopal	S. P. Balasubrahmanyam, S. Janaki	04:16
4.	"Neeliya Baaninda"	Doddarangegowda	Ravi, Nagendra	03:50
