= Bettada Hoovu =

1985 film

- Theatrical release poster
- Directed by: N. Lakshminarayan
- Screenplay by: N. Lakshminarayan
- Story by: Shirley L. Arora
- Based on: What then, Raman? by Shirley L. Arora
- Produced by: Parvathamma Rajkumar
- Starring: Puneeth Rajkumar; Padma Vasanthi
- Cinematography: B. C. Gowrishankar
- Edited by: P. Bhaktavatsalam
- Music by: Rajan–Nagendra
- Release date: 1985
- Running time: 148 minutes
- Country: India
- Language: Kannada

Bettada Hoovu ( transl. Hill Flower) is a 1985 Indian Kannada-language film directed by N. Lakshminarayan, based on the Shirley L. Arora's novel What then, Raman?. Produced by Parvathamma Rajkumar, it stars her son Puneeth Rajkumar in the lead role. Puneeth plays Ramu, a young boy born into a poor family, who is fond of reading books, but is forced to discontinue his studies and support his family financially. His performance earned him the National Film Award for Best Child Artist. In 2017, Deccan Herald rated the film number one among the best "children's movies in Kannada". The film won three Filmfare Awards South. The movie was also screened at Tehran.

== Plot ==
Ramu is a young boy born into a poor family, living with his parents and two siblings in a hill station. His parents hardly make ends meet; mother working as a fruit- and vegetable-seller, and father running errands in and around the village, often as a help to the visiting tourists. However, Ramu likes reading his books and going to school. He even has a friendship with a healthcare worker, who teaches him English after school. He is fascinated after watching a screening of the film Sri Ramanjaneya Yuddha in his village and also upon seeing Kuvempu's Sri Ramayana Darshanam at a bookstore, both based on the epic Ramayana, and wishes to buy the latter to read. The book costing ₹10, he begins working towards saving the money.

Due to an off-season when tourists return home, Ramu's family situation becomes dire and his father has to move to the city in search of work, leaving the responsibility of managing the family to young Ramu. Ramu is now forced to drop out of school to earn for his family. He starts doing little chores around the village, while saving a part of his earnings towards buying the book. He begins selling wildflowers to an American teacher, who is writing a book on Indian wildflowers. He earns ten rupees, enough to buy the book, when he brings an orchid flower to the teacher. However, when he goes to buy the book, he has a rethink. He has to make a decision between buying the book or a blanket to comfort his family members from the chilling winter cold. In the end, he decides to get the blanket, much to the happiness of his family. But then his dream of buying the book is shattered.

== Cast ==
- Master Puneeth as Ramu
- Padma Vasanthi as Parvati, Ramu's mother
- Marcia Jamal as a teacher
- Roopadevi as a healthcare worker (cameo)
- Aalemane Mohan Kumar as Chinnappa, Ramu's father
- Balakrishna as Doddajja
- Shivaprakash
- Sadashiva Brahmavar as Muthanna, shopkeeper
- Shankanada Aravind as Somanna (credited as Anubhava Aravind)
- Honnavalli Krishna as Linganna
- Kunigal Ramanath
- B. Ramamurthy
- Baby Savitha as Vasanthi, Ramu's sister

== Soundtrack ==
The music was composed by Rajan–Nagendra.

1. "Patte Huli Balu Ketta Huli" – C. Aswath
2. "Bisile Irali Maleye Barali" – S. P. Balasubrahmanyam, Master Puneeth
3. "Thaayi Sharade" – Master Puneeth, P. B. Sreenivas

== Awards ==
National Film Awards – 1985

- Best Kannada Film — Parvathamma Rajkumar
- Best Child Actor – Puneeth Rajkumar

1984–85 Karnataka State Film Awards

- Second Best Film — Parvathamma Rajkumar
- Best Story Writer – Shirley L. Arora

Filmfare Awards South

- Best Film - Kannada - Parvathamma Rajkumar
- Best Director - Kannada - N. Lakshminarayan
- Special Award Best Child Actor - Puneeth Rajkumar
