= Garuda Rekhe =

- Directed by: P. S. Prakash
- Written by: Perala
- Screenplay by: Somu
- Produced by: P. Sheshaiah; B. Manmatha Rao; M. Shivaji Rao; N. M. Victor; P. Venkata Reddy
- Starring: Srinath; Ambika; Madhavi Hema Chaudhary Vajramuni
- Cinematography: P. S. Prakash
- Edited by: Victor Yadav
- Music by: Sathyam
- Production company: Tharangini Art Productions
- Release date: 25 May 1982
- Country: India
- Language: Kannada

Garuda Rekhe is a 1982 Indian Kannada film, directed by P. S. Prakash and produced by G. S. Vasu, P. Sheshaiah, B. Manmatha Rao, M. Shivaji Rao, N. M. Victor and P. Venkata Reddy. The film stars Srinath, Ambika, Madhavi, Hema Chowdhary and Vajramuni in the lead roles. The film has a musical score by Sathyam.

== Cast ==
- Srinath
- Madhavi
- Ambika
- Hema Choudhary
- Tiger Prabhakar as Narasimha
- Vajramuni
- K.Vijaya
- Thoogudeepa Srinivas
- Dinesh
- Shakti Prasad
- Shashikala
- Master Rohith
- Lakshman
- Jr. Narasimharaju
- Rathnakar
