= Sneham Oru Pravaaham =

- Directed by: Dr. Shajahan
- Written by: Dr. Shajahan; Latheesh Kumar (dialogues)
- Screenplay by: Dr. Shajahan
- Produced by: Deepthivarsha Films
- Starring: Sukumaran; Vincent; Roopa; Jagathy Sreekumar; Silk Smitha
- Cinematography: Vipin Das
- Edited by: K. Sankunni
- Music by: K. J. Joy
- Production company: Deepthivarsha Films
- Distributed by: Deepthivarsha Films
- Release date: 3 July 1981
- Country: India
- Language: Malayalam

Sneham Oru Pravaaham is a 1981 Indian Malayalam film, directed by Dr. Shajahan. The film stars Sukumaran, Vincent, Roopa, Jagathy Sreekumar and Silk Smitha in the lead roles. The film has musical score by K. J. Joy.

== Cast ==
- Jagathy Sreekumar
- Sukumaran
- Roopa
- Silk Smitha
- Mohan Babu
- Vincent
- Francis
- Amir Khan
- Aranmula Ponnamma
- Trissur Elsy

== Soundtrack ==
The music was composed by K. J. Joy and the lyrics was written by Dr. Shajahan.

| No. | Song | Singers | Lyrics | Length (m:ss) |
|---|---|---|---|---|
| 1 | "Aazhiyodennum" | K. J. Yesudas, Chorus | | |
| 2 | "Malarmizhi Nee Madhumozhi Nee" | K. J. Yesudas | | |
| 3 | "Manikkinaakkal" | Vani Jairam | | |
| 4 | "Nilaavil Nee Varoo" | K. J. Yesudas | | |
