= Simha Jodi =

- Directed by: Joe Simon
- Written by: Kunigal Nagabhushan (dialogues)
- Screenplay by: Kunigal Nagabhushan
- Story by: Ajantha Combines
- Produced by: A. R. Raju
- Starring: Vishnuvardhan; Manjula; Halam; A. Roopa
- Cinematography: H. G. Raju
- Edited by: P. Venkateshwara Rao
- Music by: Satyam
- Production company: Ajantha Combines
- Distributed by: Ajantha Combines
- Release date: 21 August 1980
- Running time: 152 min
- Country: India
- Language: Kannada

Simha Jodi is a 1980 Indian Kannada-language film, directed by Joe Simon and produced by A. R. Raju. The film stars Vishnuvardhan, Manjula, Halam and Roopadevi in lead roles. Actress Roopadevi made her Kannada debut in this movie in which she played Vishnuvardhan's sister (credited as A.Roopa).

== Cast ==
- Vishnuvardhan as Prakash
- Manjula as Uma
- Halam as Deepa
- Roopadevi - credited as A. Roopa as Lakshmi
- Shanthamma
- Shashirakha
- Shantha
- Baby Rekha
- Baby Geetha
- Baby Vijayadev
- Master Babu
- Dheerendra Gopal
- Dinesh as Neelakanta
- Musuri Krishnamurthy as Srikanta
- Jai Jagadish as Chandru
- Prabhakar as Louis
- B Hanumanthachar
- Sundar Krishna Urs in Guest Appearance as Police Inspector
- Leelavathi in Guest Appearance as Uma's mother
- Chethan Ramarao in Guest Appearance
