= Yarivanu =

Yaarivanu
- Poster
- Directed by: Dorai–Bhagavan
- Screenplay by: Chi. Udayashankar
- Story by: M. D. Sundar
- Produced by: Parvathamma Rajkumar
- Starring: Master Lohith; Rajkumar; Roopa Devi; B. Saroja Devi; Srinath; Hema Choudhary
- Cinematography: S. S. Lal; Kabir Lal
- Edited by: P. Bhaktavatsalam
- Music by: Rajan–Nagendra
- Production company: Dakshayini Combines
- Release date: 1984
- Running time: 130 minutes
- Country: India
- Language: Kannada

Yaarivanu (transl. Who is he?) is a 1984 Indian Kannada-language thriller film, directed by Dorai–Bhagavan and produced by Parvathamma Rajkumar. The film stars Rajkumar, Srinath, B. Saroja Devi, Roopa Devi, Hema Choudhary and Puneeth Rajkumar. The screenplay, dialogues and lyrics were written by Chi. Udaya Shankar and story was by M. D. Sundar. Master Lohith played a double role in the movie, though both roles never appear together onscreen. It was his second dual role movie after the 1983 movie Eradu Nakshatragalu.

== Plot ==
Shyam, younger brother of Sridhar dies while falling from a boat and S.P ( Superintendent of Police) Bhaskar is investigating the case. Sridhar and other family members receives a huge shock when Shyam appears alive, at home one day. In the end, it turns out that the boy happens to be a lookalike of Shyam, is the son of Bhaskar and he was made to act as Shyam in order to find out the truth. Shyam was killed by Shridhar in order to take over his property. Sridhar dies by falling down a cliff and Shyam unites with both of his mothers.

== Cast ==
- Rajkumar as Superintendent of police Bhaskar
- Puneeth Rajkumar (credited as Master Lohit) as Shyam, Bhaskar's son
- Roopa Devi as Bhaskar's wife
- Srinath as Shridhar
- B. Saroja Devi as Shridhar's step-mother
- Hema Choudhary as Nirmala, Shridhar's wife
- Shringar Nagaraj
- Shivaram as Hari, Nirmala's elder brother
- Thoogudeepa Srinivas as Shankarlal
- Shani Mahadevappa as Shivanna, maid
- Neegro Johnny as Shabbeer

== Production ==
- During the shooting of this movie in Ooty, Rajkumar was attacked by about 30 unknown miscreants armed with cycle chains and razors on March 3. The Akhila Karnataka Dr Rajkumar Abhimangala Sangha (the fans association) demanded the Tamil film distributors in the city that they stop screening Tamil films until March 22 and the distributors agreed. The fact of his being roughed up has become a major issue in the state. In the welter of allegations that followed, the Janata Party and A.K. Subbiah, the Kannada Nadu chief and former BJP strongman featured prominently as the forces to blame while Subbiah said that it was the Congress(I) that was behind the episode.
- Srinath had to get beaten by Rajkumar in the movie. But Rajkumar sternly refused to beat Srinath in the climax, in spite of Srinath & Director duo Dorai-Bhagwan's repeated requests. Rajkumar was firm, saying Srinath is a dear friend and he would not want to project enmity even on screen. He was aware of the travails Vishnuvardhan had faced, due to a mishap while shooting Gandhada Gudi and didn't want any such thing to recur. Relenting to it, Dorai-Bhagwan changed the climax, so that Srinath would fall off the cliff and die.
- Roopa Devi, who starred in Dorai-Bhagwan's Samayada Gombe was retained as the female lead in this movie.
- Director S K Bhagwan had revealed that he was so impressed by the climax twist of the movie Chase A Crooked Shadow that he had used it as a reference point for this movie.

== Soundtrack ==
The music of the film was composed by Rajan–Nagendra, with lyrics penned by Chi. Udaya Shankar.

Yaarivanu

Soundtrack album by Rajan–Nagendra
- Released: 1984
- Length: 19:06
- Language: Kannada
- Label: MRT Music
- Director: Rajan–Nagendra

Rajan–Nagendra chronology
Premigala Saval (1984)	Yaarivanu (1984)	Bettada Hoovu (1985)

=== Track list ===
#	Title	Singer(s)
1	"Kannige Kaanuva"	Master Lohith
2	"Raagavo Anuragavo"	Dr. Rajkumar, S. Janaki
3	"Kaveri Yeke Oduve"	Dr. Rajkumar
4	"Aakashade Haaraduva"	Dr. Rajkumar, Master Lohith
