= Rudranaga =

Rudra Naga
- Directed by: K. Mani Murugan
- Written by: Kunigal Nagabhushan (dialogues)
- Screenplay by: Jain Movies
- Story by: K. Gangadhar
- Produced by: Chandulal Jain; J. M. Purohith
- Starring: Vishnuvardhan; Madhavi; Sudarshan; B. Saroja Devi
- Cinematography: H. G. Raju
- Edited by: Joseph
- Music by: M. Ranga Rao
- Production company: Jain Movies
- Distributed by: Jain Movies
- Release date: 18 April 1984
- Running time: 133 minutes
- Country: India
- Language: Kannada

Rudra Naga is a 1984 Indian Kannada-language film, directed by K. Mani Murugan and produced by Chandulal Jain and J. M. Purohith. The film stars Vishnuvardhan, Madhavi, B. Saroja Devi and Sudarshan. The film has musical score by M. Ranga Rao.

== Cast ==
- Vishnuvardhan as Rudranaga
- Madhavi as Lakshmi
- Sudarshan as Chandra Gowda
- B. Saroja Devi as Girija
- Balakrishna as Harishchandra
- Sadashiva Brahmavar as Mestru
- M. Jayashree as Meenakshi
- Kunigal Nagabhushan as Rangappa
- Master Naveen as Raje Gowda

== Soundtrack ==
The music was composed by M. Ranga Rao. In this film, Vishnu Vardhan recorded a duet with noted playback singer Bangalore Latha which became popular.

| No. | Song | Singers | Lyrics | Length (m:ss) |
|---|---|---|---|---|
| 1 | "Hoovinantha Manasone" | S. P. Balasubrahmanyam, Vani Jairam | R. N. Jayagopal | 04:38 |
| 2 | "Cheluveya Kandu" | S. P. Balasubrahmanyam, Vani Jairam | Shyama Sundara Kulakarni | 04:50 |
| 3 | "Cheluvina Chenniga" | Vishnuvardhan, Bangalore Latha | R. N. Jayagopal | 04:42 |
| 4 | "Nannavva Bhoothayi" | S. P. Balasubrahmanyam | R. N. Jayagopal | 04:40 |
