= Samayada Gombe =

1984 Kannada drama film directed by Dorai – Bhagawan duo

- Poster
- Directed by: Dorai–Bhagavan
- Written by: Chi. Udaya Shankar (dialogues)
- Screenplay by: Dorai–Bhagavan
- Story by: Chitralekha
- Produced by: Dorai–Bhagavan; Rathi Radhakrishna
- Starring: Dr. Rajkumar; Roopa Devi; Kanchana; Srinath
- Cinematography: B. C. Gowrishankar
- Edited by: P. Bhaktavatsalam
- Music by: M. Ranga Rao; Chi. Udaya Shankar (lyrics)
- Production company: Sri Thripura Sundari Combines
- Release date: 1984
- Running time: 150 minutes
- Country: India
- Language: Kannada

Samayada Gombe (transl. Puppet of the times) is a 1984 Indian Kannada-language drama film directed and co-produced by Dorai–Bhagavan. The film stars Dr. Rajkumar, Srinath, Roopa Devi and Menaka. It is based on the novel of same name written by Chitralekha.

The film met with positive response from critics and was declared a blockbuster at the box office, seeing a theatrical run of at least 26 weeks. Bhagawan had revealed that Dr. Rajkumar's remuneration for the film was ₹ 6 lakh.

== Plot ==
Truck driver Guru rescues a kidnapped boy and arranges to return him to his family. In a flashback sequence, it is shown that Guru is himself a runaway. Anil, is born into a wealthy family in New Delhi. When he accidentally injures his sister, fearing punishment from his disciplinarian father, he runs away from home. Ending up in a quarry operated by child trafficker Dharmadas, Anil is named Guru. He manages to escape from the quarry and runs into truck driver Rangappa, who brings him up like his own son.

When Guru is forced to sell off his truck to meet the dowry obligations and marry off his foster sister, he becomes a car driver for Squadron leader Vinod Kumar. Guru is in a romantic relationship with flower seller Gauri. At a homage ceremony for Vinod's wife Lakshmi's father, Guru finds out that Lakshmi is his biological sister, and that their father had died in grief after Anil had run away more than twenty years ago. However, Guru does not reveal his real identity as he feels that he has failed his family.

Guru earns the trust of Vinod's family. When he learns that his biological mother is on her deathbed in New Delhi he travels there to see her, only to witness her take her last breath. A few days later, Vinod's family decides to return to their native place, and Guru rushes to the airport to see them off. He bids them a tearful goodbye, without revealing his identity to his sister.

== Cast ==
- Dr. Rajkumar as Anil / Gurumurthy (Guru)
- Srinath as Sqn Ldr Vinod Kumar
- Roopa Devi as Gauri
- Menaka as Lakshmi, Anil's sister
- Shakti Prasad as Rangappa, Guru's foster father
- Kanchana as Kamakshi, Guru's foster mother
- Sadhana as Mangala, Rangappa's daughter
- R. N. Sudarshan as Dharmadasa
- Thoogudeepa Srinivas as Puttappa, a moneylender
- Musuri Krishnamurthy as Gauri's father
- Shivaram as sub-inspector
- Uma Shivakumar
- Shashikala
- Mysore Lokesh as Naga, a thief
- Sadashiva Brahmavar as Bhat, hotel owner
- Chandru
- Kunigal Ramanath
- Negro Johnny as Puttappa's henchman
- Papamma as Subbamma, maid at Vinod Kumar's home
- Swapna
- Master Sanjay
- Baby Sushma
- Baby Sangeetha
- Master Arjun
- Master Ravi
- Lohithaswa as Anil's father (uncredited)
- K. V. Manjayya (uncredited)
- Shani Mahadevappa as Kalappa (uncredited)

== Soundtrack ==
The music of the film was composed by M. Ranga Rao with lyrics written by Chi. Udaya Shankar.

Samayada Gombe

Soundtrack album by M. Ranga Rao
- Released: 1984
- Recorded: 1984
- Genre: Feature film soundtrack
- Length: 23:57
- Language: Kannada
- Label: MRT Music
- Director: M. Ranga Rao

M. Ranga Rao chronology
Rudranaga (1984)	Samayada Gombe (1984)	Shravana Banthu (1984)

=== Track list ===
#	Title	Singer(s)
1	"Kogile Haadide"	Dr. Rajkumar, S. Janaki
2	"Sankochava Bidu"	Dr. Rajkumar, S. Janaki
3	"Nanna Saradara"	Dr. Rajkumar, S. Janaki
4	"Aakasha Kelageke"	Dr. Rajkumar
5	"Chinnada Bombeyalla"	Dr. Rajkumar

== Reception ==
The movie upon release won critical acclaim for the story and performances of the lead actors. The movie completed 50 days in all 20 first release centres. The movie ran for 175 days in Bengaluru and Mysuru and 100 days in several theatres in Uttara Karnataka.
