= Sreenivas G. Kappanna =

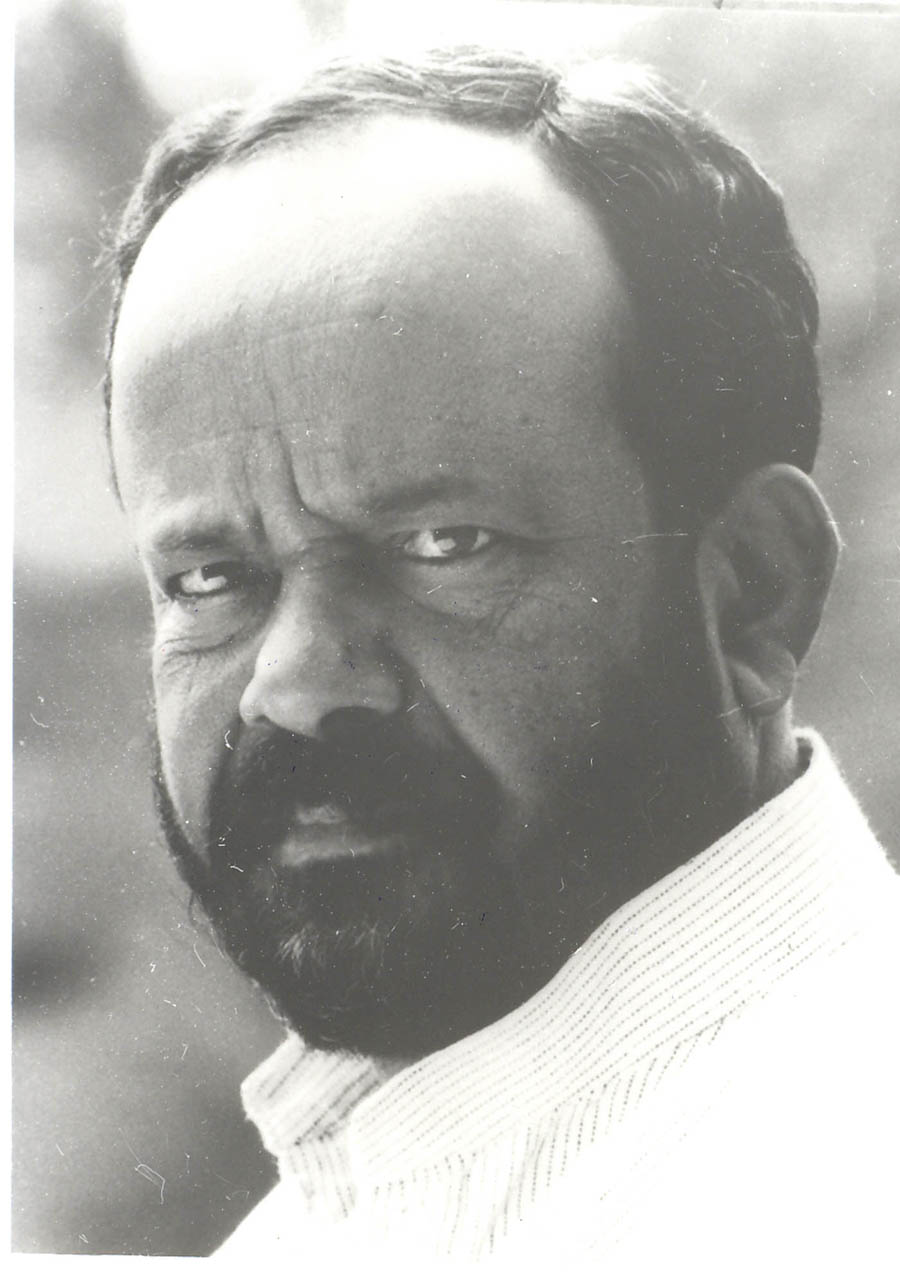
A portrait of Shri Sreenivas G. Kappanna who was presented was Sangeet Natak Akademi Award for Allied Theatre Arts - Lighting & Stage Design by the President Dr. A.P.J Abdul Kalam in New Delhi on 26 October 2004

Sreenivas G. Kappanna is an Indian specialist in theatrical productions and cultural movements.

== Early life ==
Kappanna started stage work during his days as a student at The National College, Basavanagudi, under the tutelage of Dr. H. Narasimhaiah and make-up artist Nani. Since then, he has worked in stage lighting, stage design, play production, and presentation of folk and classical forms.

== Career ==
Between 1967 and 1970, Kappanna engaged in backstage work, as well as theater lighting for English-language productions. He has designed lighting for many dancers of the country, and has worked in a number of television genres.

Kappanna has also led and choreographed teams from Karnataka in the Indian Republic Day Parade between 1982 and 1998. Presently, Kappanna is the Artistic Director of the Prasidda Foundation, dedicated to the performing arts, and of Bhramari, a creative dance troupe. Kappanna has also served as Chairman of the Karnataka Nataka Akademy.

== Awards ==
He was awarded Sangeet Natak Akademi Award for Allied Theatre Arts - Lighting & Stage Design on 26 October 2004.
