= Baddi Bangaramma =

- Directed by: Kommineni
- Screenplay by: Kommineni
- Produced by: Y. V. Rao
- Starring: Srinath; Jai Jagadish; Bhavya; Ramakrishna; Uma Shivakumar; Dinesh
- Cinematography: S. S. Lal; Kabir Lal
- Edited by: D. Rajagopal Rao
- Music by: K. Chakravarthy
- Production company: Ravichithra Films
- Release date: 1984
- Running time: 142 minutes
- Country: India
- Language: Kannada

Baddi Bangaramma is a 1984 Indian Kannada language film directed by Kommineni. It is the remake of Telugu movie Konte Koddulu, directed by Kommineni. It stars Srinath, Jai Jagadish, Bhavya, Mahalakshmi, Ramakrishna and Uma Shivakumar, who played the title role of Baddi Bangaramma, in pivotal roles. Uma Shivakumar's performance as a moneylender in the film received appreciation and was henceforth referred to as Baddi Bangaramma by the audience.

== Cast ==
- Srinath as General Knowledge Janaki Ram
- Uma Shivakumar Baddi Bangaramma
- Jai Jagadish as Shekar
- Ramakrishna as Gopi
- Bhavya as Bhagyalakshmi
- Mahalakshmi as Dhanalakshmi
- Dinesh as Kokke Kodanda
- Jayamalini Mrudanga Mandakini
- Anuradha Tabala Kamala
- P. R. Varalakshmi
- Jayavijaya
- Kunigal Nagabhushan
- Shivaprakash
- Sarigama Vijaykumar
- Pemmasani Ramakrishna

== Soundtrack ==
Baddi Bangaramma

Soundtrack album by K. Chakravarthy
- Released: 1984
- Genre: Feature film soundtrack
- Label: Saregama

K. Chakravarthy composed the music for the film, with lyrics for the soundtracks written by Dodddarange Gowda and R. N. Jayagopal.

Tracklist
No.	Title	Lyrics	Singer(s)	Length
1.	"Nanna Srimathi Aagodu Yaavaaga"		P. Susheela, Raja
2.	"Prathi Dinavu Ide Kathe"	Doddarange Gowda	P. Susheela, Ramesh
3.	"Ee Nanna Kannalli"	R. N. Jayagopal	S. P. Balasubrahmanyam, P. Susheela
4.	"Thaalayya Swalpa Neenu"	R. N. Jayagopal	P. Susheela, Ramesh, Raja
5.	"Ibbare Naavillibbare"	Doddarange Gowda	P. Susheela, Jayachandran
