= Huli Hejje =

- Directed by: K. S. L. Swamy (Ravee)
- Written by: K. Dharmaraj
- Screenplay by: K. Dharmaraj
- Produced by: Shashirekha
- Starring: Vishnuvardhan; Tiger Prabhakar; Vijayalakshmi Singh; Srigeetha
- Cinematography: Purushottham B. Valke
- Edited by: Yadav Victor
- Music by: Vijaya Bhaskar
- Production company: Navanidhi Chithra
- Distributed by: Navanidhi Chithra
- Release date: 20 July 1984
- Running time: 116 minutes
- Country: India
- Language: Kannada

Huli Hejje ( transl. Footsteps of the tiger) is a 1984 Indian Kannada-language film, directed by K. S. L. Swamy (Ravee) and produced by Shashirekha. The film stars Vishnuvardhan, Tiger Prabhakar, Vijayalakshmi Singh and Srigeetha. The film has musical score by Vijaya Bhaskar.

== Cast ==
- Vishnuvardhan as Somu
- Tiger Prabhakar as Purushottam
- Vijayalakshmi Singh
- Srigeetha
- Jai Jagadish as Manjunath
- M. V. Vasudeva Rao
- Sundar Krishna Urs as Ranganath
- Sudheer
- Dinesh
- Doddanna
- Master Ravi
- Pramila Joshai
- Shashikala
- Theresamma
- Suman
- Chayadevi
- Mallika
- Shivaprakash
- Bhatti Mahadevappa
- Ashwath Narayan

== Soundtrack ==
The music was composed by Vijaya Bhaskar.

No.	Song	Singers	Lyrics	Length (m:ss)
1	"Kandadda Kandhange"	Vishnuvardhan	Dodda Range Gowda	04:27
2	"Hoovu Mullu"	S. P. Balasubrahmanyam, Vani Jairam	R. N. Jayagopal	04:36
3	"Ahamevaasmi"	P. B. Sreenivas, Vani Jairam	P. B. Sreenivas	04:14
4	"Amma Amma"	S. P. Balasubrahmanyam	R. N. Jayagopal	04:52
5	"Begane Ba"	Narayan, Veena	SU. Rudramurthy Shastry	04:46
