= Chamundeshwari Studios =

Film studio in Bengaluru, Karnataka, India

Chamundeshware Studios
- Type: Private Limited
- Industry: Motion pictures
- Founded: 1969
- Key people: S. M. Sriramulu Naidu, Kuppuswamy Naidu

Chamundeshware Studio is a major motion picture film studio located in Bengaluru, Karnataka, India. It was established in the year 1969 by Coimbatore based movie moghul S. M. Sriramulu Naidu along with his nephew Kuppuswamy Naidu.
