= Accident (1984 film) =

1984 film

- Theatrical release poster
- Directed by: Shankar Nag
- Screenplay by: Vasant Mukashi
- Dialogues by: G. S. Sadashiva
- Story by: Vasant Mukashi
- Produced by: Shankar Nag
- Starring: Anant Nag; Shankar Nag; Arundhati Nag; Ramesh Bhat
- Cinematography: Devadhar
- Edited by: P. Bhaktavatsalam
- Music by: Ilaiyaraaja
- Distributed by: Sanket
- Release date: 9 November 1984
- Running time: 125 minutes
- Country: India
- Language: Kannada

Accident is a 1984 Indian Kannada-language crime drama film produced & directed by Shankar Nag. It stars Shankar Nag, Anant Nag, Arundhati Nag, Ramesh Bhat, Ashok Mandanna, Srinivas Prabhu and Nagabharana. The music was composed by Ilaiyaraaja, cinematography and editing by Devadhar and Bhaktavatsalam. Despite released to positive critical acclaim, but film was a box office failure.

== Plot ==
Deepak is the spoiled son of a powerful politician Dharmadhikari. One night, Deepak runs his car over pavement dwellers under the influence of drugs and alcohol; the pavement dwellers are killed, except Ramanna, who identifies the driver. Rahul, Deepak's friend and the son of an ad agency chief, was with him during the accident. Rahul gets deeply traumatized due to the shock of the accident, he shares the truth with his mother Maya Rani. Maya implores Dharmadhikari to save them. Dharmadhikari, who is slated to win a by-election, cannot afford to let this accident ruin his political ambitions. Dharmadhikari hushes up the case with the help of the CM and sends Deepak on a trip abroad. Inspector Rao takes charge of the case as an investigative officer. Ravi, a daring news reporter, joins Rao in investigating the case together. When Rao identifies the culprits, Dharmadhikari asks his retired driver to tell them that he was driving the car. As a result of the events that have transpired, Rao is asked to go on leave and Ravi's editor refuses to run the story. Ravi tries to assassinate Dharmadhikari to seek justice, but he backs out and moralises that violence does not solve problems. Meanwhile, Deepak, who is leaving to the airport, dies in an accident.

== Cast ==
- Anant Nag as Dharmadhikari
- Shankar Nag as Ravi
- Arundhati Nag as Maya Rani
- Ashok Mandanna as Deepak, Dharmadhikari's son
- Makeup Naani as Shamanna
- Srinivas Prabhu as Rahul
- Ramesh Bhat as Inspector Rao
- T. S. Nagabharana as Ramanna
- H. G. Somashekar Rao as Pinto
- Shimoga Venkatesh as Commissioner of Police

== Production ==
Accident was produced in two months. While filming the climax, Anant Nag, who was playing Dharmadhikari, was to be shot in the courtyard of his house as he had wanted to base it around the assassination of Indira Gandhi, but Shankar Nag did not agree and changed the ending of the film. This movie was released on 9th November 1984, just 9 days after Indira Gandhi's assassination on 31st October 1984, making it very unlikely that the climax was changed in response to the event.

== Reception ==
The film won the inaugural National Film Award for Best Film on Other Social Issues at the 32nd National Film Awards in 1985. It also won multiple awards at the 1984–85 Karnataka State Film Awards including the award for First Best Film. The film was praised for placing a politician against justice system and media revealing the nexus between politics and drug mafia.

== Awards and recognitions ==
32nd National Film Awards

- National Film Award for Best Film on Other Social Issues

1984–85 Karnataka State Film Awards

- First Best Film
- Best Supporting Actress – Arundathi Nag
- Best Screenplay – Vasantha Mokashi
- Best Sound Recording – Pandurangan
- Special Award (Stunts) – Hasan Raghu

14th International Film Festival of India

- Screening; homage to Shankar Nag
