= Mullina Gulabi =

- Directed by: Vijay
- Written by: M. D. Sundar
- Produced by: Vijay
- Starring: Ananth Nag; Aarathi; Jai Jagadish
- Cinematography: P. V. Sai Prasad
- Edited by: P. Bhaktavatsalam
- Music by: Satyam
- Production company: Navadurga Productions
- Release date: 1982
- Running time: 122 minutes
- Country: India
- Language: Kannada

Mullina Gulabi ( transl. Rose with thorns) is a 1982 Kannada-language film directed and produced by Vijay. The story was written by M. D. Sundar. The film stars Ananth Nag and Aarathi in lead roles.

The film has musical score by Satyam, whilst the lyrics and dialogues were written by Chi. Udaya Shankar.

== Plot ==
Aarathi arrives at the estate owned by two brothers played by Anant Nag and Jai Jagadish and becomes a daily-wage labourer. When Jai Jagadish falls for her and wants to marry her all hell breaks loose. It is revealed that Aarathi and Anant Nag were lovers in their college days and believing she was jilted by him, she is here to seek revenge. The song Ee Gulabiyu Ninagagi was very popular.

== Cast ==
- Anant Nag as Mohan
- Aarathi as Mala
- Roopa Devi as Radha
- Jai Jagadish as Sudhakar
- Tiger Prabhakar
- Balakrishna
- Rajanand
- Musuri Krishnamurthy
- Dinesh
- Tiger Prabhakar
- Rajanand
- M. S. Karanth
- Shyamala

== Soundtrack ==
The music was composed by Satyam, with lyrics by Chi. Udaya Shankar. The title song (both male and female versions) was a huge hit among the masses.

Track listing
No.	Title	Singer(s)	Length
1.	"Ee Gulabiyu Ninagagi"	S. P. Balasubrahmanyam
2.	"Mulle Illada Gulabi"	S. P. Balasubrahmanyam, S. Janaki, Sulochana, Ramesh
3.	"Yaaru Yarige Maduve"	Ramesh, Sulochana
4.	"Baanalli Raviyu"	S. P. Balasubrahmanyam, S. Janaki
5.	"Ee Gulabiyu Ninagagi"	S. Janaki
