= Marali Goodige =

- Directed by: K. R. Shantharam
- Written by: Smt. Aryamba Pattabhi
- Screenplay by: Smt. Aryamba Pattabhi
- Produced by: S. Balaji
- Starring: Kalyan Kumar; Jai Jagadeesh; Roopa; Poornima
- Cinematography: B. C. Gowrishankar
- Music by: Rajan–Nagendra
- Release date: 1984
- Country: India
- Language: Kannada

Marali Goodige is a 1984 Indian Kannada film directed by K. R. Shantharam. It stars Kalyan Kumar, Jai Jagadeesh, Roopa and Poornima in the lead roles. The music of the film was composed by Rajan–Nagendra. This movie is based on the novel by Smt. Aryamba Pattabhi, with the same name.

== Cast ==
- Kalyan Kumar
- Jai Jagadeesh
- Roopa
- Poornima

== Songs ==
- "Hosa Baalina Hosa Bandhana"
- "Nee Nudiyadiralenu"
- "Varavaagi Bandeya"
- "Yaaru Nannavanenedu"
