= Shanthamma =

Indian actress (1925–2020)

- Born: 1925; Kannuru, Bangalore, Kingdom of Mysore
- Died: 19 July 2020 (aged 94–95); Mysore, Karnataka, India
- Occupation: Actress
- Years active: 1956–2015
- Children: 6
- Relatives: B. Jayamma (sister-in-law)

Shanthamma (1925–19 July 2020) was an Indian actress in the Kannada film industry, as well as in Hindi and Tamil, and a theatre artist in Karnataka, India. She was known for playing supporting and character roles.

== Biography ==
Shanthamma was born in Kannuru, a locality in Bangalore of the erstwhile Kingdom of Mysore (in present-day Karnataka) in 1928. Despite initial opposition from her family, she began her career as an actor, first on stage, in 1949. In 1950, while with Gubbi Veeranna's stage company, she married co-actor Anil Kumar, the brother of B. Jayamma and Veeranna's brother-in-law. She had six children with him, the eldest of who, Suma, became an actress. As a child actor, she appeared in Shri Shaila Mahathme (1961). Another daughter Sunanda was also an actress, who quit the profession after appearing in seven films. Shanthamma's family resided in Madras (now Chennai) for 15 years, before moving to Bangalore.

Anil Kumar encouraged Shanthamma to act in films; he would later work a dance teacher in Vinayaka Krishna Gokak's company. Shanthamma made her film debut in 1956 with the Kannada film, Hari Bhakta. She played the role of the mother of Dr. Rajkumar's character, a role she would subsequently play in many of the latter's films. She went on to appear in over 190 films, including in Tamil such as Mullum Malarum (1978), that saw her play the role of mother-in-law of Rajinikanth's character. During the latter part of her career, Shanthamma worked actively in television soaps. Her final screen appearance came in Endendigu (2015).

== Selected filmography ==
- Hari Bhakta (1956)
- Ranadheera Kanteerava (1960)
- Kaiwara Mahathme (1961)
- Mullum Malarum (1978)
- Kaamana Billu (1983)
- Indina Bharatha (1984)
- Bombay Dada (1991)
- Sabarimale
- Bombat Hendthi (1992)
- Rupayi Raja (1993)
- Aakasmika (1993)...Rajeeva
- Chinnari Mutha (1993)
- Karulina Koogu (1994)
- Doni Sagali (1998)
- Kallarali Hoovagi (2006)
- Romeo (2012)
- Alone (2015)

== See also ==
- List of people from Karnataka
- List of Indian film actresses
