= Benkiyalli Aralida Hoovu =

1983 Indian film directed by K. Balachander

- VCD cover
- Directed by: K. Balachander
- Written by: K. Balachander
- Based on: Aval Oru Thodar Kathai by K. Balachander
- Produced by: Chandulal Jain; V. Natarajan
- Starring: Suhasini; Jai Jagadish; Rajeev; Sarath Babu
- Cinematography: B. S. Loknath
- Edited by: N. R. Kittu
- Music by: M. S. Viswanathan
- Release date: 30 September 1983
- Running time: 142 minutes
- Country: India
- Language: Kannada

Benkiyalli Aralida Hoovu ( transl. The flower that bloomed in fire) is a 1983 Indian Kannada-language drama film directed by K. Balachander and produced by Chandulal Jain. It revolves around Kavitha (Suhasini) who wonders when she will have time to live her own life, as she is too busy taking care of her mother, siblings, and her alcoholic brother's family. It was the Kannada debut film of Suhasini.

The film is a remake of Balachander's Tamil film Aval Oru Thodar Kathai (1974). Kamal Haasan, who played a major role in the 1974 film, played a guest role here. Suhasini won the Filmfare Award for Best Actress – Kannada for her performance.

== Plot ==
Kavitha is the sole breadwinner of her family comprising her mother, widowed sister Bharati, an unmarried younger sister, a blind younger brother, a drunkard elder brother Murthy, his wife and children. Her father had abandoned the family and become a monk. Conscious of her family responsibilities, Kavitha keeps postponing her marriage indefinitely to her long-time boyfriend Tilak. Kavitha's friend Chandra takes life easy and keeps changing boyfriends. Tilak, who patiently waits for Kavitha, meets Bharati, pities her and slowly becomes passionate about her. On learning this, Kavitha sacrifices her love and gets them married. Murthy changes his wayward behaviour, becomes responsible and works as a bearer at a restaurant. An impressed Kavitha accepts him as the head of the family. Kavitha's boss Arun Ghosh offers to marry her, but Kavitha does not give him a positive reply.

Chandra dates Chandrasekhar, a womaniser and colleague of Kavitha, despite her warnings. Earlier, when Chandrasekhar had written a love letter to Kavitha, she complained about it to her boss, who then reprimanded Chandrasekhar. Hence, Kavitha does not approve of Chandra's relationship with him. A lustful Chandrasekhar also dates Chandra's widowed mother; on learning this, Chandra attempts suicide. Kavitha and her co-tenant Gopal save Chandra and advise her to marry Gopal. In turn, Chandra advises Kavitha to marry Ghosh. Kavitha accepts the marriage proposal as she now feels confident about Murthy taking care of the family.

On the day of the wedding, Murthy's wife asks him to get back the silver lamp pledged by him earlier, to be gifted to Kavitha for her wedding. While returning to the wedding hall, he seeks a lift from Chandrasekhar, not knowing him. Murthy realises that Chandrasekhar is actually coming to stop the marriage of Kavitha and Chandra when Chandrasekhar states that he had affairs with both of them. Murthy pleads with him not to come to the marriage hall and create any confusion, but Chandrasekhar refuses. A scuffle ensues in which Murthy is killed by Chandrasekhar using the lamp; the police arrest Chandrasekhar. When the marriage is about to take place, Kavitha learns of her brother's death from the police. She then convinces Ghosh to accept her younger sister as the bride as she needs to support her family again. At the same time, Chandra marries Gopal. Kavitha returns to taking care of her family like before.

== Cast ==
- Suhasini as Kavitha
- Jai Jagadish as Tilak
- Ramakrishna as Gopal
- Rajeev as Krishnamurthy
- Sarath Babu as Kavitha's boss
- Vijayalakshmi Singh as Chandra
- Pavithra as Bharati
- Sunder Raj as Chandrashekar
- Leelavathi as Kavitha's mother
- Kamal Haasan as a bus conductor (guest appearance)

== Production ==
Benkiyalli Aralida Hoovu is the Kannada remake of the Tamil film Aval Oru Thodar Kathai (1974). Suhasini played the female lead, and her uncle Kamal Haasan (who appeared in the Tamil original) made a cameo appearance as a bus conductor. Suhasini, a non-Kannada speaker, struggled with one scene requiring her to speak a seemingly complicated dialogue, resulting in it going through over 20 retakes; after the 29th take, Balachander decided to retain that for the sake of Suhasini's health, even though it was still not perfect.

== Soundtrack ==
M. S. Viswanathan composed the music for the soundtracks and lyrics written by Chi. Udaya Shankar. The album consists of five soundtracks.

Track list
No.	Title	Lyrics	Singer(s)	Length
1.	"Taali Kattuva Shubhavele"	Chi. Udaya Shankar	S. P. Balasubrahmanyam	6:26
2.	"Munde Banni"	Chi. Udaya Shankar	S. P. Balasubrahmanyam	4:50
3.	"Benkiyalli Aralida Hoovu"	Chi. Udaya Shankar	Vani Jairam	3:42
4.	"Hogu Ennalu"	Chi. Udaya Shankar	S. P. Balasubrahmanyam	3:58
5.	"Premada Geetheye"	Chi. Udaya Shankar	Vani Jairam	4:43
Total length:				23:29
