= Chandulal Jain =

Indian film director and producer (?-2009)

- Born: J. Chandulal Jain; Padeev ( Rajasthan)
- Died: 17 December 2009; Bangalore
- Occupations: Film director and producer
- Years active: 1971–2009
- Known for: National Award Winner, State government's Lifetime Achievement Award and Kannada Rajyotsava
- Notable work: Thaaye Devaru, Bhootayyana Maga Ayyu, Tabbaliyu Neenade Magane

J. Chandulal Jain was a popular Kannada film director and producer of almost 40 films, notably, Thaaye Devaru, Bhootayyana Maga Ayyu, Tabbaliyu Neenade Magane, and Bhakta Siriyala. He also produced movies in Hindi, such as Godhuli and Pyaar Karke Dekho. His film Idu Saadhya was shot in just 48 hours.

He won a national award for Tabbaliyu Neenade Magane and three Government of Karnataka awards for films Bhootayaana Maga Ayyu, Veerappan, and Gangamma Gangamaayi. He also won the state government's Lifetime Achievement Award and Kannada Rajyotsava for his contributions to the Kannada film industry.

He was instrumental in introducing Kamal Haasan and Rajinikanth to the Kannada film industry.

== Personal details ==
His family originates from Padiv, a town in Rajasthan, and he migrated to Chennai during the 1970s. He married Leela and had two daughters and two sons: Rajakumar and Rohit. He initially started out as a cloth merchant and through close contacts he was able to get in touch with a lot of renowned film personalities - actors and producers - while working in the Davanagere district of Karnataka.

He used to supply imported perfumes and other material to Rajkumar, Kannada thespian. According to Rohit Jain, son of Chandulal, Rajkumar was impressed with Chandulal's fluency in Kannada and encouraged him to produce films in the language. Varadappa, brother of Rajkumar, having become close friend of Chandulal arranged a call sheet of the actors; consequently, Chandulal produced Rajkumar's hit movie Thaayi Devaru.

He died at the age of 75 on 17 December 2009 in Bangalore due to prolonged illness after undergoing several surgeries. He is survived by his wife and all four children.

== Filmography ==
He produced almost 40 films; 35 were in Kannada language as a producer. He was the producer of Thaayi Devaru, in which Rajkumar was a lead actor, and the film was a huge success. He produced 'Tabbaliyu Neenade Magane and Gangavva Gangamaayi, which were financial failures but won critics applause. His three films – Bhootayaana Maga Ayyu, Veerappan, and Gangamma Gangamaayi – won the best film awards from the Karnataka Government.

His Thabbaliyu Neenaade Magane, based on the popular novel by S. L. Byrappa, won the national award for Best Feature Film in Kannada in 1977, which he shared with another co-producer B.M. Venkatesh.

He produced few Hindi movies such as Godhuli starring Naseeruddin Shah and Om Puri; Godhuli won the national Filmfare Awards, which he produced simultaneously with Thabbaliyu Neenaade Magane. Pyaar Karke Dekho with Govinda as a lead actor was another Hindi movie with him as an executive producer.

His last Kannada movie was Bahala Channagide starring Shiv Rajkumar as a hero, while other popular movies were Hemavathi, Praya Praya Praya, Bettele Seve, Jari Bidda Jana, Bhakta Siriyala, Sangrama, Yuddakanda, Yediyur Siddalingeshwara. Bhakta Siriyala was a blockbluster. His Idu Sadhya was shot in a record 48 hours.

He directed a few movies like Jaari Bidda Jaana with Jayanti, Ashok, and Lokesh as cast crew, and produced by Y.R. Swamy. Benkiyalli Aralida Hoovu, a remake of Tamil movie Aval Oru Thodar Kathai, was produced by Chandulal Jain in Kannada language and directed by K. Balachander, won Filmfare Awards to actress Suhasini for her performance.

=== Kannada ===
- Thayi Devaru (1971)
- Bhootayyana Maga Ayyu (1974)
- Tabbaliyu Neenade Magane (1977)
- Bhakta Siriyala (1980)
- Veerappan
- Gangavva Gangamaayi
- Hemavathi
- Jaari Bidda Jaana (1980)
- Narada Vijaya (1980)
- Praya Praya Praya (1981)
- Bettele Seve (1982)
- Sangrama
- Yuddakanda
- Benkiyalli Aralida Hoovu (1983)
- Yediyur Siddalingeshwara
- Idu Saadhya (1989)
- Bahala Chennagide (2001)

=== Hindi ===
- Godhuli (1977)
- Pyaar Karke Dekho (1987)

== Awards ==
- Kannada Rajyotsava Award
- Lifetime Achievement Award from Karnataka state government in 2004–2005

Karnataka State Film Awards

- 1973-74

First Best Film:Boothayyana Maga Ayyu

- 1991-92

First Best Film:Veerappan

- 1994-95

First Best Film:Gangavva Gangamaayi

National Film Awards

- 1977

Best Kannada Film:Thabbaliyu Neenaade Magane

- Filmfare Award for Best Film – Kannada for Tabbaliyu Neenade Magane in 1977

== See also ==
- National Film Award for Best Feature Film in Kannada
- S. L. Bhyrappa#Movies
