= Avala Antharanga =

- Directed by: R. N. Jayagopal
- Produced by: Chamundamma
- Starring: Kalyan Kumar; Aarathi; Roopa Devi; Ashok; Shyam Sunder
- Cinematography: R. N. K. Prasad
- Music by: M. Ranga Rao
- Release date: 1984
- Country: India
- Language: Kannada

Avala Antharanga is a 1984 Indian Kannada-language film directed by R. N. Jayagopal. It stars Roopa Devi, Kalyan Kumar, Ashok and Aarathi in a guest appearance.

== Cast ==
- Roopa Devi
- Kalyan Kumar
- Aarathi (Guest appearance)
- Ashok
- Shyam Sunder
