= Sri Ramanjaneya Yuddha =

- Poster
- Directed by: M.Nageshwara Rao and M. S. Nayak
- Starring: Rajkumar; Udaykumar; K. S. Ashwath; Dikki Madhavarao
- Cinematography: V. Venkat
- Edited by: Bal G. Yadav; M. Thathayya
- Music by: Satyam
- Production company: Amrutha Kala Productions
- Distributed by: Amrutha Kala Productions
- Release date: 17 December 1963
- Country: India
- Language: Kannada

Sri Ramanjaneya Yuddha is a 1963 Indian Kannada-language film, directed by M. Nageshwara Rao and M. S. Nayak. The film stars Rajkumar, Udaykumar, K. S. Ashwath and Dikki Madhavarao. Composer Satyam provided the musical score for this, his debut film. Notably, the title card reveals that this was Rajkumar's 50th film.

The film was remade in Telugu in 1975 as Sri Ramanjaneya Yuddham starring N. T. Rama Rao.

== Cast ==
- Dr. Rajkumar
- Udaykumar
- K. S. Ashwath
- Dikki Madhava Rao
- B. Raghavendra Rao
- H. R. Shastry
- Pandari Bai
- Advani Lakshmi Devi
- Jayanthi
- M. Jayashree
- Baby Amruthakala
- Baby Padmini
- Rajendra Krishna
- Suryakumar
- Vidyasagar
- Narasimhaiah
- Shivaji Rao
- Srikantaswamy
- Sando Krishna
- Master Gopal
- Kumari Chandrakala
- Kumari Usha

== Soundtrack ==
The music was composed by Chellapilla Satyam.

No.	Song	Singers	Lyrics	Length (m:ss)
1	"Jagadeeshanaaduva"	P. B. Sreenivas	Geetha Priya	03:32
