= Haalu Jenu =

1982 Kannada film by Singeetham Srinivasa Rao

- Poster
- Directed by: Singeetham Srinivasa Rao
- Screenplay by: Singeetham Srinivasa Rao
- Story by: P. Padmaraju
- Dialogues by: Chi. Udayashankar
- Produced by: Parvathamma Rajkumar
- Starring: Rajkumar; Madhavi; Roopa Devi
- Cinematography: S. V. Srikanth
- Edited by: P. Bhaktavatsalam
- Music by: G. K. Venkatesh
- Production company: Poornima Enterprises
- Release date: 27 May 1982
- Running time: 157 min
- Country: India
- Language: Kannada

Haalu Jenu ( censor certified: Halu Jenu; transl. Milk and Honey) is a 1982 Indian Kannada-language tragicomedy film directed by Singeetham Srinivasa Rao, starring Rajkumar, Madhavi and Roopa Devi. The movie is famous for its evergreen songs, which were composed by G. K. Venkatesh. The movie was remade in Telugu in 1985 as Illale Devata.

Parvathamma Rajkumar paid ₹1 lakhs for the story when a movie based on that story which was supposed to star Anant Nag failed to go on floors. Haalu Jenu was known for its 70-foot (21 m)-tall cutout poster of Rajkumar placed in the Santosh Theatre in Majestic, Bangalore. The film was a major success at the box office upon its release and had a theatrical run of 35 weeks. The movie, however, was removed from some cinemas after 22 weeks (150 days) to make room for Chalisuva Modagalu which was also directed by Singeetham Srinivasa Rao and starred Rajkumar.

The tabloid Trade Guide started by Taran Adarsh's father had published a report calling Rajkumar a Junior Hitler for the alleged theatre unavailability for Amitabh Bachchan's Namak Halaal which released around the same time, enraging Kannada movie buffs. Finally, Amitabh Bachchan flew down to Bangalore and met Rajkumar to clear the air of misunderstandings.

Saritha, who had earlier worked with Rajkumar on Keralida Simha and Hosa Belaku, dubbed for Madhavi in some parts in this movie. Saritha went on to dub a Telugu movie by the same director - Mayuri. Saritha was one of the lead heroines in Rajkumar - Singeetham's immediate next movie Chalisuva Modagalu which released in the same year.

This was also Singeetham Srinivasa Rao's directorial debut in Kannada. He went on to work with Rajkumar in six more movies including his 200th movie, and was also the director of the debut movies of his two sons.

== Plot ==
Ranga (Dr. Rajkumar), a middle-class working man and is happily married to Kamala (Madhavi). Their newly wed life gets disrupted one day when Kamala falls unconscious on the floor. Ranga takes her to the hospital and doctor perform the blood test. After analyzing the reports, the doctor reveals that Kamala has blood cancer and consoles Ranga to take good care of her till her last breath. Shattered Ranga, blindly believes that he can save Kamala's life and spends most of his savings for her medical care.

One afternoon, Ranga notices Meena (Roopa Devi), a young woman on the road and she is surrounded by men who are blackmailing her to pay compensation for a staged accident. With smartness, Ranga somehow manages to saves her from them instead of putting a fight. He already knew about Meena, the daughter of Shaanthamma (Dubbing Janaki), who come from a rich family. With a sense of gratitude, Meena takes Ranga to her house and introduces him to her mother. Ranga lie to convince them that he is also from a rich family. He thinks Shaanthamma could be source for money for his wife's treatment. He soon learns the weaknesses of the family members. Meanwhile, Meena develops crush on Ranga and tries many ways to express her feelings for him. But, Ranga intentionally avoids her without causing any hurt.

One day at the hospital, Ranga hears of Dr. Varma, a famous oncologist. He asks his friend Dr. Subbu (Shrinagar Nagaraj) to arrange an appointment with Varma, for which he needs ₹20,000. He arranges the amount by selling Gopalayya's car, after when he cheated on him. Kamala and Ranga head to Bombay to meet Dr. Varma (R. N. Sudarshan). After conducting the check up, Varma issues a treatment instruction letter for Dr. Subbu via Ranga.

Gopalayya enters Shaanthamma's house with lawyer Baratlaw (M. S. Umesh) to grab her property by holding a power of attorney letter in hand that has been signed by Prahalad. Ranga enlightens lawyer Baratlaw by exposing the cheating nature of Gopalayya. After knowing the truth, Baratlaw tears off the power of attorney letter and kicks Gopalayya out of Shanthamma's house under Ranga's direction.

One day, Ranga is called for a marriage proposal with by Meena's family. With no way left, Ranga escapes by saying "According to his horoscope, the one who marries him will die sooner". After saying it, he remembers of Kamala and with fear he rushes to the hospital and tells her that he rejected the proposal. But Kamala was not happy with his action.

Soon after, Meena leaves her house and decides to live in Ranga's place when her mother wants to marry her for Baratlaw. Meena's father Ugra Narasimha (Shakti Prasad) visits Ranga's house to tell his family's secret about raising a boy, the son of his expired Sita (Shanthamma's first daughter), and thus he express his inability to pay convent fees from his wife due to Baratlaw. Ranga promises him that he will take care of paying the boy's convent fees. After the fee payment, with permission Ranga takes the boy with him to his house to trick Meena into thinking that he is widower father of the boy. Meena accepts this lie, but she is still happy to be like a mother for the boy. The next day, Ranga returns the boy to the convent. After a heated argument, Ranga slaps Meena which will make her leave the house and continues to follow her mother's decision of marrying Baratlaw. Ranga tells Kamala about what happened, but she feels bad about him hurting Meena. During this conversation, a nurse in the next bed hears about Shanthamma and suddenly she starts to ask "Are you talking about the rich lady, Shanthamma". Further, the nurse explains the story of cheated and impregnated Sita who dies after delivering a baby. The child is being raised by Ugranarasimha. She gives a couple photo to Ranga which has the picture of Sita and the guy who cheated on her.

On Meena's wedding day, Ranga enters to the marriage hall with the boy and reveals the boy's father is Baratlaw. He hand over the boy to Shanthamma's family and Gopalayya kicks out Baratlaw and his father from the hall.

A few days later, Dr. Subbu calls Ranga saying they moved Kamala to the intensive care unit and mention an operation that is conducted under Dr. Varma's supervision. He asks Ranga to arrange money for operation quickly. After a refusal from Baddi Basappa, Ranga heads to Shaanthamma, asking for ₹10,000 as it is urgently needed. At the doorstep, Ranga's haters brainwash Shaanthamma from giving money. Shaanthamma orders Ranga to move out. At the same time, Kamala's health deteriorates. Understanding Ranga would be miserable, Meena gives him the money and asks the reason. He takes her to the hospital, where he finds doctors standing still and Kamala holding her last breath for Ranga's arrival. Her last words reflect on Ranga and Meena marrying each other and Kamala asks Ranga to sing the phrase "Dehavu Naanu Pranavu Neenu" ("I am the body, You are the life"). Kamala dies after completing the song.

== Cast ==
Actor	Role
Rajkumar	Ranga
Madhavi	Kamala
Roopa Devi	Meena
Dubbing Janaki	Shaanthamma
Thoogudeepa Srinivas	Baddi Basappa
Chi. Udaya Shankar	Officer
Shivaram	Gopalraaya
Cudavalli Chandrashekar	Prahlad
Musuri Krishnamurthy	Marriage broker
Shringar Nagaraj	Doctor
Shakti Prasad	Ugranarasimha, Meena's father
M. S. Umesh	Lawyer Baratlaw
Shani Mahadevappa	

== Soundtrack ==
The music and background score was composed by G. K. Venkatesh and the lyrics were penned by Chi. Udaya Shankar. One of Purandara Dasa's keerthane Pogaadirelo Ranga was also used in the movie. As of 2023, the song Aaneya Mele was reported to have ranked high on Spotify’s Kannada songs list.

Haalu Jenu

Soundtrack album by G. K. Venkatesh
- Released: 1982
- Recorded: 1982
- Genre: Feature film soundtrack
- Length: 22:13
- Language: Kannada
- Label: Sangeetha
- Director: G. K. Venkatesh

Track #	Song	Singer(s)	Lyrics
1	"Aaneya Mele"	Rajkumar, Sulochana	Chi. Udaya Shankar
2	"Haayagi Kulithiru Neenu"	Rajkumar, Saritha	Chi. Udaya Shankar
3	"Baalu Belakayithu"	Rajkumar	Chi. Udaya Shankar
4	"Haalu Jenu Ondada Haage"	Rajkumar	Chi. Udaya Shankar
5	"Pogaadirelo Ranga"	S. Janaki	Purandara Dasa

== Awards ==
- Karnataka State Film Awards
1. Best Film - Parvathamma Rajkumar and Singeetam Srinivasa Rao
2. Best Actor - Rajkumar
3. Best Editing - P. Bhaktavatsalam
