= Benki Birugali (1984 film) =

1984 Indian film directed by Thiptur Raghu

- Directed by: Thiptur Raghu
- Written by: Somu
- Screenplay by: Thiptur Raghu
- Story by: Thiptur Raghu
- Produced by: H. V. Sowbhagya
- Starring: Vishnuvardhan; Shankar Nag; Jayanthi; Jayamala
- Cinematography: V. K. Kannan
- Edited by: K. Balu
- Music by: M. Ranga Rao
- Production company: Shakthi Movies
- Distributed by: Shakthi Movies
- Release date: 19 June 1984
- Running time: 128 minutes
- Country: India
- Language: Kannada

Benki Birugali ( transl. Firestorm) is a 1984 Indian Kannada-language film, directed by Thiptur Raghu and produced by H. V. Sowbhagya. It stars Vishnuvardhan, Shankar Nag, Jayanthi and Jayamala. Music was composed by M. Ranga Rao. It is a remake of the 1968 Bengali film Apanjan. This film was a failure at the box office.

== Cast ==
- Vishnuvardhan as Vishnu
- Shankar Nag as Shankar
- Jayanthi as Parvathi
- Jayamala as Jyothi
- Jai Jagadish
- Cudavalli Chandrashekar as Chandrashekar
- Sundar Raj as Sundar
- Sudheer
- Maanu as Ramesh
- Arikesari
- Dinesh
- Shivaram as Aithal
- Musuri Krishnamurthy as Subbayya Setty
- M. S. Umesh as Umesh
- Shakti Prasad
- Dheerendra Gopal
- Bramhavar
- Tomato Somu
- Somu
- Mysore Lokesh
- Raviraj
- M. S. Karanth
- Master Manjunath as Raja
- Anuradha
- Rekha Rao
- Hemalatha
- Ananthalakshmi
- Mangala
- Baby Shobha

== Soundtrack ==
The music was composed by M. Ranga Rao.

No.	Song	Singers	Lyrics	Length (m:ss)
1	"Thayi Irada Thabbali Navu"	Bengaluru Latha, Sulochana	Doddarange Gowda	04:18
2	"Anuraaga Geetheyali"	Vishnuvardhan	Chi. Udayashankar	04:46
3	"Nammoora Beediyalli"	Vishnuvardhan	Doddarange Gowda	04:51
4	"Helalarenu"	K. J. Yesudas, Vani Jairam	Doddarange Gowda	04:21
5	"Urvashige Vayassaytu"	Vani Jairam	Chi. Udayashankar	03:59
