= Roopa (actress) =

Indian actress (born 1960)

- Born: Hyderabad, Telangana, India
- Other name: Roopa Devi
- Occupation: Actress
- Years active: 1980–1990; 2005–present
- Mother: Advani Lakshmi Devi

Roopa, known as Roopa Devi is an Indian actress who has acted in Kannada, Tamil, Telugu and Malayalam films. She is the daughter of Kalyanam Raghuramaiah and veteran actress Advani Lakshmi Devi. She became famous as the debutante heroine of the tragic romantic film Oru Thalai Ragam in Tamil that ran for 365 days in which she was paired with newcomer Shankar. She has starred in Kannada, Tamil, Telugu and Malayalam movies during the 1980s. For her performance in the movie Avala Antharanga, Roopa won the Karnataka State Film Award for Best Actress in 1984–85.

== Career ==
Roopa Devi mainly worked in Kannada movies during the 1980s. She debuted as a heroine in the experimental film Kamala in 1979 and the role of a prostitute brought her wide acclaim. She entered commercial cinema in 1980 with Simha Jodi in which she played Vishnuvardhan's sister. She was the first choice for second lead and supporting roles in Kannada movies during 1983–87. Her prominent Kannada movies include Haalu Jenu, Mullina Gulabi, Bandhana, Avala Antharanga, Marali Goodige, Trishoola, Aahuthi, Dharma and Bala Nouke. She won the Karnataka State Film Award for Best Actress (1984–85) for her stellar performance in Avala Antharanga.

She has worked with almost all leading Kannada actors of her time including Dr.Rajkumar, Kalyan Kumar, Vishnuvardhan, Srinath, Ambareesh, Anant Nag, Shankar Nag and Ashok. She was romantically paired with matinee idol Dr.Rajkumar in Haalu Jenu, Samayada Gombe and Yarivanu which were all huge successes critically and commercially. She stopped acting after 1989. Almost twenty years later she returned to the silver screen with Ganga Kaveri in 2008. In 2011 she acted in Jarasandha as the mother of hero Duniya Vijay.

Dr.Rajkumar holds the distinction of having played the hero to both Roopa Devi and her mother Advani Lakshmi Devi (in Sri Ramanjaneya Yuddha)

== Filmography ==
Year	Film	Role	Language	Notes
1978	Naalaaga Endaro		Telugu	
1978	Prema Paga		Telugu	
1978	Radha Krishna		Telugu	
1979	Kalikkoil Kabali		Tamil	
1979	Pakka Kalla	Roopa	Kannada	
1979	Kamala		Kannada	
1980	Oru Thalai Ragam	Subhadra	Tamil	
1980	Theekkadal		Malayalam	
1980	Hridhayam Paadunnu		Malayalam	
1980	Andharangam Oomaiyanathu	Rathi	Tamil	
1980	Ambalavilakku	Geetha	Malayalam	
1980	Pappu	Herself	Malayalam	
1980	Moogaku Matosthe		Telugu	
1980	Vasantha Azhaippugal	Roopa	Tamil	
1980	Simha Jodi		Kannada	
1981	Sneham Oru Pravaham		Malayalam	
1981	Aambalppoovu		Malayalam	
1981	Vazhikal Yaathrakkar		Malayalam	
1981	Mayil		Tamil	
1981	Adugal Nanaigindrana		Tamil	
1981	Kanneer Pookkal		Tamil	
1981	Aambalppoovu		Malayalam	
1981	Avasarakari		Tamil	
1981	Mouna Yuddham		Tamil	
1981	Engamma Maharani		Tamil	
1981	Andru Muthal Indru Varai		Tamil	
1982	Echchil Iravugal		Tamil	
1982	Enikkum Oru Divasam	Molykutty	Malayalam	
1982	Kanavugal Karpanaigal		Tamil	
1982	Haalu Jenu	Meena	Kannada	
1982	Mullina Gulabi	Radha	Kannada	
1982	Raagam Thedum Pallavi		Tamil	
1982	Nadamaadum Silaigal		Tamil	
1982	Budi Muchida Kenda		Kannada	
1982	Thunaivi		Tamil	
1982	Pratigna	Sarada	Telugu	
1982	Chilanthivala	Sarada	Malayalam	
1983	Pallaankuzhi	Devu	Malayalam	
1983	Rangula Kala		Telugu	
1983	Gayathri Maduve		Kannada	
1983	Nyaya Gedditu	Jyothi	Kannada	
1984	Bandhana		Kannada	
1984	Shiva Kanye		Kannada	
1984	Yarivanu		Kannada	
1984	Avala Antharanga		Kannada	Karnataka State Film Award for Best Actress
1984	Pavithra Prema		Kannada	
1984	Maryade Mahalu		Kannada	
1984	Marali Goodige		Kannada	
1984	Samayada Gombe	Gowri	Kannada	
1984	Maha Purusha		Kannada	
1984	Yarivanu		Kannada	
1985	Dharma		Kannada	
1985	Bangalore Rathriyalli		Kannada	
1985	Thrishula		Kannada	
1985	Bettada Hoovu	Healthcare worker	Kannada	Special Appearance
1985	Aahuti		Kannada	
1985	Koodum Thedi		Malayalam	
1985	Aalaapana		Telugu	
1986	Nenapina Doni		Kannada	
1986	Ratha Sapthami		Kannada	
1987	Shiva Bhaktha Markandeya		Kannada	
1987	Hanthakudi Veta		Telugu	
1987	Jaganmatha		Telugu	
1987	Bala Nouke		Kannada	
1988	Daasi		Telugu	
1988	Samyuktha	Samyuktha	Kannada	
1989	Bhadrachitta		Malayalam	
1989	Gandandre Gandu		Kannada	
1990	Appu	Remani	Malayalam	
1990	Paattukku Naan Adimai	Ramarajan sister	Tamil	
1994	Police Alludu	Janaki	Telugu	
1995	Tapassu		Telugu	
1995	Real Hero		Telugu	
2001	Inspector Vikram		Telugu	
2005	Karnana Sampattu		Kannada	Delayed for 18 years
2006	Kamli		Telugu	
2008	Ganga Kaveri	Arjun's mother	Kannada	
2009	Shh...	Occult practitioner	Telugu	
2010	Mathe Mungaru		Kannada	
2011	Jarasandha		Kannada	
2012	Krishnam Vande Jagadgurum		Telugu	
2015	Asura		Telugu	
2024	Rakshana		Telugu	

=== Television ===
Year	Title	Role	Network
1997–2000	Ruthuragalu	Sarada	DD Saptagiri
