= Uma Shivakumar =

Indian actress

- Born: November 1, 1941; Bangalore, Kingdom of Mysore, British India
- Died: 25 June 2013 (aged 71); Bangalore, India
- Other name: Baddi Bangaramma
- Occupation: Actress

Uma Shivakumar (c. 1941 – 25 June 2013) was an Indian film and theatre character actress, whose career included roles in more than 170 Kannada language films and more than 30 plays. She was nicknamed "Baddi Bangaramma" by audiences, after the popular 1984 film of the same name, in which she portrayed a moneylender.

== Early life ==
Uma was born in Bangalore. She initially worked as a classical musician, before transitioning to amateur theatre during the 1970s. She appeared in more than 30 plays and theatre productions, according to Sreenivas G. Kappanna, who called her ‛an elder sister of theatre.’ Her most famous role included the satirical play, Muhammad bin Tughluq, in which she played the title character Tughluq's stepmother.

== Career ==
Uma Shivakumar made her film debut in Vamsha Vriksha, a 1971 feature directed by B. V. Karanth and Girish Karnad. Her second film role was in the 1973 Kannada black-and-white film, Kaadu, which was also directed by Girish Karnad. Uma appeared in small films prior to 1973. Her first commercial film was Kesarina Kamala, released in 1973. She appeared in films like Shravana Banthu, College Ranga, Nodi Swamy Navirodu Heege etc.

Uma appeared in more than 170 Kannada films, many released in the 1970s and 1980s. She won the Karnataka State Film Award for Best Supporting Actress for her role in Chandanada Gombe in 1979.

She also worked for the Department of Information and Department of Tourism, along with other Kanada actors and writers, including Lokesh, C. R. Simha, B. R. Nagesh, and Sreenivas G. Kappanna. Uma later owned and operated a Chamrajpet beauty and hair salon, "Baddi Bangaramma Beauty Parlour," where she worked during her later life.

== Death ==
On 25 June 2013, at the age of 71, Uma Shivakumar died from diabetic complications and age related problems at her residence in Chamrajpet, Bangalore.
