= Jai Jagadish =

Indian actor, producer and director (born 1954)

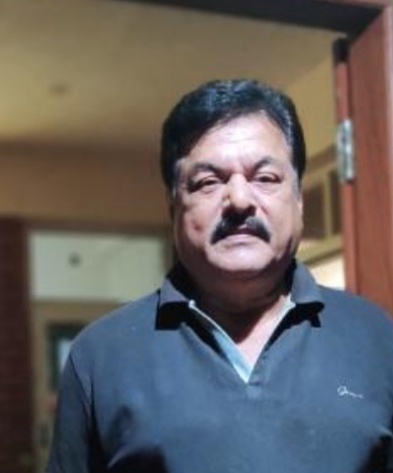
- Occupations: Actor, director, producer
- Years active: 1976-present

Jai Jagadish (born 19 June 1954) is an Indian actor, producer and director from the Kannada film industry. Starting his career as hero in Phalitamsha (1976), he went on to feature in over 300 films as an actor. Some of his most notable films include Gaali Maathu (1981), Garjane (1981), Benkiyalli Aralida Hoovu (1983), Bandhana (1984) and Madhuve Madu Tamashe Nodu (1984) among others.

In 1990, he turned producer with Rani Maharani and has produced many successful movies like Bhoomi Thayiya Chochchala Maga and Kothigalu Saar Kothigalu won the Filmfare Award for Best film. In 2006 he debuted as director with Madana.

== Personal life ==
He hails from Somwarpet Coorg. He has a daughter Arpita from his first wife Roopa. Later he married Vijayalakshmi Singh with whom he has 3 daughters - Vaibhavi and twins Vaisiri & Vainidhi.

== Filmography ==
=== Actor ===
==== Films ====
- Phalitamsha (1976)
- Paduvaaralli Pandavaru (1978)
- Aarada Gaaya (1980)
- Biligiriya Banadalli (1980)
- Simha Jodi (1980) as Chandru
- Point Parimala (1980)
- Bhagyavantha (1981)
- Preetisi Nodu (1981)
- Garjane (1981)
- Gaali Maathu (1981)
- Prema Pallavi (1981)
- Ajith (1982) as Madan
- Mullina Gulabi (1982)
- Maanasa Sarovara (1982)...Madan (cameo)
- Benkiyalli Aralida Hoovu (1983)
- Dharani Mandala Madhyadolage (1983)
- Simha Gharjane (1983)...Vijay
- Samarpane (1983)
- Bandhana (1984)
- Pralayanthaka (1984)
- Baddi Bangaramma (1984)
- Huli Hejje (1984) as Manjunath
- Benki Birugali (1984)
- Naane Raja (1984)
- Madhuve Madu Tamashe Nodu (1984)
- Pithamaha (1985)
- Guri (1986)
- Manithanin Marupakkam (1986) - Tamil film
- Mandhira Punnagai (1986) - Tamil film
- Neruppu Nila (1987) - Tamil film
- Aaseya Bale (1987)
- Mathrudevobhava (1988)
- Ranadheera (1988)
- Mathru Vathsalaya (1988)...Jaisimha
- Thayigobba Tharle Maga (1989)
- Onti Salaga (1989)...Soori aka Chandra Chakravarthy
- Ranabheri (1990)...'Gun' Govinda
- Sididedda Gandu (1990)...Avinash
- Rani Maharani (1990)
- Policena Hendthi (1990)
- Prathap (1990)...Jaggu
- Kalla Malla (1991)
- Rowdy & MLA (1991)
- Mannina Doni (1992)...Jagadish
- Nagaradalli Nayakaru (1992)
- Prema Sangama (1992)
- Hoovu Hannu (1993)
- Chikkejamanru (1993)
- Hrudaya Bandhana (1993)...Dr. Prakash
- Bhagavan Sri Saibaba (1993)...Chand Patil
- Gandugali (1994)
- Himapatha (1995)
- Samara (1995)
- Mana Midiyithu (1995)
- Karulina Kudi (1995)
- Mungarina Minchu (1997)
- Bhoomi Thayiya Chochchala Maga (1998)
- Idu Entha Premavayya (1999)
- O Premave (1999)
- Hagalu Vesha (2000)
- Astra (2000)
- Shaapa (2001)
- Kothigalu Saar Kothigalu (2001)
- Majestic (2002)
- Don (2003)
- Katthegalu Saar Katthegalu (2003)
- Sri Ram (2003)
- Love (2004)
- Kanchana Ganga (2004)
- Swamy (2005)
- Madana (2006) - also director
- Mungaru Male (2006)
- Ee Bandhana (2007; also producer)
- Moggina Manasu (2008)
- Love Guru (2009)
- Mr. Painter (2009)
- Male Barali Manju Irali (2009; also producer)
- Crazy Kutumba (2010)
- Thamassu (2010)
- Krishnan Marriage Story (2011)
- Sanju Weds Geetha (2011)
- Kemepegowda (2011)
- Ondu Kshanadalli (2012)
- Gokula Krishna (2012)
- Ambara (2013)
- Aane Pataaki (2013)
- Barfi (2013)
- Sweety Nanna Jodi (2013)
- Brindavana (2013)
- Varadhanayaka (2013)
- Dashamukha (2013)
- Jinke Mari (2013)
- Myna (2013)
- Bachchan (2013)
- Angaaraka (2014)
- Bahaddur (2014)
- Ugramm (2014)
- Dilwala (2014)
- Drishya (2014)
- Brahma (2014)
- Power (2014)
- Simhadri (2014)
- Dove (2015)
- Octopus (2015)
- Shutterdulai (2016) - Tulu
- Hey Sarasu (2016)
- March 22 (2017)
- Porki Huccha Venkat (2017)
- Ambi Ning Vayassaytho (2018)
- Viraaj (2018)
- Missing Boy (2019)
- I Love You (2019)
- Tom And Jerry (2021)
- Raktha Kashmira (2026) as Special appearance in song

==== Television ====
- Chi Sou Savitri
- Aramane (2016–2018)
- Sanju Mattu Naanu (2017)
- Kasthuri Nivasa (2019–2020)
- Bigg Boss Kannada season 7 (2019–2020)
- Jothe Jotheyali (2022)

=== Director ===
- Madana (2006)

=== Producer ===
- Rani Maharani (1990)
- Hoovu Hannu (1993)
- Mungarina Minchu (1997)
- Bhoomi Thayiya Chochchala Maga (1998)
- O Premave (1999)
- Kurigalu Saar Kurigalu (2001)
- Kothigalu Saar Kothigalu (2002)
- Katthegalu Saar Katthegalu (2003)
- Kanchana Ganga (2004)
- Aadi (2005)
- Ee Bandhana (2006)
- Vaare Vah (2010)
- Ondu Kshanadalli (2012)
