= Sadashiva Brahmavar =

Indian actor

- Born: 1928; Belagavi, British India (Present-day Karnataka, India)
- Died: 19 September 2018 (aged 89–90); Bengaluru, Karnataka
- Occupations: Film actor; theatre actor
- Years active: 1977–2017
- Children: 2

Sadashiva Brahmavar (1928–2018), known as Brahmavar, was an Indian actor who appeared in Kannada films. He is best known for his supporting roles in such movies including Guri (1986), Samyuktha (1988) and Sri Manjunatha (2001).

== Personal life ==
Native to Brahmavar in Udupi, Sadashiva was born and raised in Bailhongal, Belagavi. He had a son and daughter. Sadashiva made news in 2017 when he found roaming alone in Kumta city and many local people offered him help. He reunited with his children later.

== Career ==
Sadashiva started his career as an actor in theatre. He was noticed by filmmaker Siddalingaiah who offered Sadashiv a role in his film Hemavathi in 1977. He went on to appear in supporting roles of teacher, father, priest and watchman. In few movies like Samyuktha, Garuda Dhwaja and Nigooda Rahasya he played villain roles also. Starting from Hemavathi in 1977 till his last movie Bangara s/o Bangarada Manushya in 2017, Brahmavar has acted nearly 150 movies in Kannada.

== Death ==
Brahmavar died on 19 September 2018 due to age related ailments, including dementia. He was 90. As per the actor's wish, his death news was announced a day after his cremation, held at Banashankari crematorium, to avoid media glare.

== Selected filmography ==
- Hemavathi (1977)
- Ranganayaki (1981)
- Kamanabillu (1983)
- Samayada Gombe (1984)
- Eradu Rekhegalu (1984)
- Dhruva Thare (1985)
- Bettada Hoovu (1985)
- Anuraga Aralithu (1986)
- Kaliyuga Bheema (1991)
- Gruha Pravesha (1991)
- Bhagavan Sri Saibaba (1993)...Mahalsapathi
- Sri Manjunatha (2001)
- Kanasembo Kudureyaneri (2010)
- My Memories (Short Film; 2013)
- Patharagitthi (2015)
- Bangara s/o Bangarada Manushya (2017)
