= List of Kannada films of 1972 =

== Top-grossing films ==
Rank	Title	Collection	Ref.
1.	Bangarada Manushya	₹3 crore (₹152 crore in 2025)	
2.	Naagarahavu	₹2 crore (₹102 crore in 2025)	

== Released films ==
The following is a list of films produced in the Kannada film industry in India in 1972, presented in alphabetical order.

Title	Director	Cast	Music
Bala Panjara	M. R. Vittal	Pandari Bai, Shylashri, K. S. Ashwath, Ranga	Vijaya Bhaskar
Bandhavya	Ratnakar - Madhu	Rajesh, Gangadhar, Pandari Bai, B. V. Radha	R. Rathna
Bangaarada Manushya	Siddalingaiah	Dr. Rajkumar, Bharathi, Balakrishna, Vajramuni, Srinath, Aarathi, B. V. Radha	G. K. Venkatesh
Bhale Huchcha	Y. R. Swamy	Rajkumar, Aarathi, Srinath, B. V. Radha	Rajan–Nagendra
Bhale Rani	Vijaya Satyam	Srinath, Ramesh, Chi. Udaya Shankar, Pandari Bai, Prasanna Rani	V. Sathya Rao
Hrudaya Sangama	Ramnath - Shivram	Rajkumar, Bharathi, K. S. Ashwath, Pandari Bai	Vijaya Bhaskar
Jaga Mecchida Maga	Hunsur Krishnamurthy	Rajkumar, Bharathi, M. P. Shankar, K. S. Ashwath	Satyam
Janma Rahasya	S. P. N. Krishna	Rajkumar, Bharathi, K. S. Ashwath, Dwarakish	M. Ranga Rao
Jeevana Jokali	Geethapriya	Gangadhar, Bharathi, Balakrishna	Vijaya Bhaskar
Kranti Veera	R. Ramamurthy	Rajkumar, Jayanthi, Rajesh	Satyam
Kulla Agent 000	K. S. L. Swamy	Dwarakish, Jaya, Vajramuni	Rajan–Nagendra
Mareyada Deepavali	R. Sampath	Rajesh, Kalpana, K. S. Ashwath, Sampath	Vijaya Bhaskar
Naa Mechida Huduga	R. N. Jayagopal	Srinath, Ramesh, Kalpana, K. S. Ashwath	Vijaya Bhaskar
Naagarahaavu	Puttanna Kanagal	Vishnuvardhan, Aarathi, K. S. Ashwath, Leelavathi, Shubha, Shivaram	Vijaya Bhaskar
Nanda Gokula	Y. R. Swamy	Rajkumar, Jayanthi, Leelavathi, K. S. Ashwath	Vijaya Bhaskar
Nari Munidare Mari	Geethapriya	Kalpana, Udaykumar, Narasimharaju	Rajan–Nagendra
Sipayi Ramu	Y. R. Swamy	Rajkumar, Aarathi, Leelavathi, Thoogudeepa Srinivas, K. S. Ashwath	Upendra Kumar
Subhadra Kalyana	Kanagal Prabhakar Shastry	Gangadhar, Kalpana, Narasimharaju, Rajesh	S. M. Subbaiah Naidu
Triveni	M. N. Prasad	Uday Kumar, Kalpana, Narasimharaju	Upendra Kumar
Uttara Dakshina	Vijaya Satyam	Kalpana, Ramesh, Pandari Bai, Udaya Chandrika	M. Ranga Rao
Vamsha Vriksha	B. V. Karanth; Girish Karnad	Girish Karnad, Vishnuvardhan, Sharada	Bhaskar Chandavarkar
Yaara Sakshi	M. R. Vittal	Manjula, Sampath, G. V. Shivanand, M. Mahadev	G. K. Venkatesh
Yaava Janmada Maitri	Geethapriya	Gangadhar, Kalpana, Narasimharaju, Vaishali Kasaravalli	Vijaya Bhaskar

== Dr. Rajkumar Movies ==
Bangaarada Manushya

Bhale Huchcha

Nanda Gokula

Kranti Veera

Janma Rahasya

Hrudaya Sangama

Sipayi Ramu

Jaga Mecchida Maga

== See also ==
- Kannada films of 1971
- Kannada films of 1973
