= Kranti Veera =

- Directed by: R. Ramamurthy
- Screenplay by: K. V. Srinivasan
- Story by: R. Rangarajan
- Produced by: R. Ramamurthy
- Starring: Rajkumar; Jayanthi; Dwarakish
- Cinematography: B. Dorairaj
- Edited by: R. Ramamurthy
- Music by: Satyam
- Production company: Sri Rama Enterprise
- Release date: 1972
- Running time: 163 minutes
- Country: India
- Language: Kannada

Kranti Veera is a 1972 Indian Kannada-language action drama film directed and produced by R. Ramamurthy. It stars Rajkumar, Rajesh and Jayanthi. The film's story was written by R. Rangarajan and Satyam was the soundtrack and score composer. The dialogues and lyrics were written by Chi. Udaya Shankar. The song Elli harikatha prasangavo had P. B. Sreenivas and Rajkumar playback singing together for the first time. However, Rajkumar was not credited as a singer in the title card.

The film is a classic case of visual representation of political transition from monarchy to democracy. The film reminds of princely India which existed in colonial India. The film acquires its political tone thanks to its theme which remind us of political history of Mysore and other princely states of Karnataka. The film had a theatrical run of 100 days according to the Kannada book, Vishwamanava Dr. Rajkumar.

== Cast ==
- Rajkumar as Vijay and Prince ChandraKumar
- Jayanthi as Tara
- Rajesh as Madhava
- Dinesh as Dewan Martanda
- Ranga
- Sampath
- Vajramuni
- Dwarakish
- H. R. Shastry as Tara's father
- Keshavamurthy
- Ramamurthy
- Joker Shyam
- Shivaji Rao
- Siddaramaiah
- Shailendra
- Narayan
- Rama Rao
- B. V. Radha

== Soundtrack ==
The music of the film was composed by Satyam and lyrics for the soundtrack written by Chi. Udaya Shankar.

=== Track list ===
| # | Title | Singer(s) |
|---|---|---|
| 1 | "Yaaru Enu Maduvaru" | P. B. Sreenivas |
| 2 | "Kaniveya Kelagina" | P. B. Sreenivas, P. Susheela |
| 3 | "Molagali Molagali" | S. P. Balasubrahmanyam, Mahadevan, B. Vasantha |
| 4 | "Karinaaga Marinaaga" | L. R. Eswari |
| 5 | "Harikathe" | P. B. Sreenivas, Rajkumar |

== See also ==
- Kannada films of 1972
