= Bangaarada Manushya =

- Film Poster
- Directed by: S. Siddalingaiah
- Written by: Hunsur Krishnamurthy (dialogues)
- Screenplay by: S. Siddalingaiah
- Based on: Bangaarada Manushya by T. K. Rama Rao
- Produced by: R. Lakshman; Gopal
- Starring: Dr. Rajkumar; Bharathi; Aarathi; Srinath; Advani Lakshmi Devi; Loknath; Dwarakish; Vajramuni
- Cinematography: D. V. Rajaram
- Edited by: P. Bhaktavatsalam
- Music by: G. K. Venkatesh
- Production company: Kanteerava Studio
- Release date: 31 March 1972
- Running time: 174 minutes
- Country: India
- Language: Kannada

Bangaarada Manushya ( transl. Golden Man) is a 1972 Indian Kannada language film based on T. K. Rama Rao's novel of same name. Ramarao was known for his crime and detective novels, but this film was a social drama. It was directed by S. Siddalingaiah under the banner Srinidhi Productions. Prior to this, Siddalingaiah had worked with Dr. Rajkumar in Mayor Muthanna, Baalu Belagithu, Namma Samsara, Thayi Devaru, Nyayave Devaru. It stars Dr. Rajkumar and Bharathi.

The film was screened for over two years at the States Theatre (now Bhumika Theatre) in Bangalore and was screened for sixty weeks in Chamundeshwari theatre in Mysore, the film completed one year in many centres and twenty five weeks in every major and minor centre. The movie saw a 25 weeks run when it was re-released in 1988. Bangaarada Manushya is an iconic all-time classic in Kannada Cinema, according to many movie buffs. Bangaarada Manushya was an Industry Hit at the box office.

The film was produced by R. Lakshman and Gopal, the film set new standards in the production design. Breaking away from conventional movie making, the producers preferred an open discussion with the crew and preliminary survey of outdoor shooting venues. While Lakshman was a Kannada activist closely associated with a league of frontline writers such as A.N. Krishna Rao and M.N. Murthy and managing the famous Bharat Talkies on the J.C. Road, Gopal was his close associate with a penchant for cinema. Most of the film was shot in Kalasa village in Chikmagalur district.

The music for the film was composed by G. K. Venkatesh. All five songs of the film became hits. Among the five songs, the songs "Nagu Nagutha Nali" and "Aagadu Endu Kai Katti Kulithare" became inspirational songs for the people. All the songs were sung by P. Susheela and P. B. Srinivas.

The film became the highest grossing Kannada film at the time of its release. Today this film is viewed as a milestone in Kannada cinema not only in Dr. Rajkumar's career. On the centenary of Indian cinema in April 2013, Forbes included Dr. Rajkumar's performance in the film on its list, "25 Greatest Acting Performances of Indian Cinema". The film was remade in Telugu in 1975 as Devudulanti Manishi, starring Krishna.

== Plot ==
Rajiva (Dr. Rajkumar) is on his way to visit his sister, Sharada, but to his astonishment, he discovers upon arrival that his brother-in-law has died. Sharada (Advani Lakshmi Devi) is the elder sister of Rajiva, and Ramachandra (Loknath) who is the elder brother of Rajiva and Sharada, is controlled by his wife Chaya (M.N.Lakshmi Devi), and listening to her words he walks away without giving a single penny, and now no one is there to take care of Sharada’s family. Rajiva decides to stay and he takes a loan from Rachutappa, the village head and send Sharada’s sons, Keshava and Chakrapani (Vajramuni and Srinath) to Bangalore for higher studies. Rajiva’s brother-in-law’s land is occupied by Honna (MP Shankar), and after a fight with Honna, Rajiva takes back his brother-in-law’s land and begins irrigation on it.

Meanwhile, Rajiva falls in love with Lakshmi (Bharathi), his neighbor's daughter. Motivated to improve their lives further, Rajiva purchased 25 acres of barren land near the village from the government. Through his efforts, he becomes a rich man who is successful and respected in the village, earning substantial profits.

However, Rajiva frequently travels to Belgaum, another city, every six months. He actually visits a woman named Sharavathi and her son, Kishore, who are living in Belgaum. Keshava marries Nagaveni (BV Radha), who is the daughter of Ramachandra. Chakrapani agrees to marry Nandini, who is a daughter of a family friend. Sridhar, a friend of Keshava and Chakrapani, whose education was also sponsored by Rajiva, marries Saraswati (Kala), who is Sharada's only daughter.

Eventually, Rajiva agrees to marry Lakshmi. Patil, a neighbor of Sharavathi, who comes to Keshava’s house to cancel his transfer, and he sees Rajiva’s photo and identifies him as Kasturi, and then he informs Keshava about Rajiva's periodic visits to Belgaum. To confirm this troubling news, Keshava travels to Belgaum and sees Rajiva's photo displayed in Sharavathi's house. When asked about Rajiva, Sharavathi replies, "Mane Yajamanradu" (the house owner). Filled with disrespect for Rajiva, Keshava confronts him and requests 50,000 Rupees to start a business. Rajiva was firm that he will give Keshava the money once he understands its value.

In a fit of anger, Keshava reveals to Lakshmi and Sharada about Sharavathi, accusing Rajiva of adultery. However, both Lakshmi and Sharada refuse to believe the accusation with Sharada telling that Rajiva was “Bangaarada Manushya” and they decide not to disclose their knowledge about Sharavathi to Rajiva. One afternoon, while taking lunch to her husband in the field, Lakshmi is chased by a bull. While Rajiva is fending off the bull, Lakshmi falls into a nearby well. Rajiva after chasing the bull dives in to save her but it is too late, and Lakshmi is already dead.

Nagaveni convinces Keshava to seek legal assistance in reclaiming what is rightfully theirs. Keshava visits Rajiva to discuss the matter, leading to a disagreement between Keshava and Sharada. During the argument, Keshava directs hurtful words at Rajiva, accusing him of stealing their property and taking advantage of their situation. He even claims that the rice in front of him is not his. Disturbed by this, Rajiva washes his hands without consuming a morsel of rice. He quietly exits the house while silently praying for the well-being of the villagers.

Chakrapani locates Sharavathi and brings her to Rajiva's house to showcase Rajiva's magnanimity to Keshava. Sharavathi reveals that she is their half-sister, an illegitimate child of Sharadha's husband. Rajiva had kept this secret and supported her throughout the years. Determined to find Rajiva, they set out on a search but are unable to locate him. Rajiva quietly walks into the sunset.

== Cast ==
- Dr. Rajkumar as Rajeeva
- Bharathi Vishnuvardhan as Lakshmi, Rajeeva's wife
- Aarathi as Sharavathi
- Advani Lakshmi Devi as Sharada, Rajeeva's elder sister
- Srinath as Chakrapani, Sharada's son
- M. P. Shankar as Honnaiah
- Vajramuni as Keshava, Sharada's son
- Balakrishna as Rachutappa
- Dwarakish as Shivalingu, Rachutappa's son
- Kala as Saraswathi, Sharada's daughter
- Loknath as Ramachandra, Rajeeva's elder brother
- M. N. Lakshmi Devi as Chaya, Ramachandra's wife
- B. V. Radha as Nagaveni, Ramachandra's daughter and Keshava's wife
- Indira Jorge
- H. R. Shastry as Lakshmi's father
- J. Shantha
- B. Hanumanthachar
- Bangalore Nagesh as Venkatswamy, a barber
- Shani Mahadevappa as Chamaiah
- Joker Shyam as Gafur
- Shringar Nagaraj as Sridhar
- Bangalore Mahadevappa
- Basavaraj (credited as Master Basavaraj)
- Ganapathi Bhat
- Susheela
- Y. R. Ashwath Narayana as a lawyer

== Production ==
The film was shot at Kalasapura and in Chikmagalur.

== Soundtrack ==
Bangaarada Manushya
- Soundtrack cover

Soundtrack album by G. K. Venkatesh
- Released: 1972
- Genre: Feature film soundtrack
- Length: 28:48
- Label: Saregama

The soundtrack of the film was composed by G. K. Venkatesh, with lyrics penned by Hunsur Krishnamurthy, Chi. Udaya Shankar, R. N. Jayagopal and Vijaya Narasimha. The two romantic songs "Aaha Mysooru Mallige" and "Baala Bangaara Neenu, Haneya Singara Neenu" have withstood the test of time. The audio was later released on Saregama.

The song "Aaha Mysooru Mallige" was later used by G. K. Venkatesh in the 1977 Telugu movie Chakradhari as "Naalo Evevo Vinthalu", which incidentally was the remake of 1974 Kannada movie Bhakta Kumbara, also starring Rajkumar, with music composition by G. K. Venkatesh.

| # | Title | Singer(s) | Lyricist | Length |
|---|---|---|---|---|
| 1 | "Nagu Naguta Nali" | P. B. Sreenivas | Hunsur Krishnamurthy | 6:03 |
| 2 | "Aagadu Endu" | P. B. Sreenivas | R. N. Jayagopal | 5:35 |
| 3 | "Aaha Mysooru Mallige" | P. Susheela, P. B. Sreenivas | Chi Udayashankar | 5:47 |
| 4 | "Baala Bangaara Neenu" | P. Susheela | Hunsur Krishnamurthy | 5:06 |
| 5 | "Hani Hani Goodidre" | P. Susheela, P. B. Sreenivas, S. P. Balasubramaniam | Vijayanarasimha | 6:12 |

== Reception ==
=== Critical response ===
Despite the overwhelming response, the film attracted strong criticism from a section of writers. Commenting on the purpose and narrative mode of the film, the late novelist Alanahalli Krishna said, "The film shows scant respect to the audience by showing a close-up of the hero's footwear in the very beginning of the film. It encourages idol worship." On the other hand, writer U. R. Ananthamurthy said the film was deceptive and would lead the young audience believe that they too will grow rich overnight like their hero Rajiva in the film. Irrespective of the flak, the film was set to redefine the course of Kannada cinema that blended both commercial and parallel cinema. Bangaarada Manushya had drawn the audience to the cinema hall in an unprecedented manner, which over the period of time made critics to praise it as an All-Time classic. Bangaarada Manushya has become an all-time favourite for many Kannada movie buffs.

=== Box office ===
The film was an hit at the box office and screened for over 104 weeks at the States Theatre (now Bhumika Theatre) in Bangalore and was screened for 60 weeks in Chamundeshwari theatre in Mysore, the film Completed one year in many centers and twenty five weeks in every major and minor center. The film collected ₹2.5 crore (equivalent to ₹123 crore or US$13 million in 2026) at the box office and was the highest grossing Kannada film at the time. After the film ran for a year just at the States theatre in Bangalore, the management of the cinema hall decided to stop screening the film to accommodate a new film. This caused public outrage and took a violent turn. However, S. Bangarappa, the then MLA, intervened and resolved the issue successfully. The film went on to complete two years. The film saw a 25 weeks run when it was re-released in 1988.

== Awards ==
The movie received following awards at 1971–72 Karnataka State Film Awards

- Second Best Film
- Best Supporting Actor — T. N. Balakrishna
- Best Screenplay — S. Siddalingaiah
- Best Cinematographer — D. V. Rajaram
- Best Editing — P. Bhakthavathsalam

The film screened at IFFI 1992 Kannada cinema Retrospect.

The film was also screened at 37th International Film Festival of India in 2006.

== Legacy ==
Bangaarada Manushya had a tremendous impact on moviegoers. Some city youth, inspired by the movie's central theme—returning to one's ancestral village—left their jobs, came back to their respective villages and took to agriculture. The film had a phenomenal box office run and was screened for two years in a row in the States film theatre on Kempe Gowda road in Bangalore. The film had a deep social impact on the audience as well and there are many stories of people in the city going to villages and becoming farmers. The film also touched on very important topics like rural development, modern agricultural practices, co-operative movement, social unity, honesty, love and dedication. In the beginning of the movie, it shows the hardship of farmers and how much they have to toil in order to make ends meet. The movie subtly says that middle-class and working-class are the backbone of the country by showing the son of a rich village head as being a spoiled brat wasting his money in the city. One of the most important messages given in the movie is that, one should not waste time and money in trying to modernize/westernize themselves through a posh lifestyle. One should be true to his identity and not try to become someone else. This theme struck a chord with the audience as Karnataka was one of the fast developing states in the country and there was a large migration from rural to urban areas.

The film was remade in Telugu in 1975 as Devudulanti Manishi, starring Krishna. On the centenary of Indian cinema in April 2013, Forbes India included the performances of Rajkumar in the film on its list, "25 Greatest Acting Performances of Indian Cinema". The 2017 film Bangara s/o Bangarada Manushya starring Dr. Rajkumar's son Shiva Rajkumar had a similar plot dealing with the problems of farmers.

The film inspired the name of a book.

=== Rajkumar: The Inimitable Actor With A Golden Voice ===
The English translation of the book Bangarada Manushya (different book, biography of Dr.Rajakumar written by A.N.Prahlada Rao) named Rajkumar: The Inimitable Actor With A Golden Voice was released in New Jersey, United States on 10 May 2008. The same book was released in London, England by Edward Thamson, Senator during the month of August 2008. The late thespian Rajkumar, who made Kannadigas proud with his brilliant acting skills and his golden voice, the book dedicated to him, in English. Rajkumar: The Inimitable Actor With A Golden Voice was released by the actor's wife Parvathamma Rajkumar in May 2008 at Bangalore also. She handed over the first copy to Professor K. S. Nissar Ahemed, the famous poet and Padmshree Awardee. The book, originally written in Kannada by A. N. Prahlada Rao, and titled Bangarada Manushya (The Golden Man), was first released in 2005 in the presence of Rajkumar himself. It ran into four editions and sold over 15,000 copies. The book has been translated into English by literary critic C. N. Ramachandran and journalist Alladi Jayashri. Published by Sapna Book House, Bangalore. To mark the completion of 75 years of Kannada film industry, the book has been released in New Jersey, America on 10 May 2008 sponsored by Brindavana, the Kannada Association of New Jersey. On this occasion, the author A. N. Prahalada Rao and his wife Mallika Prahlad have been honoured by the resident Kannadigas from New Jersey, New York, Washington DC and other surrounding cities.
