= Bhootayyana Maga Ayyu =

1974 Indian film directed by Siddalingaiah

- DVD cover
- Directed by: Siddalingaiah
- Screenplay by: Siddalingaiah
- Based on: Vayyaari by Gorur Ramaswamy Iyengar
- Produced by: N. Veeraswamy; Chandulal Jain; S. P. Varadappa; Siddalingaiah
- Starring: Vishnuvardhan; Lokesh; L. V. Sharada; M. P. Shankar; Rushyendramani; Bhavani
- Cinematography: D. V. Rajaram
- Edited by: P. Bhaktavatsalam
- Music by: G. K. Venkatesh
- Production company: Jain Combines
- Distributed by: Eswari Pictures
- Release date: 2 February 1974
- Country: India
- Language: Kannada

Bhootayyana Maga Ayyu ( transl. Bhootayya's son Ayyu) is 1974 Indian Kannada-language drama film directed by Siddalingaiah, who also wrote the screenplay based on Gorur Ramaswamy Iyengar's short story of the same name from his novel, Vayyari. The film stars Vishnuvardhan and Lokesh with M. P. Shankar, Jayamala, Rushyendramani and Balakrishna all acting in supporting roles. The film revolves around the enmity between two villagers, Ayyu and Gulla and how they mend their relationship.

Bhootayyana Maga Ayyu was a 12 page short story in a compilation of stories by Gororu Ramaswamy. Ramaswamy had initially declined to give the rights to the story but eventually agreed. Though Siddalingaiah added new plot details and characters to increase the running time of the film, it retains the core premise of the original short story. D. V. Rajaram acted as the film's cinematographer. The film was shot extensively at Kalasapura, Dharmasthala, and Talakadu. The film was edited by P. Bhaktavatsalam and the music was composed by G. K. Venkatesh, with lyrics written by Chi. Udaya Shankar and R. N. Jayagopal.

The film was released on 2 February 1974. The film ran for over 100 days in theatres, and later won the Karnataka State Film Award for First Best Film at the 7th Karnataka State Film Awards. The film also won three other Karnataka State Awards: Best Actor for Lokesh, Best Actress for Bhavani and Best Supporting Actress for Rushyendramani. The film was remade in Tamil as Ellorum Nallavare (1975), in Hindi as Ek Gaon Ki Kahani (1975) and in Telugu as Andharoo Manchivaare (1976) - with Lokesh reprising his role in all three versions.

== Plot ==
Bhootayya is a ruthless zamindar of a small village, who mercilessly occupies the land of the villagers to whom he has lent money when they fail to repay their debts. He is very shrewd and talks the villagers into building a dam across the river on the outskirts of the village, which is prone to floods. He gets hold of the fertile land on the banks of the river and builds a house for his son Ayyu. A few days later, Bhootayya falls ill and eventually dies. The villagers rejoice at his death and hold such a grudge against him that nobody turns up to perform his last rites, leaving his son Ayyu to do it all alone.

The villagers remain wary of Ayyu, and the most rebellious among them is Gulla. He is very outspoken and tries to restrain Ayyu from being mean and merciless towards the villagers, like his father. Gulla's father had previously stood surety to Bhootayya for another villager's debt and is unable to repay the money. Ayyu promptly goes with his men to confiscate Gulla's house. In an ensuing argument, Gulla smacks Ayyu. Ayyu takes it seriously and files a police complaint against Gulla, who is then arrested by the police, and this begins a prolonged enmity between the two. Gulla also hires a lawyer and ends up spending all his family's property on the court case, which he eventually loses. Unable to bear the consequences, his father commits suicide. Gulla holds Ayyu responsible for his father's death, and when he swears to kill him, his wife goes to the latter to warn him and also pleads with him to forgive her husband. However, Ayyu behaves ruthlessly towards her and swears to kill Gulla.

Ayyu's wife reminds him about his father's attitude towards the villagers and their reaction to his death. This makes Ayyu give some thought to his behaviour. Gulla's wife tries to kill herself by drowning in the river, as she becomes convinced that Ayyu will not spare her husband. Ayyu sees a woman drowning and, being a distinguished swimmer, saves her, only to find that she is his enemy's wife. This incident has a lasting effect on Ayyu, who tries to end the feud. Ayyu clears all of Gulla's debts, asking him to work for him in return. Gulla agrees and works sincerely to pay off the debts, but resents Ayyu's friendship.

During the village festival, the villagers plot to ransack Ayyu's house, and the person who leads the group is Gulla. They attack Ayyu's house at midnight and set it on fire. Ayyu, who is now a changed person, simply states that it was an accident when the district police come to investigate the case. This incident begins to change the villagers' perceptions of Ayyu. With his house burned down, Ayyu goes with his family to live in the house by the river. One day, Ayyu goes to town, leaving his family behind. The village is flooded by heavy rain, and Ayyu's house is in danger. Ayyu's wife and children try to leave the house as the dam collapses and the water enters it, flooding it completely. Gulla takes a raft and single-handedly sets out to rescue Ayyu's family. With much difficulty, he saves Ayyu's family and brings them to safety. Ayyu returns to the village and is shocked to see its plight, but is relieved to see that Gulla has rescued them. Ayyu hugs Gulla, thereby ending their years of hatred and enmity. The villagers return Ayyu's belongings and wealth that had been looted. They all celebrate the festival.

== Cast ==
- Vishnuvardhan as Gulla
- Lokesh as Sambhayya "Ayyu", son of Bhootayya
- M. P. Shankar as Bhootayya
- L. V. Sharada as Girija, Ayyu's wife
- Bhavanu as Mahadevi, Gulla's wife
- Balakrishna as Singlayya a.k.a. Bundekyatha
- Venkatarao Talageri
- Dinesh as Chikka
- Loknath as villager
- Joker Shyam as villager
- B. M. Venkatesh
- Chandulal Jain
- Dheerendra Gopal as Linga
- B. Hanumanthachar
- Narayan
- Comedian Guggu as villager
- Master Basavaraj
- Negro Babu as Byra
- Vaishali Kasaravalli as Puttamma
- Sushila Naidu
- Asha
- Jayamala
- Rushyendramani
- Sudha Belawadi (credited as Baby Sudha)

== Production ==
=== Development ===
Bhootayyana Maga Ayyu was a 12-page short story in a compilation of stories by Gorur Ramaswamy Iyengar. Film director S. Siddalingaiah saw the potential of the story and wanted to adapt it into film. He went to Iyengar's house along with producer S. P. Varadappa to buy the rights to the story. When Siddalingiah put forward the proposal of making it a film, the author declined as he believed that there was no way one can make a film out of a 12-page short story. However, after another visit to the author's house he finally gave in and sold the rights to the story to them. Siddalingiah himself converted the story into a screenplay and asked his longtime friend Hunsur Krishnamurthy to write the dialogues. Future director H. R. Bhargava was an associate director on this film.

=== Casting ===
From the beginning Siddalingah decided not to included any big stars in the cast. After his two successful films (Doorada Betta and Bangarada Manushya) people around him attributed the success of his films to matinee idol Rajkumar, the star in both the films. He wanted to prove his ability as a director without the help of star value. He signed Lokesh, a popular theatre artist by then, as Ayya and pre-superstar Vishnuvardhan, as Gulla and MP Shankar as Bhootayya. Incidentally, this is the only film in which the grandmother and granddaughter duo of Bhavani and Rushyendramani ever shared screen space in.

=== Filming ===
The film was shot extensively at Kalasapur, Dharmasthala, and Talakadu. This film was shot in Kalasapura village, near Chikmagalur town. Siddalingaiah had a particular attachment with this location. His other landmark movie Bangarada Manushya was also shot (partly) in the same village. The twenty-minute climax was an adaptation of one paragraph from the novel. The climax was shot in Kalasapura, Madhava Manthri Dam, and Shivanasamudra falls for nearly 20 days. Initially a tank was constructed to allow water into the house but it broke as soon as the camera began to roll. Siddalingaiah got it reconstructed and shot the scene again. Similarly, ropes tied to the raft gave way and started drifting in the current. Expert divers immediately jumped in and got hold of it. The scene where villagers ransack Lokesh's house and set it on fire, Shivaiah had a fire engine stationed; wet gunny clothes were kept for exigencies, besides storing water in drums. Famous actress Jayamala was one of the group artists in the film.

== Soundtrack ==
Bhootayyana Maga Ayyu

Soundtrack album by G. K. Venkatesh
- Released: 1974
- Genre: Feature film soundtrack
- Length: 13:09
- Label: Saregama

G. K. Venkatesh composed the soundtrack, and lyrics were written by Chi. Udaya Shankar, R. N. Jayagopal and Vijaya Naarasimha. The album consists of four tracks.

Tracklist
No.	Title	Lyrics	Singer(s)	Length
1.	"Virasavemba Vishake"	Chi. Udaya Shankar	G. K. Venkatesh	3:22
2.	"Sobaana Sobaana"	R. N. Jayagopal	Vani Jairam	3:24
3.	"Malenaada Henna"	Chi. Udaya Shankar	P. B. Sreenivas, S. Janaki	3:22
4.	"Maariye Gathiyendu"	Vijaya Naarasimha	G. K. Venkatesh, P. B. Sreenivas	3:01
Total length:				13:09

== Release and reception ==
The film, released on February 2, 1974, received a huge reception despite having a non-popular star cast. It went onto complete 100 days in three theatres in Bangalore alone. With a budget of 12 lakhs, it grossed over 45 lakhs at the box office. Film critics, Ashish Rajadhyaksha and Paul Willemen in their book Encyclopedia of Indian Cinema, wrote, "the film is remembered for the tremendously popular performance of Shankar as the evil Boothayya."

== Legacy ==
The film was the first Kannada colour film to be completely shot in outdoors. In 2017, Kamal Haasan included the film in his list of 70 favorite movies, stating "Though this was a commercial film, it was done on a scale that only big Hollywood directors would think of. So much hard work went into the film." Malenada Henna Mai Banna is one of the evergreen songs in the history of Kannada films. The film also was the inspiration behind the title of the 2018 Kannada-language film named, Bhootayyana Mommaga Ayyu.
