= Gorur Ramaswamy Iyengar =

Indian writer (1904-1991)

Goruru Ramaswamy Iyengar
- Goruru Ramaswamy Iyengar
- Born: Goruru Ramaswamy Iyengar; 4 July 1904; Gorur, Mysore State (Now Karnataka), India
- Died: 28 September 1991; Bangalore, India
- Occupation: Writer
- Children: 5
- Writing career
- Pen name: Goruru Ramaswamy Iyengar
- Notable works: Namma Oorina Rasikaru,Bhootayyana Maga Ayyu, Amerikadalli Goruru

Goruru Ramaswamy Iyengar (1904–1991), popularly known as Goruraru, was an Indian writer who wrote in Kannada. He was well known for his humour and satire.

== Early life ==
Goruru Ramaswami Iyengar was born at "Goruru" in Hassan district of Karnataka on 4 July 1904 to a Tamil Hindu family. His father was Srinivas and his mother Lakshamma.

== Career ==
Goruru Ramaswami Iyengar was influenced by Indian Independence Movement and became a staunch follower of Mahatma Gandhi. He was jailed by the British administration in 1942 for 2 months for his participation in the Quit India Movement. His son Ramachandra became a martyr for the same cause in 1947.

After Independence in 1947, Goruru worked in the industries. He began writing early in life with the celebrated books Halliya Chitragalu (1930) and Namma Oorina Rasikaru (1932). His "Amerikadalli Goruru" 1979, is a satirical travelogue of a true Indian in United States. It fetched him the Sahitya Akademi Award in 1981. His short story "Bhootayyana Maga Ayyu" (based on true events) was made into a Kannada movie of the same name by noted director S. Siddalingaiah in 1975 with leading actors as Vishnuvardhan (actor) & Lokesh. Novels Hemavathi and Urvashi were also made into movies. His travelogue was made into a television series. His other works include Rasaphala, Namma Oorina Rasikaru, Putta mallige, Hemavathi and Garudagambada Dasayya, Meravanige. His Rajanartaki was a translation of the Gujarathi novel Amrapali by Ramachandra Thakore. He was nominated to Karnataka Legislative Council in 1952 in recognition of his literary contributions. In 1971 he was a recipient of an Honorary doctorate from the University of Mysore.

A road in Rajajinagar, Bangalore is named after him.

== Death ==
Goruru Ramaswamy Iyengar died 28 September 1991 at the age of 87. His birth centenary was celebrated in 2005. His memoirs of his childhood days, Goruru Avara Balyada Atma Kathe was published posthumously.
