= Raman Thediya Seethai =

Raman Thediya Seethai (transl. The Seethai that Raman sought) may refer to:

- Raman Thediya Seethai (1972 film)
- Raman Thediya Seethai (2008 film)
