= Ninne Pelladata =

Ninne Pelladata (lit. 'Marry you' in Telugu) may refer to:

- Ninne Pelladata (1968 film), 1968 Indian comedy drama film
- Ninne Pelladata (1996 film), 1996 Indian drama film
