= Nanda Gokula =

- Directed by: Y. R. Swamy
- Screenplay by: Y. R. Swamy; Chi. Udaya Shankar
- Story by: Chi. Udaya Shankar
- Produced by: Shyamprasad Enterprises
- Starring: Dr. Rajkumar; Jayanthi; Ramesh; K. S. Ashwath
- Cinematography: R. Chittibabu
- Edited by: P. Bhaktavatsalam
- Music by: Vijaya Bhaskar
- Production company: Shyamprasad Enterprises
- Release date: 1972
- Running time: 147 minutes
- Country: India
- Language: Kannada

Nanda Gokula is a 1972 Indian Kannada-language drama film directed by Y. R. Swamy and produced by Shyamprasad Enterprises. It starred Dr. Rajkumar, Ramesh, and Jayanthi. Vijaya Bhaskar scored the music and Swamy wrote the screenplay based on a story by Chi. Udaya Shankar.

== Plot ==
Sridar abandons his family and marries Mohini, the daughter of a rich business tycoon. Sridar's father meets an accident, and wishes to reunite with his son before dying.

== Cast ==
- Dr. Rajkumar as Aanand
- Jayanthi as Jaya
- Ramesh as Sridhar
- B. V. Radha as Mohini
- T. N. Balakrishna as Gudibande Ganesha Raua
- M. N. Lakshmi Devi as Dhanalakshmi
- K. S. Ashwath as Seetharamayya
- Advani Lakshmi Devi as Savithri
- Sampath as Veerabhadrayya
- M. Jayashree as Subhadra
- Kala as Shanthi
- Dwarakish as Sundara
- Vijayasree AS Lilly
- Dinesh as Madan Mohan
- Shakti Prasad as Shivashankar
- Srinath in a guest appearance

== Soundtrack ==
The music of the film was composed by Vijaya Bhaskar.

=== Track list ===
#	Title	Singer(s)	Lyrics
1	"Nanjana Goodinda"	P. B. Sreenivas, S. P. Balasubrahmanyam	Chi Udayashankar
2	"Nee Janisida Dinavu"	P. B. Sreenivas	Chi. Udaya Shankar
3	"Ee Dina Januma Dina"	P. B. Sreenivas	Chi. Udaya Shankar
4	"Manada Maathige"	P. Susheela	Vijaya Narasimha

== See also ==
- Kannada films of 1972
