= Anna Attige =

1974 film

Anna Atthige
- Lobby card
- Directed by: M. R. Vittal
- Written by: Sorat Ashwath (dialogues)
- Screenplay by: Sorat Ashwath; M. R. Vittal
- Story by: H. T. Mahanthesha Shastry
- Produced by: M. R. Srinivas
- Starring: K. S. Ashwath; Pandari Bai; Vishnuvardhan; Bharathi
- Cinematography: T. G. Shekar
- Edited by: P. G. Mohan
- Music by: G. K. Venkatesh
- Production company: M R Sri Productions
- Distributed by: M R Sri Productions
- Release date: 18 November 1974
- Running time: 141 minutes
- Country: India
- Language: Kannada

Anna Atthige ( transl. Brother & Sister-in-Law) is a 1974 Indian Kannada-language film, directed by M. R. Vittal and produced by M. R. Srinivas. The film stars K. S. Ashwath, Pandari Bai, Vishnuvardhan and Bharathi. The films musical score was composed by G. K. Venkatesh.

== Cast ==
- K. S. Ashwath as Siddappa
- Pandari Bai as Annapoorna
- Vishnuvardhan as Ravi
- Bharathi Vishnuvardhan as Hema
- Ramgopal as Shailendra
- B. V. Radha as Shobha
- Balakrishna as Chandru
- M. N. Lakshmi Devi as Lakshmi
- Dwarakish as Shyam
- Tiger Prabhakar as a thief
- Prameela
- Shani Mahadevappa
- Rajashree as Mamatha, Siddappa's daughter (credited as Baby Rajashree)
- Sampath as Hema's father (cameo)

== Soundtrack ==
The music was composed by G. K. Venkatesh.

| No. | Song | Singers | Lyrics | Length |
|---|---|---|---|---|
| 1 | "Olavemba Ondu Hoodotadalli" | K. J. Yesudas, Vani Jayaram | R. N. Jayagopal | 04:46 |
| 2 | "Baalondu Ramya Gana" | P. B. Srinivas | Ku Ra Seetharama Sastry | 05:03 |
| 3 | "Naadigare Kannada Naadigare" | G. K. Venkatesh | Sorat Ashwath | 04:56 |
