= Sipayi Chinnayya =

- Theatrical release poster
- Directed by: G. V. R. Seshagiri Rao
- Written by: Bhamidipati Radha Krishna (dialogues)
- Screenplay by: G. V. R. Seshagiri Rao
- Story by: Turaiyur K. Murthy
- Produced by: D. Ramanaidu
- Starring: Akkineni Nageswara Rao; K. R. Vijaya; Bharathi
- Cinematography: P. Bhaskara Rao
- Edited by: K. A. Marthand
- Music by: M. S. Viswanathan
- Production company: Suresh Productions
- Distributed by: Navayuga Films
- Release date: 30 October 1969
- Running time: 153 mins
- Country: India
- Language: Telugu

Sipayi Chinnayya is a 1969 Telugu-language drama film produced by D. Ramanaidu under the Suresh Productions banner and directed by G. V. R. Seshagiri Rao. It stars Akkineni Nageswara Rao, K. R. Vijaya, Bharathi with music composed by M. S. Viswanathan.

== Plot ==
The film begins with the Zamindary family. Its heir, Captain Bhaskar, joins the Indian Navy along with his identical Sipayi Chinnayya, a pleb who belongs to the same village and are besties, too. After returning, Bhaskar's younger brother Shekar and mother Subhadramma warmly welcomed him. Here, everyone's hearts are delightful except Zamindar's stepbrother, Kodandam, who is vicious towards Bhaskar for the property. Eventually, Bhaskar loves his cousin Shobha, and the elders fix their alliance. Chinnaiah leads a happy family life with his wife, Kannamma, and all the villagers credit him for his amiable nature except a goon, Ganganna, the henchman of Kodandam. Ahead, though Bhaskar is a good-humane, Shekar is furious & wild and thinks penniless as baseness also suffers insolvents by making them impoverished. Aware of it, Chinnaiah abuses Shekar when angered Bhaskar slaps him. Later, he repents and reaches the village along with Manager Chokka Rao to apologize when Bhaskar presents Chinnaiah with some sweets in which he secretly places some amount to clear the debts of villagers. After that, Bhaskar wants to ride into the sea when Chinnaiah says he will return soon. Then, Ganganna seeks to slay Bhaskar based on Kondandam's instructions; he backstabs him and takes him to the middle of the sea. Spotting it, Chinnaiah chases them, but unfortunately, they are stuck in the whirlpool.

Knowing the tragic event, Subhadramma gets a heart attack, and Kondandam ploys to grab the property. Simultaneously, Shekar files a case against Chinnaiah for slaughtering Bhaskar by showing the amount in the sweet box as evidence. Fortuitously, Chinnaiah floats to the shore and expresses his sorrow to Chokka Rao when Shekar understands the virtue of Chinnaiah and requests him to take Bhaskar's position to safeguard their mother & property. Due to loyalty, he accepts and withstands many turbulences and even stands strong when villagers convert his wife to a widow. Later, he secretly reveals the facts to Kannamma and takes her to the palace, which is witnessed by Ganganna, who attributes the illicit relationship between them. Here, entire villagers denounce Kannamma, and Chinnaiah stays in a dilemma and cannot reveal the truth; Subhadramma & Shobha also scold him when he silently divulges it to Shobha. The village head, Peddaia, forcibly makes remarriage arrangements for Kannamma with Ganganna. In that critical situation, like a godsend, Bhaskar is alive and is rescued by fishers; due to his tough time, he goes into the clutches of Kondandam when Shobha frees him, and they rush to the estate. During the wedding, Shekar & Chinnaiah reach the venue when a clash arises, leading to severe destruction, which calms down with Bhaskar's arrival. At last, Bhaskar & Chinnaiah see the end of the baddies. Finally, the movie ends on a happy note with the marriage of Bhaskar & Shobha.

== Cast ==
- Akkineni Nageswara Rao as Captain Bhaskar & Sipayi Chinnayya (Dual role)
- K. R. Vijaya as Kannamma
- Bharathi as Shobha
- Jaggayya as Sekhar
- Satyanarayana as Ganganna
- Nagabhushanam as Chokka Rao
- Prabhakar Reddy as Kodandam
- Mikkilineni as Peddaiah
- Raja Babu as Amavasya
- Raavi Kondala Rao as Kailasam
- S. V. Ramadas as Inspector
- D. Ramanaidu as Doctor (cameo)
- Pandari Bai as Subhadramma
- Rushyendramani as Chinnaiah's Bamma
- L. Vijayalakshmi as item number
- Vijaya Lalitha as item number

== Crew ==
- Art: Rajendra Kumar
- Choreography: Chinni-Sampath, K. S. Reddy
- Fights: Raghavulu
- Lyrics: Arudra, Aatreya, Devulapalli, Dasarathi
- Playback: Ghantasala, P. Susheela, L. R. Eeswari
- Story: Turaiyur K. Murthy
- Dialogues: Bhamidipati Radha Krishna
- Music: M. S. Viswanathan
- Cinematography: P. Bhaskara Rao
- Editing: K. A. Marthand
- Producer: D. Ramanaidu
- Director: GVR Seshagiri Rao
- Banner: Suresh Productions
- Release Date: 30 October 1969

== Soundtrack ==
Sipayi Chinnayya

Film score by M. S. Viswanathan
- Released: 1969
- Genre: Soundtrack
- Length: 25:26
- Label: AVM Audio
- Producer: M. S. Viswanathan

Music composed by M. S. Viswanathan. The song Naa Janma Bhoomi is a blockbuster. Music released AVM Audio Company.

No.	Title	Lyrics	Singer(s)	Length
1.	"Naa Janma Bhoomi"	Aarudhra	Ghantasala	4:28
2.	"Aa Naava Datipoyindhi"	Devulapalli	Ghantasala, P. Susheela	3:00
3.	"Ammayi Muddu Tappa"	Aarudhra	Ghantasala, P. Susheela	3:07
4.	"Naa Raaju Navvulu"	Aarudhra	P. Susheela	3:54
5.	"Padava Vachinde"	Acharya Aatreya	Ghantasala, P. Susheela	3:10
6.	"Thajaga Vundhi"	Dasarathi	P. Susheela	4:02
7.	"Ore Mava Yesukora"	Aarudhra	L. R. Eswari	3:45
