= Dudde Doddappa =

1966 film by B. R. Panthulu

- Directed by: B. R. Panthulu
- Written by: Maa Raa
- Produced by: B. R. Panthulu
- Starring: B. R. Panthulu; M. V. Rajamma; Ramesh; Narasimharaju
- Cinematography: V. Ramamurthy
- Edited by: R. Devarajan
- Music by: T. G. Lingappa
- Production company: Padmini Pictures
- Release date: 9 February 1966
- Running time: 156 minutes
- Country: India
- Language: Kannada

Dudde Doddappa ( transl. Money Rules) is a 1966 Indian Kannada-language film, directed and produced by B. R. Panthulu. The film stars B. R. Panthulu, M. V. Rajamma, Ramesh and Narasimharaju. It was remade in Tamil as Namma Veettu Lakshmi (1966) and in Telugu as Lakshmi Nivasam (1968).

== Cast ==
- B. R. Panthulu as Somayya
- M. V. Rajamma as Sharada
- Narasimharaju as Raja
- Bharathi Vishnuvardhan as Kalpana
- Giriyan
- Gururaj
- Ganapathi Bhat as Gangadhar
- B. Hanumanthachar
- Krishna Shastry
- Nagappa
- Bhavanishankar
- Dasharatha
- Honnappa
- Shivaramaiah
- L. N. Swamy
- Shivaram
- Gurusiddappa
- Sharada
- Papamma
- Shanthamma
- Padmavathamma
- Vijayakumari
- Suguna
- Suryakumari
- Vijayabharathi
- Kumari Yashoda
- Krishnakumar
- V. R. Lakshmi

== Soundtrack ==
The music was composed by T. G. Lingappa.

| No. | Song | Singers | Lyrics | Length (m:ss) |
|---|---|---|---|---|
| 1 | "Bhakthi Beku" | P. B. Sreenivas | Madhavachar | 01:55 |
| 2 | "Hagalinalu Irulu" | Renuka | R. N. Jayagopal | 02:49 |
| 3 | "Hanave Ninnaya Guna" | M. Balamurali Krishna | Sri Vadiraja | 03:29 |
| 4 | "Mathade Eko Nalla" | Bangalore Latha | R. N. Jayagopal | 02:41 |
| 5 | "Mathi Beku" | S. Janaki | Vijaya Narasimha | 02:28 |
| 6 | "Neenu Nanu" | P. B. Sreenivas, Renuka | Vijaya Narasimha | 03:27 |
| 7 | "Nodu kannara" | Renuka, Bangalore Latha | Vijaya Narasimha | 06:27 |
| 8 | "Yoeanada Hosa Hadu" | S. Janaki, T. A. Mothi | R. N. Jayagopal | 03:10 |
