= Prathima =

- Directed by: Sudhin Menon
- Produced by: Sudhin Menon
- Starring: Vishnuvardhan; Bharathi; Mamatha Shenoy; Ambareesh
- Music by: Khanu Ghosh
- Release date: 1978
- Country: India
- Language: Kannada

Prathima is a 1978 Indian Kannada film, directed and produced by Sudhir Menon. The film stars Vishnuvardhan, Bharathi, Mamatha Shenoy and Ambareesh in the lead roles. The film has musical score by Khanu Ghosh.

== Cast ==
- Vishnuvardhan
- Bharathi
- Mamatha Shenoy
- Ambareesh
