= Bhakta Kumbara =

1974 Indian Kannada film

- Directed by: Hunsur Krishnamurthy
- Screenplay by: Hunsur Krishnamurthy
- Produced by: N. R. Anuradha Devi
- Starring: Rajkumar; Leelavathi; Balakrishna; Vajramuni; Dwarakish; Thoogudeepa Srinivas; Manjula; Sridevi
- Cinematography: M. A. Rehman
- Edited by: Kotagiri Gopala Rao; Kotagiri Venkateswara Rao
- Music by: G. K. Venkatesh
- Production company: Lakshmi Film Combines
- Distributed by: Venus Movies
- Release date: 1974
- Running time: 150 minutes
- Country: India
- Language: Kannada

Bhakta Kumbara ( transl. Devotee Kumbara) is a 1974 Indian Kannada-language biographical film directed by Hunsur Krishnamurthy. The film stars Rajkumar and Leelavathi. Actress Sridevi essayed the role of Muktha Bai (as a child artist), thereby the latter making her Kannada film debut. The film was produced by N. R. Anuradha Devi under Lakshmi Film Combines. Bhakta Kumbara marked the eighth collaboration between Dr. Rajkumar and director Hunsur Krishnamurthy.

The movie is based on the life of Gora Kumbhar, a potter turned into a saint who lived in the 13th and 14th centuries in Teredoki village. He supposedly lost his child while curing the clay by his legs for making pots, because he did not notice his child fumbling under his feet as he immersed himself in chanting the name of God. He was called Saint Gora Kumbara by the people of Maharashtra.

The film won three awards at the 1974-75 Karnataka State Film Awards - Third Best Film, Best Actor (Rajkumar) for his portrayal of the potter-turned-saint Gora Kumbhar and Best Music Director (G. K. Venkatesh). The movie saw a theatrical run of 175 days and was declared a Blockbuster at the box office. Bhakta Kumbara is the second Kannada film based on the life of Gora Kumbhar with the first being Gora Kumbara(1960). The movie was dubbed in Hindi as Bhakti Main Bhagwan. The movie was remade in Telugu in 1977 by V. Madhusudhana Rao as Chakradhari starring Akkineni Nageswara Rao. G. K. Venkatesh was the music director of the Telugu version as well and he retained four songs from the Kannada version.

== Cast ==
- Rajkumar as Gora
- Leelavathi as Gora's wife
- Manjula as Manju, Lakshmi's sister
- Sampath as Lakshmi and Manju's father
- Rajashankar as Santha Namadev
- Ramesh as Lord Panduranga/Gora's caretaker
- T. N. Balakrishna as Sangya, Gora's Neighbor
- M. N. Lakshmi Devi Thulasi, Sangya's wife
- Vajramuni as Krishna, Gora's relative
- Dwarakish as Gopi
- Thoogudeepa Srinivas as Patela
- Kanchana in the song Kande Hariya Kande
- Shani Mahadevappa as Santha Jnanadeva
- H. R. Shastry
- Joker Shyam
- Sridevi as Muktha Bai, St. Jnanadeva's sister

== Soundtrack ==
The music of the film was composed by G. K. Venkatesh with lyrics penned by Hunsur Krishnamurthy and Chi. Udaya Shankar.

Bhakta Kumbara

Soundtrack album by G. K. Venkatesh
- Released: 1974 (Initial release of the Tracks); 19 September 2006 (Release of the Soundtrack Album)
- Recorded: 1974
- Genre: Feature film Soundtrack
- Length: 28:50
- Language: Kannada
- Labels: Universal Music; Fontana International

G. K. Venkatesh chronology
Sampathige Saval (1974)	Bhakta Kumbara (1974)	Anna Attige (1974)

4 songs from this movie were retained in its Telugu remake Chakradhari which also had music composition by G. K. Venkatesh.

1. Manava Dehavu Moole Mamsada Thadike was retained as Mavava Amunnadi Deham
2. Vitala Vitala Panduranga Vitala was retained as Vitala Panduranga Vitala
3. Hari Namave Chanda was retained as Harinamame Madhuram
4. Kande Hariya Kande was retained as Kanugontini Harini

=== Track list ===
#	Title	Singer(s)
1	"Naanu Neenu Nentarayya"	P. B. Sreenivas
2	"Vitala Vitala Panduranga Vitala"	S.P. Balasubramaniam
3	"Manava Dehavu Moole Mamsada Thadike"	P. B. Sreenivas
4	"Hari Namave Chanda"	P. B. Sreenivas
5	"Jodi Bedo Kalavamma"	S. Janaki
6	"Kande Hariya Kande"	P. B. Sreenivas
7	"Guru Bramham"	G. K. Venkatesh
8	"Vitala Panduranga"	P. B. Sreenivas
9	"Lakshmi Sthothram"	P. B. Sreenivas
10	"Elli Mareyade"	P.B. Sreenivas
