= Doorada Betta =

1973 Indian film directed by Siddalingaiah

- Film poster
- Directed by: Siddalingaiah
- Produced by: Vikram Srinivas
- Starring: Rajkumar; Bharathi Vishnuvardhan; Balakrishna
- Cinematography: D. V. Rajaram
- Edited by: N. C. Rajan
- Music by: G. K. Venkatesh
- Production company: KCN Movies
- Release date: 1973
- Running time: 169 minutes
- Country: India
- Language: Kannada

Doorada Betta ( transl. Faraway mountain) is a 1973 Kannada-language film directed by Siddalingaiah. The film starred Rajkumar and Bharathi Vishnuvardhan in lead roles with Balakrishna, K. S. Ashwath, Leelavathi and Sampath playing supporting roles. The film, along with Mooruvare Vajragalu was Rajkumar's last movie in black-and-white (though this movie did have a few sequences in colour). This movie was the last venture featuring the celebrated team — Rajkumar, Siddalingaiah and Bharathi. The core plot of the movie is loosely based on the National Award winning 1965 Marathi movie Sadhi Mansa.

This was the last film where Rajkumar and Bharathi were seen together. It was also Rajkumar's last collaboration with Siddalingaiah. This is also the only Kannada movie where popular singer Asha Bhonsle has lent her voice for a song and dance number. The movie saw a modest theatrical run.

== Cast ==
- Rajkumar as Shiva
- Bharathi Vishnuvardhan as Gowri
- K. S. Ashwath
- Leelavathi
- Balakrishna
- Sampath
- M. P. Shankar
- Dwarakish
- Chi. Udayashankar
- Loknath
- Shani Mahadevappa
- Bangalore Nagesh
- Joker Shyam
- H. R. Shastry
- Sathyan
- Kannada Raju
- Comedian Guggu
- Y. R. Ashwath Narayan
- Chaluvali Narayan
- Papamma as Bhadrakali
- Ramadevi
- Jorge Indira
- Master Basavaraj
- Usha Chauhan

== Soundtrack ==
Music for the film and its soundtrack was composed by G. K. Venkatesh, with lyrics for the soundtrack written by Chi. Udaya Shankar. The soundtrack album includes tracks from P. Susheela, P. B. Sreenivas, A. Mothi and Asha Bhosle. G. K. Venkatesh reused the tune of the song "Preetine Aa Dyavaru Thanda" from this movie for his 1980 Telugu movie Navvuthu Brathakali as "Aasa to Jeevinchadamlo".

Track listing
No.	Title	Music	Singer(s)	Length
1.	"Kaamanna Kattige"	G. K. Venkatesh	P. B. Sreenivas, A. Mothi	3:53
2.	"Preetine Aa Dyavaru Thanda"	G. K. Venkatesh	P. Susheela, P. B. Sreenivas	4:15
3.	"Savaalu haaki Solisi ellara"	G. K. Venkatesh; lyrics: Hunsur Krishnamurthy	Asha Bhosle, P. B. Sreenivas, Mothi	-
