= Bhoolokadalli Yamaraja =

- Directed by: Siddalingaiah
- Written by: N. S. Rao (dialogues)
- Screenplay by: M. D. Sundar
- Story by: Basumani
- Produced by: N. Veeraswamy; S. P. Varadaraj; Siddalingaiah; J. Chandulal Jain
- Starring: Lokesh; M. P. Shankar; Jai Jagadish; Mohan
- Cinematography: V. K. Kannan
- Edited by: P. Bhakthavathsalam
- Music by: C. Ashwath
- Production company: Jain Combines
- Distributed by: Jain Combines
- Release date: 7 June 1979
- Running time: 128 minutes
- Country: India
- Language: Kannada

Bhoolokadalli Yamaraja a 1979 Indian Kannada-language film, directed by Siddalingaiah and produced by N. Veeraswamy, S. P. Varadaraj, Siddalingaiah and J. Chandulal Jain. The film stars Lokesh, M. P. Shankar, Jai Jagadish and Mohan. The film has musical score by C. Ashwath.

== Cast ==
- Lokesh
- M. P. Shankar
- Jai Jagadish
- Mohan
- Uday Jadugar
- Anjali
- Vijayalalitha
- Vani
- Chandrika
- Shanthala
- T. N. Balakrishna in Guest Appearance
- C. H. Loknath in Guest Appearance
- N. S. Rao in Guest Appearance

== Soundtrack ==
The music was composed by C. Ashwath.

No.	Song	Singers	Lyrics	Length (m:ss)
1	"Endu Kaanada Belaka Kande"	S. P. Balasubrahmanyam, Vani Jairam	Dodda Range Gowda	04:20
2	"Ninna Myaage"	S. P. Balasubrahmanyam, S. Janaki, Vani Jairam	Dodda Range Gowda	03:45
3	"Ye Mudyaa"	S. Janaki	Bhangi Ranga	04:17
4	"Youvvana Mojina Aananda"	S. P. Balasubrahmanyam, S. Janaki	Dodda Range Gowda	05:38
