= Gora Kumbhar =

13th century saint from Maharashtra, India

Sant Gora Kumbhar

Personal life
- Born: c. 1267
- Died: c. 1317

Religious life
- Religion: Hinduism
- Philosophy: Bhakti movement
- Sect: Varkari

Sant Gora Kumbhar (also known as Goroba) was a Hindu sant associated with the Bhakti movement and the Varkari sect of Maharashtra, India. He was a potter by trade and devotee of Vithal. Gora Kumbhar, along with other saints, wrote and sung hundreds of Abhangs.

Gora Kumbhar is traditionally believed to have lived in the village of Satyapuri, presently known as Goraba Ter in Dharashiv district of Maharashtra State. He is believed to have been a contemporary of Namdev. He is thought to have lived between c. 1267 and c. 1317 CE. A small temple named after him was built in the village and is visited by devotees.

== In popular culture ==
Several motion pictures have been produced in India, about the life and bhakthi of Gora Kumbhar:

- K. S. Gopalakrishnan (Note: Not K. S. Gopalakrishnan) directed the Telugu movie entitled Chakradhari in 1948. It starred V. Nagayya and S. Varalakshmi.
- K. S. Gopalakrishnan directed the Tamil movie entitled Chakradhari in 1948. It starred V. Nagayya and Pushpavalli.
- 1974 Kannada film Bhakta Kumbara starring Dr. Rajkumar, became a blockbuster.
- V. Madhusudhana Rao directed another Telugu movie entitled Chakradhari in 1977. It starred Akkineni Nageswara Rao and was a remake of 1974 Kannada film Bhakta Kumbara.
- Dinesh Raval directed Gujarati film Bhagat Gora Kumbhar in 1978, starring Arvind Trivedi, Sarla Yevlekar, Kalpana Diwan, Shrikant Soni, Mahesh Joshi and others.
