= Nadodi =

1966 film by B. R. Panthulu

- Theatrical release poster
- Directed by: B. R. Panthulu
- Story by: G. Balasubramaniam
- Produced by: B. R. Panthulu
- Starring: M. G. Ramachandran; B. Saroja Devi; Bharathi
- Cinematography: V. Ramamoorthy
- Edited by: R. Deva
- Music by: M. S. Viswanathan
- Production company: Padmini Pictures
- Release date: 14 April 1966
- Running time: 155 minutes
- Country: India
- Language: Tamil

Nadodi (pronounced [n̪aːɖoːɖi]; transl. Vagabond) is a 1966 Indian Tamil-language film, produced and directed by B. R. Panthulu. The film stars M. G. Ramachandran (credited as M. G. R), B. Saroja Devi and Bharathi in her acting debut. It was released on 14 April 1966, and became a modest commercial success.

== Plot ==
Thyagu has been inconsolable since Meena, his lover, committed suicide after her father, the wealthy Dharmalingam, categorically refused Meena's marriage to her beloved Thyagu, on the pretext that Thyagu belongs to a lower caste. Dharmalingam is a hypocrite, being an activist speaker who travels the country and preaches to anyone who would listen the virtues of the abolition of the caste system.

To trap him, confront his hypocrisy and to honour her older sister, Radha, the second daughter of Dharmalingam leaves upon meeting the mysterious benefactor that seems to be Thyagu, and decides to marry him. Indeed, this good model son, adoptive, gave up his immense heritage, preferring to bequeath integration to the blue-collar workers of his late father. Thyagu ends up leaving the family field and is put in search of plenitude, by making of course its passage.

Radha meanwhile, falls into the claws of Jambu, a former gardener, who holds her because of the misfortunes caused by her father, particularly the death of his mother and her little sister. In reprisals, by reminding the contemptible words uttered by Dharmalingam against his blind little sister, Jambu decides to return the similar one. He deprives Radha of her sight and puts her at the street corner to beg. Later, the ways of Radha and Thyagu cross. Alas, neither one, nor the other can be recognised, be identified about it.

== Cast ==
Male cast

- M. G. R as Thyagu
- M. N. Nambiar as Jambu
- Nagesh as 'Valippu' Manickam
- V. K. Ramasamy as Dharmalingam
- K. R. Ramasamy as Nagendran
- V. Gopalakrishnan as Thyagu (Imposter)
- P. S. Venkatachalam as Arumugam Mudaliar
- S. M. Thirupathisami as Grandfather
- Gundu Mani as Pikshandhi

Female cast

- B. Saroja Devi as Radha
- Bharathi as Meena
- P. K. Saraswathi as Lakshmi
- Baby Shakeela as Rajee
- Jayakumari as Jambu's blind sister

Supporting cast

- Loose Arumugam, Raja, S. A. G. Sami, Kumar, Kamakshinathan, Kesavan, Sami, Dhandapani, P. S. Selvaraj.

== Production ==
Nadodi was produced and directed by B. R. Panthulu under Padmini Pictures. The dialogues were written by R. K. Shanmugam from a story by G. Balasubramaniam. V. Ramamoorthy handled the cinematography, and R. Devarajan did so for editing. Bharathi made her acting debut in this film.

== Soundtrack ==
The soundtrack was composed by M. S. Viswanathan. "Ulagamengum" is based on "Tom Dooley" by The Kingston Trio.

Track listing
No.	Title	Lyrics	Singer(s)	Length
1.	"Ulagamengum Orey"	Kannadasan	T. M. Soundararajan, P. Susheela	3.24
2.	"Kadavul Seitha Paavam"	Kannadasan	T. M. Soundararajan	4.43
3.	"Androru Naal"	Kannadasan	L. R. Eswari, P. Susheela
4.	"Naadu Athai Naadu"	Kannadasan	T. M. Soundararajan, P. Susheela
5.	"Paadum KuralInge Padiyavan Enge"	Kannadasan	P. Susheela
6.	"Rassikathane Intha"	Kannadasan	P. Susheela
7.	"Thirumbivaa"	Vaali	T. M. Soundararajan, P. Susheela
8.	"Kadavul Thandha Paadam"	Kannadasan	T. M. Soundararajan
9.	"Kangalinal"	Vaali	T. M. Soundararajan, P. Susheela

== Release and reception ==
Nadodi was released on 14 April 1966. Ananda Vikatan negatively reviewed the film, calling it worth watching only for the songs. Kalki, however, reviewed the film more positively. The film was a modest success, with a theatrical run of 70 days.
