= Hasiru Thorana =

- Directed by: T. V. Singh Thakur
- Screenplay by: T. V. Singh Thakur
- Story by: Sundaramma Dialogues : R N Jayagopal
- Produced by: Y. Anantharama Rao
- Starring: Rajkumar; Bharathi Vishnuvardhan; Udaykumar
- Cinematography: Srikanth; Rajaram; Kumar
- Edited by: P. N. Rao
- Music by: Upendra Kumar
- Distributed by: Indira Movies
- Release date: 1970
- Running time: 142 minutes
- Country: India
- Language: Kannada

Hasiru Thorana ( transl. The leaf bunting) is a 1970 Indian Kannada language drama film directed by T. V. Singh Thakur and written by Sundaramma. It stars Rajkumar, Udaykumar and Bharathi Vishnuvardhan. The film was released under the Sri Indira Movies banner and produced by Y. Anantharama Rao. Upendra Kumar composed the music.

== Cast ==
- Rajkumar as Madhu
- Udaykumar as Soori
- Bharathi Vishnuvardhan as Meena
- Narasimharaju as Apatbandhava
- Pandari Bai as Savitri
- Ganapathi Bhat
- B. Raghavendra Rao
- M. Jayashree as Jayashree
- H. R. Shastry

== Soundtrack ==
The music was composed by Upendra Kumar with lyrics for the soundtrack written by R. N. Jayagopal and G. V. Iyer.

=== Track list ===
#	Title	Singer(s)
1	"Ondu Dina Ellindalo"	P. B. Sreenivas, S. Janaki
2	"Nodu Nodu Mellage"	P. B. Sreenivas
3	"Onde Thayi Makkalu"	S. Janaki
4	"Ee Meenantha Hennu"	L. R. Eswari
5	"Seethe Hrudaya Sakhi"	P. B. Sreenivas
6	"Nee Yaaro Eno Sakha"	S. Janaki

== See also ==
- Kannada films of 1970
