= Bala Panjara =

1970 film

- Directed by: M. R. Vittal
- Written by: Tha Ra Su (dialogues)
- Screenplay by: M. R. Vittal
- Story by: G. D. Maddulkar (Based on Novel)
- Produced by: Indian National Pictures (P) Ltd
- Starring: Pandari Bai; Shailashree; K. S. Ashwath; Ranga
- Cinematography: Kumar
- Edited by: R. E. Chinnappa
- Music by: Vijaya Bhaskar
- Production company: Indian National Pictures (P) Ltd
- Distributed by: Indian National Pictures (P) Ltd
- Release date: 12 November 1970
- Running time: 134 min
- Country: India
- Language: Kannada

Bala Panjara is a 1972 Indian Kannada film, directed by M. R. Vittal and produced by Indian National Pictures (P) Ltd. The film stars Pandari Bai, Shailashree, K. S. Ashwath and Ranga in the lead roles. The film has musical score by Vijaya Bhaskar.

== Cast ==
- Pandari Bai as Parvati
- Shailashree as Champa
- K. S. Ashwath as Devanna
- Ranga as Shankar
- Narasimharaju
- R. T. Rama as Radha
- Jejamma
- Malashree
- Indrani
- Kumari Savithri
- Sampath as Ramanna
- Chethan
- Thoogudeepa Srinivas as Raghu
- Somashekhar
- Narayan
- Master Ganesh
- Master Ravishankar
- Master Nagaraj
- Master Kanti
- Master Ravi
