= Prema Prema Prema =

- Official poster
- Directed by: S. Siddalingaiah
- Screenplay by: S. Siddalingaiah
- Based on: Talemaaru by Bilumane Ramadas
- Produced by: S. Siddalingaiah
- Starring: Suresh Raj; Sindhu Menon; Ramya
- Cinematography: Mallikarjuna
- Edited by: Shyam Yadav
- Music by: Rajan–Nagendra
- Release date: 22 March 1999
- Country: India
- Language: Kannada

Prema Prema Prema (transl. Love, love, love) is a 1999 Indian Kannada-language romantic drama film directed by S. Siddalingaiah and starring Suresh Raj, Sindhu Menon and Ramya. The film is based on the novel Talemaaru by Ramdas. After this film, Siddalingaiah took a break from direction and it became his final film as director.

== Cast ==
- Suresh Raj as Ramanna and Singappa
- Sindhu Menon as Savithri
- Ramya as Kadamma
- Sanketh Kashi
- Dheerendra Gopal
- Sharan
- Arvind
- Anilkumar
- Pushpaswamy
- Geeta Surathkal

== Production ==
Sindhu Menon debuted as a heroine with this film at the age of thirteen. As of December 1998, two songs had been filmed.

== Soundtrack ==
The music was composed by Rajan–Nagendra and includes two songs written by D. R. Bendre and Su. Rudramurthy Shastry.

== Reception ==
Srikanth of Deccan Herald called the film "A clean and wholesome family entertainer!" A critic from The New Indian Express said that "VETERAN director-cum-producer Siddalingaiah has not kept pace with the changing trends. Though Prema is not like other re-makes, it would have been a better film had Siddalingaiah taken a little more care in casting and dialogue".
