= Jaga Mecchida Maga =

- Directed by: Hunsur Krishnamurthy
- Story by: S. Bhavanarayan
- Produced by: S. Bhavanarayan
- Starring: Rajkumar; Bharathi; K. S. Ashwath
- Cinematography: Satyanarayana Rao
- Edited by: K. Gopala Rao; Venkateswara Rao
- Music by: Satyam
- Production company: Sri Gowri Enterprises
- Release date: 1972
- Running time: 131 minutes
- Country: India
- Language: Kannada

Jaga Mechhida Maga is a 1972 Indian Kannada-language swashbuckler film directed by Hunsur Krishnamurthy and produced & written by S. Bhavanarayan. It starred Dr. Rajkumar and Bharathi. Satyam scored and composed the music to the lyrics written by Hunsur Krishnamurthy. The core concept is partially based on the legend of Excalibur – the thrust mythical sword of King Arthur – which could not be pulled out except by "the true heir of the king".

== Plot ==
Blinded by an astrologer's prediction, a King suspecting his wife's fidelity banishes her and their infant son, Aaditya. Years later a grown up Aaditya happens to fall in love with Princess Yamini and later saves honest Minister Mahadeva Sharma after he is framed for attempting to murder the King by the antagonists. In the process he is declared an outlaw by the King.

== Cast ==
- Dr. Rajkumar as Aditya, King's son
- Bharathi as Yamini, Princess
- Narasimharaju
- M. P. Shankar as Rudrasimha
- K. S. Ashwath as King
- M. V. Rajamma as Kausalyadevi, Queen
- Rajasulochana as Dancer
- Rajanand
- B. Jaya
- Shakti Prasad

== Soundtrack ==
The music of the film was composed by Satyam and the lyrics were written by Hunsur Krishnamurthy. The song "Yeri Mele Yeri" was received extremely well and considered as one of the evergreen songs.

=== Track list ===
#	Title	Singer(s)
1	"Idu Yaava Janmada"	P. B. Sreenivas, S. Janaki
2	"Olagina Aase Heluva Bashe"	P. B. Sreenivas
3	"Yeri Mele Yeri"	S. P. Balasubrahmanyam, L. R. Eswari
4	"Thaa Thai"	P. B. Sreenivas
5	"O Raja Sahane"	S. Janaki
6	"Kanasalli Nanasalli"	P. Leela

== See also ==
- Kannada films of 1972
