= Miss Leelavathi =

- Directed by: M. R. Vittal
- Written by: Korati Srinivasa Rao
- Produced by: K. S. Jagannath
- Starring: Jayanthi; K. S. Ashwath; Udaykumar
- Cinematography: S. V. Srikanth; Kumar
- Edited by: S. P. N. Krishna; T. P. Velayudham
- Music by: R. Sudarsanam
- Distributed by: Sri Rajarajeshwari
- Release date: 1965
- Running time: 162 mins
- Country: India
- Language: Kannada

Miss Leelavathi is a 1965 Indian Kannada language film directed by M. R. Vittal and written by Korati Srinivasa Rao. It stars Jayanthi in the titular role, along with Udaykumar, K. S. Ashwath, Ramesh, and others. The film won the National Award for second best film in Kannada.

The film was noted for its bold portrayal of women and was credited as the first Kannada feature film to show the leading lady in a swimsuit. It was also a musical hit, with R. Sudarsanam as the composer.

== Cast ==
- Jayanthi as Leelavathi
- K. S. Ashwath as Govindachar
- Udaykumar as Kapanipathi Rao (cameo)
- Vanisri
- M. Jayashree as Ganga
- Papamma as Kanaka
- Sooryakala
- Revathi
- R. T. Rama as Raji
- Suma (credited as Baby Suma) as young Leelavathi
- Nataraj (credited as Master Nataraj)
- Yogindra Kumar (credited as Master Yogindra Kumar)
- Ramesh as Shamanna
- Narasimharaju as Sudhakara
- Basavaraj
- Arunkumar
- Ramakrishna
- B. Hanumanthachar
- Comedian Guggu
- Suresh

== Soundtrack ==
Title	Singers	Lyrics
"Doni Saagali"	S. Janaki, Ramachandra	Kuvempu
"Nodu Baa Nodu Baa"	S. Janaki	Vijaya Narasimha
"Hiriya Naagara"	P. Jayadev	Vijaya Narasimha
"Bayake Balli"	P. B. Sreenivas, S. Janaki	Vijaya Narasimha
"Neerinalli Neenu"	P. B. Sreenivas, S. Janaki	Vijaya Narasimha

== Awards ==
- 1965 - Second Best Film in Kannada

The film screened at IFFI 1992 Kannada cinema Retrospect.
