= Hum Tum Aur Woh (1971 film) =

- Directed by: Shiv Kumar
- Starring: Vinod Khanna; Bharathi
- Music by: Kalyanji–Anandji
- Release date: 1971
- Country: India
- Language: Hindi

Hum Tum Aur Woh is a 1971 Bollywood drama film directed by Shiv Kumar. The film stars Vinod Khanna, Bharathi and Aruna Irani.

== Plot ==
Vijay is in love with Aarti and tries to woo her by disguising himself as a Sanskrit teacher. She learns about him and eventually also falls in love with him. However, Vijay and Lalita are engaged, which Aarti later discovers.

Aarti's dad Shaymlal is under threat of being killed and also businessman Mahendranath. A murder attempt on Mahendranath fails and the culprit is killed in a nightclub. There are several suspects of Mahendranath's attempted murder, including Lalita, Jagat Murari and Shyamlal.

Vijay tries to warn Shyamlal that his life is in danger, but Shyamlal does not believe him.

One day Shyamlal is killed and Aarti thinks that Vijay is the murderer, as only he is present at the site.

Will Vijay be able to prove his innocence to Aarti and the real culprit be caught?

== Cast ==
- Ashok Kumar as Mahendranath
- Vinod Khanna as Vijay
- Bharathi as Aarti
- Aruna Irani as Lalita
- Helen as Anita / Lily
- K. N. Singh as Advocate
- Jalal Agha as Charandas
- Sunder as Dayaram
- Chandrashekhar as Vikram
- Tarun Bose as Shyamal
- Sulochana Chatterjee as Mrs. Shyamlal
- Jagdish Raj as Inspector Khurana
- Mohan Sherry as Ravi
- Chaman Puri as Banwarilal
- Nisar Ahmad Ansari as Jagat Murari
- Dilip Dutt as Inspector Verma
- Tun Tun as Rosie
- Johnny Whiskey as Doctor
- Keshav Rana as Stage producer
- Jagdish Sethi as Board member
- Bhagwan Sinha as Board member
- Uma Dutt as Board member
- Kamaldeep as Board member
- Khurshid Khan as Board member
- Shantilal J Sopariwala as Board member
- Harbans Darshan M. Arora as shooter in the club

== Soundtrack ==
The songs in the film were composed by the duo Kalyanji Anandji while all the lyrics were penned by Verma Malik. The song "Priya Praneshwari" is notable as it has been written in Sanskrit, a rarity in Hindi films.

#	Song	Singer
1	"Priye Praneshwari, Hridayeshwari"	Kishore Kumar
2	"Do Baaton Ki Mujhko Tamanna"	Kishore Kumar, Asha Bhosle
3	"Haay Re Haay, Jawani Aayi Aisi Nirdayi"	Asha Bhosle
4	"Tu Mila Le Aaj Nigahon Ko"	Asha Bhosle, Vinod Khanna
5	"Husn Agar Zid Pe Aa Jaaye"	Asha Bhosle
