= Lakshmi Nivasam =

1968 Telugu film directed by V. Madhusudhana Rao

- Poster
- Directed by: V. Madhusudhana Rao
- Screenplay by: Aarudra
- Produced by: T. Govindarajan
- Starring: S. V. Ranga Rao; Anjali Devi; Krishna; Ram Mohan
- Cinematography: V. Ramamurthy
- Edited by: K. Satyam
- Music by: K. V. Mahadevan
- Production company: Venus-Padmini Combines
- Release date: 19 July 1968
- Country: India
- Language: Telugu

Lakshmi Nivasam (transl. The abode of Lakshmi) is a 1968 Indian Telugu-language drama film directed by V. Madhusudhana Rao and written by Aarudra. It is a remake of the Kannada film Dudde Doddappa (1966). The film stars S. V. Ranga Rao, Anjali Devi, Krishna, Vanisri, Sobhan Babu, Bharathi, V. Nagayya, Ram Mohan, and Padmanabham. It was released on 19 July 1968 and became commercially successful.

== Plot ==
Subbaiah, an impoverished man, becomes rich through hard work. His wish is that his children should not suffer from poverty as he had during his youth. To his dismay, his wife Sarada, sons Chandram and Raju and daughter Kalpana lead a materialistic life. The last straw for Subbaiah which prompts him to take action is when Sarada holds a resplendent party for her pet dog. Subbaiah collaborates with his former employee Gopal and his children Anand and Asha, to teach Sarada, Chandram, Raju and Kalpana a lesson and bring them to their senses.

== Cast ==
Adapted from The Hindu:

- S. V. Ranga Rao as Subbaiah
- Anjali Devi as Sarada
- Krishna as Chandram
- Vanisri as Asha
- Sobhan Babu as Anand
- Bharathi as Kalpana
- V. Nagayya as Gopal
- Ram Mohan as Giri
- Padmanabham as Rajasekharam
- Chadalavada as Gangaiah
- Vijayalalitha

== Production ==
B. R. Panthulu's production company Padmini Pictures and S. Krishnamurthy's Venus Pictures took Vijaya Studios on lease for a brief period, as they were then engaged in continuous film production. As part of their production plans, Venus chose to remake Panthulu's Kannada film Dudde Doddappa (1966) in Telugu under the banner of Venus-Padmini Combines; T. Govindarajan served as the producer and T. V. S. Sastri as the associate producer. V. Madhusudhana Rao was signed on to direct the remake, titled Lakshmi Nivasam, while Aarudra was signed on as the writer. Cinematography was handled by V. Ramamurthy, and art direction by S. Krishna Rao. K. Satyam was the editor. Bharathi and Vanisri were chosen to reprise their roles from Dudde Doddappa's Tamil remake Namma Veettu Lakshmi (1966); Bharathi also appeared in the Kannada original. The song "Dhanameraa Annitiki Moolam" was shot at Vijaya Studios, with the sets being designed by Krishna Rao in a way that would give the impression that it was shot in an outdoor location.

== Soundtrack ==
All lyrics are written by Aarudra; all music is composed by K. V. Mahadevan.

Tracklist
No.	Title	Singer(s)	Length
1.	"Navvu Navvinchu"	P. Susheela
2.	"Guvvalanti Chinnadi"	P. Susheela
3.	"Bottiro Menaka"	Madhavapeddi Satyam
4.	"College Jeetammu Kattamante Maani"	Madhavapedhi Satyam
5.	"Cheyi Cheyi Kalupu Chempa Chekkili Kalupu"	P. Susheela, P. B. Sreenivas
6.	"Oho Voorinche Ammayi Nenemi Chesedi"	P. Susheela, P. B. Sreenivas
7.	"Dhanameraa Annitiki Moolam"	Ghantasala
8.	"Ille Kovela Challani Valape Devatha"	S. Janaki
9.	"Soda Soda Andhra Soda"	Pithapuram Nageswara Rao

== Release and reception ==
Lakshmi Nivasam was released on 19 July 1968 and became commercially successful.
