= Nakkare Ade Swarga =

- Directed by: M. R. Vittal
- Screenplay by: M. R. Vittal
- Produced by: Srikanth Nahatha; Srikanth Patel
- Starring: Jayanthi; Shailashree; Jr Revathi; Thara
- Cinematography: S. V. Srikanth; D. V. Rajaram
- Edited by: S. P. N. Krishna; T. P. Velayudham
- Music by: M. Ranga Rao
- Production companies: Srikanth & Srikanth Enterprises
- Distributed by: Srikanth & Srikanth Enterprises
- Release date: 1967
- Running time: 137 minutes
- Country: India
- Language: Kannada

Nakkare Ade Swarga is a 1967 Indian Kannada-language film, directed by M. R. Vittal and produced by Srikanth Nahatha and Srikanth Patel. The film stars Narasimharaju, along with Jayanthi, Shailashree, Jr. Revathi and Thara. The film has a musical score by M. Ranga Rao. This film introduced singer S. P. Balasubrahmanyam to the Kannada film industry.

== Cast ==
- Narasimharaju
- Jayanthi
- R. Nagendra Rao
- Shailashree
- Jr. Revathi
- Thara
- Indrani
- Kamalamma
- Arunkumar (Gururajulu Naidu)
- Ranga
- Dikki Madhava Rao
- Sampath in a cameo
- Srirangamurthy
- Rajendra Prasad
- M. R. Srinivasan
- Somashekar
- A. V. K. Murthy
- Guruswamy
- Raju
- Babu

== Soundtrack ==
The music was composed by M. Ranga Rao. The film marked the debut of S. P. Balasubrahmanyam in Kannada films.

No.	Song	Singers	Lyrics	Length (m:ss)
1	"Kanasido Nanasido"	S. P. Balasubrahmanyam, P. Susheela	Vijaya Narasimha	03:46
2	"Baalondu Baavageethe"	P. B. Sreenivas, P. Susheela	R. N. Jayagopal	03:03
3	"Baalondu Baavageethe"	P. Susheela	R. N. Jayagopal	03:25
4	"Baalondu Bhaava Geethe"	P. B. Sreenivas	R. N. Jayagopal	03:17
5	"Nagabeku Nagisabeku"	P. B. Sreenivas	R. N. Jayagopal	03:11
