= Chakradhari (1977 film) =

1977 film directed by V. Madhusudhana Rao

- Theatrical release poster
- Directed by: V. Madhusudhana Rao
- Written by: Acharya Aatreya (dialogues)
- Screenplay by: V. Madhusudhana Rao
- Based on: Bhakta Kumbara
- Produced by: N. R. Anuradha Devi
- Starring: Akkineni Nageswara Rao; Vanisri
- Cinematography: P. S. Selvaraj
- Edited by: Kotagiri Gopalakrishna; Kotagiri Venkateswara Rao
- Music by: G. K. Venkatesh
- Production company: Lakshmi Films Combines
- Release date: 3 February 1977
- Running time: 142 mins
- Country: India
- Language: Telugu

Chakradhari (transl. A Person Holding a Wheel) is a 1977 Telugu-language biographical film, based on the life of the potter-turned-saint Gora Kumbhar. It was produced by N. R. Anuradha Devi under the Lakshmi Films Combines banner and directed by V. Madhusudhana Rao. The film stars Akkineni Nageswara Rao and Vanisri, with music composed by G. K. Venkatesh. It is a remake of the 1974 Kannada film Bhakta Kumbara. G.K.Venkatesh, who had composed music for the Kannada version, was chosen as the music director of this movie. 4 songs were retained from the original version.

== Cast ==
- Akkineni Nageswara Rao as Gora Kumbhar / Gora
- Vanisri as Lakshmi
- Jaya Prada as Manju
- Satyanarayana as Namadeva
- Ramakrishna as Lord Panduranga / Ranganna
- Gummadi as Lakshmi's father
- Allu Ramalingaiah as Sangoji
- Rajababu as Devada
- Mukkamala as Saint
- Nagaraju as Gynadeva
- Mada as Basavanna
- Mallikarjuna Rao
- Vennira Aadai Nirmala as Rukmini
- Rama Prabha as Tulasamma
- Jaya Malini as item number

== Soundtrack ==
Chakradhari

Film score by G. K. Venkatesh
- Released: 1977
- Genre: Soundtrack
- Length: 26:07
- Producer: G. K. Venkatesh

G. K. Venkatesh chronology
America Ammayi (1976)	Chakradhari (1977)	Ravanude Ramudayithe? (1978)

Music was composed by G. K. Venkatesh who was also the composer of the Kannada version. Four songs were retained from the original Kannada versions whereas another song was based on a Kannada song from Bangaarada Manushya movie composed by the same music director.

S. No.	Song title	Lyrics	Singers	length	Original
1	"Kanugontini Harini"	Acharya Aatreya	V. Ramakrishna	5:47	Kande Hariya Kande
2	"Naalo Evevo Vinthalu"	C. Narayana Reddy	P. Susheela	4:19	Aaha Mysooru Mallige from Bangaarada Manushya
3	"Manava Emunnadi Ee Deham"	Acharya Aatreya	V. Ramakrishna	3:58	Manava Dehavu Moole Mamsada Thadike
4	"Harinamame Madhuram"	Acharya Aatreya	V. Ramakrishna	4:20	Hari Namave Chanda
5	"Vitthala Vitthala Panduranga Vitthala"	Acharya Aatreya	S. P. Balasubrahmanyam	3:42	Vitala Vitala Panduranga Vitala
6	"Ekkadunnavu"	Acharya Aatreya	V. Ramakrishna	5:01	
7	"Pora Pokiri Pilagada"	Acharya Aatreya	P. Susheela	4:16	
8	"Ide Prathi Jeeviki"	Acharya Aatreya	P. B. Srinivas	2:07	
9	"Nuvvevarayya Nenevarayya"	Acharya Aatreya	V. Ramakrishna	3:42	

== Other versions ==
The story of Gora Kumbhar has been an inspiration for various movies and has had various versions in Indian film industry.

Year	Title	Language	Director	Cast
1944	Chakradhari	Telugu		V. Nagayya, S. Varalakshmi
1944	Chakradhari	Tamil	K. S. Gopalakrishnan	V. Nagayya, Pushpavalli
1960	Gora Kumbara	Kannada		
1967	Sant Gora Kumbhar	Marathi	Rajesh Limkar	Mangesh Diwanji, Mansi Lonkar
1974	Bhakta Kumbara	Kannada	Hunsur Krishnamurthy	Rajkumar, Leelavathi
