= Love in Bangalore =

- Directed by: Kalyan Kumar
- Produced by: Kalyan Kumar
- Starring: Kalyan Kumar; Bharathi; Ramesh; Narasimharaju
- Cinematography: R. Chittibabu
- Music by: S. P. Kodandapani
- Release date: 1966
- Country: India
- Language: Kannada

Love in Bangalore is a 1966 Indian Kannada-language film, directed and produced by Kalyan Kumar. The film stars Kalyan Kumar, Bharathi, Ramesh and Narasimharaju in the lead roles. The film has musical score by S. P. Kodandapani.

== Cast ==
- Kalyan Kumar
- Bharathi
- Ramesh
- Narasimharaju
