= Margadarshi =

- Directed by: M. R. Vittal
- Written by: T. R. Subba Rao (dialogues)
- Screenplay by: T. R. Subba Rao
- Story by: T. R. Subba Rao
- Produced by: Srikanth Patel; Srikanth Nahatha
- Starring: Rajkumar; Chandrakala; T. N. Balakrishna; Narasimharaju
- Cinematography: Srikanth; Kumar
- Edited by: S. P. N. Krishna; T. P. Velayudham
- Music by: M. Ranga Rao
- Production companies: Srikanth & Srikanth Enterprises
- Distributed by: Srikanth & Srikanth Enterprises
- Release date: 1969
- Running time: 141 minutes
- Country: India
- Language: Kannada

Margadarshi ( transl. Guide) is a 1969 Indian Kannada-language film directed by M. R. Vittal and produced by Srikanth Patel and Srikanth Nahatha. The film stars Rajkumar, Chandrakala, T. N. Balakrishna and Narasimharaju and M. Ranga Rao composed the music. It is based on a novel of the same name by T. R. Subba Rao. This was the first Kannada movie to be shot in Abhiman Studio. The song Kannillaveno Nija Kanadeno had Rajkumar lip syncing to Manna Dey's voice for the only time in his career.

== Cast ==
- Rajkumar as Srikantha
- Chandrakala as Sulochana
- T. N. Balakrishna as Chikkanarasappa, Srikantha's uncle
- Narasimharaju as Kalingaiah, village accountant
- M. P. Shankar as Rayanna
- M. Jayashree as Raji, Chikkanarasappa's wife
- Papamma as Yellajji
- Sabitha Devi as Hanuma
- B. Kamalamma
- Sampath as Chennayya
- Nagappa
- H. T. Urs as Siddanna, Rayanna's accomplice
- Pradhan
- Raghavendra Rao
- Ramarao
- Ranga as Shankar (cameo)

== Soundtrack ==
The music was composed by M. Ranga Rao.

No.	Song	Singers	Lyrics	Length (m:ss)
1	"Anu Anuvinalli"	Manna Dey	Vijaya Narasimha	03:09
2	"Nade Mundhe"	P.B. Sreenivas, P.Susheela	Kuvempu	06:29
3	"Nenedevu Nimma"	P.B.Sreenivas, S.Janaki	Vijaya Narasimha	02:53
4	"Kannilla Venu"	Manna Dey	Vijaya Narasimha	03:03
