= Gandondu Hennaru =

- Directed by: B. R. Panthulu
- Written by: M. Ramachandra
- Screenplay by: Padmini Pictures Katha Vibhaga
- Produced by: B. R. Panthulu
- Starring: Rajkumar; Bharathi Vishnuvardhan; Narasimharaju; Mynavathi
- Cinematography: A. Shanmugam; P. L. Nagappa; G. K. Ramu
- Edited by: R. Devarajan
- Music by: T. G. Lingappa
- Production company: Padmini Pictures
- Distributed by: Padmini Pictures
- Release date: 15 March 1969
- Running time: 155 min
- Country: India
- Language: Kannada

Gandondu Hennaru ( transl. One man and six women) is a 1969 Indian Kannada-language film, directed and produced by B. R. Panthulu. The film stars Rajkumar, Bharathi Vishnuvardhan, Narasimharaju and Mynavathi. The film has musical score by T. G. Lingappa. The movie was remade in Tamil in 1972 as Raman Thediya Seethai.

== Plot ==
A man visits a happy elderly couple who advise him that a wife must have 6 good qualities. These qualities help her build a happy family. He searches for a woman with those qualities. After being tricked and turned around, he finds his soulmate and returns to get the blessings of the elderly couple.

== Cast ==
- Rajkumar as Anand Rao
- Bharathi Vishnuvardhan as Veena / Malathi
- Narasimharaju as Dikki
- Mynavathi as Seetha
- T. N. Balakrishna
- Ramadevi
- Dinesh
- Premalatha
- H. R. Shastry as Shankara Bhat
- Renuka
- Hanumanthachar
- Suguna
- P. Gundu Rao
- Muguru Jejamma
- Ganapathi Bhat as Mahadevaiah
- Nagappa
- Comedian Guggu
- B. R. Panthulu
- Puttaswamy
- Narayana Rao
- M. P. Shankar as Kodanda
- Ranganath
- Siddaramaiah

== Soundtrack ==
T. G. Lingappa composed all the tracks. All songs became hits.

Track listing
No.	Title	Lyrics	Singer(s)	Length
1.	"Beladingalagi Bande"	G. V. Iyer	P. B. Srinivas, S. Janaki
2.	"Kaarina Samyora"	G. V. Iyer	L. R. Eswari
3.	"Bande Nee Bande"	Vijayanaarasimha	P. B. Srinivas
4.	"Bangara Nota Balina Thota"	Vijayanaarasimha	L. R. Eswari, P. B. Srinivas
5.	"Muttabeda Maathadabeda"	Vijayanaarasimha	Bangalore Latha, P. Nageswara Rao
6.	"Karyeshu Dasi"	Sanskrit verse	P. Leela

== Reception ==
The movie saw a theatrical run for more than 100 days and ran over 125 days in STATES theater Bangalore.
