= Annamitta Kai =

- Poster
- Directed by: M. Krishnan Nair
- Written by: A. L. Narayanan (dialogues)
- Screenplay by: G. Balasubramaniam
- Story by: G. Balasubramaniam
- Produced by: M. S. Sivaswamy
- Starring: M. G. Ramachandran; Jayalalithaa; Bharathi
- Cinematography: K. S. Prasad
- Edited by: K. Narayanan
- Music by: K. V. Mahadevan
- Production company: Ramachandra Productions
- Release date: 15 September 1972
- Running time: 164 minutes
- Country: India
- Language: Tamil

Annamitta Kai (transl. The hand that feeds) is a 1972 Indian Tamil-language film written by G. Balasubramaniam and directed by M. Krishnan Nair, starring M. G. Ramachandran, Jayalalithaa and Bharathi. It was produced by Ramachandra Productions, owned by M. S. Sivaswamy. The film was released on 15 September 1972.

== Plot ==
To right the past errors of their father, the half-brothers Durairaj and Selvaraj switch identities, making Selvaraj the heir. Durairaj goes to take care of Selvaraj's blind mother, and tries to get his brother back to a virtuous life.

== Cast ==
- M. G. Ramachandran as Durairaj (Raju)
- Jayalalithaa as Seetha
- Bharathi as Doctor Kalpana
- Pandari Bai as Sivagami, Selvaraj's mother
- M. N. Nambiar as Selvaraj
- R. S. Manohar as Kannaga Rathnam
- V. K. Ramasamy as Yezhaimalai
- Nagesh as Thangaman
- T. S. Muthaiah as Sadhasivam Bhoopathi
- Geethanjali as Ladha
- Manorama as Thangam
- Seethalakshmi as Chellamma
- S. N. Lakshmi as Lakshimi
- T. K. S. Natarajan as Estate labourer
- Master Sekhar as Durairaj (Child)
- Master Prabhakar as Selvaraj (Child)

== Production ==
The song "16 Vayathinilae 17 Pillayamma" was shot at Ashley Estate, Kuttikkanam, with 17 children. When the main cinematographer K. S. Prasad was injured before the filming of a scene, associate cameraman Babu shot the scene. This was Ramachandran's last black and white film.

== Soundtrack ==
The music was composed by K. V. Mahadevan, with lyrics by Vaali.

Song	Singers	Length
"16 Vayathinilae 17 Pillaiyammaa"	P. Susheela	03.32
"Annamitta Kai"	T. M. Soundararajan	03:56
"Onnonnaa Onnonnaa"	T. M. Soundararajan, P. Susheela	03:22
"Mayangi Vitten"	T. M. Soundararajan, P. Susheela	04:11
"Azhagukku Maru Peyar"	T. M. Soundararajan, S. Janaki	04:59

== Release ==
This was the last film of Ramachandran while he was in the Dravida Munnetra Kazhagam. A month after the release of this film, he started his own party (All India Anna Dravida Munnetra Kazhagam).
