= Janma Rahasya =

- Directed by: S. P. N. Krishna
- Screenplay by: S. P. N. Krishna
- Story by: Abdul Muthalib
- Produced by: Shrikant Nahata; Shrikant Patel
- Starring: Rajkumar; Bharathi; K. S. Ashwath; Dinesh; Dwarakish; Niranjan
- Edited by: S. P. N. Krishna
- Music by: M. Ranga Rao
- Production company: Satya Studios
- Distributed by: Venus Movies
- Release date: 1972
- Country: India
- Language: Kannada

Janma Rahasya (transl. The Mystery of One's Birth) is a 1972 Indian Kannada-language social and crime drama film directed by S. P. N. Krishna. The film stars Rajkumar and Bharathi.

== Cast ==
- Rajkumar as Kumar
- Bharathi as Shanthi
- K. S. Ashwath as Ramanath
- Pandari Bai as Kaaveramma
- Dinesh as Manohar
- Vijayasree
- Dwarakish
- Niranjan
- Keshava Murthy
- Advani Lakshmi Devi as Parvathi
- B Raghavendra Rao as Judge.
- Pradhan
- Juothilakshmi

== Soundtrack ==
The music of the film was composed by M. Ranga Rao with lyrics for the soundtrack penned by R. N. Jayagopal and M. Narendra Babu.

Janma Rahasya

Soundtrack album to Janma Rahasya by M. Ranga Rao
- Released: 1972
- Language: Kannada

=== Track list ===
#	Title	Singer(s)
1	"Beeso Gaali Ale"	P. B. Sreenivas, S. Janaki
2	"Dhummaana Yeke"	L. R. Eswari
3	"Kaveri Theeradalli"	S. Janaki
4	"Kannanchali"	S. Janaki
