= Nyayave Devaru =

- VCD cover
- Directed by: Siddalingaiah
- Produced by: B. M. Venkatesh
- Starring: Dr. Rajkumar; B. Saroja Devi
- Cinematography: S. V. Srikanth
- Edited by: N. C. Rajan; T. P. Velayudham
- Music by: Rajan–Nagendra
- Distributed by: Maharaja Movies
- Release date: 1971
- Running time: 152 minutes
- Country: India
- Language: Kannada

Nyayave Devaru is a 1971 Indian Kannada-language film directed by Siddalingaiah. It stars Dr. Rajkumar and B. Saroja Devi. The supporting cast features K. S. Ashwath, Aarathi, Dwarakish, M. P. Shankar, Dinesh, B. Jaya and Vajramuni.

== Cast ==
- Rajkumar as Raghu
- B. Saroja Devi as Shanti
- K. S. Ashwath as Chandrashekharaiah
- Dwarakish as "Mugur" Mukunda
- M. P. Shankar
- Aarathi as Lalita
- Dinesh as Narasimha
- Sampath
- B. Jaya as Saraswathi
- Vajramuni as Vajramuni
- Ganapathi Bhat
- H. R. Shastry
- Y. R. Ashwath Narayan
- Sushila Naidu
- Honnavalli Krishna

== Soundtrack ==
Nyayave Devaru

Soundtrack album by Rajan–Nagendra
- Genre: Feature film soundtrack
- Label: Saregama

The duo of Rajan–Nagendra composed the background score for the film and the soundtracks. The lyrics for the soundtracks were written by Chi. Udaya Shankar. The album consists of four soundtracks. Rajan-Nagendra reused the tune of "Aakashave Beelali Mele" for the 1983 Telugu movie Moodu Mullu as "Nee Kosam Yavvanamantha". (Note: Sri of Telugucinema.com mentions that the Telugu song was reused from a Kannada song, but does not mention the original song's name.)

Track list
No.	Title	Lyrics	Singer(s)	Length
1.	"Kunidaaduva Vayasidu"	Chi. Udaya Shankar	P. B. Sreenivas
2.	"Aakaashave Beelali Mele"	Chi. Udaya Shankar	P. B. Sreenivas
3.	"Endendu Neevu Sukhavaagiri"	Chi. Udaya Shankar	P. Susheela
4.	"Paramaathma Aadisidanthe Aaduve"	Chi. Udaya Shankar	S. P. Balasubrahmanyam
