= S. Siddalingaiah =

Indian film director (1936–2015)

Siddalingaiah
- Born: 15 December 1936
- Died: 12 March 2015 (aged 78); Bangalore, India
- Occupations: Writer, film director and producer
- Years active: 1969–1999
- Spouse: Dhanalakshmi
- Children: S. D. Murali (elder son); S.D. Suresh (younger son)
- Relatives: Atharvaa (grandson); Daniel Balaji (nephew)

Siddalingaiah (15 December 1936 – 12 March 2015) was an Indian film director, scriptwriter and producer who worked mainly in the Kannada films. He was well known for his distinct film-making style, and the industry knew him as a master of social themes and rural subject matter. He was one of the most commercially successful directors in the Kannada industry. He began his film career in 1964 as a director with Mayor Muthanna (1969). In a career that spanned 30 years, he directed over 20 films.

Seven of his best-known films starred matinee idol Rajkumar. His most popular works include Bangaarada Manushya, Bhootayyana Maga Ayyu, Nyayave Devaru, Biligiriya Banadalli, Doorada Betta and Bhoolokadalli Yamaraja. In 1993, he was awarded the Puttanna Kanagal Award for his contribution to the Kannada film industry as a director.

== Family and early life ==
Siddalingaiah joined the film industry as both a floor and a spot boy for Navajyothi studios. He became an assistant for director Shanker Singh and later worked as junior actor and assistant as the protégé of B. Vittalacharya.

Siddalingaiah's elder son Murali was an actor in Tamil and Kannada films. Murali died on the morning of 8 September 2010 in Chennai due to a massive heart attack. His younger son S. D. Suresh is an actor, producer, co-director, musician and filmmaker. His grandson Atharvaa started his acting career in Baana Kaathadi in 2010. His second grandson Akash Murali has also started his acting career. His nephew Daniel Balaji was an actor in Tamil, Kannada, Telugu and Malayalam films. Balaji also died of a heart attack in Chennai on 29 March 2024.

== Career ==
Siddalingaiah directed Mayor Muthanna in 1969 starring Rajkumar, Bharathi and Dwarakish in his film debut. He cast the same lead pair in Baalu Belagithu, Namma Samsara, Thayi Devaru and Bangaarada Manushya.

After Bangaarda Manushya, he worked with other actors including Vishnuvardhan, Ananth Nag, Lokesh and Srinivasa Murthy. He introduced his son Murali in the 1983 romantic drama Prema Parva. He also directed a Tamil film Puthir in 1986 with Murali as the lead actor. His last film, Prema Prema Prema, was released in 1999 after which he retired from directing.

== Death ==
Siddalingaiah died on 12 March 2015 in Bangalore where he had been hospitalized for treatment of H1N1 influenza.

== Filmography ==
Year	Film title	Credited as			Notes
Year	Film title	Director	Writer	Producer	Notes
1969	Mayor Muthanna	Yes			
1970	Baalu Belagithu	Yes	Yes		
1971	Namma Samsara	Yes			
1971	Thayi Devaru	Yes			
1971	Nyayave Devaru	Yes			
1972	Bangaarada Manushya	Yes	Screenplay		
1973	Doorada Betta	Yes	Screenplay		
1974	Bhootayyana Maga Ayyu	Yes	Screenplay	Yes	
1977	Hemavathi	Yes	Screenplay	Yes	
1979	Bhoolokadalli Yamaraja	Yes		Yes	
1980	Narada Vijaya	Yes		Yes	
1980	Biligiriya Banadalli	Yes			
1981	Naari Swargakke Daari	Yes			
1981	Koodi Balidare Swarga Sukha	Yes	Screenplay	Yes	
1982	Parajitha	Yes	Screenplay	Yes	
1983	Prema Parva	Yes		Yes	
1985	Ajeya	Yes	Screenplay	Yes	
1986	Puthir	Yes	Screenplay	Yes	Tamil film
1988	Sambhavami Yuge Yuge	Yes	Screenplay	Yes	
1990	Baare Nanna Muddina Rani	Yes	Screenplay	Yes	
1992	Baa Nanna Preethisu	Yes	Screenplay	Yes	
1994	Bhootayi Makkalu	Yes	Yes	Yes	
1999	Prema Prema Prema	Yes	Screenplay	Yes	
