= Thayi Devaru =

- VCD cover
- Directed by: Siddalingaiah
- Screenplay by: G. Balasubramanyam
- Story by: Vishwam
- Produced by: Chandulal Jain
- Starring: Rajkumar; Bharathi; M. V. Rajamma
- Cinematography: Chittibabu
- Edited by: N. C. Rajan
- Music by: G. K. Venkatesh
- Production company: Jain Movies
- Release date: 1971
- Running time: 136 minutes
- Country: India
- Language: Kannada

Thayi Devaru is a 1971 Indian Kannada-language drama film written by Shivam and directed by Siddalingaiah. It stars Dr. Rajkumar, M. V. Rajamma and Bharathi. The film was released under Jain Movies banner and produced by Chandulal Jain. H. R. Bhargava worked as associate director, M. S. Rajashekar as assistant director and G. K. Venkatesh was the soundtrack and score composer. The dialogues and lyrics were written by Chi. Udaya Shankar. The movie was remade in Telugu in 1973 as Kanna Koduku.

== Cast ==
- Dr. Rajkumar as Krishna
- Bharathi as Girija
- M. V. Rajamma as Gowri
- Balakrishna as Ramasubbaiah
- K. S. Ashwath as Raja Rao
- Dwarakish as Puttu Rao
- Vajramuni as Somanna "Somu"
- B. Jaya as Vanaja
- Sampath as Paramashivayya
- Surekha as Nalini
- Papamma as Gundamma
- Shakti Prasad as Rangappa
- Indra George
- B. Raghavendra Rao
- B. Mallesh
- Y. R. Ashwath Narayana
- Comedian Guggu as Janaki Ramdas "Johnny"

== Soundtrack ==
The music of the film was composed by G. K. Venkatesh and lyrics for the soundtrack written by Chi. Udaya Shankar. Venkatesh later reused the song "Haayagide" in Telugu as "Mogindi Veena" for Zamindargari Ammayi and in Tamil as "Then Sinduthe" for Ponnukku Thanga Manasu. The same song was remixed by S. A. Rajkumar for the film Sirichandana.

=== Track list ===
Title	Singer(s)
"Onde Marada"	P. B. Sreenivas
"Haayagide Ee Dina Mana"	P. B. Sreenivas, S. Janaki
"Idhu Yaava Fashiono"	S. P. Balasubrahmanyam, B. K. Sumithra
"Baalu Embudu"	L. R. Eswari
