= M. R. Vittal =

Indian film director and screenwriter

- Born: Madakshira Raghavendra Rao Vittal; 19 July 1908; Kingdom of Mysore, British India
- Died: 26 November 1996 (aged 88); Vadodara, Gujarat, India
- Occupations: Film director, screenwriter

M. R. Vittal (19 July 1908 - 26 Nov 1996) was an Indian film director and screenwriter who worked primarily Kannada cinema. He directed over 18 films in his career, with most of them being very successful and attaining a cult status. In a career spanning two decades, Vittal won three National Award and three Karnataka State Awards for his films.

Vittal is considered one of the "doyens" of Kannada cinema and is considered to have "carved a niche in the Kannada film industry by exhibiting a rare insight and boldness" while selecting the themes for his films. Most of his films were based on novels written by eminent scholars. Popular directors such as K. S. L. Swamy and K. V. Jayaram worked as assistant directors under the guidance of Vittal.

== Career ==
Midway through the shoot of Dharma Vijaya (1959), Vittal assumed the responsibilities of directing the movie and completed the shoot but refused to be credited as the director. Similarly, when his friend B. Vittalacharya suffered from typhoid and was unable to complete the shoot of Veera Kesari (1963), he completed the major portion of the shoot including the immensely popular Mellusiri Savigana song but refused to be credited as the director. His official first directorial project was the 1963 movie Nanda Deepa. The film starred Rajkumar and Harini and was produced by Vadiraj. Upon release, the film received rave reviews and went on to be considered "an all-time classic" in the history of Kannada cinema. The success got enhanced with the film receiving the prestigious National Film Award for Best Feature Film in Kannada at the 10th National Film Awards. Following this, his next film Mangala Muhurta was released in 1964. This film won the Certificate of Merit for the Second Best Feature Film at the 11th National Film Awards.

In 1965, his third directorial Miss Leelavathi based on the late Korati Srinivasa Rao's sensational novel on premarital sex created a sensation for its bold theme. Actress Jayanthi in the protagonist role, found her career break-through with this film. The film for which he wrote the screenplay, again won the Certificate of Merit for the Second Best Feature Film at the 13th National Film Awards making his third consecutive win at the National level. His subsequent films Nakkare Ade Swarga, Hannele Chiguridaga and Eradu Mukha won him laurels and awards at the Karnataka State Film Awards.

In the 1970s, Vittal directed films such as Yaara Sakshi, Bala Panjara, Professor Huchuraya and Anna Attige which were commercial hits and fetched him many accolades. His last film was the 1980 film, Varadakshine.

== Filmography ==
Year	Film	Notes
1963	Nanda Deepa	Won - National Film Award for Best Feature Film in Kannada
1964	Mangala Muhurta	Won - Certificate of Merit for the Second Best Feature Film
1965	Miss Leelavathi	Won - Certificate of Merit for the Second Best Feature Film
1966	Premamayi	
1967	Nakkare Ade Swarga	Won - Karnataka State Film Award for 2nd Best Film
1967	Manassiddare Marga	
1968	Hannele Chiguridaga	Won - Karnataka State Film Award for Best Film
1969	Margadarshi	
1969	Eradu Mukha	Won - Karnataka State Film Award for 3rd Best Film
1969	Kannu Mucchale	
1972	Yaara Sakshi	
1972	Bala Panjara	
1974	Professor Huchuraya	
1974	Anna Attige	
1975	Koodi Balona	
1977	Punarmilana	
1980	Varadakshine	
