= Namma Samsara =

- Directed by: Siddalingaiah
- Written by: Siddalingaiah
- Screenplay by: Siddalingaiah
- Story by: G. Balasubramanyam
- Produced by: Srikanth Nahata; Srikanth Patel
- Starring: Rajkumar; Bharathi
- Cinematography: Srikanth
- Edited by: S. P. N. Krishna; T. P. Velayudham
- Music by: M. Ranga Rao
- Production companies: Srikanth & Srikanth Enterprises
- Release date: 1971
- Running time: 140 minutes
- Country: India
- Language: Kannada

Namma Samsara is a 1971 Indian Kannada language drama film written and directed by Siddalingaiah. It stars Rajkumar and Bharathi. The film was released under Srikanth & Srikanth Enterprises banner and produced by Srikanth Nahata and Srikanth Patel.

== Cast ==
- Dr. Rajkumar as Krishna
- Bharathi Vishnuvardhan as Bhama
- Raja Shankar as Raamu
- B. V. Radha as Thara
- Padmanjali as Pushpa
- Advani Lakshmi Devi as Lakshmi, Krishna and Raamu's mother
- T. N. Balakrishna as Military Narayana Swamy, Thara's father
- Papamma as Paapamma Gajanana
- Dinesh as Gopal
- Niranjan as Nagabhushan, Bhama and Thara's brother
- Pradhan
- Siddalingappa
- Kamalamma
- Indrani

== Soundtrack ==
The music of the film was composed by M. Ranga Rao and lyrics for the soundtrack written by Chi. Udaya Shankar and R. N. Jayagopal. The title song sung by P. B. Sreenivas, P. Susheela and S. P. Balasubrahmanyam was hugely popular and considered one of the evergreen songs in Kannada cinema.

=== Track list ===
#	Title	Singer(s)
1	"Namma Samsara Ananda Sagara"	P. B. Sreenivas, P. Susheela, S. P. Balasubrahmanyam
2	"Hennu Endare"	P. B. Sreenivas, S. Janaki
3	"Sharanara Kaayo"	B. K. Sumitra
4	"O My Darling"	L. R. Eswari
5	"Namma Samsara" (sad)	P. B. Sreenivas, P. Susheela

== See also ==
- Kannada films of 1971
