= Ninne Pelladata (1968 film) =

1968 Telugu-language film

- Theatrical release poster
- Directed by: B. V. Srinivas; G. Viswanatham (Supervision)
- Written by: G. K. Murthy (dialogues)
- Screenplay by: B. Vittalacharya
- Story by: B. Vittalacharya
- Produced by: B. Vittalacharya
- Starring: N. T. Rama Rao; Bharathi
- Cinematography: H. S. Venu
- Edited by: K. Govinda Swamy
- Music by: Vijaya Krishna Murthy
- Production company: Sri Vital Productions
- Release date: 30 August 1968
- Running time: 128 mins
- Country: India
- Language: Telugu

Ninne Pelladata (transl. I Will Marry You) is a 1968 Telugu-language comedy film, produced by B. Vittalacharya under the Sri Vital Productions banner and directed by B. V. Srinivas. It stars N. T. Rama Rao, Bharathi and music composed by Vijaya Krishna Murthy.

== Cast ==
- N. T. Rama Rao as Umapathi
- Bharathi as Uma
- Ramana Reddy as Anjineyulu
- Raavi Kondala Rao
- Balakrishna as Ball
- Kakarala as Ganapathi
- Suryakantham as Jagadamba
- Chaya Devi
- Vijaya Lalitha as Nanchari

== Soundtrack ==
Ninne Pelladata

Film score by Vijaya Krishna Murthy
- Released: 1968
- Genre: Soundtrack
- Length: 21:32
- Producer: Vijaya Krishna Murthy

Music composed by Vijaya Krishna Murthy. Lyrics were written by C. Narayana Reddy. Music released by Audio Company.

S. No.	Song title	Singers	length
1	"Chitti Potti Papalaara"	Ghantasala	3:40
2	"Ragalanni Neeve"	P. Susheela	3:31
3	"Mallela Paanupu Undi"	P. Susheela	3:37
4	"Ninnu Chustene Chalu"	P. Susheela	3:45
5	"Pellama Naa Muddula Pellama"	Ghantasala	2:46
6	"Kalam Marindi"	Ghantasala, P. Susheela; Basaveswar; Raghuram	4:13
