= Raman Thediya Seethai (1972 film) =

- Poster
- Directed by: P. Neelakantan
- Screenplay by: Sornam
- Story by: Maa. Raa.
- Produced by: N. Kanagasabai
- Starring: M. G. Ramachandran; Jayalalithaa
- Cinematography: V. Ramamoorthy
- Edited by: K. Narayanan
- Music by: M. S. Viswanathan
- Production company: Jayanthi Films
- Release date: 13 April 1972
- Running time: 158 minutes
- Country: India
- Language: Tamil

Raman Thediya Seethai (transl. The Seetha that Raman sought) is a 1972 Indian Tamil-language romantic thriller film, directed by P. Neelakantan and written by Sornam from a story by Maa. Raa. The film stars M. G. Ramachandran and Jayalalithaa. It is a remake of the 1969 Kannada film Gandondu Hennaru. The film ran for more than 100 days in theatres and it became a box office success. Jayalalithaa won the Tamil Nadu Cinema Fan Award for Best Actress

== Plot ==
S. J. Raman, a rich industrialist tries to find his soul mate. His future ideal wife has to possess absolutely six virtues, which a nice old couple revealed to him in the bend of a way. Raman already knows the one who could fill his heart, and make it happy. Her name is Seetha, a charming representative in cosmetics. But regrettably, during the preparations of their marriage, outer elements apparently annoyed by this union, do everything to prevent it from occurring. Provided with his invaluable notebook containing six criteria, the odyssey of Raman is only the beginning.

== Cast ==
- M. G. Ramachandran as S. J. Raman
- Jayalalithaa as Seetha, Rambha and Rani
- M. N. Nambiar as Babu Bhairavan
- S. A. Ashokan as Godhanraj
- V. K. Ramasamy as Siva Shankar
- Nagesh as Krishnan (Kishtan)
- V. S. Raghavan as Karmeghan, Seetha's father
- O. A. K. Thevar as Singamuthu, the retired military man
- Manorama as Samoundhi
- G. Sakunthala as The aunty
- Ragini (Guest-star) as the actress and the dancer of the play, disguised as a man ("Yea Annaa...")
- Rama Prabha as Krishnan's love interest
- V. Gopalakrishnan as Police inspector
- Usilai Mani as Housekeeper
- Selvaraj as Barber
- Karikol Raju
- Gundu Karuppaiah as Housekeeper

== Production ==
Raman Thediya Seethai is the second film produced by the Madurai-based Jayanthi Films. Some scenes were shot in Kashmir, including the song "Nalladhu Kanne".

== Soundtrack ==
The music was composed by M. S. Viswanathan.

Song	Singers	Lyrics	Length
"En Ullam Unthan"	T. M. Soundararajan, L. R. Eswari	Kannadasan	04:29
"Machchana Mamavaa"	L. R. Eswari	Vaali	04:28
"Nalladhu Kanne"	T. M. Soundararajan, P. Susheela	Kannadasan	04:34
"Padaar Padaar Padaar"	T. M. Soundararajan, L. R. Eswari	Vaali	04:43
"Thiruvalar Selviye"	T. M. Soundararajan, B. Vasantha	Kannadasan	04:09
"Yea Annaa"	L. R. Eswari, Saibaba, Soolamangalam Rajalakshmi	Vaali	04:42

== Release and reception ==
Raman Thediya Seethai was released on 13 April 1972, and ran for over 100 days in theatres. Ananda Vikatan favourably reviewed the film, saying its flaws would appear only if viewers start thinking deeply. Jayalalithaa won the Tamil Nadu Cinema Fan Award for Best Actress.
