= Bharathi Vishnuvardhan =

Indian actress (born 1950)

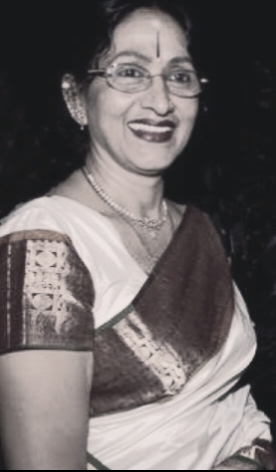
- Born: Bharathidevi Rao; 15 August 1948 (age 78); Bhadravati, Karnataka, India
- Occupation: Actress
- Years active: 1966–present
- Spouse: Vishnuvardhan (m. 1975; died 2009)
- Children: 2
- Awards: Padma Shri (2017)

Bharathi Vishnuvardhan (born 15 August 1948), also known mononymously as Bharathi, is an Indian actress known primarily for her work in Kannada cinema and television serials. She began her career in 1966, as a lead actress, with the Kannada movie Love in Bangalore though Dudde Doddappa was her first release. In a career spanning over 50 years, Bharathi has appeared in 150 films. Apart from 100 films in Kannada, she has also acted in a handful of Hindi, Tamil, Telugu and Malayalam films.

Through the course of her career, Bharathi was known for her portrayal of roles of mythological and historical characters, and also that of a student, a romantic and a rural belle. Her role in Sri Krishnadevaraya (1970) as Chennambike won her the Karnataka State Film Award for Best Actress. In 2017, she was honoured with the Padma Shri by the Government of India. She has the distinction of having paired with Dr.Rajkumar as a lead actress in all the 26 movies she acted with him and is also paired with him the most no. of times (6 movies) in those movies where he played multiple roles.

== Personal life ==
Bharathi was born in Bhadravathi on 15 August 1948, in the erstwhile Indian state of Mysore (now Karnataka), in a Marathi- speaking family. Her father V. M. Ramachandra Rao was a tailor and her mother Bhadravathi Bai was a homemaker. Bharathi studied at Malleswaram Ladies Association (M.L.A) High School and then joined Maharani's Women's Science College in Bengaluru. While she was active in both sports and dance, her ambition at the time was to become a badminton player or an athlete. She even represented Karnataka State Level Throw-ball team during her college days. Destiny willed otherwise. In 1964, photos of her dance performance caught the eye of Kannada actor Kalyan Kumar, who cast her in Love in Bangalore.

Bharathi married actor Dr. Vishnuvardhan on 27 February 1975 in Bengaluru. They have two adopted daughters Keerthi and Chandana. Dr. Vishnuvardhan died on 30 December 2009, aged 59 from a cardiac arrest.

== Career ==
Her first Kannada release was Dudde Doddappa followed by Love in Bangalore. Her sensitive portrayal of a singer in Sandhya Raga won her critical acclaim and she went on to form a successful romantic pair with Dr. Rajkumar. The pair acted together in 28 films and went on to give hit after hit until 1973, very significant among them are Mayor Muthanna, Sri Krishnadevaraya and Bangaarada Manushya. Doorada Betta was the last film of Bharathi with Dr. Rajkumar.

In 1966, Bharathi played supporting roles in two M. G. Ramachandran movies Nadodi and Chandhrodhayam which elevated her profile in the Tamil arena. She then graduated to lead heroine roles with Deiva Cheyal, Avalukendru Or Manam and Thanga Surangam, opposite stars like Muthuraman, Gemini Ganeshan, and Shivaji Ganeshan. Bharathi acted in Telugu movies like Jai Jawan (1970), Govula Gopanna (1968) and Sipayi Chinnayya with Akkineni Nageswara Rao and various Malayalam films with many leading actors, mainly in character roles.

In 1967, Bharathi was introduced to Hindi cinema by director A. Bhimsingh with Mehrban. She went on to act in several Hindi films like Sadhu Aur Shaitaan with Mehmood, Ghar Ghar Ki Kahani opposite Rakesh Roshan, Manoj Kumar's Purab Aur Paschim and Hum Tum Aur Woh with Vinod Khanna and later Mastana and Kunwaara Baap (1974).

In the 1970s she formed a popular pair with Vishnuvardhan (who later became her husband) and they starred together in blockbusters like Bhagya Jyothi, Makkala Bhagya, Devara Gudi, Nagara Hole and Bangarada Jinke (1980). After a brief hiatus, she returned to the Kannada screen in 1984 with Puttanna Kanagal's much acclaimed Runamukthalu and started her second innings as a lead heroine in slightly more mature roles, going on to star in several movies each with lead actors of the time - Anant Nag (Maneye Manthralaya, Shanthi Nivasa), Tiger Prabhakar (Bandha Mukta, Thaliya Aane), Ambareesh (Matsara) and Rajesh (Tavaru Mane). She also starred in several Hindi films in her second innings - Uttar Dakshin (1987), Izzatdaar (1990 with Dilip Kumar), Khel and Aao Pyaar Karen.

In the late 90s she acted in the Kannada Doordarshan serial Janani. In 2012, she appeared as a strict, no-nonsense sessions court judge in T.N. Seetharam's Kannada daily serial Mukta-Mukta.

Apart from acting, Bharathi has sung a few songs, a duet with T.M. Soundarrajan, a Tamil song "Thanga Nilave Nee Illamal" picturised on her and Gemini Ganesan and a Kannada song "Ee Notake Mai Matake" with her husband Vishnuvardhan for Nagara Hole. She has worked as an associate director with K. S. L. Swamy for the movies Karune Illada Kanoonu, Huli Hejje and the classic Malaya Marutha.

== Filmography ==
Below is a partial list of her films.

| Year | Film | Role | Language | Notes |
|---|---|---|---|---|
| 1966 | Dudde Doddappa | Kalpana | Kannada | First release |
| 1966 | Love in Bangalore | | Kannada | |
| 1966 | Emme Thammanna | Meena | Kannada | |
| 1966 | Sandhya Raga | | Kannada | |
| 1966 | Madhu Malathi | Madhumalathi | Kannada | |
| 1966 | Nadodi | Meena Dharmalingam | Tamil | Debut in Tamil |
| 1966 | Chandhrodhayam | Kamala | Tamil | |
| 1966 | Enga Paappa | | Tamil | |
| 1966 | Namma Veettu Lakshmi | | Tamil | |
| 1967 | Beedi Basavanna | Vijaya | Kannada | |
| 1967 | Rajashekara | Mangala | Kannada | |
| 1967 | Pattukunte Padivelu | Kalpana | Telugu | |
| 1967 | Thanga Thambi | Parvathi | Tamil | |
| 1967 | Rajadurgada Rahasya | Mangala | Kannada | |
| 1967 | Mehrban | Geeta | Hindi | |
| 1967 | Deiva Cheyal | | Tamil | |
| 1967 | Valiba Virundhu | Radha | Tamil | |
| 1967 | Naan Yaar Theriyuma | | Tamil | |
| 1967 | Aggi Dora | Jayanthi | Telugu | |
| 1967 | Gange Gowri | Gange | Kannada | |
| 1967 | Pattukunte Padivelu | | Telugu | |
| 1968 | Uyarndha Manithan | Gowri | Tamil | |
| 1968 | Sadhu Aur Shaitaan | Vidya Shastri/ Chuniya | Hindi | |
| 1968 | Amma | Mala | Kannada | |
| 1968 | Mana Samsaram | | Telugu | |
| 1968 | Ninne Pelladuta | Uma | Telugu | |
| 1968 | Nimirindhu Nil | | Tamil | |
| 1968 | Kalisina Manasulu | | Telugu | |
| 1968 | Manassakshi | Gowri | Kannada | |
| 1968 | Bangaru Gaajulu | Sarada | Telugu | |
| 1968 | Govula Gopanna | Radha | Telugu | |
| 1968 | Poovum Pottum | Amudha | Tamil | |
| 1968 | Nane Bhagyavathi | | Kannada | |
| 1968 | Lakshmi Nivasam | Kalpana | Telugu | |
| 1969 | Naangu Killadigal | | Tamil | |
| 1969 | Mayor Muthanna | Geetha | Kannada | |
| 1969 | Ardha Rathri | | Telugu | |
| 1969 | Gandondu Hennaru | Veena | Kannada | |
| 1969 | Thanga Surangam | Amutha | Tamil | |
| 1969 | Shiva Bhaktha | | Kannada | |
| 1969 | Padichakallan | | Malayalam | |
| 1969 | Sipayi Chinnayya | Shobha | Telugu | |
| 1969 | Chaduranga | | Kannada | |
| 1969 | Nil Gavani Kadhali | Malathy | Tamil | |
| 1969 | Gruhalakshmi | | Kannada | |
| 1970 | Jai Jawan | Susheela / Sujatha | Telugu | |
| 1970 | Aliya Geleya | | Kannada | |
| 1970 | Akhandudu | Jayaprada | Telugu | |
| 1970 | Baalu Belagithu | Lakshmi | Kannada | |
| 1970 | Sri Krishnadevaraya | Chinna | Kannada | Karnataka State Film Award for Best Actress |
| 1970 | Purab Aur Paschim | Gopi | Hindi | |
| 1970 | Hasiru Thorana | Meena | Kannada | |
| 1970 | Snehithi | | Tamil | |
| 1970 | Bhale Jodi | Sunitha | Kannada | |
| 1970 | Mastana | Sharada | Hindi | |
| 1970 | Ghar Ghar Ki Kahani | Seema | Hindi | |
| 1970 | Rangamahal Rahasya | Kamala | Kannada | |
| 1970 | Andariki Monagadu | | Telugu | |
| 1971 | Avalukendru Or Manam | Lalitha | Tamil | |
| 1971 | Sri Krishna Rukmini Satyabhama | Sathyabhama | Kannada | |
| 1971 | Duniya Kya Jaane | | Hindi | |
| 1971 | Kula Gourava | Radha | Kannada | |
| 1971 | Thayi Devaru | Girija | Kannada | |
| 1971 | Seema | | Hindi | |
| 1971 | Hum Tum Aur Woh | Aarti | Hindi | |
| 1971 | Andam Kosam Pandem | | Telugu | |
| 1971 | Namma Samsara | Bhama | Kannada | |
| 1971 | Meendum Vazhven | Shanthi | Tamil | |
| 1971 | Naa Thammudu | | Telugu | |
| 1972 | Janma Rahasya | | Kannada | |
| 1972 | Jeevana Jokali | | Kannada | |
| 1972 | Jaga Mecchida Maga | Yamini | Kannada | |
| 1972 | Hrudaya Sangama | Belli / Chandra | Kannada | |
| 1972 | Annamitta Kai | Dr. Kalpana | Tamil | |
| 1972 | Bangaarada Manushya | Lakshmi | Kannada | |
| 1972 | Aankh Micholi | Geeta | Hindi | |
| 1972 | Unakkum Enakkum | | Tamil | |
| 1972 | Sub Ka Saathi | Chitra | Hindi | |
| 1972 | Chitti Thalli | | Telugu | |
| 1973 | Bidugade | Shobha | Kannada | |
| 1973 | Swayamvara | | Kannada | |
| 1973 | Doorada Betta | Gowri | Kannada | |
| 1973 | Mane Belagida Sose | Radha | Kannada | |
| 1973 | Ponvandu | | Tamil | |
| 1973 | Neramu Siksha | Sujatha | Telugu | |
| 1974 | Mugguru Ammayilu | | Telugu | |
| 1974 | Anna Attige | Hema | Kannada | |
| 1974 | Kunwara Baap | Radha | Hindi | |
| 1974 | Thulasi | | Telugu | |
| 1974 | Amma Manasu | | Telugu | |
| 1974 | Anaganaga Oka Thandri | | Telugu | |
| 1974 | Adapillala Thandri | | Telugu | |
| 1974 | Harathi | | Telugu | |
| 1975 | Onde Roopa Eradu Guna | | Kannada | Cameo |
| 1975 | Devara Gudi | Suchitra | Kannada | |
| 1975 | Kaveri | Kaveri | Kannada | |
| 1975 | Kotha Kapuram | | Telugu | |
| 1975 | Bhagya Jyothi | Jyothi | Kannada | |
| 1975 | Saubhagyavathi | | Telugu | |
| 1975 | Puttinti Gowravam | | Telugu | |
| 1975 | Pandanti Samsaram | | Telugu | |
| 1975 | Kathanayakuni Katha | | Telugu | |
| 1975 | Pellade Bomma | | Telugu | |
| 1976 | Makkala Bhagya | Bhaama | Kannada | |
| 1976 | Vadhu Varulu | | Telugu | |
| 1977 | Devare Dikku | | Kannada | |
| 1977 | Manassakshi | Indira | Telugu | |
| 1977 | Nee Vazha Vendum | | Tamil | |
| 1977 | Nagara Hole | Madhu | Kannada | |
| 1978 | Madhura Sangama | Lalithambe | Kannada | Cameo |
| 1978 | Prathima | | Kannada | |
| 1978 | Sandharbha | | Kannada | |
| 1979 | Manini | Shantha | Kannada | |
| 1980 | Chitrakoota | | Kannada | |
| 1980 | Rahasya Rathri | | Kannada | |
| 1980 | Bangarada Jinke | Bhagya | Kannada | |
| 1982 | Pedda Gedda | Lawyer | Kannada | Cameo |
| 1983 | Kranthiyogi Basavanna | Akka Mahadevi | Kannada | Cameo |
| 1984 | Runamukthalu | Godavari | Kannada | |
| 1986 | Tavaru Mane | Thaayi | Kannada | |
| 1986 | Maneye Manthralaya | Susheela | Kannada | |
| 1986 | Namma Oora Devathe | | Kannada | |
| 1986 | Ella Hengasarinda | | Kannada | |
| 1986 | Uppu | Khadeeja | Malayalam | |
| 1986 | Padikkatha Padam | | Tamil | |
| 1987 | Uttar Dakshin | Bharathi | Hindi | |
| 1987 | Bandha Mukta | | Kannada | |
| 1987 | Thaliya Aane | | Kannada | |
| 1987 | Prema Kadambari | | Kannada | |
| 1988 | Shanthi Nivasa | | Kannada | |
| 1988 | Chinni Krishnudu | | Telugu | |
| 1988 | Mutthinantha Manushya | | Kannada | |
| 1989 | Yuddha Kaanda | Sharada Devi | Kannada | |
| 1990 | Matsara | Bhavana | Kannada | |
| 1990 | Izzatdaar | Sujatha | Hindi | |
| 1990 | Bannada Gejje | Vyjayanthi | Kannada | |
| 1990 | Prema Yuddham | Vyjayanthi | Telugu | |
| 1990 | Urudhi Mozhi | Abhirami | Tamil | |
| 1991 | Santhwanam | Subhadra | Malayalam | |
| 1992 | Khel | Kamini / Sharda | Hindi | |
| 1993 | Devaasuram | Yasodha | Malayalam | |
| 1994 | Aao Pyaar Karen | Anjali | Hindi | |
| 1994 | Sarigamalu | | Telugu | |
| 1995 | Dore | | Kannada | |
| 1995 | Achan Kombathu Amma Varampathu | Parvathi | Malayalam | |
| 1996 | Katta Panchayathu | Karthik's Mother | Tamil | |
| 1996 | Kaadhale Nimmadhi | Kavitha's Mother | Tamil | |
| 1997 | Varnapakittu | Sunny's mother | Malayalam | |
| 1997 | Oru Yathramozhi | Govindankutty's mother | Malayalam | |
| 1998 | Nakshatratharattu | Sreedevi | Malayalam | |
| 1998 | Sundara Pandian | Pandian's mother | Tamil | |
| 2000 | Narasimham | Induchoodan's mother | Malayalam | |
| 2001 | Karumadikkuttan | Bharathi | Malayalam | |
| 2002 | Mazhathullikilukkam | Alice John | Malayalam | |
| 2003 | Preethi Prema Pranaya | Sharadha Devi | Kannada | |
| 2005 | Maharaja | Annapoorna | Kannada | |
| 2006 | Kallarali Hoovagi | Neelamma | Kannada | |
| 2006 | Photographer | Dijo's & Joy's mother | Malayalam | |
| 2006 | Tananam Tananam | Murthy's wife | Kannada | |
| 2009 | Raaj - The Showman | Herself | Kannada | |
| 2012 | Crazy Loka | | Kannada | |
| 2012 | Kanneerinum Madhuram | Vijayakumari | Malayalam | |
| 2016 | Doddmane Hudga | Doddmane Rajeeva's sister | Kannada | |
| 2017 | Ambar Caterers | | Tulu | |
| 2018 | Raja Simha | | Kannada | |
| 2018 | Edakallu Guddada Mele | | Kannada | |
| 2019 | Kurukshetra | Kunti | Kannada | |

== Television ==
- AmruthaVarshini as Annapoorneshwari Devi - serial aired in Star Suvarna
- Sevanthi as Pramoda Devi - serial aired in Udaya TV
- Janani -serial aired in Doordarshan
- Samarppan - Doordarshan Hindi

== Awards ==
- 2017 - Padmashri - the 4th highest civilian award of India.
- 2010 - Honorary Doctorate from Karnataka State Open University.
- 1969-70 - Karnataka State Film Award for Best Actress - Sri Krishnadevaraya
