= Rajesh (Kannada actor) =

Indian Kannada actor (1932–2022)

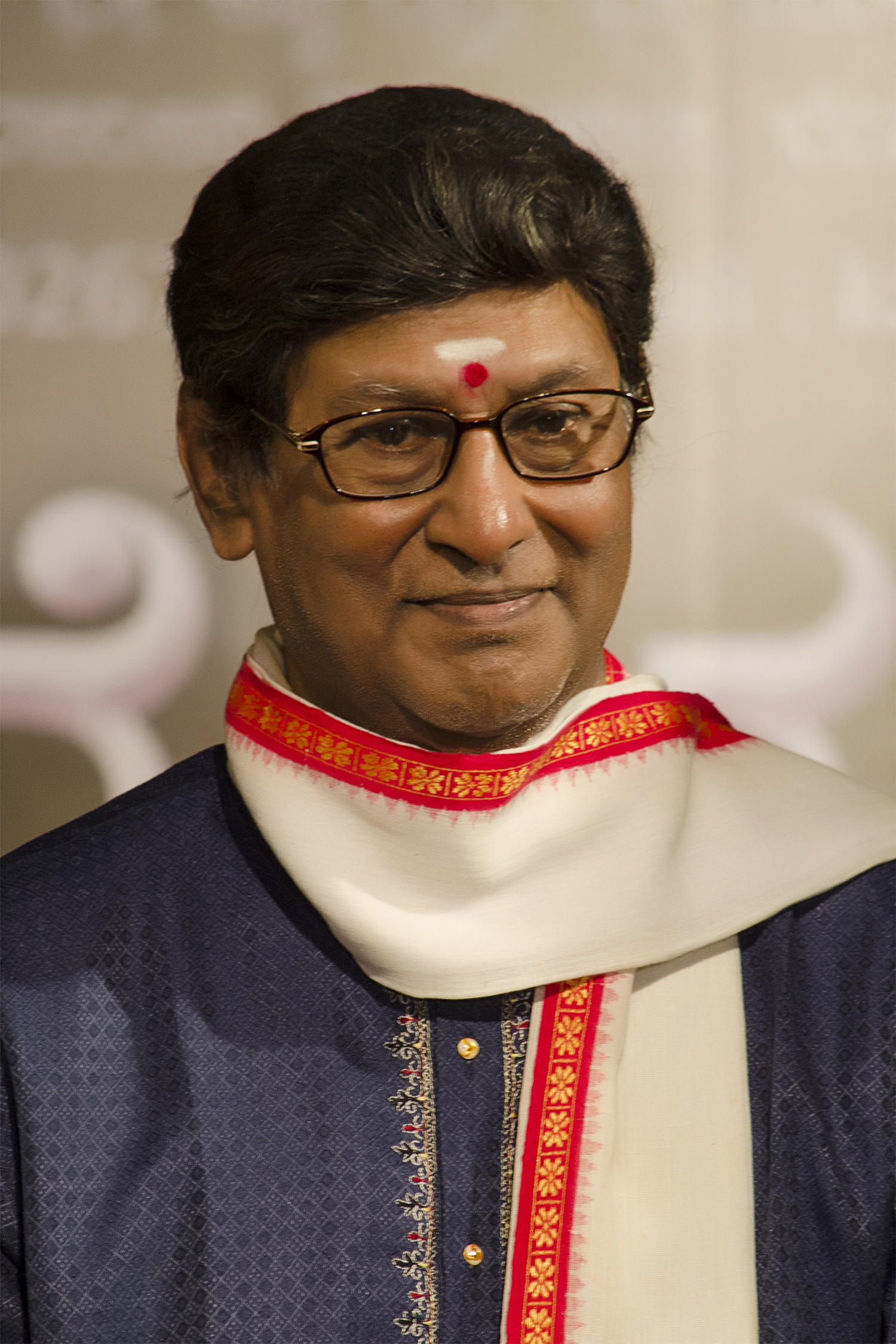
- Born: Munichowdappa/later Vidyasagar; 15 April 1932; Bangalore, Kingdom of Mysore, British Raj
- Died: 19 February 2022 (aged 89); Bangalore, Karnataka, India
- Citizenship: Indian
- Occupation: Actor
- Years active: 1963–2022
- Known for: Actor
- Children: 5, including Niveditha Arjun
- Relatives: Arjun Sarja (son-in-law)

Vidyasagar (15 April 1932 – 19 February 2022), known by his stage name Rajesh, was an Indian actor who appeared in Kannada films. Known as 'Kala Thapaswi', Rajesh was an ardent fan of literature. He appeared in many films as the lead in the late 1960s and early 1970s, and later on gravitated to strong character roles. He is the father of film actress Aasha Rani who acted in Rathasapthami with Shivrajkumar and the father-in-law of popular Kannada and Tamil actor Arjun Sarja.

Rajesh has acted in over 150 films. "Kalathapasvi Rajesh Athmakathe" is the biography of Rajesh. In 2014, he was awarded the Dr. Rajkumar Cultural Endowment Award by the Kannada Sahitya Parishat. He lived in Vidyaranyapura, Bangalore.

== Early life ==
Rajesh was born as Vidyasagar in Bangalore, India, on 15 April 1932, to a Kannada Kuruba Gowda family. He grew up watching then stars such as Thyagaraja Bhagavatar, Rajakumar and T. R. Mahalingam. He had developed interest in theatre from his childhood and joined Sudarshana Nataka Mandali without his parents' knowledge. In the name of tuition he was going for practice and the first role he got was ‘Sri Rama’. From pamphlets, his parents discovered that he had joined the theatre troupe.

== Career ==
=== Early career ===
Rajesh initially worked as a typist in government offices. He was doing what Chi Udayashanker famous cinema writer was doing in the office. In the ledger books he would keep famous novels and read them. Chi Udayashanker was sent out from office for that. Even Rajesh had faced a similar situation. Later he formed the Shakti Nataka Mandali, staging many popular plays. One fine day he got up from the sleet and started writing a play on unemployment. It was titled ‘Nirudyogi Baalu’. The play he directed later. It got good appreciation. ‘Badavana Baalu’ was his next and it continued like that. Playwright Basheer asked him to act in plays and he was in Visha Sarpa, Nandadeepa, Chandrodaya and Kittur Rani Chennamma. Thackeray role was well received.

His theatre performances eventually progressed to film roles. It was veteran director Hunsur Krishnamurthy who introduced Vidyasagar in Veera Sankalpa. He applied for 15 days leave from his job and went to Madras. While acting in this film he received an offer for ‘Sri Ramanjeneya Yuddha’. Rajakumar was Sri Rama and he was Bharatha, Udayakumar was Anjaneya. It was a successful film. While acting in his second film he received another offer from B R Panthulu for ‘Gange Gowri’. Rajkumar was ‘Shiva’ and he was ‘Maha Vishnu’. Rajesh then rejected the offer to star in ‘Jeevana Tharanga’ because of internal politicking. Rajesh did not act for two years after that. When Narayan Seth from Mumbai contacted him and took him to CV Shivashanker, he returned to acting. That was a new beginning. It was the film's producer B.S. Narayan, Late Shri Suryanarayan Rao & Late J N Shetty who rechristened Vidyasagar as Rajesh and the film was ‘Namma Ooru'.

Namma Ooru (1968) directed by C. V. Shivashankar became runaway hit. The song "Hogadhiri Sodarare" from the film made him popular. The then Finance Minister Ramakrishna Hegde gave the film 100 per cent tax exemption. After that, Rajesh was flooded with offers. He had recently acted in Nanna Gopala, a children's film directed by Lakshman. Though he started a little late compared to Udaykumar, Rajkumar and Kalyan Kumar, they were all contemporaries. In that competitive period, Rajesh stood strong for his terrific performance on the silver screen in Kannada cinema. He was not only good in acting but also in singing. He has also acted in Devara Makkalu, Prathidwani, Kranthiveera and Bidugade with Dr. Raj Kumar.

=== Later career ===
In ‘Devara Gudi’ he costarred with Vishnuvardhana in an important role. After that he had more hits like Devara Duddu, Badhu Bangaravaythu, Beluvaladha Madilalli, Mugiyadha Kathe in the 1970s and Kaliyuga, Pitamaha and Satyanarayana Pooja Phale in the 1980s.

He was of the notion that, in the 1950s onwards Honnappa Bhagavatar, Rajkumar, Udayakumar, Kalyankumar, B.R. Pantulu, K. S. Ashwath, Narasimha Raju, Balakrishna, Iyer, B. Saroja Devi, Leelavathi, Pandari Bai, MV Rajamma, Mynavathi, Vandhana, Kalpana, Jayanthi, Bharathi enriched the film industry. But Rajesh regretted that Kannada films produced in the recent times have lost their credence in the absence of good story and social commitment. The yesteryear star said "Those films had a message for the society besides providing healthy entertainment. But the films that have come after 1980 lack social commitment and are of cheap taste. The technological development and huge money being spent on films have not been used by filmmakers for the good of the society."

== Death ==
Rajesh died at a private hospital in Bangalore, on 19 February 2022, at the age of 89. He suffered from breathing complications.

== Awards ==
Rajesh was conferred the honorary doctorate by the Karnataka University in the year 2012.

== Partial filmography ==
Year	Movie (in Kannada)	Role
1963	Sri. Ramanjaneya Yuddha	
1964	Veera Sankalpa	
1967	Gange Gowri	
1968	Namma Ooru	
1969	Suvarna Bhoomi	
1969	Broker Bheeshmachari	
1969	Kappu Bilupu	
1969	Eradu Mukha	
1969	Punnya Purusha	
1969	Kaanike	
1969	Brindavana	
1969	Bhale Basava	
1970	Arishina Kumkuma	
1970	Mooru Muthugalu	
1970	Boregowda Bangalorige Banda	
1970	Namma Mane	
1970	Suka Samsara	
1970	Aaaru Mooru Vambathu.	
1970	Devara Makkalu	
1971	Poornima	
1971	Betaala Gudda	
1971	Namma Baduku	
1971	Bhale Adhrushtavo Adrustha	
1971	Bhale Bhaskara	
1971	Hennu, Honnu, Mannu	
1971	Prathidhwani	
1972	Vishakanye	
1972	Subhadra Kalyana	
1972	Ondu Hennina Kathe	
1972	Kranti Veera	
1972	Bhandavya	
1972	Mareyada Deepavali	
1973	Sahadarmini	
1973	Bidugade	
1973	CID 72	
1974	Urvashi	
1974	Grihini	
1975	Devara Gudi	
1975	Kasturi Vijaya	
1975	Mane Belaku	
1975	Sarpa Kaavalu	
1975	Kaveri	
1975	Viplava Vanithe	
1975	Ashirvada	
1975	Beluvalada Madilalli	
1975	Namma Ooru Devaru	
1976	Baduku Bangaravayithu	
1976	Mugiyada kathe	
1976	Maya manushya	
1976	Rajanarthakiya Rahasya	
1977	Devara Duddu	
1977	Renukadevi mahatme	
1977	Sose Tanda Sowbhagya	
1978	Aatma Shakthi	
1978	Vamshajyothi	
1980	Gurusarvabowma Sri Raghavendra Karune	
1980	Mayeya musuku	
1981	Premanubanda	
1981	Chadurida chitragalu	
1982	Vasanta nilaya	
1983	Aanand bhairavi	
1984	Kaliyuga	
1984	Huliyada Kala	Seetharam
1984	Aasha Kirana	
1985	Devara Mane	
1985	Thayi Mamathe	
1985	Pithamaha	Viraj
1986	Thavaru mane	
1986	Sedina Sanchu	
1986	Ella Hengasarinda	
1986	Karna	
1986	Anand	
1987	Shiva Bhaktha Markandeya	
1988	Ladies Hostel	
1988	Thayiya Aase	
1988	Nammoora Raja	
1988	Dharma Patni	
1989	Bala Hombale	
1989	Thaligagi	
1989	Raja Yuvaraja	
1989	Ondagi Balu	
1989	Jayabheri	
1990	Satyanarayana Poojaphala	
1991	Varagala Bete	
1991	Thavarumane Udugore	
1996	Karnataka Suputra	
1999	Idu Entha Premavayya	Karanam Sadashiva Rai

:Refer: Kannada films of the 1960s, Kannada films of the 1970s
