= Sampath (actor) =

Indian film actor

- Sampath (left) in Badavara Bandhu (1976)
- Born: 1904; Mysore state, British India
- Died: 17 January 1983 (aged 78–79)
- Other name: Cheluvayyangar
- Occupation: Actor

Mavinakere Srinivasayyangar Cheluvayyangar, better known by his stage name Sampath, was an Indian actor known for his work in Kannada cinema as a character actor. After beginning his career with a Tamil film Rajalakshmi in the 1930s, Sampath took a break, before working in Kannada and English plays for a major part of 1940s. His Kannada film debut with Bharathi (1949). Some of his notable films include Gandhada Gudi (1973), Sri Srinivasa Kalyana (1974), Bhakta Kumbara (1974), Eradu Kanasu (1974) and Badavara Bandhu (1983).

== Career ==
Sampath has been part of more than 130 films in Kannada. His combinations in films, with actor Dr. Rajkumar gained popularity.

== Selected filmography ==
- Bharathi (1949)
- Dallali (1952)
- Chintamani (1957)
- Nakkare Ade Swarga (1967)
- Dhana Pishachi (1967)...Rama Rao
- Sarvamangala (1968)
- Margadarshi (1969)...Chennayya
- Mallammana Pavaada (1969)...landlord
- Madhura Milana (1969)
- Gejje Pooje (1969)
- Rangamahal Rahasya (1970)
- Modala Rathri (1970)...Ramakrishnayya
- Paropakari (1970)...Veeranna
- Devara Makkalu (1970)...Krishnaswamy
- Thayi Devaru (1971)...Paramashivayya
- Sothu Geddavalu (1971)...Rao Bahadur Shivarudrappa
- Nyayave Devaru (1971)
- Sri Krishna Rukmini Satyabhama (1971)
- Kula Gourava (1971)...Thimme Gowda
- Baala Bandana (1971)...Chandrashekhar Rao
- Nari Munidare Mari (1972)...Seetharamaiah
- Uttara Dakshina (1972)
- Bala Panjara (1972)...Ramanna
- Bidugade (1973)...Sadashiva Rao
- Onde Roopa Eradu Guna (1975)
- Mayura (1975)...Veerasharma
- Thrimurthy (1975)...Rajaram
- Daari Tappida Maga (1975)
- Katha Sangama (1976)
- Premada Kanike (1976)
- Badavara Bandhu (1976)
- Naa Ninna Mareyalare (1976)...Mohan Rao
- Olavu Geluvu (1977)
- Shani Prabhava (1977)
- Bhagyavantharu (1977)
- Babruvahana (1977)
- Shankar Guru (1978)...Gurumurthy
- Huliya Haalina Mevu (1979)...Somaiah
- Ravichandra (1980)...cameo
- Havina Hede (1981)
- Jeevakke Jeeva (1981)...Lakshman Rao
- Thayiya Madilalli (1981)...Inspector Vishwanath
- Bhagyada Belaku (1981)...Ramanath Rao
- Hosa Belaku (1982)
- Baadada Hoo (1982)
