= List of songs recorded by P. Susheela =

P. Susheela is an Indian playback singer, associated with the South Indian cinema for over six decades. She has been recognized by both the Guinness Book of World Records and the Asia Book of Records for singing the most songs in different Indian languages by a female singer.

== Recorded film songs ==
This is only a partial list; P. Susheela has sung over 25,000 songs in Tamil, Telugu, Kannada, Malayalam and Hindi.

== Tamil film songs ==
Year	Film	Song	Composer(s)	Writer(s)	Co-artist(s)
1953	Petrathai (D)	"Yaedhukku Azhathaai Yaedhukku"	Pendyala Nageshwara Rao	M. S. Subramaniam	A. M. Rajah
1953	Manam Pola Mangalyam	"Aavadhum Pennale"	Addepalli Rama Rao	Kanaka Surabhi	V. J. Varma
1955	Vedan Kannappa		R. Sudarshanam		
1956	Tenali Raman	"Chandana Charchita Nila Kalebara"	Viswanathan–Ramamoorthy	Geetha Govindam	
1956	Tenali Raman	"Thennavan Thaai Nattu Singaarame"	Viswanathan–Ramamoorthy	Kannadasan	
1958	Engal Kudumbam Perisu	"Raadhaa Maadhava Vinodha Raaja"	T. G. Lingappa	Ku. Saa. Krishnamurthi	T. M. Soundararajan
1958	Engal Kudumbam Perisu	"Sugamaana Andhi Velai"	T. G. Lingappa	Ku. Saa. Krishnamurthi	
1959	Abalai Anjugam	"Vennilaa Kudai Pidikka"	K. V. Mahadevan	Suratha & Udumalai Narayana Kavi	T. R. Mahalingam
1959	Veerapandiya Kattabomman	"Inbam Pongum Vennila"	G. Ramanathan	Ku. Ma. Balasubramaniam	P. B. Sreenivas
1959	Vaazha Vaitha Deivam	"Kaaveri Thaan Singari"	K. V. Mahadevan		T. M. Soundararajan
1969	Pattanathil Bhootham	"Kannil Kandathellam"	R. Govardhanam	Kannadasan	T. M. Soundararajan
1969	Pattanathil Bhootham	"Antha Sivagami"	R. Govardhanam	Kannadasan	T. M. Soundararajan
1969	Pattanathil Bhootham	"Ulagathil Sirandhadhu"	R. Govardhanam	Kannadasan	T. M. Soundararajan, A. L. Raghavan
1969	Pattanathil Bhootham	"Edhirpaaramal Virundhaali"	R. Govardhanam	Kannadasan	
1969	Pattanathil Bhootham	"Naan Yaar"	R. Govardhanam	Kannadasan	
1971	Annai Velankanni	"Karunai Kadale"	G. Devarajan		
1971	Annai Velankanni	"Karunai Mazhaiyae"	G. Devarajan		
1976	Moondru Mudichu	"Naanoru Kadhanayagi"	M. S. Viswanathan	Kannadasan	L. R. Eswari
1977	16 Vayathinile	"Chavanthi Poo"	Ilaiyaraaja	Kannadasan	Malaysia Vasudevan
1982	Pagadai Panirendu	"Varavendum Maharajan"	K. Chakravarthy		S. P. Balasubrahmanyam

== Kannada songs ==
The following is a partial list of Kannada songs recorded by her:

=== 1950s–1960s ===
Year	Film	Song	Music director	Writer	Co-singer	Note(s)
1954	Madiddunno Maraya	"Nalidu Nalidu"	P. Shamanna	Hunsur Goutham	R. Balasaraswathi Devi	
1956	Bhagya Chakra	"Lokareethi Ariyadara"	Vijaya Bhaskar	Geethapriya	A. M. Rajah	
1956	Hari Bhakta	"Hariye Ninna Virasa"	G. K. Venkatesh	Gundu Rao		
1956	Hari Bhakta	"Naagambike Naa"	G. K. Venkatesh	Gundu Rao		
1956	Hari Bhakta	"Neenaade Doora"	G. K. Venkatesh	Gundu Rao		
1956	Ohileshwara	"Nidhiyonda Ninagagi"	G. K. Venkatesh	Ku Ra See		
1956	Ohileshwara	"O Janma Daatha"	G. K. Venkatesh	Ku Ra See		
1956	Sadarame	"Vanarani Ellinda"	R. Sudarsanam-R. Govardhanam	Ku Ra See		
1956	Sadarame	"Karunalu Kaayo Deva"	R. Sudarsanam-R. Govardhanam	Ku Ra See		
1956	Sadarame	"Baluveya Degulada"	R. Sudarsanam-R. Govardhanam	Ku Ra See		
1956	Sadarame	"Birugaali Badida"	R. Sudarsanam-R. Govardhanam	Ku Ra See		
1956	Sadarame	"Kaanada Henna"	R. Sudarsanam-R. Govardhanam	Ku Ra See	T. M. Soundararajan	
1956	Sadarame	"Premave Lokada"	R. Sudarsanam-R. Govardhanam	Ku Ra See	A. M. Rajah	
1957	Bettada Kalla	"Vayyari Vayyari"	S. M. Subbaiah Naidu	Ku Ra See		
1957	Bettada Kalla	"Bandide Vasantha Masa"	S. M. Subbaiah Naidu	Ku Ra See	P. B. Sreenivas	
1957	Bhookailasa	"Naakavane Naachisuva"	R. Sudarshanam - R. Govardhanam	Ku Ra See		
1957	Bhookailasa	"Baaleya Hrudayava"	R. Sudarshanam - R. Govardhanam	Ku Ra See		
1957	Bhookailasa	"Ee Raathri Maharaathri"	R. Sudarshanam - R. Govardhanam	Ku Ra See		
1958	School Master	"Sompaada Sanjevele"	T. G. Lingappa	K. Prabhakara Sastry	T. G. Lingappa	
1958	School Master	"Radha Maadhava"	T. G. Lingappa	K. Prabhakara Sastry	T. G. Lingappa	
1958	Sri Krishna Garudi	"Ee Mayaveno"	Pendyala Nageshwara Rao	Hunsur Krishnamurthy		
1959	Mahishasura Mardini	"Gaana Panchama Veda"	G. K. Venkatesh	Chi. Sadashivaiah		
1960	Aasha Sundari	"Jaya Jaya Gangadhara"	Susarla Dakshinamurthy	Hunsur Krishnamurthy	S. Varalakshmi	
1960	Aasha Sundari	"Oh Sakhi Amruthamayavi"	Susarla Dakshinamurthy	Hunsur Krishnamurthy	S. Janaki	
1960	Aasha Sundari	"Saagi Baa Raaja"	Susarla Dakshinamurthy	Hunsur Krishnamurthy		
1960	Aasha Sundari	"Jo Jo Rajakumara"	Susarla Dakshinamurthy	Hunsur Krishnamurthy		
1960	Aasha Sundari	"Chitthava Kenakida"	Susarla Dakshinamurthy	Hunsur Krishnamurthy		
1960	Aasha Sundari	"Akalanka Neenendu"	Susarla Dakshinamurthy	Hunsur Krishnamurthy		
1960	Makkala Rajya	"Maleye Suridu Baa"	T. G. Lingappa	K. Prabhakara Sastry		
1960	Rani Honnamma	"Ettha Hogenu"	Vijaya Bhaskar	Ku Ra See		
1960	Rani Honnamma	"Malagida Haavidu"	Vijaya Bhaskar	Ku Ra See		
1960	Rani Honnamma	"Naa Thaalalarenu"	Vijaya Bhaskar	Ku Ra See		
1960	Rani Honnamma	"Haarutha Doora Doora"	Vijaya Bhaskar	Ku Ra See	P. B. Sreenivas	
1961	Kittur Chennamma	"Thanukaragadavaralli"	T. G. Lingappa	Akka Mahadevi		
1961	Kittur Chennamma	"Nayanadali Doreyiralu"	T. G. Lingappa	G. V. Iyer		
1961	Nagarjuna	"Manadolu Thumbithu"	Rajan-Nagendra	Hunsur Krishnamurthy		
1961	Vijayanagarada Veeraputhra	"Madhura Mohana"	Vishwanathan-Ramamurthy	R. N. Jayagopal		
1961	Vijayanagarada Veeraputhra	"Dariyalli Nithihudeke"	Vishwanathan-Ramamurthy	R. N. Jayagopal		
1961	Vijayanagarada Veeraputhra	"Vaiyyara Thorutha"	Vishwanathan-Ramamurthy	R. N. Jayagopal		
1962	Gaali Gopura	"Anuragade Nee Paadaleke"	T. G. Lingappa	G. V. Iyer	P. B. Sreenivas	
1962	Swarna Gowri	"Nudimana Shivaguna"	M. Venkataraju	S. K. Karim Khan	P. B. Sreenivas	
1962	Swarna Gowri	"Neethiya Meresi"	M. Venkataraju	S. K. Karim Khan		
1962	Swarna Gowri	"Belagiso"	M. Venkataraju	S. K. Karim Khan		
1963	Chandra Kumara	"Manamohana Charanadali"	T. Chalapathi Rao; M. Venkataraju	S. K. Karim Khan		
1963	Chandra Kumara	"Gathi Kaaneno"	T. Chalapathi Rao; M. Venkataraju	S. K. Karim Khan		
1963	Jenu Goodu	"Jenirulu Jothegoodiralu"	Vijaya Krishnamurthy	Ku Ra See	P. B. Sreenivas	
1963	Malli Maduve	"Olavanthe Geluvanthe"	G. K. Venkatesh	Ku Ra See	P. B. Sreenivas	
1963	Malli Maduve	"Maduve Emba Santhege"	G. K. Venkatesh	Ku Ra See		
1963	Mana Mecchida Madadi	"Thutiya Mele Thunta"	Vijaya Bhaskar	Ku Ra See	P. B. Sreenivas	
1963	Saaku Magalu	"Naanu Andhalaade"	T. G. Lingappa	K. Prabhakar Sastry		
1963	Valmiki	"Jhalala Jhalala Jala Dhare"	Ghantasala	K. Prabhakar Sastry		
1963	Valmiki	"Anuragadale Anandanele"	Ghantasala	K. Prabhakar Sastry	Ghantasala	
1963	Veera Kesari	"Oh Nama Bharada"	Ghantasala	Sorat Ashwath		
1963	Veera Kesari	"Rama Lakshmanaru"	Ghantasala	Sorat Ashwath	Ghantasala	
1963	Veera Kesari	"Prajara Maathanu"	Ghantasala	Sorat Ashwath	Ghantasala	
1963	Veera Kesari	"Mellusire Savigana"	Ghantasala	Ku Ra See	Ghantasala	
1964	Amarashilpi Jakanachari	"Cheluvantha Chennigane"	S. Rajeswara Rao	Chi. Sadashivaiah		
1964	Amarashilpi Jakanachari	"Eno Entho Jhum Enditu"	S. Rajeswara Rao	Chi. Sadashivaiah	Ghantasala	
1964	Amarashilpi Jakanachari	"Manase Mudavaagide"	S. Rajeswara Rao	Chi. Sadashivaiah	Ghantasala	
1964	Amarashilpi Jakanachari	"Nillu Nee Nillu Nee"	S. Rajeswara Rao	Chi. Sadashivaiah	P. B. Sreenivas	
1964	Amarashilpi Jakanachari	"Surasundaranga Krishna"	S. Rajeswara Rao	Chi. Sadashivaiah	P. B. Sreenivas	
1964	Chinnada Gombe	"Nodalli Meravanige"	T. G. Lingappa	R. N. Jayagopal		
1964	Chinnada Gombe	"Thavare Hookereyalli"	T. G. Lingappa	Vijaya Narasimha	P. B. Sreenivas	
1964	Muriyada Mane	"Kedige Hoo Mudidu"	Vijaya Krishnamurthy	Ku Ra See	P. B. Sreenivas	
1964	Muriyada Mane	"Anda Chendavethake"	Vijaya Krishnamurthy	Ku Ra See		
1964	Navajeevana	"Leelamaya Hey Deva"	Rajan-Nagendra	Sorat Ashwath		
1964	Navajeevana	"Preethi Honale"	Rajan-Nagendra	Sorat Ashwath		
1964	Pathiye Daiva	"Kannemba Kaneyinda"	Vijaya Bhaskar	R. N. Jayagopal	P. B. Sreenivas	
1964	Prathigne	"Manada Anandanu"	S. Hanumantha Rao	Chi. Sadashivaiah		
1964	Prathigne	"Oho Entha Cheluva"	S. Hanumantha Rao	Chi. Sadashivaiah	P. B. Sreenivas	
1965	Beratha Jeeva	"Enu Beku Enu Beda"	Vijaya Bhaskar	Ku Ra See	P. B. Sreenivas	
1965	Beratha Jeeva	"Namma Dhatiya"	Vijaya Bhaskar	Ku Ra See	P. B. Sreenivas	
1965	Beratha Jeeva	"Ankada Parade Jaarida Mele"	Vijaya Bhaskar	Ku Ra See		
1965	Chandrahasa	"Hunnimeya Chanda"	S. Hanumantha Rao	Chi. Sadashivaiah	P. B. Sreenivas	
1965	Maduve Madi Nodu	"Manase Naa Yaaro"	Ghantasala	Hunsur Krishnamurthy		
1965	Maduve Madi Nodu	"Venkatachala"	Ghantasala	Hunsur Krishnamurthy	Ghantasala	
1965	Maduve Madi Nodu	"Yaaro Yaaro"	Ghantasala	Hunsur Krishnamurthy	Ghantasala	
1965	Maduve Madi Nodu	"Alabeda Alabeda"	Ghantasala	Hunsur Krishnamurthy	B. K. Sumitra, Raghavulu	
1965	Naga Pooja	"Belagisu Belagisu"	T. G. Lingappa	Geethapriya		
1965	Naga Pooja	"Baramma Kamadhenu"	T. G. Lingappa	Geethapriya		
1965	Naga Pooja	"Neethiya Meresi"	T. G. Lingappa	Geethapriya		
1965	Satya Harishchandra	"Neenu Namage Sikki"	Pendyala Nageshwara Rao	Hunsur Krishnamurthy	P. Leela	
1965	Satya Harishchandra	"Ananda Sadana Aravinda Nayana"	Pendyala Nageshwara Rao	Hunsur Krishnamurthy		
1965	Vathsalya	"Maagida Hannu"	Vijaya Krishnamurthy	Sorat Ashwath	P. B. Sreenivas	
1965	Vathsalya	"Mareyalaagada Hindina"	Vijaya Krishnamurthy	Sorat Ashwath	P. B. Sreenivas	
1965	Vathsalya	"Nee Nachaleke"	Vijaya Krishnamurthy	Sorat Ashwath		
1966	Badukuva Daari	"Thayi Thandeyu"	T. Chalapathi Rao	Hunsur Krishnamurthy		
1966	Badukuva Daari	"Maagikala Saayankala"	T. Chalapathi Rao	Hunsur Krishnamurthy	P. B. Sreenivas, B. Vasantha	
1966	Katari Veera	"Kivi Mathonda Hele"	Upendra Kumar	Sorat Ashwath		
1966	Katari Veera	"Chengu Chengendu Haaruva"	Upendra Kumar	Sorat Ashwath		
1966	Thoogudeepa	"Helale Haadale"	Vijaya Bhaskar	R. N. Jayagopal		
1967	Bangarada Hoovu	"Oduva Nadhi Saagarava"	Rajan-Nagendra	Chi. Udayashankar	P. B. Sreenivas	
1967	Bangarada Hoovu	"Nee Nadeva Haadiyalli"	Rajan-Nagendra	Chi. Udayashankar	S. Janaki	
1967	Belli Moda	"Belli Modada Anchininda"	Vijaya Bhaskar	R. N. Jayagopal	P. B. Sreenivas	
1967	Belli Moda	"Ideega Nee Doorade"	Vijaya Bhaskar	R. N. Jayagopal	P. B. Sreenivas	
1967	Chakra Theertha	"Ninna Roopa Kannali"	T. G. Lingappa	R. N. Jayagopal	P. B. Sreenivas	
1967	Devara Gedda Manava	"Yaarenna Sari Saatiye"	Rajan-Nagendra	Hunsur Krishnamurthy	S. Janaki	
1967	Manassiddare Marga	"Ee Jeevanavu Bevu Bella"	M. Ranga Rao	Vijaya Narasimha	P. B. Sreenivas	
1967	Manassiddare Marga	"Ade Jana Ade Mana"	M. Ranga Rao	Vijaya Narasimha	P. B. Sreenivas	
1967	Manassiddare Marga	"Hosa Hennu Nija"	M. Ranga Rao	Vijaya Narasimha		
1967	Manassiddare Marga	"Iniya Balleya Karana"	M. Ranga Rao	Vijaya Narasimha		
1967	Nakkare Ade Swarga	"Kanasido Nanasido"	M. Ranga Rao	Vijaya Narasimha	S. P. Balasubrahmanyam	
1967	Nakkare Ade Swarga	"Ee Haayi Innelli"	M. Ranga Rao	Vijaya Narasimha		
1967	Nakkare Ade Swarga	"Baalondu Bhavageethe"	M. Ranga Rao	R. N. Jayagopal		
1967	Nakkare Ade Swarga	"Baalondu Bhavageethe"	M. Ranga Rao	R. N. Jayagopal	P. B. Sreenivas	
1967	Premakku Parmitte	"Usire Odala Thoreyuveya"	Vijaya Bhaskar	R. N. Jayagopal		
1967	Premakku Parmitte	"Mugulu Nageya Mallige"	Vijaya Bhaskar	R. N. Jayagopal		
1968	Anandakanda	"Neeniddarenu Hatthira"	Vijaya Bhaskar	R. N. Jayagopal		
1968	Anandakanda	"Thannane Rathri"	Vijaya Bhaskar	R. N. Jayagopal		
1968	Anandakanda	"Orvala Maganaagi"	Vijaya Bhaskar	R. N. Jayagopal		
1968	Anna Thamma	"Kande Kandukonde"	Vijaya Bhaskar	Ku Ra See		
1968	Anna Thamma	"Nudiya Hagaranavethake"	Vijaya Bhaskar	Ku Ra See		
1968	Anna Thamma	"Naya Bhaya Vinaya"	Vijaya Bhaskar	Ku Ra See		
1968	Anna Thamma	"Iniya Kogileya"	Vijaya Bhaskar	Ku Ra See	Renuka, Bangalore Latha	
1968	Atthegondu Kaala Sosegondu Kaala	"Henne Ninna Palige"	Satyam	R. N. Jayagopal		
1968	Atthegondu Kaala Sosegondu Kaala	"Ennarasa Chennarasa"	Satyam	R. N. Jayagopal		
1968	Bedi Bandavalu	"Neerinalli Aleya Ungura"	R. Sudarsanam	R. N. Jayagopal	P. B. Sreenivas	
1968	Bedi Bandavalu	"Elu Swaravu Seri"	R. Sudarsanam	R. N. Jayagopal		
1968	Bhagyada Bagilu	"Nee Nagalu"	Vijaya Bhaskar	Chi. Udayashankar	P. B. Sreenivas	
1968	Bhagyada Bagilu	"Nee Nanna Jotheyiralu"	Vijaya Bhaskar	Chi. Udayashankar	P. B. Sreenivas	
1968	Dhoomakethu	"Aaha Aaha Idenu Nade"	T. G. Lingappa	R. N. Jayagopal		
1968	Dhoomakethu	"Rangu Ranginaata"	T. G. Lingappa	R. N. Jayagopal		
1968	Gandhinagara	"Nee Mudida Mallige"	Satyam	Chi. Udayashankar	P. B. Sreenivas	
1968	Hannele Chiguridaga	"Hoovu Cheluvella Nandendithu"	M. Ranga Rao	R. N. Jayagopal		
1968	Hannele Chiguridaga	"Baara Olidu Baara"	M. Ranga Rao	R. N. Jayagopal		
1968	Hannele Chiguridaga	"Malle Maale"	M. Ranga Rao	R. N. Jayagopal	L. R. Eswari	
1968	Manassakshi	"Galubili Yaake"	G. K. Venkatesh	Vijaya Narasimha		
1968	Manassakshi	"Baala Padake"	G. K. Venkatesh	Vijaya Narasimha		
1968	Manassakshi	"Mai Nimiri Ninthu"	G. K. Venkatesh	Ku Ra Sree		
1968	Manku Dinne	"Madhu Madhura Adhara"	Vijaya Bhaskar	Chi. Udayashankar	P. B. Sreenivas	
1968	Mannina Maga	"Idhenu Sabhyathe"	Vijaya Bhaskar	Geethapriya		
1968	Mannina Maga	"Mellage Nadeyole"	Vijaya Bhaskar	Geethapriya		
1968	Rowdy Ranganna	"Dharanige Giri Bharave"	Satyam	Chi. Udayashankar		
1968	Sarvamangala	"Nannavalu Nannedeya"	Satyam	K S Narasimha Swamy	P. B. Sreenivas	
1968	Sarvamangala	"Undaada Bahudu"	Satyam	Janapada Sahitya		
1968	Sarvamangala	"Jo Jo Jagajyothi"	Satyam	Ku Ra Sree		
1968	Simha Swapna	"Yaavooru Yaavooru"	S. Dakshinamoorthy	Chi. Udayashankar	P. B. Sreenivas	
1969	Bhale Raja	"O Iniya O Geleya"	Satyam	Sorat Ashwath		
1969	Bhale Raja	"Kannu Eneno Katheyella"	Satyam	Sorat Ashwath		
1969	Bhale Raja	"Ye Mukka Thaa Rokka"	Satyam	Sorat Ashwath		
1969	Chikkamma	"Jo Jo Jo Laali"	T. V. Raju	R. N. Jayagopal		
1969	Eradu Mukha	"Baaligondu Bayake"	Vijaya Bhaskar	Chi. Udayashankar	P. B. Sreenivas	
1969	Kappu Bilupu	"Amma Ninna Tholinalli"	R. Rathna	R. N. Jayagopal		
1969	Kappu Bilupu	"Ee Chandada Maneyalli"	R. Rathna	R. N. Jayagopal		
1969	Makkale Manege Manikya	"Nanna Chandra"	Vijaya Bhaskar	Geethapriya		
1969	Makkale Manege Manikya	"Maremachidaru Ee Nachike"	Vijaya Bhaskar	Geethapriya	P. B. Sreenivas	
1969	Mallammana Pavada	"Sharanembe Naa"	Vijaya Bhaskar	K. Prabhakar Sastry		
1969	Mallammana Pavada	"Hadona Olavina Ragamale"	Vijaya Bhaskar	K. Prabhakar Sastry	P. B. Sreenivas	
1969	Mallammana Pavada	"Huccharalla Neevu"	Vijaya Bhaskar	Vijaya Narasimha		
1969	Margadarshi	"Ohoho Entha Gandu"	M. Ranga Rao	Vijaya Narasimha		
1969	Margadarshi	"Nade Munde Nade Munde"	M. Ranga Rao	Vijaya Narasimha	P. B. Sreenivas	
1969	Mukunda Chandra	"Naa Ninage Nee Nanage"	G. K. Venkatesh	Chi. Udayashankar	P. B. Sreenivas	
1969	Punarjanma	"Kannadathi Nammodathi"	Dulal Sen	R. N. Jayagopal	P. B. Sreenivas	
1969	Punarjanma	"Godhooli Haruva"	Dulal Sen	R. N. Jayagopal	P. B. Sreenivas	
1969	Punarjanma	"Hakki Haado Chilipili"	Dulal Sen			
1969	Punya Purusha	"Eli Naanu Eli Neenu"	Satyam	Chi. Udayashankar	P. B. Sreenivas	
1969	Suvarna Bhoomi	"Bhale Sanchugara"	Vijaya Bhaskar	Ku Ra See		

=== 1970s–1980s ===
Year	Film	Song	Music director	Writer	Co-singer	Note(s)
1970	Aaru Mooru Ombhatthu	"Savira Henna"	Vijaya Bhaskar	Vijaya Narasimha	P. B. Sreenivas	
1970	Anireekshita	"Ondu Balliyalonde"	Vijaya Bhaskar	R. N. Jayagopal		
1970	Anireekshita	"Bandaramma Bandaru"	Vijaya Bhaskar	R. N. Jayagopal		
1970	Baalu Belagithu	"Cheluvaada Muddaada"	Vijaya Bhaskar	Chi. Udayashankar	P. B. Sreenivas	
1970	Bhoopathi Ranga	"Naagareeka Maanava"	Vijaya Bhaskar	Geethapriya		
1970	Bhoopathi Ranga	"Goodalli Thaaihakki"	Vijaya Bhaskar	Geethapriya		
1970	Boregowda Bangalorige Banda	"Andaduru Bengaluru"	Rajan-Nagendra	Chi. Udayashankar		
1970	Boregowda Bangalorige Banda	"Alli Illi Hudukutha"	Rajan-Nagendra	Chi. Udayashankar	S. P. Balasubrahmanyam	
1970	C.I.D. Rajanna	"Nannaleno Hosa Bhavane"	Satyam	Chi. Udayashankar	P. B. Sreenivas, S. P. Balasubrahmanyam	
1970	Devara Makkalu	"Bekenu Saamaanu"	G. K. Venkatesh	Chi. Udayashankar		
1970	Lakshmi Saraswathi	"Chandira Bhoomige"	Vijaya Bhaskar	Chi. Udayashankar		
1970	Lakshmi Saraswathi	"Nooru Varusha Baaliri"	Vijaya Bhaskar	Chi. Udayashankar		
1970	Lakshmi Saraswathi	"Gruhini Neenu"	Vijaya Bhaskar	Chi. Udayashankar		
1970	Lakshmi Saraswathi	"Chandira Bhoomige"	Vijaya Bhaskar	Chi. Udayashankar	P. B. Sreenivas	
1970	Mooru Mutthugalu	"Sriranga Pattanake"	Rajan-Nagendra	Chi. Udayashankar		
1970	Namma Mane	"Kan Kan Biduva"	Upendra Kumar	Sorat Ashwath	P. B. Sreenivas	
1970	Namma Mane	"Nanna Manadi"	Upendra Kumar	Sorat Ashwath	P. B. Sreenivas	
1970	Namma Mane	"Chikka Vayasalle"	Upendra Kumar	Sorat Ashwath		
1970	Namma Mane	"Ele Mare Hannagi"	Upendra Kumar	Vijaya Narasimha		
1970	Nanna Thamma	"Krishna Krishna"	Ghantasala	Ku Ra See		
1970	Nanna Thamma	"Aa Murali"	Ghantasala	Ku Ra See		
1970	Nanna Thamma	"Neene Nenedu"	Ghantasala	Ku Ra See		
1970	Nanna Thamma	"Nee Nagalu Hagalalli"	Ghantasala	Ku Ra See	P. B. Sreenivas	
1970	Rangamahal Rahasya	"Oduveya Haduveya"	Satyam	Chi. Udayashankar		
1970	Sri Krishnadevaraya	"Thirupathi Girivasa"	T. G. Lingappa	K. Prabhakara Sastry	P. B. Sreenivas, S. Janaki	
1971	Baala Bandana	"Chinnadantha Naadige"	G. K. Venkatesh	Chi. Udayashankar	P. B. Sreenivas	
1971	Baala Bandana	"Namma Mane"	G. K. Venkatesh	Chi. Udayashankar		
1971	Baala Bandana	"Kalikeye Jaana"	G. K. Venkatesh	Vijaya Narasimha		
1971	Bhale Bhaskar	"Nannedeya Maathella"	Satyam	Chi. Udayashankar	P. B. Sreenivas	
1971	Jathakarathna Gundajoyisa	"Gelathi Cheluve"	S. P. Kodandapani	Vijaya Narasimha		
1971	Jathakarathna Gundajoyisa	"Kai Mele Kai Haaki"	S. P. Kodandapani	Vijaya Narasimha	S. P. Balasubrahmanyam	
1971	Kalyani	"Ninna Mukha Aravinda"	Vijaya Bhaskar	Geethapriya		
1971	Kasidre Kailasa	"O Mugile Belmugile"	Satyam	R. N. Jayagopal		
1971	Kasidre Kailasa	"Chalagaara Jothegaara"	Satyam	R. N. Jayagopal		
1971	Kasturi Nivasa	"Nee Bandu Ninthaaga"	G. K. Venkatesh	R. N. Jayagopal	P. B. Sreenivas	
1971	Kasturi Nivasa	"Elle Iru Hege Iru"	G. K. Venkatesh	Chi. Udayashankar		
1971	Kula Gowrava	"Ondu Maathu"	T. G. Lingappa	R. N. Jayagopal	P. B. Sreenivas	
1971	Kula Gowrava	"Yaare Bandavanu"	T. G. Lingappa	R. N. Jayagopal		
1971	Kula Gowrava	"Raaga Ninnadu Bhava Nannadu"	T. G. Lingappa	R. N. Jayagopal		
1971	Kula Gowrava	"Ye Hudugi Ye Bedagi"	T. G. Lingappa	Chi. Udayashankar	P. B. Sreenivas	
1971	Naguva Hoovu	"Gulaabi O Gulaabi"	G. K. Venkatesh	R. N. Jayagopal		
1971	Naguva Hoovu	"Ee Shubhadinade"	G. K. Venkatesh	R. N. Jayagopal		
1971	Namma Samsara	"Namma Samsara Ananda Sagara"	M. Ranga Rao	R. N. Jayagopal	P. B. Sreenivas, S. P. Balasubrahmanyam	
1971	Namma Samsara	"Namma Samsara (sad)"	M. Ranga Rao	R. N. Jayagopal	P. B. Sreenivas	
1971	Nyayave Devaru	"Endendu Neevu Sukhavagiri"	Rajan-Nagendra	Chi. Udayashankar		
1971	Papa Punya	"Naavu Bandeva"	Padma Charan	Mahadeva Banakara		
1971	Papa Punya	"Manadalli Nenevalli"	Padma Charan	Mahadeva Banakara		
1971	Papa Punya	"Aaradirali Deevige"	Padma Charan	Mahadeva Banakara		
1971	Sakshatkara	"Olave Jeevana"	M. Ranga Rao	K. Prabhakara Sastry	P. B. Sreenivas	
1971	Sakshatkara	"Kaadiruvalo Krishna Radhe"	M. Ranga Rao	K. Prabhakara Sastry		
1971	Sakshatkara	"Phalisitu Olavina"	M. Ranga Rao	K. Prabhakara Sastry		
1971	Sakshatkara	"Olave Jeevana Sakshatkara"	M. Ranga Rao	K. Prabhakara Sastry		
1971	Samshaya Phala	"Ideega Nee Doorade"	Salil Choudhary	Ku Ra See	P. B. Sreenivas	
1971	Samshaya Phala	"Kuniyutha Jhanana Jhana"	Salil Choudhary	Ku Ra See		
1971	Samshaya Phala	"Harusha Doorada"	Salil Choudhary	Ku Ra See		
1971	Sedina Kidi	"Siri Kai Serida"	M. Poornachandra Rao	Vijaya Narasimha		
1971	Sedina Kidi	"Rasika Madhura Geetheya"	M. Poornachandra Rao	Vijaya Narasimha		
1971	Sedina Kidi	"Jhum Jhum Nachike"	M. Poornachandra Rao	Vijaya Narasimha		
1971	Sedina Kidi	"Dinavu Dinavu Baaradantha"	M. Poornachandra Rao			
1971	Sharapanjara	"Kodagina Kaveri"	Vijaya Bhaskar	K. Prabhakara Sastry	P. B. Sreenivas	
1971	Sharapanjara	"Biligiri Rangayya"	Vijaya Bhaskar	K. Prabhakara Sastry		
1971	Sharapanjara	"Utthara Dhruvadhim"	Vijaya Bhaskar	Da Ra Bendre	P. B. Sreenivas	
1971	Sharapanjara	"Sandesha Meghasandesha"	Vijaya Bhaskar	Vijaya Narasimha		
1971	Sharapanjara	"Hadinaalku Varusha"	Vijaya Bhaskar	Vijaya Narasimha		
1971	Thande Makkalu	"Sanje Kempu Moodithu"	G. K. Venkatesh	R. N. Jayagopal		
1971	Thande Makkalu	"Sanje Kempu Moodithu"	G. K. Venkatesh	R. N. Jayagopal	S. P. Balasubrahmanyam	
1972	Bangaarada Manushya	"Aaha Mysooru Mallige"	G. K. Venkatesh	Chi. Udayashankar	P. B. Sreenivas	
1972	Bangaarada Manushya	"Baala Bangaara"	G. K. Venkatesh	Hunsur Krishnamurthy		
1972	Bangaarada Manushya	"Hani Hani Goodidare"	G. K. Venkatesh	Vijaya Narasimha	P. B. Sreenivas, S. P. Balasubrahmanyam, Mothi	
1972	Jeevana Jokali	"Cheluva Baruthane"	Vijaya Bhaskar	Geethapriya		
1972	Jeevana Jokali	"Ninna Baluku Nadigeyalli"	Vijaya Bhaskar	Geethapriya	P. B. Sreenivas	
1972	Kranti Veera	"Kaniveya Kelagina Hennu"	Satyam	Chi. Udayashankar	P. B. Sreenivas	
1972	Kulla Agent 000	"Eko Eno Ellu Illi"	Rajan-Nagendra	Chi. Udayashankar		
1972	Naagarahaavu	"Karpoorada Gombe Naanu"	Vijaya Bhaskar	R. N. Jayagopal		
1972	Naagarahaavu	"Kathe Heluve Nanna"	Vijaya Bhaskar	Chi. Udayashankar		
1972	Naagarahaavu	"Sangama Sangama"	Vijaya Bhaskar	Vijaya Narasimha	P. B. Sreenivas	
1972	Nanda Gokula	"Manada Maathige"	Vijaya Bhaskar	Vijaya Narasimha		
1972	Nari Munidare Mari	"Maatheya Mamatheya"	Rajan-Nagendra	Geethapriya		
1972	Nari Munidare Mari	"Gopi Lola Hey Gopala"	Rajan-Nagendra	Geethapriya		
1972	Sipayi Ramu	"Thangali Sangeetha"	Upendra Kumar	R. N. Jayagopal		
1972	Sipayi Ramu	"Kanna Notadalle Nee Kaadabeda"	Upendra Kumar	R. N. Jayagopal		
1972	Sipayi Ramu	"Nidireyu Sadaa"	Upendra Kumar	R. N. Jayagopal	P. B. Sreenivas	
1972	Vishakanye	"Ado Samayadalli"	Rajan-Nagendra	Hunsur Krishnamurthy		
1972	Vishakanye	"Thaaynadigagi Neenu"	Rajan-Nagendra	Hunsur Krishnamurthy		
1972	Vishakanye	"Eno Ideno Yaako"	Rajan-Nagendra	Hunsur Krishnamurthy		
1972	Yaava Janmada Maitri	"Madhura Murali Lola"	Vijaya Bhaskar	Geethapriya		
1972	Yaava Janmada Maitri	"Jyothi Kirana Kande"	Vijaya Bhaskar	Geethapriya		
1973	Beesida Bale	"Kasthuri Kannada Kulada"	Rajan-Nagendra	Arasu Kumar	S. P. Balasubrahmanyam	
1973	Bharathada Rathna	"Anuragada Araadhane"	R. Sudarsanam	Jayadev Kumar	P. B. Sreenivas	
1973	Bidugade	"Bedagina Henna"	M. Ranga Rao	Chi. Udayashankar	P. B. Sreenivas	
1973	Bidugade	"Baanige Neeliya"	M. Ranga Rao	Chi. Udayashankar	P. B. Sreenivas	
1973	Bidugade	"Nanna Putta Samsara"	M. Ranga Rao	Chi. Udayashankar		
1973	CID 72	"Heege Iruva Haayagiruva"	Vijaya Bhaskar	Chi. Udayashankar	P. B. Sreenivas	
1973	Cowboy Kulla	"Ondenno Onti Hennu"	Rajan-Nagendra	Chi. Udayashankar		
1973	Doorada Betta	"Preethine Aa Dyavru"	G. K. Venkatesh	Chi. Udayashankar	P. B. Sreenivas	
1973	Edakallu Guddada Mele	"Virahaa Nooru Nooru"	M. Ranga Rao	Vijaya Narasimha		
1973	Edakallu Guddada Mele	"Santhosha Sangeetha"	M. Ranga Rao	Vijaya Narasimha	S. P. Balasubrahmanyam	
1973	Gandhada Gudi	"Arere Gini Rama"	Rajan-Nagendra	Chi. Udayashankar		
1973	Sahadharmini	"Chandirana Sheethalate"	R. Rathna	Sathyanarayana	P. B. Sreenivas	
1973	Swayamvara	"Priyasakhi Priyamvade"	Rajan-Nagendra	R. N. Jayagopal		
1973	Swayamvara	"Ninna Kanna Kannadiyalli"	Rajan-Nagendra	R. N. Jayagopal	P. B. Sreenivas	
1973	Thriveni	"Manasu Naviru"	Upendra Kumar	Ku Ra See	S. P. Balasubrahmanyam	
1974	Gruhini	"Suprabhathavu Ninage"	M. Ranga Rao	Vijaya Narasimha		
1974	Gruhini	"Haa Bhale Mojidu"	M. Ranga Rao	Vijaya Narasimha		
1974	Gruhini	"Olidu Baa Shivane"	M. Ranga Rao	Vijaya Narasimha		
1974	Maga Mommaga	"Irulali Kanasugalu"	M. Ranga Rao	Chi. Udayashankar	Mahesh	
1974	Maha Thyaga	"Yaava Janmada Geleya"	Rajan-Nagendra	V. Seetharamaiah		
1974	Mannina Magalu	"Hunnime Bandide"	S. Rajeshwara Rao	Chi. Udayashankar		
1974	Mannina Magalu	"Iniya Sukha Needuve"	S. Rajeshwara Rao	Chi. Udayashankar		
1974	Nanoo Balabeku	"Baalara Deva Vinayaka"	R. Rathna	K. S. Sathyanarayana		
1974	Nanoo Balabeku	"Shathakoti Tharegalu"	R. Rathna	K. S. Sathyanarayana		
1974	Professor Huchuraya	"Doora Doora Alle Nilli"	Rajan-Nagendra	R. N. Jayagopal	P. B. Sreenivas	
1974	Sri Srinivasa Kalyana	"Swami Srinivasa"	Rajan-Nagendra	Chi. Udayashankar		
1975	Aasha Soudha	"Thooro Gaalige"	P. L. Sriramulu	Sorat Ashwath		
1975	Aashirwada	"Anna Baruva"	Upendra Kumar	R. N. Jayagopal		
1975	Devara Gudi	"Naa Bayasada Bhagya"	Rajan-Nagendra	Chi. Udayashankar	P. B. Sreenivas	
1975	Devara Kannu	"O Iniya Nee Elliruve"	T. G. Lingappa	Vijaya Narasimha		
1975	Devara Kannu	"Ninna Neenu Maretharenu"	T. G. Lingappa	Chi. Udayashankar		
1975	Kalla Kulla	"Saaka Ishte Saaka"	Rajan-Nagendra	Chi. Udayashankar	S. Janaki	
1975	Kaveri	"Shrungeri Geeravani"	M. Ranga Rao	Vijaya Narasimha		
1975	Mane Belaku	"Malle Hoove Naachide"	M. Ranga Rao	Chi. Udayashankar	S. P. Balasubrahmanyam	
1975	Namma Oora Devaru	"Chinna Haari Jaari"	Upendra Kumar	Basavaraj Kesthur		
1975	Onde Roopa Eradu Guna	"Pamagarisa Nee Nagalu"	Salil Choudhary	R. N. Jayagopal	S. P. Balasubrahmanyam	
1975	Onde Roopa Eradu Guna	"Jila Jila Nendu"	Salil Choudhary	R. N. Jayagopal	S. P. Balasubrahmanyam	
1975	Sarpa Kaavalu	"Eke Chapala Yaake"	Satyam	R. N. Jayagopal	S. P. Balasubrahmanyam	
1975	Viplava Vanithe	"Bidu Siduku"	M. Ranga Rao	Chi. Udayashankar		
1976	Aparadhi	"Naguva Ninna Mogada"	Satyam	Chi. Udayashankar	S. P. Balasubrahmanyam	
1976	Aparadhi	"Oh Yammi Baarammi"	Satyam	Chi. Udayashankar	S. P. Balasubrahmanyam	
1976	Badavara Bandhu	"Naidhileyu Hunnimeya"	M. Ranga Rao	Chi. Udayashankar		
1976	Baduku Bangaravayithu	"Priyathama Naanaaro"	M. Ranga Rao	Chi. Udayashankar		
1976	Bangarada Gudi	"Ellirali Hegirali"	G. K. Venkatesh	Chi. Udayashankar		
1976	Bangarada Gudi	"Ninadene Irali"	G. K. Venkatesh	Chi. Udayashankar	S. P. Balasubrahmanyam	
1976	Chiranjeevi	"Maguve Nanna Ogatu Kelu"	Vijaya Bhaskar	Vijaya Narasimha		
1976	Devaru Kotta Vara	"Kangale Karagi Neeradaga"	M. Ranga Rao	Chi. Udayashankar		
1976	Hosilu Mettida Hennu	"Hoonage Daivada"	T. G. Lingappa	R. N. Jayagopal	S. P. Balasubrahmanyam	
1976	Hosilu Mettida Hennu	"Saavira Preshne Kelide"	T. G. Lingappa	R. N. Jayagopal		
1976	Hosilu Mettida Hennu	"Anda Chanda"	T. G. Lingappa	R. N. Jayagopal		
1976	Phalitamsha	"Ee Chendina Aata"	Vijaya Bhaskar	R. N. Jayagopal	S. P. Balasubrahmanyam	
1976	Soothrada Bombe	"Beeso Gaalige Balli"	Satyam	Chi. Udayashankar	S. P. Balasubrahmanyam	
1976	Soothrada Bombe	"Ee Shubha Samaya"	Satyam	Chi. Udayashankar		
1976	Soothrada Bombe	"Ninna Seridaaga Kannu"	Satyam	Chi. Udayashankar	P. B. Sreenivas	
1977	Anuroopa	"Neeniruvudu Nijavadaru"	Rajeev Taranath - C. Ashwath	P. Lankesh	S. P. Balasubrahmanyam	
1977	Banashankari	"Balli Balliyalu"	Vijaya Bhaskar	R. N. Jayagopal		
1977	Bhagyavantharu	"Ninna Snehake"	Rajan-Nagendra	Chi. Udayashankar	Dr. Rajkumar	
1977	Dhanalakshmi	"Nille Neenalle"	M. Ranga Rao	Satyanarayana	S. P. Balasubrahmanyam	
1977	Ganda Hendathi	"Hennina Maathige"	Vijaya Bhaskar	Chi. Udayashankar	S. P. Balasubrahmanyam	
1977	Geddavalu Naane	"Geddavalu Naane"	M. Ranga Rao	R. N. Jayagopal	K. J. Yesudas	
1977	Geddavalu Naane	"Pili Pili Kannina"	M. Ranga Rao	R. N. Jayagopal		
1977	Kadgicchu	"Endoo Agalada"	Satyam	Hunsur Krishnamurthy		
1977	Kittu Puttu	"Nillo Kaamanna"	Rajan-Nagendra	Chi. Udayashankar	S. Janaki	
1977	Lakshmi Nivasa	"Enendu Naa Haadali"	T. G. Lingappa	Chi. Udayashankar		
1977	Manassinanthe Mangalya	"Thampu Mavina Thota"	Ramesh Naidu	M. Narendra Babu	S. P. Balasubrahmanyam	
1977	Manassinanthe Mangalya	"Aaduva Thandanaano"	Ramesh Naidu	M. Narendra Babu		
1977	Manassinanthe Mangalya	"Sarigama Padanisa"	Ramesh Naidu	M. Narendra Babu	Gayathri Sisters	
1977	Punarmilana	"Bannisalaarada"	M. Ranga Rao	Ku Ra See		
1977	Sahodarara Savaal	"O Nallane Savi Mathonda"	Satyam	Chi. Udayashankar	S. P. Balasubrahmanyam	
1977	Shani Prabhava	"Anandada Nandana"	M. Ranga Rao	Yoganarasimha	S. P. Balasubrahmanyam	
1977	Shani Prabhava	"Belagithu Kailasade"	M. Ranga Rao	Yoganarasimha		
1977	Shani Prabhava	"Haayagi Malagu"	M. Ranga Rao	Yoganarasimha		
1977	Shubhashaya	"Amma Ennuva"	M. Ranga Rao	R. N. Jayagopal		
1977	Shubhashaya	"Prema Veeneya"	M. Ranga Rao	R. N. Jayagopal		
1977	Shubhashaya	"Mamatheya Balliyali"	M. Ranga Rao	R. N. Jayagopal		
1977	Sri Renukadevi Mahatme	"Priyathama Swagatha"	S. Hanumatha Rao	Chi. Udayashankar	S. P. Balasubrahmanyam	
1978	Amarnath	"Olidiha Managala"	Vijaya Bhaskar	R. N. Jayagopal	S. P. Balasubrahmanyam	
1978	Kiladi Kittu	"Madilalli Maguvaagi"	Mohan Kumar	R. N. Jayagopal	Vishnuvardhan	
1978	Maathu Tappada Maga	"Mareyada Harushada"	Ilaiyaraaja	R. N. Jayagopal		
1978	Muyyige Muyyi	"Ee Mouna Eke Geleya"	Satyam	Doddarangegowda	S. P. Balasubrahmanyam	
1978	Muyyige Muyyi	"Belli Chukki"	Satyam	Vijaya Narasimha	P. B. Sreenivas, S. P. Balasubrahmanyam, Bangalore Latha	
1978	Singaporenalli Raja Kulla	"Nannantha Gandilla"	Rajan-Nagendra	Chi. Udayashankar	K. J. Yesudas, S. P. Balasubrahmanyam, S. Janaki	
1978	Sneha Sedu	"Saaku Saaku"	S. Rajeshwara Rao	Chi. Udayashankar	S. P. Balasubrahmanyam	
1978	Sneha Sedu	"Entha Sogasu"	S. Rajeshwara Rao	Chi. Udayashankar	S. P. Balasubrahmanyam	
1978	Sneha Sedu	"Badavara Maathigu"	S. Rajeshwara Rao	Chi. Udayashankar	S. P. Balasubrahmanyam, Ramakrishna	
1978	Spandana	"Bande Baruthava Kaala"	C. Ashwath	Lakshminarayana Bhat		
1978	Vamsha Jyothi	"Elliya Naanu"	G. K. Venkatesh	R. N. Jayagopal	S. P. Balasubrahmanyam	
1978	Vasantha Lakshmi	"Devanu Thanda"	Vijaya Bhaskar	Chi. Udayashankar		
1979	Balina Guri	"Harinama Hayagi"	Chakravarthy	Hunsur Krishnamurthy	S. Janaki	
1979	Huliya Haalina Mevu	"Aase Heluvaase"	G. K. Venkatesh	Chi. Udayashankar	Dr. Rajkumar, S. Janaki	
1979	Kaadu Kudure	"Iva Yaava Oorina"	Chandrashekhara Kambara	Chandrashekhara Kambara		
1979	Mallige Sampige	"Ee Nimma Roopa"	Vijaya Bhaskar	Chi. Udayashankar		
1979	Manini	"Naanu Naanendu"	K. V. Mahadevan	Sri Shankarananda		
1979	Naa Ninna Bidalaare	"Endendigu Naa Ninna"	Rajan-Nagendra	Chi. Udayashankar		
1979	Vijay Vikram	"Nee Kuniyutha Oduve"	Satyam	Chi. Udayashankar		
1980	Aarada Gaaya	"Nanna Baala Baninali"	Satyam	Chi. Udayashankar		
1980	Anurakthe	"Honnada Lokadali"	Ashwath-Vaidi	Doddarangegowda		
1980	Dhairya Lakshmi	"Ecchara Thangi"	G. K. Venkatesh	Chi. Udayashankar		
1980	Guru Sarvabhowma Sri Raghavendra Karune	"Oorella Belakago Deepavali"	M. Ranga Rao	Hunsur Krishnamurthy	Bangalore Latha	
1980	Guru Sarvabhowma Sri Raghavendra Karune	"Oorella Nalidaado"	M. Ranga Rao	Hunsur Krishnamurthy		
1980	Haddina Kannu	"Ee Cheluvina Olavina"	Satyam	Chi. Udayashankar	S. P. Balasubrahmanyam	
1980	Hanthakana Sanchu	"Kan Kan Thumbide"	Vijaya Bhaskar	Chi. Udayashankar		
1980	Hrudaya Deepa	"Jeevanave Hoobanavu"	Upendra Kumar	R. N. Jayagopal		
1980	Kaalinga	"Durugutti Nodabedayya"	Satyam	R. N. Jayagopal	S. P. Balasubrahmanyam	
1980	Nanna Rosha Nooru Varusha	"Thottige Thottu"	Satyam	R. N. Jayagopal		
1980	Ondu Hennu Aaru Kannu	"Nimbeya Hannantha"	S. Rajeshwara Rao	Chi. Udayashankar		
1980	Ondu Hennu Aaru Kannu	"Neene Neene Neene"	S. Rajeshwara Rao	Chi. Udayashankar	S. P. Balasubrahmanyam	
1980	Ondu Hennu Aaru Kannu	"Ondu Hennu Illi"	S. Rajeshwara Rao	Chi. Udayashankar		
1980	Vajrada Jalapatha	"Jokina Hennu Nee"	Ramesh Naidu	Chi. Udayashankar	S. P. Balasubrahmanyam	
1980	Vajrada Jalapatha	"Vayyari Mugava Nodu"	Ramesh Naidu	Chi. Udayashankar	S. P. Balasubrahmanyam	
1980	Vajrada Jalapatha	"Eno Adeno"	Ramesh Naidu	Chi. Udayashankar	S. Janaki	
1980	Shumbha Nishumbha	"Hubballiyinda Haaribanda"	Upendra Kumar	R. N. Jayagopal		
1981	Avali Javali	"Romanchana Nalme Jeevana"	Satyam	Chi. Udayashankar	S. P. Balasubrahmanyam	
1981	Devara Aata	"Ee Soundaryake"	Satyam	Chi. Udayashankar	S. P. Balasubrahmanyam	
1981	Mangala Suthra	"Beeso Galiyalli"	R. Rathna	C. M. Venkatesh	P. B. Sreenivas	
1981	Naga Kala Bhairava	"Olavina Udaya"	M. Ranga Rao	Vijaya Narasimha	K. J. Yesudas	
1981	Rajeshwari	"Nangu Ningu"	R. Damodar	Karim Khan		
1981	Rajeshwari	"Hey Dayakari"	R. Damodar	Karim Khan	Prabhakara Rao	
1981	Sangeetha	"Agali Iralaareno"	Chandrashekhara Kambara	Chandrashekhara Kambara		
1981	Sangeetha	"Banda Saradaara"	Chandrashekhara Kambara	Chandrashekhara Kambara		
1981	Snehitara Savaal	"Alla Nee Illi Barayya"	Satyam	R. N. Jayagopal	S. P. Balasubrahmanyam, S. P. Sailaja	
1981	Swapna	"Shrirasthu Madhumagane"	Satyam	R. N. Jayagopal	P. B. Sreenivas	
1981	Thayiya Madilalli	"Allondu Lokavuntu"	Satyam	Chi. Udayashankar		
1981	Lakshmi Prasanna	"Mathinneke Beku"	Pendyala Srinivasan	Chi. Udayashankar		
1981	Lakshmi Prasanna	"Galiyu Nalidide"	Pendyala Srinivasan	R. N. Jayagopal	V. Ramakrishna	
1982	Betthale Seve	"Notada Sanchyaake"	Rajan-Nagendra	Doddarange Gowda	S. P. Balasubrahmanyam	
1982	Bhaktha Gnanadeva	"Preethi Banada"	G. K. Venkatesh	Hunsur Krishnamurthy		
1982	Boodi Mucchida Kenda	"Olavina Gaala Seleyuthide"	G. K. Venkatesh	Chi. Udayashankar	S. P. Balasubrahmanyam	
1982	Chellida Raktha	"O Maavana Magale"	Satyam	Chi. Udayashankar	S. P. Balasubrahmanyam	
1982	Dharma Dari Thappithu	"Jaaneyagiru Nanna Mallige"	Ramesh Naidu	Narendra Babu		
1982	Mareyalagada Kathe	"Iruvaaga"	Upendra Kumar	Chi. Udayashankar		
1982	Praya Praya Praya	"Achari Appanna"	Upendra Kumar	R. N. Jayagopal	S. P. Balasubrahmanyam	
1982	Raga Thala	"Shruthiheenavayitu"	M. Ranga Rao	Nandagopala Reddy	S. P. Balasubrahmanyam	
1983	Aakrosha	"Nanage Neene Kanda"	Satyam	Chi. Udayashankar	S. P. Balasubrahmanyam	
1983	Aasha	"Dance With Me"	G. K. Venkatesh	R. N. Jayagopal	S. P. Balasubrahmanyam	
1983	Avala Neralu	"Rangeri Banthu"	Joy	Vijaya Narasimha		
1983	Chakravyuha	"Nija Heluvenu Amma"	Sankar Ganesh	Chi. Udayashankar	S. Janaki	
1983	Hosa Theerpu	"Barthiyene Hudugi"	G. K. Venkatesh	Chi. Udayashankar	S. P. Balasubrahmanyam	
1983	Hosa Theerpu	"Ee Namma Gandu"	G. K. Venkatesh	Chi. Udayashankar	S. P. Balasubrahmanyam	
1983	Hosa Theerpu	"Hatthe Paisakke"	G. K. Venkatesh	Chi. Udayashankar		
1983	Keralida Hennu	"Kanniruvudu Eke"	Chakravarthy	Chi. Udayashankar	S. P. Balasubrahmanyam	
1983	Makkale Devaru	"Ananda Krishnana"	Satyam	R. N. Jayagopal	S. P. Balasubrahmanyam	
1983	Manege Banda Mahalakshmi	"Mallige Mogge"	Satyam	R. N. Jayagopal		
1983	Manege Banda Mahalakshmi	"Munjane"	Satyam	Sloka (traditional)		
1983	Simha Gharjane	"Nanna Ninna Aase"	Satyam	Chi. Udayashankar	S. P. Balasubrahmanyam	
1983	Thayiya Nudi	"Irabeku Irabeku"	Satyam	Chi. Udayashankar	P. B. Sreenivas, Ramesh	
1983	Thirugu Baana	"Andada Chendada Giniye"	Satyam	R. N. Jayagopal	S. P. Balasubrahmanyam	
1983	Aadarsha	"Baare Nanna"	M. Ranga Rao	P. B. Sreenivas	P. Jayachandran	
1984	Ajnathavasa	"Eke Helu Eke"	Ramesh Naidu	Chi. Udayashankar		
1984	Baddi Bangaramma	"Nanna Srimathi"	Chakravarthy	Doddarange Gowda	Raja	
1984	Baddi Bangaramma	"Prathi Dinavu"	Chakravarthy	Doddarange Gowda	Ramesh	
1984	Baddi Bangaramma	"Ibbare Naavillibbare"	Chakravarthy	Doddarange Gowda	P. Jayachandran	
1984	Baddi Bangaramma	"Ee Nanna Kannalli"	Chakravarthy	R. N. Jayagopal	S. P. Balasubrahmanyam	
1984	Baddi Bangaramma	"Thaalayya Swalpa Neenu"	Chakravarthy	R. N. Jayagopal	Ramesh, Raja	
1984	Chanakya	"Mohini Nava Mohini"	Satyam	Chi. Udayashankar	S. P. Balasubrahmanyam	
1984	Eradu Rekhegalu	"Neela Megha Shyama"	M. S. Vishwanathan	R. N. Jayagopal	Vani Jairam	
1984	Hennina Sowbhagya	"Aaseya Aleya Kadalalli"	Upendra Kumar	Chi. Udayashankar	P. B. Sreenivas	
1984	Indina Bharatha	"Ardha Rathri Swathantra"	Chakravarthy	Chi. Udayashankar	S. P. Balasubrahmanyam	
1984	Kanoonige Savaal	"Pappa Mummy Endu Nanna"	Kalyan-Venkatesh	Vijaya Narasimha	S. P. Balasubrahmanyam	
1984	Khaidi	"Endo Kanda Nenapu"	Chakravarthy	Chi. Udayashankar	S. P. Balasubrahmanyam	
1984	Khaidi	"Surasundari Menakeyo"	Chakravarthy	Chi. Udayashankar	S. P. Balasubrahmanyam	
1984	Khaidi	"Thale Hoova Edeyinda"	Chakravarthy	Chi. Udayashankar	S. P. Balasubrahmanyam	
1984	Nagara Mahime	"Kaanadaade Jyothiya"	Ilaiyaraaja	Chi. Udayashankar		
1984	Police Papanna	"Police Topi Haakondu"	J. V. Raghavulu	R. N. Jayagopal		
1984	Police Papanna	"Pete Beediya Puttaswamy"	J. V. Raghavulu	R. N. Jayagopal		
1984	Pooja Phala	"Naagara Haave"	Satyam	Panje Mangesh Rao		
1984	Shapatha	"Kanda Baa Kanda Baa"	Shankar Ganesh	Chi. Udayashankar		
1984	Shiva Kanye	"Nambide Ninna"	T. G. Lingappa	Hunsur Krishnamurthy		
1984	Sidilu	"Hoo Annu Ashte Saaku"	Satyam	Chi. Udayashankar	S. P. Balasubrahmanyam	
1984	Sidilu	"Akka Ninna Pakka"	Satyam	Chi. Udayashankar	S. P. Balasubrahmanyam	
1984	Sidilu	"Elli Ramano Alli Seetheyu"	Satyam	Chi. Udayashankar	S. P. Balasubrahmanyam	
1984	Thaliya Bhagya	"Kumkuma Shubhava"	Satyam	Chi. Udayashankar		
1984	Vighneshwarana Vahana	"Vighneshawaranu"	Satyam	Chi. Udayashankar	S. Janaki, S. P. Sailaja	
1984	Nillada Alegalu	"Swagatha Koruva"	Ramesh Naidu	R. N. Jayagopal	S. P. Balasubrahmanyam	
1984	Nillada Alegalu	"Hunnime Kannali"	Ramesh Naidu	R. N. Jayagopal		
1984	Sneha Sangeetha	"Baa Bandeya Rasika"	V. Kumar	K. R. Ramachandra Prabhu		
1985	Amara Jyothi	"Innu Innu Nodo Aase"	Satyam	Chi. Udayashankar	S. P. Balasubrahmanyam	
1985	Amara Jyothi	"Sanjeya Rangu Bandide"	Satyam	Chi. Udayashankar	S. P. Balasubrahmanyam	
1985	Bhayankara Bhasmasura	"Aalalende Hennagi Bande"	M. Ranga Rao	Vijaya Narasimha	S. Janaki	
1985	Devara Mane	"Maiyyige Shaane"	K. J. Joy	Doddarange Gowda	S. P. Balasubrahmanyam	
1985	Devarelliddane	"Nanna Chinna"	S. P. Balasubrahmanyam	Chi. Udayashankar	Vani Jairam	
1985	Goonda Guru	"Ee Maneya Deepavu"	M. Ranga Rao	R. N. Jayagopal	S. P. Balasubrahmanyam	
1985	Kartavya	"Bhoomiye Helide"	Satyam	Chi. Udayashankar	S. P. Balasubrahmanyam	
1985	Kartavya	"Jhana Jhana Jhana"	Satyam	Chi. Udayashankar	S. P. Balasubrahmanyam	
1985	Kartavya	"Ammammma Rathriyalli"	Satyam	Chi. Udayashankar	Vani Jairam	
1985	Kiladi Aliya	"Bhagyada Lakshmiyu"	Satyam	R. N. Jayagopal		
1985	Mamatheya Madilu	"Ede Baditha"	M. S. Viswanathan	R. N. Jayagopal		
1985	Manava Danava	"Good Morning Shubhadina"	Ramesh Naidu	R. N. Jayagopal	S. P. Balasubrahmanyam	
1985	Mugila Mallige	"Prathidina Hosa"	V S Narasimhan	R. N. Jayagopal		
1985	Mugila Mallige	"Oppide Kannu"	V S Narasimhan	R. N. Jayagopal	P. Jayachandran	
1985	Mugila Mallige	"Saaku Saaku Hoge"	V S Narasimhan	R. N. Jayagopal	Vani Jairam	
1985	Nanna Prathigne	"Premigalu Endu"	Satyam	Chi. Udayashankar	Rajkumar Bharathi	
1985	Nanna Prathigne	"Naa Kotte Endare"	Satyam	Chi. Udayashankar	S. P. Balasubrahmanyam	
1985	Pralaya Rudra	"Hey Malish Hey Polish"	Satyam	R. N. Jayagopal	Vani Jairam	
1985	Pralaya Rudra	"Nannonu Manasa Kaddonu"	Satyam	Chi. Udayashankar	Vani Jairam	
1985	Pralaya Rudra	"Oh Sogasada Sanje"	Satyam	Chi. Udayashankar	Raj Seetharam	
1985	Sati Sakkubai	"Hey Krishna Ninna"	Satyam	Chi. Udayashankar		
1985	Shiva Kotta Sowbhagya	"Yara Kopa Yara Shaapa"	T. G. Lingappa	Hunsur Krishnamurthy		
1985	Thayi Kanasu	"Idu Thayiya Kanasu"	Satyam	Chi. Udayashankar	S. P. Balasubrahmanyam	
1985	Thayi Kanasu	"Devaru Ello"	Satyam	Chi. Udayashankar	Chayadevi	
1985	Thayi Thande	"Moda Maleya"	T. Chalapathi Rao	Chi. Udayashankar	S. P. Balasubrahmanyam	
1985	Thayi Thande	"Maduve Maduve"	T. Chalapathi Rao	Chi. Udayashankar	Raj Seetharam	
1985	Thayiya Hone	"Mugila Malligeyo"	Satyam	Chi. Udayashankar	Rajkumar Bharathi	
1985	Thayiya Hone	"Naada Charithe Nenapisuva"	Satyam	C. V. Shivashankar	Bangalore Latha, B. R. Chaya	
1985	Thulasidala	"Namma Muddu Maguvu"	Upendra Kumar	Chi. Udayashankar	P. Jayachandran	
1986	Beegara Pandya	"Phalasa Bhimphalasa"	Ramesh Naidu	R. N. Jayagopal	S. P. Balasubrahmanyam	
1986	Beegara Pandya	"Nannede Maathu"	Ramesh Naidu	R. N. Jayagopal	S. P. Balasubrahmanyam	
1986	Beegara Pandya	"Manasu Hela Bayaside"	Ramesh Naidu	R. N. Jayagopal		
1986	Bhagyada Lakshmi Baramma	"Innu Hatthira Hatthira"	Singeetham Srinivasa Rao	Chi. Udayashankar	Dr. Rajkumar	
1986	Kathanayaka	"Maralide Goodige"	M. Ranga Rao	R. N. Jayagopal		
1986	Sundara Swapnagalu	"Hrudayavu Swara Haadide"	Vijaya Bhaskar	R. N. Jayagopal	Vani Jairam	
1986	Thayiye Nanna Devaru	"Yaavudu Nyayavu"	Satyam	Chi. Udayashankar	S. P. Balasubrahmanyam	
1986	Tiger	"Hondaariye Nage"	Sankar Ganesh	Chi. Udayashankar	S. P. Balasubrahmanyam	
1987	Aaganthuka	"Santhoshada Dina"	Rajiv Taranath	M. N. Vyasa Rao		
1987	Aase	"Anuraaga Lokadalli"	Ravi Shenoy	Doddarange Gowda	S. P. Balasubrahmanyam	
1987	Aase	"Aasegala Aleyalli"	Ravi Shenoy	Hamsalekha	S. P. Balasubrahmanyam	
1987	Athiratha Maharatha	"Haaduve Naa Haaduve"	Chakravarthy	R. N. Jayagopal		
1987	Athiratha Maharatha	"Maagiya Kaalada"	Chakravarthy	R. N. Jayagopal	S. P. Balasubrahmanyam	
1987	Bhadrakali	"Jodi Jeevavu"	Satyam	Vijaya Narasimha		
1987	Hrudaya Pallavi	"Nee Baro Dariyali"	M. Ranga Rao	R. N. Jayagopal		
1987	Olavina Udugore	"Olavina Udugore Kodalenu"	M. Ranga Rao	R. N. Jayagopal	P. Jayachandran	
1987	Shivabhakta Markandeya	Shivanu Banda"	M. Ranga Rao	Chi. Udayashankar		
1987	Sri Chamundeshwari Pooja Mahime	"Jayavu Namade"	Vijaya Krishnamurthy	Sorat Ashwath		
1987	Thayi	"Arishina Kumkuma"	Satyam	R. N. Jayagopal	Vani Jairam	
1987	Thayi	"Jo Achuthananda"	Satyam	R. N. Jayagopal	Vani Jairam	
1987	Mamatheya Gudi	"Chandakki Mamana"	Charu Chandra	Vijaya Narasimha	P. B. Sreenivas	
1987	Kuthuhala	"Ninna Roopa Mechhutha"	Guna Singh	Doddarange Gowda	P. Jayachandran	
1987	Kuthuhala	"Needu Inde"	Guna Singh	Doddarange Gowda	P. Jayachandran	
1988	Dharma Patni	"Manninalli Gombe"	Hamsalekha	Vijaya Narasimha		
1988	Kankana Bhagya	"Ninne Monne"	Krishna-Chakra	R. N. Jayagopal	Mano	
1988	Kankana Bhagya	"Kanne Manasu"	Krishna-Chakra	R. N. Jayagopal		
1988	Kankana Bhagya	"O Rathriye"	Krishna-Chakra	R. N. Jayagopal		
1988	Kankana Bhagya	"Idu Yaava Haadu"	Krishna-Chakra	R. N. Jayagopal		
1988	Kankana Bhagya	"O Daanavanaada"	Krishna-Chakra	R. N. Jayagopal		
1988	Nava Bharatha	"Suryanu Maadida"	Chakravarthy	Doddarange Gowda		
1988	Ranadheera	"Ondanondu Kaaladalli"	Hamsalekha	Hamsalekha	Ramesh	
1988	Sahasa Veera	"Naane Raaja"	Satyam	Chi. Udayashankar	Mano	
1988	Sahasa Veera	"Hrudaya Haadide"	Satyam	R. N. Jayagopal	Mano	
1988	Thayi Karulu	"Sri Sathyanarayanane"	Satyam	Vijaya Narasimha		
1988	Thayi Karulu	"Hayagi Nalinalidadi"	Satyam	Vijaya Narasimha	Ramakrishna	
1988	Thayi Karulu	"Katthalu Thumbitu"	Satyam	Vijaya Narasimha		
1988	Thayiya Aase	"Sri Rama Jayarama"	Vijaya Bhaskar	Chi. Udayashankar	Rajkumar Bharathi	
1989	Gandandre Gandu	"Anna Thammore"	G. K. Venkatesh	R. N. Jayagopal	Sulochana, Rajkumar Bharathi	
1989	Gandandre Gandu	"Manjina Hanigalu"	G. K. Venkatesh	R. N. Jayagopal		

=== 1990s -2000s ===
Year	Film	Song	Music director	Writer	Co-singer	Note(s)
1990	Agni Divya	"Prema Balige Swapna"	Shyam	R. N. Jayagopal	Rajkumar Bharathi	
1990	Maheshwara	"Eke Kopa Nannolave"	Vijay Anand	R. N. Jayagopal		
1991	Kala Chakra	"Prema Latheyu"	M. Ranga Rao	R. N. Jayagopal	S. P. Balasubrahmanyam	
1991	Kala Chakra	"Bhoothayi Malagayitu"	M. Ranga Rao	R. N. Jayagopal		
1993	Bhagawan Sri Saibaba	"Vinayaka Ninna Paadake"	Upendra Kumar	R. N. Jayagopal		
1993	Bhagawan Sri Saibaba	"Deepavali Jyothi"	Upendra Kumar	R. N. Jayagopal	S. P. Balasubrahmanyam, B. R. Chaya, Sangeetha Katti	
2006	Savira Mettilu	"Nammoora Bettada"	Vijaya Bhaskar	P. V. Nanjaraja Urs	P. B. Sreenivas	Delayed release

== Hindi songs ==
Year	Film	Song	Composer(s)	Writer(s)	Co-artist(s)
1973	Paandav Banvaas	"Piya Jag Ke Maharaja"	Ghantasala, J. V. Raghavulu	Saraswati Kumar Deepak	vani Jairam
1973	Sampoorna Ramayan	"Kyun Jal Ki Urmi, Urmi Machal Rahi Hai"	K. V. Mahadevan	B. R. Tripathi	solo
1973	Sampoorna Ramayan	"Kaun Hai Tumse Mahaan"	K. V. Mahadevan	B. R. Tripathi	Vani Jairam
1974	Lav Kush	"Suno Re, Suno Re, Ramayan Gatha"	Ghantasala, J. V. Raghavulu	Bharat Vyas	Vani Jairam
1974	Lav Kush	"Aasun Kyun Girayo"	Ghantasala, J. V. Raghavulu	Bharat Vyas	Vani Jairam
1974	Lav Kush	"Jai Jai Ram, Jai Jai Ram"	Ghantasala, J. V. Raghavulu	Bharat Vyas	Vani Jairam
1974	Lav Kush	"Shri Ram Ka Charit Maha Anupam Hai"	Ghantasala, J. V. Raghavulu	Bharat Vyas	Vani Jairam
1974	Lav Kush	"Sab Mil Ke Ram Bolo"	Ghantasala, J. V. Raghavulu	Bharat Vyas	Vani Jairam
1974	Lav Kush	"Ram Katha Suno Bhai"	Ghantasala, J. V. Raghavulu	Bharat Vyas	Vani Jairam
1974	Lav Kush	"Jai Jai Ram, Jug Abhiram"	Ghantasala, J. V. Raghavulu	Bharat Vyas	Vani Jairam, P. B. Sreenivas
1979	Mata Velankanni	"Karunamay Hai Meri Maa"	G. Devarajan	Sameer (III)	solo
1979	Mata Velankanni	"Sagar Ki Rani Tu Velankanni" (version 2)	G. Devarajan	Sameer (III)	solo
1979	Mata Velankanni	"Neele Ambar Ke Chhaon Tale"	G. Devarajan	Sameer (III)	K. J. Yesudas
1979	Mata Velankanni	"Pyaar Mein Hum Magan Re"	G. Devarajan	Sameer (III)	K. J. Yesudas
1984	Ovide Thudangunnu	"Nee Ente Jeevaananomale"	Johnson	Poovachal Khader	Mohan Sharma
1986	Singhasan	"Tere Liye Maine Janam Liya"	Bappi Lahari	Indeevar	Kishore Kumar
1986	Singhasan	"Takatu Taka Tai"	Bappi Lahari	Indeevar	Kishore Kumar
1987	Veer Eklavya	"Tum Ho Mere Devta"	K. V. Mahadevan	Madhukar Rajasthani	solo
1987	Veer Eklavya	"Yeh Bhina Bhina Mausam"	K. V. Mahadevan	Madhukar Rajasthani	Raja Ravi Kumar
1988	Maut Ki Ladai	"Mast Hai Mast Hai Pyaar Ang Mein"	Laxmi Kiran	B. R. Tripathi	Vani Jairam
