= List of Kannada films of 1970 =

== Top-grossing films ==
Rank	Title	Collection	Ref.
1.	Sri Krishnadevaraya	₹1 crore (₹50 crore in 2025)	

== List ==
The following is a list of films produced in the Kannada film industry in India in 1970, presented in alphabetical order.

Title	Director	Cast	Music
Aaru Mooru Ombhatthu	K. S. L. Swamy	Udaya Kumar, Srinath, Leelavathi, B. V. Radha, R. N. Sudarshan	Vijaya Bhaskar
Anireekshita	B. Nagesh Babu	Srinath, Kalpana, K. S. Ashwath, B. V. Radha	Vijaya Bhaskar
Aparaajithe	R. M. Veerabadriah	Kalyan Kumar, Leelavathi, Mynavathi, Pandari Bai, K. S. Ashwath	Rajan–Nagendra
Arishina Kumkuma	K. S. L. Swamy	Kalyan Kumar, Rajesh, Kalpana, Dwarakish	Vijaya Bhaskar
Baalu Belagithu	Siddalingaiah	Rajkumar, Jayanthi, Bharathi, Dwarakish	Vijaya Bhaskar
Bhale Jodi	Y. R. Swamy	Rajkumar, Bharathi, Balakrishna, Pandari Bai, B. V. Radha	R. Ratna
Bhale Kiladi	S. Nagaraj	Srinath, Udaya Chandrika, Balakrishna, Dikki Madhava Rao	Satyam
Bhoopathi Ranga	Geethapriya	Rajkumar, Udaya Chandrika, Narasimharaju	Vijaya Bhaskar
Boregowda Bangalorige Banda	B. A. Arasu	Rajesh, Leelavathi, Vandana, Srinath	Rajan–Nagendra
C.I.D. Rajanna	R. Ramamurthy	Rajkumar, Rajasree, Balakrishna	Satyam
Devara Makkalu	Y. R. Swamy	Rajkumar, Rajesh, Kalpana	G. K. Venkatesh
Gejje Pooje	Puttanna Kanagal	Kalpana, Pandari Bai, K. S. Ashwath, Gangadhar, Leelavathi	Vijaya Bhaskar
Hasiru Thorana	T. V. Singh Rathore	Rajkumar, Udaya Kumar, Bharathi, Narasimharaju	Upendra Kumar
Kallara Kalla	M. P. Shankar	Udaya Kumar, R. N. Sudarshan, Aarathi	Satyam
Kanneeru	B. M. Sankar	Jayanthi, B. M. Venkatesh, Dinesh	Rajan–Nagendra
Karulina Kare	Puttanna Kanagal	Rajkumar, Kalpana, R. N. Sudarshan, Dinesh	M. Ranga Rao
Lakshmi Saraswathi	K. S. L. Swamy	B. Saroja Devi, B. V. Radha, R. N. Sudarshan	Vijaya Bhaskar
Modala Raatri	Vijay	Narasimharaju, Srinath, Rajasree	Satyam
Mooru Mutthugalu	Aarooru Pattabhi	Srinath, Rajesh, Pandari Bai, B. V. Radha, Mynavathi	Rajan–Nagendra
Mr. Rajkumar	B. S. Ranga	Rajkumar, Rajasree, Dinesh	B. N. Haridas
Mrutyu Panjaradalli Goodachari 555	Sunanda	Udaya Kumar, Srinath, Udaya Chandrika	Satyam
Nadina Bhagya	R. Nagendra Rao	Rajkumar, R. N. Sudarshan, Srilalitha, Surekha	R. Ratna
Namma Mane	Bangaara Raju	Rajesh, Kalpana, Dinesh	Upendra Kumar
Nanna Thamma	K. Babu Rao	Rajkumar, Gangadhar, Jayanthi, Balakrishna	Ghantasala
Paropakari	Y. R. Swamy	Rajkumar, Jayanthi, Sampath	Upendra Kumar
Pratheekara	M. S. Gopinath	Udaya Kumar, Kalpana, K. S. Ashwath	Satyam
Rangamahal Rahasya	Vijay	Srinath, Bharathi, Narasimharaju	Satyam
Samskara	Pattabhi Rama Reddy	Girish Karnad, P. Lankesh, Lakshmi Krishnamurthy, Snehalata Reddy	Rajeev Taranath
Sedige Sedu	A. V. Sheshagiri Rao	Udaya Kumar, Jayanthi, Balakrishna	Satyam
Seetha	Vadiraj	Gangadhar, Kalpana, Srinath, Ramesh	Vijaya Bhaskar
Sri Krishnadevaraya	B. R. Panthulu	Rajkumar, Bharathi, Jayanthi, B. R. Panthulu, M. V. Rajamma	T. G. Lingappa
Sukha Samsaara	Vijaya Satyam	Srinath, Udaya Kumar, Rajasree	M. Ranga Rao
Takka Bitre Sikka	A. M. Sameeulla	Srinath, Udaya Kumar, Aarathi	Vijaya Bhaskar
Vaagdaana	Shankar V	R. N. Sudarshan, Kalpana, Dwarakish	Velur Krishna

== See also ==
- Kannada films of 1960
- Kannada films of 1971
