= List of Kannada films of 1971 =

== Top-grossing films ==
Rank	Title	Collection	Ref.
1.	Kasturi Nivasa	₹2 crore (₹103.68 crore in 2025)	
2.	Kula Gourava	₹1.5 crore (₹76.02 crore in 2025)	
3.	Sharapanjara	₹1 crore (₹51.84 crore in 2024)	

== List ==
The following is a list of films produced in the Kannada film industry in India in 1971, presented in alphabetical order.

Title	Director	Cast	Music
Aadi Manava	G. K. Murthy	Prabhakar, Halum	
Aidu Beralu	S. R. Raajan	S. R. Raajan, Renuka, Indrani	R. Ratna
Aliya Geleya	B. R. Panthulu	Gangadhar, Bharathi, Mynavathi, Narasimharaju	T. G. Lingappa
Amarabharati	B. Krishna	Kalyan Kumar, Chandrakala, B. V. Radha	M. Purnachandra Rao
Anugraha	H. L. N. Simha	Srinath, K. S. Ashwath, Aarathi	Rajan–Nagendra
Baala Bandana	Peketi Sivaram	Rajkumar, Jayanthi, Sampath	G. K. Venkatesh
Bhale Adrushtavo Adrushta	K. S. L. Swamy	Gangadhar, Kalpana, Srinath, B. V. Radhas	Vijaya Bhaskar
Bhale Bhaskar	R. Ramamurthy	Udaya Kumar, Gangadhar, Anitha, Rajesh, Jayakumari	Satyam
Bhethala Gudda	B. A. Arasu	Rajesh, Udaya Chandrika, Dwarakish	Vijaya Bhaskar
Hennu Honnu Mannu	Basavaraj Kestur	Rajesh, Udaya Chandrika, M. P. Shankar, Thoogudeepa Srinivas	Upendra Kumar
Hoo Bisilu	T. V. Singh Thakur	Ramesh, Jayanthi, Rajashankar	T. G. Lingappa
Jatakaratna Gundaajoisa	B. Padmanabhan	H. R. Hanumantha Rao, B. Ramadevi, Narasimharaju	S. P. Kodandapani
Kasidre Kailasa	K. Janakiram	Rajkumar, Vanishree, Udaya Kumar, Pandari Bai	Satyam
Kalyani	Geethapriya	Jayanthi, Gangadhar, Ranga	Vijaya Bhaskar
Kasturi Nivasa	Dorai-Bhagavan	Rajkumar, Jayanthi, Aarathi, K. S. Ashwath, Narasimharaju, Balakrishna	G. K. Venkatesh
Kula Gourava	Peketi Sivaram	Rajkumar, Jayanthi, Bharathi	T. G. Lingappa
Malati Madhava	B. R. Panthulu	B. R. Panthulu, Gangadhar, Jayanthi	T. G. Lingappa
Mukthi	N. Lakshminarayana	Kalpana, Rajashekar, K. S. Ashwath	Vijaya Bhaskar
Naguva Hoovu	R. N. K. Prasad	R. N. Sudarshan, Shylashri, B. V. Radha, Ranga	G. K. Venkatesh
Namma Samsara	Siddalingaiah	Rajkumar, Balakrishna, Bharathi, Rajashankar	M. Ranga Rao
Namma Baduku	M. N. Aaradya	Rajesh, K. S. Ashwath, Balakrishna, Pandari Bai, Poornima	M. Ranga Rao
Nyayave Devaru	Siddalingaiah	Rajkumar, B. Saroja Devi, Aarathi	Rajan–Nagendra
Onde Kula Onde Daiva	D. Shankar	Rajesh, Srinath, Kalpana	Rajan–Nagendra
Paapa Punya	M. V. Krishnaswamy	Kalyan Kumar, K. S. Ashwath, B. Saroja Devi	Padmacharan
Poornima	R. Dayananda	B. Saroja Devi, Udaya Kumar, Rajesh	R. Ratna
Pratidwani	Dorai-Bhagavan	Rajkumar, Aarati, Rajesh	G. K. Venkatesh
Sakshatkara	Puttanna Kanagal	Rajkumar, Jamuna, Prithviraj Kapoor, Vajramuni	M. Ranga Rao
Sedina Kidi	B. Krishan	Kalyan Kumar, Rajashankar, Jayanthi	M. Purnachandra Rao
Samshaya Phala	A. M. Samiulla	Udaya Kumar, Jayanthi, Srinath	Salil Chowdhary
Sharapanjara	Puttanna Kanagal	Kalpana, Gangadhar, Lokanath, Chindodi Leela, Leelavathi, K. S. Ashwath, Shivaram	Vijaya Bhaskar
Sidila Mari	B. S. Ranga	Udaya Kumar, Jayanthi, K. S. Ashwath, Dwarakish	S. Rajeswara Rao
Signalman Sidappa	Tekkatte	Udaya Kumar, Leelavathi, Balakrishna	Vijaya Bhaskar
Sothu Geddavalu	S. K. A. Chari	Kalpana, Gangadhar, Balakrishna	M. Ranga Rao
Sri Krishna Rukmini Satyabhama	K. S. L. Swamy	Rajkumar, B. Saroja Devi, Aarathi	R. Sudarsanam
Thayi Devaru	Siddalingaiah	Rajkumar, M. V. Rajamma, Bharathi, K. S. Ashwath	G. K. Venkatesh
Tande Makkalu	Srikanth	Jayanthi, B. Sarojadevi, Srinath	G. K. Venkatesh

== See also ==
- Kannada films of 1970
- Kannada films of 1972
