= Bhale Adrushtavo Adrushta =

- Directed by: K. S. L. Swamy
- Written by: Valampuri Somanathan
- Screenplay by: Valampuri Somanathan
- Starring: Kalpana; Gangadhar; Srinath; B. V. Radha; K. S. Ashwath
- Cinematography: R. N. K. Prasad
- Edited by: Bal G. Yadav
- Music by: Vijaya Bhaskar
- Production company: Raghunandan Movies
- Release date: 1971
- Running time: 141 minutes
- Country: India
- Language: Kannada

Bhale Adrushtavo Adrushta is a 1971 Indian Kannada-language comedy drama film, directed by K. S. L. Swamy. The film stars Kalpana, B. V. Radha, Gangadhar, Srinath and K. S. Ashwath. The film has musical score by Vijaya Bhaskar. This film is known to be the first film in South India to be shot and released in ORWO Color.

== Plot ==
Malini, the daughter of wealthy plantation owner Rao Bahadur Sundareshwar of Madikeri, studies in Mangalore and secretly sponsors the education of Kamala, the daughter of a poor family. Although Kamala accompanies Malini to college, she is officially employed as her caretaker and maid. Sundareshwar, a wealthy landowner and racehorse enthusiast with strong feudal attitudes, disapproves of social equality, and holds class prejudices. Meanwhile, Malini falls in love with novelist Aravind after becoming an admirer of his writings. When Sundareshwar visits Mangalore, Malini introduces her friend Kalpana to him while concealing that Kalpana and Kamala are the same person.

At the same time, Sundareshwar's nephew Krishna returns from Switzerland after completing his education. Impressed by Kalpana's supposed background, Sundareshwar chooses her as Krishna's bride. Eager to escape poverty and marry into an affluent family, Kamala continues the deception. She requests that Malini's wedding also take place on the same day. Although Sundareshwar initially opposes Malini's desire to marry Aravind because of his profession as a writer and the fact that he is the son of his estranged sister, whom the family had earlier ostracized for marrying against their wishes, he reluctantly agrees after Krishna's father and his older brother Nani's urging. To sustain Kamala's false identity, Malini hires shehnai player Ananthaiah, his wife Sakku, and their son Nanjundi to impersonate Kalpana's wealthy parents during the wedding ceremonies. Both couples are subsequently married.

After the weddings, Kamala's real parents and a suitor named Srikanthaiah arrive at Sundareshwar's residence in search of her. Fearing exposure, Malini falsely claims that Kamala is working as a maid in Goa. When her parents later encounter her in Mysore, Kamala denies knowing them, leaving them heartbroken and herself consumed by guilt. Later, Nanjundi demands money from Kamala to purchase a car and threatens to reveal her true identity. Although Malini dismisses him as mentally unstable, the incident further troubles Kamala.

Matters come to a head when Ananthaiah travels to Bangalore to collect lottery winnings on behalf of villagers and discovers that Kamala too has claimed a prize, under her real name. After his demand for more money is rejected, he arrives at Sundareshwar's house with evidence and police officers, accusing Kamala of impersonation. Faced with undeniable proof, Kamala confesses her true identity. During the ensuing confrontation, the jealous Srikanthaiah throws a knife at Krishna, but Kamala intervenes and is injured while protecting her husband. She survives the attack, and her sacrifice transforms Sundareshwar's outlook. Recognizing her character and devotion, he abandons his long-held prejudices and accepts that virtue matters more than wealth or social status.

== Cast ==
- Kalpana as Kamala
- B. V. Radha as Malini
- Gangadhar as Krishna
- Srinath as Aravind
- K. S. Ashwath as Rao Bahadur Sundareshwar
- Sampath as Nani
- T. N. Balakrishna as Ananthaiah
- Dwarakish as Nanjundi
- Thoogudeepa Srinivas as Srikanthaiah
- Manjunath
- C. L. Narayana Rao
- Thimmayya as Sub-inspector
- M. N. Lakshmi Devi as Sakku
- Advani Lakshmi Devi as Gowri, Nani's wife
- R. T. Rama as Kamala's friend
- B. Jaya as Jaya, Kamala's friend
- M. Jayashree as Aravind's mother
- B. Ramadevi as English professor
- Chi. Udayashankar as performer in Mysore Dasara
- Shivaram as performer in Mysore Dasara
- Ragini
- Ramesh in a special appearance as doctor

== Soundtrack ==
The music was composed by Vijaya Bhaskar.

No.	Song	Singers	Lyrics	Length (m:ss)
1	"Ee Maithri Apoorva Maithri"	P. B. Sreenivas	R. N. Jayagopal	03:20
2	"Navu Haaduvude"	P. B. Sreenivas, A. L. Ragavan	Chi. Udaya Shankar	03:33
3	"Balegaara Chenniaiah"	P. B. Sreenivas	R. N. Jayagopal	03:05
4	"Daaha Daaha"	K. J. Yesudas	R. N. Jayagopal	03:36
5	"Kalpana Roopa Rasi"	P. B. Sreenivas	K. S. L. Swamy	03:27
6	"Kandu Kandu Nee Enna"	S. Janaki	Purandaradasa	03:51
7	"Kannadathi O Gelathi"	P. B. Sreenivas, L. R. Eswari	K. S. L. Swamy	03:23
