= Makkala Bhagya =

- Directed by: K. S. L. Swamy (Ravi)
- Written by: Javar Seetharaman
- Produced by: K. Vittal Kumar; K. V. Honnappa
- Starring: Vishnuvardhan; Bharathi Vishnuvardhan; K. S. Ashwath; Dwarakish
- Cinematography: B. Purushottham
- Edited by: Bal G. Yadav; N. M. Victor
- Music by: Vijaya Bhaskar
- Production company: Vittal Movies
- Release date: 9 February 1976
- Running time: 172 Min.
- Country: India
- Language: Kannada

Makkala Bhagya ( transl. Luck of children) is a 1976 Indian Kannada-language film, directed by K. S. L. Swamy (Ravi) and produced by K. Vittal Kumar and K. V. Honnappa. The film stars Vishnuvardhan, Bharathi Vishnuvardhan, K. S. Ashwath and Dwarakish in the lead roles. The film has musical score by Vijaya Bhaskar. It is a remake of the Tamil movie Kuzhandaiyum Deivamum, which itself was an adaptation of the 1953 British film Twice Upon a Time and the 1961 movie The Parent Trap – both based on the Erich Kästner's 1949 German novel Lottie and Lisa (Das doppelte Lottchen).

This was the first film to be released at Sampige theatre, Bangalore.

== Cast ==
- Vishnuvardhan as Chandrashekhar
- Bharathi Vishnuvardhan as Sathybhama
- B. V. Radha as Nirmala, dance teacher
- K. S. Ashwath as Bhama's father
- Leelavathi (actress) as Kamala, Bhama's mother
- Gangadhar in Guest Appearance as Nandini's husband
- Udaya Chandrika in Guest Appearance as Nandini
- Dwarakish as Sundara
- Shubha in Guest Appearance as School teacher
- Sampath
- Thoogudeepa Srinivas as Jambhavantha
- Chethan Ramarao
- Mysuru Lokesh
- M. N. Lakshmidevi Mirmala's mother
- B. Jaya as Pankaja
- B. Hanumanthachar in Guest Appearance
- Baby Indira in dual role as Sheela and Leela

== Soundtrack ==
- "O Gelati Nannane" - S. B. Balasubrahmanyam, Vani Jairam
- "Amma Ondu Maneyalli" - L. R. Anjali
