= Karnataka State Film Award for Fourth Best Film =

Indian film award

- State award for contributions to Kannada cinema
- Sponsored by: Government of Karnataka
- First award: 1972/73
- Final award: 1976/77
- Most recent winner: Ruthugaana

Highlights
- Total awarded: 3
- First winner: Hrudaya Sangama

The Karnataka State Film Award for Fourth Best Film was one of the Karnataka State Film Awards awarded for Kannada films. It was first awarded for films made in 1972–73 and last for those made in 1976–77.

== Winners ==
Year	Film	Producer(s)	Director(s)	Refs.
1972–73	Hrudaya Sangama	H. N. Muddukrishna	Rashi Brothers	
1975–76	Katha Sangama	C. S. Raja	Puttanna Kanagal	
1976–77	Ruthugaana		Vijaykumar	
