= Sarada (1973 film) =

- Film poster
- Directed by: K. Viswanath
- Produced by: Kranthi Kumar
- Starring: Sharada; Sobhan Babu; Kaikala Satyanarayana; Jayanthi; Rao Gopal Rao
- Cinematography: V. K. Gopal; G. K. Ramu
- Music by: K. Chakravarthy
- Release date: 4 May 1973
- Running time: 166 minutes
- Country: India
- Language: Telugu

Sarada (Telugu: శారద) is a 1973 Telugu drama film starring Sarada and directed by K. Viswanath. The film is a remake of the 1972 Kannada movie Yaava Janmada Maitri which was also remade in Tamil as Radha (1973) and in Hindi as Dulhan (1975).

== Plot ==
A psychiatrist visits a small village for a friend's marriage. Everyone thinks they have seen a ghost. The doctor soon finds out the reason. Sarada is an innocent village woman who likes everyone in the village and everyone in the village likes her. A doctor working in the village loves her. They marry after convincing her brother and village elders. On the day of their wedding, the doctor goes to attend an emergency patient. The boat taking him capsizes in the river Godavari and he dies. Sarada loses her sanity and forgets everything. Her brother and other villagers act as if her husband has gone missing and would return soon. Sarada believes the psychiatrist to be her missing husband. The psychiatrist was told her miserable story by the village elders. He find that the only way he can help her regain her sanity is by playing along with her madness and act as her husband. The psychiatrist brings them to the town and treats them. His wife realises the situation and cooperates with him. Finally after some time, she learns the truth and asks everyone to excuse her for troubling them. Sarada and her brother decide to return to the village. She dies in the hands of her brother while crossing the river.

== Cast ==
- Sharada... Insane Woman
- Sobhan Babu... Husband / Doctor
- Jayanti... Doctor's wife
- Kaikala Satyanarayana... Brother of Sarada
- Rao Gopal Rao
- Allu Ramalingaiah
- Rajababu
- Baby Dolly
- Shanta Devi

== Soundtrack ==
- "Ato Ito Telipovali" (Singers: Chakravarti and Rama Rao)
- "Kanne Vadhuvuga Maredi Jeevitamlo Okesari" (Singers: Ghantasala and P. Susheela; Cast: Sobhan Babu and Sarada )
- "Naa Gudilo Gantalu Mroginavi" (Singer: P. Susheela; Cast: Sarada)
- "Radhalola Gopala Ganavilola Yadupala" (Singer: P. Susheela; Cast: Sarada)
- "Sarada, Nanu Cheraga Emitamma Sigga" (Lyrics: C. Narayana Reddy; Singer: V. Ramakrishna; Cast: Sobhan Babu and Sarada)
- "Shrimatigariki Teeranivela Shrivarikenduku Eegola" (Singers: V. Ramakrishna and P. Susheela; Cast: Sobhan Babu and Jayanti)
- "Vrepalle Vechenu Venuvu Vechenu" (Lyrics: C. Narayana Reddy; Singer: P. Susheela; Cast: Sarada)

== Boxoffice ==
The film ran for more than 100 days in 5 centres in Andhra Pradesh i.e. Hyderabad, Guntur, Rajamundry, Kakinada and Nellore.

== Awards ==
- Nandi Award for Best Feature Film - Gold – Kranthi Kumar (1973)
