= Kalyani (1971 film) =

- Directed by: Geethapriya
- Screenplay by: Geethapriya
- Story by: Geethapriya
- Produced by: M.V Chandre Gowda, Channapatna
- Starring: Jayanthi; Gangadhar; K. S. Ashwath; Ranga; Vijayakala
- Cinematography: V. Manohar
- Edited by: Bal G. Yadav
- Music by: Vijaya Bhaskar
- Production company: Manjula Production Channapatna
- Distributed by: Eashwari
- Release date: 1971
- Running time: 142 minutes
- Country: India
- Language: Kannada

Kalyani is a 1971 Indian Kannada film, created under the banner " Manjula Production " Channapatna. It was directed by Geethapriya and produced by M. V. Chandre Gowda from Channapatna. The film stars Jayanthi, Gangadhar, Ranga and Vijayakala in the lead roles. The film has musical score by Vijaya Bhaskar.

== Cast ==
- Jayanthi
- Gangadhar
- Ranga
- Vijayakala
- K. S. Ashwath
- M. Jayashree

== Soundtrack ==
The music was composed by Vijaya Bhaskar.

No.	Song	Singers	Lyrics	Length (m:ss)
1	"Ondhe Ondhe"	Sudhakar, Anjali	Geethapriya	3:20
2	"Veena Ninagyeko"	B. K. Sumithra	Geethapriya	3:26
