= Malaya Marutha =

- DVD cover
- Directed by: K. S. L. Swamy (Lalitha Ravi)
- Written by: Chi. Udayashankar, Valampuri Somanathan
- Produced by: C. V. L. Shastry
- Starring: Dr.Vishnuvardhan; Saritha; Madhavi
- Cinematography: B. Purushottam; Gopinath
- Edited by: NM Victor, Bal G. Yadav
- Music by: Vijaya Bhaskar
- Production company: Shastry Movies
- Release date: 13 November 1986
- Country: India
- Language: Kannada

Malaya Marutha ( transl. Winds from the hills) is a 1986 Kannada-language musical film starring Vishnuvardhan, Saritha and Madhavi. The film was directed and written by K. S. L. Swamy (Lalitha Ravi) and produced by C. V. L Shastry under "Shastry Movies" production house. Vijaya Bhaskar has composed the soundtrack and the background score.

In the film, a music guru is killed in a road accident and his artistic soul migrates into Vishwa (Dr. Vishnuvardhan), an aspiring musician and turns him into a virtuoso. The film also explores his relationships with two women, Girija (Madhavi), a popular dancer and Sharada (Saritha), the guru's daughter.

The film was released on 13 November 1986 to widespread critical acclaim. The film was screened at the mainstream section at the 11th International Film Festival of India. The film won the Karnataka State Film Award for Best Male Playback Singer (K. J. Yesudas).

== Plot ==
A revivalist melodrama in which the artistic soul of a music guru, killed in a road accident, migrates into the aspiring, but hopeless, musician Vishwa, turning him into a virtuoso capable of realising the guru's dreams. Vishwa is torn between the guru's daughter Sharada and Girija, a popular dancer whose father exploits Vishwa's talent. Vishwa embarks on building a music college with Sharada's help. Girija donates all her money to the cause, but when Vishwa loses his voice, Sharada teaches him to regain it. Girija is reprimanded by her father for loving the married Vishwa and she contemplates suicide but survives. An interesting twist to the story is that Vishwa is the extension of Sharada's father. Though both Sharada and Girija are shown to be in love with Vishwa, he always sees Sharada in the form of her namesake Goddess Saraswati and only reciprocates the love of Girija. Eventually, Vishwa and Sharada decide to visit the Saraswati temple in Sringeri. There, Vishwa faints and has a vision of Goddess Saraswati giving his voice back. He actually starts singing again, relieving Sharada. Girija, weak and frail, runs all the way to meet Vishwa and Sharada in Kollur. Girija asks Vishwa's hand in marriage to which Sharada agrees by gifting her mangalsutra. In the end, Vishwa and Girija live a happy married life supported by Sharada.

== Cast ==
- Vishnuvardhan as Vishwa
- Saritha as Sharada
- Madhavi as Girija
- M. S. Umesh as Violinist
- Dinesh as Krishnappa - Girija's father
- Shivaram as Ugranarasimhaiyya
- Gode Lakshminarayan as Pashupati, Ghatam Player
- Jari Venkatram
- Ashwath Narayan Shastri as Venkannaiyya
- Pranava Murthy
- R K Surya Narayan as Vidvan Srikanthaiyya
- Kumari Veena Varuni
- Meese Krishna as Meese Subanna, Taxi driver
- Srishailan as Television channel head
- Pandit Bhimsen Joshi as himself

== Production ==
Balu Mahendra was initially offered to direct the film but he declined the offer.

== Soundtrack ==
Malaya Marutha

Soundtrack album by Vijaya Bhaskar
- Released: 1986
- Genre: Feature film soundtrack
- Length: 59:52
- Language: Kannada
- Label: MRT Music

Vijaya Bhaskar chronology
Sundara Swapnagalu (1986)	Malaya Marutha (1986)	Huli Hebbuli (1987)
External audio
- Malaya Marutha – Jukebox on YouTube

Soundtrack was composed by Vijaya Bhaskar.

Track listing
No.	Title	Lyrics	Singer(s)	Length
1.	"Ee Sneha Ninade"	R. N. Jayagopal	S. P. Balasubrahmanyam, Vani Jairam	4:38
2.	"Sakala Karyakaranage"	Vijaya Naarasimha	K. J. Yesudas	5:19
3.	"Sharade Daye Thoridhe"	Chi. Udayashankar	K. J. Yesudas	3:28
4.	"Asatoma Sadgamaya"	Chi. Udayashankar	Ravi	0:43
5.	"Yam Shaivassampupasathe"	Chi. Udayashankar	K. J. Yesudas	0:50
6.	"Srinivasa Enna Bittu"	Purandara Dasa	K. J. Yesudas	1:53
7.	"Natana Visharada"	Kanagal Prabhakar Shastry	K. J. Yesudas	4:49
8.	"Hindanagali Hidivadeda"	Akka Mahadevi	K. J. Yesudas, Vani Jairam	2:16
9.	"Madhurambam Bhajare"	Muthuswami Dikshitar	K. J. Yesudas	4:24
10.	"Ellaru Maduvudu"	Kanaka Dasa	K. J. Yesudas	2:57
11.	"Amma Ninna Nodidare"	Chi. Udayashankar	S. P. Balasubrahmanyam	4:30
12.	"Adharam Madhuram"	Vallabha Acharya	S. P. Balasubrahmanyam, Vani Jairam	6:02
13.	"Ellellu Sangeethave"	Chi. Udayashankar	K. J. Yesudas	4:56
14.	"Malaya Maruthagana"	Chi. Udayashankar	K. J. Yesudas, S. Janaki	8:23
15.	"Sangeetha Gnanamu"	Tyagaraja	K. J. Yesudas	1:17
16.	"Sharade Daye Thoridhe"	Chi. Udayashankar	S. P. Balasubrahmanyam	3:27
Total length:				59:52

== Awards ==
- K. J. Yesudas won Karnataka State Film Award for Best Male Playback Singer in 1986.
