= Dulhan (1975 film) =

- Poster
- Directed by: C. V. Rajendran
- Written by: Inder Raj Anand (dialogues)
- Screenplay by: C. V. Rajendran
- Story by: M. Seshagiri Rao
- Produced by: B Anand Valli
- Starring: Jeetendra; Hema Malini; Jamuna
- Cinematography: K.S. Prasad
- Edited by: B. Kandaswamy
- Music by: Laxmikant Pyarelal
- Production company: Sujatha International
- Release date: 18 October 1974
- Running time: 148 minutes
- Country: India
- Language: Hindi

Dulhan (transl. Bride) is a 1974 Indian Hindi-language drama film, produced by B. Anand Valli under the Sujatha International banner and directed by C. V. Rajendran. It stars Jeetendra, Hema Malini and Jamuna. The film is a remake of 1972 Kannada movie Yaava Janmada Maitri which was earlier remade in Telugu as Sarada (1973).

== Cast ==
- Jeetendra as Ashok and Vijay (dual role)
- Hema Malini as Radha
- Jamuna as Padma
- Ashok Kumar as Keshav
- Nazir Hussain as Munsib
- Mehmood as Raju
- Paintal
- Agha as Mamuji
- Manorama as Mamiji

== Soundtrack ==
#	Title	Singer(s)
1	"Jaan-E-Chaman Jaan-E-Bahaar"	Kishore Kumar
2	"Aayegi Zaroor Chitithi"	Lata Mangeshkar
3	"Main Dulhan Teri" v1	Lata Mangeshkar
4	"Govinda Gopaala Mere Rote"	Lata Mangeshkar
5	"Main Dulhan Teri" v2	Lata Mangeshkar
