= Jeevana Jokali =

- Directed by: Geethapriya
- Starring: Gangadhar; Bharathi; Suma; T. N. Balakrishna
- Cinematography: V. Manohar
- Music by: Vijaya Bhaskar
- Release date: 1972
- Country: India
- Language: Kannada

Jeevana Jokali is a 1972 Indian Kannada-language film, directed by Geethapriya. The film stars Gangadhar, Bharathi, Suma and T. N. Balakrishna.

== Cast ==
- Gangadhar
- Bharathi Vishnuvardhan
- Suma
- T. N. Balakrishna
- M. N. Lakshmi Devi

== Soundtrack ==
The music was composed by Vijaya Bhaskar.

No.	Song	Singers	Lyrics	Length (m:ss)
1	"Cheluva Baruthane"	P. Susheela	Geetha Priya	03:30
2	"Bhagyada Lakshmiyu"	P. Susheela	R. N. Jayagopal	04:52
3	"Kannallindu"	K. J. Yesudas	Chi. Udaya Shankar	04:40
