= Katha Sangama (1976 film) =

1975 film by Puttanna Kanagal

- DVD cover
- Directed by: Puttanna Kanagal
- Screenplay by: Puttanna Kanagal
- Story by: Giraddy Govindaraja; Veena; Eshwara Chandra
- Based on: Hangu by Giraddy Govindaraja Athithi by Veena Munithayi by Eshwara Chandra
- Produced by: C. S. Rajah
- Starring: G. K. Govinda Rao; Loknath; Kalyan Kumar; Saroja Devi; Aarathi; Gangadhar; Rajinikanth
- Cinematography: B. N. Haridas
- Edited by: V. P. Krishna
- Music by: Vijaya Bhaskar
- Distributed by: Vardhini Art Pictures
- Release date: 23 January 1976
- Running time: 132 minutes
- Country: India
- Language: Kannada

Katha Sangama ( transl. Confluence of tales) is a 1976 Indian Kannada-language anthology film, directed by Puttanna Kanagal. The film features three segments and stars G. K. Govinda Rao, Loknath, Kalyan Kumar, B. Saroja Devi, Aarathi, and Rajinikanth.

== Plot ==
=== Hangu ===
A poor university professor with high moral values and integrity who is offered a bribe from a wealthy contractor to push some grace marks to his son in his exam paper so that he could get enough percentage to qualify for a medical college. This happens just when the professor's young son is critically ill and requires expensive medical treatment. Whether the professor succumbs to the circumstances or he let go of his integrity forms the crux of the story.

=== Atithi ===
When a middle-aged woman Leelavathi, who is the warden of a girls hostel, was younger she had refused to marry Sadanand, who loved her, because of her ideals about feminism. She had even decided to stay unmarried her entire life. A chance encounter with Sadanand, now happily married to someone else, makes her question her earlier decision of not accepting true love.

=== Munithaayi ===
A revenue inspector Chennappa marries a blind girl, Munithayi, who is from the neighbouring district and lives with her grandfather, out of pity. Once Chennappa sees young Thimmaraya, hanging out with good-for-nothing Kondaji, Chennappa suggests Thimmaraya to do household chores for Munithayi. One day, Munithayi sends Thimmaraya on an errand, saying that she will be done showering by the time he comes back while Chennappa is not at home. Afterwards, Thimmaraya meets Kondaji and tells him what he saw. Driven by his lust for sex, Kondaji tells Thimmaraya that he wants to see it as well, and Thimmaraya agrees to if he gets paid. One evening Chennappa and Munithayi has a fight. and a remorseful Chennappa leaves the house telling Thimmaraya to take care of Munithayi. That night, Thimmaraya, however, senses opportunity, and tells Kondaji about the opportunity. Thimmaraya tells Munithayi that Chennappa has come back to the house, when in reality it is Kondaji. Unbeknownst to the fact that Chennappa is not there, Munithayi serves Kondaji dinner and sleeps with him, mistaking him for Chennappa. Kondaji takes advanges of Munithayi and rapes her. After returning, a distraught Chennappa threatens to tell others that Munithayi has slept with Kondaji. Munithayi succumbs to the pressure for a few days before tricking Thimmaraya that she will sleep with him when in actually she wanted to beat him. Kondaji and Thimmaraya leave the town and Chennappa eventually forgives Munithayi.

== Cast ==
=== Hangu ===
- G. K. Govinda Rao as the professor
- Loknath as the contractor
- Manjula Rao
- Dr Govinda Manur

=== Atithi ===
- Kalyan Kumar as Sadanand
- B. Saroja Devi as Leelavathi

=== Munithaayi ===
- Aarathi as Munithayi
- Gangadhar as Chennappa
- Sampath as Munithayi's brother
- Rajinikanth as Kondaji
- Master Umesh as Thimmaraya

The uncredited cast includes Leelavathi, who plays Kamala, in Atithi.

== Production ==
The film was based on three short stories: Hangu by Giraddi Govindaraj, Athithi by Veena and Munithaayi by Eshwara Chandra.

== Release ==
The film was released on 23 January 1976 to positive reception.

== Awards ==
Karnataka State Film Awards 1975–76

  - Fourth Best Film
  - Best Actress – Aarathi
  - Best Supporting Actor – Master Umesh

== Legacy ==
The Tamil film Kai Kodukkum Kai (1984) was an extended version of the Munithayi segment from Katha Sangama. Rajinikanth, who played the antagonist role, played the lead role in the Tamil version. The antagonist role was also an inspiration for Rajinikanth's characterisation in the Tamil film 16 Vayathinile (1977) directed by debutant Bharathiraja, who was an assistant director to Puttanna Kanagal for Katha Sangama.

== Bibliography ==
- Ramachandran, Naman (2014) [2012]. Rajinikanth: The Definitive Biography. Penguin Books. ISBN 978-81-8475-796-5.
