= Dhoomakethu =

- DVD cover
- Directed by: R. N. Jayagopal
- Written by: Sri Bhagavathi Art Productions
- Screenplay by: R. N. Jayagopal
- Starring: Rajkumar; Udaya Chandrika; Udaykumar; Narasimharaju
- Cinematography: R. N. K. Prasad
- Edited by: P. Bakthavathsalam
- Music by: T. G. Lingappa
- Production company: Sri Bhagavathi Art Productions
- Release date: 21 August 1968
- Country: India
- Language: Kannada

Dhoomakethu is a 1968 Indian Kannada-language film, directed by R. N. Jayagopal. The film stars Rajkumar, Udaya Chandrika, Udaykumar and Narasimharaju, with a musical score composed by T. G. Lingappa. This film marks the directional debut of R. N. Jayagopal. Actor V.Ravichandran revealed that Dhoomakethu was his first on-screen appearance. He was seen alongside Shiva Rajkumar in a small sequence - marking the on-screen appearance of both the actors.

== Cast ==
- Rajkumar as Kumar
- Udaya Chandrika
- Udaykumar
- Narasimharaju
- Ranga
- Sampath
- Ganapathi Bhat
- Bangalore Nagesh
- Nagappa
- Shakti Prasad
- Govindaraj
- Sathyappa
- Srinivas
- Sadhana
- Indrani
- Girija
- Cladet
- Betti
- Enjaleen
- K. S. Ashwath in Guest Appearance
- Shylashree in Guest Appearance
- V.Ravichandran as Ravikumar (uncredited child artist)
- Shiva Rajkumar (uncredited child artist)

== Soundtrack ==
The music was composed by T. G. Lingappa.

No.	Song	Singers	Lyrics	Length (m:ss)
1	"Eako Ee Dina"	S. Janaki	Geethapriya	03:29
2	"Ondu Thaa"	L. R. Eswari	R. N. Jayagopal	03:19
3	"Aaha Aaha Idenu Nade"	P. B. Sreenivas	R. N. Jayagopal	03:34
4	"Aha Idhenu Nade"	P. Susheela	R. N. Jayagopal	03:30
5	"Anandha Chenda Thumbhi"	P. Susheela, P. B. Sreenivas	R. N. Jayagopal	03:22
