= Udaya Chandrika =

Indian actress

- Occupations: Actress, Producer
- Years active: 1962-1985 (retired)

Udaya Chandrika was an Indian actress of Kannada cinema who was active from the early 1960s to the mid-1970s. She also appeared in Tamil, Malayalam and Telugu-language films.

== Career ==
Udaya Chandrika began her career with Katari Veera, released in 1966. She played Dr. Rajkumar's sweetheart in that film. Later, she went on to play many roles in Kannada films till her last appearance in Udugore, released in 1979, with Kalyan Kumar.

She acted with almost all the stars of her time, like Dr. Rajkumar, Kalyan Kumar, Udaykumar, Rajesh, Vishnuvardhan, Srinath, Rajinikanth, etc. She even worked with Sivaji Ganesan, MGR, Prem Nazir, Krishna in her other language films.

She produced two films under her banner Chandrika Films, Asadhya Aliya, starring Vishnuvardhan and Kiladi Aliya, starring Shankar Nag in the lead roles.

Her famous films are Thillana Mohanambal, Katari Veera, Dhoomakethu, Bhoopathi Ranga, Anchusundarikal, Pattukunte Laksha, etc.

== Filmography ==
Year	Movie	Co-Star	Language	Notes
1962	Deivathin Deivam		Tamil	
1965	Anandhi		Tamil	
1965	Ennathan Mudivu		Tamil	
1966	Avan Pithana?		Tamil	
1966	Periya Manithan		Tamil	
1966	Katari Veera	Dr. Rajkumar	Kannada	
1967	Rajathi		Tamil	
1967	Maadi Veettu Mappilai		Tamil	
1967	Manassiddare Marga	Rajashankar	Kannada	
1968	Thillana Mohanambal		Tamil	
1968	Bhagya Devathe	Dr. Rajkumar	Kannada	
1968	Nadamantrapu Siri		Telugu	
1968	Dhoomakethu	Dr. Rajkumar	Kannada	
1968	Chinnari Puttanna	Ramesh	Kannada	
1968	Anchu Sundarikal		Malayalam	
1968	Inspector		Malayalam	
1969	Mallammana Pavada	Dr. Rajkumar, B. Saroja Devi	Kannada	
1969	Suvarna Bhoomi	Rajesh, Sudarshan	Kannada	
1970	Penn Deivam		Tamil	
1970	Bhale Kiladi	Srinath	Kannada	
1970	Malli Pelli		Telugu	
1970	Bhoopathi Ranga	Dr. Rajkumar	Kannada	
1970	Mrathyu Panjaradalli CID 555	Udaykumar, Srinath	Kannada	
1970	Ishq Par Zor Nahin		Hindi	Special Appearance
1971	Oru Thaai Makkal		Tamil	
1971	Hennu Honnu Mannu	Rajesh	Kannada	
1971	Bethala Gudda	Rajesh	Kannada	
1972	Seethe Alla Savithri	Vishnuvardhan	Kannada	
1972	Uttara Dakshina	Ramesh, Kalpana	Kannada	
1973	Engal Thaai		Tamil	
1973	Bettada Bhairava	Udaykumar	Kannada	
1974	Swati Natchathiram		Tamil	
1975	Piriya Vidai		Tamil	
1975	Asha Soudha	Udaykumar, Rajesh, Kalpana	Kannada	
1975	Bhaarya Illaatha Raathri		Malayalam	
1976	Dasavatharam		Tamil	
1976	Baduku Bangaravayithu	Rajesh, Srinath, Jayanthi, Manjula	Kannada	
1976	Balu Jenu	Gangadhar, Arathi, Rajinikanth	Kannada	
1976	Makkala Bhagya		Kannada	Guest Appearance
1976	Kadgichchu	Ramgopal	Kannada	
1976	Namma Oora Devaru	Rajesh	Kannada	
1977	Karthavyada Kare	Yashraj, B. V. Radha	Kannada	
1979	Udugore	Kalyan Kumar	Kannada	
1979	Asadhya Aliya		Kannada	As Producer
1985	Kiladi Aliya	Kalyan Kumar, Shankar Nag	Kannada	

== Bibliography ==
- Ramachandran, Naman (2014) [2012]. Rajinikanth: The Definitive Biography. New Delhi: Penguin Books. ISBN 978-0-14-342111-5.
