= Seetha (1970 film) =

- Directed by: Vadiraj
- Written by: P V Y Raman; Mahesh; R. N. Jayagopal
- Produced by: Harini
- Starring: Gangadhar; Kalpana; Srinath
- Cinematography: Shekar
- Edited by: P. N. Murthy
- Music by: Vijaya Bhaskar
- Production company: Vijaya Bharathi
- Release date: 1970
- Running time: 161 minutes
- Country: India
- Language: Kannada

Seetha is a 1970 Kannada-language romantic drama film directed actor Vadiraj and produced by actress Harini. The film starred Gangadhar, Kalpana and Srinath.

The film's soundtrack and score by Vijaya Bhaskar was widely acclaimed.

== Cast ==
- Gangadhar as Ramanath
- Kalpana as Seetha
- Srinath
- Ramesh
- K. S. Ashwath
- Srilalitha
- Seetharam
- Indrani

== Soundtrack ==
The music was composed by Vijaya Bhaskar with lyrics by R. N. Jayagopal. All the songs composed for the film were received extremely well and considered as evergreen songs.

Track listing
No.	Title	Lyrics	Singer(s)	Length
1.	"Barede Neenu Ninna Hesara"	R. N. Jayagopal	P. B. Sreenivas	03:31
2.	"Barede Neenu Ninna Hesara"	R. N. Jayagopal	S. Janaki	03:31
3.	"Ee Cheluvanu Kadeda"	R. N. Jayagopal	P. B. Sreenivas, L. R. Anjali	03:27
4.	"Shubhashaya Maduveya Ee Bandha"	R. N. Jayagopal	S. P. Balasubrahmanyam	04:49
