= Devaru Kotta Vara =

1976 Indian film directed by R. Ramamurthy

- Directed by: R. Ramamurthy
- Written by: Chi. Udaya Shankar (dialogues)
- Screenplay by: R. Ramamurthy
- Story by: K. S. Gopalakrishnan
- Produced by: R. Rama Sheshan; R. Kashi Vishwanathan
- Starring: Vishnuvardhan; Gangadhar; T. N. Balakrishna; K. S. Ashwath
- Cinematography: Ganesh Pandyan
- Edited by: R. Ramamurthy
- Music by: M. Ranga Rao
- Production company: Sri Rama Enterprise
- Release date: 1976
- Running time: 136 min
- Country: India
- Language: Kannada

Devaru Kotta Vara ( transl. Boon given by god) is a 1976 Indian Kannada-language film, directed by R. Ramamurthy and produced by R. Rama Sheshan and R. Kashi Vishwanathan. The film stars Vishnuvardhan, Gangadhar, T. N. Balakrishna, and K. S. Ashwath. The film's musical score was done by M. Ranga Rao. The film was a remake of Tamil film Vazhaiyadi Vazhai (1972).

== Cast ==
- Vishnuvardhan as Shankar
- Gangadhar as Shivu
- T. N. Balakrishna
- K. S. Ashwath as Ranganna
- Jayanthi as Janaki
- B. V. Radha
- Savitri
- Leelavathi as Parvati
- Seetharam
- Hanumanthachar
- Vijayarao
- Keshavamurthy
- Shyam
- Iyengar
- Rathnakar
- Sunitha
- M. Jayashree
- Papamma
- Mithravinda

== Soundtrack ==
The music was composed by M. Ranga Rao.

No.	Song	Singers	Lyrics	Length (m:ss)
1	"Belura Gudiyalli"	S. P. Balasubrahmanyam, Vani Jayaram	Chi. Udaya Shankar	03:27
2	"Indina Yee Irulu"	S. P. Balasubrahmanyam	Chi. Udaya Shankar	03:17
