= Yaava Janmada Maitri =

- Directed by: Geethapriya
- Written by: Ma.Bhi.She
- Based on: Jeevana Chaduranga
- Produced by: M. V. Venkatachalam
- Starring: Gangadhar; Kalpana; K. S. Ashwath; Narasimharaju
- Cinematography: V. Manohar
- Edited by: Bal G. Yadav; N. M. Victor
- Music by: Vijaya Bhaskar
- Production company: Sudarshan Films (P) Limited
- Release date: 1972
- Running time: 153 minutes
- Country: India
- Language: Kannada

Yaava Janmada Maitri is a 1972 Kannada language romantic drama film directed by Geethapriya and starring Gangadhar and Kalpana in the lead roles. The film is a direct screen adaptation of the Ma. Bhi. She novel "Jeevana Chaduranga". Actress Vaishali Kasaravalli made her debut in this film, opposite comedian Narasimharaju. The film was remade in Telugu in 1973 as Sarada, in Tamil in 1973 as Radha and in Hindi in 1975 as Dulhan.

Besides direction, Geethapriya also wrote the lyrics, screenplay and dialogues and won Karnataka State Film Award for the year 1972 for this story. The soundtrack and original score composed by Vijaya Bhaskar was widely acclaimed and won the State Award for music. Actress Kalpana got her maiden Filmfare Best Actress award for her complex portrayal of the lead character.

== Cast ==
- Kalpana as Lalitha
- Gangadhar as Krishna Murthy
- K. S. Ashwath as Shankar, Lalitha's brother
- Narasimharaju
- Vaishali Kasaravalli
- B. V. Radha
- Rathna
- Dr. Sampath Kumar

== Crew ==
- Producer: M V Venkatachalam
- Production Company: Sudarshan Films (P) Limited
- Director: Geethapriya
- Music: Vijaya Bhaskar
- Lyrics: Geethapriya
- Story: Ma Bhi She
- Screenplay: Geethapriya
- Dialogues: Geethapriya
- Editing: Bal G Yadav, N M Victor
- Cinematography: V Manohar
- Art Direction: Perumal Raju

== Soundtrack ==
The songs composed by Vijaya Bhaskar and sung by P. Susheela, S. Janaki and L. R. Anjali found wide reach and considered one of the best soundtracks winning him a State Award.

Sl No	Song title	Singers	Lyrics
1	"Madhura Murali Lola"	P. Susheela	Geethapriya
2	"Manjula Naada"	S. Janaki	Geethapriya
3	"Jyothi Kirana Kande"	P. Susheela	Geethapriya
4	"Ananda Kanda"	S. Janaki, L. R. Anjali	Geethapriya
5	"Savira Preshneya"	P. Susheela	Geethapriya

== Awards ==
- Karnataka State Film Awards
1. Second Best Film
2. Best Music Director - Vijaya Bhaskar
- Filmfare Awards South
1. Best Actress - Kalpana
