= Bhoopathi Ranga =

1970 film

- Directed by: Geethapriya
- Screenplay by: Geethapriya
- Story by: Bhaskar Movies
- Produced by: Bhaskar Movies
- Starring: Rajkumar; Udaya Chandrika
- Cinematography: Prakash
- Edited by: Bal G. Yadav
- Music by: Vijaya Bhaskar
- Production company: Bhaskar Movies
- Release date: 1970
- Running time: 157 minutes
- Country: India
- Language: Kannada

Bhoopathi Ranga is a 1970 Indian Kannada language drama film written and directed by Geethapriya. It stars Rajkumar, Udaya Chandrika and Renuka. The film's story was written and produced by Bhaskar Movies. The future director H. R. Bhargava worked as an associate director in this film.

== Cast ==
- Rajkumar
- Udaya Chandrika
- Renuka
- Rathna
- Narasimharaju
- Dinesh
- Ashwath Narayan
- Prem Dinakar
- C. R. Sampath Kumaran

== Soundtrack ==
The music of the film was composed by Vijaya Bhaskar and lyrics for the soundtrack written by Geethapriya. The song "Hakkiyu Haaruthide" and the cabaret number "Rasika Rasika" are considered among of the most popular and evergreen songs in Kannada cinema.

=== Track list ===
Title	Singer(s)
"Nagareeka Manava"	P. Susheela
"Hakkiyu Haaruthide"	P. B. Sreenivas
"Oho Muddina Mallige"	P. B. Sreenivas
"Rasika Rasika"	L. R. Eswari
"Goodalli Thai Hakki"	P. Susheela
"Hasuvina Veshada"	P. B. Sreenivas

== See also ==
- Kannada films of 1970
