= Shani Prabhava =

1977 Indian film directed by Ratnakar-Madhu

- Directed by: Ratnakar-Madhu
- Written by: Sorat Ashwath
- Produced by: N. Jyothi
- Starring: Vishnuvardhan; Bhavani; Sampath; K. S. Ashwath; Saroja Devi B.; Udaya Kumar
- Cinematography: R. Madhu
- Edited by: P. U. S. Manyam
- Music by: M. Ranga Rao
- Production company: Krupa Sagari Chithra
- Release date: 1977
- Running time: 119 minutes
- Country: India
- Language: Kannada

Shani Prabhava is a 1977 black and white Kannada film directed by Ratnakar-Madhu and starring actors Vishnuvardhan and Bhavani.

== Cast ==
- Vishnuvardhan
- Bhavani
- Sampath
- K. S. Ashwath
- B. Saroja Devi
- Udaya Kumar
- Gangadhar
- Balakrishna
- Subba Rao
- Saraswathi
- Indrani
- Ramkumar
- Rajasree
- Dikki Madhavarao
- Thoogudeepa Srinivas
- Anantharam Maccheri
- Srinivas Iyengar
- Kumari Chaya
- Chandra Shekar

== Soundtrack ==
The music was composed by M. Ranga Rao.

No.	Song	Singers	Lyrics
1	"Namo Namo Shaniraja"	P. B. Sreenivas	Yoganarashima
2	"Anandada Nandana"	S. P. Balasubrahmanyam, N. Jyothi	
3	"Belagithu Kailasade"	P. Susheela	
4	"Haayagi Malagu Halgenne Kanda"	P. Susheela	
5	"Kaadihe Iniya Naa"	N. Jyothi	
6	"O Shanideva"	S. Janaki	
