= Samshaya Phala =

- Directed by: A. M. Sameullah
- Written by: A. M. Sameullah
- Screenplay by: A. M. Sameullah
- Story by: A. M. Sameullah
- Produced by: A. M. Sameullah
- Starring: Udaya Kumar; Srinath; Jayanthi
- Cinematography: K. Janakiram
- Edited by: P. Bhaktavatsalam
- Music by: Salil Chowdhary
- Production company: Bawa Movies
- Release date: 1971
- Running time: 156 minutes
- Country: India
- Language: Kannada

Samshaya Phala is a 1971 Indian Kannada language romantic drama film written, produced and directed by A. M. Sameullah under the banner of Bawa Movies. It starsUdaya Kumar along with Srinath and Jayanthi, in the lead roles. The film featured a successful soundtrack composed by the renowned Hindi music composer Salil Chowdhary.

The film won an award at the 1970-71 Karnataka State Film Awards for Best Music Direction.

== Cast ==
- Udaykumar
- Jayanthi
- Srinath
- Pandari Bai
- Kanchana
- Sampath
- Jayaram
- Shivaram
- Jayashree
- Bheema Rao

== Soundtrack ==
The music for the film was composed by Salil Chowdhary, marking his debut in Kannada cinema. The lyrics for the soundtrack were written by Ku. Ra. Seetharama Sastry, popularly known as 'Kurasi.' The cabaret dance song "Dooradinda Bandantha" featuring the vocals by L. R. Eswari was exceptionally well received and is considered one of the best dance songs in Kannada cinema.

== Awards ==
- Karnataka State Film Awards – 1970–71
1. Karnataka State Film Award for Best Music Director – Salil Chowdhary

== See also ==
- Kannada films of 1971
