= Nanna Thamma =

- Directed by: K. Babu Rao
- Written by: K. Babu Rao
- Screenplay by: K. Babu Rao
- Produced by: K. V. Guptha
- Starring: Rajkumar; Jayanthi; Gangadhar; R. Nagendra Rao
- Cinematography: Madhava Bul Bule
- Edited by: R. Hanumantha Rao
- Music by: Ghantasala
- Production company: Vijaya Pictures Circuit
- Distributed by: Vijaya Pictures Circuit
- Release date: 26 October 1970
- Running time: 167 min
- Country: India
- Language: Kannada

Nanna Thamma ( transl. My younger brother) is a 1970 Indian Kannada-language film, directed by K. Babu Rao and produced by K. V. Guptha. The film stars Rajkumar, Jayanthi, Gangadhar and R. Nagendra Rao. The film has musical score by Ghantasala. The film is a remake of the director's own 1969 Telugu movie Jarigina Katha. Ghantasala retained the Telugu song Bhale Manchi Roju in the Kannada version as Ide Hosa Haadu. The film was not a huge success at the box office.

== Cast ==
- Dr. Rajkumar
- Jayanthi
- Gangadhar
- R. Nagendra Rao
- Balakrishna
- Dinesh
- Nagappa
- H. R. Shastry
- Hanumanthachar
- Shyam
- Thimmayya
- Narayan
- Master Prakash
- C. Nageshwara Rao
- Vijayabhanu
- Ramadevi
- Papamma
- Baby Brahmaji
- B. Jayamma in Guest Appearance

== Soundtrack ==
The music was composed by Ghantasala. Ghantasala retained the Telugu song "Bhale Manchi Roju" in the Kannada version as "Ide Hosa Haadu".

No.	Song	Singers	Lyrics	Length (m:ss)
1	"Aa murali Raagarasa"	P. Susheela	Kanagal Prabhkara Sastry	
2	"Ide Hosa Haadu"	P. B. Sreenivas	Kanagal Prabhkara Sastry	03:28
3	"Nee nagalu hagalalli"	P. Susheela, P. B. Sreenivas	Kanagal Prabhkara Sastry	
4	"Krishna Krishna"	P. Susheela	Kanagal Prabhkara Sastry	
5	"Nene Nenedu"	P. Susheela	Kanagal Prabhkara Sastry	
