= Sharapanjara =

1971 Indian Kannada movie by Puttanna Kanagal

- Poster
- Directed by: Puttanna Kanagal
- Written by: Triveni
- Screenplay by: Puttanna Kanagal
- Based on: Sharapanjara by Triveni
- Produced by: C. S. Rajah
- Starring: Kalpana; Gangadhar; Leelavathi; K. S. Ashwath
- Cinematography: D. V. Rajaram
- Edited by: V. P. Krishna
- Music by: Vijaya Bhaskar
- Production company: Vardhini Art Pictures
- Distributed by: Vardhini Art Pictures
- Release date: 4 April 1971
- Running time: 172 minutes
- Country: India
- Language: Kannada

Sharapanjara ( English: Cage of Arrows) is a 1971 Indian Kannada language film directed by Puttanna Kanagal, based on a novel by Triveni of the same name, and starring Kalpana and Gangadhar in lead roles. This film is considered one of the best Kannada movies ever made. Triveni's novel was richly visual and Puttanna not only stayed faithful to the novel on screen but also retained most of the novel's dialogues and credited Triveni for them.

The film won the award for Best Feature Film in Kannada at the 20th National Film Awards in 1972. It also won in three categories at the 1970-71 Karnataka State Film Awards including the award for First Best Film.

The film was later remade in Telugu as Krishnaveni (1974) starring Vanisri.

== Plot ==
The film revolves around the societal perception of the mentally ill. Kaveri is an educated, sophisticated, and beautiful woman who hails from a loving middle class family. A chance meeting at a friend's wedding and the hero Satish (Gangadhar) falls in love with Kaveri. They get married with the blessings of their parents. They build their dream house, have a son, buy a car - they not only form a picture-perfect couple but are also generally prosperous. When Kaveri conceives for the second time, the doctor expresses concern over her health. Once the baby is born, Kaveri is tormented by memories of being sexually assaulted during her college days and develops symptoms of post-partum psychosis. She is admitted to an in-house mental healthcare facility for treatment.

After recovery, when Kaveri returns home, Satish treats her with callousness. Kaveri faces scorn of some sort or the other from her family, neighbours and society in general, as well, owing to the stigma around mental illness. Eventually when Kaveri discovers that her husband is having an extra-marital relationship with a female colleague, her post-partum psychosis symptoms relapse and he has to be readmitted to the mental healthcare facility.

The movie dwells on two major social issues. One, the social acceptability of mental illness. The general response Kaveri receives from her cook and servants, her family members and neighbours, depicts the lack of sensitivity that is so much needed for people like Kaveri, and the repercussions. Two, the male ego and entitlement - her husband spurns her because of her past incident and uses it as an alibi to be unfaithful to her. In addition, even her guilt and trauma stem from her friend from college forcing himself on her.

== Cast ==
- Kalpana as Kaveri
- Gangadhar as Satish, Kaveri's husband
- Srinath as Sudheer, Satish's friend (cameo)
- Leelavathi as Vijaya, Sathish's sister
- K. S. Ashwath as Narayanappa, Kaveri's father
- Advani Lakshmi Devi as Vishali, Kaveri's mother
- Chindodi Leela as Vimala
- M. N. Lakshmi Devi as Maithili
- Shivaram as Bhatta
- Narasimharaju as Maithili's husband
- Loknath as a psychologist
- R. T. Rama
- Kala
- Jayamma
- G. V. Malathamma
- G. V. Swarnamma
- Jr. Jayanthi
- Bangalore Nagesh
- Ganapathi Bhat
- Sharapanjara Iyengar as Iyengar, Satish's colleague
- G. M. Nanjappa
- K. M. Cariappa as guest in wedding (uncredited)
- Puttanna Kanagal as guest in wedding (uncredited)

== Production ==
The song "Sandesha Maghasandesha" was shot at Madikeri and Coorg.

== Themes and influences ==
Kavya Murthy in her article for Deccan Herald compared the film to the novel Faces in The Water (1961) by Janet Frame due to similarity in the core concept.

== Soundtrack ==
The soundtrack composed by Vijaya Bhaskar was well received by the audience.

Title	Singers	Lyrics
"Bandhana Sharapanjaradali Bandhana"	P. Susheela	Vijaya Narasimha
"Biligiri Rangayya Neene Helayya"	P. Susheela	Kanagal Prabhakara Sastry
"Sandesha Megha Sandesha"	P. Susheela	Vijaya Narasimha
"Hadinaalku Varsha Vanavasadindha"	P. Susheela	Vijaya Narasimha
"Kodagina Kaaveri"	P. Susheela, P. B. Sreenivas	Kanagal Prabhakara Sastry
"Uttara Dhruvadim Dakshina Dhruvaku"	P. Susheela, P. B. Sreenivas	D. R. Bendre
"Bandhana Sharapanjaradali Bandhana"	Devadas	Vijaya Narasimha

== Reception ==
In a retrospective review in 2024, Spoorthi Niranjan of Feminism In India wrote, "Even with its realism and misfortunate ending taken into account, Sharapanjara, among other Kanagal films, was both incredibly socially impactful and left a lasting mark on Kannada cinema".

== Awards ==
20th National Film Awards

- Best Feature Film in Kannada

Filmfare Awards South

- The film won Filmfare Award for Best Film – Kannada (1971)

1970–71 Karnataka State Film Awards

- First Best Film – C. S. Raja
- Best Actress – Kalpana
- Best Screenplay – Puttanna Kanagal

15th International Film Festival of India

- Screened in Kannada cinema Retrospect section.
