= Gangadhar =

Indian actor (1936–2003)

- Born: Gangadhar; 1936; Koratagere Tumkuru district
- Died: 27 December 2003 (aged 67); Bangalore, Karnataka, India
- Other name: Rajendra Kumar
- Occupation: Actor

Gangadhar (1936–2003) was an Indian actor known for his work in Kannada cinema. A character actor who transitioned from stage to films in the mid-1960s, he had a brief period of success when his performances in social-dramas such as Gejje Pooje (1969), Sharapanjara (1971) and Seetha (1970) were noted. In addition to the former two, he starred in Katha Sangama (1975) and Ranganayaki (1981), all of which were directed by Puttanna Kanagal. Other films he starred in include Nanna Thamma (1970), Aliya Geleya (1971) and Bhale Adrushtavo Adrushta (1972).

Gangadhar returned to stage in the 1980s after film opportunities failed to come his way; poor health led him to retire from acting in 1995, when he was aged 59. Gangadhar appeared in a total of 80 Kannada-language films and was awarded the Rajyotsava Award by the government of Karnataka in recognition of his contribution to Kannada cinema. He died in 2003, aged 67.

== Early life ==
Gangadhar was born in 1936. He obtained a diploma in mechanical engineering and started working at the Hindustan Aeronautics Limited (HAL) in Bangalore. While there, he staged plays like Samsare Nauke, Echamanayaka and Vijayotsava. He had achieved considerable success during his time at the theatre group Prabhat Kalavidaru.

== Career ==
A makeup artist, Mahadevaiah, introduced Gangadhar to filmmaker G. V. Iyer, who cast him in Chowkada Deepa (1969) in the lead role. He was credited as Rajendra Kumar for the film. The film also marked the debut of actor Srinath. The film was an attempt to blend into the hitherto onset of Parallel cinema, but failed to perform well. However, Gangadhar's first release was the Rajkumar-starrer Lagna Pathrike (1967). He played a stage actor in the film. After Chowkada Deepa, he starred in Puttanna Kanagal's successful film, Gejje Pooje (1969), alongside Kalpana. He subsequently appeared in Nanna Thamma (1970), playing the brother of Rajkumar's character. He was paired opposite Kalpana again in Seetha (1970). A popular collaboration during the time, the two went on to star together subsequently in Sotu Geddavalu (1971), Yaava Janmada Maitri (1972) and Bhale Adrushtavo Adrushta (1972). In Bandhavya (1972), he played a Raja, a thief and a brother of K. S. Ashwath's character, who reforms himself in order to pursue his love interest.

The year 1971 saw seven releases starring Gangadhar, including the hugely successful Sharapanjara and B. R. Panthulu's Aliya Geleya. Gangadhar's Satish played husband of a postpartum psychosis-affected Kaveri (played by Kalpana) in Sharapanjara, who interns her to a mental asylum, before beginning to have an extramarital affair with an office colleague. Upon her return home after recovery, he mistreats her often reminding her of the illness. In 1972, Gangadhar had a total of four releases. He played Chennappa in Kanagal's anthology film Katha Sangama (1975), as the husband of a blind woman (played by Aarathi). Based on the novel Munithaayi, the plot follows Chennappa's struggle after knowing that his wife is raped by Rajinikanth's character. The remainder of the 1970s and 1980s saw less opportunities coming Gangadhar's way. Film historian Hariharapura Manjunath attributes it to the emergence of other leading men during the time such as Vishnuvardhan, Ambareesh and Shankar Nag among others. Gangadhar made occasional screen appearances in the 1980s; one notable role came in Bhakta Prahlada (1983), in which he played the Hindu deity Indra. In Mutthu Ondu Mutthu (1979), he played the father of female lead's character; in Jeevakke Jeeva (1981), a negative-shaded character; and in Karna (1986), the brother of Vishnuvardhan's character. During this time, Gangadhar returned to theatre and worked for a period of 12 years.

== Personal life ==
The 1990s saw worsening health condition of Gangadhar as he was ailing from diabetes, kidney-related illness and deteriorating eyesight. This was evident during the filming of Aata Hudugata (1995), which was his last screen appearance. In one of his last public appearances, the annual Kannada Film Directors Association event at the Chowdiah Memorial Hall, Bangalore, in April 2001, he teared up lamenting his deteriorating eyesight stating he was looking forward to his death. After prolonged illness, Gangadhar died at 11:15 p.m. (IST) on 27 December 2003 in Bangalore, aged 67.

== Partial filmography ==
Year	Title	Role	Notes
1967	Lagna Pathrike	Stage actor	
1969	Chowkada Deepa	Raghu	Credited as Rajendra Kumar
1969	Gejje Pooje	Somu	
1970	Nanna Thamma		
1970	Seetha	Ramnath	
1970	Kalyani	Ranganath	
1971	Sotu Geddavalu	Shankara Murthy	
1971	Sharapanjara	Sathish	
1971	Aliya Geleya	Mohan	
1971	Bhale Bhaskar	Ramesha	
1972	Bandhavya	Raja	
1972	Yaava Janmada Maitri	Krishna Murthy	
1972	Bhale Adrushtavo Adrushta	Krishna	
1972	Subhadra Kalyana		
1972	Malathi Madhava		
1972	Jeevana Jokali		
1973	Jaya Vijaya		
1973	Mane Belagida Sose		
1974	Mannina Magalu		
1975	Viplava Vanithe		
1976	Katha Sangama	Chennappa	
1976	Makkala Bhagya		
1976	Baalu Jenu	Ravi	
1976	Bangarada Gudi	Shankar	
1976	Devaru Kotta Vara	Shivu	
1976	Mugiyada Kathe		Guest appearance
1976	Bangalore Bhootha		
1977	Shani Prabhava		
1977	Sri Renukadevi Mahathme		
1977	Ruthugana		
1977	Manassinanthe Mangalya		
1979	Atthege Thakka Sose		
1979	Khandavideko Mamsavideko		
1980	Nyaya Neethi Dharma	Shekhar	
1980	Guru Sarvabhowma Sri Raghavendra Karune		
1981	Ranganayaki	Seth	Cameo
1981	Jeevakke Jeeva	Santosh	
1983	Bhakta Prahlada	Indra	
1986	Karna		
1988	Mithileya Seetheyaru		
1990	Ekalavya		
1990	Sri Sathyanarayana Pooja Phala		
1991	Central Rowdy		
1992	Harakeya Kuri		
1994	Rashmi		
1995	Aata Hudugata	Rajashekhar	
1996	Palegara		
