= Vijaya Bhaskar =

Indian music composer

Background information
- Born: 17 September 1924; Bangalore, Kingdom of Mysore, British India
- Died: 3 March 2002 (aged 77) Bangalore, Karnataka, India
- Genres: Film score, theatre
- Occupations: Composer, instrumentalist
- Years active: 1953–2001

Vijaya Bhaskar (Kannada: ವಿಜಯಭಾಸ್ಕರ್; 17 September 1924 – 3 March 2002) was an Indian music director and composer who composed music for several mainstream and experimental feature films in the Kannada film industry. Scoring music for over 720 films, Bhaskar worked in Tamil, Malayalam, Telugu, Marathi, Tulu and Konkani language films as well. He had a noted association with directors including KSL Swamy (Ravi), Puttanna Kanagal, Adoor Gopalakrishnan and a long association with singers including P. Susheela and Vani Jairam. He was given the title "Sangeetha Samrat".

Influenced by R C Boral and Mukul Mehta, Bhaskar developed his own style of music and introduced the concept of theme music in Kannada film industry. He is credited for inspiring producers to select popular works of Kannada poets through his music. He was awarded the Dr. Rajkumar Award and the prestigious Sur Singar Award from Mumbai music lovers (for his classical score in Malaya Marutha Kannada movie, directed by Ravi). He was also a recipient of Karnataka State Film Award for Best Music Director six times.

Some of Bhaskar's most popular soundtracks include Rani Honnamma, Santha Thukaram, Gejje Pooje, Mana Mechida Madadi, Belli Moda, Naandi, Sharapanjara, Naagarahaavu, Shubhamangala, Neela and Malaya Marutha.

Vijaya Bhaskar never got a chance to get Rajkumar to sing in his music direction (except for humming a few lines of Doniyolage Neenu in Uyyale) though Santha Thukaram in their combination won a National award. Rajkumar did sing at Vijaya Bhaskar's daughter's function.

== Biography ==
=== Career ===
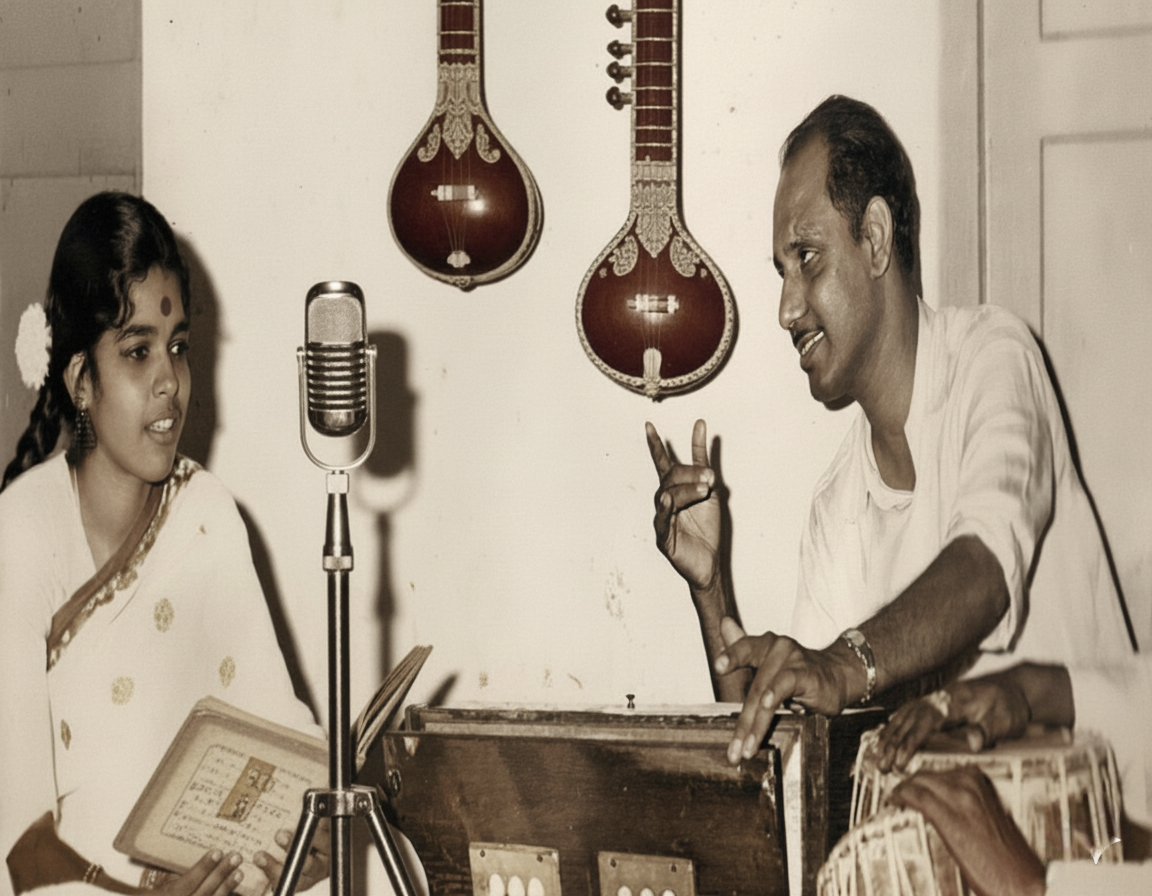
Vijaya Bhaskar recording a song with noted singer Bangalore Latha

Vijaya Bhaskar was born in Bangalore. He started his training in Music early in his life. His guru in Hindustani Classical music was Govinda Bhave who taught him the basics. Vijaya Bhaskar also learnt the intricacies of Carnatic Classical music and the piano.

Vijaya Bhaskar was busy in Bombay, assisting music directors like Naushad and Madan Mohan. In Bombay Bhaskar was sitting in a restaurant in Matunga and chatting with a friend and then accidentally met B R Krishnamurthy (BRK). Bhaskar was speaking in Kannada and overheard BRK. BRK used to work as an assistant to R Nagendra Rao and had worked on several pictures with him. Bhaskar told him he was a musician. He asked him whether he would make music for a Kannada film they were making. Bhaskar finally came down from Bombay in 1953 to do the score for the film Sri Rama Puja. He took charge and single-handedly changed the face of Kannada film music. The Kannada film industry got its first original music composer.

Puttanna Kanagal who was assisting BR Pantulu, with Bellimoda became independent Director. VB was the music director for Belli Moda. Film became an instant success and cemented their association. After Belli Moda, there was Gejje Pooje, and later Naagarahaavu. He worked with Kanagal continuously till the '80s and then there was a break when M Ranga Rao took over for films like Ranganayaki. Bhaskar came back for Maanasa Sarovara.

He scored music for nearly 670 movies.

=== Style ===
Influenced by R.C. Boral and Mukul Mehta, Bhaskar developed his own style of music. He also proved that Kannada films too can have theme music. Bhaskar did not limit his musical talent for commercial movies alone. According to Vijaya Bhaskar folk music was the forerunner of all existing forms of music in the world. His specialty lay in the fact that he was equally comfortable using a minimum number of instruments as well as a whole orchestra. Vijaya Bhaskar's compositions are melodious and lilting. He was comfortable composing light songs as well as ghazals. He also has quite a few devotional and popular light songs to his credit. His range was extensive and included all genres of music.

He directed music for experimental movies like Grahana, Yellindalo Bandavaru and Naandi. Bhaskar is credited for inspiring producers to select popular works of Kannada poets through his music. Some of the popular numbers include "Moodala Maneya" in Belli Moda (poem by D. R. Bendre) and "Uttara Dhruvadim" in Sharapanjara (also by D. R. Bendre).

=== Other languages ===
Even though Vijaya Bhaskar's first composition was for a Kannada film this prolific composer also composed music for films in Tamil Telugu Malayalam Konkani Oriya and Tulu. Apart from music composition he has also given background score for several movies. Popular Malayalam director Adoor Gopalakrishnan always preferred Bhaskar for his movies. Gopalakrishnan was very much impressed when Bhaskar gave music for his movie Mathilukal which had no songs at all. All in all Bhaskar gave music for three of Gopalakrishnan's films in Malayalam – Kathapurushan, Vidheyan and Mathilukal. In Hindi Bhaskar did G. V. Iyer's Vivekananda.

His music to Tulu language movie Koti Chennayya (1973) is very popular in Mangalore.

Bhaskar also went to London and did an English film. The film was called Robert Clive, and it was released in India also. It was shot mostly in India, and Bhaskar did a major part of the score.

=== Death ===
Vijaya Bhaskar died on the morning of 3 March 2002 following a cardiac arrest at his residence in J. P. Nagar locality of Bangalore. He was 77, and left behind his wife, a son, two daughters and 5 grandchildren. His body was cremated in Wilson gardens crematorium on 5 March.

=== Awards ===
Dr. Rajkumar Award (2001)

Sursingar Prashasthi

Karnataka State Film Award for Best Music Director

- 1967–68: Belli Moda
- 1971–72: Yaava Janmada Maitri
- 1972–73: Sankalpa
- 1983–84: Dharani Mandala Madhyadolage
- 1989–90: Muraligana Amruthapana
- 1991–92: Pathitha Pavani

== Discography ==
=== Kannada ===
- Sri Rama Pooja (1955)
- Bhagya Chakra (1956)
- Premada Putri (1957)
- Rani Honnamma (1960)
- Mana Mechhida Madadi (1963)
- Santha Thukaram (1963)
- Post Master (1964)
- Pathiye Daiva (1964)
- Naandi (1964)
- Beretha Jeeva (1965)
- Amarajeevi (1965)
- Thoogudeepa (1966)
- Belli Moda (1967)
- Lagna Pathrike (1967)
- Premakku Permitte (1967)
- Manku Dinne (1968)
- Mysore Tanga (1968)
- Bhagyada Bagilu (1968)
- Ananda Kanda (1968)
- Anna Thamma (1968)
- Mannina Maga (1968)
- Nata Sarvabhouma (1968)
- Suvarna Bhoomi (1969)
- Namma Makkalu (1969)
- Mallammana Pavaada (1969)
- Eradu Mukha (1969)
- Makkale Manege Manikya (1969)
- Uyyale (1969)
- Brundavana (1969)
- Gejje Pooje (1970)
- Arishina Kumkuma (1970)
- Anireekshita (1970)
- Bhoopathi Ranga (1970)
- Takka Bitre Sikka (1970)
- Lakshmi Saraswathi (1970)
- Baalu Belagithu (1970)
- Aaru Mooru Ombatthu (1970)
- Seetha (1970)
- Sharapanjara (1971)
- Signalman Siddappa (1971)
- Kalyani (1971)
- Bhale Adhrustavo Adhrusta (1971)
- Mukthi (1971)
- Baala Panjara (1972)
- Yaava Janmada Maitri (1972)
- Hrudaya Sangama (1972)
- Naa Mechida Huduga (1972)
- Nanda Gokula (1972)
- Mareyada Deepavali (1972)
- Jeevana Jokaali (1972)
- Naagarahaavu (1972)
- Devaru Kotta Thangi (1973)
- CID 72 (1973)
- Sankalpa (1973)
- Seetheyalla Savitri (1973)
- Jaya Vijaya (1973)
- Mane Belagida Sose (1973)
- Kesarina Kamala (1973)
- Abachurina Post Office (1973)
- Upasane (1974)
- Shubhamangala (1975)
- Kasthuri Vijaya (1975)
- Bhagya Jyothi (1975)
- Ninagagi Naanu (1975)
- Bili Hendthi (1975)
- Hennu Samsarada Kannu (1975)
- Katha Sangama (1976)
- Makkala Bhagya (1976)
- Besuge (1976)
- Chiranjeevi (1976)
- Thulasi (1976)
- Maya Manushya (1976)
- Phalithamsha (1976)
- Harake (1977)
- Sangharsha (1977)
- Deepa (1977)
- Maagiya Kanasu (1977)
- Mugdha Manava (1977)
- Kumkuma Rakshe (1977)
- Banashankari (1977)
- Haavina Hejje (1978)
- Sirithanakke Saval (1978)
- Paduvaaralli Pandavaru (1978)
- Premayana (1978)
- Thappida Taala (1978)
- Vasantha Lakshmi (1978)
- Aluku (1978)
- Amarnath (1978)
- Adalau Badalu (1979)
- Sadananda (1979)
- Muyyi (1979)
- Mallige Sampige (1979)
- Dangeyedda Makkalu (1979)
- Akhanda Brahmacharigalu (1980)
- Hantakana Sanchu (1980)
- Kappu Kola (1980)
- Ellindalo Bandavaru (1980)
- Subbi Subbakka Suvvalali (1980)
- Nammammana Sose (1980)
- Mother (1980)
- Bangarada Jinke (1980)
- Mithuna (1980)
- Driver Hanumanthu (1980)
- Leader Vishwanath (1981)
- Theerada Bayake (1981)
- Chalagara (1981)
- Grahana (1981)
- Naari Swargakke Daari (1981)
- Baalu Bangara (1981)
- Bangarada Mane (1981)
- Preethisi Nodu (1981)
- Jodi Jeeva (1982)
- Jimmy Gallu (1982)
- Maanasa Sarovara (1982)
- Suvarna Sethuve (1982)
- Devara Theerpu (1983)
- Anveshane (1983)
- Dharani Mandala Madhyadolage (1983)
- Banker Margayya (1983)
- Matthe Vasantha (1983)
- Ananda Sagara (1983)
- Mutthaide Bhagya (1983)
- Sanchari (1983)
- Benki (1983)
- Shubha Muhurtha (1984)
- Amrutha Ghalige (1984)
- Huli Hejje (1984)
- Pavitra Prema (1984)
- Runamukthalu (1984)
- Haavu Eni Aata (1985)
- Maavano Aliyano (1985)
- Masanada Hoovu (1985)
- Thavaru Mane (1986)
- Nenapina Doni (1986)
- Sundara Swapnagalu (1986)
- Malaya Marutha (1986)
- Huli Hebbuli(1987)
- Thaliya Aane (1987)
- Aaseya Bale (1987)
- Avasthe (1987)
- Bandha Muktha (1987)
- Surya (1987)
- Anthima Ghatta (1987)
- Thayiya Aase (1988)
- Bhoomi Thaayane (1988)
- Gudugu Sidilu (1988)
- Thayigobba Karna (1988)
- Mithileya Seetheyaru (1988)
- Kadina Benki (1988)
- Oorige Hosaba (1989)
- Thaligagi (1989)
- Madhu Maasa (1989)
- Amrutha Bindu (1989)
- Eduru Mane Meena (1990)
- Prathama Ushakirana (1990)
- Murali Gaana Amrutha Paana (1990)
- Pathitha Pavani (1990)
- Idhuve Jeevana (1991)
- Putta Hendathi (1992)
- Undu Hoda Kondu Hoda (1992)
- Harakeya Kuri (1992)
- Sangya Balya (1992)
- Jamboo Savari (1993)
- Super Nova 459 (1994)
- Gangavva Gangamayi (1994)
- Aagatha (1995)
- Hosa Baduku (1995)
- Hetthavala Koogu (1996)
- Avala Charitre (1998)
- Innondu Mukha (1998)
- Maha Edabidangi (1999)
- Neela (2001)
- Shravana Sambhrama (2003)
- Poorvapara (2004)
- Savira Mettilu (2006)

=== Tamil ===
- Anbe Deivam (1957)
- Engamma Sapatham (1974)
- Unga Veetu Kalyanam (1975)
- Yarukku Maappillai Yaro (1975)
- Thottadhellam Ponnaagum (1975)
- Mogam Muppadhu Varusham (1976)
- Mayangukiral Oru Maadhu (1975)
- Aadu Puli Aattam (1977)
- Olimayamana Ethirkalam (1977)
- Avar Enakke Sontham (1977)
- Thappu Thalangal (1978)
- Soundaryame Varuga Varuga (1980)
- Oru Kai Paappom (1983)

=== Malayalam ===
- Kusruthykuttan (1966)
- Jeevikkan Anuvadikku (1967)
- Paathirapattu (1967)
- Kayalkkarayil (1968)

=== Other languages ===
- Koti Chennaya (1973) (Tulu)
- Krishnaveni (1974) (Telugu)
- Ammaila Sapadham (1975) (Telugu)
- Mana Voori Pandavulu (1978) (Telugu)

== See also ==
- M. Ranga Rao
- T. G. Lingappa
- G. K. Venkatesh
- Rajan–Nagendra
