= Eradu Kanasu =

Eradu Kanasu (transl. Two dreams) may refer to:

- Eradu Kanasu (novel), a Kannada-language novel by Vani
- Eradu Kanasu (1974 film)
- Eradu Kanasu (2017 film)
