= V. P. Krishnan =

Indian film editor

- Born: Vasudevan P. Krishnan; 2 May 1930
- Died: 13 October 1996 (aged 66)
- Occupation: film editor

V.P. Krishnan (born Vasudevan P Krishnan, 2 May 1930 – 13 October 1996) was a Malayalam film editor. He worked in over five hundred films in Tamil, Malayalam, Kannada, Telugu and Hindi languages. This makes him one of the few editors to have worked for five of the biggest film industries in India.

A busy editor during his day, Krishnan always maintained a low profile. A few notable Tamil films that he worked on include Polladhavan, Paritchaikku Neramaachu, Andaman Kadhali, Mounam Sammadham, Karnan (as assistant), Vaai Kozhuppu, and Keezh Vaanam Sivakkum.

He won three Karnataka State Film Awards for Best Editor: 1967-68 for Belli Moda, 1974-75 for Upasane and in 1983-84 for Amrutha Ghalige. He won the Nandi Award for Best Editor for Magaadu. He was closely associated in several projects with former Kannada director Puttanna Kanagal. He also worked with the directors K. Madhu and Muktha Srinivasan on various films.

== Filmography ==
- Belli Moda (1967) (Kannada)
- Upasane (1974) (Kannada)
- Andaman Kadhali (1978) (Tamil)
- Dharmasere (1979) (Kannada)
- Polladhavan (1980) (Tamil)
- Keezh Vaanam Sivakkum (1981) (Tamil)
- Oohakachavadam (1988) (Malayalam)
- Vaai Kozhuppu (1989) (Tamil)
- Jagratha (1989) (Malayalam)
- Magaadu (1990) (Telugu)
- Mounam Sammadham (1990) (Tamil)
