= Pooja (1975 film) =

- Poster
- Directed by: Murugan-Kumaran
- Written by: N. R. Nandi (Dialogues)
- Story by: Eradu Kanasu by Vani
- Based on: Eradu Kanasu
- Produced by: M. Murugan; M. Kumaran; M. Saravanan; M. Balasubramanian; M. S. Guhan
- Starring: G. Ramakrishna; Vanisri; Manjula; Savitri; Kanta Rao; Suryakantam; Mikkilineni
- Cinematography: S. Maruthi Rao
- Edited by: R. G. Gopi
- Music by: Rajan–Nagendra
- Production company: AVM Productions
- Release date: 25 August 1975
- Country: India
- Language: Telugu

Pooja (transl. Prayer ritual) is a 1975 Telugu-language film directed by Murugan-Kumaran and produced by AVM Productions. It is a remake of the 1974 Kannada film Eradu Kanasu.

== Plot ==
Ramachandra Rao/Ramu and Lalitha fall in love and want to marry but Lalitha's father, who is also Ramu's uncle, breaks off relations with Ramu's family over some internal disputes. Ramu's mother falls ill after this incident and insists that he marry a girl of her choice. Ramu's father agrees with his wife too and requests Ramu to consider his mother's health. As a result, Ramu is forced to marry another girl, Gauri who is the daughter of a lawyer. However, he does not accept her as he is still in love with Lalitha. He behaves coldly towards her. Gauri, who is devoted to him, is hurt and perplexed by his behavior. She tries to win him over but grows frustrated. Ramu's parents observe this and decide to leave for a pilgrimage, giving Ramu and Gauri some space to work out their issues. Gauri breaks down and asks Ramu why he behaves this way with her. He refuses to explain anything, saying that he is helpless and asks her to go back to her parents' house. She refuses to leave. Ramu falls ill one day and Gauri nurses him back to health. He softens towards her. Then, he bumps into an old acquaintance at the doctor's office. He finds out that Lalitha has married him and has a young son. So he starts anew with Gauri.

== Cast ==
Actor	Character
G. Ramakrishna	Ramachandra Rao "Ramu"
Vanisri	Gauri
Chandra Mohan	Anand
Manjula	Lalita
Kanta Rao	Sivaramaiah, Ramu's father
Savitri	Sitamma
Krishna Kumari	Parvatamma
Mikkilineni	Kishtaiah, Lalita's father
Allu Ramalingaiah	
Relangi	Gauri's father
K. V. Chalam	
Balakrishna	
Suryakantham	

== Soundtrack ==
The music was composed by Rajan–Nagendra.

The song "Enneno Janmala Bandham" is known for its captivating lyrics.

Three songs from the Kannada original were retained by Rajan–Nagendra in the Telugu version. The original song "Endendu Ninnanu Marethu" was retained in the Telugu version as "Enneno Janmala Bandham". The original song "Baadi Hoda Balliyinda" was retained in the Telugu version as "Malleteega Vaadipoga Marala Poolu Pooyuna". The original song "Poojisalende Hoogala Thande" was retained in the Telugu version as "Poojalu Cheya Poolu Tecchanu".

All lyrics are written by Dasaradhi.

No.	Title	Music	Singer(s)	Length
1.	"Anthata Nee Roopam"	Rajan–Nagendra	S. P. Balasubrahmanyam, Vani Jayaram
2.	"Enneno Janmala Bandham"	Rajan–Nagendra	S. P. Balasubrahmanyam, Vani Jayaram
3.	"Malleteega Vaadipoga Marala Poolu Pooyuna"	Rajan–Nagendra	S. P. Balasubrahmanyam
4.	"Nee Daya Raadaa Raama Nee Daya Raadaa"	Tyagaraja	P. Susheela
5.	"Ningi Nela Okatayene"	Rajan–Nagendra	S. P. Balasubrahmanyam, Vani Jayaram
6.	"Poojalu Cheya Poolu Tecchanu"	Rajan–Nagendra	Vani Jayaram
