= Karnataka State Film Award for Best Editor =

State Film Award of the Indian State of Karnataka

- State award for contributions to Kannada cinema
- Awarded for: Best Editing by an Editor
- Sponsored by: Government of Karnataka
- Rewards: Silver Medal; ₹ 20,000
- First award: 1967-68
- Final award: 2021

Highlights
- Total awarded: 49
- First winner: V. P. Krishnan
- Last winner: Prateek Shetty

Karnataka State Film Award for Best Editor is a film award of the Indian state of Karnataka given during the annual Karnataka State Film Awards. The award honors Kannada-language films.

== Superlative winners ==
P. Bhakthavathsalam	6 Awards
Suresh Urs	5 Awards
Basavaraj Urs	4 Awards
• V. P. Krishnan • R. Janardhan • B. S. Kemparaju	3 Awards

== Award winners ==
The following is a partial list of award winners and the films for which they won.

Symbol	Meaning
†	Indicates a joint award for that year

Year	Winner	Film	Ref
2021	Pratheek Shetty	777 Charlie	
2020	Nagendra K. Ujjaini	Act 1978	
2019	Basavaraj Urs	Jhansi IPS	
2018	Suresh Arumugam	Trataka	
2017	Harish Komme	Mufti	
2016	C. Ravichandran	Mummy	
2015	Sujith Nayak	Chandi Kori	
2014	Srikanth	Ugramm	
2013	K. M. Prakash	Tony	
2012	P. R. Soundar Raj	Sagar	
2011	B. S. Kemparaju	Allide Nammane Illi Bande Summane	
2010-11	Suresh Urs	Aidondla Aidu	
2009-10	This Award Is Taken Back		
2008-09	Deepu S. Kumar	Junglee	
2007-08	Suresh Urs	Savi Savi Nenapu	
2006-07	Basavaraj Urs	Kallarali Hoovagi	
2005-06	S. Manohar	Aakash	
2004-05	T. Shashikumar	Kanti	
2003-04	B. S. Kemparaju	Lankesh Patrike	
2002-03	Basavaraj Urs	Sainika	
2001-02	Shyam	Kambalahalli	
2000-01	Anil Naidu	Mussanje	
1999-2000	S. Manohar	A. K. 47	
1998-99	Basavaraj Urs	Varsharuthu	
1997-98	T. Shashikumar	A	
1996-97	B.S. Kemparaju	Amrutha Varshini	
1995-96	K. Balu	Sipayi	
1994-95	R. Janardhan	Lockup Death	
1993-94	R. Janardhan	Shhh	
1992-93	K. Narasaiah	Aathanka	
1991-92	Suresh Urs	Mysore Mallige	
1990-91	R. Janardhan	Utkarsha	
1989-90	Suresh Urs	Panchama Veda	
1988-89	Gowtham Raju	Krishna Nee Kunidaga	
1987-88	D. Vasu	Pushpaka Vimana	
1986-87	M. N. Swamy	Tabarana Kathe	
1985-86	R. Rajan	Ajeya	
1984-85	R. Hanumantha Rao	Avala Antharanga	
1983-84	V. P. Krishnan	Amrutha Ghalige	
1982-83	P. Bhakthavathsalam	Haalu Jenu	
1981-82	K. Balu	Simhada Mari Sainya	
1980-81	Suresh Urs	Mooru Daarigalu	
1979-80	P. Bhakthavathsalam	Minchina Ota	
1978-79	P. Bhakthavathsalam	Shankar Guru	
1976-77	Bal G. Yadav	Kakana Kote	
1975-76	P. Bhakthavathsalam	Premada Kanike	
1974-75	V. P. Krishnan	Upasane	
1973-74	Bal G. Yadav	Gandhada Gudi	
1972-73	Umesh Kulakarni	Sankalpa	
1971-72 †	Aruna Desai	Vamsha Vriksha	
1971-72 †	P. Bhakthavathsalam	Bangaarada Manushya	
1970-71	P. Bhakthavathsalam	Kula Gourava	
1969-70	S. P. N. Krishna	Karulina Kare	
1968-69	S. P. N. Krishna	Margadarshi	
1967-68	V. P. Krishnan	Belli Moda	

== See also ==
- Cinema of Karnataka
- List of Kannada-language films
