= Irulum Oliyum =

1971 film by Puttanna Kanagal

- Poster
- Directed by: Puttanna Kanagal
- Screenplay by: Puttanna Kanagal; Vietnam Veedu Sundaram (dialogues)
- Story by: Aryamba Pattabhi
- Produced by: G. S. Mani; N. Nagasubramaniam; M. V. M. Azhagappa
- Starring: Vanisri; A. V. M. Rajan
- Cinematography: S. Maruti Rao
- Edited by: M. Umanath
- Music by: K. V. Mahadevan
- Production company: Producers Combines
- Release date: 10 September 1971
- Running time: 141 minutes
- Country: India
- Language: Tamil

Irulum Oliyum (transl. The Darkness and the Light) is a 1971 Indian Tamil-language film, directed and co-written by Puttanna Kanagal. A remake of his own Kannada film Kappu Bilupu (1969), itself based on a novel by Aryamba Pattabhi, it stars Vanisri in dual roles with A. V. M. Rajan and R. Muthuraman. The film revolves around two look-alike cousin sisters who switch places for a few days to escape from their respective problems. It was released on 10 September 1971 and became a commercial success.

== Cast ==
- Vanisri as Banu and Chandra
- A. V. M. Rajan as Thyagu
- R. Muthuraman as Ramu
- S. V. Ranga Rao as Mohanarangam, Banu's father
- Nagesh as Mohanarangam's assistant
- S. V. Subbaiah as Dharmalingam, Chandra's father
- Rama Prabha as Rama, Chandra's step-sister
- M. S. Sundari Bai as Amritham, Chandra's stepmother
- Senthamarai as Nagalingam, Amritham's brother
- V. Nagayya as Chandrasekhar, Thyagu's father
- Rukmini as Gowri, Thyagu's mother
- Vennira Aadai Moorthy as Nagalingam's son

== Production ==
Irulum Oliyum was directed by Puttanna Kanagal, who also wrote the screenplay, while Vietnam Veedu Sundaram wrote the dialogues. It is a remake of Kanagal's own Kannada film Kappu Bilupu (1969), itself based on a novel by Aryamba Pattabhi. Cinematography was handled by S. Maruti Rao, and editing by M. Umanath Rao. Ra. Sankaran and Bharathiraja worked as associate directors. The filming was held at Gemini Studios, Ooty and Karnataka.

== Soundtrack ==
Music was by K. V. Mahadevan and lyrics were by Kannadasan.

Song	Singer	Length
"Vaanile Mannile"	P. Susheela	04:45
"Oh Oh Mr Brammachari"	P. Susheela	04:24
"Thirumagal Thedi Vandhaal" — Female	P. Susheela	04:08
"Thirumagal Thedi Vandhaal" — Male	S. P. Balasubrahmanyam, B. Vasantha	03:09
Party Dance	Instrumental	02:26

== Release and reception ==
Irulum Oliyum was released on 10 September 1971, and fared well at the box office. Vanisri won the Chennai Film Fans' Association Award for Best Actress.
