= Kanagal =

Kanagal may refer to:

- Kanagal, Mysore, a village in Karnataka state, India
- Kanagal, Nalgonda, a mandal in Telangana state, India
