= M. K. Indira =

Indian writer (1917-94)

- Born: Mandagadde Krishnarao Indira; 5 January 1917; Thirthahalli, Kingdom of Mysore, British India
- Died: 15 March 1994 (aged 77)
- Occupation: Writer
- Spouse: Krishna Rao
- Writing career
- Notable works: Phaniyamma, Gejje Pooje

Mandagadde Krishnarao Indira (5 January 1917 – 15 March 1994) was a well-known Indian novelist in the Kannada language. Her works include Phaniyamma, which won various awards. She began writing novels at the age of forty-five. Some of her novels were made into movies.

== Early life and education ==
Indira was born on 5 January 1917 to T. Suryanarayana Rao, a prosperous agriculturist and Banashankaramma in Thirthahalli, in the Kingdom of Mysore of British India. Her native village was Narasimharajapura in Chikmagalur district.

Her formal education lasted for seven years, before she married at age twelve to M. Krishna Rao. She studied Kannada poetry and also had a good knowledge of Hindi literature. As said in one of her books, Indira met renowned writer Triveni when she was in Mandya. Triveni appreciated her writing skills, which motivated her to write stories and novels, and then publish them in print media. She ventured into writing novels at age 45.

== Career ==
Her first published novel was Tungabhadra, released in 1963. This was followed by Sadananda (1965), Gejje Pooje (1966) and Navaratna (1967). Her most well-known work is however Phaniyamma, which was released in 1976. Phaniyamma is a novel based on the life of a child widow whom Indira knew during her childhood. Indira heard the story when the widow narrated it to Indira's mother. This novel has been a subject matter of discussion in many books related to feminism. Indira has written more than fifty novels.

Gejje Pooje was made into a film by director Puttanna Kanagal in 1969. Phaniyamma was made into a film by the director Prema Karanth, won many international awards. Indira's other novels made into films are Hoobana (Mutthu ondu Mutthu), Giribale, Musuku and Poorvapara.

== Honors and awards ==
Indira's novels, Tungabhadra, Sadananda, Navaratna and Phaniyamma have won the Kannada Sahitya Akademi awards. This annual award is given to the best Kannada literature of the year. Thejaswini Niranjana has translated Phaniyamma to English, and this translation has won the Sahitya Akademi of India award and more awards. In view of her contribution to literature, an award is constituted in Indira's name and is given to the best women writers. Indiranagar, a neighborhood in Bengaluru, is named after her.

== Novels and Short stories ==
- Sadananda
- Tungabhadra
- Gejjepooje
- Phaniyamma
- Giribale
- Madhuvana
- Mana Tumbida Madadi
- Hennina Akankshe
- Thaapadinda Thampige
- Bramhachari
- Kaladarshi
- Shantidhama
- Navaratna
- Ambarada Apsare
- Nagabeku
- Navajeevana
- Pavaada
- Kalpana Vilasa
- Dashavatara
- Susvagatha
- Baadigege
- Kathegara
- Abharana
- Mane Kottu Nodi
- Kanyakumari
- Rasavaahini
- Naagaveena
- Aathmasakhi
- Doctor
- Tapovanadalli
- Chidvilasa
- Jaathi Kettavalu
- Sukhaanta
- Yaru Hithavaru
- Hoobana
- Puttanna Kanagal
- Varnaleele
- Hasivu
- Bidige Chandrama Donku
- Koopa
- Koochu Bhatta
- Jaala
- Gunda
- Musuku
- Kavalu
- Mohanamaale
- Anubhava Kunja
- Noorondu Baagilu
- Taggina Mane Seethe
- Poorvapara
- Hamsagana
- Thaalidavaru
- Manomandira
- Vichitra Prema
- Onde Nimisha
- Pournami
- Bhaava Bandhana

== Movies based on Indira's novels ==
Movie	Language	Based on
Gejje Pooje	Kannada	Gejje Pooje
Sadananda	Kannada || Sadananda	
Phaniyamma	Kannada	Phaniyamma
Muthu Ondu Muthu	Kannada	Hoobaana
Jaala	Kannada	Jaala
Giribaale	Kannada	Giribaale
Musuku	Kannada	Musuku
Noorondu Baagilu	Kannada	Noorondu Baagilu
Kalyana Mandapam	Telugu	Gejje Pooje
Ahista Ahista	Hindi	Gejje Pooje
Laaga Chunari Mein Daag	Hindi	Gejje Pooje
Thaaliya Salangaiya	Tamil	Gejje Pooje
Poorvapara	Kannada	Poorvapara

== Personal life ==
She died at the age of 77. M K Indira is younger sister of journalist T S Ramachandra Rao, better known as TSR of Choobaana (ಛೂಬಾಣ).

== Sources ==
- Susie J. Tharu, Ke Lalita (1991). Women Writing in India: 600 B.C. to the Present. Feminist Press. ISBN 1-55861-029-4.
- Barbara Koenig Quart (1988). Women Directors: The Emergence of a New Cinema. Praeger/Greenwood. ISBN 0-275-93477-2.
