= Poochakkanni =

- Directed by: Puttanna Kanagal
- Screenplay by: Thikkurissy Sukumaran Nair
- Story by: Triveni
- Produced by: A. L. Sreenivasan; P. Arunachalam
- Starring: Prem Nazir; Adoor Bhasi; Thikkurissy Sukumaran Nair; Vijaya Nirmala
- Cinematography: P. Ellappa
- Edited by: R. Devarajan
- Music by: M. S. Baburaj
- Production company: ALS Productions
- Distributed by: ALS Productions
- Release date: 28 October 1966
- Country: India
- Language: Malayalam

Poochakkanni (also written Poocha Kanni) is a 1966 Indian Malayalam-language film, directed by Puttanna Kanagal and produced by A. L. Sreenivasan and P. Arunachalam. The film stars Prem Nazir, Adoor Bhasi, Thikkurissy Sukumaran Nair and Vijaya Nirmala. The film is based on the Kannada novel Bekkina Kannu by Triveni. The film's score was composed by M. S. Baburaj.

== Cast ==
- Prem Nazir
- Adoor Bhasi
- Thikkurissy Sukumaran Nair
- Vijaya Nirmala
- Bahadoor
- Kalavathi
- Meena
- Usharani

== Soundtrack ==
The music was composed by M. S. Baburaj with lyrics by Vayalar Ramavarma. The singer Prema has spoken about recording a song for the movie.

No.	Song	Singers	Lyrics	Length (m:ss)
1	"Geethe Hridayasakhi"	P. B. Sreenivas	Vayalar Ramavarma	
2	"Ithiriyillaatha Kunje"	Kamukara	Vayalar Ramavarma	
3	"Kakka Kondu"	P. B. Sreenivas, B. Vasantha	Vayalar Ramavarma	
4	"Kurinjippooche"	L. R. Eeswari	Vayalar Ramavarma	
5	"Maramaaya Maramokke"	Chorus, Prema	Vayalar Ramavarma	
6	"Muralee Muralee Nin"	P. Susheela	Vayalar Ramavarma	
7	"Pandoru Raajyathe"	S. Janaki	Vayalar Ramavarma	
