= Aryamba Pattabhi =

Indian novelist

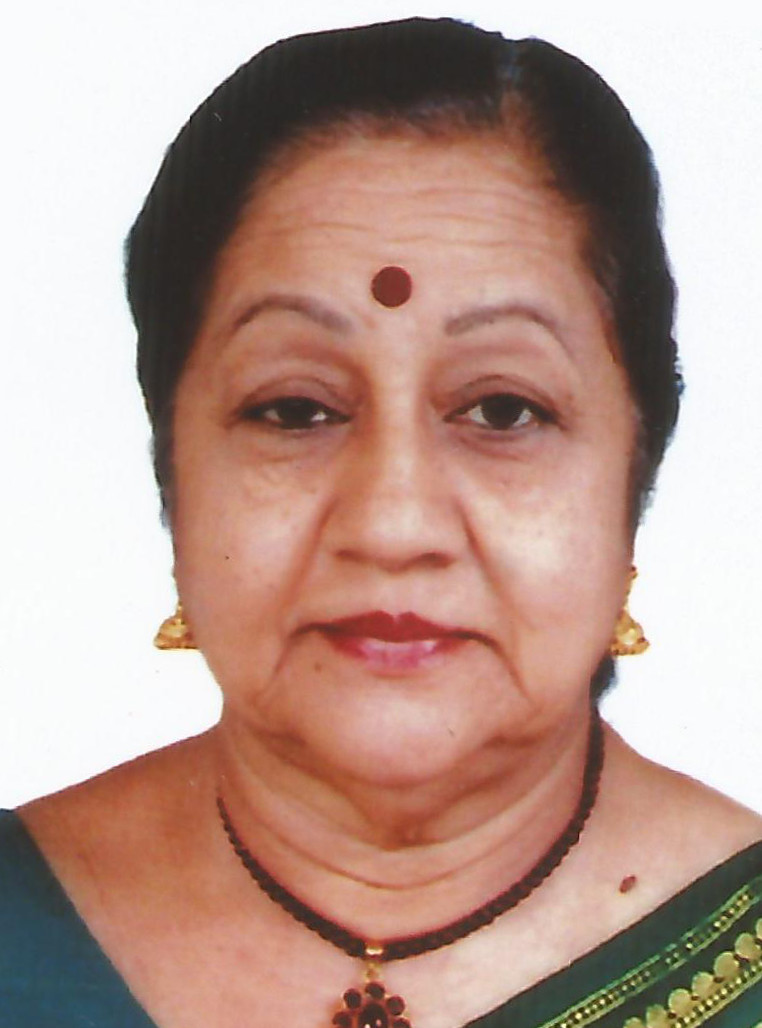
- Born: 12 March 1936; Mandya, Karnataka, British India
- Occupation: Novelist
- Spouse: Pattabhi Ramaiah
- Children: 2
- Relatives: Triveni (sister); B. M. Srikantaiah (uncle); Vani (aunt)
- Writing career
- Language: Kannada
- Period: 1955– Present
- Genres: Biographies, Sports, Fiction on Family Dramas, Romance, Psychological/ Mental Illness, Social Stigma, Feminism
- Notable works: Kappu-Bilipu, Eradu Mukha, Savathiya Neralu, Marali Gudige
- Movement: Kannada Sahitya Dalita Bandaya

Aryamba Pattabhi (born 12 March 1936) is an Indian novelist and writer in Kannada language. She was the younger sister of Triveni, a popular Kannada novelist and the niece of B. M. Srikantaiah, a famous Kannada poet, writer and translator.

Her novels have been made into feature films, most prominently, Kappu Bilupu (1969), directed by Puttanna Kanagal and made into three south Indian languages Kannada, Telugu and Tamil, Eradu Mukha (1969) directed by M.R.Vittal and won the Karnataka State Award and best picture award from Madras Film Lovers Association, Savathiya Neralu (1978) directed by Y.R.Swamy and Marali Gudige (1984) directed by Shantharam and won the State Award. Her novel Parampare was selected and published by the Government of Karnataka in 1985.

== Early life ==
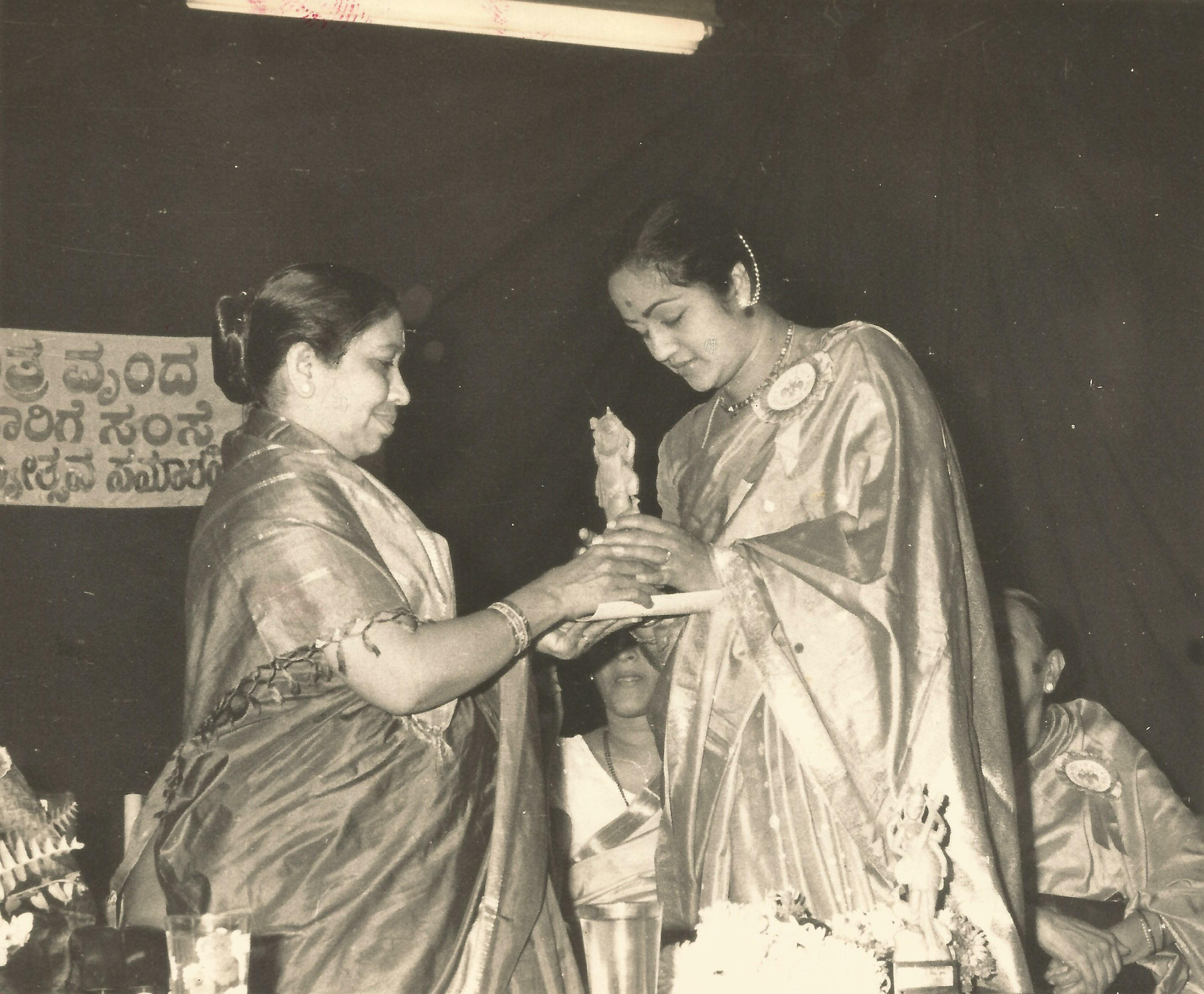
Aryamba in early days

Aryamba is the youngest daughter of B.M Krishnaswamy and Thangamma. Krishnaswamy was the younger brother of B. M. Srikantaiah, the doyen of Kannada literature. Aryamba was born on March 12, 1936, in Mandya, in the erstwhile Kingdom of Mysore of British India (in present-day Mysore, Karnataka). Aryamba comes from an illustrious family of established writers. Her uncle B. M. Srikantaiah was a renowned scholar and poet, whose translations are present in university texts all over the world. Her aunt Vani was a popular novelist. She had two sisters including famous novelist Triveni and four brothers.

Aryamba completed her Master of Arts (MA) in Sociology, from Mysore University.

== Career ==
Over the course of several years, she has published 32 novels, 5 short story collections, 12 books for children, 5 biographies (including one on Mother Teresa whom she interviewed), 6 dramas, 3 essays, and 1 on sports literature. 2015

Aryamba conducted research for several of her biographies, including interviewing Mother Teresa when she had visited Mysore. Like her sister, she began to write fiction at a time when there were very few female writers in Kannada.

Her Eradu Mukha won Karnataka State Award and best picture award from Madras Film Lovers Association. Marali gudige won the State Award. Parampare novel (1985) was selected and published by Government of Karnataka. Bharathada Mahapurusharu was prescribed as the non detailed text book by Karnataka University, IInd PUC for 2 years (1977–1978). Some parts of the book were published in the text book of 10th standard - Karnataka and Kerala state schools. All six of her dramas have been broadcast from Mysuru and Bengaluru A.I.R, stations. She has presented at several literary state seminars throughout Mysore and Bangalore, presented her work on the All India Radio stations, won several awards and felicitations, had her work published in several daily, weekly and monthly Kannada magazines and papers, and is the founder of several organizations. She was the chief editor of "Mahila Sahithya Sameekshe" and "Sahithya Vimarshe".

Four novels have been made into films and several short stories have been translated into Marathi.

=== Novels ===
- Honganasu 1961
- Aradhane 1962
- Priyasangama 1964
- Eradu Mukha 1965
- Kappu Bilupu 1965
- Beesida Bale 1966
- Marali Gudige 1966
- Badukina Bavaneyalli 1967
- Savathiya neralu 1967
- Baduku 1968
- Bevu-Bella 1969
- Atthu Nagisidaga 1972
- Devamanava 1972
- Saakshathkara 1975
- Parampare 1976
- Kasturi 1977
- Premakathe 1978
- Asangatha 1980
- Kamanabillu 1981
- Kunike 1982
- Narabhakshaka 1987
- Vishwadharma 1987
- Prakruthi Purusha 1987
- Sambandhagalu + suli 1999
- Basavi 2000
- Sakumaga + Guri 2002
- Apporva kathe + Bandaya 2004
- Budhimandyathe 2012
- Arohana 2018

=== Collection of Short stories ===
- Marali Banda Mamathe 1968
- Udayaravi 1968
- Nannavalu 1970
- Tere Saridaga 2000
- "Aryamba pattabhi awara Samagra Kathasankalana" (Fifty five short stories) – 2002.

=== Films based on her novels ===
- Kappu-Bilipu
- Eradu Mukha
- Savathiya Neralu
- Marali gudige

=== Books For Children ===
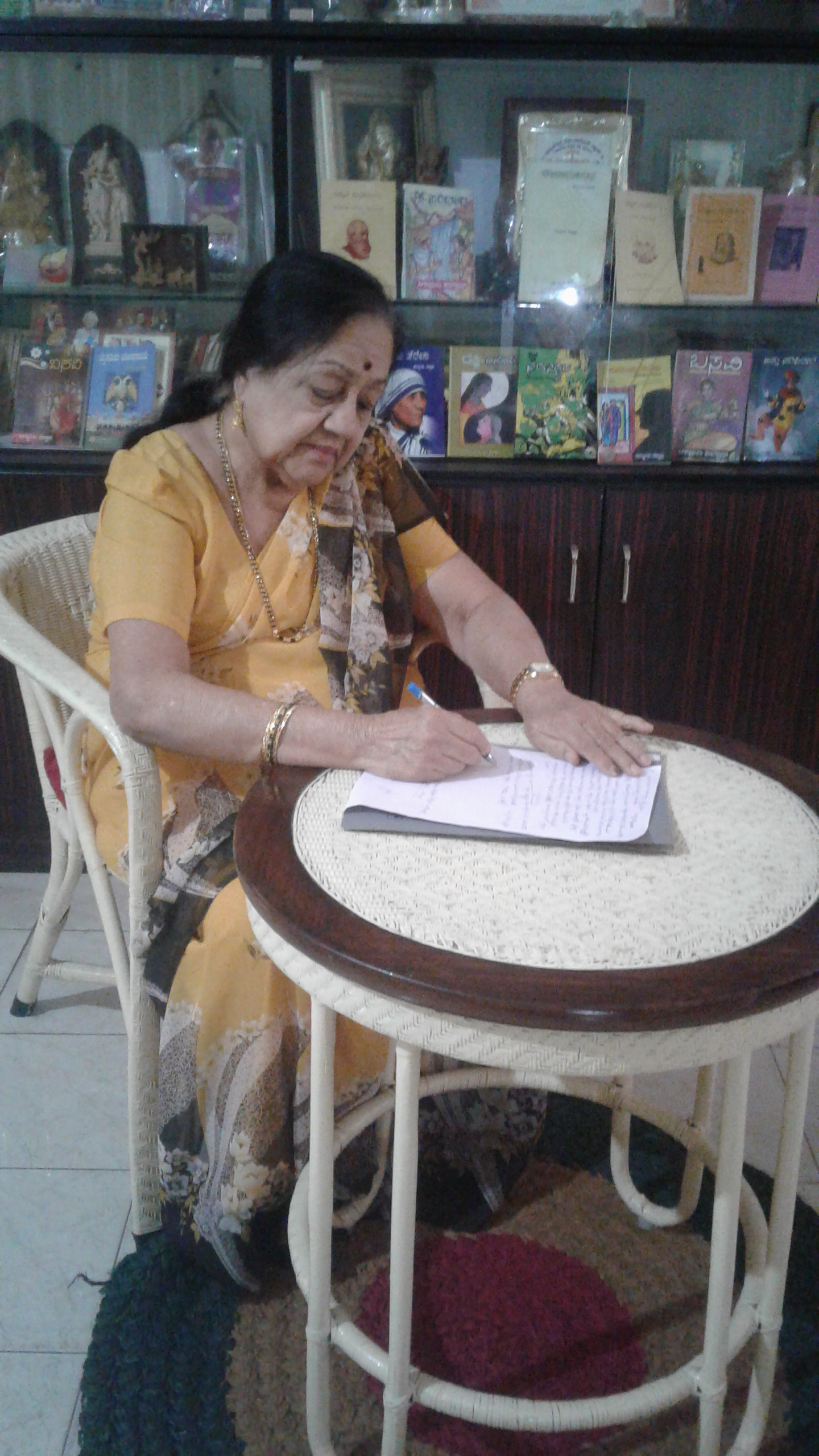
Aryamba writing

- Ranadheera Kanteerava Narasimha Raja Odeyar 1975
- Nalwadi Krishna Raja Odeyar 1975
- Ravindranath Tagore 1987
- Thayi Theresa 1987
- Habbagalu 1987
- Cha.Vasudeviah 1987
- Vignana Sadhakaru Part –1,2,3,4 1991
- Marie Curie 1997
- Triveni 2002

=== Biographies ===
- Bharatada Mahapurusharu 1975
- Thayi Theresa 1985
- Mother Teresa 2000(English)
- Mysuru Maharajaru 2016
- Vishwa Vignanigalu 2017

=== Dramas ===
- Salu deepa
- Bekkina Kannu
- Belakinattha
- Dudidavane Doddappa
- Sakumaga
- Kasthuri

=== Sports Literature ===
- Tennis - 1987 (Detailed Study on the game of tennis – published by the University of Mysore in 1983, revised edition in 2011)

=== Essays ===
- Mahile, Ondu Adhyayana 1998
- Lekhanubandha 2004
- Sthree, Samasye – Saadhane 2018

== Personal life ==
Aryamba married Rajendrapura Pattabhi Ramaiah in 1958. Her hobbies include tennis, table tennis, chess and collecting world stamps and coins.

== Awards ==
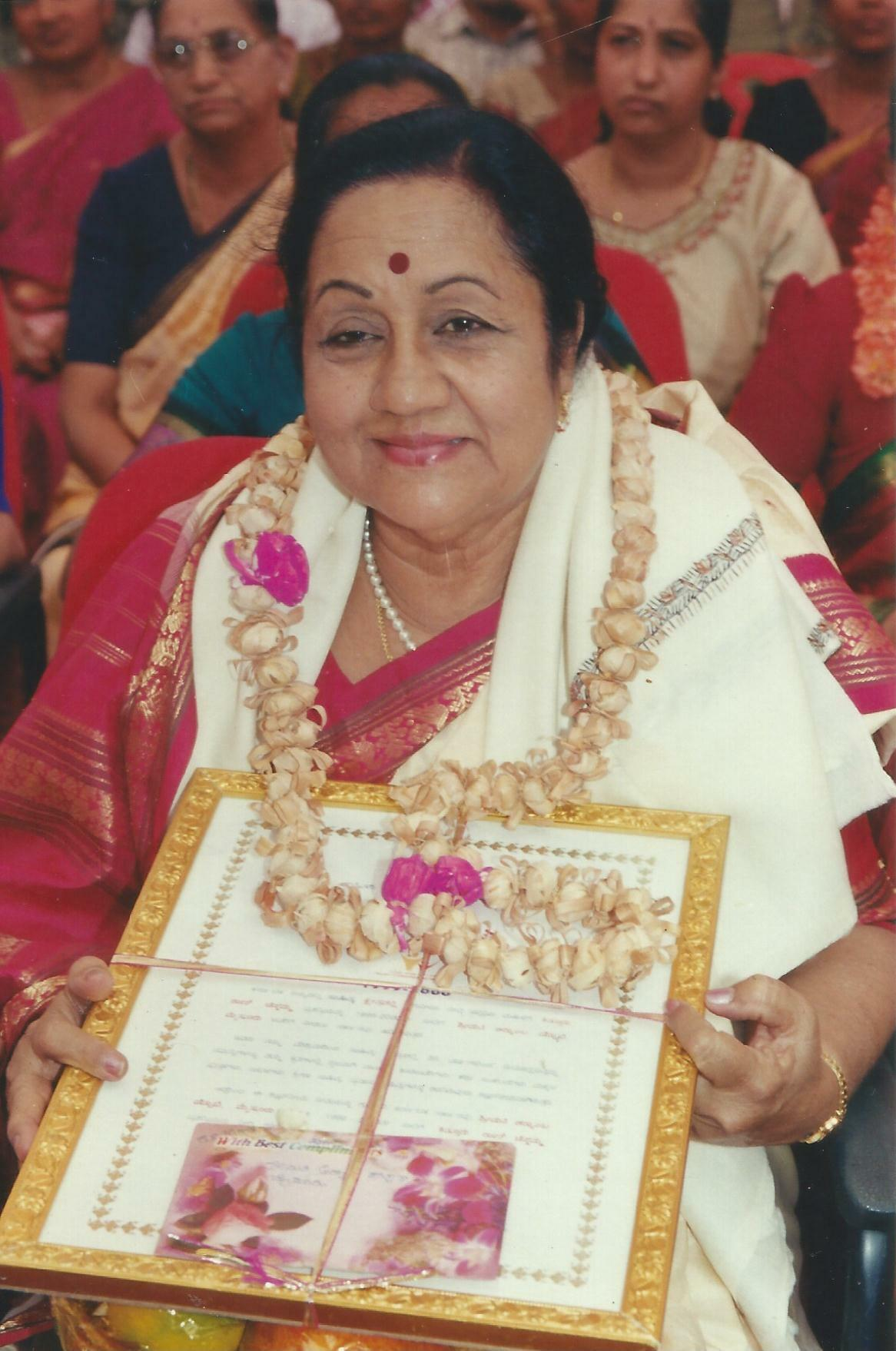
Receiving Award

=== State Awards ===
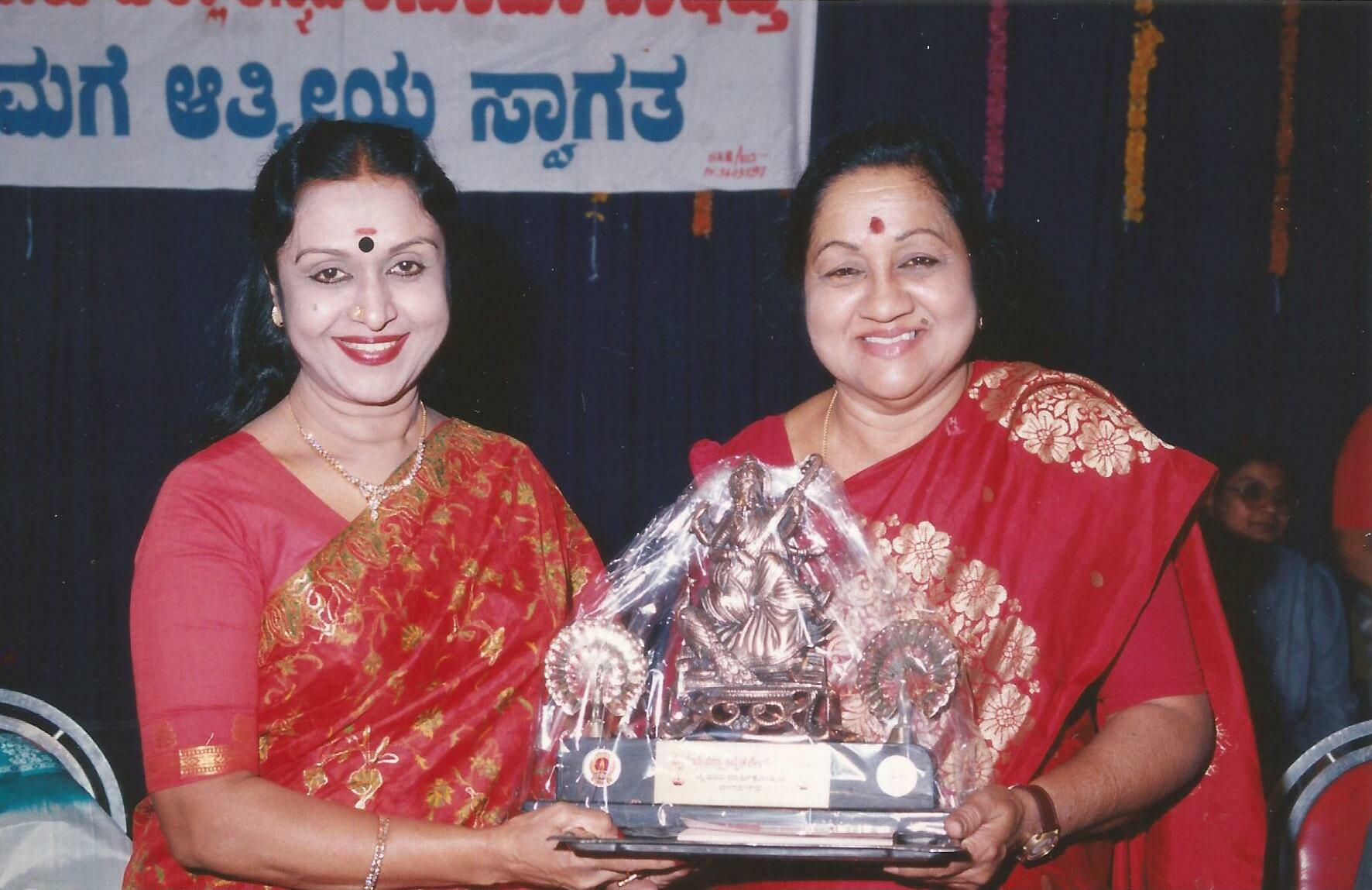
Saroja Devi presenting an award to Aryamba

- "Mallika Prashasthi" for 'Tennis' Kannada Sahithya Parishath – 1989.
- "Attimabe prashasthi" – Attimabe Prathistana Trust, Bengaluru -1996
- "Karnataka Sahithya Academy Award" – Book Prize for 'Videsha Pravasa' 1997.
- "Lingaraj Sahithya Prashasthi" – for 'Videsha Pravasa' – Best Book of the year – 1997.
- "Kannada Lekhakiyara Parishat Prashasthi" – For 'Videsha Pravasa Grantha' in the year 1997.
- "Sir.M.Vishvesvaraiah Navarathna Prashasthi" – 'Bharatharathna Sir.M.Vishvesvaraiah' Engineering Prathistana, Bengaluru 1998
- "Karnataka chethana prashasthi" – 'Kannada Patrika Kala Sanskriti Vedike' Bengaluru 1999
- "Srimathi Savithramma Deja Gou Mahila Sahithya Prashasthi" – DejaGou Trust, Mysuru 1999.
- "Kitturu Rani Chennama Prashasthi"(Literature) – Women and Child Development Department, Karnataka Government 2000.
- "Karnataka Sahithya Academy GOWRAVA Prashasti" Karnataka Sahithya Academy 2000.
- "Unmilana Abhinandana Grantha Samarpane" (State Felicitation Samithi) from state writers - 2002.
- "Smt B S Chandrakala Swara Lipi Prashasti and Lipi Pragne Title" Gayana Samaja, Bengaluru 2003.
- "Sir.M.Vishvesvaraiah Sahithya Prashasti" Sahithya Kshethra, Mysuru 2003.
- "Karnataka Vibhushana Rajya Prashasthi" Karnataka Janatha Sevadala, Bengaluru 2003.
- "Adarsha Seva Rathna Prashasti" – Adarsha Seva Sangha, Mysuru 2006
- "Padmabhushana Dr.B.Sarojadevi Sahithya Prashasthi" Kannada Sahithya Parishath, Bengaluru 2009.
- "Sanchi Honamma Prashasthi" – Amba Prakashana, Yelanduru - 2009
- "Aryabhatta Anthararashtriya Sahithya Prashasthi" – Aryabhatta Sanskrithika Samsthe, Bengaluru 2009.
- "Amma Prashasthi" – Geetharaj Foundation, Mysuru 2012.
- "Vidyaranya Prashasthi" (Sahithya) Vidyaranyapuram Samskruthika Samithi, Mysuru 2014
- "Kannada Rajyothsava Prashasthi" Government of Karnataka (received award from Ex Chief Minister Siddaramaiah ) 2015, Bengaluru.

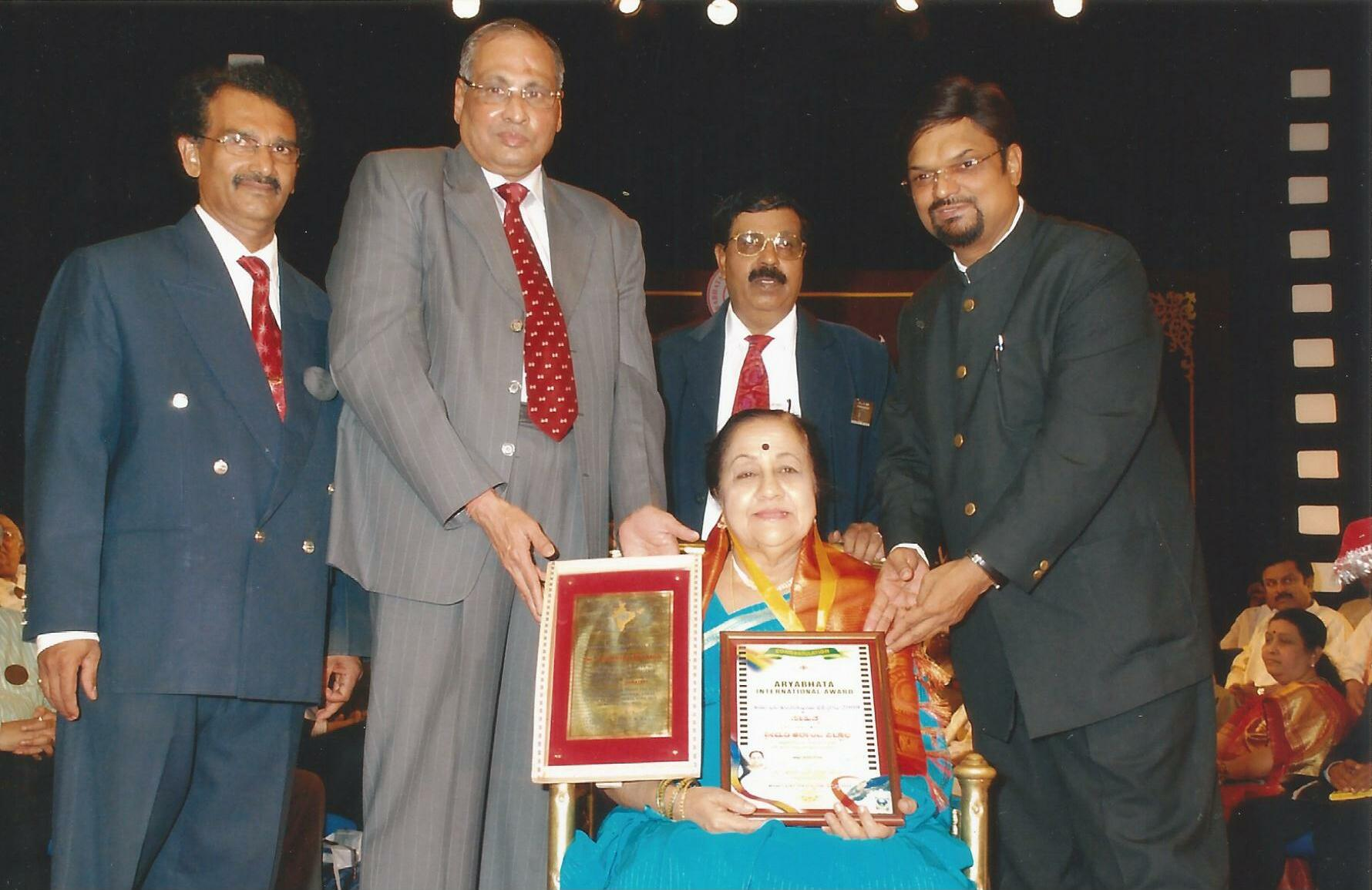
International Award

=== Felicitations ===
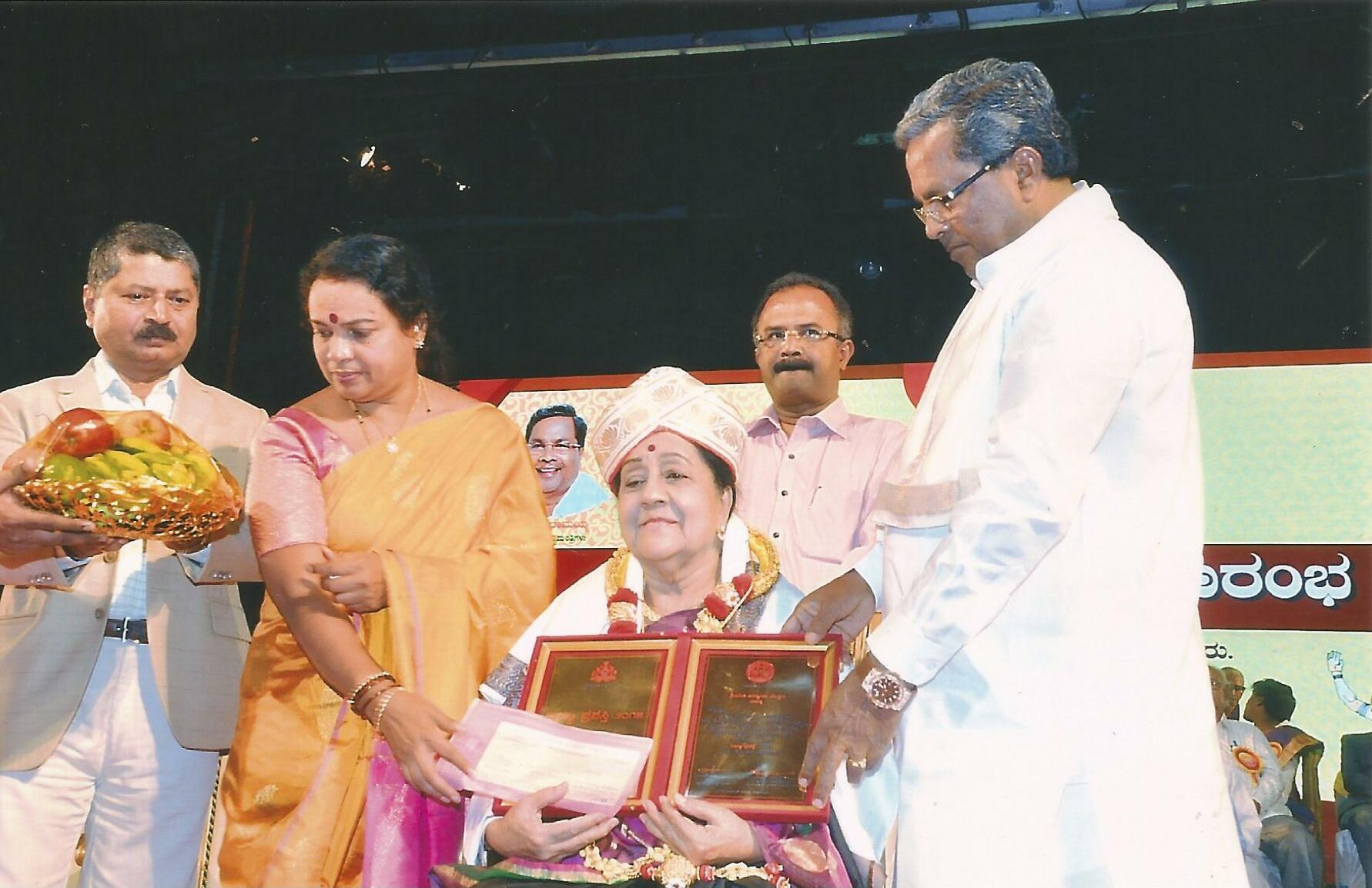
Felicitations

- Bengaluru Transportation Corporation (BTC) -1971
- Mysore Zilla Kannada Cheluvaligarara Sangha - 1975.
- Lekakiyara Sahithya Sammelana, Kannada Sangha, Davanagere -1981.
- Rajyothsava Samaramba, Mandya -1984.
- Dejegow Samskrithika Prathishtana, Mysuru - 1984.
- 4th Akhila Karnataka Lekhakiyara Sahithya Sammelana, Mandya- 1985
- Bramhana Sabha, Mandya- 1992
- Sri. Ganapathi Sachindananda Swamy Ashrama, Mysuru - 1992
- Rotary West, Mysuru -1994
- Babburu Kamme Seva samithi, Bengaluru - 1995.
- BEML Kannada Sangha, Mysuru -1997
- Maharani Arts and Commerce College, Mysuru - 1997
- Girija Kalyanothsava, Srikanteshwara Temple Nanjangud - 1997
- Kannada Samskruthika Samsthe, Vidyaranyapuram, Mysuru - 1997
- Kannada Lekhakiyara Trust, Mysuru - 1997.
- Akhila Karnataka Bramhana Mahasabhe, Prathama Vipra Mahila Sammelana, Bengaluru - 2000
- Sri Anjaneyaswamy Devasthana Trust, Mysuru - 2000
- Sri. Lakshmi Mahila Samaja, Mysuru - 2000
- Sharada Nikethana Hostel, Mysuru, -2000
- Mahila chinthana samavesha, Maddur & Mahila adhyayana vibhaga, Hampi University - 2006
- Vipra Mahila Sangama Trust, Mysuru - 2006.
- Karnataka Janathadala, Bengaluru - 2006
- Arivina mane mahila balaga, Mysuru -2006
- Vipra mahila vedike, Piriyapatna - 2007
- Prajapitha Bramhakumari Eshwari Vidyalaya, Mysuru - 2009
- The Institute of Engineers, Mysuru - 2009
- Bramhana Mahila Vedike, Mysuru - 2012.
- The Graduate Co-operative Bank, Mysuru in the year 2014.
- Sahakara sangha, Srirangapatna - 2016

=== Felicitations in the Year 2015 ===
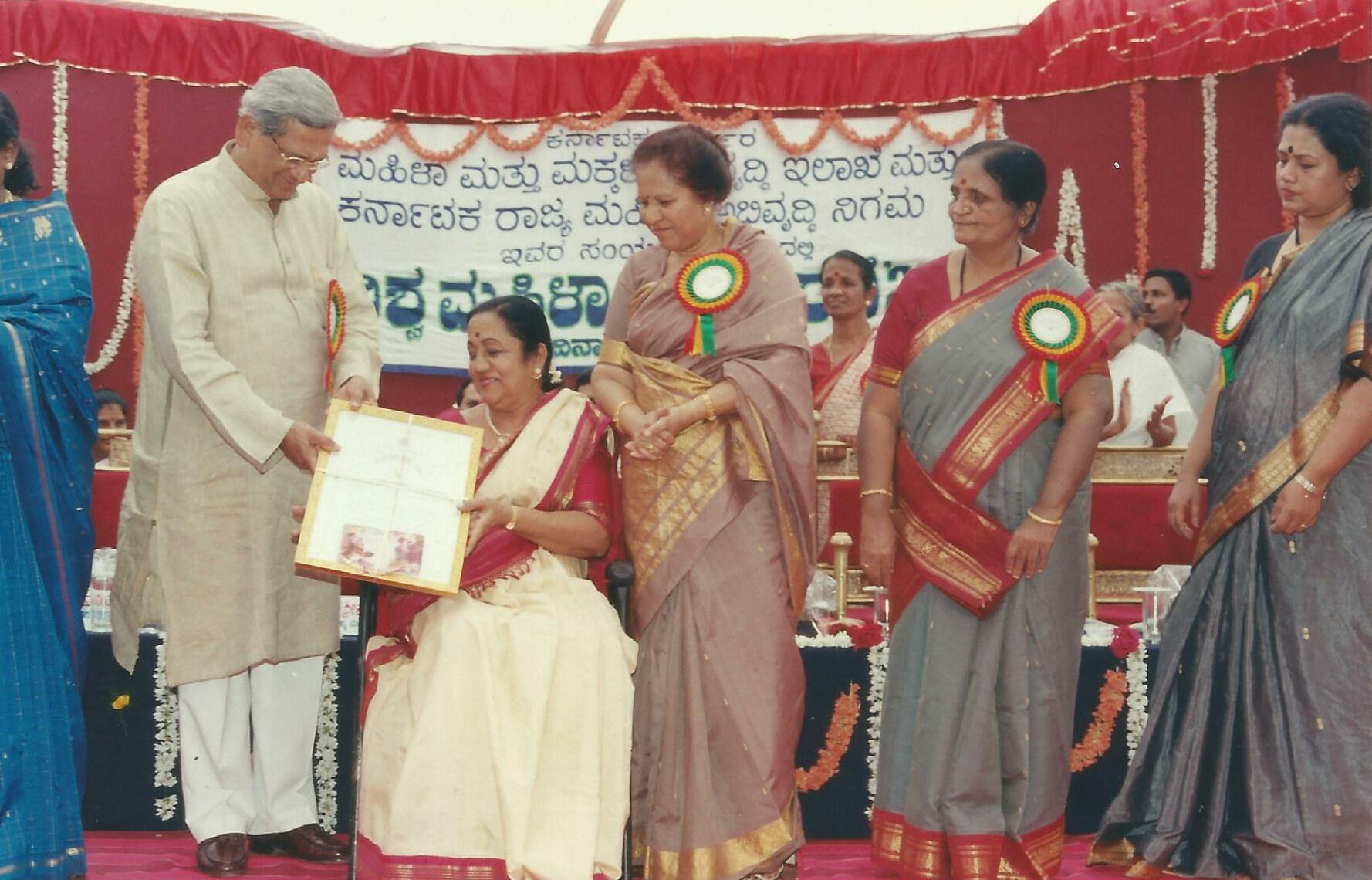
Award Function

- Koutilya University
- T.T.L.College
- Cosmopolitan Club
- Kadamba Ranga vedike
- Kannada Odhugara okkuta
- Bankers Recreation Club
- Sankalpa Manimandira Apartment
- Kannada Sahithya Kala Koota and Kalpavrukhsa Trust
- Vismaya Prakashana
- Samvahana Samskruthika Trust
- Githa Shishu Shikshana Sangha
- Writers from Mandya
- State Bank of Mysore
- Sri Lakshmi Mahila Society
- Institute of Engineers
- Mysuru Chess Association
- Babburu Kamme Yashaswini Mahila Sangha

== Presentations in Literary State Seminars ==
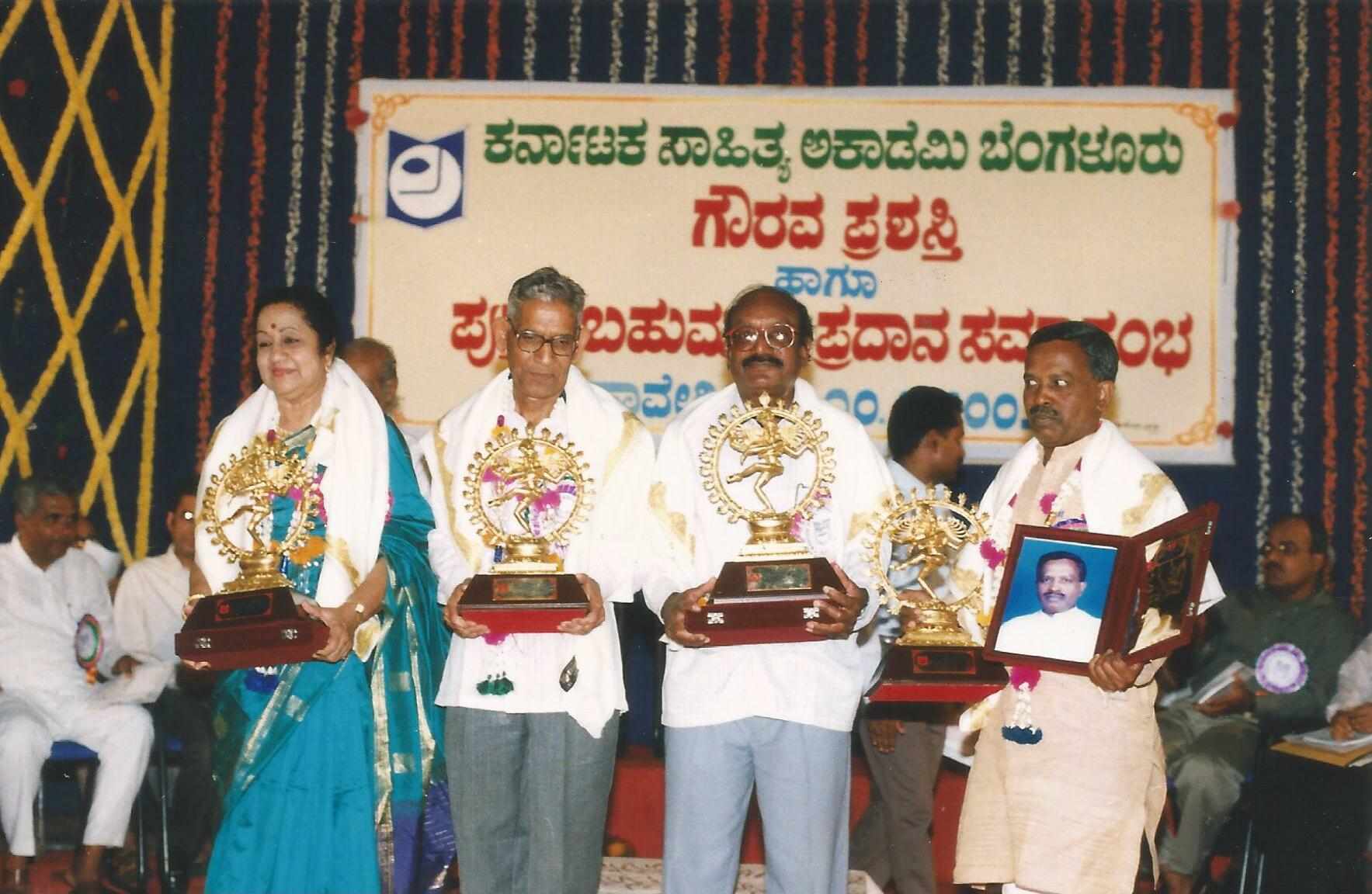
Literary Presentations

- Vichara Gosti, Kannada Lekakiyara Sangha, Bengaluru-1967.
- Ramamurthy Kannada Mithra Sangha, Bengaluru -1970.
- District Sahithya Sammelana, Hassan – 1971.
- 48th Akila Kannada Sahitya Sasmmelana, Mysuru -1974.
- Third Akila Karnataka Women Writers Sammelana, Tumkur-1984.
- Fifth District Sahithya Sammelana, Chikkamagalur – 1984.
- Chaithrothsava, Kannada Sahithya Parishat, Hubli – 1984.
- Fourth Akhila Karnataka Women Writers Sammelana, Mandya-1985.
- Sarvadharma and Sahithya Sammelana, 59th Adiveshana, Dharmasthala – 1988.
- Vasantha Sahithyothsava, Kannada Sahithya Parishat, Pandavapura – 1988.
- Second State Level Lekakiyara Sammelana, Kannada Sahithya Parishat, Bengaluru -1990.
- Akila Karnataka Lekakiyara Sammelana, Davanagere- 1990.
- Karnataka State Makkala Sahitya Vedike, Bengaluru-1991.
- President of Mysuru District Lekakiyara Sammelana, Mysuru – 8 and 9 March 1992.
- Mysuru District Sahitya Sammelana, T.Narasipur – 1993
- Akila Karnataka Lekakiyara Sammelana, Davanagere-1993.
- Suvarna Mahotsava, Kannada Lekakiyara Sangha, Bengaluru-1993.
- First Mysore City, Brahmins Sammelana – 1994.
- Mahila Samvada Gosti, Mysuru-2001.
- Akka‟ Rastriya Mahila Natakothsava, Mysuru-2001.
- Mandya District Sixth Kannada Sahithya Sammelana, Bengaluru-2003.
- Karnataka Reshme Udyamigala Nigama Kendra, Bengaluru-2009.
- Karnataka Sahitya Academy „Rajyothsava‟ – 2010.
- B.M.Shri- Ondu Nenapu‟, Mysore University – 2011.
- B.Nanjamma Book release function, Bengaluru -2014.
- Kavitha Smaraka Prashasti Pradhana and book release function by Yashoda Ragow trust – 2015.

=== Talks ===
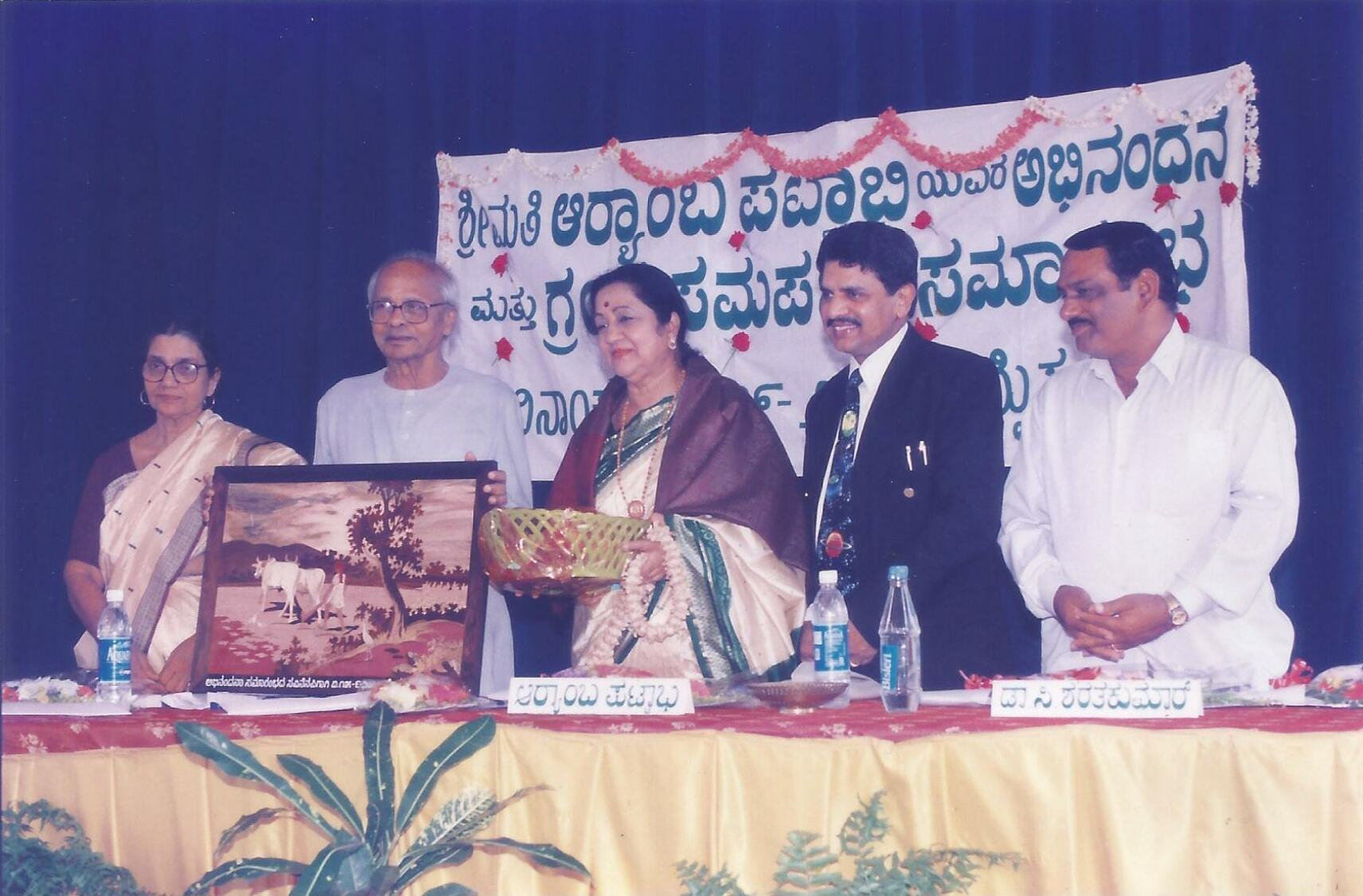
Aryamba Talk

- Chintanagalu (around 15, all major Hindu festivals)
- Bekkina Kannu(Triveni's novel) broadcast in - 1998
- Smt Vani interview – 1980.
- Participated in the programme – "Triveni Ondu Nenapu"
- Twenty five short stories
- Talk on "Mother Teresa"
- One hour interview by Dr.H.P.Geetha

== Organizations ==
- Publisher, Poornima Prakashana, Mysuru
- Ex- President, Kannada Lekhakiyara Trust, Mysuru
- President, Mahila Dhyana Vidyapeeta, Mysuru.
- Founder member, C.N.Jayalakshmidevi trust, Mysuru.
- Life member, Kannada Sahitya Parishat,
- Founder, President – Women's Sports Club.
- Ex-president, old students Association, Maharani‟s Arts and Commerce college, Mysuru.
- Ex-member, Book Selection Committee, State Library, Bengaluru.
