= Karnataka State Film Award for Best Music Director =

Indian film award

Karnataka State Film Award for Best Music Direction
- State award for contributions to Kannada cinema
- Awarded for: Best Music Direction for Songs / Background Music
- Sponsored by: Government of Karnataka
- Rewards: Silver Medal; ₹20,000
- First award: 1967-68
- Final award: 2021
- Most recent winner: Imtiaz Sultan

Highlights
- Total awarded: 50
- First winner: Vijaya Bhaskar

Karnataka State Film Award for Best Music Director is a film award of the Indian state of Karnataka given during the annual Karnataka State Film Awards. The award honours music directors for their work in Kannada language films.

== Superlative winners ==
• Vijaya Bhaskar	6 Awards
• Hamsalekha • M. Ranga Rao • Upendra Kumar • V. Manohar	3 Awards

== Winners ==
The following is a partial list of award winners and the name of the films for which they won.

=== Key ===
Symbol	Meaning
	Indicates winner for Best Background Score

Year	Image	Recipient(s)	Film	Refs.
2021	–	Imtiaz Sultan	Bisilu Kudure	
2020	–	Gagan Baderia	Malgudi Days	
2019	–	V. Harikrishna	Yajamana	
2018		Ravi Basrur	K.G.F: Chapter 1	
2017	–	V. Harikrishna	Raajakumara	
2016		Charan Raj	Jeerjimbe	
2015	–	Sridhar V. Sambhram	Krishna Leela	
2014	–	B. Ajaneesh Loknath	Ulidavaru Kandanthe	
2013		Poornachandra Tejaswi	Lucia	
2012	–	Arjun Janya	Alemaari	
2011	–	Anoop Seelin	Sidlingu	
2010–11	–	Jayashree Aravind	Ondooralli	
2009–10	–	This Award is taken back		
2008–09		Abhiman Roy	Tajmahal	
2007–08		Sadhu Kokila	Inthi Ninna Preethiya	
2006–07		Mano Murthy	Mungaaru Male	
2005–06		Hamsalekha	Nenapirali	
2004–05		Sadhu Kokila	Rakshasa	
2003–04		V. Manohar	Chigurida Kanasu	
2002–03	–	Stephen Prayog	Paris Pranaya	
2001–02		V. Ravichandran	Ekangi	
2000–01	–	N. Govardhan	Mahalakshmi	
1999–2000		K. Kalyan	Chandramukhi Pranasakhi	
1998–99	–	No Award	N/A	
1997–98		V. Manohar	Jodi Hakki	
1996–97		V. Manohar	Janumada Jodi	
1995–96		Hamsalekha	Sangeetha Sagara Ganayogi Panchakshara Gavai	
1994–95		Hamsalekha	Haalunda Thavaru	
1993–94		C. Ashwath	Chinnari Mutha	
1992–93	–	Upendra Kumar	Jeevana Chaitra	
1991–92	–	Vijaya Bhaskar	Pathitha Pavani	
1989–90	–	Vijaya Bhaskar	Muraligaana Amruthapaana	
1988–89	–	Upendra Kumar	Nanjundi Kalyana	
1987–88	–	L. Vaidyanathan (Note: This movie does not have any songs. It is the first Silent film of Modern Indian Cinema. This award for Background Score only.)	Pushpaka Vimana	
1986–87	–	No award	N/A	
1985–86	–	G. K. Venkatesh	Hosa Neeru	
1984–85	–	M. Ranga Rao	Bandhana	
1983–84	–	Vijaya Bhaskar	Dharani Mandala Madhyadolage	
1982–83		Rajeev Taranath	Shrungara Maasa	
1981–82	–	M. Ranga Rao	Hosa Belaku	
1980–81		Chandrashekhara Kambara	Sangeetha	
1978–79	–	Rajan–Nagendra	Parasangada Gendethimma	
1977–78		C. Ashwath	Spandana	
1976–77		Rajeev Taranath	Pallavi	
1975–76	–	B. V. Karanth	Hamsageethe	
1975–76		M. Balamuralikrishna	Hamsageethe	
1974–75	–	G. K. Venkatesh	Bhakta Kumbara	
1973–74	–	Rajan–Nagendra	Eradu Kanasu	
1972–73	–	Vijaya Bhaskar	Sankalpa	
1971–72	–	Vijaya Bhaskar	Yaava Janmada Maitri	
1970–71		Salil Chowdhary	Samshaya Phala	
1969–70	–	T. G. Lingappa	Sri Krishnadevaraya	
1968–69	–	M. Ranga Rao	Hannele Chiguridaga	
1967–68	–	Vijaya Bhaskar	Belli Moda	

== See also ==
- Cinema of Karnataka
- List of Kannada-language films
