= Chettathi =

- Directed by: S. R. Puttanna Kanagal
- Screenplay by: S. R. Puttanna Kanagal
- Story by: S. L. Puram Sadanandan
- Produced by: P A Thangal
- Starring: Sathyan; Thikkurissy Sukumaran Nair; Prem Nazeer; Ambika (old); Adoor Bhasi; Sukumari
- Cinematography: N. S. Mani
- Edited by: V. P. Krishnan
- Music by: M. S. Baburaj
- Distributed by: Central Pictures Release
- Release date: 26 November 1965
- Country: India
- Language: Malayalam

Chettathi is a 1965 Malayalam language film. The film was directed by S. R. Puttanna Kanagal, starring Ambika, Sathyan, Nazeer and Thikkurissy Sukumaran Nair in the lead roles. Music of this film was done by M. S. Baburaj. It tells the story of a young widow. The core plot of the movie is partially inspired by Triveni's Kannada novel Hannele Chiguridaga.

== Plot ==
Premachandran is the elder son of Master, Nirmala is his fiancée. Premachandran, who works in a factory in Coimbatore, comes home after a long time for their marriage. Prabhakaran is Premachandran's younger brother who is in love with Vasanthy. After marriage, Premachandran returns to work, leaving Nirmala at his home. Nirmala takes good care of her father-in-law and brother-in-law and gains their love. Meanwhile, Premachandran dies in an accident at work. This devastates the whole family. Gopi, Prabhakarans's colleague who is a womanizer, develops a love interest towards Nirmala and proposes to her. But she declines. Prabhakaran's love and respect towards Nirmala is misunderstood by his father. Nirmala, with a broken heart, leaves home and joins her sister Susheela and husband Viswanathan. Prabhakaran, who refused to marry, gets married at the request of Nirmala. Prabhakaran gets uneasy with his wife's lazy attitude and he begins to complain, comparing each and everything with Nirmala. This creates a problem in his marriage life. Viswanathan approaches Nirmala with the wrong intention, but fails. He tells Susheela that Nirmala tried to entice him. Susheela asks Nirmala to leave the house. She comes back to her husband's home. There she overhears the fight between Prabhakaran and Vasanthy. Knowing that her presence creates problems in everyone's life, she leaves home. Master and Prabhakaran follow her, but they find Nirmala in a disturbed mental state. Soon Nirmala dies.

== Cast ==
- Sathyan as Premachandran
- Prem Nazeer
- Ambika Sukumaran as Nirmala
- Sukumari as Bharathi
- Adoor Bhasi as Bharghavan
- Thikkurissy Sukumaran Nair as Master
- Kottayam Chellappan as Viswanathan
- T. K. Balachandran as Gopi
- Ushakumari as Susheela
- Chithra as Vasanthy
- Prathapachandran as Gopi's Friend

== Soundtrack ==
The music was composed by M. S. Baburaj and the lyrics were written by Vayalar Ramavarma.

No.	Song	Singers	Lyrics	Length (m:ss)
1	"Aadiyil Vachanamundaayi"	K. J. Yesudas	Vayalar Ramavarma	
2	"Ee Premapanchavadiyil"	S. Janaki	Vayalar Ramavarma	
3	"Kannanaamunni Urangu"	S. Janaki	Vayalar Ramavarma	
4	"Pathinaaru Vayassu" (F)	P. Susheela	Vayalar Ramavarma	
5	"Pathinaaru Vayassukazhinjaal"	K. J. Yesudas, Prema	Vayalar Ramavarma	
6	"Veedaayaal Vilakku"	S. Janaki, P. B. Sreenivas	Vayalar Ramavarma	
