= Kappu Bilupu =

- Directed by: Puttanna Kanagal
- Written by: Aryamba Pattabhi
- Screenplay by: Puttanna Kanagal
- Based on: Kappu Bilupu by Aryamba Pattabhi
- Produced by: Ravikumar
- Starring: Kalpana; Balakrishna
- Cinematography: D. V. Rajaram
- Edited by: G. Veluswamy
- Music by: R. Rathna
- Release date: 1969
- Country: India
- Language: Kannada

Kappu Bilupu ( transl. which means Black and White) is a 1969 Indian Kannada language film directed by Puttanna Kanagal. Based on a novel of the same name by Aryamba Pattabhi, this movie revolves around the contrasting behaviuors of two identical twins. The film stars Kalpana in dual roles. Puttanna himself remade the movie in Tamil as Irulum Oliyum and in Telugu as Iddaru Ammayilu.

Puttanna used the movie as a medium for speaking to the youth of the ideals he derived from Vivekananda. The settings are simple and mostly rural. The story is about how domestic peace is better than a glamorously consumptive lifestyle. The juxtaposition of the two sisters played by Kalpana in a black and white background is a clever trick. H R Shastry and Balakrishna play dignified elders who, in many ways, are sympathetic but helpless. There were a couple of simple but moving melodies.

== Cast ==
- Kalpana as Vatsala / Chandra
- Rajesh as Srivatsa
- R. N. Sudarshan
- Balakrishna as Narasimha Murthy
- Advani Lakshmi Devi
- H. R. Shastry
- R. T. Rama
- Kanagal Prabhakara Sastry
- Anantharam Maccheri

== Story ==
A Cinderella-inspired story, the film's plot is a commentary on the ultimate triumph of good character over situational advantages. Kalpana as Vatsala is a poor and docile girl ill-treated by her stepmother. Her second character, identical twin Chandra, is rich, arrogant and bold.

== Soundtrack ==
R. Rathna composed the music for the soundtrack.

Sl No	Song title	Singers	Lyrics
1	"Amma Ninna Tholinalli"	P. Susheela	R. N. Jayagopal
2	"Bhale Brahmachari"	L. R. Eswari	R. N. Jayagopal
3	"Cheluvina Kenneye"	L. R. Eswari	R. N. Jayagopal
4	"Indina Hindu Deshada"	P. B. Srinivas	R. N. Jayagopal
5	"Ee Chandada Maneyalli"	P. Susheela	R. N. Jayagopal
6	"Ide Roopa Ade Nota"	P. B. Srinivas	R. N. Jayagopal

== Remakes ==
The film was remade in 1971 by Puttanna in two languages - in Tamil as Irulum Oliyum and in Telugu as Iddaru Ammayilu.
