= Swapnabhoomi =

- Directed by: S. R. Puttanna
- Written by: Miss. Thriveni; S. L. Puram Sadanandan (dialogues)
- Screenplay by: S. L. Puram Sadanandan
- Produced by: Rangarajan
- Starring: Prem Nazir; Sathyan; Sheela; Kaviyoor Ponnamma
- Cinematography: R. N. K. Prasad
- Edited by: V. P. Krishnan
- Music by: G. Devarajan
- Production company: Sujatha Pictures
- Distributed by: Sujatha Pictures
- Release date: 22 December 1967
- Country: India
- Language: Malayalam

Swapnabhoomi is a 1967 Indian Malayalam-language film directed by S. R. Puttanna and produced by Rangarajan. The film stars Prem Nazir, Sathyan, Sheela and Kaviyoor Ponnamma in the lead roles. The film has musical score by G. Devarajan. The film is a remake of the director's own Kannada film Belli Moda, released the same year.

== Cast ==
- Prem Nazir
- Sathyan
- Sheela
- Kaviyoor Ponnamma
- Adoor Bhasi
- B. N. Nambiar
- Lakshmi

== Soundtrack ==
The music was composed by G. Devarajan and the lyrics were written by Vayalar Ramavarma.

No.	Song	Singers	Lyrics	Length (m:ss)
1	"Aa Kayyil Ee Kayyil"	P. Susheela	Vayalar Ramavarma	
2	"Ezhilam Poomarakkaattil"	P. Susheela	Vayalar Ramavarma	
3	"Madhumathi"	K. J. Yesudas	Vayalar Ramavarma	
4	"Premasarvaswame"	K. J. Yesudas	Vayalar Ramavarma	
5	"Vellichirakulla"	P. Susheela	Vayalar Ramavarma	
