= Ahista Ahista (1981 film) =

- Film poster
- Directed by: Esmayeel Shroff
- Story by: M. K. Indira
- Produced by: Sibte Hassan Rizvi
- Starring: Shammi Kapoor; Nanda; Kunal Kapoor; Padmini Kolhapure; Shashikala; Girish Karnad; Rehman
- Music by: Khayyam
- Release date: 9 October 1981
- Country: India
- Language: Hindi

Ahista Ahista (transl. Slowly Slowly) is a Hindi-language film released on 9 October 1981. The film stars Shammi Kapoor, Nanda, Kunal Kapoor, Padmini Kolhapure, Shashikala, Ashalata Wabgaonkar and Rehman. It is a remake of the Kannada film Gejje Pooje.

== Plot ==
Courtesan Madame Subbalaxmi heads a household where men are not born, but are welcome. Women are not welcome, but their birth is celebrated. Subbalaxmi is thrilled when Sangeeta gives birth to a baby girl, who they name Chandra. Sangeeta wants Chandra to study, and she is allowed to do so. Chandra meets her neighbor, Kunal, and their family, and is welcomed by them. Problems arise when Kunal and Chandra fall in love, as neither Kunal's family, nor courtesan Subbalaxmi will permit this marriage.

== Cast ==
- Shammi Kapoor as Sagar
- Nanda as Sangeeta
- Kunal Kapoor as Kunal
- Padmini Kolhapure as Chandra
- Rehman as Dr. Siddiqui
- Girish Karnad as Chandrakant
- Shashikala as Subbalaxmi
- Ashalata Wabgaonkar as Kaveri
- Aruna Irani as Savitri
- Deven Verma as Savitri's Husband
- Kader Khan
- Suresh Chatwal
- Soni Razdan as Deepa

== Soundtrack ==
The music was composed By Khayyam and the Lyricist by Naqsh Lyallpuri, Nida Fazli the music was a chartbuster in 1981 after release.

Song	Singer
"Kabhi Kisiko Muqammal Jahan" (Male)	Bhupinder Singh
"Kabhi Kisiko Muqammal Jahan" (Female)	Asha Bhosle
"Bin Bulaaye Hum Chale Aaye"	Asha Bhosle
"Jab Koi Khwab Chamakta Hai"	Asha Bhosle
"Humko Mile Tum, Tumko Mile Hum"	Asha Bhosle, Anwar
"Nazar Se Phool Chunti Hai Nazar"	Asha Bhosle, Anwar
"Kayi Saal Pehle"	Asha Bhosle, Anwar
"Mana Teri Nazar Mein"	Sulakshana Pandit

== Awards and nominations ==
Year	Nominee / work	Award	Result
29th Filmfare Awards	Nanda	Filmfare Award for Best Supporting Actress	Nominated
29th Filmfare Awards	Padmini Kolhapure	Filmfare Special Performance Award	Won
