= Eradu Mukha =

- Directed by: M. R. Vittal
- Written by: Chi. Udayashankar (dialogues)
- Screenplay by: M. R. Vittal
- Based on: Eradu Mukha by Aryamba Pattabhi
- Produced by: B. V. Srinivas; K. S. Prasad; A. S. Bhakthavathsalam
- Starring: Jayanthi; Rajesh; K. S. Ashwath; Sampath; Srividya
- Cinematography: K. Janakiram
- Edited by: P. Bhakthavathsalam
- Music by: Vijaya Bhaskar
- Production company: Chithrashree International
- Distributed by: Chithrashree International
- Release date: 7 April 1969
- Running time: 143 min
- Country: India
- Language: Kannada

Eradu Mukha ( transl. Two Faces) is a 1969 Indian Kannada-language film, directed by M. R. Vittal and produced by B. V. Srinivas, K. S. Prasad and A. S. Bhakthavathsalam. The film stars Jayanthi, Rajesh, K. S. Ashwath and Sampath in the lead roles. The film has musical score by Vijaya Bhaskar. The film was adapted from the novel of the same name written by Aryamba Pattabhi. The movie won the Karnataka State Film Awards - Third Best Film for the year 1969–70.

== Cast ==
- Jayanthi
- Rajesh
- K. S. Ashwath
- Sampath
- Narasimharaju
- Ranga
- Subbanna
- Srinivas
- B. Jaya
- Vijayaleela
- Indrani
- Yamunadevi
- S. Indrani
- Manjula (credited as Kumari Manjula)
- Baby Mala
- Srividya
- Lakshmi Janardhan
