= Prema Karanth =

Indian theatre personality, filmmaker and director (1936-2007)

- Born: 15 August 1936; Bhadravati, Kingdom of Mysore, British India
- Died: 29 October 2007 (aged 71); Bangalore, India
- Occupations: Playwright, film director
- Spouse: B. V. Karanth (1958–2002)

Prema Karanth (15 August 1936 – 29 October 2007) was an Indian theatre personality and the first-ever woman film-maker of Kannada cinema. She was married to B. V. Karanth and was known for the children's plays that she staged. She became the first ever woman director in Kannada cinema when she directed the film Phaniyamma (1983), which was based on a novel by M. K. Indira.

== Early life ==
Prema Karanth was born in 1936 in Bhadravathi to a poor family. She lost her father Devoji Rao early. Her mother Kamalamma was diagnosed of tuberculosis and was not even allowed to touch her. Prema spent her early life at Sidlaghatta in the Kolar district and after her mother's death, she was brought up by her grandparents. After completing her schooling, she came to Bangalore to join the St. Teresa's convent as a teacher. She learnt typing and began to teach in primary schools. Prema also started conducting small-time stage plays in the schools she worked in. She was determined not to get married but she changed her mind when she met B. V. Karanth at a friend's place. In 1958, they got married under Arya Samaj rites and moved to Varanasi, where Prema joined the Banaras Hindu University to continue her education. B. V. Karanth later moved to Delhi to join the National School of Drama. Prema accompanied him and joined the Aurobindo Ashram as a teacher. She started experimenting drama in education, and started to teach even subjects like History and mathematics using plays. On her husband's persuasion, she too joined the National School of Drama where she studied dramatics and completed her graduation. After graduation, she worked with the NSD repertory for two years.

== Career ==
=== In drama ===
Prema Karanth started her career as a dramatist and directed plays like Heddayana, Daithya, Banda Banda Gunavantha and Giant Mama which were mainly oriented towards children. Her plays were mainly those that were written in Kannada or of other Indian languages which were translated to Kannada. She started a children's repertory called as Benaka Makkala Kendra which apart from staging plays like Alilu Ramayana, was also involved in teaching children the art of mime, costume designing and usage of props. This repertory staged its first play titled Alibaba in 1979. She was also a well-known costume designer and has designed costumes for more than 120 plays including Hayavadana, Oedipus, Othello and King Lear.

=== In cinema ===
Prema's association with the cinema world started when she was chosen as the costume designer for G. V. Iyer's movie Hamsageethe. She was also chosen as the art director for a film Kudre Motte in 1977. Initially associated only with art direction, Prema also tried her hand at film-making. Her first directorial venture was Phaniyamma which was based on a Kannada novel and this film earned her critical acclaim. The film is about the story of a girl who is widowed at a young age and her struggles and courage to overcome the stigma attached to it in a male-dominated society.

== Filmography ==
- Phaniyamma (1983) (director)
- Kudre Motte (1977) (art director)
- Hamsageethe (1975) (costume designer)
- Nakkala Rajakumari (1992) (director)
- Band jharonken (hindi) (1996)

== Sources ==
- Dissanayake, Wimal (2004). Indian Popular Cinema: A Narrative of Cultural Change. Trentham Books. ISBN 1-85856-329-1.
- Audrey Foster, Gwendolyn (1995). Women Film Directors: An International Bio-Critical Dictionary. Greenwood Press. ISBN 0-313-28972-7.
