= Upasane =

- Directed by: Puttanna Kanagal
- Written by: Devaki Murthy
- Based on: Upasane by Devaki Murthy
- Produced by: Rashi Brothers
- Starring: Aarathi; Leelavathi; Advani Lakshmi Devi; K. S. Ashwath
- Cinematography: S. V. Srikanth
- Edited by: V. P. Krishnan
- Music by: Vijaya Bhaskar
- Production company: Chitra Jyothi Productions
- Release date: 1974
- Running time: 149 minutes
- Country: India
- Language: Kannada

Upasane (English: Worship) is a 1974 Kannada musical drama film, directed by Puttanna Kanagal. The film produced by Rashi brothers, is based on the novel of the same name, written by Devaki Murthy. The film mostly had women playing the lead roles, consisting of Aarathi, Leelavathi, M. N. Lakshmi Devi, G. V. Sharadha and Advani Lakshmi Devi. Dr. Govinda Mannur, K. S. Ashwath and Seetharam played the male supporting roles. Actor Seetharam was colloquially named as "Upasane" Seetharam for the rest of his career after the release of this film.

The film dealt with the plight of Sharadha (Aarathi) who intends to pursue her career in classical music. The film went on to win multiple high-profile awards at the Karnataka State Film Awards for the year 1974-75 including Best Film, Best Screenplay and Best Cinematography. Aarathi, who played the protagonist at the age of 19, won the Filmfare Best Actress award.

== Cast ==
- Aarathi as Sharada
- Leelavathi as Nagamma
- Advani Lakshmi Devi as Sumithra
- G. V. Sharada
- M. N. Lakshmi Devi as Parvathi
- G. V. Swarnamma as Radio Rangamma
- Baby Rajalakshmi
- Baby Shyam
- Dr. Govinda Mannur
- K. S. Ashwath as Subba Rao
- Venkatarao Talageri
- Upasane Seetharam as Veene Anantha Shastry
- Vajramuni as Neelakantaiah
- H. R. Shastry
- Musuri Krishnamurthy as Saveri Sadashivaiah
- Chethan
- Shivaram as Shankarabharana

== Soundtrack ==
The music was composed by Vijaya Bhaskar. The soundtrack included a very famous Purandaradasa kriti rendered by S. Janaki. All the songs composed for the film were received extremely well and considered as evergreen songs.

Track listing
No.	Title	Lyrics	Singer(s)	Length
1.	"Aacharavillada Naalige"	Purandaradasa	S. Janaki
2.	"Sampige Marada"	R. N. Jayagopal	B. K. Sumitra
3.	"Bhaavavemba Hoovu Arali"	Chi. Udaya Shankar	Vani Jairam
4.	"Bharatha Bhooshira"	Vijaya Narasimha	S. Janaki
5.	"Bhaavayya Bhaavayya"	R. N. Jayagopal	Vani Jairam
6.	"Bhaavayya Bhaavayya"	R. N. Jayagopal	Vani Jairam
7.	"Karaagre Vasathe Lakshmi"	Chi. Udaya Shankar	P. B. Sreenivas, L. R. Anjali

== Awards ==
=== Karnataka State Film Awards 1974-75 ===
1. First Best Film
2. Best Screenplay - Puttanna Kanagal
3. Best Dialogue writer - Navarathnaram
4. Best Cinematographer - S. V. Srikanth
5. Best Editor - V. P. Krishnan
6. Best Sound Recording - S. P. Ramanathan

=== Filmfare Awards South - 1974 ===
1. Best Actress - Aarathi
