= Thaaliya Salangaiya =

- Poster
- Directed by: T. R. Ramanna
- Screenplay by: Vietnam Veedu Sundaram
- Story by: M. K. Indira
- Produced by: M. Sivaprakasam
- Starring: Vanisri; Muthuraman
- Cinematography: M. A. Rahman
- Edited by: T. A. Thangaraj
- Music by: K. V. Mahadevan
- Production company: Sarojini Movies
- Release date: 13 April 1977
- Country: India
- Language: Tamil

Thaaliya Salangaiya (transl. The thaali? Or the anklets?) is a 1977 Indian Tamil-language drama film directed by T. R. Ramanna. The film stars Vanisri and Muthuraman. It is a remake of the 1969 Kannada film Gejje Pooje, itself based on the novel of the same name by M. K. Indira. The film was released on 13 April 1977.

== Cast ==
- Vanisri as Chandra
- Muthuraman as Ramu
- Sathyapriya as Bhuvaneshwari "Bhuvana"
- V. K. Ramasamy
- M. N. Rajam as Kalyani
- Sachu
- Jayamalini as Malathi
- C. K. Saraswathi
- Major Sundarrajan
- Pandari Bai
- S. V. Subbaiah
- S. A. Ashokan
- Shanmugasundaram as Kuberan
- Baby Indira

== Production ==
Thaaliya Salangaiya, a remake of the Kannada film Gejje Pooje, itself based on a novel by the same name by M. K. Indira, was directed by T. R. Ramanna and produced by M. Sivaprakasam under Sarojini Movies. The screenplay was written by Vietnam Veedu Sundaram. Cinematography was handled by M. A. Rahman and editing by T. A. Thangaraj. Television actress Srilekha made her acting debut with this film portraying Muthuraman's sister. Some scenes were shot at AVM Studios.

== Soundtrack ==
The soundtrack was composed by K. V. Mahadevan and lyrics by Kannadasan.

Track listing
No.	Title	Singer(s)	Length
1.	"Alamelu Mangai"	P. Susheela
2.	"Kaamarasam"	Kovai Soundarrajan
3.	"Thaaliya"	Vani Jairam
4.	"Maduraikku sendraal"	P. Susheela

== Release and reception ==
Thaaliya Salangaiya was released on 13 April 1977. Kanthan of Kalki praised the acting performance of Vanisri and other actors and concluded Ramanna has directed the film well.
