= Gejje Pooje =

1969 Indian Kannada film

- VCD cover
- Directed by: Puttanna Kanagal
- Screenplay by: Puttanna Kanagal
- Based on: Gejje Pooje by M. K. Indira
- Produced by: Rashi Brothers
- Starring: Kalpana; Gangadhar; Leelavathi
- Cinematography: Srikanth
- Edited by: V. P. Krishna
- Music by: Vijaya Bhaskar
- Production company: Chithra Jyothi
- Release date: 1969
- Running time: 154 minutes
- Country: India
- Language: Kannada

Gejje Pooje ( transl. Mock marriage) (Note: Gejje means anklet and pooje means worship, still, in the context of this film, it means a mock marriage.) is a 1969 Indian Kannada-language film directed by Puttanna Kanagal and produced by Rashi Brothers. The film stars Kalpana, Gangadhar and Leelavathi. Actress Aarathi made her first screen appearance in this film. It is based on the novel of the same name by M. K. Indira. The film was remade in Telugu as Kalyana Mandapam (1971), in Tamil as Thaaliya Salangaiya (1977), and in Hindi as Ahista Ahista (1981).

== Plot ==
This film explores the problem of prostitutes. The heroine Chandramukhi (played by Kalpana) is the daughter of a devadasi who falls in love with a young man who is her neighbour, as they grew up together. The young girl understands the value of education and with the support of her mother intends to reject the life of prostitution. Circumstances and the young man's suspicions lead him to abandon the heroine. The girl he then goes on to marry is actually her half-sister, the daughter of the heroine's father from his marriage with another woman. He had abandoned both Chandra and her mother. Chandra agrees to perform 'gejje pooje' (literally marrying ankle bracelets) as part of initiation into a life of prostitution, but in the end, she kills herself by crushing and swallowing the diamond (from the ring that was gifted to her by her biological father in his memory).

== Cast ==
- Kalpana as Chandramukhi "Chandra"
- Gangadhar as Somashekhar "Somu"
- Leelavathi as Aparna : Chandra's mother
- Aarathi as Lalita : Somu's sister and Chandra's friend
- Lokanath as Puttanna Shettru "Tiramukulada Savkara"
- Pandari Bai as Tangamma : Somu's mother
- K. S. Ashwath as Ananthaiah : Somu's father
- Annapoornamma as Sangavva : Aparna's foster mother and Chandra's foster grandmother
- Swarnamma
- M. N. Lakshmi Devi as Savitri : Chandra and Somu's neighbour
- Balakrishna as Savitri's husband
- B. V. Radha as Jayalakshmi Somu's wife
- Vajramuni as Gangaiah "Atiguppe Savkara"

== Awards ==
17th National Film Awards

- Best Kannada Film
- Best Screenplay — Puttanna Kanagal

1969–70 Karnataka State Film Awards

- First Best Film
- Best Supporting Actress – Leelavathi
- Best Screenplay — Puttanna Kanagal
- Best Dialogue — Navarathna Ram Rao
- Best Cinematographer — S. V. Srikanth

== Soundtrack ==
The music was composed by Vijaya Bhaskar.

Title	Singers	Lyrics
"Gaganavo Ello"	S. Janaki	R. N. Jayagopal
"Hejje Hejjegu Honne Suriyali"	S. Janaki	Chi. Udaya Shankar
"Maguve Ninna Hoonagu"	S. Janaki	Vijaya Narasimha
"Ondhu Dhina Raathriyali"	B. K. Sumitra	R. N. Jayagopal
"Panchama Vedha, Premadha Naadha"	P. B. Sreenivas	Vijaya Narasimha
"Panchama Vedha, Premadha Naadha"	S. Janaki	Vijaya Narasimha

== Bibliography ==
- Rajadhyaksha, Ashish; Willemen, Paul (1998) [1994]. Encyclopaedia of Indian Cinema. British Film Institute and Oxford University Press. ISBN 0-19-563579-5.
