= Phaniyamma =

- Directed by: Prema Karanth
- Written by: M. K. Indira
- Based on: Phaniyamma by M. K. Indira
- Produced by: Prema Karanth
- Starring: L. V. Sharadha; Baby Prathima; Archana Rao; Prathibha Kasaravalli
- Cinematography: Madhu Ambat
- Edited by: Aruna - Vikas
- Music by: B. V. Karanth
- Production company: Vijay Shekar Movies
- Release date: 1983
- Running time: 106 minutes
- Country: India
- Language: Kannada

Phaniyamma is a 1983 Indian Kannada award-winning drama film directed and produced by Prema Karanth. The story is based on acclaimed novelist M. K. Indira's 1977 Sahitya Academy Award-winning novel of the same name. The film highlighted the plight of a widow and her struggle for survival.

The film's cast included many players from a theatrical background including L. V. Sharadha, Prathibha Kasaravalli, Archana Rao, Vishwanath Rao and Kasaragod Chinna. Actor Ananth Nag made a guest appearance in the film.

The film was widely appreciated by critics and audience upon release. It went on to win National Film Award for Best Feature Film in Kannada and many International film awards. The film also was awarded multiple Karnataka State Film Awards including Best Film, Best Supporting actress and Best Story writer.

== Cast ==
- L. V. Sharadha
- Baby Prathima
- Pratibha Kasaravalli
- Archana Rao
- Poornima Gaonkar
- Vishwanath Rao
- Kasaragodu Chinna
- Malathi Sridhar
- Bhavani
- Chidanand
- Ananth Nag in a guest appearance
- Venugopal Kasaragod in a guest appearance

== Soundtrack ==
The music of the film was composed by B. V. Karanth to the lyrics of Chandrashekhara Kambara.

Track listing
No.	Title	Lyrics	Singer(s)	Length
1.	"Runner Runner"	Chandrashekhara Kambara	S. Janaki
2.	"Eenennale Thaayi"	Chandrashekhara Kambara	Jayachandran

== Awards ==
The film has won the following awards since its release.

1982 National Film Awards (India)

- Won – National Film Award for Best Feature Film in Kannada

1982-83 Karnataka State Film Awards (India)

- Won – Karnataka State Film Award for Best Film
- Won – Karnataka State Film Award for Best Supporting Actress – Archana Rao
- Won – Karnataka State Film Award for Best Story – M. K. Indira

This film screened at 9th IFFI.
