= Rajyotsava Awards (2015) =

Awards given by the government of Karnataka, India

2015 Rajyotsava Awards
- Date: 1 November 2015
- Location: Bangalore, Karnataka
- Country: India
- Presented by: Government of Karnataka

The Government of Karnataka announced the Rajyotsava awards for the year 2015. The awardees included 60 noted eminent individuals from various fields.

== List of 2015 Awardees ==
The Rajyotsava award winners for the year 2015 are:

=== Individual ===
Aryamba Pattabhi

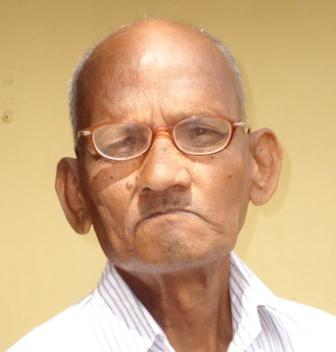
Veerendra Simpi

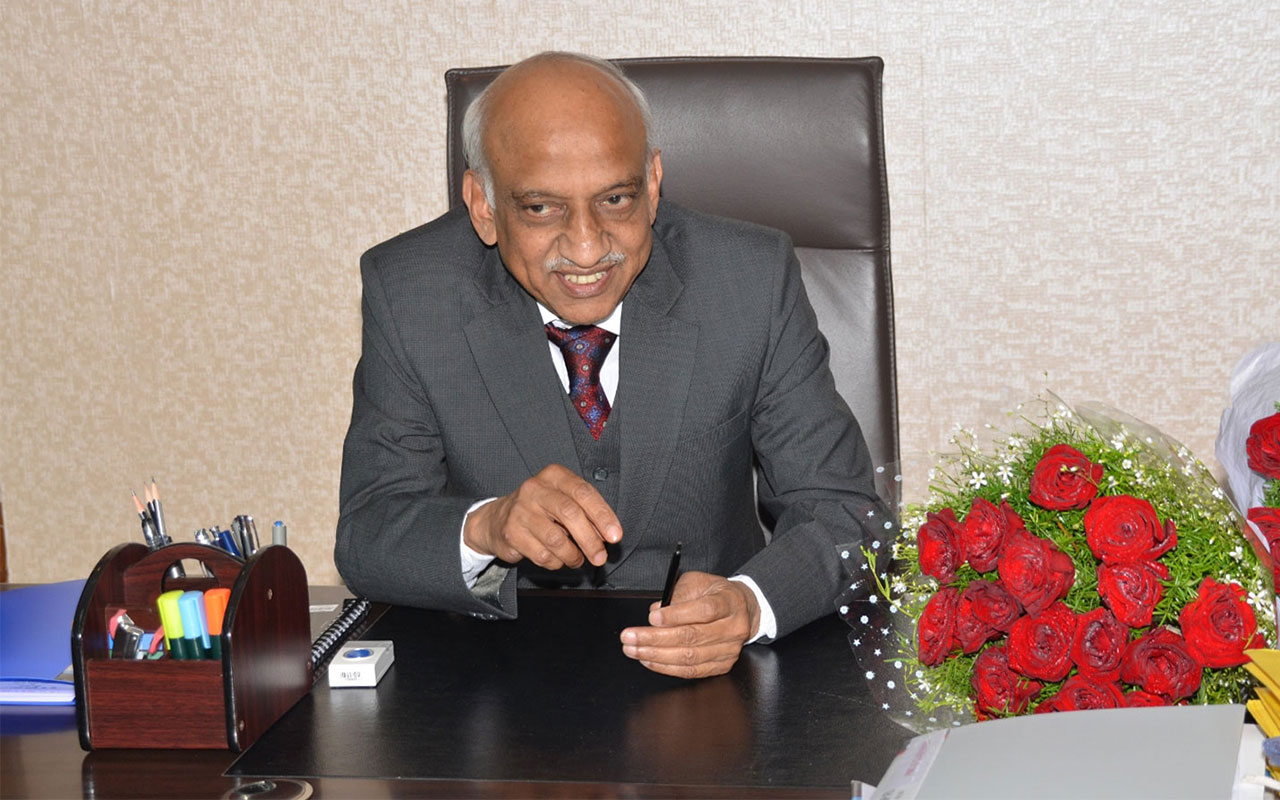
A. S. Kiran Kumar

Sl.No	Awardee	Area of expertise	Location	Highlights
1	Prof. K G Nagarajappa	Literature	Tumakuru	Writer and Literary figure from Kallur in Tumakuru district. He is known for his literary works Maruchintane and Devanga Samkruthi. Conferred Nadoja Award in 2011.
2	Jinadatta Desai	Literature	Belagavi	Kannada writer and retired judge. Desai hails from the Amminabhavi village of Dharwad district. He has published seven poem anthologies. He is known to bring out the hypocrisy of society in his poems.
3	Aryamba Pattabhi	Literature	Mysuru	Literary figure.
4	Veerendra Simpi	Literature	Bidar	Literary figure.
5	H. L. Keshava Murthy	Literature	Mandya	Literary figure.
6	H. G. Somashekar Rao	Theatre	Bengaluru	Theatre figure.
7	B Kariyappa Master	Theatre	Raichur	Theatre figure.
8	Mumtaz Begum	Theatre	Gadag	Theatre figure.
9	Sanjeevappa Gabbur	Theatre	Raichur	Theatre figure.
10	Veena Adavani	Theatre	Ballari	Theatre figure.
11	Sriramulu	Music and Dance	Kolar	Artist.
12	Lokesh Das	Music and Dance	Hassan	Artist.
13	Kasimsab Jamadar	Music and Dance	Uttara Kannada	Artist.
14	Shobha R Huilgol	Music and Dance	Gadag	Artist.
15	Chitra Venugopal	Music and Dance	Bengaluru	Kathak danseuse and choreographer with a career spanning over 60 years. Renowned teacher at Bharatiya Vidya Bhavan since 2000. She has been awarded the Kala Shri in 1997 and the Senior Fellowship Award for research in Abhinaya in Kathak by the Ministry of HRD (2000-2002).
16	Kamalakshi M. J.	Art and Sculpture	Bengaluru Rural	Artist.
17	P. S. Kademani	Art and Sculpture	Vijayapura	Artist.
18	Mallappa Maliyappa Badigera	Art and Sculpture	Bagalkot	Artist.
19	Mariswamy	Art and Sculpture	Bengaluru Rural	Artist.
20	Margoli Govinda Shiregara	Yakshagana / Bayalata	Udupi	Folk art exponent.
21	Mudambilu Gopalakrishna Shastri	Yakshagana / Bayalata	Dakshina Kannada	Folk art exponent.
22	Sakravva Yallavva Patrota	Yakshagana / Bayalata	Belagavi	Folk art exponent.
23	Tammannachar	Yakshagana / Bayalata	Mysuru	Folk art exponent.
24	Prakash Bhat	Agriculture and Environment	Dharwad	Agriculture Scientist
25	Mallanna Nagarala	Agriculture and Environment	Bagalkot	President, Bijapur Integrated Rural Development Society (BIRDS),
26	Krishnappa Dasappa Gowda aka Bannur Krishnappa	Agriculture and Environment	Mysuru	Krishnappa is a practitioner and active advocate of natural farming (in lieu of chemical farming) which he believes is the answer to the agricultural crisis farmers face these days. His farm in Bannur has been visited by five lakh farmers in three years.
27	Muttanna Poojara	Agriculture and Environment	Haveri	
28	A. S. Kiran Kumar	Science	Chikkamagaluru	Chairman of ISRO.
29	Abdul Aziz	Science	Kolar	Scientist.
30	Dr R. K. Saroja	Medical	Chikkaballapur	Medicine.
31	Sowcar Janaki	Film and TV	Bengaluru	Leading Actor. Has over 385 movies in Kannada, Tamil and Telugu to her credit. She has acted with leading artists like Dr. RajKumar, MGR, N. T. Rama Rao, A. Nageswara Rao and Sivaji Ganesan. Awarded Filmfare Lifetime Achievement Award – South (1984) and Kalaimamani award.
32	Sadashiva Brahmavara	Film and TV	Dharwad	Artist.
33	Sadhu Kokila	Film and TV	Bengaluru	Artist-Music Director
34	Shani Mahadevappa	Film and TV	Mandya	Artist.
35	M. S. Helavar	Social Service	Chikkamagaluru	Social Service worker.
36	Karin Kumar	Social Service	Bengaluru	Social Service worker.
37	Nira Srinivas Shanbhag	Social Service	Uttara Kannada	Social Service worker.
38	R. R. Padaki	Social Service	Vijayapura	Social Service worker.
39	Akkai Padmashali	Social Service	Bengaluru	Social Service worker.
40	Justice A. J. Sadashiva	Judiciary	Mandya	Retired judge.
41	Machar Gopala Nayak	Folklore	Dakshina Kannada	Folk artist.
42	Appagere Timmaraju	Folklore	Ramanagar	Folk artist.
43	Kenchamade Gowda	Folklore	Chamarajnagar	Folk artist.
44	Hanif M. Shiek	Folklore	Kalaburagi	Folk artist.
45	Gurulingappa Veerasangappa Karadi	Folklore	Bagalkot	Folk artist.
46	Mariyamma Basanna Shiravati	Folklore	Yadgir	Folk artist.
47	Kalle Shivottama Rao	Media	Udupi	Media person.
48	Prof H. S. Eshwar	Media	Shivamogga	Media person.
49	Nagamani S. Rao	Media	Bengaluru	Media person.
50	Hanumantha Hoogar	Media	Dharwad	Media person.
51	Naganna	Media	Tumakuru	Media person.
52	Pandanda Kuttappa	Sports person	Kodagu	Hockey player.
53	Vinay Kumar	Sports person	Davanagere	Indian Cricket player. Right-arm medium fast bowler. He has represented India at Test, One Day International (ODI) and Twenty20 levels. He captained Karnataka to two consecutive Ranji Trophy titles in 2013–14 and 2014–15 seasons.
54	Niranjan Mukundan	Sports person	Bengaluru	Swimmer. Junior world champion in the International Wheelchair and Amputee Sports (IWAS) 11th World Junior Games at Stadskanaal, Netherlands. Niranjan clinched seven gold and three silver medals.
55	H. S. Patil	Others	Koppal	
56	Lakshman Telagavi	Others	Chitradurga	
57	Fakirappa Reddy Basappa Reddy Gaddanakeri	Others	Gadag	
58	S. Tippeswamy	Others	Mysuru	
59	Sharada Rajanna	Horanadu (overseas Kannadiga)	from Mysuru, now in USA	

=== Organisations/Associations ===
Sl.No	Awardee	Area of expertise	Location	Highlights
1	P. G. Halakatti Research Centre		Vijayapura	
