= Hosa Belaku =

1982 Kannada romantic drama film directed by Dorai Bhagwan duo

- VCD cover
- Directed by: Dorai–Bhagavan
- Written by: Chi. Udaya Shankar (dialogues)
- Screenplay by: Dorai - Bhagwan
- Story by: Vani
- Based on: Hosa Belaku by Vani
- Produced by: S. A. Srinivas; Sadanand; Rajashekar; Shivaram
- Starring: Dr. Rajkumar; Saritha; Srinivasa Murthy
- Cinematography: B. C. Gowrishankar
- Edited by: P. Bhaktavatsalam
- Music by: M. Ranga Rao
- Production company: Kathyayini Cine Arts
- Release date: 5 March 1982
- Running time: 148 minutes
- Country: India
- Language: Kannada

Hosa Belaku ( transl. New Light) is a 1982 Kannada-language romantic drama film directed by Dorai–Bhagavan duo. It is based on the novel of the same name by Vani. The film starred Rajkumar, Saritha, Mamatha Rao and K. S. Ashwath. The movie saw a theatrical run of 26 weeks.

The film was a musical blockbuster with all the songs composed by M. Ranga Rao considered to be evergreen hits. He was awarded with the State Award for Best Music Director for the year.

== Plot ==
Ravi (Rajkumar) works in Delhi. He goes to Mysore to spend time with his sister and her family, which comprises her husband (Ashwath), a college-going daughter Nagaveni (Shobha), a young son (Puneeth Rajkumar as child actor) and a step-daughter Vatsala (Sarita). Being a typical step-mother, the sister ill treats Vatsala all the time much to the dismay of Ravi. He tries to lessen Vatsala's troubles by pretending to help his sister and obtains her consent to send Vatsala to college. Vatsala and Ravi slowly fall in love.

Back in Delhi, Ravi's boss's daughter (Mamatha Rao) has fallen in love with him. Realizing he loves Vatsala Ravi resigns from his job and relocates to Mysore. When the sister learns that Vatsala and Ravi are in love, she blackmails Vatsala and forces her to reject Ravi so that Nagaveni can marry Ravi instead. When a dejected Ravi meets with an accident, and becomes blind Nagaveni refuses to marry him. Vatsala's marriage has been arranged against her consent. The succeeding events lead to a happy ending.

== Cast ==
Actor	Role
Rajkumar	Ravi
Saritha	Vatsala
Srinivasa Murthy	Murthy
Mamatha Rao	Latha
K. S. Ashwath	Gopalayya
Master Lohith	Puttu
Dubbing Janaki	Rajarajeshwari
Shivaram	Rajaraya
Honnavalli Krishna
Sudha Sindhoor	Vedha
Rathnakar	Astrologer
Shobha (Kannada actress)	Nagaveni

== Soundtrack ==
Hosa Belaku

Soundtrack album by M. Ranga Rao
- Released: 1985
- Recorded: 1982
- Genre: Feature film soundtrack
- Language: Kannada
- Label: Sangeetha
- Director: M. Ranga Rao

The music was composed by M. Ranga Rao with lyrics by Chi. Udaya Shankar. All the songs composed for the film were received extremely well and considered as evergreen songs. The song Kanneeradhaare was based on Jagjit Singh's ghazal Koi Pass Aaya Sawere Sawere and was composed in Lalit raaga.

Track listing
No.	Title	Lyrics	Singer(s)	Length
1.	"Ravi Neenu Aagasadinda"	Chi. Udaya Shankar	S. Janaki, Dr. Rajkumar
2.	"Hosa Belaku"	Chi. Udaya Shankar	Dr. Rajkumar
3.	"Cheluveye Ninna Nodalu"	Chi. Udaya Shankar	Dr. Rajkumar, S. Janaki
4.	"Neenade Baalige Jyothi"	Chi. Udaya Shankar	S. Janaki, Dr. Rajkumar
5.	"Kannera Dhaare"	Chi. Udaya Shankar	Dr. Rajkumar
6.	"Theredide Mane"	Kuvempu	S. Janaki, Vani Jayaram

== Awards ==
Karnataka State Film Awards 1981–82

- Best Actor - Rajkumar
- Best Music Director - M. Ranga Rao

Filmfare Awards South 1982

- Best Actress (Kannada) - Saritha
