= Eradu Kanasu (1974 film) =

1974 Indian Kannada film by Dore Bhagavan

- Poster
- Directed by: Dorai–Bhagavan
- Written by: Vani
- Based on: Eradu Kanasu by Vani
- Produced by: Dorai Bhagawan
- Starring: Rajkumar; Kalpana; Manjula
- Cinematography: R. Chittibabu
- Edited by: Venkatram
- Music by: Rajan–Nagendra
- Production company: Anupam Movies
- Release date: 1974
- Running time: 144 minutes
- Country: India
- Language: Kannada

Eradu Kanasu (Note: Spelt as Yeradu Kanasu on the CBFC certificate.) ( transl. Two Dreams) is a 1974 Indian Kannada-language romantic drama film directed by the duo Dorai–Bhagavan, and is based on the novel of the same name by Vani. The film stars Rajkumar, Kalpana and Manjula.

The film was a musical blockbuster with all the songs composed by Rajan–Nagendra considered evergreen hits. They were awarded with the Karnataka State Film Award for Best Music Director for 1974–75.

The movie saw a theatrical run of 30 weeks. The movie completed 100 days when it was re-released in 1982. The film's success led to its second re-release on 6 February 2015 across Karnataka state. The movie was remade in Telugu in 1975 as Pooja with three songs of this movie retained in the Telugu version.

== Plot ==
Ramachandra "Ramu" is a professor at a college in Bangalore, who is married to Gowri, the daughter of a lawyer, to fulfil his mother's wishes. But he broods over his past relationship with his cousin/love interest Lalitha, when her father refused to let Ramu marry Lalitha, due to some internal disputes. After their marriage, Ramu is distant from Gowri, who remains devoted to Ramu and is yearning for her husband's love. Ramu's parents observe his behaviour and leave for their village, hoping that their absence would unite the couple. Gowri asks Ramu why he is aloof towards her, but he does not give a clear reply. When Ramu visits his lecturer friend, he sees that his friend is happily married to Lalitha and has a child. He realizes his mistake of brooding over the past for too long and neglecting Gowri and heads to meet her at a temple. When Ramu meets Gowri, the latter meets with an accident. Ramu admits her to a hospital and spends the night by her side. In the morning, the two make up and Ramu asks Gowri to forgive him for ignoring her.

== Cast ==
- Rajkumar as Professor Ramachandra Rao (Ramu)
- Kalpana as Gowri, Ramu's wife
- Manjula as Lalitha, Ramu's former love interest
- K. S. Ashwath as Ramu's father
- Balakrishna as uncle
- Rajanand as Kittanna, Lalitha's father
- Sampath as Gowri's father
- Advani Lakshmi Devi as Ramu's mother
- M. Jayashree as Gowri's mother
- Bhargavi Narayan as lecturer
- Ramgopal as Lalitha's husband
- Vaishali Kasaravalli as Latha
- Pandari Bai in a special appearance

== Production ==
Eradu Kanasu is based on the novel of the same name by Vani. The song "Endendu Ninnanu Marethu" was shot at Gajanur dam in Shivamoga district. The filming was also held at Aldor village at Chikmagalur for fifteen days.

== Themes and influences ==
Though Eradu Kanasu is based on a novel, Muralidhara Khajane of The Hindu mentioned that the plot was similar to William Shakespeare's Romeo and Juliet.

== Soundtrack ==
Eradu Kanasu

Soundtrack album by Rajan–Nagendra
- Released: 1974
- Genre: Feature film soundtrack
- Label: Saregama

The music was composed by Rajan–Nagendra with lyrics penned by Chi. Udaya Shankar. The album consists of six tracks. All the songs composed for the film were received extremely well and considered as evergreen songs.

The song Thamnam Thamnam was remixed by Mano Murthy in Abhinetri (2015).

The tune of the song Endendu Ninnanu Marethu was used in the 1992 Hindi movie Jaan Se Pyaara as Bin Tere Kuch Bhi Nahi Hai Jeevan Mera. The same song was also recreated in Muddina Kanmani starring Shivarajkumar.

No.	Title	Lyrics	Singers	Picturization	Length
01	"Endu Ninna Noduve"	Chi. Udaya Shankar	P. B. Sreenivas	Rajkumar	4:06
02	"Endendu Ninnanu Marethu"	Chi. Udaya Shankar	P. B. Sreenivas Vani Jayaram	Rajkumar Manjula	4:34
03	"Baadi Hoda Balli inda "	Chi. Udaya Shankar	P. B. Sreenivas	Rajkumar	3:21
04	"Poojisalendhe Hoogala tande "	Chi. Udaya Shankar	S. Janaki	Kalpana	4:21
05	"Thamnam Thamnam"	Chi. Udaya Shankar	P. B. Sreenivas S. Janaki	Rajkumar Kalpana	4:21
06	"Indu Enage Govindha "	Raghavendra Swamy	S. Janaki	Kalpana	4:21

== Reception ==
In a 2015 review of the film, a critic from The Hans India gave the film a rating of 4 1/2 out of 5 and wrote that "The film was a blockbuster hit and a must watch".

== Awards ==
At the 1973–74 Karnataka State Film Awards, the film won the award for Best Music Director (Rajan–Nagendra).

== Legacy ==
The film is considered as one of the greatest romantic films in Kannada noted for the strong performances of lead actors Rajkumar and Kalpana.

The film's title inspired a 2017 film of same name starring Vijay Raghavendra.
