= Eradu Kanasu (2017 film) =

- Film poster
- Directed by: Madan
- Starring: Vijay Raghavendra Karunya Ram Krishi Tapanda
- Cinematography: Darshan Kanaka
- Edited by: Ranjit
- Music by: Steve-Kaushik
- Release date: 17 March 2017
- Country: India
- Language: Kannada

Eradu Kanasu (transl. Two Dreams) is a 2017 Indian Kannada film directed by Madan, it stars Vijay Raghavendra and Karunya Ram.

The film was dubbed in Hindi as Ab Insaaf Hoga' By Pen Movies.

== Cast ==
- Vijay Raghavendra as Muthu
- Karunya Ram
- Krishi Tapanda
- Petrol Prasanna
- Kuri Prathap
- Basanth gowda as child artist

== Production ==
The film began production in September 2015 with Vijay Raghavendra announcing that he would act in a project directed by Madan with the title named after 1974 film of same name. Coincidentally S. K. Bhagawan, director of that film clapped the first shot during the launch at Kanteerava Studios.

== Soundtrack ==
Eradu Kanasu

Soundtrack album by Steve-Kaushik
- Released: 2016
- Recorded: 2016
- Genre: Soundtrack
- Length: 25:03
- Label: Ashwini Media Networks
- Producer: Steve-Kaushik

Music was composed by Steve-Kaushik and released on Ashwini Media Networks.

Track List
No.	Title	Singer(s)	Length
1.	"Sooryana Jaati"	Chandan Shetty, Kaushik Harsha	3:44
2.	"Chappale Chappale"	Vijay Prakash, Shwetha Prabhu	4:03
3.	"E Oorige Oore"	Shankar Mahadevan	5:26
4.	"Nooru Kampana"	Rajesh Krishnan, Anuradha Bhat	4:08
5.	"Nenedena"	Kaushik Harsha	4:40
6.	"Maatumatigu Kollo"	Supriyaa Ram (Supriya Lohith)	1:39
7.	"Om Satya Devaya Namah"	Ananya Bhagath	1:23
Total length:			25:03

== Reception ==
A critic from The Times of India wrote that "While Vijay Raghavendra has given his all for this film, one wishes the story did justice to his talent, especially after his winning performance in Chowka this year". A critic from Bangalore Mirror wrote that "This is a film you should recommend to someone you hate and want to see cry".
