= Anasuya Shankar =

Indian Kannada novelist

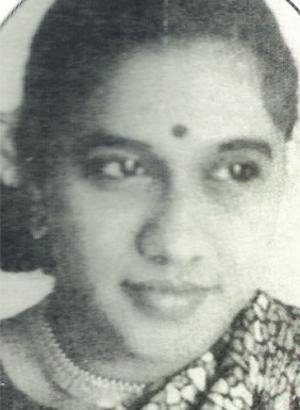
- Triveni
- Born: 1 September 1928; Mandya, Mysore, Kingdom of Mysore, British India
- Died: 29 July 1963 (aged 34); Mysore, Mysore State, India
- Occupation: Novelist
- Spouse: S. N. Shankar
- Children: 1
- Relatives: Aryamba Pattabhi (sister); B. M. Srikantaiah (uncle); Vani (cousin)
- Writing career
- Pen name: Triveni
- Language: Kannada
- Period: 1953–1963
- Website: Triveni

Anasuya Shankar (1 September 1928 – 29 July 1963), popularly known by her pen name Triveni, was an Indian writer of modern fiction in Kannada language. Many of her novels have been made into feature films, most prominently, Belli Moda (1967) and Sharapanjara (1971) – both directed by Puttanna Kanagal and featuring actress Kalpana. Her short-stories collection Samasyeya Magu won the Devaraja Bahadur Prize in 1950. Her novel Avala Mane earned the Karnataka Sahitya Academy Award in 1960.

== Life ==
Anasuya Shankar was born on 1 September 1928 in the Mandya in the erstwhile Kingdom of Mysore of British India (in present-day Mandya district Karnataka), to B. M. Krishnaswamy and Thangamma. She was also called Bhagirathi. She had a younger sister Aryamba Pattabhi, who went on to become a writer as well. Other writers in her family were uncle B. M. Srikantaiah and cousin Vani.

She graduated with a gold medal in her Bachelor of Arts degree from Maharani's Arts College in Mysore. In 1947, she was awarded the Siddegowda gold medal for excellence in political science. She married S. N. Shankar (1925–2012) in 1951, an English professor at Sarada Vilas College, Mysore.

Anasuya adopted the pen name Triveni out of respect for Mahatma Gandhi, whose ashes following his death, were immersed in the confluence of the three Indian rivers of Ganges, Yamuna and the invisible Sarasvati, known as the Triveni Sangam. Anasuya died of pulmonary embolism on 29 July 1963, ten days after giving birth to Meera, from her third pregnancy after two miscarriages, at the Mission Hospital in Mysore.

== Career ==
Triveni published her first novel Apasvara in 1952. After that, she published 20 novels and 3 short story collections. Her novels mainly contained stories based on the psychological issues faced by women, their emotions and frustrations. Her Tavareya Kola won the Sahitya Akademi Award.

== Literary works ==
=== Novels ===
- Apaswara (Disharmony, 1952)
- Hoovu Hannu (Flower Fruit, 1953)
- Sotu Geddavalu (Lost and won, 1953)
- Bekkina Kannu (Cat's Eye, 1954)
- Modala Hejje (The First Step, 1956)
- Keelu Gombe (The Puppet, 1955)
- Belli Moda (Silver cloud)
- Doorada Betta (Distant Hill, 1955)
- Apajaya (Defeat, 1956)
- Mucchida Bagilu (Closed Door, 1956)
- Kankana (Sacred Bond, 1957)
- Mukti (Bliss, 1957)
- Baanu Belagitu (The sky shines)
- Hrudaya Geethe (The song of the heart)
- Avala Mane (Her house)
- Tavareya Kola (Lotus pond)
- Vasantagaana (Song of spring)
- Kashi Yatre (Journey to Kashi/Wedding ritual)
- Sharapanjara (Cage of Arrows, 1962)
- Hannele Chiguridaga (When the old leaf turns green again, 1963)
- Avala Magalu (Her daughter)
- Doorada Betta (Distant Hill, 1955)

=== Collection of short stories ===
- Hendatiya Hesaru (Wife's name)
- Eradu Manasu (Two Minds)
- Samasyeya Magu (Problem child)

== Filmography based on her novels ==
- Chettathi (1965) Malayalam movie directed by Puttanna Kanagal based on Hannele Chiguridaga.
- Poocha Kanni (1966) Malayalam movie directed by Puttanna Kanagal based on Bekkina Kannu.
- Belli Moda (1967)
- Hannele Chiguridaga (1968)
- Sharapanjara (1971)
- Kankana (1975) based on Kankana & Mukti
- Hoovu Hannu (1993)
- Sarala Subbarao (2025)
