= Kanagal, Mysore =

Kanagal
- village
- Country: India
- State: Karnataka
- District: Mysore

Government
  - Body: Gram panchayat
- Elevation: 900 m (3,000 ft)

Languages
  - Official: Kannada
- Time zone: UTC+5:30 (IST)
- ISO 3166 code: IN-KA
- Vehicle registration: KA
- Nearest city: Mysore, Madikeri, Hassan
- Website: karnataka.gov.in

Kanagal is a village in Mysore district, Karnataka. Located in Periyapatna Taluk, the town lies close to Coorg and Hassan districts. It is located on the bank of the Cauvery River. It is also birthplace of legendary Kannada film director Puttanna Kanagal, and his brother, lyricist Kanagal Prabhakara Shasthry. Villagers are mainly farmers though many members of the younger generation are working in other fields such as medical, engineering, teaching, police, army, and industries.

Kanagal is governed locally by its gram panchayat (ಗ್ರಾಮ ಪಂಚಾಯಿತಿ). This village has a government primary and secondary school, and a govt. PU (pre-university) college. There also is a private school, DVSK. The town is also host to a government hospital, A Bank (branch of Karnataka Gramin Bank) and a veterinary hospital.

This village is also famous for its tobacco plantations and paddy fields.

A UFO was reportedly sighted near Kanagal in October 2015.
