= Belli Moda =

1967 Kannada film directed by Puttanna Kanagal

- Poster
- Directed by: Puttanna Kanagal
- Screenplay by: Puttanna Kanagal
- Based on: Belli Moda by Triveni
- Produced by: T. N. Srinivasan
- Starring: Kalyan Kumar; Kalpana; K. S. Ashwath; Pandari Bai; T. N. Balakrishna
- Cinematography: R. N. K. Prasad
- Edited by: V. P. Krishnan
- Music by: Vijaya Bhaskar
- Release date: 1967
- Running time: 168 minutes
- Country: India
- Language: Kannada

Belli Moda ( transl. Silver Cloud) is a 1967 Indian Kannada-language film directed by Puttanna Kanagal in his directorial debut. It was based on the novel of same name by Triveni. Kanagal remade the film in Malayalam as Swapnabhoomi (1967) and in Telugu as Palamanasulu (1968).

== Plot ==
Indira (played by Kalpana) is the heiress of her father's estate, named "Belli Moda". A young man, Mohan (Kalyan Kumar) visits the estate to meet Indira's father (K. S. Ashwath) and petition for a financial scholarship from their club for his higher studies in the United States. Mohan discovers he has visited Belli Moda too late and the scholarships for that year have already been given out. It is suggested that he should apply next year. However, Indira's mother (Pandari Bai) is impressed by Mohan's good looks and qualifications, and suggests to her husband that they should arrange for Mohan and Indira to be married. Mohan and his family are initially reluctant, but eventually agree to the arrangement after knowing that Indira is the only daughter so all of her father's estate will eventually pass to them. Mohan is provided with a scholarship for his education in the USA upon accepting the arrangement. Mohan leaves for the US after becoming engaged to Indira, promising to marry on his return. While he is abroad, Indira's mother unexpectedly gives birth to a boy. She dies due to complications of pregnancy at an advanced maternal age.

Mohan returns from the US after his studies to discover that his fiancée's mother has died in labour, leaving behind a son - the new inheritor of Belli Moda. This shatters Mohan's dreams of owning the estate and he refuses to marry Indira. When Indira questions him about his refusal to marry, she is shocked to discover that Mohan's only interest was in her father's property and that there was no love towards her. When leaving Bella Moda after this confrontation with Indira, Mohan falls from the hill and fractures his leg. A doctor advises him to rest uninterrupted until his leg heals, meaning he must at the estate and be taken care of by Indira and her family. During recovery, Mohan is surprised by the hospitality and love offered to him by the family, and is particularly taken by the Indira's kindness. He struggles to understand why he is taken care of so well despite his treachery. He realises that he made a mistake by rejecting a woman of such good character, and that Indira's love is more valuable than simple wealth. Mohan expresses remorse and wants to marry Indira, however she tells him that the innocence of pure love cannot be replaced once it is lost. Indira refuses to marry him, dismissing his proposal by saying "Belli karegithu Moda chadurithu" (The silver lining is gone, the clouds are scattered).

== Cast ==
- Kalyan Kumar as Mohan Rao
- Kalpana as Indira
- K. S. Ashwath as Sadashivaiah
- Pandari Bai as Lalithamma
- Balakrishna as Puttaiah
- B. Jaya as Savithri
- Dwarakish as Paapaiah "Paapi"

== Production ==
Belli Moda marked the directorial debut of Puttanna Kanagal and was based on novel of same name by Triveni. This was the first Kannada movie to be shot completely outdoors. The film was shot in Thippanahalli estate, Chikkamagaluru. Ashwath Narayan started his career as still photographer with this film.

== Awards ==
Karnataka State Film Awards 1967-68

- Second Best Film
- Best Actress – Kalpana
- Best Supporting Actress – Pandaribai
- Best Music Director – Vijaya Bhaskar
- Best Screenplay – S R Puttanna Kanagal
- Best Cinematographer – R N K Prasad
- Best Editing – V P Krishnan

== Soundtrack ==
Title	Singers	Lyrics
"Belli Modada"	P. B. Sreenivas, P. Susheela	R. N. Jayagopal
"Idhe Nanna Uttara"	P. B. Sreenivas, P. Susheela	R. N. Jayagopal
"Muddhina Giniye Baaro"	P. Susheela	R. N. Jayagopal
"Odeyithu Olavina"	P. B. Sreenivas	R. N. Jayagopal
"Moodala Maneya Muttina Neerina"	S. Janaki	Da. Ra. Bendre

== Release ==
The film initially struggled for release as distributors refused to buy the film due to "its heart-rending climax". However K. C. N. Chandrasekhar "sensed the uniqueness of the story and decided to release it".

== Legacy ==
The film's writer Triveni's home was converted into a museum and was named after the film. The film's location Thippanahalli estate came to be known as Belli Moda estate after the release.
