= Amrutha Ghalige =

- Lobby card
- Directed by: Puttanna Kanagal
- Screenplay by: Puttanna Kanagal
- Based on: Avadhana by Dodderi Venkatagiri Rao
- Produced by: S. R. Rajan; Bheema Rao; K Nagarathna; Puttanna Kanagal
- Starring: Ramakrishna; Padma Vasanthi; Sridhar
- Cinematography: B. S. Basavaraj
- Edited by: V. P. Krishna
- Music by: Vijaya Bhaskar
- Release date: 1984
- Running time: 139 minutes
- Country: India
- Language: Kannada

Amrutha Ghalige ( transl. The Auspicious Moment) is a 1984 Indian Kannada-language romantic drama film directed by Puttanna Kanagal, based on the novel Avadaana, by Dodderi Venkatagiri Rao. The film stars Ramakrishna, Padma Vasanthi and Sridhar.

== Plot ==
This movie deals with the cause and consequences of teenage pregnancy. The heroine (Padmavasanthi), hailing from a poor background, falls in love with an affluent young man (Ramakrishna). The young man impregnates her and leaves her in a lurch. The heroine's classmate (Sridhar) comes forward to marry her and give an identity to her child. Unfortunately, the classmate dies due to an illness soon after. The young man comes back and unexpectedly meets his son. The classmate has written a letter that he had considered the heroine as his sister, and she was as pure as river Ganges. Finally the young man accepts the heroine.

== Cast ==
- Ramakrishna as Manohar [Manu]
- Padma Vasanthi as Renuka (Renu)
- Sridhar as Madhu
- Jyoti as Manu's Sister
- Kalpanarani as Savitri (Madhu's Sister)
- Umashree
- B. K. Shankar as Halappa (shopkeeper)

== Production ==
Sridhar was studying engineering when he was approached to act in this film. He asked Puttanna Kanagal for a week to make his decision.

== Soundtrack ==
All songs are composed by Vijaya Bhaskar, with lyrics written by Vijaya Narasimha. B. R. Chaya made her Kannada debut with this film and her rendition of "Hindustanavu Endu" became famous.

Amrutha

Soundtrack album by Vijaya Bhaskar
- Released: 1984
- Genre: Feature film soundtrack
- Label: Sangeetha

Track #	Song	Singer(s)
1	"Mayuri Natya Mayuri"	S. P. Balasubrahmanyam, B. R. Chaya
2	"Hindustanavu Endu"	P. Jayachandran
3	"Hindustanavu Endu"	B. R. Chaya
4	"Parvathi Parashivana"	S. P. Balasubrahmanyam, B. R. Chaya

== Awards ==
- Karnataka State Film Awards 1983–84
  - Best Screenplay – Puttanna Kanagal
  - Best Cinematographer – B. S. Basavaraj
  - Best Editor – V. P. Krishna
