= Puttanna Kanagal =

Indian filmmaker (1933–1985)

- Born: Shubraveshti Ramaswamiah Seetharama Sharma; 1 December 1933; Kanagal, Kingdom of Mysore
- Died: 5 June 1985 (aged 51); Bangalore, India
- Other names: Puttanna, Seetharama Sharma
- Occupations: Film director, producer, screenwriter
- Years active: 1957–1985
- Spouse(s): Nagalakshmi; Aarathi (1976-1981)
- Children: 5
- Relatives: Kanagal Prabhakara Shastry (brother)

Shubraveshti Ramaswamiah Seetharama Sharma (1 December 1933 – 5 June 1985), known popularly as S. R. Puttanna Kanagal, was an Indian filmmaker known for his work in Kannada cinema. He is often considered one of Indian cinema's most influential filmmakers.

== Background and personal life ==
Puttanna Kanagal was born to Ramaswamaiah and Subbamma into a poor family in Kanagal, a village in the erstwhile Kingdom of Mysore. He hailed from a poor brahmin family, and had to endure hardships and struggled to get a decent job. He worked as a teacher, salesman and even as a cleaner. His job as a publicity boy brought him closer to theatre and subsequently to cinema. His association with films began when he started working for B. R. Panthulu as an assistant director and also as his driver. His first film as an assistant director was Rathnagiri Rahasya (1957).

Puttanna married Nagalakshmi at a very young age and they had 5 children. Later, he fell in love with his protege and a leading actress in the 1970s Aarathi and they got married during 1976–77. They had a daughter Yashaswini, who was born in 1978. However, due to creative differences Puttanna and Aarathi separated in 1981.

In 1981, Puttanna's magnum opus Ranganayaki did not do as well as expected at the box office, even though it gained critical acclaim and later went on to become a cult classic. In addition to this, separation from Aarathi had impacted his health. He had no work in hand for 14 months starting from late 1980 to mid of 1982. Srinath whom Puttanna directed in blockbuster films like Shubhamangala and Dharmasere came to his help, and they made Maanasa Sarovara which became an average hit and helped Puttanna bounce back. Kanagal died on 5 June 1985 in Bengaluru while shooting Masanada Hoovu.

Starting his career as a publicity boy, Kanagal was drawn into independent filmmaking after a stint in theatre and working with film director and producer B. R. Panthulu as his assistant. Kanagal's assistants include Tamil directors S. P. Muthuraman, Bharathiraja, and T. S. Nagabharana.

Although a majority of Kanagal's films were on offbeat or taboo subjects, generally women-centric, he endeared himself to both the critics and ordinary film goers alike making "bridge films" between art and commercial cinema. His film in Kannada, Gejje Pooje, based on a novel of the same name by M. K. Indira is considered a landmark film. He would go on to direct other films such as Kappu Bilupu (1969), Sharapanjara (1971), Naagarahaavu (1972), Edakallu Guddada Mele (1973), Shubhamangala (1975) and Ranganayaki (1981), all of which are seen as milestones in Kannada cinema. He also directed a handful of films in Malayalam, Tamil Telugu and Hindi languages.

=== As a director ===
Often credited as a movie-maker much ahead of his times, his first directorial venture was the 1964 Malayalam movie School Master, a remake of his mentor B. R. Panthulu's Kannada classic of the same name He then directed another Malayalam movie Poochakkanni (Cat eyed/Hazel eyed lady) based on the Kannada novel Bekkina Kannu by Triveni. Puttanna's first Kannada film as a director was Bellimoda (Silver Cloud) in 1967. Starring Kalpana and Kalyan Kumar, this movie was a critical and commercial success. Legend has it that Puttanna scouted for a week to find the perfect location for the mellifluous song "Moodala Maneyaa". Belli Moda is credited as the first Kannada movie to be shot exclusively outdoors. He directed many masterpieces like Gejje Pooje, Sharapanjara, Naagarahaavu etc. '. His last film was Savira Mettilu, which never released during his lifetime.

He also provided a platform for many actors such as Kalpana, Aarathi, Leelavathi, Jayanthi, Padma Vasanthi, Srinath, Rajinikanth, Vishnuvardhan, Ambareesh, Jai Jagadish, Chandra Shekhar, Gangadhar, Shivaram, Vajramuni, Sridhar, Ramakrishna and Aparna to showcase their talents.

In devotion to Puttanna, Vishnuvardhan said, "Puttanna Kanagal Sir was the God-sent teacher for me! And I have been made an actor. I am indebted to guru Puttanaji. He used to conceptualize scenes, narrate them to me, inspire me and extract the potential till then unknown to myself. Acting in a single movie under Puttanna's expertise is an experience of a lifetime."

Puttanna introduced most of the actors in the Kannada film industry. Tamil director Bharathiraja worked under him. Each of Kanagal's movies had strong themes filled with unprecedented direction.

Tamil legendary film maker K. Balachander, winner of the 2010 Dadasaheb Phalke Award had great regard for Puttanna. In many of his interviews to the media, Balachandar has stated that he considered a much younger, Puttanna Kanagal, a director from Kannada(Karnataka) film industry to be his guru in film making. An excerpt from one such interview:

Q) You have stated in many interviews that you consider Puttanna Kanagal (Kannada filmmaker), though younger than you, as your guru in filmmaking. What is it that you learnt from him?

A) Age has got nothing to do with learning. You can learn from anybody and everybody. I liked and admired Puttanna Kanagal, because, at the time when many of our filmmakers lacked the vision of filmmaking in terms of visuals he was the one who insisted on films being visual than oral. Apart from that his ability to churn out the human emotions from his actors was one of his kind.

In fact Balachander, for most of the remakes of his Tamil films in Kannada (Benkiyalli Aralida Hoovu, Mouna Geethe) has gone on to cast many of the talents like Ashwath, Sridhar, Jai Jagadesh, Ramakrishna, Srinath, nurtured in Puttanna's camp. Also, both Puttanna's and Balachander's films dealt with the issues on women – more so in Puttanna's films.

=== The Visualiser ===
The Kannada film industry in the 1960s and the 1970s started moving from mythological and historical subjects to socially relevant themes. This metamorphosis was reflected in the rise of bandaaya sahitya or rebellious literature. The New Wave Cinema or Alternate Cinema movement spread across India, particularly in Karnataka, West Bengal and Kerala. Puttanna's movies, however, were seen as a bridge between commercial cinema and alternate cinema. While his plots, based on popular Kannada novels, revolved around strong characters and distinct themes, he added mandatory songs and emotions to distinguish from alternate cinemas. His mastery over symbolism is quite remarkable. He has effectively used effectively in almost all of his movies.

Puttanna was also considered as a pioneer in picturising songs. In general, his movies contained 4–5 songs. Even with respect to song picturisation, Puttanna had a strong sense of colour and imagery. He would go to great lengths to select the locations and costumes for a song. The songs generally reflected the inherent mood of the film. For instance, the song from the movie Manasasarovara, Neene saakida gini, a poignant song, was shot amidst the dust-filled mining areas, thereby reflecting the agony of a man who has lost his true love. Similarly the song sandesha megha sandesha from the movie Sharapanjara was shot in the Madikeri, with innumerable oranges strewn around.

He was well known for his effective use of freeze shots and negative images to heighten the introspective effect of key scenes. Although his films were accused of being too woman-centric, Puttanna personally felt that such notions were wrong.

He was the first director of the Kannada Film Directors Association after its inception in 1984. Poonam Theatre in Jayanagar, Bangalore was renamed in his honor after his last film debuted there. In 2004, the theatre closed until reopening after a 2011 campaign supported by Baraguru Ramachandrappa, V. Manohar and the Democratic Youth Federation of India and was scheduled for demolition in July 2012 but later saved and remodeled. In June 2015, the 30th anniversary of his death was honored with an event organized by the Karnataka Chalanachitra Academy and guests and speakers included Ambareesh, Leelavathi, S. Shivaram, Jai Jagadish, Ashok, K. S. L. Swamy and Rajendra Singh Babu.

== Awards and honours ==
Kanagal received three National Film Awards, three Filmfare Awards South and multiple Karnataka State Film Awards. Karnataka state honours film directors and various personalities with Puttanna Kanagal Award in his memory every year during the Karnataka State Awards function.

=== Filmfare Awards South ===
List of movies, showing the year (award ceremony), film(s), award(s)
Year	Movie	Award	Refs.
21st Filmfare Awards South	Edakallu Guddada Mele	Filmfare Award for Best Director – Kannada	
27th Filmfare Awards South	Dharmasere	Filmfare Award for Best Director – Kannada	
29th Filmfare Awards South	Ranganayaki	Filmfare Award for Best Director – Kannada	

=== National Film Awards ===
List of movies, showing the year (award ceremony), film(s), award(s)
Year	Movie	Award	Refs.
1969 (17th)	Gejje Pooje	Best Screenplay	
1969 (17th)	Gejje Pooje	Best Feature Film in Kannada	
1972 (20th)	Sharapanjara	Best Feature Film in Kannada	

=== Karnataka State Film Awards ===
List of movies, showing the year (award ceremony), film(s), award(s)
Year	Movie	Award	Refs.
1967–68	Belli Moda	Best Film (Second)	
1967–68	Belli Moda	Best Screenplay	
1969–70	Gejje Pooje	Best Film (First)	
1969–70	Gejje Pooje	Best Screenplay	
1970–71	Sharapanjara	Best Film (First)	
1970–71	Sharapanjara	Best Screenplay	
1972–73	Naagarahaavu	Best Film (Second)	
1972–73	Naagarahaavu	Best Screenplay	
1974–75	Upasane	Best Film (First)	
1974–75	Upasane	Best Screenplay	
1975–76	Katha Sangama	Best Film (Fourth)	
1980–81	Ranganayaki	Best Film (First)	
1983–84	Amrutha Ghalige	Best Screenplay	

== Filmography ==
Year	Film	Language	Notes
1964	School Master	Malayalam	
1964	Kalanjukittiya Thankam	Malayalam	
1965	Chettathi	Malayalam	
1965	Pakkalo Ballem	Telugu	
1966	Mayor Nair	Malayalam	
1966	Poochakkanni	Malayalam	Based on the novel Bekkina Kannu by Triveni
1967	Belli Moda	Kannada	
1967	Swapnabhoomi	Malayalam	Remake of Belli Moda (1967)
1968	Palamanasulu	Telugu	Remake of Belli Moda (1967); credited as SSR Sharma
1968	Teacheramma	Tamil	
1969	Mallammana Pavada	Kannada	Based on the novel Ardhaangi by B. Puttaswamayya
1969	Kappu Bilupu	Kannada	Based on novel by Aryambha Pattabhi
1969	Gejje Pooje	Kannada	Based on the novel by M. K. Indira.
1970	Karulina Kare	Kannada	
1971	Sudarum Sooravaliyum	Tamil	
1971	Sharapanjara	Kannada	Based on novel by Triveni.
1971	Sakshatkara	Kannada	
1971	Irulum Oliyum	Tamil	Remake of Kappu Bilupu (1969)
1972	Iddaru Ammayilu	Telugu	Remake of Kappu Bilupu (1969)
1972	Naagarahaavu	Kannada	Based on 3 novels by T. R. Subba Rao: Nagarahavu, Ondu Gandu Eradu Hennu and Sarpa Mathsara
1973	Edakallu Guddada Mele	Kannada	
1974	Upasane	Kannada	
1974	Zehreela Insaan	Hindi	Remake of Naagarahaavu (1972)
1975	Shubhamangala	Kannada	
1975	Bili Hendthi	Kannada	
1976	Katha Sangama	Kannada	Three segments based on three short stories: Hangu by Giraddi Govindaraj, Athithi by Veena and Munithaayi by Eshwara Chandra.
1976	Phalitamsha	Kannada	Based on the story Golagummata by Srinivasa Kulkarni
1976	College Ranga	Kannada	Based on novel by B. G. L. Swamy
1978	Paduvaaralli Pandavaru	Kannada	
1979	Dharmasere	Kannada	Based on novel by Jada Bharata
1981	Ranganayaki	Kannada	Based on novel by Ashwattha
1982	Maanasa Sarovara	Kannada	
1983	Dharani Mandala Madhyadolage	Kannada	
1984	Amrutha Ghalige	Kannada	Based on the novel Avadaana by Dodderi Venkatagiri Rao
1984	Runamukthalu	Kannada	Based on the novel Runa by Anupama Niranjana
1985	Masanada Hoovu	Kannada	Film direction completed by K. S. L. Swamy; Based on the novel by T. R. Subba Rao
2006	Savira Mettilu	Kannada	Shelved in the 1970s. Film direction completed and released in 2006 by K. S. L. Swamy
