= Vani (writer) =

Indian writer (1912–1988)

M. N. Subbamma
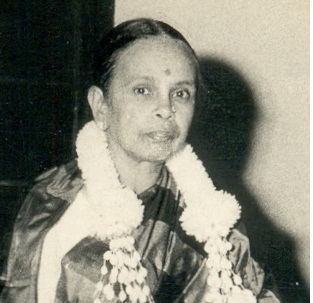
- Vani
- Born: M. N. Subbamma; 1912; Srirangapatna, Kingdom of Mysore, British India
- Died: 1988 (aged 75–76); Mysore, Karnataka, India
- Occupation: Novelist
- Writing career
- Pen name: Vani
- Notable works: Shubhamangala; Eradu Kanasu; Hosa Belaku
- Movement: Navya

Vani (Kannada: ವಾಣಿ; 1912–1988) was a Kannada writer. She was born in Srirangapatna (near Mysore). Her father B. Narasinga Rao was an advocate. She was bestowed the "Rajaseva Saktha" title by Nalvadi Krishna Raja Wodeyer of Mysore Palace. Three of her novels — Shubhamangala, Eradu Kanasu and Hosa Belaku — were made into successful Kannada movies directed by top Kannada directors.

== Novels ==
- Bidugade
- Chinnada Panjara
- Mane Magalu
- Avala Bhagya
- Kaveria Madilalli
- Anjali
- Baleya Neralu
- Anireekshita
- Ale Nele
- Shishiragana
- Hoovu mullu
- Premasethu
- Trishula
- Sulgna Savadhana
- Bale
- Hosa Belaku
- Eradu Kanasu
- Shubhamangala

== Story collections (Kathaa Sankalana) ==
- Kasturi
- Arpane
- Naneya maduve
- Aparupada Attithi
- Babu Bharthane
- Happy Birthday

== Vachana Sangraha ==
- Navanitha

== Awards ==
1. 1962 – Karnataka State Award.
2. 1972 – Karnataka Sahitya Academy Award
