= National Film Award for Best Kannada Feature Film =

Film award in India

- National award for contributions to Indian Cinema
- Awarded for: Best Kannada feature film of the year
- Sponsored by: National Film Development Corporation of India
- Formerly called: President's Silver Medal for Best Feature Film in Kannada (1954–1968); National Film Award for Best Feature Film in Kannada (1969–2021)
- Rewards: Rajat Kamal (Silver Lotus); ₹2,00,000
- First award: 1954
- Most recent winner: Mithya (2024)

The National Film Award for Best Kannada Feature Film is one of the National Film Awards presented annually by the National Film Development Corporation of India. It is one of several awards presented for feature films and awarded with Rajat Kamal (Silver Lotus). Since the 70th National Film Awards, the name has been changed to "Best Kannada Feature Film".

The National Film Awards, established in 1954, are the most prominent film awards in India that merit the best of the Indian cinema. The ceremony also presents awards for films in various regional languages.

Awards for films in seven regional language (Bengali, Hindi, Kannada, Malayalam, Marathi, Tamil and Telugu) started from 2nd National Film Awards which were presented on 21 December 1955. Three awards of "President's Silver Medal for Best Feature Film", "Certificate of Merit for the Second Best Feature Film" and "Certificate of Merit for the Third Best Feature Film" were instituted. The latter two certificate awards were discontinued from 15th National Film Awards (1967).

Directed by H. L. N. Simha, the 1954 film Bedara Kannappa, received the first Certificate of Merit. The film was based on the folktale of the hunter Kannappa who proves his extreme devotion to Shiva by plucking out both of his eyes. However, the first "President's Silver Medal for Best Feature Film in Kannada" was only awarded at the 5th National Film Awards ceremony held on 16 April 1958 to the 1957 film Premada Putri. The film was directed by R. Nagendra Rao and produced under his banner R. N. R. Pictures. Following is the list of Silver Lotus Award (Rajat Kamal) recipient films produced in Kannada language.

== Winners ==
The award includes 'Rajat Kamal' (Silver Lotus Award) and cash prize. Following are the award winners over the years:

Awards legends
*	President's Silver Medal for Best Feature Film
*	Certificate of Merit for the Second Best Feature Film
*	Certificate of Merit for the Third Best Feature Film
*	Certificate of Merit for the Best Feature Film
*	Indicates a joint award for that year

List of award films, showing the year (award ceremony), producer(s) and director(s)
Year	Film(s)	Producer(s)	Director(s)	Refs.
1954 (2nd)	Bedara Kannappa	Gubbi Karnataka Productions	H. L. N. Simha	
1955 (3rd)	Mahakavi Kalidasa	Lalitakala Film Private Ltd.	K. R. Seetharama Sastry	
1956 (4th)	Bhakta Vijaya	Jagannath Productions	A. K. Pattabhi	
1957 (5th)	Premada Putri	R. N. R. Pictures	R. Nagendra Rao	
1958 (6th)	School Master	B. R. Panthulu	B. R. Panthulu	
1959 (7th)	Jagajyothi Basveshwara	G. S. S. Murthy	T. V. Singh Thakur	
1960 (8th)	Bhakta Kanakadasa	D. R. Naidu	Y. R. Swamy	
1961 (9th)	Kittur Chennamma	Padmini Pictures	B. R. Panthulu	
1962 (10th)	Nanda Deepa	U. S. Vadhiraj and U. Jawahar	M. R. Vittal	
1963 (11th)	Santha Thukaram	B. Radhakrishna	Sundar Rao Nadkarni	
1963 (11th)	Mangala Muhurta	U. Subba Rao	M. R. Vittal	
1964 (12th)	Chandavalliya Thota	Pals & Co.	T. V. Singh Thakur	
1964 (12th)	Nava Jeevana	U. S. Vadhiraj, U. Jawahar and Bharathi Chitra	P. S. Moorthy	
1964 (12th)	Mane Aliya	A. Subba Rao	S. K. A. Chari	
1965 (13th)	Sathya Harishchandra	K. V. Reddy	Hunsur Krishnamurthy	
1965 (13th)	Miss Leelavathi	K. S. Jagan Nath	M. R. Vittal	
1965 (13th)	Maduve Madi Nodu	B. Nagi Reddy and Aluri Chakrapani	Hunsur Krishnamurthy	
1966 (14th)	Sandhya Raga	A. C. Narasimha Murthy	A. C. Narasimha Murthy and S. K. Bhagavan	
1967 (15th)	Bangarada Hoovu	B. A. Arasu Kumar	B. A. Arasu Kumar	
1968 (16th)	Mannina Maga	M. V. Vemkatachallam and P. Alexander	Geethapriya	
1969 (17th)	Gejje Pooje	Chithra Jyothi	Puttanna Kanagal	
1970 (18th)	Naguva Hoovu	R. N. Sudarshan	R. N. K. Prasad	
1971 (19th)	Vamsha Vriksha	G. V. Iyer	B. V. Karanth and Girish Karnad	
1972 (20th)	Sharapanjara	C. S. Rajah	Puttanna Kanagal	
1973 (21st)	Abachurina Post Office	Patre C. Vinayak	N. Lakshminarayan	
1974 (22nd)	Kankana	Hamzu Jagalur Imam	M. B. S. Prasad	
1975 (23rd)	Hamsageethe	Anantha Lakshmi Films	G. V. Iyer	
1976 (24th)	Pallavi	K. S. Indira Lankesh	P. Lankesh	
1977 (25th)	Tabbaliyu Neenade Magane	B. M. Venkatesh and Chandulal Jain	Girish Karnad and B. V. Karanth	
1978 (26th)	Ondanondu Kaladalli	L. N. Combines	Girish Karnad	
1979 (27th)	Arivu	K. R. Suresh	Katte Ramachandra	
1980 (28th)	No Award			
1981 (29th)	Bara	M. S. Sathyu	M. S. Sathyu	
1982 (30th)	Phaniyamma	Prema Karanth	Prema Karanth	
1983 (31st)	Banker Margayya	T. S. Narasimhan and B. S. Somasundar	T. S. Nagabharana	
1984 (32nd)	Bandhana	Rohini Pictures	Rajendra Singh Babu	
1985 (33rd)	Bettada Hoovu	Parvathamma Rajkumar	N. Lakshminarayan	
1986 (34th)	Shankha Nada	Umesh Kulkarni	Umesh Kulkarni	
1987 (35th)	Kadina Benki	Manasa Arts	Suresh Heblikar	
1988 (36th)	Bannada Vesha	Doordarshan	Girish Kasaravalli	
1989 (37th)	Mane	Apoorva Chitra and NFDC	Girish Kasaravalli	
1990 (38th)	Muthina Haara	Rajendra Singh Babu	Rajendra Singh Babu	
1991 (39th)	Mysore Mallige	Srihari L. Khodey	T. S. Nagabharana	
1992 (40th)	Harakeya Kuri	B. V. Radha	Lalitha Ravee	
1993 (41st)	Chinnari Mutha	Nagini Nagabharana, Saroja and Nandakumar	T. S. Nagabharana	
1994 (42nd)	Kotreshi Kanasu	G. Nandakumar	Nagathihalli Chandrashekhar	
1995 (43rd)	Kraurya	Nirmala Chitgopi	Girish Kasaravalli	
1996 (44th)	America America	G. Nandakumar	Nagathihalli Chandrashekar	
1997 (45th)	Mungarina Minchu	Jai Jagadish and R. Dushyanth Singh	Rajendra Singh Babu	
1998 (46th)	Hoomale	K. S. Usha Rao	Nagathihalli Chandrashekar	
1999 (47th)	Kanooru Heggadithi	H. G. Narayana, C. M. Narayana and I. P. Mallegowda	Girish Karnad	
2000 (48th)	Mathadana	H. G. Narayana and I. P. Mallegowda	T. N. Seetharam	
2001 (49th)	Atithi	Mitrachitra	P. Sheshadri	
2002 (50th)	Singaaravva	Sandesh Nagaraj	T. S. Nagabharana	
2003 (51st)	Preethi Prema Pranaya	Kavitha Lankesh	Kavitha Lankesh	
2004 (52nd)	Beru	Mitrachitra	P. Sheshadri	
2005 (53rd)	Thaayi	Prameela Joshai	Baraguru Ramachandrappa	
2006 (54th)	Kaada Beladingalu	K. M. Veeresh, K. N. Siddalingaiah and B. S. Lingadevaru	B. S. Lingadevaru	
2007 (55th)	Gulabi Talkies	Basant Kumar Patil	Girish Kasaravalli	
2008 (56th)	Vimukthi	Navyachitra Creations	P. Sheshadri	
2009 (57th)	Kanasemba Kudureyaneri	Basant Kumar Patil	Girish Kasaravalli	
2010 (58th)	Puttakkana Highway	Shylaja Nag and Prakash Raj	B. Suresha	
2011 (59th)	Koormavatara	Basant Kumar Patil	Girish Kasaravalli	
2012 (60th)	Bharath Stores	Basant Productions	P. Sheshadri	
2013 (61st)	December-1	Basant Productions	P. Sheshadri	
2014 (62nd)	Harivu	Om Studio	Manjunath S.	
2015 (63rd)	Thithi	Prospect Productions	Raam Reddy	
2016 (64th)	Reservation	Thotadamane	Nikhil Manjoo	
2017 (65th)	Hebbet Ramakka	Puttaraju S. A.	N. R. Nanjunde Gowda	
2018 (66th)	Nathicharami	Tejaswini Enterprises	Manjunath S.	
2019 (67th)	Akshi	Kaladegula Studio	Manoj Kumar	
2020 (68th)	Dollu	Wadeeyar Movies	Sagar Puranik	
2021 (69th)	777 Charlie	G. S. Gupta and Rakshit Shetty	Kiranraj K.	
2022 (70th)	KGF: Chapter 2	Vijay Kiragandur	Prashanth Neel	
2023 (71st)	Kandeelu	Swastik Entertainment	Yeshoda Prakash Kottukathira	
2024 (72nd)	Mithya	Rakshit Shetty	Sumanth Bhat	
