= R. N. K. Prasad =

Indian filmmaker (c. 1929–2012)

- Born: Rattihalli Nagendra Rao Krishna Prasad; 1929; Mysore, Kingdom of Mysore, British India
- Died: 15 February 2012 (aged 82–83); Chennai, Tamil Nadu, India
- Occupations: Cinematographer, film director, actor
- Spouse: Usha Prasad
- Children: Rajeev Prasad, Mala Rao
- Parent: R. Nagendra Rao
- Family: R. N. Jayagopal (brother); R. N. Sudarshan (brother)
- Website: www.rnjayagopal.com

Rattihalli Nagendra Rao Krishna Prasad (c. 1929 – 15 February 2012) was an Indian cinematographer, actor, director and producer. He was the eldest son of R. Nagendra Rao, considered one of the foremost figures of Kannada cinema.

== Career ==
He was born in 1929 in Mysore. Krishna Prasad directed the Kannada film Naguva Hoovu, starring his younger brother R. N. Sudarshan in the lead. Krishna Prasad won the Karnataka State Award for cinematography three times.

In his later years, Krishna Prasad acted in Tamil films, playing an important supporting role in Michael Madana Kama Rajan (1990) along with his brother R. N. Jayagopal. Krishna Prasad also acted in the Tamil television serial Marmadesam.

== Filmography ==
=== As a cinematographer ===
- Premada Putri (1957)
- Vijayanagarada Veeraputhra (1961)
- Naandi (1964)
- Nanna Kartavya (1965)
- Belli Moda (1967)
- Dhoomakethu (1968)
- Kadina Rahasya (1969)
- Arishina Kunkuma (1970)
- Naguva Hoovu (1971; also director)
- Bhale Adrushtavo Adrushta (1971)
- Kesarina Kamala (1973)
- Seethe Alla Savithri (1973)
- Uravu Solla Oruvan (1975) (Tamil)
- Kavikkuyil (1977) (Tamil)
- Chittu Kuruvi (1978) (Tamil)
- Rosappu Ravikkaikari (1979) (Tamil)
- Mutthu Ondu Mutthu (1979)
- Mareyada Haadu (1981)
- Avala Antharanga (1984)
- Rusi (1984) (Tamil)
- Aagaya Thamaraigal (1985) (Tamil)
- Hrudaya Pallavi (1987)

=== As an actor ===
Films

- All films are in Tamil, unless otherwise noted.

Year	Film	Role
1987	Nayakan	Reddy brother
1990	Michael Madana Kama Rajan	Venugopal
1992	Thambi Pondatti	
1992	Pudhusa Padikkiren Paattu	
1994	Pathavi Pramanam	President of India
1995	Raasaiyya	Groom's father
1995	Ragasiya Police	
1996	Sivasakthi	R. N. K. Prasad
1996	Subash	Indian Army General

Television

Year	Film	Role	Channel	Language
1996	Marmadesam - Ragasiyam	Govindarajan G.	Sun TV	Tamil
2002–2006	Nagamma	Ravi's father	Gemini TV	Telugu

== Awards and nominations ==
- 1967–68 Karnataka State Film Awards: Best Cinematographer - Belli Moda (won)
- 1980–81 Karnataka State Film Awards: Best Cinematographer - Mareyada Haadu (won)
- 1984–85 Karnataka State Film Awards: Best Cinematographer - Avala Antharanga (won)
