= Naandi (film) =

- Directed by: N. Lakshminarayan
- Written by: N. Lakshminarayan
- Produced by: Vadiraj; Jawahar
- Starring: Dr. Rajkumar; Harini; Kalpana; Udaykumar
- Cinematography: R. N. K. Prasad
- Edited by: P. S. Murthy
- Music by: Vijaya Bhaskar
- Production company: Sri Bharathi Chitra
- Release date: 1964
- Running time: 154 minutes
- Country: India
- Language: Kannada

Naandi ( transl. Prologue) is a 1964 Kannada-language romantic drama film directed and written by N. Lakshminarayan, making his directional debut. The film was produced by actor Vadiraj and Jawahar for Sri Bharathi Chitra studio. It stars Dr. Rajkumar and Harini along with Kalpana and Udaykumar in guest roles. Actor Dinesh made his debut in a supporting role.

Upon its release, the film garnered wide appreciation and recognition for being the first to depict real-time struggles of individuals with hearing impairments in commercial cinema. The film also set a landmark by becoming the first Kannada film to be screened at an International film festival. It was featured in the 1992 Kannada cinema Retrospective at the International Film Festival of India (IFFI). One critic has called it the first "offbeat" movie in Kannada cinema.

== Cast ==
- Dr. Rajkumar as Murthy
- Harini as Ganga
- Kalpana as Nirmala
- Udaykumar (cameo)
- Balakrishna as Sitapathi
- Sorat Ashwath as Ramayya
- Ganapathi Bhat
- B. Hanumanthachar
- Dinesh as Gopal Rao
- H. R. Hanumantha Rao
- Sridhar
- Narayana
- P. Vadiraj as Pranesha
- M. Jayashree as Savitri
- R. T. Rama as Murthy's neighbour
- Shanthamma as Seetha
- Suma (credited as Baby Suma)
- Anitha (credited as Baby Anitha)
- Makeup Subbanna
- Mary Bosh as herself (credited as Sister Mary Bosh)

== Soundtrack ==
The music was composed by Vijaya Bhaskar with lyrics by R. N. Jayagopal. All the songs from the film were widely appreciated and are considered evergreen classics.

Track listing
No.	Title	Lyrics	Singer(s)	Length
1.	"Namma Thayi Bharathi"	R. N. Jayagopal	P. B. Sreenivas	03:16
2.	"Chandramukhi Pranasakhi"	R. N. Jayagopal	S. Janaki, Bangalore Latha	03:35
3.	"Haadonda Haaduve"	R. N. Jayagopal	P. B. Sreenivas	03:24
4.	"Udugoreyonda Thanda"	R. N. Jayagopal	S. Janaki	03:12
5.	"Sathyakke Endigu Jayavemba"	R. N. Jayagopal	P. B. Sreenivas, S. Janaki
6.	"Namma Papa Muddu Papa"	R. N. Jayagopal	L. R. Eswari
