= 18th National Film Awards =

Indian ceremony celebrating cinema of 1970

- 18th National Film Awards
- Awarded for: Best of Indian cinema in 1970
- Awarded by: Ministry of Information and Broadcasting
- Presented by: V. V. Giri (President of India)
- Site: Bombay
- Official website: dff.nic.in

Highlights
- Best Feature Film: Samskara
- Dadasaheb Phalke Award: B. N. Sircar
- Most awards: • Dastak • Mera Naam Joker • Pratidwandi (3)

The 18th National Film Awards were held in Chennai, India in November 1971 by the Indian Ministry of Information and Broadcasting for Indian films released in 1970. The awards were presented by then President of India, V. V. Giri.

== Juries ==
The award winners were chosen by four juries, one each for the Bombay, Calcutta and Madras regions and a central jury for all India. For the 18th National Film Awards the central jury was headed by Justice G. D. Khosla.

- Jury Members: Central
  - G. D. Khosla (Chair) • Shiela Vats • Teji Bachchan • V. K. Narayana Menon • Ashis Burman • Ali Sardar Jafri • Ammu Swaminathan • Din Dayal • Nasir Hussain • U. Visweswar Rao • Subodh Mitra
- Regional Jury: Bombay
  - Vijay Tendulkar (chair) • Firoze Rangoonwalla • Bikram Singh • K. K. Hebbar • Irene Heredia • Ismat Chughtai • L. G. Jog • Gopinath Talwalkar • Devendra Goel • Shatrujit Paul • Bhappi Sonie
- Regional Jury: Calcutta
  - Amala Shankar (chair) • Amina Kar • Anant Mahapatra • A. K. Pramanick • Tarun Roy • Pankaj Mullick • Rajendra Nath Barua • Shibatosh Mukerjee • Narayan Chakraborty • Dilip Sarkar • Nirmal Chowdhury
- Regional Jury: Madras
  - C. R. Pattabhiraman (chair) • K. Venkataswamy Naidu • P. P. Naidu • Mallikarjuna Rao • Shakuntala Hegde • D. Ramanaidu • Vijayalakshmi • V. C. Subburaman • Kambisseri Karunakaran • C. N. Ramanujam • T. S. Muthuswamy • K. Kottarakkara

== Awards ==
Awards were given to feature films and non-feature films.

The top national award in each category was the President's gold medal and, at the regional level, the President's silver medal.

=== Lifetime Achievement Award ===
Award	Image	Awardee(s)	Awarded As	Cash prize
Dadasaheb Phalke Award		B. N. Sircar	Producer	₹11,000, a shawl and a plaque

=== Feature films ===
The Kannada film Samskara won the President's gold medal for the All India Best Feature Film. Three award each went to the Hindi films, Dastak and Mera Naam Joker, and to the Bengali film Pratidwandi.

==== All India Award ====
Award recipients:

Award	Film	Language	Awardee(s)	Cash prize
Best Feature Film	Samskara	Kannada	Producer: T. Pattabhirami Reddy	Gold Medal and ₹40,000
Best Feature Film	Samskara	Kannada	Director: T. Pattabhirami Reddy	Gold Medal and ₹40,000
Second Best Feature Film	Pratidwandi	Bengali	Producer: Nepal Dutta	₹15,000 and a medal
Second Best Feature Film	Pratidwandi	Bengali	Producer: Asim Dutta	₹15,000 and a medal
Second Best Feature Film	Pratidwandi	Bengali	Director: Satyajit Ray	₹5,000 and a plaque
Best Feature Film on National Integration	Thurakkatha Vaathil	Malayalam	Producer: A. Raghunath	₹30,000 and a medal
Best Feature Film on National Integration	Thurakkatha Vaathil	Malayalam	Director: P. Bhaskaran	₹10,000 and a plaque
Best Actor (Bharat Award)	Dastak	Hindi	Sanjeev Kumar	A figurine
Best Actress (Urvashi Award)	Dastak	Hindi	Rehana Sultan	A figurine
Best Child Artist	Mera Naam Joker	Hindi	Rishi Kapoor	A plaque
Best Direction	Pratidwandi	Bengali	Satyajit Ray	₹ 5,000 and a plaque
Best Music Direction	Dastak	Hindi	Madan Mohan	₹ 5,000 and a plaque
Best Male Playback Singer	Nishi Padma (For the song "Ja Khushi Ora Bole")	Bengali	Manna Dey	A plaque
Best Male Playback Singer	Mera Naam Joker (For the song "Ae Bhai Zara Dekh Ke Chalo")	Hindi	Manna Dey	A plaque
Best Female Playback Singer	Nishi Padma (For the song "Ore Sakol Sona Molin Holo")	Bengali	Sandhya Mukherjee	A plaque
Best Female Playback Singer	Jay Jayanti (For the song "Amader Chhuti Chhuti")	Bengali	Sandhya Mukherjee	A plaque
Best Screenplay	Pratidwandi	Bengali	Satyajit Ray	₹5,000 and a plaque
Best Cinematography (Black and White)	Uski Roti	Hindi	K. K. Mahajan	₹5,000 and a plaque
Best Cinematography (Color)	Mera Naam Joker	Hindi	Radhu Karmakar	₹5,000 and a plaque

==== Regional Award ====
The awards were given to the best films made in the regional languages of India. For feature films in Assamese, English, Gujarati, Kashmiri, Oriya and Punjabi language, the resident's silver medal for Best Feature Film was not given. The producer and director of the film were awarded with ₹5,000 and a silver medal, respectively.

Award	Film	Awardee(s)	
Award	Film	Producer	Director
Best Feature Film in Bengali	Malyadan	Ajoy Kar	Ajoy Kar
Best Feature Film in Bengali	Malyadan	Bimal Dey	Ajoy Kar
Best Feature Film in Hindi	Anand	Hrishikesh Mukherjee	Hrishikesh Mukherjee
Best Feature Film in Hindi	Anand	N. C. Sippy	Hrishikesh Mukherjee
Best Feature Film in Kannada	Naguva Hoovu	R. N. Sudarshan	R. N. K. Prasad
Best Feature Film in Malayalam	Ezhuthatha Katha	Jai Maruthy Pictures	A. B. Raj
Best Feature Film in Marathi	Mumbaicha Jawai	Tushar Pradhan	Raja Thakur
Best Feature Film in Tamil	Raman Ethanai Ramanadi	P. Madhavan	P. Madhavan
Best Feature Film in Telugu	Desamante Manushuloyi	K. M. K. Naidu	C. S. Rao
Best Feature Film in Telugu	Desamante Manushuloyi	G. K. Naidu	C. S. Rao

=== Non-Feature films ===
The award recipients were:

==== Short films ====
Name of Award	Name of Film	Language	Awardee(s)	Awards
Best Film on Social Documentation	Latest	English	Producer: M/s. Film-O-Pub	₹5,000 and a medal
Best Film on Social Documentation	Latest	English	Director: Biplab Ray Chaudhari	₹2,000 and a plaque

=== Awards not given ===
The following awards not given:

- Best Story Writer
- Best Film on Family Welfare
- Best Children's Film
- Lyric Writer of the Best Film Song on National Integration
- Best Information Film (Documentary)
- Best Educational / Instructional Film
- Best Promotional Film
- Best Experimental Film
- Best Animation Film
- President's silver medal for Best Feature Film in Assamese
- President's silver medal for Best Feature Film in English
- President's silver medal for Best Feature Film in Oriya
- President's silver medal for Best Feature Film in Punjabi
