= Mahasathi Arundathi =

- Directed by: Aruru Pattabhi
- Produced by: B. V. Reddy
- Starring: Rajkumar; Kalpana; Udaykumar; Arun Kumar
- Cinematography: H. S. Venu
- Music by: K. S. Ashwathama
- Production company: Sanjeevi Pictures
- Distributed by: Sanjeevi Pictures
- Release date: 1 February 1968
- Country: India
- Language: Kannada

Mahasathi Arundathi is a 1968 Indian Kannada-language film, directed by Aruru Pattabhi and produced by B. V. Reddy. The film stars Rajkumar, Kalpana, Udaykumar and Arun Kumar. The musical score was composed by K. S. Ashwathama.

== Cast ==
- Rajkumar as Vasishtha
- Kalpana
- Udaykumar
- Arun Kumar as Narada
