= Anbe Deivam =

- Theatrical release poster
- Directed by: R. Nagendra Rao
- Screenplay by: T. U. Pathi
- Story by: R. N. Jayagopal
- Produced by: R. Nagendra Rao
- Starring: R. Nagendra Rao; M. K. Radha; K. Sarangapani; Sriranjani Jr.
- Cinematography: R. N. K. Prasath
- Music by: H. R. Padmanabha Sastry, Vijaya Baskar
- Production company: R. N. R. Pictures
- Distributed by: Shankar Films
- Release date: 6 December 1957
- Country: India
- Language: Tamil

Anbe Deivam (transl. Love is God) is a 1957 Indian Tamil-language drama film directed by R. Nagendra Rao. The film stars him alongside M. K. Radha, K. Sarangapani and Sriranjani Jr. It was released on 6 December 1957. The film was simultaneously shot in Kannada as Premada Putri with a slightly different cast.

== Plot ==
Mohan Rao is a film producer who lives with his wife. A couple and their daughter Uma live in the neighbourhood. The husband is a rogue who plans to rob the film producer. While he is executing his plan he kills someone. His wife takes the blame, but both are imprisoned. Mohan Rao and his wife adopt Uma. Time goes by and Uma becomes a young woman. She is in love with a youth who is the son of a police officer. Uma's parents are released and they return home. Her father observes that Uma is living comfortably and that she is going to marry. He tries to blackmail Mohan Rao and get money. Uma's marriage is fixed. On the wedding day her father tries to create problems in order to stop the marriage. How he is exposed and how Uma's wedding takes place forms the rest of the story.

== Cast ==
The list was adapted from the review article in The Hindu

Male cast

- R. Nagendra Rao
- M. K. Radha
- C. V. V. Panthulu
- K. Sarangapani
- V. Gopalakrishnan
- Ganapathi Bhat
- P. D. Sambandam

Female cast

- Sriranjani Jr.
- N. R. Sandhya
- Suryakala
- K. S. Angamuthu
- Baby Uma
- T. E. Krishnamachari
- Pottai Krishnamurthi

Dance
E. V. Saroja, Thangappan, Ganga, Madhavi

== Soundtrack ==
The music was composed by H. R. Padmanabha Sastry & Vijaya Bhaskar. Lyrics were penned by Sundarakannan.

| Song | Singers | Length |
|---|---|---|
| Atthaanai Engeyum Paartheengalaa | Seerkazhi Govindarajan & P. Leela | 06:13 |
| Inbamellaam Thandharulum | P. Susheela | 02:41 |

== Reception ==
Anbe Deivam was released on 6 December 1957, by Shankar Films. On the same day, The Indian Express called it a "technically flawless picture" and praised the music. Despite this, it was not a success.
