= Madhu Malathi =

- Directed by: S. K. A. Chari
- Written by: S. K. A. Chari
- Screenplay by: S. K. A. Chari
- Produced by: M. Sampath
- Starring: Rajkumar; Udaykumar; Arun Kumar; Bharathi Vishnuvardhan
- Cinematography: B. Dorairaj
- Edited by: B. Harinarayanaiah
- Music by: G. K. Venkatesh
- Production company: Trimurthy Films
- Distributed by: Trimurthy Films
- Release date: 18 October 1966
- Country: India
- Language: Kannada

Madhu Malathi is a 1966 Indian Kannada-language romantic drama film directed by S. K. A. Chari and produced by M. Sampath. The film stars Rajkumar, Udaykumar, Arun Kumar and Bharathi Vishnuvardhan. The musical score was composed by G. K. Venkatesh.

The title card credits the story to the director, noting that it was based on a book by Bhavabhuti. The story traces its origins to the ancient Indian drama Mālatīmādhava by Bhavabhuti (c. 8th-century) and later became one of the popular Vikram - Vetal stories from Vetala Panchavimshati, a Sanskrit work whose earliest recensions are found in Kathasaritsagara written by Somadeva (c. 11th-century).

The film was dubbed as Vedhalan Sonna Kathai in Tamil . The film features characteristics of swashbuckler films with the three male leads playing swashbucklers and the sole female lead portraying a damsel in distress. This was the first film where Bharathi was paired with Rajkumar.

== Cast ==
- Rajkumar as Trivikramasena
- Udaykumar as Vamana Dutta
- Arun Kumar as Madhusudana Sharma
- Bharathi Vishnuvardhan as Madhu Malathi
- K. S. Ashwath as Keshava Chandragupta
- M. P. Shankar as Gurubhairava (Villain)
- Kuppuraj
- Ranga
- M. Jayashree as Gajalakshmi
- B. R. Hema
- R. Nagendra Rao in a guest appearance
- Girimaji
- Anantharam Maccheri
- Keshavamurthy
- Lakshmayya
- Narayan
- Shyamsundar
- Honnappa
- Stunt Rathnam

== Production and release ==
J. Jayalalithaa was initially chosen for the lead actress role, but she was unable to take up the movie due to production delays and scheduling conflicts with her Tamil movie commitments. This film was the inaugural film for Sangam Theatre, Majestic, where it had a six-week run. In its second run, it was released in Triveni theatre in 1968.
