= Geethapriya =

Indian film maker and lyricist (1932–2016)

- Born: Lakshman Rao Mohite; 15 June 1932
- Died: 17 January 2016 (aged 83); Bangalore, Karnataka, India
- Occupations: Lyricist, writer, film director

Lakshman Rao Mohite (15 June 1932 – 17 January 2016), better known by his pen-name Geethapriya, was an Indian film director and lyricist of the Kannada film industry. He directed 40 films and penned over 250 songs in Kannada films. In 1992–93, he was awarded the Puttanna Kanagal Award for his contribution to Kannada cinema as a director.

== Early life ==
Geethapriya was born as Lakshman Rao Mohite in 1931, to Ramarao Mohite and Lakshmibai. His father worked for the cavalry regiment of Mysore State Troops called Mysore Lancers, which was stationed in Bangalore. Even though his mother tongue was Marathi, he was always interested in the Kannada language and was admitted to a Kannada-medium school. The poet P. T. Narasimhachar lived in the same quarters as Geethapriya's family and was a huge influence in the latter's career. He was also inspired by the writings of K. Shivaram Karanth, Masti Venkatesh Iyengar, T. R. Subba Rao and A. N. Krishna Rao. He tried his hand in writing from his middle school days and sent his poems and short stories to magazines like Thaayinaadu, Ramarajya.

Following his completion of CA intermediate, Geethapriya took up small writing assignments. He then worked as a clerk in Cubbon Park restaurant, Bangalore where he received a monthly salary of ₹35. On account of his brief association with theatre, the music director Vijaya Bhaskar and film director M. B. Singh were his friends. On Bhaskar's promise of paying him ₹40 a month, Geethapriya joined films as a lyricist in 1954.

Geethapriya suffered from various health issues during the last few years of his life. A combination of health complications resulted in a heart attack that caused his death on 17 Jan 2016.

== Career ==
=== As lyricist ===
Geethapriya started his career in films in 1954 as a lyricist, writing a song for the film, Sri Rama Pooja. He then moved to Madras (now Chennai). He worked with Y. V. Rao for the film Bhagya Chakra (1956) by writing dialogues and songs. Sri Ramanjaneya Yuddha (1963) became hit with songs like "Jagadishanaduva Jagave Natakaranga" and eleven others all whose lyrics were written by Geethapriya. This was followed by "Aadutiruva Modagale" for the film Bettada Huli (1965) and Onde Balliya Hoogalu (1967) for which Mohammed Rafi sang "Neenelli Nadeve Doora", the only song sung by him for a Kannada film.

=== As director ===
Geethapriya directed his first film in 1968 with Mannina Maga that had Rajkumar and Kalpana playing the lead roles. It was awarded the National Film Award for Best Feature Film in Kannada and he won the Karnataka State Film Award for Best Screenplay. The film ran for a hundred days in Bangalore's Kapali and Bharat theatres.

He directed other successful films like Yaava Janmada Maithri, (1972), Beluvalada Madilalli (1975), Besuge (1976), Hombisilu (1978), Putani Agent 123 (1979) and Mouna Geethe (1985). Having directed 40 films during his career, he was awarded the Puttanna Kanagal Award for expertise in direction. He also directed three Tulu language films and one Hindi film, Anmol Sitaare.

== Filmography ==
=== Direction ===
Year	Film	Credited as		Language	Notes
Year	Film	Director	Writer	Language	Notes
1968	Mannina Maga	✓	✓	Kannada	National Film Award for Best Feature Film in Kannada
1969	Kadina Rahasya	✓	✓	Kannada	
1969	Maduve Maduve Maduve	✓	✓	Kannada	
1970	Bhoopathi Ranga	✓	✓	Kannada	
1971	Kalyani	✓	✓	Kannada	
1972	Nari Munidare Mari	✓	✓	Kannada	
1972	Yaava Janmada Maitri	✓	✓	Kannada	
1972	Jeevana Jokali	✓	✓	Kannada	
1975	Beluvalada Madilalli	✓	✓	Kannada	
1976	Besuge	✓	✓	Kannada	
1978	Hombisilu	✓	✓	Kannada	
1978	Anuraga Bandhana	✓	✓	Kannada	
1978	Premayana	✓	✓	Kannada	
1979	Putani Agent 123	✓	✓	Kannada	
1980	Prema Jwala	✓	✓	Kannada	
1981	Prachanda Putanigalu	✓	✓	Kannada	
1981	Baalu Bangara	✓	✓	Kannada	
1981	Preetisi Nodu	✓	✓	Kannada	
1982	Jodi Jeeva	✓	✓	Kannada	
1982	Suvarna Sethuve	✓	✓	Kannada	
1982	Anmol Sitaare	✓	✓	Hindi	
1983	Manege Banda Mahalakshmi	✓	✓	Kannada	
1984	Shubha Muhurtha	✓	✓	Kannada	
1986	Mouna Geethe	✓	✓	Kannada	
1986	Manasa Veene	✓	✓	Kannada	
1988	Baalondu Baavageethe	✓	✓	Kannada	
1991	Durgashtami	✓	✓	Kannada	
2003	Shravana Sambhrama	✗	✓	Kannada	

== Lyrics ==
Song	Movie name	Year
Jagadishanaduva Jagave Natakaranga	Sriramanjaneya Yuddam	1963
Hanumana Prana Prabho Raghurama	Sriramanjaneya Yuddam	1963
Aduthiruva Modagale	Bettada Huli	1965
Anna Ninna Sodhariyanna	Onde Balliya Hoogalu	1967
Neenelli Nadeva Doora(Sung by Mohammed Rafi)	Onde Balliya Hoogalu	1967
Bhagavantha Kai Kotta Dudiyokantha	Mannina Maga	1968
Idhena Sabyathe Idhena Samskrithi	Mannina Maga	1968
Nagutha Hadale Alutha Hadale	Uyyale	1969
Manava Nagarika Manava	Boopathi Ranga	1970
Veena Ninageko Yee Kampana	Kalyani	1971
Modake Sikkithu Andha Andha	Kalyani	1971
Matheya Mamatheya Roopugale	Naari Munidhare Maari	1972
Nammurange Nanobne Jaana	Naari Munidhare Maari	1972
Gopilola Hey Gopala	Naari Munidhare Maari	1972
Nade Nade Nade Manave	Hrudaya Sangama	1972
Belavaladha Madilalli Bevara Hani Biddaga	Beluvaladha Madilalli	1975
Ellaran Kayo Devre Neenu Elli Kunthiddhe	Beluvaladha Madilalli	1975
Mutthu Malegaagi Hoththu Kadidhe	Beluvaladha Madilalli	1975
Gudiyaliruva Shilegalla Devaranthe	Makkala Bhagya	1976
Besuge Besuge Jeevanavella(Besuge word 64 times used in this song)	Besuge	1976
Jeeva Veene Needu Midithadha Sangeetha	Hombisilu	1978
Hoovinda Hoovige Haruva Dhumbi	Hombisilu	1978
"Premavide Manedha Nagutha"	Antha	1981
Balli Hoovigaasare	Preetisi Nodu	1981
Duddu Idhre Jagavella	Sidideddha Sahodhara	1983
Love Me Ennuva Vayassu	Asha	1983
Naguva Hoova neenu	Mouna Geetha	1986
Aasegala Lokadali	Kavya	1995

== Awards ==
- 1968 – National Film Award for Best Feature Film in Kannada – Mannina Maga
- Puttanna Kanagal Award from Karnataka Government
- 2012 – Saroja Devi Award
- 2012 – Sandesha Award
