= 1980–81 Karnataka State Film Awards =

Annual Indian film awards ceremony

The Karnataka State Film Awards 1980–81, presented by Government of Karnataka, felicitated the best of Kannada Cinema releases in the year 1980.

== Film awards ==
Name of Award	Film	Producer	Director
First Best Film	Ranganayaki	B. Thimmanna	S. R. Puttanna Kanagal
Second Best Film	Mooru Darigalu	N. S. Devi Prasad	Girish Kasaravalli
Third Best Film	Sangeetha	Wheel Productions	Chandrashekhara Kambara

== Other awards ==
Name of Award	Film	Awardee(s)
Best Direction	Ranganayaki	S. R. Puttanna Kanagal
Best Actor	Sri Raghavendra Vaibhava	Srinath
Best Actress	Ranganayaki	Aarathi
Best Supporting Actor	Ranganayaki	Ramakrishna
Best Supporting Actress	Sangeetha	Pramila Joshai
Best Child Actor	Rama Lakshmana	Master Sathyaprakash
Best Music Direction	Sangeetha	Chandrashekhara Kambara
Best Cinematography	• Mareyada Haadu • Mooru Darigalu	• R. N. K. Prasad • S. R. Bhat
Best Editing	Mooru Darigalu	Suresh Urs
Best Sound Recording	Hanthakana Sanchu	A. Govinda Swamy
Best Story Writer	Sangeetha	Chandrashekhara Kambara
Best Screenplay	Mooru Darigalu	Girish Kasaravalli
Best Dialogue Writer	Sangeetha	Chandrashekhara Kambara
