= Hannele Chiguridaga =

- Directed by: M. R. Vittal
- Written by: Triveni
- Screenplay by: M. R. Vittal
- Based on: Hannele Chiguridaga by Triveni
- Produced by: Srikanth Nahata; Srikanth Patel
- Starring: Rajkumar; Kalpana; R. Nagendra Rao
- Cinematography: Srikanth; Kumar
- Edited by: S. P. N. Krishna; T. P. Velayudham
- Music by: M. Ranga Rao
- Production companies: Srikanth & Srikanth Enterprises
- Release date: 1968
- Running time: 131 minutes
- Country: India
- Language: Kannada

Hannele Chiguridaga ( transl. When the old leaf rejuvenated) is a 1968 Indian Kannada-language film directed by M. R. Vittal and produced by Srikanth Enterprises. The film stars Rajkumar, R. Nagendra Rao and Kalpana. The film is based on the novel of the same name by Triveni and deals with the empowerment of women in education and also issues around widow marriage.

The original score and soundtrack were composed by M. Ranga Rao and had lyrics written by R. N. Jayagopal. The film won several awards after release including the Karnataka State Film Award for First Best Film.

== Cast ==
- R. Nagendra Rao as Anantha Rao
- Dr. Rajkumar as Prasad
- Kalpana as Malathi
- Arun Kumar as Shivanand
- Dinesh as Keshava
- Ranga as Madhava
- B. V. Radha
- M. Jayashree
- Papamma as Raji
- Pradhan
- Vijaykumar
- Indira George
- Baby Rani as Manju
- Premalatha as Jayanthi, a stage actress

== Soundtrack ==
Hannele Chiguridaga

Soundtrack album by M. Ranga Rao
- Released: 1968
- Genre: Feature film soundtrack
- Length: 22:01
- Label: Saregama

The soundtrack music was composed by M. Ranga Rao, and lyrics written by R. N. Jayagopal. The album has six tracks.

Track listing
No.	Title	Lyrics	Singer(s)	Length
1.	"Hoovu Cheluvella"	R. N. Jayagopal	P. Susheela	3:37
2.	"Baara Olidu Baara"	R. N. Jayagopal	P. Susheela	3:34
3.	"Ide Hudugi Ide Bedagi"	R. N. Jayagopal	P. B. Sreenivas, P. Susheela	3:31
4.	"Haalalli Mindavalo"	R. N. Jayagopal	M. Balamuralikrishna	3:57
5.	"Malle Malle"	R. N. Jayagopal	P. Susheela, L. R. Eswari	3:41
6.	"Malle Malle"	R. N. Jayagopal	L. R. Eswari	3:41
Total length:				22:01

== Awards ==
1968–69 Karnataka State Film Awards

- First Best Film
- Best Actor – R. Nagendra Rao
- Best Actress – Kalpana
- Best Music Director – M. Ranga Rao
- Best Story Writer – Triveni
