= Naguva Hoovu =

- Directed by: R. N. K. Prasad
- Written by: Shylashri
- Produced by: R. N. Sudarshan
- Starring: Sudarshan; Shylashri; K. S. Ashwath
- Cinematography: R. N. K. Prasad
- Edited by: Venkatraman; Ramesh
- Music by: G. K. Venkatesh
- Production company: Sri Sudarshan Chitralaya
- Release date: 1971
- Running time: 139 mins
- Country: India
- Language: Kannada

Naguva Hoovu (transl. The Smiling Flower) is a 1971 Indian Kannada language film, directed by R. N. K. Prasad, produced by actor R. N. Sudarshan and written by actress Shylashri. Besides Sudarshan and Shylashri, the film stars K. S. Ashwath, Ranga, R. Nagendra Rao and B. V. Radha in pivotal roles. The film won the National Film Award for Best Feature Film in Kannada at the 18th National Film Awards. G. K. Venkatesh composed the musical score and soundtrack, to the lyrics of R. N. Jayagopal.

== Cast ==
- Sudarshan
- Shylashri
- Ranga
- K. S. Ashwath
- R. Nagendra Rao
- B. V. Radha
- Balakrishna
- Ganapathi Bhat
- Thoogudeepa Srinivas
- Vijayasree
- B. Jayashree
- Master Chandrashekar
- Hanumanthachar
- Vijayakumar
- B. Jaya

== Soundtrack ==
Title	Singers	Lyrics
"Gulaabi Oh Gulaabi"	P. Susheela	R. N. Jayagopal
"Onde Ondu Hoovu"	P. B. Sreenivas, S. Janaki	R. N. Jayagopal
"Ee Shubhadinade"	P. Susheela	R. N. Jayagopal
"Irabeku Irabeku"	Sudarshan	R. N. Jayagopal

== Awards ==
- 1970-71 - National Film Award for Best Feature Film in Kannada

This film screened at IFFI 1992 Kannada cinema Retrospect.
