= Namma Makkalu =

- Directed by: R. Nagendra Rao
- Written by: V. D. Gopalakrishna
- Screenplay by: R.N. Jayagopal
- Produced by: Harini
- Starring: K. S. Ashwath; Pandari Bai; KM Jayashree (Rohini); Cudavalli Chandrashekar; Amarnath
- Cinematography: V. Manohar
- Edited by: P. S. Murthy
- Music by: Vijaya Bhaskar
- Production company: Vijaya Bharathi
- Distributed by: Vijaya Bharathi
- Release date: 20 February 1969
- Running time: 122 minutes
- Country: India
- Language: Kannada

Namma Makkalu ( transl. Our Children) is a 1969 Indian Kannada film, directed by R. Nagendra Rao and produced by Harini. The film stars Cudavalli Chandrashekar, K. S. Ashwath, Pandari Bai, KM Jayashree, and Amarnath in the lead roles. The film has musical score by Vijaya Bhaskar.

== Cast ==
- K. S. Ashwath
- Pandari Bai
- Cudavalli Chandrashekar
- KM Jayashree
- Amarnath
- Balakrishna in Guest Appearance
- Adavani Lakshmidevi
- Kalpana in Guest Appearance
- Nagaraj
- Rajaram
- Saroja
- Sarvamangala
- R. Nagendra Rao
- Ramadevi
- Vadiraj
- Indrani
- Rajashekar
- Shivaram in Guest Appearance
- Lilitha
- Nagesh
- B. Jaya
- Niyogi
- Anuradha
- Govinda
- N. S. Vaman in Guest Appearance
- Rajananda
- Bhaskar
- Ramakrishnaraju

== Awards ==
- The film won Filmfare Award for Best Film – Kannada (1969)

== Soundtrack ==
The music was composed by Vijaya Bhaskar.

No.	Song	Singers	Lyrics	Length (m:ss)
1	"Manase Nagaleke"	S. Janaki	R. N. Jayagopal	03:02
2	"Tharegala Thotadinda"	S. Janaki	R. N. Jayagopal	03:33
3	"Ninnolume Namagirali Tande"	S. Janaki, B. K. Sumitra	R. N. Jayagopal	03:33
