= Premakkoo Permitte =

- Directed by: R. Nagendra Rao
- Written by: Shivakumar; R. N. Jayagopal (dialogues)
- Produced by: Harini
- Starring: Kalyan Kumar; Kalpana; Narasimharaju; Jr. Revathi
- Cinematography: V. Manohar
- Edited by: P. S. Murthy
- Music by: Vijaya Bhaskar
- Production company: Premier Studio
- Release date: 22 December 1967
- Country: India
- Language: Kannada

Premakkoo Permitte ( transl. Permit for love as well?) is a 1967 Indian Kannada-language film, directed by R. Nagendra Rao and produced by Harini. The film stars Kalyan Kumar, Kalpana, Narasimharaju and Jr. Revathi.

== Cast ==
- Kalyan Kumar as Diwakar
- Kalpana as Viji
- Narasimharaju as Ramesh, Viji's brother
- Jr. Revathi
- Arun Kumar
- Kumari Lalitha
- R. Nagendra Rao as Viji and Ramesh's father
- Dinesh
- H. R. Shastry
- P. Vadiraj as Gajapathi
- B. Ramadevi
- B. Kamalamma
- Indrani
- U. Mahabala Rao
- Srinivas
- Guruswamy
- Udupi Jayaram
- G. M. Nanjappa
- Venkataramaiah

== Soundtrack ==
The music was composed by Vijaya Bhaskar.

No.	Song	Singers	Lyrics	Length (m:ss)
1	"Mugulu Nageya"	P. Susheela	R. N. Jayagopal	03:40
2	"Premakkoo Permitte"	P. B. Sreenivas	R. N. Jayagopal	03:36
3	"Premisona Baara"	P. B. Sreenivas, S. Janaki	R. N. Jayagopal	03:55
4	"Usire Odala Thoreyuveya"	P. Susheela	R. N. Jayagopal	03:23
5	"Yechcharavirabeku"	S. Janaki	R. N. Jayagopal	03:14
6	"Kempu Roja Mogadavale"	P. B. Sreenivas	R. N. Jayagopal	03:23
