= Vijayanagarada Veeraputhra =

- Directed by: R. Nagendra Rao
- Written by: R. N. Jayagopal
- Screenplay by: R. N. Jayagopal
- Produced by: R Nagendra Rao
- Starring: R. N. Sudarshan; B. Saroja Devi; R. Nagendra Rao; Kalyan Kumar
- Cinematography: R. N. K. Prasad
- Edited by: S. M. Shali
- Music by: M. S. Viswanathan; T. K. Ramamoorthy
- Production company: RNR Pictures
- Distributed by: RNR Pictures
- Release date: 13 December 1961
- Country: India
- Language: Kannada

Vijayanagarada Veeraputhra is a 1961 Indian Kannada-language film directed and produced by R. Nagendra Rao. The film features R. N. Sudarshan, B. Saroja Devi, R. Nagendra Rao and Kalyan Kumar in the lead roles. It's musical score was composed by M. S. Viswanathan and T. K. Ramamurthy.

Set against the backdrop of the Vijayanagara Empire during the late 15th century, the film is a fictional narrative that combines elements of medieval action and revenge drama. It includes themes of conspiracy, plotting, melodrama, and romance, presented in a historical setting.

== Cast ==
- R. N. Sudarshan
- B. Saroja Devi
- R. Nagendra Rao
- Kalyan Kumar
- Udaykumar
- Sandhya
- Lakshmidevi
- Ramadevi
- Baby Lakshmi
- Balakrishna
- Narasimharaju
- Ganapathi Bhat
- H. R. Shastry
- Shyamsundar
- Hanumantha Rao
- M. G. Mari Rao
- Udayashankar
- G. M. Nanjappa
- Sando Prakash
- Haneef Kumar
- Shivaji Rao
- Desharaj
- Hanumanthachar
- Guggu
- Shankarnarayan
- Maheshwaraiah
- Gopal Rao
- Shakunthala
- Shashi
- Kala
- Mala
- Leela
- Janardhan

== Soundtrack ==
The music was composed by Viswanathan–Ramamoorthy.

| No. | Song | Singers | Lyrics | Length (m:ss) |
|---|---|---|---|---|
| 1 | "Maathina Malla" | P. Nageswara Rao, L. R. Eswari | R. N. Jayagopal | 04:34 |
| 2 | "Apara Keerthi" | P. B. Srinivas | R. N. Jayagopal | 03:24 |
| 3 | "Madhuraa Mohana Veena Vaadhana" | P. Susheela | R. N. Jayagopal | 03:28 |
