= Naa Mechida Huduga =

- Directed by: R. N. Jayagopal
- Written by: P. S. Vaidyanathan
- Produced by: Harini
- Starring: Srinath; Kalpana; K. S. Ashwath
- Cinematography: T. G. Shekar
- Edited by: N. C. Rajan
- Music by: Vijaya Bhaskar
- Production company: Vijaya Bharati
- Release date: 1972
- Running time: 154 minutes
- Country: India
- Language: Kannada

Naa Mechida Huduga is a 1972 Kannada romantic drama film directed and scripted by R. N. Jayagopal. It is based on the story Divorce In Indian Style written by P. S. Vaidyanathan.

The film starred Srinath, Kalpana, K. S. Ashwath and Leelavathi in lead roles. The music composed by Vijaya Bhaskar was widely appreciated and declared chart-busters. The film was remade in Tamil as Kattila Thottila and in Telugu as Ammayi Pelli

== Cast ==
- Kalpana as Pramila
- K. S. Ashwath as Bhaskar Rao, Pramila's father and an advocate
- Leelavathi as Leelavathi, Pramila's mother and a doctor
- Srinath as N. Gopinath "Gopi" Rao
- R. Nagendra Rao as N. G. Rao, Gopi's father
- Ramesh as Sundar, Bhaskar Rao's subordinate
- Shivaram as Shankar, Leelavathi's subordinate
- Vadiraj as Prasad, Pramila's brother
- Master Arun
- M. N. Lakshmi Devi as Anusuya, Gopi's mother
- R. T. Rama as Padma

== Soundtrack ==
The music was composed by Vijaya Bhaskar with lyrics by R. N. Jayagopal. All the songs composed for the film were received extremely well and considered as evergreen songs.

Track listing
No.	Title	Lyrics	Singer(s)	Length
1.	"Beladingalina Nore Haalu"	R. N. Jayagopal	P. B. Sreenivas, S. Janaki
2.	"Appa Amma Jagaladali"	R. N. Jayagopal	Vadiraj, B. K. Sumitra, L. R. Anjali
3.	"Cheluve Oh Cheluve"	R. N. Jayagopal	P. B. Sreenivas, A. L. Raghavan
4.	"Mangalada Ee Sudina"	R. N. Jayagopal	S. Janaki
5.	"Naa Mechida Huduganige"	R. N. Jayagopal	S. Janaki
