= Sakshatkara =

- Directed by: Puttanna Kanagal
- Written by: Kanagal Prabhakara Shastry
- Screenplay by: Kanagal Prabhakara Shastry
- Produced by: B. Mallik
- Starring: Rajkumar; Jamuna; R. Nagendra Rao; Prithviraj Kapoor
- Cinematography: Srikanth
- Edited by: V. P. Krishna
- Music by: M. Ranga Rao
- Distributed by: Mallik Productions
- Release date: 2 November 1971
- Country: India
- Language: Kannada

Sakshatkara is a 1971 Indian Kannada-language drama film directed by Puttanna Kanagal and starring Dr. Rajkumar, Jamuna, Prithviraj Kapoor and R. Nagendra Rao. This was third and final collaboration of Kanagal and Rajkumar. Sundar Krishna Urs was the associate director on the film. It was dubbed into Hindi as Insaan.

== Plot ==
The story revolves around the dangers of superstition, particularly when it concerns marriage and how unscrupulous elements in society could manipulate these beliefs to their benefit and lead to tragic consequences.

== Cast ==
- Dr. Rajkumar as Mahesh
- Jamuna as Uma
- Prithviraj Kapoor as Bhoopalayya, Mahesh's father
- R. Nagendra Rao as Ajjayya
- T. R. Narasimharaju as Krishna
- T. N. Balakrishna as Laksmanayya, a lawyer, Bhoopalayya's brother-in-law
- Vajramuni as Subhash
- B. Jayamma as Thaayamma
- R. Nagarathnamma as Naagatthe
- M. Jayashree as Maniyamma
- Swarnamma
- Surekha as Rekha, wife of Krishna
- Prabha
- Shanthamma
- Bhadrachalam
- Y. R. Ashwath Narayana
- H. R. Shastry as Ramajja
- Anantharao Maccheri as Shanubhoga Shankarappa
- Siddalingaiah

== Production ==
The filming was held at Aldoor village at Chikmagalur. The film's post-release, the hillock behind Government First Grade College near shandy market in Aldoor is now popularly known as "Sakshathkara Gudda".

== Soundtrack ==
The music for the film was composed by M. Ranga Rao and lyrics was written by Kanagal Prabhakar Shastry.

No.	Title	Singers	Length
1.	"Olave Jeevana Sakshatkara (Sad version)"	P. Susheela, P. B. Sreenivas	5:42
2.	"Kaadiruvalo"	P. Susheela	3:28
3.	"Janma Janmada"	P. B. Sreenivas	3:31
4.	"Phalisithu"	P. Susheela	3:09
5.	"Olave Jeevana Sakshatkara"	P. Susheela	3:31

== Release and Reception ==
The film had a huge opening thanks to the grand success of Puttanna Kanagal-Dr. Rajkumar duo's previous ventures, Mallammana Pavada and Karulina Kare but soon fizzled out. As a compensation for the losses suffered, Rajkumar acted for free of cost in the 1976 movie Premada Kanike.
