= 5th National Film Awards =

Indian ceremony celebrating cinema of 1957

- Awarded for: Best of Indian cinema in 1957
- Awarded by: Ministry of Information and Broadcasting
- Presented by: Rajendra Prasad (President of India)
- Presented on: 16 April 1958
- Site: Vigyan Bhavan, New Delhi
- Official website: dff.nic.in

Highlights
- Best Feature Film: Do Aankhen Barah Haath
- Most awards: • Andhare Alo • Do Aankhen Barah Haath • Mother India (2)

The 5th National Film Awards, formerly the State Awards for Films, were a set of awards presented by the Indian Ministry of Information and Broadcasting to recognize the best Indian films of 1957. The ceremony took place at Vigyan Bhavan, New Delhi, on 16 April 1958. The awards were given by the then-Indian President, Dr. Rajendra Prasad.

It was the first National Film Awards ceremony with monetary prizes in addition to the presentation of medals and certificates.

== Awards ==
Awards were divided into two categories: feature films and non-feature films.

- President's Gold Medal for the All India Best Feature Film (now known as the National Film Award for Best Feature)
- President's Gold Medal for the Best Documentary Film (now known as the National Film Award for Best Non-Feature Film)
- Prime Minister's Gold Medal (now known as the National Film Award for Best Children's Film)
- President's Silver Medal for Best Feature Film (now known as the National Film Award for Best Feature Film in a particular language)
- Certificate of Merit (discontinued)

=== Feature films ===
Feature films were awarded on a national as well as regional level. Two Hindi films, Do Aankhen Barah Haath and Mother India, in addition to the Bengali film Andhare Alo, won the maximum number of awards.

Do Aankhen Barah Haath also won the President's Gold Medal for the All India Best Feature Film.

==== All India Awards ====
The awards for each category follow:

Award	Film	Language	Awardee(s)	Cash prize
President's Gold Medal for the All India Best Feature Film	Do Aankhen Barah Haath	Hindi	Producer: Rajkamal Kalamandir	Gold Medal and ₹20,000
President's Gold Medal for the All India Best Feature Film	Do Aankhen Barah Haath	Hindi	Director: V. Shantaram	₹5,000
All India Certificate of Merit for the Second Best Feature Film	Andhare Alo	Bengali	Producer: Sreemati Pictures	Certificate of Merit and ₹10,000
All India Certificate of Merit for the Second Best Feature Film	Andhare Alo	Bengali	Director: Haridas Bhattacharya	₹2,500
All India Certificate of Merit	Mother India	Hindi	Producer: Mehboob Productions	Certificate of Merit only
All India Certificate of Merit	Mother India	Hindi	Director: Mehboob Khan	Certificate of Merit only
Prime Minister's Gold Medal for the Best Children's Film	Hum Panchhi Ek Daal Ke	Hindi	Producer: AVM Productions	Gold Medal and ₹20,000
Prime Minister's Gold Medal for the Best Children's Film	Hum Panchhi Ek Daal Ke	Hindi	Director: P. L. Santoshi	₹5,000
All India Certificate of Merit for Second Best Children's Film	Janmatithi	Bengali	Producer: R. B. Films	Certificate of Merit and ₹10,000
All India Certificate of Merit for Second Best Children's Film	Janmatithi	Bengali	Director: Dilip Mukherjee	₹2,500

==== Regional Awards ====
Regional Awards were given to the best films made in the regional languages of India. However, the President's Silver Medal for Best Feature Film was not given to Assamese, Tamil and Telugu language films; Certificates of Merit were awarded in those languages.

Award	Film	Awardee(s)	
Award	Film	Producer	Director
Feature Films in Assamese
Certificate of Merit for Second Best Feature Film	Maak Aru Morom	Brajen Barua	Nip Barua
Feature Films in Bengali
President's Silver Medal for Best Feature Film	Andhare Alo	Sreemati Pictures	Haridas Bhattacharya
Certificate of Merit for Second Best Feature Film	Louha-Kapat	L. B. Films International	Tapan Sinha
Certificate of Merit for Third Best Feature Film	Harano Sur	Alochaya Productions	Ajoy Kar
Feature Films in Hindi
President's Silver Medal for Best Feature Film	Do Aankhen Barah Haath	Rajkamal Kalamandir	V. Shantaram
Certificate of Merit for Second Best Feature Film	Mother India	Mehboob Productions	Mehboob Khan
Certificate of Merit for Third Best Feature Film	Musafir	Hrishikesh Mukherjee	Hrishikesh Mukherjee
Feature Films in Kannada
President's Silver Medal for Best Feature Film	Premada Puthri	R. N. R. Pictures	R. Nagendra Rao
Feature Films in Malayalam
President's Silver Medal for Best Feature Film	Padatha Painkili	Neela Productions	P. Subramaniam
Feature Films in Marathi
President's Silver Medal for Best Feature Film	Grihadevata	Surel Chitra, Kolhapur	Madhav Shinde
Feature Films in Tamil
Certificate of Merit for Second Best Feature Film	Mudhalali	M. A. V. Pictures	V. Srinivasan
Feature Films in Telugu
Certificate of Merit for Best Feature Film	Bhagya Rekha	Ponnaluri Brothers	B. N. Reddy
Certificate of Merit for Second Best Feature Film	Thodi Kodallu	Annapoorna Pictures	Adurthi Subba Rao

=== Non-Feature films ===
Non-feature film awards were given for the documentaries produced in the country.

Award	Film	Language	Awardee(s)	Cash prize
President's Gold Medal for the Best Documentary Film	A Himalayan Tapestry	English	Producer: Burmah Shell	Gold Medal and ₹4,000
President's Gold Medal for the Best Documentary Film	A Himalayan Tapestry	English	Director: Mohan Bhavnani	₹1,000
All India Certificate of Merit for the Second Best Documentary	Mandu	English	Producer: Films Division	Certificate of Merit and ₹2,000
All India Certificate of Merit for the Second Best Documentary	Mandu	English	Director: Neil Gokhale	₹500
All India Certificate of Merit	Dharti Ki Jhankar	Hindi	Producer: Films Division; Director: Bhaskar Rao	Certificate of Merit only

=== Awards not given ===
Awards not presented (due to a lack of eligible nominees):

- President's Silver Medal for Best Feature Film in Assamese
- President's Silver Medal for Best Feature Film in Tamil
- President's Silver Medal for Best Feature Film in Telugu
