= Mannina Maga =

- Directed by: Geethapriya
- Written by: Geethapriya
- Screenplay by: Geethapriya
- Produced by: M. V. Venkatachalam; Alexander
- Starring: Rajkumar; Kalpana
- Cinematography: V. Manohar
- Edited by: Bal G. Yadav
- Music by: Vijaya Bhaskar
- Release date: 1968
- Running time: 114 minutes
- Country: India
- Language: Kannada

Mannina Maga ( transl. Son of the soil) is a 1968 Indian Kannada-language drama film directed by Geethapriya marking his debut as a solo in film-direction. The film stars Rajkumar, Kalpana and Jayakumari. Produced by Sudarshan Movies banner and written by Geethapriya, the film received rave reviews and went on to win National Film Award for Best Feature Film in Kannada and ran for more than 100 days in cinema halls.

Bangalore Mirror had reported that the attitude of the heroine of rejecting the city for a village life was rare, an affirmation of the possibility or, the difficulty, of sustaining community life in a city is more common.

== Cast ==
- Rajkumar as Raja
- Kalpana as Mallika
- M. P. Shankar as Byranna
- Jayakumari
- H. R. Shastry
- Dikki Madhava Rao
- Vijayaprasad
- Ashwath Narayana
- B. Jaya
- Shanthamma
- Jayachitra

== Production ==
Geetapriya finalised the script for his first directorial venture Mannina Maga. A house in Sadashivnagar was used for shooting. The film was also shot in a village Bijjawara and had booked accommodation in the Nandi Hills.

== Soundtrack ==
Mannina Maga

Soundtrack album by Vijaya Bhaskar
- Released: 1968
- Genre: Feature film soundtrack
- Length: 16:24
- Language: Kannada
- Label: Saregama

The film's soundtrack tuned by Vijaya Bhaskar found immense popularity with "Bhagavanta Kaikotta" and "Idena Sabhyate" songs reaching the cult status with philosophical lyrics by Geethapriya. The album has five soundtracks.

Track list
No.	Title	Lyrics	Singer(s)	Length
1.	"Idhenu Sabhyathe"	Geethapriya	P. Susheela	3:09
2.	"Mellage Nadeyole"	Geethapriya	P. Susheela	3:28
3.	"Alutghihudhu Maanava"	Geethapriya	P. B. Sreenivas	3:16
4.	"Bhagavantha Kaikotta"	Geethapriya	P. B. Sreenivas	3:10
5.	"Bareyada Kaigalu"	Geethapriya	S. Janaki	3:21
Total length:				16:24

== Release ==
The film ran for more than 100 days in Bangalore's Kapali and Bharath theatres. It was Kapali theatre's opening film.

== Awards ==
- 1968 – National Film Award for Best Feature Film in Kannada
- Karnataka State Film Award for Best Film
- Karnataka State Film Award for Best Screenplay – Geethapriya
