= Jeevanadhi =

Jeevanadi
- Directed by: D. Rajendra Babu
- Written by: Sainath (dialogues)
- Screenplay by: D. Rajendra Babu
- Produced by: P. Dhanraj
- Starring: Vishnuvardhan; Kushboo; Ananth Nag; Urvashi
- Cinematography: Prasad Babu
- Edited by: Shyam
- Music by: Koti; Background score: Sadhu Kokila
- Production company: Sri Dhanalakshmi Creations
- Release date: 10 September 1996
- Running time: 148 minutes
- Country: India
- Language: Kannada

Jeevanadi is a 1996 Indian Kannada-language drama film directed by D. Rajendra Babu and produced by P. Dhanraj. The film stars Vishnuvardhan, Anant Nag and Kushboo. The film was widely popular for its title song composed by Koti upon release. The film was a remake of 1967 Tamil film Pesum Deivam.

== Plot ==
This movie indirectly depicts how River Kaveri originates from one place and is served, loved and accepted by another place.

== Cast ==
- Vishnuvardhan as Sagar
- Anant Nag as Dr. Harshavardhan
- Kushboo as Kaveri
- Urvashi as Dr. Priyadarshini
- Tara
- Umashree as Santhanamma
- Srinivasa Murthy as Subhramanya
- R. N. Jayagopal
- Doddanna as Ravi Shankar Shastri
- Shivaram as Dr. Shivaram
- Bank Janardhan
- Kishori Ballal as Annapurna

== Soundtrack ==
Jeevanadhi
- Soundtrack cover

Soundtrack album by Koti
- Genre: Feature film soundtrack
- Length: 40:14
- Label: Jhankar Music

The music of the film was composed by Koti and lyrics written by R. N. Jayagopal. The album consists of eight soundtracks. The song "Kannada Naadina Jeevanadhi" was received extremely well and became very popular. Another track "Yello Yaaro Hego" from the film was Sonu Nigam's first song in Kannada as a playback singer.

Track listing
No.	Title	Singer(s)	Length
1.	"Daivada Karuneyo"	S. P. Balasubrahmanyam, Manjula Gururaj	5:22
2.	"Ee Andada Chendada"	Rajesh Krishnan	4:19
3.	"Ee Andada"	S. P. Balasubrahmanyam	4:19
4.	"Kannada Nadina Jeevanadi"	S. P. Balasubrahmanyam	5:50
5.	"Kannada Nadina Jeevanadi - Duet"	S. P. Balasubrahmanyam, Anuradha Paudwal	5:49
6.	"Navamasa Ninnanu Horalilla"	Anuradha Paudwal, Rajesh Krishnan	4:55
7.	"Sheshadrivasa Sri Tirumale sha"	Rajesh Krishnan, Manjula Gururaj	4:45
8.	"Eello Yaaro Hego"	Sonu Nigam	4:55
Total length:			40:14
