= Lakshmi Saraswathi =

- Directed by: K. S. L. Swamy (Ravi)
- Written by: GVG
- Screenplay by: Valampuri Somanathan
- Produced by: B. H. Jayanna
- Starring: B. Saroja Devi; Ramesh; Sudarshan; R. Nagendra Rao
- Cinematography: C. J. Mohan
- Edited by: Bal G. Yadav
- Music by: Vijaya Bhaskar
- Production company: SJK Productions
- Distributed by: SJK Productions
- Release date: 14 July 1970
- Country: India
- Language: Kannada

Lakshmi Saraswathi is a 1970 Indian Kannada-language film, directed by K. S. L. Swamy (Ravi) and produced by B. H. Jayanna. The film stars B. Saroja Devi, Ramesh, Sudarshan and R. Nagendra Rao in the lead roles. The film has musical score by Vijaya Bhaskar.

== Cast ==
- B. Sarojadevi as Lakshmi / Saraswathi
- Ramesh as Venu, Lakshmi's husband
- R. N. Sudarshan as Anand, a doctor
- R. Nagendra Rao as Lakshmi and Saraswati's father
- Ramadevi as Gundamma
- Narasimharaju as Garageshwari Ranganathachar
- M. N. Lakshmi Devi as Shanthamma, Ranganathachar's wife
- Y. R. Ashwath Narayan
- Baby Mala
- Thoogudeepa Srinivas
- H. R. Krishna Shastry
- Manohar
- C. L. Narayana Rao
- Kodandu
- Ragini in a cameo
- B. V. Radha in a cameo
- M. Jayashree in a cameo
- Annapurnamma in a cameo
- Lokanath in a cameo
- Kumari Shantha
- Kumari Saroja
