= Jatakam =

1953 film by R. Nagendra Rao

- Theatrical release poster in Tamil
- Directed by: R. Nagendra Rao
- Screenplay by: T. M. V. Pathi
- Produced by: R. Nagendra Rao
- Starring: T. K. Balachandran; Suryakala
- Cinematography: Yoosuf Mulji
- Edited by: S. Surya
- Music by: R. Govardhanam
- Production company: R. N. R. Pictures
- Distributed by: AVM
- Release date: 25 December 1953
- Running time: 142 minutes
- Country: India
- Languages: Tamil; Kannada; Telugu

Jatakam (/dʒɑːðəɡəm/ transl. Horoscope; also spelt Jathakam) is a 1953 Indian Tamil-language comedy film directed by R. Nagendra Rao. The film stars T. K. Balachandran and Suryakala. It was simultaneously made in Kannada as Jataka Phala and in Telugu as Jatakaphalam. The film was released on 25 December 1953.

== Cast ==
List adapted from the film's song book

Male cast

- K. Sarangapani as Kandasami Kalingarayar
- R. Nagendra Rao as Chinnisami Thanjarayar
- T. K. Balachandran as Kanakasabai
- P. D. Sambandam as Somu
- Vikatan Krishnamoorthi as Dharmalingam
- N. S. Narayana Pillai as Doctor
- Ganapathi Bhat as Velu

Supporting cast

S. G. Subbaiah, Kalyanam, C. V. Ramachandran

Female cast

- K. R. Chellam as Kannammal
- K. N. Kamalam as Vetummal
- Kamala Bai as Ponnammal
- K. Suryakala as Lakshmi
- Kumari Lakshmi as Saraswathi
- K. S. Angamuthu as Meena

Dance

- Kumari Kamala

== Production ==
The film was simultaneously made in Kannada as Jataka Phala and in Telugu as Jatakaphalam. The film was produced and directed by R. Nagendra Rao. Screenplay and dialogues were written by T. M. V. Pathi. Yoosuf Mulji was in charge of cinematography while the editing was done by S. Surya. Art direction was by A. Balu. Vazhuvoor B. Ramaiyah Pillai and Jaishankar handled the choreography. The film was processed at AVM laboratory.

== Soundtrack ==
Music was composed by R. Govardhanam while the lyrics were penned by T. K. Sundara Vathiyar. P. B. Sreenivas was introduced to Tamil films with the song Sindhanai En Selvame.

Song	Singer/s	Duration (m:ss)
"Eliyor Seiyum Izhivaana Thozhilai"	M. S. Rajeswari & P. Susheela	
"Maadugal Maeithidum Paiyan"	M. S. Rajeswari	03:05
"Manadhil Pudhuvidha Inbam Kaanudhe"	M. S. Rajeswari	02:52
"Kulavum Yaazhisaiye"	M. S. Rajeswari	03:05
"Sindhanai En Selvame"	P. B. Sreenivas	03:21
"Mooda Nambikkaiyaale Pala Kaedu Vilaiyum"	P. B. Sreenivas	02:53
"Velan Varuvaanodi"	M. L. Vasanthakumari	04:58
"Aandavan Namakku Alikkira'"	G. K. Venkatesh & A. G. Rathnamala	02:56
