= Premada Putri =

- Poster
- Directed by: R. Nagendra Rao
- Produced by: R. Nagendra Rao
- Starring: Kalyan Kumar; Sriranjani Jr.; Udaykumar
- Cinematography: R. N. K. Prasad
- Music by: T. G. Lingappa; H. R. Padmanabha Shastry
- Production company: R. N. R. Pictures
- Release date: 1957
- Running time: 142 mins
- Country: India
- Language: Kannada

Premada Putri is a 1957 Indian Kannada-language film, directed, and produced by and starring R. Nagendra Rao. The film also features Kalyan Kumar, Sriranjani Jr., and Udaykumar. R. N. K. Prasad made his debut in this film. Premada Putri won the National Film Award for Best Feature Film in Kannada at the 5th National Film Awards. The film's musical score and soundtrack were composed by H. R. Padmanabha Shastry and T. G. Lingappa, with lyrics written by R. N. Jayagopal and Prabhakar Shastry. The film was simultaneously shot in Tamil as Anbe Deivam with a slightly different cast.

== Plot ==
Film director Mohan Rao and his wife Sushilamma are a happy couple. Sushilamma has a close friend, Parvathi, whose gentle behaviour and innocence have earned her affection. Parvathi's husband, Shankarappa, is a vagabond and a thief, driven by his obsession with money. Sarasa is their only daughter.

One night, jewels are stolen from Mohan Rao's house, and the police arrest Shankarappa while he is attempting to pawn the jewels at Marwari's shop. Unaware of her husband's criminal activities, Parvathi seeks help from Sushilamma. There she learns that her husband is responsible for the theft from the very people who have been kind to her. Parvathi begs Mohan Rao to save her husband from imprisonment. Moved by pity, Mohan Rao informs the police that the complaint was false and that his wife had unknowingly given the jewels to them. However, Shankarappa continues his criminal ways.

In the end, Shankarappa and Parvathi are arrested for murder and dacoity and are convicted. Upon hearing this, Sushilamma attempts to reach Parvathi but is unsuccessful. She then learns that Sarasa has been placed in an orphanage. Sushilamma goes there, brings Sarasa home, and the couple decides to adopt her. Sushilamma informs Parvathi of this development through a letter, bringing her relief and joy.

== Cast ==
- Kalyan Kumar
- Sriranjani Jr.
- Udaykumar
- N. R. Sandhya
- Suryakala
- R. Nagendra Rao
- Gummadi

== Soundtrack ==
Title	Singers	Lyrics
"Thribhuvana Janani"	P. Leela	R. N. Jayagopal
"Premave Daiva"	R. N. Panigrahi	R. N. Jayagopal
"Kanuve Manamohana"	P. Leela	R. N. Jayagopal
"Baaramma Nidiraadevi"	P. Leela	R. N. Jayagopal
"Aadi Paadi Odanaadi"	Ghantasala, P. Leela	K. Prabhakara Shastry

== Awards ==
- 1957 - National Film Award for Best Feature Film in Kannada
