= Bangarada Hoovu =

- Directed by: B. A. Arasu Kumar
- Screenplay by: B. A. Arasu Kumar
- Produced by: B. A. Arasu Kumar
- Starring: Rajkumar; Kalpana; Udaykumar; Shylashri, V N Narayan
- Cinematography: B. N. Haridas
- Edited by: U. Umakanth; Mani; Shekar
- Music by: Rajan–Nagendra
- Production company: Sri Srinivasa Chitralaya
- Release date: 1967
- Running time: 141 minutes
- Country: India
- Language: Kannada

Bangarada Hoovu ( transl. Golden Flower) is a 1967 Indian Kannada language film directed, written and produced by B. A. Arasu Kumar. The film stars Rajkumar, V N Narayan,Kalpana, Udaykumar and Shylashri. Upon its release, the film received widespread praise, winning the National Film Award for Best Feature Film in Kannada. The film is an adaptation of the play Abhaagini written by the director himself. Bangarada Hoovu addresses the misconceptions surrounding leprosy - particularly the superstition that leprosy is a punishment for past sins.

== Plot ==
Anand and Latha grow up together, and Latha falls in love with Anand. After completing his education, Anand moves to Rampura to work as a Block Development Officer, where he falls in love with his friend's sister, Seetha. However, Seetha abruptly refuses his proposal, revealing that she is suffering from leprosy. Heartbroken, Anand returns to his village.

His mother encourages him to marry Latha, telling him that leprosy is an incurable disease. Meanwhile, Seetha is cured of her condition. When she returns, she discovers that Anand is about to marry Latha. In a desperate moment, Seetha attempts suicide, but Anand and her relatives intervene. Anand rushes to Seetha's side, and they are ultimately reunited.

== Cast ==
- Rajkumar as Anand
- Kalpana as Seetha
- Udaykumar as Ravi
- Shylashri as Latha
- Balakrishna as Padmanabha Panditha
- Narasimharaju
- Pandari Bai as Anand's Mother
- V N Narayan (Kannada Actor) as Doctor
- Rajeshwari

== Soundtrack ==
The music was composed by Rajan–Nagendra, with lyrics by Chi. Udaya Shankar and Vijaya Narasimha.

Track listing
No.	Title	Singer(s)	Length
1.	"Do Do Do Basavanna"	P. B. Sreenivas, L. R. Eswari
2.	"Aa Mogavu Entha Cheluvu"	P. B. Sreenivas
3.	"Oduva Nadi Sagarava"	P. Susheela, P. B. Sreenivas
4.	"Maduve Maduve"	S. Janaki
5.	"Odhi Odhi"	S. Janaki
6.	"Nee Nadeva Haadiyalli"	P. Susheela, S. Janaki

== Awards ==
- National Film Award for Best Feature Film in Kannada
- Karnataka State Film Award for Best Film
- Karnataka State Film Award for Best Actor - Rajkumar
