= Mareyada Deepavali =

- Directed by: R. Sampath
- Screenplay by: R. Sampath
- Story by: Sivasankari
- Produced by: M. Jagannath Rao
- Starring: Rajesh; Kalpana; R. N. Sudarshan
- Cinematography: R. Sampath
- Edited by: B. Gopala Rao
- Music by: Vijaya Bhaskar
- Production company: S V S Movies
- Release date: 1972
- Running time: 138 minutes
- Country: India
- Language: Kannada

Mareyada Deepavali is a 1972 Kannada-language romantic drama film directed by R. Sampath and produced by M. Jagannath Rao. The film starred Rajesh, Kalpana and R. N. Sudarshan in lead roles. It was adapted from the Tamil novel Thriveni Sangamam by Sivasankari.

== Cast ==
- Rajesh
- Kalpana
- R. N. Sudarshan
- Sampath
- K. S. Ashwath
- Srilalitha
- Baby Rani
- Ramachandra Shastry

== Soundtrack ==
The music was composed by Vijaya Bhaskar with lyrics by R. N. Jayagopal.

Track listing
No.	Title	Singer(s)	Length
1.	"Jeevanave Sukha Payana"	P. B. Sreenivas, S. Janaki	03:13
2.	"Chirayuvagu Kanda"	S. Janaki	03:31
3.	"Amma Muddu Amma"	S. Janaki, B. K. Sumithra	03:27
