= Navika (film) =

- Directed by: Sen Prakash
- Written by: Yogi (dialogues)
- Screenplay by: Sen Prakash
- Story by: Rangaswamy Belugali
- Produced by: Manish Chandra
- Starring: Manish Chandra; Shravanth Rao; Swathi; Esther Jannat
- Cinematography: Cinetech Soori
- Edited by: R D Ravi
- Music by: Raj Narayan Dash (Kannada Film Mani Music Director Raja)
- Production company: Binocular Productions
- Release date: 31 August 2012
- Country: India
- Language: Kannada

Navika is a 2012 Indian Kannada-language action crime film directed by Sen Prakash starring Manish Chandra, Shravanth Rao, Swathi and Esther Jennet. The film is inspired by Deewaar (1975).

== Cast ==
- Manish Chandra as Soori
- Shravanth Rao as Shankar
- Swathi as Sandhya
- Esther Jannat as Shwetha
- Shobaraj as Avinash Hegde
- Tennis Krishna
- Ninasam Ashwath
- R. N. Sudarshan

== Soundtrack ==
All lyrics are written by Raghavendra Kamath; all music is composed by Raj Narayan Dash.

Track listing
No.	Title	Singer(s)	Length
1.	"Buildup Beda Baare"	Hemanth, Jogi, Sunitha
2.	"Kaalada Chakra"	Hemanth, Rajnarayan Dash
3.	"Thelihode Naanu Patho"	Badri Prasad, Chaitra H. G.
4.	"Usiraguve"	Badri Prasad

== Reception ==
A critic from The Times of India wrote that " It’s good to see new directors with fresh ideas like Sen Prakash enter Sandalwood". A critic from Indo-Asian News Service wrote that "Good TV anchors don't necessarily make good actors on celluloid. Well, the point has been well proven in the new film Naavika".
