= Madras to Pondicherry =

- Theatrical release poster
- Directed by: Thirumalai–Mahalingam
- Written by: Usilai Somanathan
- Produced by: T. S. Adhinarayanan; P. M. Nachchimuthu; S. Sivaraman; G. K. Selvaraj
- Starring: Ravichandran; Kalpana
- Cinematography: G. Vittal Rao
- Edited by: A. Paul Duraisingam
- Music by: T. K. Ramamoorthy
- Production company: Sri Venkateswara Cinetone
- Release date: 16 December 1966
- Running time: 121 minutes
- Country: India
- Language: Tamil

Madras to Pondicherry is a 1966 Indian Tamil-language road comedy thriller film, directed by Thirumalai–Mahalingam and written by Usilai Somanathan. The film stars Ravichandran and Kalpana. It was released on 16 December 1966, became a commercial success, and was remade in Hindi as Bombay to Goa (1972).

== Plot ==
Mala, an aspiring film actress, leaves home because of her interest in this which is kindled by a group of thugs. One of them shoots a member of his gang, which she witnesses. To escape them, she jumps onto a running bus going from Madras to Pondicherry. The thugs hire an assassin to board the bus Mala is in to kill her. However, a man named Baskar also gets into the bus. Realising that Mala is in danger, he voluntarily saves her and ends up falling in love with her. Ultimately, it is revealed that Baskar is Mala's prospective bridegroom whom she tried to avoid by leaving her home.

== Cast ==
- B. S. Ravichandran as Ravi
- Nagesh as Gajakarnam, the bus conductor
- Karunanidhi as Naidu, the bus driver
- Kalpana as Mala
- Manorama as a Brahmin woman
- V. K. Ramasamy as street magician
- O. A. K. Thevar as Hotel owner
- A. Veerappan as a Brahmin man
- Kallapart Natarajan as Mala's love interest
- V. S. Raghavan as Thanikasalam, Mala's father
- Karikol Raju as Bhagavathar
- Veerasamy as Ravi's father
- P. K. Saraswathi as Meenakshi, Mala's mother
- C. T. Rajakantham
- K. S. Angamuthu as Poongodi, Bus passenger
- Gundu Karuppaiah as Bus passenger
- K. K. Soundar as Mad mother's son
- Kadhar as Gopu, the Brahmin couple's son
- Thayir Vadai Desikan as Bus passenger

== Production ==
Madras to Pondicherry was directed by the duo Thirumalai–Mahalingam, written by Usilai Somanathan, and produced under the banner Sri Venkateswara Cinetone by four people: T. S. Adhinarayanan, P. M. Nachimuthu, S. Sivaraman and G. K. Selvaraj. It was among the earliest road films in Tamil cinema. Suruli Rajan and Bava Lakshmanan shot for a scene at the Meenakshi Amman Temple.

== Soundtrack ==
The music was composed by T. K. Ramamoorthy.

Song	Singer	Lyrics	Length
"Enna Enthan"	T. M. Soundararajan P. Susheela	Namakkal Varadarajan	4:05
"Engey Payanam"	T. M. Soundararajan P. Susheela	Alangudi Somu	4:07
"Malar Ponndra Paruvame"	T. M. Soundararajan	Panchu Arunachalam	3:18
"Hello My Friend Nenjathil Enna"	P. Susheela	Thanjai Vaanan	3:26

== Release and reception ==
Madras to Pondicherry was released on 16 December 1966. Kalki appreciated Nagesh and Karunanidhi's performances, but felt the saloon comedy sequence was unnecessary, and criticised the film's story. Despite this, it became a commercial success.
