= Pathiye Daiva =

- Directed by: R. Nagendra Rao
- Produced by: R. Nagendra Rao
- Starring: R. N. Sudarshan; Kalpana; R. Nagendra Rao; Jayanthi
- Cinematography: R. N. Krishna Prasad
- Music by: Vijaya Bhaskar
- Release date: 1964
- Country: India
- Language: Kannada

Pathiye Daiva ( transl. Husband is god) is a 1964 Indian Kannada film, directed and produced by R. Nagendra Rao. The film stars R. N. Sudarshan, Kalpana, R. Nagendra Rao and Jayanthi in the lead roles. The film's musical score is by Vijaya Bhaskar.

== Cast ==
- R. N. Sudarshan
- Kalpana
- Jayanthi
- R. Nagendra Rao
- Pandari Bai
