= Manasa Veene =

- Directed by: Geethapriya
- Written by: B. N. Haridas
- Screenplay by: Geethapriya
- Produced by: P. Ramamurthy
- Starring: Srinath; Saritha; Sridhar
- Cinematography: B. N. Haridas
- Edited by: Umashankar Babu
- Music by: M. Ranga Rao
- Release date: 1987
- Running time: 135 mins
- Country: India
- Language: Kannada

Manasa Veene is a 1987 Indian Kannada language drama film directed by Geethapriya. The film stars Srinath, Sridhar and Saritha in the lead roles. Produced by P. Ramamurthy and written by B. N. Haridas, the film was released in 1987 and was a musical hit with the critics praising the work of music composer M. Ranga Rao.

== Cast ==
- Srinath
- Sridhar
- Saritha
- Lokanath
- N. S. Rao
- Thyagaraj Urs
- Kaminidharan
- Bellary Renuka
- Sadashiva Brahmavar

== Soundtrack ==
Manasa Veene

Soundtrack album by M. Ranga Rao
- Released: 1987
- Genre: Feature film soundtrack

Track #	Song	Singer(s)	Lyrics
1	"Veene Nanna Manasa Veene"	Vani Jairam, K. J. Yesudas	Geethapriya
2	"Tha Huttida Kanninalli"	Vani Jairam	P. Ramamurthy
3	"Ee Geluve"	Rajkumar Bharathi, Bangalore Latha, S. N. Surendar	Geethapriya
4	"Naa Naguthiruve"	K. J. Yesudas	Geethapriya
