= Kattila Thottila =

- VCD cover
- Directed by: Malliyam Rajagopal
- Screenplay by: Malliyam Rajagopal
- Story by: P. S. Vaithyanathan
- Produced by: Rama Arangannal
- Starring: Gemini Ganesan; P. Bhanumathi
- Cinematography: N. Balakrishnan
- Edited by: N. R. Kittu
- Music by: V. Kumar
- Production company: Arul Films
- Release date: 28 September 1973
- Running time: 153 minutes
- Country: India
- Language: Tamil

Kattila Thottila (transl. Cot or Cradle?) is a 1973 Indian Tamil-language film directed by Malliyam Rajagopal and produced by Rama Arangannal. It is a remake of the 1972 Kannada film Naa Mechida Huduga, which was based on the story Divorce In Indian Style, written by P. S. Vaidyanathan. The film stars Gemini Ganesan and P. Bhanumathi, with Kalpana, Sivakumar, Srikanth, Thengai Srinivasan and Manorama. It was released on 28 September 1973.

== Cast ==
- Gemini Ganesan as Sundaram
- P. Bhanumathi as Meenakshi
- Sivakumar as Sambhasivam
- Kalpana as Padmini
- Srikanth as Raja
- Thengai Srinivasan as Vasu
- Rajesh
- Manorama as Manoramai
- V. S. Raghavan as Sadhasivam
- Master Sekhar as Gopi
- Master Ramu as Ramu
- Gandhimathi as Sadhasivam's wife

== Production ==
The film was in production as early as February 1973. The song "Oru Vidha Mayakkam" was shot at Vijaya Gardens.

== Soundtrack ==
The music was composed by V. Kumar and lyrics were written by Vaali.

| Song | Singer | Length |
|---|---|---|
| "Oru Vidha Mayakkam" | P. Susheela | 4:19 |
| "Amma Appa Sandaiyile" (Amma Pasi) | Saibaba, M. R. Vijaya, Jayaraman | 5:22 |
| "Ambikapathy Pola Naan" | Rajesh, Jayaraman | 3:53 |
| "Naan Nallavar" | P.Susheela | 3:29 |
| "Yaenda Dai" | Sirkazhi Govindarajan | 3:14 |
