= Nadina Bhagya =

- Directed by: R. Nagendra Rao
- Written by: M. V. Gowda
- Screenplay by: R. Nagendra Rao
- Produced by: S Narayanappa; N. Narasimharaju
- Starring: Rajkumar in an extended cameo appearance R. Nagendra Rao; R. N. Sudarshan; T. R. Narasimharaju
- Cinematography: Chittibabu
- Edited by: E. Arunachalam
- Music by: R. Rathnam
- Production company: Narayan Chithra
- Distributed by: Narayan Chithra
- Release date: 1 April 1970
- Running time: 141 min
- Country: India
- Language: Kannada

Nadina Bhagya is a 1970 Indian Kannada-language film, directed by R. Nagendra Rao and produced by S. Narayanappa and N. Narasimharaju. The film stars R. Nagendra Rao, R. N. Sudarshan and T. R. Narasimharaju with Rajkumar in an extended cameo of 25 minutes in the last half an hour of the movie in the role of a crime investigator. The film has musical score by R. Rathnam.

== Cast ==
- Dr. Rajkumar as Balu (extended cameo)
- R. Nagendra Rao as Dharmaiah
- R. N. Sudarshan as Anand
- Narasimharaju as Boregowda
- K. R. Seetharama Sastry
- B. M. Venkatesh
- Srilalitha
- Surekha
- Chandra
- Shanthamma
- Bharadwaj
- Kosu Samputani
- M. V. Gowda
- Vasudev
- Ramakumar
- Ramanna
- Sathyaprakash
- Devadas
- B. R. Jayaram
- G. M. Nanjappa
- Susheelamma
- Pushpavathi
- Vijaykumar
