= Maduve Maduve Maduve =

- Directed by: Geethapriya
- Produced by: Boraiah; Sharadamma Vasanna
- Starring: Udaykumar; Jayanthi; B. M. Venkatesh; Poornima; Ranga
- Cinematography: T. Ellappan
- Music by: Satyam
- Release date: 1969
- Country: India
- Language: Kannada

Maduve Maduve Maduve is a 1969 Indian Kannada-language film, directed by Geethapriya and produced by Boraiah and Sharadamma Vasanna. The film stars Udaykumar, Jayanthi, B. M. Venkatesh and Poornima, with Ranga and Sadhana in supporting roles. The musical score was composed by Satyam.

== Cast ==
- Udaykumar
- Jayanthi
- B. M. Venkatesh
- Ranga
- Poornima
- T. N. Balakrishna
- Sadhana

== Soundtrack ==
The music was composed by Satyam.

No.	Song	Singers	Lyrics	Length (m:ss)
1	"Alli Poorna Chandrama"	P. B. Sreenivas	Geetha Priya	03:33
2	"Jodi Jade Jamuna"	S. P. Balasubrahmanyam, Sumithra	Geetha Priya	03:24
3	"Kannina Notavu"	L. R. Eswari	Geetha Priya	03:14
