= Karulina Kare =

1970 film by Puttanna Kanagal

- VCD cover
- Directed by: Puttanna Kanagal
- Written by: Puttanna Kanagal
- Produced by: Srikanth Nahata
- Starring: Rajkumar; Kalpana; R. Nagendra Rao
- Cinematography: Srikanth; Kumar
- Edited by: S. P. N. Krishna; Velayudham
- Music by: M. Ranga Rao
- Production company: Srikanth Enterprises
- Release date: 1970
- Running time: 155 minutes
- Country: India
- Language: Kannada

Karulina Kare is a 1970 Kannada-language romantic drama film directed and written by Puttanna Kanagal. The film stars Rajkumar, Kalpana and R. Nagendra Rao. The film was remade in Telugu in 1972–73 as Pedda Koduku starring Sobhan Babu.

The film went on to win the Best Editing and Best Sound recording awards in the Karnataka State Awards for the year 1970–71.

== Cast ==
- Rajkumar as Parameshi
- Kalpana as Parvati
- R. Nagendra Rao as Subbanna, Parameshi's foster father
- R. N. Sudarshan as Mohan
- Dinesh as Raja / Soorappa
- Renuka as Uma
- Advani Lakshmi Devi as Gowri
- H. R. Shastry
- Sathyavathi as Shanti
- Rathnakar
- M. S. Subbanna
- Bangalore Nagesh
- Mala (credited as Baby Mala)
- Ravikanth (credited as Master Ravikanth) as young Parameshi

== Soundtrack ==
The music was composed by M. Ranga Rao with lyrics by R. N. Jayagopal. All the songs composed for the film were received extremely well and considered as evergreen songs.

Track listing
No.	Title	Lyrics	Singer(s)	Length
1.	"Mysooru Dasara"	R. N. Jayagopal	P. B. Sreenivas
2.	"A Aa E Ee Kannadada"	R. N. Jayagopal	S. Janaki, B. K. Sumitra, R. N. Jayagopal
3.	"Kande Naa Kande"	R. N. Jayagopal	P. B. Sreenivas
4.	"Thaja Thaja Kalle Kayi"	R. N. Jayagopal	S. Janaki
5.	"Hodeyuva Kai Ondu"	R. N. Jayagopal	P. B. Sreenivas
6.	"Nannavarige Yaaru Saati"	R. N. Jayagopal	S. Janaki, L. R. Eswari
7.	"Asathoma Sadgamaya"	R. N. Jayagopal	P. B. Sreenivas

== Awards ==
=== Karnataka State Film Awards ===
- Best Editor - S. P. N. Krishna
- Best Sound Recording - P. J. Lakshman
