= Kesarina Kamala =

- Directed by: R. N. Jayagopal
- Written by: R. N. Jayagopal (dialogues)
- Screenplay by: R. N. Jayagopal
- Story by: T. N. Narasimhan
- Produced by: T. N. Narasimhan
- Starring: Kalpana; Shringar Nagaraj; Uma Shivakumar; Sharapanjara Iyengar
- Cinematography: R. N. K. Prasad
- Edited by: N. C. Rajan
- Music by: Vijaya Bhaskar
- Production companies: Premier Studios, Mysore
- Release date: 10 October 1973
- Running time: 144 min
- Country: India
- Language: Kannada

Kesarina Kamala ( transl. Lotus of Mud) is a 1973 Indian Kannada drama movie, directed by R. N. Jayagopal and produced by T. N. Narasimhan. The film stars Kalpana, Shringar Nagaraj and Uma Shivakumar in the lead roles. The film has musical score by Vijaya Bhaskar, who introduced Vani Jairam to Kannada Film Industry through this movie.

== Cast ==
- Kalpana as Kamala
- Shringar Nagaraj
- Uma Shivakumar
- Sharapanjara Iyengar
- Surekha
- M. Jayashree as Parvati, Kamala's mother
- Sampath as Nanjundaiah, Kamala's father
- Shakti Prasad in a cameo
- Jayakumar
- Dore
- Master Raviprashant
- B. Kamalamma
- Sudha
- Suseela
- Arundhati
- Kusuma
- Indrani
- Rathnamma
- Chitra Ramesh
- Lakshmi
- Rajeshwari
- Komala
- Prema
- B. Hanumathachar
- Siddhalingappa
- H. Krishna Sastry
- Vijayasarathi
- Padmanabhan
- P. S. Mani

== Soundtrack ==
The Soundtrack of the film was composed by Vijaya Bhaskar, with lyrics penned by R. N. Jayagopal

Track list

#	Title	Singer(s)	Lyricist
1	"Abbabba Elliddalo Kaane"	Vani Jairam, L. R. Anjali	R. N. Jayagopal
2	"Nagu Nee Nagu"	Vani Jairam	R. N. Jayagopal
3	"Manjina Hani Thampu"	S. Janaki	R. N. Jayagopal
4	"Hele Gelathi Priya Madhava Baarene Endu"	S. Janaki	R. N. Jayagopal
