= Nanna Kartavya =

Nanna Karthavya
- Directed by: Vedantam Raghavayya
- Screenplay by: Janaki Sutha
- Produced by: K. S. Sathyanarayan; R. Sundaram
- Starring: Jayalalitha; Kalyan Kumar; R. Nagendra Rao; Sandhya
- Cinematography: R. N. K. Prasad
- Edited by: N. S. Prakasham; K. Balu
- Music by: G. K. Venkatesh
- Production company: Movie Makers
- Release date: 1965
- Country: India
- Language: Kannada

Nanna Karthavya ( transl. My duty) is a 1965 Indian Kannada-language film directed by Vedantam Raghavayya and produced by K. S. Sathyanarayan and R. Sundaram. The film stars J. Jayalalithaa, Kalyan Kumar, R. Nagendra Rao and Sandhya. The film has musical score by G. K. Venkatesh. The plot revolves around a widow (played by Jayalalithaa), who decides to stay with her in-laws, but in unable to regain her life after her husband's death.

== Cast ==
- J. Jayalalithaa as Shantha
- Kalyan Kumar as Sundar
- R. Nagendra Rao as Rao
- Sandhya as Gowri
- Ganapathi Bhat as Shyam Rao
- Krishna Shastry
- R. T. Rama as Basavi
- Nagesh
- Chi. Udaya Shankar
- J. P. Chandrababu as Babu (cameo)
- Narasimharaju as Narasimha (cameo)

== Soundtrack ==
Nanna Kartavya

Soundtrack album by G. K. Venkatesh
- Released: 1965
- Genre: Feature film soundtrack
- Length: 6:56
- Label: Saregama

Music for the film was composed by G. K. Venkatesh. R. N. Jayagopal and Nanju Kavi wrote lyrics for the film's soundtracks. The soundtrack album consists of two tracks.

Track listing
No.	Title	Lyrics	Singer(s)	Length
1.	"Hadinarara Hareyada"	R. N. Jayagopal	P. B. Sreenivas	3:32
2.	"Nannalli Neenagi"	Nanju Kavi	P. B. Sreenivas, S. Janaki	3:24
Total length:				6:56
