= Kalpana (Kannada actress) =

Indian actress

- Born: Lata; 18 July 1943; South Canara, Madras Presidency, British India
- Died: 12 May 1979 (aged 35); Sankeshwar, Karnataka, India
- Occupation: Actress
- Spouse(s): B. N. Viswanath; Gudigeri Basavaraj

Kalpana (18 July 1943 – 12 May 1979), born Lata, was an Indian actress who appeared in Kannada films. She was affectionately referred to as Minugu Taare ("A Shining Star") among the film fraternity. She was widely recognised as one of the greatest actresses of Kannada cinema who enjoyed both fans following and critical acclaim. She made her screen debut as a lead actress in the 1963 release Saaku Magalu directed by veteran B. R. Panthulu. During a career that spanned from the early 1960s to the late 1970s, Kalpana appeared in numerous commercially successful as well as critically appreciated films, many of which featured her alongside actor Rajkumar. She worked in a few Tamil, Tulu and Malayalam films as well. Many of her successful films were female-centric, giving ample scope for her performance.

One of her best-known roles was that of Kaveri in the multiple-award-winning film Sharapanjara released in 1971, a performance that won her the Karnataka State Film Award for Best Actress for that year. Her portrayal of a highly spirited and complex woman who fights her mental trauma won her the largest fan following ever for a Kannada actress. Her association with the veteran film maker Puttanna Kanagal both professionally and personally became the talk of the town back in the 1970s. They both went on to work in many commercially and critically successful films until they grew apart. In her career Kalpana received the Filmfare Award for Best Actress – Kannada once and the Karnataka State Film Award for Best Actress thrice.

== Early life ==
Lata was born on 18 July 1943 to Krishnamurthy and Janakamma, in the South Canara region of the erstwhile Madras Presidency of British India (in present-day Dakshina Kannada, Karnataka, India). She was affectionately called Kalpana by the family. She had one sibling, brother Diwakar. Kalpana was drawn towards stage acting as a child after she spent much of her younger days with aunt Seethamma, an actress. She also trained in Indian classical dance during this time, winning an award at the State-level in a competition. Kalpana was drawn towards film acting after she was inspired by B. Saroja Devi's performance in the 1961 Kannada-language film Kittur Chennamma.

In the early 1960s, Kalpana left for Uttara Kannada with her mother and brother to study the basics of film and stage performances. She subsequently moved to Davangere, where upon meeting a relative, Shivakumar, she was introduced to playwright and filmmaker B. R. Panthulu, through actor Narasimharaju. Panthulu cast her in his 1963 Kannada film Saaku Magalu.

== Career ==
Kalpana in Sharapanjara (1971)

In the romantic drama Saaku Magalu (1963), Kalpana played Uma, the foster sister of Raghuram, played by Dr. Rajkumar. She appeared in antagonistic characters in Kavaleradu Kulavandu (1965) and Bala Nagamma (1966). In Naandi (1964), she played the first wife of Rajkumar's character. The two would go on to become a frequent collaborators starring together in a total 19 Kannada films. Panthulu then made Chinnada Gombe (1964) with her. With opportunities in Kannada films drying up in the mid-1960s, Kalpana went on to appear in a handful of Tamil and Malayalam-language films.

However, it was the 1967 released Belli Moda, directed by Puttanna Kanagal that brought her to the forefront. This portrayal of hers was instantly accepted and she soon was catapulted to the top among the actresses of the 1960s. She dominated the Kannada film industry during the late 1960s and 1970s and was critically acclaimed for some of her author-backed roles in films like Sharapanjara, Gejje Pooje, Belli Moda, Eradu Kanasu, Kappu Bilupu, Bayalu Daari, Gandhada Gudi and Bangarada Hoovu. She worked with almost all the leading actors and directors of her time. Her most frequent co-stars were Rajkumar, Gangadhar and Udaykumar. P. Susheela and S. Janaki were the regular voices behind her songs in the films. She gave stiff competition to her contemporaries such as Jayanthi, Bharathi and Chandrakala among others.

Initially, she was the most favoured actress of ace director Kanagal. Their association produced some of the finest movies in the history of Kannada cinema. Many of their films had strong, hard-hitting messages which were treasured in the cinema history. Kanagal groomed Kalpana to a great extent and though they were romantically linked by the media, industry folks are unanimous that their relationship was that of Guru-Shishya. However, they fell apart when Kanagal refused to offer her a pivotal role in Nagarahaavu. Kanagal went on to groom Aarathi while Kalpana featured in some average films later on. Her efforts to resurrect her career failed. Even though her later movies with Rajkumar (Bidugade, Gandhada Gudi, Daari Tappida Maga and Eradu Kanasu), and Anant Nag (Bayalu Daari) were hits, they failed to resurrect her career. By 1977 she had no movies on hand. She then started focusing on drama companies in Uttara Karnataka and mainly worked in Gudigeri Basavaraj's drama company. With mounting debts and declining film offers, she went into deep depression.

She had also acted in a few Tamil movies, such as Madras to Pondicherry and Sadhu Mirandal which were later made in Hindi as Bombay to Goa and Sadhu Aur Shaitan, respectively. She also acted in Koti Channayya, a Tulu movie, directed by Vishu Kumar and some Malayalam movies like School Master. She lived for only 35 years of which she spent 15 years in the Sandalwood film industry. She won the Karnataka state award for Best Actress thrice for Belli Moda, Hannele Chiguridaga and Sharapanjara. In her film career, she has acted in over eighty movies, of which the majority are in Kannada.

== Legacy ==
The sway that actor Kalpana – who had won the title "Minugu Taare" (twinkling star) – held over Kannada film enthusiasts has not quite disappeared since her death. Known for playing complex and tragic roles, she died under mysterious circumstances. She ruled the Kannada film industry from 1967 until 1972.

V. Sreedhara, a teacher in Mysuru, has brought out a 1,114-page volume "Rajatha Rangada Dhruvathare", chronicling her life and work spanning 79 films. It has details of the characters she played and opinions of various directors, co-artistes and writers. He started working on the book at 21 and completed it when he turned 27. "Even after working for so long, I have not completely understood the persona of Kalpana, as she was a complex person", he says. The book was released in Bengaluru at a function organised by Karnataka Chalanachitra Academy.

=== Fashion icon ===
Kalpana was a fashion icon of her time. Her elegance, taste and sophistication in dressing could not be matched by other female stars of the time. The mega sleeve blouses, frill blouses are her contribution to Karnataka's style. Some of her fashion statements are elaborate hairdos, big rings on fingers, rich zari saris and chiffon saris, multiple bangles and long necklaces.

== Death ==
Kalpana died on 12 May 1979 under mysterious circumstances, apparently ending her own life. Her suicide was attributed to multiple causes from health issues, poor financial condition to failed romance, though nothing was established. As per post-mortem reports, she had consumed 56 sleeping pills. She had spent her last days at an inspection bungalow at Gotur near Sankeshwar, Belagavi, Karnataka.

== Filmography ==
=== Kannada films ===
Year	Film	Role	Notes	Ref.
1963	Saaku Magalu	Uma	Debut	
1964	Naandi	Nirmala		
1964	Pathiye Daiva			
1964	Chinnada Gombe	Radha		
1964	Kavaleradu Kulavandu	Sangeetha		
1966	Mantralaya Mahatme	Tulasi	Special appearance	
1966	Bala Nagamma	Manikya Devi		
1966	Sri Kanyaka Parameshwari Kathe	Goddess Parvathi		
1967	Belli Moda	Indira		
1967	Padavidhara			
1967	Immadi Pulikeshi	Vasantika		
1967	Dhana Pishachi	Asha		
1967	Bangarada Hoovu	Seetha		
1967	Premakkoo Permitte	Viji		
1968	Gandhinagara	Shanta		
1968	Mahasathi Arundathi			
1968	Sarvamangala	Mangala		
1968	Hannele Chiguridaga	Malathi		
1968	Ananda Kanda			
1968	Anna Thamma			
1968	Hoovu Mullu	Cheluvi		
1968	Mannina Maga	Mallika		
1969	Odahuttidavaru	Asharani		
1969	Kappu Bilupu	Vatsala/Chandra	Double role	
1969	Uyyale	Radha		
1969	Mathrubhoomi	Seetha		
1969	Kaanike			
1969	Mukunda Chandra			
1969	Brundavana	Radha		
1969	Gejje Pooje	Chandramathi		
1969	Namma Makkalu	Suma	Special appearance	
1970	Arishina Kumkuma	Radha Devi		
1970	Anirikshita	Jayashree		
1970	Pratheekara			
1970	Karulina Kare	Parvati		
1970	Vaagdana	Parvati		
1970	Namma Mane	Shobha		
1970	Seetha	Seetha		
1970	Devara Makkalu	Kanaka		
1970	Mukthi	Sarojini		
1971	Onde Kula Onde Daiva			
1971	Sharapanjara	Kaveri		
1971	Bhale Adrushtavo Adrushta	Kalpana		
1971	Sothu Geddavalu	Sharada		
1972	Nari Munidare Mari	Hema		
1972	Subhadra Kalyana	Subhadra		
1972	Uttara Dakshina	Mamatha Mukherjee		
1972	Yaava Janmada Maitri	Lalitha		
1972	Naa Mechida Huduga	Pramila Rao		
1972	Mareyada Deepavali	Anu		
1973	Bidugade	Shobha	Special appearance	
1973	Triveni	Triveni		
1973	Gandhada Gudi	Lakshmi		
1973	Kesarina Kamala	Kamala		
1974	Eradu Kanasu	Gowri		
1974	Idu Namma Desha			
1975	Mantra Shakthi			
1975	Nireekshe	Malini		
1975	Beluvalada Madilalli	Girija		
1975	Daari Tappida Maga	Pramila		
1976	Bayalu Daari	Chandra		
1976	Vijaya Vani	Vani		
1976	Rajanarthakiya Rahasya			
1978	Sandarbha	Herself	Cameo	
1978	Vamsha Jyothi	Sharada Devi		
1978	Maleya Makkalu			
1978	Anuraga Bandhana		Last release	

=== Other language films ===
Year	Film	Role	Language	Notes	Ref.
1964	School Master	Vasanthi	Malayalam		
1964	Karnan	Fairy Goddess	Tamil		
1966	Madras to Pondicherry	Mala	Tamil		
1966	Sadhu Mirandal	Kalpana	Tamil		
1966	Mayor Nair		Malayalam		
1967	Pattathu Rani		Tamil		
1972	Menakodalu		Malayalam		
1973	Kattila Thottila	Padmini	Tamil		
1973	Koti Chennayya	Kinnidaru	Tulu		
1974	Yer Malthina Thappu		Tulu		
1975	Thennangkeetru	Malini	Tamil		

== Awards ==
Filmfare Awards South

- Best Actress – Kannada – Yaava Janmada Maitri (1972)

Karnataka State Film Awards

- Best Actress – Belli Moda (1967)
- Best Actress – Hannele Chiguridaga (1968)
- Best Actress – Sharapanjara (1971)

== Bibliography ==
- Rajadhyaksha, Ashish; Willemen, Paul (1998) [1994]. Encyclopaedia of Indian Cinema. British Film Institute and Oxford University Press. ISBN 0-19-563579-5.
