= Mala Rao =

British Indian physician

Mala Rao CBE
- Born: Mala Rao; Chennai
- Education: Delhi University; London School of Hygiene and Tropical Medicine (PhD)
- Scientific career
- Fields: Public health
- Workplaces: Imperial College London; NHS England; University of East London
- Thesis: Assessing the quality of care in general practice : is the general practice assessment survey an adequate summary measure for a practical approach to clinical governance in primary care organisations?
- Website: www.thet.org/advisors/professor-mala-rao-obe/

Mala Rao CBE is a British Indian physician who is a senior clinical fellow in the department of primary care at Imperial College London. She served as a medical adviser to NHS England and a vice chair of WaterAid. Her research investigates the impact of climate change and eco-anxiety on public health.

== Early life and education ==
Rao was born in India. She decided to become a doctor as a child and studied medicine in Delhi. At the time, the world was fighting to eradicate smallpox, and Rao decided she would specialise in public health. She was a postgraduate student at the University of London, where she completed a National Health Service (NHS) training programme at the London School of Hygiene and Tropical Medicine.

== Research and career ==
Rao remained in the United Kingdom, where she became a consultant in public health. She served as Director of Public Health in Essex in 1989 and 1992 to 2004. She established the UK's first evidenced-based network to assess cancer. In the late 1980s, Rao became concerned about the impact of climate change on human health. Rao returned to India as the inaugural Director of Public Health Foundation of India's first Indian Institute of Public Health from 2008 till 2011.She remained in India until 2014, undertaking research and working with the national and state Governments to evaluate the impacts of health financing innovation and piloting new models of primary care as a key platform for universal access to affordable health care

Rao has campaigned to raise awareness about the impact of climate change and eco-anxiety on patients health and mental health. To this end, she has served on various government task forces, and delivered several public lectures. She wrote The Health Practitioner’s Guide to Climate Change, which was highly commended in the British Medical Association public health awards.

In 2014, Rao launched an investigation into the wellbeing of black and minority ethnic populations in England. She established the Imperial College London ethnicity and health unit, where she investigated health inequalities in the NHS workforce, in the general population and in health research.

In 2004, Rao was appointed head of the england public health workforce and led the London Department of Health. She was appointed a medical adviser to NHS England's Workforce Race Equality Strategy between 2018 and 2022.

== Honours and awards ==
Rao was appointed Officer of the Order of the British Empire (OBE) in the 2013 New Year Honours for services to public health in the UK and overseas and Commander of the Order of the British Empire (CBE) in the 2024 New Year Honours for services to public health, the NHS, equality and diversity.

- 2021 Awarded the Alwyn Smith Prize by the Faculty of Public Health (FPH)
- 2022 Elected an honorary member of the Royal College of Paediatrics and Child Health (RCPCH)

== Selected publications ==
- M. B. Rao; A. M. Tanksale; M. S. Ghatge; V. V. Deshpande (1998). "Molecular and biotechnological aspects of microbial proteases" (PDF). Microbiology and Molecular Biology Reviews. 62 (3): 597–635. doi:10.1128/mmbr.62.3.597-635.1998. PMC 98927. PMID 9729602. Wikidata Q24548591.
- Neeta Kulkarni; Abhay Shendye; Mala Rao (1999). "Molecular and biotechnological aspects of xylanases". FEMS Microbiology Reviews. 23 (4): 411-56, 411-456. doi:10.1016/s0168-6445(99)00006-6. PMID 10422261. Wikidata Q28140563.
- Bhosale SH; Rao MB; Deshpande VV (1996). "Molecular and industrial aspects of glucose isomerase". Microbiological Reviews. 60 (2): 280–300. PMC 239444. PMID 8801434. Wikidata Q28776749.
