= Mareyada Haadu =

- Directed by: R. N. Jayagopal
- Written by: R. N. Jayagopal
- Produced by: K. S. Sacchidananda
- Starring: Ananth Nag; Manjula; Leelavathi
- Cinematography: R. N. K. Prasad
- Edited by: R. Hanumantha Rao
- Music by: G. K. Venkatesh
- Production company: K V S Movies
- Release date: 1981
- Running time: 136 minutes
- Country: India
- Language: Kannada

Mareyada Haadu is a 1981 Kannada-language romance film directed and written by R. N. Jayagopal and produced by K. S. Sacchidananda. The film stars Ananth Nag, Manjula and Leelavathi.

The film was a musical hit with the songs composed by G. K. Venkatesh considered evergreen hits. The cinematographer R. N. K. Prasad was awarded with the Karnataka State Film Award for Best Cinematographer for this film.

== Cast ==
- Ananth Nag as Aanand
- Manjula as Ashwini
- Sundar Krishna Urs as Sundar
- Leelavathi Sundar's mother
- Shivaram
- Rajashankar
- Dingri Nagaraj
- Chethan Ramarao
- Venkatarao

== Soundtrack ==
The music was composed by G. K. Venkatesh, with lyrics by R. N. Jayagopal. The songs composed for the film, especially "Bhuvaneshwariya", which was a record 8 min song which was based on raga Mohana Kalyani and "Sukhada Swapna Gaana", both rendered by S. Janaki, were received extremely well and considered as evergreen songs.

Track listing
No.	Title	Singer(s)	Length
1.	"Bhuvaneshwariya Nenne Manasave"	S. Janaki	08:10
2.	"Rangoli Banali"	S. P. Balasubrahmanyam, S. Janaki	04:12
3.	"Baanalli Thara"	P. B. Sreenivas	04:48
4.	"Jhantar Mantar"	S. Janaki	04:17
5.	"Sukhada Swapna Gaana"	S. Janaki	06:11

== Awards ==
- Karnataka State Film Award for Best Cinematographer – R. N. K. Prasad
