= R. T. Rama =

Indian actress

- Born: 25 June 1949 (age 77); Davanagere, Karnataka, India
- Other name: Kumari Rama
- Occupations: Film actress; dubbing artist; TV soap/serial actress; writer

R.T. Rama is an Indian actress in the Kannada film industry. Her notable films include Gejje Pooje (1969), Gowri (1963), Sharapanjara (1971), and Jedara Bale (1968).

== Awards ==
- Rajyotsava Award (2014)
- Kempegowda Award (2015)

== Career ==
Rama has acted in more than 50 films and numerous Kannada soap operas/serials. A graduate of the National School of Drama, New Delhi, India, she is currently a faculty member at Nagathihalli School of Cinema. She formerly served as a professor at Bangalore University.

== Selected filmography ==
- Mana Mecchida Madadi (1963)
- Mahasathi Anasuya (1965)
- Nanna Kartavya (1965) as Basavi
- Miss Leelavathi (1965)
- Sri Kanyaka Parameshwari Kathe (1966)
- Jedara Bale (1968) as Shantha
- Sri Krishna Rukmini Satyabhama (1971)
- Naa Mechida Huduga (1972)
- Bala Panjara (1972) as Radha

== TV serials and shows ==
- Comedy Khiladigalu Championship (2018) – Team mentor
- Kannadathi (2020–2023) – Mangalamma

== See also ==
- List of people from Karnataka
- Cinema of Karnataka
- List of Indian film actresses
- Cinema of India
