= Haridas Bhattacharya =

Bengali Indian philosopher and author (1891–1956)

- Born: 1891; Bhatpara, Calcutta, Bengal Presidency
- Died: 1956 (aged 64–65); Calcutta, India
- Education: Scottish Church College; University of Calcutta
- Occupations: Philosopher, Educationist, Author
- Spouse: Tapobala Devi

Haridas Bhattacharyya (1891–1956) was a Bengali Indian philosopher, author and educationist, known for his works on comparative religion.

== Early life ==
He was born in an orthodox Brahmin family on 7 November 1891, at Bhatpara, West Bengal to Pandit Ramprasanna Bhattacharyya, a scholar at the princely court of Krishnanagar and a Sanskrit scholar.

== Education ==
After school, Bhattacharyya joined Calcutta's Scottish Church College from where he graduated in 1912. He obtained a master's degree in philosophy from the University of Calcutta in 1914, and a law degree in 1917. During this time, he passed the poetry examination of the Board of Sanskrit Studies. He also won the Premchand Roychand Scholarship and the Mowat gold medal at the Scottish Church College for his thesis on the Evolution of the Soul.

== Career ==
Bhattacharyya joined the Scottish Church College in 1915, as a lecturer of philosophy and logic. Later in 1917, he began teaching philosophy and experimental psychology at the University of Calcutta. After the University of Dhaka was established in 1921, he joined the department of philosophy as a Reader. He served as editor of the journal Dhaka University Studies and as a member of the editorial board of Philosophical Quarterly Journal.

Bhattacharyya delivered many prestigious lectures such as the Stephanos – Nirmalendu Ghosh lectures on Foundations of Living Faiths at the University of Calcutta (1933–34) and the Madanmohan Malavya Commemoration lecture at the Banaras Hindu University. After the partition of 1947, he relocated to the department of Indology at the Banaras Hindu University. He died in Calcutta on 20 January 1956.

== Works ==
=== Books ===
- The Foundations of Living Faiths – An Introduction to Comparative Religion, Calcutta, Motilal Banarsidass, 1938 – Cambridge University Press review, Full text in the Internet Archive
- Editor of the six volume series The Cultural Heritage of India published by The Ramakrishna Mission Institute of Culture, Calcutta, 1936–1940; 2nd enlarged and revised ed. 1958-1962 Full text in the Internet Archive

=== Journals in which he published ===
- The Philosophical Quarterly
- Review of Philosophy and Religion
- Religions of the World
- Dacca University Journal
- Dacca University Studies
- Calcutta Review
- Visva-Bharati Quarterly
- Indian Journal of Psychology
- Journal of the Madras University
