= B. K. Sumitra =

Indian playback singer

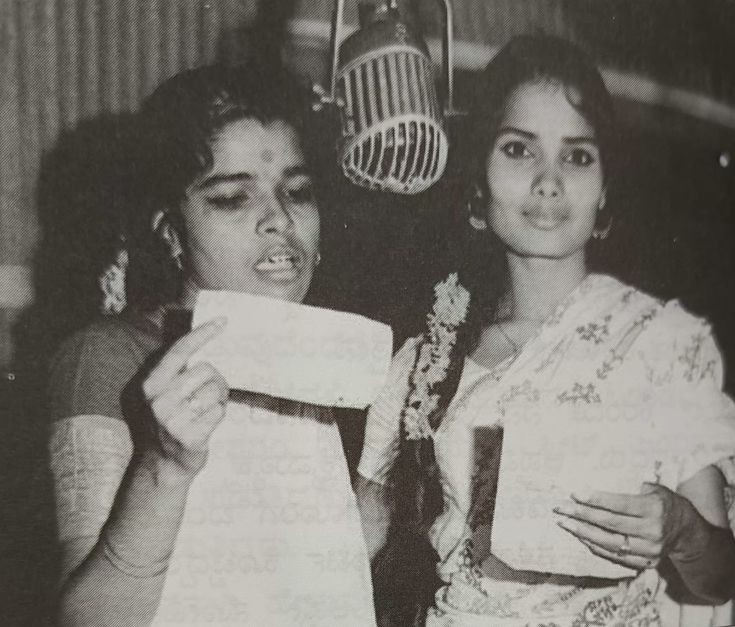
- Sumitra (right) recording a song with Bangalore Latha

Background information
- Born: 27 April 1941 (age 84); Bilalukoppa, Horanadu, Karnataka, India
- Genres: Film; Devotional; Bhavageethe
- Occupation: Playback Singer
- Years active: 1965 – present

Bilalukoppa Krishnayya Sumitra, popularly known as B. K. Sumitra, is an Indian singer known for her work in Kannada films. She is also popular for her numerous devotional and folk songs.

== Personal life ==
Sumitra was born in Bilalukoppa near Horanadu, Karnataka to Gangamma and Krishnayya. The family later moved to Shivamogga, where Sumitra was trained in Carnatic music by M. Prabhakar, the brother of the actress Pandaribai.

Sumitra married M. L. Sudhakar. Her daughter Sowmya Raoh is also a playback singer, while her son Sunil Raoh became a film actor in the Kannada film industry.

== Career ==
Sumitra was noticed by music composer G. K. Venkatesh, who asked her to sing in the film Kavaleredu Kulavandu (1964). In a career spanning more than 40 years, she has worked with many composers including G. K. Venkatesh, R. Sudarsanam, Vijaya Bhaskar, M. Ranga Rao, Rajan–Nagendra, and new generation musicians like Anoop Seelin. Sumitra is active in participating in musical workshops and training students across the state.

== Notable songs ==
- Ninnolume Emagirali Thande (Thande Makkalu)
- A Aa E Ee Kannadada - Karulina Kare (1970)
- Kareya Keli Bande - Anuradha (1967)
- Madhura Madhuravee Manjulagana - Sathi Sukanya (1967)
- Sampige Marada - Upaasane (1947)
- Odi Baa Ododi Baa - Chakratheertha (1967)
- Maneye Brundavana - (Brundavana)
- Eddelu Manjunatha - Eddelu Manjunatha (2009)

== Awards ==
Sumitra's awards include:

- Nadoja honour and Honorary Doctorate from Kannada University, Hampi
- Kempegowda Award
- 1991 – Karnataka Rajyotsava Award
- 1992 – Sangeetha Nrithya Academy Award
- 2017 – G. V. Iyer Award from the Karnataka Film Academy
- 2019 – Lifetime Achievement Award at KIMA Awards
- 2021 – K. Mohandev Alva and Dr. M.K. Shailaja Alva endowment Award from Kannada Sahitya Parishat
