= Mutthu Ondu Mutthu =

- Directed by: R. N. Jayagopal
- Written by: M. K. Indira
- Screenplay by: R. N. Jayagopal
- Based on: Hoobaana by M. K. Indira
- Produced by: B. N. Nagaraju
- Starring: Anant Nag; Roopa Chakravarthi; Sundar Krishna Urs; Vasudeva Rao
- Cinematography: R. N. K. Prasad
- Edited by: R. Hanumantha Rao
- Music by: G. K. Venkatesh
- Production company: Bhagya Kalamandir
- Distributed by: Tallam Distributors
- Release date: 1979
- Running time: 134 minutes
- Country: India
- Language: Kannada

Mutthu Ondu Mutthu is a 1979 Indian Kannada film, directed by R. N. Jayagopal and is based on the novel Hoobaana, written by M. K. Indira. The film stars Anant Nag, Roopa Chakravarthy, Sundar Krishna Urs and Vasudeva Rao in the lead roles. The film has musical score by G. K. Venkatesh.

== Cast ==
- Anant Nag as Anand / Dr. Madhukar
- Roopa Chakravarthy as Mutthu
- Sundar Krishna Urs as Madhukar's father
- M. V. Vasudeva Rao as Venkanna Bhat
- Gangadhar in a guest appearance as Narasimha Bhat
- Shashikala as Leela, Narasimha Bhat wife
- Rajashankar in a guest appearance as Manjayya
- Musuri Krishnamurthy as Vittala Rao
- MS Sathya as Doddayya
- M. S. Umesh
- Dingri Nagaraj as Vijay
- Vinod Mulani as Sundar
- Indu as Malathi
- Rajalakshmi
- Sulochana Venkatachar
- Saroja
- Ma Raviprashanth
- Baby Bindu
