= Gururajulu Naidu =

Indian storyteller

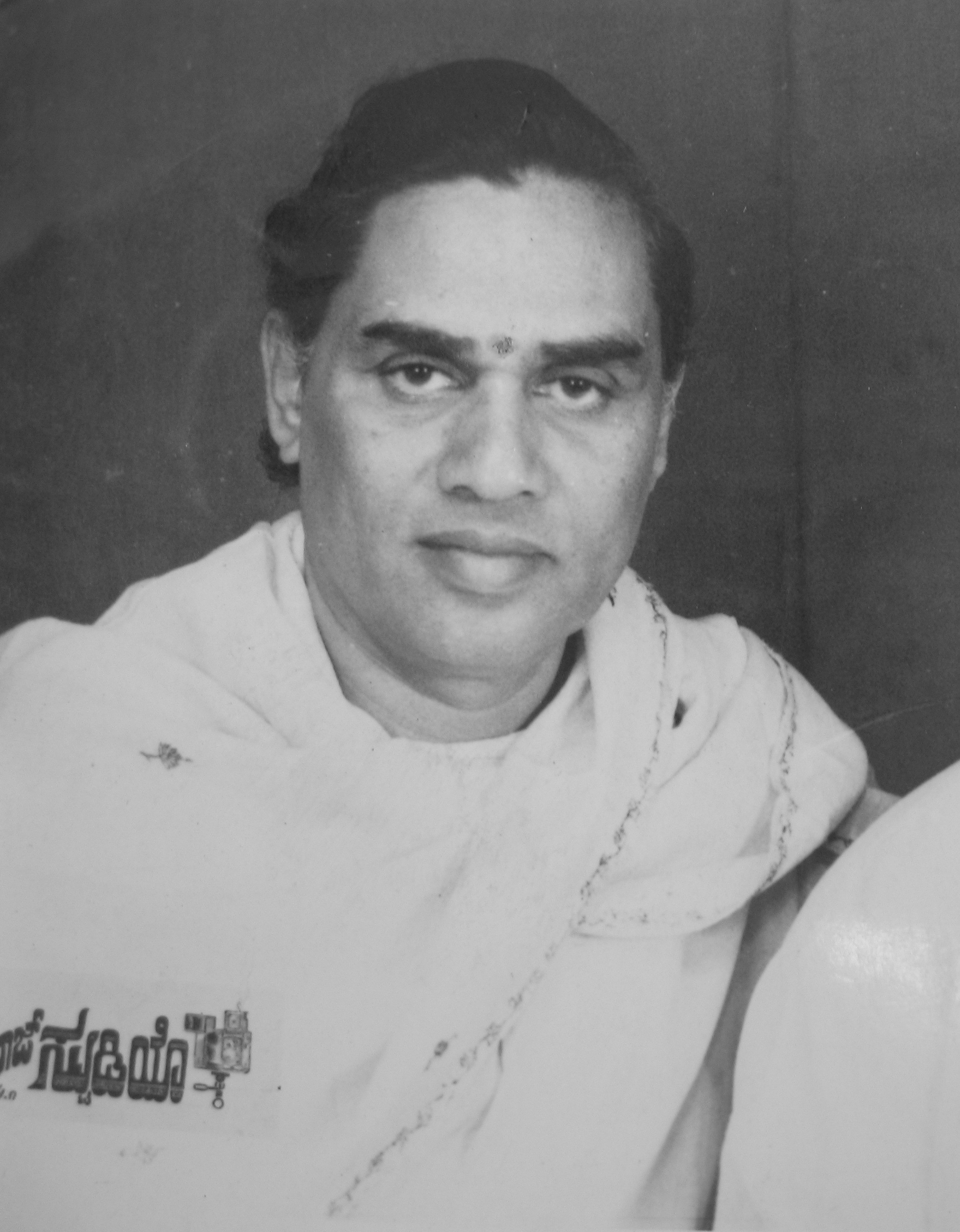
Gururajulu Naidu

Gururajulu Naidu (1931–1985) was a Harikathe storyteller. He was known as Harikathe pitamaha of Karnataka, and along with Achyuta Dasa and Keshava Dasa, he formed the trinity of Harikatha Vidwans. Gururajulu Naidu's Harikathe stories include Renukadevi Mahatme, Bhookailasa, Bheema Jarasandha and Bhakta Sudama. He helped to popularise Harikathe in Karnataka by recording albums of the stories.

Gururajulu Naidu trained Harikatha to several disciples, including Shri N. Suryanarayanadas, Smt. Kumari Malini and LakshmanaDas. His harmonist was Vidwan Shivaramu.

Gururajulu Naidu was also known by the name Arun Kumar in the Kannada film industry. He acted in movies including Madhu Malathi, Hannele Chiguridaga and Mooroovare Vajragalu which co-starred Rajkumar. He also acted with Madhavi in Shivakanye. In Bangalore, in his honor, a roundabout is named by the municipality as "Gururajulu Naidu Vruttha".

His daughters also are Harikatha vidwans.

== Style ==
Gururajulu Naidu's style of Harikathe was far removed from the slow and traditional style. It was fast-paced, interspersed with many humorous stories. Each Harikathe is about 90 minutes long. Though he has been criticised for this by the purists, Gururajulu Naidu's work was immensely popular. The content here is very less compared to the mahatma's true abilities.

Some of his popular performances are:

1. Bhaktha Markendeya
2. Bhaktha Siriyala
3. MahiRavana
4. Maya Bazaar
5. Nallathanga Devi
6. Gaja Gowri Vratha
7. Shri Krishna Garudie
8. Lava Kusha
9. Nakku Nagisi Aluva Maresu
10. Bhaktha Sudhama
11. Bheema Jharasandha
12. Girija Kalyana
13. Mooruvare Vajragalu
14. Kiratarjuna
15. Sathya Harishchandra
16. Uttarana Paurusha
17. Chandrahaasa
18. Maruthi Vijaya
19. Santha Sakku Bhai
20. Koluru Kodu Gusu
21. Ayyappa Swamy
22. Babru Vahana
23. Muruvare Vajragalu
24. Bhukailasa
25. Nala Damayanthi
26. Shani Prabhava
27. The Ramayana (in four parts)
28. Renuka Devi Mahathme
29. Bhakta Kumbara
30. Santha Ganeshwara
