= Kavaleradu Kulavandu =

KavalereDu Kulavondu
- Directed by: T. V. Singh Thakur
- Story by: Sridhar
- Produced by: A. C. Narasimha Murthy
- Starring: Udaykumar; Jayanthi
- Cinematography: B. Dorairaj
- Edited by: Venkatram; Raghupathi
- Music by: G. K. Venkatesh
- Production company: Shailashree Productions
- Release date: 1964
- Country: India
- Language: Kannada

Kavaleredu Kulavandu is a 1964 Indian Kannada film, directed by T. V. Singh Thakur and produced by A. C. Narasimha Murthy. The film stars Udaykumar and Jayanthi in the lead roles. The film has musical score by G. K. Venkatesh.

== Cast ==
- Udaykumar as Sundar
- T. N. Balakrishna
- Vijayarao
- Ganapathi Bhat
- Kuppuraj
- Sridhar
- Jayakumar
- Ramamurthy
- Nanjappa
- Srinivas
- Basappa
- Master Gopal
- Master Basavaraj
- Jayanthi as Rani
- Kalpana as Sangeetha
- Advani Lakshmi Devi as Lakshmi
- Ramesh
- Baby Prashanth
