= Hrudaya Pallavi =

- Directed by: R. N. Jayagopal
- Written by: R. N. Jayagopal
- Produced by: Kurunji Shivaram; Smt Jaya Shivaram
- Starring: Charanraj; Geetha; Ramakrishna; Pavithra
- Cinematography: R. N. K. Prasad
- Edited by: R. Hanumantha Rao
- Music by: M. Ranga Rao
- Production company: Sri Jai Santhoshi Films International
- Release date: 14 April 1987
- Country: India
- Language: Kannada

Hrudaya Pallavi is a 1987 Indian Kannada-language film, directed by R. N. Jayagopal and produced by Kurunji Shivaram and Jaya Shivaram. The film stars Srinath, Geetha, Ramakrishna and Pavithra. The film has musical score by M. Ranga Rao. The film was a remake of Tamil film Kaalangalil Aval Vasantham.

== Cast ==
- Srinath
- Geetha
- Ramakrishna
- Pavithra
- Charanraj in Guest Appearance
- R. N. Sudarshan in Guest Appearance
- Dinesh
- Sadashiva Brahmavar
- Bangalore Nagesh
- Jayagopal
- Sathyabhama
- Manjula Subbanna
- Shanthi
- Baby Usha
- K. S. Sathyanarayana
- Jackie Shivakumar
- S. Anand
- Nagaraj
- Murthy
- Srishaila
- Sringeri Sanjeeva
- Sharma
- Rathnakara Shetty

== Soundtrack ==
The music was composed by M. Ranga Rao.

No.	Song	Singers	Lyrics	Length (m:ss)
1	"Akashadinda Banda"	S. P. Balasubrahmanyam, Vani Jairam	R. N. Jayagopal	
2	"Nee Baro Dariyali"	P. Susheela	R. N. Jayagopal	04:58
3	"Raagake Swaravagi"	S. P. Balasubrahmanyam, Vani Jairam	R. N. Jayagopal	03:44
4	"Ramanama Payasakke"	S. P. Balasubrahmanyam, Kasturi Shankar	Purandaradasa	01:45
5	"Hrudaya Pallavi"	Bangalore Latha, Sunder	R. N. Jayagopal	02:39
6	"Hrudaya Thumbi"	Vani Jairam	R. N. Jayagopal	04:24
