= R. Nagendra Rao =

Indian filmmaker, theatre personality

- Born: Rattihalli Nagendra Rao; 23 June 1896; Holalkere, Kingdom of Mysore, British India
- Died: 9 February 1977 (aged 80)
- Occupations: Actor, film director, producer, screenwriter, composer
- Spouses: Ratna Bai; Kamala Bai
- Children: 4, including: R. N. K. Prasad; R. N. Jayagopal; R. N. Sudarshan
- Awards: Padma Shri (1976)

Rattihalli Nagendra Rao (23 June 1896 – 9 February 1977) was an Indian theatre actor, film actor and director in South Indian cinema. Following his career in theatre, Rao turned to film a where he became an actor, director, producer, screenwriter and occasional composer. He is considered one of the most influential personalities in the history of South Indian cinema.

For his performance in Hannele Chiguridaga (1968), Rao won the Karnataka State Film Award for Best Actor. Recognized for his contributions to cinema, he was awarded the Padma Shri by the Government of India in 1976. Rao had four children, three of whom were involved in film. His second son, R. N. K. Prasad, was a cinematographer and director, his third son, R. N. Jayagopal, a screenwriter and lyricist and his youngest, R. N. Sudarshan, an actor.

== Early life ==
Nagendra Rao was born on 23 June 1896, in Holalkere, in Kingdom of Mysore in British India.

== Career ==
Rao began his career as an actor in theatre, performing in Kannada language plays at the age of eight. As a child, he portrayed divine female characters such as Sita and historical characters such as Chandramathi and Desdemona. He then switched to male roles, his work proving popular in the erstwhile Kingdom of Mysore and the non-Kannada speaking Madras Presidency. In theatre, he worked with A. V. Varadacharya's Ratnavali Drama Company and Chamundeshwari company, in Mysore.

With the beginning of the talking films era in India in 1931, Rao left for Bombay (now Mumbai). There, he was cast by actor and director P. K. Raja Sandow in the Tamil language films Parijata Pushpaharanam (1932), Narada (1932), Kovalan (1933) and the Telugu language film Ramadasu (1933). Rao appeared in lead roles in the latter two. Following a stint in film, Rao returned to Bangalore and founded the Shri Sahitya Samrajya Nataka Mandali (Shri Sahitya Samrajya Drama Company) with Subbaiah Naidu, an actor and director, who would go on to influence Kannada cinema greatly.

To realize his dream of making a film written in Kannada, he approached Shah Chamanlal Doongaji, a Bangalore businessman, to finance it. With Doongaji choosing Yaragudipati Varada Rao to direct the film, the first talking film in Kannada, Sati Sulochana, was made and finally released on 3 March 1934. Rao played the role of Ravana in the film, and scored the music. His first film as a director came in the 1943 film Satya Harishchandra, which he also produced and starred in.

Rao's play Bhukailasa was thrice made into films; in 1938 and 1940 by Sundar Rao Nadkarni, and in 1958 by K. Shankar. It was in this play that Rajkumar, who would go on to become one of Kannada cinema's finest actors, made his breakthrough as a theatre actor, playing the role of Narada. In 1951, Rao formed his own film production company, RNR Pictures. The 1957 film Premada Putri was produced under this banner and Rao directed it, also playing a supporting role in the film. At the 5th National Film Awards, the film was awarded the Best Feature Film in Kannada. The production company existed until 1964. Following this, he appeared in the roles of a father in films such as Shri Kannika Parameshwari Kathe (1966) and Karulina Kare (1970). For his role in his 1968 film Hannele Chiguridaga, that co-stars Rajkumar, he won the Karnataka State Film Award for Best Actor. His last appearance came in the 1974 film Professor Huchuraya.

== Filmography ==
Year	Film	Language	Functioned as					Notes
Year	Film	Language	Director	Producer	Screenwriter	Actor	Role	Notes
1932	Ramadasu	Telugu				Yes		Lead role
1933	Parijatha Pushpaharunam	Tamil				Yes	Narada	
1933	Kovalan	Tamil				Yes		Lead role
1934	Sati Sulochana	Kannada			Yes	Yes	Ravana	First Kannada sound film
1935	Naveena Sadarame	Tamil				Yes		
1940	Bhookailas	Telugu				Yes	Narada	
1941	Vasantsena	Kannada		Yes	Yes	Yes	Sakara	Supporting role
1943	Satya Harishchandra	Kannada	Yes	Yes	Yes	Yes	Vishvamitra	Supporting role
1947	Mahatma Kabir	Kannada	Yes			Yes		
1949	Apoorva Sagodharargal	Tamil				Yes	Marthandan	Supporting role
1950	Apoorva Sahodarulu	Telugu				Yes		
1952	Moondru Pillaigal; Mugguru Kodukulu	Tamil Telugu	Yes			Yes		
1953	Chandirani	Telugu; Tamil; Hindi				Yes		
1953	Jataka Phala; Jatakaphalam; Jatakam	Kannada Telugu Tamil	Yes			Yes		
1955	Santosham; Naya Aadmi	Telugu; Hindi				Yes	Dayanidhi	Supporting role
1956	Nagula Chavithi; Adarshasati	Telugu Kannada				Yes		
1956	Renuka Mahatme	Kannada				Yes		
1956	Bhaktha Markandeya	Kannada Telugu				Yes		Supporting role
1957	Bettada Kalla	Kannada				Yes		
1957	Mahiravana	Kannada				Yes		
1957	Premada Putri; Anbe Deivam	Kannada Tamil	Yes	Yes		Yes		National Film Award for Best Feature Film in Kannada
1959	Amudhavalli	Tamil				Yes		
1960	Ranadheera Kanteerava	Kannada				Yes	Vikrama Raya	Supporting role
1961	Vijayanagarada Veeraputra	Kannada	Yes	Yes		Yes		
1962	Gaali Gopura	Kannada				Yes	Govindaiah	
1963	Veera Kesari	Kannada				Yes	Dharma Nayaka	
1963	Ananda Bashpa	Kannada	Yes	Yes		Yes		
1964	Pathiye Daiva	Kannada	Yes			Yes		
1964	Navajeevana	Kannada				Yes		Cameo
1965	Nanna Kartavya	Kannada				Yes		
1965	Balarajana Kathe	Kannada				Yes		
1965	Maduve Maadi Nodu	Kannada				Yes		
1965	Chandrahasa	Kannada				Yes	Chakreshwara	Cameo
1966	Thoogudeepa	Kannada				Yes		
1967	Sri Kanyaka Parameshwari Kathe	Kannada				Yes		Supporting role
1967	Premakkoo Permitte	Kannada	Yes			Yes		
1967	Nakkare Ade Swarga	Kannada				Yes		
1967	Shri Purandaradasaru	Kannada				Yes	Krishna	
1967	Janara Jana	Kannada				Yes		
1968	Hannele Chiguridaga	Kannada				Yes	Anantha	Karnataka State Film Award for Best Actor
1968	Attegondukala Sosegondukala	Kannada				Yes		Supporting role
1969	Kannu Muchale	Kannada				Yes		
1969	Grihalakshmi	Kannada				Yes		
1969	Namma Makkalu	Kannada	Yes			Yes		
1969	Makkale Manege Manikya	Kannada				Yes		
1970	Nadina Bhagya	Kannada	Yes			Yes	Dharmaiah	
1970	Sri Krishnadevaraya	Kannada				Yes		
1970	Lakshmi Saraswathi	Kannada				Yes		
1970	Karulina Kare	Kannada				Yes	Subbanna	
1971	Aliya Geleya	Kannada				Yes	Rao Bahadur Ranga Rao	
1971	Sakshatkara	Kannada				Yes	Ajjayya	
1971	Kula Gourava	Kannada				Yes	Kala's grandfather	Cameo
1971	Naguva Hoovu	Kannada				Yes		
1972	Kalavari Kutumbam	Telugu				Yes		
1972	Naa Mechida Huduga	Kannada				Yes	N. G. Rao	
1973	Mannina Magalu	Kannada				Yes		
1973	Prema Pasha	Kannada				Yes		
1974	Professor Huchuraya	Kannada				Yes	Shama Shastry	
