= R. N. Sudarshan =

Indian film actor

- Born: Rattihalli Nagendra Sudarshan; 2 May 1939; Karnataka, British India
- Died: 8 September 2017 (aged 78); Bangalore, Karnataka, India
- Occupations: Actor, singer, film producer
- Years active: 1961–2017
- Spouse: Shylashri
- Parent(s): R. Nagendra Rao; Ratnabai
- Family: R. N. K. Prasad (brother); R. N. Jayagopal (brother)

Rattihalli Nagendra Sudarshan (2 May 1939 – 8 September 2017) was an Indian actor and producer who mainly worked in Kannada cinema. He also acted in Tamil, Hindi, Telugu, and Malayalam films. During a career spanning more than five decades, he acted in more than 250 films.

== Personal life ==
R. N. Sudarshan was the son of veteran actor R. Nagendra Rao. His elder brother R. N. Jayagopal (died 2008) was a famous lyricist and eldest brother R. N. K. Prasad (died 2012) was a famous cinematographer. He was married to actress Shylashri.

== Career ==
In 1961, Sudarshan was launched as lead actor in the Kannada film field at age 21 in Vijayanagarada Veeraputra, and he was the lead for over 60 films before appearing in villainous roles.

Sudarshan was honoured with the prestigious Dr. Rajkumar Lifetime Achievement Award of 2009–10.

== Death ==
He died on 8 September 2017 from kidney disease, aged 78.

== Filmography ==
=== Films ===
==== Kannada ====
- Vijayanagarada Veeraputhra (1961)
- Ananda Bashpa (1963)
- Pathiye Daiva (1964)
- Mangala Muhurta (1964)
- Navajeevana (1964)
- Chandrahasa (1965)
- Suvarna Bhoomi (1968)
- Kadina Rahasya (1969)
- Lakshmi Saraswathi (1970)
- Aaru Mooru Ombhatthu (1970)...Sripathi
- Nadina Bhagya (1970)
- Karulina Kare (1970)
- Thande Makkalu (1971)
- Naguva Hoovu (1971)
- Mareyada Deepavali (1972)
- Maria My Darling (1980)...Stephen
- Havina Hede (1981)
- Chanakya (1984)
- Mooru Janma (1984)
- Rudranaga (1984)
- Khaidi (1984)
- Prachanda Kulla (1984)
- Samayada Gombe (1984)...Dharmadasa
- Kartavya (1985)
- Belli Naaga (1986)
- Hrudaya Pallavi (1987)...cameo
- Brahma Vishnu Maheshwara (1988)
- Bidisada Bandha (1989)...Mallikarjuna Rao
- Kaliyuga Bheema (1991)
- Shivanaga (1992)
- Mata (2006)
- Kodagana Koli Nungitha (2008)
- Mast Maja Maadi (2008)
- Super (2010)
- Double Decker (2011)
- Dashamukha (2012)
- Navika (2012)
- Chaarulatha (2012)
- Cool Ganesha (2013)
- Pungi Daasa (2014)
- Huccha Venkat (2014)
- Uppi 2 (2015)...legislator

==== Tamil ====
- Sumathi En Sundari (1971)
- Maria My Darling (1980)
- Oomai Ullangal (1981) - "Thulir Vidum Kalam" - as a singer with Janaki
- Pagadai Panirendu (1982)
- Nenjangal (1982) as Bairava
- Theerpu (1982) as Alexander
- Neethibathi (1983)
- Sandhippu (1983)
- Paayum Puli (1983)
- Punnagai Mannan (1986) as Ranjani's father
- Nayakan (1987)
- Velaikaaran (1987)
- En Rathathin Rathame (1989) as Narendra Bhupathy
- Ulle Veliye (1993)
- Ramanaa (2002)
- Paarijatham (2006)
- Chaarulatha (2012)

==== Telugu ====
- Kotalo Paga (1976) as Sanjeeva Raya
- Yamakinkarudu (1982)
- Gudachari No.1 (1983) as Supreme
- Puli Debba (1983) as Jayaram
- Chandirani (1983)
- James Bond 999 (1984) as Chatterjee
- Pralaya Simham (1984) as Rabandhu Sodharudu 1
- Rakta Sindhuram (1985) as Bheemaraju
- Prachanda Bhairavi (1985) as Martanda
- Mantra Dandam (1985)
- Puli (1985) as Naagu
- Kutra (1986) as Sudarshan Rao
- Sthree Sahasam (1987) as Vajramuni
- August 15 Raatri (1988)
- Mr. Hero (1988)
- Rao Gari Intlo Rowdy (1990)

==== Malayalam ====
- Pournami Raavil 3D (1985)
- Jackpot (1993)
- Rudraksham (1994)

=== Television ===
- Marmadesam -Ragasiyam as Rungarajan
- Maya Machindra
- Velan as Brahmarakshasan
- Maragatha Veenai
- Agnisakshi
- My Dear Bhootham as Li Swan (Main Antagonist)
