= R. N. Jayagopal =

Indian director and songwriter (1935–2008)

- Born: 17 August 1935; Mysore, Kingdom of Mysore, British India
- Died: 19 May 2008 (aged 72); Chennai, Tamil Nadu, India
- Other name: RNJ
- Occupations: Lyricist, film director
- Years active: 1957–2008
- Spouse: Lalita Jayagopal
- Children: 1
- Parent: R. Nagendra Rao
- Family: R. N. Sudarshan (brother); R. N. K. Prasad (brother)
- Website: www.rnjayagopal.com

R. N. Jayagopal (1935 – 19 May 2008) was an Indian film director and lyricist in Kannada cinema. He had written over 12,000 film songs.

== Early life and education ==
R. N. Jayagopal, known to friends and fans as RNJ, was born in 1935 to R. Nagendra Rao, an influential figure of Kannada cinema. He did his primary and college education in Bangalore. He learnt Carnatic music from B. S. Raj Iyengar and was good at playing the violin. Jayagopal was one of four sons of his parents. His other famous siblings were older brother R. N. K. Prasad, who was a cinematographer, and younger brother R. N. Sudarshan, a veteran film actor and producer.

== Career ==
Jayagopal entered the film industry by writing the lyrics of "Tribhuvana Janani Jaganmohini" for the 1957 film Premada Putri produced by his father. From then on, he wrote script, dialogue and lyrics for hundreds of films. He had directed eight films, including Dhumaketu, Kesarina Kamala and Avala Antaranga. He won the State award as best dialogue writer for Namma Makkalu and Pallavi Anu Pallavi, which was Mani Ratnam's first film.

He did direct many serials as well, but he remained preoccupied by writing lyrics for Kannada films. His lyrics were meaningful and had a high degree of lyrical value. Many of his songs have been hugely successful not only for the tune composition, but as well for the quality of the songs.

Jayagopal worked in the company of other great writers like Chi. Udaya Shankar, Vijaya Narasimha, Sorat Ashwath, Hunsur Krishnamurthy and others.

Jayagopal started the first school in Chennai to offer Kannada as a second language - Vidya Vinaya Vinoda Mat. Hr. Sec. School. He also made his mark in the Tamil film industry with his well acclaimed roles in movies like Nayakan and Michael Madana Kama Rajan.

== Notable lyrics ==
- "Haadonda Haaduve Nee Kelu Maguve"
- "Neerinalli Aleya Ungura"
- "Sanyaasi Sanyaasi Arjuna Sanyaasi"
- "Bellimodadha Anchinindha"
- "Gaganavu Ello Bhoomiyu Ello"
- "Nee Bandu Nintaga Nintu Neenu Nakkaga"
- "Nagu Endhidhe Manjina Bindu"
- "Naguva Nayana Madhura Mouna"
- "Raagake Swaravagi, Swarake Padavaagi"
- "Noorondu Nenapu Yedeyaaladinda"
- "Premada Kaadambari Baredanu Kanneerali"

== Filmography ==
=== As lyricist ===
Year	Movie	Language	Songs
2010	Gubbi	Kannada	
2008	Psycho	Kannada	
1996	Jeevanadhi	Kannada	all songs
1994	Mandyada Gandu	Kannada	
1992	Sindhoora Thilaka	Kannada	
1991	Lion Jagapathi Rao	Kannada	
1990	Shruti	Kannada	
1989	Rudra	Kannada	
1988	Krishna Rukmini	Kannada	
1998	Dharmathma	Kannada	
1988	Jananayaka	Kannada	
1988	Dada	Kannada	
1988	Anjada Gandu	Kannada	
1987	Sathyam Shivam Sundaram	Kannada	
1986	Malaya Marutha	Kannada	
1986	Africadalli Sheela	Kannada	
1986	Kathanayaka	Kannada	
1985	Swabhimana	Kannada	
1985	Bidugadeya Bedi	Kannada	
1985	Sedina Hakki	Kannada	
1984	Rudranaga	Kannada	
1984	Bandhana	Kannada	
1983	Sididedda Sahodara	Kannada	
1983	Aasha	Kannada	all songs
1983	Nyaya Gedditu	Kannada	all songs
1983	Pallavi Anu Pallavi	Kannada	all songs
1982	Tony	Kannada	
1982	Sahasa Simha	Kannada	
1981	Maha Prachandaru	Kannada	
1980	Makkala Sainya	Kannada	
1978	Kiladi Kittu	Kannada	
1978	Maathu Tappada Maga	Kannada	all songs
1978	Madhura Sangama	Kannada	
1977	Chinna Ninna Muddaduve	Kannada	all songs
1976	Baalu Jenu	Kannada	
1976	Raja Nanna Raja	Kannada	
1976	Premada Kaanike	Kannada	
1975	Onde Roopa Eradu Guna	Kannada	
1975	Kalla Kulla	Kannada	
1973	Edakallu Guddada Mele	Kannada	
1972	Bangarada Manushya	Kannada	
1972	Mareyada Deepavali	Kannada	
1972	Naagarahaavu	Kannada	
1972	Naa Mechida Huduga	Kannada	
1972	Sipayi Ramu	Kannada	
1971	Kulagaurava	Kannada	
1971	Kasturi Nivasa	Kannada	
1970	Seetha	Kannada	
1968	Dhoomakethu	Kannada	all songs except Eko Ee dina
1965	Sathi Saavitri	Kannada	all songs

=== As director ===
Year	Film	Notes
1968	Dhoomakethu	Also wrote screenplay, dialogues and lyrics
1972	Naa Mechida Huduga	Also wrote screenplay, dialogues and lyrics
1973	Kesarina Kamala	Also wrote screenplay, dialogues and lyrics
1979	Mutthu Ondu Mutthu	Also wrote screenplay, dialogues and lyrics
1981	Mareyada Haadu	Also wrote story, screenplay, dialogues and lyrics
1983	Makkale Devaru	Also wrote dialogues and lyrics
1984	Avala Antharanga	
1987	Hrudaya Pallavi	Also wrote screenplay, dialogues and lyrics

=== As actor ===
- Nayagan (1987; Tamil)
- Michael Madhana Kamarajan (1990; Tamil)
- Jeevanadhi (1996; Kannada)

== Awards ==
Karnataka State Film Awards

- 1968-69 : Best Dialogue – Namma Makkalu (1969)
- 1982-83 : Best Dialogue – Pallavi Anu Pallavi (1983)
- 1985-86: Special Award (Lyrics) – Swabhimana (1985)

== Death ==
He died on 19 May 2008 at the age of 72 following a cardiac arrest. His wife Lalita Jayagopal died two years later, on 13 June 2010.
