= List of Kannada films of the 1940s =

This is a list of Kannada feature films released in the 1940s.

== Top-grossing films ==
Rank	Year	Title	Collection	Ref.
1.	1949	Nagakannika	₹10 lakh (₹36.5 crore in 2025)	
2.	1943	Satya Harishchandra	₹8 lakh (₹70.97 crore in 2025)	
3.	1941	Vasantasena	₹6 lakh (₹23.22 crore in 2025)	
4.	1947	Mahatma Kabir	₹5 lakh (₹6.8 crore in 2025)	
5.	1947	Krishna Leela	₹3 lakh (₹4.08 crore in 2025)	

== List ==
The list of Kannada feature films released by the Kannada film Industry located in Bangalore, Karnataka in the 1940s.

Year	Title	Director(s)	Cast	Production House
1941	Subhadra	C. Pullaiah	Gubbi Veeranna, Honnappa Bhagavathar, B. Jayamma, Vasudeva Girimaji, B. Raghavendra Rao	Veeranna, Aacharya
1941	Vasantasena	Ramayyar Shirur	Lakshmi Bai, Subbaiah Naidu, R. Nagendra Rao, Kamala Bai, P. Kalinga Rao, Padma Devi	Pragathi Pictures
1942	Bhakta Prahalada	K. Subramanyam, C. S. V. Iyer	M. V. Rajamma, Chandramma, A.N. Sheshachar	Kalaivani Films
1942	Jeevana Nataka	Wahab Kashmiri	Gubbi Veeranna, Kemparaj Urs, B. Jayamma, Shantha Hublikar	Gubbi & C S Films
1943	Satya Harishchandra	R. Nagendra Rao	Subbaiah Naidu, R. Nagendra Rao, Lakshmibai, J. V. Krishnamurthy Rao, M. G. Marirao	Saraswathi Cine Film Laboratory Ltd; SSS Nataka Mandali
1943	Krishna Sudhaama	K. Subramanyam	Bellave Narahari Sastry, S. D. Subbulakshmi	Kalaivani Films
1944	Vani	K. Hirannaiah; M. N. Gopal	Tirumakudalu Chowdiah, Bellary Lalitha, Pandari Bai, Bellary Rathnamala, Musuri Krishnamurthy, K. V. Achutharao, K. Hirannaiah	HRGC Sri Pictures
1944	Radha Ramana	Jyothi Sinha	B. R. Panthulu, M. V. Rajamma, G. V. Iyer, Balakrishna, Bhanumathi, Srinivasarao	Sri Vijaya Films
1946	Hemareddy Mallamma	S. Soundarya Rajan	Gubbi Veeranna, Honnappa Bhagavathar, C. B. Mallappa, B. Jayamma, Ku. Ra. Seetharama Sastry	Gubbi Sri Chennabasaveshwara Films
1947	Chandrahasa	Shanthesh Patel	Handiganoor Siddaramappa, Amirbai Karnataki, Vikas, B. Sharada	Pampa Pictures
1947	Krishnaleela	C. V. Raju	Kemparaj Urs, Marirao, Usha, Bellary Lalitha, Rathnamala, Nagarathna	Mahatma Pictures
1947	Mahananda	T. Janakiram	Kemparaj Urs, Sumathi, Kashinath, Vedaantham, Padmanabhan, Rajakumari, Prathimadevi	Thriveni Films, Nehru Pictures
1947	Mahathma Kabir	R. Nagendra Rao	Subbaiah Naidu, R. Nagendra Rao, Lakshmibai, Kamalabai	Ganesh Pictures, Pragathi Pictures
1947	Rajasuya Yaga	T. Dwarkanath	K. R. Seetharam, K. V. Achyutha Rao, T. Jayamma, T. Chandrashekar	Maskat Pictures
1948	Bhakta Ramdas	Kemparaj Urs	Kemparaj Urs, Vimalananda Das, Sumathi	Mahatma Pictures
1948	Bhakta Kumbara	Bomman D. Irani	Honnappa Bhagavathar, Lakshimibai, Vimalanandadas, Pandari Bai	Surabhi Pictures
1948	Bharathi	R. M. Veerabadraiah	Tanguturi Suryakumari, Sampath, M. V. Krishnaswamy	Raghavendra Pictures
1949	Dasara	B. Y. Ramdas	Shridhar, Saraswathi, Leela, K S Simha	Shanthiram Productions
1949	Kalaavida	Krishnan; Suryanarayana	B. Sohanlal, Kantha, Shantha	Viswakalaasthan Production
1949	Nagakannika	G. Vishwanthan	Jayashri, Bellary Rathnamala, B. Raghavendrarao, S. M. Veerabadrappa, U. Mahabalarao	Mahatma Pictures
1949	Sathi Thulasi	M. V. N. Iyengar	Vimalananda Das, Sushiladevi	Iyengar Productions

== See also ==
- Kannada cinema
