= List of Kannada films of 1960 =

== Top-grossing films ==
Rank	Title	Collection	Ref.
1.	Ranadheera Kanteerava	₹70 lakh (₹66.16 crore in 2025)	
2.	Makkala Rajya	₹50 lakh (₹49.73 crore in 2025)	

== List ==
The following is a list of films produced in the Kannada film industry in India in 1960, presented in alphabetical order.

‡	denotes National Awarded Movie
†	denotes Karnataka State Film Awarded Movie

Title	Director	Cast	Music director	Producer	Banner
Shivalinga Sakshi (ಶಿವಲಿಂಗ ಸಾಕ್ಷಿ)	D. Shankar Singh	K. S. Ashwath, Prathima Devi, Udayakumar	P Shyamanna	D. Shankar Singh	Venkateswara Productions
Ranadheera Kanteerava (ರಣಧೀರ ಕಂಠೀರವ)	N. C. Rajan	Rajkumar, Udaykumar, Leelavathi, Veerabhadrappa, Sandhya, Narasimharaju, Balakrishna, K. S. Ashwath, R. Nagendra Rao	G. K. Venkatesh	Rajkumar; G. V. Iyer; Narasimharaju; Balakrishna	Kannada Chalanachitra Kalavidara Sanga
Rani Honnamma (ರಾಣಿ ಹೊನ್ನಮ್ಮ)	K. R. Seetharama Sastry	Rajkumar, Leelavathi, Lalitharao, Balakrishna, Narasimharaju, Shivajirao, G. V. Iyer	Vijaya Bhaskar	T. S. Karibasayya	Girija Productions
Makkala Rajya (ಮಕ್ಕಳ ರಾಜ್ಯ)	B.R.Panthulu	Sivaji Ganesan, Balakrishna, M. V. Rajamma, M. S. Umesh, M.N Lakshmi Devi, Narasimharaju, B. R. Panthulu	T. G. Lingappa	B. R. Panthulu	M.V.R. Productions
Aasha Sundari (ಆಶಾಸುಂದರಿ)	Hunsur Krishnamurthy	Rajkumar, Harini, Krishnakumari, Lakshmi Devi, Shivashankar, Narasimharaju	Susarla Dakshinamurthi	S. Bhavanarayana	Gowri Productions
Dashavathara (ದಶಾವತಾರ)	P. G. Mohan	Rajkumar, Udaya Kumar, Krishnakumari, Leelavathi, Narasimharaju	G. K. Venkatesh	B. S. Ranga	Vikram Productions
Bhakta Kanakadasa (ಭಕ್ತ ಕನಕದಾಸ) ‡	Y. R. Swamy	Rajkumar, Udaya Kumar, Krishnakumari, H.R. Shashtri, K. S. Ashwath	M. Venkataraju	D. R. Naidu	Shyamprasad Movies

== See also ==
- Kannada films of 1961
