= List of Kannada films of 1961 =

== Top-grossing films ==
Rank	Title	Collection	Ref.
1.	Kittur Chennamma	₹40 lakh (₹38.8 crore in 2025)	
2.	Vijayanagarada Veeraputra	₹25 lakh (₹24 crore in 2025)	

== List ==
The following is a list of films produced in the Kannada film industry in India in 1961, presented in alphabetical order.

‡	denotes National Awarded Movie
†	denotes Karnataka State Film Awarded Movie

Title	Director	Cast	Music director	Producer	Banner
Bhakta Chetha	M. B. Ganesh	Rajkumar, Prathima Devi, Balakrishna	Srinivasa Iyengar	D. Shankar Singh	Venkateshwara Productions
Kaiwara Mahathme	T. V. Singh Thakur	Rajkumar, Leelavathi, G. V. Iyer, Balakrishna, Narasimharaju	G. K. Venkatesh	Kaivara Films Limited	Kaivara Films
Kantheredu Nodu	T. V. Singh Thakur	Rajkumar, Leelavathi, Balakrishna	G. K. Venkatesh	A. K. Velan	Arunachalam Studios
Kittur Chennamma ‡	B. R. Panthulu	Rajkumar, B. Saroja Devi, Leelavathi	T. G. Lingappa	B. R. Panthulu	Padmini Pictures
Nagarjuna	Y. V. Rao	Rajkumar, G. Varalakshmi, Harini, V. Nagayya, K. S. Ashwath, Narasimharaju	Rajan–Nagendra	K. N. Mallikarjuna	Nandi Pictures
Raja Satyavrata	D. Shankar Singh	Udaya Kumar, Balakrishna, Dikki Madhava Rao	M.Venkataraju	N. B. Vatsalan	
Shri Shaila Mahathme	Aaruru Pattabhi	Rajkumar, Dikki Madhava Rao, Sandhya	T. A. Kalyanam	N. Talikerappa	Sri Shaila Pictures
Vijayanagarada Veeraputhra	R. Nagendra Rao	R. Nagendra Rao, R. N. Sudarshan, B. Saroja Devi, Kalyan Kumar, Udaya Kumar, Sandhya, Balakrishna, Narasimharaju	Viswanathan–Ramamoorthy	R. Nagendra Rao	RNR Pictures

== See also ==
- Kannada films of 1960
- Kannada films of 1962
