= Subhadra (disambiguation) =

Subhadra is an important character in the ancient Indian epic Mahabharata.

Subhadra may also refer to:

- Subhadra (film), a 1941 Indian Kannada film
- Subhadra (1995 film), an Indian Odia film starring Sidhant Mohapatra
- Subhadra Kumari Chauhan (1904–1948), Indian poet famous for her Hindi songs
- Subhadra Pradhan (born 1986), member of the India women's national field hockey team
