= Shivalinga Sakshi =

- Directed by: D. Shankar Singh; Chandra Mohan
- Produced by: D. Shankar Singh
- Starring: Udaykumar; Prathima Devi; K. S. Ashwath
- Cinematography: K. Govinda Swamy
- Music by: P. Shyamanna
- Release date: 1960
- Country: India
- Language: Kannada

Shivalinga Sakshi is a 1960 Indian Kannada film, directed by D. Shankar Singh and Chandra Mohan, with production handled by D. Shankar Singh. The film features Udaykumar, Prathima Devi and K. S. Ashwath in lead roles. The film has musical score by P. Shyamanna.

== Cast ==
- Udaykumar
- Prathima Devi
- K. S. Ashwath
- Balakrishna
- Arunakumari
- Lakshmi
- Ramadevi
- Subramanyam
- Srikanth
