= Honnappa Bhagavathar =

Indian actor, singer and composer (1915–1992)

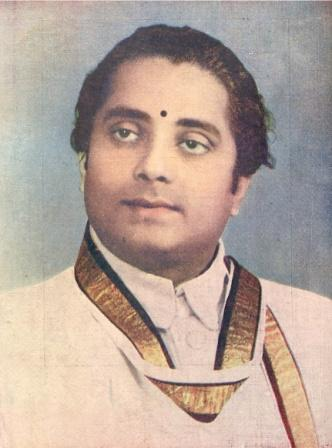
- Bhagavathar in 1948
- Born: 14 January 1915; Chowdasandra, Nelamangala, Bangalore, British India
- Died: 2 October 1992 (aged 77); Karnataka, India
- Occupations: Actor, singer, producer, musician, stage artist
- Years active: 1935–1992
- Children: 7

Chowdasandra Honnappa Bhagavathar (14 January 1915 – 2 October 1992; Kannada: ಹೊನ್ನಪ್ಪ ಭಾಗವತರು) was an Indian theatre and film actor, producer, musician and singer. He was best known as a singer and as one of the pioneers of Kannada cinema. He was also active in Tamil cinema. Bhagvathar is known for bringing actress Saroja Devi into the industry. One of his children, Bharath, was an actor in Kannada films and serials.

== Early life ==
He was born in 1915 at Chowdasandra, Nelamangala to Chikkalingappa and Kallamma. He weaved for a living. At age 5 he lost his father and grew up listening to his mother's Bhajans and music. He moved to Bangalore for work, learned classical music, then accidentally he met his guru Sambandha Murthy Bhagavathar (Hari katha vidwan in three south Indian languages & also classical musician) in a relative's marriage function and became his disciple for learning classical music. He first became a pupil of his relative Murthy, then a pupil of harmonium player Arunachalappa.

Honappa staged a play in Salem and at the same time M. K. Thyagaraja Bhagavathar, who was a rising star in Tamil cinema, recommended Bhagvathar to director Ellis R. Duncan for a supporting role in his film Ambikapathi. Bhagvathar play was a success and he was honoured with the title "Bhagavathar" and was from then on credited as Honnappa Bhagavathar.

== Career ==
Bhagavathar acted in many Tamil films. Based now in Bangalore, Bhagavathar replaced M. K. Thyagaraja Bhagavathar in the 1946 movie Sri Murugan, acting alongside MGR. Both Bhagvathar and Jeevaratnam sang in the movie, with music scored by S. M. Subbaiah Naidu. Bhagvathar founded a production company named Lalithakaala Films. It produced films in Kannada and Tamil. In 1955, his film Mahakavi Kaalidasa was the first in the Kannada language. He produced Uzhavukkum Thozhilukkum Vandhanai Seivom, a Tamil-language film that was released in 1959.

He made his Kannada acting debut in the FILM Subadra. Bhagvathar is known for bringing actresses like B. Saroja Devi into the industry. In the film Valmiki, Bhagvathar replaced M. K. Thyagaraja Bhagavathar as Valmiki, the sinner-turned-sage. Bhagvathar became a star after M. K. Thyagaraja Bhagavathar's temporary exit, playing the lead role in many Tamil movies and later in Kannada. He played the bandit-turned-sage. He also played the lead role in Mahakavi Kalidasa, which is regarded as a classic in Kannada cinema. At the 3rd National Film Awards, the film won the award for Best Feature Film in Kannada.

In 1960, Bhagavathar started the music school "Nadabrahma Sangeetha Vidyalaya". He became a member of the Kannada Film Advisory Board and worked as a member of Karnataka Sangeeta Nruthya Academy.

DVD Cover of: Jagajyothi Basaveshwara. Bhagavathar acted as Basava, while Rajkumar was part of the supporting cast.

== Partial filmography ==
No	Film	Year	Director	Language	Co-star	Notes
1	Krishnakumar	1941	S. D. S. Yogi	Tamil	T. S. Rajalakshmi	Lead Actor
2	Subhadra	1941	P. Pullaiah	Kannada	Gubbi Veeranna, J. Jayamma	
3	Sathi Suganya	1942	T. R. Sundaram & P. V. Chari	Tamil	T. R. Rajakumari	Lead Actor
4	Arundhathi	1943	M. L. Tandan & T. R. Sundaram	Tamil	U. R. Jeevarathinam	Lead Actor
5	Devakanya	1943	R. Padmanaban	Tamil	U. R. Jeevarathinam	Lead Actor
6	Prabhavathi	1944	T. R. Raghunath	Tamil	T. R. Rajakumari	Lead Actor
7	Rajarajeshwari	1944	M. L. Tandon & T. R. Sundaram	Tamil	K. L. V. Vasantha	Lead Actor
8	Burma Rani	1945	T. R. Sundaram	Tamil	K. L. V. Vasantha	
9	Hemareddy Mallamma	1945	G. R. Rao & S. Soundararajan	Kannada	Gubbi Veeranna, B. Jayamma	
10	Bhakta Kalathi	1945	R. Padmanaban	Tamil	K. Thavamani Devi	Lead Actor
11	Subhathra	1946	T. R. Sundaram	Tamil	K. L. V. Vasantha	
12	Sri Murugan	1946	M. Soma Sundaram & V. S. Narayanan	Tamil	MGR as support, U. R. Jeevarathinam, K. Malathi	Lead Actor
13	Valmiki	1946	Sundarao Nadkarni	Tamil	U. R. Jeevarathinam, N. C. Vasanthakokilam, T. R. Rajakumari	Lead Actor
14	Subathra	1946	T. R. Sundaram	Tamil	K. L. V. Vasantha	Lead Actor
15	Kundalakesi	1947	Boman D. Irani	Tamil	N. C. Vasanthakokilam	Lead Actor
16	Bhaktha Jana	1948	P. Pullaiah	Tamil	V. Nagayya, Santha Kumari	
17	Gokuladasi	1948	K. Subramaniam	Tamil	M. V. Rajamma	
18	Bhakta Kumbara	1948	Boman D. Irani	Kannada	Pandaribai	Lead Actor & Producer
19	Deva Manohari	1949	A. T. Krishnaswamy	Tamil	P. Bhanumathi	Lead Actor
20	Sathya Sodhanai	1953	H. L. N. Simha	Tamil	Pandaribai	Lead Actor
21	Gunasagari	1953	H. L. N. Simha	Kannada	Pandaribai	Lead Actor
22	Mahakavi Kalidasa	1955	K. R. Seetharama Sastry	Kannada	B. Saroja Devi (Introduced)	Actor, Producer & Music Director
23	Aashadaboothi	1955	D. Shankar Singh	Kannada	B. Saroja Devi	
24	Pancharathna	1956	K. Vembu	Kannada	Udaya Kumar, T. N. Balakrishna	Actor & Music Director
25	Jagajyothi Basveshwara	1959	T. V. Singh Thagore	Kannada	Rajkumar, B. Saroja Devi	
26	Uzhavukkum Thozhilukkum Vandhanai Seivom	1959	M. A. Thirumugam	Tamil	Prem Nazir, E. V. Saroja	Producer, With M. Karunanidhi in a Role
27	Katari Veera	1966	Y. R. Swamy	Kannada	Udaya Kumar	
28	Sadananda	1979	Ananth Hiregowder	Kannada		Actor & Producer

== Awards ==
- Mahakavi Kalidasa and Jagajyothi Basveshwara received National Awards in 1955 and 1959 respectively.
- In 1956, the Madras Sina Pyans Associations awarded him 'Best Actor'.
- In 1976, he was conferred the title "Gana Kalabhushana".
- In 1978, Scholars of Mysore state conferred the title 'Gaanakalaa Gandharva' on him.
- In 1986, he was awarded the 'Rajyothsava Award'.
- In 1990, he was awarded the 'Sangeet Natak Academy Award' by the President of India.
- In 1991, the Center for Music Drama Academy awarded him for his contribution to music. Also awarded for his stage music in this year.
