= Kalaavida =

- Directed by: Krishnan; Suryanarayana
- Produced by: B. Sohanlal
- Starring: B. Sohanlal; Kantha; Shantha
- Music by: P. Kalinga Rao
- Production company: Sohanlal Viswakalasthan Ltd.
- Release date: 1949
- Country: India
- Language: Kannada

Kalaavida is a 1949 Indian Kannada film, directed by and Krishnan and Suryanarayana. Produced by and starring B. Sohanlal in the lead role, it also stars Khantha and Shantha as parallel leads. The film had musical score by P. Kalinga Rao.

== Cast ==
- B. Sohanlal
- Khantha
- Shantha
