= Prathima Devi (Kannada actress) =

Indian actress (1933–2021)

- Born: Mohini; 9 April 1933; Kalladka, Madras Presidency, British India (today in Karnataka, India)
- Died: 6 April 2021 (aged 87); Mysore, Karnataka, India
- Occupation: Actress
- Years active: 1947–2005
- Spouse: D. Shankar Singh
- Children: 4, including Rajendra Singh Babu, Vijayalakshmi Singh

Prathima Devi (9 April 1933 – 6 April 2021) was an Indian actress known for her work in Kannada films. Devi made her debut through the 1947 film Krishnaleela. She starred in the lead role in Jaganmohini (1951), the first Kannada film to complete 100 days at the box office. She went on to appear in over 60 films.

== Biography ==
Devi was born as Mohini on 9 April 1933 in Kalladka, a town in the erstwhile South Canara region of Madras Presidency (in present-day Karnataka), to Upendra Shenoy and Saraswatibai, as the youngest of their four children. Devi lost her father when she was four or five years old; the family moved to Mangalore, then to Ahmedabad, where her brother-in-law ran a textile business, before settling in Udupi. It was here that Devi got hooked to watching films, with the role of M. S. Subbulakshmi as Naradar in the 1941 Tamil film Savithiri influencing her deeply in pursuing a career in acting.

Devi joined professional theatre at the age of 11 before her film debut with Krishnaleela (1947). She shared screen with Kemparaj Urs in the 1947 film, while also meeting her future husband D. Shankar Singh on its sets. She went on to appear in Jaganmohini (1951), which became the first Kannada film to complete a 100-day run at the theatres. Her Dallali (1952) alongside Makeup Subbanna was another major success. Most films she appeared in where produced by her husband under the banner Mahatma Films.

Devi had four children: sons Rajendra Singh Babu, who is a film director, Sangram Singh and Jairaj Singh and daughter Vijayalakshmi Singh, an actress and producer. Devi died on 6 April 2021 at her residence in Saraswatipura, Mysore, three days before her 88th birthday.

== Filmography ==
1. Krishnaleela (1947)...Gopi
2. Nagakannika (1949)
3. Shiva Parvathi (1950)
4. Jaganmohini (1951)
5. Sri Srinivasa Kalyana (1952)
6. Dallali (1952)
7. Chanchala Kumari (1953)
8. Muttidella Chinna (1954)
9. Madiddunnu Maharaya (1954)
10. Shivasharane Nambekka (1955)
11. Prabhulinga Leele (1957)
12. Mangala Sutra (1959)
13. Shivalinga Sakshi (1960)
14. Raja Satyavrata (1961)
15. Bhakta Chetha (1961)...Gowri
16. Sri Dharmasthala Mahathme (1962)
17. Paalige Bandadde Panchamrutha (1963)
18. Pathala Mohini (1965)
19. Nagarahavu (1972)
20. Nagakanye (1975)
21. Narada Vijaya (1980)
22. Bhaari Bharjari Bete (1981)...Ganga
23. Tony...Savitri (cameo)
24. Dharani Mandala Madhyadolage (1983)...Manohar's mother
25. Rama Shama Bhama (2005)

== Awards ==
- 2001–02: Dr. Rajkumar Award by the Government of Karnataka
