= Mahakavi Kalidasa =

- Poster
- Directed by: K. R. Seetharama Sastry
- Screenplay by: K. R. Seetharam Shastry
- Produced by: Honnappa Bhagavathar
- Starring: Honnappa Bhagavatar; B. Saroja Devi; B. Raghavendra Rao; Narasimharaju
- Cinematography: A. N. Paramesh
- Edited by: P. L. A. Narayan
- Music by: K. R. Seetharama Sastry; Background score: CS Sarojinidevi Lalithakala Vadya Goshti
- Production company: Lalithakala Films Ltd.
- Release date: 1955
- Running time: 140 minutes
- Country: India
- Language: Kannada

Mahakavi Kalidasa is 1955 Indian Kannada-language film directed by K. R. Seetharama Sastry, in his debut direction. The movie is based on the legends of the poet Kālidāsa. It stars Honnappa Bhagavatar as Kālidāsa, a Sanskrit poet who lived during the 4th and 5th centuries CE and B. Saroja Devi (in her film debut) .It tells the story of how he, an aristocratic young man cursed by his guru with ignorance, goes on to become a great poet. B. Raghavendra Rao, Narasimharaju features supporting roles.

K R Seetarama Sastry wrote the screenplay, dialogues and the lyrics. He scored the music too.

It was remade in Telugu in 1960 as Mahakavi Kalidasu starring Akkineni Nageswara Rao in Tamil in 1966 as Mahakavi Kalidas starring Sivaji Ganesan. This Kannada film was dubbed into Tamil and released in 1956 as Mahakavi Kalidas. At the 3rd National Film Awards, the film won the award for Best Feature Film in Kannada. The film is seen as a landmark in Kannada cinema.

== Cast ==
- Honnappa Bhagavatar as Kalidasa
- B. Saroja Devi as Vidyadhare
- B. Raghavendra Rao
- Narasimharaju
- Rajasulochana
- B. K. Eshwarappa
- M. N. Lakshmi Devi as Kaali Maathe

== Awards ==
3rd National Film Awards

- National Film Award for Best Feature Film in Kannada - Certificate of Merit
