= Mana Mecchida Madadi =

- Directed by: K. R. Seetharama Sastry
- Written by: K. R. Seetharama Sastry
- Produced by: N. B. Vathsalan; N. Ramachandra
- Starring: Rajkumar; Udaykumar; K. S. Ashwath; Balakrishna
- Cinematography: Babulnath
- Edited by: Bal G. Yadav; M. Thathaiah
- Music by: Vijaya Bhaskar
- Production company: Sarvamangala Chithra
- Distributed by: Sarvamangala Chithra
- Release date: 17 August 1963
- Country: India
- Language: Kannada

Mana Mecchida Madadi (transl. An appreciated wife) is a 1963 Indian Kannada-language film, directed by K. R. Seetharama Sastry and produced by N. B. Vathsalan and N. Ramachandra. The film stars Rajkumar, Udaykumar, K. S. Ashwath and Balakrishna, with music composed by Vijaya Bhaskar. The movie was remade in Telugu in 1965 as Visala Hrudayalu and veetu mappillai in tamil.

== Plot ==
Shrinath, an innocent young man, is raised in a village by his grandfather, unaware of his father's identity. His grandfather sends him to the city to stay with the wealthy Devarajayya and complete his higher education. There, Shrinath meets Sumana, Devarajayya's daughter, and the two gradually fall in love, much to the disapproval of Sumana's parents and Shrinath's grandfather.

To prevent their marriage, Sumana's father arranges for her to marry Ramesh, the son of his friend Umakanth. Ramesh, who pretends to be a doctor, fails his exams, exposing his deceit. To avoid the marriage, Sumana falsely claims that she is pregnant with Shrinath's child. Reluctantly her parents agree to their marriage, but the truth is revealed shortly afterward. Angered by Sumana's action her parents sever all ties with her.

The newly wed couple moves to Shrinath's village, where his grandfather initially rejects them but later accepts them before dying shortly after. struggling to find stable work, Shrinath starts a small business growing and selling vegetables. Sumana becomes pregnant and later gives birth to a son.

Facing financial hardships, the couple experiences humiliation at Sumana's sister Leela's wedding. In response, Shrinath challenges Sumana’s family, vowing that they will never visit them until he earns one lakh rupees. Due to the fact that Umakanth had helped Shrinath on a few occasions, Srikanth agrees to let Umakanth stay with them after Umakanth has an argument with his wife. Umakanth discovers that Shrinath is his own son, but decides to keep this fact a secret.

Amid these tensions, Sumana’s mother, Girija, falls seriously ill and is bedridden. The doctor advises Sumana to visit her mother, but Sumana hesitates, still feeling the weight of the humiliation her husband has faced. Eventually, the truth about Shrinath’s father is revealed. Shrinath manages to earn one lakh rupees, and Sumana’s mother recovers. In the end, Sumana’s father and sister reconcile with her, realizing that love is more important than material wealth.

== Cast ==
- Dr. Rajkumar as Srinath
- Udaykumar as Devarajayya
- K. S. Ashwath as Umakanth, Srinath's father
- Balakrishna as Ramesh
- Narasimharaju as Srinath's friend
- Eshwarappa
- Kuppuraj
- Shivaji
- Bhujanga Rao
- Basappa
- Hanumantha Rao
- Y. R. Ashwath Narayan
- Leelavathi as Sumana, Srinath's wife
- M. Jayashree as Girija
- Indiradevi
- R. T. Rama
- Revathidevi
- B. Jaya
- Prabha

== Soundtrack ==
The music was composed by Vijaya Bhaskar.

| No. | Song | Singers | Lyrics | Length (m:ss) |
|---|---|---|---|---|
| 1 | "Love Love Andarenu" | P. B. Srinivas, K. Jamuna Rani | K. R. Seetharama Sastry | 02:49 |
| 2 | "Sirithana Beke" | S. Janaki | K. R. Seetharama Sastry | 02:55 |
| 3 | "Yesu Nadigala Daati" | L. R. Eswari, P. B. Srinivas, Bangalore Latha | K. R. Seetharama Sastry | 03:19 |
| 4 | "Tutiya Mele" | P. Susheela, P. B. Srinivas | K. R. Seetharama Sastry | 03:20 |
| 5 | "Jai Bharata Jananiya" | P. B. Srinivas | Kuvempu | 03:31 |
