= Dharani Mandala Madhyadolage =

- Directed by: Puttanna Kanagal
- Screenplay by: Puttanna Kanagal
- Story by: Puttanna Kanagal
- Produced by: Varghese; Kamalakar; S. M. Narasimha Murthy; Geetha Srinath; Puttanna Kanagal
- Starring: Srinath; Jai Jagadish; Vijayalakshmi Singh
- Cinematography: B. S. Basavaraj
- Edited by: V. P. Krishna
- Music by: Vijaya Bhaskar
- Production company: Mithravrunda Movies
- Release date: 1983
- Country: India
- Language: Kannada

Dharani Mandala Madhyadolage ( transl. At the Centre of the Earth) is a 1983 Indian Kannada-language drama film written and directed by Puttanna Kanagal, starring Srinath, Jai Jagadish, Vijayalakshmi Singh, Cudavalli Chandrashekar, Padma Vasanthi, Rekha Rao and T. N. Seetharam.

== Plot ==
Manohar Nayak, Palegar, and B. L. Dalavayi are wealthy young men who spend their days harassing women and squandering money. After insulting and beating a friend, they provoke a strong-willed woman named Neela, who forces them to live and work on a dam project with only minimal cash. Initially resentful, the three adapt to their hard new life, form genuine bonds with their fellow workers, and regret their old ways.

Their past catches up with them when Purushottham, a former victim, arrives as the project engineer and exposes their misdeeds. Tensions escalate—Dalavayi’s wealthy parents reject his new love, Roopli, and Palegar deceives a blind woman, Belli. Reconciliation begins as each man vows to do right by the women they’ve wronged. But returning home brings more tragedy: Dalavayi kills his parents in a rage, and Palegar dies in an accident, leaving Nayak to think about cruel realities of society.

== Cast ==
- Srinath as Manohar Nayak
- Cudavalli Chandrashekar as Palegar
- Jai Jagadish as Dalavayi
- Vijayalakshmi Singh as Neela
- T. N. Seetharam as Purushottham
- Padma Vasanthi as Parvati
- Rekha Rao as Roopli
- Rajanand as Ramappa Dalavayi
- G. V. Hiremath
- B. Thimmayya as Shivappa Nayak
- M. S. Karanth as Manohar's brother
- Chandrahasa Alva
- Umesh Hegde
- Bharath Bhagavathar as Palegar's brother
- Malur Siddappa
- Pranava Murthy
- Prathima Devi as Manohar's mother
- Srinivasa Murthy in a cameo in song "Kaligalavayya Kaligala"
- Gudugeri Basavaraj in a cameo
- Kalpanarani
- Thriveni Kanagal
- Ramu Kanagal
- Puttanna Kanagal in a cameo (uncredited)

== Soundtrack ==
The music was composed by Vijaya Bhaskar, with lyrics by Vijayanarasimha and Siddalingaiah.

Track listing
No.	Title	Lyrics	Singer(s)	Length
1.	"Kanasanu Beesi Olavina Baleyanu"	Siddalingaiah	Vani Jairam
2.	"Uyyale Aadona Banniro"	Vijaya Narasimha	P. Jayachandran, Vani Jairam
3.	"Gelathi O Gelathi"	Siddalingaiah	S. P. Balasubrahmanyam
4.	"Kaligalavayya Kaligala"	Siddalingaiah	S. P. Balasubrahmanyam
