= Nala Damayanthi (1957 film) =

- Poster of the 1959 Tamil dub
- Directed by: Kemparaj Urs
- Story by: Samudrala Jr.
- Dialogues by: Samudrala Jr. (Telugu); B C Srinivas (Kannada)
- Based on: Mahabharata
- Produced by: Kemparaj Urs
- Starring: Kemparaj Urs; P. Bhanumathi
- Cinematography: B. D. Mathur
- Edited by: V. S. Narayana; P. Kandasamy
- Music by: B. Gopalam
- Production company: Kemparaj Urs Productions
- Release date: 1957
- Country: India
- Languages: Kannada; Telugu

Nala Damayanthi is a 1957 Indian film simultaneously shot in Kannada and Telugu. It was produced and directed by Kemparaj Urs. The film stars him and P. Bhanumathi. The film was dubbed and released in 1959 in Tamil.

== Plot ==
The film is based on a story from the Vana Parva of Mahabharata. Damayanthi is the princess of Vidarbha Kingdom and Nala is the king of Nishadha Kingdom. He is an excellent cook. They love and marry each other and beget two children. But soon they undergo hardships due to Nala losing his kingdom in a game of dice. They get separated but Damayanthi is found and joins her father with her two children. Nala is bitten by a snake and becomes a dwarf. Damayanthi arranges for a fake swayamwara to find her husband. Nala, as a dwarf, attends the ceremony with his master. Damayanthi recognizes him from the food he prepared. Nala is restored to his former self and the couple are reunited.

== Cast ==
- Kemparaj Urs as Nala
- P. Bhanumathi as Damayanthi
- M. A. Ganapathi Bhat (Kannada)
- Narasimha Raju (Kannada)
- V. Nagayya (Telugu)
- Relangi (Telugu)
- Mukkamala
- Jayalakshmi
- Annapoornamma (Kannada)
- Kameswaramma
- B. Ramadevi
- Seetha
- Lankasathiyam
- Sri Vathsa
- Venkara
- Lakshmaiya Chowdri

== Soundtrack ==
Music was composed by B. Gopalam. Kannada lyrics are written by Hunsur Krishnamurthy and Indirathanaya while Telugu lyrics are written by Samudrala Jr.

Telugu

Song	Singer(s)
Arubhumapadhambu Taraṇimīrina Bhogi Vantalavadaguchu"	Madhavapeddi
"Adiren Na Kudikannu Na kuḍi Bhujambhu Atyanta"	P. Bhanumathi
"Ativa Dapaganela Nan Valachi Nikatyanta Santapa Dusdhiti"	Ghantasala

Tamil dubbed

Song	Singer(s)	Lyricist	Duration(m:ss)
"Sarasam Seiyadhe Maname"	P. Bhanumathi	Puratchidasan	02:53
"Anname Thaen Piraiyaale"	P. B. Srinivas	Puratchidasan	01:25
"Jai Bavani Dhayaarpari"	P. Bhanumathi	Puratchidasan	00:55
"Ilanthalir Neeraadum Then Suvai"	A. P. Komala	Puratchidasan	03:20
"Nan Konda Koyil Endha"	P. Bhanumathi	Puratchidasan	03:14
"Nin Paadha Dhaasi"	P. Bhanumathi	Puratchidasan	03:41
"Karunaabharaney"	B. Gopalam	Samudrala	01:26
"Vinaip Payan Idhuthaanaa"	B. Gopalam	Kuyilan	02:36
"Singara Dhamayanthi Seemandham"	A. P. Komala	Kuyilan	03:31
"Thee Vinayo Nenjam Mariyadho"	P. Bhanumathi	Kuyilan	03:39
"Amma Puviyaalum Mathaa"	P. Bhanumathi	Kuyilan	03:37
"Varunaadhi Devane"	B. Gopalam	Kuyilan	02:39
"Seena Seeyanna Sirichaa"	S. Janaki	Kuyilan	03:06
"Prabho Yae Prabho"	P. B. Srinivas	Kuyilan	02:15
"Thappi Pottu Thappu"	B. Gopalam, K. Rani	M. Sundharan	03:34
"Mali Pugazh Nala Saridhai"	Seerkazhi Govindarajan	Papanasam Sivan	02:22

== Release ==
The film was a box office failure. The Telugu version of the film was dubbed in Tamil in 1959 under the same title with dialogues by Aaroor Dass. P. Bhanumathi dubbed for herself.
