= Mahasadhvi Mallamma =

- VCD cover
- Directed by: Renuka Sharma
- Written by: Goturi (dialogues)
- Screenplay by: Renuka Sharma
- Story by: Renuka Sharma
- Produced by: A. Sanjeev Kumar; N. S. Eliwala; N. S. Jayawadagi
- Starring: Meena; Rajendra Prasad; P. Sai Kumar
- Cinematography: V. K. Kannan
- Edited by: S. Manohar
- Music by: Srishaila
- Production company: N. S. Productions
- Release date: 14 January 2005
- Running time: 172 minutes
- Country: India
- Language: Kannada

Mahasadhvi Mallamma is a 2005 Indian Kannada-language biographical film, based on the life of Hemareddy Mallamma, produced by A. Sanjeev Kumar, N. S. Eliwala, N. S. Jayawadagi on N. S. Productions banner and directed by Renuka Sharma. Starring Meena in the title role alongside Rajendra Prasad, and Saikumar and music composed by Srishaila.

== Cast ==
- Meena as Mallamma
- Rajendra Prasad as Barama Reddy
- P. Sai Kumar
- Sridhar as Shiva
- Anantha Velu
- Krishne Gowda
- B. K. Shankar
- Tharika
- Anuradha Sridhar
- Pramila Joshai
- Anitha Rani
- Srilalitha

== Production ==
Deccan Herald reported in July 2003 that Mahasadhvi Mallamma was under production. It was the third film made on Mallamma after Hemareddy Mallamma (1946) and another film of the same released in 1973. It was reported that Renuka Sharma was directing the film produced by A. Sanjeev Kumar, N. S. Yeliwala and N. S. Jayawadagi.

== Soundtrack ==
Mahasadhvi Mallamma

Film score by Srishaila
- Released: 13 December 2004
- Genre: Soundtrack
- Length: 37:14
- Label: Ashwini Audio
- Producer: Srishaila

Music composed by Srishaila. Music released on Ashwini Audio Company.

No.	Title	Lyrics	Singer(s)	Length
1.	"Om Shrishailavasaya"	Gotori	Chitra	2:15
2.	"Hethorge"	Doddarangegowda	Sangeetha Katti	4:41
3.	"Sharanembenu"	Bharath Gowda	Chitra	4:41
4.	"Yaa Devi"	Gotori	Madhu Balakrishnan	3:39
5.	"Navarasa Natya"	Srichandra	Chitra, B.Prasath	4:28
6.	"Yakamma"	V. Nagendra Prasad	M.D.Pallavi	4:35
7.	"Panjaradali Bidde"	Gotori	Madhu Balakrishnan	1:55
8.	"Hey Parameshwara"	Gotori	Nanditha	5:07
9.	"Jaya Jaya Mahadeva"	Gotori	Madhu Balakrishnan	2:06
10.	"Hasugalanda Bere"	Gotori	Madhu Balakrishnan	1:07
11.	"Pasabandhadinda"	Gotori	Madhu Balakrishnan	1:10
12.	"Thamma Anna Mayi"	Gotori	Madhu Balakrishnan	1:30
Total length:				37:14
