= B. Jayamma =

Indian actress

- Jayamma in 1947
- Born: 15 November 1915; Bangalore, Kingdom of Mysore
- Died: 20 December 1988 (aged 73); Bangalore, Karnataka, India
- Other name: Gubbi Jayamma
- Occupations: Actress; dramatist; singer; politician
- Spouse: Gubbi Veeranna (m. 1931; died 1972)
- Children: 3

Member of the Karnataka Legislative Council
- In office 1980–1986

B. Jayamma (15 November 1915 – 20 December 1988) was an Indian actress and singer. She began her career on stage as a 14-year-old when she joined a theatre group owned by Gubbi Veeranna, her future husband. She went on to perform for 45 years on stage while also appearing in 45 Kannada, Telugu and Tamil films.

== Career ==
Jayamma's first acting role in films came in 1931 in Raphael Algoet's directorial, His Love Affair. She starred as the lead in the silent film opposite Gubbi Veeranna, who also produced the film. Jayamma started in many silent films before appearing in talkies. A popular actor in the 1930s and 1940s, she featured in many films alongside her husband. In the Telugu film Swarga Seema (1945), she played Kalyani, a neglected homemaker. She played the role of Hemareddy Mallamma in the Kannada film Hemareddy Mallamma (1946) that dealt with the hardships faced by her character. Jayamma often playback-sang for her films too.

== Filmography ==
Year	Film	Role	Language	Notes	Ref.
1931	His Love Affair			Silent film	
1932	Hari Maya			Silent film	
1935	Sadarame	Draupadi	Kannada		
1938	Gul-E-Bakawali		Punjabi		
1941	Subhadra		Kannada		
1942	Jeevana Nataka	Padma	Kannada		
1944	Barthruhari	Pingala	Tamil		
1945	Hemareddy Mallamma	Mallamma	Kannada		
1945	Swarga Seema	Kalyani	Telugu		
1946	Lavangi	Mumtaz Mahal	Tamil		
1946	Thyagaiah	Dharmamba	Telugu	Credited as Gubbi Jayamma	
1947	Brahma Ratham		Telugu		
1949	Natyarani		Tamil		
1949	Mangayarkarasi		Tamil		
1950	Raja Vikrama	Prabhavathi	Tamil		
1951	Mantra Dandam	Yogini	Telugu		
1953	Gunasagari	Gangavva	Kannada		
1953	Naa Illu		Telugu		
1953	Gumastha	Seetha	Tamil		
1954	Karkottai		Tamil		
1958	Anna Thangi		Kannada		
1965	Balarajana Kathe		Kannada		
1965	Mavana Magalu		Kannada		
1966	Premamayi		Kannada		
1967	Immadi Pulikeshi	Pulikeshi's grandmother	Kannada		
1968	Anna Thamma		Kannada		
1968	Bedi Bandavalu		Kannada		
1970	Mukti	Sarojini's mother	Kannada		
1970	Nanna Thamma		Kannada	Cameo	
1971	Sakshatkara	Thaayamma	Kannada		
1977	Punarmilana		Kannada		
1980	Mithuna		Kannada	Special appearance	
2006	Saavira Mettilu		Kannada	Special appearance Posthumous release	

== Discography ==
Year	Track	Album	Ref(s)
1942	"Suma Maale"	Jeevana Nataka	
1942	"Meenanka Roopana"	Jeevana Nataka	
1944	"Neere Neere Maaran"	Barthruhari	
1944	"Umaiyodu"	Barthruhari	
1945	"Mallikaarjuna Paalisu"	Hemareddy Mallamma	
1945	"Shubhadathe Gomaathe"	Hemareddy Mallamma	
1945	"Chalo Chalo Cycle"	Swarga Seema	
1945	"Grihame Kada Swarga Seema"	Swarga Seema	
1945	"Jo Achutananda Jojo Mukunda"	Swarga Seema	
1945	"Rara Radha Manoramana"	Swarga Seema	
1946	"Neel Kanjavizhik"	Lavangi	
1946	"Aa Aa Paaduvom Ellorum"	Lavangi	
1946	"Aha Inre Peranantam"	Lavangi	
1946	"Aaragimpave"	Thyagaiah	
1946	"Ennadu Sevincha Ledhu"	Thyagaiah	
1946	"Ennagu Manasuku Raani"	Thyagaiah	
1946	"Jo Jo Sri Rama"	Thyagaiah	
1946	"Raare Raare Pillalara"	Thyagaiah	
1946	"Sri Kalyana Gunaathmaka Ram"	Thyagaiah	
1946	"Sri Seetha Rama Kalyanam"	Thyagaiah	
1946	"Srikaram Bainatti"	Thyagaiah	
1953	"Aadhari Jegadheeswari Amba"	Gumastha	
1953	"Theeradha Varumaiyudan"	Gumastha	

== Bibliography ==
- Rajadhyaksha, Ashish; Willemen, Paul (1998) [1994]. Encyclopaedia of Indian Cinema. Oxford University Press. ISBN 0-19-563579-5.
