= Shanta Hublikar =

Indian actress, singer

- Born: Rajamma; 14 April 1914; Adargunchi, Hubballi Karnataka, India
- Died: 17 July 1992 (aged 78); Pune, Maharashtra
- Occupations: actress; singer
- Years active: 1934–1963
- Spouse: Bapusaheb Gite (m. 1939; died 1977)
- Children: 1

Shanta Hublikar (14 April 1914 – 17 July 1992), was an actress and singer from early years of Indian cinema. Shanta worked in Marathi, Hindi and Kannada films from 1934 to 1963. Her songs Ab kis liye kalki baat from Aadmi and its Marathi version Kashala udyachi baat from Manoos became immensely popular and established her as a star actress of her time.

== Personal life ==
Hublikar in 1939

Born as Rajamma in Adargunchi, a village in Hubballi in Karnataka, Shanta came to Kolhapur to work in films when she was 18.

Shanta married to Bapusahep Gite, a business man from Poona (now Pune) in 1939. She was fluent in Kannada, Marathi and Hindi.

== Career ==
In 1934, she first did a minor role in the film Bhedi Rajkumar/Thaksen Rajputra. Her first major role was in Kanhopatra (1937). Soon she was hired by Prabhat Film Company and cast her in Marthi-Hindi bilingual Majha Mulga/Mera Ladka in 1938 Shanta impressed V. Shantaram by her singing and acting which led to cast her in his path-breaking movie Aadmi/Manoos in Hindi and Marathi respectively. Shanta played the role of a prostitute which was a bold step in those days. Shanta became popular as a singer too.

After Aadmi's success, Shanta went on to appear in many movies including her only Kannada film Jeevana Nataka in 1942.

== Autobiography ==
Shanta has written an autobiography in Marathi, "Kashala Udyachi Baat" published by Srividya Publications.

== Book in Kannada ==
Noted writer A.N.Prahlada Rao, has written a book 'Shanta Hublikar' in Kannada, published by Rashtrottahana Parishat.

== Death ==
After husband's death in 1977, Shanta became alone, spent her last days in an old age home in Pune and died on 17 July 1992.

She had also lived in Shraddhanand Mahila Ashram Vasai west in the late 1980s.

== Filmography ==
Films of Shanta Hublikar.

- Bhedka Rajkumar (1934)
- Kanhopatra (1937)
- Mera Ladka (1937)
- Manoos/Aadmi (1939)
- Ghar Ki Laaj (1941)
- Pahila Palna (1942)
- Jeevana Nataka (1942)
- Malan (1942)
- Kul Kalank (1945)
- Jeevan Chaya (1946)
- Sowbhagyavathi Bhavh (1958)
- Ghar Grihasthi (1958)
- Holiday in Bombay (1963)
