= Bhakta Kumbara (1949 film) =

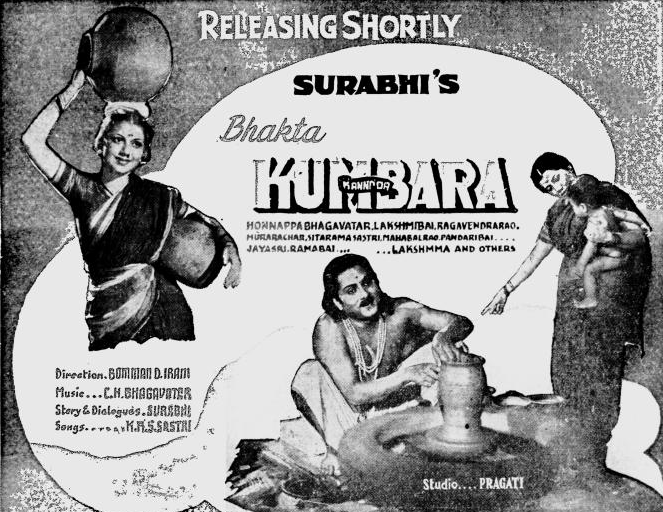
- Theatrical release poster
- Directed by: Bomman D. Irani
- Produced by: Honnappa Bhagavathar
- Starring: Honnappa Bhagavathar; Lakshmi Bai; Vimalananda das Pandari Bai
- Music by: Honnappa Bhagavathar
- Production company: Pragati
- Release date: 1949
- Country: India
- Language: Kannada

Bhakta Kumbara is a 1949 Indian Kannada film, directed by Bomman D. Irani and produced by Honnappa Bhagavathar. Bhagavathar also appears in the lead role alongside M. Jayashree, Lakshmi Bai, Vimalananda Das and Pandari Bai.

== Cast ==
- Honnappa Bhagavathar
- Lakshmi Bai
- Vimalananda das
- Pandari Bai
- Murarachar
- Seetarama Sastri
- Mahabala Rao
- M. Jayashree
- Ramabai
- Lakshmamma
