= Karkottai =

- Poster
- Directed by: Kemparaj Urs
- Screenplay by: V. Gopalan; S. R. Krishna Ayyangar
- Based on: The Count of Monte Cristo by Alexandre Dumas
- Produced by: Kemparaj Urs
- Starring: Kemparaj Urs; K. Sarangapani; Krishna Kumari; B. R. Panthulu
- Cinematography: Madhur
- Edited by: Paul, G. Yadav
- Music by: S. V. Venkatraman; G. Ramanathan
- Production company: Kemparaj Productions
- Distributed by: Ramanathan Pictures
- Release date: 12 March 1954
- Country: India
- Languages: Tamil; Kannada

Karkottai (transl. Rock Fort) is a 1954 Indian Tamil-language historical adventure film produced and directed by Kemparaj Urs. The film stars himself and Krishna Kumari. It is based on the 1844 novel The Count of Monte Cristo by Alexandre Dumas. The film was released on 12 March 1954.

== Cast ==
- Kemparaj Urs
- Krishna Kumari
- K. Sarangapani
- B. R. Panthulu
- M. V. Rajamma
- Jayalakshmi
- Sandhya
- B. Jayamma

== Production ==
Karkottai was based on The Count of Monte Cristo by Alexandre Dumas. It was simultaneously produced in Kannada under the title Jaladurga.

== Soundtrack ==
Music was composed by S. V. Venkatraman and G. Ramanathan while the lyrics were penned by Srimathi Rajeswary.

Track listing
| No. | Title | Length |
|---|---|---|
| 1. | "O! Kappalottu Thamizhaa" |
| 2. | "Naan Ingu Thaniyaaga, Nee Angu Thaniyaaga" |
| 3. | "Inbamaa, Nee Thunbamaa" |
| 4. | "Kovilukku Odiduvaar Govinda" |
| 5. | "Avan Seyyum Leelaikku" |

== Bibliography ==
- Rajadhyaksha, Ashish; Willemen, Paul (1998) [1994]. Encyclopaedia of Indian Cinema. British Film Institute and Oxford University Press. ISBN 0-19-563579-5.
