= Barthruhari =

1944 film by K. Subramanyam

- Theatrical release poster
- Directed by: K. Subrahmanyam; C. S. V. Iyer
- Screenplay by: Krishnaswami Subrahmanyam
- Produced by: K. Subrahmanyam
- Starring: Serukalathur Sama; B. Jayamma
- Cinematography: C.V. Ramakrishnan
- Music by: V. S. Parthasarathy Iyengar
- Production companies: Kalaivani Films; Madras United Artistes Corporation
- Distributed by: SIP
- Release date: 13 April 1944
- Country: India
- Language: Tamil

Barthruhari is a 1944 Indian Tamil language historical drama film produced by K. Subrahmanyam, who co-directed it with C. S. V. Iyer. The film stars Serukalathur Sama and B. Jayamma, with G. Pattu Iyer, N. S. Krishnan, V. N. Janaki and T. A. Mathuram in supporting roles. Based on the life of the king Bharthari, it was released on 13 April 1944 and failed commercially.

== Plot ==
Barthruhari is married to 300 women. He spends most of his time with his youngest and most favourite wife, Pingala. The chief groom of the king's horses, Aswapaalan resorts to thievery to satisfy the needs of his mistress, Sundari. The people who were robbed complain to the king, who decides to find the culprit and punish him. Through sheer happenstance, Aswapaalan meets Pingala and both start an extramarital affair.

Vikramadityan, the king's brother, catches Aswapaalan one night and detains him in Pingala's palace. To escape from the situation lest her affair with Aswapaalan is discovered, Pingala complains to Barthruhari that Vikramadityan tried to seduce her, which Vikramadityan denies. The king immediately banishes Vikramadityan without looking into the matter properly. Later, the king realises that his younger brother was telling the truth when he sees Aswapaalan and Pingala together. Shocked and aggrieved, he gives up his throne, brings Vikramadityan back and crowns him as the new king. Barthruhari then becomes a hermit and retires to the forest to do penance.

== Cast ==
- Serukalathur Sama as Barthruhari
- B. Jayamma as Pingala
- G. Pattu Iyer as Vikramadityan
- N. S. Krishnan as Aswapaalan
- V. N. Janaki as Pingala's companion
- T. A. Mathuram as Sundari

== Production ==
K. Subrahmanyam co-produced the film under his own banner Madras United Artistes Corporation with Kalaivani Films. C. V. Ramakrishnan worked as the film's cinematographer. Both Nagoor and S. R. Sarma were in charge of the production design. Principal photography for the film was done at Newtone Studio.

Bharthruhari featured intimate romance sequences between Jayamma and Krishnan which, according to film critic and historian Randor Guy, "people thought was in bad taste" and that it was "certainly far ahead of the times". These scenes generated controversy for the film, Jayamma and Krishnan.

== Soundtrack ==
V. S. Parthasarathy Iyengar composed the film's music and score while Papanasam Sivan, Rajagopal Iyer and Udumalai Narayana Kavi wrote the lyrics for the songs. Jayamma and Krishnan sang a duet in the film. (Note: Guy does not mention the song's name.)

Some songs

- Neere Neere Maaran – B. Jayamma
- Umaiyodu – Serukalathur Sama, B. Jayamma

== Release and reception ==
Barthruhari was released on 13 April 1944, and was distributed by SIP. The film received neither positive critical response nor commercial success, with the intimate scenes between Jayamma and Krishnan adversely impacting its box office performance.
