= Gunasagari =

1953 film by H. L. N. Simha

- Directed by: H. L. N. Simha
- Written by: H. L. N. Simha; K. R. Seetharama Sastry (lyrics)
- Produced by: A. V. Meiyappan; Gubbi Veeranna; C. R. Basavaraju
- Starring: Gubbi Veeranna; Honnappa Bhagavathar; Pandari Bai
- Cinematography: G. K. Mehta; T. Muthuswamy
- Music by: R. Sudarshanam
- Production companies: AVM Productions; The Karnataka Films Ltd.
- Distributed by: AVM Productions; The Karnataka Films Ltd.
- Release date: 1953
- Country: India
- Language: Kannada

Gunasagari is a 1953 Indian Kannada-language film directed by H. L. N. Simha and produced by AVM Productions. It stars Gubbi Veeranna, Honnappa Bhagavathar and Pandari Bai. The music was composed by R. Sudarshanam. The film was dubbed and released in Tamil as Sathya Sodhanai. Malayalam actor Prem Nazir had a small role in this film which was his only Kannada film appearance. Rajasulochana made her debut with this film.

== Cast ==
- Gubbi Veeranna -Yogi Basalinga
- Honnappa Bhagavathar - Malla Shetty
- Pandari Bai - Gunasagari
- B. Jayamma - Gangavva
- T. S. Balaiah - Nirguna
- T. S. Kari Basayya - Muddanna
- B. Hanumanthachar - Amaru
- K. Basavaraju - Bhramaru
- Krishna Kumari - Mallakka
- Rajasulochana - Sister of Gunasagari
- C. V. V. Panthalu
- Prem Nazir

== Soundtrack ==
=== Kannada songs ===
The lyrics were written by K. R. Seetharama Sastry

| No. | Song | Singer/s |
|---|---|---|
| 1 | "Sri Guruvige Sharanu" | |
| 2 | "Hosa Varushada Harushave" | T. S. Bhagavathi |
| 3 | "Thoura Nadiyanu Thoredu" | T. S. Bhagavathi |
| 4 | "Premambharake Nee Shubhodayavu" | V.J.Varma, T.S.Bhagavathi |
| 5 | "Daari Thoro Prabho Shankara" | M.S.Rajeshwari |
| 6 | "Eliro Eliro Belagayithu" | |
| 7 | "Poorna Chandrike" | T.S.Bhagavathi |
| 8 | "Baari Baarigoo Bayasuve Cheluve" | V. J. Varma |
| 9 | "Thanu Neegalire Mani Needuvare" | T. S. Bhagavathi |
| 10 | "Chapalya Saaku Saaku Manave" | T. S. Bhagavathi |
| 11 | "Jo Jo Chinna Jo Ranna" | T. S. Bhagavathi |
| 12 | "Raviyanu Meghada Kulave Kavidaru" | V. J. Varma |

=== Tamil songs ===
The lyrics were written by Thanjai N. Ramaiah Dass, K. P. Kamatchisundaram, Ku. Ma. Balasubramaniam, V. Seetharaman and Papanasam Sivan.

| No. | Song | Singer/s | Lyricist |
|---|---|---|---|
| 1 | "Anbe Deivamada" | V. J. Varma | Thanjai N. Ramaiah Dass |
| 2 | "Muzhu Nilaa Kanniye" | T. S. Bhagavathi | Thanjai N. Ramaiah Dass |
| 3 | "Maamalarum Thaenum Sindhum" | T. S. Bhagavathi & group | K. P. Kamatchisundaram |
| 4 | "Kaanum Podhile" | Honnappa Bhagavathar | K. P. Kamatchisundaram |
| 5 | "Vaazhvenum Perungkadalile" | T. S. Bhagavathi | Ku. Ma. Balasubramaniam |
| 6 | "Puyal Veesi Oyndha Vaazhkai" | | Ku. Ma. Balasubramaniam |
| 7 | "Kaadhal Vaanil Nee Chandrodhayam" | M. S. Rajeswari | V. Seetharaman |
| 8 | "Odi Vaa Odi Vaa Velli Mulaichi" | M. S. Rajeswari | V. Seetharaman |
| 9 | "Jothi Mayamaana Umapathi" | T. S. Bhagavathi | Papanasam Sivan |
| 10 | "Aadhi Andham Illaa Jothiye" | T. S. Bhagavathi | Papanasam Sivan |
