= Shevagyachya Shenga =

1955 film

Drumsticks
- Directed by: Shantaram Athavale
- Written by: Y. G. Joshi
- Produced by: Sadashiv J. Raokavi
- Starring: Nanda
- Cinematography: Vasant Beltangdi, R. V. Durgaprasad
- Edited by: J. S. Diwadkar
- Music by: Sudhir Phadke
- Production company: Sadashiv Chitra
- Release date: 19 July 1955
- Country: India
- Language: Marathi

Drumsticks (Marathi: Shevagyachya Shenga) is a 1955 Indian film directed by Shantaram Athavale. It was entered into the 1956 Cannes Film Festival.

== Plot ==
A heartwarming family story. Kaka Saheb, a widower, is preparing for his daughter's upcoming wedding. However, after the marriages of his three sons, disputes arise among them over the division of property. This leads to separation, yet their bond with their home and respect for their late mother remains strong. In the end, their sister, Taraka, invites them all for a meal, serving pithla made with drumstick pods from their own backyard tree—a favorite of everyone. Respecting her invitation, they come together, and through this simple meal, the family reconnects once again.

== Cast ==
- Nanda as Taraka
- Chittaranjan Kolhatkar
- Vikram Gokhale as Kaka Saheb's son
- Chandrakant Gokhale as Kaka Saheb
- Balakram
- Master Chhotu
- Sumati Gupte-Joglekar

== Awards ==
- 1955 - National Film Award for Best Feature Film in Marathi - Certificate of Merit
