= Jaganmohini (1951 film) =

- Directed by: D. Shankar Singh
- Written by: Hunsur Krishnamurthy (dialogues)
- Produced by: D. Shankar Singh
- Starring: Harini; Pratima Devi; Srinivasa Rao
- Music by: P. Shyamanna
- Distributed by: Mahathma Pictures
- Release date: 9 July 1951
- Country: India
- Language: Kannada

Jaganmohini is a 1951 Kannada film by D. Shankar Singh. It is about a seductress who falls in love with a prince and tries to steal him from his fiancée. It starred Harini who made her debut at the age of 14. Harini became the first Kannada heroine to wear a swimsuit on-screen. The movie was infamous for its censor problems. It became a box-office hit and had a 100-day run - the first Kannada film to run for hundred days. The movie ran for 25 weeks and was the highest-grossing movie at that time. B. Vittalacharya remade it in Telugu in 1978 as Jaganmohini, which also went on to be remade in Tamil in 1978. Further, it was made in Tamil again in 2009 as Jaganmohini. The film was dubbed into Telugu and released in 1953.

== Cast ==
- Harini
- Srinivasa Rao
- U. Mahabala Rao
- Prathima Devi
- M. Jayashree
- M. S. Subbanna
