= Shantaram Athavale =

Indian film director and author (1910–1975)

Shantaram Govind Athavale
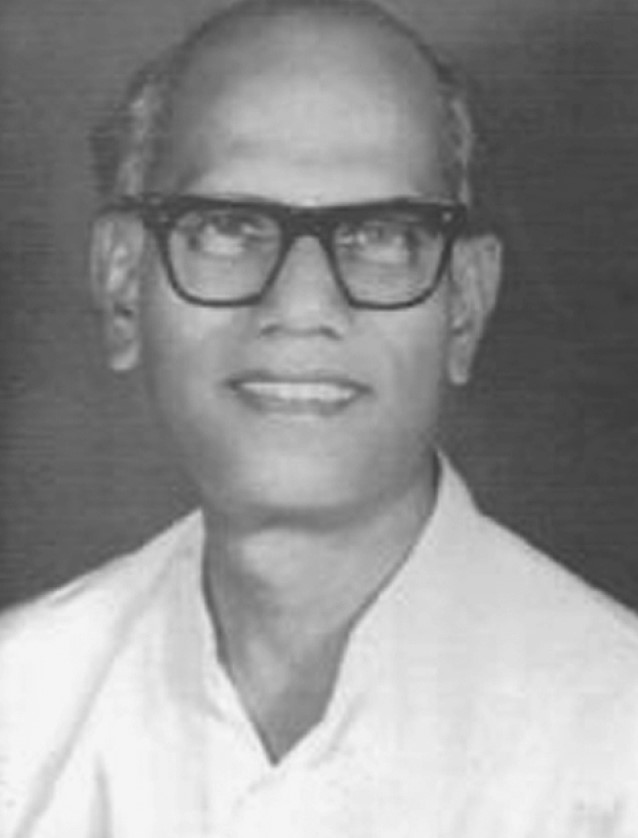
- Born: 21 January 1910; Pune, Maharashtra
- Died: 2 May 1975 (aged 65)
- Occupation: Film director
- Notable work: Shevagyachya Shenga
- Awards: Certificate of Merit; 3rd National Film Awards (1955)

Shantaram Govind Athavale (21 January 1910 – 2 May 1975) was an Indian director of Marathi, Hindi and English language films, a lyricist, poet, and author. Part of the generation that emerged from the Prabhat Film Company in Pune in the 1930s, he made pioneering contributions to Marathi film.

== Biography ==
In the early 1930s, Athavale undertook an apprenticeship with the popular novelist Narayan Hari Apte. When Apte was brought in by the Prabhat Film Company to script Amrit Manthan, Athavale joined him and achieved success as a songwriter on the film with Kiti sukhada.

At Prabhat, as a lyricist under V. Shantaram and working alongside Vishram Bedekar, Master Vinayak, Keshavrao Bhole and others, Athavale would be part of the generation considered pioneers of Marathi cinema. Athavale's contribution as lyricist to Sant Tukaram, the first Indian film to achieve critical international success, was highly regarded.

Athavale as lyricist frequently worked with Keshavrao Bhole composing music; their collaborations included Kunku (1937), Mazha Mulga and Gopal Krishna (both 1938), Sant Dnyaneshwar (1940), Sant Sakhu and Shejari (both 1941), Daha Wajta (1942) and Ramshastri (1944). During this period, he became an assistant director under V. Shantaram.

He left Prabhat Films in 1942 and contributed dialogue and lyrics for Debaki Bose's Aple Ghar and lyrics for Vijay Bhatt's Bharat Bhet.

In 1948, Athavale made his debut as a director with Bhagya Rekha, which focused on a man who is part of the independence movement and must leave his pregnant wife when forced to go underground. The film incorporated his long-term colleagues Narayan Hari Apte (script) and Keshavrao Bhole (score) with Shanta Apte acting.

He won the Certificate of Merit for Feature Films in Marathi at the 3rd National Film Awards in 1956 for directing the movie Shevagyachya Shenga. The film, under the English title Drumsticks, was entered into competition at Cannes in 1956.

In the early 1960s, Athavale switched to working in English, making a series of documentaries for the Films Division of India.

Released in 1966, Athavale's history of the Prabhat Film Company, Prabhatkal, was considered a unique and significant work.

== Filmography (as director) ==
- 1948: Bhagya Rekha (Marathi)
- 1949: Main Abla Nahin Hoon (Hindi)
- 1953: Vahininchya Bangdya (Marathi)
- 1954: Sansar Karaychay Mala (Marathi)
- 1955: Shevagyachya Shenga (Marathi)
- 1958: Padada (Marathi)
- 1960: Fix it Right (English – documentary)
- 1960: Write it Right (English – documentary)
- 1961: How to Vote (English – documentary)
- 1961: Gift of Sight (English – documentary)
- 1962: Citizens and Citizens (English – documentary)
- 1962: The Homecoming (English – documentary)
- 1962: Marriage and After (English – documentary)
- 1963: Chatur Balak (Hindi)
- 1965: Vavtal (Marathi)
- 1968: Sankat Main Swasthya Aur Safai (Hindi – documentary)
- 1971: My Village My People (English – documentary)
