= Adargunchi =

- suburb
- Location in Karnataka, India Adargunchi (India)
- Coordinates: 15.2816139°N 75.1530788°E
- Country: India
- State: Karnataka
- District: Dharwad
- Talukas: Hubli

Government
  - Type: Panchayat raj
  - Body: Gram panchayat

Population (2011)
  - Total: 7,625

Languages
  - Official: Kannada
- Time zone: UTC+5:30 (IST)
- ISO 3166 code: IN-KA
- Vehicle registration: KA
- Website: karnataka.gov.in

Adargunchi is a suburb in the southern state of Karnataka, India. It is located in the Hubli taluk of Dharwad district in Karnataka.

== Demographics ==
As of the 2011 Census of India there were 1,559 households in Adargunchi and a total population of 7,625 consisting of 3,837 males and 3,788 females. There were 967 children ages 0-6.

== Noted people ==
- Shanta Hublikar - Legendary actress in Marathi and Hindi cinema in 1940s, was born in Adargunchi village.

== See also ==
- Dharwad
- Districts of Karnataka
