= Beratha Jeeva =

- Directed by: K. R. Seetharama Sastry
- Screenplay by: Ku Ra Seetharam Shastry
- Based on: Paalum Pazhamum (Tamil) (1961)
- Produced by: K. R. Seetharama Sastry; Shivaram
- Starring: Kalyan Kumar; B. Saroja Devi; Jayanthi; K. S. Ashwath
- Cinematography: K. Janakiram
- Edited by: Bal G. Yadav
- Music by: Vijaya Bhaskar
- Production company: Viridha Bharathi
- Distributed by: Viridha Bharathi
- Release date: 23 January 1965
- Running time: 120 min
- Country: India
- Language: Kannada

Beratha Jeeva ( transl. Mixed lives) is a 1965 Indian Kannada-language film, directed by K. R. Seetharama Sastry and produced by K. R. Seetharama Sastry and Shivaram. The film stars Kalyan Kumar, B. Saroja Devi, Jayanthi and K. S. Ashwath. The movie is a remake of the 1961 Tamil movie Palum Pazhamum.

== Cast ==
- Kalyan Kumar as Dr. Rajashekhar
- B. Saroja Devi as Sudha
- Jayanthi
- K. S. Ashwath
- Shivaram
- Balakrishna
- Narasimharaju
- H. R. Shastry
- Raghavendra Rao
- Shivaraj
- M. Jayashree
- Lakshmidevi
- B. Jaya

== Soundtrack ==
The music was composed by Vijaya Bhaskar.

Song	Singers	Lyrics	Length (m:ss)
"Ankada Parade"	P. Susheela	K. R. Seetharama Sastry	03:29
"Beku Beku"	P. Susheela P.B. Srinivas	K. R. Seetharama Sastry	04:02
"Nanna Dhaatiya Neenariye"	P. Susheela P.B. Srinivas	K. R. Seetharama Sastry	
