= Kemparaj Urs =

Indian filmmaker, theatre personality

- Born: D. Kemparaj Urs; 5 February 1917; Kallahalli, Hunsur Taluk, Mysore State, British India (present-day Karnataka, India)
- Died: 18 May 1982 (aged 65)
- Occupations: Actor; producer; director
- Years active: 1942–1964
- Spouse: T. N. Lalitha
- Children: 3
- Parents: Devaraj Urs (father); Devirammanni (mother)
- Family: D. Devaraj Urs (brother)

D. Kemaparaj Urs (5 February 1917 – 18 May 1982) was an Indian freedom fighter, actor, director and producer who worked mainly in the Kannada film industry. His movies in 1940s and 1950s created an impact on the audience. Even before Dr. Rajkumar's arrival to the industry, Urs was already an established star. His elder brother D. Devaraj Urs, served as the Chief Minister of Karnataka.

== Personal life ==
Kemparaj Urs was born in Kallahalli, Hunsur taluk in Mysore to Devaraj Urs and Deveerammanni. His elder brother was D. Devaraj Urs. Kemparaj was an English literature student. He married his classmate Lalitha and had three daughters. Urs aspired to be a doctor but inspired by Mahatma Gandhi and joined freedom struggle and jailed even.

== Career ==
Urs met doyen of Kannada theatre Gubbi Veeranna and started playing in theatre plays in Gubbi company. In 1942, as an independent producer, Gubbi Veeranna made his first film Jeevana Nataka under his own banner Gubbi Films, casting Kemparaj Urs as the male lead opposite to Shanta Hublikar and M. V. Rajamma. Then in 1947, he played the role Kamsa in the film Krishnaleela which was a hit. His biggest success was Raja Vikrama in 1951 which completed 25 weeks in single theatre. He produced and directed a number of movies in Kannada, Tamil and Telugu. Urs also chaired the "Karnataka Film Development Board".

== Autobiography ==
Kemparaj Urs has written an autobiography, "Aravattu Varshagalu"(Eng: Sixty years), published in 1979.

== Death ==
Kemparaj Urs died on 18 May 1982, surviving his wife and daughters.

== Filmography ==
Year	Title	Credited as			Language	Role	Notes
Year	Title	Director	Producer	Actor	Language	Role	Notes
1942	Jeevana Nataka	✗	✗	✓	Kannada	Mohan	Debut film
1947	Mahananda	✗	✗	✓	Kannada		
1947	Krishnaleela	✗	✗	✓	Kannada	Kamsa	
1948	Bhakta Ramadasa	✓	✗	✓	Kannada	Badh Shaw	
1950	Shiva Parvati	✗	✗	✓	Kannada		
1950	Raja Vikrama	✓	✓	✓	Kannada; Tamil	Vikrama	
1953	Srikrishna	✗	✗	✓	Kannada		
1954	Karkottai	✓	✓	✓	Tamil		
1954	Jaladurga	✓	✓	✓	Kannada		
1957	Nala Damayanti	✓	✓	✓	Kannada; Telugu	Nala	
1959	Azhagarmalai Kalvan	✓	✓	✗	Tamil		
1964	Nava Jeevana	✗	✗	✓	Kannada		
