= Bhaari Bharjari Bete =

Bharjari Bete
- VCD cover
- Directed by: Rajendra Singh Babu
- Screenplay by: Rajendra Singh Babu
- Story by: H. V. Subba Rao
- Produced by: Prathima Devi Shankar Singh
- Starring: Ambareesh; Shankar Nag; Jayamala
- Cinematography: P. S. Prakash
- Edited by: K. Balu
- Music by: Ilaiyaraaja
- Production company: Mahathma Pictures
- Release date: 1981
- Running time: 133 minutes
- Country: India
- Language: Kannada

Bharjari Bete ( transl. Massive hunt) is a 1981 Indian Kannada-language Western action film directed and written by S. V. Rajendra Singh Babu in collaboration with writer H. V. Subba Rao. Produced by Prathima Devi under Mahathma Pictures, the film featured an ensemble cast including Ambareesh, Shankar Nag, Jayamala and Swapna in lead roles with Tiger Prabhakar, Pratima Devi and Vajramuni in supporting roles. Cinematography was handled by P. S. Prakash with editing by K. Balu. Ilaiyaraaja composed the film’s score.

== Plot ==
The film centers on Naga (Ambareesh) and Thyaga (Shankar Nag), two rugged heroes entangled in a high-stakes pursuit to nab criminals wreaking havoc in rural regions. The storyline incorporates action-packed showdowns, chase sequences, and dramatic confrontations. Leela (Jayamala) and Sheela (Swapna) serve as pivotal female characters whose presence influences the heroes’ motivations. Villains like Gajendra (Tiger Prabhakar) and Daanu (Vajramuni) heighten the conflict. The narrative advances through twists involving betrayal, justice, and vigilante heroism, leading to climactic scenes where law, morality, and redemption intertwine. Though interviews specific to the film weren’t found, its synopsis aligns with Babu’s strategy of mixing genre tropes with moral storytelling.

== Cast ==
- Ambareesh as Naga
- Shankar Nag as Tyaga
- Jayamala as Leela
- Swapna as Sheela
- Tiger Prabhakar as Gajendra
- M. P. Shankar as bartender
- Vajramuni as Daanu
- Pratima Devi as Ganga
- Uma Shivakumar
- Rajanand as Chowdappa Nayaka
- Dinesh as Chamkanna
- Rathnakar as Kaka
- Indra George
- Tiptur Siddaramaiah
- Malur Sonnappa
- Vasudeva Girimaji

== Production ==
Production took place between 1980–1981 under Mahatma Pictures. Babu’s sister, Vijayalakshmi Singh, made her debut as the film’s costume designer. The crew used both studio sets and semi-rural outdoor locations to evoke a rugged Western ambience. Ilaiyaraaja was onboarded to provide a vibrant soundtrack with varied genres, including a notable cabaret-style number. Technical support included P. S. Prakash for visuals and K. Balu for editing.

== Soundtrack ==
Bhaari Bharjari Bete

Soundtrack album by Ilaiyaraaja
- Released: 1981
- Genre: Feature film soundtrack
- Label: Saregama

Ilaiyaraaja composed the music for the soundtracks with lyrics written by Chi. Udaya Shankar and R. N. Jayagopal. For the song ""Yaarigagi Aata", Ilaiyaraaja said the "brief demanded a ‘cabaret song’, but he did not want it to sound predictable. He showed how he had used an Indian raga [..], and made the beat choppy and modern". This song was set in Puriya Dhanashree raga. According to Deepa Ganesh of The Hindu wrote "Extremely modern and unconventional in its sensibility, the song is an outstanding rendition by S. Janaki. Ilayaraja lays out a brilliant rhythm pattern that keeps changing its contours".

Track listing
No.	Title	Lyrics	Singer(s)	Length
1.	"Bharjari Bete"	Chi. Udaya Shankar	S. P. Balasubrahmanyam
2.	"Jee Boomba"	Chi. Udaya Shankar	S. P. Balasubrahmanyam
3.	"Sweety Nanna Jodi"	Chi. Udaya Shankar	S. P. Balasubrahmanyam, S. Janaki
4.	"Hakki Goodu Ondu"	R. N. Jayagopal	Ilaiyaraaja
5.	"Yarigaagi Aata"	Chi. Udaya Shankar	S. Janaki
6.	"Ammamma"	R. N. Jayagopal	S. Janaki
