= 3rd National Film Awards =

Indian ceremony celebrating cinema of 1955

- Awarded for: Best of Indian cinema in 1955
- Awarded by: Ministry of Information and Broadcasting
- Presented by: Jawaharlal Nehru (Prime Minister of India)
- Presented on: September 1956
- Site: Vigyan Bhavan, New Delhi
- Official website: dff.nic.in

Highlights
- Best Feature Film: Pather Panchali
- Most awards: • Pather Panchali • Jhanak Jhanak Payal Baaje (2)

The 3rd National Film Awards, then known as State Awards for Films, presented by Ministry of Information and Broadcasting, India to felicitate the best of Indian Cinema released in the year 1955. Ceremony took place at Vigyan Bhavan, New Delhi in September 1956 and awards were given by Prime Minister of India, Jawaharlal Nehru.

== Juries ==
Three different committees were formed based on the film making sectors in India, mainly based in Bombay, Calcutta and Madras. Another committee for all India level was also formed which included some of the members from regional committee. For 3rd National Film Awards, central committee was headed by C. D. Deshmukh.

- Jury Members: Central
  - C. D. Deshmukh (Chairperson) • M. D. Bhat • N. K. Siddhanta • W. S. Krishnaswami Nayudu • Ammu Swaminathan • Sucheta Kriplani • Ramdhari Singh Dinkar • Syed Nurullah • Ardhendu Mukerjee • D. Ramanujam • Sudhir Mukerjee
- Jury Regional: Bombay
  - M. D. Bhat (Chairperson) • Pandit Narendra Sharma • P. N. Arora • Jayant Desai • M. R. Palande • Jagdish Sethi
- Jury Regional: Calcutta
  - N. K. Siddhanta (Chairperson) • Sabita Devi • S. K. Mukerjee • Tarasankar Bandyopadhyay • Kalidas Nag • Sudhir Mukerjee
- Jury Regional: Madras
  - W. S. Krishnaswami Nayudu (Chairperson) • Manjubhashini • Mu. Varadarajan • R. Subbarao • A. Ramaiah • A. Aiyapan • V. K. Gokak • S. M. Naidu

== Awards ==
Awards were divided into feature films and non-feature films.

President's gold medal for the All India Best Feature Film is now better known as National Film Award for Best Feature Film, whereas President's gold medal for the Best Documentary Film is analogous to today's National Film Award for Best Non-Feature Film. For children's films, Prime Minister's gold medal is now given as National Film Award for Best Children's Film. At the regional level, President's silver medal for Best Feature Film is now given as National Film Award for Best Feature Film in a particular language. Certificate of Merit in all the categories is discontinued over the years.

=== Feature films ===
Feature films were awarded at All India as well as regional level. For 3rd National Film Awards, Pather Panchali, a Bengali film by a debutant director Satyajit Ray won the President's gold medal for the All India Best Feature Film. Following were the awards given:

==== All India Award ====
For 3rd National Film Awards, none of the films were awarded from Children's films category as no film was found to be suitable.

Award	Film	Language	Awardee(s)	
Award	Film	Language	Producer	Director
President's gold medal for the All India Best Feature Film	Pather Panchali	Bengali	Government of West Bengal	Satyajit Ray
All India Certificate of Merit	Jhanak Jhanak Payal Baaje	Hindi	Rajkamal Kalamandir	V. Shantaram
All India Certificate of Merit	Shirdi Che Sai Baba	Marathi	Nandadeep chitra	Kumarsen Samarth

==== Regional Award ====
With 3rd National Film Awards, new award category was introduced for the feature films made in Assamese language. This newly introduced category includes President's silver medal for Best Feature Film in Assamese and Certificate of Merit for second and third best film, although former was not given as no film was found suitable for the award.

The awards were given to the best films made in the regional languages of India. For 3rd National Film Awards, President's silver medal for Best Feature Film was not given in Assamese, Bengali, Hindi, Kannada and Tamil language; instead Certificate of Merit was awarded in each particular language.

Award	Film	Awardee(s)	
Award	Film	Producer	Director
Feature Films in Assamese
Certificate of Merit	Piyali Phukan	Rupajyoti Productions	Phani Sarma
Feature Films in Bengali
President's silver medal for Best Feature Film	Pather Panchali	Government of West Bengal	Satyajit Ray
Certificate of Merit	Rani Rashmoni	Chalachitra Pratishthan	Kali Prasad Ghosh
Certificate of Merit	Rai Kamal	Aurora Films Corporation	Subodh Mitra
Feature Films in Hindi
President's silver medal for Best Feature Film	Jhanak Jhanak Payal Baaje	Rajkamal Kalamandir	V. Shantaram
Certificate of Merit	Shree 420	R. K. Films	Raj Kapoor
Certificate of Merit	Devdas	Bimal Roy Productions	Bimal Roy
Feature Films in Kannada
Certificate of Merit	Mahakavi Kalidasa	Lalitakala Film Private Ltd.	Honnappa Bhagavatar
Feature Films in Marathi
President's silver medal for Best Feature Film	Me Tulas Tujhya Angani	Nav Chitra	Raja Thakur
Certificate of Merit	Shevagyachya Shenga	Sadashiv Row J. Kavi	Shantaram Athavale
Feature Films in Tamil
Certificate of Merit	Mangaiyar Thilakam	Vaidya Films	L. V. Prasad
Feature Films in Telugu
President's silver medal for Best Feature Film	Bangaru Papa	Vauhini Productions	B. N. Reddy
Certificate of Merit	Ardhangi	Ragini Films	P. Pullaiah

=== Non-Feature films ===
Non-feature film awards were given for the documentaries made in the country. Following were the awards given:

==== Documentaries ====
Award	Film	Language	Awardee(s)	
Award	Film	Language	Producer	Director
President's gold medal for the Best Documentary Film	Magic of Mountains	English	Films Division	Mushir Ahmed
Certificate of Merit	Wonder of Work	English	Films Division	
Certificate of Merit	Education for Life	English	Ama Ltd.	

=== Awards not given ===
Following were the awards not given as no film was found to be suitable for the award:

- Prime Minister's gold medal for the Best Children's Film
- President's silver medal for Best Feature Film in Assamese
- President's silver medal for Best Feature Film in Bengali
- President's silver medal for Best Feature Film in Hindi
- President's silver medal for Best Feature Film in Kannada
- President's silver medal for Best Feature Film in Malayalam
- President's silver medal for Best Feature Film in Tamil
