= Raja Vikrama =

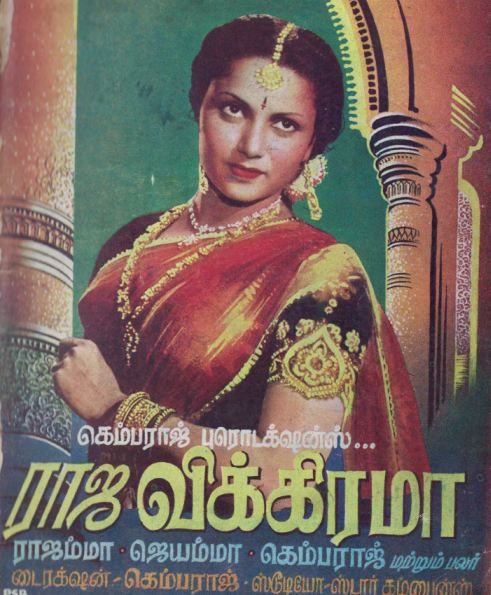
- Raja Vikrama poster
- Directed by: Kemparaj Urs
- Written by: Hunsur Krishnamurthy (Kannada) 'Chidambaram' A. M. Natarajan Kavi (Tamil)
- Screenplay by: Kemparaj Urs
- Story by: Kemparaj Urs
- Produced by: Kemparaj Urs
- Starring: Kemparaj Urs; B. Jayamma; N. S. Subbaiah; Rajamma
- Cinematography: M. S. Mani; B. Subba Rao
- Edited by: C. V. Raju
- Music by: S. Rajam
- Production company: Kemparaj Productions
- Release date: 29 November 1950
- Country: India
- Languages: Tamil; Kannada

Raja Vikrama ( transl. King Vikrama) is a 1950 Indian historical drama film, directed and produced by Kemparaj Urs. The film stars Kemparaj Urs as Vikraman, B. Jayamma, N. S. Subbaiah and M. V. Rajamma. It was simultaneously shot in Tamil and Kannada languages. The Kannada version was titled Shaneeshwara Mahatme. The Tamil version was released on 29 November 1950.

== Cast ==
Male cast

- Kemparaj Urs as Vikraman
- N. S. Subbaiah as Bangaru
- Stunt Somu as Commander
- Sethuraman as Clown
- C. V. V. Panthulu as King's Adviser
- Ganapathi Bhatt as Good Man
- Mani Iyer as Chandrasena King
- Jayaram as Kalan

Female cast

- B. Jayamma as Prabhavathi
- Rajamma as Kamini
- Pandari Bai as Padmini
- Angamuthu as Female Clown
- Sarathambal as Kamakshi

== Soundtrack ==
Music is composed by S. Rajam.

Song	Singer/s	Lyrics	Duration (m:ss)
"Paazhum Aduppa Oothi Oothi"	S. Rajam & Ganthimathi	A. M. Nadaraja Kavi	02:59
"Nadho Pasanaiye Nararukke"	S. Rajam	A. M. Nadaraja Kavi	03:24
"Varapora Mappillai Murukkuvan"	Jikki	A. M. Nadaraja Kavi	03:28
"Kokila Kandathin Gaaname Kettu"	S. Rajam & Ganthimathi	A. M. Nadaraja Kavi	03:56
"Aanantha Paramaananthame"	Ganthimathi	A. M. Nadaraja Kavi	03:07
"Kanavinile Kai Pidittha"	Ganthimathi	A. M. Nadaraja Kavi	03:07
"Kaattu Vazhi"	Ganthimathi	A. M. Nadaraja Kavi	02:46
"Oramaaga Poyi"	S. Rajam	A. M. Nadaraja Kavi	03:09
"Sugirtha Nagai Seiyum"	Ganthimathi	A. M. Nadaraja Kavi	02:10
"Jothiyai Tharuga Nee"	S. Rajam	A. M. Nadaraja Kavi	03:19
