= Vijayalakshmi Singh =

Indian Kannada actress, director, costume designer

- Born: 19 July 1959 (age 67); Mysore, Karnataka, India
- Other name: Munni
- Education: Mysore University
- Occupations: Actress; producer; director; costume designer
- Spouse: Jai Jagadish
- Children: 3
- Parent(s): D. Shankar Singh; Prathima Devi
- Relatives: Rajendra Singh Babu (brother); Aditya (nephew); Rishika Singh (niece)

Vijayalakshmi Singh is an Indian actress, director, costume designer and producer in Kannada. She has acted in many Kannada films and television projects.

== Early life ==
Vijayalakshmi was born in Mysore to filmmaker D. Shankar Singh and actress Prathima Devi. Film director Rajendra Singh Babu is her elder brother..

== Career ==
Vijayalakshmi debuted as a heroine in 1981 and went on to star opposite top Kannada actors of the time like Vishnuvardhan, Anant Nag, Ravichandran, Ambareesh, Ramakrishna, Ashok and Jai Jagadish. She has acted under the direction of stalwarts like Puttanna Kanagal, K. Balachander, Geethapriya, K. S. L. Swamy and Nagathihalli Chandrashekhar.

Vijayalakshmi wears many hats. She was a costume designer for many of Rajendra Singh Babu's films like Bhaari Bharjari Bete, Bandhana and Hoovu Hannu. She started working as production controller with Rani Maharani. She has directed several successful Kannada movies with popular stars, including Ee Bandhana, Male Barali Manju Irali and Sweety Nanna Jodi. She has also acted in the Kannada television serial (2020) Jothe Jotheyali.

== Personal life ==
Vijayalakshmi is married to Kannada actor Jai Jagadish. The couple has three daughters Vaisiri, Vaibhavi and Vainidhi who made their acting debut in the Kannada film Yaana (2019) directed by her.

== Filmography ==
=== As actress ===
Year	Film	Role	Notes
1981	Shreeman	Shyamala	
1982	Praya Praya Praya		
1983	Jaggu		
1983	Benkiyalli Aralida Hoovu	Chandra	
1983	Dharani Mandala Madhyadolage	Neela	
1984	Huli Hejje		
1984	Shapatha		
1985	Pithamaha	Girija	
1985	Masanada Hoovu	Shantha	
1986	Dharma		
1986	Seelu Nakshatra	Shobha	
1989	Hongkongnalli Agent Amar		Special appearance
2001	Chitte		
2002	Nanna Preethiya Hudugi		
2010	Veera Parampare	Almelu	
2019	Raajakumara	Sujatha	
2022	Petromax	Sudha Murthy	
2023	Ghost	Home Minister	

=== As director ===
- Ee Bandhana (2007)
- Male Barali Manju Irali (2009)
- Vaare Vah (2010)
- Sweety Nanna Jodi (2013)
- Yaana (2019)
