= Hemareddy Mallamma =

- Directed by: S. Soundarya Rajan; G. R. Rao
- Screenplay by: Bellave Narahari Shastri
- Produced by: Gubbi Veeranna
- Starring: B. Jayamma; Honnappa Bhagavathar; Gubbi Veeranna; C. B. Mallappa
- Music by: V. Nagayya
- Release date: 14 January 1946
- Country: India
- Language: Kannada

Hemareddy Mallamma is a 1946 Indian Kannada-language film, directed by S. Soundarya Rajan and produced by Gubbi Veeranna. The film stars the director's spouse B. Jayamma, as well as Honnappa Bhagavathar, Veeranna and C. B. Mallappa. The film has musical score by V. Nagayya.

== Cast ==
- B. Jayamma as Mallamma
- Honnappa Bhagavathar
- Gubbi Veeranna as Hemareddy
- C. B. Mallappa
- K. R. Seetharama Sastry

== Soundtrack ==
The music was composed by V. Nagayya.

No.	Song	Singers	Lyrics	Length (m:ss)
1	"Mallikaarjuna Palsu"	B. Jayamma	H. S. Rao	03:05
2	"Shivane Ninna Neneye Namma"	S. Janaki	Dr. Rao	03:19
3	"Shubhadathe Gomaathe"	B. Jayamma	H. S. Rao	02:26
4	"Jagame Maya"	C. Honnappa Bhagavathar		02:24

== See also ==
- Hemareddy Mallamma (saint) subject of the film
- Mahasadhvi Mallamma 2005 film
