= Rajasuya Yaaga =

- Directed by: T. Dwarakanath
- Produced by: Timmiah
- Starring: S. R. Vasudevarao; T. K. Ramamurhty; K. R. Seetharama Sastry; T. Jayamma
- Music by: H. R. Padmanabha Shashtri
- Release date: 1937
- Country: India
- Language: Kannada

Not to be confused with the ritual named Rajasuya.

Rajasuya Yaaga is a 1937 Indian Kannada Hindu mythological film, directed by T. Dwarakanath and produced by Timmiah. The film stars S. R. Vasudevarao, T. K. Ramamurhty, K. R. Seetharama Sastry and T. Jayamma in the lead roles. The film has musical score by H. R. Padmanabha Shashtri.

== Cast ==
- S. R. Vasudevarao
- T. K. Ramamurhty
- K. R. Seetharama Sastry
- T. Jayamma
- T. Chandrashekar
- E. V. Saroja
- K. V. Achuta Rao
