= Jaganmohini (2009 film) =

2009 Indian Tamil horror film by N. K. Viswanathan

- DVD cover
- Directed by: N. K. Viswanathan
- Written by: Pugazhmani (dialogues)
- Based on: Jaganmohini (Kannada)
- Produced by: H. Murali
- Starring: Raja; Namitha; Nila
- Cinematography: N. K. Viswanathan
- Edited by: Suresh Urs
- Music by: Ilaiyaraaja
- Production company: Murali Cine Arts
- Release date: 16 October 2009
- Running time: 147 minutes
- Country: India
- Language: Tamil

Jaganmohini is a 2009 Indian Tamil-language historical horror film directed by N. K. Viswanathan. It is based on B. Vittalacharya's 1978 Telugu film of the same name which itself was a remake of the 1951 Kannada film Jaganmohini. The film stars Raja, Namitha and Meera Chopra, credited as Nila. It was partially reshot into Telugu with the same name, with Ali replacing Vadivelu and Gundu Hanumantha Rao replacing Vennira Aadai Moorthy.

== Plot ==
The film begins at Pachai Theevu, ruled by a mighty king (Narasimha Raju). His son and prince Jagathalapradhapan (Raja) is a valorous youth who sets out on a mission to capture pirates in the sea. He lands at Sangu Theevu, where the head of the sea pirates Alai Kallan lives. Jagathalapradhapan comes across Mohini (Namitha) from the local fishing community on the island. Romance blossoms between them. Jagathalapradhapan manages to capture Alai Kallan and decides to return to his country. He promises Mohini that he would bring his parents to arrange for their wedding. However the King and his wife Mangayarkarasi (Yuvarani) arranges for their son's marriage with a princess Azhagu Nachiyar (Nila). Jagathalapradhapan tries hard to convince his parents that he would marry only Mohini.

To put an end to the problem, the king and his wife hatch a conspiracy and kills Mohini while she is in underwater using thugs. Enters a cruel tantrik (Kota Sreenivasa Rao), who uses the feud between Jagathalapradhapan and Alai Kallan and plans to kill Jagathalapradhapan and thereby get the ultimate power to rule the world. But all his plans are altered when Mohini's spirit comes back to earth. She prevents tantrum to near Jagathalaprathapan. Meanwhile, Mohini wishes to kill Jagathalaprathapan by luring him to have sex with her in an isolated forest so that she can unite with him in heaven, but the plan gets spoiled by Azhagu Nachiyar's smart tricks. Tantrik wants to kill Jagathalaprathapan using Alaikalan so that Goddess will get happy and grant his wish, but instead Jagathalaprathapan kills Alaikalan diverting it. Goddess wants him to ask his wish and she asks for Mohini to get back to her body but it's naturally impossible. Instead she inserts her soul into Azhagu Nachiyar's as alternative so that she gets "motcham" (salvation). They happily rule the kingdom ever after in the end.

== Cast ==
- Raja as Jagathalapradhapan
- Namitha as Jaganmohini
- Nila as Azhagu Nachiyar
- Vadivelu as Jaganmohan
- Kota Srinivasa Rao as Sidhar
- Riyaz Khan as Indrajith
- Narasimha Raju as the King
- Yuvarani as Mangayarkarasi
- Jyothi Lakshmi as Jaganmohini and Jaganmohan's mother
- Bala Singh
- Vennira Aadai Moorthy as Jaganmohan's Assistant
- Shobana as Koda Molakki Kokila
- Madhan Bob as Azhagu Nachiyar's brother
- Alex
- Suruli Manohar
- Crane Manohar

== Production ==
Producer H. Murali said Namitha was the only choice for playing the title character because the team felt she had both glam and acting skills. While the film acts as a remake, minor changes were made to "suit the times". The scene where Jaganmohini harvests pearls underwater was filmed at Andaman.

== Soundtrack ==
Soundtrack was composed by Ilaiyaraaja. The audio was launched in 21 August 2009.

Song	Singers	Lyrics
"Ponmanatheril"	Bela Shende	Na. Muthukumar
"Nilavu Varum"	Ujjaini, Shweta Mohan	Na. Muthukumar
"Poothadu Poo"	Rita, Rahul Nambiar	Vaali
"Kattikitta"	Nancy Vincent, Rahul Nambiar, Chorus	Vaali
"Unnai Vittal"	K. S. Chithra	Vaali

== Release and reception ==
Jaganmohini was previously scheduled to release on 15 June 2009, and 25 September, but the Madras High Court put a stay on its release until 15 October due to the producer's financial debts. Pavithra Srinivasan Rediff.com wrote, "With its silly storyline and terrible costumes, Jaganmohini is a half-baked remake of the original, with plenty of skin-show and terrible graphics". Sify wrote, "The basic trouble with the film is that story and presentation of NK Viswanathan is outdated with tacky special effects that have the audiences jeering. The film simply doesn’t work". The New Indian Express wrote, "with all the technical advancement over the years since the earlier version, one expects the special effects to be of a much higher quality and provide more thrill and fun". S. R. Ashok Kumar of The Hindu wrote, "Big technicians have aided director Viswanathan who deserves credit for his camera work. But he could have worked more on the script".

Post-release, Chopra expressed displeasure with the fact that many of her scenes were deleted from the film.
