= Rani Honnamma =

- Directed by: K. R. Seetharama Sastry
- Written by: K. R. Seetharama Sastry
- Screenplay by: K. R. Seetharama Sastry
- Produced by: T. S. Karibasaiah
- Starring: Rajkumar; Leelavathi
- Cinematography: K. Prabhakar; Babulnath
- Edited by: Bal G Yadav; M. Thathayya
- Music by: Vijaya Bhaskar
- Distributed by: Girija & Suryaprabha Productions
- Release date: 22 March 1960
- Running time: 137 minutes
- Country: India
- Language: Kannada

Rani Honnamma is a 1960 Indian historical drama film in Kannada language, directed and written by K. R. Seetharama Sastry and produced by Karibasaiah. The film stars Rajkumar and Leelavathi.

== Cast ==
- Rajkumar
- Leelavathi as Honnamma
- Lalitha Rao
- M. Jayashree
- Narasimharaju as Manjanna
- Balakrishna
- M. N. Lakshmi Devi
- Papamma
- G. V. Iyer

== Soundtrack ==
The music for the film was composed by Vijaya Bhaskar and lyrics for the soundtrack written by Ku. Ra. Seetharama Shastry. The songs "Haarutha Doora Doora" and "Jeevana Hoovina Haasige" were received very well and considered one of the evergreen hits in Kannada film industry.

=== Track list ===
#	Title	Singer(s)	Lyrics
1	"Kolu Gejje Kaalu Gejje"	S. Janaki	K. R. Seetharama Sastry
2	"Ettha Hogenu"	P. Susheela	Ku. Ra. Si
3	"Malagida Haavidu"	P. Susheela	Ku. Ra. Si
4	"Jeevana Hoovina Haasige"	P. B. Sreenivas, A.P. Komala	Ku. Ra. Si
5	"Haarutha Doora Doora"	P. B. Sreenivas, P. Susheela	Ku. Ra. Si
6	"Baara Neera Manohara"	P. Susheela	Ku. Ra. Si
7	"Naa Thaalalarenu"	P. Susheela	Ku. Ra. Si
8	"Srikrishnanekinta"	P. B. Sreenivas, S. Janaki	Ku. Ra. Si
9	"Raja Rajeshwariya"	P. B. Sreenivas	Ku. Ra. Si
