= K. R. Seetharama Sastry =

- Born: 22 September 1922; Kingdom of Mysore, British India
- Died: 12 November 1977 (aged 55)
- Occupations: Actor; film director; lyricist; producer; screenwriter; composer

K. R. Seetharama Sastry, popularly known as Ku. Ra. Seetharama Sastry or simply Ku. Ra. Si, was an Indian actor, writer, lyricist and director in Kannada film industry. After a career in theatre, Sastry's career in films was those of an actor, director, producer, screenwriter, lyricist and an occasional composer. He is considered one of the most influential personalities in the history of Kannada cinema.

Sastry began his film career as an actor in the mythological film Rajasuya Yaaga (1937). After a brief stint as an actor, he turned into director, lyricist, writer and music composer for the film Mahakavi Kalidasa (1955) which emerged as a biggest commercial and critical success of the year. The film won the President's silver medal for Best feature film for the year.

Ku. Raa. Si. was offered the lead role in the 1954 movie Bedara Kannappa by Gubbi Veeranna. However, he rejected it owing to the opportunity he got to work in the direction department of Shaw Brothers Studio, Hong Kong. The role was subsequently played by Rajkumar who went on to be the matinee idol of Kannada cinema.

Apart from Kannada language, Sastry directed 2 movies in Malay language: Kuraana Kaav and Iman (1954) – both of which were selected for the international film festival of Japan – thereby making him the first director from Karnataka whose movies were exhibited in an international platform. He also won international award for his direction.

== Early life ==
Seetharama Sastry hailed from the Mysore Kingdom and was very active in theater during his early age. He found tutelage under Gubbi Veeranna, who is considered the pioneer of Kannada cinema. All his initial movies as an actor was directed by Veeranna.

== Filmography ==
Year	Film	Language	Functioned as				Notes
Year	Film	Language	director	Composer	Writer (Screenplay/ Lyrics)	Actor	Notes
1937	Rajasuya Yaaga	Kannada				Yes	
1945	Hemareddy Mallamma	Kannada				Yes	
1953	Gunasagari	Kannada			Yes		Also assistant director
1954	Iman	Malay	Yes				
1955	Mahakavi Kalidasa	Kannada	Yes	Yes	Yes	Yes	National Film Award for Best Feature Film in Kannada
1956	Sadaarame	Kannada	Yes				
1956	Ohileshwara	Kannada			Yes		
1956	Hari Bhakta	Kannada			Yes		
1958	Anna Thangi	Kannada	Yes		Yes		
1958	Bhookailasa	Kannada			Yes		
1960	Rani Honnamma	Kannada	Yes			Yes	
1962	Thejaswini	Kannada			Yes		
1963	Veera Kesari	Kannada			Yes		
1963	Mana Mecchida Madadi	Kannada	Yes		Yes		
1963	Jenu Goodu	Kannada			Yes		
1963	Kanyarathna	Kannada			Yes		
1963	Gowri	Kannada			Yes		
1964	Thumbida Koda	Kannada			Yes		
1964	Shivarathri Mahathme	Kannada				Yes	
1964	Muriyada Mane	Kannada			Yes		
1965	Mavana Magalu	Kannada			Yes		
1965	Beratha Jeeva	Kannada	Yes		Yes	Yes	Also producer
1966	Madhu Malathi	Kannada			Yes		
1968	Manassakshi	Kannada			Yes		
1969	Suvarna Bhoomi	Kannada			Yes		
1969	Mallammana Pavaada	Kannada			Yes		
1969	Madhura Milana	Kannada			Yes		
1969	Kalpavruksha	Kannada	Yes				
1970	Takka Bitre Sikka	Kannada			Yes		
1970	Nadina Bhagya	Kannada			Yes	Yes	
1971	Sothu Geddavalu	Kannada			Yes		
1971	Samshaya Phala	Kannada			Yes	Yes	
1971	Baala Bandhana	Kannada			Yes		
1972	Triveni	Kannada			Yes		
1973	Devaru Kotta Thangi	Kannada			Yes		
1974	Professor Huchuraya	Kannada			Yes		
1974	Anna Atthige	Kannada			Yes		
1975	Onde Roopa Eradu Guna	Kannada			Yes		
1975	Nireekshe	Kannada			Yes		
1978	Devadaasi	Kannada			Yes		

== Awards ==
- 1955 – 3rd National Film Awards – Certificate of Merit – Mahakavi Kalidasa
