= Bhakta Ramadas (film) =

- Directed by: Kemparaj Urs
- Produced by: D. Shankar Singh
- Starring: Kemparaj Urs; Sumathi Kashinath; Vimalananda Das
- Music by: P. Kalinga Rao
- Release date: 1948
- Country: India
- Language: Kannada

Bhakta Ramadas is a 1948 Indian Kannada film, directed by Kemparaj Urs and produced by D. Shankar Singh. The film stars Kemparaj Urs, Sumathi Kashinath and Vimalananda Das in the lead roles. The film has musical score by P. Kalinga Rao.

== Cast ==
- Kemparaj Urs as Ramadas
- Sumathi Kashinath
- Vimalananda Das
