= Jeevana Nataka =

1943 Indian Kannada film produced by Gubbi Veeranna

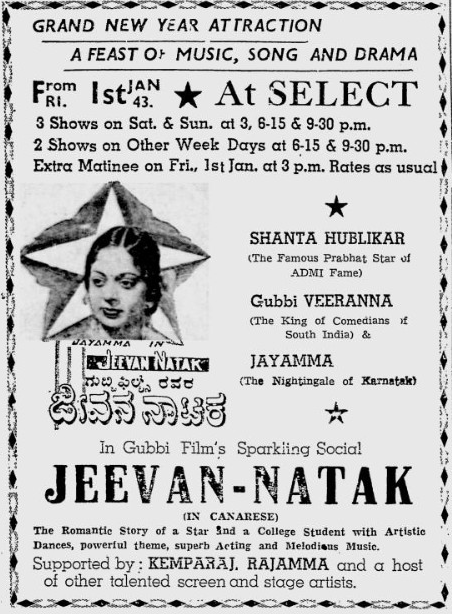
- Advertisement poster
- Directed by: Wahab Kashmiri
- Screenplay by: A. N. Krishna Rao
- Story by: A. N. Krishna Rao
- Produced by: Gubbi Veeranna
- Starring: Gubbi Veeranna; Kemparaj Urs; Shanta Hublikar; B. Jayamma
- Music by: S. V. Venkatraman; Ramayyar Shirur; Harmonium Sheshagirirao
- Production company: Gubbi Films
- Release date: 1 January 1943
- Running time: 160 minutes
- Country: British Raj
- Language: Kannada

Jeevana Nataka is a 1943 Indian Kannada film directed by Wahab Kashmiri, based on a play of the same name written by A. N. Krishna Rao. The film was produced by Gubbi Veeranna, his first as an independent producer. Veeranna also appeared in a lead role in the film alongside debutante Kemparaj Urs, Shanta Hublikar and B. Jayamma.

== Cast ==
The cast of the film:

- Gubbi Veeranna as Anand
- D. Kemparaj Urs as Mohan
- Shanta Hublikar as Kamala
- B. Jayamma as Padma
- Singanallur Puttaswamayya
- Basavarajappa
- Mohana Kumari
- Muradi Kulla
- Entadi Lambu
- Rajamma
- Sundaramma
- Kamalamma
- Kamalabai
- Sundaribai
- Sharadamma
- Vijaya (credited as Baby Vijaya)
- M. G. Marirao
- Mahabala Rao
- Krishnamurthy
- B Hanumanthaiah
- Raju
- Radhakrishna
- M. C. Veer

== Production ==
Wahab Kashmiri was a theatre personality working in Calcutta's New Theatre group. The film was his first in Kannada as director. The writer A. N. Krishna Rao, who wrote the film's story, assisted him by handing him over the story in English, and the dialogues. The film was also Gubbi Veeranna's first as an independent producer and produced under the banner Gubbi Films.

Future actor Rajkumar's father and stage actor Singanalluru Puttaswamayya was voice-tested for acting in the film. "Since his voice was rough and did not suit cinema, he was asked to dub for his voice by holding the mike far away from his mouth." D. Kemparaj Urs, the brother of future Chief Minister of Mysore State, D. Devaraj Urs, made his acting debut in the film. Filming took in Central Studios, Coimbatore, for a year before release on 1 January 1943.

== Reception ==
The reviewer for The Indian Express wrote, "Apart from Veeranna's superb comedy, Jayamma and Shanta Hublikar put over grand performances. Lilting music is provided in plenty."
