= Dada Mukerjee =

Indian writer (1913-1970)

Sudhir Mukerjee (16 November 1913 – 10 September 1997), better known as Dada Mukerjee, (Note: Dada meaning elder brother in Hindi and Bengali.) was an Indian writer who was professor of Economics at Allahabad University, Uttar Pradesh, India. He is best known as a close devotee of Neem Karoli Baba (known to his devotees as Maharajji). Starting 14 July 1958, when they moved into the "Red House" at No. 4 Church Lane, Baba Neem Karoli resided with Mukerjee and his wife Kamala (or Didi, elder sister) during the winters. This continued until Baba Neem Karoli's Mahasamadhi in 1973.

After Baba Neem Karoli's Mahasamadhi, Mukerjee wrote two English-language books about him: By His Grace: A Devotee's Story, and The Near and the Dear: Stories of Neem Karoli Baba and His Devotees. These works are, in part, autobiographical as well. Mukerjee is also mentioned in passing in Ram Dass's book Miracle of Love: Stories about Neem Karoli Baba.

== Works ==
- Mukerjee, Dada (1990). By His Grace: A Devotee's Story. Santa Fe, NM: Hanuman Foundation Publishing. ISBN 0-9628878-7-0.
- Mukerjee, Dada (2012) [1996]. The Near and The Dear. Santa Fe, New Mexico: Hanuman Foundation Publishing. ISBN 978-1-887474-02-3.
