= Nagakanye =

Naga Kanye
- Directed by: S. V. Rajendra Singh Babu
- Written by: Hunsur Krishnamurthy (dialogues)
- Screenplay by: S. V. Rajendra Singh Babu
- Story by: D. Shankar Singh
- Produced by: S. V. Rajendra Singh Babu
- Starring: Vishnuvardhan; Bhavani; Rajasree; Halam
- Cinematography: M. R. K. Murthy
- Edited by: P. U. S. Maniyam
- Music by: Satyam
- Production company: Mahathma Productions
- Distributed by: Mahathma Productions
- Release date: 7 August 1975
- Running time: 131 minutes
- Country: India
- Language: Kannada

Naga Kanye is a 1975 Indian Kannada-language action film directed produced by S. V. Rajendra Singh Babu, in his directorial debut. He also co-wrote the story along with his father, D. Shankar Singh. The film starred Vishnuvardhan, Bhavani, Rajasree and Halam in lead roles while Ambareesh and Tiger Prabhakar played cameo roles. The music for the film was composed by Satyam. It was released on 7 August 1975.

== Plot ==
The story begins in a small village where people believe in the power of snakes and ancient rituals. A wealthy landlord’s family owns a sacred jewel said to be protected by a mystical serpent maiden, the Nagakanye. This jewel becomes the center of greed and conflict when outsiders try to steal it for wealth and power.

The film follows the brave young man who returns to his ancestral home and learns about the legend of the Nagakanye. He meets the heroine (Bhavani), who is linked to the serpent maiden’s curse. Strange events start happening—dreams, mysterious appearances, and unexplained deaths—creating fear in the village. The hero decides to uncover the truth behind these incidents.

As the story moves forward, the hero discovers that the jewel is tied to an old promise made by his forefathers. Breaking this promise will bring destruction. The villain, driven by greed, tries to take the jewel, leading to dramatic confrontations. The Nagakanye appears in her divine form during the climax, punishing the wrongdoers and restoring balance. The film ends with the hero and heroine united, and the jewel returned to its sacred place, showing that faith and honesty win over greed and evil.

== Cast ==
- Vishnuvardhan
- Bhavani
- Rajasree
- Pramila
- Halam
- Thoogudeepa Srinivas
- Rajanand
- Ambareesh in Special Appearance
- Tiger Prabhakar in Guest Appearance
- B. V. Radha in Guest Appearance

== Soundtrack ==
The music was composed by Satyam. The songs were sung by S. P. Balasubrahmanyam and S. Janaki while the lyrics were written by Hunsur Krishnamurthy and Chi. Udayashankar.

No.	Title	Lyrics	Singer(s)	Length
1.	"Eke Heegeke"	Hunsur Krishnamurthy	S. Janaki
2.	"Saagali Guri Serali"	Hunsur Krishnamurthy	S. P. Balasubrahmanyam
3.	"Cheluvinarasa Baaro"	Chi. Udayashankar	S. Janaki
4.	"Nodora Kannella"	Chi. Udayashankar	S. Janaki
5.	"Bedaginarasi Baare"	Chi. Udayashankar	S. P. Balasubrahmanyam, S. Janaki
6.	"Brahma Murari"	Hunsur Krishnamurthy	S. P. Balasubrahmanyam
