= Hemareddy Mallamma (saint) =

14th-century saint

Hemareddy Mallamma was a female saint in the 14th century. The Karnataka government observes Hemareddy Mallamma Jayanti on May 10 every year.

== Early life and career ==
Hemareddy Mallamma was born in the 14th century in the North Karnataka region. She was an ardent devotee of Lord Shiva in the form of Srisailam Mallikarjuna (one of the Jyotirlingas). She grew up in a family of Veerashaiva Lingayata devotees and followed the path of Basavanna. She went through a lot of torture by her sisters-in-law and even suffered murder attempts by them before they threw her out of the house. She started to live in a forest and continued her devotional practices. Srisailam Mallikarjuna (Lord Shiva) was pleased by her devotion, appeared before her and offered a boon. She asked him to give wealth to her family despite being tortured by them. She asked for her family to have wealth, do charity and not have ego. She is referred as Mahasadhvi, which means a great woman.

== See also ==
- Hemareddy Mallamma 1946 film
- Mahasadhvi Mallamma 2005 film
