= Kalladka =

- Location within Karnataka
- Coordinates: 12.8447°N 75.0612°E
- Country: India
- State: Karnataka
- Region: Tulu Nadu
- District: Dakshina Kannada
- Time zone: IST

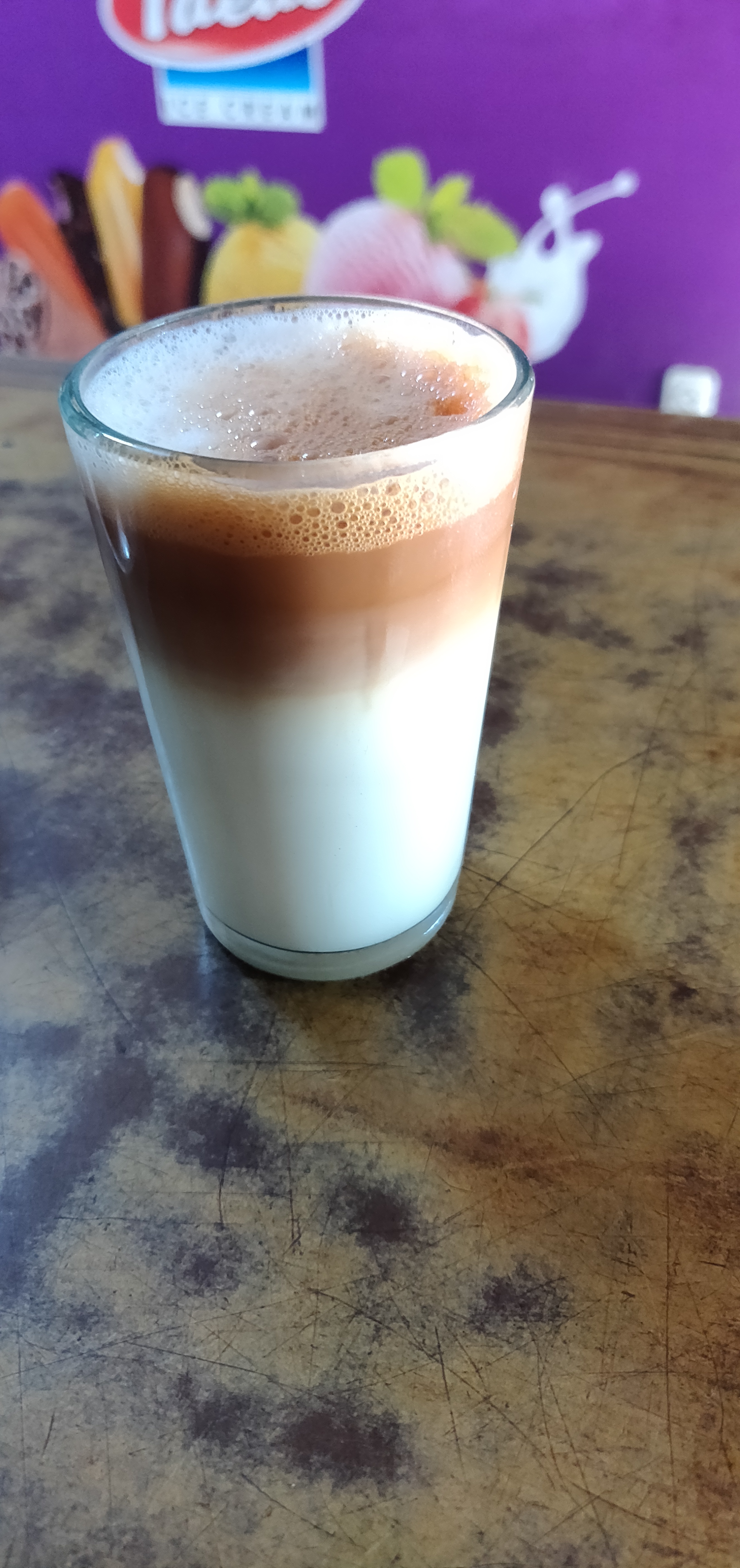
Kalladka Tea

Kalladka is a town or a city in Bantwal taluk, Karnataka, India. It is famous for KT (Kalladka Tea or Kadak Tea). Kalladka is located 32 km east of Mangalore city. It is a town or city in Bantval Taluk in Dakshina Kannada District of Karnataka State. It is also referred to as the midpoint town between Mangaluru and the Ghat Sections of Southern Karnataka, connecting Dakshina Kannada to Chikmagalur, Kodagu District, Hassan, Kasaragod, Kannur and parts of Wayanad.
