= Krishna Sudhaama =

- Directed by: K. Subramanyam
- Written by: Bellave Narahari Shastri (dialogues)
- Screenplay by: Bellave Narahari Shastri
- Starring: Bellave Narahari Shastri; S. D. Subbalakshmi
- Music by: Parthasarthi Iyengar
- Release date: 1943
- Country: India
- Language: Kannada

Krishna Sudhaama is a 1943 Indian Kannada film, directed by K. Subramanyam. The film stars Bellave Narahari Shastri and S. D. Subbalakshmi. The film has a musical score by Parthasarthi Iyengar.

== Cast ==
- Bellave Narahari Shastri
- S. D. Subbalakshmi

== Soundtrack ==
The music was composed by Parthasarthi Iyengar.

No.	Song	Singers	Lyrics	Length (m:ss)
1	"Idhigo Kandenu"	S. D. Subbulakshmi	Bellave Narahari Sastry	02:38
2	"Yadukula Nandana"	S. D. Subbulakshmi	Bellave Narahari Sastry	02:50
