= Rashtrottahana Parishat =

Rashtrotthana Parishat
- Formation: 1965
- Type: Not for profit - registered trust
- Headquarters: Keshava Shilpa, Kempegowda Nagar, Bengaluru-560 019
- Location: Bangalore, Karnataka, India
- Website: rashtrotthana.org

Rashtrotthana Parishat is a social service organisation in Karnataka, India, founded in Bangalore in 1965. It is an initiative started by few social workers to bring social reforms through service activities and publications in Karnataka.

Rashtrotthana Parishat runs various projects across Karnataka.

Rashtrotthana Rakta Nidhi (Blood Bank) is one among those. It was established in Chamarajpet, Bangalore in 1993. It is an ISO certified blood bank, provides blood for the needy 24 hours each day.

From 2011 to 2012, the blood bank collected 48,647 units of blood through various blood donation camps, and is reported to be the largest blood bank in the state.

== Other projects ==
Other projects run by Rashtrotthana Parishat include:

- Jagarana Prakalpa
- Rashtrotthana Educational Institutions
- Rashtrotthana Yogic Sciences & Research Institute
- Rashtrotthana Arogyaseva Kendra
- Goshala
- Rashtrotthana Balaga
- Rashtrotthana Sahitya
- Rashtrotthana Mudranalaya
- Tapas
- Sadhana
- Samraksha
