= D. Shankar Singh =

Indian Kannada filmmaker

- Born: Kingdom of Mysore, British India
- Occupations: Film director, screenwriter, producer
- Spouse: Prathima Devi
- Relatives: S. V. Rajendra Singh Babu (son); Vijayalakshmi Singh (daughter); Jai Jagadish (son-in-law); Aditya (grandson); Rishika Singh (grand daughter)

D. Shankar Singh was an Indian film director, producer, screenwriter, exhibitor and a freedom fighter during the British rule in India. Singh, along with B. Vittalacharya co-founded the "Mahatma Pictures", a production venture in 1946, that has produced over a hundred Kannada films. The very first film to release under this banner was Krishnaleela in 1947. His first directorial project was Jaganmohini in 1951. The film is recorded in history as one of the first Kannada films to have screened for over 100 days in cinema halls.

Some of the popular films under his production and direction include Bhakta Ramadas (1948), Nagakannika (1949), Dallali (1953), Madiddunno Maraaya (1954), Gandharva Kanya (1955), Bhale Kiladi (1970) and Bangarada Kalla (1973).

== Career ==
Shankar Singh was an employee with the Brooke Bond Tea company. His interest towards films brought him closer to yet another budding director B. Vittalacharya. In 1942, they both initially formed two touring talkies named after Mahatma Gandhi and Jawaharlal Nehru and called them "Mahatma Touring Talkies" and "Jawahar Touring Talkies" respectively. He actively took part in the freedom struggles during the British rule in India and was a staunch follower of Gandhi. Following the successful run of the touring talkies units, the duo formed a new production house and named it "Mahatma Pictures" in 1946.

In 1947, the production house released their first venture Krishnaleela, starring Kemparaj Urs in the lead role, the film also featured Varadaraj, younger brother of actor Rajkumar and Sharadamma, both making their debuts. The film was directed by C. V. Raju and had a musical score by P. Kalinga Rao, who was noted from this film and also marked the debut of the lyricist Kunigal Prabhakar Shastry and acclaimed writer Hunsur Krishnamurthy. The film was received well with Varadaraj's comedy role of Makaranda being appreciated. Their second production project was in 1948, with the Kemparaj Urs-directed devotional drama Bhakta Ramadas. In 1949, Singh and Vittalacharya produced Nagakannika, directed by G. Vishwanathan and featuring Jayashri in the lead role. The film was talked about for its glamorous role portrayed by Jayashri.

In the next decade, Singh became a full-fledged screenwriter and director with his debut film Jaganmohini, becoming one of the first most commercially successful films in Kannada cinema history. Starring Harini and Prathima Devi, the film screened across Karnataka for more than 100 days. In 1952, he partnered with Vittalacharya in both direction and production for the film Sri Srinivasa Kalyana, featuring Vimalananda Das and Prathima Devi in stellar roles. It also marked the film-acting debut of Rajkumar, who was given a brief character to play; one of the seven Saptarishis. In 1953, Singh produced and directed Dallali, featuring Subbanna in the lead role and in the same year he introduced his son Rajendra Singh Babu in the film Chanchala Kumari.

Throughout the 1950s and 60s, Singh produced and directed many successful films and became one of the most commercially viable artists in Kannada cinema. All his films were shot at the Navajyothi Studio in Mysore.

== Legacy ==
Shankar Singh is often referred to as one of the legendary filmmakers of the early Kannada cinema era. He is believed to be a staunch follower of Mahatma Gandhi and actively participated in the freedom campaigns across Karnataka. His passion towards the arts field drove him to collaborate with a hotelier, B. Vittalacharya and produce some of the best known Kannada films starting from the mid-1940s. Although during that era, all Kannada films were being made and shot in Madras (the present Chennai), Singh is believed to have not moved to Madras for any of his projects. All his films were being shot at Navajyothi Studios in Mysore. Mahatma pictures is also noted for breaking conventions and being experimental towards film making. It was also a pioneer in introducing graphical effects in Kannada cinema by adapting many trick shots in many mythological and folklore films.

Recognizing Singh's determination of making Kannada films in Karnataka, the Government began to subsidize Kannada films. In 1962, Singh insisted the then Chief Minister S. Nijalingappa to extend the patronage for films made in Karnataka. Considering his point, the Government levied a surcharge of a rupee per ticket to fund the development of Kannada industry. Singh is credited to be first to explore the shooting locales in and around Karnataka.

Apart from the leading actor of Kannada cinema, Dr. Rajkumar, Mahatma Pictures has the distinction of introducing many successful artists to the film industry such as P. Kalinga Rao, Rajan–Nagendra, T. N. Balakrishna, Hunsur Krishnamurthy and Arjun Sarja among others.

== Personal life and family ==
Shankar Singh was married to the actress Prathima Devi, who played lead roles in many of his directorial and production projects. Their son Rajendra Singh Babu and daughter Vijayalakshmi Singh are both Kannada film directors and producers. Actor Auditya is his grandson and actress Rishika Singh is his granddaughter.

== Filmography ==
Year	Film	Credited as			Notes
Year	Film	Director	Story	Producer	Notes
1947	Krishnaleela	✗	✗	✓	Debut feature
1948	Bhakta Ramadas	✗	✗	✓	
1949	Nagakannika	✗	✗	✓	
1951	Jaganmohini	✓	✓	✓	Released in Kannada and Tamil
1952	Sri Srinivasa Kalyana	✓	✓	✓	
1953	Dallali	✓	✓	✓	
1953	Chanchala Kumari	✓	✓	✓	
1953	Sowbhagya Lakshmi	✗	✗	✓	
1953	Sri Krishna	✗	✗	✓	
1954	Muttidella Chinna	✓	✓	✓	
1954	Maadiddunno Maharaaya	✓	✓	✓	
1955	Gandharva Kanya	✓	✓	✓	
1955	Aashadaboothi	✓	✓	✓	
1955	Shivasharane Nambiyakka	✓	✓	✓	
1956	Daiva Sankalpa	✓	✓	✓	
1957	Prabhulinga Leele	✗	✗	✓	
1958	Mangala Suthra	✓	✓	✓	
1960	Shivalinga Sakshi	✓	✓	✓	
1961	Raja Satyavrata	✓	✓	✓	
1961	Bhakta Chetha	✗	✗	✓	
1962	Sri Dharmasthala Mahathme	✓	✓	✓	
1970	Bhale Khiladi	✗	✓	✓	
1971	Onde Kula Onde Daiva	✓	✓	✓	
1973	Jwala Mohini	✗	✓	✓	
1973	Bangarada Kalla	✓	✓	✓	
1975	Nagakanye	✗	✓	✗	
