= Krishnaleela (1947 film) =

- Directed by: C. V. Raju
- Starring: Kemparaj Urs; Mari Rai; Bellary Lalitha; Bellary Rathnamala
- Music by: P. Kalinga Rao
- Release date: 1947
- Country: India
- Language: Kannada

Krishnaleela is a 1947 Indian Kannada-language Hindu mythological film, directed by C. V. Raju. The film stars Kemparaj Urs, Mari Rai, Bellary Lalitha and Bellary Rathnamala in the lead roles. It features a musical score by P. Kalinga Rao.

== Cast ==
- Kemparaj Urs as Kamsa
- Mari Rai as Krishna
- Bellary Lalitha
- Bellary Rathnamala
- Nagarathna
- Kaantha as Radha
- Prathima Devi as Gopi
