= Subhadra (film) =

- Directed by: P. Pullaiah
- Written by: B. Puttaswamayya
- Screenplay by: B. Puttaswamayya
- Produced by: Gubbi Veeranna; Aacharya
- Starring: Gubbi Veeranna; Honnappa Bhagavathar
- Music by: H. R. Padmanabha Sastry; Mallikarjun Mansur; Narahari Sastri
- Production companies: Balaji and Gubbi Films
- Release date: 1941
- Country: India
- Language: Kannada

Subhadra is a 1941 Indian Kannada film directed by P. Pullaiah based on a work of B. Puttaswamayya, who also wrote the film's screenplay. The film stars Gubbi Veeranna and Honnappa Bhagavathar in the lead roles. Musician B. Devendrappa, B. Raghavendra Rao, Vasudeva Girimaji, B. Jayamma, G. V. Malathamma and Gangubhai Gulegudda feature in supporting roles. Music for the film was composed by Padmanabha Shastry, Mallikarjun Mansur and Narahari Sastri.

== Cast ==
- Gubbi Veeranna
- Honnappa Bhagavathar
- B. Devendrappa
- H. Ramachandra Shastry
- B. Raghavendra Rao
- Vasudeva Girimaji
- B. Jayamma
- G. V. Malathamma
- Gangubhai Gulegudda
