= B. Sohanlal =

Indian film choreographer

B. Sohanlal also credited as Master Sohanlal and Sohanlal was a dance director and choreographer for Hindi films, in the 1950s-1970s, including Madhumati (1958), Guide (1965), Mera Saaya (1966) and Jewel Thief (1967). Born in Jaipur, and a dancer from Jaipur gharana of classical dance Kathak, he started his career as a background dancer in films. He along with his brothers known as the Lal Brothers, B. Hiralal, B Chinnilal and B. Radheshyam, all worked as film choreographers. He was the primary teacher to Bollywood choreographer, Saroj Khan. He married the 13-year old Saroj Khan (then Nirmala Nagpal) while he was 43 yrs old at that time with 4 children of his own from his first marriage. His marriage to 13 year old Saroj khan lasted for 4 years and had 3 children with her in 4 years, Raju Khan and Cuckoo Khan (one died as an infant).
