= Gubbi Veeranna =

Indian theatre personality, filmmaker

- Born: 24 January 1891; Gubbi, Kingdom of Mysore, (present day in Tumkur District, Karnataka), India
- Died: 18 October 1972 (aged 81); Bangalore (St. Martha's Hospital)
- Occupations: Theatre director, actor
- Spouse(s): Sundaramma, Bhadramma, B. Jayamma
- Children: 11

Gubbi Hampanna Veeranna (1891 – 1972) was an Indian theatre director. He was one of the pioneers of and most prolific contributors to Kannada theatre. He established the drama company, Gubbi Sree Channabasaveshwara Nataka Company, which played a crucial role in promoting the Kannada theatre field. He has been conferred the title Nataka Ratna meaning "A Precious Jewel" in the theatre world. Gubbi Veeranna laid the foundation for the Kannada film industry. He established a studio, produced silent films in the early days of cinema and produced good Kannada short films. He built theaters and introduced many actors including Dr Rajkumar, G.V Iyer, B.V Karanth, Girish Karnad and others to the Kannada film industry.

Gubbi Veeranna Nataka Company became the first theatre company in Karnataka to employ female artists to portray female characters on the stage. Elephants and horses were also brought on stage in war scenes of Kurukshetra. There is a popular saying that the story of Gubbi Veeranna's company is itself the story of the Kannada theatre, which indicates the popularity of this company in the theatre world. Apart from theatre, Gubbi Veeranna has also produced films and acted in them as well. He set up one of the first film studio's in Bengaluru called the Sree Kanteerava Studios in association with the government and few other personalities like TS Karibasavaiah and V Shankare Gowda.

In 1955, he was awarded the Sangeet Natak Akademi Award for acting, given by the Sangeet Natak Akademi, India's National Academy of Music, Dance & Drama, and the highest Indian recognition given to practising artists. The Government of India awarded him the fourth-highest civilian honour of the Padma Shri, in 1972, for his contributions to arts.

== Biography ==
Gubbi Veeranna was born in the village Gulaganjihalli, Near Gubbi in the Tumkur district of Karnataka in the year 1891. He started a drama company called Gubbi Shree Channa Basaveshwara Nataka Company and started producing plays in which he also acted sometimes. He had three wives, Sundaramma, Bhadramma and B. Jayamma. He had an unnerving commitment towards the theatre. An incident to corroborate this is when his second wife Sundaramma, who was also an artist with the company, died on the stage while enacting a play. It is said that Gubbi Veeranna who was also acting in the play along with his children, did not stop the play but allowed it to continue till the end. He and his children attended to her dead body only after the play stopped.

Veeranna also is credited for having groomed Rajkumar, Narasimharaju, Balakrishna, G.V.Iyer, B. V. Karanth, Master Hirannaiah and many more artists. He not only helped them with their careers in the theatre field but also provided them with other financial help. As an example, Veeranna provided a financial contribution towards B. V. Karanth's graduation and master's degree at Banaras Hindu University.

Veeranna had many children including G.V Shivanand who was an accomplished dramatist and director. He also had 37 grandchildren including B. Jayashree and Vyjayanthi Kashi, G.S. Sundarashree and G.S. Nataraj. who have been associated with the Kannada theater and film industry.

== Theatre company ==
Initially located in Gubbi, the company started to travel to different places and stage plays in those locations. The company had a troupe of more than 150 artists and backstage workers. Some popular plays staged by the company included Sadaarame and Yechamma Nayaka. These plays consisted of innovations like trick scenes, floods, clouds and rain. In those days, dramas used were staged for free with people only paying according to their liking at the end of the drama.

However, Gubbi Veeranna's dramas were an exception with people willing to buy tickets to watch them. Most of the actors and actresses that entered the Kannada cinema world in those days were from this drama company. Later the company opened branches in different places. An important branch of the company was the Mysore branch which staged popular plays and the finances generated from this branch actually sustained the whole company. The humorist Hirannaiah was one of the persons responsible for the popularity of the Mysore branch.

Gubbi Veeranna's company first came to Bangalore in the year 1916. Later Gubbi Veeranna constructed his own theatre in Bangalore on the Subedar Chatram Road in 1924 and the Shivananda Theatre (now called as Movieland) in 1930. Probably, the most famous artist to emerge from the Gubbi Veeranna company was Rajkumar. Rajkumar's father Singanallur Puttaswamiah was an actor in the company and Rajkumar and his brother joined the company as child artistes. Rajkumar actually attributed his command over the Kannada language and his singing skills to the training he underwent under the watchful eyes of Gubbi Veeranna.

== Film production ==
One of the early pioneers of Kannada cinema, Gubbi Veeranna started a limited company called Karnataka Films Productions to produce films. His first production was a movie 'Song of Life' in 1930, followed by 'His Love Affair' in 1931. He then produced 'Harimaya' in 1932 followed by the evergreen comedy Sadarame in 1935, in which he acted in the lead role. The film had C.I.D. Sakunthala, Ashwathama and B. Jayamma in the cast and was directed by Raja Chandrasekar. He then produced Subhadra which had Honnappa Bhagavathar in the lead.

In 1942, he produced Jeevana Nataka with Kemraj Urs in the lead. He again acted in the lead role in the film Hemareddy Mallamma, in 1945. He produced Sathya Shodhanai in 1953, which was a Tamil Film and had again starred Honnappa Bhagavathar. Karnataka Gubbi Productions was later called as The Karnataka Films Ltd., it is attributed to have started the film career of Rajkumar when it agreed to offer him the lead role in his first film Bedara Kannappa.

He also produced silent movies like His Love Affair which was directed by a foreigner, Raphel Algoet. In this film, the lead role of the actor was played by Gubbi Veeranna himself and the female lead by his wife, Jayamma. In 1956, he produced Sadaarme, which had T. N. Balakrishna in lead and also had Kalyan Kumar. It was the remake of the 1936 movie of the same name. In 1959, he produced Sahodhari, a Tamil film with K. Balaji in the lead role.

== Filmography ==
Film	Year	Director
Song of Life	1930	G. P. Pawar
His Love Affair	1931	Raphaël Algoet
Hari Maya	1932	Y. V. Rao
Sadarame	1936	Raja Chandrasekhar
Subhadra	1941	P. Pullaiah
Jeevana Nataka	1942	Wahab Kashmiri
Hemareddy Mallamma	1945	S. Soundararajan
Gunasagari	1953	H. L. N. Simha

== Recognition ==
The Karnataka government has instituted the Gubbi Veeranna award for excellence in theatre in his memory.
